= 2017 Castleford Tigers season =

English rugby league season

Castleford Tigers 2017 season
- Super League XXII Rank: 1st
- Play-off result: Runners-up
- Challenge Cup: Quarter-finals
- 2017 record: Wins: 26; draws: 0; losses: 6
- Points scored: For: 1,042; against: 578

Team information
- Chairman: Ian Fulton
- Head Coach: Daryl Powell
- Captain: Michael Shenton
- Stadium: The Jungle (Wheldon Road)
- Avg. attendance: 8,933
- Agg. attendance: 142,920
- High attendance: 11,500
- Low attendance: 6,849

Top scorers
- Tries: Greg Eden (41)
- Goals: Luke Gale (145)
- Points: Luke Gale (355)
Home colours	Away colours
← 2016	List of seasons	2018 →

The 2017 season was the Castleford Tigers' 92nd season in the Rugby Football League and their 10th consecutive season in the top flight of English rugby league. The club competed in the 2017 Super League and the 2017 Challenge Cup.

== First-team squad ==
2017 Castleford Tigers squad
First team squad			Coaching staff
(England) 1 Zak Hardaker – FB; (England) 2 Greg Minikin – WG, CE; (New Zealand) 3 Jake Webster – CE; (England) 4 Michael Shenton (c) – CE; (England) 5 Greg Eden – WG, FB; (England) 6 Rangi Chase – SO; (England) 7 Luke Gale (vc) – SH; (England) 8 Andy Lynch – PR; (England) 9 Paul McShane – HK, SO; (Australia) 10 Grant Millington – PR, SR; (England) 11 Oliver Holmes – SR; (England) 12 Mike McMeeken – SR; (England) 13 Adam Milner – LF, HK	(England) 14 Nathan Massey – LF, PR; (Samoa) 15 Jesse Sene-Lefao – SR, PR; (Samoa) 16 Ben Roberts – SO, FB; (Samoa) 17 Junior Moors – SR, PR, LF; (England) 18 Matt Cook – PR; (France) 19 Gadwin Springer – PR; (Wales) 20 Larne Patrick – PR; (Australia) 21 Joel Monaghan – WG, CE; (England) 22 Will Maher – PR; (England) 23 Tom Holmes – SH, HK; (England) 24 Brandon Douglas – PR; (Australia) 25 Jy Hitchcox – WG, FB; (England) 26 Kieran Gill – CE, WG	(Nigeria) 27 Tuoyo Egodo – CE, WG; (England) 28 Conor Fitzsimmons – SR, LF; (England) 29 Luke Million – HK; (England) 30 Declan Sheehan – WG; (England) 31 Brandon Westerman – SR; (England) 32 Daniel Igbinedion – PR; (France) 33 Kevin Larroyer – SR; (England) 34 Alex Foster – SR, LF; (England) 35 Jake Trueman – SO	Head coach: (England) Daryl Powell; Assistant coaches: (England) Danny Orr; (Ireland) Ryan Sheridan; Legend: (c) Captain(s); (vc) Vice-captain(s)

== Transfers and loans ==
=== Gains ===
No	Player	From	Contract	Date
5	(England) Greg Eden	Brisbane Broncos	2 years	13 June 2016
27	(Nigeria) Tuoyo Egodo	London Broncos	2 years	17 October 2016
32	(England) Daniel Igbinedion	Oxford Rugby League	2 years	18 October 2016
15	(Samoa) Jesse Sene-Lefao	Cronulla-Sutherland Sharks	2 years	20 October 2016
35	(England) Jake Trueman	Bradford Bulls	2 years	25 January 2017
33	(France) Kevin Larroyer	Hull Kingston Rovers	1 year (Note: With an option for a further 2 years)	15 February 2017
34	(England) Alex Foster	Bradford Bulls (Note: Released without appearing for Bradford after the Bulls entered administration, having most recently played for the London Broncos)	1 year	16 February 2022
1	(England) Zak Hardaker	Leeds Rhinos	4½ years (Note: Hardaker initially joined on loan from Leeds, with the deal being made permanent during the season)	27 June 2017

=== Loans in ===
No	Player	From	Loan type	Arrival	Return
1	(England) Zak Hardaker	Leeds Rhinos	Season-long	8 November 2016	Permanent (Note: The deal was made permanent on 27 June 2017)

=== Losses ===
No	Player	To	Contract	Date
14	(England) Lee Jewitt	Townsville Blackhawks	1 year	6 April 2016
1	(Australia) Luke Dorn	Retired		13 May 2016
20	(Scotland) Frankie Mariano	Featherstone Rovers	1 year	1 September 2016
21	(England) Ryan Boyle	Halifax RLFC	1 year	19 October 2016
5	(Samoa) Denny Solomona	Retired (Note: Solomona controversially retired from rugby league, aged 23 and with 2 years left on his contract, in order to join rugby union side Sale Sharks)		13 December 2016
31	(England) Brandon Westerman	Released	–	22 January 2017
6	(England) Rangi Chase	Widnes Vikings	2 years	7 July 2017

=== Loans out ===
No	Player	To	Loan type	Departure	Return
26	(England) Kieran Gill	Oldham RLFC	Season-long, recall	31 August 2016	2 May 2017
22	(England) Will Maher	Batley Bulldogs	Season-long, recall	13 October 2016	20 September 2017
23	(England) Tom Holmes	Batley Bulldogs	Season-long, recall	13 October 2016	2 May 2017
28	(England) Conor Fitzsimmons	Workington Town	Season-long	31 October 2016	20 September 2017
19	(England) Ben Crooks	Leigh Centurions	Season-long	7 November 2016	Permanent (Note: The deal was made permanent on 4 October 2017)
25	(Australia) Jy Hitchcox	Batley Bulldogs	Season-long, recall	11 November 2016	2 June 2017
27	(Nigeria) Tuoyo Egodo	Oldham RLFC	Season-long, recall	24 January 2017	16 June 2017
33	(France) Kevin Larroyer	Bradford Bulls	Season-long, recall	15 February 2017	2 May 2017
24	(England) Brandon Douglas	Dewsbury Rams	Season-long, recall	15 March 2017	13 May 2017
6	(England) Rangi Chase	Widnes Vikings	Season-long	15 May 2017	Permanent (Note: The deal was made permanent on 7 July 2017)
24	(England) Brandon Douglas	Halifax RLFC	Season-long, recall	19 May 2017	16 September 2017
27	(Nigeria) Tuoyo Egodo	York City Knights	Season-long, recall	23 June 2017	20 September 2017

=== Dual registration ===
Castleford also agreed dual registration partnerships with the Batley Bulldogs in the RFL Championship and Oxford in League 1.

== Pre-season friendlies ==
Date	Opposition	H/A	Venue	Result	Score	Tries	Goals	Drop goals	Source
Mon 26 December	Hull FC	H	Wheldon Road	W	42–10	McMeeken, Hardaker, Minikin (2), Eden (3), Egodo, Million	McShane (2/6), Hardaker (0/1), Turner (1/2)		
Sun 15 January	Wakefield Trinity	A	Belle Vue	L	30–32	Gale, Minikin, McShane, Eden, Million	Gale (4/4), Eden (1/1)		
Fri 27 January	Batley Bulldogs	A	Mount Pleasant	L	12–38	Gill, Sheehan	Sweeting (2/2)		
Sun 29 January	St Helens	A	Totally Wicked Stadium	W	22–6	Chase, Hardaker, Sene-Lefao, Millington	Gale (3/4)		

== Super League ==
=== Regular season ===
==== Results ====
Date	Round	Opposition	H/A	Venue	Result	Score	Tries	Goals	Drop goals	Attendance	Source
Fri 10 February	1	Leigh Centurions	H	Wheldon Road	W	44–16	Gale (2), Sene-Lefao, Minikin (2), Moors, Eden	Gale (8)		8,522	
Fri 24 February	2	Warrington Wolves	A	Halliwell Jones Stadium	W	30–22	Sene-Lefao, Hardaker, Eden (2), Gale, Minikin	Gale (3)		11,374	
Thu 2 March	3	Leeds Rhinos	H	Wheldon Road	W	66–10	Eden (3), Minikin (3), McMeeken, Hardaker, McShane, Webster, Gale, Shenton	Gale (9)		11,500	
Sun 12 March	4	Widnes Vikings	A	Halton Stadium	W	34–0	Minikin (2), Shenton, Eden (2), Cook	Gale (5)		6,396	
Sun 19 March	5	Salford Red Devils	A	AJ Bell Stadium	L	12–13	Gale, Minikin	Gale (2)		5,221	
Sun 26 March	6	Catalans Dragons	H	Wheldon Road	W	43–26	Hardaker, Millington, Monaghan, Eden (2), Moors, Shenton	Gale (7)	Gale	8,126	
Fri 31 March	7	Huddersfield Giants	H	Wheldon Road	W	52–16	Roberts, Webster, McMeeken, Gale (3), Milner, Monaghan (3)	Gale (6)		8,035	
Thu 6 April	8	Wigan Warriors	A	DW Stadium	W	27–10	Webster, Gale, Sene-Lefao, Eden	Gale (5)	Gale	12,423	
Fri 14 April	9	Wakefield Trinity	H	Wheldon Road	W	42–24	Roberts, Webster (2), O Holmes, Millington (2), Eden	Gale (7)		10,349	
Mon 17 April	10	St Helens	A	Totally Wicked Stadium	L	22–26	Eden (2), Roberts (2)	Gale (3)		6,171	
Sun 23 April	11	Hull FC	A	KCOM Stadium	L	24–26	Minikin, Roberts (2), Shenton, McMeeken	McShane (2)		12,801	
Sat 29 April	12	Wigan Warriors	H	Wheldon Road	W	54–4	Milner, Shenton, Cook, McMeeken, Minikin (2), Gale, Millington, Webster	Gale (8), McShane		9,333	
Thu 4 May	13	Huddersfield Giants	A	Kirklees Stadium	W	26–21	Monaghan, Minikin, Eden, Sene-Lefao	McShane (5)		5,566	
Sun 21 May	14	Leeds Rhinos	N	St James' Park	W	29–18	Gale, Eden (3), T Holmes	Gale (4)	Gale	30,046	
Fri 26 May	15	Widnes Vikings	H	Wheldon Road	W	32–22	Eden (3), Springer, Minikin, Cook	Gale (4)		7,648	
Mon 29 May	16	Leigh Centurions	A	Leigh Sports Village	W	38–0	Sene-Lefao (2), Eden (4), Webster	Gale (5)		5,905	
Sun 4 June	17	St Helens	H	Wheldon Road	W	16–12	Gill, McMeeken, T Holmes	McShane (2)		8,515	
Sun 11 June	18	Warrington Wolves	H	Wheldon Road	W	36–16	Eden (5), Minikin, McMeeken	Gale (4)		8,577	
Fri 23 June	19	Leeds Rhinos	A	Headingley Stadium	W	23–12	Eden, Hardaker, Millington	Gale (5)	Gale	18,029	
Fri 30 June	20	Hull FC	H	Wheldon Road	W	24–22	Gale, McMeeken, Hardaker	Gale (6)		8,371	
Thu 6 July	21	Wakefield Trinity	A	Belle Vue	W	25–24	Eden, Millington, McMeeken, Webster	Gale (4)	Gale	6,430	
Fri 14 July	22	Salford Red Devils	H	Wheldon Road	W	38–14	Eden (2), Roberts, Monaghan (2), Hardaker	Gale (7)		7,094	
Sat 22 July	23	Catalans Dragons	A	Stade Gilbert Brutus	W	32–24	Hitchcox (2), Hardaker, Minikin, McShane	Gale (5), Hardaker		8,657	

==== League table ====
Pos	Team	Pld	W	D	L	PF	PA	PD	Pts	Qualification
1	Castleford Tigers	23	20	0	3	769	378	+391	40	Super League Super 8s
2	Leeds Rhinos	23	15	0	8	553	477	+76	30	Super League Super 8s
3	Hull F.C.	23	13	1	9	541	483	+58	27	Super League Super 8s
4	Salford Red Devils	23	13	0	10	576	500	+76	26	Super League Super 8s
5	Wakefield Trinity	23	13	0	10	572	509	+63	26	Super League Super 8s
6	St. Helens	23	12	1	10	516	420	+96	25	Super League Super 8s
7	Wigan Warriors	23	10	3	10	539	518	+21	23	Super League Super 8s
8	Huddersfield Giants	23	9	3	11	519	486	+33	21	Super League Super 8s
9	Warrington Wolves	23	9	2	12	426	557	−131	20	The Qualifiers
10	Catalans Dragons	23	7	1	15	469	689	−220	15	The Qualifiers
11	Leigh Centurions	23	6	0	17	425	615	−190	12	The Qualifiers
12	Widnes Vikings	23	5	1	17	359	632	−273	11	The Qualifiers

Source: Rugby League Project
Rules for classification: 1) Points; 2) Points difference; 3) Number of points scored;

=== Super 8s ===
==== Results ====
Date	Round	Opposition	H/A	Venue	Result	Score	Tries	Goals	Drop goals	Attendance	Source
Thu 3 August	1	St Helens	H	Wheldon Road	L	12–26	Milner, Monaghan	Gale (2)		6,849	
Fri 11 August	2	Salford Red Devils	A	AJ Bell Stadium	W	23–4	Hardaker (2), McShane, Hitchcox	Gale (3)	Gale	2,811	
Thu 17 August	3	Wakefield Trinity	H	Wheldon Road	W	45–20	Hardaker (2), McMeeken, Webster (4), Eden	Gale (6)	Gale	11,235	
Fri 1 September	4	Huddersfield Giants	A	Kirklees Stadium	W	24–16	Webster, Roberts, Eden, Gale	Gale (4)		6,284	
Fri 8 September	5	Leeds Rhinos	H	Wheldon Road	W	38–24	Eden, Roberts (2), Webster, Foster, Minikin	Gale (7)		9,557	
Sun 17 September	6	Wigan Warriors	A	DW Stadium	W	38–20	Eden, Trueman (3), Minikin (2), Shenton	McShane (5)		15,706	
Fri 22 September	7	Hull FC	H	Wheldon Road	L	16–48	Egodo (3)	McShane (2)		7,974	

==== League table ====
Pos	Team	Pld	W	D	L	PF	PA	PD	Pts	Qualification
1	Castleford Tigers (L)	30	25	0	5	965	536	+429	50	Semi-finals
2	Leeds Rhinos (C)	30	20	0	10	749	623	+126	40	Semi-finals
3	Hull F.C.	30	17	1	12	714	655	+59	35	Semi-finals
4	St Helens	30	16	1	13	663	518	+145	33	Semi-finals
5	Wakefield Trinity	30	16	0	14	714	679	+35	32	
6	Wigan Warriors	30	14	3	13	691	668	+23	31	
7	Salford Red Devils	30	14	0	16	680	728	−48	28	
8	Huddersfield Giants	30	11	3	16	663	680	−17	25	

(C) Champions; (L) League Leaders Shield

=== Play-offs ===
Date	Round	Opposition	H/A	Venue	Result	Score	Tries	Goals	Drop goals	Attendance	Source
Thu 28 September	Semi-final	St Helens	H	Wheldon Road	W	23–22 (GP)	Hardaker, Gale, Milner	Gale (5)	Gale	11,235	
Sat 7 October	Grand Final	Leeds Rhinos	N	Old Trafford	L	6–24	Foster	Gale		72,827	

== Challenge Cup ==
=== Results ===
Date	Round	Opposition	H/A	Venue	Result	Score	Tries	Goals	Drop goals	Attendance	Source
Sat 13 May	6	St Helens	H	Wheldon Road	W	53–10	Shenton, Webster (2), McShane, Minikin (2), Massey, Eden (3)	Gale (6)	Gale	5,216	
Sun 18 June	QF	Hull FC	A	KCOM Stadium	L	24–32	Roberts (2), Hardaker, Minikin	Gale (4)		11,944	

== Player statistics ==
=== Summary ===
No	Player	App	T	G	DG	Pts
1	(England) Zak Hardaker	30	13	1	0	54
2	(England) Greg Minikin	29	22	0	0	88
3	(New Zealand) Jake Webster	28	16	0	0	64
4	(England) Michael Shenton	29	7	0	0	28
5	(England) Greg Eden	31	41	0	0	164
6	(England) Rangi Chase	8	0	0	0	0
7	(England) Luke Gale	30	14	145	9	355
8	(England) Andy Lynch	21	0	0	0	0
9	(England) Paul McShane	33	4	17	0	50
10	(Australia) Grant Millington	30	6	0	0	24
11	(England) Oliver Holmes	10	1	0	0	4
12	(England) Mike McMeeken	32	9	0	0	36
13	(England) Adam Milner	29	4	0	0	16
14	(England) Nathan Massey	30	1	0	0	4
15	(Samoa) Jesse Sene-Lefao	34	6	0	0	24
16	(Samoa) Ben Roberts	29	12	0	0	48
17	(Samoa) Junior Moors	23	2	0	0	8
18	(England) Matt Cook	23	3	0	0	12
19	(France) Gadwin Springer	21	1	0	0	4
20	(Wales) Larne Patrick	7	0	0	0	0
21	(Australia) Joel Monaghan	16	8	0	0	32
22	(England) Will Maher	2	0	0	0	0
23	(England) Tom Holmes	12	2	0	0	8
24	(England) Brandon Douglas	0	0	0	0	0
25	(Australia) Jy Hitchcox	10	3	0	0	12
26	(England) Kieran Gill	1	1	0	0	4
27	(Nigeria) Tuoyo Egodo	1	3	0	0	12
28	(England) Conor Fitzsimmons	0	0	0	0	0
29	(England) Luke Million	0	0	0	0	0
30	(England) Declan Sheehan	0	0	0	0	0
31	(England) Brandon Westerman	0	0	0	0	0
32	(England) Daniel Igbinedion	0	0	0	0	0
33	(France) Kevin Larroyer	7	0	0	0	0
34	(England) Alex Foster	19	2	0	0	8
35	(England) Jake Trueman	3	3	0	0	12

Source: RLRKC – Castleford Tigers 2017
