= 2016 Castleford Tigers season =

- Super League rank: 5th
- Play-off result: Did not qualify
- Challenge Cup: Quarter-finals
- 2016 record: Wins: 16; draws: 1; losses: 15
- Points scored: For: 874; against: 852

Team information
- Chairman: Ian Fulton
- Head Coach: Daryl Powell
- Captain: Michael Shenton & Luke Gale
- Stadium: Wheldon Road

Top scorers
- Tries: Denny Solomona (42)
- Goals: Luke Gale (120)
- Points: Luke Gale (270)
← 2015	List of seasons	2017 →

The 2016 season was the Castleford Tigers 91st season in the Rugby Football League and their 9th consecutive season in the top flight of English rugby league. The club competed in the 2016 Super League and the 2016 Challenge Cup.

== Results ==
=== Super League ===
==== Super League table ====
Pos	Team	Pld	W	D	L	PF	PA	PD	Pts	Qualification
1	Hull F.C.	23	17	0	6	605	465	+140	34	Super League Super 8s
2	Warrington Wolves	23	16	1	6	675	425	+250	33	Super League Super 8s
3	Wigan Warriors	23	16	0	7	455	440	+15	32	Super League Super 8s
4	St Helens	23	14	0	9	573	536	+37	28	Super League Super 8s
5	Catalans Dragons	23	13	0	10	593	505	+88	26	Super League Super 8s
6	Castleford Tigers	23	10	1	12	617	640	−23	21	Super League Super 8s
7	Widnes Vikings	23	10	0	13	499	474	+25	20	Super League Super 8s
8	Wakefield Trinity Wildcats	23	10	0	13	485	654	−169	20	Super League Super 8s
9	Leeds Rhinos	23	8	0	15	404	576	−172	16	The Qualifiers
10	Salford Red Devils	23	10	0	13	560	569	−9	14 (Note: Salford deducted 6 points for salary cap breaches in 2014 and 2015.)	The Qualifiers
11	Hull Kingston Rovers	23	6	2	15	486	610	−124	14	The Qualifiers
12	Huddersfield Giants	23	6	0	17	511	569	−58	12	The Qualifiers

Source: Rugby League Project
Rules for classification: 1) Points; 2) Points difference; 3) Number of points scored;

==== Super League results ====
W Win D Draw L Loss

Date	Round	Versus	H/A	Venue	Result	Score	Tries	Goals	Attendance	Report
7 February	1	Hull Kingston Rovers	A	Craven Park	D	16–16	Solomona, Webster (2)	Gale (2/3)	11,011	
14 February	2	Wakefield Trinity Wildcats	H	Mend-A-Hose Jungle	W	40–6	Solomona (2), Roberts, Dorn, O.Holmes (2), Milner	Gale (6/7)	9,761	
25 February	3	Hull FC	A	KC Stadium	W	31–24	Hitchcox (2), Solomona (3)	Gale (5/5 + DG)	10,247	
4 March	4	St. Helens	A	Langtree Park	L	22–28	Millington, McMeeken, Milner	Gale (4/4), Crooks (1/1)	11,298	
13 March	5	Salford Red Devils	H	Mend-A-Hose Jungle	L	16–32	Solomona (3)	Gale (2/3)	8,151	
18 March	6	Warrington Wolves	A	Halliwell Jones Stadium	L	12–56	Monaghan, Springer	Gale (2/2)	10,940	
24 March	7	Leeds Rhinos	H	Mend-A-Hose Jungle	W	18–14	Lynch, Webster (2)	Gale (3/3)	11,426	
28 March	8	Catalans Dragons	A	Stade Gilbert Brutus	L	22–41	Minikin (2), Monaghan (2)	Gale (3/4)	10,351	
3 April	9	Huddersfield Giants	H	Mend-A-Hose Jungle	W	38–34	Hitchcox (3), McMeeken (2), Minikin, Webster	Gale (5)	6,631	
10 April	10	Widnes Vikings	A	Select Security Stadium	W	34–24	Solomona (3), Boyle, Gale, McShane	Gale (5)	5,081	
15 April	11	Wigan Warriors	A	DW Stadium	L	12–26	Millington, Solomona	Gale (2)	11,849	
24 April	12	Hull Kingston Rovers	H	Mend-A-Hose Jungle	L	16–58	Hampshire, Hitchcox, Webster	Gale (2)	7,106	
1 May	13	St Helens	H	Mend-A-Hose Jungle	L	20–30	Hitchcox, Monaghan, McMeeken, Solomona	Gale (2)	6,658	
12 May	14	Leeds Rhinos	A	Headingley Stadium	W	52–12	Dorn (3), Solomona (2), Crooks, Millington, Monaghan, Springer	Gale (8)	17,213	
21 May	15	Warrington Wolves	N (Note: Magic Weekend)	St James' Park	W	34–14	Dorn (2), Solomona (2), Millington, McMeeken	Gale (5)	39,331	
26 May	16	Wigan Warriors	H	Mend-A-Hose Jungle	L	26–33	Solomona (2), McShane, Webster	Gale (5)	5,558	
3 June	17	Huddersfield Giants	A	John Smith's Stadium	W	30–22	Solomona (2), Webster (2), Gale	Gale (5)	5,741	
9 June	18	Widnes Vikings	H	Mend-A-Hose Jungle	L	28–38	Flynn (3), Gale, Patrick	Gale (4)	4,968	
19 June	19	Hull FC	H	Mend-A-Hose Jungle	L	22–24	Solomona (2), Dorn, Flynn, Webster	Tickle	10,790	
1 July	20	Salford Red Devils	A	AJ Bell Stadium	L	18–22	Webster (2), Dorn	Gale (3)	2,275	
10 July	21	Catalans Dragons	H	Mend-A-Hose Jungle	W	38–24	Dorn (2), Hampshir (2), O. Holmes, Mariano, McShane	Gale (5)	5,886	
17 July	22	Warrington Wolves	H	Mend-A-Hose Jungle	L	26–42	Solomona (4), Crooks, Mariano	Gale	8,060	
24 July	23	Wakefield Trinity Wildcats	A	Rapid Solicitors Stadium	W	46–20	Minikin (4), Gale, Hampshire, O. Holmes, T. Holmes, Moors, Savelio	Gale (7)	6,855	

=== Super 8s ===
==== Super 8s table ====
Pos	Team	Pld	W	D	L	PF	PA	PD	Pts	Qualification
1	Warrington Wolves (L)	30	21	1	8	852	541	+311	43	Semi-finals
2	Wigan Warriors (C)	30	21	0	9	669	560	+109	42	Semi-finals
3	Hull F.C.	30	20	0	10	749	579	+170	40	Semi-finals
4	St Helens	30	20	0	10	756	641	+115	40	Semi-finals
5	Castleford Tigers	30	15	1	14	830	808	+22	31	
6	Catalans Dragons	30	15	0	15	723	716	+7	30	
7	Widnes Vikings	30	12	0	18	603	643	−40	24	
8	Wakefield Trinity	30	10	0	20	571	902	−331	20	

Source: BBC Sport
(C) Champions; (L) League Leaders' Shield Winners

==== Super 8s results ====
W Win D Draw L Loss

Date	Round	Versus	H/A	Venue	Result	Score	Tries	Goals	Attendance	Report
5 August	1	Hull FC	A	KCOM Stadium	W	30–16	Hampshire (2), Dorn, Gale, Milner, Minikin	Gale (3)		
12 August	2	Wigan Warriors	H	Mend-A-Hose Jungle	W	36–22	Solomona (3), Hampshire, O. Holmes, McShane	Gale (6)		
20 August	3	Warrington Wolves	A	Halliwell Jones Stadium	L	11–14	Solomona	Gale (3 + DG)		
2 September	4	Wakefield Trinity Wildcats	H	Mend-A-Hose Jungle	W	46–22	Solomona (3), Chase, Dorn, McShane, Webster	Gale (6)		
8 September	5	St Helens	A	Langtree Park	L	16–40	Dorn, Hampshire, Maher	Gale (2)		
17 September	6	Catalans Dragons	A	Stade Gilbert Brutus	W	34–28	Crooks (2), Flynn (2), Solomona (2)	Gale (5)		
24 September	7	Widnes Vikings	H	Mend-A-Hose Jungle	W	40–26	Solomona (3), Cook, Crooks, Dorn, McShane	Gale (6)	7,103	

=== Challenge Cup ===
W Win L Loss

Date	Round	Versus	H/A	Venue	Result	Score	Tries	Goals	Attendance	Report
7 May	6	Salford Red Devils	H	Mend-A-Hose Jungle	W	32–18	McMeeken (2), Solomona (2), McShane, Webster	McShane (4/6)	3,317	
25 June	QF	Wigan Warriors	A	DW Stadium	L	12–26	Crooks, Gale	Gale (2/2)	8,010	

== Players ==
=== Squad ===
2016 Castleford Tigers Squad
First team squad			Coaching staff
1 Luke Dorn; 2 Joel Monaghan; 3 Jake Webster; 3 Michael Shenton; 5 Denny Solomona; 6 Ben Roberts; 7 Luke Gale; 8 Andy Lynch; 9 Adam Milner; 10 Grant Millington; 11 Oliver Holmes; 12 Mike McMeeken; 13 Nathan Massey	14 Lee Jewitt; 15 Rangi Chase; 15 Paul McShane; 16 Matt Cook; 17 Junior Moors; 17 Brandon Douglas; 18 Ryan Hampshire; 19 Ben Crooks; 20 Frankie Mariano; 21 Ryan Boyle; 22 Gadwin Springer; 23 Will Maher; 24 Greg Minikin	25 Jy Hitchcox; 27 Tom Holmes; 31 Conor Fitzsimmons; 32 Larne Patrick; 33 Danny Tickle; 34 Paddy Flynn; 36 Andre Savelio	Head coach: Daryl Powell; Legend: (c) Captain(s); (vc) Vice-captain(s); Updated: 24 June 2026; Source(s):

=== 2016 transfers in/out ===
In

Name	Moved From	Contract Length	Date announced
Ben Crooks	Parramatta Eels	3 Years	June 2015
Joel Monaghan	Warrington Wolves	2 Years	October 2015
Greg Minikin	York City Knights	2 Years	October 2015
Ryan Hampshire	Wigan Warriors	1 Year Loan	November 2015
Jy Hitchcox	Featherstone Rovers	1 Year	November 2015

Out

Name	Moved To	Contract Length	Date announced
Liam Finn	Wakefield Trinity Wildcats	2 Years	October 2015
Michael Channing	Featherstone Rovers	2 Years	October 2015
Ashley Gibson	Wakefield Trinity Wildcats	2 Years	October 2015
Jordan Howden	York City Knights	2 Years	November 2015
Justin Carney	Salford Red Devils	1 Year Loan	November 2015
Scott Moore	Wakefield Trinity Wildcats	2 Years	November 2015
Scott Wheeldon	Sheffield Eagles	3 Years	November 2015
Ryan Bailey	Warrington Wolves	1 Year	November 2015
Brandon Moore	Halifax	1 Year	December 2015
