= 2019 Castleford Tigers season =

English rugby league season

Castleford Tigers 2019 season
- Super League rank: 5th
- Play-off result: Elimination semi-final
- Challenge Cup: Sixth round
- 2019 record: Wins: 15; draws: 0; losses: 15
- Points scored: For: 672; against: 620

Team information
- Chairman: Ian Fulton
- Head Coach: Daryl Powell
- Captain: Michael Shenton
- Stadium: The Jungle (Wheldon Road)
- Avg. attendance: 7,253
- Agg. attendance: 101,542
- High attendance: 9,316
- Low attendance: 5,323

Top scorers
- Tries: James Clare (16)
- Goals: Peter Mata'utia (56)
- Points: Peter Mata'utia (125)
← 2018	List of seasons	2020 →

The 2019 season was the Castleford Tigers' 94th season in the Rugby Football League and their 12th consecutive season in the top flight of English rugby league. The club competed in the 2019 Super League and the 2019 Challenge Cup.

== First-team squad ==
2019 Castleford Tigers squad
First team squad			Coaching staff
(Samoa) 1 Peter Mata'utia – FB, SO, CE; (England) 2 James Clare – WG; (England) 3 Greg Minikin – CE, WG; (England) 4 Michael Shenton (c) – CE; (England) 5 Greg Eden – WG, FB; (England) 6 Jake Trueman – SO; (England) 7 Luke Gale – SH; (England) 8 Liam Watts – PR; (England) 9 Paul McShane – HK, SO; (Australia) 10 Grant Millington – PR, SR; (England) 11 Oliver Holmes – SR; (England) 12 Mike McMeeken – SR; (England) 13 Adam Milner – LF, HK	(England) 14 Nathan Massey – LF, PR; (Samoa) 15 Jesse Sene-Lefao – SR, PR; (Samoa) 16 Junior Moors – SR, PR, LF; (England) 17 Alex Foster – SR, CE, PR; (England) 18 Matt Cook – PR; (Samoa) 19 Ben Roberts – SO, FB; (England) 20 Jamie Ellis – SO, SH; (New Zealand) 21 Mitch Clark – PR; (Scotland) 22 Joe Wardle – SR, CE; (England) 23 Will Maher – PR; (England) 24 Cory Aston – SO, SH; (Nigeria) 25 Tuoyo Egodo – CE, WG; (England) 26 Kieran Gill – CE, WG	(England) 27 Calum Turner – FB; (England) 28 Lewis Peachey – SR; (England) 29 Jacques O'Neill – HK, LF; (England) 30 Robbie Storey – CE; (England) 31 Lewis Carr – WG; (Australia) 32 Jordan Rankin – SH, FB; (England) 33 Chris Clarkson – SR, PR; (England) 34 Daniel Smith – PR, LF; (Australia) 35 Cheyse Blair – CE	Head coach: (England) Daryl Powell; Assistant coaches: (England) Danny Orr; (Ireland) Ryan Sheridan; Legend: (c) Captain(s); (vc) Vice-captain(s)

== Transfers and loans ==
=== Transfers in ===
No	Player	From	Contract	Date	Ref.
1	(Samoa) Peter Mata'utia	Leigh Centurions	3 years (Note: Mata'utia initially joined on loan during the 2018 season, with the deal being made permanent ahead of 2019)	26 July 2018	
33	(England) Chris Clarkson	Hull Kingston Rovers	1 year (Note: Clarkson signed a permanent deal following a successful trial period)	15 February 2019	
34	(England) Daniel Smith	Huddersfield Giants	1½ years	2 April 2019	
35	(Australia) Cheyse Blair	Melbourne Storm	3½ years	12 April 2019	

=== Loans in ===
No	Player	From	Loan type	Arrival	Return	Ref.
32	(Australia) Jordan Rankin	Huddersfield Giants	Season-long	11 January 2019	Permanent (Note: The deal was extended for the 2020 season on 3 October 2019)	

=== Transfers out ===
No	Player	To	Contract	Date	Ref.
3	(New Zealand) Jake Webster	Bradford Bulls	2 years	21 August 2018	
30	(England) Brandon Douglas	Doncaster	1 year	8 October 2018	
19	(France) Gadwin Springer	Toronto Wolfpack	1 year	18 October 2018	
34	(Samoa) Quentin Laulu-Togaga'e	Halifax	1 year	7 November 2018	
19	(Samoa) Ben Roberts	Retired		20 March 2019	
21	(New Zealand) Mitch Clark	Leigh Centurions	½ year (Note: On 6 June 2019, the Wigan Warriors had announced the signing of Clark from the 2020 season onwards. Castleford rejected Wigan's approaches to sign Clark with immediate effect, instead allowing him to move to Leigh.)	18 July 2019	

=== Loans out ===
No	Player	To	Loan type	Departure	Return	Ref.
26	(England) Kieran Gill	Newcastle Thunder	Season-long	16 November 2018	Permanent (Note: The deal was made permanent on 3 September 2019)	
22	(Scotland) Joe Wardle	Huddersfield Giants	Season-long	11 January 2019	Permanent	
27	(England) Calum Turner	Featherstone Rovers	One-month	30 January 2019	13 March 2019	
24	(England) Cory Aston	Newcastle Thunder	One-month	14 March 2019	14 April 2019	
27	(England) Calum Turner	Featherstone Rovers	One-month	7 June 2019	7 July 2019	

=== Dual registration ===
Castleford also agreed a dual registration arrangement with Halifax R.L.F.C. in the Championship.

Club	No	Player	App	T	G	DG	Pts
Halifax	21	(New Zealand) Mitch Clark	1	0	0	0	0
Halifax	23	(England) Will Maher	2	0	0	0	0
Halifax	29	(England) Jacques O'Neill	1	0	0	0	0

Source: RLRKC – Halifax 2019

== Pre-season friendlies ==
Date	Opposition	H/A	Venue	Result	Score	Tries	Goals	Drop goals	Source
Sun 30 December	Featherstone Rovers	H	Wheldon Road	W	56–0	Gill (3), Clare (2), Carr (3), Minikin, Sweeting, Turner	Aston (6)		
Sun 20 January (Note: Kallum Watkins' testimonial match)	Leeds Rhinos	A	Headingley Stadium	W	26–24	Shenton, Clare (2), Moors, Foster, McShane	Rankin		

== Super League ==
=== Regular season ===
==== Results ====
Date	Round	Opposition	H/A	Venue	Result	Score	Tries	Goals	Drop goals	Attendance
Fri 1 February	1	Catalans Dragons	H	Wheldon Road	W	20–4	McShane, Eden (2)	McShane (4)		7,494
Thu 7 February	2	Hull FC	A	KCOM Stadium	W	26–18	Shenton (2), Sene-Lefao, Clare, Moors	McShane (2), Rankin		11,244
Sat 23 February	3	London Broncos	A	Trailfinders Sports Ground	W	40–6	Mata'utia, Trueman, Moors, Sene-Lefao, Watts, Eden, Rankin	McShane (5), Rankin		2,053
Fri 1 March	4	Hull Kingston Rovers	H	Wheldon Road	W	32–16	Rankin, Watts, Eden (2), Clare, Clarkson	McShane, Rankin (3)		8,770
Thu 7 March	5	Warrington Wolves	A	Halliwell Jones Stadium	L	10–24	Eden, Minikin	Rankin		9,231
Sun 17 March	6	Salford Red Devils	H	Wheldon Road	W	24–20	Massey, Rankin, Eden, Sene-Lefao	Rankin (4)		7,750
Fri 22 March	7	St Helens	H	Wheldon Road	L	12–42	Shenton, Trueman	Rankin (2)		8,042
Thu 28 March	8	Leeds Rhinos	A	Headingley Stadium	L	20–21 (GP)	Watts, Minikin, Clarkson, Foster	Turner (2)		12,295
Fri 5 April	9	Wigan Warriors	H	Wheldon Road	W	38–28	Holmes, Turner, Clark, Cook, Milner, Egodo, Mata'utia	Mata'utia (5)		6,839
Thu 11 April	10	Huddersfield Giants	A	Kirklees Stadium	L	18–20	Eden, Cook	Mata'utia (5)		4,684
Thu 18 April	11	Wakefield Trinity	H	Wheldon Road	W	28–26	Clare (2), Sene-Lefao, Aston, Minikin	Mata'utia (4)		9,316
Mon 22 April	12	Catalans Dragons	A	Stade Gilbert Brutus	L	16–37	Eden (2), Aston	Mata'utia (2)		10,120
Sat 27 April	13	Wigan Warriors	A	DW Stadium	L	4–6		Mata'utia (2)		10,058
Fri 3 May	14	Warrington Wolves	H	Wheldon Road	L	14–26	Aston, Egodo, Minikin	Mata'utia		5,323
Thu 16 May	15	Leeds Rhinos	A	Headingley Stadium	W	30–8	Sene-Lefao (2), Eden, Clare, Trueman	Mata'utia (5)		13,286
Sun 26 May	16	St Helens	N	Anfield	L	16–36	Millington, Clarkson, Eden	Mata'utia, Rankin		26,812
Fri 7 June	17	Huddersfield Giants	H	Wheldon Road	W	27–26 (GP)	Minikin, Watts, Millington	Mata'utia (7)	Mata'utia	7,483
Thu 13 June	18	Hull FC	H	Wheldon Road	L	18–31	Minikin, Moors, Eden	Mata'utia (3)		6,344
Fri 21 June	19	Salford Red Devils	A	AJ Bell Stadium	L	16–26	Smith, Minikin, Rankin	Mata'utia (2)		2,829
Sun 30 June	20	London Broncos	H	Wheldon Road	W	42–10	Egodo (2), McMeeken (2), Rankin, Trueman, Clare, Clarkson	Rankin (5)		6,860
Fri 5 July	21	Leeds Rhinos	H	Wheldon Road	L	10–18	Clare (2)	Rankin		8,147
Fri 12 July	22	Wakefield Trinity	A	Belle Vue	W	36–16	Egodo, Holmes, Clare (3), Rankin (2)	Mata'utia (4)		6,244
Sun 21 July	23	Warrington Wolves	H	Wheldon Road	W	27–18	Clare, Minikin, Trueman, Egodo	Mata'utia (5)	Trueman	6,965
Sun 4 August	24	Hull Kingston Rovers	A	Craven Park	L	26–27 (GP)	Mata'utia, Rankin, Clare, Minikin	Mata'utia (5)		8,004
Sat 10 August	25	London Broncos	H	Wheldon Road	W	20–6	Egodo (2), Holmes, O'Neill	Ellis (2)		5,497
Sun 18 August	26	Huddersfield Giants	A	Kirklees Stadium	W	24–0	Clare, Milner, McMeeken, Sene-Lefao	Ellis (4)		4,636
Fri 30 August	27	St Helens	A	Totally Wicked Stadium	L	0–4				10,315
Thu 5 September	28	Hull FC	H	Wheldon Road	W	44–12	Blair, Trueman (3), Clare, Rankin, Cook	Ellis (8)		6,712
Thu 12 September	29	Wigan Warriors	A	DW Stadium	L	8–26	Blair	Ellis (2)		11,001

Sources: RLRKC – Castleford Tigers 2019 & Rugby League Project

==== League table ====
Pos	Team	Pld	W	D	L	PF	PA	PD	Pts	Qualification
1	St. Helens (C, L)	29	26	0	3	916	395	+521	52	Semi Final
2	Wigan Warriors	29	18	0	11	699	539	+160	36	Qualifying Final
3	Salford Red Devils	29	17	0	12	783	597	+186	34	Qualifying Final
4	Warrington Wolves	29	16	0	13	709	533	+176	32	Elimination Final
5	Castleford Tigers	29	15	0	14	646	558	+88	30	Elimination Final
6	Hull F.C.	29	15	0	14	645	768	−123	30	
7	Catalans Dragons	29	13	0	16	553	745	−192	26	
8	Leeds Rhinos	29	12	0	17	650	644	+6	24	
9	Wakefield Trinity	29	11	0	18	608	723	−115	22	
10	Huddersfield Giants	29	11	0	18	571	776	−205	22	
11	Hull KR	29	10	0	19	548	768	−220	20	
12	London Broncos (R)	29	10	0	19	505	787	−282	20	Relegated to Championship

(C) Champions; (L) League Leaders' Shield Winners; (R) Relegated

=== Playoffs ===
Date	Round	Opposition	H/A	Venue	Result	Score	Tries	Goals	Drop goals	Attendance	Source
Thu 19 September	Elimination play-off	Warrington Wolves	A	Halliwell Jones Stadium	W	14–12	Milner, Rankin	Mata'utia (3)		5,627	
Thu 26 September	Elimination semi-final	Salford Red Devils	A	AJ Bell Stadium	L	0–22				4,800	

== Challenge Cup ==
=== Results ===
Date	Round	Opposition	H/A	Venue	Result	Score	Tries	Goals	Drop goals	Attendance	Source
Fri 10 May	6	Hull FC	A	KCOM Stadium	L	12–28	Clare, Aston	Mata'utia (2)		6,230	

== Player statistics ==
=== Summary ===
No	Player	App	T	G	DG	Pts
1	(Samoa) Peter Mata'utia	31	3	56	1	125
2	(England) James Clare	30	16	0	0	64
3	(England) Greg Minikin	30	9	0	0	36
4	(England) Michael Shenton	12	3	0	0	12
5	(England) Greg Eden	21	13	0	0	52
6	(England) Jake Trueman	31	8	0	1	33
7	(England) Luke Gale	0	0	0	0	0
8	(England) Liam Watts	30	4	0	0	16
9	(England) Paul McShane	28	1	12	0	28
10	(Australia) Grant Millington	26	2	0	0	8
11	(England) Oliver Holmes	15	3	0	0	12
12	(England) Mike McMeeken	22	3	0	0	12
13	(England) Adam Milner	28	3	0	0	12
14	(England) Nathan Massey	27	1	0	0	4
15	(Samoa) Jesse Sene-Lefao	25	7	0	0	28
16	(Samoa) Junior Moors	13	3	0	0	12
17	(England) Alex Foster	6	1	0	0	4
18	(England) Matt Cook	21	3	0	0	12
19	(Samoa) Ben Roberts	1	0	0	0	0
20	(England) Jamie Ellis	5	0	16	0	32
21	(New Zealand) Mitch Clark	9	1	0	0	4
22	(Scotland) Joe Wardle	0	0	0	0	0
23	(England) Will Maher	9	0	0	0	0
24	(England) Cory Aston	9	4	0	0	16
25	(Nigeria) Tuoyo Egodo	12	8	0	0	32
26	(England) Kieran Gill	0	0	0	0	0
27	(England) Calum Turner	5	1	2	0	8
28	(England) Lewis Peachey	1	0	0	0	0
29	(England) Jacques O'Neill	11	1	0	0	4
30	(England) Robbie Storey	0	0	0	0	0
31	(England) Lewis Carr	0	0	0	0	0
32	(Australia) Jordan Rankin	24	10	19	0	78
33	(England) Chris Clarkson	20	4	0	0	16
34	(England) Daniel Smith	19	1	0	0	4
35	(Australia) Cheyse Blair	18	2	0	0	8

Source: RLRKC – Castleford Tigers 2019
