= Paul McShane =

Paul McShane may refer to:

- Paul McShane (footballer) (born 1986), Irish football player
- Paul McShane (rugby league) (born 1989), rugby league footballer

== See also ==
- Paul Shane (1940–2013), British comic actor
