= Greg Minikin =

English professional rugby league footballer

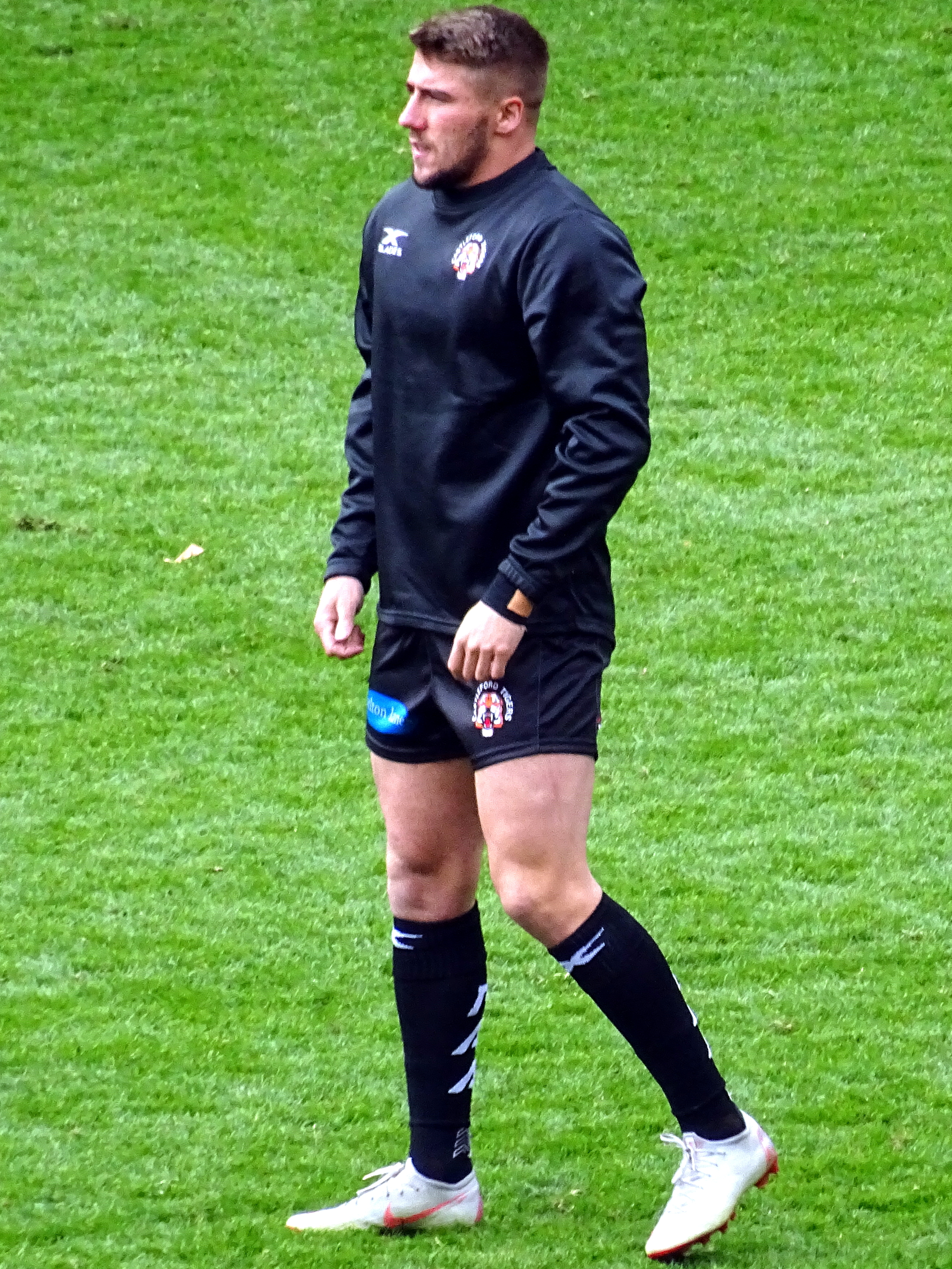

Personal information
- Full name: Gregory Minikin
- Born: 29 March 1995 (age 31) Knaresborough, North Yorkshire, England
- Height: 5 ft 11 in (1.80 m)
- Weight: 13 st 12 lb (88 kg)

Playing information

Rugby league
- Position: Centre, Wing
Club
Years	Team	Pld	T	G	FG	P
2013–15	York City Knights	43	23	0	0	92
2016–19	Castleford Tigers	96	43	0	0	172
2016(loan)	→ Batley Bulldogs	7	4	0	0	16
2020–21	Hull Kingston Rovers	25	10	0	0	40
2022–23	Warrington Wolves	20	2	0	0	8
2024	Featherstone Rovers	27	11	0	0	44
	Total	218	93	0	0	372
Representative
Years	Team	Pld	T	G	FG	P
2019	England Knights	1	3	0	0	12

Rugby union
Club
Years	Team	Pld	T	G	FG	P
2025–	Hull Ionians	0	0	0	0	0
- Source: As of 15 August 2025

Greg Minikin (born 29 March 1995) is an English former professional rugby league footballer who last played as a centre or winger for Featherstone Rovers in the RFL Championship, and now plays rugby union for Hull Ionians in the National League 2 North. He has represented the England Knights at international level.

He has previously played for the York City Knights in the RFL Championship and the Castleford Tigers, Hull Kingston Rovers and Warrington Wolves in the Super League. Minkin also spent time on loan from Castleford at the Batley Bulldogs in the Championship.

== Background ==
Minikin was born in Knaresborough, North Yorkshire, England.

== Career ==
=== York City Knights ===
Minikin made his Knights début on 12 May 2013 in a Challenge Cup match away at Catalans Dragons in the south of France. His league début came on 23 June 2013 in a Championship match against Leigh Centurions at the Leigh Sports Village.

=== Castleford Tigers ===
After an impressive three seasons at York, Minikin was signed by Super League club Castleford Tigers on a two-year contract starting in 2016.

He played in the 2017 Super League Grand Final defeat by the Leeds Rhinos at Old Trafford.

==== Batley Bulldogs (loan) ====
In that same year, Minikin was loaned to Championship side Batley. Here, he scored 4 tries in just 7 appearances.

=== Hull Kingston Rovers ===
In 2020, he joined Hull KR. Minikin made a total of 10 appearances in the 2020 Super League season and scored six tries. He missed most of the season with a knee injury which occurred against Wigan.

=== Warrington Wolves ===
On 6 September 2021, it was reported that he had signed for Warrington in the Super League Minikin played six games for Warrington in the 2022 Super League season which saw the club finish 11th on the table. Minikin played 15 games for Warrington in the 2023 Super League season as Warrington finished sixth on the table and qualified for the playoffs.

=== Featherstone Rovers ===
On 20 October 2023, it was reported that he had signed for Featherstone Rovers for 2024.

He retired from rugby league after a knee operation in 2024.

=== Hull Ionians ===
On 15 August 2025 it was reported that he had signed to play for rugby union National League 2 North side Hull Ionians joining his brother Lewis Minikin.

== International career ==
In July 2018 he was selected in the England Knights Performance squad.

In 2019 he was selected for the England Knights against Jamaica at Headingley Rugby Stadium.

== Club statistics ==
Appearances and points in all competitions by year
Club	Season	Tier	App	T	G	DG	Pts
York City Knights	2013	Championship	4	1	0	0	4
York City Knights	2014	League 1	12	4	0	0	16
York City Knights	2015	League 1	27	18	0	0	72
York City Knights	Total		43	23	0	0	92
Castleford Tigers	2016	Super League	17	6	0	0	24
Castleford Tigers	2017	Super League	29	22	0	0	88
Castleford Tigers	2018	Super League	20	6	0	0	24
Castleford Tigers	2019	Super League	30	9	0	0	36
Castleford Tigers	Total		96	43	0	0	172
→ Batley Bulldogs (DR)	2016	Championship	7	4	0	0	16
Hull Kingston Rovers	2020	Super League	11	6	0	0	24
Hull Kingston Rovers	2021	Super League	14	4	0	0	16
Hull Kingston Rovers	Total		25	10	0	0	40
Warrington Wolves	2022	Super League	6	1	0	0	4
Warrington Wolves	2023	Super League	14	1	0	0	4
Warrington Wolves	Total		20	2	0	0	8
Featherstone Rovers	2024	Championship	27	11	0	0	44
Career total			218	93	0	0	372

As of match played 8 September 2024
