= Mike McMeeken =

England international rugby league footballer

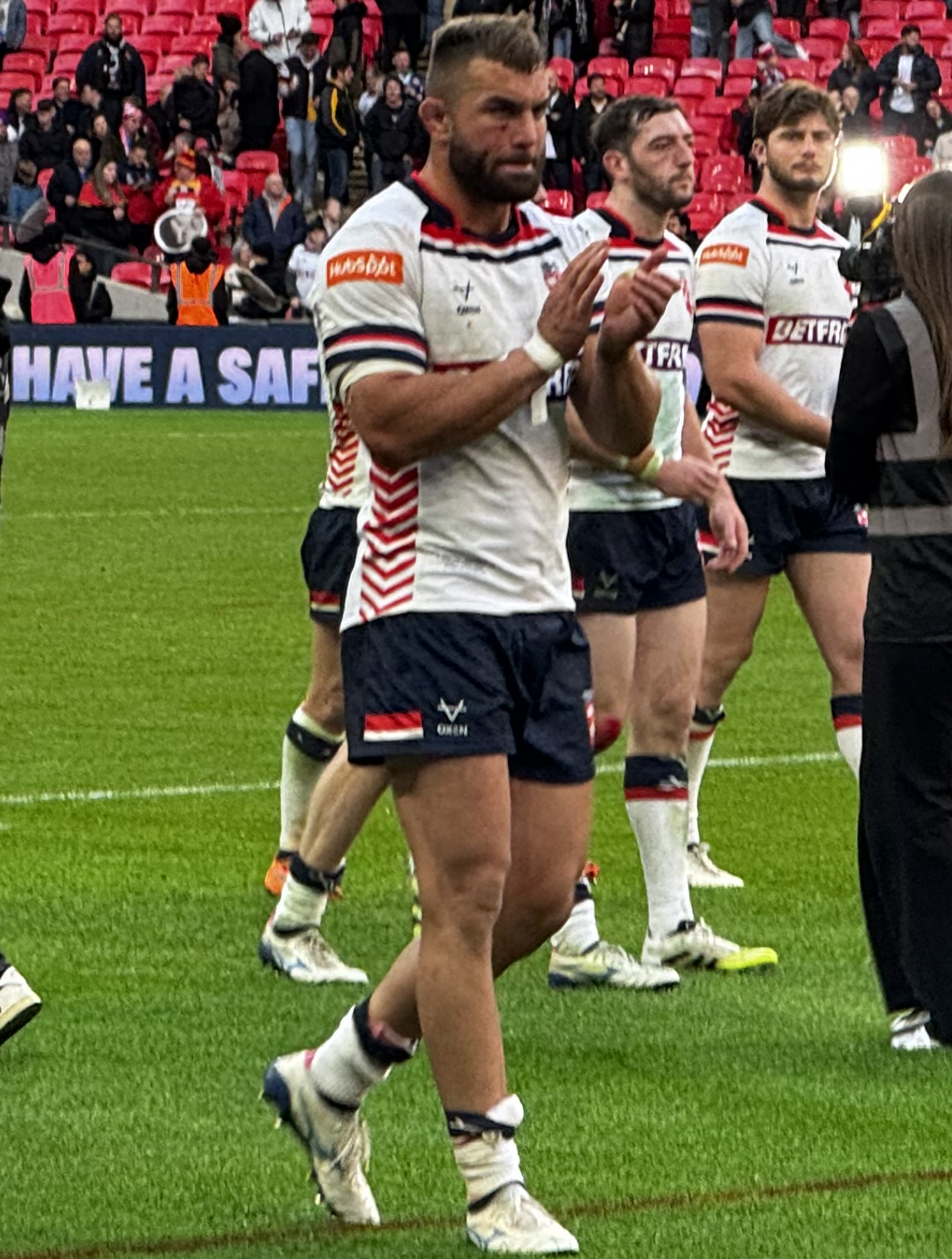

Personal information
- Full name: Michael Joseph McMeeken
- Born: 10 May 1994 (age 32) Basingstoke, Hampshire, England
- Height: 6 ft 5 in (1.95 m)
- Weight: 16 st 12 lb (107 kg)

Playing information
- Position: Second-row, Prop
Club
Years	Team	Pld	T	G	FG	P
2012–14	London Broncos	37	5	0	0	20
2014(DR)	→ London Skolars	3	1	0	0	4
2014(DR)	→ Hemel Stags	2	0	0	0	0
2015–20	Castleford Tigers	139	34	0	0	136
2021–24	Catalans Dragons	81	17	0	0	68
2025–	Wakefield Trinity	39	6	0	0	24
	Total	301	63	0	0	252
Representative
Years	Team	Pld	T	G	FG	P
2017–	England	14	2	0	0	8
- Source: As of 12 November 2026

Michael Joseph McMeeken (born 10 May 1994) is an English professional rugby league footballer who plays as a second-row or prop forward for Wakefield Trinity in the Super League and England at international level.

He has previously played for the London Broncos, Castleford Tigers and the Catalans Dragons in the Super League. He has spent time on dual registration at the London Skolars and the Hemel Stags in League One.

McMeeken has played for England at international level and featured in the 2017 and 2021 Rugby League World Cups.

== Background ==
McMeeken was born in Basingstoke, and raised in Fleet, Hampshire, England.

He initially played rugby union from an early age, but was introduced to rugby league at ten years old, and began playing for amateur side West London Sharks.

== Club career ==
=== London Broncos ===
He started his professional career at London Broncos, making his senior debut in 2012. During the 2014 season, he scored his first try for the club in a defeat against Salford Red Devils. He also spent time at Championship One clubs London Skolars and Hemel Stags on dual-registration.

=== Castleford Tigers ===
Following London's relegation from Super League at the end of the 2014 season, McMeeken joined Castleford Tigers on a two-year deal. He then signed a two-year extension, keeping him at Castleford until 2018.

In 2017, McMeeken signed a further two-year extension until the end of the 2020 season. He played in the 2017 Super League Grand Final defeat by Leeds at Old Trafford.

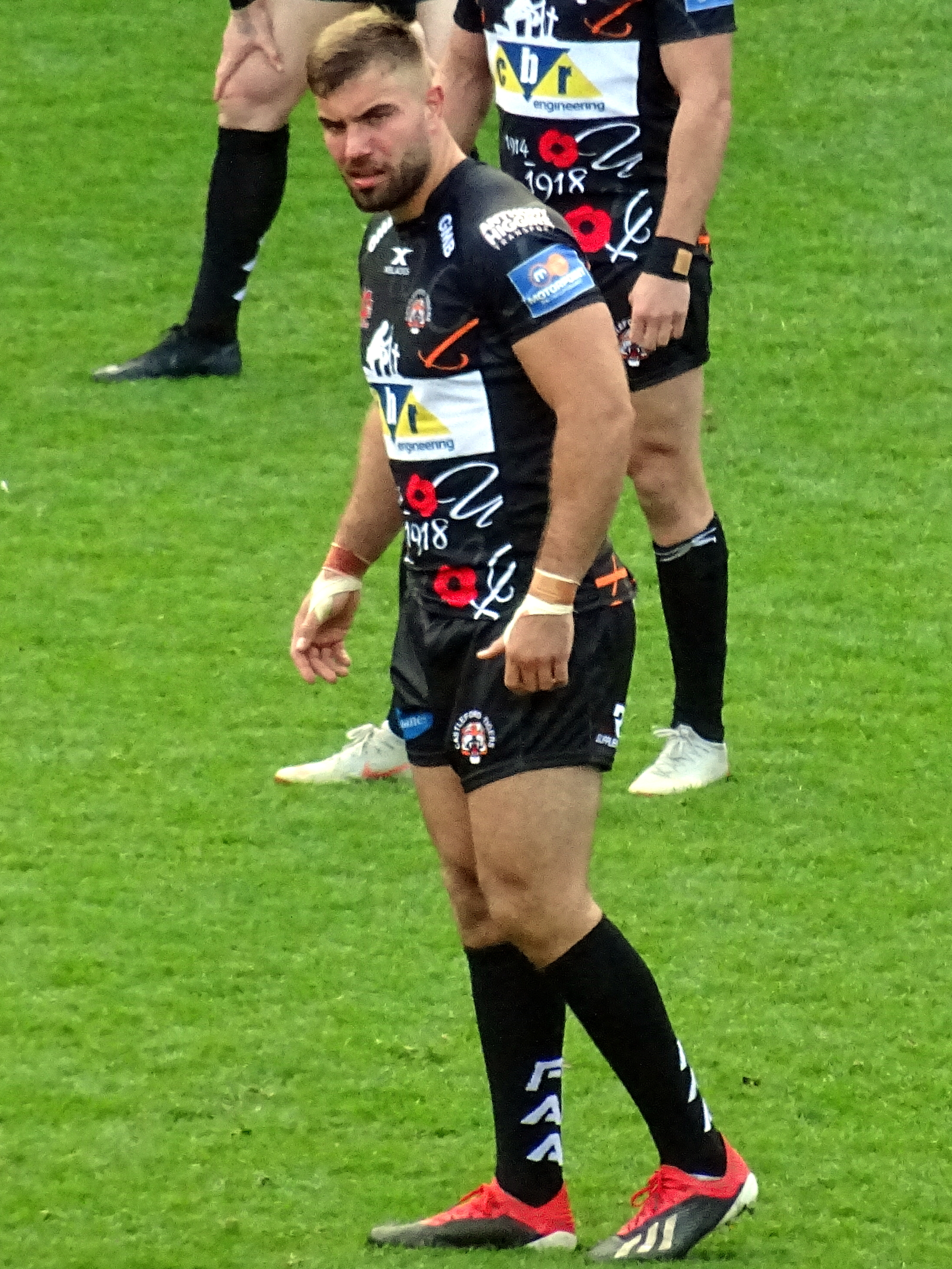
McMeeken warming up for Castleford in 2019

=== Catalans Dragons ===
In December 2020, McMeeken signed a two-year contract with Catalans Dragons. On 9 October 2021, he played for Catalans Dragons in their 2021 Super League Grand Final defeat against St Helens.

In April 2022, McMeeken signed a two-year contract extension with Catalans. On 14 October 2023, McMeeken played in Catalans 2023 Super League Grand Final loss against Wigan.

=== Wakefield Trinity ===
On 3 May 2024, it was reported that he had signed for Wakefield Trinity on a four-year deal. On 3 October 2026, he captained Wakefield Trinity to victory in the Super League Grand Final against Warrington. It was Wakefield's first major trophy in 58 years.

== International career ==
In 2011, McMeeken was selected in the England academy squad.

In February 2017, he was included in the England elite performance squad announced by coach Wayne Bennett. In May 2017, McMeeken made his international début for the England senior team in the 30–10 victory over Samoa in Campbelltown, Australia. He was also selected in the England squad for the 2017 Rugby League World Cup, making one appearance during the tournament in England's 36–6 win against France.

McMeeken was recalled to the England setup in 2022, and was selected for the 2021 Rugby League World Cup. He played in four of England's five games, scoring his first international try against Greece.

In 2024, McMeeken played from the bench in both tests during the two-match home test series against Samoa.

On 13 October 2025, McMeeken was selected in the 24-man England national rugby league team squad for the forthcoming Ashes Test series against Australia national rugby league team.

== Club statistics ==
Appearances and points in all competitions by year
Club	Season	Tier	App	T	G	DG	Pts
London Broncos	2012	Super League	3	0	0	0	0
London Broncos	2013	Super League	13	0	0	0	0
London Broncos	2014	Super League	21	5	0	0	20
London Broncos	Total		37	5	0	0	20
→ London Skolars (DR)	2014	League One	3	1	0	0	4
→ Hemel Stags (DR)	2014	League One	2	0	0	0	0
Castleford Tigers	2015	Super League	20	2	0	0	8
Castleford Tigers	2016	Super League	23	7	0	0	28
Castleford Tigers	2017	Super League	32	9	0	0	36
Castleford Tigers	2018	Super League	26	9	0	0	36
Castleford Tigers	2019	Super League	22	3	0	0	12
Castleford Tigers	2020	Super League	16	4	0	0	16
Castleford Tigers	Total		139	34	0	0	136
Catalans Dragons	2021	Super League	25	11	0	0	44
Catalans Dragons	2022	Super League	14	1	0	0	4
Catalans Dragons	2023	Super League	27	4	0	0	16
Catalans Dragons	2024	Super League	15	1	0	0	4
Catalans Dragons	Total		81	17	0	0	68
Wakefield Trinity	2025	Super League	0	0	0	0	0
Career total			262	57	0	0	228

As of match played 14 September 2024
