= Greg Eden =

English rugby league footballer (born 1990)

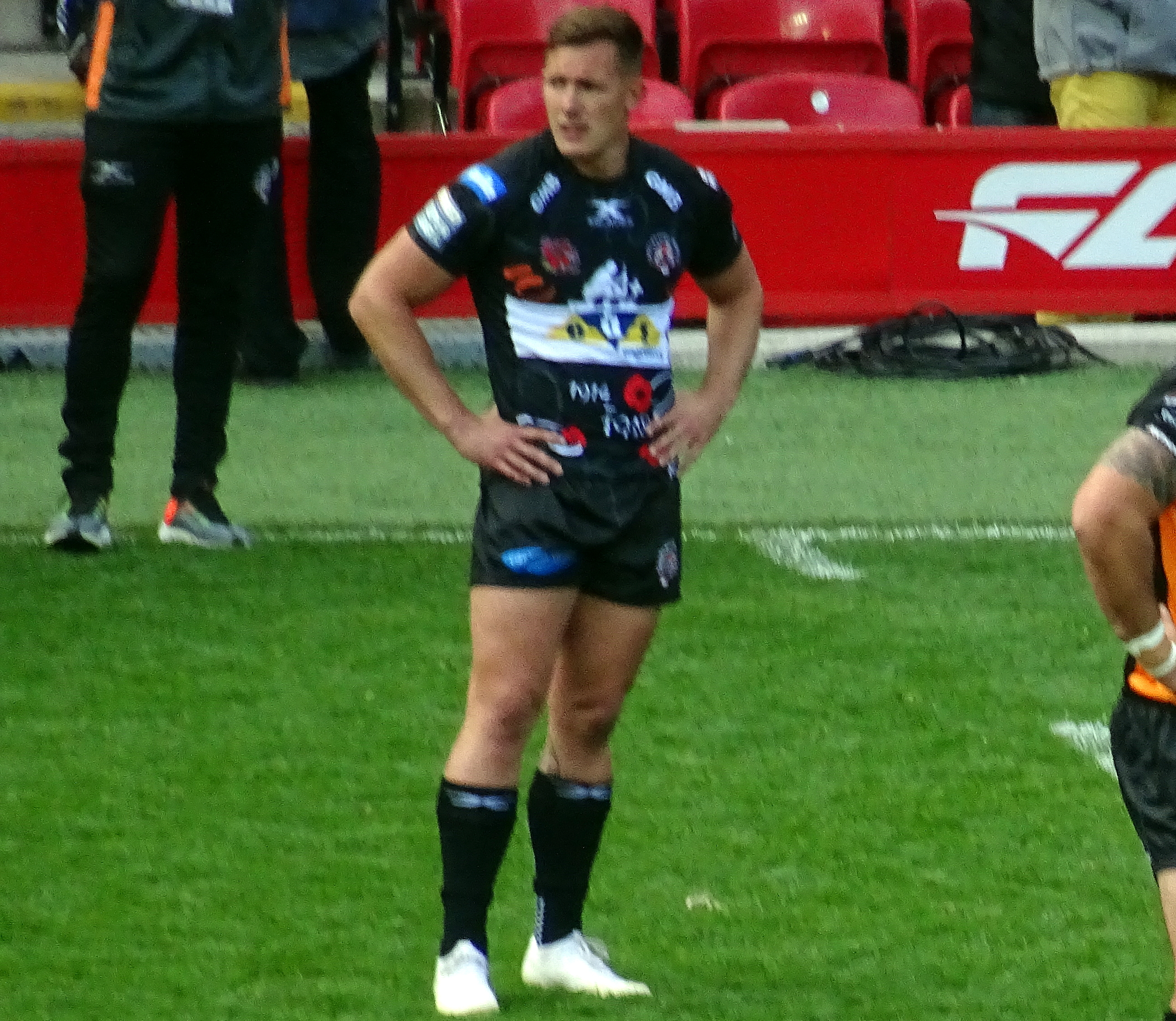

Personal information
- Full name: Gregory Philip Eden
- Born: 14 November 1990 (age 36) Castleford, West Yorkshire, England
- Height: 5 ft 11 in (1.81 m)
- Weight: 14 st 5 lb (91 kg)

Playing information
- Position: Wing, Fullback
Club
Years	Team	Pld	T	G	FG	P
2011	Castleford Tigers	3	1	0	0	4
2012	Huddersfield Giants	27	13	0	0	52
2013–14	Hull Kingston Rovers	39	24	0	0	96
2014(loan)	→ Salford Red Devils	5	1	0	0	4
2014(DR)	→ Gateshead Thunder	2	0	0	0	0
2015–16	Brisbane Broncos	7	2	0	0	8
2017–23	Castleford Tigers	119	111	0	0	444
2024	Halifax Panthers	9	5	0	0	20
2024	Featherstone Rovers	15	1	0	0	4
2025	Hunslet	12	4	0	0	16
2026	North Wales Crusaders	11	10	0	0	40
2026(loan)	→ Bradford Bulls	2	1	0	0	4
2026–	Sheffield Eagles	11	8	0	0	32
	Total	262	181	0	0	724
Representative
Years	Team	Pld	T	G	FG	P
2012	England Knights	1	0	0	0	0
- Source: As of 13 September 2026

Greg Eden (born 14 November 1990) is an English professional rugby league footballer who plays as a winger or fullback for the Sheffield Eagles in the RFL Championship.

Eden has represented the England Knights at international level. He has previously played for Castleford Tigers, Huddersfield Giants and Hull Kingston Rovers in the Super League, for Brisbane Broncos in the NRL, and for Halifax Panthers, Featherstone Rovers, Hunslet and North Wales Crusaders in the RFL Championship. He has spent time on loan and dual registration at Salford Red Devils and Bradford Bulls in the Super League, and at Gateshead Thunder in League 1.

Eden is renowned for his lightning pace and his prolific finishing ability. He ranks as Castleford's second-highest top tryscorer in the Super League era, and eighth-highest of all time.

== Background ==
Eden was born in Castleford, West Yorkshire, England.

== Club career ==
=== Castleford Tigers ===
Eden made his senior debut for Castleford in the Super League against the Warrington Wolves on 1 July 2011, scoring and assisting a try.

=== Huddersfield Giants ===
Eden signed for the Huddersfield Giants from the Castleford Tigers in the winter of 2011 and made an immediate impact in the Super League, establishing himself as first choice fullback at the Huddersfield Giants within weeks of the season beginning. He was rewarded with a long-term deal until the end of the 2015 season.

=== Hull Kingston Rovers ===
Eden moved to Hull Kingston Rovers in the winter of 2012, signing a three-year deal. He made 39 appearances for the club across 2 seasons, scoring 24 tries.

==== Salford Red Devils (loan) ====
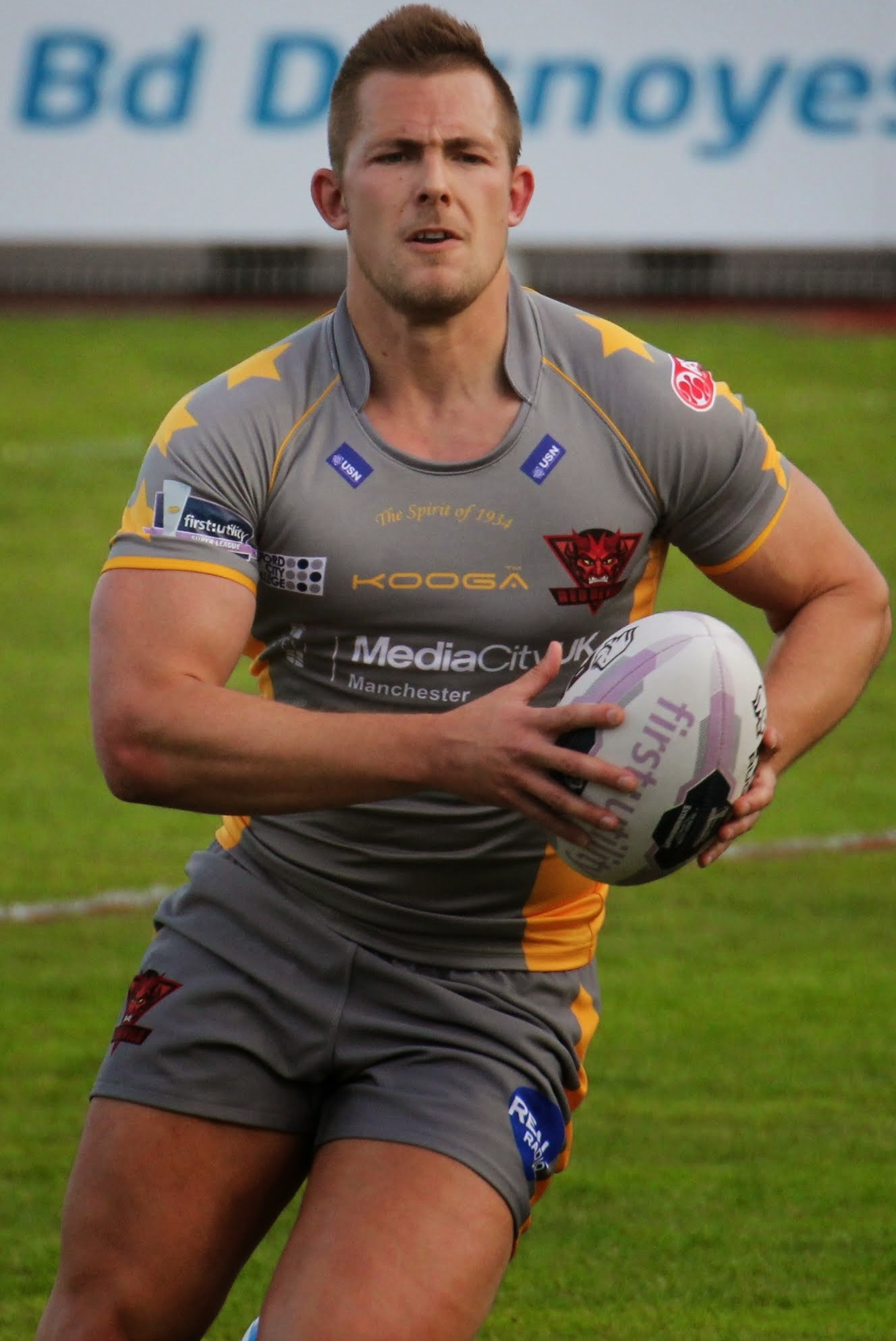
Eden playing for the Salford Red Devils in 2014

On 25 April 2014, Greg Eden joined the Salford Red Devils on a 1-month loan deal. In May, this was subsequently extended on a week-by-week basis, with Hull KR able to recall him at any chosen period. The Robins exercised this right in June following a serious injury to fullback Ben Cockayne.

==== Gateshead Thunder (dual registration) ====
Eden made 2 appearances for Gateshead in 2014, through their dual-registration arrangement with Hull KR.

=== Brisbane Broncos ===
On 1 September 2014, Eden signed with Brisbane Broncos, boosting their Fullback ranks after the Broncos showed great interest in him. Eden spent the 2015 season with the Broncos affiliate club Wynnum Manly Seagulls in the Queensland Cup. In February 2016, Eden made his Broncos debut in the World Club Series against the Wigan Warriors, scoring a try in a 42–12 win.

=== Castleford Tigers ===
In June 2016 Eden agreed upon a two-year contract with hometown Super League side Castleford Tigers for the upcoming season starting in 2017.

Eden was given the squad number 5 prior to the start of the season, and played the majority of matches on Castleford's left wing. He scored 38 Super League tries in his first season back at Castleford, including 5 hat-tricks against Leeds twice, Widnes, Leigh and Warrington. Eden topped the try scoring charts and was named in the Super League Dream Team for this season. He played at fullback in the 2017 Super League Grand Final defeat by the Leeds Rhinos at Old Trafford, after Zak Hardaker was suspended two days before the game following a failed drugs test.

Eden's excellent strike rate for the Tigers was rewarded with a three-year contract extension in 2018. However, his season was limited to just 15 appearances following a hamstring injury. Despite this, he still scored 18 tries, including 3 hat-tricks against Widnes, Catalans and Wakefield.

In the first match of 2020, Eden scored a trademark length-of-the-field try against Toronto Wolfpack, before hyper extending his knee in the second half. He scored a hat-trick against Hull KR and finished the season with 8 tries in 8 appearances.

Eden's impressive performances following his return to the team towards the end of an injury-hit 2021 season contributed towards Castleford's improvement in form. He scored a late length-of-the-field interception try on 12 August 2021 to seal Castleford's first league win away to St Helens in 31 years.

Eden scored a hat-trick against Hull F.C. in his first appearance of the 2022 season. He was also voted the Fans' Man of the Match for his first 2 games of the year. He scored his 100th Castleford try on 14 April against Wakefield Trinity in his 94th game for the club. In the second half of the season, Eden was primarily utilised as a stand-off or fullback due to the concurrent injury absences of Jake Trueman, Gareth O'Brien, Niall Evalds and Ryan Hampshire. In July, he signed a new one-year deal with Cas, with the option of a further year.

In round 22 of the 2023 season, billed as the repeat of the 2006 'Battle of Belle Vue', Eden scored a hat-trick to earn victory for Castleford in their relegation clash against Wakefield Trinity. In doing so, he reached 150 career tries. He scored nine tries in fifteen appearances throughout the season as the Tigers finished 11th, narrowly avoiding relegation.

=== Halifax Panthers ===
On 7 November 2023, it was reported that he had signed for the Halifax Panthers in the RFL Championship on a two-year deal. He made his debut for the club on 28 January 2024 in an 1895 Cup first round fixture away at Oldham R.L.F.C., scoring 2 tries in a 24-20 defeat.

On 15 May 2024, it was announced that he had ended his contract with Halifax with immediate effect after expressing a desire to play closer to home.

=== Featherstone Rovers ===
On 19 May 2024, it was reported that he had signed for fellow Championship club Featherstone Rovers. On 13 January 2025, Eden confirmed on Instagram that he had left Featherstone.

=== Hunslet RLFC ===
On 24 Jan 2025, it was reported that he had signed for fellow Championship club Hunslet RLFC.

=== North Wales Crusaders ===
On 9 December 2025 it was reported that he had signed for the newly-promoted North Wales Crusaders ahead of the Crusaders playing in the newly merged Championship.

==== Bradford Bulls (loan) ====
On 23 April 2026, it was reported that he had signed for newly-promoted Super League club Bradford Bulls on loan. On 18 May 2026, it was confirmed that Eden's loan period would not be extended and he would return to North Wales.

=== Sheffield Eagles ===
On 3 June 2026, it was reported that he had signed for fellow Championship club Sheffield Eagles.

== International career ==
In September 2012 Eden was selected in the England Knights squad.

Eden made his international début for England Knights on 28 October 2012 in the 62-24 Alitalia Cup series win over Scotland at the Meggetland Stadium in Edinburgh.

== Records and achievements ==
Eden scored his 100th try for Castleford on 14 April 2022 against Wakefield Trinity, becoming the 12th player to achieve this in the club's history and just the 2nd in the Super League era. He reached this figure after just 94 appearances for the Tigers, making him the fastest player to reach a century for the club.

Eden's 100 tries for Castleford in 94 appearances places him second for the fastest century at a single club in Super League, behind Josh Charnley's 100 in 91 games for the Wigan Warriors.

Castleford's most tries scored in a match record is 5-tries, and is jointly held by; Derek Foster against Hunslet on 10 November 1972, John Joyner against Millom on 16 September 1973, Stephen Fenton against Dewsbury on 27 January 1978, Ian French against Hunslet on 9 February 1986, St. John Ellis against Whitehaven on 10 December 1989, and Greg Eden against Warrington on 11 June 2017. Eden became the first player to achieve this for Castleford in the Super League era.

Eden's 41 tries for Castleford in 2017 places him second for the most tries scored in a single season for Castleford, behind Denny Solomona's 42 in 2016, ahead of St. John Ellis' 40 in 1993–94.

Eden's 38 Super League tries in 2017 places him second for the most tries scored in a single Super League season, behind Denny Solomona's 40 in 2016, ahead of Lesley Vainikolo's 36 in 2004.

Eden holds the record for fastest hat-trick in rugby league history; his treble against Leigh on 29 May 2017 took just 4 minutes 59 seconds, beating Shaun Johnson's record 6 minutes 30 seconds for the New Zealand Warriors against the Canberra Raiders in 2013.

Eden is believed to hold the record for the most consecutive hat-tricks; in 2017, he scored trebles in 4 successive matches (against St Helens, Leeds, Widnes and Leigh), which is believed to be a first in the professional game.

== Statistics ==
Appearances and points in all competitions by year
Club	Season	Tier	App	T	G	DG	Pts
Castleford Tigers	2011	Super League	3	1	0	0	4
Castleford Tigers	2017	Super League	31	41	0	0	164
Castleford Tigers	2018	Super League	15	18	0	0	72
Castleford Tigers	2019	Super League	21	13	0	0	52
Castleford Tigers	2020	Super League	8	8	0	0	32
Castleford Tigers	2021	Super League	9	8	0	0	32
Castleford Tigers	2022	Super League	20	14	0	0	56
Castleford Tigers	2023	Super League	15	9	0	0	36
Castleford Tigers	Total		122	112	0	0	448
Huddersfield Giants	2012	Super League	27	13	0	0	52
Hull Kingston Rovers	2013	Super League	22	14	0	0	56
Hull Kingston Rovers	2014	Super League	17	10	0	0	40
Hull Kingston Rovers	Total		39	24	0	0	96
→ Gateshead Thunder (DR)	2014	League 1	2	0	0	0	0
→ Salford Red Devils (loan)	2014	Super League	5	1	0	0	4
Brisbane Broncos	2015	NRL	0	0	0	0	0
Brisbane Broncos	2016	NRL	7	2	0	0	8
Brisbane Broncos	Total		7	2	0	0	8
→ Wynnum Manly Seagulls (R)	2015	Queensland Cup	22	16	0	0	64
→ Wynnum Manly Seagulls (R)	2016	Queensland Cup	8	5	0	0	20
→ Wynnum Manly Seagulls (R)	Total		30	21	0	0	84
Halifax Panthers	2024	Championship	9	5	0	0	20
Featherstone Rovers	2024	Championship	15	1	0	0	4
Hunslet RLFC	2025	Championship	12	4	0	0	16
North Wales Crusaders	2026	Championship	11	10	0	0	40
→ Bradford Bulls (loan)	2026	Super League	2	1	0	0	4
Sheffield Eagles	2026	Championship	11	8	0	0	32
Sheffield Eagles	2027	Championship	0	0	0	0	0
Sheffield Eagles	Total		11	8	0	0	32
Career total			292	202	0	0	808

As of match played 13 September 2026
