= Jordan Rankin =

Australian rugby league footballer (born 1991)

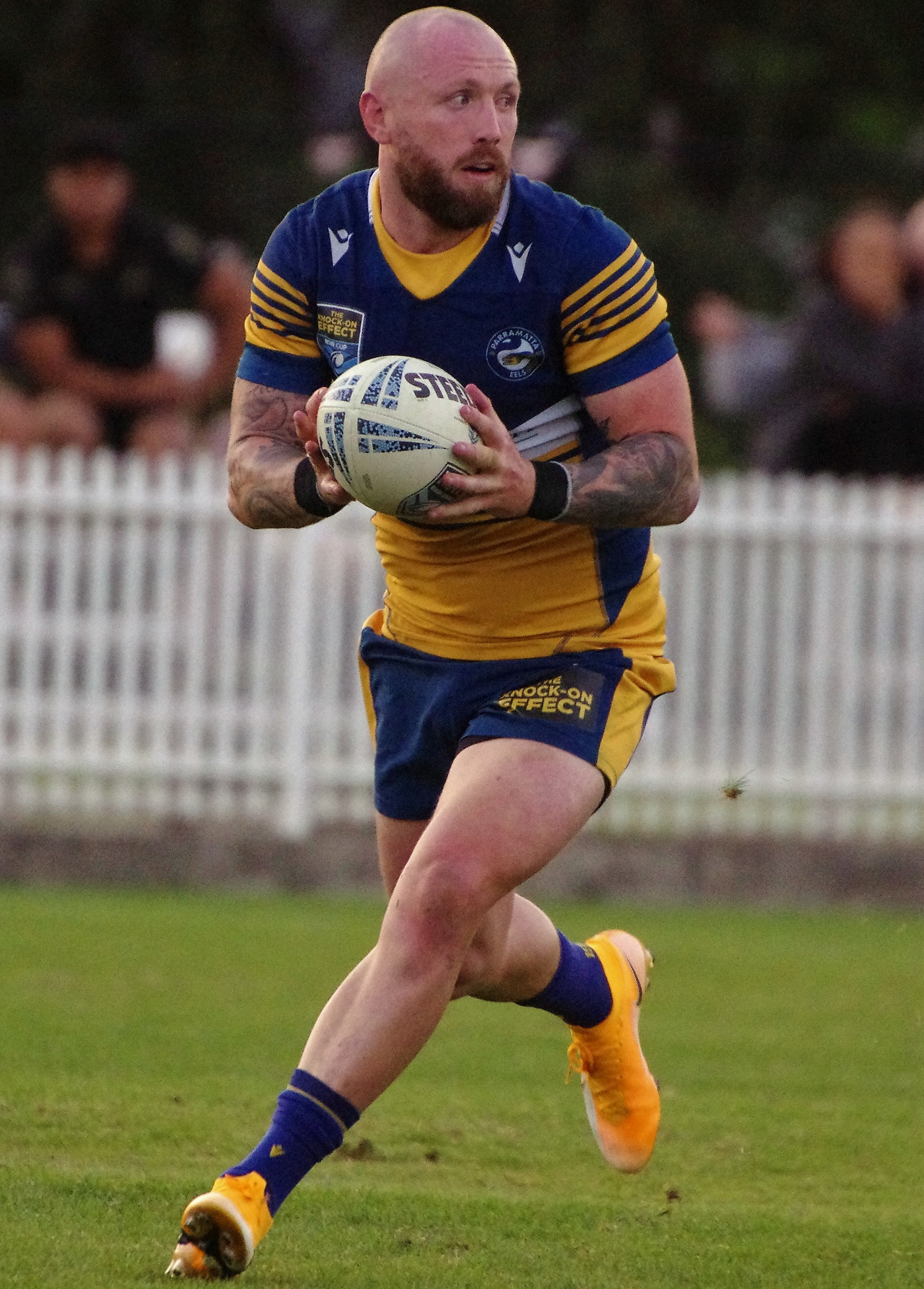

Personal information
- Born: 17 December 1991 (age 34) Gold Coast, Queensland, Australia

Playing information
- Height: 183 cm (6 ft 0 in)
- Weight: 93 kg (14 st 9 lb)
- Position: Fullback, Five-eighth, Halfback, Wing
Club
Years	Team	Pld	T	G	FG	P
2008–13	Gold Coast Titans	17	1	0	0	4
2014–15	Hull F.C.	50	24	50	0	196
2015(DR)	→ Doncaster	2	0	0	0	0
2016–17	Wests Tigers	23	7	28	0	84
2017–20	Huddersfield Giants	41	3	9	0	30
2019(loan)	→ Castleford Tigers	24	10	19	0	78
2020(loan)	→ Castleford Tigers	7	0	0	0	0
	Total	164	45	106	0	392

Jordan Rankin (born 17 December 1991) is an Australian former professional rugby league footballer who last played as a fullback, five-eighth or halfback for the Huddersfield Giants in the Super League.

He previously played for the Gold Coast Titans and the Wests Tigers in the National Rugby League, and Hull F.C. and the Huddersfield Giants in the Super League. He spent time at Doncaster in the Championship on dual registration from Hull, as well as two separate loans from Huddersfield at the Castleford Tigers in the Super League.

== Background ==
Rankin was born in Gold Coast, Queensland, Australia and is of Australian descent.

== Playing career ==
=== Gold Coast Titans ===
Rankin started the 2008 season playing S. G. Ball for the Titans before he was promoted to the club's National Youth Competition team in June.

At 16 years and 238 days, Rankin became the third youngest player to make their début in Australian first-grade rugby league after coming off the bench for the Titans against the Newcastle Knights in round 22. Eastern Suburbs player Ray Stehr in 1929 and Wests' Jack Arnold in 1936 are the only two players younger than Rankin on debut. Selected for the Australian Schoolboys side to play touring teams from England and France, Rankin was required to withdraw from the representative team in order to train with the Titans squad ahead of the game.

After his debut, Rankin returned to the club's NYC team, where he would stay for the remainder of the 2008 season. Rankin later said, "I'm not going to say I wasn't thrown in too young but it was an opportunity I took ... that I was given... it is one of those things I have to live with now. Sixteen is obviously, when you look at it now, a bit young."

In August 2008, Rankin re-signed with the Titans on a three-year deal.

Rankin didn't add to his NRL game tally in either the 2009 or 2010 seasons, instead playing in the NYC for the Titans. After 2 seasons without a single NRL game, Rankin returned in round 16 against the Cronulla-Sutherland Sharks. He later said, "I played one game and didn't play for another two years and that dents your confidence. I didn't play my natural game, I played a bit more conservative

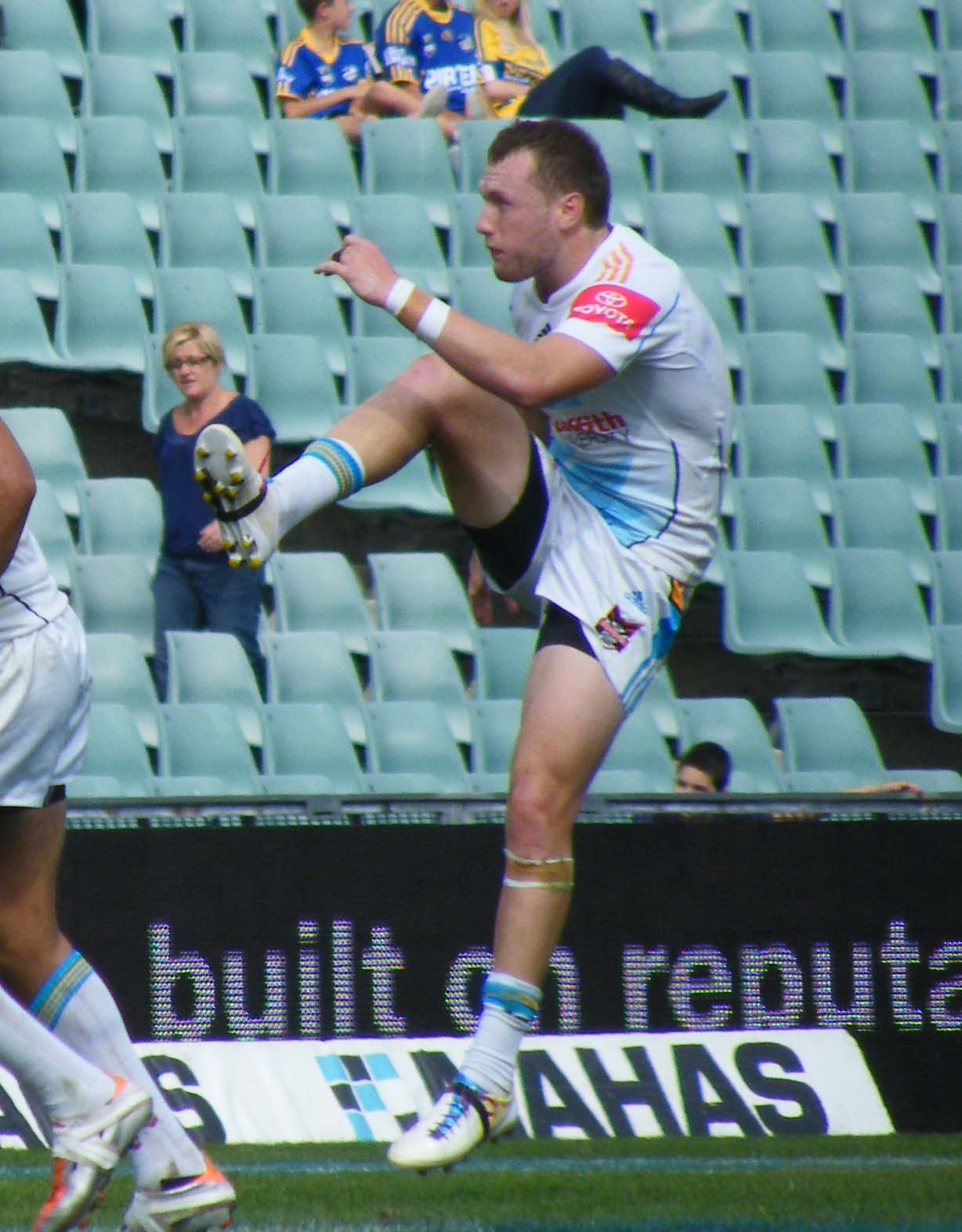
Rankin playing for the Gold Coast Titans in 2011

He played 8 NRL games during the 2011 season.

=== Hull F.C. ===
In late 2013 English Super League club Hull F.C. announced the signing of Rankin on a 2-year deal as a direct replacement for outgoing half Daniel Holdsworth. He scored a try on his Super League début against the Catalans Dragons.

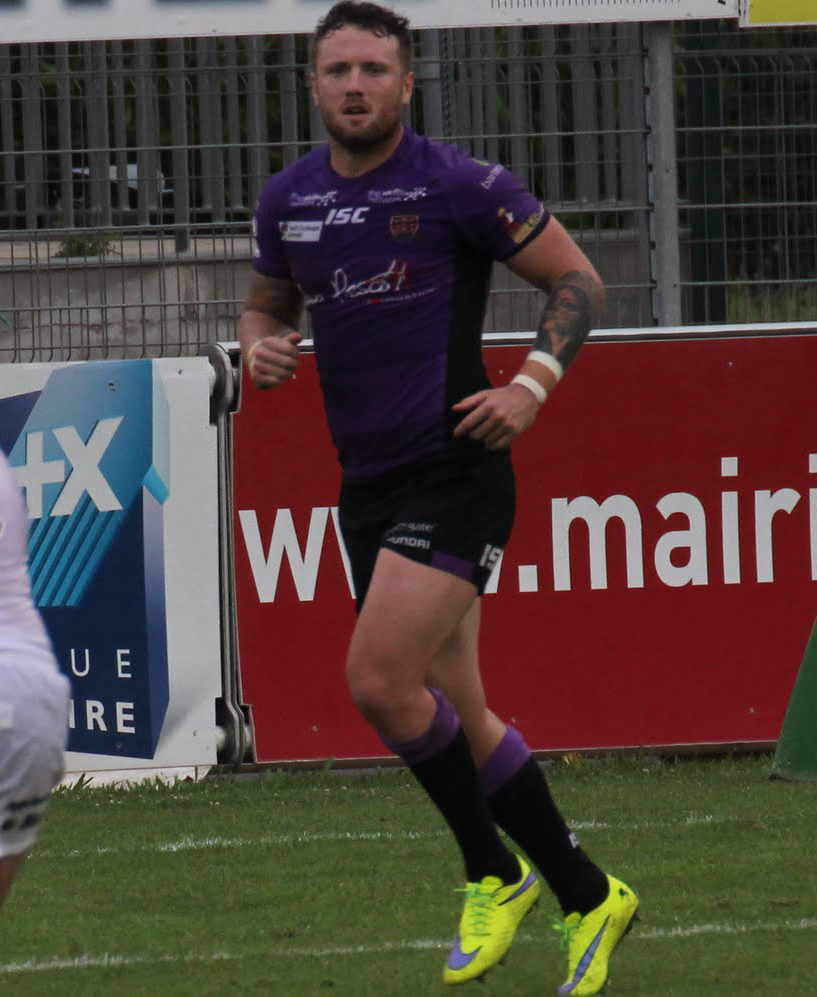
Rankin playing for Hull FC in 2015

==== Doncaster (dual registration) ====
Rankin played two Championship matches for English club Doncaster in 2015.

=== Wests Tigers ===
On 15 September 2015, Rankin signed a 2-year contract to return to the National Rugby League with the Wests Tigers starting in 2016. He played on the wing in the first round match against the New Zealand Warriors, saying, "I wouldn't say it's my début all over again. I feel like I've got the opportunity now to play as a more experienced first-grade footy player." The next week, he scored his first try for the club against Manly.

Remaining on the wing, Rankin took over the team's goal-kicking duties in round 6. In round 9, he moved to fullback in the second half of the game after an injury to James Tedesco. He was awarded Man of the Match and finished with 2 tries and 7 tackle breaks.

Rankin mostly played reserve grade for Wests Tigers in 2017, making one appearance at halfback in round 11.

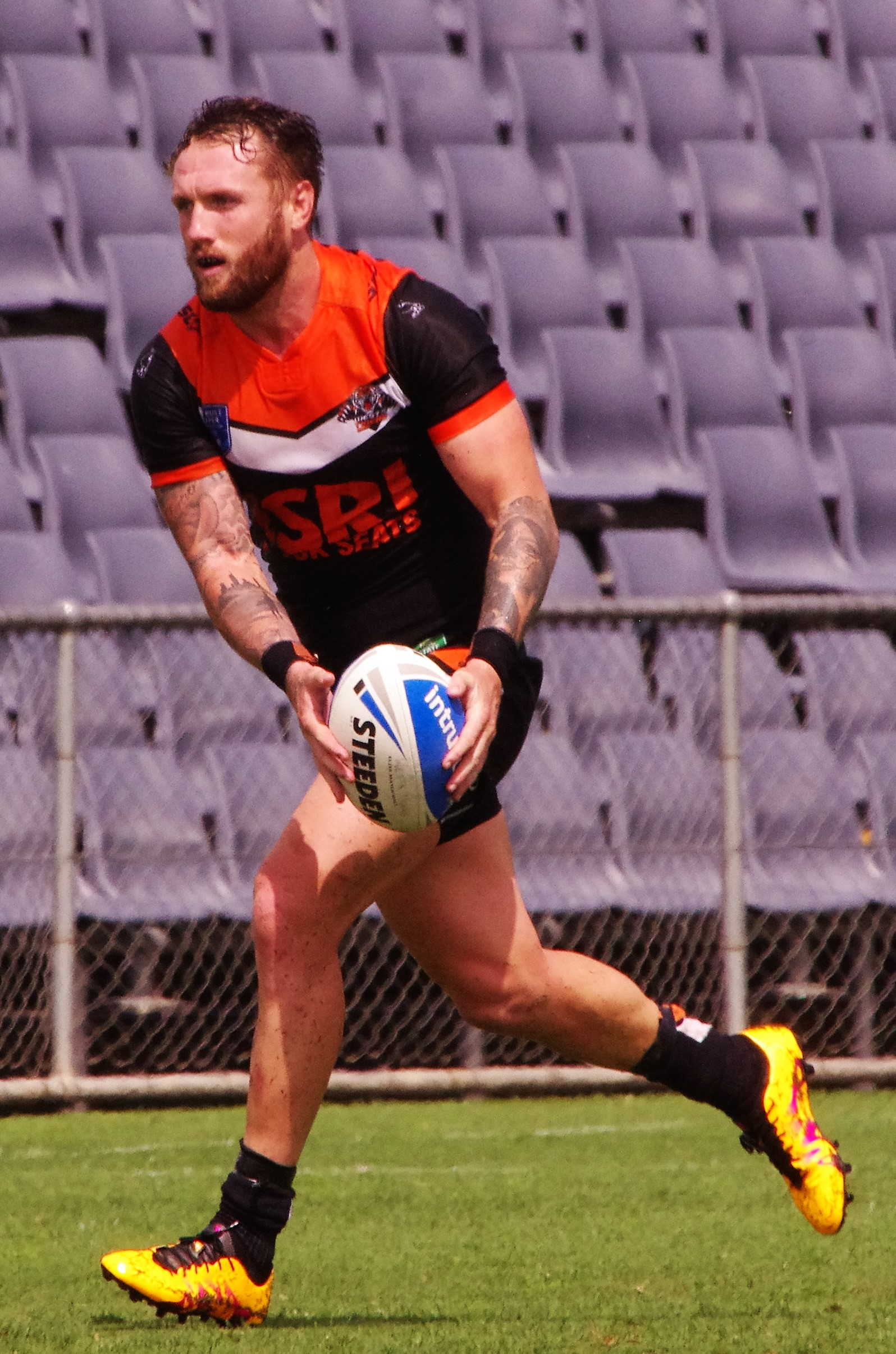
Rankin playing for the Tigers in 2017

Weeks later he was released to join the Huddersfield Giants immediately.

=== Huddersfield Giants ===
In June 2017, Huddersfield Giants announced the signing of Rankin on a deal to the end of the 2017 season. New coach Rick Stone said, "The main attraction in Jordan Rankin is his ability to play in nearly every position in the back line. He's played in the outside-backs, he's played in the halves and he's played a whole NRL season on the wing." In August 2017 the move was made permanent with a three-year deal.

=== Castleford Tigers ===
In January 2019, Rankin signed for Castleford Tigers as part of a deal that saw Joe Wardle move the other way. The deal was initially a loan for both parties, but Castleford state that there is "interest from all sides to make this a permanent move". The transfer came about as a result of a serious injury to Castleford's key halfback Luke Gale – Gale suffered a ruptured Achilles tendon in pre-season training, ruling him out for the entirety of the upcoming season. In light of this injury, the Tigers were awarded Salary Cap relief by the RFL but following the announcement of Rankin's arrival it was confirmed by Castleford Director of Rugby Jon Wells that this had not yet been made use of.

Rankin was assigned squad number 32 for the 2019 campaign, and began the season playing halfback for Castleford. Following a mid-season hamstring injury, which kept him out for 8 games, Rankin played the majority of matches at fullback. A number of good performances established him as the Tigers' first choice in this position, and he was integral in Castleford's push for the playoffs. Rankin scored a try and was voted as Fans Man of the Match for the Tigers' Elimination final victory over Warrington Wolves in the playoffs. Rankin was named as the Castleford Tigers Supporters Club committee player of the year at the end of the 2019 season.

In October 2019 Castleford confirmed that Rankin would remain at the club for the 2020 season, with Joe Wardle also remaining at Huddersfield as part of the deal. Castleford head coach Daryl Powell added: "Jordan has been outstanding for us this season and we are delighted to have him on board moving forward." Rankin was given squad number 1 for 2020, having firmly cemented himself as the Tigers' first choice fullback. He made 7 appearances throughout February and March, playing in every game for Castleford until the season was suspended due to the COVID-19 pandemic.

On 25 May 2020, it was announced that Rankin had been granted a release from both Castleford and parent club Huddersfield on compassionate grounds to allow him to return to Australia. He commented, "I'm disappointed to be cutting my time short here in the UK but my family comes first and that's always been first and foremost for me. I want to thank both clubs for giving me the opportunity to play, to play in Super League and I've really enjoyed it, my time at Cas especially. I'll always have fond memories of playing at the club and I'll always appreciate that I was given the chance."

=== Parramatta Eels ===
On 20 June 2020, Rankin signed a contract to join Parramatta. Rankin made no appearances for Parramatta in the 2020 NRL season.

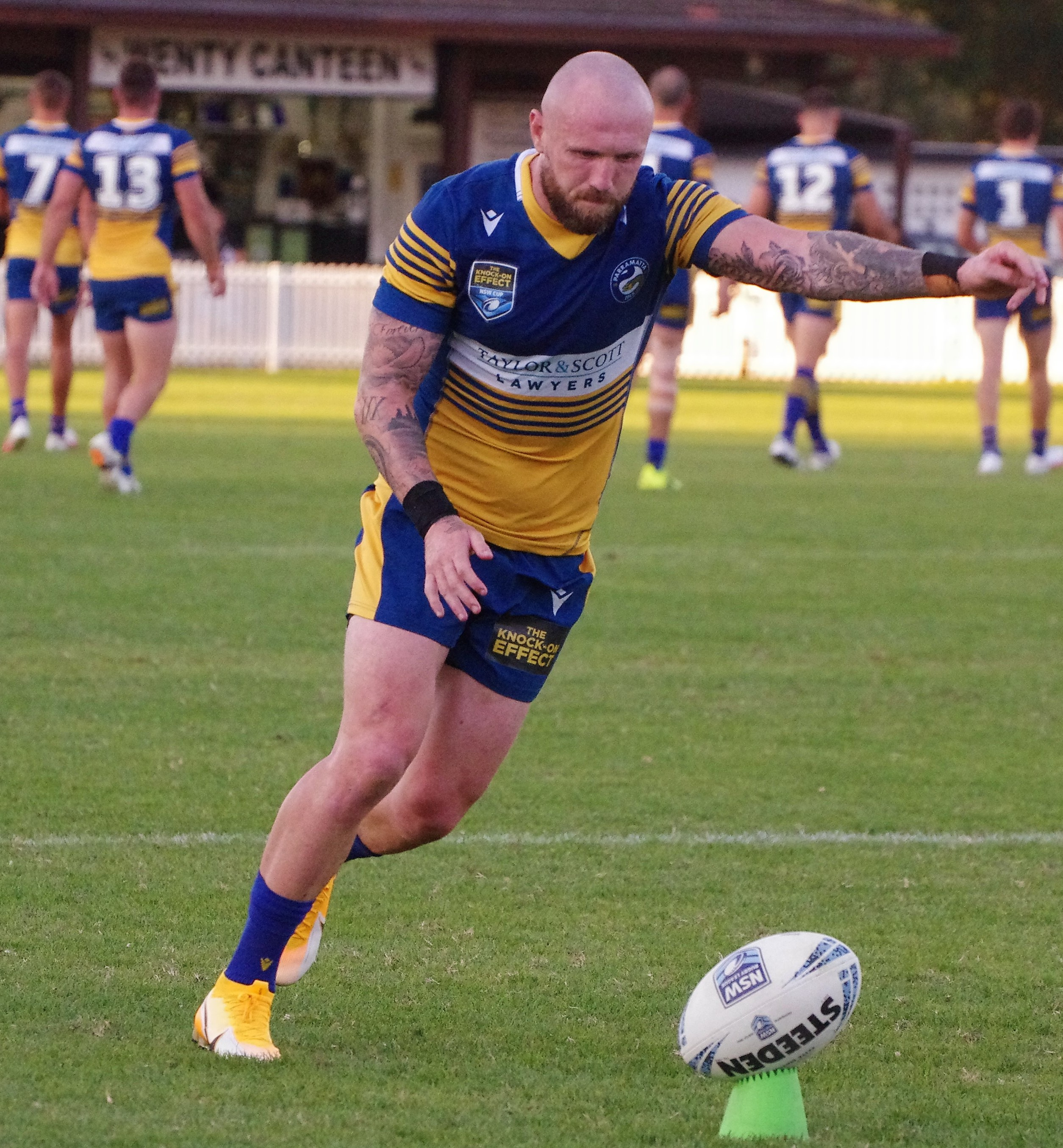
Rankin playing for Parramatta in 2021

In 2021 he spent time playing in the NSW Cup.

On 14 June 2022, Parramatta announced Rankin would take up a coaching role for their NSW Cup team becoming Captain/Coach.

In 2023, while still playing and captaining the NSW Cup side, he was also an assistant coach to Parramatta's premiership winning SG Ball Cup side.

Following retirement at the end of the 2023 season, Rankin was appointed Head Coach for the Parramatta Eels Jersey Flegg program for the 2024 season.

== Statistics ==
Season	Team	Pld	T	G	FG	Pts
2008	Gold Coast Titans	1	-	-	-	-
2009	Gold Coast Titans	-	-	-	-	-
2010	Gold Coast Titans	-	-	-	-	-
2011	Gold Coast Titans	8	-	-	-	-
2012	Gold Coast Titans	6	1	-	-	4
2013	Gold Coast Titans	2	-	-	-	-
2014	Hull FC	22	10	34	-	108
2015	Doncaster	2	-	-	-	-
2015	Hull FC	28	14	16	-	88
2016	Wests Tigers	22	7	28	-	84
2017	Wests Tigers	1	-	-	-	-
2017	Huddersfield Giants	11	1	5	-	14
2018	Huddersfield Giants	30	2	4	-	16
2019	Castleford Tigers	24	10	19	-	78
2020*	Castleford Tigers	7	-	-	-	-
	Totals	164	45	106	-	392

(* denotes season still competing)
