= Daniel Igbinedion =

Professional Rugby League player

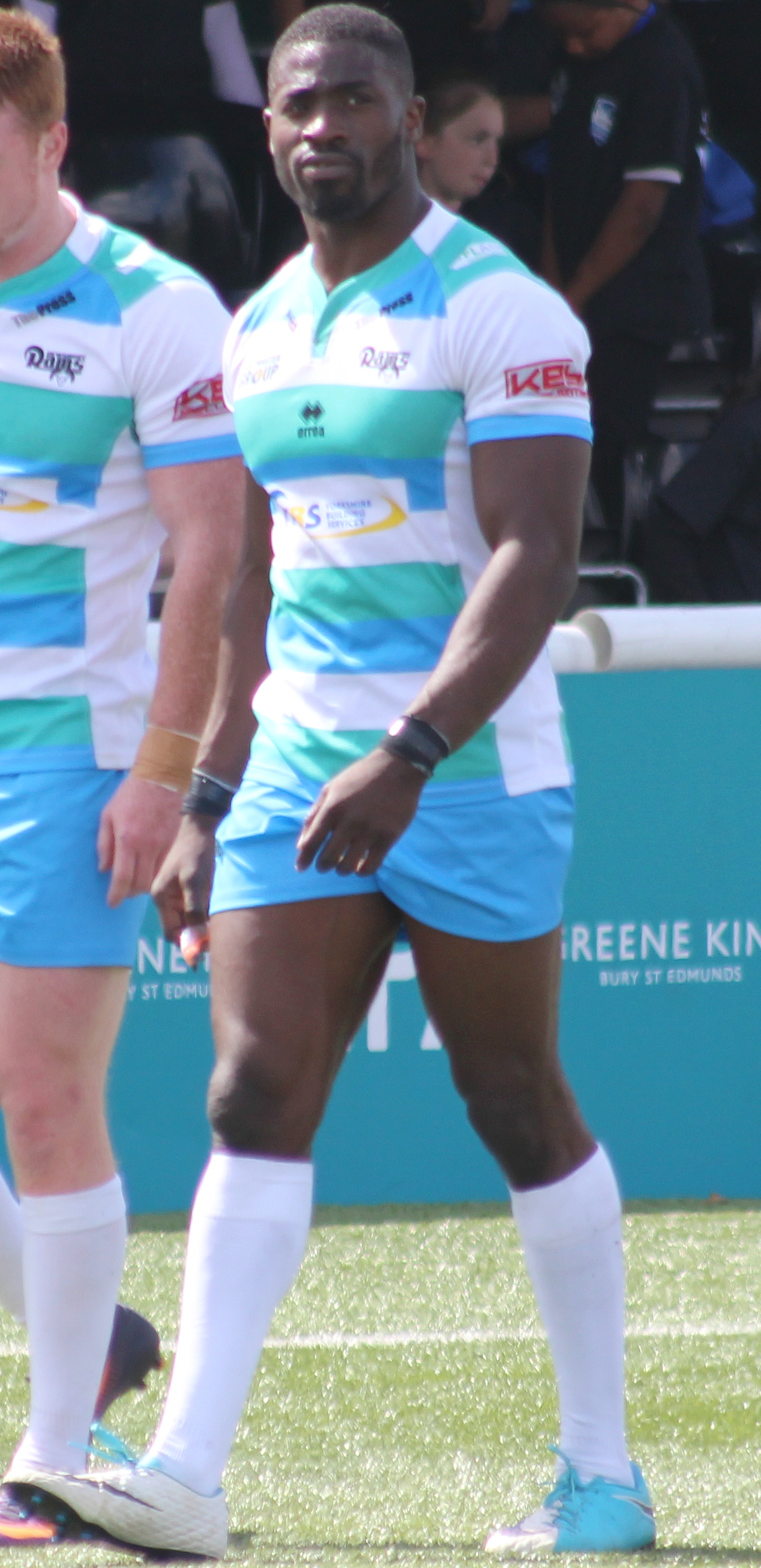

Personal information
- Born: 26 January 1995 (age 30)
- Height: 6 ft 2 in (1.87 m)
- Weight: 16 st 1 lb (102 kg)

Playing information
- Position: Prop, Second-row
Club
Years	Team	Pld	T	G	FG	P
2016–17	Oxford	21	0	0	0	0
2017	Castleford Tigers	0	0	0	0	0
2017(loan)	→ Dewsbury Rams	15	1	0	0	4
2017	Featherstone Rovers	3	0	0	0	0
2018	Sheffield Eagles	7	1	0	0	4
2018–19	Dewsbury Rams	32	8	0	0	36
2020	Oldham R.L.F.C.	1	0	0	0	0
	Total	79	10	0	0	44
- Source: As of 21 December 2021

Daniel Igbinedion is a rugby league footballer who plays as a prop. He played most recently for the Oldham Roughyeds in the Championship.

== Playing career ==
He began his professional career with Oxford, having begun in London Broncos' youth set-up, before moving to Super League side Castleford Tigers. Despite not making a senior appearance for the Tigers under the stewardship of Daryl Powell, Igbinedion impressed during a loan spell at the Dewsbury Rams. In 2017 he made his Challenge Cup début for Dewsbury against Newcastle Thunder. He then went on to play 14 more senior appearances for the championship side before being snapped up by fellow league side Featherstone Rovers.

However, he failed to make an impact in the team as he only played three games in the senior side at Featherstone and on 29 November 2017 it was announced Igbinedion was to join the Sheffield Eagles ahead of the 2018 season.

During the 2018 season Igbinedion rejoined Dewsbury on a permanent basis and made a further 32 appearances before joining Oldham on 1 January 2020.

After just a single appearance for Oldham, Iginedion was released by the club.

== Personal life ==
In October 2021 Igbinedion was found guilty, at Bradford Crown Court, of controlling and coercive behaviour and three counts of assault on his former girlfriend. On 21 December 2021 he was sentenced to 39 months imprisonment for the offences.
