= Paul McShane (rugby league) =

English professional rugby league footballer

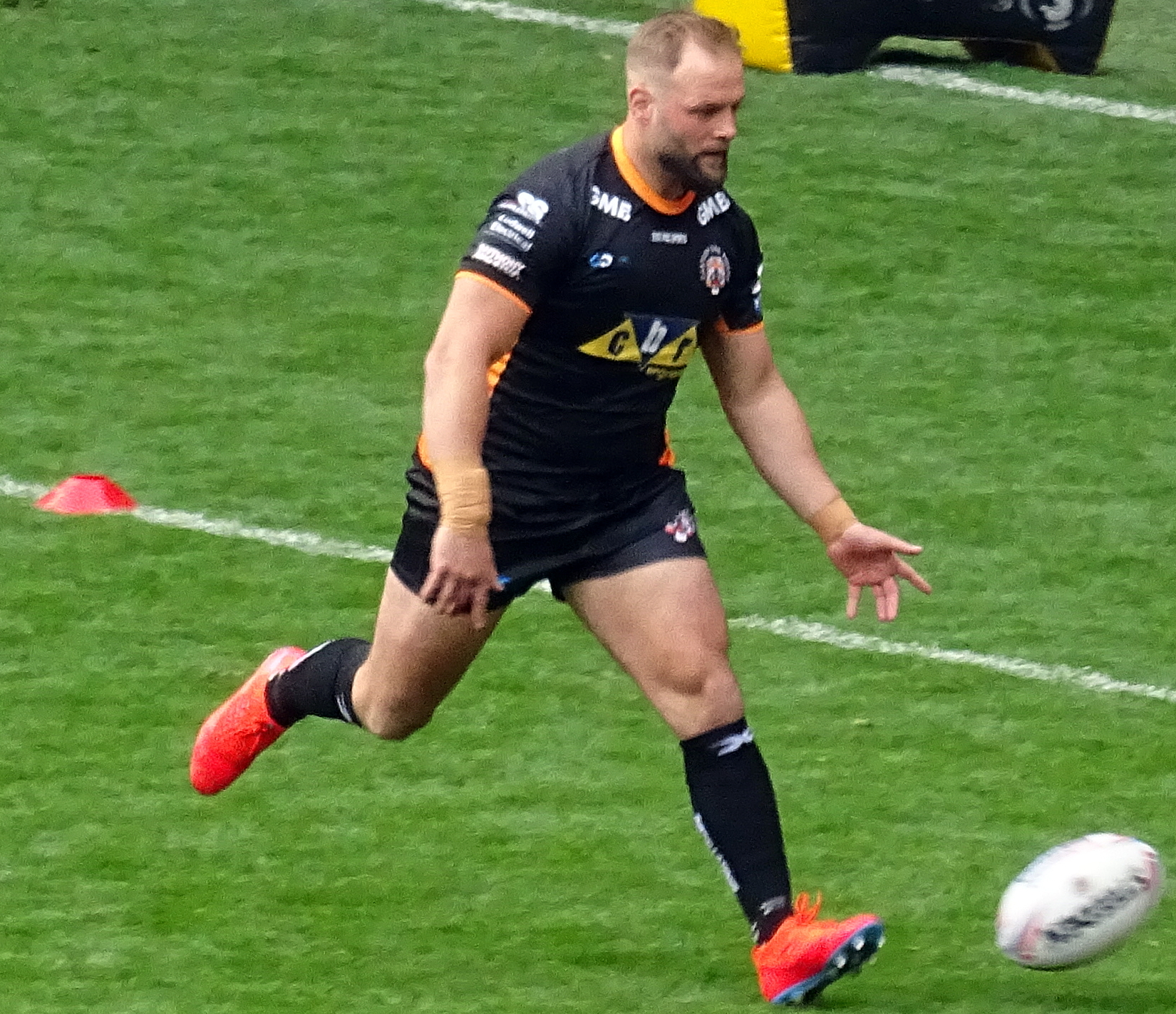

Personal information
- Full name: Paul Bernard McShane
- Born: 19 November 1989 (age 36) Leeds, West Yorkshire, England
- Height: 5 ft 6 in (1.68 m)
- Weight: 14 st 5 lb (91 kg)

Playing information
- Position: Hooker, Scrum-half
Club
Years	Team	Pld	T	G	FG	P
2009–13	Leeds Rhinos	63	14	0	0	56
2010(loan)	→ Hull F.C.	4	0	0	0	0
2012(loan)	→ Widnes Vikings	11	3	4	0	20
2013(DR)	→ Hunslet Hawks	1	0	2	0	4
2014–15	Wakefield Trinity Wildcats	51	6	0	0	24
2015–24	Castleford Tigers	223	31	69	2	264
2025–	York Knights	32	4	9	0	34
	Total	385	58	84	2	402
Representative
Years	Team	Pld	T	G	FG	P
2021–22	England	3	0	0	0	0
- Source: As of 6 September 2026

Paul McShane (born 19 November 1989) is an English professional rugby league footballer who plays as a hooker or scrum-half for the York Knights in the Super League. He has played for England at international level, and was the recipient of the Man of Steel award in 2020.

McShane began his career with the Leeds Rhinos, where he progressed through the academy and played for five seasons, winning the 2012 World Club Challenge. During this time he also featured on loan for Hull FC, the Widnes Vikings and the Hunslet Hawks. He signed for the Wakefield Trinity Wildcats in 2014 and spent two years there. Partway through the 2015 season, McShane joined the Castleford Tigers, where he would go on to spend the majority of his career. Across a 10-year stay, he made 223 appearances and scored 31 tries, 69 goals and 2 drop goals. He played in the 2017 Grand Final and 2021 Challenge Cup final, won the 2017 League Leaders' Shield, and was appointed Castleford club captain from 2022 until his departure at the end of 2024. He joined the York Knights ahead of 2025.

== Background ==
McShane was born in Belle Isle,Leeds, West Yorkshire, England.

McShane was captain of the Merlyn Rees High School team. He joined the Leeds Rhinos' academy from Hunslet Hawks in 2006. He was named Junior Academy Player of the Year in 2007 and kicked five goals in their Grand Final win over St Helens.

McShane was named in the England U18 Academy squad to tour Australia in June 2008.

== Club career ==
=== Leeds Rhinos ===
McShane signed a five-year contract with Leeds in July 2008, keeping him at the club until at least 2013.

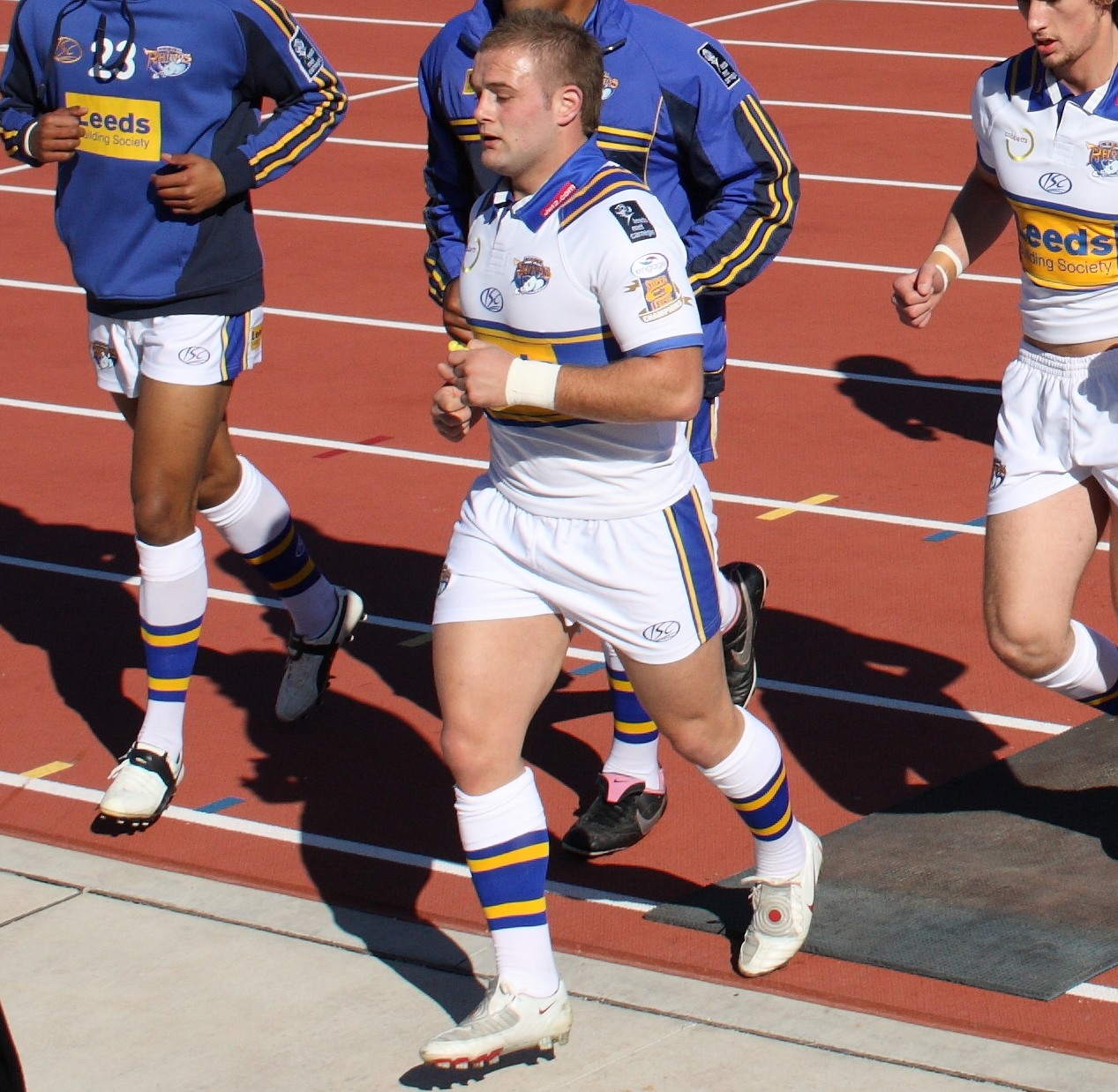
McShane coming off the field for the Leeds Rhinos in Florida in 2009

He made his first team debut on the opening day of the 2009 Super League season against Crusaders at Headingley. He made two further appearances in 2009, including his first start against Warrington Wolves.

McShane was a replacement in the Leeds side that won the 2012 World Club Challenge, beating Manly-Warringah 26–12.

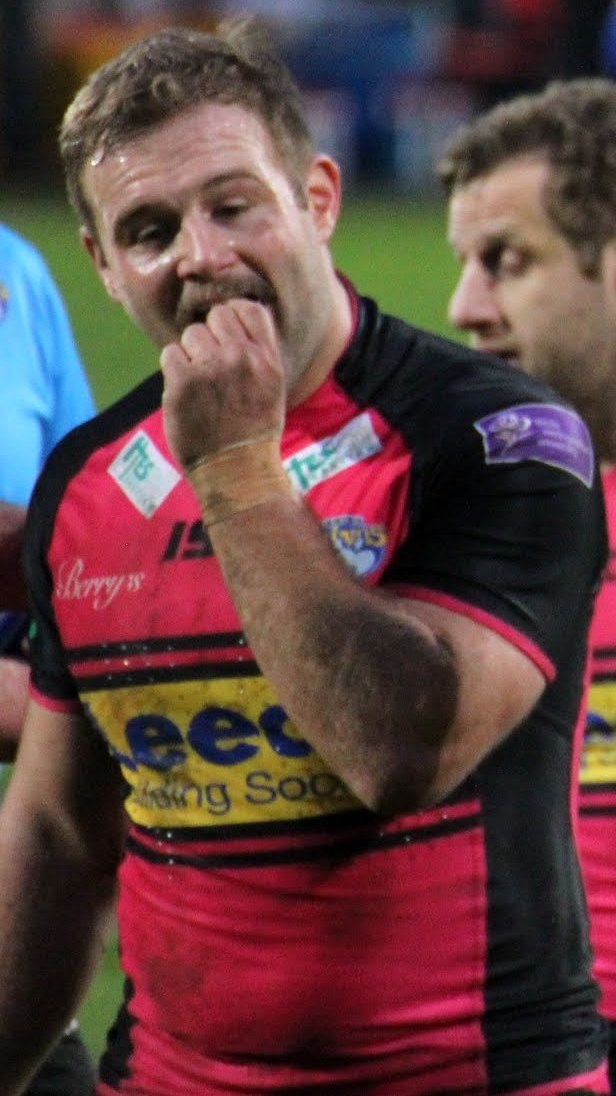
McShane playing for the Leeds Rhinos in 2013

In 2013, McShane made 23 appearances for Leeds. However, at the end of the season, Leeds agreed to release McShane from his contract and placed him on the transfer list.

==== Hull F.C. (loan) ====
In April 2010, McShane signed for Hull F.C. on a one-month loan deal. He made 4 appearances for the club. McShane made a further 9 Super League appearances for Leeds in 2010. He also scored his first try, against Harlequins RL.

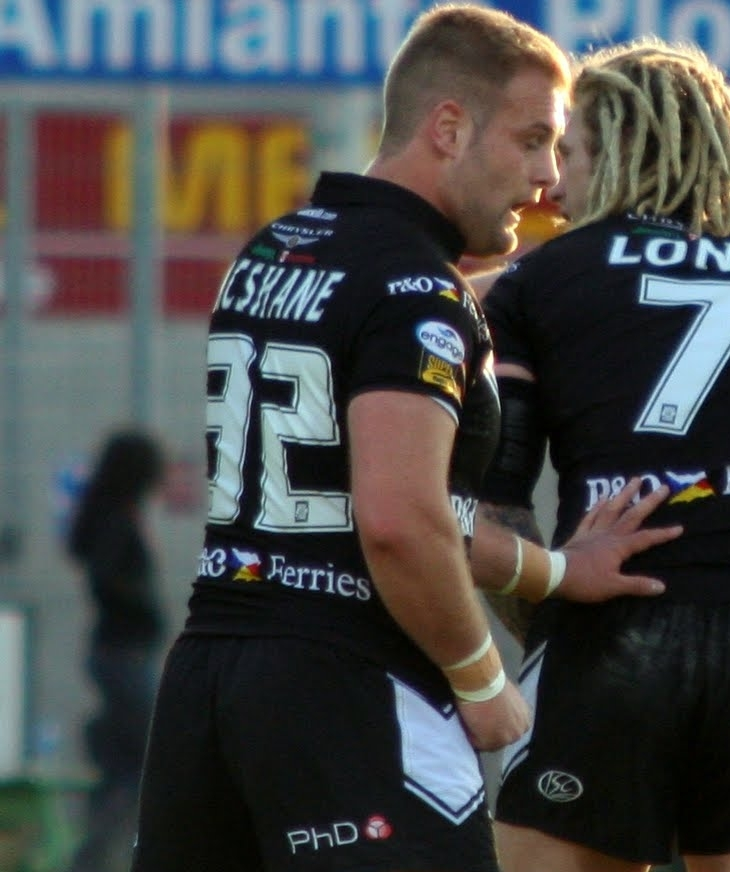
McShane playing for Hull FC in 2010

==== Widnes Vikings (loan) ====
In May 2012, Widnes Vikings signed McShane on a loan deal for the rest of the season. McShane made 11 appearances during this period, scoring 3 tries and kicking 4 goals.

==== Hunslet Hawks (DR) ====
McShane played for the Hunslet Hawks in the RFL Championship during 2013, through their dual registration arrangement with Leeds.

=== Wakefield Trinity Wildcats ===
McShane was signed by Wakefield Trinity Wildcats in November 2013.

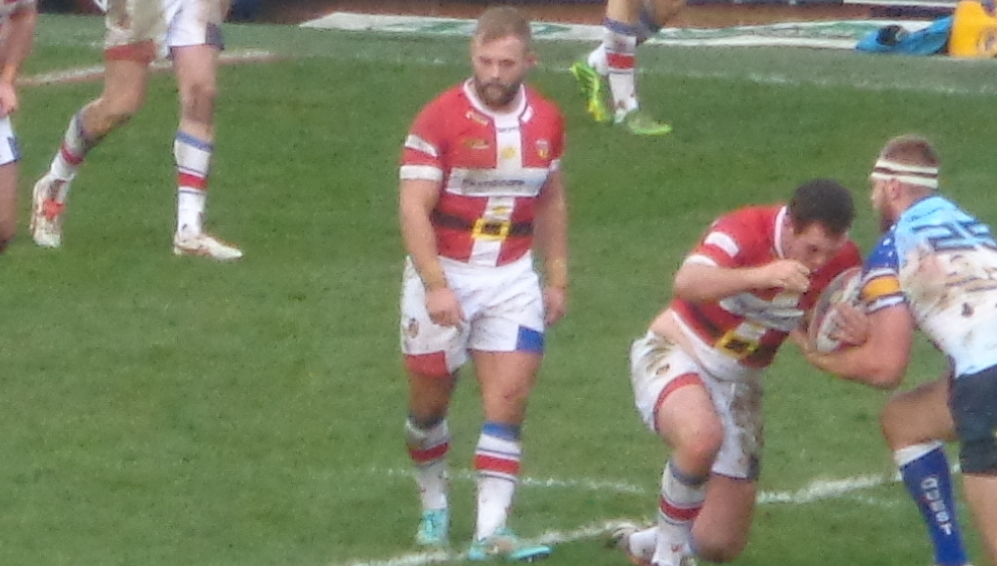
McShane playing for Wakefield in December 2014

=== Castleford Tigers ===
In July 2015, McShane joined Castleford on a two-and-a-half-year contract as part of a deal that saw Scott Moore move the other way on loan. He made his club debut against Hull F.C. in the first game of the Super 8s.

McShane was ever-present for Castleford in the 2016 season, appearing in every game. He was an integral part of the 2017 squad that won the League Leaders' Shield and he played in the 2017 Super League Grand Final defeat by Leeds at Old Trafford. He was named Castleford Tigers' 3rd Place 2017 Player of the Year.

In January 2018, it was announced that McShane had signed a new five-year deal with the Tigers. McShane had an outstanding personal season for Castleford in 2018, branded "unlucky" not to be nominated for the Man of Steel award by two-time winner Paul Sculthorpe. He dominated the club's end-of-season awards, being recognised as the Fans' Player of the Year, Directors' Player of the Year, Players' Player of the Year, and 1st Place Player of the Year.

Despite disruption due to injuries within Castleford's squad and the COVID-19 pandemic, McShane appeared in every game in 2020. In November, McShane was voted Super League's 2020 Man of Steel – Castleford head coach Daryl Powell said, "He is one of the best nines in the game bar none and his all-round game is fantastic." He became the first player since 2011 to win the award with his team failing to qualify for the play-offs.

McShane signed a new three-year deal with Castleford in July 2021, extending his contract to the end of 2025. On 17 July 2021, he played for Castleford in their 2021 Challenge Cup final loss against St Helens at Wembley Stadium. In recognition of his continued outstanding form, McShane was named Directors' Player of the Year and won the Immortals Award, voted for by Castleford legends, at the club's 2021 end-of-season awards.

Following the retirement of Michael Shenton, McShane was named as the new Castleford captain in January 2022. He made 28 appearances throughout the season, missing just one game through suspension.

In the 2023 season, McShane scored a try against Wakefield on 6 April in a key victory against Castleford's relegation rivals. He made 14 appearances in total, also kicking eight goals. On 9 June, during the defeat against Salford, he sustained a fractured forearm which would force him to miss the remaining months of the season.

McShane was awarded a testimonial year for the 2024 season. Castleford faced the Huddersfield Giants for his testimonial match on 4 February. Shortly before the first round, McShane suffered a hamstring injury which ruled him out for the opening six weeks. After nine months on the sidelines, McShane made his competitive return on 23 March against Batley in the Challenge Cup and marked the occasion by scoring a try and two goals. In late May, complications arose regarding his previous arm injury and he underwent surgery to remove the orthopedic plates. On 5 September, it was announced that McShane would retire from playing full-time at the end of the season, and he received a guard of honour at his final home game.

=== York Knights ===
On 6 November 2024, it was announced that McShane had signed for the York Knights in the RFL Championship on a two-year deal. In addition to his playing duties, he would also join the coaching staff and work alongside Mark Applegarth. On 7 June 2025, he played in York's 1895 Cup final victory over Featherstone.

== International career ==
McShane was first named in England's elite performance squad in May 2017.

McShane was named in Shaun Wane's first England squad in March 2020, in preparation for the end-of-season Ashes series. However, the series was later cancelled due to the COVID-19 pandemic.

McShane earned his first senior England cap against the Combined Nations All Stars on 25 June 2021 at the Halliwell Jones Stadium. He represented England in their 30–10 victory over France at the Stade Gilbert Brutus on 23 October 2021.

== Club statistics ==
Appearances and points in all competitions by year
Club	Season	Tier	App	T	G	DG	Pts
Leeds Rhinos	2009	Super League	3	0	0	0	0
Leeds Rhinos	2010	Super League	9	1	0	0	4
Leeds Rhinos	2011	Super League	18	5	0	0	20
Leeds Rhinos	2012	Super League	9	1	0	0	4
Leeds Rhinos	2013	Super League	24	7	0	0	28
Leeds Rhinos	Total		63	14	0	0	56
→ Hull F.C. (loan)	2010	Super League	4	0	0	0	0
→ Widnes Vikings (loan)	2012	Super League	11	3	4	0	20
→ Hunslet Hawks (DR)	2013	Championship	1	0	2	0	4
Wakefield Trinity	2014	Super League	27	3	0	0	12
Wakefield Trinity	2015	Super League	24	3	0	0	12
Wakefield Trinity	Total		51	6	0	0	24
Castleford Tigers	2015	Super League	6	0	0	0	0
Castleford Tigers	2016	Super League	32	7	4	0	36
Castleford Tigers	2017	Super League	33	4	17	0	50
Castleford Tigers	2018	Super League	31	8	10	0	52
Castleford Tigers	2019	Super League	28	1	12	0	28
Castleford Tigers	2020	Super League	18	2	0	0	8
Castleford Tigers	2021	Super League	21	5	11	2	44
Castleford Tigers	2022	Super League	28	1	5	0	14
Castleford Tigers	2023	Super League	15	1	8	0	20
Castleford Tigers	2024	Super League	11	2	2	0	12
Castleford Tigers	Total		223	31	69	2	264
York Knights	2025	Championship	32	4	10	0	36
York Knights	2026	Super League	0	0	0	0	0
York Knights	Total		32	4	10	0	36
Career total			385	58	85	2	404

As of match played 5 October 2025
