= Conor Fitzsimmons =

English rugby league footballer

Personal information
- Full name: Conor Fitzsimmons
- Born: 7 May 1998 (age 27) Workington, Cumbria, England
- Height: 6 ft 0 in (1.83 m)
- Weight: 16 st 7 lb (105 kg)

Playing information
- Position: Loose forward, Second-row
Club
Years	Team	Pld	T	G	FG	P
2016–17	Castleford Tigers	2	0	0	0	0
2017(loan)	→ Workington Town	22	2	0	0	8
2018–19	Newcastle Thunder	48	11	0	0	44
2020–22	Workington Town	49	9	0	0	36
2023–25	York Knights	68	12	0	0	48
2026–	Sheffield Eagles	0	0	0	0	0
	Total	189	34	0	0	136
- Source: As of 14 October 2025

Conor Fitzsimmons (born 7 May 1998) is a professional rugby league footballer who plays as a second-row or loose forward for the Sheffield Eagles in RFL Championship.

== Playing career ==
=== Castleford Tigers ===
Fitzsimmons commenced his top-level playing career in the 2016 Super League season with Castleford.

=== Newcastle Thunder ===
In November 2017 he signed for Newcastle. He has previously played for English Super League club Castleford and spent the 2017 season on loan with Workington Town.

=== Workington Town ===
Fitzsimmons signed for Workington Town for the 2020 season and was named their 'Player of the Year' in 2022.

=== York City Knights ===
In October 2022, he joined the York RLFC on a two-year deal.

=== Sheffield Eagles ===
On 14 October 2025 it was reported that he had joined Sheffield Eagles on a two-year deal.
