= Jake Sweeting =

English rugby league footballer

Personal information
- Full name: Jake Sweeting
- Born: 15 December 1999 (age 25)

Playing information
- Position: Scrum-half, Stand-off, Hooker, Fullback
Club
| Years | Team | Pld | T | G | FG | P |
|---|---|---|---|---|---|---|
| 2020–21 | Castleford Tigers | 1 | 1 | 0 | 0 | 4 |
| 2020(loan) | → Featherstone Rovers | 2 | 2 | 0 | 0 | 8 |
| 2021(loan) | → Hunslet RLFC | 1 | 0 | 0 | 0 | 0 |
| 2021(loan) | → York City Knights | 1 | 0 | 0 | 0 | 0 |
| 2021(loan) | → Featherstone Rovers | 1 | 0 | 0 | 0 | 0 |
| 2021(loan) | → Doncaster RLFC | 10 | 5 | 13 | 0 | 46 |
| 2022 | Dewsbury Rams | 16 | 1 | 0 | 0 | 4 |
| 2022(loan) | → Hunslet RLFC | 1 | 0 | 4 | 0 | 8 |
| 2023 | Hunslet RLFC | 13 | 4 | 48 | 0 | 112 |
| 2023 | Keighley Cougars | 1 | 0 | 0 | 0 | 0 |
| 2023(loan) | → Midlands Hurricanes | 2 | 2 | 0 | 0 | 8 |
| 2024–25 | Midlands Hurricanes | 26 | 7 | 86 | 0 | 200 |
| | Total | 75 | 22 | 151 | 0 | 390 |
- Source: As of 19 October 2025

Jake Sweeting (born 15 December 1999) is an English professional rugby league player who last played as a scrum-half or stand-off for Midlands Hurricanes in the Betfred League 1.

He previously played for the Castleford Tigers in the Super League, and spent time on loan from the Tigers at Featherstone Rovers, Hunslet, York City Knights and Doncaster. Sweeting has also featured on loan from Dewsbury at Hunslet in League 1.

== Playing career ==
=== Castleford Tigers ===
In 2021 he made his Super League début for Castleford against the Huddersfield Giants.

=== Keighley Cougars ===
On 22 Jun 2023 it was reported that he had signed for Keighley Cougars in the RFL League 1

=== Midlands Hurricanes (loan) ===
On 3 Aug 2023 it was reported that he had signed for Midlands Hurricanes in the RFL League 1 on loan

=== Midlands Hurricanes ===
On 20 Nov 2023 it was reported that he had signed for Midlands Hurricanes in the RFL League 1

On 19 October 2025 it was reported that he was taking some time away from the game after becoming a father
