= Brandon Douglas (rugby league) =

English rugby league footballer

Bran Douglas
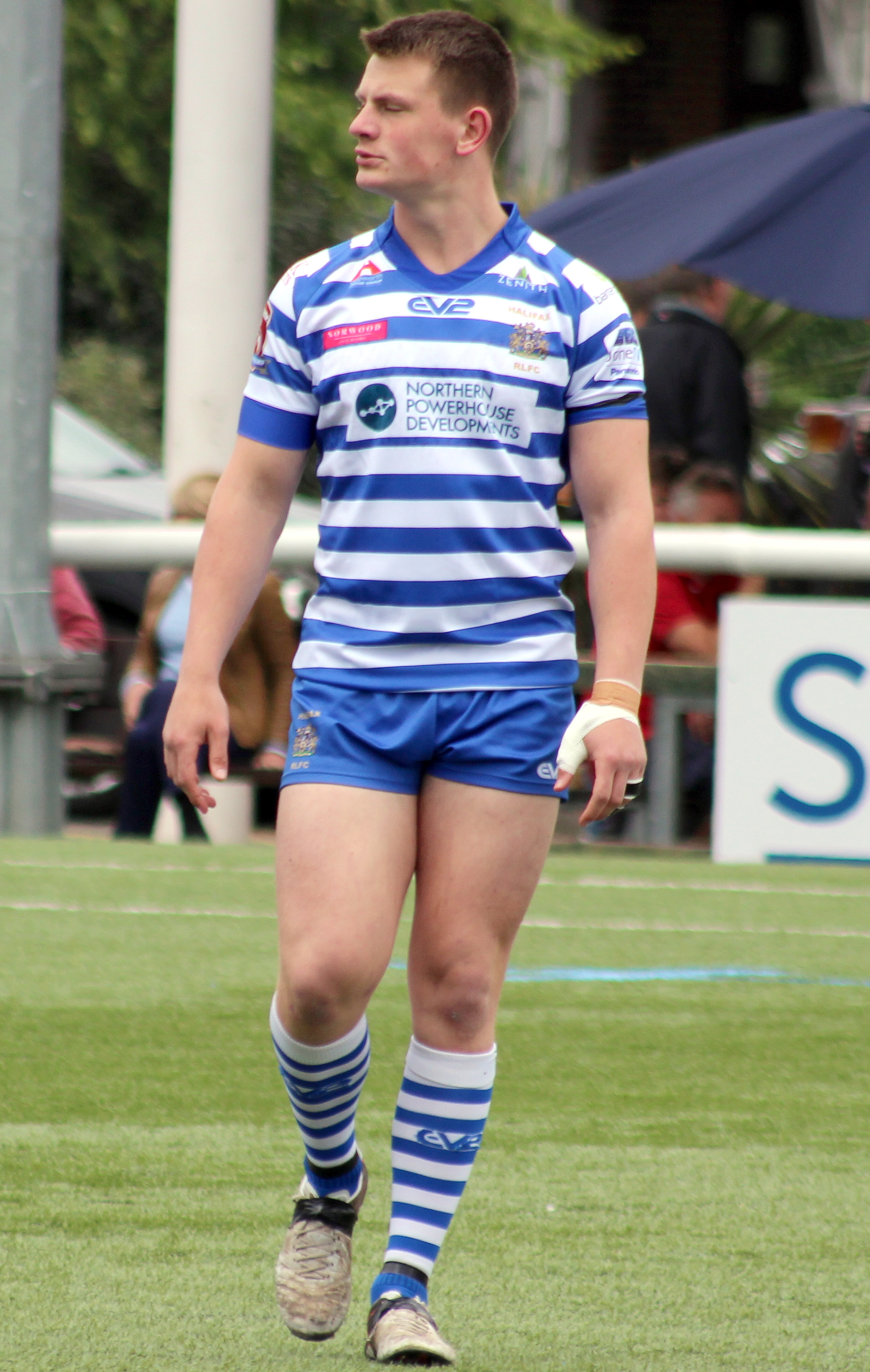

Personal information
- Full name: Brandon Douglas
- Born: 17 August 1997 (age 29) Bradford, West Yorkshire, England
- Height: 6 ft 2 in (1.88 m)
- Weight: 16 st 5 lb (104 kg)

Playing information
- Position: Prop, Second-row
Club
Years	Team	Pld	T	G	FG	P
2016–18	Castleford Tigers	2	0	0	0	0
2017(loan)	→ Dewsbury Rams	10	2	0	0	8
2017(loan)	→ Halifax	10	3	0	0	12
2018(loan)	→ Halifax	11	1	0	0	4
2019–21	Doncaster RLFC	36	12	0	0	48
2022–23	Sheffield Eagles	50	7	0	0	28
2024–25	Halifax Panthers	8	0	0	0	0
2026	Bradford Bulls	6	0	0	0	0
2026(loan)	→ Batley Bulldogs	1	0	0	0	0
2026(loan)	→ Halifax Panthers	1	0	0	0	0
2027–	Halifax Panthers	0	0	0	0	0
	Total	135	25	0	0	100
- Source: As of 16 November 2026

Brandon Douglas (born 17 August 1997) is a professional rugby league footballer who plays as a prop or second-row forward for the Halifax Panthers in the RFL Championship.

== Playing career ==
=== Castleford Tigers ===
He spent the 2018 season on loan from the Castleford Tigers in the Super League at Halifax in the Championship.

=== Sheffield Eagles ===
In November 2021 he joined Sheffield Eagles on a two-year deal.

=== Halifax Panthers ===
On 23 May 2023 it was reported that he had signed for Halifax Panthers in the RFL Championship on a 2-year deal.

=== Bradford Bulls ===
On 31 October 2025 it was reported that he had joined the Bradford Bulls in the Super League on a 2-year deal

On 8 October 2026 it was reported that he had been released by Bradford Bulls by mutual consent

=== Batley Bulldogs (loan) ===
On 1 April 2026 it was reported that he would be joining Batley Bulldogs in the Championship on a week-by-week loan basis.

=== Halifax Panthers (loan) ===
On 8 April 2026 it was reported that he had signed for Halifax Panthers in the RFL Championship on one-month loan

=== Halifax Panthers (re-join) ===
On 14 October 2026 it was reported that he had signed for Halifax Panthers in the RFL Championship
