= Ben Roberts (rugby league) =

NZ & Samoa international rugby league footballer

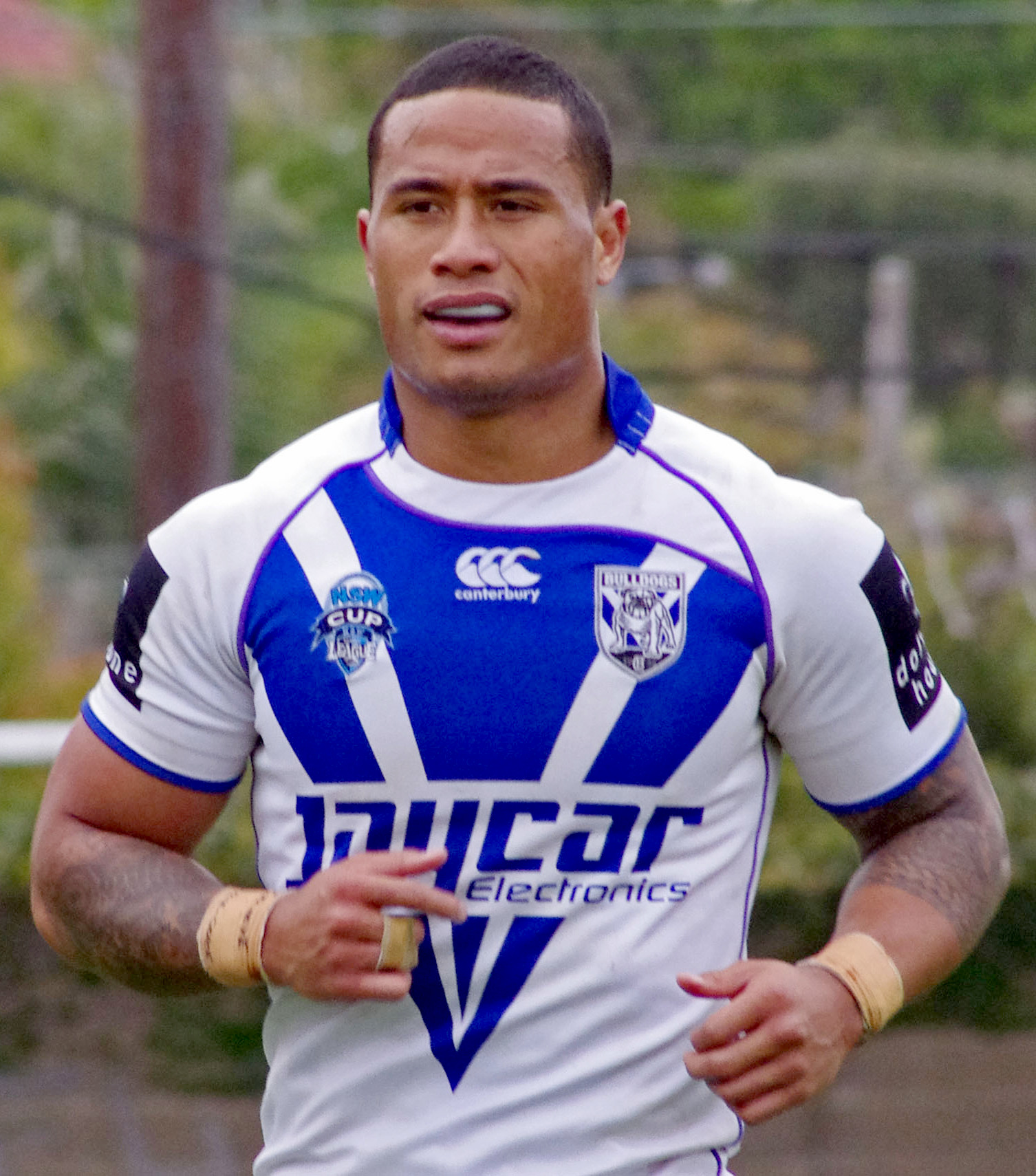

Personal information
- Full name: Benjamin Tapuloa Roberts
- Born: 8 July 1985 (age 41) Westmead, New South Wales, Australia

Playing information
- Height: 183 cm (6 ft 0 in)
- Weight: 94 kg (14 st 11 lb)
- Position: Five-eighth, Halfback, Fullback
Club
Years	Team	Pld	T	G	FG	P
2006–11	Canterbury Bulldogs	93	10	0	1	41
2012–13	Parramatta Eels	37	2	1	0	10
2014	Melbourne Storm	18	2	3	0	14
2015–19	Castleford Tigers	78	22	0	2	90
	Total	226	36	4	3	155
Representative
Years	Team	Pld	T	G	FG	P
2006–07	New Zealand	5	0	3	0	6
2008–17	Samoa	12	4	9	0	34

Benjamin Tapuloa Roberts (born 8 July 1985) is a former professional rugby league footballer who played as a five-eighth, halfback or fullback in the NRL and the Super League in the 2000s and 2010s. He represented New Zealand and Samoa at international level.

He began his NRL career in 2006 with the Canterbury-Bankstown Bulldogs, where he spent six seasons and made over 90 appearances. He also went on to play for the Parramatta Eels and the Melbourne Storm. Roberts made the move to Super League in 2015, joining the Castleford Tigers. After a five-year spell, he departed the Tigers and retired from professional rugby league.

Roberts represented New Zealand in five test matches in 2006 and 2007. He made fifteen appearances for Samoa between 2008 and 2017 and represented the team at three Rugby League World Cups.

== Background ==
Roberts was born in Westmead, New South Wales, Australia. He is of Samoan and New Zealand descent and is the cousin of soccer players Tim Cahill and Chris Cahill.

Roberts was educated at John Therry Catholic High School, Rosemeadow. He then studied at Patrician Brothers' College, Fairfield, alongside former Sharks centre Dean Collis where he represented 2003 Australian Schoolboys.

== Playing career ==
Roberts in action for the Canterbury Bulldogs

Joining the Canterbury-Bankstown Bulldogs in 2006 as a five-eighth, Roberts was originally recruited from Western Suburbs Magpies before became a regular member of the NSWRL Premier League team. In 2007, he has started in halfback in the early rounds due to injury to regular playmaker Brent Sherwin. With Sherwin's return from injury and form, Roberts was shifted to five-eighth.

He made his second international appearance for the New Zealand Kiwis on Friday 20 April at the 2007 ANZAC Test against the Australia national rugby league team in Brisbane. In February 2008, Roberts was arrested by police who were forced to use capsicum spray on the player after an altercation outside the Glasshouse Tavern in Wollongong. He was later fined $2,000 after pleading guilty to assaulting police and resisting arrest.

In the 2008 NRL season, Robert played 21 games for Canterbury as the club finished bottom of the table and claimed the wooden spoon. The season was also a sour one off the field with star player Sonny Bill Williams walking out on the team.

He was named in the New Zealand and Samoan extended training squads for the 2008 Rugby League World Cup. In the end he was selected in the Samoan squad for the tournament.

Five years later he was selected for Samoa in April 2013, for a test match against Tonga in Penrith, New South Wales. Later in the year he was selected for Samoa again, but this time for their 2013 Rugby League World Cup campaign. He featured in all four games that the Samoans played, scoring two tries. He scored one try against heavyweights New Zealand in an entertaining 42–24 defeat. He scored his second try in Samoa's 38–4 thrashing of The Kumuls.

On 17 May 2011 Roberts signed a two-year deal with the Parramatta Eels. Roberts was a member of the Parramatta sides which finished last in 2012 and 2013.

On 23 January 2014, it was announced he had signed on with the Melbourne Storm for the 2014 season. In round 1 of the 2014 NRL season, Roberts made his début for the Storm against the Manly-Warringah Sea Eagles.

On 7 October 2014, Roberts was selected in the Samoan 24 man squad for the 2014 Four Nations series.

=== Super League career ===
On 7 July 2014, it was announced that Roberts signed a contract to play for the Super League club the Castleford Tigers in 2015.

He played his first Super League game against the Catalans Dragons in the second round of the season. He scored his first Super League try against the Warrington Wolves in round 9.

Roberts scored in Castleford's opening home fixture against Wakefield in round 2 of the 2016 season. The following season, Roberts played in the 2017 Super League Grand Final defeat by the Leeds Rhinos at Old Trafford.
