= 2014 Castleford Tigers season =

English rugby league season

Castleford Tigers 2014 season
- Super League XIX Rank: 4th
- Play-off result: Preliminary semi-final
- Challenge Cup: Runners-up
- 2014 record: Wins: 21; draws: 2; losses: 11
- Points scored: For: 814; against: 583

Team information
- Chairman: Jack Fulton
- Head Coach: Daryl Powell
- Captain: Michael Shenton
- Stadium: The Jungle (Wheldon Road)
- Avg. attendance: 7,068
- Agg. attendance: 91,885
- High attendance: 9,867
- Low attendance: 5,104

Top scorers
- Tries: Justin Carney (24)
- Goals: Marc Sneyd (116)
- Points: Marc Sneyd (262)
Home colours	Away colours
← 2013	List of seasons	2015 →

The 2014 season was the Castleford Tigers' 89th season in the Rugby Football League and their 7th consecutive season in the top flight of English rugby league. The club competed in the 2014 Super League and the 2014 Challenge Cup.

== First-team squad ==
2014 Castleford Tigers squad
First team squad			Coaching staff
(England) 1 Jordan Tansey – FB; (England) 2 Kirk Dixon – WG; (England) 3 Michael Shenton (c) – CE; (New Zealand) 4 Jake Webster – CE, SR; (Australia) 5 Justin Carney – WG; (Australia) 6 Luke Dorn – FB; (England) 7 Marc Sneyd – SH; (England) 8 Andy Lynch – PR; (England) 9 Adam Milner – HK; (England) 10 Craig Huby – PR; (Australia) 11 Grant Millington – LF, SR, PR; (New Zealand) 12 Weller Hauraki – SR; (England) 13 Nathan Massey – LF, PR	(England) 14 Daryl Clark – HK; (Ireland) 15 Ryan Boyle – PR; (England) 16 Oliver Holmes – SR; (Scotland) 17 Lee Gilmour – SR; (Scotland) 18 Frankie Mariano – SR; (England) 19 Scott Wheeldon – PR, LF; (England) 20 Jamie Ellis – SO; (England) 21 Ashley Gibson – CE; (England) 22 Richard Owen – WG; (Wales) 23 Michael Channing – CE; (England) 24 James Clare – WG; (Wales) 25 Daniel Fleming – PR; (Ireland) 26 Liam Finn (vc) – SO	(England) 27 Charlie Martin – SR; (England) 28 Ben Reynolds – FB; (Australia) 29 Brett Seymour – SH; (England) 30 Jordan Howden – SO, FB; (England) 31 Brad Day – SR; (England) 32 Lee Jewitt – PR, LF; (England) 33 Will Maher – PR; (England) 35 Garreth Carvell – PR	Head coach: (England) Daryl Powell; Assistant coaches: (England) Danny Orr; (Ireland) Ryan Sheridan; Legend: (c) Captain(s); (vc) Vice-captain(s)

== Transfers and loans ==
=== Transfers in ===
No	Player	From	Contract	Date	Ref.
18	(Scotland) Frankie Mariano	Wakefield Trinity Wildcats	1 year	11 July 2013	
21	(England) Ashley Gibson	Salford City Reds	2 years	28 August 2013	
6	(Australia) Luke Dorn	London Broncos	2 years	10 September 2013	
29	(Australia) Brett Seymour	Hull FC	1 year	11 September 2013	
19	(England) Scott Wheeldon	London Broncos	2 years	12 September 2013	
8	(England) Andy Lynch	Hull FC	2 years	18 September 2013	
23	(Wales) Michael Channing	London Broncos	2 years	20 September 2013	
26	(Ireland) Liam Finn	Featherstone Rovers	1 year	19 December 2013	
32	(England) Lee Jewitt	Limoux Grizzlies	½ year	2 May 2014	
35	(England) Garreth Carvell	Hull FC	½ year	21 July 2014	

=== Loans in ===
No	Player	From	Loan type	Arrival	Return	Ref.
7	(England) Marc Sneyd	Salford Red Devils	Season-long	13 September 2013	26 September 2014	
35	(England) Garreth Carvell	Hull FC	Season-long	18 June 2014	Permanent (Note: The deal was made permanent on 21 July 2014)	

=== Transfers out ===
No	Player	To	Contract	Date	Ref.
6	(England) Rangi Chase	Salford Red Devils	4 years	4 September 2013	
18	(England) Jordan Thompson	Hull FC	3 years	9 September 2013	
25	(Wales) Keith Mason	Retired		9 September 2013	
21	(Ireland) Ben Johnston	Halifax	1 year	27 September 2013	
8	(Scotland) Jonathan Walker	Hull Kingston Rovers	3 years	4 October 2013	
32	(England) Ryan Backhouse	York City Knights	1 year	18 January 2014	
29	(Australia) Brett Seymour	Whitehaven	1 year	6 March 2014	
27	(England) Charlie Martin	Batley Bulldogs	1 year	14 March 2014	

=== Loans out ===
No	Player	To	Loan type	Departure	Return	Ref.
22	(England) Richard Owen	Wakefield Trinity Wildcats	Season-long	15 May 2014	Permanent (Note: The deal was made permanent on 20 October 2014)	
17	(Scotland) Lee Gilmour	Wakefield Trinity Wildcats	Season-long	27 May 2014	Permanent (Note: The deal was made permanent on 4 September 2014)	

=== Dual registration ===
Castleford agreed a dual registration arrangement with the York City Knights in the Championship 1.

Club	No	Player	App	T	G	DG	Pts
York City Knights	31	(England) Brad Day	4	5	0	0	20
York City Knights	25	(Wales) Daniel Fleming	1	0	0	0	0
York City Knights	28	(England) Ben Reynolds	16	7	70	0	168
York City Knights	4	(New Zealand) Jake Webster	1	0	0	0	0

Source: RLRKC – York City Knights 2014

== Pre-season friendlies ==
Date	Opposition	H/A	Venue	Result	Score	Tries	Goals	Drop goals
Thu 26 December (Note: Craig Huby's testimonial match)	Halifax	H	Wheldon Road	D	30–30	Owen (4), Clark, Dixon	Dixon (3)	
Sun 19 January	York City Knights	H	Wheldon Road	W	62–6	Carney (3), Sneyd (2), Owen, Huby, Clare, Clark, Reynolds, Millington	Sneyd (9)	
Sun 26 January	Featherstone Rovers	A	Post Office Road	(P) (Note: Postponed due to a waterlogged pitch)	P–P			
Sun 2 February	Bradford Bulls	A	Odsal Stadium	W	66–10	Dixon (3), Clark (2), Hauraki (2), Dorn, Owen, Shenton, Milner, Mariano	Dixon (9)	
Sat 8 February	Dewsbury Rams	A	Crown Flatt	L	0–18			

== Super League ==
=== Regular season ===
==== Results ====
Date	Round	Opposition	H/A	Venue	Result	Score	Tries	Goals	Drop goals	Attendance
Sun 16 February	1	Bradford Bulls	A	Odsal Stadium	W	36–18	Hauraki, Dixon, Clark, Carney, Dorn, Millington	Dixon (6)		8,214
Sun 23 February	2	Catalans Dragons	H	Wheldon Road	W	32–6	Carney (3), Dixon, Tansey, Clark	Sneyd (4)		5,104
Fri 28 February	3	Hull Kingston Rovers	A	Craven Park	W	30–10	Owen (3), Mariano, Holmes	Sneyd (5)		7,022
Sun 9 March	4	Wigan Warriors	H	Wheldon Road	W	36–31	Dixon, Dorn (2), Milner, Clark, Channing	Sneyd (6)		8,504
Sun 16 March	5	Hull FC	H	Wheldon Road	W	19–16	Shenton, Sneyd, Mariano	Sneyd (3)	Sneyd	9,867
Sun 23 March	6	Salford Red Devils	A	AJ Bell Stadium	L	16–23	Carney, Hauraki, Dorn	Sneyd (2)		5,823
Thu 27 March	7	London Broncos	A	The Hive Stadium	W	54–6	Channing, Holmes, Shenton (2), Finn, Huby, Carney (2), Dorn	Ellis (9)		1,036
Fri 11 April	8	St Helens	H	Wheldon Road	L	28–30	Webster, Shenton (2), Millington, Carney	Sneyd (4)		6,487
Fri 18 April	9	Wakefield Trinity Wildcats	A	Belle Vue	W	43–20	Carney, Clark (2), Owen (2), Wheeldon (2), Finn	Sneyd (5)	Sneyd	5,159
Mon 21 April	10	Warrington Wolves	H	Wheldon Road	W	40–6	Clare (2), Shenton (3), Ellis, Owen	Sneyd (6)		6,853
Sun 4 May	11	Huddersfield Giants	A	Kirklees Stadium	L	28–29	Shenton, Carney, Dixon, Webster, Clark	Sneyd (4)		7,195
Thu 8 May	12	Leeds Rhinos	H	Wheldon Road	L	14–22	Dixon, Sneyd	Sneyd (3)		9,208
Sun 18 May	13	Wakefield Trinity Wildcats	N	City of Manchester Stadium	W	50–12	Clark (2), Carney (2), Tansey, Shenton, Sneyd (2), Mariano	Sneyd (7)		28,213
Sun 25 May	14	Widnes Vikings	H	Wheldon Road	W	34–22	Shenton, Webster, Wheeldon, Dorn (2), Clark	Sneyd (5)		5,576
Sun 1 June	15	Hull Kingston Rovers	H	Wheldon Road	W	54–12	Channing (2), Dorn (3), Millington, Dixon, Ellis, Webster, Huby, Clare	Sneyd (5)		7,196
Fri 13 June	16	Wigan Warriors	A	DW Stadium	L	6–46	Gibson	Ellis		11,914
Sun 22 June	17	St Helens	A	Langtree Park	L	16–38	Dixon, Sneyd, Dorn	Sneyd (2)		12,648
Sat 28 June	18	Salford Red Devils	H	Wheldon Road	W	14–10	Carney, Webster	Sneyd (3)		5,937
Thu 3 July	19	Widnes Vikings	A	Select Security Stadium	W	40–20	Dorn, Holmes, Clark (3), Shenton (2)	Sneyd (6)		4,562
Fri 11 July	20	Huddersfield Giants	H	Wheldon Road	W	44–30	Holmes, Carney, Finn (2), Milner, Dixon, Mariano, Millington	Sneyd (6)		5,310
Thu 17 July	21	Leeds Rhinos	A	Headingley Stadium	D	24–24	Shenton, Hauraki, Massey, Millington	Sneyd (4)		16,173
Thu 24 July	22	Hull FC	A	KC Stadium	D	18–18	Shenton, Sneyd, Clare (2)	Sneyd		9,959
Sun 3 August	23	London Broncos	H	Wheldon Road	W	64–18	Dorn (2), Carney (3), Wheeldon, Shenton, Carvell, Mariano, Dixon (2), Milner	Sneyd (8)		5,233
Fri 15 August	24	Warrington Wolves	A	Halliwell Jones Stadium	L	10–48	Clare, Holmes	Finn		8,391
Sun 31 August	25	Bradford Bulls	H	Wheldon Road	W	32–18	Lynch, Clare, Dorn, Shenton, Clark	Sneyd (6)		7,428
Sun 7 September	26	Wakefield Trinity Wildcats	H	Wheldon Road	W	26–22	Dorn, Clare (2), Dixon, Webster	Sneyd (3)		9,182
Sat 13 September	27	Catalans Dragons	A	Stade Gilbert Brutus	L	6–28	Dixon	Sneyd		9,223

Sources: RLRKC – Castleford Tigers 2014 &

==== League table ====
Super League XIX
Pos	Team	Pld	W	D	L	PF	PA	PD	Pts	Qualification
1	St Helens (L, C)	27	19	0	8	796	563	+233	38	Play-offs
2	Wigan Warriors	27	18	1	8	834	429	+405	37	Play-offs
3	Huddersfield Giants	27	17	3	7	785	626	+159	37	Play-offs
4	Castleford Tigers	27	17	2	8	814	583	+231	36	Play-offs
5	Warrington Wolves	27	17	1	9	793	515	+278	35	Play-offs
6	Leeds Rhinos	27	15	2	10	685	421	+264	32	Play-offs
7	Catalans Dragons	27	14	1	12	733	667	+66	29	Play-offs
8	Widnes Vikings	27	13	1	13	611	725	−114	27	Play-offs
9	Hull Kingston Rovers	27	10	3	14	627	665	−38	23	
10	Salford Red Devils	27	11	1	15	608	695	−87	23	
11	Hull F.C.	27	10	2	15	653	586	+67	22	
12	Wakefield Trinity Wildcats	27	10	1	16	557	750	−193	21	
13	Bradford Bulls (R)	27	8	0	19	512	984	−472	10 (Note: Bradford Bulls deducted 6 points on 25 February 2014 for entering administration)	Relegation to Championship
14	London Broncos (R)	27	1	0	26	438	1237	−799	2	Relegation to Championship

(C) Champions; (L) League Leaders' Shield Winners; (R) Relegated

=== Playoffs ===
Date	Round	Opposition	H/A	Venue	Result	Score	Tries	Goals	Drop goals	Attendance	Source
Fri 19 September	Qualifying play-off	St Helens	A	Langtree Park	L	0–41				7,548	
Thu 25 September	Preliminary semi-final	Warrington Wolves	H	Wheldon Road	L	14–30	Ellis, Dorn, Shenton	Sneyd		6,219	

== Challenge Cup ==
=== Results ===
Date	Round	Opposition	H/A	Venue	Result	Score	Tries	Goals	Drop goals	Attendance
Sun 6 April	Round 4	Batley Bulldogs	A	Mount Pleasant	W	48–10	Dorn (2), Carney (3), Ellis, Sneyd, Clare, Wheeldon	Sneyd (6)		2,482
Sun 27 April	Round 5	Sheffield Eagles	H	Wheldon Road	W	60–16	Carney (4), Millington, Gibson, Dixon, Ellis (2), Clark, Tansey, Holmes	Dixon (2), Sneyd (4)		4,648
Sat 7 June	Quarter-final	Wigan Warriors	A	DW Stadium	W	16–4	Clare, Dixon, Jewitt	Sneyd (2)		8,736
Sun 10 August	Semi-final	Widnes Vikings	N	Leigh Sports Village	W	28–6	Finn, Clark, Dixon, Ellis, Webster	Sneyd (4)		12,005
Sat 23 August	Final	Leeds Rhinos	N	Wembley Stadium	L	10–23	Clark, Holmes	Finn		77,914

Sources: RLRKC – Castleford Tigers 2014 &

== Player statistics ==
=== Summary ===
No	Player	App	T	G	DG	Pts
1	(England) Jordan Tansey	7	3	0	0	12
2	(England) Kirk Dixon	25	15	8	0	76
3	(England) Michael Shenton	32	18	0	0	72
4	(New Zealand) Jake Webster	22	7	0	0	28
5	(Australia) Justin Carney	24	24	0	0	96
6	(Australia) Luke Dorn	24	19	0	0	76
7	(England) Marc Sneyd	31	7	116	2	262
8	(England) Andy Lynch	31	1	0	0	4
9	(England) Adam Milner	25	3	0	0	12
10	(England) Craig Huby	29	2	0	0	8
11	(Australia) Grant Millington	27	6	0	0	24
12	(New Zealand) Weller Hauraki	30	3	0	0	12
13	(England) Nathan Massey	23	1	0	0	4
14	(England) Daryl Clark	30	16	0	0	64
15	(Ireland) Ryan Boyle	3	0	0	0	0
16	(England) Oliver Holmes	32	7	0	0	28
17	(Scotland) Lee Gilmour	0	0	0	0	0
18	(Scotland) Frankie Mariano	30	5	0	0	20
19	(England) Scott Wheeldon	27	5	0	0	20
20	(England) Jamie Ellis	21	7	10	0	48
21	(England) Ashley Gibson	7	2	0	0	8
22	(England) Richard Owen	5	6	0	0	24
23	(Wales) Michael Channing	16	4	0	0	16
24	(England) James Clare	17	11	0	0	44
25	(Wales) Daniel Fleming	5	0	0	0	0
26	(Ireland) Liam Finn	29	5	2	0	24
27	(England) Charlie Martin	0	0	0	0	0
28	(England) Ben Reynolds	2	0	0	0	0
29	(Australia) Brett Seymour	0	0	0	0	0
30	(England) Jordan Howden	0	0	0	0	0
31	(England) Brad Day	1	0	0	0	0
32	(England) Lee Jewitt	16	1	0	0	4
33	(England) Will Maher	1	0	0	0	0
35	(England) Garreth Carvell	6	1	0	0	4

Source: RLRKC – Castleford Tigers 2014
