= 2013 Castleford Tigers season =

English rugby league season

Castleford Tigers 2013 season
- Super League Rank: 12th
- Play-off result: Did not qualify
- Challenge Cup: Fourth round
- 2013 record: Wins: 9; draws: 2; losses: 17
- Points scored: For: 714; against: 909

Team information
- Chairman: Jack Fulton
- Head Coach: Ian Millward (sacked 9 April); Danny Orr (caretaker); Daryl Powell
- Captain: Michael Shenton
- Stadium: The Jungle (Wheldon Road)
- Avg. attendance: 6,306
- Agg. attendance: 81,979
- High attendance: 9,103
- Low attendance: 3,222

Top scorers
- Tries: Justin Carney (21)
- Goals: Jamie Ellis (59)
- Points: Jamie Ellis (147)
← 2012	List of seasons	2014 →

The 2013 season was the Castleford Tigers' 88th season in the Rugby Football League and their 6th consecutive season in the top flight of English rugby league. The club competed in the 2013 Super League and the 2013 Challenge Cup.

Castleford began the season under head coach Ian Millward, before he was dismissed in April. After assistant Danny Orr took charge as caretaker, Daryl Powell was appointed head coach in May. The team was captained by Michael Shenton. They finished the Super League season in 12th place.

== First-team squad ==
2013 Castleford Tigers squad
First team squad			Coaching staff
(England) 1 Richard Owen – WG, FB; (Australia) 2 Justin Carney – WG; (England) 3 Michael Shenton (c) – CE; (New Zealand) 4 Jake Webster – CE; (England) 5 Kirk Dixon – WG; (England) 6 Rangi Chase (vc) – SO; (England) 7 Jamie Ellis – SH; (Scotland) 8 Jonathan Walker – PR; (England) 9 Daryl Clark – HK; (England) 10 Craig Huby – PR; (Scotland) 11 Lee Gilmour – SR; (New Zealand) 12 Weller Hauraki – SR, SO; (Australia) 13 Grant Millington – LF, SR, PR	(Wales) 14 Jake Emmitt – PR; (England) 15 Adam Milner – HK; (England) 16 Nathan Massey – LF, PR; (England) 17 Oliver Holmes – SR, LF; (England) 18 Jordan Thompson – CE, SR; (England) 19 Jordan Tansey – FB; (England) 20 Steve Nash – PR; (Ireland) 21 Ben Johnston – SH; (Wales) 22 Daniel Fleming – PR; (England) 23 James Clare – WG; (England) 24 Charlie Martin – SR; (Wales) 25 Keith Mason – PR; (England) 26 Gareth O'Brien – SO	(Ireland) 27 Ryan Boyle – PR; (Ireland) 28 Tyrone McCarthy – SR; (England) 29 Ben Davies – PR; (Wales) 30 Michael Channing – CE; (England) 31 Ben Reynolds – FB; (England) 32 Ryan Backhouse – SR	Head coach: (Australia) Ian Millward (sacked 9 April); (England) Danny Orr (caretaker); (England) Daryl Powell; Assistant coaches: (England) Stuart Donlan; (England) Danny Orr; (Ireland) Ryan Sheridan; Legend: (c) Captain(s); (vc) Vice-captain(s)

== Transfers and loans ==
=== Transfers in ===
No	Player	From	Contract	Date	Ref.
3	(England) Michael Shenton	St Helens	4 years	7 June 2012	
4	(New Zealand) Jake Webster	Hull Kingston Rovers	3 years	26 June 2012	
11	(Scotland) Lee Gilmour	Huddersfield Giants	2 years	28 June 2012	
19	(England) Jordan Tansey	York City Knights	1 year	5 July 2012	
2	(Australia) Justin Carney	Sydney Roosters	2 years	9 August 2012	
12	(New Zealand) Weller Hauraki	Leeds Rhinos	2 years	13 September 2012	
25	(Wales) Keith Mason	Huddersfield Giants	1 year	12 December 2012	
27	(Ireland) Ryan Boyle	Salford City Reds	1½ years	4 April 2013	
29	(England) Ben Davies	Widnes Vikings	½ year	13 June 2013	

=== Loans in ===
No	Player	From	Loan type	Arrival	Return	Ref.
26	(England) Gareth O'Brien	Warrington Wolves	One-month	14 February 2013	13 March 2013	
28	(Ireland) Tyrone McCarthy	Warrington Wolves	One-month	29 April 2013	23 May 2013	
30	(Wales) Michael Channing	London Broncos	Season-long	6 July 2013	Permanent (Note: The deal was made permanent on 20 September 2013)	

=== Transfers out ===
No	Player	To	Contract	Date	Ref.
3	(England) Joe Arundel	Hull FC	4 years	29 May 2012	
2	(Australia) Nick Youngquest	Retired		26 June 2012	
16	(England) Ryan Hudson	Retired		18 July 2012	
27	(England) John Davies	Batley Bulldogs	2 years	21 July 2012	
7	(England) Danny Orr	Retired		26 July 2012	
14	(England) Stuart Jones	Retired		2 August 2012	
5	(England) Josh Griffin	Released (Note: Griffin crossed codes to rugby union and joined Leeds Carnegie)		29 August 2012	
13	(England) Steve Snitch	Northern Pride	1 year	31 August 2012	
29	(England) Josh Atkinson	Released		9 September 2012	
—	(Scotland) Ryan Brierley	Leigh Centurions	1 year (Note: Initially joined on loan during the 2012 season, with the deal being made permanent ahead of 2013)	9 September 2012	
31	(England) Ben Blackmore	Huddersfield Giants	1 year	22 September 2012	
19	(Scotland) Paul Jackson	Whitehaven	2 years	25 September 2012	
—	(England) Richie Mathers	Wakefield Trinity Wildcats	2 years	23 October 2012	
14	(Wales) Jake Emmitt	Salford Red Devils	1½ years	4 April 2013	
20	(England) Steve Nash	Dewsbury Rams	½ year	26 July 2013	
29	(England) Ben Davies	Halifax	½ year	26 July 2013	

=== Loans out ===
No	Player	To	Loan type	Departure	Return	Ref.
21	(Ireland) Ben Johnston	Dewsbury Rams	Season-long, one-month recall	25 October 2012	21 April 2013	
23	(England) James Clare	Doncaster	Season-long, one-month recall	25 October 2012	4 March 2013	
20	(England) Steve Nash	Dewsbury Rams	Season-long	1 February 2013	Permanent (Note: The deal was made permanent on 26 July 2013)	
21	(Ireland) Ben Johnston	York City Knights	Season-long	9 May 2013	2 September 2013	

=== Dual registration ===
Under the newly-introduced dual registration system, Castleford agreed a partnership with Keighley Cougars in the Championship. Additionally, Dan Fleming featured for Batley Bulldogs on an individual dual registration deal.

Club	No	Player	App	T	G	DG	Pts
Keighley Cougars	1	(England) Richard Owen	1	0	0	0	0
Keighley Cougars	8	(Scotland) Jonathan Walker	2	0	0	0	0
Keighley Cougars	14	(Wales) Jake Emmitt	3	0	0	0	0
Keighley Cougars	24	(England) Charlie Martin	6	0	0	0	0
Batley Bulldogs	22	(Wales) Daniel Fleming	11	3	0	0	12

Sources: RLRKC – Keighley Cougars 2013 & RLRKC – Batley Bulldogs 2013

== Pre-season friendlies ==
Date	Opposition	H/A	Venue	Result	Score	Tries	Goals	Drop goals	Attendance
Sun 13 January (Note: Kirk Yeaman's testimonial match)	Hull FC	A	KC Stadium	L	6–26	Webster	Dixon		5,577
Sun 20 January	Featherstone Rovers	H	Wheldon Road	W	20–10	Carney (2), Webster, Dixon	Dixon (2)		2,388

== Super League ==
=== Results ===
Date	Round	Opposition	H/A	Venue	Result	Score	Tries	Goals	Drop goals	Attendance
Sun 3 February	1	Warrington Wolves	A	Halliwell Jones Stadium	L	24–40	Carney, Shenton, Owen, Webster	Ellis (4)		10,721
Sun 10 February	2	Leeds Rhinos	H	Wheldon Road	W	14–12	Tansey, Webster	Ellis (3)		9,103
Sat 16 February	3	Bradford Bulls	A	Odsal Stadium	L	12–38	Ellis, Dixon	Ellis (2)		7,724
Sun 24 February	4	Catalans Dragons	H	Wheldon Road	D	17–17	Thompson, Shenton, Dixon	Ellis (2)	O'Brien	5,205
Sun 3 March	5	Wigan Warriors	H	Wheldon Road	L	22–28	Webster, Ellis, Carney (2)	Ellis (3)		7,852
Fri 8 March	6	Hull FC	A	KC Stadium	L	0–52				11,852
Sun 17 March	7	London Broncos	H	Wheldon Road	L	12–26	Dixon, Huby	Ellis (2)		4,751
Sun 24 March	8	Hull Kingston Rovers	A	Craven Park	L	22–26	Dixon, Webster, Owen, Clark	Dixon (3)		6,489
Fri 29 March (Note: The match was abandoned with 7 minutes remaining due to a floodlight issue, though it was agreed the result would stand.)	9	Wakefield Trinity Wildcats	H	Wheldon Road	L	16–37	Thompson (2), Owen	Ellis (2)		7,705
Mon 1 April	10	St Helens	A	Langtree Park	L	18–48	Clark, Carney, Clare	Ellis (3)		10,943
Sat 6 April (Note: Ian Millward's final match as head coach)	11	Huddersfield Giants	H	Wheldon Road	L	24–40	Holmes, Milner, Clark, Walker	Ellis (4)		3,222
Sat 13 April (Note: Danny Orr's first match as interim head coach)	12	Widnes Vikings	H	Wheldon Road	W	28–26	Clare, Owen (2), Thompson, Milner	Ellis (4)		3,986
Sat 27 April (Note: Salford were later deducted 2 competition points for having 14 players on the pitch during the closing minutes.)	13	Salford Red Devils	A	AJ Bell Stadium	L	30–34	Massey, Carney, Milner, Holmes, Ellis, Thompson	Ellis (3)		2,306
Sun 5 May	14	Hull Kingston Rovers	H	Wheldon Road	W	32–24	Boyle, Carney (2), Shenton, Walker, Tansey	Ellis (4)		6,474
Sat 18 May (Note: Daryl Powell's first match as head coach)	15	Catalans Dragons	A	Stade Gilbert Brutus	L	30–39	Thompson (2), Carney (2), Clark	Ellis (5)		7,083
Sat 25 May	16	Wakefield Trinity Wildcats	N	Etihad Stadium	W	49–24	Clark, Ellis, Dixon (4), Huby, Carney, Thompson	Ellis (6)	Ellis	31,249
Sat 1 June	17	London Broncos	A	Twickenham Stoop	D	30–30	Clark, Chase, Millington, Carney, Massey	Ellis (5)		1,810
Fri 7 June	18	Leeds Rhinos	A	Headingley Stadium	L	24–42	Hauraki, Tansey (2), Huby	Ellis (4)		17,035
Fri 21 June	19	Hull FC	H	Wheldon Road	W	30–28	Owen, Chase, Clark, Walker, Clare	Dixon (5)		6,022
Fri 28 June	20	Wigan Warriors	A	DW Stadium	W	18–4	Dixon, Millington, Clare	Dixon (3)		12,463
Sun 7 July	21	St Helens	H	Wheldon Road	L	24–40	Owen, Tansey, Hauraki, Carney, Chase	Dixon (2)		8,229
Sun 21 July	22	Huddersfield Giants	A	Kirklees Stadium	L	32–48	Shenton, Carney (2), Clark, Chase, Hauraki	Dixon (4)		5,733
Sun 4 August	23	Warrington Wolves	H	Wheldon Road	L	30–40	Carney, Hauraki, Milner, Dixon, Huby	Dixon (5)		5,980
Sun 11 August	24	Widnes Vikings	A	Select Security Stadium	W	42–38	Carney (2), Boyle, Massey, Ellis, Milner, Hauraki, Channing	Dixon (5)		5,155
Sun 18 August	25	Bradford Bulls	H	Wheldon Road	W	46–34	Dixon, Milner (2), Carney, Chase, Tansey, Massey, Ellis	Dixon (7)		6,633
Sun 1 September	26	Salford Red Devils	H	Wheldon Road	W	44–30	Channing (2), Shenton, Carney (3), Fleming, Chase, Thompson	Dixon (3), Ellis		6,817
Sun 8 September	27	Wakefield Trinity Wildcats	A	Belle Vue	L	32–36	Clare (4), Chase, Hauraki	Dixon (4)		6,404

Sources: RLRKC – Castleford Tigers 2013 &

=== League table ===
Super League XVIII
Pos	Team	Pld	W	D	L	PF	PA	PD	Pts	Qualification
1	Huddersfield Giants (L)	27	21	0	6	851	507	+344	42	Play-offs
2	Warrington Wolves	27	20	1	6	836	461	+375	41	Play-offs
3	Leeds Rhinos	27	18	1	8	712	507	+205	37	Play-offs
4	Wigan Warriors (C)	27	17	1	9	816	460	+356	35	Play-offs
5	St. Helens	27	15	1	11	678	536	+142	31	Play-offs
6	Hull F.C.	27	13	2	12	652	563	+89	28	Play-offs
7	Catalans Dragons	27	13	2	12	619	604	+15	28	Play-offs
8	Hull Kingston Rovers	27	13	0	14	642	760	−118	26	Play-offs
9	Bradford Bulls	27	10	2	15	640	658	−18	22	
10	Widnes Vikings	27	10	2	15	695	841	−146	22	
11	Wakefield Trinity Wildcats	27	10	1	16	660	749	−89	21	
12	Castleford Tigers	27	9	2	16	702	881	−179	20	
13	London Broncos	27	5	2	20	487	946	−459	12	
14	Salford City Reds	27	6	1	20	436	953	−517	11 (Note: Salford deducted 2 points on 14 June 2013 for fielding 14 players during home game against Castleford)	

Source: superleague.co.uk and BBC Sport
Rules for classification: 1st on competition points; 2nd on match points difference. Competition points: for win = 2; for draw = 1; for loss = 0.
(C) Champions; (L) League Leaders' Shield Winners

== Challenge Cup ==
=== Results ===
Date	Round	Opposition	H/A	Venue	Result	Score	Tries	Goals	Drop goals	Attendance
Fri 19 April	Round 4	Leeds Rhinos	A	Headingley Stadium	L	12–28	Chase, Ellis	Ellis (2)		8,130

Sources: RLRKC – Castleford Tigers 2013 &

== Player statistics ==
=== Summary ===
Appearances and points in all competitions
No	Player	App	T	G	DG	Pts
1	(England) Richard Owen	14	7	0	0	0
2	(Australia) Justin Carney	20	21	0	0	0
3	(England) Michael Shenton	27	5	0	0	0
4	(New Zealand) Jake Webster	7	4	0	0	0
5	(England) Kirk Dixon	21	11	41	0	0
6	(England) Rangi Chase	26	8	0	0	0
7	(England) Jamie Ellis	24	7	59	1	0
8	(Scotland) Jonathan Walker	20	3	0	0	0
9	(England) Daryl Clark	28	8	0	0	0
10	(England) Craig Huby	28	4	0	0	0
11	(Scotland) Lee Gilmour	13	0	0	0	0
12	(New Zealand) Weller Hauraki	26	6	0	0	0
13	(Australia) Grant Millington	21	2	0	0	0
14	(Wales) Jake Emmitt	5	0	0	0	0
15	(England) Adam Milner	23	7	0	0	0
16	(England) Nathan Massey	28	4	0	0	0
17	(England) Oliver Holmes	23	2	0	0	0
18	(England) Jordan Thompson	25	9	0	0	0
19	(England) Jordan Tansey	27	6	0	0	0
20	(England) Steve Nash	0	0	0	0	0
21	(Ireland) Ben Johnston	0	0	0	0	0
22	(Wales) Daniel Fleming	11	1	0	0	0
23	(England) James Clare	9	8	0	0	0
24	(England) Charlie Martin	6	0	0	0	0
25	(Wales) Keith Mason	16	0	0	0	0
26	(England) Gareth O'Brien	2	0	0	1	1
27	(Ireland) Ryan Boyle	17	2	0	0	0
28	(Ireland) Tyrone McCarthy	0	0	0	0	0
29	(England) Ben Davies	2	0	0	0	0
30	(Wales) Michael Channing	4	3	0	0	0
31	(England) Ben Reynolds	2	0	0	0	0
32	(England) Ryan Backhouse	0	0	0	0	0

Source: RLRKC – Castleford Tigers 2013
