= James Clare (rugby league) =

English rugby league footballer (born 1991)

James "Sticks" Clare
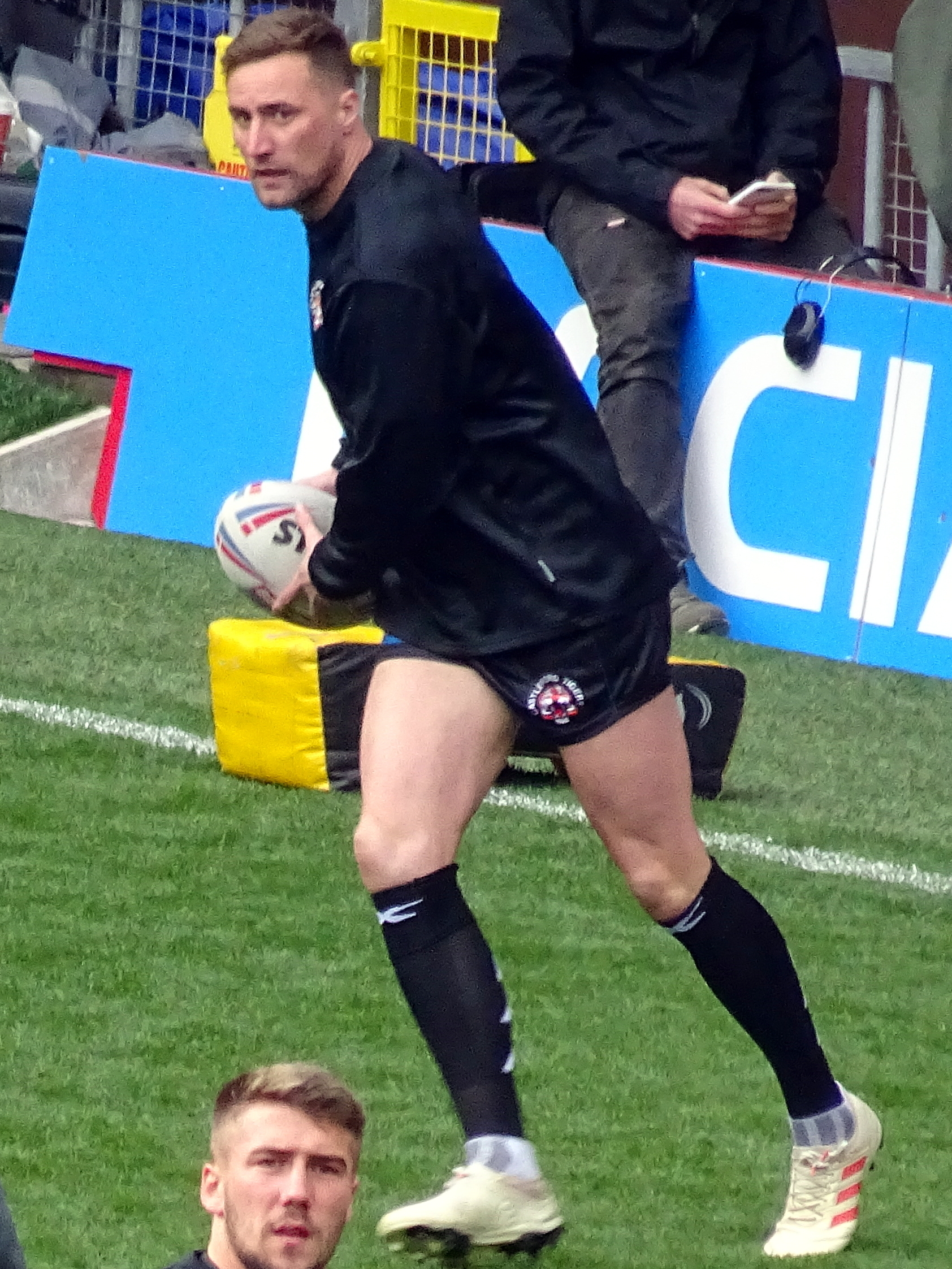

Personal information
- Full name: James David Clare
- Born: 13 April 1991 (age 35) Castleford, West Yorkshire, England

Playing information
- Height: 6 ft 2 in (1.88 m)
- Weight: 14 st 2 lb (90 kg)
- Position: Wing, Fullback
Club
Years	Team	Pld	T	G	FG	P
2012–15	Castleford Tigers	38	24	0	0	96
2013(loan)	→ Doncaster	4	1	0	0	4
2015(DR)	→ York City Knights	7	9	0	0	36
2015–16	Bradford Bulls	30	21	0	0	84
2017	Leigh Centurions	5	6	0	0	24
2018–22	Castleford Tigers	70	30	0	0	120
2018(DR)	→ Halifax	3	0	0	0	0
2022(loan)	→ York City Knights	1	0	0	0	0
	Total	158	91	0	0	364

James Clare (born 13 April 1991) is an English former professional rugby league footballer who played as a winger or fullback in the Super League and the RFL Championship in the 2010s and 2020s.

Clare spent the majority of his career with the Castleford Tigers in the Super League across two spells, making over 100 appearances and scoring over 50 tries. He played two seasons for the Bradford Bulls in the Championship, and also represented the Leigh Centurions in the Super League. He spent time on loan or dual registration with Doncaster, Halifax and the York City Knights in the Championship, and at the York City Knights in League 1.

== Background ==
Clare was born in Castleford, West Yorkshire, England.

Having come through the Castleford Tigers academy system, Clare earned his first full-time contract prior to the 2012 season.

== Playing career ==
=== Castleford Tigers ===
Clare made his first team début for the Castleford Tigers on 16 March 2012 away to the Huddersfield Giants. He made 2 further appearances that season, and scored his first try on 8 July 2012 at home to Huddersfield.

In June 2013, Clare signed a two-year contract extension with the Tigers. On 8 September 2013, Clare scored 4 tries in Castleford's visit to local rivals Wakefield Trinity Wildcats on the final day of the season. In 2013, he made 9 appearances and scored 8 tries.

Clare was allocated squad number 24 prior to the 2014 season. He made 17 appearances and scored 11 tries for Castleford as the team finished 4th in Super League and reached the Challenge Cup final.

Clare was given squad number 2 for 2015, following the retirement of Kirk Dixon, after his impressive performances in 2014 established him in the first team. Despite this, Clare said, "The hard work starts now in my eyes. The number will mean nothing if you don't train as hard as you can or perform on the day". He made 9 appearances and scored 4 tries for the Tigers, as well as playing for the York City Knights on dual registration, before his move to the Bradford Bulls was announced on 22 July.

==== Doncaster (loan) ====
Clare joined newly-promoted Championship side Doncaster for the 2013 season. He was to be on a 24 hour call back for parent club Castleford after 28 days. Clare made 4 appearances and scored 1 try for the club across February and March before returning to the Tigers.

==== York City Knights (dual registration) ====
In 2015, Clare played for the York City Knights in League 1 through their dual registration arrangement with Castleford. The Tigers' head coach Daryl Powell said he was "looking for him to build some confidence" through spending time at York. Clare made 7 appearances and scored 9 tries for the Knights.

=== Bradford Bulls ===
Clare signed for Championship side the Bradford Bulls in July, towards the end of the 2015 season. He signed a deal until the end of the 2016 season.

In the 2015 Season, Clare featured in Round 23 (Halifax). Clare played in Qualifier 1 (Sheffield Eagles) to Qualifier 4 (Widnes Vikings) then in Qualifier 6 (Leigh Centurions) to Qualifier 7 (Halifax). He scored against the Sheffield Eagles (1 try), the Wakefield Trinity Wildcats (1 try) and Salford Red Devils (1 try).

In the 2016 Season, Clare featured in the pre-season friendlies against the Leeds Rhinos and the Castleford Tigers. He scored against Castleford Tigers (1 try). He featured in Round 1 (Featherstone Rovers) to Round 22 (Oldham). Clare played in the Challenge Cup in the 4th Round (Dewsbury Rams). He scored against Whitehaven (2 tries), the Swinton Lions (3 tries), the Leigh Centurions (3 tries), the London Broncos (1 try), Halifax (1 try), the Sheffield Eagles (1 try), the Dewsbury Rams (1 try), Workington Town (2 tries), Oldham (2 tries) and the Batley Bulldogs (2 tries). In June, midway through the season, Clare signed a contract extension keeping him at Bradford until 2018.

Clare later recalled that, after Bradford were placed in administration in November 2016, he "seriously considered quitting the game for good", saying, "The amount of emotional stress you go through takes its toll on you physically in the end." In January 2017, following the Bradford Bulls' liquidation, Clare became a free agent.

=== Leigh Centurions ===
In January 2017, Clare signed a 2-year deal with the newly-promoted Leigh Centurions. Leigh head coach Neil Jukes said: "James is someone we've admired and monitored for some while now, especially after his performance in our epic draw at Bradford last year." He was allocated shirt number 28, due to arriving after the squad numbers had been revealed.

Clare suffered an anterior cruciate ligament injury in Leigh's pre-season win over the Dewsbury Rams on 29 January 2017. This ruled him out for most of the upcoming season. He made his first appearance for the Centurions on 3 September against the Widnes Vikings in the fourth round of the Qualifiers, scoring a try. He played the remainder of the season, making 5 appearances and scoring 6 tries. Leigh were defeated by the Catalans Dragons in the 2017 Million Pound Game, resulting in their relegation to the Championship and rendering all contracts null and void, leaving other clubs free to approach Clare.

=== Castleford Tigers ===
In December 2017, Clare rejoined his hometown club Castleford Tigers on a one-year deal for the 2018 season, with an option to extend the deal by a further year. He said, "Cas are the club that I've supported for my entire life so to be back here and to have another chance to pull on this famous shirt is great," and added, "I pushed for the move as much as I could because I knew I always wanted to come back here."

In his first season back at Castleford, Clare wore the number 26. After beginning the season at Halifax on dual registration, he played his first game since returning against the Salford Red Devils on 11 March, scoring a try. He was kept out for a number of months mid-season due to a tibial plateau fracture. In July, he extended his contract until the end of the 2020 season. Despite his injury – and the fierce competition for places on Castleford's wings from Greg Eden, Greg Minikin and Jy Hitchcox – he made 18 appearances and scored 8 tries.

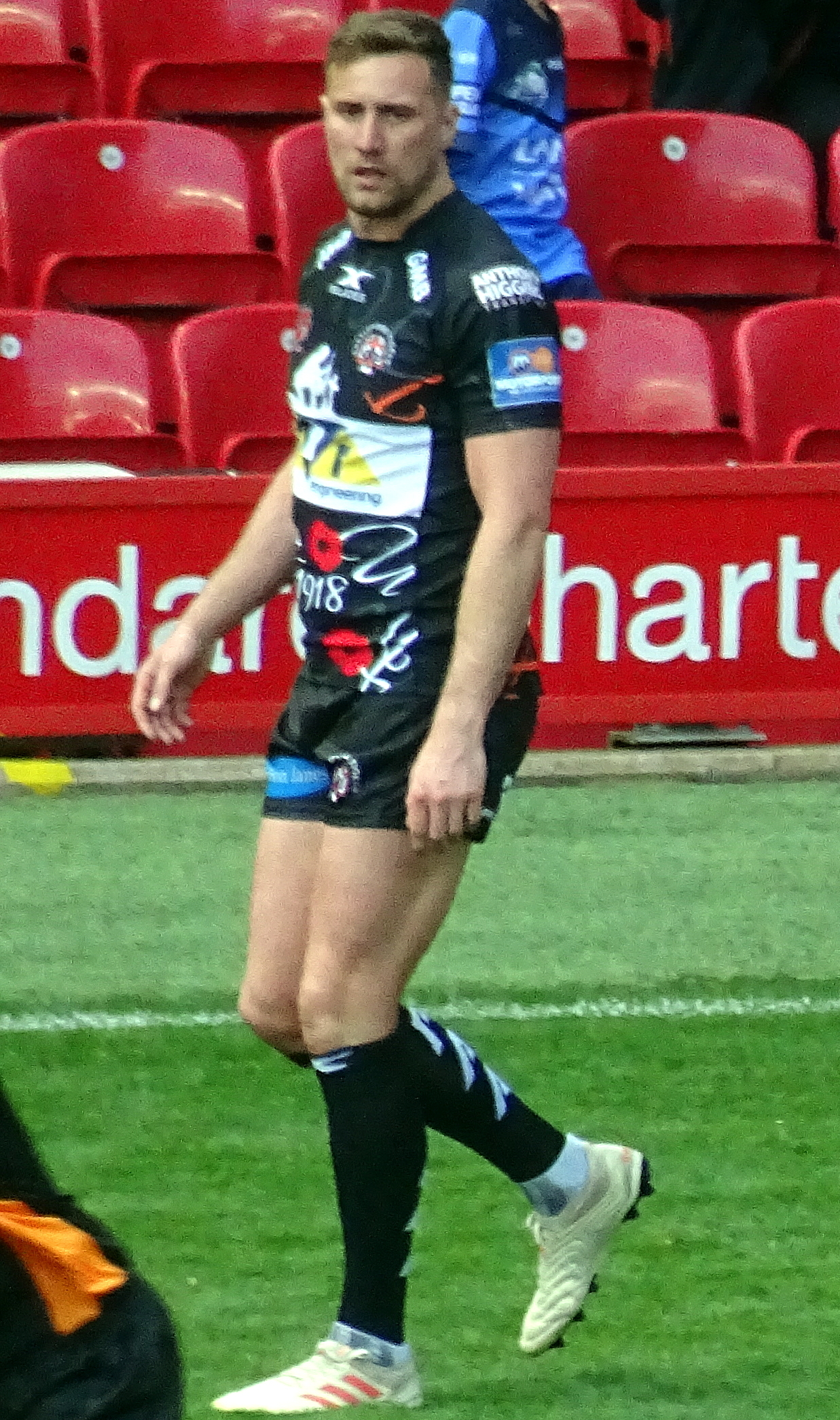
Clare warming up for the Castleford Tigers at Anfield in 2019

The 2019 campaign proved to be Clare's most prolific season yet in the Super League. He regained squad number 2, claiming the right-wing berth as his own following Greg Minikin's move to centre. He made 30 appearances, playing in all but 2 of Castleford's matches, and scored 16 tries, topping the club's try-scoring charts. This included his second hat-trick for the Tigers on 12 July – this was his first Castleford treble since 2013 and it occurred, again, in a visit to local rivals Wakefield. In recognition of his form, Clare also finished the season as runner-up for the club's Players' Player of the Year award.

Following the arrival of Sosaia Feki and Derrell Olpherts at Castleford for 2020, Clare was given squad number 21. He made a strong start to the campaign and had made 5 appearances and scored 4 tries when the season was suspended in March. Upon the season's resumption, injuries to teammates saw Clare fill in at fullback and centre. In December 2020, it was announced that Clare had signed a two-year extension with Castleford, with head coach Daryl Powell touting him as the team's "most improved player" and praising his hard work and commitment.

Prior to the 2021 season, Clare was forced to undergo knee surgery due to an injury sustained during the previous campaign. This caused him to miss the start of the year, and he was limited to 7 appearances throughout the season. First-team opportunities proved harder to come by for Clare in 2022 under Lee Radford, making 3 appearances, though he was a part of the coaching staff for the club's academy. On 26 August 2022, Castleford confirmed that Clare would leave the club at the end of the season upon the expiry of his contract. Across both stints with Castleford, Clare made 108 appearances and scored 54 tries.

==== Halifax (dual registration) ====
In February 2018, Clare played for Championship side Halifax through their dual registration agreement with Castleford. He made 3 appearances.

==== York City Knights (loan) ====
In February 2022, Clare joined Championship team York on a one-month loan deal. However, he only made one appearance for the Knights after receiving a three-match ban for punching in a pre-season friendly for Castleford.

== Retirement ==
Clare retired from professional rugby league following the conclusion of the 2022 season. He had been offered a new contract by Castleford alongside a foundation coaching role but instead opted to focus on his own coaching business, the Elite Rugby Academy, for children aged 4 to 14. He began work in secondary education in late 2022 as a PLC co-ordinator in a Pontefract school. He has proved popular with all the students and continues to promote rugby league in school. He has moved on and continued to work in education across Castleford.

== Statistics ==
Appearances and points in all competitions by year
Club	Season	Tier	App	T	G	DG	Pts
Castleford Tigers	2012	Super League	3	1	0	0	4
Castleford Tigers	2013	Super League	9	8	0	0	32
Castleford Tigers	2014	Super League	17	11	0	0	44
Castleford Tigers	2015	Super League	9	4	0	0	16
Castleford Tigers	2018	Super League	18	8	0	0	32
Castleford Tigers	2019	Super League	30	16	0	0	64
Castleford Tigers	2020	Super League	12	4	0	0	16
Castleford Tigers	2021	Super League	7	1	0	0	4
Castleford Tigers	2022	Super League	3	1	0	0	4
Castleford Tigers	Total		108	54	0	0	216
→ Doncaster (loan)	2013	Championship	4	1	0	0	4
→ York City Knights (loan)	2015	League 1	7	9	0	0	36
→ York City Knights (loan)	2022	Championship	1	0	0	0	0
→ York City Knights (loan)	Total		8	9	0	0	36
→ Halifax (DR)	2018	Championship	3	0	0	0	0
Bradford Bulls	2015	Championship	7	3	0	0	12
Bradford Bulls	2016	Championship	23	18	0	0	72
Bradford Bulls	Total		30	21	0	0	84
Leigh Centurions	2017	Super League	5	6	0	0	24
Career total			158	91	0	0	364
