= Jake Webster =

New Zealand international rugby league player and coach

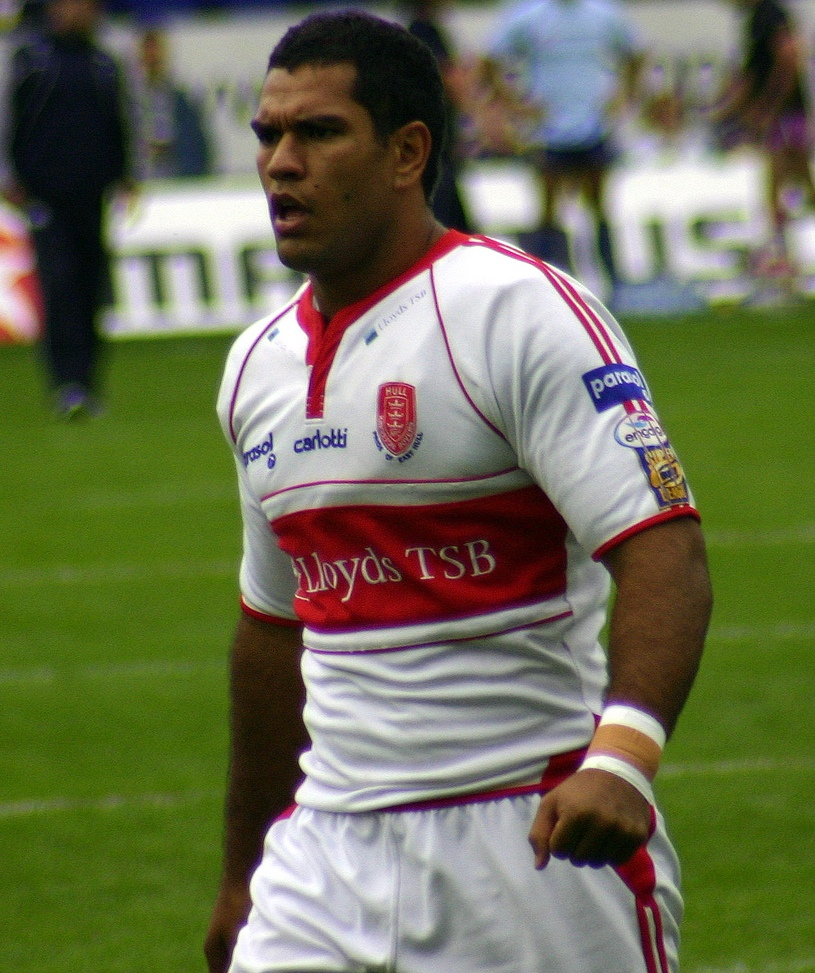

Personal information
- Full name: Jake Ngapera Webster
- Born: 29 October 1983 (age 43) Melbourne, Victoria, Australia
- Height: 6 ft 0 in (1.82 m)
- Weight: 14 st 13 lb (95 kg)

Playing information
- Position: Centre, Wing, Second-row
Club
Years	Team	Pld	T	G	FG	P
2003–06	Melbourne Storm	49	28	0	0	112
2007	Gold Coast Titans	18	4	0	0	16
2008–12	Hull Kingston Rovers	105	41	7	0	178
2013–18	Castleford Tigers	124	49	0	0	196
2014(DR)	→ York City Knights	1	0	0	0	0
2019	Bradford Bulls	25	12	0	0	48
2020–24	Keighley Cougars	28	17	0	0	68
	Total	350	151	7	0	618
Representative
Years	Team	Pld	T	G	FG	P
2005–07	New Zealand	8	5	0	0	20

Coaching information
Club
Years	Team	Gms	W	D	L	W%
2024–25	Keighley Cougars	12	6	0	6	50
2025–	Nigeria
	Total	12	6	0	6	50
- Source: As of 23 February 2025

Jake Ngapera Webster (born 29 October 1983) is a former New Zealand international rugby league footballer who last played as a centre for the Keighley Cougars in League 1.

He previously played as a centre and winger for the Melbourne Storm and Gold Coast Titans in the NRL, and as a centre and second-row forward for the Castleford Tigers and Hull Kingston Rovers in the Super League. Webster also played for the Bradford Bulls in the Championship.

== Early life ==
Webster was born in Melbourne, Victoria, Australia. He is the son of a New Zealand Māori father, Steven and Greek mother, Madeline, spent the early years of his life in Moonee Ponds before moving to Brisbane, Queensland with his father. When in Brisbane, Webster was educated at Wavell State High School.

He began his rugby league career as an eight-year-old with the Valleys rugby league club and remained with the club through to under-18s. In 2001, Webster was selected in the Queensland under-19s side and was offered a Storm contract soon after.

== Playing career ==
=== National Rugby League ===
Webster was the first Melbourne-born player to play with the Melbourne Storm, making his debut for the club in round 2 of the 2003 NRL season. It would be Webster's only appearance in the NRL that year after he ruptured his anterior cruciate ligament the following week playing for Norths Devils in the Queensland Cup.

Returning to the field in 2004, Webster would score a hat-trick in his third NRL appearance in a 50–4 win for Melbourne against South Sydney. Webster had limited opportunities in the 2004 season, mostly playing for Melbourne's feeder club Norths Devils.

In 2005, Webster was a regular member of the Storm squad, making 24 appearances and scoring 10 tries, including the first try in the qualifying final against the Brisbane Broncos.

At the end of the 2005 NRL season, Webster made his international debut for New Zealand in the 2005 Tri-Nations tournament. He would finish level on top of the scoring table with five tries in five appearances for the Kiwis, playing on the wing as New Zealand won the final 24–0 against Australia.

In round 16 of the 2006 NRL season, he scored a memorable last minute try against Canterbury-Bankstown Bulldogs in what was called one of the greatest games of that season. A few weeks later, Webster would score four tries against the Wests Tigers to equal the club's then record for individual tries in a match.

Webster wasn't able to maintain his spot in the Storm squad as the season progressed, not making the Melbourne team that would play in the 2006 NRL Grand Final. He would make 49 appearances for the Storm, scoring 28 tries. Due to surgery on a shoulder injury, Webster was forced to withdraw for selection for New Zealand ahead of the 2006 Tri-Nations.

Offered a contract by the expansion Gold Coast Titans, Webster signed in 2006 to become a part of the club's inaugural 2007 season, scoring a try in the club's first match in round 1. He was selected to play for the New Zealand national team on the wing in the 2007 ANZAC Test loss against Australia.

Webster agreed a deal to join English Super League side Hull Kingston Rovers on 30 August 2007 for a reported three year £100,000 per year contract after being released by the Titans. He had made 18 appearances for the Titans in their first season, scoring four tries.

=== Super League ===
Webster made his Super League début in a 20–12 defeat by Leeds Rhinos in which he scored a brace and Hull Kingston Rovers' only tries. He would make a good start to the 2010 season filling in for Paul Cooke at stand off and scoring a try in the opening fixture against Salford City Reds.

On 26 June, Webster signed for Castleford Tigers on a three-year deal, starting in 2013.

In March 2014, after missing rugby league action for nearly 12 months out with injury, Webster was given game time to play for the York City Knights in the League 1 competition. Later in 2014, Webster helped Castleford reach their first Challenge Cup Final since 1992. He was a key player in the squad that achieved this, and scored a try against Widnes in the Semi-Final. He played in the 2014 Challenge Cup Final defeat by the Leeds Rhinos at Wembley Stadium.

Webster scored four tries against Wakefield Trinity in August 2017 to seal Castleford's place at the top of Super League, helping the club achieve their first ever top-flight league title. He also played for the Tigers in the Grand Final in the same season.

Webster's departure from Castleford was announced in August 2018. Throughout his time with the club, Webster was regarded as a fans' favourite, stating "The biggest memory from my time here at Castleford will be the fans in the stands."

=== Lower leagues ===
In August 2018, Webster signed for Bradford Bulls on a two-year deal. At the end of the 2019 season and having scored 11 tries in 25 appearances for the Bulls, Webster left the club part way through his contract to join League 1 neighbours Keighley Cougars on a two-year deal.

Webster signed a new contract with Keighley in September 2022 which came after his appointment as a commercial executive of the club. The contract saw him remain as a member of the playing squad while also transitioning to a coaching role. He would announce his effective retirement from playing at the end of the 2023 season due to troublesome knee injuries.

12 months after a cancelled testimonial match, Webster made one final appearance for Keighley in a preseason testimonial match against Castleford in January 2024. Webster retired from rugby league to focus on his off-field role as director of rugby at the club.

== Coaching career ==
=== Keighley Cougars ===
Webster was appointed interim head coach at Keighley in 2024 after Matt Foster left the club. The appointment was made permanent in October 2024. After just one game of the 2025 league season Webster stepped down from the head coach role, following heavy defeats to Rochdale Hornet in the league and York Knights in the Challenge Cup, citing "...the negative press, my mental health and wellbeing needs..". Jordie Hedges will act as the club’s interim coach

== Statistics ==
Appearances and points in all competitions by year
Club	Season	Tier	App	T	G	DG	Pts
Melbourne Storm	2003	NRL	1	0	0	0	0
Melbourne Storm	2004	NRL	6	3	0	0	12
Melbourne Storm	2005	NRL	24	10	0	0	40
Melbourne Storm	2006	NRL	18	15	0	0	60
Melbourne Storm	Total		49	28	0	0	112
Gold Coast Titans	2007	NRL	18	4	0	0	16
Hull Kingston Rovers	2008	Super League	26	10	7	0	54
Hull Kingston Rovers	2009	Super League	26	12	0	0	48
Hull Kingston Rovers	2010	Super League	15	4	0	0	16
Hull Kingston Rovers	2011	Super League	25	12	0	0	48
Hull Kingston Rovers	2012	Super League	13	3	0	0	12
Hull Kingston Rovers	Total		105	41	7	0	178
Castleford Tigers	2013	Super League	7	4	0	0	16
Castleford Tigers	2014	Super League	22	7	0	0	28
Castleford Tigers	2015	Super League	19	3	0	0	12
Castleford Tigers	2016	Super League	23	14	0	0	56
Castleford Tigers	2017	Super League	28	16	0	0	64
Castleford Tigers	2018	Super League	25	5	0	0	20
Castleford Tigers	Total		124	49	0	0	196
→ York City Knights (DR)	2014	League 1	1	0	0	0	0
Bradford Bulls	2019	Championship	25	12	0	0	48
Keighley Cougars	2020	League 1	2	1	0	0	4
Keighley Cougars	2021	League 1	13	8	0	0	32
Keighley Cougars	2022	League 1	12	8	0	0	32
Keighley Cougars	2023	Championship	1	0	0	0	0
Keighley Cougars	Total		28	17	0	0	68
Career total			350	151	7	0	618
