= Michael Shenton =

England international rugby league footballer

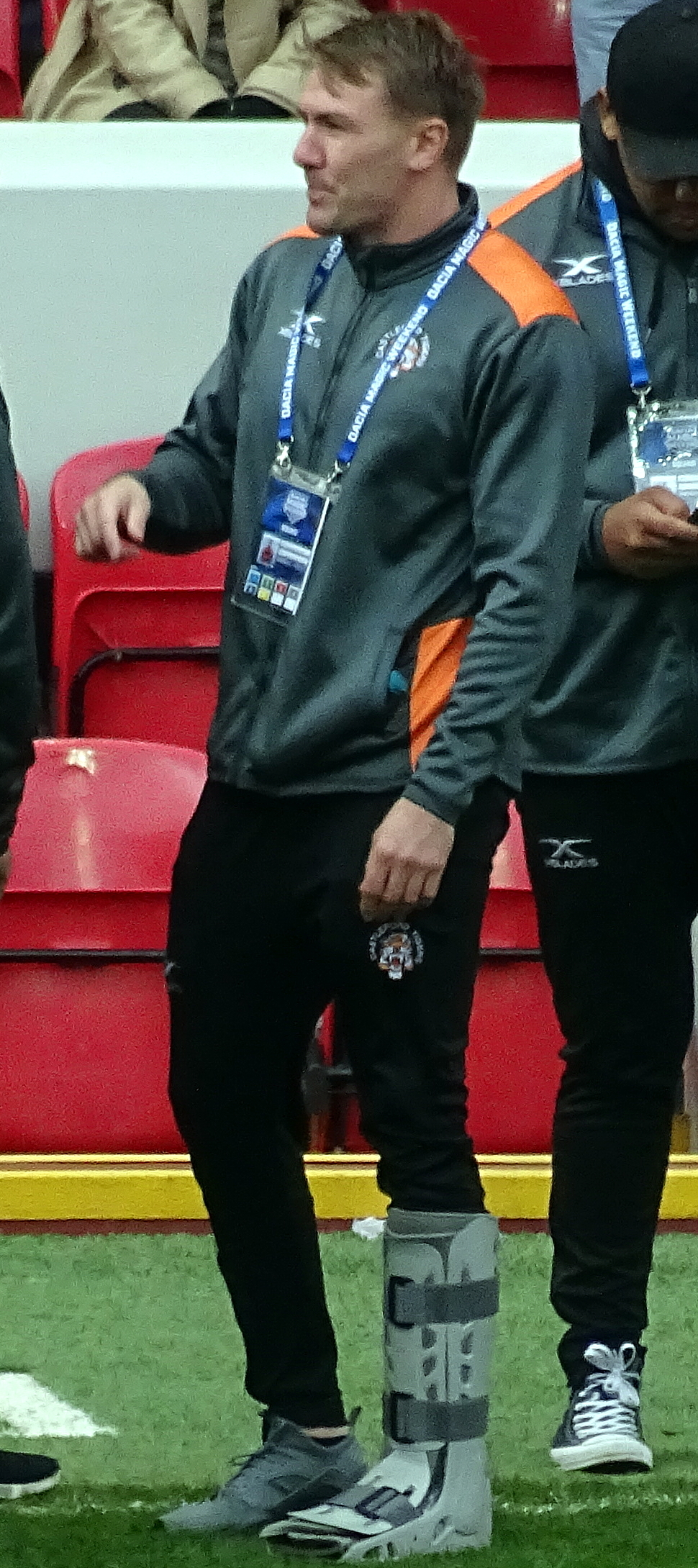

Personal information
- Full name: Michael Shenton
- Born: 22 July 1986 (age 39) Pontefract, West Yorkshire, England

Playing information
- Height: 6 ft 3 in (1.90 m)
- Weight: 14 st 9 lb (93 kg)
- Position: Centre
Club
| Years | Team | Pld | T | G | FG | P |
|---|---|---|---|---|---|---|
| 2004–10 | Castleford Tigers | 153 | 93 | 0 | 0 | 372 |
| 2011–12 | St Helens | 58 | 20 | 0 | 0 | 80 |
| 2013–21 | Castleford Tigers | 194 | 68 | 0 | 0 | 272 |
| | Total | 405 | 181 | 0 | 0 | 724 |
Representative
| Years | Team | Pld | T | G | FG | P |
| 2008–14 | England | 12 | 3 | 0 | 0 | 12 |

Michael Shenton (born 22 July 1986) is an English professional rugby league coach who is an assistant coach at Wakefield Trinity in the Super League, and a former professional rugby league footballer.

An England international centre, he made his Castleford Tigers debut in 2004 and played over 150 times for the club before transferring to St Helens in 2010. In June 2012, Shenton signed a deal to re-join Castleford from the 2013 season, and it was later announced that he would be club captain.

Having played more than 300 games for the Tigers in all competitions, Shenton holds the club record for most Super League appearances after overtaking Danny Orr. In 2017, he became the first Castleford captain to lead the club to a top-flight league title. He featured in the Super League Dream Team on three occasions.

== Biography ==
Shenton was born in Pontefract, West Yorkshire, England.

Shenton is a product of the Castleford Tigers academy set up, beginning his professional career in 2004. Shenton was a member of the England Elite Training Squad as well, alongside his former Castleford Tigers teammate Joe Westerman. The 2010 Engage Super League season was Shenton's last season with his home town club before signing a three-year deal with St. Helens on 3 August 2010. He returned to the Tigers in 2013.

== Club career ==
=== Castleford Tigers ===
Shenton made his Castleford Tigers début on 1 May 2004 in a 28 v 42 defeat by Wigan Warriors. That year he was also a member of the winning U18s Academy Grand Final Side that played against St. Helens.

In 2005, Shenton was establishing himself as a first team regular in the squad as a winger. As the season went on, Shenton moved into the centre of the side at the time. Tigers Head Coach David Woods said he was like NRL and Penrith Panthers Star Luke Lewis. Also in that year, Shenton played in the Northern Rail Cup Final against Hull Kingston Rovers. Shenton also played in the National League Grand Final against Whitehaven Rugby League, which Castleford won 36–8.

2006 was another bad year for the Tigers, but it was a good year personally for Shenton who gave a good account of himself and showed that he was of Super League quality. Shenton had many rugby league pundits talking about him after his performance in Castleford Tigers 80th anniversary game on 16 July, in which they defeated Leeds Rhinos 31–30. At the end of the season, Castleford were relegated and there were a lot of Super League clubs, including Wakefield Trinity Wildcats and Hull FC, chasing Shenton.

2007 saw Shenton stay loyal with his home-town club. It was a great season for both the Tigers and Shenton. Shenton was named in the National League One Dream Team, and was a member of the squad that won the National League One Champions trophy (finishing 1st in the league). He was a member of The National League One Grand Final team that won Cas promotion back to Super League. There were still a lot of super league clubs, including Bradford Bulls, chasing Shenton.

On 23 August 2008, Shenton made his 100th appearance for the club in a 44–24 victory against Warrington Wolves. At the Tigers' end of season awards, Shenton won Back of The Year. 2009 showed Shenton grow as a senior player in the squad. At the Tigers' end of season awards, Shenton won Back of The Year again. He also won the Castleford Tigers Supporters Club's Special Achievement Award.

2010 proved to be Shenton's last season of his first spell with the Tigers.

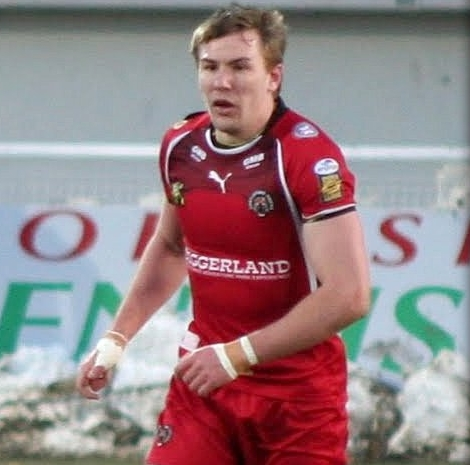
Shenton playing for Castleford in 2010

Shenton finished his time with the Tigers against his new club, St Helens, in their last league game at Knowsley Road. Shenton was the 2nd longest serving Castleford player in the squad, behind teammate Craig Huby.

=== St Helens ===
Shenton signed for St Helens on a three-year Deal. Shenton scored his first try for the club in a 56–22 win over Salford.

He played in the 2011 Super League Grand Final defeat by Leeds at Old Trafford.

=== Return to Castleford Tigers ===
Shenton's return to Castleford from the 2013 season was announced on 7 June 2012. He signed a four-year deal with the Tigers. It was later announced in December that he would be the club captain.

On 27 March 2014, Shenton scored the 100th try of his Castleford career in their 54–6 win over London Broncos. Shenton led out Castleford at the 2014 Challenge Cup Final defeat by the Leeds Rhinos at Wembley Stadium. He was named in the Super League Dream Team in 2014.

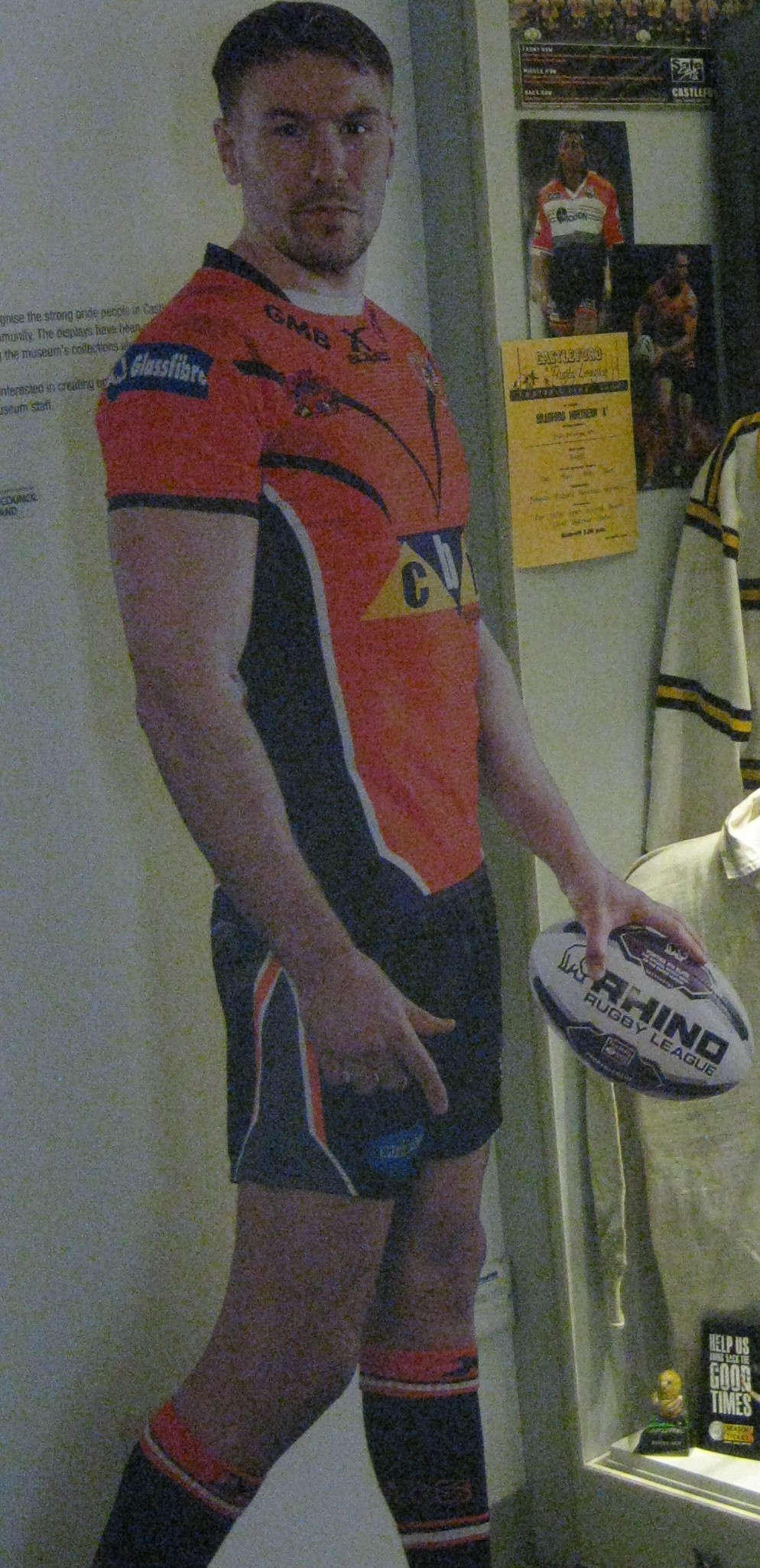
Shenton in Castleford kit

Shenton was named in the Super League Dream Team for the second consecutive year at the end of the 2015 season.

On 7 February 2016, Shenton was on the receiving end of a tackle by Hull KR's John Boudebza in the opening fixture of the Super League, sustaining an anterior cruciate ligament (ACL) knee injury. This injury resulted in Shenton missing the entirety of the 2016 season.

In 2017, Shenton captained Castleford to a 1st-placed finish in Super League, winning the club's first ever top-flight league title. He lifted the League Leaders' Shield on 17 August following a 45–20 victory against local rivals Wakefield Trinity. Shenton also led out the Castleford team for the 2017 Super League Grand Final defeat by the Leeds Rhinos at Old Trafford.

Shenton was named in the Super League Dream Team for the third time in his career at the end of the 2017 season.

Shenton celebrated his testimonial year in 2020, playing against Toronto Wolfpack on 19 January for his testimonial match.

On 17 July 2021, he captained Castleford in their 2021 Challenge Cup Final defeat against St Helens at Wembley.

== International career ==
Shenton made his international début for England on 10 October 2008, defeating Wales 74–0 at the Keepmoat Stadium. Shenton was called into the 2008 Rugby League World Cup train-on squad but missed out on going to Australia.

In 2009, Shenton played in England's mid-season international against France on 13 June. He also played against Wales in the Four Nations warm-up match on 17 October. Shenton played in all 4 of England's matches in the Four Nations, including in the Final against Australia.

In 2010, Shenton played in the mid-season international against France on 12 June, scoring his 1st England try in their 60–6 victory at Leigh Sports Village. He played against New Zealand Māori on 16 October in the Four Nations warm-up match. Shenton played in the opening match of the Four Nations 2010, against New Zealand on 23 October.

In 2011, Shenton played in the International Origin match against the Exiles on 10 June at Headingley.

In 2014, Shenton played and scored a try for England in the opening match of the Four Nations 2014 against Samoa.

== Coaching career ==
Following his retirement as a player, Shenton joined Hull F.C. as the reserves and academy team coach and head of emerging talent.

He is currently the assistant coach to Daryl Powell at Wakefield Trinity.

== Career summary ==
Signed from Amateur Club – Upton RLFC

=== Honours ===
- 2004 – U18s Academy Grand Final Winner
- 2005 – Northern Rail Cup Final Runners-up
- 2005 – National League One Grand Final Winner
- 2007 – National League One Grand Final Winner
- 2008 – England Rugby League Début
- 2009 – Four Nations Runners-up
- 2011 – Super League Grand Final Runners-up
- 2014 – Challenge Cup Final Runners-up
- 2017 – Super League League Leaders Shield Winners
- 2017 – Super League Grand Final Runners-up
- 2021 – Challenge Cup Final Runners-up

=== Club statistics ===
Appearances and points in all competitions by year
| Club | Season | Tier | App | T | G | DG | Pts |
|---|---|---|---|---|---|---|---|
| Castleford Tigers | 2004 | Super League | 3 | 0 | 0 | 0 | 0 |
| Castleford Tigers | 2005 | National League One | 29 | 24 | 0 | 0 | 96 |
| Castleford Tigers | 2006 | Super League | 27 | 8 | 0 | 0 | 32 |
| Castleford Tigers | 2007 | National League One | 20 | 19 | 0 | 0 | 76 |
| Castleford Tigers | 2008 | Super League | 22 | 13 | 0 | 0 | 52 |
| Castleford Tigers | 2009 | Super League | 30 | 19 | 0 | 0 | 76 |
| Castleford Tigers | 2010 | Super League | 22 | 10 | 0 | 0 | 40 |
| Castleford Tigers | 2013 | Super League | 27 | 5 | 0 | 0 | 20 |
| Castleford Tigers | 2014 | Super League | 32 | 18 | 0 | 0 | 72 |
| Castleford Tigers | 2015 | Super League | 28 | 14 | 0 | 0 | 56 |
| Castleford Tigers | 2016 | Super League | 1 | 0 | 0 | 0 | 0 |
| Castleford Tigers | 2017 | Super League | 28 | 7 | 0 | 0 | 28 |
| Castleford Tigers | 2018 | Super League | 30 | 10 | 0 | 0 | 40 |
| Castleford Tigers | 2019 | Super League | 12 | 3 | 0 | 0 | 12 |
| Castleford Tigers | 2020 | Super League | 17 | 7 | 0 | 0 | 28 |
| Castleford Tigers | 2021 | Super League | 19 | 4 | 0 | 0 | 16 |
| Castleford Tigers | Total | | 347 | 161 | 0 | 0 | 644 |
| St Helens | 2011 | Super League | 32 | 13 | 0 | 0 | 52 |
| St Helens | 2012 | Super League | 26 | 7 | 0 | 0 | 28 |
| St Helens | Total | | 58 | 20 | 0 | 0 | 80 |
| Career total | | | 405 | 181 | 0 | 0 | 724 |

=== England statistics ===
| Against | App | T | G | FG | Pts |
|---|---|---|---|---|---|
| Australia | 2 | 0 | 0 | 0 | 0 |
| Exiles | 1 | 0 | 0 | 0 | 0 |
| France | 3 | 2 | 0 | 0 | 8 |
| Māori | 1 | 0 | 0 | 0 | 0 |
| New Zealand | 2 | 0 | 0 | 0 | 0 |
| Samoa | 1 | 1 | 0 | 0 | 4 |
| Wales | 2 | 0 | 0 | 0 | 0 |
| Totals | 12 | 3 | 0 | 0 | 12 |
