= Daryl Clark =

GB & England international rugby league footballer

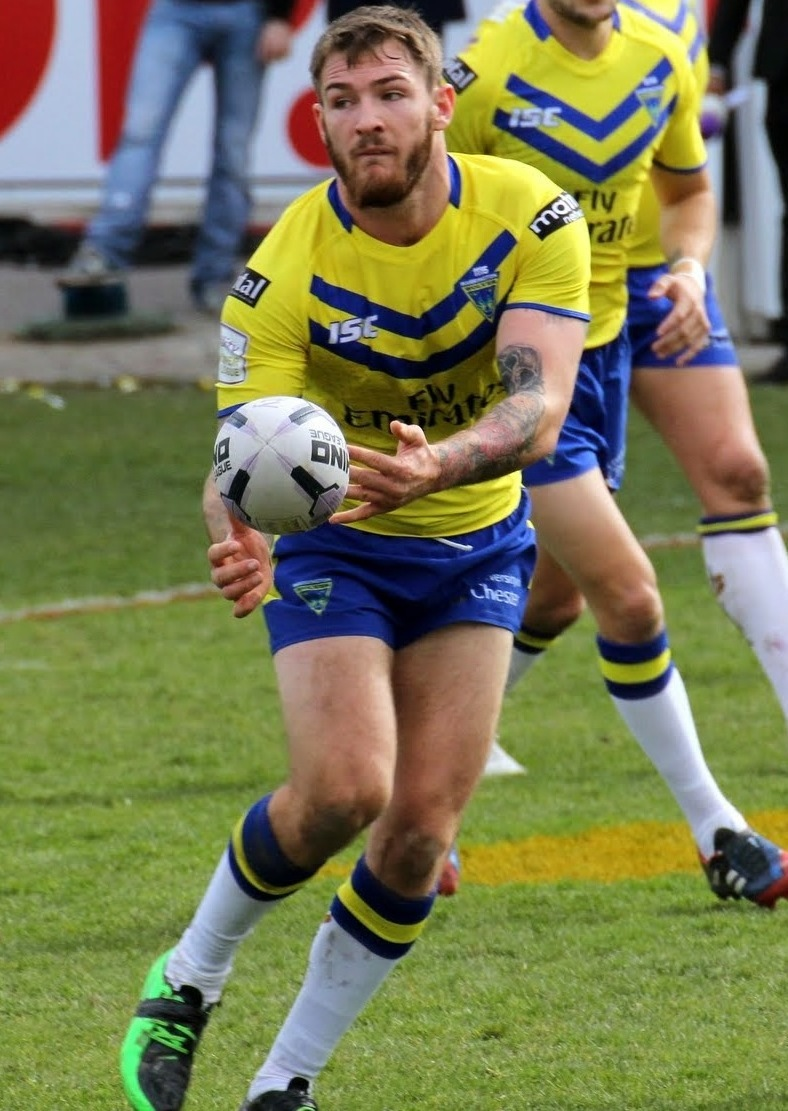

Personal information
- Full name: Daryl Clark
- Born: 10 February 1993 (age 33) Castleford, West Yorkshire, England
- Height: 6 ft 0 in (1.83 m)
- Weight: 14 st 5 lb (91 kg)

Playing information
- Position: Hooker
Club
Years	Team	Pld	T	G	FG	P
2011–14	Castleford Tigers	94	37	0	0	148
2015–23	Warrington Wolves	243	51	0	0	204
2024–	St Helens	70	18	0	0	72
	Total	407	106	0	0	424
Representative
Years	Team	Pld	T	G	FG	P
2012	England Knights	1	0	0	0	0
2014–25	England	16	2	0	0	8
2019	Great Britain	2	1	0	0	4
2022	Combined Nations All Stars	1	0	0	0	0
- Source: As of 4 August 2026

Daryl Clark (born 10 February 1993) is an English professional rugby league footballer who plays as a hooker for St Helens in the Super League and England at international level.

He has previously played for Castleford Tigers and Warrington Wolves in the Super League.

== Background ==
Clark was born in Castleford, West Yorkshire, England. He is of Scottish descent.

He attended Airedale High School and played amateur rugby for Fryston Warriors.

== Playing career ==
=== Castleford Tigers ===
Clark started his professional career with hometown club Castleford, making his debut in February 2011. He made 21 appearances in his first season at the club, and was rewarded with a five-year contract.

Clark played in the 2014 Challenge Cup Final defeat by the Leeds Rhinos at Wembley Stadium.

In August 2014, it was confirmed that Clark had been signed by Warrington for a fee of £185,000. In his final season with the club, he won the 2014 Steve Prescott Man of Steel award.

=== Warrington Wolves ===
Clark played in the 2016 Challenge Cup final defeat against Hull F.C. at Wembley Stadium.

Clark played in the 2016 Super League Grand Final defeat against Wigan at Old Trafford.

Clark played in the 2018 Challenge Cup final defeat against Catalans Dragons at Wembley Stadium.

Clark played in the 2018 Super League Grand Final defeat against Wigan at Old Trafford.

Clark played in the 2019 Challenge Cup final victory over St Helens at Wembley Stadium. He scored Warrington's third and final try and was voted man of the match, becoming only the third hooker to win the Lance Todd Trophy.

On 26 July 2023, Clark signed a three-year deal to join St Helens starting in 2024. Clark played 25 games for Warrington in the 2023 Super League season as Warrington finished sixth on the table and qualified for the playoffs. Clark played in the club's elimination playoff loss against his future club St Helens.

=== St Helens ===
In round 1 of the 2024 Super League season, Clark made his club debut for St Helens and scored a try as they defeated the newly-promoted London Broncos 40–4. In round 14, Clark scored a hat-trick in the club's 52–6 victory over London at Twickenham Stoop. Clark played 22 matches for St Helens in the 2024 Super League season which saw the club finish sixth on the table. Clark played in St Helens' golden-point extra-time play-off loss against Warrington.

On 8 August 2025, Clark made his 400th career appearance in St Helens' victory over Wakefield Trinity. Clark played 28 games for St Helens in the 2025 Super League season, including the club's 20–12 play-off semi-final loss against Hull Kingston Rovers. On 9 July 2026, Clark was ruled out for the remainder of the 2026 Super League season with an ankle injury.

== International career ==
In 2011, Clark was named in the Scotland squad, but did not make an appearance. After playing one match for England Knights in 2012, Clark confirmed he would no longer be putting himself forward to play for Scotland, as he would prefer to play for England.

He then made his debut for England in the 2014 Four Nations tournament in Australia.

In October 2016, Clark was selected in England's 2016 Four Nations squad. Before the tournament, England played a test match against France in which Clark scored his first test try in England's 40–6 win.

He was selected in the England 9s squad for the 2019 Rugby League World Cup 9s.

He was selected in squad for the 2019 Great Britain Lions tour of the Southern Hemisphere.

== Statistics ==
Appearances and points in all competitions by year
Club	Season	Tier	App	T	G	DG	Pts
Castleford Tigers	2011	Super League	21	9	0	0	36
Castleford Tigers	2012	Super League	15	4	0	0	16
Castleford Tigers	2013	Super League	28	8	0	0	32
Castleford Tigers	2014	Super League	30	16	0	0	64
Castleford Tigers	Total		94	37	0	0	148
Warrington Wolves	2015	Super League	32	6	0	0	24
Warrington Wolves	2016	Super League	32	10	0	0	40
Warrington Wolves	2017	Super League	24	3	0	0	12
Warrington Wolves	2018	Super League	34	5	0	0	20
Warrington Wolves	2019	Super League	32	9	0	0	36
Warrington Wolves	2020	Super League	18	4	0	0	16
Warrington Wolves	2021	Super League	19	6	0	0	24
Warrington Wolves	2022	Super League	25	5	0	0	20
Warrington Wolves	2023	Super League	27	4	0	0	16
Warrington Wolves	Total		243	52	0	0	208
St Helens	2024	Super League	24	8	0	0	32
St Helens	2025	Super League	28	5	0	0	20
St Helens	2026	Super League	5	3	0	0	12
St Helens	Total		57	16	0	0	64
Career total			394	105	0	0	420

As of match played 7 March 2026
