= Brad Day =

English rugby league footballer

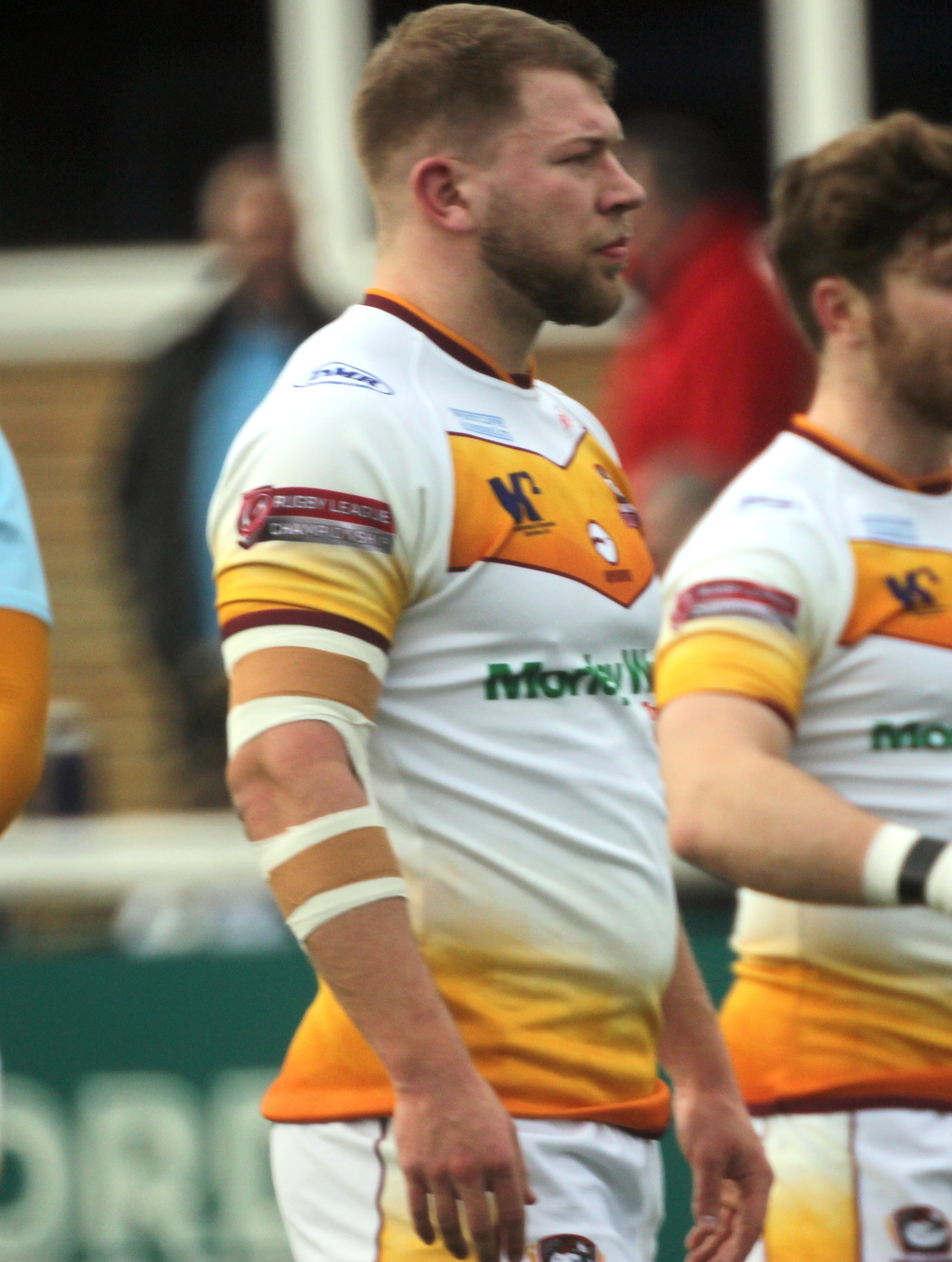

Personal information
- Full name: Bradley Day
- Born: 23 September 1994 (age 31) England
- Height: 5 ft 4 in (1.62 m)
- Weight: 23 st 9 lb (150 kg)

Playing information
- Position: Second-row, Loose forward
Club
Years	Team	Pld	T	G	FG	P
2014	Castleford Tigers	1	0	0	0	0
2015–18	Batley Bulldogs	73	20	1	0	82
2019–21	Featherstone Rovers	41	15	0	0	60
2022	Newcastle Thunder	16	5	0	0	20
2023–25	Featherstone Rovers	49	27	0	0	108
2026	Halifax Panthers	3	2	0	0	8
2026–	Oldham	1	1	0	0	4
	Total	184	70	1	0	282
- Source: As of 20 August 2026

Brad Day (born 23 September 1994) is a professional rugby league footballer who plays as a second-row or loose forward for Oldham in the RFL Championship.

== Playing career ==
Day has previously played for the Castleford Tigers in the Super League and the Batley Bulldogs in the Championship.

=== Newcastle Thunder ===
On 25 October 2021, it was reported that Day had signed for Newcastle Thunder in the RFL Championship.

=== Featherstone Rovers ===
In September 2022, Day signed a contract to join RFL Championship side Featherstone ahead of the 2023 season..

=== Halifax Panthers ===
On 20 January 2026 it was reported that, following Featherstone Rovers being excluded from the 2026 RFL Championship due to falling into administration, he had signed for Halifax Panthers in the RFL Championship

Day scored two tries on his Halifax Panthers debut in the Challenge Cup Round 2 match against London Chargers on Sunday 25 January 2026.

=== Oldham RLFC ===
On 13 February 2026 it was reported that he had signed for Oldham RLFC in the RFL Championship, following the Halifax Panthers going into administration.
