= Liam Finn (rugby league) =

Former Ireland international rugby league footballer

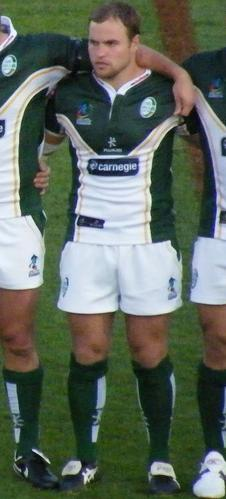

Personal information
- Full name: Liam Richard Finn
- Born: 2 November 1983 (age 42) Halifax, West Yorkshire, England
- Height: 5 ft 11 in (180 cm)
- Weight: 14 st 7 lb (92 kg)

Playing information
- Position: Stand-off, Scrum-half, Hooker
Club
Years	Team	Pld	T	G	FG	P
2002–03	Halifax	22	2	30	1	69
2004–05	Wakefield Trinity Wildcats	2	0	1	0	2
2005	Featherstone Rovers	19	8	80	0	192
2006–09	Dewsbury Rams	109	46	121	5	431
2010–13	Featherstone Rovers	120	63	517	6	1292
2014–15	Castleford Tigers	53	9	6	2	50
2016–18	Wakefield Trinity	80	8	252	0	536
2018(loan)	→ Widnes Vikings	6	0	0	0	0
2019	Newcastle Thunder	3	1	13	0	30
2019–21	Dewsbury Rams	49	4	62	2	142
	Total	463	141	1082	16	2744
Representative
Years	Team	Pld	T	G	FG	P
2007–18	Ireland	30	8	67	0	166

Coaching information
Club
Years	Team	Gms	W	D	L	W%
2022–23	Dewsbury Rams	33	19	2	12	58
2024	Halifax Panthers	32	15	0	17	47
2026	Huddersfield Giants	7	2	0	5	29
	Total	72	36	2	34	50
- Source: As of 10 June 2026

Liam Richard Finn (born 2 November 1983) is a professional rugby league coach who was the interim head coach of the Huddersfield Giants in the Super League. He is a former Ireland international rugby league footballer who played as a scrum-half, stand-off or hooker.

== Background ==
Finn was born in Halifax, West Yorkshire, England.

== Club career ==
After brief stints in the Super League with Halifax and the Wakefield Trinity Wildcats as a young player, Finn spent most of his career in the Championship, playing for Featherstone Rovers and the Dewsbury Rams. He returned to Super League in 2014 with the Castleford Tigers, and played for them in the 2014 Challenge Cup Final defeat by the Leeds Rhinos at Wembley Stadium.

In October 2015, Finn re-joined Wakefield Trinity Wildcats on a two-year deal.

In September 2021, Finn announced that he would be retiring at the end of the season.

=== Testimonial match ===
A benefit season/testimonial match for Liam Finn, allocated by the Rugby Football League, took place at Featherstone Rovers during the 2013 season.

== International career ==
Finn was named in the Ireland squad for the 2008 Rugby League World Cup.

In 2010 he represented Ireland in the Alitalia European Cup. Also he followed up his 2009 Championship 1 Player of the Year award with a Championship player of the year award in 2010 for Featherstone Rovers in his first season back with Rovers.

He was named as captain of Ireland in 2012, and was later confirmed as captain for the 2013 Rugby League World Cup campaign.

He is Ireland's joint most capped player alongside Bob Beswick and is also Ireland's record point scorer.

In November 2014, Finn was called up to play for Ireland in their final European Cup game against Wales. He was a huge influence scoring a total of 18 points in their sides massive 42–14 victory. However, their performance wasn't good enough as Ireland needed to win by 41 points if they were to secure the European Cup title, a place in the 2016 Four Nations and 2017 Rugby League World Cup.

Unlike 2014, Finn was called up to the Irish squad in October before the European Cup which began on 17 October 2015.

In 2016 he was called up to the Ireland squad for the 2017 Rugby League World Cup European Pool B qualifiers.

== Coaching career ==
=== Dewsbury Rams ===
Finn joined the Dewsbury Rams as their head coach in June 2022.

=== Halifax Panthers ===
In August 2023, Finn was appointed as head coach of Halifax Panthers on a three-year deal from the 2024 season.

=== Huddersfield Giants ===
On 26 September 2024, it was announced that he would take up an assistant coach role at Huddersfield Giants for 2025

Taken on the roll of interim coach of Huddersfield Giants from 28 March 2026 following departure of Luke Robinson.
