= Lee Jewitt =

English professional rugby league footballer

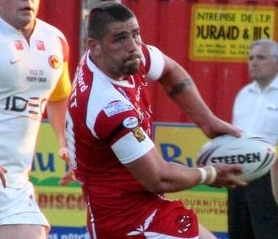

Personal information
- Full name: Lee Jewitt
- Born: 14 February 1987 (age 39) Oldham, Greater Manchester, England
- Height: 5 ft 11 in (180 cm)
- Weight: 16 st 5 lb (104 kg)

Playing information
- Position: Prop, Loose forward, Second-row
Club
Years	Team	Pld	T	G	FG	P
2005	Wigan Warriors	2	0	0	0	0
2007–13	Salford City Reds	105	6	0	0	24
2013–14	Limoux Grizzlies	11	0	0	0	0
2014–16	Castleford Tigers	40	1	0	0	4
2017	Townsville Blackhawks	1	0	0	0	0
2017–19	Hull Kingston Rovers	24	1	0	0	4
2020	Barrow Raiders	0	0	0	0	0
2021	Widnes Vikings	0	0	0	0	0
	Total	183	8	0	0	32
- Source: As of 11 February 2021

Lee Jewitt (born 14 February 1987) is an English professional rugby league footballer who plays as a prop.

He played for Wigan Warriors, Salford City Reds, Castleford Tigers and Hull Kingston Rovers in the Super League. He also played for the Widnes Vikings in the RFL Championship, Limoux Grizzlies in the Elite One Championship and the Townsville Blackhawks in the Queensland Cup.

== Background ==
Jewitt was born in Oldham, Greater Manchester, England.

== Early career ==
=== 2003-05 ===
Jewitt played in the Wigan Warriors' Academy System at under-18's level, between 2003 and 2005.

=== 2004-05 ===
Jewitt then later stepped-up into the under-21's in 2004 and 2005.

== Senior career ==
=== 2005 ===
Jewitt was later drafted into Wigan first-team squad in September 2005, before the derby with St. Helens.

=== 2007-13 ===
Jewitt then moved to the Salford City Reds, representing them through 2007-13. Jewitt recorded over one-hundred appearances for the Salford club.

=== 2013-14 ===
Jewitt then moved to the Limoux Grizzlies in south-west France. He spent only two-years with the club, before returning to the United Kingdom.

=== 2014 ===
On 2 May 2014, Jewitt signed for the Castleford Tigers for the rest of the 2014 season after leaving Limoux. He played in the 2014 Challenge Cup Final defeat by Leeds at Wembley Stadium. Jewitt represented the Castleford Tigers for three-years and he played for the West Yorkshire outfit during the 2014, 2015 and 2016 rugby league seasons.

=== 2017 ===
Jewitt then signed for Australian QLD Cup side the Townsville Blackhawks. He then subsequently decided to move back to his homeland, after his family failed to adjust to life in a different country.

=== 2017 ===
Jewitt made his Hull Kingston Rovers' début on 18 June 2017, after signing an 18-month contract in the wake of his departure from the Townsville Blackhawks. Jewitt earned promotion with Hull Kingston Rovers back to the Super League in his first season with the club.

=== 2018 ===
It was revealed on 12 July 2018, that Jewitt has signed a new two-year contract extension at Hull Kingston Rovers, keeping him at the club until at least the end of the 2020 season.

=== 2019 ===
It was revealed on 20 May 2019, that Jewitt had departed Hull Kingston Rovers after an injury ravaged spell with the club. Despite being under contract until the end of the 2020 season, Jewitt decided it was the right decision to make in order to recover from multiple injuries.

=== Widnes Vikings ===
On 7 August 2020 it was reported that he had signed for Widnes in the RFL Championship Jewitt left Widnes before the start of the 2022 season.
