= Frankie Mariano =

Scotland international rugby league footballer

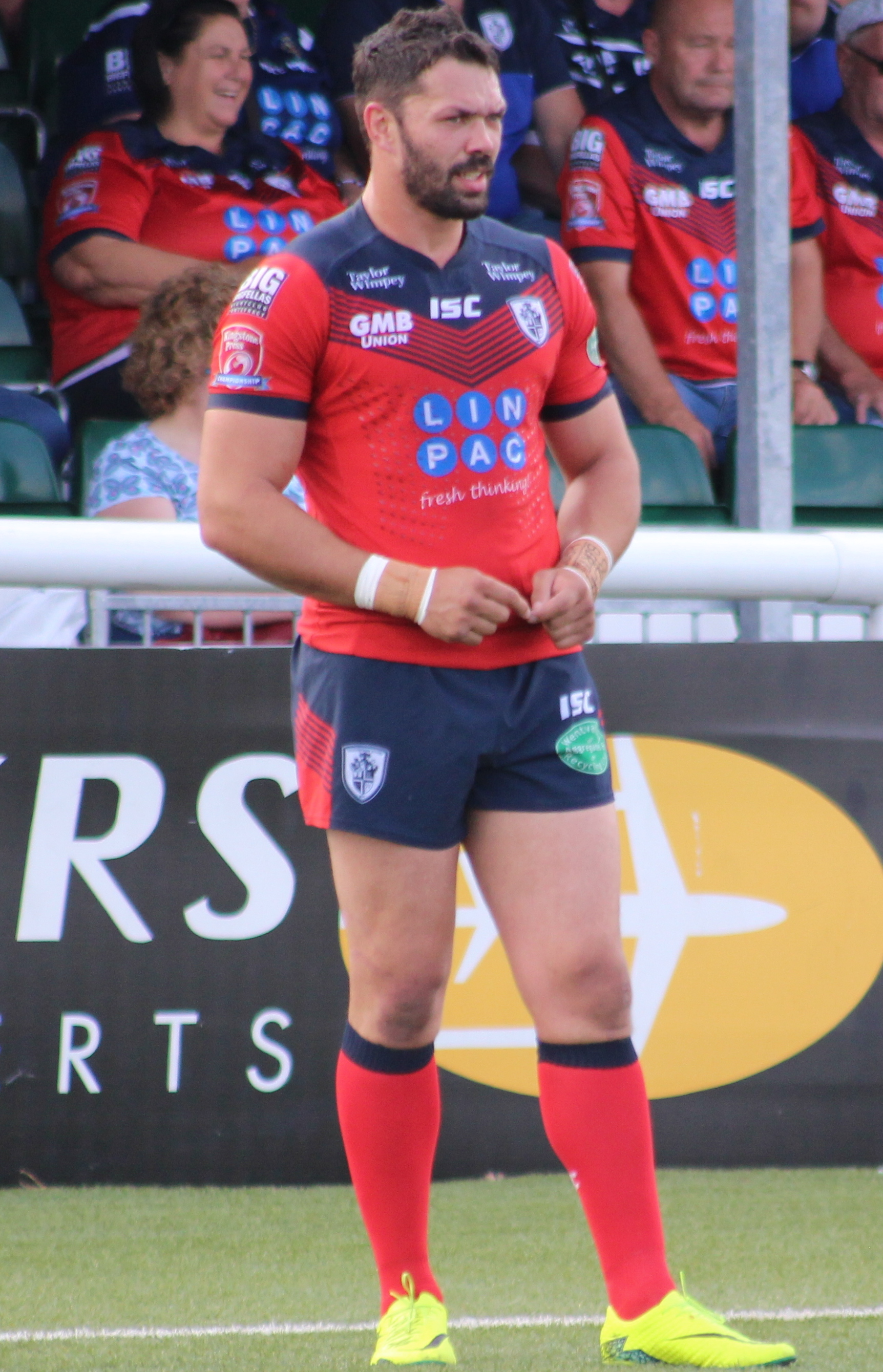

Personal information
- Born: 10 May 1987 (age 39) Hull, Humberside, England
- Height: 6 ft 3 in (1.91 m)
- Weight: 17 st 5 lb (110 kg)

Playing information
- Position: Second-row, Loose forward, Prop
Club
Years	Team	Pld	T	G	FG	P
2009–10	Hull Kingston Rovers	4	0	0	0	0
2011–13	Wakefield Trinity Wildcats	56	21	0	0	84
2013(loan)	→ Featherstone Rovers	5	5	0	0	20
2014–16	Castleford Tigers	40	9	0	0	36
2016(loan)	→ Batley Bulldogs	4	0	0	0	0
2017–18	Featherstone Rovers	28	8	0	0	34
2018–19	Doncaster	15	5	0	0	20
2020–21	Sheffield Eagles	10	0	0	0	0
	Total	162	48	0	0	194
Representative
Years	Team	Pld	T	G	FG	P
2016–21	Scotland	8	1	0	0	4
- Source: As of 19 September 2021

Frankie Mariano (born 10 May 1987) is a retired Scotland international rugby league footballer who played as a prop, second-row or loose forward.

He played for Hull Kingston Rovers, the Wakefield Trinity Wildcats, Featherstone Rovers (two spells, including the first on loan), the Castleford Tigers and the Batley Bulldogs (loan) in the Betfred Championship

== Background ==
Mariano was born in England and is of Scottish, American and Cape Verdean descent.

== Playing career ==
Mariano made his first team début for Hull Kingston Rovers in 2009 in the Challenge Cup round 5 victory over the Sheffield Eagles which Hull Kingston Rovers won 34–24.

He moved to Wakefield Trinity Wildcats in 2011 and spent three years at the club, before joining the Castleford Tigers in 2014.

On 16 May 2014, Frankie's excellent form to start the season saw him sign a two-year deal to stay with the Tigers.

He featured for the Castleford Tigers in the 2014 Challenge Cup Final defeat by the Leeds Rhinos at Wembley Stadium.

He featured in 2016 for the Castleford Tigers in the Super League. He previously played for Hull Kingston Rovers and the Wakefield Trinity Wildcats.
