= Scott Wheeldon =

English rugby league footballer (born 1986)

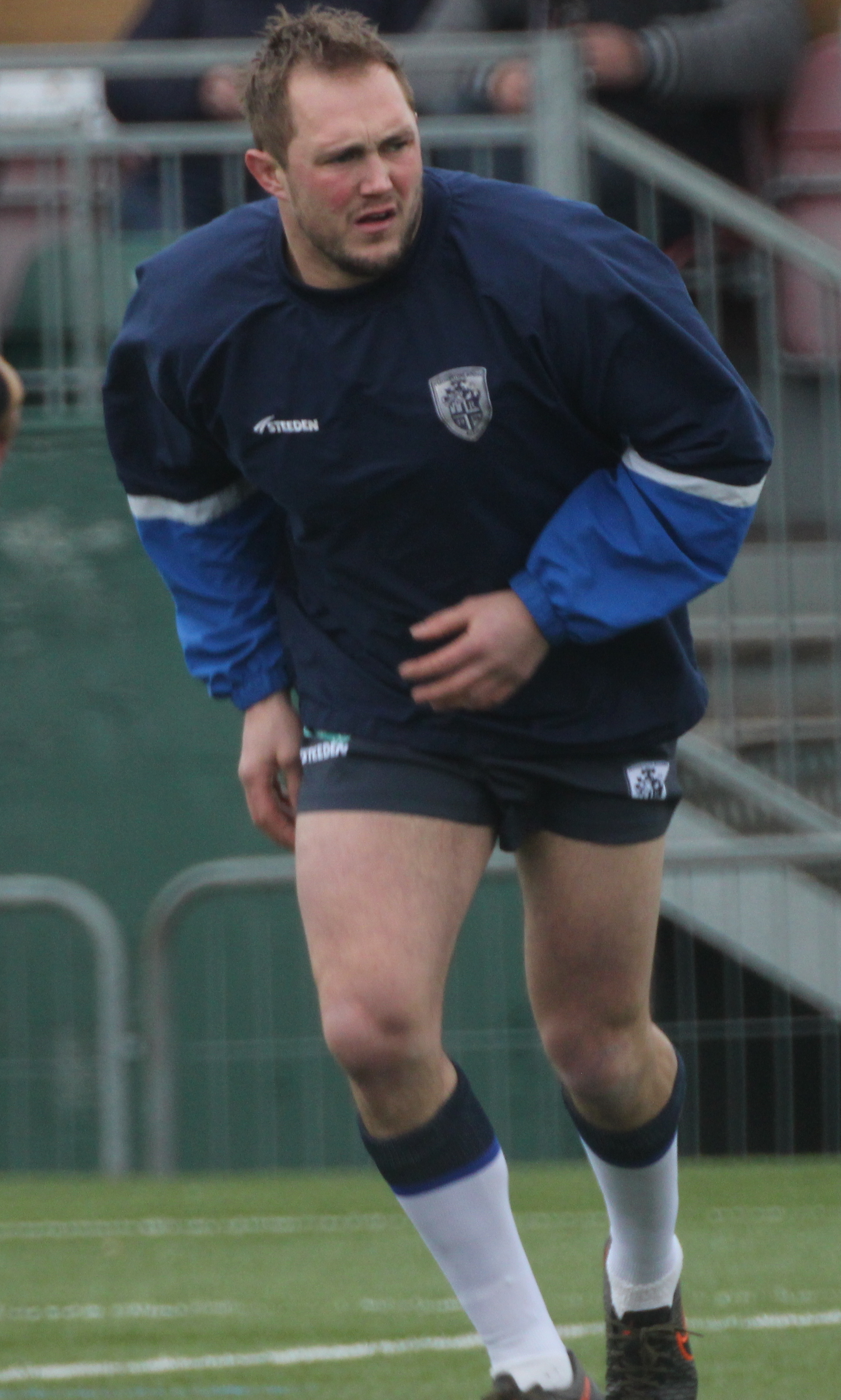

Personal information
- Born: 23 February 1986 (age 40) Hull, Humberside, England

Playing information
- Height: 6 ft 0 in (183 cm)
- Weight: 16 st 7 lb (105 kg)
- Position: Prop
Club
Years	Team	Pld	T	G	FG	P
2005–08	Hull FC	62	4	0	0	16
2005(loan)	→ Featherstone Rovers
2009–12	Hull Kingston Rovers	75	4	0	0	16
2012–13	London Broncos	36	5	0	0	20
2013(loan)	→ London Skolars	1	0	0	0	0
2014–15	Castleford Tigers	42	5	0	0	20
2016–17	Sheffield Eagles	57	12	0	0	48
2018–19	Featherstone Rovers	37	1	0	0	4
2020–21	Sheffield Eagles	16	0	0	0	0
	Total	326	31	0	0	124

Scott Wheeldon (born 23 February 1986) is a English former professional rugby league footballer who played as a prop for Hull F.C., Hull KR, London Broncos, Castleford Tigers, Featherstone Rovers and Sheffield Eagles.

== Background ==
Wheeldon was born in Kingston upon Hull, Humberside, England.

== Career ==
He is a product of Hull FC's academy ranks.

Wheeldon made his Super League début in 2006. In the same year, he appeared for Hull F.C. in the 2006 Super League Grand final, playing from the interchange bench in his side's 4-26 defeat by St. Helens.

Wheeldon then went on to sign for local rivals Hull Kingston Rovers in 2008 and made his début in the Robins home game against Celtic Crusaders.

Wheeldon transferred to London Broncos in 2012 and spent two seasons there before joining the Castleford Tigers in 2014.

He featured for the Tigers in the 2014 Challenge Cup Final defeat by the Leeds Rhinos at Wembley Stadium. In 2014 Wheeldon was voted the best player of table 21 at the Castleford Tigers end of year player awards.

In November 2015, it was announced that Wheeldon had signed for Sheffield Eagles on a 3-year deal. However, two seasons later he was released having played over 50 games and scoring 12 tries.

Following his release by the Eagles, Wheeldon joined their Championship rivals Featherstone Rovers in October 2017.

Having played 37 during the 2018 season for "Fev", Wheeldon re-joined the Eagles, where he ended his senior playing career in 2021.
