= Richard Owen (rugby league) =

English rugby league footballer

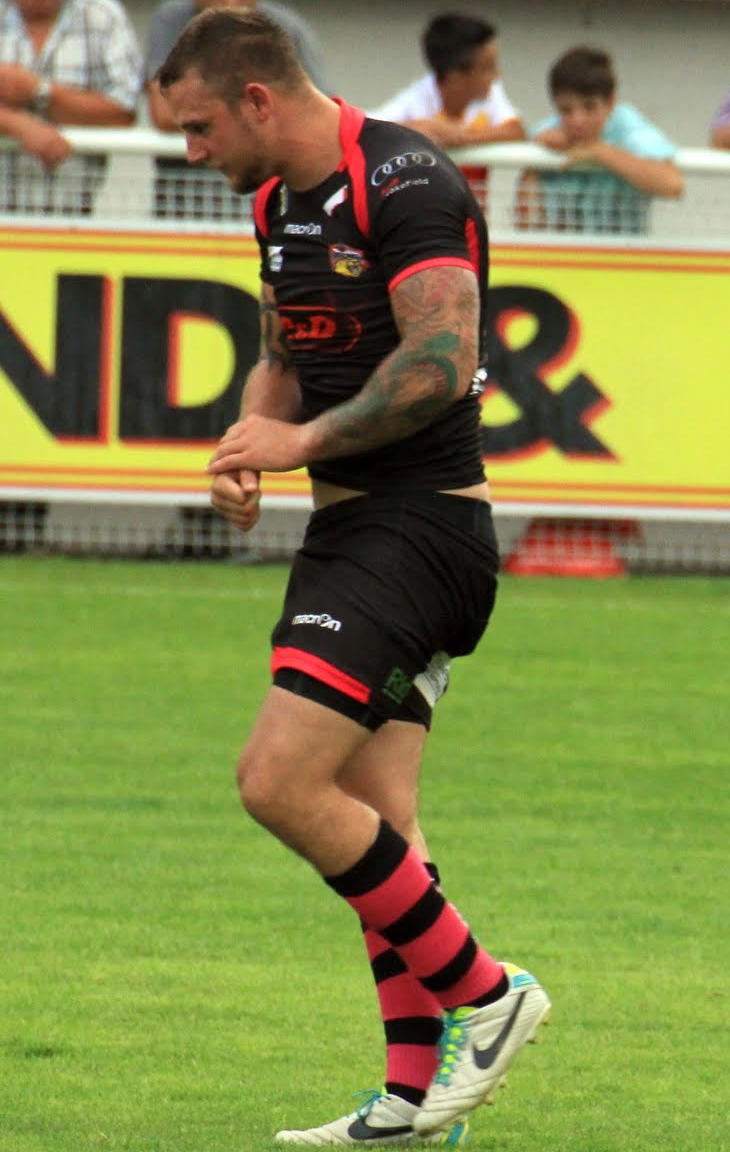

Personal information
- Full name: Richard Owen
- Born: 25 April 1990 (age 36) Normanton, West Yorkshire, England

Playing information
- Height: 6 ft 0 in (1.84 m)
- Weight: 15 st 2 lb (96 kg)
- Position: Fullback, Wing
Club
Years	Team	Pld	T	G	FG	P
2007–14	Castleford Tigers	139	70	0	0	280
2013(loan)	→ Keighley Cougars	1	0	0	0	0
2014(loan)	→ Wakefield Trinity Wildcats	14	6	0	0	24
2014–16	Wakefield Trinity Wildcats	20	5	0	0	20
2016	Leigh Centurions	2	1	0	0	4
2018–19	Doncaster	31	13	0	0	52
	Total	207	95	0	0	380

Richard Owen (born 25 April 1990) is an English former professional rugby league footballer who played as a fullback or on the wing.

He has played for Featherstone Lions ALRFC, Westgate Redoubt ARLFC, Castleford Tigers, Keighley Cougars (loan), Wakefield Trinity Wildcats (two spells, first one on loan), Leigh Centurions and Doncaster in Kingstone Press League 1.

== Background ==
Owen was born in Normanton, West Yorkshire, England.

== Career ==
Owen made an impressive start to his Super League career for Castleford in 2008 - scoring 13 tries in 24 games. Due to the team suffering some key injuries he was moved to the wing and formed a good partnership with Michael Shenton towards the end of that year.

Owen played mainly at full back for the Castleford Tigers in 2009 where he showed some excellent form.

In round three of 2010 Richie suffered a badly broken leg against the Bradford Bulls.

After signing a new two-year deal for the Castleford Tigers in 2010, Owen made a try scoring return for his club in a round eight victory over Hull FC.

In May 2014, Owen joined Wakefield Trinity Wildcats on loan until the end of the season. In October 2014, he joined Wakefield Trinity Wildcats on a permanent deal, signing a three-year contract.

He was a free agent having been released from his contract with the Wakefield Trinity Wildcats by mutual consent in 2016.

== Controversy ==
In 2012 Owen was given a 12 months suspended sentence and ordered to complete 200 hours of community service for affray and actual bodily harm. The charges related to his role in a brawl outside a Pontefract nightclub the previous year. The court heard Owen punched a man dressed as Santa Claus who was rendered unconscious and sustained a fractured jaw as a result.

Owen was remanded in custody between December 2016 and January 2017 on suspicion of three counts of sexual assault, actual bodily harm and theft. He was later cleared of all offences after being found not guilty in May 2017.
