= Ben Johnston (rugby league) =

Ireland international rugby league footballer

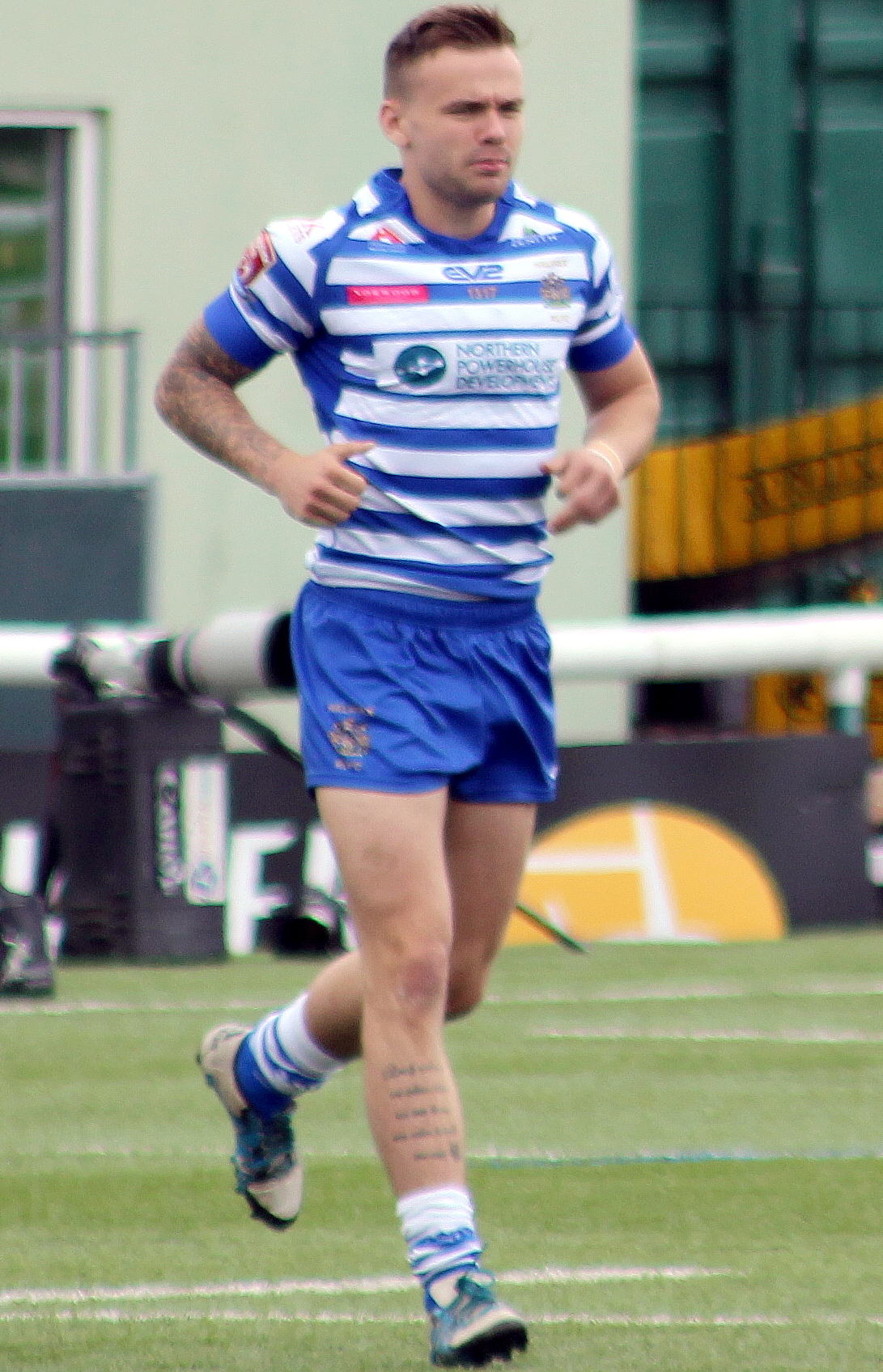

Personal information
- Full name: Ben Johnston
- Born: 8 March 1992 (age 34) York, North Yorkshire, England
- Height: 5 ft 8 in (173 cm)
- Weight: 11 st 7 lb (73 kg)

Playing information
- Position: Fullback, Scrum-half, Stand-off
Club
Years	Team	Pld	T	G	FG	P
2012	Castleford Tigers	2	0	0	0	0
2012–13	York City Knights	17	12	0	0	48
2013(loan)	→ Dewsbury Rams	4	1	0	0	4
2014–19	Halifax RLFC	137	52	0	0	208
2020	York City Knights	5	1	0	0	4
2021–25	Doncaster RLFC	75	35	0	0	140
	Total	240	101	0	0	404
Representative
Years	Team	Pld	T	G	FG	P
2014–15	Ireland	5	0	0	0	0
- Source: As of 30 March 2026

Ben Johnston (born 8 March 1992) is an Ireland international rugby league footballer who last played as a fullback, scrum-half or stand-off for Doncaster in League 1.

He has previously played for the Castleford Tigers in the Super League and the York City Knights in the Championship. Johnston has spent time on loan from York at the Dewsbury Rams in the Championship and spent six seasons with Halifax in the Championship.

== Background ==
Johnston was born in York, Yorkshire, England.

== Club career ==
Johnston made his Super League début for the Castleford Tigers against the London Broncos in 2012.

=== Doncaster RLFC ===
On 17 September 2020 it was reported that he had signed for Doncaster RLFC in the RFL League 1

On 28 September 2025 it was reported that he would leave Doncaster RLFC at the end of the 2025 season

== International ==
In 2014, Ben was a late call-up to Mark Aston's Ireland national rugby league team's squad for the 2014 European Cup tournament. Ben played in 2 of the 3 games available.

In October and November 2015, he appeared for Ireland again in the following year's European Cup competition.
