= 2014 Challenge Cup final =

Rugby league match in the United Kingdom

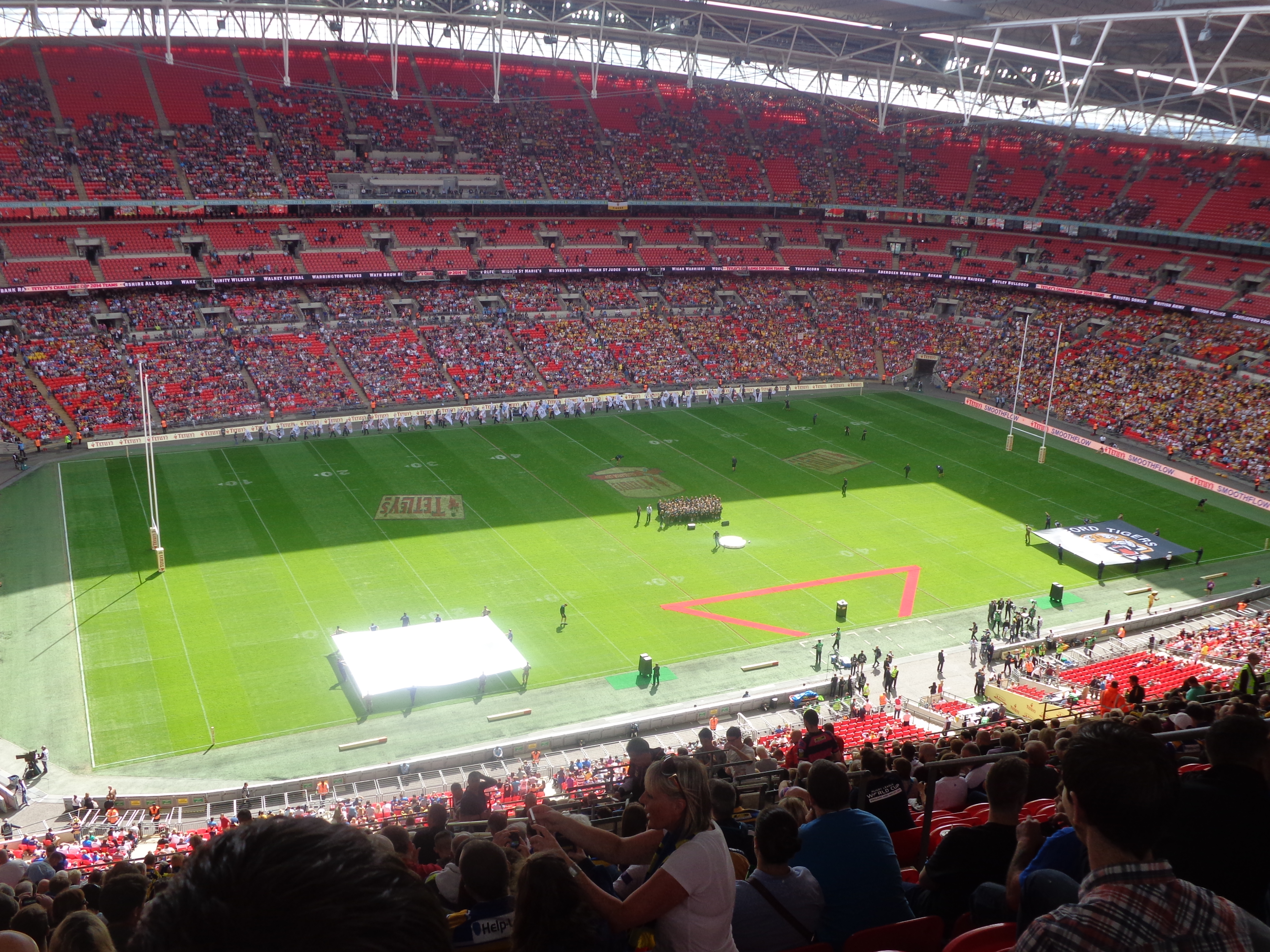
- 2014 Challenge Cup final opening ceremony
Castleford Tigers	Leeds Rhinos
10	23
	1	2	Total
CAS	4	6	10
LEE	16	7	23
- Date: 23 August 2014
- Stadium: Wembley Stadium, London
- Location: London, United Kingdom
- Lance Todd Trophy: Ryan Hall
- God Save The Queen and Abide with Me: Victoria Gray
- Referee: Phil Bentham
- Attendance: 77,914

Broadcast partners
- Broadcasters: BBC One
- Commentators: Dave Woods; Jonathan Davies; Brian Noble

The 2014 Challenge Cup final was the 113th cup-deciding game of the rugby league 2014 Challenge Cup season. It was held at Wembley Stadium in London on 23 August 2014, kick off 15:00. The final was contested by the Castleford Tigers and the Leeds Rhinos. The game saw Leeds beat Castleford by 23 points to 10.

== Background ==
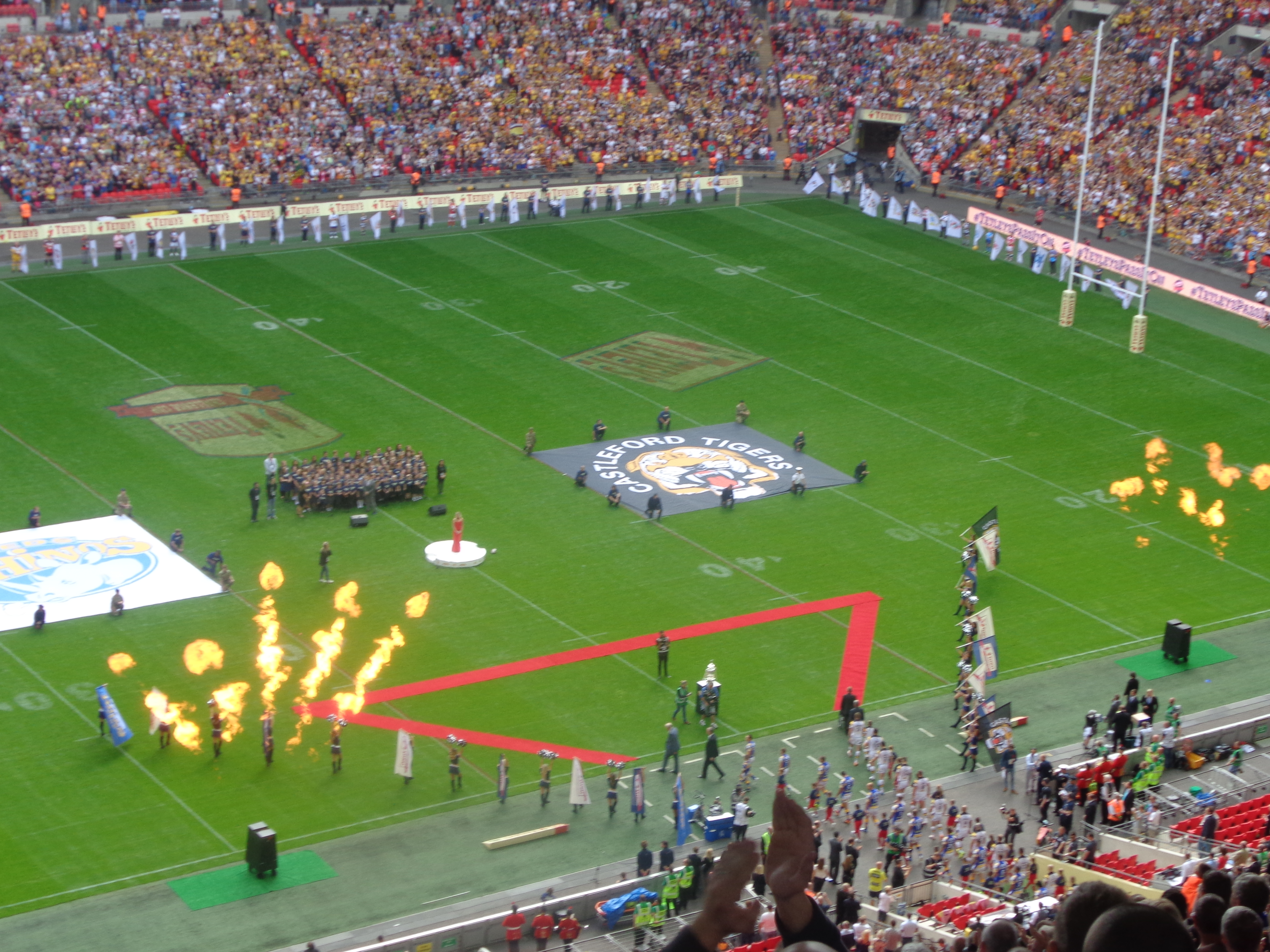
Teams walking out the Wembley tunnel before the game

The 2014 Challenge Cup final would be Castleford Tigers's first cup final of the Super League era, having last featured as runners-up to Wigan Warriors in the 1992 Challenge Cup final. By contrast, their opponents, Leeds Rhinos, have featured in nine Challenge Cup finals during that period since 1992 but only winning one of them: the 1999 Challenge Cup final, the last at the original Wembley Stadium.

== Route to the final ==
=== Castleford Tigers ===
As a 2013 Super League team, Castleford Tigers entered in at the fourth round. They drew Championship side Batley Bulldogs beating them by 48 points to 10. The fifth round saw the Tigers face Championship opposition again, in the form of Sheffield Eagles, who they comfortably beat 60 points to 16. The quarter finals saw them beat eventual Super League runners-up Wigan Warriors 16 points to 4, before a semi-final victory over Widnes Vikings put them in the final.

Round	Opposition	Score
4th	Batley Bulldogs (A)	48–10
5th	Sheffield Eagles (H)	60–16
QF	Wigan Warriors (A)	16–4
SF	Widnes Vikings (N)	26–6

=== Leeds Rhinos ===
As a 2013 Super League team, Leeds Rhinos also entered in at the fourth round. A fourth round thrashing of Wakefield Trinity Wildcats 60 points to 6 placed them in the fifth round where a comfortable victory over eventual Super League champions St Helens, winning by 20 points. The Rhinos faced Championship side Leigh Centurions, beating them 25 points to 12, before beating Warrington Wolves in the semis who'd eventually finish one place above them in the league.

Round	Opposition	Score
4th	Wakefield Trinity (A)	60–6
5th	St Helens (H)	32–12
QF	Leigh Centurions (H)	25–12
SF	Warrington Wolves (N)	24–16

== Match details ==
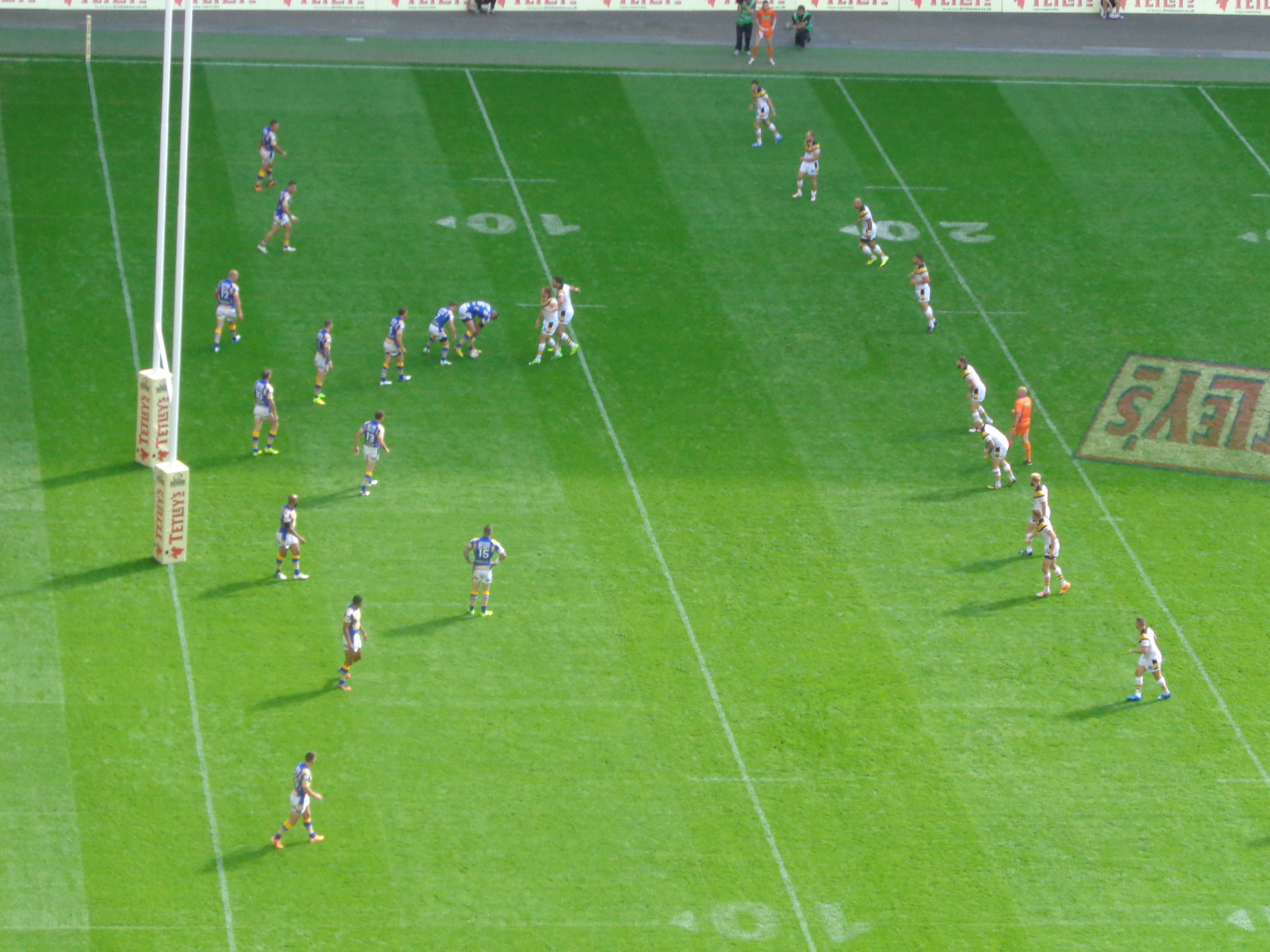
Leeds Rhinos playing-the-ball during the match

Saturday, 24 August
15:00

Castleford Tigers	10 - 23	Leeds Rhinos
Tries; Daryl Clark ('13); Oliver Holmes ('47); Goals; Liam Finn ('47)	Report	Tries; Tom Briscoe ('5); Danny McGuire ('18); Ryan Hall ('25, '67); Goals; Kevin Sinfield ('5, '18, '67); Drop-goals; Danny McGuire ('77)

Wembley Stadium, London
Attendance: 77,914
Referee: (England) Phil Bentham
Player of the Match: (England) Ryan Hall

Castleford Tigers	Posit.		Leeds Rhinos
Luke Dorn	.	.	Zak Hardaker
Kirk Dixon	.	.	Tom Briscoe
Jake Webster	.	.	Kallum Watkins
Michael Shenton	.	.	Joel Moon
Justin Carney	.	.	Ryan Hall
Marc Sneyd	.	.	Kevin Sinfield (c)
Liam Finn	.	.	Danny McGuire
Andy Lynch	.	.	Kylie Leuluai
Daryl Clark	.	.	Rob Burrow
Craig Huby	.	.	Jamie Peacock
Oliver Holmes	.	.	Brett Delaney
Weller Hauraki	.	.	Carl Ablett
Nathan Massey	.	.	Jamie Jones-Buchanan
Frankie Mariano	Int.		Paul Aiton
Scott Wheeldon	Int.		Ryan Bailey
Jamie Ellis	Int.		Ian Kirke
Lee Jewitt	Int.		Liam Sutcliffe
Daryl Powell	Coach		Brian McDermott

== Post match ==
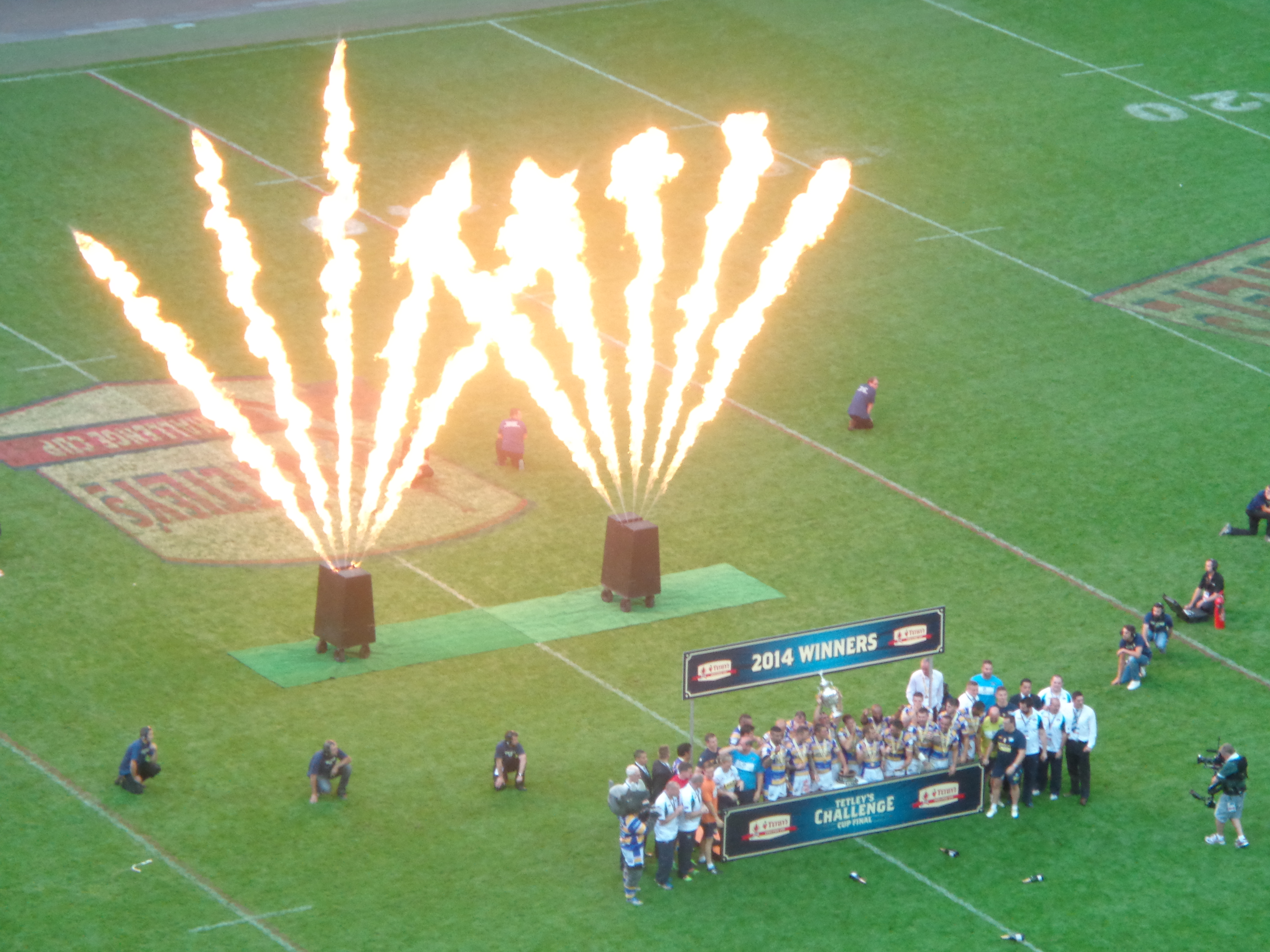
Leeds Rhinos celebrating their victory

Leeds Rhinos won their first Challenge Cup in 15 years, having last won in 1999 and having achieved six runners-up places in that time frame. This marked their twelfth victory in the competition.
