= Ryan Boyle (rugby league) =

Ireland international rugby league footballer

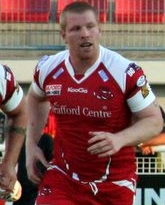

Personal information
- Born: 17 October 1987 (age 38) Leeds, West Yorkshire, England

Playing information
- Height: 6 ft 1 in (185 cm)
- Weight: 16 st 12 lb (107 kg)
- Position: Prop
Club
Years	Team	Pld	T	G	FG	P
2005–09	Castleford Tigers	58	10	1	0	42
2010–13	Salford City Reds	74	3	0	0	12
2013–16	Castleford Tigers	45	3	0	0	12
2016(loan)	→ Halifax	16	1	0	0	4
2017	Halifax	27	0	0	0	0
2018–21	Doncaster	67	4	0	0	16
	Total	287	21	1	0	86
Representative
Years	Team	Pld	T	G	FG	P
2009–10	Ireland	5	1	0	0	4

Ryan Boyle (born 17 October 1987) is an English former professional rugby league footballer who played as a prop forward in the Super League, the RFL Championship and League 1 in the 2000s, 2010s and 2020s. He represented Ireland at international level.

Boyle made over 100 appearances for his hometown club the Castleford Tigers in the Super League and the Championship across two separate spells. He spent three and a half seasons with the Salford City Reds in Super League. He played in the Championship for Halifax, initially on loan from Castleford before signing permanently, then moved to Doncaster in League 1 where he spent four seasons.

== Background ==
Boyle was born in Leeds, Yorkshire, England.

He progressed through the Castleford Tigers academy system.

== Playing career ==
Boyle made his début for Castleford in 2005.

In October 2009, Boyle was selected for the Irish national squad for the European Cup.

Boyle moved to Salford in 2010 but in April 2013 returned to Castleford and in October 2013 he signed a two-year extension to his contract.

At the end of April 2016, it was reported that Boyle had signed for Batley on dual registration, but three weeks later he joined Halifax on a loan deal until the end of the season, in which he made 16 appearances and scored one try. The move was made permanent in October 2016 with a deal for the 2017 season.

In October 2017, Boyle joined Doncaster from Halifax on a two-year deal.

Boyle announced his retirement from rugby league following the conclusion of the 2021 season. He began working as a plumbing and heating engineer.
