= Daryl Powell =

Professional rugby league coach

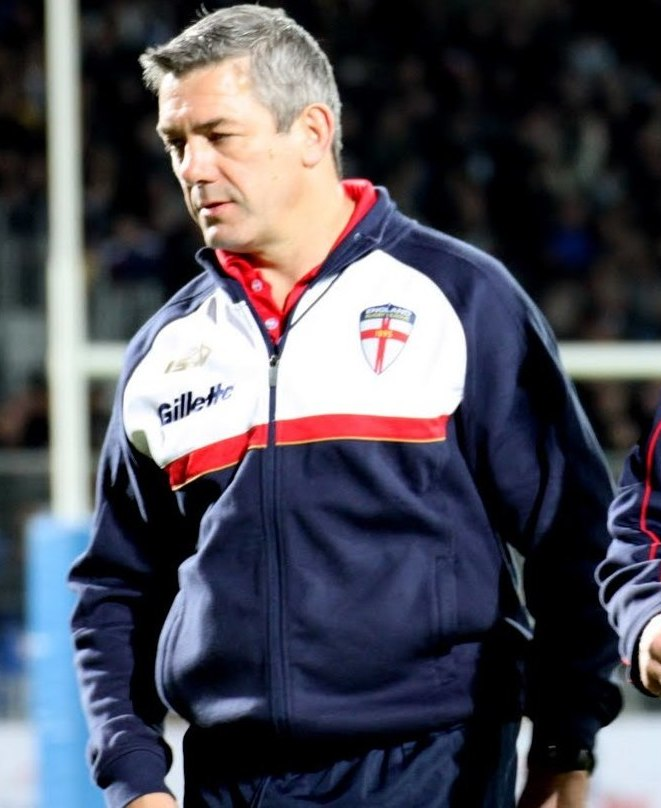

Personal information
- Full name: Daryl Anthony Powell
- Born: 21 July 1965 (age 61) Ackworth, Wakefield, West Yorkshire, England

Playing information
- Position: Centre, Stand-off, Loose forward
Club
Years	Team	Pld	T	G	FG	P
1984–95	Sheffield Eagles	312	114	0	16	472
1988–90	Balmain Tigers	4	2	0	0	8
1991	Gold Coast Seagulls	13	1	0	0	4
1995–97	Keighley Cougars	42	10	0	0	40
1998–01	Leeds Rhinos	89	13	0	2	54
	Total	460	140	0	18	578
Representative
Years	Team	Pld	T	G	FG	P
1989–96	Great Britain	33	5	0	0	20
1995	England	4	0	0	0	0
1989	Yorkshire	1	0	0	0	0

Coaching information

Rugby league
Club
Years	Team	Gms	W	D	L	W%
1996–97	Keighley Cougars	24	14	1	9	58
2001–03	Leeds Rhinos	92	58	4	30	63
2008–13	Featherstone Rovers	137	104	3	30	76
2013–21	Castleford Tigers	219	129	5	85	59
2022–23	Warrington Wolves	50	21	0	29	42
2024–	Wakefield Trinity	98	73	0	25	74
	Total	620	399	13	208	64
Representative
Years	Team	Gms	W	D	L	W%
2004	Ireland	3	2	0	1	67

Rugby union
Club
Years	Team	Gms	W	D	L	W%
2006–08	Leeds Tykes
- Source: As of 3 November 2026

Daryl Anthony Powell (born 21 July 1965) is an English professional rugby league coach who is the head coach of Wakefield Trinity in the Super League and a former professional rugby league footballer.

He played as a stand-off in the 1980s, 1990s and 2000s for the Sheffield Eagles, the Keighley Cougars and the Leeds Rhinos, as well as Balmain Tigers and Gold Coast Seagulls in Australia. He played more than 450 games including 33 caps for Great Britain, and made appearances in the Super League Grand Final and in two Challenge Cup Finals for Leeds. At Sheffield he formed a key partnership with Mark Aston, and holds the club record for the most individual tries in a match (5) and he did hold the record for most career tries (114) until this was broken by Menzie Yere in 2013.

Powell's first move into coaching was with Keighley Cougars as a player-coach. After retiring, he became head coach of the Leeds Rhinos in 2001, and later became their director of rugby. He coached the Ireland national rugby league team as well as rugby union side Leeds Tykes, before a return to domestic rugby league in 2008 with Featherstone Rovers in the Championship who he led to three consecutive first-placed finishes. In 2013, he was appointed head coach of the Castleford Tigers in the Super League where, across nine seasons, he won the League Leaders' Shield and reached three major finals. He coached the Warrington Wolves for two seasons before taking charge of Wakefield Trinity ahead of the 2024 campaign.

== Background ==
Powell was born in Ackworth, Wakefield, West Riding of Yorkshire, England.

== Playing career ==
Powell was selected to go on the 1992 Great Britain Lions tour of Australia and New Zealand. His Testimonial match at Sheffield Eagles took place in 1994. He played for England in the 1995 Rugby League World Cup.

=== Leeds Rhinos ===
Powell played for Leeds at stand-off half in their 1998 Super League Grand Final loss to Wigan. He was a member of the Rhinos' 1999 Challenge Cup winning team. He played stand-off in the final as the Rhinos beat London Broncos 52–16 to claim their first cup win since their back to back successes of 1977 and 1978.

== Coaching career ==
=== Keighley Cougars ===
Powell's first coaching appointment was as player/coach at Keighley where he was appointed at the end of the 1996 season. He was in charge for 24 games before his transfer to Leeds at the end of June 1997 although his tenure as coach at Keighley continued until July 1997. Under his leadership Keighley won 14, lost 9 and drew 1 game.

=== Leeds Rhinos ===
After Powell retired from playing in 2001, he became the head coach of Leeds Rhinos. The Rhinos finished 5th then 4th in his first two seasons.

In his third season in charge, the club reached the 2003 Challenge Cup Final but lost 22–20 to Bradford Bulls. Leeds were top of Super League when it was announced in July 2003 that Powell would be moved into a director of rugby role the following season to make way for Tony Smith. Leeds later exited the play-offs in their first game.

During his tenure as Rhinos coach, he handed debuts to future club legends including Danny McGuire, Rob Burrow, Matt Diskin and Ryan Bailey. He also handed a then 22-year old, Kevin Sinfield, the captaincy. The group would go on to form the nucleus of the clubs famous "Golden generation".

=== Ireland ===
In 2004 Powell was coach for the Ireland national team. He helped to lead the team to the final of the 2004 European Nations Cup where they went down 36–12 to England.

=== Leeds Tykes ===
In July 2005 he made the switch to rugby union when he became the offensive coach and matchday manager for Leeds Tykes. In January 2006 he was promoted to head coach, but the season ended in disappointment when the Tykes were relegated.

=== Featherstone Rovers ===
He was appointed head coach of Featherstone Rovers in September 2008.

He oversaw one of the most successful periods in Featherstone Rovers' history, leading them to three consecutive Championship League Leaders' Shields and Grand Finals between 2010 and 2012. Despite winning the Championship Grand Final in 2011, Featherstone were not promoted to super league due to the controversial licensing system in place at the time. Subsequently, Powell continued to ply his trade in the second tier in 2012. In addition to again, leading the club to the 2012 league leaders shield and grand final, Powell also masterminded a famous victory over Super League side and local rivals Castleford in the Challenge Cup in what would prove to be his final season at the club.

=== Castleford Tigers ===
On 7 May 2013, Powell was announced as the new head coach of struggling Super League side Castleford Tigers.

Powell was awarded the Coach of the Year award for 2014, after getting the club to their first Wembley appearance for twenty years and their highest league position since Super League began. He coached the club to the 2014 Challenge Cup Final defeat by the Leeds Rhinos at Wembley Stadium.

Powell oversaw arguably one of Castleford's greatest ever seasons in 2017 when they won the League Leaders' Shield by topping the table for the first time in their history. Despite finishing first in the regular season by a record margin, a first top flight title continued to allude Powell as the Tigers were defeated in the 2017 Super League Grand Final by the Leeds Rhinos at Old Trafford.

=== Warrington Wolves ===
On 19 March 2021, before the start of the delayed 2021 season, it was announced that Powell would leave Castleford Tigers at the end of the campaign, with early rumours linking him to Warrington Wolves, whose Head Coach Steve Price had also announced he would be leaving at the end of the 2021 campaign. Daryl Powell was announced as Warrington Wolves coach on 6 April 2021, taking over at the start of the 2022 season.

On 30 July 2023, an official statement from Warrington confirmed, that Powell (alongside assistant coach Ryan Sheridan), had left the club by mutual consent, after losing a 6th consecutive game to bottom-placed Wakefield Trinity.

=== Wakefield Trinity and Super League Triumph ===
On 24 September 2023, it was announced that Powell would take over as head coach on a four-year deal following Wakefield's relegation from Super League.

On 8 June 2024, Powell led the club to victory in the RFL 1895 Cup at Wembley Stadium defeating Sheffield Eagles 50-6. Wakefield would then go on to claim the league leaders shield having lost only one match throughout the regular season. The club would reach the 2024 RFL Championship grand final where they defeated Toulouse Olympique 36-0. In the 2025 Super League season, Powell guided Wakefield to a 6th placed finish on the table which saw the club qualify for the playoffs for the first time in 13 years. Wakefield would be defeated in the elimination playoff by Leigh.

In 2026, Powell lead Trinity to an improved 4th placed finish in the league table, (19 wins, 0 draws, 8 losses, 38 points). This qualified Trinity for a home playoff tie against Leigh Leopards, whom they defeated 26-16. This win pitted Trinity against Wigan Warriors whom they convincingly defeated by a score of 33-6, qualifying for the club's first ever Super League Grand Final. Powell then guided Trinity to a masterful 23-10 victory over his former club Warrington Wolves in the 2026 Super League Grand Final. Wakefield's 2026 Super League title was the club's first British rugby league title since 1967-68, and the third in the club's history. This title was widely considered a major surprise, with bookmaker William Hill admitting that a Wakefield Super League triumph would net five figure losses.
