= 2012 Castleford Tigers season =

- Super League XVII Rank: 13th
- Play-off result: N/A
- Challenge Cup: 4th Round
- 2012 record: Wins: 6; draws: 0; losses: 22
- Points scored: For: 536; against: 941

Team information
- Chairman: Jack Fulton
- Head coach: Ian Millward
- Captain: Danny Orr
- Stadium: The Jungle
- Avg. attendance: N/A
- High attendance: 9,786 vs. Wakefield Trinity Wildcats

Top scorers
- Tries: Nick Youngquest – 17
- Goals: Kirk Dixon – 39
- Points: Kirk Dixon – 90
← 2011	List of seasons	2013 →

This article details the Castleford Tigers rugby league football club's 2012 season. This is the seventeenth season of the Super League era.

== Season review ==
March 2011

Castleford Tigers started planning for 2012 with the re-signing of the Tigers' longest serving player Craig Huby. In March he put pen to paper on 3-year extension with the club, taking him past 10 years service. Also in August the RFL granted from May 2012 a testimonial year for Craig Huby.

July 2011

Castleford confirmed Head Coach Terry Matterson would be leaving the club at the end of the 2011 season after being at the club for 6 years. On the same day, Cas confirmed that goal kicking Winger / centre Kirk Dixon put pen to paper on 3-year extension which would see him at the club until the end of 2014 season. In the same week, Cas also signed new deals with Half back Danny Orr who added a 1-year extension with the club and former England Academy International Centre / Second Row Jordan Thompson who signed a new 2-year deal that would see him at the Tigers until the end of the 2013 season.

August 2011

Cas signed Second Row Stuart Jones on a new 1-year deal with the club. Also following Jones in signing a new 1-year deal was Scottish international Prop Forward Paul Jackson. On the same day as Jackson's new deal, he was joined by USA International and former Castleford Academy prop Nathan Massey who signed a new 2-year extension with the club. However, fans favourite Dean Widders announced he will be retiring from the game of rugby league and return home to Australia to take up a Community Coaching Role with NRL side Gold Coast Titans alongside fellow Australian Indigenous player Preston Campbell.

September 2011

Castleford announced the signing of Leigh Centurions Head Coach Ian Millward as the replacement of Tigers Head Coach Terry Matterson. Millward took St Helens R.F.C. to 2 Super League Grand Final wins and 2 Challenge Cup Final wins along with 1 World Club Challenge win in his 5 years at Saints. However, in September, Castleford's Samoan International Centre Willie Isa announced he would be joining Super League newcomers Widnes Vikings on a 2-year deal. Then, a few days after, young Tigers utility back Greg Eden confirmed signing a new 2-year deal with Castleford's local rivals Huddersfield Giants. The club also confirmed that Assistant Coach Andy Hay would be leaving the club at the end of the season, and a few weeks later Hull F.C. confirmed Andy Hay as one of their 2 new assistant coaches. On 27 September, Castleford called a press conference to announce the signing of a new and improved deal for the 2011 Man of Steel and 2011 Albert Goldthorpe Medal winning England International player Rangi Chase; his new extension would see him at the club until the end of 2015. Ian Millward confirmed his first new signing of the 2012 season was Centre / winger Josh Griffin from Wakefield Trinity Wildcats on a 1-year deal and on the same day Richard Owen signed a new 4-year deal with the club that would see him stay until the end of 2015 season.

October 2011

At a 'Meet the Coach' club event, Millward confirmed the signing of Leigh Centurions prop Stephen Nash on a two-year deal. Cas confirmed a few changes to the club's backroom staff with long serving physiotherapist Russell Jones to leave the club after 11 years. Shortly after this, Millward signed two new backroom staff for the club: new Athletic Performance Director James Parkes, who is a former rugby union footballer for Leeds Carnegie, and new Head of Physiotherapy Ben Stirling, who was the Head Physio of Wales Rugby League. Tigers Hooker and former England Academy Captain Adam Milner signed a new three-year extension with the club. Castleford handed three Academy players (prop Charlie Martin, winger James Clare & half-back Ben Johnson) full-time contracts. Castleford also announced a new five-year deal for hooker Daryl Clark.

November 2011

Castleford confirmed the release of former Great Britain International Prop Nick Fozzard & former England International Winger Martin Aspinwall who later went on to join Super League side Hull F.C. on a 1-year deal. A few weeks after, Dewsbury Rams announced the signing of Fozzard. Tigers Academy Second Row Billy Harris also joined Dewsbury on a season long loan to gain some first team experience, in addition to his Academy teammate Academy James Clare who joined the Rams on a dual-contract loan for the 2012 season. Ryan Brierley would also go out on a dual-contract loan with Leigh Centurions. Millward confirmed his Assistant Coach as ex-Castleford fullback Stuart Donlan on a 3-year deal with the club. The Tigers confirmed the signing of Canterbury Bulldogs Second Row / Prop Grant Millington, and also the season long loan signing of Warrington Wolves Second Row Lee Mitchell for the 2012 season with the option of making the deal permanent for 2013 season. Tigers Second Row Oliver Holmes signed a new 3-year deal, following in the footsteps of fellow Tigers Academy graduates Owen, Milner, Clark, Huby and Thompson in signing new long-term deals with the club.

December 2011

Castleford confirmed that Tigers fullback Richard Mathers would be joining local rivals Wakefield Trinity Wildcats on a season long loan. Castleford beat the Bradford Bulls in the annual Boxing Day friendly; Josh Griffin and Josh Atkinson both scored 2 tries each with Stephen Nash and Ben Johnson also scoring. Griffin and Jordan Thompson rounded up the 28–18 win with a conversion each.

January 2012

Castleford beat local rivals Huddersfield Giants in their 2nd pre-season friendly, with tries from Ryan Hudson, Danny Orr, Oliver Holmes, Lee Mitchell, Rangi Chase and Daryl Clark plus 3 goals from Kirk Dixon and 1 from Ryan Shaw securing Ian Millward's team a well deserved 32–22 win. The Tigers lost to arch-rivals Wakefield Trinity Wildcats 40–20 at Belle Vue; Brett Ferres, Stuart Jones, Lee Mitchell and Stephen Nash all scored for the Tigers whilst Kirk Dixon kicked 2 goals. Castleford announced that Danny Orr will be captain for 2012.

February 2012

The Tigers beat Salford City Reds 24–10 in Round 1, Castleford's tries came from Richard Owen who scored 2, Josh Griffin and hooker Adam Milner. Kirk Dixon kicked all 4 goals. The Tigers put up a good fight against an excellent Bradford Bulls side but lost 20–12. Owen scored a try and so did winger Griffin, and Dixon kicked both goals. Castleford travelled to the south of France to face the Catalans Dragons - although the Tigers played well and took an early lead, they eventually succumbed to a good fightback and lost 28–20 with Griffin getting a hat-trick and Joe Arundel scoring. Dixon added 2 goals. Challenge Cup holders Wigan Warriors demolished Castleford 46–4 at The Jungle; Griffin crossed for the Tigers' only try and Dixon missed the conversion.

March 2012

Castleford started off March with a 36–14 loss to champions Leeds Rhinos, Daryl Clark, Kirk Dixon and Josh Griffin all scored a try whilst Dixon kicked a goal. The Tigers lost to re-branded London Broncos 42–16 with Dixon, Ryan McGoldrick and Nick Youngquest all scoring with Dixon kicking 2 goals. The Tigers were once again well beaten by a well drilled Huddersfield Giants, Youngquest's try could not prevent a 42–4 loss. Castleford's losing streak continues with a 42–28 loss to Hull F.C. with Griffin, Youngquest, Jonathan Walker, Grant Millington and Brett Ferres all scoring a try with Dixon kicking 4 goals. Castleford managed to scrape a 34–30 win against Hull Kingston Rovers with Griffin, Youngquest (2), Richard Owen, Dixon and Danny Orr scoring tries while Dixon kicked 5 goals.

April 2012

Castleford beat local rivals Wakefield Trinity Wildcats 34–16 with Richard Owen scoring 2 tries and Grant Millington, Steve Snitch, Brett Ferres and Oliver Holmes scoring. Kirk Dixon also kicked 5 goals. However, on the Monday Castleford narrowly lost out to St. Helens 18–12. Ferres grabbed 2 tries and Dixon kicked both conversions. The Tigers suffered an early cup exit to local rivals Featherstone Rovers, the Championship side showed grit and determination to beat the Tigers 23–16 with Daryl Clark, Josh Griffin and Nick Youngquest scoring for Castleford and Dixon added a conversion, returning Danny Orr also kicked a goal. Castleford suffered another heavy defeat, this time at the hands of Warrington Wolves who won 54–6, Lee Mitchell scored for the Tigers and Orr converted.

May 2012

Centre James Grehan was sent out on a months loan to championship side Batley Bulldogs. Castleford gained another 2 points in a hard-fought contest with Widnes Vikings with the Tigers coming out 36–12 winners, Brett Ferres and Jordan Thompson grabbed a try whilst Daryl Clark scored 2 and Nick Youngquest scored a hat-trick. Danny Orr kicked 2 goals, Craig Huby kicked a goal and Josh Griffin also kicked a conversion. Castleford were humiliated at Craven Park by losing 70–12 against Hull Kingston Rovers with Grffin and Thompson scoring and Dixon kicking both goals. Castleford announce a 1-month loan deal for winger Rhys Williams from Warrington Wolves. The Tigers lose at the Magic Weekend to local rivals Wakefield Trinity Wildcats 32–26. Thompson, Stuart Jones, Oliver Holmes, Youngquest and Orr all scored tries for Castleford and Dixon kicked 2 goals whilst Orr converted his own try. Centre Joe Arundel signs a 4-year deal with Hull FC.

June 2012

Castleford started June with a 46–32 loss to Bradford Bulls, Jordan Thompson and Nathan Massey both scored tries whilst Rangi Chase and Rhys Williams scored 2 each, Kirk Dixon kicked 4 goals. The Tigers announce that Michael Shenton will be returning to the club on a 4 Year Deal in 2013. The Tigers beat playoff contenders Salford City Reds 34–30 with a try in the final minute to snatch a victory, tries from Nick Youngquest, Jordan Thompson and a hat-trick from Danny Orr helped the Tigers get into a good position before Craig Huby scored the winning try for Castleford. Dixon kicked 3 goals while Huby and Orr also kicked a goal each. Hooker Daryl Clark place a transfer request which was rejected by the board at the Tigers. Castleford went down 40–22 against Super League champions Leeds Rhinos, Paul Jackson scored for his 1st try of the year whilst Huby grabbed a try and centre Brett Ferres scored 2. Orr, Huby and Ryan McGoldrick all kicked a goal each.

July 2012

Castleford announce that Huddersfield Giants forward Lee Gilmour has signed for the Tigers for 2 years starting in 2013. The Tigers were heavily beaten 40–10 against Widnes Vikings with Nick Youngquest and Stuart Jones crossing for tries and Craig Huby kicked a goal. Castleford announce that Ryan McGoldrick will be leaving the club immediately after handing in a transfer request, he will move to Hull F.C. on a 1 1/2-year deal whilst young scrum half Jamie Ellis has been signed for the Tigers after being released from Hull FC. Castleford destroyed local rivals Huddersfield Giants 52–6 in what is their biggest winning margin in the Super League. Richard Owen scored 2 tries whilst James Clare, Jordan Thompson, Nick Youngquest, Josh Griffin, Adam Milner and Jamie Ellis (on debut) each scored a try each with Ellis kicking 10 goals. Castleford lost 40–26 to Warrington Wolves in Round 21 with Youngquest scoring 2 tries, Rhys Williams, Owen and Lee Mitchell all scored as well. Ellis kicked a goal and the retiring Danny Orr kicked 2 goals. Brett Ferres left the club with immediate effect and joined Huddersfield Giants. The Tigers were beaten 40–16 by leaders Wigan Warriors with Williams, Stuart Jones and Oliver Holmes all scoring, Youngquest kicked 2 goals.

August 2012

August started with a 40–12 loss to rivals Wakefield Trinity Wildcats. Paul Jackson and top try scorer Nick Youngquest both scored a try each and Danny Orr kicked 2 goals. Castleford lost to London Broncos 42–20, Adam Milner and Danny Orr both scored a try each whilst Josh Griffin scored 2 and Jamie Ellis kicked 2 goals. Castleford also suffered defeat at the hands of St. Helens by the score of 44–12, Jackson and Steve Snitch provide the Tiger's tries whilst Orr converted both.

September 2012

September started off awful with the Tigers losing their last home game 46–26 to Catalans Dragons. Ryan Hudson, Stuart Jones, Nick Youngquest, Grant Millington and Richard Owen all scored for Castleford whilst Danny Orr kicked 3 goals. Castleford would once again miss out on the playoffs after a poor 2012 season. Castleford wrapped up the season with a 36–10 loss to Hull FC, Jordan Thompson and Oliver Holmes scored whilst Danny Orr kicked his last ever Super League goal.

== Pre season friendlies ==
LEGEND
Win
Draw
Loss

Tigers score is first.

Date	Competition	Vrs	H/A	Venue	Result	Score	Tries	Goals	Att	Report
26 December 2011	Pre Season	Bradford Bulls	H	The Jungle	W	28–18	Griffin (2), Atkinson (2), Johnson, Nash	Griffin 1/5, Thompson 1/1	3,296	Report
13 January 2012	Pre Season	Huddersfield Giants	H	The Jungle	W	32–22	Hudson, Orr, Holmes, Mitchell, Chase, Clark	Dixon 3/5, Shaw 1/1	2,542	Report
22 January 2012	Pre Season	Wakefield Trinity Wildcats	A	Belle Vue	L	20–40	Ferres, Jones, Mitchell, Nash	Dixon 2/4	2,200	Report

== Player appearances – Friendlies ==
(in order of appearance)

FB=Fullback	C=Centre	W=Winger	SO=Stand Off	SH=Scrum half	P=Prop	H=Hooker	SR=Second Row	LF=Loose forward	B=Bench

No	Player	1	2	3
1	Richard Owen	x	B	FB
2	Nick Youngquest	x	x	x
3	Joe Arundel	x	C	C
4	Kirk Dixon	x	W	W
5	Josh Griffin	C	C	C
6	Rangi Chase	x	SO	SO
7	Danny Orr	x	SH	SH
8	Jake Emmitt	x	B	P
9	Daryl Clark	B	B	B
10	Craig Huby	x	x	x
11	Brett Ferres	x	x	SR
12	Jonathan Walker	x	x	x
13	Steve Snitch	B	SR	x
14	Stuart Jones	LF	LF	B
15	Adam Milner	H	B	B
16	Ryan Hudson	x	H	H
17	Lee Mitchell	x	SR	B
18	Cas Fans		x	x
19	Paul Jackson	x	x	x
20	Grant Millington	x	x	x
21	Oliver Holmes	SR	x	SR
22	Nathan Massey	P	P	x
23	Ryan McGoldrick	SO	FB	L
24	Stephen Nash	P	P	P
25	Jordan Thompson	C	B	B
26	James Clare	FB	W	B
27	John Davies	x	B	B
28	Name	x	x	x
29	Name	x	x	x
30	Name	x	x	x
31	Name	x	x	x
32	Name	x	x	x
33	Name	x	x	x

= Injured

= Suspended

== Table ==
Super League XVII
Pos	Team	Pld	W	D	L	PF	PA	PD	Pts	Qualification
1	Wigan Warriors (L)	27	21	0	6	994	449	+545	42	Play-offs
2	Warrington Wolves	27	20	1	6	909	539	+370	41	Play-offs
3	St Helens	27	17	2	8	795	480	+315	36	Play-offs
4	Catalans Dragons	27	18	0	9	812	611	+201	36	Play-offs
5	Leeds Rhinos (C)	27	16	0	11	823	662	+161	32	Play-offs
6	Hull F.C.	27	15	2	10	696	621	+75	32	Play-offs
7	Huddersfield Giants	27	14	0	13	699	664	+35	28	Play-offs
8	Wakefield Trinity Wildcats	27	13	0	14	633	764	−131	26	Play-offs
9	Bradford Bulls	27	14	1	12	633	756	−123	23 (Note: Bradford Bulls deducted 6 points on 25 July 2012 for entering administration)	
10	Hull Kingston Rovers	27	10	1	16	753	729	+24	21	
11	Salford City Reds	27	8	1	18	618	844	−226	17	
12	London Broncos	27	7	0	20	588	890	−302	14	
13	Castleford Tigers	27	6	0	21	554	948	−394	12	
14	Widnes Vikings	27	6	0	21	532	1082	−550	12	

Source: superleague.co.uk and BBC Sport.
Rules for classification: 1st on competition points; 2nd on match points difference.
Competition points: for win = 2; for draw = 1; for loss = 0.
(C) Champions; (L) League Leaders' Shield Winners

== 2012 fixtures and results ==
LEGEND
Win
Draw
Loss

2012 Engage Super League

Date	Competition	Rnd	Vrs	H/A	Venue	Result	Score	Tries	Goals	Att	Live on TV	Report
4 February 2012	Super League XVII	1	Salford City Reds	A	City of Salford Stadium	W	24–10	Owen (2), Griffin, Milner	Dixon 4/4	5,242	Sky Sports	Report
12 February 2012	Super League XVII	2	Bulls	H	The Jungle	L	12–20	Griffin, Owen	Dixon 2/2	8,054	–	Report
18 February 2012	Super League XVII	3	Dragons	A	Stade Gilbert Brutus	L	20–28	Griffin (3), Arundel	Dixon 2/4	7,488	–	Report
26 February 2012	Super League XVII	4	Warriors	H	The Jungle	L	4–46	Griffin	Dixon 0/1	8,156	–	Report
2 March 2012	Super League XVII	5	Rhinos	H	The Jungle	L	14–36	Clark, Griffin, Dixon	Dixon 1/3	9,237	Sky Sports	Report
10 March 2012	Super League XVII	6	Broncos	A	Twickenham Stoop	L	16–42	Youngquest, Dixon, McGoldrick	Dixon 2/3	2,381	–	Report
16 March 2012	Super League XVII	7	Giants	A	Galpharm Stadium	L	4–42	Youngquest	Dixon 0/1	6,928	Sky Sports	Report
25 March 2012	Super League XVII	8	Hull FC	H	The Jungle	L	28–42	Youngquest, Walker, Millington, Griffin, Ferres	Dixon 4/5	9,050	–	Report
30 March 2012	Super League XVII	9	Hull Kingston Rovers	H	The Jungle	W	34–30	Griffin, Youngquest (2), Owen, Dixon, Orr	Dixon 5/6	6,396	–	Report
6 April 2012	Super League XVII	10	Wakefield Trinity Wildcats	A	Belle Vue	W	34–16	Owen (2), Millington, Snitch, Ferres, Holmes	Dixon 5/6	9,786	–	Report
9 April 2012	Super League XVII	11	Saints	H	The Jungle	L	12–18	Ferres (2)	Dixon 2/2	6,492	–	Report
22 April 2012	Super League XVII	12	Wolves	A	Halliwell Jones Stadium	L	6–54	Mitchell	Orr 1/1	Attendance	–	Report
7 May 2012	Super League XVII	13	Vikings	H	The Jungle	W	36–12	Ferres, Clark (2), Thompson, Youngquest (3)	Orr 2/3, Huby 1/1, Dixon 0/2, Griffin 1/1	5,580	Sky Sports	Report
20 May 2012	Super League XVII	14	Hull Kingston Rovers	A	Craven Park	L	12–70	Thompson, Griffin	Dixon 2/2	7,312	–	Report
26 May 2012	Super League XVII	15	Wakefield Trinity Wildcats	N	Etihad Stadium	L	26–32	Thompson, Jones, Youngquest, Holmes, Orr	Dixon 2/4, Orr 1/1	30,763	Sky Sports	Report
4 June 2012	Super League XVII	16	Bulls	A	Odsal Stadium	L	32–46	Thompson, Chase (2), Massey, Williams (2)	Dixon 4/6	10,906	Sky Sports	Report
10 June 2012	Super League XVII	17	Salford City Reds	H	The Jungle	W	34–30	Youngquest, Orr (3), Thompson, Huby	Dixon 3/4, Orr 1/1, Huby 1/1	4,877	–	Report
24 June 2012	Super League XVII	18	Rhinos	A	Headingley Stadium	L	22–40	Jackson, Huby, Ferres (2)	Orr 1/2, Huby 1/1, McGoldrick 1/1	16,153	–	Report
1 July 2012	Super League XVII	19	Vikings	A	Halton Stadium	L	10–40	Youngquest, Jones	Huby 1/2	4,501	Sky Sports	Report
8 July 2012	Super League XVII	20	Giants	H	The Jungle	W	52–6	Clare, Thompson, Youngquest, Owen (2), Griffin, Milner, Ellis	Ellis 10/10	5,012	–	Report
22 July 2012	Super League XVII	21	Wolves	H	The Jungle	L	26–40	Youngquest (2), Williams, Owen, Mitchell	Ellis 1/3, Orr 2/2	6,167	–	Report
27 July 2012	Super League XVII	22	Warriors	A	DW Stadium	L	16–40	Williams, Holmes, Jones	Youngquest 2/3	13,975	–	Report
5 August 2012	Super League XVII	23	Wakefield Trinity Wildcats	H	The Jungle	L	12–40	Jackson, Youngquest	Orr 2/2	7,050	–	Report
12 August 2012	Super League XVII	24	Broncos	H	The Jungle	L	20–42	Milner, Orr, Griffin (2)	Ellis 2/4	5,149	–	Report
17 August 2012	Super League XVII	25	Saints	A	Langtree Park	L	12–44	Jackson, Snitch	Orr 2/2	12,224	–	Report
2 September 2012	Super League XVII	26	Dragons	H	The Jungle	L	26–46	Hudson, Jones, Youngquest, Millington, Owen	Orr 3/5	5,005	–	Report
9 September 2012	Super League XVII	27	Hull FC	A	KC Stadium	L	10–36	Thompson, Holmes	Orr 1/2	11,607	–	Report

== Player appearances – Super League ==
FB=Fullback	C=Centre	W=Winger	SO=Stand-off	SH=Scrum half	PR=Prop	H=Hooker	SR=Second Row	L=Loose forward	B=Bench

No	Player	1	2	3	4	5	6	7	8	9	10	11	12	13	14	15	16	17	18	19	20	21	22	23	24	25	26	27
1	Richard Owen	FB	FB	FB	FB	FB	FB	FB	FB	FB	FB			FB	FB	FB		FB	W	x	FB	FB	FB	FB	FB	FB	FB	FB
2	Nick Youngquest				W	W	W	W	W	W	W		FB	W	W	W	FB	W	FB	FB	W	W	W	W	W	W	W	W
3	Joe Arundel	C	C	C				C																		x	x	x
4	Kirk Dixon	W	W	W	C	C	C	C	C	C	C	FB		C	C	C	C	C								x	x	x
5	Josh Griffin	W	W	W	W	W	W		W	W	W	W	W	W	W		W	x	x	C	C	C		C	C	C	x	x
6	Rangi Chase	SO	SO	SO	SO	SO	SO	SH	SO	SO	SO	x	Red card	Red card	Red card	SO	SO	SO	x	x	x	SO			x	x	SO	SO
7	Danny Orr	SH	SH	SH	SH	SH	SH		SH	SH	SH	x	SH	SH	x	SH	SH	SH	SH	B	SO	B	SH	SO	H	SO	H	SH
8	Jake Emmitt	P	P	B	P	P	P	B	L	L	L	B	L	B	B		x	B	L	B	L	L	L	L	B	P	x	B
9	Daryl Clark	B	B	H	B	B	B	B	x	H	H		B	B	B			x	x	x	x	x	x	x	x	x	B	H
10	Craig Huby											x	B	P	P	P	P	P	P	P	P	P	P	P	P	P	P	P
11	Brett Ferres	B	B	SR	x	SR	Red card	SR	SR	SR	C	C	C	C	SO	SR	SR	SR	C	SO	x	x	x	x	x	x	x	x
12	Jonathan Walker	SR	P				B	P	P	P	P	P	P	B	B	B	B	P	B	P				x	x	x	x	B
13	Steve Snitch	x	x	B	B	B	B	L	B	B	SR	B					x	x	B	L	SR	SR	SR	SR	C	C	C	C
14	Stuart Jones	L	L	L	L	L	L		B	B	B	B	B	L	L	H	H	L	B	B	B	B	C	B	SR	SR	C	x
15	Adam Milner	H	H	H	H	H	H	x	x	x	x	SH	H	x	SH	B	x	H	H	H	H	H	H	SH	L	B	L	B
16	Ryan Hudson	x	x	x	x	x	x	H	H	x	x	H	x	H	H		x	x	x	x	B	x	B	H	B	H	SR	L
17	Lee Mitchell	SR	SR	B	SR	B	SR	B	x	C	B	SR	SR	SR	SR	L	L	x	x	x	B	B	B	B	SR	L	B	B
18	Cas Fans	x	x	x	x	x	x	x	x	x	x	x	x	x	x	x	x	x	x	x	x	x	x	x	x	x	x	x
19	Paul Jackson													P	P	B	x	x	x	x	P	P	P	P	x	B	x	x
20	Grant Millington	x	x	x	x	P	P	P	B	B	B	x	B	SR	SR	B	B	SR	SR	SR	SR	SR	SR	SR	P	SR	SR	SR
21	Oliver Holmes	B	SR	SR	SR	SR	SR	x	SR	SR	SR	SR	SR	x	B	SR	SR	B	SR	SR	x	x	SO	x	B	B	B	SR
22	Nathan Massey	B	B	P	B	B	B	B	P	P	P	x	P	P	P	B	B	B	B	B	B	B	B	B	B	B	P	P
23	Ryan McGoldrick	C	C	C	C	C	C	SO	B	B	C	SO	SO	SO		x	B	B	SO	SH	x	x	x	x	x	x	x	x
24	Stephen Nash	P	B	P	P	x	x	x	x	x	x	P	x	x	x	x	x	x	x	x	x	x	B	x	x	x	B	x
25	Jordan Thompson	x	x	x	x	x	x	x	x	x	x	C	C	B	C	C	C	C	C	C	C	C	C	C	W	C	W	C
26	James Clare	x	x	x	x	x	x	W	x	x	x	x	x	x	x	x	x	x	x	W	W	x	x	x	x	x	x	x
27	John Davies	x	x	x	x	x	x	x	x	x	x	L	x	x	x	x	x	x	x	x	x	x	x	x	x	x	x	x
28	James Grehan	x	x	x	B	x	x	SR	C	x	x	B	x	x	x	x	x	x	x	x	x	x	x	x	x	x	x	x
29	Josh Atkinson	x	x	x	x	x	x	x	x	x	x	W	W	x	x	x	x	x	x	x	x	x	x	x	x	x	x	x
30	Ben Johnson	x	x	x	x	x	x	x	x	x	x	x	x	x	x	x	x	x	x	x	x	x	x	x	SO	SH	x	x
31	Ben Blackmore	x	x	x	x	x	x	x	x	x	x	x	x	x	x	x	x	x	x	x	x	x	x	x	x	x	x	W
32	Rhys Williams	x	x	x	x	x	x	x	x	x	x	x	x	x	x	W	W	W	W	W	x	W	W	W	x	x	x	x
33	Jamie Ellis	x	x	x	x	x	x	x	x	x	x	x	x	x	x	x	x	x	x	x	SH	SH		B	SH	x	SH	x

= Injured

= Suspended

== Challenge Cup ==
LEGEND
Win
Draw
Loss

Date	Competition	Rnd	Vrs	H/A	Venue	Result	Score	Tries	Goals	Att	TV	Report
14 April 2012	Cup	4th	Rovers	A	Post Office Road	L	16–23	Clark, Griffin, Youngquest	Dixon 1/2, Orr 1/1	4,165	Sky Sports	Report

== Player appearances ==
- Challenge Cup Games only

FB=Fullback	C=Centre	W=Winger	SO=Stand Off	SH=Scrum half	PR=Prop	H=Hooker	SR=Second Row	L=Loose forward	B=Bench

No	Player	4
1	Richard Owen	FB
2	Nick Youngquest	W
3	Joe Arundel	
4	Kirk Dixon	C
5	Josh Griffin	W
6	Rangi Chase	SO
7	Danny Orr	SH
8	Jake Emmitt	L
9	Daryl Clark	H
10	Craig Huby	B
11	Brett Ferres	C
12	Jonathan Walker	P
13	Steve Snitch	SR
14	Stuart Jones	B
15	Adam Milner	x
16	Ryan Hudson	x
17	Lee Mitchell	x
18	Cas Fans	x
19	Paul Jackson	
20	Grant Millington	B
21	Oliver Holmes	SR
22	Nathan Massey	P
23	Ryan McGoldrick	B
24	Steve Nash	x
25	Jordan Thompson	x
26	James Clare	x
27	John Davies	x
28	James Grehan	x
29	Josh Atkinson	x
30	Name	x
31	Name	x
32	Name	x
33	Name	x

== 2012 squad statistics ==
- Appearances and Points include (Super League, Challenge Cup and Play-offs) as of 2 September 2012.

No	Player	Position	Age	Previous club	Contracted Until	Apps	Tries	Goals	DG	Points
1	Richard Owen	Fullback	21	Castleford Tigers Academy	2015	23	10	0	0	40
2	Nick Youngquest	Winger, Centre	28	Crusaders Rugby League	2012	23	17	2	0	72
3	Joe Arundel	Winger	22	Castleford Tigers	2012	4	1	0	0	4
4	Kirk Dixon	Centre	N/A	Castleford Tigers	2014	17	3	39	0	90
5	Josh Griffin	Fullback, Winger		Wakefield Trinity Wildcats	2012	21	14	1	0	58
6	Rangi Chase	Stand Off	25	St George Illawarra Dragons	2015	16	2	0	0	8
7	Danny Orr	Half back	32	Harlequins RL	2012	24	6	16	0	56
8	Jake Emmitt	Prop	N/A	St Helens R.F.C.	2012	24	0	0	0	0
9	Daryl Clark	Hooker	19	Castleford Tigers	2016	14	4	0	0	16
10	Craig Huby	Prop	25	Castleford Tigers	2014	16	2	4	0	16
11	Brett Ferres	Second Row	N/A	Wakefield Trinity Wildcats	2012	18	7	0	0	28
12	Jonathan Walker	Second Row	N/A	Castleford Tigers	2012	17	1	0	0	4
13	Steve Snitch	Loose	N/A	Wakefield Trinity Wildcats	2012	18	2	0	0	8
14	Stuart Jones	Second Row	30	Huddersfield Giants	2012	26	4	0	0	16
15	Adam Milner	Hooker	20	Castleford Tigers	2014	20	3	0	0	12
16	Ryan Hudson	Hooker	33	Huddersfield Giants	2012	11	1	0	0	4
17	Lee Mitchell		N/A	Warrington Wolves – Loan	2012	22	2	0	0	8
18	Cas Fans	18th man	N/A	none	2012	0	0	0	0	0
19	Paul Jackson	Prop	0	N/A	2012	8	3	0	0	12
20	Grant Millington	Prop	25	Cronulla Sharks	2013	22	3	0	0	12
21	Oliver Holmes	Prop	19	Castleford Tigers	2014	22	3	0	0	12
22	Nathan Massey	Prop	22	Castleford Tigers	2013	26	1	0	0	4
23	Ryan McGoldrick	Fullback, Loose	30	Cronulla Sharks	2012	18	1	1	0	6
24	Stephen Nash	Second Row	N/A	Leigh Centurions	2013	8	0	0	0	0
25	Jordan Thompson	Wing	N/A	Castleford Tigers	2013	16	6	0	0	24
26	James Clare	Wing	N/A	Castleford Tigers	2012	3	1	0	0	4
27	John Davies	Second Row	N/A	Castleford Tigers	2012	1	0	0	0	0
28	James Grehan	Centre	N/A	N/A	2012	4	0	0	0	0
29	Josh Atkinson	Wing	N/A	Castleford Tigers Academy	2012	2	0	0	0	0
30	Ben Johnson	Scrum half/Stand Off			2012	2	0	0	0	0
31	Name				2012	0	0	0	0	0
32	Rhys Williams	Wing	N/A	Warrington Wolves – Loan	2012	8	4	0	0	16
33	Jamie Ellis	Scrum-half		Hull F.C.	2013	5	1	13	0	30

= Injured = Suspended

== Out of contract 2012 ==
Players out of contract in 2012:-

Brett Ferres – Signed with Huddersfield Giants.

Danny Orr – Retirement

Jacob Emmitt

Joe Arundel – Signed with Hull FC.

John Davies

Jonathan Walker

Josh Griffin – Signed with Leeds Tykes.

Nick Youngquest – Retirement

Paul Jackson

Ryan Hudson – Retirement

Ryan McGoldrick – Signed with Hull FC.

Stuart Jones

== 2012 transfers in/out ==
In

Name	Position	Signed from	Contract Length
Josh Griffin	Centre, Winger	Wakefield Trinity Wildcats	1 Year Deal
Stephen Nash	Prop, Second Row	Leigh Centurions	2 Year Deal
Grant Millington	Second Row, Prop	Canterbury Bulldogs	2 Year Deal
Lee Mitchell	Second Row, Prop	Warrington Wolves	season loan

Out

Name	Position	Club Signed	Contract Length
Dean Widders	Second Row	Retired	Retired
Willie Isa	Centre	Widnes Vikings	2 Year Deal
Greg Eden	Winger, Fullback	Huddersfield Giants	2 Year Deal
Nick Fozzard	Prop	St Helens R.F.C.	1 Year Deal
Martin Aspinwall	Second Row	Hull F.C.	1 Year Deal
Billy Harris	Second Row	Dewsbury Rams	Season Loan
James Clare	Winger	Dewsbury Rams	Dual Contract
Ryan Brierley	Stand Off	Leigh Centurions	Dual Contract
Richard Mathers	Fullback	Wakefield Trinity Wildcats	Season Loan
