= List of Castleford Tigers seasons =

Castleford Tigers are an English professional rugby league club based in Castleford, West Yorkshire. The club has competed in the sport since joining the Rugby Football League in 1926. This list details the club's achievements in all major competitions.

== Seasons ==
=== Super League era ===
Season	League									Play-offs	Challenge Cup	Other competitions		Top tryscorer		Top pointscorer	
Season	Division	P	W	D	L	F	A	Pts	Pos	Play-offs	Challenge Cup	Other competitions		Name	Tries	Name	Points
1996	Super League	22	9	0	13	548	599	18	9th		R4			Jason Flowers, Chris Smith, Tony Smith	10	Frano Botica	190
1997	Super League	22	5	2	15	334	515	12	10th		R4	Premiership	SF	Jason Critchley	12	Brad Davis	63
1997	Super League	22	5	2	15	334	515	12	10th		R4	World Club Championship	Grp	Jason Critchley	12	Brad Davis	63
1998	Super League	23	10	1	12	446	522	21	6th		QF			Danny Orr	10	Brad Davis	104
1999	Super League	30	19	3	8	712	451	41	5th	Lost in preliminary final	SF			Darren Rogers	23	Danny Orr	244
2000	Super League	28	17	0	11	585	571	34	5th	Lost in elimination play-off	R5			Darren Rogers	20	Danny Orr	163
2001	Super League	28	10	1	17	581	775	21	8th		R5			Danny Orr, Michael Smith	10	Danny Orr	160
2002	Super League	28	14	2	12	736	615	30	6th	Lost in elimination play-off	SF			Darren Rogers	18	Wayne Bartrim	262
2003	Super League	28	12	1	15	612	633	25	8th		R4			Danny Orr, Waine Pryce	13	Danny Orr	119
2004	Super League	28	6	0	22	515	924	12	12th		R5			Paul Mellor	15	Wayne Godwin	146
2005	National League One	18	15	0	3	683	368	30	2nd	Won NL1 Grand Final	R4	National League Cup	RU	Waine Pryce	31	Craig Huby	222
2006	Super League	28	9	1	18	575	968	19	11th		R4			Gray Viane	14	Danny Brough	68
2007	National League One	18	17	0	1	860	247	34	1st	Won NL1 Grand Final	R4	National League Cup	SF	Kirk Dixon	23	Danny Brough	290
2008	Super League	27	7	1	19	593	689	15	12th		R4			Luke Dorn	19	Joe Westerman	104
2009	Super League	27	14	0	13	645	702	28	7th	Lost in elimination play-off	QF			Kirk Dixon, Michael Shenton	19	Kirk Dixon	208
2010	Super League	27	11	0	16	648	766	22	9th		R4			Michael Shenton, Michael Wainwright, Joe Westerman	10	Joe Westerman	212
2011	Super League	27	12	2	13	664	808	26	9th		SF			Rangi Chase	15	Kirk Dixon	244
2012	Super League	27	6	0	21	554	948	12	13th		R4			Nick Youngquest	17	Kirk Dixon	90
2013	Super League	27	9	2	16	702	881	20	12th		R4			Justin Carney	21	Jamie Ellis	147
2014	Super League	27	17	2	8	814	583	36	4th	Lost in preliminary semi-final	RU			Justin Carney	24	Marc Sneyd	262
2015	Super League	30	16	0	14	731	746	32	5th		R6			Justin Carney, Denny Solomona	18	Luke Gale	249
2016	Super League	30	15	1	14	830	808	31	5th		QF			Denny Solomona	42	Luke Gale	270
2017	Super League	30	25	0	5	965	536	50	1st	Lost in Grand Final	QF			Greg Eden	41	Luke Gale	355
2018	Super League	30	20	1	9	767	582	41	3rd	Lost in semi-final	R6			Greg Eden	18	Jamie Ellis	123
2019	Super League	29	15	0	14	646	558	30	5th	Lost in elimination semi-final	R6			James Clare	16	Peter Mata'utia	125
2020	Super League	16	6	0	10	328	379	12	8th		R6			Greg Eden, Derrell Olpherts	8	Danny Richardson	117
2021	Super League	23	11	0	12	437	552	22	7th		RU			Jordan Turner	17	Danny Richardson	111
2022	Super League	27	13	0	14	544	620	26	7th		QF			Derrell Olpherts	18	Gareth O'Brien	115
2023	Super League	27	6	0	21	323	774	12	11th		R6			Greg Eden	9	Gareth Widdop	79
2024	Super League	27	7	1	19	425	735	15	10th		QF			Innes Senior	17	Rowan Milnes	135
2025	Super League	27	6	0	21	396	815	12	11th		R3			Josh Simm	8	Tex Hoy	64
2026	Super League	27	8	0	19	464	866	16	13th		R4			Jason Qareqare	19	Tom Weaver	148

== Bibliography ==
- Garbett, Ian; Garbett, Roy (14 August 2017). Castleford Rugby League Football Club: A Ninety Years Statistical & Pictorial Record 1926-2016. In memory of Len Garbett. Scratching Shed Publishing. ISBN 978-0995586109.
- "Rugby League Hall of Fame". Archived from the original on 13 May 2008.
- "Castleford Tigers - Seasons". Rugby League Project. Shawn Dollin, Andrew Ferguson and Bill Bates.
