= 2009 Castleford Tigers season =

The Castleford Tigers competed in their twelfth Super League in their 84th rugby league season. They also competed in the 2009 Challenge Cup.

== Transfers ==
Transfers for 2009 (in)

Name	Transferred from	Date released
Rangi Chase	St George Illawarra Dragons	October 2008
Dean Widders	South Sydney Rabbitohs	October 2008
Sione Faumuina	North Queensland Cowboys	October 2008
Stuart Jones	Huddersfield Giants	October 2008
Ryan Hudson	Huddersfield Giants	October 2008
James Evans	Bradford Bulls	October 2008
James Ford	Sheffield Eagles	October 2008
Chris Feather	Bradford Bulls	October 2008
Kirk Netherton	Hull Kingston Rovers	October 2008
Brett Ferres	Wakefield Trinity Wildcats	October 2008

Transfers for 2009 (out)

Name	Transferred to	Date released
Awen Guttenbeil	Retired	October 2008
Anthony Thackeray	Widnes Vikings	October 2008
Scott Moore	Huddersfield Giants	October 2008
Luke Dorn	Harlequins RL	October 2008
Ned Catic	Barrow Raiders	October 2008
Adam Fletcher	Released	October 2008
Stuart Donlan	Leigh Centurions	October 2008
Peter Lupton	Crusaders	October 2008
Mark Leafa	Released	October 2008
Andrew Henderson	Gateshead Thunder	October 2008
Michael Korkidas	Huddersfield Giants	October 2008

== Full squad ==
No	Player	Position	Previous club
1	Richard Owen	Full back	Castleford Tigers
2	Kirk Dixon	Wing	Hull
3	Michael Shenton	Center	Castleford Tigers
4	James Evans	Center	Bradford Bulls
5	Michael Wainwright	Wing	Batley Bulldogs
6	Rangi Chase	Stand off	St George Illawarra Dragons
7	Brent Sherwin	Half back	Canterbury Bulldogs
8	Mitchell Sargent	Prop	Newcastle Knights
9	Ryan Hudson (Captain)	Hooker	Huddersfield Giants
10	Craig Huby	Prop	Castleford Tigers
11	Brett Ferres	Second row	Wakefield Trinity Wildcats
12	Ryan Clayton	Second row	Salford City Reds
13	Joe Westerman	Loose forward	Castleford Tigers
15	Liam Higgins	Prop	Hull
16	Chris Feather	Prop	Bradford Bulls
17	Ryan Boyle	Prop	Castleford Tigers
18	Nathan Massey	Second row	Castleford Tigers
19	Kirk Netherton	Hooker	Hull Kingston Rovers
20	James Ford	Center	Sheffield Eagles
21	Sione Faumuina	Second row	North Queensland Cowboys
22			
23	Ryan McGoldrick	Center	Cronulla Sharks
24			
25	Dean Widders	Second row	South Sydney Rabbitohs
26	Joe Arundel	Centre	Castleford Tigers
27	Jamie Cording	Loose forward	Castleford Tigers
28	John Davies	Second row	Castleford Tigers
29	Ben Gledhill	Second row	Castleford Tigers
30	Jordan Thompson	Full back	Castleford Tigers
31	Jonathan Walker	Prop	Castleford Tigers

== Fixtures and results ==
Competition	Round	Opponent	Result	Score	Home/away	Venue	Attendance	Date
Super League XIV	1	Harlequins RL	Loss	8–12	Home	The Jungle	7,049	15 February 2009
Super League XIV	2	Wigan Warriors	Win	22–28	Away	JJB Stadium	12,079	20 February 2009
Super League XIV	3	Salford City Reds	Win	52–16	Home	The Jungle	7,052	28 February 2009
Super League XIV	4	Catalans Dragons	Win	22–24	Away	Stade Gilbert Brutus	8,150	7 March 2009
Super League XIV	5	Huddersfield Giants	Loss	24–26	Home	The Jungle	6,572	14 March 2009
Super League XIV	6	Hull F.C.	Win	18–19	Away	KC Stadium	14,028	20 March 2009
Super League XIV	7	Bradford Bulls	Win	28–26	Home	The Jungle	9,185	29 March 2009
Challenge Cup 2009	4	Keighley Cougars	Win	20–64	Away	Cougar Park	3,255	5 April 2009
Super League XIV	8	Wakefield Trinity Wildcats	Loss	6–35	Home	The Jungle	10,155	10 April 2009
Super League XIV	9	Warrington Wolves	Win	6–28	Away	Halliwell Jones Stadium	8,202	13 April 2009
Super League XIV	10	St Helens R.F.C.	Loss	22–68	Home	The Jungle	8,003	19 April 2009
Super League XIV	11	Crusaders	Win	22–34	Away	Brewery Field	2,857	26 April 2009
Super League XIV	12	Hull F.C.	Loss	24–16	Neutral	Murrayfield Stadium	30,122	3 May 2009
Challenge Cup 2009	5	Halifax	Win^{[A]}	34–34	Home	The Jungle	5,595	9 May 2009
Super League XIV	13	Leeds Rhinos	Loss	22–24	Home	The Jungle	8,082	15 May 2009
Super League XIV	14	Hull Kingston Rovers	Loss	16–6	Away	New Craven Park	8,104	22 May 2009
Challenge Cup 2009	QF	Huddersfield Giants	Loss	16–14	Away	Galpharm Stadium	6,359	31 May 2009
Super League XIV	15	Warrington Wolves	Loss	18–34	Home	The Jungle	5,628	6 June 2009
Super League XIV	16	St Helens RLFC	Loss	50–10	Away	GPW Recruitment Stadium	9,680	12 June 2009
Super League XIV	17	Huddersfield Giants	Win	6–13	Away	Galpharm Stadium	6,010	19 June 2009
Super League XIV	18	Catalans Dragons	Loss	22–16	Home	The Jungle	5,508	28 June 2009
Super League XIV	19	Bradford Bulls	Win	38–40	Away	Grattan Stadium	8,971	5 July 2009
Super League XIV	20	Hull FC	Win	40–18	Home	The Jungle	8,297	12 July 2009
Super League XIV	21	Salford City Reds	Win	12–18	Away	The Willows	3,487	17 July 2009
Super League XIV	22	Wakefield Trinity Wildcats	Win	20–12	Away	Belle Vue	8,371	26 July 2009
Super League XIV	23	Hull Kingston Rovers	Loss	28–46	Home	The Jungle	8,709	2 August 2009
Super League XIV	24	Leeds Rhinos	Loss	76–12	Away	Headingley Stadium	16,931	14 August 2009
Super League XIV	25	Wigan Warriors			Home	The Jungle		23 August 2009
Super League XIV	26	Harlequins RL			Away	The Twickenham Stoop		5 September 2009
Super League XIV	27	Celtic Crusaders			Home	The Jungle		13 September 2009

== League table ==
Pos	Team	Pld	W	D	L	PF	PA	PD	Pts	Qualification
1	Leeds Rhinos (L, C)	27	21	0	6	805	453	+352	42	Play-offs
2	St Helens	27	19	0	8	733	466	+267	38	Play-offs
3	Huddersfield Giants	27	18	0	9	690	416	+274	36	Play-offs
4	Hull Kingston Rovers	27	17	1	9	650	516	+134	35	Play-offs
5	Wakefield Trinity Wildcats	27	16	0	11	685	609	+76	32	Play-offs
6	Wigan Warriors	27	15	0	12	659	551	+108	30	Play-offs
7	Castleford Tigers	27	14	0	13	645	702	−57	28	Play-offs
8	Catalans Dragons	27	13	0	14	613	660	−47	26	Play-offs
9	Bradford Bulls	27	12	1	14	653	668	−15	25	
10	Warrington Wolves	27	12	0	15	649	705	−56	24	
11	Harlequins	27	11	0	16	591	691	−100	22	
12	Hull F.C.	27	10	0	17	502	623	−121	20	
13	Salford City Reds	27	7	0	20	456	754	−298	14	
14	Celtic Crusaders	27	3	0	24	357	874	−517	6	

Source: Rugby League Project
Rules for classification: 1) Points; 2) Points difference; 3) Number of points scored;
(C) Champions; (L) League Leaders' Shield Winners

== Notes ==
1. ^{a} Castleford win 35–34 via the golden point rule.
