= Adam Milner =

English rugby league footballer

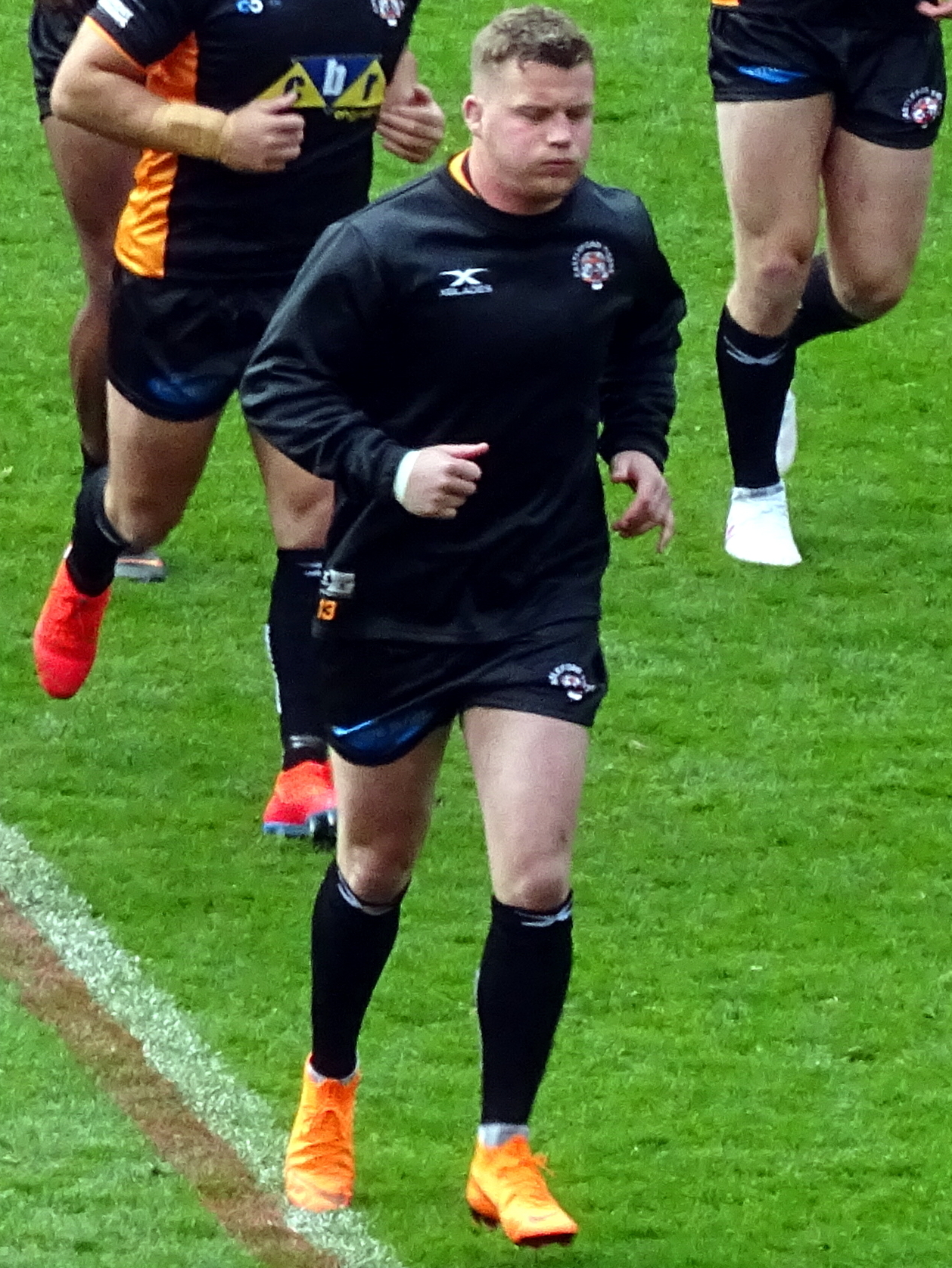

Personal information
- Full name: Adam James Milner
- Born: 19 December 1991 (age 34) Wakefield, West Yorkshire, England
- Height: 6 ft 1 in (1.86 m)
- Weight: 14 st 5 lb (91 kg)

Playing information
- Position: Loose forward, Hooker
Club
Years	Team	Pld	T	G	FG	P
2010–23	Castleford Tigers	301	38	1	0	154
2023(loan)	→ Huddersfield Giants	13	1	0	0	4
2024	Huddersfield Giants	22	3	0	0	12
2025–26	Oldham	33	1	0	0	4
2027–	Sheffield Eagles	0	0	0	0	0
	Total	369	43	1	0	174
Representative
Years	Team	Pld	T	G	FG	P
2018	England	3	0	0	0	0
- Source: As of 6 November 2026

Adam Milner (born 19 December 1991) is an English professional rugby league footballer who plays as a loose forward or hooker for Sheffield Eagles in the RFL Championship, combined with also being assistant coach. He has previously played for England at international level.

He had previously played the majority of his professional club career with the Castleford Tigers. Across 14 seasons, he made over 300 appearances, with only Michael Shenton and Nathan Massey having registered more for the Tigers in the Super League era. He spent two seasons at the Huddersfield Giants before moving to the Championship with Oldham.

== Background ==
Milner was born in Wakefield, West Yorkshire, England.

Milner played junior rugby league for Stanley Rangers.

== Club career ==
=== Castleford Tigers ===
==== Breakthrough ====
Having come through the Tigers' academy system, Milner made his Super League début against Huddersfield Giants on Sunday 4 July 2010.

Milner scored his first try for Castleford against Harlequins RL on 21 August 2010. He followed up his début try with another one in the following league game against St. Helens, in the last match at Knowsley Road. He made 4 appearances and scored 2 tries in his first season.

Prior to the 2011 season, Milner was given the number 16 shirt, with Castleford head coach Terry Matterson saying "I think he's going to get plenty of first team footy this year." He made 22 appearances and scored 4 tries. At the end of the season, he signed a new three-year deal with the Tigers.

==== First team hooker ====
Having firmly established himself in Castleford's first team, Milner made 21 appearances and scored 3 tries in the 2012 season.

2013 was Milner's highest scoring season yet for Castleford, with 7 tries in 23 appearances. In August, he signed a two-year contract extension until the end of 2016, saying, "As soon as I got the contract offer I didn't think twice about signing it." Head coach Daryl Powell said, "both his attacking game and his toughness in defence are developing every week and I know he will continue to work hard to achieve his undoubted potential."

Milner was awarded for his consistent performances at hooker with squad number 9 for the 2014 season. He made a further 25 appearances and scored 3 tries to help Castleford to a 4th placed finish in Super League.

He played in all but 3 of the Tigers' matches in 2015, playing more minutes and taking a larger role in the team following the departure of Man of Steel-winning hooker Daryl Clark to Warrington at the end of the previous season. He made 28 appearances and scored 3 tries.

In February 2016, Milner signed a two-year contract extension, keeping him with the Tigers until the end of 2018. He was ever-present throughout Castleford's injury-struck 2016 season, appearing in all 32 matches. He mostly played as a hooker, but switched position to loose forward towards the end of the campaign due to mounting injuries in the squad. At the club's end-of-season awards night, Milner was named Directors' Player of the Year and 2nd place Player of the Year.

==== Evolving role ====
For the 2017 campaign, Milner was assigned squad number 13, indicating his switch in position to loose forward. He played a crucial role in Castleford's play-off semi-final golden point victory over St. Helens - just minutes after making a try-saving tackle on Tommy Makinson, he burrowed his way over the line for a try under the sticks. He was voted as the Fans' Man of the Match for his efforts. He also played in the 2017 Super League Grand Final defeat by the Leeds Rhinos at Old Trafford.

Milner kicked the first goal of his career on Castleford's visit to the Warrington Wolves on 8 June 2018, in the absence of the Tigers' first choice 5 kickers. In July 2018, Milner signed a new three-year contract with the Tigers, keeping him at the club until the end of 2021. This was despite a number of NRL clubs declaring an interest in him as a result of his impressive form. Castleford director of rugby Jon Wells said: "I think it sends a clear and bold statement about our ambitions as a club and I am delighted that Adam will now move into the best years of his career as a Castleford Tiger."

It was Milner's try from dummy half against the Wigan Warriors on 5 April 2019 that completed the Tigers' comeback from a 20-point deficit, in a game they went on to win. He opened the scoring in Castleford's Elimination final victory over the Warrington Wolves in the play-offs, touching down a deft Paul McShane kick. In this year, he made 28 appearances and scored 3 tries.

Going into the 2020 season, Milner said he felt "fitter, faster and stronger" and talked of his desire to further improve his performances. He scored against the Toronto Wolfpack in Castleford's first match of the campaign.

==== Veteran ====
Milner was granted a testimonial year in 2021, and took on Hull Kingston Rovers at Craven Park for his testimonial match on 14 March. On 17 July 2021, he played for Castleford in their 2021 Challenge Cup Final loss against St Helens. In August, it was announced that Milner had signed a new two-year deal with Castleford; "To remain a one-club man, which is something I pride myself on, is a proud moment, I am excited for what is to come," he said.

The 2022 season saw Milner assume squad number 12 due to the return of Joe Westerman to Castleford. He scored a try against Toulouse Olympique on 1 April after recovering from a back injury sustained in pre-season which delayed his start to the campaign. On playing under new head coach Lee Radford, Milner said, "I think bringing a new coach in has certainly helped the environment and the team go in a bit of a different direction." Milner finished the season with 19 appearances, having featured at both second-row and hooker.

In 2023, Milner returned to squad number 16 after last wearing it in 2011. His performance against the Leeds Rhinos in Castleford's first victory of the 2023 season saw him named in the Super League Team of the Week. On 24 March, he made his 300th career appearance. In April, Wakefield Trinity enquired about Milner's availability but Castleford declined the move. On 5 May, he made his 300th Castleford appearance.

On 25 May 2023, Milner confirmed that he would leave the Castleford Tigers with immediate effect. He said, "I am immensely proud to have worn the Cas colours and represent this amazing club for so long. I'm gutted the way it has ended and it has been an incredibly emotional time for myself to leave, but I am looking forward to a new challenge at Huddersfield."

=== Huddersfield Giants ===
On 19 May 2023, Huddersfield Giants head coach Ian Watson first confirmed his interest in signing Milner, who was in the final year of his Castleford contract. The next week, on 25 May, the Giants announced the signing of Milner, initially on a season-long loan deal. This would be made permanent at the end of the season, on a one-year deal with an option for a further year. He was ineligible for Huddersfield's game against Castleford the following day, and made his debut on 4 June against St Helens at the Magic Weekend. In the build up towards his Wheldon Road return in August, Milner admitted, "It's not just another game," and said, "It'll be nice to see some familiar faces, not just the playing squad but the backroom staff, supporters and sponsors." He went on to score his first Huddersfield try against his former club, crossing late on to confirm a resounding victory over the Tigers.

=== Oldham RLFC ===
On 26 September 2024 it was reported that he had signed for Oldham RLFC in the RFL Championship on a two-year deal.

=== Sheffield Eagles ===
On 6 November 2026 it was reported that he had signed for Sheffield Eagles in the RFL Championship as player-assistant coach

== International career ==
Milner represented England Schools U16s on their tour of France in Easter 2008. He played as a hooker in the 26-24 defeat by France U16s in Tonneins, scoring the first try of the series and receiving a Man of the Match award. He played as a hooker in the 36-8 victory over France U16s.

Milner captained the England Academy in 2010. He represented England Academy as a hooker in the 40-16 victory over France U18s at the Stade Max Rousié on 9 June 2010, and scored a try. He played as a hooker in the 38-30 victory over Australian Institute of Sport (AIS) at the Leigh Sports Village on 4 December 2010, and the 34-22 victory over Australian Institute of Sport (AIS) at Leigh Sports Village on 11 December 2010.

In July 2018, Milner was called up to the England Elite Performance Squad for the second phase of the season, in the build up towards the International Test Series against New Zealand later in the year. He made his senior international début on 17 October 2018 in England's 44-6 victory against France at the Leigh Sports Village. He represented England in their 20-14 victory over New Zealand at Anfield on 4 November 2018, and in their 0-34 loss to New Zealand at Elland Road on 11 November 2018 in their three-match test series.

== Statistics ==
=== Club career ===
Appearances and points in all competitions by year
Club	Season	Tier	App	T	G	DG	Pts
Castleford Tigers	2010	Super League	4	2	0	0	8
Castleford Tigers	2011	Super League	22	4	0	0	16
Castleford Tigers	2012	Super League	21	3	0	0	12
Castleford Tigers	2013	Super League	23	7	0	0	28
Castleford Tigers	2014	Super League	25	3	0	0	12
Castleford Tigers	2015	Super League	28	3	0	0	12
Castleford Tigers	2016	Super League	32	3	0	0	12
Castleford Tigers	2017	Super League	29	4	0	0	16
Castleford Tigers	2018	Super League	29	3	1	0	14
Castleford Tigers	2019	Super League	28	3	0	0	12
Castleford Tigers	2020	Super League	13	2	0	0	8
Castleford Tigers	2021	Super League	19	0	0	0	0
Castleford Tigers	2022	Super League	19	1	0	0	4
Castleford Tigers	2023	Super League	9	0	0	0	0
Castleford Tigers	Total		301	38	1	0	154
Huddersfield Giants	2023 (Note: On loan from Castleford in 2023 before joining permanently in 2024)	Super League	13	1	0	0	4
Huddersfield Giants	2024	Super League	22	3	0	0	12
Huddersfield Giants	Total		35	4	0	0	16
Oldham R.L.F.C.	2025	Championship	29	1	0	0	4
Oldham R.L.F.C.	2026	Championship	4	0	0	0	0
Oldham R.L.F.C.	Total		33	1	0	0	4
Sheffield Eagles	2027	Championship	0	0	0	0	0
Sheffield Eagles	Total		0	0	0	0	0
Career total			369	43	1	0	174

As of match played 20 February 2026

=== International career ===
Against	App	T	G	FG	Pts
France	1	0	0	0	0
New Zealand	2	0	0	0	0
Totals	3	0	0	0	0
