= Oliver Holmes (rugby league) =

England international rugby league footballer

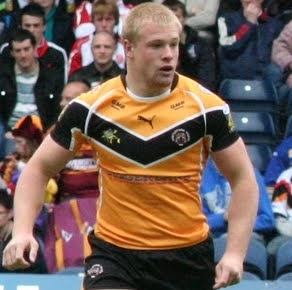

Personal information
- Full name: Oliver Josh Holmes
- Born: 7 August 1992 (age 34) Altofts, West Yorkshire, England
- Height: 6 ft 0 in (1.83 m)
- Weight: 15 st 4 lb (97 kg)

Playing information
- Position: Second-row, Loose forward
Club
| Years | Team | Pld | T | G | FG | P |
|---|---|---|---|---|---|---|
| 2010–21 | Castleford Tigers | 229 | 45 | 0 | 0 | 180 |
| 2022 | Warrington Wolves | 24 | 3 | 0 | 0 | 12 |
| 2023–24 | Leigh Leopards | 28 | 3 | 0 | 0 | 12 |
| 2025 | Hull F.C. | 1 | 0 | 0 | 0 | 0 |
| | Total | 282 | 51 | 0 | 0 | 204 |
Representative
| Years | Team | Pld | T | G | FG | P |
| 2018 | England | 1 | 0 | 0 | 0 | 0 |
| 2018 | England Knights | 2 | 0 | 0 | 0 | 0 |
- Source: As of 5 June 2025

Oliver Holmes (born 7 August 1992) is an English former professional rugby league footballer who last played as a second-row forward for Hull FC in the Super League.

He has played at representative level for England and the England Knights. He has previously played for the Castleford Tigers, where he spent the majority of his club career, as well as the Warrington Wolves and the Leigh Leopards in Super League.

== Background ==
Holmes was born in Castleford, West Yorkshire, England.

== Club career ==
=== Castleford Tigers ===
Holmes made his senior Castleford debut against the Huddersfield Giants on 9 April 2010.

Holmes scored a try in the 2014 Challenge Cup final defeat by the Leeds Rhinos at Wembley Stadium.

Holmes played in Castleford's victory over Wakefield Trinity in August 2017, to help the club secure their first ever top-flight league title. He also played in the 2017 Super League Grand Final defeat by the Leeds Rhinos at Old Trafford.

On 17 July 2021, he played for Castleford in their 2021 Challenge Cup final loss against St Helens.

=== Warrington Wolves ===
In June 2021, Holmes signed a three-year contract to join the Warrington Wolves from 2022 until the end of the 2024 season.

On 11 August 2022, during a match game between Toulouse Olympique and Warrington, Holmes was assaulted by Toulouse player Corey Norman who stuck his hand in Holmes' buttocks. Norman received an eight-game suspension and £500 fine.

=== Leigh Leopards ===
On 20 October 2022, Holmes signed a contract to join the newly promoted Leigh side.

On 12 August 2023, Holmes played for Leigh in their 2023 Challenge Cup final victory over Hull Kingston Rovers. Holmes played 19 games for Leigh in the 2023 Super League season as the club finished fifth on the table and qualified for the playoffs.

=== Hull FC ===
On 9 July 2024, it was announced that Holmes had signed for Hull FC in the Super League from the 2025 season.

On 4 June 2025 he announced his retirement from the professional game after just one appearance for Hull FC, due to a persistent knee injury.

== International career ==
In July 2018, he was selected in the England Knights Performance squad.

Holmes made his England debut on 17 October 2018 in England's 44–6 win over France at Leigh Sports Village.

In 2018, he was selected for the England Knights on their tour of Papua New Guinea. He played in the Knights' 12–16 victory at the Lae Football Stadium in Lae, and their 32–22 loss at the Oil Search National Football Stadium in Port Moresby.

== Club statistics ==
Appearances and points in all competitions by year
| Club | Season | Tier | App | T | G | DG | Pts |
|---|---|---|---|---|---|---|---|
| Castleford Tigers | 2010 | Super League | 5 | 0 | 0 | 0 | 0 |
| Castleford Tigers | 2011 | Super League | 19 | 1 | 0 | 0 | 4 |
| Castleford Tigers | 2012 | Super League | 23 | 4 | 0 | 0 | 16 |
| Castleford Tigers | 2013 | Super League | 23 | 2 | 0 | 0 | 8 |
| Castleford Tigers | 2014 | Super League | 32 | 7 | 0 | 0 | 28 |
| Castleford Tigers | 2015 | Super League | 28 | 5 | 0 | 0 | 20 |
| Castleford Tigers | 2016 | Super League | 15 | 5 | 0 | 0 | 20 |
| Castleford Tigers | 2017 | Super League | 10 | 1 | 0 | 0 | 4 |
| Castleford Tigers | 2018 | Super League | 27 | 9 | 0 | 0 | 36 |
| Castleford Tigers | 2019 | Super League | 15 | 3 | 0 | 0 | 12 |
| Castleford Tigers | 2020 | Super League | 12 | 2 | 0 | 0 | 8 |
| Castleford Tigers | 2021 | Super League | 20 | 6 | 0 | 0 | 24 |
| Castleford Tigers | Total | | 229 | 45 | 0 | 0 | 180 |
| Warrington Wolves | 2022 | Super League | 24 | 3 | 0 | 0 | 12 |
| Leigh Leopards | 2023 | Super League | 22 | 1 | 0 | 0 | 4 |
| Leigh Leopards | 2024 | Super League | 6 | 2 | 0 | 0 | 8 |
| Leigh Leopards | Total | | 28 | 3 | 0 | 0 | 12 |
| Hull F.C. | 2025 | Super League | 1 | 0 | 0 | 0 | 0 |
| Career total | | | 282 | 51 | 0 | 0 | 204 |

As of match played 5 October 2024
