= Nathan Massey (rugby league, born 1989) =

English rugby league footballer

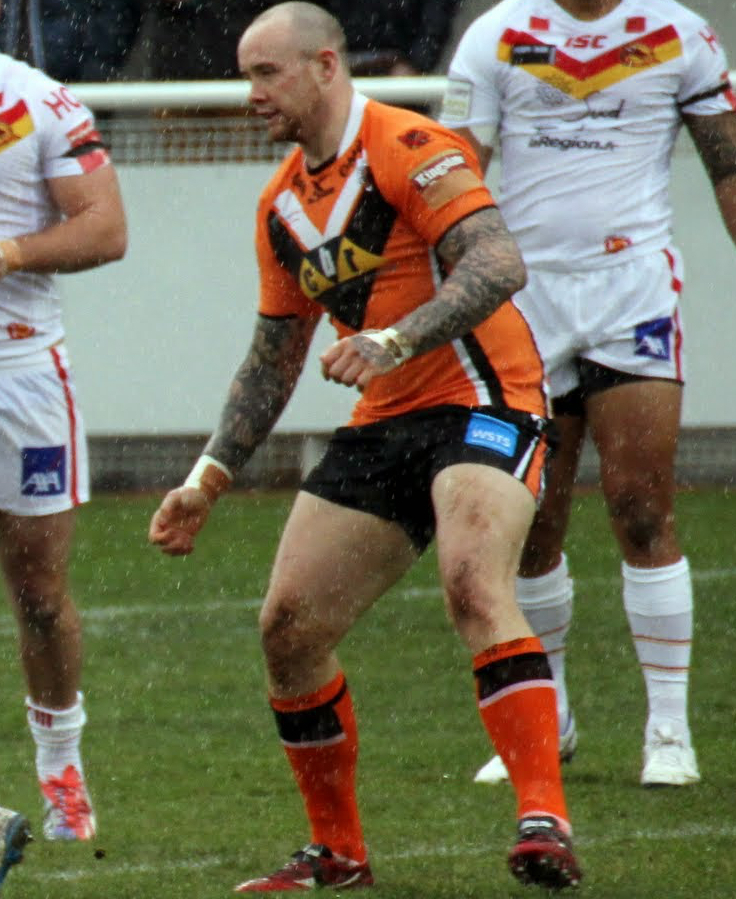

Personal information
- Full name: Nathan Christopher Massey
- Born: 11 July 1989 (age 36); Castleford, West Yorkshire, England

Playing information
- Height: 5 ft 11 in (1.80 m)
- Weight: 16 st 1 lb (102 kg)
- Position: Prop, Loose forward
Club
Years	Team	Pld	T	G	FG	P
2007–23	Castleford Tigers	302	13	0	0	52
2008(loan)	→ Featherstone Rovers	3	0	0	0	0
2008(loan)	→ York City Knights	5	0	0	0	0
2009(loan)	→ Gateshead Thunder	10	0	0	0	0
2010(DR)	→ Keighley Cougars	1	0	0	0	0
2011(DR)	→ York City Knights	8	1	0	0	4
2024	Featherstone Rovers	7	1	0	0	4
	Total	336	15	0	0	60

Nathan Massey (born 11 July 1989) is an English former professional rugby league footballer who played as a prop or loose forward in the Super League and the RFL Championship in the 2000s, 2010s and 2020s.

Massey spent the majority of his playing career with the Castleford Tigers in the Super League after progressing through the club's academy. Across a 19-year stay at Castleford, he made 302 senior appearances, ranking second only to former captain Michael Shenton in the summer era. He played in the 2014 and 2021 Challenge Cup finals, the 2017 Super League Grand Final, and won the 2017 League Leaders' Shield.

Early in his career, he spent time on loan or dual registration from Castleford at Featherstone Rovers, Gateshead Thunder, and York City Knights in the RFL Championship, and at the Keighley Cougars and York City Knights in League 1. He signed for Featherstone Rovers in 2024 where he spent one season before announcing his retirement.

== Background ==
Massey was born in Castleford, West Yorkshire, England.

Massey played junior rugby league for Wakefield-based side Walton Warriors before being signed to the Castleford Tigers academy at the age of 15.

== Playing career ==
=== Castleford Tigers ===
Massey progressed through the ranks at the Castleford Tigers academy and made his first team début on 11 March 2007 in an 88–10 victory over Castleford Lock Lane in the Challenge Cup. He was named the Tigers Academy player of the year in 2007.

On 24 March 2008, Massey made his Super League début for Castleford against the Warrington Wolves. In the 2008 season, Massey spent time on loan at Featherstone in the Championship and at York in League 1 to gain first team experience. He impressed for the Knights, who expressed a desire to extend his stay at the club into the next season. He was given an upgraded full-time contract by Castleford in August 2008.

Massey spent time on loan at Gateshead Thunder alongside several Castleford teammates in 2009. In March 2010, he joined Keighley Cougars on a dual registration deal. Despite making an impressive debut, he suffered a severe shoulder injury against the Sheffield Eagles in his first game for the club, ending his season prematurely.

Massey began the 2011 season playing for the York City Knights in the Championship through their dual registration arrangement with Castleford. He had been linked with a loan move to Harlequins but the Tigers preferred he went to York, from whom he could be recalled each week if needed. In his second spell with the club, he was voted the Player of the Month for February, and scored his first competitive try on 13 March against Hunslet. In June, the Knights decided against renewing Massey's temporary deal to free up salary cap space and instead develop their own players; he scored 2 tries against Rochdale in the Challenge Cup on his return to Castleford. Injuries to teammates afforded Massey an extended run in the Tigers' first team, and he made 15 appearances during the remainder of the season.

He played in the 2014 Challenge Cup Final defeat by the Leeds Rhinos at Wembley Stadium.

He played in the 2017 Super League Grand Final defeat by the Leeds Rhinos at Old Trafford.

On 30 April 2021, Massey made his 250th Castleford appearance. On 17 July 2021, he played for Castleford in their 2021 Challenge Cup Final loss against St Helens.

Massey made his 300th Castleford appearance on 8 September 2023 in the Tigers' 29–12 victory over Hull FC.

=== Featherstone Rovers ===
On 10 November 2023, it was announced that Massey had signed for Featherstone Rovers for the 2024 season. He had originally agreed terms while Featherstone were anticipating promotion to the Super League, but said he "wanted to commit to the project even though we're still in the Championship".

=== International honours ===
On 4 November 2007, Massey was named as one of ten interchanges for the United States in a 70–0 warm-up game defeat by Cumbria at Barrow's stadium, Craven Park. He has later clarified that he has "no allegiance to America", with the experience coming about through U.S. team manager Mick Robinson being football manager at Castleford. He has had no involvement since, being ineligible under IRL rules.

== Statistics ==
Appearances and points in all competitions by year
Club	Season	Tier	App	T	G	DG	Pts
Castleford Tigers	2007	National League One	1	0	0	0	0
Castleford Tigers	2008	Super League	2	0	0	0	0
Castleford Tigers	2009	Super League	4	0	0	0	0
Castleford Tigers	2010	Super League	2	0	0	0	0
Castleford Tigers	2011	Super League	15	2	0	0	8
Castleford Tigers	2012	Super League	27	1	0	0	4
Castleford Tigers	2013	Super League	28	4	0	0	16
Castleford Tigers	2014	Super League	23	1	0	0	4
Castleford Tigers	2015	Super League	23	2	0	0	8
Castleford Tigers	2016	Super League	21	0	0	0	0
Castleford Tigers	2017	Super League	30	1	0	0	4
Castleford Tigers	2018	Super League	26	0	0	0	0
Castleford Tigers	2019	Super League	27	1	0	0	4
Castleford Tigers	2020	Super League	15	1	0	0	4
Castleford Tigers	2021	Super League	22	0	0	0	0
Castleford Tigers	2022	Super League	16	0	0	0	0
Castleford Tigers	2023	Super League	20	0	0	0	0
Castleford Tigers	Total		302	13	0	0	52
→ York City Knights (loan/DR)	2008	National League Two	5	0	0	0	0
→ York City Knights (loan/DR)	2011	Championship	8	1	0	0	4
→ York City Knights (loan/DR)	Total		13	1	0	0	4
→ Gateshead Thunder (loan)	2009	Championship	10	0	0	0	0
→ Keighley Cougars (DR)	2010	Championship 1	1	0	0	0	0
Featherstone Rovers	2008 (Note: On loan from Castleford in 2008 before joining permanently in 2024)	National League One	3	0	0	0	0
Featherstone Rovers	2024	Championship	7	1	0	0	4
Featherstone Rovers	Total		10	1	0	0	4
Career total			336	15	0	0	60
