= 2007 National League One =

National League One 2007
- League: Championship
- Duration: 18 rounds
- Teams: 10
- Broadcast partners: Sky Sports

2007 season
- National League One winners: Castleford Tigers

The league was televised live for the first time following a deal with the broadcaster Sky Sports.

Castleford Tigers were relegated from the Super League in 2006, while Dewsbury Rams and Sheffield Eagles gained promotion from National League Two. York City Knights and Oldham R.L.F.C. are relegated to National League Two.

National League Three was abolished for the 2007 season and rebranded as the Rugby League Conference National division.

== National League One ==
=== Table ===
| Position | Club | Played | Won | Drawn | Lost | Pts For | Pts Agst | B.P. | Points |
|---|---|---|---|---|---|---|---|---|---|
| 1 | Castleford Tigers | 18 | 17 | 0 | 1 | 860 | 247 | 0 | 51 |
| 2 | Widnes Vikings | 18 | 16 | 0 | 2 | 740 | 220 | 2 | 50 |
| 3 | Halifax | 18 | 12 | 0 | 6 | 616 | 421 | 2 | 38 |
| 4 | Whitehaven | 18 | 11 | 0 | 7 | 474 | 342 | 5 | 38 |
| 5 | Leigh Centurions | 18 | 9 | 0 | 9 | 454 | 474 | 4 | 31 |
| 6 | Sheffield Eagles | 18 | 6 | 1 | 11 | 414 | 527 | 4 | 24 |
| 7 | Dewsbury Rams | 18 | 5 | 0 | 13 | 346 | 572 | 6 | 19 |
| 8 | Batley Bulldogs | 18 | 5 | 1 | 12 | 372 | 645 | 2 | 19 |
| 9 | Rochdale Hornets | 18 | 3 | 0 | 15 | 302 | 700 | 1 | 10 |
| 10 | Doncaster Lakers* | 18 | 5 | 0 | 13 | 348 | 778 | 1 | 10* |

| Team finishing top of the table, earning the League Leaders Shield |
| Teams qualifying for the Play-offs |
| Teams in relegation position |

- Rochdale and Doncaster relegated to National League Two for 2008.
- Doncaster deducted 6 points due to entering administration.

=== Playoffs ===
Elimination play-offs
September 2007
3 | Halifax | W
6 | Sheffield Eagles | L
September 2007
4 | Whitehaven | W
5 | Leigh Centurions | L

Qualifying / Elimination semifinal
September 2007
1 | Castleford Tigers | 26
2 | Widnes Vikings | 8
September 2007
Halifax | W
Whitehaven | L

Elimination final
September 2007
Widnes Vikings | 36
Halifax | 24

Grand Final
6 October 2007
Castleford Tigers | 42
Widnes Vikings | 10

Week One.

- Whitehaven (H) beat Leigh (A) (Whitehaven through to week two, Leigh are eliminated).
- Halifax (H) beat Sheffield (A) (Halifax through to week two, Sheffield are eliminated).

Week Two.

- Castleford (H) beat Widnes (A) (Castleford through to the Grand Final in week four, Widnes play in week three).
- Halifax (A) beat Whitehaven (H) (Halifax will play Widnes in week three's semi final, Whitehaven are eliminated).

Week Three.

- Widnes (H) beat Halifax (A) (Widnes are through to the Grand Final in week four, Halifax are eliminated).

==== Grand Final ====
7 October 2007

| Castleford Tigers | 42 – 10 | Widnes Vikings |
|---|---|---|
| Tries: Guttenbeil (2), Shenton, McGoldrick, Westerman, Clayton, Wainwright; Goals: Brough (6); Drop goals: Brough (2) | | Tries: Nanyn, Wilkes; Goals: Nanyn |

Headingley, Leeds
Attendance: 20,814
Referee: Phil Bentham (Warrington)
