= Grant Millington =

Australian professional rugby league footballer

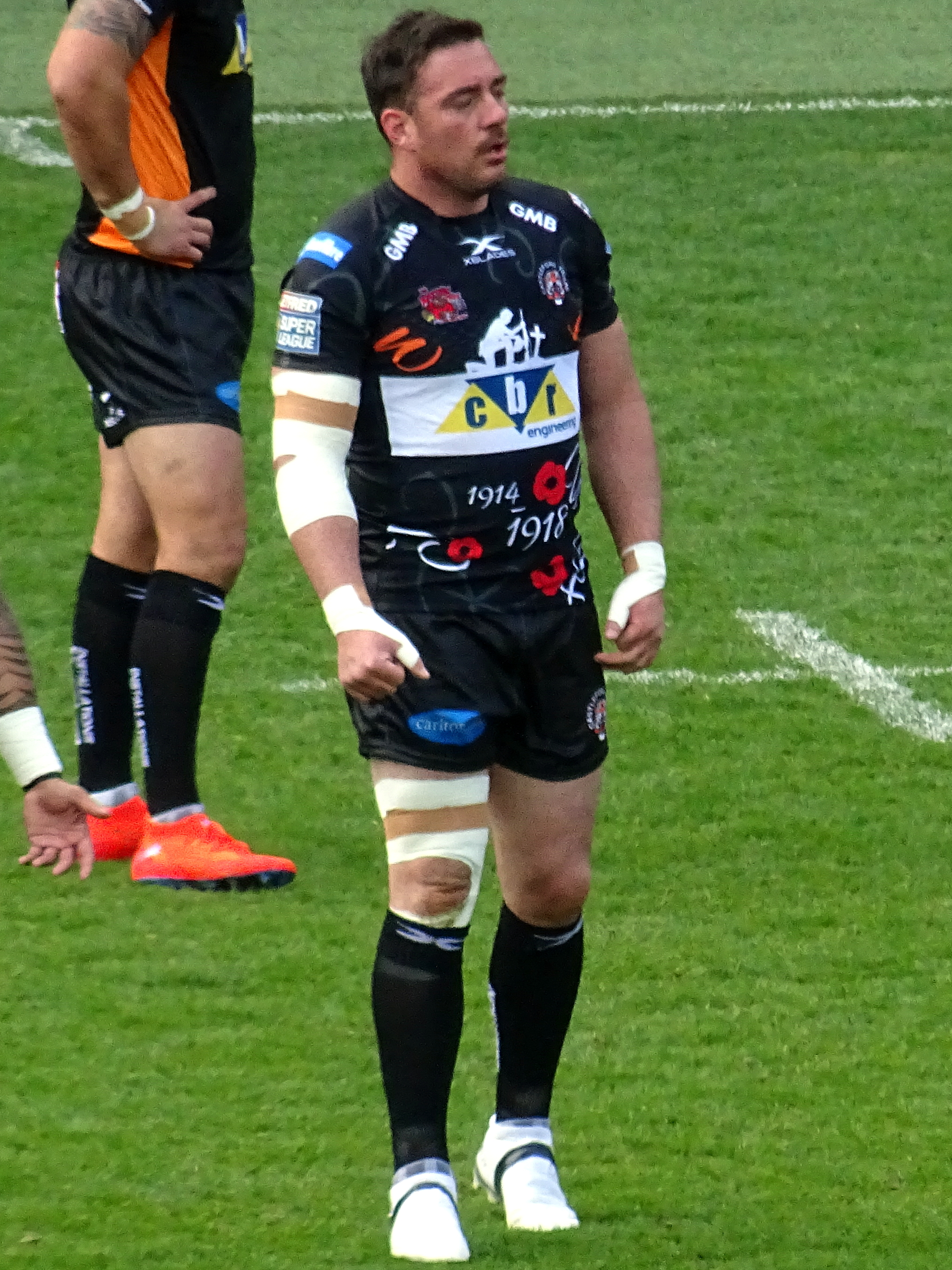

Personal information
- Full name: Grant William Millington
- Born: 1 November 1986 (age 39) Auburn, New South Wales, Australia

Playing information
- Height: 194 cm (6 ft 4 in)
- Weight: 112 kg (17 st 9 lb)
- Position: Prop, Second-row, Loose forward
Club
Years	Team	Pld	T	G	FG	P
2008–10	Cronulla Sharks	49	7	0	0	28
2011	Canterbury Bulldogs	6	1	0	0	4
2012–21	Castleford Tigers	244	33	0	0	132
2022–23	Western Suburbs Red Devils	1	0	0	0	0
	Total	300	41	0	0	164

Grant William Millington (born 1 November 1986) is an Australian former professional rugby league footballer, who last played as a prop, second-row or loose forward for the Western Suburbs Red Devils in the Country Rugby League.

He previously played for Castleford Tigers in the Super League and in the NRL for the Cronulla-Sutherland Sharks between 2008 and 2010, and for the Canterbury-Bankstown Bulldogs in 2011.

Millington holds the Castleford club record for most appearances made by an overseas player, accumulating 244 across his 10 seasons with the Tigers. He is widely recognised as one of the club's greatest imports, and is considered a fans' favourite due to his consistency and commitment as well as his community contributions off the pitch. He was utilised as a skilful, ball-handling and intelligent prop/second-row forward and was even called upon to cover in the halves on occasion.

== Early life ==
Millington was born in Auburn, New South Wales, Australia.

He played his junior rugby league for the Cabramatta Two Blues and Wyong Roos.

== Playing career ==
=== Cronulla-Sutherland Sharks ===
Millington made his first grade debut for Cronulla in round 10 of the 2008 NRL season against Brisbane. Cronulla-Sutherland went on to finish third in 2008 but Millington made no appearances for the club during the finals series.

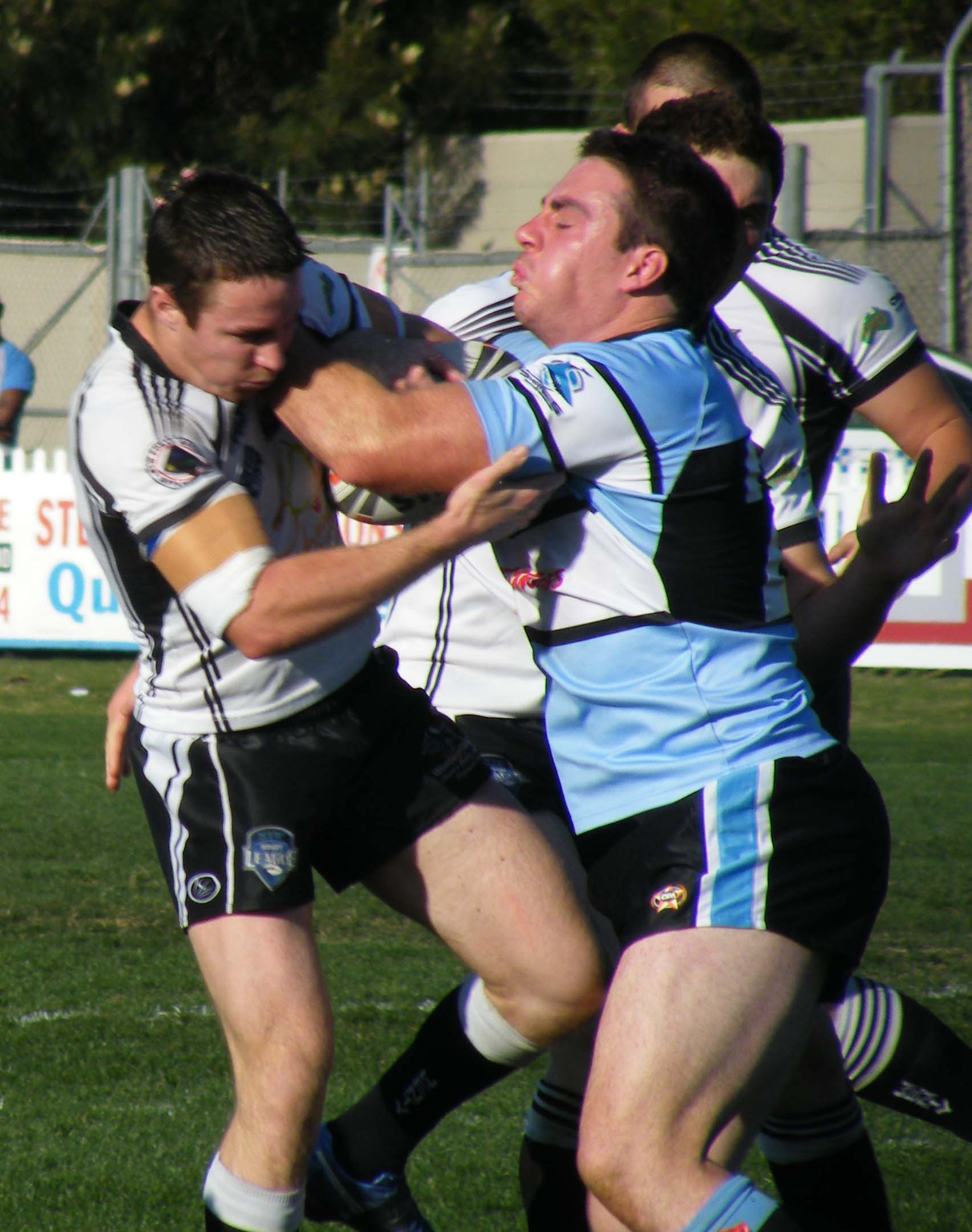
Millington being tackled by James Maloney in 2008

In the 2009 NRL season, Millington made 17 appearances for Cronulla-Sutherland as they finished 2nd last on the table.

In the 2010 NRL season, Millington played in nearly every game for Cronulla-Sutherland that year as the club finished near the bottom of the ladder.

=== Canterbury-Bankstown Bulldogs ===
In 2011, Millington joined Canterbury-Bankstown but only managed to make seven appearances before being released by the club. After Canterbury-Bankstown failed to make the NRL finals series in 2011 they agreed to release him from the remainder of his playing contract to allow him to take up a two-year deal with the Castleford Tigers in the European Super League.

=== Castleford Tigers ===
Ahead of the 2012 season, Millington joined English side Castleford on a two-year deal. He had an instant impact, making 22 appearances and scoring 4 tries in his first season.

In July 2013, Millington signed a one-year contract extension with the Tigers, with head coach Daryl Powell labelling him "a stand-out performer".

This was followed by a further contract extension in February 2014. Millington was voted as the Fan's Player of the Year for the 2014 season.

Millington was first given the number 10 shirt for 2015. He was named Directors' Player of the Year and 2nd Place Player of the Year for the 2015 season, of which he played every game.

In 2016, due to the Tigers' extensive injury list, Millington displayed his positional versatility by starting 3 games in the halves for Castleford.

Millington played a crucial role in the 2017 Castleford campaign, contributing to the Tigers' first League Leaders' Shield and Grand Final appearance. He played in the 2017 Super League Grand Final defeat to the Leeds Rhinos at Old Trafford. He was consequently named in the 2017 Super League Dream Team, and won the club's 2nd Place Player of the Year award.

Millington was named 3rd Place Player of the Year for the 2018 season.

At the Castleford Tigers 2019 end-of-season awards night, Millington picked up the Community Player of the Year title in recognition of his outstanding contribution to the local area and his hard work off the field in conjunction with the Castleford Tigers Community Foundation.

Following his excellent start to the 2020 Super League season, Castleford head coach Powell stated that "this year he's at a different level" and expressed his intention to open further contract talks with Millington. He signed a contract in October 2020 to take him through to the conclusion of the 2021 Super League season.

On 17 July 2021, he played for Castleford in their 2021 Challenge Cup Final loss against St. Helens. In August 2021, Millington announced that he would be retiring at the end of the regular season. He scored a try in his final appearance for Castleford, in a 24-38 defeat to Warrington at Wheldon Road.
