= Billy Harris (rugby league, born 1992) =

English rugby league footballer

Personal information
- Full name: Billy Harris
- Born: 6 January 1992 (age 34)

Playing information
- Weight: 90 kg (198 lb; 14 st 2 lb)
- Position: Second-row
Club
Years	Team	Pld	T	G	FG	P
	Castleford Tigers
2012(loan)	→ Dewsbury Rams	9	1	0	0	4
	Total	9	1	0	0	4

Billy Harris (born 6 January 1992) is a professional rugby league footballer who played in the 2010s. He has played for Stanley Rangers ARLFC, Castleford Tigers and Dewsbury Rams (loan), as a second-row.
