= James Parkes (rugby union) =

English rugby union player

- Born: 30 November 1980 (age 45) Chelmsford, Essex
- Height: 1.78 m (5 ft 10 in)
- Weight: 98 kg (15 st 6 lb)

Rugby union career
- Position: Hooker
Senior career
| Years | Team | Apps | (Points) |
| 2001–2004 | Saracens | | |
| 2004–2006 | Gloucester Rugby | | |
| 2006–2010 | Leeds Carnegie | 40 | (0) |

James Parkes (born 30 November 1980 in Chelmsford, Essex, England) is a former English professional Rugby union football player for Leeds Tykes. His usual position is at hooker. He retired then in 2007. But in November 2010 he was brought out of retirement to be on the bench to play Sale Sharks after an injury to Andy Titterrell. He formerly played for Gloucester Rugby and Saracens F.C.
