= Paul Jackson (rugby league) =

Scotland international rugby league footballer

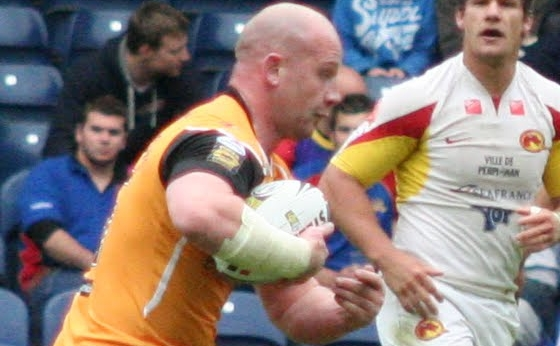

Personal information
- Full name: Paul Leslie Jackson
- Born: 29 September 1978 (age 47) Leeds, West Yorkshire, England

Playing information
- Height: 5 ft 11 in (1.80 m)
- Weight: 17 st 0 lb (108 kg)
- Position: Prop, Second-row
Club
Years	Team	Pld	T	G	FG	P
1998	Huddersfield Giants	11	0	0	0	0
1999–02	Wakefield Trinity Wildcats	98	2	0	0	8
2003–04	Castleford Tigers	27	0	0	0	0
2005–09	Huddersfield Giants	101	3	0	0	12
2010–12	Castleford Tigers	50	6	0	0	24
2013–14	Whitehaven	44	0	0	0	0
2015–16	Dewsbury Rams	20	0	0	0	0
	Total	351	11	0	0	44
Representative
Years	Team	Pld	T	G	FG	P
2006–08	Scotland	4	0	0	0	0

Paul Jackson (born 29 September 1978) is a former Scotland international rugby league footballer who played as a prop or second-row in the 1990s, 2000s and 2010s. He played at club level for the Huddersfield Giants (two spells), Wakefield Trinity Wildcats, Castleford Tigers (two spells), Whitehaven and the Dewsbury Rams.

== Background ==
Paul Jackson was born in Leeds, West Yorkshire, England.

== Playing career ==
Paul Jackson played for Huddersfield in the 2006 Challenge Cup Final as a prop against St. Helens that Huddersfield lost 12–42. He was named in the Scotland training squad for the 2008 Rugby League World Cup.

He was named in the Scotland squad for the 2008 Rugby League World Cup.

Jackson rejoined Castleford for the 2010 season. He previously played for the club in 2003 and 2004.
