= Ben Gledhill =

English rugby league and rugby union footballer

Personal information
- Full name: Ben Gledhill
- Born: 18 September 1989 (age 36) England
- Height: 6 ft 5 in (1.96 m)
- Weight: 18 st 1 lb (115 kg)

Playing information

Rugby league
- Position: Prop
Club
Years	Team	Pld	T	G	FG	P
2010–11	Wakefield Trinity Wildcats	17	0	0	0	0
2012–13	Salford City Reds	14	1	0	0	4
	Total	31	1	0	0	4

Rugby union
Club
Years	Team	Pld	T	G	FG	P
2013–15	Darlington RFC	0	0	0	0	0
- Source: rleague.com As of 10 May 2021

Ben Gledhill (born 18 September 1989) is an English rugby league footballer who played for Wakefield Trinity and Salford of Super League. He plays as a prop. Gledhill was an academy player at Castleford Tigers before joining Wakefield Trinity.

In 2013, he switched to playing rugby union for Darlington RFC, and then in April 2015 returned to play rugby league for Shaw Cross Sharks ARLFC.
