= Lee Mitchell =

English rugby league footballer

Lee "Mitch" Mitchell
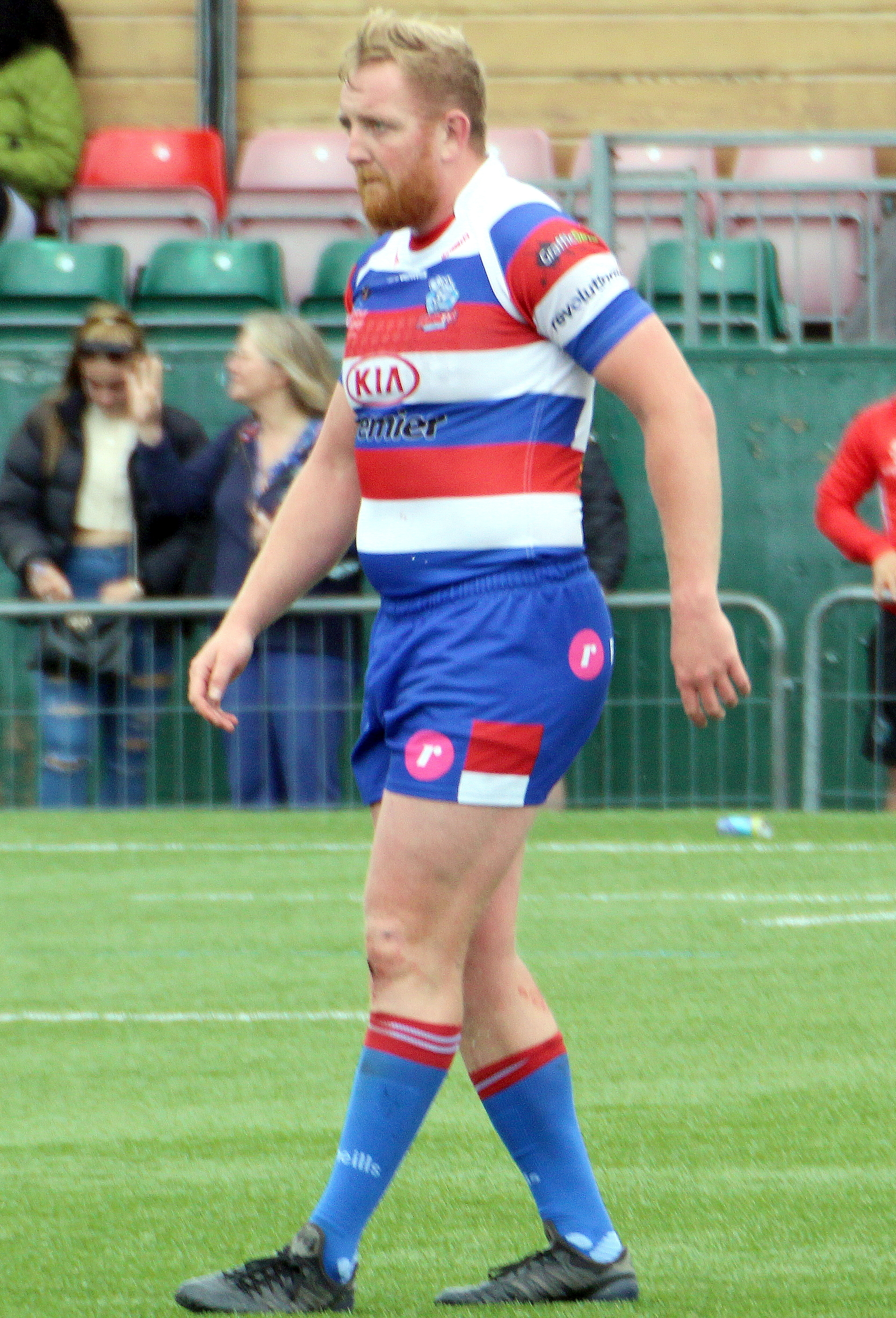

Personal information
- Full name: Lee Mitchell
- Born: 8 September 1988 (age 37) Billinge Higher End, Wigan, England
- Height: 6 ft 2 in (1.88 m)
- Weight: 14 st 13 lb (95 kg)

Playing information
- Position: Prop, Second-row, Loose forward
Club
| Years | Team | Pld | T | G | FG | P |
|---|---|---|---|---|---|---|
| 2008–11 | Warrington Wolves | 37 | 4 | 0 | 0 | 16 |
| 2010(loan) | Leigh Centurions | 14 | 7 | 0 | 0 | 28 |
| 2011(loan) | Leigh Centurions | 1 | 0 | 0 | 0 | 0 |
| 2011(loan) | → Harlequins RL | 12 | 1 | 0 | 0 | 4 |
| 2012–13 | Castleford Tigers | 23 | 2 | 0 | 0 | 8 |
| 2014 | Whitehaven | 26 | 6 | 0 | 0 | 24 |
| 2015–17 | Batley Bulldogs | 15 | 3 | 0 | 0 | 12 |
| 2015–17 | Warrington Wolves | 0 | 0 | 0 | 0 | 0 |
| 2017(loan) | → Rochdale Hornets | 16 | 0 | 0 | 0 | 0 |
| 2018–19 | Rochdale Hornets | 30 | 4 | 0 | 0 | 16 |
| | Total | 174 | 27 | 0 | 0 | 108 |
- Source: As of 7 April 2026

Lee Mitchell (born 8 September 1988) is an English former rugby league footballer who last played as a second-row forward for the Rochdale Hornets in the Championship.

He has played at club level for the Warrington Wolves, the Leigh Centurions (two spells on loan), Harlequins RL (loan), the Castleford Tigers (two spells, including one on loan), Whitehaven, the Batley Bulldogs and Rochdale Hornets (two spells, including one on loan), as a prop, second-row, or loose forward.

== Background ==
Mitchell was born in Billinge, Merseyside.

== Playing career ==
Lee Mitchell made his début for Warrington Wolves on Sunday 19 August 2007.
