= Danny Orr =

Former Great Britain and England international rugby league footballer

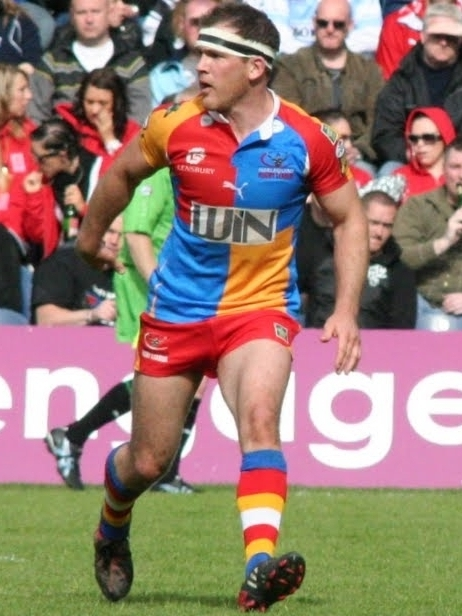

Personal information
- Full name: Daniel Crawford Orr
- Born: 17 May 1978 (age 47) Castleford, West Yorkshire, England

Playing information
- Height: 5 ft 8 in (1.73 m)
- Weight: 13 st 3 lb (84 kg)
- Position: Stand-off, Scrum-half, Hooker
Club
| Years | Team | Pld | T | G | FG | P |
|---|---|---|---|---|---|---|
| 1997–03 | Castleford Tigers | 191 | 71 | 296 | 4 | 880 |
| 2004–06 | Wigan Warriors | 74 | 20 | 14 | 0 | 108 |
| 2007–10 | Harlequins RL | 102 | 16 | 102 | 0 | 258 |
| 2011–12 | Castleford Tigers | 54 | 12 | 31 | 0 | 110 |
| | Total | 421 | 119 | 443 | 4 | 1356 |
Representative
| Years | Team | Pld | T | G | FG | P |
| 1998 | Emerging England | 1 | 0 | 0 | 0 | 0 |
| 1999 | England | 2 | 2 | 0 | 0 | 8 |
| 2002 | Great Britain | 2 | 0 | 0 | 0 | 0 |
| 2003 | Yorkshire | 3 | 0 | 11 | 0 | 22 |

Coaching information
Club
| Years | Team | Gms | W | D | L | W% |
| 2013 | Castleford Tigers | 3 | 1 | 0 | 2 | 33 |

Daniel Crawford Orr (born 17 May 1978), is an English rugby league coach and former player. He is an assistant coach for the Keighley Cougars. A Great Britain international representative stand-off or scrum-half, Orr played in the Super League for the Castleford Tigers (two spells), Harlequins RL and the Wigan Warriors.

== Background ==
Orr was born in Castleford, West Yorkshire, England.

== Domestic career ==
=== Castleford Tigers ===
A former junior player at Kippax Welfare, Orr began his professional career with the Castleford Tigers in 1997. He made it into the 2002 Super League Dream Team, before leaving in 2003 to join the Wigan Warriors.

Danny decided to leave Castleford Tigers at the end of 2003's Super League VIII, signing a 4-year deal with the Wigan Warriors. His last match for the club was against the Wigan Warriors in the last league match of 2003's Super League VIII. He said that the decision was "exceptionally difficult" but added: "I wish to make a totally clean break from Castleford and move with my family to the most famous and successful rugby league club in the world."

=== Wigan Warriors ===
The Wigan Warriors coach of the time Stuart Raper commented: "Danny is a very good all round player who will be an asset to any side and I am pleased that he has chosen Wigan. He will blend very well into our line-up."

Despite some good performances towards the end of 2006's Super League XI, the Wigan Warriors decided to allow Orr to leave. Some reports suggested Orr did not want to leave the Wigan Warriors but he was sold to Harlequins RL on 12 October 2006.

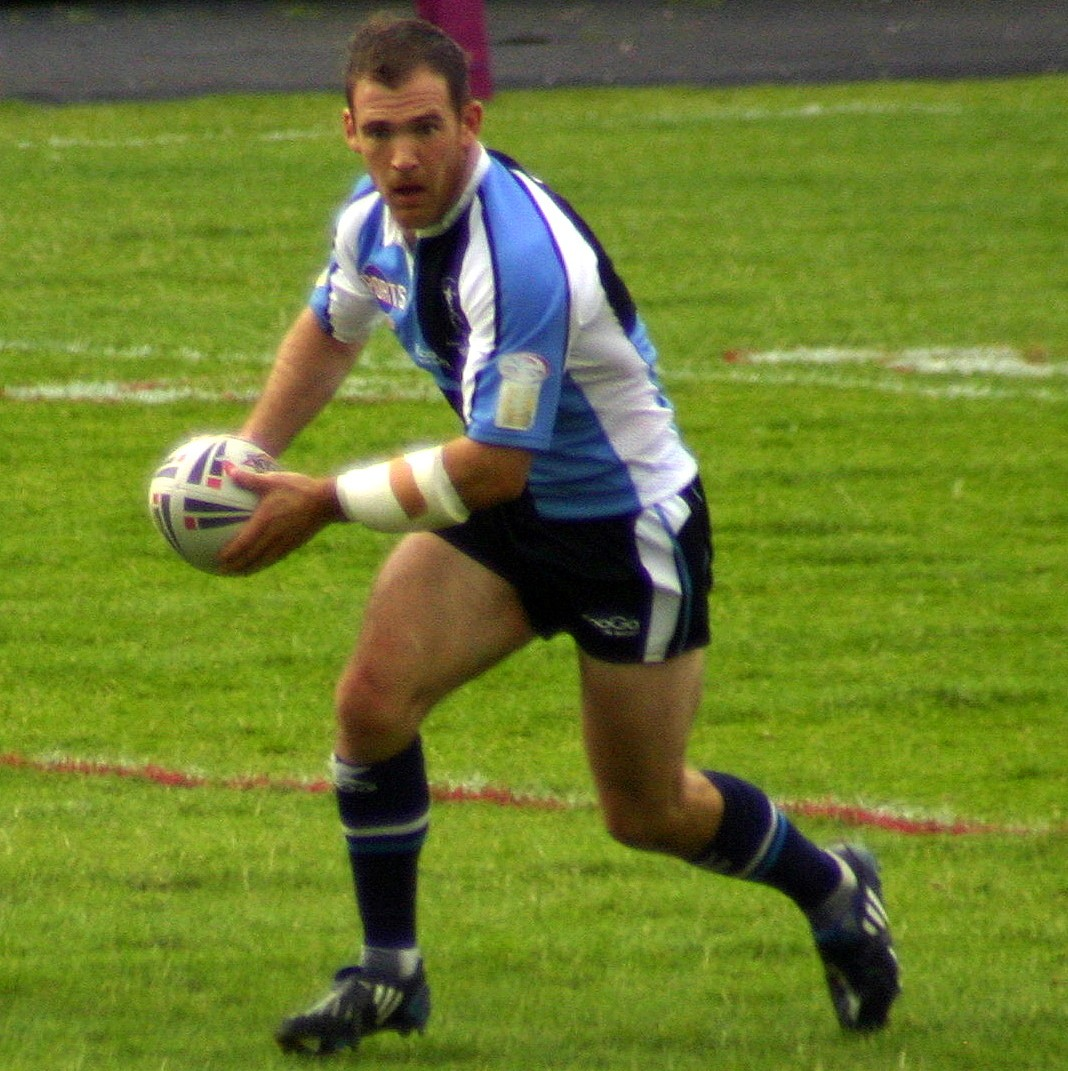
Orr in action for Harlequins RL

=== Harlequins Rugby League ===
Orr signed a three-year deal with the Harlequins RL starting in 2007 and was replaced at Wigan by Trent Barrett.

=== Return to Castleford ===
Orr rejoined his hometown club Castleford Tigers in 2011 after signing a one-year deal. In July 2011, he signed a one-year extension to his deal, keeping him at his hometown club for the 2012 season.

Danny Orr announced on Thursday 26 July 2012 that he would retire at the end of the Super League season to take up a coaching job with Castleford Tigers, thus ending his 16-year professional career.

== Representative career ==
During his period at the Castleford Tigers he gained many representative honours. In 1997, he was a member of the Great Britain Academy side coached by Mike Gregory, an acquaintance he was to re-establish after joining Wigan. He has gained senior representative experience as well, captaining Yorkshire to victory in the 2003 Origin match. He has played for England and also for Great Britain in the 2002 series against New Zealand.

== Coaching career ==
Orr was assistant coach of Castleford from 2013 to 2020. He had a short period as interim head coach in 2013 following the departure of Ian Millward. From December 2020 to the end of the 2022 season Orr was assistant coach at the Salford Red Devils.

On 13 January 2026 it was reported that he had taken up a role on the coaching staff of Keighley Cougars, following Salford Red Devils entering into administration.
