= Ryan Hudson =

English rugby league footballer

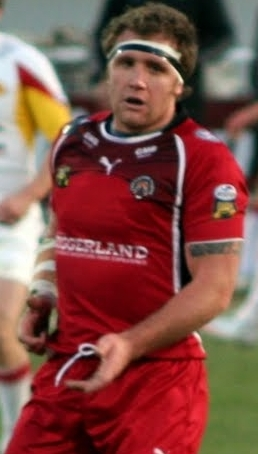

Personal information
- Full name: Ryan Lee Hudson
- Born: 20 November 1979 (age 46) Leeds, England

Playing information
- Height: 5 ft 11 in (180 cm)
- Weight: 14 st 13 lb (95 kg)
- Position: Stand-off, Hooker, Second-row, Loose forward
Club
Years	Team	Pld	T	G	FG	P
1998–99	Huddersfield Giants	19	0	0	0	0
2000–01	Wakefield Trinity Wildcats	51	12	0	1	49
2002–04	Castleford Tigers	86	24	0	0	96
2004	Bradford Bulls	0	0	0	0	0
2006–08	Huddersfield Giants	56	11	0	0	44
2009–12	Castleford Tigers	76	11	0	0	44
	Total	288	58	0	1	233
Representative
Years	Team	Pld	T	G	FG	P
2003	Yorkshire	1	0	0	0	0
2002	England (A-Team)	4	1	0	0	4
2003	Great Britain (A-Team)	1	1	0	0	4

Ryan Lee Hudson (born 20 November 1979) is an English former professional rugby league footballer who played in the 1990s, 2000s and 2010s. He played at representative level for Great Britain (A-Team), England (A-Team), and Yorkshire, and at club level for Stanley Rangers, the Huddersfield Giants (two spells), the Wakefield Trinity Wildcats, the Castleford Tigers (two spells) (captain), and the Bradford Bulls (no appearances), as a stand-off, hooker, second-row, or loose forward. He is also the brother of former Coronation Street and Wild at Heart actress Lucy-Jo Hudson.

Hudson was set to play for Bradford Bulls in 2005 but failed a substance test after taking some pain-killers abroad that contained the banned substance stanozolol. He was suspended from the game for two years; the ban expired shortly before the start of 2007's Super League XII.

== Early career ==
As a youngster, he played for amateur side Stanley Rangers, whom he later went on to coach. Whilst at the club his potential was obvious. He picked up several player of the year awards and is regarded as one of the club's finest ever products.

== International honours ==
In October 2001, Hudson was named as captain for England under-21s two-game tour against South Africa.

Ryan Hudson represented England 'A' while at Castleford playing Loose forward in the 12–34 defeat by New Zealand at Brentford F.C.'s stadium on 30 October 2002, playing Loose forward and scoring one try in the 44–8 victory over Fiji at Lautoka, Fiji on 9 November 2002, as a substitute in the 12–18 defeat by Fiji President's XIII at Suva, Fiji on 13 November 2002, and Loose forward in the 30–18 victory over Tonga at Nukuʻalofa, Tonga on 16 November 2002, and represented Great Britain 'A' playing Hooker and scoring one try in the 52–18 victory over New Zealand 'A' at Leeds Rhinos' stadium on 29 October 2003.

== County honours ==
Ryan Hudson won a cap playing Loose forward for Yorkshire while at Castleford as the captain in the 56–6 victory over Lancashire at Odsal Stadium, Bradford on 2 July 2003.

== Post-playing career ==
Outside of Rugby League, he has an endorsement deal with Maximuscle. Hudson also co-owns a gym in Castleford with former Featherstone Rovers player Jamie Field, he is also a coach at Stanley Rangers ARLFC.
