= Nick Youngquest =

Australian model and rugby league footballer (born 1983)

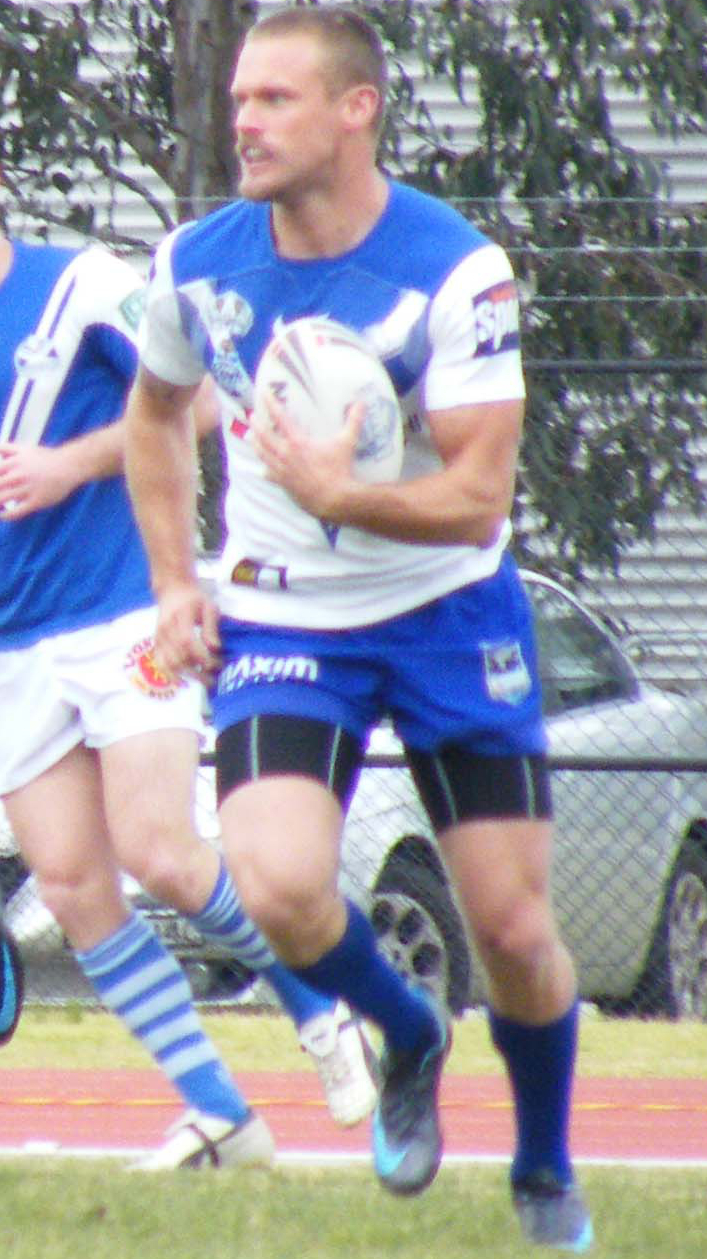

Personal information
- Full name: Nicholas Frederick Youngquest
- Born: 28 July 1983 (age 43) Sutherland, New South Wales, Australia

Playing information
- Height: 182 cm (6 ft 0 in)
- Weight: 87 kg (13 st 10 lb)
- Position: Fullback, Wing
Club
Years	Team	Pld	T	G	FG	P
2003	Cronulla Sharks	5	0	0	0	0
2004–05	St. George-Illawarra	10	6	0	0	24
2006–07	Penrith Panthers	18	9	15	0	66
2008	Canterbury Bulldogs	4	1	0	0	4
2009	Gateshead Thunder	8	6	0	0	24
2010	Crusaders RL	29	11	0	0	44
2011–12	Castleford Tigers	40	29	2	0	120
	Total	114	62	17	0	282

Coaching information
Club
Years	Team	Gms	W	D	L	W%
2014	Brooklyn Kings RLFC

Nicholas Frederick Youngquest (born 28 July 1983) is an Australian model and former professional rugby league footballer. He played in the National Rugby League for the Cronulla-Sutherland Sharks, St. George Illawarra Dragons, Penrith Panthers and the Canterbury-Bankstown Bulldogs, and in the UK for the Gateshead Thunder, Celtic Crusaders and the Castleford Tigers, mainly as a winger.

== Background ==
Youngquest was born in Sydney, New South Wales, Australia.

== Cronulla-Sutherland ==
Youngquest made his first grade debut for Cronulla-Sutherland in round 1 of the 2003 NRL season against Melbourne.

== St. George Illawarra Dragons ==
Youngquest then played for St George between 2004 and 2005. He played five games for the club in the 2005 NRL season as they finished second on the table but he did not feature in St. George's finals campaign.

== Penrith Panthers ==
Youngquest spent two seasons with Penrith in 2006 and 2007. His final year at Penrith saw the club finish last on the table and claim the wooden spoon.

== Wests Tigers ==
In late 2007, Youngquest agreed to a one-year deal with the Wests Tigers, his fourth club in six years, but failed to make the NRL squad.

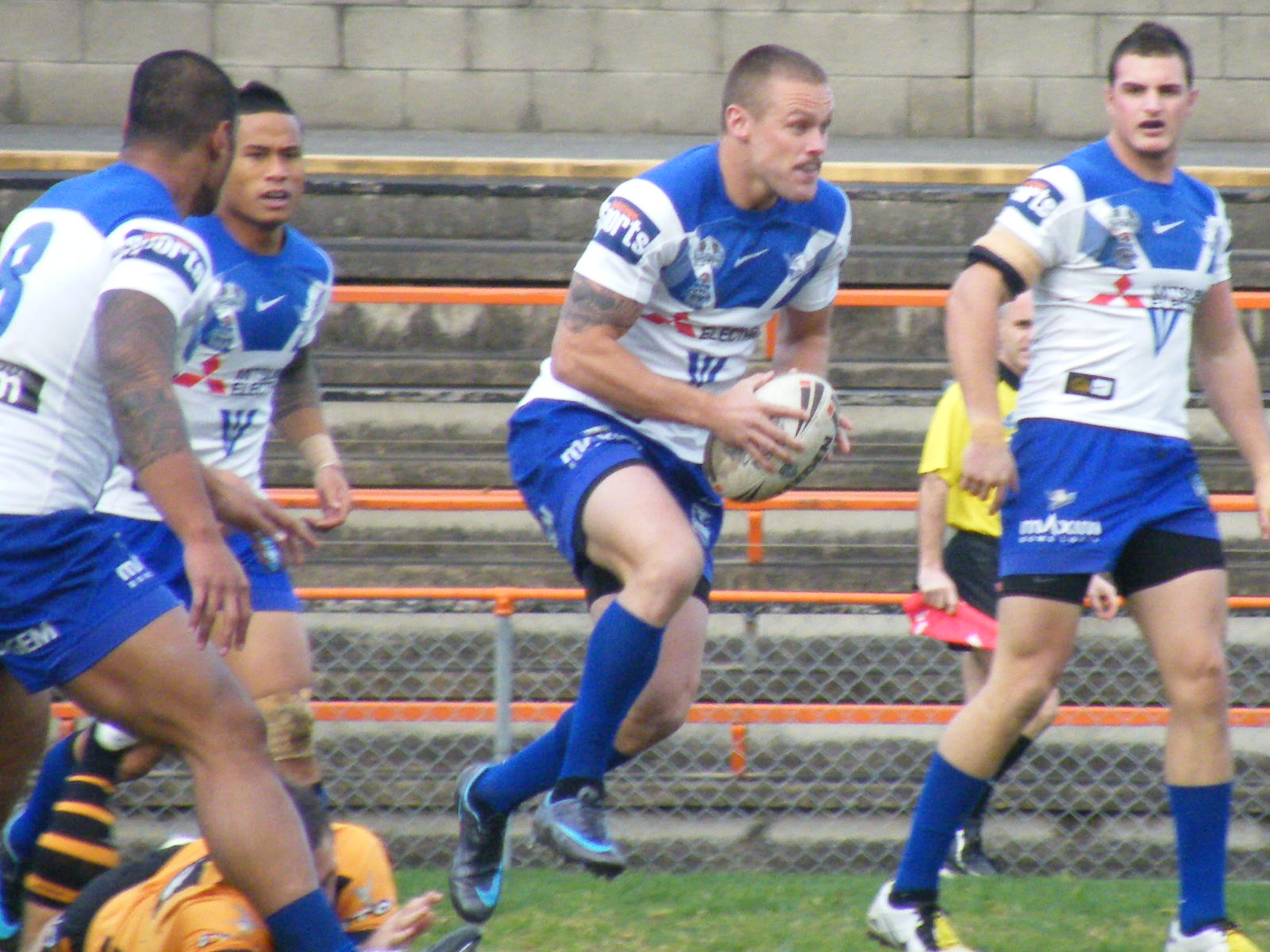
Youngquest playing for the Bulldogs in 2008

== Canterbury-Bankstown ==
Youngquest was released midway through the 2008 NRL season and signed with Canterbury as a replacement for the released Cameron Phelps. He played four games for Canterbury in the 2008 season as the club finished last on the table.

== Pia Donkeys ==
After failing to make an impact in the NRL after six seasons, Youngquest moved to play for the French rugby league team Salanque Meditérrannée PIA XIII (also known as the Pia Donkeys) following the conclusion of the 2008 NRL season.

== Gateshead Thunder ==
In 2009, Youngquest played for English Championship team Gateshead Thunder, where he caught the eye of Brian Noble, the coach for Crusaders RL.

== Crusaders RL ==
Youngquest signed with the Crusaders shortly before the start of the 2010 Super League season.

== Castleford Tigers ==
2011 brought a move to Super League team Castleford Tigers, Youngquest possibly played his best rugby there making 40 appearances and scoring 29 tries and 2 goals. Youngquest scored his last try at the last home game of the season against Catalans Dragons.

== Highlights ==
- First Grade Debut: 2003 - Round 1, Cronulla v Melbourne Storm, Toyota Park, 16 March
- First Career hat-trick 2010 - Round 24, Crusaders v. Salford City Reds, The Racecourse Ground, 1 August

== Outside rugby ==
In 2006, Youngquest posed nude for the Naked Rugby League Calendar 2007-08, stirring controversy after his revealing pose - in which one hand is placed partially over his genitalia. The NRL reacted by distancing itself from the project, stating that they do not endorse nor authorise the calendar. The sales of the calendar helped to raise funds for the National Breast Cancer Foundation. Youngquest has also worked as a professional model. He is hired by agencies Ford Models and DT Model Management, and has done advertising campaign for designer fragrances Paco Rabanne.

During his time as a professional rugby league player, Youngquest gained exposure from his involvement with a variety of charitable organizations and was featured on the cover of numerous magazines worldwide. In 2008, Youngquest was discovered by David Todd and has since been represented exclusively by DT Model Management in the U.S.

In late 2012, Youngquest decided to step away from rugby to pursue opportunities in modeling, appearing in a campaign for Abercrombie & Fitch shot by Bruce Weber. He currently resides in New York City. In 2013, he became the face of the new masculine fragrance INVICTUS by Paco Rabanne.

== Brooklyn Kings Rugby League Club ==
In 2014, Youngquest became the head coach for semi-professional rugby league club, the Brooklyn Kings RLFC, who play in the USARL. Youngquest has been developing new and older players with the goal of expanding rugby league in the United States, and as well as develop star players for team USA for the Rugby League World Cup.
