= Stuart Jones (rugby league) =

England international rugby league footballer

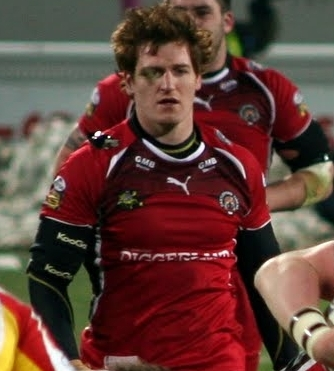

Personal information
- Full name: Stuart Jones
- Born: 7 December 1981 (age 44) Wigan, Greater Manchester, England

Playing information
- Height: 6 ft 0 in (1.82 m)
- Weight: 14 st 13 lb (95 kg)
- Position: Second-row, Loose forward
Club
Years	Team	Pld	T	G	FG	P
2002	Wigan Warriors	8	1	0	0	4
2002–03	St Helens	18	2	0	0	8
2004–08	Huddersfield Giants	118	17	0	0	68
2009–12	Castleford Tigers	101	13	0	0	52
	Total	245	33	0	0	132
Representative
Years	Team	Pld	T	G	FG	P
2004	England	1	1	0	0	4

Stuart Jones (born 7 December 1981) is an English professional rugby league footballer who has played in the 2000s and 2010s. He has played for Castleford Tigers. He has previously played for Huddersfield Giants, St Helens and Wigan Warriors. His normal position is second-row, though he can also operate at loose forward. Stuart was awarded a 2-year contract extension by Castleford in June 2009 tying him to the club until the end of the 2011 season.

Jones has represented England on one occasion in the 98–4 victory over Russia in 2004 where he scored a try.

Jones played for Huddersfield in the 2006 Challenge Cup Final from the interchange bench against St Helens but the Giants lost 12–42.
