= 2011 Castleford Tigers season =

- Super League XVI Rank: 9th
- Challenge Cup: Semi-final
- 2011 record: Wins: 15; draws: 2; losses: 14
- Points scored: For: 664; against: 808

Team information
- Stadium: Wheldon Road

Top scorers
- Tries: Rangi Chase (15)
- Goals: Kirk Dixon (102)
← 2010	List of seasons	2012 →

The 2011 Castleford Tigers season was the club's 14th year in the Super League. The club finished in 9th place, one position below the play-offs. Castleford also reached the semi-final of the Challenge Cup, but lost 8–10 against Leeds Rhinos in extra time.

== Super League table ==
Pos	Team	Pld	W	D	L	PF	PA	PD	Pts	Qualification
1	Warrington Wolves (L)	27	22	0	5	1072	401	+671	44	Play-offs
2	Wigan Warriors	27	20	3	4	852	432	+420	43	Play-offs
3	St Helens	27	17	3	7	782	515	+267	37	Play-offs
4	Huddersfield Giants	27	16	0	11	707	524	+183	32	Play-offs
5	Leeds Rhinos (C)	27	15	1	11	757	603	+154	31	Play-offs
6	Catalans Dragons	27	15	1	11	689	626	+63	31	Play-offs
7	Hull Kingston Rovers	27	14	0	13	713	692	+21	28	Play-offs
8	Hull F.C.	27	13	1	13	718	569	+149	27	Play-offs
9	Castleford Tigers	27	12	2	13	664	808	−144	26	
10	Bradford Bulls	27	9	2	16	570	826	−256	20	
11	Salford City Reds	27	10	0	17	542	809	−267	20	
12	Harlequins	27	6	1	20	524	951	−427	13	
13	Wakefield Trinity Wildcats	27	7	0	20	453	957	−504	10 (Note: Wakefield deducted 4 points for entering administration.)	
14	Crusaders	27	6	0	21	527	857	−330	8 (Note: Crusaders deducted 4 points for entering administration.)	

Source: rugbyleagueproject.org
Rules for classification: 1) Points; 2) Points difference; 3) Number of points scored;
(C) Champions; (L) League Leaders' Shield winners
