= Jordan Thompson (rugby league) =

English professional rugby league footballer

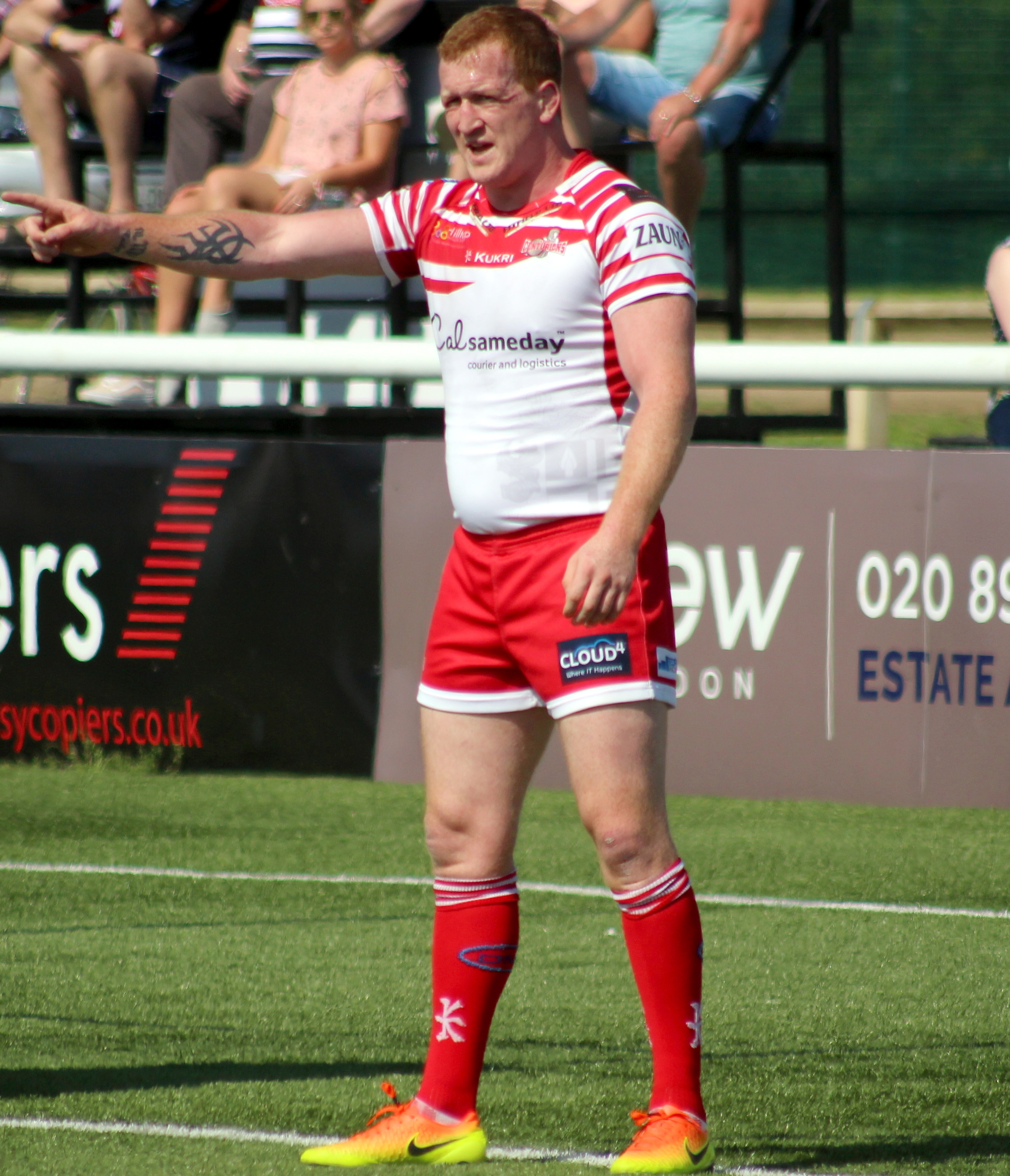

Personal information
- Full name: Jordan Thompson
- Born: 4 September 1991 (age 35) Normanton, West Yorkshire, England
- Height: 6 ft 2 in (1.88 m)
- Weight: 15 st 13 lb (101 kg)

Playing information
- Position: Second-row, Loose forward, Centre
Club
Years	Team	Pld	T	G	FG	P
2009–13	Castleford Tigers	78	28	0	0	112
2011(loan)	→ York City Knights	5	0	1	0	2
2014–17	Hull F.C.	103	12	0	0	48
2018	Leigh Centurions	26	1	0	0	4
2018	Leeds Rhinos	6	0	0	0	0
2019	Hull F.C.	12	1	0	0	4
2019–21	Leigh Centurions	28	6	0	0	24
2022–	York Knights	30	5	0	0	20
	Total	288	53	1	0	214
- Source: As of 6 September 2026

Jordan Thompson (born 4 September 1991) is a professional rugby league footballer who plays as a second-row or loose forward for the York Knights in the Super League.

He has previously played for the Castleford Tigers in the Super League, and on loan from Castleford at the York City Knights in the Championship. Thompson has also played for Hull FC, in two separate spells and the Leeds Rhinos in the Super League. He has also previously played for Leigh in the Championship. Earlier in his career he played as a centre, fullback and on the wing.

== Background ==
Thompson was born in Normanton, West Yorkshire, England.

== Early career ==
He signed for the club form local amateur side Normanton Knights.

== First team appearances ==
=== Castleford Tigers ===
Thompson made his first-team début in a 50–10 loss to St Helens in round 16 of 2009's Super League XIV, where he came on off the bench. Since this, he made his maiden start for the club in a 40–38 win at Bradford where he scored a try playing on the wing.

Jordan has made a steady start to life in the Castleford first team and has filled in at full back, wing and centre and acquitted himself well. Jordan signed a new contract until the end of the 2013 season in July 2011.

=== Hull FC ===
Jordan signed a 3-year contract with Super League club Hull F.C. in September 2013 and has been a regular in the squad all through 2014 & 2015.

=== Leigh Centurions ===
In October 2017 he joined Leigh on a 2-year deal.

=== York RLFC ===
On 18 October 2021, it was reported that he had signed for York RLFC in the RFL Championship
