= Ryan McGoldrick =

US international rugby league footballer

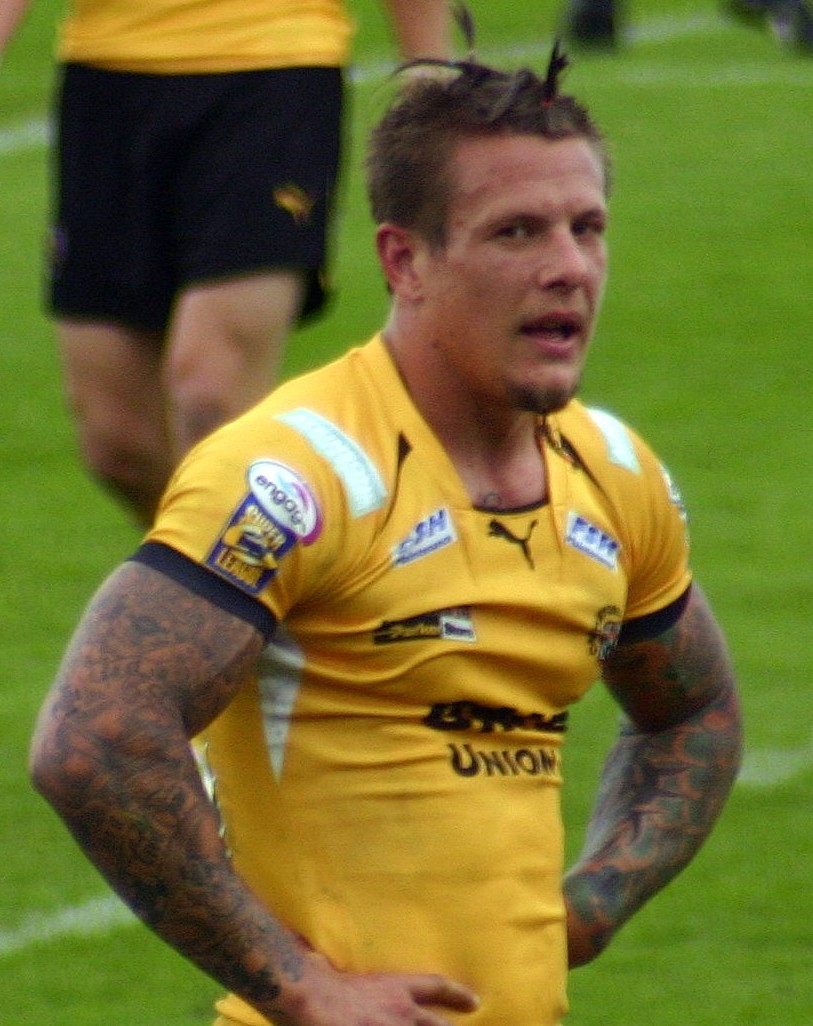

Personal information
- Born: 12 January 1981 (age 45) Cairns, Queensland, Australia
- Height: 184 cm (6 ft 0 in)
- Weight: 93 kg (14 st 9 lb)

Playing information

Rugby union
- Position: Inside centre
Club
Years	Team	Pld	T	G	FG	P
2003	New South Wales Waratahs	2	0	0	0	0

Rugby league
- Position: Loose forward, Fullback, Centre, Stand-off
Club
Years	Team	Pld	T	G	FG	P
2002–05	Cronulla Sharks	35	10	0	0	40
2006–12	Castleford Tigers	136	36	10	1	165
2012	Hull F.C.	8	1	0	0	4
2013	Salford City Reds	21	3	0	1	13
2014	Oxford RL	2	0	0	0	0
	Total	202	50	10	2	222
Representative
Years	Team	Pld	T	G	FG	P
2007	USA	2	1	0	0	4
- Source: As of 11 February 2018

Ryan McGoldrick (born 12 January 1981) is a professional rugby league footballer for the Darlington Point Coleambally Roosters in the Group 20 competition in regional New South Wales, Australia. He has previously played for the Salford City Reds, Hull FC, Castleford Tigers and the Cronulla-Sutherland Sharks, as well as representing the New South Wales Waratahs in rugby union. He is a utility player, and has played for Castleford as a full-back, centre, stand-off, scrum-half and loose forward.

== Background ==
McGoldrick was born in Cairns, Queensland, Australia.

== Early career ==
McGoldrick played junior volleyball for Wynnum Manly. He also played rugby union at the selective Brisbane State High School in Queensland.

== Rugby league career ==
McGoldrick made his First Grade début for the Cronulla-Sutherland Sharks in Round 6 v Newcastle at Toyota Park, 19 April 2002.

In 2004, McGoldrick returned to rugby league after a sting in rugby union signed with the Cronulla Sharks once again. In late 2005, Ryan was one of 12 of the hottest players in the NRL that posed for the League of Their Own 2006 calendar that was produced in the style of the famous Dieux du Stade calendars to raise money for the Koori Kids foundation.

In early 2006, Ryan was involved in a tug of war between SL club Castleford Tigers and NRL club Wests Tigers, with both clubs claiming to have agreed terms with McGoldrick. In the end, he arrived in Castleford a few days before their first match of the season. Ryan McGoldrick made his début for Castleford Tigers in 18–42 defeat by Hull on 10 February 2006. He, along with the rest of the squad, battled to keep Castleford in the top flight. Ryan suffered a hamstring injury towards the end of the 2006 season, but was forced to play due to lack of numbers. Unfortunately Castleford were relegated at the end of the season. Despite this, McGoldrick signed a 2-year contract to stay with the club until 2008. McGoldrick played for the Tigers during the 2007 season, and was initially used in his less-preferred position of stand-off, which seemed to unsettle him. However, as the season progressed, he managed to move into the centre role and began to show fantastic form as Castleford won promotion back to Super League.

McGoldrick moved to full back for the 2008 season and showed good form, which led to him earning a new four-year contract at Castleford.

McGoldrick was named captain of the side on occasion in 2009 following injuries to key players, and he has continued to play a utility role for the club. McGoldrick left the club after 7 years in July 2012 after handing in a transfer request. He joined Hull FC on a short-term deal until the end of the 2012 season.

McGoldrick has signed for Salford City Reds for the 2013 Super League Campaign.

On Tuesday 12 April 2016 McGoldrick attempted to sell himself on a per-game basis on eBay, the listing was removed when as eBay stated... "goes against their terms of selling body parts and remains".

== Rugby union career ==
Changing football codes, Ryan represented the New South Wales Waratahs in rugby union during 2003.

== International career ==
McGoldrick qualified for the United States national rugby league team due to parentage. Ryan McGoldrick represented the United States making his début playing Stand-off in the 0–70 defeat by Cumbria at Barrow's stadium on 4 November 2007, and Stand-off scoring 1-try in the 10–42 defeat by Samoa at Widnes' stadium on 9 November 2007. He again represented USA in the 2013 Rugby League World Cup qualifying, where he featured in the victory over Jamaica that secured USA's spot at the tournament.
