= Craig Huby =

English rugby league footballer & coach

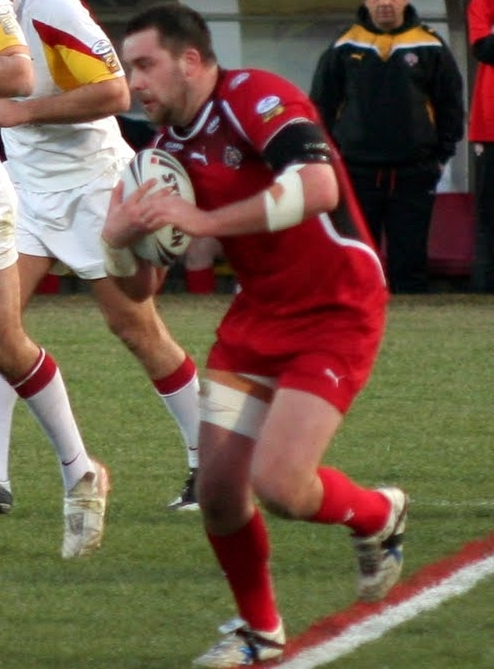

Personal information
- Full name: Craig Huby
- Born: 27 March 1986 (age 40) Pontefract, West Yorkshire, England
- Height: 6 ft 2 in (188 cm)
- Weight: 16 st 10 lb (106 kg)

Playing information
- Position: Prop
Club
Years	Team	Pld	T	G	FG	P
2003–14	Castleford Tigers	199	30	45	0	210
2015–16	Huddersfield Giants	47	2	0	0	8
2017–19	Wakefield Trinity	51	3	0	0	12
	Total	297	35	45	0	230

Coaching information
Club
Years	Team	Gms	W	D	L	W%
2027–	Newcastle Thunder	0	0	0	0
- Source: As of 3 November 2026

Craig Huby (born 27 March 1986) was an English professional rugby league coach who is the head coach of the Newcastle Thunder in the RFL Championship and a former professional rugby league footballer.

He has previously played as a prop for Wakefield Trinity and the Huddersfield Giants in the Super League, and spent 11 years with the Castleford Tigers, playing in the Super League and the second tier of English rugby league.

== Background ==
Huby was born in Pontefract, West Yorkshire, England in 1986.

== Playing career ==
=== Castleford Tigers ===
He made his début for his hometown club, Castleford Tigers, against Leeds Rhinos as a 17-year-old in May 2003. He established himself as a regular first-team player in the 2005 National League season and his good form of that season continued in the Super League 2006. He suffered a number of injuries in the promotion-winning season of 2007 but was a key member of the side in 2008. In May 2008, Huby signed a three-year extension to his contract, and, in March 2011, by then Castleford’s longest serving player, he signed a further three-year contract. A fractured kneecap, suffered in a match against St Helens in April 2011, ruled him out of the game for almost a year; he made his comeback against Featherstone in April 2012. He was granted a testimonial after ten years in the senior team with a game against Halifax on Boxing Day 2013.

He played in the 2014 Challenge Cup Final defeat by the Leeds Rhinos at Wembley Stadium, two weeks after dislocating his elbow in the semifinal against the Widnes Vikings.

=== Huddersfield Giants ===
In September 2014, Huby joined the Huddersfield Giants on a four-year contract. He played in every game for Huddersfield during the 2015 season but suffered a broken wrist in training in December 2015 that required surgery and led to him missing the start of the 2016 season.

=== Wakefield Trinity ===
He was allowed to leave in December 2016 and joined Wakefield Trinity on a three-year contract. A bad shoulder injury suffered during a match in February 2019 led to a lengthy layoff and Huby left Wakefield Trinity by mutual consent in July 2019.

== Coaching ==
=== Newcastle Thunder ===
On 21 October 2026 it was reported that he had taken the role of head-coach for Newcastle Thunder in the RFL Championship
