= Michael Wainwright (rugby league) =

English rugby league footballer

Michael Wainwright…
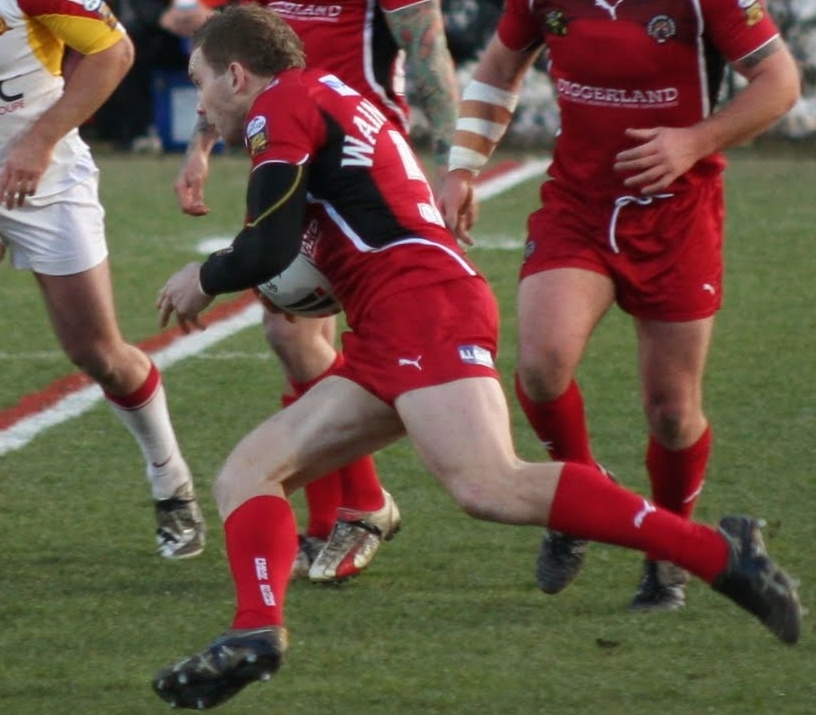

Personal information
- Full name: Michael Wainwright…
- Born: 4 November 1980 (age 45) Morley, West Yorkshire, England

Playing information
- Position: Wing
Club
Years	Team	Pld	T	G	FG	P
2001	Hunslet Hawks	30	10	0	0	40
2002–03	Dewsbury Rams	59	25	0	0	100
2004–05	Wakefield Trinity Wildcats	31	8	0	0	32
2006	Batley Bulldogs	26	7	0	0	28
2007–10	Castleford Tigers	104	40	0	0	120
2011–12	Dewsbury Rams	38	12	0	0	48
	Total	288	102	0	0	368

Michael Wainwright (born 4 November 1980) is an English former rugby league footballer who played on the wing. He played for Hunslet Hawks, Dewsbury Rams, Wakefield Trinity Wildcats, Batley Bulldogs and spent four seasons with Castleford Tigers.

== Playing career ==
Wainwright made his senior debut for Hunslet Hawks after being signed from Leeds in 2001. He signed a one-year contract to stay with the Castleford Tigers for the 2009 season. Wainwright was not in the starting line-up at the start of the 2009 season. Later he was called back into the side due to injuries, and gave some solid performances. He was awarded a new contract for the 2010 season. Wainwright played with Castleford through 2010. He was released by Castleford after over 100 appearances for the club. He later joined Dewsbury for the 2011 season.
