= Kirk Dixon =

English rugby league & union footballer

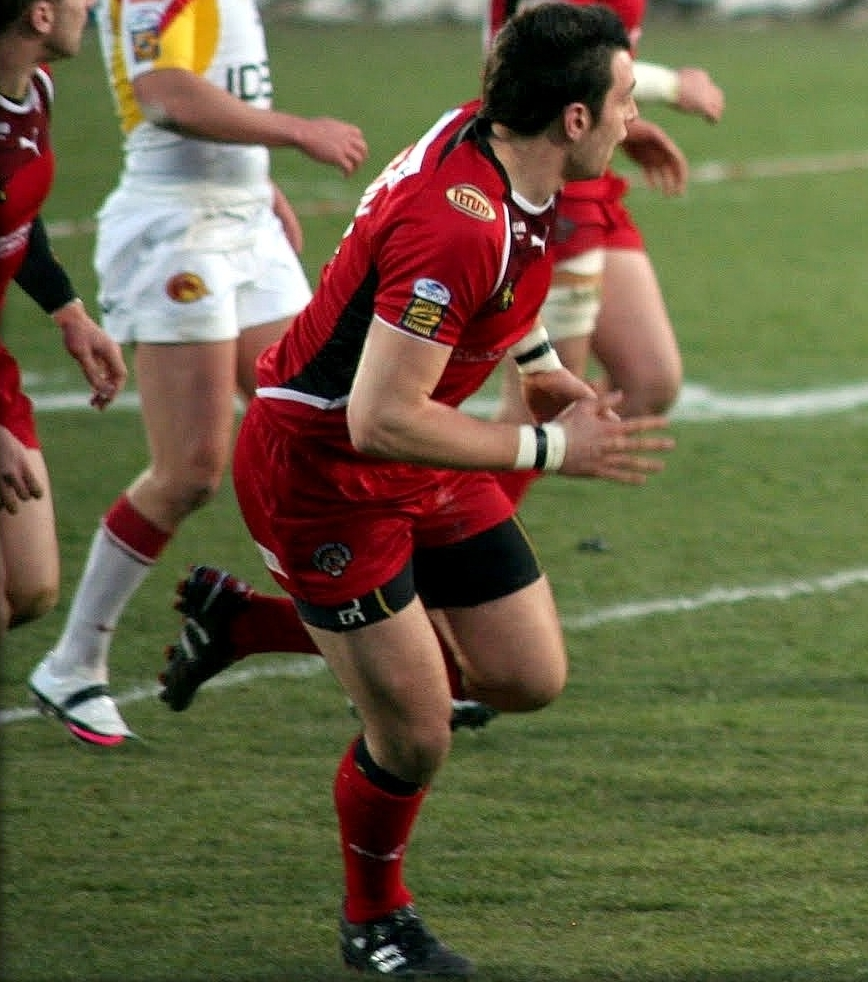

Personal information
- Full name: Kirk Dixon
- Born: 19 July 1984 (age 41) Kingston upon Hull, Humberside, England

Playing information
- Height: 6 ft 2 in (1.87 m)
- Weight: 15 st 6 lb (98 kg)

Rugby union
- Position: Wing, Outside centre
Club
Years	Team	Pld	T	G	FG	P
199?–03	Hull Ionians
2006	Northampton Saints
	Total	0	0	0	0	0

Rugby league
- Position: Centre, Wing
Club
Years	Team	Pld	T	G	FG	P
2004–06	Hull FC	17	6	4	0	32
2007–14	Castleford Tigers	160	72	308	0	904
	Total	177	78	312	0	936

Kirk Dixon (born 19 July 1984), also known by the nickname of "Dicko", is an English former professional rugby league footballer who played as a centre or wing for Hull FC and the Castleford Tigers in the Super League.

== Career ==
Dixon was born in Hull and played rugby union for Hull Ionians before starting his rugby league career with Hull FC He briefly played rugby union for Northampton Saints before joining Castleford Tigers in October 2006 on a one-year contract. Castleford manager Mick Robinson said: "Kirk is another player with Super league experience who has a lot to offer us. He has good vision and is a real try poacher." Dixon scored 23 tries in the 2007 season, helping Castleford to promotion, and signed a two-year contract in October 2007.

Dixon was given a new two-year deal following some good form in 2009. He finished the club's top try scorer in this season. He won the coaches player of the year for 2009. He suffered a blood clot in 2009 that ruled him out for six months.

Dixon signed a three-year contract in July 2011, until the end of the 2014 season. A shoulder injury suffered in the Challenge Cup semi-final in August 2011 ended his season. A neck injury ruled Dixon out for seven months in 2012.

Dixon missed the start of the 2013 season with a calf injury but scored 11 tries in 21 games and signed a one-year extension to his contract in February 2014. Daryl Powell described him as "...the ultimate professional [who] works harder than anyone".

He played in the 2014 Challenge Cup Final defeat by the Leeds Rhinos at Wembley Stadium.

Prior to the start of the 2015 season, Dixon announced his retirement following surgery to his neck. He had scored 70 tries and 269 goals in 158 Super League games, and scored more than 1,000 points for Castleford.
