= List of Super League seasons =

Super League
- Most recent season or competition: 2025 Super League season
- Sport: Rugby league
- Founded: 1996; 30 years ago
- No. of teams: 14
- Countries: England; France
- Most recent champions: Hull Kingston Rovers (1st title)
- Most titles: St Helens (10 titles)
- Relegation to: Championship
- Domestic cup: Challenge Cup
- International cup: World Club Challenge

The Super League is the top tier rugby league competition for teams in Great Britain. It was formed in 1996 replacing the Rugby Football League First Division which was the top tier in Britain from 1895 to 1996.

Since 1998, the winner of the Super League has been determined by a play-off series at the end of each season, culminating in a Grand Final at the Old Trafford. Five teams have won the Grand Final during the history of the Super League, with Hull Kingston Rovers being the current holders. St Helens are the most successful team in the Super League era, with ten titles. In the first two seasons of Super League, the champion was determined by league position at the end of the season.

The participants of the play-off series are determined by the league position of teams at the end of the regular season. The team at the top the Super League table at the end of the regular season are awarded with the League Leaders' Shield. Hull Kingston Rovers are the current holders of the League Leaders' Shield, while St Helens hold the record for most Shields with nine. (Note: This figure includes St Helens' first-placed finish in 2002 which took place before the League Leaders' Shield trophy began being awarded.) The League Leaders have been recognised with their own trophy since 2003.

== Seasons ==
=== Team performances ===
==== Season overview ====
Year	Champions	League Leaders	Relegated	Promoted
1996	St Helens (Note: Champions decided by league table) (1)		Workington	Salford
1997	Bradford (1)		Oldham; Paris St Germain (Note: Elected in/out of the league without promotion/relegation via league performance)	Hull F.C. Huddersfield
1998	Wigan (1)	Wigan (1)	None	Gateshead; Wakefield
1999	St Helens (2)	Bradford (1)	None	None
2000	St Helens (3)	Wigan (2)	None	None
2001	Bradford (2)	Bradford (2)	Huddersfield	Widnes
2002	St Helens (4)	St Helens (1)	Salford	Huddersfield
2003	Bradford (3)	Bradford (3)	Halifax	Salford
2004	Leeds (1)	Leeds (1)	Castleford	Leigh
2005	Bradford (4)	St Helens (2)	Leigh; Widnes	Castleford; Catalans
2006	St Helens (5)	St Helens (3)	Castleford	Hull KR
2007	Leeds (2)	St Helens (4)	Salford	Castleford
2008	Leeds (3)	St Helens (5)	None	Crusaders; Salford
2009	Leeds (4)	Leeds (2)	None	None
2010	Wigan (2)	Wigan (3)	None	None
2011	Leeds (5)	Warrington (1)	Crusaders	Widnes
2012	Leeds (6)	Wigan (4)	None	None
2013	Wigan (3)	Huddersfield (1)	None	None
2014	St Helens (6)	St Helens (6)	Bradford; London	None
2015	Leeds (7)	Leeds (3)	None	None
2016	Wigan (4)	Warrington (2)	Hull KR	Leigh
2017	Leeds (8)	Castleford (1)	Leigh	Hull KR
2018	Wigan (5)	St Helens (7)	Widnes	London
2019	St Helens (7)	St Helens (8)	London	Toronto
2020	St Helens (8)	Wigan (5)	Toronto	Leigh
2021	St Helens (9)	Catalans (1)	Leigh	Toulouse
2022	St Helens (10)	St Helens (9)	Toulouse	Leigh
2023	Wigan (6)	Wigan (6)	Wakefield	London
2024	Wigan (7)	Wigan (7)	London	Wakefield
2025	Hull KR (1)	Hull KR (1)	Salford	Bradford; Toulouse; York

==== Grand Finals ====
Year	Champions	Score	Runner up	Venue	Attendance
1998	Wigan	10–4	Leeds	Old Trafford	43,533
1999	St Helens	8–6	Bradford	Old Trafford	▲50,717
2000	St Helens	29–16	Wigan	Old Trafford	▲58,132
2001	Bradford	37–6	Wigan	Old Trafford	▲60,164
2002	St Helens	19–18	Bradford	Old Trafford	▲61,138
2003	Bradford	25–12	Wigan	Old Trafford	▲65,537
2004	Leeds	16–8	Bradford	Old Trafford	▲65,547
2005	Bradford	15–6	Leeds	Old Trafford	▲65,728
2006	St Helens	26–4	Hull F.C.	Old Trafford	▲72,575
2007	Leeds	33–6	St Helens	Old Trafford	▼71,352
2008	Leeds	24–16	St Helens	Old Trafford	▼68,810
2009	Leeds	18–10	St Helens	Old Trafford	▼63,259
2010	Wigan	22–10	St Helens	Old Trafford	▲71,526
2011	Leeds	32–16	St Helens	Old Trafford	▼69,107
2012	Leeds	26–18	Warrington	Old Trafford	▲70,676
2013	Wigan	30–16	Warrington	Old Trafford	▼66,281
2014	St Helens	14–6	Wigan	Old Trafford	▲70,102
2015	Leeds	22–20	Wigan	Old Trafford	▲73,512
2016	Wigan	12–6	Warrington	Old Trafford	▼70,202
2017	Leeds	24–6	Castleford	Old Trafford	▲72,827
2018	Wigan	12–4	Warrington	Old Trafford	▼64,892
2019	St Helens	23–6	Salford	Old Trafford	▼64,102
2020	St Helens	8–4	Wigan	KCOM Stadium	▼0 (Note: Behind closed doors due to COVID-19 restrictions)
2021	St Helens	12–10	Catalans	Old Trafford	▲45,177
2022	St Helens	24–12	Leeds	Old Trafford	▲60,783
2023	Wigan	10–2	Catalans	Old Trafford	▼58,137
2024	Wigan	9–2	Hull KR	Old Trafford	▲68,173
2025	Hull KR	24–6	Wigan	Old Trafford	▲68,853

=== Individual performances ===
==== Top scorers ====
Year	Tries			Points		
Year	Player	Club	Tries	Player	Club	Points
1996	Paul Newlove	St. Helens	28	Bobbie Goulding	St. Helens	257
1997	Nigel Vagana	Warrington	17	Andrew Farrell	Wigan	243
1998	Anthony Sullivan	St. Helens	20	Iestyn Harris	Leeds	255
1999	Matt Daylight & Toa Kohe-Love	Gateshead & Warrington	25	Iestyn Harris	Leeds	325
2000	Sean Long, Tommy Martyn & Darren Rogers	St. Helens, St. Helens & Castleford	20	Sean Long	St. Helens	352
2001	Kris Radlinski	Wigan	27	Andrew Farrell	Wigan	388
2002	Dennis Moran	London	22	Paul Deacon	Bradford	301
2003	Dennis Moran	London	24	Paul Deacon	Bradford	286
2004	Lesley Vainikolo	Bradford	36	Kevin Sinfield	Leeds	277
2005	Mark Calderwood	Leeds	27	Paul Deacon	Bradford	326
2006	Justin Murphy	Catalans	25	Jamie Lyon	St. Helens	318
2007	Henry Fa'afili	Warrington	21	Pat Richards	Wigan	248
2008	Ade Gardner	St. Helens	26	Pat Richards	Wigan	269
2009	Ryan Hall	Leeds	28	Michael Dobson	Hull KR	238
2010	Pat Richards	Wigan	29	Pat Richards	Wigan	388
2011	Sam Tomkins	Wigan	26	Brett Hodgson	Warrington	310
2012	Josh Charnley	Wigan	31	Scott Dureau	Catalans	277
2013	Josh Charnley	Wigan	30	Danny Brough	Huddersfield	283
2014	Joel Monaghan	Warrington	28	Marc Sneyd	Castleford	224
2015	Jermaine McGillvary	Huddersfield	27	Luke Gale	Castleford	247
2016	Denny Solomona	Castleford	40	Luke Gale	Castleford	262
2017	Greg Eden	Castleford	38	Luke Gale	Castleford	317
2018	Ben Barba	St. Helens	28	Danny Richardson	St. Helens	287
2019	Tommy Makinson	St. Helens	23	Lachlan Coote	St. Helens	247
2020	Ash Handley	Leeds	15	Lachlan Coote	St. Helens	152
2021	Ken Sio	Salford	19	James Maloney	Catalans	227
2022	Bevan French	Wigan	31	Tommy Makinson	St. Helens	230
2023	Tom Johnstone & Abbas Miski	Catalans & Wigan	27	Stefan Ratchford	Warrington	200
2024	Liam Marshall	Wigan	27	Mikey Lewis	Hull KR	216
2025	Lewis Martin	Hull F.C.	25	Max Jowitt & Arthur Mourgue	Wakefield & Hull KR	194

==== Man of Steel ====
The Man of Steel Award is given to the Super League Player of the Season. Various methods of determining the seasons best player have been employed throughout the awards history. The current method involves points being designated to players by a select panel following each fixture. The award is also known as the Steve Prescott Man of Steel, posthumously named after the former St Helens player who established the Steve Prescott Foundation to raise money for cancer research whilst fighting his own battle with cancer, which he tragically lost in 2013.

Year	Nat	Player	Club
1996	(England)	Andy Farrell	Wigan
1997	(England)	James Lowes	Bradford
1998	(Wales)	Iestyn Harris	Leeds
1999	(Australia)	Adrian Vowles	Castleford
2000	(England)	Sean Long	St. Helens
2001	(England)	Paul Sculthorpe	St. Helens
2002	(England)	Paul Sculthorpe	St. Helens
2003	(England)	Jamie Peacock	Bradford
2004	(England)	Andy Farrell	Wigan
2005	(Australia)	Jamie Lyon	St. Helens
2006	(England)	Paul Wellens	St. Helens
2007	(England)	James Roby	St. Helens
2008	(England)	James Graham	St. Helens
2009	(Australia)	Brett Hodgson	Huddersfield
2010	(Ireland)	Pat Richards	Wigan
2011	(England)	Rangi Chase	Castleford
2012	(England)	Sam Tomkins	Wigan
2013	(Scotland)	Danny Brough	Huddersfield
2014	(England)	Daryl Clark	Castleford
2015	(England)	Zak Hardaker	Leeds
2016	(England)	Danny Houghton	Hull F.C.
2017	(England)	Luke Gale	Castleford
2018	(Australia)	Ben Barba	St. Helens
2019	(Australia)	Jackson Hastings	Salford
2020	(England)	Paul McShane	Castleford
2021	(England)	Sam Tomkins	Catalans
2022	(Australia)	Brodie Croft	Salford
2023	(Australia)	Bevan French	Wigan
2024	(England)	Mikey Lewis	Hull KR
2025	(England)	Jake Connor	Leeds

==== Harry Sunderland Trophy / Rob Burrow Award winner ====
The Harry Sunderland Trophy was awarded to the Man of the Match of the Super League Grand Final. The award predated the Super League and was previously awarded to the Man of the Match of the Rugby League Premiership Final. From the 2024 season, the honour was renamed to the Rob Burrow Award in tribute to the former Leeds and Great Britain scrum-half who had raised awareness and funds for charity after being diagnosed with motor neuron disease.

Year	Nat	Player	Club
1996	(England)	Andrew Farrell (Note: Award won in a Premiership Final inside the Super League Era)	Wigan
1997	(England)	Andrew Farrell	Wigan
1998	(England)	Jason Robinson	Wigan
1999	(New Zealand)	Henry Paul (Note: Won the award despite playing for the losing team in the final)	Bradford
2000	(England)	Chris Joynt	St. Helens
2001	(Australia)	Michael Withers	Bradford
2002	(England)	Paul Deacon	Bradford
2003	(England)	Stuart Reardon	Bradford
2004	(England)	Matt Diskin	Leeds
2005	(England)	Leon Pryce	Bradford
2006	(England)	Paul Wellens	St. Helens
2007	(England)	Rob Burrow	Leeds
2008	(England)	Lee Smith	Leeds
2009	(England)	Kevin Sinfield	Leeds
2010	(New Zealand)	Thomas Leuluai	Wigan
2011	(England)	Rob Burrow	Leeds
2012	(England)	Kevin Sinfield	Leeds
2013	(Australia)	Blake Green	Wigan
2014	(England)	James Roby	St. Helens
2015	(England)	Danny McGuire	Leeds
2016	(England)	Liam Farrell	Wigan
2017	(England)	Danny McGuire	Leeds
2018	(England)	Stefan Ratchford	Warrington
2019	(England)	Luke Thompson	St. Helens
2020	(England)	James Roby	St. Helens
2021	(Fiji)	Kevin Naiqama	St. Helens
2022	(England)	Jonny Lomax	St. Helens
2023	(England)	Jake Wardle	Wigan
2024	(Australia)	Bevan French	Wigan
2025	(England)	Mikey Lewis	Hull KR

=== League structure ===
Throughout the history of Super League, the competition has been structured in various formats effecting awarding of championships, participation in play-off series, and inclusion in the league itself.

Year	No. teams	Champions	Play-offs	Relegation
1996	12	League position	None	League position: Bottom place relegated to First Division
1997	12	League position	None	League position: Bottom place relegated to First Division
1998	12	Grand Final	Top 5	No relegation
1999	14	Grand Final	Top 5	No relegation
2000	12	Grand Final	Top 5	No relegation
2001	12	Grand Final	Top 5	League position: Bottom place relegated to National League One
2002	12	Grand Final	Top 6	League position: Bottom place relegated to National League One
2003	12	Grand Final	Top 6	League position: Bottom place relegated to National League One
2004	12	Grand Final	Top 6	League position: Bottom place relegated to National League One
2005	12	Grand Final	Top 6	League position: Bottom two relegated to National League One (Note: Two teams relegated rather than one to allow Catalans to join in 2006)
2006	12	Grand Final	Top 6	League position: Bottom place relegated to National League One (Note: Catalans exempt from relegation for their first two seasons in Super League)
2007	12	Grand Final	Top 6	League position: Bottom place relegated to National League One
2008	12	Grand Final	Top 6	Licensing: Participating clubs decided by centrally awarded licenses
2009	14	Grand Final	Top 8	Licensing: Participating clubs decided by centrally awarded licenses
2010	14	Grand Final	Top 8	Licensing: Participating clubs decided by centrally awarded licenses
2011	14	Grand Final	Top 8	Licensing: Participating clubs decided by centrally awarded licenses
2012	14	Grand Final	Top 8	Licensing: Participating clubs decided by centrally awarded licenses
2013	14	Grand Final	Top 8	Licensing: Participating clubs decided by centrally awarded licenses
2014	14	Grand Final	Top 8	League position: Bottom two relegated to Championship (Note: Two teams relegated to transition to a 12-team league)
2015	12 (Note: Reducing to 8 teams in the Super League Super 8s partway through the season, with the bottom 4 competing in The Qualifiers)	Grand Final	Super 8s: Top 4	Super 8s Qualifiers: Bottom three and Million Pound Game losers relegated to Championship
2016	12	Grand Final	Super 8s: Top 4	Super 8s Qualifiers: Bottom three and Million Pound Game losers relegated to Championship
2017	12	Grand Final	Super 8s: Top 4	Super 8s Qualifiers: Bottom three and Million Pound Game losers relegated to Championship
2018	12	Grand Final	Super 8s: Top 4	Super 8s Qualifiers: Bottom three and Million Pound Game losers relegated to Championship
2019	12	Grand Final	Top 5	League position: Bottom place relegated to Championship
2020	12 (Note: Reduced to 11 following the withdrawal of Toronto midseason)	Grand Final	Top 6 (Note: Play-off structure amended due to COVID-19 disruption)	No relegation (Note: Relegation was cancelled due to significant financial and operational challenges caused by COVID-19 disruption)
2021	12	Grand Final	Top 6	League position: Bottom place relegated to Championship
2022	12	Grand Final	Top 6	League position: Bottom place relegated to Championship
2023	12	Grand Final	Top 6	League position: Bottom place relegated to Championship
2024	12	Grand Final	Top 6	IMG Grading: Clubs graded and ranked annually with top 12 eligible for Super League
2025	12	Grand Final	Top 6	IMG Grading: Clubs graded and ranked annually with top 12 eligible for Super League

== See also ==
- Super League
- Super League Grand Final
- Man of Steel
- Harry Sunderland Trophy
- Rugby Football League Championship First Division
- List of British Rugby League Champions
