= 2018 Super League season =

British rugby league season

Super League XXIII
- League: Super League
- Duration: 30 Rounds
- Teams: 12
- Highest attendance: 23,246; Leeds Rhinos Vs Castleford Tigers (23 March)
- Lowest attendance: 2,248; Salford Red Devils Vs Widnes Vikings (15 June)
- Average attendance: 8,547
- Total attendance: 1,166,425
- Broadcast partners: Sky Sports; BBC Sport; Fox League beIN Sports; Fox Soccer Plus; Sport Klub

2018 season
- Champions: Wigan Warriors; 5th Super League Title; 22nd British title
- League Leaders Shield: St. Helens
- Runners-up: Warrington Wolves
- Biggest home win: Warrington Wolves 80–10 Hull F.C. (30 August)
- Biggest away win: Salford Red Devils 10–60 St. Helens (26 April)
- Man of Steel: (Australia) Ben Barba
- Top point-scorer: (England) Danny Richardson (296)
- Top try-scorer: (Australia) Ben Barba (28)

Promotion and relegation
- Promoted from Championship: London Broncos
- Relegated to Championship: Widnes Vikings

Super League XXIII, known as the Betfred Super League XXIII for sponsor reasons, was the 23rd season of the Super League and 124th season of rugby league in Britain for 2018.

Wigan Warriors were crowned champions after beating Warrington Wolves 12-4 to win their 22nd league Championship.

Twelve teams competed over 23 rounds, including the Magic Weekend.

This season also saw the first Super League game played outside Europe, as Wigan Warriors faced Hull F.C. at WIN Stadium in Wollongong, Australia on Saturday 10 February 2018, which Wigan won, 24–10.

St. Helens won the League Leaders Shield for a record 6th time. However, they failed to reach the Grand Final after losing their semi final 13-18 to Warrington Wolves.

Widnes Vikings were relegated to the Championship, after only 3 wins in the regular season and one win in The Qualifiers, while London Broncos were promoted after winning the Million Pound Game by beating Toronto Wolfpack 4–2.

== Teams ==
Eleven teams in Super League are from the North of England. Five teams hail from the historic county of Lancashire, west of the Pennines: Warrington, St. Helens, Salford, Wigan, and Widnes. Six teams hail from the historic county of Yorkshire, east of the Pennines: Huddersfield, Wakefield Trinity, Leeds, Castleford, Hull KR and Hull FC. Catalans Dragons, located in Perpignan, France, are the only team outside the North of England. St Helens, Wigan Warriors, Warrington Wolves, and Leeds Rhinos are the only teams to have played in every season of Super League since 1996.

Hull KR were promoted from the Championship after finishing in 2nd place in The Qualifiers for 2017 whilst Leigh were relegated to the Championship after losing the 2017 Million Pound Game to Catalans.

Locations of Super League XXIII teams
Locations of Super League XXIII teams
Locations of Super League XXIII teams in West Yorkshire

Team	2017 position	Stadium	Capacity	City/Area
Castleford Tigers (2018 season)	1st (League Leaders/Runners-Up)	The Mend-A-Hose Jungle	11,750	Castleford, West Yorkshire
Catalans Dragons (2018 season)	10th	Stade Gilbert Brutus	14,000	Perpignan, Pyrénées-Orientales, France
Huddersfield Giants (2018 season)	8th	John Smith's Stadium	24,544	Huddersfield, West Yorkshire
Hull (2018 season)	3rd	KCOM Stadium	25,404	Kingston upon Hull, East Riding of Yorkshire
Hull Kingston Rovers (2018 season)	Promoted	Lightstream Stadium	12,225	Kingston upon Hull, East Riding of Yorkshire
Leeds Rhinos (2018 season)	2nd (Champions)	Headingley Carnegie Stadium	22,250	Leeds, West Yorkshire
Salford Red Devils (2018 season)	7th	AJ Bell Stadium	12,000	Salford, Greater Manchester
St. Helens (2018 season)	4th	Totally Wicked Stadium	18,000	St. Helens, Merseyside
Wakefield Trinity (2018 season)	5th	Beaumont Legal Stadium	11,000	Wakefield, West Yorkshire
Warrington Wolves (2018 season)	9th	Halliwell Jones Stadium	15,500	Warrington, Cheshire
Widnes Vikings (2018 season)	12th	The Select Security Stadium	13,500	Widnes, Cheshire
Wigan Warriors (2018 season)	6th	DW Stadium	25,138	Wigan, Greater Manchester

== Regular season ==
Pos	Team	Pld	W	D	L	PF	PA	PD	Pts	Qualification
1	St. Helens	23	21	0	2	713	298	+415	42	Super League Super 8s
2	Wigan Warriors	23	16	0	7	573	345	+228	32	Super League Super 8s
3	Castleford Tigers	23	15	1	7	567	480	+87	31	Super League Super 8s
4	Warrington Wolves	23	14	1	8	531	410	+121	29	Super League Super 8s
5	Huddersfield Giants	23	11	1	11	427	629	−202	23	Super League Super 8s
6	Hull F.C.	23	11	0	12	534	544	−10	22	Super League Super 8s
7	Wakefield Trinity	23	10	1	12	581	506	+75	21	Super League Super 8s
8	Catalans Dragons	23	10	1	12	488	531	−43	21	Super League Super 8s
9	Leeds Rhinos	23	8	2	13	441	527	−86	18	The Qualifiers
10	Hull KR	23	8	1	14	476	582	−106	17	The Qualifiers
11	Salford Red Devils	23	7	0	16	384	597	−213	14	The Qualifiers
12	Widnes Vikings	23	3	0	20	387	653	−266	6	The Qualifiers

Source: Rugby League Project

== Super 8s ==
=== Super League ===
Pos	Team	Pld	W	D	L	PF	PA	PD	Pts	Qualification
1	St. Helens (L)	30	26	0	4	895	408	+487	52	Semi-finals
2	Wigan Warriors (C)	30	23	0	7	740	417	+323	46	Semi-finals
3	Castleford Tigers	30	20	1	9	767	582	+185	41	Semi-finals
4	Warrington Wolves	30	18	1	11	767	561	+206	37	Semi-finals
5	Wakefield Trinity	30	13	1	16	747	696	+51	27	
6	Huddersfield Giants	30	13	1	16	539	794	−255	27	
7	Catalans Dragons	30	12	1	17	596	750	−154	25	
8	Hull F.C.	30	11	0	19	615	787	−172	22	

Source: Rugby League Project
(C) Champions; (L) League Leaders' Shield Winners

=== The Qualifiers ===
Pos	Team	Pld	W	D	L	PF	PA	PD	Pts	Qualification
1	Salford Red Devils	7	5	0	2	218	75	+143	10	Super League XXIV
2	Leeds Rhinos	7	5	0	2	216	137	+79	10	Super League XXIV
3	Hull KR	7	5	0	2	197	162	+35	10	Super League XXIV
4	Toronto Wolfpack	7	5	0	2	136	118	+18	10	Million Pound Game
5	London Broncos (P)	7	4	0	3	161	164	−3	8	Million Pound Game
6	Toulouse Olympique	7	3	0	4	156	190	−34	6	2019 Championship
7	Widnes Vikings (R)	7	1	0	6	92	173	−81	2	2019 Championship
8	Halifax	7	0	0	7	68	225	−157	0	2019 Championship

(P) Promoted; (R) Relegated

== Playoffs ==
Home	Score	Away	Match Information
Home	Score	Away	Date and Time (Local)	Venue	Referee	Attendance
Semi-finals
St. Helens	13–18	Warrington Wolves	4 October 2018, 19:45	Totally Wicked Stadium	Robert Hicks	12,031
Wigan Warriors	14–0	Castleford Tigers	5 October 2018, 19:45	DW Stadium	Ben Thaler	13,461

== Grand Final ==
=== Final ===
13 October 2018
6:00 pm BST

Wigan Warriors	12–4	Warrington Wolves
Tries: Manfredi (2), Davies		Tries: Charnley

Old Trafford, Manchester
Attendance: 64,892
Referee: Robert Hicks
Player of the Match: Stefan Ratchford (Warrington)

=== Wigan Warriors ===
Wigan finished 2nd in regular season and seven consecutive wins in the Super 8's saw them secure 2nd place in the table. A 14–0 victory over Castleford Tigers in the semi-final earned Wigan a place in their 10th Grand Final.

This is the first time that a team has won all 7 Super 8's games in a single season, and since this playoff format will be abandoned at the end of the 2018 season, will make this a unique historic feat achieved by Wigan.

=== Warrington Wolves ===
Warrington finished 4th to earn an away trip to League Leaders Shield winners St. Helens in the semi-finals. Warrington won 18-13 with a late try by Tom Lineham. Warrington will be contesting their 4th Grand Final.

=== Match details ===
This match was Shaun Wane's last game as Wigan coach before going to Scotland Rugby Union after 7 seasons as head coach of Wigan.

=== Teams ===
Wigan Warriors	Position	Warrington Wolves
#1 Sam Tomkins	Fullback	#1 Stefan Ratchford
#21 Dominic Manfredi	Wing	#2 Tom Lineham
#4 Oliver Gildart	Centre	#3 Bryson Goodwin
#3 Dan Sarginson	Centre	#19 Toby King
#2 Tom Davies	Wing	#27 Josh Charnley
#6 George Williams	Stand-off	#6 Kevin Brown
#9 Thomas Leuluai	Scrum-half	#7 Tyrone Roberts
#25 Romain Navarette	Prop	#8 Chris Hill
#7 Sam Powell	Hooker	#9 Daryl Clark
#10 Ben Flower	Prop	#10 Mike Cooper
#40 Joe Greenwood	Second-row	#30 Bodene Thompson
#14 John Bateman	Second-row	#12 Jack Hughes
#13 Sean O'Loughlin	Loose forward	#34 Ben Westwood
#20 Morgan Escare	Interchange	#17 Joe Philbin
#19 Ryan Sutton	Interchange	#13 Ben Murdoch-Masila
#12 Liam Farrell	Interchange	#19 George King
#8 Tony Clubb	Interchange	#15 Declan Patton
Shaun Wane	Coach	Steve Price

== Player statistics ==
=== Top 10 try Scorers ===
Rank	Player	Club	Tries
1	(Australia) Ben Barba	St. Helens	28
2	(England) Tom Johnstone	Wakefield Trinity	24
3	(England) Mark Percival	St. Helens	20
4=	(England) Greg Eden	Castleford Tigers	18
4=	(England) Ben Jones-Bishop	Wakefield Trinity	18
4=	(England) Tom Lineham	Warrington Wolves	18
7=	(United States) Bureta Faraimo	Hull F.C.	17
7=	(England) Jonny Lomax	St. Helens	17
9	(England) Liam Marshall	Wigan Warriors	16
10=	(Papua New Guinea) David Mead	Catalans Dragons	15
10=	(Wales) Regan Grace	St. Helens	15
10=	(England) Josh Charnley	Warrington Wolves	15
10=	(England) Stefan Ratchford	Warrington Wolves	15

=== Top 10 try assists ===
Rank	Player	Club	Assists
1	(Australia) Jacob Miller	Wakefield Trinity	28
2	(England) Paul McShane	Castleford Tigers	27
3	(Australia) Ben Barba	St. Helens	24
4	(England) Richie Myler	Leeds Rhinos	23
5=	(Australia) Josh Drinkwater	Catalans Dragons	22
5=	(England) George Williams	Wigan Warriors	22
7	(England) Kevin Brown	Warrington Wolves	20
8=	(England) Ryan Hampshire	Wakefield Trinity	19
8=	(England) Stefan Ratchford	Warrington Wolves	19
10	(England) Sam Tomkins	Wigan Warriors	18

=== Top 10 goal scorers ===
Rank	Player	Club	Goals	Drop Goals
1	(England) Danny Richardson	St. Helens	135	6
2	(England) Sam Tomkins	Wigan Warriors	96	6
3	(Scotland) Danny Brough	Huddersfield Giants	62	2
4	(England) Ryan Hampshire	Wakefield Trinity	61	1
5	(England) Ryan Shaw	Hull KR	56	0
6	(England) Jamie Ellis	Castleford Tigers	54	1
7	(Australia) Josh Drinkwater	Catalans Dragons	53	0
8	(England) Marc Sneyd	Hull F.C.	51	5
9	(England) Luke Gale	Castleford Tigers	48	4
10	(England) Jake Connor	Hull F.C.	40	2

=== Top 10 points scorers ===
Rank	Player	Club	Points
1	(England) Danny Richardson	St. Helens	296
2	(England) Sam Tomkins	Wigan Warriors	241
3	(England) Ryan Shaw	Hull KR	156
4	(England) Ryan Hampshire	Wakefield Trinity	143
5	(Australia) Josh Drinkwater	Catalans Dragons	134
6	(Scotland) Danny Brough	Huddersfield Giants	130
7	(England) Jamie Ellis	Castleford Tigers	117
8	(England) Stefan Ratchford	Warrington Wolves	114
9	(Australia) Ben Barba	St. Helens	112
10	(England) Marc Sneyd	Hull F.C.	111

• Updated to match(es) played on 28 September 2018 (Super 8s – Round 7)

== Discipline ==
Red Cards

Rank	Player	Club	Red Cards
1=	(England) Liam Watts *	Castleford Tigers / Hull F.C.	1
1=	(New Zealand) Kenny Edwards	Catalans Dragons	1
1=	(France) Mickael Simon	Catalans Dragons	1
1=	(Scotland) Danny Brough	Huddersfield Giants	1
1=	(United States) Bureta Faraimo	Hull F.C.	1
1=	(England) Lee Mossop	Salford Red Devils	1
1=	(Wales) Morgan Knowles	St. Helens	1
1=	(England) Matty Lees	St. Helens	1
1=	(Australia) Jacob Miller	Wakefield Trinity	1
1=	(England) Declan Patton	Warrington Wolves	1
1=	(Papua New Guinea) Wellington Albert	Widnes Vikings	1
1=	(Australia) Chris Houston	Widnes Vikings	1

- Liam Watts' red card was picked up whilst playing for Hull F.C.

Yellow Cards

Rank	Player	Club	Yellow Cards
1=	(Tonga) Sam Moa	Catalans Dragons	3
1=	(France) Mickael Simon	Catalans Dragons	3
2=	(England) Adam Milner	Castleford Tigers	2
2=	(France) Julian Bousquet	Catalans Dragons	2
2=	(England) Michael McIlorum	Catalans Dragons	2
2=	(France) Fouad Yaha	Catalans Dragons	2
2=	(Australia) Ryan Hinchcliffe	Huddersfield Giants	2
2=	(Eswatini) Kruise Leeming	Huddersfield Giants	2
2=	(England) Josh Johnson	Hull KR	2
2=	(New Zealand) Lama Tasi	Salford Red Devils	2
2=	(New Zealand) Weller Hauraki *	Salford Red Devils / Widnes Vikings	2
2=	(England) Mark Percival	St. Helens	2
2=	(England) Matty Ashurst	Wakefield Trinity	2
2=	(England) Craig Huby	Wakefield Trinity	2
2=	(Australia) Tyler Randell	Wakefield Trinity	2
2=	(England) Mike Cooper	Warrington Wolves	2
2=	(England) Tom Lineham	Warrington Wolves	2
2=	(Australia) Chris Houston	Widnes Vikings	2
2=	(New Zealand) Thomas Leuluai	Wigan Warriors	2
2=	(England) Sam Tomkins	Wigan Warriors	2
3=	(England) Matt Cook	Castleford Tigers	1
3=	(England) Oliver Holmes	Castleford Tigers	1
3=	(England) Mike McMeeken	Castleford Tigers	1
3=	(Australia) Grant Millington	Castleford Tigers	1
3=	(England) Joe Wardle	Castleford Tigers	1
3=	(France) Lambert Belmas	Catalans Dragons	1
3=	(Australia) Greg Bird	Catalans Dragons	1
3=	(France) Benjamin Jullien	Catalans Dragons	1
3=	(Scotland) Lewis Tierney	Catalans Dragons	1
3=	(Fiji) Brayden Williame	Catalans Dragons	1
3=	(Scotland) Danny Brough	Huddersfield Giants	1
3=	(England) Michael Lawrence	Huddersfield Giants	1
3=	(England) Jermaine McGillvary	Huddersfield Giants	1
3=	(England) Jordan Turner	Huddersfield Giants	1
3=	(England) Jacob Wardle	Huddersfield Giants	1
3=	(England) Jake Connor	Hull F.C.	1
3=	(United States) Bureta Faraimo	Hull F.C.	1
3=	(England) Josh Griffin	Hull F.C.	1
3=	(England) Maurice Blair	Hull KR	1
3=	(England) Chris Clarkson	Hull KR	1
3=	(England) Matthew Marsh	Hull KR	1
3=	(Samoa) Mose Masoe	Hull KR	1
3=	(England) Nick Scruton	Hull KR	1
3=	(England) Danny Tickle	Hull KR	1
3=	(England) Joel Tomkins *	Hull KR / Wigan Warriors	1
3=	(England) Brett Ferres	Leeds Rhinos	1
3=	(Australia) Matt Parcell	Leeds Rhinos	1
3=	(Australia) Brad Singleton	Leeds Rhinos	1
3=	(England) George Griffin	Salford Red Devils	1
3=	(New Zealand) Junior Sa'u	Salford Red Devils	1
3=	(England) Logan Tomkins	Salford Red Devils	1
3=	(England) Kris Welham	Salford Red Devils	1
3=	(England) Ryan Lannon	Salford Red Devils	1
3=	(England) Kyle Amor	St. Helens	1
3=	(Scotland) Luke Douglas	St. Helens	1
3=	(England) Matty Lees	St. Helens	1
3=	(France) Dominique Peyroux	St. Helens	1
3=	(England) Scott Grix	Wakefield Trinity	1
3=	(England) Max Jowitt	Wakefield Trinity	1
3=	(England) Reece Lyne	Wakefield Trinity	1
3=	(Tonga) Sitaleki Akauola	Warrington Wolves	1
3=	(England) Ryan Atkins	Warrington Wolves	1
3=	(England) George King	Warrington Wolves	1
3=	(New Zealand) Hep Cahill	Widnes Vikings	1
3=	(England) Danny Walker	Widnes Vikings	1
3=	(England) Sam Powell	Wigan Warriors	1
3=	(France) Romain Navarette	Wigan Warriors	1

- Weller Hauraki has been sin binned once for Salford, and once for Widnes
- Joel Tomkins' sin bin was picked up whilst playing for Wigan Warriors
- Updated to match(es) played on 22 September 2018 (Super 8s Round 6)

== Attendances ==
Average attendances

Club	Home Games	Total	Average	Highest	Lowest
Castleford Tigers	11	86,888	7,898	9,557	5,946
Catalans Dragons	11	91,891	8,353	10,236	6,585
Huddersfield Giants	11	63,199	5,745	9,121	4,385
Hull FC	11	133,921	12,174	17,564	10,051
Hull KR	11	87,614	7,964	12,090	6,711
Leeds Rhinos	11	140,881	12,807	23,246	10,366
Salford Red Devils	11	30,236	2,748	5,568	2,248
St Helens	11	126,264	11,478	17,980	10,008
Wakefield Trinity	11	57,685	5,244	7,020	4,055
Warrington Wolves	11	110,969	10,088	12,268	8,792
Widnes Vikings	11	53,876	4,897	7,009	3,681
Wigan Warriors	10	117,084	11,708	16,047	10,641

Top 10 attendances

Rank	Home club	Away club	Stadium	Attendance
1	Wigan Warriors	Warrington Wolves	Old Trafford	64,892
2	Magic Weekend: Day 1		St. James' Park	38,881
3	Magic Weekend: Day 2		St. James' Park	25,438
4	Leeds Rhinos	Castleford Tigers	Elland Road	23,246
5	St Helens	Wigan Warriors	Totally Wicked Stadium	17,980
6	Hull FC	Hull KR	KCOM Stadium	17,564
7	Leeds Rhinos	Hull KR	Elland Road	16,149
8	Wigan Warriors	St Helens	DW Stadium	16,047
9	Hull FC	Huddersfield Giants	KCOM Stadium	13,704
10	Hull FC	Castleford Tigers	KCOM Stadium	13,623

- Statistics correct as of 27 July 2018 (Round 23)

== End-of-season awards ==
Awards are presented for outstanding contributions and efforts to players and clubs in the week leading up to the Super League Grand Final:

- Coach of the year: (England) Shaun Wane (Wigan Warriors)
- Foundation of the year: Leeds Rhinos
- Hit Man: (England) Paul McShane (Castleford Tigers) (1160 tackles)
- Man of Steel: (Australia) Ben Barba (St. Helens)
- Metre-maker: (Tonga) Bill Tupou (Wakefield Trinity) (4114 Metres)
- Rhino "Top Gun": (England) Luke Gale (Castleford Tigers)
- Super League Club of The Year: Warrington Wolves
- Top Try Scorer: (Australia) Ben Barba (St. Helens) (28)
- Young player of the year: (England) Jake Trueman (Castleford Tigers)

== Media ==
=== Television ===
2018 is the second of a five-year contract with Sky Sports to televise 100 matches per season.

Sky Sports coverage in the UK will see two live matches broadcast each week, usually at 8:00 pm on Thursday and Friday nights.

Regular commentators will be Eddie Hemmings with summarisers including Phil Clarke, Brian Carney, Barrie McDermott and Terry O'Connor. Sky will broadcast highlights on Sunday nights on Super League - Full Time at 10 p.m.

BBC Sport will broadcast a highlights programme called the Super League Show, presented by Tanya Arnold. The BBC show two weekly broadcasts of the programme, the first to the BBC North West, Yorkshire, North East and Cumbria, and East Yorkshire and Lincolnshire regions on Monday evenings at 11:35 p.m. on BBC One, while a repeat showing is shown nationally on BBC Two on Tuesday afternoons at 1.30 p.m. The Super League Show is also available for one month after broadcast for streaming or download via the BBC iPlayer in the UK only. End of season play-offs are shown on BBC Two across the whole country in a weekly highlights package on Sunday afternoons.

Internationally, Super League is shown live or delayed on Showtime Sports (Middle East), Sky Sport (New Zealand), TV 2 Sport (Norway), Fox Soccer Plus (United States), Fox Sports (Australia) and Sportsnet World (Canada).

=== Radio ===
BBC Coverage:

- BBC Radio 5 Live Sports Extra (National DAB Digital Radio) will carry two Super League commentaries each week on Thursday and Friday nights (both kick off 8pm); this will be through the 5 Live Rugby league programme which is presented by Dave Woods with a guest summariser (usually a Super League player or coach) and also includes interviews and debate..
- BBC Radio Humberside will have full match commentary of all Hull F.C. matches.
- BBC Radio Leeds carry commentaries featuring Leeds, Castleford, Wakefield and Huddersfield.
- BBC Radio Manchester will carry commentary of Leigh, Wigan and Salford whilst sharing commentary of Warrington with BBC Radio Merseyside.
- BBC Radio Merseyside will have commentary on St Helens and Widnes matches whilst sharing commentary of Warrington with BBC Radio Manchester.

Commercial Radio Coverage:

- 102.4 Wish FM will carry commentaries of Wigan & St Helens matches.
- 107.2 Wire FM will carry commentaries on Warrington Home and Away.
- Radio Yorkshire will launch in March carrying Super League commentaries.
- Radio Warrington (Online Station) all Warrington home games and some away games.
- Grand Sud FM covers every Catalans Dragons Home Match (in French).
- Radio France Bleu Roussillon covers every Catalans Dragons Away Match (in French).

All Super League commentaries on any station are available via the particular stations on-line streaming.
