= 2017 RFL Championship =

- League: Championship
- Duration: 23 rounds (followed by a league split into "Super 8's" for 7 more fixtures)
- Teams: 12
- Broadcast partners: Sky Sports

2017 season
- Championship Winners: Hull Kingston Rovers
- Championship Shield: Toulouse Olympique

Promotion and relegation
- Promoted from RFL Championship: Hull Kingston Rovers
- Relegated to League 1: Bradford Bulls; Oldham

The 2017 Rugby Football League Championship, known as Kingstone Press Championship due to sponsorship by Kingstone Press Cider, is a rugby league football competition predominantly played in the UK, one tier below the first tier Super League. The 2017 season was the third to consist of a new structure combining the championship and super league divisions three quarters of the way through the season.

The 2017 Championship featured 12 teams, which all played one another twice in the regular season, once at home, and once away, totalling 22 games. The 2017 season also featured the "Summer Bash Weekend" for a third time. This is a 23rd round of fixtures which replicates Super League's Magic Weekend concept for the Championship sides. After these 23 rounds in both the Championship and the Super League, the two divisions of twelve were split into three divisions of eight, the "Super 8's".

Following the split into the Super 8's, the top four teams in the Championship 2017 joined the bottom four teams of the Super League 2017 in the qualifiers. This group saw each team play each other once each, totalling seven extra games, with points reset to zero for the qualifiers. After seven extra rounds, the top three teams earned a place in the Super League competition for 2018, thus either retaining or earning a place in the top competition. The teams finishing 4th and 5th in the qualifiers played off in an extra fixture, hosted by the fourth-place side, for the final place in the 2018 Super League competition. The loser of this fixture, along with teams finishing 6th, 7th, and 8th in the qualifiers, were either relegated to or remained in the Championship for the 2018 season.

Teams finishing after 23 rounds between 5th and 12th in the Championship played in the third of the three "Super 8" groups, "The Championship Shield". This saw each team playing each other once more, but with points from the original season retained. Following the additional seven rounds a four-team play-off took place pitting 1st vs 4th and 2nd vs 3rd, with the winners playing each other in the final to win the "Championship Shield". The two teams finishing at the bottom of this group of eight were relegated to the 2018 Kingstone Press League One, being replaced by two promoted teams from the 2017 League 1 competition.

Relegation to League 1 was in place for the 2017 season, with the two bottom teams from "The Championship Shield" group after the split suffering the drop, with promotion to the Super League being available to teams finishing in the top four after 23 rounds. All of the teams in the 2017 Championship also competed in the 2017 Challenge Cup, where they entered in the third round.

== Teams ==
This year's competition featured 12 teams. The teams consisted of nine of the 12 teams from 2016, the champions of the 2016 League 1 season, Rochdale Hornets, and the champion of the Championship 1 playoffs, Toulouse Olympique. Whitehaven and Workington Town, who finished in the bottom two in 2016, were relegated to League One for 2017. In addition to this Hull Kingston Rovers were relegated to the Championship following their loss in the 2017 £1 million match, whilst 2016 Championship winners Leigh Centurions were promoted into Super League for 2017.

The Bradford Bulls went into liquidation in January 2017 but a reformed team were allowed to continue in the Championship with a 12-point penalty.

Legend
Championship Shield holders
Promoted from League 1
Relegated from Super League

Locations of the 2017 RFL Championship teams
Locations of 2019 RFL Championship teams
Locations of the 2017 RFL Championship teams in West Yorkshire
Locations of the 2017 RFL Championship teams in Greater Manchester

Team and current season	Stadium	Capacity	Location
Batley Bulldogs	Fox's Biscuits Stadium	7,500	Batley, West Yorkshire
Bradford Bulls	Provident Stadium	27,500	Bradford, West Yorkshire
Dewsbury Rams	Tetley's Stadium	5,800	Dewsbury, West Yorkshire
Featherstone Rovers	Bigfellas Stadium	8,000	Featherstone, West Yorkshire
Halifax	The MBi Shay	14,000	Halifax, West Yorkshire
Hull Kingston Rovers	Lightstream Stadium	12,225	Hull, East Yorkshire
London Broncos	Trailfinders Sports Ground	3,020	Ealing, London
Oldham	Bower Fold	6,500	Stalybridge, Greater Manchester
Rochdale Hornets	Spotland Stadium	10,249	Rochdale, Greater Manchester
Sheffield Eagles	Belle Vue	11,000	Wakefield, West Yorkshire
Swinton Lions	Heywood Road	3,387	Sale, Greater Manchester
Toulouse Olympique	Stade Ernest-Argelès	4,000	Toulouse, France

== Final standings ==
Pos	Team	Pld	W	D	L	PF	PA	PD	Pts	Qualification
1	Hull Kingston Rovers (X)	23	19	1	3	850	385	+465	39	The Qualifiers
2	London Broncos	23	18	0	5	832	410	+422	36	The Qualifiers
3	Halifax	23	16	0	7	567	357	+210	32	The Qualifiers
4	Featherstone Rovers	23	15	1	7	687	421	+266	31	The Qualifiers
5	Toulouse Olympique	23	15	0	8	720	466	+254	30	Championship Shield
6	Batley Bulldogs	23	11	0	12	549	663	−114	22	Championship Shield
7	Sheffield Eagles	23	10	0	13	568	785	−217	20	Championship Shield
8	Dewsbury Rams	23	8	0	15	388	736	−348	16	Championship Shield
9	Rochdale Hornets	23	7	1	15	457	680	−223	15	Championship Shield
10	Swinton Lions	23	6	0	17	477	648	−171	12	Championship Shield
11	Oldham	23	5	1	17	410	735	−325	11	Championship Shield
12	Bradford Bulls (Note: Bradford Bulls deducted 12 points on 3 January 2017 for entering administration.)	23	6	0	17	500	719	−219	0	Championship Shield

(X) League Leaders Shield
