= Super League Super 8s =

- Current season or competition: 2018 Super 8s
- Sport: Rugby league
- Instituted: 2015
- Number of teams: 8
- Country: England; France (RFL)
- Broadcast partner: Sky Sports; BBC Sport (Highlights)

The Super League Super 8s are the second stage of the Super League season as part of the Super 8s. Super League is officially known as Super League Europe and it is the top-level of the British rugby league system.

== Format ==
After 23 rounds in the regular season, the top 8 clubs carry points they have earned forward and play each other once more home or away depending on league positioning. After 7 more games the top four teams enter the playoffs.

== Results ==
Year	League Leaders	Participants
2015	Leeds Rhinos	Wigan Warriors; Huddersfield Giants; St. Helens; Castleford Tigers; Warrington Wolves; Catalans Dragons; Hull F.C.
2016	Warrington Wolves	Wigan Warriors; Hull F.C. St. Helens; Catalans Dragons; Castleford Tigers; Widnes Vikings; Wakefield Trinity
2017	Castleford Tigers	Leeds Rhinos; Hull F.C. St. Helens; Wakefield Trinity; Wigan Warriors; Salford Red Devils; Huddersfield Giants
2018	St. Helens	Wigan Warriors; Castleford Tigers; Warrington Wolves; Wakefield Trinity; Huddersfield Giants; Catalans Dragons; Hull F.C.

== Super 8 Appearances ==
	Name	Apps	Years
1	St. Helens	4	2015, 2016, 2017, 2018
2	Castleford	4	2015, 2016, 2017, 2018
3	Wigan	4	2015, **2016**, 2017, **2018**
4	Hull	4	2015. 2016, 2017, 2018
5	Warrington	3	2015, 2016, 2018
6	Catalans Dragons	3	2015, 2016, 2018
7	Huddersfield	3	2015, 2017, 2018
8	Wakefield	3	2016, 2017, 2018
9	Leeds	2	**2015**, **2017**
10	Widnes	1	2016
11	Salford	1	2017

Bold- Won the Grand Final

Italic- Won League Leaders Shield

Bold & Italic - Won Grand Final & League Leaders Shield
