= 2019 Super League season =

European rugby league competition

Super League XXIV
- League: Super League
- Duration: 29 rounds
- Teams: 12
- Highest attendance: 31,555; Catalans Dragons Vs Wigan Warriors (18 May)
- Lowest attendance: 1,133; London Broncos vs Salford Red Devils (27 April)
- Average attendance: 8,441
- Attendance: 1,468,823; as of 20 September 2019 (playoffs game 2)
- Broadcast partners: Sky Sports; BBC Sport; Fox League beIN Sports; Fox Soccer Plus; Sport Klub

2019 season
- Champions: St. Helens; 7th Super League title 14th British title
- League Leaders Shield: St. Helens
- Runners-up: Salford Red Devils
- Biggest home win: St. Helens 62–16 Hull FC (22 April)
- Biggest away win: Hull F.C. 12–63 Warrington Wolves (29 March 2019)
- Man of Steel: (Australia) Jackson Hastings
- Top point-scorer: (Scotland) Lachlan Coote (247)
- Top try-scorer: (England) Tommy Makinson (23)

Promotion and relegation
- Promoted from Championship: Toronto Wolfpack
- Relegated to Championship: London Broncos

Super League XXIV, known as the Betfred Super League XXIV for sponsorship reasons, was the 2019 iteration of and the 24th season of the Super League and 125th season of rugby league in Great Britain.

Twelve teams competed over 29 rounds, including the Magic Weekend, which took place at Anfield. After the regular rounds, the top five highest teams entered the Super League play-offs, for a place in the Super League Grand Final.

London Broncos were immediately relegated to the Championship after only being promoted last year, but a bad season saw them win just 10 games out of 29. They will be replaced by Toronto Wolfpack.

Wigan Warriors were the defending champions, but they were eliminated from the competition, after suffering back to back defeats in the semi-finals. First against St Helens in the semi final, and eventually losing out to Salford in the preliminary final.

Toronto Wolfpack won the Million Pound Game by beating Featherstone Rovers 24–6 and were promoted to the Super League, for the first time in the club's history.

St. Helens were crowned champions on 12 October, after a 23–6 victory over Salford, which saw them claim their first championship in 5 years.

== Format ==
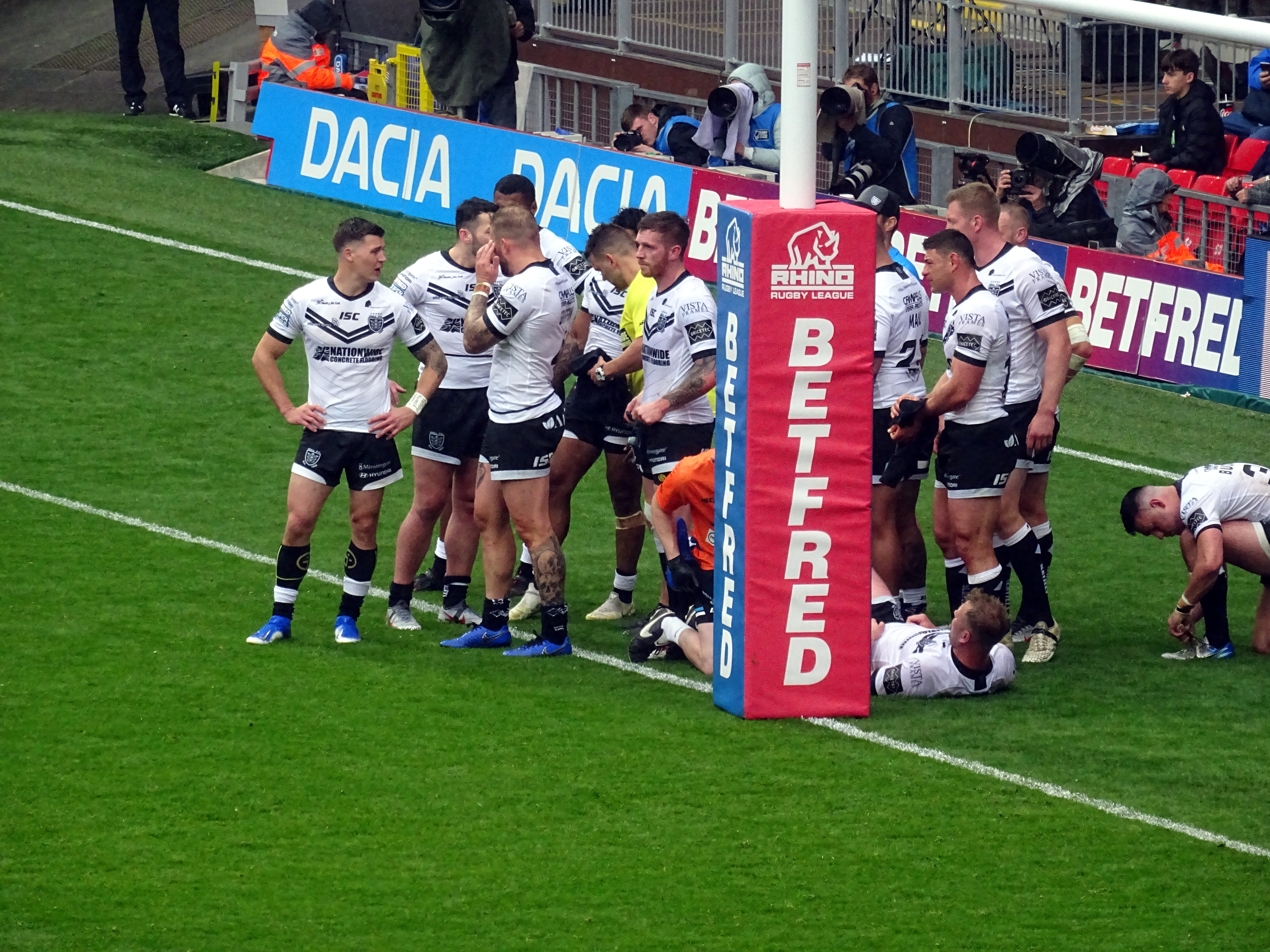
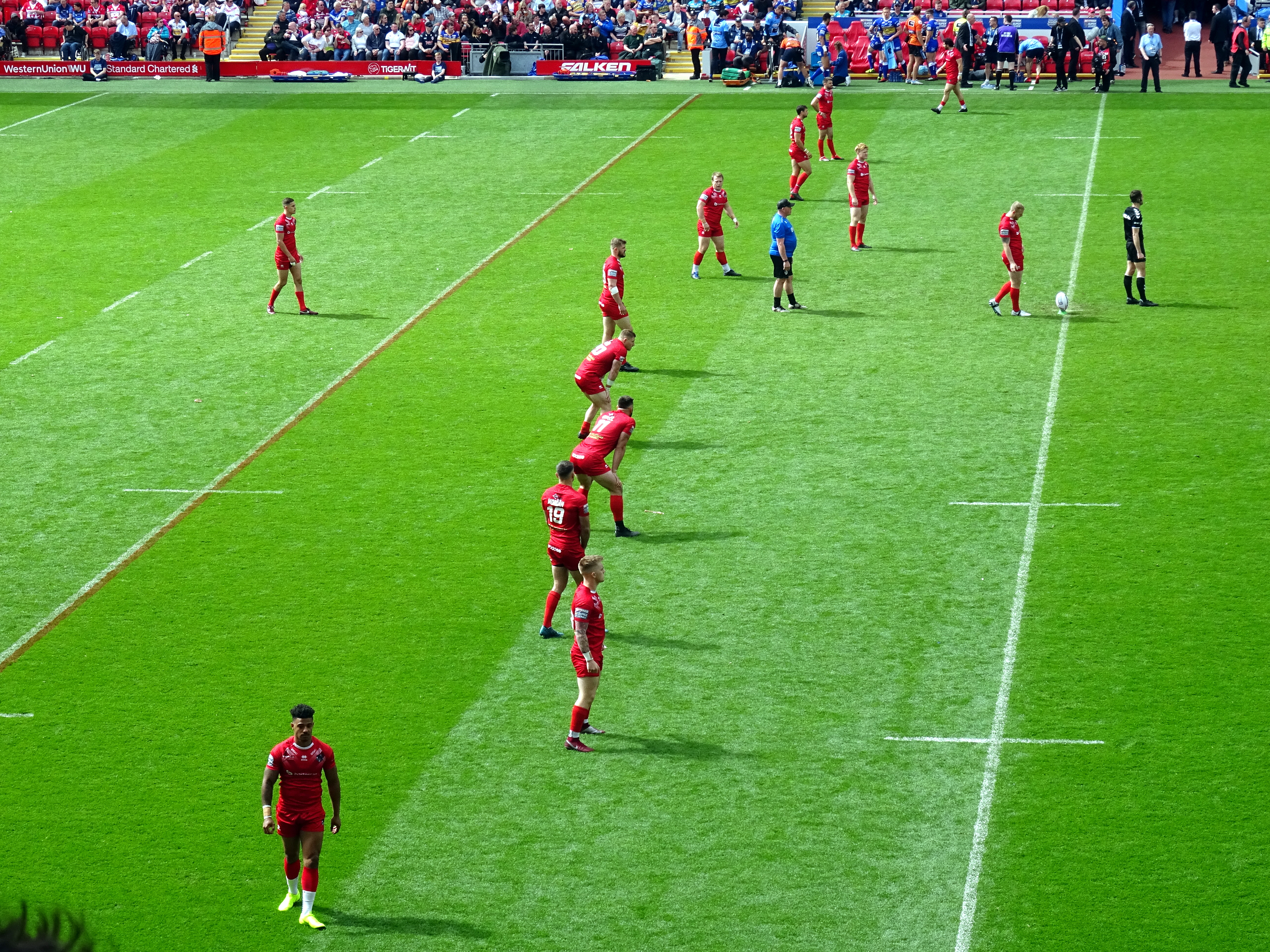
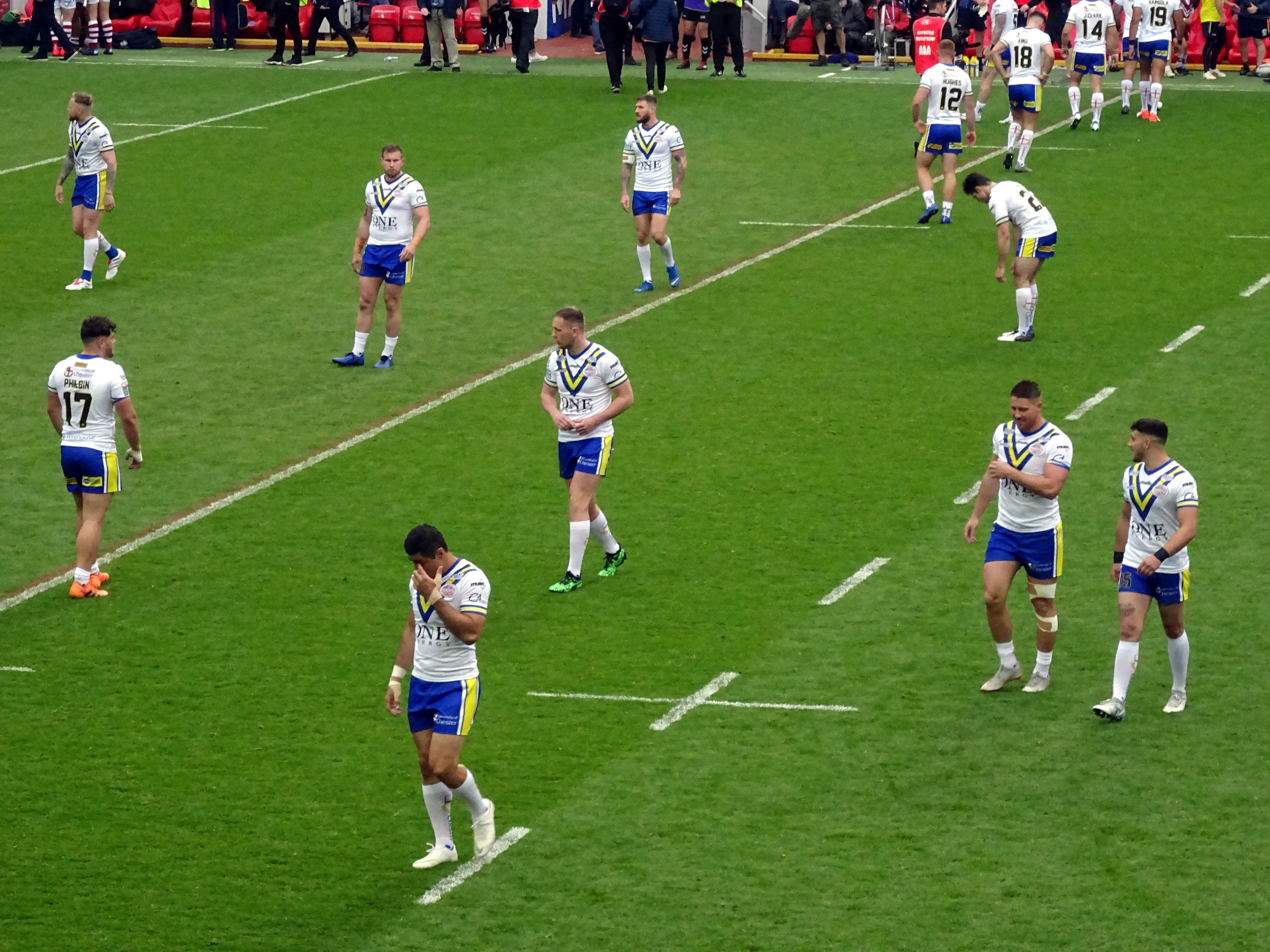
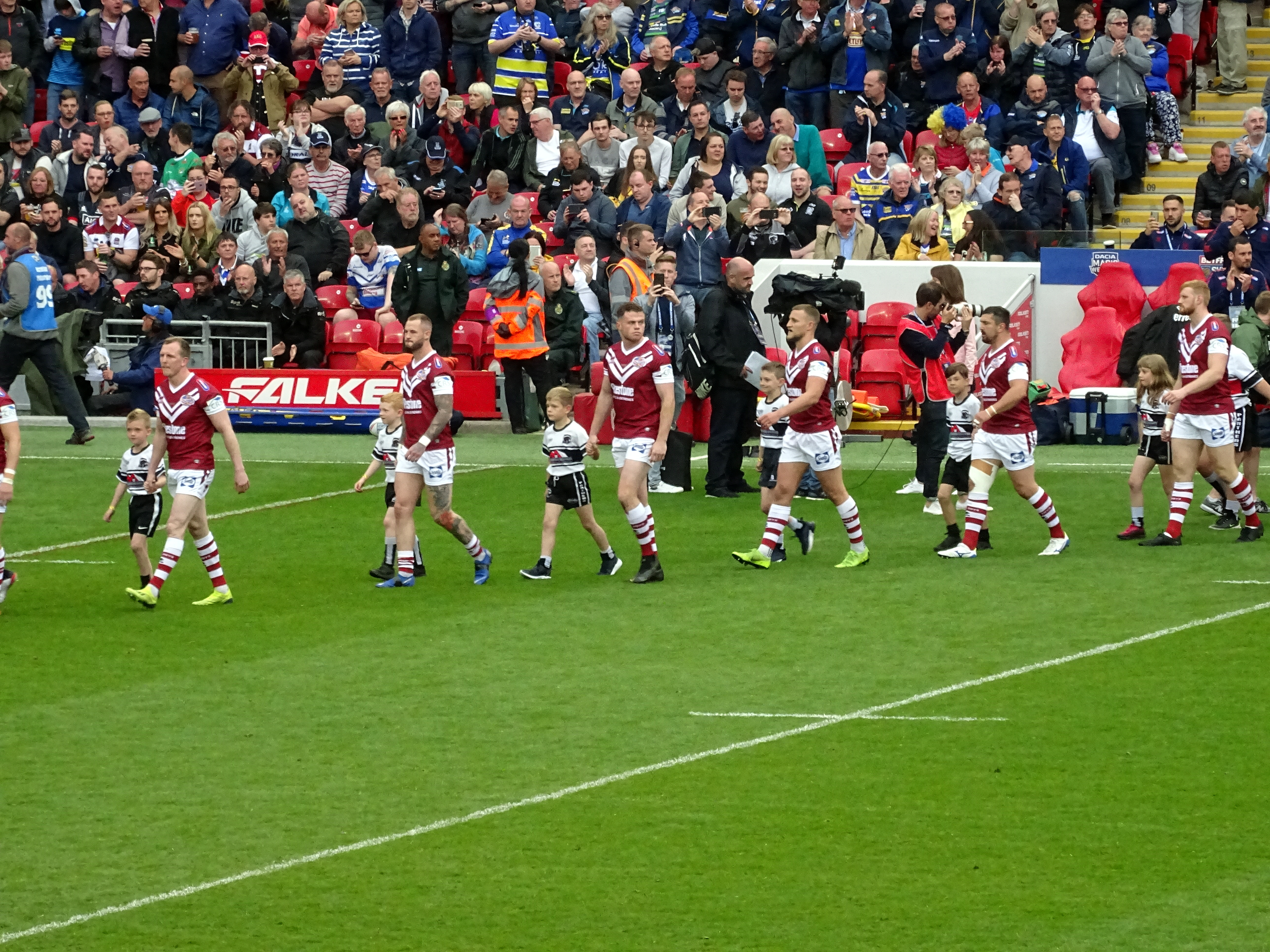
Magic Weekend, at Anfield, 2019

Following a vote of RFL clubs in 2018, Super League has implemented a number of changes to the format for Super League XXIV. The Qualifiers were scrapped and the play-offs for the Super League Grand Final changed from a top four to top five play-offs system for the first time in 18 years as it was last used in 2001. For relegation, the Rugby League Super 8s were also scrapped so that the team that finishes bottom of the Super League will be relegated and replaced by the winner of the Championship Grand Final. The Magic Weekend was held on 25 and 26 May at Anfield in Liverpool. Each team will play each other home and away, with an extra game at the Magic Weekend, before a series of 6 "loop" fixtures are played to finish the regular season.

The Super League game between Catalans Dragons and Wigan Warriors, saw a new record crowd of 31,555 fans, and it was the first game to be played at Barcelona's Camp Nou stadium on 18 May 2019.

Catalan went on to win the match, 33–16, thus ending a 10-game losing streak against Wigan, and their first win over Wigan since 2015.

For the first time in Super League history, the Derby between St Helens and Wigan was not televised, as Sky Sports opted to televise the relegation battle between Leeds and Hull KR.

St Helens won the League Leaders Shield for the second season running on 3 August when Warrington Wolves were beaten 30-10 by Catalans Dragons, thus ensuring that 2nd placed Warrington, 12 points behind with 5 games left, could no longer catch the Saints.

== Teams ==
Super League XXIV featured twelve teams. This is also the fourth year since promotion and relegation was reintroduced into the competition. London Broncos were promoted from the Championship after defeating Toronto Wolfpack in the final Million Pound Game to compete in Super League for the first time since 2014. They also received special dispensation from the RFL to play their home Super League matches at their Trailfinders Sports Ground, which they share with rugby union's Ealing Trailfinders, even though it is smaller than the RFL's minimum seating requirements. London replaced Widnes Vikings who were relegated last season.

Just prior to the start of the season Wigan Warriors were fined and deducted two competition points for breaching the salary cap in 2017; however, on 6 March following an appeal, the points deduction was suspended, and Wigan were reinstated the 2 points, as long as the club do not breach the salary cap in the following 12 months.

Locations of Super League XXIV teams
Locations of Super League XXIV teams

Twelve teams were selected to play in the inaugural Super League season.

Legend
Reigning Champions
Previous season League Leaders
Promoted

Team	2018 position	Stadium	Capacity	City/Area
Castleford Tigers (2019 season)	3rd	The Mend-A-Hose Jungle	11,750	Castleford, West Yorkshire
Catalans Dragons (2019 season)	7th	Stade Gilbert Brutus	14,000	Perpignan, Pyrénées-Orientales, France
Huddersfield Giants (2019 season)	6th	John Smith's Stadium	24,544	Huddersfield, West Yorkshire
Hull (2019 season)	8th	KCOM Stadium	25,404	Kingston upon Hull, East Riding of Yorkshire
Hull Kingston Rovers (2019 season)	10th	Lightstream Stadium	12,225	Kingston upon Hull, East Riding of Yorkshire
Leeds Rhinos (2019 season)	9th	Headingley Carnegie Stadium	22,250	Leeds, West Yorkshire
London Broncos (2019 season)	2nd in Championship (Promoted)	Trailfinders Sports Ground	4,000	Ealing, London
Salford Red Devils (2019 season)	11th	AJ Bell Stadium	12,000	Salford, Greater Manchester
St. Helens (2019 season)	1st (League leaders)	Totally Wicked Stadium	18,000	St. Helens, Merseyside
Wakefield Trinity (2019 season)	5th	Beaumont Legal Stadium	11,000	Wakefield, West Yorkshire
Warrington Wolves (2019 season)	4th (Runners Up)	Halliwell Jones Stadium	15,500	Warrington, Cheshire
Wigan Warriors (2019 season)	2nd (Champions)	DW Stadium	25,138	Wigan, Greater Manchester

== Results ==
=== Golden Point Extra Time ===
Golden-point extra-time, shot clocks and a reduced number of interchanges are among the law changes confirmed by Super League for the 2019 season.

On 19 November 2018, it was confirmed that Super League would be adopting golden point during regular season for the first time as of the start of the 2019 season, bringing it in line with the NRL which has been using the system since 2003.

The 12 clubs announced the introduction of golden-point extra-time in November, with games level at full-time, to be decided in two additional five-minute periods. If it remains level after the extra 10 minutes, the match will end as a draw.

=== Game 1 (Wigan v Hull FC) ===
The first game to go to golden-point, was the round 3 game between Wigan and Hull F.C. on 24 February 2019. Hull won 23–22, after the scores were tied at 22-all after 80 minutes.

=== Game 2 (Leeds v Castleford) ===
The second game to go to golden-point, was the round 8 game between Leeds and Castleford, on 28 March 2019. Leeds won the match 21–20, after a 40m field goal from Brad Dwyer after the scores were tied at 20-all after 80 minutes.

=== Game 3 (Catalans v Hull FC) ===
The third game to go to golden-point, was the round 10 game between Catalans and Hull FC, on 12 April 2019. Hull won the match 31–30, thanks to a Marc Sneyd field goal, after the scores were tied at 30-all after 80 minutes. This is Hull's 2nd golden point victory so far this season, Sneyd has scored the decisive field goal in both.

=== Game 4 (Castleford v Huddersfield) ===
The fourth game to go to golden-point, was the round 17 game between Castleford and Huddersfield Giants on 7 June 2019. Castleford won the match 27–26, thanks to a Peter Matautia field goal, after the scores were tied at 26-all after 80 minutes.

=== Game 5 (London v St Helens) ===
The fifth game to go to golden-point, was the round 17 game between London Broncos and St Helens on 9 June 2019. London won the match 23–22, thanks to a Morgan Smith field goal, after the scores were tied at 22-all after 80 minutes.

=== Game 6 (Hull KR v Castleford) ===
The sixth game to go to golden-point, was the round 24 game between Hull KR and Castleford on 4 August 2019. Hull KR won the match 27–26, thanks to a Danny McGuire field goal, after the scores were tied at 26-all after 80 minutes.

This was the 3rd time that Castleford had forced extra time, winning just once

=== Game 7 (Salford v Hull KR) ===
The seventh game to go to golden-point, was the round 29 game between Salford and Hull KR on 13 September 2019. Salford won 17–16, after the scores were tied at 16-all after 80 minutes.

== Table ==
Pos	Team	Pld	W	D	L	PF	PA	PD	Pts	Qualification
1	St. Helens (C, L)	29	26	0	3	916	395	+521	52	Semi Final
2	Wigan Warriors	29	18	0	11	699	539	+160	36	Qualifying Final
3	Salford Red Devils	29	17	0	12	783	597	+186	34	Qualifying Final
4	Warrington Wolves	29	16	0	13	709	533	+176	32	Elimination Final
5	Castleford Tigers	29	15	0	14	646	558	+88	30	Elimination Final
6	Hull F.C.	29	15	0	14	645	768	−123	30	
7	Catalans Dragons	29	13	0	16	553	745	−192	26	
8	Leeds Rhinos	29	12	0	17	650	644	+6	24	
9	Wakefield Trinity	29	11	0	18	608	723	−115	22	
10	Huddersfield Giants	29	11	0	18	571	776	−205	22	
11	Hull KR	29	10	0	19	548	768	−220	20	
12	London Broncos (R)	29	10	0	19	505	787	−282	20	Relegated to Championship

(C) Champions; (L) League Leaders' Shield Winners; (R) Relegated

== Playoffs ==
The play-off system in use for 2019 was also previously used between 1998 and 2001.

Qualifying play-off DW Stadium
2	Wigan Warriors	18
3	Salford Red Devils	12
4	Warrington Wolves	12
5	Castleford Tigers	14

Qualifying semi-final Totally Wicked Stadium
1	St. Helens	40
Wigan Warriors	10
Elimination semi-final AJ Bell Stadium
Salford Red Devils	22
Castleford Tigers	0

Preliminary final
Wigan Warriors	4
Salford Red Devils	28

Grand Final; Old Trafford
St. Helens	23
Salford Red Devils	6

=== Week 1: Elimination and qualifying finals ===
Home	Score	Away	Match Information
Home	Score	Away	Date and Time	Venue	Referee	Attendance
Elimination final
Warrington Wolves	12–14	Castleford Tigers	19 September 2019, 19:45	Halliwell Jones Stadium	Chris Kendall	5,627
Qualifying final
Wigan Warriors	18–12	Salford Red Devils	20 September 2019, 19:45	DW Stadium	Robert Hicks	9,247
Progress to semi-final 2: Castleford, Salford; Progress to semi-final 1: Wigan; Eliminated: Warrington

=== Week 2: Semi-finals ===
Home	Score	Away	Match Information
Home	Score	Away	Date and Time	Venue	Referee	Attendance
Semi-final 1
Salford	22–0	Castleford	26 September 2019, 19:45	AJ Bell Stadium	Ben Thaler	6,000
Semi-final 2
St. Helens	40–10	Wigan	27 September 2019, 19:45	Totally Wicked Stadium	Chris Kendall	14,508
Progress to Preliminary Final: Salford Red Devils, Wigan Warriors; Progress to Grand Final: St Helens; Eliminated: Castleford

=== Week 3: Preliminary final ===
Home	Score	Away	Match Information
Home	Score	Away	Date and Time	Venue	Referee	Attendance
Wigan	4–28	Salford	4 October 2019, 19:45	DW Stadium	Ben Thaler	9,858
Progress to Grand Final: Salford; Eliminated: Wigan

=== Week 4: Grand final ===
Home	Score	Away	Match Information
Home	Score	Away	Date and Time	Venue	Referee	Attendance
St Helens	23 – 6	Salford	12 October 2019, 18:00	Old Trafford, Manchester	Chris Kendall	64,102

== Player statistics ==
=== Top 10 try scorers ===
Rank	Player	Club	Tries
1	(England) Tommy Makinson	St. Helens	23
2=	(England) Ash Handley	Leeds Rhinos	22
2=	(England) Niall Evalds	Salford Red Devils	22
4	(Wales) Regan Grace	St. Helens	20
5=	(Fiji) Kevin Naiqama	St. Helens	18
5=	(Australia) Blake Austin	Warrington Wolves	18
7=	(England) Jermaine McGillvary	Huddersfield Giants	17
7=	(England) Jonny Lomax	St. Helens	17
7=	(England) Josh Charnley	Warrington Wolves	17
10	(England) Liam Marshall	Wigan Warriors	16

=== Top 10 try assists ===
Rank	Player	Club	Assists
1	(Australia) Jackson Hastings	Salford Red Devils	36
2=	(Scotland) Lachlan Coote	St. Helens	22
2=	(France) Theo Fages	St. Helens	22
4=	(England) Marc Sneyd	Hull F.C.	21
4=	(England) Jonny Lomax	St. Helens	21
4=	(England) George Williams	Wigan Warriors	21
7=	(England) Paul McShane	Castleford Tigers	19
7=	(England) Daryl Clark	Warrington Wolves	19
9=	(England) Sam Tomkins	Catalans Dragons	18
9=	(England) Lee Gaskell	Huddersfield Giants	18
9=	(Australia) Josh Drinkwater	Hull KR	18

=== Top 10 goal scorers ===
Rank	Player	Club	Goals	Drop Goals
1	(England) Marc Sneyd	Hull F.C.	104	7
2	(Scotland) Lachlan Coote	St. Helens	101	1
3	(England) Zak Hardaker	Wigan Warriors	93	1
4=	(New Zealand) Krisnan Inu	Salford Red Devils	84	1
4=	(England) Stefan Ratchford	Warrington Wolves	84	0
6	(England) Sam Tomkins	Catalans Dragons	76	1
7	(England) Kieran Dixon	London Broncos	75	0
8	(Scotland) Danny Brough	Wakefield Trinity	72	5
9	(England) Ryan Shaw	Hull KR	63	0
10	(Samoa) Peter Matautia	Castleford Tigers	54	1

=== Top 10 points scorers ===
Rank	Player	Club	Points
1	(Scotland) Lachlan Coote	St. Helens	259
2	(England) Zak Hardaker	Wigan Warriors	231
3	(England) Marc Sneyd	Hull F.C.	223
4	(New Zealand) Krisnan Inu	Salford Red Devils	197
5	(England) Kieran Dixon	London Broncos	190
6	(England) Sam Tomkins	Catalans Dragons	189
7	(England) Stefan Ratchford	Warrington Wolves	184
8	(Scotland) Danny Brough	Wakefield Trinity	157
9	(England) Ryan Shaw	Hull KR	142
10	(Samoa) Peter Mata'utia	Castleford Tigers	119

Statistics correct, as of 20 September 2019 (Play off game 2)

== Discipline ==
Red Cards

Rank	Player	Club	Red Cards
1=	(Samoa) Jesse Sene-Lefao	Castleford Tigers	1
1=	(England) Michael McIlorum	Catalans Dragons	1
1=	(England) Sam Tomkins	Catalans Dragons	1
1=	(England) Josh Griffin	Hull F.C.	1
1=	(Republic of Ireland) Brad Singleton	Leeds Rhinos	1
1=	(England) Ben Westwood	Warrington Wolves	1

Yellow Cards

Rank	Player	Club	Yellow Cards
1=	(England) Jake Connor	Hull F.C.	3
1=	(Australia) Pauli Pauli (Note: Pauli Pauli has been sin binned once for Salford, and twice for Wakefield)	Salford Red Devils / Wakefield Trinity	3
2=	(Tonga) Ukuma Ta'ai	Huddersfield Giants	2
2=	(Australia) Albert Kelly	Hull F.C.	2
2=	(England) Danny McGuire	Hull KR	2
2=	(France) Éloi Pélissier	London Broncos	2
2=	(Scotland) Danny Brough	Wakefield Trinity	2
2=	(England) Jack Hughes	Warrington Wolves	2
2=	(Australia) Jake Mamo	Warrington Wolves	2
2=	(Australia) Willie Isa	Wigan Warriors	2
2=	(France) Romain Navarette	Wigan Warriors	2
11=	(England) Paul McShane	Castleford Tigers	1
11=	(Australia) Grant Millington	Castleford Tigers	1
11=	(England) Adam Milner	Castleford Tigers	1
11=	(France) Jason Baitieri	Catalans Dragons	1
11=	(Australia) Greg Bird	Catalans Dragons	1
11=	(New Zealand) Kenny Edwards	Catalans Dragons	1
11=	(England) Michael McIlorum	Catalans Dragons	1
11=	(Papua New Guinea) David Mead	Catalans Dragons	1
11=	(Tonga) Sam Moa	Catalans Dragons	1
11=	(Fiji) Brayden Wiliame	Catalans Dragons	1
11=	(England) Aaron Murphy	Huddersfield Giants	1
11=	(England) Adam Walne	Huddersfield Giants	1
11=	(England) Oliver Wilson	Huddersfield Giants	1
11=	(England) Gareth Ellis	Hull F.C.	1
11=	(England) Chris Green	Hull F.C.	1
11=	(England) Jack Logan	Hull F.C.	1
11=	(England) Jamie Shaul	Hull F.C.	1
11=	(England) Marc Sneyd	Hull F.C.	1
11=	(England) Scott Taylor	Hull F.C.	1
11=	(England) Ben Crooks	Hull KR	1
11=	(England) James Greenwood	Hull KR	1
11=	(New Zealand) Weller Hauraki	Hull KR	1
11=	(England) Danny McGuire	Hull KR	1
11=	(England) Tom Briscoe	Leeds Rhinos	1
11=	(England) James Donaldson	Leeds Rhinos	1
11=	(England) Brett Ferres	Leeds Rhinos	1
11=	(Australia) Konrad Hurrell	Leeds Rhinos	1
11=	(Australia) Trent Merrin	Leeds Rhinos	1
11=	(New Zealand) Nathaniel Peteru	Leeds Rhinos	1
11=	(England) Kallum Watkins	Leeds Rhinos	1
11=	(England) Kieran Dixon	London Broncos	1
11=	(Wales) Elliot Kear	London Broncos	1
11=	(Albania) Olsi Krasniqi	London Broncos	1
11=	(Wales) Gil Dudson	Salford Red Devils	1
11=	(England) Lee Mossop	Salford Red Devils	1
11=	(Turkey) Jansin Turgut	Salford Red Devils	1
11=	(England) Kris Welham	Salford Red Devils	1
11=	(England) Adam Walker	Salford Red Devils	1
11=	(England) Louie McCarthy-Scarsbrook	St. Helens	1
11=	(England) James Roby	St. Helens	1
11=	(New Zealand) Joseph Paulo	St. Helens	1
11=	(France) Dominique Peyroux	St. Helens	1
11=	(Cook Islands) Tinirau Arona	Wakefield Trinity	1
11=	(Scotland) Ryan Hampshire	Wakefield Trinity	1
11=	(England) Keegan Hirst	Wakefield Trinity	1
11=	(England) Danny Kirmond	Wakefield Trinity	1
11=	(Tonga) Sitaleki Akauola	Warrington Wolves	1
11=	(Australia) Blake Austin	Warrington Wolves	1
11=	(England) Daryl Clark	Warrington Wolves	1
11=	(England) Mike Cooper	Warrington Wolves	1
11=	(New Zealand) Bryson Goodwin	Warrington Wolves	1
11=	(England) Chris Hill	Warrington Wolves	1
11=	(England) Toby King	Warrington Wolves	1
11=	(Australia) Ben Murdoch-Masila	Warrington Wolves	1
11=	(England) Declan Patton	Warrington Wolves	1
11=	(England) Liam Farrell	Wigan Warriors	1
11=	(England) Oliver Gildart	Wigan Warriors	1
11=	(Australia) Dan Sarginson	Wigan Warriors	1

Statistics correct as of 20 September 2019 (playoffs game 2)

== Man of Steel contenders ==
(The 5 nominations for the man of steel awards were as follows)

Player	Club
(England) Liam Watts	Castleford Tigers
(Australia) Jackson Hastings	Salford Red Devils
(Scotland) Lachlan Coote	St. Helens
(Australia) Blake Austin	Warrington Wolves
(England) George Williams	Wigan Warriors

Awards are presented for outstanding contributions and efforts to players and clubs in the week leading up to the Super League Grand Final

The format for choosing the winner of the Steve Prescott Man of Steel award would also change Prior to this season. It was voted on by Super League players, but from this season onwards, it will adopt a similar system to the NRL equivalent the Dally M Medal. A 21-man panel of former players chose the three best players from each weekly round game. 6 points were split between 3 players, with 1st place getting 3 points, 2nd getting 2 points, and 3rd getting 1 point. The leaderboard was public until week 22 in mid-July, when it was then hidden until the Steve Prescott Man of Steel Awards ceremony in October.

Salford's Jackson Hastings was eventually crowned Man of Steel on 6 October 2019.

== End-of-season awards ==
- Coach of the year: (Australia) Justin Holbrook
- Foundation of the year: Warrington Wolves
- Hit Man: (England) Danny Houghton (1259 tackles)
- Man of Steel: (Australia) Jackson Hastings
- Metre-maker: (England) Tommy Makinson (3,803 metres)
- Fans' Entertainer: Jackson Hastings (Salford Red Devils)
- Spirit of Super League Award: Jamie Jones-Buchanan (Leeds Rhinos)
- Top Try Scorer: (England) Tommy Makinson (23)
- Young player of the year: (England) Matty Lees

== Attendances ==
Average attendances

Club	Home Games	Total	Average	Highest	Lowest
Castleford Tigers	14	101,542	7,253	9,316	5,323
Catalans Dragons	14	143,560	10,560	31,555	7,237
Huddersfield Giants	14	73,133	5,222	6,809	4,451
Hull FC	14	160,694	11,478	20,044	9,830
Hull KR	14	114,587	8,185	12,100	7,065
Leeds Rhinos	14	165,742	11,838	14,085	11,229
London Broncos	14	28,297	2,021	3,051	1,133
Salford Red Devils	14	51,476	3,676	5,393	2,368
St Helens	15	178,639	11,910	17,088	9,090
Wakefield Trinity	14	76,554	5,468	6,785	4,270
Warrington Wolves	15	159,182	10,970	14,211	5,627
Wigan Warriors	16	182,914	11,432	22,050	9,247

Top 10 attendances

Rank	Home club	Away club	Stadium	Attendance
1	St Helens	Salford Red Devils	Old Trafford	64,102
2	Catalans Dragons	Wigan Warriors	Camp Nou	31,555
3	Magic Weekend: Day 1		Anfield	30,057
4	Magic Weekend: Day 2		Anfield	26,812
5	Wigan Warriors	St Helens	DW Stadium	22,050
6	Hull FC	Hull Kingston Rovers	KCOM Stadium	20,044
7	St Helens	Wigan Warriors	Totally Wicked Stadium	17,088
8	St Helens	Warrington Wolves	Totally Wicked Stadium	17,078
9	St Helens	Wigan Warriors	Totally Wicked Stadium	16,508
10	St Helens	Wigan Warriors	Totally Wicked Stadium	14,508

* As of 12 October 2019
