= 2018 Catalans Dragons season =

- 2018 Challenge Cup champions

Team information
- Head Coach: Bernard Guasch
- Captain: Rémi Casty
- Stadium: Stade Gilbert Brutus; Perpignan, France
← 2017	List of seasons	2019 →

This article details the Catalans Dragons Rugby League Football Club's 2018 season.

== Results ==
=== Super League ===
==== League table ====
Pos	Team	Pld	W	D	L	PF	PA	PD	Pts	Qualification
1	St. Helens	23	21	0	2	713	298	+415	42	Super League Super 8s
2	Wigan Warriors	23	16	0	7	573	345	+228	32	Super League Super 8s
3	Castleford Tigers	23	15	1	7	567	480	+87	31	Super League Super 8s
4	Warrington Wolves	23	14	1	8	531	410	+121	29	Super League Super 8s
5	Huddersfield Giants	23	11	1	11	427	629	−202	23	Super League Super 8s
6	Hull F.C.	23	11	0	12	534	544	−10	22	Super League Super 8s
7	Wakefield Trinity	23	10	1	12	581	506	+75	21	Super League Super 8s
8	Catalans Dragons	23	10	1	12	488	531	−43	21	Super League Super 8s
9	Leeds Rhinos	23	8	2	13	441	527	−86	18	The Qualifiers
10	Hull KR	23	8	1	14	476	582	−106	17	The Qualifiers
11	Salford Red Devils	23	7	0	16	384	597	−213	14	The Qualifiers
12	Widnes Vikings	23	3	0	20	387	653	−266	6	The Qualifiers

Source: Rugby League Project

==== Super League results ====
W Win D Draw L Loss

Super League results
Date	Round	Versus	H/A	Venue	Result	Score	Tries	Goals	Attendance	Report
4 February	1	Widnes Vikings	A	Select Security Stadium	L	12–40	Jullien, Mead	Walsh (2)	4,568	RLP
10 February	2	St Helens	H	Stade Gilbert Brutus	L	12–21	Costa, Mead	Albert (2)	8,103	RLP
15 February	12	Hull Kingston Rovers	A	KCOM Craven Park	L	4–23	Mead		6,711	RLP
24 February	3	Wakefield Trinity	H	Stade Gilbert Brutus	L	14–16	Garcia, Tierney	Albert (2)	6,872	RLP
10 March	5	Hull Kingston Rovers	H	Stade Gilbert Brutus	W	18–16			7,342	RLP
17 March	6	Warrington Wolves	H	Stade Gilbert Brutus	L	0–26			6,403	RLP
23 March	7	Hull F.C.	A	KCOM Stadium	L	16–42			10,347	RLP
30 March	8	Salford Red Devils	A	AJ Bell Stadium	L	16–32			2,328	RLP
2 April	9	Huddersfield Giants	H	Stade Gilbert Brutus	W	27–6			8,853	RLP
7 April	10	Wigan Warriors	H	Stade Gilbert Brutus	L	23–32			28,387	RLP
15 April	11	Castleford Tigers	A	Mend-A-Hose Jungle	L	0–41			7,137	RLP
28 April	13	Hull F.C.	H	Stade Gilbert Brutus	W	25–24			8,823	RLP
3 May	14	St Helens	A	Totally Wicked Stadium	L	12–26			9,138	RLP
20 May	15	Salford Red Devils	N	St James' Park	W	26–12			25,438	RLP
26 May	16	Leeds Rhinos	H	Stade Gilbert Brutus	W	33–20			8,779	RLP
9 June	17	Widnes Vikings	H	Stade Gilbert Brutus	W	32–12			9,239	RLP
15 June	18	Huddersfield Giants	A	John Smiths Stadium	L	25–26			9,121	RLP
20 June	4	Leeds Rhinos	A	Headingley	W	28–25	Drinkwater, Edwards (2), Langi, Tierney, Yaha	Drinkwater (2)	10,366	RLP
30 June	19	Castleford Tigers	H	Stade Gilbert Brutus	W	44–16			10,236	RLP
7 July	20	Wakefield Trinity	A	Mobile Rocket Stadium	W	35–18			5,079	RLP
12 July	21	Warrington Wolves	A	Halliwell Jones Stadium	D	22–22			8,807	RLP
21 July	22	Salford Red Devils	H	Stade Gilbert Brutus	W	44–10			8,672	RLP
27 July	23	Wigan Warriors	A	DW Stadium	L	20–25			10,656	RLP

=== Super 8s ===
==== Super 8s table ====
Pos	Team	Pld	W	D	L	PF	PA	PD	Pts	Qualification
1	St. Helens (L)	30	26	0	4	895	408	+487	52	Semi-finals
2	Wigan Warriors (C)	30	23	0	7	740	417	+323	46	Semi-finals
3	Castleford Tigers	30	20	1	9	767	582	+185	41	Semi-finals
4	Warrington Wolves	30	18	1	11	767	561	+206	37	Semi-finals
5	Wakefield Trinity	30	13	1	16	747	696	+51	27	
6	Huddersfield Giants	30	13	1	16	539	794	−255	27	
7	Catalans Dragons	30	12	1	17	596	750	−154	25	
8	Hull F.C.	30	11	0	19	615	787	−172	22	

Source: Rugby League Project
(C) Champions; (L) League Leaders' Shield Winners

==== Super 8s results ====
Super 8s results
Date	Round	Versus	H/A	Venue	Result	Score	Tries	Goals	Attendance	Report
10 August	S1	Warrington Wolves	A	Halliwell Jones Stadium	L	6–56			8,032	RLP
18 August	S2	Wigan Warriors	H	Stade Gilbert Brutus	L	6–35			6,739	RLP
1 September	S3	Castleford Tigers	A	Mend-A-Hose Jungle	L	4–36			7,658	RLP
8 September	S4	St Helens	H	Stade Gilbert Brutus	L	22–26			7,190	RLP
14 September	S5	Wakefield Trinity	H	Stade Gilbert Brutus	L	22–34			4,030	RLP
22 September	S6	Hull F.C.	A	KCOM Stadium	W	26–20			10,467	RLP
29 September	S7	Huddersfield Giants	H	Stade Gilbert Brutus	W	22–12			7,304	RLP

=== Challenge Cup ===
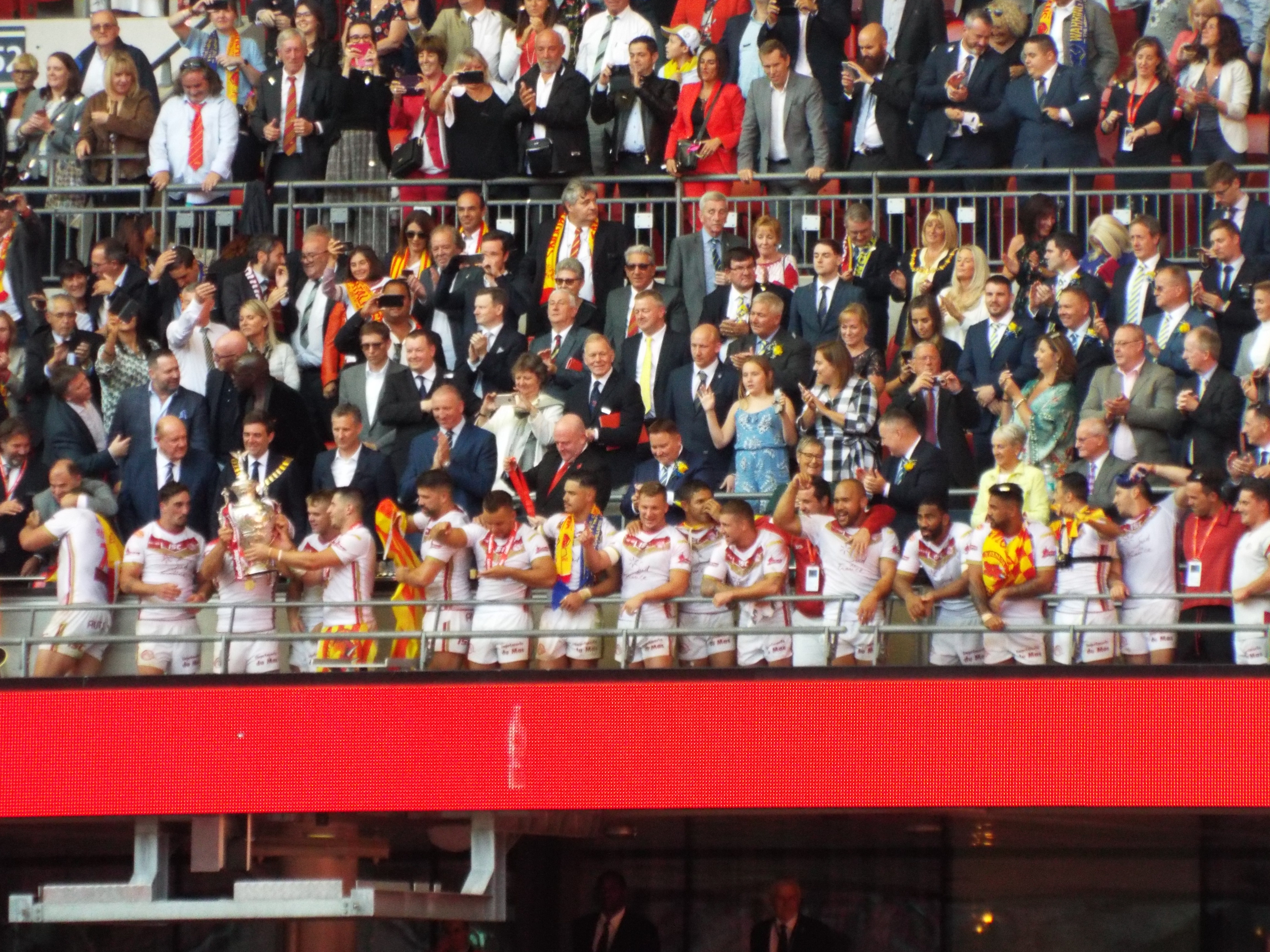
Catalans celebrating winning the Challenge Cup at for the first time

W Win L Loss

Challenge Cup results
Date	Round	Versus	H/A	Venue	Result	Score	Tries	Goals	Attendance	Report
22 April	5	York City Knights	A	Bootham Crescent	W	34–22	Albert, Baitieri, Bird, Broughton, Simon, Yaha	Albert (5)	3,081	RLP
12 May	6	Whitehaven	H	Stade Gilbert Brutus	W	56–10	Bousquet, Broughton (3), Drinkwater, Duport, Gigot, Goudemand (2), Maria, Mcilorum	Drinkwater (6)	2,533	RLP
31 May	Quarter-Finals	Huddersfield Giants	A	John Smith's Stadium	W	20–6	Bird, Mead	Drinkwater (6)	2,151	RLP
5 August	Semi-Finals	St. Helens	N	University of Bolton Stadium	W	35–16	Garcia, Gigot (2), Moa, Tierney	Drinkwater (7), Gigot (FG)	26,086	RLP
25 August	Final	Warrington Wolves	N	Wembley Stadium	W	20–14	Garcia, Tierney, Wiliame	Drinkwater (4)	50,672	RLP
