= 2017 Super 8s =

- League: Rugby League Super 8s
- Duration: 7 Rounds (Followed by 2 rounds of relevant playoffs)
- Teams: 39
- Highest attendance: 72,827 ( Castleford Tigers Vs Leeds Rhinos) (7 October 2017)
- Lowest attendance: 65 ( Oxford Vs South Wales Ironmen) (20 August 2017)
- Total attendance: 475,420
- Broadcast partners: (United Kingdom) Sky Sports (United Kingdom) BBC Sport (United Kingdom) SLTV; Fox Sports (Australia) (France) beIN Sport (United States) Fox Soccer Plus (Europe) Sport Klub

2017 season
- Champions: Super League; Leeds Rhinos; Qualifiers; Warrington Wolves; Championship Shield; Toulouse Olympique; League 1 Toronto Wolfpack; League 1 Shield; Hunslet
- League Leaders Shield: Castleford Tigers
- Runners-up: Castleford Tigers
- Biggest home win: Bradford Bulls 72–16 Rochdale Hornets (17 September 2017)
- Biggest away win: Workington Town 0–68 Toronto Wolfpack (6 August 2017) / Featherstone Rovers 0–68 Warrington Wolves (17 September 2017)
- Man of Steel Awards: Luke Gale (Castleford Tigers)
- Top try-scorer: Greg Eden (Castleford Tigers) (38)

Promotion and relegation
- Promoted from Championship League 1: Hull Kingston Rovers Toronto Wolfpack; Barrow Raiders
- Relegated to Championship League 1: Leigh Centurions Oldham; Bradford Bulls

The 2017 Super 8s were the third season of the Rugby Football League domestic competition in which the format of splitting teams after a certain number of games have been played.

The format was employed across all three divisions and was used to decide championships, promotion and relegation.

For the clubs in Super League XXII the split came after 23 games. The top eight clubs played each other once more before the top four team entered the playoffs for a place in the Super League Grand Final. In this group, points amassed during the regular season were carried forward to the Super 8 stage.

The four teams finishing bottom of the Super League after 23 rounds went into a group of eight with the four teams who finished top of the Championship. Again the teams played each other once with the top three finishers after this stage plus the club who finished fifth (Catalans Dragons) playing in Super League XXIII while the other four will play in the 2018 Championship. This group of eight was also known as the Qualifiers and was the only Super 8 group in which points amassed during the regular season were not carried forward to the group stage.

The other eight teams in the Championship competed for the Championship Shield with the top four going through to the Shield play-off semi-finals. The two teams finishing bottom of this group were relegated to League 1.

In League 1 the top eight teams after the regular season of 15 games formed a group. The format for 2017 has been varied slightly from previous years in that the team finishing top of this Super 8 group will automatically be promoted to the Championship with the next four teams going through to the play-off semi-finals. Previously the top two teams played in the League 1 Grand Final with the winner being promoted and the loser going into the play-off semi-finals with the teams finishing third, fourth and fifth.

The bottom eight teams in League 1 played each other for the League 1 Shield in a format identical to the Championship Shield except that there is no relegation from League 1.

== Super League ==
=== Super 8's ===
The Super League Super 8s sees the top eight teams from the Super League play seven games each. Each team's points are carried over and after seven rounds the top four teams will contest the play off semi-finals with the team finishing first hosting the team in fourth, and the team finishing second hosting the third placed team; the winners of these semi-finals will contest the Super League Grand Final at Old Trafford.

=== Round 1 ===
Home	Score	Away	Match Information
Home	Score	Away	Date and Time	Venue	Referee	Attendance
Castleford Tigers	12–26	St. Helens	3 August 2017, 20:00	Mend-A-Hose Jungle	Robert Hicks	6,849
Huddersfield Giants	36–6	Wakefield Trinity	4 August 2017, 20:00	John Smith's Stadium	Tom Grant	5,429
Hull	32–18	Salford Red Devils	4 August 2017, 20:00	KCOM Stadium	Jack Smith	10,239
Leeds Rhinos	32–16	Wigan Warriors	4 August 2017, 20:00	Headingley Carnegie	Ben Thaler	13,579

=== Round 2 ===
Home	Score	Away	Match Information
Home	Score	Away	Date and Time	Venue	Referee	Attendance
Wakefield Trinity	38–6	Leeds Rhinos	10 August 2017, 20:00	Beaumont Legal Stadium	Ben Thaler	5,607
Salford Red Devils	4–23	Castleford Tigers	11 August 2017, 20:00	AJ Bell Stadium	Chris Kendall	2,811
St. Helens	6–8	Hull	11 August 2017, 20:00	Totally Wicked Stadium	James Child	10,338
Wigan Warriors	18–4	Huddersfield Giants	11 August 2017, 20:00	DW Stadium	Phil Bentham	10,619

=== Round 3 ===
Home	Score	Away	Match Information
Home	Score	Away	Date and Time	Venue	Referee	Attendance
Castleford Tigers	45–20	Wakefield Trinity	17 August 2017, 20:00	Mend-A-Hose Jungle	James Child	11,235
Hull	18–46	Huddersfield Giants	18 August 2017, 20:00	KCOM Stadium	Scott Mikalauskas	10,535
Leeds Rhinos	16–14	St. Helens	18 August 2017, 20:00	Headingley Carnegie	Ben Thaler	16,326
Wigan Warriors	42–6	Salford Red Devils	18 August 2017, 20:00	DW Stadium	Chris Kendall	11,229

=== Round 4 ===
Home	Score	Away	Match Information
Home	Score	Away	Date and Time	Venue	Referee	Attendance
Leeds Rhinos	38–26	Hull	31 August 2017, 20:00	Headingley Carnegie	James Child	13,219
Huddersfield Giants	16–24	Castleford Tigers	1 September 2017, 20:00	John Smith's Stadium	Scott Mikalauskas	6,284
Salford Red Devils	18–43	Wakefield Trinity	1 September 2017, 20:00	AJ Bell Stadium	Phil Bentham	2,489
St. Helens	16–26	Wigan Warriors	1 September 2017, 20:00	Totally Wicked Stadium	Robert Hicks	15,248

=== Round 5 ===
Home	Score	Away	Match Information
Home	Score	Away	Date and Time	Venue	Referee	Attendance
Wakefield Trinity	16–18	St. Helens	7 September 2017, 20:00	Beaumont Legal Stadium	Ben Thaler	4,837
Castleford Tigers	38–24	Leeds Rhinos	8 September 2017, 20:00	Mend-A-Hose Jungle	Jack Smith	9,557
Hull	22–30	Wigan Warriors	8 September 2017, 20:00	KCOM Stadium	Robert Hicks	11,291
Salford Red Devils	52–14	Huddersfield Giants	9 September 2017, 13:30	AJ Bell Stadium	James Child	1,405

=== Round 6 ===
Home	Score	Away	Match Information
Home	Score	Away	Date and Time	Venue	Referee	Attendance
Hull	19–18	Wakefield Trinity	14 September 2017, 20:00	KCOM Stadium	Phil Bentham	10,921
Leeds Rhinos	44–2	Salford Red Devils	15 September 2017, 20:00	Headingley Carnegie	Liam Moore	13,094
St. Helens	40–16	Huddersfield Giants	15 September 2017, 20:00	Totally Wicked Stadium	Gareth Hewer	9,419
Wigan Warriors	20–38	Castleford Tigers	17 September 2017, 15:00	DW Stadium	Ben Thaler	15,706

=== Round 7 ===
Home	Score	Away	Match Information
Home	Score	Away	Date and Time	Venue	Referee	Attendance
Salford Red Devils	4–30	St Helens	21 September 2017, 20:00	AJ Bell Stadium	James Child	2,840
Castleford Tigers	16–48	Hull	22 September 2017, 20:00	Mend-A-Hose Jungle	Ben Thaler	8,894
Huddersfield Giants	12–36	Leeds Rhinos	22 September 2017, 20:00	John Smith's Stadium	Scott Mikalauskas	6,247
Wakefield Trinity	32–0	Wigan Warriors	23 September 2017, 15:15	Beaumont Legal Stadium	Robert Hicks	5,155

=== Final standings ===
Pos	Team	Pld	W	D	L	PF	PA	PD	Pts	Qualification
1	Castleford Tigers (L)	30	25	0	5	965	536	+429	50	Semi-finals
2	Leeds Rhinos (C)	30	20	0	10	749	623	+126	40	Semi-finals
3	Hull F.C.	30	17	1	12	714	655	+59	35	Semi-finals
4	St Helens	30	16	1	13	663	518	+145	33	Semi-finals
5	Wakefield Trinity	30	16	0	14	714	679	+35	32	
6	Wigan Warriors	30	14	3	13	691	668	+23	31	
7	Salford Red Devils	30	14	0	16	680	728	−48	28	
8	Huddersfield Giants	30	11	3	16	663	680	−17	25	

(C) Champions; (L) League Leaders Shield

=== Play-offs ===
#	Home	Score	Away	Match Information
#	Home	Score	Away	Date and Time (Local)	Venue	Referee	Attendance
Semi-finals
SF1	Castleford Tigers	23–22 (Note: After extra time)	St. Helens	28 September 2017, 19:45 BST	Mend-A-Hose Jungle	James Child	11,235
SF2	Leeds Rhinos	18–16	Hull	29 September 2017, 19:45 BST	Headingley Carnegie	Phil Bentham	12,500
Grand final
F	Castleford Tigers	6–24	Leeds Rhinos	7 October 2017, 18:00 BST	Old Trafford	James Child	72,827

== The Qualifiers ==
The Qualifiers Super 8s sees the bottom 4 teams from Super League table join the top 4 teams from the Championship. The points totals are reset to zero and each team plays seven games each, playing every other team once. After seven games each the teams finishing 1st, 2nd, and 3rd will gain qualification to the 2018 Super League season. The teams finishing 4th and 5th will play in the "Million Pound Game" at the home of the 4th place team which will earn the winner a place in Super League XXIII; the loser, along with teams finishing 6th, 7th and 8th, will be relegated to the Championship for 2018.

=== Round 1 ===
Home	Score	Away	Match Information
Home	Score	Away	Date and Time	Venue	Referee	Attendance
Widnes Vikings	14–28	Warrington Wolves	4 August 2017, 20:00	Select Security Stadium	Phil Bentham	6,202
Featherstone Rovers	12–38	Leigh Centurions	5 August 2017, 15:15	Post Office Road	James Child	2,679
Catalans Dragons	20–18	London Broncos	5 August 2017, 17:15	Stade Gilbert Brutus	Chris Kendall	7,102
Hull Kingston Rovers	26–22	Halifax	6 August 2017, 15:00	KC Lightstream Stadium	Liam Moore	7,706

=== Round 2 ===
Home	Score	Away	Match Information
Home	Score	Away	Date and Time	Venue	Referee	Attendance
Warrington Wolves	52–24	Catalans Dragons	12 August 2017, 15:00	Halliwell Jones Stadium	Robert Hicks	8,595
Leigh Centurions	16–20	Hull Kingston Rovers	12 August 2017, 15:15	Leigh Sports Village	Jack Smith	5,335
Halifax	12–36	Widnes Vikings	13 August 2017, 15:00	The MBI Shay	Gareth Hewer	2,291
London Broncos	32–32	Featherstone Rovers	13 August 2017, 15:00	Trailfinders Sports Ground	Liam Moore	926

=== Round 3 ===
Home	Score	Away	Match Information
Home	Score	Away	Date and Time	Venue	Referee	Attendance
Warrington Wolves	22–8	Halifax	19 August 2017, 15:15	Halliwell Jones Stadium	Robert Hicks	8,353
Catalans Dragons	6–30	Leigh Centurions	19 August 2017, 17:15	Stade Gilbert Brutus	Phil Bentham	6,632
Hull Kingston Rovers	35–30	London Broncos	20 August 2017, 15:00	KC Lightstream Stadium	Chris Campbell	7,235
Widnes Vikings	58–10	Featherstone Rovers	20 August 2017, 15:00	Select Security Stadium	Gareth Hewer	4,373

=== Round 4 ===
Home	Score	Away	Match Information
Home	Score	Away	Date and Time	Venue	Referee	Attendance
London Broncos	38–40	Warrington Wolves	2 September 2017, 20:00	Trailfinders Sports Ground	Liam Moore	1,577
Featherstone Rovers	18–30	Hull Kingston Rovers	3 September 2017, 15:00	Post Office Road	Gareth Hewer	4,583
Halifax RLFC	0–24	Catalans Dragons	3 September 2017, 15:00	The MBI Shay	Chris Kendall	1,853
Leigh Centurions	8–24	Widnes Vikings	3 September 2017, 15:00	Leigh Sports Village	Ben Thaler	6,209

=== Round 5 ===
Home	Score	Away	Match Information
Home	Score	Away	Date and Time	Venue	Referee	Attendance
Warrington Wolves	32–30	Leigh Centurions	9 September 2017, 15:00	Halliwell Jones Stadium	Phil Bentham	9,798
Hull Kingston Rovers	12–6	Widnes Vikings	9 September 2017, 15:15	KC Lightstream Stadium	Gareth Hewer	8,227
Catalans Dragons	26–12	Featherstone Rovers	9 September 2017, 17:15	Stade Gilbert Brutus	Liam Moore	8,649
London Broncos	36–14	Halifax RLFC	10 September 2017, 15:00	Trailfinders Sports Ground	Scott Mikalauskas	794

=== Round 6 ===
Home	Score	Away	Match Information
Home	Score	Away	Date and Time	Venue	Referee	Attendance
Hull Kingston Rovers	19–20	Catalans Dragons	15 September 2017, 20:00	KC Lightstream Stadium	Robert Hicks	7,405
Leigh Centurions	40–6	Halifax	15 September 2017, 20:00	Leigh Sports Village	Chris Kendall	4,341
Widnes Vikings	38–16	London Broncos	16 September 2017, 15:15	Select Security Stadium	James Child	4,341
Featherstone Rovers	0–68	Warrington Wolves	17 September 2017, 15:00	Post Office Road	Scott Mikalauskas	2,441

=== Round 7 ===
Home	Score	Away	Match Information
Home	Score	Away	Date and Time	Venue	Referee	Attendance
London Broncos	4–41	Leigh Centurions	22 September 2017, 20:00	Trailfinders Sports Ground	Chris Kendall	1,234
Warrington Wolves	46–24	Hull Kingston Rovers	23 September 2017, 15:00	Halliwell Jones Stadium	Gareth Hewer	10,466
Catalans Dragons	10–12	Widnes Vikings	23 September 2017, 17:15	Stade Gilbert Brutus	Phil Bentham	10,245
Halifax	20-26	Featherstone Rovers	24 September 2017, 15:00	The MBI Shay	Tom Grant	2,057

=== Final standings ===
Pos	Team	Pld	W	D	L	PF	PA	PD	Pts	Qualification
1	Warrington Wolves	7	7	0	0	288	138	+150	14	Super League XXIII
2	Widnes Vikings	7	5	0	2	188	96	+92	10	Super League XXIII
3	Hull Kingston Rovers (P)	7	5	0	2	166	158	+8	10	Super League XXIII
4	Leigh Centurions (R)	7	4	0	3	203	104	+99	8	Million Pound Game
5	Catalans Dragons	7	4	0	3	130	143	−13	8	Million Pound Game
6	London Broncos	7	1	1	5	174	220	−46	3	2018 Championship
7	Featherstone Rovers	7	1	1	5	110	272	−162	3	2018 Championship
8	Halifax	7	0	0	7	82	210	−128	0	2018 Championship

(P) Promoted to Super League; (R) Relegated

=== Million Pound Game ===
Home	Score	Away	Match Information
Home	Score	Away	Date and Time	Venue	Referee	Attendance
Leigh Centurions	10–26	Catalans Dragons	30 September 2017, 15:00	Leigh Sports Village	Ben Thaler	6,888

== Championship Shield ==
At the end of the regular season the bottom 8 Championship teams play each other once more, home or away. The bottom two teams are then relegated to League 1 and the top four teams qualify for the play-offs for the Championship Shield.

=== Round 1 ===
Home	Score	Away	Match Information
Home	Score	Away	Date and Time	Venue	Referee	Attendance
Batley Bulldogs	62–10	Swinton Lions	6 August 2017, 15:00	Fox's Biscuits Stadium	Gareth Hewer	544
Bradford Bulls	10–26	Toulouse Olympique	6 August 2017, 15:00	Provident Stadium	John McMullen	2,753
Dewsbury Rams	56–8	Rochdale Hornets	6 August 2017, 15:00	Tetley's Stadium	Chris Campbell	629
Sheffield Eagles	56–16	Oldham	6 August 2017, 15:00	Belle Vue	Andy Sweet	305

=== Round 2 ===
Home	Score	Away	Match Information
Home	Score	Away	Date and Time	Venue	Referee	Attendance
Dewsbury Rams	36–34	Toulouse Olympique	13 August 2017, 15:00	Tetley's Stadium	Scott Mikalauskas	628
Oldham	16–20	Bradford Bulls	13 August 2017, 15:00	Bower Fold	John McMullen	853
Rochdale Hornets	14–34	Batley Bulldogs	13 August 2017, 15:00	Spotland Stadium	Tom Grant	453
Swinton Lions	30–32	Sheffield Eagles	13 August 2017, 15:00	Heywood Road	Chris Campbell	434

=== Round 3 ===
Home	Score	Away	Match Information
Home	Score	Away	Date and Time	Venue	Referee	Attendance
Toulouse Olympique	50–12	Rochdale Hornets	19 August 2017, 19:00	Stade Ernest-Argelès	Liam Moore	612
Batley Bulldogs	22–22	Oldham	20 August 2017, 15:00	Fox's Biscuits Stadium	Jack Smith	675
Sheffield Eagles	28–35	Dewsbury Rams	20 August 2017, 15:00	Belle Vue	N Bennett	363
Swinton Lions	16–30	Bradford Bulls	20 August 2017, 15:00	Heywood Road	Andy Sweet	660

=== Round 4 ===
Home	Score	Away	Match Information
Home	Score	Away	Date and Time	Venue	Referee	Attendance
Bradford Bulls	18–44	Batley Bulldogs	28 August 2017, 15:00	Provident Stadium	Callum Straw	2,609
Dewsbury Rams	28–35	Swinton Lions	28 August 2017, 15:00	Tetley's Stadium	John McMullen	812
Rochdale Hornets	24–30	Oldham	28 August 2017, 15:00	Spotland Stadium	Gareth Hewer	927
Toulouse Olympique	32–16	Sheffield Eagles	28 August 2017, 19:00	Stade Ernest-Argelès	S Race	1,855

=== Round 5 ===
Home	Score	Away	Match Information
Home	Score	Away	Date and Time	Venue	Referee	Attendance
Batley Bulldogs	38–0	Dewsbury Rams	3 September 2017, 15:00	Fox's Biscuits Stadium	John McMullen	906
Oldham	18–24	Toulouse Olympique	3 September 2017, 15:00	Bower Fold	Andy Sweet	581
Rochdale Hornets	16–8	Swinton Lions	3 September 2017, 15:00	Spotland Stadium	Jack Smith	606
Sheffield Eagles	18–32	Bradford Bulls	3 September 2017, 15:00	Beaumont Legal Stadium	Tom Grant	896

=== Round 6 ===
Home	Score	Away	Match Information
Home	Score	Away	Date and Time	Venue	Referee	Attendance
Toulouse Olympique	56-14	Batley Bulldogs	9 September 2017, 15:00	Stade Ernest-Argelès	M Rossleigh	868
Dewsbury Rams	12–16	Bradford Bulls	10 September 2017, 15:00	Tetley's Stadium	N Bennett	1,369
Sheffield Eagles	26–22	Rochdale Hornets	10 September 2017, 15:00	Beaumont Legal Stadium	Gary Dolan	297
Swinton Lions	29–6	Oldham R.L.F.C.	10 September 2017, 15:00	Heywood Road	Chris Kendall	1,051

=== Round 7 ===
Home	Score	Away	Match Information
Home	Score	Away	Date and Time	Venue	Referee	Attendance
Toulouse Olympique	28–24	Swinton Lions	16 September 2017, 18:00	Stade Ernest-Argelès	M Rossleigh	1,073
Batley Bulldogs	34–18	Sheffield Eagles	17 September 2017, 15:00	Fox's Biscuits Stadium	S Race	650
Bradford Bulls	72–16	Rochdale Hornets	17 September 2017, 15:00	Provident Stadium	Andy Sweet	3,604
Oldham	22–29	Dewsbury Rams	17 September 2017, 15:00	Bower Fold	Gary Dolan	429

=== Final standings ===
Pos	Team	Pld	W	D	L	PF	PA	PD	Pts	Qualification or relegation
1	Toulouse Olympique	30	21	0	9	980	605	+375	42	Shield semi-final
2	Batley Bulldogs	30	16	1	13	797	801	−4	33	Shield semi-final
3	Sheffield Eagles	30	13	0	17	762	986	−224	26	Shield semi-final
4	Dewsbury Rams	30	12	0	18	584	917	−333	24	Shield semi-final
5	Rochdale Hornets	30	8	1	21	548	963	−415	17	Remain in Championship
6	Swinton Lions	30	8	0	22	629	862	−233	16	Remain in Championship
7	Oldham	30	6	2	22	530	939	−409	14	Relegated to League 1
8	Bradford Bulls (Note: Bradford Bulls deducted 12 points on 3 January 2017 for entering administration.)	30	11	0	19	698	867	−169	10	Relegated to League 1

=== Play-offs ===
Home	Score	Away	Match Information
Home	Score	Away	Date and Time (Local)	Venue	Referee	Attendance
Semi-finals
Toulouse Olympique	36–22	Dewsbury Rams	23 September 2017, 15:30	Stade Ernest-Argelès	J Smith	1,208
Batley Bulldogs	26–28	Sheffield Eagles	24 September 2017, 15:00	Fox's Biscuits Stadium	M Rossleigh	550
Championship Shield Final
Toulouse Olympique	44–14	Sheffield Eagles	30 September 2017, 14:30 BST	Stade Ernest-Argelès	G Hewer	1,528

== League 1 Super 8s ==
The top eight teams in League 1 carry points forward and play each other once more home or away. After seven games the top team will be promoted to the Championship for 2018 while the teams finishing second to fifth will enter the playoffs.

=== Round 1 ===
Home	Score	Away	Match Information
Home	Score	Away	Date and Time	Venue	Referee	Attendance
Doncaster	24–32	Keighley Cougars	30 July, 15:00	Keepmoat Stadium	J Roberts	501
Newcastle Thunder	14–30	Workington Town	30 July, 15:00	Kingston Park	A Sweet	655
Whitehaven	2–15	Barrow Raiders	30 July, 15:00	Recreation Ground	G Hewer	1,062
York City Knights	26–16	Toronto Wolfpack	30 July, 15:00	Bootham Crescent	T Grant	2,602

=== Round 2 ===
Home	Score	Away	Match Information
Home	Score	Away	Date and Time	Venue	Referee	Attendance
Barrow Raiders	14–10	Doncaster	6 August, 15:00	Craven Park	G Dolan	836
Keighley Cougars	22–20	York City Knights	6 August, 15:00	Cougar Park	C Straw	1,362
Whitehaven	27–6	Newcastle Thunder	6 August, 15:00	Recreation Ground	S Race	539
Workington Town	0–68	Toronto Wolfpack	6 August, 15:00	Derwent Park	J Roberts	592

=== Round 3 ===
Home	Score	Away	Match Information
Home	Score	Away	Date and Time	Venue	Referee	Attendance
Newcastle Thunder	28–30	Barrow Raiders	12 August, 19:00	Kingston Park	C Straw	850
Doncaster	30–22	Whitehaven	13 August, 15:00	Keepmoat Stadium	G Dolan	525
Keighley Cougars	26–26	Toronto Wolfpack	13 August, 15:00	Cougar Park	A Sweet	922
York City Knights	28–18	Workington Town	13 August, 15:00	Bootham Crescent	N Bennett	1,122

=== Round 4 ===
Home	Score	Away	Match Information
Home	Score	Away	Date and Time	Venue	Referee	Attendance
Toronto Wolfpack	50–0	Newcastle Thunder	19 August, 21:30	Lamport Stadium	B Robinson	7,522
Barrow Raiders	26–19	York City Knights	20 August, 15:00	Craven Park	J Roberts	977
Whitehaven	36–4	Keighley Cougars	20 August, 15:00	Recreation Ground	G Dolan	562
Workington Town	22–21	Doncaster	20 August, 15:00	Derwent Park	T Crashley	441

=== Round 5 ===
Home	Score	Away	Match Information
Home	Score	Away	Date and Time	Venue	Referee	Attendance
Toronto Wolfpack	36–18	Whitehaven	2 September, 21:30	Lamport Stadium	N Bennett	6,134
Barrow Raiders	36–14	Workington Town	3 September, 15:00	Craven Park	S Race	1,021
Newcastle Thunder	34–8	Keighley Cougars	3 September, 15:00	Kingston Park	L Staveley	791
York City Knights	21–21	Doncaster	3 September, 15:00	Bootham Crescent	B Robinson	1,107

=== Round 6 ===
Home	Score	Away	Match Information
Home	Score	Away	Date and Time	Venue	Referee	Attendance
Toronto Wolfpack	26–2	Barrow Raiders	9 September, 21:30	Lamport Stadium	John McCullen	7,972
Doncaster	24–28	Newcastle Thunder	10 September, 15:00	Keepmoat Stadium	John Roberts	536
Keighley Cougars	28–6	Workington Town	10 September, 15:00	Cougar Park	Tom Grant	661
Whitehaven	26–16	York City Knights	10 September, 15:00	Recreation Ground	Tom Crashley	605

=== Round 7 ===
Home	Score	Away	Match Information
Home	Score	Away	Date and Time	Venue	Referee	Attendance
Toronto Wolfpack	26–14	Doncaster	16 September, 21:30	Lamport Stadium	B Pearson	8,456
Barrow Raiders	32–18	Keighley Cougars	17 September, 15:00	Craven Park	N Bennett	1,007
Workington Town	6–56	Whitehaven	17 September, 15:00	Derwent Park	J Smith	927
York City Knights	24–26	Newcastle Thunder	17 September, 15:00	Bootham Crescent	J McMullen	1,181

=== Final standings ===
Pos	Team	Pld	W	D	L	PF	PA	PD	Pts	Promotion or qualification
1	Toronto Wolfpack	22	20	1	1	1164	243	+921	41	Promoted as Champions
2	Barrow Raiders	22	18	1	3	731	381	+350	37	Play-off semi-finals
3	Whitehaven	22	17	1	4	656	349	+307	35	Play-off semi-finals
4	York City Knights	22	12	1	9	641	460	+181	25	Play-off semi-finals
5	Newcastle Thunder	22	12	0	10	595	521	+74	24	Play-off semi-finals
6	Doncaster	22	10	3	9	593	492	+101	23	Eliminated
7	Keighley Cougars	22	10	2	10	728	565	+163	22	Eliminated
8	Workington Town	22	9	1	12	532	621	−89	19	Eliminated

=== Play-offs ===
Home	Score	Away	Match Information
Home	Score	Away	Date and Time (Local)	Venue	Referee	Attendance
Semi-finals
Barrow Raiders	60–0	Newcastle Thunder	24 September 2017, 15:00	Craven Park	G Dolan	1,090
Whitehaven	21–20	York City Knights	24 September 2017, 15:00	Recreation Ground	J McMullen	853
Championship Shield Final
Barrow Raiders	10-6	Whitehaven	1 October 2017, 15:00	Craven Park	S Mikalauskas	3,128

== League 1 Shield ==
The bottom eight teams compete in the League 1 Shield where they play each other once more home or away. The top two teams compete for the League 1 Shield.

=== Round 1 ===
Home	Score	Away	Match Information
Home	Score	Away	Date and Time	Venue	Referee	Attendance
South Wales Ironmen	28–20	Gloucestershire All Golds	29 July, 15:00	Stebonheath Park	C Campbell	212
Hemel Stags	32–26	Oxford	30 July, 14:00	Pennine Way	M Rossleigh	106
North Wales Crusaders	12–40	London Skolars	30 July, 14:30	Queensway Stadium	B Robinson	268
Hunslet	56–10	Coventry Bears	30 July, 15:00	South Leeds Stadium	S Race	384

=== Round 2 ===
Home	Score	Away	Match Information
Home	Score	Away	Date and Time	Venue	Referee	Attendance
Gloucestershire All Golds	40–22	North Wales Crusaders	5 August, 15:00	Prince of Wales Stadium	A Whalley	211
Oxford	10–36	Hunslet	6 August, 14:00	Tilsley Park	J Jones	155
Coventry Bears	29–26	Hemel Stags	6 August, 15:00	Butts Park Arena	B Robinson	256
London Skolars	32–4	South Wales Ironmen	25 August, 18:30	New River Stadium	M Rossleigh	1,020

=== Round 3 ===
Home	Score	Away	Match Information
Home	Score	Away	Date and Time	Venue	Referee	Attendance
Gloucestershire All Golds	30–28	Coventry Bears	12 August, 15:00	Prince of Wales Stadium	G Poumes	178
London Skolars	66–0	Oxford	12 August, 15:00	New River Stadium	M Rossleigh	218
North Wales Crusaders	20–12	Hunslet	13 August, 14:30	Queensway Stadium	B Robinson	306
South Wales Ironmen	4–22	Hemel Stags	13 August, 15:00	Stebonheath Park	T Crashley	192

=== Round 4 ===
Home	Score	Away	Match Information
Home	Score	Away	Date and Time	Venue	Referee	Attendance
Hunslet	32–18	Gloucestershire All Golds	19 August, 15:00	South Leeds Stadium	C Straw	333
Hemel Stags	18–38	North Wales Crusaders	20 August, 14:00	Pennine Way	L Staveley	114
Oxford	22–22	South Wales Ironmen	20 August, 14:00	Tilsley Park	M Rossleigh	65
Coventry Bears	14–50	London Skolars	20 August, 15:00	Butts Park Arena	S Race	268

=== Round 5 ===
Home	Score	Away	Match Information
Home	Score	Away	Date and Time	Venue	Referee	Attendance
London Skolars	42–22	Hemel Stags	2 September, 15:00	New River Stadium	T Crashley	191
North Wales Crusaders	16–22	Coventry Bears	3 September, 14:30	Queensway Stadium	G Dolan	245
Gloucestershire All Golds	12–18	Oxford	3 September, 15:00	Prince of Wales Stadium	M Rossleigh	202
Hunslet	64–7	South Wales Ironmen	3 September, 15:00	South Leeds Stadium	J Roberts	418

=== Round 6 ===
Home	Score	Away	Match Information
Home	Score	Away	Date and Time	Venue	Referee	Attendance
Oxford	28–24	Coventry Bears	9 September, 14:00	Tilsley Park	S Race	110
London Skolars	16–6	Gloucestershire All Golds	9 September, 15:00	New River Stadium	B Robinson	218
South Wales Ironmen	6–54	North Wales Crusaders	9 September, 15:00	Stebonheath Park	M Mannifield	289
Hemel Stags	16–60	Hunslet	10 September, 15:00	Pennine Way	A Sweet	135

=== Round 7 ===
Home	Score	Away	Match Information
Home	Score	Away	Date and Time	Venue	Referee	Attendance
Coventry Bears	58–16	South Wales Ironmen	16 September, 15:00	Butts Park Arena	C Worsley	332
North Wales Crusaders	28–14	Oxford	17 September, 14:30	Queensway Stadium	J Roberts	303
Gloucestershire All Golds	42–28	Hemel Stags	17 September, 15:00	Prince of Wales Stadium	B Stead	305
Hunslet	18–12	London Skolars	17 September, 15:00	South Leeds Stadium	T Grant	450

=== Standings ===
Pos	Team	Pld	W	D	L	PF	PA	PD	Pts	Qualification
1	Hunslet	22	13	0	9	696	470	+226	26	League 1 Shield final
2	London Skolars	22	12	1	9	625	529	+96	25	League 1 Shield final
3	North Wales Crusaders	22	11	1	10	556	574	−18	23	
4	Gloucestershire All Golds	22	9	0	13	478	702	−224	18	
5	Oxford	22	6	1	15	393	849	−456	13	
6	Coventry Bears	22	5	0	17	472	837	−365	10	
7	Hemel Stags	22	3	0	19	393	1033	−640	6	
8	South Wales Ironmen	22	2	1	19	299	926	−627	5	

=== Final ===
Home	Score	Away	Match Information
Home	Score	Away	Date and Time	Venue	Referee	Attendance
Hunslet	32–12	London Skolars	24 September 2017, 15:00	South Leeds Stadium	N. Bennett	516
