= 2015 Super 8s =

- League: Rugby League Super 8s
- Duration: 7 Rounds (Followed by 2 rounds of relevant playoffs)
- Teams: 24
- Broadcast partners: (United Kingdom) Sky Sports (United Kingdom) BBC Sport (United Kingdom) SLTV; Fox Sports (Australia) (France) beIN Sport (United States) Fox Soccer Plus (Europe) Sport Klub

2015 season
- Winners: Super League; Leeds Rhinos; Qualifiers; Hull Kingston Rovers; Championship Shield; Featherstone Rovers

Promotion and relegation
- Relegated to Championship League 1: None; Hunslet; Doncaster

After 23 games the league table is frozen and the teams are split up into 2 of the 3 "Super 8's". Teams finishing in the top 8 will go on to contest "Super League" and will all retain a place in the competition for the next season, as they go on to play 7 more games each, as they compete for a place in the Grand Final. Teams finishing in the bottom four (9-12) will be put alongside the top 4 teams from the Championship, in "The Qualifiers" Super 8 group. Where these teams will reset their season standings to 0 and also play 7 extra games each, as they attempt to earn a place in the following Super League competition.

== Super League ==
The Super League Super 8s sees the top 8 teams from the Super League play 7 games each. Each team's points are carried over and after 7 additional games the top 4 teams will contest the play off semi-finals with the team in 1st hosting the team in 4th, and the team finishing 2nd hosting the 3rd placed team; the winners of these semi-finals will contest the Super League Grand Final at Old Trafford. Teams finishing 5th, 6th, 7th and 8th after the 7 additional games will take no further part in the 2015 season but will play in Super League again in 2016.

=== Round 1 ===
Home	Score	Away	Match Information
Home	Score	Away	Venue	Attendance
Wigan Warriors	30–22	Huddersfield Giants	DW Stadium	11,448
Leeds Rhinos	49–10	Warrington Wolves	Headingley Stadium	13,118
Castleford Tigers	36–30	Hull F.C.	Wheldon Road	6,760
Catalans Dragons	26–16	St. Helens		7,392

=== Round 2 ===
Home	Score	Away	Match Information
Home	Score	Away	Venue	Attendance
Castleford Tigers	17–16	Warrington Wolves	Wheldon Road	5,212
St. Helens	22–32	Hull F.C.	Langtree Park	10,203
Leeds Rhinos	25–18	Wigan Warriors	Headingley Stadium	15,026
Huddersfield Giants	24–12	Catalans Dragons	John Smith's Stadium	4,251

=== Round 3 ===
Home	Score	Away	Match Information
Home	Score	Away	Venue	Attendance
Hull F.C.	22–36	Leeds Rhinos	KC Stadium	10,649
St. Helens	22–28	Huddersfield Giants	Langtree Park	10,926
Warrington Wolves	0–28	Wigan Warriors	Halliwell Jones Stadium	10,095
Catalans Dragons	44–26	Castleford Tigers		7,473

=== Round 4 ===
Home	Score	Away	Match Information
Home	Score	Away	Venue	Attendance
Huddersfield Giants	40–26	Castleford Tigers	John Smith's Stadium	5,350
Leeds Rhinos	18–32	St. Helens	Headingley Stadium	16,142
Wigan Warriors	42– 16	Catalans Dragons	DW Stadium	8,101
Warrington Wolves	46–16	Hull F.C.	Halliwell Jones Stadium	8,076

=== Round 5 ===
Home	Score	Away	Match Information
Home	Score	Away	Venue	Attendance
Castleford Tigers	38–42	St. Helens	Wheldon Road	5,253
Wigan Warriors	30–24	Hull F.C.	DW Stadium	12,028
Catalans Dragons	46–16	Leeds Rhinos		8,851
Huddersfield Giants	48–10	Warrington Wolves	John Smith's Stadium	5,563

=== Round 6 ===
Home	Score	Away	Match Information
Home	Score	Away	Venue	Attendance
Leeds Rhinos	22–29	Castleford Tigers	Headingley Stadium	15,069
St. Helens	18–14	Wigan Warriors	Langtree Park	15,808
Hull F.C.	20–34	Huddersfield Giants	KC Stadium	9,332
Warrington Wolves	48–6	Catalans Dragons	Halliwell Jones Stadium	7,862

=== Round 7 ===
Home	Score	Away	Match Information
Home	Score	Away	Venue	Attendance
St. Helens	16–32	Warrington Wolves	Langtree Park	10,966
Wigan Warriors	47–12	Castleford Tigers	DW Stadium	15,070
Huddersfield Giants	16–20	Leeds Rhinos	John Smith's Stadium	9,326
Hull F.C.	24–28	Catalans Dragons	KC Stadium	10,832

=== Standings ===
Pos	Team	Pld	W	D	L	PF	PA	PD	Pts	Qualification
1	Leeds Rhinos (L, C)	30	20	1	9	944	650	+294	41	Semi-finals
2	Wigan Warriors	30	20	1	9	798	530	+268	41	Semi-finals
3	Huddersfield Giants	30	18	2	10	750	534	+216	38	Semi-finals
4	St Helens	30	19	0	11	766	624	+142	38	Semi-finals
5	Castleford Tigers	30	16	0	14	731	746	−15	32	
6	Warrington Wolves	30	15	0	15	714	636	+78	30	
7	Catalans Dragons	30	13	2	15	739	770	−31	28	
8	Hull F.C.	30	12	0	18	620	716	−96	24	

Source: Rugby League Project
(C) Champions; (L) League Leaders' Shield Winners

=== Play-offs ===
#	Home	Score	Away	Match Information
#	Home	Score	Away	Date and Time (Local)	Venue	Referee	Attendance
SEMI-FINALS
SF1	Wigan Warriors	32 – 8	Huddersfield Giants	1 October, 20:00 BST	DW Stadium	Ben Thaler	10,035
SF2	Leeds Rhinos	20–13	St. Helens	2 October, 20:00 BST	Headingley Carnegie Stadium		17,192
GRAND FINAL
F	Wigan Warriors	20– 22	Leeds Rhinos	10 October, 18:00 BST	Old Trafford, Manchester		73,032

== The Qualifiers ==
The Qualifiers Super 8s sees the bottom 4 teams from Super League table join the top 4 teams from the Championship. The points totals are reset to 0 and each team plays 7 games each, playing every other team once. After 7 games each the teams finishing 1st, 2nd, and 3rd will gain qualification to the 2016 Super League season. The teams finishing 4th and 5th will play in the "Million Pound Game" at the home of the 4th place team which will earn the winner a place in the 2016 Super League; the loser, along with teams finishing 6th, 7th and 8th, will be relegated to the Championship.

=== Round 1 ===
Home	Score	Away	Match Information
Home	Score	Away	Venue	Attendance
Bradford Bulls	42–10	Sheffield Eagles	Odsal Stadium	6,032
Halifax	0–14	Widnes Vikings	The Shay	3,022
Leigh Centurions	26– 36	Hull Kingston Rovers	Leigh Sports Village	4,459
Salford Red Devils	34– 26	Wakefield Trinity Wildcats	AJ Bell Stadium	3,490

=== Round 2 ===
Home	Score	Away	Match Information
Home	Score	Away	Venue	Attendance
Salford Red Devils	46–18	Leigh Centurions	AJ Bell Stadium	4,547
Wakefield Trinity Wildcats	48–18	Bradford Bulls	Belle Vue	3,985
Widnes Vikings	48–12	Sheffield Eagles	Stobart Stadium	4,567
Hull Kingston Rovers	34–12	Halifax	Craven Park	6,837

=== Round 3 ===
Home	Score	Away	Match Information
Home	Score	Away	Venue	Attendance
Widnes Vikings	8–12	Hull Kingston Rovers	Stobart Stadium	5,461
Leigh Centurions	16– 17	Wakefield Trinity Wildcats	Leigh Sports Village	4,376
Bradford Bulls	41–10	Salford Red Devils	Odsal Stadium	6,593
Sheffield Eagles	28– 24	Halifax	Keepmoat Stadium	854

=== Round 4 ===
Home	Score	Away	Match Information
Home	Score	Away	Venue	Attendance
Hull Kingston Rovers	20– 18	Wakefield Trinity Wildcats	Craven Park	7,495
Bradford Bulls	12–56	Widnes Vikings	Odsal Stadium	6,881
Halifax	28– 50	Salford Red Devils	The Shay	2,186
Leigh Centurions	52– 16	Sheffield Eagles	Leigh Sports Village	4,021

=== Round 5 ===
Home	Score	Away	Match Information
Home	Score	Away	Venue	Attendance
Hull Kingston Rovers	48–4	Bradford Bulls	Craven Park	6,605
Wakefield Trinity Wildcats	4–46	Widnes Vikings	Belle Vue	3,365
Salford Red Devils	53–34	Sheffield Eagles	AJ Bell Stadium	3,000
Halifax	34–12	Leigh Centurions	The Shay	3,010

=== Round 6 ===
Home	Score	Away	Match Information
Home	Score	Away	Venue	Attendance
Wakefield Trinity Wildcats	30– 12	Halifax	Belle Vue	3,086
Leigh Centurions	16–32	Bradford Bulls	Leigh Sports Village	4,621
Sheffield Eagles	28– 38	Hull Kingston Rovers	Bramall Lane	2,017
Widnes Vikings	10 –24	Salford Red Devils	Stobart Stadium	3,876

=== Round 7 ===
Home	Score	Away	Match Information
Home	Score	Away	Venue	Attendance
Bradford Bulls	18–52	Halifax	Odsal Stadium	5,163
Hull Kingston Rovers	46–22	Salford Red Devils	Craven Park	7,543
Sheffield Eagles	24–10	Wakefield Trinity Wildcats	Bramall Lane	1,712
Widnes Vikings	50– 6	Leigh Centurions	Stobart Stadium	5,550

=== Standings ===
Pos	Team	Pld	W	D	L	PF	PA	PD	Pts	Qualification
1	Hull Kingston Rovers	7	7	0	0	234	118	+116	14	2016 Super League
2	Widnes Vikings	7	5	0	2	232	70	+162	10	2016 Super League
3	Salford Red Devils	7	5	0	2	239	203	+36	10	2016 Super League
4	Wakefield Trinity Wildcats (W)	7	3	0	4	153	170	−17	6	Million Pound Game
5	Bradford Bulls	7	3	0	4	167	240	−73	6	Million Pound Game
6	Halifax	7	2	0	5	162	186	−24	4	2016 Championship
7	Sheffield Eagles	7	2	0	5	152	267	−115	4	2016 Championship
8	Leigh Centurions	7	1	0	6	146	231	−85	2	2016 Championship

Source: Rugby League Project
Rules for classification: 1) Points; 2) Points difference; 3) Number of points scored;
(W) Million Pound Game Winner

=== Million Pound Game ===
#	Home	Score	Away	Match Information
#	Home	Score	Away	Date and Time (Local)	Venue	Attendance
Million Pound Game
F	Wakefield Trinity Wildcats	24 – 16	Bradford Bulls	3 October, 14:50 BST	Belle Vue	7,236

== Championship Shield ==
The third of the three "Super 8" groups sees teams finishing 5th to 12th in the regular Championship table. Like the Super League 8s, these teams retain their original points and play 7 extra games, with the teams finishing in the top 4 places after these extra games contesting play-offs similar to Super League, with 1st v 4th and 2nd vs 3rd, with the winners contesting the Championship Shield Grand Final.

The two teams finishing at the bottom of this Super 8s group (7th and 8th) will be relegated to League One and be replaced by two promoted sides.

Pos	Club	P	W	D	L	For	Agst	Pts	Qualification
1	Featherstone Rovers	30	19	0	11	809	701	38	Playoff Place
2	Dewsbury Rams	30	17	1	12	686	624	35	Playoff Place
3	London Broncos	30	15	0	15	756	674	30	Playoff Place
4	Workington Town	30	11	1	18	587	782	23	Playoff Place
5	Batley Bulldogs	30	10	0	20	645	707	20	Season Complete
6	Whitehaven	30	10	0	20	618	921	20	Season Complete
7	Hunslet Hawks	30	8	0	22	518	957	16	Relegation to 2016 League 1
8	Doncaster	30	2	0	28	401	1128	4	Relegation to 2016 League 1
