= Million Pound Game =

Rugby league game

- Sport: Rugby league
- Instituted: 2015
- Number of teams: 2
- Country: England (RFL); Canada; France
- Most titles: four-way tie (1 title)
- Broadcast partner: Sky Sports; BBC Sport (Highlights)

Million Pound Game (stylized as £1M Game) was an annual rugby league game that decides which Championship teams will be promoted to Super League, and which Super League teams would be relegated for the following season. Instituted in 2015 and played until 2018, the game was played as the final of The Qualifiers replacing the playoffs and Championship Grand Final.

In 2019, the Championship Grand Final returned but used the "Million Pound Game" name until 2021.

The name alludes to the higher level of funding Super League clubs receive.

== Format ==
=== 2015–2018: The Qualifiers ===
Starting for the 2015 season, the bottom 4 teams in the Super League played the top four teams in the Championship in a league of eight. The top three teams were awarded a place in Super League whilst teams finishing fourth and fifth play each other for the final Super League place in a game called the Million Pound Game.

=== 2019–2021: Playoffs ===
The 2019 season saw return of the playoffs and the Championship Grand Final to determine promotion to the Super League and, with the Super 8s being scrapped, the winners of the RFL Championship. The name "Millions Pound Game" was retained for the final due to marketing purposes until 2021, with the 2022 final being called the "Championship Grand Final" again.

== Results ==
Year	Winner	Score	Runner up	Venue	Attendance	Ref.
2015	Wakefield Trinity	24–16	Bradford Bulls	Belle Vue	7,236	
2016	Salford Red Devils	19–18	Hull Kingston Rovers	Craven Park	6,562	
2017	Catalans Dragons	26–10	Leigh Centurions	Leigh Sports Village	6,888	
2018	London Broncos	4–2	Toronto Wolfpack	Lamport Stadium	9,246	

=== Winners ===
Club	Wins	Last win	Runners-up	Last final lost
Wakefield Trinity	1	2015	0	N/A
Salford Red Devils	1	2016	0	N/A
Catalans Dragons	1	2017	0	N/A
London Broncos	1	2018	0	N/A
Bradford Bulls	0	N/A	1	2015
Hull Kingston Rovers	0	N/A	1	2016
Toronto Wolfpack	0	N/A	1	2018
Leigh Centurions	0	N/A	1	2017

== See also ==
- Championship Grand Final
- League 1 Promotion Final
- Championship Leaders' Shield
