= Rugby League Super 8s =

British rugby competition

- Current season or competition: 2018 Super 8s
- Sport: Rugby league
- Instituted: 2015
- Ceased: 2018
- Number of teams: 39
- Country: England; Wales; France; Canada (RFL)
- Holders: Super League; Leeds Rhinos; Qualifiers; Warrington Wolves; Championship Shield; Toulouse Olympique
- Broadcast partner: Sky Sports; BBC Sport (Highlights)

The Rugby League Super 8s are a feature of the British rugby league system. Between 2015 and 2018 they were played in the top three professional divisions. Following the completion of the regular season home-and-away fixtures in the Super League, the Championship and League One, teams split into smaller divisions of eight based on their finishing positions on the league table; the teams then played an additional fixture against each of the seven other teams in their division to determine the final standings.

The Super 8s were scheduled to return from the 2025 season and determine promotion and relegation between the Championship and League One. However, in August 2025 the Rugby Football League decided to merge the Championship and League One from 2026 and the Super 8s were therefore no longer needed.

== Regular season ==
=== Super League ===
The Super League season sees teams play each other home and away, and one team for a third time at the Magic Weekend. After 23 games, the league table is frozen and the teams are split up into "Super 8s". Teams finishing in the top 8 will play 7 more games each as they compete in the Super League Super 8 group for a place in the Grand Final. Teams finishing in the bottom four will join the top 4 teams from the Championship in The Qualifiers Super 8 group and also play 7 more games each for a place in the next years Super League competition.

Position	Qualification
1	Super League Super 8s
2	Super League Super 8s
3	Super League Super 8s
4	Super League Super 8s
5	Super League Super 8s
6	Super League Super 8s
7	Super League Super 8s
8	Super League Super 8s
9	The Qualifiers
10	The Qualifiers
11	The Qualifiers
12	The Qualifiers

=== Championship ===
The Championship season sees teams play each other home and away, and one team for a third time at The Summer Bash. After 23 games, the league table is frozen and the teams are split up into "Super 8s". Teams finishing in the top 4 will play 7 more games each as they compete in the Qualifiers to try and earn a place in next seasons Super League. Teams finishing in the bottom 8 compete in the Championship Shield Super 8 group and also play 7 more games each.

Position	Qualification
1	The Qualifiers
2	The Qualifiers
3	The Qualifiers
4	The Qualifiers
5	Championship Shield
6	Championship Shield
7	Championship Shield
8	Championship Shield
9	Championship Shield
10	Championship Shield
11	Championship Shield
12	Championship Shield

== Super League Super 8s ==
After 23 games the league table is frozen and the teams are split up into 2 of the 3 "Super 8s". Teams finishing in the top 8 go on to play 7 more games each, to compete for a place in the play-offs, and all retain a place in Super League for the next season. Teams finishing in the bottom four (9-12) will compete alongside the top 4 teams from the Championship, in "The Qualifiers" Super 8 group. These teams will reset their season standings and also play 7 extra games each, as they attempt to earn a place in the following year's Super League competition.

=== Super League ===
Position	Qualification
1	League Leaders/ Play-off Place
2	Play-off Place
3	Play-off Place
4	Play-off Place
5	Season Complete
6	Season Complete
7	Season Complete
8	Season Complete

==== Play-Offs ====
- 1st vs 4th
- 2nd vs 3rd

==== Grand final ====
Stadium	Location	Country	Highest attendance	Average attendance
Old Trafford	Trafford, Greater Manchester	England	73,581	63,352

== The Qualifiers ==
The Qualifiers Super 8s sees the bottom 4 teams from Super League table join the top 4 teams from the Championship. The points totals are reset to 0 and each team plays 7 games each, playing every other team once. After 7 games each the teams finishing 1st, 2nd, and 3rd will gain qualification to the next years Super League season. The teams finishing 4th and 5th will play in the "Million Pound Game" at the home of the 4th place team which will earn the winner a place in the next years Super League; the loser, along with teams finishing 6th, 7th and 8th, will be relegated to the Championship.

Position	Qualification
1	Super League Place
2	Super League Place
3	Super League Place
4	Million Pound Game
5	Million Pound Game
6	Championship Place
7	Championship Place
8	Championship Place

=== Results ===
Year	Super League Place	Championship Place
2015	Hull Kingston Rovers; Widnes Vikings; Salford Red Devils; Wakefield Trinity	Bradford Bulls; Sheffield Eagles; Halifax; Leigh Centurions
2016	Leeds Rhinos; Leigh Centurions; Huddersfield Giants; Salford Red Devils	Hull Kingston Rovers; London Broncos; Batley Bulldogs; Featherstone Rovers
2017	Warrington Wolves; Hull Kingston Rovers; Widnes Vikings; Catalans Dragons	London Broncos; Featherstone Rovers; Halifax; Leigh Centurions
2018	Leeds Rhinos; Hull Kingston Rovers; Salford Red Devils; London Broncos	Toronto Wolfpack; Toulouse Olympique; Widnes Vikings; Halifax

- Bold Promoted/ Relegated

=== Million Pound Game ===
The Million Pound Game is a promotion play-off in the Qualifiers between the teams finishing 4th and 5th. The game is played at the ground of the team finishing 4th and the winner earns a place in the next season's Super League while the loser plays the next season in the Championship.

=== Winners ===
	Winners	Count	Years
1	Hull Kingston Rovers	1	2015
2	Leeds Rhinos	1	2016
3	Warrington Wolves	1	2017
4	Salford Red Devils	1	2018

== Championship Shield ==
The third of the three "Super 8" groups sees teams finishing 5th to 12th in the regular Championship table. Like the Super League 8s, these teams retain their original points and play 7 extra games, with the teams finishing in the top 4 places after these extra games contesting play-offs similar to Super League, with 1st v 4th and 2nd vs 3rd, with the winners contesting the Championship Shield Grand Final.

The two teams finishing at the bottom of this Super 8s group (7th and 8th) will be relegated to League One and be replaced by two promoted sides.

Position	Qualification
1	Play-off Place
2	Play-off Place
3	Play-off Place
4	Play-off Place
5	Season Complete
6	Season Complete
7	Relegated
8	Relegated

=== Winners ===
Year	Winner	Score	Runner up	Venue	Attendance
2015	Featherstone Rovers	36–4	London Broncos	Halton Stadium	4,179
2016	Bradford Bulls	27–16	Sheffield Eagles	Odsal Stadium	3,518
2017	Toulouse	44–14	Sheffield Eagles	Stade Ernest-Argelès	
2018	Featherstone Rovers	42–10	Leigh Centurions	Post Office Road	

== See also ==
- Super League
- Championship (rugby league)
- League 1 (rugby league)
