= 2019 Wigan Warriors season =

Rugby league season

Wigan Warriors 2019 season
- Super League XXIV Rank: 2nd
- Play-off result: Eliminated in Preliminary Final
- Challenge Cup: 6th Round
- 2019 record: Wins: 18; draws: 0; losses: 12
- Points scored: For: 699; against: 539

Team information
- Chairman: Ian Lenagan
- Head Coach: Adrian Lam
- Captain: Sean O'Loughlin
- Stadium: DW Stadium

Top scorers
- Tries: Liam Marshall (17)
- Points: Zak Hardaker (243)
| Home colours | Away colours |
| ← 2018 | List of seasons | 2020 → |

The 2019 season saw the Wigan Warriors compete in the Super League, Grand Final Playoffs, Challenge Cup, and the World Club Challenge.

== Pre-season friendlies ==
| Date | Opponent | H/A | Result | Scorers | Att. | Ref. |
|---|---|---|---|---|---|---|
| 18 January 2019 | London Skolars | A | 34–6 | | | |
| 20 January 2019 | Salford Red Devils | A | 28–18 | | | |
| 26 January 2019 | Barrow Raiders | A | 18–18 | | | |

== World Club Challenge ==
Winners of the 2018 Super League Grand Final, Wigan Warriors qualified to play 2018 NRL champions Sydney Roosters in the 2019 World Club Challenge. Wigan were beaten by the Australian side, retaining the title for the NRL.

| Date | Opponent | H/A | Result | Scorers | Att. |
|---|---|---|---|---|---|
| 17 February 2019 | Sydney Roosters | H | 8–20 | | 21,331 |

== Super League ==
=== Matches ===
Wigan's form was split through the season. The previous year's Grand Final champions start the season in poor form winning only once in their first six games. Form improved towards the middle of the season, before a surge of good results towards the end of the season – losing only once in the last three months. Wigan finished second in the league for the second year in a row.

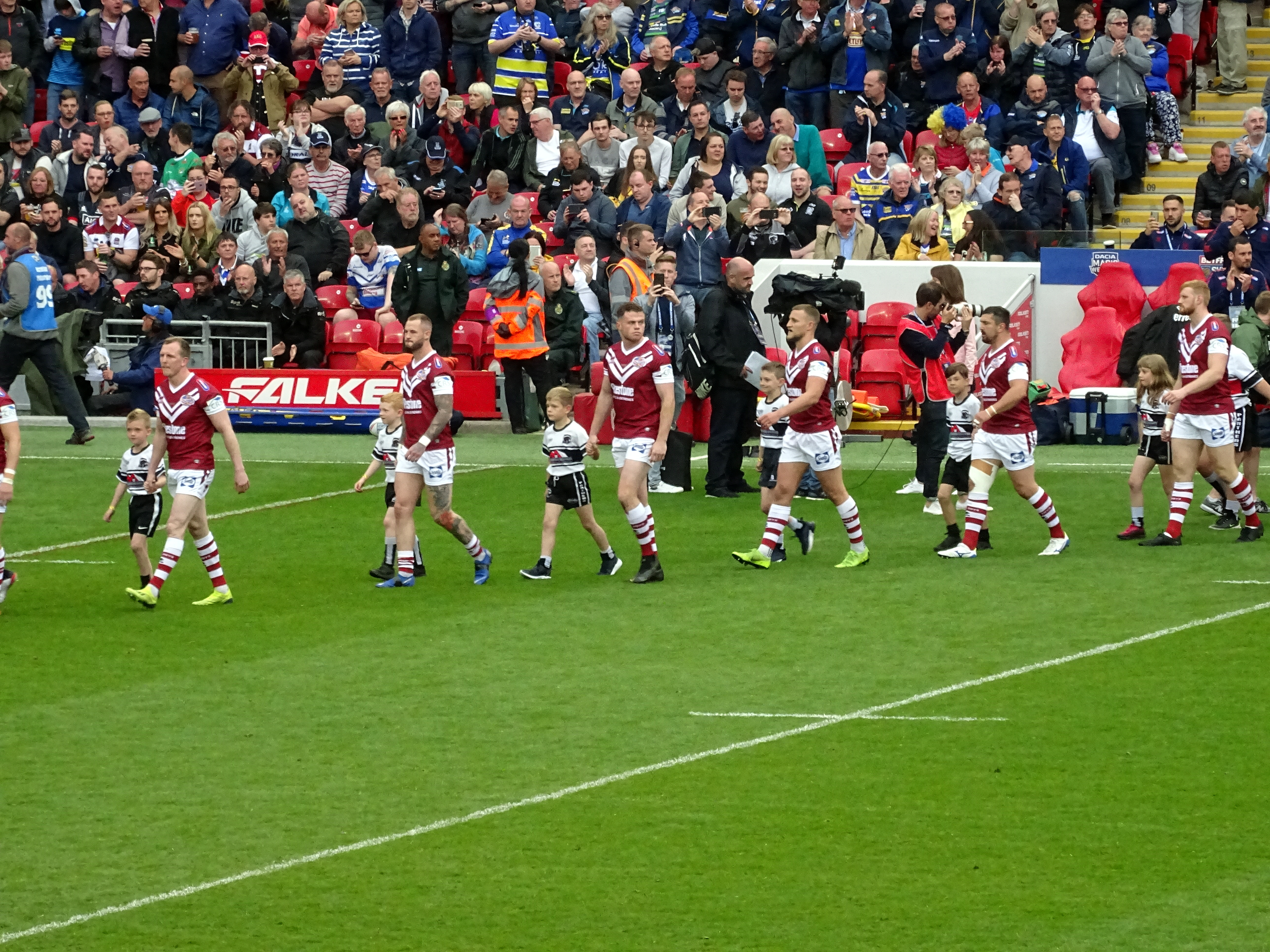
Wigan entering the field at Anfield during Magic Weekend 2019.

| Date | Opponent | H/A | Result | Scorers | Att. | Pos. |
|---|---|---|---|---|---|---|
| 31 January 2019 | St Helens | A | 22–12 | | 16,508 | |
| 8 February 2019 | Leeds Rhinos | H | 34–16 | | 11,230 | |
| 24 February 2019 | Hull F.C. | H | 22–23 | | 10,971 | |
| 3 March 2019 | London Broncos | A | 18–16 | | 2,586 | |
| 8 March 2019 | Huddersfield Giants | H | 6–14 | | 10,114 | |
| 15 March 2019 | Warrington Wolves | A | 12–25 | | 13,106 | |
| 24 March 2019 | Salford Red Devils | A | 30–22 | | 4,770 | |
| 31 March 2019 | Catalans Dragons | H | 42–0 | | 11,106 | |
| 5 April 2019 | Castleford Tigers | A | 28–38 | | 6,830 | |
| 12 April 2019 | Wakefield Trinity | A | 20–30 | | 5,694 | |
| 19 April 2019 | St Helens | H | 10–36 | | 22,050 | |
| 22 April 2019 | Salford Red Devils | A | 30–26 | | 4,017 | |
| 27 April 2019 | Castleford Tigers | H | 6–4 | | 10,058 | |
| 2 May 2019 | London Broncos | H | 18–8 | | 9,907 | |
| 18 May 2019 | Catalans Dragons | N | 16–33 | | 31,555 | |
| 25 May 2019 | Warrington Wolves | N | 14–26 | | 30,057 | |
| 8 June 2019 | Hull KR | A | 19–18 | | 8,010 | |
| 14 June 2019 | Leeds Rhinos | A | 23–14 | | 13,105 | |
| 21 June 2019 | Huddersfield Giants | A | 38–22 | | 5,578 | |
| 28 June 2019 | Salford Red Devils | H | 28–12 | | 12,066 | |
| 5 July 2019 | Hull KR | H | 52–10 | | 11,042 | |
| 12 July 2019 | St Helens | A | 10–32 | | 17,088 | |
| 18 July 2019 | Wakefield Trinity | H | 46–16 | | 10,203 | |
| 1 August 2019 | Hull F.C. | A | 15–14 | | 10,153 | |
| 9 August 2019 | Hull KR | H | 36–18 | | 10,702 | |
| 18 August 2019 | Warrington Wolves | H | 20–6 | | 12,555 | |
| 1 September 2019 | Wakefield Trinity | A | 24–16 | | 5,805 | |
| 6 September 2019 | Catalans Dragons | H | 46–12 | | 10,804 | |
| 12 September 2019 | Castleford Tigers | H | 26–8 | | 11,001 | |

=== League table ===
| Pos | Team | Pld | W | D | L | PF | PA | PD | Pts | Qualification |
|---|---|---|---|---|---|---|---|---|---|---|
| 1 | St. Helens (C, L) | 29 | 26 | 0 | 3 | 916 | 395 | +521 | 52 | Semi Final |
| 2 | Wigan Warriors | 29 | 18 | 0 | 11 | 699 | 539 | +160 | 36 | Qualifying Final |
| 3 | Salford Red Devils | 29 | 17 | 0 | 12 | 783 | 597 | +186 | 34 | Qualifying Final |
| 4 | Warrington Wolves | 29 | 16 | 0 | 13 | 709 | 533 | +176 | 32 | Elimination Final |
| 5 | Castleford Tigers | 29 | 15 | 0 | 14 | 646 | 558 | +88 | 30 | Elimination Final |
| 6 | Hull F.C. | 29 | 15 | 0 | 14 | 645 | 768 | −123 | 30 | |
| 7 | Catalans Dragons | 29 | 13 | 0 | 16 | 553 | 745 | −192 | 26 | |
| 8 | Leeds Rhinos | 29 | 12 | 0 | 17 | 650 | 644 | +6 | 24 | |
| 9 | Wakefield Trinity | 29 | 11 | 0 | 18 | 608 | 723 | −115 | 22 | |
| 10 | Huddersfield Giants | 29 | 11 | 0 | 18 | 571 | 776 | −205 | 22 | |
| 11 | Hull KR | 29 | 10 | 0 | 19 | 548 | 768 | −220 | 20 | |
| 12 | London Broncos (R) | 29 | 10 | 0 | 19 | 505 | 787 | −282 | 20 | Relegated to Championship |

(C) Champions; (L) League Leaders' Shield Winners; (R) Relegated

=== Grand Final Playoffs ===
Finishing second in the league, Wigan qualified for the Grand Final Play-offs. The Warriors won the qualifying final, but lost in the semifinal and the preliminary final to finish third in the play-off series.

| Date | Match | Opponent | H/A | Result | Scorers | Att. |
|---|---|---|---|---|---|---|
| 20 September 2019 | Qualifying Final | Salford Red Devils | H | 18–12 | | 9,247 |
| 27 September 2019 | Semi-final 1 | St Helens | A | 10–40 | | 14,508 |
| 4 October 2019 | Preliminary Final | Salford Red Devils | H | 4–28 | | 9,858 |

== Challenge Cup ==
As a "Super 8s" team of the 2018 Super League, Wigan Warriors entered the 2019 Challenge Cup in the sixth round where they were subsequently knocked out by Warrington Wolves.

| Date | Round | Opponent | H/A | Result | Scorers | Att. |
|---|---|---|---|---|---|---|
| 12 May 2019 | Sixth Round | Warrington Wolves | A | 24–26 | | 7,086 |

== Transfers ==
=== In ===
| Player | From | Contract | Date | Ref. |
|---|---|---|---|---|
| (England) Joe Bullock | Barrow Raiders | 3 Years | June 2018 (Note: Whist signing For Wigan Warriors in the middle of the 2018 season, Bullock did not start playing for the club until the 2019 season.) | |
| (England) Zak Hardaker | Free Agent (Note: Most recently played for Castleford Tigers.) | 4 Years | June 2018 (Note: Whist signing For Wigan Warriors in the middle of the 2018 season, Hardaker did not start playing for the club until the 2019 season.) | |
| (Malta) Jarrod Sammut | London Broncos | 2 Years | November 2018 | |
| (Australia) Bevan French | Wentworthville Magpies | 2 Years | July 2019 | |

=== Out ===
| Player | To | Contract | Date | Ref. |
|---|---|---|---|---|
| (England) Sam Tomkins | Catalan Dragons | 3 Years | July 2018 | |
| (England) John Bateman | Canberra Raiders | Undisclosed | August 2018 | |
| (England) Ryan Sutton | Canberra Raiders | 2 Years | August 2018 | |
| (England) Joe Bretherton | Toulouse Olympique | Undisclosed | September 2018 | |
| (Ireland) Declan O'Donnell | Leigh Centurions | Undisclosed | November 2018 | |
| (Ireland) Jack Higginson | Leigh Centurions | Undisclosed | November 2018 | |
| (England) Lewis Heckford | Dewsbury Rams | 1 Year | December 2018 | |
| (England) Josh Ganson | Released | —N/a | May 2019 | |
| (England) Liam Forsyth | Leigh Centurions | Undisclosed | June 2019 | |
| (Australia) Taulima Tautai | Released | —N/a | June 2019 | |

=== Loans Out ===
| Player | To | Contract | Date | Ref. |
|---|---|---|---|---|
| (England) Josh Woods | Leigh Centurions | 1 Year | December 2018 | |
| (England) Caine Barnes | Workington Town | 1 Year | December 2018 | |
| (England) Harry Smith | Swinton Lions | 1 Month | May 2018 | |

== Squad ==
2019 Wigan Warriors Squad
| First team squad | | | Coaching staff |
|---|---|---|---|
| (France) 1 Morgan Escare – FB; (England) 2 Tom Davies – WG; (England) 3 Dan Sarginson – CE, FB, WG; (England) 4 Oliver Gildart – CE; (England) 5 Joe Burgess – WG, CE; (England) 6 George Williams – SO, SH, HK; (New Zealand) 7 Thomas Leuluai – HK, HB, SO; (England) 8 Tony Clubb – PR, LF, CE, SR, WG; (England) 9 Sam Powell – HB, HK; (Wales) 10 Ben Flower – PR, LF; (England) 11 Joe Greenwood – SR; (England) 12 Liam Farrell – SR, LF; (England) 13 Sean O'Loughlin (c) – LF, SO | (France) 14 Romain Navarette – PR; (Samoa) 15 Willie Isa – LF, SR, CE, WG; (Australia) 16 Gabriel Hamlin – LF, PR; (England) 17 Liam Marshall – WG; (England) 20 Zak Hardaker – FB, CE, WG; (England) 21 Dominic Manfredi – WG; (England) 22 Joe Bullock – PR; (England) 23 Chris Hankinson – CE; (England) 24 Oliver Partington – PR; (England) 25 Craig Mullen – FB, WG; (England) 26 Josh Woods – SO, SH | (England) 27 Jake Shorrocks – SH; (England) 28 Jack Wells – SR; (England) 29 Liam Paisley – SR; (England) 31 Liam Forsyth – CE, WG; (Democratic Republic of the Congo) 32 Samuel Kibula – PR, LF; (England) 33 Callum Field – SR, CE; (England) 34 Caine Barnes – SO, SH; (England) 35 James Worthington – CE, FB; (Ireland) 36 Liam Byrne – PR; (Malta) 37 Jarrod Sammut – SH, SO, FB, HK | Head coach: (Papua New Guinea) Adrian Lam; Assistant coaches: (England) Paul Deacon; (England) Kris Radlinski; Legend: (c) Captain(s); (vc) Vice-captain(s); Updated: 22 November 2018; Source(s): 2019 Squad Numbers |
