= 2020 Wigan Warriors season =

English rugby league season

Wigan Warriors 2020 season
- Super League XXV Rank: 1st
- Play-off result: Runners-up
- Challenge Cup: Semi-finals
- 2020 record: Wins: 15; draws: 0; losses: 6
- Points scored: For: 489; against: 318 (Note: Does not include expunged win against Toronto Wolfpack)

Team information
- Chairman: Ian Lenagan
- Head Coach: Adrian Lam
- Captain: Sean O'Loughlin
- Stadium: DW Stadium
- Avg. attendance: 12,222
- Agg. attendance: 48,889
- High attendance: 15,040
- Low attendance: 10,333

Top scorers
- Tries: Bevan French (17)
- Goals: Zak Hardaker (72)
- Points: Zak Hardaker (164)
Home colours	Away colours
← 2019	List of seasons	2021 →

The 2020 season was the Wigan Warriors's 40th consecutive season playing in England's top division of rugby league. During the season, they competed in the Super League XXV and the 2020 Challenge Cup.

== Preseason friendlies ==
The 2020 pre-season saw three matches played including a testimonial, against Leeds Rhinos, for academy graduate Liam Farrell who has been playing for the first team since the 2010 season. The first match against the London Skolars was a continuation of an annual event between the Warriors and Skolars, resulting in a 70–6 win by the away side. The second match against the Leeds Rhinos resulted in a 10–22 loss for Wigan. The final match against derby rivals Leigh Centurions, ended in a 6–12 loss for the Warriors.

Date	Opponent	H/A	Result	Scorers	Att.	Ref.
17 January 2020	London Skolars	A	70–6			
19 January 2020	Leeds Rhinos	H	10–22			
23 January 2020	Leigh Centurions	A	6–12			

== Super League ==
=== Regular season ===
==== Matches ====
Win Draw Loss Postponed/Cancelled/Expunged

Date and time	MW	Versus	H/A	Venue	Result	Score	Tries	Goals	Attendance	Position	TV	Report
30 January, 19:45	1	Warrington Wolves	H	DW Stadium	W	16–10	French, Powell, Marshall	Hardaker (2)	15,040	6th	Sky Sports	
7 February, 19:45	2	Castleford Tigers	A	The Mend-A-Hose Jungle	L	12–16	Byrne, Burgess	Hardaker (2)	8,848	7th	Not Aired	
13 February, 19:45	3	Toronto Wolfpack	H	DW Stadium	W	32–10	Smith, French (2), Burgess, Farrell (2)	Hardaker (4)	10,333	2nd	Sky Sports	(Note: Following Toronto Wolfpack's decision to withdraw from the 2020 Super League due to the COVID-19 pandemic, all previous results involving Toronto Wolfpack would be expunged from the 2020 season record.)
23 February, 19:45	4	Hull FC	H	DW Stadium	W	26–12	French, Manfredi, Hastings, Isa	Hardaker (5)	12,005	2nd	Not Aired	
1 March, 15:00	5	Huddersfield Giants	A	John Smiths Stadium	W	42–10	Isa, Marshall (3), Powell, Manfredi, Partington, Burgess	Hardaker (5)	6,574	1st	Not Aired	
8 March, 15:00	6	Hull KR	H	DW Stadium	W	30–16	Hastings (2), Farrell, Powell, Marshall	Hardaker (5)	11,511	1st	Not Aired	
13 March, 19:45	7	Salford Red Devils	A	AJ Bell Stadium	L	14–18	Hastings, Powell	Hankinson (3)	4,796	1st	Sky Sports	
22 March, 15:00	8	Catalans Dragons	H	DW Stadium	Postponed due to the COVID-19 pandemic: On 16 March the Super League and RFL announced the suspension of all games until 3 April.							
27 March, 19:45	9	Wakefield Trinity	A	The Mobile Rocket Stadium	Postponed due to the COVID-19 pandemic: On 16 March the Super League and RFL announced the suspension of all games until 3 April.							
Indefinite suspension of the Super League announced on 24 March due to the COVID-19 pandemic.
On 26 June the RFL announced the Super League would return on 2 August.
9 August, 15:15	8	Wakefield Trinity	N	Headingley Stadium	W	23–22	Hardaker, French, Marshall, Bibby	Hardaker (3); Drop-goals: Smith	Played behind closed doors due to the COVID-19 pandemic.	1st	Sky Sports	
16 August, 18:30	9	Leeds Rhinos	N	Totally Wicked Stadium	W	28–10	Farrell, Manfredi, French (2), Bibby	Hardaker (4)	Played behind closed doors due to the COVID-19 pandemic.	1st	Sky Sports	
29 August, 16:15	10	Catalans Dragons	N	Halliwell Jones Stadium	Postponed due to two Catalans Dragons players testing positive for COVID-19. Wigan's schedule was changed to play their round 18 tie against Castleford Tigers instead, who had been freed up in round 10 due to Toronto Wolfpack's earlier exit from the competition. NB: This match was set to be aired on Sky Sports.							
29 August, 16:15	18	Castleford Tigers	N	Halliwell Jones Stadium	W	30–22	Powell, Burgess, Farrell, Bullock, Flower	Hardaker (5)	Played behind closed doors due to the COVID-19 pandemic.	1st	Sky Sports	
3 September, 18:00	11	Hull KR	N	Headingley Stadium	L	18–34	Powell, Hastings, Smith	Hardaker (3)	Played behind closed doors due to the COVID-19 pandemic.	3rd >> 4th (Note: Due to the number of games being postponed and the limited opportunities to reschedule the Super League changed the format of the table so positions would be based on win percentage thus allowing for an even competition if teams don't play all 20 matches.)	Sky Sports	
12 September, 17:00	12	Catalans Dragons	A	Stade Gilbert Brutus	W	28–18	Gildart, French, Burgess (2), Powell	Hardaker (4)	5,000 (Note: Due to the difference in regulations regarding the COVID-19 pandemic in France, a capped attendance of 5,000 was permitted for the game.)	3rd	Sky Sports	
25 September, 20:15	13	Wakefield Trinity	N	Halliwell Jones Stadium	W	28–16	Hastings, French (2), Powell, Gildart	Hardaker (4)	Played behind closed doors due to the COVID-19 pandemic.	3rd	Sky Sports	
29 September, 19:45	14	St Helens	N	AJ Bell Stadium	L	0–42			Played behind closed doors due to the COVID-19 pandemic.	4th	Sky Sports	
9 October, 19:45	15	Warrington Wolves	N	Headingley Stadium	W	18–14	Greenwood, Hardaker, Farrell	Hardaker (3)	Played behind closed doors due to the COVID-19 pandemic.	2nd	Sky Sports	
14 October	16	Toronto Wolfpack	A	Lamport Stadium	Fixture cancelled following Toronto Wolfpack withdrawal from the Super League 2020.							
15 October, 17:30	10	Catalans Dragons	N	Halliwell Jones Stadium	Postponed due to several Wigan Warriors players testing positive for COVID-19. The match was later cancelled as a revised date was unable to be arranged. NB: This match was set to be aired on Sky Sports.							
23 October, 17:30	17	Salford Red Devils	N	Totally Wicked Stadium	W	58–12	Powell (2), Farrell (2), French (3), Hastings, Gildart (2)	Hardaker (9)	Played behind closed doors due to the COVID-19 pandemic.	2nd	Sky Sports	
30 October, 19:45	19	St Helens	N	Totally Wicked Stadium	W	18–6	Bibby, Leuluai, French, Hastings	Hardaker	Played behind closed doors due to the COVID-19 pandemic.	1st	Sky Sports	
6 November, 19:45	20	Huddersfield Giants	N	Headingley Stadium	W	19–6	Powell, Hastings, Hardaker	Hardaker (3); Drop-goals: Hastings	Played behind closed doors due to the COVID-19 pandemic.	1st	Sky Sports	
8/9 November	21	Leeds Rhinos	Cancelled: Due to a significantly higher proportion of positive COVID-19 tests in the Hull KR squad, a decision was made to curtail the remainder of the season on 3 November. Select matches would still go ahead to enable all teams to have played a similar number of games.									
12/13 November	22	Hull F.C.	Cancelled: Due to a significantly higher proportion of positive COVID-19 tests in the Hull KR squad, a decision was made to curtail the remainder of the season on 3 November. Select matches would still go ahead to enable all teams to have played a similar number of games.									

==== League table ====
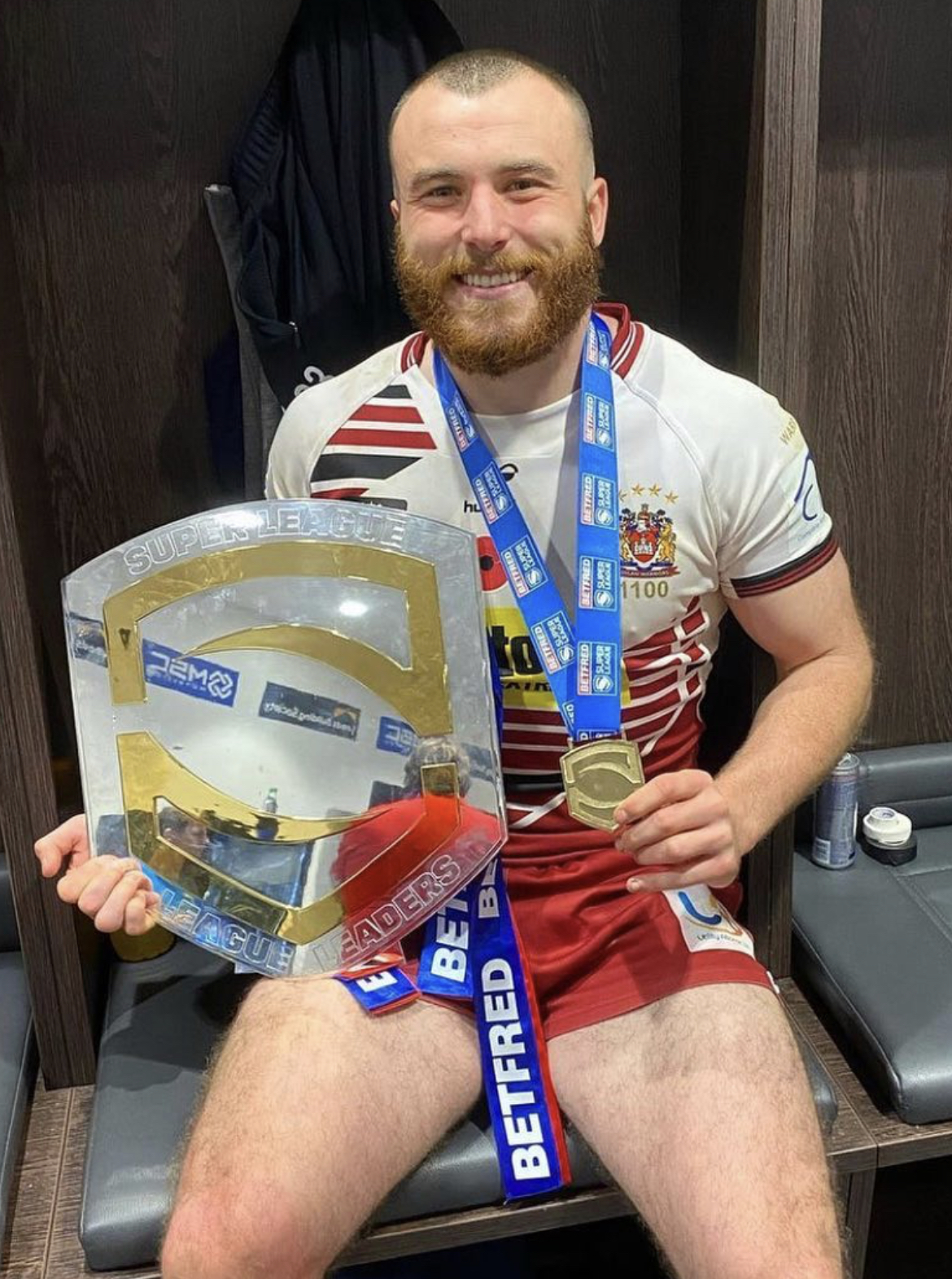
Wigan's New signing Jake Bibby celebrating winning the 2020 League Leaders' Shield

Pos	Team	Pld	W	D	L	PF	PA	PP	Pts	PCT	Qualification (Note: Where teams have the same win percentage, position is decided by points scored percentage (points scored divided by points conceded).)
1	Wigan Warriors (L)	17	13	0	4	408	278	146.8	26	76.47	Semi-finals
2	St Helens (C)	17	12	0	5	469	195	240.5	24	70.59	Semi-finals
3	Warrington Wolves (Note: Salford forfeited a game against Warrington. Under RFL operational rules, the game is recorded as a 24–0 victory for Warrington and converse loss for Salford with the points scored/conceded applying to both teams.)	17	12	0	5	365	204	178.9	24	70.59	Elimination semi-finals
4	Catalans Dragons	13	8	0	5	376	259	145.2	16	61.54	Elimination semi-finals
5	Leeds Rhinos	17	10	0	7	369	390	94.6	20	58.82	Elimination semi-finals
6	Hull F.C.	17	9	0	8	405	436	92.9	18	52.94	Elimination semi-finals
7	Huddersfield Giants (Note: Huddersfield were placed on standby to take the place of any of the four teams in the elimination finals should one be unable to fulfil their fixture.)	18	7	0	11	318	367	86.6	14	38.89	
8	Castleford Tigers	16	6	0	10	328	379	86.5	12	37.50	
9	Salford Red Devils	18	8	0	10	354	469	75.5	10 (Note: Salford deducted 3 wins by the Rugby Football League for failing to meet the terms of a financial commitment agreed in 2013.)	27.78	
10	Wakefield Trinity	19	5	0	14	324	503	64.4	10	26.32	
11	Hull Kingston Rovers	17	3	0	14	290	526	55.1	6	17.65	

Source: BBC Sport
Rules for classification: 1) Points; 2) Points difference; 3) Number of points scored;
(C) Champions; (L) League Leaders' Shield Winners

=== Play-offs ===
Win Draw Loss

- All fixtures are subject to change

Date and time	Round	Versus	H/A	Venue	Result	Score	Tries	Goals	Attendance	TV	Report
19 November, 19:45	Semi-final	Hull F.C.	H	DW Stadium	W	29–2	Burgess, Smith, Hardaker, Bibby, French	Hardaker (4); Drop-goals: Smith	Played behind closed doors due to the COVID-19 pandemic.	Sky Sports	
27 November, 20:00	Grand Final	St Helens	N	KCOM Stadium	L	4–8	Bibby		Played behind closed doors due to the COVID-19 pandemic.	Sky Sports	

== Challenge Cup ==
Win Draw Loss Postponed/Cancelled

- All fixtures are subject to change

Date and time	Round	Versus	H/A	Venue	Result	Score	Tries	Goals	Attendance	TV	Report
4/5 April	Sixth round	Warrington Wolves	H	DW Stadium	Postponed due to the COVID-19 pandemic: On 16 March the Super League and RFL announced the suspension of all games until 3 April.						
22 August, 14:30	Sixth round	Warrington Wolves	N	Kirklees Stadium	Cancelled: Due to the withdrawal of tier 2 and tier 3 clubs, and Toronto Wolfpack from the competition, all sixth round will be redrawn. Wigan was one of the six teams to receive a bye to the quarter-finals. NB: This match was set to be aired on BBC One.						
19 September, 17:00	Quarter-final	Hull F.C.	N	AJ Bell Stadium	W	36–4	Powell, Farrell (2), French (2), Burgess, Gildart	Hardaker (4)	Played behind closed doors due to the COVID-19 pandemic.	BBC Two	
3 October, 14:30	Semi-final	Leeds Rhinos	N	Totally Wicked Stadium	L	12–26	Smith, Hardaker	Hardaker (2)	Played behind closed doors due to the COVID-19 pandemic.	BBC One	

== Transfers ==
=== In ===
Player	From	Contract	Date	Ref.
(England) Jake Bibby	Salford Red Devils	3 Years	June 2019	
(England) George Burgess	South Sydney Rabbitohs	2 Years	June 2019	
(Māori people) Mitch Clark	Castleford Tigers	2 Years	June 2019	
(England) Jackson Hastings	Salford Red Devils	3 Years	July 2019	
(England) Kai Pearce-Paul	London Broncos	4 Years	November 2019	
(Ireland) Brad Singleton	Toronto Wolfpack	3 Years	September 2020	

=== Out ===
Player	To	Contract	Date	Ref.
(Democratic Republic of the Congo) Samy Kibula	Warrington Wolves	1 Year	September 2019	
(England) Caine Barnes	Workington Town	Undisclosed	September 2019	
(England) Dan Sarginson	Salford Red Devils	Undisclosed	October 2019	
(England) George Williams	Canberra Raiders	2 Years	October 2019	
(England) James Worthington	Oldham Roughyeds	1 Year	October 2019	
(England) Callum Field	Leigh Centurions	Undisclosed	November 2019	
(England) Tom Davies	Catalans Dragons	2 Years	November 2019	
(England) Sam Grant	Swinton Lions	1 Year	November 2019	
(England) Mikey Fitz	Cronulla Sharks	3 Years	November 2019	
(France) Morgan Escaré	Released (Note: Later joined Salford Red Devils)	—N/a	June 2020	

=== Loans Out ===
Player	To	Contract	Date	Ref.
(England) Josh Woods	Leigh Centurions	1 Year	December 2019	
(England) Craig Mullen	Leigh Centurions	1 Year	December 2019	

== Squad ==
2020 Wigan Warriors Squad
First team squad			Coaching staff
(England) 1 Zak Hardaker – FB, CE, WG (gk); (England) 2 Liam Marshall – WG; (England) 3 Chris Hankinson – CE; (England) 4 Oliver Gildart – CE; (England) 5 Joe Burgess – WG, CE; (Australia) 6 Bevan French – FB, WG; (New Zealand) 7 Thomas Leuluai – HK, HB, SO; (England) 8 Tony Clubb – PR, LF; (England) 9 Sam Powell – HB, HK; (England) 10 George Burgess – PR; (Samoa) 11 Willie Isa – SR, LK, CE; (England) 12 Liam Farrell – SR; (England) 13 Sean O'Loughlin (c) – LF	(Wales) 14 Ben Flower – PR, LF; (England) 15 Joe Greenwood – SR; (England) 16 Morgan Smithies – LK; (England) 17 Oliver Partington – PR; 18 Warriors Fans; (England) 19 Joe Bullock – PR; (Ireland) 20 Liam Byrne – PR; (England) 21 Dominic Manfredi – WG; (Māori people) 22 Mitch Clark – PR; (England) 23 Jake Bibby – WG; (France) 26 Romain Navarette – PR	(England) 27 Jake Shorrocks – SH; (England) 28 Harry Smith – SH; (England) 29 Jack Wells – SR; (Bulgaria) 30 Ethan Havard – PR; (England) 31 Jackson Hastings – SH, SO; (England) 32 Amir Bourouh – HK; (England) 33 Joe Shorrocks – SR, LF; (England) 34 Kai Pearce-Paul – SR, LF; (England) 35 Sam Halsall – CE; (England) / (Ireland) (Note: James McDonnell is currently undeclared for a national side and is eligible for either England or Ireland) 36 James McDonnell – SR; (England) 37 Harry Rushton – SR; (Ireland) 38 Brad Singleton – PR	Head coach: (Papua New Guinea) Adrian Lam; Assistant coaches: (England) John Winder; (England) Matty Peet; (England) Darrell Goulding; Legend: (c) Captain(s); (vc) Vice-captain(s); Injured; Updated: 15 November 2019; Source(s): 2020 Squad Numbers
