= 2018 Wigan Warriors season =

Wigan Warriors 2018 season
- Super League XXIII champions
- Super League XXIII Rank: 2nd
- Play-off result: Champions
- Challenge Cup: Quarter-finals
- 2018 record: Wins: 24; draws: 0; losses: 8
- Points scored: For: 740; against: 417

Team information
- Chairman: Ian Lenagan
- Head Coach: Shaun Wane
- Captain: Sean O'Loughlin
- Stadium: DW Stadium

Top scorers
- Tries: Liam Marshall (17)
- Points: Sam Tomkins (252)
Home colours
← 2017	List of seasons	2019 →

The Wigan Warriors play Rugby League in Wigan, England. Their 2018 season results in the Super League XXIII and the 2018 Challenge Cup are shown below.

== Preseason friendlies ==
Wigan had a pre-season tour in Australia ahead of hosting a Super League game at Wollongong Showground.

Date	Opponent	H/A	Result	Scorers	Att.
17 February 2018	South Sydney Rabbitohs	A	8–18		

== Super League ==
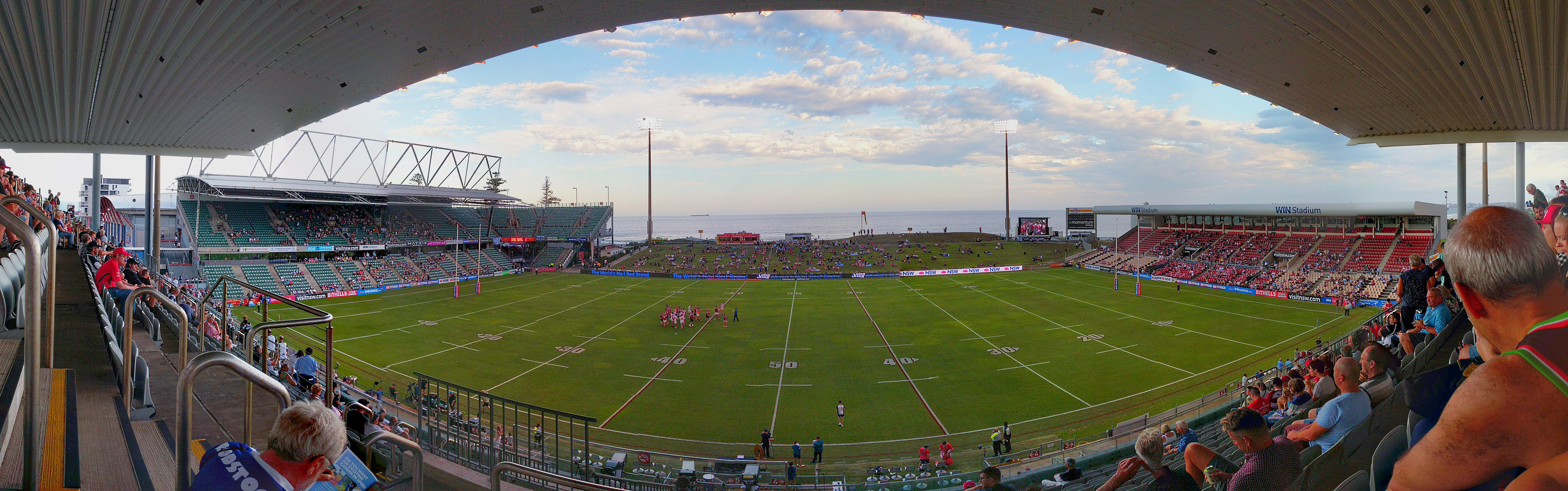
Before kick-off at the Wollongong Showground between Wigan and Hull F.C. - the first Super League game to be played in Australia

Wigan generally kept to consistent good form throughout the 2018 league season. They won all seven Super 8s games and sixteen out of twenty-three in the regular season. The Warriors went on to finish the season second.

=== Regular season ===
==== Matches ====
Date	Opponent	H/A	Result	Scorers	Att.	Pos.
2 February 2018	Salford Red Devils	A	40–12		5,568	
10 February 2018	Hull F.C.	N	24–10		12,416	
23 February 2018	Warrington Wolves	A	10–16		12,012	
2 March 2018	Widnes Vikings	H	32–16		10,815	
11 March 2018	Wakefield Trinity	H	30–18		11,455	
18 March 2018	Castleford Tigers	A	P–P	Postponed due to frozen pitch and heavy snowfall.		
23 March 2018	Huddersfield Giants	H	48–10		10,641	
30 March 2018	St Helens	A	18–21		17,980	
2 April 2018	Hull KR	H	44–6		10,977	
7 April 2018	Catalans Dragons	A	32–23		8,387	
13 April 2018	Leeds Rhinos	A	9–8		12,221	
20 April 2018	Castleford Tigers	H	28–12		11,866	
26 April 2018	Widnes Vikings	A	32–24		5,668	
4 May 2018	Salford Red Devils	H	30–0		10,733	
19 May 2018	Warrington Wolves	N	38–10		38,881	
25 May 2018	Hull KR	A	8–24		7,222	
7 June 2018	Wakefield Trinity	A	16–32		4,681	
16 June 2018	Hull F.C.	A	14–10		13,256	
22 June 2018 (Note: Originally scheduled for 18 March 2018)	Castleford Tigers	A	18–19		7,714	
28 June 2018	Leeds Rhinos	H	46–8		10,645	
6 July 2018	Warrington Wolves	H	13–12		13,249	
12 July 2018	Huddersfield Giants	A	20–12		5,264	
19 July 2018	St Helens	H	6–14		16,047	
27 July 2018	Catalans Dragons	H	25–20		10,656	

==== Table ====
Pos	Team	Pld	W	D	L	PF	PA	PD	Pts	Qualification
1	St. Helens	23	21	0	2	713	298	+415	42	Super League Super 8s
2	Wigan Warriors	23	16	0	7	573	345	+228	32	Super League Super 8s
3	Castleford Tigers	23	15	1	7	567	480	+87	31	Super League Super 8s
4	Warrington Wolves	23	14	1	8	531	410	+121	29	Super League Super 8s
5	Huddersfield Giants	23	11	1	11	427	629	−202	23	Super League Super 8s
6	Hull F.C.	23	11	0	12	534	544	−10	22	Super League Super 8s
7	Wakefield Trinity	23	10	1	12	581	506	+75	21	Super League Super 8s
8	Catalans Dragons	23	10	1	12	488	531	−43	21	Super League Super 8s
9	Leeds Rhinos	23	8	2	13	441	527	−86	18	The Qualifiers
10	Hull KR	23	8	1	14	476	582	−106	17	The Qualifiers
11	Salford Red Devils	23	7	0	16	384	597	−213	14	The Qualifiers
12	Widnes Vikings	23	3	0	20	387	653	−266	6	The Qualifiers

Source: Rugby League Project

=== Super 8s ===
==== Matches ====
Date	Opponent	H/A	Result	Scorers	Att.	Pos.
10 August 2018	Castleford Tigers	H	24–22		10,293	
18 August 2018	Catalans Dragons	A	35–16		6,739	
31 August 2018	St Helens	A	30–10		14,061	
6 September 2018	Wakefield Trinity	H	25–10		9,959	
14 September 2018	Warrington Wolves	H	26–6		12,372	
20 September 2018	Huddersfield Giants	A	13–6		4,197	
28 September 2018	Hull F.C.	H	14–12		11,189	

==== Table ====
Pos	Team	Pld	W	D	L	PF	PA	PD	Pts	Qualification
1	St. Helens (L)	30	26	0	4	895	408	+487	52	Semi-finals
2	Wigan Warriors (C)	30	23	0	7	740	417	+323	46	Semi-finals
3	Castleford Tigers	30	20	1	9	767	582	+185	41	Semi-finals
4	Warrington Wolves	30	18	1	11	767	561	+206	37	Semi-finals
5	Wakefield Trinity	30	13	1	16	747	696	+51	27	
6	Huddersfield Giants	30	13	1	16	539	794	−255	27	
7	Catalans Dragons	30	12	1	17	596	750	−154	25	
8	Hull F.C.	30	11	0	19	615	787	−172	22	

Source: Rugby League Project
(C) Champions; (L) League Leaders' Shield Winners

=== Grand Final Playoffs ===
Wigan finished second in the league, qualifying them for the Grand Final Playoffs. Wigan beat Castleford Tigers in the semifinals before beating Warrington Wolves, who had knocked them out of the Challenge Cup in the summer, to claim their fifth Grand Final championship.

Date	Match	Opponent	H/A	Result	Scorers	Att.
5 October 2018	Semi-final 2	Castleford Tigers	H	14–0		13,461
13 October 2018	Grand Final	Warrington Wolves	N	12–4		64,892

== Challenge Cup ==
As a 2017 Super League Super 8s team, Wigan Warriors entered the 2018 Challenge Cup in the sixth round and were drawn against Hull KR. Wigan beat Hull KR and progress to the quarterfinals where they were knocked out by Warrington Wolves.

Date	Round	Opponent	H/A	Result	Scorers	Att.
13 May 2018	Sixth Round	Hull KR	A	28–10		3,524
2 June 2018	Quarter Final	Warrington Wolves	A	0–23		10,213

== Transfers ==
=== In ===
Player	From	Contract	Date	Ref.
(Australia) Gabriel Hamlin	South Sydney Rabbitohs	2 Years	October 2017	
(England) Dan Sarginson	Gold Coast Titans	2 Years	December 2017	
(England) Joe Greenwood	Gold Coast Titans	3 ½ Years	June 2018	
(England) Chris Hankinson	Swinton Lions	2 ½ Years	July 2018	

=== Out ===
Player	To	Contract	Date	Ref.
(Scotland) Lewis Tierney	Catalans Dragons	2 Years	October 2017	
(England) Nick Gregson	Leigh Centurions	1 Year	October 2017	
(England) Gabriel Fell	Swinton Lions	1 Year	November 2017	
(England) Kyle Shelford	Swinton Lions	1 Year	October 2017	
(England) Michael McIlorum	Catalans Dragons	2 Years	January 2018	
(Cook Islands) Anthony Gelling	New Zealand Warriors	1 Year	January 2018	
(New Zealand) Frank-Paul Nu'uausala	Sydney Roosters	1 Year	February 2018	
(England) Joel Tomkins	Hull KR	1 ½ Years	June 2018	

=== Loans Out ===
Player	To	Contract	Date	Ref.
(England) Jake Shorrocks	Salford Red Devils	One Month Loan	March 2018	
(England) James Worthington	Toulouse Olympique	One Month Loan	May 2018	
(England) Joe Bretherton	Toulouse Olympique	One Month Loan	May 2018	

== Squad ==
2018 Wigan Warriors Squad
First team squad				Coaching staff
1 Sam Tomkins – FB, SH; 2 Tom Davies – WG; 3 Dan Sarginson – CE, FB; 4 Oliver Gildart – CE; 5 Joe Burgess – WG, CE; 6 George Williams – SO; 7 Sam Powell – HB, HK; 8 Tony Clubb – PR; 9 Thomas Leuluai – HK, HB; 10 Ben Flower – PR; 12 Liam Farrell – SR; 13 Sean O'Loughlin (c) – LF, SO	14 John Bateman – SR, CE; 15 Ryan Sutton – PR, LF; 16; 17 Taulima Tautai – PR, LF; 19 Willie Isa – LF, SR; 20 Morgan Escare – FB; 21 Dominic Manfredi – WG; 22 Liam Marshall – WG; 23 Josh Ganson – HK; 24 Jake Shorrocks – HB, SO; 25 Romain Navarrete – PR; 26 Jack Wells – SR, LF; 27 Callum Field – PR, LF	28 Liam Forsyth – CE, WG; 29 Jack Higginson – CE, WG; 30 Gabriel Hamlin – LF, PR; 31 Joe Bretherton – PR; 32 Caine Barnes – PR; 33 Macauley Davies – SR; 34 Josh Woods – SO, SH; 35 Oliver Partington – PR, LF; 36 Samuel Kibula – PR, LF; 37 James Worthington – CE, WG; 38 Craig Mullen – FB; 39 Liam Paisley – SR; 40 Joe Greenwood – SR	41 Chris Hankinson – CE	Head coach: Shaun Wane; Assistant coaches: John Winder; Paul Johnson; Legend: (c) Captain(s); (vc) Vice-captain(s); Updated: 16 January 2018; Source(s): 2018 Squad Numbers
