= Josh Woods =

Josh Woods may refer to:

- Josh Woods (American football), American linebacker
- Josh Woods (rugby league), English rugby league player
- Josh Woods (wrestler), American professional wrestler
- Josh Woods (footballer), English footballer
- Josh Woods (Canadian football)

== See also ==
- Southwest Airlines Flight 1248, an aviation accident which resulted in the death of a six-year-old boy called Joshua Woods
