= Joe Burgess =

England international rugby league footballer

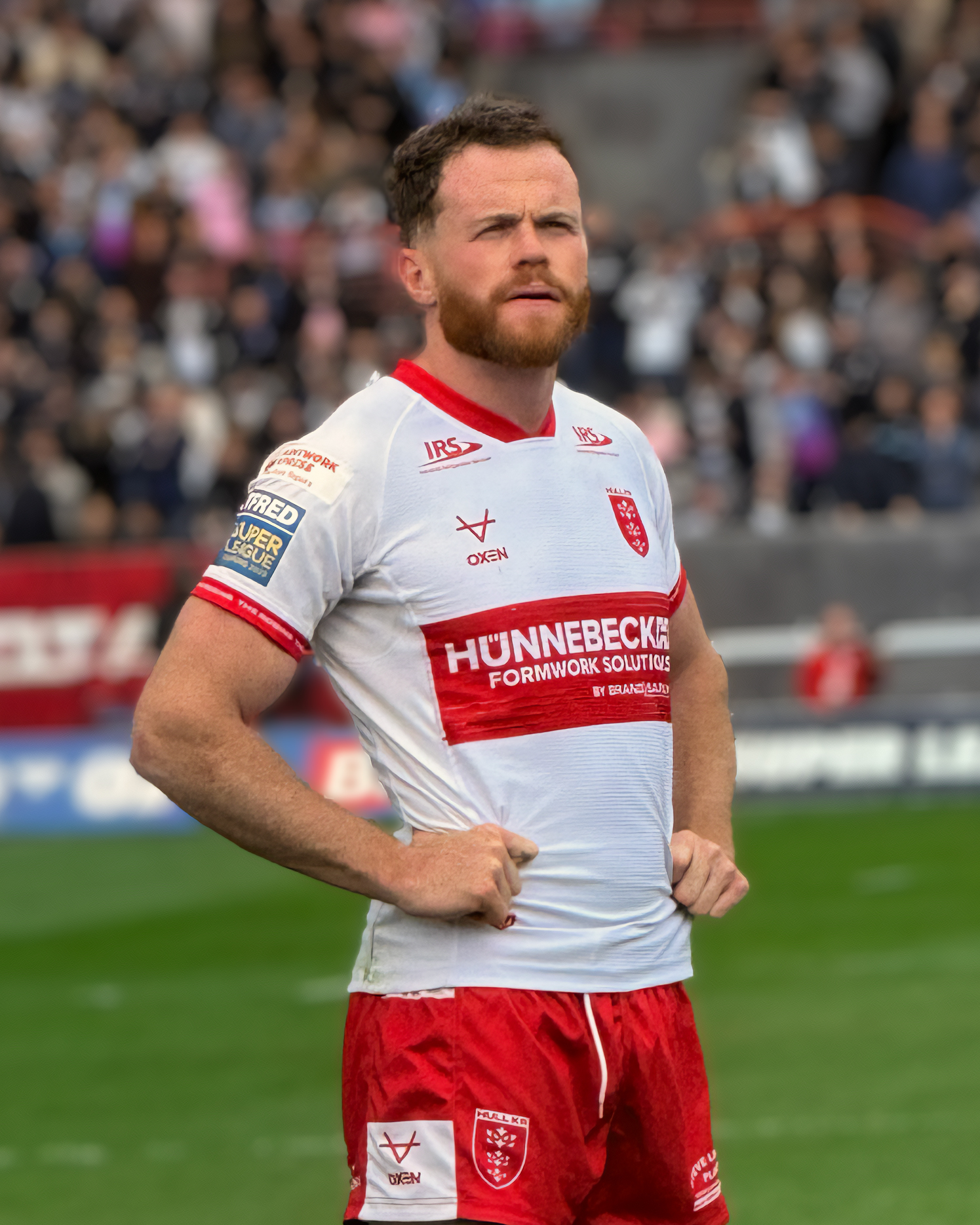

Personal information
- Full name: Joseph Burgess
- Born: 14 October 1994 (age 31) Wigan, Greater Manchester, England
- Height: 6 ft 5 in (1.95 m)
- Weight: 15 st 6 lb (98 kg)

Playing information
- Position: Wing, Centre
Club
Years	Team	Pld	T	G	FG	P
2013–15	Wigan Warriors	55	52	0	0	208
2016	Sydney Roosters	4	2	0	0	8
2016(loan)	→ South Sydney	9	5	0	0	20
2017–20	Wigan Warriors	71	55	0	0	220
2021–24	Salford Red Devils	54	23	0	0	92
2024–26	Hull Kingston Rovers	74	64	0	0	256
2027–	Catalans Dragons	0	0	0	0	0
	Total	267	201	0	0	804
Representative
Years	Team	Pld	T	G	FG	P
2015–25	England	4	1	0	0	4
- Source: As of 9 October 2026

Joe Burgess (born 14 October 1994) is an English rugby league footballer who plays as a winger for Catalans Dragons in the Super League and England at international level.

He previously spent two spells with the Wigan Warriors in the Super League, and has also played for the Sydney Roosters and the South Sydney Rabbitohs in the NRL.

== Background ==
Joe Burgess was born in Wigan, Greater Manchester, England. Joe played amateur rugby for Ince Rose Bridge.

== Playing career ==
=== Wigan academy ===
Burgess joined the Wigan Warriors' academy at the age of 16 from local club Ince Rose Bridge. He played a crucial part in the U19s success in the 2013 season, scoring 24 tries in just 18 appearances.

=== Wigan Warriors ===
For his efforts he was rewarded with 2 appearances in the Super League in 2013, making his début and scoring a try against Hull FC.

In the 2014 season he established himself as the Wigan Warriors' first choice winger, partially because of Josh Charnley's absence. This despite being so surprised at being asked to train with the first team at the start of the season that he made an offensive remark over the phone to coach Shaun Wane, believing it to be a prank. On 4 April 2014, he scored 4 tries during a 52–8 victory over Dewsbury Rams. Burgess enjoyed a fantastic rookie season for the Warriors with 22 tries (17 Super League, 4 Challenge Cup, 1 World Club Challenge) from 24 games. He also marked his first taste of Super League playoff action with a try each in all three of Wigan's playoff contests. First he scored a length of the field try in Wigan's 57-4 week one demolition of the Huddersfield Giants on 18 September 2014 after catching a high ball close to his own try line and sprinted to the opposition try line to score. Then on 3 October 2014, he would score the winning try in the dying minutes of the semi-final at home against the Warrington Wolves to break a 12–12 tie and send Wigan through to the 2014 Super League Grand Final with a 16–12 win. Then in the Grand Final on 11 October 2014 against archrivals St Helens he scored a try just before half time to edge Wigan 6–2 in front despite the Warriors being down to 12 men just two minutes in, but Saints would ultimately win the contest 14–6 at Old Trafford.

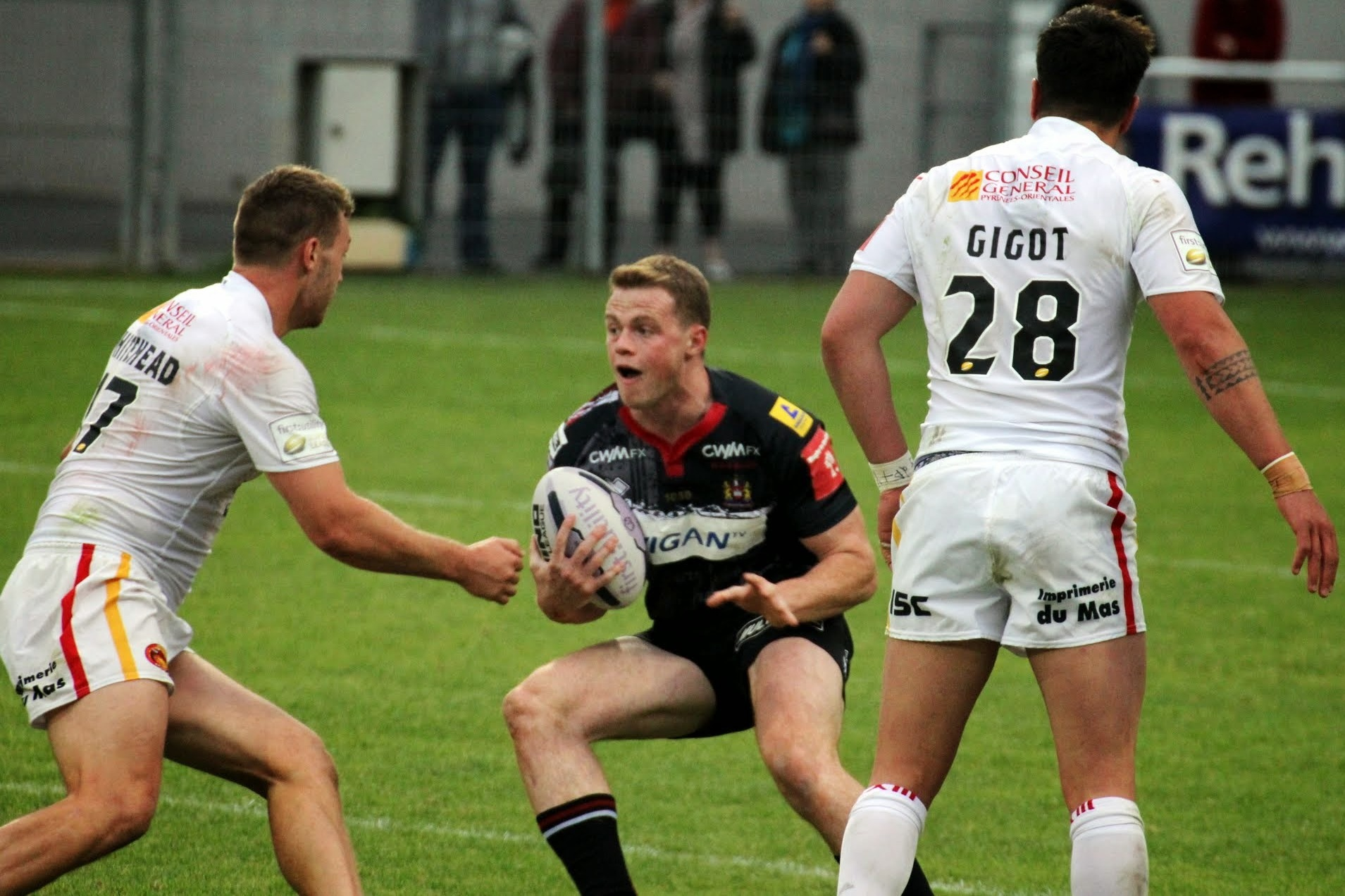
Burgess playing for Wigan in 2015

In 2015, Burgess earned a place in the Super League Dream Team.

He played in the 2015 Super League Grand Final defeat by the Leeds Rhinos at Old Trafford.

=== Sydney Roosters ===
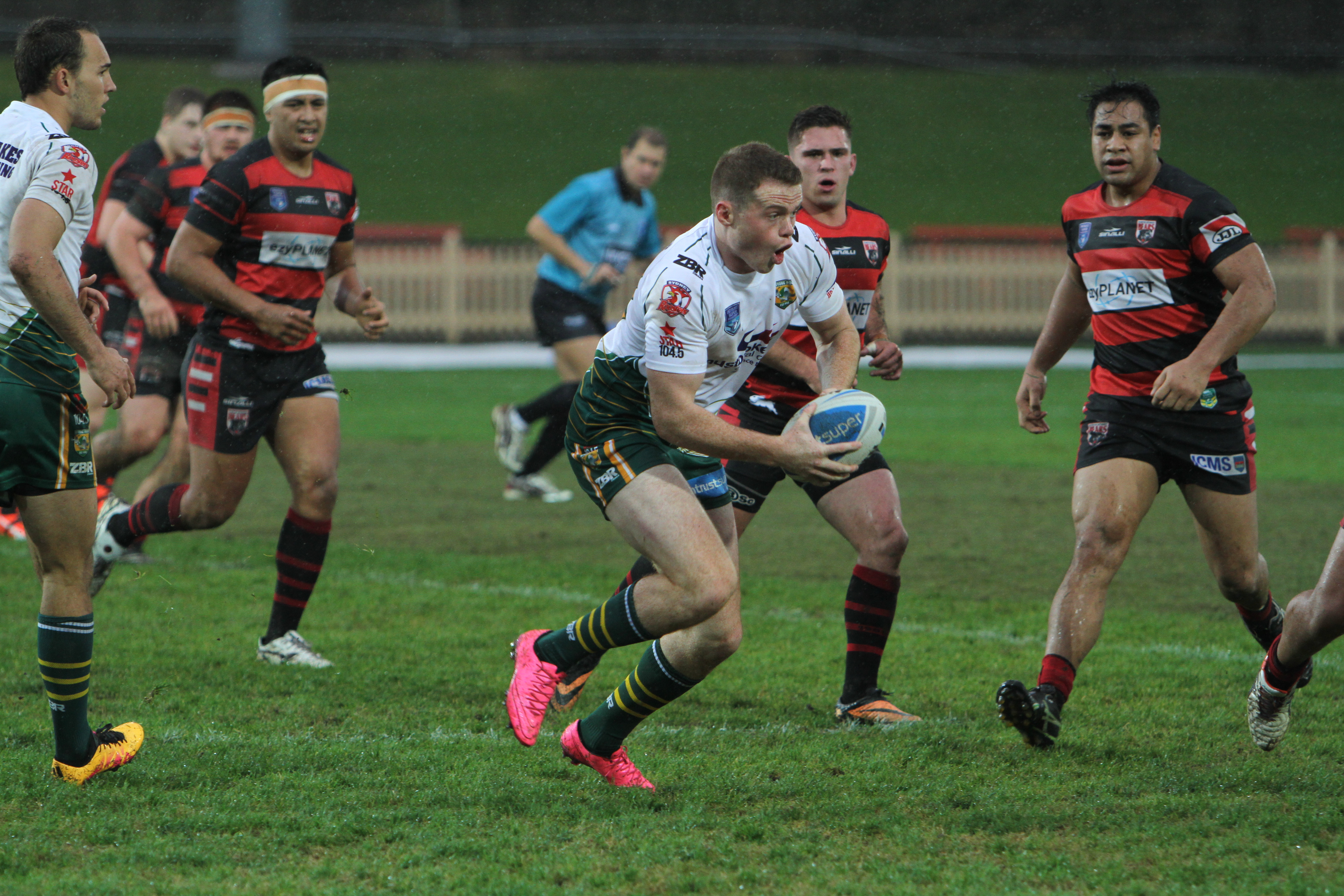
Burgess playing for the Wyong Roos in 2016

Before the 2015 season began, Burgess confirmed he would be heading to Australia in 2016 to play in the National Rugby League with the Sydney Roosters on a three-year contract. On his début, he scored both Roosters tries in their 42–10 loss to the South Sydney Rabbitohs. On 31 July 2016, Burgess played one game for The North Sydney Bears in The Intrust Super Premiership NSW after he was dropped by Souths for poor form. Burgess went on to score a first half hat trick as Norths defeated Wyong 34–10. Midway through the 2016 season it was announced that Burgess would be returning to Wigan in 2017.

=== South Sydney Rabbitohs ===
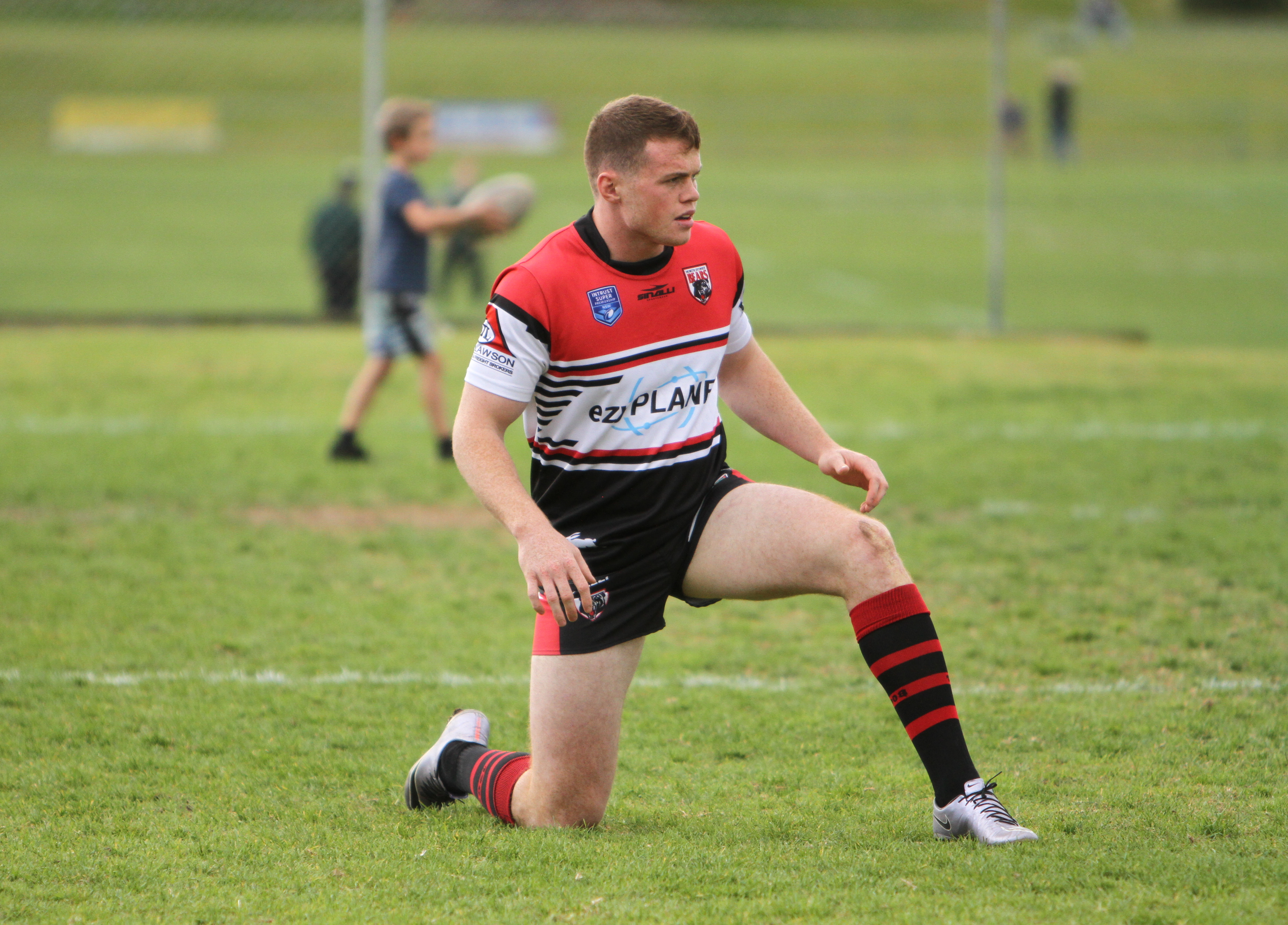
Burgess playing for the North Sydney Bears in 2016

In June 2016, it was announced that Burgess had completed a mid-season loan to South Sydney for the remainder of the 2016 NRL season. Burgess impressed while at South Sydney scoring five tries in nine appearances. Despite interest from South Sydney to stay in Australia he decided his future lay at Wigan.

=== Return to Wigan ===
Burgess returned to Wigan in 2017 after the Roosters agreed to grant a release.

Burgess scored a try on his second début for Wigan on 11 February against Salford Red Devils as the Warriors opened their defence of their Super League title with a 26–16 win. Burgess would also score a hat trick as Wigan won the World Club Challenge for a record fourth time as they defeated the Cronulla-Sutherland Sharks 22–6 on 19 February, becoming the second player in the history of the competition to score a hat trick in the game.

He made his return for the club at Salford Red Devils in Round 1 of Super League where he scored a try thanks to a George Williams grubber kick. A week later he scored a hat-trick to help Wigan win a record breaking fourth World title. He continued his sensational start to the season with two tries against Widnes before an injury in the Round 4 fixture against Leigh Centurions ruled him out for six weeks. He returned on Good Friday to face old rivals St. Helens where thanks to kicks from halfback Williams he scored a brace. Due to the injury crisis at Wigan he was forced to play at centre for several matches however that didn't affect his scoring ability as he scored another brace against the Catalans Dragons in Round 11 to take his tally to 10 for the season in all competitions.

In their first Challenge Cup fixture of the year he scored another brace of tries one from his own kick through and the other from second rower Liam Farrell's kick. At the Magic Weekend in Newcastle he collected a high bomb from captain O'Loughlin to gain a draw in a dramatic match but Williams could not convert to win the game. Round 15 saw Warriors travel to St Helens where he scored off the back of yet another Williams grubber kick. Tries in the away defeats at Hull FC, and Leigh Centurions followed before a brace in the Challenge Cup quarter final at Warrington Wolves.

Round 20 saw Burgess get his 19th and 20th tries of the season before scoring a hat-trick in the south of France against the Catalans Dragons. He suffered by his standards a drought and did not score for the next five matches before his 7th brace of the season in the third round of the Super 8's against Salford. His last try of the season came in the Challenge Cup final against Hull FC, his try coming as late consolation after a Liam Farrell cut out pass found him on the wing at Wembley Stadium.

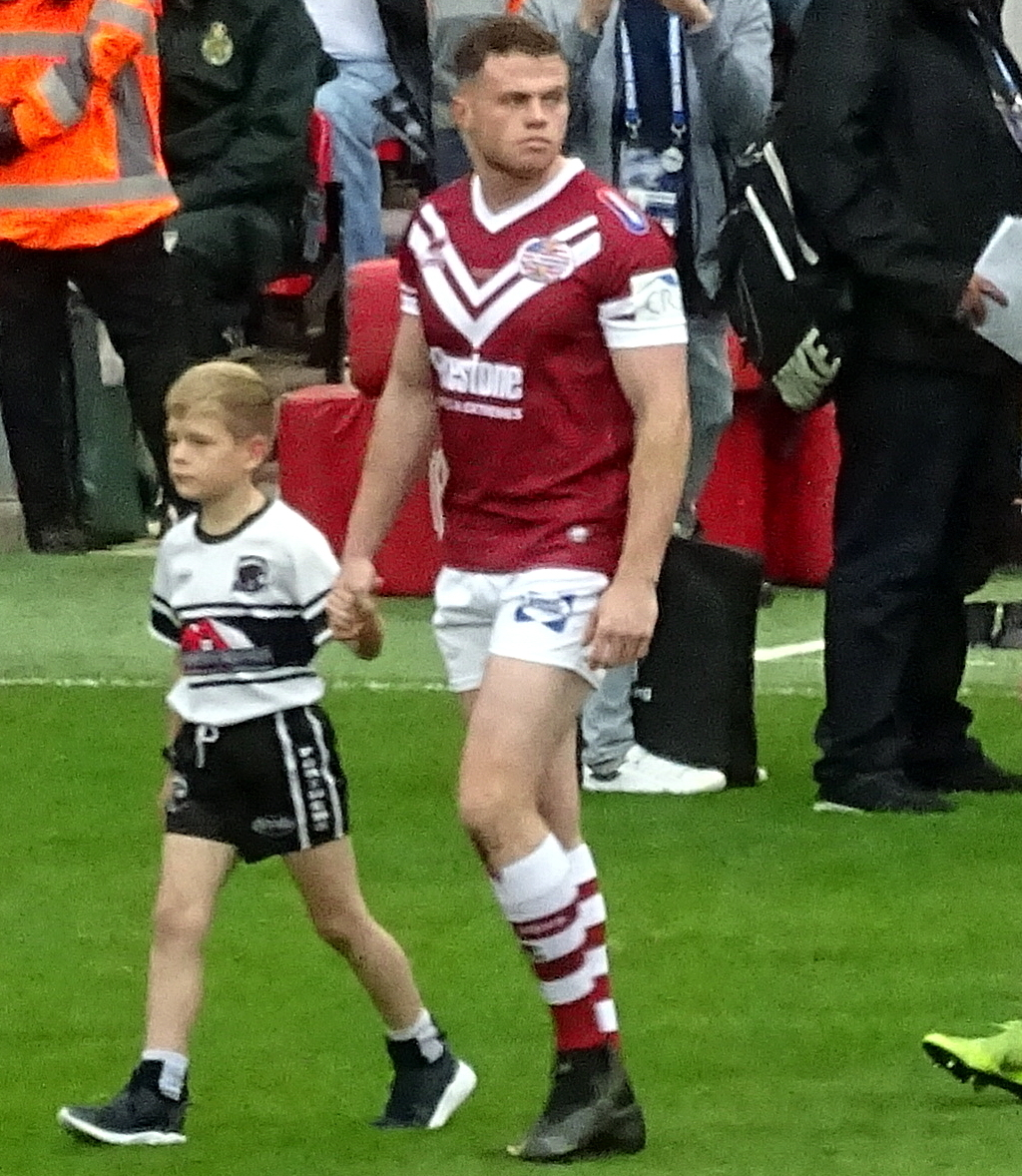
Burgess taking the field for Wigan at Anfield in 2019

Burgess played in the 2020 Super League Grand Final which Wigan lost 8–4 against St Helens.

=== Salford Red Devils ===
On 4 December 2020, it was announced that Burgess would join Salford from the 2021 season on a two-year deal. In round 21 of the 2022 Betfred Super League season, Burgess scored two tries for Salford in a 44–12 upset victory over St Helens RFC. In the 2023 Super League season, Burgess played 23 matches for Salford as the club finished 7th on the table and missed the playoffs.

=== Hull Kingston Rovers ===
On 9 January 2024, Burgess joined Hull Kingston Rovers on a one-year deal ahead of the 2024 Super League season. Burgess was released by Salford after the club said his conduct was deemed "not consistent" with the clubs expected standards. On 12 October 2024, Burgess played in Hull Kingston Rovers 2024 Super League Grand Final loss against Wigan. On 7 June 2025, Burgess played in Hull Kingston Rovers 8-6 2025 Challenge Cup final victory over Warrington. It was the clubs first major trophy in 40 years. In round 20 of the 2025 Super League season, Burgess scored four tries in Hull Kingston Rovers 74–12 victory over Salford. Burgess played a crucial part in Hull Kingston Rovers 1st placed season were they won the League Leaders Shield on 18 September beating Warrington on the last game of the regular season On 9 October 2025, Burgess played in Hull Kingston Rovers 2025 Super League Grand Final victory over Wigan scoring two tries. On 19 February 2026, Burgess played in Hull Kingston Rovers World Club Challenge victory against Brisbane.

=== Catalans Dragons ===
On 27 August 2026 it was reported that he had signed for Catalans Dragons in the Super League

=== International ===
After the 2014 Super League season, Burgess was selected in the England team for the 2014 Four Nations held in Australia and New Zealand however he did not play a match.

He earned another call-up to the England squad for their test series against New Zealand. Burgess made his début for England in a test match, before the series, against France which saw Burgess score a try in England's win over their opponents. Burgess played in the first two tests of the series against New Zealand before being dropped for the third game.

Burgess returned to the England side after a ten-year absence when selected for the third test against Australia in the 2025 series.

== Career statistics ==
Year	Team	Games	Tries	Points
2013	Wigan Warriors	2	1	4
2014	Wigan Warriors	26	24	96
2015	Wigan Warriors	29	26	104
2016	Sydney Roosters	4	2	8
2016	South Sydney Rabbitohs	9	5	20
2017	Wigan Warriors	26	26	104
2018	Wigan Warriors	8	8	32
2019	Wigan Warriors	24	14	56
2020	Wigan Warriors	13	7	28
2021	Salford Red Devils	8	3	12
2022	Salford Red Devils	21	16	64
2023	Salford Red Devils	25	4	16
2024	Hull Kingston Rovers	23	18	74
2025	Hull Kingston Rovers	25	24	96
2026	Hull Kingston Rovers	26	22	88
2027	Catalans Dragons			
	Total	267	201	804
