= 2020 Super League Grand Final =

Wigan Warriors	St Helens
4	8
	1	2	Total
WIG	0	4	4
STH	2	6	8
- Date: 27 November 2020
- Stadium: KCOM Stadium
- Location: Hull
- Harry Sunderland Trophy: (England) James Roby ( St Helens)
- Jerusalem: Laura Wright
- Referee: Chris Kendall
- Attendance: 0 (Note: Behind closed doors due to the COVID-19 pandemic in the United Kingdom)

Broadcast partners
- Broadcasters: (United Kingdom) Sky Sports (Australia) Fox League

The 2020 Super League Grand Final was the 23rd official grand final and championship-deciding game of Super League XXV. The game was won 8–4 by St Helens over their local rivals Wigan Warriors. Due to the COVID-19 pandemic, it was the first Super League Grand Final not held at Old Trafford.

== Stadium selection ==
Initially, Old Trafford was confirmed as the venue for the 2020 Super League Grand Final, with the Premier League scheduling Manchester United's tie against Southampton, on the same day, to be played away at St Mary's Stadium in order to allow Old Trafford to accommodate the Grand Final. However with an increasing number of positive COVID-19 tests in rugby league players and match postponements approaching the game, Manchester United and the Super League withdrew from the agreement on 17 October as Old Trafford would be unable to accommodate a change in date with them hosting İstanbul Başakşehir and Paris Saint Germain midweek either side of the Grand Final weekend in the Champions League. On 22 October it was announced that the game would be played at the KCOM Stadium, Hull on Friday 27 November with an 8pm kick-off. Criticism was met with the selection of KCOM as the venue, with some people saying it was a poor attempt to expand rugby league's reach, whereas other were saying it was the most iconic Super League stadium and that stadium selection did not matter as fans were not allowed to attend.

== Background ==
The two finalists finished first and second in the regular season with Wigan winning 13 of their 17 games and St Helens 12 out of 17. These league positions earned both clubs byes to the second (semi-final) round of the play-offs and home advantage in their semi-final matches.

Pos	Team	Pld	W	D	L	PF	PA	PP	WPCT
1	Wigan Warriors	17	13	0	4	408	278	146.8	76.47
2	St Helens	17	12	0	5	469	195	240.5	70.59

=== Route to the final ===
==== Wigan Warriors ====
Wigan finished first in the regular season, to claim their first League Leaders Shield since 2012, and a first trophy for head coach, Adrian Lam. In their semi-final they played Hull F.C. the lowest ranked winning team from the elimination finals. Wigan won the match 29–2, with tries from Joe Burgess, Harry Smith, Zak Hardaker, Jake Bibby and Bevan French to reach the grand final, for an 11th time.

Round	Opposition	Score
Semi-final	Hull FC (H)	29–2
Key: (H) = Home venue; (A) = Away venue; (N) = Neutral venue.

==== St Helens ====
Reigning and defending champions St Helens finished second in the regular season against Catalans Dragons the higher ranked winning team from the elimination finals. St Helens won the match 48–2, to reach the grand final, for a record 12th time.

Round	Opposition	Score
Preliminary Final	Catalans Dragons (H)	48–2
Key: (H) = Home venue; (A) = Away venue; (N) = Neutral venue.

== Match details ==
27 November 2020

Wigan Warriors	4–8	St Helens RFC
Tries: Bibby 66’ Goals: Hardaker (0/2)	Report	Tries: Welsby 80'; Goals: Coote (2/2) 40'(pen), 73'(pen)

KCOM Stadium, Hull
Attendance: 0
Referee: Chris Kendall (Huddersfield)

Wigan Warriors		Position	St Helens	
6	(Australia) Bevan French	Fullback	1	(Scotland) Lachlan Coote
23	(England) Jake Bibby	Wing	2	(England) Tommy Makinson
1	(England) Zak Hardaker	Centre	3	(Fiji) Kevin Naiqama
4	(England) Oliver Gildart	Centre	22	(England) Jack Welsby
5	(England) Joe Burgess (substituted off) 24' (substituted on) 38'	Wing	5	(Wales) Regan Grace
7	(New Zealand) Thomas Leuluai	Stand-off	6	(England) Jonny Lomax
31	(United Kingdom) Jackson Hastings	Scrum-half	7	(France) Theo Fages
19	(England) Joe Bullock (substituted off) 15' (substituted on) 51' (substituted off) 60'	Prop	8	(England) Alex Walmsley (substituted off) 29' (substituted on) 61'
9	(England) Sam Powell	Hooker	9	(England) James Roby
38	(Ireland) Brad Singleton (substituted off) 25' (substituted on) 54'	Prop	32	(England) James Graham (substituted off) 20'
11	(Samoa) Willie Isa	Second-row	11	(Cook Islands) Zeb Taia
12	(England) Liam Farrell	Second-row	20	(Ireland) James Bentley
17	(England) Oliver Partington (substituted off) 38' (substituted on) 60'	Loose forward	14	(Wales) Morgan Knowles (substituted off) 35'
8	(England) Tony Clubb (substituted on) 15' (substituted off) 29'	Interchange	12	(Cook Islands) Dominique Peyroux (substituted off) 58'
15	(England) Joe Greenwood (substituted on) 24' (substituted off) 51'	Interchange	13	(Ireland) Louie McCarthy-Scarsbrook (substituted on) 29' (substituted off) 61'
13	(England) Sean O'Loughlin (substituted on) 29' (substituted off) 54' (substituted on) 77'	Interchange	15	(England) Matty Lees (substituted on) 20' (substituted on) 58'
16	(England) Morgan Smithies (substituted on) 25' (substituted off) 77'	Interchange	16	(Ireland) Kyle Amor (substituted on) 35'
	(Papua New Guinea) Adrian Lam	Coach		(Australia) Kristian Woolf

Both teams normal kit colours are red and white, but with Wigan having finished higher in the league, they were the 'home team' which meant that they were playing in their normal red and white colours, with St Helens playing in their alternate blue and white kit.

The game was the lowest scoring grand final in the history of Super League, but has been described as one of the greatest and most dramatic grand finals.

In a game dominated by defences, there was no scoring until the last minute of the first half, when St Helens were awarded a penalty for a shoulder charge by Morgan Smithies on Lachlan Coote. Coote took the kick himself to give St Helens a 2–0 half-time lead. The closest effort to a try had seen Wigan's Zak Hardaker prevented from scoring by five St Helens defenders, when he was held-up (Note: The laws of rugby league require the ball to be touched down in the in-goal area with downward pressure exerted by the player for a try to be awarded. If a player is prevented from getting the ball down, they are said to be "held up") over the St Helens goal line after 28 minutes

The second half continued in the same fashion, with scoring opportunities limited. St Helens thought they had scored on 55 minutes, when Zeb Taia grounded a kick from James Roby, but referee Chris Kendall disallowed the try for offside, a decision confirmed by video referee Ben Thaler.

Wigan's Jake Bibby finally scored the first try of the game, after 66 minutes when he touched down in the corner. Hardaker's conversion attempt bounced off the crossbar to give Wigan a 4–2 lead. With less than 10 minutes left, St Helens were awarded another penalty as Jackson Hastings was adjudged to have high tackled Theo Fages. Coote made his second successful kick to level the scores up at 4–4. In the 78th minute, Wigan were awarded a penalty when Theo Fages was ruled offside. From just inside the Saints half of the field, Hardaker's kick drifted right of the goalposts, leaving the scores tied. As the game went into its final seconds, Saints winger Tommy Makinson attempted a drop goal, and as the hooter sounded the end of the game, the ball bounced back off the goal post, and bounced into the Wigan in-goal area, where St Helens centre Jack Welsby out-sprinted Wigan fullback Bevan French to score the match winning try.
