= Liam Paisley =

English rugby league footballer (born 1997)

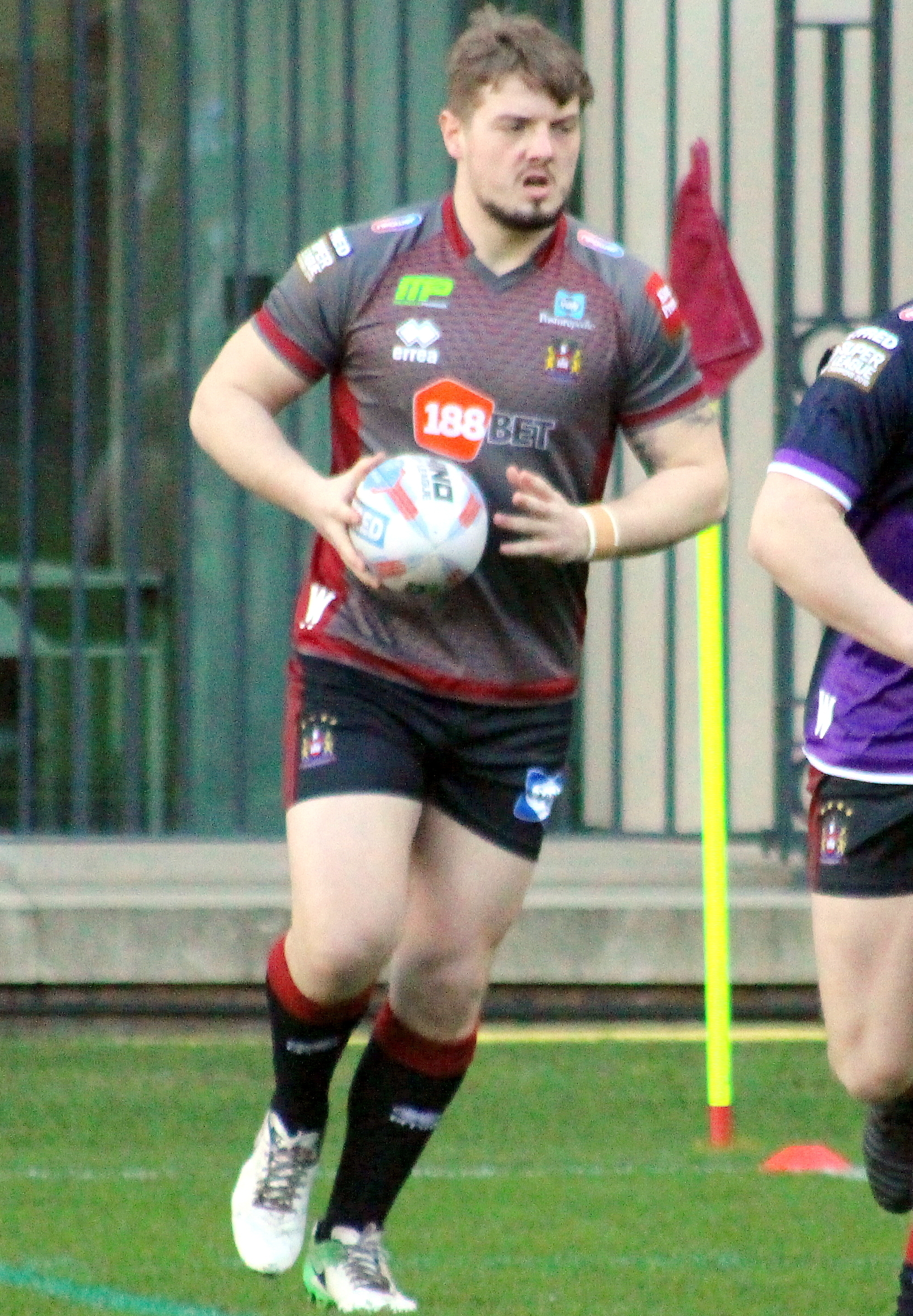

Personal information
- Born: 27 November 1997 (age 28) Cumbria, England
- Height: 6 ft 0 in (1.83 m)
- Weight: 15 st 10 lb (100 kg)

Playing information
- Position: Second-row
Club
Years	Team	Pld	T	G	FG	P
2017–19	Wigan Warriors	9	2	0	0	8
2017(loan)	→ Swinton Lions	6	1	0	0	4
2018(loan)	→ Swinton Lions	6	3	0	0	12
2019(loan)	→ Swinton Lions	11	6	0	0	24
2019–	Barrow Raiders	6	0	0	0	0
	Total	38	12	0	0	48
- Source: As of 13 August 2019

Liam Paisley (born 27 November 1997) was a professional rugby league footballer who plays as a second-row forward for the Barrow Raiders in the Championship.

He played for the Wigan Warriors in the Super League.

In 2018 he made his Super League début for Wigan against the Castleford Tigers.
