= Joe Bullock (rugby league) =

English semi-professional rugby league footballer

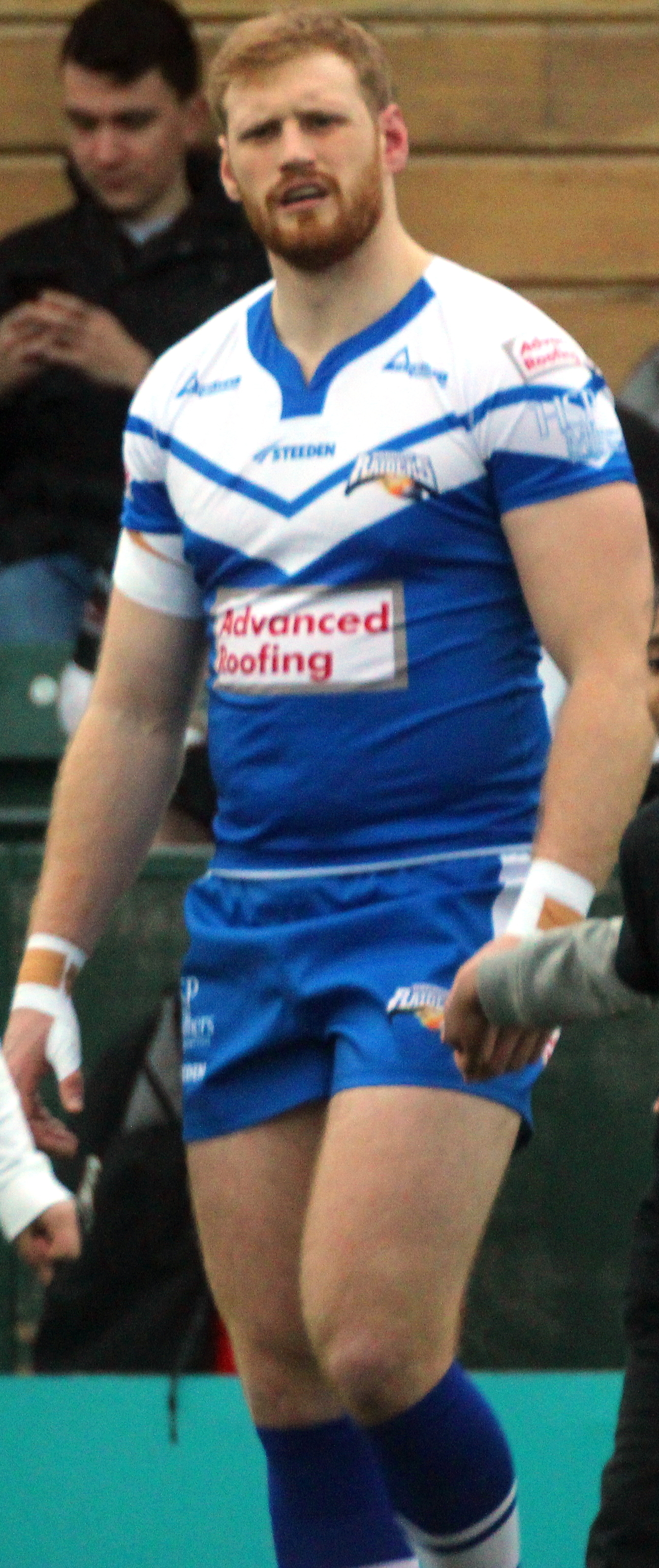

Personal information
- Full name: Joseph Allan Bullock
- Born: 27 November 1992 (age 33) Blackpool, Lancashire, England
- Height: 6 ft 5 in (1.95 m)
- Weight: 17 st 7 lb (111 kg)

Playing information
- Position: Prop
Club
Years	Team	Pld	T	G	FG	P
2012	Wigan Warriors	0	0	0	0	0
2012(loan)	→ S. Wales Scorpions	5	0	0	0	0
2013–14	Leigh Centurions	7	2	0	0	8
2013(loan)	→ S. Wales Scorpions	1	1	0	0	0
2014(loan)	→ Barrow Raiders	21	0	0	0	0
2015–18	Barrow Raiders	101	21	0	0	84
2019–21	Wigan Warriors	57	4	0	0	16
2022–24	Warrington Wolves	51	2	0	0	8
2024(DR)	→Widnes Vikings	1	0	0	0	0
2024(loan)	→Hull F.C.	2	0	0	0	0
2024(loan)	→Salford Red Devils	8	0	0	0	0
2025	Salford Red Devils	8	0	0	0	0
2025 (loan)	→Barrow Raiders	0	0	0	0	0
2025–	Barrow Raiders	30	10	0	0	40
	Total	292	40	0	0	156
Representative
Years	Team	Pld	T	G	FG	P
2016	Cumbria	1	0	0	0	0
- Source: As of 18 August 2025

Joe Bullock (born 27 November 1992) is an English semi-professional rugby league footballer who plays as a prop forward for the Barrow Raiders in the RFL Championship.

Bullock has spent time on loan from Wigan at the South Wales Scorpions in Championship 1. Bullock played for the Leigh Centurions in the Championship, and on loan from Leigh at South Wales in Championship 1, and the Barrow Raiders in the Championship. He joined Barrow on a permanent deal in Championship 1, League 1 and Betfred Championship.

== Background ==
Bullock was born in Blackpool, Lancashire, England.

== Playing career ==
=== Wigan ===
He began his career as a winger for Blackpool Scorpions ARLFC before being scouted by Wigan whilst still a junior. In 2019, he made his Super League début for Wigan against St Helens. Bullock played in the 2020 Super League Grand Final which Wigan lost 8-4 against St Helens.

=== Warrington ===
In 2022, Bullock signed for Warrington. In his first season at the club he played 24 matches as the Warrington side finished 11th on the table and narrowly avoided relegation. Bullock played 17 games for Warrington in the 2023 Super League season as Warrington finished sixth on the table and qualified for the playoffs. He played in the clubs elimination playoff loss against St Helens.

=== Widnes (DR loan) ===
On 18 February 2024, it was reported that he had signed for Widnes in the RFL Championship on DR loan.

=== Hull F.C. (loan) ===
On 27 February 2024, it was reported that he had signed for Hull F.C. in the Super League on short-term loan.

=== Salford (loan) ===
On 16 Jul 2024 it was reported that he had signed for Salford in the Super League on season-long loan

=== Salford ===
On 23 October 2024, it was reported that he had signed for Salford in the Super League on a two-year deal, making his earlier loan move permanent.

=== Barrow Raiders (loan) ===
On 9 April 2025 it was reported that he had signed for Barrow Raiders in the RFL Championship on a short-term loan

On 26 June 2025 it was reported that he had re-joined Barrow Raiders for the second time this season on DR loan

=== Barrow Raiders ===
On 13 August 2025 it was reported that he has turned his loan move into a permanent move and signed for Barrow Raiders in the RFL Championship on a 2-year deal.
