= Craig Mullen =

English rugby league footballer

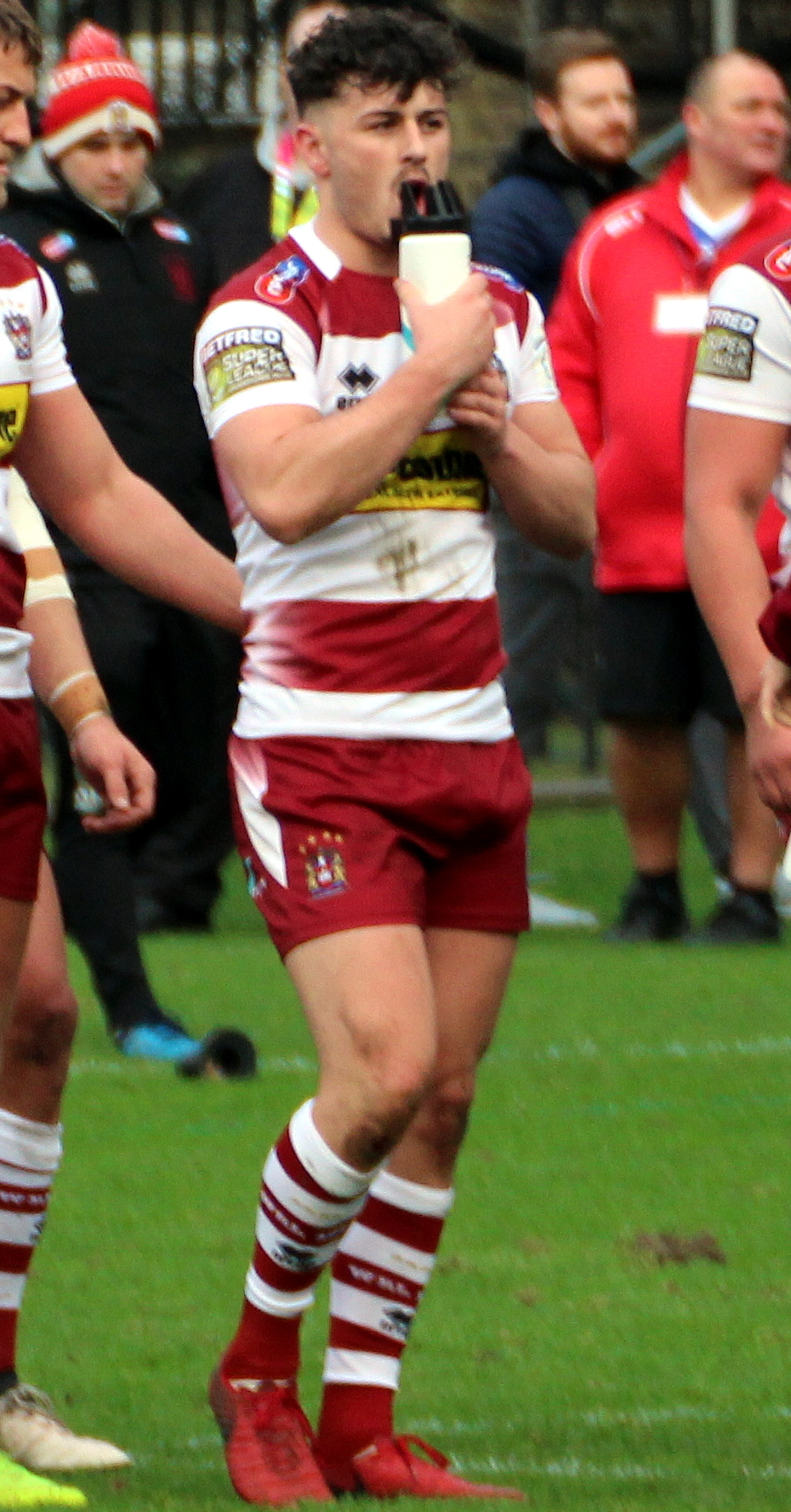

Personal information
- Born: 15 January 1998 (age 27); Wigan, Greater Manchester, England
- Height: 6 ft 10 in (2.08 m)
- Weight: 13 st 9 lb (87 kg)

Playing information
- Position: Fullback, Wing
Club
Years	Team	Pld	T	G	FG	P
2018–20	Wigan Warriors	3	0	0	0	0
2018(loan)	→ London Skolars	1	1	0	0	4
2018(loan)	→ Swinton Lions	7	2	0	0	8
2019(loan)	→ London Skolars	7	2	0	1	9
2019(loan)	→ Swinton Lions	10	1	0	0	4
2020(loan)	→ Leigh Centurions	2	0	0	0	0
2021	Leigh Centurions	14	1	13	0	12
2022	Newcastle Thunder	20	6	11	0	46
	Total	64	13	24	1	83
- Source: As of 17 January 2023

Craig Mullen (born 15 January 1998) is a former professional rugby league footballer who last played as a fullback or winger for Newcastle Thunder in the RFL Championship.

He played for the Wigan Warriors in the Super League, and has spent time on loan from Wigan at the London Skolars in League 1, and the Swinton Lions and Leigh in the Championship.

== Background ==
Mullen was born in Wigan, Greater Manchester, England.

== Career ==
=== Wigan Warriors ===
In 2018 he made his Super League début for Wigan against Wakefield Trinity.

=== Leigh Centurions ===
It was announced on 18 November 2020 that Craig would join Leigh on a permanent basis for the 2021 season.

=== Newcastle Thunder ===
On 25 Oct 2021 it was reported that he had signed for Newcastle Thunder in the RFL Championship.
