= Liam Byrne (rugby league) =

Ireland international rugby league footballer

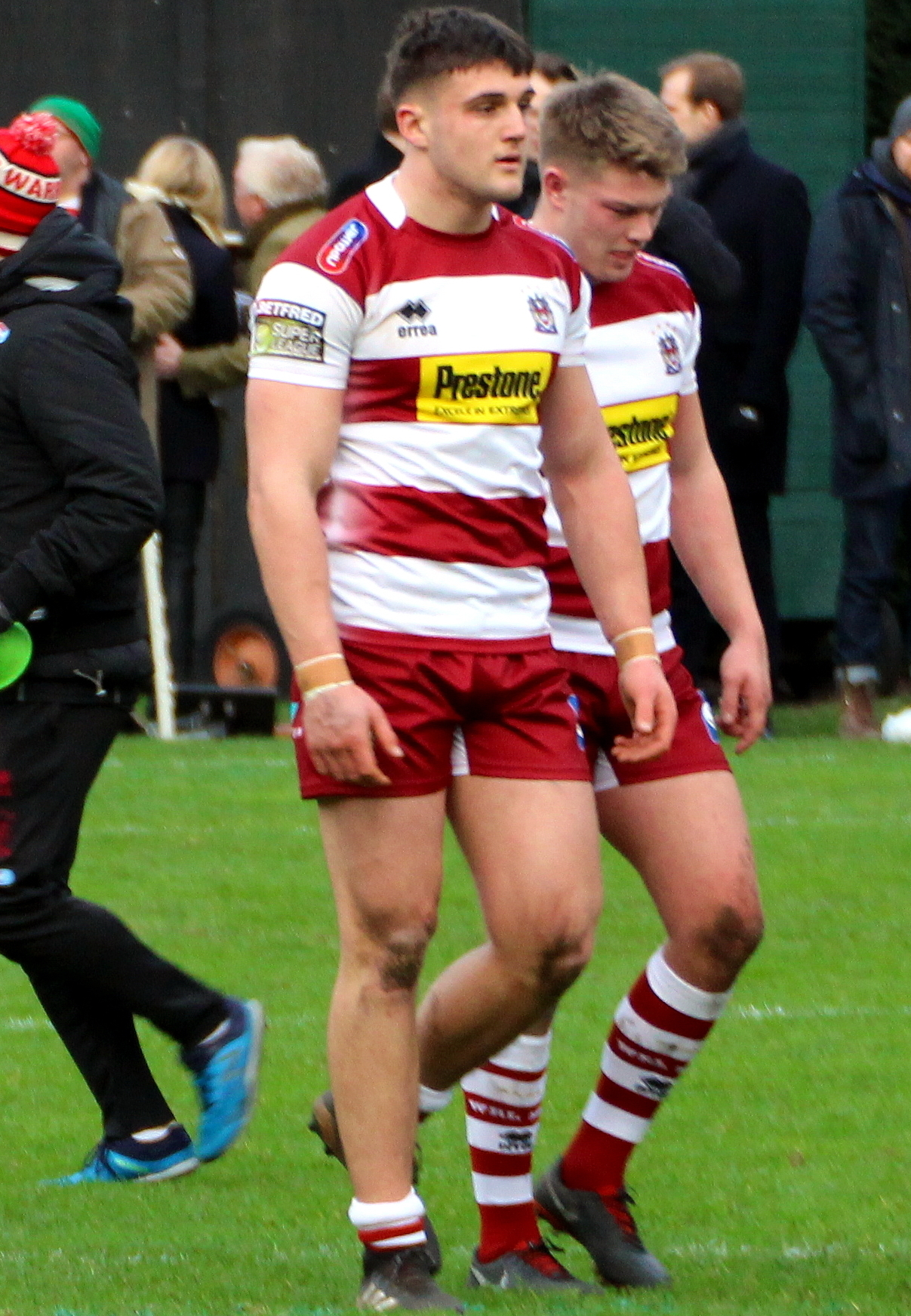

Personal information
- Born: 18 August 1999 (age 27) Salford, Greater Manchester, England
- Height: 6 ft 3 in (1.91 m)
- Weight: 17 st 0 lb (108 kg)

Playing information
- Position: Prop
Club
Years	Team	Pld	T	G	FG	P
2017–25	Wigan Warriors	155	4	0	0	16
2017(loan)	→ Workington Town	5	0	0	0	0
2018(loan)	→ Leigh Centurions	1	0	0	0	0
2019(loan)	→ Swinton Lions	7	1	0	0	4
2026–	Warrington Wolves	31	1	0	0	4
	Total	199	6	0	0	24
Representative
Years	Team	Pld	T	G	FG	P
2018–	Ireland	7	0	0	0	0
- Source: As of 16 November 2026

Liam Byrne (born 18 August 1999) is an Ireland international rugby league footballer who plays as a prop forward for the Warrington Wolves in the Super League.

He has spent time on loan from Wigan at Workington Town in the Betfred League 1, as well as the Leigh Centurions and the Swinton Lions in the Championship.

== Background ==
Byrne was born in Salford, Greater Manchester, England. He is of Irish heritage.

== Career ==
=== Wigan Warriors ===
In 2019, he made his Super League debut for Wigan against Hull F.C.

On 28 May 2022, Byrne played for Wigan in their 2022 Challenge Cup Final victory over Huddersfield. On 24 February 2024, Byrne played in Wigan's 2024 World Club Challenge final victory over Penrith. In the 2024 Good Friday game against arch-rivals St Helens, Byrne was shown a straight red card for a dangerous high tackle in Wigan's 12-4 loss. He was later suspended for four games and fined £750. On 12 October 2024, Byrne played in Wigan's 9-2 2024 Super League Grand Final victory over Hull Kingston Rovers. On 9 October 2025, Byrne played in Wigan's 24-6 2025 Super League Grand Final loss against Hull Kingston Rovers.

=== Warrington Wolves ===
On 10 September 2025 it was reported that he had signed for Warrington Wolves on a two-year deal On 3 October 2026, Byrne played in the 2026 Super League Grand Final, which Warrington lost to Wakefield Trinity 23-10.

== Honours ==
=== Wigan Warriors ===
- Super League
  - Winners (2): 2023, 2024
- League Leaders' Shield
  - Winners (3): 2020, 2023, 2024
- Challenge Cup
  - Winners (1): 2022, 2024
- World Club Challenge
  - Winners (1): 2024
