= Jake Shorrocks =

English rugby league footballer

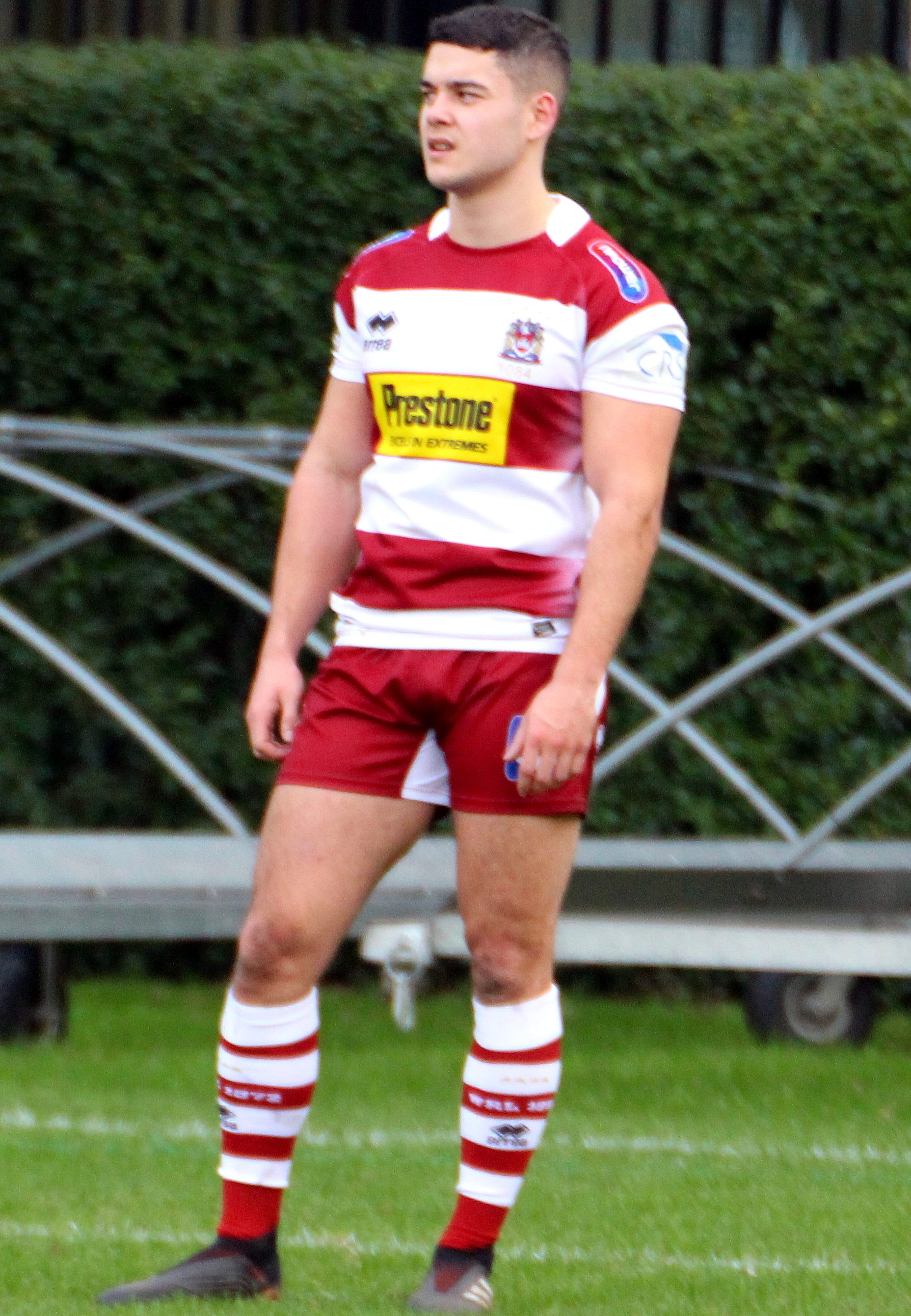

Personal information
- Born: 26 October 1995 (age 30) Wigan, Greater Manchester, England
- Height: 5 ft 10 in (1.78 m)
- Weight: 12 st 11 lb (81 kg)

Playing information
- Position: Scrum-half, Stand-off
Club
Years	Team	Pld	T	G	FG	P
2015–20	Wigan Warriors	29	2	8	0	24
2015(loan)	→ Workington Town	3	0	2	0	4
2016(loan)	→ Swinton Lions	1	0	0	0	0
2018(loan)	→ Salford Red Devils	11	0	2	0	4
2019(loan)	→ Swinton Lions	3	0	0	0	0
2021–22	Newcastle Thunder	30	5	36	0	92
2023–	Toulouse Olympique	70	9	288	1	613
	Total	147	16	336	1	737
- Source: As of 13 October 2026
- Relatives: Joe Shorrocks (brother)

Jake Shorrocks (born 26 October 1995) is a professional rugby league footballer who plays as a scrum-half or stand-off for Toulouse Olympique in the Super League.

== Background ==
Shorrocks was born in Wigan, Greater Manchester, England.He attended Standish High School playing in a year 7 national final at Wembley. He played his amateur rugby for Wigan St Patrick’s before signing for Wigan Warriors scholarship

== Playing career ==
=== Wigan Warriors ===
He played 29 times in the super league over a 5 year period. Made his debut against Widnes in 2016 and helped play a prominent role in the lead up to Wigan’s 2016 grand final win playing in the semi final against Hull FC. The following year he injured his ACL and managed to come back and feature several more times over the coming years at his hometown club. He has spent time on loan from Wigan at Workington Town and Swinton Lions in the Championship, and Salford Red Devils in the Super League.

=== Newcastle Thunder ===
On 22 December 2020 it was announced that Shorrocks would leave Wigan at the end of the 2020 season to join Newcastle Thunder with team-mate Josh Woods.

=== Toulouse Olympique ===
In November 2022, Shorrocks joined the Championship club Toulouse Olympique after their relegation from the Super League. Shorrocks was the division's leading regular season goalscorer in 2023, ahead of Sheffield's Cory Aston, and scored the second-highest points tally, behind Aston. The star scrum half would lead Toulouse to 2 grand finals in consecutive years ultimately losing both to London and Wakefield respectively. In the 2025 RFL Championship grand final, Shorrocks kicked all five goals for Toulouse as they defeated York 10-8.
