= Zak Hardaker =

Great Britain and England international rugby league footballer

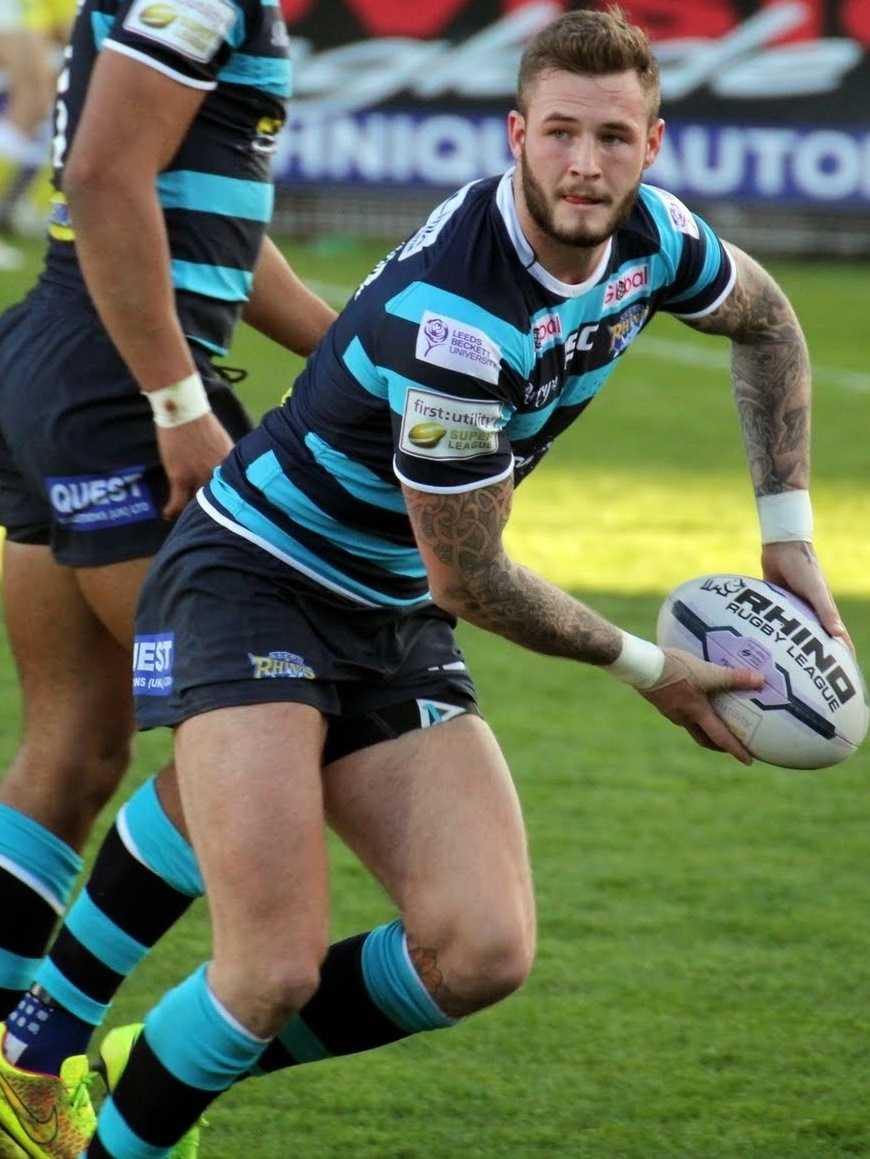

Personal information
- Full name: Zak Alexander Hardaker
- Born: 17 October 1991 (age 34) Pontefract, West Yorkshire, England
- Height: 6 ft 1 in (1.85 m)
- Weight: 14 st 2 lb (90 kg)

Playing information
- Position: Fullback, Centre, Wing stand off, half back, second row, loose forward
Club
Years	Team	Pld	T	G	FG	P
2010	Featherstone Rovers	14	22	0	0	112
2011–16	Leeds Rhinos	173	69	55	1	387
2011(loan)	→ Featherstone Rovers	5	6	0	0	24
2016(loan)	→ Penrith Panthers	11	1	0	0	4
2017(loan)	→ Castleford Tigers	19	5	0	0	20
2017	Castleford Tigers	11	8	1	0	34
2019–22	Wigan Warriors	80	26	218	2	542
2022	Leeds Rhinos	18	1	12	0	32
2023–24	Leigh Leopards	54	10	39	0	118
2025–26	Hull F.C.	47	6	84	0	192
2027–	York Knights	0	0	0	0	0
	Total	432	154	409	3	1465
Representative
Years	Team	Pld	T	G	FG	P
2012	England Knights	1	2	0	0	8
2012–15	England	7	2	0	0	8
2019	Great Britain	2	0	0	0	0
- Source: As of 9 October 2026

Zak Alexander Hardaker (born 17 October 1991) is an English professional rugby league footballer who plays as a centre or fullback for the York Knights in the Super League. He has played for the England Knights, England and Great Britain at international level.

Hardaker previously played for as a centre, fullback and on the wing for Featherstone Rovers in the Championship, and the Leeds Rhinos over two separate spells in the Super League. He has spent time on loan from Leeds at the Penrith Panthers in the NRL and the Castleford Tigers in the Super League.

Hardaker has won two Challenge Cups and three Super League championships with Leeds. Individually he has been named to the Super League Dream Team on two occasions, and was the 2015 Man of Steel.

In September 2017, Hardaker failed a drugs test after testing positive for cocaine. He was subsequently dropped by Castleford and England and missed the 2017 Super League Grand Final, which Castleford lost 24–6 to Leeds, and the 2017 Rugby League World Cup before being dismissed by Castleford on 21 February 2018. On 30 April 2018 UK Anti-Doping announced that Hardaker was banned from all sports for 14 months, backdated to the date of the original failed drugs test and suspension on 8 September 2017.

Whilst still suspended, Hardaker signed for Wigan in May 2018 before joining them in November 2018 after his suspension ended. Whilst preparing for his comeback, he was banned from driving after being arrested for drink-driving at the end of September 2018.

On 20 January 2019 he made his debut for Wigan, having not played for 16 months, and scored 12 points in their 28-18 pre-season friendly victory over the Salford Red Devils.

On 22 April 2022, it was announced that Hardaker had left Wigan with immediate effect, to return to his family base in Yorkshire, and pursue other opportunities close to home, after he was dropped from the team, for the Easter weekend fixtures against St Helens and Wakefield respectively.

On 27 April 2022, Hardaker rejoined Leeds Rhinos until the end of the season, and was selected in the 21 man squad to face Hull KR on 29 April. However, on 28 April, it was reported that Hardaker had collapsed, and suffered a seizure whilst out on a walk with his son, and was taken to hospital in Wakefield as a precaution, before being discharged. Due to health and safety reasons, he did not play.

== Background ==
Hardaker was born in Pontefract, West Yorkshire, England.

== Playing career ==
=== Featherstone Rovers ===
Hardaker joined Featherstone Rovers from the local amateur side Featherstone Lions after leaving Carleton High School in Pontefract. He previously played for his hometown club Knottingley Rockware before signing professional terms with Featherstone Rovers.

He scored a hat-trick of tries on his 2010 début for Featherstone Rovers against Hunslet, and went on to score 22 tries in 14 games in all competitions in his début season. This included two tries in Featherstone Rovers' extra-time 22–23 defeat by Halifax in the Co-operative Grand Final.

At the end of the season he was named joint Co-operative Championship Young Player of the Year, along with Gareth Moore of Batley Bulldogs.

=== Leeds ===
Hardaker signed for Leeds in October 2010 for a transfer fee of around £60,000 and was awarded the number 27 jersey. He trained with the Rhinos senior squad during pre-season and made two appearances in pre-season friendlies, before returning to Featherstone Rovers on a dual contract for the 2011 season. He made five further appearances for Featherstone, scoring five tries.

In March 2011, due to injuries to Leeds wingers Ben Jones-Bishop & Lee Smith, Hardaker was called back to the club & made his Super League début against St Helens at Headingley. Hardaker scored a try in Leeds' 30–16 loss. Hardaker then featured sporadically for Leeds throughout the season; arguably his best match was in the playoff game against Huddersfield, in which he scored a hat-trick and picked up the man of the match award in a 34–28 victory.

He also scored the final try in the 2011 Super League Grand Final as Leeds defeated St Helens 32–16 at Old Trafford, Manchester.

Hardaker was handed the number 4 jersey for the 2012 season, taking over from long-time servant Keith Senior. However, following an injury to Brent Webb, he moved to fullback for the latter half of the season and showed excellent form as Leeds successfully defended their Super League title. Hardaker was awarded the 2012 Super League Young Player of the Year.

He played in the 2012 Challenge Cup Final defeat by the Warrington Wolves at Wembley Stadium.

He played in the 2012 Super League Grand Final victory over Warrington at Old Trafford.

At the start of 2013, Hardaker suffered a broken thumb in a 42–14 victory for Leeds over Salford, causing him to miss the 2013 World Club Challenge match against Melbourne Storm.

Hardaker was part of the Leeds squad that won the 2014 Challenge Cup Final with victory over Castleford at Wembley Stadium.

He earned his first selection in the Super League Dream Team at the end of the season. His form also saw him earn a recall to the England squad for the 2014 Four Nations, however, he did not feature in the tournament.

Hardaker's form continued in 2015, and he was part of the Leeds squad that won the 2015 Challenge Cup, with victory over Hull Kingston Rovers at Wembley Stadium.

At the end of the season, he was named Man of Steel, the first Leeds player to win the award since Iestyn Harris in 1998.

He played in the 2015 Super League Grand Final victory over the Wigan Warriors at Old Trafford.

In June 2016, Hardaker requested a transfer from Leeds following the clubs poor form which saw them sitting bottom of the league table.

==== Penrith (loan) ====
On 23 June 2016 Hardaker signed for the NRL team Penrith on loan for the remainder of the 2016 season in a swap for James Segeyaro.

He débuted for the Penrith club in Round 17 against the West Tigers in the Penrith's 26–34 loss. Three weeks later, he scored his first career NRL try in Round 20 in the Penrith's 31–12 win over the Brisbane Broncos at Lang Park on 22 July. Zak played with Penrith all the way to the semi-finals where the clubs 2016 NRL season ended. He finished off his maiden year in the NRL playing in 11 games for the Penrith Panthers (including two finals games), scoring one try and assisting three others.

=== Castleford ===
On 8 November 2016, it was announced that he had signed a one-year loan deal to play for Castleford, with a deal in place for Castleford to sign him for an "already agreed fee" should all parties agree to it at the end of his loan agreement. At the end of the Warrington Wolves v Castleford Tigers match on 24 February 2017, Zak donated his man of the match cheque to the Prince of Wales Hospice in Pontefract.

On 27 June 2017, it was announced that he had joined Castleford on a permanent basis, signing a four-and-a-half-year contract with the club. A transfer fee of £150,000 was agreed between all parties.

His contract was terminated by Castleford on 21 February 2018 following his suspension in September 2017 for drug offences.

=== Wigan ===
On 18 May 2018, it was announced that he had joined Wigan on a four-year contract commencing upon completion of his suspension from the sport. He made his debut for the team in Wigan's pre-season friendly against the Salford Red Devils on 20 January 2019, scoring 12-points in the 28–18 victory.

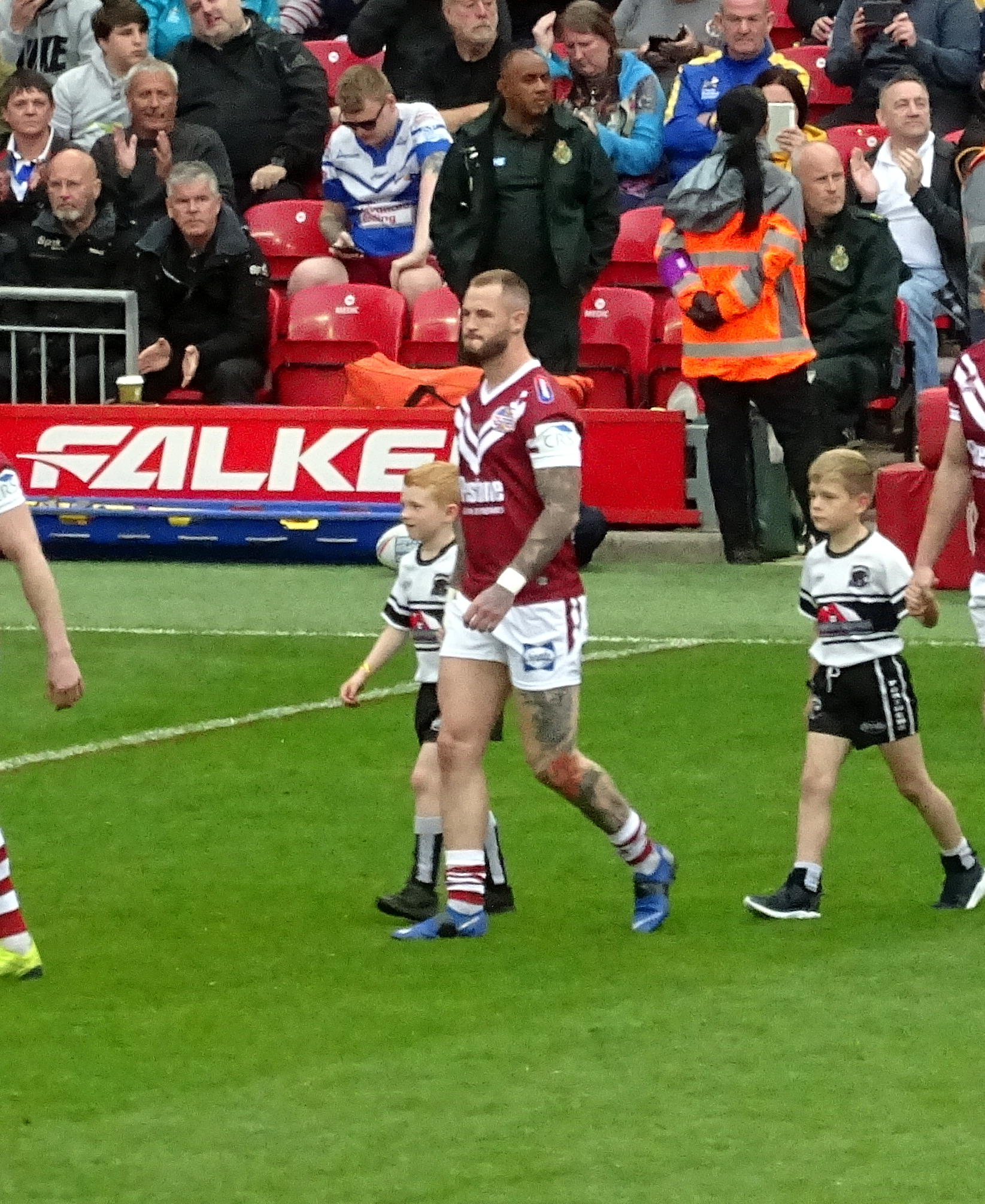
Hardaker walking out for the Wigan Warriors at Anfield in 2019

Hardaker played in the 2020 Super League Grand Final for Wigan which the club lost 8–4. With less than a minute to go in the game with the scores at 4-4, Hardaker had a penalty goal attempt from 40 yards out to win the game for Wigan. Hardaker missed the conversion and St Helens went down the other end to score the match winning try on the full-time siren.

In round 8 of the 2021 Super League season, Hardaker was sent off and later suspended for two matches after headbutting Catalans Dragons player Sam Tomkins in Wigan's 48–0 loss. On 21 April 2022 Hardaker was sacked by Wigan for disciplinary issues.

=== Leeds ===
On 26 April 2022, it was announced that Hardaker had rejoined Leeds for the remainder of the 2022 Super League season. On 24 September 2022, Hardaker played for Leeds in their 24–12 loss to St Helens RFC in the 2022 Super League Grand Final.

=== Leigh ===
On 20 October 2022, Hardaker signed a contract to join the newly promoted Leigh side. The move was seen as controversial due to Hardaker leaving Wigan only months earlier citing homesickness and travel time between where the club was located and its proximity to Yorkshire. On 12 August 2023, Hardaker played for Leigh in their 17-16 Challenge Cup final victory over Hull Kingston Rovers. Hardaker played 23 games for Leigh in the 2023 Super League season as the club finished fifth on the table and qualified for the playoffs. Hardaker played in their elimination playoff loss against Hull Kington Rovers. In July 2024, Hull F.C. announced that Hardaker would join the club from the start of the 2025 season on a two-year contract. Hardaker played 25 games for Leigh in the 2024 Super League season which saw the club finish fifth on the table. Hardaker played in the clubs semi-final loss to Wigan.

=== Hull F.C. ===
On 8 July 2024 it was reported that he had signed for Hull F.C. in the Super League on a two-year deal. In round 1 of the 2025 Super League season, Hardaker made his club debut for Hull F.C. in their upset victory over Catalans Dragons.

=== York Knights ===
On 8 September 2026 it was reported that he had signed for York Knights in the Super League on a 2-year deal.

== International career ==
In 2012, Hardaker made his England début at fullback at the end of the season in the 2012 Autumn International Series on 27 October 2012 v Wales.

Hardaker was named in England's squad for the 2013 Rugby League World Cup; however, he was later forced to withdraw from the squad for personal reasons mid-tournament.

In 2015, Zak made his first appearance for England since the 2012 Autumn International Series. He appeared for England in a test match against France where the English went on to destroy the away team. He was also selected for the test series against New Zealand which started a week later.

He was selected in squad for the 2019 Great Britain Lions tour of the Southern Hemisphere. He made his Great Britain test debut in the defeat by Tonga.

== Honours ==
=== Leeds Rhinos ===
- Super League (3): 2011, 2012, 2015
- League Leader's Shield (1): 2015
- Challenge Cup (2): 2014, 2015
- World Club Challenge (1): 2012

=== Castleford Tigers ===
- League Leader's Shield (1): 2017

=== Wigan Warriors ===
- League Leader's Shield (1): 2020

=== Leigh Leopards ===
- Challenge Cup (1): 2023

=== International ===
- Baskerville Shield (1): 2015

=== Individual ===
- Super League Dream Team (3): 2014, 2015, 2017
- Man of Steel (1): 2015

== Controversies ==
In November 2013, Hardaker withdrew from the England squad during the 2013 Rugby League World Cup, citing personal reasons. He was later handed a £2,500 fine and a written warning by his club Leeds Rhinos after he "acted unprofessionally" prior to his withdrawal from the squad.

In June 2014, Hardaker received a five-match ban and a £300 fine for making homophobic comments which appeared to be directed towards referee James Child. Hardaker issued a public apology for the incident, claiming the insult had been directed towards Warrington Wolves player Michael Monaghan rather than the referee.

In March 2015, Hardaker and Leeds teammate Elliot Minchella were detained and questioned by police over the alleged assault of a 22-year-old student, causing Hardaker to miss his side's 18–6 defeat by Warrington Wolves. Hardaker did not face criminal charges, but admitted to the assault and agreed to pay £200 compensation and write a letter of apology to the victim. He was also once again subject to internal disciplinary action by his club.

In October 2017, Hardaker was omitted from Castleford Tigers squad for the 2017 Super League Grand Final against former club Leeds. Castleford issued a statement saying that Hardaker had been left out for an unspecified "breach of club rules". On 9 October 2017, Castleford released a statement confirming Hardaker had received a suspension after testing positive for a banned substance. It was also announced that Hardaker would not be selected for the England squad for the 2017 Rugby League World Cup after testing positive for cocaine.

In September 2018, Hardaker was arrested for allegedly drink driving, driving without insurance, and driving without a valid MOT. He was banned from driving in October 2018, having been found to be over double the legal limit.

In February 2024, Hardaker was again found guilty of driving over the prescribed limit of alcohol and driving without due care and attention. He was charged at Leeds Magistrates Court, and received a fine of £1346 along with a three-year driving ban. Leigh Leopards issued a club statement, committing their continued support to Hardaker following the incident.
