= Willie Isa =

NZ football coach & Samoa international rugby league footballer

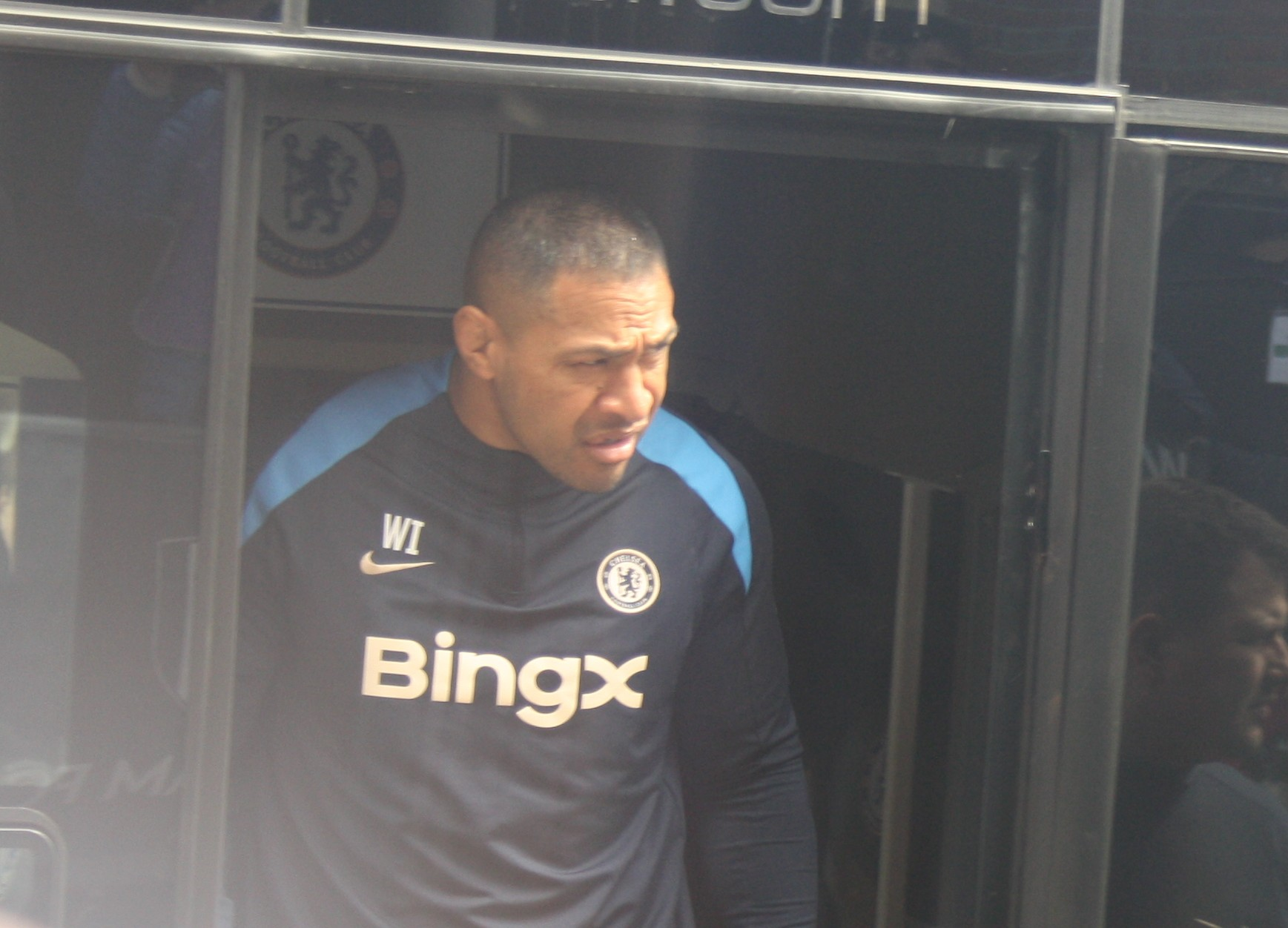
- Isa in 2025

Personal information
- Full name: William Isa
- Date of birth: 1 January 1989 (age 37)
- Place of birth: Auckland, New Zealand

Team information
- Current team: Chelsea (player support and development officer)

Willie Isa
Playing information
- Height: 5 ft 10 in (1.78 m)
- Weight: 15 st 4 lb (97 kg)
- Position: Second-row, Centre, Loose forward, Wing
Club
Years	Team	Pld	T	G	FG	P
2008	Penrith Panthers	1	0	0	0	0
2009–10	Melbourne Storm	5	2	0	0	8
2011	Castleford Tigers	11	6	0	0	24
2012–15	Widnes Vikings	87	4	0	0	16
2016–24	Wigan Warriors	209	17	0	0	68
	Total	313	29	0	0	116
Representative
Years	Team	Pld	T	G	FG	P
2010	Samoa	1	0	0	0	0

William "Willie" Isa (born 1 January 1989) is a professional association football coach and former rugby league football player who played as a second-row, centre, winger or loose forward. He is the player support and development officer of Premier League club Chelsea.

A former Samoa international, Isa played for Penrith Panthers and Melbourne Storm in the National Rugby League, and the Castleford Tigers, Widnes Vikings, and Wigan Warriors in the Super League.

In January 2025, influenced by medical issues, Isa announced his retirement from professional rugby league football with immediate effect. The following month, he joined the coaching staff at association football club Chelsea.

== Background ==
Isa was born in Auckland, New Zealand to Samoan parents, and moved to Sydney, New South Wales, Australia as a one-year-old. Isa was educated at St Dominic's College, Penrith.

He played his junior rugby league for the St Mary's Saints, before being signed by the Penrith Panthers.

== Career ==
=== Rugby league football ===
Isa previously played one NRL match for the Penrith Panthers, called up unexpectedly at half-time in a NYC game to replace an injured player.

Isa was signed by Melbourne Storm for the 2009 NRL season and he was compared to the Storm's former star player, Israel Folau.

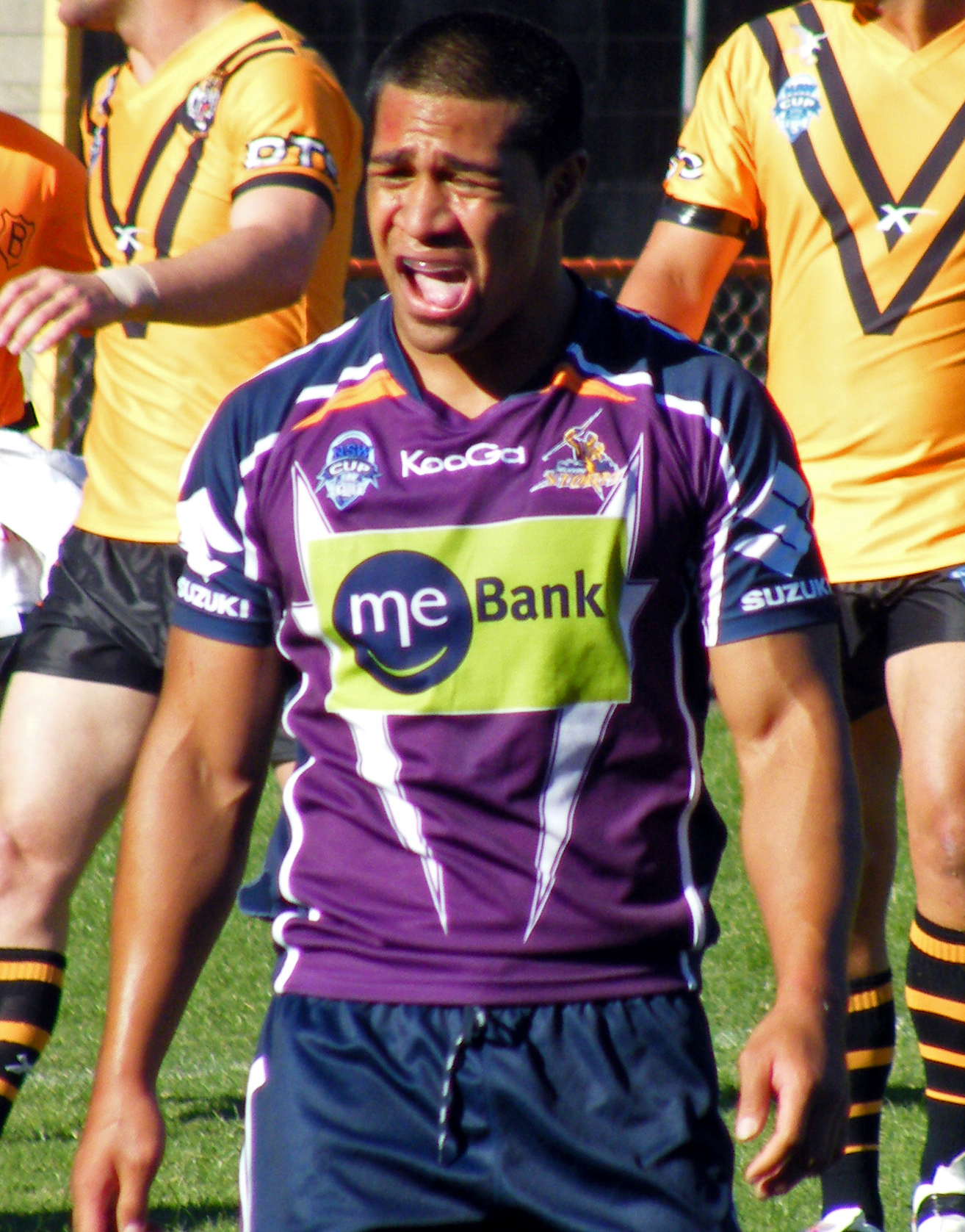
Isa playing for Melbourne in 2010

He was selected in the Samoan squad in 2010.

On 16 December 2010, it was announced that Isa had signed for Castleford Tigers on a 12-month contract, Castleford coach Terry Matterson referred to this signing as being similar to that of Rangi Chase.

Isa signed for Widnes Vikings for the 2012 season. He scored his first (and second) Widnes try against Hull F.C. in a 42–16 win.

In 2013, Isa found a new position, that position of second row transformed him into one of the form players of the Super League. On 16 May 2014, Isa was the ninth player in as many weeks to sign a new contract and stay with the Vikings. He signed a new two-year deal.

On 29 September 2015, it was announced that Isa had signed a two-year contract with an option for a third year with Wigan Warriors, starting in 2016.

Isa played in the 2016 Super League Grand Final victory over the Warrington Wolves at Old Trafford.

Isa played in the 2017 Challenge Cup Final defeat by Hull at Wembley.

Isa played in the 2020 Super League Grand Final which Wigan lost 8–4 against St Helens R.F.C.

In round 20 of the 2021 Super League season, Isa was sent to the sin bin and placed on report for another incident in Wigan's 26–2 loss against St Helens.

Isa played 22 games for Wigan in the 2022 Super League season. Isa did not feature in the clubs 2022 Challenge Cup Final victory over Huddersfield Giants.

On 14 October 2023, Isa played in Wigan's 2023 Super League Grand Final victory over the Catalans Dragons. In the post match celebrations, Sky Sports presenter Brian Carney described Isa as a "junkyard dog".

On 24 February 2024, Isa played in Wigan's 2024 World Club Challenge final victory over Penrith Panthers. In October, he signed a one-year contract extension with Wigan. However, on 23 January 2025, Isa announced his retirement from professional rugby league to pursue an offered opportunity.

=== Association football coach ===
Upon retiring, Isa switched codes to join the coaching staff of association football club Chelsea as player support and development officer. Following Albert Brough, Isa is the second professional sportsman to switch between rugby league and association football.

== Honours ==
=== Melbourne Storm ===
- NRL
  - Winners (1): 2009
- World Club Challenge
  - Winners (1): 2010

NB: Both these honours were stripped from Melbourne due to the Melbourne Storm salary cap breach

=== Wigan Warriors ===
- Super League
  - Winners (4): 2016, 2018, 2023, 2024
- League Leaders' Shield
  - Winners (3): 2020, 2023, 2024
- Challenge Cup
  - Winners (1): 2022
- World Club Challenge
  - Winners (2): 2017, 2024
