= Callum Field =

English rugby league footballer

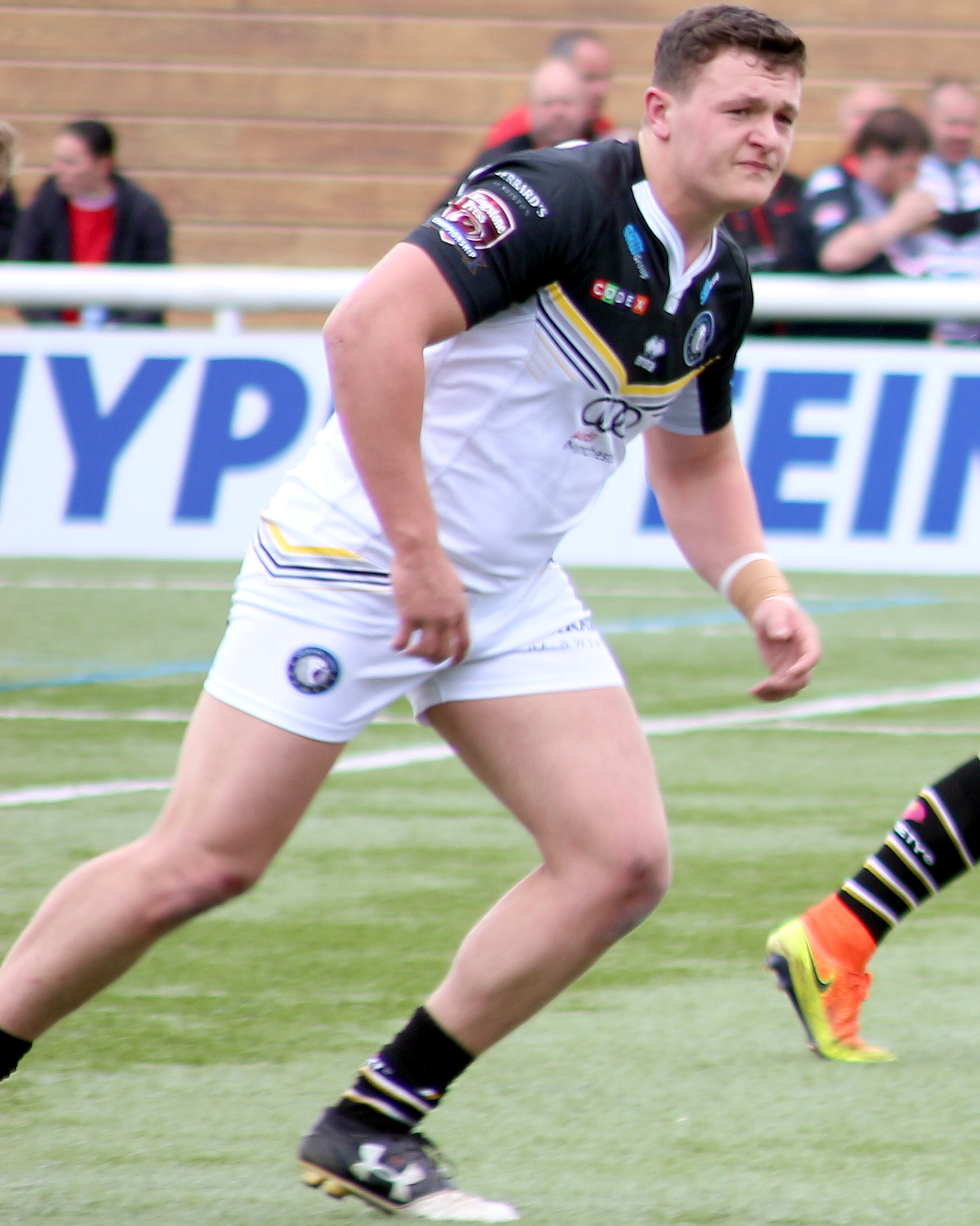

Personal information
- Born: 7 October 1997 (age 28) Pontefract, West Yorkshire, England
- Height: 6 ft 0 in (1.83 m)
- Weight: 15 st 8 lb (99 kg)

Playing information
- Position: Second-row, Centre
Club
Years	Team	Pld	T	G	FG	P
2017–19	Wigan Warriors	10	0	0	0	0
2017(loan)	→ Swinton Lions	3	0	0	0	0
2018(loan)	→ London Skolars	2	1	0	0	4
2018(loan)	→ Swinton Lions	1	0	0	0	0
2019(loan)	→ Dewsbury Rams	13	0	0	0	0
2020	Leigh Centurions	0	0	0	0	0
2021–22	Featherstone Rovers	30	4	0	0	16
2022(loan)	→ Newcastle Thunder	1	0	0	0	0
2022–	Widnes Vikings	47	4	0	0	16
	Total	107	9	0	0	36
- Source: As of 28 November 2024

Callum Field (born 7 October 1997) is an English professional rugby league footballer who plays as a second-row forward or centre for Widnes Vikings in the Championship.

== Background ==
Field was born in Pontefract, West Yorkshire, England.

== Career ==
=== Wigan Warriors ===
He has previously played for the Wigan Warriors in the Super League and spent time on loan from Wigan at the Swinton Lions and the Dewsbury Rams in the Championship, and the London Skolars in Betfred League 1.

In 2017 he made his professional début for the Swinton Lions against the London Broncos.

=== Leigh Centurions ===
On 5 November 2019 it was announced that Field would join Leigh Centurions.

=== Featherstone Rovers ===
In December 2020 it was announced that Field had signed for Featherstone Rovers for the 2021 season.

=== Widnes Vikings ===
On 9 May 2022 it was announced that Field had signed for Widnes Vikings on-loan for the 2022 season In October 2022 he signed a two-year deal with the club.
