= James Worthington (rugby league) =

English professional Rugby League player

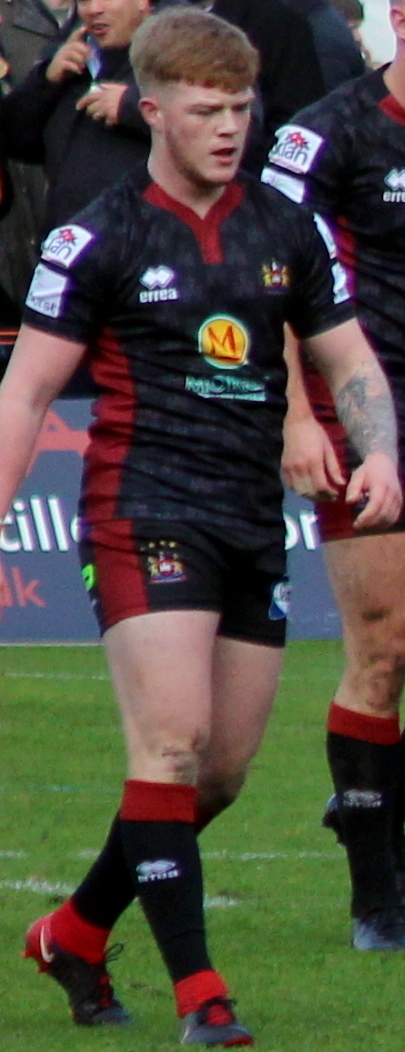

Personal information
- Born: 21 May 1999 (age 26) Wigan, Greater Manchester, England
- Height: 5 ft 10 in (1.77 m)
- Weight: 13 st 12 lb (88 kg)

Playing information
- Position: Fullback, Centre
Club
Years	Team	Pld	T	G	FG	P
2017–19	Wigan Warriors	1	2	0	0	8
2018(loan)	→ Swinton Lions	1	0	0	0	0
2018(loan)	→ Toulouse Olympique	3	2	0	0	8
2018(loan)	→ London Skolars	1	0	0	0	0
2019(loan)	→ Workington Town	6	2	0	0	8
2019(loan)	→ Rochdale Hornets	8	0	0	0	0
2020	Oldham Roughyeds	5	3	0	0	12
2021	Whitehaven	4	2	0	0	8
	Total	29	11	0	0	44
- Source: As of 21 December 2023

James Worthington (born 21 May 1999) is an English professional rugby league footballer who most recently played as a fullback or centre for Whitehaven in League 1.

He has played for the Wigan Warriors in the Super League and spent time on loan from Wigan at the Swinton Lions, Toulouse Olympique and the Rochdale Hornets in the Championship, and the London Skolars and Workington Town in League 1.

== Background ==
Worthington was born in Wigan, Greater Manchester, England.

== Career ==
In 2017 he made his Wigan Super League début against Wakefield Trinity. Whilst scoring two tries and receiving man of the match. He spent one season at Oldham RLFC after leaving Wigan, and prior to joining Whitehaven RLFC.

=== Whitehaven ===
On 10 February 2021 it was reported that he had signed for Whitehaven in RFL League 1. After a single season with the Cumbrian club, Worthington left the professional game to join amateur side, Wigan St Judes.
