= Josh Woods (rugby league) =

English rugby league footballer (born 1997)

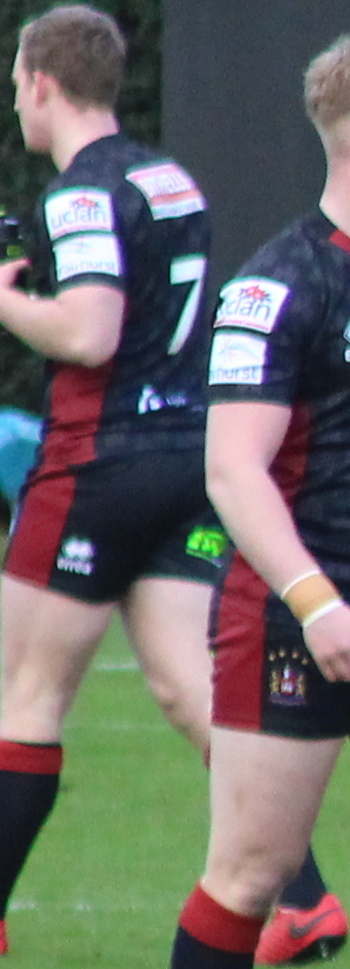

Personal information
- Full name: Joshua Woods
- Born: 13 December 1997 (age 28) Leigh, Greater Manchester, England
- Height: 6 ft 0 in (1.83 m)
- Weight: 13 st 12 lb (88 kg)

Playing information
- Position: Stand-off, Scrum-half
Club
Years	Team	Pld	T	G	FG	P
2017–20	Wigan Warriors	13	2	4	1	17
2017(loan)	→ Swinton Lions	6	0	0	1	1
2018(loan)	→ Swinton Lions	12	1	3	2	12
2019(loan)	→ Leigh Centurions	25	3	10	1	33
2020(loan)	→ Leigh Centurions	4	2	0	1	9
2021–22	Newcastle Thunder	38	2	12	4	36
2023–	Batley Bulldogs	88	7	138	9	313
	Total	186	17	167	19	421
- Source: As of 4 January 2023

Josh Woods (born 13 December 1997) is an English professional rugby league footballer who plays as a scrum-half or stand-off for the Batley Bulldogs in the Championship.

== Background ==
Woods was born in Leigh, Greater Manchester, England.

== Career ==
=== Wigan Warriors ===
He played for the Wigan Warriors in the Super League, but spent the 2019 and 2020 seasons on loan at the Leigh Centurions.

In 2017 he made his Wigan Super League début against the Salford Red Devils.

=== Newcastle Thunder ===
On 21 December 2020 it was announced that Woods would join the Newcastle Thunder for the 2021 season.

=== Batley Bulldogs ===
On 4 November 2022 it was announced that Woods would join the Batley Bulldogs for the 2023 season.
