= 2023 Hull Kingston Rovers season =

English rugby league team season

Hull Kingston Rovers 2023 season
- 2023 Super League season Rank: 4th
- Play-off result: Semi-finals
- Challenge Cup: Runners-up
- 2023 record: Wins: 20; draws: 0; losses: 13
- Points scored: For: 589; against: 498

Team information
- Chairman: Neil Hudgell
- Head Coach: Willie Peters
- Captain: Shaun Kenny-Dowall
- Stadium: Craven Park
- Avg. attendance: 8,770
- High attendance: 10,050; Hull F.C., 9 July
- Low attendance: 8,013; Leigh Leopards, 25 August

Top scorers
- Tries: Ryan Hall (14)
- Goals: Brad Schneider (31)
- Points: Brad Schneider (83)
Home colours	Away colours	Third colours
← 2022	List of seasons	2024 →

The 2023 season was Hull Kingston Rovers' seventh consecutive season playing in England's top division of rugby league. During the season, they competed in the 2023 Super League season and the 2023 Challenge Cup.

Prior to the sacking of Tony Smith as head coach on 4 July 2022 and resultant temporary appointment of Danny McGuire for the rest of the 2022 season, Hull Kingston Rovers announced in May 2022 the appointment of former South Sydney Rabbitohs halfback and Newcastle Knights assistant coach Willie Peters as the team's head coach for the 2023 season in a three-year deal.

== Preseason friendlies ==
Date and time	Versus	H/A	Venue	Result	Score	Tries	Goals	Attendance	Report
20 January; 17:45 (Note: Craig Hall's testimonial match)	Featherstone Rovers	A	Post Office Road	L	0–28			2,976	
5 February, 15:00	Leeds Rhinos	H	Craven Park	W	26–4	R. Hall (2), Opacic, Ryan, Litten	Coote (1/2), Dagger (1/2)		

== Super League ==
=== Fixtures ===
Date and time	Round	Versus	H/A	Venue	Result	Score	Tries	Goals	Attendance	TV	Pos.	Report
18 February; 13:00	Round 1	Wigan Warriors	H	Craven Park	W	27–18	Kenny-Dowall (3), R. Hall, Linnett	Coote (3/4), Lewis (0/2); Drop-goals: Abdull	10,029	Channel 4	4th	
23 February; 20:00	Round 2	Salford Red Devils	A	AJ Bell Stadium	W	24–10	Wood (2), Ryan, Halton	Dagger (4/4)	5,565	Sky Sports	1st (Note: This match marked the first time Hull Kingston Rovers had topped the Super League table since the 2008 season.)	
3 March; 20:00	Round 3	Leigh Leopards	H	Craven Park	L	25–30	Kenny-Dowall, Lewis, Batchelor, Abdull	Dagger (4/4); Drop-goals: Abdull	8,448	Sky Sports	3rd	
10 March; 20:00	Round 4	Warrington Wolves	H	Craven Park	L	10–18	Halton (2)	Coote (1/2)	8,082	Sky Sports	4th	
18 March; 18:00 (GMT)	Round 5	Catalans Dragons	A	Stade Gilbert Brutus	L	12–26	Milnes, R. Hall	Lewis (2/2)	7,682	Sky Sports	7th	
24 March; 20:00	Round 6	Wakefield Trinity	A	Belle Vue	W	34–6	Opacic (2), Wood, Senior, Linnett, Lewis, Minchella	Lewis (0/3), Coote (3/4)	4,705	Sky Sports	7th	
31 March; 20:00	Round 7	Leeds Rhinos	H	Craven Park	W	20–12	Senior, Sue, Linnett	Coote (4/5)	8,512	Sky Sports Arena	5th	
7 April; 12:30 (Good Friday)	Round 8 (Rivals Round)	Hull F.C.	A	MKM Stadium	W	40–0	R. Hall (3), Opacic, Batchelor, Coote, Lewis	Coote (6/8)	20,985	Sky Sports Arena	4th	
14 April; 20:00	Round 9	St Helens	H	Craven Park	W	26–14	Lewis (2), Coote, Litten	Coote (5/5)	8,540	Sky Sports Arena	4th	
21 May; 20:00	Round 10	Castleford Tigers	A	The Jungle	W	12–7	C. Hall, Parcell	Coote (2/2)	7,110	Sky Sports Arena	3rd	
5 May; 20:00	Round 11	Huddersfield Giants	H	Craven Park	W	28–0	R. Hall (2), Batchelor, (2), Opacic	Milnes (4/7)	8,490	Sky Sports	3rd	
12 May; 20:00	Round 12	Warrington Wolves	A	Halliwell Jones Stadium	L	14–21	Ryan, Linnett	Lewis (3/3)	10,179	Sky Sports	3rd	
25 May; 20:00	Round 13	Wigan Warriors	H	Craven Park	L	22–26 (g.p.)	R. Hall, Parcell, Batchelor, Johnson	Lewis (3/4)	8,068	Sky Sports	3rd	
3 June; 13:30	Round 14 (Magic Weekend)	Salford Red Devils	N	St James' Park	L	16–26	Minchella, King, R. Hall	Coote (2/2), Lewis (0/1)	36,943 (Note: Attendance recorded across three fixtures.)	Sky Sports	5th	
10 June; 18:00 (BST)	Round 15	Catalans Dragons	A	Stade Gilbert Brutus	L	4–38	C. Hall	Lewis (0/1)	9,453	Sky Sports	7th	
23 June; 20:00	Round 16	Wakefield Trinity	H	Craven Park	W	28–12	Opacic (2), Senior (2), Lewis	Milnes (4/5)	8,185	Sky Sports	7th	
30 June; 20:00	Round 17	Leigh Leopards	A	Leigh Sports Village	L	4–34	Lewis	Milnes (0/1)	6,012	Sky Sports	7th	
9 July; 12:00	Round 18	Hull F.C.	H	Craven Park	L	6–16	Walker	Milnes (1/1)	10,050	Sky Sports	7th	
14 July; 20:00	Round 19	Leeds Rhinos	A	Headingley Rugby Stadium	W	19–18 (g.p.)	Schneider, Opacic, Senior	Milnes (2/3); Drop-goals: Schneider	13,728	Sky Sports	8th	
28 July; 20:00	Round 20	Castleford Tigers	H	Craven Park	W	34–16	Opacic, Kennedy, Linnett, Minchella, Batchelor, Ryan	Milnes (5/6 + 1 pen.)	8,636	Sky Sports	6th	
4 August; 20:00	Round 21	Wigan Warriors	A	DW Stadium	L	6–64	Walker	Milnes (1/1)	11,464	Sky Sports	5th	
18 August; 20:00	Round 22	St Helens	A	Totally Wicked Stadium	L	6–28	Lewis	Schneider (1/1)	11,258	Sky Sports	7th	
25 August; 20:00	Round 23	Leigh Leopards	H	Craven Park	W	52–10	R. Hall (2), Lewis (2), Linnett (2), Kenny-Dowall, Minchella, Senior, Litten	Schneider (8/11)	8,013	Sky Sports Action	7th	
1 September; 20:00	Round 24	Catalans Dragons	H	Craven Park	W	26–18	Kenny-Dowall, Linnett, Walker, Lewis	Schneider (5/5)	9,012	Sky Sports	6th	
8 September; 19:45	Round 25	Huddersfield Giants	A	Kirklees Stadium	W	26–18	Kenny-Dowall, Abdull, Linnett, Senior	Schneider (3/4 + 2 pen.)	4,628	Sky Sports	6th	
16 September; 19:30	Round 26	Salford Red Devils	H	Craven Park	W	12–0	Batchelor, R. Hall	Schneider (1/2 + 1 pen.)	9,848	Sky Sports	5th	
22 September; 20:00	Round 27	Wakefield Trinity	A	Belle Vue	W	56–12	Storton (2), Schneider (2), Litten (2), Walker, Lewis, Opacic, R. Hall	Schneider (8/11)	4,710	Sky Sports	4th	

=== Table ===
Pos	Team	Pld	W	D	L	PF	PA	PD	Pts	Qualification
1	Wigan Warriors (L, C)	27	20	0	7	722	360	+362	40	Qualification to Semi-finals
2	Catalans Dragons	27	20	0	7	722	420	+302	40	Qualification to Semi-finals
3	St. Helens	27	20	0	7	613	366	+247	40	Qualification to Eliminators
4	Hull Kingston Rovers	27	16	0	11	589	498	+91	32	Qualification to Eliminators
5	Leigh Leopards	27	16	0	11	585	508	+77	32	Qualification to Eliminators
6	Warrington Wolves	27	14	0	13	597	512	+85	28	Qualification to Eliminators
7	Salford Red Devils	27	13	0	14	494	512	−18	26	
8	Leeds Rhinos	27	12	0	15	535	534	+1	24	
9	Huddersfield Giants	27	11	0	16	473	552	−79	22	
10	Hull FC	27	10	0	17	476	654	−178	20	
11	Castleford Tigers	27	6	0	21	323	774	−451	12	
12	Wakefield Trinity (R)	27	4	0	23	303	742	−439	8	Relegation to Championship

Source: Super League
(C) Champions; (L) League Leaders' Shield Winners; (R) Relegated

=== Play-offs ===
Date and time	Round	Versus	H/A	Venue	Result	Score	Tries	Goals	Attendance	TV	Report
29 September; 20:00	Eliminators	Leigh Leopards	H	Craven Park	W	20–6	Walker, R. Hall, Luckley	Schneider (3/3 + 1 pen.)	9,305	Sky Sports Main Event	
7 October; 12:45	Semi-finals	Wigan Warriors	A	DW Stadium	L	12–42	Minchella, Litten	Schneider (2/2)	15,162	Sky Sports Arena; Channel 4	

== Challenge Cup ==
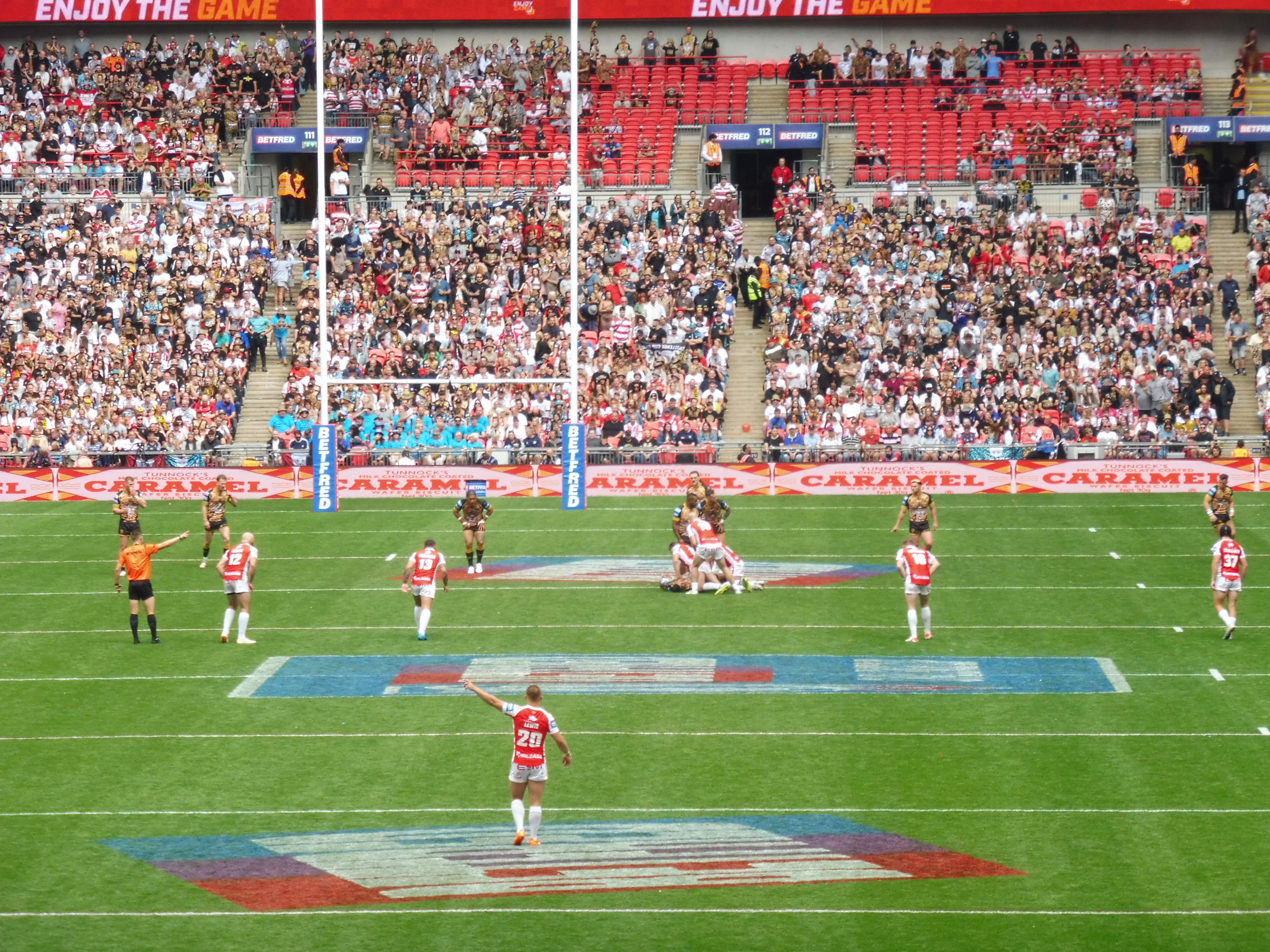
Hull Kingston Rovers in action against the Leigh Leopards at Wembley Stadium during the 2023 Challenge Cup Final

Hull Kingston Rovers were first drawn on 24 April to play the Batley Bulldogs at home in Round 6, confirmed following Batley's Round 5 34-16 victory against the Keighley Cougars the day prior. Following a 50-0 victory against Batley, Hull Kingston Rovers entered the quarter-finals and were drawn at home to the Salford Red Devils.

After winning 28-10 against Salford, Hull Kingston Rovers were drawn into the semi-finals against league leaders Wigan Warriors, to be played at the neutral Headingley Rugby Stadium. A contentious match saw Hull Kingston Rovers win the match in extra time on golden point rules with a drop goal by Brad Schneider, sending the club to the Challenge Cup final for the first time since their 50-0 defeat to Leeds Rhinos in the 2015 final.

Hull Kingston Rovers emerged as runners-up at Wembley Stadium against the Leigh Leopards, who won the match in extra time on golden point rules with a drop goal by Lachlan Lam. The 2023 final was the first time a Challenge Cup final had been held without either Leeds Rhinos, Wigan Warriors, Warrington Wolves or St Helens participating since 1986.

Date and time	Round	Versus	H/A	Venue	Result	Score	Tries	Goals	Attendance	TV	Report
19 May; 20:00	Round 6	Batley Bulldogs	H	Craven Park	W	50–0	Ryan (3), Linnett (2), Kenny-Dowall (2), Lewis, Luckley	Lewis (5/7), Wood (2/2)	5,143	Not televised	
17 June; 12:00	Quarter-finals	Salford Red Devils	H	Craven Park	W	28–10	R. Hall, Zenon, Linnett, Kenny-Dowall, Hadley	Milnes (4/5)	6,289	Viaplay Sports 1	
23 July; 17:00	Semi-finals	Wigan Warriors	N	Headingley Rugby Stadium	W	11–10 (g.p.)	Senior, Ryan	Schneider (1/2); Drop-goals: Schneider	10,926	BBC One	
12 August; 15:00	Final	Leigh Leopards	N	Wembley Stadium	L	16–17 (g.p.)	Litten, Parcell	Schneider (2/2 + 2 pen.)	58,213	BBC One	

== Transfers ==
=== Gains ===
Player	Club	Contract	Date
(Australia) Rhys Kennedy	Brisbane Broncos	2 Years	June 2022
(Ireland) Louis Senior	Huddersfield Giants	2 Years	July 2022
(Samoa) Sauaso Sue	Newcastle Knights	3 Years	July 2022
(Australia) Tom Opacic	Parramatta Eels	2 Years	August 2022
(England) James Batchelor	Wakefield Trinity	2 Years	August 2022
(Turkey) Yusuf Aydin	Wakefield Trinity	2 Years	August 2022
(Scotland) Sam Luckley	Salford Red Devils	2 Years	September 2022
(England) Corey Hall	Wakefield Trinity	2 Years	March 2023
(Australia) Brad Schneider	Canberra Raiders	End of season	July 2023

==== Loans in ====
Player	Club	Loan period	Date
(France) Tanguy Zenon	Catalans Dragons	Two weeks	June 2023
(France) Fouad Yaha	Catalans Dragons	Two weeks	June 2023
(France) César Rougé	Catalans Dragons	Two weeks	August 2023
(England) Isaac Shaw	Wakefield Trinity	Two weeks	August 2023
(Wales) Luke Thomas	Warrington Wolves	Two weeks	August 2023

=== Losses ===
Player	Club	Contract	Date
(Fiji) Korbin Sims	N/A	Retirement	August 2022
(Tonga) Albert Vete	Castleford Tigers	2 Years	September 2022
(England) Ben Crooks	Keighley Cougars	2 Years	September 2022
(England) Adam Rusling	Cornwall R.L.F.C.	1 Year	October 2022
(England) Tom Wilkinson	Dewsbury Rams	1 Year	October 2022
(England) Nathan Cullen	Cornwall R.L.F.C.	1 Year	October 2022
(England) Will Maher	Halifax Panthers	2 Years	October 2022
(England) Bailey Dawson	Castleford Tigers	1 Year	December 2022
(England) Charlie Cavanagh	N/A	Released	January 2023
(Cook Islands) Brad Takairangi	Dapto Canaries		January 2023
(England) Tom Garratt	N/A	Retirement	February 2023
(England) Will Dagger	Wakefield Trinity	1 Year	March 2023
(Scotland) Lachlan Coote	N/A	Retirement	June 2023

==== Loans out ====
Player	Club	Loan period	Date
(England) Greg Richards	Toulouse Olympique	End of season	January 2023
(England) Connor Barley	York Knights	End of season	March 2023
(Germany) Jimmy Keinhorst	Keighley Cougars	One week	March 2023
(Samoa) Phoenix Laulu-Togaga'e	Keighley Cougars	Two weeks	June 2023

== Squad ==
2023 Hull Kingston Rovers Squad
First team squad			Coaching staff
2 (Republic of Ireland) Ethan Ryan – WG, FB; 3 (Australia) Tom Opacic – CE; 4 (New Zealand) Shaun Kenny-Dowall (c) – CE, WG; 5 (England) Ryan Hall – WG; 7 (England) Jordan Abdull – SH; 8 (Samoa) Sauaso Sue – PR; 9 (Australia) Matt Parcell – HK; 10 (Republic of Ireland) George King – PR; 12 (Scotland) Kane Linnett – SR; 13 (England) Elliot Minchella – LF; 14 (England) Jez Litten – HK, SO; 15 (Australia) Rhys Kennedy – PR; 16 (England) James Batchelor – SR, CE	17 (England) Matty Storton – PR, SR, LF; 18 (Germany) Jimmy Keinhorst – CE, SR, WG; 20 (England) Mikey Lewis – SO, SH (gk); 21 (England) Rowan Milnes – SH (gk); 22 (England) Dean Hadley – PR, LF, SR; 23 (Republic of Ireland) Louis Senior – WG; 24 (Republic of Ireland) Sam Wood – WG, CE (gk); 25 (Jamaica) Luis Johnson – SR; 26 (Scotland) Sam Luckley – PR; 27 (Turkey) Yusuf Aydin – PR, LF; 29 (Samoa) Phoenix Laulu-Togaga'e – HB; 31 (England) Zach Fishwick – PR; 32 (England) Connor Barley – WG, CE	33 (England) Corey Hall – CE, WG; 34 (England) Jack Walker – FB; 35 (France) Tanguy Zenon – FB; 36 (France) Fouad Yaha – WG; 37 (Australia) Brad Schneider – SO, SH (gk); 38 (England) Lennie Ellis – SO; 39 (England) Leo Tennison – PR; 40 (England) Louix Gorman – CE	Head coach: (Australia) Willie Peters; Assistant coaches: (Australia) Brett Delaney; (England) David Hodgson; (England) Danny McGuire; Legend: (c) Captain(s); (vc) Vice-captain(s); (red card) = suspended; = injured; (gk) = Goal kicker; Updated: 10 October 2023; Source(s): First team line-up
