= 2024 Hull Kingston Rovers season =

English rugby league team season

Hull Kingston Rovers 2024 season
- 2024 Super League season Rank: 2nd
- Play-off result: Runners-up
- Challenge Cup: Semi-finals
- 2024 record: Wins: 24; draws: 0; losses: 9
- Points scored: For: 719; against: 326

Team information
- Chairman: Neil Hudgell
- Head Coach: Willie Peters
- Captain: Elliot Minchella
- Stadium: Craven Park
- Avg. attendance: 9,883 (Note: Hull Kingston Rovers have not published individual attendances for most home matches during 2024.)

Top scorers
- Tries: Mikey Lewis (19)
- Goals: Mikey Lewis (74)
- Points: Mikey Lewis (224)
← 2023	List of seasons	2025 →

The 2024 season was Hull Kingston Rovers' eighth consecutive season playing in England's top division of rugby league. During the season, they competed in the 2024 Super League and the 2024 Challenge Cup.

== Preseason friendlies ==
Date and time	Versus	H/A	Venue	Result	Score	Tries	Goals	Attendance	Report
28 January; 15:00	Sheffield Eagles	H	Craven Park	L	24–26	Gorman (2), Wallace, Ellis	Gorman (4/4)	Unknown	
4 February, 14:30 (Note: James Donaldson's testimonial match)	Leeds Rhinos	A	Headingley Rugby Stadium	L	16–26	Hiku, Whitbread, Gorman	Hiku (3/3)	5,000+	

== Super League ==
=== Fixtures ===
Date and time	Round	Versus	H/A	Venue	Result	Score	Tries	Goals	Attendance	TV (Note: Ahead of 2024, Sky Sports announced they would be broadcasting all Super League matches over the next three seasons. Exact TV channels can be sourced by using WayBack Machine on RugbyLeagueOnTV. NB Not all games were broadcast on Sky Sports TV (advertised as "Sky Sports Exclusives"), with the remainder being broadcast using their on demand services accessible online or via red button. These games were made available on Super League+, and a select few on the BBC. Further, games on Main Event were also broadcast on Action or Arena.)	Pos.	Report
17 February; 17:30	Round 1	Hull FC	A	MKM Stadium	W	22–0	Evalds (2), Tanginoa, Lewis, Parcell	Hiku (1/5)	10,170	Sky Sports Main Event	3rd	
22 February; 20:00	Round 2	Leeds Rhinos	H	Craven Park	W	22–12	Sue, Hall, Hiku	Litten (3/3 + 2 pen.)	Unknown	Sky Sports Main Event	4th	
2 March; 17:30	Round 3	Salford Red Devils	A	Salford Community Stadium	L	10–17	Hiku, Litten	Litten (1/2)	5,036	Sky Sports Action	5th	
7 March; 20:00	Round 4	Warrington Wolves	H	Craven Park	L	20–22	May, Hall, Gildart, Opacic	Litten (2/4)	Unknown	Sky Sports Action	7th	
14 March; 20:00	Round 5	Huddersfield Giants	A	Kirklees Stadium	W	24–12	Hiku (2), Burgess, Litten, Hall	Litten (2/5)	5,428	Sky Sports Arena	5th	
29 March; 12:30 (Good Friday)	Round 6 (Rivals Round)	Hull FC	H	Craven Park	W	34–10	Burgess (2), Evalds, Lewis, Batchelor, Hiku, Tanginoa	Litten (2/6), Lewis (1/1)	Unknown	Sky Sports Main Event	5th	
5 April; 20:00	Round 7	London Broncos	H	Craven Park	W	50–10	Parcell (3), Batchelor (2), Tanginoa, Hall, Lewis, Hiku	Lewis (7/9)	Unknown	Sky Sports Mix	3rd	
20 April; 17:30 (GMT)	Round 8	Catalans Dragons	A	Stade Gilbert Brutus	L	6–36	Burgess	Reynolds (1/1)	8,583	Sky Sports Action	4th	
26 April; 20:00	Round 9	Wigan Warriors	H	Craven Park	W	26–10	Sue, Gildart, Hiku, Hall, Tanginoa	Lewis (3/5 + 1 pen.)	Unknown	Sky Sports Action	4th	
4 May; 15:00	Round 10	St Helens	H	Craven Park	W	40–20	May, Lewis, Broadbent, Hiku, Litten, Hadley, Hall	Lewis (6/7)	Unknown	Sky Sports Action	4th	
9 May; 20:00	Round 11	Warrington Wolves	A	Halliwell Jones Stadium	W	8–20	Broadbent, Lewis	Lewis (0/2)	8,578	Sky Sports Arena	4th	
26 May; 15:00	Round 12	London Broncos	A	Plough Lane	W	64–14	Broadbent (2), Evalds (2), Luckley (2), Lewis (2), Hiku, Parcell, Hadley	Lewis (9/10), Richardson (1/1)	3,750	Sky Sports Arena	3rd	
1 June; 17:30	Round 13	Leigh Leopards	H	Craven Park	W	12–0	Opacic, Evalds	Lewis (2/2)	Unknown	Sky Sports Arena	3rd	
14 June; 20:00	Round 14	Huddersfield Giants	H	Craven Park	W	32–6	Hiku (2), Hall (2), May, Parcell	Lewis (4/6)	9,304	Sky Sports Mix	3rd	
20 June; 20:00	Round 15	Castleford Tigers	A	The Jungle	W	13–12	Opacic, Minchella	Lewis (2/2); Drop-goals: Litten	7,897	Sky Sports Action	3rd	
6 July; 17:30	Round 16	Catalans Dragons	H	Craven Park	L	14–15 (g.p.)	Broadbent, Burgess	Lewis (2/2 + 1 pen.)	9,579	Sky Sports Action	4th	
13 July; 15:00	Round 17	Hull FC	A	MKM Stadium	W	24–10	Sue, Lewis, Storton, Minchella	Lewis (4/4)	15,392	Sky Sports Action	3rd	
20 July; 15:00	Round 18	Leeds Rhinos	A	Headingley Rugby Stadium	W	20–12	Hall, Lewis, Whitbread, Litten	Lewis (2/4)	14,555	Sky Sports Action	3rd	
26 July; 20:00	Round 19	London Broncos	H	Craven Park	W	40–16	Lewis (3), Sue, Hall, Parcell, Tanginoa	Richardson (6/7)	9,585	Sky Sports Arena	2nd	
2 August; 20:00	Round 20	Warrington Wolves	A	Halliwell Jones Stadium	W	22–4	Sue, May, Lewis, Hiku	Lewis (1/2), Litten (2/2)	12,102	Sky Sports Action	1st	
9 August; 20:00	Round 21	Castleford Tigers	H	Craven Park	W	36–6	Burgess (2), Hiku, Lewis, Hall, Evalds, May	Lewis (3/7 + 1 pen.)	Unknown	Sky Sports +	2nd	
18 August; 14:00	Round 22 (Magic Weekend)	Catalans Dragons	N	Elland Road	W	36–4	Minchella (2), Hall (2), Tanginoa (2), Hiku, Evalds	Lewis (2/8)	22,293	Sky Sports Action	1st	
24 August; 15:00	Round 23	St Helens	A	Totally Wicked Stadium	W	42–6	Burgess (4), Lewis, May, Tanginoa, Whitbread	Lewis (5/8)	13,588	Sky Sports Main Event	1st	
30 August; 20:00	Round 24	Salford Red Devils	H	Craven Park	W	32–12	Broadbent (2), Whitbread, Lewis, Opacic, Litten	Lewis (3/6 + 1 pen.)	9,694	Sky Sports Action	1st	
6 September; 20:00	Round 25	Wigan Warriors	A	Brick Community Stadium	L	20–24	Parcell, Lewis, Burgess	Lewis (2/3 + 2 pen.)	16,719	Sky Sports Main Event	2nd	
13 September; 20:00	Round 26	Leigh Leopards	A	Leigh Sports Village	W	24–0	Lewis (2) Hall, Sue	Lewis (3/4 + 1 pen.)	8,412	Sky Sports +	2nd	
20 September; 20:00	Round 27	Leeds Rhinos	H	Craven Park	W	26–16	Parcell, Hiku, Opacic, Sue, Burgess	Lewis (3/5)	Unknown	Sky Sports +	2nd	

=== Table ===
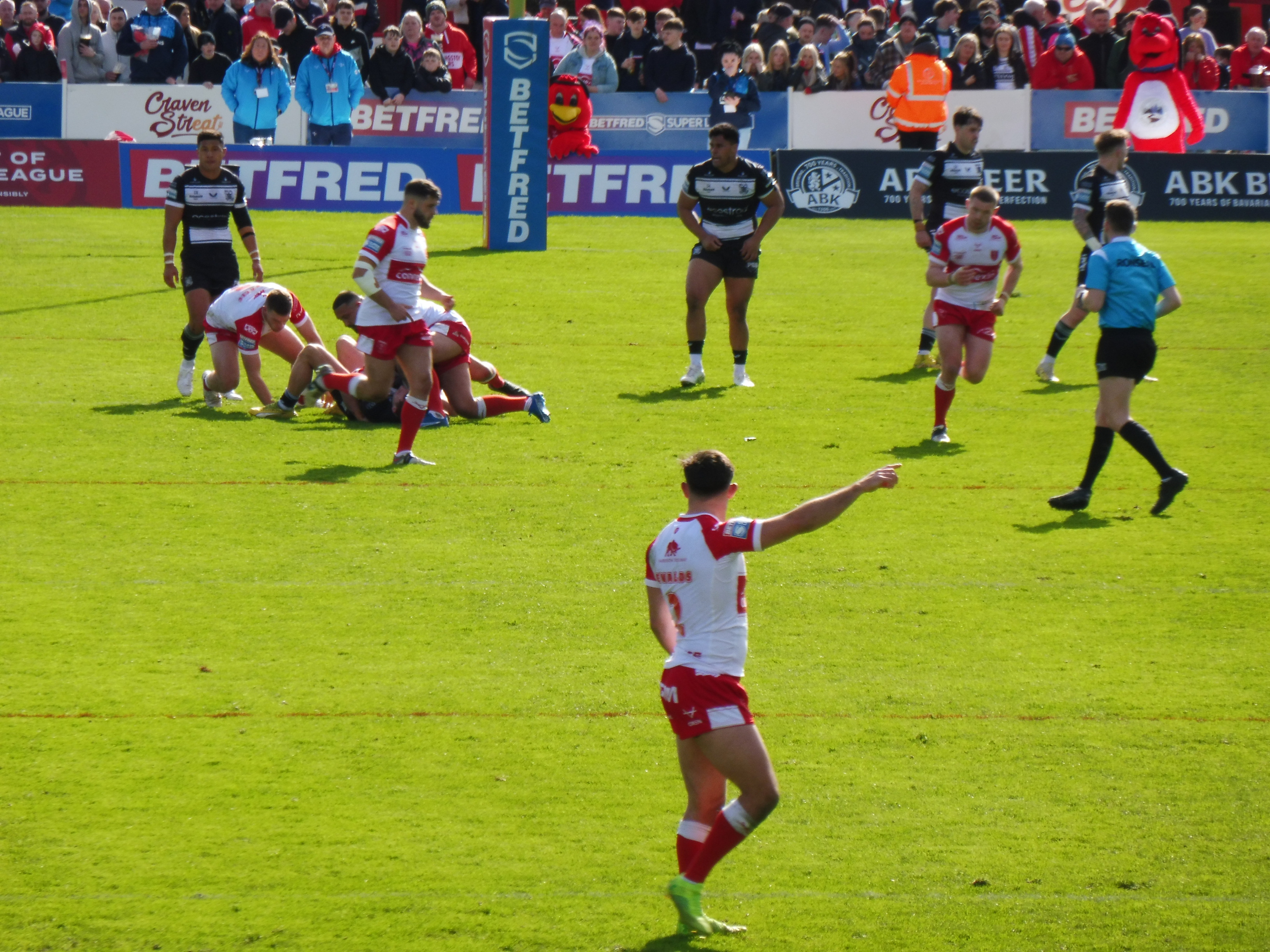
Hull KR playing against Hull FC at Sewell Group Craven Park during the second half of the 2024 Good Friday Derby

Pos	Team	Pld	W	D	L	PF	PA	PD	Pts	Qualification
1	Wigan Warriors (C)	27	22	0	5	723	338	+385	44	Advance to Semi-finals
2	Hull Kingston Rovers (Y)	27	21	0	6	719	326	+393	42	Advance to Semi-finals
3	Warrington Wolves	27	20	0	7	740	319	+421	40	Advance to Eliminators
4	Salford Red Devils	27	16	0	11	550	547	+3	32	Advance to Eliminators
5	Leigh Leopards	27	15	1	11	566	398	+168	31	Advance to Eliminators
6	St Helens	27	15	0	12	596	388	+208	30	Advance to Eliminators
7	Catalans Dragons	27	15	0	12	474	427	+47	30	
8	Leeds Rhinos	27	14	0	13	530	488	+42	28	
9	Huddersfield Giants	27	10	0	17	468	660	−192	20	
10	Castleford Tigers	27	7	1	19	425	735	−310	15	
11	Hull FC	27	3	0	24	328	894	−566	6	
12	London Broncos (R)	27	3	0	24	317	916	−599	6	Relegated to Championship

(C) Champions; (R) Relegated; (Y) Runners up

=== Play-offs ===
Date and time	Round	Versus	H/A	Venue	Result	Score	Tries	Goals	Attendance	TV	Report
4 October; 20:00	Semi-finals	Warrington Wolves	H	Craven Park	W	10–8	Batchelor, Burgess	Lewis (1/2)		Sky Sports +	
12 October, 18:00	Grand Final	Wigan Warriors	N	Old Trafford	L	2–9		Lewis (1 pen.)	68,173	Sky Sports Main Event	

== Challenge Cup ==
Date and time	Round	Versus	H/A	Venue	Result	Score	Tries	Goals	Attendance	TV	Report
22 March; 20:00	Round 6	Salford Red Devils	H	Craven Park	W	40–0	Hall (2), Burgess, Tanginoa, Hiku, Storton, Evalds	Litten (5/7 + 1 pen.), Batchelor (1/1)	Unknown	Not Televised	
13 April; 17:00	Quarter-finals	Leigh Leopards	H	Craven Park	W	26–14	Burgess (2), Tanginoa, Evalds, Minchella	Lewis (3/5)	Unknown	BBC Two	
18 May; 13:45	Semi-finals	Wigan Warriors	N	Eco-Power Stadium	L	6–38	Burgess	Lewis (1/1)	11,163	BBC One	

== Transfers ==
=== Gains ===
Player	Club	Contract	Date
(Jamaica) Ajahni Wallace	Bradford Bulls	2 Years	May 2023
(New Zealand) Peta Hiku	North Queensland Cowboys	3 Years	May 2023
(England) Oliver Gildart	Leigh Leopards	3 Years	June 2023
(Australia) Tyrone May	Catalans Dragons	2 Years	August 2023
(England) Niall Evalds	Castleford Tigers	2 Years	August 2023
(England) Neil Tchamambe	Leeds Rhinos	2 Years	October 2023
(Australia) Jai Whitbread	Wakefield Trinity		October 2023
(England) Reiss Butterworth	Dewsbury Rams	1 Year + 1 Year	October 2023
(Australia) Kelepi Tanginoa	Wakefield Trinity	3 Years	November 2023
(England) Joe Burgess	Salford Red Devils	1 Year	January 2024

=== Losses ===
Player	Club	Contract	Date
(New Zealand) Shaun Kenny-Dowall	N/A	Retirement	May 2023
(Australia) Brad Schneider	Penrith Panthers		September 2023
(England) Connor Moore	Saint-Gaudens Bears		September 2023
(England) Jack Walker	Hull FC	End of loan	September 2023
(England) Greg Richards	Toulouse Olympique	2 Years	September 2023
(Ireland) Ethan Ryan	Salford Red Devils	3 Years	October 2023
(England) Sam Wood	Castleford Tigers	3 Years	October 2023
(England) Rowan Milnes	Castleford Tigers	2 Years	October 2023
(Germany) Jimmy Keinhorst	York Knights	1 Year	October 2023
(Scotland) Kane Linnett	N/A	Retirement	November 2023
(Australia) Rhys Kennedy	London Broncos		November 2023
(England) Luis Johnson	Castleford Tigers	1 Year	December 2023
(England) Jordan Abdull	Catalans Dragons	Loan	January 2024

== Squad ==
2024 Hull Kingston Rovers Squad
First team squad			Coaching staff
1 (New Zealand) Peta Hiku – CE; 2 (England) Niall Evalds – FB; 3 (Australia) Tom Opacic – CE; 4 (England) Oliver Gildart – CE; 5 (England) Ryan Hall – WG; 7 (England) Mikey Lewis – SO (gk); 8 (Samoa) Sauaso Sue – PR; 9 (England) Jez Litten – HK (gk); 10 (Ireland) George King – PR; 11 (England) Dean Hadley – HK; 12 (England) James Batchelor – SR; 13 (England) Elliot Minchella (c) – SR	14 (Australia) Matt Parcell – HK; 15 (Scotland) Sam Luckley – PR; 16 (Australia) Jai Whitbread – LF; 17 (England) Matty Storton – SR; 18 (England) Ben Reynolds – HB; 20 (Australia) Kelepi Tanginoa – PR; 21 (England) Corey Hall – CE; 22 (Australia) Phoenix Laulu-Togaga'e – FB; 23 (Ireland) Louis Senior – WG; 24 (England) Reiss Butterworth – HK; 25 (England) Harvey Moore – CE; 26 (Jamaica) Ajahni Wallace – SR	27 (Australia) Tyrone May – HB; 28 (England) Zach Fishwick – PR; 29 (England) Louix Gorman – CE; 30 (England) Leo Tennison – PR; 31 (England) Lennie Ellis – HK; 32 (England) Connor Barley – CE; 33 (England) Harvey Horne – WG; 34 (England) Neil Tchamambe – WG; 35 (England) Joe Burgess – WG; 36 (England) Jack Broadbent – CE; 37 (England) Jack Brown – PR; 38 (England) Danny Richardson – SH	Head coach: (Australia) Willie Peters; Assistant coaches: (Australia) Brett Delaney; (England) Danny Ward; (New Zealand) Shaun Kenny-Dowall; Legend: (c) Captain(s); (vc) Vice-captain(s); (gk) = Goal kicker; Updated: 8 May 2024; Source(s): Hull KR announce 2024 squad numbers, First Team
