= 2025 Super League Grand Final =

Rugby league championship match

2025 Betfred Super League Grand Final
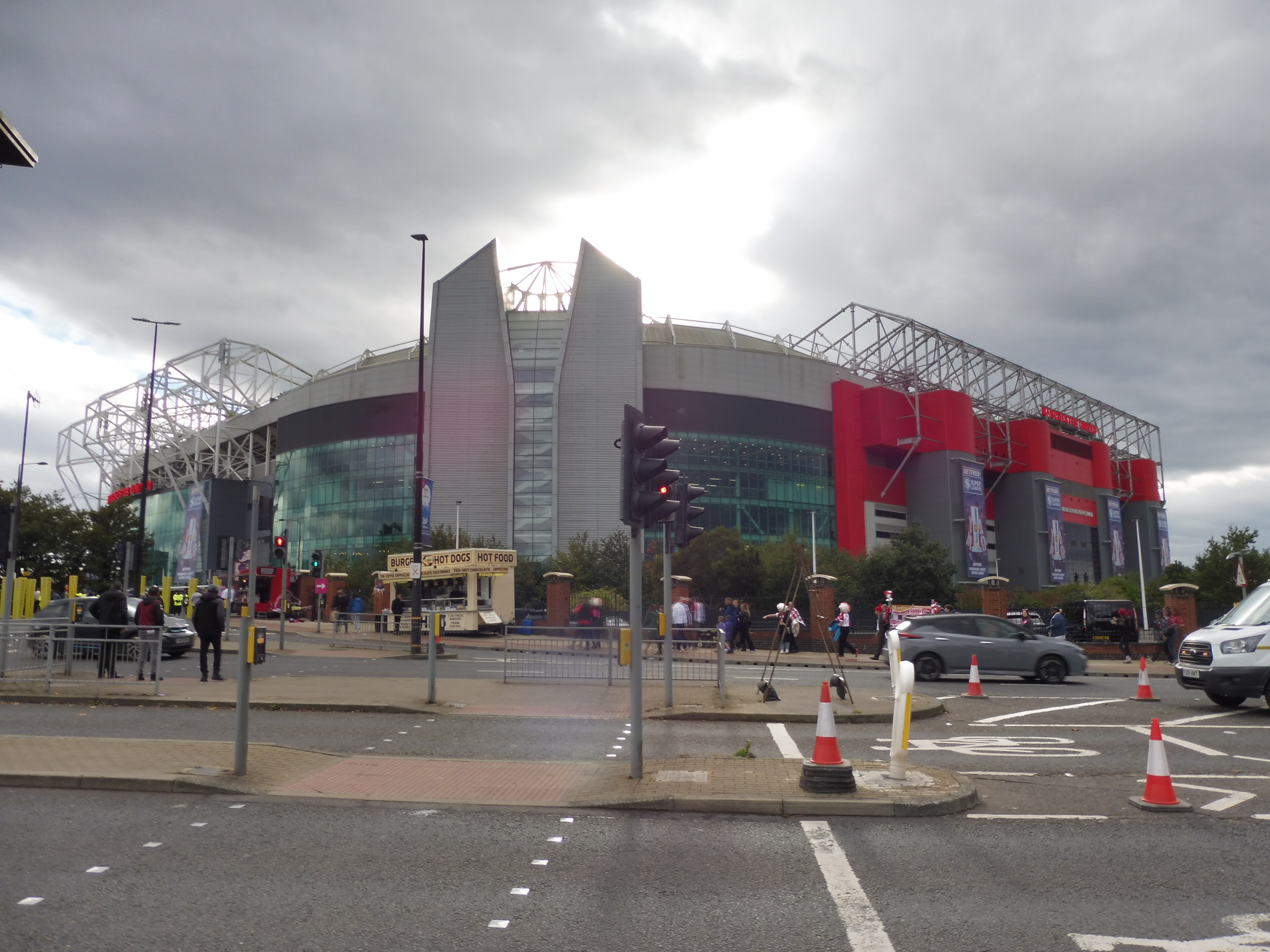
- The match took place at Old Trafford
Hull Kingston Rovers	Wigan Warriors
24	6
	1	2	Total
HKR	10	14	24
WIG	2	4	6
- Date: 11 October 2025
- Stadium: Old Trafford
- Location: Manchester, England
- Rob Burrow Award: Mikey Lewis
- Jerusalem: Camilla Kerslake
- Referee: Liam Moore
- Attendance: 68,853

Broadcast partners
- Broadcasters: (United Kingdom) Sky Sports (live) (United Kingdom) BBC Two (highlights) (United Kingdom) BBC Radio 5 Live (live radio) (Australia) Fox League SuperLeague+

The 2025 Super League Grand Final, named the 2025 Betfred Super League Grand Final for sponsorship reasons, was the 28th official Super League Grand Final and the championship-deciding rugby league game of the 2025 Super League season. The match was contested between Hull Kingston Rovers and Wigan Warriors at Old Trafford in Manchester, England, a repeat of the 2024 Grand Final.

Wigan Warriors are the defending champions, having won seven Super League Grand Finals including in 2024, and were looking to win three successive Grand Finals for the first time after also winning the 2023 final. Hull Kingston Rovers, meanwhile, were making their second consecutive appearance at a Grand Final in an attempt to win their first ever treble, having finishing top of the Super League table and lifted the League Leader's Shield and having also won the 2025 Challenge Cup final.

Hull Kingston Rovers defeated Wigan 24–6 to claim their first Super League title, and in doing so, became the fifth winners of a Grand Final and achieved their first ever treble.

== Background ==
Pos	Team	Pld	W	D	L	PF	PA	PD	Points
1	Hull Kingston Rovers	27	22	0	5	786	292	+494	44
2	Wigan Warriors	27	21	0	6	794	333	+461	42

=== Route to the final ===
==== Hull Kingston Rovers ====
Round	Opposition	Score
Semi-final	St Helens (H)	20–12
Key: (H) = Home venue; (A) = Away venue; (N) = Neutral venue.

Hull Kingston Rovers finished the regular season as league leaders, earning the team a bye to the semi-final. They played the lowest ranked winner from the eliminators, which was St Helens.

Final score: Hull Kingston Rovers 20-12 St Helens

==== Wigan Warriors ====
Round	Opposition	Score
Semi-final	Leigh Leopards (H)	18–6
Key: (H) = Home venue; (A) = Away venue; (N) = Neutral venue.

2024 Grand Final winners Wigan finished the regular season in second place, earning the Warriors a bye to the semi-final. They played the highest ranked winner from the eliminators, which was the Leigh Leopards, a repeat of their 2024 semi-final fixture.

Final score: Wigan Warriors 18–6 Leigh Leopards

== Pre-match ==
=== Broadcasting ===
In the United Kingdom, both regular providers Sky Sports, via their Main Event channel, and the SuperLeague+ streaming platform aired the Grand Final, with highlights of the Grand Final also aired a day later on BBC Two. Live radio coverage of the final was also provided by BBC Radio 5 Live.

Sky Sports' coverage was also shared with Fox League in Australia and Fox Sports in the US, Digicel in the Pacific Region, Premier Sports Asia in South East Asia, Dubai TV, Sportsnet in Canada, SportsMax in the Caribbean and Sportdigital in Austria, Germany and Switzerland. A deal agreed between IMG and Sport Media Group also saw the Grand Final broadcast for the first time on Sport Media's main channel in Estonia, Lithuania, Latvia, Moldova and Ukraine.

Region	Network
United Kingdom	Sky Sports Main Event; BBC Radio 5 Live; BBC Two (nextday highlights)
Australia	Fox League
United States	Fox Sports 1
Canada	Sportsnet
Caribbean	SportsMax
Pacific Islands	Digicel
South East Asia	Premier Sports
United Arab Emirates	Dubai TV
Estonia; Latvia; Lithuania; Moldova; Ukraine	Sport Media Group, Channel 1

=== Entertainment ===
Pre-match and half-time entertainment was provided by The Pigeon Detectives, with the Grand Final anthem 'Jerusalem' sang by Camilla Kerslake.

=== Officiating ===
Liam Moore refereed the match and was aided by touch judges Marcus Griffiths and Richard Thompson. The video referee was Jack Smith, while the reserve referee was Chris Kendall.

=== Team selection ===
Hull KRs' squad remained largely unchanged from their semi-final victory against St Helens, with the exception of Noah Booth replacing Eribe Doro, and the retiring Michael McIlorum's selection initially being in doubt due to recovering from a fractured ankle; McIlorum finished his career by playing in the Grand Final with his ankle still fractured, although he was substituted during the first half. Jared Waerea-Hargreaves, who was to also retire after the Grand Final, initially faced a three match ban due to committing a Grade C head contact offence in the semi-final fixture, however this ban was overturned upon appeal.

The Wigan Warriors squad remained unchanged following their semi-final match against Leigh.

=== Prize money ===
Prize money was £200,000 for the victors and £140,000 for the runners-up.

== Match details ==
Saturday 11 October 2025
18:00 BST (UTC+01)

Hull KR	24–6	Wigan Warriors
Tries: Lewis 20'; Burgess 27', 79'; Litten 62'; Goals: Mourgue 21'; Martin pen 53', 60', 80' (3/4)	report	Tries: Smith 49'; Goals: Keighran pen 39' (1/2)

Old Trafford, Manchester
Attendance: 68,853
Referee: Liam Moore
Touch judges: Marcus Griffiths and Richard Thompson
Video referee: Jack Smith
Rob Burrow Award: Mikey Lewis (Hull KR)

=== Details ===
Hull KR		Position	Wigan Warriors	
35	Arthur Mourgue	Fullback	1	Jai Field
2	Tom Davies	Wing	2	Abbas Miski
3	Peta Hiku	Centre	3	Adam Keighran
4	Oliver Gildart	Centre	4	Jake Wardle
5	Joe Burgess	Wing	5	Liam Marshall
6	Mikey Lewis	Stand-off	6	Bevan French
7	Tyrone May	Scrum-half	7	Harry Smith
8	Sauaso Sue (substituted off) 22'	Prop	16	Liam Byrne (substituted off) 22' (substituted on) 30'
14	Michael McIlorum (substituted off) 17'	Hooker	9	Brad O'Neill (yellow card) 18' to 28' (substituted off) 58'
10	Jared Waerea-Hargreaves (substituted off) 29' (substituted on) 51' (substituted off) 70'	Prop	10	Luke Thompson (substituted off) 30'
11	Dean Hadley	Second-row	21	Sam Walters (substituted off) 58'
12	James Batchelor	Second-row	12	Liam Farrell
13	Elliot Minchella (substituted off) 58' (substituted on) 71'	Loose forward	13	Kaide Ellis (substituted off) 47' (substituted on) 65'
9	Jez Litten (substituted on) 17'	Interchange	8	Ethan Havard (substituted on) 30'
15	Sam Luckley (substituted on) 58'	Interchange	11	Junior Nsemba (substituted on) 30'
16	Jai Whitbread (substituted on) 29' (substituted off) 71'	Interchange	15	Patrick Mago (substituted on) 47'
17	Rhyse Martin (substituted on) 22'	Interchange	17	Kruise Leeming (substituted on) 22' (substituted off) 58'
18	Jack Broadbent	Concussion substitute	20	Harvie Hill
	(Australia) Willie Peters	Head coach		(England) Matt Peet

== Post-match ==
By winning the Grand Final, Hull Kingston Rovers claimed their first Super League title, becoming the first new winners of a Grand Final since the Leeds Rhinos in 2004 and also becoming rugby league champions for the first time since 1984-85. Following victories in the Challenge Cup Final and winning the League Leader's Shield, Hull Kingston Rovers also achieved their first ever treble, becoming only the seventh club to do so. By comparison, Wigan's loss in the Grand Final represented their first season of rugby league since the appointment of coach Matt Peet in 2022 where they did not win a single trophy.

A day after the final, Hull Kingston Rovers held a victory parade from their home stadium at Craven Park to Hull City Hall. As winners of the Grand Final, Hull Kingston Rovers are expected to play the 2026 World Club Challenge against 2025 NRL Grand Final winners Brisbane Broncos in February 2026.

Television viewing figures for the Sky Sports broadcast averaged at 455,000 during the match, marking a rise in viewership by 22% when compared to the 2024 final, which itself saw a 40% rise.
