= Rusling =

Rusling is a surname. Notable people with the surname include:

- Adam Rusling (born 2003), English rugby league footballer
- Barbara Rusling (born 1945), American politician
- Fay Rusling, British comedy writer and performer
- Sean Rusling (born 1986), Australian rules footballer
- Terry Rusling (1931–1974), Canadian electronic music composer
