= 2023 Challenge Cup final =

Rugby league match in the United Kingdom

2023 Challenge Cup Final
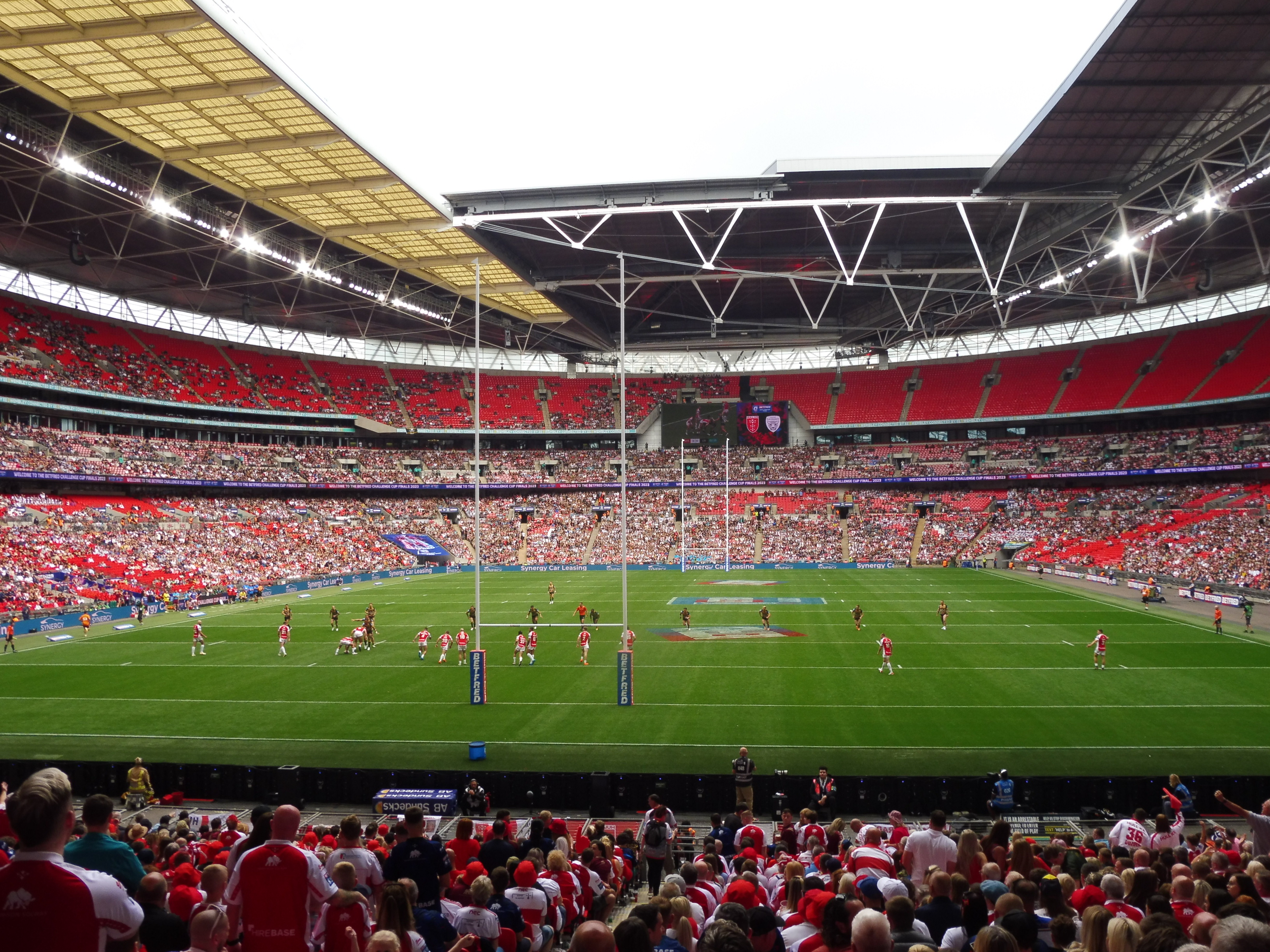
Hull KR	Leigh Leopards
16	17
	1	2	GP1	Total
HKR	8	8	0	16
LEI	10	6	1	17
- Date: 12 August 2023, 15:00
- Stadium: Wembley Stadium
- Location: London, United Kingdom
- Lance Todd Trophy: Lachlan Lam
- God Save The King and Abide with Me: Lizzie Jones
- Referee: Chris Kendall
- Attendance: 58,213

Broadcast partners
- Broadcasters: BBC One
- Commentators: Dave Woods; John Kear; Jonathan Davies

The 2023 Challenge Cup Final was the 122nd final of the Rugby Football League's Challenge Cup knock-out competition. The 2023 final marked its return to Wembley Stadium after its one year hiatus at the Tottenham Hotspur Stadium in 2022. The final was contested by the Leigh Leopards and Hull KR.

Leigh won the cup, their first title since 1971, by 17 points to 16, after the game went to golden point extra time, as Matt Parcell scored a last minute try for Hull KR, (after a lengthy review from the video referee), to level the scores at 16-all after 80 minutes.

Just over one minute into extra time, Leigh were penalised for a ball steal, and Hull KR were awarded a penalty. Brad Schneider kicked to touch, but the ball did not go out of play, and Leigh got the ball back. Gareth O'Brien then tried his luck with a drop goal, but his effort was wide. The next attempt came to Schneider, but he also missed with his effort. Then, on 83 minutes, Lachlan Lam kicked the winning drop goal, to win the match 17-16.

For the first time since 1986, the final did not feature Leeds, St Helens, Wigan or Warrington. It was also the first time the men's and women's final took place at Wembley on the same day – 12 August 2023.

== Background ==
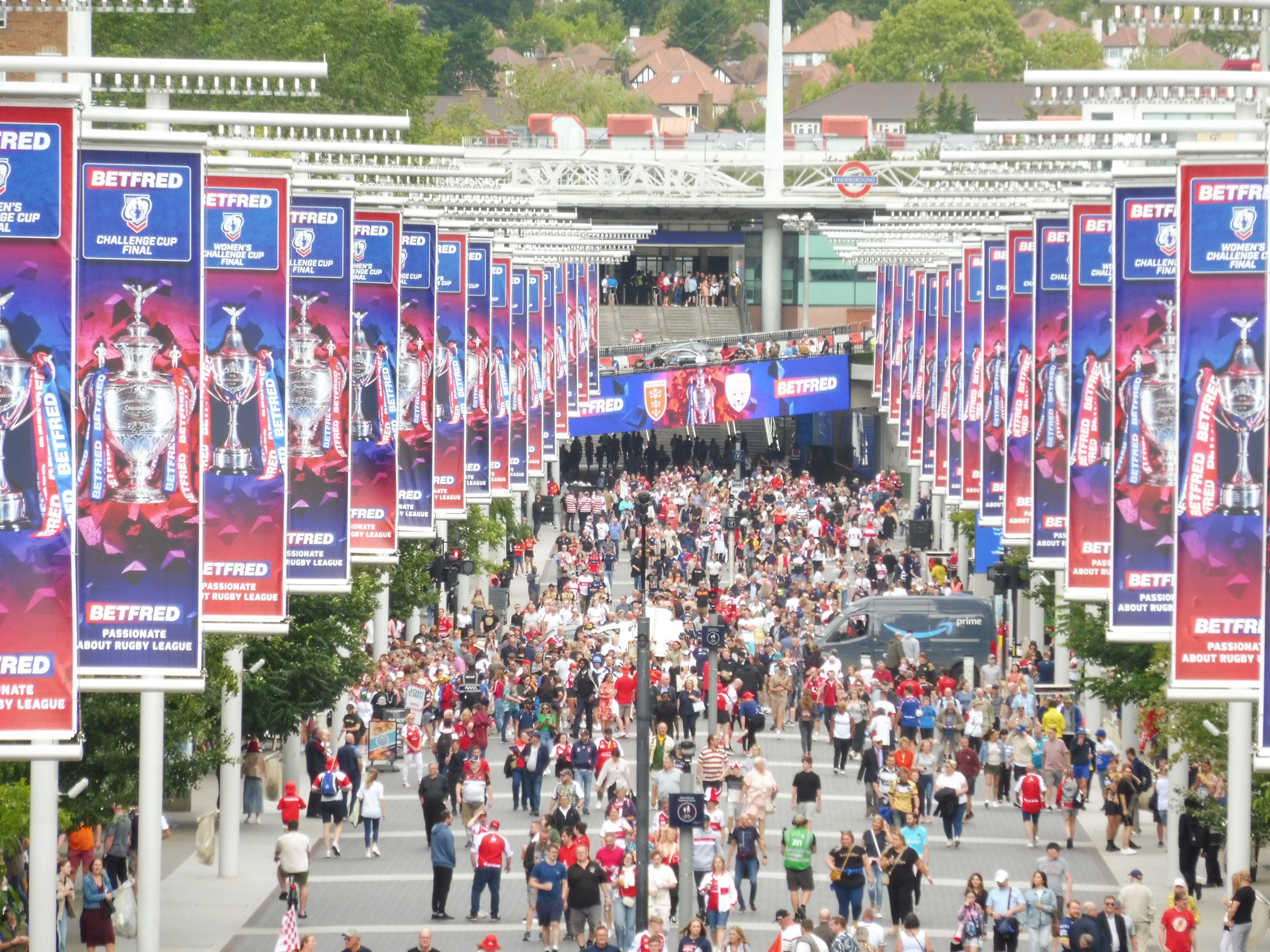
Olympic Way prior to kickoff

The 2023 Challenge Cup final was Leigh Leopards' third final and first in 52 years after winning the 1970–71 Challenge Cup final. Their only other final was in 1920–21 which also resulted in a Leigh win. Leigh were a newly promoted side in 2023 and second in Super League upon reaching the final.

Hull KR by contrast were playing in their eighth Challenge Cup final, with their most recent being their 2015 defeat to Leeds Rhinos treble-winning side. Their only win of their previous seven however was a derby day victory in 1979–80. Hull KR qualified for the cup final placed sixth in the Super League table.

== Route to the final ==
=== Leigh Leopards ===
Round	Opposition	Venue	Score
Sixth round	Wakefield Trinity	Belle Vue	40–12
Quarter-final	York Knights	York Community Stadium	34–14
Semi-final	St Helens	Halliwell Jones Stadium	12–10

=== Hull KR ===
Round	Opposition	Venue	Score
Sixth round	Batley Bulldogs	Craven Park	50–0
Quarter-final	Salford Red Devils	Craven Park	28–10
Semi-final	Wigan Warriors	Headingley	11–10 (golden point)

== Pre-match ==
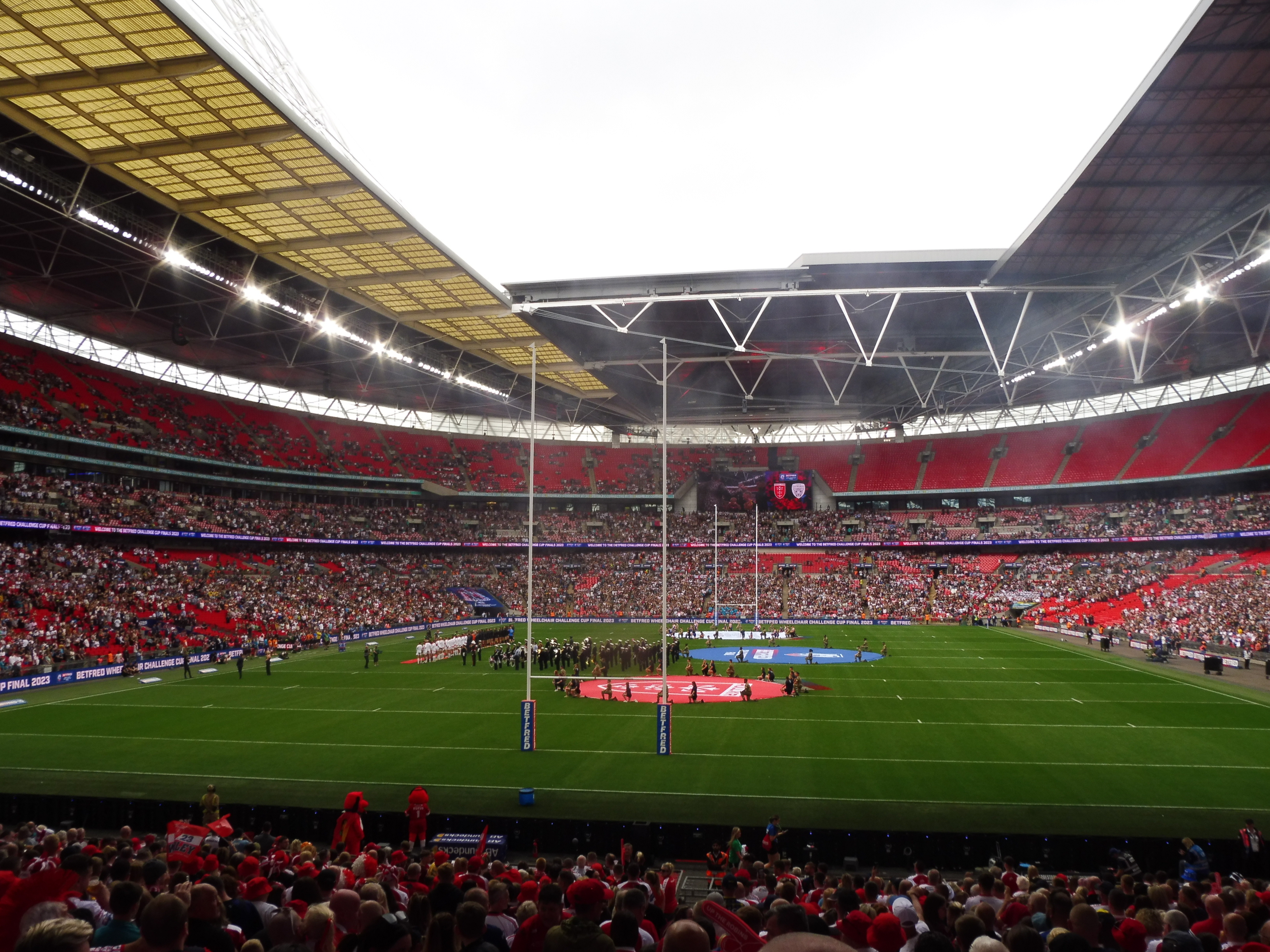
Pre match at Wembley

Before the final, Wembley hosted the Year 7 Champion Schools Finals, known as the Steven Mullaney Memorial Game, with Kingston upon Hull's Archbishop Sentamu Academy rugby league team beating Leigh's Bedford High School team 18–6.

St Helens and Leeds Rhinos competed in the preceding 2023 Women's Challenge Cup final. The match was won by St Helens 22–8, seeing Saints win the competition for the third time in a row and sixth in total.

Traffic on the M1 prevented an estimated 20,000 ticketholders from being present at kickoff.

== Match details ==
Saturday, 12 August
15:00 (BST)

Hull KR	16–17 (g.p.)	Leigh Leopards
Tries: Litten (15'); Parcell (79'); Goals: Schneider (4/4) 16', 40' (penalty), 47' (penalty), 79'	report	Tries: Lam (27'); Briscoe (66'); Goals: Reynolds (4/5) 5' (penalty), 27', 31' (penalty), 67'; Drop goals: Lam (83')

Wembley Stadium, London
Attendance: 58,213
Referee: Chris Kendall

Team details
Hull Kingston Rovers		Position	Leigh Leopards
Name	Number	Position	Number	Name
Mikey Lewis	20	Fullback	17	Gareth O'Brien
Ethan Ryan	2	Wing	5	Josh Charnley
Tom Opacic	3	Centre	3	Ed Chamberlain
Shaun Kenny-Dowall	4	Centre	4	Zak Hardaker
Ryan Hall	5	Wing	2	Tom Briscoe
Rowan Milnes	21	Stand off	15	Ben Reynolds
Brad Schneider	37	Scrum half	7	Lachlan Lam
Rhys Kennedy (substituted off) 28' (substituted in) 60' (substituted off) 70'	15	Prop forward	8	Tom Amone
Jez Litten	14	Hooker	9	Edwin Ipape
George King (substituted off) 28' (substituted in) 54'	10	Prop forward	10	Robbie Mulhern
James Batchelor	16	Second row	24	Kai O'Donnell
Kane Linnett	12	Second row	12	Jack Hughes
Elliott Minchella (yellow card) 31' to 41' (substituted off) 60' (substituted in) 70'	13	Loose forward	13	John Asiata
Matt Parcell	9	Interchange	6	Joe Mellor
Matty Storton	17	Interchange	16	Oliver Holmes
Dean Hadley (substituted in) 28' (substituted off) 75'	22	Interchange	14	Ben Nakubuwai
Sam Luckley (substituted in) 28' (substituted off) 54' (substituted in) 75'	26	Interchange	18	Matty Davis
Jimmy Keinhorst	18	Concussion substitute	11	Joe Wardle
Willie Peters		Coach		Adrian Lam

== Post-match ==
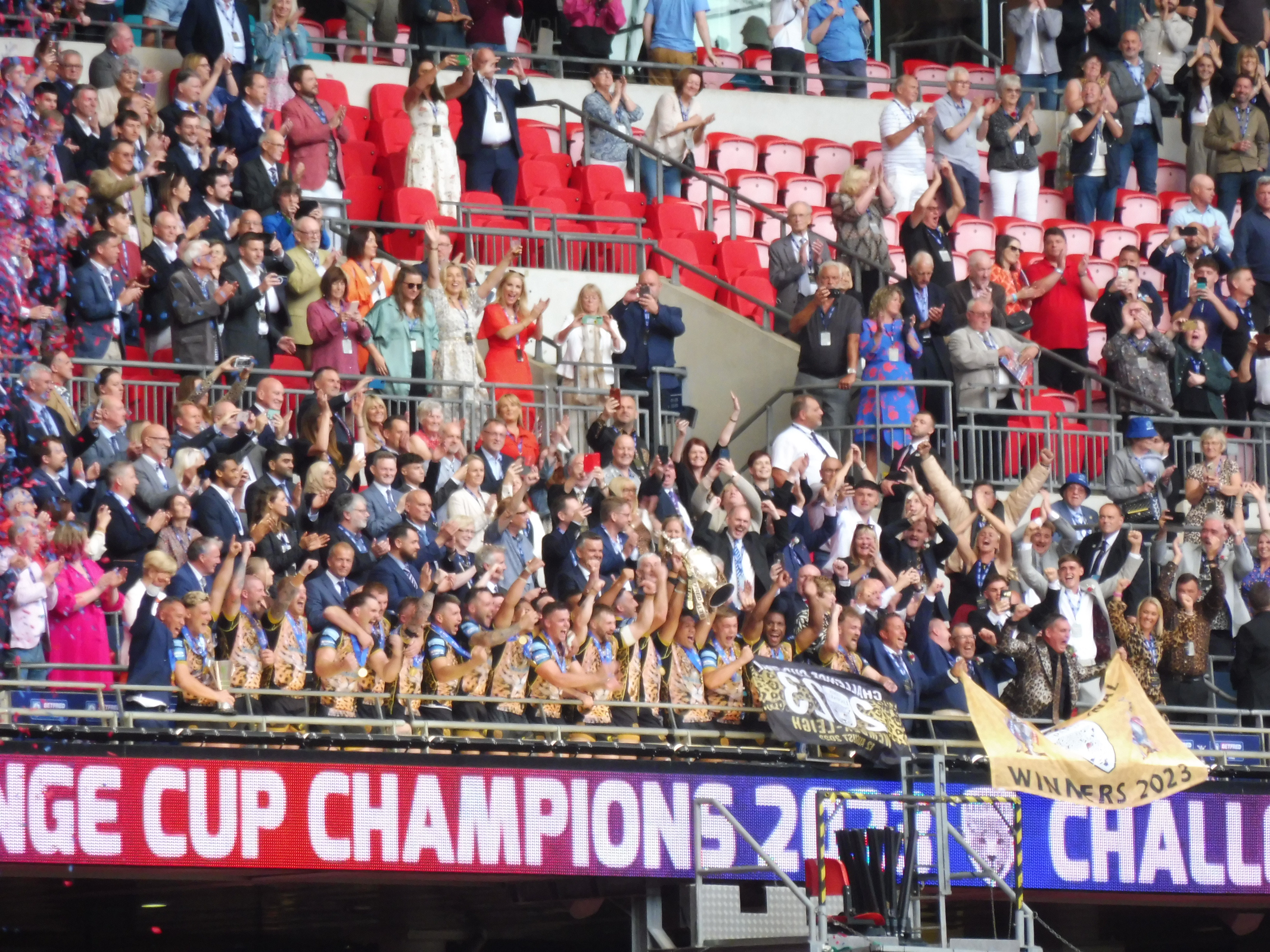
Leigh Leopards lifting the Challenge Cup trophy in the Royal Box Presentation Area

Following the men's and women's Challenge Cup finals, Wembley hosted the final of the 2023 1895 Cup, which saw the Halifax Panthers beat the Batley Bulldogs 12–10.

The following day there was a trophy parade held in Leigh to celebrate the Leopards' victory.
