= Mikey Lewis =

England international rugby league footballer

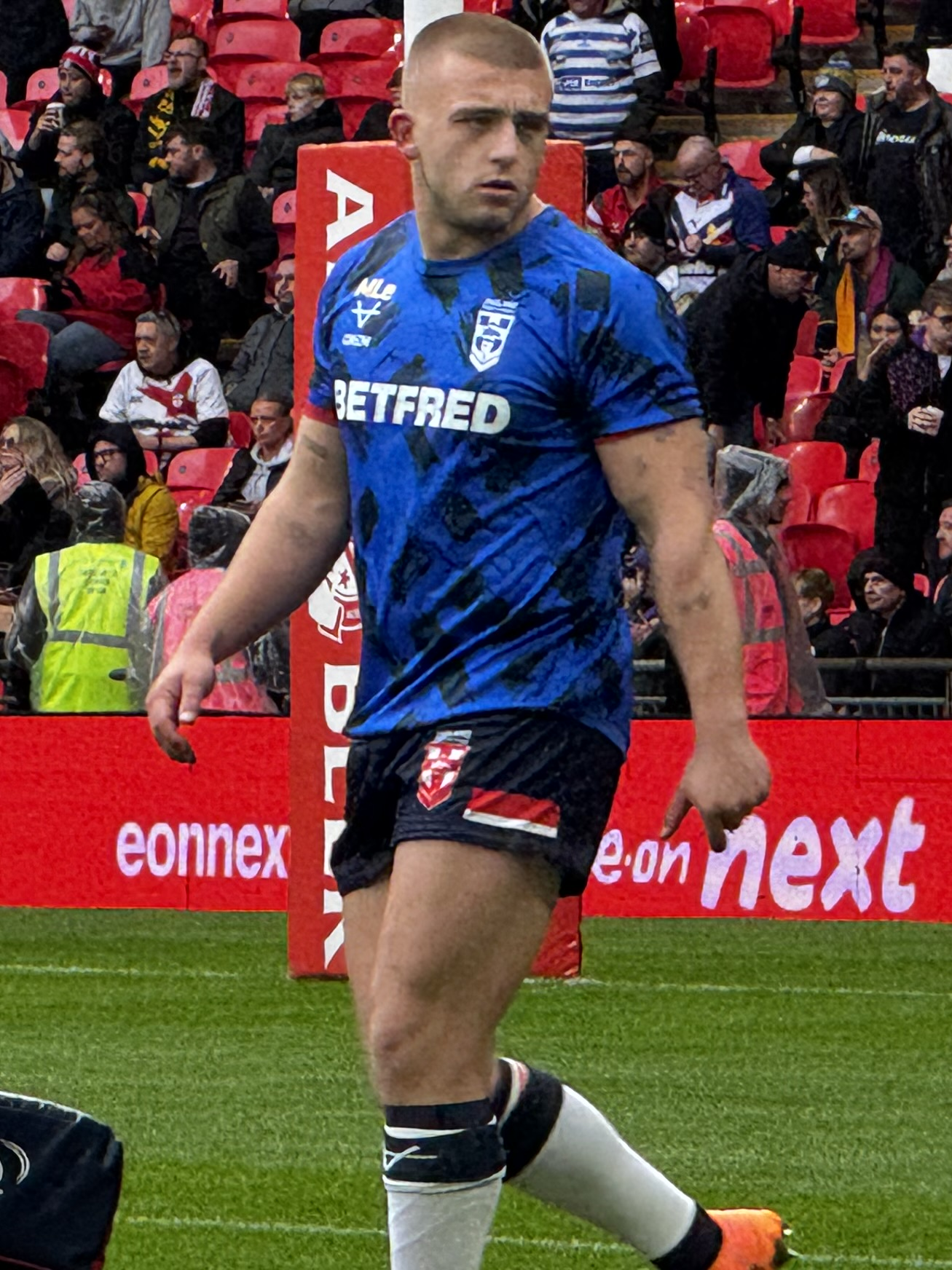
- Lewis in 2025

Personal information
- Born: 4 July 2001 (age 25) Kingston upon Hull, East Riding of Yorkshire, England
- Height: 5 ft 9 in (1.75 m)
- Weight: 14 st 2 lb (90 kg)

Playing information
- Position: Scrum-half, Stand-off, Fullback
Club
Years	Team	Pld	T	G	FG	P
2019–	Hull Kingston Rovers	157	95	136	2	616
2019(loan)	→ Newcastle Thunder	7	7	15	0	58
2021(loan)	→ York City Knights	6	4	1	0	18
	Total	170	106	152	2	692
Representative
Years	Team	Pld	T	G	FG	P
2021–22	England Knights	2	1	0	0	4
2023–	England	10	5	1	0	22
- Source: As of 6 November 2026

Mikey Lewis (born 4 July 2001) is an English professional rugby league footballer who plays as a scrum-half, stand-off or fullback for Hull Kingston Rovers in the Super League and England at international level.

== Club career ==
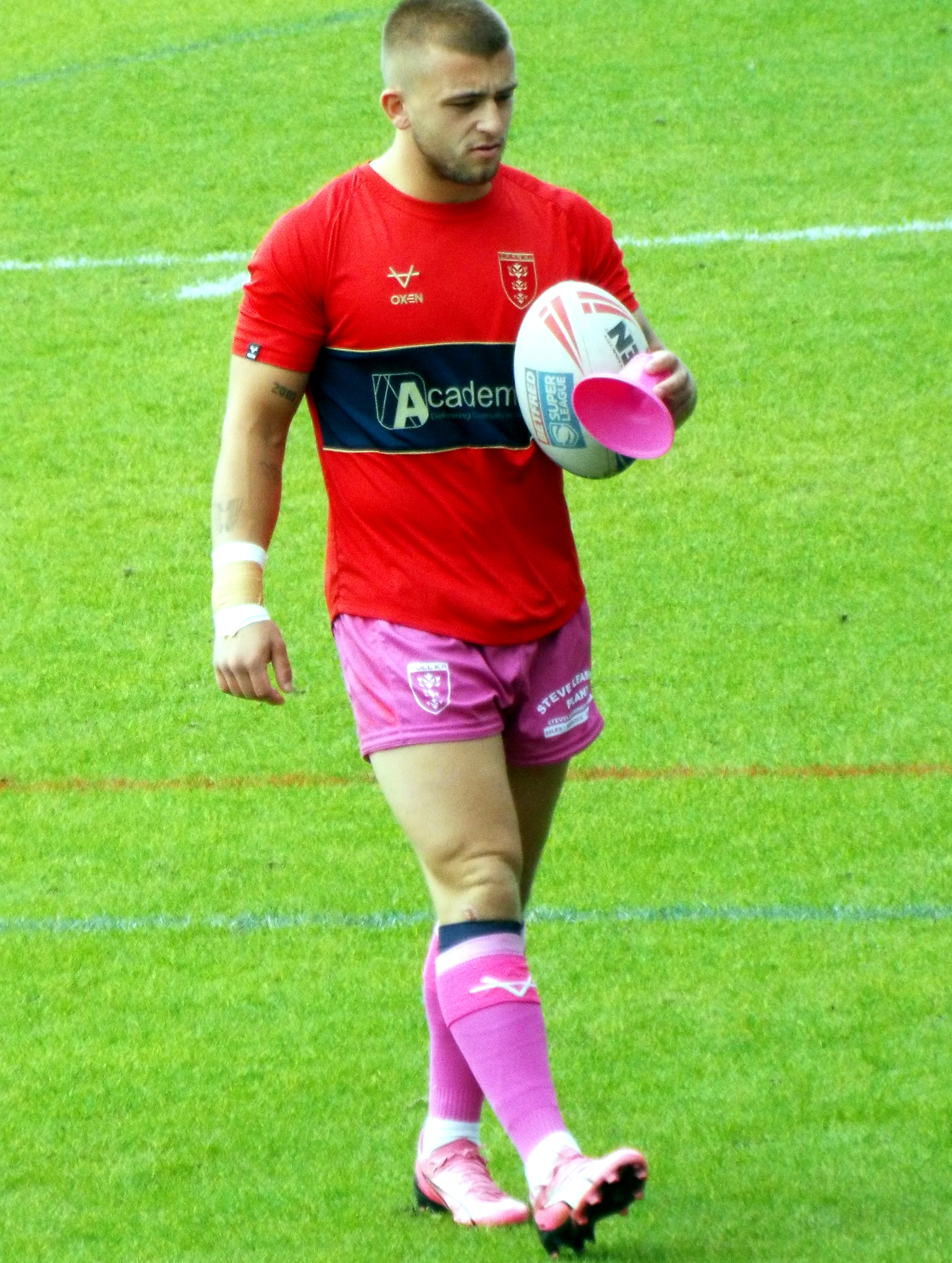
Lewis warming up for Hull KR in 2024

=== 2019 ===
Lewis spent time on loan at Newcastle Thunder in 2019, making seven appearances in total, scoring seven tries and adding 15 goals.

After returning from Newcastle, Lewis made his début for Hull Kingston Rovers in the 2019 season against the Wigan Warriors in a 36-18 round 25 defeat at the DW Stadium on 9 August, replacing Danny McGuire.

=== 2020 ===
In 2020, Lewis made eight appearances in total for Hull KR, scoring two tries and adding five goals.

=== 2021 ===
On 12 May, Lewis signed to play for the York City Knights in the RFL Championship on a one-month loan deal. This was followed by a two-week loan in July during which Lewis played in York's 41-34 defeat by Featherstone Rovers in the 2021 1895 Cup final on 17 July at Wembley Stadium, scoring a single try in the fixture.

Lewis made a total of 12 appearances for Hull KR during the 2021 Super League season, including in the club's 28-10 Super League play-off semi-final loss to the Catalans Dragons. Before the start of the semi-final, Sky Sports pundit Phil Clarke compared Lewis' 2021 season to that of Benji Marshall's 2005 season with the Wests Tigers.

=== 2022 ===
In round 18 of the 2022 Super League season, Lewis scored a hat-trick for Hull KR in their 34-28 defeat by arch-rivals Hull F.C. at the Magic Weekend.

=== 2023 ===
In round 9 of the 2023 Super League season, Lewis scored two tries for Hull KR in a 26-14 victory over St Helens on 14 April 2023, the club's first win over the Saints since 2015.

On 23 July, Lewis played in Hull KR's 11-10 2023 Challenge Cup semi-final victory against Wigan Warriors, won in golden point extra time rules by a 40 m (130 ft) drop-goal from Brad Schneider, at Headingley; Lewis on the receiving end of a shoulder barge from Wigan player Joe Shorrocks within a minute of the second half restart, resulting in Shorrocks' sending-off. On 12 August, Lewis played for Hull KR in their 16-17 golden point extra time loss to the Leigh Leopards in the 2023 Challenge Cup final at Wembley Stadium. Lewis scored two tries for Hull KR in a 52-10 Super League victory over Leigh in a Challenge Cup final rematch two weeks later.

Lewis played in Hull KR's 20-6 Super League play-off eliminator victory against Leigh on 29 September. and on 7 October, played in Hull KR's 42-12 play-off semi-final defeat to Wigan at the DW Stadium.

=== 2024 ===
Lewis was named the Rugby League Writers and Broadcasters' Association player of the year after a 2024 Super League season in which he scored 19 tries as Hull KR finished second in the Super League table. He was also named the 2024 Steve Prescott MBE Man of Steel. On 12 October, Lewis played in Hull KR's 2024 Super League Grand Final 9-2 defeat by Wigan, scoring a penalty kick that would turn out to be Hull KR's only points of the fixture.

=== 2025 ===
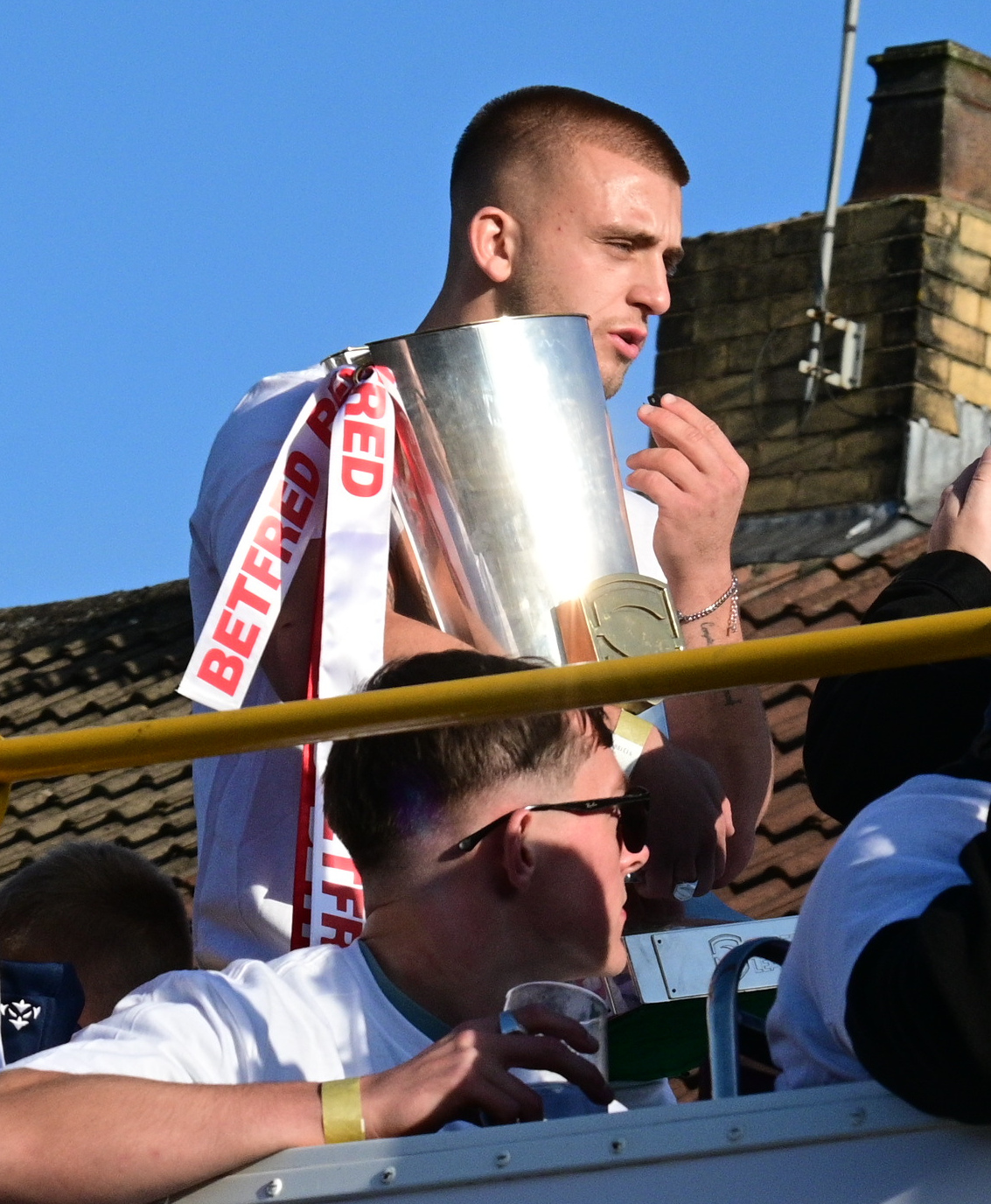
Lewis holding the Super League trophy in 2025

On 13 December 2024, Hull KR announced that, from the 2025 season onwards, Lewis would wear the no. 6 shirt, which had originally been retired in 2016 following the death of Roger Millward. In round 1 of the 2025 Super League season, Lewis kicked the winning drop goal in golden point extra-time as Hull KR defeated the Castleford Tigers 19-18.

Lewis was a central figure in the squad that brought Hull KR its historic first treble during 2025. On 7 June, Lewis played in Hull KR's 8-6 2025 Challenge Cup final victory over Warrington Wolves, taking over goal-kicking duties from cup-tied Arthur Mourgue. Lewis converted a penalty in the first half, and scored the match-winning conversion following a late try by Tom Davies. On 18 September, Lewis played in Hull KR's 28-20 final round victory over Warrington in the fixture that ensured they lifted the League Leaders Shield, and on 9 October, Lewis played in Hull KR's 2025 Super League Grand Final victory over Wigan, scoring the first try of the fixture and winning the Rob Burrow Award after being voted Player of the Match.

=== 2026 ===
In round 1 of the 2026 Super League season, Lewis was given a yellow card for a deliberate trip on an opposition player during Hull Kingston Rovers shock loss to the newly promoted York Knights. Lewis later avoided a ban for the trip, clearing him to play in the 2026 World Club Challenge against Brisbane Broncos on 19 February. Lewis played as fullback in the Hull KR squad that won against Brisbane 30-24 at cross-city rivals Hull F.C.'s MKM Stadium and awarded Hull KR the title of rugby league world champions, admitting in a post-match interview that the trip was "a stupid thing I did" and that he "wanted to earn [the squad's] trust back" over the course of the fixture. In round 9 of the Super League season, Lewis scored four tries for Hull Kingston Rovers as they defeated Bradford 48-12.

== International career ==
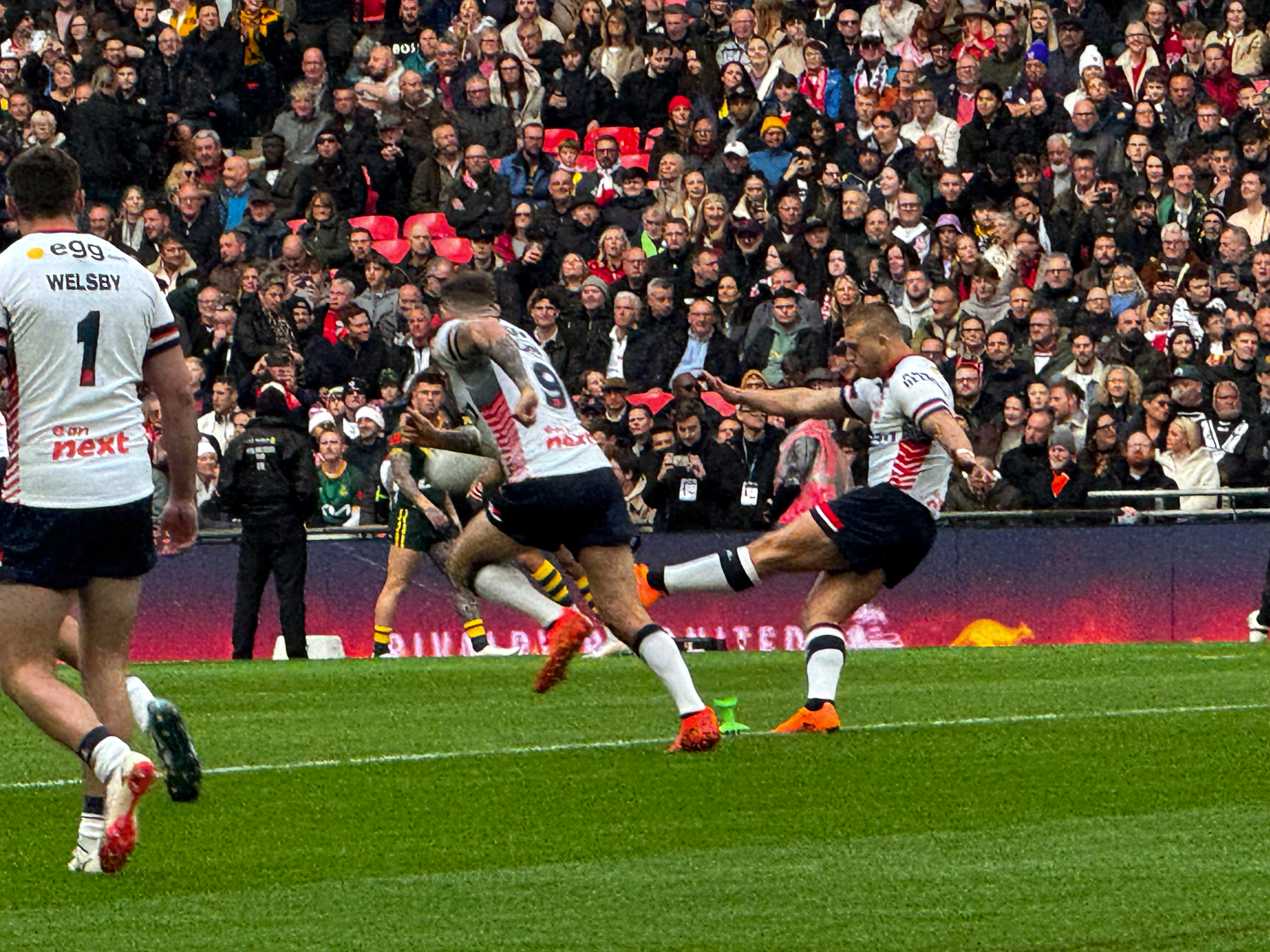
Lewis kicking off for England at Wembley Stadium in the first test of the 2025 Ashes Series

Lewis made his senior England début against Tonga in the first test of the 2023 series on 22 October 2023, scoring a try and winning Player of the Match.

Lewis was called up to England for the 2025 Ashes Series against Australia, playing as a halfback in the first test at Wembley Stadium on 25 October 2025; Lewis scored a conversion kick following England's only try, scored by Daryl Clark, in their 6-26 defeat by Australia. Lewis was a interchange in the second test at the Hill Dickinson Stadium on 2 November, taking on the same position in the third and final test at Headingley on 8 November.

== Honours ==
=== Hull KR ===
- Super League
  - Winners (1): 2025
  - Runner-up (1): 2024
- Challenge Cup
  - Winners (1): 2025
  - Runner-up (1): 2023
- World Club Challenge
  - Winners (1): 2026

==== York Knights (loan) ====
- 1895 Cup
  - Runner-up (1): 2021

=== Individual ===
- Man of Steel:
  - Winners (1): 2024
- RLWBA Player of the Year:
  - Winners (1): 2024
