= Tanguy Zenon =

France international rugby league footballer

Personal information
- Full name: Tanguy Zenon
- Born: 8 May 2002 (age 23) Pyrénées-Orientales, Languedoc-Roussillon, France
- Height: 6 ft 0 in (1.83 m)
- Weight: 13 st 8 lb (86 kg)

Playing information
- Position: Wing, Fullback
Club
Years	Team	Pld	T	G	FG	P
2020–25	Saint-Estève XIII Catalan	36	12	0	0	48
2022–25	Catalans Dragons	5	1	0	0	4
2023(loan)	→ Hull Kingston Rovers	3	1	0	0	4
2026	Halifax Panthers	3	2	1	0	10
2026–	Huddersfield Giants	4	1	5	0	14
	Total	51	17	6	0	80
Representative
Years	Team	Pld	T	G	FG	P
2023–	France	2	1	0	0	4
- Source: As of 29 March 2026

Tanguy Zenon (born 8 May 2002) is a France international rugby league footballer who plays at fullback or wing for the Huddersfield Giants in the Super League.

== Playing career ==
=== 2022 ===
In 2022, he made his début for the Catalans Dragons in the Super League against the Wigan Warriors.

=== 2023 ===
He made his international début for France on 29 April 2023, in a 64-0 defeat to England at the Halliwell Jones Stadium.

On 17 June 2023, Zenon made his début for Hull KR in a Challenge Cup Quarter Final fixture, also going onto score his first try for the Red & Whites in a 28-10 victory over the Salford Red Devils.

=== 2025 ===
On 15 November 2025, it was announced that Zenon had joined the Halifax Panthers on a one year deal.

=== 2026 ===
On 18 February 2026 it was reported that he had signed for Huddersfield Giants in the Super League, after becoming a free-agent as a direct consequence of Halifax Panthers falling into administration
