= Rob Burrow Award =

British rugby league award

- Sport: Rugby league
- Competition: Super League Grand Final
- Country: United Kingdom
- Presented by: Rugby League Writers and Broadcasters' Association

History
- First winner: Bevan French (Wigan Warriors)
- Most recent: Tom Johnstone (Wakefield Trinity)

The Rob Burrow Award is presented annually to the man of the match in the Super League Grand Final. It is named after former Leeds Rhinos player Rob Burrow, the first person to be voted man of the match in two Super League Grand Finals.

The award replaced the Harry Sunderland Trophy in 2024.

== Background ==
Prior to the introduction of the Rob Burrow Award, the man of the match in the Super League Grand Final was awarded the Harry Sunderland Trophy. The trophy was introduced in 1965, over 30 years before the formation of the Super League in 1996. It was awarded to the man of the match in the Championship final between 1965 and 1973, and the Premiership final between 1974 and 1997.

Below is a list of players who have been named man of the match since the inaugural Super League Grand Final in 1998.

| Season | Recipient | Team |
|---|---|---|
| 1998 | Jason Robinson | Wigan Warriors |
| 1999 | Henry Paul† | Bradford Bulls |
| 2000 | Chris Joynt | St Helens |
| 2001 | Michael Withers | Bradford Bulls |
| 2002 | Paul Deacon† | Bradford Bulls |
| 2003 | Stuart Reardon | Bradford Bulls |
| 2004 | Matt Diskin | Leeds Rhinos |
| 2005 | Leon Pryce | Bradford Bulls |
| 2006 | Paul Wellens | St Helens |
| 2007 | Rob Burrow | Leeds Rhinos |
| 2008 | Lee Smith | Leeds Rhinos |
| 2009 | Kevin Sinfield | Leeds Rhinos |
| 2010 | Thomas Leuluai | Wigan Warriors |
| 2011 | Rob Burrow (2) | Leeds Rhinos |
| 2012 | Kevin Sinfield (2) | Leeds Rhinos |
| 2013 | Blake Green | Wigan Warriors |
| 2014 | James Roby | St Helens |
| 2015 | Danny McGuire | Leeds Rhinos |
| 2016 | Liam Farrell | Wigan Warriors |
| 2017 | Danny McGuire (2) | Leeds Rhinos |
| 2018 | Stefan Ratchford† | Warrington Wolves |
| 2019 | Luke Thompson | St Helens |
| 2020 | James Roby (2) | St Helens |
| 2021 | Kevin Naiqama | St Helens |
| 2022 | Jonny Lomax | St Helens |
| 2023 | Jake Wardle | Wigan Warriors |

† = denotes a player who won the trophy but played on the losing team in the final.

== List of winners ==
| Season | Recipient | Team |
|---|---|---|
| 2024 | Bevan French | Wigan Warriors |
| 2025 | Mikey Lewis | Hull Kingston Rovers |
| 2026 | Tom Johnstone | Wakefield Trinity |
