= Brad Schneider (rugby league) =

Australian rugby league footballer

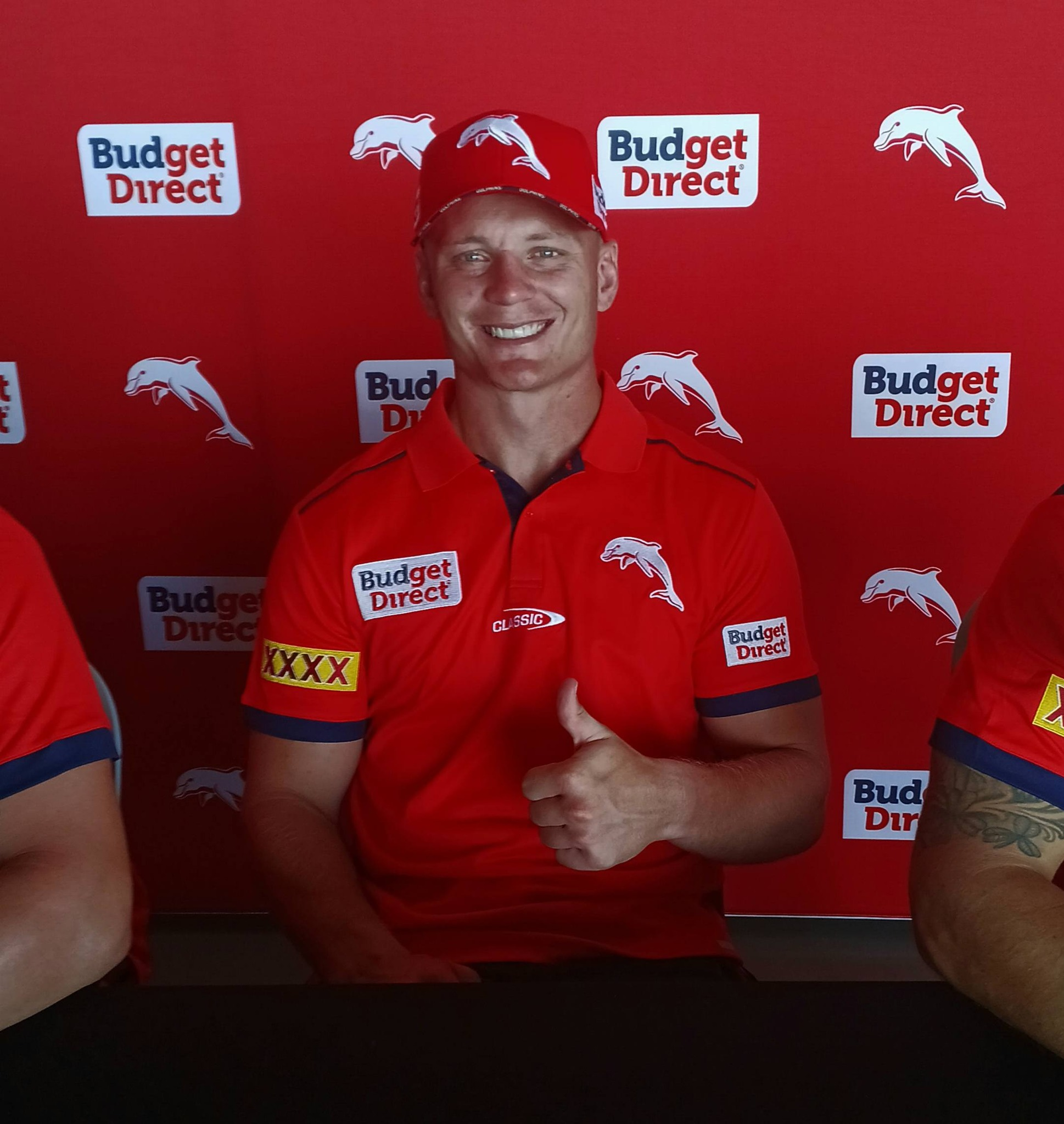

Personal information
- Full name: Bradley Schneider
- Born: 15 February 2001 (age 25) Adelaide, South Australia, Australia
- Height: 184 cm (6 ft 0 in)
- Weight: 88 kg (13 st 12 lb)

Playing information
- Position: Halfback, Five-eighth
Club
Years	Team	Pld	T	G	FG	P
2021–23	Canberra Raiders	12	1	23	0	50
2023	Hull Kingston Rovers	12	3	40	2	94
2024–25	Penrith Panthers	32	6	1	0	26
2026–	Dolphins	13	2	0	0	8
	Total	69	12	64	2	178
- Source: As of 19 July 2026

Brad Schneider (born 15 February 2001) is an Australian professional rugby league footballer who plays as a halfback for the Dolphins in the National Rugby League (NRL). He previously played for the Penrith Panthers (including their successful 2024 NRL Grand Final) and the Canberra Raiders.

== Background ==
Schneider is of German heritage.. He was born in Adelaide, South Australia and was raised in Townsville, Queensland, Australia.

Schneider played junior rugby league for the Western Lions. He attended Kirwan State High School before being signed by the Canberra Raiders.

== Playing career ==
In 2018, Schneider played for the Townsville Blackhawks in the Mal Meninga Cup. In 2019, he captained Kirwan State High School in their NRL Schoolboy Cup final win over Westfields Sports High School.

=== Canberra Raiders (2021-23) ===
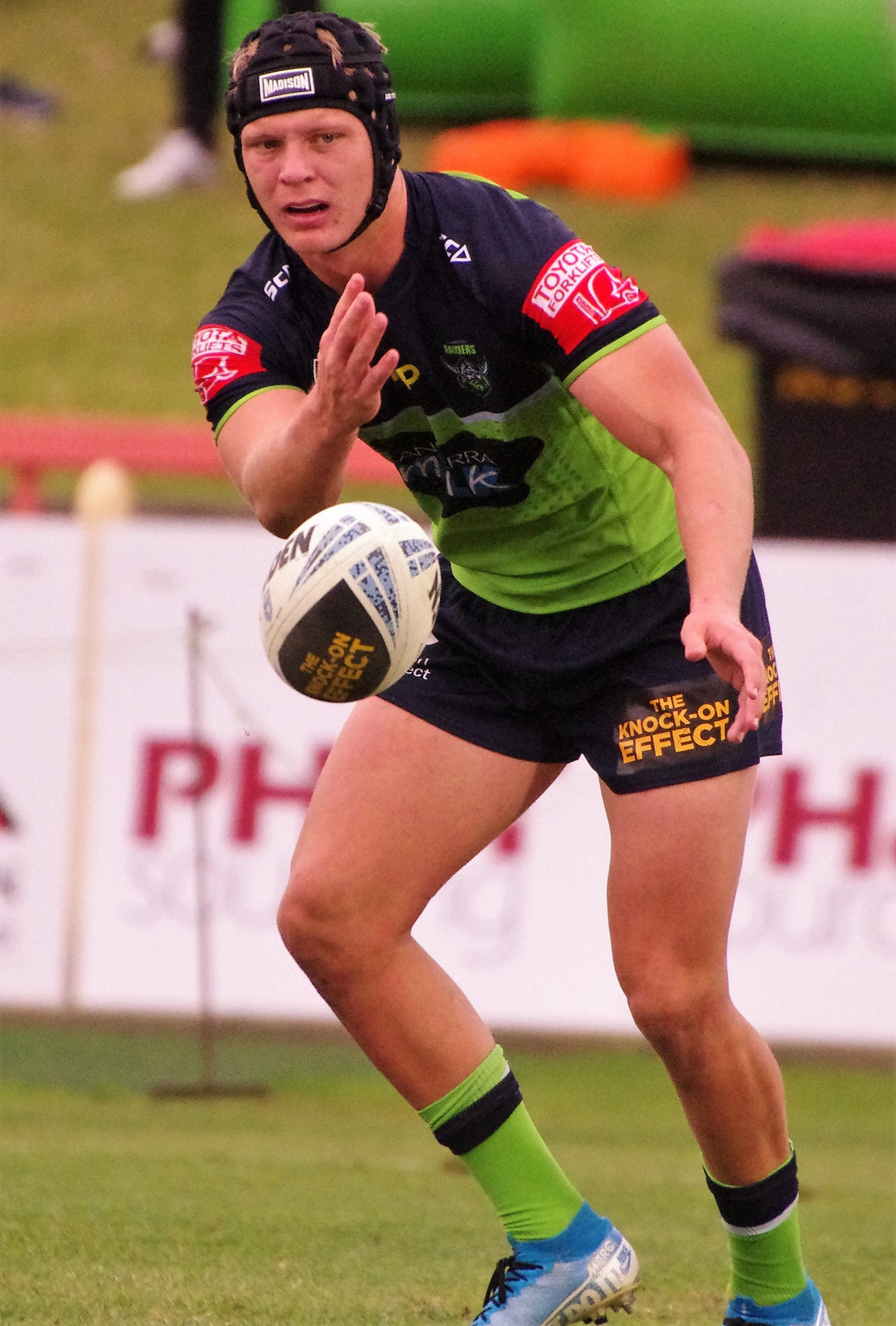
Brad Schneider in 2021

In October 2019, Schneider signed with the Canberra Raiders. In 2020, Schneider was set to play for the Raiders' Jersey Flegg Cup team before the season was cancelled due to the COVID-19 pandemic.

Schneider began the 2021 season playing for Canberra's NSW Cup team. In Round 11 of the 2021 NRL season, Schneider made his first grade début for Canberra against the Melbourne Storm.

Schneider made ten appearances for Canberra in the 2022 season, posting fifty points in total which consisted of scoring one try and twenty-three successful goals. He recorded a 79.31% goal kicking percentage in 2022. Schneider won the Peter Mulholland NRL Rookie of the Year Award in 2022.

=== Hull Kingston Rovers (2023) ===
It was revealed on 6 July, that Schneider had been released by Canberra effective immediately, to be subsequently signed by Hull Kingston Rovers until the end of the 2023 season. A deal in which contained a recall clause, meaning that he could be recalled by Canberra if one of Canberra's halfbacks suffered an injury that would keep them from the field for four weeks or longer. On 14 July, Schneider made his first appearance for Hull KR in a Super League fixture against the Leeds Rhinos at Headingley. Schneider started the game at scrum-half, scored a try on début, made an assist and slotted over a field goal in Golden point extra time to win the game 18-19.

On 23 July, in his next game at the same venue, he repeated the feat against the Wigan Warriors in the semi-final of the Challenge Cup, once again slotting over a match-winning field goal from forty metres in golden point extra time to win the game 11-10. Schneider also kicked his first goal for Rovers in the same game. On 9 August, Schneider was named Glen's Vodka Super League Player of the Month for July. On 12 August, Schneider played for Hull Kingston Rovers in their 16-17 golden point extra time loss to the Leigh Leopards in the 2023 Challenge Cup final at Wembley Stadium. Schneider scored eight of Rovers' sixteen points, by kicking two conversions and two penalty goals.

On 12 September, it was announced that Schneider would return to the National Rugby League for the 2024 season and beyond, to play for Penrith on a two-year contract. On 22 September, in the last game of the regular season, Schneider scored a brace of tries and successfully kicked eight goals in the Robins' 12-56 triumph over Wakefield Trinity. Securing said victory, would mean that Schneider helped Hull KR finish in fourth position overall after twenty-seven rounds. On 29 September, Schneider played in Hull Kingston Rovers' Super League play-off eliminator against the Leigh Leopards, securing a 20-6 success. On 7 October, Schneider played his final game for Hull KR, losing in the Super League play-off semi-final to the Wigan Warriors at the DW Stadium.

=== Penrith Panthers (2024-2025) ===
Schneider played fourteen matches for Penrith in the 2024 NRL season. On 6 October, he won the 2024 NRL Grand Final with them. Schneider played another eleven games with Penrith in 2025.

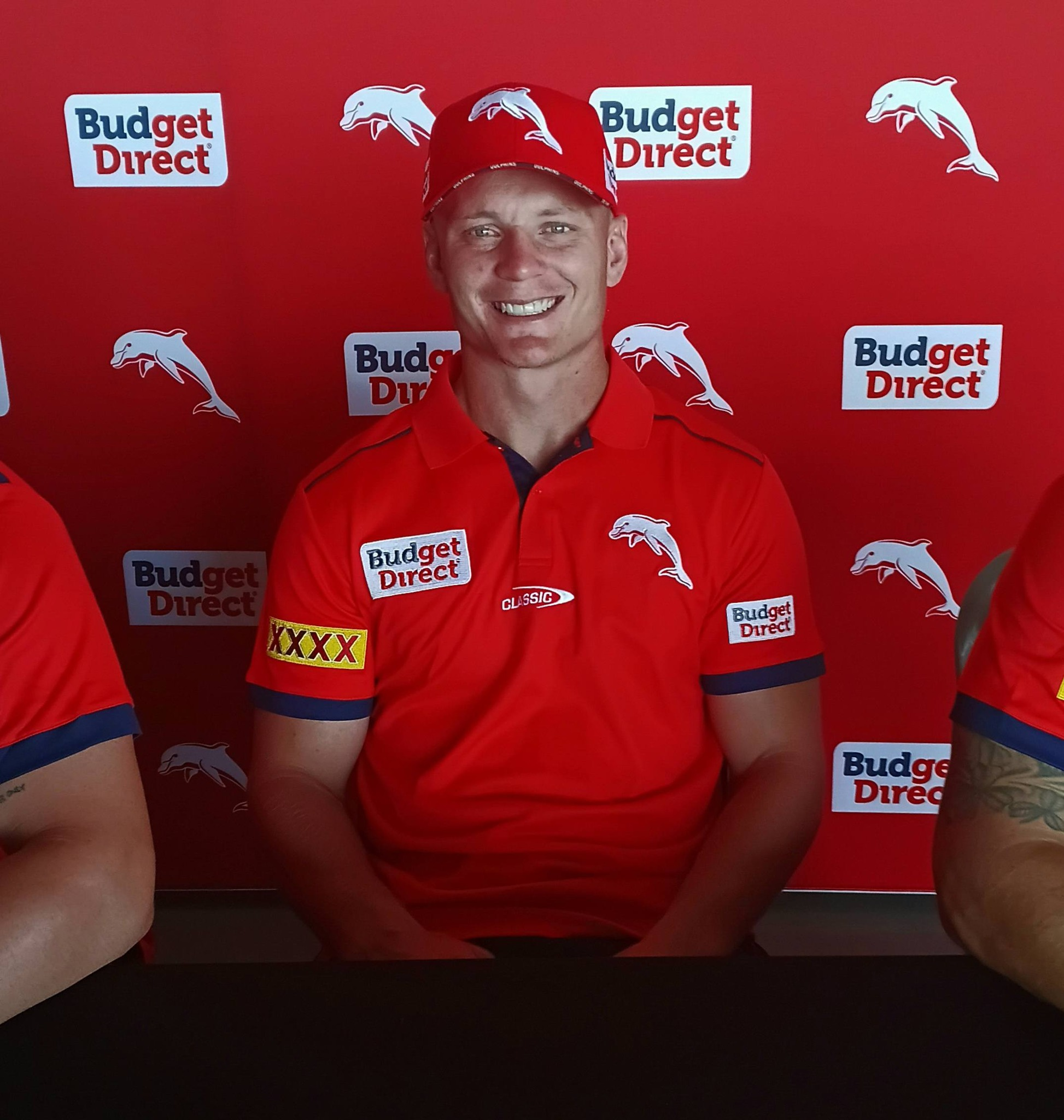
Brad Schneider in 2026

=== Dolphins (2026) ===
On 14 August 2025, the Dolphins announced that they had signed Schneider for the 2026 season. On 16 September 2026, the Dolphins announced that Schneider had re-signed with the club for a further two years. The utility was selected for 13 NRL games in 2026 and won the Queensland Cup and the State Championship final playing for the Redcliffe Dolphins.

== Achievements and accolades ==
=== Individual ===
- 2022 Peter Mulholland NRL Rookie of the Year: Winner
- 2025 Australia Prime Ministers XIII

=== Team ===
2026 Queensland Cup - Winners

2026 NRL State Championship - Winners

Challenge Cup final
Year	Team	Opposition	Venue	Score	Result
2023	Hull KR	Leigh Leopards	Wembley Stadium	16–17	Runners-up

== Statistics ==
Year	Team	Games	Tries	Goals		Pts
2021	Canberra Raiders	1				
2022	Canberra Raiders	10	1	23		50
2023	Canberra Raiders	1				
2023	Hull Kingston Rovers	12	3	40	2	94
2024	Penrith Panthers	14	4	1		18
2025	Penrith Panthers	18	2			8
2026	Dolphins	13	2			8
	Totals	69	12	64	2	178
