= Adam Rusling =

English rugby league footballer

Personal information
- Full name: Adam Rusling
- Born: 25 May 2003 (age 22) Kingston upon Hull, East Riding of Yorkshire, England

Playing information
- Position: Scrum-half
Club
Years	Team	Pld	T	G	FG	P
2021	Castleford Tigers	1	0	0	0	0
2022	Hull Kingston Rovers	0	0	0	0	0
2022(loan)	→ Cornwall	8	4	11	0	38
2023–25	Cornwall	14	4	31	1	79
2026–	Goole Vikings	0	0	0	0	0
	Total	23	8	42	1	117
- Source: As of 17 February 2026

Adam Rusling (born 25 May 2003) is an English professional rugby league footballer who plays as a scrum-half for the Goole Vikings in the RFL Championship.

He has previously played for the Castleford Tigers in the Super League.

== Career ==
=== Castleford Tigers ===
On 11 July 2021, Rusling made his Super League début for the Castleford Tigers against the Salford Red Devils.

=== Hull Kingston Rovers ===
In November 2021, it was announced that he had joined Hull Kingston Rovers, his hometown club, on a reserve contract for 2022.

In August 2022, Hull KR announced the departure of eleven players at the end of the season, including Rusling.

=== Cornwall R.L.F.C. ===
In May 2022, Rusling joined League 1 side Cornwall R.L.F.C. on a short-term loan deal from Hull KR. In June, after impressing in his first games, this loan deal was extended until the end of the season. He made 8 appearances, scoring 4 tries and 11 goals while on loan.

In October 2022, following Rusling's release from Hull KR, Cornwall announced his signing on a permanent deal for the 2023 season.

=== Goole Vikings ===
On 5 December 2025 it was reported that he had signed for Goole Vikings in the RFL Championship
