= 2024 Super League Grand Final =

Rugby league championship match

2024 Betfred Super League Grand Final
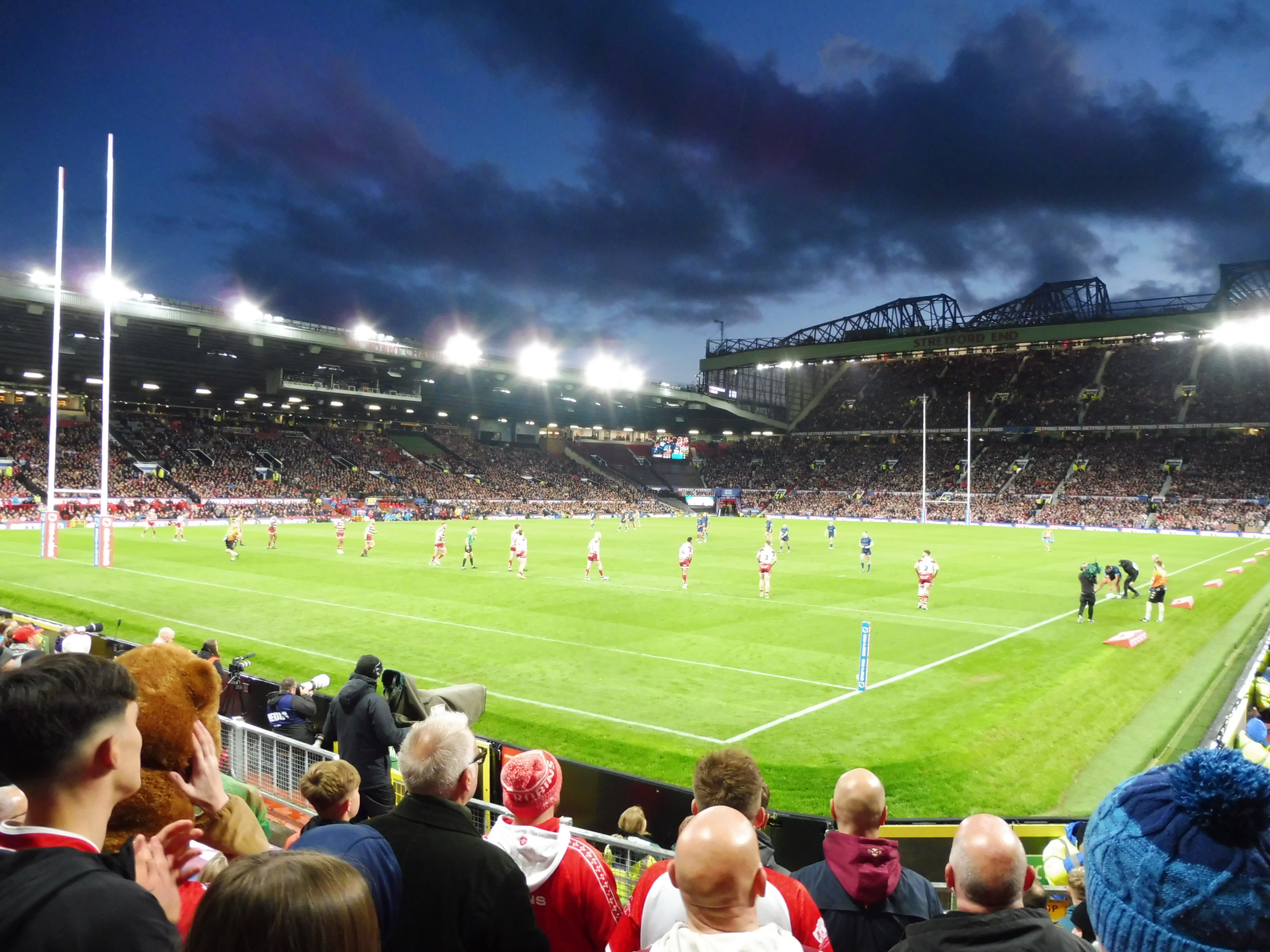
- A view of Old Trafford during the match
Wigan Warriors	Hull KR
9	2
	1	2	Total
WIG	7	2	9
HKR	0	2	2
- Date: 12 October 2024
- Stadium: Old Trafford
- Location: Manchester, England
- Rob Burrow Award: Bevan French
- Jerusalem: Laura Wright
- Referee: Chris Kendall
- Attendance: 68,173

Broadcast partners
- Broadcasters: (United Kingdom) Sky Sports (live) (United Kingdom) BBC Two (highlights) (Australia) Fox League SuperLeague+

The 2024 Super League Grand Final, named the 2024 Betfred Super League Grand Final for sponsorship reasons, was the 27th official Super League Grand Final and the championship-deciding rugby league game of the 2024 Super League season. The match saw Wigan Warriors take on Hull KR at Old Trafford in Manchester, England.

Wigan Warriors were the defending champions, having won six titles including in 2023, while Hull KR were making their first appearance at a Grand Final, having last won a league title in the First Division, the Super League's predecessor, in 1985.

Wigan successfully retained their title with a narrow 9–2 victory to claim their seventh Super League title, and in doing so, become the first team in Super League era to win all 4 major trophies in the same year.

== Background ==
Pos	Team	Pld	W	D	L	PF	PA	PD	Points
1	Wigan Warriors	27	22	0	5	723	338	+385	44
2	Hull Kingston Rovers	27	21	0	6	719	326	+393	42

== Route to the final ==
=== Wigan Warriors ===
Round	Opposition	Score
Semi-final	Leigh Leopards (H)	38–0
Key: (H) = Home venue; (A) = Away venue; (N) = Neutral venue.

2023 Grand Final winners Wigan finished the regular season as league leaders, earning the Warriors a bye to the semi-final. They played the lowest ranked winner from the eliminators, which was the Leigh Leopards.

Final score: Wigan Warriors 38–0 Leigh Leopards

=== Hull Kingston Rovers ===
Round	Opposition	Score
Semi-final	Warrington Wolves (H)	10–8
Key: (H) = Home venue; (A) = Away venue; (N) = Neutral venue.

Hull Kingston Rovers ended the regular season in 2nd place, having lost a highly contested match against Wigan in the 25th round of the season. The position earned them a bye to the semi-finals, where they would play the highest ranked winner of the Eliminators, which was the Warrington Wolves.

Final score: Hull Kingston Rovers 10-8 Warrington Wolves

== Pre-match ==
=== Broadcasting ===
The 2024 Super League season marked the introduction of the SuperLeague+ over-the-top streaming platform, allowing for the Grand Final to be broadcast globally on the platform alongside terrestrial broadcasters.

In the United Kingdom, Sky Sports aired the event, with highlights on terrestrial channel BBC Two.

Sky Sport's coverage was shared globally with Fox League in Australia and the US, Digicel in the Pacific Region, Premier Sports in South East Asia, the Middle East and North Africa, ESPN Africa in Central and Southern Africa, Sportsnet in Canada, SportsMax in the Caribbean and Sportdigital in Austria, Germany and Switzerland.

=== Entertainment ===
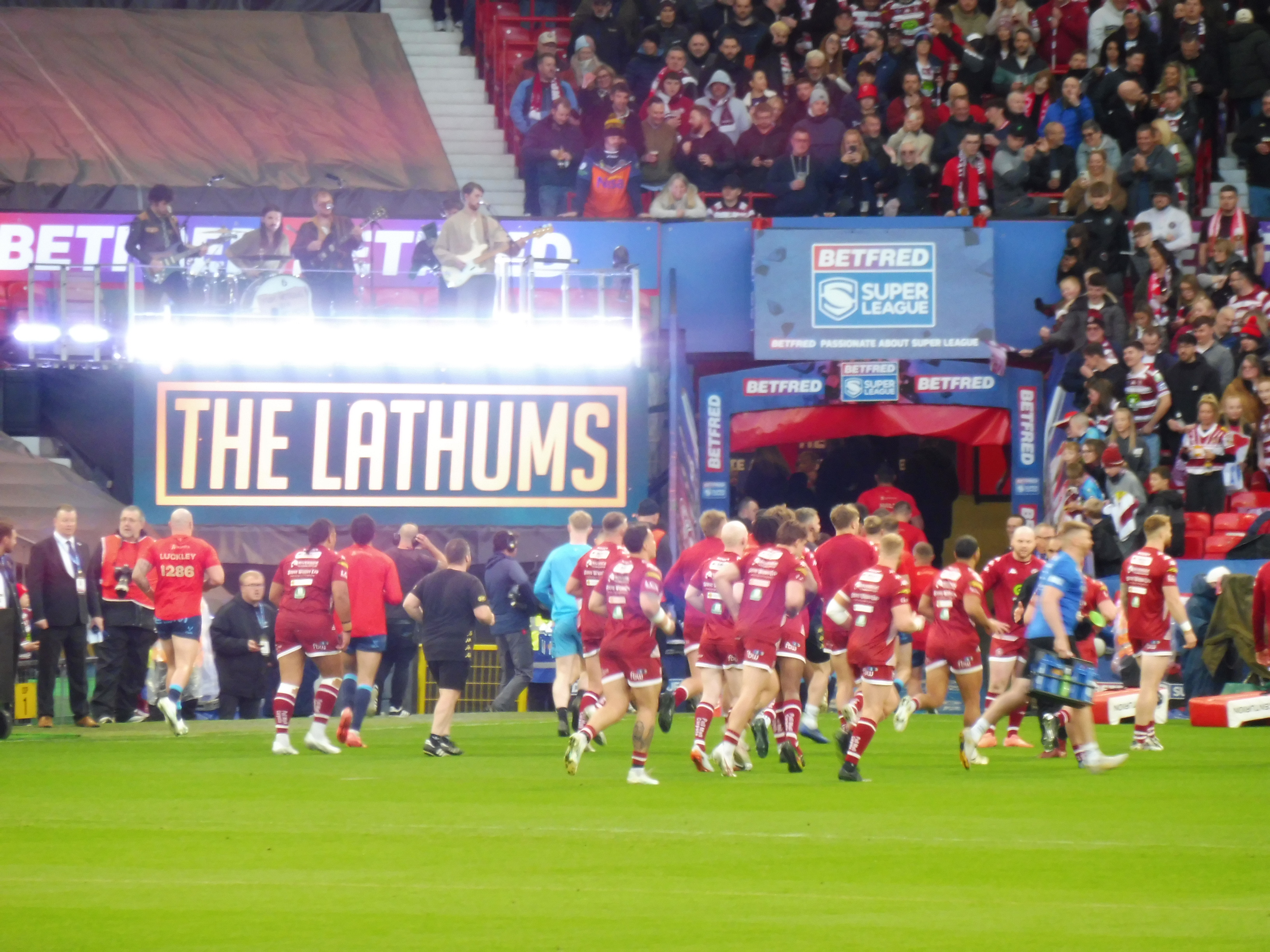
The Lathums performing pre-match

Pre-match and half-time entertainment was provided by The Lathums.

=== Officiating ===
Chris Kendall was the referee for the match, with Richard Thompson and Johnny Roberts as touch judges. Liam Moore was the video referee, while Jack Smith was the reserve referee.

=== Team selection ===
The Wigan Warriors squad remained unchanged following their semi-final match against Leigh.

Hull KR's centre Oliver Gildart was replaced by Jack Broadbent, following his performance in the semi-final against Warrington, while captain and loose forward Elliot Minchella, returned to the squad following a two-match ban, displacing Matty Storton to a substitution. Dean Hadley was assigned as second-row, having covered for Minchella as loose forward during his ban.

== Match details ==
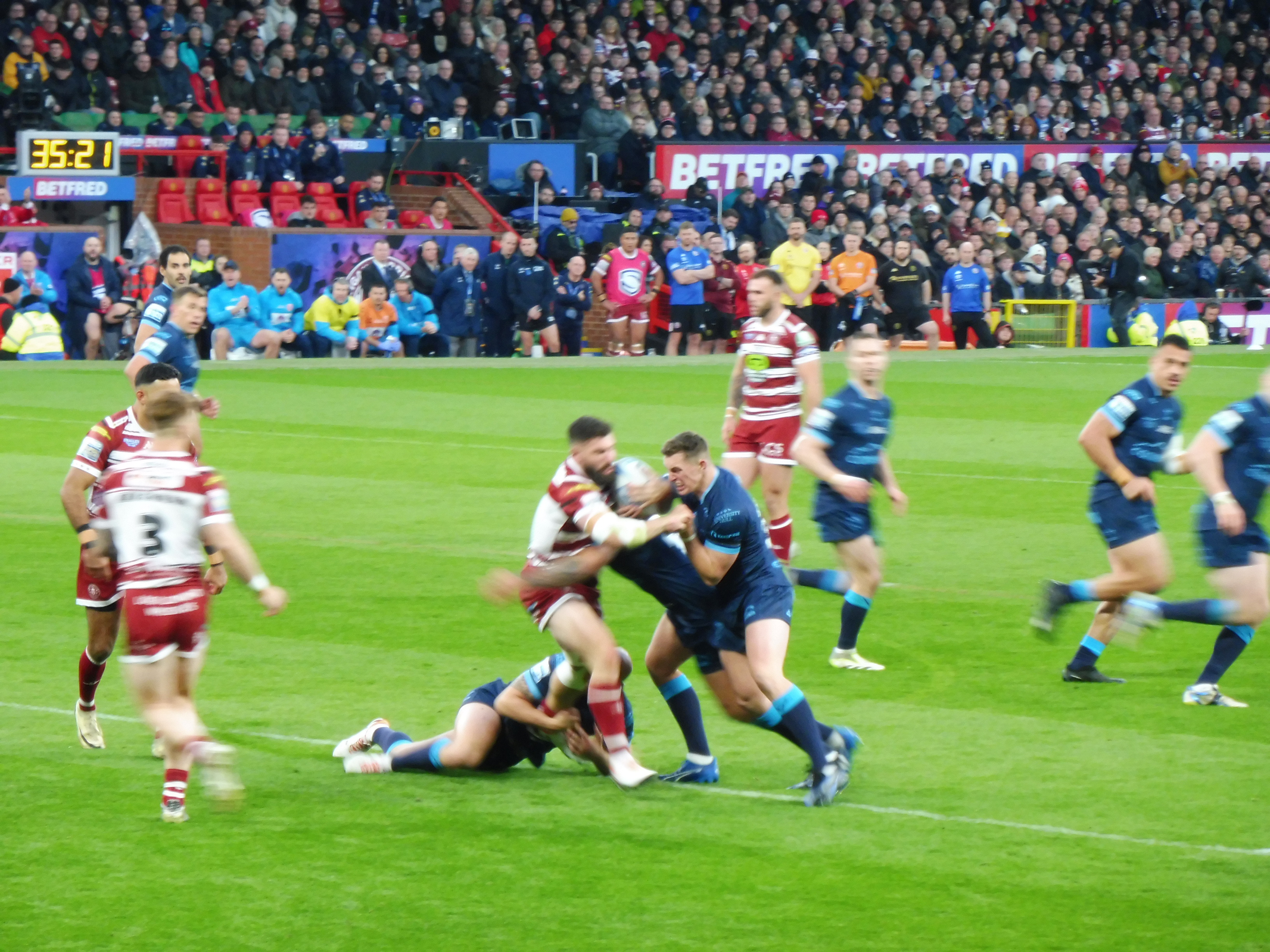
Action during the first half

=== Details ===
12 October 2024
18:00 BST (UTC+01)

Wigan Warriors	9–2	Hull KR
Try: French 23'; Con: Keighran 24'; Pen: Keighran 62'; Drop: Smith 40'	Report	Pen: Lewis 57'

Old Trafford, Manchester
Attendance: 68,173
Referee: Chris Kendall
Touch Judges: Richard Thompson & Johnny Roberts
Video referee: Liam Moore
Rob Burrow Award: Bevan French

Wigan Warriors		Position	Hull KR	
1	Jai Field	Fullback	2	Niall Evalds
2	Abbas Miski	Wing	35	Joe Burgess
3	Adam Keighran 24', 62'	Centre	1	Peta Hiku
4	Jake Wardle	Centre	36	Jack Broadbent
5	Liam Marshall	Wing	5	Ryan Hall
6	Bevan French 23'	Stand-off	27	Tyrone May
7	Harry Smith	Scrum-half	7	Mikey Lewis 57'
8	Ethan Havard (substituted off) 46' (substituted on) 72'	Prop	8	Sauaso Sue (substituted off) 18' (substituted on) 48' (substituted off) 76'
17	Kruise Leeming (substituted off) 48' (substituted on) 78'	Hooker	14	Matt Parcell (substituted off) 64'
16	Luke Thompson (substituted off) 67' (substituted on) 71'	Prop	16	Jai Whitbread (substituted off) 30'
21	Junior Nsemba (substituted off) 13' (substituted on) 27'	Second-row	11	Dean Hadley
12	Liam Farrell	Second-row	12	James Batchelor
13	Kaide Ellis	Loose forward	13	Elliott Minchella
10	Liam Byrne (substituted on) 13' (substituted off) 27' (substituted on) 55' (substituted off) 71'	Interchange	9	Jez Litten (substituted on) 64'
15	Patrick Mago (substituted on) 48' (substituted off) 55'	Interchange	15	Sam Luckley (substituted on) 30' (substituted off) 48'
19	Tyler Dupree (substituted on) 67' (substituted off) 72'	Interchange	17	Matty Storton (substituted on) 76'
27	Tom Forber (substituted on) 47' (substituted off) 78'	Interchange	20	Kelepi Tanginoa (substituted on) 18' (substituted off) 76'
	(England) Matt Peet	Head coach		(Australia) Willie Peters

== Post-match ==
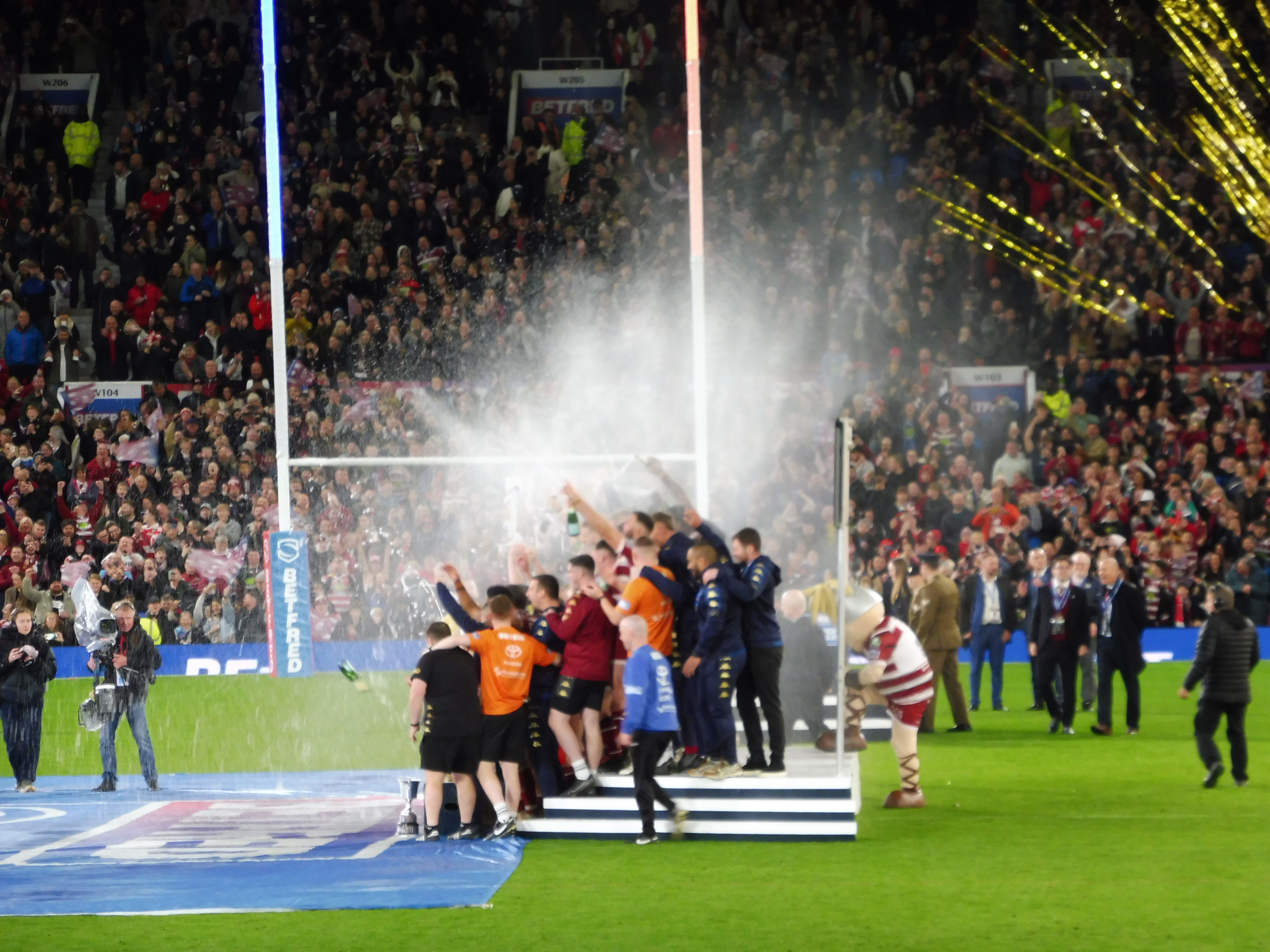
Wigan Warriors lifting the Super League Trophy

By winning the Grand Final, Wigan Warriors won their second 'quadruple' since the 1993-94 season, having also won of the World Club Challenge, the Challenge Cup and the League Leaders' Shield. The quadruple has only been achieved elsewhere by Bradford Bulls in 2003 and St Helens in 2006.

As winners of the Grand Final, Wigan are expected to play the 2025 World Club Challenge against 2024 NRL Grand Final winners Penrith Panthers in February 2025. However, Penrith have announced they were not willing to play the match due to logistical and player welfare concerns relating to the 2025 Rugby League Las Vegas event held the following March.

Television viewing figures for the Sky Sports broadcast averaged at 374,000 during the match, marking a rise in viewership by 40% when compared to the 2023 final.
