= Sam Luckley =

Scotland international rugby league footballer

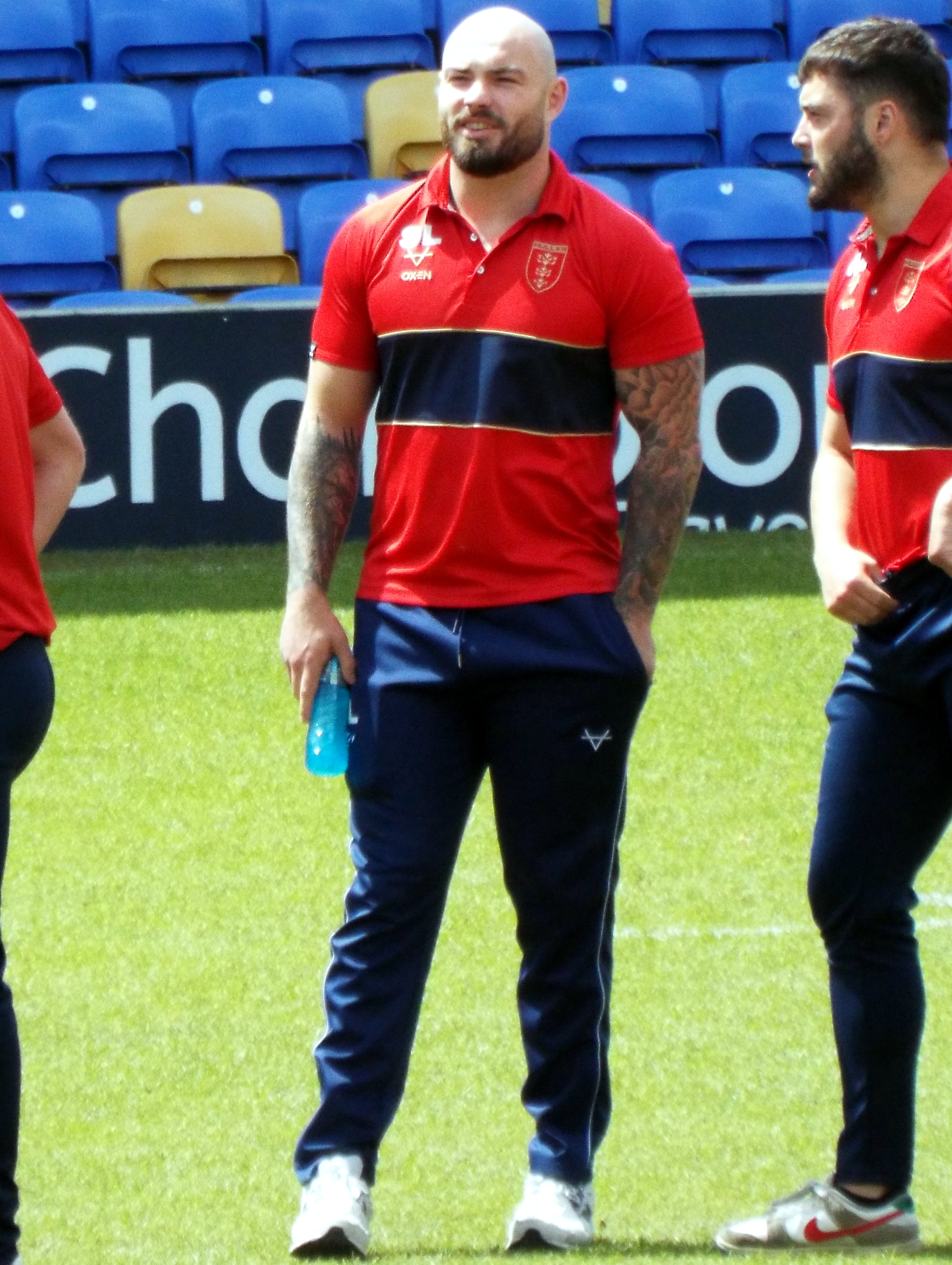

Personal information
- Full name: Sam Luckley
- Born: 29 November 1995 (age 30) Kirkcaldy, Scotland
- Height: 6 ft 1 in (1.85 m)
- Weight: 17 st 0 lb (108 kg)

Playing information
- Position: Prop, Loose forward, Second-row
Club
Years	Team	Pld	T	G	FG	P
2016–20	Newcastle Thunder	82	6	0	0	24
2021–22	Salford Red Devils	27	1	0	0	0
2021(loan)	→ Swinton Lions	4	0	0	0	0
2023–	Hull Kingston Rovers	117	8	0	0	20
	Total	230	15	0	0	44
Representative
Years	Team	Pld	T	G	FG	P
2018–	Scotland	7	0	0	0	0
- Source: As of 19 September 2026

Sam Luckley (born 29 November 1995) is a Scottish rugby league footballer who plays as a prop, second-row or loose forward for Hull Kingston Rovers in the Super League. He notably played for Scotland at the 2022 World Cup.

== Early life ==
Luckley was born in Kirkcaldy, Scotland and grew up in North Shields, England. He is a lifelong supporter of Newcastle United.

== Playing career ==
Luckley previously played for Salford Red Devils in the super league and in the past has represented Newcastle Thunder in League 1. He has also spent time on loan from Salford at the Swinton Lions in the Championship.

In 2021 he made his Salford début in the Super League against the Warrington Wolves.

On 12 August 2023, Luckley featured for Hull KR during the Challenge Cup Final, to which they lost 17-16 in extra time to Leigh.

Luckley played a total of 27 games for Hull Kingston Rovers in the 2023 Super League season as the club finished fourth on the table and qualified for the playoffs. He played in the clubs semi-final loss against Wigan. On 12 October 2024, Luckley played in Hull Kingston Rovers 2024 Super League Grand Final loss against Wigan. On 7 June 2025, he played in the 2025 Challenge Cup final as Hull KR beat Warrington 8-6 to win their first major trophy in 40 years. On 18 September 2025, Luckley played in Hull Kingston Rovers 2025 Victory over Warrington in the last game of the regular season which saw the club lift the League Leaders Shield On 9 October 2025, Luckley played in Hull Kingston Rovers 2025 Super League Grand Final victory over Wigan. On 19 February 2026, Luckley played in Hull Kingston Rovers World Club Challenge victory against Brisbane.
