= Jez Litten =

England international rugby league footballer (born 1998)

Personal information
- Full name: Jez Litten
- Born: 10 March 1998 (age 28) Hull, East Riding of Yorkshire, England
- Height: 5 ft 9 in (1.76 m)
- Weight: 13 st 3 lb (84 kg)

Playing information
- Position: Hooker
Club
Years	Team	Pld	T	G	FG	P
2017–19	Hull FC	18	1	0	0	4
2017(loan)	→ Doncaster	1	0	0	0	0
2018(loan)	→ Doncaster	14	5	0	0	20
2019(loan)	→ Doncaster	4	2	0	0	8
2019–	Hull Kingston Rovers	185	32	26	1	177
	Total	222	40	26	1	209
Representative
Years	Team	Pld	T	G	FG	P
2022–	England Knights	1	0	0	0	0
2023–	England	7	1	0	0	4
- Source: As of 30 October 2026
- Relatives: Davy Litten (cousin)

Jez Litten (born 10 March 1998) is an English professional rugby league footballer who plays as a hooker for Hull Kingston Rovers in the Super League and England at international level.

He has played for Hull F.C., and spent time on loan from Hull at Doncaster in League 1, and at Hull KR starting from the 2019 Super League season. He played as a stand-off and scrum-half earlier in his career.

== Background ==
Litten was born in Kingston upon Hull, East Riding of Yorkshire, England. At junior level, he played rugby league for City of Hull Academy and West Hull.

== Career ==
=== Hull FC ===
In 2017 he made his Super League début for Hull FC against the Warrington Wolves.

In October 2017 Litten agreed to join Doncaster on loan for the 2018 season.

On 22 April, Litten scored his first Super League try in his sides 62–16 loss against St Helens.

=== Hull Kingston Rovers ===
On 29 July 2019, Litten joined rivals Hull Kingston Rovers from Hull F.C., along with teammate Dean Hadley, initially on a loan deal which became a three-year contract at the end of the season.

Litten made a total of 20 appearances for Hull KR in the 2021 Super League season including the club's 28-10 semi-final loss against the Catalans Dragons which saw Hull KR fall one game short of the grand final.

The following season, Litten played 26 games as Hull Kingston Rovers finished 8th on the table.

On 12 August 2023, Litten played for Hull Kingston Rovers in their 17-16 golden point extra-time loss to Leigh in the Challenge Cup final. Litten played a total of 27 games for Hull Kingston Rovers in the 2023 Super League season as the club finished fourth on the table and qualified for the playoffs. He played in the clubs semi-final loss against Wigan.

On 12 October 2024, Litten played in Hull Kingston Rovers 2024 Super League Grand Final loss against Wigan.

On 7 June, Litten played in Hull Kingston Rovers 8-6 Challenge Cup final victory over Warrington. It was the clubs first major trophy in 40 years. On 18 September, Litten played in Hull Kingston Rovers last game of the regular season which saw the club lift the League Leaders Shield in victory over Warrington On 9 October 2025, Litten played in Hull Kingston Rovers 2025 Super League Grand Final victory over Wigan. On 19 February 2026, Litten played in Hull Kingston Rovers World Club Challenge victory against Brisbane.

== International career ==
Litten made his full England début on 29 April 2023 in the 64-0 victory over France at the Halliwell Jones Stadium. He also played in all three matches of the 2025 Rugby League Ashes series.
