= Golden point =

Method of resolving draws in sport

The golden point, a sudden death overtime system, is used to resolve drawn matches in a number of sports. The term is borrowed from soccer's now-defunct golden goal.

== Rugby league ==
=== Australia ===
Introduced ahead of the 2003 NRL season, the golden point is used to determine a winner (where applicable, see below) when scores are level at the end of regular time. Before its introduction in Australia's National Rugby League (NRL) competition, normal season games were left as draws; in finals matches, 20 minutes extra time ensued (10 minutes each way), with a replay in the event of a draw.

If the scores are level at the end of 80 minutes, 5 minutes are played, the teams swap ends with no break, and a further 5 minutes are played. Any score (try, penalty goal, or field goal) in this 10 minute period secures a win for the scoring team, and the game ends at that point. If the scoring event is a try, no conversion is attempted. If no scoring occurs in the 10-minute period, the game is drawn, and each team receives one competition point.

After the 2015 grand final was decided in golden point via a field goal by North Queensland Cowboys halfback Johnathan Thurston, a change was made for finals matches only. Golden point in finals fixtures would now only be applied if scores are level after 10 minutes of extra time (five minutes each way).

It was announced at the beginning of the 1996 Australian Rugby League finals that the system, then termed a "shootout", would be employed for finals series matches. It was further experimented with in the 1997 split season's Super League Tri-series. The golden point rule has been used by the NRL since the 2003 NRL season, and also by the ARL for State of Origin series games, as 1-all draws in the 1999 and 2002 had left the series undecided. The first golden point in State of Origin was scored in the 2004 series, when Shaun Timmins kicked a field goal for NSW to win the opening match of that series 9-8. In the opening match of the 2005 State of Origin series, a Brett Kimmorley (NSW) pass was intercepted by Matthew Bowen (QLD) in the 83rd minute to win Queensland the game.

In 2012, the golden point's merits were again being debated when Australian rugby league broadcaster, the Nine Network's director of sport said "there is a definite spike in the viewing audience when there is golden point. I can't give the figures, but they're significant."

=== Great Britain ===
The Challenge Cup, Great Britain's most prestigious knock-out tournament, operates under the golden point rule and also follows the NRL Finals system. One extra half of five minutes is played, and should neither team have scored any more points in that time, a second period commences until one of the teams scores again, thus winning the game. This does not happen in the final. If the final is drawn then the teams have a replay at a neutral ground. This was first applied in 2009, when the Castleford Tigers defeated Halifax in extra time during the fifth round of the competition. Brent Sherwin kicked a drop goal in the 82nd minute to advance Castleford to the quarterfinals. The second being Warringtons stand off Lee Briers kicking a drop goal to see them through to the Semi Finals against Hull KR. The rule was used for a third time in the 2014 competition when Rangi Chase scored a drop goal in the 83rd minute to send Salford City Reds through 37–36 at Hull F.C. in the third round.

The Million Pound Game between Salford City Reds and Hull Kingston Rovers on 1 October 2016 was decided by a golden point for Salford after the 80 minutes ended 18–18. The result saw Salford maintain Super League status, whilst Hull KR dropped into the National League. A golden point decided a Super League playoff game for the first time on 28 September 2017 for Castleford after a 22–22 draw after 80 minutes. The result saw Castleford defeat St Helens to reach the Super League Grand Final.

On 19 November 2018, it was confirmed that Super League would be adopting golden point during regular season for the first time as of the start of the 2019 season, bringing it in line with the NRL. Super League's first ever regular season golden point game saw Hull FC defeat Wigan Warriors 23–22 on 24 February 2019 after a Marc Sneyd drop goal. On 13 February 2025, the match between Wigan Warriors and Leigh Leopards became the first in Super League history to be scoreless after 80 minutes; Leigh won 1–0 after a golden point drop goal by Gareth O'Brien.

Friendlies may apply the golden point rule, depending on the format of the tie.

Golden point was introduced in the Championship and League 1 competitions commencing with the 2020 season. However unlike Super League where the winners of a golden point take both competition points, in the lower leagues each team will earn one competition point in a drawn game at the end of normal time with a third point going to the team that scores the golden point.

=== Internationals ===
Golden point is also applied to the Tri-Nations final. The format follows that of the NRL finals series: a five-minute period of play followed by a brief pause and then if no points have been scored a second period that continues until points are scored.

In the 2006 series, Australia and New Zealand were locked 12-12 at full-time. Darren Lockyer scored a try in the 87th minute to win the title for Australia.

The 2023 World Club Challenge was the first World Club Challenge match to be decided in golden point extra time, with Lewis Dodd kicking the match-winning field goal to give St Helens R.F.C. a 13–12 victory over the Penrith Panthers, and their first World Club Challenge title since 2007.

== Australian rules football ==
From 2016 to 2019, the Australian Football League grand final had a golden point should the scores be tied at full time, and after two 5 minute overtime periods, after the system was adopted for other finals in 1991. However the tie-breaker was never used.

== Gridiron ==
Golden point (known in North America as "sudden death") was the method of breaking ties in the National Football League regular season from 1974 to 2011, and in the NFL playoffs from 1946 to 2010.

The only other football organization to use golden point was to be the Alliance of American Football, which planned to use sudden death for its playoffs; the AAF ceased play before the playoffs were held. The AAF regular season, college football, high school football and Canadian football all use a procedure known as the Kansas Playoff, where teams are each given a possession near the opponent's goal line and alternate until the game is decided; before the Kansas Playoff, games simply ended in ties (draws), since the only situation where ties were impractical (multiple-round knockout playoff tournaments) were not implemented in most high schools until the 1970s, at lower college levels until the 1980s, and the highest level of college football until 2014.

Golden point has long been perceived as a particularly poor fit for gridiron-based football codes, as possession of the ball is far more secure in the game; the first team to secure possession (which is decided by coin toss) would only need to advance to field goal range and kick the winning field goal, with the opponent having no chance to possess the ball or score, thus effectively deciding the game by the random outcome of the coin toss.

== Badminton ==
In badminton, this method is used to decide the set and/or match when it is tied at 29–all. Whoever scores this point wins the set.

== See also ==
- List of National Rugby League golden point games
