= 2026 Hull Kingston Rovers season =

English rugby league team season

Hull Kingston Rovers 2026 season
- 2026 World Club Challenge champions
- 2026 Super League season Rank: 6th
- Play-off result: Eliminators
- Challenge Cup: Runners-up
- World Club Challenge: Champions
- 2026 record: Wins: 21; draws: 0; losses: 13
- Points scored: For: 748; against: 503

Team information
- Chairman: Neil Hudgell
- Head Coach: Willie Peters
- Captain: Elliot Minchella
- Stadium: Sewell Group Craven Park
- Agg. attendance: 11,787
- High attendance: 12,325; Hull F.C., 3 April
- Low attendance: 10,246; Wigan Warriors, 21 May

Top scorers
- Tries: Joe Burgess (19)
- Goals: Rhyse Martin (81)
- Points: Rhyse Martin (184)
Home colours	Away colours	Third colours
← 2025	List of seasons	2027 →

The 2026 season was Hull Kingston Rovers' tenth consecutive season playing in England's top division of rugby league. They competed in the 2026 Super League season, the 2026 Challenge Cup and, as Super League champions, the 2026 World Club Challenge.

== Preseason friendlies ==
Date and time	Versus	H/A	Venue	Result	Score	Tries	Goals	Attendance	Report
25 January; 15:00	Wakefield Trinity	H	Craven Park	L	6–34	Leyland	Charles (1/1)		

== World Club Challenge ==
The 2026 World Club Challenge was confirmed on 6 November 2025, and would be held at the MKM Stadium. The match was the first time since 1986 that Hull Kingston Rovers had played against an Australian team.

Date and time	Versus	H/A	Venue	Result	Score	Tries	Goals	Attendance	TV	Report
19 February, 19:30	Brisbane Broncos	H	MKM Stadium	W	30–24	Amone, Minchella, Burgess, Gildart, Hiku	Mourgue (2/2), Martin (3/3)	24,600	BBC Three; Sky Sports	

== Super League ==
From 2026, the Super League expanded to 14 teams, with Toulouse Olympique and York Knights being promoted from the RFL Championship via the IMG Grading system. At a meeting of all twelve Super League teams at the Headingley Rugby Stadium on 28 July 2025 to vote on the expansion proposal, Hull Kingston Rovers were one of two teams to vote against expanding the league, with the club preferring for expansion to have instead taken place ahead of the 2027 season.

On 14 May 2025, it was announced that Hull Kingston Rovers would be part of the 2026 Rugby League Las Vegas event, playing their Round 3 fixture against the Leeds Rhinos at the Allegiant Stadium in Paradise, Nevada.

=== Fixtures ===
Hull Kingston Rovers' Super League 2026 fixtures were released on 27 November 2025:

Date and time	Round	Versus	H/A	Venue	Result	Score	Tries	Goals	Attendance	TV	Pos.	Report
12 February; 20:00	Round 1	York Knights	A	York Community Stadium	L	18–19	Whitbread (2), Sue	Martin (3/3)	8,500	Sky Sports + Main	8th	
20 February; 20:00	Round 2	Warrington Wolves	H	Craven Park	N/A	P–P (Note: Fixture postponed and rearranged to 18 August due to Hull Kingston Rovers' World Club Challenge commitments.)				N/A	12th (Note: With a game in hand.)	
1 March; 00:00 (GMT)	Round 3 (Rugby League Las Vegas)	Leeds Rhinos	N	Allegiant Stadium	L	6–58	Burgess	Martin (1/1)	45,719	Sky Sports Main Event	14th	
8 March; 15:00	Round 4	Huddersfield Giants	A	Kirklees Stadium	W	32–6	Davies (2), Lewis (2), Gildart, Burgess	Lewis (1/2), Martin (3/4)	4,827	Sky Sports +	12th	
21 March; 17:30 (GMT)	Round 5	Catalans Dragons	A	Stade Gilbert Brutus	L	20–26	May, Burgess, Amone	Lewis (3/3 + 1 pen.)	8,156	Sky Sports +	11th	
27 March; 20:00	Round 6	St Helens	H	Craven Park	W	52–10	Burgess (3), Lewis (3), Litten, Batchelor, Whitbread	Lewis (7/9 + 1 pen.)	12,169	Sky Sports Main Event	9th	
3 April; 12:30 (Good Friday)	Round 7 (Rivals Round)	Hull F.C. (Note: 250th Hull derby fixture)	H	Craven Park	W	24–6	Burgess (2), Broadbent, Gildart, Litten	Lewis (2/5)	12,325	Sky Sports + Main	7th	
17 April; 18:00 (BST)	Round 8	Toulouse Olympique	A	Stade Ernest Wallon	W	46–0	Burgess (2), Minchella, Martin, Hadley, Litten, Hiku, Whitbread	Lewis (1/1), Martin (6/7)	6,135	Sky Sports +	7th	
25 April; 15:00	Round 9	Bradford Bulls	A	Odsal Stadium	W	48–12	Lewis (4), May, Martin, Broadbent, Hiku	Martin (8/8)	7,751	Sky Sports +	5th	
30 April; 20:00	Round 10	Castleford Tigers	H	Craven Park	W	50–6	Davies (3), Lawton (2), Amone, Hadley, Lewis, Burgess	Martin (7/9)	11,807	Sky One; Sky Sports + Main	4th	
16 May; 17:30	Round 11	Leigh Leopards	A	Leigh Sports Village	W	20–16	Hiku, Davies, Mourgue	Martin (3/3 + 1 pen.)	9,028	Sky Sports Action	4th	
21 May; 20:00	Round 12	Wigan Warriors	H	Craven Park	W	62–4	Lewis (3), Davies, Litten, Whitbread, Martin, Hadley, Booth, Broadbent, Luckley	Martin (9/11)	10,246	Sky Sports + Main	4th	
6 June; 16:30 (Note: Fixture moved an hour earlier from 17:30 due to selection for live broadcasting.)	Round 13	Wakefield Trinity	A	Belle Vue	L	24–26	Lewis, Whitbread, Luckley, May	Lewis (2/2), Martin (2/2)	8,608	BBC Two; Sky Sports +	5th	
12 June; 20:00	Round 14	York Knights	H	Craven Park	W	38–6	Davies (2), Lewis, Burgess, Batchelor, Broadbent, Martin	Martin (5/7)	11,408	Sky Sports +	3rd	
19 June; 20:00	Round 15	Leigh Leopards	H	Craven Park	W	22–8	Burgess, Hiku, Whitbread, Leyland	Martin (2/4 + 1 pen.)	11,625	Sky Sports + Main	3rd	
26 June; 20:00	Round 16	Leeds Rhinos	A	Headingley Rugby Stadium	L	8–34	Booth	Martin (1/1 + 1 pen.)	18,456	Sky Sports + Main	6th	
4 July; 15:00	Round 17 (Magic Weekend)	Hull F.C.	N	Hill Dickinson Stadium	W	26–12	Lewis, Martin, Whitbread, May	Martin (3/4 + 2 pen.)	34,539	Sky Sports + Main	5th	
11 July; 17:30	Round 18	Wakefield Trinity	H	Craven Park	L	6–20		Martin (3 pen.)	11,408	Sky Sports Action	5th	
18 July; 15:00	Round 19	Warrington Wolves	A	Halliwell Jones Stadium	L	12–34	Gildart, Batchelor	Martin (2/2)	10,025	Sky Sports + Main	7th	
23 July; 20:00	Round 20 (Rivals Round Reversed)	Hull F.C.	A	MKM Stadium	W	34–20	Amone, Mourgue, Broadbent, Burgess, Dezaria	Mourgue (5/5 + 2 pen.)	18,809	Sky Sports + Main	6th	
31 July; 20:00	Round 21	Bradford Bulls	H	Craven Park	W	40–16	Burgess (2), Broadbent, May, Litten, Davies, Minchella	Hampshire (3/4), Martin (3/3)	12,126	Sky Sports +	5th	
7 August; 20:00	Round 22	Castleford Tigers	A	Wheldon Road	W	44–0	Davies (2), May (2), Litten, Burgess, Hiku, Martin	Hampshire (1/2), Martin (5/5)	9,203	Sky Sports +	5th	
13 August; 20:00 (Note: Fixture moved from 14 August at 20:00 to accommodate rescheduled Warrington Round 2 fixture.)	Round 23	Catalans Dragons	H	Craven Park	W	28–10	Broadbent (2), Litten, Burgess, May	Martin (4/5)	11,294	Sky Sports +	5th	
18 August; 20:00	Round 2	Warrington Wolves	H	Craven Park	L	28–34	Lewis, Lawton, Hadley, Pangai Junior	Martin (1 pen.), Mourgue (4/4 + 1 pen.)	11,785	Sky Sports Main Event	5th	
22 August; 17:30 (Note: Fixture moved from 20 August at 20:00 to accommodate rescheduled Warrington Round 2 fixture.)	Round 24	Toulouse Olympique	H	Craven Park	L	12–32	Minchella, Gorman	Martin (2/2)	11,798	Sky Sports +	6th	
27 August; 20:02 (Note: Kick-off moved to 20:02 in tribute to former Wigan No.2 player Billy Boston.)	Round 25	Wigan Warriors	A	Brick Community Stadium	L	0–46			16,847	Sky Sports + Main	6th	
4 September; 20:00	Round 26	Huddersfield Giants	H	Craven Park	W	36–6	Mourgue (2), Minchella, Broadbent, Litten, Davies	Mourgue (3/3), Martin (2/3 + 1 pen.)	11,541	Sky Sports +	6th	
11 September; 20:00	Round 27	St Helens	A	BrewDog Stadium	L	12–36	Leyland, Holden	Charles (2/2)		Sky Sports +	6th	

=== Table ===
Pos	Team	Pld	W	D	L	PF	PA	PD	Pts	Qualification
1	Wigan Warriors (L)	27	22	0	5	851	439	+412	44	Advance to Semi-finals
2	Leeds Rhinos	27	20	0	7	904	426	+478	40	Advance to Semi-finals
3	Warrington Wolves (A)	27	20	0	7	726	465	+261	40	Advance to Eliminators
4	Wakefield Trinity (A)	27	19	0	8	709	486	+223	38	Advance to Eliminators
5	Leigh Leopards (E)	27	17	0	10	644	497	+147	34	Advance to Eliminators
6	Hull KR (E)	27	16	0	11	748	503	+245	32	Advance to Eliminators
7	St Helens	27	15	0	12	636	614	+22	30	
8	Toulouse Olympique	27	10	0	17	578	704	−126	20	
9	Catalans Dragons	27	10	0	17	537	802	−265	20	
10	York Knights	27	9	0	18	545	791	−246	18	
11	Hull F.C.	27	8	0	19	488	597	−109	16	
12	Huddersfield Giants	27	8	0	19	509	765	−256	16	
13	Castleford Tigers	27	8	0	19	464	866	−402	16	
14	Bradford Bulls	27	7	0	20	468	852	−384	14	

Updated to match(es) played on 12 September 2026. Source:
(A) Advance to a further round; (E) Eliminated; (L) League Leaders' Shield Winners

=== Play-offs ===
Date and time	Round	Versus	H/A	Venue	Result	Score	Tries	Goals	Attendance	TV	Report
19 September; 17:30	Eliminators	Warrington Wolves	A	Halliwell Jones Stadium	L	12–35	Burgess, Hadley	Mourgue (2/2)	11,073	BBC Two; Sky Sports + Main	

== Challenge Cup ==
Hull Kingston Rovers were first drawn on 12 January to play Lock Lane ARLFC in Round 3, following Lock Lane's 42-6 defeat of Brighouse Rangers in their delayed Round 1 fixture on 17 January; as a result of Featherstone Rovers being removed from the competition, Lock Lane gained an automatic bye to enter Round 3. The fixture was originally set to be played away at Lock Lane's Hicksons Arena, with neighbouring Castleford Tigers offering their Wheldon Road stadium as an alternative venue, however both teams later agreed to swap the venue to Craven Park by the request of Lock Lane's players.

Following their victory against Lock Lane, which saw records for Hull Kingston Rovers' highest-scoring victory and most goals scored in a fixture broken, Hull Kingston Rovers beat the Huddersfield Giants away 52-12 in Round 4, entering them into the quarter-finals, then after beating the York Knights 48-10 at home, were drawn to play 2025 finalists Warrington Wolves in the semi-finals.

A 32–12 victory over Catalans qualified Hull Kingston Rovers to play in the 2026 Challenge Cup final at Wembley Stadium, where they played the Wigan Warriors in a 2025 Super League Grand Final rematch. Hull Kingston Rovers ultimately emerged as runners-up in the final against Wigan, who won the match 40-10 with a dominant display over Rovers amid hot conditions at Wembley.

Date and time	Round	Versus	H/A	Venue	Result	Score	Tries	Goals	Attendance	TV	Report
6 February; 20:00	Round 3	Lock Lane ARLFC	H	Craven Park	W	104–0 (Note: This fixture marked Hull Kingston Rovers' highest-scoring fixture of all time, beating a 100–6 record set against Nottingham City RLFC in August 1990.)	Broadbent (3), Horne (3), Davies (2), Charles (2), Sue, Minchella, Booth, Lawton, Gildart, Mourgue, Whitehead, Brown	Martin (16/18) (Note: Martin's goals during this fixture made him Hull Kingston Rovers' highest goal scorer in a single fixture, beating a record of 14 goals jointly held by Colin Armstrong, Alf Carmichael, Damien Couturier and Mike Fletcher.)		Not televised	
14 March; 15:00	Round 4	Huddersfield Giants	A	Kirklees Stadium	W	52–12	Lewis (2), Whitehead, Hiku, May, Leyland, Luckley, Gildart, Broadbent	Martin (8/9)	2,736	The Sportsman	
11 April; 13:30	Quarter-finals	York Knights	H	Craven Park	W	48–10	May (3), Sue, Broadbent, Whitbread, Lewis, Burgess	Martin (3/4 + 1 pen.), Lewis (3/3), Litten (1/1)	8,752	BBC Two	
10 May; 16:00	Semi-finals	Warrington Wolves	N	Eco-Power Stadium	W	32–12	Burgess (2), Batchelor (2), Gildart	Lewis (2/2 + 1 pen.), Martin (2/3 + 1 pen.)	12,054	BBC Two	
30 May; 14:00	Final	Wigan Warriors	N	Wembley Stadium	L	10–40	Hiku (2)	Martin (1/2)	56,383	BBC One	

== Transfers ==
=== Gains ===
Player	Club	Contract	Date
(Australia) Tom Amone	Canterbury Bulldogs (Note: Amone also spent a large portion of the 2025 season on loan to Castleford Tigers.)	3 years	April 2025
(England) Jumah Sambou	Oldham R.L.F.C.	3 years	May 2025
(England) Declan Murphy	Salford Red Devils	3 years	August 2025
(England) Cobie Wainhouse	Hull F.C.	2 years	August 2025
(England) Jack Charles	Hull F.C.	4 years	October 2025
(France) Jordan Dezaria	Catalans Dragons	3 years	October 2025
(England) Tom Whitehead	Warrington Wolves	3 years	November 2025
(Australia) Karl Lawton	North Queensland Cowboys	3 years	December 2025
(England) Ryan Hampshire	Featherstone Rovers	End of season	April 2026
(Tonga) Tevita Pangai Junior	SC Leucate	End of season	May 2026
(England) Ryan Westerman	Hull F.C.	End of season	June 2026
(England) Flynn Holden	Warrington Wolves	2 1/2 years	June 2026

=== Losses ===
Player	Club	Contract	Date
(England) Neil Tchamambe	Wakefield Trinity	2 years	March 2025
(New Zealand) Jared Waerea-Hargreaves	N/A	Retirement	April 2025
(England) Kye Armstrong	Released		September 2025
(England) Michael McIlorum	N/A	Retirement	September 2025
(Jamaica) Ajahni Wallace	Toulouse Olympique	1 year	October 2025
(England) Danny Richardson	York Knights	2 years	October 2025
(Australia) Phoenix Laulu-Togaga'e	Catalans Dragons	1 year	October 2025
(England) Lennie Ellis	Sheffield Eagles	1 year	October 2025
(Nigeria) Eribe Doro	Bradford Bulls	2 years	October 2025
(England) Leo Tennison	York Knights	1 year	November 2025
(Australia) Kelepi Tanginoa	Warrington Wolves	2 years	November 2025
(England) Jack Brown	Castleford Tigers	1 1/2 years	June 2026

==== Loans out ====
Player	Club	Loan period	Date
(England) Leon Ruan	Bradford Bulls	End of season	December 2025
(England) Jumah Sambou	Widnes Vikings	End of season	January 2026
(France) Jordan Dezaria	St Helens	One week	March 2026
(England) Bill Leyland	St Helens	One week	March 2026
(England) Lee Kershaw	Huddersfield Giants	One week	May 2026
(England) Tom Whitehead	Doncaster R.L.F.C.	End of season	June 2026
(England) Zach Fishwick	Batley Bulldogs	Three weeks	July 2026
(England) Harvey Horne	Doncaster R.L.F.C.	End of season	July 2026
(Ireland) Louix Gorman	Salford RLFC	One week	August 2026
(England) Declan Murphy	Salford RLFC	One week	August 2026

== Squad ==
2026 Hull Kingston Rovers squad
First team squad			Coaching staff
1 (France) Arthur Mourgue – FB, SH, SO (gk); 2 (England) Tom Davies – WG; 3 (New Zealand) Peta Hiku – CE, WG, FB; 4 (England) Oliver Gildart – CE; 5 (England) Joe Burgess – WG, CE; 6 (England) Mikey Lewis – SO, SH, FB, HK (gk); 7 (Samoa) Tyrone May – SH, CE, SO; 8 (Samoa) Sauaso Sue – PR, LF, SR; 9 (England) Jez Litten – HK, SH; 10 (Australia) Tom Amone – PR; 11 (England) Dean Hadley – SR, LF, PR; 12 (England) James Batchelor (vc) – SR; 13 (England) Elliot Minchella (c) – LF, SR, HK	14 (England) Jack Broadbent – CE, FB, WG, SO; 15 (Scotland) Sam Luckley – PR, LF, SR; 16 (Australia) Jai Whitbread – PR; 17 (Papua New Guinea) Rhyse Martin – SR, LF, CE (gk); 19 (Australia) Karl Lawton – HK, LF, SR; 20 (France) Jordan Dezaria – PR, SR, LF; 21 (England) Noah Booth – CE, WG, FB; 22 (England) Bill Leyland – HK; 23 (England) Lee Kershaw – WG; 24 (England) Jack Charles – SO, SH; 25 (Ireland) Louix Gorman – WG, FB; 26 (England) Harvey Horne – WG; 27 (England) Leon Ruan – SR	28 (England) Zach Fishwick – PR; 29 (England) Tom Whitehead – SR, LF; 30 (England) Cobie Wainhouse – PR; 31 (England) Declan Murphy – FB; 33 (England) Frankie Dearlove – SR; 34 (England) Ryan Hampshire – SO, SH (gk); 35 (Tonga) Tevita Pangai Junior – PR, SR, LF; 37 (England) Ryan Westerman – CE; 38 (England) Flynn Holden – FB, WG	Head coach: (Australia) Willie Peters; Assistant coaches: (Wales) Ian Watson; (England) Luke Gale; (England) David Hodgson; Legend: (c) Captain(s); (vc) Vice-captain(s); (red card) = suspended; = injured; (gk) = Goal kicker; Updated: 19 September 2026; Source(s): Hull KR confirm 2026 Squad Numbers
