= 2025 Hull Kingston Rovers season =

English rugby league team season

Hull Kingston Rovers 2025 season
- 2025 Super League champions 2025 Challenge Cup champions
- 2025 Super League season Rank: 1st
- Play-off result: Champions
- Challenge Cup: Champions
- 2025 record: Wins: 29; draws: 0; losses: 5
- Points scored: For: 786; against: 292

Team information
- Chairman: Neil Hudgell
- Head Coach: Willie Peters
- Captain: Elliot Minchella
- Stadium: Craven Park
- Agg. attendance: 11,271
- High attendance: 12,338; Hull F.C., 7 September (Note: This match marked Hull Kingston Rovers' highest attended Super League home match of all time and highest home attendance since 1984.)
- Low attendance: 10,515; Salford Red Devils, 27 February

Top scorers
- Tries: Mikey Lewis (21)
- Goals: Arthur Mourgue (75)
- Points: Arthur Mourgue (188)
Home colours	Away colours
← 2024	List of seasons	2026 →

The 2025 season was Hull Kingston Rovers' ninth consecutive season playing in England's top division of rugby league. They competed in the 2025 Super League season and the 2025 Challenge Cup, securing a historic first treble.

== Preseason friendlies ==
On 28 May 2024, the club announced that they would face York Knights in the Rugby League Amsterdam Challenge, a pre-season friendly held at the NRCA Stadium in Amsterdam on 25 January 2025. The match, organised in partnership with the Netherlands Rugby League Bond, aims to develop rugby league in the Netherlands, and was later confirmed to be the club's only pre-season friendly of 2025.

Date and time	Versus	H/A	Venue	Result	Score	Tries	Goals	Attendance	Report
25 January; 12:30 (GMT)	York Knights	N	NRCA Stadium	L	12–26	Gorman, Tennison	Richardson (2/2)	2,715	

== Super League ==
=== Fixtures ===
Date and time	Round	Versus	H/A	Venue	Result	Score	Tries	Goals	Attendance	TV	Pos.	Report
14 February; 20:00	Round 1	Castleford Tigers	H	Craven Park	W	19–18 (g.p.)	Burgess (3), Hiku	Martin (1/4); Drop-goals: Lewis	11,020	Sky Sports Action	5th	
20 February; 20:00	Round 2	Wakefield Trinity	A	Belle Vue	W	14–12	Davies, Lewis	Martin (2/2 + 1 pen.)	8,065	Sky Sports Action	4th	
27 February; 20:00	Round 3	Salford Red Devils	H	Craven Park	W	42–0	Whitbread (2), Tanginoa, Gildart, Davies, Broadbent, Richardson, Litten	Martin (1/2), Richardson (3/4 + 2 pen.)	10,515	Sky Sports +	2nd	
7 March; 20:00	Round 4	St Helens	A	Totally Wicked Stadium	W	20–10	Gildart (2), Lewis, Davies	Lewis (2/4)	11,438	Sky Sports Action	1st	
23 March; 15:00	Round 5	Leigh Leopards	H	Craven Park	W	30–0	Lewis (2), Gildart, Tanginoa, Davies	Lewis (4/5 + 1 pen.)	11,231	Sky Sports +	1st	
30 March; 15:00	Round 6	Huddersfield Giants	A	Kirklees Stadium	W	50–4	Lewis (3), Litten (2), Gildart, Mourgue, Whitbread, Davies	Mourgue (7/9)	5,015	Sky Sports +	1st	
11 April; 20:00	Round 7	Wigan Warriors	H	Craven Park	L	12–28	Burgess, Hiku	Mourgue (2/2)	11,000+ (Note: No exact attendance figure released.)	Sky Sports Action	1st	
18 April, 12:30 (Good Friday)	Round 8 (Rivals Round)	Hull F.C.	A	MKM Stadium	W	28–14	Gildart, Hiku, Mourgue, Batchelor, Waerea-Hargreaves	Mourgue (3/4), Lewis (1/1)	21,018	Sky Sports Main Event	1st	
25 April, 20:00	Round 9	Leeds Rhinos	A	Headingley Rugby Stadium	W	20–14	Broadbent (2), Batchelor, Lewis	Mourgue (1/4 + 1 pen.)	16,863	Sky Sports Action	1st	
3 May; 17:15	Round 10 (Magic Weekend)	Salford Red Devils	N	St James' Park	W	54–0	Litten (2), Mourgue (2), Hadley, Luckley, Hiku, Batchelor, Booth	Mourgue (9/9)	31,294 (Note: Attendance recorded across three fixtures.)	Sky Sports Action	1st	
17 May; 17:30 (Note: Kick-off changed from 15:00 to prevent clashing with the 2025 FA Cup final.)	Round 11	Huddersfield Giants	H	Craven Park	W	34–0	Burgess (2), Lewis, May, Tanginoa, Brown	Mourgue (5/6)	10,764	Sky Sports +	1st	
23 May; 20:00	Round 12	Warrington Wolves	A	Halliwell Jones Stadium	W	31–12	Davies (2), Broadbent, Lewis, Burgess, May	Mourgue (3/6); Drop-goals: Lewis	9,972	Sky Sports Action	1st	
30 May; 20:00	Round 13	St Helens	H	Craven Park	W	34–4	Broadbent (2), Lewis (2), Hiku, Minchella	Mourgue (5/6)	11,087	Sky Sports Action	1st	
13 June; 20:00	Round 14	Catalans Dragons	H	Craven Park	W	68–6	Batchelor (2), Sue (2), Lewis (2), Davies, Tanginoa, Broadbent, Booth, Whitbread, May	Mourgue (10/12)	11,350	Sky Sports +	1st	
19 June; 20:00	Round 15	Castleford Tigers	A	Wheldon Road	W	48–0	Booth (3), Davies (2), Mourgue, Whitbread, Hiku, Broadbent	Mourgue (6/9)	7,650	Sky Sports Action	1st	
27 June; 20:00	Round 16	Wakefield Trinity	H	Craven Park	W	34–10	Davies (3), Burgess, Lewis, Hiku	Mourgue (5/6)		Sky Sports +	1st	
6 July; 15:00	Round 17	Leeds Rhinos	H	Craven Park	L	8–14	Martin	Mourgue (1/1 + 1 pen.)		Sky Sports Action	1st	
12 July; 15:00	Round 18	Leigh Leopards	A	Leigh Sports Village	L	10–28	May, Tanginoa	Mourgue (1/2)		Sky Sports + BBC iPlayer	1st	
19 July; 18:00 (BST)	Round 19	Catalans Dragons	A	Stade Gilbert Brutus	W	34–6	Broadbent (2), Lewis (2), Burgess (2)	Mourgue (5/6)		Sky Sports Action	1st	
31 July; 20:00	Round 20	Salford Red Devils	A	Salford Community Stadium	W	74–12	Burgess (4) Davies (2), Martin (2), Litten (2), Broadbent, Sue, Lewis, Mourgue	Mourgue (2/4), Martin (6/9 + 1 pen.)		Sky Sports Action	1st	
9 August; 15:00	Round 21	Castleford Tigers	H	Craven Park	W	36–6	Burgess (3), Litten, Martin, Lewis, Mourgue	Mourgue (4/7)	11,038	Sky Sports +	1st	
15 August; 20:00	Round 22	Wigan Warriors	A	Brick Community Stadium	W	10–6	Hadley	Martin (1/1 + 2 pen.)	20,218	Sky Sports Action	1st	
21 August; 20:00	Round 23	Leeds Rhinos	A	Headingley Rugby Stadium	L	6–28	Davies	Martin (1/1)	16,260	Sky Sports Action	1st	
29 August; 20:00	Round 24	St Helens	H	Craven Park	W	12–8	Burgess	Martin (0/1 + 4 pen.)	12,169	Sky Sports Action	1st	
7 September; 15:05 (Note: Kick-off delayed by five minutes to accommodate nationwide test of UK Emergency Alert System.)	Round 25	Hull F.C.	H	Craven Park	W	18–4	Booth, Litten, Broadbent, Davies	Mourgue (1/4)	12,338	Sky Sports Action	1st	
13 September; 17:30	Round 26	Wakefield Trinity	A	Belle Vue	L	12–28	Mourgue, Gildart	Mourgue (2/2)	9,258	Sky Sports Action	1st	
18 September; 20:00	Round 27	Warrington Wolves	H	Craven Park	W	28–20	Booth (2), May (2), Mourgue	Martin (4/5)	11,769	Sky Sports Main Event	1st	

=== Table ===
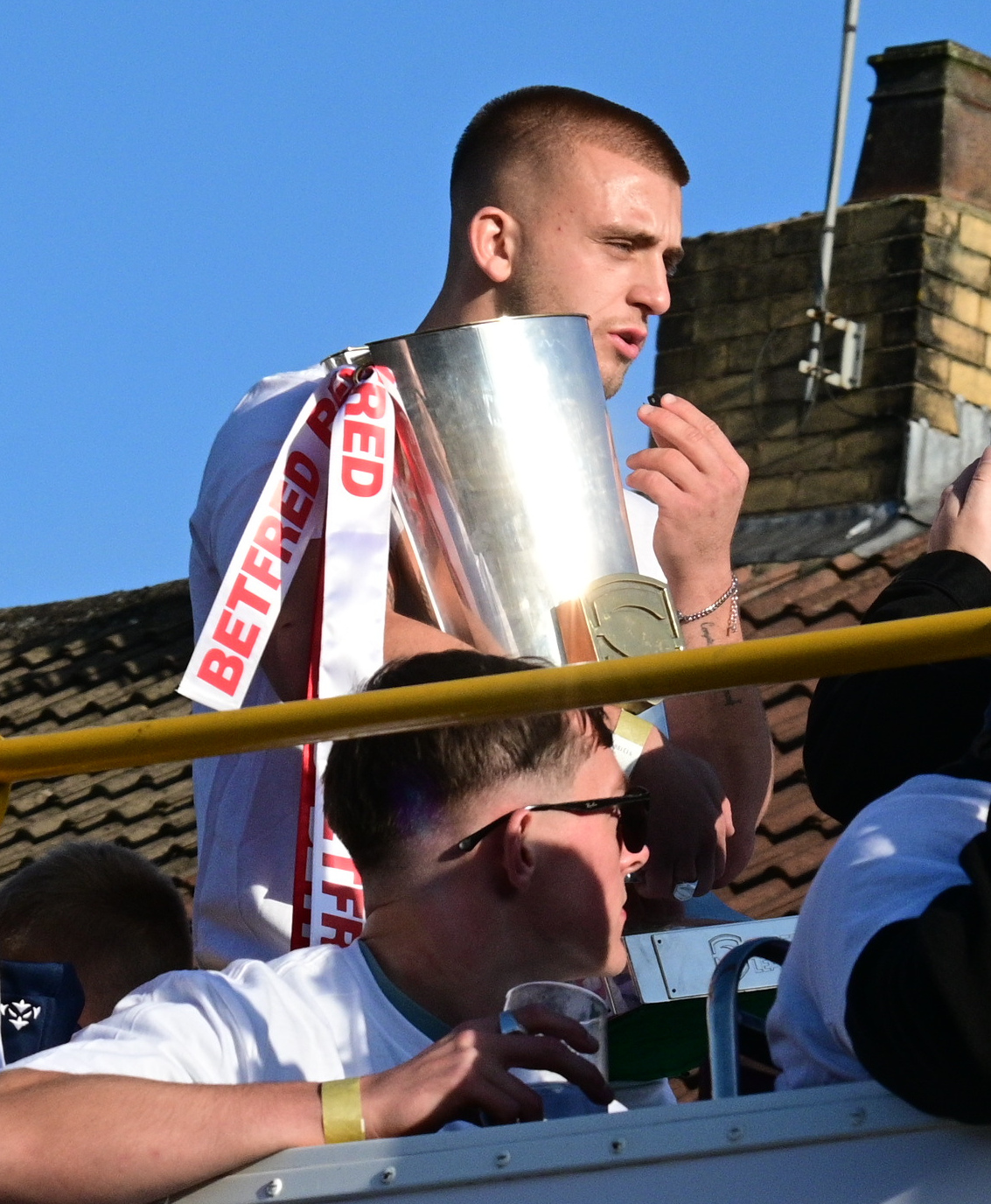
Mikey Lewis holding the Super League Trophy after Hull Kingston Rovers' 2025 Super League Grand Final victory

Pos	Team	Pld	W	D	L	PF	PA	PD	Pts	Qualification
1	Hull Kingston Rovers (L, C)	27	22	0	5	786	292	+494	44	Advance to Semi-finals
2	Wigan Warriors	27	21	0	6	794	333	+461	42	Advance to Semi-finals
3	Leigh Leopards	27	19	1	7	619	452	+167	39	Advance to Eliminators
4	Leeds Rhinos	27	18	0	9	610	310	+300	36	Advance to Eliminators
5	St Helens	27	17	0	10	677	314	+363	34	Advance to Eliminators
6	Wakefield Trinity (Note: Salford forfeited their game against Wakefield. Under RFL operational rules, the game is recorded as a 48–0 victory for Wakefield, and converse loss for Salford, with the points scored and conceded applying to both teams.)	27	15	0	12	688	458	+230	30	Advance to Eliminators
7	Hull FC	27	13	1	13	539	461	+78	27	
8	Warrington Wolves	27	10	0	17	480	641	−161	20	
9	Catalans Dragons	27	10	0	17	425	652	−227	20	
10	Huddersfield Giants	27	7	0	20	347	738	−391	14	
11	Castleford Tigers	27	6	0	21	396	815	−419	12	
12	Salford Red Devils (R)	27	3	0	24	234	1129	−895	4 (Note: On 22 September 2025, Salford Red Devils were deducted two points breaching "a number of RFL operational rules" surrounding their team selection for their Round 1 fixture against St Helens on 15 February 2025.)	Relegated to Championship

(C) Champions; (L) League Leaders' Shield Winners; (R) Relegated

=== Play-offs ===
Date and time	Round	Versus	H/A	Venue	Result	Score	Tries	Goals	Attendance	TV	Report
3 October; 20:00	Semi-finals	St Helens	H	Craven Park	W	20–12	Gildart (2), Lewis, Burgess	Mourgue (1/2 + 1 pen.), Martin (0/3)	12,235	BBC Two; Sky Sports Action	
11 October; 18:00	Grand Final	Wigan Warriors	N	Old Trafford	W	24–6	Burgess (2), Lewis, Litten	Mourgue (1/1), Martin (2/3 + 1 pen.)	68,853	Sky Sports Main Event	

== Challenge Cup ==
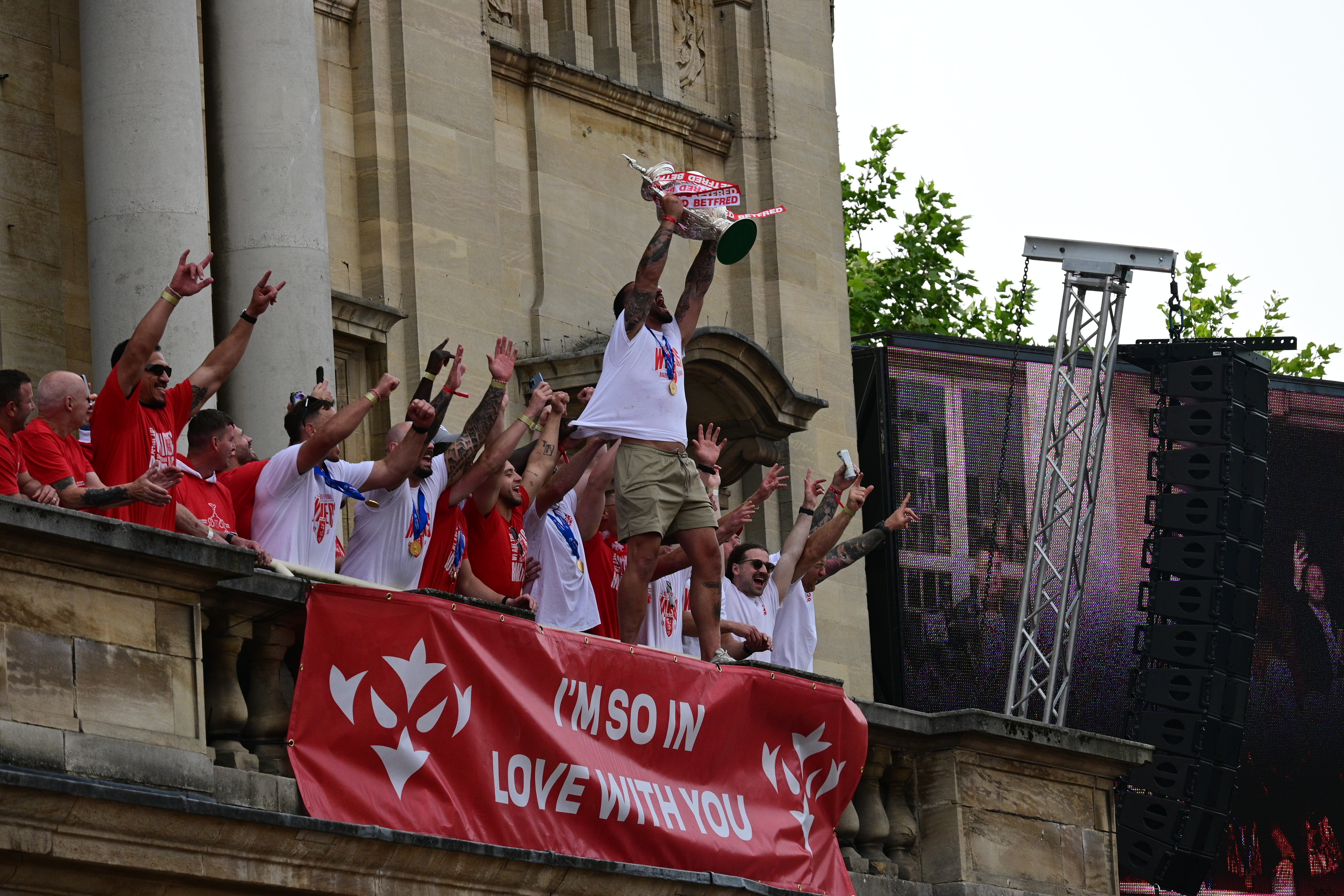
Elliot Minchella and the Hull Kingston Rovers squad celebrate lifting the Challenge Cup at Hull City Hall

On 25 June 2024, the RFL announced a change to the Challenge Cup format, totalling 7 rounds compared to the previous 9, with Super League teams entering to play away from home at round 3.

Hull Kingston Rovers were first drawn on 14 January to play the York Knights away in Round 3, with the fixture being the last to be confirmed following York's delayed Round 2 72–12 victory against the Keighley Cougars on 2 February. Following their victory against York, Hull Kingston Rovers beat Oldham R.L.F.C. 40–0 at home on 14 March, entering them into the quarter-finals; Hull Kingston Rovers, for the first time since the first round of the 1985–86 Challenge Cup, were drawn in a Hull Derby to play Hull F.C. away at the MKM Stadium on 5 April.

After winning 32–16 in the quarter-final derby, Hull Kingston Rovers returned to the York Community Stadium to play the Catalans Dragons in the semi-finals on 10 May. A 36–12 victory over Catalans qualified Hull Kingston Rovers to play in the 2025 Challenge Cup final at Wembley Stadium, and following a closely-contended match against the Warrington Wolves, Hull Kingston Rovers won the final 8-6, winning their first Challenge Cup since 1980 and ending a 40-year trophy drought since the club won the 1984–85 John Player Special Trophy.

Date and time	Round	Versus	H/A	Venue	Result	Score	Tries	Goals	Attendance	TV	Report
7 February; 19:30	Round 3	York Knights	A	York Community Stadium	W	44–2	Martin (2), Lewis (2), Hiku, Davies, Evalds, Tanginoa	Martin (6/8)	5,369	The Sportsman	
14 March; 20:00	Round 4	Oldham R.L.F.C.	H	Craven Park	W	40–0	Gildart (2), Davies, Whitbread, Kershaw, Leyland, Broadbent	Richardson (6/7)	Unknown{ (Note: No exact attendance figure released.)	Not televised	
5 April; 14:30	Quarter-finals	Hull F.C.	A	MKM Stadium	W	32–16	Burgess (2), Davies, Broadbent, Litten	Litten (5/5 + 1 pen.)	20,226	BBC One	
10 May; 14:30	Semi-finals	Catalans Dragons	N	York Community Stadium	W	36–12	Batchelor (2), Broadbent (2), Lewis, Burgess	Lewis (5/6 + 1 pen.)	8,402	BBC One	
7 June; 15:00	Final	Warrington Wolves	N	Wembley Stadium	W	8–6	Davies	Lewis (1/1 + 1 pen.)	63,278	BBC One	

== Transfers ==
=== Gains ===
Player	Club	Contract	Date
(New Zealand) Jared Waerea-Hargreaves	Sydney Roosters	1 Year	February 2024
(England) Jack Brown	Hull FC	2 Years	May 2024
(England) Tom Davies	Catalans Dragons	3 Years	June 2024
(Nigeria) Eribe Doro	Bradford Bulls	2 Years	June 2024
(England) Bill Leyland	London Broncos	2 Years	July 2024
(England) Michael McIlorum	Catalans Dragons	1 Year	July 2024
(England) Danny Richardson	Castleford Tigers	2 Years	August 2024
(Papua New Guinea) Rhyse Martin	Leeds Rhinos	2 Years	August 2024
(England) Lee Kershaw	London Broncos	2 Years	November 2024
(England) Leon Ruan	Leeds Rhinos	2 Years	December 2024
(England) Noah Booth	Wakefield Trinity	4 Years	January 2025
(France) Arthur Mourgue	Catalans Dragons	3 1/2 Years	March 2025

==== Loans in ====
Player	Club	Loan period	Date
(England) Cobie Wainhouse	Hull F.C.	End of season	August 2025
(England) Rowan Milnes	Castleford Tigers	Two weeks	August 2025

=== Losses ===
Player	Club	Contract	Date
(England) Ryan Hall	Leeds Rhinos	1 Year	April 2024
(Turkey) Yusuf Aydin	Hull FC	2 Years	May 2024
(Ireland) Louis Senior	Castleford Tigers	2 Years	May 2024
(England) Jordan Abdull	Hull FC	3 Years	June 2024
(England) Ben Reynolds	Featherstone Rovers	2 Years	July 2024
(England) Matty Storton	Wakefield Trinity	3 Years	August 2024
(Australia) Tom Opacic	N/A	Released	August 2024
(England) Harvey Moore	N/A	Released	September 2024
(Ireland) George King	Huddersfield Giants	4 Years	October 2024
(England) Reiss Butterworth	Sheffield Eagles	2 Years	November 2024
(Australia) Matt Parcell	N/A	Retirement	November 2024
(England) Danny Richardson	York Knights	End of season	August 2025
(England) Niall Evalds	Huddersfield Giants	2 Years (Note: Evalds was initially signed to Huddersfield on an end-of-season loan in March 2025.)	August 2025
(England) Connor Barley	Featherstone Rovers	End of season	September 2025

==== Loans out ====
Player	Club	Loan period	Date
(England) Noah Booth	Hunslet	End of season (Note: Recalled in April 2025 to appear in first team against Wigan Warriors.)	January 2025
(England) Neil Tchamambe	Wakefield Trinity	End of season	January 2025
(England) Lennie Ellis	Goole Vikings	Six weeks	February 2025
(England) Zach Fishwick	Hunslet	Three weeks	February 2025
(Jamaica) Ajahni Wallace	Sheffield Eagles	One month	April 2025
(England) Lee Kershaw	Castleford Tigers	Two weeks (Note: Kershaw had already been loaned to Castleford on a two-week deal in March, however he was recalled to Hull Kingston Rovers for Round 4 of the Challenge Cup due to a high number of squad injuries.)	April 2025
(Nigeria) Eribe Doro	Bradford Bulls	Two weeks	April 2025
(England) Harvey Horne	Sheffield Eagles	End of season (Note: Recalled from loan for unknown reason.)	April 2025
(Jamaica) Ajahni Wallace	Toulouse Olympique	End of season	June 2025
(England) Danny Richardson	Salford Red Devils	Two weeks (Note: Recalled from loan after one week due to cover for Mikey Lewis, who had failed a head injury assessment in the fixture against Leeds Rhinos on 6 July.)	June 2025
(England) Harvey Horne	Doncaster R.L.F.C.	Two weeks	July 2025
(England) Leon Ruan	Salford Red Devils	One week (Note: By special dispensation of the RFL; minimum loan period is usually two weeks.)	August 2025
(Ireland) Louix Gorman	Salford Red Devils	One week	August 2025

== Squad ==
2025 Hull Kingston Rovers Squad
First team squad			Coaching staff
2 (England) Tom Davies – WG; 3 (New Zealand) Peta Hiku – CE; 4 (England) Oliver Gildart – CE; 5 (England) Joe Burgess – WG; 6 (England) Mikey Lewis – SO (Note: Shirt number 6 had originally been retired by the club in 2017 following the death of former player and coach Roger Millward, however it was revived for use by Mikey Lewis in December 2024.); 7 (Samoa) Tyrone May – HB; 8 (Samoa) Sauaso Sue – PR; 9 (England) Jez Litten – HK; 10 (New Zealand) Jared Waerea-Hargreaves – PR; 11 (England) Dean Hadley – SR; 12 (England) James Batchelor – SR; 13 (England) Elliot Minchella (c) – LF	14 (England) Michael McIlorum – HK; 15 (Scotland) Sam Luckley – PR, LF, SR; 16 (Australia) Jai Whitbread – PR; 17 (Papua New Guinea) Rhyse Martin – SR, LF, CE (gk); 18 (England) Jack Broadbent – CE, SO, FB, WG; 19 (England) Danny Richardson – SH, SO; 20 (Australia) Kelepi Tanginoa – PR, SR, LF; 21 (England) Jack Brown – LF; 22 (Australia) Phoenix Laulu-Togaga'e – FB, WG; 23 (England) Lee Kershaw – WG	24 (Nigeria) Eribe Doro – PR; 25 (England) Bill Leyland – HK; 27 (England) Leon Ruan – SR; 28 (England) Zach Fishwick – PR; 29 (Ireland) Louix Gorman – WG, FB; 30 (England) Leo Tennison – PR; 31 (England) Lennie Ellis – HK; 33 (England) Harvey Horne – WG; 35 (France) Arthur Mourgue – FB, HB, HK (gk); 36 (England) Noah Booth – CE, FB, SO	Head coach: (Australia) Willie Peters; Assistant coaches: (England) David Hodgson; (England) Danny Ward; Legend: (c) Captain(s); (vc) Vice-captain(s); (red card) = suspended; = injured; (gk) = Goal kicker; Updated: 11 October 2025; Source(s): Hull KR announce 2025 Squad Numbers, Backroom Staff
