= Jared Waerea-Hargreaves =

New Zealand international rugby league footballer (born 1989)

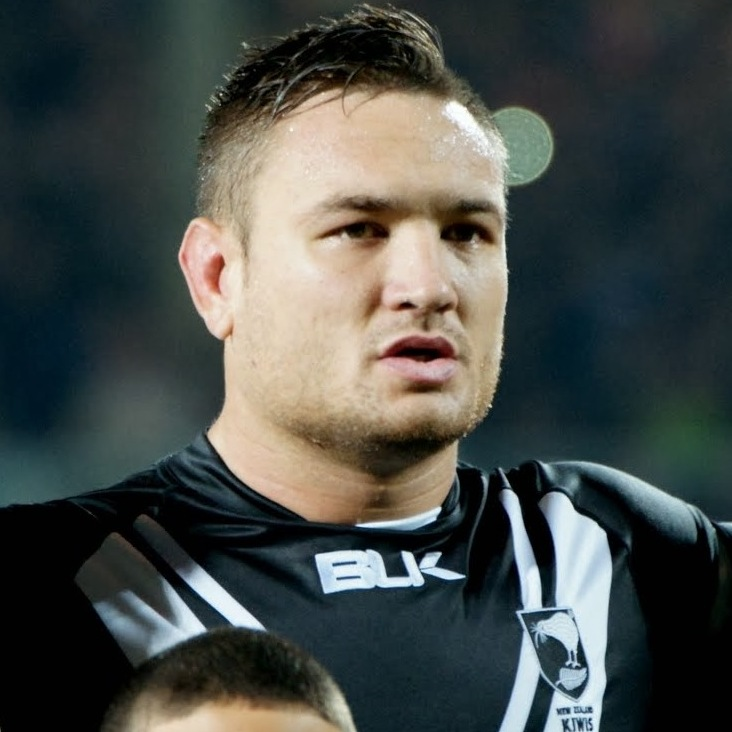

Personal information
- Full name: Jared Waerea Hargreaves
- Born: 20 January 1989 (age 37) Rotorua, New Zealand
- Height: 193 cm (6 ft 4 in)
- Weight: 116 kg (18 st 4 lb)

Playing information
- Position: Prop
Club
Years	Team	Pld	T	G	FG	P
2009	Manly Sea Eagles	6	1	0	0	4
2010–24	Sydney Roosters	310	15	0	0	60
2025	Hull Kingston Rovers	24	1	0	0	4
	Total	340	17	0	0	68
Representative
Years	Team	Pld	T	G	FG	P
2009–25	New Zealand	33	2	0	0	8
2012–15	NRL All Stars	2	0	0	0	0
- Source: As of 11 October 2025

Jared Waerea-Hargreaves (born 20 January 1989) is a former New Zealand professional rugby league footballer who last played as a prop for Hull Kingston Rovers in the Super League and New Zealand at international level.

Waerea-Hargreaves started his NRL career at the Manly-Warringah Sea Eagles. He was recruited by the Sydney Roosters, in 2010 and played in that year's Grand Final loss to St. George-Illawarra. He was a member of the Sydney Roosters winning Grand Final sides in 2013, 2018 and 2019. He has also played for the NRL All Stars.

== Early years ==
Waerea-Hargreaves was born in Rotorua, New Zealand, and is of Māori and English descent. He moved to Brisbane, Queensland with his mother when he was nine-years-old.

Waerea-Hargreaves first made a name for himself playing schoolboy rugby union at Iona College (Queensland), through some impressive performances in the AIC competition, making the AIC rep side which played the GPS rep side. Waerea-Hargreaves joined the Waratahs Academy in Sydney. Waerea-Hargreaves played for Australia at the 2007 Under 19 Rugby World Championship in Ireland alongside future-Super Rugby players, such as Dan Palmer, Pat McCabe and Blair Connor.

== Club career ==
=== Manly Warringah Sea Eagles ===
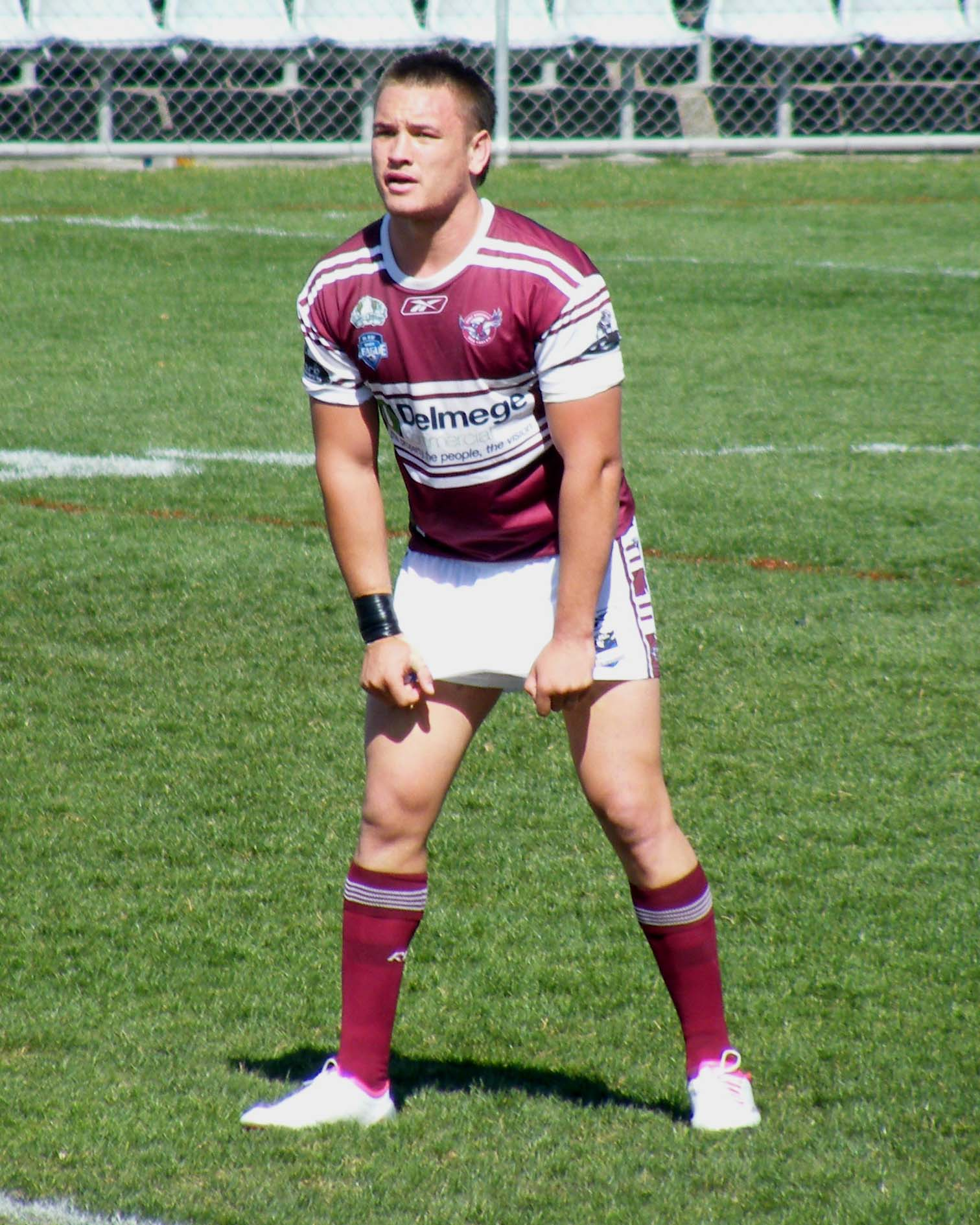
Waerea-Hargreaves playing for the Manly Sea Eagles in 2008

Waerea-Hargreaves was signed by the Manly-Warringah Sea Eagles recruitment manager, Noel Cleal, despite never having played rugby league.

Waerea-Hargreaves played in the Sea Eagles NYC team in 2008 and 2009.

Waerea-Hargreaves made his NRL debut against the Brisbane Broncos in round 9, playing off the interchange bench in the Sea Eagles 22–20 win at Suncorp Stadium. In his next match, in round 15, Waerea-Hargreaves scored his first NRL career try in the Sea Eagles 20–14 victory over the Canberra Raiders at Brookvale Oval. Waerea-Hargreaves played 6 matches and scored a try during the season. He was also named in the Toyota Cup team of the year.

=== Sydney Roosters ===
==== 2010 ====
Waerea-Hargreaves joined the Sydney Roosters in 2010 on a three-year deal. In week 1 of the finals, against Wests Tigers, Waerea-Hargreaves was on a receiving end of big hit from Simon Dwyer. The Roosters won 19–15 in golden point extra time due to a Shaun Kenny-Dowall 70-metre intercept try. Waerea-Hargreaves played off the interchange bench in the 2010 NRL Grand Final, losing 32–8 to the St George-Illawarra Dragons. He played in 19 matches for the Roosters in 2010.

==== 2011 ====
In round 25, against the Cronulla-Sutherland Sharks, Waerea-Hargreaves scored his first club try for the Roosters in the 36–25 win at the SFS. He played in 21 matches and scored a try for the season.

==== 2012 ====
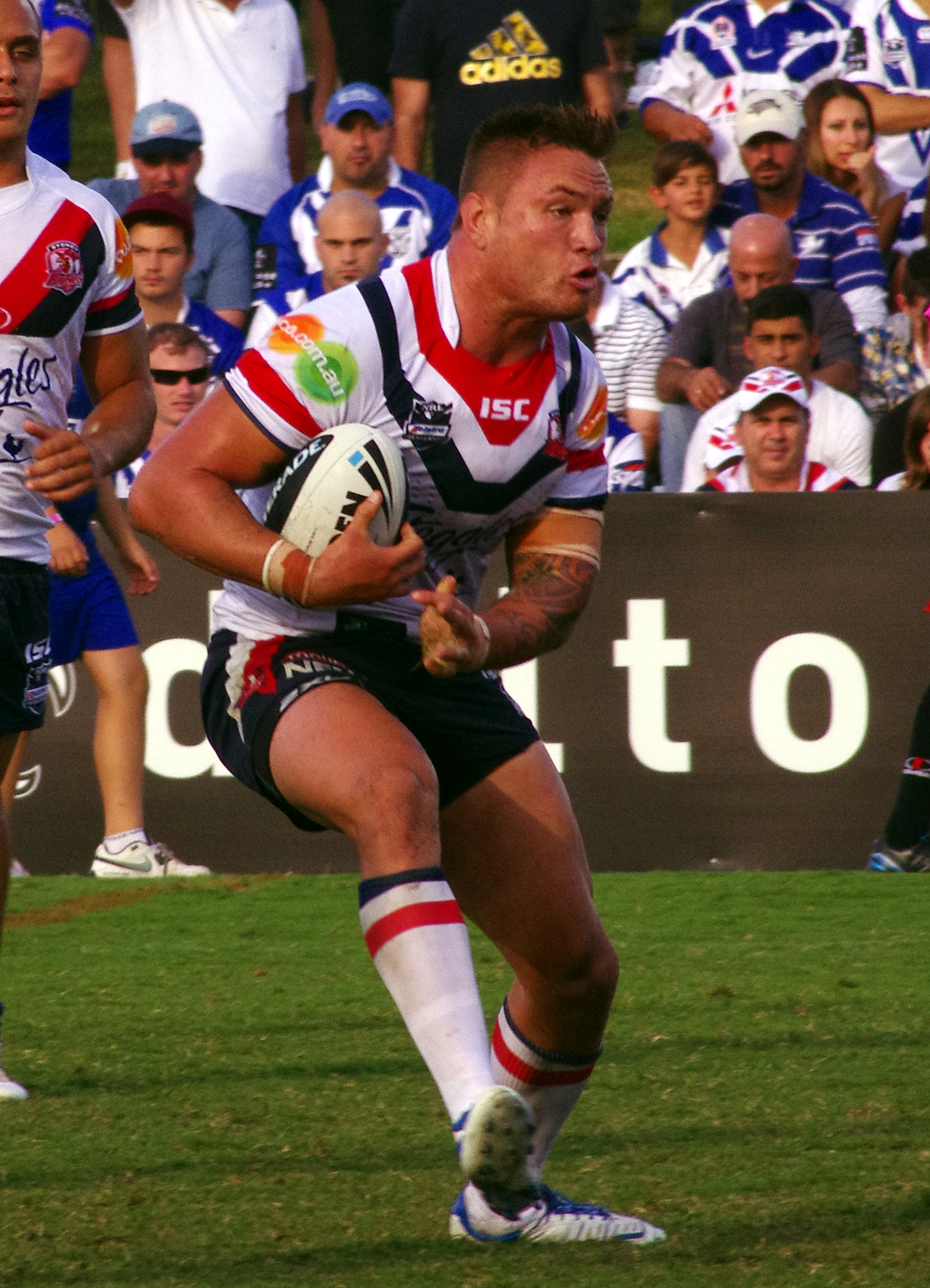
Waerea-Hargreaves playing for the Sydney Roosters in 2012

On 6 February, Waerea-Hargreaves played for the NRL All Stars on the interchange bench in the 28–12 win over the Indigenous All Stars.

He played in 23 matches and scored 3 tries in 2012.

==== 2013 ====
In round 9, he copped a 5-week suspension after being sent off for a head tackle against the Sea Eagles. Waerea-Hargreaves played prop in his second grand final against the Sea Eagles, the Roosters winning 26–18. Waerea-Hargreaves played in 21 matches and scored a try in the Roosters' successful season.

==== 2014 ====
In round 11, against the Canterbury-Bankstown Bulldogs at ANZ Stadium, Waerea-Hargreaves played his 100th NRL career match in the Roosters 32–12 win. In round 19, against the Penrith Panthers at the SFS, he played his 100th match for the Roosters in the 32–12 win. Waerea-Hargreaves finished off the 2014 season with him playing in 26 matches and scoring a try. In December, the Canberra Raiders offered Waerea-Hargreaves a multimillion-dollar contract but ended negotiations after he failed to meet a deadline.

==== 2015 ====
On 24 January, Waerea-Hargreaves was the co-captain of Roosters 2015 Auckland Nines squad alongside Mitchell Pearce. On 13 February, he played for the NRL All Stars in the 2015 All Stars match. The NRL All Stars lost 20–6 to the Indigenous All Stars. In round 23, against the Parramatta Eels, Waerea-Hargreaves scored one of the best solo tries of the season, scoring a crucial try by steamrolling two defenders and brushed off two more to score next to the posts in the Roosters 28–18 win. In the next match against the Brisbane Broncos, his season ended after he suffered a knee injury. Waerea-Hargreaves finished the year with him playing in 19 matches and scoring 2 tries.

==== 2016 ====
In round 9, against the Newcastle Knights, Waerea-Hargreaves made his return for the Roosters from injury, playing off the interchange bench in the 38–0 win at the Sydney Football Stadium. Waerea-Hargreaves finished the 2016 NRL season with him playing in 14 matches for the Roosters.

==== 2017 ====
Waerea-Hargreaves played in every game of the 2017 NRL season for the Roosters as the club fell one game short of a grand final appearance suffering a shock defeat by North Queensland in the preliminary final 29–16.

==== 2018 ====
Waerea-Hargreaves was part of the Easts side which won their 4th minor premiership in 6 seasons. On 30 September, Waerea-Hargreaves played in Eastern Suburbs 21–6 victory over Melbourne in the 2018 NRL Grand Final winning his second premiership as a player.

==== 2019 ====
In round 17 against North Queensland, Waerea-Hargreaves was placed on report in the club's 15–12 loss at the Central Coast Stadium after allegedly headbutting North Queensland player Josh McGuire. Waerea-Hargreaves was later cleared of any wrongdoing but was initially facing a two match ban. In round 25 against arch rivals South Sydney, Waerea-Hargreaves was placed on report after hitting Souths player Liam Knight with a late tackle around the head which left Knight bleeding on the ground. The Roosters would go on to lose the match 16–10 at ANZ Stadium.

In the qualifying final against South Sydney, Waerea-Hargreaves was placed on report and later suspended for one match after being found guilty of tripping Souths player James Roberts. Waerea-Hargreaves missed the club's preliminary final victory over Melbourne but played in the 2019 NRL Grand Final where the Sydney Roosters won the match 14–8 against the Canberra Raiders at ANZ Stadium. It was the club's second consecutive premiership and the third premiership for Waerea-Hargreaves as a player.

On 22 November 2019, it was announced that Waerea-Hargreaves had signed a three-year contract extension to keep him at the club until the end of the 2023 season.

==== 2020 ====
Waerea-Hargreaves played 18 games for the club in the 2020 NRL season. They fell short of a third successive premiership losing to Canberra in the elimination final.

==== 2021 ====
Waerea-Hargreaves played a total of 23 games for the Sydney Roosters in the 2021 NRL season including the club's two finals matches. The Sydney Roosters would be eliminated from the second week of the finals losing to Manly 42-6.

==== 2022 ====
In round 24 of the 2022 NRL season, Waerea-Hargreaves was sent to the sin bin for a dangerous high tackle during the Sydney Roosters upset victory over Melbourne. In the elimination final, Waerea-Hargreaves was sent to the sin bin for a dangerous tackle in the club's upset defeat to arch-rivals South Sydney which ended their season. In the third group stage match at the 2021 Rugby League World Cup, Waerea-Hargreaves was sent to the sin bin for a stiff arm to the head of Dan Norman during New Zealand's 48-10 victory over the Republic of Ireland.

==== 2023 ====
Waerea-Hargreaves signed a one-year extension with the club for the 2024 season. In round 26 of the 2023 NRL season, Waerea-Hargreaves was placed on report for a high tackle on Wests Tigers player Apisai Koroisau. Waerea-Hargreaves was later suspended for seven matches, which ended his season.

==== 2024 ====
On 20 February 2024, Waerea-Hargreaves announced he would depart the Sydney Roosters following the season's conclusion.

In round 10 of the 2024 NRL season, Waerea-Hargreaves played his 300th game for the Sydney Roosters in their 38-18 victory over the New Zealand Warriors. Waerea-Hargreaves would go outright first for most games played for the club during their round 18 match against St. George Illawarra. Waerea-Hargreaves was sin binned during the game. Waerea-Hargreaves played 18 games for the Sydney Roosters in his final season at the club including their preliminary final defeat against Melbourne.

=== Hull Kingston Rovers ===
A day after announcing his departure from Sydney Roosters, he had signed for Hull Kingston Rovers effective for 2025. In April, Waerea-Hargreaves announced he would retire following the 2025 season.

On 7 June, he played in Hull Kingston Rovers 8-6 2025 Challenge Cup final victory over Warrington Wolves, winning Hull KR's first major trophy in 40 years.

On 18 September, Waerea-Hargeaves played in Hull Kingston Rovers final game of the regular season to claim the League Leaders Shield in victory over Warrington

Waerea-Hargreaves ended his career as treble winners with Hull Kingston Rovers after defeating Wigan Warriors 24-6 in the 2025 Super League Grand Final to claim club's first league title in 40 years and first of the Super League era.

== International career ==
He was selected as part of the New Zealand national rugby league team Four Nations squad and made his debut against Tonga. Waerea-Hargreaves scored two tries against France in the Kiwis 62–12 win at Stade Ernest Wallon.

He was selected to play for New Zealand from the interchange bench in the ANZAC Test, in their 12–8 loss.

Waerea-Hargreaves played a match for New Zealand in the Four Nations, a 76–12 victory over Papua New Guinea.

Waerea-Hargreaves was selected in the New Zealand Four Nations squad.

Waerea-Hargreaves played off the interchange bench in the October test against Australia.

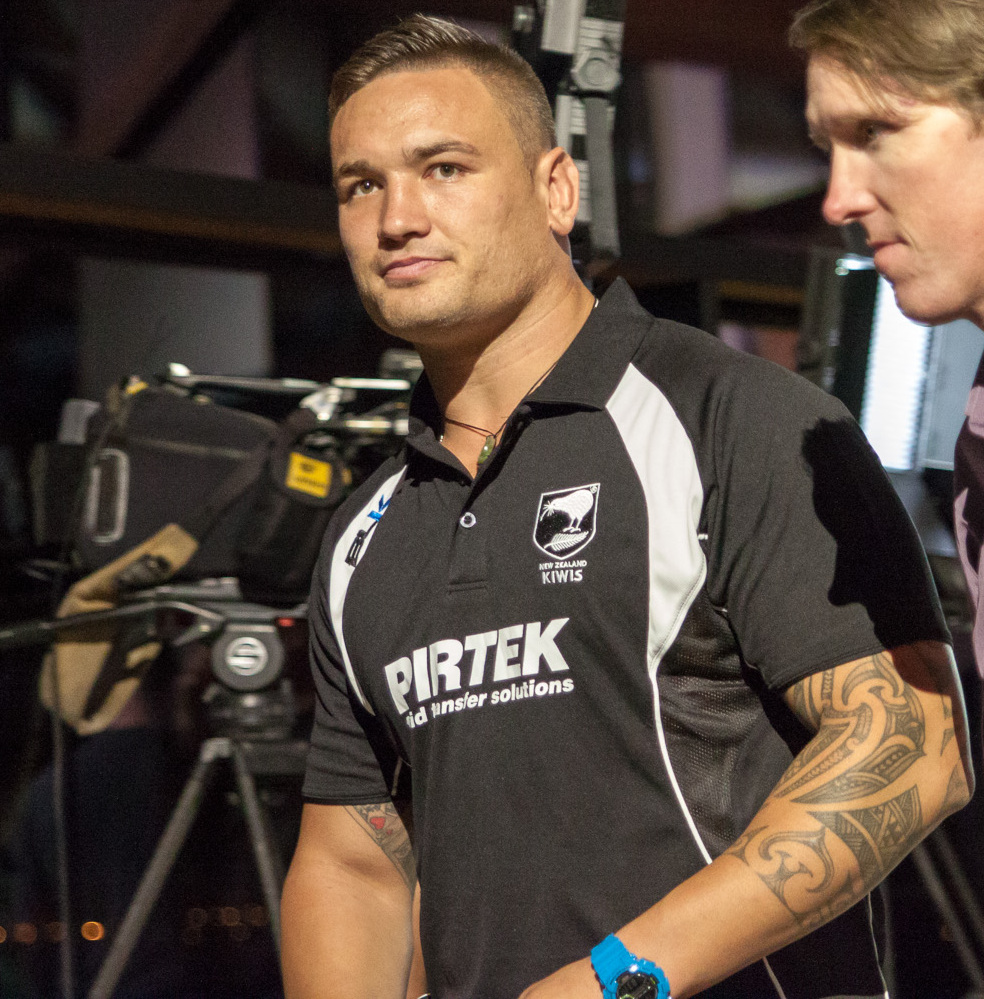
Waerea-Hargreaves on media duty for the Kiwis ahead of the 2013 ANZAC Test

For the 2013 ANZAC Test, Waerea-Hargreaves played for New Zealand at prop in their 32–12 loss.

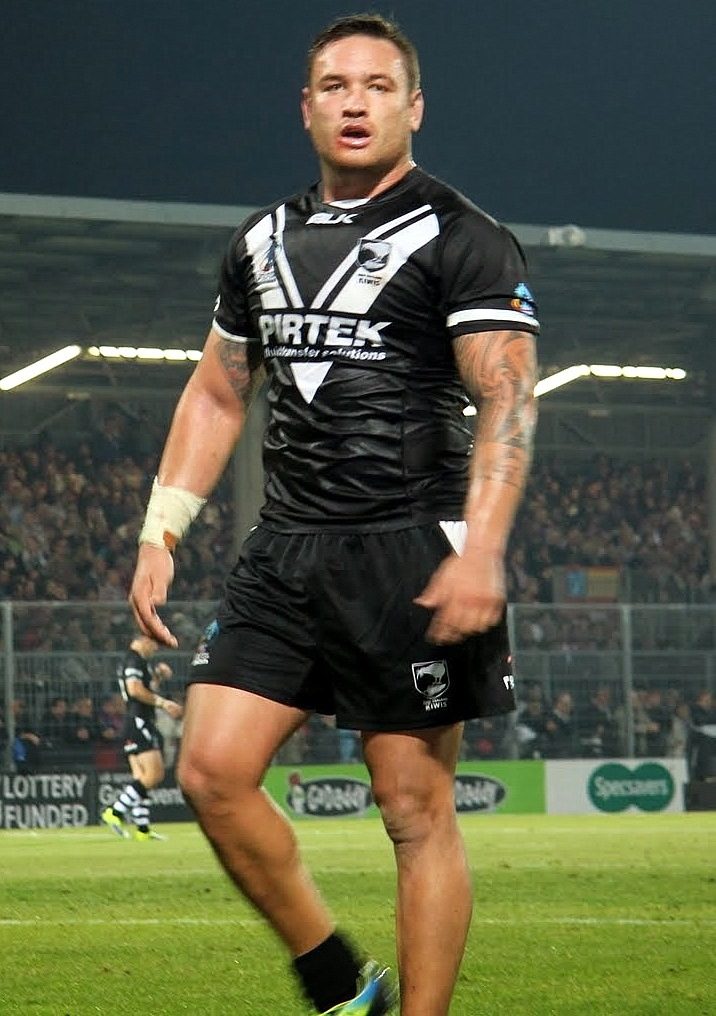
Waerea-Hargreaves playing for the Kiwis at the 2013 RLWC

He played for the Kiwis in all 7 matches of the World Cup including the 34–2 loss to Australia in the final.

On 6 September 2016, Waerea-Hargreaves was added to the New Zealand national rugby league team train-on squad for the 2016 Four Nations.

== Post playing ==
In September 2025, it was reported at Hargreaves would return to the Roosters in a mentor role following his retirement from rugby league.

== Statistics ==
Year	Team	Games	Tries	Pts
2009	Manly Warringah Sea Eagles	6	1	4
2010	Sydney Roosters	19		
2011	Sydney Roosters	21	1	4
2012	Sydney Roosters	23	3	12
2013	Sydney Roosters	21	1	4
2014	Sydney Roosters	26	1	4
2015	Sydney Roosters	19	2	8
2016	Sydney Roosters	14		
2017	Sydney Roosters	26		
2018	Sydney Roosters	24	2	8
2019	Sydney Roosters	20	1	4
2020	Sydney Roosters	18	1	4
2021	Sydney Roosters	23		
2022	Sydney Roosters	20	3	12
2023	Sydney Roosters	17		
2024	Sydney Roosters	18		
2025	Hull KR	24	1	4
	Totals	321	16	64
