= Tom Whitehead (rugby league) =

English rugby league footballer (born 2002)

Personal information
- Full name: Thomas Whitehead
- Born: 7 November 2002 (age 23) Oldham, Greater Manchester, England

Playing information
- Position: Second-row, Loose forward
Club
Years	Team	Pld	T	G	FG	P
2022–25	Warrington Wolves	11	1	0	0	4
2022(loan)	→ Rochdale Hornets	3	1	0	0	4
2023(loan)	→ Swinton Lions	1	0	0	0	0
2023(loan)	→ North Wales Crusaders	6	2	0	0	8
2024(DR)	→ Widnes Vikings	2	0	0	0	0
2025(loan)	→ Keighley Cougars	2	0	0	0	0
2025(DR)	→ London Broncos	1	0	0	0	0
2025(loan)	→ Halifax Panthers	4	0	0	0	0
2025(loan)	→ Salford Red Devils	6	0	0	0	0
2025(loan)	→ Oldham	4	1	0	0	4
2026–	Hull Kingston Rovers	3	2	0	0	8
2026	→ Doncaster RLFC (loan)	8	3	0	0	12
	Total	51	10	0	0	40
- Source: As of 21 September 2026

Tom Whitehead is a professional rugby league footballer who plays as a second-row or loose forward for Doncaster RLFC in the RFL Championship, on loan from Hull Kingston Rovers in the Super League.

== Playing career ==
=== Warrington ===
In 2022 Whitehead made his début for the Wire in the Super League against the Salford Red Devils.

=== Rochdale Hornets (loan) ===
He has spent time on loan from Warrington at the Rochdale Hornets in League 1.

=== Widnes (DR) ===
On 3 January 2024 it was reported that he had signed for Widnes in the RFL Championship on DR-loan.

=== London Broncos (DR) ===
On 28 March 2025 it was reported that he had signed for London Broncos in the RFL Championship on DR loan

=== Halifax Panthers (loan) ===
On 16 April 2025 it was reported that he had signed for Halifax Panthers in the RFL Championship on loan

=== Salford Red Devils (loan) ===
On 17 June 2025 it was reported that he had signed for Salford Red Devils in the Super League on rolling-monthly loan

=== Oldham RLFC (loan) ===
On 14 August 2025 it was reported that he had signed for Oldham RLFC in the RFL Championship on loan for the remainder of the 2025 season

=== Hull Kingston Rovers ===
On 17 November 2025 it was reported that he had signed for Hull Kingston Rovers in the Super League on a 3-year deal.

=== Doncaster RLFC (loan) ===
On 4 June 2026 it was reported that he had signed for Doncaster RLFC in the RFL Championship on loan
