= Rhyse Martin =

Papua New Guinea international rugby league footballer (born 1993)

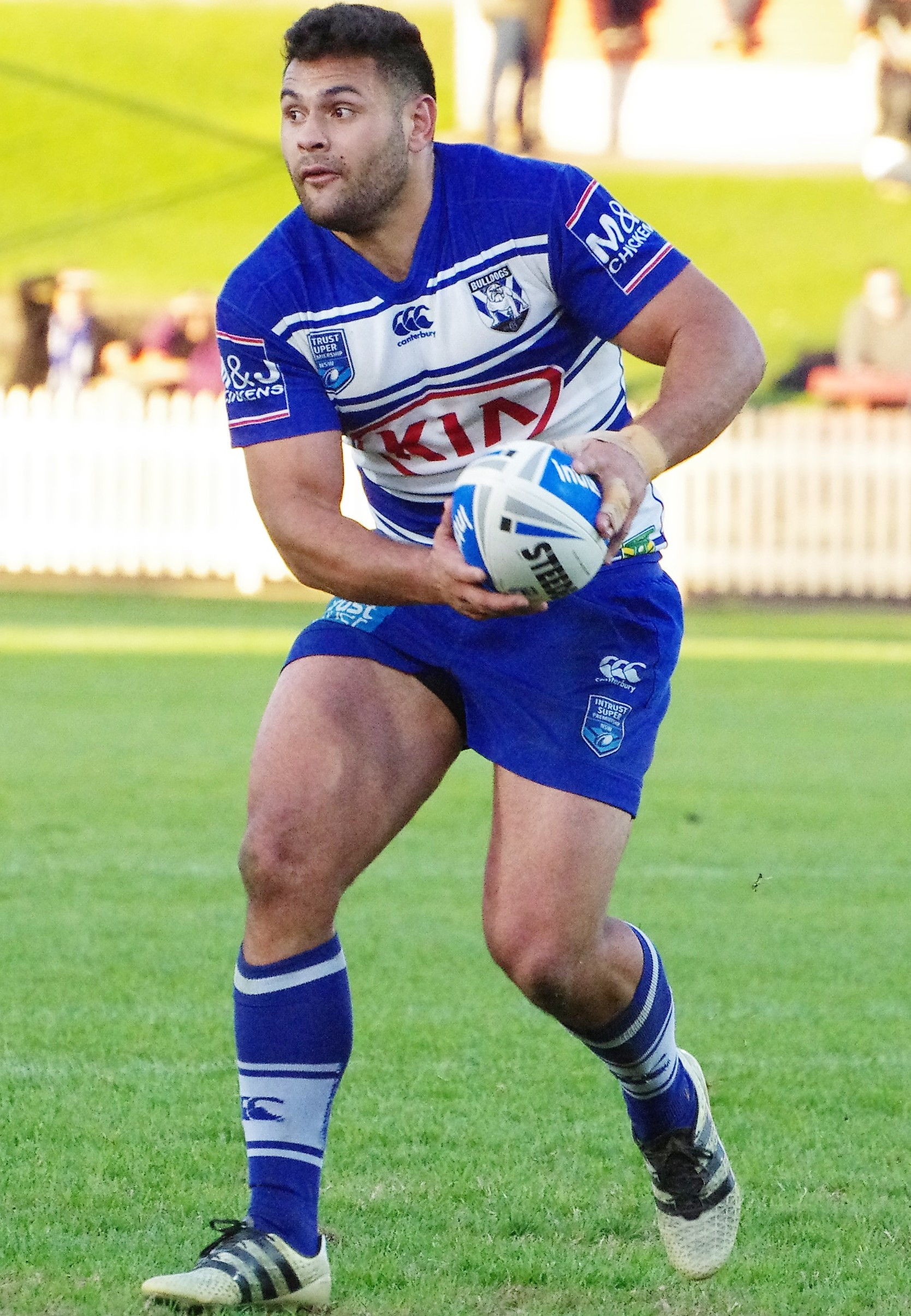

Personal information
- Full name: Rhyse Albert Martin
- Born: 1 March 1993 (age 33) Cairns, Queensland, Australia

Playing information
- Height: 6 ft 0 in (1.83 m)
- Weight: 15 st 10 lb (100 kg)
- Position: Second-row, Loose forward, Centre
Club
Years	Team	Pld	T	G	FG	P
2018–19	Canterbury Bulldogs	25	4	49	0	114
2019–24	Leeds Rhinos	132	40	440	0	1040
2025–26	Hull Kingston Rovers	43	12	149	0	278
	Total	200	56	638	0	1432
Representative
Years	Team	Pld	T	G	FG	P
2014–26	Papua New Guinea	24	8	82	0	196
2019	Papua New Guinea 9s	3	0	0	0	0
2022	Combined Nations All Stars	1	0	0	0	0
- Relatives: Tyson Martin (brother)

Rhyse Martin (born 1 March 1993) is a Papua New Guinea international rugby league footballer who last played as a second-row forward for Hull Kingston Rovers in the Betfred Super League.

He previously played for the Leeds Rhinos in the Super League and the Canterbury-Bankstown Bulldogs in the NRL, as well as captaining Papua New Guinea at international level.

== Background ==
Martin was born in Cairns, Queensland, Australia, and is of Papua New Guinean descent through his father, who is from Hula in the Central Province.

Martin was raised in the Whitsundays. As a teenager, Martin moved to Townsville, where he attended Kirwan State High School and played for Townsville Brothers.

He played his junior rugby league for the Proserpine Brahmans. After graduating in 2010, Martin moved to Sydney to join the Sydney Roosters.

== Club career ==
=== Early career ===
In 2011, Martin played for the Sydney Roosters SG Ball Cup side. Martin played for the Roosters NYC team in 2012 and 2013, captaining the side. On 20 April 2013, Martin was selected to represent the Queensland under-20 rugby league team against the New South Wales Under-20s rugby league team, playing off the interchange bench in the 36-12 loss at Penrith Stadium.

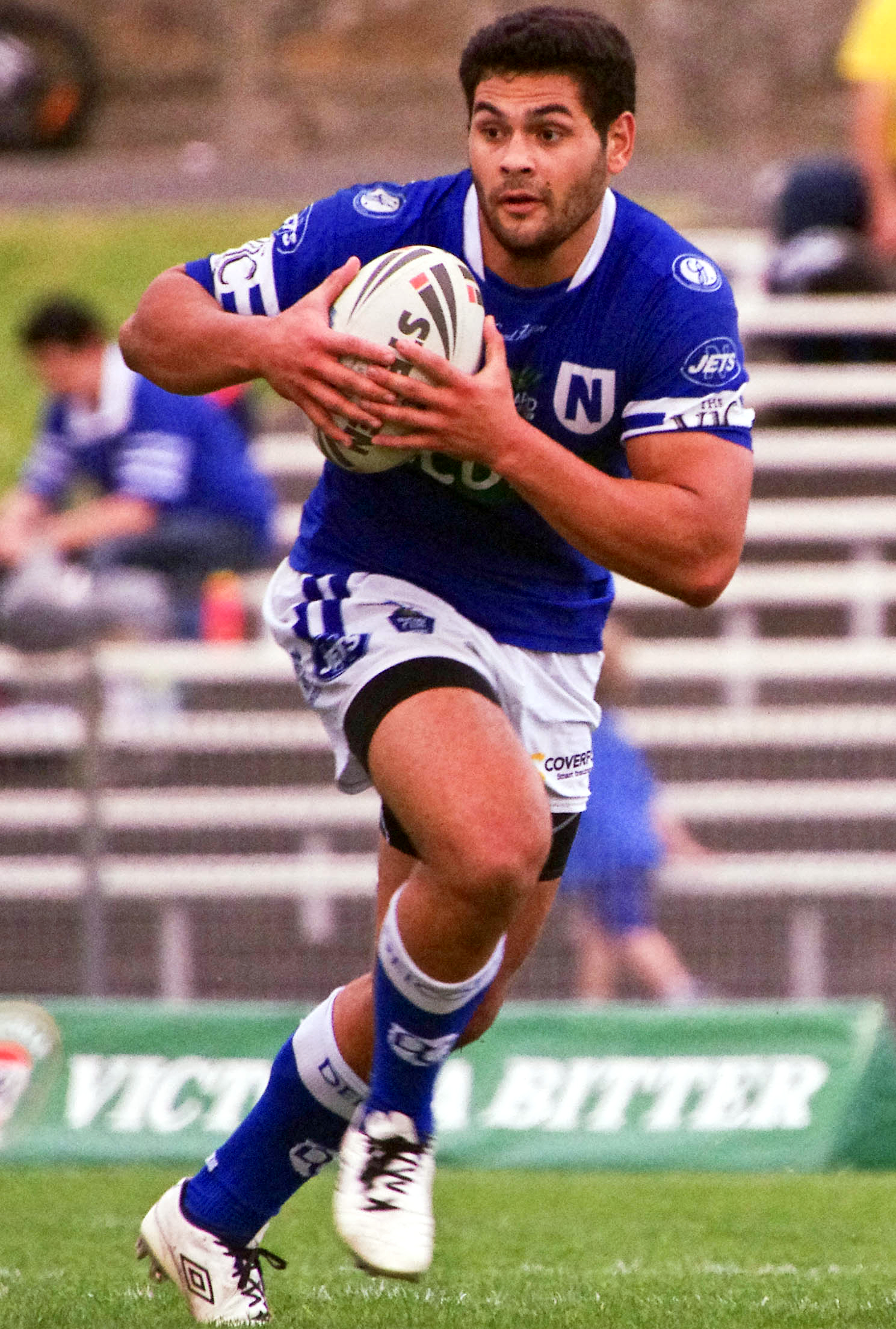
Martin playing for the Newtown Jets in 2014

In 2014, Martin joined the Roosters' NRL squad but did not make his first grade debut, spending the season playing for their feeder club, the Newtown Jets. The following November, Martin returned to North Queensland, joining the newly formed Intrust Super Cup team, the Townsville Blackhawks.

=== Canterbury-Bankstown Bulldogs ===
On 14 September 2016, Martin signed a two-year deal with the Canterbury-Bankstown Bulldogs. Martin spent 2017 playing for the Bulldogs NSW Cup team.

After showing good form for the Canterbury NSW Cup team, Martin finally had the chance to make his NRL debut at 25 years old. In round 9 of the 2018 NRL season, Martin made his NRL debut for the Canterbury-Bankstown Bulldogs against the Brisbane Broncos, starting at second-row and scoring a try with his first ever touch in Canterbury's last-second 22-20 loss at Suncorp Stadium.

After the mid-season departure of Moses Mbye to the Wests Tigers while Martin was cementing a starting spot at second-row, Martin took over the goal kicking duties. In Canterbury's round 17 loss against the Canberra Raiders on 7 July 2018 at Belmore Oval, Martin became the first NRL player to score 24 points in a losing side, scoring three tries in the second half and kicking six goals in a match that ended 32-28 after Canterbury had initially led 28-14 with six minutes to full-time.

On 23 July 2018, Martin re-signed with Canterbury-Bankstown for a year to the end of the 2018 season. Before the club's round 23 match against the New Zealand Warriors, Martin made a four-second cameo for Canterbury's NSW Cup team against the North Sydney Bears, all because Martin played in seven matches for Canterbury's NSW Cup team before being elevated to first-grade but needed eight ISP appearances so he can play in the NSW Cup Finals series.

Martin finished his debut year in the NRL with him playing in 14 matches, scoring four tries and produced the greatest goalkicking for the season, converting 36 goals from 38 attempts at an 94.7% and being the highest point-scorer with 88 for the club in the 2018 NRL season.

As the Canterbury first-grade squad didn't make the finals, Martin continued to play for the club's NSW Cup team, being the Captain and helping them make it into the NSW Cup Grand Final. On 23 September 2018, Martin played at second-row in the Canterbury-Bankstown NSW Cup Grand Final against Newtown, kicking 3 goals in the 18-12 victory at Leichhardt Oval. In the following week, on 30 September 2018, Martin played at second-row in the State Championship Final against Queensland Cup winners the Redcliffe Dolphins, scoring the first try of the match and kicking five goals in the 42-18 win. On 17 December 2018, Martin was named in the emerging Queensland squad.

After being one of Canterbury's shining lights from last season, Martin was not selected for the squad in the first two matches of the 2019 NRL season. It was understood that Martin has fallen foul of the coaching staff after he returned to pre-season training carrying a little too much condition and speculation of concerns with his defence. Martin would return in Round 3 against the Wests Tigers for the demoted Raymond Faitala-Mariner, starting at lock and kicking three goals in Canterbury's 22-8 win at Campbelltown Stadium.

=== Leeds Rhinos ===
Martin requested a release from his Canterbury contract in June 2019 after falling out of favour with coach Dean Pay, and on 30 June, signed a two-and-a-half year deal to join English Super League club Leeds Rhinos with immediate effect.

On 17 October 2020, Martin played in Leeds' 2020 Challenge Cup Final victory over Salford Red Devils at Wembley Stadium, scoring two out of three conversions and contributing to Leeds' first Challenge Cup victory since 2015. Martin made 25 appearances for Leeds in the 2021 Super League season, including in the semi-final defeat by St Helens, as the club made it to within one game of the 2021 Super League Grand Final.

In round 22 of the 2022 Super League season, Martin scored two tries and kicked seven goals in Leeds 34-14 victory over Salford Red Devils. On 24 September 2022, Martin played in the Leeds squad which lost 24-12 to St Helens in the 2022 Super League Grand Final at Old Trafford, scoring a second-half try and kicking two goals during the match.

Martin played a total of 27 games for Leeds in the 2023 Super League season as the club finished 8th on the table and missed the playoffs. Martin also finished with ten tries and as the clubs top point scorer with 200 points; in round 16 of the 2023 Super League season, he scored two tries and kicked nine goals as Leeds defeated the Huddersfield Giants 54-0. In his final season for Leeds in 2024, on 1 September, Martin scored a hat-trick and kicked four goals in Leeds' 21-20 golden point extra-time victory over the London Broncos.

=== Hull Kingston Rovers ===
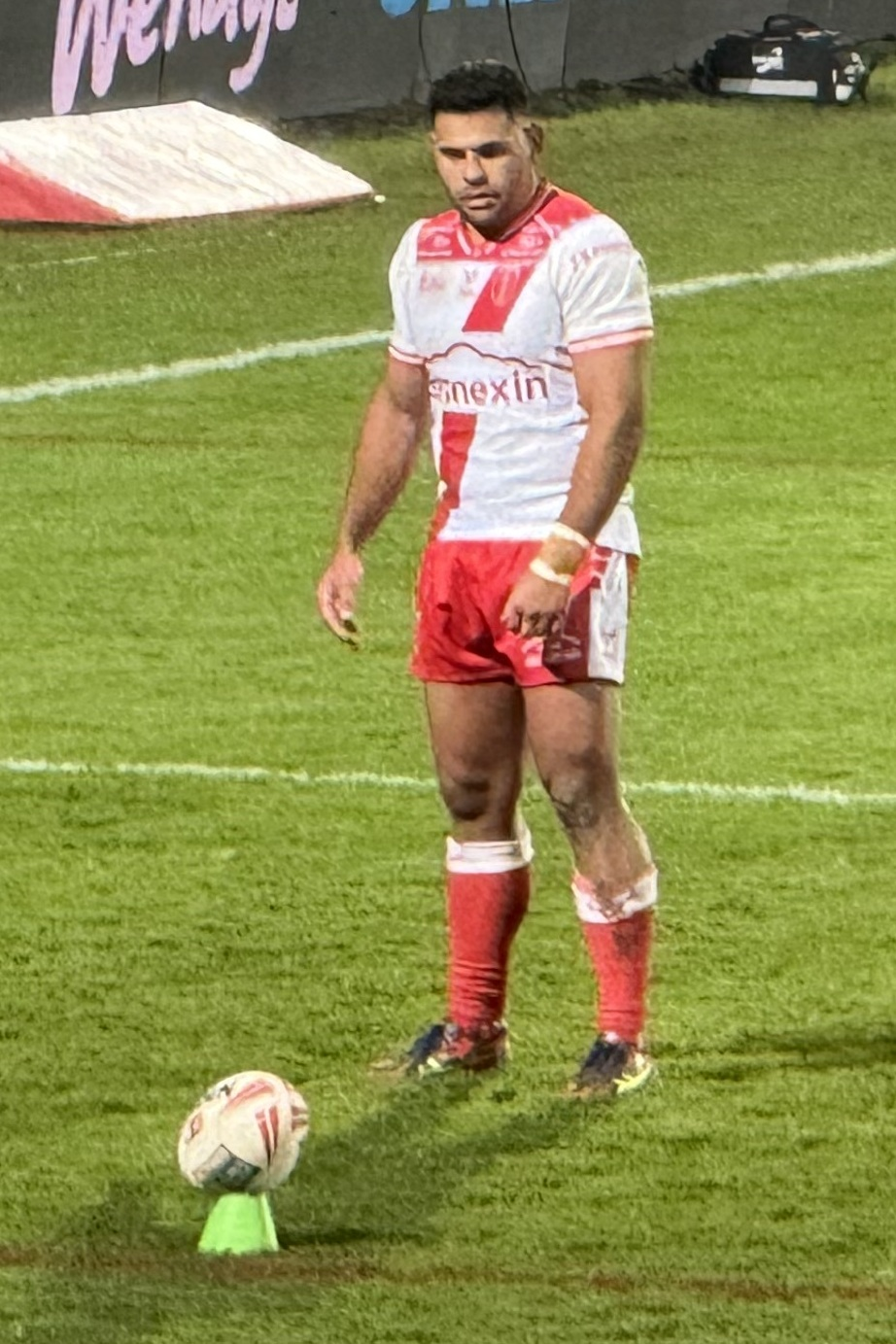
Martin preparing for a conversion kick for Hull Kingston Rovers in February 2025

Martin confirmed his departure from Leeds at the end of the 2024 on 29 July, and on 28 August, Martin signed a two-year deal to join Hull Kingston Rovers in the 2025 Super League season.

Martin was part of the squad that brought Hull Kingston Rovers its historic first treble in 2025; despite being unable for selection for the 2025 Challenge Cup final due to a quad injury sustained earlier in March, Martin played in Hull Kingston Rovers' final round victory on 18 September over Warrington Wolves, kicking four conversions in the fixture that ensured they lifted the League Leaders Shield, and on 9 October, Martin was part of the Hull Kingston Rovers squad that won the 2025 Super League Grand Final and secured their treble at Old Trafford over Wigan Warriors, scoring three conversions during the fixture. Also that season, on 31 July, Martin scored a total 22 points by scoring seven conversions and scoring two tries in a 74-12 win over Salford Red Devils, which saw him pass the 1,000 point mark in the Super League, becoming the first Papua New Guinean player to do so.

On 6 February, Martin broke Hull Kingston Rovers' record for the highest goal scorer in a single fixture, scoring 16 conversions in a 2026 Challenge Cup Round 3 fixture against Lock Lane ARLFC, beating a record of 14 goals jointly held by Colin Armstrong, Alf Carmichael, Damien Couturier and Mike Fletcher. The fixture, which ended 104-0, also broke Hull Kingston Rovers' record for a highest score in a single match. On 19 February 2026, Martin played in Hull Kingston Rovers World Club Challenge victory against Brisbane.

On 28 May 2026, Martin announced he'll be retiring following the end of the 2026 season. Hours later the PNG Chiefs announced that Martin would join the team in 2027 as Football Operations Manager.

== International career ==
On 19 October 2014, Martin made his international debut for Papua New Guinea against Tonga, playing at second-row and kicking two goals in the 32-18 win at Lae.

On 2 May 2015, Martin played for Papua New Guinea against Fiji in the Melanesian Cup, playing at second-row in the 22-10 loss at Robina Stadium. In May 2016, Martin was selected again for Papua New Guinea for the Melanesian Cup but withdrew for personal reasons. Martin again played for the Townsville Blackhawks in 2016 and was named at second-row in the 2016 Intrust Super Cup team of the year.

Martin played in all four matches for Papua New Guinea, scoring two tries and kicking 16 goals in their 2017 Rugby League World Cup campaign.

On 23 June 2018, Martin played for Papua New Guinea against Fiji in the Melanesian Cup, playing at second-row and kicking five goals in the 26-14 win at Campbelltown Stadium.

On 6 October 2018, Martin played for Papua New Guinea against Prime Minister's XIII, playing at second-row, scoring a try and kicking three goals in the 34-18 loss at Port Moresby.

Playing for Papua New Guinea in the second round of the group stage in the delayed 2021 Rugby League World Cup, Martin had the chance to set a new world record for most consecutive conversions in a row; Martin had previously kicked 41 successful goals since July 2022. However, Martin missed a conversion attempt to set the new world record during Papua New Guinea's 32-16 victory over the Cook Islands.

== Personal life ==
Martin has four older brothers and one younger brother. One of his older brothers, Tyson, played for the Mackay Cutters and was also a Papua New Guinean international.

== Statistics ==
Year	Team	Games	Tries	Goals	Pts
2018	Canterbury-Bankstown Bulldogs	14	4	36	88
2019	Canterbury-Bankstown Bulldogs	11		13	26
2019	Leeds Rhinos	9	2	34	76
2020	Leeds Rhinos	16	4	62	142
2021	Leeds Rhinos	25	3	88	192
2022	Leeds Rhinos	26	11	88	228
2023	Leeds Rhinos	28	10	80	200
2024	Leeds Rhinos	28	10	88	216
2025	Hull KR	15	6	33	116
2026	Hull KR	28	6	116	256
	Totals	200	56	638	1432
