= Leon Ruan =

English professional rugby league footballer

Personal information
- Full name: Leon Ruan
- Born: 14 May 2003 (age 23) Leeds, West Yorkshire, England
- Height: 6 ft 2 in (1.88 m)
- Weight: 16 st 3 lb (103 kg)

Playing information
- Position: Second-row
Club
Years	Team	Pld	T	G	FG	P
2022	Doncaster	21	6	0	0	24
2023–24	Leeds Rhinos	11	1	0	0	4
2023(loan)	→ Bradford Bulls	2	0	0	0	0
2024(loan)	→ Doncaster	1	0	0	0	0
2024(loan)	→ Halifax Panthers	2	0	0	0	0
2024(loan)	→ Hull FC	4	0	0	0	0
2026	Hull Kingston Rovers	0	0	0	0	0
2025(loan)	→ Featherstone Rovers	1	0	0	0	0
2025(loan)	→ Salford Red Devils	5	0	0	0	0
2026(loan)	→ Bradford Bulls	12	1	0	0	4
2027–	Bradford Bulls	0	0	0	0	0
	Total	59	8	0	0	32
- Source: As of 23 September 2026

Leon Ruan (born 14 May 2003) is an English professional rugby league footballer who plays as a second-row forward for the Bradford Bulls.

He previously played for Doncaster in RFL League One and the Leeds Rhinos in the Super League. Ruan spent time on loan from Leeds at Doncaster and the Halifax Panthers in the RFL Championship as well as Hull FC in the top flight. He spent time on loan from Hull KR at Featherstone Rovers in the Championship and the Salford Red Devils in the Super League.

== Background ==
Ruan was born in Leeds, West Yorkshire, England and grew up in Morley, West Yorkshire.

He played for Batley Boys as a junior.

Ruan was part of Wakefield Trinity's Academy system.

== Career ==
=== Doncaster RLFC ===
Ruan made his debut for Doncaster in February 2022 against Whitehaven in the League 1.

=== Leeds Rhinos ===
His 2022 season with the Dons earned him a move to the Leeds Rhinos in the Super League, signing a three-year deal from the following season.

=== Doncaster RLFC (loan) ===
In March 2024 Ruan was sent on loan from Leeds to Doncaster in Championship.

=== Halifax Panthers (loan) ===
He played two games on loan from Rhinos at the Halifax Panthers in the second tier in May and June 2024.

=== Hull FC (loan) ===
Ruan spent more time away from Headingley, spending the final few months of the 2024 Super League season on loan at Hull FC.

=== Hull KR ===
He joined Hull Kingston Rovers on a two-year deal ahead of the 2025 Super League season.

He was amongst 9 other players who left Hull KR at the end of the 2026 season

=== Featherstone Rovers (loan) ===
Ruan spent time on loan from Hull KR at Featherstone Rovers in the Championship.

=== Salford Red Devils (loan) ===
He spent time on loan from Craven Park at the Salford Red Devils in the Super League.

=== Bradford Bulls (loan) ===
Ruan joined the Bradford Bulls on a season-long loan from Hull Kingston Rovers for the 2026 Super League season.

=== Bradford Bulls ===
On 23 September 2026 it was confirmed that he had signed permanently for Bradford Bulls in the Super League
