= Louix Gorman =

Professional rugby league footballer (born 2005)

Personal information
- Born: 25 April 2005 (age 21) Kingston upon Hull, East Riding of Yorkshire, England
- Height: 5 ft 10 in (1.78 m)
- Weight: 13 st 5 lb (85 kg)

Playing information
- Position: Centre, Fullback
Club
Years	Team	Pld	T	G	FG	P
2023–	Hull Kingston Rovers	4	1	0	0	4
2024(loan)	→ Featherstone Rovers	7	0	11	0	22
2025(loan)	→ Featherstone Rovers	2	0	3	0	6
2025(loan)	→ London Broncos	8	5	1	0	22
2025(loan)	→ Salford Red Devils	4	0	0	0	0
2026	→ Salford RLFC (loan)	1	0	0	0	0
	Total	26	6	15	0	54
- Source: As of 11 September 2026

Louix Gorman (born 25 April 2005) is a professional rugby league footballer who plays as a centre or fullback for Hull Kingston Rovers in the Betfred Super League.

He has spent time on loan from Hull KR at Featherstone Rovers and the London Broncos in the RFL Championship, and the Salford Red Devils in the Super League.

== Background ==
Gorman was born in Kingston upon Hull, East Riding of Yorkshire, England. He is of Irish heritage.

He played for the Beverley Braves as a junior. Gorman was named in the England Academy squad in 2023.

== Career ==
=== Hull Kingston Rovers ===
Gorman joined the first team Hull KR squad ahead of the 2023 season, making his debut against the Wigan Warriors in August 2023.

He played for Featherstone Rovers in two separate loans spells.

He spent time in 2025 on loan at the London Broncos in the Betfred Championship.

In August 2025 Gorman was loaned out by Rovers to the Salford Red Devils, during which time he played four Super League matches for Salford.

=== Salford RLFC (loan) ===
On 6 August 2026 it was reported that he had signed for Salford RLFC in the RFL Championship on loan
