= Peta Hiku =

New Zealand international rugby league footballer

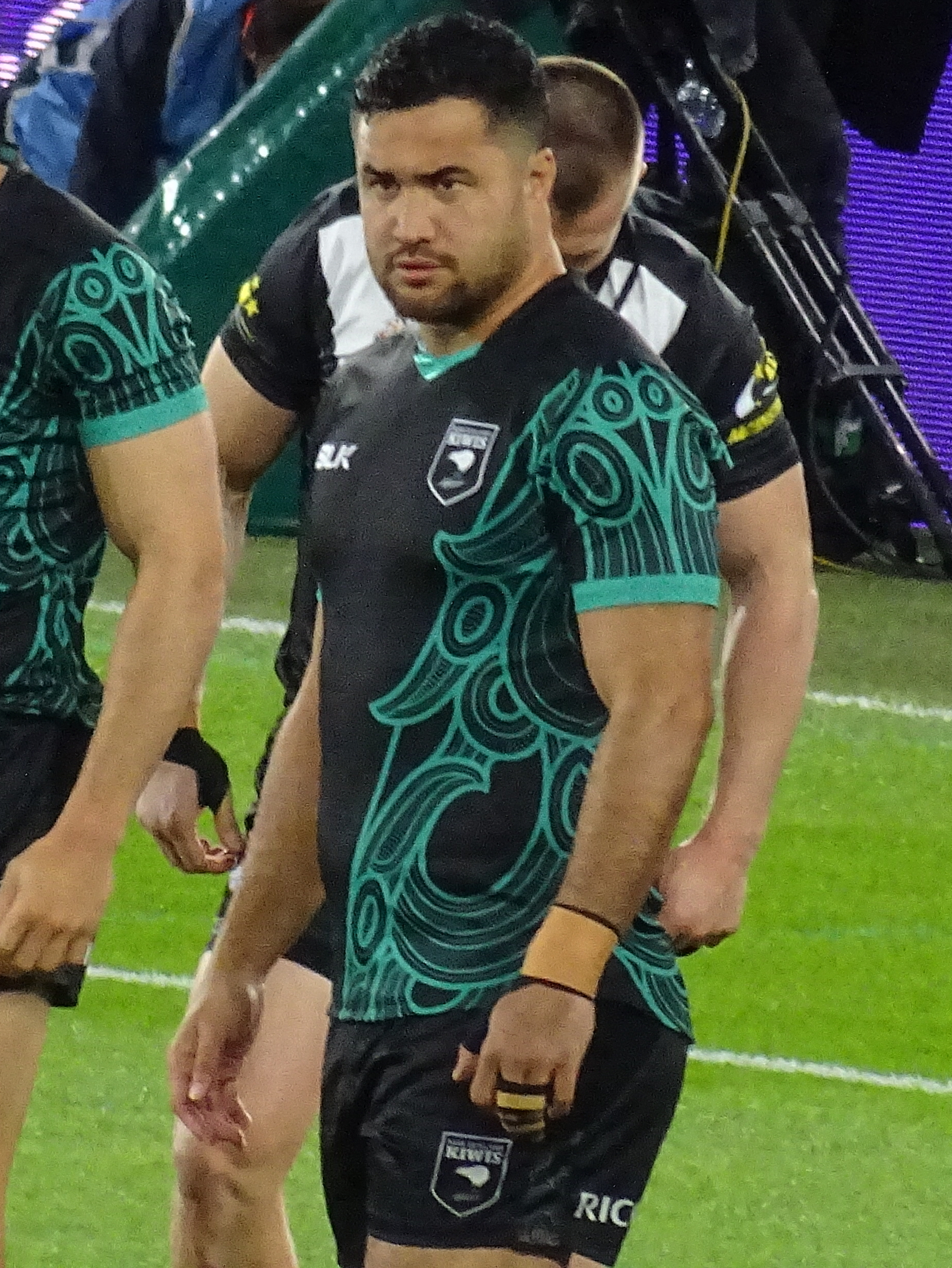

Personal information
- Born: 4 December 1992 (age 33) Gisborne, New Zealand
- Height: 5 ft 11 in (1.81 m)
- Weight: 14 st 11 lb (94 kg)

Playing information
- Position: Centre, Wing, Fullback
Club
Years	Team	Pld	T	G	FG	P
2013–15	Manly Sea Eagles	60	28	3	0	118
2016–17	Penrith Panthers	20	6	0	0	24
2017	Warrington Wolves	11	10	0	0	40
2018–21	New Zealand Warriors	73	19	0	0	76
2022–23	North Qld Cowboys	48	7	0	0	28
2024–	Hull Kingston Rovers	95	33	1	0	134
	Total	307	103	4	0	420
Representative
Years	Team	Pld	T	G	FG	P
2014–	New Zealand	20	7	0	0	28
2019	Māori All Stars	1	0	0	0	0
- Source: As of 19 September 2026

Peta Hiku (born 4 December 1992) is a New Zealand rugby league footballer who plays as a centre, winger and fullback for Hull Kingston Rovers in the Super League, and New Zealand and the New Zealand Māori at international level.

He previously played for the Manly-Warringah Sea Eagles, Penrith Panthers, New Zealand Warriors and North Queensland Cowboys in the NRL and the Warrington Wolves in the Super League.

== Background ==
Hiku was born in Gisborne, New Zealand, and is of Māori descent.

Hiku played his junior football for the Manurewa Marlins and represented the Counties Manukau Stingrays in the National Competition. Hiku played for the New Zealand Warriors' under-20s team in 2012, and had the second most metres gained during the 2012 NYC season behind teammate Ligi Sao. At the end of 2012, Hiku was named the New Zealand Warriors under-20s player of the year. On 13 October 2012, Hiku played for the Junior Kiwis against the Junior Kangaroos, playing off the interchange bench in the 48–16 loss.

== Playing career ==
=== 2013 ===
In 2013, Hiku (and long time Marlins and Warriors teammate Ligi Sao) left the New Zealand Warriors and joined Sydney NRL club Manly Warringah Sea Eagles, playing mostly at fullback for the Luke Williamson-coached ManlyNew South Wales Cup team. In Round 6 of the 2013 NRL season, Hiku made his NRL debut on the wing for Manly-Warringah in place of the injured David Williams against the Cronulla-Sutherland Sharks at Brookvale Oval, scoring a try on debut in Manly's 25–18 win. In his first game of NRL finals football in the 2013 NRL season, in place of an injured Brett Stewart, Hiku was judged as man of the match despite Manly going down 4–0 to the 2013 minor premiers the Sydney Roosters at the Sydney Football Stadium. Hiku ran for a club record 297 metres on the night. Hiku later backed that up by running 231 in the following week's 24-18 semi-final win over Cronulla-Sutherland Sharks at the SFS.

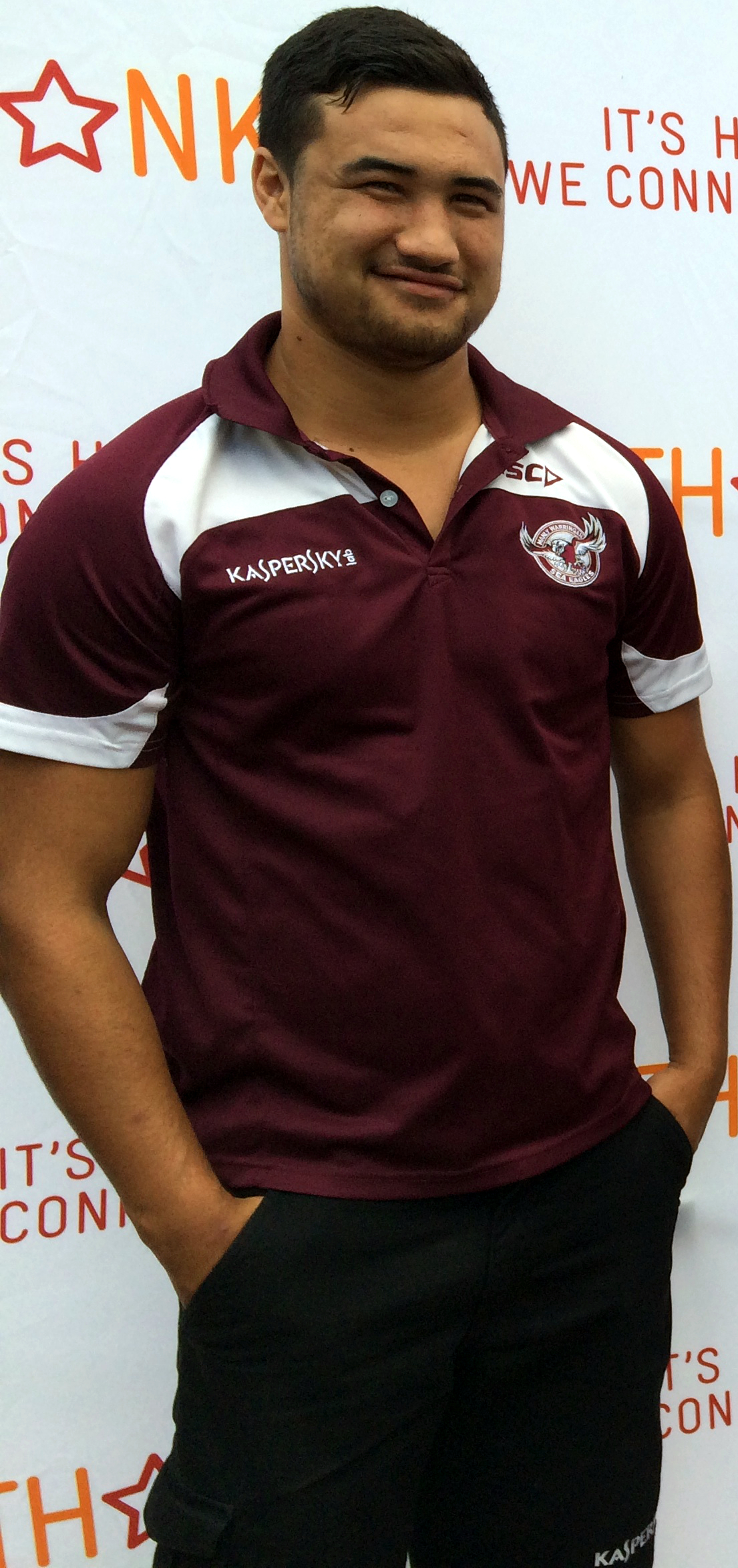
Hiku representing Manly in 2013

Stewart made a surprise return from injury in the preliminary final win over South Sydney and Hiku was considered unlucky to miss a place on the bench both against Souths and in Manly's grand final team which lost 26–18 to the Roosters. Hiku finished his debut year in the NRL as a "Mr Fix It" type player, mostly filling in for the injured Brett Stewart, playing in 13 matches and scoring 3 tries for the Manly-Warringah Sea Eagles in the 2013 NRL season.

=== 2014 ===
As of Round 7 of the 2014 NRL season, Hiku had played in all seven games for Manly-Warringah following injuries to other players, though when Brett Stewart and winger Jorge Taufua returned to the side coach Geoff Toovey retained Hiku in place of the out of form David Williams. On 2 May 2014, Hiku played his first test for New Zealand when he played at fullback in their 30–18 loss to Australia in the 2014 Anzac Test at the Sydney Football Stadium. On 13 May 2014, Hiku re-signed with Manly to the end of the 2017 season after the Canterbury-Bankstown Bulldogs offered him a contract who were searching for a fullback to replace the departed Ben Barba. Hiku, who expressed his desire to stay with Manly-Warringah, also reportedly turned down a one million dollar contract to return to the New Zealand Warriors despite the opportunity to be closer to his family. Hiku cemented his place on the wing for Manly, even keeping 2013 NRL top tryscorer David Williams in NSW Cup before "The Wolfman" was suspended for the season by the NRL due to a betting scandal. Hiku finished off the season with him playing in all of the Manly club's 26 matches and being the club's highest tryscorer with 17 tries. On 23 September 2014, Hiku was selected in New Zealand's Four Nations train-on squad. On 7 October 2014, Hiku was selected in New Zealand's final 24 man squad for the Four Nations. Hiku played superbly at fullback in the Kiwi 30–12 victory over Australia on 25 October 2014 in the first game of the Four Nations tournament, helping the Kiwis to a 30–12 win over Australia, as well as their first win over Australia since the 2010 Four Nations final. Hiku went on to feature in every tournament game for the Kiwis, playing every minute of every game at fullback. Hiku played in the Kiwis 22-18 Four Nations final win over Australia at Westpac Stadium.

=== 2015 ===
On 31 January and 1 February, Hiku played for Manly-Warringah in the 2015 NRL Auckland Nines. He retained his spot in the New Zealand team for the 2015 Anzac Test, though he was moved to the centres as the Kiwis continued their Four Nations form with a 26–12 win over Australia at Suncorp Stadium. Hiku finished the 2015 season having played in 22 matches, scoring 8 tries and kicking 3 goals for Manly-Warringah. On 8 September, he was named in the New Zealand Kiwis training squad for their tour of Great Britain. He was a shock selection at five-eighth, playing in all three matches against England in the Kiwis' 2-1 Baskerville Shield series loss. In November, he was told by Manly's new incoming coach Trent Barrett that he was free to look for another club. He was linked with the Penrith Panthers, Parramatta Eels, South Sydney Rabbitohs and St. George Illawarra Dragons, eventually signing a three-year contract with Penrith on 9 December, starting in 2016, after being released from the final two years of his Manly contract.

=== 2016 ===
In Round 1 of the 2016 NRL season, Hiku made his club debut for Penrith against the Canberra Raiders, playing at centre and scoring a try in Penrith's 30–22 loss at Canberra Stadium. In Round 11 against the Gold Coast Titans, Hiku suffered a season ending knee injury in Penrith's 28–24 loss at Penrith Stadium. Hiku finished his 2016 NRL season early with him playing in 11 matches and scoring 5 tries in his first year with the Penrith club.

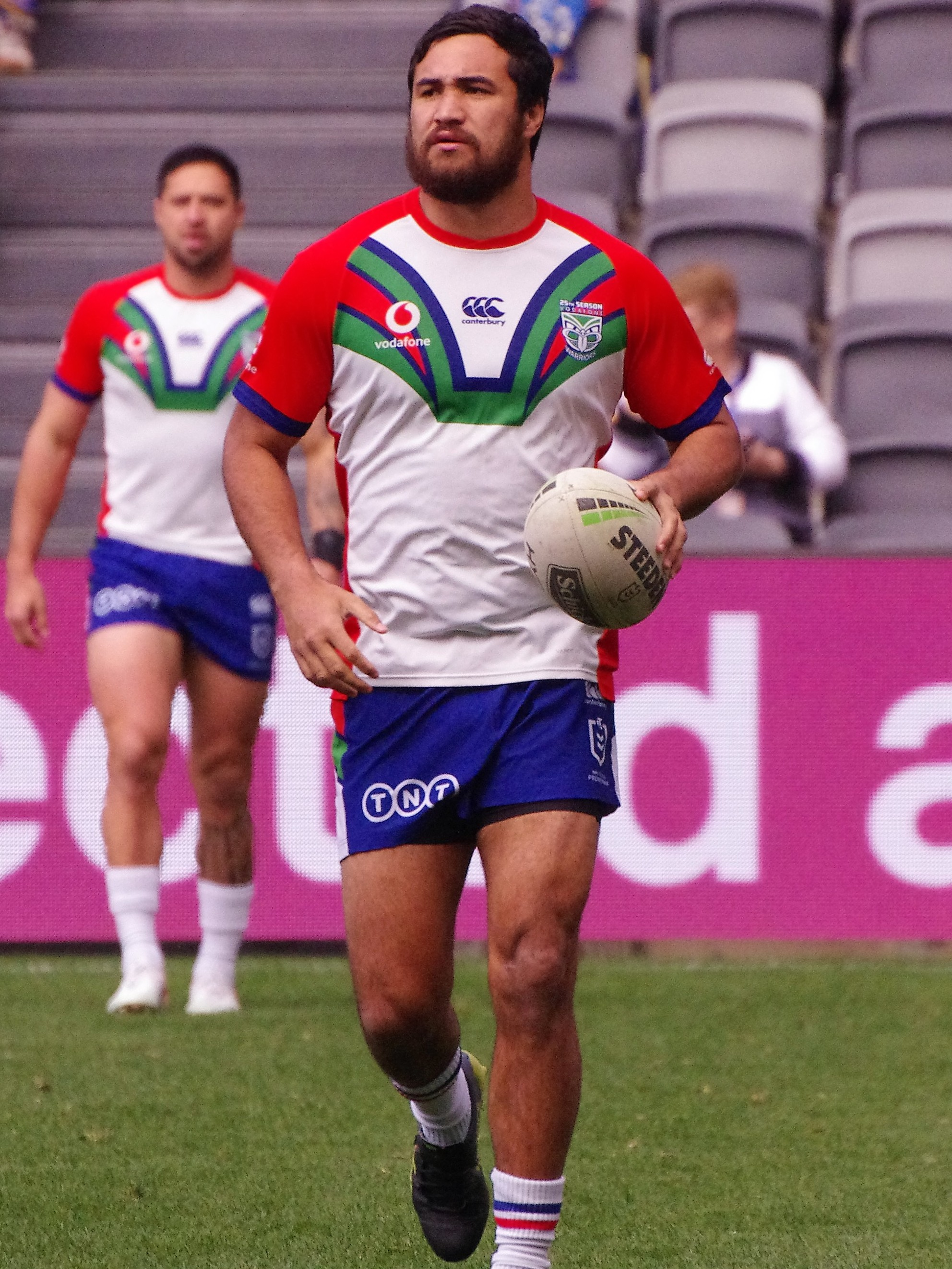
Hiku warming up for the Warriors in 2019

=== 2017 ===
In Round 1 against the St. George Illawarra Dragons, Hiku made his return for Penrith where he suffered a fractured eye socket from a late hit from St. George prop Russell Packer in the 42-10 shock loss at Jubilee Oval. Hiku was set to miss a month of footy but returned early in Round 3 against the Sydney Roosters where he came off the interchange bench in the 14–12 loss at Penrith Stadium. On 19 June 2017, Hiku was released from his contract mid-season from the Penrith club to join the Warrington Wolves in the Super League after he was going behind in the pecking order for the centre and wing positions. Hiku finished his 2017 NRL season with the Panthers with him playing in 9 matches and scoring 1 try. Hiku scored his first try in a 22–6 victory over local rivals the Widnes Vikings, and then scored again against them the following week in a 28–14 win in Round 1 of the Super 8 Qualifiers. Hiku would go on to play in 11 matches and score 10 tries in his short stint for Warrington. On 9 October 2017, Hiku was granted a released from Warrington on compassionate grounds to sign with the New Zealand Warriors on a three-year deal, starting from 2018. On 5 October 2017, Hiku was named in the 24-man New Zealand Kiwis squad for the 2017 Rugby League World Cup. Hiku only played in 1 match in the tournament which was against Scotland, where he scored a hattrick of tries in the 74-6 demolishing win at Lancaster Park in Christchurch.

=== 2018 ===
In Round 1 of the 2018 NRL season, Hiku made his club debut for the New Zealand Warriors against the South Sydney Rabbitohs, playing at centre in the 32–20 win at Perth Stadium.

=== 2019 ===
Hiku made 23 appearances for New Zealand in the 2019 NRL season. The club missed the finals finishing 13th.

=== 2020 ===
Hiku made 18 appearances for New Zealand in the 2020 NRL season as the club missed out on the finals.

=== 2021 ===
On 11 May, Hiku was ruled out for the remainder of the 2021 NRL season with a shoulder injury. On 24 May, it was announced Hiku signed a two-year deal with North Queensland starting in 2022.

=== 2022 ===
Hiku played 26 games for North Queensland in the 2022 NRL season as the club finished third on the table and qualified for the finals. Hiku played in both finals matches for North Queensland including their upset loss to Parramatta in the preliminary final which denied the club a fairy tale grand final appearance.

=== 2023 ===
In round 2 of the 2023 NRL season, Hiku was placed on report for a crusher tackle during North Queensland's loss to arch-rivals Brisbane. Hiku was later suspended for two games over the incident. On 21 May, Hiku signed a three-year contract to join English side Hull Kingston Rovers.

=== 2024 ===
Hiku made his club debut for Hull Kingston Rovers against arch-rivals Hull F.C. in round 1 of the 2024 Super League season. Hull Kingston Rovers would win the match 22–0. On 12 October 2024, Hiku played in Hull Kingston Rovers 2024 Super League Grand Final loss against Wigan.

=== 2025 ===
On 7 June, Hiku played in Hull Kingston Rovers 8-6 2025 Challenge Cup final victory over Warrington. It was the clubs first major trophy in 40 years. On 18 September, Hiku played in Hull Kingston Rovers victory over Warrington to claim the League Leaders Shield in the final league game of the season. On 9 October, Hiku played in Hull Kingston Rovers 2025 Super League Grand Final victory over Wigan.

=== 2026 ===
On 19 February, Hiku played in Hull Kingston Rovers World Club Challenge victory against Brisbane.

== Statistics ==
Year	Team	Games	Tries	Goals	Pts
2013	Manly Warringah Sea Eagles	12	3		12
2014	Manly Warringah Sea Eagles	26	17		68
2015	Manly Warringah Sea Eagles	22	8	3	38
2016	Penrith Panthers	11	5		20
2017	Penrith Panthers	9	1		4
2017	Warrington	11	10		40
2018	New Zealand Warriors	22	4		16
2019	New Zealand Warriors	23	6		24
2020	New Zealand Warriors	18	8		32
2021	New Zealand Warriors	10	1		4
2022	North Queensland Cowboys	26	5		20
2023	North Queensland Cowboys	22	2		8
2024	Hull KR	32	16	1	66
2025	Hull KR	14	5	0	20
	Totals	258	92	4	352
