= James Batchelor (rugby league) =

English professional rugby league footballer

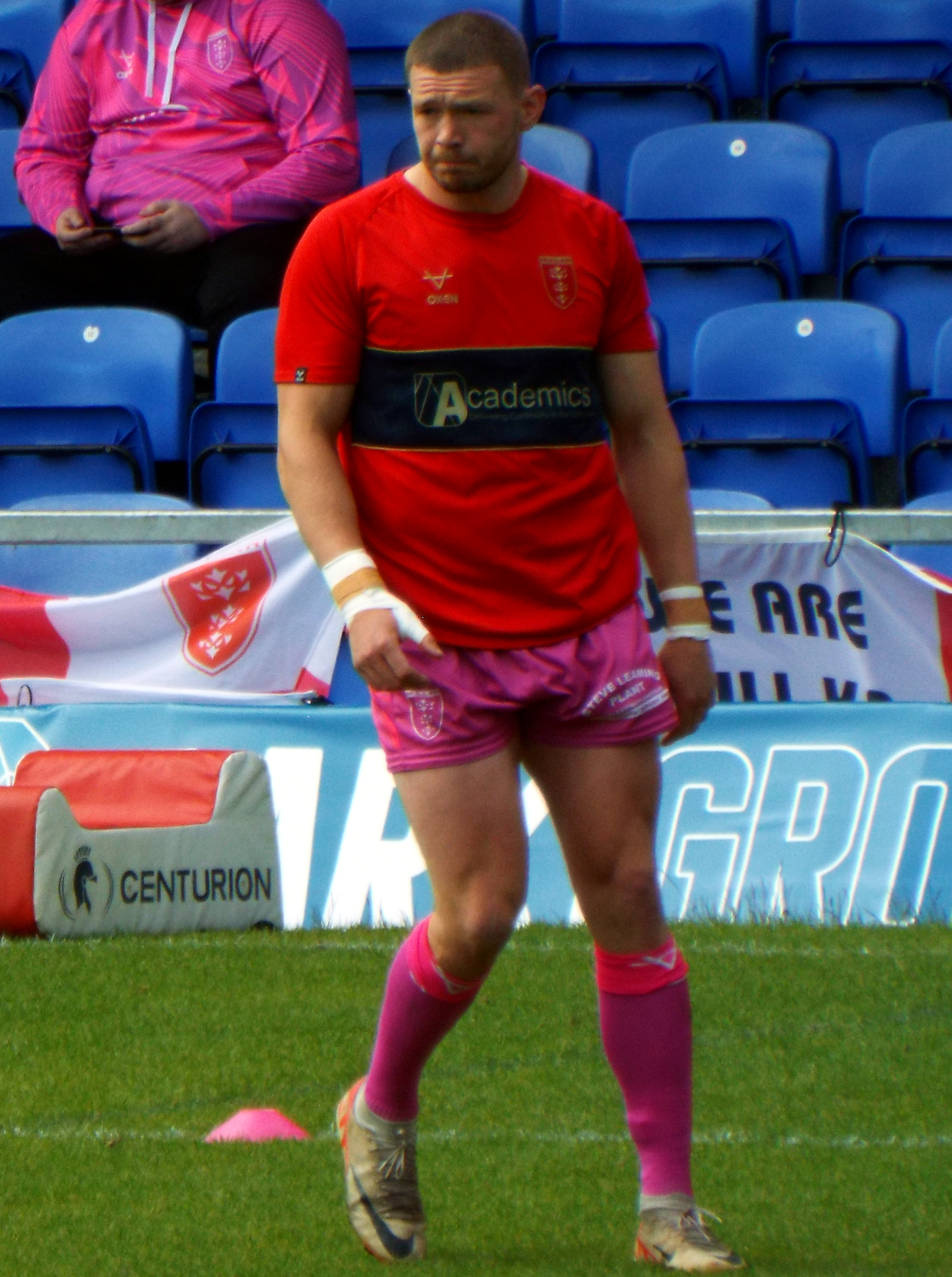

Personal information
- Full name: James Batchelor
- Born: 9 April 1998 (age 28) Wakefield, West Yorkshire, England
- Height: 5 ft 11 in (1.81 m)
- Weight: 15 st 6 lb (98 kg)

Playing information
- Position: Second-row, Loose forward
Club
Years	Team	Pld	T	G	FG	P
2016–22	Wakefield Trinity	96	24	13	0	122
2017(loan)	→ Dewsbury Rams	1	0	0	0	0
2023–	Hull Kingston Rovers	109	23	1	0	90
	Total	206	47	14	0	212
Representative
Years	Team	Pld	T	G	FG	P
2018–	England Knights	1	0	0	0	0
- Source: As of 19 September 2026
- Relatives: Joe Batchelor (brother)

James Batchelor (born 9 April 1998) is a professional rugby league footballer who plays as a second-row forward for Hull Kingston Rovers in the Super League and the England Knights at international level.

He has spent time on loan from Wakefield at the Dewsbury Rams in the Championship.

== Background ==
Batchelor's youth team was Crigglestone All Blacks; he was picked up by Wakefield Trinity via the Wakefield College team.

He is the brother of Joe Batchelor who plays for Hull FC in the Super League.

== Career ==
Batchelor played eight games in 2017 before picking up a hip injury that ended his season. After six years at Wakefield Trinity, Batchelor announced that he had signed a two-year deal to join Hull Kingston Rovers ahead of the 2023 season. On 12 August 2023, Batchelor played for Hull Kingston Rovers in their 17-16 golden point extra-time loss to Leigh in the Challenge Cup final. Batchelor played a total of 22 games for Hull Kingston Rovers in the 2023 Super League season as the club finished fourth on the table and qualified for the playoffs. He played in the clubs semi-final loss against Wigan. On 12 October 2024, Batchelor played in Hull Kingston Rovers 2024 Super League Grand Final loss against Wigan. On 7 June 2025, he played in Hull Kingston Rovers 8-6 2025 Challenge Cup final victory over Warrington. It was the clubs first major trophy in 40 years. On 18 September 2025, Batchelor played in Hull Kingston Rovers final game of the season in victory over Warrington which saw the club Lift the League Leaders Shield. On 11 October, Batchelor played in Hull Kingston Rovers Grand Final victory over Wigan completing the treble On 19 February 2026, Batchelor played in Hull Kingston Rovers World Club Challenge victory against Brisbane.

== International career ==
In July 2018 he was selected in the England Knights Performance squad. Later that year he was selected for the England Knights on their tour of Papua New Guinea. He played against Papua New Guinea at the Lae Football Stadium.
