= Lee Kershaw =

English rugby league player (born 1999)

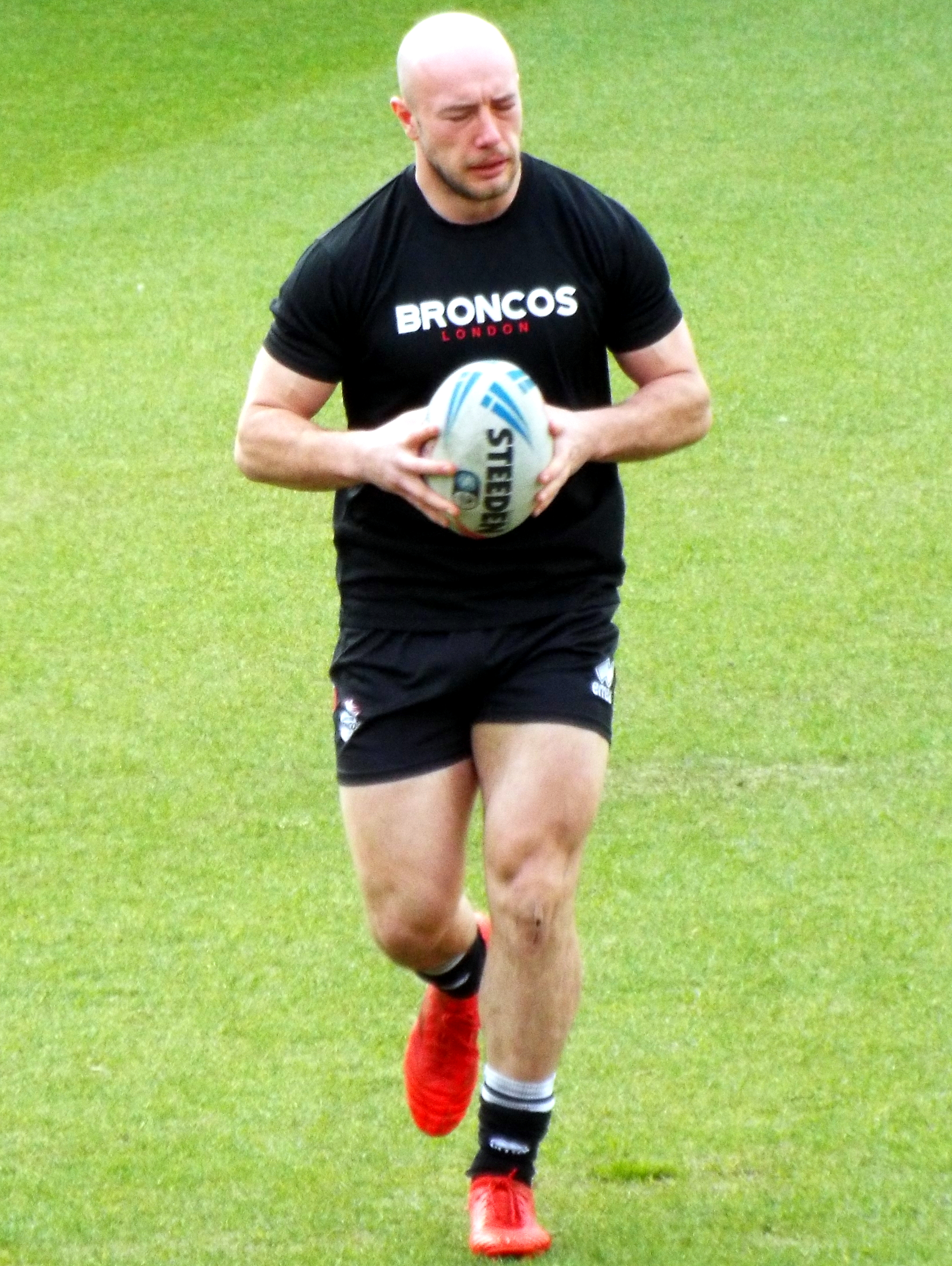

Personal information
- Full name: Lee Kershaw
- Born: 2 May 1999 (age 27) Bradford, West Yorkshire, England

Playing information
- Position: Wing
Club
Years	Team	Pld	T	G	FG	P
2018–23	Wakefield Trinity	50	18	0	0	72
2018(loan)	→ Oldham	20	11	0	0	44
2019(loan)	→ Oldham	7	5	0	0	20
2020(loan)	→ Oldham	1	0	0	0	0
2024	London Broncos	26	7	0	0	28
2025–26	Hull Kingston Rovers	3	1	0	0	4
2025(loan)	→ Castleford Tigers	3	0	0	0	0
2026(loan)	→ Huddersfield Giants	3	0	0	0	0
2027–	Doncaster RLFC	0	0	0	0	0
	Total	113	42	0	0	168
- Source: As of 15 November 2026

Lee Kershaw (born 2 May 1999) is an English professional rugby league footballer who plays as a winger for Doncaster RLFC in the RFL Championship.

He has previously played for Wakefield Trinity and London Broncos in the Super League. He has spent time on loan at Oldham in League 1 and the Championship, and at Castleford Tigers in the Super League.

== Background ==
Kershaw was born in Bradford, West Yorkshire, England.

He played rugby union as a junior for Bingley and West Yorkshire, before moving into playing league for the Eastmoor Dragons and Keighley Albion.

== Career ==
=== Wakefield Trinity ===
In 2019, Kershaw made his Super League début for Trinity against the Leeds Rhinos.

Kershaw played 17 matches for Wakefield Trinity in the Super League XXVIII season as the club finished bottom of the table and were relegated to the RFL Championship which ended their 24-year stay in the top flight.

=== London Broncos ===
In early February, it was reported that Kershaw was training with Leeds however he was not part of their squad. On 9 February 2024, he completed his move to the newly-promoted London Broncos. In round 1 of the 2024 Super League season, Kershaw made his club debut for London in their 40-4 loss against St Helens. In round 4, Kershaw scored two tries in London's 60-22 loss against Wigan.

=== Hull Kingston Rovers ===
In November 2024, Hull Kingston Rovers confirmed that Kershaw would remain in Super League for 2025 after signing with the East Yorkshire club.

He was amongst 10 other players who left Hull KR at the end of the 2026 season

==== Castleford Tigers (loan) ====
On 19 February 2025, it was announced that Kershaw would join Castleford Tigers on an initial two-week loan. After making two appearances, he returned to Hull KR following a spate of injuries.

In April, he was resigned by Castleford for a second two-week loan spell, with Innes Senior suspended for their upcoming fixture against Leigh Leopards. After his third Tigers appearance, head coach Danny McGuire admitted it was unlikely Kershaw would remain on a longer deal as Castleford's contracted wingers returning from injury would be preferred.

==== Huddersfield Giants (loan) ====
On 11 May 2026 it was reported that he had signed for Huddersfield Giants in the Super League on one-week loan

=== Doncaster RLFC ===
On 15 November 2026 it was reported that he had signed for Doncaster RLFC in the RFL Championship on a 2-year deal.
