= Noah Booth =

English professional rugby league footballer

Personal information
- Full name: Noah Booth
- Born: 21 October 2004 (age 22) Castleford, Yorkshire, England
- Height: 6 ft 1 in (1.85 m)
- Weight: 14 st 2 lb (90 kg)

Playing information
- Position: Wing, Centre, Fullback
Club
Years	Team	Pld	T	G	FG	P
2024–25	Wakefield Trinity	9	3	0	0	12
2024(loan)	→ Hunslet	1	1	0	0	4
2025(loan)	→ Hunslet	8	6	0	0	24
2025–	Hull Kingston Rovers	14	10	0	0	40
	Total	32	20	0	0	80
- Source: As of 11 September 2026

Noah Booth (born 21 October 2004) is an English professional rugby league footballer who plays as a winger for Hull Kingston Rovers in the Betfred Super League.

He has played for Wakefield Trinity in the Super League, and spent time on loan from Wakefield at Hunslet in League One and the RFL Championship.

== Background ==
Booth was born in Castleford, Yorkshire, England. His father Craig Booth is a former professional rugby league footballer.

He played for Lock Lane ARLFC as a junior.

Booth was in the Yorkshire Origin squad at youth level.

He came through the Castleford Tigers system, before joining the Warrington Wolves Academy in 2021.

== Career ==
Booth joined Wakefield Trinity ahead of the 2024 Super League season. He made his Trinity debut in the 1895 against the Newcastle Thunder in February 2024.

He spent time in 2024 on loan at Hunslet in League One.

Booth was to spend the entire season in 2025 on loan at Hunslet in the Betfred Championship.

Wakefield and Hull KR engaged in a swap-deal, with Booth and fellow winger Neil Tchamambe moving in the opposite directions. Booth was on a season-long loan to Championship side Hunslet and the arrangement remained in place, but was able to train with Rovers during the week, allowing the coaching to start working on his development immediately.
