= Penalty (rugby) =

Disciplinary sanction in rugby football

In rugby football, the penalty is the main disciplinary sanction available to the referee to penalise players who commit deliberate infringements. The team who did not commit the infringement are given possession of the ball and may either kick it towards touch (in which case the ball back rule is waived), attempt a place kick at goal, or tap the ball with their foot and run it. It is also sometimes used as shorthand for penalty goal.

== Penalties in rugby union ==
A penalty goal attempt

The referee signals that he has awarded a penalty to a side by raising his arm at 45 degrees between vertical and horizontal and blowing a blast on his whistle. The arm is raised on the side that won the penalty. Penalties may be awarded for a number of offences, including:

- Failing to release the ball after being tackled, or the tackling player failing to release the tackled player or doing a dangerous tackle on the other player.
- Entering a ruck or maul from the side.
- Leaving one's feet in the ruck.
- Deliberately collapsing a scrum or illegally collapsing a maul (see ELV).
- Scrum infringements: not binding properly on an opponent (for prop forwards) or a teammate (for other players); leaving the scrum before the ball has emerged from it; not pushing straight against the opposing pack.
- Being offside and not making an effort to move to an onside position.
- Tackling infringements: a high tackle (where contact is made above the shoulders); or a player holding a teammate off the ground.
- Violent or foul play: eye gouge, low blow, elbowing, tripping and so forth.
- Throwing or knocking the ball forwards, or out of play in any direction.
- Tackling or holding an opponent who is not in possession of the ball.
- Obstructing an opponent from tackling the ball-carrier (blocking).
- Not retreating ten metres at a penalty.
- Contesting or dissenting from a referee's decision, or using abusive language or conduct towards any match official.
- Any other action the referee considers to be "contrary to good sportsmanship" (such as throwing the ball away while play is stopped in order to prevent a prompt restart, especially if time is close to expiring).

Referees may not penalise some of these infringements if in their judgement the offending player had no intent to break the rules (e.g. a marginally late tackle on a player who has just kicked or passed the ball) or if the offending player was not participating in or affecting the game (e.g. a player who is in an offside position but not interfering with play). Equally, a referee may warn teams about technical infringements (especially at the scrum and ruck) before penalising them. Many consider a referee's willingness and ability to do so as a mark of good officiating in that it reduces stoppages in the game and allows it to "flow".

The side that is awarded the penalty restarts the game with a kick or scrum at their discretion. If a kick is taken, the side that the penalty was awarded against must retreat 10 metres (or to their goal line if closer). There are four ways of restarting the game;

- A tap penalty, often taken quickly to exploit lack of organisation in the opposition's retreating defence, is where a player drops the ball onto his foot and kicks it up into his arms (or puts it on the ground and kicks it a small distance before picking it up again) and then carries the ball forward.
- A kick to touch. The side with the penalty gets the throw-in to the resultant line-out, from which they have a good chance of securing possession. This is used mainly to gain territory though it is also used as a tactic to gain a platform for a rolling maul near the opponent's try line and muscle over for a score. The kicker may punt or drop kick for touch.
- A kick at goal. The kick at goal is usually taken off the ground from a sand or plastic tee (though it is possible to drop kick the ball). If it is successful, they score three points, and the opposition restart from the centre line. (In rugby sevens, the scoring team restarts from the centre line.) If the penalty is missed but the ball remains in play, play continues. If the penalty is missed and the ball goes dead a 22 metre drop-out is awarded to the opposition.
- A scrum. A team may opt to have a scrum. This would normally be taken if an attacking team wished to have all the defensive forwards tied up in one place allowing the backs the luxury of a one on one confrontation. Alternatively, if a team has ascendancy in the scrums they may try for a pushover try, which may result in the award of a penalty try if the scrums are deliberately collapsed by the defending side.
- A team awarded a penalty at a lineout may choose a further lineout into which they throw in.

One of the laws associated with penalties was experimented with in association football, that being that penalties may be moved 10 metres forward of their original position either due to talk-back from the players or offside from a quick tap penalty. This was dropped after variable application by referees, but remains a rugby rule.

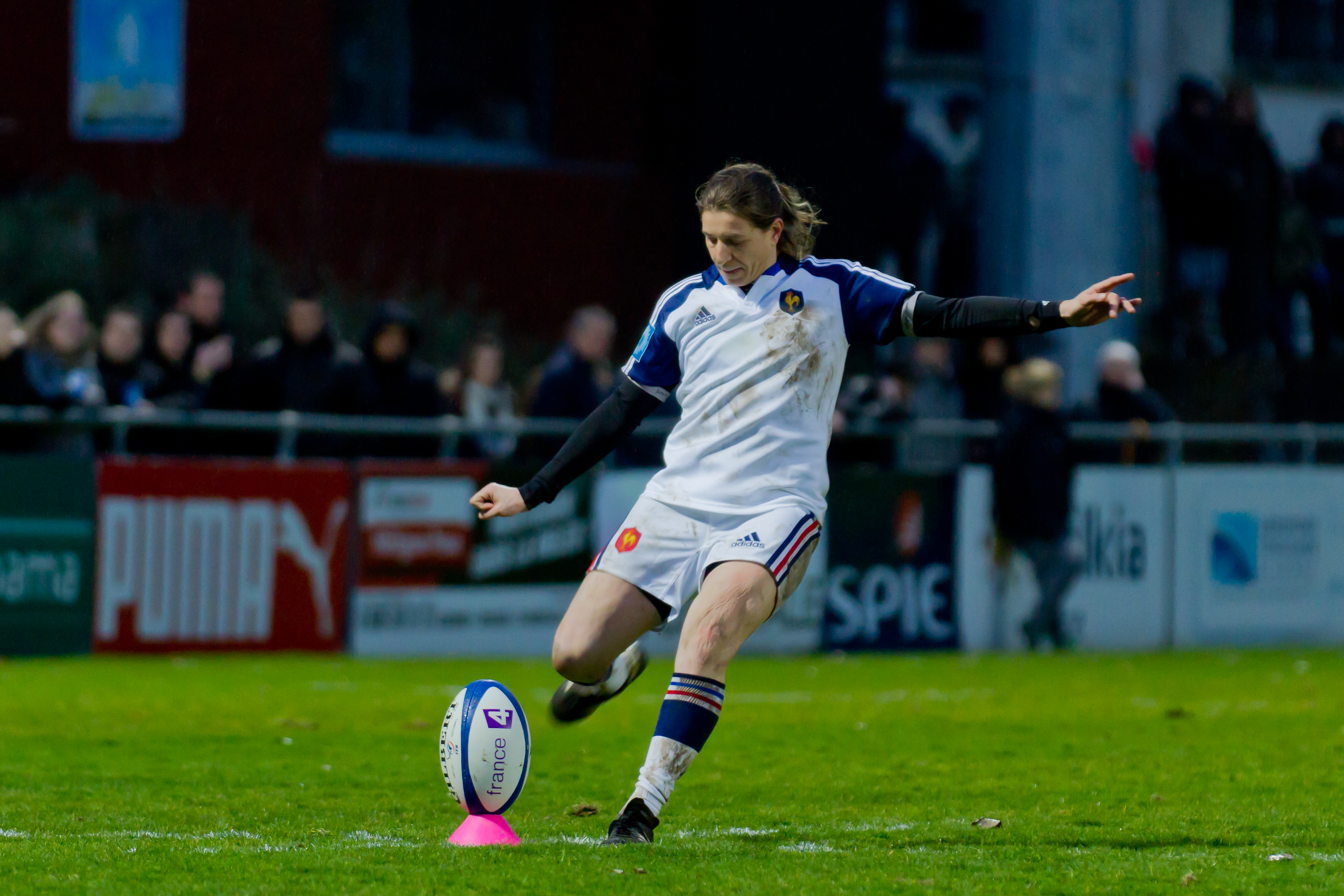
Christelle Le Duff kicking a penalty during France-Italy of the Women 6 nations 2014.

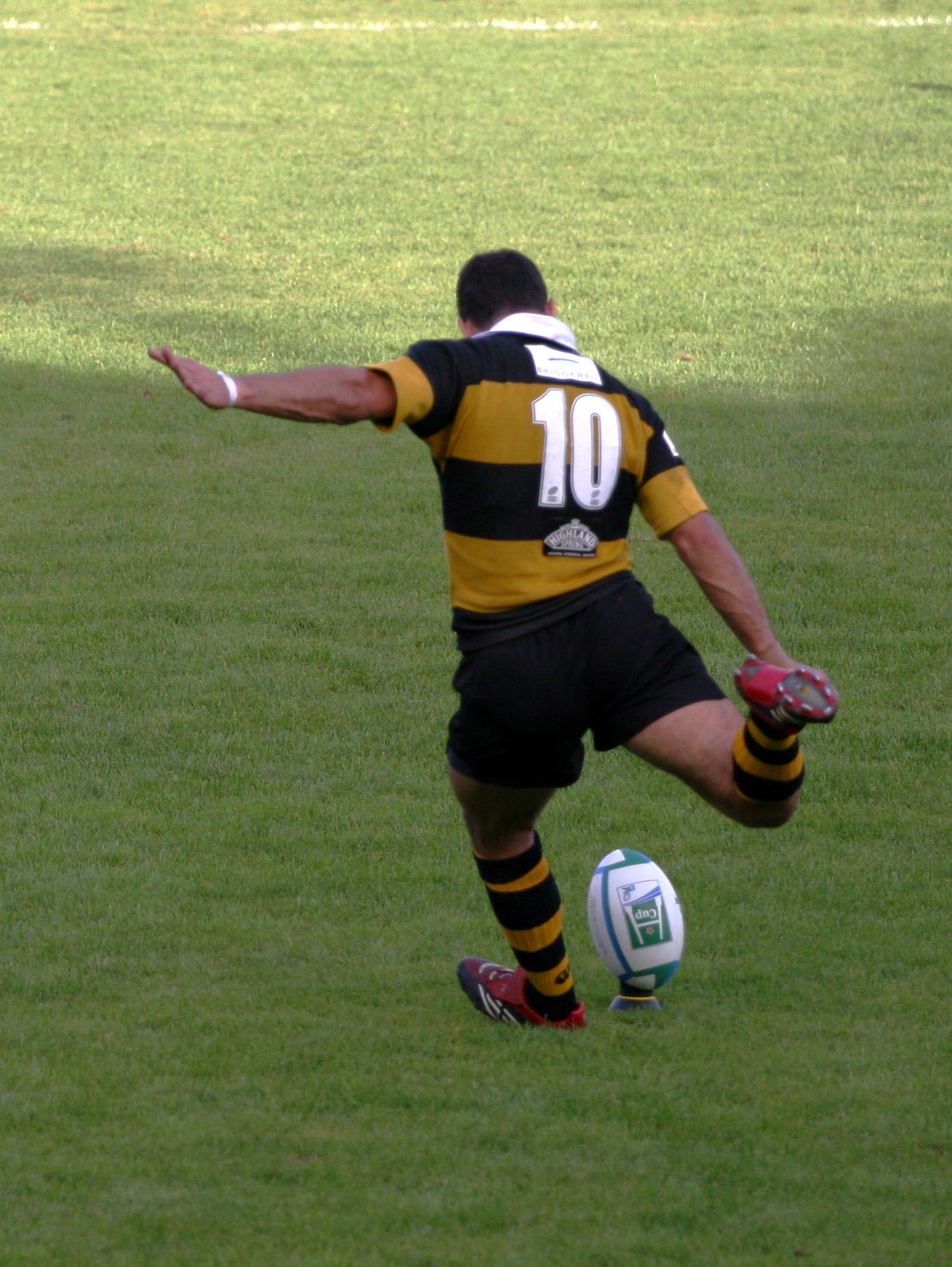
Jeremy Staunton kicking a penalty during London Wasps-USA Perpignan.

== Penalties in rugby league ==
Penalties operate in roughly the same manner as in union, but with some slight differences. Firstly, the implication is that a side either takes a tap kick or a shot at goal. They can kick for touch, but, if the ball makes it into touch, the side then takes a tap kick 10m infield (20m infield in the NRL as of 2007) from the point where the ball went into touch (except where it goes into touch inside the opposition's 10m line, in which case the tap is taken from the 10m line), as opposed to a lineout. They can also tap the ball from where the penalty was awarded. In both instances, the defending side must remain 10m from the ball until the tap kick is taken.

The penalty may also be place-kicked towards goal. If successful, the kicking side scores two points. If the kick is unsuccessful and the ball is caught by the opposition before it leaves the field of play, play continues. If the ball goes into touch-in-goal or over the dead ball line, then play is restarted with a drop-out from the offenders' 20m line.

Penalties may be awarded for:

- Offside
- Tackling an opponent above the shoulders
- Tackling an opponent who is not in possession of the ball
- Tackling a player in midair
- Late hits (such as hitting a ballcarrier already taken to ground)
- Obstructing an opponent from tackling the ball-carrier
- Failing to retreat 10m from an opposition play-the-ball
- If marker at the play-the-ball, failing to stand opposite it
- Not playing the ball correctly at a play-the-ball
- Kicking the ball into touch, touch-in-goal, or over the dead ball line on the full from the kick-off
- Crossing the goal line, not sending the ball ten metres, on sending it into touch on the full from a goal-line drop-out
- Dissent (Disputing a Referee's decision)

There is also a differential penalty, awarded for technical breaches when a scrum is packed (as opposed to foul play within a scrum). A penalty goal cannot be scored from a differential penalty.

== See also ==
- Free kick (rugby union)
- Offside (rugby)
- Professional foul
- Laws of rugby league
- Laws of rugby union
