= 2021 Castleford Tigers season =

English rugby league season

- Super League rank: 7th
- Play-off result: Did not qualify
- Challenge Cup: Runners-up
- 2021 record: Wins: 14; draws: 0; losses: 13
- Points scored: For: 437; against: 552

Team information
- Chairman: Ian Fulton
- Head coach: Daryl Powell
- Captain: Michael Shenton
- Stadium: The Jungle (Wheldon Road)
- Avg. attendance: 4,385 (Note: Not including fixtures played behind closed doors)
- Agg. attendance: 39,468 (Note: Fixtures were played behind closed doors or with reduced capacities due to the COVID-19 pandemic)
- High attendance: 5,126
- Low attendance: 3,600

Top scorers
- Tries: Jordan Turner (17)
- Goals: Danny Richardson (52)
- Points: Danny Richardson (111)
Home colours	Away colours
← 2020	List of seasons	2022 →

The 2021 season was the Castleford Tigers' 96th season in the Rugby Football League and their 14th consecutive season in the top flight of English rugby league. The club competed in the 2021 Super League and the 2021 Challenge Cup.

== Results ==
=== Pre Season ===
W Win D Draw L Loss – Postponed/Cancelled/Expunged

Pre-season results
Date	Versus	H/A	Venue	Result	Score	Tries	Goals	Attendance	Report
14 March	Hull KR	A	Hull College Craven Park	W	30–20				(Note: Adam Milner Testimonial)

=== Super League ===
==== League table ====
Pos	Team	Pld	W	D	L	PF	PA	PP	Pts	PCT	Qualification (Note: Teams must have played at least 70% of scheduled fixtures to qualify for the play-offs.)
1	Catalans Dragons (L)	23	19	0	4	688	398	172.9	38	82.61	Semi-final
2	St. Helens (C)	21	16	0	5	548	229	239.3	32	76.19	Semi-final
3	Warrington Wolves	21	15	1	5	588	354	166.1	31	73.81	Elimination Semi-finals
4	Wigan Warriors	25	15	0	10	387	385	100.5	30	60.00	Elimination Semi-finals
5	Leeds Rhinos	24	13	0	11	556	440	126.4	26	54.17	Elimination Semi-finals
6	Hull Kingston Rovers	20	10	0	10	497	458	108.5	20	50.00	Elimination Semi-finals
7	Castleford Tigers	23	11	0	12	437	552	79.2	22	47.83	
8	Hull FC	21	8	1	12	409	476	85.9	17	40.48	
9	Huddersfield Giants	24	9	0	15	460	516	89.1	18	37.50	
10	Wakefield Trinity	24	9	0	15	482	548	88.0	18	37.50	
11	Salford Red Devils	22	7	0	15	402	584	68.8	14	31.82	
12	Leigh Centurions (R)	22	2	0	20	356	870	40.9	4	9.09	Relegated to the Championship

Rules for classification: 1) win percentage; 2) points scored percentage (points scored divided by points conceded).
(C) Champions; (L) League Leaders' Shield Winners; (R) Relegated

==== Super League results ====
W Win D Draw L Loss – Postponed/Cancelled/Expunged

Date and time	Round	Versus	H/A	Venue	Result	Score	Tries	Goals	Attendance	TV	Report
28 March, 2:00pm	1	Warrington Wolves	N	Emerald Headingley	W	21–12					
2 April, 3:00pm	2	Leeds Rhinos	N	Totally Wicked Stadium	W	18–10					
16 April, 6:00pm	3	Leigh Centurions	H	Mend-A-Hose Jungle	W	52–16					
22 April, 6:00pm	4	Wigan Warriors	A	DW Stadium	L	12–22					
30 April, 7:00pm	5	Salford Red Devils	A	AJ Bell Stadium	W	28–18					
17 May, 7:00pm	6	Hull KR	H	Mend-A-Hose Jungle	L	22–26					
22 May, 3:00pm	7	Warrington Wolves	A	Halliwell Jones Stadium	L	14–38					
28 May, 7:00pm	8	Leeds Rhinos	H	Mend-A-Hose Jungle	L	6–60					
10 June, 7:00pm	9	Hull FC	H	Mend-A-Hose Jungle	L	12–30					
16 June, 7:00pm	10	Wakefield Trinity	A	Mobile Rocket Stadium	W	18–12					
24 June, 7:00pm	11	Catalans Dragons	H	Mend-A-Hose Jungle	L	6–16					
30 June	12	St Helens	H	Mend-A-Hose Jungle	L	0–24	Match forfeited by Castleford.				
6 July	13	Huddersfield Giants	A	John Smith's Stadium	W	24–0	Match forfeited by Huddersfield.				
11 July, 3:00pm	14	Salford Red Devils	H	Mend-A-Hose Jungle	L	18–70					
24 July	15	Catalans Dragons	A	Stade Gilbert Brutus	–	P–P	Postponed under COVID-19 protocols.				
29 July	16	Leigh Centurions	A	Leigh Sports Village	–	P–P	Postponed under COVID-19 protocols.				
2 August, 7:00pm	17	Huddersfield Giants	H	Mend-A-Hose Jungle	L	16–34					
6 August, 7:00pm	18	Leeds Rhinos	A	Emerald Headingley	W	32–18					
12 August, 7:00pm	19	St Helens	A	Totally Wicked Stadium	W	20–10					
21 August, 7:00pm	20	Wakefield Trinity	H	Mend-A-Hose Jungle	W	23–18					
26 August, 7:00pm	21	Hull FC	A	MKM Stadium	W	23–12					
30 August, 5:00pm	22	Wigan Warriors	H	Mend-A-Hose Jungle	L	0–22					
4 September, 2:00pm	23	Salford Red Devils	N	St James' Park	W	29–18					
11 September, 7:00pm	24	Hull KR	A	Hull College Craven Park	L	19–26					
16 September, 7:00pm	25	Warrington Wolves	H	Mend-A-Hose Jungle	L	20–40					

=== Challenge Cup ===
W Win L Loss

Date and time	Round	Versus	H/A	Venue	Result	Score	Tries	Goals	Attendance	TV	Report
9 April, 6:00pm	3	Hull KR	A	Hull College Craven Park	W	33–32 (Note: After golden point extra time)	Trueman, Olpherts (2), McShane (2), Turner	Richardson (4)		Our League	
8 May, 5:30pm	QF	Salford Red Devils	N	Emerald Headingley	W	19–18	Smith, Mata'utia, Shenton	Richardson (2), O'Brien (1 + Drop goal)		BBC Two	
5 June, 5:00pm	SF	Warrington Wolves	N	Leigh Sports Village	W	35–20	O'Brien, Turner (3), Sene-Lefao, McShane	O'Brien (5), McShane (Drop goal)		BBC Two	
17 July, 5:00pm	Final	St Helens	N	Wembley Stadium	L	12–26	Evalds, Trueman	O'Brien (2)		BBC One	

== Players ==
=== 2021 transfers ===
==== Gains ====
Player	Club	Contract	Date
(England) George Lawler	Hull KR	2 Years	October 2021
(England) Alex Sutcliffe	Leeds Rhinos	1 Year (Loan)	November 2020
(Ireland) Lewis Bienek	Hull F.C.	1 Year	November 2020
(England) Gareth O'Brien	Toronto Wolfpack	2 Years	November 2020
(England) Niall Evalds	Salford Red Devils	1 Year	May 2020

==== Losses ====
Player	Club	Contract	Date
(England) Jordan Rankin	Parramatta Eels	1 Year	May 2020
(England) Matt Cook	Widnes Vikings	1 Year	August 2020
Jacob Doyle	Featherstone Rovers	1 Year	September 2020
Joe Summers	Featherstone Rovers	1 Year	September 2020
Lewis Carr	Dewsbury Rams	1 Year	November 2020
(England) Bailey Hodgson	Newcastle Knights	3 Years	November 2020
(England) Callum Turner	Newcastle Thunder	1 Year	November 2020
(England) Mike McMeeken	Catalan Dragons	2 Year	December 2020
(Samoa) Junior Moors	Featherstone Rovers	1 Year	January 2021

=== Statistics ===
==== Top Try Scorers ====
Rank	Player	Tries
1=	(England) Derrell Olpherts	4
1=	(England) Jordan Turner	4
3	(England) Niall Evalds	3
4=	(England) Greg Eden	2
4=	(England) Oliver Holmes	2
4=	(England) Jake Trueman	2
4=	(England) Liam Watts	2
8=	(England) Cheyse Blair	1
8=	(England) Michael Shenton	1
8=	(England) Daniel Smith	1

==== Top Goal Scorers ====
Rank	Player	Goals	Drop Goals
1=	(England) Paul McShane	9	1
1=	(England) Danny Richardson	9	0
3	(England) Gareth O'Brien	3	0

==== Top Points Scorers ====
1=	(England) Derrell Olpherts	24
1=	(England) Jordan Turner	24
3=	(England) Paul McShane	18
3=	(England) Danny Richardson	18
5=	(England) Greg Eden	8
5=	(England) Oliver Holmes	8
5=	(England) Jordan Turner	8
5=	(England) Liam Watts	8

- Updated to match(es) played on 2 May 2021
