= 2020 Castleford Tigers season =

- Super League rank: 8th
- Play-off result: Did not qualify
- Challenge Cup: Sixth round
- 2020 record: Wins: 6; draws: 0; losses: 11
- Points scored: For: 328; against: 379 (Note: Statistics do not include Round 1, because results involving Toronto were expunged following their withdrawal from the league)

Team information
- Chairman: Ian Fulton
- Head Coach: Daryl Powell
- Captain: Michael Shenton
- Stadium: Wheldon Road
- Avg. attendance: 7,773 (Note: Not including fixtures played behind closed doors)
- Agg. attendance: 23,318
- High attendance: 8,848
- Low attendance: 0

Top scorers
- Tries: Greg Eden & Derrell Olpherts (8)
- Goals: Danny Richardson (54)
- Points: Danny Richardson (117)
← 2019	List of seasons	2021 →

The 2020 season was the Castleford Tigers' 95th season in the Rugby Football League and their 13th consecutive season in the top flight of English rugby league. The club competed in the 2020 Super League and the 2020 Challenge Cup.

== Fixtures and results ==
Win Draw Loss

=== Challenge Cup ===
Date and time	Rnd	Versus	H/A	Venue	Result	Score	Tries	Goals	TV	Report
13 September 2020, 3:00pm (Note: Match originally scheduled for 22 August, but postponed due to positive Covid-19 tests among the Hull squad.)	6	Hull FC	N	Totally Wicked Stadium	L	16–29	Griffin, Holmes, Mata'utia	Richardson (2)		Report

=== Regular season ===
Date and time	Rnd	Versus	H/A	Venue	Result	Score	Tries	Goals	Attendance	TV	Report
7 February, 19:45	2	Wigan Warriors	H	The Mend-A-Hose Jungle	W	16–12	Blair, Olpherts,	Richardson (4)	8,848	—N/a	Report
15 February, 18:00	3	Catalans Dragons	A	Stade Gilbert Brutus	L	18–36	Blair, Clare, Olpherts,	Richardson (3)	8,886	—N/a	Report
21 February, 19:45	4	Wakefield Trinity	H	The Mend-A-Hose Jungle	W	32–15	Blair, Clare (2), Olpherts (2), Holmes	Richardson (4)	7,202	Sky Sports	Report
27 February, 19:45	5	Hull KR	A	Kcom Craven Park	W	28–8	Shenton, Richardson, Clare, McMeeken	Richardson (6)	7,464	Sky Sports	Report
6 March, 19:45	6	Warrington Wolves	A	Halliwell Jones Stadium	L	8–9	Turner	Richardson (2)	9,228	Sky Sports	Report
15 March, 15:30	7	St. Helens	H	The Mend-A-Hose Jungle	W	28–14	Olpherts (2), Mata'utia, Blair, Trueman	Richardson (4)	7,268	Sky Sports	Report
8 August 2020, 16:15	8	Catalans Dragons	N	Emerald Headingley	L	14–40	Shenton (2)	Richardson (3)	0 (Note: Match played behind closed doors)	Sky Sports	Report
18 October 2020, 15:00 (Note: Castleford were scheduled to play Hull FC, but due to positive Corona virus cases amongst the Hull squad, this meant that the Round 7 Fixtures were reversed, with Castleford now playing St Helens.)	9	Hull FC	A	KCOM Stadium	L	6–48	O'Neill	Richardson	0		Report
16 August 2020, 16:15	10	St. Helens	A	Totally Wicked Stadium (Note: As a result of the COVID-19 pandemic, all remaining fixtures will resume behind closed doors, at a small number of neutral venues that meet the stringent guidance from both Government and the Game’s clinical advisory group.)	L	0–10	—N/a	—N/a	0	Sky Sports	Report
3 September 2020, 14:30	11	Salford Red Devils	N	Emerald Headingley	W	37–30	Richardson, Shenton, McShane (2), Mcmeeken, Millington	Richardson (6) + (1) DG	0	Sky Sports	Report
10 September 2020, 20:15	12	Warrington Wolves	N	Totally Wicked Stadium	L	10–12	O'Brien, Olpherts	Richardson	0	Sky Sports	Report
24 September 2020, 20:15	13	Huddersfield Giants	N	Halliwell Jones Stadium	L	19–31	O'Brien, Eden, Sanderson	O'Brien (3)	0	Sky Sports	Report
1 October 2020, 19:45	14	Hull FC	H	Mend-A-Hose Jungle	L	28–32	McMeeken (2), Eden, Millington, Shenton	O'Brien (4)	0	Sky Sports	Report
26 October 2020, 19:45	15	Leeds Rhinos	A	Emerald Headingley	L	24–28	Watts Eden (2), Penalty Try,	Richardson	0	Sky Sports	Report
22 October 2020, 18:30	17	Salford Red Devils	N	Totally Wicked Stadium	W	38–24	O'Neill Milner, Foster Eden (3),	Richardson (7)	0	Sky Sports	Report
29 August 2020, 16:15	18	Wigan Warriors (Note: Castleford were due to have a "bye" for this round, but due to positive Corona virus cases amongst the Catalans squad, this meant that the Round 10 Fixture between Wigan and Catalans was called off, with Castleford now set to play Wigan.)	N	Halliwell Jones Stadium	L	22–30	O'Brien, Massey, Olpherts, Shenton	Richardson (3)	0	Sky Sports	Report
C–C	19	Huddersfield Giants (Note: Game postponed on 28 October due to 12 positive COVID-19 cases amongst the Castleford squad.) (Note: Match cancelled after Super League meeting on 3 November rescheduled the play-offs and ended the regular season early.)									
C–C	20	Leeds Rhinos									

== League standings ==
Pos	Team	Pld	W	D	L	PF	PA	PP	Pts	PCT	Qualification (Note: Where teams have the same win percentage, position is decided by points scored percentage (points scored divided by points conceded).)
1	Wigan Warriors (L)	17	13	0	4	408	278	146.8	26	76.47	Semi-finals
2	St Helens (C)	17	12	0	5	469	195	240.5	24	70.59	Semi-finals
3	Warrington Wolves (Note: Salford forfeited a game against Warrington. Under RFL operational rules, the game is recorded as a 24–0 victory for Warrington and converse loss for Salford with the points scored/conceded applying to both teams.)	17	12	0	5	365	204	178.9	24	70.59	Elimination semi-finals
4	Catalans Dragons	13	8	0	5	376	259	145.2	16	61.54	Elimination semi-finals
5	Leeds Rhinos	17	10	0	7	369	390	94.6	20	58.82	Elimination semi-finals
6	Hull F.C.	17	9	0	8	405	436	92.9	18	52.94	Elimination semi-finals
7	Huddersfield Giants (Note: Huddersfield were placed on standby to take the place of any of the four teams in the elimination finals should one be unable to fulfil their fixture.)	18	7	0	11	318	367	86.6	14	38.89	
8	Castleford Tigers	16	6	0	10	328	379	86.5	12	37.50	
9	Salford Red Devils	18	8	0	10	354	469	75.5	10 (Note: Salford deducted 3 wins by the Rugby Football League for failing to meet the terms of a financial commitment agreed in 2013.)	27.78	
10	Wakefield Trinity	19	5	0	14	324	503	64.4	10	26.32	
11	Hull Kingston Rovers	17	3	0	14	290	526	55.1	6	17.65	

Source: BBC Sport
Rules for classification: 1) Points; 2) Points difference; 3) Number of points scored;
(C) Champions; (L) League Leaders' Shield Winners

== Discipline ==
Red Cards

Rank	Player	Red Cards
1	(England) Oliver Holmes	1

Yellow Cards

Rank	Player	Yellow Cards
1=	(Samoa) Peter Mata'utia	1
1=	(England) Grant Millington	1
1=	(England) Derrell Olpherts	1

== Player statistics ==
#	Player	Position	Tries	Goals	DG	Points
1	Jordan Rankin	Fullback	0	0	0	0
2	Derrell Olpherts	Wing	8	0	0	32
3	Peter Mata'utia	Centre	2	0	0	8
4	Michael Shenton	Centre	7	0	0	28
5	Sosaia Feki	Wing	0	0	0	0
6	Jake Trueman	Stand-off	1	0	0	4
7	Danny Richardson	Scrum-half	2	54	1	117
8	Liam Watts	Prop	1	0	0	4
9	Paul McShane	Hooker	2	0	0	8
10	Grant Millington	Prop	3	0	0	12
11	Oliver Holmes	Second-row	2	0	0	8
12	Mike McMeeken	Second-row	4	0	0	16
13	Adam Milner	Loose forward	2	0	0	8
14	Nathan Massey	Loose forward	0	0	0	0
15	Jesse Sene-Lefao	Second-row	0	0	0	0
16	George Griffin	Prop	0	0	0	0
17	Alex Foster	Second-row	1	0	0	4
18	Cheyse Blair	Second-row	4	0	0	16
19	Daniel Smith	Prop	0	0	0	0
20	Junior Moors	Second-row	0	0	0	0
21	James Clare	Wing	4	0	0	16
22	Jacques O'Neill	Hooker	2	0	0	8
23	Matt Cook	Prop	0	0	0	0
24	Tyla Hepi	Prop	0	0	0	0
25	Greg Eden	Wing	8	0	0	32
26	Calum Turner	Fullback	1	0	0	4
27	Lewis Peachey	Second-row	0	0	0	0
28	Brad Graham	Centre	0	0	0	0
29	Joe Summers	Loose forward	0	0	0	0
30	Robbie Storey	Centre	0	0	0	0
31	Brad Martin	Second-row	0	0	0	0
32	Sam Hall	Prop	0	0	0	0
33	Bailey Hodgson	Fullback	0	0	0	0
34	Gareth O'Brien	Fullback	3	7	1	27
35	Jack Sanderson	Wing	1	0	0	4
36	Dan Fleming	Prop	0	0	0	0
37	Cain Robb	Hooker	0	0	0	0

== 2020 squad ==
2020 Castleford Tigers Squad
First team squad			Coaching staff
1 Jordan Rankin – FB, SH; 2 Derrell Olpherts – WG; 3 Peter Mata'utia – CE, FB, SO; 4 Michael Shenton (c) – CE; 5 Sosaia Feki – WG; 6 Jake Trueman – SO, SH; 7 Danny Richardson – SH, SO; 8 Liam Watts – PR; 9 Paul McShane – HK, SH; 10 Grant Millington – PR, SR, LF; 11 Oliver Holmes – SR; 12 Mike McMeeken – SR; 13 Adam Milner – LF, HK	14 Nathan Massey – LF, PR; 15 Jesse Sene-Lefao – SR, PR; 16 George Griffin – PR, SR; 17 Alex Foster – SR, CE, LF; 18 Cheyse Blair – SR, CE; 19 Daniel Smith – PR; 20 Junior Moors – SR, PR, LF; 21 James Clare – WG, FB; 22 Jacques O'Neill – HK, LF; 23 Matt Cook – PR; 24 Tyla Hepi – PR; 25 Greg Eden – WG, FB; 26 Calum Turner – FB, SO	27 Lewis Peachey – SR; 28 Brad Graham – CE, WG; 29 Joe Summers – LF, SR; 30 Robbie Storey – CE, SR; 31 Brad Martin – SR, PR; 32 Sam Hall – PR; 33 Bailey Hodgson – FB; 34 Gareth O'Brien – FB, SH; 35 Jack Sanderson – WG; 36 Dan Fleming – PR; 37 Cain Robb – HK	Head coach: Daryl Powell; Assistant coaches: Ryan Sheridan; Danny Orr; Legend: (c) Captain(s); (vc) Vice-captain(s)

== 2020 transfers ==
Gains

Player	Club	Contract	Date
Tyla Hepi	Toulouse Olympique	1 Year	June 2019
George Griffin	Salford Red Devils	2 Years	July 2019
Derrell Olpherts	Salford Red Devils	3 Years	July 2019
Sosaia Feki	Cronulla Sharks	3 Years	July 2019
Jordan Rankin	Huddersfield Giants	1 Year	October 2019
Danny Richardson	St Helens	3 Years	October 2019

Losses

Player	Club	Contract	Date
Mitch Clark	Wigan Warriors	2 Years	July 2019
Cory Aston	London Broncos	2 Years	July 2019
Will Maher	Hull KR	2 Years	August 2019
Greg Minikin	Hull KR	3 Years	August 2019
Tuoyo Egodo	London Broncos	2 Years	August 2019
Kieran Gill	Newcastle	1 Year	September 2019
Joe Wardle	Huddersfield Giants	1 Year	October 2019
Luke Gale	Leeds Rhinos	2 Years	October 2019
Chris Clarkson	York City Knights	1 Year	October 2019
Jake Sweeting	Featherstone Rovers	1 Year	October 2019
Jamie Ellis	Hull KR	1 Year	December 2019

Castleford also agreed dual registration partnerships with the York City Knights in the RFL Championship and the Keighley Cougars in League 1.
