= 2015 Castleford Tigers season =

English rugby league season

- Super League rank: 5th
- Play-off result: Did not qualify
- Challenge Cup: Sixth round
- 2015 record: Wins: 16; draws: 0; losses: 15
- Points scored: For: 745; against: 786

Team information
- Chairman: Jack Fulton
- Head coach: Daryl Powell
- Captain: Michael Shenton
- Stadium: The Jungle (Wheldon Road)

Top scorers
- Tries: Justin Carney & Denny Solomona (18)
- Goals: Luke Gale (102)
- Points: Luke Gale (249)
← 2014	List of seasons	2016 →

The 2015 season was the Castleford Tigers' 90th season in the Rugby Football League and their 8th consecutive season in the top flight of English rugby league. The club competed in the 2015 Super League and the 2015 Challenge Cup.

== Results ==
=== Pre-season friendlies ===
W Win D Draw L Loss

Date	Opposition	H/A	Venue	Result	Score	Tries	Goals	Attendance
Sun 28 December	Featherstone Rovers	H	Wheldon Road	W	18–0	Solomona, Cook, Tansey	Finn (3)	4,800
Sun 11 January (Note: Andy Lynch's testimonial match)	Bradford Bulls	H	Wheldon Road	W	22–14	Carney, Gibson, S. Moore, McMeeken	Gale (3)	3,844
Sun 18 January	Doncaster RLFC	A	Keepmoat Stadium	W	32–12	Gibson (2), Massey, Roberts, T. Holmes, Solomona	Finn (2), Gale (2)	1,200
Sun 25 January	Widnes Vikings	H	Wheldon Road	W	20–18	Solomona (2), Roberts, Finn	Gale (2)	2,141

=== Super League ===
==== Table ====
Pos	Team	Pld	W	D	L	PF	PA	PD	Pts	Qualification
1	Leeds Rhinos	23	16	1	6	758	477	+281	33	Super League Super 8s
2	St Helens	23	16	0	7	598	436	+162	32	Super League Super 8s
3	Wigan Warriors	23	15	1	7	589	413	+176	31	Super League Super 8s
4	Huddersfield Giants	23	13	2	8	538	394	+144	28	Super League Super 8s
5	Castleford Tigers	23	13	0	10	547	505	+42	26	Super League Super 8s
6	Warrington Wolves	23	12	0	11	552	456	+96	24	Super League Super 8s
7	Hull F.C.	23	11	0	12	452	484	−32	22	Super League Super 8s
8	Catalans Dragons	23	9	2	12	561	574	−13	20	Super League Super 8s
9	Widnes Vikings	23	9	1	13	518	565	−47	19	The Qualifiers
10	Hull Kingston Rovers	23	9	0	14	534	646	−112	18	The Qualifiers
11	Salford Red Devils	23	8	1	14	447	617	−170	17	The Qualifiers
12	Wakefield Trinity Wildcats	23	3	0	20	402	929	−527	6	The Qualifiers

Source: Rugby League Project
Rules for classification: 1) Points; 2) Points difference; 3) Number of points scored;

==== Super League results ====
W Win D Draw L Loss

Super League results
Date	Round	Versus	H/A	Venue	Result	Score	Tries	Goals	Attendance	Live on TV	Report
8 February	1	Wakefield Trinity	H	The Jungle	L	22–24	Solomona (2), Gale, Carney	Gale 3/4	10,728	-	
14 February	2	Catalans Dragons	A	Stade Gilbert Brutus	L	12–13	Carney, Tansey	Gale 2/2	6,584	Sky Sports	
27 February	3	St. Helens	A	Langtree Park	L	14-21	Carney (2), Tansey	Gale 1/3	-	Sky Sports	
6 March	4	Wigan Warriors	H	The Jungle	W	42–14	Carney (2), Clare, Dorn, Finn, O. Holmes, Shenton	Gale 7/7	7,772	-	
12 March	5	Huddersfield Giants	A	Galpharm Stadium	L	0–22	-	-	5,257	Sky Sports	
20 March	6	Salford Red Devils	H	The Jungle	W	30–16	Carney (2), Finn, Shenton, Wheeldon, Clare	Gale 3/6	6,901	-	
27 March	7	Hull F.C.	H	The Jungle	W	20–14	Gale (2), Carney, Clare	Gale 2/4	8,744	-	
3 April	8	Leeds Rhinos	H	The Jungle	L	12–26	Shenton (2)	Gale 2/2	11,323	Sky Sports	
6 April	9	Warrington Wolves	A	Halliwell Jones Stadium	W	22–14	Tansey, Dorn, Milner, Roberts	Gale 3/4	8,518	Sky Sports	
11 April	10	Hull Kingston Rovers	H	The Jungle	W	25–4	Tansey, Gale, Massey, Mariano	Gale 4/4, Gale 1 DG	6,012	Sky Sports	
19 April	11	Widnes Vikings	A	Halton Stadium	L	16–46	Roberts, O. Holmes, Shenton	Finn 2/3	5,257	-	
26 April	12	Salford Red Devils	A	AJ Bell Stadium	W	22–20	Gibson (2), Massey, Robson	Gale 3/4	2,800	-	
3 May	13	Catalans Dragons	H	The Jungle	W	36–28	Gibson, Channing, Millington, Shenton, Tansey, S. Moore	Gale 6/6	5,704	-	
8 May	14	Wigan Warriors	A	DW Stadium	L	0–28	-	-	15,022	-	
21 May	15	Huddersfield Giants	H	The Jungle	L	16–24	Webster, Roberts, Shenton	Gale 2/3	4,634	Sky Sports	
31 May	16	Wakefield Trinity	N (Note: Magic Weekend)	St James' Park	W	56–16	Solomona (4), Tansey, Shenton, Gibson (3), Gale	Gale 8/10	26,970	Sky Sports	
5 June	17	Hull Kingston Rovers	A	Craven Park	W	30–22	Roberts, Solomona, O. Holmes, Gale, Finn	Gale 5/5	7,093	-	
11 June	18	Leeds Rhinos	A	Headingley Stadium	W	31–24	Millington, Finn, Shenton, Solomona (2)	Gale 5/5, Finn 1 DG	15,089	Sky Sports	
18 June	19	St. Helens	H	The Jungle	W	25–24	Carney, Solomona, Webster, Cook	Gale 4/4, Roberts 1 DG	6,086	Sky Sports	
5 July	20	Widnes Vikings	H	The Jungle	W	34–20	Solomona (3), Webster, Cook, Carney	Gale 5/6	7,002	-	
12 July	21	Hull F.C.	A	KC Stadium	L	18–21	Solomona (2), Dorn, Roberts	Finn 1/4	10,114	-	
19 July	22	Wakefield Trinity	A	Belle Vue	W	58–20	Millington, Gale, McMeeken, O. Holmes, Dorn (2), Carney (4)	Gale 9/10	4,000	-	
26 July	23	Warrington Wolves	H	The Jungle	L	6–44	Moors	Finn 1/1	7,239	-	

=== Super 8s ===
==== Table ====
Pos	Team	Pld	W	D	L	PF	PA	PD	Pts	Qualification
1	Leeds Rhinos (L, C)	30	20	1	9	944	650	+294	41	Semi-finals
2	Wigan Warriors	30	20	1	9	798	530	+268	41	Semi-finals
3	Huddersfield Giants	30	18	2	10	750	534	+216	38	Semi-finals
4	St Helens	30	19	0	11	766	624	+142	38	Semi-finals
5	Castleford Tigers	30	16	0	14	731	746	−15	32	
6	Warrington Wolves	30	15	0	15	714	636	+78	30	
7	Catalans Dragons	30	13	2	15	739	770	−31	28	
8	Hull F.C.	30	12	0	18	620	716	−96	24	

Source: Rugby League Project
(C) Champions; (L) League Leaders' Shield Winners

==== Super 8s results ====
W Win D Draw L Loss

Super 8s results
Date	Round	Versus	H/A	Venue	Result	Score	Tries	Goals	Attendance	Live on TV	Report
7 July	S1	Hull F.C.	H	The Jungle	W	36–30	Shenton (4), Gale, Gibson	Gale 6/6	6,760	Sky Sports	
13 August	S2	Warrington Wolves	H	The Jungle	W	17–16	Carney (2), Shenton	Gale 2/4, Finn 1 DG	5,212	Sky Sports	
22 August	S3	Catalans Dragons	A	Stade Gilbert Brutus	L	26–44	Carney, O. Holmes, Milner (2), Moors	Gale 3/5	7,473	Sky Sports	
3 September	S4	Huddersfield Giants	A	Galpharm Stadium	L	26–40	Gale, Gibson, Dorn, Roberts, Solomona	Gale 3/5	5,350	Sky Sports	
10 September	S5	St. Helens	H	The Jungle	L	38–42	Dorn (2), Roberts (2), Solomona, Moors	Gale 7/7	5,253	Sky Sports	
17 September	S6	Leeds Rhinos	A	Headingley Stadium	W	29–22	Gale (2), Solomona, Dorn, Roberts	Gale 4/5, Roberts 1 DG	15,069	Sky Sports	
25 September	S7	Wigan Warriors	A	DW Stadium	L	12–47	Dorn, Moors	Gale 2/2	15,070	Sky Sports	

=== Challenge Cup ===
W Win L Loss

Challenge Cup results
Date	Round	Versus	H/A	Venue	Result	Score	Tries	Goals	Attendance	Live on TV	Report
16 May	6	Hull F.C.	A	KC Stadium	L	14–40	Gibson, Clare, McMeeken	Gale 1/3	6,715	-	

== Players ==
=== First team squad ===
2015 Castleford Tigers squad
First team squad			Coaching staff
(Australia) 1 Luke Dorn (vc) – FB; (England) 2 James Clare – WG; (New Zealand) 3 Jake Webster – CE, SR; (England) 4 Michael Shenton (c) – CE; (Australia) 5 Justin Carney – WG; (Samoa) 6 Ben Roberts – SO, FB; (England) 7 Luke Gale (vc) – SH; (England) 8 Andy Lynch – PR; (England) 9 Adam Milner – HK; (Australia) 10 Grant Millington – PR, LF, SR; (England) 11 Oliver Holmes – SR; (England) 12 Matt Cook – PR, SR; (England) 13 Nathan Massey – LF, PR	(England) 14 Lee Jewitt – PR, LF; (Ireland) 15 Ryan Boyle – PR; (Samoa) 16 Junior Moors – SR, PR; (England) 17 Scott Moore – HK; (Scotland) 18 Frankie Mariano – SR; (England) 19 Scott Wheeldon – PR, LF; (Samoa) 20 Denny Solomona – WG; (Ireland) 21 Liam Finn – SO; (England) 22 Jordan Tansey – FB; (Wales) 23 Michael Channing – CE; (England) 24 Mike McMeeken – SR, CE; (England) 25 Steve Crossley – PR; (England) 26 Ashley Gibson – CE, WG	(England) 27 Ash Robson – FB; (England) 28 Will Maher – PR; (England) 29 Jordan Howden – SO, FB; (England) 30 Brandon Westerman – SR; (England) 31 Brandon Moore – HK; (England) 32 Tom Holmes – SH; (England) 33 Ryan Bailey – PR; (France) 34 Gadwin Springer – PR; (England) 35 Paul McShane – HK	Head coach: (England) Daryl Powell; Assistant coaches: (England) Danny Orr; (Ireland) Ryan Sheridan; Legend: (c) Captain(s); (vc) Vice-captain(s)

=== Transfers and loans ===
==== Transfers in ====
No	Player	From	Contract	Date	Ref.
16	(Samoa) Junior Moors	Melbourne Storm	3 years	11 June 2014	
6	(Samoa) Ben Roberts	Melbourne Storm	2 years	7 July 2014	
20	(Samoa) Denny Solomona	London Broncos	2 years	14 July 2014	
12	(England) Matt Cook	London Broncos	2 years	21 July 2014	
25	(England) Steve Crossley	Featherstone Rovers	2 years	4 August 2014	
7	(England) Luke Gale	Bradford Bulls	2 years	28 August 2014	
17	(England) Scott Moore	London Broncos	2 years	11 September 2014	
24	(England) Mike McMeeken	London Broncos	2 years	11 September 2014	
33	(England) Ryan Bailey	Hull Kingston Rovers	½ year	20 April 2015	
34	(France) Gadwin Springer	Catalans Dragons	2½ years	12 June 2015	
35	(England) Paul McShane	Wakefield Trinity Wildcats	2½ years	23 July 2015	

==== Transfers out ====
No	Player	To	Contract	Date	Ref.
12	(New Zealand) Weller Hauraki	Salford Red Devils	3 years	12 June 2014	
25	(Wales) Dan Fleming	Bradford Bulls	2 years	25 July 2014	
14	(England) Daryl Clark	Warrington Wolves	4 years	27 August 2014	
17	(Scotland) Lee Gilmour	Wakefield Trinity Wildcats	2 years (Note: Initially joined on loan during the 2014 season, with the deal being made permanent ahead of 2015)	4 September 2014	
10	(England) Craig Huby	Huddersfield Giants	4 years	11 September 2014	
31	(England) Brad Day	Batley Bulldogs	1 year	13 September 2014	
20	(England) Jamie Ellis	Huddersfield Giants	2 years	1 October 2014	
22	(England) Richard Owen	Wakefield Trinity Wildcats	3 years	20 October 2014	
28	(England) Ben Reynolds	Leigh Centurions	1 year	30 October 2014	
2	(England) Kirk Dixon	Retired		7 January 2015	
35	(England) Garreth Carvell	Featherstone Rovers	2 years	27 January 2015	
25	(England) Steve Crossley	Bradford Bulls	1½ years	24 April 2025	
22	(England) Jordan Tansey	Wakefield Trinity Wildcats	1½ years	26 June 2015	
2	(England) James Clare	Bradford Bulls	1½ years	23 July 2015	

==== Loans out ====
No	Player	To	Loan type	Departure	Return	Ref.
17	(England) Scott Moore	Wakefield Trinity Wildcats	Season-long	23 July 2015	Permanent (Note: The deal was made permanent on 9 November 2015)	

==== Dual registration ====
Castleford agreed to extend their dual registration partnership with York City Knights in League 1 for a second season.

Club	No	Player	App	T	G	DG	Pts
York City Knights	2	(England) James Clare	7	9	0	0	36
York City Knights	23	(Wales) Michael Channing	7	1	0	0	4
York City Knights	29	(England) Jordan Howden	17	8	12	1	57

Source: RLRKC – York City Knights 2015

=== Player appearances: League ===
- Super League Only

FB=Fullback	C=Centre	W=Winger	SO=Stand-off	SH=Scrum half	PR=Prop	H=Hooker	SR=Second Row	L=Loose forward	B=Bench

No	Player	1	2	3	4	5	6	7	8	9	10	11	12	13	14	15	16	17	18	19	20	21	22	23	S1	S2	S3	S4	S5	S6	S7
1	Luke Dorn				FB	FB	FB		FB	FB											FB	FB	FB	FB		B		FB	FB	FB	FB
2	James Clare	x	x	x	W	W	W	W	W			W	W		W						x	x	x	x	x	x	x	x	x	x	x
3	Jake Webster	B	B		C	C	C	SR	SR						B	C	C	C	C	C	C	C		C	C	C					
4	Michael Shenton	C	C	C	C		C	C	C	C	C	C	C	C	C	C	C	C	C	C	C	C	C	C	C	C	C		C	C	
5	Justin Carney	W	W	W	W	W	W	W	W	W	W									W	W	W	W	W	W	W	W	Red card	Red card	Red card	Red card
6	Ben Roberts		SO		B	B	B	B		SO	SO	SO	SO		B	SO		FB	FB	FB	B	SO	B	B	B	FB	FB	SO	SO	SO	SO
7	Luke Gale	SH	SH	SH	SH	SH	SH	SH	SH	SH	SH		SH	SH	SH	SH	SH	SH	SH	SH	SH		SH	SH	SH	SH	SH	SH	SH	SH	SH
8	Andy Lynch	P	P	P		P		B	P	P	P	P	P	P		P	P	P	P	P	P	P	P	P	P	P	P	P	P	P	P
9	Adam Milner	B		B	H		H	H	B	B	B	B	B		H	H	B	H	B	B	H	H	H	H	B	H	H	H	H	H	H
10	Grant Millington	P	P	P	P	P	P	P	P	B	B	SR	SR	B	B	B	P	P	P	P	P	P	P	P	P	P	P	SR	P	P	P
11	Oliver Holmes	SR	SR	SR	SR	SR	SR	SR	SR		SR	SR	SR	SR		SR	SR	SR	SR	SR	SR	SR	SR	SR	SR	SR	SR		SR	SR	
12	Matt Cook			B	P	B	P		B	SR										B	B	L	B	B	B	B	B	B		B	B
13	Nathan Massey	L	L	L	L	L	L		L	L	L	L	L	L		L	L	L	L	L	L				L	L	L	L			
14	Lee Jewitt	x	x	x	x	x	x	x	x	x	B	B	B		L	B															
15	Ryan Boyle	B	x	B	B	x	B	x	B	B	B	B		B	P		B	B	B			B	B	B				B	B	B	
16	Junior Moors	SR	SR	SR	SR	SR	SR	P					B		SR		B	B	B	B	B	B	B	B	SR	B	B	SR	SR	SR	SR
17	Scott Moore	H	H	H					H	H	H	H	H	H			H			H		B		x	x	x	x	x	x	x	x
18	Frankie Mariano	x	x	x	x	x	x	x	x	SR	SR			SR	SR	SR															
19	Scott Wheeldon	x	B	x	B	B	B	L	B	P	P	P	P		B									x	x	x	x	P	L	L	L
20	Denny Solomona	W	W	W												W	W	W	W	W	W	W	W					W	W	W	W
21	Liam Finn	SO	B	SO	SO	SO	SO	SO	SO			SH		SO	SO	B	SO	SO	SO	SO	SO	SH	SO	SO	SO	SO	SO				
22	Jordan Tansey	FB	FB	FB				FB		W	FB	FB	FB	FB	FB	FB	FB	B				x	x	x	x	x	x	x	x	x	x
23	Michael Channing	x	C	C	x	C	x	x	x	C	C	C	x	C	C												C	C			
24	Mike McMeeken	x	x	B	x	x	B	B	x	x	x	x	x	x	x	B	SR	SR	SR	SR	SR	SR	SR	SR	B	SR	SR	C	C	C	C
25	Steve Crossley	B	B	x	B	B	x	B				B	x	x	x	x	x	x	x	x	x	x	x	x	x	x	x	x	x	x	x
26	Ashley Gibson	C	x	x	x	x	x	C	C	W	W	x	C	C	W	W	W	W	W				C	W	W	W	W	W	W	W	C
27	Ashley Robson	x	x	x	x	x	x	x	x	x	x	x	W	W										x	x	x	x	x	x	x	W
28	Will Maher	x	x	x	x	x	x	x	x	B	x	x	B	B	x	x	B	B	x	x	x	x	x	x	x	x	x	x	B	B	B
29	Jordan Howden	x	x	x	x	x	x	x	x	x	x	x	x	x	x	x	x	x	x	x	x	x	x	x	x	x	x	x	x	x	x
30	Brandon Westerman	x	x	x	x	x	x	x	x	x	x	x	x	x	x	x	x	x	x	x	x	x	x	x	x	x	x	x	x	x	x
31	Brandon Moore	x	x	x	x	H	x	x	x	x	x	x	x	x	x	x	x	x	H	x	x	x	x	x	x	x	x	x	x	x	x
32	Tom Holmes	x	x	x	x	x	x	x	x	x	x	x	x	B	x	x	x	x	x	x	x	x	x	x	x	x	x	x	x	x	SR
33	Ryan Bailey	x	x	x	x	x	x	x	x	x	x	x	x	P	P	P			B	B											
34	Gadwin Springer	x	x	x	x	x	x	x	x	x	x	x	x	x	x	x	x	x	x	x	B	B	L	L	B	B	B	B	B		B
35	Paul McShane	x	x	x	x	x	x	x	x	x	x	x	x	x	x	x	x	x	x	x	x	x	x	x	H		B	B	B	B	B

= Injured

= Suspended

=== Player appearances: Cup ===
- Challenge Cup Games only

FB=Fullback	C=Centre	W=Winger	SO=Stand Off	SH=Scrum half	P=Prop	H=Hooker	SR=Second Row	L=Loose forward	B=Bench

No	Player	6
1	Luke Dorn	
2	James Clare	W
3	Jake Webster	C
4	Michael Shenton	C
5	Justin Carney	
6	Ben Roberts	SO
7	Luke Gale	SH
8	Andy Lynch	P
9	Adam Milner	H
10	Grant Millington	B
11	Oliver Holmes	SR
12	Matt Cook	
13	Nathan Massey	L
14	Lee Jewitt	B
15	Ryan Boyle	
16	Junior Moors	SR
17	Scott Moore	
18	Frankie Mariano	x
19	Scott Wheeldon	x
20	Denny Solomona	
21	Liam Finn	B
22	Jordan Tansey	FB
23	Michael Channing	
24	Mike McMeeken	B
26	Ashley Gibson	W
27	Ashley Robson	x
28	Will Maher	x
29	Jordan Howden	x
30	Brandon Westerman	x
31	Brandon Moore	x
32	Tom Holmes	x
33	Ryan Bailey	P

=== Player statistics ===
==== Summary ====
Appearances and points in all competitions
No	Player	App	T	G	DG	Pts
1	(Australia) Luke Dorn	14	10	0	0	40
2	(England) James Clare	9	4	0	0	16
3	(New Zealand) Jake Webster	19	3	0	0	12
4	(England) Michael Shenton	28	14	0	0	56
5	(Australia) Justin Carney	18	18	0	0	72
6	(Samoa) Ben Roberts	26	9	0	2	38
7	(England) Luke Gale	29	11	102	1	249
8	(England) Andy Lynch	28	0	0	0	0
9	(England) Adam Milner	28	3	0	0	12
10	(Australia) Grant Millington	31	3	0	0	12
11	(England) Oliver Holmes	28	5	0	0	20
12	(England) Matt Cook	17	2	0	0	8
13	(England) Nathan Massey	23	2	0	0	8
14	(England) Lee Jewitt	6	0	0	0	0
15	(Ireland) Ryan Boyle	19	0	0	0	0
16	(Samoa) Junior Moors	25	4	0	0	16
17	(England) Scott Moore	14	1	0	0	4
18	(Scotland) Frankie Mariano	5	1	0	0	4
19	(England) Scott Wheeldon	15	1	0	0	4
20	(Samoa) Denny Solomona	15	18	0	0	72
21	(Ireland) Liam Finn	24	4	4	2	26
22	(England) Jordan Tansey	14	6	0	0	24
23	(Wales) Michael Channing	10	1	0	0	4
24	(England) Mike McMeeken	20	2	0	0	8
25	(England) Steve Crossley	6	0	0	0	0
26	(England) Ashley Gibson	22	9	0	0	36
27	(England) Ash Robson	3	1	0	0	4
28	(England) Will Maher	8	0	0	0	0
29	(England) Jordan Howden	0	0	0	0	0
30	(England) Brandon Westerman	0	0	0	0	0
31	(England) Brandon Moore	0	0	0	0	0
32	(England) Tom Holmes	1	0	0	0	0
33	(England) Ryan Bailey	6	0	0	0	0
34	(France) Gadwin Springer	10	0	0	0	0
35	(England) Paul McShane	6	0	0	0	0

Source: RLRKC – Castleford Tigers 2015
