= Cory Blair =

US international rugby union player

- Born: 28 June 1985 (age 41) Coolangatta, Queensland, Australia
- Height: 1.89 m (6 ft 2 1/2 in)
- Weight: 97 kg (214 lb)

Rugby union career
- Position: Centre/Fullback
- Current team: Huntington Beach
Amateur team(s)
Years	Team	Apps	(Points)
- Huntington Beach
International career
Years	Team	Apps	(Points)
- USA
National sevens team
Years	Team		Comps
2006–2010	Griffins, Belmont Shore RFC		
- Correct as of 18 November 2010

Cory Blair (born 28 June 1985) is an Australian born American rugby union and rugby league footballer.

== Background ==
His younger brother, Cheyse Blair, played for Melbourne Storm in the National Rugby League.

== Playing career ==
=== Rugby union ===
Blair played centre for his club, Huntington Beach, in California. He was selected to tour with the USA national rugby union team, the USA Eagles XV, for the Autumn 2010 tour of Europe. Blair also played for the United States men's national rugby sevens team

=== Rugby league ===
In 2010 he was named in the 40-man train on squad United States national rugby league team for the 2010 Atlantic Cup but was not selected in the final 22-man squad for the tournament.

Blair rugby league for the Bilambil Jets, with whom he won in the Gold Coast Tweed premiership in the 2011 season. In 2012, Blair joined the Tweed Heads Seagulls in the Queensland Cup. He returned to Bilambil for the 2015 season, before re-joining the Seagulls in 2016. Blair announced his retirement at the end of the 2016 season.
