= Danny Richardson (rugby league) =

English professional rugby league footballer

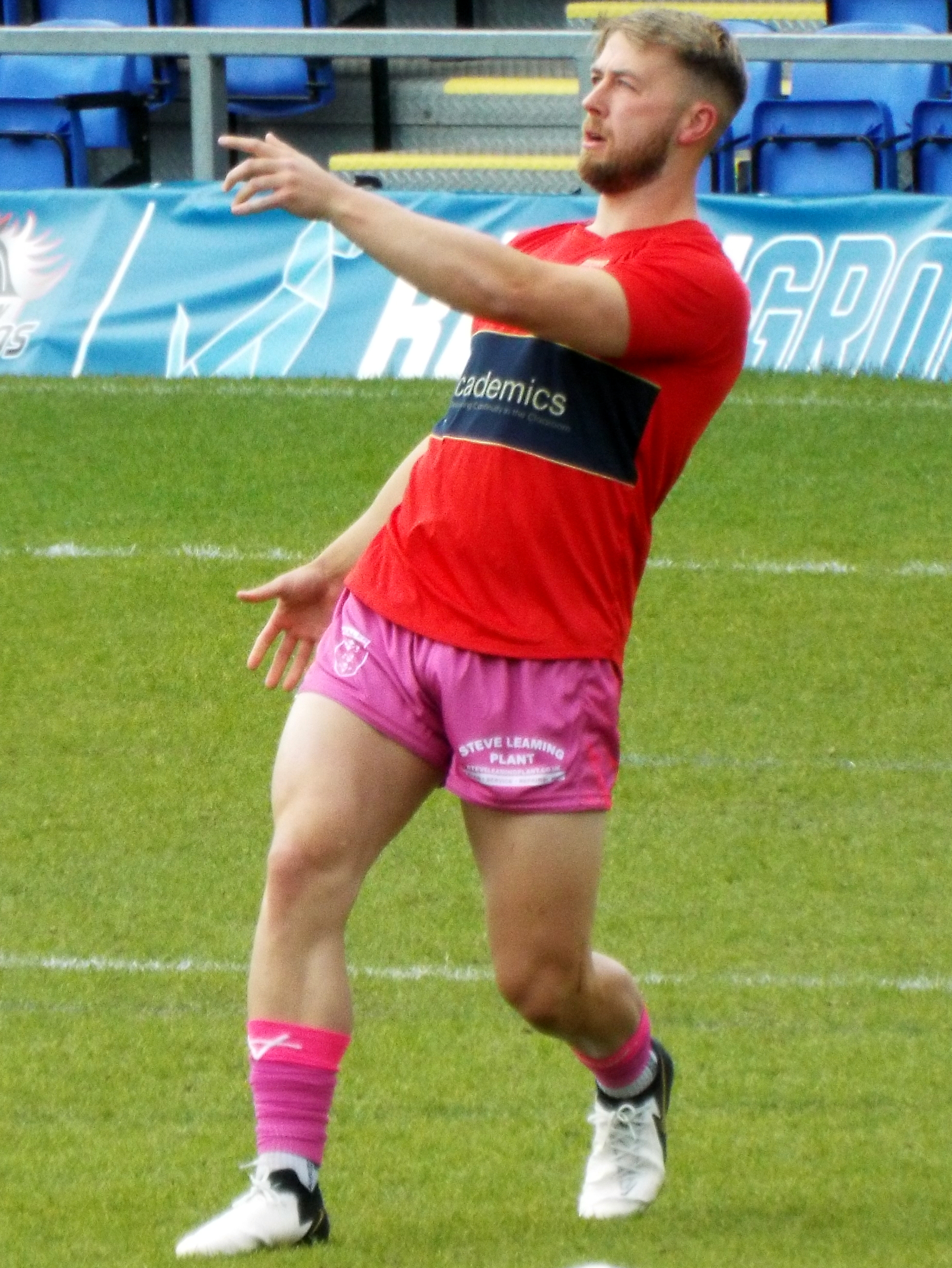

Personal information
- Full name: Daniel Richardson
- Born: 2 September 1996 (age 30) Widnes, Cheshire, England
- Height: 5 ft 11 in (1.80 m)
- Weight: 13 st 5 lb (85 kg)

Playing information
- Position: Scrum-half, Stand-off
Club
Years	Team	Pld	T	G	FG	P
2017–19	St Helens	59	10	175	9	399
2017(DR)	→ Sheffield Eagles	1	1	7	0	18
2019(DR)	→ Leigh Centurions	6	0	9	0	18
2020–24	Castleford Tigers	51	5	150	7	327
2024(loan)	→ Hull Kingston Rovers	2	0	7	0	14
2025	Hull Kingston Rovers	4	0	12	0	24
2025 (loan)	→ Huddersfield Giants	1	0	2	0	4
2025(loan)	→ Salford Red Devils	2	0	0	0	0
2025(loan)	→ York Knights	0	0	0	0	0
2026	York Knights	3	0	12	1	25
2026(loan)	→ Widnes Vikings	13	7	64	0	156
2027–	Widnes Vikings	0	0	0	0	0
	Total	142	23	438	17	985
Representative
Years	Team	Pld	T	G	FG	P
2019	England Knights	1	0	5	0	10
- Source: As of 6 November 2026

Danny Richardson (born 2 September 1996) is an English professional rugby league footballer who plays as a scrum-half or stand-off for Widnes Vikings in the RFL Championship. He has also played for the England Knights at international level.

He has previously played for St Helens, Castleford Tigers and Hull Kingston Rovers in the Super League. He has spent time on loan or dual registration at Sheffield Eagles, Leigh Centurions, and York in the Championship, and at Hull KR, Huddersfield Giants, and Salford Red Devils in the Super League.

== Background ==
Richardson was born in Widnes, Cheshire, England.

Richardson played junior rugby league for Widnes Moorfield and Halton Farnworth Hornets. He initially signed for the Widnes Vikings academy system, before joining the St Helens scholarship side aged 16.

On 25 September 2016, Richardson was named Man of the Match for his performance in the Academy Grand Final victory against Wigan.

== Career ==
=== St Helens ===
On 9 February 2017, Richardson made his Super League début for St Helens against the Leeds Rhinos. In October 2017, he signed a new three-year deal at St Helens, with the option of a further year.

Richardson was ever-present for the Saints in 2018, making 34 appearances and scoring 6 tries, 147 goals and 7 drop goals. His outstanding personal season saw him named in the 2018 Super League Dream Team.

==== Sheffield Eagles (dual registration) ====
In July 2017, having featured just four times in his first season at professional level, Richardson played for Championship outfit Sheffield Eagles through their new dual registration deal with St Helens. In his only appearance, he scored a try and converted seven goals.

==== Leigh Centurions (dual registration) ====
Richardson made 6 appearances for the Leigh Centurions in the Championship at the beginning of the 2019 season, kicking 9 goals.

=== Castleford Tigers ===
In October 2019, the Castleford Tigers announced the signing of Richardson on a three-year deal. He was acquired following the departure of Luke Gale, and would partner Jake Trueman in the halves. Head coach Daryl Powell said, "He has a sharp rugby mind alongside his ability to kick the ball in a special way both for goal and tactically."

Richardson made his Castleford debut on 2 February 2020 against the Toronto Wolfpack, converting four goals. He scored his first try for the Tigers against Hull Kingston Rovers on 27 February, for an individual haul of 16 points. Richardson made a total of 16 appearances throughout the COVID-disrupted season, scoring 2 tries, 54 goals and 1 drop goal.

In June 2021, Richardson was made available to Super League clubs for transfer, having been omitted from Castleford's squad for the Challenge Cup semi-final.

Richardson suffered a neck fracture in round 1 of the 2022 season, ruling him out until June. In round 19, Richardson scored a try, kicked five goals and one drop goal in Castleford's 35–22 victory over the Warrington Wolves. On 9 August 2022, Richardson signed a two-year contract extension to remain at Castleford until the end of the 2024 season. Weeks later, however, he sustained a torn ACL and MCL against the Salford Red Devils. This serious injury caused him to miss the remainder of 2022, as well as the entire 2023 season.

After 18 months on the sidelines, Richardson returned to training for 2024 pre-season. He made his competitive return in round 1 against the Wigan Warriors, kicking two penalty goals. In May, having lost his place in the starting lineup to Rowan Milnes, Richardson was allowed to depart on loan.

==== Hull Kingston Rovers (loan) ====
On 9 May 2024, Super League club Hull Kingston Rovers announced that they had signed Richardson on a season-long loan deal.

=== Hull Kingston Rovers ===
On 23 August 2024, Richardson signed for Hull Kingston Rovers on a permanent basis, joining on a two-year deal from the 2025 season.

==== Huddersfield Giants (loan) ====
On 6 February 2025, Richardson joined Huddersfield Giants on an initial two-week loan. On 20 February, he was recalled early by Hull KR, having played just one game for the Giants.

==== Salford Red Devils (loan) ====
On 24 June 2025, Richardson signed for Salford Red Devils in the Super League on a two-week loan.

==== York Knights (loan) ====
On 8 August 2025, Richardson joined York Knights in the RFL Championship on loan until the end of the season.

=== York Knights ===
On 21 October 2025, York announced the signing of Richardson on a permanent basis, agreeing a one-year deal for 2026.

==== Widnes Vikings (loan) ====
On 11 June 2026, it was reported that Richardson had signed for hometown club Widnes Vikings on loan until the end of the 2026 season.

He made his debut on 21 June 2026, scoring 8 goals, in the 0-48 win over Hunslet RLFC.

On 12 July 2026 he broke a Widnes club record scoring 48 points (3T, 18G) in the 6-116 win over North Wales Crusaders

== International career ==
In July 2018 he was selected in the England Knights Performance squad.

In 2019 he was selected for the England Knights against Jamaica at Headingley Rugby Stadium.

== Club statistics ==
Appearances and points in all competitions by year
Club	Season	Tier	App	T	G	DG	Pts
St Helens	2017	Super League	13	2	0	2	10
St Helens	2018	Super League	34	6	147	7	325
St Helens	2019	Super League	12	2	28	0	64
St Helens	Total		59	10	175	9	399
→ Sheffield Eagles (DR)	2017	Championship	1	1	7	0	18
→ Leigh Centurions (DR)	2019	Championship	6	0	9	0	18
Castleford Tigers	2020	Super League	16	2	54	1	117
Castleford Tigers	2021	Super League	18	1	52	3	111
Castleford Tigers	2022	Super League	12	2	33	3	77
Castleford Tigers	2023	Super League	0	0	0	0	0
Castleford Tigers	2024	Super League	5	0	11	0	22
Castleford Tigers	Total		51	5	150	7	327
Hull Kingston Rovers	2024 (Note: On loan from Castleford in 2024 before joining permanently in 2025)	Super League	2	0	7	0	14
Hull Kingston Rovers	2025	Super League	4	0	12	0	24
Hull Kingston Rovers	Total		6	0	19	0	38
→ Huddersfield Giants (loan)	2025	Super League	1	0	2	0	4
→ Salford Red Devils (loan)	2025	Super League	2	0	0	0	0
York Knights	2024 (Note: On loan from Hull KR in 2025 before joining permanently in 2026)	Championship	0	0	0	0	0
York Knights	2026	Super League	3	0	12	1	25
York Knights	Total		3	0	12	1	25
→ Widnes Vikings (loan)	2026	RFL Championship	13	7	64	0	156
Widnes Vikings	2027	RFL Championship	0	0	0	0	0
Career total			142	23	438	17	985

As of match played 12 June 2026
