= Derrell Olpherts =

English professional rugby league footballer

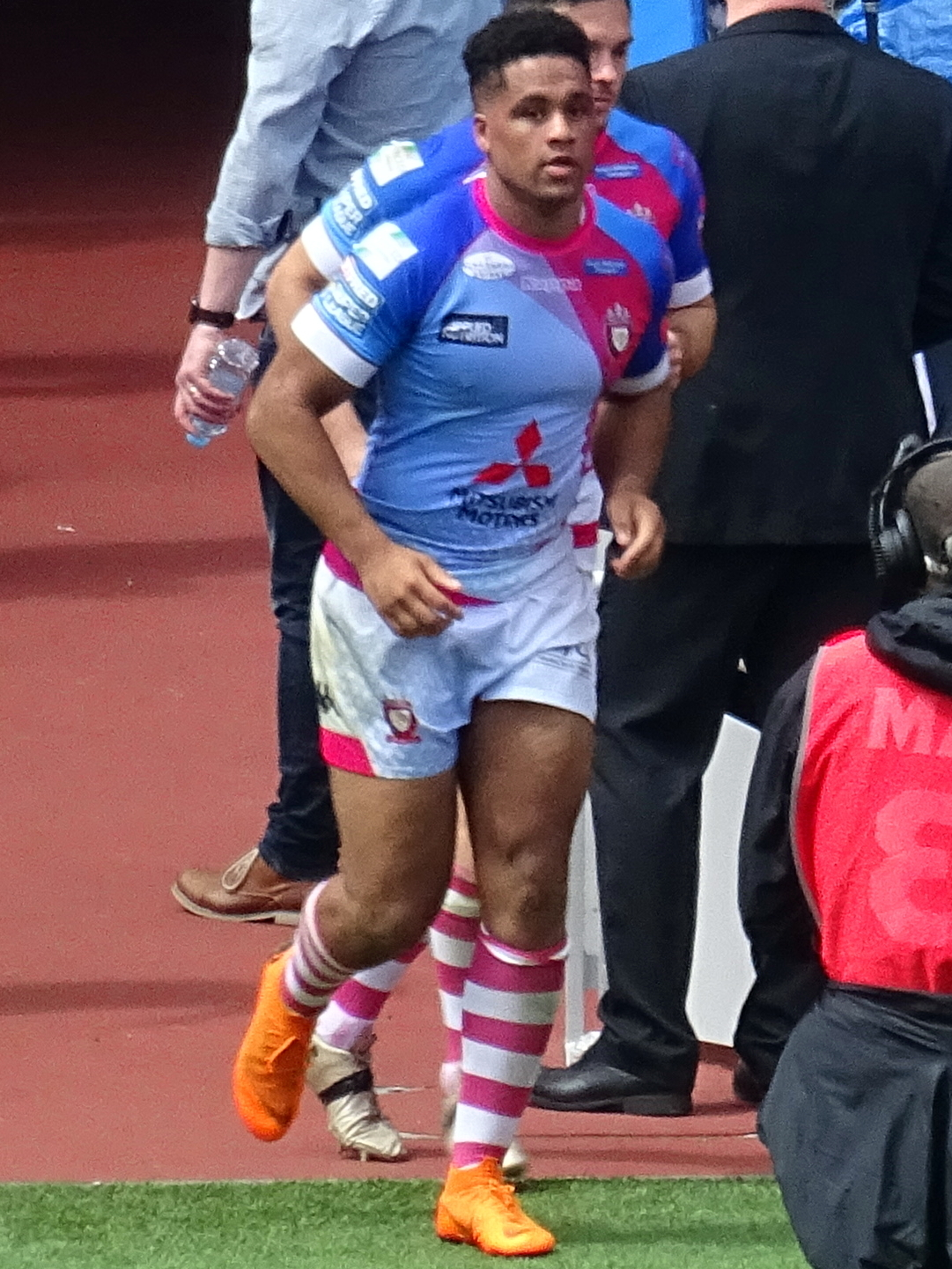

Personal information
- Born: 7 January 1992 (age 34) Wakefield, West Yorkshire, England
- Height: 6 ft 2 in (1.88 m)
- Weight: 15 st 6 lb (98 kg)

Playing information
- Position: Wing, Fullback, Centre
Club
Years	Team	Pld	T	G	FG	P
2012	Dewsbury Rams	4	1	0	0	4
2015	Hemel Stags	22	7	0	0	28
2016–17	Newcastle Thunder	41	30	0	0	120
2018–19	Salford Red Devils	42	16	0	0	64
2020–22	Castleford Tigers	65	36	0	0	144
2023–24	Leeds Rhinos	14	4	0	0	16
2024	Wakefield Trinity	28	27	0	0	108
2025	Featherstone Rovers	20	24	0	0	96
2026–	Batley Bulldogs	9	7	0	0	28
	Total	245	152	0	0	608
- Source: As of 13 October 2026

Derrell Olpherts (born 7 January 1992) is an English professional rugby league footballer who plays as a winger, fullback or centre for the Batley Bulldogs in the RFL Championship.

He has previously played for the Salford Red Devils, the Castleford Tigers and the Leeds Rhinos in the Super League, the Dewsbury Rams in the Championship, and the Hemel Stags and Newcastle Thunder in League 1.

== Background ==
Olpherts was born in Wakefield, West Yorkshire, England.

== Career ==
=== Dewsbury Rams ===
Olpherts made his professional début on 19 February 2012 for Dewsbury in a cup tie against Featherstone.

=== Hemel Stags ===
Olpherts played for the Hemel Stags in the Kingstone Press League 1 in 2015, making 22 appearances and scoring 7 tries as a fullback.

=== Newcastle Thunder ===
Olpherts represented the Newcastle Thunder in League 1 between 2016 and 2017. He was utilised as a centre or fullback and scored 30 tries in 41 appearances.

=== Salford Red Devils ===
Olpherts joined the Salford Red Devils for the 2018 season. He made his Super League début for Salford against Widnes.

=== Castleford Tigers ===
In July 2019, Olpherts signed a three-year contract with Castleford Tigers to start from the 2020 season. Head coach Daryl Powell said of him: "Derrell has been a standout winger in Super League this season. His ability to break tackles and make the game quick is outstanding."

Olpherts made his Castleford début on 2 February 2020 against the Toronto Wolfpack. He scored his first try for the club on 7 February against Wigan. He finished the 2020 season as Castleford's joint-highest tryscorer alongside Greg Eden.

On 17 July 2021, Olpherts played for Castleford in their 2021 Challenge Cup Final loss against St Helens.

In round 20 of the 2022 Super League season, Olpherts scored four tries and was named Man of the Match against Hull FC, marking his first hat-trick for Castleford.

On 26 August 2022, Castleford confirmed that Olpherts would leave the club at the end of the season upon the expiry of his contract.

=== Leeds Rhinos ===
On 20 October 2022, Olpherts signed a two-year contract with the Leeds Rhinos to start from the 2023 season. Olpherts played 13 games for Leeds in the 2023 Super League season as the club finished 8th on the table and missed the playoffs.

=== Wakefield Trinity ===
On 12 March 2024, it was reported that he had signed for Wakefield Trinity in the RFL Championship. In his first season at the club, he scored 27 tries in 28 matches. Wakefield would win three trophies in 2024, the 1895 cup, the league leaders shield and the RFL Championship defeating Toulouse Olympique in the grand final.

=== Featherstone Rovers ===
On 16 November 2024, it was reported that he had signed for Featherstone in the RFL Championship on a one-year deal.

=== Batley Bulldogs ===
On 3 February 2026, it was reported that he had signed for Batley Bulldogs in the RFL Championship until the end of the 2026 season.

== Statistics ==
Appearances and points in all competitions by year
Club	Season	Tier	App	T	G	DG	Pts
Dewsbury Rams	2012	Championship	4	1	0	0	4
Hemel Stags	2015	League 1	22	7	0	0	28
Newcastle Thunder	2016	League 1	17	13	0	0	52
Newcastle Thunder	2017	League 1	24	17	0	0	68
Newcastle Thunder	Total		41	30	0	0	120
Salford Red Devils	2018	Super League	19	7	0	0	28
Salford Red Devils	2019	Super League	23	9	0	0	36
Salford Red Devils	Total		42	16	0	0	64
Castleford Tigers	2020	Super League	15	8	0	0	32
Castleford Tigers	2021	Super League	24	10	0	0	40
Castleford Tigers	2022	Super League	26	18	0	0	72
Castleford Tigers	Total		65	36	0	0	144
Leeds Rhinos	2023	Super League	14	4	0	0	16
Wakefield Trinity	2024	Championship	19	18	0	0	72
Career total			207	112	0	0	448

As of match played 9 August 2024
