= Jake Trueman =

English professional rugby league footballer

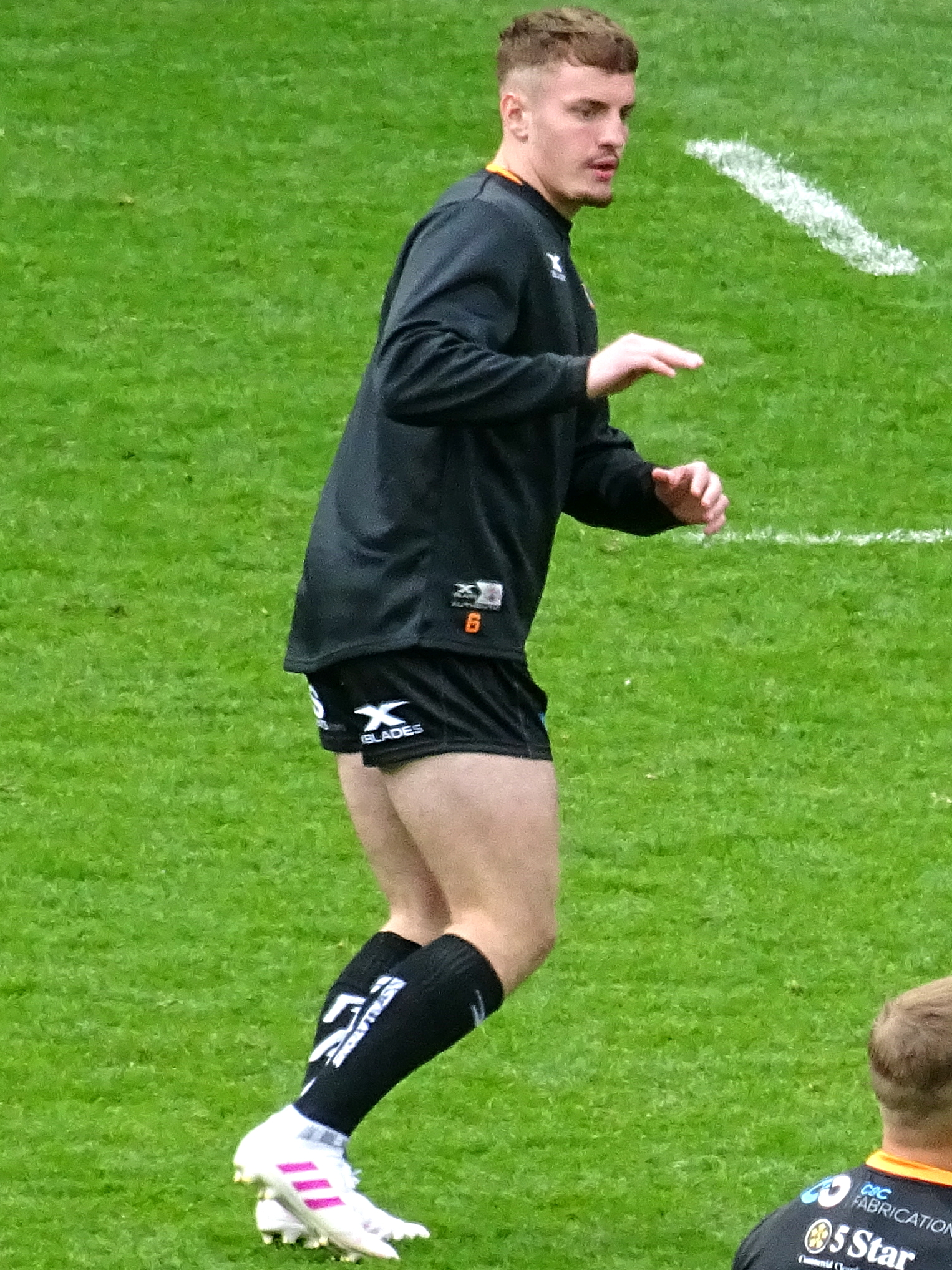

Personal information
- Full name: Jacob Trueman
- Born: 16 February 1999 (age 27) Bradford, West Yorkshire, England
- Height: 6 ft 0 in (1.83 m)
- Weight: 14 st 2 lb (90 kg)

Playing information
- Position: Stand-off, Scrum-half, Fullback
Club
| Years | Team | Pld | T | G | FG | P |
|---|---|---|---|---|---|---|
| 2016 | Bradford Bulls | 1 | 0 | 0 | 0 | 0 |
| 2017–22 | Castleford Tigers | 103 | 32 | 0 | 1 | 129 |
| 2023–24 | Hull FC | 26 | 5 | 0 | 0 | 20 |
| 2025– | Wakefield Trinity | 38 | 7 | 0 | 1 | 28 |
| | Total | 168 | 44 | 0 | 2 | 177 |
- Source: As of 30 March 2026

Jacob Trueman (born 16 February 1999) is an English professional rugby league footballer who plays as a stand-off or scrum-half for Wakefield Trinity in the Super League.

He has previously played for the Castleford Tigers and Hull FC in the Super League, and for the Bradford Bulls in the Championship. He has represented England at international level.

== Background ==
Trueman was born in Bradford, West Yorkshire, England. He began playing rugby league for local amateur side, West Bowling.

== Club career ==
=== Bradford Bulls ===
He is a product of the Bradford Bulls Academy and signed his first professional contract in January 2016 with them. He made his debut in May 2016 against the Swinton Lions.

=== Castleford Tigers ===
In January 2017, Trueman was signed by the Castleford Tigers, joining the club on a two-year deal. He made his Super League début on 4 June 2017 against St Helens. He scored a hat-trick in his second Castleford appearance against Wigan Warriors on 17 September. At the end of the season, Trueman was named as the Tigers Academy Players' Player of the Year. In December 2017, Trueman signed a new three-year contract with Castleford, with head coach Daryl Powell labelling him "the most promising half-back in the English game".

Trueman was assigned squad number 21 for 2018. He was utilised in the fullback position for a period, although he made the majority of his appearances at halfback. He performed consistently well throughout the season, cementing his place in the first team by appearing in all but 4 of Castleford's games. Trueman's contributions were reflected in the end-of-season awards, as he was named as Castleford's Young Player of the Year and 2nd place Player of the Year. He also went on to win the Super League Young Player Of The Year 2018. In November, he signed a new four-year contract with the Tigers until the end of 2022.

For the 2019 season, Trueman was given squad number 6, recognising his place in Castleford's first team. Injuries to teammates meant that he wasn't able to form a consistent partnership with any other halfback, starting alongside Jordan Rankin, Paul McShane, Peter Mata'utia, Cory Aston and Jamie Ellis at different points throughout the season. He scored his second hat-trick for Castleford against Hull F.C. on 5 September, to help the Tigers reach the play-offs. He made 31 appearances, missing only 1 game for the Tigers, and scored 8 tries. He finished as a runner-up for Castleford's Player of the Year and Players' Player of the Year awards and was once again nominated for Super League Young Player of the Year.

Trueman was named Man of the Match for his performance against the Toronto Wolfpack in the opening round of the 2020 season. His developing halfback combination with new Tigers signing Danny Richardson was widely lauded as an exciting and potentially long-term partnership for both club and country. Castleford captain Michael Shenton shared this view ("It's exciting. A lot of teams have gone for Australian halves but we've gone for young British halves with plenty of talent.") and spoke very highly of Trueman: "He is a quiet person off the field but on the field we are trying to make him grow because he's unequalled in talent for our team. He's our best player."

On 17 July 2021, he played for Castleford in their 2021 Challenge Cup Final loss against St. Helens.

=== Hull FC ===
On 5 July 2022, it was announced that Trueman would join Hull FC on a three-year deal from the 2023 season. Trueman made his club debut for Hull F.C. in round 11 of the 2023 Super League season against Wigan. Trueman was sent to the sin bin during the second half of the game for a professional foul. Trueman played 13 games for Hull F.C. for in the Super League XXVIII season as the club finished 10th on the table.

=== Wakefield Trinity ===
On 27 August 2024, it was reported that he had signed for Wakefield Trinity on a three-year deal.On 3 October 2026, Trueman played in the 2026 Super League Grand Final against Warrington, which Wakefield won 23-10.

== International career ==
In July 2018, he was selected in the England Knights Performance squad.

He was selected in England 9s squad for the 2019 Rugby League World Cup 9s.

He was selected in squad for the 2019 Great Britain Lions tour of the Southern Hemisphere.

== Club statistics ==
Appearances and points in all competitions by year
| Club | Season | Tier | App | T | G | DG | Pts |
|---|---|---|---|---|---|---|---|
| Bradford Bulls | 2016 | Super League | 1 | 0 | 0 | 0 | 0 |
| Castleford Tigers | 2017 | Super League | 3 | 3 | 0 | 0 | 12 |
| Castleford Tigers | 2018 | Super League | 28 | 8 | 0 | 0 | 32 |
| Castleford Tigers | 2019 | Super League | 31 | 8 | 0 | 1 | 33 |
| Castleford Tigers | 2020 | Super League | 11 | 1 | 0 | 0 | 4 |
| Castleford Tigers | 2021 | Super League | 11 | 5 | 0 | 0 | 20 |
| Castleford Tigers | 2022 | Super League | 19 | 7 | 0 | 0 | 28 |
| Castleford Tigers | Total | | 103 | 32 | 0 | 1 | 129 |
| Hull FC | 2023 | Super League | 15 | 3 | 0 | 0 | 12 |
| Hull FC | 2024 | Super League | 11 | 2 | 0 | 0 | 8 |
| Hull FC | Total | | 26 | 5 | 0 | 0 | 20 |
| Wakefield Trinity | 2025 | Super League | 0 | 0 | 0 | 0 | 0 |
| Career total | | | 130 | 37 | 0 | 1 | 149 |

As of match played 3 August 2024
