= Junior Moors =

Samoa international rugby league footballer

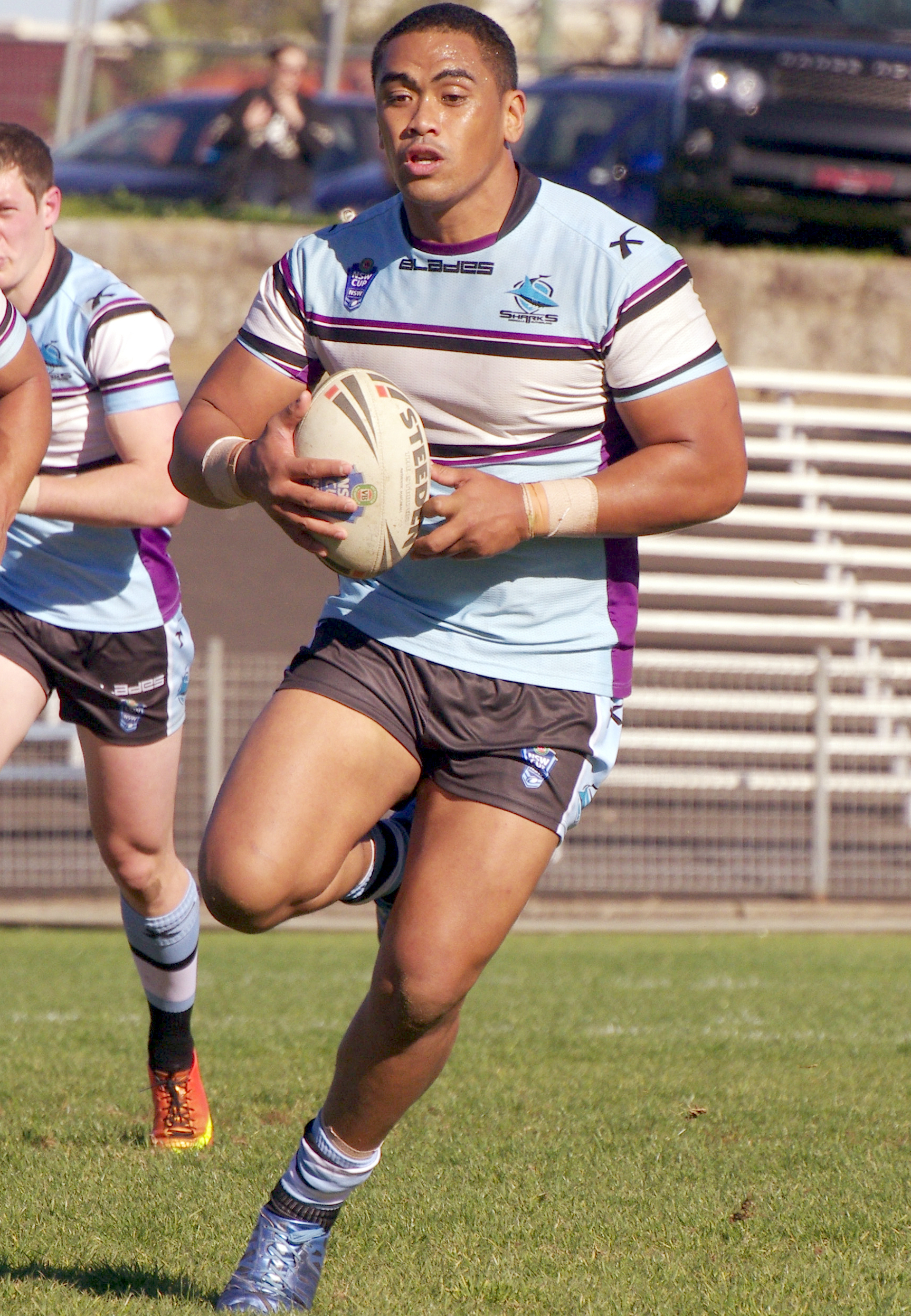

Personal information
- Born: 30 July 1986 (age 40) Auckland, New Zealand
- Height: 190 cm (6 ft 3 in)
- Weight: 117 kg (18 st 6 lb)

Playing information
- Position: Second-row, Lock, Prop
Club
Years	Team	Pld	T	G	FG	P
2007–09	Penrith Panthers	24	1	0	0	4
2010–12	Wests Tigers	25	0	0	0	0
2013–14	Melbourne Storm	21	0	0	0	0
2015–20	Castleford Tigers	114	18	0	0	72
2021–23	Featherstone Rovers	62	10	0	0	40
	Total	246	29	0	0	116
Representative
Years	Team	Pld	T	G	FG	P
2013	Samoa	3	1	0	0	4
- Source: As of 8 November 2023

Junior Moors (born 30 July 1986) is a Samoa international rugby league footballer who plays as a prop, second-row, loose forward for Campbelltown City Kangaroos in the Group 6 Rugby League.

He previously played for the Penrith Panthers, Wests Tigers and the Melbourne Storm in the NRL, as well as Castleford Tigers in the Betfred Super League.

== Background ==
Moors was born in Auckland, New Zealand, and moved to Australia and was educated at Patrician Brothers' College, Blacktown.

Moors played his junior football for Cambridge Park RLFC before being signed by the Penrith Panthers. He played for the Panthers' Premier League reserve-grade team in 2006.

== Club career ==
=== Penrith Panthers ===
In Round 1 of the 2007 NRL season he made his NRL debut for the Panthers against the Cronulla-Sutherland Sharks.

In a 2009 pre-season trial, Moors suffered a broken ankle which stopped him from playing first-grade that season.

=== Wests Tigers ===
In September 2009, Moors signed a one-year contract with the Wests Tigers starting in 2010, with the Tigers having an option to extend his contract for a further season.

Moors became a regular interchange player in the second half of 2012, making 14 appearances for the year. He said, "It’s something I have struggled with over the last couple of years, keeping my weight down but it’s been good this year. I’m starting to feel more comfortable in the team now." Statistically, Moors was revealed to be one of the most effective tacklers in the NRL in 2012, with a 94.1% success rate in tackles. He was also a member of the Balmain Ryde Eastwood Tigers side that lost the NSW Cup grand final.

=== Melbourne Storm ===
On 13 September 2012, Moors signed a one-year contract with Melbourne Storm starting in 2013.

His first game was interchange for Storm's 2013 World Club Challenge win over Leeds.

=== Castleford Tigers ===
On 11 June 2014, it was confirmed that Moors had signed a three-year contract to play for the Super League club the Castleford Tigers (Heritage No. 953) from 2015. Castleford head coach Daryl Powell said of the signing: "I think his style is going to be really well-suited to the Super League and he'll be a real threat."

Moors was given squad number 16 ahead of his first season with the Tigers. Moors made his Super League début against the Wakefield Trinity Wildcats in the first round, on 8 February 2015. He scored his first try for the club against the Warrington Wolves in round 23, on 26 July. He finished the year having made 25 appearances and scored 4 tries.

For 2016, Moors was assigned shirt number 17. He suffered a broken hand in March, missing 8 games, although returned earlier than expected - Daryl Powell described his post-injury form as "outstanding", and called him "a tough character". His "irrepressible" performance in Castleford's 52–12 victory over West Yorkshire rivals Leeds Rhinos saw him voted as the Fans' Man of the Match. His outstanding personal year saw him dominate the club's end-of-season awards, being recognised as the Fans' Player of the Year, Players' Player of the Year, and 1st Place Player of the Year. In October, he signed a two-year contract extension with the Tigers until the end of 2019. "He had an enormous 2016, being one of the best forwards in Super League," said Daryl Powell.

Moors was utilised as an impact player for the 2017 season, making the vast majority of his appearances as an interchange. In June, he sustained a knee ligament injury which kept him out for 8 games. He continued his impressive performances, and greatly contributed towards the Tigers 1st-placed finish in Super League. Resultantly, in August he signed a further one-year contract extension, keeping him at Castleford until the end of 2020. Daryl Powell said, "Junior Moors is a high-quality player who has continued to get better during his time at the club." He played in the 2017 Super League Grand Final defeat by the Leeds Rhinos at Old Trafford.

Following the retirement of Andy Lynch, Moors was given squad number 8 for 2018. This, however, didn't reflect any change in his role on the pitch, as he remained a key impact substitute. He largely avoided any long-term injuries and made 25 appearances this year. He also scored 8 tries, including his first brace against the Huddersfield Giants on 13 September - this made the 2018 season his highest-scoring campaign yet.

Moors' 2019 season was severely limited by serious injuries - he sustained a knee injury in April, keeping him out for 2 months, before suffering a season-ending hip fracture in just his second game back. He made 13 appearances and scored 3 tries.

In November 2020, Castleford coach Daryl Powell confirmed the departure of Moors.

=== Featherstone Rovers ===
On 20 January 2021, it was reported that he had signed for Featherstone in the RFL Championship On 28 May 2022, Moors played for Featherstone in their 2022 RFL 1895 Cup final loss against Leigh. On 8 November 2023, Moors announced his retirement from professional rugby league

== International career ==
While attending Patrician Brothers' College Blacktown, Moors played for the Australian Schoolboys team in 2004.

In 2013, Junior was selected for the Samoa national rugby league team in the 2013 Rugby League World Cup. He played in 3 of the Samoans 4 tournament games, scoring one try against the French in the group stage.

== Statistics ==
Season	Team	App	T	G	FG	Pts
2007	Penrith Panthers	15	1	0	0	4
2008	Penrith Panthers	9	0	0	0	0
2010	Wests Tigers	11	0	0	0	0
2012	Wests Tigers	14	0	0	0	0
2013	Melbourne Storm	11	0	0	0	0
2014	Melbourne Storm	10	0	0	0	0
2015	Castleford Tigers	25	4	0	0	16
2016	Castleford Tigers	22	1	0	0	4
2017	Castleford Tigers	23	2	0	0	8
2018	Castleford Tigers	25	8	0	0	32
2019	Castleford Tigers	13	3	0	0	12
2020	Castleford Tigers	6	0	0	0	0
2021	Featherstone	17	3			12
2022	Featherstone	31	5			20
2023	Featherstone	14	2			8
Totals		246	29	0	0	116
