= 2021 Super League season results =

2021 British rugby league results

Super League XXVI was the 2021 season of Super League, and 126th season of rugby league in Great Britain. The season started on 26 March 2021, with all six fixtures taking place behind closed doors, at Headingley. It was originally scheduled to have consisted of 27 regular season games, but changes introduced during the season shortened the competition to 25 rounds and subsequent play-offs. The season finale, the Grand Final, took place at Old Trafford, on 9 October 2021.

Due to the ongoing effects of the Covid-19 pandemic, the Magic Weekend, which was cancelled in 2020, took place over the weekend of 4–5 September 2021 at St James' Park, Newcastle.

The full fixture list was released on 26 February 2021, with defending champions St Helens, starting their title defence against Last Year's Challenge Cup finalists Salford Red Devils (a repeat of the 2019 Super League Grand Final), whilst last season's runners up, Wigan Warriors played newly promoted Leigh Centurions.

== Regular season ==
=== Round 1 ===
Home	Score	Away	Match information
Home	Score	Away	Date and time (GMT)	Venue	Referee	Attendance
St Helens	29–6	Salford Red Devils	26 March 2021, 18:00	Emerald Headingley	Liam Moore	— (Note: played behind closed doors, due to the COVID-19 pandemic)
Leigh Centurions	18–20	Wigan Warriors	26 March 2021, 20:15	Emerald Headingley	Ben Thaler	—
Wakefield Trinity	22–28	Leeds Rhinos (Note: Although the match being played at Headingley, this fixture was an away game for Leeds.)	27 March 2021, 15:00	Emerald Headingley	Scott Mikalauskus	—
Catalans Dragons	29–28 (Note: After golden-point extra time)	Hull KR	27 March 2021, 17:15	Emerald Headingley	James Child	—
Hull FC	22–10	Huddersfield Giants	28 March 2021, 12:30	Emerald Headingley	Robert Hicks	—
Castleford Tigers	21–12	Warrington Wolves	28 March 2021, 14:45	Emerald Headingley	Chris Kendall	—

=== Round 2 (Mose Masoe Round) ===
Home	Score	Away	Match information
Home	Score	Away	Date and time (BST)	Venue	Referee	Attendance
Wigan Warriors	34–6	Wakefield Trinity	1 April 2021, 18:00	Totally Wicked Stadium	Scott Mikalauskas	— (Note: played behind closed doors, due to the COVID-19 pandemic)
Hull KR	0–25	St Helens (Note: Although St Helens were playing on their home ground, the match was officially an away fixture for St Helens.)	1 April 2021, 20:15	Totally Wicked Stadium	Robert Hicks	—
Warrington Wolves	44–12	Leigh Centurions	2 April 2021, 12:45	Totally Wicked Stadium	James Child	—
Leeds Rhinos	10–18	Castleford Tigers	2 April 2021, 15:00	Totally Wicked Stadium	Liam Moore	—
Salford Red Devils	4–35	Hull FC	3 April 2021, 12:45	Totally Wicked Stadium	Chris Kendall	—
Huddersfield Giants	10–20	Catalans Dragons	3 April 2021, 15:00	Totally Wicked Stadium	Ben Thaler	—

=== Round 3 ===
Home	Score	Away	Match information
Home	Score	Away	Date and time (BST)	Venue	Referee	Attendance
Leeds Rhinos	6–19	Wigan Warriors	15 April 2021, 19:45	Emerald Headingley	Chris Kendall	— (Note: Played behind closed doors, due to the COVID-19 pandemic)
Castleford Tigers	52–16	Leigh Centurions	16 April 2021, 18:00	Mend-A-Hose Jungle	Marcus Griffiths	—
St Helens	34–6	Wakefield Trinity	16 April 2021, 18:00	Totally Wicked Stadium	James Child	—
Hull KR	25–24	Huddersfield Giants	16 April 2021, 19:45	KCOM Craven Park	Liam Moore	—
Catalans Dragons	42–6	Salford Red Devils	17 April 2021, 16:45	Stade Gilbert Brutus	Ben Thaler	—
Hull FC	14–14 (Note: After golden point extra time)	Warrington Wolves	18 April 2021, 15:00	KCOM Stadium	Robert Hicks	—

=== Round 4 ===
Home	Score	Away	Match information
Home	Score	Away	Date and time (BST)	Venue	Referee	Attendance
Wigan Warriors	22–12	Castleford Tigers	22 April 2021, 18:00	DW Stadium	Chris Kendall	— (Note: played behind closed doors, due to the COVID-19 pandemic)
Huddersfield Giants	10–18	St Helens	22 April 2021, 19:45	John Smiths Stadium	Robert Hicks	—
Hull KR	26–6	Leeds Rhinos	23 April 2021, 18:00	KCOM Craven Park	Marcus Griffiths	—
Salford Red Devils	34–8	Leigh Centurions	23 April 2021, 18:00	AJ Bell Stadium	James Child	—
Hull FC	20–14	Wakefield Trinity	23 April 2021, 19:45	KCOM Stadium	Ben Thaler	—
Catalans Dragons	8–24	Warrington Wolves	24 April 2021, 17:00	Stade Gilbert Brutus	Liam Moore	—

=== Round 5 ===
Home	Score	Away	Match information
Home	Score	Away	Date and time (BST)	Venue	Referee	Attendance
Wigan Warriors	16–14	Hull FC	29 April 2021, 19:45	DW Stadium	James Child	— (Note: played behind closed doors, due to the COVID-19 pandemic)
Leigh Centurions	12–22	St Helens	30 April 2021, 18:00	Leigh Sports Village	Marcus Griffiths	—
Wakefield Trinity	18–38	Catalans Dragons	30 April 2021, 18:00	Mobile Rocket Stadium	Chris Kendall	—
Salford Red Devils	18–28	Castleford Tigers	30 April 2021, 19:45	AJ Bell Stadium	Robert Hicks	—
Warrington Wolves	50–26	Hull KR	1 May 2021, 13:00	Halliwell Jones Stadium	Scott Mikalauskas	—
Huddersfield Giants	14–13	Leeds Rhinos	2 May 2021, 15:00	John Smiths Stadium	Liam Moore	—

=== Round 6 ===
Home	Score	Away	Match information
Home	Score	Away	Date and time (BST)	Venue	Referee	Attendance (Note: Attendances reduced to limited crowds, due to COVID-19 regulations)
Leeds Rhinos	15–13 (Note: After golden point extra time)	Wakefield Trinity	14 May 2021, 19:45	Emerald Headingley	Robert Hicks	— (Note: played behind closed doors, due to the COVID-19 pandemic)
Castleford Tigers	22–26	Hull KR	17 May 2021, 19:45	Mend-A-Hose Jungle	Marcus Griffiths	3,600
Hull FC	10–27	Catalans Dragons	17 May 2021, 19:45	KCOM Stadium	Chris Kendall	5,527
Leigh Centurions	16–30	Wigan Warriors	17 May 2021, 19:45	Leigh Sports Village	Ben Thaler	1,700
St Helens	28–0	Salford Red Devils	17 May 2021, 19:45	Totally Wicked Stadium	Liam Moore	4,000
Warrington Wolves	20–26	Huddersfield Giants	17 May 2021, 19:45	Halliwell Jones Stadium	James Child	4,000

=== Round 7 ===
Home	Score	Away	Match information
Home	Score	Away	Date and time (BST)	Venue	Referee	Attendance (Note: Attendances reduced to limited crowds, due to COVID-19 regulations)
Salford Red Devils	16–17	Wigan Warriors	22 May 2021, 13:00	AJ Bell Stadium	James Child	4,000
Warrington Wolves	38–14	Castleford Tigers	22 May 2021, 15:00	Halliwell Jones Stadium	Chris Kendall	4,000
Catalans Dragons	20–16	St Helens	22 May 2021, 17:00	Stade Gilbert Brutus	Robert Hicks	1,000
Leigh Centurions	6–44	Huddersfield Giants	23 May 2021, 15:00	Leigh Sports Village	Scott Mikalauskas	2,008
Wakefield Trinity	28–12	Hull KR	23 May 2021, 15:00	Mobile Rocket Stadium	Liam Moore	4,000
Leeds Rhinos	12–18	Hull FC	23 May 2021, 19:30	Emerald Headingley	Marcus Griffiths	4,000

=== Round 8 ===
Home	Score	Away	Match information
Home	Score	Away	Date and time (BST)	Venue	Referee	Attendance (Note: Attendances reduced to limited crowds, due to COVID-19 regulations)
Salford Red Devils	18–62	Warrington Wolves	27 May 2021, 19:45	AJ Bell Stadium	Scott Mikalauskas	4,000
Castleford Tigers	6–60	Leeds Rhinos	28 May 2021, 19:45	Mend-A-Hose Jungle	Liam Moore	4,000
St Helens	34–16	Hull FC	28 May 2021, 19:45	Totally Wicked Stadium	Chris Kendall	4,000
Catalans Dragons	48–0	Wigan Warriors	29 May 2021, 17:00	Stade Gilbert Brutus	James Child	1,000
Hull KR	40–16	Leigh Centurions	30 May 2021, 15:00	KCOM Craven Park	Marcus Griffiths	4,000
Wakefield Trinity	38–12	Huddersfield Giants	30 May 2021, 15:00	Mobile Rocket Stadium	Robert Hicks	4,000

=== Round 9 (Rainbow Laces round) ===
The matches in round 9 were played while giving support to the Rainbow Laces campaign run by Stonewall.

Home	Score	Away	Match information
Home	Score	Away	Date and time (BST)	Venue	Referee	Attendance
Castleford Tigers	12–30	Hull FC	10 June 2021, 19:45	Mend-A-Hose Jungle	Robert Hicks	4,000
Hull KR	40–4	Salford Red Devils	11 June 2021, 19:45	KCOM Craven Park	Chris Kendall	4,000
Warrington Wolves	38–18	Wakefield Trinity	11 June 2021, 19:45	Halliwell Jones Stadium	Marcus Griffiths	4,000
Leigh Centurions	30–36	Catalans Dragons	12 June 2021, 15:00	Leigh Sports Village	Tom Grant	1,840
Huddersfield Giants	12–14	Wigan Warriors	16 July 2021, 19:45 (Note: Original Match postponed on 8 June, under the RFL's COVID-19 protocols, after seven Huddersfield players tested positive for COVID-19.)	John Smith's Stadium	Scott Mikalauskas	2,139
Leeds Rhinos	C–C	St Helens	— (Note: this match will no longer be rescheduled/played, due to the table being decided by win percentage, rather than points to allow for the possibility of clubs failing to complete the season.)

=== Round 10 ===
Home	Score	Away	Match information
Home	Score	Away	Date and time (BST)	Venue	Referee	Attendance
Wakefield Trinity	12–18	Castleford Tigers	16 June 2021, 19:45	Mobile Rocket Stadium	Liam Moore	2,262
St Helens	2–6	Warrington Wolves	17 June 2021, 19:45	Totally Wicked Stadium	Chris Kendall	4,000
Huddersfield Giants	8–9	Salford Red Devils	18 June 2021, 19:45	John Smith's Stadium	Scott Mikalauskas	2,352
Wigan Warriors	8–18	Hull KR	18 June 2021, 19:45	DW Stadium	Robert Hicks	5,018
Leigh Centurions	22–64	Hull FC	19 June 2021, 15:00	Leigh Sports Village	James Child	2,238
Catalans Dragons	27–18	Leeds Rhinos	16 July 2021, 18:15 (Note: Original match postponed on 15 June, due to at least eight Leeds players testing positive, and several others ordered to self-isolate.)	Stade Gilbert Brutus	Ben Thaler	4,800

=== Round 11 ===
Home	Score	Away	Match information
Home	Score	Away	Date and time (BST)	Venue	Referee	Attendance (Note: Attendances limited by COVID-19 regulations)
Castleford Tigers	6–16	Catalans Dragons	24 June 2021, 19:45	Mend-A-Hose Jungle	Chris Kendall	4,000
Wakefield Trinity	14–6	Wigan Warriors	24 June 2021, 19:45	Mobile Rocket Stadium	Tom Grant	2,262
Warrington Wolves	44–18	Leigh Centurions	24 June 2021, 19:45	Halliwell Jones Stadium	Jack Smith	4,000
Hull FC	17–10	Huddersfield Giants	25 June 2021 TBC	KCOM Stadium	Liam Moore	5,527
Salford Red Devils	12–38	Leeds Rhinos	27 June 2021, 13:00 (Note: Moved from 25 June after Leeds exercised the right to move fixture when four or more players are on international duties.)	AJ Bell Stadium	Robert Hicks	2,219
Hull KR	C–C	St Helens	— (Note: this match will no longer be rescheduled/played, due to the table being decided by win percentage, rather than points to allow for the possibility of clubs failing to complete the season.)

=== Round 12 ===
Home	Score	Away	Match information
Home	Score	Away	Date and time (BST)	Venue	Referee	Attendance
Castleford Tigers	0–24 (Note: Match forfeited by Castleford as the club were unable to raise a team and the circumstances did not meet the requirements for a postponement under the RFL COVID-19 protocols.)	St Helens	—
Wigan Warriors	14–40	Warrington Wolves	30 June 2021, 19:45	DW Stadium	Robert Hicks	5,537
Huddersfield Giants	12–50	Catalans Dragons	1 July 2021, 19:45	John Smith's Stadium	Ben Thaler	4,000
Leeds Rhinos	48–18	Leigh Centurions	1 July 2021, 19:45	Emerald Headingley	Aaron Moore	4,000
Hull KR	C–C	Hull FC	— (Note: this match will no longer be rescheduled/played, due to the table being decided by win percentage, rather than points, to allow for the possibility of clubs failing to complete the season.)
Salford Red Devils	24–14	Wakefield Trinity	16 July 2021, 19:30 (Note: Match postponed under RFL COVID-19 protocols after 10 members of Salford's senior squad and staff either tested positive or were required to self-isolate.)	Halliwell Jones Stadium (Note: Salford's home ground unavailable due to pitch maintenance.)	Gareth Hewer	4,000

=== Round 13 ===
Home	Score	Away	Match information
Home	Score	Away	Date and time (BST)	Venue	Referee	Attendance
Wakefield Trinity	30–20	Leigh Centurions	6 June 2021, 15:00	Mobile Rocket Stadium	Scott Mikalauskas
St Helens	24–6	Wigan Warriors	4 July 2021, 19:30	Totally Wicked Stadium	James Child	4,000
Warrington Wolves	16–22	Leeds Rhinos	5 July 2021, 19:45	Halliwell Jones Stadium	Liam Moore	4,000
Huddersfield Giants	0–24 (Note: Match forfeited by Huddersfield as the club were unable to raise a team and the circumstances did not meet the requirements for a postponement under the RFL COVID-19 protocols.)	Castleford Tigers	—
Catalans Dragons	32–30	Hull KR	24 July 2021, 17:00 (Note: Match originally scheduled for 5 July but postponed on 24 June under RFL COVID-19 protocols after Hull KR reported 13 players either having tested positive or required to self-isolate.)	Stade Gilbert Brutus	James Child	5,586
Hull FC	P–P	Salford Red Devils	TBC (Note: Match postponed under RFL COVID-19 protocols after 10 members of Salford's senior squad and staff either tested positive or were required to self-isolate.)	KCOM Stadium

=== Round 14 ===
Home	Score	Away	Match information
Home	Score	Away	Date and time (BST)	Venue	Referee	Attendance
Leeds Rhinos	18–26	Catalans Dragons	9 July 2021, 19:45	Emerald Headingley	James Child	4,000
Wakefield Trinity	14–30	St Helens	9 July 2021, 19:45	Mobile Rocket Stadium	Ben Thaler	4,000
Wigan Warriors	16–12	Huddersfield Giants	11 July 2021, 15:00	DW Stadium	Marcus Griffiths	4,439
Castleford Tigers	18–70	Salford Red Devils	11 July 2021, 15:30	Mend-A-Hose Jungle	Tom Grant	3,900
Hull FC	P–P	Leigh Centurions	TBC (Note: Match postponed on 10 July under RFL COVID-19 protocols, due to several Hull players having to self-isolate or having tested positive.)	KCOM Stadium
Hull KR	P–P	Warrington Wolves	TBC (Note: Match postponed on 10 July under RFL COVID-19 protocols, due to several Warrington players having tested positive or having to self-isolate.)	Hull College Community Stadium

=== Round 15 ===
Home	Score	Away	Match information
Home	Score	Away	Date and time (BST)	Venue	Referee	Attendance
Huddersfield Giants	40–26	Hull FC	22 July 2021, 19:45	John Smiths Stadium	Chris Kendall	3,699
Leeds Rhinos	38–16	Salford Red Devils	23 July 2021, 19:45	Emerald Headingley	Ben Thaler	10,515
Wigan Warriors	25–12	Wakefield Trinity	23 July 2021, 19:45	DW Stadium	Tom Grant	5,555
Catalans Dragons	P–P	Castleford Tigers	TBC (Note: Catalans were originally scheduled to play Castleford on 24 July, but the match was postponed on 21 July, under RFL COVID-19 protocols, as Catleford had 7 or more players unavailable through positive tests and close contacts. As a result of St Helens' match with Hull KR also postponed, Catalans will now play Hull KR in the rearranged round 13 fixture.)	Stade Gilbert Brutus
Leigh Centurions	P–P	Warrington Wolves	TBC (Note: Match, originally scheduled for 22 July postponed on 19 July under RFL COVID-19 protocols as Warrington had nine players unavailable through positive tests and close contacts.)	Leigh Sports Village
St Helens	P–P	Hull KR	TBC (Note: Match originally scheduled for 23 July, postponed on 21 July under RFL COVID-19 protocols as St Helens had 7 or more players unavailable through positive tests and close contacts.)	Totally Wicked Stadium

=== Round 16 ===
Home	Score	Away	Match information
Home	Score	Away	Date and time (BST)	Venue	Referee	Attendance
Warrington Wolves	21–8	Wigan Warriors	28 July 2021, 19:45	Halliwell Jones Stadium	Robert Hicks	8,014
Catalans Dragons	40–20	Wakefield Trinity	29 July 2021, 18:45	Stade Gilbert Brutus	Marcus Griffiths	6,267
Hull FC	12–22	Leeds Rhinos	29 July 2021, 19:45	MKM Stadium	Liam Moore	9,356
Leigh Centurions	P–P	Castleford Tigers	TBC (Note: match postponed under RFL COVID-19 protocols with more than seven Castleford players testing positive or required to self-isolate.)	Leigh Sports Village
Salford Red Devils	P–P	Hull KR	TBC (Note: on 27 July 2021, Salford announced that they had postponed their next two games against Hull KR and Wakefield, due to COVID-19 issues amongst the club.)	AJ Bell Stadium
St Helens	P–P	Huddersfield Giants	TBC (Note: match postponed under RFL COVID-19 protocols with more than seven St Helens players testing positive or required to self-isolate.)	Totally Wicked Stadium

=== Round 17 ===
Home	Score	Away	Match information
Home	Score	Away	Date and time (BST)	Venue	Referee	Attendance
Wigan Warriors	50–6	Leigh Centurions	1 August 2021, 15:00	DW Stadium	Scott Mikalauskas	9,206
Leeds Rhinos	26–27	Warrington Wolves	1 August 2021, 19:30	Emerald Headingley	Chris Kendall	9,196
Castleford Tigers	16–34	Huddersfield Giants	2 August 2021, 19:45	The Mend-A-Hose Jungle	Tom Grant	5,126
Hull FC	10–42	St Helens	2 August 2021, 19:45	KCOM Stadium	James Child	7,038
Hull KR	16–23	Catalans Dragons	2 August 2021, 19:45	Hull College Community Stadium	Robert Hicks	6,347
Salford Red Devils	P–P	Wakefield Trinity	TBC (Note: on 27 July 2021, Salford announced that they had postponed their next 2 games against Hull KR, and Wakefield, due to COVID-19 issues amongst the club.)	AJ Bell Stadium

=== Round 18 ===
Home	Score	Away	Match information
Home	Score	Away	Date and time (BST)	Venue	Referee	Attendance
Leeds Rhinos	18–32	Castleford Tigers	6 August 2021, 19:45	Emerald Headingley	Ben Thaler	10,838
Wigan Warriors	16–6	Salford Red Devils	6 August 2021, 19:45	DW Stadium	Tom Grant	9,434
St Helens	34–12	Catalans Dragons	7 August 2021, 14:30	Totally Wicked Stadium	Liam Moore	7,758
Huddersfield Giants	22–18	Wakefield Trinity	8 August 2021, 15:00	John Smiths Stadium	James Child	3,964
Warrington Wolves	P–P	Hull FC	TBC (Note: Match postponed under RFL COVID-19 protocols after Hull reported five players testing positive with several more required to self-isolate under track-and-trace.)	Halliwell Jones Stadium
Leigh Centurions	28–34	Hull KR	8 August 2021, 15:30	Leigh Sports Village	Chris Kendall	2,941

=== Round 19 ===
Home	Score	Away	Match information
Home	Score	Away	Date and time (BST)	Venue	Referee	Attendance
St Helens	10–20	Castleford Tigers	12 August 2021, 19:45	Totally Wicked Stadium	Ben Thaler	7,050
Catalans Dragons	31–16	Hull FC	13 August 2021, 18:15	Stade Gilbert Brutus	James Child	7,129
Salford Red Devils	18–12	Huddersfield Giants	13 August 2021, 19:30	AJ Bell Stadium	Chris Kendall	3,066
Hull KR	26–14	Wigan Warriors	13 August 2021, 19:45	Hull College Craven Park	Liam Moore	6,230
Leigh Centurions	10–46	Leeds Rhinos	13 August 2021, 20:00	Leigh Sports Village	Robert Hicks	2,818
Wakefield Trinity	28–22	Warrington Wolves	15 August 2021, 15:00	The Mobile Rocket Stadium	Marcus Griffiths	3,445

=== Round 20 (Rivals Round) ===
Home	Score	Away	Match information
Home	Score	Away	Date and time (BST)	Venue	Referee	Attendance
Leeds Rhinos	18–12	Huddersfield Giants	19 August 2021, 19:45	Emerald Headingley	Ben Thaler
Wigan Warriors	2–26	St Helens	20 August 2021, 19:45	DW Stadium	Chris Kendall	16,319
Hull FC	23–22	Hull KR	21 August 2021, 15:00	MKM Stadium	Liam Moore	15,000
Castleford Tigers	23–18	Wakefield Trinity	21 August 2021, 19:00	Mend-A-Hose Jungle	James Child	4,897
Leigh Centurions	32–22	Salford Red Devils	22 August 2021, 16:30	Leigh Sports Village	Marcus Griffiths	3,304
Warrington Wolves	P–P	Catalans Dragons	TBC (Note: Match postponed on 19 August, after Catalans reported 4 members of essential staff testing positive for COVID-19.)	Halliwell Jones Stadium

=== Round 21 ===
Home	Score	Away	Match information
Home	Score	Away	Date and time (BST)	Venue	Referee	Attendance
Wigan Warriors	0–14	Leeds Rhinos	25 August 2021, 19:45	DW Stadium	Robert Hicks	11,390
Salford Red Devils	14–42	Catalans Dragons	26 August 2021, 19:30	AJ Bell Stadium	Liam Moore	2,742
Huddersfield Giants	6–26	Warrington Wolves	26 August 2021, 19:45	John Smiths Stadium	James Child	4,017
Hull FC	12–23	Castleford Tigers	26 August 2021, 19:45	MKM Stadium	Ben Thaler	8,121
Hull KR	18–25	Wakefield Trinity	26 August 2021, 19:45	Hull College Craven Park	Marcus Griffiths	6,429
St Helens	42–12	Leigh Centurions	26 August 2021, 19:45	Totally Wicked Stadium	Tom Grant	8,221

=== Round 22 ===
Home	Score	Away	Match information
Home	Score	Away	Date and time (BST)	Venue	Referee	Attendance
Salford Red Devils	42–14	Hull FC	30 August 2021, 14:00	AJ Bell Stadium	Scott Mikalauskas	3,297
Wakefield Trinity	20–13	Leeds Rhinos	30 August 2021, 15:00	The Mobile Rocket Stadium	Chris Kendall	5,420
Castleford Tigers	0–22	Wigan Warriors	30 August 2021, 17:00	The Mend-A-Hose Jungle	James Child	4,729
Catalans Dragons	64–0	Leigh Centurions	30 August 2021, 18:15	Stade Gilbert Brutus	Aaron Moore	6,512
Huddersfield Giants	40–28	Hull KR	30 August 2021, 19:30	John Smiths Stadium	Robert Hicks	3,652
Warrington Wolves	14–24	St Helens	30 August 2021, 19:30	Halliwell Jones Stadium	Liam Moore	10,006

=== Round 23 (Magic Weekend) ===
Home	Score	Away	Match information
Home	Score	Away	Date and time (BST)	Venue	Referee	Attendance
Castleford Tigers	29–18	Salford Red Devils	4 September 2021, 15:00	St James' Park	Chris Kendall	35,104
St Helens	30–31 (Note: After golden point extra time)	Catalans Dragons	4 September 2021, 17:15	St James' Park	Liam Moore	35,104
Leeds Rhinos	25–24 (Note: After golden point extra time)	Hull F.C.	4 September 2021, 19:30	St James' Park	Robert Hicks	35,104
Huddersfield Giants	18–32	Wakefield Trinity	5 September 2021, 13:00	St James' Park	Ben Thaler	25,762
Wigan Warriors	6–10	Warrington Wolves	5 September 2021, 15:15	St James' Park	James Child	25,762
Leigh Centurions	6–44	Hull KR	5 September 2021, 17:30	St James' Park	Marcus Griffiths	25,762

=== Round 24 ===
Home	Score	Away	Match information
Home	Score	Away	Date and time (BST)	Venue	Referee	Attendance
St Helens	40–6	Leeds Rhinos	10 September 2021, 19:45	Totally Wicked Stadium	Chris Kendall	12,568
Warrington Wolves	20–19 (Note: After golden point extra time)	Salford Red Devils	11 September 2021, 15:00	Halliwell Jones Stadium	Scott Mikalauskas	7,351
Hull FC	0–10	Wigan Warriors	11 September 2021, 15:00	MKM Stadium	Liam Moore	10,003
Catalans Dragons	18–30	Huddersfield Giants	11 September 2021, 17:00	Stade Gilbert Brutus	Tom Grant	7,318
Hull KR	26–19	Castleford Tigers	12 September 2021, 15:00	Hull College Craven Park	James Child	6,840
Leigh Centurions	26–18	Wakefield Trinity	12 September 2021, 15:00	Leigh Sports Village	Robert Hicks	2,905

=== Round 25 ===
Home	Score	Away	Match information
Home	Score	Away	Date and time (BST)	Venue	Referee	Attendance
Castleford Tigers	24–40	Warrington Wolves	16 September 2021, 19:45	The Mend-A-Hose Jungle	Liam Moore	5,126
Leeds Rhinos	36–12	Hull KR	17 September 2021, 19:45	Emerald Headingley	Chris Kendall	13,106
Salford Red Devils	26–14	St Helens	17 September 2021, 19:45	AJ Bell Stadium	Marcus Griffiths	3,789
Wakefield Trinity	44–10	Hull FC	17 September 2021, 19:45	The Mobile Rocket Stadium	Robert Hicks	4,039
Wigan Warriors	12–8	Catalans Dragons	17 September 2021, 19:45	DW Stadium	James Child	12,852
Huddersfield Giants	42–24	Leigh Centurions	19 September 2021, 15:00	John Smiths Stadium	Tom Grant	3,867

== Play-offs ==
=== Team bracket ===
Eliminators
3	Warrington Wolves	0
6	Hull Kingston Rovers	19
4	Wigan Warriors	0
5	Leeds Rhinos	8

Semi-finals
1	Catalans Dragons	28
6	Hull Kingston Rovers	10
2	St Helens	36
5	Leeds Rhinos	8

Grand Final
1	Catalans Dragons	10
2	St Helens	12

=== Week 1: Eliminators ===
23 September 2021
19:45 BST (UTC+01)

Wigan Warriors	0–8	Leeds Rhinos
	Report (RFL); Report (Sky Sports)	Tries: Handley 50'; Goals: Martin 51', 74' (pen)

DW Stadium, Wigan
Attendance: 7,396
Referee: Robert Hicks

24 September 2021
19:45 BST (UTC+01)

Warrington Wolves	0–19	Hull Kingston Rovers
	Report (RFL); Report (Sky Sports)	Tries: Abdull 17'; Lewis 48'; Keinhorst 68'; Goals: Abdull 18', 49', 57' (pen); Drop goals: Abdull 73'

Halliwell Jones Stadium, Warrington
Attendance: 6,252
Referee: Liam Moore

=== Week 2: Semi-finals ===
30 September 2021
19:45 CEST (UTC+02)

Catalans Dragons	28–10	Hull Kingston Rovers
Tries: Garcia 9'; Drinkwater 31'; Mourgue 41'; Yaha 62'; Chan 68'; Goals: Maloney 10', 32', 69', 80' (pen)	Report (RFL); Report (Sky Sports)	Tries: Kenny Dowall 35'; Hall 75'; Goals: Abdull 76'

Stade Gilbert Brutus, Perpignan
Attendance: 11,530
Referee: James Child

1 October 2021
19:45 BST (UTC+01)

St Helens	36–8	Leeds Rhinos
Tries: Grace 6' 78'; Roby 24'; Percival 51', 73'; Naiqama 60'; Goals: Coote 14' (pen), 22' (pen), 25', 61', 74', 79'	Report (RFL); Report (Sky Sports)	Tries: T. Briscoe (yellow card) 21'; Myler 38'; L. Briscoe 68'

Totally Wicked Stadium, St Helens
Attendance: 11,688
Referee: Chris Kendall

=== Week 3: Grand Final ===
9 October 2021
18:00 BST (UTC+01)

Catalans Dragons	10–12	St Helens
Tries: McMeeken 50'; Goals: Maloney 9' (pen), 27' (pen), 51'	Report (RFL); Report (Sky Sports)	Tries: Naiqama 13' 66; Makinson (yellow card) 45'; Goals: Coote 21' (pen), 67'

Old Trafford, Manchester
Attendance: 45,177
Referee: Liam Moore
Harry Sunderland Award:
Kevin Naiqama (St Helens)
