= Brad Graham =

English rugby league footballer

Personal information
- Full name: Bradley Graham
- Born: 1 September 2001 (age 24) Wakefield, Yorkshire, England
- Height: 6 ft 3 in (1.91 m)
- Weight: 15 st 2 lb (96 kg)

Playing information
- Position: Centre, Wing
Club
Years	Team	Pld	T	G	FG	P
2020–21	Castleford Tigers	3	1	0	0	4
2022–24	Dewsbury Rams	62	19	0	0	76
2025	Halifax Panthers	21	6	0	0	24
2026–	Dewsbury Rams	3	1	0	0	4
	Total	89	27	0	0	108
- Source: As of 20 April 2026

Brad Graham (born 1 September 2001) is an English professional rugby league player who plays in the second-row for the Dewsbury Rams in the Betfred Championship.

== Career ==
England Youth International touring France in July 2018.

=== Castleford Tigers ===
In 2020 he made his Super League début for Castleford Tigers against Hull FC.

In June 2021 he made his second Super League appearance for Castleford Tigers against Catalan Dragons.

In August 2021 he made his third Super League appearance for Castleford Tigers against Huddersfield Giants. He also scored his first Super League try.

=== Dewsbury Rams ===
On 19 November 2021 it was reported that he had signed for Dewsbury in the RFL Championship.

On 7 February 2022, he made his debut for Dewsbury. In September 2022 he signed a one-year deal to remain at Dewsbury during their League 1 campaign in 2023. On 26 May 2023 he was named in the Betfred League One team of the month for May 2023 in the left second row position. On 6 August 2023 he played in the left second row position v Workington. Dewsbury won 38-8 and finished as champions of the Betfred League One. They gained promotion to the Championship in 2024. On 3 October 2023 he signed a new twelve-month contract to remain at the Dewsbury club in 2024 where they would play back in the rugby league championship. On 31 May 2024 he made his 50th professional appearance against his hometown club Wakefield Trinity.

=== Halifax Panthers ===
On 14 November 2024 it was reported that he had signed for Halifax in the RFL Championship on a two-year deal. On 26 February 2025 made Halifax debut v Thatto Heath in a 48-6 challenge cup win.

=== Dewsbury Rams (re-join) ===
Prior to the 2026 season, Dewsbury Rams announced his return
