= Jordan Tansey =

English rugby league footballer

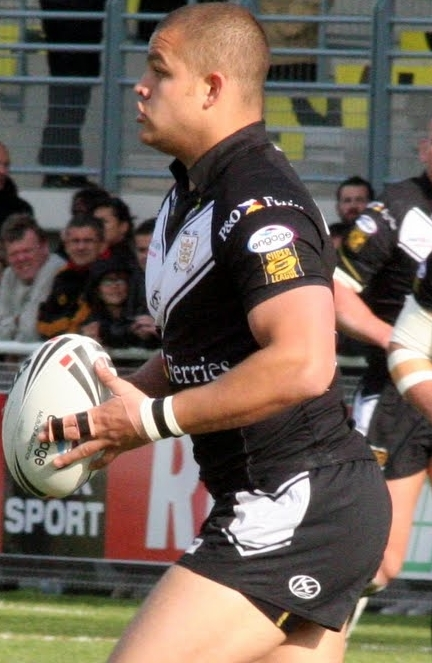

Personal information
- Full name: Jordan Lewis Tansey
- Born: 9 September 1986 (age 40) Leeds, West Yorkshire, England
- Height: 5 ft 9 in (1.76 m)
- Weight: 14 st 7 lb (92 kg)

Playing information
- Position: Fullback, Wing
Club
Years	Team	Pld	T	G	FG	P
2006–08	Leeds Rhinos	53	21	2	0	88
2009	Sydney Roosters	7	1	0	0	4
2009–11	Hull F.C.	31	10	0	0	40
2011(DR)	→ Dewsbury Rams	4	0	0	0	0
2011	Crusaders RL	18	5	0	0	20
2012	York City Knights	17	1	0	0	4
2013–15	Castleford Tigers	48	15	0	0	60
2015–16	Wakefield Trinity Wildcats	8	1	4	0	12
2016(loan)	→ Huddersfield Giants	2	1	1	0	6
2018	Workington Town	8	0	12	1	25
	Total	196	55	19	1	259
- Source: As of 25 December 2020

Jordan Tansey (born 9 September 1986) is an English rugby league footballer who plays as a fullback or winger.

He has previously played for Crusaders RL, Castleford Tigers, Hull FC, Leeds Rhinos and the Wakefield Trinity Wildcats in the Super League, the York City Knights in the Co-operative Championship and the Sydney Roosters in the NRL. Tansey has also played temporarily for the Dewsbury Rams and the Huddersfield Giants and on a permanent basis for Betfred League 1 side Workington Town.

He is perhaps best known for scoring the decisive try in Leeds Rhinos' Millennium Magic 2007 match against the Bradford Bulls, when he followed up a Kevin Sinfield penalty in the last play of the game which hit the crossbar; had the penalty gone over Leeds would only have drawn 38-38.

== Early life ==
As a child Tansey lived in Whinmoor, Leeds. He attended Boston Spa Comprehensive School from 1998-2002, where he played for the school football team as a striker. Fellow pro Rugby League player Danny Williams also attended Boston Spa school and played for the same football team as Tansey. The two would eventually transition to Rugby despite Boston Spa School not having an actual Rugby team.

== Sydney Roosters ==
On 1 October 2008, Tansey agreed to a deal with Australian NRL side Sydney Roosters for two years. He was meant to rejoin the Leeds Rhinos but instead, on 4 June 2009, Tansey signed with the Hull FC for the 2010 season.

== Return to Super League ==
He returned to England with the Hull FC rugby league club after being granted an early release from the Sydney Roosters against their win over the Crusaders. His contract was terminated following a disciplinary hearing in February 2011. He subsequently joined Crusaders. Tansey signed a one-year contract with York City Knights in January 2012. He then joined Castleford Tigers in 2013, playing for two years before being transferred to Wakefield Trinity Wildcats mid-season in 2015.

In 2018, he had trials with Hull Kingston Rovers and the Sheffield Eagles.
