= Justin Carney =

Australian rugby league footballer

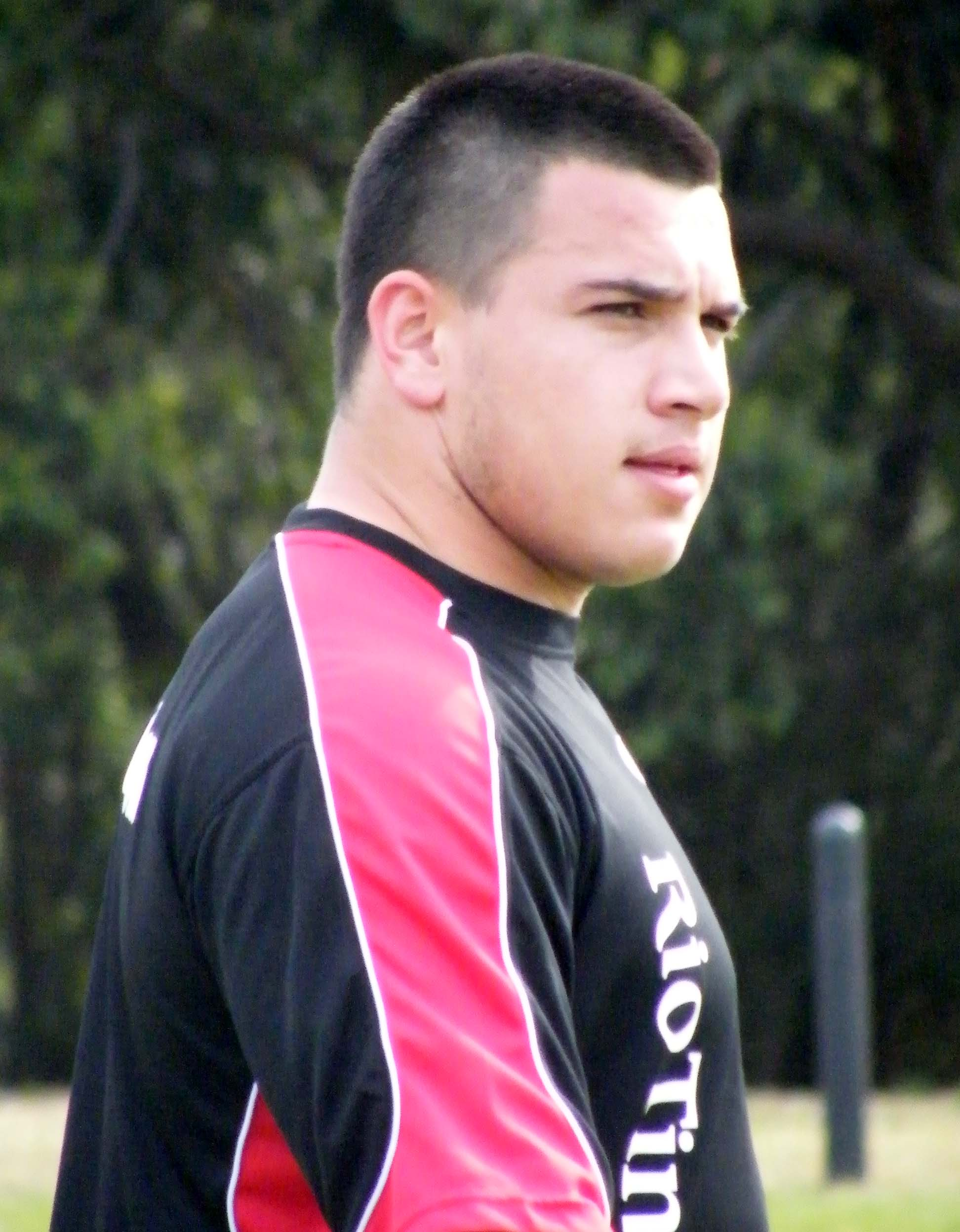

Personal information
- Full name: Justin Robert Carney
- Born: 19 June 1988 (age 38) Dubbo, New South Wales, Australia
- Height: 178 cm (5 ft 10 in)
- Weight: 96 kg (15 st 2 lb)

Playing information
- Position: Wing, Centre
Club
Years	Team	Pld	T	G	FG	P
2008–10	Canberra Raiders	20	12	0	0	48
2011–12	Sydney Roosters	17	3	0	0	12
2013–15	Castleford Tigers	62	63	0	0	252
2016–17	Salford Red Devils	27	10	0	0	40
2017–18	Hull Kingston Rovers	21	6	0	0	24
	Total	147	94	0	0	376
Representative
Years	Team	Pld	T	G	FG	P
2008	Dreamtime Team	1	1	0	0	4
- Source: As of 11 August 2018

Justin Robert Carney (born 19 June 1988) is an Australian former professional rugby league footballer who played on the wing or as a centre. He played for Canberra Raiders and the Sydney Roosters in Australia, and Castleford Tigers, Salford Red Devils and Hull Kingston Rovers in the United Kingdom.

== Career ==
=== Canberra Raiders ===
Carney began his career with the Canberra Raiders, scoring two tries on his debut in a 34–16 win over the Brisbane Broncos in June 2008. He suffered a broken leg during a match against Gold Coast in July 2009, which ruled him out for the rest of the 2009 season and all the 2010 season. Carney was nominated for the 2009 Ken Stephen Medal, acknowledging his strong community work.

=== Sydney Roosters ===
Carney joined Sydney Roosters in July 2010. He spent two seasons at the club, scoring three tries in 17 games.

=== Castleford Tigers ===
Carney joined Castleford Tigers on a two-year contract from the 2013 season. Coach Ian Millward said of him, "Justin will become a crowd pleaser with his robust running and dynamic style. No one will run the ball harder or faster in the Super League in 2013." Carney scored 31 tries in 28 games for Castleford and, in April 2014, signed a new five-year deal up to the end of 2019.

He played in the 2014 Challenge Cup Final defeat by the Leeds Rhinos at Wembley Stadium.

However, he was suspended by Castleford in August 2015 and did not play again for the rest of the season. He had scored 63 tries in 62 games since joining Castleford in 2013.

=== Salford Red Devils ===
Carney joined Salford Red Devils in November 2015 on a one-year loan deal, which was converted to a permanent three-year deal in April 2016. He received an eight-match ban in May 2017 after being found guilty of racial abuse and left Salford by mutual consent.

=== Hull KR ===
After leaving Salford, Carney joined Hull Kingston Rovers for the rest of the 2018 season. He retired at the end of the season and returned to Australia, where he joined Nyngan Tigers as captain-coach for 2019.

On 3 July 2023 it was reported that he had received a lengthy ban whilst playing for his new club Albury Thunder, where he is the player-coach.
