= Ash Robson =

English rugby league footballer

Personal information
- Full name: Ashley Harold Robson
- Born: 4 November 1995 (age 29); York, England

Playing information
- Height: 5 ft 11 in (181 cm)
- Weight: 14 st 13 lb (95 kg)
- Position: Fullback, Scrum-half
Club
Years	Team	Pld	T	G	FG	P
2015–16	Castleford Tigers	3	1	0	0	4
2017–19	York City Knights	47	27	17	0	142
	Total	50	28	17	0	146

Ash Robson (born 4 November 1995) is a former rugby league footballer who played as a scrum-half or fullback for Castleford Tigers and York City Knights.

== Background ==
Robson was born in York, England.

== Career ==
As a junior, Robson played for York Acorn A.R.L.F.C. then signed for Super League side Castleford Tigers, with whom he made three first-team appearances in the 2015 season. His contract at Castleford was extended until the end of the 2017 season but a knee injury in a pre-season friendly caused him to miss the entire 2016 season. In January 2017 he signed a three-year deal with York City Knights in the Championship.

He announced his retirement from rugby league in May 2022.
