= Cheyse Blair =

Australian professional rugby league footballer

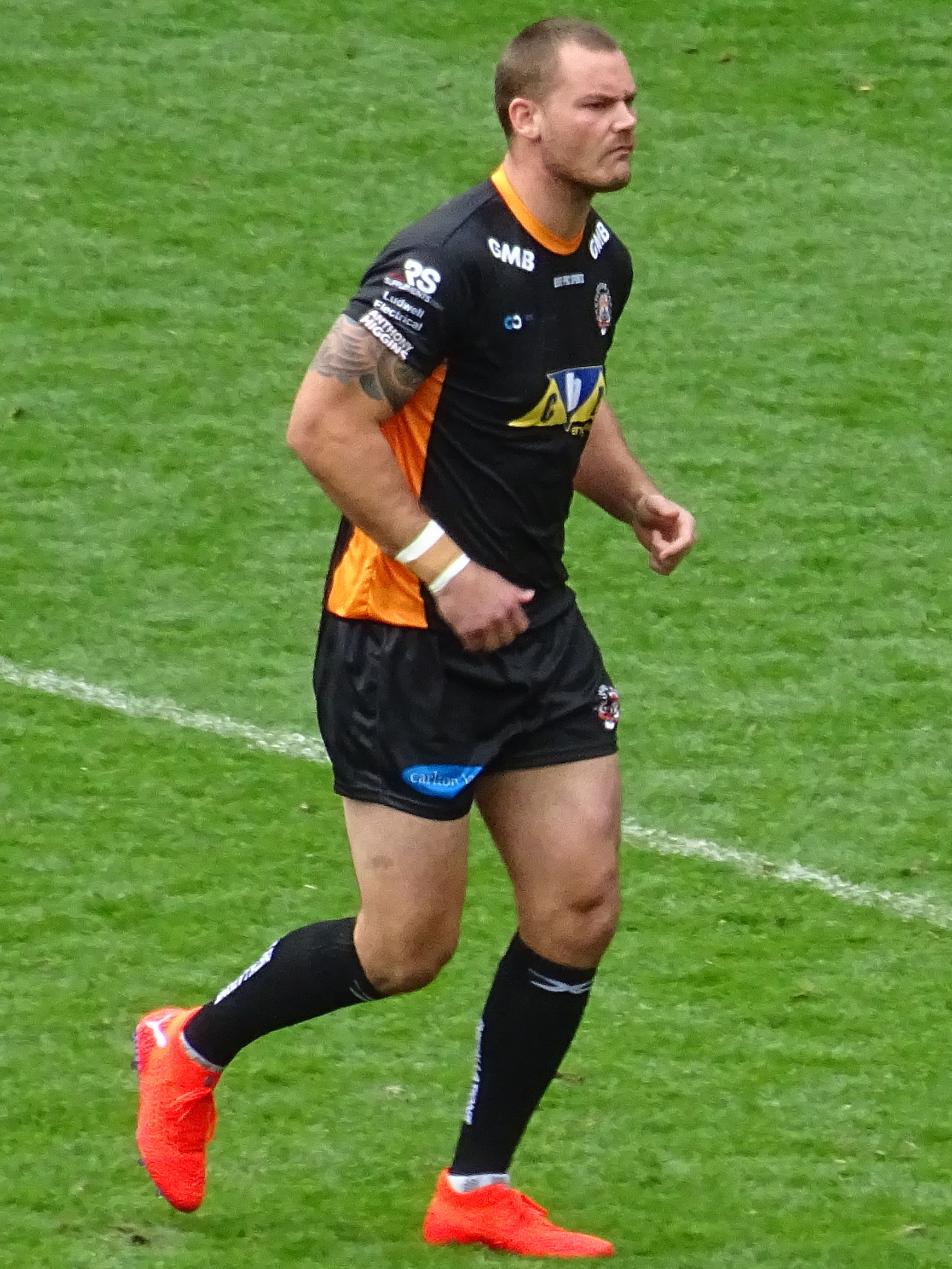

Personal information
- Born: 18 January 1992 (age 34) Tweed Heads, New South Wales, Australia
- Height: 6 ft 4 in (1.93 m)
- Weight: 16 st 7 lb (105 kg)

Playing information
- Position: Centre, Wing, Second-row
Club
Years	Team	Pld	T	G	FG	P
2012–13	Parramatta Eels	28	7	0	0	28
2014–15	Manly Sea Eagles	16	8	0	0	32
2016–18	Melbourne Storm	38	18	0	0	72
2019–22	Castleford Tigers	48	9	0	0	36
	Total	130	42	0	0	168
Representative
Years	Team	Pld	T	G	FG	P
2017	NSW Country	1	0	0	0	0
- Source: As of 18 January 2023

Cheyse Blair (born 18 January 1992) is an Australian former professional rugby league footballer who last played as a centre or second-row forward for the Castleford Tigers in the Super League.

He previously played for the Parramatta Eels, Manly-Warringah Sea Eagles and the Melbourne Storm in the NRL. He played for Country NSW in 2017 and played as a winger earlier in his career.

== Early life ==
Blair was born in Tweed Heads, New South Wales, Australia.

He played his rugby league for the Bilambil Jets and attended Tweed River High School.

== Club career ==
=== Sydney Roosters (2010–11) ===
Blair played for the Sydney Roosters in the National Youth Competition after being selected for the Australian Schoolboys. Blair made the Roosters first grade 25-man squad, but did not play. Blair signed with the Parramatta Eels late 2011 hoping for first grade spot.

=== Parramatta Eels (2012–13) ===
Blair moved to Parramatta for the 2012 NRL season and made his NRL debut in round 1 2012, against the Brisbane Broncos at Parramatta Stadium. He scored his first try the next game against the New Zealand Warriors in round 2.

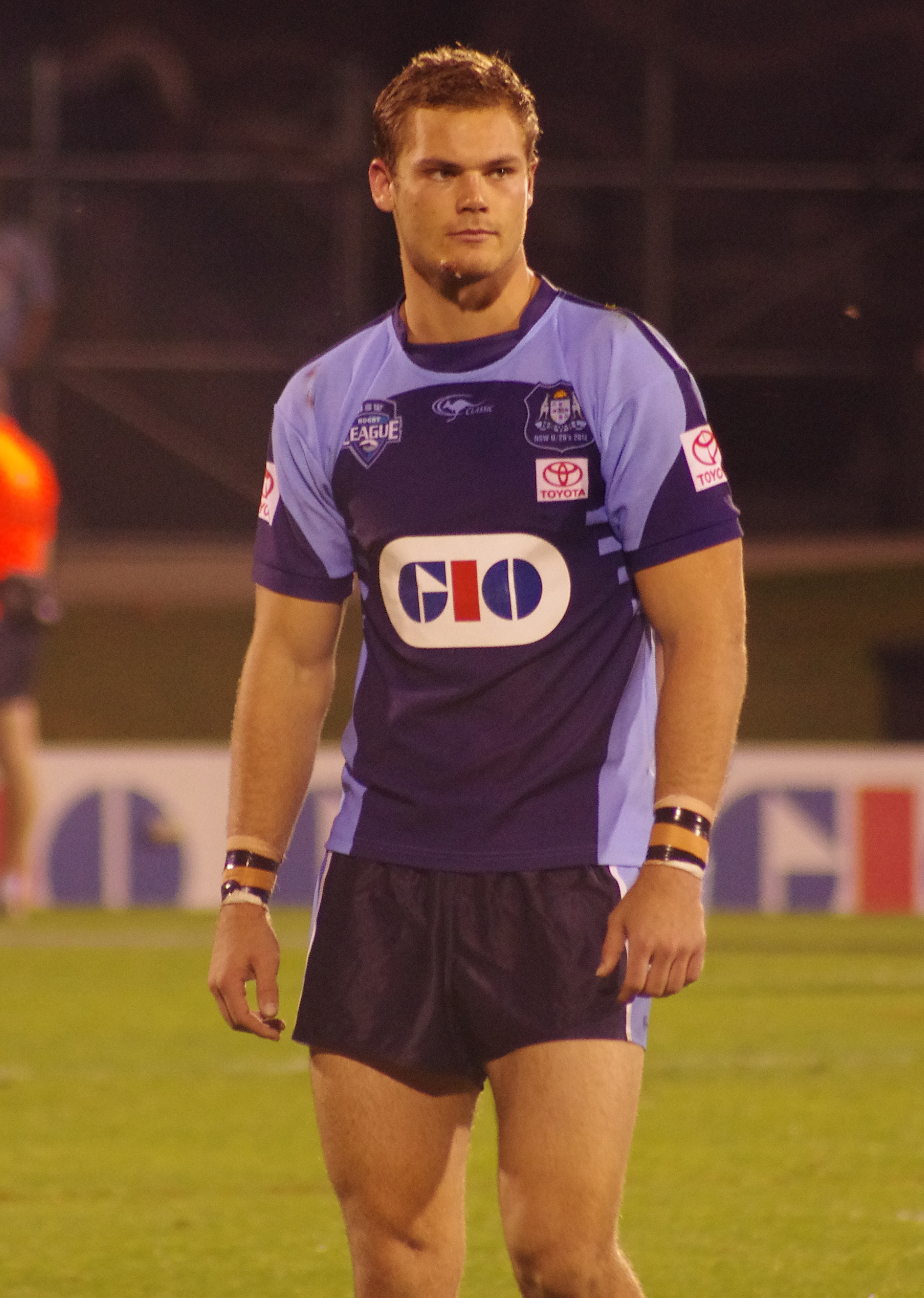
Blair playing for the New South Wales Under 20s in 2012

Blair made 22 appearances in his first year at Parramatta as the club finished last on the table for the first time since 1972. In June 2013, Blair was one of 12 Parramatta players that were told that their futures at the club were uncertain by coach, Ricky Stuart. Blair later said of the incident “Then came the overhead projector,’’ Blair said, and everything changed... and when you have no idea it’s coming — shattering. To see my name up there with the whole club watching on — players, staff, everyone — I just couldn’t believe it", at the time, I was actually happy to be injured . . . I didn't know how the other guys would be able to go back and play for a coach who didn't want them, I remember later that same afternoon, one of the Eels staff members rang to check on each of us and I know a lot of the boys were really upset". Blair was limited to only six appearances for Parramatta in the 2013 NRL season as the club finished last for a second consecutive year.

=== Manly-Warringah Sea Eagles (2014–15) ===
Blair signed with 2013 NRL Grand Finalist Manly-Warringah for the 2014 NRL season. After starting the season playing on the wing, Blair spent much of the season playing for Manly's NSW Cup team due to the form of Peta Hiku and the return from injury of Jorge Taufua. He played 9 first grade games for Manly in 2014, including being selected on the wing (after Taufua was dropped for poor form) in Manly's controversial 18-17 golden point extra time loss to Canterbury Bankstown in the Semi finals. He was contracted to the Sea Eagles until the end of the 2015 NRL season.

=== Melbourne Storm (2016–2019) ===
On 8 October 2015, Blair signed a one-year contract with the Melbourne Storm starting in 2016. He played in the 2016 NRL Grand Final against Cronulla-Sutherland which Melbourne lost 14–12. On 13 July 2017 Blair was ruled out for the rest of the NRL season with an ankle injury and missed out on being a part of Melbourne's 2017 premiership winning team.

=== Castleford Tigers (2019–2022) ===
On 12 April 2019 it was announced that Blair had signed a three-and-a-half-year deal with Super League club Castleford Tigers after being allowed to exit his contract early with Melbourne Storm. Castleford Director of Rugby Jon Wells described Blair's signing as "a huge statement of intent for the Tigers". He was assigned squad number 35. Blair joined a Castleford side in the midst of an injury crisis and was "thrown in at the deep end and started playing straight away". He later recalled: "I was still finding my feet and I didn’t play my best footy or settle in as quick as I wanted to." Blair made 18 appearances, all as a centre, and scored 2 tries in his first season with the Tigers. Blair was given the number 18 ahead of the 2020 season. He had a brilliant start to the year, surpassing his maiden season's try tally in just the fourth round with a score against local rivals Wakefield Trinity. Blair alternated between second-row and centre during this time. In round 19 of the 2022 Super League season, Blair was sent off during Castlefords 35–22 victory over Warrington for a deliberate high tackle. Blair was later suspended for two matches over the incident. On 20 May 2022, it was announced that Blair would be departing Castleford at the end of the 2022 Super League season. On 18 January 2023, Blair announced his retirement from rugby league via social media. Blair went on to say “I want to say I’m hanging the laces up from professional rugby league. Coaching staff, thank you for the great opportunity to play this great game. To the fans, cheers for all the support and love of the long sleeve. Also cheers to the keyboard warriors, you all kept a smile on my face and kept it entertaining. To Tam and my beautiful family thanks for sticking by me this hole time, I love you. Now the real life begins".

== Representative career ==
Blair has represented the NSW and Australian Schoolboys teams.

== Personal life ==
His brother, Cory Blair has represented the USA Eagles in rugby union.
