= Calum Turner =

English rugby league footballer

Personal information
- Born: 29 April 1999 (age 27) Castleford, West Yorkshire, England

Playing information
- Position: Fullback, Wing
Club
Years	Team	Pld	T	G	FG	P
2018–20	Castleford Tigers	15	4	10	0	36
2019(loan)	→ Featherstone Rovers	8	2	12	0	32
2021	Newcastle Thunder	0	0	0	0	0
2022–24	Dewsbury Rams	54	1	7	0	18
2025	Featherstone Rovers	0	1	0	0	0
	Total	77	8	29	0	86
- Source: As of 24 November 2024

Calum Turner (born 29 April 1999) is an English professional rugby league player who plays as a fullback who is currently a free agent.

He has previously played for the Castleford Tigers in the Super League, and was on loan from Castleford at Featherstone Rovers in the 2019 Betfred Championship.

== Playing career ==
=== Castleford Tigers ===
In 2018, he made his Super League début for the Tigers against Hull FC.

=== Featherstone Rovers ===
On 21 November 2024, it was reported that he had signed for Featherstone in the RFL Championship on a one-year deal.
