= Bailey Hodgson =

English rugby league footballer (born 2002)

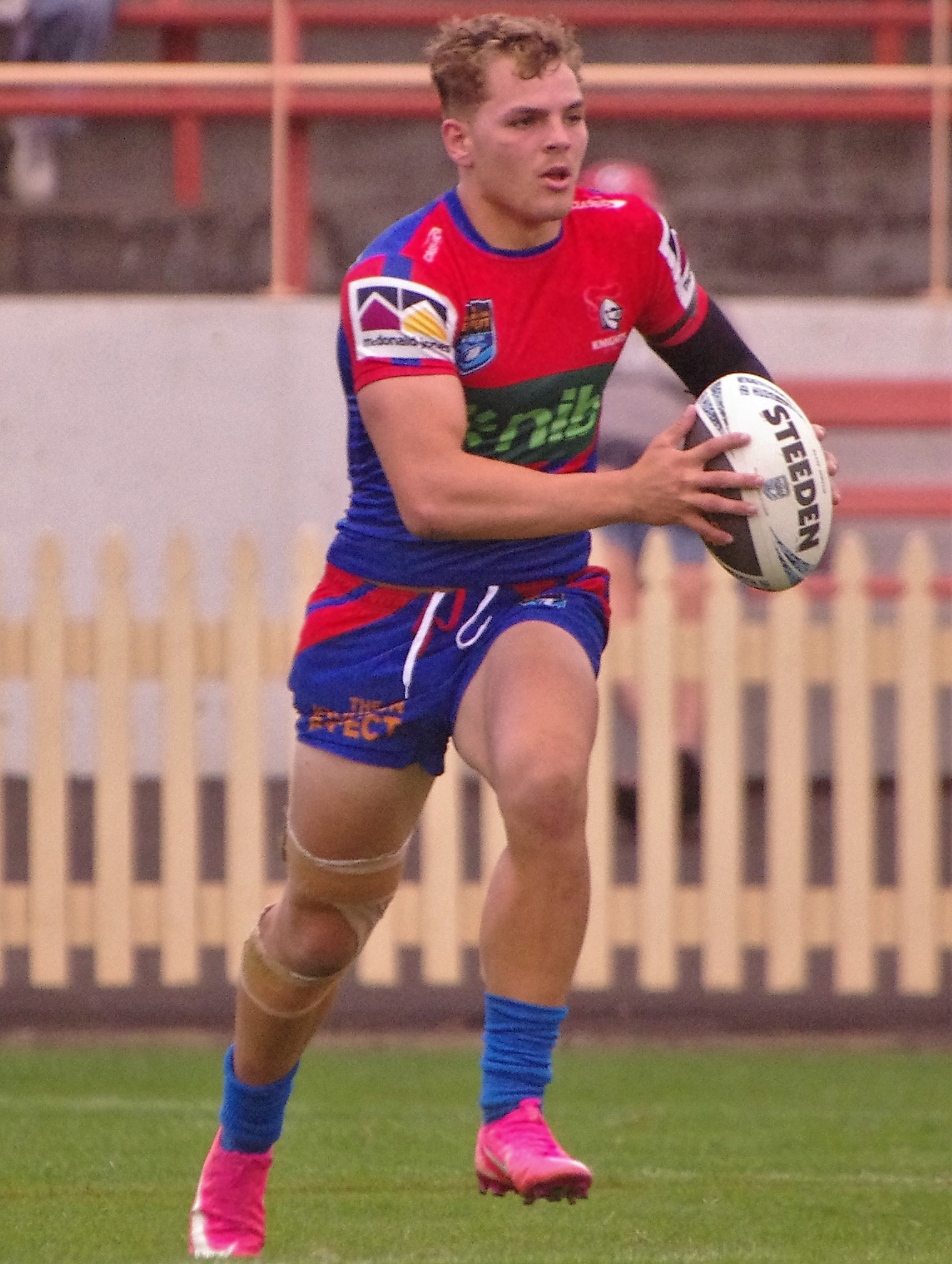

Personal information
- Born: 5 September 2002 (age 24) Hull, East Riding of Yorkshire, England
- Height: 6 ft 0 in (1.82 m)
- Weight: 13 st 5 lb (85 kg)

Playing information
- Position: Fullback
Club
Years	Team	Pld	T	G	FG	P
2020	Castleford Tigers	1	0	0	0	0
2021–23	Newcastle Knights	0	0	0	0	0
2024	Manly Sea Eagles	0	0	0	0	0
2024–26	Leigh Leopards	40	10	2	0	44
2027–	Hull F.C.	0	0	0	0	0
	Total	41	10	2	0	44
- Source: As of 19 October 2026
- Relatives: Josh Hodgson (uncle)

Bailey Hodgson (born 5 September 2002) is an English professional rugby league footballer who plays as a fullback for the Hull FC in the Super League.

He previously played for the Castleford Tigers in the Super League and Blacktown Workers in the NSW Cup.

== Background ==
Hodgson was born in Hull, England.He is the nephew of Parramatta Eels and English international hooker Josh Hodgson.

== Playing career ==
=== Castleford Tigers ===
In 2020, Hodgson made his Super League début for Castleford Tigers in round 17 against Hull Kingston Rovers.

=== Newcastle Knights ===
In November 2020, Hodgson signed a three-year contract with Australian side Newcastle starting in 2021.

After three injury riddled years at the Newcastle outfit, Hodgson parted ways with the club at the end of the 2023 season, failing to play an NRL match.

=== Manly Sea Eagles & Blacktown Workers ===
On 6 November, it was reported that he had signed with the Manly Warringah Sea Eagles, on the supplementary list.

He also appeared in pre-season ahead of the current campaign for Manly, but again failed to make a competitive senior appearance this year for the Sea Eagles.

Instead, he has featured for their feeder club – the Blacktown Workers – in the New South Wales Cup.

=== Leigh Leopards ===
On 25 July 2024 it was reported that he had signed for Leigh in the Super League on a 2½-year deal.

=== Hull FC ===
On 4 August 2026 it was reported that he had signed for Hull FC in the Super League on a 2-year deal
