= 2008 Leeds Rhinos season =

- Super League XIII Rank: 2nd
- Challenge Cup: Semi Finalists

Team information
- Coach: (New Zealand) Brian McClennan
- Stadium: Headingley Stadium
- Avg. attendance: 5,087
- High attendance: 19,296

Top scorers
- Tries: Scott Donald
- Goals: Kevin Sinfield
- Points: Kevin Sinfield
← 2007	List of seasons	2009 →

The 2008 Leeds Rhinos season saw the club compete in Super League XIII as well as the 2008 Challenge Cup tournament.

== Events by month ==
=== February ===
- Super League 13 Started on Friday, 2 February (ko 7.30pm )with Leeds beating Hull KR 20–12 at Headingley.
- 29th, Leeds beat Australasian Grand Final winners Melbourne Storm in the 2008 World Club Challenge 10–4 at Elland Road.

=== March ===
- The Rhinos lost their first game against Castleford Tigers on 7 March, (Round 5 of Super League) at The Jungle. This was also Castleford's first win of the season.

=== April ===
- Super League club played first game in the Challenge cup.

=== May ===
- Leeds Rhinos defeated Bradford Bulls 40–26 in the 2nd Millennium Magic at Cardiff's Millennium Stadium

=== June ===
- Harlequins inflicted only the Rhinos 3rd defeat of the Season when they won 28–24 at the Twickenham Stoop

=== July ===
- Leeds played St. Helens in the Challenge Cup Semi Final on 26 July 2008.

== 2008 squad ==
As of 16 June 2008

Nationality	Squad No	Player	Position	App	Tries	Goals	DG	Points
(New Zealand)	1	Brent Webb	Full-Back	17	10	0	0	40
(Australia)	2	Scott Donald	Wing	17	17	0	0	68
(New Zealand)	3	Clinton Toopi	Centre	4	0	0	0	0
(England)	4	Keith Senior	Centre	17	10	0	0	40
(England)	5	Lee Smith	Wing	10	4	0	0	16
(England)	6	Danny McGuire	Stand-off	12	7	0	0	28
(England)	7	Rob Burrow	Scrum-Half	17	12	6	0	60
(New Zealand)	8	Kylie Leuluai	Prop	15	3	0	0	12
(England)	9	Matt Diskin	Hooker	16	4	0	0	16
(England)	10	Jamie Peacock	Prop	15	2	0	0	8
(England)	11	Jamie Jones-Buchanan	Second-Row	10	3	0	0	12
(England)	12	Gareth Ellis	Second-Row	15	2	0	0	8
(England)	13	Kevin Sinfield (C)	Loose-Forward	17	2	74	0	156
(Samoa)	14	Ali Lauitiiti	Second-Row	11	4	0	0	16
(England)	16	Ryan Bailey	Prop	14	0	0	0	0
(England)	17	Nick Scruton	Prop	15	1	0	0	4
(England)	18	Ian Kirke	Second-Row	4	1	0	0	4
(England)	19	Carl Ablett	Second-Row	14	3	0	0	12
(England)	20	Ashley Gibson	Centre	1	0	0	0	0
(England)	21	Jordan Tansey	Scrum half	12	2	0	0	8
(England)	22	Ryan Hall	Wing	8	3	0	0	12
(England)	23	Danny Williams	Wing	4	0	0	0	0
(England)	24	Luke Burgess	Prop	11	3	0	0	12
(England)	25	Danny Allan	Loose forward	0	0	0	0	0
(England)	26	Ben Kaye	Hooker	3	1	0	0	4
(England)	27	Michael Ratu	Centre	0	0	0	0	0
(England)	28	Simon Worrall	Second Row	8	1	0	0	4
(England)	29	Luke Gale	Scrum half	0	0	0	0	0
(England)	30	Michael Haley	Prop	0	0	0	0	0
(England)	31	Paul McShane	Hooker	0	0	0	0	0
(England)	32	Kallum Watkins	Centre	2	1	0	0	4
(England)	33	Joe Chandler	Prop	0	0	0	0	0
(England)	34	Ben Jones-Bishop	Full back	0	0	0	0	0
(France)	35	Eric Anselme	Second Row	3	2	0	0	8

== 2008 Player Signings/Transfers ==
Gains

Player	Previous club	Years signed
Luke Burgess	Doncaster	Resigned
Danny Williams	Castleford Tigers	Resigned
Eric Anselme	Albi	Loan (4 Months)

Losses

Losses
Player	Signed for	When left
Jamie Thackray	Hull F.C.	May

== Coaching Set-Up ==
Nationality	Staff Name	Position
(New Zealand)	Brian McClennan	Head Coach
(England)	Francis Cummins	Assistant Coach
(Samoa)	Willie Poching	Assistant Coach
(England)	Aleks Gross	Sports Scientist
(England)	Billy Watts	Timekeeper
(England)	Jason Davidson	Head Conditioner
(Wales)	Meirion Jones	Head Physiotherapist
(England)	Rob Wilson	Masseur

== 2008 Fixtures/Results ==
2008 Engage Super League

Rd	Home team	Score	Away team	Result (W/D/L)	Attendance
F	Leeds Rhinos	18 – 26	Wakefield Trinity Wildcats	L	10,143
F	Hunslet Hawks	6 – 50	Leeds Rhinos	W
F	Featherstone Rovers	20 – 42	Leeds Rhinos	W
F	Leeds Rhinos	50 – 4	Oldham	W
F	Leeds Rhinos	26 – 24	South Sydney Rabbitohs	W	12,500
4*	Leeds Rhinos	20 – 12	Hull KR	W	18,467
1	Huddersfield Giants	10 – 30	Leeds Rhinos	W	15,620
2	Wakefield Trinity Wildcats	8 – 44	Leeds Rhinos	W	9,863
3	Leeds Rhinos	34 – 6	Catalans Dragons	W	14,083
WCC	Leeds Rhinos	11 – 4	Melbourne Storm	W	33,204
5	Castleford Tigers	38 – 20	Leeds Rhinos	L	9,459
6	Leeds Rhinos	48 – 0	Harlequins	W	14,557
7	Leeds Rhinos	44 – 2	Bradford Bulls	W	19,296
8	Hull FC	4 – 30	Leeds Rhinos	W	14,113
9	St Helens	10 – 14	Leeds Rhinos	W	11,188
10	Leeds Rhinos	10–14	Wigan Warriors	L	18,769
11	Leeds Rhinos	32–12	Warrington Wolves	W	16,327
CCC4	Leeds Rhinos	38–16	Celtic Crusaders	W	5,087
12	Hull KR	22–36	Leeds Rhinos	W	9,391
13**	Bradford Bulls	26–40	Leeds Rhinos	W	30,628
CCC5	Harlequins RL	26–36	Leeds Rhinos	W	2,300
14	Leeds Rhinos	58–12	Wakefield Trinity Wildcats	W	17,647
15	Bradford Bulls	14–30	Leeds Rhinos	W	14,013
CCCQF	Leeds Rhinos	23–16	Wigan Warriors	W	10,129
16	Leeds Rhinos	38–22	Hull FC	W	16,886
17	Harlequins RL	28–24	Leeds Rhinos	L	3,769
18	Leeds Rhinos	12–26	St Helens	L	18,303
19	Leeds Rhinos	18–12	Castleford Tigers	W	17,619
20	Wigan Warriors	23–22	Leeds Rhinos	L	14,911
21	Leeds Rhinos	46–8	Huddersfield Giants	W	14,739
22	Catalans Dragons	24–37	Leeds Rhinos	W	9,880
CCCSF***	Leeds Rhinos	16–26	St Helens	L
23	Warrington Wolves	22–12	Leeds Rhinos	L	9,150
24	Leeds Rhinos	28–18	Bradford Bulls	W	17,508
25	Leeds Rhinos	54–12	Castleford Tigers	W	17,354
26	Wigan Warriors	16–52	Leeds Rhinos	W	14,778
27	Wakefield Trinity Wildcats	12–30	Leeds Rhinos	W	6,448
ESL PO1	N/A	N/A	N/A	N/A	N/A
ESL PO2	St Helens	30–10	Leeds Rhinos	L	11,407
ESL PO3	Leeds Rhinos	18–14	Wigan Warriors	W	13,112
ESLGF****	St Helens	16–24	Leeds Rhinos	W	68,810

*Round 4 played before round one to accommodate World Club Challenge on Round 4 weekend

**Round 13 played at Millennium Stadium, Cardiff.

***Carnegie Challenge Cup Semi-Final played at the Galpharm Stadium, Huddersfield

****engage Super League Grand Final played at Old Trafford, Manchester.

Super League XIII
Pos	Team	Pld	W	D	L	PF	PA	PD	Pts	Qualification
1	St. Helens (L)	27	21	1	5	940	457	+483	43	Semi-final
2	Leeds Rhinos (C)	27	21	0	6	863	413	+450	42	Semi-final
3	Catalans Dragons	27	16	2	9	694	625	+69	34	Elimination semi-finals
4	Wigan Warriors	27	13	3	11	648	698	−50	29	Elimination semi-finals
5	Bradford Bulls	27	14	0	13	705	625	+80	28	Elimination semi-finals
6	Warrington Wolves	27	14	0	13	690	713	−23	28	Elimination semi-finals
7	Hull Kingston Rovers	27	11	1	15	564	713	−149	23	
8	Wakefield Trinity Wildcats	27	11	0	16	574	760	−186	22	
9	Harlequins	27	11	0	16	569	763	−194	22	
10	Huddersfield Giants	27	10	1	16	638	681	−43	21	
11	Hull F.C.	27	8	1	18	538	699	−161	17	
12	Castleford Tigers	27	7	1	19	593	869	−276	15	

Source: superleague.co.uk
Rules for classification: 1st on competition points; 2nd on match points difference.
Competition points: for win = 2; for draw = 1; for loss = 0.
(C) Champions; (L) League Leaders' Shield Winners
