= 2009 Leeds Rhinos season =

- Super League XIV champions
- Super League XIV Rank: 1st
- Play-off result: Won Grand Final (St Helens R.F.C., 18–10)
- Challenge Cup: Lost fourth round (St Helens RLFC, 18–22)
- World Club Challenge: Lost Final (Manly-Warringah Sea Eagles, 20–28)
- 2009 record: Wins: 21; draws: 0; losses: 8
- Points scored: For: 805; against: 435

Team information
- Chairman: Paul Caddick
- Head coach: Brian McClennan
- Captains: Kevin Sinfield; Jamie Peacock
- Stadium: Headingley Stadium
- Avg. attendance: 15,312
- High attendance: 19,997 (St Helens RLFC, 4 September)

Top scorers
- Tries: Ryan Hall (31)
- Goals: Kevin Sinfield (116)
- Points: Kevin Sinfield (225)
← 2008	List of seasons	2010 →

This article details the Leeds Rhinos 2009 Super League XIV season.

== Notable moments ==
=== February ===
- February 6 – The Rhinos kick off their Super League season against the Crusaders, winning 28 – 6 at home.
- February 14 – It was announced that new signing Greg Eastwood had been denied a work visa to play for the Rhinos.

=== March ===
- March 1 – Leeds lose the World Club Challenge 20–28 to Manly-Warringah Sea Eagles, at Elland Road.
- March 8 – Leeds beat Warrington Wolves 20–14 to maintain their place at the top of the Super League
- March 13 – Leeds beat Wigan Warriors 34–10 with an impressive performance to open up a two-point gap at the top the Super League.
- March 20 – Leeds lose their first league game of the season, to St Helens

=== April ===
- April 4 – Leeds are knocked out of the Challenge Cup in the fourth round by St Helens.
- April 10 – Bradford beat Leeds in the traditional Easter fixture.
- April 13 – Leeds' poor form continues, losing their third Super League fixture in four games, this time to Salford.
- April 18 – Leeds return to winning ways, beating Huddersfield away from home.
- April 24 – Leeds lose to Harlequins, almost being "nilled" for the first time in 11 years, narrowly avoiding this by scoring their only points with the last move of the game.

=== May ===
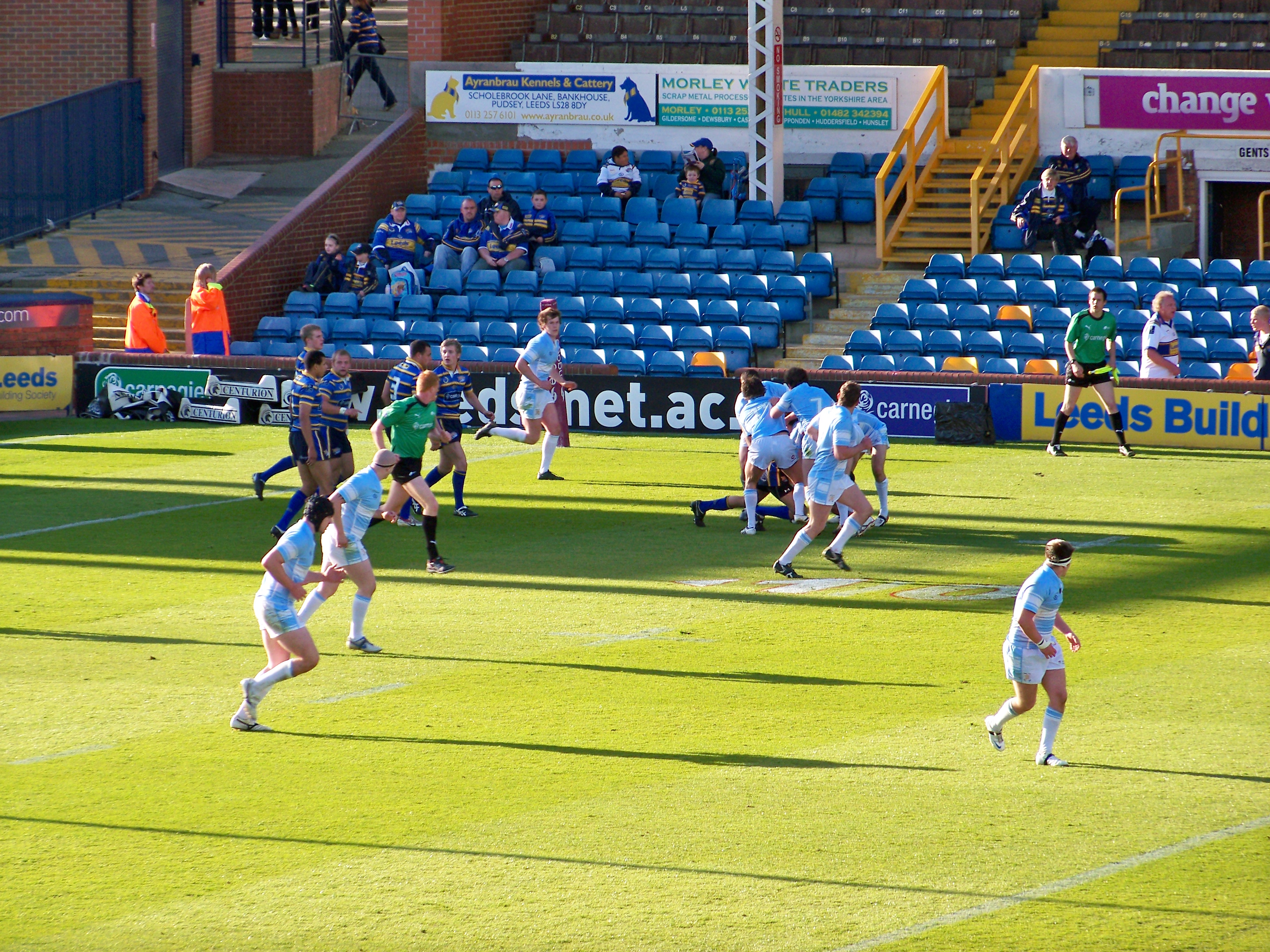
The Leeds Rhinos in action against Hull FC, May 2009.

- May 3 – Leeds' Magic Weekend fixture ends in a 16–36 win against Catalans
- May 15 – Leeds beat Castleford with the last kick of the match, a penalty conceded on 79:57 and converted after the hooter sounded.
- May 26 – Keith Senior scores twice in his 300th match for the Leeds Rhinos, who comfortably beat Hull FC at Headingley.

=== June ===
- June 6 – Leeds suffer only their second defeat at the hands of Catalans, going down 32–30 in Perpignan to a try awarded by the video referee after the full 80 minutes had elapsed.
- June 14 – Leeds regain second place in the table after beating Huddersfield.

=== July ===
- July 4 – Keith Senior plays and scores in his 500th professional match, away at Hull FC.
- July 17 – Leeds come from behind against Hull KR to end the weekend level on points at the top of the table with St Helens.

=== August ===
- August 14 – Leeds become the first team to score 70 or more points in Super League XIV, beating Castleford 76 – 12.

=== September ===
- September 4 – Rhinos beat St Helens 18–10 to go two points clear at the top of the table.
- September 11 – Leeds beat Salford 30–24 to win the League Leaders' Shield for the first time since 2004.

=== October ===
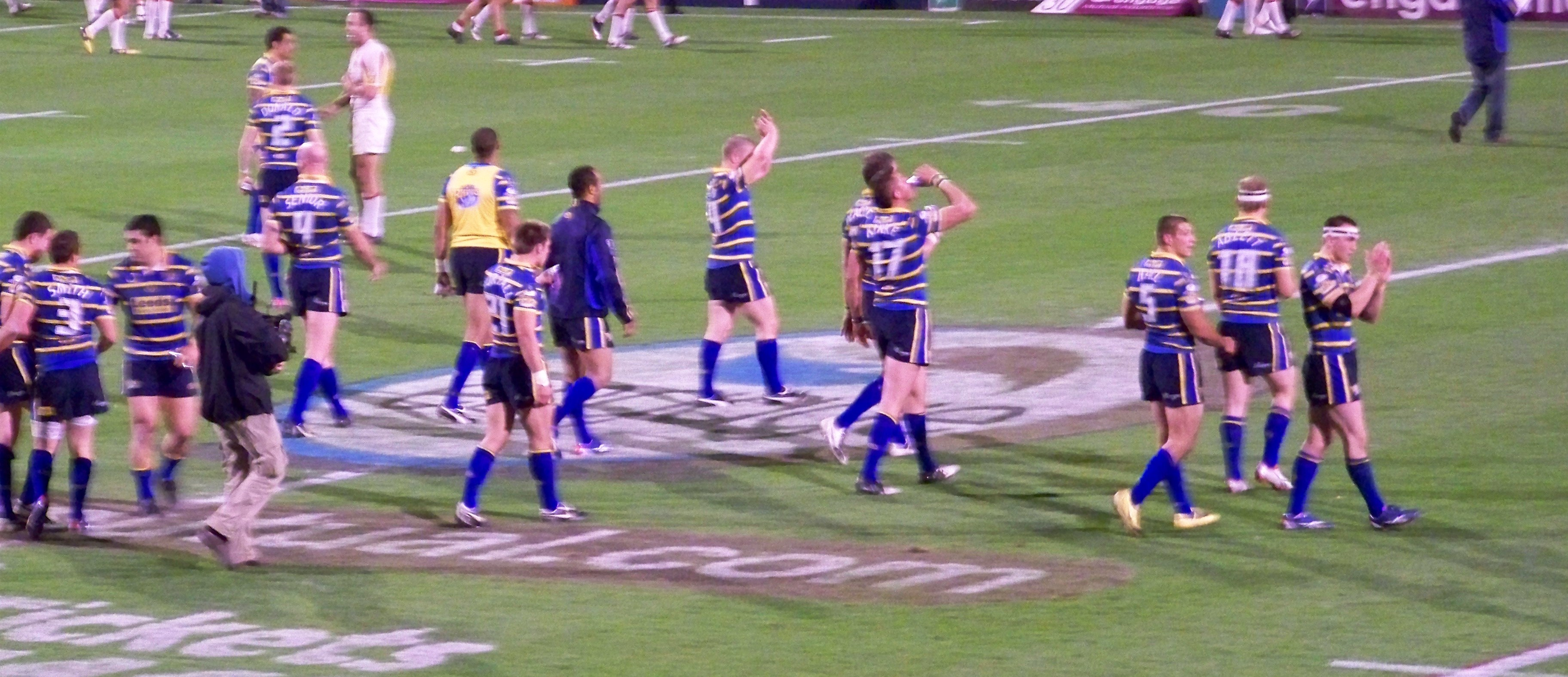
Leeds Rhinos leave the pitch victorious after progressing to the Superleague Grand Final.

- October 2 – Leeds Rhinos defeat Catalans Dragons 27–20 to progress to the Grand Final for the third year in a row.

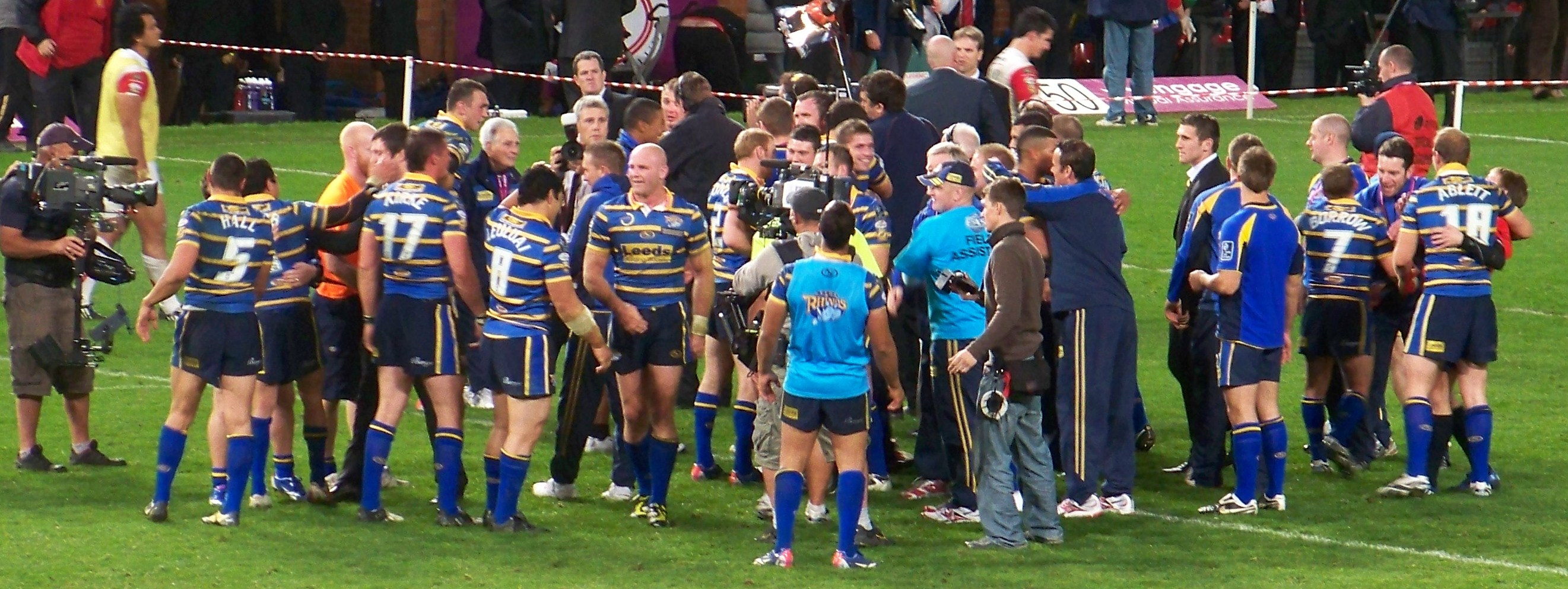
Leeds celebrate winning the 2009 Super League Grand Final

- October 10 – Leeds make history, being the first team to win three consecutive Super League Grand Finals, beating Saint Helens 18–10

== 2009 Squad ==
As of 7 April 2009

Nat	No	Player	Position	App	Tries	Goals	DG	Points
(New Zealand)	1	Brent Webb	Full-Back	1	0	0	0	0
(Australia)	2	Scott Donald	Wing	0	0	0	0	0
(England)	3	Lee Smith	Centre	0	0	0	0	0
(England)	4	Keith Senior	Centre	0	0	0	0	0
(England)	5	Ryan Hall	Wing	0	0	0	0	0
(England)	6	Danny McGuire	Stand-off	0	0	0	0	0
(England)	7	Rob Burrow	Scrum-Half	0	0	0	0	0
(Samoa)	8	Kylie Leuluai	Prop	0	0	0	0	0
(Australia)	9	Danny Buderus	Hooker	0	0	0	0	0
(England)	10	Jamie Peacock	Prop	0	0	0	0	0
(England)	11	Jamie Jones-Buchanan	Second-Row	0	0	0	0	0
(Samoa)	12	Ali Lauitiiti	Second-Row	0	0	0	0	0
(England)	13	Kevin Sinfield (C)	Loose-Forward	0	0	0	0	0
(England)	14	Matt Diskin	Hooker	0	0	0	0	0
(Fiji)	15	Michael Ratu	Centre	0	0	0	0	0
(Jamaica)	16	Ryan Bailey	Prop	0	0	0	0	0
(England)	17	Ian Kirke	Second-Row	0	0	0	0	0
(England)	18	Carl Ablett	Second-Row	0	0	0	0	0
(England)	19	Luke Burgess	Prop	0	0	0	0	0
(England)	20	Ashley Gibson	Centre	0	0	0	0	0
(England)	21	Simon Worrall	Second Row	0	0	0	0	0
(England)	22	Danny Allan	Loose forward	0	0	0	0	0
(England)	23	Kallum Watkins	Centre	0	0	0	0	0
(England)	24	Ben Jones-Bishop	Full back	0	0	0	0	0
(England)	26	Paul McShane	Hooker	0	0	0	0	0
(Republic of Ireland)	27	Luke Ambler	Prop	0	0	0	0	0

== 2009 Player Signings/Transfers ==
Gains

Player	Previous club	Years signed	Until the end of
Danny Buderus	Newcastle Knights	2 years	
Luke Ambler	Salford City Reds	3 Years	

Losses

Player	Future Club	Years signed	Until the end of
Nick Scruton	Bradford Bulls	3 Years	
Clinton Toopi	Bay of Plenty Steamers (Rugby Union)	Released	
Ben Kaye	Harlequins RL	3 years	
Jordan Tansey	Sydney Roosters	2 Year Loan	
Danny Williams	Newcastle Falcons Rugby Union	2 years	
Michael Haley	Doncaster Dragons	1 year	
Jordan Tansey	Hull F.C.		

== Coaching Set-Up ==
Nationality	Staff Name	Position
(New Zealand)	Brian McClennan	Head coach
(England)	Francis Cummins	Assistant Coach
(Samoa)	Willie Poching	Assistant Coach
(England)	Barrie McDermott	Head of Youth Development
(Slovakia)	Aleks Gross	Match Analyst
(England)	Billy Watts	Time-Keeper
(England)	Jason Davidson	Head Conditioner
(Wales)	Meirion Jones	Head Physiotherapist
(England)	Rob Wilson	Masseur

== 2009 Results ==
Date	Competition	Round	Home	Score	Away	Result	Venue	Referee	Attendance	Notes
26/12/2008	Friendly	N/A	Leeds Rhinos	16–22	Wakefield Trinity Wildcats	L	Headingley	Matthew Thomason	8,143	2008 Boxing Day friendly
19/01/2009	Friendly	N/A	Leeds Rhinos	12–10	Salford City Reds	W	Hodges Stadium	Ben Thaler		Friendly held in Jacksonville, Florida.
26/01/2009	Friendly	N/A	Leeds Rhinos	16–20	Hull FC	L	Headingley	Gareth Hewer	5,329	Jamie Jones-Buchanan's testimonial game
06/02/2009	Super League XIV	3	Leeds Rhinos	28–6	Crusaders	W	Headingley	Ben Thaler	14,827	Round 3 played before round 1 to accommodate World Club Challenge fixture on Round 3 weekend
13/02/2009	Super League XIV	1	Leeds Rhinos	18–4	Wakefield Trinity Wildcats	W	Headingley	Steve Ganson	15,643	
20/02/2009	Super League XIV	2	Hull Kingston Rovers	10–19	Leeds Rhinos	W	Craven Park	Phil Bentham	8,623	
01/03/2009	2009 World Club Challenge	N/A	Leeds Rhinos	20–28	Manly-Warringah Sea Eagles	L	Elland Road	Jason Robinson	32,569	
08/03/2009	Super League XIV	4	Warrington Wolves	14–20	Leeds Rhinos	W	Halliwell Jones Stadium	Steve Ganson	9,863	
13/03/2009	Super League XIV	5	Leeds Rhinos	34–10	Wigan Warriors	W	Headingley	Ian Smith	17,677	
20/03/2009	Super League XIV	6	St Helens R.F.C.	26–18	Leeds Rhinos	L	GPW Recruitment Stadium	Phil Bentham	13,966	
27/03/2009	Super League XIV	7	Leeds Rhinos	42–14	Catalans Dragons	W	Headingley	Ben Thaler	13,425	
05/04/2009	2009 Challenge Cup	4	Leeds Rhinos	18–22	St Helens RLFC	L	Headingley	Phil Bentham	17,689	
10/04/2009	Super League XIV	8	Bradford Bulls	10–6	Leeds Rhinos	L	Grattan Stadium	Ian Smith	14,554	
13/04/2009	Super League XIV	9	Leeds Rhinos	20–30	Salford City Reds	L	Headingley	James Child	14,381	
18/04/2009	Super League XIV	10	Huddersfield Giants	4–34	Leeds Rhinos	W	Galpharm Stadium	Richard Silverwood	11,593	
24/04/2009	Super League XIV	11	Leeds Rhinos	4–21	Harlequins RL	L	Headingley	Steve Ganson	13,912	
03/05/2009	Super League XIV	12	Catalans Dragons	16–36	Leeds Rhinos	W	Murrayfield Stadium	Thierry Alibert	30,122*	Magic Weekend fixture
15/05/2009	Super League XIV	13	Castleford Tigers	22–24	Leeds Rhinos	W	The Jungle	Ian Smith	8,082	
26/05/2009	Super League XIV	14	Leeds Rhinos	46–16	Hull FC	W	Headingley	Thierry Alibert	15,929	
06/06/2009	Super League XIV	15	Catalans Dragons	32–30	Leeds Rhinos	L	Stade Gilbert Brutus	Steve Ganson	7,913	
14/06/2009	Super League XIV	16	Leeds Rhinos	20–12	Huddersfield Giants	W	Headingley	Thierry Alibert	14,934	
20/06/2009	Super League XIV	17	Harlequins RL	14–48	Leeds Rhinos	W	Twickenham Stoop	Ian Smith	4,378	
26/06/2009	Super League XIV	18	Leeds Rhinos	33–20	Bradford Bulls	W	Headingley	Phil Bentham	17,824	
04/07/2009	Super League XIV	19	Hull FC	30–43	Leeds Rhinos	W	KC Stadium	Ian Smith	11,780	
10/07/2009	Super League XIV	20	Wakefield Trinity Wildcats	30–32	Leeds Rhinos	W	Belle Vue	Steve Ganson	6,425	
17/07/2009	Super League XIV	21	Leeds Rhinos	24–12	Hull Kingston Rovers	W	Headingley	Ben Thaler	16,192	
24/07/2009	Super League XIV	22	Wigan Warriors	28–10	Leeds Rhinos	L	JJB Stadium	Phil Bentham	20,295	
01/08/2009	Super League XIV	23	Leeds Rhinos	24–22	Warrington Wolves	W	Headingley	Ian Smith	13,386	
14/08/2009	Super League XIV	24	Leeds Rhinos	76–12	Castleford Tigers	W	Headingley	Ben Thaler	16,931	
22/08/2009	Super League XIV	25	Celtic Crusaders	0–68	Leeds Rhinos	W	Brewery Field	Thierry Alibert	5,597	
04/09/2009	Super League XIV	26	Leeds Rhinos	18–10	St Helens RLFC	W	Headingley	Phil Bentham	19,997	
11/09/2009	Super League XIV	27	Salford City Reds	24–30	Leeds Rhinos	W	The Willows	Thierry Alibert	6,101	
18/09/2009	Super League XIV	QPO1	Leeds Rhinos	44–8	Hull Kingston Rovers	W	Headingley	Steve Ganson	11,220	
02/10/2009	Super League XIV	QSF1	Leeds Rhinos	27–20	Catalans Dragons	W	Headingley	Richard Silverwood	13,409	

* Aggregate attendance for second day of Magic Weekend.

== League table ==
Pos	Team	Pld	W	D	L	PF	PA	PD	Pts	Qualification
1	Leeds Rhinos (L, C)	27	21	0	6	805	453	+352	42	Play-offs
2	St Helens	27	19	0	8	733	466	+267	38	Play-offs
3	Huddersfield Giants	27	18	0	9	690	416	+274	36	Play-offs
4	Hull Kingston Rovers	27	17	1	9	650	516	+134	35	Play-offs
5	Wakefield Trinity Wildcats	27	16	0	11	685	609	+76	32	Play-offs
6	Wigan Warriors	27	15	0	12	659	551	+108	30	Play-offs
7	Castleford Tigers	27	14	0	13	645	702	−57	28	Play-offs
8	Catalans Dragons	27	13	0	14	613	660	−47	26	Play-offs
9	Bradford Bulls	27	12	1	14	653	668	−15	25	
10	Warrington Wolves	27	12	0	15	649	705	−56	24	
11	Harlequins	27	11	0	16	591	691	−100	22	
12	Hull F.C.	27	10	0	17	502	623	−121	20	
13	Salford City Reds	27	7	0	20	456	754	−298	14	
14	Celtic Crusaders	27	3	0	24	357	874	−517	6	

Source: Rugby League Project
Rules for classification: 1) Points; 2) Points difference; 3) Number of points scored;
(C) Champions; (L) League Leaders' Shield Winners
