= 2010 Leeds Rhinos season =

- Super League Rank: 4th
- Play-off result: Qualifying Semi Final
- Challenge Cup: Runners up
- World Club Challenge: Runners up
- 2010 record: Wins: 21; draws: 1; losses: 11
- Points scored: For: 903; against: 593

Team information
- Chairman: (England) Paul Caddick
- Head coach: (New Zealand) Brian McClennan
- Captain: (England) Kevin Sinfield
- Stadium: Headingley Stadium
- High attendance: 27,697 (v Melbourne Storm at Elland Road)
← 2009	List of seasons	2011 →

This article details the Leeds Rhinos rugby league football club's 2010 season. This is the fifteenth season of the Super League era.

== Pre Season ==
Win Draw Loss

Date	Rnd	Home	Score	Away	Venue	Attendance
26 Dec 2009	P1	Leeds Rhinos	32-12	Wakefield Trinity Wildcats	Headingley	8,797
17 Jan 2010	P2	Leeds Rhinos	12-10	Bradford Bulls	Headingley	5,759
24 Jan 2010	P3	Whitehaven	22-30	Leeds Rhinos	Recreation Ground	2,250

== World Club Challenge ==
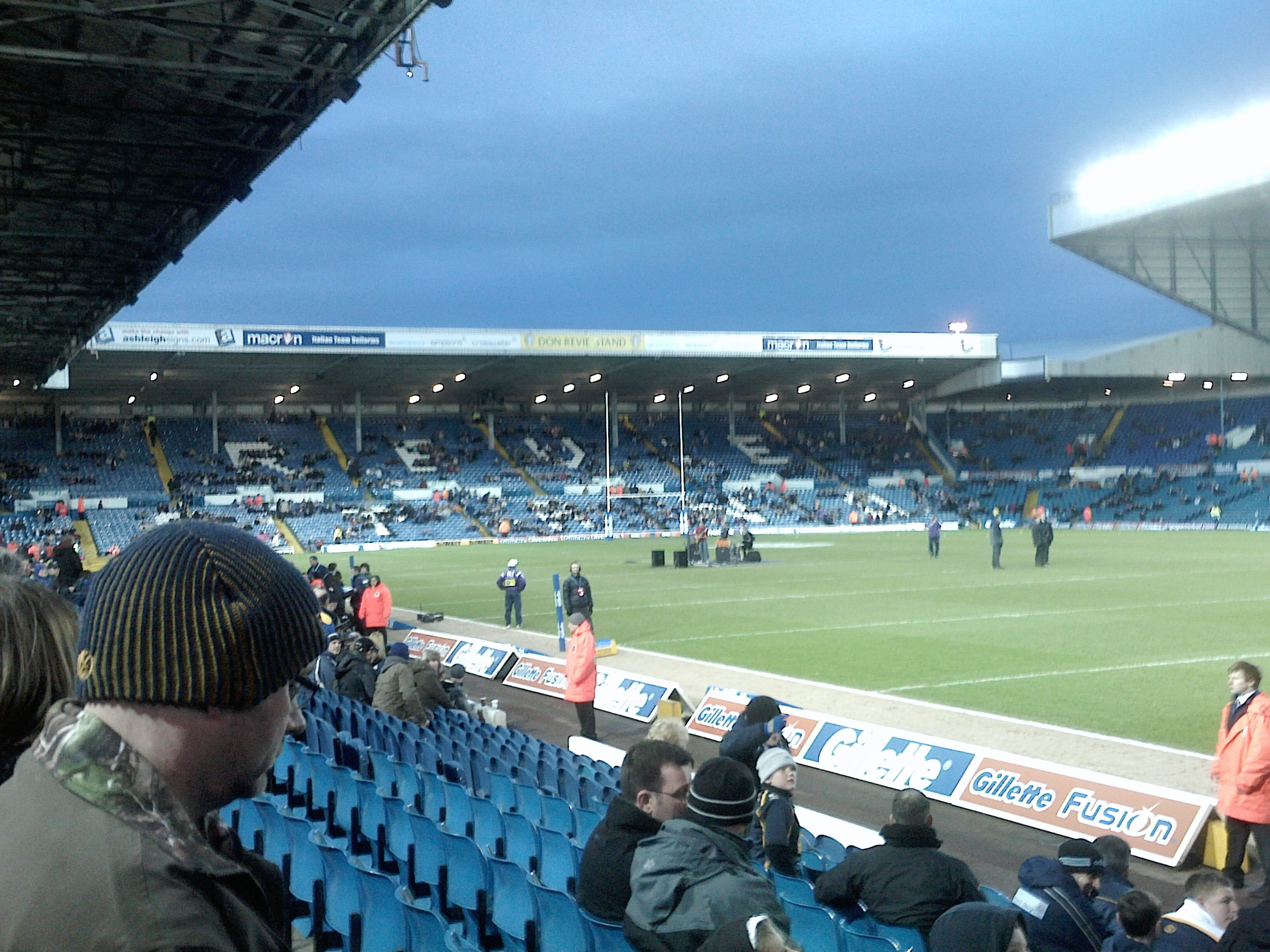
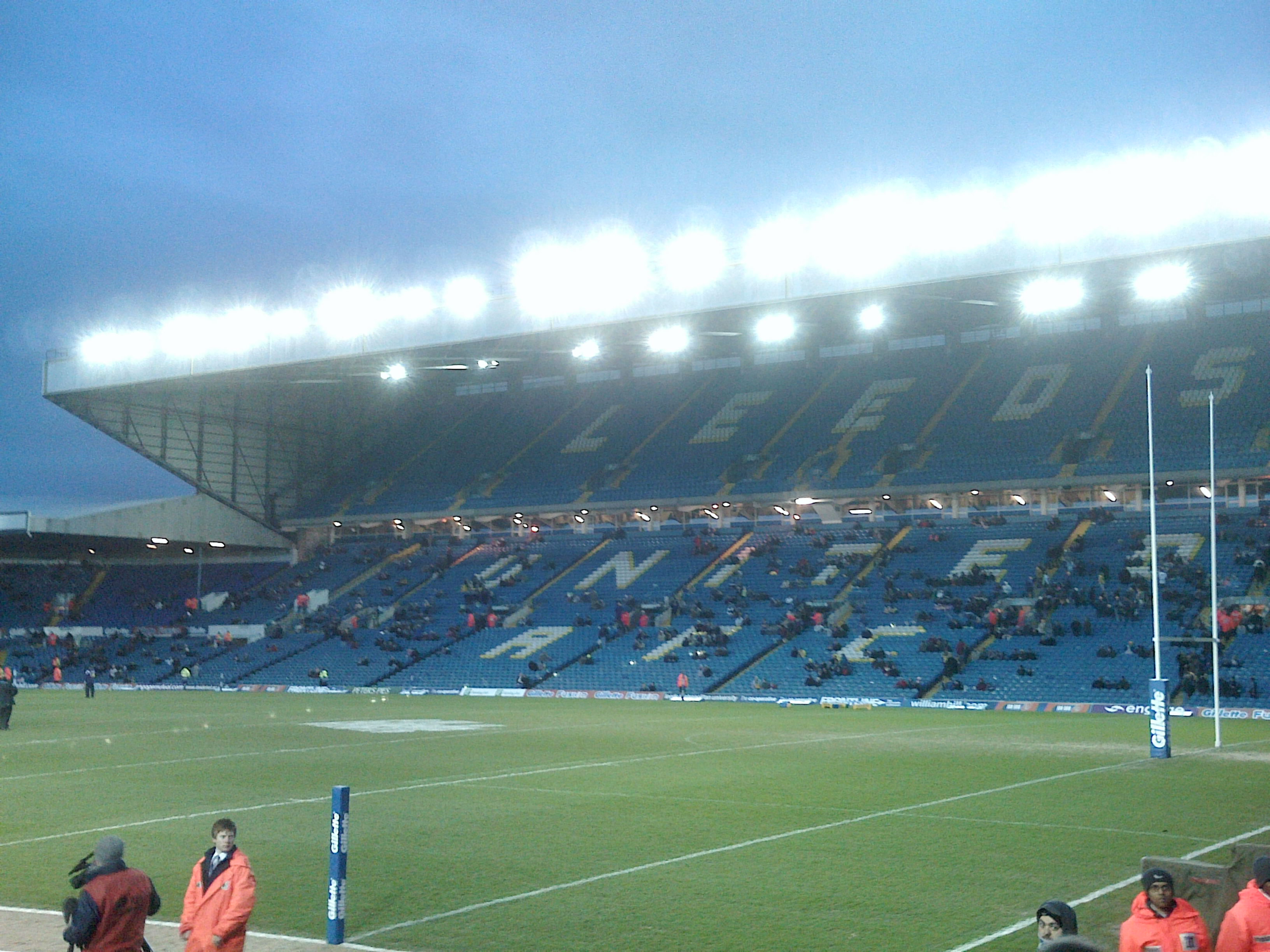
Leeds used Elland Road to host the 2010 World Club Challenge.

Date	Rnd	Home	Score	Away	Venue	Attendance
28 Feb 2010	WCC	Leeds Rhinos	10-18	Melbourne Storm	Elland Road	27,697

== Super League ==
=== Table ===
Pos	Team	Pld	W	D	L	PF	PA	PD	Pts	Qualification
1	Wigan Warriors (L, C)	27	22	0	5	922	411	+511	44	Play-offs
2	St Helens	27	20	0	7	946	547	+399	40	Play-offs
3	Warrington Wolves	27	20	0	7	885	488	+397	40	Play-offs
4	Leeds Rhinos	27	17	1	9	725	561	+164	35	Play-offs
5	Huddersfield Giants	27	16	1	10	758	439	+319	33	Play-offs
6	Hull F.C.	27	16	0	11	569	584	−15	32	Play-offs
7	Hull Kingston Rovers	27	14	1	12	653	632	+21	29	Play-offs
8	Celtic Crusaders	27	12	0	15	547	732	−185	24	Play-offs
9	Castleford Tigers	27	11	0	16	648	766	−118	22	
10	Bradford Bulls	27	9	1	17	528	728	−200	19	
11	Wakefield Trinity Wildcats	27	9	0	18	539	741	−202	18	
12	Salford City Reds	27	8	0	19	448	857	−409	16	
13	Harlequins	27	7	0	20	494	838	−344	14	
14	Catalans Dragons	27	6	0	21	409	747	−338	12	

Source: Rugby League Project
Rules for classification: 1) Points; 2) Points difference; 3) Number of points scored;
(C) Champions; (L) League Leaders' Shield Winners

=== Results ===
Date	Rnd	Home	Score	Away	Venue	Attendance
29 Jan 2010	4	Crusaders	6-34	Leeds Rhinos	Racecourse Ground	10,334
5 Feb 2010	1	Leeds Rhinos	10-24	Castleford Tigers	Headingley Stadium	15,875
14 Feb 2010	2	Wakefield Trinity Wildcats	28-18	Leeds Rhinos	Belle Vue	9,873
19 Feb 2010	3	Leeds Rhinos	22-10	Salford City Reds	Headingley Stadium	12,700
5 Mar 2010	5	Leeds Rhinos	62-4	Harlequins	Headingley Stadium	12,684
13 Mar 2010	6	Huddersfield Giants	26-20	Leeds Rhinos	Galpharm Stadium	10,116
19 Mar 2010	7	Leeds Rhinos	10-17	Hull Kingston Rovers	Headingley Stadium	15,201
26 Mar 2010	8	Wigan Warriors	24-4	Leeds Rhinos	DW Stadium	17,883
1 Apr 2010	9	Leeds Rhinos	20-20	Bradford Bulls	Headingley Stadium	17,234
5 Apr 2010	10	Catalans Dragons	24-34	Leeds Rhinos	Stade Gilbert Brutus	8,230
11 Apr 2010	11	Leeds Rhinos	46-30	Hull F.C.	Headingley Stadium	16,896
24 Apr 2010	12	St. Helens	41-20	Leeds Rhinos	Knowsley Road	11,048
1 May 2010	13	Wakefield Trinity Wildcats	30-34	Leeds Rhinos	Murrayfield	26,642
14 May 2010	14	Leeds Rhinos	26-16	Warrington Wolves	Headingley Stadium	16,733
23 May 2010	15	Bradford Bulls	12-26	Leeds Rhinos	Odsal	13,269
4 Jun 2010	16	Leeds Rhinos	28-22	Wakefield Trinity Wildcats	Headingley Stadium	13,869
12 Jun 2010	17	Harlequins	22-42	Leeds Rhinos	Twickenham Stoop	4,117
20 Jun 2010	18	Leeds Rhinos	26-32	Crusaders	Headingley Stadium	14,371
27 Jun 2010	19	Warrington Wolves	30-37	Leeds Rhinos	Halliwell Jones Stadium	10,442
3 Jul 2010	20	Leeds Rhinos	28-24	St. Helens	Headingley Stadium	17,200
9 Jul 2010	21	Hull Kingston Rovers	25-6	Leeds Rhinos	Craven Park	8,640
16 Jul 2010	22	Leeds Rhinos	21-20	Huddersfield Giants	Headingley Stadium	15,070
25 Jul 2010	23	Salford City Reds	22-31	Leeds Rhinos	The Willows	4,651
30 Jul 2010	24	Leeds Rhinos	12-26	Wigan Warriors	Headingley Stadium	16,622
13 Aug 2010	25	Castleford Tigers	6-38	Leeds Rhinos	The Jungle	7,901
13 Aug 2010	26	Leeds Rhinos	52-6	Catalans Dragons	Headingley Stadium	15,154
4 Sep 2010	27	Hull F.C.	14-18	Leeds Rhinos	KC Stadium	16,208

=== Play-offs ===
Date	Rnd	Home	Score	Away	Venue	Attendance
11 Sep 2010	QPO	Wigan Warriors	26-27	Leeds Rhinos	DW Stadium	12,117
24 Sep 2010	QSF	Leeds Rhinos	6-26	Wigan Warriors	Headingley Stadium	13,693

== Challenge Cup ==
Date	Rnd	Home	Score	Away	Venue	Attendance
17 Apr 2010	4th	Hull F.C.	24-48	Leeds Rhinos	KC Stadium	15,109
7 May 2010	5th	Leeds Rhinos	70-22	Blackpool Panthers	Headingley Stadium	5,316
29 May 2010	QF	Leeds Rhinos	12-10	Wigan Warriors	Headingley Stadium	9,242
7 Aug 2010	SF	Leeds Rhinos	32-28	St. Helens	Galpharm Stadium	15,267
30 Aug 2010	Final	Warrington Wolves	30-6	Leeds Rhinos	Wembley Stadium	85,217

== 2010 Squad ==
2010 Leeds Rhinos season
First team squad			Coaching staff
1 Brent Webb – FB; 2 Scott Donald – WG; 3 Brett Delaney – CE; 4 Keith Senior – CE; 5 Ryan Hall – WG; 6 Danny McGuire – SO; 7 Rob Burrow – SH; 8 Kylie Leuluai – PR; 9 Danny Buderus – HK; 10 Jamie Peacock (vc) – PR; 11 Jamie Jones-Buchanan – SR; 12 Ali Lauitiiti – SR; 13 Kevin Sinfield (c) – LF	14 Matt Diskin – HK; 15 Greg Eastwood – SR; 16 Ryan Bailey – PR; 17 Ian Kirke – SR; 18 Carl Ablett – SR; 19 Luke Burgess – PR; 20 Jay Pitts – PR; 21 Kyle Amor – SR; 22 Michael Coady – CE; 23 Kallum Watkins – CE	24 Luke Ambler – PR; 25 Paul McShane – HK; 28 Lee Smith – CE	Head coach: Brian McClennan; Assistant coach: Francis Cummins; Legend: (c) Captain(s); (vc) Vice-captain(s)

== 2010 transfers in/out ==
Gains

Player	Previous club	Years signed	Until the end of
Brett Delaney	Gold Coast Titans		
Greg Eastwood	Canterbury Bulldogs	3 years	2012
Jay Pitts	Wakefield Trinity Wildcats		
Kyle Amor	Whitehaven		
Michael Coady	Doncaster		
Luke Ambler	Salford City Reds		
Lee Smith	Wasps (Rugby Union)	4 years	2014

Losses

Player	Future Club	Years signed	Until the end of
Lee Smith	Wasps (Rugby Union)		
Michael Ratu	Hull Kingston Rovers		
Ashley Gibson	Salford City Reds		
Simon Worrall	Toulouse Olympique	1 Year Loan	2010
Danny Allan	Released		
Ben Jones-Bishop	Harlequins RL	1 Year Loan	2010
