= 2007 Super League Grand Final =

| St. Helens | Leeds Rhinos |
|---|---|
| 6 | 33 |
| | 1 | 2 | Total |
|---|---|---|---|
| ST H | 6 | 0 | 6 |
| LEE | 8 | 25 | 33 |
- Date: 13 October 2007
- Stadium: Old Trafford
- Location: (England) Manchester
- Harry Sunderland Trophy: (England) Rob Burrow ( Leeds Rhinos)
- Headliners: Kaiser Chiefs
- Referee: Ashley Klein
- Attendance: 71,352

Broadcast partners
- Broadcasters: Sky Sports
- Commentators: Eddie Hemmings; Mike Stephenson

The 2007 Super League Grand Final was tenth official grand final and the conclusive and championship-deciding match of the Super League XII season. Held on Saturday 13 October 2007, at Old Trafford in Manchester, the game was played between St. Helens, who finished top of the league after the 27 weekly rounds, and Leeds Rhinos, who finished second after the weekly rounds.

== Background ==
Going into this game, St Helens had never lost in a Grand Final - they had won in 1999, 2000, 2002 and 2006. Leeds Rhinos had one win from 2004 and two losses (1998 and 2005).

The St Helens stand-off, Leon Pryce, made a record-breaking seventh Grand Final appearance by playing in this game with previous appearances playing with Bradford Bulls and St Helens.

The pre-match coin toss was won by Leeds Rhinos. They chose to kick off and defended from the Stretford End of Old Trafford.

Katherine Jenkins was forced to withdraw herself from the pre-match entertainment due to a flu bug, her replacement was Russell Watson, who performed the Grand Final hymn, Jerusalem. Watson performed before the game at the first Super League Grand Final.

| | Team | Pld | W | D | L | PF | PA | PD | Pts |
|---|---|---|---|---|---|---|---|---|---|
| 1 | St. Helens | 27 | 19 | 0 | 8 | 783 | 422 | +361 | 38 |
| 2 | Leeds Rhinos | 27 | 18 | 1 | 8 | 747 | 487 | +260 | 37 |

=== Route to the Final ===
==== St Helens ====
| Round | Opposition | Score |
|---|---|---|
| Qualifying Semi-Final | Leeds Rhinos (H) | 10-8 |
Key: (H) = Home venue; (A) = Away venue; (N) = Neutral venue.

==== Leeds Rhinos ====
| Round | Opposition | Score |
|---|---|---|
| Qualifying Semi-Final | St Helens (A) | 10-8 |
| Elimination Final | Wigan Warriors (H) | 36-6 |
Key: (H) = Home venue; (A) = Away venue; (N) = Neutral venue.

== Match details ==
13 October 2007
18:00 UTC+1

| St. Helens | 6 - 33 | Leeds Rhinos |
|---|---|---|
| Tries: Roby 26'; Goals: Long | Report | Tries: Webb 19'; Lauitiiti 50'; Donald 52'; Smith 69'; Jones-Buchanan 79'; Goals: Sinfield (6); Drops: Burrow |

Old Trafford, Manchester
Attendance: 71,352
Referee: Ashley Klein (Australia)

| St Helens | | Position | Leeds Rhinos | |
|---|---|---|---|---|
| 1 | (England) Paul Wellens | Fullback | 1 | (Australia) Brent Webb |
| 2 | (England) Ade Gardner | Winger | 2 | (Australia) Scott Donald |
| 3 | (Australia) Matthew Gidley | Centre | 3 | (New Zealand) Clinton Toopi |
| 4 | (Samoa) Willie Talau | Centre | 4 | (England) Keith Senior |
| 5 | (Samoa) Francis Meli | Winger | 5 | (England) Lee Smith |
| 6 | (England) Leon Pryce | Stand Off | 6 | (England) Danny McGuire |
| 7 | (England) Sean Long | Scrum half | 7 | (England) Rob Burrow |
| 8 | (England) Nick Fozzard | Prop | 8 | (New Zealand) Kylie Leuluai |
| 9 | (Wales) Keiron Cunningham | Hooker | 9 | (England) Matt Diskin |
| 10 | (Australia) Jason Cayless | Prop | 10 | (England) Jamie Peacock |
| 11 | (England) Lee Gilmour | 2nd Row | 11 | (England) Jamie Jones-Buchanan |
| 30 | (Australia) Chris Flannery | 2nd Row | 12 | (England) Gareth Ellis |
| 12 | (England) Jon Wilkin | Loose forward | 13 | (England) Kevin Sinfield (c) |
| 14 | (England) James Roby | Interchange | 14 | (New Zealand) Ali Lauitiiti |
| 15 | (England) Mike Bennett | Interchange | 16 | (England) Ryan Bailey |
| 17 | (England) James Graham | Interchange | 18 | (England) Ian Kirke |
| 23 | (Samoa) Maurie Fa'asavalu | Interchange | 22 | (England) Carl Ablett |
| | (Australia) Daniel Anderson | Coach | | (Australia) Tony Smith |
