= 2011 Leeds Rhinos season =

- Super League XVI Rank: 5th
- Play-off result: Champions
- Challenge Cup: Runners-up
- 2011 record: Wins: 23; draws: 1; losses: 12
- Points scored: For: 757; against: 603

Team information
- Chairman: Paul Caddick
- Head coach: Brian McDermott
- Captain: Kevin Sinfield
- Stadium: Headingley Stadium

Top scorers
- Tries: Ryan Hall (32)
- Goals: Kevin Sinfield (160)
- Points: Kevin Sinfield (330)
← 2010	List of seasons	2012 →

This article details the Leeds Rhinos rugby league football club's 2011 season. This is the sixteenth season of the Super League era.

== Season review ==
=== Key Dates ===
==== February ====
- 13 February

Leeds beat local rivals Bradford Bulls 32–28 at Millennium Stadium with 4 tries in the last 18 minutes. Including a hat trick from Ben Jones Bishop with the hat trick coming from a penalty try in the 78th Minute.

- 16 February

Leeds "Fantastic Four" Kallum Watkins, Ben Jones Bishop, Ryan Hall and Chris Clarkson all sign 4 Year Contracts with the club.

- 18 February

Leeds Rhinos beat Hull F.C. 32–18 at the KC Stadium, with a 70-yard finish from Ben Jones Bishop potentially an early contender for try of the season.

- 24 February

Kevin Sinfield became a Rhino For Life, signing a 4 Year contract. Keeping the Leeds Rhinos captain at the club until the end of 2014.

- 25 February

Leeds Rhinos lost their first game of the season to high flying Harlequins RL, 2 tries from Quins hooker Andy Ellis won them the game, despite a strong start by Leeds Rhinos.

==== March ====
- 5 March

Warrington Wolves overpowered a Leeds Rhinos team with only 2 first choice props available. Despite a strong start taking an 8-point lead the Wolves scored 28 points on the bounce, despite 3 late tries Leeds Rhinos lost 40–24.

- 11 March

The Rhinos managed to outclass a Salford side that started strongly taking a 6–0 lead. Leeds rallied and thanks to 2 tires from Carl Ablett, and classy performances from the likes of Kallum Watkins, Brent Webb, Rob Burrow and Kevin Sinfield winning the game 46–12. The only downside losing rising star Ben Jones Bishop with a dislocated shoulder. Brad Singleton also became Leeds Rhinos 50th Academy graduate to play for the club.

== Results ==
=== Pre-season ===
W Win D Draw L Loss

Pre-season results
Date	Round	Versus	H/A	Venue	Result	Score	Tries	Goals	Attendance	Report
26 December	Festive Challenge	Wakefield Trinity Wildcats	H	Headingley Stadium	W	40–22			12,015	

The pre-season also included the Lazenby Cup match against Hunslet Hawks in January and a match against York City Knights in February. Leeds fielded mainly unders-20s and reserve players for these matches.

=== Super League ===
==== Table ====
Pos	Team	Pld	W	D	L	PF	PA	PD	Pts	Qualification
1	Warrington Wolves (L)	27	22	0	5	1072	401	+671	44	Play-offs
2	Wigan Warriors	27	20	3	4	852	432	+420	43	Play-offs
3	St Helens	27	17	3	7	782	515	+267	37	Play-offs
4	Huddersfield Giants	27	16	0	11	707	524	+183	32	Play-offs
5	Leeds Rhinos (C)	27	15	1	11	757	603	+154	31	Play-offs
6	Catalans Dragons	27	15	1	11	689	626	+63	31	Play-offs
7	Hull Kingston Rovers	27	14	0	13	713	692	+21	28	Play-offs
8	Hull F.C.	27	13	1	13	718	569	+149	27	Play-offs
9	Castleford Tigers	27	12	2	13	664	808	−144	26	
10	Bradford Bulls	27	9	2	16	570	826	−256	20	
11	Salford City Reds	27	10	0	17	542	809	−267	20	
12	Harlequins	27	6	1	20	524	951	−427	13	
13	Wakefield Trinity Wildcats	27	7	0	20	453	957	−504	10 (Note: Wakefield deducted 4 points for entering administration.)	
14	Crusaders	27	6	0	21	527	857	−330	8 (Note: Crusaders deducted 4 points for entering administration.)	

Source: rugbyleagueproject.org
Rules for classification: 1) Points; 2) Points difference; 3) Number of points scored;
(C) Champions; (L) League Leaders' Shield winners

==== Super League results ====
W Win D Draw L Loss

Super League results
Date	Round	Versus	H/A	Venue	Result	Score	Tries	Goals	Attendance	Report
13 February	1	Bradford Bulls	N (Note: Magic Weekend)	Millennium Stadium	W	32–28	Jones-Bishop (3), Hall, Burrow, Leuluai	Sinfield (4/7)	29,323	
18 February	2	Hull F.C.	A	KC Stadium	W	32–18	Jones-Bishop, Hall, Burrow, Hauraki, Webb, Clarkson	Sinfield (3 + DG), Burrow (DG)	12,513	
25 February	3	Harlequins RL	H	Headingley Stadium	L	26–36	Clarkson, Sinfield, Hall, Smith, Jones-Buchanan	Sinfield (3)	14,350	
5 March	4	Warrington Wolves	A	Halliwell Jones Stadium	L	24–40	Hall (2), Watkins, Webb	Sinfield (4/5)	11,438	
11 March	5	Salford City Reds	H	Headingley Stadium	W	46–12	Ablett (2), Hauraki, Jones-Buchanan, Lauiti'iti, Senior, Watkins, Webb	Sinfield (7)	13,068	
19 March	6	St Helens	H	Headingley Stadium	L	16–30	Hall, Hardaker, McShane	Sinfield (2)	16,034	
27 March	7	Wakefield Trinity Wildcats	A	Rapid Solicitors Stadium	W	28–6	Watkins (4), Buderus	Sinfield (4)	8,763	
1 April	8	Wigan Warriors	H	Headingley Stadium	D	22–22	Buderus, Jones-Buchanan, Webb	Sinfield (5/5)	16,118	
9 April	9	Hull Kingston Rovers	A	Craven Park	L	28–38	Watkins (2), Hall, McShane, Smith	Sinfield (4)	8,673	
15 April	10	Huddersfield Giants	H	Headingley Stadium	L	6–38	Burrow	Sinfield	14,768	
21 April	11	Bradford Bulls	A	Odsal Stadium	W	30–22	Buderus, Hall, Jones-Buchanan, McShane, Senior	Sinfield (5)	19,275	
25 April	12	Crusaders	H	Headingley Stadium	W	34–16	Senior (2), Ablett, Burrow, Delaney, Leuluai	Sinfield (5)	14,165	
29 April	13	Castleford Tigers	A	The PROBIZ Coliseum	W	48–6	Hall (2), Burrow, Jones-Buchanan, Kirke, McGuire, McShane, Watkins	Sinfield (8)	9,860	
13 May	14	Catalans Dragons	H	Headingley Stadium	W	30–6	Hardaker (2), Burrow, Hall, Leuluai	Sinfield (5)	13,273	
27 May	15	Warrington Wolves	H	Headingley Stadium	L	6–42	Buderus	Sinfield	17,276	
3 June	16	St Helens	A	Stobart Stadium	L	16–42	Jones-Buchanan, Smith	Sinfield (4)	9,062	
12 June	17	Hull Kingston Rovers	H	Headingley Stadium	W	44–14	Hall (3), Delaney, Hardaker, Hauraki, McGuire, Smith	Sinfield (6)	13,669	
17 June	18	Crusaders	A	Racecourse Ground	W	12–7	Lauiti'iti, McGuire	Snifield (2)	3,035	
24 June	19	Bradford Bulls	H	Headingley Stadium	L	12–18	Hall, Jones-Buchanan	Sinfield (2)	18,095	
1 July	20	Wigan Warriors	A	DW Stadium	L	24–26	Hardaker (2), Jones-Bishop, Webb	Sinfield (4)	16,426	
10 July	21	Catalans Dragons	A	Stade Gilbert Brutus	L	18–38	Buderus, Hall, Jones-Buchanan	Sinfield (3)	10,688	
15 July	22	Hull F.C.	H	Headingley Stadium	W	20–0	Hall, Jones-Bishop, McGuire	Sinfield (4)	14,809	
29 July	23	Salford City Reds	A	The Willows	W	30–22	Bailey, Hall, McGuire, Smith, Webb	Sinfield (5)	4,024	
12 August	24	Castleford Tigers	H	Headingley Stadium	W	56–0	Burrow (2), Webb (2), Hall, Jones-Bishop, Jones-Buchanan, Lauiti'iti, McGuire, Watkins	Sinfield (6), Burrow (2)	15,156	
20 August	25	Harlequins RL	A	Twickenham Stoop	L	22–32	Burrow, Hall, McGuire, Pitts	Sinfield (3)	3,241	
2 September	26	Wakefield Trinity Wildcats	H	Headingley Stadium	W	64–20	Hall (3), McGuire (2), Ablett, Buderus, Jones-Bishop, Lauiti'iti, Peacock, Smith	Sinfield (10)	15,511	
11 September	27	Huddersfield Giants	A	Galpharm Stadium	W	31–24	Hall (2), Hardaker, Jones-Buchanan, Webb	Sinfield (5 + DG)	10,428	

==== Play-offs ====
W Win D Draw L Loss

Play-off results
Date	Round	Versus	H/A	Venue	Result	Score	Tries	Goals	Attendance	Report
18 September	EPO	Hull F.C.	H	Headingley Stadium	W	42–10	Bailey, Hauraki, Jones-Bishop, Jones-Buchanan, McGuire, Sinfield, Webb	Sinfield (7/8)	9,075	
23 September	PSF	Huddersfield Giants	A	Galpharm Stadium	W	34–28	Hardaker (3), Webb (2), Jones-Bishop	Sinfield (5)	7,872	
30 September	QSF	Warrington Wolves	A	Halliwell Jones Stadium	W	26–24	Hall (2), Ablett, Burrow	Sinfield (5/6)	12,074	
8 October	GF	St Helens	N	Old Trafford	W	32–16	Ablett, Burrow, Hall, Hardaker, Webb	Sinfield (6/7)	69,107	

=== Challenge Cup ===
W Win D Draw L Loss

Challenge Cup results
Date	Round	Versus	H/A	Venue	Result	Score	Tries	Goals	Attendance	Report
7 May	4	Crusaders	H	Headingley Stadium	W	30–20	Buderus, Burrow, Hall, McShane, Pitts	Sinfield (5/5)	10,954	
20 May	5	Harlequins RL	H	Headingley Stadium	W	40–20	Clarkson, Delaney, Hall, Hardaker, Jones-Buchanan, Lauiti'iti, Leuluai	Sinfield (6/8)	7,147	
24 July	QF	Hull F.C.	A	KC Stadium	W	38–22	Ablett (2), Jones-Bishop (2), Delaney, Lauiti'iti	Sinfield (7/8)	9,496	
6 August	SF	Castleford Tigers	A	Keepmoat Stadium	W	10–8	Watkins	Sinfield (3/3)	13,158	
27 August	F	Wigan Warriors	N	Wembley Stadium	L	18–28	Hall (2), Ablett, Jones-Bishop	Sinfield (1/4)	78,482	

== Players ==
=== 2011 squad ===
2011 Leeds Rhinos season
First team squad			Coaching staff
1 Brent Webb – FB; 2 Lee Smith – WG; 3 Brett Delaney – CE; 4 Keith Senior – CE; 5 Ryan Hall – WG; 6 Danny McGuire – SO; 7 Rob Burrow – SH; 8 Kylie Leuluai – PR; 9 Danny Buderus – HK; 10 Jamie Peacock (vc) – PR; 11 Jamie Jones-Buchanan – SR; 12 Carl Ablett – SR; 13 Kevin Sinfield (c) – LF	14 Ali Lauitiiti – SR; 15 Ben Cross – PR; 16 Ryan Bailey – PR; 17 Ian Kirke – SR; 18 Luke Burgess – PR; 19 Kallum Watkins – CE; 20 Weller Hauraki – SR; 21 Chris Clarkson – SR; 22 Jay Pitts – SR; 23 Ben Jones Bishop – FB; 24 Paul McShane – HK; 25 Kyle Amor – PR; 26 Michael Coady – CE	27 Zak Hardaker – FB; 28 Brad Singleton – SR; 29 Jared Stewart – SR; 30 Liam Hood – HK; 31 Callum Casey – SO	Head coach: Brian McDermott; Assistant coach: James Lowes; Legend: (c) Captain(s); (vc) Vice-captain(s)

=== 2011 Transfers in/out ===
Gains

Player	Previous club	Years signed	Date
Ben Cross	Newcastle Knights	2	October 2010
Zak Hardaker	Featherstone Rovers	5	October 2010
Ben Jones Bishop	Harlequins RL	Loan Return	
Weller Hauraki	Crusaders RL	3	November 2010
Rory Kettlewell	Wigan Warriors	2	December 2010

Losses

Player	Future Club	Years signed	Date
Greg Eastwood	Canterbury Bulldogs	3	October 2010
Scott Donald	Retired		
Matt Diskin	Bradford Bulls	3	October 2010
Dane Manning	Batley Bulldogs		
Zak Hardaker	Featherstone Rovers	Season Long Loan (Note: Hardaker was recalled from his loan spell in March 2011.)	2011
Tom Bush	York City Knights	1	November 2010
Luke Ambler	Harlequins RL	Season Long Loan	November 2010
Kyle Amor	Wakefield Trinity Wildcats	Loan	February 2011
Ben Cross	Released		June 2011

=== Player statistics ===
No.	Nat.	Player	Apps	Tries	Goals	DGs	Points
1	(New Zealand)	Brent Webb	30	13	0	0	52
2	(England)	Lee Smith	17	6	0	0	24
3	(Australia)	Brett Delaney	27	4	0	0	16
4	(England)	Keith Senior	16	4	0	0	16
5	(England)	Ryan Hall	35	32	0	0	128
6	(England)	Danny McGuire	22	10	0	0	40
7	(England)	Rob Burrow	34	12	2	1	53
8	(Samoa)	Kylie Leuluai	31	4	0	0	16
9	(Australia)	Danny Buderus	35	7	0	0	28
10	(England)	Jamie Peacock	23	1	0	0	4
11	(England)	Jamie Jones-Buchanan	34	12	0	0	48
12	(England)	Carl Ablett	31	9	0	0	36
13	(England)	Kevin Sinfield	36	2	160	2	330
14	(New Zealand)	Ali Lauitiiti	21	6	0	0	24
15	(Australia)	Ben Cross	10	0	0	0	0
16	(England)	Ryan Bailey	25	2	0	0	8
17	(England)	Ian Kirke	33	1	0	0	4
18	(England)	Luke Burgess	12	0	0	0	0
19	(England)	Kallum Watkins	17	11	0	0	44
20	(New Zealand)	Weller Hauraki	27	4	0	0	16
21	(England)	Chris Clarkson	29	3	0	0	12
22	(England)	Jay Pitts	13	2	0	0	8
23	(England)	Ben Jones-Bishop	19	13	0	0	52
24	(England)	Paul McShane	18	5	0	0	20
27	(England)	Zak Hardaker	15	12	0	0	48
28	(England)	Brad Singleton	1	0	0	0	0
32	(England)	George Elliot	1	0	0	0	0
