= 2009 World Club Challenge =

Intercontinental rugby league match

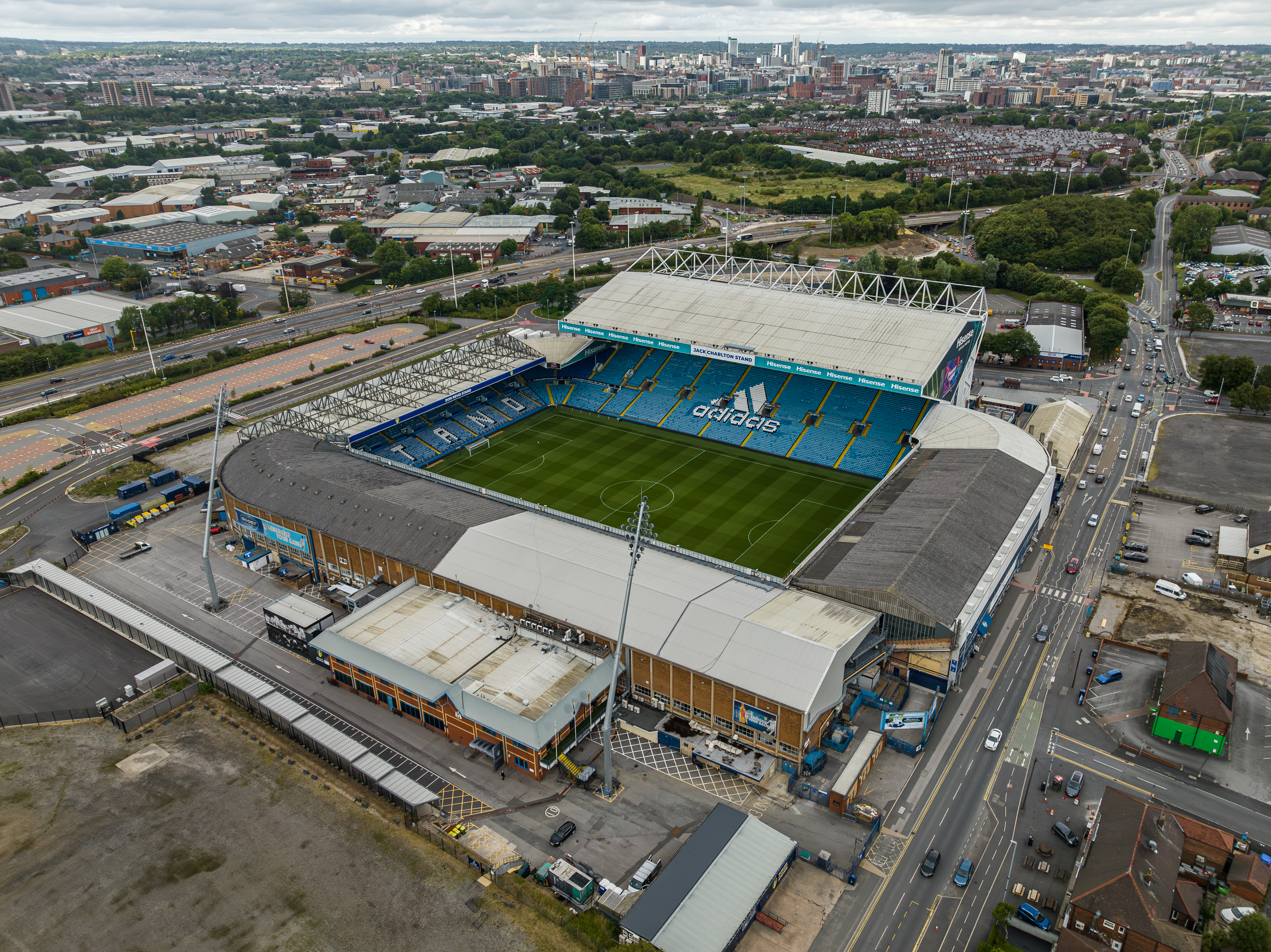
- Elland Road hosted the match
Leeds Rhinos	Manly Warringah Sea Eagles
(European SL)	(NRL)
20	28
	1	2	Total
LEE	4	16	20
MAN	12	16	28
- Date: 1 March 2009
- Stadium: Elland Road
- Location: Leeds, England
- Man of the Match: Anthony Watmough
- Referee: Jason Robinson (Australia)
- Attendance: 32,569

Broadcast partners
- Broadcasters: (United Kingdom) Sky Sports; (Australia) Fox Sports (Live) Nine Network (Delay)
- Commentators: Eddie Hemmings; Mike Stephenson; Brian Noble; Phil Clarke

The 2009 World Club Challenge was contested by Super League XIII champions, Leeds Rhinos, competing in their second consecutive World Club Challenge, and 2008 NRL Premiers, the Manly Warringah Sea Eagles. For the first time since 2003, the Australian champions defeated their English counterparts.

The match featured 28 penalties and two punch-ups which resulted in rival Props Josh Perry (Manly) and Jamie Peacock (Leeds) sin-binned in the 20th minute. with Manly's three quick tries in the first seven minutes after the break proving decisive. Leeds scored three tries of their own towards the end of the match, but by then it was too late.

== Qualification ==
=== Leeds Rhinos ===
Leeds Rhinos qualified through being the 2008 Super League champions, defeating St. Helens 24 - 16 in the Grand Final. The Yorkshire club had already completed their first three rounds of Super League XIV before contesting the world Club Challenge, with wins in all of them.

=== Manly Warringah Sea Eagles ===
The Manly Warringah Sea Eagles clinched the 2008 National Rugby League Premiership with a 40-0 thrashing of the Melbourne Storm - an Australian grand final record, earning them a place in the World Club Challenge. Five months later they travelled to England, while other NRL clubs were starting pre-season trial matches against one another. Showing how serious Manly were, the week before the World Club Challenge the Sea Eagles had a warm-up match against Super League club Harlequins RL at The Stoop in London, winning 34-26. Manly played the first half against the Harlequins with their bench players, and their regular starters only had the second half to work out any cobwebs as most had not played since either the Grand Final or the 2008 World Cup which had concluded four months before the WCC. It was the second time in a row a visiting team had played a warm-up match before the WCC with Melbourne having done so in 2008.

== Teams ==
Leeds Rhinos	Manly-Warringah

FB	3	Lee Smith
RW	2	Scott Donald
RC	18	Carl Ablett
LC	4	Keith Senior
LW	5	Ryan Hall
SO	6	Danny McGuire
SH	7	Rob Burrow
PR	8	Kylie Leuluai
HK	14	Matt Diskin
PR	10	Jamie Peacock
SR	11	Jamie Jones-Buchanan
SR	17	Ian Kirke
LF	13	Kevin Sinfield (c)
Substitutions:
IC	12	Ali Lauitiiti
IC	16	Ryan Bailey
IC	19	Luke Burgess
IC	23	Kallum Watkins
Coach:
(New Zealand) Brian McClennan

FB	1	Brett Stewart
LW	2	Michael Robertson
RC	3	Jamie Lyon
LC	4	Steve Matai
RW	5	David Williams
FE	6	Chris Bailey
HB	7	Matt Orford (c)
PR	8	Jason King
HK	9	Matt Ballin
PR	10	Josh Perry
SR	11	Anthony Watmough
SR	12	Glenn Hall
LK	13	Glenn Stewart
Substitutions:
IC	14	Heath L'Estrange
IC	15	Adam Cuthbertson
IC	16	George Rose
IC	18	Shane Rodney
Coach:
(Australia) Des Hasler

== Match details ==
The last time the Sea Eagles had played in England was in the 1987 World Club Challenge, a game their coach Des Hasler played in. They lost to Wigan that night and were hoping to win their first World Club title this time around. Leeds had played in the Challenge twice before, defeating their Australian counterparts on both occasions. After their victory over the Melbourne Storm the previous year, the Rhinos were hoping to become the first team in history to win consecutive titles.

Sunday 1 March
18:00 UTC+0

Leeds Rhinos	20 – 28	Manly Warringah Sea Eagles
Tries: Danny McGuire; Jamie Jones-Buchanan; Ryan Hall; Keith Senior; Goals: Kevin Sinfield (2/4)		Tries: Brett Stewart (2); Anthony Watmough (2); Steve Matai Goals: Matt Orford (4/6)

Elland Road, Leeds
Attendance: 32,569
Referee: Jason Robinson (Australia)
Player of the Match: Anthony Watmough

The first 20 minutes of the match were played from end to end in a very even contest. A legal tackle by Manly's Anthony Watmough in the 16th minute on Leeds' pint sized scrum-half Rob Burrow knocked him out and he played no further part in the match. In the 20th minute a brawl erupted, front rowers Jamie Peacock and Josh Perry the main combatants. Both players were sent to the sin-bin and a penalty awarded to Manly. Sea Eagles captain Matt Orford opted to attack Leeds' line and Brett Stewart broke through the defence from dummy half to score the first points just after a quarter of the match had passed. Orford converted the try so Manly had a 6–0 lead. Seven minutes later the Sea Eagles were again down in the Rhinos' half when Orford put a short ball onto the chest of a flying Anthony Watmough from 30 metres out to race through the defence and score (video replays suggested that Orford's pass to Watmough might have gone forward, but it was ruled ok by referee Jason Robinson). Orford's conversion pushed the Australian club's lead out to 12–0. Manly could have put the game beyond doubt seven minutes before half-time when Watmough charged onto a pass and broke through flimsy defence before popping a soft pass to a flying Brett Stewart who somehow managed to drop the ball with a try under the posts seemingly seconds away. In the 37th minute Leeds were just into Manly's half when they kicked ahead, regathered and got the ball to Danny McGuire who made it over the line but had the ball stripped from his grasp by Matt Orford in a one-on-one tackle before he could ground it. Jamie Jones-Buchanan was there to press the ball to the turf however, so the try was given by the video referee. Kevin Sinfield missed the relatively easy conversion, so Leeds were down 12–4. The score did not change during the remaining few minutes of the half.

Leeds started the 2nd half making a small break down the left hand side in the first minute after replacement Manly hooker Heath L'Estrange had given away a penalty. In the resulting play, McGuire got the ball to Ryan Hall who passed inside to Keith Senior who had the ball stripped on-on-one tackle by Jamie Lyon. The 2nd minute of play saw Manly make a break from the halfway line with Adam Cuthbertson getting the ball out to Michael Robertson on the left wing. Leeds winger (and former Manly player from 2003–05) Scott Donald attempted to tackle Robertson but he managed to get a pass away. Leeds centre Carl Ablett failed to gather the loose ball and managed to knock the ball straight into the waiting hands of Brett Stewart who had originally overrun the ball. The Manly fullback picked the ball up 12 metres out from the line and with no one to beat scored his second try of the night. Orford missed the conversion, and the score was 16–4 in favour of the visiting team. The Sea Eagles scored again one minute later as they were returning the ball from the kick-off. Michael Robertson made another break down the right wing and centre kicked ahead for Brett Stewart who got a perfect bounce. Stewart came close to scoring but was forced to swerve soon after gathering the ball by a converging Ryan Hall who was flying in off his wing. Hall finally brought the Manly fullback down just 10 metres from the Rhino's line. From dummy half the ball then went left to Watmough at first receiver before Leeds' defence could regather and he went over for his second try of the game. Orford kicked the extras so Manly had gotten away to a 22–4 lead. When returning the following kick-off as well the Sea Eagles scored again, this time Shane Rodney made a break 25 metres from his own line and got to the Leeds 40 metre line before finding L'Estrange in support who in turn popped a pass to Steve Matai who had an easy 20 metre run to the line (even had Matai been caught, he still had an un-marked Robertson in support). Manly had scored their 3rd try in only 6 minutes and 45 seconds of the second half which had taken the game away from Leeds and silenced the mostly pro-Rhinos crowd, though there were a few Manly supporters scattered throughout the stadium and a group of supporters had come from Sydney to watch the Sea Eagles with Sky Sports television commentator Eddie Hemmings telling the audience that his director was finding them in the crowd as he himself was an Australian and just happened to be a Manly-Warringah fan. Orford missed the conversion so the Manly lead was 26–4.

In the 64th minute, after Leeds got repeat sets of six down near Manly's line, they moved the ball from one side of the field out to the other, a quick no-look pass from Ali Lautiiti sending Keith Senior over the line. Sinfield kicked the extras so the Rhinos were down 26–10 with fifteen minutes remaining. After 71 and a half minutes, 30 metres out from Manly's line, Lautiiti made a run from dummy-half down the left side and threw another deft no-look pass to Ryan Hall who scored in the corner. Sinfield's kick from the sideline bounced through off one of the posts leaving the score at 26–16 with seven minutes of the match remaining. Another fight broke out in the 75th minute and again Leeds were penalised. The Sea Eagles opted to take the kick for goal, which Orford did successfully giving them a 28–16 lead. This made their lead 12 points with only 3 minutes remaining. Leeds got one more try in the final minute of the game, Keith Senior making a break from 60 metres out down the left wing before finding Danny McGuire in support to score in the corner just seconds before the final hooter. Sinfield's sideline conversion attempt was missed, so the Manly Warringah Sea Eagles had won the World Club Challenge for the first time, by a score of 28–20. Second-rower Anthony Watmough was named man-of-the-match.

== Significance ==
- Manly became the first Australian team in six years to win the World Club Challenge, since the Sydney Roosters defeated St Helens R.F.C. in 2003. They were also only the fourth side from Australia to have won a final on British soil in the history of the event.
- Manly won their first World Club Challenge at their second attempt having lost the 1987 World Club Challenge to Wigan 8-2.
- After failing to score a try in the 1987 WCC, the opening try of the game by Fullback Brett Stewart was Manly's first ever try in a World Cub Challenge.
- Failure to defend their World Club Challenge title from 2008 meant the Leeds Rhinos' first loss in the 2009 competitive season. They would have been the first club to have gained two consecutive titles had they won.
- Prop forward Josh Perry became the second Manly player to be sent from the field in a WCC when he was sin-binned for 10 minutes after a fight with opposing prop Jamie Peacock who was also binned for 10. Manly Second-rower "Rambo" Ronny Gibbs had been sent off for a high tackle on Wigan's Joe Lydon in the 1987 WCC.
- After Brett Stewart was suspended for four games by the NRL due to an indiscretion at Manly's 2009 NRL season launch, the World Club Champions went 0-4 to start their premiership defence. It was not until Stewart returned and scored 3 tries at Brookvale Oval against the Wests Tigers in Round 5 that Manly won their first game of the season.
- Leeds would win the next two games of their Super League season against Warrington and Wigan before suffering their first domestic loss of the season away to St. Helens.
- The Attendance of 32,569 was the largest for both clubs in 2009. Manly's largest NRL attendance was 27,527 for a Round 9 away clash with the Brisbane Broncos at Suncorp Stadium. Leeds largest attendance was 19,997 for the Round 26 match against St Helens at Headingley (Note: Leeds also played in front of 30,122 on Day 2 of the Round 12 Magic Weekend fixture featuring 7 other clubs on the day)

== See also ==
- 2009 Manly Warringah Sea Eagles season
- 2009 Leeds Rhinos season
