= Joe Chandler =

English rugby league footballer

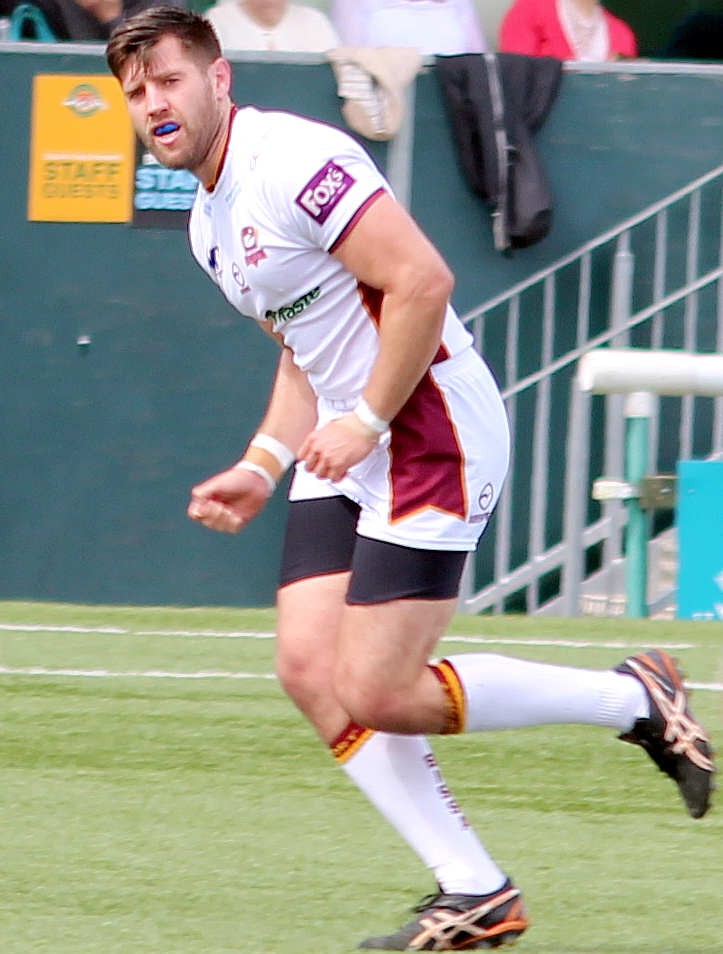

Personal information
- Full name: Joseph Chandler
- Born: 11 February 1988 (age 38) Dewsbury, West Yorkshire, England

Playing information
- Position: Prop
Club
Years	Team	Pld	T	G	FG	P
2008	Leeds Rhinos	1	0	0	0	0
2010	Oldham	28	12	0	0	0
2011–12	Halifax	25	11	0	0	44
2012(loan)	→ Dewsbury Rams	5	0	0	0	0
2013	Keighley Cougars	25	3	0	0	12
2014–18	Batley Bulldogs	101	9	0	0	36
2018(loan)	→ Hunslet	2	0	0	0	0
	Total	187	35	0	0	92
- Source: As of 1 June 2026

Joe Chandler (born 11 February 1988) is an English former professional rugby league footballer who has played in the 2000s and 2010s. He last played for the Batley Bulldogs in the Championship, as a prop.

== Background ==
Joe Chandler was born in Dewsbury, West Yorkshire, England. He played for the Churwell Chiefs, Shaw Cross Sharks and the Leeds Rhinos academy.

== Playing career ==
In 2008, Chandler made one Super League appearance for the Leeds Rhinos in an 18–12 victory over the Castleford Tigers.

Chandler joined Oldham ahead of the 2010 season.

In the 2011 season, Chandler joined Halifax where he scored eight tries in his first season at the club.

In June 2012, Chandler signed for the Dewsbury Rams initially on a one-month loan.

In November 2012, Chandler joined the Keighley Cougars. He left the club at the end of the season and signed for the Batley Bulldogs.

Chandler made his debut for Batley in February 2014 and went on to make 101 appearances for the club.
