= Michael Haley (rugby league) =

Ireland international rugby league footballer

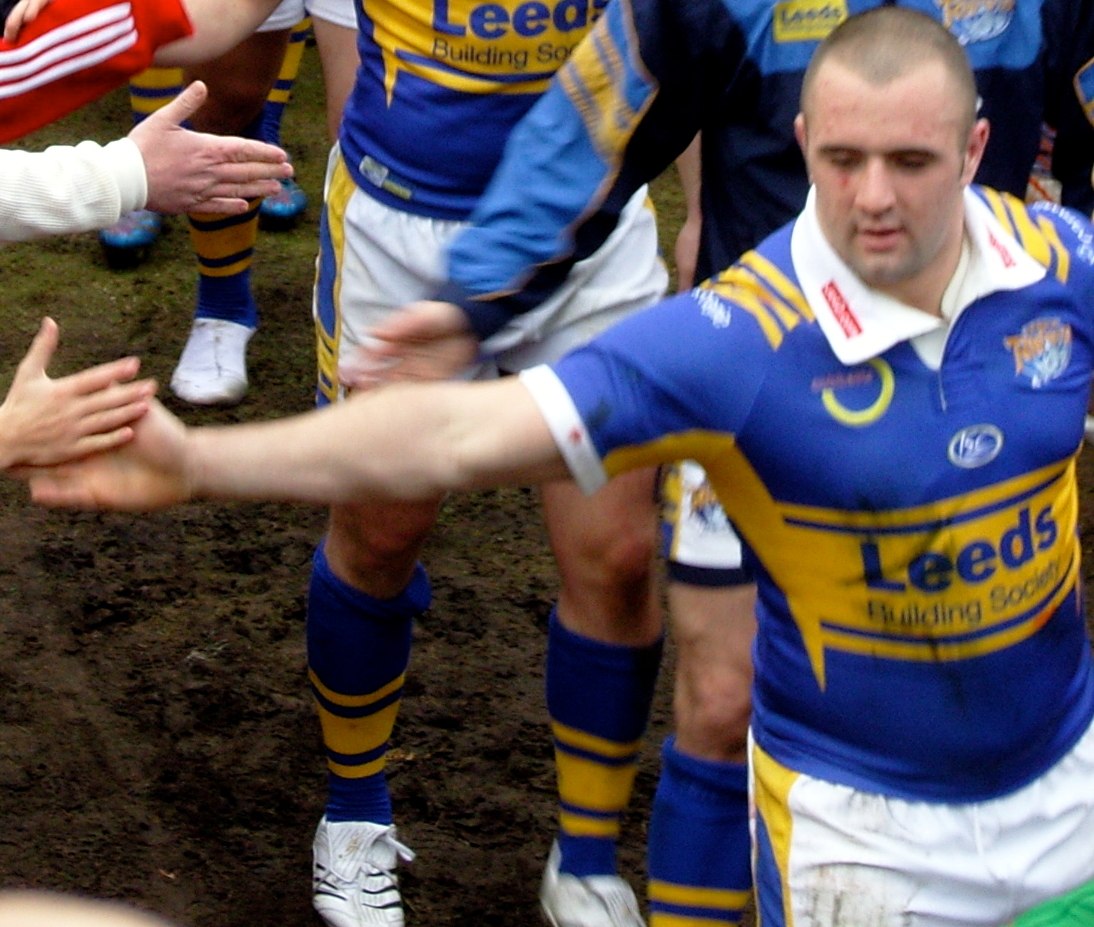

Personal information
- Born: 19 September 1987 (age 38) Leeds, West Yorkshire, England

Playing information
- Height: 5 ft 11 in (180 cm)
- Weight: 17 st 4 lb (110 kg)
- Position: Prop
Club
Years	Team	Pld	T	G	FG	P
2008	Leeds Rhinos	1	0	0	0	0
2008–09	Doncaster	30	3	0	0	12
2009–10	Sheffield Eagles	29	0	0	0	0
2011–12	Featherstone Rovers	33	3	0	0	12
2013–19	Hunslet	131	9	0	0	36
	Total	224	15	0	0	60
Representative
Years	Team	Pld	T	G	FG	P
2009–12	Ireland	4	0	0	0	0

Michael Haley (born 19 September 1987) is an English former rugby league footballer who played in the 2000s and 2010s. He has played at representative level for Ireland, and at club level for the Leeds Rhinos in the Super League, Doncaster, the Sheffield Eagles, Featherstone Rovers and Hunslet in League 1, as a prop.

== Background ==
Haley was born in Leeds, West Yorkshire, England, he has Irish ancestors, and eligible to play for Ireland due to the grandparent rule.

== Career ==
He has played for the Leeds Rhinos in the Super League. He plays as a prop. He transferred from the Sheffield Eagles to Featherstone Rovers during the winter of 2010, he suffered a severe injury to his knee in the Featherstone Rovers' win at Barrow, on 20 February 2011, returned just weeks later.
