= Danny Allan =

English rugby league footballer

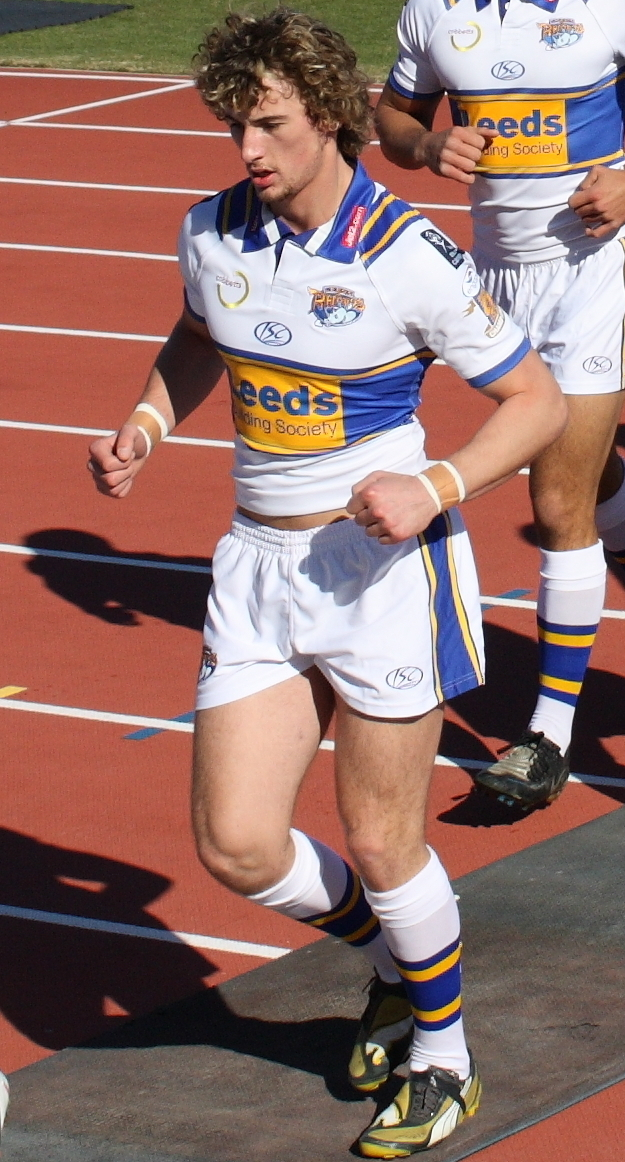

Personal information
- Full name: Danny Allan
- Born: 9 April 1989 (age 37) York, North Yorkshire, England
- Height: 6 ft 1 in (1.85 m)
- Weight: 18 st 8 lb (115kg)

Playing information
- Position: Stand-off
Club
| Years | Team | Pld | T | G | FG | P |
|---|---|---|---|---|---|---|
| 2008–09 | Leeds Rhinos | 9 | 0 | 0 | 0 | 0 |
| 2010–11 | Featherstone Rovers | 6 | 1 | 0 | 0 | 4 |
| 2010 | Doncaster | 6 | 3 | 0 | 0 | 12 |
| 2010 | York City Knights | 5 | 1 | 0 | 0 | 4 |
| 2012 | Hunslet Hawks | 6 | 1 | 2 | 0 | 8 |
| 2015–16 | Oxford | 23 | 3 | 17 | 0 | 46 |
| | Total | 55 | 9 | 19 | 0 | 74 |
- Source: As of 21 June 2016

Danny Allan (born 9 April 1989 in York, North Yorkshire, England) is a professional rugby league footballer who most recently played for Oxford Rugby League in League 1. He previously played for the York City Knights, the Hunslet Hawks, the Featherstone Rovers and Doncaster in the Championship, and for the Leeds Rhinos in the Super League. He plays as a stand-off.

== Playing career ==
He made his début for Leeds against Castleford 2007 at stand-off in place of Danny McGuire on international duties.
