= Kevin Sinfield =

English rugby player and coach (born 1980)

Sir; Kevin Sinfield; CBE
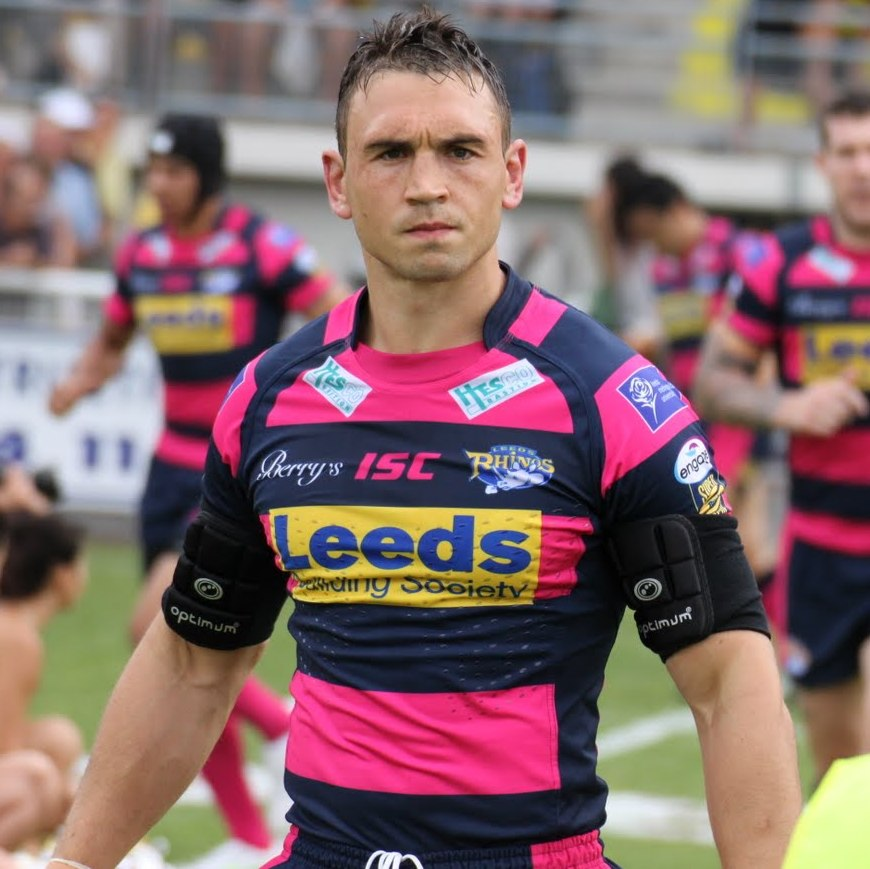

Personal information
- Full name: Kevin Sinfield
- Born: 12 September 1980 (age 46) Oldham, Greater Manchester, England

Playing information
- Height: 6 ft 1 in (1.85 m)
- Weight: 14 st 5 lb (91 kg)
- Position: Loose forward, Stand-off, Hooker
Club
Years	Team	Pld	T	G	FG	P
1997–15	Leeds Rhinos	521	86	1792	39	3967
Representative
Years	Team	Pld	T	G	FG	P
2000–13	England	29	5	91	0	202
2001	Lancashire	4	0	0	0	0
2001–07	Great Britain	14	1	15	0	34

Coaching information
Club
Years	Team	Gms	W	D	L	W%
2018	Leeds Rhinos	12	6	1	5	50

Rugby union career
- Position: Fly-half
Senior career
Years	Team	Apps	(Points)
2015–16	Yorkshire Carnegie	18	(122)
Coaching career
- Years: Team
- 2021–22: Leicester Tigers (defence coach)
- 2022–: England (defence coach)
- Correct as of 10 January 2026

Sir Kevin Sinfield (born 12 September 1980) is an English rugby union coach who is the skills and kicking coach for the England national team. He is a former professional rugby league footballer who played for the Leeds Rhinos, England and Great Britain. He played as a loose forward or stand-off and occasionally as a hooker.

Sinfield played his entire professional career with Leeds and is one of the most successful players in Super League history, having captained the team to seven Super League championships and two Challenge Cup successes. He also earned individual accolades as winner of the Lance Todd Trophy (2005), Harry Sunderland Trophy twice (2009, 2012) and the Golden Boot (2012), one of only five British-based players to win the latter. He holds records as the highest points-scorer in Super League history, the third-highest points-scorer in British rugby league history and Leeds' record points scorer. Sinfield is also only one of two players to have led a team to win three consecutive Super League titles.

He won 26 caps for England, which he captained, and 14 caps for Great Britain. Sinfield played rugby union for Leeds's sister club Yorkshire Carnegie in 2015-16 and retired from playing in 2016. Since retirement he has become one of British sport's most prominent charity fundraisers, raising over £11 million for causes associated with motor neurone disease, and in 2026 became only the second rugby league player ever to be knighted for services to the sport. (Note: Other former players have been knighted but not for services to rugby league. Glynn Hamilton West who played for Leeds in the early days of the Northern Union was knighted in 1916 for his services to the war effort. Billy Bulmer, another former England international was knighted in 1922 but his knighthood was "for public service". New Zealanders, Graham Lowe and Peter Leitch were knighted in 2013 and 2010 respectively but neither of these were directly for "services to rugby league".)

== Background ==
Sinfield was born in Oldham, Greater Manchester, England. He studied at Saddleworth School, where he was head boy, and Oldham Sixth Form College.

== Playing career ==
=== Rugby league ===
==== 1990s ====
Sinfield starting his playing career at Waterhead ARLFC. He signed for Leeds in August 1997 and made his first team début for Leeds aged 16 against the Sheffield Eagles, and made three further appearances during the 1997 and 1998 seasons, scoring his first try against the Huddersfield Giants in September 1998. 1999 was a breakthrough season for Sinfield, with 21 appearances and two tries. He was not selected for the 1999 Challenge Cup Final, when Leeds defeated the London Broncos.

==== 2000s ====
Sinfield was a member of the England squad for the 2000 Rugby League World Cup, scoring a hat-trick of tries in a 76–4 victory over Russia. During the 2001 Kangaroo tour he played for Great Britain in all three Ashes tests against Australia. Sinfield played for Leeds at stand-off in the 2003 Challenge Cup Final against Bradford Bulls, kicking four goals in his side's defeat. He played for Great Britain in the 2nd and 3rd Ashes Tests of the 2003 Kangaroo tour of Great Britain and France. He kicked four goals for Leeds in their 2004 Super League Grand Final victory against Bradford. As Super League IX champions, Leeds faced 2004 NRL season premiers, the Bulldogs in the 2005 World Club Challenge. Sinfield captained Leeds, kicking five goals and one drop goal in their 39–32 victory.

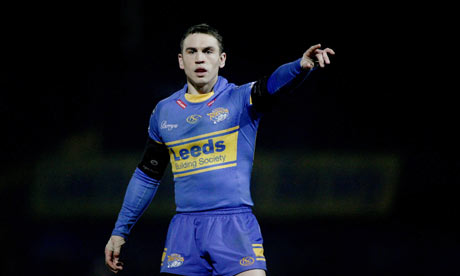
Sinfield playing for Leeds in 2010

Sinfield played for Leeds in the 2005 Challenge Cup Final, kicking four goals in their loss against Hull F.C., but was awarded the Lance Todd Trophy as man of the match nonetheless. He played at loose forward, kicking a goal in Leeds's 2005 Super League Grand Final loss against Bradford Bulls. He was also named in 2005's Super League Dream Team. Sinfield was selected to play for Great Britain in the end-of-season 2005 Tri-nations tournament. He was named in 2006's Super League Dream Team. In 2007, he became the first Leeds player to score in every round of a Super League season, a feat that he repeated in the 2011 season including kicking six out of seven goals in the Rhinos' fourth Grand final victory over St. Helens in five years. In the post-season Sinfield played for Great Britain against the 2007 All Golds Tourists.

Sinfield celebrated his testimonial season in 2008. He was man of the match, scoring seven points, as Leeds defeated Melbourne 11–4 at Elland Road. During the season Sinfield set a club record by scoring in 63 consecutive matches. He also set a Super League record by scoring in 52 consecutive Super League games. Sinfield scored his 2,000th point for the club as Leeds defeated St Helens for the second successive year in the 2008 Super League Grand Final. Leeds won 24–16, with Sinfield successfully kicking four goals. It was the first time Leeds had ever won back-to-back titles. It was also the first time that a Super League team had won both the World Club Challenge, and the Grand Final in the same calendar year. He was also selected for the England squad for the 2008 Rugby League World Cup tournament in Australia. In England's first match against Papua New Guinea he played at loose forward and kicked four goals from six attempts in England's victory. During the 2009 season, Sinfield became only the second player, after Lewis Jones, to score 1,000 goals for Leeds.

Sinfield capped the 2009 season by winning the Harry Sunderland Trophy for his performance as he led Leeds to victory in a third successive Grand Final. Leeds defeated St Helens 18–10, with Sinfield scoring six points, including a drop goal. With victory, Sinfield became the first player in history to captain four championship-winning teams. He dedicated the win at Old Trafford to the recently deceased former Leeds player John Holmes.

He played for England in the 2009 Four Nations tournament.

==== 2010s ====
Sinfield was selected to play for England against France in the one-off test in 2010.

He played in the 2010 Challenge Cup Final defeat by the Warrington Wolves at Wembley Stadium.

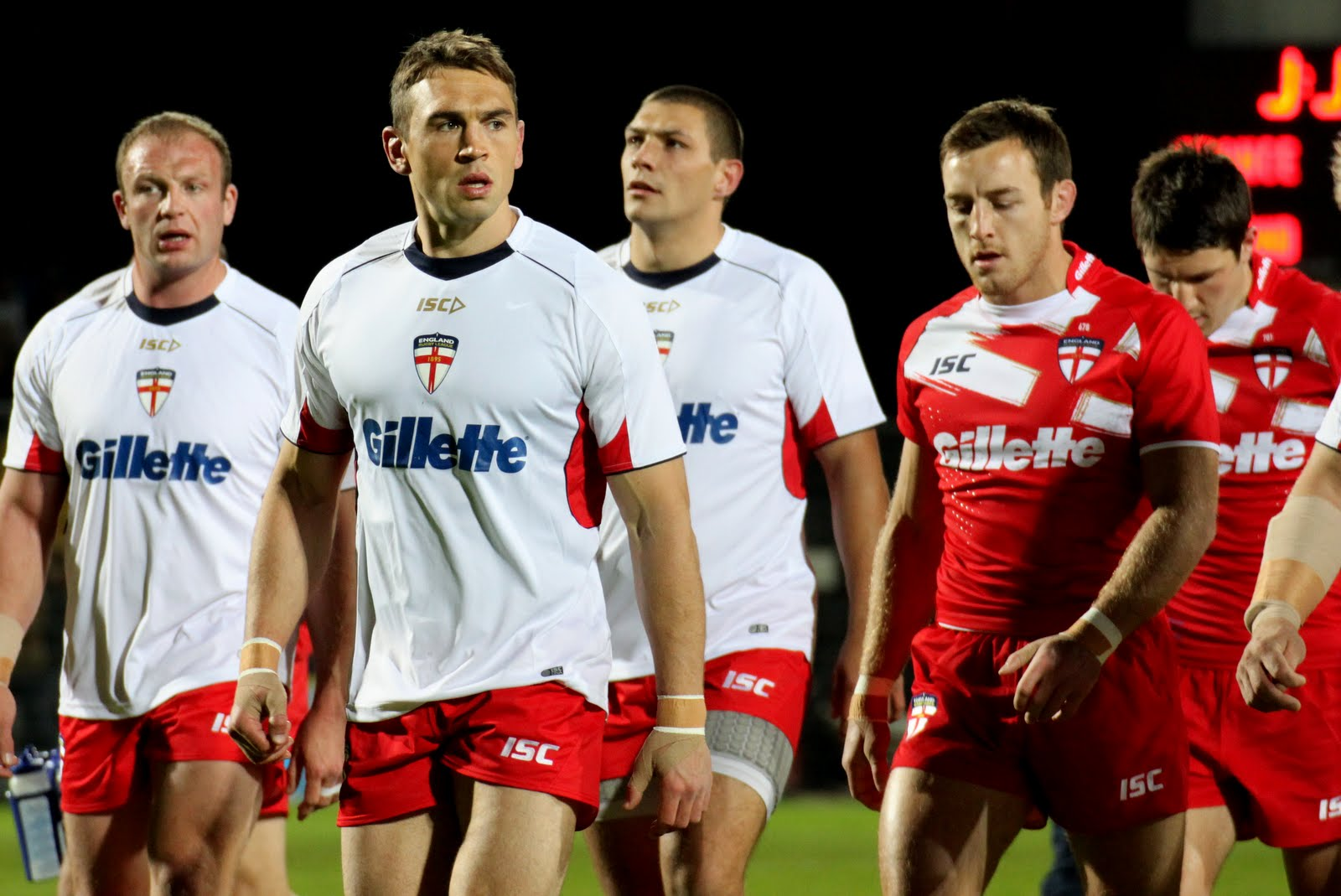
Sinfield playing for England in 2011

He captained Leeds from stand-off in the 2011 Challenge Cup Final defeat by the Wigan Warriors at Wembley Stadium, kicking only one goal from four attempts in their loss. At the end of the season he extended his record to captaining five championship-winning teams after Leeds Rhinos' victory over St Helens in the 2011 Super League Grand Final at Old Trafford.

Sinfield played a pivotal role in the England team in the 2011 Gillette Four Nations, which involved games against Australia, New Zealand and Wales. They reached the Gillette Four Nations Final courtesy of coming second in the group table, with England losing out to Australia despite Sinfield kicking two goals.

Sinfield became the all-time top points scorer for Leeds early in the 2012 season.

He played in the 2012 Challenge Cup Final defeat by the Warrington Wolves at Wembley Stadium.

In 2012, he extended his championship tally as Leeds again came from fifth in the regular season to triumph at Old Trafford – this time 26–18 against Warrington. Sinfield turned in a Man-of-the-Match performance in the final, winning the Harry Sunderland Trophy with a try, a penalty and four conversions. Remarkably, he finished the five-match playoff campaign with a 100% goalkicking record.

It was announced in January 2013 that Sinfield had won the Golden Boot – only the fourth Englishman to do so. He beat off competition from Wigan full-back Sam Tomkins as well as Australians Cameron Smith, Ben Barba, Cooper Cronk and Nate Myles to claim the prize that is awarded annually by Rugby League World magazine to the game's top performer.

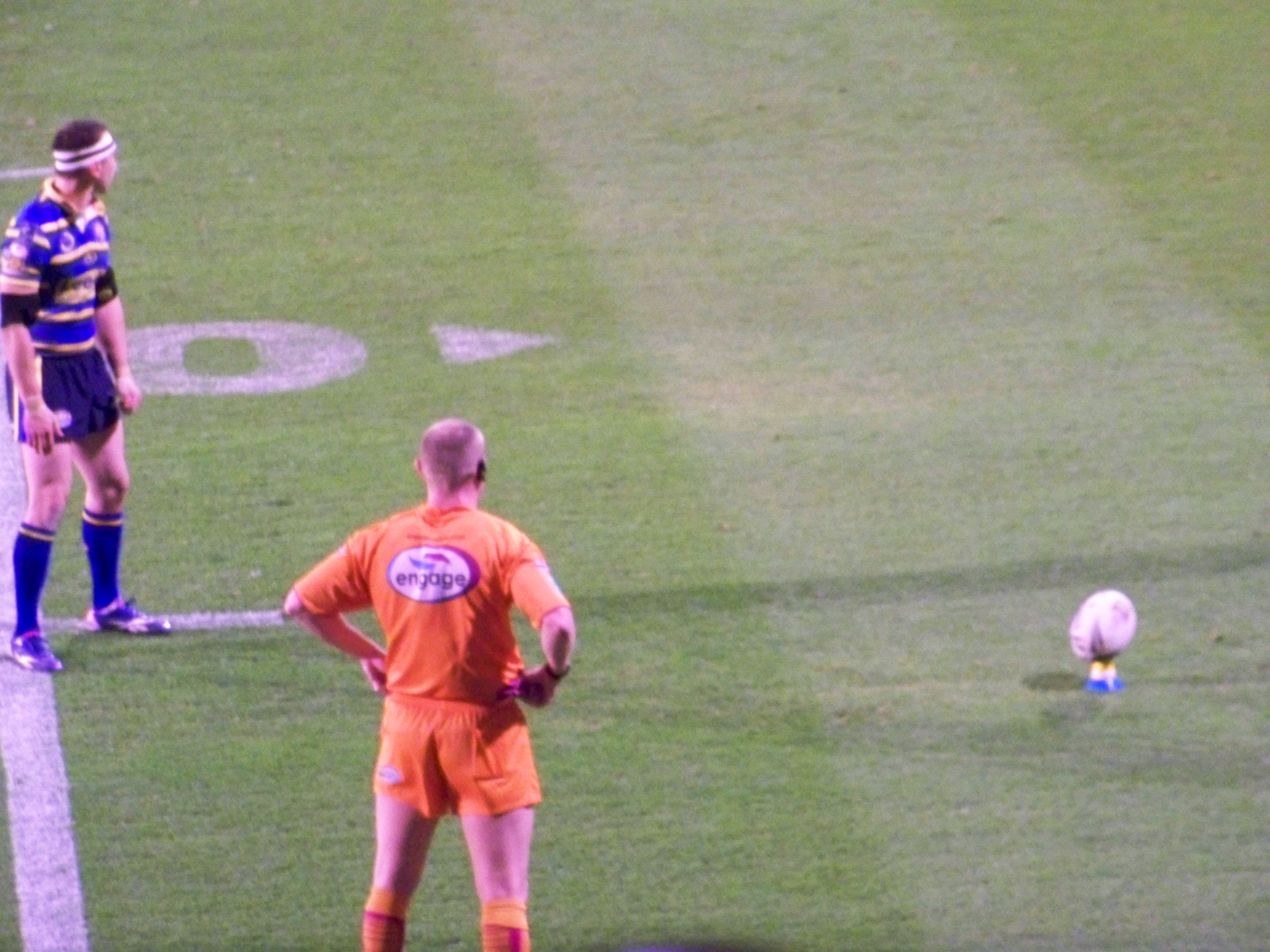
Sinfield holds the record for being the highest-scoring kicker in Super League history.

On 17 July 2014, for the first time in his career, Sinfield was sent off against Castleford for a headbutt on Luke Dorn A month later he captained Leeds in the 2014 Challenge Cup Final victory over the Castleford Tigers at Wembley Stadium, the last remaining domestic trophy that he had yet to win.

On 31 March 2015, Sinfield announced that the 2015 season would be his last in rugby league and that he would finish his career with rugby union side Yorkshire Carnegie.

He played in the 2015 Challenge Cup Final victory over Hull Kingston Rovers at Wembley Stadium.

His last match in rugby league was the 2015 Super League Grand Final, in which he captained Leeds to victory and thus secured the treble for the first time in the club's history.

=== Rugby union ===
Sinfield joined Leeds Rhinos' sister club Yorkshire Carnegie on an 18-month contract. Sinfield made his début at Headingley on 15 November 2015. He came on as a sub in the last 15 minutes in the British and Irish Cup, scoring a penalty but missing a conversion later on. In April 2016, Sinfield announced that he would retire from playing at the end of the season. During the 2015–2016 season he played 18 games; kicking 37 conversions and 16 penalties, for a total of 122 points.

== Coaching and management career ==
In August 2016, Sinfield joined the Rugby Football League (RFL) as Rugby Director, responsible for reviewing and developing a performance strategy for the England national team until the 2021 World Cup. In July 2018 he returned to Leeds Rhinos as their first ever director of rugby.

Part way through the 2021 season, Sinfield left Leeds to become defence coach at rugby union club, Leicester Tigers. After helping Leicester win the 2021–22 Premiership Rugby title, Sinfield moved to become defence coach to the England national rugby union team in December 2022, following Leicester head coach, Steve Borthwick, who was appointed England head coach.

== Charity fundraising ==
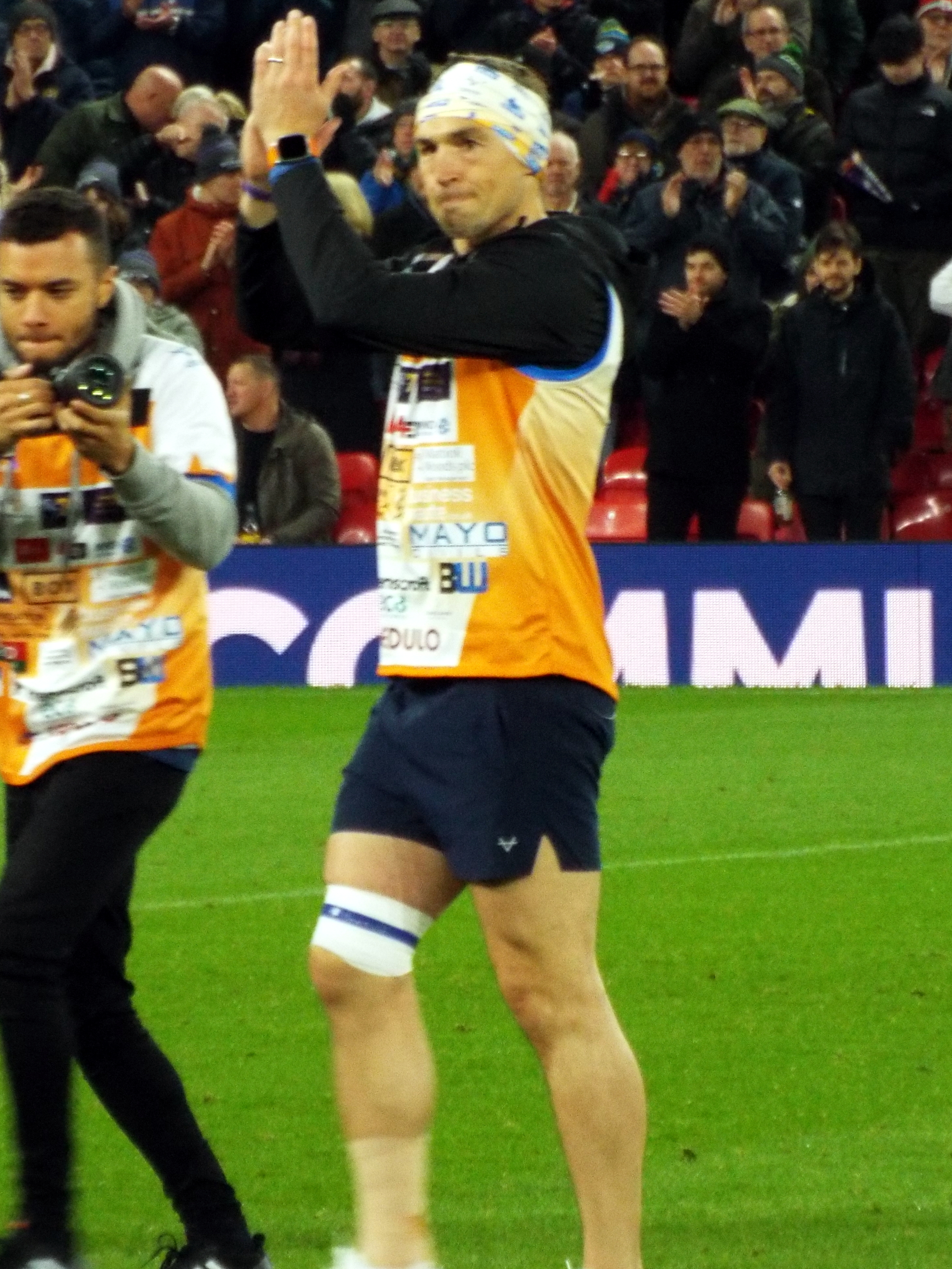
Sinfield at Old Trafford on 19 November 2022 at half-time of the 2021 Men's Rugby League World Cup final, upon completing his seven ultramarathons in seven days challenging for motor neurone disease awareness.

In November 2020, Sinfield announced that he would be running seven marathons in seven days to raise £77,777 for ex-Leeds teammate Rob Burrow, who had been diagnosed with motor neurone disease (MND) a year earlier, as well as the MND Association. He began his first marathon on 1 December with the fundraising target already exceeded, Sinfield described it as "completely overwhelming" that the target had been reached so quickly.

By the time that he finished his seventh marathon on 7 December, more than £1.2 million had been raised. At the conclusion, he said it had "probably been the most special week in my life". and said it was his greatest achievement above all he achieved in rugby league. By the following day, the total raised had surpassed £2 million. Of the funds raised, £500,000 was earmarked for research projects, a figure doubled by a contribution from medical research charity LifeArc to create a £1 million fund for MND research projects.

In October 2021, Sinfield announced his second fundraiser, running between Leicester Tigers' home ground Welford Road Stadium, and Leeds Rhinos' Headingley, a distance of approximately 101 miles (163 km), in under 24 hours. With an initial goal of £100,000, Sinfield was again raising funds for the MND Association, and described it as "the toughest challenge I have ever attempted", and the run was to be split into 24 sections of 7 km. Upon completing what was dubbed the "Extra Mile Challenge" on 23 November, Sinfield had raised over £1 million. He said that he would not stop fundraising until a cure had been found for the disease, and described himself as "massively blown away" by the amount raised, but said ideas of a knighthood were "really nice but we're a team". By early December, the campaign had raised over £2 million.

In September 2022, Sinfield announced his third fundraiser, in which he would run seven ultramarathons in seven consecutive days, beginning at Murrayfield Stadium in Edinburgh and concluding at Old Trafford in Manchester, the final run concluding during the final of the Rugby League World Cup. In addition to Burrow, Sinfield said he was now also fundraising in honour of former rugby union player Doddie Weir, and former footballer Stephen Darby, both diagnosed with MND.

For the fifth challenge, Sinfield is nearing his £777,777 fundraising target in his latest endurance challenge, "Running Home for Christmas." This week-long event involves running at least seven 7 km blocks daily for seven consecutive days. The challenge, which started in Liverpool and visited several UK cities, concludes with a final stage from Old Trafford to Saddleworth. As of the sixth stage, the total raised stood at over £728,000, adding to the nearly £10 million Sinfield has already raised for MND-related causes through his previous four challenges.

Rob Burrow died from complications of MND in 2024. Sinfield continued his fundraising in Burrow's memory, and in December 2025 completed a sixth challenge, "7 in 7: Together", running seven ultramarathons over seven consecutive days. By June 2026, his cumulative fundraising for MND-related causes across all of his challenges had passed £11 million.

== Personal life ==
Sinfield was appointed Member of the Order of the British Empire (MBE) in the 2014 Birthday Honours for services to rugby league, Officer of the Order of the British Empire (OBE) in the 2021 Birthday Honours for services to rugby league football and charitable fundraising and Commander of the Order of the British Empire (CBE) in the 2024 New Year Honours for services to motor neurone disease awareness.

On 20 December 2022, Sinfield, alongside former Leeds Rhinos teammate Rob Burrow, were awarded the Freedom of the City of Leeds for their services to the MND community.

Sinfield was made a Knight Bachelor by King Charles in the 2026 Birthday Honours for "services to Rugby League, Rugby Union and the MND community", which he received in October 2026 from Prince William officiating at the ceremony in Windsor Castle.

The honour made him only the second rugby league player ever to be knighted, in over 130 years of the sport, following Sir Billy Boston, who had received his knighthood the previous year. Sinfield said the award belonged to the rugby and MND communities and that he was proud to follow in Boston's footsteps, while Lindsey Burrow, the widow of his former Leeds Rhinos teammate Rob Burrow, welcomed the news and praised Sinfield's continued support for the MND community.

Sinfield became the first rugby league player to be nominated for the BBC Sports Personality of the Year Award, finishing in second place behind Andy Murray in 2015.

Sinfield is a supporter of Oldham Athletic, and was a regular at games before his rugby career took off.

His son, Jack Sinfield, is a professional rugby league player who previously played for Leeds Rhinos, before signing a three year deal from 2026 onwards with Wakefield Trinity.

Sinfield featured on the BBC Radio 4's Desert Island Discs on 14 October 2022.

He published his autobiography, The Extra Mile: My Autobiography, in May 2023.He received the Inspiration Award at The Lloyds British Business Excellence Awards on 10 November 2026.

== Records and statistics ==
Sinfield set a number of club and league records during his rugby league career. At Leeds, he is the all-time leading points scorer (3,967) and he made the third highest number of appearances (521) for the club. With a combined total of 4,231 points at club and representative level, he is the third-highest points scorer in British rugby league history (behind Neil Fox and Jim Sullivan). He is the Super League's second overall appearance holder (454) and the competition's record point scorer.

Team	Appearances	Tries	Goals	Drop goals	Points
Leeds Rhinos	521	86	1,792	39	3,967
England	26	5	91	0	202
England (v Exiles)	3	0	9	0	18
Lancashire	4	0	0	0	0
Great Britain	14	1	15	0	34
Great Britain (non-Test)	1	1	3	0	10
Career total	569	93	1,910	39	4,231

== Honours ==
=== Player ===
==== Rugby League ====
- Super League:

Champions (7): 2004, 2007, 2008, 2009, 2011, 2012, 2015
Runners up (1): 2005

- World Club Challenge:

Champions (3): 2005, 2008, 2012
Runners up (3): 2009, 2010, 2013

- League Leader's Shield:

Champions (3): 2004, 2009, 2015

- Challenge Cup:

Champions (2): 2014, 2015
Runners up (5): 2003, 2005, 2010, 2011, 2012

==== Rugby Union ====
- British and Irish Cup

Runners up (1): 2015-16

=== Coaching ===
==== Rugby Union ====
- Premiership:

Champions (1): 2021-22

=== Individual ===
- Rugby League World Golden Boot: 2012
- Harry Sunderland Trophy (2): 2009, 2012
- Lance Todd Trophy: 2005
- Super League Dream Team (4): 2005, 2006, 2008, 2009
- BBC Sports Personality of the Year
  - Main award: Second Place, 2015
  - Special Award, 2022
- RLWBA Merit Award: 2015

=== Orders ===
- Order of the British Empire:
  - MBE: 2014 (services to rugby league football)
  - OBE: 2021 (services to rugby league football and charitable fundraising)
  - CBE: 2024 (services to motor neurone disease awareness)
- Knight Bachelor: 2026 (services to rugby league, rugby union and the MND community)
