= Scott Donald =

Australian rugby league footballer

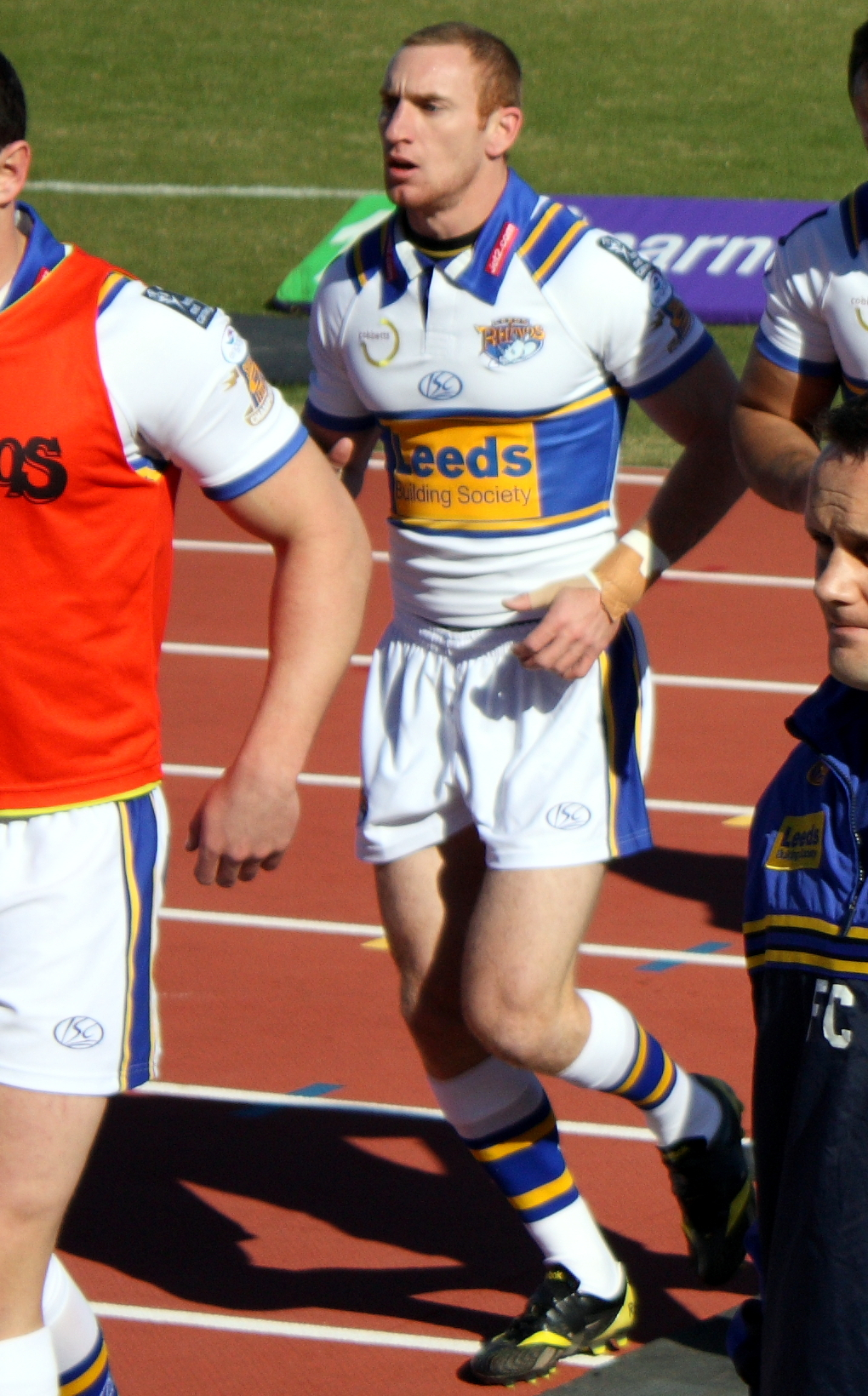

Personal information
- Full name: Scott William Donald
- Born: 14 February 1980 (age 46) Townsville, Queensland, Australia

Playing information
- Height: 183 cm (6 ft 0 in)
- Weight: 83 kg (13 st 1 lb)
- Position: Wing
Club
Years	Team	Pld	T	G	FG	P
1998–00	North Qld Cowboys	4	1	0	0	4
2001–02	Parramatta Eels	21	15	0	0	60
2003–05	Manly Sea Eagles	68	48	0	0	192
2006–10	Leeds Rhinos	145	93	0	0	372
	Total	238	157	0	0	628

Scott William Donald (born 14 February 1980) is an Australian former professional rugby league footballer who played in the 1990s and 2000s. He played in the National Rugby League for Australian clubs, North Queensland Cowboys, Parramatta Eels and Manly-Warringah Sea Eagles, and in the Super League for English club, Leeds Rhinos, usually on the wing.

== Playing career ==
=== National Rugby League ===
Scott Donald was born in Townsville, Queensland, and made his National Rugby League (NRL) début for the North Queensland Cowboys in Round 19 of the 1998 NRL season: a 14–10 win over the Adelaide Rams at the Malanda Stadium in Townsville. Donald only played four games in three seasons with the Cowboys before signing with Sydney based team the Parramatta Eels at the end of the 2000 season.

Donald made 14 appearances for Parramatta in 2001, but injury saw him miss the 2001 NRL Grand Final loss to the Newcastle Knights. Injury restricted him to just seven games in 2002, and at the end of the year he left the Parramatta club to join the Manly-Warringah Sea Eagles.

At Manly, Donald would finally cement a first grade spot on the wing and he played in 68 games for the Manly side over three seasons and was the club's leading try scorer in 2003, crossing for 21 tries in 24 games.

=== Super League ===
After three seasons at Manly in which he scored 48 tries in 68 games, Donald left the NRL and joined English Super League club the Leeds Rhinos at the back end of 2005 as a replacement for outgoing winger Mark Calderwood. Donald scored a try on début for the Leeds club against the Huddersfield Giants at Headingley Carnegie Stadium in Leeds on 11 February 2006.

He was the 3rd top try scoring winger in the league in 2006, with only St Helens' Ade Gardner, and Catalans' Justin Murphy scoring more tries than he did.

In the 2007 Super League season, he went on to score a total of 20 tries and has still to miss a match for the Leeds side on completing his third season. In September 2007, Donald was named in the Super League Dream Team. In October 2007, Donald scored a try in Leeds 33–6 victory over St Helens at Old Trafford in the Super League Grand Final.

Donald was named in the Super League Dream Team for 2008's Super League XIII season.

Donald played in the 2008 Super League Grand Final victory over St Helens.

Donald played on the wing for the Leeds club in their 20–28 loss to his former team Manly in the 2009 World Club Challenge at Elland Road in Leeds.

Donald played in the 2009 Super League Grand Final victory over St. Helens at Old Trafford.

Donald retired from playing at the end of the 2010 Super League season.
