= Carl Ablett =

Former England international rugby league footballer

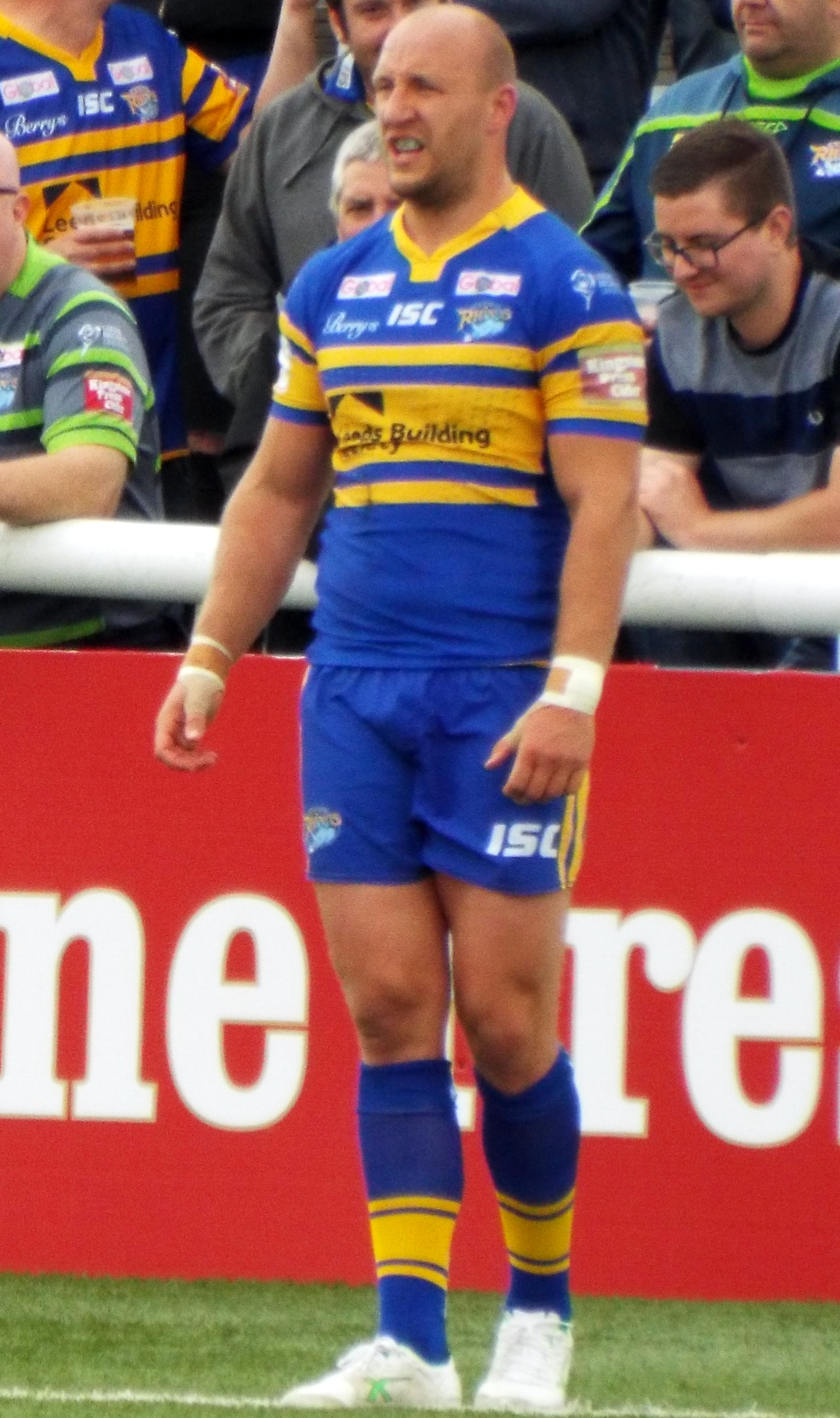

Personal information
- Born: 19 December 1985 (age 40) Middleton, West Yorkshire, England

Playing information
- Height: 6 ft 0 in (183 cm)
- Weight: 15 st 10 lb (100 kg)
- Position: Second-row, Centre, Loose forward
Club
Years	Team	Pld	T	G	FG	P
2004–19	Leeds Rhinos	323	80	0	0	320
2005(loan)	→ London Broncos	5	0	0	0	0
	Total	328	80	0	0	320
Representative
Years	Team	Pld	T	G	FG	P
2012–13	England	6	0	0	0	0

Carl Ablett (born 19 December 1985) is an English former professional rugby league footballer who played as a second-row, loose forward or centre for the Leeds Rhinos in the Super League and England at international level.

Ablett spent time on loan from Leeds at the London Broncos in the Super League in 2005.

== Background ==
Ablett was born in Middleton, Leeds, West Yorkshire, England.

== Career ==
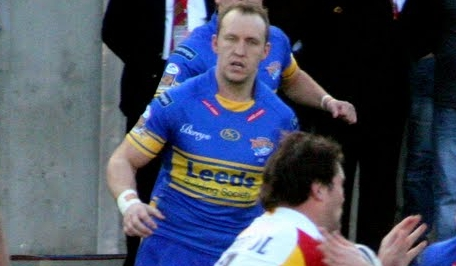
Ablett playing for the Leeds Rhinos

In 2005, he spent a month on loan at London Broncos.

Ablett played in the 2009 Super League Grand Final victory over St. Helens at Old Trafford.

Ablett played in the 2010 Challenge Cup Final defeat by Warrington at Wembley Stadium.

Ablett played in the 2011 Challenge Cup Final defeat by Wigan at Wembley Stadium.

Ablett played in the 2011 Super League Grand Final victory over St. Helens at Old Trafford.

In 2012, he along with Zak Hardaker signed five-year contract with the Leeds. Ablett played in the 2012 Challenge Cup Final defeat by Warrington at Wembley Stadium. Ablett played in the 2012 Super League Grand Final victory over Warrington at Old Trafford.

Ablett played in the 2014 Challenge Cup Final victory over Castleford at Wembley Stadium.

Ablett played in the 2015 Challenge Cup Final victory over Hull Kingston Rovers at Wembley Stadium. Ablett played in the 2015 Super League Grand Final victory over Wigan at Old Trafford.

Ablett played in the 2017 Super League Grand Final victory over the Castleford Tigers at Old Trafford.

In 2018, Ablett captained Leeds on several occasions.

On 9 September 2019, Ablett announced he would retire at the end of the season.

== International career ==
Ablett was called up to the England squad for the 2011 Rugby League Four Nations tournament. However, he did not get any game time in the competition.

Ablett was selected in England's 24-man squad for the 2013 Rugby League World Cup.

== Honours ==
Super League (7): 2007, 2008, 2009, 2011, 2012, 2015, 2017

Challenge Cup (2): 2014, 2015

League Leaders' Shield (2): 2009, 2015

World Club Challenge (1): 2012
