= Lee Smith (rugby) =

England RL international and dual-code rugby footballer

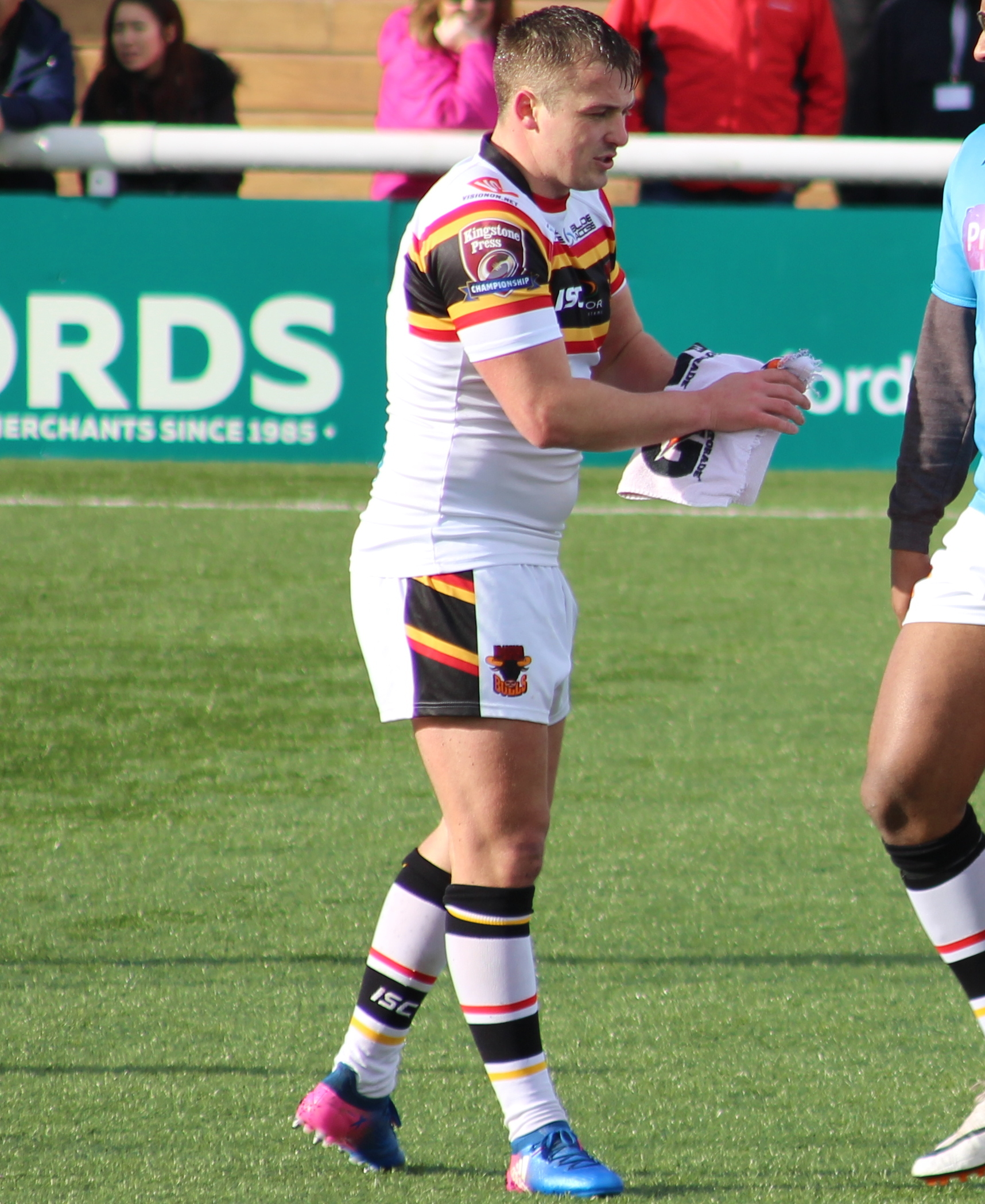

Personal information
- Born: 8 August 1986 (age 39) Morley, West Yorkshire, England

Playing information
- Height: 5 ft 10 in (1.78 m)
- Weight: 13 st 5 lb (85 kg)

Rugby league
- Position: Wing, Centre, Fullback
Club
| Years | Team | Pld | T | G | FG | P |
|---|---|---|---|---|---|---|
| 2005–09 | Leeds Rhinos | 104 | 51 | 22 | 1 | 249 |
| 2010–12 | Leeds Rhinos | 54 | 17 | 12 | 0 | 92 |
| 2012–13 | Wakefield Trinity Wildcats | 35 | 17 | 64 | 2 | 198 |
| 2015 | Wakefield Trinity Wildcats | 6 | 6 | 15 | 1 | 55 |
| 2016 | Leigh Centurions | 23 | 12 | 36 | 0 | 120 |
| 2017–18 | Bradford Bulls | 22 | 8 | 5 | 0 | 42 |
| | Total | 244 | 111 | 154 | 4 | 756 |
Representative
| Years | Team | Pld | T | G | FG | P |
| 2006–09 | England | 8 | 7 | 1 | 0 | 30 |

Rugby union
- Position: Outside centre, Fullback, Wing
Club
| Years | Team | Pld | T | G | FG | P |
|---|---|---|---|---|---|---|
| 2009–10 | London Wasps | 2 | 0 | 0 | 0 | 0 |
| 2014–15 | Newcastle Falcons | 10 | 4 | 3 | 0 | 28 |
| 2019–20 | Yorkshire Carnegie |
| | Total | 12 | 4 | 3 | 0 | 28 |

Lee Smith (born 8 August 1986) is an English former professional rugby league footballer who played as a goal-kicking centre, wing or fullback for the Leeds Rhinos in Super League.

He has previously played rugby union with the London Wasps and the Newcastle Falcons, and played rugby league for the Leeds Rhinos and Wakefield Trinity Wildcats in the Super League.

== Early life ==
Smith attended Bruntcliffe High School in Morley, Leeds. He played amateur rugby league for Drighlington before joining Leeds Rhinos academy as a teenager. He was named Senior Academy Player of the Year in 2003, with the team winning their Grand Final. Smith represented England at U17 and U18 level.

== Rugby League ==
=== Leeds Rhinos ===
Smith broke into the Leeds first team in 2005 but still captained the Senior Academy team to Grand Final success in 2006 against Hull. Smith made his début for the Leeds Rhinos first team on 28 March 2005 against Wakefield Trinity. He went on to make 10 appearances in his first season, scoring an impressive 8 tries.

Smith further established himself as a first team player in 2006, making 21 appearances and scoring 9 tries.

In 2007 Smith made 21 appearances and scored 8 tries. Most notably the Leeds fourth of five tries in the 33-6 Grand Final victory over St Helens.

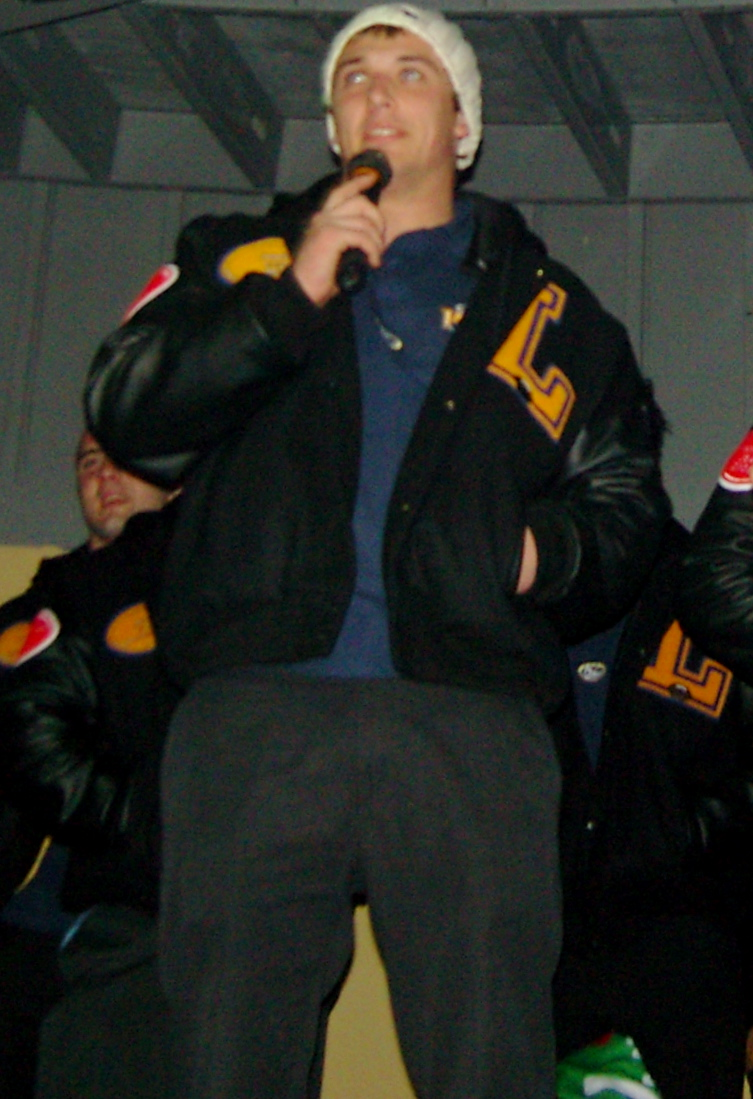
Smith in the United States representing the Leeds Rhinos

He played in 2008 World Club Challenge on 29 February at Elland Road in which Leeds beat Melbourne Storm 11–4.

The 2008 season was arguably Smith's best to date, making 25 appearances and scoring a joint career best 13 tries. Leeds again defeated St Helens to win the Grand Final, 24–16. Smith had to deputise at full-back after Brent Webb was ruled out after suffering a recurrence of a back injury sustained earlier in the season. Smith scored Leeds' opening try, making it the second year in a row he had scored in the Grand Final. He was awarded the Harry Sunderland Trophy (Man of the Match).

In 2009 Smith switched from his usual wing position to centre. This did not affect his try scoring record though as he again scored 13 tries, but in just 24 appearances. On 23 June 2009 Smith signed a two-year contract to join Rugby Union side the London Wasps after the Super League season had ended.

Leeds won the Grand Final for a record third season in a row & Smith marked, what should have been, his final game for the club with 2 tries in the 18–10 victory over St Helens at Old Trafford. This meant Smith had scored in three consecutive Grand Finals.

=== Return to Leeds ===
Smith was given the number 28 jersey. Smith effectively made his second début for Leeds on 1 April 2010 against Bradford, scoring 2 tries in a 20–20 draw.

He played in the 2010 Challenge Cup Final defeat by the Warrington Wolves at Wembley Stadium.

Smith went on to make a further 22 appearances in 2010, scoring a further 8 tries.

In 2011 he visited and participated in the Wheelchair rugby league at Morley Leisure Centre.

During the 2011 and 2012 seasons, Smith's game time was limited due to injury and the emergence of a number of young outside backs at Leeds.

=== Wakefield Trinity Wildcats ===
As a result of limited gametime at Leeds he was allowed to join the Wakefield Trinity Wildcats mid-season in 2012 of which coach Richard Agar was very pleased.

=== Return to Wakefield ===
Smith returned to rugby league with Wakefield at the end of the 2015 Super League season, and played a key role in the club retaining their Super League status. Despite this, he once again left the club at the end of the 2015 season.

=== Hull FC ===
Smith earned himself a trial at Super League club Hull F.C. after impressing coach Lee Radford while training with the club.

=== Leigh Centurions ===
Smith played for the Leigh Centurions during the 2016 season.

=== Bradford Bulls ===
Smith moved to the Bradford Bulls from the 2017 season. After a mixed 2017 he was named club captain under new coach John Kear for the 2018 season.

=== International ===
He was selected in 2006, along with six of his Leeds teammates, to represent England in the Federation Shield tournament. He scored a try in the opening match against France & then scored a last minute try in England's second game against Tonga. He also came off the bench in the third game against Samoa. He then played in the final as England completed their unbeaten tournament with a 32–14 win, again over Tonga.

Smith with England at the 2008 Rugby League World Cup

Smith was selected for the England squad to compete in the 2008 Rugby League World Cup tournament in Australia. Group A's opening match against Papua New Guinea he played on the wing and scored three tries in England's victory. He then only made one further appearance as England endured a disappointing tournament, crashing out in the semi-finals without winning another match.

Smith was selected for England again in 2009, for the Four Nations tournament. He scored a try in the victory over France and in the defeat by Australia but then missed out as England went on to lose in the final against Australia.

== Rugby Union ==
=== London Wasps ===
Smith made just one appearance for the London Wasps, in a 9–3 victory against the Newcastle Falcons in the LV Cup on 7 February 2010, before his contract was mutually terminated. It is understood that Smith missing his home, family & friends were the reason behind the termination. After what was one of the shortest code switches in history, Smith signed a three-and-a-half-year deal with former club Leeds.

=== Newcastle Falcons ===
On 10 February 2014 he was drafted by Newcastle Falcons and in March of the same year played against Leicester Tigers.
