= List of Leeds Rhinos captains =

The following is a list of full-time captains of Leeds Rhinos Rugby League Football Club.

== Captains ==
| Name | Years | Honours (as captain) |
|---|---|---|
| (England) Garry Schofield | 1987–1990 | |
| (England) Ellery Hanley | 1991–1995 | |
| (England) Neil Harmon | 1996 | |
| (Wales) Iestyn Harris | 1997–2001 | Challenge Cup 1999 |
| (England) Kevin Sinfield | 2002–2015 | Super League: 2004, 2007, 2008, 2009, 2011, 2012, 2015; League Leaders Shield: 2004, 2009, 2015; Challenge Cup: 2014, 2015; World Club Challenge: 2005, 2008, 2012 |
| (England) Danny McGuire | 2016–2017 | Super League 2017 |
| (England) Kallum Watkins | 2018–2019 | |
| (Australia) Trent Merrin | 2019 | |
| (England) Stevie Ward | 2020 | |
| (England) Luke Gale | 2020–2021 | Challenge Cup 2020 |
| (Australia) Matt Prior | 2021 | |
| (England) Kruise Leeming | 2022 | |
| no full-time captain | 2023 | |
| (England) Cameron Smith | 2024 | |
