= Ryan Hall (rugby league) =

Great Britain and England international rugby league footballer

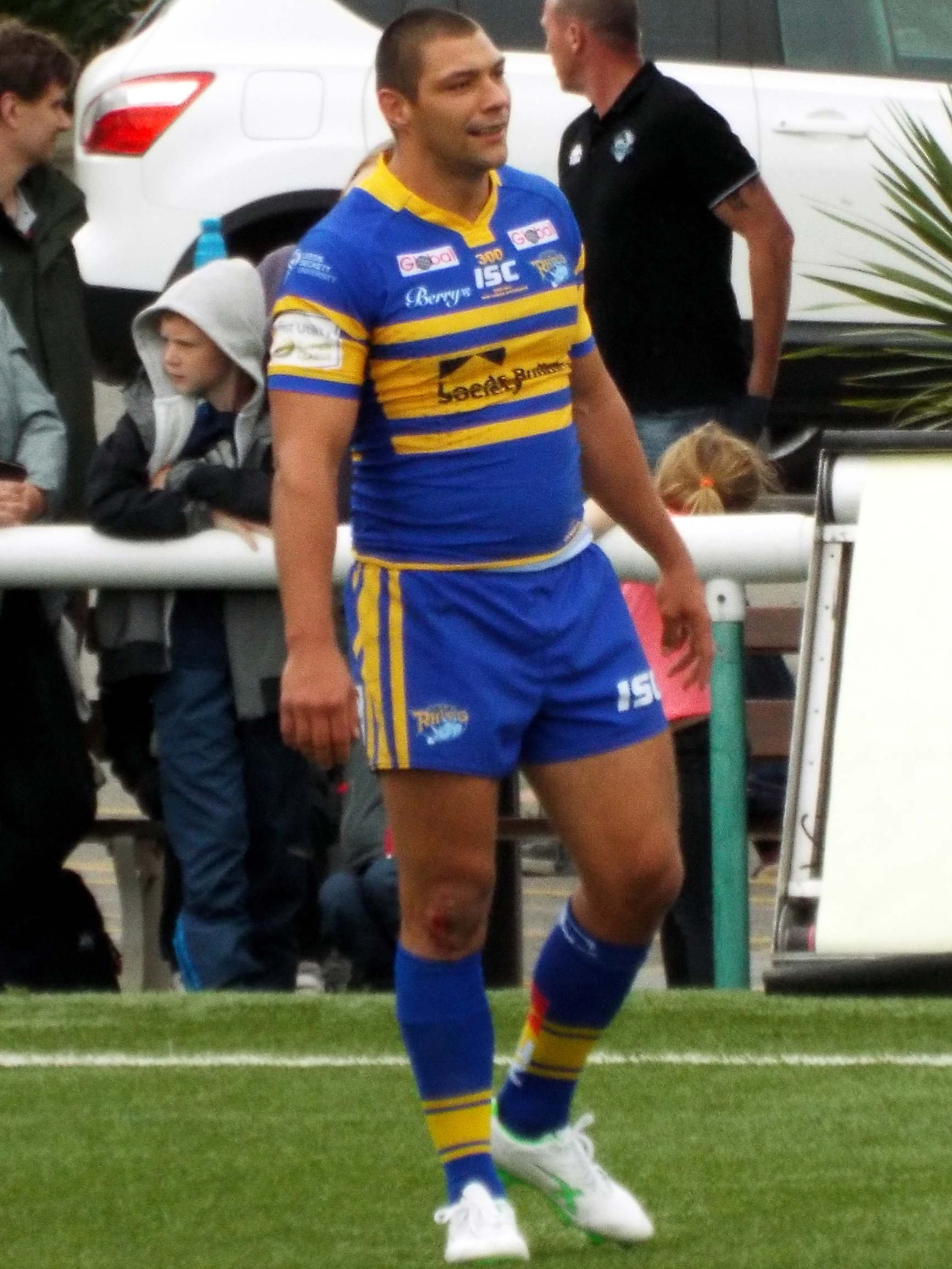

Personal information
- Full name: Ryan Lee Hall
- Born: 27 November 1987 (age 38) Rothwell, West Yorkshire, England

Playing information
- Height: 6 ft 0 in (1.84 m)
- Weight: 16 st 7 lb (105 kg)
- Position: Wing
Club
Years	Team	Pld	T	G	FG	P
2007–18	Leeds Rhinos	330	233	0	0	932
2019–20	Sydney Roosters	11	0	0	0	0
2021–24	Hull Kingston Rovers	106	62	0	0	248
2025–26	Leeds Rhinos	51	24	0	0	96
	Total	498	319	0	0	1276
Representative
Years	Team	Pld	T	G	FG	P
2009–22	England	40	39	0	0	156
2019	Great Britain	2	0	0	0	0

Ryan Lee Hall (born 27 November 1987) is an English former professional rugby league footballer who last played as a winger for the Leeds Rhinos in the Super League, and played for England and Great Britain at international level.

Hall began his career with Leeds, winning the Super League Grand Final in 2008, 2009, 2011, 2012, 2015 and 2017. In 2014 he was part of the Leeds team that won the Challenge Cup and was the winner of the Lance Todd Trophy. After leaving Leeds he spent two seasons playing for the Sydney Roosters in the NRL. In 2024 he overtook Danny McGuire to become the Super League all-time top try scorer. Hall is also the England national rugby league team's joint appearance maker and all-time top scorer.

== Early years ==
Hall was born in Rothwell, West Yorkshire, England, and attended Royds School.

Hall began playing rugby league for amateur club Oulton Raiders. His coach at Oulton contacted the town's professional team, Leeds Rhinos, and Hall subsequently joined the club's Academy in 2006. He made eight appearances for the Junior Academy team in his début season, before quickly being selected for the Senior Academy team. He made eleven appearances for the Senior Academy team & scored three tries, including the Senior Academy Grand Final victory over Hull FC.

== Playing career ==
=== Leeds ===
==== 2007–2012 ====
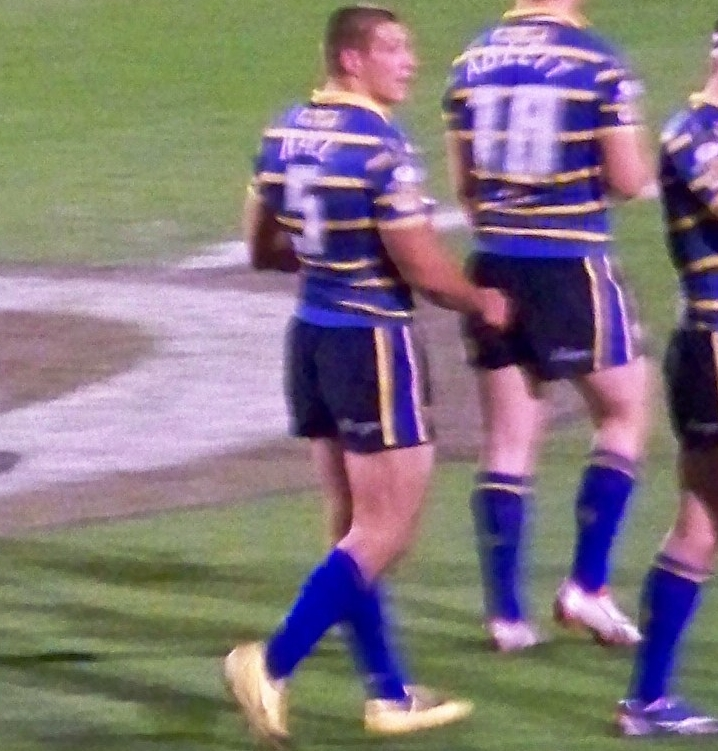
Hall leaving the pitch at Headingley after beating Catalans Dragons 27–20 in the 2009 Superleague playoff semi final

Hall made his Super League début in May 2007, coming off the bench at the 2007 Millennium Magic weekend at the Millennium Stadium in Cardiff in the controversial 42–38 victory over Bradford Bulls. He made his first start a fortnight later in the defeat at Hull F.C., and scored his first try for the club in July 2007 against St Helens. He went on to make nine first team appearances in 2007, scoring three tries, and was awarded an extended contract at the end of the year. He was named in the initial 20-man squad for the 2007 Super League Grand Final against St Helens, but was not selected in the final squad.

In 2008, Hall made 16 appearances and scored nine tries. In July 2008, he suffered a foot injury in Leeds' Challenge Cup semi-final defeat against St Helens, and was initially ruled out for the rest of the season. However, he recovered from the injury in time to be selected for the 2008 Super League Grand Final, scoring a try in the 24–16 victory, again against St Helens. He signed a new three-year contract with the club at the end of the season.

In 2009, Hall became a regular in Leeds' first team as the team went on to win their third Grand Final in a row, 18-10, again against St Helens at Old Trafford.

Hall ended 2009 as the season's top try-scorer, with 31 tries in just 30 games in all competitions, including five tries in one game in a 76–12 win against Castleford Tigers. He was named Young Player of the Year, as well as runner-up in the Player of the Year award. He also received the Rugby League International Federation's Rookie of the Year award for 2009.

In 2010, Hall scored 31 tries in 33 appearances & was named in the Super League Dream Team for the second year in a row and featured in the 2010 World Club Challenge and 2010 Challenge Cup Final for Leeds. He played in the 2010 Challenge Cup Final defeat by the Warrington Wolves at Wembley Stadium.

Hall played on the wing and scored two tries for Leeds in the 2011 Challenge Cup Final defeat by the Wigan Warriors at Wembley Stadium. He also played in the 2011 Super League Grand Final victory over St. Helens at Old Trafford.

In January 2012, Hall signed a new five-year contract with Leeds. On 17 February 2012, Hall confirmed his standing as one of the premier wingers in rugby league when he scored 2 tries – including a 95-metre intercept try – and was named man-of-the-match in Leeds' 26–12 victory over Australian champions Manly-Warringah Sea Eagles in the 2012 World Club Challenge played at the home venue of Leeds, Headingley. Throughout the year he showed outstanding form, which earned him the award of being named the 'World's Best Winger'.

He played in the 2012 Challenge Cup Final defeat by the Warrington Wolves at Wembley Stadium, and in the 2012 Super League Grand Final victory over the Warrington Wolves at Old Trafford.

==== 2013–2018 ====
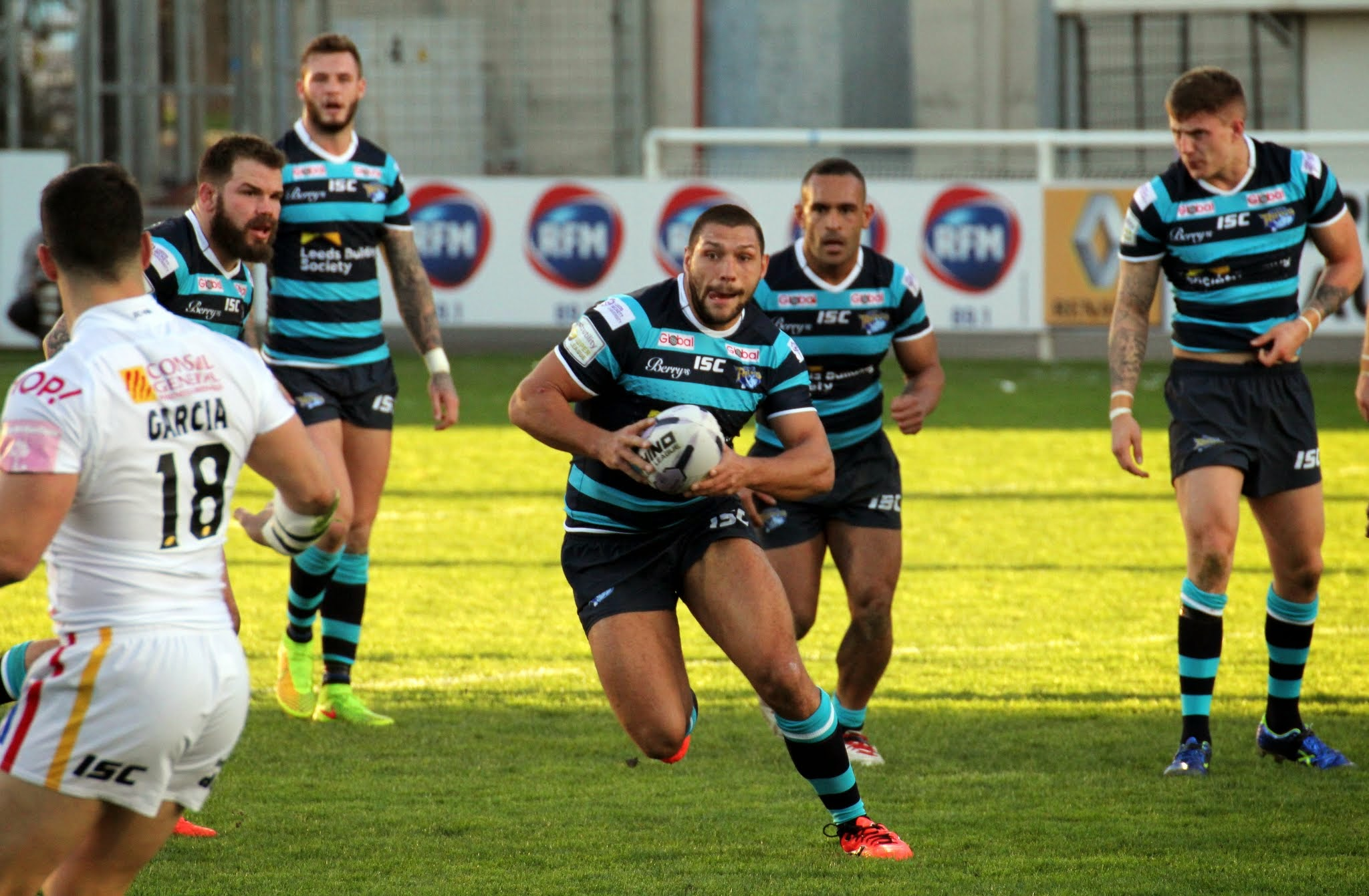
Hall playing for Leeds in 2015

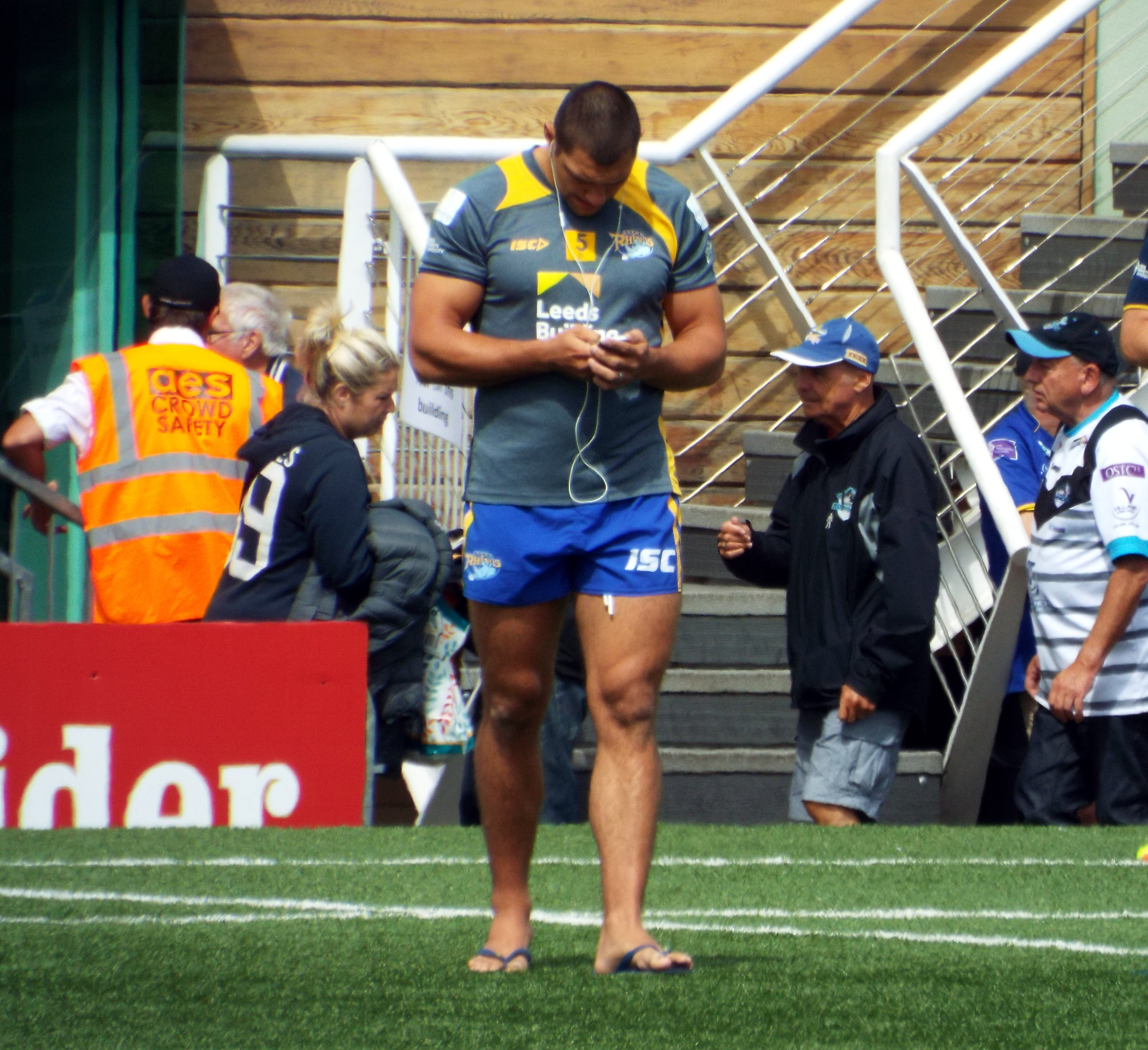
Hall pre-game for Leeds in 2016

In 2014, Hall signed a new five-year deal for the Leeds Rhinos.

He played in the 2014 Challenge Cup Final victory over the Castleford Tigers at Wembley Stadium, Hall scoring two tries as Leeds beat Castleford, 23–10, and was voted the winner of the Lance Todd Trophy.

He played in the 2015 Challenge Cup Final victory over Hull Kingston Rovers at Wembley Stadium.

In September 2015, his 200th try for the club came against Huddersfield Giants, scoring in the final seconds of the game to clinch the League Leaders' Shield for Leeds. He went on to play in the 2015 Super League Grand Final victory over the Wigan Warriors at Old Trafford.

He played in the 2017 Super League Grand Final victory over the Castleford Tigers at Old Trafford.

In July 2018, Hall agreed to join NRL side Sydney Roosters at the start of the 2019 season. A few weeks later, Hall played his last game for Leeds against Toulouse Olympique, suffering an ACL injury which ruled him out for the rest of the season.

=== Sydney Roosters ===
Hall signed a two-year contract with the Roosters, and was seen as a replacement on the wing for the departing Blake Ferguson.

Hall made his NRL debut for the Sydney Roosters against Brisbane in Round 10 of the 2019 NRL season which finished in a 15–10 loss at Suncorp Stadium. The following week, Hall made his first appearance for North Sydney, the reserve grade side for Eastern Suburbs in the Canterbury Cup NSW.

Hall made six appearances for the Sydney Roosters scoring no tries. He was not included in the club's finals campaign or the grand final team which defeated Canberra to win their second successive premiership.

Hall made just five appearances for the Sydney Roosters in the 2020 NRL season scoring no tries. He was not included in the club's finals campaign and was subsequently released.

On 15 November 2020, Hull Kingston Rovers announced the signing of Hall to a two-year contract.

=== Hull Kingston Rovers ===
In round 1 of the 2021 Super League season, Hall made his debut for Hull Kingston Rovers. After failing to score a try for two years, Hall scored a hat-trick in a 29–28 loss against Catalans Dragons.

In round 5 of the 2021 Super League season, he scored two tries in a 50–26 loss against Warrington.

In round 9 of the 2021 Super League season, Hall scored a hat-trick in Hull KR's 40–16 victory over Leigh. Hall made a total of 20 appearances for Hull KR in the 2021 Super League season scoring 16 tries including one against the Catalans Dragons in the 2021 semi-final defeat at the Stade Gilbert Brutus He also made one appearance in the Challenge Cup. In round 8 of the 2023 Super League season, Hall scored a hat-trick in Hull Kingston Rovers 40–0 victory over arch-rivals Hull F.C. On 12 August, Hall played for Hull Kingston Rovers in their 17-16 golden point extra-time loss to Leigh in the Challenge Cup final. On 12 October 2024, Hall played in Hull Kingston Rovers 2024 Super League Grand Final loss against Wigan.

=== Leeds Rhinos (re-join) ===
On 22 April 2024 it was reported that Hall would re-join Leeds on a one-year deal. In June 2025, Hall extended his contract until the 2026 season.

On 9 October 2026, Hall announced his retirement from rugby league.

== International career ==
He earned a place in the England squad for the 2010 Four Nations tournament and although injury ruled him out of the first Test against New Zealand, he returned for the final game against Papua New Guinea. He also represented England in their 60–6 win over France.

Hall was also selected for the 2011 Four Nations, scoring 2 tries against Australia at Wembley in a 20–36 loss.

In 2013, Ryan was selected to help England's causes in the 2013 Rugby League World Cup. He was one of the best players in the tournament, earning himself a place on the wing in the RLIF team of the year. He scored eight tries in five matches for England. He had scored 21 tries in 20 games in total for England, which was a new record.

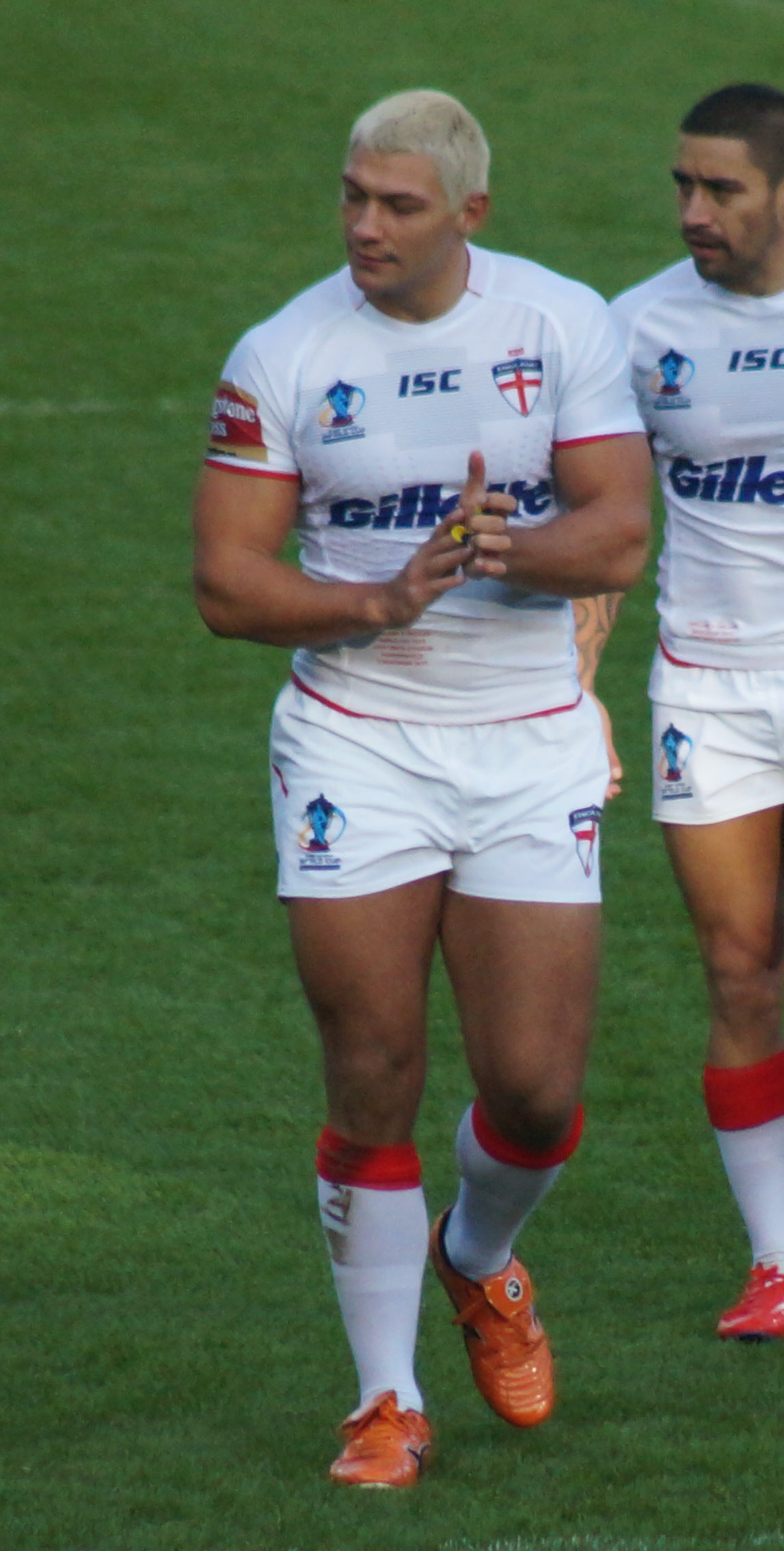
Hall while playing for England at the 2013 World Cup

In November 2014, Hall played in the 2014 Four Nations. He was England's top try scorer in the tournament, scoring three tries. He scored his fifth try in four test matches against Australia, and he scored a double against New Zealand.

In October 2015, Hall was picked in a 24-man England squad to play against New Zealand in a three-match test-series. Beforehand though, England played a test match against France in Leigh. Hall scored two tries in a match where England would go on to dominate their opponents and thereon create a new record for the biggest winning margin against the 'Les Tricolores'.

The following year, Hall was picked in England's 24-man squad for the 2016 Four Nations. On 22 October 2016, Hall extended his England try scoring record, scoring another two tries against France in Avignon. In the Four Nations, Hall scored one try in each of England's games to keep his try scoring record for England in as many appearances.

In 2017, Ryan continued his try scoring form for England in a mid-season test match against Samoa in Australia. Later in the year, he was selected as a part of England's 24-man squad for the 2017 Rugby League World Cup.

He was selected in England 9s squad for the 2019 Rugby League World Cup 9s.

He was selected in squad for the 2019 Great Britain Lions tour of the Southern Hemisphere. He made his Great Britain test debut in the defeat by Tonga.

Hall was selected by England for the 2021 Rugby League World Cup. Hall was not included in England's opening round victory over Samoa, but was selected for the second group stage match. He scored two tries in England's 42–18 victory over France, the first of which was also his 300th career try. In the third group stage match, Hall scored two tries in England's 94–4 victory over minnows Greece.

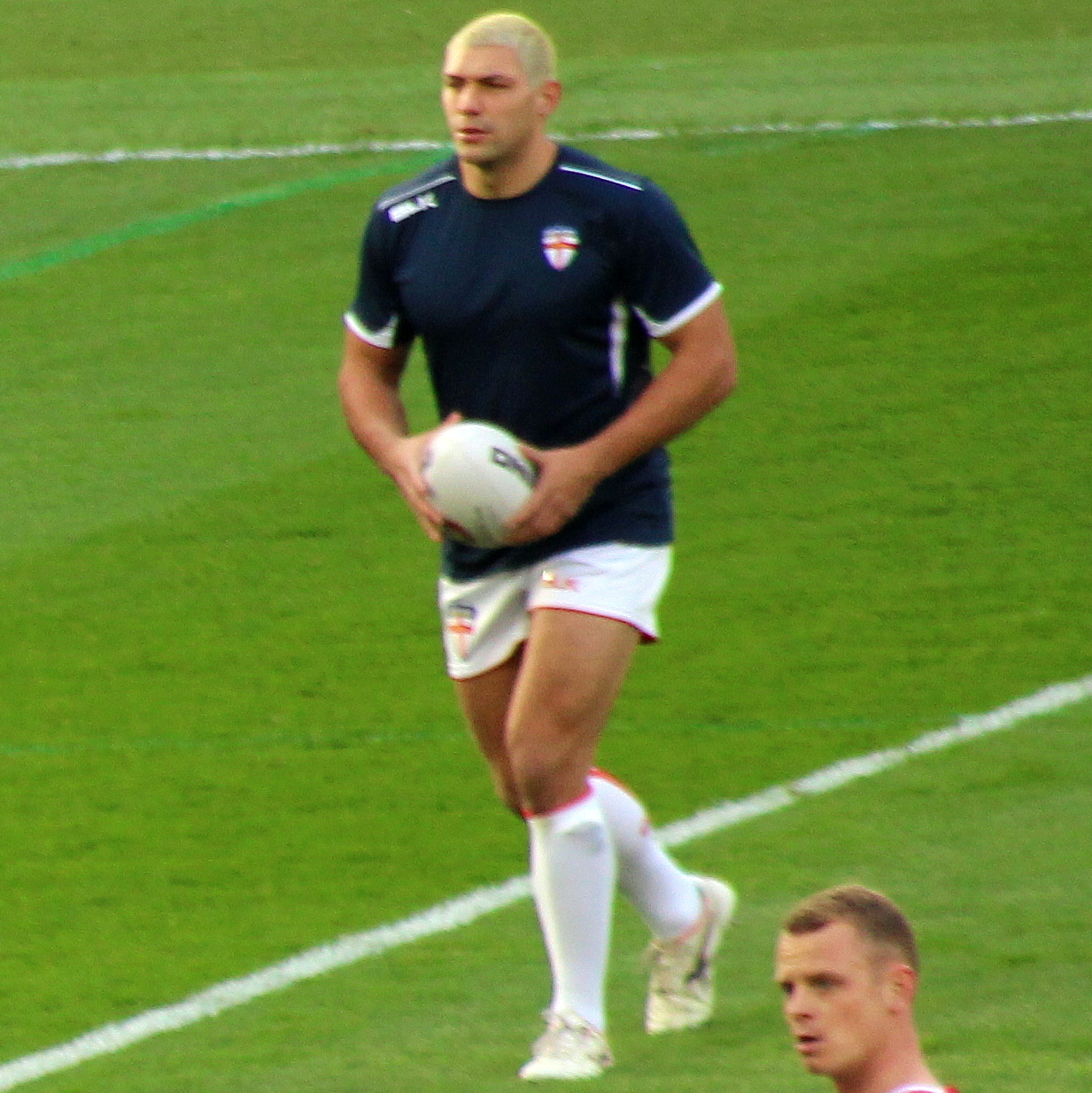
Hall warming up for England in 2016

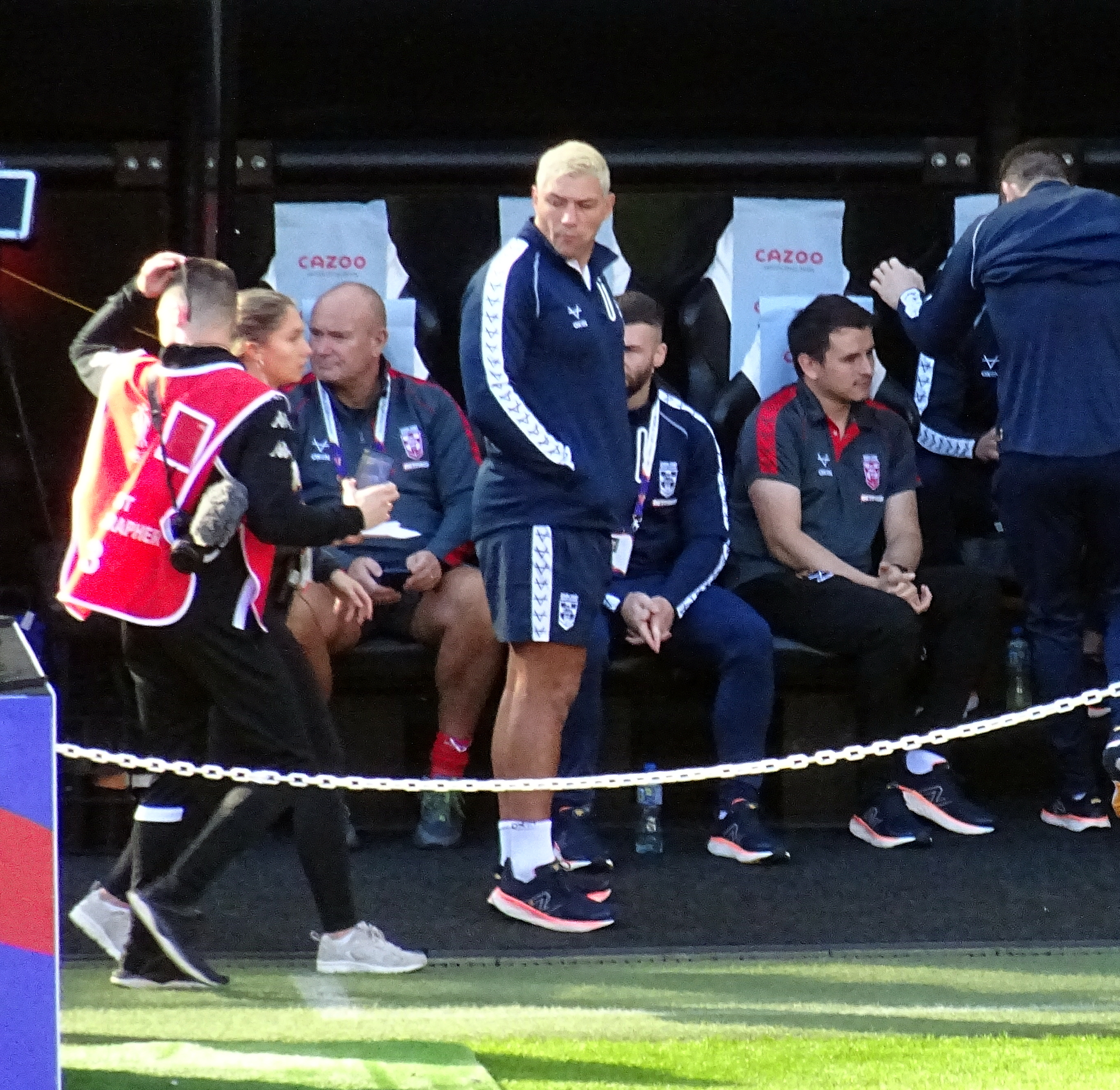
Hall as part of the wider squad for England at the 2021 RLWC

== Career stats ==
Appearances and try's by national team and year
National team	Year	Apps	Tries
England	2009	5	2
England	2010	3	0
England	2011	6	5
England	2012	4	6
England	2013	6	8
England	2014	3	3
England	2015	4	2
England	2016	4	5
England	2017	6	3
England	2018	1	1
England	2022 (Note: No England caps were available between 2019 and 2021 due to the 2019 Great Britain Lions tour and the COVID-19 pandemic)	3	4
Total		45	39
Great Britain	2019	2	0
Career Total		47	39

List of international tries scored by Ryan Hall
No.	Date	Venue	Opponent	Result	Competition
1	13 June 2009	Stade Jean-Bouin, Paris, France	France	12-66	Friendly
2	23 October 2009	Stade Jean-Bouin, Paris, France	France	12-34	2009 Four Nations
3	21 October 2011	Parc des Sports d’Avignon, Avigon, France	France	18-32	Friendly
4	5 November 2011	Wembley Stadium, London, England	Australia	20-36	2011 Four Nations
5	5 November 2011	Wembley Stadium, London, England	Australia	20-36	2011 Four Nations
6	12 November 2011	MKM Stadium, Hull, England	New Zealand	38-6	2011 Four Nations
7	19 November 2011	Elland Road, Leeds, England	Australia	8-30	2011 Four Nations
8	27 October 2012	Racecourse Ground, Wrexham, Wales	Wales	12-80	Friendly
9	27 October 2012	Racecourse Ground, Wrexham, Wales	Wales	12-80	Friendly
10	11 November 2012	Salford City Stadium, Salford, England	France	48-4	Friendly
11	11 November 2012	Salford City Stadium, Salford, England	France	48-4	Friendly
12	11 November 2012	Salford City Stadium, Salford, England	France	48-4	Friendly
13	11 November 2012	Salford City Stadium, Salford, England	France	48-4	Friendly
14	26 October 2013	Millennium Stadium, Cardiff, Wales	Australia	20-28	2013 World Cup
15	2 November 2013	Kirklees Stadium, Huddersfield, England	Ireland	42-0	2013 World Cup
16	2 November 2013	Kirklees Stadium, Huddersfield, England	Ireland	42-0	2013 World Cup
17	2 November 2013	Kirklees Stadium, Huddersfield, England	Ireland	42-0	2013 World Cup
18	9 November 2013	MKM Stadium, Hull, England	Fiji	34-12	2013 World Cup
19	9 November 2013	MKM Stadium, Hull, England	Fiji	34-12	2013 World Cup
20	16 November 2013	DW Stadium, Wigan, England	France	34-6	2013 World Cup
21	16 November 2013	DW Stadium, Wigan, England	France	34-6	2013 World Cup
22	2 November 2014	Melbourne Rectangular Stadium, Melbourne, Australia	Australia	16-12	2014 Four Nations
23	8 November 2014	Forsyth Barr Stadium, Dunedin, New Zealand	New Zealand	16-14	2014 Four Nations
24	8 November 2014	Forsyth Barr Stadium, Dunedin, New Zealand	New Zealand	16-14	2014 Four Nations
25	24 October 2015	Leigh Sports Village, Leigh, England	France	84-4	Friendly
26	24 October 2015	Leigh Sports Village, Leigh, England	France	84-4	Friendly
27	9 November 2016	Parc des Sports d’Avignon, Avignon, France	France	6-40	Friendly
28	9 November 2016	Parc des Sports d’Avignon, Avignon, France	France	6-40	Friendly
29	29 October 2016	Kirklees Stadium, Huddersfield, England	New Zealand	16-17	2016 Four Nations
30	5 November 2016	Coventry Building Society Arena, Coventry, England	Scotland	38-12	2016 Four Nations
31	13 November 2016	London Stadium, London, England	Australia	18-36	2016 Four Nations
32	6 May 2017	Campbeltown Sports Stadium, Campbeltown, Australia	Samoa	10-30	Friendly
33	4 November 2017	Sydney Football Stadium, Sydney, Australia	Lebanon	29-10	2017 Rugby League World Cup
34	19 November 2017	Melbourne Rectangular Stadium, Melbourne, Australia	Papua New Guinea	36-6	2017 Rugby League World Cup
35	24 June 2018	Mile High Stadium, Denver, USA	New Zealand	36-18	Friendly
36	22 October 2022	University of Bolton Stadium, Bolton, England	France	18-42	2021 World Cup
37	22 October 2022	University of Bolton Stadium, Bolton, England	France	18-42	2021 World Cup
38	29 October 2022	Bramall Lane, Sheffield, England	Greece	94-4	2021 World Cup
39	29 October 2022	Bramall Lane, Sheffield, England	Greece	94-4	2021 World Cup

== Honours ==
=== Club ===
==== Domestic ====
- Super League (6): 2008, 2009, 2011, 2012, 2015, 2017
- Challenge Cup (2): 2014, 2015
  - Runner Up (1): 2023
- League Leaders' Shield (2): 2009, 2015

==== International ====
- World Club Challenge (2): 2008, 2012

=== Representative ===
- World Cup:
  - Runner Up (1): 2017
- Baskerville Shield (1): 2015

=== Individual ===
- Lance Todd Trophy: 2014
- Super League Dream Team: 2009, 2010, 2012, 2014
- Rugby League World XIII: 2011, 2012, 2014
