= England at the Rugby League World Cup =

England have competed eight times in the World Cup; in 1975, 1995, 2000, 2008, 2013, 2017, 2021 and 2026. They have never won the competition, though finished runners-up three times to Australia; in 1975, 1995 and 2017. In every other year, Great Britain have represented England.

== Results ==
World Cup Record
Year	Round	Position	Pld	Win	Draw	Loss
(France) 1954	Competed as (United Kingdom) Great Britain					
(Australia) 1957	Competed as (United Kingdom) Great Britain					
(United Kingdom) 1960	Competed as (United Kingdom) Great Britain					
(Australia) (New Zealand) 1968	Competed as (United Kingdom) Great Britain					
(United Kingdom) 1970	Competed as (United Kingdom) Great Britain					
(France) 1972	Competed as (United Kingdom) Great Britain					
(Australia) (France) (United Kingdom) (New Zealand) 1975	Final	2nd out of 5	9	5	2	2
(Australia) (New Zealand) 1977	Competed as (United Kingdom) Great Britain					
1985-88	Competed as (United Kingdom) Great Britain					
1989-92	Competed as (United Kingdom) Great Britain					
(England) 1995	Final	2nd out of 10	5	4	0	1
(England) (France) (Ireland) (Scotland) (Wales) 2000	Semi-final	4th out of 16	5	3	0	2
(Australia) 2008	Semi-final	3rd out of 10	4	1	0	3
(England) (Wales) 2013	Semi-final	3rd out of 14	5	3	0	2
(Australia) (New Zealand) (Papua New Guinea) 2017	Final	2nd out of 14	6	4	0	2
(England) 2021	Semi-final	3rd out of 16	5	4	0	1
(Australia) (New Zealand) (Papua New Guinea) 2026	Group stage	5th out of 10	3	2	0	1
Total	Runners up	x3	37	22	2	13

England's World Cup record
First match	England 20–2 France (16 March 1975; Leeds, England)
Biggest win	England 94–4 Greece (29 October 2022; Sheffield, England)
Biggest defeat	Australia 52–4 England (2 November 2008; Melbourne, Australia)
Best result	Runners up in 1975, 1996 and 2017
Worst result	Group stage in 2026

== Tournaments ==
Year	Round	Score	Opponents	Venue
(Australia) (France) (United Kingdom) (New Zealand) 1975	Group Stage	20-2	France	Headingley, Leeds
(Australia) (France) (United Kingdom) (New Zealand) 1975	Group Stage	7-12	Wales	Lang Park, Brisbane
(Australia) (France) (United Kingdom) (New Zealand) 1975	Group Stage	17-17	New Zealand	Carlaw Park, Auckland
(Australia) (France) (United Kingdom) (New Zealand) 1975	Group Stage	10-10	Australia	Sydney Cricket Ground, Sydney
(Australia) (France) (United Kingdom) (New Zealand) 1975	Group Stage	22-16	Wales	Wilderspool Stadium, Warrington
(Australia) (France) (United Kingdom) (New Zealand) 1975	Group Stage	48-2	France	Toulouse
(Australia) (France) (United Kingdom) (New Zealand) 1975	Group Stage	27-12	New Zealand	Odsal, Bradford
(Australia) (France) (United Kingdom) (New Zealand) 1975	Group Stage	16-13	Australia	Central Park, Wigan
(Australia) (France) (United Kingdom) (New Zealand) 1975	Final	0-25	Australia	Headingley, Leeds
(England) 1995	Group Stage	20-16	Australia	Wembley Stadium
(England) 1995	Group Stage	46-0	Fiji	Central Park, Wigan
(England) 1995	Group Stage	46-0	South Africa	Headingley, Leeds
(England) 1995	Semi Final	25-10	Wales	Old Trafford, Manchester
(England) 1995	Final	8-16	Australia	Wembley Stadium, London
(England) (France) (Ireland) (Scotland) (Wales) 2000	Group Stage	2-22	Australia	Twickenham Stadium, London
(England) (France) (Ireland) (Scotland) (Wales) 2000	Group Stage	76-4	Russia	Knowsley Road, St Helens
(England) (France) (Ireland) (Scotland) (Wales) 2000	Group Stage	66-0	Fiji	Headingley, Leeds
(England) (France) (Ireland) (Scotland) (Wales) 2000	Quarter Final	26-16	Ireland	Headingley, Leeds
(England) (France) (Ireland) (Scotland) (Wales) 2000	Semi Final	6-49	New Zealand	Reebok Stadium, Bolton
(Australia) 2008	Group Stage	32-22	Papua New Guinea	Willows Sports Complex, Townsville
(Australia) 2008	Group Stage	4-52	Australia	Docklands Stadium, Melbourne
(Australia) 2008	Group Stage	24-36	New Zealand	Newcastle International Sports Centre, Newcastle
(Australia) 2008	Semi Final	22-32	New Zealand	Lang Park, Brisbane
(England) (Wales) 2013	Group Stage	20-28	Australia	Millennium Stadium, Cardiff
(England) (Wales) 2013	Group Stage	42-0	Ireland	John Smiths Stadium, Huddersfield
(England) (Wales) 2013	Group Stage	34-12	Fiji	KC Stadium, Hull
(England) (Wales) 2013	Quarter Final	34-6	France	DW Stadium, Wigan
(England) (Wales) 2013	Semi Final	18-20	New Zealand	Wembley Stadium, London
(Australia) (New Zealand) (Papua New Guinea) 2017	Group Stage	4-18	Australia	Melbourne Rectangular Stadium, Melbourne
(Australia) (New Zealand) (Papua New Guinea) 2017	Group Stage	29-10	Lebanon	Sydney Football Stadium, Sydney
(Australia) (New Zealand) (Papua New Guinea) 2017	Group Stage	36–6	France	Perth Rectangular Stadium, Perth
(Australia) (New Zealand) (Papua New Guinea) 2017	Quarter Final	36-6	Papua New Guinea	Melbourne Rectangular Stadium, Melbourne
(Australia) (New Zealand) (Papua New Guinea) 2017	Semi Final	20 -18	Tonga	Mount Smart Stadium, Auckland
(Australia) (New Zealand) (Papua New Guinea) 2017	Final	0–6	Australia	Lang Park, Brisbane
(England) 2021	Group Stage	66-6	Samoa	St James’ Park, Newcastle
(England) 2021	Group Stage	42-18	France	University of Bolton Stadium, Bolton
(England) 2021	Group Stage	94-4	Greece	Bramall Lane, Sheffield
(England) 2021	Quarter Final	46-6	Papua New Guinea	DW Stadium, Wigan
(England) 2021	Semi Final	26-27; AET (g.p.)	Samoa	Emirates Stadium, London
(Australia) (New Zealand) (Papua New Guinea) 2026	Group Stage	23–30	Tonga	Perth Rectangular Stadium, Perth
(Australia) (New Zealand) (Papua New Guinea) 2026	Group Stage	82–0	France	Perth Rectangular Stadium, Perth
(Australia) (New Zealand) (Papua New Guinea) 2026	Group Stage	34–12	Papua New Guinea	Wollongong Showground, Wollongong

== Players records ==
=== Most appearances at World Cups ===
Rank	Player	Matches	World Cups
1	Chris Hill	15	2013, 2017, 2021
2	Kallum Watkins	13	2013, 2017, 2021
2	James Graham	13	2008, 2013, 2017
3	Ryan Hall	12	2013, 2017, 2021
3	Tom Burgess	12	2013, 2017, 2021
3	James Roby	12	2008, 2013, 2017

=== Most tries at World Cups ===
Rank	Player	Tries	World Cups
1	Ryan Hall	14	2013, 2017, 2021
1	Dom Young	14	2021, 2026
3	Tommy Makinson	7	2021
3	Jermaine McGillvary	7	2017
3	Kallum Watkins	7	2013, 2017, 2021
3	Jamie Peacock	7	2000, 2008
3	Keith Fielding	7	1975
