= List of Super League players with 100 or more tries =

The following is a list of rugby league footballers who have scored at least 100 tries in the Super League competition.

Tries scored in regular season, playoffs, and Super 8's are included. Tries scored in other competitions such as the Challenge Cup or The Qualifiers are excluded.

== Players ==
Statistics correct as of 3 October 2026
Bold indicates players still active in Super League, current club in bold too
Italics indicate player still active but not in Super League

List of rugby league players with 100 or more Super League tries
Rank	Player	Super League club(s)	Years	Tries
1	(England) **Josh Charnley**	Hull KR, Wigan, Warrington, Leigh	2010–2016, 2018–present	281
2	(England) Ryan Hall	Leeds, Hull KR	2007–2018, 2021–2026	274
3	(England) Danny McGuire	Leeds, Hull KR	2001–2019	247
4	(England) Tommy Makinson	St Helens, Catalans	2011–2026	210
5=	(England) Paul Wellens	St Helens	1998–2015	199
5=	(England) Keith Senior	Sheffield, Leeds	1996–2011	199
7	(England) Jermaine McGillvary	Huddersfield	2010–2023	196
8	(England) Ryan Atkins	Bradford, Wakefield, Warrington	2005–2020	186
9	(England) Tom Briscoe	Hull F.C., Leeds, Leigh	2008–2026	182
10	(England) Leon Pryce	Bradford, St Helens, Catalans, Hull F.C.	1998–2016	173
11	(Australia) Luke Dorn	London Broncos, Salford, Castleford	2005–2016	170
12	(England) **Liam Marshall**	Wigan	2017–present	169
13=	(England) Rob Burrow	Leeds	2001–2017	168
13=	(England) David Hodgson	Halifax, Wigan, Salford, Huddersfield, Hull KR	1999–2014	168
15	(England) Sam Tomkins	Wigan, Catalans	2009–2013, 2016–2025	167
16	(England) **Joe Burgess**	Wigan, Salford, Hull KR, Catalans	2013–2015, 2017–present	165
17	(England) Kirk Yeaman	Hull F.C.	2001–2016, 2018	160
18	(Ireland) Pat Richards	Wigan, Catalans	2006–2013, 2016	155
19	(England) Ade Gardner	St Helens, Hull KR	2002–2014	153
20	(England) **Tom Johnstone**	Wakefield, Catalans	2017–present	150
21	(England) **Adam Swift**	St Helens, Hull F.C., Huddersfield	2012–present	146
22	(England) (Ireland) Richie Myler	Salford, Warrington, Catalans, Leeds	2009–2023	145
23	(England) **Kallum Watkins**	Leeds, Salford	2007–2019, 2020–present	143
24=	(England) Greg Eden	Castleford, Huddersfield, Hull KR, Salford, Bradford	2011–2015, 2017–2023, 2026	138
24=	(Australia) Joel Monaghan	Warrington, Castleford	2011–2017	138
24=	(Wales) Keiron Cunningham	St Helens	1996–2010	138
27	(New Zealand) Lesley Vainikolo	Bradford	2002–2007	136
28=	(England) Liam Farrell	Wigan	2010–2026	134
28=	(England) (Jamaica) **Ben Jones-Bishop**	Leeds, London Broncos, Salford, Wakefield, York	2008–2020, 2026-present	134
28=	(England) Jonny Lomax	St Helens	2009–2026	134
28=	(England) Kris Radlinski	Wigan	1996–2006	134
32	(Samoa) (New Zealand) Francis Meli	St Helens, Salford	2006–2014	133
33	(England) Sean Long	Wigan, St Helens, Hull F.C.	1996–2011	132
34=	(England) **Ash Handley**	Leeds	2014–present	130
34=	(New Zealand) Robbie Paul	Bradford, Huddersfield, Salford	1996–2009	130
34=	(Wales) Lee Briers	St. Helens, Warrington	1997–2013	130
37	(England) Michael Shenton	Castleford, St Helens	2004, 2006, 2008–2021	126
38	(England) Tom Lineham	Hull F.C., Warrington, Wakefield	2012–2023	123
39=	(England) Leroy Cudjoe	Huddersfield	2008–2025	120
39=	(England) Kevin Brown	Wigan, Huddersfield, Widnes, Warrington, Salford	2003–2021	120
39=	(England) (Ireland) Francis Cummins	Leeds	1996–2005	120
39=	(England) Chris Riley	Warrington, London Broncos, Wakefield	2005–2015	120
43=	(England) Ben Westwood	Wakefield, Warrington	1999–2019	119
43=	(England) Mark Calderwood	Leeds, Wigan, Hull F.C., London Broncos	2001–2011	119
45	(England) Kris Welham	Hull KR, Salford	2007–2015, 2017–2020	117
46=	(Australia) **Bevan French**	Wigan	2019-present	115
46=	(England) Mark Percival	St Helens	2013–2026	115
46=	(Scotland) Richard Horne	Hull F.C.	1999–2014	115
49=	(England) **Tom Davies**	Wigan, Catalans, Hull KR	2017-present	114
49=	(England) Martin Gleeson	Huddersfield, St Helens, Warrington, Wigan, Hull F.C., Salford	1999–2014	114
51=	(England) Stefan Ratchford	Salford, Warrington	2007, 2009–2025	110
51=	(England) Gareth Raynor	Leeds, Hull F.C., Crusaders, Bradford	2000–2011	110
53=	(England) Jodie Broughton	Hull F.C., Salford, Huddersfield, Catalans	2008–2019	109
53=	(New Zealand) Toa Kohe-Love	Warrington, Hull F.C., Bradford	1996–2006	109
55	(England) **Niall Evalds**	Salford, Castleford, Hull KR, Huddersfield	2013–present	108
56=	(England) **Zak Hardaker**	Leeds, Castleford, Wigan, Leigh, Hull F.C., York	2011–2017, 2019-present	107
56=	(England) Paul Newlove	St Helens, Castleford	1996–2004	107
56=	(England) Danny Orr	Castleford, Wigan, London Broncos	1997–2012	107
59=	(England) James Roby	St Helens	2004–2023	105
59=	(Wales) Anthony Sullivan	St Helens	1996–2001	105
61	(England) (Jamaica) Jordan Turner	Salford, Hull, St Helens, Huddersfield, Castleford	2006–2007, 2009–2023	104
62	(England) Craig Hall	Hull F.C., Hull KR, Wakefield	2008–2016, 2018–2019	103
63=	(England) **Matty Ashton**	Warrington	2020–present	102
63=	(Scotland) Lee Gilmour	Wigan, Bradford, St Helens, Huddersfield, Castleford, Wakefield	1997–2014	102
65	(Australia) Ken Sio	Hull KR, Salford	2015–2016, 2019–2023	101
66	(England) Paul Sculthorpe	Warrington, St Helens	1996–2008	100

== Players to score 100 Super League tries and 300 Super League goals ==
Reached In	Tries	Goals	Player	Club(s) played for	Career span
2005	132	827	Sean Long	Wigan, St. Helens, Hull F.C.	1996–2011
2008	100	356	Paul Sculthorpe	Warrington, St. Helens	1996–2008
2010	130	823	Lee Briers	St. Helens, Warrington,	1996–2013
2011	155	828	Pat Richards	Wigan, Catalans	2006–2013, 2016
2011	107	413	Danny Orr	Castleford, Wigan, London Broncos, Castleford	1997–2012
2022	110	627	Stefan Ratchford	Salford, Warrington	2007, 2009–2025
2024	115	380	Mark Percival	St Helens	2013–2026
2025	107	360	Zak Hardaker	Leeds. Castleford, Wigan, Leigh, Hull F.C., York	2011–2017, 2019-present
