= Super League Grand Final =

Championship-deciding game of rugby league's Super League competition

- The Super League Trophy ahead of the 2012 Grand Final
- Other names: The Big Dance
- Location: (England) Trafford, Greater Manchester
- Teams: 2
- First meeting: 1998
- Latest meeting: 2026
- Next meeting: 2027
- Broadcasters: Sky Sports; BBC (highlights)
- Stadiums: Old Trafford

Statistics
- Total meetings: 29
- Most wins: St Helens (10)
- Most player appearances: (England) Jamie Peacock (England) James Roby (11)

The Super League Grand Final is the championship-deciding game of rugby league's Super League competition. It is played between two teams who have qualified via the Super League play-offs. The winning team receives the Super League Trophy and goes on to play the NRL champions in the World Club Challenge. As of 2024, the Rob Burrow Award is awarded to the man of the match, replacing the Harry Sunderland Trophy. The match is normally played at Old Trafford in Greater Manchester.

Six clubs have won the Super League, as of 2026 – St Helens (10), Leeds Rhinos (8), Wigan Warriors (7), Bradford Bulls (4), Hull KR (1) and Wakefield Trinity (1). St Helens and Bradford Bulls each won one of their Super League titles before the Play Off and Grand Final system was introduced in 1998.

Wakefield Trinity are the current champions, after winning the 2026 Super League Grand Final, defeating Warrington Wolves 23–10, to win their first title since 1968.

== Background ==
Use of a play-off system to decide the Championship brought back a rugby league tradition that had fallen out of use in the 1970s, 1980s, and 1990s. The Premiership replaced the Championship final but it was to decide the Premiership winners, not the Championship winners. The Premiership was discontinued after the introduction of the Super League play-off series in 1998, ending with the Super League Grand Final, the concept inspired by the NRL Grand Final in Australia. The inaugural Grand Final match was played that year on Saturday 24 October, between Wigan Warriors and Leeds Rhinos.

== Venue ==
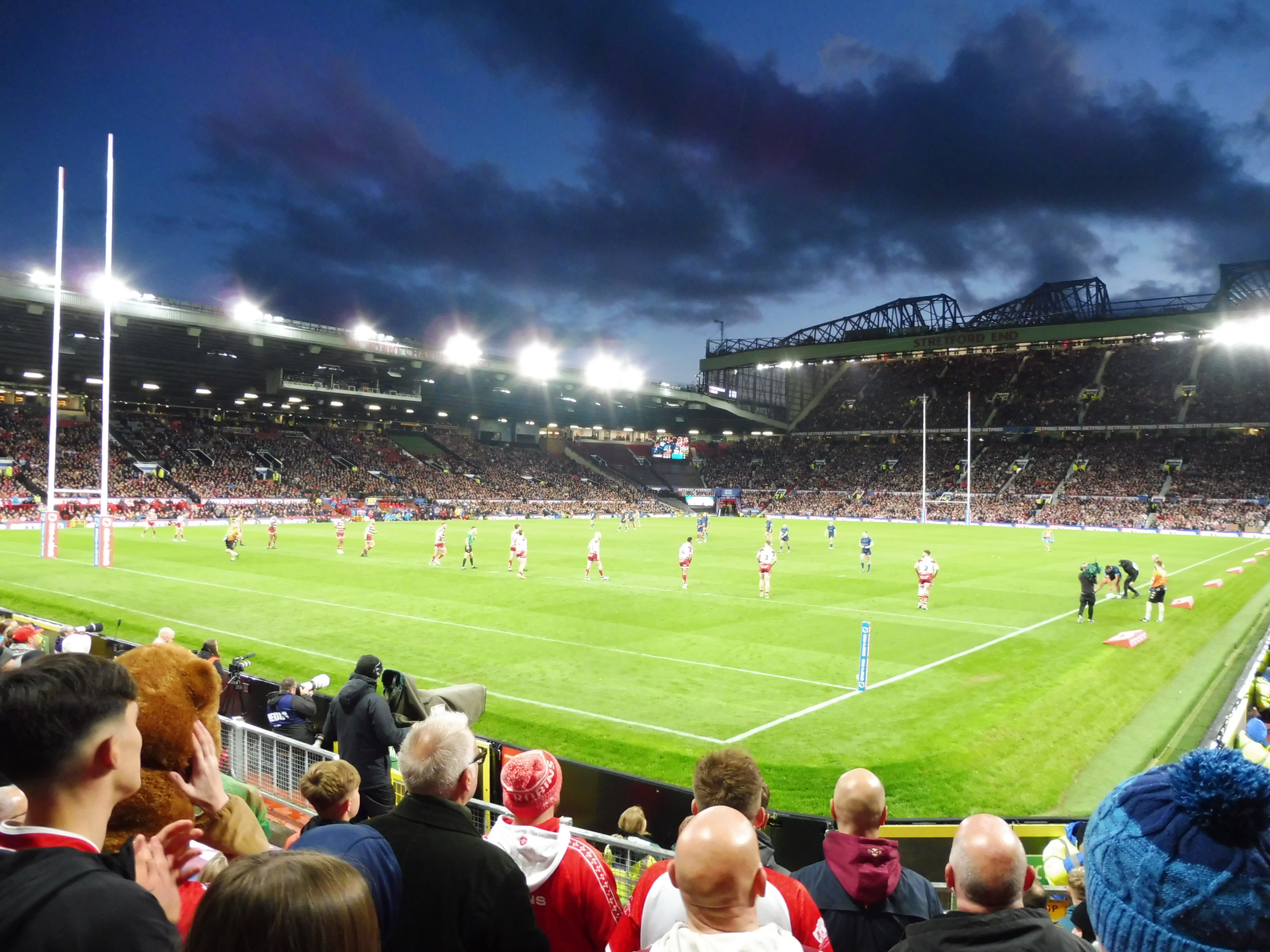
Wigan Warriors vs Hull KR at the 2024 Super League Grand Final

The Grand Final has been held on a Saturday at Old Trafford in Manchester every year since 1998. The only exception to this was the 2020 final, which as a result of the COVID-19 pandemic causing fixture congestion with Manchester United F.C.'s 2020–21 season, was rescheduled to be held at the KCOM Stadium in Kingston upon Hull. The match was also held on a Friday night for the first and only time in its history.

City	Stadium	Years
(England) Manchester	Old Trafford	1998–2019, 2021–2027
(England) Hull	KCOM Stadium	2020

== Trophy ==
The winners of the Super League collect the Grand Final rings and the team's name, captain and year are engraved into the trophy. The winners also collect £100,000 with the runner up collecting £50,000.

Leeds captain Kevin Sinfield currently holds the record for captaining the most Super League title winning sides after leading Leeds to seven of their Grand Final successes. St Helens contested the final six consecutive seasons (from 2006 until 2011) during which time they succeeded only once in lifting the trophy, against Hull F.C. in 2006, after which they suffered consecutive defeats against Leeds in 2007, 2008, 2009, Wigan in 2010 and Leeds once again in 2011.

== Awards ==
The Rob Burrow Award is awarded to the Man-of-the-Match in the Super League Grand Final by the Rugby League Writers' Association. The award was introduced in tribute to Rob Burrow for the 2024 Grand Final; Burrow, who won eight grand finals with Leeds Rhinos and has been awarded the Harry Sunderland award himself twice (2007 & 2011), died in June 2024 of Motor Neurone Disease. The inaugural Rob Burrow Award was handed to Wigan Warriors stand-off Bevan French by Rob Burrow's father Geoff Burrow following the conclusion of the 2024 final on 12 October.

Before 2024, the trophy was named the Harry Sunderland Trophy in tribute to Harry Sunderland, who was an Australian rugby league football administrator in both Australia and the United Kingdom. The Trophy was first awarded in the Rugby Football League Championship Final of the 1964–65 season following Sunderland's death and was retained with the introduction of the Super League Grand Final in 1998.

== Finals ==
The Super League Grand Final has been the championship-deciding game since Super League III in 1998:

Year	Winners	Score	Runner-up	Attendance
1998	Wigan Warriors	10–4	Leeds Rhinos	43,533
1999	St Helens	8–6	Bradford Bulls	▲50,717
2000	St Helens	29–16	Wigan Warriors	▲58,132
2001	Bradford Bulls	37–6	Wigan Warriors	▲60,164
2002	St Helens	19–18	Bradford Bulls	▲61,138
2003	Bradford Bulls	25–12	Wigan Warriors	▲65,537
2004	Leeds Rhinos	16–8	Bradford Bulls	▲65,547
2005	Bradford Bulls	15–6	Leeds Rhinos	▲65,728
2006	St Helens	26–4	Hull F.C.	▲72,575
2007	Leeds Rhinos	33–6	St Helens	▼71,352
2008	Leeds Rhinos	24–16	St Helens	▼68,810
2009	Leeds Rhinos	18–10	St Helens	▼63,259
2010	Wigan Warriors	22–10	St Helens	▲71,526
2011	Leeds Rhinos	32–16	St Helens	▼69,107
2012	Leeds Rhinos	26–18	Warrington Wolves	▲70,676
2013	Wigan Warriors	30–16	Warrington Wolves	▼66,281
2014	St Helens	14–6	Wigan Warriors	▲70,102
2015	Leeds Rhinos	22–20	Wigan Warriors	▲73,512
2016	Wigan Warriors	12–6	Warrington Wolves	▼70,202
2017	Leeds Rhinos	24–6	Castleford Tigers	▲72,827
2018	Wigan Warriors	12–4	Warrington Wolves	▼64,892
2019	St Helens	23–6	Salford Red Devils	▼64,102
2020	St Helens	8–4	Wigan Warriors	0 (Note: Played behind closed doors due to the COVID-19 pandemic)
2021	St Helens	12–10	Catalans Dragons	▼45,177
2022	St Helens	24–12	Leeds Rhinos	▲60,783
2023	Wigan Warriors	10–2	Catalans Dragons	▼58,137
2024	Wigan Warriors	9–2	Hull Kingston Rovers	▲68,173
2025	Hull Kingston Rovers	24–6	Wigan Warriors	▲68,853
2026	Wakefield Trinity	23–10	Warrington Wolves	▲71,728

=== Results ===
Grand Final winners and runners up
Club	Winners	Runners-up	Years won	Years runner-up
St Helens	9	5	1999, 2000, 2002, 2006, 2014, 2019, 2020, 2021, 2022	2007, 2008, 2009, 2010, 2011
Leeds Rhinos	8	3	2004, 2007, 2008, 2009, 2011, 2012, 2015, 2017	1998, 2005, 2022
Wigan Warriors	7	7	1998, 2010, 2013, 2016, 2018, 2023, 2024	2000, 2001, 2003, 2014, 2015, 2020, 2025
Bradford Bulls	3	3	2001, 2003, 2005	1999, 2002, 2004
Hull Kingston Rovers	1	1	2025	2024
Wakefield Trinity	1	0	2026	
Warrington Wolves	0	5		2012, 2013, 2016, 2018, 2026
Catalans Dragons	0	2		2021, 2023
Hull F.C.	0	1		2006
Castleford Tigers	0	1		2017
Salford Red Devils	0	1		2019

=== The Double ===
	Club	Wins	Winning years
1	Wigan Warriors	8	1990–91, 1991–92, 1992–93, 1993–94, 1994–95, 1995–96, 2013, 2024
2	St. Helens	4	1965–66, 1996, 2006, 2021
3	Huddersfield Giants	2	1912–13, 1914–15
4	Swinton Lions	1	1927–28
4	Broughton Rangers	1	1901–02
4	Halifax Panthers	1	1902–03
4	Hunslet F.C.	1	1907–08
4	Bradford Bulls	1	2003
4	Leeds Rhinos	1	2015
4	Hull Kingston Rovers	1	2025

=== The Treble ===
	Club	Wins	Winning years
1	Wigan Warriors	4	1991–92, 1993–94, 1994–95, 2024
2	Huddersfield Giants	2	1912–13, 1914–15
2	St. Helens	2	1965–66, 2006
4	Swinton Lions	1	1927–28
4	Bradford Bulls	1	2003
4	Leeds Rhinos	1	2015
4	Hull Kingston Rovers	1	2025

=== The Quadruple ===
	Club	Wins	Winning years
1	Wigan Warriors	2 (Note: Wigan have a widely misreported quadruple in 1994–95, with the club winning the treble in addition to the 1994–95 Regal Trophy. Note: No World Club Challenge was held in 1995 as it did not become a regular competition until 2000.)	1993–94, 2024 (Note: This is the first widely reported quadruple to include the calendar year's World Club Challenge and not the following season's. Note: The 2025 World Club Challenge was abandoned by Penrith Panthers, although no title was awarded for 2025, Wigan, without challenge, retained their title for a second year.)
2	Bradford Bulls	1	2003
2	St. Helens	1	2006
2	Hull Kingston Rovers	1	2026

== Pre-match entertainment ==
Year	Act
1998	None
1999	None
2000	None
2001	None
2002	None
2003	None
2004	Heather Small
2005	Madness
2006	Deacon Blue
2007	Björn Again
2008	Scouting for Girls
2009	The Wombats
2010	Diana Vickers
2011	Feeder (Note: Feeder were cancelled due to Manchester United not wanting a stage to be erected on a wet pitch)
2012	None
2013	None
2014	James
2015	The Charlatans
2016	Feeder
2017	Razorlight
2018	Blossoms
2019	Shed Seven
2020	None
2021	None
2022	None
2023	Reverend and the Makers
2024	The Lathums
2025	The Pigeon Detectives

== Match records ==
- Largest margin of victory: 31 points

Bradford 37–6 Wigan (2001)

- Smallest margin of victory: 1 point

St Helens 19–18 Bradford (2002)

- Highest scoring: 48 points

Leeds 32–16 St Helens (2011)

- Lowest scoring: 11 points

Wigan Warriors 9–2 Hull KR (2024)

- Highest attendance: 73,512

Leeds vs Wigan (2015)

- Lowest attendance: 43,533

Leeds vs Wigan (1998)

== See also ==
- Championship Grand Final
- Million Pound Game
- Super League
- Super League play-offs
- Old Trafford
- Super League Trophy
- Harry Sunderland Trophy
- NRL Grand Final
