= Jamie Peacock =

Great Britain and England international rugby league player

Jamie Peacock MBE
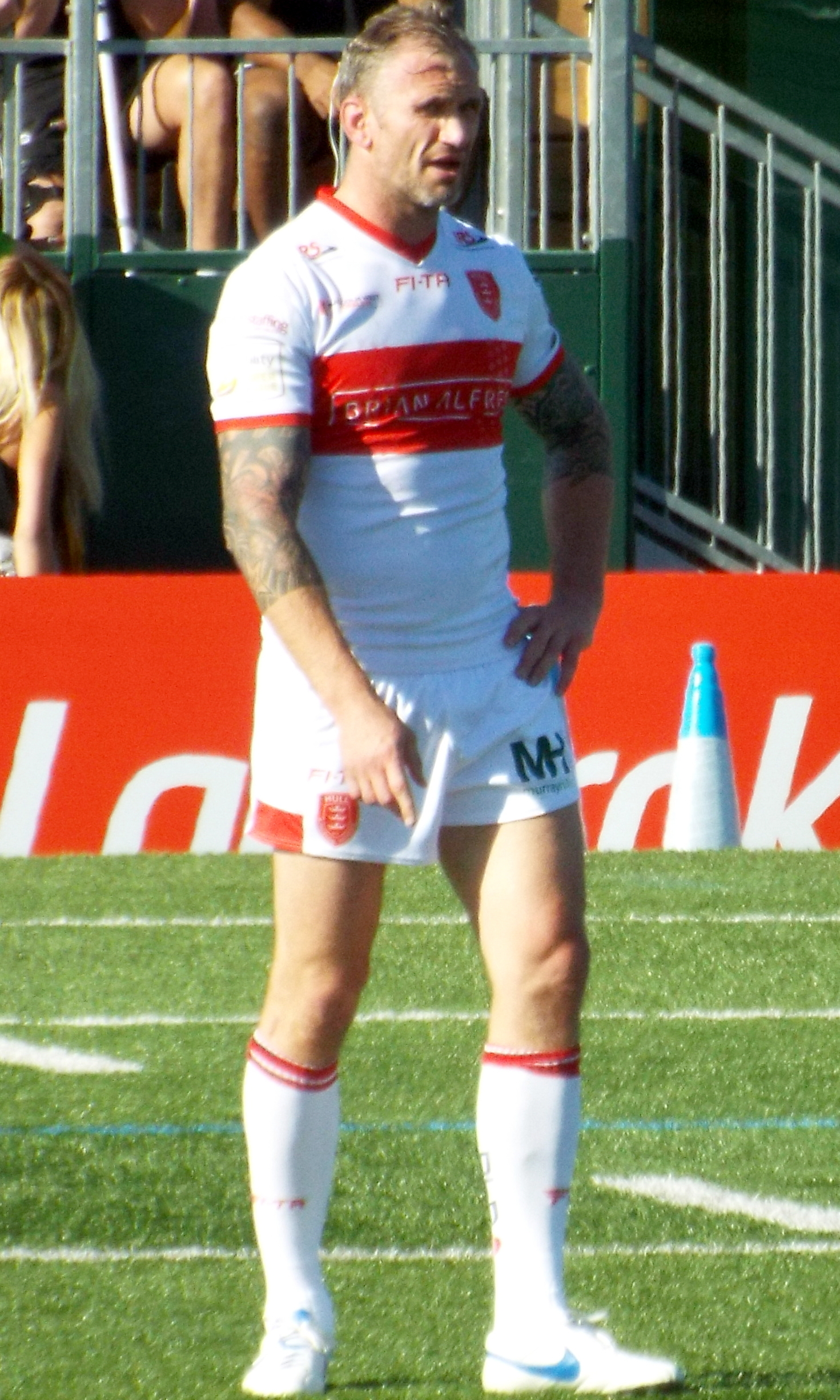

Personal information
- Full name: James Darryl Peacock
- Born: 14 December 1977 (age 48) Bramley, Leeds, West Yorkshire, England

Playing information
- Height: 6 ft 5 in (196 cm)
- Weight: 16 st 7 lb (105 kg)
- Position: Prop, Second-row
Club
Years	Team	Pld	T	G	FG	P
1998–05	Bradford Bulls	207	42	0	0	168
1998(loan)	→ Featherstone Rovers	4	1	0	0	4
2006–15	Leeds Rhinos	289	26	0	0	104
2016	Hull Kingston Rovers	4	0	0	0	0
	Total	504	69	0	0	276
Representative
Years	Team	Pld	T	G	FG	P
2000–11	England	21	8	0	0	32
2001–07	Great Britain	26	4	0	0	16
2001–03	Yorkshire	4	0	0	0	0

James Darryl Peacock MBE, (born 14 December 1977) is an English motivational speaker, leadership mentor and former professional rugby league footballer.

Peacock began his career with Bradford Bulls in 1998, which also included a loan spell at Featherstone Rovers, he made a name for himself playing in the second-row winning three Grand Finals before a move to Leeds Rhinos in 2006. At Leeds, Peacock won six more Grand Finals and became one of the most decorated players in British rugby league history. After briefly returning in 2015 Peacock played four games for Hull Kingston Rovers in 2016.

Peacock made his England debut at the 2000 World Cup and his Great Britain debut the following year as well as representing Yorkshire.

== Background ==
Born in Leeds, Peacock is a product of Bradford Bulls' junior programme, having played as a junior for Stanningley RLFC. On his way to becoming a first team regular for Bradford, Jamie spent a month on loan at Featherstone Rovers making four appearances and scoring one try. He also enjoyed a spell at University of Wollongong in Australia as he learned his rugby trade.

== Club career ==
=== Bradford ===
Peacock made his Bradford Super League début in 1999. He made two starts and 16 substitute appearances for the club, scoring six tries that year. The following year he cemented his place in the side, helping Bradford to win 2000 Challenge Cup success against Leeds at Murrayfield.

Peacock played for the Bradford Bulls as a second-row in their 2001 Super League Grand Final victory against the Wigan Warriors.

As Super League VI champions, the Bulls played against 2001 NRL Premiers, the Newcastle Knights in the 2002 World Club Challenge. Peacock played as a second-row in Bradford's victory. He made 30 appearances in 2002 as Bradford again returned to Old Trafford for the 2002 Super League Grand Final only to lose out to a Sean Long drop goal.

Peacock played for the Bradford Bulls as a second-row in their 2003 Super League Grand Final victory against the Wigan Warriors. Having won Super League VIII, Bradford played against 2003 NRL Premiers, the Penrith Panthers in the 2004 World Club Challenge. Peacock captained the Bulls as a second-row in their 22–4 victory. Bradford reached the 2004 Super League Grand Final losing out to Leeds. Peacock was honoured with the captaincy at Bradford Bulls in his final year at Odsal and played for the Bulls as a prop in their 2005 Super League Grand Final victory against Leeds Rhinos at Old Trafford.

During his time with Bradford he won every club honour available, in addition to winning the Man of Steel, Players' Player of the Year and Rugby League Writers' Player of the Year.

=== Leeds ===
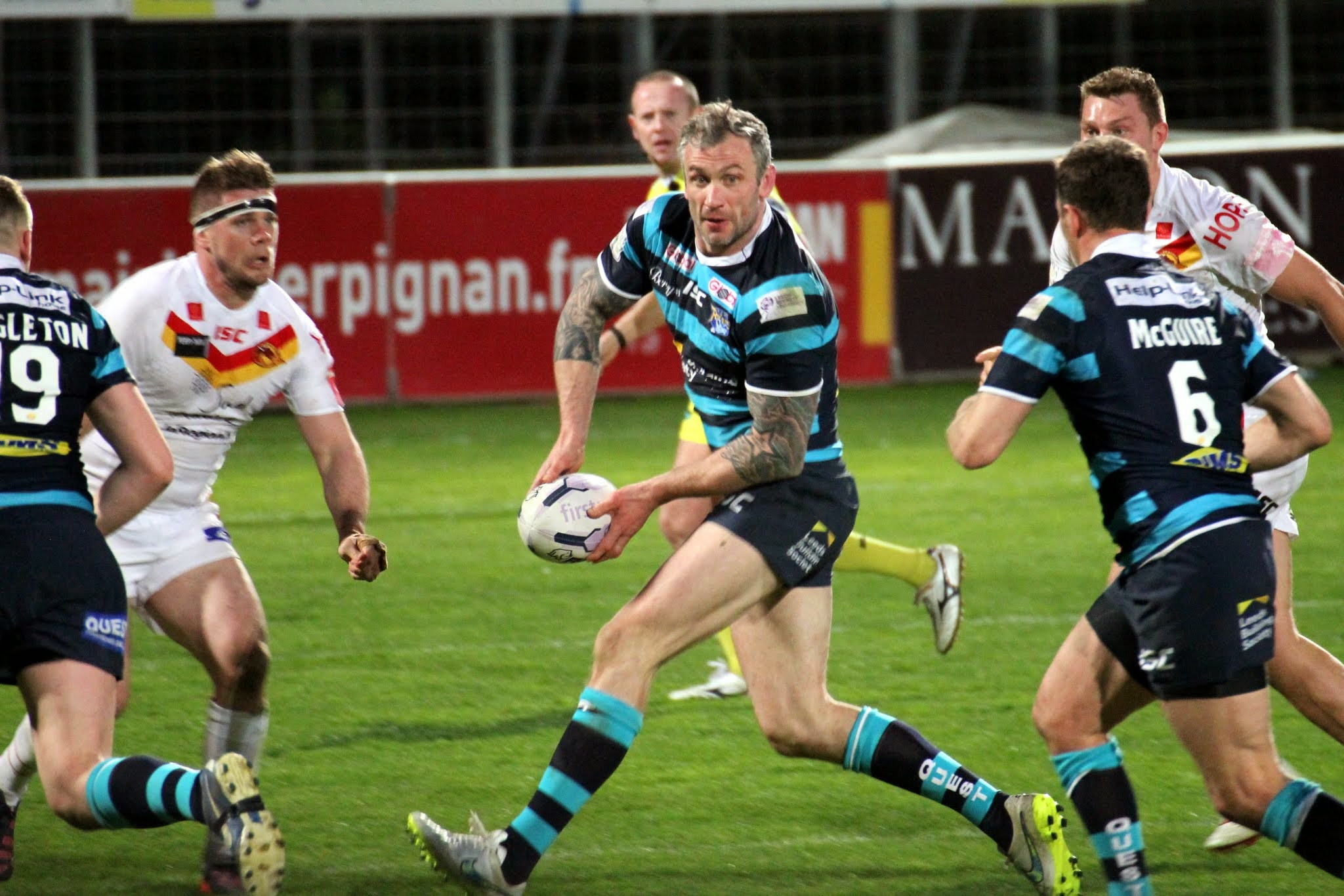
Peacock playing for Leeds in 2015

Peacock joined Leeds in 2006 from local rivals Bradford. He made his Leeds début against Huddersfield on the opening day of the season.

He played in the 2008 Super League Grand Final victory over St. Helens. and was also part of the 2007, 2009, 2011 and 2012 Super League Grand Final squads and team that won the World Club Challenge against Manly Sea Eagles.

Peacock played a starring role in Leeds' 33-6 Grand Final victory over then reigning champions' St Helens. He played a full 80 minutes to win his 4th Super League champions ring.

He was named in the Super League Dream Team for both the 2008's Super League XIII and 2009's Super League XIV season.

He played in the 2009 Super League Grand Final victory over St. Helens at Old Trafford.

Peacock signed a new one-year deal at Leeds in July 2011.

Later that year he played as a prop for Leeds in the 2011 Challenge Cup Final defeat by the Wigan Warriors at Wembley Stadium.

He played in the 2011 Super League Grand Final victory over St. Helens at Old Trafford.

Peacock was appointed Member of the Order of the British Empire (MBE) in the 2012 New Year Honours for services to rugby league.

He played in the 2012 Challenge Cup Final defeat by the Warrington Wolves at Wembley Stadium.

He played in the 2012 Super League Grand Final victory over the Warrington Wolves at Old Trafford.

He enjoyed a resurgence the following season, and was once again named in the Super League Dream Team in 2013, 2014, and 2015.

Peacock played in the 2014 Challenge Cup Final victory over the Castleford Tigers at Wembley Stadium.

He played in the 2015 Challenge Cup Final victory over Hull Kingston Rovers at Wembley Stadium.

Peacock announced that he would retire from the sport upon the conclusion of the 2015 season joining Hull Kingston Rovers as a coach.

He played in the 2015 Super League Grand Final victory over the Wigan Warriors at Old Trafford.

=== Hull Kingston Rovers ===
Peacock joined Hull KR as a coach for the 2016 Super League season. At the end of the regular season Hull KR finished 11th thus played in the 2016 Qualifiers. Towards the conclusion of the season, Peacock came out of retirement taking up the role of a player-coach due to squad injuries.

== International career ==
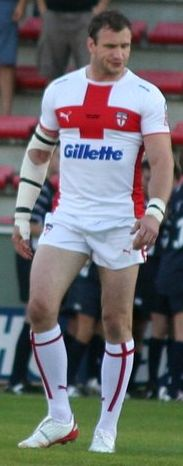
Peacock representing England in 2008.

Peacock earned himself a place in John Kear's England side for the 2000 World Cup. He made four appearances in the World Cup that year, scoring an impressive six tries which including a hat trick against Fiji at Headingley.

Peacock played for England in 2001 against Wales. Also in 2001, he capped the season by making his Great Britain début against Australia scoring a try after just 86 seconds of his début in the first test victory at Huddersfield. He then become a permanent presence in the Great Britain squad making 14 appearances, all but three of which have been in the starting line up. Peacock won caps for Great Britain while at Bradford Bulls in 2001 against Australia (2 matches), and Australia (sub), in 2002 against Australia, New Zealand, and New Zealand (sub) (2 matches), in 2003 against Australia (3 matches), in 2004 against Australia (3 matches), and New Zealand, in 2005 against Australia (2 matches), and New Zealand (2 matches).

Peacock was then selected in the Great Britain team to compete in the end of season 2004 Rugby League Tri-Nations tournament. In the final against Australia he played as a second-row in the Lions' 44–4 loss.

Peacock played for Great Britain while at Leeds in 2006 against New Zealand (3 matches), and Australia (2 matches), in 2007 against New Zealand (3 matches).

He played for England in 2008 against France. On 16 June 2008, Peacock was announced as the England captain for the 2008 Rugby League World Cup in Australia. In Group A's first match against Papua New Guinea he played as a prop in England's victory. He played against Papua New Guinea, Australia, and New Zealand (2 matches), in 2009 against France (2 matches), New Zealand and Australia.

He was selected to play for England against France in the one-off test in 2010.

On 26 June 2012, Peacock announced his retirement from international rugby league.

== Career stats ==
Appearances and try's by national team and year
National team	Year	Apps	Tries
England	2000	4	6
England	2001	1	1
England	2008	5	1
England	2009	5	0
England	2010	1	0
England	2011	6	0
England	2012	1	0
England Total		22	8
Great Britain
Great Britain	2001	3	1
Great Britain	2002	4	1
Great Britain	2003	3	0
Great Britain	2004	4	0
Great Britain	2005	4	0
Great Britain	2006	5	1
Great Britain	2007	3	1
Great Britain Total		26	4
Career Total		48	12

== Honours ==
=== Club ===
Bradford

- Super League (3): 2001, 2003, 2005
- Challenge Cup (2): 2000, 2003
- World Club Challenge (2): 2002, 2004
- League Leaders' Shield (3): 1999, 2001, 2003

Leeds

- Super League (6): 2007, 2008, 2009, 2011, 2012, 2015
- Challenge Cup (2): 2014, 2015
- World Club Challenge (2): 2008, 2012
- League Leaders' Shield (2): 2009, 2015

=== Individual ===
- Man of Steel Award: 2003

=== Orders and special awards ===
- Member of the Order of the British Empire (MBE): 2012

== Other work ==
Since retiring from rugby, Peacock has become a motivational speaker, including aspects of leadership mentoring and delivering keynote speeches for businesses. He developed a fifty-day "Building Champions" mentoring programme in 2016, which over 1000 people have completed, as well as the "Be A Champion" wellbeing programme, which has an accompanying book.

Peacock also makes media appearances providing insight and opinion on rugby.

== Personal life ==
Peacock resides in Leeds, England and is the father of three children from his previous marriage.

He released his autobiography No White Flag in 2008, co-written with Phil Caplan.
