= 2008 Super League Grand Final =

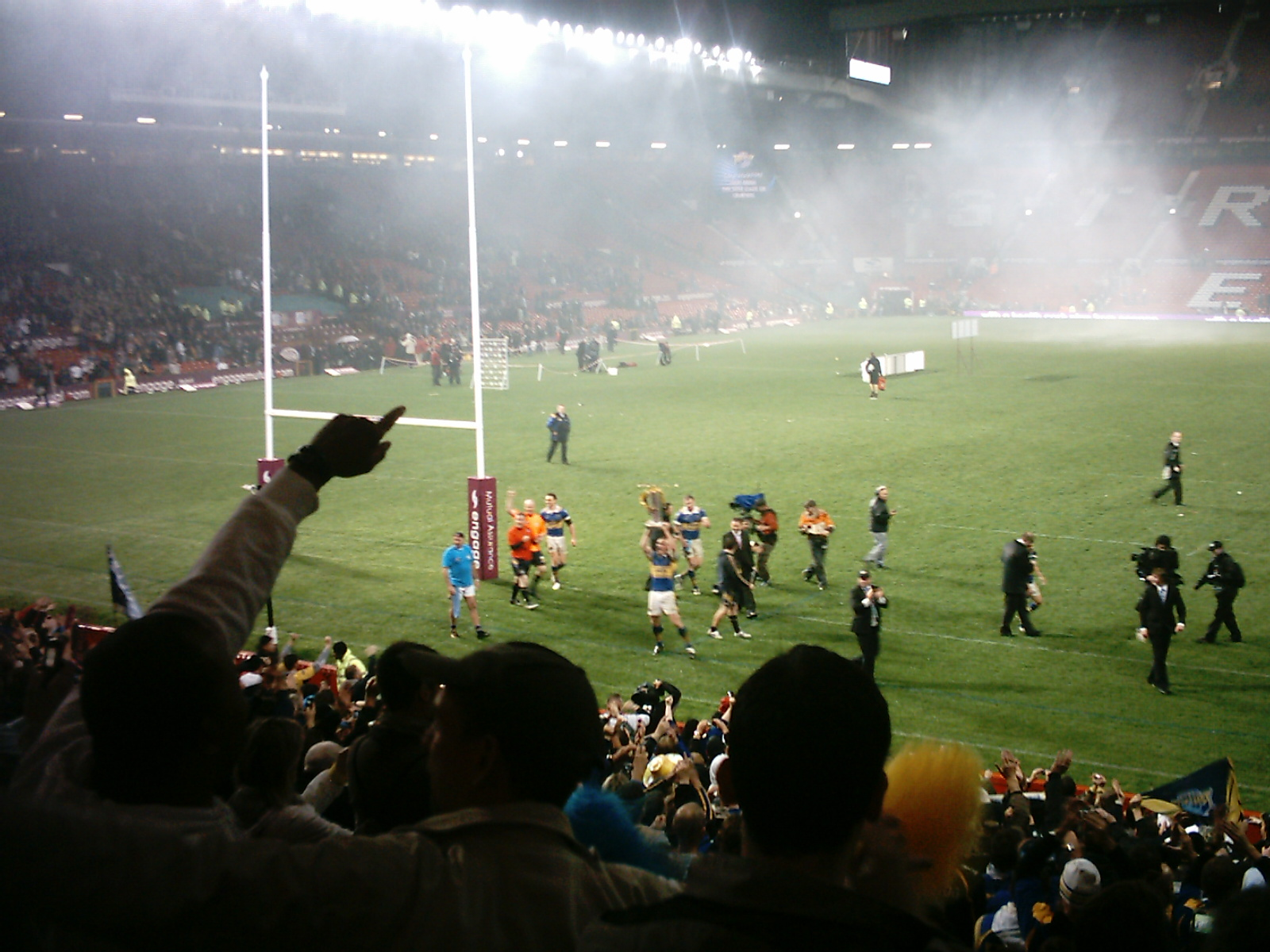
- Leeds Rhinos celebrating their victory after the full-time whistle
St. Helens	Leeds Rhinos
16	24
	1	2	Total
ST H	6	10	16
LEE	12	12	24
- Date: 4 October 2008
- Stadium: Old Trafford
- Location: (England) Manchester
- Harry Sunderland Trophy: (England) Lee Smith ( Leeds Rhinos)
- Headliners: Scouting for Girls
- Referee: Ashley Klein
- Attendance: 68,810

Broadcast partners
- Broadcasters: Sky Sports
- Commentators: Eddie Hemmings; Mike Stephenson

The 2008 Super League Grand Final was the 11th official grand final and conclusive and championship-deciding match of the Super League XIII season. Held on Saturday 4 October 2008, at Old Trafford, Manchester, the match was between League Leaders St. Helens and defending champions from 2007 Leeds Rhinos.

== Background ==
	Team	Pld	W	D	L	PF	PA	PD	Pts
1	St. Helens	27	21	1	5	940	457	+483	43
2	Leeds Rhinos	27	21	0	6	863	413	+450	42

=== Route to the Final ===
==== St Helens ====
Round	Opposition	Score
Qualifying Semi-Final	Leeds Rhinos (H)	38–10
Key: (H) = Home venue; (A) = Away venue; (N) = Neutral venue.

==== Leeds Rhinos ====
Round	Opposition	Score
Qualifying Semi-Final	St Helens (A)	38–10
Elimination Final	Wigan Warriors (H)	18–14
Key: (H) = Home venue; (A) = Away venue; (N) = Neutral venue.

== Match details ==
4 October 2008
18:00 UTC+1

St. Helens	16–24	Leeds Rhinos
Tries: Graham 6'; Gidley 43'; Gardner 59'; Goals: Long (2)	Report	Tries: Smith 24'; Hall 37'; McGuire 49', 63'; Goals: Sinfield (4)

Old Trafford, Manchester
Attendance: 68,810
Referee: Ashley Klein (Australia)

St Helens		Position	Leeds Rhinos	
1	(England) Paul Wellens	Fullback	5	(England) Lee Smith
2	(England) Ade Gardner	Winger	22	(England) Ryan Hall
3	(Australia) Matthew Gidley	Centre	19	(England) Carl Ablett
4	(Samoa) Willie Talau	Centre	4	(England) Keith Senior
5	(Samoa) Francis Meli	Winger	2	(Australia) Scott Donald
6	(England) Leon Pryce	Stand Off	6	(England) Danny McGuire
7	(England) Sean Long	Scrum half	7	(England) Rob Burrow
17	(England) James Graham	Prop	8	(New Zealand) Kylie Leuluai
9	(Wales) Keiron Cunningham (c)	Hooker	9	(England) Matt Diskin
18	(England) Bryn Hargreaves	Prop	10	(England) Jamie Peacock
11	(England) Lee Gilmour	2nd Row	11	(England) Jamie Jones-Buchanan
12	(England) Jon Wilkin	2nd Row	12	(England) Gareth Ellis
30	(England) Chris Flannery	Loose forward	13	(England) Kevin Sinfield (c)
14	(England) James Roby	Interchange	14	(New Zealand) Ali Lauitiiti
8	(England) Nick Fozzard	Interchange	16	(England) Ryan Bailey
28	(England) Paul Clough	Interchange	17	(England) Nick Scruton
23	(Samoa) Maurie Fa'asavalu	Interchange	18	(England) Ian Kirke
	(Australia) Daniel Anderson	Coach		(New Zealand) Brian McClennan

The coin to see who kicked off was tossed by 12-year-old, James Baxter who won the opportunity through a competition through the leagues sponsor Engage.

== 2009 World Club Challenge ==
The Rhinos' win in the grand final earned them the right to play against the 2008 NRL season premiers, the Manly-Warringah Sea Eagles on 1 March 2009 in the World Club Challenge.
