= Nick Scruton =

England international rugby league footballer

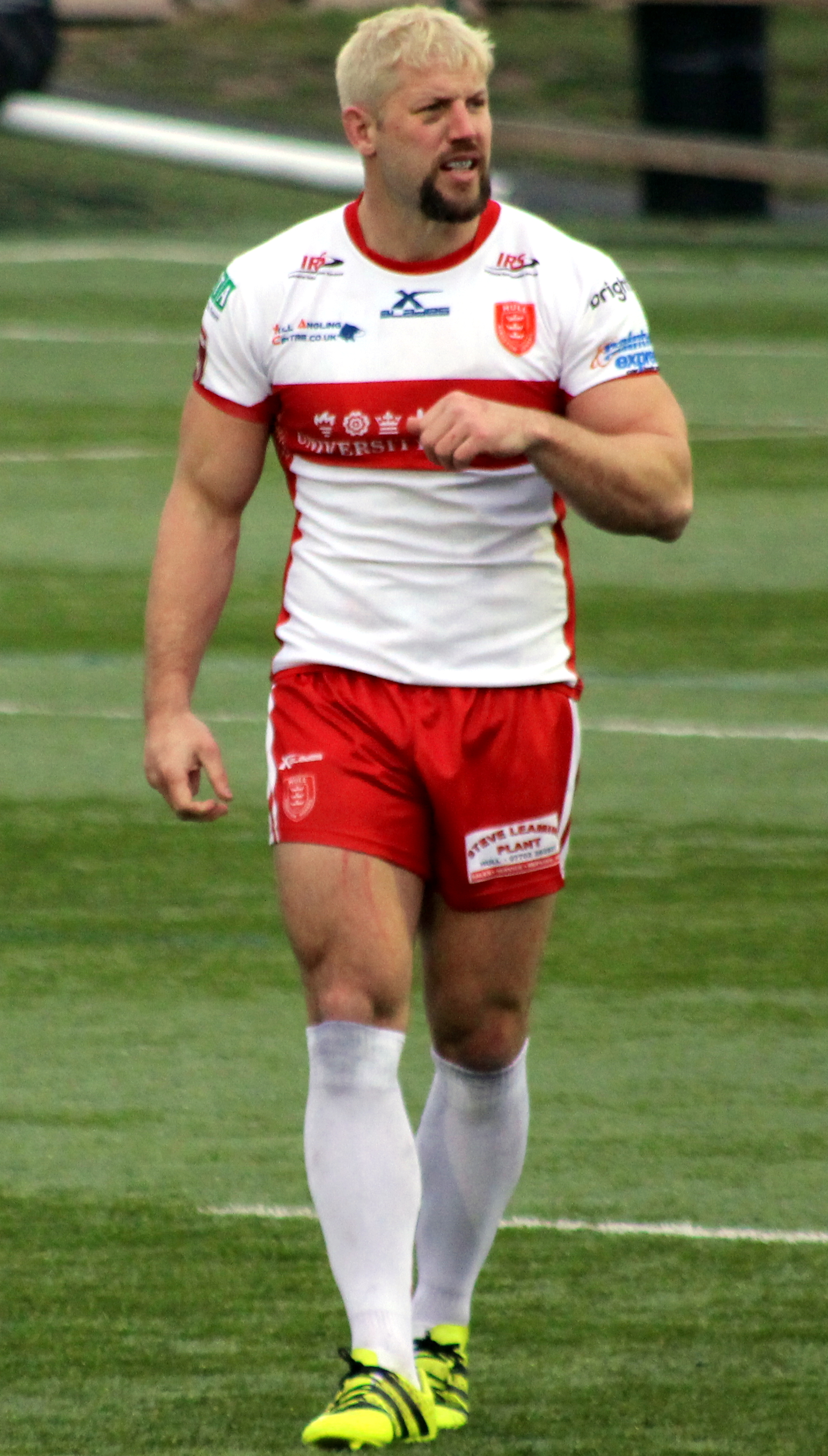

Personal information
- Full name: Nicholas Scruton
- Born: 24 December 1984 (age 41) Morley, West Yorkshire, England

Playing information
- Height: 6 ft 1 in (185 cm)
- Weight: 16 st 3 lb (103 kg)
- Position: Prop
Club
Years	Team	Pld	T	G	FG	P
2002–08	Leeds Rhinos	77	5	0	0	20
2004(loan)	→ Hull FC	18	3	0	0	12
2009–14	Bradford Bulls	102	7	0	0	28
2014–16	Wakefield Trinity Wildcats	77	11	0	0	44
2017–19	Hull Kingston Rovers	49	6	0	0	24
	Total	323	32	0	0	128
Representative
Years	Team	Pld	T	G	FG	P
2004–06	England	7	1	0	0	4

Nicholas Scruton (born 24 December 1984) is an English former professional rugby league footballer who most recently played as a prop for Hull Kingston Rovers in the Super League. He has previously played for the Wakefield Trinity Wildcats, Bradford Bulls, Hull F.C. and the Leeds Rhinos in the Super League. Scruton has also previously represented England.

== Background ==
Scruton was born in Morley, West Yorkshire, England.

== Playing career ==
=== Hull F.C. (2004) ===
In 2004 Scruton was loaned to Hull FC

He made 18 appearances and scored three tries in total.

=== Leeds Rhinos (2002-08) ===
Scruton was part of the Leeds Rhinos' 2007 Super League Grand Final victory, over St. Helens at Old Trafford.

Scruton was also part of the team that won the 2008 World Club Challenge, against the Melbourne Storm at Elland Road. He also played in the 2008 Super League Grand Final victory over St. Helens.

=== Bradford Bulls (2009-14) ===
Scruton signed a three-year deal to play for Bradford commencing in 2009.

In 2011, Scruton signed another three-year deal to extend his stay at the Bradford club.

In 2013, he collected many awards after the season with the Bradford side came to an end, where he won the 'Prized Bull Award,' from Head Coach, Francis Cummins.

=== Wakefield Trinity Wildcats (2014-16) ===
After Bradford went into liquidation for the second time in two-years in 2014, Scruton was then sold to Wakefield Trinity on a one-year deal.

=== Hull Kingston Rovers (2017-19) ===
Scruton joined Hull Kingston Rovers ahead of the 2017 Championship season on a two-year contract. Scruton was one of Hull Kingston Rovers standout players during the 2017 rugby league season, becoming a real 'fans' favourite' in his début year for Hull Kingston Rovers. Scruton was part of the Hull Kingston Rovers side that won promotion back to the Super League, at the first time of asking following relegation the season prior.

It was revealed on 10 October 2018, that Scruton would be staying at Hull Kingston Rovers after signing a new one-year contract.

After injuring himself in pre-season ahead of the start of the 2019 campaign, and not going onto make a single appearance in that season, it was revealed on 20 May 2019, that Scruton had been subsequently released from his contract at Hull Kingston Rovers.

=== England (2004-06) ===
Scruton has previously played for England on several occasions, he also recorded only a single try.

== Honours ==
=== Club ===
Leeds Rhinos

- Super League (2): 2007, 2008
- World Club Challenge (1): 2008

Bradford Bulls

- 2013: Bradford Bulls' 'Prized Bull Award'
