= 2012 World Club Challenge =

Intercontinental rugby league match

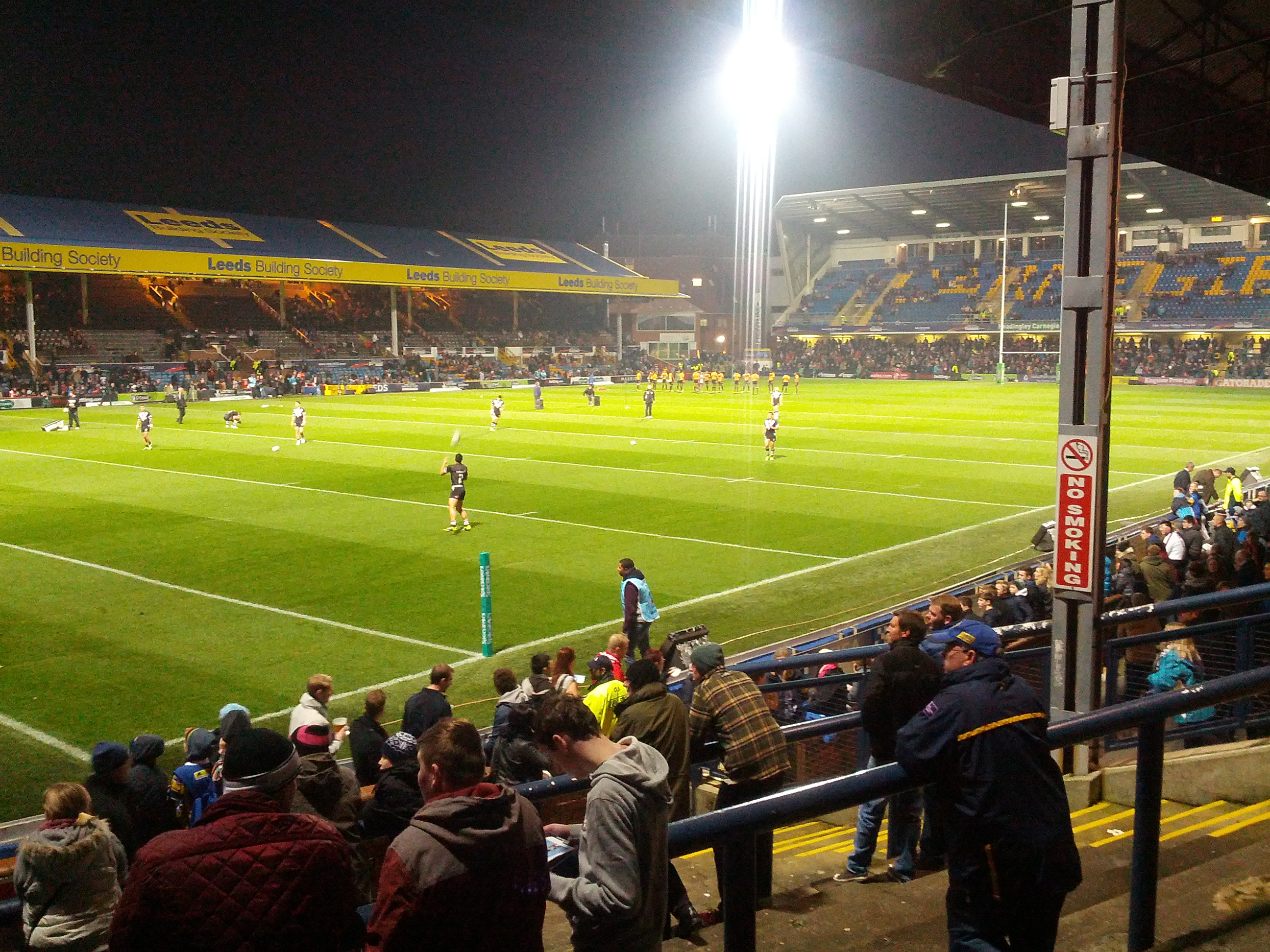
- Headingley hosted the match
Leeds Rhinos	Manly-Warringah Sea Eagles
(Super League)	(National Rugby League)
26	12
	1	2	Total
LEE	16	10	26
MAN	6	6	12
- Date: 17 February 2012
- Stadium: Headingley Carnegie Stadium
- Location: Leeds, West Yorkshire, England
- Man of the Match: Ryan Hall
- Referee: Ashley Klein (Australia)
- Attendance: 21,062

Broadcast partners
- Broadcasters: (United Kingdom) Sky Sports (Live); (Australia) Fox Sports (Delay); (Australia) Nine Network: *Channel 9 (Delay) *GEM (Live); (New Zealand) Māori Television (Live)
- Commentators: Eddie Hemmings; Mike Stephenson; Phil Clarke

The 2012 World Club Challenge (also known due to sponsorship as the Heinz Big Soup World Club Challenge) was the thirteenth consecutive World Club Challenge and was contested by Super League XVI champions, Leeds Rhinos and 2011 NRL Premiers, the Manly-Warringah Sea Eagles.

== Background ==
=== Leeds Rhinos ===
Leeds had finished the 2011 Super League season in 5th place before making their way to the Grand Final with wins over Hull F.C. (42–10), Huddersfield (34–28) and Warrington (26–24). In the Super League Grand Final, Leeds defeated St. Helens 32–16.

=== Manly-Warringah Sea Eagles ===
The Manly-Warringah Sea Eagles finished the 2011 NRL season in 2nd place and went on to defeat the 6th placed New Zealand Warriors 24–10 in the Grand Final. To get to their 3rd Grand Final appearance since 2007, Manly defeated North Queensland 42–8, and the Brisbane Broncos 24–14.

Following the off-season, they lost one trial match against the Cronulla-Sutherland Sharks 6–36 before flying to England for the World Club Challenge. Unlike 2009, Manly would not play a warm up game while in England.

== Teams ==
Leeds Rhinos	Manly-Warringah

FB	1	Brent Webb
RW	2	Ben Jones-Bishop
RC	6	Kallum Watkins
LC	4	Zak Hardaker
LW	5	Ryan Hall
SO	13	Kevin Sinfield (c)
SH	6	Danny McGuire
PR	8	Kylie Leuluai
HK	7	Rob Burrow
PR	10	Jamie Peacock
SR	11	Jamie Jones-Buchanan
SR	15	Brett Delaney
LF	12	Carl Ablett
Substitutions:
IC	9	Paul McShane
IC	20	Darrell Griffin
IC	16	Ryan Bailey
IC	18	Chris Clarkson
Coach:
(England) Brian McDermott

FB	1	Brett Stewart
RW	2	David Williams
RC	3	Jamie Lyon (c)
LC	4	Steve Matai
LW	5	Michael Oldfield
FE	6	Kieran Foran
HB	7	Daly Cherry-Evans
PR	8	Jason King
HK	9	Matt Ballin
PR	10	Brent Kite
SR	11	Anthony Watmough
SR	12	Tony Williams
LK	13	Glenn Stewart
Substitutions:
IC	14	Jamie Buhrer
IC	15	Vic Mauro
IC	16	Darcy Lussick
IC	17	George Rose
Coach:
(Australia) Geoff Toovey

== Match details ==
Sunday 17 February
20:00 UTC+0

Leeds Rhinos	26 – 12	Manly-Warringah Sea Eagles
Tries: Ryan Hall (2); Kallum Watkins; Ben Jones-Bishop; Carl Ablett; Goals: Kevin Sinfield (3/5)		Tries: Brett Stewart; Daly Cherry-Evans Goals: Jamie Lyon (2/2)

Headingley Carnegie Stadium, Leeds
Attendance: 21,062
Referee: Ashley Klein (Australia)
Player of the Match: Ryan Hall

The game was highlighted by Ryan Hall's 90-metre intercept try off a Brett Stewart pass midway through the first half to give Leeds a 10–0 lead. Leeds' win in front of a full house at Headingley saw them get revenge for their 28–20 loss to Manly in the 2009 World Club Challenge at Elland Road.
