= 2008 World Club Challenge =

Intercontinental rugby league match

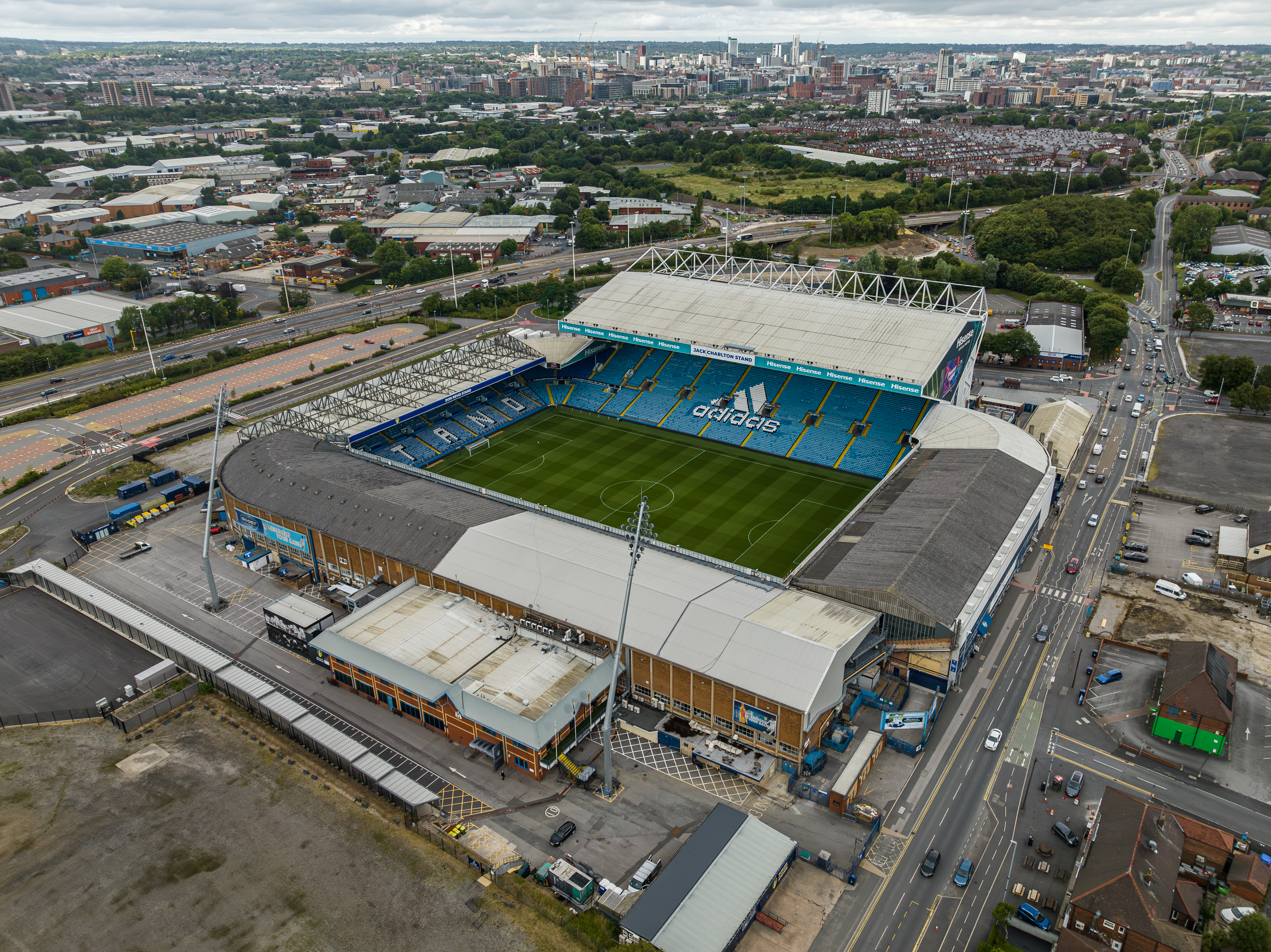
- Elland Road hosted the match
Leeds Rhinos	Melbourne Storm
(Super League)	(National Rugby League)
11	4
	1	2	Total
LEE	8	3	11
MEL	4	0	4
- Date: 29 February 2008
- Stadium: Elland Road
- Location: Leeds, United Kingdom
- Man of the Match: Kevin Sinfield
- Referee: Ashley Klein
- Attendance: 33,204

Broadcast partners
- Broadcasters: (United Kingdom) Sky Sports; (Australia) Nine Network
- Commentators: Eddie Hemmings; Mike Stephenson

The 2008 Carnegie World Club Challenge was contested between Super League XII champions, the Leeds Rhinos and National Rugby League season 2007 premiers, the Melbourne Storm. For the fifth consecutive year the English home team defeated their Australian counterparts.

== Qualification ==
=== Leeds Rhinos ===
Leeds Rhinos qualified through being the 2007 Super League champions, defeating St. Helens 33–6 in the Grand Final.

=== Melbourne Storm ===
Melbourne Storm clinched the 2007 National Rugby League title in a 34–8 belting of Manly, earning them a place in the World Club Challenge.

Melbourne played a warm-up game against National League One team Halifax.

== Teams ==
Melbourne's squad included 11 members of the 2007 premiership team, but were missing captain Cameron Smith who had stayed in Australia to be present for the birth of his first child.

Team details
Leeds Rhinos		Position	Melbourne Storm
Name	Number	Position	Number	Name
Brent Webb	1	FB	1	Billy Slater
Lee Smith	5	WG	2	Steve Turner
Clinton Toopi	3	CE	3	Will Chambers
Keith Senior	4	CE	4	Israel Folau
Scott Donald	2	WG	5	Anthony Quinn
Danny McGuire	6	SO/FE	9	Matt Geyer
Rob Burrow	7	SH/HB	7	Cooper Cronk (c)
Kylie Leuluai	8	PR	8	Jeff Lima
Matt Diskin	9	HK	11	Jeremy Smith
Jamie Peacock	10	PF	10	Brett White
Jamie Jones-Buchanan	11	SR	14	Antonio Kaufusi
Gareth Ellis	12	SR	12	Ryan Hoffman
Kevin Sinfield (c)	13	LF/LK	13	Dallas Johnson
Ali Lauitiiti	14	IN	6	Russell Aitken
Ryan Bailey	16	IN	15	Adam Blair
Nick Scruton	17	IN	16	Sika Manu
Carl Ablett	19	IN	17	Sam Tagataese
(New Zealand) Brian McClennan		Coach		(Australia) Craig Bellamy

== Match details ==
2008 World Club Challenge

29 February 2008
20:00 GMT (UTC+0)

Leeds Rhinos	11 – 4	Melbourne Storm
Tries: 1 Donald 38'; Goals: 3 Sinfield pen 11', 39', pen 60' (3/3); Drop goals: 1 Sinfield 68'	1st: 8 – 4; 2nd: 3 – 0 Report	Tries: 1 Hoffman 16'; Goals: 0/1; Turner (0/1)

Elland Road, Leeds
Attendance: 33,204
Referee: Ashley Klein (Australia)
Player of the Match: Kevin Sinfield

=== Summary ===
The match was played in cold and windy conditions, four rounds into the 2008 Super League competition and one week before the start of the 2008 NRL season. 33,204 spectators turned out at Elland Road, in Leeds for a hard-fought, low-scoring match in which each side scored a try apiece, with Leeds ultimately coming out winners, due largely to the goal kicking of Kevin Sinfield. The win meant the English champions side defeated their Australian counterparts for the fifth consecutive year.

=== First half ===
Kevin Sinfield opened the scoring for Leeds, converting a penalty goal from directly in front of the posts, but Melbourne would score the first try with acting captain Cooper Cronk sending Ryan Hoffman over the line in the 16th minute to take a 4–2 lead.Steve Turner could not add the conversion in the blustery conditions.

Danny McGuire would leave the field in the half due to a shoulder injury, however in his absence, Leeds would take a half time lead when Brent Webb floated a pass to Scott Donald to score a try in the corner. Sinfield's conversion from the sideline giving Leeds a 8–4 lead.

=== Second half ===
Heavy rain greeted the players upon the resumption. Turner would not return for Melbourne after half time due to concussion. Clinton Toopi would then join McGuire on the sidelines through injury for Leeds, with Toopi suffering an arm injury. A biting allegation against Leeds winger Lee Smith was a minor controversy midway through the second half, but despite immediately reporting the incident to the touch judge, Melbourne's Will Chambers refused to file an official complaint at full time.

In a battle of attrition, defence won out as the half progressed, with Melbourne unable to find a way through the Leeds line. Chambers came close to a late try in the 78th minute, but his foot found the touch line before he could ground the ball. In the end Sinfield's penalty goal in the 60th minute and drop goal 12 minutes from full time, were the only points in the second half.

== See also ==
World Club Challenge
