= Danny McGuire =

English rugby league player & coach

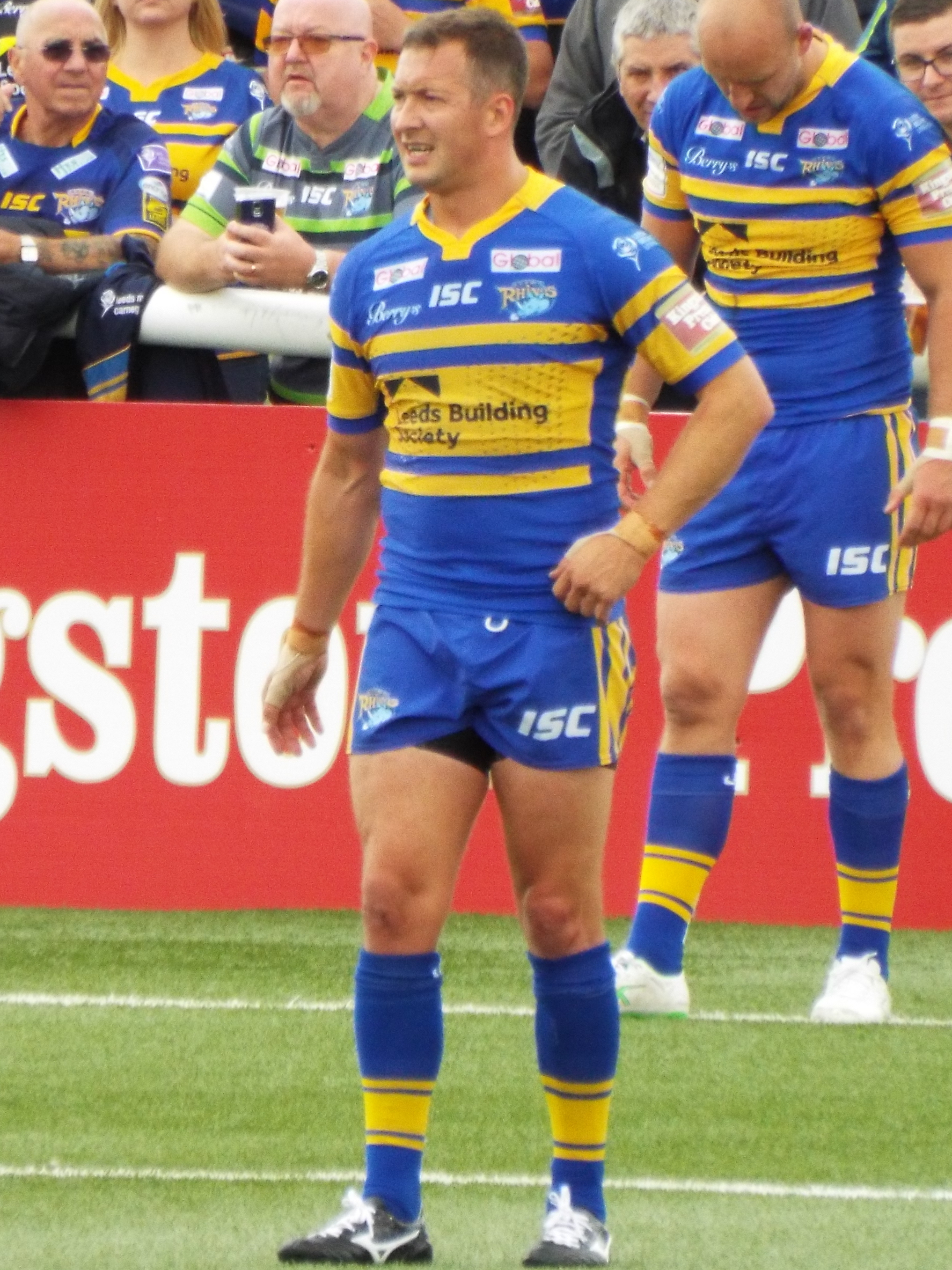

Personal information
- Full name: Daniel Phillip McGuire
- Born: 6 December 1982 (age 43) Leeds, West Yorkshire, England

Playing information
- Height: 5 ft 11 in (1.80 m)
- Weight: 13 st 12 lb (88 kg)
- Position: Scrum-half, Stand-off
Club
Years	Team	Pld	T	G	FG	P
2001–17	Leeds Rhinos	426	267	0	7	1075
2018–19	Hull Kingston Rovers	45	9	1	4	42
	Total	471	276	1	11	1117
Representative
Years	Team	Pld	T	G	FG	P
2004–07	Great Britain	12	5	1	0	22
2008–09	England	7	4	0	0	16

Coaching information
Club
Years	Team	Gms	W	D	L	W%
2022	Hull Kingston Rovers (interim)	9	4	0	5	44
2025	Castleford Tigers	18	4	0	14	22
	Total	27	8	0	19	30

Daniel Phillip McGuire (born 6 December 1982) is an English rugby league coach, and former professional rugby league footballer, who was most recently head coach of the Castleford Tigers, until his departure after just 9 months, on 7 July 2025.

He played as a scrum-half or stand-off and spent the majority of his professional career with the Leeds Rhinos, winning a total of eight Super League Championships, two Challenge Cups, three World Club Challenge Championships and the League Leaders' Shield three times. He made over 400 appearances for the club between 2001 and 2017, before spending two seasons at Hull Kingston Rovers at the end of his playing career.

McGuire also played for Great Britain and England at international level and represented England at the 2008 Rugby League World Cup.

McGuire was awarded the Harry Sunderland Trophy in two Grand Finals, one of only three men to do so, alongside his former team-mates Kevin Sinfield and Rob Burrow. McGuire was also the first player to score 200 tries in the Super League and he became the highest try-scorer in the competition's history in 2012, surpassing his former team-mate, Keith Senior.

Upon retirement, McGuire moved into the role of assistant coach at Hull Kingston Rovers. He worked under Tony Smith and later Willie Peters, as well as taking interim charge prior to Peters' arrival. Having joined the Castleford Tigers ahead of 2024, he worked as assistant coach to Craig Lingard for one season before becoming head coach from 2025.

== Playing career ==
=== Leeds Rhinos ===
==== 2001–2009 ====
Born in Leeds, West Yorkshire, McGuire signed for his hometown professional club, Leeds Rhinos, from local team East Leeds A.R.L.F.C.

McGuire impressed for the academy side and made his début for the Leeds Rhinos' first-grade team at Headingley Stadium, against the Salford City Reds on 6 July 2001.

By the start of the 2003's Super League VIII, McGuire had established himself as a first-team regular.

He ended 2004's Super League IX having scored 39 tries in all competitions, including a then Super League record of five in one match against the Widnes Vikings. He finished with one fewer than the Super League's top try scorer, Bradford Bulls' Lesley Vainikolo. McGuire's superb form resulted in him being awarded the RLWBA Player of the Year, to also add him being named in the 2004 Super League Dream Team.

The Leeds Rhinos won the 2004 League Leaders' Shield, with Danny playing a pivotal role in their accomplishment. McGuire played at halfback in the Leeds Rhinos' 2004 Super League Grand Final victory against the Bradford Bulls, with Danny scoring a try, a game which ended the Leeds Rhinos' 32-year wait for the Championship.

As Super League IX Champions, the Leeds Rhinos faced 2004 NRL season Premiers, the Canterbury-Bankstown Bulldogs in the 2005 World Club Challenge. McGuire played at stand-off and scored a try in the Leeds Rhinos' 39–32 victory. He played for the Leeds Rhinos in the 2005 Challenge Cup Final from the interchange bench, in their loss against Hull F.C. McGuire suffered a defeat in the 2005 Super League Grand Final, which was a rematch of the 2004 Final against the Bradford Bulls. McGuire played at stand-off and scored the Leeds Rhinos' only try, in a 15–6 defeat.

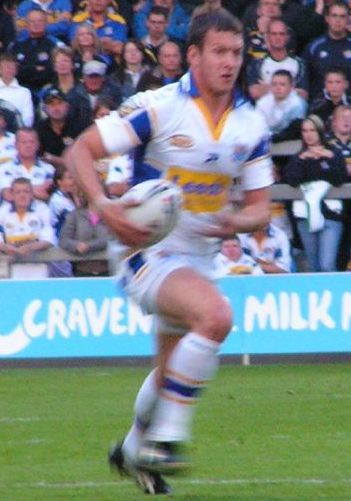
McGuire playing for the Leeds Rhinos in 2007

McGuire played in the 2007 Super League Grand Final this time defeating St Helens, by a score of 33–6. This also happened again in the 2008 Super League Grand Final again, defeating St. Helens, in a closer affair than the year before.

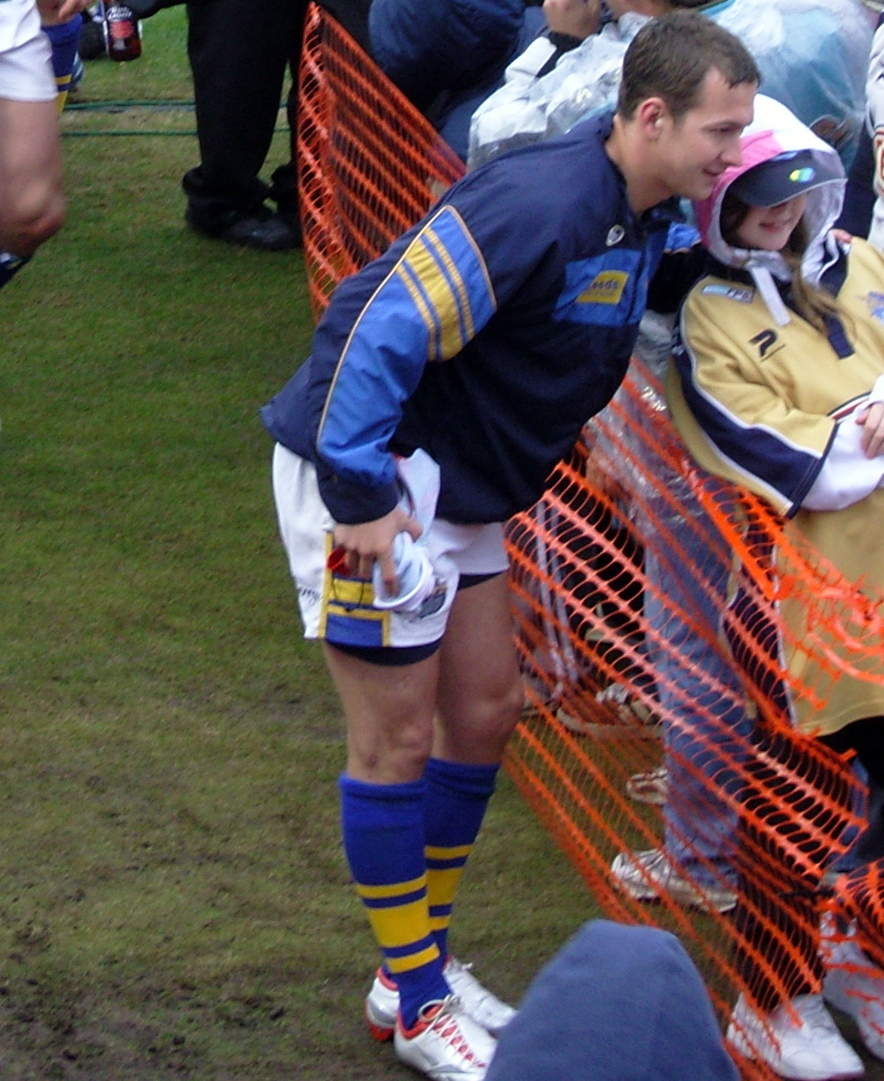
McGuire posing with a fan in Florida in 2008

The Leeds Rhinos' subsequently winning the match, 24–16., with McGuire scoring two tries in the second half to ensure victory. He was part of the Leeds Rhinos' 2008 World Club Challenge winning squad, defeating the 2007 NRL Season Premiers, the Melbourne Storm, recording a final score of 11–4.

McGuire won his second League Leaders' Shield in 2009 with the Leeds Rhinos.

McGuire's fourth grand final came in the 2009 Super League Grand Final, when the Leeds Rhinos defeated St. Helens for a third-year in a row, by a score of 18–10 at Old Trafford.

==== 2010–2017 ====
After winning three titles in a row the Leeds Rhinos struggled in 2010. McGuire excelled though, scoring 27 tries in 32 games, his equal best since his excellent 2004 season.

He played in the 2010 Challenge Cup Final defeat by the Warrington Wolves at Wembley Stadium.

McGuire's season ended in controversy though, during the Leeds Rhinos' win in their first play-off match against the eventual champions the Wigan Warriors.

With just moments remaining in the match, the Leeds Rhinos led 27–26, when the Wigan Warriors broke down the left of the field, McGuire was adjudged to have pulled back the Wigan Warriors' George Carmont, preventing him from scoring a potential match-winning try.

But in doing so, McGuire suffered a serious knee injury which ruled him out for up to six-months. Meaning he'd miss the remainder of the season and the start of the next.

Former Wigan Warriors star Phil Clarke, caused further controversy by writing, "Perhaps the rugby Gods have punished him (McGuire), for his unsportsmanlike play." The comments were posted on his blog on the Sky Sports website.

McGuire played at stand-off for the Leeds Rhinos in the 2011 Challenge Cup Final defeat by the Wigan Warriors at Wembley Stadium.

His fifth and latest Grand Final win again, against St Helens, came in 2011, with the Leeds Rhinos coming from 5th in the regular season table to win 32–16, in the 2011 Super League Grand Final at Old Trafford.

McGuire was part of the Leeds Rhinos side that won the 2012 World Club Challenge 26–12, against the Manly-Warringah Sea Eagles.

McGuire also tasted victory in the 2012 Super League Grand Final against the Warrington Wolves at Old Trafford.

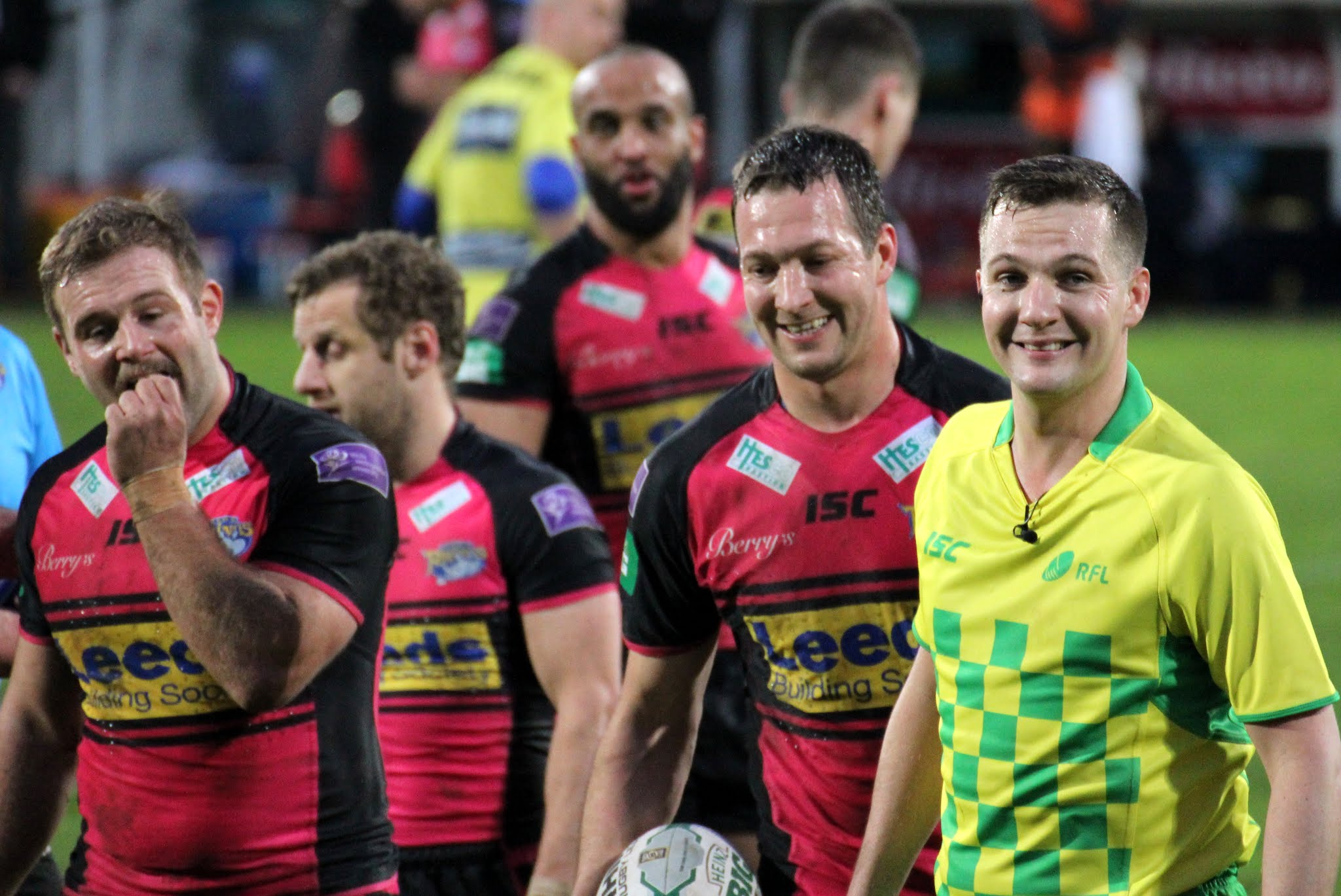
McGuire playing for the Leeds Rhinos in 2013

He played in the 2014 Challenge Cup Final victory over the Castleford Tigers at Wembley Stadium.

The Leeds Rhinos won the 2015 Challenge Cup Final with victory over Hull Kingston Rovers at Wembley Stadium and the 2015 League Leaders' Shield.

The Leeds Rhinos also claimed the spoils in the 2015 Super League Grand Final, in a thrilling encounter against the Wigan Warriors, eventually winning the game 20–22, in which McGuire scored two tries, being awarded the Harry Sunderland Trophy as player of the match, and wrapping up the domestic treble for his club at Old Trafford.

McGuire's final game for the Leeds Rhinos came in the 2017 Super League Grand Final where the Leeds Rhinos defeated the Castleford Tigers 6–24 at Old Trafford, with McGuire scoring two tries and kicking a drop-goal, on his farewell appearance for the Leeds Rhinos.

=== Hull Kingston Rovers ===
McGuire signed a two-year deal to play for Hull Kingston Rovers in the 2018 and 2019 Super League seasons.

Danny made his début for Hull Kingston Rovers on 2 February 2018, in a 6–28 defeat by Wakefield Trinity.

He scored his first try for Hull Kingston Rovers against the Huddersfield Giants, in round 5 of the 2018's Super League XXIII.

Danny recorded his first hat-trick of tries for Hull Kingston Rovers in a 52-22 Super League victory over the Salford Red Devils, on 8 July 2018 at Craven Park.

In pre-season ahead of the start of the 2019's Super League XXIV, Danny announced that the 2019 campaign would be his last as a player as he revealed his intentions to retire at the end of that same year.

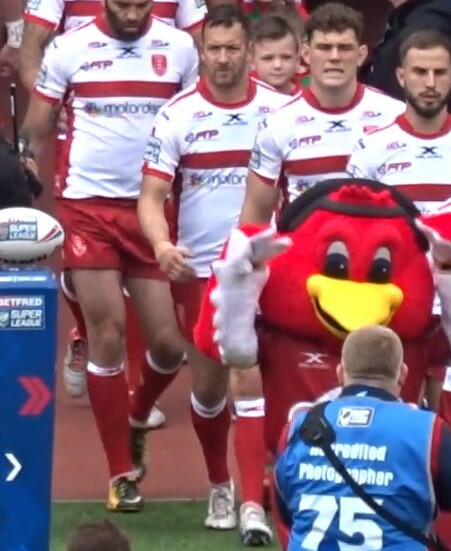
McGuire walking out for Hull KR in 2019

== International career ==
=== Great Britain ===
On the back of his superb season in 2004, McGuire was named in the Great Britain squad for the Tri-Nations tournament. He made his début off the bench in Great Britain's first game defeat by Australia.

He then made his first start for Great Britain in their next match against New Zealand, playing a key role and creating the try which ensured a 22–12 victory.

=== England ===
In 2008, McGuire was named along with seven Leeds Rhinos' teammates, in England's and former Leeds Rhinos Head Coach Tony Smith's 24-man squad for the 2008 Rugby League World Cup.

He played from the interchange bench as England came from behind to scrape past Papua New Guinea. The final score was 32–22, in the opening game of the tournament.

England then lost 52–4, to host nation and tournament favourites, Australia.

McGuire was left out of the squad for England's final group game, where they surrendered a 24-12 half-time lead to lose 36–24 to New Zealand.

McGuire started his first game of the tournament against New Zealand in the semi-final. It also proved to be his last as despite scoring two tries, McGuire could not prevent England losing 32-22 and being eliminated.

== Coaching career ==
=== Hull Kingston Rovers ===
On 20 May 2019, it was revealed that, following McGuire's retirement as a player, he would take on the role of Head of Recruitment at Hull Kingston Rovers from 2020's Super League XXV. In November 2020, Hull KR announced that he would join the coaching staff as an assistant to Tony Smith from the 2021 season.

In July 2022, McGuire became interim head coach following the departure of Smith. During this period, he led Hull KR to five wins from ten games.

Following the arrival of Willie Peters as head coach for 2023, McGuire resumed his previous position of assistant head coach, having recently signed a contract extension until the end of 2025.

In October 2023, McGuire departed Hull KR to "enable Willie Peters to create his own coaching team".

=== Castleford Tigers ===
On 17 October 2023, the Castleford Tigers announced the appointment of McGuire as assistant coach on a two-year deal, working under new head coach Craig Lingard. The team finished the 2024 season in 10th place. In October 2024, new chairman Martin Jepson completed a takeover of the club and Lingard was dismissed after one season at the helm. With McGuire remaining in post, he quickly emerged as the leading candidate to step into the role.

On 25 October 2024, Castleford confirmed that McGuire would be appointed as their new head coach on a three-year contract, marking his first permanent head coaching role.

On 7 July 2025 it was reported that he had left Castleford after their latest home defeat to fellow strugglers Huddersfield, with Director of Rugby Chris Chester taking over as interim head-coach

== Honours ==
=== Leeds Rhinos ===
- Super League (8): 2004, 2007, 2008, 2009, 2011, 2012, 2015, 2017
- League Leaders' Shield (3): 2004, 2009, 2015
- Challenge Cup (2): 2014, 2015
- World Club Challenge (3): 2005, 2008, 2012
