= 2008 Super League season =

British rugby league season

Super League XIII
- League: Super League
- Duration: 27 rounds
- Teams: 12
- Highest attendance: 21,283; Hull F.C. vs Hull Kingston Rovers (20 July)
- Lowest attendance: 2,112; Harlequins vs Castleford Tigers (20 July)
- Total attendance: 1,674,809 ▲ (average 10,338)
- Broadcast partners: Sky Sports

2008 Season
- Champions: Leeds Rhinos; 3rd Super League title 6th British title
- League Leaders: St. Helens
- Man of Steel: (England) James Graham
- Top point-scorer: (Republic of Ireland) Pat Richards (269)
- Top try-scorer: (England) Ade Gardner (26)

Licences
- Licence awarded to: Celtic Crusaders; Salford City Reds

Engage Super League XIII was the official name, due to sponsorship, for the 2008 Super League season by Engage Mutual. Twelve teams competed for the League Leader's Shield over 27 rounds (including Millennium Magic), after which the top 6 finishing teams entered the play-offs where they competed for a place in the Grand Final and the chance to win the Super League Trophy.

The Castleford Tigers took the place of the Salford City Reds who finished last in the Super League in 2007 and were therefore relegated.

The season kicked off on Saturday 2 February, with Leeds Rhinos playing Hull Kingston Rovers at Headingley Carnegie. This was the only game played on this weekend, due to Leeds' 2008 World Club Challenge fixture with Melbourne Storm on Friday 29 February. Leeds won the close-fought game 20-12.

The interest in events on the pitch was matched by those off it with the lead up to and the announcement of which teams were to be awarded Super League licences for 2009–11.

== Teams ==
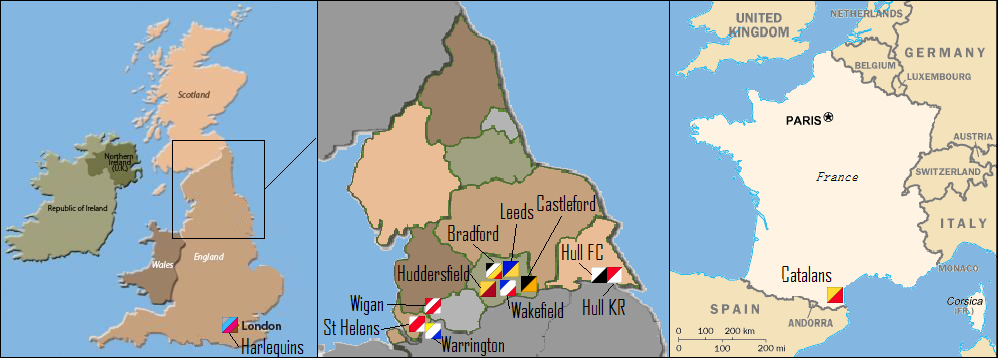
The locations of the teams that contested Super League XIII.

Team	Stadium	Capacity	City/Area
Bradford Bulls (2008 season)	Grattan Stadium, Odsal	27,000	Bradford, West Yorkshire
Castleford Tigers (2008 season)	The Jungle	11,750	Castleford, West Yorkshire
Catalans Dragons (2008 season)	Stade Gilbert Brutus	12,000	Perpignan, Pyrénées-Orientales, France
Harlequins (2008 season)	Twickenham Stoop	12,700	Twickenham, London
Huddersfield Giants (2008 season)	Galpharm Stadium	24,544	Huddersfield, West Yorkshire
Hull F.C. (2008 season)	Kingston Communications Stadium	25,404	Kingston upon Hull, East Riding of Yorkshire
Hull Kingston Rovers (2008 season)	"New" Craven Park	9,471	Kingston upon Hull, East Riding of Yorkshire
Leeds Rhinos (2008 season) (Reigning Champions)	Headingley Carnegie Stadium	22,250	Leeds, West Yorkshire
St Helens R.F.C. (2008 season)	Knowsley Road	17,500	St Helens, Merseyside
Wakefield Trinity Wildcats (2008 season)	Belle Vue	12,600	Wakefield, West Yorkshire
Warrington Wolves (2008 season)	Halliwell Jones Stadium	14,206	Warrington, Cheshire
Wigan Warriors (2008 season)	JJB Stadium	25,138	Wigan, Greater Manchester

== Rule changes ==
- If a team kicks the ball from a 20-metre restart and the ball bounces into touch or over the dead ball line they will be given head and feed at the resulting scrum.
- In the scrum the ball can no longer be trapped by the loose forward in an attempt to catch the opposition offside. If the scrum moves forwards and the ball comes from between and behind the inner feet of the second row forwards it will be deemed to be out of the scrum.
- Defenders, excluding the markers at a play-the-ball, must stand with both feet behind the referee's front foot to be judged onside.
- If over their try-line the defenders steal the ball from the attacking team when there is more than one defender involved in the tackle a penalty will be given rather than a penalty try.

== Operational rules ==
Refined salary cap regulation to prevent clubs over-spending:

- Super League clubs agreed to use the pro-active salary cap already in use in Australasia with the NRL. The new cap examines each club's salary cap position at the beginning of and then during the season, new player signings will be permitted only if it is affordable within the cap. Nigel Wood, the RFL's chief operating officer, explained that new system dealt with the weaknesses of the previous one that had meant breaches were only discovered in retrospect and could only be acted upon during the following season, as the new system is 'live' clubs cannot breach through miscalculation or mismanagement.
- The salary cap for this season was set at £1.6 million for the combined earnings of the top 25 players. Clubs are permitted to spend a £50,000 maximum on players outside the top 25 earners who have made at least one appearance for the club in the first grade during the year. Expenditure on players outside the top 25 who make no appearance for the first team are unregulated. If a player has represented the same club for 10 consecutive seasons only half of their salary will be counted towards the cap for the eleventh and subsequent seasons - subject to a £50,000 maximum for each club.

To provide a bigger pool of talent for the Great Britain team:

- Clubs ratified a homegrown player rule designating 'club trained players'. Clubs must include a minimum of five players who have come through their academy or are under 21 years old in their 25-player first team squads. British clubs were required to have ten United Kingdom-trained players and no more than ten overseas-trained players in their 25-player squads.

== Season summary ==
- 2 February - 16 weeks to the day after their Grand Final win, Super League XII champions Leeds Rhinos open the new season with a 20-12 win at home to Hull Kingston Rovers.
- 10 February - The first upsets of the new season, with Hull Kingston Rovers beating St. Helens 24-22, and Wakefield Trinity Wildcats beating Bradford Bulls 26-24.
- 24 February - Huddersfield Giants became the first team in the league to score in excess of fifty points, by beating Castleford Tigers 64-12, running in twelve tries.
- 7 March - The winless (0-4) Castleford Tigers comfortably beat the unbeaten (4-0) Leeds Rhinos by 38-20. In doing so, the only two 100% records in the league (Leeds 100% victories, Castleford 100% defeats) are broken.
- 8 March - Richie Mathers becomes the first player to be sent off during Super League XIII following a 49th minute high tackle on Matt King, playing in Wigan Warriors' 32-20 away defeat by Warrington Wolves.
- 8 March - Harlequins become the first team to 'nil' their opponents in Super League XIII, beating Huddersfield Giants 24-0 at home.
- 3/4 May - The second Millennium Magic weekend takes place over the May bank holiday weekend; Warrington, Wakefield Trinity and Leeds are victorious on the Saturday with Catalans Dragons, Hull Kingston Rovers and St. Helens emerging victorious on the Sunday.
- 20 May - Peter Sharp becomes the first coach to be sacked in the season after Hull F.C. moved to 11th place in the table following their defeat to Harlequins.
- 26 May - Paul Cullen becomes the second coach to depart in a week, resigning after 6 years in charge following his team's 36-28 loss to Castleford.
- 2 June - Jon Sharp makes it three casualties on the coaching front in the space of less than a fortnight as he is sacked after a poor run of form culminating in a 48-0 defeat in the south of France.
- 5 July - Saints claw back a 6-point table deficit and unseat Leeds as Super League leaders. For the first time this season there is a different team occupying top spot.

== Table ==
Super League XIII
Pos	Team	Pld	W	D	L	PF	PA	PD	Pts	Qualification
1	St. Helens (L)	27	21	1	5	940	457	+483	43	Semi-final
2	Leeds Rhinos (C)	27	21	0	6	863	413	+450	42	Semi-final
3	Catalans Dragons	27	16	2	9	694	625	+69	34	Elimination semi-finals
4	Wigan Warriors	27	13	3	11	648	698	−50	29	Elimination semi-finals
5	Bradford Bulls	27	14	0	13	705	625	+80	28	Elimination semi-finals
6	Warrington Wolves	27	14	0	13	690	713	−23	28	Elimination semi-finals
7	Hull Kingston Rovers	27	11	1	15	564	713	−149	23	
8	Wakefield Trinity Wildcats	27	11	0	16	574	760	−186	22	
9	Harlequins	27	11	0	16	569	763	−194	22	
10	Huddersfield Giants	27	10	1	16	638	681	−43	21	
11	Hull F.C.	27	8	1	18	538	699	−161	17	
12	Castleford Tigers	27	7	1	19	593	869	−276	15	

Source: superleague.co.uk
Rules for classification: 1st on competition points; 2nd on match points difference.
Competition points: for win = 2; for draw = 1; for loss = 0.
(C) Champions; (L) League Leaders' Shield Winners

== Media ==
=== Television ===
In 2008, Super League games were broadcast exclusively live by Sky Sports in the United Kingdom.

== Sponsorship ==
Engage Mutual, a financial services provider, agreed a deal with the Rugby Football League to extend their title sponsorship of the Super League competition for up for three years. The agreement continues title sponsorship until the end of the 2010 season and gives Engage Mutual an option for the 2011 season.

== Statistics ==
=== Attendance ===
The average attendance for the regular season in 2008 was 10,338 (a Super League record) this was up from 9,855 in 2007 which was previously the record. The regular season attendance aggregate was also the highest ever for Super League at 1,674,809 up from 1,537,326 for 2007. For the seventh consecutive season since 2001 the regular season average attendance and aggregate attendance had increased from the previous year.

=== Tries ===
No.	Player	Club	P	T
1	Ade Gardner	St Helens R.F.C.	26	28
2	Scott Donald	Leeds Rhinos	24	21
3	Luke Dorn	Castleford Tigers	26	19
=3	Pat Richards	Wigan Warriors	25	19
5	Semi Tadulala	Bradford Bulls	23	17
=5	Clint Greenshields	Catalans Dragons	27	17
=5	Danny McGuire	Leeds Rhinos	21	17
8	Kirk Yeaman	Hull	23	16
=8	Chris Hicks	Warrington Wolves	27	16
10	Paul Sykes	Bradford Bulls	25	15
=10	Justin Murphy	Catalans Dragons	14	15
=10	Brent Webb	Leeds Rhinos	25	15

=== Points ===
No.	Player	Club	P	T	G	FG	Pts
1	Pat Richards	Wigan Warriors	25	19	115	1	307
2	Thomas Bosc	Catalans Dragons	26	7	118	1	265
3	Kevin Sinfield	Leeds Rhinos	26	4	119	1	255
4	Sean Long	St Helens R.F.C.	23	8	104	2	242
5	Chris Hicks	Warrington Wolves	27	16	70	0	204
6	Danny Brough	Wakefield Trinity Wildcats	25	4	86	0	188
7	Chris Thorman	Huddersfield Giants	21	5	83	1	187
8	Danny Tickle	Hull	25	5	81	0	182
9	Paul Deacon	Bradford Bulls	18	3	82	1	177
10	Ade Gardner	St Helens R.F.C.	26	28	0	0	112

=== Red cards ===
No.	Player	Club	#	Date(s)
1	Richie Mathers	Wigan Warriors	2	03/08/2008; 15/08/2008
2	Michael McIlorum	Wigan Warriors	1	18/07/2008
=2	Tevita Latu	Wakefield Trinity Wildcats	1	14/03/2008
=2	Darrell Griffin	Huddersfield Giants	1	16/03/2008
=2	Maurie Fa'asavalu	St Helens R.F.C.	1	06/04/2008
=2	Louie McCarthy-Scarsbrook	Harlequins	1	12/07/2008
=2	Ben Westwood	Warrington Wolves	1	06/04/2008
=2	Luke Robinson	Huddersfield Giants	1	15/06/2008
=2	Adam Mogg	Catalans Dragons	1	12/07/2008
=2	Ned Catic	Castleford Tigers	1	06/09/2008
=2	Paul Sykes	Bradford Bulls	1	06/07/2008
=2	Nick Scruton	Leeds Rhinos	1	20/06/2008
=2	Gareth Hock	Wigan Warriors	1	25/07/2008
