= 2015 Leeds Rhinos season =

- Super League Rank: 1st - Winners
- Play-off result: Winners
- Challenge Cup: Winners
- 2015 record: Wins: 26; draws: 1; losses: 9
- Points scored: For: 1132; against: 719

Team information
- Chairman: (England) Paul Caddick
- Head Coach: (England) Brian McDermott
- Captain: (England) Kevin Sinfield
- Stadium: Headingley Stadium
- High attendance: 18,514 (v St Helens)

Top scorers
- Tries: (England) Ryan Hall (22)
- Goals: (England) Kevin Sinfield (137)
- Points: (England) Kevin Sinfield (289)
← 2014	List of seasons	2016 →

This article details the Leeds Rhinos rugby league football club's 2015 season. This was the Rhinos 20th season in the Super League. Leeds Rhinos were reigning Challenge Cup winners and became only the third team in the Super League era to win the treble, winning the Challenge Cup, Super League Leaders' Shield and the 2015 Super League Grand Final.

== Players ==
=== Squad ===
- Appearances and points include (Super League, Challenge Cup and Play-offs) as of 10 October 2015.

No	Player	Position	Previous club	Apps	Tries	Goals	DG	Points
1	(England) Zak Hardaker	Fullback	Featherstone Rovers	31	13	9	1	71
2	(England) Tom Briscoe	Winger	Hull F.C.	17	15	0	0	60
3	(England) Kallum Watkins	Centre	Academy	32	20	0	0	80
4	(Australia) Joel Moon	Centre	Salford Red Devils	32	15	0	0	60
5	(England) Ryan Hall	Wing	Academy	31	22	0	0	88
6	(England) Danny McGuire	Stand Off	Academy	34	17	0	0	68
7	(England) Rob Burrow	Scrum-half	Academy	30	12	0	0	48
8	(New Zealand) Kylie Leuluai	Prop	Manly Sea Eagles	22	2	0	0	8
9	(Papua New Guinea) Paul Aiton	Hooker	Wakefield Trinity	27	3	0	0	12
10	(England) Jamie Peacock	Prop	Bradford Bulls	34	3	0	0	12
11	(England) Jamie Jones-Buchanan	Second Row	Academy	11	0	0	0	0
12	(England) Carl Ablett	Second Row	Academy	36	12	0	0	48
13	(England) Kevin Sinfield	Loose forward	Academy	30	3	137	3	289
14	(England) Stevie Ward	Loose forward	Academy	28	5	0	0	20
15	(Australia) Brett Delaney	Second Row	Gold Coast Titans	26	4	0	0	16
16	(Australia) Mitch Achurch	Prop	Penrith Panthers	20	3	0	0	12
17	(Australia) Adam Cuthbertson	Prop	Newcastle Knights	34	9	0	0	36
18	(England) Liam Sutcliffe	Stand-off	Academy	15	6	25	0	74
19	(Republic of Ireland) Brad Singleton	Prop	Academy	34	9	0	0	36
20	(Germany) Jimmy Keinhorst	Centre	Academy	17	6	0	0	24
21	(England) Josh Walters	Second Row	Academy	12	2	0	0	8
22	(England) Andy Yates	Prop	Academy	10	1	0	0	4
23	(England) Elliott Minchella	Loose forward	Academy	0	0	0	0	0
24	(England) Robbie Ward	Hooker	Academy	3	0	0	0	0
26	(Jamaica) Ashton Golding	Fullback	Academy	4	0	0	0	0
27	(England) Ash Handley	Wing	Academy	20	13	0	0	52
28	(England) Rob Mulhern	Prop	Academy	2	0	0	0	0
29	(England) Jordan Lilley	Prop	Academy	6	0	1	0	2
30	(Australia) Mitch Garbutt	Prop	Brisbane Broncos	14	1	0	0	4

=== Transfers ===
In

Nat	Name	Signed from	Contract	Date
(Australia)	Beau Falloon	Gold Coast Titans	1 Year	November 2015
(Australia)	Adam Cuthbertson	Newcastle Knights	4 Years	May 2014
(England)	Jordan Baldwinson	New Zealand Warriors	3 Years	June 2014
(England)	Mason Tonks	New Zealand Warriors	3 Years	June 2014
(England)	James Duckworth	London Broncos	Loan Return	August 2014
(Germany)	Jimmy Keinhorst	Wakefield Trinity Wildcats	Loan Return	September 2014

Out

Nat	Name	Sold To	Contract	Date
(England)	Ben Jones-Bishop	Salford Red Devils	3 Years	June 2014
(England)	Brad England	Salford Red Devils	1 Year	September 2014
(England)	Chris Clarkson	Widnes Vikings	1 Year Loan	September 2014
(England)	Ryan Bailey	Hull Kingston Rovers	2 Years	October 2014
(England)	Ian Kirke	Wakefield Trinity Wildcats	1 Year	November 2014
(England)	Alex Foster	Featherstone Rovers	1 Year Loan	November 2014
(England)	Thomas Minns	Featherstone Rovers	1 Year Loan	November 2014
(England)	Jordan Baldwinson	Featherstone Rovers	1 Year Loan	November 2014
(England)	Mason Tonks	Featherstone Rovers	1 Year Loan	November 2014
(England)	Luke Briscoe	Hunslet Hawks	dual registration	January 2015
(England)	Robbie Ward	Hunslet Hawks	dual registration	January 2015
(England)	Rob Mulhern	Hunslet Hawks	dual registration	January 2015
(England)	James Duckworth	Hunslet Hawks	dual registration	January 2015

== Competitions ==
=== Super League ===
Table

Pos	Team	Pld	W	D	L	PF	PA	PD	Pts	Qualification
1	Leeds Rhinos	23	16	1	6	758	477	+281	33	Super League Super 8s
2	St Helens	23	16	0	7	598	436	+162	32	Super League Super 8s
3	Wigan Warriors	23	15	1	7	589	413	+176	31	Super League Super 8s
4	Huddersfield Giants	23	13	2	8	538	394	+144	28	Super League Super 8s
5	Castleford Tigers	23	13	0	10	547	505	+42	26	Super League Super 8s
6	Warrington Wolves	23	12	0	11	552	456	+96	24	Super League Super 8s
7	Hull F.C.	23	11	0	12	452	484	−32	22	Super League Super 8s
8	Catalans Dragons	23	9	2	12	561	574	−13	20	Super League Super 8s
9	Widnes Vikings	23	9	1	13	518	565	−47	19	The Qualifiers
10	Hull Kingston Rovers	23	9	0	14	534	646	−112	18	The Qualifiers
11	Salford Red Devils	23	8	1	14	447	617	−170	17	The Qualifiers
12	Wakefield Trinity Wildcats	23	3	0	20	402	929	−527	6	The Qualifiers

Source: Rugby League Project
Rules for classification: 1) Points; 2) Points difference; 3) Number of points scored;

==== Results ====
LEGEND
Win
Draw
Loss

Date	Rnd	Home	Score	Away	Venue	Tries	Goals	Att
8/2/15	1	Hull Kingston Rovers	30-40	Leeds Rhinos	Craven Park	Briscoe, Sinfield, McGuire (2), Watkins, Hardaker, Singleton	Sinfield 6/7	11,811
13/2/15	2	Leeds Rhinos	38-6	Widnes	Headingley Stadium	Hardaker, Hall, Cuthbertson, Briscoe, McGuire, Watkins, Sinfield	Sinfield 5/7	14,132
26/2/15	3	Leeds Rhinos	28-24	Huddersfield	Headingley Stadium	Ablett, Cuthbertson, Hall, Briscoe, Aiton	Sinfield 4/5	12,878
5/3/15	4	Hull FC	12-43	Leeds Rhinos	KC Stadium	McGuire (2), Singleton, Watkins, Leuluai, Burrow (2)	Sinfield 7/7, Sinfield 1 DG	10,887
13/3/15	5	Warrington	18-6	Leeds Rhinos	Halliwell Jones Stadium	Briscoe	Sinfield 1/1	10,075
20/3/15	6	Leeds Rhinos	26-14	Wigan	Headingley Stadium	Cuthbertson, Handley, Singleton, Sutcliffe, Burrow	Sutcliffe 3/6	18,350
28/3/15	7	Catalans Dragons	22-38	Leeds Rhinos	Stade Gilbert Brutus	Ablett, S.Ward, Singleton, McGuire, Sutcliffe, Watkins, Hardaker	Sutcliffe 5/7	8,876
3/4/15	8	Castleford	12-26	Leeds Rhinos	The Jungle	Moon, Hall (2), S.Ward, Cuthbertson	Sutcliffe 3/5	11,323
6/4/15	9	Leeds Rhinos	48-22	Wakefield Trinity	Headingley Stadium	Hall, Hardaker, Burrow (2), Watkins (2), Handley, Yates	Sinfield 8/8	17,608
12/4/15	10	Salford	18-28	Leeds Rhinos	AJ Bell Stadium	Peacock (2), Handley, Burrow, Hardaker	Sinfield 4/5	4,000
17/4/15	11	St. Helens	16-41	Leeds Rhinos	Langtree Park	Handley (3), Hardaker, McGuire, Sutcliffe, Moon	Sutcliffe 3/4, Sinfield 3/3, Sinfield 1 DG	12,640
24/4/15	12	Leeds Rhinos	10-29	Warrington	Headingley Stadium	Watkins, Achurch	Sutcliffe 0/1, Sinfield 1/1	17,430
30/4/15	13	Huddersfield	24-24	Leeds Rhinos	Galpharm Stadium	Delaney, Ablett, Moon, Watkins	Sutcliffe 4/5	6,381
10/5/15	14	Widnes	38-24	Leeds Rhinos	Halton Stadium	S.Ward, Moon, Watkins (2), Keinhorst	Sutcliffe 2/5	6,113
22/5/15	15	Leeds Rhinos	36-16	Hull Kingston Rovers	Headingley Stadium	S.Ward, Achurch, Hall (2), Singleton, Sinfield	Sinfield 6/6	15,206
30/5/15	16	Wigan	27-12	Leeds Rhinos	St James' Park	Cuthbertson, Moon	Sinfield 2/2	40,871
7/6/15	17	Wakefield Trinity	26-58	Leeds Rhinos	Belle Vue	Sutcliffe (3), McGuire, Burrow, Ablett, Handley (2), Keinhorst, Singleton (2)	Sinfield 5/7, Sutcliffe 2/4	4,000
11/6/15	18	Leeds Rhinos	24-31	Castleford	Headingley Stadium	Ablett, Hall, Cuthbertson, Keinhorst	Sutcliffe 2/3, Sinfield 2/2	15,089
21/6/15	19	Leeds Rhinos	32-20	Hull FC	Headingley Stadium	McGuire, Moon (2), Keinhorst, Ablett	Sutcliffe 1/2, Sinfield 5/5	16,203
3/7/15	20	Leeds Rhinos	46-18	St. Helens	Headingley Stadium	Watkins, Leuluai, Hall (2), Handley (3), Ablett	Sinfield 7/8	18,514
9/7/15	21	Wigan	26-24	Leeds Rhinos	DW Stadium	Aiton, Singleton, Handley, Burrow	Sinfield 4/4	15,009
17/7/15	22	Leeds Rhinos	70-6	Salford	Headingley Stadium	McGuire, Cuthbertson, Watkins, Delaney, Hardaker (2), Hall (2), Moon, Keinhorst, Walters, Ablett	Hardaker 9/13	14,190
26/7/15	23	Leeds Rhinos	36-22	Catalans Dragons	Headingley Stadium	Briscoe (3), Garbutt, Watkins, Delaney	Sinfield 6/6	15,534

==== Super 8s ====
Pos	Team	Pld	W	D	L	PF	PA	PD	Pts	Qualification
1	Leeds Rhinos (L, C)	30	20	1	9	944	650	+294	41	Semi-finals
2	Wigan Warriors	30	20	1	9	798	530	+268	41	Semi-finals
3	Huddersfield Giants	30	18	2	10	750	534	+216	38	Semi-finals
4	St Helens	30	19	0	11	766	624	+142	38	Semi-finals
5	Castleford Tigers	30	16	0	14	731	746	−15	32	
6	Warrington Wolves	30	15	0	15	714	636	+78	30	
7	Catalans Dragons	30	13	2	15	739	770	−31	28	
8	Hull F.C.	30	12	0	18	620	716	−96	24	

Source: Rugby League Project
(C) Champions; (L) League Leaders' Shield Winners

Date	Rnd	Home	Score	Away	Venue	Tries	Goals	Att
7/8/15	24	Leeds Rhinos	49-10	Warrington	Headingley Stadium	Watkins, Briscoe, Hardaker (2), McGuire, Moon, Burrow, Ablett	Sinfield 8/8, Sinfield 1 DG	13,118
14/8/15	25	Leeds Rhinos	25-18	Wigan	Headingley Stadium	McGuire, Moon, Hall, Watkins	Sinfield 4/4, Hardaker 1 DG	15,026
21/8/15	26	Hull FC	36-22	Leeds Rhinos	KC Stadium	Handley, Ablett, Burrow (2), Hall, Briscoe	Sinfield 6/6	7,900
4/9/15	27	Leeds Rhinos	18-32	St. Helens	Headingley Stadium	Keinhorst, Achurch, Hall	Sinfield 3/3	16,142
12/9/15	28	Catalans Dragons	46-16	Leeds Rhinos	Stade Gilbert Brutus	Hall, McGuire, Moon	Sinfield 2/3	8,851
17/9/15	29	Leeds Rhinos	22-29	Castleford	Headingley Stadium	Hall (2), Moon, Cuthbertson	Sinfield 2/3, Lilley 1/1	15,069
25/9/15	30	Huddersfield	16-20	Leeds Rhinos	Galpharm Stadium	S.Ward, Briscoe, Hall	Sinfield 4/4	9,326

==== Playoffs ====
Date	Rnd	Home	Score	Away	Venue	Tries	Goals	Att
2/10/15	Semi Final	Leeds Rhinos	20-13	St. Helens	Headingley Stadium	Hardaker, Hall, Watkins	Sinfield 4/4	17,192
10/10/15	Grand Final	Leeds Rhinos	22-20	Wigan	Old Trafford	McGuire (2), Moon, Walters	Sinfield 3/4	73,512

2015 Super League Grand Final
Leeds Rhinos	positions	Wigan Warriors
1. Zak Hardaker	Fullback	1. Matty Bowen
2. Tom Briscoe	Winger	22. Dominic Manfredi
3. Kallum Watkins	Centre	14. John Bateman
4. Joel Moon	Centre	34. Oliver Gildart
5. Ryan Hall	Winger	5. Joe Burgess
13. Kevin Sinfield (c)	Stand Off	6. George Williams
6. Danny McGuire	Scrum half	7. Matty Smith
30. Mitch Garbutt	Prop	8. Dom Crosby
7. Rob Burrow	Hooker	9. Michael McIlorum
10. Jamie Peacock	Prop	10. Ben Flower
12. Carl Ablett	Second Row	11. Joel Tomkins
15. Brett Delaney	Second Row	12. Liam Farrell
19. Brad Singleton	Loose forward	13. Sean O'Loughlin (c)
8. Kylie Leuluai	Interchange	16. Sam Powell
17. Adam Cuthbertson	Interchange	17. Tony Clubb
20. Jimmy Keinhorst	Interchange	23. Lee Mossop
21. Josh Walters	Interchange	25. Larne Patrick
Brian McDermott	Coach	Shaun Wane

=== Challenge Cup ===
LEGEND
Win
Draw
Loss

Date	Rnd	Home	Score	Away	Venue	Tries	Goals	Att
16/5/15	6th	Leeds Rhinos	48-16	Huddersfield	Headingley Stadium	Watkins (2), Hall (2), Aiton, McGuire, Cuthbertson, Ablett	Sinfield 8/8	8,133
26/6/15	QF	Hull FC	6-24	Leeds Rhinos	KC Stadium	Moon, Watkins, Hardaker	Sinfield 6/6	9,261
31/7/15	SF	Leeds Rhinos	24-14	St. Helens	Halliwell Jones Stadium	Hardaker, Moon, Peacock, Watkins	Sinfield 4/4	11,107
29/8/15	Final	Leeds Rhinos	50-0	Hull Kingston Rovers	Wembley Stadium	Delaney, McGuire, Briscoe (5), Singleton, Burrow	Sinfield 7/9	80,140

== Club vs. Country ==
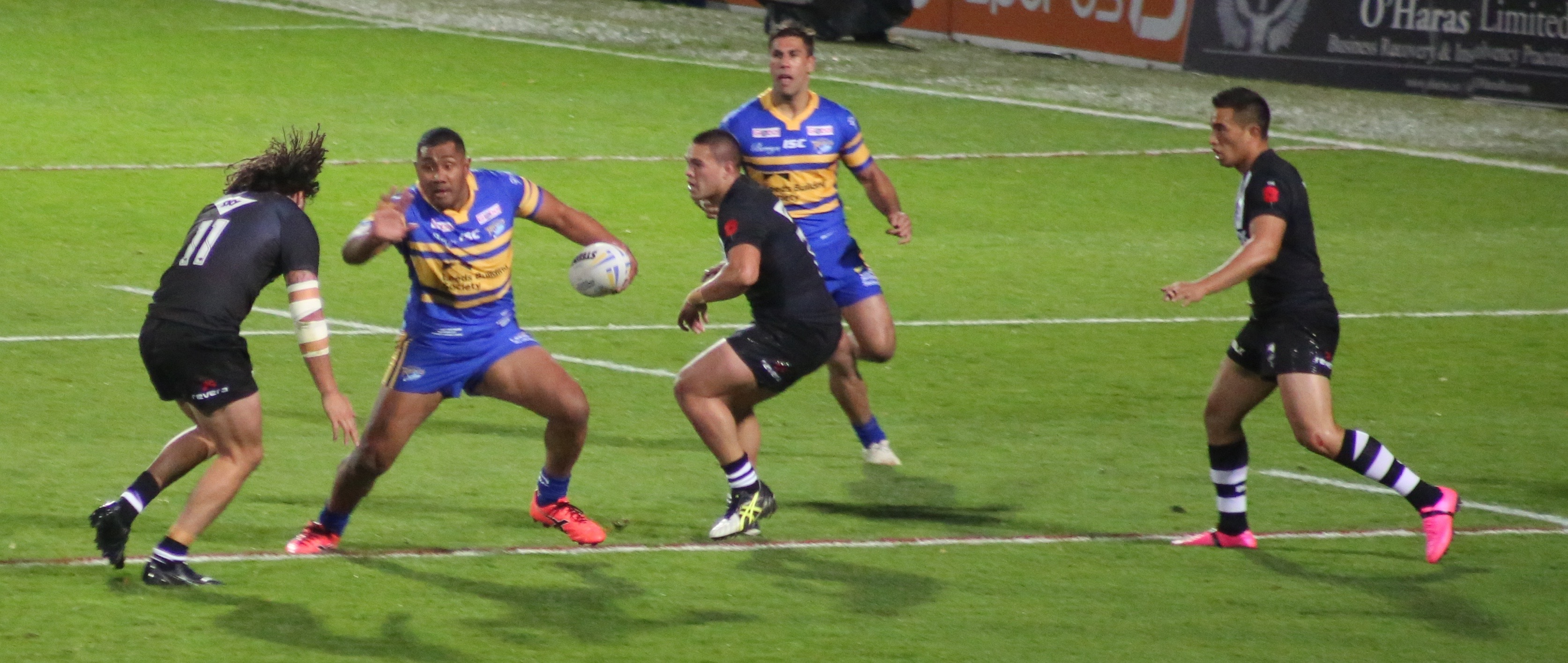
New Zealand vs Leeds Rhinos in Game 1 of the 2015 Kiwi tour

As part of their 2015 Kiwi tour of England the New Zealand national rugby league team played a match against Leeds, winning 34 - 16. The match was the first time Leeds had played the Kiwis since 1992. The match celebrated the 125th anniversary of Headingley Stadium. Prior to the match, Leeds had defeated New Zealand once in eleven matches between the two teams.

LEGEND
Win
Draw
Loss

Date	Competition	Vrs	H/A	Venue	Result	Score	Tries	Goals	Att
23 October 2015	2015 Kiwis Tour	New Zealand	H	Headingley Stadium	L	16-34	Moon (2), Briscoe	Lilley (2/3)	20,158

2015 Club vs. Country Teams
Leeds Rhinos	positions	New Zealand
Ashton Golding	Fullback	Roger Tuivasa-Sheck
Tom Briscoe	Winger	Jason Nightingale
Jimmy Keinhorst	Centre	Jordan Kahu
Joel Moon	Centre	Dean Whare
Ash Handley	Winger	Shaun Kenny-Dowall
Danny McGuire	Stand Off	Peta Hiku
Jordan Lilley	Scrum half	Tuimoala Lolohea
Kylie Leuluai	Prop	Jesse Bromwich
Robbie Ward	Hooker	Issac Luke
Mitch Garbutt	Prop	Ben Matulino
Adrian Morley	2nd Row	Kevin Proctor
Josh Walters	2nd Row	Tohu Harris
Adam Cuthbertson	Loose forward	Martin Taupau
Ali Lauitiiti	Interchange	Kodi Nikorima
Anthony Mullally	Interchange	Adam Blair
Mitch Achurch	Interchange	Sam Moa
Jordan Baldwinson	Interchange	Sio Siua Taukeiaho
Robbie Mulhern	Interchange	Alex Glenn
Brad Singleton	Interchange	Lewis Brown
Brian McDermott	Coach	Stephen Kearney
