= 2015 New Zealand rugby league tour of England =

Rugby matches

2015 Kiwi tour
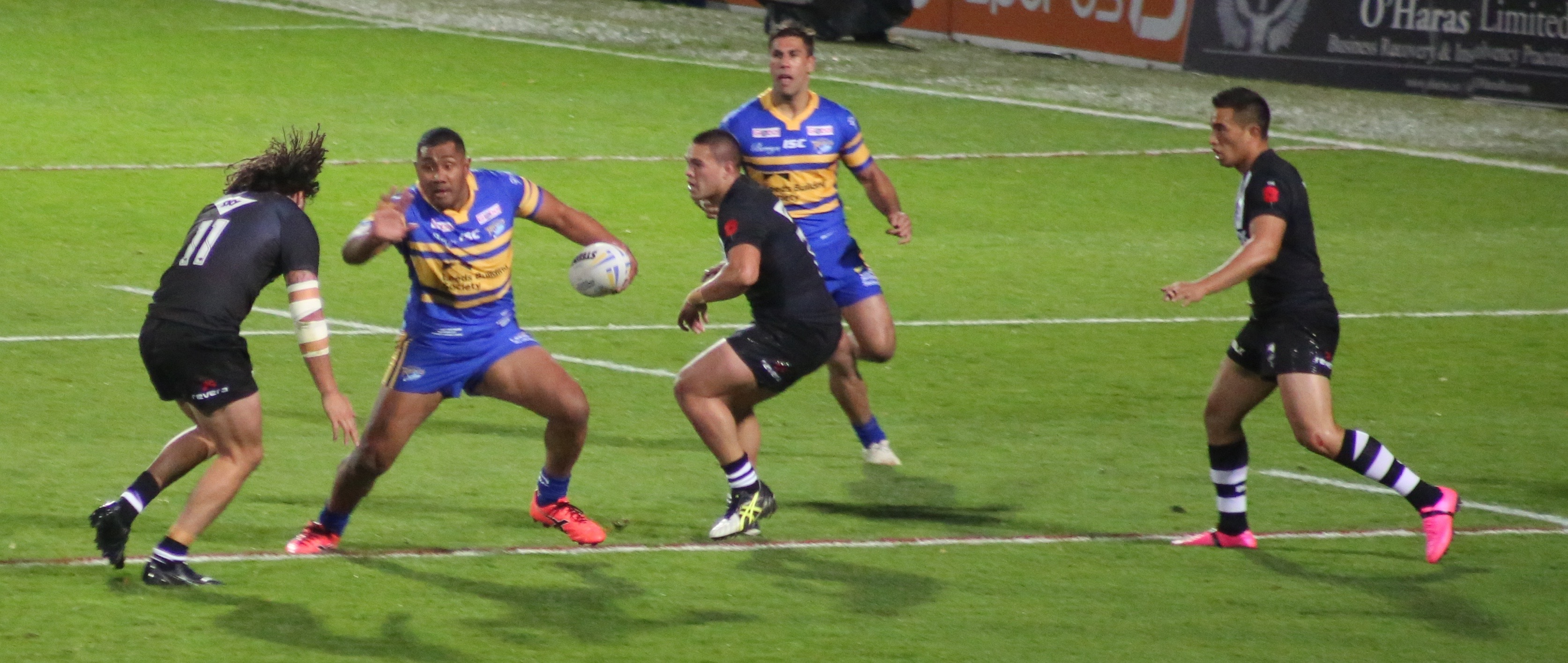
- New Zealand vs Leeds Rhinos in Game 1 of the tour
- Date: 23 October 2015 – 14 November 2015
Summary
P	W	D	L
Total
4	2	0	2
Test match
3	1	0	2
Opponent
P	W	D	L
Leeds Rhinos
1	1	0	0
England
3	1	0	2

Tour chronology
- Previous tour: 2007
- Next tour: 2018

The 2015 New Zealand rugby league tour of England was a tour by the New Zealand national rugby league team. The New Zealand national rugby league team played a match against the Leeds Rhinos and competed in a three match test series against England for the Baskerville Shield, losing 2-1.

== Background ==
RLIF World Rankings
Official Rankings as of May 2015
Rank	Change	Team	Points
1	▲	New Zealand	949.00
3	Steady	England	485.00

New Zealand had originally intended to host a tour against France, while Australia was speculated to host a Great Britain Lions tour. However the Australian Rugby League Commission declined to host a tour and as an alternative the Rugby Football League invited the New Zealand Rugby League to tour Great Britain for a three match series.

On 25 February 2015, the three test match venues were confirmed with Hull's KC Stadium hosting game one on 1 November, the London Olympic Stadium hosting the second test on 7 November and the final test match being held at Wigan's DW Stadium on 14 November.

The match against Leeds was the first time a Super League side had played a touring side since 2002, when the Kiwis played matches against Hull F.C. and St. Helens. It was the first time that Leeds played New Zealand since 1992. The match celebrated the 125th anniversary of Headingley. Leeds has defeated New Zealand once in eleven matches between the two teams.

== Squad ==
=== Training squad ===
An initial training squad was named on 8 September 2015 and added to as teams were eliminated from the NRL finals. Kieran Foran was among those initially named but he later withdrew due to injury, joining Shaun Johnson, Thomas Leuluai, Manu Vatuvei, Dallin Watene-Zelezniak and Jared Warea-Hargreaves as being unavailable for the tour. Skipper Simon Mannering was also later made unavailable for the test series due to injury.

Club Team	Players
Squad named on 8 September
Manly Sea Eagles	Kieran Foran, Peta Hiku
New Zealand Warriors	Solomone Kata, Tui Lolohea, Simon Mannering (c), Ben Matulino, Bodene Thompson
Parramatta Eels	Manu Mau
Penrith Panthers	Lewis Brown, Sam McKendry, Elijah Taylor, Dean Whare
Wests Tigers	Manaia Cherrington, Tim Simona, Martin Taupau
Added on 18 September
South Sydney Rabbitohs	Bryson Goodwin, Issac Luke
St George Illawarra Dragons	Jason Nightingale
Added on 24 September
Canterbury Bulldogs	Curtis Rona, Greg Eastwood
Cronulla Sharks	Gerard Beale, Sosaia Feki
Wests Tigers	Te Maire Martin
Added on 1 October
Melbourne Storm	Jesse Bromwich, Tohu Harris, Kevin Proctor
Sydney Roosters	Matt McIlwrick, Sio Siua Taukeiaho, Isaac Liu, Roger Tuivasa-Sheck, Shaun Kenny-Dowall, Sam Moa

=== Final squad ===
The final touring squad of 23 players was named on 8 October.

On 10 October, Jason Taumalolo withdrew from the touring 23-man squad due to a knee injury. He was replaced by Manaia Cherrington. Curtis Rona left the tour after the second test match, returning to Australia to be present for the birth of his daughter.

Name	Club	Position(s)	Games	Tries	Goals	FGs	Points
Gerard Beale	Cronulla-Sutherland Sharks	Centre	0	0	0	0	0
Adam Blair (c)	Brisbane Broncos	Prop, Second-row	4	0	0	0	0
Jesse Bromwich	Melbourne Storm	Prop	4	1	0	0	4
Lewis Brown	Penrith Panthers	Second-row	3	0	0	0	0
Manaia Cherrington	Wests Tigers	Hooker	0	0	0	0	0
Alex Glenn	Brisbane Broncos	Second-row	3	0	0	0	0
Tohu Harris	Melbourne Storm	Second-row	4	1	0	0	4
Peta Hiku	Manly Sea Eagles	Fullback	4	0	0	0	0
Jordan Kahu	Brisbane Broncos	Fullback, Wing, Centre	4	2	1	1	11
Shaun Kenny-Dowall	Sydney Roosters	Wing, Centre	4	1	0	0	4
Isaac Liu	Sydney Roosters	Lock	0	0	0	0	0
Tuimoala Lolohea	New Zealand Warriors	Fullback, Wing, Five-eighth	2	0	2	0	4
Issac Luke (c)	South Sydney Rabbitohs	Hooker	4	0	4	0	8
Ben Matulino	New Zealand Warriors	Prop	4	0	0	0	0
Sam Moa	Sydney Roosters	Prop	4	1	0	0	4
Jason Nightingale	St. George Illawarra Dragons	Wing	4	2	0	0	8
Kodi Nikorima	Brisbane Broncos	Fullback, Halfback, Hooker	4	1	0	0	4
Kevin Proctor	Melbourne Storm	Second-row	4	0	0	0	0
Curtis Rona	Canterbury Bulldogs	Wing	0	0	0	0	0
Sio Siua Taukeiaho	Sydney Roosters	Second-row	2	0	0	0	0
Martin Taupau	Wests Tigers	Lock	4	0	0	0	0
Roger Tuivasa-Sheck	Sydney Roosters	Fullback	4	3	0	0	12
Dean Whare	Penrith Panthers	Centre	4	1	0	0	4

== Tour summary ==
New Zealand played four matches on tour, including three test matches against England.

Date	Opponent	Venue	Result	Score	Attendance	Report
23 October	Leeds Rhinos	Headingley, Leeds	Won	34–16	20,158	
1 November	England	KC Stadium, Kingston upon Hull	Lost	12–26	23,526	
7 November	England	Olympic Stadium, London	Won	9–2	44,393	
14 November	England	DW Stadium, Wigan	Lost	14–20	24,741	

== Kiwis vs Rhinos: Headingley 125th anniversary match ==
Gerard Beale was originally named to play but was replaced by Lewis Brown.

The match was shown on Premier Sports and Sky Sport 2

23 October 2015

Leeds Rhinos	16–34	New Zealand
Tries: Moon (2) 28' c, 55' c Briscoe 73'; Goal: Lilley (2/3) 29', 56'		Tries: Nightingale 37' c Kahu 40'; Bromwich 63' c Whare 66'; Tuivasa-Sheck (2) 69', 80'; Nikorima 78' c Goal: Luke (1/2) 38'; Lolohea (2/5) 63', 78'

Headingley Rugby Stadium, Leeds
Attendance: 20,158
Referee: (England) Richard Silverwood

FB	1	Ashton Golding
RW	2	Tom Briscoe
RC	3	Jimmy Keinhorst
LC	4	Joel Moon
LW	5	Ash Handley
SO	6	Danny McGuire
SH	7	Jordan Lilley
PR	8	Kylie Leuluai
HK	9	Robbie Ward
PR	10	Mitch Garbutt
SR	11	Adrian Morley
SR	12	Josh Walters
LF	13	Adam Cuthbertson
Substitutions:
BE	14	Ali Lauitiiti
BE	15	Anthony Mullally
BE	16	Mitch Achurch
BE	17	Jordan Baldwinson
BE	18	Rob Mulhern
BE	19	Brad Singleton
Coach:
Brian McDermott

FB	1	Roger Tuivasa-Sheck
RW	2	Jason Nightingale
RC	3	Jordan Kahu
LC	4	Dean Whare
LW	5	Shaun Kenny-Dowall
FE	6	Peta Hiku
HB	7	Tuimoala Lolohea
PR	8	Jesse Bromwich
HK	9	Issac Luke (Captain)
PR	10	Ben Matulino
SR	11	Kevin Proctor
SR	12	Tohu Harris
LK	13	Martin Taupau
Substitutions:
BE	14	Kodi Nikorima
BE	15	Adam Blair (Captain)
BE	16	Sam Moa
BE	17	Sio Siua Taukeiaho
BE	18	Alex Glenn
BE	20	Lewis Brown
Coach:
Stephen Kearney

== Baskerville Shield ==
Ahead of New Zealand's Baskerville Shield series against England, their opponents had played a warm-up test match against France on 24 October.

All futures were shown on BBC Sport in the UK, and Sky Sport 2 in New Zealand.

=== Venues ===
Hull	London	Wigan
KC Stadium	Olympic Park	DW Stadium
Capacity: 25,400	Capacity: 66,000	Capacity: 25,138

=== Test 1 ===
1 November 2015

England	26–12	New Zealand
Try: Hodgson 21' c Ferres (2) 36' c, 59' c O'Loughlin 77' c Goal: Widdop (5/5) 21', 36', 46', 59', 77'		Try: Harris 7'; Moa 17' c Goal: Luke (2/3) 17', 27'

KC Stadium, Kingston-upon-Hull
Attendance: 23,526
Referee: (England) Ben Thaler

FB	1	Zak Hardaker
RW	2	Joe Burgess
RC	3	Kallum Watkins
LC	4	John Bateman
LW	5	Ryan Hall
SO	6	Gareth Widdop
SH	7	George Williams
PR	8	James Graham
HK	9	Josh Hodgson
PR	10	Chris Hill
SR	11	Elliott Whitehead
SR	12	Liam Farrell
LF	13	Sean O'Loughlin (Captain)
Substitutions:
BE	14	James Roby
BE	15	Tom Burgess
BE	16	Michael Cooper
BE	17	Brett Ferres
Coach:
Steve McNamara

FB	1	Roger Tuivasa-Sheck
RW	2	Jason Nightingale
RC	3	Jordan Kahu
LC	4	Dean Whare
LW	5	Shaun Kenny-Dowall
FE	6	Peta Hiku
HB	7	Tuimoala Lolohea
PR	8	Jesse Bromwich
HK	9	Issac Luke (Captain)
PR	10	Sam Moa
SR	11	Kevin Proctor
SR	12	Tohu Harris
LK	13	Adam Blair (Captain)
Substitutions:
BE	14	Kodi Nikorima
BE	15	Martin Taupau
BE	16	Ben Matulino
BE	17	Sio Siua Taukeiaho
Coach:
Stephen Kearney

Alex Glenn and Lewis Brown were named as 18th and 19th man respectively for the Kiwis.

=== Test 2 ===
7 November 2015

England	2–9	New Zealand
Goal: Widdop (1/1) 8'		Try: Kenny-Dowall 43' c Goal: Luke (1/2) 14'; Kahu (1/1) 43'; Drop Goal: Kahu (1/1) 77'

Olympic Park, London
Attendance: 44,393
Referee: (Australia) Gerard Sutton

FB	1	Zak Hardaker
RW	2	Joe Burgess
RC	3	Kallum Watkins
LC	4	John Bateman
LW	5	Ryan Hall
SO	6	Gareth Widdop
SH	7	George Williams
PR	8	James Graham
HK	9	Josh Hodgson
PR	10	Chris Hill
SR	11	Elliott Whitehead
SR	12	Liam Farrell
LF	13	Sean O'Loughlin (Captain)
Substitutions:
BE	14	James Roby
BE	15	Tom Burgess
BE	16	Michael Cooper
BE	17	Brett Ferres
Coach:
Steve McNamara

FB	1	Roger Tuivasa-Sheck
RW	2	Jason Nightingale
RC	3	Jordan Kahu
LC	4	Dean Whare
LW	5	Shaun Kenny-Dowall
FE	6	Peta Hiku
HB	19	Kodi Nikorima
PR	8	Jesse Bromwich
HK	9	Issac Luke (Captain)
PR	10	Sam Moa
SR	11	Kevin Proctor
SR	12	Tohu Harris
LK	13	Adam Blair (Captain)
Substitutions:
BE	14	Lewis Brown
BE	15	Martin Taupau
BE	16	Ben Matulino
BE	17	Alex Glenn
Coach:
Stephen Kearney

Stephen Kearney originally named Tuimoala Lolohea at halfback before selecting Kodi Nikorima to start the match.

=== Test 3 ===
14 November 2015

England	20–14	New Zealand
Try: Whitehead (2) 27' c, 63' c O'Loughlin 72' c Goal: Widdop (4/4) 5', 27', 63', 72'		Try: Nightingale 36' c Tuivasa-Sheck 75'; Kahu 79'; Goal: Luke (1/3) 36'

DW Stadium, Wigan
Attendance: 24,741
Referee: (England) Ben Thaler

FB	1	Zak Hardaker
RW	2	Jermaine McGillvary
RC	3	Kallum Watkins
LC	4	John Bateman
LW	5	Ryan Hall
SO	6	Gareth Widdop
SH	7	Matty Smith
PR	8	James Graham
HK	9	Josh Hodgson
PR	10	Chris Hill
SR	11	Elliott Whitehead
SR	12	Liam Farrell
LF	13	Sean O'Loughlin (Captain)
Substitutions:
BE	14	James Roby
BE	15	Tom Burgess
BE	16	Michael Cooper
BE	17	Brett Ferres
Coach:
Steve McNamara

FB	1	Roger Tuivasa-Sheck
RW	2	Jason Nightingale
RC	3	Jordan Kahu
LC	4	Dean Whare
LW	5	Shaun Kenny-Dowall
FE	6	Peta Hiku
HB	7	Kodi Nikorima
PR	8	Jesse Bromwich
HK	9	Issac Luke (Captain)
PR	10	Sam Moa
SR	11	Kevin Proctor
SR	12	Tohu Harris
LK	13	Adam Blair (Captain)
Substitutions:
BE	14	Lewis Brown
BE	15	Martin Taupau
BE	16	Ben Matulino
BE	17	Alex Glenn
Coach:
Stephen Kearney

With the win, England retained the Baskerville Shield. Isaac Liu and Gerard Beale were 18th and 19th man respectively for New Zealand.

== Aftermath ==
England's captain, Sean O'Loughlin was awarded the George Smith Medal as player of the series.

England's retained the Baskerville Shield, 8 years after it was last contested during the 2007 All Golds Tour.
