= 2016 Leeds Rhinos season =

- Super League Rank: 9th
- Challenge Cup: Sixth Round
- 2016 record: Wins: 14; draws: 0; losses: 18
- Points scored: For: 673; against: 740

Team information
- Chairman: (England) Paul Caddick
- Head Coach: (England) Brian McDermott
- Captain: (England) Danny McGuire
- Stadium: Headingley Stadium
- High attendance: 17,131 (v St Helens)

Top scorers
- Tries: (England) Kallum Watkins (18)
- Goals: (England) Liam Sutcliffe (54)
- Points: (England) Liam Sutcliffe (144)
← 2015	List of seasons	2017 →

This article details the Leeds Rhinos rugby league football club's 2016 season. This was the Leeds Rhinos' 21st season in the Super League. Leeds Rhinos were the reigning winners of the Super League Grand Final, Super League Leaders' Shield and the Challenge Cup, after they became only the third team in the Super League era to win the treble in 2015.

Leeds Rhinos finished in 9th position after 23 rounds, their lowest finish since 1996, before demotion to The Qualifiers. Leeds Rhinos then finished 1st in The Qualifiers, winning six of their seven matches, to maintain their Super League status for the 2017 season.

== Players ==
- Appearances and points include (Super League, Challenge Cup and Qualifiers) as of 22 September 2016.

No	Player	Position	Previous club	Apps	Tries	Goals	DG	Points
1	(England) Zak Hardaker	Fullback	Featherstone Rovers	18	1	4	0	12
2	(England) Tom Briscoe	Winger	Hull F.C.	13	9	0	0	36
3	(England) Kallum Watkins	Centre	Academy	33	18	4	0	80
4	(Australia) Joel Moon	Centre	Salford Red Devils	21	8	0	1	33
5	(England) Ryan Hall	Wing	Academy	19	7	0	0	28
6	(England) Danny McGuire	Stand off	Academy	13	0	0	0	0
7	(England) Rob Burrow	Scrum half	Academy	28	6	0	0	24
8	(Australia) Keith Galloway	Prop	Wests Tigers	30	1	0	0	4
9	(Australia) Beau Falloon	Hooker	Gold Coast Titans	11	0	0	0	0
10	(Australia) Adam Cuthbertson	Prop	Newcastle Knights	26	4	0	0	16
11	(England) Jamie Jones-Buchanan	Second row	Academy	27	4	0	0	16
12	(England) Carl Ablett	Second row	Academy	18	4	0	0	16
13	(England) Stevie Ward	Loose forward	Academy	4	0	0	0	0
14	(England) Liam Sutcliffe	Stand off	Academy	31	9	54	0	144
15	(Australia) Brett Delaney	Second row	Gold Coast Titans	13	0	0	0	0
16	(Republic of Ireland) Brad Singleton	Prop	Academy	26	3	0	0	12
17	(Australia) Mitch Garbutt	Prop	Brisbane Broncos	23	2	0	0	8
18	(Germany) Jimmy Keinhorst	Centre	Academy	29	10	0	0	40
19	(Australia) Mitch Achurch	Second row	Penrith Panthers	24	5	0	0	20
20	(Republic of Ireland) Anthony Mullally	Prop	Huddersfield Giants	21	2	0	0	8
21	(England) Josh Walters	Second row	Academy	19	5	0	0	20
22	(England) Ash Handley	Wing	Academy	24	7	0	0	28
23	(Jamaica) Ashton Golding	Fullback	Academy	17	5	0	0	20
24	(England) Jordan Baldwinson	Loose forward	Featherstone Rovers	2	0	0	0	0
25	(England) Jordan Lilley	Scrum half	Academy	28	5	41	1	103
26	(England) Brett Ferres	Second row	Huddersfield Giants	26	5	0	0	20
27	(England) Sam Hallas	Hooker	Academy	3	0	0	0	0
28	(England) Cameron Smith	Second row	Academy	2	0	0	0	0
29	(England) Luke Briscoe	Wing	Academy	7	1	0	0	4
30	(Papua New Guinea) James Segeyaro	Hooker	Penrith Panthers	10	6	0	0	24

=== Transfers ===
In

Nat	Name	Signed from	Contract	Announced	Reference
(Republic of Ireland)	Anthony Mullally	Huddersfield Giants	3 Years	May 2015	
(Australia)	Keith Galloway	Wests Tigers	3 Years	July 2015	
(England)	Jordan Baldwinson	Featherstone Rovers	2 Years	October 2015	
(Australia)	Beau Falloon	Gold Coast Titans	1 Year	October 2015	
(England)	Brett Ferres	Huddersfield Giants	1 Year	January 2016	
	James Segeyaro	Penrith Panthers	1 Year	June 2016	

Out

Nat	Name	Signed for	Contract	Announced	Reference
(England)	Jamie Peacock	Retirement	N/A	March 2015	
(England)	Kevin Sinfield	Yorkshire Carnegie	2 Years	March 2015	
(New Zealand)	Kylie Leuluai	Retirement	N/A	June 2015	
(England)	Thomas Minns	Hull Kingston Rovers	3 Years	July 2015	
(Papua New Guinea)	Paul Aiton	Catalans Dragons	3 Years	August 2015	
(England)	Mason Tonks	Doncaster	1 Year	September 2015	
(England)	George Milton	Doncaster	1 Year	September 2015	
(England)	Chris Clarkson	Hull Kingston Rovers	2 Years	October 2015	
(England)	Alex Foster	London Broncos	1 Year	October 2015	
(England)	James Duckworth	Hunslet Hawks	1 Year	October 2015	
(England)	Elliott Minchella	Sheffield Eagles	2 Years	November 2015	
(England)	Robbie Ward	Sunshine Coast Falcons	2 Years	November 2015	
(England)	Rob Mulhern	Hull Kingston Rovers	2 Years	December 2015	
(England)	Zak Hardaker	Penrith Panthers	1 Year	June 2016	
(England)	Luke Briscoe	Featherstone Rovers	1 Year	July 2016	
(England)	Jordan Baldwinson	Featherstone Rovers	1 Year	July 2016	
(England)	Josh Walters	Featherstone Rovers	1 Year	July 2016	

== Competitions ==
=== Super League ===
==== Table ====
Pos	Team	Pld	W	D	L	PF	PA	PD	Pts	Qualification
1	Hull F.C.	23	17	0	6	605	465	+140	34	Super League Super 8s
2	Warrington Wolves	23	16	1	6	675	425	+250	33	Super League Super 8s
3	Wigan Warriors	23	16	0	7	455	440	+15	32	Super League Super 8s
4	St Helens	23	14	0	9	573	536	+37	28	Super League Super 8s
5	Catalans Dragons	23	13	0	10	593	505	+88	26	Super League Super 8s
6	Castleford Tigers	23	10	1	12	617	640	−23	21	Super League Super 8s
7	Widnes Vikings	23	10	0	13	499	474	+25	20	Super League Super 8s
8	Wakefield Trinity Wildcats	23	10	0	13	485	654	−169	20	Super League Super 8s
9	Leeds Rhinos	23	8	0	15	404	576	−172	16	The Qualifiers
10	Salford Red Devils	23	10	0	13	560	569	−9	14 (Note: Salford deducted 6 points for salary cap breaches in 2014 and 2015.)	The Qualifiers
11	Hull Kingston Rovers	23	6	2	15	486	610	−124	14	The Qualifiers
12	Huddersfield Giants	23	6	0	17	511	569	−58	12	The Qualifiers

Source: Rugby League Project
Rules for classification: 1) Points; 2) Points difference; 3) Number of points scored;

==== Results ====
Key
Win
Draw
Loss

Date	Rnd	Home	Score	Away	Venue	Tries	Goals	Att
4/2/16	1	Leeds Rhinos	10-12	Warrington	Headingley Stadium	Singleton, Hall	Hardaker 1/2	16,168
14/2/16	2	Widnes	56-12	Leeds Rhinos	Halton Stadium	Watkins, Burrow	Lilley 2/2	6,596
27/2/16	3	Catalans Dragons	32-28	Leeds Rhinos	Stade Gilbert Brutus	Watkins (2), Sutcliffe, Hall, Handley	Lilley 4/5	8,172
4/3/16	4	Leeds Rhinos	20-16	Huddersfield	Headingley Stadium	Moon, Sutcliffe, Keinhorst	Lilley 4/4	14,962
11/3/16	5	Wigan	28-6	Leeds Rhinos	DW Stadium	Hardaker	Hardaker 1/1	14,425
18/3/16	6	Leeds Rhinos	30-18	St. Helens	Headingley Stadium	Jones-Buchanan, Cuthbertson, Sutcliffe, Ablett, Handley	Sutcliffe 5/6	17,131
24/3/16	7	Castleford	18-14	Leeds Rhinos	The Jungle	Moon, Watkins, Briscoe	Sutcliffe 1/3	11,426
28/3/16	8	Leeds Rhinos	16-20	Wakefield Trinity	Headingley Stadium	Moon, Briscoe, Achurch	Sutcliffe 2/3	16,314
1/4/16	9	Leeds Rhinos	10-30	Hull Kingston Rovers	Headingley Stadium	Jones-Buchanan, Ablett	Hardaker 1/2	15,384
9/4/16	10	Salford	14-10	Leeds Rhinos	AJ Bell Stadium	Galloway, Golding	Hardaker 1/3	4,912
15/4/16	11	Leeds Rhinos	20-18	Hull FC	Headingley Stadium	Keinhorst, Lilley, Jones-Buchanan	Lilley 4/5	15,888
22/4/16	12	St. Helens	28-34	Leeds Rhinos	Langtree Park	Golding, Burrow, Keinhorst (2), Handley, Mullally	Lilley 5/6	11,271
29/4/16	13	Huddersfield	28-20	Leeds Rhinos	John Smith's Stadium	Lilley, Walters, Burrow	Lilley 4/4	7,536
12/5/16	14	Leeds Rhinos	12-52	Castleford	Headingley Stadium	Garbutt, Handley	Lilley 2/2	17,213
21/5/16	15	Wigan	40-8	Leeds Rhinos	St James' Park	Watkins, Achurch	Lilley 0/2	39,331
27/5/16	16	Warrington	52-18	Leeds Rhinos	Halliwell Jones Stadium	Keinhost, Ferres (2)	Hardaker 3/3	10,317
3/6/16	17	Leeds Rhinos	12-24	Catalans Dragons	Headingley Stadium	Ferres, Walters	Lilley 2/2	14,016
10/6/16	18	Leeds Rhinos	8-0	Salford	Headingley Stadium	Briscoe	Sutcliffe 2/3	14,462
17/6/16	19	Wakefield Trinity	6-32	Leeds Rhinos	Belle Vue	Achurch, Singleton (2), Sutcliffe	Sutcliffe 8/8	7,161
3/7/16	20	Leeds Rhinos	22-23	Widnes	Headingley Stadium	Watkins, Hall, Moon, Garbutt	Sutcliffe 3/5	16,130
8/7/16	21	Hull FC	15-20	Leeds Rhinos	KC Stadium	Sutcliffe, Moon, Watkins (2)	Sutcliffe 2/5	10,618
15/7/16	22	Leeds Rhinos	18-16	Wigan	Headingley Stadium	Watkins, Cuthbertson, Ferres	Sutcliffe 3/4	16,712
21/7/16	23	Hull Kingston Rovers	20-24	Leeds Rhinos	Lightstream Stadium	Keinhorst, Burrow, Segeyaro, Hall	Sutcliffe 4/4	8,109

==== Qualifiers ====
===== Table =====
Pos	Team	Pld	W	D	L	PF	PA	PD	Pts	Qualification
1	Leeds Rhinos	7	6	0	1	239	94	+145	12	2017 Super League
2	Leigh Centurions (P)	7	6	0	1	223	193	+30	12	2017 Super League
3	Huddersfield Giants	7	5	0	2	257	166	+91	10	2017 Super League
4	Hull Kingston Rovers (R)	7	4	0	3	235	142	+93	8	Million Pound Game
5	Salford Red Devils	7	3	0	4	208	152	+56	6	Million Pound Game
6	London Broncos	7	3	0	4	221	212	+9	6	2017 Championship
7	Batley Bulldogs	7	1	0	6	111	318	−207	2	2017 Championship
8	Featherstone Rovers	7	0	0	7	96	313	−217	0	2017 Championship

Source: Rugby League Project
Rules for classification: 1) Points; 2) Points difference; 3) Number of points scored;
(P) Promoted; (R) Relegated

===== Results =====
Date	Rnd	Home	Score	Away	Venue	Tries	Goals	Att
6/816	24	Featherstone Rovers	6-62	Leeds Rhinos	Bigfellas Stadium	Watkins (4), Sutcliffe (2), Moon (2), Achurch, Ablett, Briscoe	Sutcliffe 9/15	6,671
12/8/16	25	Leeds Rhinos	22-18	Hull Kingston Rovers	Headingley Stadium	Watkins, Segeyaro (2)	Sutcliffe 5/6	14,180
20/8/16	26	London Broncos	28-42	Leeds Rhinos	Ealing Trailfinders Stadium	Briscoe (3), Sutcliffe, Segeyaro, Lilley, Achurch, Watkins	Sutcliffe 5/8	1,845
2/9/16	27	Leeds Rhinos	30-8	Salford	Headingley Stadium	Jones-Buchanan, Watkins, Segeyaro, Ablett, Cuthbertson	Lilley 4/7, Sutcliffe 1/1	13,996
9/9/16	28	Leeds Rhinos	32-0	Batley Bulldogs	Headingley Stadium	Briscoe, Watkins (2), Hall (2), Burrow	Lilley 4/7	15,135
18/9/16	29	Huddersfield	22-14	Leeds Rhinos	John Smith's Stadium	Cuthbertson, Briscoe, Handley	Sutcliffe 1/3	6,666
22/9/16	30	Leeds Rhinos	37-12	Leigh Centurions	Headingley Stadium	Ferres, Keinhorst (2), Segeyaro, Golding, Moon, Briscoe	Watkins 4/8	14,747

=== Challenge Cup ===
Date	Rnd	Home	Score	Away	Venue	Tries	Goals	Att
0/0/16	6th	Huddersfield	36-22	Leeds Rhinos	John Smith's Stadium	Keinhorst (2), Sutcliffe, Mullally	Lilley 3/6	4,979

=== World Club Challenge ===
Date	Home	Score	Away	Venue	Tries	Goals	Att
21/2/16	Leeds Rhinos	4-38	North Queensland Cowboys	Headingley Stadium	Burrow	Lilley 0/1	19,778

2016 World Club Series Teams
Leeds Rhinos	Positions	North Queensland Cowboys
1. Zak Hardaker	Fullback	1. Lachlan Coote
22. Ash Handley	Winger	2. Kyle Feldt
3. Kallum Watkins	Centre	3. Justin O'Neill
4. Joel Moon	Centre	4. Kane Linnett
5. Ryan Hall	Winger	5. Antonio Winterstein
14. Liam Sutcliffe	Stand off	6. Michael Morgan
25. Jordan Lilley	Scrum half	7. Johnathan Thurston (c)
8. Keith Galloway	Prop	9. Matthew Scott
7. Rob Burrow (c)	Hooker	9. Jake Granville
10. Adam Cuthbertson	Prop	10. James Tamou
15. Brett Delaney	Second row	11. Gavin Cooper
26. Brett Ferres	Second row	12. Ethan Lowe
16. Brad Singleton	Loose forward	13. Jason Taumalolo
17. Mitch Garbutt	Interchange	14. Rory Kostjasyn
18. Jimmy Keinhorst	Interchange	15. John Asiata
20. Anthony Mullally	Interchange	16. Scott Bolton
21. Josh Walters	Interchange	17. Ben Hannant
Brian McDermott	Coach	Paul Green
