= 2020 Challenge Cup final =

Rugby league match in the United Kingdom

2020 Challenge Cup Final
Leeds Rhinos	Salford Red Devils
17	16
	1	2	Total
LEE	12	5	17
SAL	6	10	16
- Date: 17 October 2020
- Stadium: Wembley Stadium, London
- Location: London, United Kingdom
- Lance Todd Trophy: Richie Myler
- God Save The Queen and Abide with Me: Lizzie Jones
- Referee: Liam Moore
- Attendance: 0 (Note: Behind closed doors due to the COVID-19 pandemic in the United Kingdom)

Broadcast partners
- Broadcasters: BBC One

The 2020 Challenge Cup Final was the 119th final of the Rugby Football League's Challenge Cup knock-out competition. The culmination of the 2020 Challenge Cup was originally scheduled for 22 August, but was postponed due to safety concerns regarding the COVID-19 pandemic along with most of the latter stages of competition. The final was rescheduled to be played on 17 October 2020 with kick-off at 15:00 (BST). The final was contested by the winners of the tournament semi-finals, Leeds Rhinos playing the Salford Red Devils (who were appearing in their first cup final since 1969).

Since the 1928–29 season, Challenge Cup finals have been played at Wembley Stadium, London (except the 1932 season and the Second World War period), but due to the COVID-19 pandemic there was discussion about moving the 2020 final away from Wembley. It was not until 22 September that the Rugby Football League (RFL) confirmed that the game would still be played at Wembley Stadium.

New COVID-19 restrictions announced in September forced the RFL to announce on 28 September, that the game would be played behind closed doors for the first time in the history of the competition. Following the semi-finals fans raised a petition calling on the government to allow season ticket holders of the two clubs to attend the game in person, on the basis that the number of spectators this would allow could easily maintain social-distancing inside the 90,000 seat venue. The RFL issued a statement saying that they continued to lobby the government to allow spectators in.

== Background ==
Leeds Rhinos are the tournament's second most successful side, winning 13 Challenge Cup trophies. The 2020 final would be their ninth cup final of the Super League era, which included their last victory in the competition during their treble winning season of 2015. By contrast, Salford Red Devils had only won the competition once, in 1938. It would be Salford's first final since 1969 when they lost 6–11 to Castleford in the 1969 final. The match would also be the first time these two clubs had met in the final of the Challenge Cup.

== Route to the final ==
=== Leeds Rhinos ===
Leeds Rhinos were due to face Hull KR in their opening sixth round tie in the Challenge Cup. The match, originally scheduled for early April, was postponed due to the COVID-19 pandemic and rescheduled for late August. However, due to Championship, League 1 clubs and Toronto Wolfpack withdrawing from the competition, the restructuring of the competition gave several teams, including Leeds, a bye to the quarter finals. The quarter final draw saw the Rhinos drawn against Hull Kingston Rovers (their originally scheduled opponents for the sixth round). Leeds won the game comfortably 48–18. The win against the Rovers saw the two most successful teams in the history of the Challenge Cup drawn against each other as Leeds (the second most successful side) played Wigan Warriors (the most successful team). Leeds dominated the first half of the game and, despite the Warriors attempted comeback in the second half, the Rhinos progressed with a comfortable 26–12 victory.

Round	Opposition	Score
Quarter-final	Hull KR	48–18
Semi-final	Wigan Warriors	26–12

=== Salford Red Devils ===
Salford Red Devils's sixth round opener was due to be against the previous season's champions St Helens, to whom they were runners-up in the Grand Final. However, like all Round 6 ties, it was postponed and eventually cancelled due to the COVID-19 pandemic. Salford was another of the teams to receive a bye to the quarter finals where they were drawn against French side Catalans Dragons. The game, after an 18-all draw at full time, saw a try from Dan Sarginson give the Red Devils victory. A semi-final against Warrington Wolves was the final step before Wembley. After trailing 8–14 at half time, Salford came out victorious with a 24–22 win over Warrington.

Round	Opposition	Score
Quarter-final	Catalans Dragons	22–18 (Note: After golden point extra time)
Semi-final	Warrington Wolves	24–22

== Pre-match ==
British classical singer Lizzie Jones sung The National Anthem at Wembley before the game. Instead of singing "Abide with Me" at Wembley, she recorded a special version of the hymn above Castle Hill in Huddersfield, the birthplace of Rugby League, to celebrate 125 years of the sport. This would be Jones's second Challenge Cup Final appearance after previously performing at the 2015 Final.

Former Leeds Rhinos scrum-half Rob Burrow was given the honour of Chief Guest of the final. Whilst choosing to be absent from Wembley due to the COVID-19 pandemic, Burrow was awarded the honour following his diagnosis of motor neuron disease in December 2019, in recognition of his charity work and fundraising for research into a cure, in addition to a 16-year career with the Rhinos from 2001 to 2017, ending in the 2017 Super League Grand Final, winning his eighth Grand Final with Leeds. The BBC aired a documentary Rob Burrow: My Year with MND the Tuesday night before the final on BBC Two. The programme documented Burrow's personal and family struggle with the disease and the charity work he and his family underwent to raise awareness of the diseases and money for its cure. The documentary was aired again on BBC One prior to their coverage of the final.

== Match details ==
Saturday, 17 October
3:00pm (BST)

Leeds Rhinos	17–16	Salford Red Devils
Tries: Briscoe (12'); Handley (31', 64'); Goals: Martin (13', 32') 2/3; Drop goals: Gale (76')	report	Tries: Williams (19'); Pauli (53'); Greenwood (59'); Goals: Inu (20', 60') 2/3

Wembley Stadium, London
Attendance: 0
Referee: (England) Liam Moore
Lance Todd Trophy: Richie Myler

=== Teams ===
Leeds Rhinos	Position	Salford Red Devils
#16 Richie Myler	Fullback	#1 Niall Evalds
#2 Tom Briscoe	Wing	#22 Rhys Williams
#4 Konrad Hurrell	Centre	#32 Kallum Watkins
#15 Liam Sutcliffe	Centre	#3 Kris Welham
#5 Ash Handley	Wing	#5 Krisnan Inu
#6 Robert Lui	Stand-off	#6 Tui Lolohea
#7 Luke Gale	Scrum-half	#7 Kevin Brown
#8 Ava Seumanufagai	Prop	#8 Lee Mossop
#9 Kruise Leeming	Hooker	#9 Joey Lussick
#19 Mikolaj Oledzki	Prop	#10 Gil Dudson
#11 Alex Mellor	Second-row	#13 Tyrone McCarthy
#12 Rhyse Martin	Second-row	#21 James Greenwood
#10 Matt Prior	Loose forward	#19 Mark Flanagan
#14 Brad Dwyer	interchange	#14 Sebastine Ikahihifo
#26 Alex Sutcliffe	interchange	#12 Pauli Pauli
#25 James Donaldson	interchange	#17 Luke Yates
#17 Adam Cuthbertson	interchange	#16 Greg Burke
Richard Agar	Coach	Ian Watson

== Post match ==
The 2020 Final saw Leeds Rhinos lift their fourteenth cup title, their first in five years following their treble winning season in 2015. Tom Briscoe's 14th minute try saw him break the record for most tries scored in the Challenge Cup Final, with seven, after scoring once in 2014 and a further five times in 2015, both years seeing The Rhinos come out as winners.

After the final it was confirmed that over two million people had watch the Rob Burrow: My Year with MND documentary and over £50,000 had been raised for his charity - Motor Neurone Disease Association.

TV viewing of the final increased 50% from the previous year with over six million watching the competition, making it the most viewed final since 2012.
