= 2015 Challenge Cup final =

Rugby league match in the United Kingdom

2015 Challenge Cup Final
Hull KR	Leeds Rhinos
0	50
	1	2	Total
HKR	0	0	0
LEE	16	34	50
- Date: 29 August 2015
- Stadium: Wembley Stadium, London
- Location: London, United Kingdom
- Harry Sunderland Trophy: Tom Briscoe
- God Save The Queen and Abide with Me: Lizzie Jones
- Referee: Ben Thaler
- Attendance: 80,140

Broadcast partners
- Broadcasters: BBC One

The 2015 Challenge Cup Final was the 114th cup-deciding game of the rugby league 2015 Challenge Cup Season. It was held at Wembley Stadium in London on 29 August 2015, kick off 15:15. The final was contested by Hull KR and the Leeds Rhinos. The game saw Leeds Rhinos beat Hull KR by 50 points to nil in what remains the biggest victory in Challenge Cup Final history.

== Background ==
The 2015 Final was Hull KR's first final of the Super League era having last reached the final during the 1985–86 competition. In contrast, this was Leeds Rhinos's fifth final in the last six years having beat Castleford Tigers in the previous year's final and achieving runners up positions in the 2010, 2011, and 2012 editions of the competition. In terms of the domestic league Hull KR were relegation threatened having entered the qualifiers whereas Leeds Rhinos would be the eventual champions, both in terms of the Grand Final and the League Leaders.

== Route to the final ==
=== Hull KR ===
As a team that did not quality for the 2014 Super League Super 8's, Hull KR entered the competition in the fifth round which saw them draw Championship leaders Bradford Bulls. A 50–30 victory saw them play eventual Super League runners-up Wigan Warriors, beating them 16 points to 12. The quarter finals and semi-finals saw KR play midtable teams Catalans Dragons and Warrington Wolves, beating them by six and eight points respectively.

Round	Opposition	Score
5th	Bradford Bulls (A)	50–30
6th	Wigan Warriors (A)	16–12
QF	Catalans Dragons (H)	32–26
SF	Warrington Wolves (N)	26–18

=== Leeds Rhinos ===
Entering at the sixth round, Leeds drew Super League title rivals Huddersfield Giants over whom they scored a comfortable victory by 32 points. The quarter finals saw them beat Hull F.C. 24 points to six, before facing another title rival, St Helens, in the semi-finals, beating them 24 points to 14.

Round	Opposition	Score
6th	Huddersfield Giants (H)	48–16
QF	Hull F.C. (A)	24–6
SF	St Helens (N)	24–14

== Pre-match ==
The 2014 Britain's Got Talent winners Collabro provided musical entertainment prior to the match. The pre-match also saw a tribute to Danny Jones who died of a cardiac disease earlier in the season whist playing for Keighley Cougars. His widow, singer Lizzie Jones, would sing Abide with Me before the game.

== Match details ==
Saturday, 29 August
15:15

Hull KR	0 - 50	Leeds Rhinos
	Report	Tries; Brett Delaney ('7); Danny McGuire ('17); Tom Briscoe ('20, '47, '66, '75, '79); Brad Singleton ('58); Rob Burrow ('73); Goals; Kevin Sinfield ('7, '17, '47, '58, '73, '75, '79)

Wembley Stadium, London
Attendance: 80,140
Referee: (England) Ben Thaler
Player of the Match: (England) Tom Briscoe

Hull KR	Posit.		Leeds Rhinos
1 Kieran Dixon	.	.	1 Zak Hardaker
4 Josh Mantellato	.	.	2 Tom Briscoe
19 Kris Welham	.	.	3 Kallum Watkins
18 Liam Salter	.	.	4 Joel Moon
5 Ken Sio	.	.	5 Ryan Hall
6 Maurice Blair	.	.	13 Kevin Sinfield (c)
7 Albert Kelly	.	.	6 Danny McGuire
8 Adam Walker	.	.	30 Mitch Garbutt
31 Shaun Lunt	.	.	17 Adam Cuthbertson
34 Tony Puletua	.	.	10 Jamie Peacock
11 Kevin Larroyer	.	.	14 Stevie Ward
12 Graeme Horne	.	.	12 Carl Ablett
13 Tyrone McCarthy	.	.	15 Brett Delaney
24 John Boudebza	Int.		7 Rob Burrow
15 James Donaldson	Int.		8 Kylie Leuluai
32 Dane Tilse	Int.		16 Mitch Achurch
14 Mitchell Allgood	Int.		19 Brad Singleton
Chris Chester	Coach		Brian McDermott

== Post match ==
Leeds Rhinos beat their own record of the largest win margin during a Challenge Cup Final. They previous set the record during the 1999 Challenge Cup Final where they beat London Broncos 52 points to 16.

This Challenge Cup victory would form part of Leeds Rhinos's treble winning season, becoming only the sixth team in British Rugby to achieve this feat. The treble season would mark club captain Kevin Sinfield's retirement from the sport after first captaining the club to win the remaining two trophies of the treble.
