= Josh Walters =

English rugby footballer (born 1994)

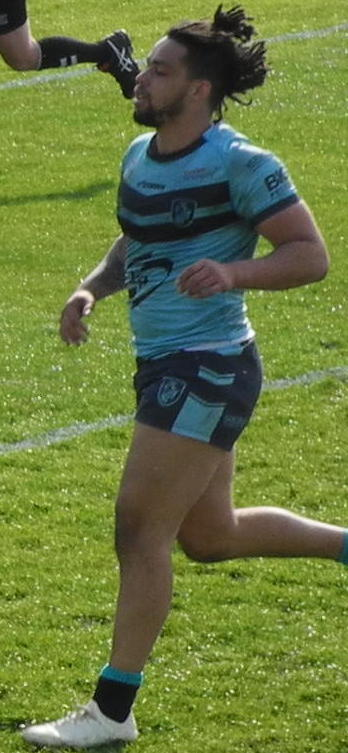

Personal information
- Full name: Joshua Walters
- Born: 23 December 1994 (age 30) Guildford, Surrey, England
- Height: 6 ft 2 in (1.88 m)
- Weight: 14 st 13 lb (95 kg)

Playing information

Rugby league
- Position: Second-row, Loose forward
Club
Years	Team	Pld	T	G	FG	P
2013–18	Leeds Rhinos	61	9	0	0	36
2015(DR)	→ Hunslet Hawks	7	0	0	0	0
2016(DR)	→ Featherstone Rovers	6	3	0	0	12
2017(DR)	→ Featherstone Rovers	11	0	0	0	0
2018(DR)	→ Featherstone Rovers	2	3	0	0	12
2019	Featherstone Rovers	26	9	0	0	36
2020–21	London Broncos	16	7	0	0	28
	Total	129	31	0	0	124

Rugby union
- Position: Wing, Inside-Centre
Club
Years	Team	Pld	T	G	FG	P
2021–22	Richmond F.C.
- Source: As of 21 January 2024

Josh Walters (born 23 December 1994) is an English rugby union, formerly rugby league, footballer who plays as a Wing or Inside-Centre for Richmond F.C. in the National League 1.

He played for the Leeds Rhinos in the Super League, and spent time on loan from Leeds at the Hunslet Hawks and Featherstone Rovers in the Championship. Walters also spent a season with Featherstone in the second tier.

== Background ==
Walters was born in Guildford, Surrey, England.

== Playing career ==
=== Leeds Rhinos ===
A former rugby union player, Walters converted to league and joined Leeds Rhinos in 2013, making his Super League début in 2014 against Huddersfield Giants. He went on to make 8 appearances that year, scoring three tries. He made a further 9 appearances in 2015 and was also dual registered with Hunslet Hawks.

Walters played from the bench in the 2015 Super League Grand Final, and scored the match-winning try in what was his first play-off appearance.

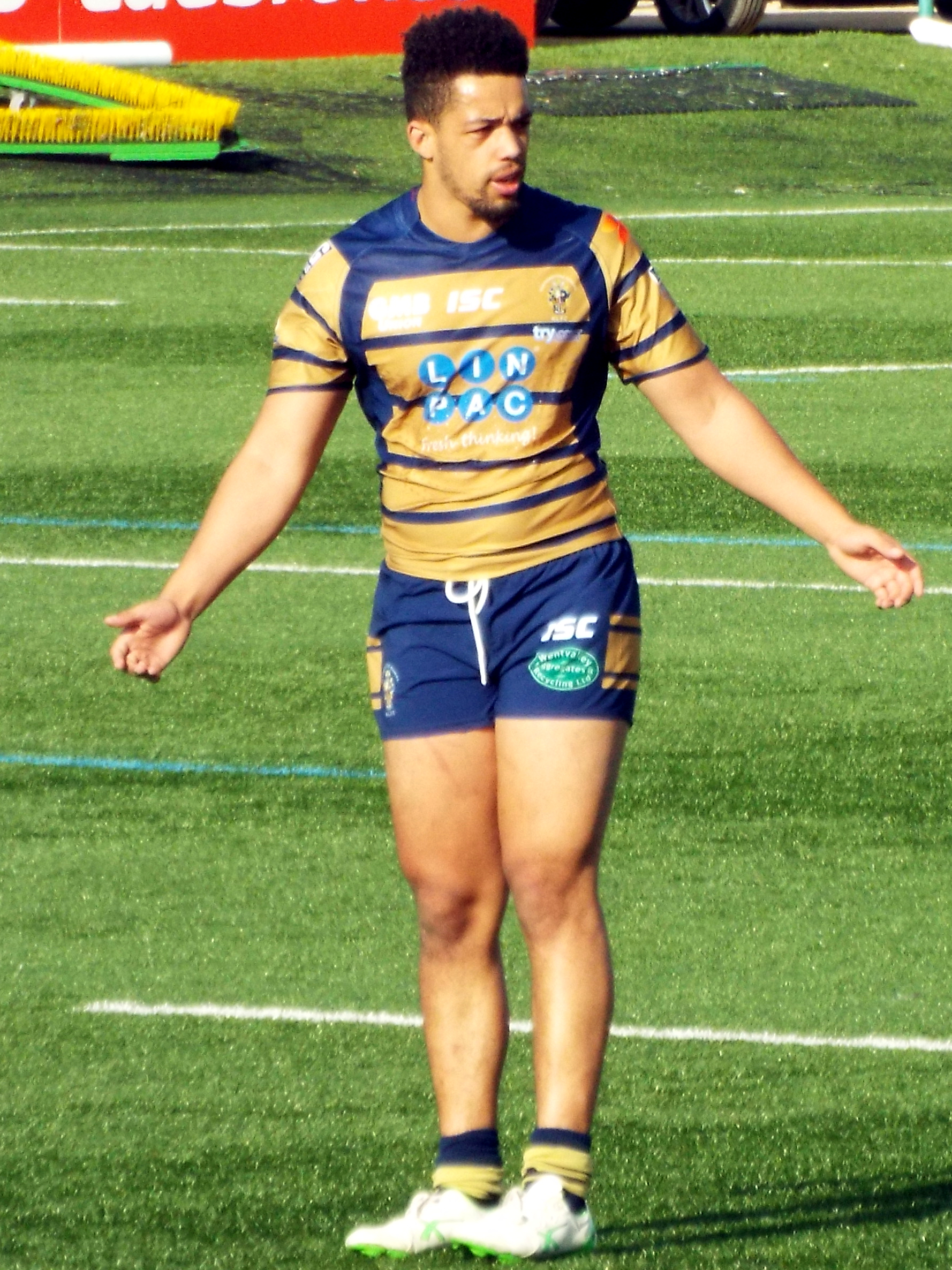
Walters playing for Featherstone on loan in 2016

=== Featherstone Rovers ===
Walters joined Featherstone ahead of the 2019 Championship season.

=== London Broncos ===
He moved to the capital following the Broncos relegation at the conclusion of the 2019 Super League season.

=== West End Warriors ===
Made two appearances for the West End Warriors in 2025, scoring the winning try during golden point winning the grand final.

== Honours ==
Super League: 2015

League Leaders' Shield: 2015

Challenge Cup: 2015

SRL Mens Premiership: 2025

== Club statistics ==
Year	Club	Competition	Appearances	Tries	Goals	Drop goals	Points
2014	Leeds Rhinos	Super League	8	3	0	0	12
2015	Leeds Rhinos	Super League	12	2	0	0	8
2015	Hunslet Hawks	Championship	7	0	0	0	0
2016	Leeds Rhinos	Super League	13	2	0	0	8
2016	Featherstone Rovers	Championship	6	3	0	0	12
2017	Leeds Rhinos	Super League	9	0	0	0	0
2017	Featherstone Rovers	Championship	11	0	0	0	0
2018	Leeds Rhinos	Super League	19	2	0	0	8
2018	Featherstone Rovers	Championship	2	3	0	0	12
2019	Featherstone Rovers	Championship	26	9	0	0	36
2020	London Broncos	Championship	6	3	0	0	12
2021	London Broncos	Championship	10	4	0	0	16
Club career total			129	31	0	0	124
