= Brad Singleton =

Ireland semi-professional rugby league footballer

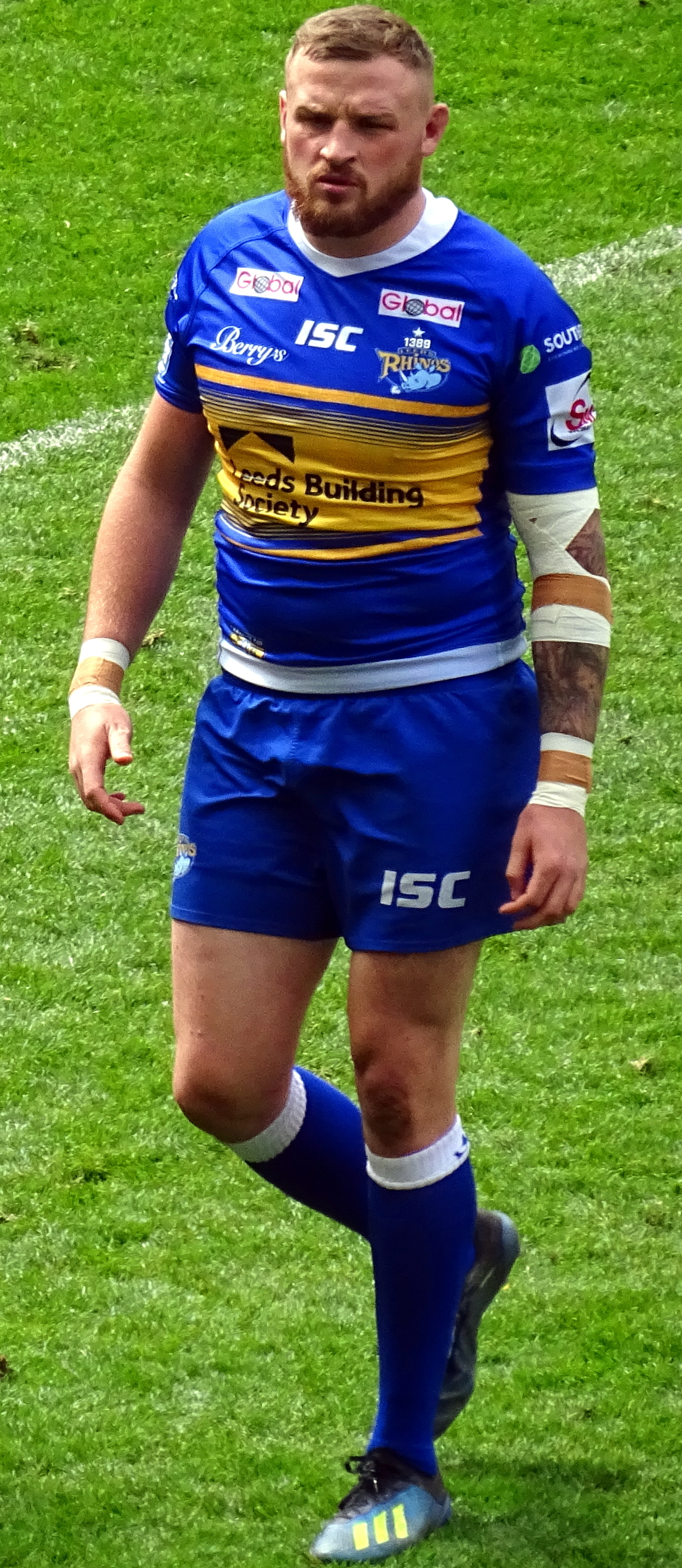

Personal information
- Full name: Bradley Zack Singleton
- Born: 29 October 1992 (age 34) Barrow-in-Furness, Cumbria, England
- Height: 6 ft 2 in (1.88 m)
- Weight: 17 st 0 lb (108 kg)

Playing information
- Position: Prop, Loose forward
Club
Years	Team	Pld	T	G	FG	P
2011–19	Leeds Rhinos	178	20	0	0	80
2012(loan)	→ Dewsbury Rams	12	1	0	0	4
2013(loan)	→ Wakefield Trinity Wildcats	1	0	0	0	0
2013(DR)	→ Hunslet Hawks	8	1	0	0	4
2019(DR)	→ Featherstone Rovers	1	1	0	0	4
2020	Toronto Wolfpack	4	1	0	0	4
2020–23	Wigan Warriors	66	5	0	0	20
2023–25	Salford Red Devils	31	1	0	0	4
2025–26	Castleford Tigers	22	0	0	0	0
2026	Barrow Raiders	7	1	0	0	4
	Total	330	31	0	0	124
Representative
Years	Team	Pld	T	G	FG	P
2017	Ireland	3	0	0	0	0
2011–22	Cumbria	2	1	0	0	4

Coaching information
Club
Years	Team	Gms	W	D	L	W%
2027–	Workington Town	0	0	0	0
- Source: As of 3 November 2026

Bradley Singleton (born 29 October 1992) is a professional rugby league coach who is the head coach of Workington Town in the RFL Championship.

He is a former Ireland international rugby league footballer who played as a prop or loose forward, most recently for semi-professional side Barrow Raiders in the RFL Championship.

He has previously played for Leeds Rhinos, Toronto Wolfpack, Wigan Warriors and Salford Red Devils in the Super League. He has spent time on loan or dual registration at Dewsbury Rams, Hunslet Hawks and Featherstone Rovers in the Championship, and at Wakefield Trinity Wildcats in the Super League.

== Background ==
Singleton was born in Barrow-in-Furness, Cumbria, England. Singleton played junior rugby for Barrow Island ARLFC and a former pupil of Alfred Barrow School.

== Club career ==
=== Leeds Rhinos ===
Singleton made his début in 2011's Super League XVI, coming off the bench in a 46–12 win over Salford. He spent time on loan at Dewsbury Rams in 2012 and Wakefield Trinity in 2013, before being sent to Hunslet on a dual registration.

In 2015 he was awarded the number 16 shirt and was part of Leeds' treble-winning team, and played in the Challenge Cup final victory over Hull KR at Wembley Stadium. In September he played in the 16–20 win over Huddersfield Giants that secured the League Leaders' Shield in the final minute of the regular season, and the Grand Final victory over the Wigan Warriors at Old Trafford.

In 2017, he played in a second successful Grand Final, a 24–6 win over the Castleford Tigers at Old Trafford.

In 2019, Singleton played in a 42–14 win for RFL Championship club Featherstone Rovers over Batley Bulldogs on a dual-registration loan.

=== Toronto Wolfpack ===
At the end of the 2019 Super League season, Singleton signed a three-year deal with newly-promoted Toronto Wolfpack. He made four appearances for the Wolfpack before picking up a knee injury, with the club ultimately withdrawing from the 2020 season due to the COVID-19 pandemic.

=== Wigan Warriors ===
On 17 September 2020, Singleton signed ahead of the season's transfer deadline for Wigan Warriors. In November, he started in the 19–6 win over Huddersfield Giants that secured the League Leaders' Shield, and played in his third Grand Final, a 4–8 loss against St Helens.

In round 17 of the 2021 Super League season, Singleton was sent off for fighting in Wigan's 50–6 victory over Leigh.

In May 2022, Singleton started for Wigan in the Challenge Cup final, a 16–14 win over Huddersfield, in what was his second and the club's twentieth Challenge Cup trophy. In round 18 of the 2022 Super League season, Singleton was sent off in Wigan's 20–18 loss against St Helens at Magic Weekend for a dangerous high tackle.

=== Salford Red Devils ===
On 26 July 2023, Singleton signed for Salford as part of a swap deal with Tyler Dupree effective immediately.

=== Castleford Tigers ===
On 19 March 2025, Single signed for Castleford Tigers until the end of the 2026 season, with Salford receiving an undisclosed fee. Singleton played 21 matches for Castleford in the 2025 Super League season as the club finished 11th on the table.

On 26 May 2026, Singleton was granted a release from Castleford with immediate effect.

=== Barrow Raiders ===
On 18 June 2026 it was reported that he had signed for Barrow Raiders in the RFL Championship

== Representative career ==
Singleton has representative honours at youth level, representing England in the under-15 and under-16 age groups. He also captained England Academy against the French Schoolboys in a three-test series in 2011.

In October 2013, Singleton made his sole appearance for England Knights at Salford ahead of the 2013 Rugby League World Cup versus Samoa. Singleton started on the bench and picked up a yellow card and one-match ban after fighting with Mose Masoe.

Singleton was named in Ireland's 2017 World Cup squad and started all three of Ireland's group games, including wins against Italy and Wales, and a loss to Papua New Guinea in Port Moresby.

In 2022, Singleton again took part in a World Cup warm-up match, starting for Cumbria in a 28–12 victory over Jamaica at Workington. In October 2023, he would again play for Cumbria as they defeated a Wales Rugby League Chairman's XIII 23–4 in a testimonial match for Kyle Amor at Whitehaven. In September 2025, he was named in Cumbria's 30-man squad to face Nigeria at Barrow in November.

== Coaching ==
=== Workington Town ===
On 28 July 2026 it was reported that he will take the role of head-coach for Workington Town in the RFL Championship from the start of the 2027 season, once current boss Jonty Gorley takes over the Director of Rugby role.

== Club statistics ==
Appearances and points in all competitions by year
Club	Season	Tier	App	T	G	DG	Pts
Leeds Rhinos	2011	Super League	1	0	0	0	0
Leeds Rhinos	2012	Super League	1	0	0	0	0
Leeds Rhinos	2013	Super League	15	0	0	0	0
Leeds Rhinos	2014	Super League	24	2	0	0	8
Leeds Rhinos	2015	Super League	34	9	0	0	36
Leeds Rhinos	2016	Super League	26	3	0	0	12
Leeds Rhinos	2017	Super League	28	3	0	0	12
Leeds Rhinos	2018	Super League	25	1	0	0	4
Leeds Rhinos	2019	Super League	24	2	0	0	8
Leeds Rhinos	Total		178	20	0	0	80
→ Dewsbury Rams (loan)	2012	Championship	12	1	0	0	4
→ Wakefield Trinity Wildcats (loan)	2013	Super League	1	0	0	0	0
→ Hunslet Hawks (DR)	2013	Championship	8	1	0	0	4
→ Featherstone Rovers (DR)	2019	Championship	1	1	0	0	4
Toronto Wolfpack	2020	Super League	4	1	0	0	4
Wigan Warriors	2020	Super League	6	0	0	0	0
Wigan Warriors	2021	Super League	22	3	0	0	12
Wigan Warriors	2022	Super League	25	2	0	0	8
Wigan Warriors	2023	Super League	12	0	0	0	0
Wigan Warriors	Total		65	5	0	0	20
Salford Red Devils	2023	Super League	6	0	0	0	0
Salford Red Devils	2024	Super League	22	1	0	0	4
Salford Red Devils	2025	Super League	3	0	0	0	0
Salford Red Devils	Total		31	1	0	0	4
Castleford Tigers	2025	Super League	21	0	0	0	0
Castleford Tigers	2026	Super League	0	0	0	0	0
Castleford Tigers	Total		21	0	0	0	0
Barrow Raiders	2026	Championship	0	0	0	0	0
Career total			321	30	0	0	120

As of match played 19 September 2025

== Honours ==
=== Club ===
- Super League (2): 2015, 2017
- League Leaders' Shield (2): 2015, 2020
- Challenge Cup (2): 2015, 2022
