= Kallum Watkins =

England international rugby league footballer

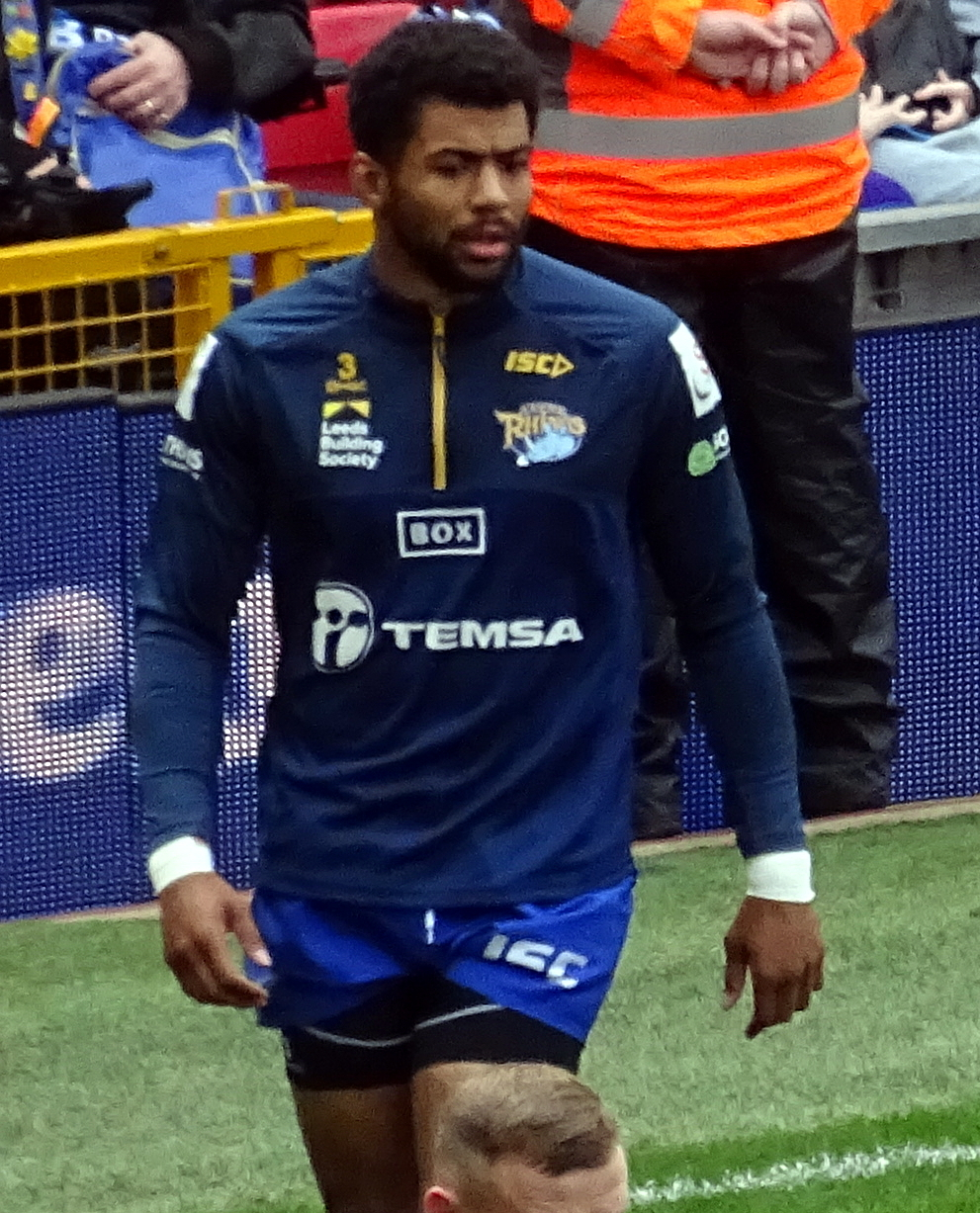

Personal information
- Full name: Kallum Paul Watkins
- Born: 12 March 1991 (age 35) Salford, Greater Manchester, England
- Height: 6 ft 2 in (1.88 m)
- Weight: 15 st 10 lb (100 kg)

Playing information
- Position: Centre, Second-row
Club
Years	Team	Pld	T	G	FG	P
2007–19	Leeds Rhinos	259	132	101	0	730
2019–20	Gold Coast Titans	8	0	0	0	0
2020–25	Salford Red Devils	96	28	0	0	112
2025–	Leeds Rhinos	50	8	5	0	42
	Total	413	168	106	0	884
Representative
Years	Team	Pld	T	G	FG	P
2012–	England	32	15	0	0	60
- Source: As of 30 October 2026

Kallum Paul Watkins (born 12 March 1991) is an English professional rugby league footballer who plays as a centre or second-row forward for the Leeds Rhinos in the Super League and England at international level.

He previously played for the Leeds Rhinos in the Super League and the Gold Coast Titans in the NRL. Watkins was contracted to the Toronto Wolfpack in the Super League, but did not play for them. Watkins joined Salford Red Devils in 2020, and returned to Leeds Rhinos in 2025.

== Early life ==
Watkins was born in Manchester, England to a Jamaican mother and a British father. Watkins began his rugby league career at local clubs Langworthy Reds and Folly Lane, before moving on to Latchford Albion of Warrington. In 2007, after impressing in a trial at Leeds he signed a junior contract with the club.

Watkins has earned representative honours for the England Under 17s team against the Australian Institute of Sport (AIS).

== Club career ==
=== Leeds ===
Kallum joined Leeds in 2007, having impressed during a trial period. In that first season with the Junior Academy he scored 13 tries in 20 appearances as they headed for Grand Final glory, where he scored the opening try in Leeds 26–16 win over St. Helens, and earned himself a place in the England U17 squad to play the AIS. His England U17s début was as a substitute in the first test against the Australian Institute of Sport at Warrington's Halliwell Jones Stadium. England lost 28–26, but Kallum helped the young Lions restore pride a week later with a 38–22 win at Wakefield Trinity Wildcats' Belle Vue.

He began 2008 in spectacular form for the Academy, scoring 11 tries in the opening five games of the season, including a hattrick against Hull Kingston Rovers in the first game of the season & four tries a week later against Castleford. His form saw him promoted to the Leeds first Grade squad in April 2008 at just sixteen years of age. He made his début against the then Celtic Crusaders in the Challenge Cup, scoring a try. He went on to make 4 further appearances in 2008 scoring 2 further tries, most notably against Bradford Bulls at the Millennium Magic weekend.

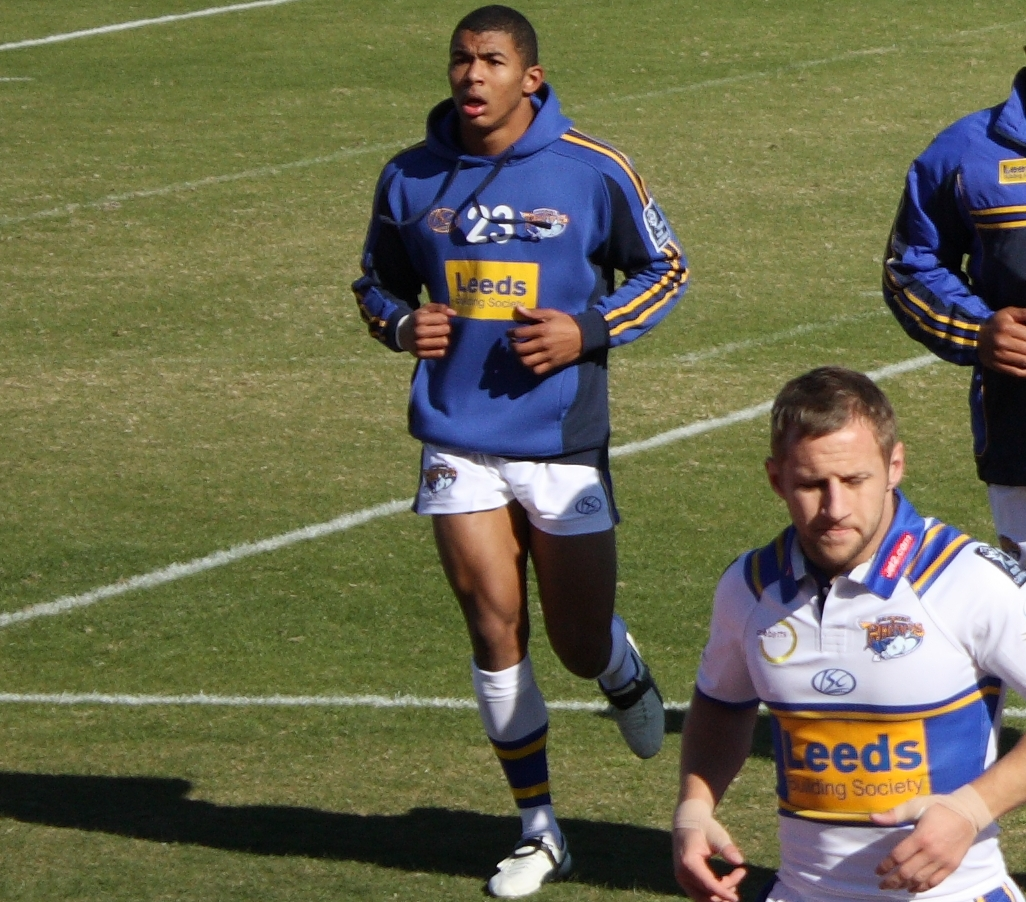
Watkins warming for the Leeds Rhinos in Florida in 2009

In 2009, Watkins became a more regular name on the Leeds team sheet. He made 13 appearances in all scoring 4 tries, including a spectacular length of the field interception try late on to beat Huddersfield at Headingley 20–12.

2010 started with so much promise for the 18-year-old Watkins, starting in the Leeds first 6 games which included an appearance on the wing in the World Club Challenge defeat by the Melbourne Storm. Watkins started at fullback, wing, and centre in the 6 game stretch due to injuries to teammates, however, on 14 March he injured his knee in the 26–20 defeat by Huddersfield, and had to have a knee reconstruction. Watkins did not play again that season.

At the start of the 2011 season he was mainly used on the wing scoring 9 tries in 8 games including 4 against Wakefield Trinity. On 29 April 2011, while playing against Castleford in Leeds' 48–6 win, Watkins injured the ligaments in his wrist which saw him miss the next 12 weeks.

Later that year he played at centre for Leeds in the 2011 Challenge Cup Final defeat by the Wigan Warriors at Wembley Stadium.

Watkins was given a boost after 2 injury-ravaged seasons when he was handed the Number 3 Jersey by the Leeds Head Coach Brian McDermott. This signalled the intent that the coach sees him as the long term right centre at Leeds. Kallum also signed a new 5-year contract on 26 January, keeping him at Leeds until 2017 at the earliest

He played in the 2012 Challenge Cup Final defeat by the Warrington Wolves at Wembley Stadium.

He played in the 2012 Super League Grand Final victory over the Warrington Wolves at Old Trafford.

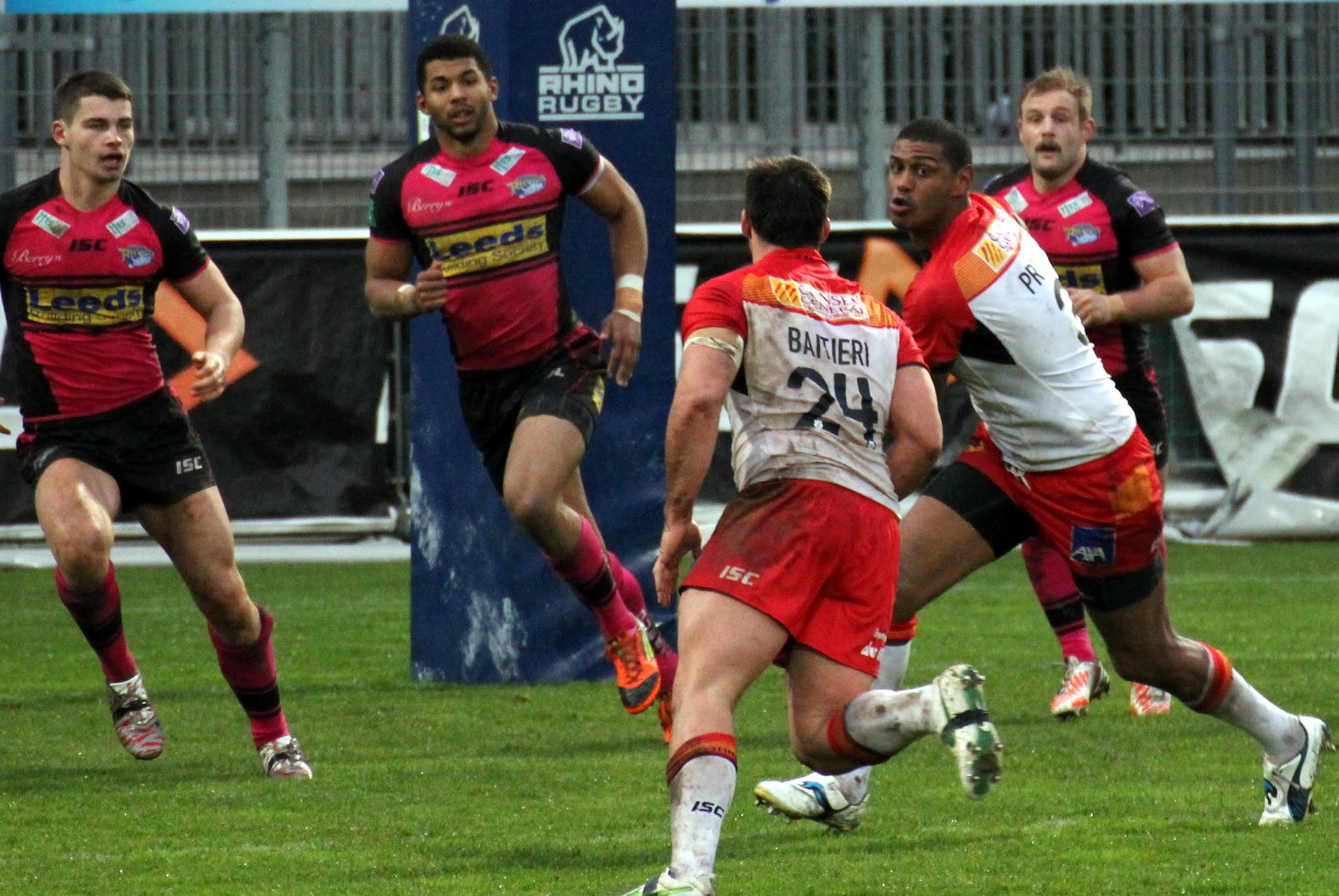
Watkins playing for the Leeds Rhinos against the Catalans Dragons in 2013

He played in the 2014 Challenge Cup Final victory over the Castleford Tigers at Wembley Stadium.

He played in the 2015 Challenge Cup Final victory over Hull Kingston Rovers at Wembley Stadium.

He played in the 2015 Super League Grand Final victory over the Wigan Warriors at Old Trafford.

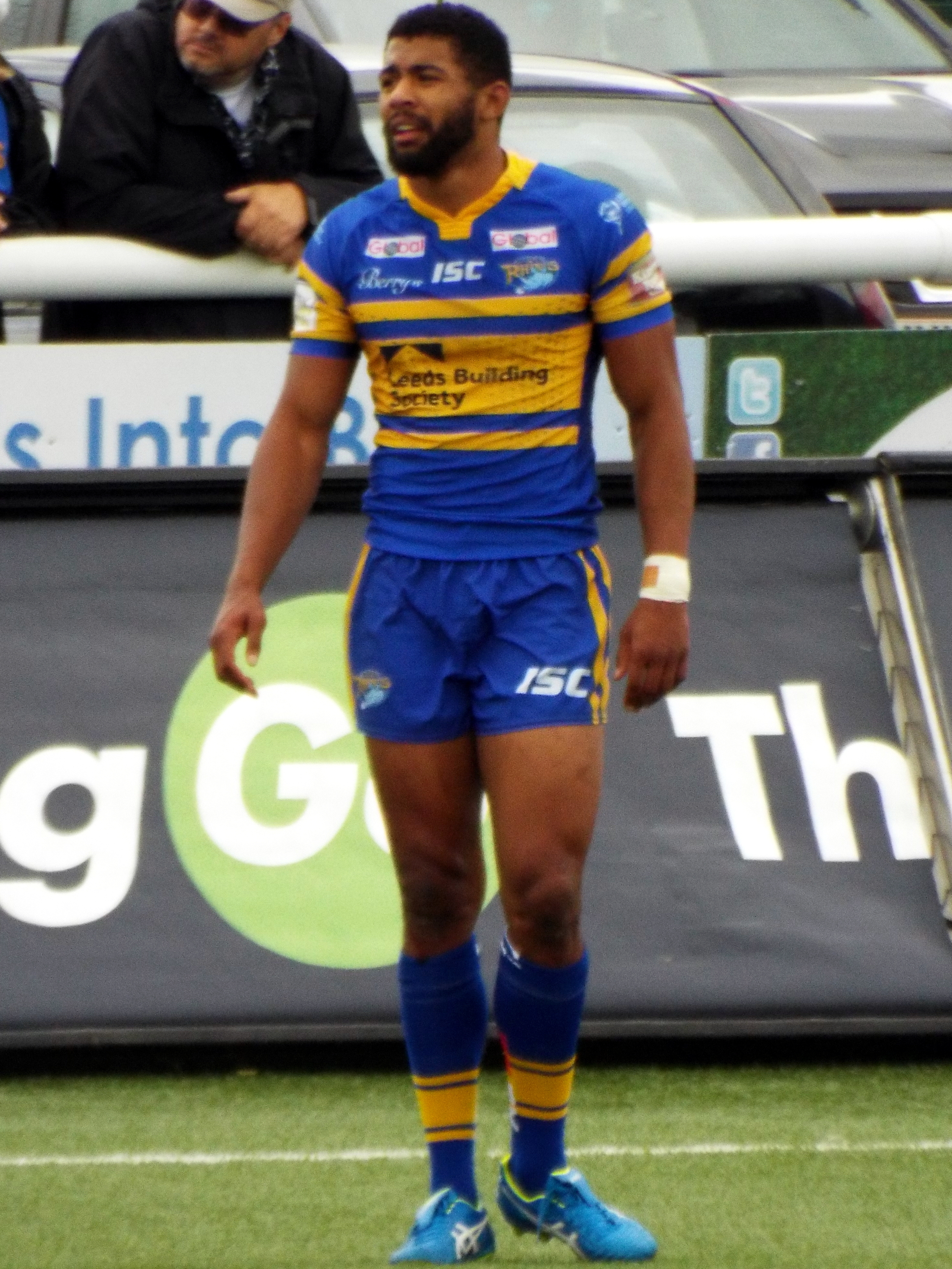
Watkins playing for the Leeds Rhinos in 2016

Watkins played in Leeds' 24–6 2017 Super League Grand Final victory over Castleford at Old Trafford. It was his sixth premiership victory as a player with Leeds.

In January 2018, Watkins was named by Leeds as their captain for the 2018 season.

=== Gold Coast ===
In 2019, Watkins signed a contract to join NRL side the Gold Coast Titans. Watkins made his debut for the Gold Coast against Brisbane in Round 19 of the 2019 NRL season which ended in a 34–12 loss at Cbus Super Stadium. Watkins had two assists in the match. The following week, Watkins played for the Gold Coast against the Sydney Roosters as the club suffered its second-worst defeat since entering the competition losing 58–6 at the Sydney Cricket Ground.

Watkins made a total of 6 appearances in his first season in the NRL as the Gold Coast finished last on the table and claimed the wooden spoon.

In April 2020, it was announced that Watkins had quit the NRL to fly home back to England to be with his sick father.

=== Toronto ===
On 22 May 2020, it was announced that Watkins had signed a three-year deal with the Toronto Wolfpack in the Super League. before the deal was voided as a result of Toronto being expelled from Super League due to financial problems and complications arising from the COVID-19 pandemic. He would end up joining Salford Red Devils.

=== Salford ===
On 17 October 2020, Watkins played in the 2020 Challenge Cup Final defeat for Salford against Leeds at Wembley Stadium.

In round 21 of the 2022 Betfred Super League season, Watkins scored two tries for Salford in a 44-12 upset victory over St Helens RFC. In round 24 of the 2022 season, Watkins scored two tries for Salford in an upset victory over Catalans at the Stade Gilbert Brutus. In the 2023 Super League season, Sio played 23 matches for Salford and as the club finished 7th on the table and missed the playoffs.

=== Leeds Rhinos return ===
On 9 April 2025 it was reported that he had returned to Leeds Rhinos on a deal until the end of the 2025 season Watkins played 21 games for Leeds in the 2025 Super League season including their elimination playoff loss against St Helens.

== International career ==
Watkins made his International début for England in the 2012 Autumn International Series. He scored a try on début against Wales. He went on to score a total try tally of 4 tries in England's 3 tournament matches.

In October and November, Watkins played for England in their 2013 Rugby League World Cup campaign. He played in all 5 of England's matches, scoring two tries.

In October, England travelled down under to play in the Four Nations. Kallum scored two tries in England's 3 tournament matches.

In October Watkins was named in England's 24-man squad for their test-series against New Zealand. Before the series began England took on France in a test match at Leigh. Kallum scored his 9th career try in England's rout of their opponents.

In October, Watkins was named in England's 24-man squad for the 2016 Four Nations. Before the tournament began, Kallum played in England's test match against France.

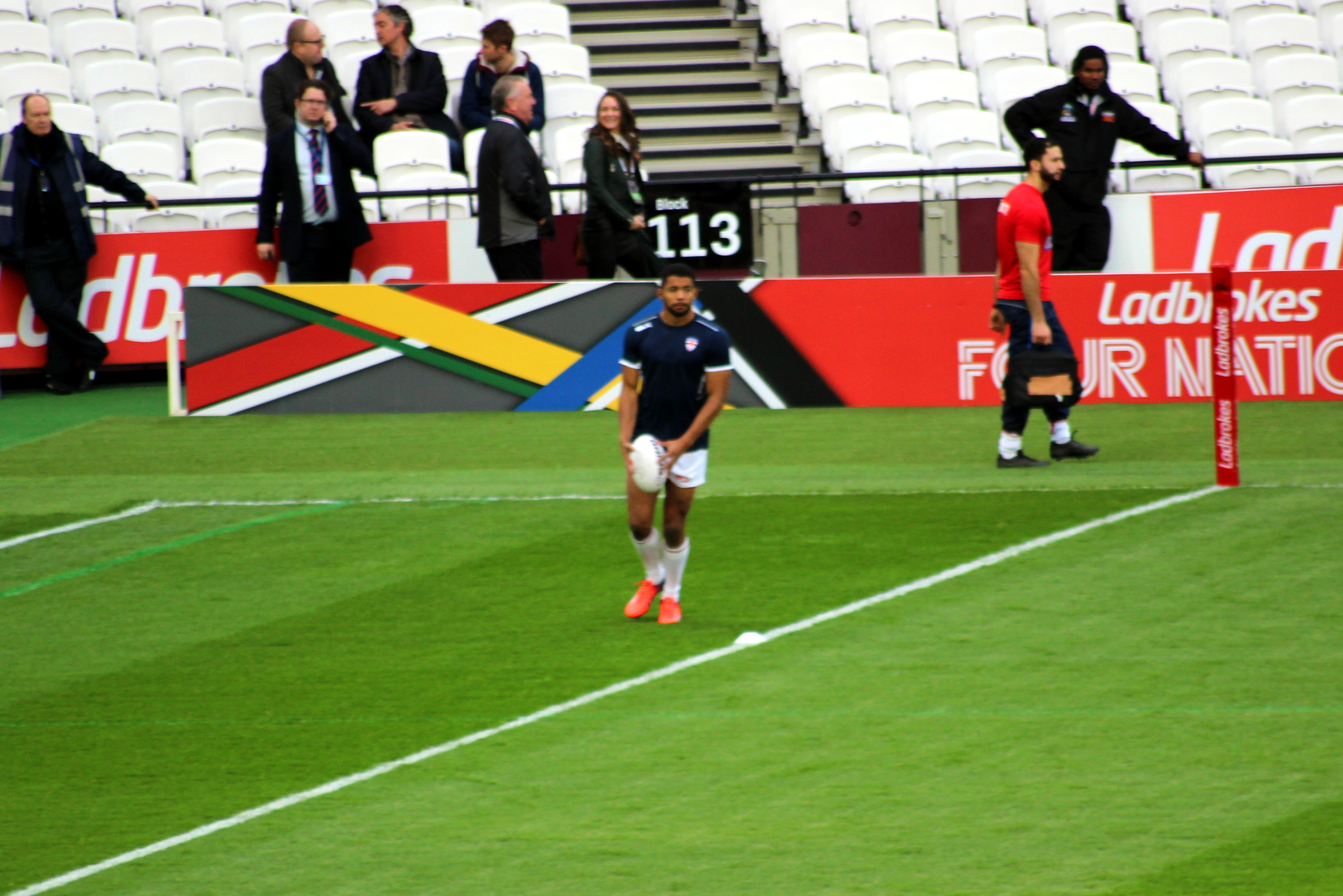
Watkins warming up for England in 2016

In October 2017 he was selected in the England squad for the 2017 Rugby League World Cup.

Watkins was selected by England for the 2021 Rugby League World Cup. He played in all five of England's matches at the tournament including the semi-final loss to Samoa where he made a number of defensive errors which lead to Samoan tries. Watkins also lost the ball over the line during the first half which cost England a try scoring opportunity.

In October 2022 Watkins was named in the England squad for the 2021 Rugby League World Cup.

On October 15, 2026, Watkins replaced the injured Morgan Smithies in the England squad for the 2026 Rugby League World Cup.

== Honours ==
=== Leeds ===
- Super League (6): 2008, 2009, 2011, 2012, 2015, 2017
- League Leaders Shield (2): 2009, 2015
- Challenge Cup (2): 2014, 2015
- World Club Challenge (1): 2012

Runners up (1): 2013, 2017

=== Salford ===
- Challenge Cup

Runners up (1): 2020
