= Ash Handley =

England international rugby league footballer

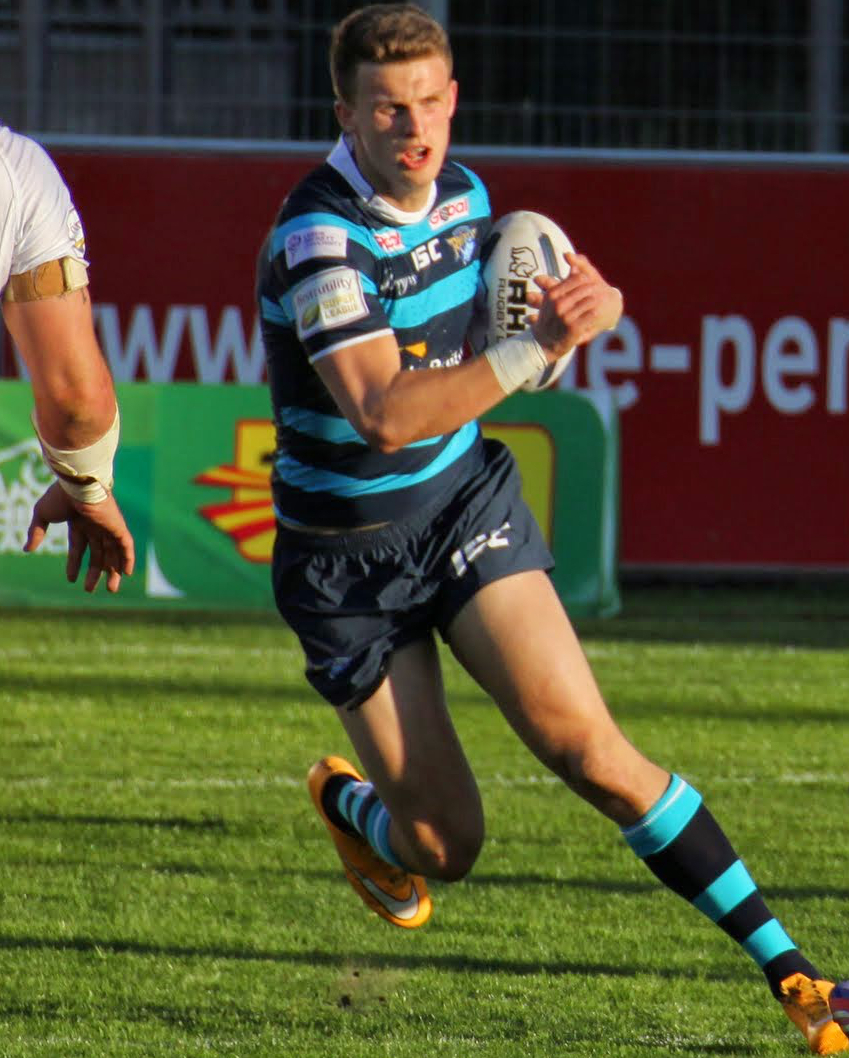

Personal information
- Full name: Ashley Phillip Handley
- Born: 16 February 1996 (age 30) Leeds, West Yorkshire, England
- Height: 6 ft 3 in (1.9 m)
- Weight: 14 st 7 lb (92 kg)

Playing information
- Position: Wing, Centre
Club
| Years | Team | Pld | T | G | FG | P |
|---|---|---|---|---|---|---|
| 2014– | Leeds Rhinos | 212 | 127 | 2 | 0 | 512 |
| 2016(loan) | → Featherstone Rovers | 3 | 2 | 0 | 0 | 8 |
| 2017(loan) | → Featherstone Rovers | 7 | 4 | 0 | 0 | 16 |
| 2018(loan) | → Featherstone Rovers | 1 | 0 | 0 | 0 | 0 |
| | Total | 223 | 133 | 2 | 0 | 536 |
Representative
| Years | Team | Pld | T | G | FG | P |
| 2018 | England Knights | 1 | 0 | 0 | 0 | 0 |
| 2023 | England | 2 | 5 | 0 | 0 | 20 |
- Source: As of 30 October 2024

Ashley Handley (born 16 February 1996) is an English rugby league footballer who plays as a winger and centre for the Leeds Rhinos in the Super League.

He has spent time on loan from Leeds at Featherstone Rovers in the Championship.

== Background ==
Handley was born in Leeds, Yorkshire, England.

== Career ==
Handley played for amateur side Oulton Raiders before signing for Leeds Rhinos. He made his first team début against London Broncos in August 2014. This was Handley's only first team appearance during the 2014 Super League season, and his next first team appearance was in the 2014 Boxing Day friendly fixture against Wakefield Trinity Wildcats when he scored five tries as Leeds won 50-28.

For the 2015 Super League season, Handley was called in the first team squad and scored two tries on his Super League home début as Leeds defeated Wigan Warriors on 20 March 2015.

Assigned squad number 27, Handley established himself as a first team regular and scored a first-half hat trick against St Helens in April 2015 With the second hat-trick coming in July 2015 against the same club - St Helens. Handley has been awarded a place in the main squad in 2016 after his fantastic performance in this year's Rhinos treble winning season, he has been given the 22 Jersey. From the 2019 season, Handley wore the number 5 Jersey replacing Ryan Hall.

On 17 October 2020, he scored two tries for Leeds in the 2020 Challenge Cup Final victory over Salford at Wembley Stadium. In round 17 of the 2022 Betfred Super League season, Handley scored five tries for Leeds in a 62-16 victory over Hull F.C. On 24 September 2022, Handley played for Leeds in their 24-12 loss to St Helens RFC in the 2022 Super League Grand Final. Handley played a total of 23 games for Leeds in the 2023 Super League season and scored 11 tries as the club finished 8th on the table and missed the playoffs. Handley played 18 matches for Leeds in the 2024 Super League and scored 14 tries. The club would finish 8th on the table. Handley played 26 games for Leeds in the 2025 Super League season including their heartbreaking playoff loss to St Helens.

== International career ==
In July 2018 he was selected in the England Knights Performance squad. Later that year he was selected for the England Knights on their tour of Papua New Guinea. He played against Papua New Guinea at the Oil Search National Football Stadium.

He was selected in England 9s squad for the 2019 Rugby League World Cup 9s. On 29 April 2023, Handley scored a hat-trick in England's 64-0 victory over France.
