= Jordan Baldwinson =

English professional rugby league footballer

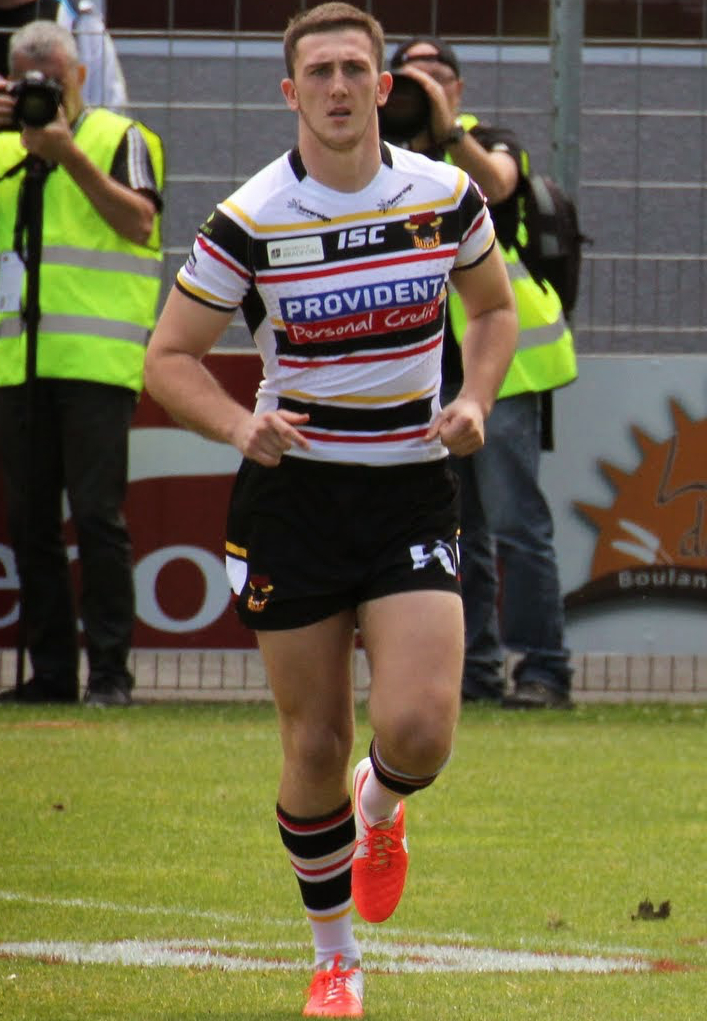

Personal information
- Born: 11 October 1994 (age 32) Leeds, West Yorkshire, England
- Height: 6 ft 3 in (1.91 m)
- Weight: 16 st 7 lb (105 kg)

Playing information
- Position: Loose forward, Prop, Second-row
Club
Years	Team	Pld	T	G	FG	P
2013	Leeds Rhinos	2	0	0	0	0
2014	New Zealand Warriors	0	0	0	0	0
2014(loan)	→ Bradford Bulls	6	0	0	0	0
2015	Featherstone Rovers	33	1	0	0	4
2016–17	Leeds Rhinos	13	1	0	0	4
2016(DR)	→ Featherstone Rovers	28	4	0	0	16
2017(DR)	→ Featherstone Rovers	17	2	0	0	8
2018–19	Wakefield Trinity	4	0	0	0	0
2018(loan)	→ Leigh Centurions	6	0	0	0	0
2018(loan)	→ Halifax	3	0	0	0	0
2019(loan)	→ York City Knights	18	1	0	0	4
2020–21	York City Knights	23	2	0	0	8
2021(loan)	→Bradford Bulls	1	0	0	0	0
2022–24	Bradford Bulls	44	3	0	0	12
2024(loan)	→ Rochdale Hornets	1	0	0	0	0
2025–26	Doncaster	19	0	0	0	0
2026(loan)	→ Hunslet	12	1	0	0	4
2027–	Hunslet	0	0	0	0	0
	Total	230	15	0	0	60
- Source: As of 14 October 2026

Jordan Baldwinson (born 11 October 1994) is an English professional rugby league footballer who plays as a prop, second-row or loose forward for Hunslet RLFC in the RFL Championship.

He played for the Leeds Rhinos in the Super League. Baldwinson was contracted to the New Zealand Warriors in the NRL, and spent time on loan from the Warriors at the Bradford Bulls in the Super League. He spent a season at Featherstone Rovers in the Championship, before returning to Leeds in the top flight, whilst spending time back at Featherstone on loan in the second tier. Baldwinson has also played for Wakefield Trinity in the Super League, and on loan from Wakefield at the Leigh Centurions, Halifax and York in the Championship.

== Background ==
Baldwinson was born in Leeds, West Yorkshire, England. He was brought up in Beeston, Leeds and attended Cockburn High School in Leeds.

== Career ==
=== Leeds Rhinos ===
Baldwinson made his début in 2013 against Widnes Vikings in Round 4. His next appearance would be in Round 19 against Huddersfield. At the end of the season it was announced he had signed a two-year deal with New Zealand Warriors after making only two appearances for Leeds.

=== New Zealand Warriors ===
Baldwinson signed a two-year deal with NRL side New Zealand Warriors, and started out in the Under 20 reserve grade.

=== Bradford Bulls ===
Halfway through the 2014 season he returned to England on loan with Bradford Bulls making his début against Catalans Dragons. He went on to make five appearances for the Bradford side in 2015 before being released by New Zealand Warriors at the end of the season.

=== Featherstone Rovers ===
In 2015, Baldwinson signed a one-year deal with Championship side Featherstone Rovers in their bid to earn promotion to Super League. Featherstone finished the season 5th just outside Qualifiers, ending their hopes of promotion but went on to play in the Championship Shield where they beat London Broncos in the final. Baldwinson made 31 appearances for Featherstone, scoring one try. He was also named young Championship player of the year.

=== Leeds Rhinos ===
Baldwinson returned to Leeds after signing a new deal to play for them in 2016.

=== Wakefield Trinity ===
In August 2017 Baldwinson signed for Wakefield Trinity on a two-year deal from the start of the 2018 season.

=== Halifax ===
In 2018 Baldwinson played on loan for Halifax in the Championship.

=== Bradford Bulls ===
On 29 September 2021 it was reported that he had signed for Bradford in the RFL Championship.

=== Doncaster RLFC ===
On 14 November 2024, it was reported that he had signed for Doncaster in the RFL Championship on a one-year deal.

=== Hunslet RLFC ===
On 14 October 2026 it was reported that he had signed for Hunslet RLFC in the RFL Championship on a 1-year deal.

== Honours ==
Championship Shield: 2015
