= Mitch Achurch =

Australian rugby league player

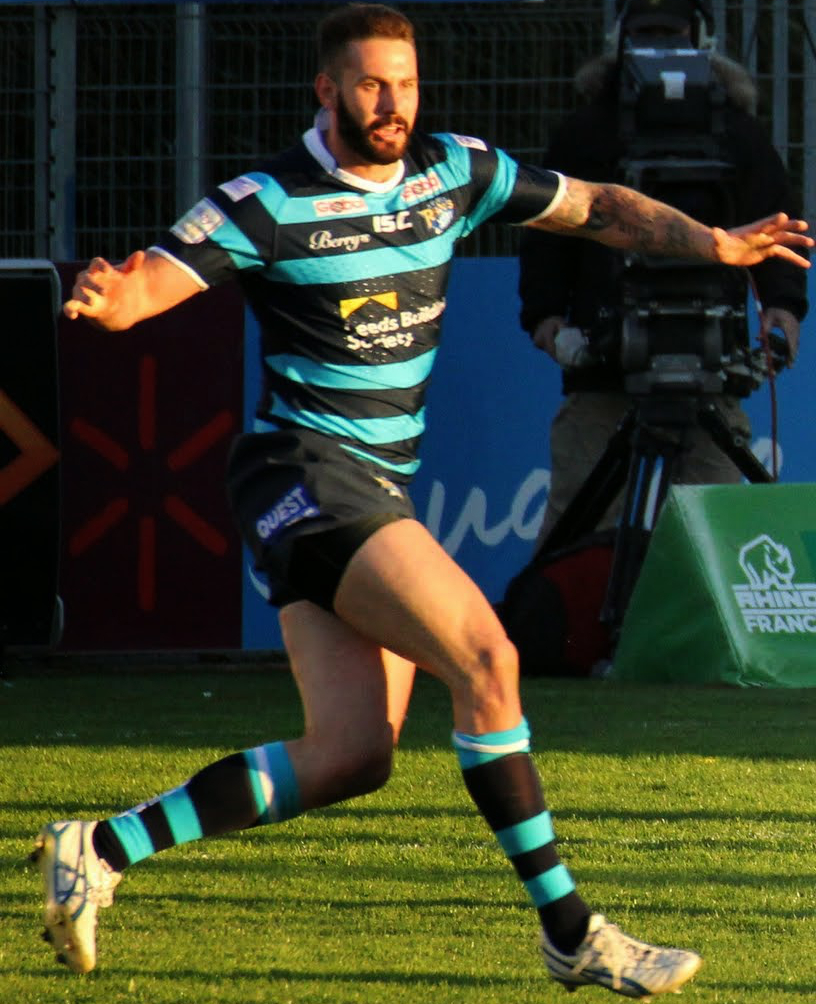

Personal information
- Full name: Mitchell Brett Achurch
- Born: 14 July 1988 (age 37) Baulkham Hills, New South Wales, Australia

Playing information
- Height: 193 cm (6 ft 4 in)
- Weight: 110 kg (17 st 5 lb)
- Position: Prop, Second-row
Club
Years	Team	Pld	T	G	FG	P
2012	Penrith Panthers	11	0	0	0	0
2013–16	Leeds Rhinos	86	17	0	0	68
2013(loan)	→ Hunslet Hawks	4	1	0	0	4
2016(loan)	→ Featherstone Rovers	3	0	0	0	0
	Total	104	18	0	0	72

Mitchell Brett Achurch (born 14 July 1988) is an Australian rugby league footballer who most recently played for the Leeds Rhinos in the Super League, and Featherstone Rovers (loan) in the Championship. His choice of position is second-row.

== Playing career ==
After previously playing lower grade rugby for Western Suburbs in the NSW Cup, Achurch made his NRL début in round 4 of the 2012 NRL season against the Parramatta Eels, playing for the Penrith Panthers, who went on to win the game 39-6

During August 2012, Achurch signed for Leeds on a four-year contract starting in the 2013 season.

He played in the 2015 Challenge Cup Final victory over Hull Kingston Rovers at Wembley Stadium.

He was left out of the 2015 Super League Grand Final victory over the Wigan Warriors at Old Trafford.

Achurch played for Ron Massey Cup side the Guildford Owls during the 2017 season. He was named in the 2017 Ron Massey Cup team of the season.
