= Robbie Ward =

English rugby league footballer

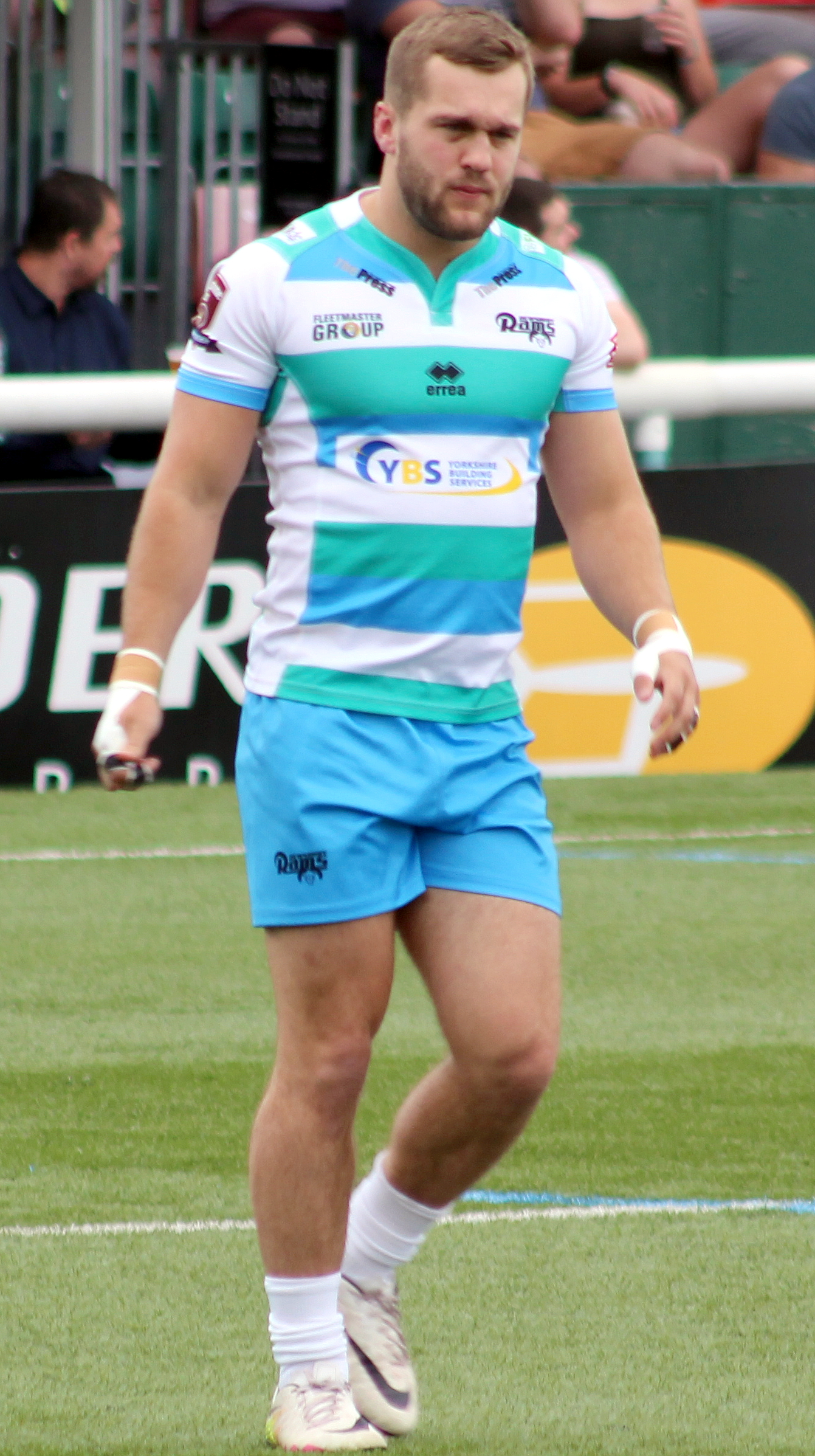

Personal information
- Full name: Robert Ward
- Born: 27 October 1995 (age 30) England
- Height: 5 ft 9 in (1.74 m)
- Weight: 15 st 4 lb (97 kg)

Playing information
- Position: Hooker
Club
Years	Team	Pld	T	G	FG	P
2014–16	Leeds Rhinos	11	2	0	0	8
2015(DR)	→ Hunslet Hawks	5	1	0	0	4
2016–17(loan)	→ Featherstone Rovers	5	0	0	0	0
2017–19	Dewsbury Rams	54	8	0	0	32
2020–21	Sheffield Eagles	7	1	0	0	4
2021(loan)	→ Doncaster RLFC	1	1	0	0	4
	Total	83	13	0	0	52
- Source: As of 19 September 2026

Robbie Ward is an English former rugby league footballer who last played as a hooker for the Sheffield Eagles in the RFL Championship.

== Career ==
Ward made his senior début for Leeds on 23 May 2014 in a Super League match against Hull F.C. Overall, he played eleven times for the club in 2014 and 2015, scoring two tries. Ward was released by Leeds at the end of 2015. During 2015, he was dual registered with the Hunslet Hawks in the Championship and played five times for the club, scoring one try.

After departing Leeds he moved to Australia where he signed for the Sunshine Coast Falcons in the Queensland Cup, but moved back to England part way through the season signing for Featherstone Rovers. In September 2016 he signed for the Dewsbury Rams.

In Autumn 2019, Ward signed a 2year deal with the Sheffield Eagles.
