= Adam Cuthbertson =

Australian rugby league footballer

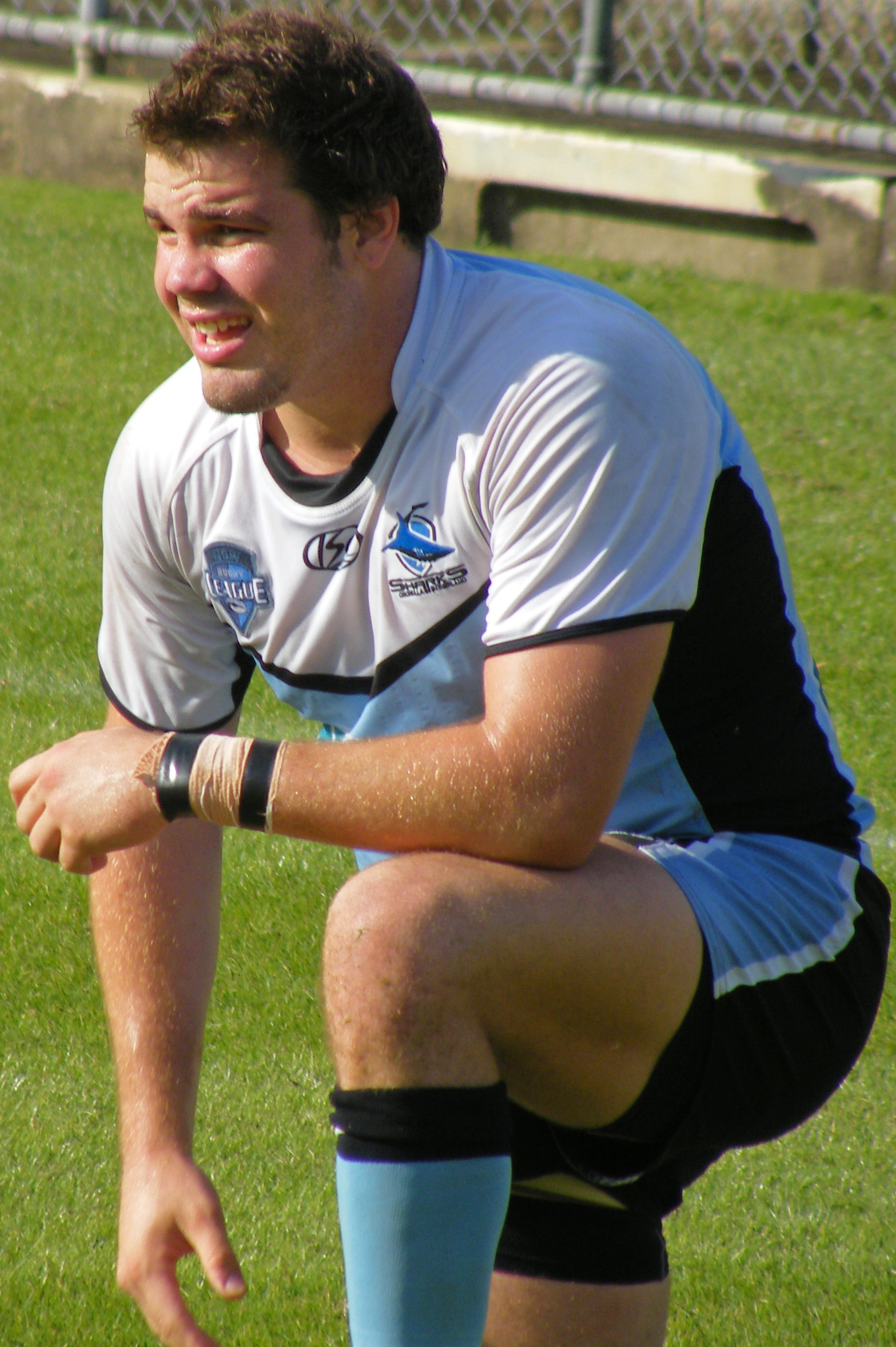

Personal information
- Full name: Adam William Cuthbertson
- Born: 24 February 1985 (age 41) Manly, New South Wales, Australia
- Height: 6 ft 2 in (1.88 m)
- Weight: 16 st 10 lb (106 kg)

Playing information
- Position: Prop, Loose forward, Second-row
Club
Years	Team	Pld	T	G	FG	P
2006–09	Manly Sea Eagles	54	8	0	0	32
2010	Cronulla Sharks	12	0	0	0	0
2011	St. George Illawarra	19	2	0	0	8
2012–14	Newcastle Knights	53	2	0	0	8
2015–20	Leeds Rhinos	157	36	0	0	144
2021	York City Knights	15	0	0	0	0
2022	Featherstone Rovers	13	1	0	0	4
2023	Mackay Cutters	0	0	0	0	0
	Total	323	49	0	0	196
Representative
Years	Team	Pld	T	G	FG	P
2011–13	City NSW	2	0	0	0	0

Coaching information
Club
Years	Team	Gms	W	D	L	W%
2019–20	Leeds Rhinos Women
2025	Mackay Cutters
	Total	0	0	0	0
- Source: As of 30 August 2024

Adam Cuthbertson (born 24 February 1985) is an Australian professional rugby league coach who is the head coach of the Mackay Cutters in the Queensland Cup and a former professional rugby league footballer who played as a loose forward, prop and second-row forward for the Mackay Cutters in the Queensland Cup.

He was appointed head-coach of the Mackay Cutters for 2025.

He has previously most recently played in England for Featherstone Rovers and York City Knights.

Cuthbertson played for the Manly Warringah Sea Eagles, Cronulla-Sutherland Sharks, St. George Illawarra Dragons and the Newcastle Knights in the NRL, and the Leeds Rhinos in the Super League

== Background ==
Cuthbertson was born in Manly, New South Wales, Australia.

== Playing career ==
=== Manly-Warringah Sea Eagles ===
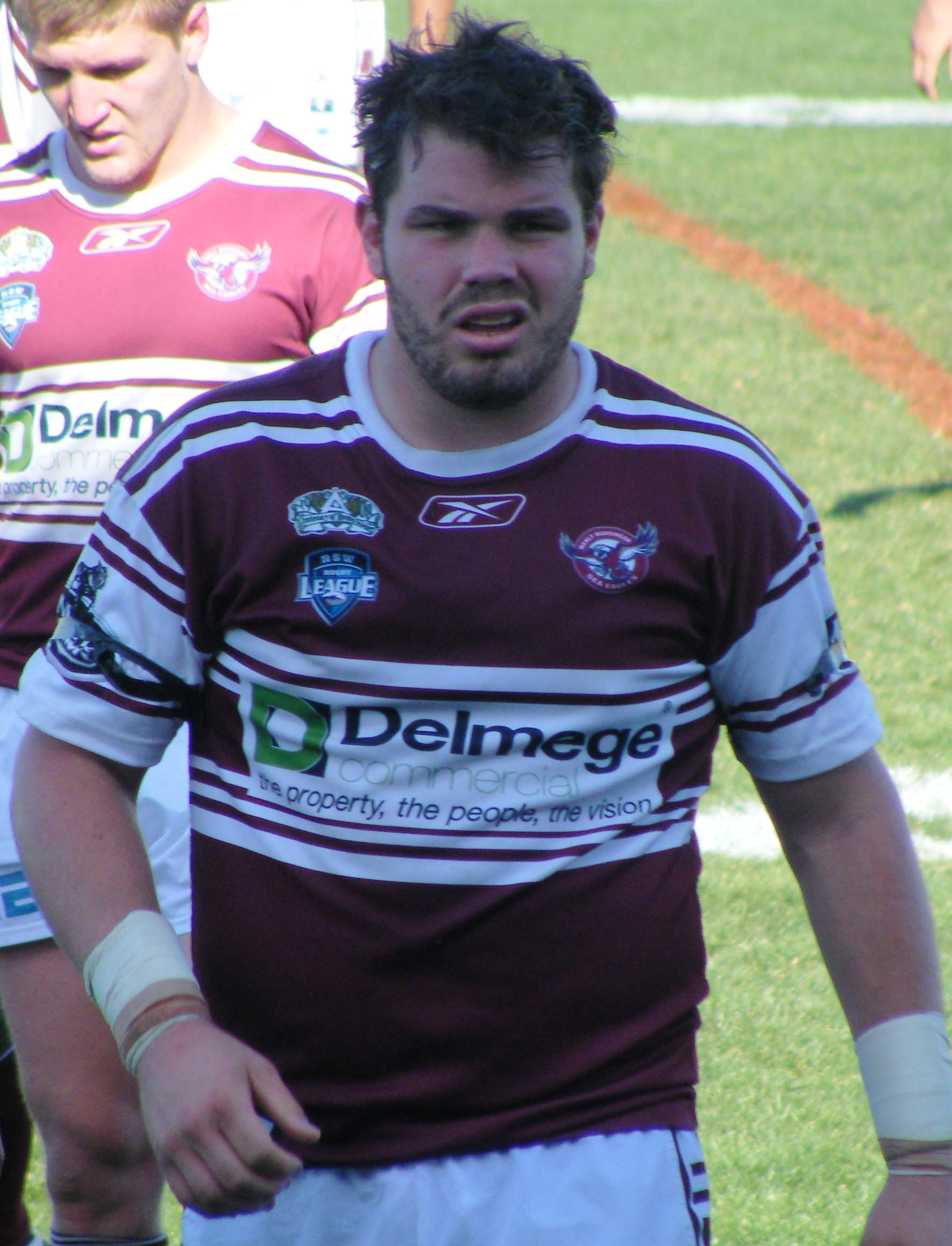
Cuthbertson playing for the Sea Eagles

Born in Manly, New South Wales, Cuthbertson played his junior football for the Avalon Bulldogs and the Newport Breakers Rugby Union team before being signed by the Manly-Warringah Sea Eagles. He played for the Sea Eagles Premier League reserve-grade team in 2006.

In round 3 of the 2006 NRL season, Cuthbertson made his NRL debut for the Manly club against rivals the Cronulla-Sutherland Sharks. In 2007, Cuthbertson was rewarded with a Man of the Match award for his performance against the Wests Tigers in round 16. Channel Nine commentator Phil Gould compared Cuthbertson's image to that of Manly legend Graham Eadie.

In 2007, Cuthbertson re-signed with the Manly side on a three-year contract. In 2007, Cuthbertson credited finding Christianity a year earlier as the catalyst for his rise from obscurity.

Cuthbertson played on the bench in Manly club's 2007 NRL Grand Final defeat by the Melbourne Storm.

In round 12 of the 2008 NRL season, Cuthbertson was sent off in a match against the Canberra Raiders for a high shot on Troy Thompson. Cuthbertson made 21 appearances for Manly in 2008 but did not feature in the finals series or Manly's 40-0 grand final victory over Melbourne.

Cuthbertson played on the bench in Manly's 2009 World Club Challenge win over the Leeds Rhinos, with the club winning 28-20. In 2009, Cuthbertson was selected for the NSW City Origin team to play the NSW Country Origin side in the annual City vs Country Origin match. However, he did not play in the match after withdrawing due to an injury.

=== Cronulla-Sutherland Sharks ===
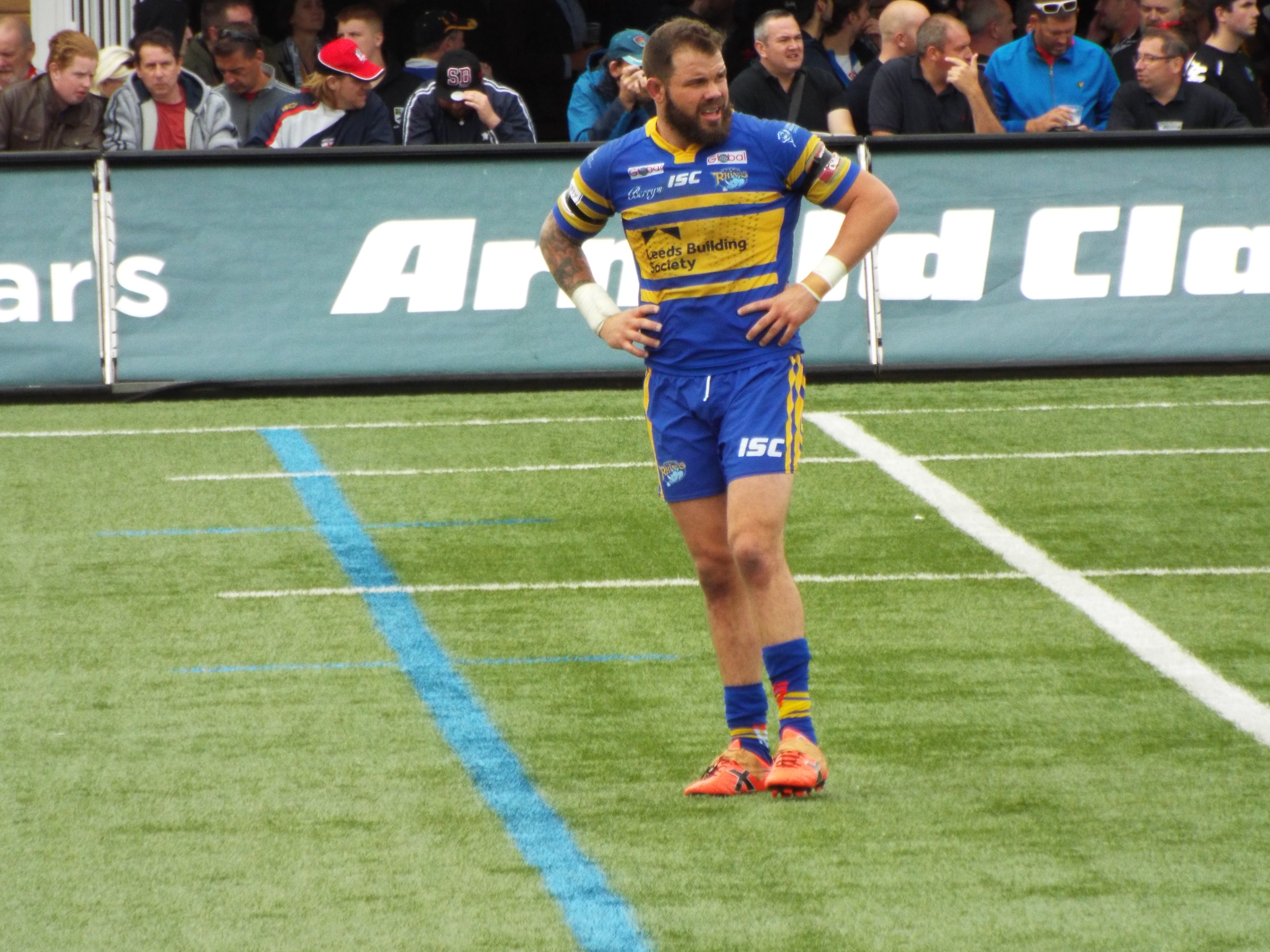
Cuthbertson playing for the Leeds Rhinos in 2016

On 18 June 2009, Cuthbertson signed a two-year contract with the Cronulla-Sutherland Sharks starting in 2010.

Cuthbertson only played 12 games for the Cronulla side before being released from his contract.

=== St. George Illawarra Dragons ===
At the end of 2010, Cuthbertson was named in the Penrith Panthers 2011 pre-season squad but ended up signing a one-year contract with the St. George Illawarra Dragons starting in 2011 to try and revive his career under supercoach Wayne Bennett.

In 2011, Cuthbertson was again selected for City Origin, this time playing. Cuthbertson went on to play 19 games in 2011, scoring two tries for St. George Illawarra.

=== Newcastle Knights ===
On 26 October 2011, Cuthbertson signed a three-year contract with the Newcastle Knights starting in 2012. Cuthbertson had a slow start to 2012 but finished the year having played 22 games in his first season for the Newcastle side.

=== Leeds Rhinos ===
On 26 May 2014, Cuthbertson signed a four-year contract with the Leeds Rhinos starting in 2015. He made an impact in his first season at Leeds, helping the team to win the Challenge Cup in a 50-0 victory over Hull Kingston Rovers at Wembley Stadium.

Cuthbertson won the League Leaders' Shield after a last second victory over Huddersfield Giants. He set a new Super League record for offloads with 125.

Cuthbertson played in the 2015 Super League Grand Final victory over the Wigan Warriors at Old Trafford.

Cuthbertson played in the 2017 Super League Grand Final victory over the Castleford Tigers at Old Trafford.

On 17 October 2020, Cuthbertson played in the 2020 Challenge Cup Final victory for Leeds over Salford at Wembley Stadium.

=== York City Knights ===
On 27 September 2020 it was announced that Cuthbertson would join the York City Knights for the 2021 season.

=== Honours ===
Manly Warringah Sea Eagles

- World Club Challenge (1): 2009

Leeds Rhinos

- Super League (2): 2015, 2017
- League Leaders' Shield (1): 2015
- Challenge Cup (2): 2015, 2020
