= 2019 Leeds Rhinos season =

- Super League Rank: 9th
- Play-off result: Did not qualify
- Challenge Cup: 6th Round (lost to Bradford Bulls 22–24)
- 2019 record: Wins: 13; draws: 0; losses: 18
- Points scored: For: 650; against: 644

Team information
- CEO: Gary Hetherington
- Head Coach: ~~David Furner~~ → Richard Agar (interim)
- Captain: Kallum Watkins
- Stadium: Emerald Headingley Stadium
- Avg. attendance: 12,158 (Not including home matches away from Headingley)
- Agg. attendance: 182,375 (Not including home matches away from Headingley)
- High attendance: 14,085 (vs Warrington Wolves Round 29) Not including home matches away from Headingley
- Low attendance: 4,197 (vs Workington Town Challenge Cup R5) Not including home matches away from Headingley

Top scorers
- Tries: Ash Handley (22)
- Goals: Liam Sutcliffe (52)
- Points: Liam Sutcliffe (128)
← 2018	List of seasons	2020 →

The 2019 Leeds Rhinos season was the club's 24th season within the Super League. It was the coach's David Furner first season at the club but following 5 wins and 11 losses, including a Challenge Cup elimination his contract was terminated and he was replaced by assistant coach Richard Agar for the interim. Kallum Watkins was the club captain for the second consecutive year.

== Super League ==
Win Draw Loss

Date	Round	Opponent	H/A	Venue	Score	Tries	Goals	Attendance	Report
Sat 2 Feb 17:15	1	Warrington Wolves	A	Halliwell Jones Stadium	6-26	S. Ward	T. Lolohea (1)	13,098	Report
Fri 8 Feb 19:45	2	Wigan Warriors	A	JJB Stadium	16-34	B. Ferres, A. Handley, K. Watkins	T. Lolohea (2)	11,032	Report
Sun 17 Feb 15:00	10	Salford Red Devils	A	Salford City Stadium	46-14	J. Walker (3), K. Hurrell (2), A. Cuthbertson, A. Handley, M. Parcell	T. Lolohea (7)	4,385	Report

=== Table ===
Pos	Team	Pld	W	D	L	PF	PA	PD	Pts	Qualification
1	St. Helens	29	26	0	3	916	395	+521	52	League Leaders' Shield/ Play-off Semi Final
2	Wigan Warriors	29	18	0	11	699	539	+160	36	Play-off Qualifying Final
3	Salford Red Devils	29	17	0	12	783	597	+186	34	Play-off Qualifying Final
4	Warrington Wolves	29	16	0	13	709	533	+176	32	Play-off Elimination Final
5	Castleford Tigers	29	15	0	14	646	558	+88	30	Play-off Elimination Final
6	Hull F.C.	29	15	0	14	645	768	−123	30	
7	Catalans Dragons	29	13	0	16	553	745	−192	26	
8	Leeds Rhinos	29	12	0	17	650	644	+6	24	
9	Wakefield Trinity	29	11	0	18	608	723	−115	22	
10	Huddersfield Giants	29	11	0	18	571	776	−205	22	
11	Hull KR	29	10	0	19	548	768	−220	20	
12	London Broncos	29	10	0	19	505	787	−282	20	Relegated to Championship

== Squad ==
2019 Leeds Rhinos
First team squad			Coaching staff
(England) Jack Walker – FB; 2 (England) Tom Briscoe – WG; 3 (England) Kallum Watkins (c) – CE, WG; 4 (Tonga) Konrad Hurrell – CE; 5 (England) Ash Handley – WG, CE; 6 (New Zealand) Tuimoala Lolohea – FE, FB; 7 (England) Richard Myler – HB; 8 (Australia) Adam Cuthbertson – PR, LF; 9 (Australia) Matt Parcell – HK; 10 (England) Brad Singleton – PR, LF; 11 (Australia) Trent Merrin – SR, LF, PR; 12 (England) Carl Ablett – SR, CE, LF; 13 (England) Stevie Ward – SR, LF	14 (England) Brad Dwyer – HK; 15 (England) Liam Sutcliffe – FE, CE, FB, SR, HB; 16 (England) Brett Ferres – SR, LF; 17 (England) Dom Crosby – PR; 18 (New Zealand) Nathaniel Peteru – PR; 19 (Poland) Mikolaj Oledzki – PR; 20 (England) Jamie Jones-Buchanan – SR, LF; 21 (Jamaica) Ashton Golding – FB, WG; 22 (England) Cameron Smith – SR, LF; 23 (England) Callum McLelland – HB, FE; 24 (England) Luke Briscoe – WG; 25 (England) James Donaldson – LF; 26 (England) Anthony Mullally – positions	27 (England) Jack Ormondroyd – positions; 28 (England) Josh Walters – SR, LF; 29 (England) Harry Newman – CE; 30 (England) Alex Sutcliffe – CE, SR; 31 (England) Dan Waite-Pullan – SR; 32 (England) Thomas Holroyd – PR; 33 (England) Owen Trout – SR, LF; 34 (England) Corey Johnson – HK; 35 (England) Tyler Dupree – PR; 36 (Papua New Guinea) Wellington Albert – PR; 38 (New Zealand) Ava Seumanufagai – PR; 39 (England) Shaun Lunt – HK; 40 (Australia) Robert Lui – FE	Head coach: ~~David Furner~~ → Richard Agar; Legend: (c) Captain(s); (vc) Vice-captain(s); Updated: 28 November 2018; Source(s): 2019 Squad

== Challenge Cup ==
Win Draw Loss

Date	Round	Opponent	H/A	Venue	Score	Tries	Goals	Attendance	Report
Fri 12 April 19:45	5	Workington Town	H	Emerald Headingley Stadium	78-6	Harry Newman (4), Richard Myler (3), Ashton Golding (2), Wellington Albert, Luke Briscoe, Brett Ferres, Matt Parcell	Liam Sutcliffe (13)	4,197	
Sat 11 May 14:30	6	Bradford Bulls	A	Odsal Stadium	22-24	Harry Newman, Tom Briscoe, Callum McLelland, Tuimoala Lolohea	Liam Sutcliffe (3)	10,258	

== Transfers ==
2019 Gains:

- Tui Lolohea from Wests Tigers
- Callum McLelland from rugby union
- Trent Merrin from Penrith Panthers
- Konrad Hurrell from Gold Coast Titans
- Dom Crosby from Warrington Wolves
- Danny Tickle from Workington Town

2019 Losses:

- Ryan Hall to Sydney Roosters
- Joel Moon released
- Brett Delaney to Featherstone Rovers
- Jimmy Keinhorst to Hull Kingston Rovers
- Mitch Garbutt to Hull Kingston Rovers
- Jordan Thompson to Hull FC
