= 2013 Leeds Rhinos season =

- Super League XVIII Rank: 3rd
- Play-off result: Semi-final
- Challenge Cup: 5th round
- 2013 record: Wins: 21; draws: 1; losses: 9
- Points scored: For: 773; against: 577

Team information
- Chairman: Paul Caddick
- Head Coach: Brian McDermott
- Captain: Kevin Sinfield
- Stadium: Headingley Stadium

Top scorers
- Tries: Kallum Watkins - 20
- Goals: Kevin Sinfield - 106
- Points: Kevin Sinfield - 230
← 2012	List of seasons	2014 →

This article details the Leeds Rhinos rugby league football club's 2013 season. This was the 18th season of the Super League era. The Rhinos enter the 2013 season as champions after defeating Warrington Wolves 26-18 in the 2012 Super League Grand Final.

== Pre season friendlies ==
LEGEND
Win
Draw
Loss

Rhinos score is first.

Date	Competition	Vrs	H/A	Venue	Result	Score	Tries	Goals	Att	Report
26/12/2012	Pre Season	Wakefield Trinity Wildcats	H	Headingley Stadium	W	40-26	Vickery (2), Singleton (2), Watson, Chisholm, Foster, Moon	McShane 4/6, Sutcliffe 0/2	9,347	Report
20/1/2013	Pre Season	Bradford Bulls	H	Headingley Stadium	D	24-24	Vickery (2), Burrow, Hall, McGuire	Sinfield 2/5	6,106	Report
27/1/2013	Pre Season	Hunslet Hawks	A	South Leeds Stadium	W	10-6	Watson, Sunley	Morgan 1/2	742	Report

== Player appearances ==
- Friendly Games Only

FB=Fullback	C=Centre	W=Winger	SO=Stand Off	SH=Scrum half	P=Prop	H=Hooker	SR=Second Row	LF=Loose forward	B=Bench

No	Player	1	2	3
1	Zak Hardaker	x	FB	x
2	Ben Jones-Bishop			
3	Kallum Watkins	x	C	x
4	Joel Moon	C	C	x
5	Ryan Hall	x	W	x
6	Danny McGuire	SO	SH	x
7	Rob Burrow	x	H	x
8	Kylie Leuluai	x	x	x
9	Paul McShane	SH	B	x
10	Jamie Peacock	x	P	x
11	Jamie Jones-Buchanan	x	SR	x
12	Carl Ablett	x	L	x
13	Kevin Sinfield	x	SO	x
14	Stevie Ward			L
15	Brett Delaney	x	SR	x
16	Ryan Bailey	P	B	x
17	Ian Kirke	SR	P	x
18	Chris Clarkson	x	B	x
19	Mitch Achurch	SR	B	B
20	Darrell Griffin	x	B	x
21	Richard Moore			P
22	Jimmy Keinhorst	C	x	C
23	Brad Singleton	P	x	x
24	Liam Hood	H	x	H
25	Joe Vickery	W	W	x

= Injured

= Suspended

== Table ==
Super League XVIII
Pos	Team	Pld	W	D	L	PF	PA	PD	Pts	Qualification
1	Huddersfield Giants (L)	27	21	0	6	851	507	+344	42	Play-offs
2	Warrington Wolves	27	20	1	6	836	461	+375	41	Play-offs
3	Leeds Rhinos	27	18	1	8	712	507	+205	37	Play-offs
4	Wigan Warriors (C)	27	17	1	9	816	460	+356	35	Play-offs
5	St. Helens	27	15	1	11	678	536	+142	31	Play-offs
6	Hull F.C.	27	13	2	12	652	563	+89	28	Play-offs
7	Catalans Dragons	27	13	2	12	619	604	+15	28	Play-offs
8	Hull Kingston Rovers	27	13	0	14	642	760	−118	26	Play-offs
9	Bradford Bulls	27	10	2	15	640	658	−18	22	
10	Widnes Vikings	27	10	2	15	695	841	−146	22	
11	Wakefield Trinity Wildcats	27	10	1	16	660	749	−89	21	
12	Castleford Tigers	27	9	2	16	702	881	−179	20	
13	London Broncos	27	5	2	20	487	946	−459	12	
14	Salford City Reds	27	6	1	20	436	953	−517	11 (Note: Salford deducted 2 points on 14 June 2013 for fielding 14 players during home game against Castleford)	

Source: superleague.co.uk and BBC Sport
Rules for classification: 1st on competition points; 2nd on match points difference. Competition points: for win = 2; for draw = 1; for loss = 0.
(C) Champions; (L) League Leaders' Shield Winners

== World Club Challenge ==
LEGEND
Win
Draw
Loss

Date	Competition	Vrs	H/A	Venue	Result	Score	Tries	Goals	Att	TV	Report
22/2/13	WCC	Storm	H	Headingley Stadium	L	14-18	Hall, Jones-Buchanan	Sinfield 3/3	20,400	Sky Sports	Report

2013 World Club Challenge Teams
Leeds Rhinos	positions	Melbourne Storm
3. Kallum Watkins	Fullback	1. Billy Slater
25. Joe Vickery	Winger	2. Sisa Waqa
12. Carl Ablett	Centre	3. Will Chambers
4. Joel Moon	Centre	4. Justin O'Neill
5. Ryan Hall	Winger	5. Mahe Fonua
13. Kevin Sinfield	Stand off	6. Gareth Widdop
6. Danny McGuire	Scrum half	7. Cooper Cronk
8. Kylie Leuluai	Prop	8. Jesse Bromwich
7. Rob Burrow	Hooker	9. Cameron Smith
10. Jamie Peacock	Prop	10. Bryan Norrie
15. Brett Delaney	2nd Row	11. Tohu Harris
14. Stevie Ward	2nd Row	12. Ryan Hoffman
11. Jamie Jones-Buchanan	Loose forward	13. Ryan Hinchcliffe
9. Paul McShane	Interchange	14. Jason Ryles
17. Ian Kirke	Interchange	15. Siosaia Vave
18. Chris Clarkson	Interchange	16. Junior Moors
19. Mitch Achurch	Interchange	17. Lagi Setu
Brian McDermott	Coach	Craig Bellamy

== 2013 fixtures and results ==
LEGEND
Win
Draw
Loss

2013 Engage Super League

Date	Competition	Rnd	Vrs	H/A	Venue	Result	Score	Tries	Goals	Att	Live on TV	Report
1/2/13	Super League XVIII	1	Hull FC	H	Headingley Stadium	W	36-6	Sinfield, Moon, Peacock, Clarkson, McGuire, Hall	Sinfield 6/6	15,297	Sky Sports	Report
10/2/13	Super League XVIII	2	Tigers	A	The Jungle	L	12-14	McGuire, Hall	Sinfield 2/2	9,103	-	Report
15/2/13	Super League XVIII	3	Salford City Reds	H	Headingley Stadium	W	42-14	Ward, Moon (2), Watkins, McShane (2), Sinfield	Sinfield 7/7	12,558	-	Report
1/3/13	Super League XVIII	5	Saints	A	Langtree Park	W	20-12	Hall (2), Leuluai	Sinfield 4/5	12,228	Sky Sports	Report
8/3/13	Super League XVIII	6	Giants	H	Headingley Stadium	L	8-32	McShane	Sinfield 2/2	15,013	-	Report
15/3/13	Super League XVIII	7	Warriors	H	Headingley Stadium	W	18-14	Hall, Moon, Jones-Buchanan	Sinfield 3/3	15,524	Sky Sports	Report
28/3/13	Super League XVIII	9	Bulls	H	Headingley Stadium	D	18-18	Watkins, Achurch, Peacock	Sinfield 3/3	16,604	Sky Sports	Report
1/4/13	Super League XVIII	10	Dragons	A	Stade Gilbert Brutus	W	27-12	Moon, McShane, Jones-Buchanan	Sinfield 7/7, Sinfield 1 DG	9,465	Sky Sports	Report
6/4/13	Super League XVIII	11	Wolves	H	Headingley Stadium	W	28-22	McGuire, Hall (2), Watkins, McShane	Sinfield 4/7	15,059	Sky Sports	Report
12/4/13	Super League XVIII	12	Broncos	H	Headingley Stadium	W	30-6	Moon (2), Hardaker, McGuire, Watkins	Sinfield 5/6	12,855	-	Report
28/4/13	Super League XVIII	13	Hull Kingston Rovers	A	Craven Park	W	44-10	Hall, Delaney, Hardaker, Achurch, Moon, Watkins (2), Kirke	Sinfield 6/8	8,122	-	Match Report
3/5/13	Super League XVIII	14	Bulls	A	Odsal Stadium	W	42-22	Watkins, Achurch, Ablett (2), McGuire, Bailey, Hardaker	Sinfield 7/7	12,016	Sky Sports	Report
20/5/13	Super League XVIII	15	Saints	H	Headingley Stadium	L	22-30	Watkins, Moon, Burrow, Bailey	Sinfield 3/4	15,998	Sky Sports	Report
26/5/13	Magic Weekend	16	Warriors	N	Etihad Stadium	L	16-20	Sinfield, Watkins, Vickery	Sinfield 2/4	31,249	Sky Sports	Report
31/5/13	Super League XVIII	17	Hull FC	A	KC Stadium	L	6-18	Delaney	Sinfield 1/1	11,901	Sky Sports	Match Report
7/6/13	Super League XVIII	18	Tigers	H	Headingley Stadium	W	42-24	Minns, Keinhorst (3), Hardaker, Kirke, Moon	Sinfield 7/8	17,035	-	Report
17/6/13	Super League XVIII	4	Vikings	H	Headingley Stadium	W	38-28	Burrow (2), Jones-Bishop, Jones-Buchanan, Hall (2), Sutcliffe	Hardaker 5/7	12,782	Sky Sports	Report
23/6/13	Super League XVIII	19	Giants	A	Galpharm Stadium	L	18-40	Sutcliffe (2), Jones-Bishop	Hardaker 3/3	7,756	-	Report
30/6/13	Super League XVIII	20	Vikings	A	Stobart Stadium	W	52-36	Moon (2), Sutcliffe (2), Burrow (2), Hall, Hardaker, Jones-Bishop, Watkins	Hardaker 6/10	6,230	-	Report
5/7/13	Super League XVIII	21	Wolves	A	Halliwell Jones Stadium	L	18-19	Hall (2), Sutcliffe, Hardaker	Hardaker 1/4	11,281	Sky Sports	Report
19/7/13	Super League XVIII	22	Wakefield Trinity Wildcats	H	Headingley Stadium	W	20-18	Jones-Bishop (2), Moon, Hall	Burrow 2/4	18,387	-	Report
26/7/13	Super League XVIII	8	Wakefield Trinity Wildcats	A	Belle Vue	W	31-24	Duckworth, Jones-Bishop, Moon, Ablett, Burrow	Sinfield 5/5, Sinfield 1 DG	10,031	-	Report
1/8/13	Super League XVIII	23	Broncos	A	Twickenham Stoop	W	30-12	Peacock, Jones-Bishop, Foster, McShane (2)	Sinfield 5/5	2,377	Sky Sports	Match Report
9/8/13	Super League XVIII	24	Salford City Reds	A	City of Salford Stadium	W	42-16	Watkins (2), Hardaker, Burrow, Ablett, Jones-Bishop, Minchella	Sinfield 7/7	3,235	-	Report
16/8/13	Super League XVIII	25	Hull Kingston Rovers	H	Headingley Stadium	L	12-16	Watkins (2)	Sinfield 2/2	14,868	Sky Sports	Report
30/8/13	Super League XVIII	26	Dragons	H	Headingley Stadium	W	20-12	Hall, Achurch, McGuire	Sinfield 4/4	15,576	-	Report
6/9/13	Super League XVIII	27	Warriors	A	DW Stadium	W	20-6	Jones-Bishop, Ablett, Moon, Watkins	Sinfield 2/4	14,982	Sky Sports	Report

== Player appearances ==
- Super League Only

FB=Fullback	C=Centre	W=Winger	SO=Stand-off	SH=Scrum half	PR=Prop	H=Hooker	SR=Second Row	L=Loose forward	B=Bench

No	Player	1	2	3	5	6	7	9	10	11	12	13	14	15	16	17	18	4	19	20	21	22	8	23	24	25	26	27
1	Zak Hardaker	FB	FB	FB						FB	FB	FB	FB	FB	FB	FB	FB	FB	FB	FB	FB	FB	C	FB	FB	C	FB	FB
2	Ben Jones-Bishop																	W	W	W	W	W	FB	W	W	FB	W	W
3	Kallum Watkins	C	C	C	FB	FB	FB	FB	FB	W	W	W	W	C	C	C				C	C	C		C	C	C	C	C
4	Joel Moon	C	C	C	C	C	C	C	C	C	C	C	C	C	C	C	C	C		C	C	C	C	C			C	C
5	Ryan Hall	W	W	W	W	W	W	W	W	W	W	W	W	W	W	W	W	W	W	W	W	W	W	W		W	W	W
6	Danny McGuire	SH	SH	SH	SH	SH	SH	SH	SH	SH	SH	SH	SH	SH	SH	SH											SH	SH
7	Rob Burrow	H	H	H	H	H	H	H	H	H	H	H	H	H	H	H	SH	SH	SH	SH	SH	SH	SH	SH	SH	SH	x	H
8	Kylie Leuluai		x	P	P	P	P	P		P	P	P	P	P	P	P	P						B	P	P	P	B	P
9	Paul McShane	B	B	B	B	B	x	x	B	B	B	B	B	x	B	B	H	H	H	H	H	H	x	B	H	H		
10	Jamie Peacock	P	P	x	P	B	P	P	P	P	P	P	P				P	P	P	P	P	P	P	P	P	P	P	P
11	Jamie Jones-Buchanan	SR	SR	P	L	L	SR	SR	SR	L	L	L	L	SR	SR	SR	SR	SR	SR									SR
12	Carl Ablett	L	L	L	C	C	C	C	C	C	C	C	C						SR	SR	SR	SR	SR	SR	SR	SR	SR	SR
13	Kevin Sinfield	SO	SO	SO	SO	SO	SO	SO	SO	SO	SO	SO	SO	SO	SO	SO	SO						H	H	SO	SO	H	SO
14	Stevie Ward	x	x	SR	SR	B	B	B	L	SR	SR	SR																
15	Brett Delaney	SR	SR	x	SR	SR	SR	SR	SR			SR	SR	SR		SR	SR					B	L	L				B
16	Ryan Bailey	P	P			L	x	L	P	Red card	Red card	Red card	B	P	P	P	L										L	Red card
17	Ian Kirke	B	B	B	B	P	B	B	B		B	B	B	B	B	B	B	P	B	B	B	P	B	B	B	B	B	B
18	Chris Clarkson	B	B	SR	B	SR	x	x	x	B	B	B	B	L	SR	L		SR	B	SR	SR	SR	SR	SR	SR	SR	SR	x
19	Mitch Achurch	B	B	B	x	x	B	B	B	SR	SR	B	SR	B	B		B	B	B	B	B					x	B	B
20	Darrell Griffin	x	x	x	x	x	x	x	x	x	x	x	x	x	x	x	x	x	x	x	x	x	x	x	x	x	x	x
21	Richard Moore	x	x	B	B	B	B	B	B	B	x	x	x	B	x	x	x	B	P	P	P	B	B	B	L	B	x	x
22	Jimmy Keinhorst	x	W	W	x	x	x	x	x	x	x	x	x	x	x	x	C	C	C	B	B	B	x	x	W	x	x	x
23	Brad Singleton	x	x	x	x	x	x	x	x	B	B	x	x	x	B	B	B	L	L	L	L	L	P	x	x	B	P	L
24	Liam Hood	x	x	x	x	x	x	x	x	x	x	x	x	x	x	x	x	x	x	x	x	x	x	x	x	x	x	x
25	Joe Vickery	W			W	W	W	W	W				x	W	W	W									x	x	x	x
26	Liam Sutcliffe	x	x	x	x	x	x	x	x	x	x	x	x	B	L	B	B	SO	SO	SO	SO	SO	SO	SO	C	L	SO	B
27	Thomas Minns	x	x	x	x	x	x	x	x	x	x	x	x	x	x	x	W	B	C	x	x	x	x	x	x	x	x	x
28	Jordan Baldwinson	x	x	x	x	x	x	x	x	x	x	x	x	x	x	x	x	B	B	x	x	x	x	x	x	x	x	x
30	Alex Foster	x	x	x	x	x	x	x	x	x	x	x	x	x	x	x	x	x	x	B	B	B	B	B	B	B	B	x
31	Elliott Minchella	x	x	x	x	x	x	x	x	x	x	x	x	x	x	x	x	x	x	x	x	x	x	x	B	x	x	x
32	James Duckworth	x	x	x	x	x	x	x	x	x	x	x	x	x	x	x	x	x	x	x	x	x	W	x	x	W	x	x

= Injured

= Suspended

== Challenge Cup ==
LEGEND
Win
Draw
Loss

Date	Competition	Rnd	Vrs	H/A	Venue	Result	Score	Tries	Goals	Att	TV	Report
19/4/13	Cup	4th	Tigers	H	Headingley Stadium	W	28-12	Watkins, Burrow, Clarkson, McGuire (2)	Sinfield 4/5	8,130	-	Report
11/5/13	Cup	5th	Giants	A	Galpharm Stadium	L	8-24	Watkins (2)	Sinfield 0/2	11,389	BBC Sport	Report

== Player appearances ==
- Challenge Cup Games only

FB=Fullback	C=Centre	W=Winger	SO=Stand Off	SH=Scrum half	P=Prop	H=Hooker	SR=Second Row	L=Loose forward	B=Bench

No	Player	4	5
1	Zak Hardaker	FB	FB
2	Ben Jones-Bishop		
3	Kallum Watkins	W	W
4	Joel Moon	C	C
5	Ryan Hall	W	W
6	Danny McGuire	SO	SO
7	Rob Burrow	H	H
8	Kylie Leuluai	P	P
9	Paul McShane	B	B
10	Jamie Peacock	P	P
11	Jamie Jones-Buchanan	L	L
12	Carl Ablett	C	C
13	Kevin Sinfield	SH	SH
14	Stevie Ward	SR	
15	Brett Delaney	SR	SR
16	Ryan Bailey	Red card	B
17	Ian Kirke	B	B
18	Chris Clarkson	B	B
19	Mitch Achurch	B	SR
20	Darrell Griffin	x	x
21	Richard Moore	x	x
22	Jimmy Keinhorst	x	x
23	Brad Singleton	x	x
24	Liam Hood	x	x
25	Joe Vickery	x	x

== Playoffs ==
LEGEND
Win
Draw
Loss

Date	Competition	Rnd	Vrs	H/A	Venue	Result	Score	Tries	Goals	Att	TV	Report
14/9/13	Play-offs	QPO	Wolves	A	Halliwell Jones Stadium	L	20-40	Watkins, Sinfield, Hardaker (2)	Sinfield 2/4	8,695	Sky Sports	Report
20/9/13	Play-offs	PSF	Saints	H	Headingley Stadium	W	11-10	Watkins, Moon	Sinfield 1/2, McGuire 1 DG	12,189	Sky Sports	Report
27/9/13	Play-offs	SF	Warriors	A	DW Stadium	L	12-24	Moon, Sutcliffe	Sinfield 2/2	14,600	Sky Sports	Report

== Player appearances ==
- Play Off Games only

FB=Fullback	C=Centre	W=Winger	SO=Stand Off	SH=Scrum half	P=Prop	H=Hooker	SR=Second Row	L=Loose forward	B=Bench

No	Player	QPO	PSF	SF
1	Zak Hardaker	FB	FB	FB
2	Ben Jones-Bishop	W	W	W
3	Kallum Watkins	C	C	C
4	Joel Moon	C	C	C
5	Ryan Hall	W	W	W
6	Danny McGuire	SO	SO	SO
7	Rob Burrow	H	H	H
8	Kylie Leuluai	P	P	P
9	Paul McShane	x	x	x
10	Jamie Peacock	P	P	P
11	Jamie Jones-Buchanan	SR	SR	SR
12	Carl Ablett	SR	SR	SR
13	Kevin Sinfield	SO	SO	SO
14	Stevie Ward	x	x	x
15	Brett Delaney	B	L	x
16	Ryan Bailey	L	B	L
17	Ian Kirke	B	B	B
18	Chris Clarkson	x	x	B
19	Mitch Achurch	x	B	B
20	Darrell Griffin	x	x	x
21	Richard Moore	x	x	x
22	Jimmy Keinhorst	x	x	x
23	Brad Singleton	B	x	x
24	Liam Hood	x	x	x
25	Joe Vickery	x	x	x
26	Liam Sutcliffe	B	B	B
27	Thomas Minns	x	x	x
28	Jordan Baldwinson	x	x	x
30	Alex Foster	x	x	x
31	Elliot Minchella	x	x	x
32	James Duckworth	x	x	x

== 2013 squad statistics ==
- Appearances and points include Super League, Challenge Cup, Play Offs and WCC as of 28 September 2013.

No	Nat	Player	Position	Age	Previous club	Until End Of	Apps	Tries	Goals	DG	Points
1	(England)	Zak Hardaker	Fullback	21	Featherstone Rovers	2013	27	9	15	0	66
2	(England)	Ben Jones-Bishop	Wing	24	Leeds Rhinos	2013	14	9	0	0	36
3	(England)	Kallum Watkins	Centre	21	Leeds Rhinos	2013	29	20	0	0	80
4	(Australia)	Joel Moon	Centre	24	Salford City Reds	2013	30	17	0	0	68
5	(England)	Ryan Hall	Wing	25	Leeds Rhinos	2013	32	16	0	0	64
6	(England)	Danny McGuire	Stand off	30	Leeds Rhinos	2013	23	8	0	1	33
7	(England)	Rob Burrow	Scrum half	30	Leeds Rhinos	2013	32	8	2	0	36
8	(New Zealand)	Kylie Leuluai	Prop	34	Manly Sea Eagles	2013	25	1	0	0	4
9	(England)	Paul McShane	Hooker	23	Leeds Rhinos	2013	24	7	0	0	28
10	(England)	Jamie Peacock	Prop	35	Bradford Bulls	2013	29	3	0	0	12
11	(England)	Jamie Jones-Buchanan	Second row	31	Leeds Rhinos	2013	25	4	0	0	16
12	(England)	Carl Ablett	Second row	26	Leeds Rhinos	2013	28	5	0	0	20
13	(England)	Kevin Sinfield	Loose forward	32	Leeds Rhinos	2013	28	4	106	2	230
14	(England)	Stevie Ward	Scrum half	19	Leeds Rhinos	2013	11	1	0	0	4
15	(Australia)	Brett Delaney	Prop	27	Gold Coast Titans	2013	21	2	0	0	8
16	(England)	Ryan Bailey	Prop	29	Leeds Rhinos	2013	15	2	0	0	8
17	(England)	Ian Kirke	Second row	31	Dewsbury Rams	2013	32	2	0	0	8
18	(England)	Chris Clarkson	Loose forward	22	Leeds Rhinos	2013	26	2	0	0	8
19	(Australia)	Mitch Achurch	Prop	24	Penrith Panthers	2013	24	4	0	0	16
20	(England)	Darrell Griffin	Prop	31	Huddersfield Giants	2013	0	0	0	0	0
21	(England)	Richard Moore	Prop	32	Crusaders	2013	17	0	0	0	0
22	(Germany)	Jimmy Keinhorst	Centre	23	Leeds Rhinos	2013	9	3	0	0	12
23	(England)	Brad Singleton	Prop	20	Leeds Rhinos	2013	15	0	0	0	0
24	(England)	Liam Hood	Hooker	N/A	Leeds Rhinos	2013	0	0	0	0	0
25	(Australia)	Joe Vickery	Wing	23	Gold Coast Titans	2013	10	1	0	0	4
26	(England)	Liam Sutcliffe	Scrum half	18	Leeds Rhinos	2013	18	7	0	0	28
27	(England)	Thomas Minns	Wing	18	Leeds Rhinos	2013	3	1	0	0	4
28	(England)	Jordan Baldwinson	Loose forward	18	Leeds Rhinos	2013	2	0	0	0	0
30	(England)	Alex Foster	Second row	18	Leeds Rhinos	2013	8	1	0	0	4
31	(England)	Elliott Minchella	Loose forward	17	Leeds Rhinos	2013	1	1	0	0	4
32	(England)	James Duckworth	Wing	18	Leeds Rhinos	2013	2	1	0	0	4

= Injured = Suspended

== Out of contract 2013 ==
Players out of contract in 2013:

== 2013 transfers in/out ==
In

	Name	Position	Signed from	Date
(Australia)	Mitch Achurch	Prop	Penrith Panthers	August 2012
(England)	Liam McAvoy	Prop	Bradford Bulls	November 2012
(Australia)	Joel Moon	Centre	Salford City Reds	November 2012
(Australia)	Joe Vickery	Centre	Gold Coast Titans	December 2012

Out

	Name	Position	Club Signed	Date
(England)	Jay Pitts	Second row	Hull F.C.	March 2012
(England)	Lee Smith	Wing	Wakefield Trinity Wildcats	July 2012
(England)	Luke Ambler	Second row	Halifax	July 2012
(New Zealand)	Brent Webb	Fullback	Catalans Dragons	September 2012
(New Zealand)	Weller Hauraki	Second row	Castleford Tigers	September 2012
(England)	Kyle Amor	Prop	Wakefield Trinity Wildcats	September 2012
(England)				
