= 2020 Leeds Rhinos season =

- Super League Rank: 5
- Challenge Cup: Winners
- 2020 record: Wins: 11; draws: 0; losses: 5
- Points scored: For: 307; against: 278

Team information
- Chairman: (England) Paul Caddick
- Head Coach: (England) Richard Agar
- Captain: (England) Stevie Ward
- Stadium: Headingley; Leeds, United Kingdom
- Avg. attendance: 13,706
- Agg. attendance: 54,824
- High attendance: 19,500 (v Hull FC)
- Low attendance: 0

Top scorers
- Tries: (England) Ash Handley (12)
- Goals: (Papua New Guinea) Rhyse Martin (40)
- Points: (Papua New Guinea) Rhys Martin (84)
← 2019	2021 →

This article details the Leeds Rhinos's rugby league football club's 2020 season.

== Preseason friendlies ==
Date and time	Versus	H/A	Venue	Result	Score	Tries	Goals	Attendance	TV	Report
12 January; 15:00 (Note: Rob Burrow and Jamie Jones-Buchanan's testimonial match, featuring guest appearances by Ryan Bailey, Brett Delaney, Danny McGuire, Kylie Leuluai, Jamie Peacock, Keith Senior and Kevin Sinfield in the Leeds squad.)	Bradford Bulls	H	Headingley Rugby Stadium	W	34–10	Martin (2), L. Sutcliffe, Dwyer, McLelland, Myler	Martin (5/6)	19,560	Sky Sports Arena	

== Super League ==
Win Draw Loss

Date and time	Rnd	Home	Score	Away	Venue	Tries	Goals	Attendance
2 February, 19:45	1	Leeds Rhinos	4-30	Hull FC	Headingley	Handley		19,500
9 February, 15:00 (Note: Original Match on 9 February postponed, due to severe weather caused by Storm Ciara)	2	Huddersfield Giants	P-P	Leeds Rhinos	John Smiths Stadium			
14 February, 19:45	3	Leeds Rhinos	52-10	Hull KR	Headingley	Newman (2), Smith (2), Walker, Handley, Hurrell, Donaldson, Myler	Gale (8)	11,057
22 February, 14:00	4	Salford Red Devils	8-22	Leeds Rhinos	AJ Bell Stadium	Gale, L. Briscoe, Oledzki, Walker	Gale (3)	4,757
28 February, 19:45	5	Leeds Rhinos	36-0	Warrington Wolves	Headingley	Walker, Myler, Dwyer, Hurrell, Seumanufagai, Handley	Martin (6)	12,124
5 March, 19:45	6	Leeds Rhinos	66-12	Toronto Wolfpack	Headingley	Dwyer, Myler, Gale 2, Lui 2, Handley, Smith, Oledzki, Cuthbertson, Hurrell	Martin (11)	12,143
14 March 17:00 (Note: Game cancelled on 13 march, as Leeds decided that they won't be traveling to Perpignan, as one of the players had shown signs of pandemic of COVID-19 symptoms.)	7	Catalans Dragons	P-P	Leeds Rhinos	Stade Gilbert Brutus			
20 March, 19:45	8	Leeds Rhinos	P-P	St Helens	Headingley			
26 March, 19:45	9	Castleford Tigers	P-P	Leeds Rhinos	Mend-A-Hose Jungle			
9 April, 19:45	10	Leeds Rhinos		Wakefield Trinity	Headingley			
17 May, 19:45	11	Wigan Warriors		Leeds Rhinos	DW Stadium			
24 April, 19:45	12	Warrington Wolves		Leeds Rhinos	Halliwell Jones Stadium			
28 April, 19:45	2	Huddersfield Giants		Leeds Rhinos	John Smiths Stadium			
1 May, 19:45	13	Leeds Rhinos		Salford Red Devils	Headingley			
15 May, 19:45	14	Leeds Rhinos		Huddersfield Giants	Headingley			

=== Table ===
Pos	Team	Pld	W	D	L	PF	PA	PP	Pts	PCT	Qualification (Note: Where teams have the same win percentage, position is decided by points scored percentage (points scored divided by points conceded).)
1	Wigan Warriors (L)	17	13	0	4	408	278	146.8	26	76.47	Semi-finals
2	St Helens (C)	17	12	0	5	469	195	240.5	24	70.59	Semi-finals
3	Warrington Wolves (Note: Salford forfeited a game against Warrington. Under RFL operational rules, the game is recorded as a 24–0 victory for Warrington and converse loss for Salford with the points scored/conceded applying to both teams.)	17	12	0	5	365	204	178.9	24	70.59	Elimination semi-finals
4	Catalans Dragons	13	8	0	5	376	259	145.2	16	61.54	Elimination semi-finals
5	Leeds Rhinos	17	10	0	7	369	390	94.6	20	58.82	Elimination semi-finals
6	Hull F.C.	17	9	0	8	405	436	92.9	18	52.94	Elimination semi-finals
7	Huddersfield Giants (Note: Huddersfield were placed on standby to take the place of any of the four teams in the elimination finals should one be unable to fulfil their fixture.)	18	7	0	11	318	367	86.6	14	38.89	
8	Castleford Tigers	16	6	0	10	328	379	86.5	12	37.50	
9	Salford Red Devils	18	8	0	10	354	469	75.5	10 (Note: Salford deducted 3 wins by the Rugby Football League for failing to meet the terms of a financial commitment agreed in 2013.)	27.78	
10	Wakefield Trinity	19	5	0	14	324	503	64.4	10	26.32	
11	Hull Kingston Rovers	17	3	0	14	290	526	55.1	6	17.65	

Source: BBC Sport
Rules for classification: 1) Points; 2) Points difference; 3) Number of points scored;
(C) Champions; (L) League Leaders' Shield Winners

== Challenge Cup ==
Win Draw Loss

Date and time	Rnd	Versus	H/A	Venue	Result	Score	Tries	Goals	Attendance
18 September, 20:15	QF	Hull KR	N	Totally Wicked Stadium	W	48–18	Seumanufagai, Handley, L.Briscoe, Newman, Leeming (2), T.Briscoe, Martin	Martin (8)	—N/a
3 October, 14:30	SF	Wigan Warriors	N	Totally Wicked Stadium	W	26–12	Martin, Handley (2), T. Briscoe	Martin (5)	—N/a
17 October, 15:00	F	Salford Red Devils	N	Wembley Stadium	W	17–16	T. Briscoe, Handley (2)	Martin (2), Gale DG	—N/a

== Squad ==
Leeds Rhinos 2020 Squad
First team squad			Coaching staff
1 (England) Jack Walker – FB; 2 (England) Tom Briscoe – WG; 3 (England) Harry Newman – CE, WG; 4 (Tonga) Konrad Hurrell – CE; 5 (England) Ash Handley – WG, CE; 6 (Australia) Robert Lui – SO; 7 (England) Luke Gale – HK, SH, SO (vc); 8 (New Zealand) Ava Seumanufagai – PR; 9 (England) Kruise Leeming – HK; 10 (Australia) Matt Prior – CE, PR, SR; 11 (England) Alex Mellor – SR; 12 (Papua New Guinea) Rhyse Martin – SR; 13 (England) Stevie Ward – LF, SR (C)	14 (England) Brad Dwyer – HK; 15 (England) Liam Sutcliffe – CE, FB, LF, SO; 16 (England) Richie Myler – SH; 17 (Australia) Adam Cuthbertson – LF, PR, SR; 18 (England) Dom Crosby – PR; 19 (Poland) Mikolaj Olędzki – PR; 20; 21 (England) Rhys Evans – CE, FB, WG; 22 (England) Cameron Smith – SR, LF; 23 (England) Callum McLelland – SH, SO; 24 (England) Luke Briscoe – FB, CE, WG; 25 (England) James Donaldson – LF, SR; 26 (England) Alex Sutcliffe – CE	27 (England) Sam Walters; 28 (England) Tom Holroyd – PR; 29 (England) Corey Johnson – HK; 30 (England) Muizz Mustapha – SR, LF; 31 (England) Daniel Waite-Pullan – SR; 32 (England) Tyler Dupree – PR; 33 (England) Jarrod O'Connor; 34 (England) Jack Broadbent; 35 (Papua New Guinea) Wellington Albert – PR, LF; 36 (England) Corey Hall; 37 (England) Joe Greenwood – SR	Head coach: Richard Agar; Assistant coach: Chev Walker; Legend: (c) Captain(s); (vc) Vice-captain(s); Updated: 6 December 2019; Source(s): 2020 Squad Numbers

== Transfers ==
Gains

player	Club	Contract	Date
Ava Seumanufagai	Cronulla Sharks	2 1/2 Years	April 2019
Rhyse Martin	Canterbury-Bankstown Bulldogs	2 1/2 years	June 2019
Robert Lui	Salford Red Devils	2 years	June 2019
Alex Mellor	Huddersfield Giants	3 years	June 2019
Luke Gale	Castleford Tigers	3 years	June 2019
Kruise Leeming	Huddersfield Giants	2 years	November 2019
Matt Prior	Cronulla Sharks	2 years	November 2019

Losses

player	Club	Contract	Date
Kallum Watkins	Gold Coast Titans	2 1/2 Years	June 2019
Tui Lolohea	Salford Red Devils	2 years	June 2019
Shaun Lunt	Released	N/A	N/A
Jamie Jones-Buchanan	Retired	N/A	N/A
Ashton Golding	Huddersfield Giants	3 years	October 2019
Matt Parcell	Hull Kingston Rovers	1 year	October 2019
Sam Moorhouse	Dewsbury Rams	1 year	October 2019
Nathaniel Peteru	Released	N/A	N/A
Brett Ferres	Featherstone Rovers	1 year	November 2019
Brad Singleton	Toronto Wolfpack	N/A	November 2019
Owen Trout	Huddersfield Giants	4 years	November 2019
Trent Merrin	St. George Illawarra Dragons	2 Years	November 2019
Dan Waite-Pullan	Bradford Bulls	1 year	January 2020

== Player statistics ==
#	Player	Position	Tries	Goals	DG	Points	Red Cards	Yellow Cards
1	Jack Walker	Fullback	3	0	0	12	0	0
2	Tom Briscoe	Wing	0	0	0	0	0	0
3	Harry Newman	Wing	2	0	0	4	0	0
4	Konrad Hurrell	Centre	3	0	0	12	0	0
5	Ash Handley	Centre	4	0	0	16	0	0
6	Robert Lui	Stand-off	2	0	0	8	0	0
7	Luke Gale	Hooker	3	0	11	34	0	0
8	Ava Seumanufagai	Prop	1	0	0	4	0	0
9	Kruise Leeming	Hooker	0	0	0	0	0	0
10	Matt Prior	Centre	0	0	0	0	0	0
11	Alex Mellor	Second-row	0	0	0	0	0	0
12	Rhyse Martin	Second-row	0	17	0	34	0	0
13	Stevie Ward	Loose forward	0	0	0	0	0	0
14	Brad Dwyer	Hooker	2	0	0	8	0	0
15	Liam Sutcliffe	Centre	0	0	0	0	0	0
16	Richie Myler	Scrum-half	3	0	0	12	0	0
17	Adam Cuthbertson	Loose forward	1	0	0	4	0	0
18	Dom Crosby	Prop	0	0	0	0	0	0
19	Mikolaj Olędzki	Prop	2	0	0	8	0	0
21	Rhys Evans	Wing	0	0	0	0	0	0
22	Cameron Smith	Second-row	3	0	0	12	0	0
23	Callum McLelland	Scrum-half	0	0	0	0	0	0
24	Luke Briscoe	Centre	1	0	0	4	0	0
25	James Donaldson	Loose forward	1	0	0	4	0	0
26	Alex Sutcliffe	Centre	0	0	0	0	0	0
27	Sam Walters	Centre	0	0	0	0	0	0
28	Tom Holroyd	Prop	0	0	0	0	0	0
29	Corey Johnson	Hooker	0	0	0	0	0	0
30	Muizz Mustapha	Loose forward	0	0	0	0	0	0
31	Daniel Waite-Pullan	Second-row	0	0	0	0	0	0
32	Tyler Dupree	Prop	0	0	0	0	0	0
33	Jarrod O'Connor	Wing	0	0	0	0	0	0
34	Jack Broadbent	Centre	0	0	0	0	0	0
35	Wellington Albert	Loose forward	0	0	0	0	0	0
37	Joe Greenwood	Second-row	0	0	0	0	0	0

- Updated to matches played on 5 March 2020
