= List of Leeds Rhinos seasons =

Leeds Rhinos is an English professional rugby league club based in Leeds, West Yorkshire.

This list details the club's achievements in all competitions for each season.

== Super League ==
| Season | League | | | | | | | | | Play-offs (Note: From 1906 until 1973 (except for two seasons between 1962 and 1964) a play-off format was used to determine the overall league champions. Between 1973 and 1997, the championship was awarded to the league winners, and the play-offs were replaced by the Rugby League Premiership. A play-off system for the championship was reinstated in 1998.) | Challenge Cup | Other competitions | |
| Season | Division | P | W | D | L | F | A | Pts (Note: Win Percentage for 2020 and 2021) | Pos | Play-offs | Challenge Cup | Other competitions | |
|---|---|---|---|---|---|---|---|---|---|---|---|---|---|
| 1996 | Super League | 22 | 6 | 0 | 16 | 555 | 745 | 12 | 10th | | SF | | |
| 1997 | Super League | 22 | 13 | 1 | 8 | 544 | 463 | 27 | 5th | | SF | Premiership | QF |
| 1997 | Super League | 22 | 13 | 1 | 8 | 544 | 463 | 27 | 5th | | SF | World Club Challenge | Grp |
| 1998 | Super League | 23 | 19 | 0 | 4 | 662 | 369 | 38 | 2nd | RU | R4 | | |
| 1999 | Super League | 30 | 22 | 1 | 7 | 910 | 558 | 45 | 3rd | SF | W | | |
| 2000 | Super League | 28 | 17 | 0 | 11 | 692 | 626 | 34 | 4th | SF | RU | | |
| 2001 | Super League | 28 | 16 | 1 | 11 | 774 | 721 | 33 | 5th | EPO | SF | | |
| 2002 | Super League | 28 | 17 | 0 | 11 | 865 | 700 | 34 | 4th | SF | SF | | |
| 2003 | Super League | 28 | 19 | 3 | 6 | 751 | 555 | 41 | 2nd | EF | RU | | |
| 2004 | Super League | 28 | 24 | 2 | 2 | 1037 | 443 | 50 | 1st | W | R5 | | |
| 2005 | Super League | 28 | 22 | 0 | 6 | 1150 | 505 | 44 | 2nd | RU | RU | World Club Challenge | W |
| 2006 | Super League | 28 | 19 | 0 | 9 | 869 | 543 | 38 | 3rd | EPO | SF | | |
| 2007 | Super League | 27 | 18 | 1 | 8 | 747 | 487 | 37 | 2nd | W | R5 | | |
| 2008 | Super League | 27 | 21 | 0 | 6 | 863 | 413 | 42 | 2nd | W | SF | World Club Challenge | W |
| 2009 | Super League | 27 | 21 | 0 | 6 | 805 | 453 | 42 | 1st | W | R4 | World Club Challenge | RU |
| 2010 | Super League | 27 | 17 | 1 | 9 | 725 | 561 | 35 | 4th | QSF | RU | World Club Challenge | RU |
| 2011 | Super League | 27 | 15 | 1 | 11 | 757 | 603 | 31 | 5th | W | RU | | |
| 2012 | Super League | 27 | 16 | 0 | 11 | 823 | 662 | 32 | 5th | W | RU | World Club Challenge | W |
| 2013 | Super League | 27 | 18 | 1 | 8 | 712 | 507 | 37 | 3rd | QSF | R5 | World Club Challenge | RU |
| 2014 | Super League | 27 | 15 | 2 | 10 | 685 | 421 | 32 | 6th | QPO | W | | |
| 2015 | Super League | 30 | 20 | 1 | 9 | 944 | 650 | 41 | 1st | W | W | | |
| 2016 | Super League | 23 | 8 | 0 | 15 | 404 | 576 | 16 | 9th | DNQ | R6 | World Club Challenge | RU |
| 2016 | Super League | 23 | 8 | 0 | 15 | 404 | 576 | 16 | 9th | DNQ | R6 | The Qualifiers | 1st |
| 2017 | Super League | 30 | 20 | 0 | 10 | 749 | 623 | 40 | 2nd | W | SF | | |
| 2018 | Super League | 23 | 8 | 2 | 13 | 441 | 527 | 18 | 9th | DNQ | SF | World Club Challenge | RU |
| 2018 | Super League | 23 | 8 | 2 | 13 | 441 | 527 | 18 | 9th | DNQ | SF | The Qualifiers | 2nd |
| 2019 | Super League | 29 | 12 | 0 | 17 | 650 | 644 | 24 | 8th | DNQ | R6 | | |
| 2020 | Super League | 17 | 10 | 0 | 7 | 369 | 390 | 58.82 | 5th | EPO | W | | |
| 2021 | Super League | 24 | 13 | 0 | 11 | 556 | 440 | 54.17 | 5th | SF | R6 (Note: Officially round 3 due to the competitions temporary restructure in 2021.) | | |
| 2022 | Super League | 27 | 14 | 1 | 12 | 577 | 528 | 29 | 5th | RU | R6 | | |
| 2023 | Super League | 27 | 12 | 0 | 15 | 535 | 534 | 24 | 8th | DNQ | R6 | | |
| 2024 | Super League | 27 | 14 | 0 | 13 | 530 | 488 | 28 | 8th | DNQ | R6 | | |
| 2025 | Super League | 27 | 18 | 0 | 9 | 610 | 310 | 36 | 4th | EOP | R4 | | |
| 2026 | Super League | 27 | 20 | 0 | 7 | 904 | 426 | 40 | 2nd | SF | R4 | | |

== Key ==
| Winners | Runners-up | Third place |

== Bibliography ==
- "Rugby League Hall of Fame". Archived from the original on 13 May 2008.
- "Leeds Rhinos - Seasons". Rugby League Project. Shawn Dollin, Andrew Ferguson and Bill Bates.
