= Alex Foster (rugby league) =

English rugby league footballer

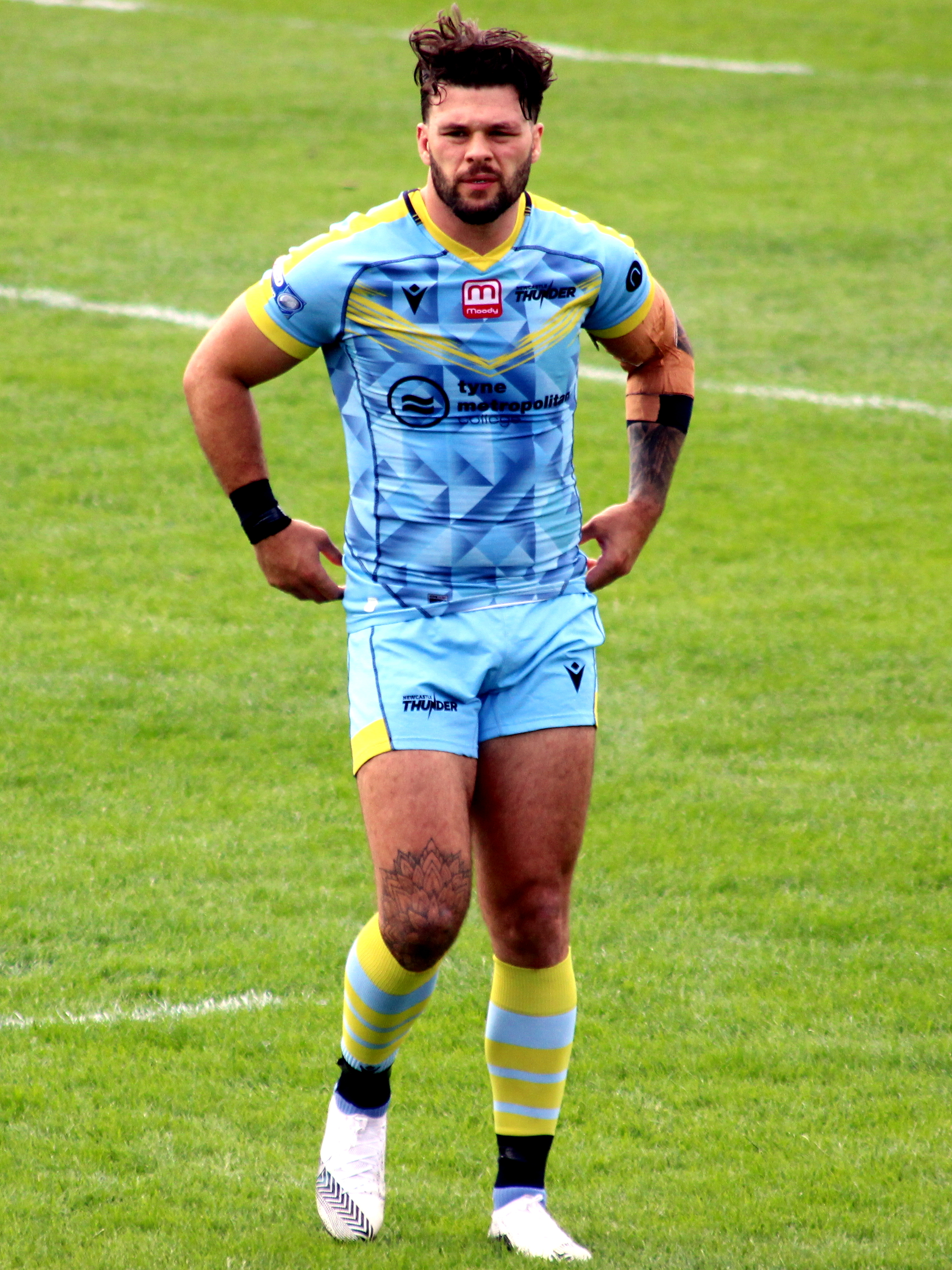

Personal information
- Full name: Alex Foster
- Born: 25 September 1993 (age 33) Gloucester, Gloucestershire, England
- Height: 6 ft 1 in (1.85 m)
- Weight: 15 st 6 lb (98 kg)

Playing information
- Position: Second-row, Centre, Loose forward
Club
Years	Team	Pld	T	G	FG	P
2013–15	Leeds Rhinos	8	1	0	0	4
2013(DR)	→ Hunslet Hawks	1	0	0	0	0
2014(loan)	→ London Broncos	21	3	0	0	12
2015(loan)	→ Featherstone Rovers	27	9	0	0	36
2016	London Broncos	20	11	0	0	44
2017–21	Castleford Tigers	62	10	0	0	40
2017(DR)	→ Oxford	1	0	0	0	0
2018(DR)	→ Halifax	1	0	0	0	0
2022–23	Newcastle Thunder	27	6	0	0	24
2023(loan)	→ Castleford Tigers	6	2	0	0	8
2024–	Sheffield Eagles	35	7	0	0	28
	Total	209	49	0	0	196
- Source: As of 21 July 2024

Alex Foster (born 25 September 1993) is an English professional rugby league footballer who last played as a second-row, loose forward or centre for Sheffield Eagles in the RFL Championship.

He has previously played for the Leeds Rhinos in the Super League, and on loan from Leeds at the Hunslet Hawks, London Broncos and Featherstone Rovers. He played one season for the London Broncos in the Championship before returning to the Super League with the Castleford Tigers, where he spent the longest spell of his career. He appeared on dual registration from Castleford at Oxford and Halifax. He played for Newcastle Thunder in the Championship and was appointed club captain, before re-joining the Castleford Tigers on loan.

== Background ==
Foster was born in Gloucester, Gloucestershire, England.

Foster played junior rugby league for Wetherby Bulldogs before joining the Leeds Rhinos academy system.

== Playing career ==
=== Leeds Rhinos ===
On 30 June 2013, Foster made his Super League début for the Leeds Rhinos against the Widnes Vikings. He scored his first Super League try against the London Broncos on 1 August, and made a total 8 appearances throughout the season. In November 2013, he signed a three-year deal with Leeds.

==== Hunslet Hawks (dual registration) ====
In July 2013, Foster played one game for the Hunslet Hawks in the Championship on dual registration from Leeds.

==== London Broncos (loan) ====
In January 2014, Foster signed a season-long loan deal with the London Broncos alongside fellow Rhinos youngsters Thomas Minns and James Duckworth. During the season, he played as a second-row or loose forward alongside Matt Cook and Mike McMeeken. Foster scored his first try for the Broncos against the Huddersfield Giants on 10 May. On 25 May, Foster scored two tries against Hull Kingston Rovers in a 48–16 defeat at Craven Park. He made 21 appearances in total, while London were relegated to the Championship.

==== Featherstone Rovers (loan) ====
In November 2014, Featherstone Rovers announced the signing of Foster on a season-long loan for 2015, alongside three other young Leeds players.

=== London Broncos ===
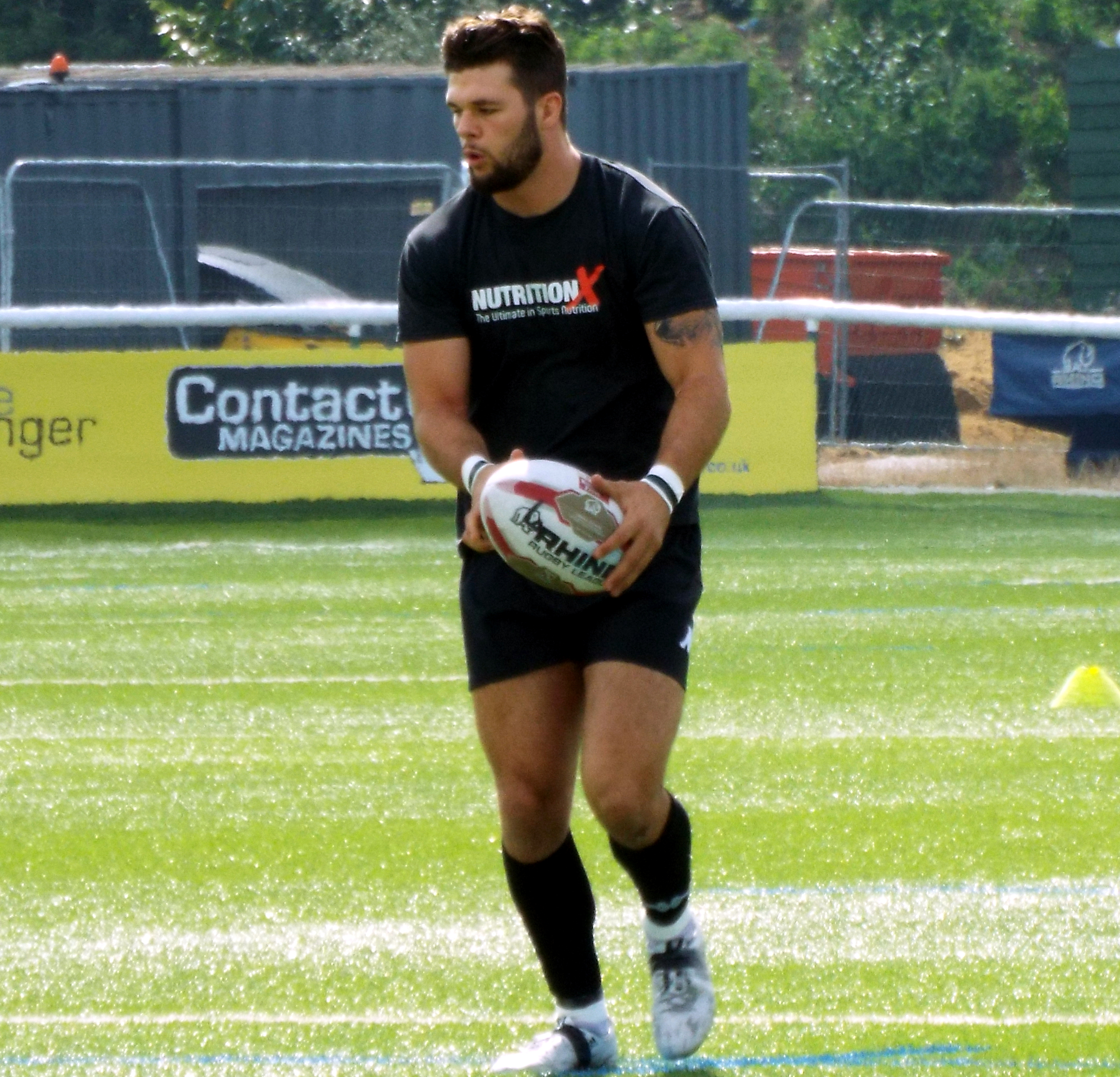
Foster warming up for the London Broncos in 2016

After a spell with Featherstone Rovers, Foster signed for London on a two-year deal. Injury meant that he was restricted to 20 appearances for the Broncos.

=== Bradford Bulls ===
In 2017, Foster agreed a deal with Bradford however the club went into liquidation and Foster was released.

=== Castleford Tigers ===
In February 2017, Castleford head coach Daryl Powell confirmed that Foster had been offered a trial with the view of a two-year deal at the end of the trial. In April, it was confirmed Foster signed a deal until the end of the season with Cas and was given the number 34 shirt. In July, it was confirmed that Foster had signed a new deal. On signing the new deal, he said, "I'm over the moon to sign here for another two years. It's a great place to be." Foster was a replacement for Cas in the 2017 Grand Final and scored their only try of the game, becoming the first Castleford player to score in a Super League Grand Final.

Foster demonstrated his positional versatility in 2018, starting at loose forward, second row and centre at different points throughout the season. He was rewarded for his impressive form in June with a new three-and-a-half-year contract. However, in July, Foster was ruled out for the remainder of the season due to a foot injury.

In the 2019 season, Foster made six appearances and scored one try. His playtime was limited by a knee injury sustained in March, for which he underwent surgery later in the year.

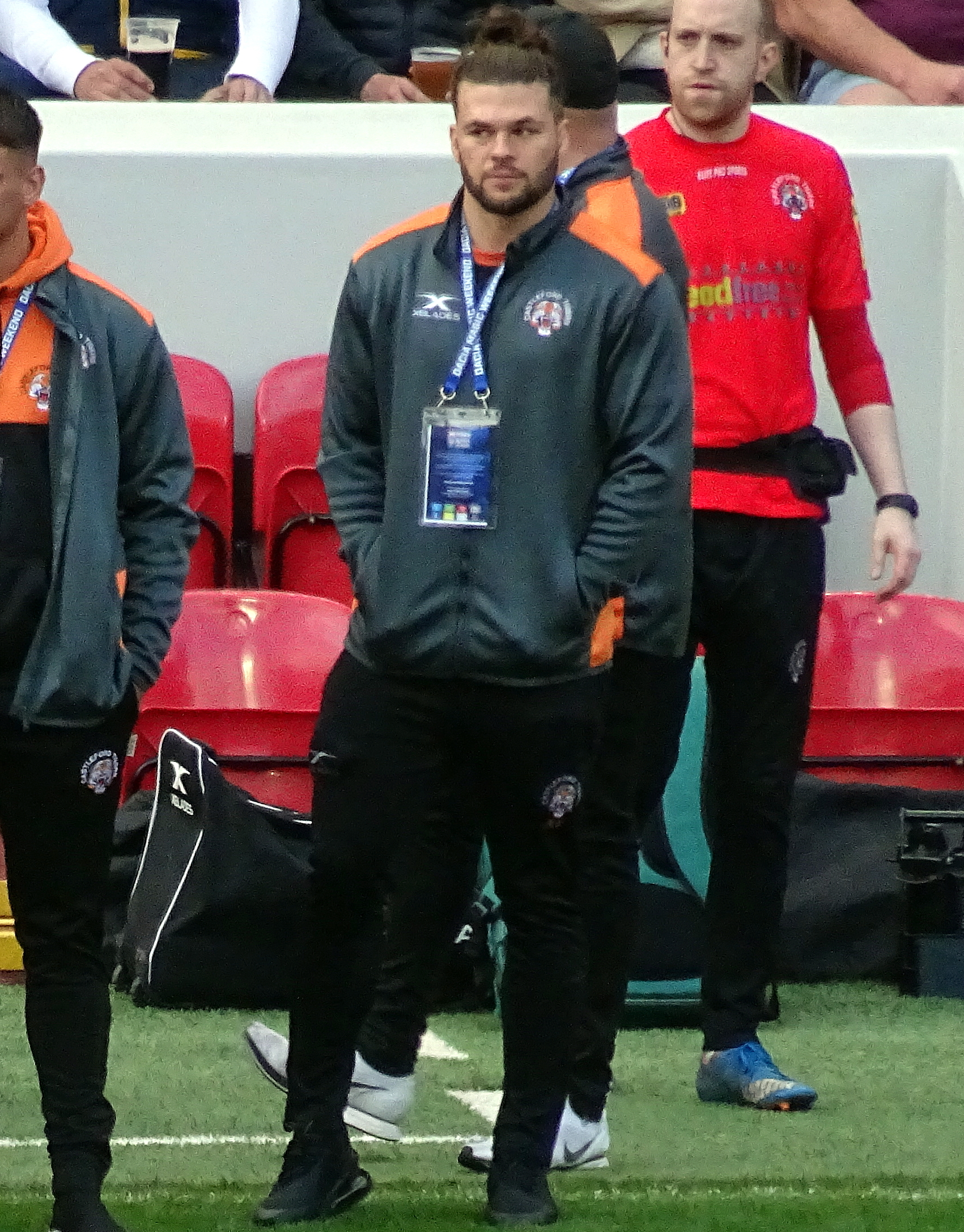
Foster pre-game for the Castleford Tigers in 2019

Foster made his return to the team following the 2020 season's COVID-19 suspension, after spending 16 months on the sidelines. In the remainder of the season, he made 8 appearances and scored 1 try.

Foster sustained a bicep injury in a pre-season friendly against Hull KR in March 2021. He made his first appearance of the year in Castleford's Challenge Cup semi-final against Warrington on 5 June. On 17 July 2021, he played for Castleford in their 2021 Challenge Cup Final loss against St. Helens. In September, it was announced that he would leave the club at the end of the 2021 season upon the expiry of his contract. Speaking about his time at Castleford, Foster said, "It has been one hell of a journey and I am so thankful to everyone involved, from the coaching staff to the fans, my teammates as well who have made my time here what it has been for me."

=== Newcastle Thunder ===
On 17 October 2021, it was reported that he had signed for Newcastle Thunder in the RFL Championship on a two-year deal. He made his first appearance and scored his first try for the club against Workington on 30 January.

==== Castleford Tigers (loan) ====
In July 2023, Castleford Tigers announced the return of Foster, signing on a season-long loan from Newcastle, alongside Greece international Billy Tsikrikas.

=== Sheffield Eagles ===
On 14 November 2023 it was reported that he had signed for Sheffield Eagles in the RFL Championship on a two-year deal.

== Club statistics ==
Appearances and points in all competitions by year
Club	Season	Tier	App	T	G	DG	Pts
Leeds Rhinos	2013	Super League	8	1	0	0	4
→ Hunslet Hawks (DR)	2013	Championship	1	0	0	0	0
→ Featherstone Rovers (loan)	2015	Championship	27	9	0	0	36
London Broncos	2014 (Note: On loan from Leeds in 2014 before joining permanently in 2016)	Super League	21	3	0	0	12
London Broncos	2016	Championship	20	11	0	0	44
London Broncos	Total		41	14	0	0	56
Castleford Tigers	2017	Super League	19	2	0	0	8
Castleford Tigers	2018	Super League	16	5	0	0	20
Castleford Tigers	2019	Super League	6	1	0	0	4
Castleford Tigers	2020	Super League	8	1	0	0	4
Castleford Tigers	2021	Super League	13	1	0	0	4
Castleford Tigers	2023 (Note: Rejoined on loan from Newcastle in 2023)	Super League	6	2	0	0	8
Castleford Tigers	Total		68	12	0	0	48
→ Oxford (DR)	2017	League 1	1	0	0	0	0
→ Halifax (DR)	2018	Championship	1	0	0	0	0
Newcastle Thunder	2022	Championship	12	3	0	0	12
Newcastle Thunder	2023	Championship	15	3	0	0	12
Newcastle Thunder	Total		27	6	0	0	24
Sheffield Eagles	2024	Championship	17	0	0	0	0
Career total			191	42	0	0	168

As of match played 21 July 2024
