= 2013 World Club Challenge =

Intercontinental rugby league match

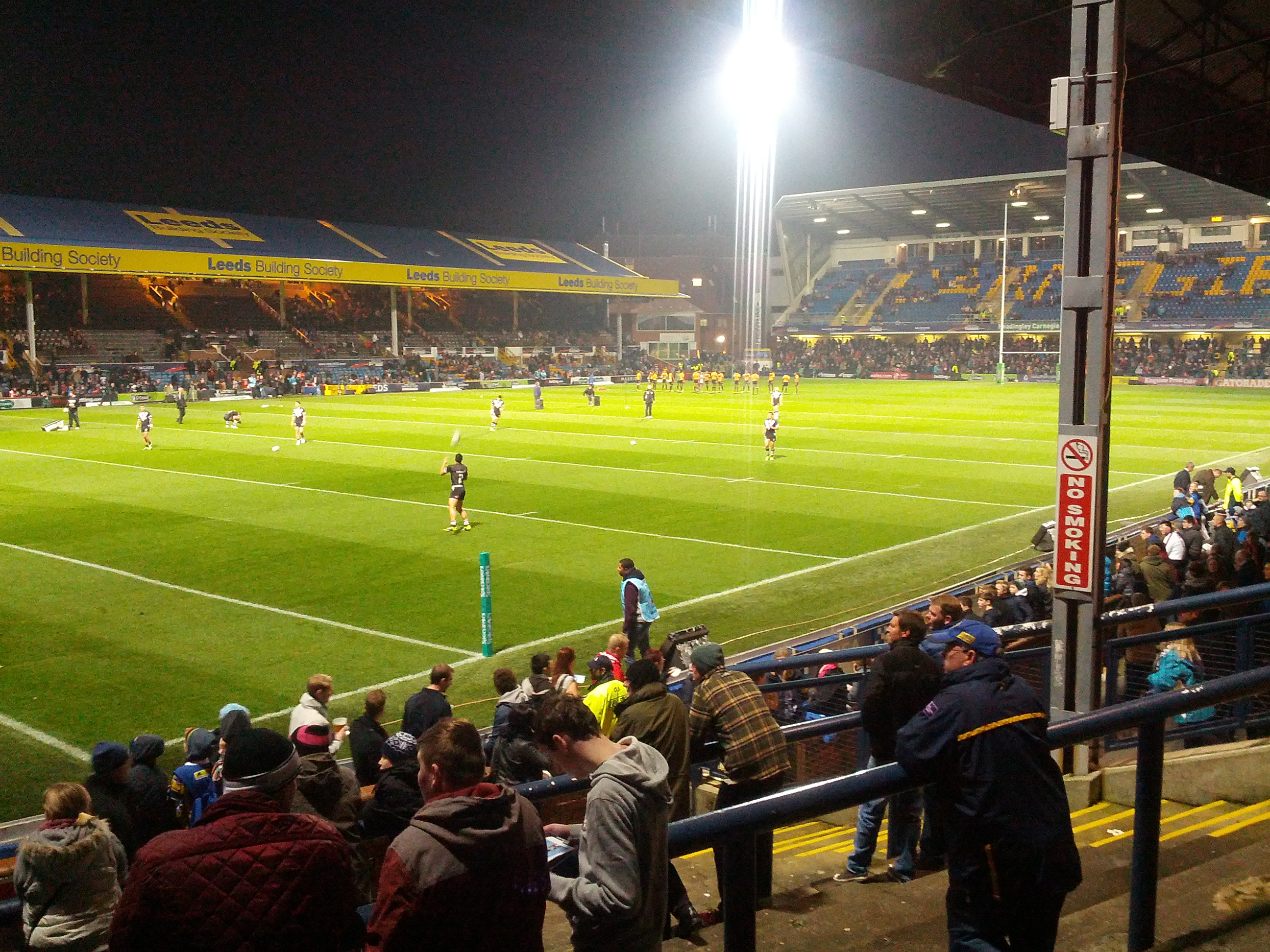
- Headingley hosted the match
Leeds Rhinos	Melbourne Storm
(Super League)	(National Rugby League)
14	18
	1	2	Total
LEE	8	6	14
MEL	8	10	18
- Date: 22 February 2013
- Stadium: Headingley
- Location: Leeds, England
- Man of the Match: Cooper Cronk
- Referee: Ben Thaler
- Attendance: 20,400

Broadcast partners
- Broadcasters: (United Kingdom) Sky Sports (Live); (Australia) Fox Sports (Delay); (Australia) Nine Network:GEM (Live); (New Zealand) Māori Television (Live)
- Commentators: Eddie Hemmings; Mike Stephenson; Phil Clarke

The 2013 World Club Challenge (PROBIZ World Club Challenge for sponsorship purposes) was the fourteenth consecutive annual World Club Challenge and was contested by Super League XVII champions, Leeds Rhinos and 2012 NRL Premiers, the Melbourne Storm. It took place on Friday 22 February at 8pm GMT (Saturday 23 February 7:00am AEDST). Melbourne prevailed after a hard-fought contest 18-14.

== Background ==
2013's match was third time ever that these two clubs have played each other, with Leeds having won the 2008 World Club Challenge, and Melbourne winning, and subsequently being stripped of, the 2010 World Club Challenge title.

On 19 February the World Club Challenge was officially announced as a sellout with all 20,400 tickets sold. In addition the referees for the match were also announced, with Ben Thaler to take charge of the game.

=== Leeds Rhinos ===
Leeds finished Super League XVII's regular season in 5th place and went on to defeat 2nd-placed Warrington Wolves 26-18 in the grand final, qualifying the Rhinos for their second World Club Challenge in succession and 6th overall.

=== Melbourne Storm ===
The Storm finished the 2012 NRL season in 2nd place and went on to defeat the 1st-placed Canterbury-Bankstown Bulldogs 14 - 4 in the grand final, qualifying Melbourne for their fourth World Club Challenge, and first since 2010.

The Storm unveiled their special one-off jersey designed especially for the World Cup Challenge in December 2012 The design resembles the club’s away jersey with its predominantly white body but also includes the iconic purple V' that continues to represent the club’s Victorian heritage.

On 10 February 2013, the Melbourne Storm announced the 21-man Squad that will make the trip to London for the World Club Challenge, the team is as follows: Kenny Bromwich, Jesse Bromwich, Will Chambers, Cooper Cronk, Brett Finch, Mahe Fonua, Ben Hampton, Tohu Harris, Ryan Hinchcliffe, Ryan Hoffman, Junior Moors, Bryan Norrie, Justin O’Neill, Jason Ryles, Junior Sa’u, Lagi Setu, Billy Slater, Cameron Smith (capt), Siosaia Vave, Sisa Waqa, Gareth Widdop.

On 20 February 2013 the above squad was trimmed to 19 players with the official announcement of the team. Two interchange players were further cut when the final team was announced on the Friday before the game, final teams listed below.

== Teams ==
Team details
Leeds Rhinos		Position	Melbourne Storm
Name	Number	Position	Number	Name
Kallum Watkins	3	FB	1	Billy Slater
Joe Vickery	25	WG	2	Sisa Waqa
Carl Ablett	12	CE	3	Will Chambers
Joel Moon	4	CE	4	Justin O'Neill
Ryan Hall	5	WG	5	Mahe Fonua
Kevin Sinfield (c)	13	SO/FE	6	Gareth Widdop
Danny McGuire	6	SH/HB	7	Cooper Cronk
Kylie Leuluai	8	PR	8	Jesse Bromwich
Rob Burrow	7	HK	9	Cameron Smith (c)
Jamie Peacock	10	PF	10	Bryan Norrie
Stevie Ward	14	SR	11	Tohu Harris
Brett Delaney	15	SR	12	Ryan Hoffman
Jamie Jones-Buchanan	11	LF/LK	13	Ryan Hinchcliffe
Ian Kirke	17	IN	15	Jason Ryles
Paul McShane	9	IN	16	Siosaia Vave
Chris Clarkson	18	IN	17	Junior Moors
Mitch Achurch	19	IN	18	Lagi Setu
(England) Brian McDermott		Coach		(Australia) Craig Bellamy

== Match details ==
2013 World Club Challenge

22 February 2013
20:00 GMT (UTC+0)

Leeds Rhinos	14 – 18	Melbourne Storm
Tries: 2 Hall 29'; Jones-Buchanan 53' Goals: 3 Sinfield 30', pen 40', 54' (3/3)	1st: 8–8; 2nd: 6–10; Report	Tries: 3 Slater 20'; J Bromwich 43'; Harris 47'; Goals: 3 Smith pen 12', 20', 44' (3/4)

Headingley Carnegie Stadium, Leeds
Attendance: 20,400
Referee: Ben Thaler (England)
Player of the Match: Cooper Cronk (Melbourne)

=== First half ===
The match was a close, hard-fought contest throughout. Melbourne opened the scoring with an early penalty goal. A slick pass from half back, Cooper Cronk led to fullback Billy Slater scoring the first try of the match in the 20th minute. Cameron Smith kicked the conversion, making the score 8–0. A last-tackle attacking raid in the 29th minute put Leeds winger Ryan Hall over in the left corner. Kevin Sinfield converted the goal and soon added another penalty goal to tie the game at 8–8 at half time.

=== Second half ===
Storm prop Jesse Bromwich trundled up the ball in the 44th minute and beat four defenders to score a try next to the posts, with Smith converting, to lead the game 14–8. A 50-metre movement finished with Tohu Harris racing into the clear, passing to Will Chambers with winger Sisa Waqa hemmed in by defence on the right side. Waqa found Chambers in support and the rookie Harris dived over for the try of the match. Down 18-8, Leeds captain, Sinfield kicked to the left, Ryan Hall claimed the ball and passed to Joel Moon. The centre then passed infield to second rower Jamie Jones-Buchanan who scored. With 10 minutes left, the Storm appeared to have wrapped up victory when winger Mahe Fonua scored, but referee Ben Thaler ruled forward the final pass from centre Justin O'Neill. Leeds repeatedly attacked Storm's forward line in the final minutes, but failed to capitalise, with Storm winning a close contest 18–14. Storm half back, Cooper Cronk was awarded the Man of the Match.
