= 2017 Super League Grand Final =

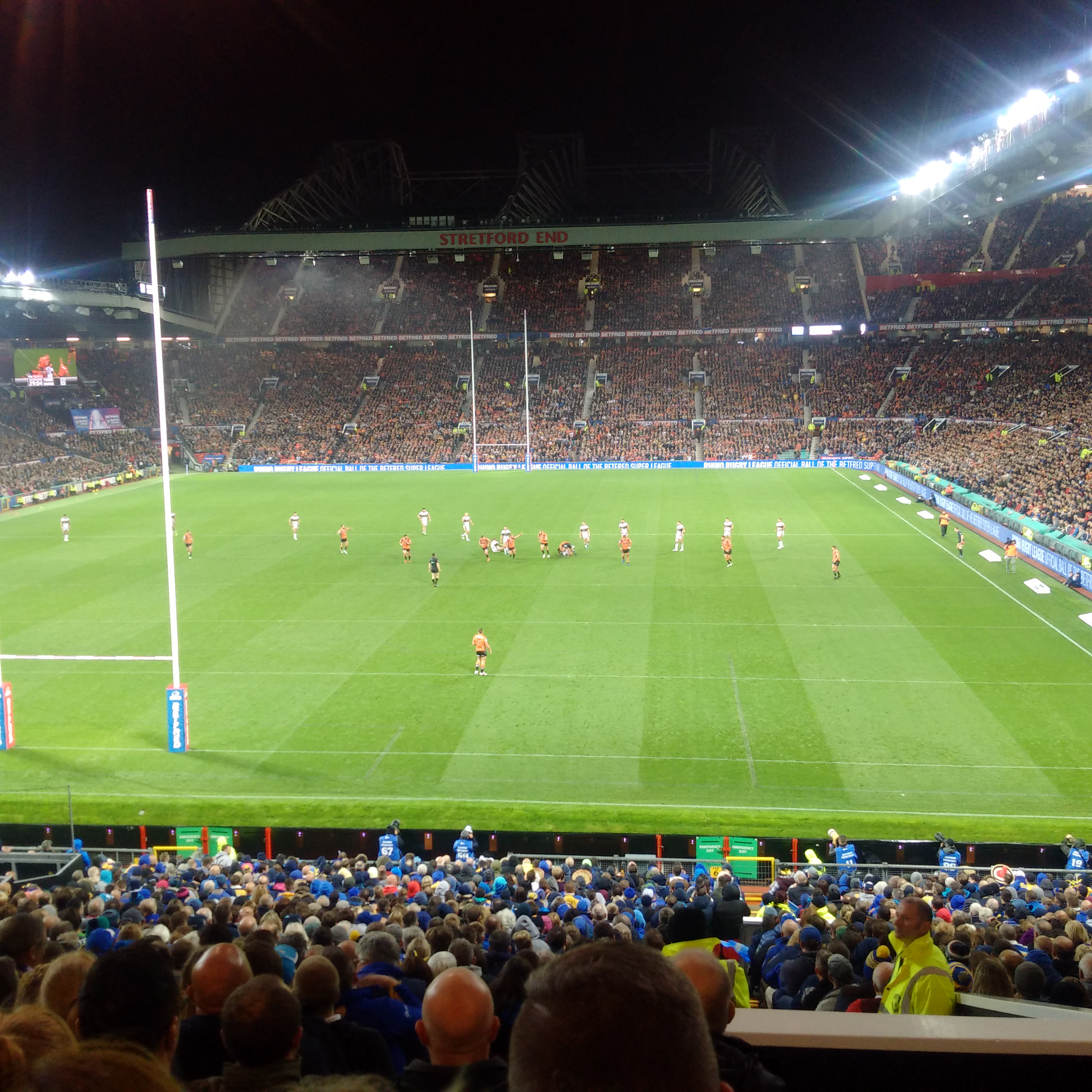
- A view of Old Trafford during the match
Castleford Tigers	Leeds Rhinos
6	24
	1	2	Total
CAS	0	6	6
LEE	7	17	24
- Date: 7 October 2017
- Stadium: Old Trafford
- Location: (England) Manchester
- Harry Sunderland Trophy: (England) Danny McGuire ( Leeds Rhinos)
- Headliners: Razorlight
- Referee: James Child
- Attendance: 72,827

Broadcast partners
- Broadcasters: Sky Sports

The 2017 Super League Grand Final was the 20th official grand final championship-deciding game of the Super League XXII. It was held at Old Trafford, Manchester on 7 October 2017, kick off 18.00. Leeds Rhinos became champions for a record 8th time after beating Castleford Tigers 24–6 in front of a sell out crowd of 72,827.

== Background ==
Pos	Team	Pld	W	D	L	PF	PA	PD	Pts
1	Castleford Tigers	30	25	0	5	965	536	+429	50
2	Leeds Rhinos	30	20	0	10	749	623	+126	40

=== Route to Final ===
==== Castleford Tigers ====
Finishing top of the table in the regular season, Castleford qualified directly to the play-off semi-final where they met St Helens at home. The game went to golden point extra time before a Luke Gale drop goal gave Castleford the win 23–22.

==== Leeds Rhinos ====
Leeds also had direct qualification to the semi-final where they hosted Hull F.C. at Headingley. In another close game it was Leeds who triumphed 18–16.

== Match details ==
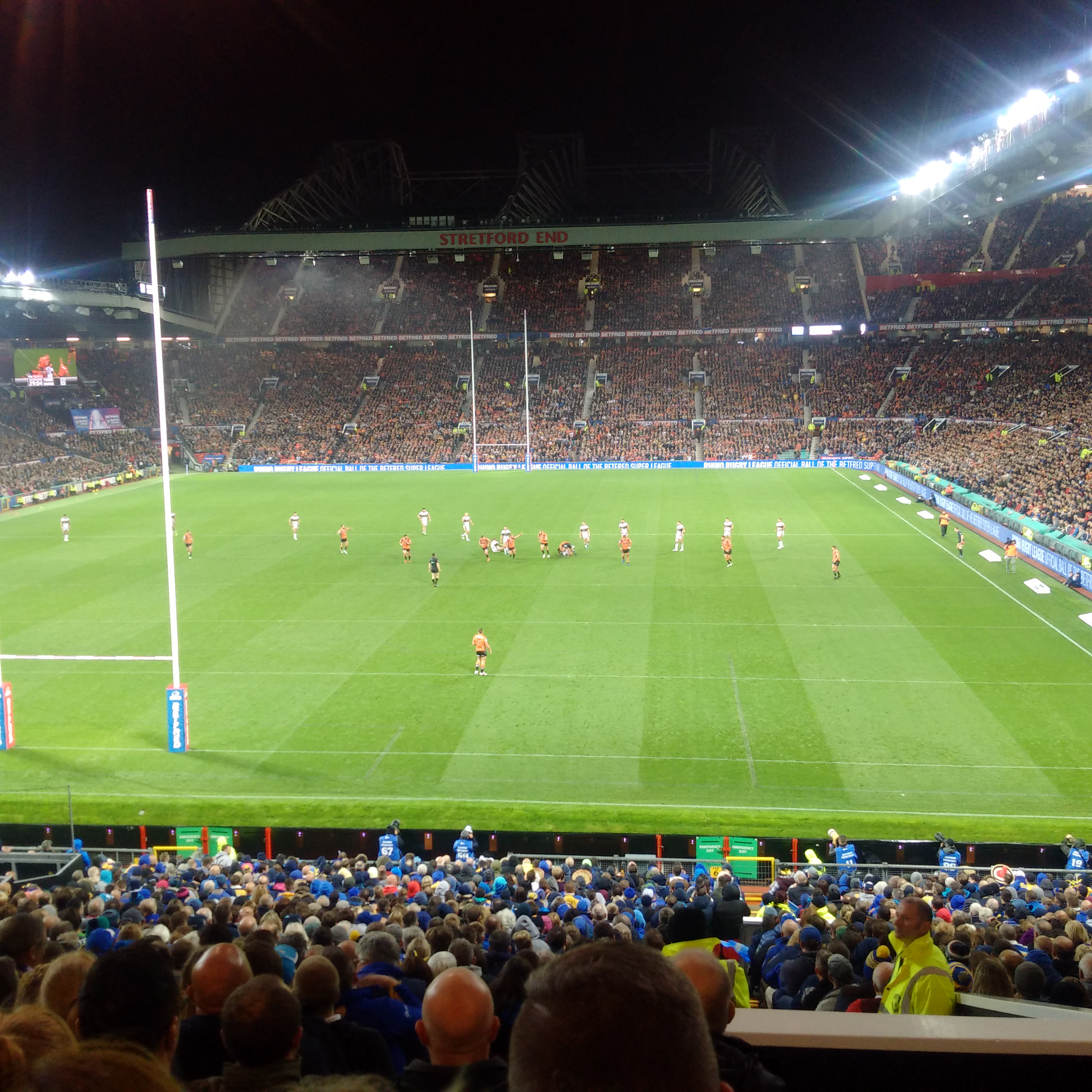
Views during the match

Prior the 2017 Super League Grand Final, Castleford and Leeds had met four previous times during the year with Castleford winning all four encounters including a 66-10 victory in round 3. Castleford went into the match as heavy favourites to win their first ever championship however in the grand final itself, Leeds would comfortably win 24-6 with Castleford's only points coming in the final minute of the match.

The attendance was officially a sell out with the Leeds Rhinos having 28,000 fans. Castleford Tigers also take 30 coaches and 15,000 Cas supporters.

The game was full of controversy in the build up when the Tigers main man Zak Hardaker was suspended for taking a few lines of a well known illegal Class A drug. Classy Cas was ridiculed by the Rhinos fans as Classless Cas

7 October 2017

Castleford Tigers	6–24	Leeds Rhinos
Tries: Foster; Goals: Gale		Tries: Briscoe (2) McGuire (2); Goals: Watkins (3); Drop Goals: McGuire (2)

Old Trafford, Manchester
Attendance: 72,827
Referee: James Child (Batley & Dewsbury)

Castleford Tigers		Position	Leeds Rhinos	
5	(England) Greg Eden	Fullback	31	(England) Jack Walker
2	(England) Greg Minikin	Winger	2	(England) Tom Briscoe
3	(Australia) Jake Webster	Centre	3	(England) Kallum Watkins
4	(England) Michael Shenton	Centre	14	(England) Liam Sutcliffe
25	(Australia) Jy Hitchcox	Winger	5	(England) Ryan Hall
16	(Australia) Ben Roberts	Stand Off	4	(Australia) Joel Moon
7	(England) Luke Gale	Scrum half	6	(England) Danny McGuire
14	(England) Nathan Massey	Prop	16	(Ireland) Brad Singleton
9	(England) Paul McShane	Hooker	9	(Australia) Matt Parcell
15	(New Zealand) Jesse Sene-Lefao	Prop	17	(Australia) Mitch Garbutt
11	(England) Oliver Holmes	2nd Row	11	(England) Jamie Jones Buchanan
12	(England) Mike McMeeken	2nd Row	13	(England) Stevie Ward
13	(England) Adam Milner	Loose forward	10	(Australia) Adam Cuthbertson
10	(England) Grant Millington	Interchange	7	(England) Rob Burrow
17	(New Zealand) Junior Moors	Interchange	12	(England) Carl Ablett
18	(England) Matt Cook	Interchange	19	(England) Brett Ferres
34	(England) Alex Foster	Interchange	20	(Ireland) Anthony Mullally
	(England) Darryl Powell	Coach		(England) Brian McDermott
