= Jamel Chisholm =

Jamaica international rugby league & union footballer

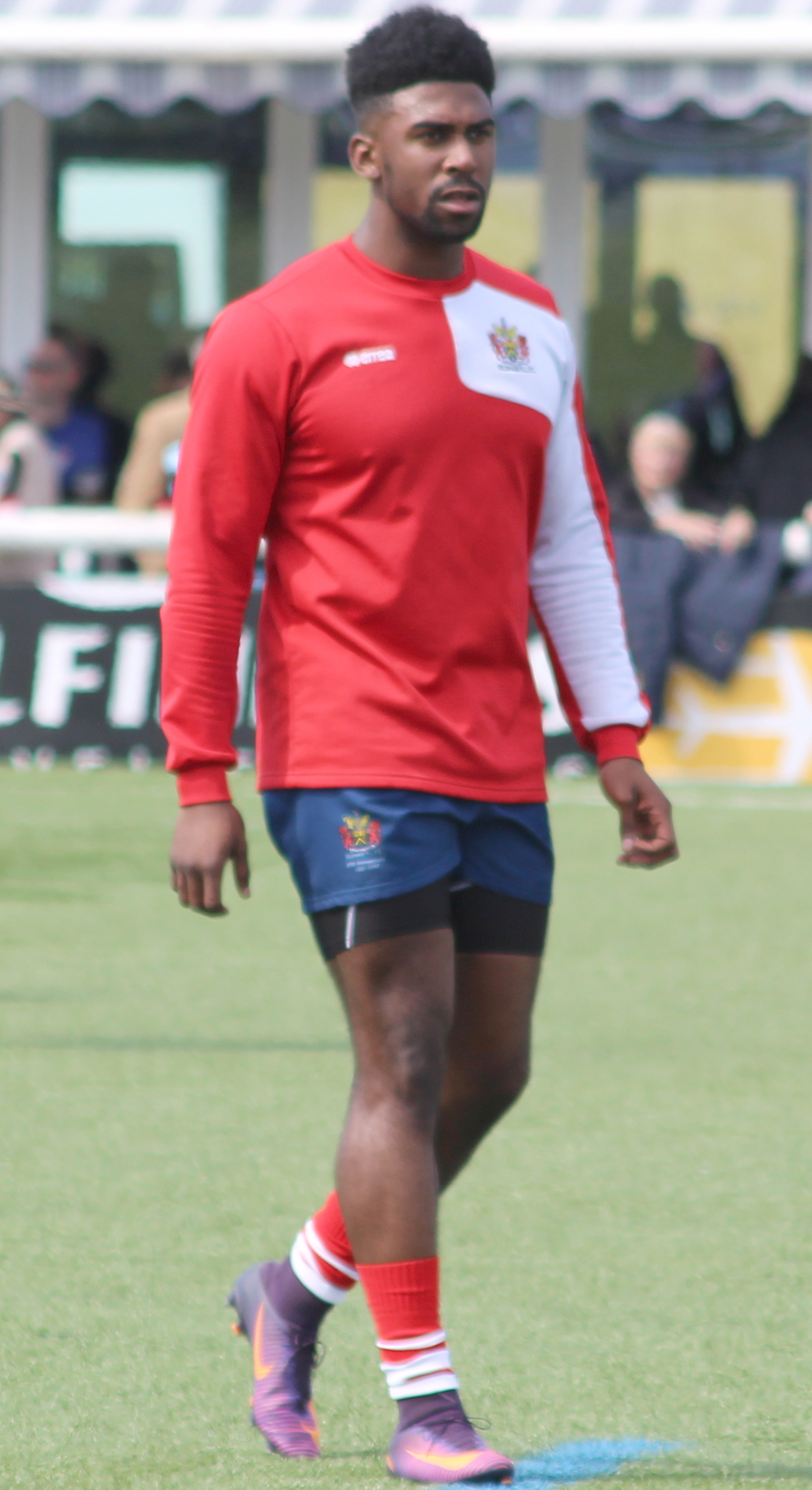
- Chisholm in 2017

Personal information
- Born: 7 November 1992 (age 33) Chapeltown, Leeds, England

Playing information
- Height: 6 ft 1 in (1.85 m)
- Weight: 15 st 1 lb (96 kg)

Rugby league
- Position: Wing
Club
| Years | Team | Pld | T | G | FG | P |
|---|---|---|---|---|---|---|
| | Leeds Rhinos |
| 2013(loan) | → Hunslet Hawks | 7 | 1 | 0 | 0 | 4 |
| 2014 | Featherstone Rovers | 1 | 1 | 0 | 0 | 4 |
| 2014 | Hemel Stags | 2 | 0 | 0 | 0 | 0 |
| 2015 | York City Knights |
| 2015(loan) | → London Skolars | 3 | 1 | 0 | 0 | 4 |
| 2016–17 | Oldham | 29 | 11 | 0 | 0 | 44 |
| | Total | 42 | 14 | 0 | 0 | 56 |

Rugby union
- Position: Wing
Club
| Years | Team | Pld | T | G | FG | P |
|---|---|---|---|---|---|---|
| 2012–13 | Leeds Carnegie | 10 | 4 | 0 | 0 | 20 |

Jamel Chisholm (born 11 August 1995) is a Jamaican former rugby league footballer, who played as a winger for Hunslet Hawks, Featherstone Rovers, Hemel Stags, York City Knights, London Skolars, and Oldham.

He is also a former rugby union player.

== Background ==
Chisholm was born in Chapeltown, Leeds, England.

== Career ==
Chisholm has previously played for the Hunslet Hawks on dual-registration from the Leeds Rhinos. He has also played for Featherstone Rovers, Hemel Stags, York City Knights and the London Skolars.

Chisholm was Super League's fastest man.

Chisholm has played rugby union for Leeds Carnegie.
