= Joe Vickery =

English rugby league footballer

Personal information
- Born: 29 August 1989 (age 36) Exeter, England
- Height: 191 cm (6 ft 3 in)
- Weight: 99 kg (15 st 8 lb)

Playing information
- Position: Wing, Centre
Club
Years	Team	Pld	T	G	FG	P
2013	Leeds Rhinos	10	1	0	0	4
- Source: As of 18 November 2013

Joe Vickery (born 29 August 1989) is an English professional rugby league footballer. His regular position is wing or centre.

He played as a junior for St. George Illawarra Dragons and was named in the team of the year for the 2009 NRL Under-20s season. He then spent two seasons at Gold Coast Titans without making his first team debut; during this time played for their feeder club, Tweed Heads Seagulls.

In November 2012, Vickery joined Leeds Rhinos on a three-month trial during which he scored 2 tries against Wakefield Trinity Wildcats in the traditional Boxing Day fixture in December 2012. He then signed a one-year contract with the club after which he made ten appearances and scored one try for the club. In August 2013 Vickery left Leeds Rhinos by mutual consent having been out with an ankle injury since May.
