= Jack Walker (rugby league) =

Scotland international rugby league footballer

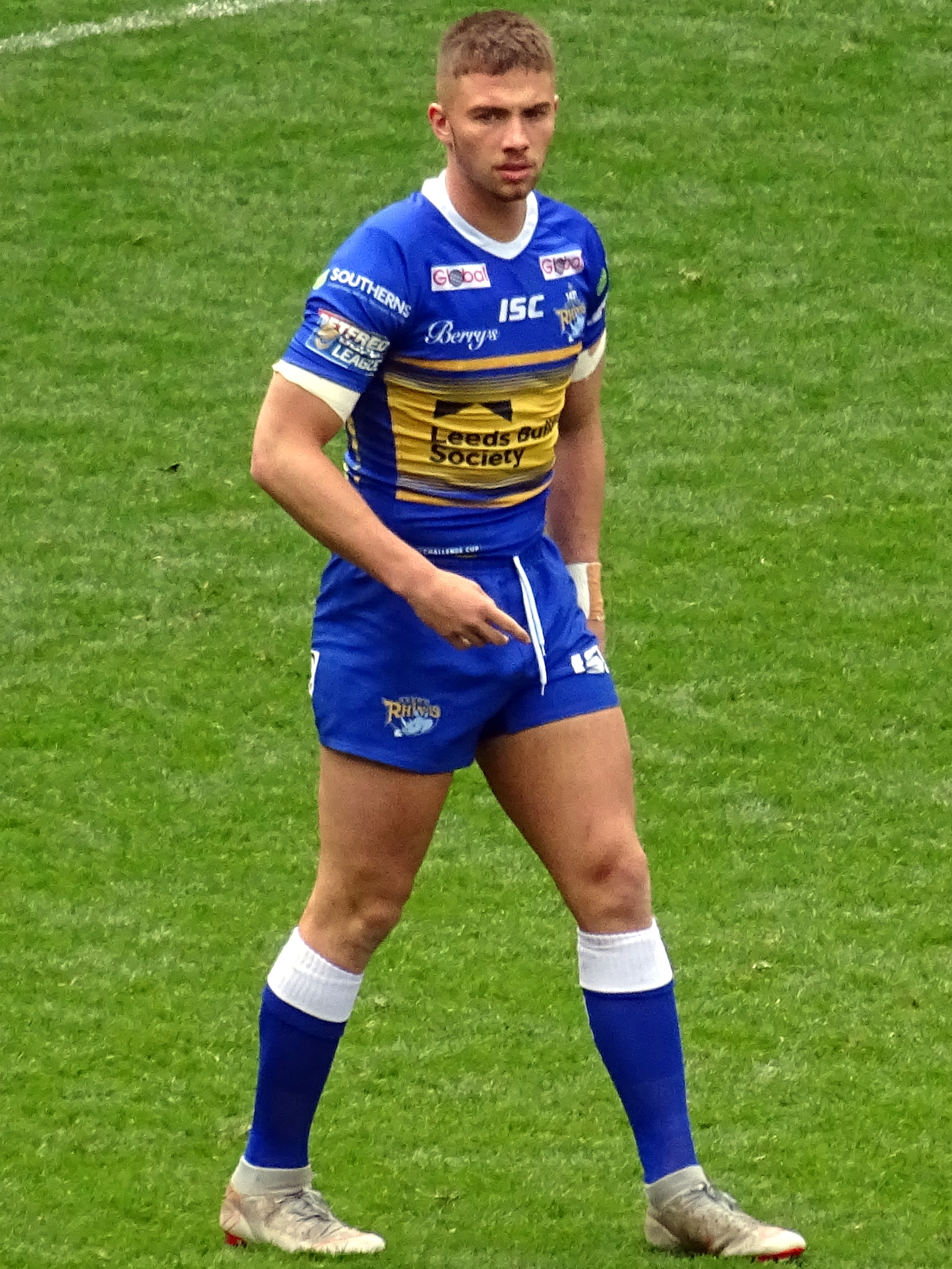

Personal information
- Full name: Jack Walker
- Born: 8 August 1999 (age 27) Leeds, West Yorkshire, England
- Height: 5 ft 8 in (1.73 m)
- Weight: 13 st 3 lb (84 kg)

Playing information
- Position: Fullback
Club
Years	Team	Pld	T	G	FG	P
2017–22	Leeds Rhinos	75	22	0	0	88
2022(loan)	→ Hull FC	6	2	0	0	8
2023	Bradford Bulls	7	3	0	0	12
2023	Hull Kingston Rovers	10	5	0	0	20
2024	Hull FC	14	5	0	0	20
2025	Sheffield Eagles	18	3	0	0	12
2025	Salford Red Devils	4	1	0	0	4
2026	Oldham	23	15	0	0	60
	Total	157	56	0	0	224
Representative
Years	Team	Pld	T	G	FG	P
2018	England Knights	1	1	0	0	4
2026	Scotland	1	0	0	0	0
- Source: As of 6 November 2026

Jack William Walker (born 8 August 1999) is an English professional rugby league footballer who last played as a fullback for Oldham RLFC in the RFL Championship and Scotland at international level.

== Background ==
Walker was born in Leeds, West Yorkshire, England.

== Club career ==
Walker made his début for Leeds in the Challenge Cup against Doncaster where he scored a hat trick. He made his first Super League début against Huddersfield. He then went on to become Leeds' first choice fullback and played in the Rhinos' 2017 Super League Grand Final victory over the Castleford Tigers 24-6 at Old Trafford.

=== Hull FC ===
On 21 September 2023 it was announced that he had signed for Hull F.C. ahead of the 2024 season.

=== Sheffield Eagles ===
On 17 Jan 2025 it was reported that he had signed for Sheffield Eagles in the RFL Championship

=== Salford Red Devils ===
On 28 August 2025 it was reported that he had signed for Salford Red Devils in the Super League

=== Oldham RLFC ===
On 7 January 2026 it was reported that he had signed for Oldham RLFC in the RFL Championship on a 1-year deal.

=== Huddersfield Giants (Reserves) - loan ===
On 14 March 2026 he made a surprise appearance for Huddersfield Giants Reserves in their match against Warrington Wolves Reserves

== International career ==
In 2018, Walker was selected to play for England Knights on their tour of Papua New Guinea. He played against Papua New Guinea at the Oil Search National Football Stadium.

He made his Scotland début in the 12-46 Celtic Cup defeat to Ireland on 17 October 2026

== Honours ==
=== Club ===
- Super League:

- Winner: 2017

- World Club Challenge:

- Runner up: 2018
