= James Duckworth (rugby league) =

English rugby league footballer

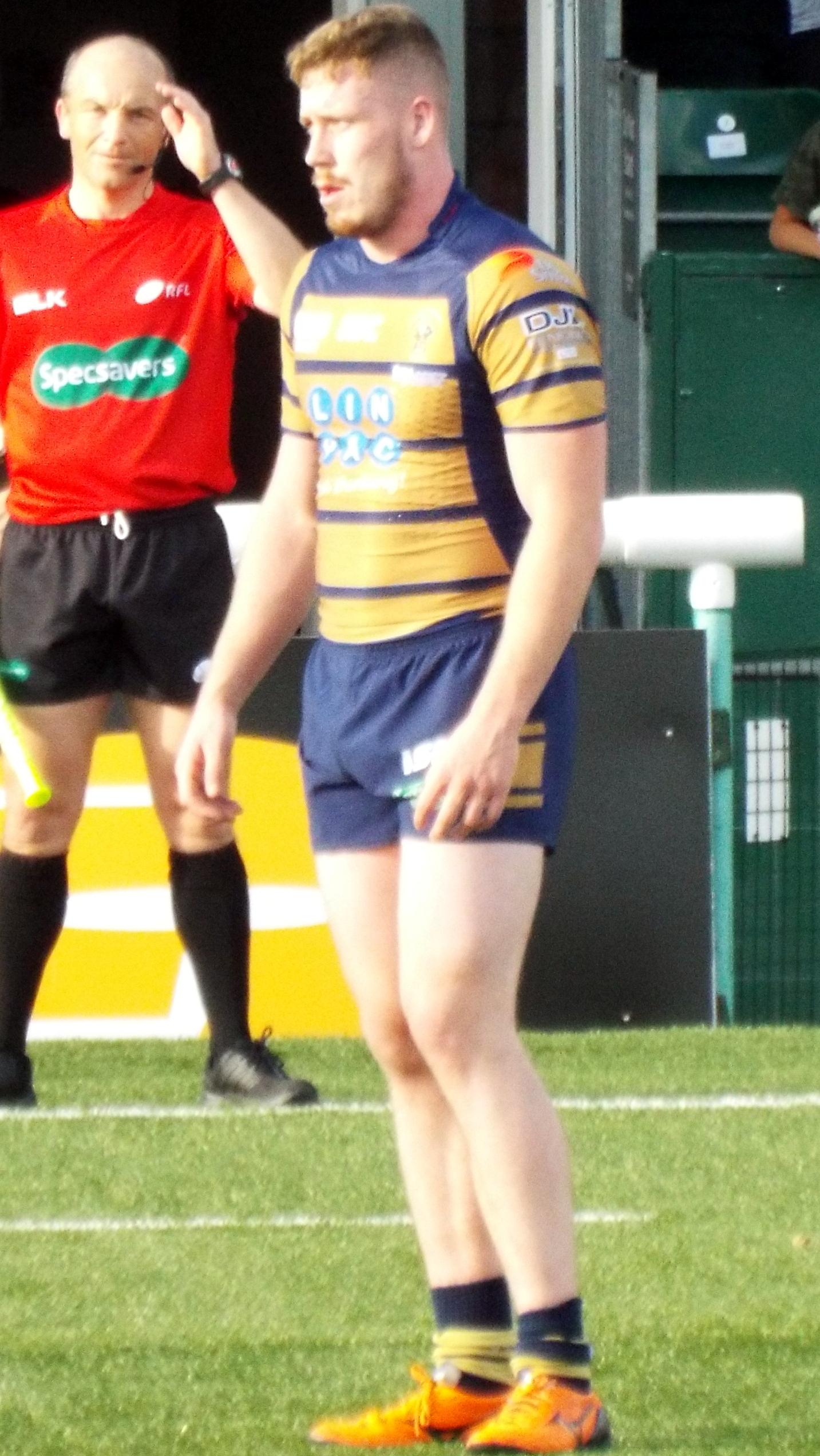

Personal information
- Full name: James Duckworth
- Born: 9 April 1994 (age 31); Leeds, West Yorkshire, England
- Height: 6 ft 1 in (1.85 m)
- Weight: 14 st 11 lb (94 kg)

Playing information
- Position: Wing
Club
Years	Team	Pld	T	G	FG	P
2013	Leeds Rhinos	2	1	0	0	4
2014(loan)	→ London Broncos	3	0	0	0	0
2014(loan)	→ Hunslet Hawks	6	3	0	0	12
2015(loan)	→ Hunslet Hawks	25	3	0	0	12
2016	Hunslet Hawks	14	6	0	0	24
2016(loan)	→ Featherstone Rovers	9	3	0	0	12
2017	Featherstone Rovers	5	2	0	0	8
2017(loan)	→ Hunslet	7	4	0	0	16
	Total	71	22	0	0	88
- Source: As of 13 January 2018

James Duckworth (born 9 April 1994) is an English professional rugby league footballer who played on the wing for the Hunslet Hawks in Kingstone Press League 1.

Duckworth came through the Leeds Rhinos Academy. He played for the Leeds Rhinos, and the London Broncos in the Super League.

He has spent time on loan at Hunslet and Featherstone Rovers.
