= Callum McLelland =

Scotland international rugby league footballer

Cal McLelland
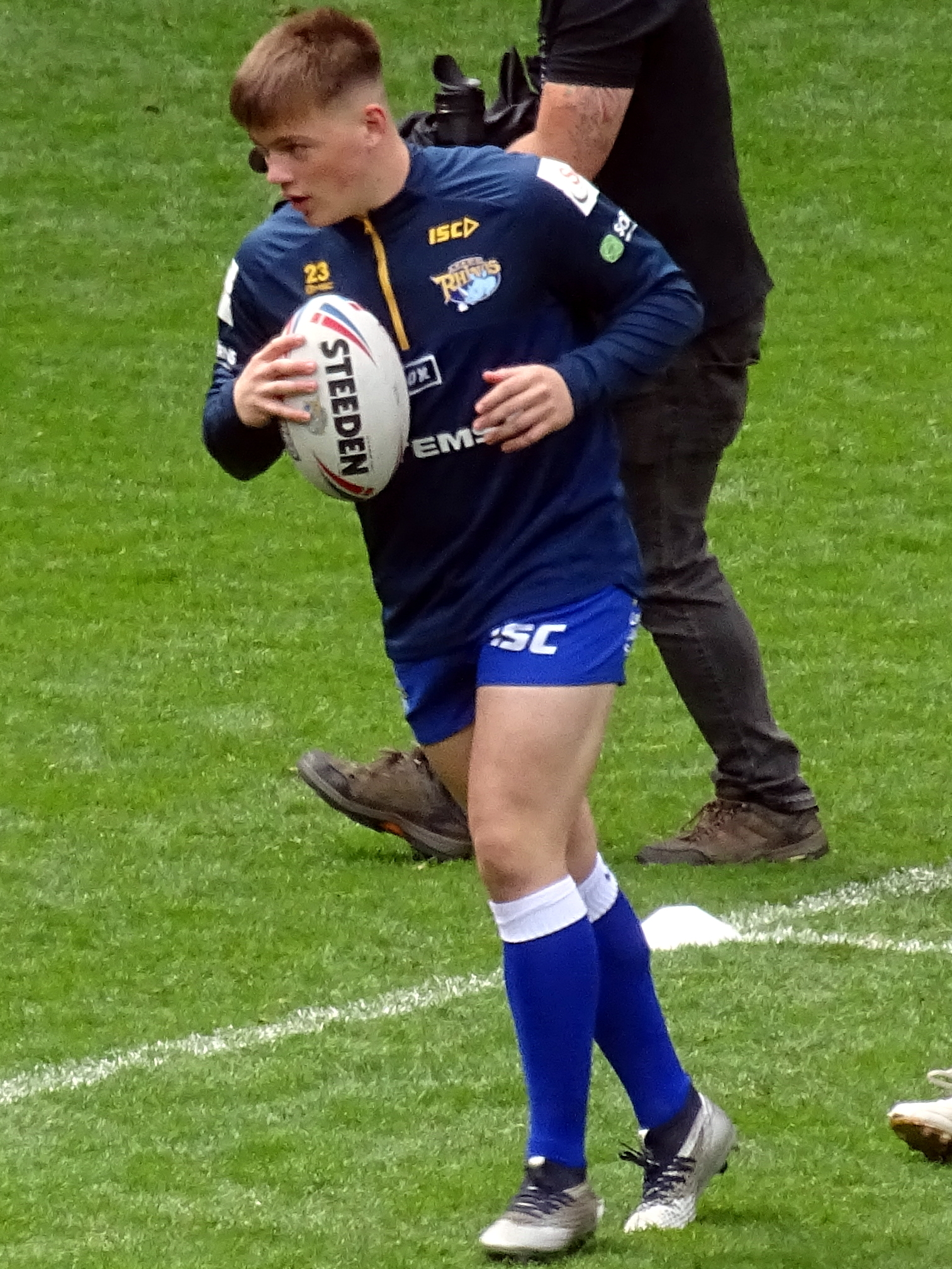

Personal information
- Full name: Callum McLelland
- Born: 16 September 1999 (age 26) Pontefract, West Yorkshire, England

Playing information
- Height: 5 ft 10 in (1.77 m)
- Weight: 15 st 10 lb (100 kg)

Rugby union
Club
Years	Team	Pld	T	G	FG	P
2017–18	Edinburgh Rugby	8	1	2	0	9

Rugby league
- Position: Scrum-half, Stand-off
Club
Years	Team	Pld	T	G	FG	P
2019–21	Leeds Rhinos	16	2	0	0	8
2019(loan)	→ Featherstone Rovers	12	4	0	0	16
2020(loan)	→ Featherstone Rovers	3	1	0	0	4
2022–23	Castleford Tigers	0	0	0	0	0
2024–	Midlands Hurricanes	20	5	0	0	20
	Total	51	12	0	0	48
Representative
Years	Team	Pld	T	G	FG	P
2019–	Scotland	2	3	0	0	12

Callum McLelland (born 16 September 1999) is a Scotland international rugby league footballer who plays as a scrum-half or stand-off for the Midlands Hurricanes in the RFL League 1.

He has previously played for the Leeds Rhinos in the Super League, and has spent time on loan from Leeds at Featherstone Rovers in the RFL Championship.

== Background ==
McLelland was born in Pontefract, West Yorkshire, England. He qualified to represent Scotland through his grandfather, born in East Ayrshire.

McLelland attended Castleford Academy. He played his junior rugby league for his local team Castleford Lock Lane before being picked up by the Castleford Tigers academy.

After progressing through the Tigers academy system, in November 2017 McLelland left the club to cross codes and join Edinburgh Rugby Union. This was through the Scottish Rugby Union's 'Scottish Qualified' scheme. McLelland said, "Lads in rugby league don’t get opportunities like this, to travel the world and represent your country constantly through the year. It’s a life-changer for my family to be able to live up in Edinburgh and I can really start to make a name for myself."

== Club career ==
=== Leeds Rhinos ===
In August 2018, after less than a year with Edinburgh Rugby Union, McLelland switched codes again and signed for the Leeds Rhinos on a three-and-a-half-year contract for an undisclosed fee.

On 12 April 2019, McLelland made his professional debut for Leeds against Workington Town in the Challenge Cup. On 11 May, he scored his first try for Leeds against the Bradford Bulls in the following round of the cup. He made his Super League debut on 16 May against the Castleford Tigers.

McLelland made a further 13 appearances for Leeds, scoring 1 try, with his playtime severely restricted by injury.

==== Featherstone Rovers (dual registration) ====
In June 2019, McLelland joined Championship side Featherstone Rovers through their dual registration arrangement with Leeds. He made 12 appearances and scored 4 tries, appearing in every play-off game as Rovers eventually finished runners up in the Million Pound Game.

McLelland continued to play for Featherstone at the beginning of the 2020 season, making a further 3 appearances and scoring 1 try.

=== Castleford Tigers ===
On 11 October 2021, the Castleford Tigers announced that McLelland would re-join his hometown club on a two-year contract, with an option of a further two years. McLelland was assigned the squad number 16 for the 2022 season, although a patella tendon injury sustained while at Leeds persisted and prevented him from making an appearance.

In March 2023, McLelland spoke of his desire to repay the club for their support during his injury rehabilitation. However, in June, head physiotherapist Matt Crowther revealed that McLelland had unfortunately "suffered a further setback in his recovery". On 21 June, Castleford confirmed that the two parties had come to an agreement on the early termination of his contract. McLelland would depart the club with immediate effect, having not made a senior appearance, to pursue a new venture outside of the sport.

=== Midlands Hurricanes ===
On 8 December 2023, it was announced that McLelland had signed for Midlands Hurricanes in League 1.

== Representative career ==
=== England rugby league ===
McLelland was named in England's elite under-15s squad in August 2015, captaining and scoring in the 52-12 victory against Wales under-16s at Taffs Well.

McLelland captained the England Academy side in 2017. He started at stand-off against France under-18s at Stade de la Méditerranée on 9 October, where he kicked the late winning drop goal, and at Stade Gilbert Brutus on 13 October, in a 1-1 series draw.

=== Scotland rugby union ===
McLelland's move to Edinburgh Rugby Union through the 'Scottish Qualified' programme saw him play for the Scotland national under-20 rugby union team. He made his debut in the Under-20s Six Nations and also went on to play in the World Rugby Under-20s Championship, making a total of 8 appearances.

=== Return to England rugby league ===
In December 2018, following his return to rugby league, McLelland re-established his place in the England Academy side. He started at stand-off against the Australian Schoolboys at Leigh Sports Village on 8 December and at Headingley Stadium on 14 December, helping to secure a 2-0 series win for England Academy.

=== Scotland rugby league ===
In October 2019, McLelland was named in Scotland's 22-man squad for the European qualifiers of the 2021 Rugby League World Cup. On 26 October, he made his senior international debut and scored a try in Scotland's 86-0 victory over Serbia. On 1 November, he scored 2 tries in Scotland's 42-24 victory over Greece, securing qualification for the 2021 World Cup.
