= Stevie Ward =

English RL administrator and former professional rugby league footballer

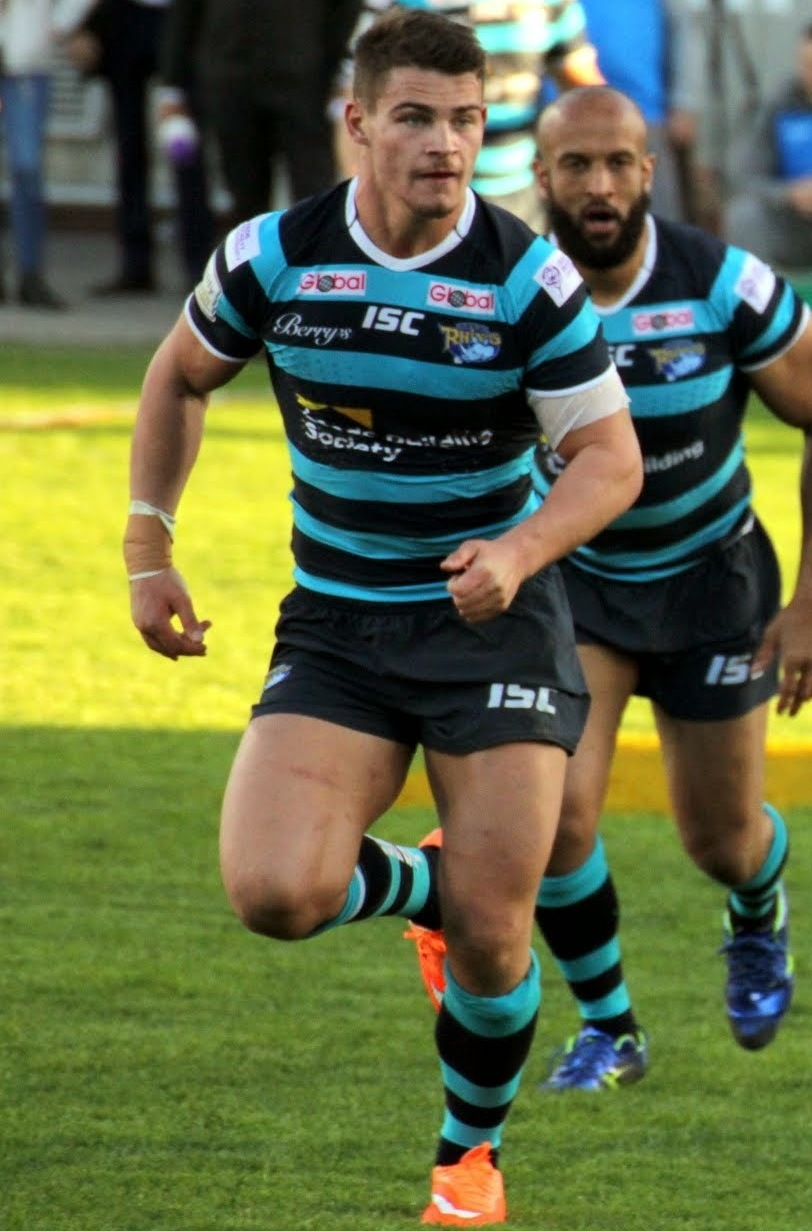

Personal information
- Full name: Stevie Ray Ward
- Born: 17 November 1993 (age 31) Leeds, West Yorkshire, England

Playing information
- Height: 6 ft 1 in (1.86 m)
- Weight: 15 st 10 lb (100 kg)
- Position: Second-row, Loose forward
Club
Years	Team	Pld	T	G	FG	P
2012–21	Leeds Rhinos	136	23	0	0	92

Stevie Ray Ward (born 17 November 1993) is an English former professional rugby league footballer who played as a second-row or loose forward for the Leeds Rhinos in the Super League.

== Background ==
Ward was born in Morley, Leeds, West Yorkshire, England, to an Irish father and Welsh Mother.

== Playing career ==
Ward played his junior rugby at local amateur teams Morley Rugby Club, Churwell and Hunslet Warriors, when playing for these clubs people compared him to Leeds captain Kevin Sinfield. In 2010 he had an impressive season with the Leeds U18's team delivering some great performances, he made the step up into the U20's the following season whilst also having the opportunity to train with the first team. He played in the friendly against Featherstone Rovers in 2011 and his performances for the U20's earned him a place in the Leeds first team squad in 2012.

Ward made his first team début in Round 8 in the 6–46 defeat by St. Helens. He featured in the next two rounds before being demoted back to the U20's. These three games did Stevie some good as coach Brian McDermott then selected Ward for the Round 17 clash against Warrington Wolves, Ward then featured in every game up to Round 27 against Huddersfield Giants. Ward's only try in the regular season came in Round 24 against Widnes. He signed a five-year deal with the Leeds club midway through the year.

Ward was also selected to play in the Challenge Cup semi-final against holders Wigan, Leeds won the game 39-28 which put them through to the final. He played in the 2012 Challenge Cup Final 35–18 defeat by Warrington at Wembley Stadium.

Ward played in all four games of the playoff series after a 5th-placed finish in the regular rounds. He started on the bench against Wakefield Trinity Wildcats in the 42–20 win. Ward featured in the 27–20 win at Catalans Dragons, and scored his second try for the Leeds club to guide them to a semi-final place. He played in the 13–12 victory over the Wigan club which meant Leeds would once again be involved in the Super League Grand Final. Ward did feature off the bench in the 2012 Super League Grand Final, and contributed to his sides 26–18 win at Old Trafford with a good defensive performance.

Ward was injured for pre-season in 2013 and missed the first two friendlies however he made an appearance against Hunslet Hawks. Ward featured against Salford in Round 3 and scored the first try of the game. He then started in the second row in the 2013 World Club Challenge in the 18–14 defeat by National Rugby League (NRL) champions Melbourne. Ward then featured in Round 5 (St. Helens) to Round 13 (Hull Kingston Rovers). He also featured in the Challenge Cup against Castleford Tigers. Ward was injured for Round 14–27. Ward featured heavily again in 2014 being part of the squad that won the Challenge Cup for the first time since 1999 beating Castleford. Ward again featured in the team that won the Challenge Cup for the second consecutive year beating Hull Kingston Rovers by a record 50–0 at Wembley Stadium.

Ward also played in the last game of the regular season against Huddersfield where the Leeds side won in stoppage time to seal the League Leaders' Shield however Ward was injured in this match and missed the Grand Final. In the 2017 Super 8's playoff semi-final, Ward dislocated his shoulder in the win over Hull F.C. and many feared he would miss the Grand Final the following week. He was duly named in the squad for the Final and went on to play the full 80 mins just a week after his injury and collect a Winners Medal as the Rhinos beat Castleford 24–6 in a dominant display of rugby. He played in the 2017 Super League Grand Final victory over the Castleford Tigers at Old Trafford. In January 2021 he announced his retirement due to long-standing consequences of a concussion injury he sustained in the first game of the 2020 season.

Season	Appearances	Tries	Goals	F/G	Points
2012 Leeds Rhinos	21	2	0	0	8
2013 Leeds Rhinos	11	1	0	0	4
2014 Leeds Rhinos	22	3	0	0	12
2015 Leeds Rhinos	28	5	0	0	20
Total	82	11	0	0	44

== International career ==
=== England ===
In 2009, Ward was part of the England youth squad who took part in the European Nations Cup in Serbia alongside France, Wales, Serbia, Scotland, Russia and a European Celts side.

He also represented England Academy in 2010 and was a try scorer in their narrow defeat by France. Ward was named in the England Academy side at the end of the 2011, representing them in their game against the Australian Institute of Sport alongside fellow Rhinos James Duckworth and Jordan Baldwinson, but the youngsters just lost out to their Australian counterparts, losing 22–20.

In October 2016, Ward was called up to the senior team for the first team courtesy of an injury replacement for club teammate Brett Ferres. Ward was called up into the final 24-man England team for the 2016 Four Nations but didn't play.

Ward was named in England 2017 World Cup squad but had to pull out due to having surgery on his shoulder in the off season.

== Honours ==
- Super League (3): 2012, 2015, 2017
- Challenge Cup: (2) 2014, 2015
- League Leaders' Shield: 2015
