= Liam Sutcliffe =

England international rugby league footballer (born 1994)

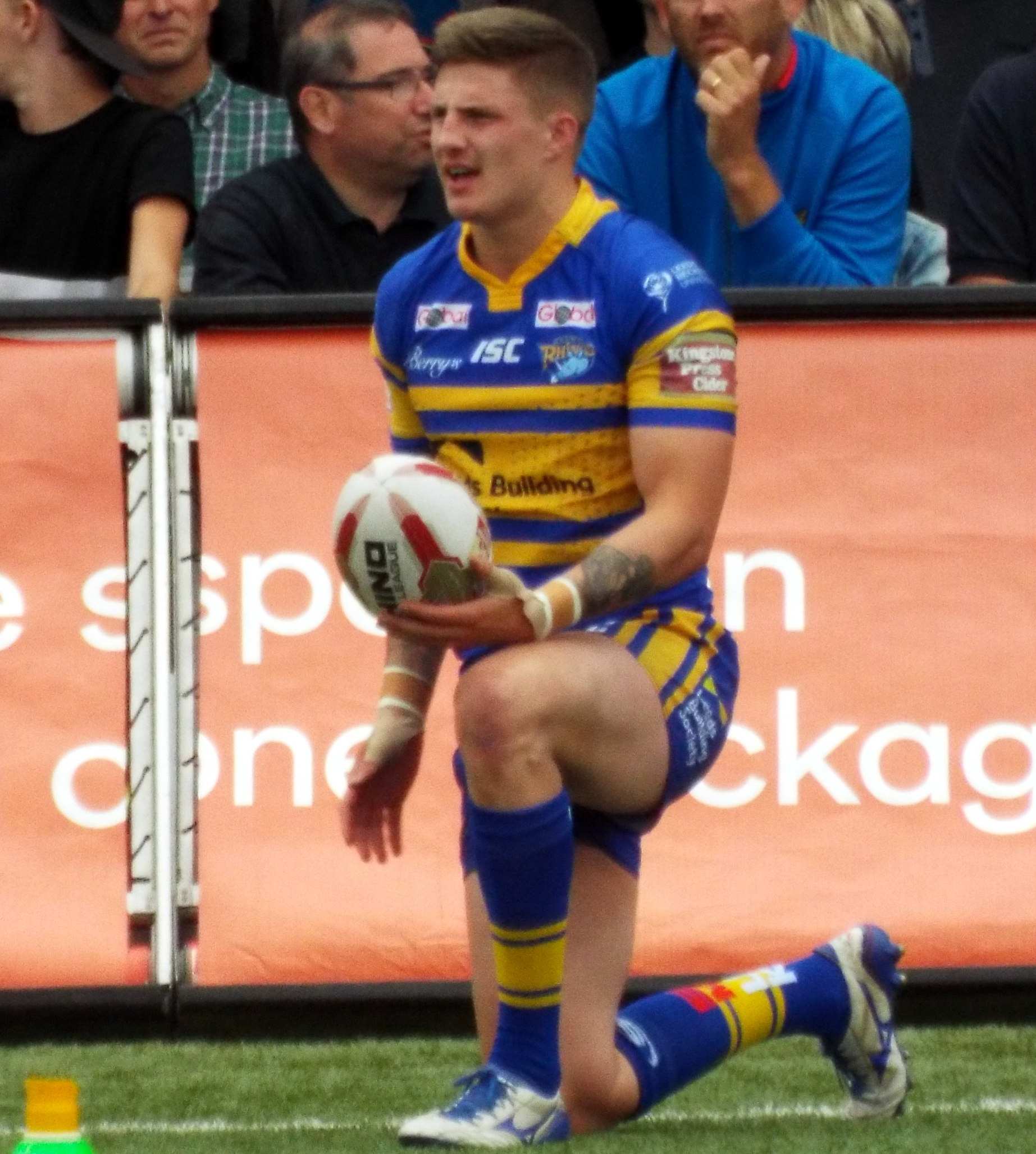

Personal information
- Full name: Liam Sutcliffe
- Born: 25 November 1994 (age 31) Wakefield, West Yorkshire, England
- Height: 6 ft 2 in (1.89 m)
- Weight: 14 st 11 lb (94 kg)

Playing information
- Position: Stand-off, Centre
Club
Years	Team	Pld	T	G	FG	P
2012–22	Leeds Rhinos	223	72	258	3	807
2014(loan)	→ Bradford Bulls	4	1	0	0	4
2020(DR)	→ Featherstone Rovers	1	0	0	0	0
2023–24	Hull FC	38	11	14	0	72
2025–26	Huddersfield Giants	5	0	9	0	18
2026(loan)	→ Halifax Panthers	1	0	0	0	0
2026	Midlands Hurricanes	6	2	0	0	8
2027–	Doncaster RLFC	0	0	0	0	0
	Total	278	86	281	3	909
Representative
Years	Team	Pld	T	G	FG	P
2018	England	1	0	0	0	0
2018	England Knights	1	1	0	0	4
- Source: As of 10 November 2026

Liam Sutcliffe (born 25 November 1994) is an English professional rugby league footballer who plays in a variety of positions for the Doncaster RLFC in the RFL Championship.

He has previously played for Leeds Rhinos, Hull FC and Huddersfield Giants in the Super League and England and the England Knights at international level.

Sutcliffe has spent time on loan from Leeds at the Bradford Bulls in the Super League, and Featherstone Rovers in the Championship.

== Background ==
Sutcliffe was born in Wakefield, West Yorkshire, England.

== Career ==
=== Leeds Rhinos ===
Sutcliffe featured in the pre-season friendly against Wakefield Trinity in the annual Boxing Day Festive Challenge. Liam broke into the 1st team due to a long-term injury to stand-off; Danny McGuire. He made his début against St. Helens, and went on to play in the playoffs due to more injuries towards the end of the season. In his début season he went on to make 18 appearances and scored seven tries.

In 2014 Sutcliffe featured in Round 1 and played in the 2014 Challenge Cup Final victory over the Castleford Tigers at Wembley Stadium. In his second season, he played 25 games and scored 10 tries and he also kicked 8 goals.

Sutcliffe featured in more games in 2015. He started games after captain Kevin Sinfield was injured and proved he could score and kick goals which kept Sinfield out of the starting 13. Unfortunate Sutcliffe had an anterior cruciate ligament (ACL) knee injury which ruled him out for the remainder of the season which meant he missed the Challenge Cup Final and Grand Final. He played 15 games scoring 6 times and kicking 25 goals. After Sinfield retired at the end of 2015 Sutcliffe was promoted to the starting 13 and was given the number 14 shirt. He also played in the World Club Series against North Queensland Cowboys.

He played in the 2017 Super League Grand Final victory over the Castleford Tigers at Old Trafford.

On 17 October 2020, he played in the 2020 Challenge Cup Final victory for Leeds over Salford at Wembley Stadium. In the 2022 elimination playoff, Sutcliffe scored a hat-trick in Leeds shock 20-10 victory over Catalans Dragons. On 24 September 2022, Sutcliffe played for Leeds in their 24-12 loss to St Helens RFC in the 2022 Super League Grand Final.

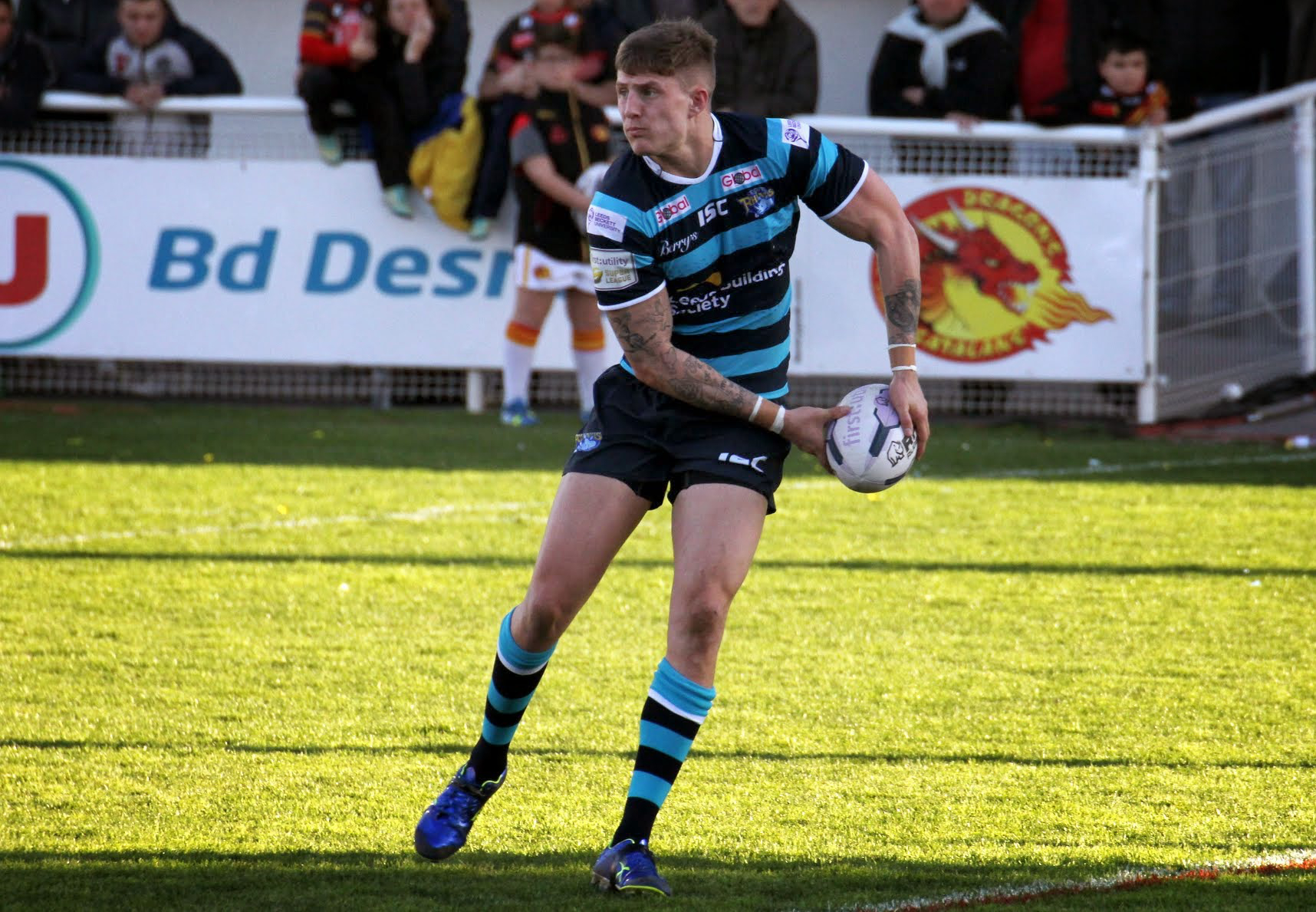
Sutcliffe playing for the Leeds Rhinos

=== Bradford Bulls ===
In 2014, Sutcliffe was sent out on loan to the struggling Bradford Bulls on a one-month loan playing four games and scoring once before they were relegated.

=== Hull F.C. ===
In round 10 of the 2023 Super League season, Sutcliffe scored two tries in Hull FC's 20-14 win over Huddersfield which ended a seven-game losing streak. Sutcliffe played a total of 19 games for Hull F.C. for in the Super League XXVIII season as the club finished 10th on the table.

=== Huddersfield Giants ===
On 27 September 2024, it was reported that he had signed for Huddersfield in the Super League on a three-year deal.

On 23 July 2026, the club announced that he had left with immediate effect There was no indication yet as to how this could affect his current recent loan agreement at Halifax Panthers.

=== Halifax Panthers (loan) ===
On 17 July 2026 it was reported that he had signed for Halifax Panthers in the RFL Championship on a rolling weekly loan

=== Doncaster RLFC ===
On 10 November 2026 it was reported that he had signed for Doncaster RLFC in the RFL Championship on a 2-year deal.

== International career ==
In 2018 he was selected for England against France at the Leigh Sports Village.

In 2018 he was selected for the England Knights on their tour of Papua New Guinea. He played against Papua New Guinea at the Lae Football Stadium.

== Statistics ==
Season	Appearances	Tries	Goals	F/G	Points
2013 Leeds	18	7	0	0	28
2014 Leeds	25	10	8	0	56
2014 Bradford	4	1	0	0	4
2015 Leeds	15	6	25	0	74
2016 Leeds	9	3	8	0	28
Total	71	27	41	0	190

== Honours ==
- Super League: 2017
- Challenge Cup: 2014 2020
