= Joel Moon =

Australian rugby league footballer

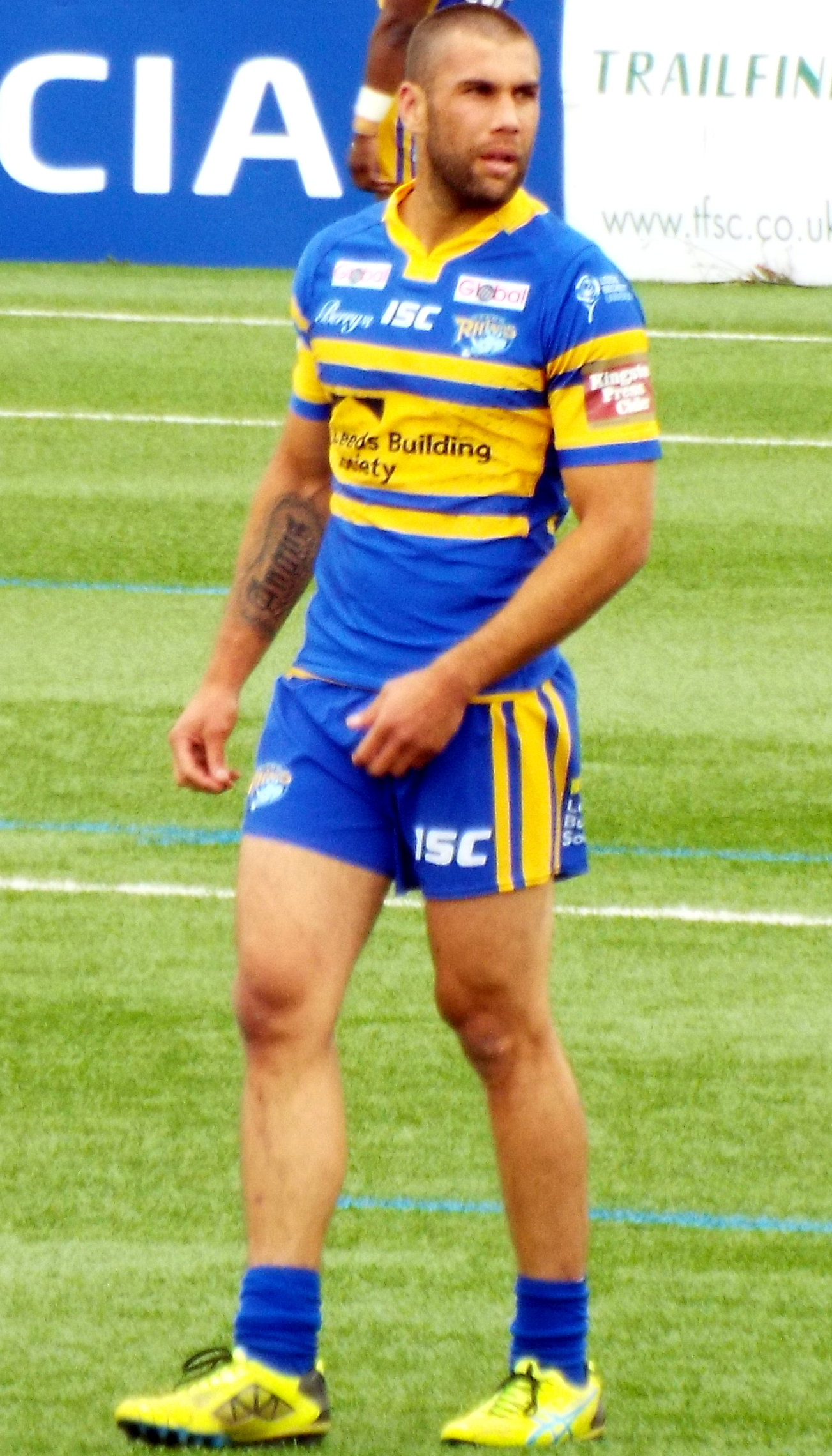

Personal information
- Full name: Joel Thomas Moon
- Born: 20 May 1988 (age 38) Caloundra, Queensland, Australia

Playing information
- Height: 185 cm (6 ft 1 in)
- Weight: 96 kg (15 st 2 lb)
- Position: Centre, Five-eighth
Club
Years	Team	Pld	T	G	FG	P
2006–08	Brisbane Broncos	31	10	1	0	42
2009–11	New Zealand Warriors	51	15	2	0	64
2012	Salford City Reds	19	11	0	0	44
2013–18	Leeds Rhinos	170	81	0	1	325
	Total	271	117	3	1	475
Representative
Years	Team	Pld	T	G	FG	P
2011	Indigenous All Stars	1	0	0	0	0
2012–13	Exiles	2	0	0	0	0

Joel Moon (born 20 May 1988) is an Australian former professional rugby league footballer who played as a centre and five-eighth in the 2000s and 2010s. He last played for the Leeds Rhinos in the Super League.

An Indigenous All-Stars and Exiles international representative, he previously played in the National Rugby League (NRL) for the Brisbane Broncos and the New Zealand Warriors. He commenced his Super League career with the Salford City Reds before switching to the Leeds Rhinos, with whom he won the 2015 Super League Championship.

== Background ==
Moon was born in Caloundra, Queensland, Australia, and attended Morayfield State High School, and played in the same team as future NRL players Matt Gillett, Jack Reed and Dane Hogan.

He started his rugby league career at Caloundra. He later was spotted by the Brisbane Broncos and moved to their feeder club in the Queensland Cup, the Toowoomba Clydesdales.

In 2005 Moon played for the Australian Schoolboys team, and also toured Britain with the Australian Institute of Sport. In 2007 he starred for Queensland under 19s against New South Wales in the curtain-raiser to the State of Origin series opener in May.

== Professional playing career ==
=== Broncos ===
Moon made his first grade début for the Brisbane Broncos in round 14 2006 as part of the 'Baby Broncos' side that played during the State of Origin series. He joined fellow teenager David Taylor as the first Broncos that were not yet born when the club burst onto the scene in 1988.

After three games for the club, Moon then played the rest of the 2006 season with feeder team Toowoomba Clydesdales, whom he helped reach the Queensland Cup Grand Final after scoring nine tries. He attracted interest from Melbourne Storm for the 2007 season but decided to stay with the Broncos.

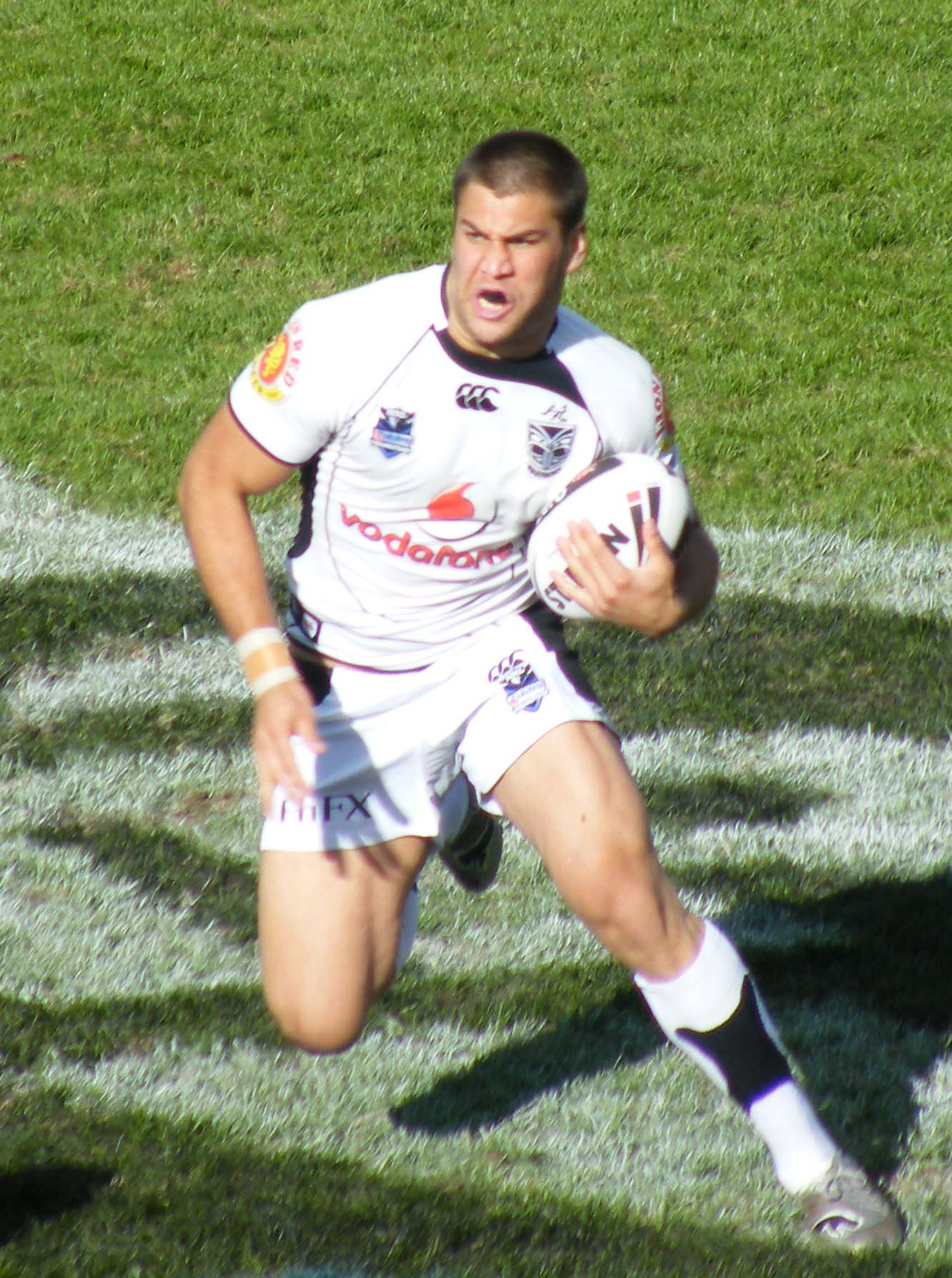
Moon playing for the Warriors in 2009

In NRL season 2007 Moon was selected in the centres for the opening game of the season against the North Queensland Cowboys. Moon played eleven games for the club and scored three tries. Moon was trialled as the fifth player to play at halfback for the club in 2007, before Bennett selected Michael Ennis as the long term option.

In 2008 Moon played seventeen games for the Broncos team and was good enough to attract interest from other National Rugby League sides such as the Canberra Raiders. However he signed with the New Zealand Warriors for 2009. When not selected for the first grade side, Moon turned out for the Norths Devils in the Queensland Cup.

=== Warriors ===
Moon joined fellow former Broncos Denan Kemp and Brent Tate at the New Zealand Warriors for 2009, deciding to move due to the Warriors offer to give him the chance to play at his preferred position of five eighth.

However, he did not perform up to the hype, and was shifted to centre, where he impressed, and managed to score 4 tries in the 32 all draw with the Penrith Panthers at CUA Stadium. He was re-signed for the 2011 season.

Moon was named in the Indigenous All Stars team in 2011 as a replacement for Sam Thaiday.

=== Salford ===
Moon signed with Salford for the 2012 and 2013 seasons. In 2012 Moon was selected to be in the Exiles squad by head coach Daniel Anderson, he narrowly missed out on selection for game 1 however he featured at centre for game 2 and help the Exiles retain the International Origin trophy with a 32–20 win.

=== Leeds ===
Moon's signing, for an undisclosed fee, was announced on 21 November 2012. He was expected to fill the void left by former Leeds centre Keith Senior, who retired through injury. Moon made his début for Leeds on 1 February 2013, he scored in the 2nd half and was awarded with the man of the match. Having made an excellent start to his Leeds career, forming an excellent partnership with winger Ryan Hall, which led him to sign a new contract with the club in May 2014, keeping him at Headingley until 2018.

He played in the 2014 Challenge Cup Final victory over the Castleford Tigers at Wembley Stadium,

He played in the 2015 Challenge Cup Final victory over Hull Kingston Rovers at Wembley Stadium.

He played in the 2015 Super League Grand Final victory over the Wigan Warriors at Old Trafford.

He played in the 2017 Super League Grand Final victory over the Castleford Tigers at Old Trafford.

=== Return to Australia and Retirement ===
On 17 October 2019, it was announced that Moon had returned to Australia, signing with Queensland Cup side Sunshine Coast Falcons for the 2020 season.

On 12 February 2020, it was announced that Moon had retired due to a chronic knee injury. He did not play a game for the Falcons.

== Honours ==
=== Club ===
- Super League (2): 2015, 2017
- League Leader's Shield (1): 2015
- Challenge Cup (2): 2014, 2015
