= 2013 Hull FC season =

- Super League XVIII Rank: 6th
- Play-off result: Preliminary Semi-Final
- Challenge Cup: Runners Up
- 2013 record: Wins: 18; draws: 2; losses: 14
- Points scored: For: 810; against: 696

Team information
- Chairman: Adam Pearson
- Head Coach: Peter Gentle
- Captain: Gareth Ellis
- Stadium: KC Stadium
- Avg. attendance: 11,640
- High attendance: 19,064

Top scorers
- Tries: Ben Crooks - 20
- Goals: Danny Tickle - 54
- Points: Danny Tickle - 120
← 2012	List of seasons	2014 →

This article details the Hull F.C. rugby league football club's 2013 season. This was the 18th season of the Super League era.

== Pre season friendlies ==
LEGEND
Win
Draw
Loss

Hull FC score is first.

Date	Competition	Vrs	H/A	Venue	Result	Score	Tries	Goals	Att	Report
13/1/2013	Pre Season	Tigers	H	KC Stadium	W	26-6	Crooks, Bowden, Heremaia, Westerman, McDonnell	Crooks 1/2, Holdsworth 2/3	5,577	
20/1/2013	Pre Season	Hull Kingston Rovers	H	KC Stadium	L	18-28	T.Briscoe, Galea, Crookes	Holdsworth 3/3	9,887	
27/1/2013	Pre Season	Knights	A	Huntington Stadium	W	60-14	Shaul (2), Nicklas (2), Lineham (2), Crooks, Turgut, J.Briscoe, Stark, Latus	Crooks 8/11	N/A	

== Player appearances ==
- Friendly Games Only

FB=Fullback	C=Centre	W=Winger	SO=Stand Off	SH=Scrum half	P=Prop	H=Hooker	SR=Second Row	LF=Loose forward	B=Bench

No	Player	1	2	3
1	Shannon McDonnell	B	FB	x
2	Jason Crookes	B	W	x
3	Joe Arundel	B	C	x
4	Kirk Yeaman	C	C	x
5	Tom Briscoe	B	W	x
6	Daniel Holdsworth	B	SO	x
7	Brett Seymour	SH	B	x
8	Mark O'Meley	B	P	x
9	Danny Houghton	B	H	x
10	Andy Lynch	B	P	x
11	Gareth Ellis	B	SR	x
12	Danny Tickle	x	x	x
13	Joe Westerman	B	L	x
14	Richard Whiting	SR	x	SR
15	Ben Galea	B	SR	x
16	Richard Horne	SO	B	SO
17	Liam Watts	x	x	x
18	Old Faithful	x	x	x
19	Jay Pitts	L	B	x
20	Paul Johnson	x	B	L
21	Chris Green	P	B	P
22	Josh Bowden	P	B	P
23	Ben Crooks	C	B	C
24	Liam Kent	x	x	x
25	Tom Lineham	W	B	W
26	Danny Nicklas	B	x	SH
27	Jack Briscoe	W	x	C
28	James Cunningham	H	x	H
29	Jamie Shaul	FB	x	FB
30	Dean Hadley	SR	x	SR
31	Alex Starling	B	x	B
32	Ryan Wilson	B	x	B
33	Aaron Heremaia	B	SH	x

= Injured

= Suspended

== Table ==
Super League XVIII
Pos	Team	Pld	W	D	L	PF	PA	PD	Pts	Qualification
1	Huddersfield Giants (L)	27	21	0	6	851	507	+344	42	Play-offs
2	Warrington Wolves	27	20	1	6	836	461	+375	41	Play-offs
3	Leeds Rhinos	27	18	1	8	712	507	+205	37	Play-offs
4	Wigan Warriors (C)	27	17	1	9	816	460	+356	35	Play-offs
5	St. Helens	27	15	1	11	678	536	+142	31	Play-offs
6	Hull F.C.	27	13	2	12	652	563	+89	28	Play-offs
7	Catalans Dragons	27	13	2	12	619	604	+15	28	Play-offs
8	Hull Kingston Rovers	27	13	0	14	642	760	−118	26	Play-offs
9	Bradford Bulls	27	10	2	15	640	658	−18	22	
10	Widnes Vikings	27	10	2	15	695	841	−146	22	
11	Wakefield Trinity Wildcats	27	10	1	16	660	749	−89	21	
12	Castleford Tigers	27	9	2	16	702	881	−179	20	
13	London Broncos	27	5	2	20	487	946	−459	12	
14	Salford City Reds	27	6	1	20	436	953	−517	11 (Note: Salford deducted 2 points on 14 June 2013 for fielding 14 players during home game against Castleford)	

Source: superleague.co.uk and BBC Sport
Rules for classification: 1st on competition points; 2nd on match points difference. Competition points: for win = 2; for draw = 1; for loss = 0.
(C) Champions; (L) League Leaders' Shield Winners

== 2013 fixtures and results ==
LEGEND
Win
Draw
Loss

2013 Engage Super League

Date	Competition	Rnd	Vrs	H/A	Venue	Result	Score	Tries	Goals	Att	Live on TV	Report
1/2/13	Super League XVIII	1	Rhinos	A	Headingley Stadium	L	6-36	Arundel	Holdsworth 1/1	15,297	Sky Sports	
10/2/13	Super League XVIII	2	Bulls	H	KC Stadium	W	28-12	Crookes, McDonnell, T.Briscoe, Holdsworth, Pitts	Holdsworth 4/5	10,952	-	
15/2/13	Super League XVIII	3	Saints	A	Langtree Park	D	22-22	Crookes, McDonnell, T.Briscoe, Whiting	Holdsworth 3/4	11,257	-	
23/2/13	Super League XVIII	4	Wolves	H	KC Stadium	L	10-24	Westerman, Crooks	Crooks 1/1, Westerman 0/1	10,712	Sky Sports	
2/3/13	Super League XVIII	5	Vikings	A	Halton Stadium	L	16-36	Westerman, Galea, Lineham	Westerman 2/3	5,541	Sky Sports	
8/3/13	Super League XVIII	6	Tigers	H	KC Stadium	W	52-0	Horne, Arundel (3), Lineham (3), Houghton, Bowden	Tickle 5/6, Holdsworth 1/1, Westerman 1/1, Arundel 1/1	11,825	-	Report
16/3/13	Super League XVIII	7	Giants	A	Galpharm Stadium	L	10-24	Galea, Crooks	Holdsworth 1/2	5,536	Sky Sports	Report
23/3/13	Super League XVIII	8	Broncos	A	Twickenham Stoop	D	18-18	Galea, Westerman, Horne	Tickle 3/3	1,865	-	Report
29/3/13	Super League XVIII	9	Hull Kingston Rovers	H	KC Stadium	L	10-23	Crooks, Tickle	Tickle 1/2	19,064	Sky Sports	Report
1/4/13	Super League XVIII	10	Wakefield Trinity Wildcats	A	Belle Vue	W	34-22	Shaul (2), Crooks (2), Heremaia, T.Briscoe	Tickle 5/6	8,126	-	Report
7/4/13	Super League XVIII	11	Dragons	H	KC Stadium	W	28-8	Crooks (2), T.Briscoe, Lineham (2)	Tickle 1/1, Westerman 3/4	10,065	-	Report
14/4/13	Super League XVIII	12	Salford City Reds	A	City of Salford Stadium	W	24-18	Crooks, Whiting (2), Lineham	Westerman 4/4	2,000	-	Report
26/4/13	Super League XVIII	13	Warriors	H	KC Stadium	L	20-28	Lineham (3), Crooks	Westerman 2/4	11,403	-	Report
3/5/13	Super League XVIII	14	Broncos	H	KC Stadium	W	48-12	Crooks (2), Whiting, T.Briscoe (2), Yeaman, Westerman, O'Meley	Holdsworth 6/7, Crooks 2/2	11,490	-	Report
19/5/13	Super League XVIII	15	Wolves	A	Halliwell Jones Stadium	W	26-16	T.Briscoe (2), Lineham, Whiting (2)	Holdsworth 3/5	9,387	Sky Sports	Report
25/5/13	Magic Weekend	16	Hull Kingston Rovers	N	Etihad Stadium	W	22-16	Whiting, Lineham, Yeaman, Green	Holdsworth 3/4	30,793	Sky Sports	Report
31/5/13	Super League XVIII	17	Rhinos	H	KC Stadium	W	18-6	Westerman, Crooks, Houghton	Holdsworth 3/5	11,901	Sky Sports	Match Report
8/6/13	Super League XVIII	18	Dragons	A	Stade Gilbert Brutus	L	4-30	Lineham	Holdsworth 0/1	8,105	-	Report
21/6/13	Super League XVIII	19	Tigers	A	The Jungle	L	28-30	Crooks (4), Heremaia (2)	Holdsworth 2/6	6,022	Sky Sports	Match Report
1/7/13	Super League XVIII	20	Wakefield Trinity Wildcats	H	KC Stadium	L	26-27	Crooks (3), Lineham, Yeaman	Holdsworth 1/2, Tickle 2/3	10,000	Sky Sports	Report
7/7/13	Super League XVIII	21	Giants	H	KC Stadium	L	16-22	Green, Yeaman, O'Meley	Westerman 1/2, Tickle 1/1	10,986	-	Report
19/7/13	Super League XVIII	22	Bulls	A	Odsal Stadium	L	12-19	T.Briscoe, Tickle	Tickle 2/2	7,914	Sky Sports	Report
2/8/13	Super League XVIII	23	Vikings	H	KC Stadium	W	72-10	Holdsworth, T.Briscoe (2), Yeaman, Shaul (2), Miller (2), Whiting, Heremaia, Arundel, O'Meley	Tickle 9/9, Westerman 3/3	10,500	-	Report
11/8/13	Super League XVIII	24	Hull Kingston Rovers	A	Craven Park	W	38-20	Miller, Yeaman, Shaul, Arundel, Whiting, T.Briscoe	Tickle 7/7	8,874	Sky Sports	Report
16/8/13	Super League XVIII	25	Salford City Reds	H	KC Stadium	W	18-13	Arundel, Heremaia, Westerman	Tickle 2/2, Westerman 1/1	11,180	-	Report
30/8/13	Super League XVIII	26	Warriors	A	DW Stadium	W	34-33	Crookes (3), T.Briscoe (2), Westerman	Tickle 4/6, Holdsworth 2 DG	12,417	-	Report
6/8/13	Super League XVIII	27	Saints	H	KC Stadium	L	12-38	Whiting, Tickle	Tickle 2/2	11,250	-	Report

== Player appearances ==
- Super League Only

FB=Fullback	C=Centre	W=Winger	SO=Stand-off	SH=Scrum half	PR=Prop	H=Hooker	SR=Second Row	L=Loose forward	B=Bench

No	Player	1	2	3	4	5	6	7	8	9	10	11	12	13	14	15	16	17	18	19	20	21	22	23	24	25	26	27
1	Shannon McDonnell	FB	FB	FB	FB	FB	FB	FB				FB	FB	FB	FB	FB	FB	FB	FB	FB	FB	FB	FB					x
2	Jason Crookes	W	W	W					W	x	B		W	x	x	x	x	x	W	W	x	x	x	x	x	W	W	W
3	Joe Arundel	C	x	x	x	C	C	C	C	C	C	C	C							C	x	C	x	C	C	C	x	x
4	Kirk Yeaman	C	C	C	C	C	C							C	C	C	C	C	C		C	C	C	C	C	C	C	C
5	Tom Briscoe	W	W	W	W	W	W	W	FB	W	W	W		W	W	W	W	W			W	W	W	W	W	W	W	x
6	Daniel Holdsworth	SO	SO	SO			SO	SO							SO	SO	SO	SO	SO	SO	SO			SO	SO	SO	SO	SO
7	Brett Seymour	SH	x	x	x	SO																						
8	Mark O'Meley	B	P	P	P	P	P	P	P	L	B	B	B	B	P	P	P	P		P	P	P	P	P	P		x	x
9	Danny Houghton	H	H	H	H	H	H	H	H	H	H	H	H	H	H	H	H	H	H	H	H	H	H	H	H	H	H	H
10	Andy Lynch	P	P	P	P	P	P	P	P		P	P	P	P	B	B	B	B	B	B	B	B	B	B		B	x	x
11	Gareth Ellis														SR	SR	SR	SR	SR		SR	SR	SR	SR	SR	SR	x	x
12	Danny Tickle				B	B	SR		SR	SR	SR	SR									B	B	SR	SR	SR	SR	SR	SR
13	Joe Westerman	L	SR	SR	L	SR	L	SR	L	SO	L	SR	SR	SR	SR			SR	SR	SR	SR	SR	L	L	L	L	L	SR
14	Richard Whiting	SR	B	B	B	L	B	B	B	FB	B	B	SR	SR	L	L	SR		B	SR		B	B	B	B	B	C	B
15	Ben Galea	SR	SR	SR	SR	SR	SR	SR	SR	SR	SR							B		B	L	L						
16	Richard Horne	x	SH	SH	SO	SH	SH	SH	SO	SH	SO	SO	SO	SO	SH	SH	SH										B	C
17	Liam Watts					B	L		B	P	P	P	P	P	P	P	B	B	P	B	P	B	P	P	P	P	P	P
18	Old Faithful	x	x	x	x	x	x	x	x	x	x	x	x	x	x	x	x	x	x	x	x	x	x	x	x	x	x	x
19	Jay Pitts	P	B	B	B	B		B	B	B		L	L	B	B	SR	L	L	L	L			B	B	B	B	B	B
20	Paul Johnson	B	B	B	B	B			B	B	B			B	B	B	B	B	B		B						B	L
21	Chris Green	B	L	L	SR	x	x	B	x	B	x	x	B	L	x	P	P	P	P	P	x	P	B	x	B	P	B	B
22	Josh Bowden	x	x	x	x	x	B	B	x	P	x	B	B	L	x	B	x	x	B	x	x	x	x	x	x	x	P	P
23	Ben Crooks	x	C	C	C	x	x	C	C	C	C	C	C	C	C	C	C	C	C	C	C		C					x
24	Liam Kent	x	x	x	x	x	x	x	x	x	x	x	x	x	x	x	x	x	x	x	x	x	x	x	x	x	SR	x
25	Tom Lineham	x	x	x	W	W	W	W	W	W	W	W	W	W	W	W	W	W	W	W	W	W	W	W	W			x
26	Danny Nicklas	x	x	x	x	x	x	x	x	x	x	x	x	x	x	x	x	x	x	x	x	x	x	x	x	x	x	x
27	Jack Briscoe	x	x	x	x	x	x	x	x	x	x	x	x	x	x	x	x	x	x	x	x	x	x	x	x	x	x	W
28	James Cunningham	x	x	x	x	x	x	x	x	x	x	x	x	x	x	x	x	x	x	x	x	x	x	x	x	x	x	x
29	Jamie Shaul	x	x	x	x	x	x	x	x	x	FB	x	x	x	x	x	x	x	x	x	x	x	x	FB	FB	FB	FB	FB
30	Dean Hadley	x	x	x	x	x	x	x	x	x	x	B	B	x	x	x	x	x	x	x	x	x	x	x	x	x	x	x
31	Alex Starling	x	x	x	x	x	x	x	x	x	x	x	x	x	x	x	x	x	x	x	x	x	x	x	x	x	x	x
32	Ryan Wilson	x	x	x	x	x	x	x	x	x	x	x	x	x	x	x	x	x	x	x	x	x	x	x	x	x	x	x
33	Aaron Heremaia	B	B	B	SH	B	B		SH	B	SH	SH	SH	SH	B	B	B	SH	SH	B	B	SO	SO	B	B	B	x	B
34	Jacob Miller	x	x	x	x	x	x	x	x	x	x	x	x	x	x	x	x	x	x	SH	SH	SH	SH	SH	SH	SH	SH	SH

= Injured

= Suspended

== Challenge Cup ==
LEGEND
Win
Draw
Loss

Date	Competition	Rnd	Vrs	H/A	Venue	Result	Score	Tries	Goals	Att	TV	Report
21/4/13	Cup	4th	Crusaders	H	KC Stadium	W	62-6	Horne (2), Westerman, Crooks, Yeaman (3), Lineham, Cunningham, Shaul (3)	Westerman 2/3, Crooks 1/2, Heremaia 4/6	3,879	-	Report
10/5/13	Cup	5th	Wakefield Trinity Wildcats	H	KC Stadium	W	24-6	Horne, Ellis, Yeaman, Pitts (2)	Holdsworth 2/5	7,697	-	Report
13/7/13	Cup	QF	Dragons	A	Stade Gilbert Brutus	W	24-13	McDonnell (2), Lineham, T.Briscoe	Westerman 2/2, Tickle 2/3	6,500	BBC Sport	Report
28/7/13	Cup	SF	Wolves	N	Galpharm Stadium	W	16-12	Lineham, Whiting, Heremaia	Tickle 2/3	10,621	BBC Sport	Report
24/8/13	Cup	Final	Warriors	N	Wembley Stadium	L	0-16	-	-	78,137	BBC Sport	Report

== Player appearances ==
- Challenge Cup Games only

FB=Fullback	C=Centre	W=Winger	SO=Stand Off	SH=Scrum half	P=Prop	H=Hooker	SR=Second Row	L=Loose forward	B=Bench

No	Player	4	5	QF	SF	F
1	Shannon McDonnell		FB	FB	FB	
2	Jason Crookes	W	x		x	W
3	Joe Arundel	x	x		C	
4	Kirk Yeaman	C	C	C	C	C
5	Tom Briscoe	x	W	W	W	W
6	Daniel Holdsworth		SO		SO	SO
7	Brett Seymour					
8	Mark O'Meley	x	P	P	P	P
9	Danny Houghton	H	H	H	H	H
10	Andy Lynch	P	B	B	B	B
11	Gareth Ellis		SR	SR	SR	SR
12	Danny Tickle		x	B	SR	SR
13	Joe Westerman	SR	x	SR	L	L
14	Richard Whiting		SR	B	B	B
15	Ben Galea		x	L		
16	Richard Horne	SO	SH			
17	Liam Watts	P	P	B	P	P
18	Old Faithful	x	x	x	x	x
19	Jay Pitts	SR	L		B	B
20	Paul Johnson	B	B			
21	Chris Green	B	B	P		x
22	Josh Bowden	L	x	x	x	x
23	Ben Crooks	C	C	C		C
24	Liam Kent	x	x	x	x	x
25	Tom Lineham	W	W	W	W	
26	Danny Nicklas	x	x	x	x	x
27	Jack Briscoe	B	x	x	x	x
28	James Cunningham	B	x	x	x	x
29	Jamie Shaul	FB	x	x	x	FB
30	Dean Hadley	x	x	x	x	x
31	Alex Starling	x	x	x	x	x
32	Ryan Wilson	x	x	x	x	x
33	Aaron Heremaia	SH	B	SO	B	B
34	Jacob Miller	x	x	SH	SH	SH

== Playoffs ==
LEGEND
Win
Draw
Loss

Date	Competition	Rnd	Vrs	H/A	Venue	Result	Score	Tries	Goals	Att	TV	Report
13/9/13	Play-offs	EPO	Dragons	H	KC Stadium	W	14-4	Shaul, Ellis	Tickle 3/5	4,970	Sky Sports	Report
19/9/13	Play-offs	PSF	Giants	A	Galpharm Stadium	L	18-76	Shaul, T.Briscoe (2)	Tickle 3/3	5,547	Sky Sports	Report

== Player appearances ==
- Play Off Games only

FB=Fullback	C=Centre	W=Winger	SO=Stand Off	SH=Scrum half	P=Prop	H=Hooker	SR=Second Row	L=Loose forward	B=Bench

No	Player	EPO	PSF
1	Shannon McDonnell	x	x
2	Jason Crookes	W	W
3	Joe Arundel	x	x
4	Kirk Yeaman	C	C
5	Tom Briscoe	C	C
6	Daniel Holdsworth	SO	SO
9	Danny Houghton	H	H
10	Andy Lynch	x	B
11	Gareth Ellis	SR	SR
12	Danny Tickle	SR	SR
13	Joe Westerman	L	L
14	Richard Whiting	B	x
16	Richard Horne	C	C
17	Liam Watts	P	P
18	Old Faithful	x	x
19	Jay Pitts	x	B
20	Paul Johnson	P	P
21	Chris Green	B	B
22	Josh Bowden	B	x
23	Ben Crooks	x	x
24	Liam Kent	x	x
25	Tom Lineham	x	x
26	Danny Nicklas	x	x
27	Jack Briscoe	x	x
28	James Cunningham	x	x
29	Jamie Shaul	FB	FB
30	Dean Hadley	x	x
31	Alex Starling	x	x
32	Ryan Wilson	x	x
33	Aaron Heremaia	B	B
34	Jacob Miller	SH	SH

== 2013 squad statistics ==
- Appearances and points include Super League, Challenge Cup and Play Offs as of 21 September 2013.

No	Nat	Player	Position	Age	Previous club	Until End Of	Apps	Tries	Goals	DG	Points
1	(Australia)	Shannon McDonnell	Fullback	0	Hull Kingston Rovers	2013	22	4	0	0	16
2	(England)	Jason Crookes	Wing	0	Bradford Bulls	2013	15	5	0	0	20
3	(England)	Joe Arundel	Centre	0	Castleford Tigers	2013	15	7	1	0	30
4	(England)	Kirk Yeaman	Centre	0	Hull FC	2013	27	10	0	0	40
5	(England)	Tom Briscoe	Wing	0	Hull FC	2013	29	17	0	0	68
6	(Australia)	Daniel Holdsworth	Stand off	0	Salford City Reds	2013	22	2	30	2	70
7	(Australia)	Brett Seymour	Scrum half	0	New Zealand Warriors	2013	2	0	0	0	0
8	(Australia)	Mark O'Meley	Prop	0	Sydney Roosters	2013	27	3	0	0	12
9	(England)	Danny Houghton	Hooker	0	Hull FC	2013	34	2	0	0	8
10	(England)	Andy Lynch	Prop	0	Bradford Bulls	2013	29	0	0	0	0
11	(England)	Gareth Ellis	Second row	0	Wests Tigers	2013	17	2	0	0	8
12	(England)	Danny Tickle	Second row	0	Wigan Warriors	2013	20	3	54	0	120
13	(England)	Joe Westerman	Loose forward	0	Castleford Tigers	2013	31	8	21	0	74
14	(England)	Richard Whiting	Second row	0	Featherstone Rovers	2013	30	11	0	0	44
15	(Australia)	Ben Galea	Prop	0	Hull Kingston Rovers	2013	15	3	0	0	12
16	(England)	Richard Horne	Prop	0	Hull FC	2013	21	5	0	0	20
17	(England)	Liam Watts	Second row	0	Hull Kingston Rovers	2013	29	0	0	0	0
19	(England)	Jay Pitts	Second row	0	Leeds Rhinos	2013	28	3	0	0	12
20	(England)	Paul Johnson	Loose forward	0	Wakefield Trinity Wildcats	2013	21	0	0	0	0
21	(England)	Chris Green	Prop	0	Hull FC	2013	24	2	0	0	8
22	(England)	Josh Bowden	Prop	0	Hull FC	2013	12	1	0	0	4
23	(England)	Ben Crooks	Centre	0	Hull FC	2013	22	20	4	0	88
24	(England)	Liam Kent	Prop	0	Hull FC	2013	1	0	0	0	0
25	(England)	Tom Lineham	Wing	0	Hull FC	2013	25	17	0	0	68
26	(England)	Danny Nicklas	Scrum half	0	Hull FC	2013	0	0	0	0	0
27	(England)	Jack Briscoe	Stand off	0	Hull FC	2013	2	0	0	0	0
28	(England)	James Cunningham	Hooker	0	Hull FC	2013	1	1	0	0	4
29	(England)	Jamie Shaul	Fullback	0	Hull FC	2013	10	10	0	0	40
30	(England)	Dean Hadley	Prop	0	Hull FC	2013	2	0	0	0	0
31	(England)	Alex Starling	Prop	0	Hull FC	2013	0	0	0	0	0
32	(England)	Ryan Wilson	Prop	0	Hull FC	2013	0	0	0	0	0
33	(New Zealand)	Aaron Heremaia	Scrum half	0	New Zealand Warriors	2013	32	6	4	0	32
34	(Australia)	Jacob Miller	Scrum half	20	Wests Tigers	2013	14	3	0	0	12

= Injured = Suspended

== Out of contract 2013 ==
Players out of contract in 2013:

== 2013 transfers in/out ==
In

	Name	Position	Signed from	Date
(England)	Jay Pitts	Loose forward	Leeds Rhinos	March 2012
(England)	Gareth Ellis	Second row	Wests Tigers	March 2012
(England)	Joe Arundel	Centre	Castleford Tigers	May 2012
(England)	Liam Watts	Prop	Hull Kingston Rovers	June 2012
(Australia)	Daniel Holdsworth	Stand off	Salford City Reds	September 2012
(Australia)	Ben Galea	Second row	Hull Kingston Rovers	September 2012
(England)	Jason Crookes	Wing	Bradford Bulls	September 2012
(England)	Paul Johnson	Prop	Wakefield Trinity Wildcats	September 2012
(Australia)	Shannon McDonnell	Fullback	Hull Kingston Rovers	October 2012

Out

	Name	Position	Club Signed	Date
(Australia)	Wade McKinnon	Fullback	Released	May 2012
(England)	Jordan Turner	Centre	St Helens R.F.C.	May 2012
(England)	Eamon O'Carroll	Prop	Widnes Vikings	June 2012
(Tonga)	Willie Manu	Second row	St Helens R.F.C.	June 2012
(England)	Jamie Ellis	Scrum half	Castleford Tigers	July 2012
(England)	Laurence Pearce	Second row	Switched Codes to Rotherham Titans RU	June 2012
(Australia)	Tony Martin	Centre	Retirement	August 2012
(Tonga)	Sam Moa	Prop	Sydney Roosters	August 2012
(England)	Will Sharp	Wing	Released	September 2012
(England)	Liam Cunningham	Centre	Released	September 2012
(England)	Lewis Brown	Centre	Released	September 2012
(England)	Mike Burnett	Second row	Released	September 2012
(England)	Reece Lyne	Fullback	Wakefield Trinity Wildcats	October 2012
