= 2013 Challenge Cup final =

Rugby league match in the United Kingdom

2013 Challenge Cup Final
Hull F.C.	Wigan Warriors
0	16
	1	2	Total
HFC	0	0	0
WIG	6	10	16
- Date: 24 August 2013
- Stadium: Wembley Stadium, London
- Location: London, United Kingdom
- Lance Todd Trophy: Matty Smith
- God Save The Queen and Abide with Me: BLAKE
- Referee: Phil Bentham
- Attendance: 78,137

Broadcast partners
- Broadcasters: BBC One

The 2013 Challenge Cup Final was the 112th cup-deciding game of the rugby league 2013 Challenge Cup Season. It was held at Wembley Stadium in London on 24 August 2013, kick off 15:00. The final was contested by Hull F.C. and the Wigan Warriors. The game saw Wigan Warriors beat Hull F.C. by 16 points to nill.

== Background ==
The 2013 Challenge Cup Final marks Wigan Warriors's fifth final of the Super League era and Hull F.C.'s third. In addition it is the third time the two sides had met in the competition, with Wigan Warriors winning in both previous meetings during the 1958–59 Challenge Cup Final and 1984–85 Challenge Cup Final. Wigan had previously won a record 18 challenge cup finals compared to Hull's four.

== Route to the final ==
=== Hull F.C. ===
As a 2012 Super League team, Hull F.C. entered in at the fourth round. They drew eventual Championship 1 champions North Wales Crusaders thrashing them by 62 points to 6. The fifth round saw Hull face Super League side Wakefield Trinity, beating them comfortably 24 points to 6. The quarter finals saw them face Catalans Dragons winning 24–13. The semi-finals saw Hull F.C. draw eventual Super League runners-up Warrington Wolves, winning by a tight margin of 16–12.

Round	Opposition	Score
4th	North Wales Crusaders (H)	62–6
5th	Wakefield Trinity (H)	24–6
QF	Catalans Dragons (A)	24–13
SF	Warrington Wolves (N)	16–12

=== Wigan Warriors ===
As a 2012 Super League team, Wigan Warriors also entered in at the fourth round. A fourth round thrashing of Leigh Centurions 60 points to 10 placed them in the fifth round where a comfortable victory over Super League side Hull KR, beating them 46 points to 14. Warriors faced Widnes Vikings in the quarter finals, thrashing them 48 points to 4 Wigan then faced London Broncos in the semi-finals, nilling them by 70 points.

Round	Opposition	Score
4th	Leigh Centurions (H)	60–10
5th	Hull KR (A)	46–14
QF	Widnes Vikings (H)	48–4
SF	London Broncos (N)	70–0

== Pre-match ==
The pre-match entertainment was headlined by British classical crossover band BLAKE, who also sang the Challenge Cup and FA Cup Final anthem - "Abide with Me". At the end of their set, BLAKE were joined on the field by British soprano Natalie Coyle to sing the national anthem - "God Save the Queen".

== Match details ==
Saturday, 24 August
15:00

Hull F.C.	0 - 16	Wigan Warriors
	Report	Tries; Iain Thornley ('21); Sam Tomkins ('80); Goals; Pat Richards ('21, '43, '62, '80)

Wembley Stadium, London
Attendance: 78,137
Referee: (England) Phil Bentham
Player of the Match: (England) Matty Smith

Hull F.C.	Posit.		Wigan Warriors
Jamie Shaul	.	.	Sam Tomkins
Jason Crookes	.	.	Josh Charnley
Ben Crooks	.	.	Darrell Goulding
Kirk Yeaman	.	.	Iain Thornley
Tom Briscoe	.	.	Pat Richards
Daniel Holdsworth	.	.	Blake Green
Freddie Miller	.	.	Matty Smith
Mark O'Meley	.	.	Ben Flower
Danny Houghton	.	.	Michael McIlorum
Liam Watts	.	.	Lee Mossop
Gareth Ellis (c)	.	.	Harrison Hansen
Danny Tickle	.	.	Liam Farrell
Joe Westerman	.	.	Sean O'Loughlin (c)
Richard Whiting	Int.		Gil Dudson
Andy Lynch	Int.		Scott Taylor
Aaron Heremaia	Int.		Chris Tuson
Jay Pitts	Int.		Logan Tomkins
Peter Gentle	Coach		Shaun Wane

== Post match ==
Wigan's win meant that their record Challenge Cup titles was extended to 19 wins in the competition since their first win in 1923–24.
