= 2017 Challenge Cup final =

Rugby league match in the United Kingdom

2017 Challenge Cup Final
Hull F.C.	Wigan Warriors
18	14
	1	2	Total
HFC	12	6	18
WIG	10	4	14
- Date: 26 August 2017
- Stadium: Wembley Stadium, London
- Location: London, United Kingdom
- Lance Todd Trophy: Marc Sneyd (HFC)
- God Save The Queen and Abide with Me: Laura Wright
- Referee: Phil Bentham
- Attendance: 68,525

Broadcast partners
- Broadcasters: BBC One

The 2017 Challenge Cup Final was the 116th cup-deciding game of the rugby league 2017 Challenge Cup Season. It was held at Wembley Stadium in London on 26 August 2017, kick off 15:00. The final was contested by Hull F.C. and the Wigan Warriors. The game saw Hull F.C. beat Wigan by 18 points to 14.

== Background ==
The 2017 Challenge Cup Final marks Wigan Warriors's fifth final of the Super League era and Hull F.C.'s fifth. In addition it is the fourth time the two sides had met in the competition, having met previously in the 1958–59 Challenge Cup Final, 1984–85 Challenge Cup Final, and 2013 Challenge Cup Final, with the Warriors winning 16–0 in their most recent meeting in addition to winning both finals in the pre-Super League era. Wigan had previously won a record 19 challenge cup finals compared to Hull's four.

== Route to the final ==
=== Hull F.C. ===
Hull's sixth round draw saw them nil Catalans Dragons scoring 62 points. The quarter finals saw them beat eventual Super League Grand Finalists Castleford Tigers 32 points to 24. In the semi-final they beat eventual Super League Champions Leeds Rhinos 43 points to 24.

Round	Opposition	Score
6th	Catalans Dragons (H)	62–0
QF	Castleford Tigers (H)	32–24
SF	Leeds Rhinos (N)	43–24

=== Wigan Warriors ===
Wigan's sixth round draw saw a comfortable win over Championship side Swinton Lions before a tight win by a single point against local rivals Warrington Wolves. The semi-finals saw a 27 point to 14 victory over fellow Greater Manchester side Salford Red Devils.

Round	Opposition	Score
6th	Swinton Lions (A)	42–12
QF	Warrington Wolves (A)	27–26
SF	Salford Red Devils (N)	27–14

== Pre-match ==
=== Fan zone ===
The 2017 Challenge Cup Final was the first Challenge Cup Final to have a fan zone before and during the match. The 2,000 capacity fan zone was located outside of Wembley Arena and contained ale and larger bars as well as street food vendors. House music band Conquer Rio performed at the event in addition to a small number of players making an appearance before the match.

=== Ticketing ===
Over 20,000 seats in Wembley were priced at under £30 with children's tickets starting at £5. Families of four could attend for £50. All in all, this made the event a relatively cheap sporting fixture in the UK.

== Match details ==
2017 Challenge Cup Final

Saturday, 26 August
15:00 BST (UTC+1)

Hull F.C.	18 – 14	Wigan Warriors
Tries: 3 Fonua 20', 47'; Talanoa 12'; Goals: 3 Sneyd 12', 20', 47' (3/3)	1st: 12–10; 2nd: 6–4; Report	Tries: 3 Bateman 4'; Gildart 32'; Burgess 73'; Goals: 1 Williams 4' (1/3)

Wembley Stadium, London
Attendance: 68,525
Referee: (England) Phil Bentham
Lance Todd Trophy: Marc Sneyd (Hull F.C.)

Hull F.C.	Posit.		Wigan Warriors
Jamie Shaul	.	.	Sam Tomkins
Mahe Fonua	.	.	Liam Marshall
Josh Griffin	.	.	Anthony Gelling
Carlos Tuimavave	.	.	Oliver Gildart
Fetuli Talanoa	.	.	Joe Burgess
Albert Kelly	.	.	George Williams
Marc Sneyd	.	.	Thomas Leuluai
Liam Watts	.	.	Frank-Paul Nu'uausala
Danny Houghton	.	.	Michael McIlorum
Scott Taylor	.	.	Tony Clubb
Sika Manu	.	.	John Bateman
Mark Minichiello	.	.	Liam Farrell
Gareth Ellis (c)	.	.	Sean O'Loughlin (c)
Chris Green	Int.		Willie Isa
Danny Washbrook	Int.		Ryan Sutton
Josh Bowden	Int.		Sam Powell
Jake Connor	Int.		Taulima Tautai
Lee Radford	Coach		Shaun Wane

== Post-match ==
Unfortunately for the development of rugby league in the British Isles, the 2017 Challenge Cup Final saw the lowest attendance of the new Wembley era, beginning with the 2007 Final, of only 68,525.
