= 2016 Challenge Cup final =

Rugby league match in the United Kingdom

2016 Challenge Cup Final
Hull F.C.	Warrington Wolves
12	10
	1	2	Total
HFC	0	12	12
WAR	6	4	10
- Date: 27 August 2016
- Stadium: Wembley Stadium, London
- Location: London, United Kingdom
- Harry Sunderland Trophy: Marc Sneyd
- God Save The Queen and Abide with Me: Aled Jones
- Referee: Gareth Hewer
- Attendance: 76,235

Broadcast partners
- Broadcasters: BBC One

The 2016 Challenge Cup Final was the 115th cup-deciding game of the rugby league 2016 Challenge Cup Season. It was held at Wembley Stadium in London on 27 August 2016, kick off 15:00. The final was contested by Hull F.C. and the Warrington Wolves. The game saw Hull F.C. beat Warrington by 12 points to 10.

== Route to the final ==
=== Hull F.C. ===
Hull's sixth round tie saw a comfortable 47–18 point win over St Helens, before playing a 22–8 victory over Catalans Dragons in the quarter finals. The semi-finals saw them beat eventual Grand Final Champions Wigan Warriors to reach the final.

Round	Opposition	Score
6th	St Helens (A)	47–18
QF	Catalans Dragons (H)	22–8
SF	Wigan Warriors (N)	16–12

=== Warrington Wolves ===
Warrington's sixth round tie saw them play Championship side Oldham Roughyeds, beating them by sixty points. The quarter finals and semi-finals saw the Warriors draw fellow Super League sides Widnes Vikings and Wakefield Trinity respectively. The Wolves escaped the quarters by two points before a comfortable win against Wakefield put them in the final.

Round	Opposition	Score
6th	Oldham (A)	70–10
QF	Widnes Vikings (H)	20–18
SF	Wakefield Trinity (N)	56–12

== Pre-match ==
A military brass band provided musical entertainment before Welsh singer Aled Jones led the RFL Community Choir in singing "Abide with Me" before the match.

== Match details ==
Saturday, 27 August
15:00

Hull F.C.	12 - 10	Warrington Wolves
Tries; Mahe Fonua ('62); Jamie Shaul ('73); Goals; Marc Sneyd ('62, '73)	Report	Tries; Matty Russell ('34); Ben Currie ('54); Goals; Kurt Gidley ('34)

Wembley Stadium, London
Attendance: 76,235
Referee: Gareth Hewer
Player of the Match: (England) Marc Sneyd

Hull F.C.	Posit.		Warrington Wolves
1 Jamie Shaul	.	.	6 Stefan Ratchford
19 Steven Michaels	.	.	5 Matty Russell
2 Mahe Fonua	.	.	24 Toby King
24 Kirk Yeaman	.	.	4 Ryan Atkins
5 Fetuli Talanoa	.	.	3 Rhys Evans
3 Carlos Tuimavave	.	.	1 Kurt Gidley
7 Marc Sneyd	.	.	7 Chris Sandow
8 Scott Taylor	.	.	8 Chris Hill (c)
9 Danny Houghton	.	.	9 Daryl Clark
10 Liam Watts	.	.	10 Ashton Sims
21 Sika Manu	.	.	11 Ben Currie
12 Mark Minichiello	.	.	12 Jack Hughes
11 Gareth Ellis (c)	.	.	14 Joe Westerman
22 Josh Bowden	Int.		16 Brad Dwyer
23 Frank Pritchard	Int.		18 George King
30 Danny Washbrook	Int.		13 Ben Westwood
15 Chris Green	Int.		33 Ryan Bailey
Lee Radford	Coach		Tony Smith
