= 2014 Hull FC season =

Team information
- Chairman: Adam Pearson
- Head Coach: Lee Radford
- Captain: Gareth Ellis
- Stadium: KC Stadium
← 2013	List of seasons	2015 →

This article details the Hull F.C. rugby league football club's 2014 season. This is the 19th season of the Super League era.

== Pre season friendlies ==
LEGEND
Win
Draw
Loss

Hull FC score is first.

Date	Competition	Vrs	H/A	Venue	Result	Score	Tries	Goals	Att	Report
12/1/2014	Pre Season	Doncaster	A	Keepmoat Stadium	D	16-16	Arundel, Bowden, Hadley	Miller 2/3	1,734	Report
19/1/2014	Pre Season	Bradford Bulls	A	Odsal Stadium	L	18-30	Shaul, Bowden, Rankin	Westerman 3/3	2,472	Report
26/1/2014	Pre Season	Hull Kingston Rovers	H	KC Stadium	W	20-12	Crooks (2), Talanoa, Paea	Westerman 2/4	9,983	Report
2/1/2014	Pre Season	Featherstone Rovers	A	Bigfellas Stadium	X	X	X	X	X	X

== Table ==
Super League XIX
Pos	Team	Pld	W	D	L	PF	PA	PD	Pts	Qualification
1	St Helens (L, C)	27	19	0	8	796	563	+233	38	Play-offs
2	Wigan Warriors	27	18	1	8	834	429	+405	37	Play-offs
3	Huddersfield Giants	27	17	3	7	785	626	+159	37	Play-offs
4	Castleford Tigers	27	17	2	8	814	583	+231	36	Play-offs
5	Warrington Wolves	27	17	1	9	793	515	+278	35	Play-offs
6	Leeds Rhinos	27	15	2	10	685	421	+264	32	Play-offs
7	Catalans Dragons	27	14	1	12	733	667	+66	29	Play-offs
8	Widnes Vikings	27	13	1	13	611	725	−114	27	Play-offs
9	Hull Kingston Rovers	27	10	3	14	627	665	−38	23	
10	Salford Red Devils	27	11	1	15	608	695	−87	23	
11	Hull F.C.	27	10	2	15	653	586	+67	22	
12	Wakefield Trinity Wildcats	27	10	1	16	557	750	−193	21	
13	Bradford Bulls (R)	27	8	0	19	512	984	−472	10 (Note: Bradford Bulls deducted 6 points on 25 February 2014 for entering administration)	Relegation to Championship
14	London Broncos (R)	27	1	0	26	438	1237	−799	2	Relegation to Championship

(C) Champions; (L) League Leaders' Shield Winners; (R) Relegated

== Regular season results ==
Date	Competition	Rnd	Vrs	H/A	Venue	Result	Score	Tries	Goals	Att	Live on TV	Report
14/2/14	Super League XIX	1	Catalans Dragons	H	KC Stadium	X	X	X	X	X	X	X
21/2/14	Super League XIX	2	St. Helens	A	Langtree Park	X	X	X	X	X	X	X
2/3/14	Super League XIX	3	Warrington Wolves	A	Halliwell Jones Stadium	X	X	X	X	X	X	X
7/3/14	Super League XIX	4	Bradford Bulls	H	KC Stadium	X	X	X	X	X	X	X
16/3/14	Super League XIX	5	Castleford Tigers	A	Mend-A-Hose Jungle	X	X	X	X	X	X	X
23/3/14	Super League XIX	6	Widnes Vikings	H	KC Stadium	X	X	X	X	X	X	X
28/3/14	Super League XIX	7	Salford Red Devils	H	KC Stadium	X	X	X	X	X	X	X
10/4/14	Super League XIX	8	Huddersfield Giants	H	KC Stadium	X	X	X	X	X	X	X
17/4/14	Super League XIX	9	Hull Kingston Rovers	A	New Craven Park	X	X	X	X	X	X	X
21/4/14	Super League XIX	10	London Broncos	H	KC Stadium	X	X	X	X	X	X	X
4/5/14	Super League XIX	11	Wakefield Trinity Wildcats	H	KC Stadium	X	X	X	X	X	X	X
9/5/14	Super League XIX	12	Wigan Warriors	H	KC Stadium	X	X	X	X	X	X	X
17-18/5/14	Super League XIX	13	Hull Kingston Rovers	N	Etihad Stadium	X	X	X	X	X	X	X
23/5/14	Super League XIX	14	Leeds Rhinos	A	Headingley Carnegie	X	X	X	X	X	X	X
31/5/14	Super League XIX	15	London Broncos	A	The Hive Stadium	X	X	X	X	X	X	X
15/6/14	Super League XIX	16	Widnes Vikings	A	Select Security Stadium	X	X	X	X	X	X	X
22/6/14	Super League XIX	17	Catalans Dragons	A	Stade Gilbert Brutus	X	X	X	X	X	X	X
29/6/14	Super League XIX	18	Wakefield Trinity Wildcats	A	The Rapid Solicitors Stadium	X	X	X	X	X	X	X
4/7/14	Super League XIX	19	Warrington Wolves	H	KC Stadium	X	X	X	X	X	X	X
13/7/14	Super League XIX	20	Salford Red Devils	A	AJ Bell Stadium	X	X	X	X	X	X	X
18/7/14	Super League XIX	21	Wigan Warriors	A	DW Stadium	X	X	X	X	X	X	X
25/7/14	Super League XIX	22	Castleford Tigers	H	KC Stadium	X	X	X	X	X	X	X
1/8/14	Super League XIX	23	St. Helens	H	KC Stadium	X	X	X	X	X	X	X
17/8/14	Super League XIX	24	Bradford Bulls	A	Odsal Stadium	X	X	X	X	X	X	X
29/8/14	Super League XIX	25	Hull Kingston Rovers	H	KC Stadium	X	X	X	X	X	X	X
7/9/13	Super League XIX	26	Huddersfield Giants	A	John Smith's Stadium	X	X	X	X	X	X	X
12/9/14	Super League XIX	27	Leeds Rhinos	H	KC Stadium	X	X	X	X	X	X	X
