= England A =

England A may refer to the following second-string England national sports teams:

- England A (cricket), since 2007 called the England Lions
- England A (rugby league), since 2011 superseded by the England Knights
- England A (rugby union), since 2006 called the England Saxons

== See also ==
- England B national football team
