= England national rugby team =

England national rugby team may refer to:

== Rugby union ==
- England national rugby union team, administered by the Rugby Football Union
- England women's national rugby union team, administered by the Rugby Football Union
- England national rugby sevens team compete in the World Sevens Series
- England women's national rugby sevens team compete in the World Sevens Series

== Rugby league ==
- England national rugby league team, often nicknamed the Three Lions, administered by the Rugby Football League
- England Knights, formerly Emerging England or England 'A'
- England women's national rugby league team

England national rugby league team may erroneously refer to:

- Great Britain national rugby league team, nicknamed the Lions, representing the entirety of the British Isles, also administered by the Rugby Football League
