= Joe Westerman =

England international rugby league footballer

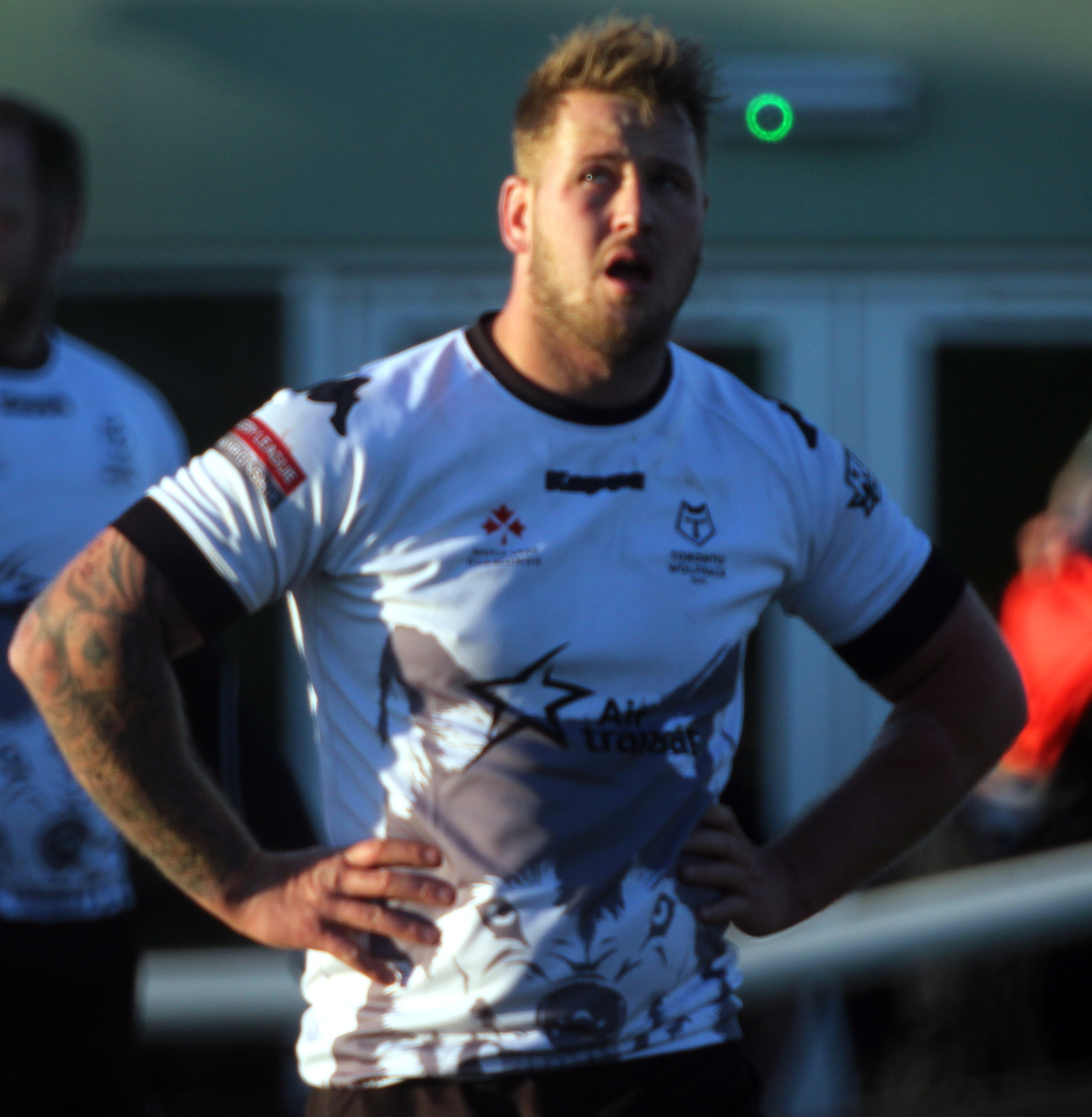

Personal information
- Born: 15 November 1989 (age 36) Pontefract, West Yorkshire, England
- Height: 6 ft 4 in (1.93 m)
- Weight: 17 st 7 lb (111 kg)

Playing information
- Position: Loose forward, Prop, Stand-off
Club
Years	Team	Pld	T	G	FG	P
2007–10	Castleford Tigers	103	43	175	0	522
2011–15	Hull F.C.	128	29	59	1	235
2016–17	Warrington Wolves	53	12	0	0	48
2018	Toronto Wolfpack	5	0	0	0	0
2018–19	Hull F.C.	32	10	0	0	40
2020–21	Wakefield Trinity	34	7	0	0	28
2022–	Castleford Tigers	110	5	0	0	20
	Total	465	106	234	1	893
Representative
Years	Team	Pld	T	G	FG	P
2011	England Knights	1	0	0	0	0
2014–21	England	2	0	0	0	0
- Source: As of 5 April 2026

Joe Westerman (born 15 November 1989) is an English professional rugby league footballer who plays as a loose forward for the Castleford Tigers in the Super League. He played for the England Knights and England at international level.

He has previously played for Castleford Tigers, Hull FC, Warrington Wolves and Wakefield Trinity in the Super League, and for Toronto Wolfpack in the RFL Championship.

== Background ==
Westerman was born in Pontefract, West Yorkshire, England.

Westerman grew up supporting Castleford Tigers and has been a fan of the club since he was 6 years old.

He played junior rugby league for Castleford Lock Lane and Featherstone Lions.

== Club career ==
=== Castleford Tigers ===
Westerman burst onto the scene in 2007 in Castleford's National League One campaign. He featured in the majority of the Tigers games and scored two tries in the National League One Grand Final at Headingley. Westerman was named National League One Young Player of the Year.

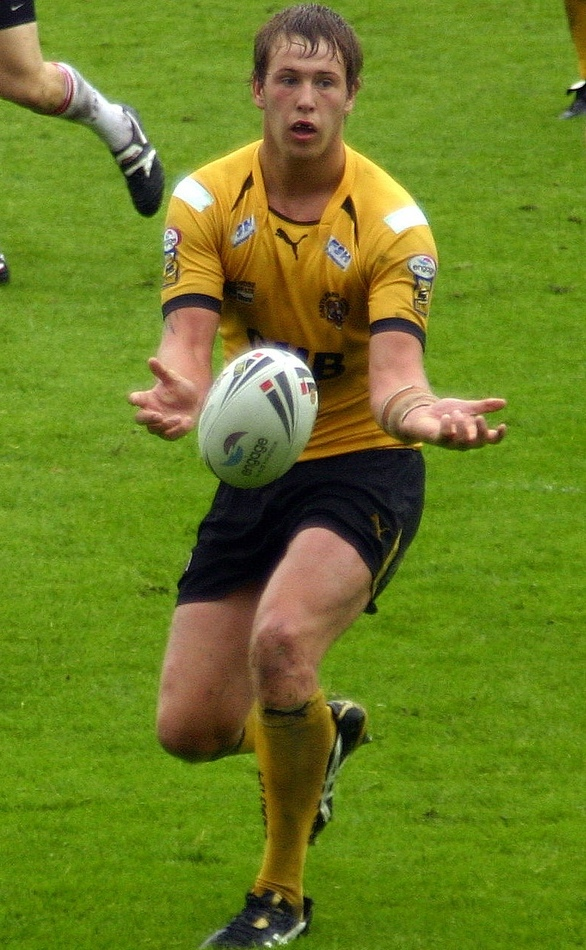
Westerman playing for the Castleford Tigers in 2008

In 2008, Westerman had a great first season in the Super League for Castleford scoring 12 tries in 25 games. He was tipped for being a future England RL international. In recognition of his excellent form, he was named Super League Young Player of the Year.

In April 2009, Westerman suffered a head injury against St Helens in the Super League and received treatment on-field after going into spasms. He was taken to Pinderfields Hospital where scans revealed no serious injury, and within weeks had been signed off to return to playing.

=== Hull F.C. ===
Westerman was Hull F.C.'s marquee signing for the 2011 Super League season, with the Black and Whites paying a club record fee to secure the services of the former Castleford Tigers man.

=== Warrington Wolves ===
In October 2015, Westerman signed a 3-year contract with Warrington for a fee of £150,000.

He played in the 2016 Challenge Cup Final defeat by Hull F.C. at Wembley Stadium.

He played in the 2016 Super League Grand Final defeat by the Wigan Warriors at Old Trafford.

=== Toronto Wolfpack ===
Upon promotion from League 1 in 2017, Westerman signed with Rugby League's first trans-Atlantic team, the Toronto Wolfpack, on 1 October 2017. Westerman joined fellow Wolves teammate Ashton Sims for the 2018 season, who signed with the Wolfpack less than a month prior.

In April 2018 Westerman was released by Toronto Wolfpack after making only 4 appearances for the club. The decision to allow Westerman to leave for free raised eyebrows given he was less than 6 months into a three-year contract and the Wolfpack had paid a transfer fee of £130,000 to secure his services.

=== Return to Hull F.C. ===
Westerman returned to Hull FC in April 2018 despite interest from other clubs. He cited coach Lee Radford and his love for Hull FC as reasons for his choice.

In the local derby in June 2019 against Hull Kingston Rovers, he dislocated his knee in a tackle only to slap it back in place and continue playing.

=== Wakefield Trinity ===
Westerman signed a two-year deal with Wakefield Trinity ahead of the 2020 Super League season.

=== Return to Castleford Tigers ===
In June 2021, it was announced that Westerman would return to his boyhood club, the Castleford Tigers, on a two-year deal from the 2022 season. He would be working alongside former coach Lee Radford once again, as well as playing for the team he supported as a child. Commenting on the news, he said, "The standard is really high now and I just want to get there and play well for my hometown club next year."

Westerman made his second Castleford debut on 11 February 2022 against the Salford Red Devils. He was voted the Fans' Man of the Match for the first two rounds of the season against Salford and Warrington. Following another two Man of the Match performances against Wigan and Leeds in March, head coach Radford called Westerman "the best 13 in the competition". His standout personal year saw him dominate the club's end-of-season awards, being named Directors' Player of the Year, Players' Player of the Year, and Club Player of the Year.

In the 2023 season, Westerman made twenty-three appearances for Castleford and scored one try against the Leigh Leopards. He served as acting captain during the final months of the season due to the injury absence of Paul McShane. He was named as Players' Player of the Year and Club Player of the Year, retaining the awards for the second consecutive year. In September, Westerman signed a two-year contract extension with the Tigers and said, "I always wanted to end my career at Cas." Director of rugby Danny Wilson said, "As a person, he's Castleford through and through. He wears his heart on his sleeve when he plays and he's been our best player for the last two years."

Ahead of the 2024 season, Westerman was appointed Castleford co-captain alongside Paul McShane by new head coach Craig Lingard. He scored a try against the Salford Red Devils on 25 February, and a second try weeks later against the Catalans Dragons on 16 March.

In December 2024, new head coach Danny McGuire named Westerman in Castleford's senior leadership group for the 2025 season, with Sam Wood succeeding both him and the departing McShane as captain. He played twenty-four matches for Castleford throughout the season as the club finished 11th on the table. In November, he signed a further one-year contract extension with the Tigers.

In April 2026, Westerman suffered two concussion injuries within a month against St Helens and Wakefield. After experiencing ongoing head injury symptoms, he was stood down from playing duties under concussion protocols. By July, he had returned to training and was reportedly available for selection, although did not make any appearances during the rest of the year. On 9 September 2026, Castleford announced the departure of five players at the conclusion of their contracts, with Westerman stated to be retiring. However, this statement was later removed and reissued with Westerman omitted from the outgoing list, and included in the listed squad.

== International career ==
Westerman played for and captained the England Knights in their 38-18 victory against France at the Leigh Sports Village on 15 October 2011.

Westerman made his senior international debut on 25 October 2014, starting in England's 32-26 victory against Samoa at the Suncorp Stadium in the 2014 Four Nations.

Westerman made a return to the England team on 25 June 2021, playing against the Combined Nations All Stars at the Halliwell Jones Stadium.

== Club statistics ==
Appearances and points in all competitions by year
Club	Season	Tier	App	T	G	DG	Pts
Castleford Tigers	2007	National League One	24	12	20	0	88
Castleford Tigers	2008	Super League	25	12	28	0	104
Castleford Tigers	2009	Super League	28	9	41	0	118
Castleford Tigers	2010	Super League	26	10	86	0	212
Castleford Tigers	2022	Super League	29	1	0	0	4
Castleford Tigers	2023	Super League	23	1	0	0	4
Castleford Tigers	2024	Super League	26	3	0	0	12
Castleford Tigers	2025	Super League	24	0	0	0	0
Castleford Tigers	2026	Super League	8	0	0	0	0
Castleford Tigers	Total		213	48	175	0	542
Hull F.C.	2011	Super League	28	10	23	0	86
Hull F.C.	2012	Super League	18	5	2	0	24
Hull F.C.	2013	Super League	31	8	21	0	74
Hull F.C.	2014	Super League	28	3	13	1	39
Hull F.C.	2015	Super League	23	3	0	0	12
Hull F.C.	2018	Super League	6	0	0	0	0
Hull F.C.	2019	Super League	26	10	0	0	40
Hull F.C.	Total		160	39	59	1	275
Warrington Wolves	2016	Super League	34	10	0	0	40
Warrington Wolves	2017	Super League	19	2	0	0	8
Warrington Wolves	Total		53	12	0	0	48
Toronto Wolfpack	2018	Championship	5	0	0	0	0
Wakefield Trinity	2020	Super League	17	4	0	0	16
Wakefield Trinity	2021	Super League	17	3	0	0	12
Wakefield Trinity	Total		34	7	0	0	28
Career total			465	106	234	1	893

As of match played 5 April 2026

== Personal life ==
In February 2023, Castleford Tigers fined Westerman after an online video was released showing him performing a sex act in public on a woman, who was not his wife. The club also ordered Westerman to help educate young people on the effects of alcohol and "dangers of social media when in the public eye". Westerman issued a statement, saying "I'd also like to apologise to the supporters, sponsors, staff, and directors of Castleford Tigers as well as my team-mates. I'd like to extend this apology to the game of rugby league, and I have realised that I need to work on my decision-making around alcohol."

Westerman is a lifelong supporter of both Manchester United and Castleford Tigers.
