= Liam Watts =

English rugby league footballer

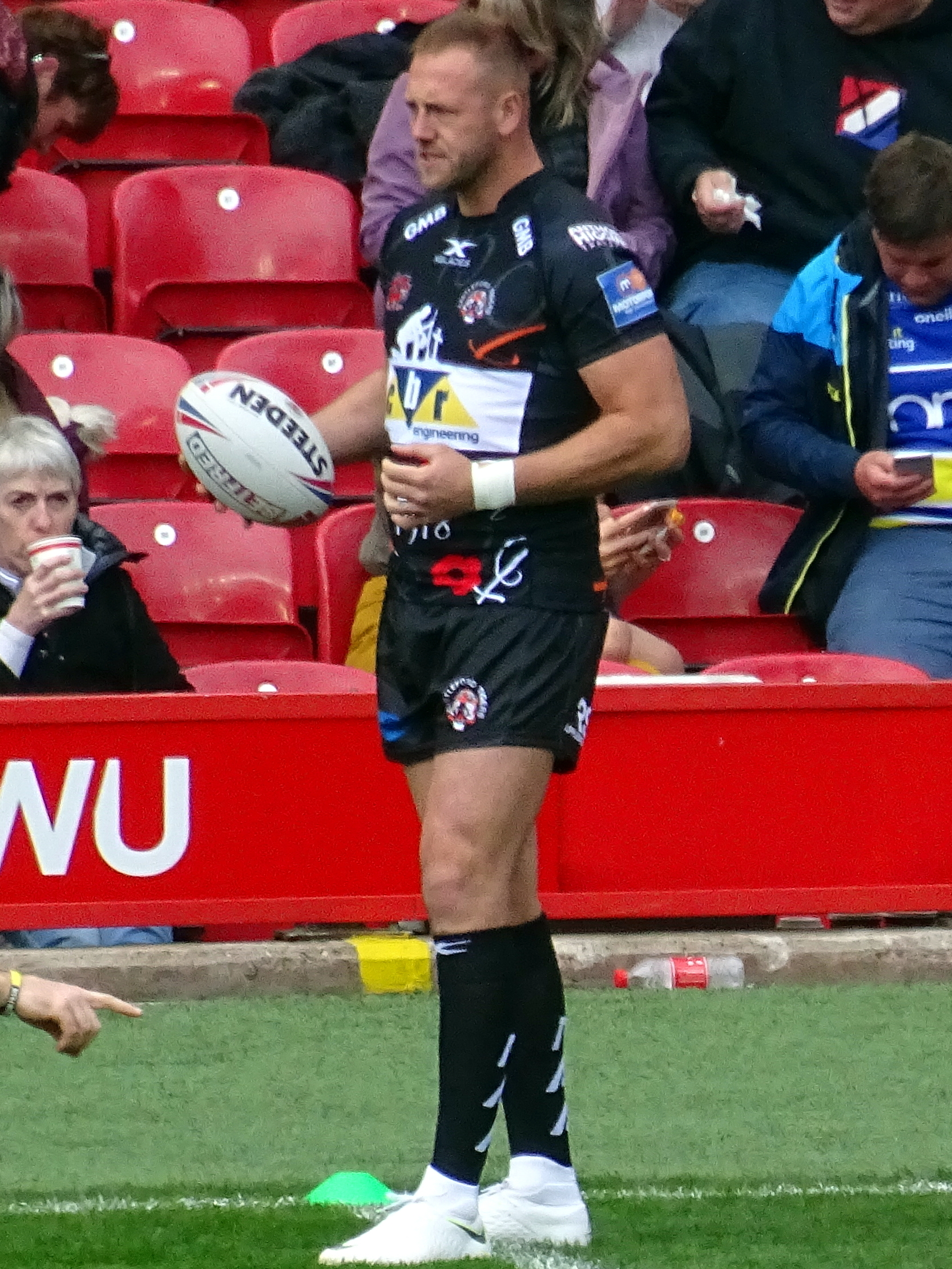

Personal information
- Born: 8 July 1990 (age 35) Featherstone, West Yorkshire, England
- Height: 6 ft 4 in (1.93 m)
- Weight: 17 st 0 lb (108 kg)

Playing information
- Position: Prop
Club
Years	Team	Pld	T	G	FG	P
2007	Castleford Tigers	1	1	0	0	4
2008–12	Hull Kingston Rovers	63	7	0	0	28
2009(loan)	→ Gateshead Thunder	12	1	0	0	4
2012–18	Hull FC	152	11	0	0	44
2014(loan)	→ Doncaster RLFC	3	1	0	0	4
2018–25	Castleford Tigers	147	9	0	0	36
2025	Hull FC	8	0	0	0	0
2026–	Goole Vikings	14	2	2	0	12
	Total	400	32	2	0	132
Representative
Years	Team	Pld	T	G	FG	P
2011	England Knights	1	0	0	0	0
- Source: As of 11 May 2026

Liam Watts (born 8 July 1990) is an English professional rugby league footballer who plays as a prop forward for the Goole Vikings in the RFL Championship. He is an England Knights international.

He has previously played for Hull Kingston Rovers and Hull FC in the Super League. He has spent time on loan at Gateshead Thunder and Doncaster RLFC in the RFL Championship.

== Background ==
Watts was born in Featherstone, West Yorkshire, England, and he was a junior at Featherstone Lions.

== Career ==
=== Castleford Tigers ===
Watts made his first team debut and scored a try for the Castleford Tigers in an 88-10 victory over Castleford Lock Lane in the Challenge Cup third round on 11 March 2007.

=== Hull Kingston Rovers ===
He made his Hull Kingston Rovers debut in a Challenge Cup fourth round tie in April 2008, and signed a two-year contract until the end of the 2010 season in June 2008.

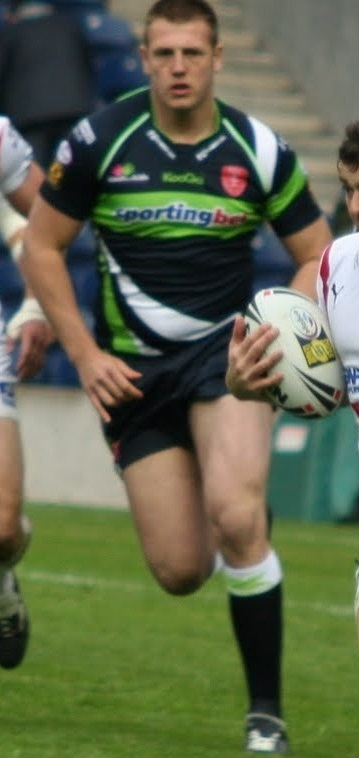
Watts playing for Hull KR in 2010

After a fine season in 2010 in which Watts played 26 of 27 Super League matches, he was called up to the England training squad for the Four Nations Championship in September 2010, and awarded the 2010 Albert Goldthorpe Rookie of the Year Medal.

==== Gateshead Thunder (loan) ====
In 2009 he spent time on loan from Hull KR at Gateshead Thunder in League 1.

=== Hull FC ===
Watts requested to be released from his contract with Hull Kingston Rovers in June 2012, and joined Hull F.C. on a three-and-a-half-year contract. Hull coach Peter Gentle said: "Liam is certainly a promising player for the future and we are looking forward to helping him realise his potential". He signed a new three-year contract in July 2014, and a further two-year contract in March 2017.

He won the Challenge Cup with Hull in 2016 and 2017 at Wembley Stadium.

==== Doncaster (loan) ====
He spent time on loan from Hull, playing for Doncaster in 2014.

=== Castleford Tigers ===
Watts signed for Castleford Tigers on a three-year deal in March 2018. Hull had agreed a fee with Championship side Toronto Wolfpack, but Castleford's "last-minute significant offer" saw him return to Wheldon Road. He made 23 appearances in his first year.

Watts had an outstanding personal season in 2019, playing in all but 2 of Castleford's games and earning a place in the Super League Dream Team. At the club's end of season awards, he was named Player of the Year and Players' Player of the Year, and won the inaugural Immortals Award voted for by Castleford legends. He was also named as the Castleford Tigers Supporters Club player of the year.

In July 2019, he signed a three-year extension until the end of the 2023 season.

On 17 July 2021, he played for Castleford in their 2021 Challenge Cup final loss against St Helens.

Watts played 20 games for Castleford in the 2023 season as the club finished 11th on the table and narrowly avoided relegation.

In the opening match of the 2024 season, Watts was controversially sent off for a high tackle on Wigan's Tyler Dupree, under new laws introduced to Super League.

On 27 February 2025, Castleford announced that Watts had left the club by mutual agreement.

=== Hull FC ===
On 3 March 2025 it was reported that he had re-joined Hull FC

On 23 September 2025 it was announced that he had left Hull FC

=== Goole Vikings ===
On 5 January 2026 it was reported that he had signed for Goole Vikings in the RFL Championship

== International career ==
=== England Knights ===
Watts played for the England Knights in 2011.

=== England ===
Good performances for Castleford saw Watts called up for the England Performance squad in March 2019.

=== England 9s ===
He was selected in England 9s squad for the 2019 Rugby League World Cup 9s.

== Club statistics ==
Appearances and points in all competitions by year
Club	Season	Tier	App	T	G	DG	Pts
Castleford Tigers	2007	Super League	1	1	0	0	4
Castleford Tigers	2018	Super League	23	0	0	0	0
Castleford Tigers	2019	Super League	30	4	0	0	16
Castleford Tigers	2020	Super League	13	1	0	0	4
Castleford Tigers	2021	Super League	18	2	0	0	8
Castleford Tigers	2022	Super League	20	2	0	0	8
Castleford Tigers	2023	Super League	20	0	0	0	0
Castleford Tigers	2024	Super League	22	0	0	0	0
Castleford Tigers	2025	Super League	1	0	0	0	0
Castleford Tigers	Total		148	10	0	0	40
Hull Kingston Rovers	2008	Super League	5	1	0	0	4
Hull Kingston Rovers	2009	Super League	1	0	0	0	0
Hull Kingston Rovers	2010	Super League	27	3	0	0	12
Hull Kingston Rovers	2011	Super League	20	2	0	0	8
Hull Kingston Rovers	2012	Super League	10	1	0	0	4
Hull Kingston Rovers	Total		63	7	0	0	28
→ Gateshead Thunder (loan)	2009	Championship	12	1	0	0	4
Hull FC	2012	Super League	12	1	0	0	4
Hull FC	2013	Super League	28	0	0	0	0
Hull FC	2014	Super League	20	2	0	0	8
Hull FC	2015	Super League	30	1	0	0	4
Hull FC	2016	Super League	31	3	0	0	12
Hull FC	2017	Super League	28	4	0	0	16
Hull FC	2018	Super League	3	0	0	0	0
Hull FC	2025	Super League	8	0	0	0	0
Hull FC	Total		152	11	0	0	44
→ Doncaster (loan)	2014	Championship	3	1	0	0	4
Goole Vikings	2026	Championship	0	0	0	0	0
Career total			378	30	0	0	120

As of match played 9 February 2025
