= Tom Lineham =

English rugby league footballer

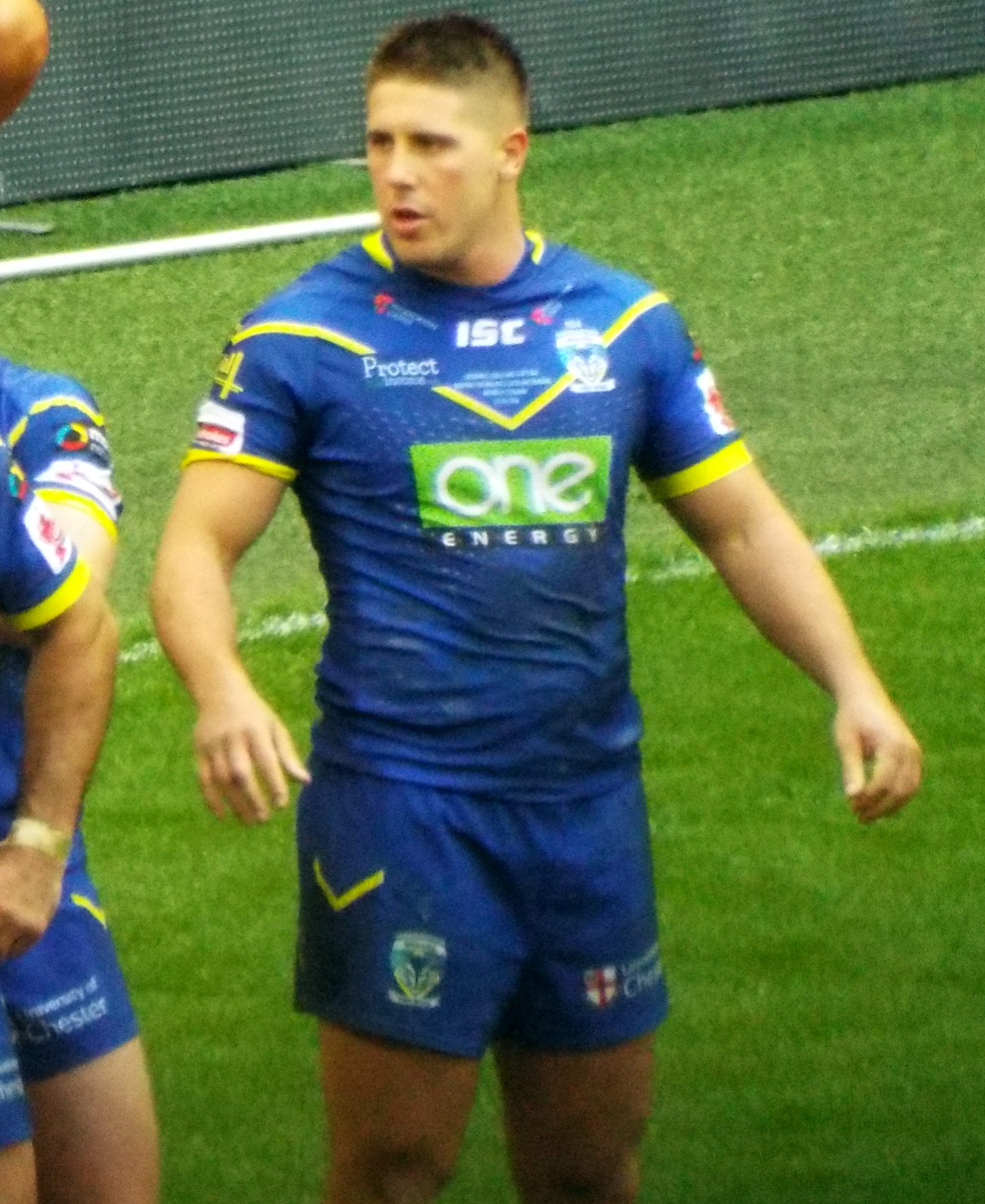

Personal information
- Full name: Thomas Keighley Lineham
- Born: 21 September 1991 (age 35) Leeds, West Yorkshire, England
- Height: 6 ft 3 in (1.90 m)
- Weight: 16 st 7 lb (105 kg)

Playing information
- Position: Wing, Centre, Second-row
Club
Years	Team	Pld	T	G	FG	P
2009–10	York City Knights	20	11	0	0	44
2011–15	Hull F.C.	68	54	0	0	216
2013(loan)	→ York City Knights	2	4	0	0	16
2016–21	Warrington Wolves	133	83	0	0	332
2016(loan)	→ Rochdale Hornets	3	2	0	0	8
2022–23	Wakefield Trinity	20	3	0	0	12
2022(loan)	→ Featherstone Rovers	10	4	0	0	16
2024	York Knights	14	7	0	0	28
2025–	Goole Vikings	0	0	0	0	0
	Total	270	168	0	0	672
Representative
Years	Team	Pld	T	G	FG	P
2018–19	England Knights	3	4	0	0	16
- Source: As of 1 August 2025

Tom Lineham (born 21 September 1991), is an English former professional rugby league footballer who plays as a winger for Goole Vikings in the RFL League 1.

He has previously played for the York City Knights in Championship 1, and Hull F.C. in the Super League. He has spent time on loan from Warrington at the Rochdale Hornets in League 1.

== Background ==
Lineham was born in Leeds, West Yorkshire, England. He grew up in South Milford and attended Sherburn High School and York College.

== Career ==
=== York RUFC ===
Lineham's position as a junior with York RUFC was in the back row, he was equally adapt at number 8 or openside-flanker, but has played as an inside-centre for York RUFC, and more recently as a wing when he converted to rugby league.

Lineham joined York RUFC under 15s in September 2006 as a raw young talent with good speed and strength. He quickly became a regular in the York team, going on to represent North Yorkshire that same season. Lineham's second season with York was an even better one than his first, he was York's top tryscorer at the end of the season, which led to a Yorkshire call up at blindside-flanker part way through the 2007–2008 season.

Lineham then went to York College in 2009 to study for his A-Levels, this is when he first started playing rugby league for the college's Rugby Development Centre, originally coached by the late Paul Higgins. Lineham scored 15 tries in 7 appearances, earning a trial with the Knights. Lineham played two trial games with the Knights reserve grade and subsequently was offered an 18-month contract with the Knights in 2009. Lineham has signed a further 1-year contract at the Knights for the season 2011 season where the Knights will be playing in the championship after last seasons promotion. Hull F.C. were believed to have approached Lineham with an offer but no contract was agreed due to Linehamneeding anterior cruciate ligament (ACL) knee reconstruction leaving in him sidelined for 7 months.

Linehams first try for the Knights first team came on 2 April 2010 against Gateshead Thunder at Huntington Stadium when he ran the ball in from 50-metres.

=== Hull FC ===
Lineham signed for Hull F.C. in 2011. After a number of good performances in the academy, Lineham made his first team début as a late substitute in the 32-18 derby win at Craven Park. His performance was rewarded with a starting spot in the next game at home to Salford, where he scored two tries whilst making a notable contribution to another, in a Man of the match performance.

His breakthrough season was in 2013 in which he was named the Hull FC's Young Player of the Year and the Super League Albert Goldthorpe Rookie of the Year.

Lineham has previously played for the York City Knights. He has also played rugby union for York RUFC. Lineham represented Yorkshire in Rugby Union. In 2013 Lineham was awarded the Albert Goldthorpe Rookie of the Year Medal.

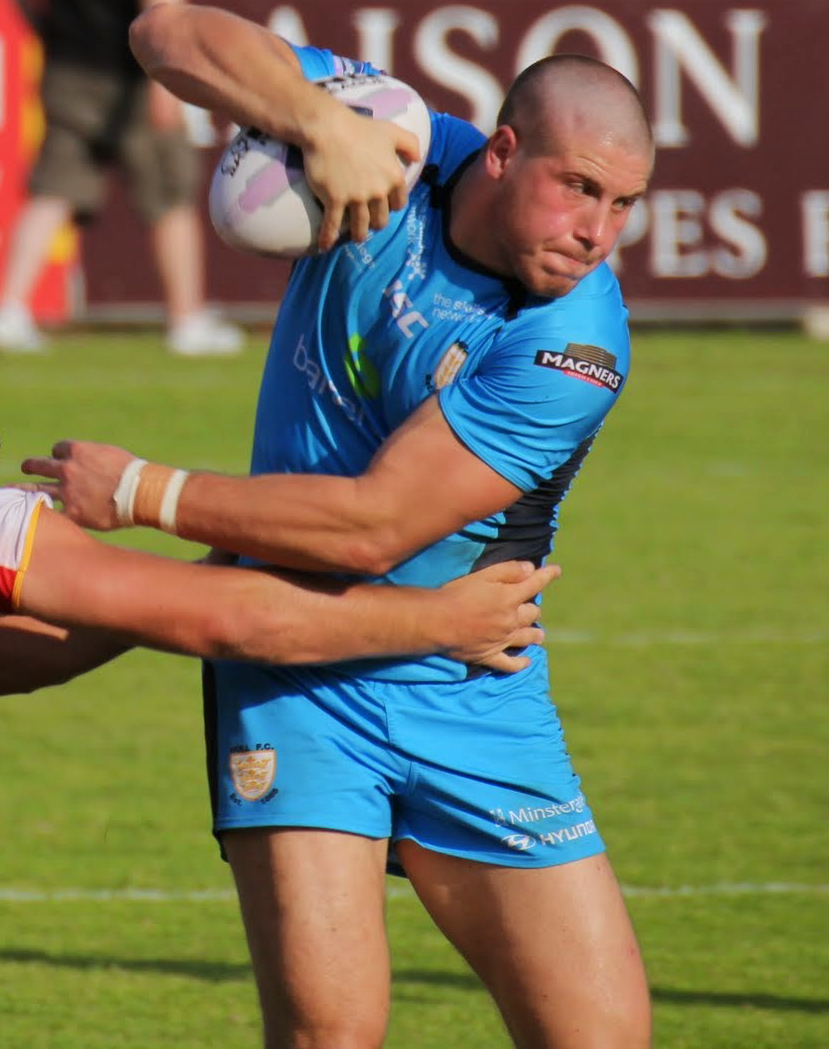
Lineham playing for Hull FC in 2014

Lineham enjoyed another outstanding season for Hull in 2015, scoring 26 tries.

=== Warrington Wolves ===
In 2016, he moved to play for Warrington, where he had a turbulent start and although continued his formidable try scoring record he was dropped from the team and Super League. He returned for the league leaders decider against his former Team Hull F.C. scoring a brace in a solid individual performance. It is believed that Lineham had ambitions of playing for Castleford.

He played in the 2016 Super League Grand Final defeat by Wigan at Old Trafford.

In the last year Lineham's weight gain and consequent loss of speed has earned him the comical if not somewhat cruel nickname, "the flying pig". A nickname which he apparently endorses. He played in the 2018 Challenge Cup Final defeat by the Catalans Dragons at Wembley Stadium. He played in the 2018 Super League Grand Final defeat by Wigan at Old Trafford.

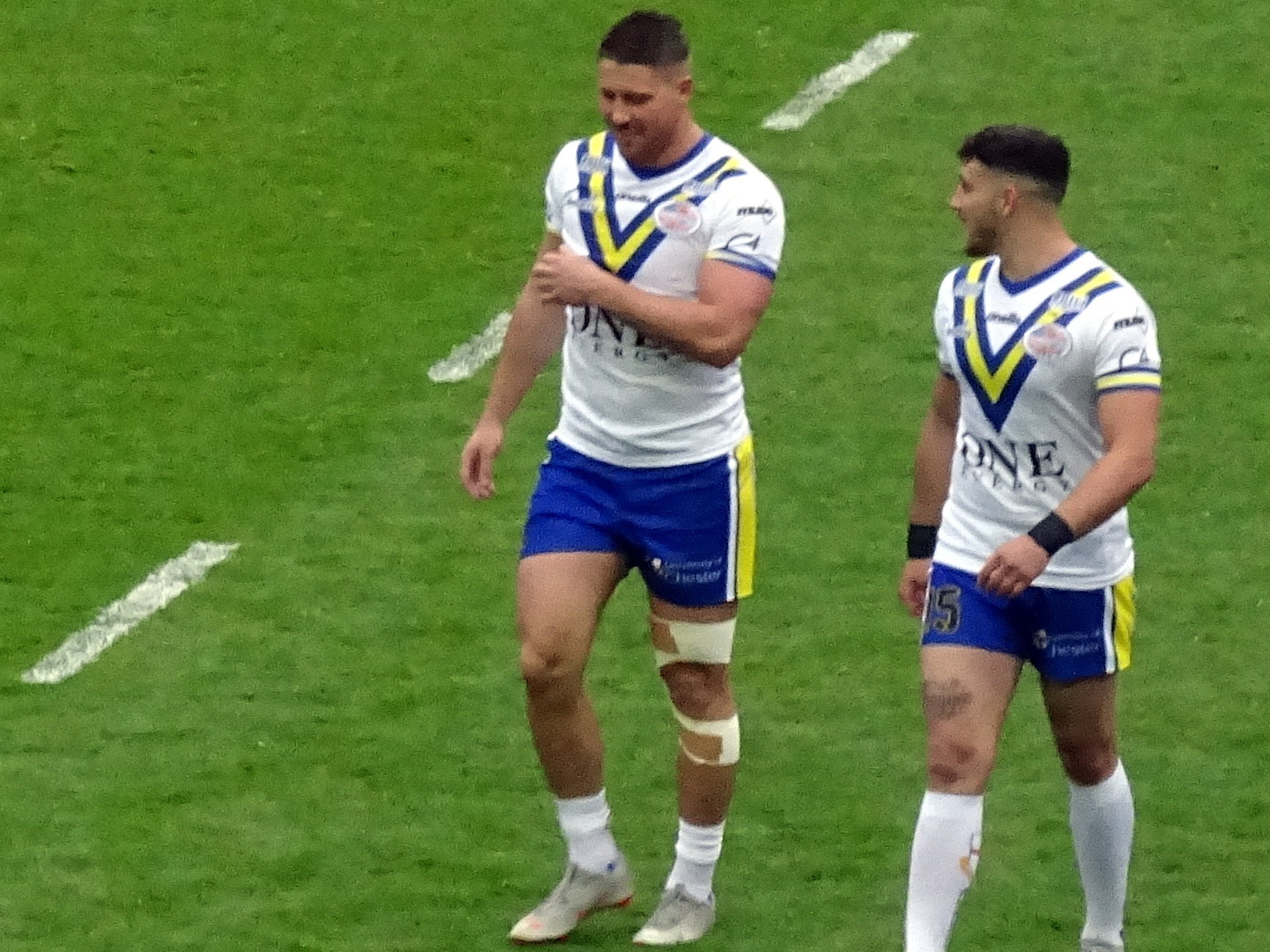
Lineham (centre) playing for the Warrington Wolves at Anfield in 2019

He played in the 2019 Challenge Cup Final victory over St. Helens at Wembley Stadium.

On 14 September 2020, Lineham was charged by the RFL and was given a Grade F "other contrary behaviour", (the most serious grade on the disciplinary panel, which carries a minimum of 8 games suspension.) for an alleged "squirrel grip" on Castleford's Alex Foster. He appeared before a disciplinary hearing on 15 September 2020, to find out the length of his suspension. Lineham contested the decision of his grade, but the tribunal dismissed his decision and he was found guilty of a Grade F and was suspended for 8 games, and fined £500. Depending on Warrington's progression in the Challenge Cup, he would have potentially missed the remainder of the season.

=== Wakefield Trinity ===
On 17 August 2021, it was reported that he had signed for Wakefield Trinity in the Super League. Lineham played 12 matches for Wakefield Trinity in the Super League XXVIII season as the club finished bottom of the table and were relegated to the RFL Championship which ended their 24-year stay in the top flight.

=== York Knights (re-join) ===
On 13 Mar 2024 it was reported that he had signed for York Knights in the RFL Championship on a 1-year deal.

=== Goole Vikings ===
On 24 July 2025 it was reported that he had signed for Goole Vikings in the RFL League 1

== International career ==
In 2018 he was selected for the England Knights on their tour of Papua New Guinea. He played against Papua New Guinea at the Lae Football Stadium. Lineham also played against PNG at the Oil Search National Football Stadium.

In 2019 he was selected for the England Knights against Jamaica at Headingley Rugby Stadium.

== Hull F.C. ==
Season	Appearance	Tries	Goals	F/G	Points
2012 Hull FC season	5	4	-	-	16
2013 Hull FC season	25	17	-	-	68
2014 Hull FC season	14	7	-	-	28
2015 Hull FC season	24	26	-	-	104
2016 Warrington Wolves	10	10	-	-	40
Total	78	64	-	-	256
