= Dean Hadley =

English professional rugby league footballer

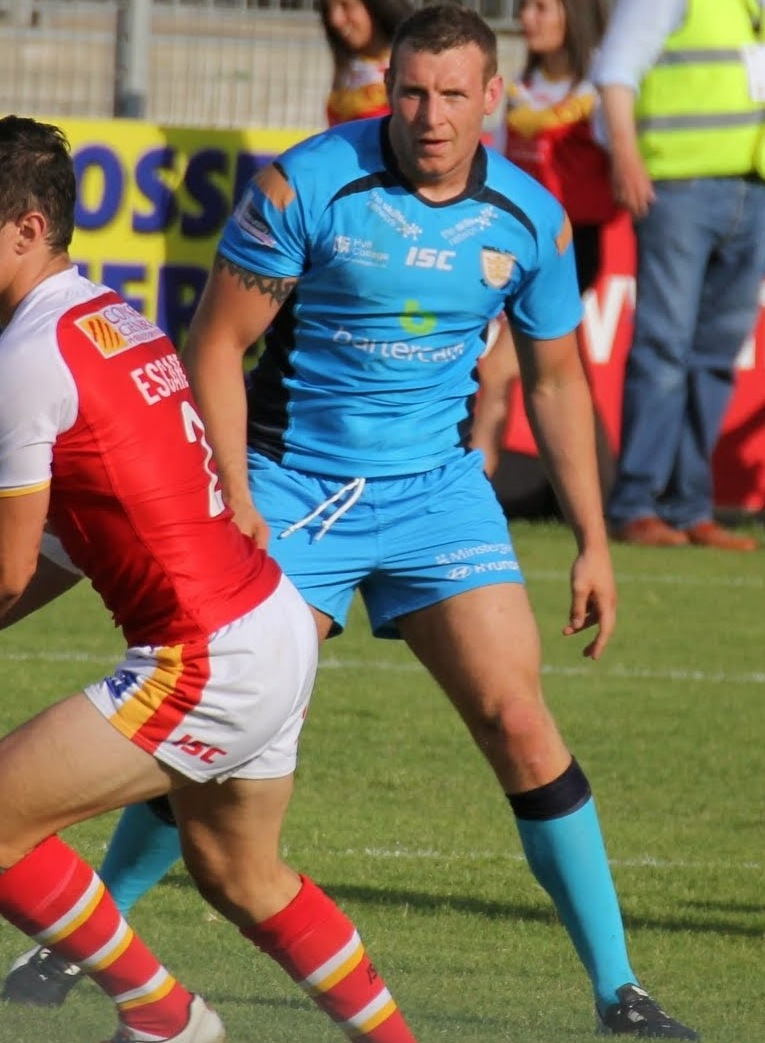

Personal information
- Born: 5 August 1992 (age 34) Hull, East Yorkshire, England
- Height: 6 ft 0 in (1.84 m)
- Weight: 15 st 8 lb (99 kg)

Playing information
- Position: Second-row, Loose forward, Prop, Hooker
Club
Years	Team	Pld	T	G	FG	P
2013–19	Hull FC	88	10	0	0	40
2013(DR)	→ York City Knights	10	4	0	0	16
2014(DR)	→ Doncaster	4	1	0	0	4
2015(DR)	→ Doncaster	1	0	0	0	0
2017(loan)	→ Wakefield Trinity	22	2	0	0	8
2019(loan)	→ Doncaster	1	0	0	0	0
2019–	Hull Kingston Rovers	163	14	0	0	48
	Total	289	31	0	0	116
Representative
Years	Team	Pld	T	G	FG	P
2018–	England Knights	1	0	0	0	0
- Source: As of 19 September 2026

Dean Hadley (born 5 August 1992) is an English professional rugby league footballer who plays as a second-row, loose forward, prop and hooker for Hull Kingston Rovers in the Super League and the England Knights at international level.

He has played for Hull F.C. in the Super League, and spent time on loan from Hull at the York City Knights in the Championship, Doncaster in League 1, and Wakefield Trinity and Hull Kingston Rovers in the Super League.

== Background ==
Hadley was born in Kingston upon Hull, East Yorkshire, England.

== Career ==
Hadley began his career with Hull F.C., coming through their academy and signing his first professional contract before the start of the 2013. He plays as a second-row.

He was loaned to York City Knights, and made 10 appearances for the club, scoring 4 tries. He also played twice in the Super League in April for Hull F.C. due to injuries occurring in the first team.

For the 2014 season, he was loaned to Doncaster. He played just 3 games before being recalled to play in the first team for Hull FC. Since then, he has made 8 appearances for the club and could be finally cementing his place in the starting 13. Dean has scored 2 tries for the club, one of them against the Huddersfield Giants in a 30-6 victory.

On 29 July 2019, Hadley joined rivals Hull Kingston Rovers from Hull F.C. on a three-year deal, teammate Jez Litten also joined the red and whites on a three-year deal. On 12 August 2023, Hadley played for Hull Kingston Rovers in their 17-16 golden point extra-time loss to Leigh in the Challenge Cup final. Hadley played a total of 23 games for Hull Kingston Rovers in the 2023 Super League season as the club finished fourth on the table and qualified for the playoffs. He played in the clubs semi-final loss against Wigan. On 12 October 2024, Hadley played in Hull Kingston Rovers 2024 Super League Grand Final loss against Wigan. On 7 June 2025, Hadley played in Hull Kingston Rovers 8-6 Challenge Cup final victory over Warrington. It was the clubs first major trophy in 40 years. On 18 September 2025, Hadley played in Hull Kingston Rovers final game of the regular season seeing the club win the League Leaders Shield in victory over Warrington On 9 October 2025, Hadley played in Hull Kingston Rovers 2025 Super League Grand Final victory over Wigan. On 19 February 2026, Hadley played in Hull Kingston Rovers World Club Challenge victory against Brisbane.

== International career ==
In July 2018 he was selected in the England Knights Performance squad. Later that year he was selected for the England Knights on their tour of Papua New Guinea. He played against Papua New Guinea at the Lae Football Stadium.
