= 2018 Hull FC season =

- Super League XXIII Rank: 8th
- Challenge Cup: Quarter-final
- 2018 record: Wins: 12; draws: 0; losses: 20
- Points scored: For: 615; against: 787

Team information
- Chairman: Adam Pearson
- Head Coach: Lee Radford
- Captain: Danny Houghton
- Stadium: KCOM Stadium; Hull, East Yorkshire
- Avg. attendance: 12,174
- High attendance: 17,564
- Low attendance: 10,051
← 2017	List of seasons	2019 →

This article details the Hull F.C. Rugby League Football Club's 2018 season.

== Results ==
=== Super League ===
==== League table ====
Pos	Team	Pld	W	D	L	PF	PA	PD	Pts	Qualification
1	St. Helens	23	21	0	2	713	298	+415	42	Super League Super 8s
2	Wigan Warriors	23	16	0	7	573	345	+228	32	Super League Super 8s
3	Castleford Tigers	23	15	1	7	567	480	+87	31	Super League Super 8s
4	Warrington Wolves	23	14	1	8	531	410	+121	29	Super League Super 8s
5	Huddersfield Giants	23	11	1	11	427	629	−202	23	Super League Super 8s
6	Hull F.C.	23	11	0	12	534	544	−10	22	Super League Super 8s
7	Wakefield Trinity	23	10	1	12	581	506	+75	21	Super League Super 8s
8	Catalans Dragons	23	10	1	12	488	531	−43	21	Super League Super 8s
9	Leeds Rhinos	23	8	2	13	441	527	−86	18	The Qualifiers
10	Hull KR	23	8	1	14	476	582	−106	17	The Qualifiers
11	Salford Red Devils	23	7	0	16	384	597	−213	14	The Qualifiers
12	Widnes Vikings	23	3	0	20	387	653	−266	6	The Qualifiers

Source: Rugby League Project

==== Super League results ====
W Win D Draw L Loss

Super League results
Date	Round	Versus	H/A	Venue	Result	Score	Tries	Goals	Attendance	Report
1 February	1	Huddersfield	H	KCOM Stadium	W	38–12			13,704	RLP
10 February	2	Wigan Warriors	N	WIN Stadium	L	10–24			12,416	RLP
24 February	3	Castleford Tigers	A	Mend-A-Hose Jungle	L	18–28			9,365	RLP
2 March	4	Warrington Wolves	H	KCOM Stadium	W	21–12			10,051	RLP
8 Match	5	Leeds Rhinos	A	Headingley Stadium	L	16–20			11,158	RLP
16 March	6	Salford Red Devils	A	AJ Bell Stadium	L	8–24			2,902	RLP
23 March	7	Catalans Dragons	H	KCOM Stadium	W	42–16			10,347	RLP
30 March	8	Hull Kingston Rovers	A	KCOM Craven Park	W	30–22			12,090	RLP
2 April	9	Wakefield Trinity	H	KCOM Stadium	W	27–26			11,529	RLP
6 April	10	St Helens	A	Totally Wicked Stadium	L	12–26			10,408	RLP
12 April	11	Widnes Vikings	A	Halton Stadium	W	39–20			3,733	RLP
19 April	12	Leeds Rhinos	H	KCOM Stadium	W	19–18			11,391	RLP
28 April	13	Catalans Dragons	A	Stade Gilbert Brutus	L	24–25			8,823	RLP
5 May	14	Castleford Tigers	H	KCOM Stadium	W	36–12			13,623	RLP
20 May	15	Hull Kingston Rovers	N	St James' Park	W	34–22			25,438	RLP
25 May	16	Warrington Wolves	A	Halliwell Jones Stadium	L	12–30			8,846	RLP
8 June	17	Salford Red Devils	H	KCOM Stadium	W	45–14			10,606	RLP
16 June	18	Wigan Warriors	H	KCOM Stadium	L	10–14			13,256	RLP
29 June	19	Widnes Vikings	H	KCOM Stadium	W	31–24			10,420	RLP
5 July	20	Huddersfield Giants	A	John Smiths Stadium	L	18–29			4,696	RLP
13 July	21	St Helens	H	KCOM Stadium	L	18–34			11,430	RLP
22 July	22	Wakefield Trinity	A	Mobile Rocket Stadium	L	10–72			5,634	RLP
27 July	23	Hull Kingston Rovers	H	KCOM Stadium	L	16–20			17,654	RLP

=== Super 8s ===
==== Super 8s table ====
Pos	Team	Pld	W	D	L	PF	PA	PD	Pts	Qualification
1	St. Helens (L)	30	26	0	4	895	408	+487	52	Semi-finals
2	Wigan Warriors (C)	30	23	0	7	740	417	+323	46	Semi-finals
3	Castleford Tigers	30	20	1	9	767	582	+185	41	Semi-finals
4	Warrington Wolves	30	18	1	11	767	561	+206	37	Semi-finals
5	Wakefield Trinity	30	13	1	16	747	696	+51	27	
6	Huddersfield Giants	30	13	1	16	539	794	−255	27	
7	Catalans Dragons	30	12	1	17	596	750	−154	25	
8	Hull F.C.	30	11	0	19	615	787	−172	22	

Source: Rugby League Project
(C) Champions; (L) League Leaders' Shield Winners

==== Super 8s results ====
Super 8s results
Date	Round	Versus	H/A	Venue	Result	Score	Tries	Goals	Attendance	Report
10 August	S1	Wakefield Trinity	H	KCOM Stadium	L	13–31			10,301	RLP
17 August	S2	Huddersfield Giants	H	KCOM Stadium	L	6–26			4,499	RLP
30 August	S3	Warrington Wolves	A	Halliwell Jones Stadium	L	10–80			8,101	RLP
7 September	S4	Castleford Tigers	H	KCOM Stadium	L	8–28			10,570	RLP
14 September	S5	St Helens	A	Totally Wicked Stadium	L	12–38			9,348	RLP
22 September	S6	Catalans Dragons	H	KCOM Stadium	L	20–26			10,467	RLP
28 September	S7	Wigan Warriors	A	DW Stadium	L	12–14			11,189	RLP

=== Challenge Cup ===
W Win L Loss

Challenge Cup results
Date	Round	Versus	H/A	Venue	Result	Score	Tries	Goals	Attendance	Report
10 May	6	Featherstone Rovers	A	LD Nutrition Stadium	W	38–20			3,222	RLP
4 June	Quarter-finals	St Helens	A	Totally Wicked Stadium	L	22–25			9,644	RLP
