= Paul Johnson (rugby league, born 1988) =

English rugby league footballer (born 1988)

Personal information
- Born: 13 March 1988 (age 38) St Helens, Merseyside, England
- Height: 6 ft 0 in (1.83 m)
- Weight: 15 st 10 lb (100 kg)

Playing information
- Position: Second-row, Centre
Club
Years	Team	Pld	T	G	FG	P
2009–10	St Helens	2	0	0	0	0
2011–12	Wakefield Trinity Wildcats	47	6	0	0	24
2013	Hull F.C.	21	0	0	0	0
2014–15	Widnes Vikings	7	0	0	0	0
2015(loan)	→ Whitehaven	0	0	0	0	0
	Total	77	6	0	0	24

Paul Johnson (born 13 March 1988) is an English professional rugby league footballer. He previously played for the Widnes Vikings in the Super League. Signing for St. Helens from amateur side Blackbrook ARLFC, Johnson plays as either a prop or second-row. He has international honours at amateur level, having featured for Great Britain Community Lions. He was named in his first 19-man squad ahead of the derby with Wigan Warriors on Friday 31 July 2009. He also made the 19 for the 21 August 2009 game against the Huddersfield Giants but again dropped out.

== Début season (2010) ==
Johnson made his first grade début for St Helens in 2010's Super League XV, coming off the bench to play second-row in a 30–22 win at home to the Huddersfield Giants.

== Move to Wakefield Trinity Wildcats ==
It was announced that Johnson's first year with Saints would be his last, as he secured a two-year contract at Wakefield Trinity Wildcats. He has been allocated the shirt number 17. Johnson made his début in the Festive Trophy on New Years Day, when Wakefield Trinity Wildcats lost 22–40 to Leeds Rhinos. He was awarded the Man of The Match Award in this game, for his excellent contribution going forward.

== Widnes Vikings ==
On 7 October 2013, it was announced that Johnson would be signing for the Widnes Vikings on a one-year contract after securing an early release from Hull FC. On 22 April 2014, Johnson extended his Widnes contract to the end of 2016. On 11 February 2015 Johnson and fellow Vikings teammate Grant Gore was loaned to Whitehaven on a one-month deal.
