= Chris Green (rugby league) =

English professional rugby league footballer

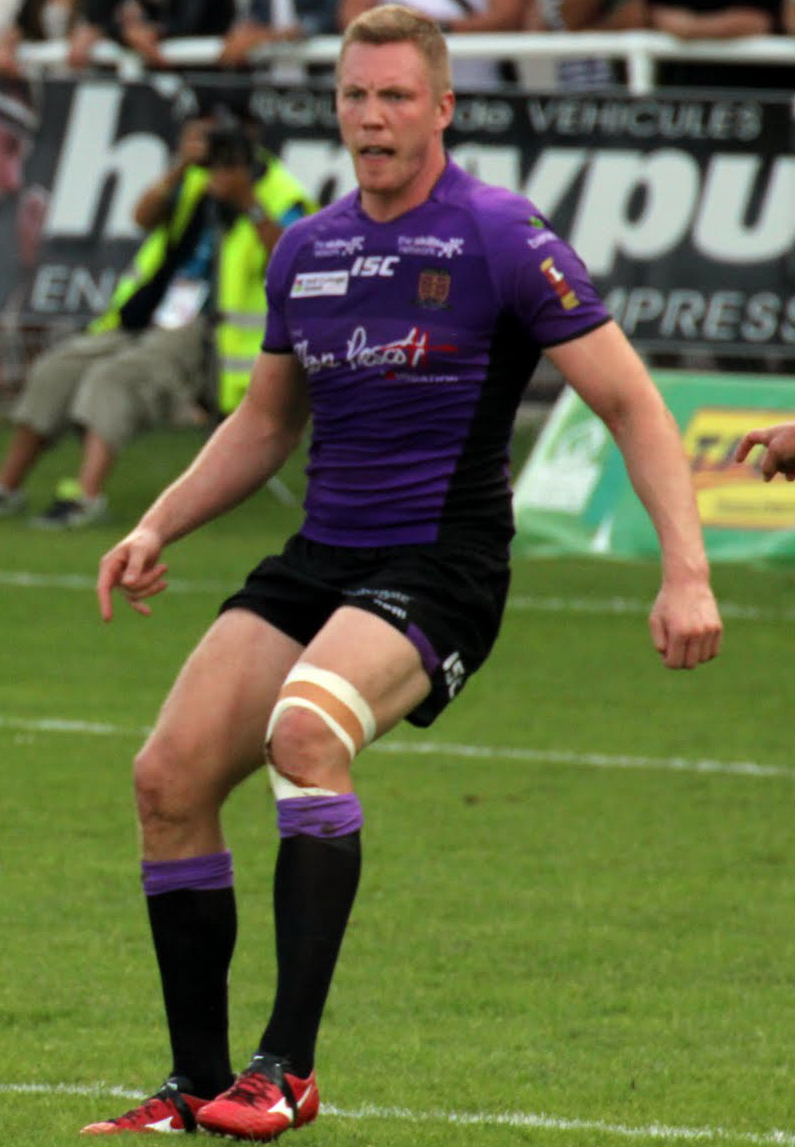

Personal information
- Full name: Christopher Green
- Born: 3 January 1990 (age 35); Hull, East Yorkshire, England
- Height: 6 ft 5 in (1.96 m)
- Weight: 16 st 7 lb (105 kg)

Playing information
- Position: Prop, Loose forward
Club
Years	Team	Pld	T	G	FG	P
2011–19	Hull F.C.	146	9	0	0	36
2011(loan)	→ Doncaster	5	7	0	0	28
2012(loan)	→ York City Knights	7	5	0	0	20
2014(loan)	→ Doncaster	4	0	0	0	0
2014(loan)	→ Featherstone Rovers	5	0	0	0	0
2019(loan)	→ Wakefield Trinity	4	0	0	0	0
2020–21	Wakefield Trinity	29	1	0	0	4
2022	Leigh Centurions	2	0	0	0	0
	Total	202	22	0	0	88
- Source: As of 21 December 2022

Christopher Green (born 3 January 1990) is an English former professional rugby league footballer who last played as a prop for the Leigh Centurions in the Championship.

He played for Hull F.C. in the Super League and spent time on loan at from Hull at Doncaster in Championship 1 and the Championship, and the York City Knights and Featherstone Rovers in the Championship. Green has also spent time on loan from Hull at Wakefield in the 2019 Super League.

== Background ==
Green was born in Kingston upon Hull, Humberside, England.

== Career ==
=== Hull FC ===
He has played for Hull F.C. in the Super League, Doncaster (two loan spells), the York City Knights (loan), and Featherstone Rovers (loan), as a prop.

He is well known by fans after his 79th minute try against local rivals Hull Kingston Rovers at the Magic Weekend in 2013, in which Hull F.C. went on to win the game 22–16.

He played in the 2016 Challenge Cup Final victory over the Warrington Wolves at Wembley Stadium.

He played in the 2017 Challenge Cup Final victory over the Wigan Warriors at Wembley Stadium.

=== Leigh Centurions ===
On 15 Oct 2021 it was reported that he had signed for Leigh Centurions in the RFL Championship
