= Mark O'Meley =

Australia international rugby league footballer

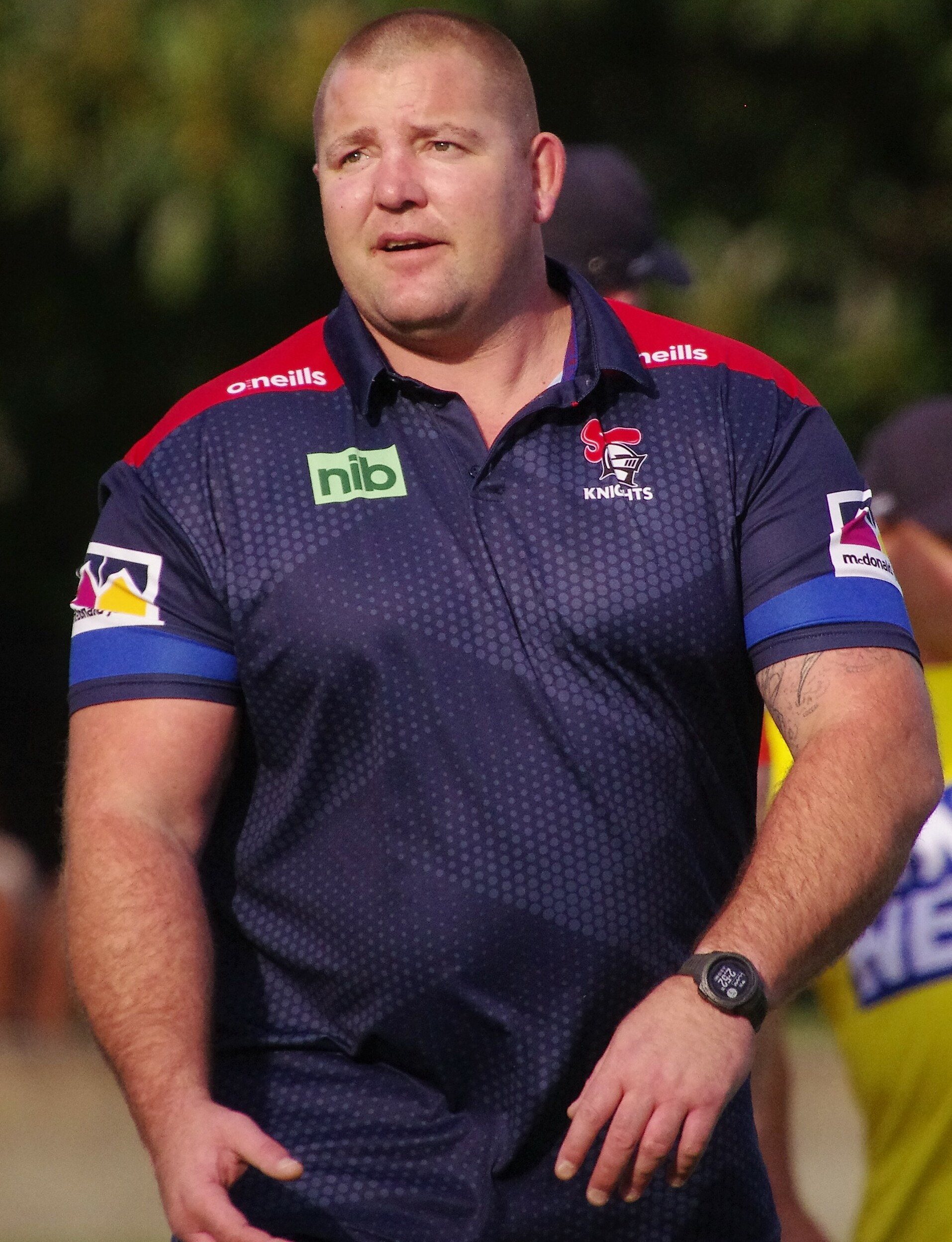

Personal information
- Born: 22 May 1981 (age 45) West Wyalong, New South Wales, Australia

Playing information
- Height: 180 cm (5 ft 11 in)
- Weight: 106 kg (16 st 10 lb)
- Position: Prop
Club
Years	Team	Pld	T	G	FG	P
1999	North Sydney Bears	22	0	0	0	0
2000–01	Northern Eagles	34	0	0	0	0
2002–07	Canterbury Bulldogs	110	16	0	0	64
2008–09	Sydney Roosters	35	2	0	0	8
2010–13	Hull F.C.	90	13	0	0	52
	Total	291	31	0	0	124
Representative
Years	Team	Pld	T	G	FG	P
2002–09	NSW City	5	0	0	0	0
2001–06	New South Wales	10	0	0	0	0
2004–06	Australia	15	3	0	0	12
2011	Exiles	1	0	0	0	0

Mark O'Meley (born 22 May 1981) is an Australian former professional rugby league footballer of Irish descent who played as a prop in the 1990s, 2000s and 2010s he also played junior rugby league for the Northern Lakes Warriors and the Wyong Roos. He also went on to coach the Wyong Roos.

An Australian international and New South Wales State of Origin representative forward, he previously played in the National Rugby League for the North Sydney Bears, the Northern Eagles, the Canterbury-Bankstown Bulldogs (with whom he won the 2004 NRL premiership) and the Sydney Roosters. O'Meley also played for Hull F.C. in the Super League

== Background ==
O'Meley was born in West Wyalong, New South Wales, Australia. O'Meley played with the Northern Lakes Warriors (previously Munmorah Maulers) on the New South Wales' Central Coast.

== Playing career ==
O'Meley made his first grade debut for North Sydney in round 1 1999 against Western Suburbs at Parramatta Stadium. At the end of the 1999 NRL season, North Sydney had a joint venture with arch rivals the Manly-Warringah Sea Eagles to form the Northern Eagles as part of the NRL's rationalisation plan.

O'Meley played for the Northern Eagles in their inaugural game against the Newcastle Knights in round 1 of the 2000 NRL season at the Central Coast Stadium. O'Meley departed the club at the end of the 2001 season and signed for Canterbury.

O'Meley, nicknamed the Ogre or "Shrek" for his shaved head and burly figure, was first selected to represent New South Wales as a front-rower for game II of the 2001 State of Origin series. He has also represented in the 2002, 2004 and 2006 Origin series.

O'Meley played for Canterbury at prop forward in their 2004 NRL grand final victory over cross-town rivals, the Sydney Roosters.

O'Meley was selected in the Australian team to go and compete in the end of season 2004 Rugby League Tri-Nations tournament. In his first game, he scored one try. In the final against Great Britain he played from the interchange bench in the Kangaroos' 44–4 victory.

O'Meley participated in the 2005 and 2006 Tri-Nation series as well as Tests against France and New Zealand.

In May 2007, O'Meley announced that he had signed a four-year contract for the Sydney Roosters.

In his first season at the Roosters in 2008, the side reached the semi-final stage but were eliminated by the New Zealand Warriors.

While originally not selected, he was selected for City in the City vs Country match on 8 May 2009, due to injury to another player.

He announced that he would be leaving the Sydney Roosters at the end of the 2009 NRL season to play in the Super League with English club Hull F.C. along with Roosters teammates Craig Fitzgibbon and Jordan Tansey.

In his final year at the Sydney Roosters, the club finished last on the table and claimed the wooden spoon.

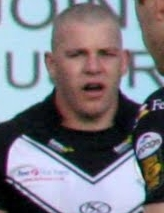
O'Meley playing for Hull FC in 2010

O'Meley was selected for the Exiles squad for the International Origin match against England at Headingley on 10 June 2011.

O'Meley agreed a one-year extension of his contract with Hull F.C. in September 2012, making him eligible to play for the 2013 Super League season.

O'Meley signed a two-year deal with the Wyong Roos in 2014.

O'Meley retired at the end of 2014 but came out of retirement the following year to play a one-off match with his son for Wyong in the local first grade competition.

At the time of his retirement, O'Meley was the last active former player of the North Sydney Bears.

== Post-playing career ==
O'Meley coached the Canterbury Bulldogs' Harold Matthews Cup side in 2025. His son, Nick, was recruited by Phil Gould for the Bulldogs for the 2026 season.
