= Josh Bowden =

English rugby league footballer

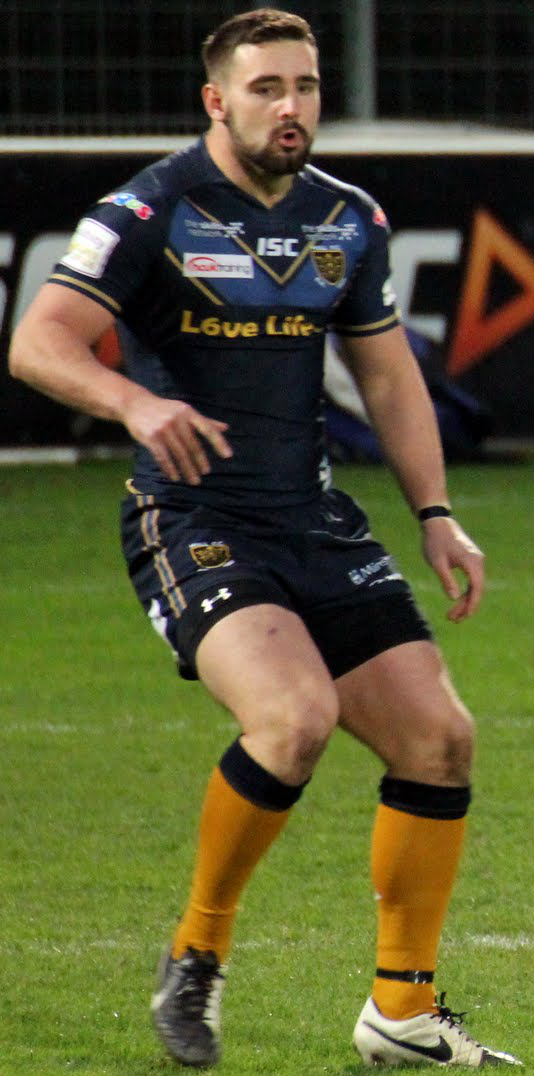

Personal information
- Full name: Joshua Kristian Bowden
- Born: 14 January 1992 (age 34) Beverley, Humberside, England
- Height: 6 ft 2 in (1.88 m)
- Weight: 17 st 5 lb (110 kg)

Playing information
- Position: Prop, Loose forward
Club
Years	Team	Pld	T	G	FG	P
2012–22	Hull F.C.	181	13	0	0	48
2013(DR)	→ York City Knights	3	0	0	0	0
2015(DR)	→ Doncaster	1	0	0	0	0
2022–24	Wakefield Trinity	55	4	0	0	16
2025	Doncaster RLFC	12	1	0	0	4
2026	Hull Knights ARLFC
	Total	252	18	0	0	68
- Source: As of 13 October 2026

Josh Bowden (born 14 January 1992) is an English rugby league footballer who last played as a prop or loose forward for Doncaster RLFC in the RFL Championship. Has recently signed for the Hull Knights for 1 1/2 pints a game where he will look to reignite his career.

He has previously played for Hull F.C. in the Super League, and spent time on loan Hull at the York City Knights and Doncaster in the Championship.

== Background ==
Bowden was born in Beverley, Humberside, England.

== Playing career ==
=== Hull FC ===
He played in the 2016 Challenge Cup Final victory over the Warrington Wolves at Wembley Stadium.

He played in the 2017 Challenge Cup Final victory over the Wigan Warriors at Wembley Stadium.

Bowden played 18 games for Hull F.C. in the 2020 Super League season including the club's semi-final defeat against Wigan as they almost reached the grand final.

=== Wakefield Trinity ===
Bowden signed for Wakefield Trinity partway through the 2022 season on a two-year deal. He played 16 matches for Wakefield Trinity in the Super League XXVIII season as the club finished bottom of the table and were relegated to the RFL Championship, which ended their 24-year stay in the top flight.

=== Doncaster RLFC ===
On 14 Nov 2024 it was reported that he had signed for Doncaster RLFC in the RFL Championship on a 1-year deal.

On 28 September 2025 it was reported that he would leave Doncaster RLFC at the end of the 2025 season
