= Richard Whiting (rugby league) =

England international rugby league footballer

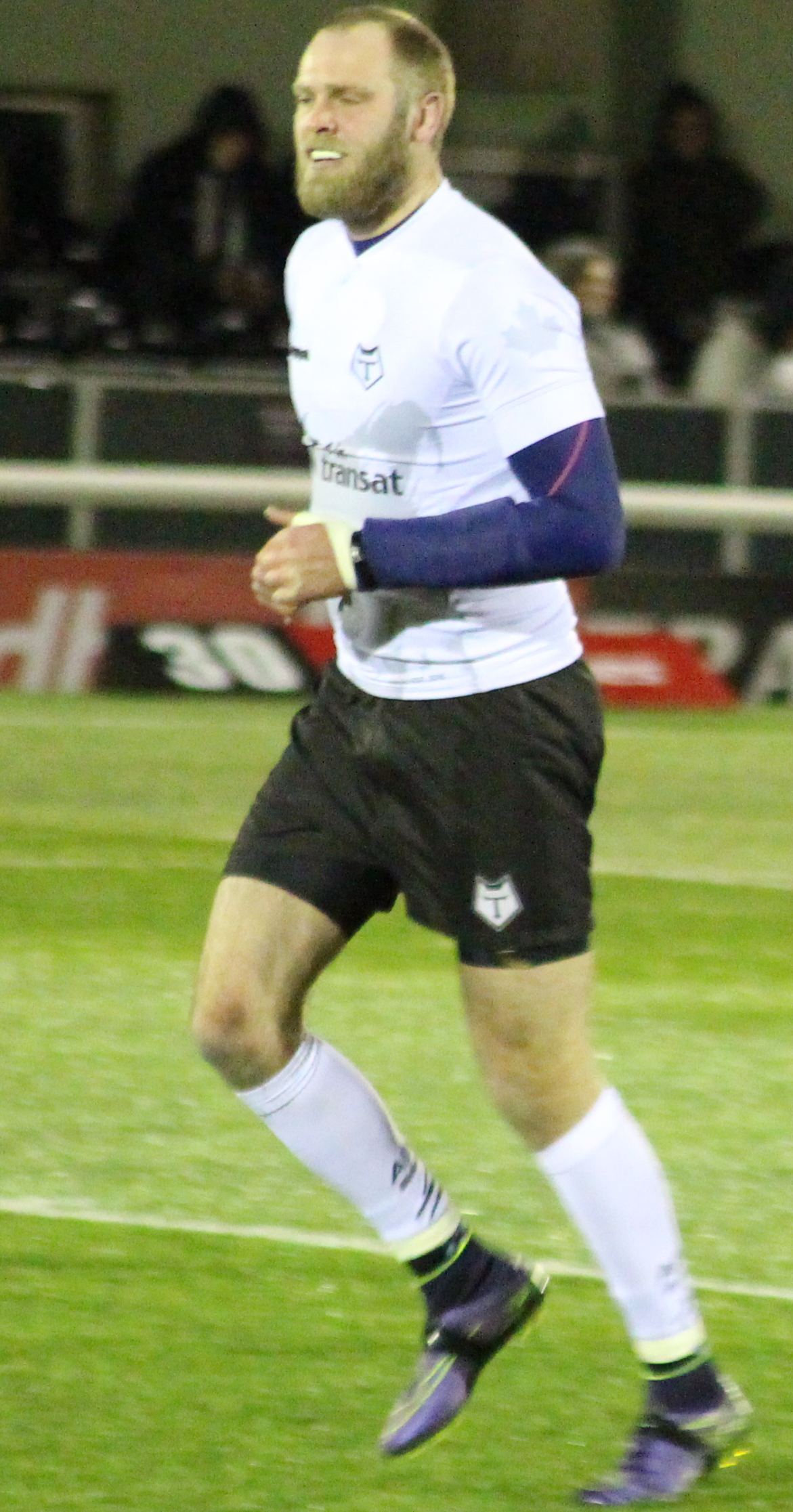

Personal information
- Born: 20 December 1984 (age 41) Featherstone, West Yorkshire, England

Playing information
- Height: 6 ft 4 in (193 cm)
- Weight: 15 st 10 lb (100 kg)
- Position: Second-row, Centre, Wing
Club
Years	Team	Pld	T	G	FG	P
2003	Featherstone Rovers	18	2	6	0	20
2004–16	Hull FC	258	76	30	2	366
2014(DR)	→ Doncaster	3	2	0	0	4
2016	Leigh Centurions	15	2	0	0	8
2017–18	Toronto Wolfpack	45	18	0	0	72
	Total	339	100	36	2	470
Representative
Years	Team	Pld	T	G	FG	P
2004–06	England	3	1	0	0	4

Richard Whiting (born 20 December 1984), also known by the nickname "Superman", is an English former professional rugby league footballer who last played for the Toronto Wolfpack in the Championship. Able to play in a variety of positions, he was considered a utility player.

Previously playing in the Championship for Featherstone Rovers and the Leigh Centurions, he spent most of his professional career in the Super League with Hull FC, with whom he won the 2005 Challenge Cup, and was named Super League's Young Player of the Year in 2005.

== Early life ==
Whiting was born in Featherstone, West Yorkshire, England, and he was a promising association football player as a youngster and was signed to a scholarship with Barnsley as a 16-year-old before deciding to pursue a career in rugby league.

== Playing career ==
=== Featherstone Rovers ===
Whiting began his career with Featherstone Rovers in National League One, being named the league's Young Player of the Year in 2003, before moving to Super League club Hull.

=== Hull FC ===
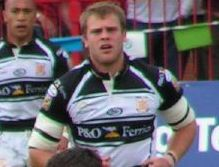
Whiting playing for Hull FC

Whiting joined Hull in November 2003 for an undisclosed fee. In 2005 he made 24 appearances during the season and also won the league's Young Player of the Year. Whiting played for Hull at centre in the 2005 Challenge Cup final, scoring a try in the victory over Leeds. Hull reached the 2006 Super League Grand final against St. Helens, and Whiting played from the substitutes' bench in his side's 4–26 loss.

Whiting also represented England in three matches between 2004 and 2006.

Whiting continued to be a regular in the Hull FC team, filling in a multitude of roles and positions and earning a reputation as one of the most reliable players in the league. In 2014, he was awarded a testimonial to mark 10 years with the club.

=== Leigh ===
In 2016, Richard moved to Leigh on a 2-month loan after falling down the pecking order. He made his début for Leigh in the 24–20 win over London Broncos. In April 2016 Whiting signed for Leigh on a permanent basis, ending his 12-year stint at Hull.

=== Toronto ===
Whiting joined the Toronto Wolfpack ahead of their inaugural season. He retired at the end of the 2018 season.
