= Ben Crooks =

English professional rugby league footballer

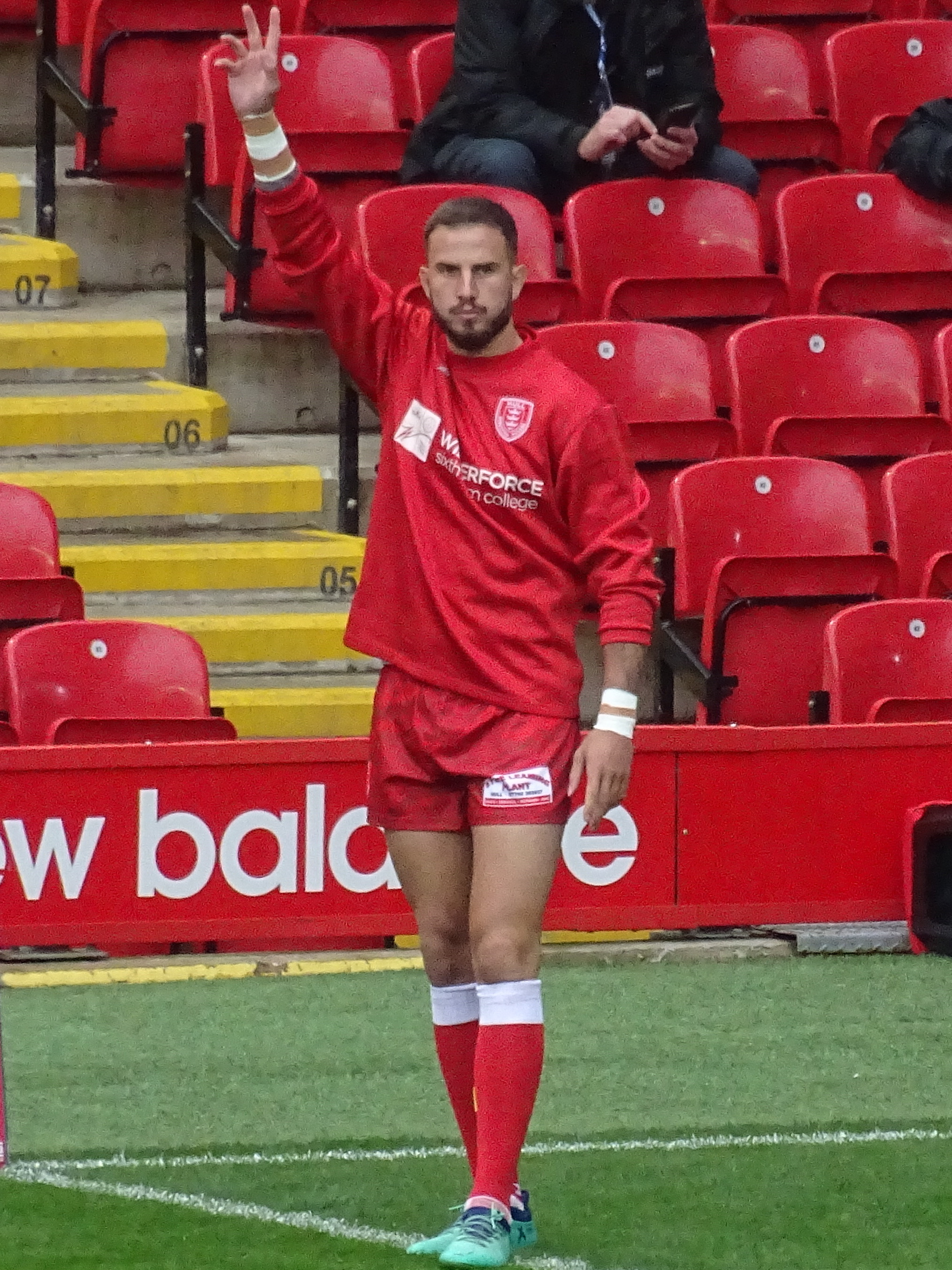

Personal information
- Full name: Benjamin Crooks
- Born: 15 June 1993 (age 33) Pontefract, West Yorkshire, England
- Height: 6 ft 3 in (1.90 m)
- Weight: 14 st 13 lb (95 kg)

Playing information
- Position: Centre, Wing
Club
Years	Team	Pld	T	G	FG	P
2012–14	Hull F.C.	51	31	30	0	184
2014(DR)	→ Doncaster	3	5	0	0	20
2015	Parramatta Eels	0	0	0	0	0
2016–17	Castleford Tigers	28	6	1	0	26
2017(loan)	→ Leigh Centurions	23	6	0	0	24
2018	Leigh Centurions	25	16	0	0	64
2018(loan)	→ Hull Kingston Rovers	6	1	0	0	4
2019–22	Hull Kingston Rovers	74	36	15	0	174
2023	Keighley Cougars	8	6	0	0	24
2023–26	Halifax Panthers	60	27	1	0	110
	Total	278	134	47	0	630
- Source: As of 13 October 2026
- Father: Lee Crooks
- Relatives: Steve Norton (uncle)

Ben Crooks (born 15 June 1993) is an English former rugby league footballer who last played as a centre or winger for the Halifax Panthers in the Betfred Championship.

Crooks has previously played for Hull Kingston Rovers and Hull F.C. in the Super League, and on loan from Hull at Doncaster R.L.F.C. in the Championship. He was contracted to Parramatta Eels in the NRL, returning to the UK to play for Castleford Tigers, and then on loan from Castleford at Leigh Centurions in the Super League.

== Background ==
Crooks was born in Pontefract, West Yorkshire, England. He is the son of Hull F.C. player, Lee Crooks and the nephew of another Hull F.C. Legend, Steve Norton.

== Playing career ==
=== Hull F.C. (2012–14) ===
Crooks is a product of the Hull F.C. Academy System. Crooks made his Hull F.C. and Super League début on 22 April 2012, in a 56–12 loss to Wigan Warriors.

He enjoyed a breakthrough season in 2013, creating a deadly try-scoring combination with winger Tom Lineham. Which led to his selection in the Super League Dream Team. At the end of the 2013 season, he was named Super League's 'Young Player of the Year.'

He also represented Hull F.C. in the 2013 Challenge Cup Final. Crooks struggled to recapture his form in 2014, making only 12 first-team appearances for Hull F.C. and spending time on loan at Doncaster.

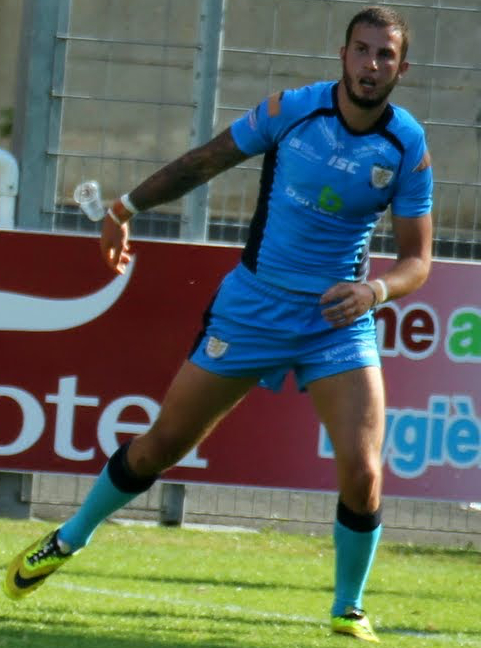
Crooks in action for Hull F.C. in 2014

=== Doncaster R.L.F.C. (2014) ===
He had a short loan-spell at Doncaster in 2014, making three appearances and scoring five tries in total.

=== Parramatta Eels (2015) ===
Crooks signed a two-year deal with National Rugby League side Parramatta, in September 2014. But he left after only a year, after his deal with Parramatta turned out to be an unsuccessful one.

As a result, Crooks mainly played for the reserve-grade New South Wales Cup team the Wentworthville Magpies.

Subsequently, following his departure from Parramatta, Crooks signed a deal to play for Castleford in the Super League, ahead of the 2016 rugby league season.

=== Castleford Tigers (2016–17) ===
Crooks returned to the Super League in 2016 and signed a three-year contract with Castleford. Although he didn't manage to play in the NRL he shared his belief saying that, "I believe I have achieved my goals in my career development and I will return to the Super League a better player for the experience."

=== Leigh Centurions (2017–18) ===
Crooks joined Leigh on loan from Castleford for the 2017 season.

The move was then made on a permanent basis with a two-year deal signed in October 2017.

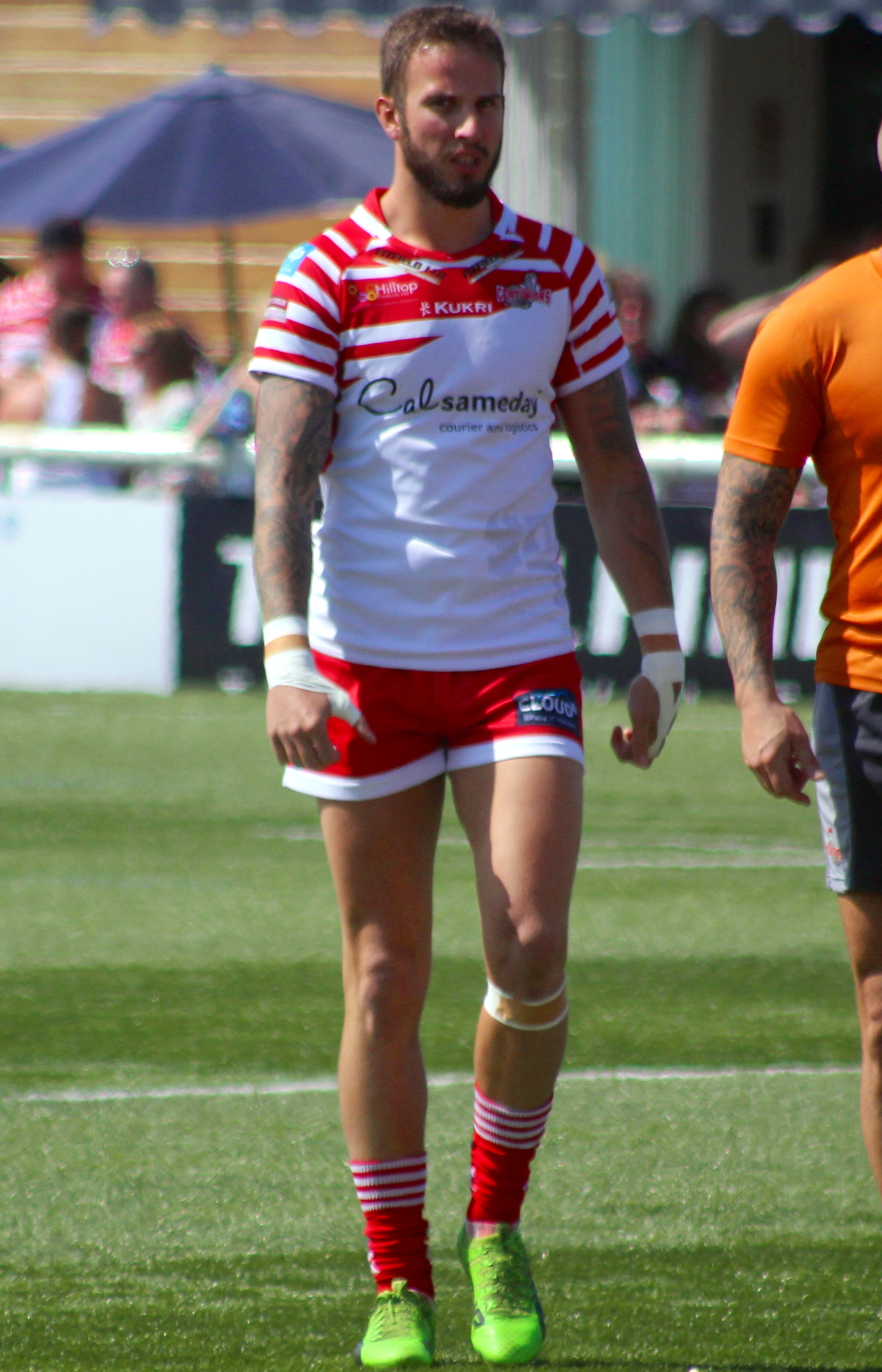
Crooks in action for the Leigh Centurions in 2018

=== Hull Kingston Rovers (2018–22) ===
It was revealed on 26 July 2018, that Crooks would be returning to the city of Hull to play for Hull Kingston Rovers for the remainder of the 2018 rugby league season, on a loan basis from Leigh.

The loan-deal which involved Crooks moving to the east Hull outfit, also saw his fellow Centurions' teammate Craig Hall come over with him in the same move.

On 27 July 2018, just a day after joining Hull Kingston Rovers. Crooks made his début for the club on a rain-swept evening against Hull F.C. at the KCOM Stadium, in the final round of the regular Super League season.

Crooks marked his return to the city of Hull, starting the game at the centre position in the 'Hull Derby.' In which Hull KR claimed a 16–20 victory over their cross-city rivals.

It was revealed on 24 October 2018, that Crooks had agreed to sign a new two-year contract, to make his loan move from Leigh to Hull Kingston Rovers on a permanent basis starting in 2019.

In round 3 of the 2021 Super League season, Crooks scored the fastest try in Super League history after scoring in the opening seven seconds of Hull Kingston Rovers 25–24 victory over Huddersfield.

In round 6 of the 2021 Super League season, he scored two tries in a 26–22 victory over Castleford. Crooks made a total of 17 appearances for Hull KR in the 2021 Super League season as the club reached the semi-final against the Catalans Dragons but were defeated 28–10. On 29 August 2022, it was announced that Crooks would be one of eleven players who were to depart Hull Kingston Rovers at the end of the 2022 season.

=== Keighley Cougars (2023–) ===
Crooks signed a two-year deal with the Keighley Cougars on 30 September 2022.

=== Halifax ===
On 16 June 2023, Crooks signed a contract to join RFL Championship side Halifax.

Retirement

Ben announced his retirement on social media on the 30th August 2026
