= Jamie Shaul =

England international rugby league & rugby union player

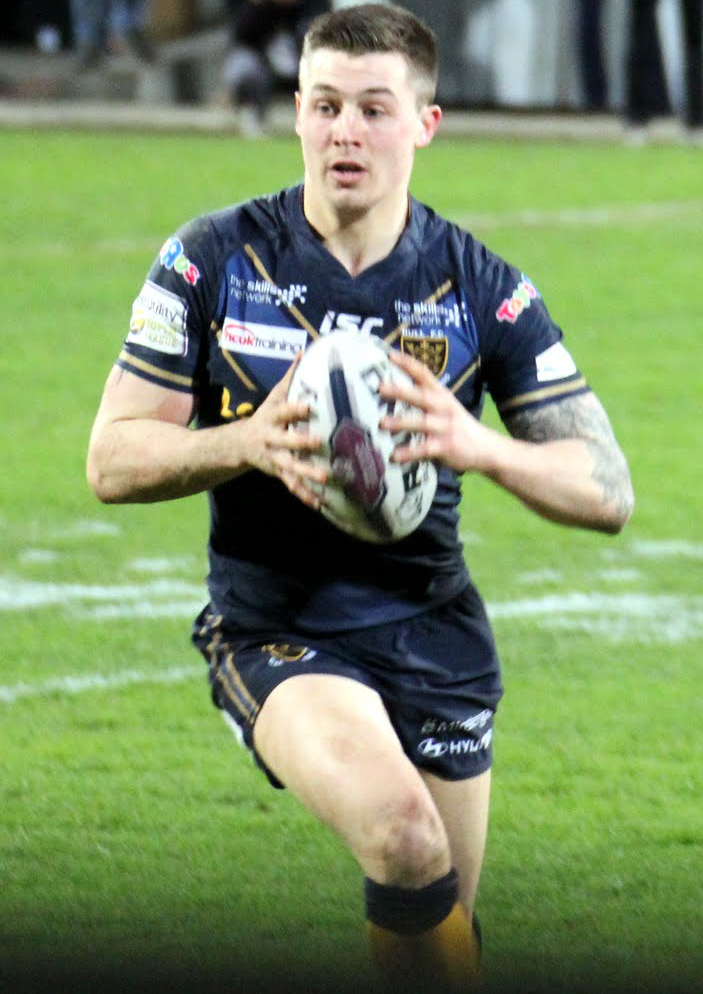

Personal information
- Full name: Jamie Edward Shaul
- Born: 1 July 1992 (age 34) Hull, Humberside, England
- Height: 5 ft 10 in (1.78 m)
- Weight: 13 st 12 lb (88 kg)

Playing information

Rugby league
- Position: Fullback, Wing
Club
Years	Team	Pld	T	G	FG	P
2013–23	Hull F.C.	200	100	1	1	403
2013(DR)	→ York City Knights	3	0	0	0	0
2022(loan)	→ Wakefield Trinity	6	1	0	0	4
2025	Goole Vikings	10	5	0	0	20
	Total	219	106	1	1	427
Representative
Years	Team	Pld	T	G	FG	P
2018	England	1	0	0	0	0
2018	England Knights	0	0	0	0	0

Rugby union
Club
Years	Team	Pld	T	G	FG	P
2023–24	Hull RUFC	13	0	0	0	0
- Source: As of 4 October 2024

Jamie Shaul (born 1 July 1992) is a former England International rugby league player who played as a fullback.

"loverugbyleague">"Jamie Shaul Player Stats". loverugbyleague.com.

Shaul spent time on loan at the York City Knights in the Kingstone Press Championship in 2013 and at Wakefield Trinity in 2022. In 2025 Shaul joined Goole Vickings ahead of there first ever Betfred League 1 professional season. He retuned to play for Hull RUFC, at the Ferens Ground in 2026.

== Background ==
Shaul was born in Kingston upon Hull, East Riding of Yorkshire, England.

== Playing career ==
=== Hull FC ===
An ex-brick layer, he was Hull's U20 player of the year in 2012 and has been ever present since August 2013. In the 2014 season, he has made 14 appearances and scored 10 tries.

After making a strong start to his Hull F.C. career in 2013, he was handed a new 5-year contract. Shaul was Hull's starting full-back in the teams Challenge Cup Final defeat by Wigan Warriors

In 2016, Shaul played an important part in Hull's successful campaign. He scored the winning try in the team's 2016 Challenge Cup Final win over the Warrington Wolves, with a narrow 12-10 score at Wembley Stadium.

As a result of his successful season, Shaul was included in the Super League Dream Team along with 5 of his teammates.

In 2017, Shaul once again won the Challenge Cup as Hull FC defeated Wigan Warriors by a score of 18-14 to win their second cup in as many years, the first time Hull have done this.

=== Hull RUFC ===
On 4 Oct 2023 it was reported that he had retired from rugby league and was joining rugby union side Hull RUFC

=== Goole Vikings ===
On 1 Oct 2024 it was reported that he had signed for Goole Vikings in the RFL League 1

== International career ==
In July 2018 he was selected in the England Knights Performance squad.

In 2018 he was selected for England against France at the Leigh Sports Village.

== Honours ==
=== Club ===
- Challenge Cup: (2) 2016, 2017
  - Runner-up: (1) 2013

=== Individual ===
- Super League Dream Team: (1) 2016
