= Danny Houghton =

English professional rugby league footballer

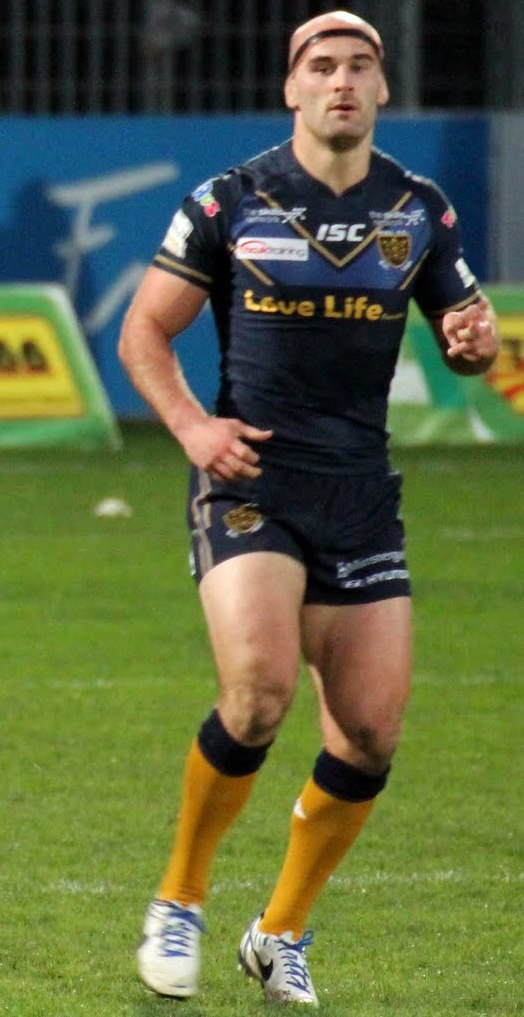

Personal information
- Full name: Daniel Jonathan Howard Houghton
- Born: 25 September 1988 (age 37) Kingston upon Hull, Humberside, England
- Height: 5 ft 8 in (1.73 m)
- Weight: 12 st 13 lb (82 kg)

Playing information
- Position: Hooker
Club
Years	Team	Pld	T	G	FG	P
2007–24	Hull FC	448	55	0	0	220
Representative
Years	Team	Pld	T	G	FG	P
2011–12	England Knights	3	2	0	0	8
- Source: As of 31 July 2023

Danny Houghton (born 25 September 1988) is a former English rugby league footballer who played as a hooker for Hull FC in the Super League. Born in Kingston upon Hull, he has played his entire career for his hometown club, and had recently come back to the game after retirement to play for Leigh miners, and has represented the England Knights internationally.

== Background ==
Houghton was born in Kingston upon Hull, Humberside, England.

== Early career ==
Signing for Hull from amateur side East Hull, he progressed through the club's academy ranks to make his début in 2007. His position of choice is hooker, although he only established himself there during his time in the Hull academy, having previously played as a scrum-half.

== Playing career ==
=== Hull F.C. ===
The start of the 2008 season saw Houghton gain a regular place in the first team, often being used from the bench.

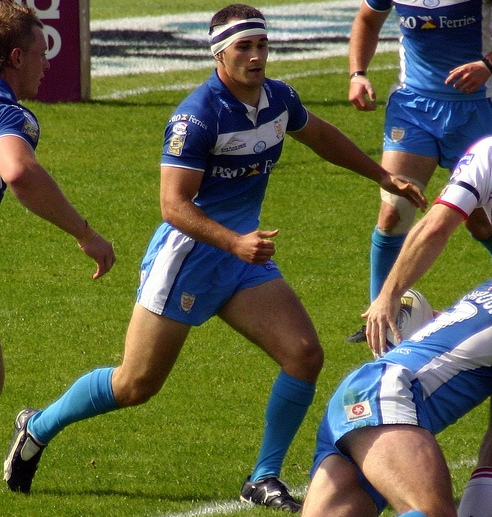
Houghton in action for Hull in 2008

Houghton quickly established himself as Hull's starting hooker, and was also handed the vice-captaincy of the team. He was in Hull's 2013 Challenge Cup Final team, losing out to Wigan Warriors by a score of 16–0.

Houghton had his most successful season to date in 2016. He starred in Hull's Challenge Cup-winning team, making a try-saving tackle in the final minutes as Hull beat Warrington Wolves 12–10.

As a result of Houghton's incredible season he was awarded with the Man of Steel award for Super League player of the year, the first Hull F.C. player to win the award. He also won the Super League Hit Man award for most tackles in a season with 1289 tackles, an award that he had previously won on three occasions, and was included in the 2016 Super League Dream Team.

Houghton's success would continue in 2017 when Hull F.C. won the Challenge Cup for a second year in a row with an 18–14 win over the Wigan Warriors at Wembley Stadium, a repeat of the 2013 final that he had also played in.

In January 2018, Houghton was appointed as the Hull F.C. captain.

He played 14 games for Hull F.C. in the 2020 Super League season including the club's semi-final defeat against Wigan as they got to within one game of the grand final.

In April 2021, Houghton broke the rugby league record for the most tackles in a single match. He made 85 tackles against Warrington Wolves, surpassing the previous record held by Elijah Taylor, who made 77 tackles for Wests Tigers in a match against North Queensland Cowboys in 2015. Houghton played 22 games for Hull F.C. for in the Super League XXVIII season as the club finished 10th on the table. On 30 August 2024, Houghton announced that he would be retiring from rugby league at the end of the 2024 Super League season.

=== Representative career ===
Houghton represented the England Knights, making his debut against France in 2011. He was selected as the Knights' captain for the 2012 European Cup tournament.

He is eligible to represent Scotland, but turned down the opportunity to play for them, as he hoped to be selected for England. He was called up by England for the first time in 2017 for a training camp as part of the team's preparations for the upcoming World Cup, but is still uncapped.

== Honours ==
=== Club ===
- Challenge Cup: (2) 2016, 2017
  - Runner-up: (1) 2013

=== Individual ===
- Super League Man of Steel: (1) 2016
- Super League Dream Team: (1) 2016
- Super League Hit Man: (6) 2011, 2013, 2015, 2016, 2019, 2022
