= England Knights =

Rugby league team of England

Team information
- Nickname: The Knights
- Governing body: Rugby Football League
- Region: Europe
- Head coach: Paul Anderson
- Captain: TBA
- Most caps: Jodie Broughton (5)
- Top try-scorer: Jodie Broughton (6)
- Top point-scorer: Luke Gale (28)

Team results
- First international
- (England) Knights 38–18 France (15 October 2011)
- Biggest win
- (England) Knights 62–4 Ireland (16 June 2012)

England Knights is the feeder team for the England national rugby league team. The Knights play a key role in the development of emerging talent, allowing players to gain experience in an international environment and to compete for a place in the England first team.

== History ==
=== 1990s and 2000s: Background ===
The idea of a second England team originated in the 1990s as "Emerging England" to give young players a chance to play internationally before being called up to the senior side. Throughout the late 1990s and 2000s Emerging England played against the senior sides of developing nations. In another incarnation as "England A" (not to be confused with the Amateur Four Nations team), the team took on the Australian national rugby league team in the second game of the 2003 Kangaroo tour of Great Britain and France. Australia defeated England A 26–22 in front of 6,817 fans.

=== 2011–13: Formation ===
England Knights were officially formed in 2011, eight years after England A played Australia. A squad of players under 25 were chosen play against France and where they came out 38–18 victors. The following year they competed in and won the 2012 European Championship and defeated Samoa in a 2013 test match.

=== 2014–17: Hiatus ===
The England Knights team was not utilised between 2014 and 2017.

=== 2018: Return ===
In 2018 it was announced that the Knights would go on a two series tour of Papua New Guinea.

== Competitive Records ==
=== Overview ===
| Opponent | Matches | Won | Drawn | Lost | Win % |
|---|---|---|---|---|---|
| Total | 8 | 7 | 0 | 1 | 88% |
| Cumbria | 1 | 1 | 0 | 0 | 100% |
| France | 1 | 1 | 0 | 0 | 100% |
| Ireland | 2 | 2 | 0 | 0 | 100% |
| Jamaica | 1 | 1 | 0 | 0 | 100% |
| Papua New Guinea | 2 | 1 | 0 | 1 | 50% |
| Samoa | 1 | 1 | 0 | 0 | 100% |
| Scotland | 1 | 1 | 0 | 0 | 100% |

=== List ===
As England A

| Date | Home team | Score | Away team | Competition | Location | Attendance | Ref. |
|---|---|---|---|---|---|---|---|
| 30 October 2002 | England A | 12–34 | New Zealand | Friendly | | | |
| 28 October 2003 | England A | 22–26 | Australia | Friendly | Griffin Park, London | 6,817 | |

As England Knights

| Date | Home team | Score | Away team | Competition | Location | Attendance | Ref. |
|---|---|---|---|---|---|---|---|
| 15 October 2011 | England Knights | 38–18 | France | Friendly | | 2,071 | |
| 22 October 2011 | Cumbria | 12–26 | England Knights | Friendly | | 1,163 | |
| 16 June 2012 | England Knights | 62–4 | Ireland | Friendly | | 11,083 | |
| 20 October 2012 | Ireland | 4–56 | England Knights | 2012 European Championship | Deramore Park, Belfast | | |
| 28 October 2012 | Scotland | 24–62 | England Knights | 2012 European Championship | Meggetland Stadium, Edinburgh | | |
| 19 October 2013 | England Knights | 52–16 | Samoa | Friendly | | | |
| 27 October 2018 | Papua New Guinea | 12–16 | England Knights | 2018 Knights tour | Lae, Papua New Guinea | | |
| 3 November 2018 | Papua New Guinea | 32–22 | England Knights | 2018 Knights tour | Port Moresby, Papua New Guinea | | |
| 20 October 2019 | England Knights | 38–6 | Jamaica | Friendly | Headingley Stadium, Leeds | 7,113 | |
| 15 October 2021 | England Knights | 56–4 | Jamaica | Friendly | Wheldon Road, Castleford | 2,250 | |
| 1 October 2022 | France B | 6–18 | England Knights | Friendly | Bordeaux | | |
| 9 October 2022 | Scotland | 4–28 | England Knights | Friendly | Edinburgh | | |

== Honours ==
- European Championship: 2012

== Women's rugby ==
On 26 July 2022, a women's knights team was launched. The team is managed by Leeds Rhinos head coach Lois Forsell. The team called up a performance squad to training camps in 2023 and 2024.

=== List of results ===
| Date | Home team | Score | Away team | Competition | Location | Attendance | Ref. |
|---|---|---|---|---|---|---|---|
| 27 October 2022 | England Knights | 14–26 | Cook Islands | Friendly | Weetwood Sports Park, Leeds | | |
