= 2021 Hull Kingston Rovers season =

English rugby league season

Team information
- CEO: Neil Hudgell
- Head Coach: Tony Smith
- Stadium: KCOM Craven Park; Kingston upon Hull, East Riding of Yorkshire
← 2020	2022 →

In the 2021 rugby league season, Hull Kingston Rovers competed in Super League XXVI and the 2021 Challenge Cup. They were coached by Tony Smith.

== Results ==
=== Super League ===
==== Table ====
Pos	Team	Pld	W	D	L	PF	PA	PP	Pts	PCT	Qualification (Note: Teams must have played at least 70% of scheduled fixtures to qualify for the play-offs.)
1	Catalans Dragons (L)	23	19	0	4	688	398	172.9	38	82.61	Semi-final
2	St. Helens (C)	21	16	0	5	548	229	239.3	32	76.19	Semi-final
3	Warrington Wolves	21	15	1	5	588	354	166.1	31	73.81	Elimination Semi-finals
4	Wigan Warriors	25	15	0	10	387	385	100.5	30	60.00	Elimination Semi-finals
5	Leeds Rhinos	24	13	0	11	556	440	126.4	26	54.17	Elimination Semi-finals
6	Hull Kingston Rovers	20	10	0	10	497	458	108.5	20	50.00	Elimination Semi-finals
7	Castleford Tigers	23	11	0	12	437	552	79.2	22	47.83	
8	Hull FC	21	8	1	12	409	476	85.9	17	40.48	
9	Huddersfield Giants	24	9	0	15	460	516	89.1	18	37.50	
10	Wakefield Trinity	24	9	0	15	482	548	88.0	18	37.50	
11	Salford Red Devils	22	7	0	15	402	584	68.8	14	31.82	
12	Leigh Centurions (R)	22	2	0	20	356	870	40.9	4	9.09	Relegated to the Championship

Rules for classification: 1) win percentage; 2) points scored percentage (points scored divided by points conceded).
(C) Champions; (L) League Leaders' Shield Winners; (R) Relegated

==== Super League results ====
W Win D Draw L Loss

Super League results
Date	Round	Versus	H/A	Venue	Result	Score	Tries	Goals	Attendance	Report
27 March	1	Catalans Dragons	N	Emerald Headingley	L	28–29			—N/a (Note: Played behind closed doors due to the COVID-19 pandemic)	RLP
1 April	2	St Helens	N	Totally Wicked Stadium	L	0–25			—N/a	RLP
16 April	3	Huddersfield Giants	H	Hull College Craven Park	W	25–24			—N/a	RLP
23 April	4	Leeds Rhinos	H	Hull College Craven Park	W	26–6			—N/a	RLP
1 May	5	Warrington Wolves	A	Halliwell Jones Stadium	L	26–50			—N/a	RLP
17 May	6	Castleford Tigers	A	Mend-A-Hose Jungle	W	26–22			3,600	RLP
23 May	7	Wakefield Trinity	A	Mobile Rocket Stadium	L	12–28			4,000	RLP
30 May	8	Leigh Centurions	H	Hull College Craven Park	W	40–16			4,000	RLP
11 June	9	Salford Red Devils	H	Hull College Craven Park	W	40–4			4,000	RLP
18 June	10	Wigan Warriors	A	DW Stadium	W	18–8			5,018	RLP
24 July	13	Catalans Dragons	H	Stade Gilbert Brutus	L	30–32				RLP
2 August	17	Catalans Dragons	H	Hull College Craven Park	L	16–23			6,347	RLP
8 August	18	Leigh Centurions	A	Leigh Sports Village	W	34–28			2,541	RLP
13 August	19	Wigan Warriors	H	Hull College Craven Park	W	26–14			6,230	RLP
21 August	20	Hull F.C.	A	MKM Stadium	L	22–23			15,000	RLP
26 August	21	Wakefield Trinity	H	Hull College Craven Park	L	18–25				RLP
30 August	22	Huddersfield Giants	A	John Smiths Stadium	L	28–40			3,652	RLP
5 September	23	Leigh Centurions	N	St James' Park	W	44–6			25,762	RLP
11 September	24	Castleford Tigers	H	Hull College Craven Park	W	26–19				RLP
17 September	25	Leeds Rhinos	A	Emerald Headingley	L	12–36				RLP

==== Play-offs ====
Play-off results
Date	Round	Versus	H/A	Venue	Result	Score	Tries	Goals	Attendance	Report
24 September	Eliminators	Warrington Wolves	A	Halliwell Jones Stadium	W	19–0				RLP
30 September	Semi-finals	Catalans Dragons	A	Stade Gilbert Brutus	L	10–28			11,530	RLP

===== Team bracket =====
Eliminators
3	Warrington Wolves	0
6	Hull Kingston Rovers	19
4	Wigan Warriors	0
5	Leeds Rhinos	8

Semi-finals
1	Catalans Dragons	28
6	Hull Kingston Rovers	10
2	St Helens	36
5	Leeds Rhinos	8

Grand Final
1	Catalans Dragons	10
2	St Helens	12

Source:Rugby League Project

=== Challenge Cup ===
W Win L Loss

Challenge Cup results
Date	Round	Versus	H/A	Venue	Result	Score	Tries	Goals	Attendance	Report
9 April	3	Castleford Tigers	H	Hull College Craven Park	L	32–33	Abdull, Kenny-Dowall, Parcell, Quinlan, Ryan, Vete	Abdull (2), Lewis (2)	—N/a (Note: Broadcast on Our League)	RLP

== Squad ==
Hull Kingston Rovers 2021 Squad
First team squad			Coaching staff
1 (Australia) Adam Quinlan – FB; 2 (England) Ben Crooks – WG, CE; 3 (England) Greg Minikin – CE, WG; 4 (New Zealand) Shaun Kenny-Dowall – CE, WG; 5 (England) Ryan Hall – WG; 7 (England) Jordan Abdull – SH, SO, LF (GK); 8 (Tonga) Albert Vete – PR; 9 (Australia) Matt Parcell – HK; 10 (Fiji) Korbin Sims – PR, LF; 11 (Cook Islands) Brad Takairangi – SR, CE; 12 (Scotland) Kane Linnett – SR, CE; 13 (England) Dean Hadley – LF, HK; 14 (England) Jez Litten – HK	15 (England) George Lawler – LF, PR, SR; 16 (Ireland) George King – LF, PR; 17 (England) Elliot Minchella – SR; 18 (England) Matty Storton – SR, LF; 19 (England) Will Dagger – FB, WG (GK); 20 (England) Mikey Lewis – SH, SO; 21 (England) Owen Harrison – SR, LF; 23 (Ireland) Ethan Ryan – WG; 24 (Ireland) Joe Keyes – SO, SH; 25 (England) Rowan Milnes – SO, SH; 26 (England) Will Maher – PR; 27 (England) Luis Johnson – PR	28 (Nigeria) Muizz Mustapha – PR; 29 (England) Anesu Mudoti – PR; 30 (England) Will Tate – WG, FB; 31 (England) Thomas Whur – PR; 32 (England) Charlie Cavanaugh – HK; 33 (Germany) Jimmy Keinhorst – CE	Head coach: (Australia) Tony Smith; Legend: (c) Captain(s); (vc) Vice-captain(s); Injured; GK = Goal Kicker; Updated: 21 February 2021; Source(s): 2021 Squad Numbers
