= 2020 Hull Kingston Rovers season =

- Super League Rank: 11
- Challenge Cup: Quarter-final (lost to Leeds Rhinos 18–48)
- 2020 record: Wins: 4; draws: 0; losses: 15
- Points scored: For: 290; against: 526

Team information
- CEO: Neil Hudgell
- Head Coach: Tony Smith
- Stadium: KCOM Craven Park; Kingston upon Hull, East Riding of Yorkshire
- Avg. attendance: 7,668
- Agg. attendance: 23,306
- High attendance: 8,492
- Low attendance: 7,350

Top scorers
- Tries: Ben Crooks (11)
- Goals: Jamie Ellis (18)
- Points: Ben Crooks (44)

This article details the Hull Kingston Rovers's rugby league football club's 2020 season.

== Fixtures and results ==
Win Draw Loss

- All fixtures are subject to change

=== Challenge Cup ===
Date and time	Rnd	Versus	H/A	Venue	Result	Score	Tries	Goals	Attendance	TV	Report
15 March, 15:00	5	Leigh Centurions	H	KCOM Craven Park	W	22–19	Linnett, Kenny Dowall, Dagger, Rawsthorne	Lewis (3)		—N/a	
18 September 2020, 20:15	6	Leeds Rhinos	A	Totally Wicked Stadium (Note: all games will resume behind closed doors, at neutral venues due to the COVID-19 pandemic in the United Kingdom)	L	18–48	Ellis (2), Litten	Ellis (3)	0 (Note: "Match Played behind closed doors)	BBC One	

=== Regular season ===
Date and time	Rnd	Versus	H/A	Venue	Result	Score	Tries	Goals	Attendance	TV	Report
2 February, 19:45	1	Wakefield Trinity	H	KCOM Craven Park	W	30–12	Crooks (4), Brierley, Minikin	Ellis (3)	8,492	—N/a	Report
7 February, 19:45	2	Hull FC	A	KCOM Stadium	L	12–25	Livett, Quinlan, Crooks	Ellis (2)	19,599	Sky Sports	Report
14 February, 19:45	3	Leeds Rhinos	A	Headingley	L	10–52	Minikin, Abdull	Brierley	11,057	—N/a	
21 February, 19:45	4	Huddersfield Giants	H	KCOM Craven Park	L	4–22	Crooks	—N/a	7,350	—N/a	
27 February, 19:45	5	Castleford Tigers	H	KCOM Craven Park	L	8–28	Crooks	Brierley (2)	7,464	Sky Sports	
8 March, 15:00	6	Wigan Warriors	A	DW Stadium	L	16–30	Ryan, Minikin, Brierley	Brierley (2)	11,511	—N/a	
8 August 2020, 18:30	8	Warrington Wolves	A	Emerald Headingley	L	10–40	Crooks, Quinlan	Brierley	0 (Note: Match played behind closed doors)	Sky Sports	
30 August 2020, 13:00	10	St Helens	A	Halliwell Jones Stadium	L	18–32	Quinlan, Ryan, Parcell	Ellis (3)	0	Sky Sports	
3 September 2020, 18:00	11	Wigan Warriors	A	Emerald Headingley	W	34–18	Minchella (2), Minikin (3), Hadley	Lewis (2), Dagger (2), Abdull	0	Sky Sports	
11 September 2020, 18:00	12	St Helens	A	Totally Wicked Stadium	L	20–21 (Note: After golden-point extra time)	Hadley, Kenny-Dowall, Ryan	Dagger (4)	0	Sky Sports	

=== Challenge Cup ===
Date and time	Rnd	Versus	H/A	Venue	Result	Score	Tries	Goals	Attendance	TV	Report
TBC	5	Leigh Centurions	H	KCOM Craven Park							

== League standings ==
Pos	Team	Pld	W	D	L	PF	PA	PP	Pts	PCT	Qualification (Note: Where teams have the same win percentage, position is decided by points scored percentage (points scored divided by points conceded).)
1	Wigan Warriors (L)	17	13	0	4	408	278	146.8	26	76.47	Semi-finals
2	St Helens (C)	17	12	0	5	469	195	240.5	24	70.59	Semi-finals
3	Warrington Wolves (Note: Salford forfeited a game against Warrington. Under RFL operational rules, the game is recorded as a 24–0 victory for Warrington and converse loss for Salford with the points scored/conceded applying to both teams.)	17	12	0	5	365	204	178.9	24	70.59	Elimination semi-finals
4	Catalans Dragons	13	8	0	5	376	259	145.2	16	61.54	Elimination semi-finals
5	Leeds Rhinos	17	10	0	7	369	390	94.6	20	58.82	Elimination semi-finals
6	Hull F.C.	17	9	0	8	405	436	92.9	18	52.94	Elimination semi-finals
7	Huddersfield Giants (Note: Huddersfield were placed on standby to take the place of any of the four teams in the elimination finals should one be unable to fulfil their fixture.)	18	7	0	11	318	367	86.6	14	38.89	
8	Castleford Tigers	16	6	0	10	328	379	86.5	12	37.50	
9	Salford Red Devils	18	8	0	10	354	469	75.5	10 (Note: Salford deducted 3 wins by the Rugby Football League for failing to meet the terms of a financial commitment agreed in 2013.)	27.78	
10	Wakefield Trinity	19	5	0	14	324	503	64.4	10	26.32	
11	Hull Kingston Rovers	17	3	0	14	290	526	55.1	6	17.65	

Source: BBC Sport
Rules for classification: 1) Points; 2) Points difference; 3) Number of points scored;
(C) Champions; (L) League Leaders' Shield Winners

== Player statistics ==
#	Player	Position	Tries	Goals	DG	Points	Red Cards	Yellow Cards
1	Adam Quinlan	Fullback	1	0	0	4	0	1
2	Ben Crooks	Wing	7	0	0	28	0	0
3	Shaun Kenny Dowall	Centre	0	0	0	0	0	0
4	Kane Linnett	Centre	0	0	0	0	0	0
5	Greg Minikin	Wing	3	0	0	12	0	0
7	Jordan Abdull	Scrum-half	1	0	0	4	0	0
8	Robbie Mulhern	Prop	0	0	0	0	0	0
9	Matt Parcell	Hooker	0	0	0	0	0	0
11	Weller Hauraki	Second-row	0	0	0	0	0	0
12	Harvey Livett	Second-row	1	0	0	4	0	0
13	Dean Hadley	Loose forward	0	0	0	0	0	0
14	Mitch Garbutt	Prop	0	0	0	0	0	0
15	George Lawler	Loose forward	0	0	0	0	0	0
16	Daniel Murray	Prop	0	0	0	0	0	0
17	Kyle Trout	Loose forward	0	0	0	0	0	0
18	Jez Litten	Hooker	0	0	0	0	0	0
19	Will Dagger	Wing	0	0	0	0	0	0
20	Mikey Lewis	Scrum-half	0	0	0	0	0	0
21	Owen Harrison	Loose forward	0	0	0	0	0	0
22	Nick Rawsthorne	Centre	0	0	0	0	0	0
23	Ethan Ryan	Wing	1	0	0	4	0	0
24	Joe Keyes	Scrum-half	0	0	0	0	0	0
25	Matty Gee	Second-row	0	0	0	0	0	0
26	Will Maher	Prop	0	0	0	0	0	0
27	Elliott Minchella	Second-row	0	0	0	0	0	0
28	Matthew Storton	Second-row	0	0	0	0	0	0
29	Anesuu Mudoti	Prop	0	0	0	0	0	0
30	Jamie Ellis	Scrum-half	0	5	0	10	0	0
31	Ryan Brierley	Scrum-half	2	5	0	18	0	0

== Coaching team ==
Nat	Staff name	Position	Previous club
(Australia)	Tony Smith	Head coach	Warrington Wolves
(Australia)	James Webster	Assistant coach	Balmain Tigers, Widnes Vikings
(England)	David Hodgson	Assistant coach	Halifax, Wigan Warriors, Salford City Reds
(England)	Jamie Elkaleh	Performance coach	Salford City Reds, Warrington Wolves
(Republic of Ireland)	Shane Carney	Head of Strength & Conditioning	Hull F.C.
(Scotland)	Dan Ramsden	Head of physiotherapy	Bradford Bulls
(England)	Alan Fellows	Kit Man	
(England)	Sue Thompson	Player Welfare Manager	

=== Past coaches ===
- Bryn Knowelden 1952–1955
- Colin Hutton 1957–1970
- Johnny Whiteley 1970–1972
- Harry Poole 1975–1977
- Roger Millward 1977–1991
- George Fairbairn 1991–1994
- Steve Crooks 1994–1997
- Dave Harrison 1997–2000
- Gary Wilkinson 2000–2002
- Steve Linnane 2002–2004
- Martin Hall 2003–2004
- Mal Reilly 2003–2004
- Harvey Howard 2004–2005
- Justin Morgan 2005–2011
- Craig Sandercock 2012–2014
- Chris Chester 2014–2016
- James Webster 2016–2017
- Tim Sheens 2017-2019

== 2020 squad ==
Hull Kingston Rovers 2020 Squad
First team squad			Coaching staff
1 Adam Quinlan – FB; 2 Ben Crooks – WG, CE; 3 Shaun Kenny-Dowall – CE, WG; 4 Kane Linnett – CE, SR; 5 Greg Minikin – WG, CE; 6 Retired number; 7 Jordan Abdull – SO, LF, SH; 8 Robbie Mulhern – PR; 9 Matt Parcell – HK; 10 Retired; 11 Weller Hauraki – SR, LF; 12 Harvey Livett – SR, CE, SH; 13 Dean Hadley – LF, SR, HK	14 Mitch Garbutt – PR; 15 George Lawler – LF, PR, HK; 16 Dan Murray – PR; 17 Kyle Trout – PR, LF; 18 Jez Litten – HK, SH; 19 Will Dagger – FB, WG, SH, SO; 20 Mikey Lewis – SH; 21 Owen Harrison – LF; 22 Nick Rawsthorne – FB, CE, WG; 23 Ethan Ryan – FB, CE, WG; 24 Joe Keyes – SH, SO; 25 Matty Gee – SR, LF; 26 Will Maher – PR	27 Elliott Minchella – SR, LF; 28 Matthew Storton – SR; 29 Anesu Mudoti – PR; 30 Jamie Ellis – SH, SO, HK; 31 Ryan Brierley – SH, SO	Head coach: Tony Smith; Assistant coaches: Willie Poching; David Hodgson; Legend: (c) Captain(s); (vc) Vice-captain(s); Updated: 8 January 2019; Source(s): 2020 Squad Numbers

== 2020 transfers ==
=== Gains ===
Player	Signed from	Years signed	Date
(England) Kyle Trout	Dewsbury Rams	1 years	August 2019
(England) Jordan Abdull	London Broncos	2 years	September 2019
(England) Harvey Livett	Warrington Wolves	Season Long Loan	September 2019
(England) Ethan Ryan	Bradford Bulls	2 years	September 2019
(England) Matty Gee	London Broncos	1 year	October 2019
(England) Joe Keyes	Bradford Bulls	3 years	October 2019
(England) Rowan Milnes	Bradford Bulls	3 years	October 2019
(England) Elliott Minchella	Bradford Bulls	3 Years	October 2019
Anesu Mudoti	Bradford Bulls	3 Years	October 2019
(England) Nick Rawsthorne	Toronto Wolfpack	2 years	October 2019
(England) Matthew Storton	Bradford Bulls	3 Years	October 2019
(Australia) Matt Parcell	Leeds Rhinos	1 year	October 2019
(Scotland) Ryan Brierley	Toronto Wolfpack	1 Year	December 2019
(England) Jamie Ellis	Castleford Tigers	1 Year	December 2019

=== Losses ===
Player	Signed for	Contract	Date
(England) Chris Atkin	Salford Red Devils	1 year	September 2019
(England) James Greenwood	Salford Red Devils	1 year	September 2019
(England) Ryan Lannon	Salford Red Devils	1 year	October 2019
(England) Joel Tomkins	Catalans Dragons	2 years	October 2019
(Australia) Josh Drinkwater	Catalans Dragons	2 Years	October 2019
(England) Craig Hall	Featherstone Rovers	1 Year	October 2019
(England) Lee Jewitt	Barrow Raiders	1 year	October 2019
(Scotland) Will Oakes	Dewsbury Rams	Season Loan	November 2019
(England) Danny Addy	Workington Town	1 Year	December 2018
(England) Shaun Lunt	Batley Bulldogs	N/A	December 2019
(England) Ryan Shaw	Yorkshire Carnegie	N/A	December 2019
(England) Danny McGuire	Retired	N/A	N/A
