= 2016 Hull FC season =

- Super League XXI Rank: 1st
- Play-off result: Semi Final
- Challenge Cup: Winners
- 2016 record: Wins: 19; draws: 0; losses: 6
- Points scored: For: 605; against: 465

Team information
- Chairman: Adam Pearson
- Head Coach: Lee Radford
- Captain: Gareth Ellis
- Stadium: KC Stadium

Top scorers
- Tries: Fetuli Talanoa - 15
- Goals: Marc Sneyd - 110
- Points: Marc Sneyd - 239
← 2015	List of seasons	2017 →

This article details the Hull F.C. rugby league football club's 2016 season. This is the 21st season of the Super League era.

== Table ==
=== Super League table ===
Pos	Team	Pld	W	D	L	PF	PA	PD	Pts	Qualification
1	Hull F.C.	23	17	0	6	605	465	+140	34	Super League Super 8s
2	Warrington Wolves	23	16	1	6	675	425	+250	33	Super League Super 8s
3	Wigan Warriors	23	16	0	7	455	440	+15	32	Super League Super 8s
4	St Helens	23	14	0	9	573	536	+37	28	Super League Super 8s
5	Catalans Dragons	23	13	0	10	593	505	+88	26	Super League Super 8s
6	Castleford Tigers	23	10	1	12	617	640	−23	21	Super League Super 8s
7	Widnes Vikings	23	10	0	13	499	474	+25	20	Super League Super 8s
8	Wakefield Trinity Wildcats	23	10	0	13	485	654	−169	20	Super League Super 8s
9	Leeds Rhinos	23	8	0	15	404	576	−172	16	The Qualifiers
10	Salford City Reds	23	10	0	13	560	569	−9	14 (Note: Salford deducted 6 points for salary cap breaches in 2014 and 2015.)	The Qualifiers
11	Hull Kingston Rovers	23	6	2	15	486	610	−124	14	The Qualifiers
12	Huddersfield Giants	23	6	0	17	511	569	−58	12	The Qualifiers

Source: Rugby League Project
Rules for classification: 1) Points; 2) Points difference; 3) Number of points scored;

=== Super 8s table ===
Pos	Team	Pld	W	D	L	PF	PA	PD	Pts	Qualification
1	Warrington Wolves (L)	30	21	1	8	852	541	+311	43	Semi-finals
2	Wigan Warriors (C)	30	21	0	9	669	560	+109	42	Semi-finals
3	Hull F.C.	30	20	0	10	749	579	+170	40	Semi-finals
4	St Helens	30	20	0	10	756	641	+115	40	Semi-finals
5	Castleford Tigers	30	15	1	14	830	808	+22	31	
6	Catalans Dragons	30	15	0	15	723	716	+7	30	
7	Widnes Vikings	30	12	0	18	603	643	−40	24	
8	Wakefield Trinity	30	10	0	20	571	902	−331	20	

Source: BBC Sport
(C) Champions; (L) League Leaders' Shield Winners

== Super League ==
=== Key ===
LEGEND
Win
Draw
Loss

=== Regular season ===
Date	Competition	Rnd	Vrs	H/A	Venue	Result	Score	Tries	Goals	Att	Live on TV
5/2/16	Super League XXI	1	Salford	H	KC Stadium	W	42-20	Pryce, Fonua, Thompson, Talanoa, Tuimavave, Bowden, Logan, Shaul	Sneyd 5/8	12,265	-
13/2/16	Super League XXI	2	Catalans Dragons	A	Stade Gilbert Brutus	W	38-10	Talanoa (2), Manu, Bowden, Logan, Ellis, Shaul	Sneyd 5/8	10,234	Sky Sports
25/2/16	Super League XXI	3	Castleford	H	KC Stadium	L	24-31	Thompson, Michaels, Shaul (2)	Sneyd 4/4	10,247	Sky Sports
4/3/16	Super League XXI	4	Wigan	H	KC Stadium	L	25-26	Michaels (2), Pryce, Manu	Sneyd 4/4, Sneyd 1 DG	10,660	-
10/3/16	Super League XXI	5	Widnes	A	Halton Stadium	L	6-46	Pritchard	Sneyd 1/1	4,735	Sky Sports
18/3/16	Super League XXI	6	Wakefield Trinity	H	KC Stadium	W	22-4	Minichiello (2), Naughton, Tuimavave	Sneyd 3/4	9,600	-
25/3/16	Super League XXI	7	Hull Kingston Rovers	A	Craven Park	W	22-20	Shaul, Houghton, Fonua, Michaels	Sneyd 3/4	Attendance	Sky Sports
28/3/16	Super League XXI	8	Warrington	H	KC Stadium	W	26-24	Sneyd, Shaul, Naughton (2), Yeaman	Sneyd 3/5	9,967	-
1/4/16	Super League XXI	9	St. Helens	A	Langtree Park	W/D/L	Score	Try Scorers	Goal Scorers	Attendance	-

=== Super 8's ===
Date	Competition	Rnd	Vrs	H/A	Venue	Result	Score	Tries	Goals	Att	Live on TV
0/0/16	Super League XXI	S1	Team	H/A	Stadium	W/D/L	Score	Try Scorers	Goal Scorers	Attendance	TV
0/0/16	Super League XXI	S2	Team	H/A	Stadium	W/D/L	Score	Try Scorers	Goal Scorers	Attendance	TV
0/0/16	Super League XXI	S3	Team	H/A	Stadium	W/D/L	Score	Try Scorers	Goal Scorers	Attendance	TV
0/0/16	Super League XXI	S4	Team	H/A	Stadium	W/D/L	Score	Try Scorers	Goal Scorers	Attendance	TV
0/0/16	Super League XXI	S5	Team	H/A	Stadium	W/D/L	Score	Try Scorers	Goal Scorers	Attendance	TV
0/0/16	Super League XXI	S6	Team	H/A	Stadium	W/D/L	Score	Try Scorers	Goal Scorers	Attendance	TV
0/0/16	Super League XXI	S7	Team	H/A	Stadium	W/D/L	Score	Try Scorers	Goal Scorers	Attendance	TV

=== Player appearances ===
FB=Fullback	C=Centre	W=Winger	SO=Stand-off	SH=Scrum half	PR=Prop	H=Hooker	SR=Second Row	L=Loose forward	B=Bench

No	Player	1	2	3	4	5	6	7	8	9	10	12	13	14	15	16	17	18	19	11	20	21	22	23	S1	S2	S3	S4	S5	S6	S7
1	Jamie Shaul	FB	FB	FB	FB	FB	FB	FB	FB	x	x	x	x	x	x	x	x	x	x	x	x	x	x	x	x	x	x	x	x	x	x
2	Mahe Fonua	W						C		x	x	x	x	x	x	x	x	x	x	x	x	x	x	x	x	x	x	x	x	x	x
3	Carlos Tuimavave	C	C	C	C	C	SO	SO		x	x	x	x	x	x	x	x	x	x	x	x	x	x	x	x	x	x	x	x	x	x
4	Jack Logan	C	C	C	C	C	C			x	x	x	x	x	x	x	x	x	x	x	x	x	x	x	x	x	x	x	x	x	x
5	Fetuli Talanoa	W	W	W	W	W				x	x	x	x	x	x	x	x	x	x	x	x	x	x	x	x	x	x	x	x	x	x
6	Leon Pryce	SO	SO	SO	SO					x	x	x	x	x	x	x	x	x	x	x	x	x	x	x	x	x	x	x	x	x	x
7	Marc Sneyd	SH	SH	SH	SH	SH	SH	SH	SH	x	x	x	x	x	x	x	x	x	x	x	x	x	x	x	x	x	x	x	x	x	x
8	Scott Taylor	P	P	P	P	P	P	P	B	x	x	x	x	x	x	x	x	x	x	x	x	x	x	x	x	x	x	x	x	x	x
9	Danny Houghton	H	H	H	H	H	H	H	H	x	x	x	x	x	x	x	x	x	x	x	x	x	x	x	x	x	x	x	x	x	x
10	Liam Watts	P	P	P	P	B	B	P	P	x	x	x	x	x	x	x	x	x	x	x	x	x	x	x	x	x	x	x	x	x	x
11	Gareth Ellis		B	B	L	L	L	L	SR	x	x	x	x	x	x	x	x	x	x	x	x	x	x	x	x	x	x	x	x	x	x
12	Mark Minichiello	SR	SR	SR	SR	B	SR	SR		x	x	x	x	x	x	x	x	x	x	x	x	x	x	x	x	x	x	x	x	x	x
13	Jordan Abdull					SO			SO	x	x	x	x	x	x	x	x	x	x	x	x	x	x	x	x	x	x	x	x	x	x
14	Iafeta Paleaaesina							B	B	x	x	x	x	x	x	x	x	x	x	x	x	x	x	x	x	x	x	x	x	x	x
15	Chris Green	B			B		B	B	B	x	x	x	x	x	x	x	x	x	x	x	x	x	x	x	x	x	x	x	x	x	x
16	Jordan Thompson	L	L	L	B	B				x	x	x	x	x	x	x	x	x	x	x	x	x	x	x	x	x	x	x	x	x	x
17	Dean Hadley	x	x	x	x	x	x	x	SR	x	x	x	x	x	x	x	x	x	x	x	x	x	x	x	x	x	x	x	x	x	x
19	Steve Michaels	x	W	W	W	W	W	W	C	x	x	x	x	x	x	x	x	x	x	x	x	x	x	x	x	x	x	x	x	x	x
20	Curtis Naughton	x	x	x	x	x	W	W	W	x	x	x	x	x	x	x	x	x	x	x	x	x	x	x	x	x	x	x	x	x	x
21	Sika Manu	SR	SR	SR	SR	SR	SR			x	x	x	x	x	x	x	x	x	x	x	x	x	x	x	x	x	x	x	x	x	x
22	Josh Bowden	B	B	B	B	P	P	B	P	x	x	x	x	x	x	x	x	x	x	x	x	x	x	x	x	x	x	x	x	x	x
23	Frank Pritchard	B	B	B		SR	B	SR		x	x	x	x	x	x	x	x	x	x	x	x	x	x	x	x	x	x	x	x	x	x
24	Kirk Yeaman	x	x	x	x	x	C	C	C	x	x	x	x	x	x	x	x	x	x	x	x	x	x	x	x	x	x	x	x	x	x
25	Jansin Turgut	x	x	x	x	x	x	x	B	x	x	x	x	x	x	x	x	x	x	x	x	x	x	x	x	x	x	x	x	x	x
26	Jez Litten	x	x	x	x	x	x	x	x	x	x	x	x	x	x	x	x	x	x	x	x	x	x	x	x	x	x	x	x	x	x
27	Jack Downs	x	x	x	x	x	x	x	x	x	x	x	x	x	x	x	x	x	x	x	x	x	x	x	x	x	x	x	x	x	x
28	Brad Fash	x	x	x	x	x	x	x	x	x	x	x	x	x	x	x	x	x	x	x	x	x	x	x	x	x	x	x	x	x	x
29	Harry Tyson-Wilson	x	x	x	x	x	x	x	x	x	x	x	x	x	x	x	x	x	x	x	x	x	x	x	x	x	x	x	x	x	x
30	Danny Washbrook	B	B	B	B	B	B	B	L	x	x	x	x	x	x	x	x	x	x	x	x	x	x	x	x	x	x	x	x	x	x
31	Callum Lancaster	x	x	x	x	x	x	x	W	x	x	x	x	x	x	x	x	x	x	x	x	x	x	x	x	x	x	x	x	x	x
32	Reece Dean	x	x	x	x	x	x	x	x	x	x	x	x	x	x	x	x	x	x	x	x	x	x	x	x	x	x	x	x	x	x
33	Masimbaashe Motongo	x	x	x	x	x	x	x	x	x	x	x	x	x	x	x	x	x	x	x	x	x	x	x	x	x	x	x	x	x	x
34	Richard Whiting	x	x	x	x	x	x	x	x	x	x	x	x	x	x	x	x	x	x	x	x	x	x	x	x	x	x	x	x	x	x

= Injured

= Suspended

== Challenge Cup ==
LEGEND
Win
Draw
Loss

Date	Competition	Rnd	Vrs	H/A	Venue	Result	Score	Tries	Goals	Att	TV
0/0/16	Cup	5th	Team	H/A	Stadium	W/D/L	Score	Try Scorers	Goal Scorers	Attendance	TV

=== Player appearances ===
FB=Fullback	C=Centre	W=Winger	SO=Stand Off	SH=Scrum half	P=Prop	H=Hooker	SR=Second Row	L=Loose forward	B=Bench

No	Player	5
1	Jamie Shaul	x
2	Mahe Fonua	x
3	Carlos Tuimavave	x
4	Jack Logan	x
5	Fetuli Talanoa	x
6	Leon Pryce	x
7	Marc Sneyd	x
8	Scott Taylor	x
9	Danny Houghton	x
10	Liam Watts	x
11	Gareth Ellis	x
12	Mark Minichiello	x
13	Jordan Abdull	x
14	Iafeta Paleaaesina	x
15	Chris Green	x
16	Jordan Thompson	x
17	Dean Hadley	x
19	Steve Michaels	x
20	Curtis Naughton	x
21	Sika Manu	x
22	Josh Bowden	x
23	Frank Pritchard	x
24	Kirk Yeaman	x
25	Jansin Turgut	x
26	Jez Litten	x
27	Jack Downs	x
28	Brad Fash	x
29	Harry Tyson-Wilson	x
30	Danny Washbrook	x
31	Callum Lancaster	x
32	Reece Dean	x
33	Masimbaashe Motongo	x
34	Richard Whiting	x

== 2016 squad statistics ==
- Appearances and points include (Super League, Challenge Cup and Play-offs) as of 28 March 2016.

No	Player	Position	Age	Previous club	Apps	Tries	Goals	DG	Points
1	Jamie Shaul	Fullback	N/A	Hull FC Academy	8	6	0	0	24
2	Mahe Fonua	Wing	N/A	Melbourne Storm	2	2	0	0	8
3	Carlos Tuimavave	Centre	N/A	Newcastle Knights	7	2	0	0	8
4	Jack Logan	Centre	N/A	Hull FC Academy	6	2	0	0	8
5	Fetuli Talanoa	Wing	N/A	South Sydney Rabbitohs	5	3	0	0	12
6	Leon Pryce	Stand-off	N/A	Catalans Dragons	4	2	0	0	8
7	Marc Sneyd	Scrum-half	N/A	Salford Red Devils	8	1	28	1	61
8	Scott Taylor	Prop	N/A	Wigan Warriors	8	0	0	0	0
9	Danny Houghton	Hooker	N/A	Hull FC Academy	8	1	0	0	4
10	Liam Watts	Prop	N/A	Hull Kingston Rovers	8	0	0	0	0
11	Gareth Ellis	Second-row	N/A	Wests Tigers	7	1	0	0	4
12	Mark Minichiello	Second-row	N/A	Gold Coast Titans	7	2	0	0	8
13	Jordan Abdull	Loose forward	N/A	Hull FC Academy	2	0	0	0	0
14	Iafeta Paleaaesina	Prop	N/A	Limoux Grizzlies	2	0	0	0	0
15	Chris Green	Prop	N/A	Hull FC Academy	5	0	0	0	0
16	Jordan Thompson	Second-row	N/A	Castleford Tigers	5	2	0	0	8
17	Dean Hadley	Loose forward	N/A	Hull FC Academy	1	0	0	0	0
19	Steve Michaels	Centre	N/A	Gold Coast Titans	7	4	0	0	16
20	Curtis Naughton	Fullback	N/A	Sydney Roosters	3	3	0	0	12
21	Sika Manu	Prop	N/A	Penrith Panthers	6	2	0	0	8
22	Josh Bowden	Prop	N/A	Hull FC Academy	8	2	0	0	8
23	Frank Pritchard	Second-row	N/A	Canterbury Bulldogs	6	1	0	0	4
24	Kirk Yeaman	Centre	N/A	Hull FC Academy	3	1	0	0	4
25	Jansin Turgut	Loose forward	N/A	Hull FC Academy	1	0	0	0	0
26	Jez Litten	Hooker	N/A	Hull FC Academy	0	0	0	0	0
27	Jack Downs	Second-row	N/A	Hull FC Academy	0	0	0	0	0
28	Brad Fash	Second-row	N/A	Hull FC Academy	0	0	0	0	0
29	Harry Tyson-Wilson	Scrum-half	N/A	Hull FC Academy	0	0	0	0	0
30	Danny Washbrook	Loose forward	N/A	Wakefield Trinity Wildcats	8	0	0	0	0
31	Callum Lancaster	Wing	N/A	Hull FC Academy	1	0	0	0	0
32	Reece Dean	Centre	N/A	Hull FC Academy	0	0	0	0	0
33	Masimbaashe Motongo	Prop	N/A	Hull FC Academy	0	0	0	0	0
34	Richard Whiting	Second-row	N/A	Featherstone Rovers	0	0	0	0	0

= Injured = Suspended

== 2016 transfers in/out ==
In

Player	Signed from	Contract length	Date
(New Zealand) Frank Pritchard	Canterbury Bulldogs	2 Years	June 2015
(England) Scott Taylor	Wigan Warriors	3 Years	June 2015
(Samoa) Carlos Tuimavave	Newcastle Knights	3 Years	July 2015
(Tonga) Mahe Fonua	Melbourne Storm	3 Years	August 2015
(New Zealand) Sika Manu	Penrith Panthers	3 Years	August 2015
(England) Danny Washbrook	Wakefield Trinity Wildcats	2 Years	August

Out

Player	Signed for	Contract length	Date
(Tonga) Mickey Paea	Newcastle Knights	2 Years	May 2015
(England) Stuart Howarth	Wakefield Trinity Wildcats	1 ½ Years	June 2015
(England) Tom Lineham	Warrington Wolves	4 Years	June 2015
(England) James Cunningham	London Broncos	1 ½ Years	July 2015
(Samoa) Setaimata Sa	Widnes Vikings	1 Year	August 2015
(Australia) Jordan Rankin	Wests Tigers	2 Years	September 2015
(England) Joe Westerman	Warrington Wolves	3 Years	October 2015
