= Keinhorst =

Keinhorst is a German surname. Notable people with the surname include:

- Jimmy Keinhorst (born 1990), German rugby league player
- Kristian Keinhorst (fl. 2007–2015), German rugby league player
