= 2018 Castleford Tigers season =

- Super League Rank: 3rd
- Play-off result: Semi-final
- Challenge Cup: Sixth round
- 2018 record: Wins: 20; draws: 1; losses: 10
- Points scored: For: 785; against: 632

Team information
- Chairman: Ian Fulton
- Head Coach: Daryl Powell
- Captain: Michael Shenton
- Stadium: The Jungle (Wheldon Road)
- Avg. attendance: 7,604
- Agg. attendance: 114,061
- High attendance: 9,557
- Low attendance: 5,406

Top scorers
- Tries: Greg Eden (18)
- Goals: Jamie Ellis (57)
- Points: Jamie Ellis (123)
| ← 2017 | List of seasons | 2019 → |

The 2018 season was the Castleford Tigers' 93rd season in the Rugby Football League and their 11th consecutive season in the top flight of English rugby league. The club competed in the 2018 Super League and the 2018 Challenge Cup.

== Results ==
=== Super League ===
==== League table ====
| Pos | Team | Pld | W | D | L | PF | PA | PD | Pts | Qualification |
|---|---|---|---|---|---|---|---|---|---|---|
| 1 | St. Helens | 23 | 21 | 0 | 2 | 713 | 298 | +415 | 42 | Super League Super 8s |
| 2 | Wigan Warriors | 23 | 16 | 0 | 7 | 573 | 345 | +228 | 32 | Super League Super 8s |
| 3 | Castleford Tigers | 23 | 15 | 1 | 7 | 567 | 480 | +87 | 31 | Super League Super 8s |
| 4 | Warrington Wolves | 23 | 14 | 1 | 8 | 531 | 410 | +121 | 29 | Super League Super 8s |
| 5 | Huddersfield Giants | 23 | 11 | 1 | 11 | 427 | 629 | −202 | 23 | Super League Super 8s |
| 6 | Hull F.C. | 23 | 11 | 0 | 12 | 534 | 544 | −10 | 22 | Super League Super 8s |
| 7 | Wakefield Trinity | 23 | 10 | 1 | 12 | 581 | 506 | +75 | 21 | Super League Super 8s |
| 8 | Catalans Dragons | 23 | 10 | 1 | 12 | 488 | 531 | −43 | 21 | Super League Super 8s |
| 9 | Leeds Rhinos | 23 | 8 | 2 | 13 | 441 | 527 | −86 | 18 | The Qualifiers |
| 10 | Hull KR | 23 | 8 | 1 | 14 | 476 | 582 | −106 | 17 | The Qualifiers |
| 11 | Salford Red Devils | 23 | 7 | 0 | 16 | 384 | 597 | −213 | 14 | The Qualifiers |
| 12 | Widnes Vikings | 23 | 3 | 0 | 20 | 387 | 653 | −266 | 6 | The Qualifiers |

Source: Rugby League Project

==== Super League results ====
W Win D Draw L Loss

Super League results
| Date | Round | Versus | H/A | Venue | Result | Score | Tries | Goals | Attendance | Report |
|---|---|---|---|---|---|---|---|---|---|---|
| 2 February | 1 | St Helens | A | Totally Wicked Stadium | L | 4–46 | | | 13,108 | RLP |
| 11 February | 2 | Widnes Vikings | H | Mend-A-Hose Jungle | W | 13–12 | | | 7,106 | RLP |
| 24 February | 3 | Hull F.C. | H | Mend-A-Hose Jungle | W | 28–18 | | | 9,365 | RLP |
| 11 March | 5 | Salford Red Devils | H | Mend-A-Hose Jungle | W | 22–8 | | | 7,480 | RLP |
| 23 March | 7 | Leeds Rhinos | A | Elland Road | W | 25–24 | | | 23,246 | RLP |
| 29 March | 8 | Wakefield Trinity | A | Mobile Rocket Stadium | W | 11–6 | | | 7,020 | RLP |
| 2 April | 9 | Warrington Wolves | H | Mend-A-Hose Jungle | L | 6–18 | | | 6,881 | RLP |
| 8 April | 10 | Huddersfield Giants | A | John Smiths Stadium | W | 40–28 | | | 5,945 | RLP |
| 15 April | 11 | Catalans Dragons | H | Mend-A-Hose Jungle | W | 41–0 | | | 7,137 | RLP |
| 20 April | 12 | Wigan Warriors | A | DW Stadium | L | 12–28 | | | 11,866 | RLP |
| 27 April | 13 | Wakefield Trinity | H | Mend-A-Hose Jungle | W | 24–4 | | | 7,485 | RLP |
| 5 May | 14 | Hull F.C. | A | KCOM Stadium | L | 12–36 | | | 13,623 | RLP |
| 19 May | 15 | Leeds Rhinos | N | St James' Park | W | 38–10 | | | 38,881 | RLP |
| 24 May | 16 | St Helens | H | Mend-A-Hose Jungle | L | 18–40 | | | 6,969 | RLP |
| 1 June | 4 | Hull Kingston Rovers | A | KCOM Craven Park | W | 42–14 | | | 7,074 | RLP |
| 8 June | 17 | Warrington Wolves | A | Halliwell Jones Stadium | W | 34–30 | | | 9,198 | RLP |
| 17 June | 18 | Hull Kingston Rovers | H | Mend-A-Hose Jungle | D | 24–24 | | | 9,022 | RLP |
| 22 June | 6 | Wigan Warriors | H | Mend-A-Hose Jungle | W | 19–18 | | | 7,714 | RLP |
| 30 June | 19 | Catalans Dragons | A | Stade Gilbert Brutus | L | 16–44 | | | 10,236 | RLP |
| 8 July | 20 | Leeds Rhinos | H | Mend-A-Hose Jungle | W | 42–10 | | | 9,557 | RLP |
| 13 July | 21 | Salford Red Devils | A | AJ Bell Stadium | W | 24–6 | | | 2,681 | RLP |
| 20 July | 22 | Huddersfield Giants | H | Mend-A-Hose Jungle | L | 18–32 | | | 5,406 | RLP |
| 29 July | 23 | Widnes Vikings | A | Halton Stadium | W | 54–24 | | | 4,218 | RLP |

=== Super 8s ===
==== Super 8s table ====
| Pos | Team | Pld | W | D | L | PF | PA | PD | Pts | Qualification |
|---|---|---|---|---|---|---|---|---|---|---|
| 1 | St. Helens (L) | 30 | 26 | 0 | 4 | 895 | 408 | +487 | 52 | Semi-finals |
| 2 | Wigan Warriors (C) | 30 | 23 | 0 | 7 | 740 | 417 | +323 | 46 | Semi-finals |
| 3 | Castleford Tigers | 30 | 20 | 1 | 9 | 767 | 582 | +185 | 41 | Semi-finals |
| 4 | Warrington Wolves | 30 | 18 | 1 | 11 | 767 | 561 | +206 | 37 | Semi-finals |
| 5 | Wakefield Trinity | 30 | 13 | 1 | 16 | 747 | 696 | +51 | 27 | |
| 6 | Huddersfield Giants | 30 | 13 | 1 | 16 | 539 | 794 | −255 | 27 | |
| 7 | Catalans Dragons | 30 | 12 | 1 | 17 | 596 | 750 | −154 | 25 | |
| 8 | Hull F.C. | 30 | 11 | 0 | 19 | 615 | 787 | −172 | 22 | |

Source: Rugby League Project
(C) Champions; (L) League Leaders' Shield Winners

==== Super 8s results ====
Super 8s results
| Date | Round | Versus | H/A | Venue | Result | Score | Tries | Goals | Attendance | Report |
|---|---|---|---|---|---|---|---|---|---|---|
| 10 August | S1 | Wigan Warriors | A | DW Stadium | L | 22–24 | | | 10,293 | RLP |
| 17 August | S2 | Warrington Wolves | H | Mend-A-Hose Jungle | L | 28–18 | | | 7,142 | RLP |
| 1 September | S3 | Catalans Dragons | H | Mend-A-Hose Jungle | W | 36–4 | | | 7,658 | RLP |
| 7 September | S4 | Hull F.C. | A | KCOM Stadium | W | 28–6 | | | 10,570 | RLP |
| 13 September | S5 | Huddersfield Giants | H | Mend-A-Hose Jungle | L | 44–12 | | | 7,279 | RLP |
| 21 September | S6 | Wakefield Trinity | H | Mend-A-Hose Jungle | W | 42–10 | | | 7,860 | RLP |
| 28 September | S7 | St Helens | A | Totally Wicked Stadium | L | 0–26 | | | 9,813 | RLP |

==== Play-off results ====
Play-off results
| Date | Round | Versus | H/A | Venue | Result | Score | Tries | Goals | Attendance | Report |
|---|---|---|---|---|---|---|---|---|---|---|
| 5 October | Semi-finals | Wigan Warriors | A | DW Stadium | L | 0–14 | | | 13,461 | RLP |

=== Challenge Cup ===
W Win L Loss

Challenge Cup results
| Date | Round | Versus | H/A | Venue | Result | Score | Tries | Goals | Attendance | Report |
|---|---|---|---|---|---|---|---|---|---|---|
| 12 May | 6 | St Helens | H | Mend-A-Hose Jungle | L | 18–36 | | | 5,342 | RLP |
