= Brian Smith (rugby league, born 1954) =

Australian professional RL coach and former rugby league footballer

Personal information
- Full name: Brian Theo Smith
- Born: 14 March 1954 (age 72) Maclean, New South Wales, Australia

Playing information
- Height: 172 cm (5 ft 8 in)
- Weight: 76 kg (12 st 0 lb)
- Position: Halfback
Club
Years	Team	Pld	T	G	FG	P
1974	St. George Dragons	14	1	0	1	4
1975–79	South Sydney	17	0	0	0	0
	Total	31	1	0	1	4

Coaching information
Club
Years	Team	Gms	W	D	L	W%
1984–87	Illawarra Steelers	96	32	0	64	33
1988–90	Hull F.C.	50	32	0	18	64
1991–95	St. George Dragons	118	69	3	46	58
1995–96	Bradford Bulls	28	21	0	7	75
1997–06	Parramatta Eels	243	138	7	99	57
2007–09	Newcastle Knights	48	21	0	27	44
2010–12	Sydney Roosters	76	35	1	40	46
2015–16	Wakefield Trinity	20	6	0	14	30
	Total	679	354	11	315	52
Representative
Years	Team	Gms	W	D	L	W%
2001–03	NSW Country	3	1	0	2	33
2013	United States	0	0	0	0
2017	Thailand	1	0	0	1	0
- Relatives: Tony Smith (brother); Rohan Smith (son)

Brian Smith (born 14 March 1954) is an Australian rugby league coach and former player. He was also the Football Manager for the New Zealand Warriors.

Smith played for St. George from 1973 to 1974 and for South Sydney in 1975, 1976 and 1979, appearing in a total of 31 first grade games. However, Smith is best known as a coach, having been at the helm of Illawarra, where he took over for the 1984 season, before moving to Hull, St. George, Bradford, Parramatta, Newcastle and, most recently, the Sydney Roosters and the NSW Country side. Although Smith had a successful career in Australia, he fell short of becoming a premiership winning coach, being on the losing end of all four grand finals he coached in (1992 and 1993 with St George, 2001 with Parramatta and 2010 with Eastern Suburbs.)

== Playing career ==
In the New South Wales Rugby Football League premiership, Smith played 14 first grade games for St. George in 1974, and 17 games for the South Sydney between 1975 and 1979, appearing in a total of 31 first grade games.

== Coaching career ==
=== Newtown ===
Smith began coaching in 1978, coaching the Newtown under 23s team. He then joined South Sydney in 1980, also as under-23's coach. He stayed there until the end of 1982 coaching the reserve grade team in that season.

=== Illawarra Steelers ===
Smith began coaching first grade rugby league in the NSWRL competition in 1984, where he became coach of the Illawarra Steelers, where he remained until the end of 1987 season. Illawarra would struggle on the field during the early days earning Wooden Spoons under Smith's tenure in 1985 and 1986. While coaching Illawarra in 1986, Smith proposed using two referees. This did eventuate in 2009.

=== Hull F.C. ===
From 1988 until 1990, Smith was coach of Hull F.C. in England's Championship., In season 1988-89 Hull progressed to the Premiership Final at Old Trafford ultimately losing to Widnes. Hull led the competition when Smith left in January 1991 and went on to win the Premiership Final in May.

=== St. George ===
Smith returned to Australia to coach St. George for the 1991 season. He took the club to consecutive Grand Finals in 1992 (in which his younger brother Tony played from the Dragons' interchange bench) and 1993, losing both to Wayne Bennett's Brisbane Broncos. Smith would remain at St George until 1995.

=== Bradford Bulls ===
Smith returned to England for two seasons 1995 and 1996 to coach the Bradford Bulls to the 1996 Challenge Cup Final at Wembley Stadium, London in front of 78,550 fans. For Smith it would be another final loss as Bradford went down to St. Helens 32–40. Bradford led the match 26-12 with just over twenty minutes left to play. Bradford would go on to win major trophies across the next decade including Challenge Cups, Grand Final Premierships and World Club Challenge Finals.

=== Parramatta Eels ===
Returning to Australia, from 1997 until mid-2006, Smith coached the Parramatta Eels. In his first season at Parramatta, he guided the club to their first finals series in eleven years. This was followed by three consecutive preliminary final appearances in 1998, 1999 and 2000 with the 1998 preliminary final being the most notable. With less than ten minutes to play, Parramatta lead Canterbury 18-2 until Canterbury staged one of the biggest comebacks in finals history to win the match 32-20 in extra-time.

Smith took Parramatta to the 2001 NRL Grand Final in what was the Eels first Grand Final since their 4–2 win over Canterbury-Bankstown in 1986. The club had set numerous records throughout the season as they claimed the Minor Premiership. As of the 2024 NRL season, some of these records still stand. Facing Parramatta would be the Andrew Johns led Newcastle Knights. Parramatta were raging hot favourites to win the 2001 NRL grand final but four converted and unanswered tries to Newcastle in the first 24 minutes of the game was too big a lead for Parramatta to overcome. Newcastle would go on to hand Smith his third Grand Final loss with a 30–24 win in front of 90,414 at Stadium Australia.

In the 2005 NRL season, Smith would guide Parramatta to another Minor Premiership and were favourites to take out the premiership that season. However, the club would suffer a shock 29-0 loss against North Queensland in the preliminary final.

Smith became the longest-serving coach for the Parramatta Eels before he resigned as coach on 15 May 2006, with assistant coach Jason Taylor taking over as caretaker coach for the remainder of the season. During this period, Parramatta made seven appearances in the playoffs.

=== Bradford Bulls (return) ===
Smith had a short spell with his former club Bradford in an advisory role during the summer of 2006.

=== Newcastle Knights ===
In 2007, Smith took up coaching duties with the Newcastle Knights. In July 2009, he signed a deal for 2010 with the Sydney Roosters and obtained a release from the Knights. On 15 August 2009, Smith effectively quit the Newcastle club, with understudy Rick Stone to act as caretaker coach for the remainder of the season.

=== Sydney Roosters ===
For the 2010 NRL season Smith took over as Sydney Roosters coach from Brad Fittler who had been sacked the previous year. At the 2010 Dally M Awards Smith was named coach of the year. The Roosters reached the 2010 NRL Grand Final but were defeated by Wayne Bennett's St. George Illawarra Dragons. The Sydney Roosters almost became the second club in NSWRL/NRL history to go from finishing with a wooden spoon to winning the premiership in the following year.

Smith was sacked by the club with a year still remaining on his contract at the end of the 2012 NRL season, after the Roosters finished in 13th place with an 8–15–1 record. A year after his Sacking, the Roosters won the 2013 premiership

=== England ===
Smith also worked as an assistant coach for Steve McNamara for the English team in their 2010 Four Nations campaign.

=== United States ===
In 2013, he was briefly the head coach of the USA.

=== Wakefield Trinity ===
On 31 May 2015, Wakefield Trinity Wildcats announced on Sky Sports coverage of the Magic Weekend ahead of their game versus Castleford Tigers that Smith had agreed to take up the position of head coach. Former coach James Webster put Smith in touch with the club via text message. He resigned from Wakefield on 8 March 2016.

=== Serbia ===
In 2015, Smith became a consultant at the Serbian Rugby League and assisted the Serbian national team in their 2016 Qualifiers in a bid to qualify for their first ever Rugby League World Cup.

=== Thailand ===
On 8 February 2017, he coached a Thailand team in a 10–44 defeat to Hungary staged at Endeavour Sports High School, Sydney.

=== Statistics ===
Brian Smith – coaching results by season
Team	Year	Games	Wins	Draws	Losses	Win %	Finals
ILL	1984	24	12	0	12	50%	Finished 8th (out of 13)
ILL	1985	24	5	0	19	21%	Finished 13th (out of 13)
ILL	1986	24	7	0	17	29%	Finished 13th (out of 13)
ILL	1987	24	8	0	16	33%	Finished 11th (out of 13)
ILL		96	32	0	64	33%	
StG	1991	22	11	3	8	57%	Finished 9th (out of 16)
StG	1992	26	17	0	9	65%	Lost 1992 NSWRL Grand Final against Brisbane Broncos 8—28
StG	1993	25	19	0	6	76%	Lost 1993 NSWRL Grand Final against Brisbane Broncos 6—14
StG	1994	22	9	0	13	41%	Finished 11th (out of 16)
StG	1995	23	13	0	10	57%	Lost 1995 ARL Elimination Final against Canterbury-Bankstown Bulldogs 8—12
StG		118	69	3	46	60%	
PAR	1997	24	14	1	9	60%	Lost 1997 ARL Minor Semi Final against North Sydney Bears 14—24
PAR	1998	27	19	1	7	72%	Lost 1998 NRL Preliminary Final against Canterbury-Bankstown Bulldogs 20—32
PAR	1999	26	18	0	8	69%	Lost 1999 NRL Preliminary Final against Melbourne Storm 18—26
PAR	2000	29	16	1	12	57%	Lost 2000 NRL Preliminary Final against Brisbane Broncos 10—16
PAR	2001	29	22	2	5	79%	Lost 2001 NRL Grand Final against Newcastle Knights 24—30
PAR	2002	25	10	2	13	44%	Lost 2002 NRL Qualifying Final against Brisbane Broncos 14—24
PAR	2003	24	11	0	13	46%	Finished 9th (out of 15)
PAR	2004	24	9	0	15	38%	Finished 12th (out of 15)
PAR	2005	26	17	0	9	65%	Lost 2005 NRL Preliminary Final against North Queensland Cowboys 0—29
PAR	2006	25	12	0	13	48%	Lost 2006 NRL Qualifying Final against Melbourne Storm 6—12
PAR		259	148	7	104	58%	
NEW	2007	24	9	0	15	38%	Finished 15th (out of 16)
NEW	2008	24	12	0	12	50%	Finished 9th (out of 16)
NEW	2009	20	10	0	10	50%	Released From Contract
NEW		68	31	0	37	46%	
SYD	2010	28	17	0	11	61%	Lost 2010 NRL Grand Final against St. George Illawarra Dragons 8—32
SYD	2011	24	10	0	14	42%	Finished 11th (out of 16)
SYD	2012	24	8	1	15	35%	Finished 13th (out of 16)
SYD		76	35	1	40	47%	
Career		617	315	11	291	52%	

== Personal life ==
Smith is the older brother of former Great Britain coach Tony Smith and is father of Keegan Smith, the strength and power coach at the Roosters, and Rohan Smith, the former head coach of Leeds Rhinos and a former coach of Tonga and assistant coach at Auckland Warriors, London Broncos, Newcastle Knights, Sydney Roosters and Gold Coast Titans.
