= Rohan Smith (rugby league) =

Australian professional RL coach

Personal information
- Born: 6 May 1981 (age 45)
- Height: 5 ft 11 in (1.80 m)
- Weight: 14 st 0 lb (89 kg)

Coaching information
Club
Years	Team	Gms	W	D	L	W%
2016–17	Bradford Bulls	20	14	0	6	70
2018–22	Norths Devils	72	48	0	24	67
2022–24	Leeds Rhinos	61	31	0	30	51
2025–	Norths Devils	23	17	0	6	74
	Total	176	110	0	66	63
Representative
Years	Team	Gms	W	D	L	W%
2009	Tonga	3	0	0	3	0
- Source: As of 10 Oct 2024
- Father: Brian Smith
- Relatives: Tony Smith (uncle)

Rohan Smith (born 6 May 1981) is an Australian rugby league coach who is the head coach of the Norths Devils and a former head coach of Tonga, the Bradford Bulls and the Norths Devils.

== Background ==
Smith was born in Australia and his the son of former Australian player and coach Brian Smith and nephew of Tony Smith.

After his father was appointed head coach of the Bradford Bulls in 1995 he moved to England as a teenager and played amateur rugby league for Stanningley ARFLC alongside future Leeds Rhinos player Jamie Jones Buchanan.

== Career ==
Despite playing amateur rugby as a teenager, Smith never played professionally. His first entry to coaching was as Daniel Anderson's video analyst at the New Zealand Warriors when he was 21.

In 2006, Smith returned to England to take up his first coaching role as assistant to Tony Rea at the London Broncos. After two seasons with London Smith returned to Australia to assist his father at the Sydney Roosters and the Newcastle Knights in the NRL.

=== Tonga ===
Smith was appointed head coach of Tonga for three games in 2009 before returning to coaching roles in the NRL at Penrith Panthers and Gold Coast Titans.

=== Bradford Bulls ===
His first head coach role came in 2016 when he was appointed head coach of Bradford Bulls in the Championship Initially on a three-year deal, Smith's tenure was terminated in January 2017 as Bradford went into liquidation.

=== Norths Devils ===
Following Bradford liquidation, Smith returned to Australia in 2018 to become the head coach of the Norths Devils in the Queensland Cup.

=== Leeds Rhinos ===
In April 2022 Smith left the Devils to once more return to England to follow in his uncle Tony's footsteps and coach the Leeds Rhinos Upon Smith's arrival to Leeds, the club went from 11th on the table to 5th which qualified the club for the playoffs. Under Smith, the club won 13 of the 18 matches including upset victories over Catalans and Wigan in the playoffs. On 24 September 2022, Smith coached Leeds in their 24-12 loss to St Helens RFC in the 2022 Super League Grand Final. In the 2023 Super League season, Smith could not replicate what he did in the previous season with Leeds as the club finished 8th on the table and missed the playoffs. On 19 June 2024 it was reported that he would leave Leeds by mutual consent with immediate effect.

=== Norths Devils ===
On 10 Oct 2024 it was reported that he had returned to the role of head coach at Norths Devils who play in the Queensland Cup
