= George Lawler =

English rugby league footballer

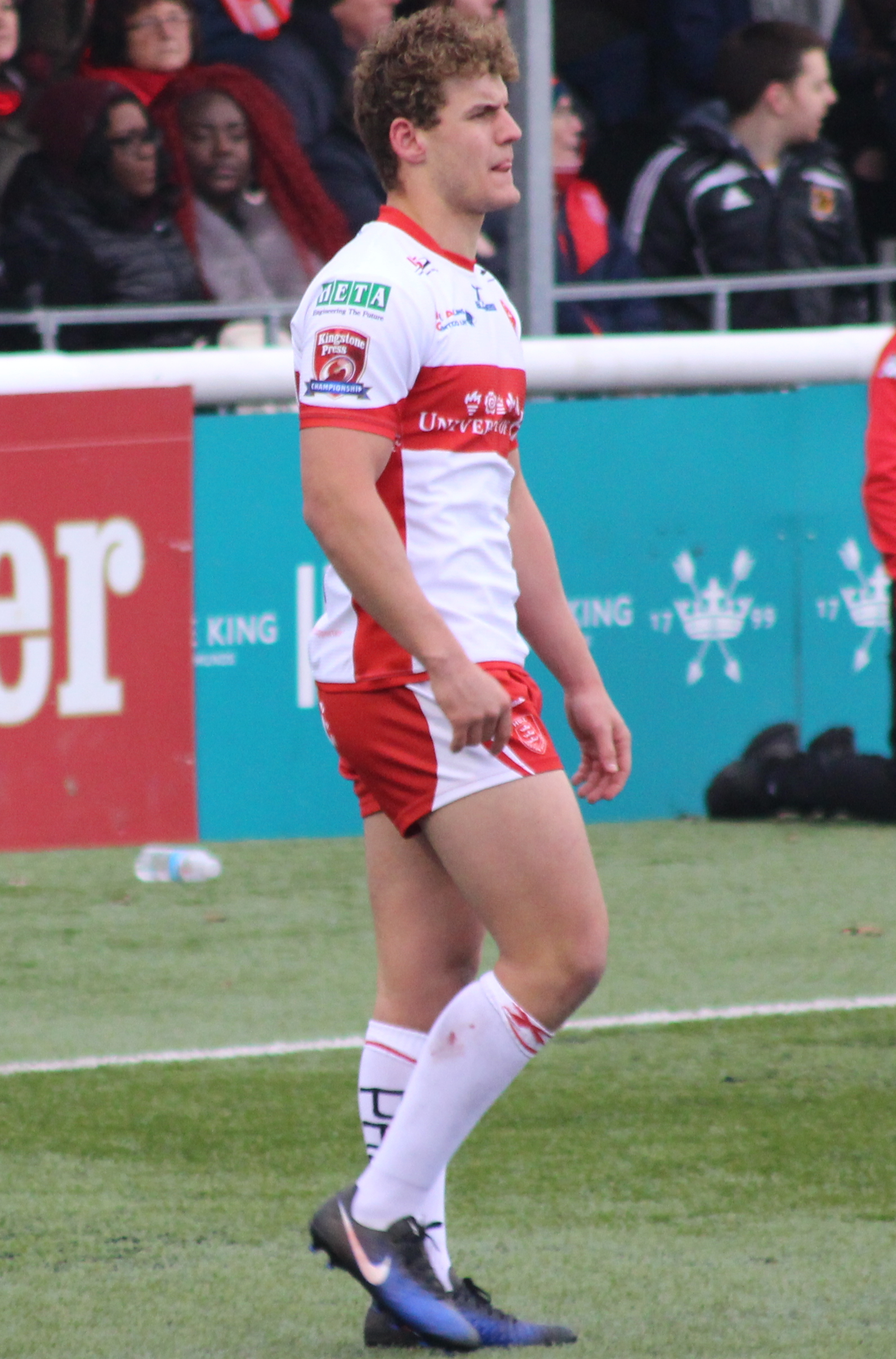

Personal information
- Born: 1 September 1995 (age 31) Kingston upon Hull, Humberside, England
- Height: 6 ft 0 in (1.83 m)
- Weight: 15 st 13 lb (101 kg)

Playing information
- Position: Prop, Second-row, Loose forward, Hooker
Club
Years	Team	Pld	T	G	FG	P
2015–21	Hull Kingston Rovers	103	12	0	0	48
2016(DR)	→ Newcastle Thunder	1	1	0	0	4
2017(DR)	→ York City Knights	1	0	0	0	0
2022–	Castleford Tigers	113	12	0	0	48
	Total	218	25	0	0	100
Representative
Years	Team	Pld	T	G	FG	P
2021	England Knights	1	0	0	0	0
- Source: As of 12 September 2026

George Lawler (born 1 September 1995) is an English professional rugby league footballer who plays as a prop, second-row, loose forward or hooker for the Castleford Tigers in the Super League.

He has previously played for Hull Kingston Rovers in the Super League, and has spent time on dual registration from Hull KR at Newcastle Thunder and York City Knights in League 1.

== Background ==
Lawler was born in Kingston upon Hull, East Yorkshire, England.

== Playing career ==
=== Hull Kingston Rovers ===
Lawler is a former West Hull amateur, George was a product of and another player that blossomed through the ranks of the City of Hull Academy, before he started spending more time with the Hull Kingston Rovers' first-team squad.

On 23 August, 2015, he made a try scoring début for Hull Kingston Rovers against the Widnes Vikings in an 8–12 victory in The Qualifiers.

It was revealed on 2 March 2016, that Lawler had signed a four-year contract at Hull Kingston Rovers following an impressive start to his professional playing career.

Lawler suffered relegation from the Super League with Hull Kingston Rovers in the 2016 season, due to losing the Million Pound Game at the hands of the Salford Red Devils in golden point extra time.

12-months later, however, Lawler was part of a Hull Kingston Rovers side that won promotion back to the Super League, at the first time of asking following relegation the season prior.

It was announced on 4 May 2018, that Lawler had penned a new three-year contract extension, to remain at Hull Kingston Rovers until at least the end of the 2021 season.

=== Castleford Tigers ===
On 5 October 2021, it was announced that Lawler had signed for the Castleford Tigers on a two-year deal. For the 2022 season, he claimed squad number 10 which was vacated by the retiring Grant Millington. Lawler made his Castleford debut on 11 February 2022 in the opening round fixture against the Salford Red Devils. He scored his first try for the club on 26 March against the Leeds Rhinos in the Challenge Cup. During his first season he made twenty-three appearances, featuring predominantly as a prop or second-row forward, but also filling in at hooker.

Lawler scored his second Tigers try against Huddersfield on 10 March 2023. In June, he sustained a quad injury which kept him out for seven weeks. He played twenty matches in total for Castleford in the 2023 season as the club narrowly avoided relegation by finishing above Wakefield. In October, he signed a two-year contract extension with Cas.

On 3 April 2024, Lawler was hospitalised following a seizure at his home during the night. Initial scans indicated a small bleed on the brain and he remained in hospital for further testing and specialist involvement, with former teammate Jamie Peacock writing, "everyone in the rugby league world will be wishing him the best in his recovery." After three months of recovery and phased return to training, Lawler returned to the team for Castleford's victory against St Helens on 5 July, and was named in the Love Rugby League team of the week. In September, Castleford confirmed that neurological reviews had verified there was no brain injury suffered, and Lawler finished the season having made fifteen appearances.

Lawler was appointed Castleford vice-captain ahead of the 2025 season. He scored two tries in round 13 against Warrington Wolves and was named in the team of the week. In July, he scored a try in three consecutive rounds, against Huddersfield, Salford and Warrington, and was selected in the round 19 team of the week. On 23 July, he signed a new three-year deal with the club; director of rugby Chris Chester said, "George is a very influential player in the squad and consistently performs well. He's a player that leads with his actions on the field and is equally impressive off it." He was ever-present throughout the year, featuring in all twenty-eight matches for Castleford as the club finished 11th in the Super League.

In the first months of the 2026 season, Lawler scored tries in Castleford's opening-round loss to Wigan, and in their wins against Huddersfield, Bradford and Wigan. In round 9, he was sin-binned for a high tackle on Hull's Ligi Sao and received a two-match suspension. In round 13, Lawler made his 100th Castleford appearance and marked the occasion with a try. He missed one game in July through a groin injury. His performance in the round 23 victory against Hull earned a place in the Team of the Week, and he finished the year having made twenty-seven appearances and scored five tries.

== Club statistics ==
Appearances and points in all competitions by year
Club	Season	Tier	App	T	G	DG	Pts
Hull Kingston Rovers	2015	Super League	3	2	0	0	8
Hull Kingston Rovers	2016	Super League	21	2	0	0	8
Hull Kingston Rovers	2017	Championship	17	4	0	0	16
Hull Kingston Rovers	2018	Super League	3	1	0	0	4
Hull Kingston Rovers	2019	Super League	26	1	0	0	4
Hull Kingston Rovers	2020	Super League	15	0	0	0	0
Hull Kingston Rovers	2021	Super League	18	2	0	0	8
Hull Kingston Rovers	Total		103	12	0	0	48
→ Newcastle Thunder (DR)	2016	League 1	1	1	0	0	4
→ York City Knights (DR)	2017	League 1	1	0	0	0	0
Castleford Tigers	2022	Super League	23	1	0	0	4
Castleford Tigers	2023	Super League	20	1	0	0	4
Castleford Tigers	2024	Super League	15	0	0	0	0
Castleford Tigers	2025	Super League	28	5	0	0	20
Castleford Tigers	2026	Super League	27	5	0	0	20
Castleford Tigers	Total		113	12	0	0	48
Career total			218	25	0	0	100

As of match played 12 September 2026
