= Harry Tyson-Wilson =

English rugby league footballer

Personal information
- Born: 29 December 1996 (age 28); Kingston upon Hull, East Riding of Yorkshire, England

Playing information
- Position: Scrum-half
Club
| Years | Team | Pld | T | G | FG | P |
|---|---|---|---|---|---|---|
| 2014–16 | Hull FC | 1 | 0 | 0 | 0 | 0 |
| 2016(loan) | → Doncaster | 2 | 0 | 0 | 0 | 0 |
| 2016(loan) | → York City Knights | 3 | 4 | 14 | 0 | 44 |
| 2017–18 | York City Knights | 15 | 3 | 30 | 0 | 72 |
| 2018–20 | Hunslet | 1 | 0 | 0 | 0 | 0 |
| 2021–22 | Sheffield Eagles | 7 | 0 | 1 | 1 | 3 |
| | Total | 29 | 7 | 45 | 1 | 119 |
- Source: As of 21 December 2023

Harry Tyson-Wilson (born 29 December 1996) is an English professional rugby league footballer who most recently played for Sheffield Eagles in the Championship. He plays as a scrum-half.

Tyson-Wilson has played for Hull FC, Doncaster (loan), York City Knights (two spells, one as a loan), and for Hunslet in League 1, as a scrum-half.

Tyson-Wilson is currently serving a 3-year playing ban due to end in April 2026 for an anti-doping rule violation.

== Background ==
Tyson-Wilsonis the brother of prop Bobby Tyson-Wilson, who also plays for Sheffield Eagles and George Tyson-Wilson who is a Royal Marine Commando. Son of ex Hull FC, Hull KR, Hunslet Hawks and Doncaster Dragons player Rob Wilson who is currently a coach with the Hull KR youth set up.

== Career ==
Tyson-Wilson made his Hull F.C. début on 7 September 2014 off the interchange bench in a Super League match against Huddersfield. In December 2016, he signed a one-year contract with League 1 side York City Knights having previously played for them on loan earlier in the year. In October 2017 he signed a one-year contract with Hunslet.

On 14 October 2020, it was announced that he had signed for Sheffield Eagles After two seasons at Sheffield Tyson-Wilson left the club in 2022. It was announced in September 2022 that he had joined Dewsbury Rams for 2023 but in November the club announced that he had left, wishing to play more locally to home in Hull.

In December 2023, Tyson-Wilson was issued with a three year ban, backdated to April 2023, for anti-doping rule violations in relation to the purchase of dianabol in March 2019. UK Anti-Doping (UKAD) had launched an investigation in 2022 after the police had notified them of the production and supply of prohibited substances during which Tyson-Wilson was identified as a purchaser.
