= Kristian Keinhorst =

Germany international rugby league footballer

Personal information
- Born: Yorkshire, England

Playing information
- Position: Halfback
Representative
Years	Team	Pld	T	G	FG	P
2007–15	Germany	17	6	45	1	115
- Relatives: Jimmy Keinhorst (brother)

Kristian Keinhorst is a German former rugby league footballer who played for the German national team. He played as a halfback.

== Career ==
He has made the most appearances of any German player (15). He is the brother of former Leeds Rhinos player, Jimmy Keinhorst and has two other brothers Nick and Markus. Together they set the world record for the most siblings to play in an international match (4).

In 2015 he played his last international match, against Spain.
