= Jack Downs =

English rugby league footballer

Personal information
- Born: 10 November 1995 (age 30) Hull, East Riding of Yorkshire, England
- Height: 5 ft 0 in (1.52 m)
- Weight: 19 st 7 lb (124 kg)

Playing information
- Position: Second-row, Centre
Club
Years	Team	Pld	T	G	FG	P
2015–18	Hull F.C.	20	1	0	0	4
2017(loan)	→ Doncaster	4	2	0	0	8
2018(loan)	→ Doncaster	10	3	0	0	12
2019	Batley Bulldogs	23	4	0	0	16
	Total	57	10	0	0	40
- Source: As of 3 January 2021

Jack Downs (born 10 November 1995) is an English professional rugby league footballer who last played as a second-row forward for the Batley Bulldogs in the Championship.

He has previously played for Hull F.C. in the Super League, and spent time on loan from Hull at Doncaster in League 1.

== Background ==
Jack was born in Kingston upon Hull, East Riding of Yorkshire, England.

Downs played for local club Cottingham Tigers A.R.L.F.C., when he was younger, before joining Hull FC.

Downs is believed to be the older brother of Jordan Abdull, also a professional rugby player.

Downs is a keen line dancer and once won a competition in this area of dance at Butlins, Skegness in 2013.

== Career ==
Downs made his début for hometown club Hull F.C. on 14 August 2015 in a Super League match against St. Helens at Langtree Park.

=== Batley Bulldogs ===
On 14 November 2019 it was announced that he had left the club with immediate effect due to weight issues.
