= Jordan Abdull =

England international rugby league footballer

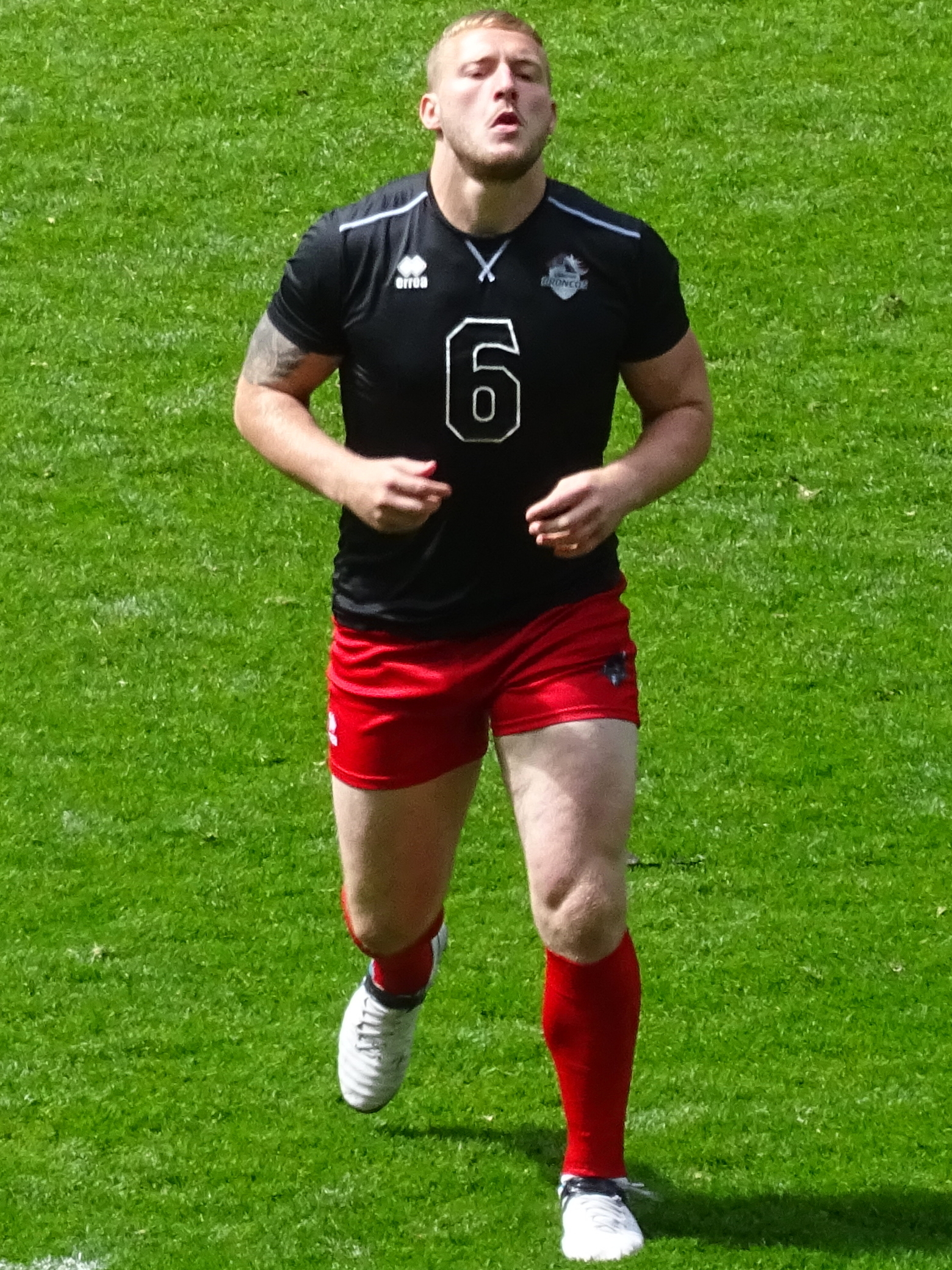

Personal information
- Born: 5 February 1996 (age 30) Kingston upon Hull, Humberside, England
- Height: 5 ft 11 in (1.80 m)
- Weight: 15 st 13 lb (101 kg)

Playing information
- Position: Stand-off, Scrum-half, Loose forward
Club
Years	Team	Pld	T	G	FG	P
2014–18	Hull FC	54	10	7	0	54
2016 (loan)	→ Doncaster RLFC	2	0	0	0	0
2016 (loan)	→ Featherstone Rovers	5	0	0	0	0
2017 (loan)	→ Hull Kingston Rovers	23	12	0	0	48
2019	London Broncos	28	10	1	0	42
2020–24	Hull Kingston Rovers	55	11	60	2	158
2024(loan)	→ Catalans Dragons	16	3	12	0	48
2026	Widnes Vikings	9	0	31	0	62
2026(loan)	→ Sheffield Eagles	1	1	1	0	6
2026–	Sheffield Eagles	3	0	6	0	12
	Total	196	47	118	2	430
Representative
Years	Team	Pld	T	G	FG	P
2021	England	1	0	3	0	6
- Source: As of 17 July 2026

Jordan “Kebabdull” Abdull (born 5 February 1996) is an English rugby league footballer who plays as a stand-off or scrum-half for Sheffield Eagles in the RFL Championship.

He has played for Hull FC and Hull KR in the Super League, Widnes Vikings in the Championship and on loan at Doncaster in League 1, Featherstone Rovers and Hull KR in the Championship. Abdull has also played for the London Broncos in the top flight and played as a loose forward earlier in his career.

== Background ==
Abdull was born in Kingston upon Hull, East Yorkshire.

== Early life ==
Abdull began his rugby league career at amateur club the Norland Sharks A.R.L.F.C. (in Hessle, East Riding of Yorkshire, of the Yorkshire Men's League), before moving to Skirlaugh Bulls ARLFC, and at school level he reached three Carnegie Champion Schools National Cup finals whilst at Sirius Academy.

== Career ==
=== Hull FC ===
After signing for boyhood club Hull F.C., he made his first team début against the Wakefield Trinity Wildcats on 29 June 2014, in which he kicked his first career conversion. Later that season he signed a new two-year contract with the club. In the 2014 season, Abdull scored his first try for Hull F.C. against the Castleford Tigers in an 18–18 draw on 24 July. His form saw him gain a call-up to the England Academy side on 19 October 2014, alongside Hull U19s teammates Jansin Turgut and Callum Lancaster. He made 20 appearances in the 2015 season and scored a total of four tries. Abdull was given the number 13 shirt after Joe Westerman left Hull F.C. to join the Warrington Wolves.

=== Hull KR (loan) ===
He spent with 2017 season on loan with Hull Kingston Rovers in the Kingstone Press Championship.

=== London Broncos ===
Abdull joined the London Broncos for an undisclosed fee ahead of the 2019 Super League season.

=== Hull KR ===
In round 3 of the 2021 Super League season, he kicked the winning field goal as Hull Kingston Rovers beat Huddersfield 25–24. On 24 July 2021, Abdull scored two tries and kicked five goals in Hull KR's 32–30 defeat against Catalans Dragons. On 24 September 2021, the day after being shortlisted for the Super League Man of Steel award, Abdull scored a try, two conversions, a penalty, and a drop goal, being named the Man of the Match, in Hull KR's shock 19–0 away win against Warrington, to earn a place in the Super League Play-Off semi-final at Catalans Dragons. Abdull played a total of 13 games for Hull KR in the 2021 Super League season including the club's 28–10 semi-final loss against the Catalans Dragons. On 20 October 2021 Abdull was selected for his England debut against France. On 12 May 2022, Abdull was ruled out for the remainder of the 2022 Super League season with a ligament tear. After a good start to the 2023 Super League season, it was announced on 4 May 2023 that Abdull had been ruled out for an indefinite period after tearing his quad muscle. Abdull played 14 games for Hull Kingston Rovers in the 2023 Super League season as the club finished fourth on the table and qualified for the playoffs. He played in the clubs semi-final loss against Wigan.

=== Catalans Dragons (loan) ===
In January 2024, it was announced that Abdull would join Catalans Dragons on a season-long loan deal. In June 2024, Abdull signed a three-year deal to join Hull F.C. ahead of the 2025 Super League season.

=== Widnes Vikings ===
On 24 September 2025 it was reported that he had signed for Widnes Vikings in the RFL Championship on a 1-year deal.

=== Sheffield Eagles ===
On 17 April 2026 it was reported that he had signed for Sheffield Eagles in the RFL Championship on a 1 month loan

On 6 May 2026 it was reported that Sheffield Eagles had made the loan permanent and he had now joined on a 2½ year deal.
