= Charlie Cavanaugh =

English rugby league footballer

Personal information
- Full name: Charles Cavanaugh
- Born: 6 November 2001 (age 23); Hull, East Riding of Yorkshire, England
- Height: 5 ft 8 in (1.73 m)
- Weight: 12 st 6 lb (79 kg)

Playing information
- Position: Hooker
Club
Years	Team	Pld	T	G	FG	P
2022–	Hull Kingston Rovers	1	0	0	0	0
- Source: As of 8 September 2022

Charlie Cavanaugh (born 6 November 2001) is a rugby league footballer who plays as a hooker for Hull Kingston Rovers in the Super League.

In 2022 he made his Hull KR Super League début against the Wigan Warriors.
