= Harvey Livett =

English rugby league player

Harve Livett
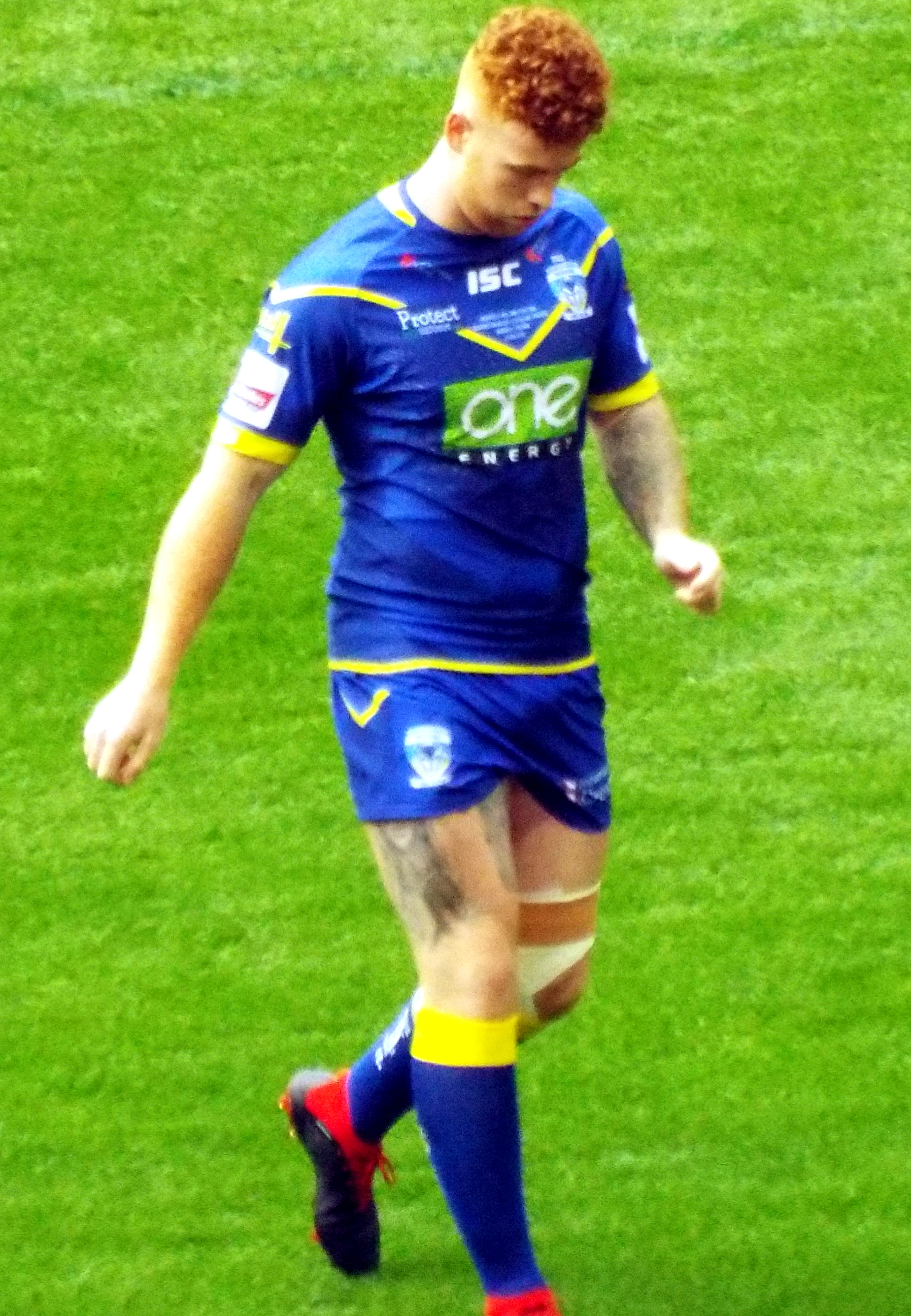

Personal information
- Full name: Harvey Livett
- Born: 4 January 1997 (age 29) Warrington, Cheshire, England
- Height: 6 ft 1 in (1.85 m)
- Weight: 15 st 4 lb (97 kg)

Playing information
- Position: Second-row, Centre
Club
Years	Team	Pld	T	G	FG	P
2017–20	Warrington Wolves	47	17	39	0	146
2017(loan)	→ Rochdale Hornets	1	1	6	0	16
2018(loan)	→ Rochdale Hornets	4	1	9	0	22
2019(loan)	→ Rochdale Hornets	2	1	0	0	4
2019(loan)	→ Hull Kingston Rovers	4	1	0	0	4
2020(loan)	→ Hull Kingston Rovers	11	2	0	0	0
2021–22	Salford Red Devils	27	9	13	0	62
2023–2024	Huddersfield Giants	17	3	0	0	12
	Total	113	35	67	0	266
Representative
Years	Team	Pld	T	G	FG	P
2018–	England Knights	1	0	0	0	0
- Source: As of 2 April 2022

Harvey Livett (born 4 January 1997) is a professional rugby league footballer who last played as a second-row forward or centre for the Huddersfield Giants in the Super League, and the England Knights at international level.

He also played for the Warrington Wolves in the Super League, and spent time on loan from Warrington at the Rochdale Hornets in the Championship and Hull Kingston Rovers in the Super League.

== Background ==
He is the son of the rugby league centre who played in the 1990s and 2000s for Workington Town, and Woolston Rovers ARLFC; Peter Livett.

== Career ==
=== Warrington Wolves ===
In 2017, he made his Super League début for the Warrington club against the Catalans Dragons, having previously played in pre-season friendlies.

Livett made a short appearance during the 2017 World Club Series match against the Brisbane Broncos in which Warrington were victors 27–18. He then became an important part of the Warrington team during 2017, scoring two tries and converting 10 goals. In one match, he scored a try and kicked six goals in a 40–18 victory against St Helens. Livett played in the 2018 Challenge Cup Final defeat to the Catalans Dragons at Wembley Stadium. On 17 June 2019, Livett joined fellow Super League side Hull Kingston Rovers on a months loan.

=== Salford ===
On 11 December 2020 it was announced that Livett would join Salford on a two-year deal for the 2021 season.

=== Huddersfield Giants ===
On 12 October 2022, it was announced that Livett would join Huddersfield Giants on a three-year deal for the 2023 season. Livett only featured in eight matches for Huddersfield in the 2023 Super League season as the club finished ninth on the table and missed the playoffs. Livett was limited to only eight appearances with Huddersfield in the 2024 Super League season which saw the club finish 9th on the table..It was announced in December 2024 that Livett had left the Giants after playing 17 times.

== International career ==
In July 2018 he was selected in the England Knights Performance squad. Later that year he was selected for the England Knights on their tour of Papua New Guinea. He played against Papua New Guinea at the Oil Search National Football Stadium.
