= Will Maher =

English rugby league footballer

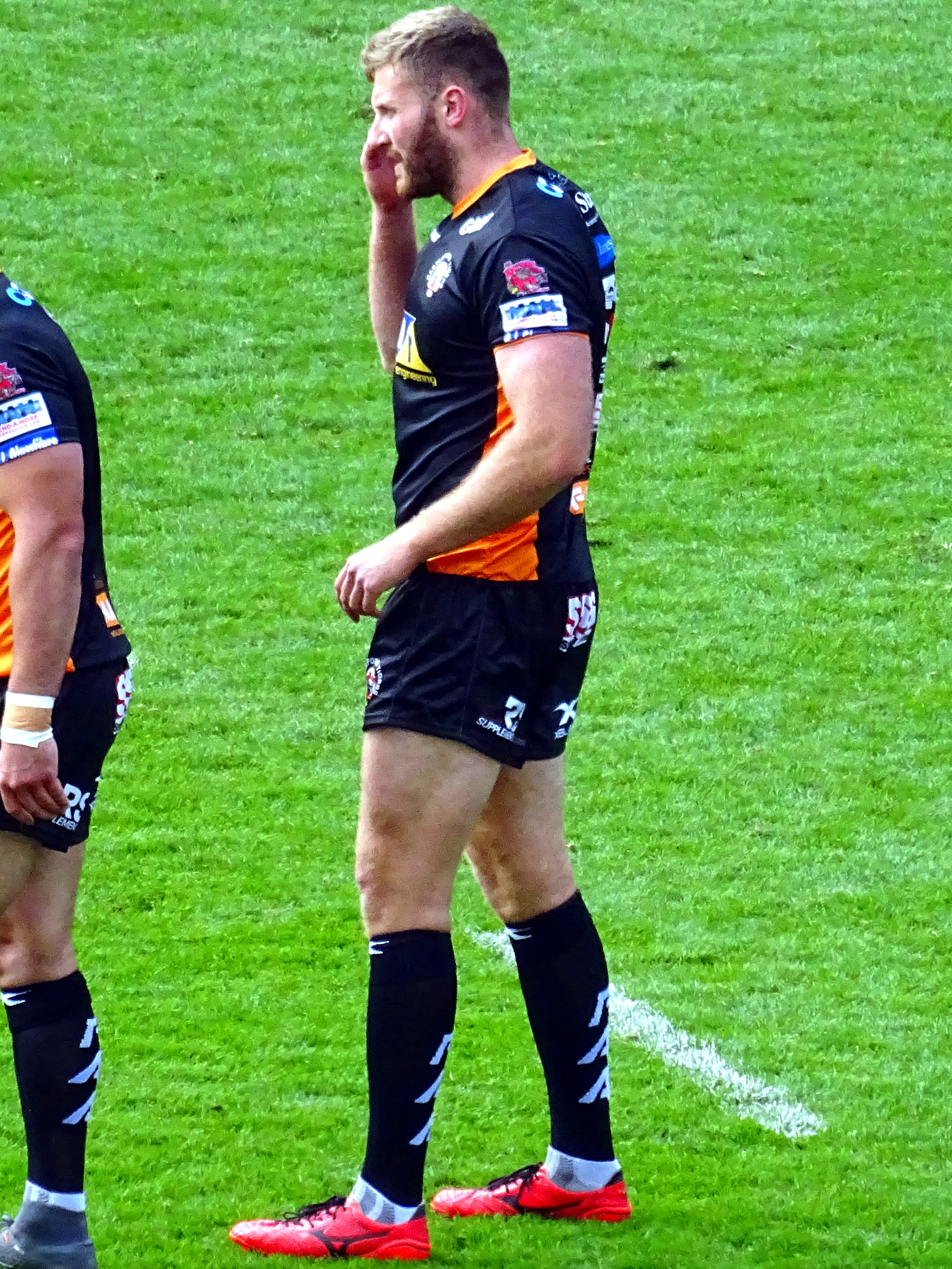

Personal information
- Born: 4 November 1995 (age 29) Haverthwaite, Cumbria, England
- Height: 6 ft 5 in (1.95 m)
- Weight: 17 st 9 lb (112 kg)

Playing information
- Position: Prop
Club
Years	Team	Pld	T	G	FG	P
2014–19	Castleford Tigers	38	1	0	0	4
2016(loan)	→ Oxford RL	5	0	0	0	0
2017(loan)	→ Batley Bulldogs	16	1	0	0	4
2017(loan)	→ Keighley Cougars	1	0	0	0	0
2018(loan)	→ Halifax	26	0	0	0	0
2019(loan)	→ Halifax	2	0	0	0	0
2020–22	Hull Kingston Rovers	42	0	0	0	0
2023–24	Halifax Panthers	8	0	0	0	0
2023(loan)	→ Dewsbury Rams	5	0	0	0	0
2024(loan)	→ Keighley Cougars	1	0	0	0	0
	Total	144	2	0	0	8
- Source: As of 28 January 2024

Will Maher (born 4 November 1995) is an English former rugby league footballer who last played as a prop forward for Keighley Cougars in the RFL League 1, on season-long loan from Halifax Panthers in the RFL Championship.

He has previously played for the Castleford Tigers in the Super League, and spent time on loan from Castleford at Oxford and the Keighley Cougars in League 1, and the Batley Bulldogs and Halifax in the Championship.

== Background ==
Will Maher was born in Haverthwaite, near Ulverston, Cumbria, England. He attended Penny Bridge Primary School in Penny Bridge, and John Ruskin School in Coniston, Cumbria.

== Playing career ==
He spent the 2018 season on loan at Halifax in the Championship.

His brother, Patrick Maher, is a coach at Barrow Raiders.

=== Halifax Panthers ===
In October 2022, Maher signed a two-year contract with Halifax Panthers.

=== Keighley Cougars (loan) ===
On 31 Oct 2023 it was reported that he would join Keighley Cougars on season-long loan for 2024.

At the end of the 2024 season he announced his retirement to take up a role at a school.
