= Callum Lancaster =

English rugby league player

Personal information
- Born: 13 October 1996 (age 29)

Playing information
- Position: Wing
Club
Years	Team	Pld	T	G	FG	P
2014–17	Hull F.C.	7	9	0	0	36
2016(loan)	→ Doncaster	1	0	0	0	0
2017	York City Knights	2	1	0	0	4
2019	Hunslet RLFC	3	1	0	0	4
	Total	13	11	0	0	44
- Source: As of 28 September 2025

Callum Lancaster (born 13 October 1996) was a professional rugby league footballer who played for Hull f.c. in the super league. And last played for Hunslet RLFC in the RFL League 1. He is a winger wing.

== Career ==
Lancaster made his Hull début on 23 May 2014 at only 17 years old. In a super league away match against Leeds. Scoring a hattrick against Warrington wolves in the same season. And been selected in the super league team of the month for July.
