= Tony Smith (rugby league, born 1967) =

Australian rugby league footballer and coach

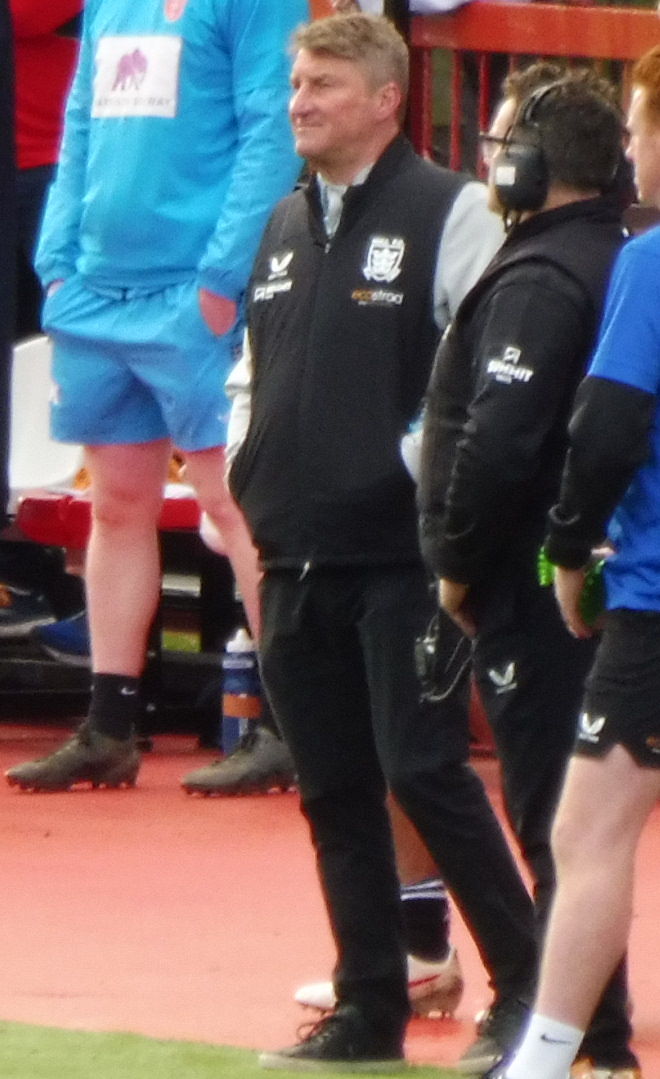

Personal information
- Full name: Tony Smith
- Born: 24 January 1967 (age 59) Grafton, New South Wales, Australia

Playing information
- Position: Five-eighth
Club
Years	Team	Pld	T	G	FG	P
1987–91	Illawarra Steelers	40	9	0	0	36
1992–95	St. George Dragons	48	4	0	0	16
1996	Workington Town	9	1	0	0	4
	Total	97	14	0	0	56

Coaching information
Club
Years	Team	Gms	W	D	L	W%
2001–03	Huddersfield Giants	83	43	3	37	52
2004–07	Leeds Rhinos	134	98	3	33	73
2009–17	Warrington Wolves	301	200	5	95	66
2019–22	Hull Kingston Rovers	75	29	0	46	39
2023–24	Hull F.C.	37	12	0	25	32
	Total	630	382	11	236	61
Representative
Years	Team	Gms	W	D	L	W%
2000	Japan	3	0	0	3	0
2007–09	Great Britain	4	4	0	0	100
2008–09	England	14	6	0	8	43
- Source: As of 16 April 2024
- Relatives: Brian Smith (brother); Rohan Smith (nephew)

Tony Smith (born 24 January 1967) is a professional rugby league coach and former professional rugby league footballer.

He played for the Illawarra Steelers and St. George Dragons in the ARL, and Workington Town in the Super League. He has coached the Huddersfield Giants, Leeds Rhinos, Warrington Wolves, Hull Kingston Rovers and Hull F.C. in the Super League, and Japan, Great Britain and England at international level.

== Background ==
Smith was born in Grafton, New South Wales, Australia.

He is the younger brother of fellow rugby league coach Brian Smith and uncle to former Tonga national team and Leeds Rhinos head coach, Rohan Smith.

Tony played his junior rugby league for the Casino RSM Cougars and was part of their U18 Premiership winning side in 1984.

He holds a British passport.

== Playing career ==
Tony Smith played rugby league with the Illawarra Steelers, for whom he made 40 appearances and scored 9 tries, as well as the St. George Dragons for whom he played 48 games under the coaching of his older brother Brian Smith, including the 1992 NSWRL season's grand final, in which he played from the interchange bench.

=== Workington Town ===
Tony Smith's involvement with British Rugby League began by finishing his playing career in 1996 with a spell at Workington Town in the inaugural Super League season. His initial time at Workington was hampered by Achilles tendon injury suffered two seasons previous, made all the worse by Workington's poor form which saw them relegated to National League One. He also notoriously lived above a Workington fish 'n' chip shop with his wife, commenting "every morning I trudged to training and swore we'd never come back to this country." His most notable on-field contribution was on his début as he helped the club to an 18–18 draw with Halifax Blue Sox, one of only five points that the club secured in 1996 as they finished bottom of Super League. Smith's high bomb led to the side's third try, scored by Wayne Kitchin.

== Coaching career ==
In 2000 he was appointed the head coach of the Japan national rugby league team for the Emerging Nations tournament. Unfortunately his spell wasn't successful as Japan failed and lost all three games in the Tournament.

=== Huddersfield Giants ===
After returning home to Australia after finishing his playing career with Workington, Smith turned to coaching and applied for the job of Super League club Huddersfield Giants in September 2001. His first season in charge saw Huddersfield Giants relegated to National League One, which consequently followed their dreadful start to the season losing 13 games in a row, a record number of consecutive defeats for a coach who held on to his job in British Rugby League.

Conversely, Huddersfield Giants returned to Super League the following year after not losing a single game throughout the National League One season. This culminated in their Grand Final win against Leigh Centurions which secured the team's promotion. In their return season to Super League in 2003 Huddersfield Giants avoided relegation, finishing in 10th place which at the time was by far the club's best Super League finish.

=== Leeds Rhinos ===
Smith was appointed head coach of the Leeds Rhinos in a surprise move in November 2003 as the club decided to move incumbent Daryl Powell into an upstairs role for two years from the start of the 2004 season.

He guided the Leeds Rhinos to their 2004 Super League Grand Final victory against the Bradford Bulls, their first Championship in 32 years, and went on to beat the Canterbury Bulldogs in the 2005 World Club Challenge at Elland Road. In 2005 Leeds made both the Challenge Cup Final and 2005 Super League Grand Final, but were unsuccessful in both matches, losing to Hull F.C. and the Bradford Bulls respectively. Smith was however named Super League coach of the year for 2005 and signed a contract extension to the end of the 2006 season.

The Leeds Rhinos failed to win a trophy in the 2006 season, suffering defeat at the Semi-Final stage of the Challenge Cup and losing out to the Warrington Wolves in 2006's Super League XI Play-Offs.

Smith secured his second Super League championship with victory in the 2007 Super League Grand Final, his final game as coach of Leeds Rhinos.

=== Great Britain ===
Smith was announced as the successor to Brian Noble and became the full-time coach of Great Britain. He saw out his Leeds contract until the end of the 2007 season and combined the GB coaching role with that of performance director and headed up the Rugby Football League's technical department at Leeds Metropolitan University.

His first game in charge of Great Britain was a victory over France. The 3-0 whitewash of New Zealand followed with a 20–14 victory at Huddersfield, a 44-0 thrashing of the Kiwis in the 2nd test at Hull and a final test win at the JJB by 28 points to 22. Leeds Rhinos players contributed hugely to these victories including captain Jamie Peacock, half-backs Rob Burrow and Danny McGuire, second row Gareth Ellis and centre Keith Senior. Smith then led the England side into the 2008 World Cup.

At the end of the year, Smith was named the RLIF Coach of the Year for a successful 2007 season.

=== England ===
Smith became a naturalized British citizen on 8 September 2008 at a ceremony in Huddersfield. He coached England in the 2008 Rugby League World Cup, making the semi-finals.

=== Warrington Wolves ===
On 5 March 2009, Warrington Wolves announced that Smith was to take over as their new head coach while continuing to coach England on a part-time basis. His first game in charge of Warrington was a 14–20 defeat at home to former club Leeds Rhinos.

On 29 August 2009, he led Warrington to their first Challenge Cup Final since 1990, and ultimately the team's first final victory since 1974, beating his former club the Huddersfield Giants 25–16.

Smith coached the Warrington Wolves to their 2010 Challenge Cup Final victory over the Leeds Rhinos at Wembley Stadium, their second consecutive Cup victory.

Smith coached the Warrington Wolves to their first League Leaders' Shield in the Super League era in 2011 and the Warrington Wolves became the first team in 6-years to break 1,000 points scored during one season (the last team to do so being Smith's Leeds Rhinos, along with St. Helens and the Bradford Bulls in the same season).

He led the Wolves to their 2012 Challenge Cup Final victory over the Leeds Rhinos at Wembley Stadium.

He coached the Warrington Wolves to the 2012 Super League Grand Final defeat by the Leeds Rhinos at Old Trafford.

He played in the 2013 Super League Grand Final defeat by the Wigan Warriors at Old Trafford.

He coached the Warrington Wolves to the 2016 Challenge Cup Final defeat by Hull F.C. at Wembley Stadium.

After leading Warrington Wolves to the Super League Grand Final in 2012, 2013 and 2016 at Old Trafford, and also his second League Leaders' Shield in 2016, his spell as Warrington Wolves coach ended in 2017 when he departed the club at the end of the 2017 Super League season; at the time he was the league's longest-serving coach.

=== Hull Kingston Rovers ===
Smith was announced as the new head coach of Hull Kingston Rovers on 6 June 2019 following the sacking of former Hull KR coach Tim Sheens the day before. At the end of the 2019 Super League season, Hull KR finished 11th on the table. In Smith's first full season as head coach in 2020, Hull KR finished bottom of the Super League but were spared from relegation due to the COVID-19 pandemic and the expulsion of Toronto. In the 2021 Super League season, Smith guided Hull KR to sixth on the table as they qualified for the playoffs for the first time since 2013. After upsetting Warrington 19–0 in the first week of the playoffs, Hull KR travelled to France for the semi-final against Catalans Dragons. Hull KR would lose the match 28-10 which ended their season one game short of the grand final.

On 4 July 2022, Smith was terminated as head coach of Hull Kingston Rovers after the club had only won a single match since St. George's Day of the 2022 season with the side were sitting 10th on the table. Smith had announced in April that he was leaving the club at the end of the campaign which resulted in a massive drop in form. Smith was replaced by interim head coach Danny McGuire.

=== Hull F.C. ===
On 13 September 2022, Smith was announced as the new head coach of Hull F.C. In the Super League XXVIII season, Smith's first year in charge ended with a 10th placed finish. On 11 April 2024, Smith stepped down as head coach after 18 months in charge. Hull F.C. had started the 2024 Super League season poorly losing six of their first seven matches with their only victory coming in a last gasp effort against the London Broncos. Under Smith, Hull F.C. in 2024 conceded 50 points or more on three occasions.
