= Jansin Turgut =

RL coach & former Turkey international rugby league footballer

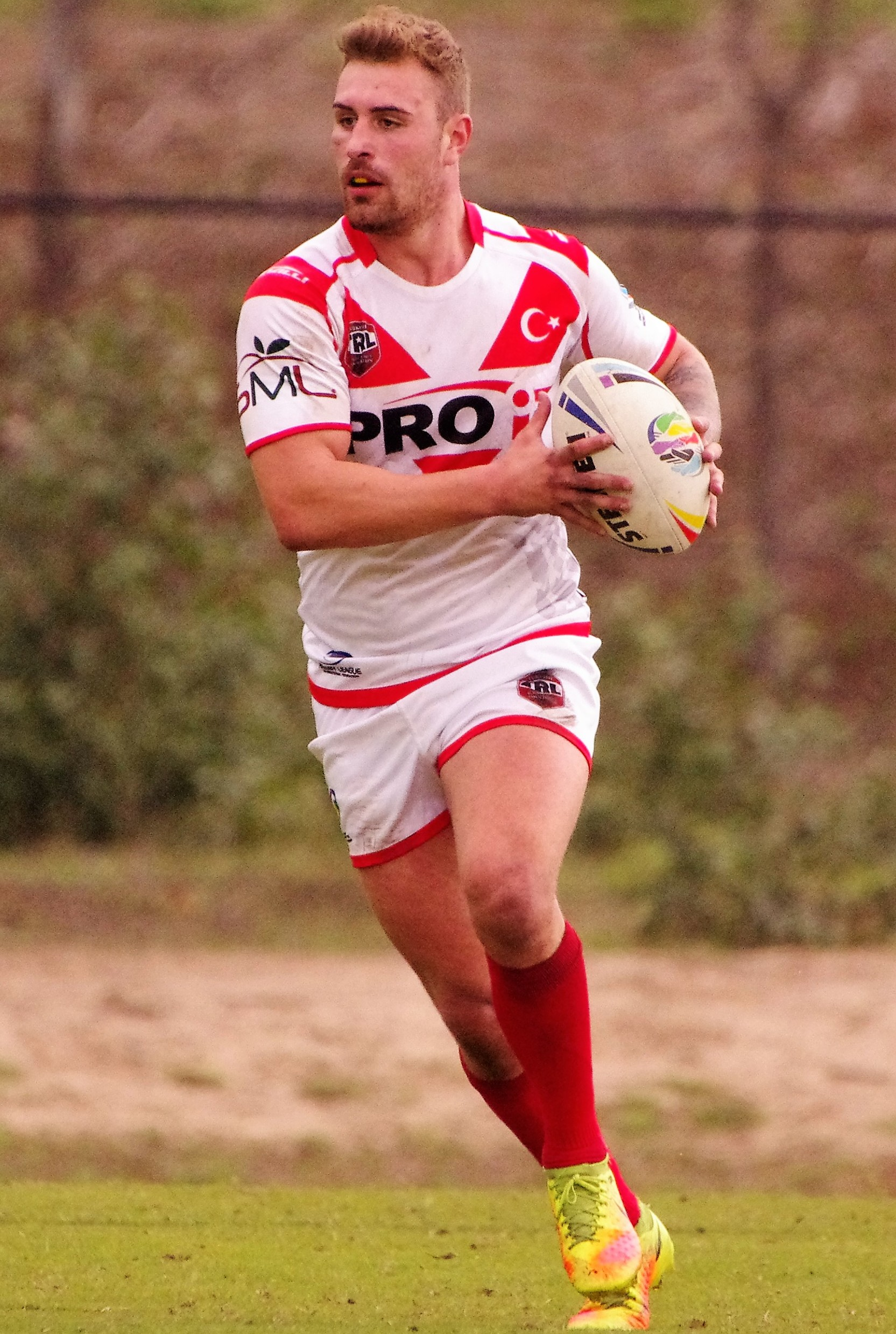

Personal information
- Born: 8 March 1996 (age 29) Hull, Humberside, England
- Height: 6 ft 1 in (1.85 m)
- Weight: 15 st 4 lb (97 kg)

Playing information
- Position: Loose forward, Second-row
Club
Years	Team	Pld	T	G	FG	P
2015–18	Hull F.C.	30	4	0	0	16
2015(loan)	→ Doncaster	10	4	0	0	16
2016(loan)	→ Doncaster	1	0	0	0	0
2018(loan)	→ Featherstone Rovers	2	0	0	0	0
2018(loan)	→ Doncaster	2	2	0	0	8
2018–19	Salford Red Devils	12	1	0	0	4
2023	Bradford Bulls	2	0	0	0	0
	Total	59	11	0	0	44
Representative
Years	Team	Pld	T	G	FG	P
2018	Turkey	4	2	0	0	8
- Source: As of 20 August 2025

Jansin Turgut (born 8 March 1996) is a Turkish international rugby league footballer who plays as a back row forward. He previously played for Hull FC and Salford. Turgut captained the Turkish national team during their international debut at the 2018 Emerging Nations World Championship.

== Background ==
Turgut was born in Kingston upon Hull, Humberside, England, and is of Turkish descent through his father.

== Playing career ==
=== Early career ===
Turgut represented England Academy (u18) against the Australian Schoolboys in 2014.

=== Hull ===
Turgut made his Hull F.C. début on 5 March 2015 in a Super League match against Leeds Rhinos at the KC Stadium.

=== Doncaster ===
In 2015, Turgut was dual registered with Championship club Doncaster. He made his Dons début on 15 March 2015 in a match against Hunslet.

=== Salford ===
Turgut joined Salford Red Devils "on a short-term deal" towards the end of the 2018 season.

== Coaching ==
On 17 June 2020 it was announced that he had joined the coaching staff of West Hull A.R.L.F.C.

== Personal ==
On 21 May 2019, it was reported that Turgut had fallen three storeys; attaining severe injuries and being put on life support.

On 25 January 2020 he admitted that the fall from a third storey car park in Ibiza had been a suicide attempt.
