= Jimmy Keinhorst =

German dual-code rugby international footballer (born 1990)

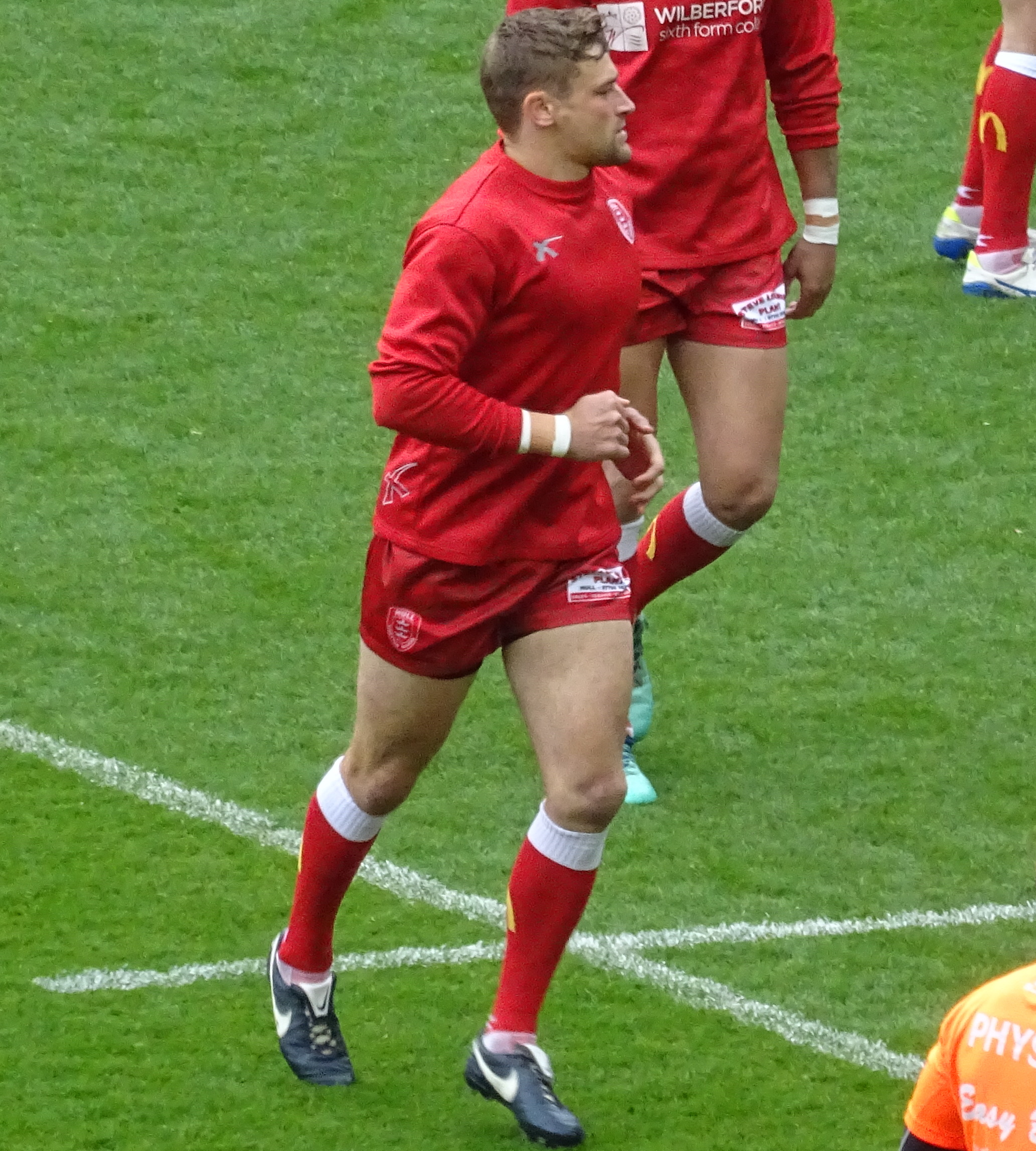
- Keinhorst in 2019

Personal information
- Full name: Thomas James Keinhorst
- Born: 14 July 1990 (age 36) Leeds, West Yorkshire, England
- Height: 6 ft 1 in (1.86 m)
- Weight: 14 st 7 lb (92 kg)

Playing information

Rugby union
- Position: Inside-Centre, Outside-Centre, Second Row
Club
Years	Team	Pld	T	G	FG	P
2009–10	Heidelberger RK	8	4	0	0	20
2010–11	Otley	11	3	0	0	15
	Total	19	7	0	0	35
Representative
Years	Team	Pld	T	G	FG	P
2010	Germany	2	1	0	0	5

Rugby league
- Position: Centre, Second-row
Club
Years	Team	Pld	T	G	FG	P
2012–18	Leeds Rhinos	90	32	0	0	128
2013(loan)	→ Hunslet Hawks	15	13	1	0	54
2014(loan)	→ Wakefield Trinity Wildcats	7	1	0	0	4
2015(loan)	→ Hunslet Hawks	9	3	0	0	12
2018(loan)	→ Widnes Vikings	3	1	0	0	4
2019–23	Hull Kingston Rovers	71	14	0	0	56
2020(loan)	→ York City Knights	5	2	0	0	8
2021(loan)	→ Castleford Tigers	2	1	0	0	4
2023(DR)	→ Keighley Cougars	2	1	0	0	4
2024	York Knights	22	10	2	0	44
	Total	226	78	3	0	318
Representative
Years	Team	Pld	T	G	FG	P
2007–12	Germany	9	17	15	0	98
- Source: As of 21 January 2024
- Education: St. Mary's Catholic High School
- Relatives: Kristian Keinhorst (brother)

Thomas James Keinhorst (born 14 July 1990) is a German former international rugby league footballer who last played as a centre or second-row forward for York Knights in the RFL Championship.

He has previously played for the Leeds Rhinos and Hull KR in the Super League, and spent time on loan from Leeds at the Hunslet Hawks in the Championship, as well as the Wakefield Trinity Wildcats and the Widnes Vikings in the Super League. Keinhorst has also spent time on loan from Hull KR at the York City Knights in the Championship.

He has played rugby union for Heidelberger RK in the German Rugby-Bundesliga and in England with Otley in National League 1. He also represented Germany at international level.

== Background ==
Keinhorst was born in Leeds, West Yorkshire, England.

== Playing career ==
Keinhorst began playing rugby league in 2004, while attending St. Mary's Catholic High School.

=== Playing positions ===
==== Rugby union ====
He primarily played as an inside-centre, but he could also play as an outside-centre or in the second row.

=== Senior rugby union career ===
==== Heidelberger RK (2009–2010) ====
Keinhorst began playing rugby union as an amateur with Otley and he later moved to Germany to play for Heidelberger RK in 2009, at the age of 19, and he won the National Championship in the 2009–10 season.

He played eight games and scored four tries in his first season.

==== Otley (2010–2011) ====
Keinhorst rejoined Otley as a semi-professional in 2010, and went onto make 11 appearances in the 2010–11 season, scoring three tries before leaving at the end of the season to sign a professional contract at rugby league side the Leeds Rhinos.

=== Senior rugby league career ===
==== Leeds (2012–2018) ====
Keinhorst signed for Leeds in 2011, and made his Super League début on 30 July 2012, in the defeat by the Wakefield Trinity Wildcats.

Keinhorst came on as a substitute in Leeds' losing effort in the 2012 Challenge Cup Final defeat by Warrington at Wembley Stadium.

Keinhorst played from the interchange bench for Leeds in the 2015 Super League Grand Final, and helped to set-up the winning try for Josh Walters, in a 22–20 victory over Wigan.

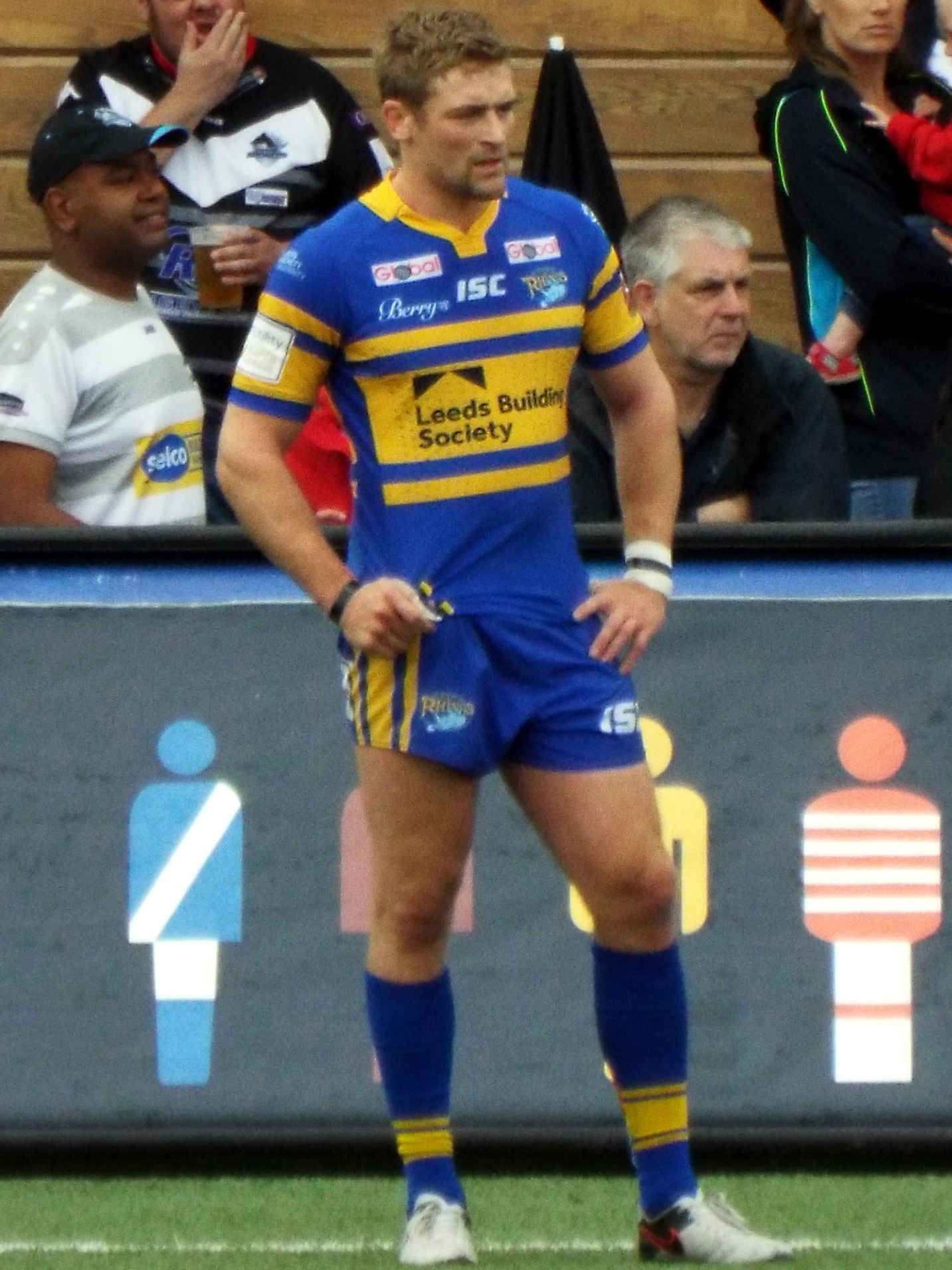
Keinhorst playing for the Leeds Rhinos in 2016

Keinhorst scored a hat-trick of tries for Leeds in round 2 of the 2018 Super League season, against Hull Kingston Rovers at Elland Road.

It was revealed at the end of the 2018 campaign, that Keinhorst would be departing Leeds to sign a contract to play for Hull Kingston Rovers.

==== Hull Kingston Rovers (2019–present) ====
In October 2018, Keinhorst signed a three-year deal with Hull Kingston Rovers.

On 9 January 2019, Keinhorst received the number 4 jersey ahead of the start of the Super League season. On 13 January 2019, Keinhorst made his non-competitive Hull Kingston Rovers' début in a pre-season friendly against Widnes, Keinhorst claimed a 30–16 victory with his new club.

Keinhorst made his first competitive appearance for Hull Kingston Rovers in round 1 of the 2019 Super League season, Keinhorst scored a dramatic try in the final six seconds of the match on his début, going onto record a thrilling 18–16 victory over cross-city rivals Hull F.C. at Craven Park.

On 4 September 2020 it was reported that Keinhorst would resume with Hull KR after his loan period at the York City Knights.

==== Castleford (loan) ====
On 31 July 2021, it was reported that he had signed for Castleford in the Super League on a short-term loan.

==== Keighley (loan) ====
On 24 March 2023, Keinhorst joined Keighley for one match on loan from Hull Kingston Rovers through dual registration.

==== York RLFC ====
On 13 October 2023, it was reported that he had joined York RLFC for the 2024 RFL Championship on a one-year deal. In August 2024, he announced his retirement from rugby league.

=== Representative career ===
==== Rugby union ====
He made his début for Germany in a match against Poland on 20 November 2010.

Keinhorst scored his first try for Germany a week later against the Netherlands in Amsterdam.

==== Rugby league ====
Keinhorst is the youngest of four rugby-playing brothers and qualifies to play for Germany through his German father Wolfgang, who has lived in the United Kingdom for many years.

Jimmy and his three brothers, Kristian, Markus and Nicholas set a world record in 2007, when they played in a rugby league international game for Germany against the Czech Republic, becoming the most siblings to play in a rugby league international match.

As of 2012, Keinhorst was the top try and point scorer for Germany.

== Honours ==
=== Career awards and accolades ===
==== Rugby league ====
===== Club (Leeds Rhinos 2012–2018) =====
- Super League (1): 2015
- League Leaders' Shield (1): 2015

==== Rugby union ====
===== Club (Heidelberger RK 2009-10) =====
- German Rugby Union Championship (1): 2009–10
