= Owen Harrison =

English professional rugby league footballer

Personal information
- Born: 10 April 1999 (age 25); England

Playing information
- Height: 6 ft 5 in (1.96 m)
- Weight: 16 st 1 lb (102 kg)
- Position: Prop
Club
Years	Team	Pld	T	G	FG	P
2019–21	Hull Kingston Rovers	14	0	0	0	0
2019(loan)	→ Dewsbury Rams	5	1	0	0	4
2021(loan)	→ Newcastle Thunder	8	1	0	0	4
2022–	Dewsbury Rams	0	0	0	0	0
	Total	27	2	0	0	8

Owen Harrison (born 10 April 1999) is an English professional rugby league footballer who plays as a prop forward for Dewsbury Rams in the RFL Championship.

== Career ==
Harrison signed for Hull Kingston Rovers in 2019, but made his professional debut on loan to Championship team Dewsbury Rams. After the loan period at Dewsbury, Harrison's debut for Hull KR was in a Challenge Cup match against Leigh Centurions.

After making 14 appearances for Rovers during 2019 and 2020, Harrison was not selected by Rovers during the start of the 2021 season and in June 2021 he joined Newcastle Thunder in the Championship on loan until the end of the season.

At the end of the 2021 season Harrison was released by Hull KR and signed for Dewsbury, but in December 2021 he announced his immediate retirement from the game to follow a career with a property business.

== Background ==
Harrison is the son of former Hull Kingston Rovers player Chris Harrison and Kerry Harrison, and is the nephew of another Hull KR player, Des Harrison.
