= Jamie Ellis =

English rugby league footballer

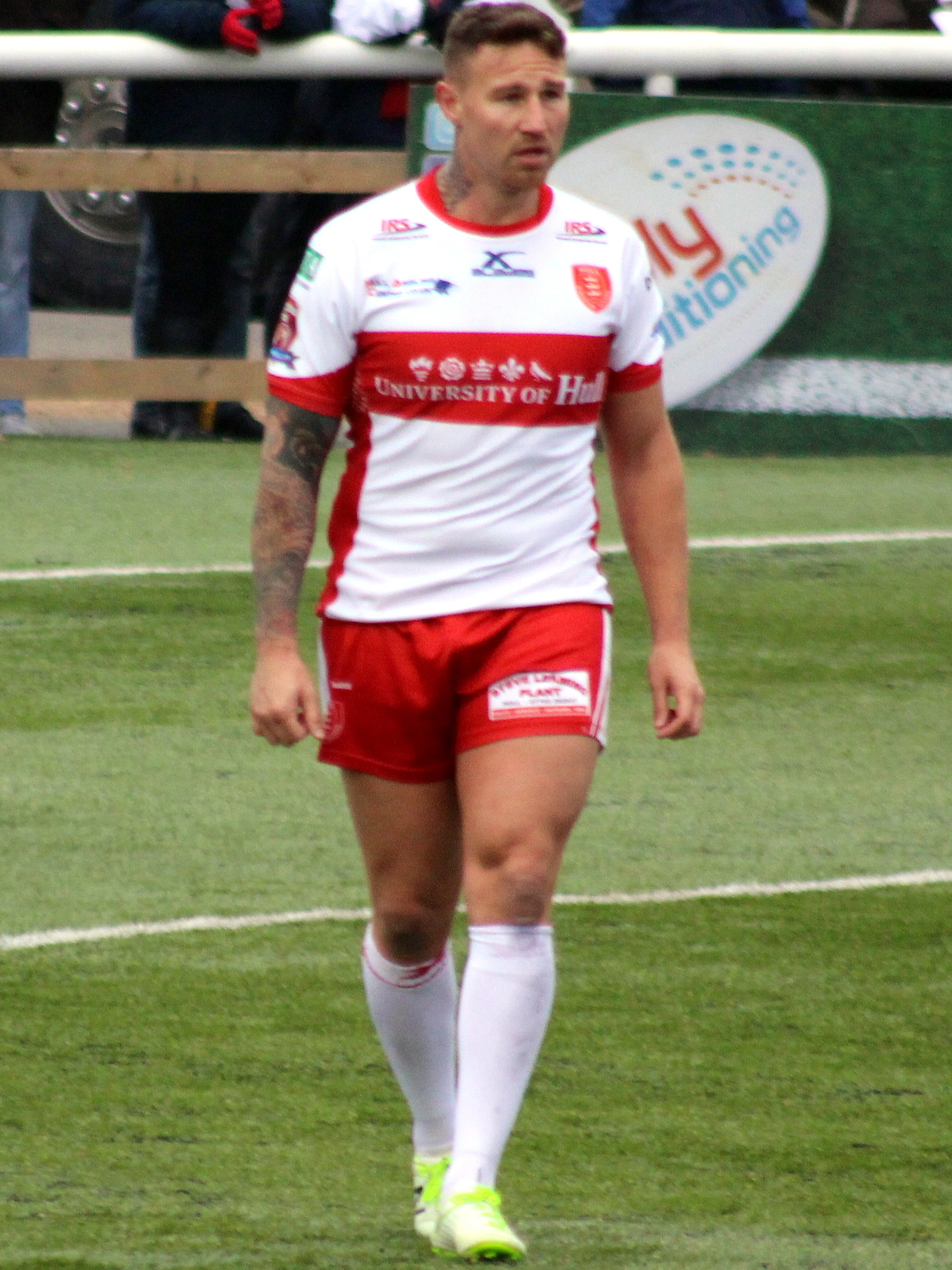

Personal information
- Full name: James Ellis
- Born: 4 October 1989 (age 35); St Helens, Merseyside, England
- Height: 5 ft 10 in (1.77 m)
- Weight: 14 st 13 lb (95 kg)

Playing information
- Position: Scrum-half, Stand-off, Hooker
Club
Years	Team	Pld	T	G	FG	P
2009–10	St Helens	3	0	1	0	2
2011	Leigh Centurions	31	34	14	0	164
2012	Hull F.C.	10	1	0	0	4
2012–14	Castleford Tigers	50	15	82	1	225
2015–17	Huddersfield Giants	47	16	47	3	161
2017(loan)	→ Hull Kingston Rovers	30	8	158	1	349
2018–19	Castleford Tigers	23	2	73	1	155
2020	Hull Kingston Rovers	8	3	21	0	54
2021	Leigh Centurions	8	1	1	0	6
2021(loan)	→York City Knights	2	0	0	0	0
2022	York Knights	17	3	40	0	92
2023(loan)	→ Swinton Lions	2	1	0	1	5
2023–24	Oldham	16	1	61	0	126
	Total	247	85	498	7	1343
- Source: As of 28 January 2024

Jamie Ellis (born 4 October 1989) is a former English professional rugby league footballer who most recently played as a scrum-half, stand-off or hooker for Oldham RLFC in RFL League 1.

He has previously played for St Helens, Leigh, Hull FC, Castleford Tigers, Hull Kingston Rovers and the Huddersfield Giants in the Super League. He has also spent time on loan from Huddersfield at Hull Kingston Rovers during 2017's Super League XXII, to which he returned on a 1-year deal for 2020's Super League XXV.

== Background ==
Ellis was born in St Helens, Merseyside, England.

== Early career ==
Ellis was as a youngster with the amateur team Chorley Panthers.

== Playing career ==
=== St Helens ===
Ellis made his professional début in a 10–20 defeat by Salford City Reds in 2009's Super League XIV. He since featured against Harlequins RL in 2009's Super League XIV Round 22 game, where he came off the bench to be utilised as a hooker.

=== Leigh Centurions ===
At the end of 2010's Super League XV, Ellis left St. Helens, after falling out of favour with new coach Royce Simmons, and a run of bad injuries saw him leave the Super League side. He joined Championship outfit Leigh Centurions on a one-year contract.

=== Hull F.C. ===
In May 2011 it was confirmed that Ellis would be moving to Super League side Hull F.C. for the start of the 2012 campaign.

=== Castleford Tigers ===
In June 2012, Ellis signed a contract with the Castleford Tigers for the 2013 season where he then left at the end of 2014.

Ellis played in the 2014 Challenge Cup Final against Leeds at Wembley Stadium.

=== Huddersfield Giants ===
In October 2014, it was announced that he would join the Huddersfield Giants on a two-year deal starting in 2015.

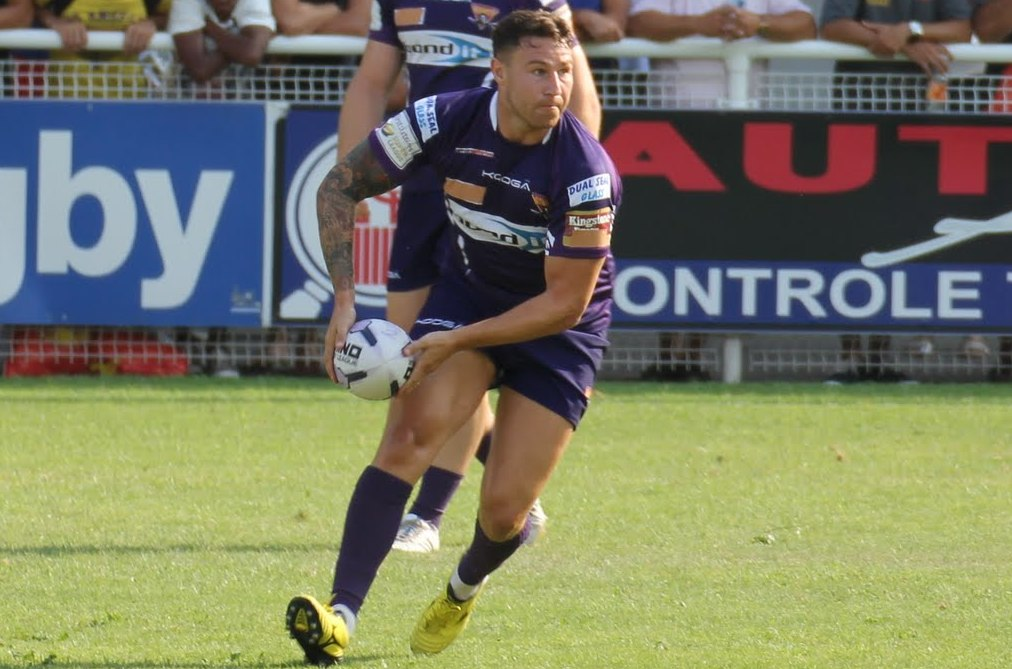
Ellis playing for the Huddersfield Giants in 2015

=== Hull Kingston Rovers ===
In 2016, Ellis joined Hull Kingston Rovers on a season-long loan deal, citing Head Coach Tim Sheens' intentions of getting Hull Kingston Rovers back into the Super League. On 6 December 2019 Ellis returned to Hull Kingston Rovers on a one-year contract for 2020.

=== Castleford Tigers (re-join) ===
In 2017 Ellis signed again with Castleford on a three-year deal.

=== Leigh Centurions (re-join) ===
Ellis re-signed for Leigh for the 2021 season. He also spent a short two-week loan spell at York City Knights in Jun 2021.

=== York City Knights ===
On 30 September 2021 it was reported that he had signed for the York City Knights in the RFL Championship

=== Oldham RLFC ===
On 14 July 2023 it was reported that he had signed for the Oldham RLFC in the RFL League 1
