= Adam Quinlan =

Australian professional rugby league footballer

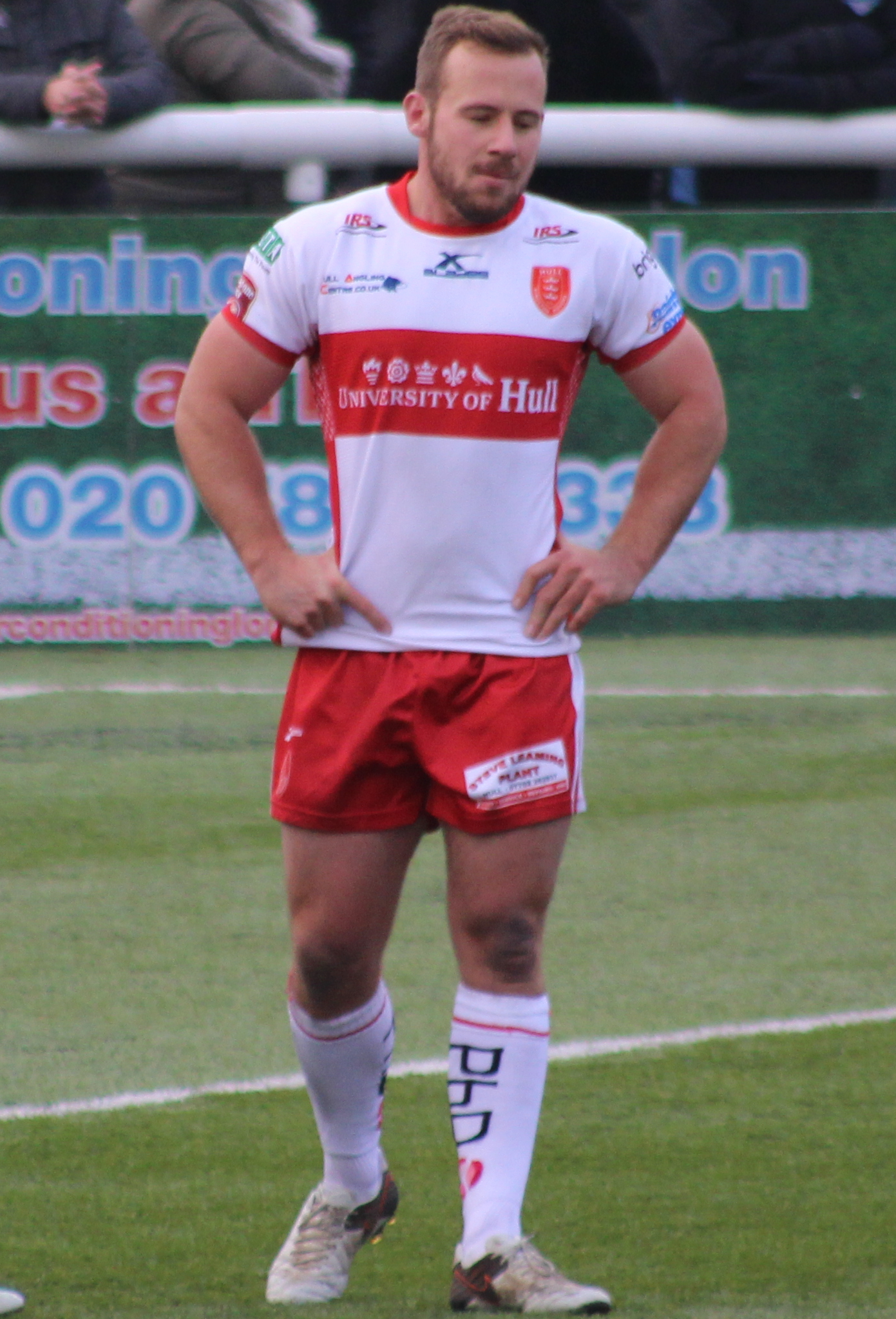

Personal information
- Full name: Adam Quinlan
- Born: 13 November 1992 (age 34) Kogarah, New South Wales, Australia

Playing information
- Height: 5 ft 8 in (1.72 m)
- Weight: 12 st 13 lb (82 kg)
- Position: Fullback, Stand-off
Club
Years	Team	Pld	T	G	FG	P
2013–14	St. George Illawarra	25	8	0	0	32
2015	St Helens	12	6	0	0	24
2016	St. George Illawarra	4	1	0	0	4
2017–21	Hull Kingston Rovers	65	30	0	0	120
	Total	106	45	0	0	180

Adam Quinlan (born 13 November 1992) is an Australian former professional rugby league footballer who last played as a fullback for Hull Kingston Rovers in the Super League.

He has previously played for the St. George Illawarra Dragons in two separate spells in the NRL and St Helens in the Super League.

== Background ==
Quinlan was born in Kogarah, New South Wales, Australia.

== Playing career ==
=== St. George Illawarra (2013–14) ===
Quinlan played his junior rugby league for the Culburra Dolphins, before being signed by St. George Illawarra.

In 2012, Quinlan played for the St. George Illawarra Dragons' National Youth Competition team.

In 2013, Quinlan graduated onto the St. George Illawarra New South Wales Cup team, the Illawarra Cutters.

In round 9 of the 2013 NRL season, he made his NRL début for St. George against the Gold Coast playing at fullback in club's 15–14 loss, at Cbus Super Stadium.

In only his third match in round 19, he scored his first NRL career try in the St. George's 22–18 win, over South Sydney at ANZ Stadium.

On 31 July 2013, he re-signed with St. George on a two-year contract.

He finished off his début year in the NRL having played in 10 matches and scoring 5 tries in total.

In February 2014, Quinlan played for St. George in the inaugural NRL Auckland Nines. He finished off the 2014 season having played in 15 matches and scoring three tries.

=== Parramatta Eels (2015) ===
On 27 January 2015, Quinlan signed a one-year contract with the Parramatta Eels.

Quinlan played for the Wentworthville Magpies, Parramatta's feeder club in the Intrust Super Premiership.

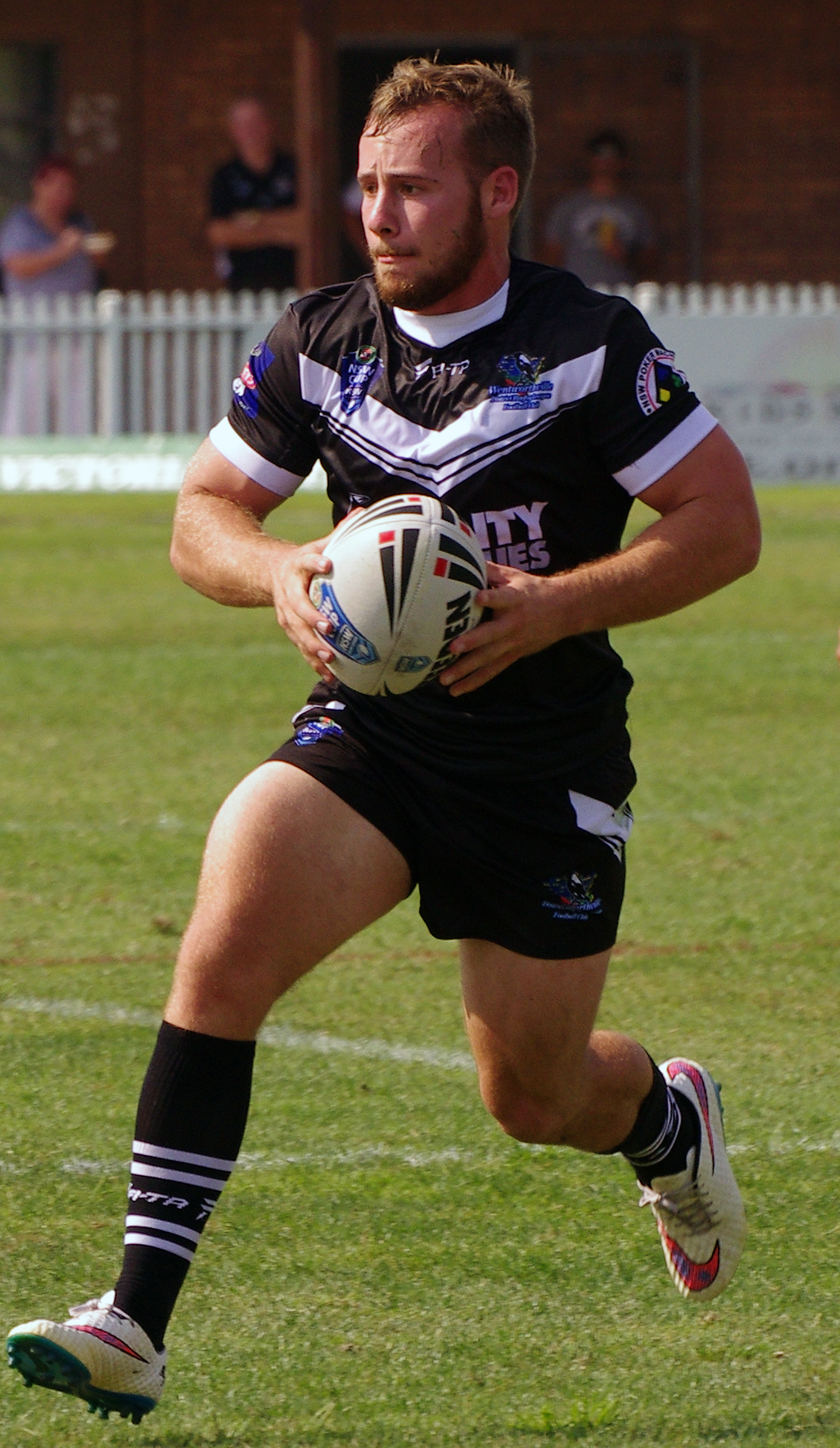
Quinlan playing for the Wentworthville Magpies in 2015

=== St Helens (2015) ===
On 2 July 2015, without playing a first-grade game for the Parramatta Eels. He joined Super League club St. Helens. The move came mid-season effective immediately, after being released from his Parramatta contract.

Quinlan made 12 appearances and scored 6 tries for the St Helens, in a short-spell at the club.

=== St. George Illawarra Dragons (2016) ===
In 2016, Quinlan returned to St. George Illawarra on a one-year contract.

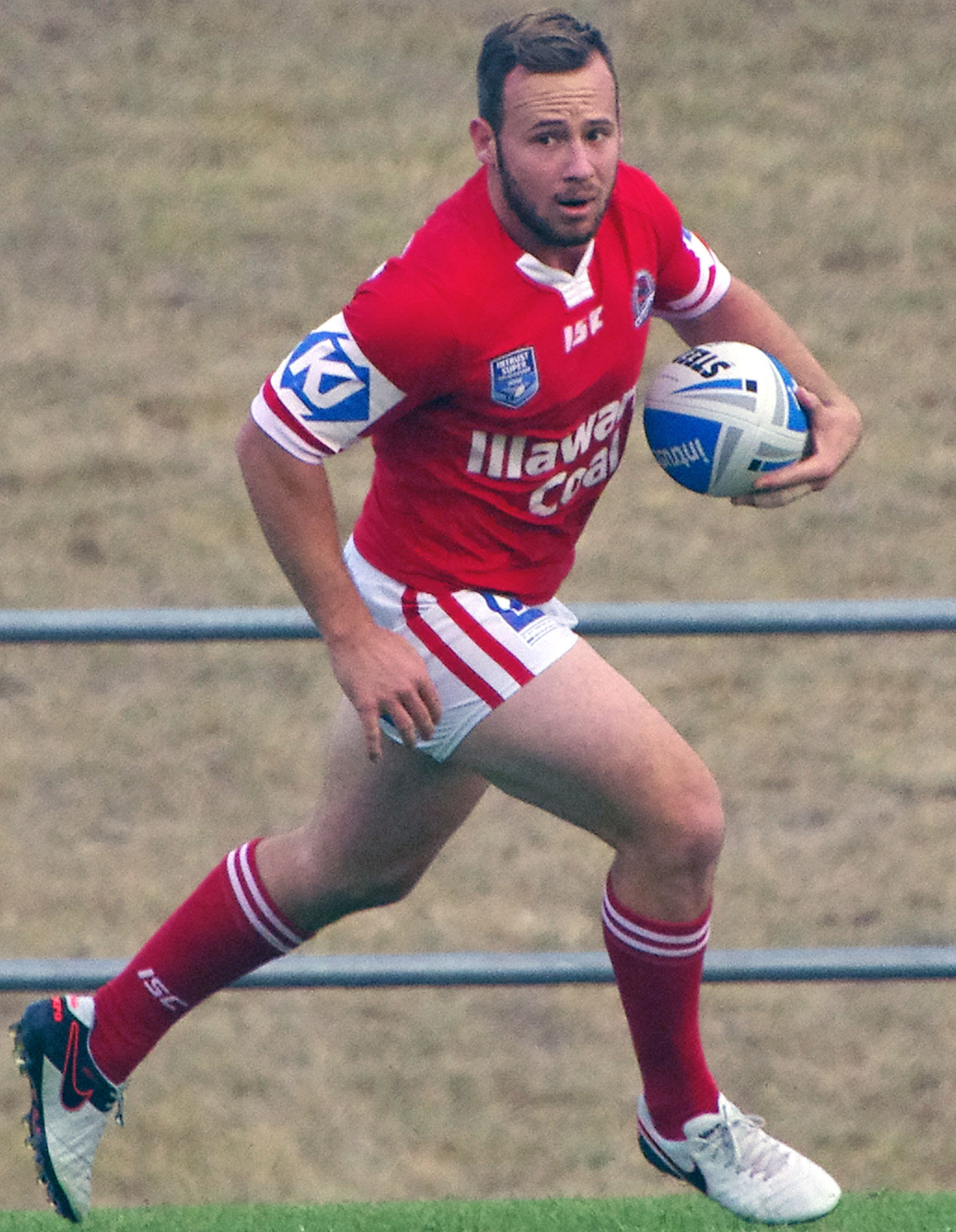
Quinlan playing for Illawarra in 2016

Quinlan was a member of the Illawarra Cutters side which won the 2016 New South Wales Cup, with a subsequent 21–20 victory over the Mount Pritchard Mounties in the final.

Quinlan then went onto play in the State Championship match at Stadium Australia against Queensland Cup winners the Burleigh Bears, with the Illawarra Cutters winning the match 54–12, with Quinlan scoring a try.

=== Hull Kingston Rovers (2017 – 2021) ===
Quinlan joined Hull Kingston Rovers in the Championship on a two-year contract, prior to the start of the 2017 season. Quinlan earned promotion with Hull Kingston Rovers back to the Super League in his first season with the club. It was revealed on 4 July 2018, that Quinlan had signed a two-year contract extension, to extend his stay beyond the 2018 rugby league season and to remain at Hull Kingston Rovers until at least the end of the 2020 campaign.

On 9 September 2018, during a 38–24 Qualifiers triumph during a game against Halifax, Quinlan unfortunately suffered a season ending anterior cruciate ligament (ACL) knee injury that required corrective surgery and that would prove to rule him out of action for the foreseeable future.

In December 2021 Adam Quinlan announced his retirement from rugby league On 7 December 2021, Quinlan confirmed that he would retire after he failed to secure another contract with an English club, following his exit from Hull KR.

== Honours ==
=== Club (Hull Kingston Rovers 2017 – present) ===
- 2018: Roger Millward – 'Player of the Year Award'
- 2018: 'Players' Player of the Year Award'
- 2018: 'Members' Player of the Year Award'
- 2018: 'Tackle of the Season Award'
