= Man of Steel Awards =

Annual award for Super League's player of the season in rugby league

Steve Prescott Man Of Steel
- Awarded for: Best player of the Super League season
- Country: United Kingdom
- Presented by: Rugby Football League

History
- First award: 1977
- First winner: (England) David Ward
- Most wins: (England) Ellery Hanley (3); Wigan Warriors (11)
- Most recent: (England) Brad O'Neill (Wigan Warriors) (2026)

The Steve Prescott Man of Steel Awards is an end-of-season awards dinner for the Super League rugby league competition. The event's name is taken from the main award presented, the Man of Steel award for the rugby league footballer of the year. In 2014, it was renamed after Steve Prescott.

== Origins ==
The awards were started in 1977 when David Howes, the Rugby League's public relations officer, organised sponsorship worth £3,000 from Trumanns Steel Limited for awards in six different categories; Trumanns Man of Steel, Division One Player of the Year, Division Two Player of the Year, Coach of the Year, Young Player of the Year and Referee of the Year. The awards were voted on by the members of the rugby league press. The first awards were made at the end of the 1976–77 season with the inaugural award winners being:

- Trumanns Man of Steel - David Ward, Leeds
- Division One Player of the Year - Malcolm Reilly, Castleford
- Division Two Player of the Year - Ged Marsh, Blackpool Borough
- Young Player of the Year - David Ward, Leeds
- Coach of the Year - Eric Ashton, St Helens
- Referee of the Year - Billy Thompson

In 2008, the voting for the award was changed, with the winner being chosen by the players of the Super League instead. In 2019, in response to criticism that some players were not taking the voting seriously, a panel of former rugby league players was chosen to determine the winner of the award. The voting was changed to a system similar to the Australian Dally M Medal, with points being awarded to the best performing players after each game (three points for the man of the match, two points for the runner-up, and one point for the third best player).

=== Name change ===
Former England player Steve Prescott died in 2013 aged just 39, clear of cancer after multi visceral transplant complications. He raised many thousands of pounds for charity,. Following a short campaign, a petition with over 12,000 signatures was sent to the Rugby Football League, calling for the Man of Steel award to be renamed in Prescott's honour. In March 2014, the RFL officially announced that the award would be called the "Steve Prescott Man of Steel" from the 2014 season onwards.

== Man of Steel ==
Year	Nat	Winner	Club	Position
1977	(England)	David Ward	Leeds	Hooker
1978	(England)	George Nicholls	St. Helens	Prop
1979	(England)	Doug Laughton	Widnes	Loose forward
1980	(Scotland)	George Fairbairn	Wigan	Fullback
1981	(England)	Ken Kelly	Warrington	Scrum-half
1982	(England)	Mick Morgan	Carlisle	Second-row
1983	(England)	Allan Agar	Featherstone Rovers	Coach
1984	(England)	Joe Lydon	Widnes	Wing, Fullback
1985	(England)	Ellery Hanley	Bradford Northern	Stand-off
1986	(Australia)	Gavin Miller	Hull Kingston Rovers	Loose forward
1987	(England)	Ellery Hanley	Wigan	Stand-off
1988	(England)	Martin Offiah	Widnes	Wing
1989	(England)	Ellery Hanley	Wigan	Loose forward
1990	(England)	Shaun Edwards	Wigan	Stand-off
1991	(England)	Garry Schofield	Leeds	Stand-off
1992	(New Zealand)	Dean Bell	Wigan	Centre
1993	(England)	Andy Platt	Wigan	Prop
1994	(Wales)	Jonathan Davies	Warrington	Centre
1995	(England)	Denis Betts	Wigan	Second-row
1996	(England)	Andy Farrell	Wigan	Loose forward
1997	(England)	James Lowes	Bradford	Hooker
1998	(Wales)	Iestyn Harris	Leeds	Fullback
1999	(Australia)	Adrian Vowles	Castleford	Loose forward
2000	(England)	Sean Long	St. Helens	Scrum-half
2001	(England)	Paul Sculthorpe	St. Helens	Stand-off
2002	(England)	Paul Sculthorpe	St. Helens	Loose forward
2003	(England)	Jamie Peacock	Bradford	Second-row
2004	(England)	Andy Farrell	Wigan	Prop, Second-row
2005	(Australia)	Jamie Lyon	St. Helens	Centre
2006	(England)	Paul Wellens	St. Helens	Fullback
2007	(England)	James Roby	St. Helens	Hooker
2008	(England)	James Graham	St. Helens	Prop
2009	(Australia)	Brett Hodgson	Huddersfield	Fullback
2010	(Ireland)	Pat Richards	Wigan	Wing
2011	(New Zealand)	Rangi Chase	Castleford	Stand-off
2012	(England)	Sam Tomkins	Wigan	Fullback
2013	(Scotland)	Danny Brough	Huddersfield	Scrum-half
2014	(England)	Daryl Clark	Castleford	hooker
2015	(England)	Zak Hardaker	Leeds	Fullback
2016	(England)	Danny Houghton	Hull	Hooker
2017	(England)	Luke Gale	Castleford	Scrum-half
2018	(Australia)	Ben Barba	St. Helens	Fullback
2019	(Australia)	Jackson Hastings	Salford	scrum-half, stand-off
2020	(England)	Paul McShane	Castleford	scrum-half, hooker
2021	(England)	Sam Tomkins	Catalans	Fullback
2022	(Australia)	Brodie Croft	Salford	scrum-half
2023	(Australia)	Bevan French	Wigan	stand-off
2024	(England)	Mikey Lewis	Hull KR	scrum-half
2025	(England)	Jake Connor	Leeds	scrum-half
2026	(England)	Brad O'Neill	Wigan	hooker

=== Multiple winners ===
	Player	Wins	Winning years
1	(England) Ellery Hanley	3	1985, 1987, 1989
2	(England) Paul Sculthorpe	2	2001, 2002
3	(England) Andy Farrell	2	1996, 2004
3	(England) Sam Tomkins	2	2012, 2021

=== Winners by club ===
	Club	Wins
1	Wigan Warriors	13
2	St. Helens	9
3	Castleford Tigers	5
3	Leeds Rhinos	5
5	Widnes Vikings	3
5	Bradford Bulls	3
7	Warrington Wolves	2
7	Huddersfield Giants	2
7	Hull Kingston Rovers	2
7	Salford Red Devils	2
9	Carlisle	1
9	Catalans Dragons	1
9	Featherstone Rovers	1
9	Hull F.C.	1

=== Winners by country ===
	Nationality	Wins
1	England	35
2	Australia	9
3	Scotland	2
4	Wales	2
5	New Zealand	2

== Woman of Steel ==
In 2018 an additional category for the Woman of Steel from the Women's Super League was inaugurated.

Year	Winner	Club
2018	(England) Georgia Roche	Castleford Tigers
2019	(Australia) Courtney Hill	Leeds Rhinos
2020	No award	
2021	(England) Jodie Cunningham	St. Helens
2022	(England) Tara-Jane Stanley	York City Knights
2023	(England) Sinead Peach	York Valkyrie
2024	(England) Georgie Hetherington	York Valkyrie
2025	(England) Eva Hunter	Wigan Warriors
2026	(England) Jenna Foubister	Wigan Warriors

== Wheels of Steel ==
In 2023 a new category for Wheels of Steel from the RFL Wheelchair Super League was inaugurated.

Year	Winner	Club
2023	(England) Lewis King	London Roosters
2024	(England) Joshua Butler	Leeds Rhinos
2025	(England) Joe Coyd	London Roosters
2026	(England) Rob Hawkins	Halifax Panthers

== Other awards ==
=== Young Player of the Year ===
Year	Winner	Club
1996	(Wales) Keiron Cunningham	St. Helens
1997	(Wales) Lee Briers	Warrington Wolves
1998	(England) Lee Gilmour	Wigan Warriors
1999	(England) Leon Pryce	Bradford Bulls
2000	(England) Stuart Fielden	Bradford Bulls
2001	(England) Rob Burrow	Leeds Rhinos
2002	(England) Richard Horne	Hull F.C.
2003	(England) Gareth Hock	Wigan Warriors
2004	(England) Shaun Briscoe	Hull F.C.
2005	(England) Richard Whiting	Hull F.C.
2006	(England) James Graham	St. Helens
2007	(England) Sam Burgess	Bradford Bulls
2008	(England) Joe Westerman	Castleford Tigers
2009	(England) Sam Tomkins	Wigan Warriors
2010	(England) Sam Tomkins	Wigan Warriors
2011	(England) Jonny Lomax	St. Helens
2012	(England) Zak Hardaker	Leeds Rhinos
2013	(England) Ben Crooks	Hull F.C.
2014	(England) Daryl Clark	Castleford Tigers
2015	(England) George Williams	Wigan Warriors
2016	(England) Tom Johnstone	Wakefield Trinity
2017	(England) Oliver Gildart	Wigan Warriors
2018	(England) Jake Trueman	Castleford Tigers
2019	(England) Matty Lees	St. Helens
2020	(England) Harry Newman	Leeds Rhinos
2021	(England) Jack Welsby	St. Helens
2022	(England) Jack Welsby	St. Helens
2023	(England) Josh Thewlis	Warrington Wolves
2024	(England) Junior Nsemba	Wigan Warriors
2025	(England) Harry Robertson	St. Helens
2026	(England) Harry Robertson	St. Helens

=== Coach of the Year ===
Year	Nat	Winner	Club
2009	Australia	Nathan Brown	Huddersfield Giants
2010	Australia	Michael Maguire	Wigan Warriors
2011	Australia	Trent Robinson	Catalans Dragons
2012	Australia	Mick Potter	Bradford Bulls
2013	England	Paul Anderson	Huddersfield Giants
2014	England	Daryl Powell	Castleford Tigers
2015	England	Brian McDermott	Leeds Rhinos
2016	England	Lee Radford	Hull F.C.
2017	England	Daryl Powell	Castleford Tigers
2018	England	Shaun Wane	Wigan Warriors
2019	Australia	Justin Holbrook	St. Helens
2020	Papua New Guinea	Adrian Lam	Wigan Warriors
2021	England	Steve McNamara	Catalans Dragons
2022	England	Matt Peet	Wigan Warriors
2023	Papua New Guinea	Adrian Lam	Leigh Leopards
2024	Australia	Willie Peters	Hull KR
2025	Australia	Willie Peters	Hull KR
2026	England	Matt Peet	Wigan Warriors

=== Women's Coach of the Year ===
Year	Nat	Winner	Club
2025	England	Denis Betts	Wigan Warriors
2026	England	Denis Betts	Wigan Warriors

=== Top Try Scorer ===
Year	Winner	Club	Tries
1996	(England) Paul Newlove	St. Helens	28
1997	(New Zealand) Nigel Vagana	Warrington Wolves	17
1998	(England) Anthony Sullivan	St. Helens	20
1999	(Tonga) Toa Kohe-Love	Warrington Wolves	25
2000	(England) Sean Long (England) Tommy Martyn	St. Helens	22
2001	(England) Kris Radlinski	Wigan Warriors	27
2002	(Australia) Dennis Moran	London Broncos	22
2003	(Australia) Dennis Moran	London Broncos	24
2004	(Tonga) Lesley Vainikolo	Bradford Bulls	36
2005	(England) Mark Calderwood	Leeds Rhinos	27
2006	(Australia) Justin Murphy	Catalans Dragons	25
2007	(Samoa) Henry Fa'afili	Warrington Wolves	21
2008	(England) Ade Gardner	St. Helens	26
2009	(England) Ryan Hall	Leeds Rhinos	29
2010	(Republic of Ireland) Pat Richards	Wigan Warriors	29
2011	(England) Ryan Hall (England) Sam Tomkins	Leeds Rhinos; Wigan Warriors	28
2012	(England) Josh Charnley	Wigan Warriors	31
2013	(England) Josh Charnley	Wigan Warriors	33
2014	(Australia) Joel Monaghan	Warrington Wolves	28
2015	(England) Jermaine McGillvary	Huddersfield Giants	27
2016	(New Zealand) Denny Solomona	Castleford Tigers	40
2017	(England) Greg Eden	Castleford Tigers	38
2018	(Australia) Ben Barba	St. Helens	28
2019	(England) Tommy Makinson	St. Helens	23
2020	(England) Ash Handley	Leeds Rhinos	14
2021	(Australia) Ken Sio	Salford Red Devils	19
2022	(Australia) Bevan French	Wigan Warriors	31
2023	(England) Tom Johnstone (Lebanon) Abbas Miski	Catalans Dragons; Wigan Warriors	27
2024	(England) Liam Marshall	Wigan Warriors	27

=== Top Points Scorer ===
Year	Winner	Club	Points
1996	(England) Bobbie Goulding	St. Helens	257
1997	(England) Andrew Farrell	Wigan Warriors	243
1998	(Wales) Iestyn Harris	Leeds Rhinos	255
1999	(Wales) Iestyn Harris	Leeds Rhinos	325
2000	(England) Sean Long	St. Helens	390
2001	(England) Andrew Farrell	Wigan Warriors	388
2002	(England) Paul Deacon	Bradford Bulls	301
2003	(England) Paul Deacon	Bradford Bulls	286
2004	(England) Kevin Sinfield	Leeds Rhinos	277
2005	(England) Paul Deacon	Bradford Bulls	322
2006	(England) Jamie Lyon	St. Helens	316
2007	(Republic of Ireland) Pat Richards	Wigan Warriors	248
2008	(Republic of Ireland) Pat Richards	Wigan Warriors	269
2009	(Republic of Ireland) Pat Richards	Wigan Warriors	252
2010	(Republic of Ireland) Pat Richards	Wigan Warriors	288
2011	(England) Jamie Foster	St. Helens	330
2012	(Australia) Scott Dureau	Catalans Dragons	281
2013	(Scotland) Danny Brough	Huddersfield Giants	208
2014	(England) Marc Sneyd	Castleford Tigers	224
2015	(England) Luke Gale	Castleford Tigers	247
2016	(England) Luke Gale	Castleford Tigers	262
2017	(England) Luke Gale	Castleford Tigers	317
2018	(England) Danny Richardson	St Helens	296
2019	(Scotland) Lachlan Coote	St Helens	259
2020	(Scotland) Lachlan Coote	St Helens	152
2021	(Australia) James Maloney	Catalans Dragons	221
2022	(England) Tommy Makinson & Mark Sneyd	St Helens / Salford	242
2023	(England) Stefan Ratchford	Warrington Wolves	200
2024	(England) Mikey Lewis	Hull KR	216

=== Top Metre Maker ===
Year	Winner	Club	Metres
2003	(Australia) Craig Greenhill	Hull F.C.	3,594
2004	(Greece) Michael Korkidas	Wakefield Trinity	4,084
2005	(England) Terry O'Connor	Widnes Vikings	4,104
2006	(Australia) Danny Nutley	Castleford Tigers	3,372
2007	(England) James Roby	St. Helens	3,303
2008	(England) James Graham	St. Helens	3,774
2009	(England) James Graham	St. Helens	4,752
2010	(England) James Graham	St. Helens	4,036
2011	(England) James Roby	St. Helens	5,000
2012	(England) James Roby	St. Helens	3,971
2013	(England) Jamie Peacock	Leeds Rhinos	4,040
2014	(England) Matty Russell	Warrington Wolves	3,546
2015	(England) Alex Walmsley	St. Helens	4,092
2016	(England) Chris Hill	Warrington Wolves	3,983
2017	(England) Alex Walmsley	St. Helens	4,256
2018	(Tonga) Bill Tupou	Wakefield Trinity	4,114
2019	(England) Tommy Makinson	St. Helens	3,803
2020	(England) Ash Handley	Leeds Rhinos	2,541
2021	(England) Tom Davies	Catalans Dragons	3,332
2022	(England) Ash Handley	Leeds Rhinos	3,646
2023	(Australia) Tom Amone	Leigh Leopards	3,467
2024	(Australia) Matthew Dufty	Warrington Wolves	4,234

=== Hit Man ===
The player making most tackles in the regular season.

Year	Winner	Club	Tackles
2009	(England) Malcolm Alker	Salford Red Devils	981
2010	(Australia) Dallas Johnson	Catalans Dragons	1,106
2011	(England) Danny Houghton	Hull F.C.	1,060
2012	(England) Danny Washbrook	Wakefield Trinity Wildcats	991
2013	(England) Danny Houghton	Hull F.C.	1,179
2015	(England) James Roby	St. Helens	1,054
2016	(England) Danny Houghton	Hull F.C.	1,359
2017	(England) Danny Houghton	Hull F.C.	1,123
2018	(England) Paul McShane	Castleford Tigers	1,160
2019	(England) Danny Houghton	Hull F.C.	1,259
2020	(England) Michael Lawrence	Huddersfield Giants	749
2021	(England) Joe Shorrocks	Wigan Warriors	833
2022	(England) Danny Houghton	Hull F.C.	1,031
2023	(Australia) Luke Yates	Huddersfield Giants	1,027
2024	(Australia) Cameron Smith	Leeds Rhinos	992

=== Club of the Year ===
Year	Club
2009	Huddersfield Giants
2010	Wigan Warriors
2011	Huddersfield Giants
2012	Wigan Warriors
2013	St. Helens
2014	Widnes Vikings
2015	Leeds Rhinos
2016	Hull F.C.
2017	Castleford Tigers
2018	Warrington Wolves

- The Mike Gregory Spirit of Rugby League Award - Both players and non-players are eligible to receive the award, which will be judged by a panel from the governing body.
- Fairplay Index Award for Super League
- The Community Player of the year

=== Special awards ===
- The ‘200 Club’ - retiring players who have played in over 200 games.

== See also ==
- Dally M Medal
- Lance Todd Trophy
- Harry Sunderland Trophy
- Albert Goldthorpe Medal
- Woman of Steel
