= Rugby League World =

British sports magazine (1976-)

- Editor: Lorraine Marsden
- Categories: Sport, Rugby league
- Frequency: Monthly
- Circulation: 307,367 (2015)
- Publisher: Martyn Sadler
- First issue: May, 1976
- Company: League Publications
- Country: United Kingdom
- Based in: Brighouse
- Language: English
- Website: totalrl.com
- ISSN: 1466-0105

Rugby League World is a rugby league magazine published monthly in the United Kingdom. It was launched in May 1976 as Open Rugby, and the name was changed in 1999. The magazine is owned by League Publications Ltd who also publish the weekly newspaper Rugby Leaguer & League Express and the annual Gillette Rugby League Yearbook.

== History ==
Rugby League World began life in May 1976 as Open Rugby, founded by Harry Edgar, who published and edited the title until July 1998 when it was sold to League Publications Ltd. Graham Clay then took over as editor, and oversaw the change of title to Rugby League World in March 1999.

A short-lived Australian edition was launched and ran for 7 issues, between March and September 2002. In 2011 an Apple iPad and Android edition of the magazine was launched.

== List of editors ==
Open Rugby

- Harry Edgar - May 1976 to July 1998
- Graham Clay - August 1998 to February 1999

Rugby League World

- Graham Clay - March 1999 to February 2002
- Tony Hannan - March 2002 to March 2004
- Tim Butcher - April 2004 to March 2007
- Richard de la Riviere - April 2007 to January 2010
- John Drake - February 2010 to March 2013
- Gareth Walker - March 2013 to March 2015
- Joe Whitley - March 2015 to August 2016
- John Drake - August 2016 to February 2018
- Doug Thomson - February 2018 to June 2018
- Matthew Shaw - July 2018 to February 2019
- Alex Davis - February 2019 to May 2020 (suspended due to Covid-19)
- Lorraine Marsden - February 2022 to present

== Golden Boot Award ==
In 1985, Open Rugby created the Golden Boot Award, to be given annually to the best player of the year, as chosen by a ballot of international rugby league writers and broadcasters.

The rights to the award was purchased in 2017.

== Sponsorships ==
In 2002 Rugby League World Magazine sponsored the Great Britain team against Australia in the first Test Match played in Sydney for a decade, and has also sponsored the England team in the European Nations Cup.

== See also ==
- Rugby Leaguer & League Express
