= Super League Dream Team =

Annual rugby league all-star team from the Super League competition

The Super League Dream Team is an annually-selected rugby league All Star Team consisting of the players deemed to have been the best in their respective positions in the Super League competition. The team is selected by a panel of journalists and broadcasters at the end of each season.

The inaugural Dream Team was selected in 1996, the competition's first season. The team is traditionally selected following the completion of the regular season, and so does not take play-off matches into account.

== 1996 ==
	Player	Team	Appearance
1	(England) Gary Connolly	Wigan Warriors	1
2	(England) Jason Robinson	Wigan Warriors	1
3	(Samoa) Va'aiga Tuigamala	Wigan Warriors	1
4	(England) Paul Newlove	St. Helens	1
5	(Wales) Anthony Sullivan	St. Helens	1
6	(New Zealand) Henry Paul	Wigan Warriors	1
7	(England) Bobbie Goulding	St. Helens	1
8	(Samoa) Apollo Perelini	St. Helens	1
9	(Wales) Keiron Cunningham	St. Helens	1
10	(Ireland) Terry O'Connor	Wigan Warriors	1
11	(Australia) Peter Gill	London Broncos	1
12	(England) Paul Sculthorpe	Warrington Wolves	1
13	(England) Andrew Farrell †	Wigan Warriors	1

- † indicates that year's Man of Steel.

== 1997 ==
	Player	Team	Appearance
1	(England) Stuart Spruce	Bradford Bulls	1
2	(England) Jason Robinson	Wigan Warriors	2
3	(Australia) Danny Peacock	Bradford Bulls	1
4	(England) Alan Hunte	St. Helens	1
5	(Wales) Anthony Sullivan	St. Helens	2
6	(Australia) Graeme Bradley	Bradford Bulls	1
7	(England) Tony Smith	Wigan Warriors	1
8	(England) Paul Broadbent	Sheffield Eagles	1
9	(England) James Lowes †	Bradford Bulls	1
10	(Australia) Tony Mestrov	Wigan Warriors	1
11	(Australia) Peter Gill	London Broncos	2
12	(England) Mike Forshaw	Bradford Bulls	1
13	(England) Andrew Farrell	Wigan Warriors	2

- † indicates that year's Man of Steel.

== 1998 ==
	Player	Team	Appearance
1	(England) Kris Radlinski	Wigan Warriors	1
2	(England) Jason Robinson	Wigan Warriors	3
3	(England) Gary Connolly	Wigan Warriors	2
4	(Australia) Brad Godden	Leeds Rhinos	1
5	(Wales) Anthony Sullivan	St. Helens	3
6	(Wales) Iestyn Harris †	Leeds Rhinos	1
7	(Australia) Gavin Clinch	Halifax	1
8	(Scotland) Dale Laughton	Sheffield Eagles	1
9	(Australia) Robbie McCormack	Wigan Warriors	1
10	(Australia) Tony Mestrov	Wigan Warriors	2
11	(United States) Steele Retchless	London Broncos	1
12	(England) Adrian Morley	Leeds Rhinos	1
13	(England) Andrew Farrell	Wigan Warriors	3

- † indicates that year's Man of Steel.

== 1999 ==
	Player	Team	Appearance
1	(England) Kris Radlinski	Wigan Warriors	2
2	(England) Jason Robinson	Wigan Warriors	4
3	(England) Gary Connolly	Wigan Warriors	3
4	(England) Paul Newlove	St. Helens	2
5	(Scotland) Matt Daylight	Gateshead Thunder	1
6	(Wales) Iestyn Harris	Leeds Rhinos	2
7	(Australia) Willie Peters	Gateshead Thunder	1
8	(England) Dean Sampson	Castleford Tigers	1
9	(England) James Lowes	Bradford Bulls	2
10	(England) Barrie McDermott	Leeds Rhinos	2
11	(England) Chris Joynt	St. Helens	1
12	(England) Adrian Morley	Leeds Rhinos	2
13	(Australia) Adrian Vowles †	Castleford Tigers	1

- † indicates that year's Man of Steel.

== 2000 ==
	Player	Team	Appearance
1	(England) Kris Radlinski	Wigan Warriors	3
2	(England) Jason Robinson	Wigan Warriors	5
3	(Australia) Steve Renouf	Wigan Warriors	1
4	(Ireland) Michael Eagar	Castleford Tigers	1
5	(Australia) Graham Mackay	Leeds Rhinos	1
6	(Ireland) Tommy Martyn	St. Helens	1
7	(England) Sean Long †	St. Helens	1
8	(England) Stuart Fielden	Bradford Bulls	1
9	(Wales) Keiron Cunningham	St. Helens	2
10	(Ireland) Terry O'Connor	Wigan Warriors	2
11	(England) Jamie Peacock	Bradford Bulls	1
12	(England) Denis Betts	Wigan Warriors	1
13	(England) Andrew Farrell	Wigan Warriors	4

- † indicates that year's Man of Steel.

== 2001 ==
	Player	Team	Appearance
1	(England) Kris Radlinski	Wigan Warriors	4
2	(Tonga) Tevita Vaikona	Bradford Bulls	1
3	(Australia) Tonie Carroll	Leeds Rhinos	1
4	(Australia) Steve Renouf	Wigan Warriors	2
5	(Australia) Brett Dallas	Wigan Warriors	1
6	(England) Paul Sculthorpe †	St. Helens	2
7	(Papua New Guinea) Adrian Lam	Wigan Warriors	1
8	(Australia) David Fairleigh	St. Helens	1
9	(Wales) Keiron Cunningham	St. Helens	3
10	(Ireland) Terry O'Connor	Wigan Warriors	3
11	(Australia) David Furner	Wigan Warriors	1
12	(England) Jamie Peacock	Bradford Bulls	2
13	(England) Andrew Farrell	Wigan Warriors	5

- † indicates that year's Man of Steel.

== 2002 ==
	Player	Team	Appearance
1	(England) Kris Radlinski	Wigan Warriors	5
2	(Tonga) Tevita Vaikona	Bradford Bulls	2
3	(England) Martin Gleeson	St. Helens	1
4	(England) Keith Senior	Leeds Rhinos	1
5	(Australia) Darren Albert	St. Helens	1
6	(England) Danny Orr	Castleford Tigers	1
7	(Papua New Guinea) Adrian Lam	Wigan Warriors	2
8	(Ireland) Terry O'Connor	Wigan Warriors	4
9	(Wales) Keiron Cunningham	St. Helens	4
10	(England) Stuart Fielden	Bradford Bulls	2
11	(New Zealand) Michael Smith	Castleford Tigers	1
12	(England) Jamie Peacock	Bradford Bulls	3
13	(England) Paul Sculthorpe †	St. Helens	3

- † indicates that year's Man of Steel.

== 2003 ==
	Player	Team	Appearance
1	(England) Gary Connolly	Leeds Rhinos	4
2	(New Zealand) Lesley Vainikolo	Bradford Bulls	1
3	(England) Gareth Ellis	Wakefield Trinity Wildcats	1
4	(England) Keith Senior	Leeds Rhinos	2
5	(Ireland) Brian Carney	Wigan Warriors	1
6	(Australia) Graham Appo	Warrington Wolves	1
7	(Papua New Guinea) Adrian Lam	Wigan Warriors	3
8	(New Zealand) Craig Smith	Wigan Warriors	1
9	(England) Terry Newton	Wigan Warriors	1
10	(England) Andy Lynch	Castleford Tigers	1
11	(England) Jamie Peacock †	Bradford Bulls	4
12	(Australia) Matt Adamson	Leeds Rhinos	1
13	(England) Andrew Farrell	Wigan Warriors	6

- † indicates that year's Man of Steel.

== 2004 ==
	Player	Team	Appearance
1	(England) Shaun Briscoe	Hull F.C.	1
2	(New Zealand) Lesley Vainikolo	Bradford Bulls	2
3	(England) Keith Senior	Leeds Rhinos	3
4	(Australia) Sid Domic	Wakefield Trinity Wildcats	1
5	(Papua New Guinea) Marcus Bai	Leeds Rhinos	1
6	(England) Danny McGuire	Leeds Rhinos	1
7	(England) Richard Horne	Hull F.C.	1
8	(England) Andrew Farrell †	Wigan Warriors	7
9	(England) Matt Diskin	Leeds Rhinos	1
10	(England) Paul King	Hull F.C.	1
11	(New Zealand) Ali Lauitiiti	Leeds Rhinos	1
12	(New Zealand) David Solomona	Wakefield Trinity Wildcats	1
13	(England) Paul Sculthorpe	St. Helens	4

- † indicates that year's Man of Steel.

== 2005 ==
	Player	Team	Appearance
1	(England) Paul Wellens	St. Helens	1
2	(England) Mark Calderwood	Leeds Rhinos	1
3	(Australia) Jamie Lyon †	St. Helens	1
4	(England) Martin Gleeson	St. Helens	2
5	(Australia) Darren Albert	St. Helens	2
6	(England) Paul Cooke	Hull F.C.	1
7	(England) Rob Burrow	Leeds Rhinos	1
8	(England) Jamie Thackray	Hull F.C.	1
9	(Wales) Keiron Cunningham	St. Helens	5
10	(England) Paul Anderson	St. Helens	1
11	(England) Jamie Peacock	Bradford Bulls	5
12	(New Zealand) Ali Lauitiiti	Leeds Rhinos	2
13	(England) Kevin Sinfield	Leeds Rhinos	1

- † indicates that year's Man of Steel.

== 2006 ==
	Player	Team	Appearance
1	(England) Paul Wellens †	St. Helens	2
2	(Australia) Justin Murphy	Catalans Dragons	1
3	(Australia) Jamie Lyon	St. Helens	2
4	(England) Kirk Yeaman	Hull F.C.	1
5	(England) David Hodgson	Salford City Reds	1
6	(England) Danny McGuire	Leeds Rhinos	2
7	(England) Sean Long	St. Helens	2
8	(England) Stuart Fielden	Wigan Warriors	3
9	(Wales) Keiron Cunningham	St. Helens	6
10	(Australia) Danny Nutley	Castleford Tigers	1
11	(England) Gareth Ellis	Leeds Rhinos	2
12	(England) Jon Wilkin	St. Helens	1
13	(England) Kevin Sinfield	Leeds Rhinos	2

- † indicates that year's Man of Steel.

== 2007 ==
	Player	Team	Appearance
1	(England) Paul Wellens	St. Helens	3
2	(England) Kevin Penny	Warrington Wolves	1
3	(Australia) Adam Mogg	Catalans Dragons	1
4	(Australia) Jason Demetriou	Wakefield Trinity Wildcats	1
5	(Australia) Scott Donald	Leeds Rhinos	1
6	(Australia) Trent Barrett	Wigan Warriors	1
7	(England) Rob Burrow	Leeds Rhinos	2
8	(England) Nick Fozzard	St. Helens	1
9	(England) James Roby †	St. Helens	1
10	(England) Jamie Peacock	Leeds Rhinos	6
11	(England) Gareth Ellis	Leeds Rhinos	3
12	(Australia) Glenn Morrison	Bradford Bulls	1
13	(England) Stephen Wild	Huddersfield Giants	1

- † indicates that year's Man of Steel.

== 2008 ==
	Player	Team	Appearance
1	(Australia) Clint Greenshields	Catalans Dragons	1
2	(Australia) Scott Donald	Leeds Rhinos	2
3	(Australia) Matthew Gidley	St. Helens	1
4	(Samoa) George Carmont	Wigan Warriors	1
5	(England) Ade Gardner	St. Helens	1
6	(England) Leon Pryce	St. Helens	1
7	(England) Rob Burrow	Leeds Rhinos	3
8	(England) James Graham †	St. Helens	1
9	(Wales) Keiron Cunningham	St. Helens	7
10	(England) Jamie Peacock	Leeds Rhinos	7
11	(England) Gareth Ellis	Leeds Rhinos	4
12	(England) Ben Westwood	Warrington Wolves	1
13	(England) Kevin Sinfield	Leeds Rhinos	3

- † indicates that year's Man of Steel.

== 2009 ==
The 2009 Super League Dream Team was announced on 14 September 2009.

	Player	Team	Appearance
1	(Australia) Brett Hodgson †	Huddersfield Giants	1
2	(England) Peter Fox	Hull Kingston Rovers	1
3	(Australia) Matthew Gidley	St. Helens	1
4	(England) Keith Senior	Leeds Rhinos	4
5	(England) Ryan Hall	Leeds Rhinos	1
6	(England) Sam Tomkins	Wigan Warriors	1
7	(Australia) Michael Dobson	Hull Kingston Rovers	1
8	(England) Adrian Morley	Warrington Wolves	3
9	(England) Scott Moore	Huddersfield Giants	1
10	(England) Jamie Peacock	Leeds Rhinos	8
11	(Australia) Ben Galea	Hull Kingston Rovers	1
12	(United States) Clint Newton	Hull Kingston Rovers	1
13	(England) Kevin Sinfield	Leeds Rhinos	4

- † indicates that year's Man of Steel.

== 2010 ==
On 6 September 2010, the Dream Team of Super League XV was announced. The team boasted four players from league leaders Wigan Warriors; including first appearances for Pat Richards, Sean O'Loughlin and Joel Tomkins, with the latter's brother Sam appearing for the second successive year. Three players came from second and third placed St. Helens and Warrington Wolves; those being Paul Wellens, James Roby and James Graham (St Helens) and Matt King, Adrian Morley ad Ben Westwood (Warrington). Two players, left wing partnership Keith Senior and Ryan Hall, were selected from Leeds Rhinos, and the team was completed by Michael Dobson of Hull Kingston Rovers. Only three of the thirteen (Richards, King and Dobson) in 2010 were imports, one of whom (Richards) had switched his allegiance to Ireland in 2008. 2010 also proved to be the first time a set of brothers (the Tomkins') have appeared in the same Dream Team.

	Player	Team	Appearance
1	(England) Paul Wellens	St. Helens	4
2	(Ireland) Pat Richards †	Wigan Warriors	1
3	(Australia) Matt King	Warrington Wolves	1
4	(England) Keith Senior	Leeds Rhinos	5
5	(England) Ryan Hall	Leeds Rhinos	2
6	(England) Sam Tomkins	Wigan Warriors	2
7	(Australia) Michael Dobson	Hull Kingston Rovers	2
8	(England) Adrian Morley	Warrington Wolves	4
9	(England) James Roby	St. Helens	2
10	(England) James Graham	St. Helens	2
11	(England) Ben Westwood	Warrington Wolves	2
12	(England) Joel Tomkins	Wigan Warriors	1
13	(England) Sean O'Loughlin	Wigan Warriors	1

- † indicates that year's Man of Steel.

== 2011 ==
	Player	Team	Appearance
1	(England) Sam Tomkins	Wigan Warriors	3
2	(England) Tom Briscoe	Hull F.C.	1
3	(England) Kirk Yeaman	Hull F.C.	2
4	(Samoa) George Carmont	Wigan Warriors	2
5	(Australia) Joel Monaghan	Warrington Wolves	1
6	(New Zealand) Rangi Chase †	Castleford Tigers	1
7	(Australia) Scott Dureau	Catalans Dragons	1
8	(England) James Graham	St. Helens	3
9	(England) James Roby	St. Helens	3
10	(England) Garreth Carvell	Warrington Wolves	1
11	(England) Ben Westwood	Warrington Wolves	3
12	(Australia) Steve Menzies	Catalans Dragons	1
13	(England) Sean O'Loughlin	Wigan Warriors	2

- † indicates that year's Man of Steel.

== 2012 ==
On 10 September 2012, the Dream Team for Super League XVII was announced. The team consisted of six players from league leaders Wigan Warriors, three from league runners-up Warrington Wolves, two from Catalans Dragons and one each from St Helens R.F.C. and Super League XVI winners Leeds Rhinos. Six players (Ryan Atkins, Rémi Casty, Josh Charnley, Brett Finch, Chris Hill and Gareth Hock) made their debuts in the Dream Team, while three players (James Roby, Sam Tomkins and Ben Westwood) were selected for the fourth time, with Tomkins appearing for the fourth year in a row.

	Player	Team	Appearance
1	(England) Sam Tomkins †	Wigan Warriors	4
2	(England) Josh Charnley	Wigan Warriors	1
3	(Samoa) George Carmont	Wigan Warriors	3
4	(England) Ryan Atkins	Warrington Wolves	1
5	(England) Ryan Hall	Leeds Rhinos	3
6	(Australia) Brett Finch	Wigan Warriors	1
7	(Australia) Scott Dureau	Catalans Dragons	2
8	(England) Chris Hill	Warrington Wolves	1
9	(England) James Roby	St. Helens	4
10	(France) Rémi Casty	Catalans Dragons	1
11	(England) Ben Westwood	Warrington Wolves	4
12	(England) Gareth Hock	Wigan Warriors	1
13	(England) Sean O'Loughlin	Wigan Warriors	3

- † indicates that year's Man of Steel.

== 2013 ==
On 9 September 2013, the Super League XVIII Dream Team was announced at Huddersfield's John Smith's Stadium. The team was virtually made up of English players, with the sole exception of Danny Brough, who represented Scotland at international level, although was born in Dewsbury in West Yorkshire. Brough was also one of five Huddersfield Giants players in the Dream Team, which acknowledged the club winning the League Leaders' Shield. The other Huddersfield players selected were Eorl Crabtree, Leroy Cudjoe, Brett Ferres and Shaun Lunt.

Wigan Warriors had four players, three of whom, Josh Charnley, Sean O'Loughlin and Sam Tomkins, were the only members of the 2012 Dream Team to be selected in 2013 with Tomkins now selected in the Dream Team five years in a row. The other Wigan player selected was Matty Smith

The remainder of the Dream Team consisted of two players from Hull F.C. (Ben Crooks and Tom Lineham) and one each from Leeds Rhinos (Jamie Peacock) and Wakefield Trinity Wildcats (Danny Kirmond), who were the only team to have a player in the Dream Team but not be involved in the play-offs. Despite finishing second in the table, no players from Warrington Wolves were selected.

	Player	Team	Appearance
1	(England) Sam Tomkins	Wigan Warriors	5
2	(England) Josh Charnley	Wigan Warriors	2
3	(England) Leroy Cudjoe	Huddersfield Giants	1
4	(England) Ben Crooks	Hull F.C.	1
5	(England) Tom Lineham	Hull F.C.	1
6	(Scotland) Danny Brough †	Huddersfield Giants	1
7	(England) Matty Smith	Wigan Warriors	1
8	(England) Eorl Crabtree	Huddersfield Giants	1
9	(England) Shaun Lunt	Huddersfield Giants	1
10	(England) Jamie Peacock	Leeds Rhinos	9
11	(England) Brett Ferres	Huddersfield Giants	1
12	(England) Danny Kirmond	Wakefield Trinity Wildcats	1
13	(England) Sean O'Loughlin	Wigan Warriors	4

- † indicates that year's Man of Steel.

== 2014 ==
The 2014 Dream Team was the first to be made up entirely of English players. For the first time since 2010 Sam Tomkins did not make an appearance and there were debuts for Zak Hardaker, Tommy Makinson, Michael Shenton, Kallum Watkins, Kevin Brown, Daryl Clark and Carl Ablett. Jamie Peacock made a record tenth appearance.

	Player	Team	Appearance
1	(England) Zak Hardaker	Leeds Rhinos	1
2	(England) Tommy Makinson	St. Helens	1
3	(England) Kallum Watkins	Leeds Rhinos	1
4	(England) Michael Shenton	Castleford Tigers	1
5	(England) Ryan Hall	Leeds Rhinos	4
6	(England) Kevin Brown	Widnes Vikings	1
7	(England) Matty Smith	Wigan Warriors	2
8	(England) Chris Hill	Warrington Wolves	2
9	(England) Daryl Clark †	Castleford Tigers	1
10	(England) Jamie Peacock	Leeds Rhinos	10
11	(England) Elliott Whitehead	Catalans Dragons	1
12	(England) Carl Ablett	Leeds Rhinos	1
13	(England) Sean O'Loughlin	Wigan Warriors	5

- † indicates that year's Man of Steel.

== 2015 ==
Jamie Peacock made a record and 11th and final appearance.

	Player	Team	Appearance
1	(England) Zak Hardaker †	Leeds Rhinos	2
2	(England) Jermaine McGillvary	Huddersfield Giants	1
3	(England) Kallum Watkins	Leeds Rhinos	2
4	(England) Michael Shenton	Castleford Tigers	2
5	(England) Joe Burgess	Wigan Warriors	1
6	(Scotland) Danny Brough	Huddersfield Giants	2
7	(England) Luke Gale	Castleford Tigers	1
8	(England) Alex Walmsley	St. Helens	1
9	(England) James Roby	St. Helens	5
10	(England) Jamie Peacock	Leeds Rhinos	11
11	(Cook Islands) Zeb Taia	Catalans Dragons	1
12	(England) Liam Farrell	Wigan Warriors	1
13	(Australia) Adam Cuthbertson	Leeds Rhinos	1

- † indicates that year's Man of Steel.

== 2016 ==
The 2016 Dream Team featured nine players making their first appearance.

	Player	Team	Appearance
1	(England) Jamie Shaul	Hull F.C.	1
2	(New Zealand) Denny Solomona	Castleford Tigers	1
3	(England) Ryan Atkins	Warrington Wolves	2
4	(Tonga) Mahe Fonua	Hull F.C.	1
5	(England) Dominic Manfredi	Wigan Warriors	1
6	(Australia) Kurt Gidley	Warrington Wolves	1
7	(England) Luke Gale	Castleford Tigers	2
8	(England) Chris Hill	Warrington Wolves	3
9	(England) Danny Houghton†	Hull F.C.	1
10	(England) Scott Taylor	Hull F.C.	1
11	(England) Ben Currie	Warrington Wolves	1
12	(Italy) Mark Minichiello	Hull F.C.	1
13	(England) Gareth Ellis	Hull F.C.	5

- † indicates that year's Man of Steel.

== 2017 ==
The 2017 Dream Team featured eight players making their first appearance. Six players were selected from League Leaders Castleford Tigers.

	Player	Team	Appearance
1	(England) Zak Hardaker	Castleford Tigers	3
2	(England) Greg Eden	Castleford Tigers	1
3	(England) Michael Shenton	Castleford Tigers	3
4	(England) Mark Percival	St. Helens	1
5	(Tonga) Mahe Fonua	Hull F.C.	2
6	(Australia) Albert Kelly	Hull F.C.	1
7	(England) Luke Gale †	Castleford Tigers	3
8	(Australia) Grant Millington	Castleford Tigers	1
9	(Australia) Matt Parcell	Leeds Rhinos	1
10	(New Zealand) Sebastine Ikahihifo	Huddersfield Giants	1
11	(Tonga) Ben Murdoch-Masila	Salford Red Devils	1
12	(England) Mike McMeeken	Castleford Tigers	1
13	(England) Sean O'Loughlin	Wigan Warriors	6

== 2018 ==
The 2018 Dream Team featured eight players making their first appearance. Seven players were selected from League Leaders St Helens.

	Player	Team	Appearance
1	(Australia) Ben Barba †	St. Helens	1
2	(England) Thomas Makinson	St. Helens	2
3	(England) Mark Percival	St. Helens	2
4	(Tonga) Bill Tupou	Wakefield Trinity	1
5	(Scotland) Tom Johnstone	Wakefield Trinity	1
6	(England) Jonny Lomax	St. Helens	1
7	(England) Danny Richardson	St. Helens	1
8	(England) Luke Thompson	St. Helens	1
9	(England) James Roby	St. Helens	6
10	(France) Rémi Casty	Catalans Dragons	2
11	(England) John Bateman	Wigan Warriors	1
12	(England) Matty Ashurst	Wakefield Trinity	1
13	(England) Sean O'Loughlin	Wigan Warriors	7

- † indicates that year's Man of Steel.

== 2019 ==
The 2019 Dream Team featured nine players making their first appearance. League Leaders and Champions St Helens had the most players for any one team with five.

#	Player	Team	Appearance
1	(Scotland) Lachlan Coote	St. Helens	1
2	(England) Thomas Makinson	St. Helens	3
3	(Fiji) Kevin Naiqama	St. Helens	1
4	(Tonga) Konrad Hurrell	Leeds Rhinos	1
5	(England) Ash Handley	Leeds Rhinos	1
6	(Australia) Blake Austin	Warrington Wolves	1
7	(Australia) Jackson Hastings †	Salford Red Devils	1
8	(England) Liam Watts	Castleford Tigers	1
9	(England) Daryl Clark	Warrington Wolves	2
10	(England) Luke Thompson	St. Helens	2
11	(England) Josh Jones	Salford Red Devils	1
12	(England) Liam Farrell	Wigan Warriors	2
13	(Wales) Morgan Knowles	St. Helens	1

- † indicates that year's Man of Steel.

== 2020 ==
The 2020 season was shortened due to the COVID-19 pandemic. The team was selected based on the Man of Steel points totals. St Helens had the most players of any team with three as players from eight different clubs were chosen.

#	Player	Team	Appearance
1	(Australia) Bevan French	Wigan Warriors	1
2	(New Zealand) Krisnan Inu	Salford Red Devils	1
3	(England) Toby King	Warrington Wolves	1
4	(Tonga) Konrad Hurrell	Leeds Rhinos	2
5	(England) Ash Handley	Leeds Rhinos	2
6	(England) Jonny Lomax	St. Helens	2
7	(Australia) Aidan Sezer	Huddersfield Giants	1
8	(England) Mike Cooper	Warrington Wolves	1
9	(England) Paul McShane †	Castleford Tigers	1
10	(England) Alex Walmsley	St. Helens	2
11	(Australia) Kelepi Tanginoa	Wakefield Trinity	1
12	(England) Liam Farrell	Wigan Warriors	3
13	(Wales) Morgan Knowles	St. Helens	2

- † indicates that year's Man of Steel.

== 2021 ==
Second placed St Helens and League Leaders Catalans Dragons dominated the 2021 Dream Team with five and four selections respectively. Sam Tomkins returned after an eight year absence, Hull K.R. had their first representative in a decade and Liam Farrell, Alex Walmsley and Johnny Lomax all retained their places from 2020.

#	Player	Team	Appearance
1	(England) Sam Tomkins †	Catalans Dragons	6
2	(Australia) Ken Sio	Salford Red Devils	1
3	(England) Jack Welsby	St. Helens	1
4	(England) Mark Percival	St. Helens	3
5	(England) Tom Davies	Catalans Dragons	1
6	(England) Jonny Lomax	St. Helens	3
7	(Australia) James Maloney	Catalans Dragons	1
8	(New Zealand) Sam Kasiano	Catalans Dragons	1
9	(England) Kruise Leeming	Leeds Rhinos	1
10	(England) Alex Walmsley	St. Helens	3
11	(Australia) Kane Linnett	Hull Kingston Rovers	1
12	(England) Liam Farrell	Wigan Warriors	4
13	(Wales) Morgan Knowles	St. Helens	3

- † indicates that year's Man of Steel.

== 2022 ==
The 2022 Super League Dream Team was dominated by the North West clubs with League Leaders St Helens having four players, as well as second placed Wigan and sixth placed Salford having three players each. Six players made their first appearance whilst Ken Sio, Jack Welsby, Alex Walmsley, Liam Farrell, and Morgan Knowles retained their places from 2021. Bevan French made his first appearance since 2020 and James Roby made his first appearance since 2018.

#	Player	Team	Appearance
1	(Australia) Jai Field	Wigan Warriors	1
2	(Australia) Bevan French	Wigan Warriors	2
3	(New Zealand) Shaun Kenny-Dowall	Hull Kingston Rovers	1
4	(Samoa) Tim Lafai	Salford Red Devils	1
5	(Australia) Ken Sio	Salford Red Devils	2
6	(England) Jack Welsby	St. Helens	2
7	(Australia) Brodie Croft †	Salford Red Devils	1
8	(England) Alex Walmsley	St. Helens	4
9	(England) James Roby	St. Helens	7
10	(England) Mikolaj Oledzki	Leeds Rhinos	1
11	(England) Chris McQueen	Huddersfield Giants	1
12	(England) Liam Farrell	Wigan Warriors	5
13	(England) Morgan Knowles	St. Helens	4

- † indicates that year's Man of Steel.

== 2023 ==
The 2023 Super League Dream Team was dominated by Leigh Leopards. The newly-promoted side finished fifth and had five players named in the Dream Team. League Leaders Wigan had three players named, while the rest were spread out among five other teams. Six players made their first appearance whilst Jack Welsby, Shaun Kenny-Dowall, Bevan French and Liam Farrell retained their places from 2022. Farrell was named for a fifth successive year, equalling the record set by Sam Tomkins from 2009 to 2013. Josh Charnley made his first appearance since 2013, Kallum Watkins made his first appearance since 2015, and Tom Johnstone made his first appearance since 2018.

#	Player	Team	Appearance
1	(England) Jack Welsby	St Helens	3
2	(England) Josh Charnley	Leigh Leopards	3
3	(New Zealand) Shaun Kenny-Dowall	Hull Kingston Rovers	2
4	(England) Jake Wardle	Wigan Warriors	1
5	(England) Tom Johnstone	Catalans Dragons	2
6	(Australia) Bevan French †	Wigan Warriors	3
7	(Papua New Guinea) Lachlan Lam	Leigh Leopards	1
8	(Australia) Paul Vaughan	Warrington Wolves	1
9	(Papua New Guinea) Edwin Ipape	Leigh Leopards	1
10	(Australia) Tom Amone	Leigh Leopards	1
11	(England) Kallum Watkins	Salford Red Devils	3
12	(England) Liam Farrell	Wigan Warriors	6
13	(Tonga) John Asiata	Leigh Leopards	1

- † indicates that year's Man of Steel.

== 2024 ==
The 2024 Super League Dream Team saw Wigan with the most players named. The Warriors, who retained the League Leaders Shield and Super League title, saw four players named. Third placed Warrington had three players named, regular season and Grand Final runners up Hull KR and 4th placed Salford had two players each named with the field completed by 6th placed St Helens and a Leeds team who missed out on the playoffs. Eleven players made their first appearance whilst Jake Wardle made it consecutive appearances and Luke Thompson made his first appearance since 2019.

#	Player	Team	Appearance
1	(Australia) Matt Dufty	Warrington Wolves	1
2	(England) Matty Ashton	Warrington Wolves	1
3	(Papua New Guinea) Nene McDonald	Salford Red Devils	1
4	(England) Jake Wardle	Wigan Warriors	2
5	(England) Liam Marshall	Wigan Warriors	1
6	(England) Mikey Lewis †	Hull Kingston Rovers	1
7	(England) Marc Sneyd	Salford Red Devils	1
8	(England) Matty Lees	St Helens	1
9	(England) Danny Walker	Warrington Wolves	1
10	(England) Luke Thompson	Wigan Warriors	3
11	(England) Junior Nsemba	Wigan Warriors	1
12	(Papua New Guinea) Rhyse Martin	Leeds Rhinos	1
13	(England) Elliot Minchella	Hull Kingston Rovers	1

- † indicates that year's Man of Steel.

== 2025 ==
Hull KR dominated the 2025 team after an outstanding regular season which saw them win the League Leaders Shield. Mikey Lewis and Liam Marshall retained their places while Morgan Knowles returned after several years to join a select group of players to appear in five dream teams.

#	Player	Team	Appearance
1	(Australia) Jai Field	Wigan Warriors	2
2	(England) Lewis Martin	Hull F.C.	1
3	(New Zealand) Peta Hiku	Hull Kingston Rovers	1
4	(England) Umyla Hanley	Leigh Leopards	1
5	(England) Liam Marshall	Wigan Warriors	2
6	(England) Mikey Lewis	Hull Kingston Rovers	2
7	(England) Jake Connor †	Leeds Rhinos	1
8	(England) Mike McMeeken	Wakefield Trinity	2
9	(England) Jez Litten	Hull Kingston Rovers	1
10	(New Zealand) Herman Ese'ese	Hull F.C.	1
11	(England) Dean Hadley	Hull Kingston Rovers	1
12	(England) James McDonnell	Leeds Rhinos	1
13	(England) Morgan Knowles	St Helens	5

- † indicates that year's Man of Steel.

== 2026 ==
Leeds Rhinos dominated the 2026 team after a strong regular season campaign, Matthieu Jussaume became only the 2nd ever French player to be included and Ben Currie returns after a 10 year absence.

#	Player	Team	Appearance
1	(Australia) Lachie Miller	Leeds Rhinos	1
2	(Fiji) Maika Sivo	Leeds Rhinos	1
3	(England) Ash Handley	Leeds Rhinos	3
4	(England) Umyla Hanley	Leigh Leopards	2
5	(England) Zach Eckersley	Wigan Warriors	1
6	(Australia) Brodie Croft	Leeds Rhinos	2
7	(England) Jake Connor	Leeds Rhinos	2
8	(England) Caleb Hamlin-Uele	Wakefield Trinity	1
9	(England) Brad O'Neill	Wigan Warriors	1
10	(Tonga) Joe Ofahengaue	Leigh Leopards	1
11	(France) Mathieu Jussaume	Toulouse Olympique	1
12	(England) James McDonnell	Leeds Rhinos	2
13	(England) Ben Currie	Warrington Wolves	2

- † indicates that year's Man of Steel.

== Appearances by club and country ==
To date, 18 different clubs have seen players appear in the Dream Team.

	Club	Appearance
1	Wigan Warriors	89
2	St. Helens	77
3	Leeds Rhinos	65
4	Warrington Wolves	26
5	Castleford Tigers	22
6	Hull F.C.	20
7	Bradford Bulls	19
9	Hull Kingston Rovers	15
10=	Catalans Dragons	13
10=	Huddersfield Giants	13
12	Salford Red Devils	12
13	Wakefield Trinity Wildcats	11
14	Leigh Leopards	8
15	London Broncos	3
16=	Sheffield Eagles	2
16=	Gateshead Thunder	2
18=	Halifax	1
18=	Widnes Vikings	1
18=	Toulouse Olympique	1

14 different countries have seen players appear in the Dream Team. Fiji are the latest country to see a player appear with Kevin Naiqama making the team in 2019 for St. Helens.

	Country	Appearance
1	England	252
2	Australia	71
3	New Zealand	17
3	Wales	15
5	Tonga	10
6	Ireland	8
6	Papua New Guinea	8
8	Samoa	7
9	Scotland	6
10	France	3
10	United States	2
10	Fiji	2
13	Italy	1
13	Cook Islands	1

== Players with five or more appearances ==
	Player	Club(s) appeared for	Appearances
1	Jamie Peacock	Bradford, Leeds	11
2=	Andrew Farrell	Wigan	7
2=	Keiron Cunningham	St. Helens	7
2=	Sean O'Loughlin	Wigan	7
2=	James Roby	St. Helens	7
6=	Sam Tomkins	Wigan, Catalans	6
6=	Liam Farrell	Wigan	6
8=	Gareth Ellis	Wakefield, Leeds, Hull F.C.	5
8=	Jason Robinson	Wigan	5
8=	Keith Senior	Leeds	5
8=	Kris Radlinski	Wigan	5
8=	Morgan Knowles	St. Helens	5
