= Rugby Leaguer & League Express =

British weekly newspaper

- Categories: Sport, Rugby league
- Frequency: Weekly
- Founded: 1940s
- Company: League Publications Ltd
- Country: England
- Language: English

Rugby Leaguer & League Express is a weekly newspaper published every Monday in the United Kingdom. Other rugby league titles published by League Publications Ltd include the monthly magazine 'Rugby League World' and the annual 'Rugby League Yearbook'.

It features match reports and pictures from every game played in the Betfred Super League, the Betfred Championship and the Australian National Rugby League (NRL). Coverage of the amateur game is also included, along with local and international rugby league related news.

== History ==
The current incarnation of this publication is a merger of two previously existing titles, 'Rugby Leaguer' which can trace its origins back to the 1940s, and 'League Express', which first appeared on Monday 10 September 1990.

=== League Express ===
In 1990, Martyn Sadler (chairman) and Tim Butcher (managing director) believed that limited coverage of rugby league every Monday morning in the national newspapers had opened a niche market for a specialist rugby league newspaper to be published every Monday. The very first edition of League Express, edited by Mike Rylance, appeared on 10 September 1990. The first six editions of League Express were printed by the Yorkshire Weekly Newspaper Group at their Wakefield printing press, before production was transferred to Bradford, to the Telegraph and Argus press.

At the start of the 1993/94 season Martyn Sadler became the managing editor of League Express. LPL decided to expand its production with a new title – League Express Weekend – edited by Tim Butcher and published each Friday during the season. In the years that followed, the Friday newspaper changed its title to Rugby League Weekend, Super League Week, and then Total Rugby League.

At the end of the 2000 season League Publications Limited decided to convert its Total Rugby League newspaper into an online publication, TotalRL.com, which launched on 1 March 2001 and became one of the world's most popular rugby league sites.

=== Rugby Leaguer & League Express ===
In May 2002, League Publications Limited acquired the 'Rugby Leaguer' newspaper and merged it with League Express to create Rugby Leaguer & League Express.

In 2008, the Albert Goldthorpe Medal, named after Albert Goldthorpe, was created by the newspaper to honour the leading players in the Super League.

=== Staff ===
Editor: Martyn Sadler

Assistant editor: Lorraine Marsden

Senior reporter: Doug Thomson

Production editor: Dan Spencer

Cartoonist: Honor James

== See also ==
- Rugby League World
