= Danny Brough =

England and Scotland international rugby league footballer (born 1983)

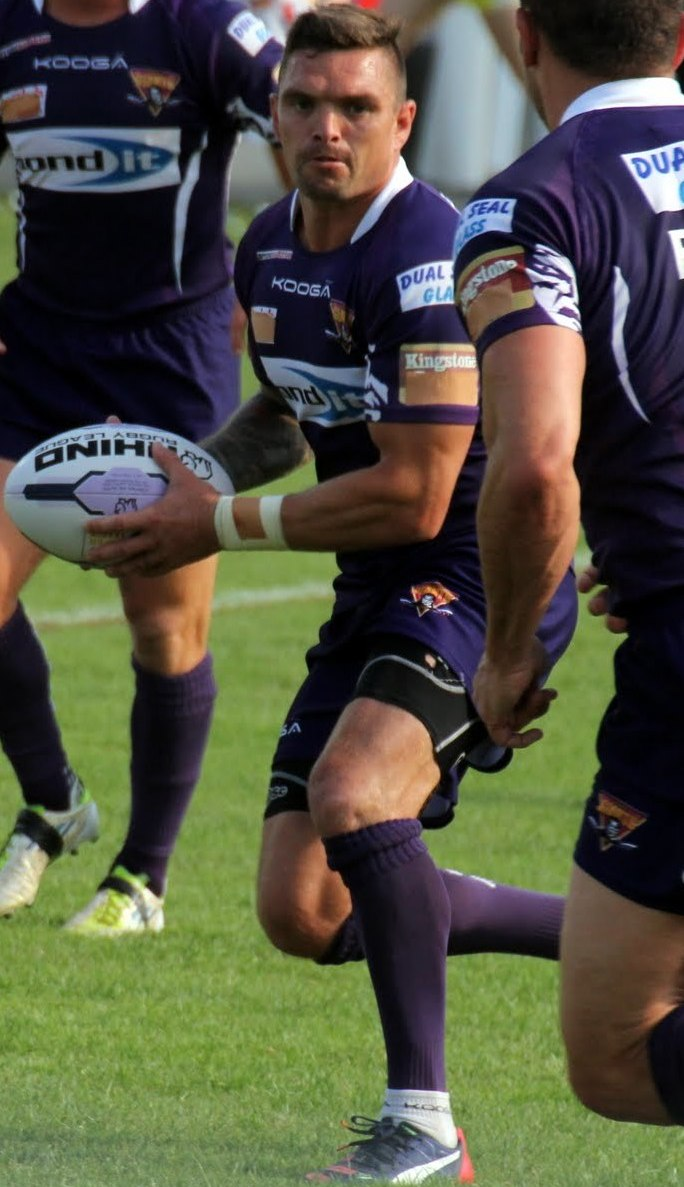

Personal information
- Full name: Daniel Brough
- Born: 15 January 1983 (age 43) Thornhill, West Yorkshire, England
- Height: 5 ft 8 in (1.73 m)
- Weight: 12 st 8 lb (80 kg)

Playing information
- Position: Scrum-half, Stand-off, Hooker
Club
Years	Team	Pld	T	G	FG	P
2002–03	Dewsbury Rams	37	4	33	5	87
2003–04	York City Knights	53	20	265	6	616
2005–06	Hull F.C.	43	3	95	2	204
2006–07	Castleford Tigers	35	12	153	4	358
2008–10	Wakefield Trinity Wildcats	57	19	204	5	489
2010–18	Huddersfield Giants	247	51	793	25	1815
2019–20	Wakefield Trinity	26	2	76	5	165
2021	Bradford Bulls	13	2	48	5	109
	Total	511	113	1667	57	3843
Representative
Years	Team	Pld	T	G	FG	P
2004–17	Scotland	25	4	58	2	134
2012	England	1	0	2	0	4

Coaching information
Club
Years	Team	Gms	W	D	L	W%
2025–26	Huddersfield RUFC	0	0	0	0
- Source: As of 28 June 2026

Danny Brough (born 15 January 1983) is a former professional rugby league footballer who is the head coach of the Huddersfield Rugby Union Club. He played as a stand-off, scrum-half or hooker mainly known for his spell with the town's Rugby League club, Huddersfield Giants where he was a mainstay for a decade and captain of the Giants throughout their most successful modern era spell, during which he became the first player to win the Albert Goldthorpe Medal twice and only the second Giants player to be named Man of Steel after Brett Hodgson in 2009.

Brough started his professional career in 2002 with Dewsbury Rams in the second tier before moving to York City Knights a year later. Brough made his Super League debut in 2005 after signing for Hull F.C., winning the Challenge Cup final with the club in the same season. After spending a season with Castleford Tigers in 2007's National League One, he returned to the Super League with the Wakefield Trinity Wildcats before switching to the Huddersfield Giants in 2010. After a second spell with Wakefield, he finished his career at Bradford Bulls in 2021.

Brough also played at international level for England and Scotland, being eligible to play for the latter through his grandfather, and won a Scottish record 24 caps.

== Background ==
Brough was born in Thornhill, West Yorkshire, England.

== Playing career ==
=== Domestic career ===
==== Dewsbury Rams ====
Brough started his playing career as a junior at Thornhill before signing for Wakefield Trinity at the age of 15. He failed to make a first team appearance for the club and moved to Dewsbury in the Northern Ford Premiership, making his senior début in 2002. Seeking more regular first team opportunities, Brough requested a transfer during the 2003 season, and was subsequently sold to National League Two side York City Knights after two seasons at the Dewsbury Rams.

==== York City Knights ====
In 2004, Brough set new club records at York for most goals scored in a season (178), and most points scored in a season (412), (Note: Both these records stood until 2018 when broken by Connor Robinson (186 goals and 420 points)) helping the club reach the quarter-final of the Challenge Cup, and narrowly missing out on promotion to National League One following a 30–34 defeat in the play-off final against Halifax. After just two seasons he was signed by Super League side Hull F.C. after making 53 appearances for York.

==== Hull FC ====
Brough had a dream start at Hull, scoring four goals and a drop-goal in Hull's 2005 Challenge Cup Final win over Leeds Rhinos, with many claiming he was unlucky not to win the Lance Todd Trophy. After an impressive first season, he signed a new two-year contract with the club. During the following season, Brough lost his place in the starting lineup after the arrival of new head coach Peter Sharp, and was signed by Castleford Tigers for an undisclosed fee in June 2006.

==== Castleford Tigers ====
Brough played 10 games for Castleford in 2006, but was unable to prevent the team from being relegated from the Super League. He remained with Castleford in 2007 and was part of the team that won promotion from National League One back into the Super League.

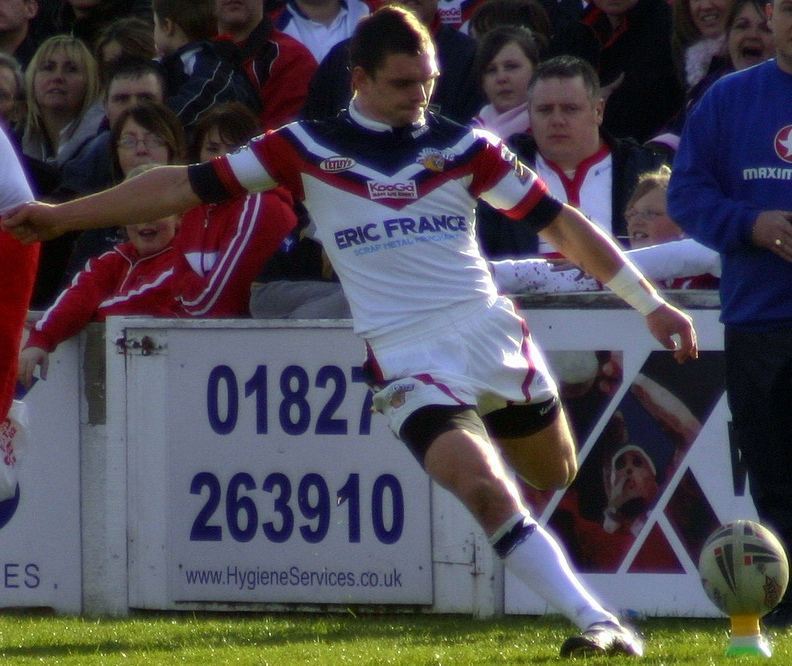
Brough kicking at goal for Wakefield

==== Wakefield Trinity ====
Following Castleford's promotion, Brough was signed by rivals Wakefield Trinity in 2008 and became a key player for the team, going on to win the Albert Goldthorpe Medal that year. Brough, again only stayed at Wakefield for two seasons before leaving at the end of 2009 to join West Yorkshire rivals Huddersfield. He made 57 appearances for Trinity scoring 468 points.

==== Huddersfield Giants ====
In March 2010, Brough was signed by Huddersfield Giants for a fee of £30,000, and agreed to loan Danny Kirmond to Wakefield until the end of the season.

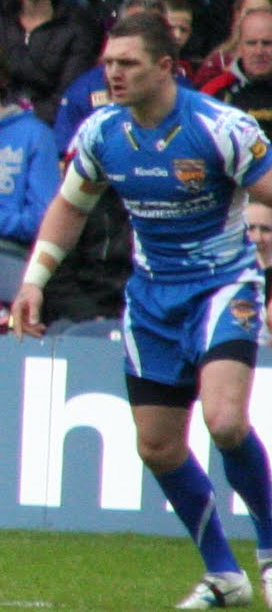
Brough playing for Huddersfield

He was named club captain during 2012 following the mid-season departure of Kevin Brown.

At the end of the 2013 Super League season, Brough won the Man of Steel award for his excellent performances throughout the season. He also became the first player ever to win a second Albert Goldthorpe Medal.

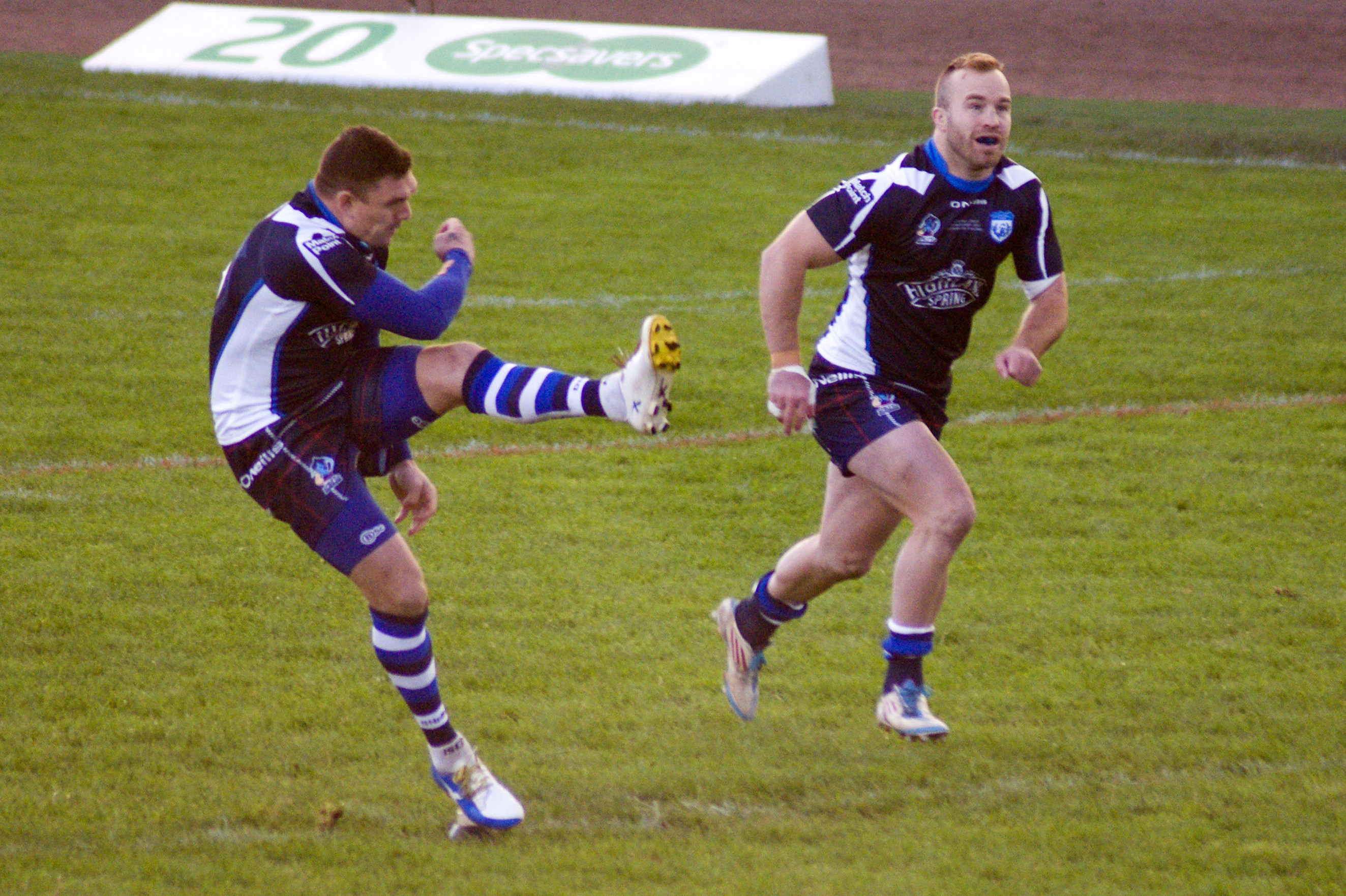
Brough and Ian Henderson playing for Scotland in 2013 Rugby League World Cup

==== Wakefield Trinity ====
Brough returned to Wakefield in 2019.

He left at the end of the 2020 season.

==== Bradford Bulls ====
In June 2020, it was announced that Brough would link up with former coach John Kear on a 2-year deal in the RFL Championship with the Bradford Bulls. Brough announced his retirement in November 2021.

=== International career ===
==== Scotland ====
Brough played at international level for Scotland, qualifying via his grandfather, making his international début in 2004 and playing in sporadic competitions and test matches.

In 2008 he was called up to the Scotland squad for the 2008 Rugby League World Cup, and was named captain for the first time. Brough's international future was thrown into question following the World Cup, as he announced his intention to switch allegiance to England in 2009, citing a lack of opportunities to play in major tournaments with Scotland. However, Brough was not selected for England, and did not feature at international level for two years.

In 2013, Brough reverted to Scotland and captained the team during the 2013 World Cup. After the tournament, Brough was shortlisted alongside Sonny Bill Williams and Greg Inglis for the RLIF International Player of the Year.

In October 2014, Brough led Scotland in the 2014 European Cup. The Winner of the tournament would qualify to play in the 2016 Four Nations alongside International heavyweights Australia, England and New Zealand. He played at his best throughout the tournament, earning him the 'Player of the Tournament' award. His performances and leadership inspired the team to qualify for 2016's major international rugby league competition and win the European Cup for the first ever time. Later in the year, his performances made him the clear winner for the 'Prince of Scots' award as the best player to play in the Bravehearts' jersey that year.

Again in October and November 2015, Brough decided to play for Scotland instead of taking a long off-season break and was therefore named as the captain of the Bravehearts in their 2015 European Cup campaign.

Five months before the 2016 Four Nations, Scotland announced Brough would captain the Bravehearts in their first tournament (other than the World Cup) against the 'big 3' international teams.

In 2017 Brough captained Scotland's squad in the 2017 Rugby League World Cup. He played in the matches against Tonga and New Zealand, but was then released from the squad and sent home before their final group match, after being deemed too drunk to board a flight in Christchurch.

==== England ====
Brough was eventually called into the England squad for an International Origin match in 2012. He was subsequently omitted once again from the England squad, and, amid heavy speculation, in 2013 announced that he would once again be committing to Scotland, having not featured for England once.

== Records and statistics ==
With a combined total of 3,987 points at club and representative level, Brough is the fifth highest points scorer in British rugby league history (behind Neil Fox, Jim Sullivan, Kevin Sinfield and Gus Risman).

Team	Appearances	Tries	Goals	Drop goals	Points
Dewsbury Rams	37	4	33	5	87
York City Knights	53	20	265	6	616
Hull	43	3	95	2	204
Castleford Tigers	35	12	153	4	358
Wakefield Trinity	83	21	280	10	654
Huddersfield Giants	247	51	793	25	1,815
Bradford Bulls	13	2	48	5	109
Club total	511	113	1,667	57	3,843
Scotland	24	4	58	2	134
England (v Exiles)	1	0	2	0	4
National League under-21s	1	0	3	0	6
Representative total	26	4	63	2	144
Career total	537	117	1,730	59	3,987

== Honours ==
Hull

- Challenge Cup: 2005

Huddersfield

- League Leaders' Shield: 2013

Individual

- Albert Goldthorpe Medal: 2008, 2013, 2014
- Man of Steel: 2013
- Super League Dream Team: 2013, 2015
