= Sam Tomkins =

England international rugby league footballer

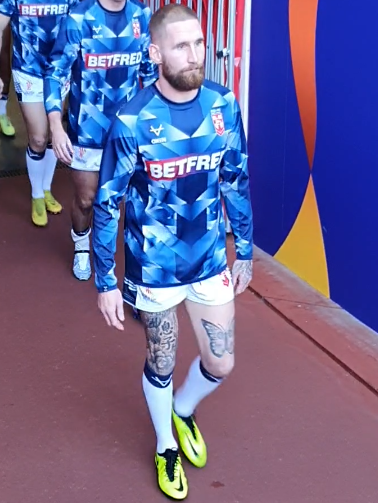
- Relatives: Joel Tomkins (brother); Logan Tomkins (brother)
- Rugby league career

Personal information
- Born: 23 March 1989 (age 37) Milton Keynes, England
- Height: 5 ft 11 in (1.80 m)
- Weight: 13 st 1 lb (83 kg)

Playing information

Rugby league
- Position: Fullback, Stand-off
Club
Years	Team	Pld	T	G	FG	P
2008–13	Wigan Warriors	152	144	35	2	648
2014–15	New Zealand Warriors	37	14	0	0	56
2016–18	Wigan Warriors	61	24	101	8	306
2019–23	Catalans Dragons	104	33	139	6	416
2024–25	Catalans Dragons	14	8	12	0	56
	Total	368	223	287	16	1482
Representative
Years	Team	Pld	T	G	FG	P
2009–22	England	29	18	1	0	74

Rugby union
- Position: Wing
Representative
Years	Team	Pld	T	G	FG	P
2011	Barbarians F.C.	1	1	0	0	5
- Source: As of 14 October 2023

Sam Tomkins (born 23 March 1989) is a professional rugby league analyst for Sky Sports and former professional player, having finished his playing career with Catalans Dragons in the Super League. He is also the Team Manager of the England national rugby league team, working in a "behind the scenes role" for head coach Shaun Wane.

Tomkins, a product of the Wigan Warriors academy, played as a fullback and occasional stand-off, across two stints for the Warriors as well as his time at Catalans Dragons. In addition, he also played two seasons in the NRL for New Zealand Warriors.

He is the two time Man of Steel, earning the title in 2012 and 2021.

He won three Super League Grand Finals with the Wigan Warriors in 2010, 2013, and 2018, as well as two Challenge Cup finals in 2011 and 2013.

== Early life ==
Tomkins was born on 23 March 1989 in Milton Keynes, Buckinghamshire, England. Following the birth of Sam's older brother Joel in Warrington, the family had moved to Milton Keynes due to his father's work. In the early 1990s, his family returned to the North West, to Chorley, where his younger brother Logan was born. Tomkins' first experience of rugby league came when he was seven years old, after his father introduced both Sam and Joel to the Chorley Panthers ARLFC.

By the time Tomkins was nine, both he and his older brother had moved from the Chorley Panthers and were becoming more involved with the amateur Wigan St. Patrick's club, a feeder team for the professional Wigan club. To aid their careers, the family decided to move the short distance from Chorley to Wigan, and Tomkins remained playing at the club until his mid-teens. Reflecting on Tomkins' time at Wigan St. Patrick's, Bill Atherton, the club's chairman, remarked that "you could see there was something special when Sam came up through the club. There has always been something different about him." When he was aged twelve, he obtained a place on the Wigan Warriors scholarship scheme, and when he turned sixteen, Tomkins was offered a part-time contract for Wigan Warriors Youth Development club's academy. By 2007, Tomkins was featuring regularly for the Wigan academy sides. That year, he featured in an under-18s win for the England Academy against France Cadets; his early try helped establish an early England lead before he completed his brace in the second half after a sin-binning for a high tackle. At the end of the year, Wigan rewarded Tomkins with a full-time contract, giving him the opportunity to train alongside players in the club's first team.

== Club career ==
=== Wigan Warriors ===
==== Debut season ====
When Wigan agreed to release five-eighth Trent Barrett from his contract, the club looked to find a long-term replacement. Tomkins was offered a one-year extension to his own contract, which would keep him at the club until the end of the 2010 season with another year optional. After signing the extension, Wigan head coach Brian Noble commented that Tomkins, along with Wigan teammate Mark Flanagan, "both have the ability to make an impact in Super League in years to come."

Trent is one of the world's best players at the moment. Just to play with him is an honour. You pick up so much off him and he's just a great player to play with. Joel was so supportive when I found out I was playing and really tipped me up on what to do – don't try and do too much, nothing silly. He's been a big help.

— Sam Tomkins, 14 May 2008, commenting on the influence of Trent Barrett and his brother Joel on his début performance against Whitehaven.

A pre-season unofficial friendly match provided Tomkins his first experience against top-flight opposition as he came off the bench during Lee Briers' testimonial match in a 22–30 defeat by the Warrington Wolves. Noble followed this up by providing Tomkins, aged 19, with his first team début on 12 May against Whitehaven in a fifth round Challenge Cup match. Tomkins became the first player in rugby league history to score five tries on his first-grade début, scoring his first three to complete a hat-trick within the first twelve minutes, as Wigan scored eighteen tries in total on the way to a 106–8 victory.

Despite this, Thomas Leuluai replaced Tomkins for the team's next match against Warrington, meaning Tomkins would have to wait for his Super League début. He played out the rest of the 2008 season in the reserves, some of his highlights including a hat-trick against Castleford, and another five-try performance against Harlequins RL. After scoring four tries against Hull FC's reserves, Tomkins was tipped to make at least ten Super League appearances in 2009 season by Shaun Wane, Wigan's reserve coach. He also received an endorsement from Ian Lenagan, the club's chairman, when he said, "I think Sam is going to be a world-class half-back and we want to give him his chance." Tomkins was named Reserve Team Player of the Year at the Wigan inaugural awards evening.

In 2009 Tomkins was awarded the Albert Goldthorpe Rookie of the Year Medal.

==== 2009 season ====
The club played Warrington over the 2008 Christmas holidays, as a pre-season friendly to Wigan's 2009 season. Tomkins claimed a hat-trick as the team swept aside a young and inexperienced Warrington side 44–4. Tomkins also featured in the club's two other fixtures during the pre-season, firstly against Huddersfield, and then against Leigh. For 2009, Tomkins was given the number 25 jersey.

What they bring is an enthusiasm and energy to the squad, and some older players have fed off that. You look at Sam and he's a big threat. It is like, 'Gosh. Look at this kid, he just plays'. That raw energy spills over to other people because the youngsters are happy to be there. There aren't many veterans in the squad, it is a pretty young team. But they've sparked other people up and we've seen that against Harlequins and Bradford.

— Brian Noble on Tomkins and Shaun Ainscough, 10 March 2009.

Wigan faced their worst start to a season since 1966 after losing their opening three matches. Tomkins was brought into the squad and came off the bench against Harlequins for his league début during their fourth match of the season. Tomkins made a break early in the second half which allowed George Carmont to claim the equalising try. Tomkins took Tim Smith's starting place in the team for their next match against Bradford Bulls. After scoring twice for a brace against Salford, he earned his first league tries. He also scored in a fourth round cup match against Barrow. For the round 10 fixture against Celtic Crusaders, Tomkins was relegated to the bench as Smith made his first start in eight games. However Tomkins came on as a substitute to score his second brace of the season.

He also scored the final try of the match in Wigan's fifth round cup win over Wakefield Trinity, and although he was found guilty on a charge of kicking out in the tackle against another player, he escaped a match ban. With Smith expressing his desire to return home to Australia following the 2009 season, Tomkins was tipped by Lenagan as Wigan's long-term replacement at stand-off. Tomkins was named in a train-on squad for England's friendly test match against France, although he did not play. He was dropped in round 15 for Wigan's match against Salford, but returned off the bench and scored against Hull Kingston Rovers in round 18. Tomkins played every game for Wigan thereafter, except for the final regular round fixture of the season against Huddersfield, until the team were knocked out of the Super League play-offs by St. Helens. Included in this run of appearances was a hat-trick and Tomkins' first drop goal against Castleford in round 25.

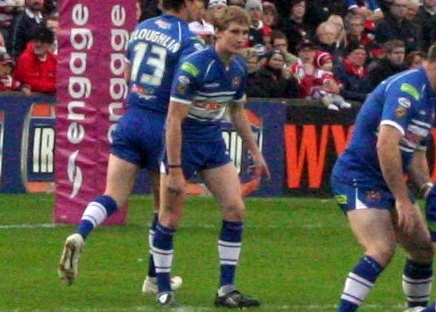
Sam Tomkins playing against St Helens in 2009

In the same year he made his league début, Tomkins was named in the Super League Dream Team at stand-off, and was also voted by journalists in the Rugby League Writers' Association as Super League Young Player of the Year. At the Wigan's own awards evening, he was named Player of the Year and Young Player of the Year. Tomkins would go on to play for England during the 2009 Four Nations. He ended the domestic season with twenty-seven first-grade appearances, twenty-three of which in the league, as well as fifteen tries. In doing this, Tomkins had more than doubled the estimation of ten league games made by Wane during the previous season. He was given a five-year contract from the club.

==== 2010 season ====
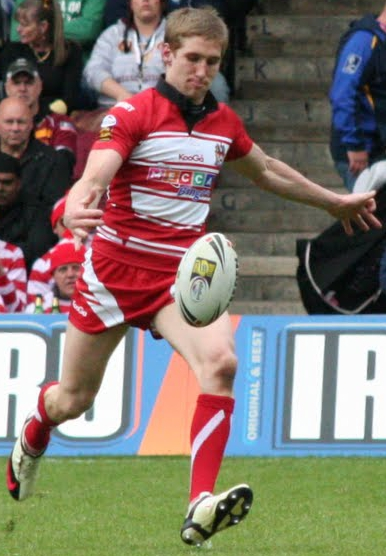
Tomkins playing for Wigan in 2010

Following the play-off loss to St. Helens, Noble announced his departure from the club after not being offered a new contract, and five days later Michael Maguire was revealed as the new head coach of Wigan. In Maguire's 2010 squad, Tomkins' position as Wigan's first choice stand-off was confirmed when he received the number 6 jersey from the departed Smith. The club also signed Wigan-born Paul Deacon during the pre-season, with the intention of having him mentor Tomkins in an assistant coaching role.

Tomkins played in every match of Wigan's 2010 season. He started in three cup matches, scoring hat-tricks against the Sheffield Eagles and Widnes. He also featured in all of Wigan's fixtures of 2010's Super League XV regular season, with the team finishing top of the league table and winning the League Leader's Shield. By virtue of this the team qualified for the play-offs, in which Tomkins made a further four appearances on the way to Wigan's Grand Final victory over St. Helens—the club's first league title since 1998's Super League III, and Tomkins' first honour as a player.

Tomkins was played at scrum-half for Wigan's round 12 fixture against Harlequins with Sean O'Loughlin covering his position at stand-off instead. In round 19, again against Harlequins, Tomkins marked his first league appearance as a fullback with the game's first score and a try-saving tackle on Lamont Bryan. The Daily Mirror reported Maguire as saying, "Sam wanted a go at fullback and played very well. He's a quality kid in any position." He remained in that position for the rest of the season, including the Grand Final, except for one match against Warrington in round 22 where he was reverted to stand-off again.

Over 34 total appearances, Tomkins improved on his 2009 record with 21 tries and four goals. In the league, he claimed four braces in total: once as a stand-off against Hull, and three times as a fullback against Salford, Hull again and Leeds.

He also scored a try in the 2010 Super League Grand Final victory over St. Helens at Old Trafford.

Despite finishing the season as Wigan's regular fullback, Tomkins maintained his place in the 2010 Super League Dream Team in the stand-off position. Also in the team was Joel Tomkins at second-row. This was the first time a Super League Dream Team had featured two brothers.

At 2010's Super League XV awards evening, where his Wigan teammate Pat Richards was voted by his fellow Super League players as Man of Steel for having the biggest impact on the season, Tomkins retained his Young Player of the Year title.

He also received 2010's Albert Goldthorpe Medal for 'best and fairest' player of the season. He was also named Rookie of the Year by the Rugby League International Federation during the 2010 Four Nations, in which he played for England.

==== 2011 season ====
The previous season's transition to fullback was made permanent by the club when Tomkins inherited the number 1 jersey from Cameron Phelps, whose 2010 season was blighted by injury and was not offered a new contract. With speculation that Tomkins might move to the National Rugby League or switch codes to rugby union, Wigan offered him a new five-year contract keeping him at the club until the end of the 2015 season.

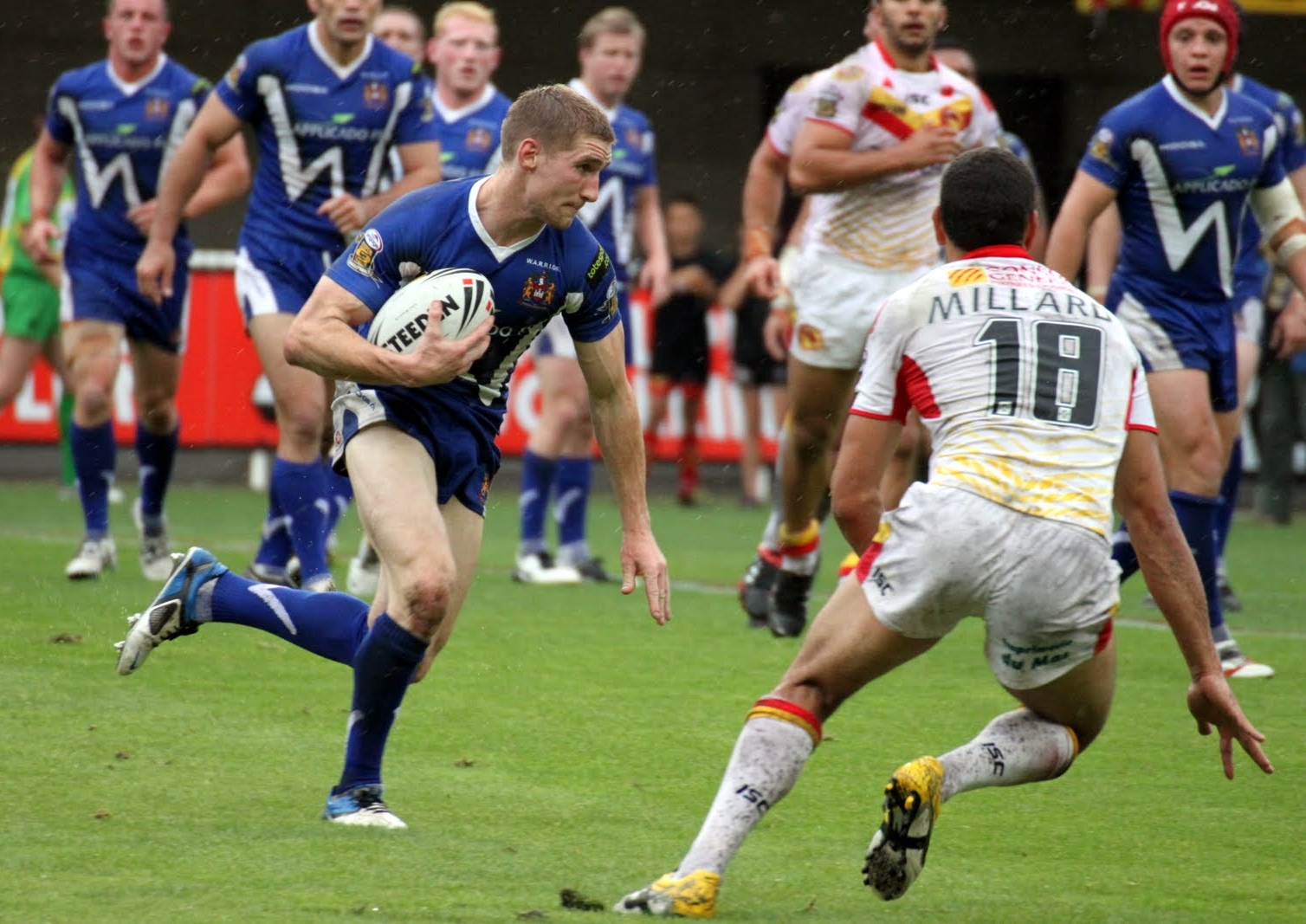
Sam Tomkins playing in 2011, running at Daryl Millard of the Catalans Dragons

Tomkins made 34 appearances during the 2011 season: 28 in Super League XVI, 5 in the Challenge Cup, and one in the World Club Challenge, in which he scored a drop goal in Wigan's 15–21 loss to the St. George Illawarra Dragons. Tomkins received a match ban in round 6, for joining a fight in the previous match against Hull, meaning that for the first time since the final regular round fixture against Huddersfield in 2009, he missed a first-grade match. Due to his involvement for England in the inaugural International Origin against the Exiles, he was also rested for Wigan's away game against Castleford.

His scoring record in 2011 started in the opening round against St Helens in which he kicked a goal but missed a drop goal which would have won the game for Wigan. His first try came during Wigan's next game at Bradford. A match-tying penalty kicked by Tomkins salvaged a draw for Wigan against Leeds. From 25 April to 4 June, Tomkins scored thirteen tries in seven games for Wigan, including braces against Crusaders and Harlequins in the league and Barrow in the cup, as well as a hat-trick against Hull Kingston Rovers. He scored his second hat-trick of the season against Huddersfield, taking his career total to six. In Wigan's fifth round cup win over Bradford, Gareth Raynor's high tackle left Tomkins unconscious as he was scoring a try, an incident which ended both Raynor's and Tomkins' involvement in the match due to a sending-off, and a head injury respectively. Despite missing part of Wigan's away match to Hull because of a shoulder injury, Tomkins returned from the bench and scored two tries in a 16–30 victory; after the match, Sky Sports reported that he had become a "strong favourite" for the season's Man of Steel award. He followed this up a week later with a try-scoring man of the match performance against St. Helens as Wigan won their first cup semi-final since 2004. Wigan returned to league action with a win at home to Salford, with Tomkins scoring four tries. He scored another brace against Bradford in Wigan's last match before the Challenge Cup final.

Tomkins played in that final as part of a victorious Wigan team, giving Tomkins his first Challenge Cup honour, although Jeff Lima was given the Lance Todd Trophy award which Tomkins had been pre-match favourite to win. After the final, the Rugby Football League investigated and found Tomkins guilty of an obscene gesture aimed at fans of the opposing Leeds team, for which he was given a suspended £1,000 fine.

His points tally for Wigan's season totalled 32 tries, five goals, and one drop goal. After the season, he signed a new contract to play for Wigan Warriors, shortly after his brother Joel had agreed to switch codes and play rugby union for Saracens F.C. According to The Guardian, the deal would make Sam Tomkins the highest paid player in Super League at £300,000 a year, and this ruled out the prospect of a cross-code transfer for at least three years.

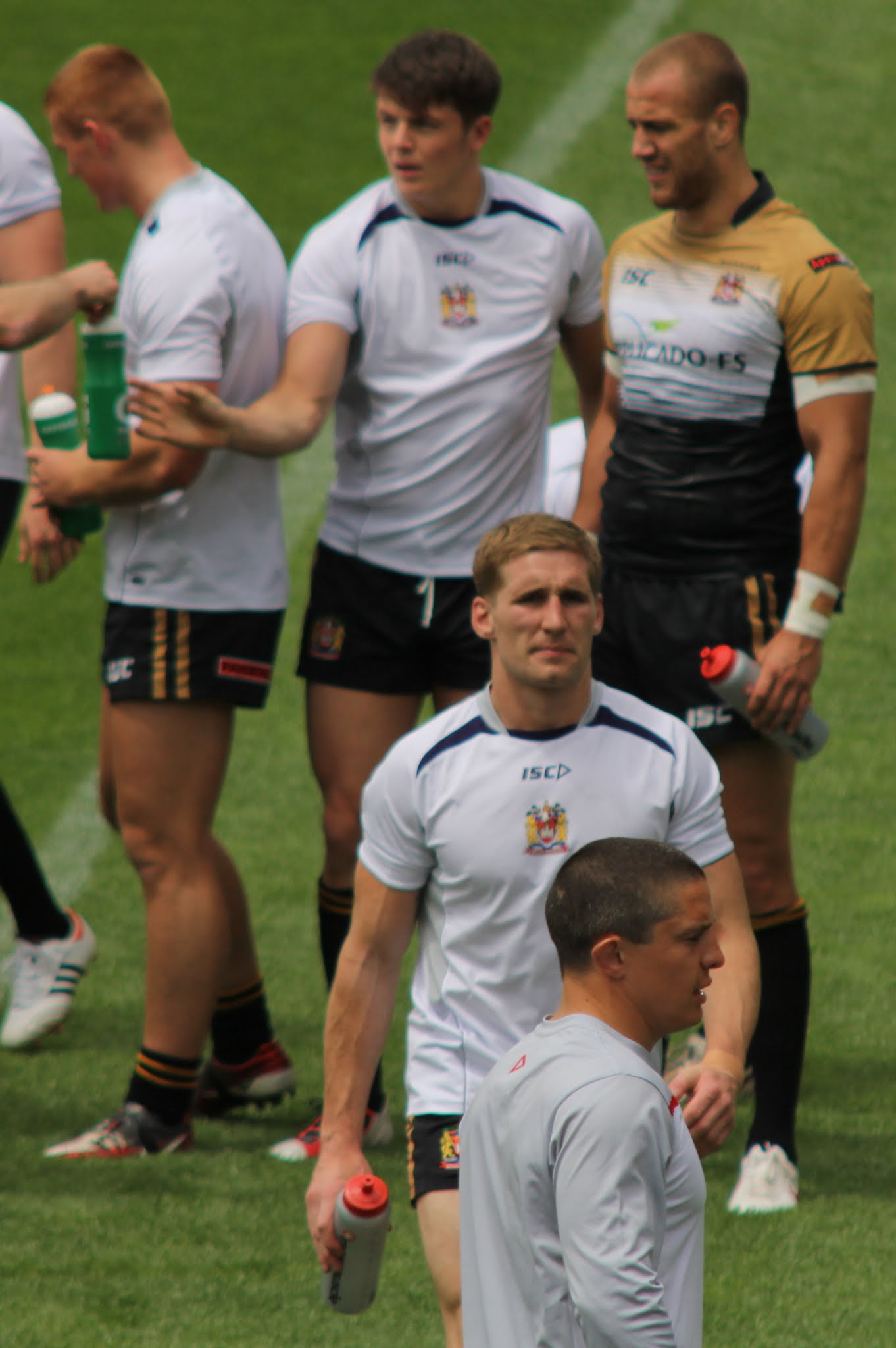
Tomkins in 2012

==== 2012 season ====
Tomkins scored 36 tries in 30 games for Wigan in 2012.

==== 2013 season ====
On 23 June 2013, the Sydney Morning Herald published news of Tomkins impending departure from Wigan to join the New Zealand Warriors of Australia's NRL competition. Further speculation regarding the move was sparked when Tomkins' mother was seen in Auckland in July looking at residential properties. On 24 September 2013, it was confirmed that Tomkins would join the Warriors on a three-year deal starting in 2014, signed for a world record fee.

He played in the 2013 Challenge Cup Final victory over Hull F.C. at Wembley Stadium.

He played in the 2013 Super League Grand Final victory over the Warrington Wolves at Old Trafford.

=== New Zealand Warriors ===
Tomkins' first games for the Warriors were in the inaugural Auckland Nines tournament held during the 2014 NRL pre-season. His first official game came in the first round of the new NRL season against the Parramatta Eels. The Warriors lost 36–16. In his second game, against the St. George Illawarra Dragons, he scored a try in the Warriors' 31–12 loss. He scored his second try of the season in the Warriors' 42-18 thumping against the Tigers in round 4 of the season.

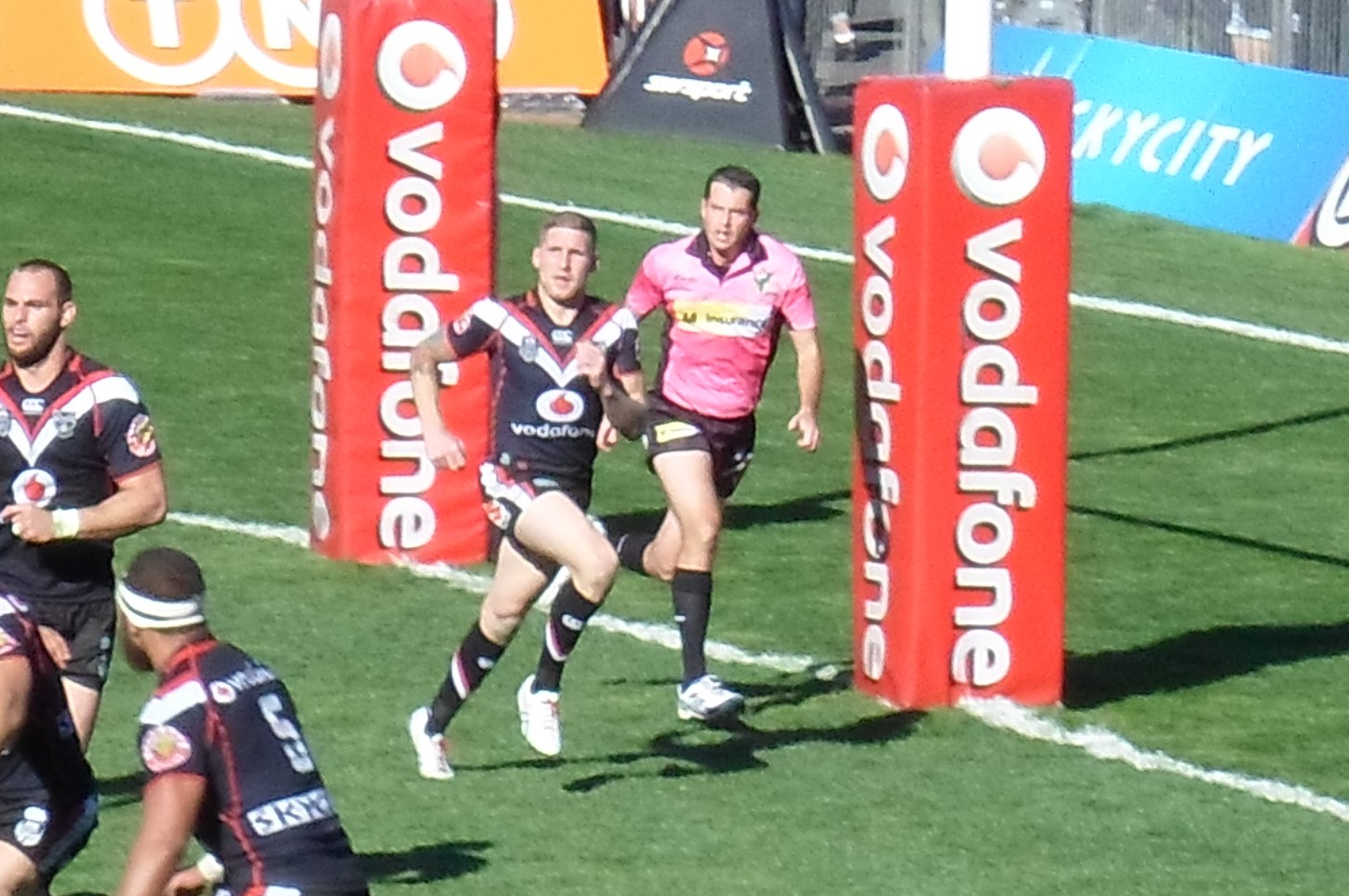
Warriors fullback Sam Tomkins during a game against the Sydney Roosters in 2014

He had his breakout game for the New Zealand club in the round 18 48–0 victory over the Parramatta Eels. Tomkins scored two tries, one of which was directly from the lock position after a scrum win against the feed. The other of which, also from a scrum play, was down the short side where he broke four tackles in a fantastic individual effort. He also set up a brilliant try for captain Simon Mannering. In the first half, Tomkins recorded nine tackle breaks, a try assist, two line breaks, 84 running metres and two tries. His first half performance truly put him on the map in the National Rugby League after some debate previous to this game over whether he was worth the big money.

Tomkins presence at the Warriors saw long term club and New Zealand national rugby league team fullback Kevin Locke out of favour and languishing in the NSW Cup side. As a consequence of Tomkins good form, Locke was released by the club mid-season so he could join English side Salford.

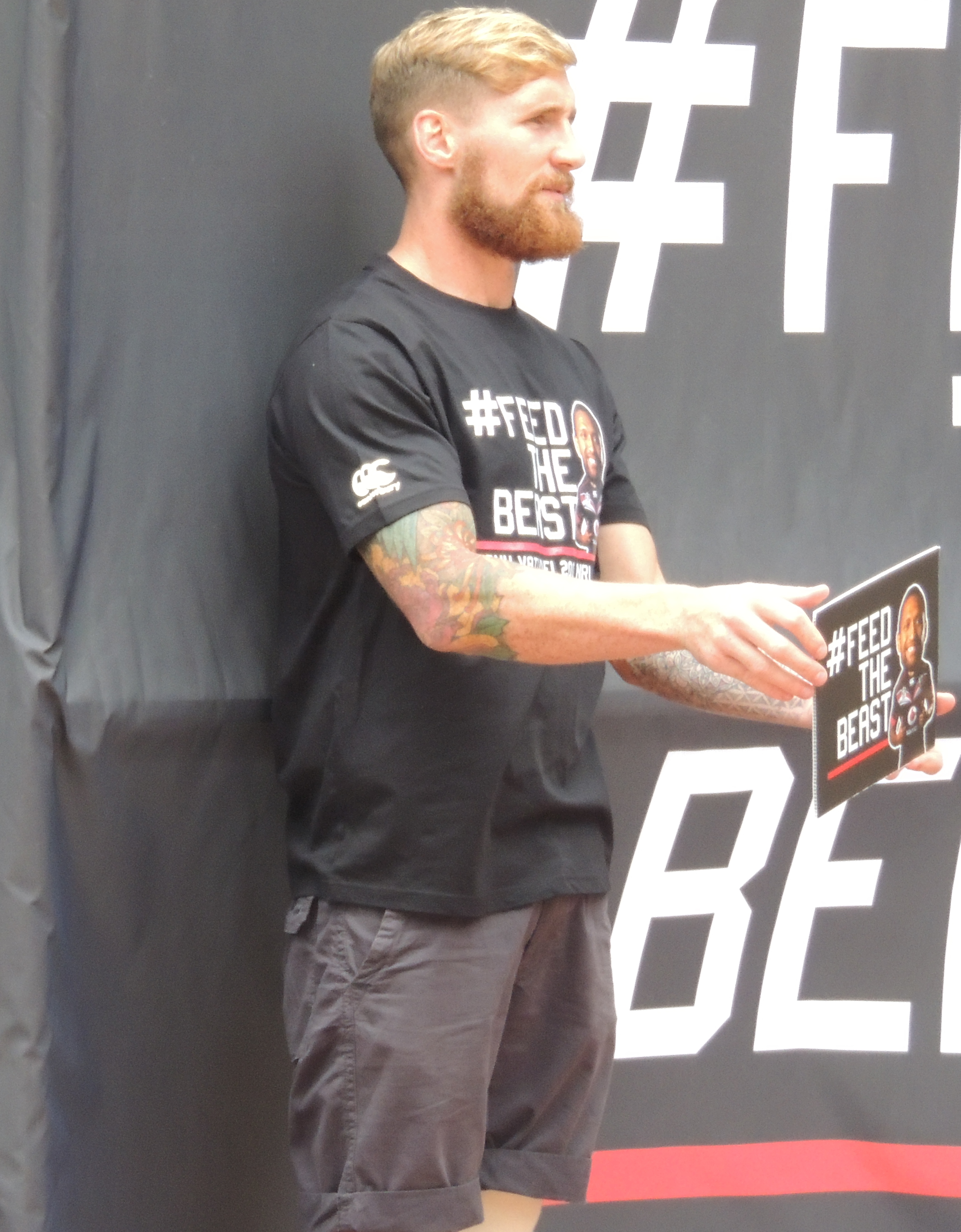
Tomkins representing the New Zealand Warriors in 2015

The Warriors announced that Tomkins would leave the club at the end of 2015 due to injury and suffering from homesickness.

=== Return to Wigan ===
==== 2016 ====
Tomkins returned to Wigan after two seasons in the NRL with New Zealand Warriors for £200,000 signing a four-year contract as their marquee player. He underwent surgery on a posterior cruciate ligament injury in November 2015 ruling him out for the start of the 2016 Super League season, however due to complications he did not appear for Wigan until 13 May at home against Hull FC. He went on to make 16 appearances scoring 7 tries before undergoing more knee surgery meaning he missed the start of the 2017 season.

==== 2017 ====
Tomkins did not play for Wigan until the Challenge Cup quarter final against the Warrington Wolves where it was his drop goal that won the tie for Wigan. He quickly settled into the squad with two assists in his first two Super League games of the year before scoring a try against Catalans Dragons in Round 21. He continued his good form with tries against Leeds Rhinos and Huddersfield Giants.

He played in the 2017 Challenge Cup Final defeat by Hull F.C. at Wembley Stadium.

His fifth and last try of the season came against Castleford Tigers in the 6th Round of the Super 8's.

==== 2018 ====
After struggling with knee injuries for the previous two seasons, Tomkins was available to play in the Super League from Round 1 against Salford Red Devils. His only contribution in the first three games was an assist in the first game however he showed that he may be back to his best after a 65m run to score a try against the Widnes Vikings in Round 4. After catching a Tom Gilmore kick on the full he beat three defenders to race away to score his first try of the season. In Round 5 he got four assists showing that he was back to his best in the fullback role but thriving when rotated into halfback when Morgan Escaré came off the bench. Four assists and two tries followed in the next three games before a 45m drop goal won the game against Leeds Rhinos in a tense 8-9 thriller. Two tries against Round 14 opponents Salford Red Devils and one against Challenge Cup opponents Hull Kingston Rovers preceded the news that he would be leaving to join the Catalans Dragons in 2019 which put an end to months of speculation. Further tries against Warrington Wolves at the Dacia Magic Weekend in Newcastle, Castleford Tigers, Huddersfield Giants, St. Helens and future employers Catalans Dragons pushed his tally to 11 for the season. As the primary kicker in the Wigan Warriors side he scored 95 goals from 127 attempts giving him an accuracy level of 75%, this along a relatively injury free year helped propel Wigan Warriors to second on the Super League table ensuring a home semi final against either the Castleford Tigers or the Warrington Wolves. The year was not without event however as in early June a video of Sam and brother Joel emerged appearing to show the two being abusive towards bar staff at a local pub. For his part in the incident Sam was fined £5,000 however Joel who was the main culprit in the abusive rant was fined £10,000 and suspended before later being released.

He played in the 2018 Super League Grand Final victory over the Warrington Wolves at Old Trafford.

=== Catalans Dragons ===
Tomkins played 13 games for Catalans Dragons in the 2020 Super League season including the 48-2 semi-final loss against St Helens.

On 5 October 2021, Tomkins was awarded with the Man of Steel for his efforts with Catalans throughout the season. On 9 October 2021, Tomkins played for Catalans in their 2021 Super League Grand Final loss against St. Helens.

In April 2022, Tomkins fractured his fibula in the Challenge Cup quarterfinal against St Helens ruling him out for a minimum of four weeks. In round 20, Tomkins kicked a drop goal to win the game for Catalans against Huddersfield 13-12. Tomkins played 21 games for Catalans in the 2022 Super League season including their elimination playoff loss to Leeds.

In March 2023, Tomkins announced that he would be retiring at the end of the season, following issues with his knee after injuring it in 2022. He delayed his decision to retire in order to play in the 2021 World Cup.

In the 2023 semi-final against St Helens, Tomkins scored the winning try with less than one minute remaining to take Catalans into the grand final and also end St Helens four-year dominance of the competition. On 14 October, Tomkins played in Catalans 2023 Super League Grand Final loss against Wigan which was also his final game as a player.

==== Return ====
In July 2024, Tomkins announced a return to Catalans Dragons, coming out of retirement until the end of the season to aid the club's push for play-offs and a place in the Grand Final following "confidence" in his knee again. Tomkins made his second debut for the club on 27 July 2024, scoring a try on his return from retirement in a 24–16 victory over Hull F.C.. On his third game back against Huddersfield Giants, Tomkins suffered a hamstring injury.

On 4 October, Tomkins signed an extension for the 2025 season. Two months into the season, he announced his second retirement would come at the end of the season saying "this year is definitely my last". He had scored five tries in five appearances of the season at the time of the announcement. Tomkins had his contract terminated two months early by mutual consent seeing him retire in August. He finished his time at Catalans as their third all time points scorer.

== International career ==
=== England ===
In the 2008 World Cup, co-hosted by Australia and New Zealand, England's campaign ended with a 32–22 loss to New Zealand at the semi-final stage. England responded to their exit from the tournament by replacing a number of veterans with younger players for the 2009 Four Nations. Tomkins, who was then playing at stand-off for Wigan, was included in a new-look squad which featured a quarter of its players aged 21 or below.

In broken play, he is absolutely devastating. If the defensive line is not quite strong enough, he will absolutely rip you to shreds. He is a rising star in rugby league.

— Iestyn Harris, Wales head coach, 18 October 2009.

On 18 October 2009, having played less than thirty games for Wigan, Tomkins made his international début for Tony Smith's England team against Wales at Brewery Field in a warm-up match for the Four Nations tournament. The then-twenty-year-old scored a hat-trick in a 12–48 victory, with Iestyn Harris, the Welsh head coach and former dual-code rugby international, praising Tomkins' contribution to the winning England team. Despite this, Tomkins was left out of the squad that faced France in the opening Four Nations fixture. He replaced Richie Myler for England's defeat by Australia at Wigan's DW Stadium, with an impressed Darren Lockyer, the Australian captain, stating after the match, "To be honest, we didn't really know their young fellas. We do now." With Smith showing confidence in the young half-back pairing between Kyle Eastmond, and Tomkins, Tomkins maintained his place in the squad which won their must-win match against New Zealand for a place in the tournament final. The hosting England side, playing at Elland Road, Leeds, were overcome by Australia in the closing thirty minutes of the final despite leading 16–14 at one point, although the pairing between Eastmond and Tomkins was, according to Sky Sports, impressive.

Smith resigned as England coach following the Four Nations, with Steve McNamara announced as the team's new head coach. Tomkins kept his place in the England team when they played France in a mid-season friendly, and he responded by scoring four tries on England's way to a 60–6 win, a record-equalling tally for an England player in a single match. Tomkins appeared in all three of England's matches at the 2010 Four Nations, firstly in a defeat by New Zealand where a Kevin Brown try scored from a Tomkins kick was disallowed by the video referee due to Tomkins pushing Greg Eastwood in the process. Another comprehensive defeat by Australia ended England's hopes of reaching the final, in a match where Tomkins made his first international switch from the halves to fullback. He stayed in this position for England's final match against Papua New Guinea, a 36–10 victory in which Tony Clubb equalled Tomkins' four-try record.

Tomkins featured at full-back for the inaugural International Origin in 2011, which England lost thanks to Wigan teammate George Carmont's 79th minute try for the Exiles. Tomkins was booed by England supporters from opposing clubs within the Headingley crowd at Leeds, an incident which was criticised as "disgraceful" by Jamie Peacock, the England captain and Leeds forward, however Wigan head coach Michael Maguire claimed Tomkins had not been affected by the abuse. Following the completion of the rugby league domestic season, Tomkins was included in a pre-Four Nations test against France. In England's opening match of the 2011 Four Nations against Wales, he scored four tries, which for the second time in his international career equalled the record for the most tries by a player representing England. After playing against Australia at Wembley Stadium in a match which England ended the losing side, Tomkins scored a try against New Zealand. England's victory over the Kiwis meant that for the second time in three years, Tomkins featured for England in a Four Nations final against Australia, although they ended runners-up to Australia after losing 8–30. Playing fullback, Tomkins had an unhappy night under the high ball at Elland Road.

Following the 2014 Four Nations, Tomkins did not feature for England for the next few years. He was forced to withdraw from the Test series against New Zealand in 2015 due to injury, and was not selected for the 2017 Rugby League World Cup. He was recalled to the England squad in 2018.

He was selected in England 9s squad for the 2019 Rugby League World Cup 9s.

In June 2021, he was named as England's new captain, following the retirement of Sean O'Loughlin. He was selected for the 2021 Rugby League World Cup, starting at fullback in four of England's five matches before their semi-final defeat against Samoa.

=== Barbarians ===
In November 2011, Tomkins played at right wing, and scored a try for the Barbarians, a British-based invitational rugby union side, against the Australian Wallabies, although the Barbarians lost 11–60. The match was Tomkins's first match of professional rugby union; Tomkins admitted that prior to training with the Barbarians he did not know what numbers were allocated to which position in rugby union. On his first experience of the sport, Tomkins was quoted by the BBC as saying, "I am glad I have had the chance to play but I am still a professional rugby league footballer."

== Broadcasting career ==
Following his 2023 retirement as a player, Tomkins joined the Sky Sports match commentary team as an analyst for the 2024 season. He continued his broadcasting work during his 2024 playing return.

== Coaching career ==
In September 2024, Tomkins was appointed Team Manager of the England national rugby league team - a "behind-the-scenes administrative role".

== Career statistics ==
=== Club career ===
Club	Season	Appearances	Tries	Goals	F/G	Points
Wigan Warriors	2008	1	5	-	-	20
Wigan Warriors	2009	27	15	-	1	61
Wigan Warriors	2010	34	21	4	-	92
Wigan Warriors	2011	34	33	5	1	143
Wigan Warriors	2012	30	36	26	-	196
Wigan Warriors	2013	26	34	-	-	136
Wigan Warriors	Total	152	144	35	2	648
New Zealand Warriors	2014	24	13	-	-	52
New Zealand Warriors	2015	13	1	-	-	4
New Zealand Warriors	Total	37	14	-	-	56
Wigan Warriors	2016	16	7	-	-	28
Wigan Warriors	2017	15	5	2	2	26
Wigan Warriors	2018	30	12	100	6	254
Wigan Warriors	Total	61	24	102	8	308
Total		250	182	137	10	1012

=== International Test caps ===
Matches do not include friendly matches or International Origin matches as these are unofficial test matches.

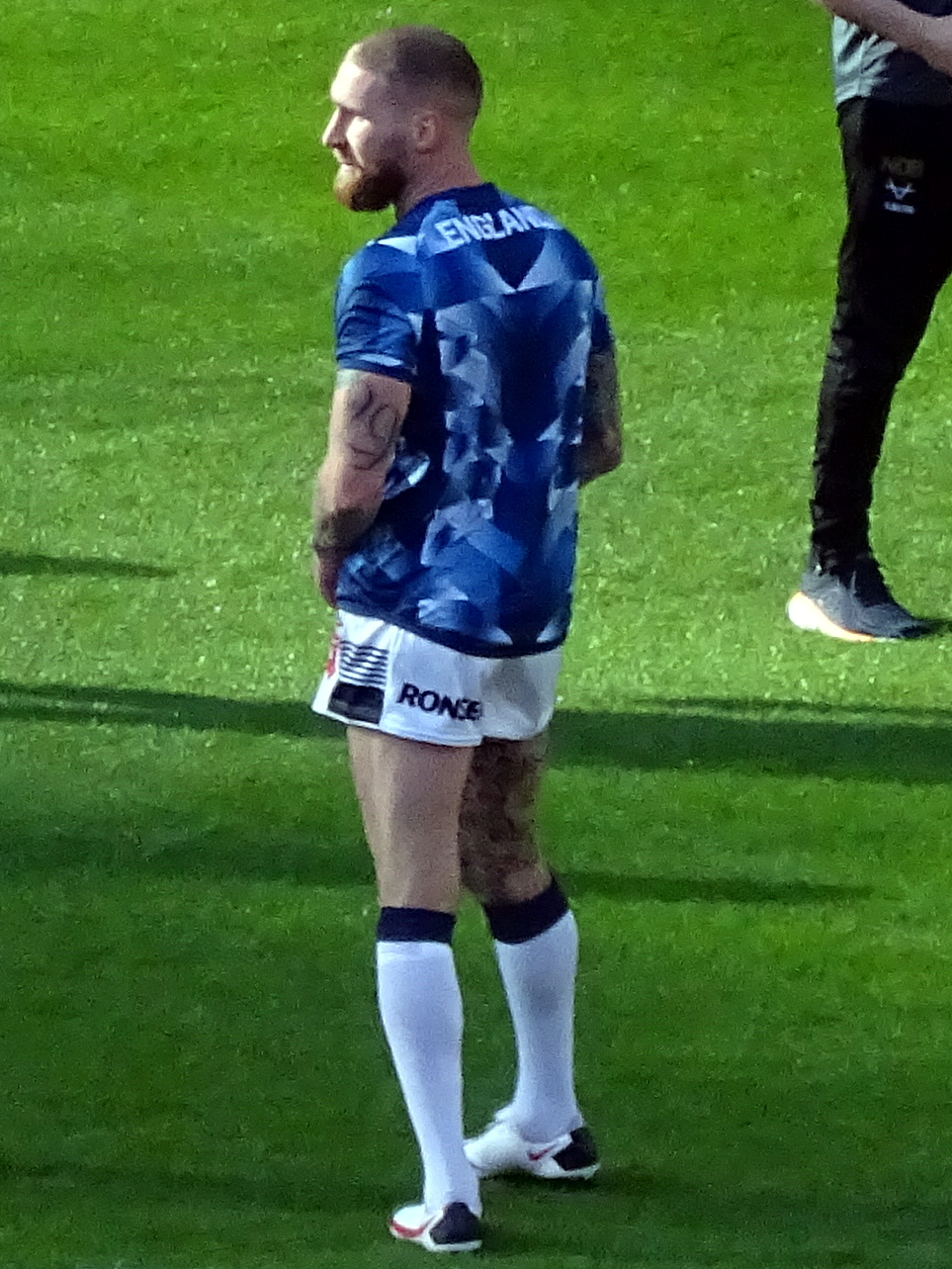
Tomkins warming up for England in 2022

#	Date	Venue	Opponent	Score	Result	Competition
1	18 October 2009	Brewery Field, Bridgend, Wales	Wales	12–48	Win	Test match
2	31 October 2009	DW Stadium, Wigan, England	Australia	16–26	Loss	2009 Four Nations
3	7 November 2009	Galpharm Stadium, Huddersfield, England	New Zealand	20–12	Win	2009 Four Nations
4	14 November 2009	Elland Road, Leeds, England	Australia	16–46	Loss	2009 Four Nations
5	12 June 2010	Leigh Sports Village, Leigh, England	France	60–6	Win	Test match
6	23 October 2010	Westpac Stadium, Wellington, New Zealand	New Zealand	24–10	Loss	2010 Four Nations
7	31 October 2010	AAMI Park, Melbourne, Australia	Australia	34–14	Loss	2010 Four Nations
8	6 November 2010	Eden Park, Auckland, New Zealand	Papua New Guinea	36–10	Win	2010 Four Nations
9	21 October 2011	Parc des Sports, Avignon, France	France	18–32	Win	Test match
10	29 October 2011	Leigh Sports Village, Leigh, England	Wales	42–4	Win	2011 Four Nations
11	5 November 2011	Wembley Stadium, London, England	Australia	20–36	Loss	2011 Four Nations
12	12 November 2011	KC Stadium, Hull, England	New Zealand	28–6	Win	2011 Four Nations
13	19 November 2011	Elland Road, Leeds, England	Australia	8–30	Loss	2011 Four Nations
14	3 November 2012	MS3 Craven Park, Hull, England	France	44–6	Win	2012 Autumn International Series
15	11 November 2012	Salford City Stadium, Salford, England	France	48–4	Win	2012 Autumn International Series
16	26 October 2013	Millennium Stadium, Cardiff, Wales	Australia	20–28	Loss	2013 Rugby League World Cup
17	2 November 2013	John Smith's Stadium, Huddersfield, England	Ireland	42–0	Win	2013 Rugby League World Cup
18	9 November 2013	KC Stadium, Hull, England	Fiji	34–12	Win	2013 Rugby League World Cup
19	16 November 2013	DW Stadium, Wigan, England	France	34–6	Win	2013 Rugby League World Cup
20	23 November 2013	Wembley Stadium, London, England	New Zealand	18–20	Loss	2013 Rugby League World Cup
21	25 October 2014	Suncorp Stadium, Brisbane, Australia	Samoa	32–26	Win	2014 Four Nations
22	2 November 2014	AAMI Park, Melbourne, Australia	Australia	16–12	Loss	2014 Four Nations
23	8 November 2014	Forsyth Barr Stadium, Dunedin, New Zealand	New Zealand	16–14	Loss	2014 Four Nations

=== International tries ===
#	Date	Venue	Opponent	Score	Result	Competition
1	18 October 2009	Brewery Field, Bridgend, Wales	Wales	12–48	Win	Test match
2	18 October 2009	Brewery Field, Bridgend, Wales	Wales	12–48	Win	Test match
3	18 October 2009	Brewery Field, Bridgend, Wales	Wales	12–48	Win	Test match
4	12 June 2010	Leigh Sports Village, Leigh, England	France	60–6	Win	Test match
5	12 June 2010	Leigh Sports Village, Leigh, England	France	60–6	Win	Test match
6	12 June 2010	Leigh Sports Village, Leigh, England	France	60–6	Win	Test match
7	12 June 2010	Leigh Sports Village, Leigh, England	France	60–6	Win	Test match
8	29 October 2011	Leigh Sports Village, Leigh, England	Wales	42–4	Win	2011 Four Nations
9	29 October 2011	Leigh Sports Village, Leigh, England	Wales	42–4	Win	2011 Four Nations
10	29 October 2011	Leigh Sports Village, Leigh, England	Wales	42–4	Win	2011 Four Nations
11	29 October 2011	Leigh Sports Village, Leigh, England	Wales	42–4	Win	2011 Four Nations
12	12 November 2011	KC Stadium, Hull, England	New Zealand	28–6	Win	2011 Four Nations
13	3 November 2012	MS3 Craven Park, Hull, England	France	44–6	Win	2012 Autumn International Series
14	3 November 2012	MS3 Craven Park, Hull, England	France	44–6	Win	2012 Autumn International Series
15	11 November 2012	Salford City Stadium, Salford, England	France	48–4	Win	2012 Autumn International Series
16	11 November 2012	Salford City Stadium, Salford, England	France	48–4	Win	2012 Autumn International Series
17	25 October 2014	Suncorp Stadium, Brisbane, Australia	Samoa	32–26	Win	2014 Four Nations

== Honours ==
=== Wigan Warriors ===
- Super League
  - Winners (3): 2010, 2013, 2018
- League Leaders' Shield
  - Winners (2): 2010, 2012
  - Runner-up (2): 2011, 2018
- Challenge Cup
  - Winners (2): 2011, 2013
  - Runner-up (1): 2017
- World Club Challenge
  - Winners (1): 2017
  - Runner-up (1): 2011

=== Catalans Dragons ===
- Super League
  - Runner-up (2): 2021, 2023
- League Leaders' Shield:
  - Winners (1): 2021
  - Runner-up (1): 2023

=== England ===
- World Cup:
  - Runner-up (1): 2017

=== Individual ===
- Man of Steel:
  - Winners (2): 2012, 2021
- Super League Dream Team
  - Winners (8): 2009, 2010, 2011, 2012, 2013, 2014 2021, 2023
- Super League Player of the Year:
  - Winners (1): 2011
- Super League Young Player of the Year:
  - Winners (2): 2009, 2010
- RLWBA Player of the Year:
  - Winners (3): 2011, 2012, 2021
- Albert Goldthorpe Medal:
  - Winners (1): 2010
- Rookie of the Year:
  - Winners (1): 2009
- RLIF Rookie of the Year
  - Winners (1): 2010
- Wigan Warriors Player of the Year
  - Winners (2): 2009, 2011
- Wigan Warriors Young Player of the Year
  - Winners (1): 2009
- Wigan Warriors Reserve Team Player of the Year
  - Winners (1): 2008
