= Danny Nutley =

Australian rugby league footballer

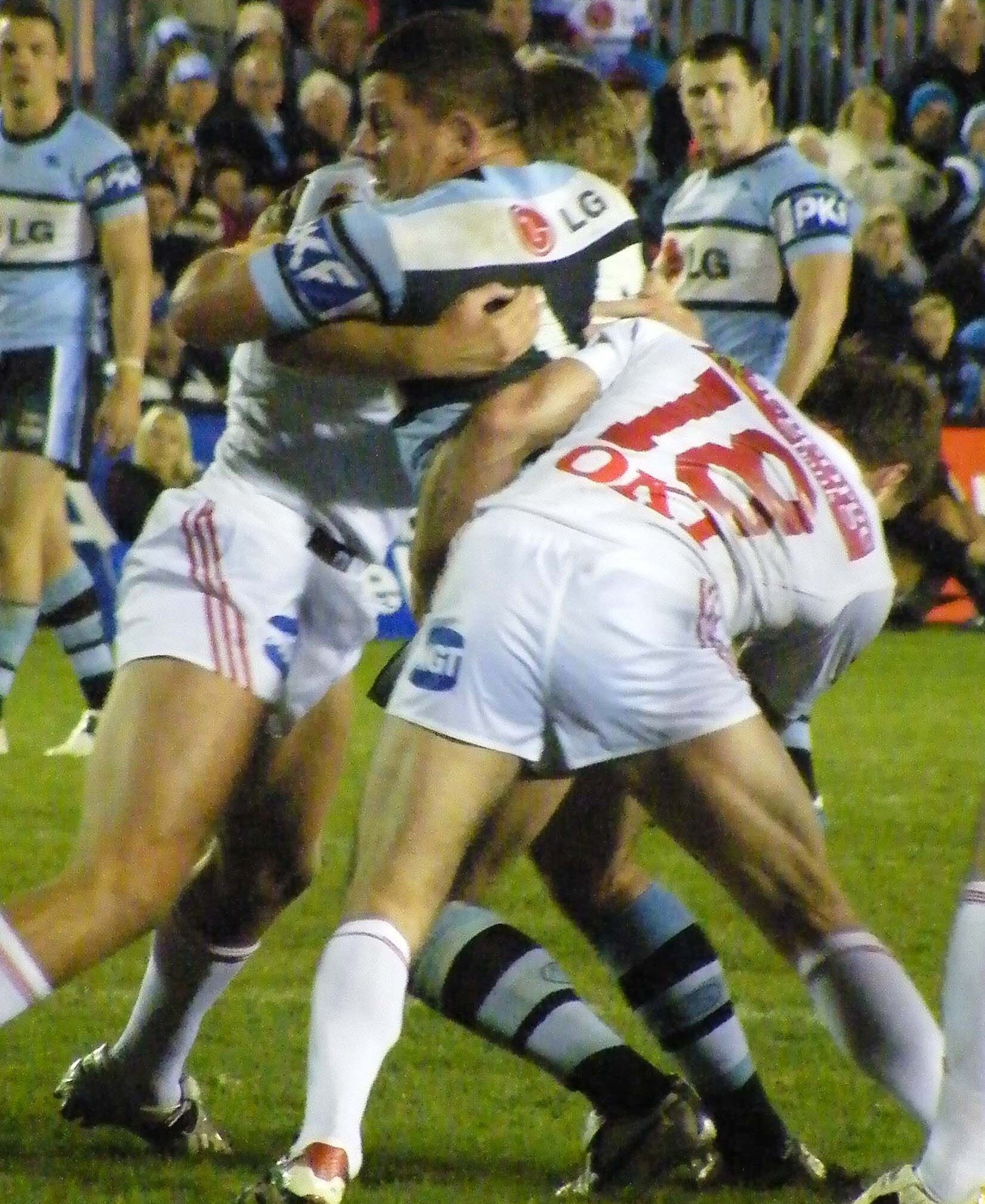

Personal information
- Full name: Daniel Nutley
- Born: 4 February 1974 (age 52) Brisbane, Queensland, Australia

Playing information
- Height: 176 cm (5 ft 9 in)
- Weight: 95 kg (14 st 13 lb)
- Position: Prop
Club
Years	Team	Pld	T	G	FG	P
1997	South Qld Crushers	10	0	0	0	0
1998–01	Warrington Wolves	106	3	0	0	12
2002–05	Cronulla Sharks	97	9	0	0	36
2006	Castleford Tigers	28	3	0	0	12
2007	Sydney Roosters	24	0	0	0	0
2008	Cronulla Sharks	21	1	0	0	4
	Total	286	16	0	0	64
Representative
Years	Team	Pld	T	G	FG	P
2005	Queensland	1	0	0	0	0

Danny Nutley (born 4 February 1974 in Brisbane, Queensland), also known by the nickname of "Nuts", is an Australian former professional rugby league footballer who played in the 1990s and 2000s. A Queensland State of Origin representative prop, he played his club football with the South Queensland Crushers, Cronulla-Sutherland Sharks and Sydney Roosters in Australia, and with the Warrington Wolves and the Castleford Tigers in England.

== Playing career ==
Nutley was named the Redcliffe Dolphins player of the year in 1996 before joining the South Queensland Crushers in 1997. Nutley made 10 appearances for South Queensland as the club finished last on the table claiming the wooden spoon. Nutley played in South Queensland's final ever game as a club which was a 39–18 victory over Western Suburbs.

Nutley later played for Warrington in the Super League competition and then returned to Australia to play with Cronulla-Sutherland.

In Nutley's first season back in the NRL, Cronulla finished 5th on the table and reached the preliminary final before being defeated by New Zealand.

Nutley played a further three seasons for Cronulla. Nutley made his début in 2005, playing for Queensland in the State of Origin.

In 2006, Nutley was voted into the Super League Dream Team. "It's a good achievement and fantastic to be in a team with this calibre of player," said the then Castleford captain Nutley, who finished the year as the competition's top tackler as well as the leading metre-maker.

Nutley returned to Australia to play for the Sydney Roosters, in 2007 following a successful stint in the Super League competition with Castleford.

In 2008, Nutley left the Sydney Roosters to rejoin former club Cronulla.

Nutley played 21 games for Cronulla in 2008 as the club finished 3rd on the table. Cronulla made it to the preliminary final before being defeated by Melbourne 28–0. This would also prove to be Nutley's final game in first grade.

Nutley then retired following the conclusion of Cronulla's 2008 season.
