= Tony Hannan =

Tony Hannan (born 11 June 1963 in Bradford, Yorkshire, England) is an author, journalist and publisher who specialises in British popular culture.

== Books ==
Hannan has authored and edited numerous books, including Underdogs – A Year in the Life of a Rugby League Town. Among his other titles are On Behalf of the Committee, a comprehensive history of northern English comedy, and Being Eddie Waring, a critically acclaimed biography of the BBC rugby league commentator of that name . In 2010, this was the basis for a BBC Four television documentary, Eddie Waring: Mr Rugby League. .

== Selected books ==
- Underdogs - Keegan Hirst, Batley and a Year in the Life of a Rugby League Town (2017) ISBN 0-5930774-9-0
- Slouching Towards Blubberhouses - A Grand Tour of Yorkshireness (2014) ISBN 0-9927036-4-6
- On Behalf of the Committee - A History of Northern Comedy (2010) ISBN 0-9560075-6-2
- Tries and Prejudice - The autobiography of England's first Muslim rugby international (2009, with Ikram Butt) ISBN 0-9560075-3-8
- Being Eddie Waring - The Life and Times of a Sporting Icon (2008) ISBN 1-84596-300-8

== TV and Radio ==
Hannan has made numerous radio and television appearances. Among the most notable are:

- It's Funny Up North with... Vic Reeves (ITV Tyne Tees 2006)
- Eddie Waring: Mr Rugby League (BBC Four, 2010)
- Eric and Ernie: Behind the Scenes (BBC Two, 2011)
- Morecambe and Wise: The Whole Story (BBC Two. 2013)

== Publishing ==
With fellow author and rugby league journalist Phil Caplan, Tony Hannan is a co-director of Scratching Shed Publishing, an independent publishing house based in Leeds, Yorkshire. Founded in May 2008, it is primarily devoted to the production of books inspired by aspects of northern English culture and produces the monthly rugby league magazine Forty20. .

== Cartoonist ==
Hannan was the creator and illustrator of the popular and long-running satirical cartoon character 'Walt', whose pithy comments were a nightly feature in the Bradford Telegraph and Argus newspaper from March 1987 until April 2002. Having first appeared alongside Brad Ford, a cheeky bear based on the 'Bradford's Bouncing Back' regeneration campaign figurehead of the late 1980s, Walt soon took over the strip. Hannan's cartoons have also appeared in Private Eye, Punch and similar publications.
