= Kris Radlinski =

Great Britain and England international rugby league footballer, coach and administrator

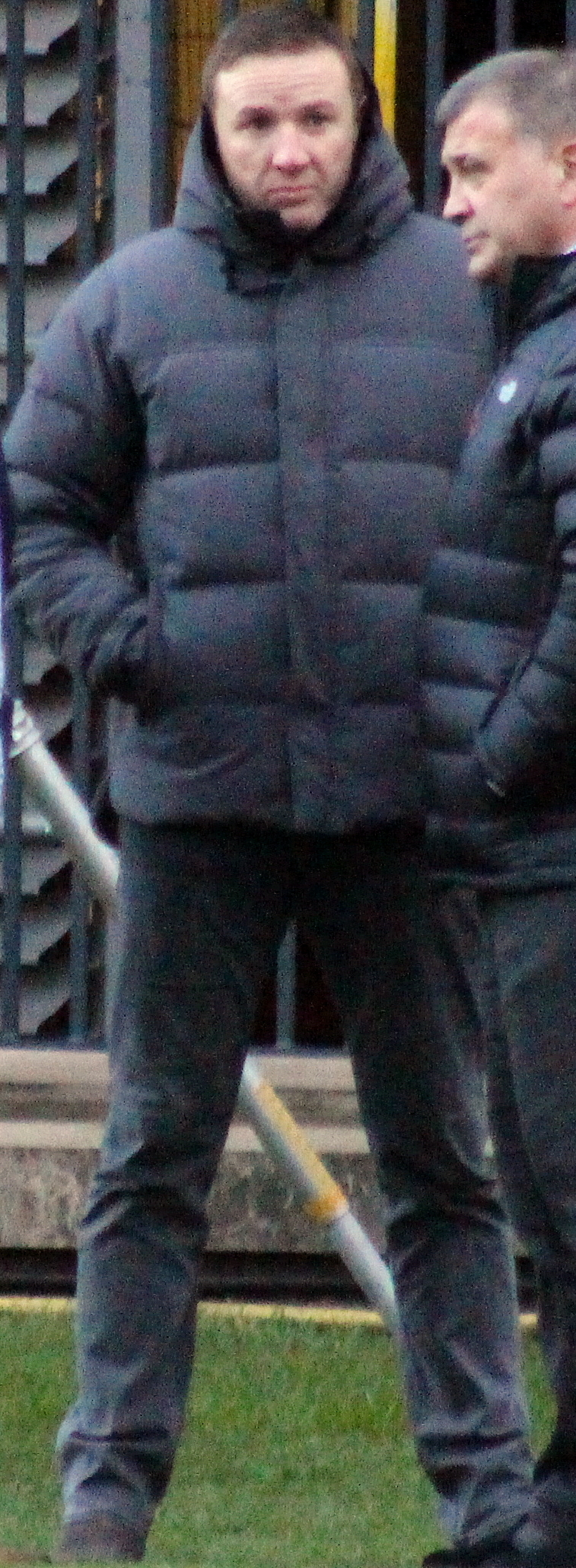

Personal information
- Full name: Kristian John Radlinski
- Born: 9 April 1976 (age 50) Wigan, Greater Manchester, England

Playing information
- Height: 6 ft 0 in (1.83 m)
- Weight: 14 st 2 lb (90 kg)
- Position: Fullback, Centre
Club
Years	Team	Pld	T	G	FG	P
1993–05	Wigan Warriors	316	183	1	0	734
2006	Wigan Warriors	6	0	0	0	0
	Total	322	183	1	0	734
Representative
Years	Team	Pld	T	G	FG	P
2001–03	Lancashire	3	3	0	0	12
1995–01	England	10	3	0	0	12
1996–03	Great Britain	20	5	0	0	20

Kristian John Radlinski MBE (born 9 April 1976) is an English rugby league executive who is CEO of the Wigan Warriors in the Super League and a former professional rugby league footballer.

He played his entire professional career for Wigan, making over 300 appearances between 1993 and 2006, playing mainly as a fullback. He also won 10 caps for England and 20 caps for Great Britain at international level.

== Background ==
Radlinski was born in Wigan, Greater Manchester, England. His family originated in Poland and have lived in Wigan since World War II.

== Playing career ==
=== Club career ===
Radlinski played for Wigan St Judes and Wigan St Patricks at amateur level. He signed for Wigan, his hometown club, in 1993, aged 17, and went on to play his entire professional career for them. He debuted for the first team as a substitute in October 1993 against Castleford.

He made his first start in November 1994, scoring a try in a 30–6 win against Featherstone Rovers. He spent most of the 1994–95 season playing on the wing, deputising for Jason Robinson or Martin Offiah if they were injured. In May 1995, at age 19, he scored a hat-trick in the 1995 Premiership final against Leeds, becoming the first player to do so in a Premiership final, and was also the youngest ever winner of the Harry Sunderland Trophy for man-of-the-match in Wigan's victory.

Radlinski played at centre and scored a try in Wigan's 25–16 victory over St Helens in the 1995–96 Regal Trophy Final during the 1995–96 season at Alfred McAlpine Stadium, Huddersfield on Saturday 13 January 1996.

Radlinski was a Premiership winner with Wigan, playing fullback in their 44–14 victory over St Helens in the Rugby League Premiership Final during Super League I at Old Trafford, Manchester on Sunday 8 September 1996.

Radlinski was named in the Super League Dream Team of 1998. He also appeared at fullback in Wigan's 1998 Super League Grand Final victory over Leeds Rhinos. Radlinski played for Wigan at centre in their 2000 Super League Grand Final defeat by St Helens.

Radlinski played at fullback in Wigan's 2001 Super League Grand Final loss against the Bradford Bulls. In the 2002 Challenge Cup Final at Murrayfield Stadium Radlinski won the Lance Todd Trophy for man of the match. Kris competed in this match despite being in hospital all week prior to Wigan's 21–12 victory over St Helens with a serious foot infection.

Radlinski played for Wigan at fullback in the 2003 Super League Grand Final defeat by Bradford Bulls.

He was given a testimonial year in 2005 for his loyal service to Wigan Warriors. Radlinski made only 15 appearances for the team during a season that was interrupted by multiple injuries. His testimonial match was played at the JJB Stadium on 2 February 2006 against the Huddersfield Giants. Wigan won this match 38–22.

Radlinski announced his retirement from the sport prematurely on 2 March 2006 due to persistent injuries. He had made over 300 appearances for Wigan, scoring 183 tries. This brought down the curtain on a successful career during which the player was a loyal servant to his club.

In June 2006 Radlinski came out of retirement and returned to Wigan for the remainder of 2006's Super League XI, playing for no payment to aid the team during their personnel struggles that year. He helped the club avoid relegation, making six appearances before retiring a second time in August 2006.

=== International career ===
Radlinski was selected to play for England in the 1995 World Cup Final at fullback in their defeat by Australia.

He won his first cap for Great Britain on the 1996 Lions tour. In the 1997 post season, Radlinski was selected to play for Great Britain at centre in all three matches of the Super League Test series against Australia.

Internationally he was capped 20 times by Great Britain, and won 10 England caps.

== Coaching and management ==
Durin the 2009 season, Radlinski returned to Wigan, taking up a scholarship coaching role. He was part of the England coaching staff for the 2009 Four Nations tournament. On 1 December 2009, Radlinski was appointed Rugby General Manager at Wigan, working alongside new head coach Michael Maguire.

In 2014, Radlinski was appointed an Executive Director of Wigan Warriors before being promoted to CEO on New Years Day 2023. Radlinski was a key figure in securing Wigan's place at the 2025 Rugby League Las Vegas event.

== Other work ==
Radlinski published his autobiography entitled Simply Rad in 2009.

== Honours ==
Club

- RFL Championship / Super League: 1994–95, 1995–96, 1998
- Premiership: 1994–95, 1996, 1997
- Regal Trophy: 1995–96
- Challenge Cup: 2002

Individual

- Harry Sunderland Trophy: 1995
- Lance Todd Trophy: 2002
- Roy Powell Medal: 2001
- Wigan Warriors Hall of Fame: Inducted 2022

Orders

- Member of the Order of the British Empire: 2007 Birthday Honours – For services to Rugby League
