= Albert Goldthorpe Medal =

Award

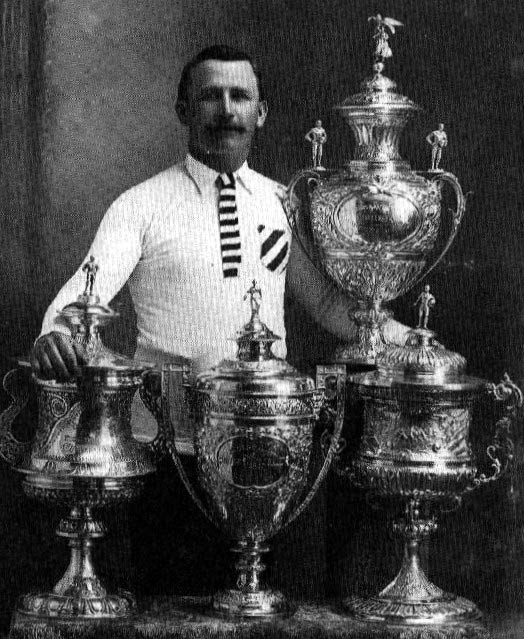
- Hunslet captain, Albert Goldthorpe, posing with "All Four Cups" in 1908
- Sport: Rugby league
- Competition: Super League
- Country: United Kingdom; France
- Presented by: Rugby Leaguer & League Express

History
- First award: 2008
- First winner: (Scotland) Danny Brough
- Most recent: (Australia) Bevan French (England) George Williams (joint winners)

The Albert Goldthorpe Medal is an award created by Rugby Leaguer & League Express to honour the leading players in the Super League. The award is named after Albert Goldthorpe, who is regarded as English rugby league's first superstar. The medal is solid gold and worth several thousand UK pounds, incorporating a photograph of Goldthorpe with "All Four Cups".

The award was introduced in the 2008 season to commemorate the centenary of the feat of Goldthorpe in leading Hunslet to become the first club to win all four major trophies in one season in 1908.

It is intended to parallel the 'Dally M Medal' named after the great Australian player Dally Messenger, which is awarded to the NRL player of the year by rugby league writers associated with the News Limited series of newspapers in Australia.

League Express reporters cast votes for the Albert Goldthorpe Medal after every Super League game in the regular season. The three players who, in the opinion of the reporters, have been the three 'best and fairest' players in the game will receive three points, two points and one point respectively. To be eligible for a vote, a player must not have been suspended from the competition at any stage during the season.

== Winners ==
Year	First	Second	Third
2008	(Scotland) Danny Brough (Scrum-half - Wakefield Trinity Wildcats)	(France) Thomas Bosc (Scrum-half - Dragons Catalans) (Australia) Michael Monaghan (Scrum-half - Warrington) (England) Leon Pryce (Stand-off - St. Helens)	
2009	(Australia) Michael Dobson (Scrum-half - Hull Kingston Rovers)	(Scotland) Danny Brough (Scrum-half - Wakefield Trinity Wildcats)	(Australia) Brett Hodgson (Fullback - Huddersfield)
2010	(Republic of Ireland) Pat Richards (Wing - Wigan) (England) Sam Tomkins (Stand-off - Wigan)		(England) Kevin Brown (Stand-off - Huddersfield)
2011	(New Zealand) Rangi Chase (Scrum-half - Castleford)	(England) Sam Tomkins (Fullback - Wigan)	(Australia) Scott Dureau (Scrum-half - Dragons Catalans)
2012	(Australia) Scott Dureau (Scrum-half - Dragons Catalans)	(Australia) Michael Dobson (Scrum-half - Hull Kingston Rovers) (Australia) Brett Finch (Stand-off - Wigan)	
2013	(Scotland) Danny Brough (Scrum-half - Huddersfield)	(England) Rangi Chase (Scrum-half - Castleford)	(Australia) Michael Dobson (Scrum-half - Hull Kingston Rovers)
2014	(Scotland) Danny Brough (Scrum-half - Huddersfield)	(England) Kevin Brown (Stand-off - Widnes)	(Australia) Travis Burns (Stand-off - Hull Kingston Rovers)
2015	(England) Luke Gale (Scrum-half - Castleford)	(Scotland) Danny Brough (Scrum-half - Huddersfield)	(Scotland) Ian Henderson (Hooker - Dragons Catalans) (England) Alex Walmsley (Prop - St. Helens)
2016	(England) Luke Gale (Scrum-half - Castleford)	(England) Marc Sneyd (Scrum-half - Hull F.C.)	(Samoa) Denny Solomona (Wing - Castleford)
2017	(England) Luke Gale (Scrum-half - Castleford)	(Australia) Robert Lui (Stand-off - Salford)	(Australia) Albert Kelly (Stand-off - Hull F.C.)
2018	(England) Stefan Ratchford (Fullback - Warrington)	(England) James Roby (Hooker - St. Helens) (England) Sam Tomkins (Fullback - Wigan)	
2019	(England) Jonny Lomax (Stand-off - St. Helens)	(Australia) Jackson Hastings (Scrum-half - Salford)	(Scotland) Lachlan Coote (Fullback - St. Helens)
2020–21	Not awarded		
2022	(Australia) Brodie Croft (Stand-off - Salford Red Devils)	(England) Sam Tomkins (Fullback - Catalans Dragons)	(Australia) Jai Field (Fullback - Wigan Warriors)
2023	(Australia) Bevan French (Stand-off - Wigan Warriors) (England) George Williams (Scrum-half - Warrington Wolves)		(Papua New Guinea) Lachlan Lam (Scrum-half - Leigh Leopards) (France) Benjamin Garcia (Loose forward - Catalans Dragons)
2024	(England) Marc Sneyd (Scrum-half - Salford Red Devils)		
2025	(Papua New Guinea) Lachlan Lam (Scrum-half - Leigh Leopards)	(England) Jake Connor (Stand-off - Leeds Rhinos)	(England) Mikey Lewis (Scrum-half - Hull Kingston Rovers)

== Other awards ==
=== Rookie of the Year ===
The League Express also award a Rookie of the Year medal annually. To be eligible for the award, players must have made fewer than ten appearances in the Super League or National Rugby League prior to the start of the season.

- 2008 Luke Burgess – Leeds Rhinos
- 2009 Sam Tomkins – Wigan Warriors
- 2010 Liam Watts – Hull Kingston Rovers
- 2011 Jermaine McGillvary – Huddersfield Giants
- 2012 John Bateman – Bradford Bulls
- 2013 Tom Lineham – Hull FC
- 2014 Joe Burgess – Wigan Warriors
- 2015 Andre Savelio – St Helens
- 2016 Max Jowitt – Wakefield Trinity
- 2017 Liam Marshall – Wigan Warriors
- 2018 Jake Trueman – Castleford Tigers
- 2019 Morgan Smithies – Wigan Warriors
- 2020 Matty Ashton – Warrington Wolves
- 2022 Lewis Murphy – Wakefield Trinity
- 2023 Edwin Ipape – Leigh Leopards

=== Team of the Year ===
- 2011 Warrington Wolves
- 2012 Wigan Warriors
- 2013 Huddersfield Giants
- 2014 Wigan Warriors
- 2015 Wigan Warriors

=== Career of the Year ===
Awarded to the years retirees:

- 2011 Robbie Paul – Bradford Bulls, Huddersfield Giants, Salford City Reds, Leigh Centurions
- 2012 Paul Sculthorpe – Warrington Wolves, St Helens
- 2013 Keith Senior – Sheffield Eagles, Leeds Rhinos / Steve Menzies – Catalan Dragons, Bradford Bulls, Manly Sea Eagles

=== Lifetime Achievement Award ===
- 2008 Francis Maloney
- 2009 Ray French
- 2010 Malcolm Alker
- 2011 Mike ‘Stevo’ Stephenson
- 2012 David Oxley
- 2013 Harry Jepson

=== Journalism Award ===
- 2012 Dave Hadfield
- 2013 Phil Caplan
