= 2012 Hull FC season =

- Super League XVII Rank: 6th
- Play-off result: N/A
- Challenge Cup: 4th Round
- 2012 record: Wins: 15; draws: 2; losses: 11
- Points scored: For: 712; against: 653

Team information
- Chairman: Adam Pearson
- Head Coach: Peter Gentle
- Captain: Andy Lynch
- Stadium: KC Stadium
- Avg. attendance: 12,402
- High attendance: 18,979

Top scorers
- Tries: Tom Briscoe - 21
- Goals: Danny Tickle - 80
- Points: Danny Tickle - 196
← 2011	List of seasons	2013 →

This article details the Hull F.C. rugby league football club's 2012 season. This is the seventeenth season of the Super League era.

== Season review ==
- Hull acquire new coach Peter Gentle from Wests Tigers.
- Lee Radford retires as a player and becomes an assistant coach at Hull.
- Shaun McRae and Andy Hay become assistant coaches for the club.
- Veteran Sean Long leaves Hull FC to become an assistant coach at Salford City Reds.
- Hull FC sign scrum-half Jamie Ellis from Leigh Centurions on a 2-year deal.
- Hull FC sign fullback Wade McKinnon from Wests Tigers on a 3-year deal.
- Hull FC sign hooker Aaron Heremaia on a 2-year deal and scrum half Brett Seymour on a 3-year deal from the New Zealand Warriors.
- Danny Washbrook and Ewan Dowes join Wakefield Trinity Wildcats on 3-year and 1 year deals.
- Epalahame Lauaki signs for Wigan Warriors on a 3-year deal.
- Youngster Luke Briscoe joins Leeds Rhinos on a 4-year deal.
- Veteran Craig Fitzgibbon retires from playing and joins Sydney Roosters as an assistant coach.
- Cameron Phelps and Martin Gleeson were both released from the club.
- Hull sign centre Tony Martin on a 1-year deal from Crusaders.
- Hull sign Martin Aspinwall from Castleford Tigers on a 1-year deal.
- Hull sign prop Eamon O'Carroll on a 3-year deal from Wigan Warriors.
- Hull sign prop Andy Lynch from Bradford Bulls on a 3-year deal.
- Hull sign Mike Burnett on a 1-year deal from London Broncos.
- Sam Obst joins Championship side Keighley Cougars on a 1-year deal.
- The 2012 Super League fixtures were announced and Hull FC will play Warrington Wolves at the KC Stadium in Round 1.
- Hull FC announce that they will play 3 pre-season friendlies - 21 Jan vs. York City Knights away, 22 Jan vs. Hull Kingston Rovers at home and 27–29 Jan vs. Bradford Bulls at home.
- Hull officially announce Andy Lynch as their captain for the 2012 season.
- Hull FC draw their Round 1 game 20–20 against Warrington Wolves.
- The Round 2 game against Catalans Dragons was postponed due to a frozen pitch.
- Hull beat London Broncos 22–14 in Round 3.
- Salford City Reds beat Hull 24–22 in Round 4.
- Hull beat Wakefield Trinity Wildcats 14–10 in Round 5.
- Hull beat St Helens R.F.C. 22–10 in Round 6.
- Hull hammer Widnes Vikings 58–10 in Round 7.
- Former Leeds Rhinos player Gareth Ellis signs for Hull on a 3-year deal.
- Hull beat Castleford Tigers 42–28 in Round 8.
- Hull defeat Bradford Bulls 24–18 in Round 9.
- Hull go top of the table by beating rivals Hull Kingston Rovers 36–6 in Round 10.
- Hull lose to Huddersfield Giants 22–4 in Round 11.
- Hull are knocked out of the Challenge Cup 42-16 by Huddersfield Giants in the 4th Round.
- Hull are heavily beating 56–12 in Round 12 by Wigan Warriors.
- Wade McKinnon left the club with immediate effect.
- Matty Russell joins the club on a one-month loan.
- Andy Lynch signs a new contract keeping him at the KC Stadium until 2014.
- Hull FC beat champions Leeds Rhinos 34–20 in Round 13.
- Hull FC beat London Broncos 14–12 in Round 14.
- Hull FC lose their Round 15 Magic Weekend encounter 32–30 against rivals Hull Kingston Rovers.
- Jordan Turner signs a 3 Year Deal with St Helens R.F.C. for the 2013 season.
- Hull F.C. announce the signing of Castleford Tigers centre Joe Arundel on a 4 Year Deal.
- Hull F.C. draw with St Helens R.F.C. 18–18 in Round 16.
- Hull F.C. lost 32–30 to Wakefield Trinity Wildcats in Round 17.
- Fullback Matty Russell signs a one-month extension to his loan.
- Hull F.C. sign prop Liam Watts from rivals Hull Kingston Rovers on a 3 1/2-year deal.
- Hull F.C. lost 40–18 to Warrington Wolves in Round 18.
- Prop Eamon O'Carroll moves to Widnes Vikings on an immediate 2 1/2-year deal.
- Hull narrowly beat Huddersfield Giants 28–24 in Round 19.
- Jamie Ellis is released and signs for Castleford Tigers whilst Ryan McGoldrick comes the opposite way and signs with the Black and Whites until the end of the year.
- Hull lose 21–6 to Leeds Rhinos in Round 20.
- Hull lose 44–14 to Catalans Dragons in Round 2.
- Hull sign St. Helens winger Jamie Foster on a months loan while Matty Russell goes back to Wigan Warriors.
- Hull beat rivals Hull Kingston Rovers 32–18 in Round 21.
- Hull beat Salford City Reds 36–24 in Round 22.
- Hull lose 48–10 to Wigan Warriors in Round 23.
- Hull beat Catalans Dragons 30–10 in Round 24.
- Hull lose 42–16 to Widnes Vikings in Round 25.
- Hull batter Bradford Bulls 70–6 in Round 26.
- Hull beat Castleford Tigers 36–10 in final weekly round game.
- Hull beat Huddersfield Giants 46–10 in the first playoff game.

== Pre season friendlies ==
LEGEND
Win
Draw
Loss

Dragons score is first.

Date	Competition	Vrs	H/A	Venue	Result	Score	Tries	Goals	Att	Report
21 January 2012	Pre Season	Knights	A	Huntington Stadium	W	32-30	Crooks (2), Ellis, Lineham, Briscoe, Cunningham	Crooks 4/6	N/A	Report
22 January 2012	Pre Season	Hull Kingston Rovers	H	KC Stadium	L	18-36	Lynch, Green, Martin	Tickle 2/2, Westerman 1/1	13,937	Report
29 January 2012	Pre Season	Bulls	H	KC Stadium	W	46-6	McKinnon (2), Yeaman (3), Briscoe, Horne, Tickle, Nicklas	Tickle 4/8, Radford 1/1	5,500 (Est.)	Report

== Player appearances ==
- Friendly Games Only

FB=Fullback	C=Centre	W=Winger	SO=Stand Off	SH=Scrum half	P=Prop	H=Hooker	SR=Second Row	LF=Loose forward	B=Bench

No	Player	1	2	3
1	Wade McKinnon	x	FB	FB
2	Will Sharp	x	W	W
3	Tony Martin	x	B	C
4	Kirk Yeaman	x	C	C
5	Tom Briscoe	x	C	W
6	Richard Horne	x	SO	SO
7	Brett Seymour	x	SH	SH
8	Mark O'Meley	x	B	B
9	Danny Houghton	x	H	H
10	Andy Lynch	x	P	x
11	Willie Manu	x	SR	SR
12	Danny Tickle	x	SR	SR
13	Joe Westerman	x	L	L
14	Aaron Heremaia	x	B	x
15	Richard Whiting	x	B	B
16	Eamon O'Carroll	x	B	B
17	Sam Moa	x	P	P
18	The Old Faithful	x	x	x
19	Jordan Turner	x	C	B
20	Jamie Ellis	SO	B	x
21	Reece Lyne	x	B	B
22	Martin Aspinwall	x	B	B
23	Ben Crooks	C	B	x
24	Liam Kent	SR	B	x
25	Liam Cunningham	C	x	x
26	Jack Briscoe	W	x	x
27	Chris Green	P	B	B
28	Danny Nicklas	SH	B	B
29	Laurence Pearce	x	x	B
30	Josh Bowden	P	x	x
31	James Cunningham	B	x	x
32	Lewis Brown	L	x	x
33	Mike Burnett	x	x	x

= Injured

= Suspended

== Table ==
Super League XVII
Pos	Team	Pld	W	D	L	PF	PA	PD	Pts	Qualification
1	Wigan Warriors (L)	27	21	0	6	994	449	+545	42	Play-offs
2	Warrington Wolves	27	20	1	6	909	539	+370	41	Play-offs
3	St Helens	27	17	2	8	795	480	+315	36	Play-offs
4	Catalans Dragons	27	18	0	9	812	611	+201	36	Play-offs
5	Leeds Rhinos (C)	27	16	0	11	823	662	+161	32	Play-offs
6	Hull F.C.	27	15	2	10	696	621	+75	32	Play-offs
7	Huddersfield Giants	27	14	0	13	699	664	+35	28	Play-offs
8	Wakefield Trinity Wildcats	27	13	0	14	633	764	−131	26	Play-offs
9	Bradford Bulls	27	14	1	12	633	756	−123	23 (Note: Bradford Bulls deducted 6 points on 25 July 2012 for entering administration)	
10	Hull Kingston Rovers	27	10	1	16	753	729	+24	21	
11	Salford City Reds	27	8	1	18	618	844	−226	17	
12	London Broncos	27	7	0	20	588	890	−302	14	
13	Castleford Tigers	27	6	0	21	554	948	−394	12	
14	Widnes Vikings	27	6	0	21	532	1082	−550	12	

Source: superleague.co.uk and BBC Sport.
Rules for classification: 1st on competition points; 2nd on match points difference.
Competition points: for win = 2; for draw = 1; for loss = 0.
(C) Champions; (L) League Leaders' Shield Winners

== 2012 fixtures and results ==
LEGEND
Win
Draw
Loss

2012 Engage Super League

Date	Competition	Rnd	Vrs	H/A	Venue	Result	Score	Tries	Goals	Att	Live on TV	Report
5 Feb 2012	Super League XVII	1	Wolves	H	KC Stadium	D	20-20	Yeaman, Tickle (2), Briscoe	Tickle 2/4	12,710	-	Report
19 February 2012	Super League XVII	3	Broncos	H	KC Stadium	W	22-14	Briscoe, Westerman, McKinnon, Yeaman	Tickle 3/4	10,096	Sky Sports	Report
24 February 2012	Super League XVII	4	Salford City Reds	A	City of Salford Stadium	L	22-24	Seymour (2), McKinnon, Briscoe	Tickle 3/4	5,186	-	Report
4 March 2012	Super League XVII	5	Wakefield Trinity Wildcats	H	KC Stadium	W	14-10	Yeaman, Sharp	Tickle 3/3	11,105	-	Report
9 March 2012	Super League XVII	6	Saints	A	Langtree Park	W	22-10	McKinnon (2), Turner	Tickle 5/6	14,875	-	Report
18 March 2012	Super League XVII	7	Vikings	H	KC Stadium	W	58-10	Tickle (4), Manu (2), Lynch, Whiting, Moa, Briscoe	Tickle 9/10	10,705	-	Report
25 March 2012	Super League XVII	8	Tigers	A	The Jungle	W	42-28	Moa, Manu (2), Turner, Tickle, Seymour, Briscoe	Tickle 7/7, Whiting 0/1	9,050	-	Report
30 March 2012	Super League XVII	9	Bulls	H	KC Stadium	W	24-18	Horne (2), Manu, Briscoe	Tickle 4/5	11,673	-	Report
6 April 2012	Super League XVII	10	Hull Kingston Rovers	H	KC Stadium	W	36-6	Radford, Turner (3), Yeaman, Seymour	Tickle 6/6	18,979	Sky Sports	Report
9 April 2012	Super League XVII	11	Giants	A	Galpharm Stadium	L	4-22	-	Tickle 2/2	9,950	-	Report
22 April 2012	Super League XVII	12	Warriors	H	KC Stadium	L	12-56	Ellis, Sharp	Tickle 2/2	11,549	-	Report
5 Map 2012	Super League XVII	13	Rhinos	H	KC Stadium	W	34-20	Tickle, Sharp, Briscoe (2), Crooks	Tickle 7/8	11,677	Sky Sports	Report
20 May 2012	Super League XVII	14	Broncos	A	Twickenham Stoop	W	14-12	Crooks, Whiting	Tickle 3/3	3,930	-	Report
26 May 2012	Super League XVII	15	Hull Kingston Rovers	N	Etihad Stadium	L	30-32	Seymour, Horne, Manu, Martin, Turner	Tickle 5/5	30,763	Sky Sports	Report
3 June 2012	Super League XVII	16	Saints	H	KC Stadium	D	18-18	Whiting, Horne, Tickle	Tickle 3/4	11,727	-	Report
10 June 2012	Super League XVII	17	Wakefield Trinity Wildcats	A	Belle Vue	L	30-32	Manu, Seymour, Crooks, Yeaman (2)	Tickle 5/6	8,986	-	Report
24 June 2012	Super League XVII	18	Wolves	A	Halliwell Jones Stadium	L	18-40	Yeaman, Manu, Westerman	Tickle 3/3	10,582	-	Report
1 July 2012	Super League XVII	19	Giants	H	KC Stadium	W	28-24	Crooks, Briscoe, Heremaia, Yeaman (2)	Tickle 4/5	11,142	-	Report
6 July 2012	Super League XVII	20	Rhinos	A	Headingley Stadium	L	6-21	Horne	Westerman 1/1	13,250	Sky Sports	Report
14 July 2012	Super League XVII	2	Dragons	A	Stade Gilbert Brutus	L	14-44	Crooks, Briscoe (2)	Westerman 1/3	7,388	-	Report
20 July 2012	Super League XVII	21	Hull Kingston Rovers	A	New Craven Park	W	32-18	McGoldrick, Turner, Yeaman, Whiting, Briscoe	Foster 6/7	9,086	Sky Sports	Report
29 July 2012	Super League XVII	22	Salford City Reds	H	KC Stadium	W	36-24	Lineham (2), Yeaman, Westerman, Turner	Foster 7/7	10,776	-	Report
3 August 2012	Super League XVII	23	Warriors	A	DW Stadium	L	10-48	Lineham, Seymour	Foster 1/2	17,736	Sky Sports	Report
12 August 2012	Super League XVII	24	Dragons	H	KC Stadium	W	30-10	Manu, Lineham, Green, Briscoe, Foster	Foster 5/5	10,765	-	Report
19 August 2012	Super League XVII	25	Vikings	A	Halton Stadium	L	16-42	Turner, Westerman, Heremaia	Foster 2/3	5,008	Sky Sports	Report
2 September 2012	Super League XVII	26	Bulls	A	Odsal Stadium	W	70-6	Westerman, Foster (2), Manu (2), Houghton, Heremaia (2), Briscoe (3), Crooks, Lynch	Foster 9/13	10,616	Sky Sports	Report
9 September 2012	Super League XVII	27	Tigers	H	KC Stadium	W	36-10	Manu, Briscoe, Horne, Houghton, O'Meley, Green	Foster 6/6	11,607	-	Report

== Player appearances ==
- Super League Only

FB=Fullback	C=Centre	W=Winger	SO=Stand-off	SH=Scrum half	PR=Prop	H=Hooker	SR=Second Row	L=Loose forward	B=Bench

No	Player	1	2	3	4	5	6	7	8	9	10	11	12	13	14	15	16	17	18	19	20	21	22	23	24	25	26	27
1	Wade McKinnon	FB	x	FB	FB	FB	FB	FB	FB	x	FB	FB	FB	x	x	x	x	x	x	x	x	x	x	x	x	x	x	x
2	Will Sharp	W	x	W	W	W	W	W	W	W	W	W	W	W	W	W	W	x	x	x	x	x	x	x	x	x	x	x
3	Tony Martin	C	x	C	C	C	C	C	C	C	x	C	x	x	x	C	x	x	x	x	x	x	x	x	x	x	x	x
4	Kirk Yeaman	C	C	C	C	C	C	x	x	x	C	C	x	x	x	x	x	C	C	C	C	C	C	C	x	x	x	C
5	Tom Briscoe	W	W	W	W	W	W	W	W	W	W	W	W	W	W	W	W	W	W	W	W	W	FB	FB	FB	FB	W	W
6	Richard Horne	SO	SO	SO	SO	SO	SO	SO	SO	FB	SO	x	x	x	B	SO	SO	x	SO	FB	SO	SO	x	x	x	B	FB	FB
7	Brett Seymour	x	SH	SH	SH	SH	SH	SH	SH	SH	SH	SH	x	SH	SH	SH	SH	SH	SH	SH	SH	x	x	SH	SH	SH	B	SO
8	Mark O'Meley	P	x	B	P	P	P	x	x	x	x	x	x	B	x	x	x	x	x	x	x	x	P	B	P	B	B	B
9	Danny Houghton	H	x	H	H	H	H	H	H	H	H	H	H	H	H	H	H	H	H	x	x	H	H	x	H	H	H	H
10	Andy Lynch	P	P	P	P	P	P	P	P	P	P	P	P	P	P	P	P	P	P	P	P	P	B	P	B	P	P	P
11	Willie Manu	SR	SR	SR	SR	SR	SR	SR	SR	SR	SR	SR	SR	SR	SR	SR	SR	SR	SR	SR	B	SR	SR	SR	SR	SR	SR	SR
12	Danny Tickle	SR	x	SR	SR	SR	SR	SR	SR	SR	SR	SR	SR	SR	SR	SR	SR	SR	SR	SR	x	x	x	x	x	x	x	B
13	Joe Westerman	L	L	B	x	x	x	x	x	x	x	x	x	x	B	B	L	L	L	L	SR	SR	SR	SR	x	SR	SR	SR
14	Aaron Heremaia	x	H	x	x	x	x	x	x	x	x	x	x	x	x	x	x	x	B	H	H	SH	SH	H	B	B	SH	SH
15	Richard Whiting	B	SR	B	B	B	L	B	B	B	L	L	B	SO	SO	x	B	B	H	SO	L	L	x	C	SR	x	x	x
16	Eamon O'Carroll	x	x	x	x	B	B	B	B	P	x	x	x	B	B	B	B	B	x	x	x	x	x	x	x	x	x	x
17	Sam Moa	B	x	P	x	B	B	P	P	x	x	x	P	P	P	P	P	P	P	P	x	x	x	x	x	x	x	x
18	The Old Faithful	x	x	x	x	x	x	x	x	x	x	x	x	x	x	x	x	x	x	x	x	x	x	x	x	x	x	x
19	Jordan Turner	B	C	x	B	x	B	C	C	C	C	C	x	C	C	C	C	C	C	C	C	C	C	x	C	C	C	x
20	Jamie Ellis	x	x	x	x	B	B	B	B	SO	B	SO	SH	B	x	x	x	SO	x	x	x	x	x	x	x	x	x	x
21	Reece Lyne	x	x	x	x	x	x	x	x	x	x	x	x	x	x	x	x	x	x	x	x	x	x	x	x	x	x	x
22	Martin Aspinwall	B	B	L	L	L	x	L	L	L	B	B	x	B	B	B	B	B	B	B	B	B	L	B	L	B	B	B
23	Ben Crooks	x	W	x	x	x	x	x	x	x	x	x	C	C	C	x	C	W	W	W	W	x	x	x	C	C	C	C
24	Liam Kent	x	x	x	x	x	x	x	x	B	x	B	B	x	x	B	x	x	B	x	x	x	x	x	x	x	x	x
25	Liam Cunningham	x	B	x	x	x	x	x	x	x	x	x	x	x	x	x	x	x	x	x	x	x	x	x	x	x	x	x
26	Jack Briscoe	x	x	x	x	x	x	x	x	x	x	x	x	x	x	x	x	x	x	x	x	x	x	x	x	x	x	x
27	Chris Green	x	B	x	x	x	x	x	x	B	x	x	x	x	x	x	x	x	x	x	x	B	B	B	B	x	B	B
28	Danny Nicklas	SH	x	B	B	x	x	x	x	x	x	x	SO	x	x	x	x	x	x	B	B	x	B	B	x	x	x	x
29	Laurence Pearce	x	x	x	x	x	x	x	x	x	x	x	x	x	x	x	x	x	x	x	x	x	x	x	x	x	x	x
30	Josh Bowden	x	x	x	B	x	x	B	B	B	B	B	B	x	x	x	x	x	x	x	x	x	x	x	x	x	x	x
31	James Cunningham	x	x	x	x	x	x	x	x	x	x	x	x	x	x	x	x	x	x	x	x	x	x	x	x	x	x	x
32	Lewis Brown	x	x	x	x	x	x	x	x	x	x	x	x	x	x	x	x	x	x	x	x	x	x	x	x	x	x	x
33	Mike Burnett	x	x	x	x	x	x	x	x	x	x	x	x	x	x	x	x	x	x	x	x	x	x	x	x	x	x	x
34	Jay Pitts	x	B	x	x	x	x	x	x	x	B	B	L	L	L	L	B	B	B	B	SR	B	B	B	B	L	L	L
35	Lee Radford	x	x	x	x	x	x	x	x	x	P	P	B	x	x	x	x	x	x	x	B	x	x	x	x	x	x	x
36	Matty Russell	x	x	x	x	x	x	x	x	x	x	x	x	FB	FB	FB	FB	FB	FB	x	x	x	x	x	x	x	x	x
37	Liam Watts	x	P	x	x	x	x	x	x	x	x	x	x	x	x	x	x	x	x	B	P	P	P	P	P	P	P	P
38	Ryan McGoldrick	x	FB	x	x	x	x	x	x	x	x	x	x	x	x	x	x	x	x	x	FB	FB	SO	SO	SO	SO	SO	x
39	Tom Lineham	x	x	x	x	x	x	x	x	x	x	x	x	x	x	x	x	x	x	x	x	B	W	W	W	W	x	x
40	Jamie Foster	x	x	x	x	x	x	x	x	x	x	x	x	x	x	x	x	x	x	x	x	W	W	W	W	W	W	W

= Injured

= Suspended

== Challenge Cup ==
LEGEND
Win
Draw
Loss

Date	Competition	Rnd	Vrs	H/A	Venue	Result	Score	Tries	Goals	Att	TV	Report
15 April 2012	Cup	4th	Giants	H	KC Stadium	L	16-42	Briscoe (2)	Tickle 4/4	8,327	-	Report

== Player appearances ==
- Challenge Cup Games only

FB=Fullback	C=Centre	W=Winger	SO=Stand Off	SH=Scrum half	PR=Prop	H=Hooker	SR=Second Row	L=Loose forward	B=Bench

No	Player	4
1	Wade McKinnon	x
2	Will Sharp	W
3	Tony Martin	C
4	Kirk Yeaman	x
5	Tom Briscoe	W
6	Richard Horne	x
7	Brett Seymour	SH
8	Mark O'Meley	x
9	Danny Houghton	H
10	Andy Lynch	P
11	Willie Manu	SR
12	Danny Tickle	SR
13	Joe Westerman	x
14	Aaron Heremaia	x
15	Richard Whiting	B
16	Eamon O'Carroll	x
17	Sam Moa	P
18	The Old Faithful	x
19	Jordan Turner	C
20	Jamie Ellis	SO
21	Reece Lyne	FB
22	Martin Aspinwall	x
23	Ben Crooks	B
24	Liam Kent	B
25	Liam Cunningham	x
26	Jack Briscoe	x
27	Chris Green	B
28	Danny Nicklas	x
29	Laurence Pearce	x
30	Josh Bowden	x
31	James Cunningham	x
32	Lewis Brown	x
33	Mike Burnett	x
34	Jay Pitts	L

== Playoffs ==
LEGEND
Win
Draw
Loss

Date	Competition	Rnd	Vrs	H/A	Venue	Result	Score	Tries	Goals	Att	TV	Report
16 September 2012	Play-offs	QF	Giants	H	KC Stadium	W	46-10	Briscoe (2), Foster (2), Watts, Heremaia, Lynch, Horne	Foster 7/9	8,662	Sky Sports	Report
22 September 2012	Play-offs	PSF	Wolves	A	Halliwell Jones Stadium	L	12-24	Briscoe, Crooks	Foster 2/2	7,323	Sky Sports	Report

== Player appearances ==
- Play Off Games only

FB=Fullback	C=Centre	W=Winger	SO=Stand Off	SH=Scrum half	PR=Prop	H=Hooker	SR=Second Row	L=Loose forward	B=Bench

No	Player	QF	PSF	SF	GF
2	Will Sharp	x	x		
3	Tony Martin	x	x		
4	Kirk Yeaman	C	C		
5	Tom Briscoe	W	W		
6	Richard Horne	FB	FB		
7	Brett Seymour	SO	SO		
8	Mark O'Meley	B	B		
9	Danny Houghton	H	H		
10	Andy Lynch	P	P		
11	Willie Manu	SR	SR		
12	Danny Tickle	x	x		
13	Joe Westerman	SR	SR		
14	Aaron Heremaia	SH	SH		
15	Richard Whiting	x	x		
17	Sam Moa	x	x		
18	The Old Faithful	x	x		
19	Jordan Turner	C	C		
21	Reece Lyne	x	x		
22	Martin Aspinwall	L	L		
23	Ben Crooks	B	B		
24	Liam Kent	x	x		
25	Liam Cunningham	x	x		
26	Jack Briscoe	x	x		
27	Chris Green	B	B		
28	Danny Nicklas	x	x		
29	Laurence Pearce	x	x		
30	Josh Bowden	x	x		
31	James Cunningham	x	x		
32	Lewis Brown	x	x		
33	Mike Burnett	x	x		
34	Jay Pitts	B	B		
35	Lee Radford	x	x		
37	Liam Watts	P	P		
38	Ryan McGoldrick	x	x		
39	Tom Lineham	x	x		
40	Jamie Foster	W	W		

== 2012 squad statistics ==
- Appearances and Points include (Super League, Challenge Cup and Play Offs) as of 23 September 2012.

No	Nat	Player	Position	Age	Previous club	Contracted Until	Apps	Tries	Goals	DG	Points
1	(Australia)	Wade McKinnon	Fullback	30	New Zealand Warriors	2014	10	4	0	0	16
2	(England)	Will Sharp	Wing	25	Harlequins RL	N/A	16	3	0	0	12
3	(Australia)	Tony Martin	Centre	33	Crusaders	N/A	11	1	0	0	4
4	(England)	Kirk Yeaman	Centre	28	Hull FC Academy	N/A	18	11	0	0	44
5	(England)	Tom Briscoe	Wing	21	Hull FC Academy	N/A	30	22	0	0	90
6	(England)	Richard Horne	Stand off	29	Hull FC Academy	N/A	22	7	0	0	28
7	(Australia)	Brett Seymour	Scrum half	27	New Zealand Warriors	2014	26	7	0	0	28
8	(Australia)	Mark O'Meley	Prop	30	Sydney Roosters	2012	14	1	0	0	4
9	(England)	Danny Houghton	Hooker	23	Hull FC Academy	2012	26	2	0	0	8
10	(England)	Andy Lynch	Prop	32	Bradford Bulls	2013	30	3	0	0	12
11	(Tonga)	Willie Manu	Second row	31	Castleford Tigers	2012	30	12	0	0	48
12	(England)	Danny Tickle	Second row	28	Wigan Warriors	2012	20	9	80	0	196
13	(England)	Joe Westerman	Loose forward	22	Castleford Tigers	2014	18	5	2	0	24
14	(New Zealand)	Aaron Heremaia	Hooker	29	New Zealand Warriors	2013	13	5	0	0	20
15	(England)	Richard Whiting	Centre	27	Featherstone Rovers	2012	23	4	0	0	16
16	(Republic of Ireland)	Eamon O'Carroll	Prop	24	Wigan Warriors	2014	10	0	0	0	0
17	(Tonga)	Sam Moa	Prop	25	Cronulla Sharks	2012	15	2	0	0	8
18	(England)	The Old Faithful	N/A	N/A	Hull FC	2012	0	0	0	0	0
19	(England)	Jordan Turner	Centre	23	Salford City Reds	2012	25	9	0	0	36
20	(England)	Jamie Ellis	Half back	22	Leigh Centurions	2012	12	1	0	0	4
21	(England)	Reece Lyne	Winger	19	Hull FC Academy	2012	1	0	0	0	0
22	(England)	Martin Aspinwall	Second row	30	Castleford Tigers	2012	26	0	0	0	0
23	(England)	Ben Crooks	Centre	18	Hull FC Academy	2012	16	7	0	0	28
24	(England)	Liam Kent	Second row	18	Hull FC Academy	2012	6	0	0	0	0
25	(England)	Liam Cunningham	Centre	18	Hull FC Academy	2012	0	0	0	0	0
26	(England)	Jack Briscoe	Fullback	18	Hull FC Academy	2012	0	0	0	0	0
27	(England)	Chris Green	Second row	18	Hull FC Academy	2012	11	2	0	0	8
28	(England)	Danny Nicklas	Halfback	20	Hull FC Academy	2012	8	0	0	0	0
29	(England)	Laurence Pearce	Second row	18	Hull FC Academy	2012	0	0	0	0	0
30	(England)	Josh Bowden	Prop	18	Hull FC Academy	2012	7	0	0	0	0
31	(England)	James Cunningham	Hooker	18	Hull FC Academy	2012	1	0	0	0	0
32	(England)	Lewis Brown	Centre	18	Hull FC Academy	2012	0	0	0	0	0
33	(England)	Mike Burnett	Second row	23	Hull FC Academy	2012	0	0	0	0	0
34	(England)	Jay Pitts	Prop	N/A	Leeds Rhinos - Loan	2012	22	0	0	0	0
35	(England)	Lee Radford	Prop	N/A	Hull FC	2012	4	1	0	0	4
36	(England)	Matty Russell	Fullback	18	Wigan Warriors - Loan	2012	6	0	0	0	0
37	(England)	Liam Watts	Prop	N/A	Hull Kingston Rovers	2014	12	1	0	0	4
38	(Australia)	Ryan McGoldrick	Fullback	N/A	Castleford Tigers	2012	8	1	0	0	4
39	(England)	Tom Lineham	Wing	N/A	Hull FC	2012	5	4	0	0	16
40	(England)	Jamie Foster	Wing	23	St. Helens - Loan	2012	9	5	45	0	110

= Injured = Suspended

== Out of contract 2012 ==
Players out of contract in 2012:

== 2012 transfers in/out ==
In

	Name	Position	Signed from	Date
(Australia)	Brett Seymour	Scrum half	New Zealand Warriors	-
(England)	Andy Lynch	Prop	Bulls	-

Out

	Name	Position	Club Signed	Date
(England)	Danny Washbrook	Loose forward	Wakefield Trinity Wildcats	-
