= 2008 Challenge Cup final =

Rugby league match in the United Kingdom

2008 Challenge Cup Final
| St. Helens | Hull |
|---|---|
| 28 | 16 |
| | 1 | 2 | Total |
|---|---|---|---|
| STH | 10 | 18 | 28 |
| HUL | 0 | 16 | 16 |
- Date: 30 August 2008
- Stadium: Wembley Stadium
- Location: London, United Kingdom
- Lance Todd Trophy winner: Paul Wellens
- God Save The Queen and Abide with Me: Sabrina Washington
- Referee: Steve Ganson
- Attendance: 82,821

Broadcast partners
- Broadcasters: BBC Sport
- Commentators: Ray French

The 2008 Challenge Cup Final was the final game of the 2008 Challenge Cup, also known as The Carnegie Challenge Cup for sponsorship reasons. The match was contested by two Super League teams: the defending champions St. Helens, and Hull F.C.

The final was performed at Wembley Stadium on 30 August 2008, started at 14:30 BST. St Helens won the match 28-16 after a topsy-turvy game, ahead by 10 points at half time, then went 12-10 before roaring back to win by a clear margin.

== Route to the final ==
=== St Helens ===
St Helens as a Super League club entered the competition in the fourth round. St Helens started by thrashing National League Two side London Skolars 56-0. In Round 5 St Helens narrowly beat fellow Super League side Warrington Wolves by 40–34. In the quarter finals, St Helens again recorded narrow victory against Hull KR, winning by 24 points to 18. The first semi-final between St Helens and Leeds Rhinos finished 26-16 sending St Helens to the final.

| Round | Opposition | Score |
|---|---|---|
| 4th | London Skolars (H) | 56–0 |
| 5th | Warrington Wolves (H) | 40–34 |
| QF | Hull KR (A) | 34–18 |
| SF | Leeds Rhinos (N) | 26–16 |

=== Hull F.C. ===
Hull F.C. as Super League club also entered the competition in the fourth round. Hull F.C. started by thrashing National League Two side Rochdale Hornets 42-5. In Round 5 Hull comfortably beat National League One side Widnes. In the quarter finals, Hull recorded a narrow victory against Bradford, winning by 22 to 16. The second semi-final between Hull and Wakefield Trinity Wildcats saw a victory of 32-24 to place Hull into the final.

| Round | Opposition | Score |
|---|---|---|
| 4th | Rochdale Hornets (A) | 42–5 |
| 5th | Widnes Vikings (A) | 32–18 |
| QF | Bradford Bulls (A) | 22–16 |
| SF | Wakefield Trinity Wildcats (N) | 32–24 |

== Match details ==
30 August 2008

| St. Helens | 28 v 16 | Hull F.C. |
|---|---|---|
| Tries: Gidley 8' m Meli 18' c, 65' c Wilkin 71' c Pryce 78' c Goals: Long (4) | Report | Tries: Yeaman 44' c, 63' c Raynor 74' m Goals: Tickle (2) |

Wembley Stadium, London
Attendance: 82,821
Referee: Steve Ganson
Player of the Match: Paul Wellens

Teams:

St Helens: Paul Wellens, Ade Gardner, Matthew Gidley, Willie Talau, Francis Meli, Leon Pryce, Sean Long, Bryn Hargreaves, Keiron Cunningham, James Graham, Chris Flannery, Jon Wilkin, Paul Sculthorpe
Replacements: James Roby, Lee Gilmour, Paul Clough, Maurie Fa'asavalu Coach: Daniel Anderson

Hull: Todd Byrne, Matt Sing, Graeme Horne, Kirk Yeaman, Gareth Raynor, Danny Washbrook, Tommy Lee, Ewan Dowes, Shaun Berrigan, Peter Cusack, Willie Manu, Danny Tickle, Lee Radford (c),
Replacements: Richard Horne, Garreth Carvell, Tom Briscoe, Jamie Thackray Coach: Richard Agar
