= Michael Burnett =

Michael Burnett may refer to:

- Mikey Burnett, American mixed martial artist
- Mike Burnett, English rugby league player
- Michael Burnett (Doctors), a fictional character
