= Sid Domic =

Australian rugby league footballer

Personal information
- Born: 8 February 1975 (age 51) Rockhampton, Queensland, Australia

Playing information
- Height: 5 ft 10 in (1.78 m)
- Weight: 14 st 11 lb (94 kg)
- Position: Utility
Club
Years	Team	Pld	T	G	FG	P
1993–94	Brisbane Broncos	4	0	0	0	0
1994–95	London Broncos	19	8	0	0	32
1997–01	Penrith Panthers	88	16	0	0	64
2001–04	Warrington Wolves	48	17	0	0	68
2004–05	Wakefield Trinity Wildcats	51	33	0	0	132
2005–07	Hull FC	45	16	0	0	64
2007	Dewsbury Rams	2	0	0	0	0
	Total	257	90	0	0	360

Sid Domic (born 8 February 1975) is an Australian former professional rugby league footballer who played in the 1990s and 2000s. He played in several positions for several clubs. Domic played in Australia for the Brisbane Broncos and the Penrith Panthers, and in England for the London Broncos, the Warrington Wolves, the Wakefield Trinity Wildcats, and Hull FC.

== Background ==
Of Aboriginal and Croatian descent, while attending North Rockhampton State High School, Domic played for the Australian Schoolboys team in 1991 and 1992.

== Professional playing career ==
Domic went on to play for the Brisbane Broncos and Penrith Panthers in the New South Wales Rugby League premiership and NRL before moving to England.

His Super League days have taken him from Warrington, Wakefield Trinity and Hull FC

Domic scored the winning try at the first local derby to be played in the Super League between Hull F.C. and their local rivals Hull Kingston Rovers. Hull F.C. reached the 2006 Super League Grand final contested with St. Helens and Domic played as a centre, scoring his side's sole try in their 4–26 loss.

Domic was released from the Hull FC quota on 26 June to allow Mathew Head to play for the club.

In 2008, he joined the Dewsbury Rams.

== Post-playing ==
In 2010 Domic's artistic ability led him to be selected from a field of six artists to design the Indigenous All Stars' jersey, as well as Johnathan Thurston's custom headgear, for the annual NRL All Stars matches. Much of his own knowledge in this area has been passed down to him from his grandmother, Ivy Domic. Through his fame from his playing career, he has visited children at many schools to introduce them to Aboriginal culture and his work has been exhibited at the Rebecca Hossack Gallery in the U.K.
