= 2006 Super League Grand Final =

St. Helens	Hull
26	4
	1	2	Total
ST H	10	16	26
HUL	4	0	4
- Date: 14 October 2006
- Stadium: Old Trafford
- Location: (England) Manchester
- Harry Sunderland Trophy: (England) Paul Wellens ( St Helens)
- Headliners: Deacon Blue
- Referee: Karl Kirkpatrick
- Attendance: 72,575

Broadcast partners
- Broadcasters: Sky Sports
- Commentators: Eddie Hemmings; Mike Stephenson

The 2006 Super League Grand Final was the ninth official grand final and conclusive and championship-deciding game of Super League XI. Held on Saturday, 14 October at Manchester's Old Trafford ground, the game was played between St. Helens, who finished top of the league after the 28 weekly rounds, and Hull FC, who finished second after the weekly rounds.

== Background ==
	Team	Pld	W	D	L	PF	PA	PD	Pts
1	St. Helens	28	24	0	4	939	430	+509	48
2	Hull	28	20	0	8	720	578	+142	40

=== Route to the Final ===
==== St Helens ====
Round	Opposition	Score
Qualifying Semi-Final	Hull F.C. (H)	12–8
Key: (H) = Home venue; (A) = Away venue; (N) = Neutral venue.

==== Hull FC ====
Round	Opposition	Score
Qualifying Semi-Final	St Helens (A)	12–8
Elimination Final	Bradford Bulls (H)	19–12
Key: (H) = Home venue; (A) = Away venue; (N) = Neutral venue.

== Match details ==
14 October 2006
18:00 UTC+1

St. Helens	26 - 4	Hull F.C.
Tries: Meli 18'; Pryce 39'; Talau 50'; Gardner 53'; Cunningham 62'; Goals: Lyon (3)	Report	Tries: Domic 24'

Old Trafford, Manchester
Attendance: 72,575
Referee: Karl Kirkpatrick (Warrington)

St Helens		Position	Hull FC	
1	(England) Paul Wellens	Fullback	1	(England) Shaun Briscoe
2	(England) Ade Gardner	Winger	14	(Samoa) Motu Tony
3	(Australia) Jamie Lyon	Centre	4	(Australia) Sid Domic
4	(Samoa) Willie Talau	Centre	3	(England) Kirk Yeaman
5	(Samoa) Francis Meli	Winger	5	(England) Gareth Raynor
6	(England) Leon Pryce	Stand Off	13	(England) Paul Cooke
7	(England) Sean Long (c)	Scrum half	7	(England) Richard Horne
17	(England) Paul Anderson	Prop	8	(England) Ewan Dowes
9	(Wales) Keiron Cunningham	Hooker	9	(New Zealand) Richard Swain (c)
10	(New Zealand) Jason Cayless	Prop	10	(England) Garreth Carvell
11	(England) Lee Gilmour	2nd Row	12	(England) Shayne McMenemy
12	(England) Jon Wilkin	2nd Row	11	(England) Lee Radford
16	(Australia) Jason Hooper	Loose forward	24	(England) Danny Washbrook
14	(England) James Roby	Interchange	6	(England) Richard Whiting
19	(England) James Graham	Interchange	19	(England) Graeme Horne
15	(England) Mike Bennett	Interchange	26	(England) Scott Wheeldon
23	(Samoa) Maurie Fa'asavalu	Interchange	15	(England) Paul King
	(Australia) Daniel Anderson	Coach		(Australia) Peter Sharp

== See also ==
- Super League XI
