= Graeme Horne =

England & Scotland international rugby league footballer

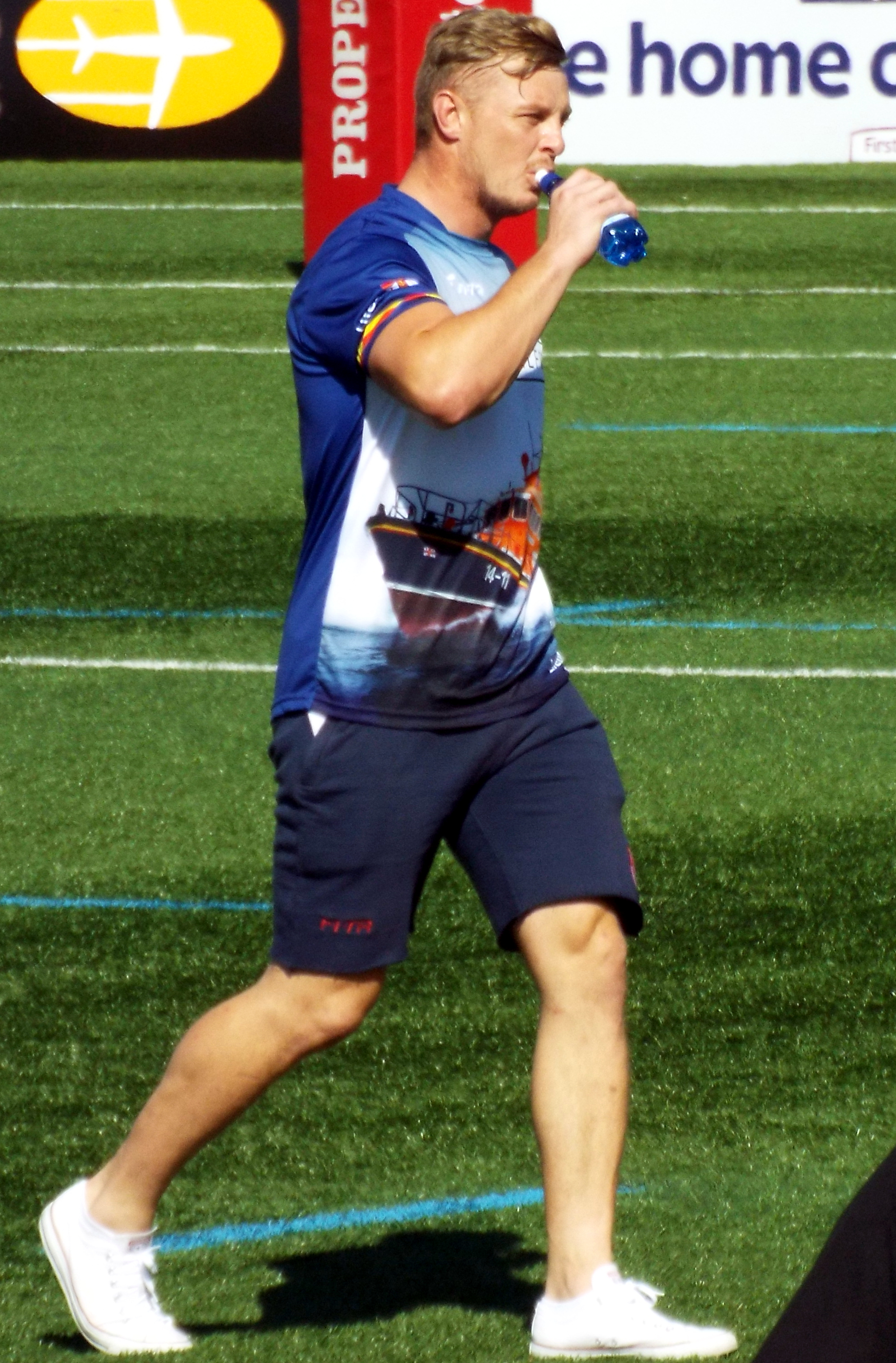

Personal information
- Full name: Graeme Horne
- Born: 22 March 1985 (age 41) Hull, Humberside, England

Playing information
- Height: 6 ft 0 in (183 cm)
- Weight: 16 st 5 lb (104 kg)
- Position: Second-row, Centre
Club
Years	Team	Pld	T	G	FG	P
2002–09	Hull FC	128	23	0	0	92
2010–11	Huddersfield Giants	41	11	0	0	44
2012–17	Hull Kingston Rovers	87	17	0	0	68
2017(loan)	→ York City Knights	2	0	0	0	0
2018–20	York City Knights	45	13	0	0	52
2020	Doncaster	3	0	0	0	0
	Total	306	64	0	0	256
Representative
Years	Team	Pld	T	G	FG	P
2006	England	2	0	0	0	0
- Relatives: Richard Horne (brother)

Graeme Horne (born 22 March 1985) is an English former rugby league footballer who last played as a second-row forward for the Doncaster R.L.F.C. in the Championship. He retired at the end of the 2020 season.

He previously played for Hull FC, Huddersfield Giants and Hull Kingston Rovers.

== Background ==
Horne was born in Kingston upon Hull, Humberside, England.

He is the younger brother of former Great Britain international Richard Horne.

== Playing career ==
=== Club career ===
==== Hull FC ====
Horne signed for Hull F.C. when he was 17 years old, making his Super League début in 2003. He missed out on the matchday squad for their 2005 Challenge Cup Final victory, but did play at Wembley Stadium in the Challenge Cup Final against St. Helens in 2008.

Hull reached the 2006 Super League Grand final to be contested against St. Helens, and Horne played from the interchange bench in his side's 4-26 loss.

==== Huddersfield Giants ====
He left Hull in 2010 to join Huddersfield, playing for two seasons before returning to the city of Hull to join Hull Kingston Rovers.

==== Hull KR ====
Horne joined Hull KR from the 2012 season.

==== York City Knights ====
In November 2017 Horne signed a one-year deal with York having previously played for the club on dual registration.

==== Doncaster ====
Horne joined Doncaster in December 2019 to be coached by his brother Richard making his debut on 23 Feb 2020 in the Challenge Cup defeat 12-22 to Workington Town; playing at loose forward.

== International career ==
=== England ===
Horne played two games for England in 2006.
