= Paul King (rugby league) =

GB & England international rugby league footballer

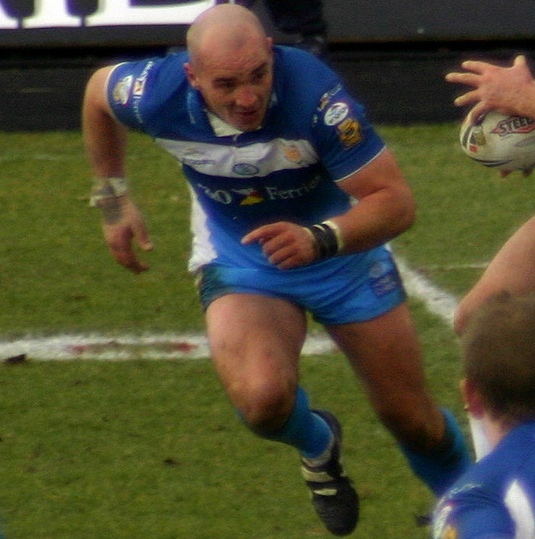

Personal information
- Born: 28 June 1979 (age 46) Kingston upon Hull, Humberside, England

Playing information
- Height: 6 ft 1 in (1.86 m)
- Weight: 17 st 11 lb (113 kg)
- Position: Prop, Hooker, Second-row
Club
Years	Team	Pld	T	G	FG	P
1998–09	Hull F.C.	252	21	0	1	85
2010–11	Wakefield Trinity Wildcats	32	1	0	1	5
2012	York City Knights	12	1	0	0	4
	Total	296	23	0	2	94
Representative
Years	Team	Pld	T	G	FG	P
2001–02	Yorkshire	3	0	0	0	0
2001	England	1	0	0	0	0
2001	Great Britain	1	1	0	0	4

Paul King (born 28 June 1979) is an English former professional rugby league footballer who played in the 1990s, 2000s and 2010s. He played at representative level for Great Britain and England, and at club level in the Super League for Hull FC and the Wakefield Trinity Wildcats, and in the Co-operative Championship for the York City Knights, as a prop, hooker or second-row.

== Background ==
King was born in Kingston upon Hull, Humberside. He was a pupil at Sydney Smith School in the city.

== Playing career ==
=== Club career ===
King made his first team debut for Hull in 1998. He played for Hull in the 2005 Challenge Cup Final from the interchange bench in their victory against the Leeds Rhinos. Hull reached the 2006 Super League Grand final to be contested against St. Helens, and King played from the interchange bench in his side's 4-26 loss.

After being released by Hull at the end of the 2009 season, he joined Wakefield Trinity Wildcats.

In October 2011, he signed a one-year contract with York City Knights.

=== International honours ===
King won a cap for England while at Hull in 2001 against Wales (sub), and won a cap for Great Britain while at Hull in 2001 against France.
