= 2005 Challenge Cup =

Rugby league competition

2005 Powergen Challenge Cup
- Duration: 9 Rounds
- Broadcast partners: BBC Sport
- Winners: Hull
- Runners-up: Leeds
- Lance Todd Trophy: Kevin Sinfield

The 2005 Powergen Rugby League Challenge Cup was played by teams from across Europe during the 2005 rugby league season. Hull F.C. won the cup defeating Leeds Rhinos in the final.

== Qualifying round ==
Date	Team One	Team Two	Score
15 Jan	Cas. Lock Lane	Ideal Isberg	30–0
15 Jan	Castleford Panthers	Ovenden	28–24
15 Jan	Cott. Phoenix	Barrow Is.	2–8
15 Jan	Crosfields	Illingworth	10–22
15 Jan	Cutsyke	Shaw Cross	16–14
15 Jan	East Leeds	Waterhead	22–29
15 Jan	Heworth	Loughborough University	6–21
15 Jan	Huddersfield Sharks	Stanningley	14–19
15 Jan	Hull Wyke	Embassy	30–36
15 Jan	Hunslet Warriors	Simms Cross	6–38
15 Jan	Ince Rose Bridge	Hensingham	17–18
15 Jan	Normanton	Seaton Rangers	17–16
15 Jan	Rochdale Mayfield	Featherstone Lions	21–16
15 Jan	Stanley	Eastmoor	15–14
15 Jan	W London Sharks	Fife	42–10
15 Jan	Widnes St Maries	Saddleworth	52–0
15 Jan	York Acorn	East Hull	12–64
16 Jan	Cardiff Demons	Walney	12–28

== First round ==
Date	Team One	Team Two	Score
05 Feb	Barrow Is.	Skirlaugh	16–12
05 Feb	Blackbrook	Oulton	6–9
05 Feb	Castleford Panthers	East Hull	10–20
05 Feb	Clayton	Leigh Miners R.	20–42
05 Feb	Essex	Elland	12–44
05 Feb	Gateshead S	Wath Brow Hornets	10–66
05 Feb	Haydock	Cutsyke	46–12
05 Feb	Hull Dockers	Bradford Dudley	46–16
05 Feb	Illingworth	Stanningley	20–18
05 Feb	Milford	Huddersfield UR	42–20
05 Feb	Oldham St Annes	Loughborough University	52–10
05 Feb	Queens	Millom	22–24
05 Feb	Navy	Normanton	16–18
05 Feb	St Albans	Thatto Heath	14–48
05 Feb	Simms Cross	Widnes St Maries	23–14
05 Feb	South London	W London Sharks	24–20
05 Feb	Stanningley	Walney	40–16
05 Feb	Warrington Wizards	Sharlston Rovers	16–22
05 Feb	Waterhead	Askam	36–24
05 Feb	West Bowling	Leigh East	12–10
05 Feb	West Hull	British Army	8–38
05 Feb	Westgate Redoubt	Eccles & Salford Jrs	6–26
05 Feb	Wigan St Judes	Embassy	68–0
05 Feb	Wigan St Pats	Hensingham	58–6
06 Feb	Buffaloes	Thornhill	31–10
06 Feb	RAF	Cas. Lock Lane	8–44
06 Feb	Siddal	Coventry Bears	26–4

== Second round ==
Date	Team One	Team Two	Score
19 Feb	Barrow Is.	Elland	10–14
19 Feb	Cas. Lock Lane	South London	50–24
19 Feb	Haydock	Normanton	48–30
19 Feb	Illingworth	Eccles & Salford Jrs	28–26
19 Feb	Milford	Wath Brow Hornets	14–34
19 Feb	Oldham St Annes	Leigh Miners R.	18–12
19 Feb	Rochdale Mayfield	Stanningley	14–19
19 Feb	Sharlston Rovers	Oulton	31–21
19 Feb	Siddal	Wigan St Pats	29–26
19 Feb	Simms Cross	Thornhill	16–24
19 Feb	Thatto Heath	East Hull	26–38
19 Feb	Waterhead	British Army	15–12
19 Feb	West Bowling	Hull Dockers	26–27
19 Feb	Wigan St Judes	Millom	22–16

== Third round ==
Date	Team One	Team Two	Score
11 Mar	Cas. Lock Lane	Halifax	0–76
11 Mar	Sharlston Rovers	Oldham	14–46
12 Mar	Wath Brow Hornets	Dewsbury	32–30
13 Mar	Barrow	East Hull	42–22
13 Mar	Batley	St Gaudens	40–14
13 Mar	Blackpool	Toulouse	18–58
13 Mar	Castleford Tigers	Hull Dockers	72–10
13 Mar	Doncaster	Stanningley	54–6
13 Mar	Elland	York City Knights	12–50
13 Mar	Featherstone Rovers	Thornhill	48–10
13 Mar	Gateshead	UTC	6–56
13 Mar	Haydock	Hunslet Hawks	4–46
13 Mar	Keighley	Strela Kazan	62–14
13 Mar	London Skolars	Pia	14–58
13 Mar	Oldham St Annes	Whitehaven	30–62
13 Mar	Rochdale Hornets	Illingworth	120–4
13 Mar	Siddal	Hull Kingston Rovers	6–50
13 Mar	Swinton	Locomotiv	70–10
13 Mar	Waterhead	Sheffield Eagles	16–22
13 Mar	Workington Town	Wigan St Judes	44–20

== Fourth round ==
- 2 April Leeds Rhinos 26 - Warrington Wolves 22
- 2 April Pia Donkeys 53 - Keighley Cougars 26
- 2 April Toulouse Olympique 60 - Wath Brow Hornets 12
- 3 April Barrow Raiders 33 - Sheffield Eagles 26
- 3 April Batley Bulldogs 8 - Leigh Centurions 25
- 3 April Doncaster Dragons 34 - Workington 18
- 3 April Bradford Bulls 80 - Featherstone Rovers 14
- 3 April Halifax R.L.F.C. 23 - Castleford Tigers 14
- 3 April St Helens 26 - Huddersfield Giants 22
- 3 April London Broncos 70 - Hunslet Hawks 4
- 3 April York City Knights 32 - Oldham 28
- 3 April Salford City Reds 30 - Rochdale Hornets 24
- 3 April Union Treiziste Catalane 32 - Hull Kingston Rovers 18
- 3 April Hull F. C. 36 - Wakefield Trinity Wildcats 12
- 3 April Widnes Vikings 32 - Swinton Lions 18
- 3 April Wigan Warriors 42 - Whitehaven Warriors 4

== Fifth round ==
- 6 May Leeds Rhinos 70 - Pia Donkeys 0
- 6 May St Helens 62 - York City Knights 0
- 6 May Wigan Warriors 16 - Union Treiziste Catalane 10
- 7 May Hull F.C. 26 - Bradford Bulls 24
- 7 May Toulouse Olympique 32 - Doncaster Dragons 18
- 8 May Widnes Vikings 50 - Barrow Raiders 8
- 8 May Leigh Centurions 40 - Halifax R.L.F.C. 20
- 8 May Salford City Reds 12 - London Broncos 26

== Quarter-finals ==
- 24 June Leeds Rhinos 32 - London Broncos 12
- 26 June St Helens 75 - Wigan Warriors 0
- 26 June Toulouse Olympique 40 - Widnes Vikings 24
- 25 June Hull F.C. 46 - Leigh Centurions 14.

== Semi-finals ==
- 30 July Hull F.C. 34 - St Helens 8
- 31 July Leeds Rhinos 56 - Toulouse Olympique 18

== Final ==
Katherine Jenkins performed at the match which was on 27 August at Millennium Stadium, Cardiff and attended by 74,213 spectators. Leeds came to the final 4/1 favourites to win and stamped their authority on the game in the early stages with a penalty try which was converted by Kevin Sinfield. Hull fought back with a try from Motu Tony converted by Danny Brough. Hull took the lead for the first time through Gareth Raynor's try in the corner after a superb pass by Nathan Blacklock. Brough converted brilliantly to make the score 12–6. Leeds fought back and a try from Danny Ward was converted by Sinfield to draw the scores level. A dreadful Marcus Bai error in his own in-goal area as he tried to keep the ball alive gifted Richard Whiting a try for Hull which was converted by Brough. Minutes later Brough added a drop goal to make the score 19–12 to Hull. A Mark Calderwood converted try set up a tense finish with the score at 19–18.

It seemed as though Leeds were going to walk away with the spoils as Marcus Bai rectified his earlier error by grabbing a late try which was converted by Sinfield and left the score 24–19. To immense noise from the Hull fans, Hull-born Paul Cooke broke through the Leeds defence and grounded the ball down underneath the posts to allow for a simple conversion. The youngster Danny Brough capped off an outstanding performance by converting the try under pressure to make the score 25–24 to Hull. In the dying seconds Richard Swain charged down a drop goal attempt to keep the scores as they were and Hull held on for arguably the best Challenge Cup final ever. Hull overturned all the odds, beating Bradford and cup holders St Helens along the way.

=== Scores ===
- 4–0 penalty try (Calderwood)
- 6–0 Sinfield con
- 6–4 Tony try
- 6–6 Brough con
- 6–10 Raynor try
- 6–12 Brough con
- 10–12 Ward try
- 12–12 Sinfield con
- 12–16 Whiting try
- 12–18 Brough con
- 12–19 Brough drop goal
- 16–19 Calderwood try
- 18–19 Sinfield con
- 22–19 Bai try
- 24–19 Sinfield con
- 24–23 Cooke try
- 24–25 Brough con

=== Rosters ===
==== Leeds ====
Coach: Tony Smith

- 1. Richie Mathers
- 2. Mark Calderwood
- 3. Chev Walker
- 4. Keith Senior
- 5. Marcus Bai
- 13. Kevin Sinfield (c)
- 7. Rob Burrow
- 8. Ryan Bailey
- 9. Matt Diskin
- 15. Danny Ward
- 11. Ali Lauiti'iti
- 12. Chris McKenna
- 20. Gareth Ellis

===== Subs =====
- 6. Danny McGuire
- 14. Andrew Dunemann
- 16. Willie Poching
- 18. Jamie Jones-Buchanan

==== Hull ====
Coach: John Kear

- 14. Motu Tony
- 2. Nathan Blacklock
- 3. Kirk Yeaman
- 30. Richard Whiting
- 5. Gareth Raynor
- 6. Richard Horne
- 21. Danny Brough
- 8. Ewan Dowes
- 9. Richard Swain (c)
- 20. Garreth Carvell
- 11. Shayne McMenemy
- 12. Stephen Kearney
- 13. Paul Cooke

===== Subs =====
- 10. Paul King
- 15. Jamie Thackray
- 16. Tommy Saxton
- 17. Chris Chester

=== Referee ===
- S Ganson (St Helens)

=== Man of the Match ===
Kevin Sinfield was the man of match winning the Lance Todd Trophy, but was the losing captain.
