= Eamon O'Carroll =

English rugby league coach & Ireland international player

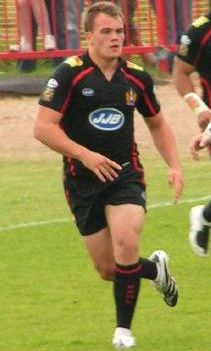

Personal information
- Full name: Eamon David O'Carroll
- Born: 13 June 1987 (age 39) Waterhead, Oldham, England
- Height: 5 ft 11 in (1.80 m)
- Weight: 15 st 8 lb (99 kg)

Playing information
- Position: Prop
Club
| Years | Team | Pld | T | G | FG | P |
|---|---|---|---|---|---|---|
| 2005–11 | Wigan Warriors | 65 | 3 | 0 | 0 | 12 |
| 2012 | Hull FC | 10 | 0 | 0 | 0 | 0 |
| 2012–17 | Widnes Vikings | 73 | 3 | 0 | 0 | 4 |
| | Total | 148 | 6 | 0 | 0 | 16 |
Representative
| Years | Team | Pld | T | G | FG | P |
| 2007–13 | Ireland | 6 | 0 | 0 | 0 | 0 |

Coaching information
Club
| Years | Team | Gms | W | D | L | W% |
| 2020–22 | Newcastle Thunder | 49 | 14 | 1 | 33 | 29 |
| 2024 | Bradford Bulls | 34 | 21 | 2 | 11 | 62 |
| 2026– | St Helens | 8 | 3 | 0 | 5 | 38 |
| | Total | 91 | 38 | 3 | 49 | 42 |
- Source: As of 20 November 2026

Eamon O'Carroll (born 13 June 1987 in Oldham) is a professional rugby league coach who is a interim head coach at St Helens in the Super League. He is also a former Ireland international rugby league footballer who last played for the Widnes Vikings. Eamon progressed through the Wigan Warriors Academy after signing in 2002 from Waterhead A.R.L.F.C. (in Waterhead, Greater Manchester) to eventually find himself playing prop during the 2005 and 2006 seasons.

== Playing career ==
=== Wigan Warriors ===
He was called up into the first-team squad for the first time before Wigan Warriors' Challenge Cup match with Wakefield Trinity Wildcats in April 2006. He was an immediate hit with the Wigan Warriors fans for his enthusiasm and work rate. He went on to make four more appearances that season.

After numerous impressive performances he went on to make 13 Super League appearances for Wigan Warriors in the 2007 season which was probably best remembered for the opening day of the season when Wigan Warriors played Warrington Wolves where Adrian Morley came off second best in a collision with Eamon.

In 2008, Eamon O'Carroll played as a prop in the Super League. Despite initial discussion regarding his physical size, O'Carroll made 21 appearances and scored two tries during the season. He subsequently signed a three-year contract.

He started the 2009 season as a substitute in a home defeat by Wakefield Trinity Wildcats. Despite being on the losing side, O'Carroll earned himself a starting spot for the next three weeks in favour of the out of form Andy Coley. He then made 2 more appearances for Wigan Warriors before he was ruled out for the season with a broken bone in his foot.

=== Hull FC ===
In September 2011, O'Carroll signed a 3-year contract with Hull F.C. for 2012.

=== Widnes Vikings ===
In June 2012, O'Carroll signed a contract with Widnes Vikings till end of 2014 season.

In April 2014, Eamon signed a new two-year deal to stay with Widnes Vikings.

=== International ===
He played international rugby for Ireland.

He was named in the Ireland training squad for the 2008 Rugby League World Cup. He made numerous impressive performances for Ireland in the 2008 Rugby League World Cup where he stood up well to some of the best players in the world.

== Coaching ==
=== Bradford Bulls ===
On 19 July 2023 he was announced as the new head-coach for the 2024 season on a three-year deal, with Lee Greenwood filling in as interim coach for the remainder of the 2023 season.

On 17 October 2024, O'Carroll announced his departure from the Bradford Bulls to take on a new role at a Super League club.

=== St Helens RFC ===
On 7 November 2024 it was reported that he had joined St Helens as assistant coach, following the recent departure of Matty Smith

On 23 July 2026 it was reported that he had taken the role of interim head-coach for St Helens in the Super League following the shock departure of Paul Rowley
