= Jack Briscoe =

English rugby league footballer

Personal information
- Full name: Jack Briscoe
- Born: 25 October 1991 (age 34) Pontefract, England
- Height: 183 cm (6 ft 0 in)
- Weight: 85 kg (13 st 5 lb)

Playing information
- Position: Wing
Club
| Years | Team | Pld | T | G | FG | P |
|---|---|---|---|---|---|---|
| 2012–13 | Hull F.C. | 1 | 0 | 0 | 0 | 0 |
| 2012(loan) | → Featherstone Rovers | 9 | 5 | 0 | 0 | 20 |
| 2013(loan) | → York City Knights | 15 | 6 | 0 | 0 | 24 |
| | Total | 25 | 11 | 0 | 0 | 44 |
- Relatives: Luke Briscoe (brother); Tom Briscoe (brother)

Jack Briscoe (born 25 October 1991) is an English rugby league footballer who last played for Hull F.C. in the Super League. He was dual registered with Championship club Featherstone Rovers for the 2012 season, and with York City Knights for the 2013 season.

In April 2013, Briscoe made an appearance for Hull FC in their 62-6 Challenge Cup win over North Wales Crusaders. In July, Briscoe sustained ankle injury in a York match against Barrow that ruled him out for the remainder of the season and he was subsequently released by Hull.
