= Laurence Pearce =

English rugby footballer

Personal information
- Born: Laurence Francis Pearce; 3 December 1990 (age 35) Grantham, England
- Height: 1.93 m (6 ft 4 in)
- Weight: 120 kg (18 st 13 lb; 265 lb)

Playing information
Club
| Years | Team | Pld | T | G | FG | P |
|---|---|---|---|---|---|---|
| 2011–2012 | Hull FC |

Rugby union career
- Position: Back row
- Current team: Agen
Senior career
| Years | Team | Apps | (Points) |
| 2012–14 | Rotherham Titans | 14 | (5) |
| 2014–15 | Leicester Tigers | 13 | (4) |
| 2014-15 | Doncaster Knights | 1 | (0) |
| 2015-16 | Leicester Tigers | 14 | (4) |
| 2016-17 | Sale Sharks | 15 | (2) |
| 2017-19 | Stade Montois | 36 | (5) |
| 2019- | Agen | 9 | (0) |

Laurence Pearce is an English professional rugby league and rugby union player. He has played club level rugby league (RL) in the Super League for Hull F.C. (2011–12), and as of 2017 he plays for Mont-de-Marsan, as a back row. Laurence Pearce joined Aviva Premiership club Leicester Tigers at the beginning of the 2014/15 season from RFU Championship club Rotherham Titans. In early March 2016 it was announced Pearce would join Sale Sharks from Leicester Tigers.

In his 2-year spell at Leicester Tigers Pearce made 28 appearances, scoring 8 tries.
