= Luke Briscoe =

English rugby league footballer

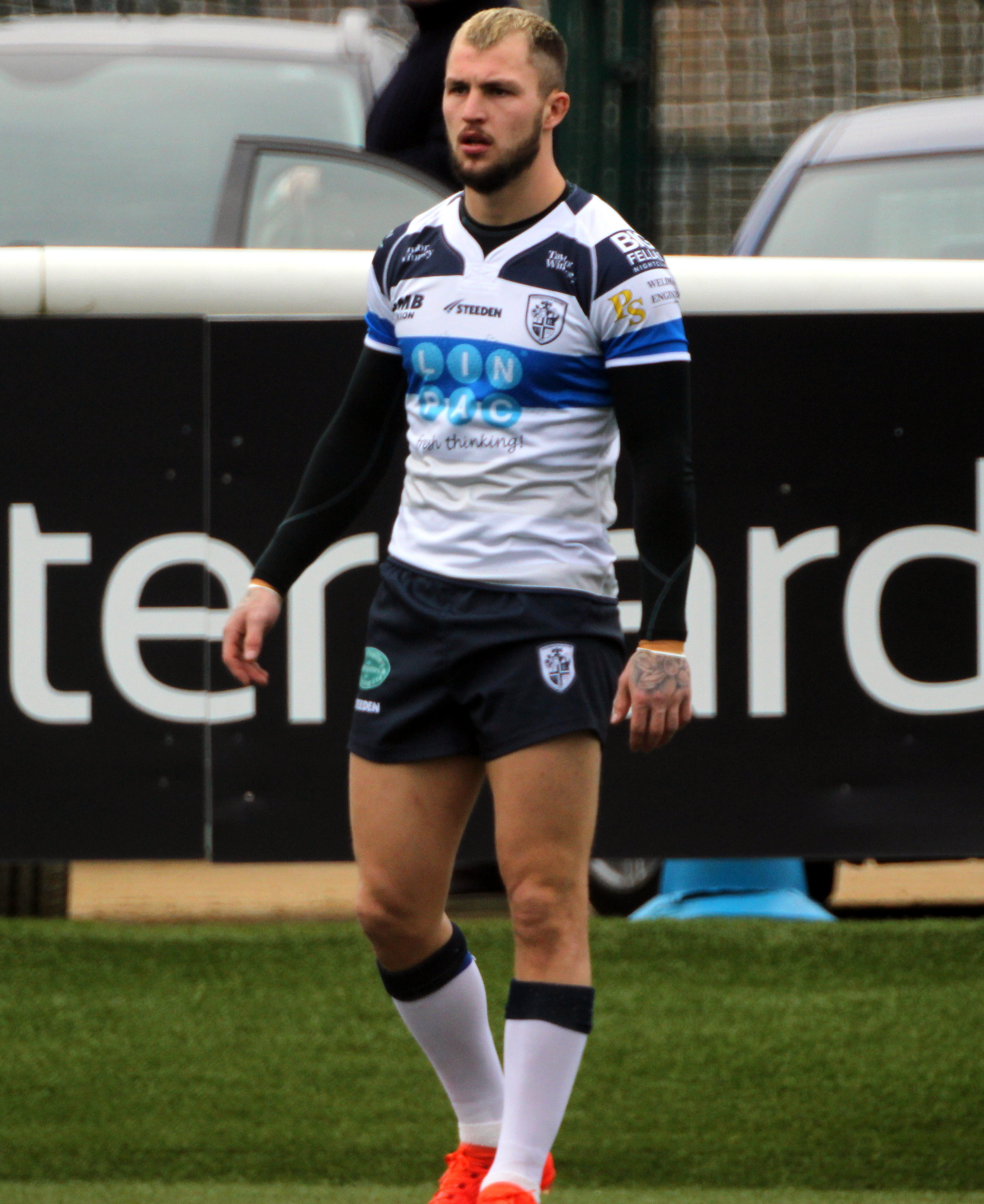

Personal information
- Full name: Luke Briscoe
- Born: 11 March 1994 (age 32) Featherstone, West Yorkshire, England
- Height: 6 ft 0 in (1.83 m)
- Weight: 14 st 13 lb (95 kg)

Playing information
- Position: Wing, Centre
Club
Years	Team	Pld	T	G	FG	P
2012–16	Leeds Rhinos	10	2	0	0	8
2014(loan)	→ Wakefield Trinity Wildcats	2	0	0	0	0
2014(loan)	→ Hunslet Hawks	7	1	0	0	4
2015(loan)	→ Hunslet Hawks	17	7	0	0	28
2016(loan)	→ Featherstone Rovers	10	5	0	0	20
2017–18	Featherstone Rovers	44	43	0	0	172
2018(loan)	→ Leeds Rhinos	10	5	0	0	20
2019–21	Leeds Rhinos	46	13	0	0	52
2019(DR)	→ Featherstone Rovers	17	10	0	0	40
2020(loan)	→ Featherstone Rovers	1	1	0	0	4
2022–23	Featherstone Rovers	54	35	0	0	140
2024–26	Doncaster	56	21	0	0	84
	Total	274	143	0	0	572
- Source: As of 07 November 2025
- Relatives: Tom Briscoe (brother); Jack Briscoe (brother)

Luke Briscoe (born 11 March 1994) is an English former rugby league footballer who last played as a winger or centre for Doncaster in the RFL Championship.

He started his career at the Leeds club, playing on loan at Wakefield Trinity in the Super League, Hunslet in Championship 1 and the Kingstone Press Championship, and Featherstone in the Kingstone Press Championship. He played for Featherstone Rovers in the Championship and joined Leeds on loan in the top flight. He then spent time away from Leeds on dual registration with Featherstone Rovers in the Betfred Championship.

== Background ==
Briscoe was born in Featherstone, West Yorkshire, England. He is the brother of England national rugby league team winger Tom Briscoe who also played for the Leeds Rhinos.

== Career ==
=== Leeds ===
He is signed for the 2012 season onwards, he signed a professional contract 22 September 2011.

He joined Leeds on 22 September 2012, after playing his youth career at Hull F.C.

He signed a four-year contract with the club. He made three appearances for Leeds and scored once on his début. He was released at the end of the 2015 season.

=== Wakefield Trinity ===
Briscoe spent the 2014 Super League season at Wakefield Trinity on a one-year loan deal. However, he only made two appearances and returned to Leeds.

=== Hunslet RLFC ===
Briscoe was sent on loan to Hunslet for the rest of the season and played 18 games, scoring 6 tries.

=== Leeds Rhinos ===
On 19 June 2018 it was reported that he had signed for Leeds in the Super League.

=== Featherstone Rovers (re-join) ===
On 27 October 2021 it was reported that he had signed for Featherstone Rovers in the RFL Championship in a permanent move On 28 May 2022, Briscoe played for Featherstone in their 2022 RFL 1895 Cup final loss against Leigh.

=== Doncaster RLFC ===
On 10 November 2023 it was reported that he had signed for Doncaster RLFC in the RFL Championship on a two-year deal.
