= Danny Nicklas =

English rugby league footballer

Personal information
- Full name: Daniel Nicklas
- Born: 29 June 1991 (age 34); Hull, England
- Height: 178 cm (5 ft 10 in)
- Weight: 80 kg (12 st 8 lb)

Playing information
- Position: Stand-off
Club
Years	Team	Pld	T	G	FG	P
2010–12	Hull F.C.	11	0	0	0	0
2012(loan)	→ York City Knights	2	0	0	0	0
2013	York City Knights	9	0	0	0	0
2013	Gateshead Thunder	5	0	0	0	0
2013(loan)	→ Gloucestershire All Golds	2	0	0	0	0
2014–15	Doncaster	15	1	0	0	4
2016	York City Knights	25	10	62	0	164
2017–18	Newcastle Thunder	16	6	0	0	24
2019	Hunslet	13	0	2	0	4
	Total	98	17	64	0	196
- Source: As of 15 October 2019

Danny Nicklas (born 29 June 1991) is an English rugby league footballer who last played for Hunslet in League 1, as a stand-off.

He used to play for Hull F.C. and the York City Knights, and he has also played in the Kingstone Press League 1 for the Gloucestershire All Golds.
