= Danny Tickle =

England international rugby league footballer

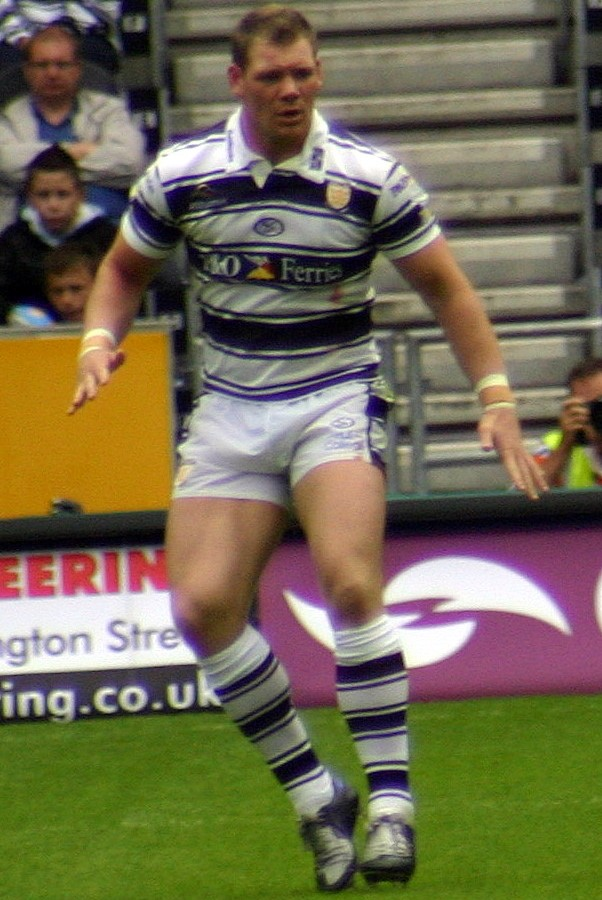

Personal information
- Born: 10 March 1983 (age 42); Golborne, Greater Manchester, England

Playing information
- Height: 6 ft 3 in (1.91 m)
- Weight: 16 st 1 lb (102 kg)
- Position: Second-row, Loose forward, Prop
Club
Years	Team	Pld	T	G	FG	P
2000–02	Halifax	45	10	100	2	242
2002–06	Wigan Warriors	141	34	217	2	572
2007–13	Hull F.C.	177	47	570	1	1329
2014–15	Widnes Vikings	45	3	117	0	246
2016	Castleford Tigers	11	0	1	0	2
2016–17	Leigh Centurions	38	4	0	0	16
2018	Hull Kingston Rovers	26	4	31	0	78
2019	Workington Town	24	4	0	0	16
	Total	507	106	1036	5	2501
Representative
Years	Team	Pld	T	G	FG	P
2003	Lancashire	1	0	0	0	0
2003	England Knights	3	2	23	0	54
2009	England	1	0	0	0	0

Danny Tickle (born 10 March 1983) is an English former professional rugby league footballer who plays in the second-row for Workington Town in League 1, Tickle is also a noted goal-kicker.

During his career Tickle played for several clubs, including Halifax, Wigan Warriors, Hull F.C., Widnes Vikings, Castleford Tigers, Leigh Centurions and Hull Kingston Rovers.

== Background ==
Tickle was born in Golborne, Greater Manchester, England. He learned rugby league at local amateur club, Golborne Parkside.

== Senior career ==
=== Halifax (2000-02) ===
At the start of his career he played for three seasons at Halifax in the Super League.

=== Wigan Warriors (2002-06) ===
In June 2002, Tickle signed for the Wigan Warriors for a fee of £100,000, despite interest from other Super League sides that included St Helens. Tickle played for the Wigan Warriors at second-row, scoring a try in the 2003 Super League Grand Final, which ended in a 25–12 victory to the Bradford Bulls. He performed well enough to earn a new two-year contract in July 2004. The following season, Tickle was outstanding in an injury-hit Wigan squad. He went onto pick-up the Wigan Supporters' 'Player of the Year Award'. He was released at the end of the 2006 season.

=== Hull (2007-13) ===
During his time at Hull F.C., Tickle enjoyed an incredible début season with the West Hull outfit in 2007, picking-up the Players,' Supporters' and Coaches' 'Player of the Year Awards. Whilst also finishing as the club's top points scorer in both the 2007 and 2008 Super League seasons. Tickle played for Hull F.C. in the 2008 Challenge Cup Final, in a 28–16 defeat by St. Helens. Tickle also represented the club in the 2013 Challenge Cup Final.

=== Widnes Vikings (2014-15) ===
Tickle was linked with a move to the Widnes Vikings for the 2013 Super League season, but the move never came to fruition. Until 12-months later however, Tickle joined the Widnes club for the 2014 season onwards. In November 2015, Tickle was assaulted outside a nightclub in Ashton-in-Makerfield. Tickle suffered a fractured skull as a result of the incident, and it was initially believed that the injury would bring his playing career to an end. He was released by Widnes in March 2016.

=== Castleford Tigers (2016) ===
After his release from the Widnes outfit, he was signed in April 2016 by the Castleford Tigers on a short-term contract, before being released three months later so he could sign for the Leigh Centurions.

=== Leigh Centurions (2016-17) ===
Tickle represented Leigh for two seasons, helping the club win promotion to the Super League in 2016. Tickle unfortunately suffered relegation from the Super League with Leigh in the 2017 season, due to losing the Million Pound Game against the Catalans Dragons.

=== Hull Kingston Rovers (2018) ===
In 2018, it was revealed that Tickle had signed a one-year contract to play for Hull Kingston Rovers in the Super League. Tickle scored a try on his Hull Kingston Rovers début against the Catalans Dragons. The game took-place on 15 February 2018, Hull Kingston Rovers won the game 23–4 at Craven Park.

=== Workington Town (2019) ===
On 11 December 2018, it was announced that Tickle had signed a one-year deal with League 1 outfit Workington Town, to play for the club on a part-time basis.

Tickle made his début for Workington Town on 17 February 2019, in a 28–32 victory over Oldham.

A week later on 24 February 2019, Tickle scored his first try for Workington Town in a 48–18 victory over the Crusaders.

=== Representative career ===
Tickle represented England A in the 2003 European Nations Cup, recording three appearances, scoring two tries and kicking 23 goals, posting 54 points in total.

He also earned one cap for the senior England team, appearing against Wales in 2009.

== Honours ==
=== Club (Wigan Warriors 2002-06) ===
- 2005: 'Supporters' Player of the Year Award'

=== Club (Hull F.C. 2007-13) ===
- 2007: 'Players' Player of the Year Award'
- 2007: 'Supporters' Player of the Year Award'
- 2007: 'Coaches' Player of the Year Award'
