= Brett Seymour =

Australian rugby league footballer

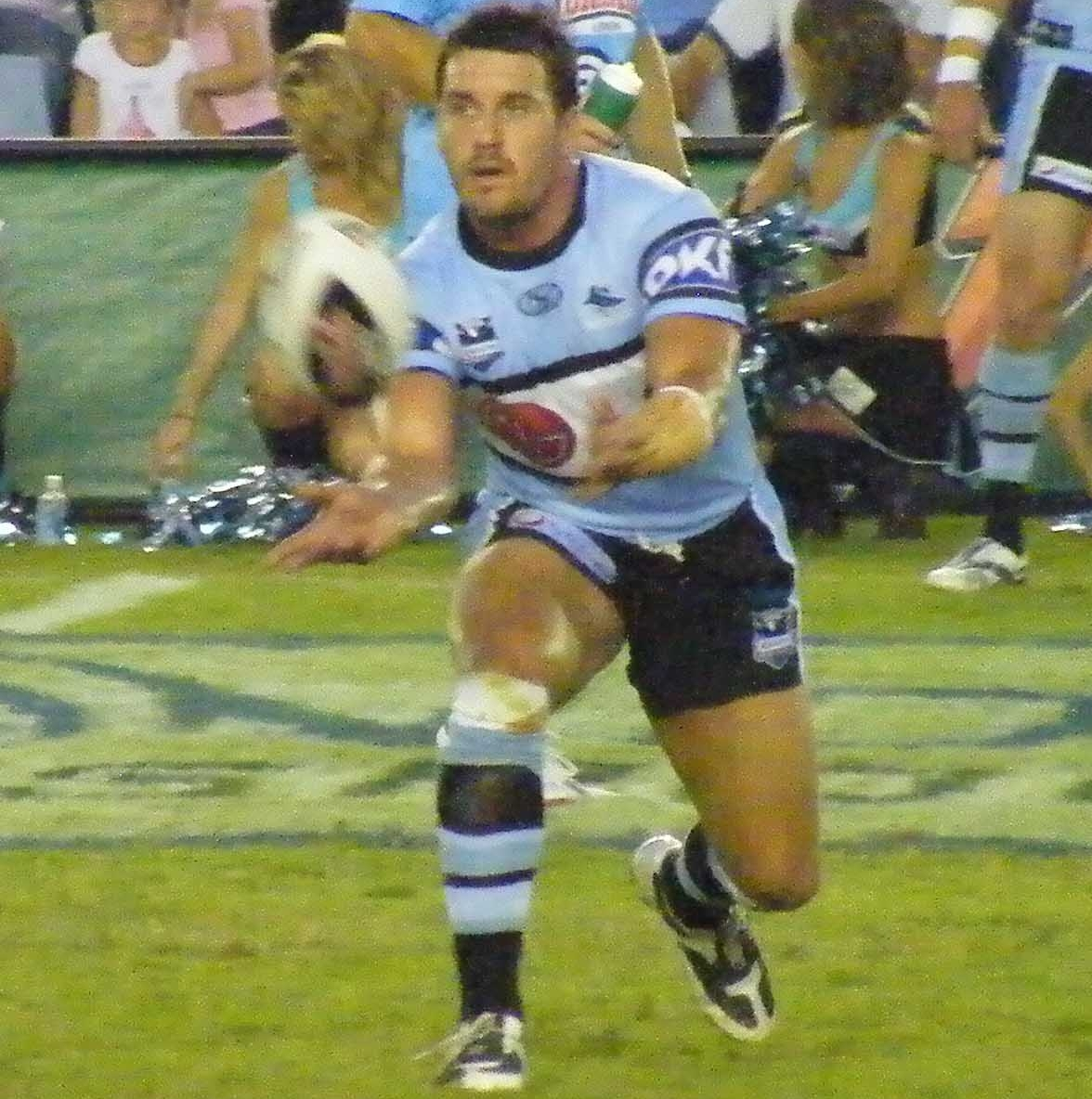

Personal information
- Born: 27 September 1984 (age 42) Mackay, Queensland, Australia

Playing information
- Height: 178 cm (5 ft 10 in)
- Weight: 90 kg (14 st 2 lb)
- Position: Halfback, Five-eighth
Club
Years	Team	Pld	T	G	FG	P
2002–06	Brisbane Broncos	62	12	32	2	114
2007–09	Cronulla Sharks	39	6	11	1	47
2010–11	New Zealand Warriors	22	2	9	0	26
2012–13	Hull F.C.	28	7	1	0	30
2014	Castleford Tigers	0	0	0	0	0
2014–15	Whitehaven	27	0	19	1	39
2015	Dewsbury Rams	13	1	43	0	90
	Total	191	28	115	4	346

Coaching information
Club
Years	Team	Gms	W	D	L	W%
2015	Whitehaven

Brett Seymour (born 27 September 1984) is an Australian former professional rugby league footballer. He last played professionally for the Dewsbury Rams and previously played in the National Rugby League for the Brisbane Broncos, Cronulla-Sutherland Sharks and New Zealand Warriors before moving to England where he joined Super League club, Hull FC. Seymour was the captain coach of Toowoomba Valleys in the Toowoomba Rugby League competition.

== Background ==
Seymour was born in Mackay, Queensland, Australia on 27 September 1984.

== Early career ==
On contract with the Brisbane Broncos from a young age, Seymour was a standout school boy performer, leading the St Patrick's Mackay schoolboy side to victory in the Confraternity Cup. Other schoolboys from the same age group included Grant Rovelli and former Manly centre, Ashley Alberts.

== Brisbane Broncos ==
Seymour made his NRL début in 2002 and was the youngest player to debut in the NRL for the Brisbane Broncos against St. George Illawarra Dragons on 26 May 2002. He went on to make 62 appearances for the club. In 2006, accusations were made by a female against Brett Seymour over an alleged incident at Brisbane's Regatta Hotel. No criminal charges were laid after a police investigation failed to find sufficient evidence.

After a mixture of promising football and injury woes as the Brisbane Broncos' new halfback, Seymour departed the club in 2007 over disciplinary issues.

== Cronulla-Sutherland Sharks ==
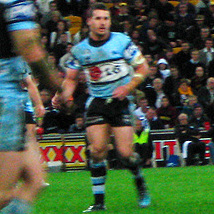
Seymour playing for the Sharks in 2008

Seymour joined the Cronulla-Sutherland Sharks on a 2-year contract, from 2007. Seymour had a number of stand-out games including one against the Eels when he kicked a 35-metre field goal in the fifth minute of golden point extra time to steer his side to a thrilling 25–24 victory.

When he was coming to the end of his first Cronulla contract Seymour was linked with a move to London-based Super League franchise Harlequins, however he signed a further two-year deal to stay at the Sharks. Seymour's 2008 season ended unfortunately when he injured his knee in week two of the finals in a team game of soccer where he collided with fellow Shark, Danny Nutley.

In March 2009 the Cronulla-Sutherland Sharks announced that Seymour had been stood down following an alcohol-fuelled incident at a local bar.

Seymour returned to the Sharks line-up but on 1 July 2009 it was announced that he had been sacked from Cronulla for repeated alcohol-related incidents. He had played in thirty nine games for the club before his sacking.

== New Zealand Warriors ==
On 3 August 2009 it was announced that Seymour had signed with the New Zealand Warriors for the 2010 season, with an option for 2011. The contract contained strict contractual provisions around Seymour's off-field behaviour and the NRL informed the Warriors that they will be heavily sanctioned should Seymour misbehave. Seymour moved to Auckland before the end of 2009 to begin preparations for the 2010 season and made his début for the club on 14 March 2010.

== Move to England ==
In 2011 he signed a three-year deal with Hull FC, beginning in 2012. Seymour was caught drink driving in November before leaving New Zealand.

On 11 September 2013 he signed a one-year deal for the Castleford Tigers, but was released in March 2014 without making a first-team appearance for the club.

He temporarily took over the head-coach role when at Whitehaven RLFC following Steve Deakin's unexpected departure, and then was assistant coach when James Coyle was appointed.

== Controversy ==
In 2019, Seymour's ex-wife revealed that he was violent towards her throughout their relationship and would often return home heavily intoxicated. She went on to say "He was extremely blind drunk and come into the house and just punched me straight to the ground, a big punch straight to the ground and I just fell to the ground, and the attack didn't stop there it was just bang bang bang, He was ripping chunks of my hair out of my head, I can still recall the carpet, he was rubbing my head into the carpet and my scalp had carpet burn".

In 2023, Seymour faced court charged with four counts of assault occasioning bodily harm (aggravated offences) and the court was advised Queensland Police were seeking to have all charges indicted, based on Seymour's previous criminal history including multiple convictions for assault and domestic violence offences. These charges were scheduled for a summary mention in Jan 2024. Seymour was sentenced in August 2025. The judge required him to pay his complainant $5000 and also jailed him for three years but immediately released him on parole.
