= Martin Aspinwall =

English rugby league footballer

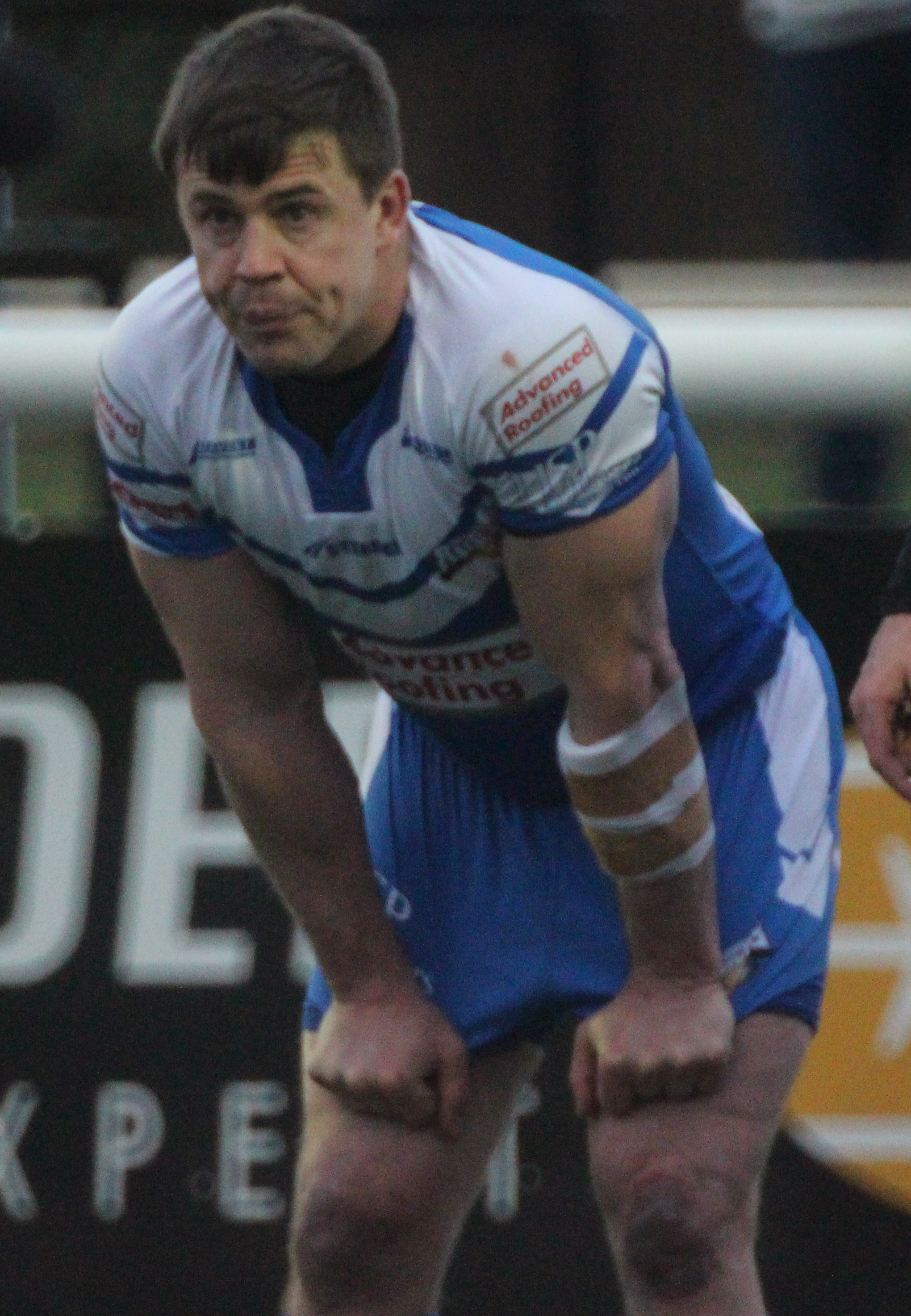

Personal information
- Born: 21 October 1981 (age 44) Wigan, Greater Manchester, England

Playing information
- Height: 6 ft 1 in (185 cm)
- Weight: 15 st 2 lb (96 kg)
- Position: Wing, Centre, Loose forward
Club
Years	Team	Pld	T	G	FG	P
2001–05	Wigan Warriors	113	33	0	0	132
2006–10	Huddersfield Giants	82	22	0	0	88
2011	Castleford Tigers	19	2	0	0	8
2012	Hull F.C.	27	0	0	0	0
2013–15	Leigh Centurions	36	3	0	0	12
2016–21	Barrow Raiders	50	4	0	0	16
	Total	327	64	0	0	256
Representative
Years	Team	Pld	T	G	FG	P
2003	England A	3	2	0	0	8
2003	Lancashire	1	0	0	0	0

Martin Aspinwall (born 21 October 1981) is an English former rugby league footballer. He played as a winger and centre for most of his career, playing in the Super League for the Wigan Warriors and the Huddersfield Giants. He later switched to loose forward, and went on to play for the Castleford Tigers and Hull F.C in the Super League, Leigh Centurions in the Championship and the Barrow Raiders in League 1.

== Career ==
Born in Wigan, Aspinwall started his career with hometown club Wigan as a top junior and was the first player to be signed onto their now pioneering scholarship scheme that was set up by Brian Foley and Dean Bell. On 8 July 2001, he made his début against Huddersfield at 19 years old and made six further substitute appearances in the same season. The 2002 Super League season proved to be a break-through year for him, as several injuries in the backs left the way open for him to establish himself in the first team. He played in at centre and wing during Wigan's league run-in and during the playoff series. Before the St. Helens Final Elimination clash, Aspinwall commented, "My goal at the beginning of the season was to get eight to ten games, maybe come off the bench, but because of the injury crisis that we've had, especially in the backs, I've found myself in the Semis now and one game away from a Grand Final.”

Coach Stuart Raper played Aspinwall alongside several other up and coming youngsters during the 2002's Super League VII. "It's quite exciting for me to be able to play these guys," said Raper. "The Aspinwalls and Briscoes are chomping [sic] at the bit to get on that paddock. Aspinwall continued his good form for the club and, in July 2003, signed a new two-year contract with the club, turning down strong interest from Warrington.

Aspinwall was selected for the England A squad to face New Zealand at Brentford in November 2002 but had to withdraw due to a viral illness. In 2003, he played and scored a try for England A in a 22–26 defeat against Australia, and made a further two appearances against Wales and France in the 2003 European Nations Cup. He was also picked to represent Lancashire in the 2003 Origin match.

Aspinwall became a first team regular in the next two years, and played for Wigan at centre in the 2003 Super League Grand Final which was lost to Bradford Bulls.

At the end of his contract, which ran out in October 2005, Wigan allowed Martin to become a free-agent. He had made 107 competitive appearances for Wigan, scoring 24 tries. He quickly signed for Super League rivals Huddersfield, where he played in the 2006 Challenge Cup Final defeat by St. Helens at Twickenham. He was also Giants top try scorer in his first season with 15.

In October 2006, Aspinwall was named in the 25-man Great Britain Tri-Nations squad to tour Australia and New Zealand. His 2007 season was cut short in July when he suffered an horrific cruciate knee injury against Warrington, ruling him potentially 12 months on the sidelines.

However he made a very speedy recovery and was named in the England training squad for the 2008 Rugby League World Cup.

Aspinwall was not offered an extension to his contract beyond the end of 2010, and linked up with Super League side Castleford. In June 2011, Aspinwall was jailed for four months for dangerous driving. After serving his sentence, he moved to Hull F.C. for the 2012 season, and played 27 games for the club before signing a one-year contract with Leigh at the end of the season. Aspinwall played till the end of the 2014–2015 season with Leigh before being released.

For the start of the 2016 season Aspinwall signed for Barrow Raiders one a one-year deal with the option of a second.
