= Liam Kent =

English rugby league footballer (born 1991)

Personal information
- Full name: Liam Kent
- Born: 9 April 1991 (age 35) Kingston upon Hull, England
- Height: 185 cm (6 ft 1 in)
- Weight: 95 kg (14 st 13 lb)

Playing information
- Position: Second-row
Club
Years	Team	Pld	T	G	FG	P
2011–14	Hull F.C.	7	0	0	0	0
2014–	Featherstone Rovers
	Total	7	0	0	0	0
- Source: (archived by web.archive.org) Hull FC profile As of 28 March 2013

Liam Kent (born 9 April 1991) is a rugby league footballer for Featherstone Rovers. He previously played for Hull F.C. in the Super League.
