= Richard Horne =

English RL coach and former GB & Scotland international rugby league footballer

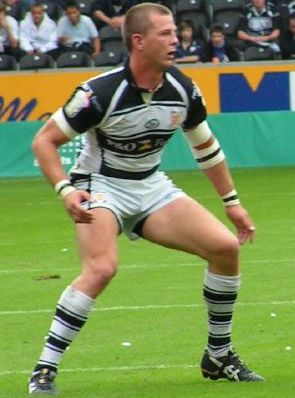

Personal information
- Full name: Richard Jay Horne
- Born: 16 July 1982 (age 44) Kingston upon Hull, Humberside, England
- Height: 5 ft 11 in (1.80 m)
- Weight: 13 st 3 lb (84 kg)

Playing information
- Position: Scrum-half, Stand-off, Fullback, Centre
Club
Years	Team	Pld	T	G	FG	P
1998–14	Hull FC	386	133	12	7	563
Representative
Years	Team	Pld	T	G	FG	P
2000	Scotland	3	0	0	0	0
2002–03	Yorkshire	2	0	0	0	0
2003–06	Great Britain	12	1	0	0	4

Coaching information
Club
Years	Team	Gms	W	D	L	W%
2017–	Doncaster	228	141	4	83	62
- Source: As of 3 November 2026
- Father: Eric Horne
- Relatives: Graeme Horne (brother); Robert Horne (brother)

Richard Horne (born 16 July 1982) is a professional rugby league coach who is the head coach of Doncaster in RFL Championship, and a former professional rugby league footballer who played in the 1990s, 2000s and 2010s. He played at international level for Great Britain and Scotland, representative level for Yorkshire, and at club level in the Super League for Hull FC, primarily as a fullback, wing, centre, stand-off or scrum-half.

== Background ==
Horne was born in Kingston upon Hull, Humberside. He is the older brother of the rugby league footballer; Graeme Horne.

== Career ==
Horne made his début for Hull at the age of 16, and spent his entire career with the club. He has also played for Great Britain, and Scotland.

Horne played at stand-off half for Hull in the 2005 Challenge Cup Final victory against the Leeds Rhinos.

He set a Super League record of tries scored in succession by scoring tries in 13 consecutive games during 2006's Super League XI. Hull reached the 2006 Super League Grand final to be contested against St. Helens, and Horne played at scrum half back in his side's 4–26 loss.

On 27 October 2008, it was announced that Horne had signed a new three-year deal with Hull.

On 17 January 2010, Horne played his testimonial match against neighbours, Hull Kingston Rovers and Hull F.C. won, 28–16 in front of a crowd of over 16,000 supporters, and former Hull player Steve Prescott paid tribute to Horne.

Horne announced his retirement at the end of the 2014 season to become assistant coach to Lee Radford alongside Chris Tuson & Andy Last.

In June 2017 Horne was announced as the new head coach of Doncaster R.L.F.C. taking over from Gary Thornton who left the club in May.
