= Kirk Yeaman =

Former GB & England international rugby league footballer

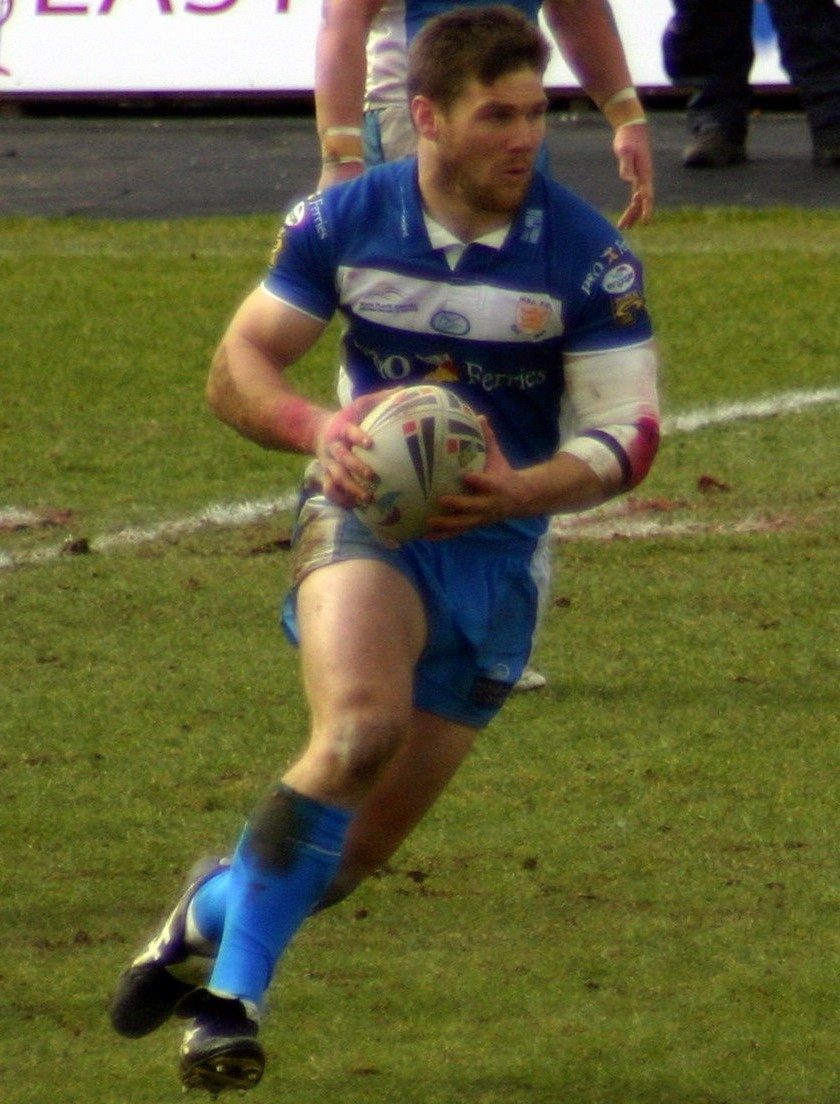

Personal information
- Full name: Kirk Yeaman
- Born: 15 September 1983 (age 42) Kingston upon Hull, Humberside, England

Playing information
- Height: 6 ft 0 in (1.83 m)
- Weight: 14 st 9 lb (93 kg)
- Position: Centre
Club
Years	Team	Pld	T	G	FG	P
2001–16	Hull FC	373	176	0	0	704
2016(DR)	→Doncaster RLFC	2	1	0	0	4
2018	Hull FC	1	0	0	0	0
	Total	376	177	0	0	708
Representative
Years	Team	Pld	T	G	FG	P
2004–11	England	8	3	0	0	12
2006–07	Great Britain	3	0	0	0	0

Kirk Yeaman (born 15 September 1983) is a former English professional rugby league footballer who played as a centre. An England and Great Britain international, he played his entire club career for Hull FC in the Super League, but also made two appearances for Doncaster as a dual-registration player.

He made 373 appearances for Hull FC between 2001 and 2016 before retiring after a 15-year career with the club, but briefly came out of retirement in May 2018 to register himself as a player due to the number of injury problems the club had.

== Early life ==
Yeaman was born at Hedon Road Maternity Hospital in Hull on 15 September 1983. He is the son of Debbie, who worked for Hull-based Smith & Nephew, and Dale Yeaman, a laminator. He has an older brother, Scott, who played rugby league for Hull Kingston Rovers and York Wasps, and a younger sister, Jessica. He attended Bransholme High School, and played junior rugby league for Myton Warriors.

== Career ==
Yeaman came up through the ranks at Hull, a centre who was likened to Jamie Lyon and also a proven try scorer. He made his debut in August 2001 against London Broncos. He scored 17 tries at the end of the 2005 season and an impressive tally in 2006 that took him over the 20 try mark.

Hull F.C. reached the 2006 Super League Grand final to be contested against St. Helens, and Yeaman played at centre in his side's 4-26 loss. His performances in 2006 saw him included in the Super League Dream Team.

Despite some injuries, he was called up to the Tri Nations in Australia, playing in two matches.

Yeaman signed a three-year contract extension with Hull, and he remained with the club until the end of the 2010 season.

He was forced to rule himself out contention for the England training squad for the 2008 Rugby League World Cup through injury.

Yeaman has a 2005 Challenge Cup winners medal after Hull beat Leeds 25-24 in the first ever August Challenge Cup Final, he was also a member of the Hull squad that reached the 2006 Super League Grand Final (losing to St. Helens) and was a double try scorer In Hull's 28-16 defeat also against St. Helens in the 2008 Challenge Cup Final at Wembley Stadium.

In 2011, Yeaman was rewarded for his form with Hull F.C. by being called up to the England Squad along with wing partner Tom Briscoe for the Four Nations. He was also included in the Super League Dream Team, again along with Briscoe.

At the start of the 2016 season, Yeaman made two appearances for Doncaster as a dual-registration player.

On 3 June 2016, a try against Widnes took Yeaman over the 700 point mark for Hull, consisting of 177 tries. Yeaman is only the second player in Hull's history to score 700 points without kicking a single goal. The late Clive Sullivan MBE is the other.

He played in the 2016 Challenge Cup Final victory over the Warrington Wolves at Wembley Stadium.

Yeaman announced his retirement as a player at the end of the 2016 season. He is third on Hull's all-time try scoring list with 177; only Clive Sullivan and Ivor Watts are ahead of him.

After retiring as a player, Yeaman joined the coaching staff at Hull. In 2018, Yeaman came out of retirement to play against local rivals Hull KR in a 34–22 win at the Magic Weekend. He left his coaching role in 2021 to start a career with the Prison Service.

In 2023, he was inducted into Hull FC's Hall of Fame.

== Honours ==
Club

- Challenge Cup: 2005, 2016

Individual

- Super League Dream Team: 2006, 2011
