= Ewan Dowes =

England international rugby league footballer

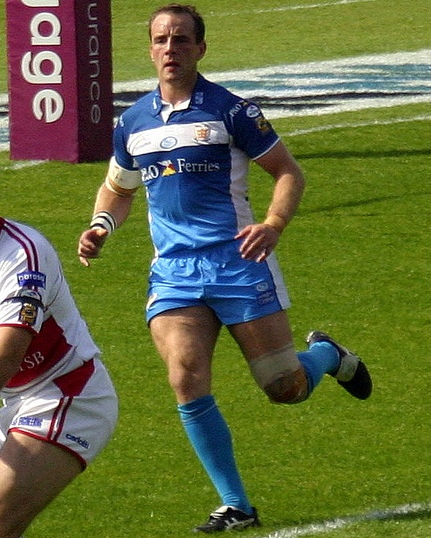

Personal information
- Full name: Robert Ewan Dowes
- Born: 4 March 1981 (age 45) Carlisle, Cumbria, England

Playing information
- Height: 188 cm (6 ft 2 in)
- Weight: 108 kg (17 st 0 lb)

Rugby league
- Position: Prop
Club
Years	Team	Pld	T	G	FG	P
2001–03	Leeds Rhinos	11	0	0	0	0
2003–11	Hull FC	240	10	0	0	40
2013	Workington Town	29	0	0	0	0
2014	Dewsbury Rams	19	2	0	0	8
	Total	299	12	0	0	48
Representative
Years	Team	Pld	T	G	FG	P
2003	Cumbria	1	1	0	0	4
2004–06	England	7	0	0	0	0

Rugby union
Club
Years	Team	Pld	T	G	FG	P
2001	Leeds Tykes

Ewan Dowes (born 4 March 1981) is an English former professional rugby league footballer who played for the Leeds Rhinos and Hull FC in the Super League. Dowes' usual position was prop. He was a member of the Hull team that won the 2005 Challenge Cup. Dowes was sport's first owner of a dual rugby code contract.

== Career ==
=== Rugby union ===
Born in Carlisle, Dowes attended Sedbergh School near Kendal, where he played on both the 1st XV and 1st XI. In his final year at Sedbergh he trained and played alongside future rugby union international James Simpson-Daniel. A review of his performance in the school magazine states: "Ewan Dowes was well to the fore in all departments, carrying the ball powerfully, scrummaging purposefully." In 2000, he was selected by England for the rugby union Junior World Championships.

=== Rugby league ===
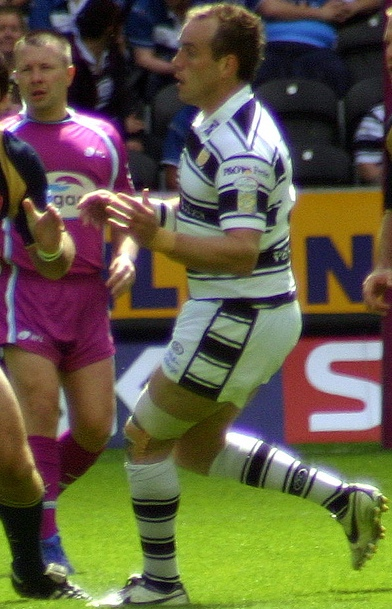
Ewan Dowes in action for Hull

Dowes became the first known player to sign a dual rugby code contract, playing rugby union for Leeds Tykes and rugby league for Leeds Rhinos. Dowes later decided to focus solely on his rugby league career, but with only limited first team opportunities at the Rhinos, he joined Hull on loan in May 2003, before making the move permanent a month later.

Dowes played for Hull at prop in their 2005 Challenge Cup victory against the Leeds Rhinos, signing a new contract at the end of the season. Hull also reached the 2006 Super League Grand final to be contested against St. Helens, and Dowes played as a prop in his side's 4-26 loss. In October 2010, he signed a new one-year contract with the club. He was released after his contract expired at the end of the 2011 Super League season.

After spending a year in Australia, Dowes returned to England and joined Workington Town. In 2014, he joined Dewsbury Rams.

He played at international level for England, making seven appearances between 2004 and 2006.

After retiring from rugby, Dowes worked as a financial adviser.
