= Tom Briscoe =

England international rugby league footballer

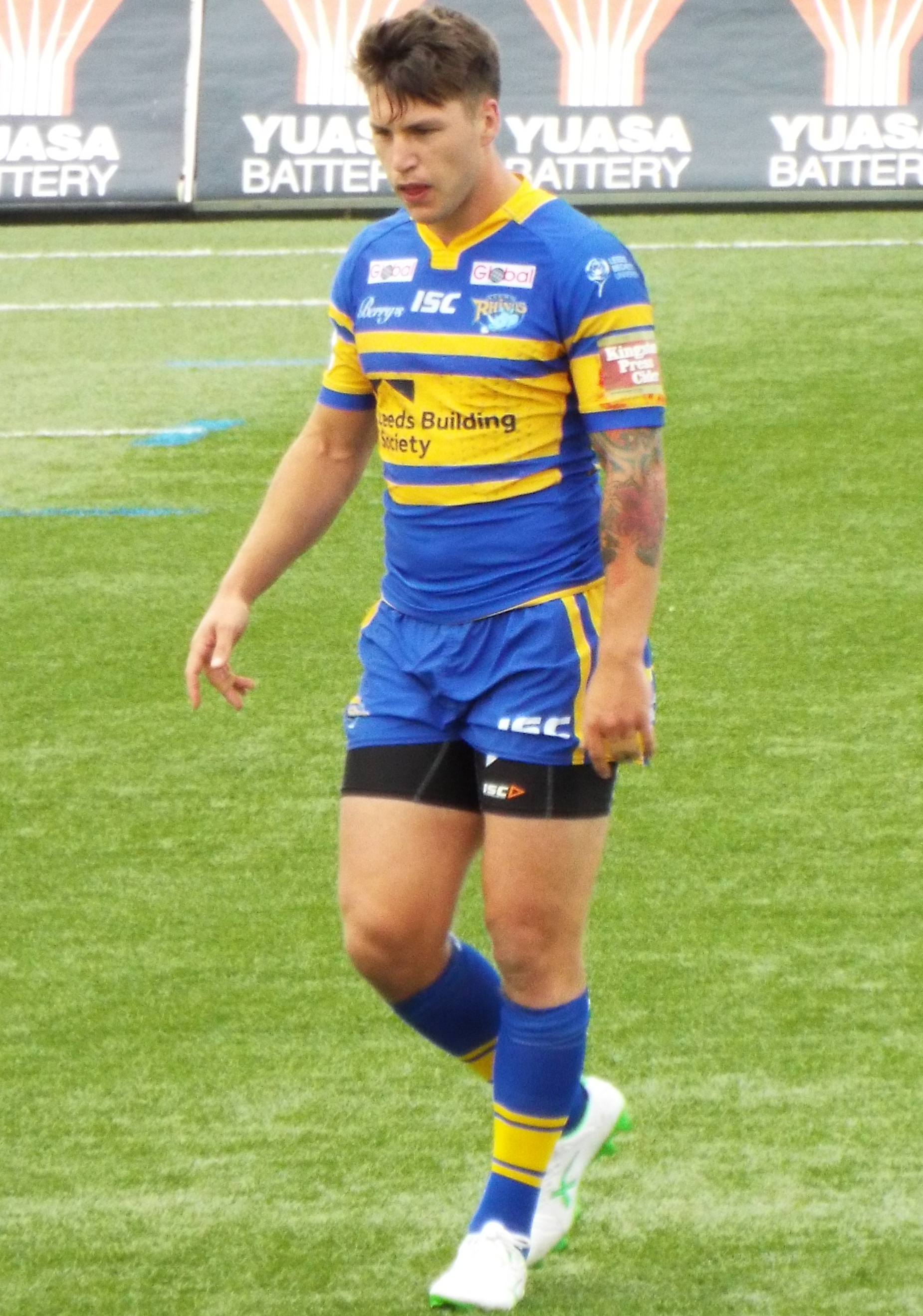

Personal information
- Full name: Thomas Richard Briscoe
- Born: 19 March 1990 (age 36) Featherstone, West Yorkshire, England
- Height: 6 ft 0 in (1.83 m)
- Weight: 15 st 10 lb (100 kg)

Playing information
- Position: Wing, Centre
Club
| Years | Team | Pld | T | G | FG | P |
|---|---|---|---|---|---|---|
| 2008–13 | Hull FC | 147 | 90 | 0 | 0 | 360 |
| 2014–22 | Leeds Rhinos | 208 | 93 | 0 | 0 | 372 |
| 2023–24 | Leigh Leopards | 34 | 20 | 0 | 0 | 80 |
| 2024–26 | Hull FC | 65 | 17 | 0 | 0 | 68 |
| | Total | 454 | 220 | 0 | 0 | 880 |
Representative
| Years | Team | Pld | T | G | FG | P |
| 2009–13 | England | 15 | 11 | 0 | 0 | 44 |
- Source: As of 12 September 2026
- Relatives: Luke Briscoe (brother); Jack Briscoe (brother)

Tom Briscoe (born 19 March 1990) is an English former professional rugby league footballer who played as a winger for Hull F.C. in the Super League and has played for England at international level.

He previously played for Leeds Rhinos and Leigh Leopards in the Super League and in his second spell for Hull FC.

Briscoe holds the record for most tries in a Challenge Cup final with five.

== Background ==
Briscoe was born in Featherstone, West Yorkshire, England.

== Club career ==
=== Hull F.C. ===
Briscoe signed for Hull F.C. from Amateur team Featherstone Lions, and made his Super League début in the opening game of the 2008 season for Hull against Warrington at the Halliwell Jones Stadium.

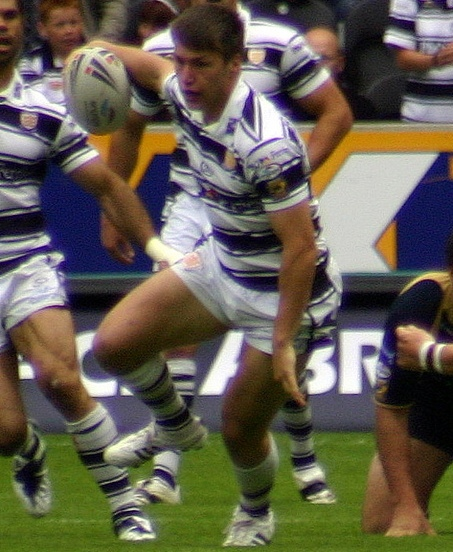
Briscoe playing for Hull F.C.

Following his impressive start to the 2009 season, Briscoe signed a new five-year contract which kept him at the KC Stadium until the end of the 2013 season.

In 2010 Tom was joined in the Hull F.C. squad by younger brother Jack, who graduated from the academy.

=== Leeds Rhinos ===
On 2 October 2013, Briscoe signed for Leeds, joining up with his younger brother Luke. On 16 February 2014, Briscoe made his début for the Leeds Rhinos, scoring at hat-trick of tries against Hull Kingston Rovers at the KC Lightstream Stadium in a 34–6 win and scored 8 tries in his first 10 appearances in a very successful start to his Leeds Rhinos career. Briscoe played in the 2014 Challenge Cup Final victory over the Castleford Tigers at Wembley Stadium. In the 2015 Challenge Cup Final on 29 August 2015, Briscoe scored five tries, the first player to achieve this at Wembley Stadium, as Leeds defeated Hull Kingston Rovers 50–0. Briscoe was named Lance Todd Trophy winner for his performance in this match.

Briscoe played in the 2015 Super League Grand Final victory over the Wigan Warriors at Old Trafford. Briscoe played in the 2017 Super League Grand Final victory over the Castleford Tigers at Old Trafford. Briscoe played for Leeds in the 2020 Challenge Cup Final and scored a try in a 17–16 victory over Salford at Wembley Stadium. Briscoe played a total of 26 games for Leeds in the 2021 Super League season including the club's 36–8 loss against St Helens in the semi-final. On 24 September 2022, Briscoe played for Leeds in their 24–12 loss to St Helens RFC in the 2022 Super League Grand Final.

=== Leigh ===
On 20 October 2022, Briscoe signed a contract to join the newly promoted Leigh side. On 12 August 2023, Briscoe played for Leigh in their 17-16 Challenge Cup final victory over Hull Kingston Rovers. It was Leigh's first major trophy for 52 years. Briscoe played 28 games for Leigh in the 2023 Super League season and scored 14 tries as the club finished fifth on the table and qualified for the playoffs. Briscoe played in their elimination playoff loss against Hull Kington Rovers.

=== Hull FC (rejoin) ===
On 23 April 2024 Hull F.C. confirmed the signing of Briscoe from Leigh, in a swap deal with Darnell McIntosh. On 28 August 2026, it was announced that Briscoe would be retiring from rugby league at the end of the 2026 Super League season.

He played his final game in the 12-18 win over Leeds Rhinos on 11 September 2026.

== International career ==
Briscoe was also rewarded for his fine club form in the early stages of the 2009 season by being included in the first batch of players to be called up to the England Elite Training squad.

Briscoe made his England debut, scoring a brace of tries against Wales in October 2009. Later that year he was selected in Englands Four Nations squad, playing against France and Australia. At the end of 2010, Briscoe played his first game for England outside of the United Kingdom, in a friendly match against a New Zealand Māori side and then went on to face the full New Zealand team in the Four Nations. In 2011, Briscoe was selected to face the rugby league at Headingley Carnegie Stadium in the first ever International Origin match. He subsequently became established in the England team.

Briscoe was selected in the England squad for the 2013 Rugby League World Cup.

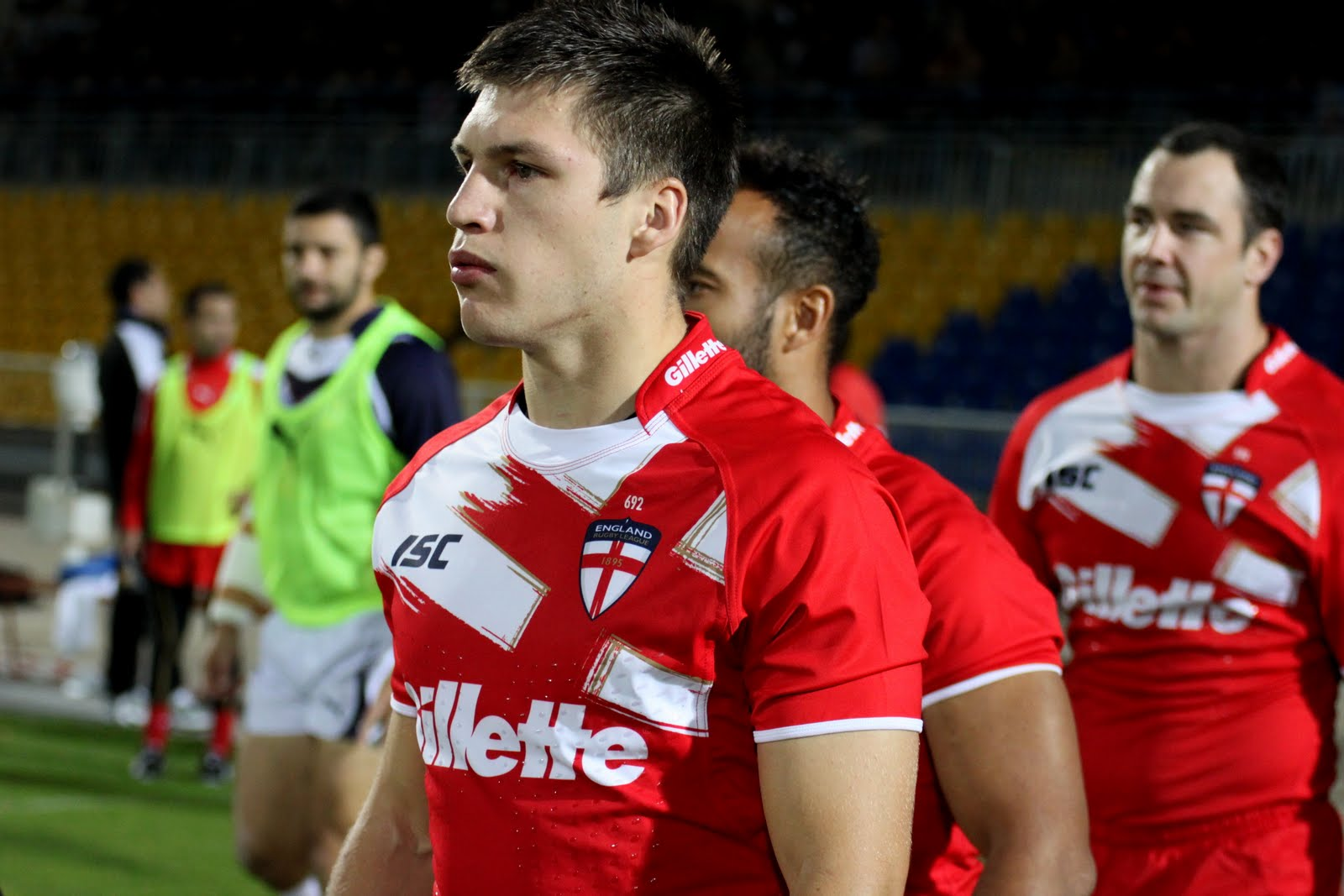
Briscoe with England in 2011

== Honours ==
=== Club ===
- Super League (2): 2015, 2017
- League Leader's Shield (1): 2015
- Challenge Cup (4): 2014, 2015, 2020, 2023

=== Individual ===
- Lance Todd Trophy (2015)
- Super League Dream Team (2011)

=== Records ===
- Most tries scored at Wembley in a single match: 5 (as of 2015)
