= Mike Burnett =

English rugby league footballer

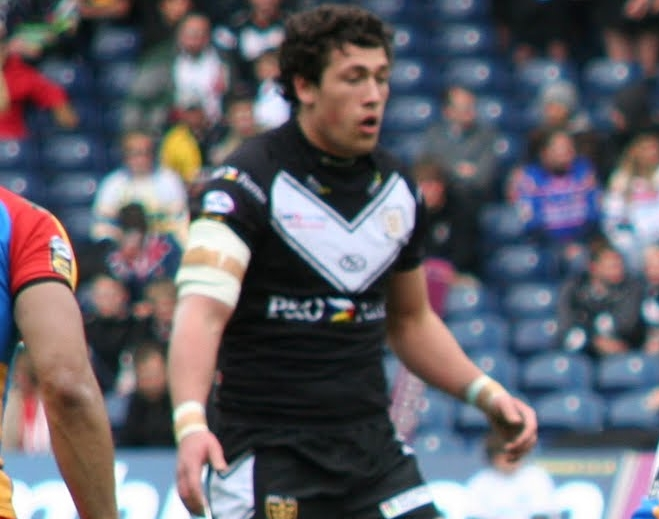

Personal information
- Full name: Michael Burnett
- Born: 6 October 1988 (age 37) Kingston upon Hull, Humberside, England

Playing information
- Height: 5 ft 11 in (1.80 m)
- Weight: 87 kg (13 st 10 lb)
- Position: Second-row
Club
Years	Team	Pld	T	G	FG	P
2008–10	Hull FC	38	4	0	0	16
2011(loan)	→ Harlequins RL	21	1	0	0	4
	Total	59	5	0	0	20

Mike Burnett (born 6 October 1988) is an English former professional rugby league footballer who played in the 2000s and 2010s for Hull F.C. and the Harlequins RL in the Super League. His position of choice was as a second-row.

== Background ==
Burnett was born in Kingston upon Hull, Humberside, England.

== Career ==
He was forced to retire from rugby league in 2012 due to a back injury.
