= 2023 Castleford Tigers season =

English rugby league season

Castleford Tigers 2023 season
- Super League rank: 11th
- Play-off result: Did not qualify
- Challenge Cup: Sixth round
- 2023 record: Wins: 6; draws: 0; losses: 22
- Points scored: For: 323; against: 774

Team information
- Chairman: Ian Fulton
- Head Coach: Lee Radford (sacked 6 March): Andy Last (sacked 4 August); Danny Ward
- Captain: Paul McShane
- Stadium: Wheldon Road
- Avg. attendance: 7,171
- Agg. attendance: 93,217
- High attendance: 10,042
- Low attendance: 5,788

Top scorers
- Tries: Greg Eden (9)
- Goals: Gareth Widdop (37)
- Points: Gareth Widdop (79)
Home colours	Away colours
← 2022	List of seasons	2024 →

The 2023 season was the Castleford Tigers' 98th season in the Rugby Football League and their 16th consecutive season in the top flight of English rugby league. The club competed in the 2023 Super League and the 2023 Challenge Cup.

Castleford began the season under head coach Lee Radford, before he was sacked in March and replaced by his assistant Andy Last. Last himself was dismissed after five months in charge, with Danny Ward appointed for the remainder of the campaign. The team was captained by Paul McShane, with Joe Westerman as interim in his absence. They finished the Super League season in 11th place, narrowly surviving a relegation battle with Wakefield.

== Season overview ==
Having finished the 2022 season in 7th place, falling short of play-off qualification on the final day, Castleford recruited high-profile signings including Gareth Widdop, Jacob Miller and Albert Vete. Going into Lee Radford's second year as head coach, expectations were mixed: a new-look spine was an enticing prospect, however the Tigers squad also had the league's highest average age.

Pre-season preparations were beset by coaching absences and disorganised, leaving the team on the back foot according to senior players Jordan Turner and Kenny Edwards. In a poor start to the season, Castleford fell to defeats against Hull FC and St Helens. A heavy loss to Wigan in round 3 proved a tipping point, with Radford relieved of his first-team duties on 6 March. Assistant coach Andy Last took charge of the team on an interim basis, while the club began a recruitment process for a permanent successor. Centre Jake Mamo also departed the squad on 15 March after announcing his retirement.

The Tigers registered their first win of the season in round 5 against the Leeds Rhinos, in between miserable losses to Huddersfield and Warrington. After a further defeat away to Catalans, they secured a Rivals Round victory over Wakefield. On 19 April, after overseeing two wins from six matches in charge, Last was appointed full-time head coach on a two-and-a-half-year deal. Castleford came close against Salford and Hull KR, but ultimately entered into a six-match losing streak, including elimination from the Challenge Cup at the first time of asking in front of a decade-low home crowd. In May, Craig Lingard was appointed as an assistant coach to Last.

The Magic Weekend provided the occasion of their third victory, with Qareqare's try and Widdop's conversion completing a comeback over Leeds. A large loss to Salford followed, with captain Paul McShane's season ended by a fractured forearm, although the Tigers consolidated with a win over out-of-form Warrington. Positioned 11th in the table and with bottom placed Wakefield picking up form, another lengthy losing streak began to build up the pressure on Castleford. A host of signings, including Liam Horne, Charbel Tasipale and Blake Austin, aimed to turn the tide back in Cas' favour - however, on 4 August, a comprehensive loss against Huddersfield sent the Tigers bottom on points difference, with a number of fans staging a protest. That evening, the club announced that Last would depart with immediate effect.

On 9 August, Castleford confirmed the appointment of Danny Ward as head coach on a deal until the end of the season, with Dane Dorahy joining as an assistant. The first fixture under the new staff saw a huge clash away at relegation rivals Wakefield, billed as the repeat of the 2006 'Battle of Belle Vue'. The Tigers started as underdogs but fought to a vital 28–12 victory, with Greg Eden scoring a hat-trick. Now with the upper hand, a win against Hull FC in Castleford's final home game all but guaranteed survival. Despite sustaining extremely heavy defeats against Warrington, Wigan and Leeds in the closing rounds, Castleford confirmed an 11th-placed finish, consigning Wakefield to the Championship and bringing a close to a disastrous and disappointing season. Joe Westerman was named both Castleford Player of the Year and Players' Player of the Year, and Jason Qareqare won a third consecutive Try of the Season award.

== First-team squad ==
2023 Castleford Tigers Squad
First team squad			Mid-season gains	Coaching staff
(England) 1 Niall Evalds – FB; (England) 2 Greg Eden – WG; (Jamaica) 3 Jordan Turner – CE; (Tonga) 4 Mahe Fonua – CE; (United States) 5 Bureta Faraimo – WG; (England) 6 Gareth Widdop (gk) – SO; (Australia) 7 Jacob Miller – SH; (England) 8 George Lawler – PR, LF; (England) 9 Paul McShane (c) – HK; (England) 10 George Griffin – PR; (Cook Islands) 11 Kenny Edwards – SR; (England) 12 Alex Mellor (vc) – SR; (England) 13 Joe Westerman – LF	(England) 14 Nathan Massey – PR; (England) 15 Alex Sutcliffe – SR; (England) 16 Adam Milner – LF, HK; (England) 17 Jack Broadbent – CE, SO; (Scotland) 18 Callum McLelland – SO; (Tonga) 19 Albert Vete – PR; (Nigeria) 20 Muizz Mustapha – PR; (Malta) 21 Jake Mamo – CE; (England) 22 Daniel Smith – PR; (Samoa) 23 Suaia Matagi – PR; (England) 24 Cain Robb – HK; (England) 25 Brad Martin – PR, SR; (Nigeria) 26 Elliot Wallis – WG	(England) 27 Bailey Dawson – SR; (England) 28 Sam Hall – PR; (England) 29 Kieran Hudson – PR; (England) 30 Jacob Hookem – SH; (Fiji) 31 Jason Qareqare – WG; (England) 32 Liam Watts – PR; (England) 33 Aaron Willis – PR, SR; (England) 34 George Hill – HK, LF; (England) 35 Ilikaya Mafi – LF, PR; (England) 36 Hugo Nikhata – WG; (England) 37 Danny Richardson (gk) – SH	(Jamaica) 38 Luis Johnson – SR; (England) 39 Will Tate – CE; (Ireland) 40 Riley Dean – SO; (England) 41 Jordan Johnstone – HK; (England) 42 Alex Foster – SR; (Greece) 43 Billy Tsikrikas – PR; (Lebanon) 44 Charbel Tasipale – CE; (Papua New Guinea) 45 Liam Horne – HK; (England) 46 Blake Austin – SO; (England) 47 Fletcher Rooney – FB; (England) Jacques O'Neill – LF, HK	Head coach: (England) Lee Radford (sacked 6 March); (England) Andy Last (sacked 4 August); (England) Danny Ward; Assistant coaches: (England) Craig Lingard; (Australia) Dane Dorahy; (England) Scott Murrell; Legend: (c) Captain(s); (vc) Vice-captain(s); (gk) Goal kicker

== Transfers and loans ==
=== Transfers in ===
No	Player	From	Contract	Date	Ref.
19	(Tonga) Albert Vete	Hull Kingston Rovers	2 years	23 September 2022	
20	(Nigeria) Muizz Mustapha	Leeds Rhinos	1 year (Note: With an option for a further year)	3 October 2022	
7	(Australia) Jacob Miller	Wakefield Trinity	3 years	4 October 2022	
6	(England) Gareth Widdop	Warrington Wolves	2 years	6 October 2022	
17	(England) Jack Broadbent	Leeds Rhinos	2 years	2 December 2022	
30	(England) Jacob Hookem	Hull FC	1 year	8 December 2022	
27	(England) Bailey Dawson	Hull Kingston Rovers	1 year	10 December 2022	
39	(England) Will Tate	Hull Kingston Rovers	2½ years	9 April 2023	
—	(England) Jacques O'Neill	Unaffiliated	½ year	20 April 2023	
45	(Papua New Guinea) Liam Horne	Norths Devils	1½ years	24 July 2023	
44	(Lebanon) Charbel Tasipale	Newtown Jets	1½ years	26 July 2023	

=== Loans in ===
No	Player	From	Loan type	Arrival	Return	Ref.
38	(Jamaica) Luis Johnson	Hull Kingston Rovers	Season long, two-week recall	2 April 2023	16 May 2023	
40	(Ireland) Riley Dean	Warrington Wolves	Season-long, two-week recall	13 June 2023	1 August 2023	
41	(England) Jordan Johnstone	Widnes Vikings	Season-long	4 July 2023	23 September 2023	
42	(England) Alex Foster	Newcastle Thunder	Season-long	20 July 2023	23 September 2023	
43	(Greece) Billy Tsikrikas	Canterbury Bulldogs	Season-long	20 July 2023	23 September 2023	
46	(England) Blake Austin	Leeds Rhinos	Season-long	3 August 2023	23 September 2023	

=== Transfers out ===
No	Player	To	Contract	Date	Ref.
6	(England) Jake Trueman	Hull FC	3 years	6 July 2022	
2	(England) Derrell Olpherts	Leeds Rhinos	2 years	26 August 2022	
20	(England) James Clare	Retired		26 August 2022	
24	(Australia) Cheyse Blair	Retired		26 August 2022	
26	(England) Ryan Hampshire	Wigan Warriors	1 year	26 August 2022	
30	(Tonga) Sosaia Feki	Retired		26 August 2022	
27	(England) Lewis Peachey	Sheffield Eagles	3 years	20 September 2022	
31	(England) Gareth O'Brien	Leigh Leopards	2 years	20 October 2022	
21	(Malta) Jake Mamo	Retired		15 March 2023	
22	(England) Daniel Smith	Featherstone Rovers	½ year	22 May 2023	
18	(Scotland) Callum McLelland	Midlands Hurricanes (Note: McLelland initially announced his retirement, but later joined the Midlands Hurricanes on a one-year deal)	1 year	21 June 2023	
4	(Tonga) Mahe Fonua	Doncaster	½ year	25 July 2023	
5	(United States) Bureta Faraimo	Doncaster	½ year	25 July 2023	

=== Loans out ===
No	Player	To	Loan type	Departure	Return	Ref.
19	(Tonga) Albert Vete	Featherstone Rovers	Two-week	5 April 2023	19 April 2023	
31	(Fiji) Jason Qareqare	Bradford Bulls	Two-week, rolling	20 April 2023	2 June 2023	
22	(England) Daniel Smith	Featherstone Rovers	Two-week	3 May 2023	Permanent (Note: The deal was made permanent on 22 May 2023)	
16	(England) Adam Milner	Huddersfield Giants	Season-long	25 May 2023	Permanent (Note: The deal was made permanent at the end of the season)	
27	(England) Bailey Dawson	Whitehaven	Two-week, rolling	30 June 2023	14 July 2023	
34	(England) George Hill	Whitehaven	Two-week, rolling	30 June 2023	27 September 2023	
—	(England) Will Groves (Note: Castleford Reserves player)	Whitehaven	Two-week, rolling	15 July 2023	27 September 2023	
19	(Tonga) Albert Vete	Doncaster	Season-long, two-week recall	27 July 2023	25 September 2023	
24	(England) Cain Robb	Swinton Lions	Season-long, recall	3 August 2023	4 September 2023	
15	(England) Alex Sutcliffe	Halifax Panthers	Season-long	4 August 2023	25 September 2023	
—	(England) Jacques O'Neill	Sheffield Eagles	Two-week, rolling	15 August 2023	29 August 2023	

=== Dual registration ===
Castleford also agreed dual registration arrangements with the Halifax Panthers in the Championship and the Midlands Hurricanes in League 1.

Club	No	Player	App	T	G	DG	Pts
Halifax Panthers	4	(Tonga) Mahe Fonua	1	0	0	0	0
Halifax Panthers	23	(Samoa) Suaia Matagi	1	0	0	0	0
Halifax Panthers	22	(England) Daniel Smith	1	0	0	0	0
Halifax Panthers	15	(England) Alex Sutcliffe (Note: He later rejoined Halifax on loan, but made 1 appearance while on dual registration)	1	0	0	0	0
Midlands Hurricanes	27	(England) Bailey Dawson	9	4	0	0	16
Midlands Hurricanes	28	(England) Sam Hall	1	0	0	0	0
Midlands Hurricanes	30	(England) Jacob Hookem	9	2	17	0	42
Midlands Hurricanes	25	(England) Brad Martin	3	2	0	0	8
Midlands Hurricanes	—	(England) Courage Mhuklani	2	0	0	0	0
Midlands Hurricanes	—	(England) Scott Murrell (Note: Castleford Reserves head coach and first-team assistant coach)	2	0	0	0	0
Midlands Hurricanes	31	(Fiji) Jason Qareqare	2	0	0	0	0
Midlands Hurricanes	26	(Nigeria) Elliot Wallis	3	3	0	0	12
Midlands Hurricanes	33	(England) Aaron Willis	14	2	0	0	8

Sources: RLRKC – Halifax Panthers 2023 & RLRKC – Midlands Hurricanes 2023

== Pre-season friendlies ==
Date	Opposition	H/A	Venue	Result	Score	Tries	Goals	Source
Sat 31 December	Featherstone Rovers	A	Post Office Road	L	10–26	Wallis, Broadbent	Hookem (1/2)	
Sun 22 January (Note: Jake Webster's testimonial match)	Keighley Cougars	A	Cougar Park	(P)	P–P (Note: Postponed due to a frozen pitch)			
Sun 29 January	Whitehaven R.L.F.C.	A	LEL Arena	W	38–4	Faraimo (2), Broadbent (2), Mellor, Mamo, Lawler	Hookem (5/7)	
Sun 5 February (Note: Nathan Massey's testimonial match)	Huddersfield Giants	H	Wheldon Road	W	48–10	Mellor, McShane (2), Faraimo (3), Fonua (2), Vete	Widdop (5/8), Massey (1/1)	

== Super League ==
=== Results ===
Date	Round	Opposition	H/A	Venue	Result	Score	Tries	Goals	Drop goals	Attendance	Source
Sun 19 February	1	Hull FC	A	MKM Stadium	L	30–32	Faraimo (2), Edwards, Miller, Mamo	Widdop (5/5)		15,383	
Sun 26 February	2	St Helens	H	Wheldon Road	L	6–24	Broadbent	Widdop (1/1)		10,042	
Fri 3 March (Note: Lee Radford's final match as head coach)	3	Wigan Warriors	H	Wheldon Road	L	0–36				7,565	
Fri 10 March (Note: Andy Last's first match as interim head coach)	4	Huddersfield Giants	A	Kirklees Stadium	L	6–36	Lawler	Widdop (1/1)		4,071	
Thu 16 March	5	Leeds Rhinos	H	Wheldon Road	W	14–8	Faraimo (2)	Widdop (3/4)		7,458	
Fri 24 March	6	Warrington Wolves	H	Wheldon Road	L	0–38				7,348	
Sat 1 April	7	Catalans Dragons	A	Stade Gilbert Brutus	L	18–22	Broadbent (2), Turner	McShane (3/3)		8,109	
Thu 6 April	8	Wakefield Trinity	H	Wheldon Road	W	16–4	McShane, Eden (2)	McShane (2/3)		8,075	
Thu 13 April	9	Salford Red Devils	A	AJ Bell Stadium	L	6–14	Eden	Widdop (1/1)		4,468	
Fri 21 April (Note: Andy Last's first match as permanent head coach)	10	Hull KR	H	Wheldon Road	L	7–12	Miller	McShane (1/1)	Miller	7,110	
Fri 5 May	11	Leigh Leopards	A	Leigh Sports Village	L	6–30	Westerman	Widdop (1/1)		5,423	
Fri 12 May	12	Catalans Dragons	H	Wheldon Road	L	22–46	Mellor (2), Faraimo (2)	Widdop (1/1), McShane (2/3)		5,788	
Fri 26 May	13	Huddersfield Giants	A	Kirklees Stadium	L	4–20	Mellor	Widdop (0/1)		4,206	
Sat 3 June	14	Leeds Rhinos	N	St James' Park	W	26–24	Miller, Wallis, Mellor (2), Qareqare	Widdop (3/5)		36,943	
Fri 9 June	15	Salford Red Devils	H	Wheldon Road	L	10–42	Qareqare, Edwards	Widdop (1/2)		6,354	
Fri 23 June	16	Warrington Wolves	H	Wheldon Road	W	23–14	Tate, Qareqare, Broadbent	Widdop (5/7)	Widdop	6,066	
Fri 30 June	17	St Helens	A	Totally Wicked Stadium	L	0–22				11,488	
Fri 7 July	18	Leigh Leopards	H	Wheldon Road	L	16–34	Widdop, Wallis (2)	Widdop (2/3)		6,344	
Sat 15 July	19	Hull FC	A	MKM Stadium	L	18–36	Wallis, Broadbent, Faraimo	Widdop (3/4)		12,352	
Fri 28 July	20	Hull KR	A	Craven Park	L	16–34	Tate, Broadbent, Eden	Dean (2/3)		8,800	
Fri 4 August (Note: Andy Last's final match as head coach)	21	Huddersfield Giants	H	Wheldon Road	L	0–28				6,452	
Fri 18 August (Note: Danny Ward's first match as head coach)	22	Wakefield Trinity	A	Belle Vue	W	28–12	Tasipale, Eden (3), Foster	Widdop (4/6)		4,710	
Fri 25 August	23	St Helens	H	Wheldon Road	L	4–34	Turner	Widdop (0/1)		6,668	
Sat 2 September	24	Warrington Wolves	A	Halliwell Jones Stadium	L	12–66	Hall, Eden	Widdop (2/2)		9,103	
Fri 8 September	25	Hull FC	H	Wheldon Road	W	29–12	Qareqare (2), Eden, Foster, Turner	Widdop (4/6)	Austin	7,947	
Fri 15 September	26	Wigan Warriors	A	DW Stadium	L	6–48	Qareqare	Austin (1/1)		13,109	
Fri 22 September	27	Leeds Rhinos	A	Headingley Stadium	L	0–46				15,109	

=== League table ===
Pos	Team	Pld	W	D	L	PF	PA	PD	Pts	Qualification
1	Wigan Warriors (L, C)	27	20	0	7	722	360	+362	40	Qualification to Semi-finals
2	Catalans Dragons	27	20	0	7	722	420	+302	40	Qualification to Semi-finals
3	St. Helens	27	20	0	7	613	366	+247	40	Qualification to Eliminators
4	Hull Kingston Rovers	27	16	0	11	589	498	+91	32	Qualification to Eliminators
5	Leigh Leopards	27	16	0	11	585	508	+77	32	Qualification to Eliminators
6	Warrington Wolves	27	14	0	13	597	512	+85	28	Qualification to Eliminators
7	Salford Red Devils	27	13	0	14	494	512	−18	26	
8	Leeds Rhinos	27	12	0	15	535	534	+1	24	
9	Huddersfield Giants	27	11	0	16	473	552	−79	22	
10	Hull FC	27	10	0	17	476	654	−178	20	
11	Castleford Tigers	27	6	0	21	323	774	−451	12	
12	Wakefield Trinity (R)	27	4	0	23	303	742	−439	8	Relegation to Championship

Source: Super League
(C) Champions; (L) League Leaders' Shield Winners; (R) Relegated

=== Results summary ===
Head coach	Overall (Note: Includes the Magic Weekend fixture at a neutral venue, St James' Park)						Home						Away					
Head coach	Pld	W	L	PF	PA	PD	Pld	W	L	PF	PA	PD	Pld	W	L	PF	PA	PD
(England) Lee Radford	3	0	3	36	92	-56	2	0	2	6	60	-54	1	0	1	30	32	-2
(England) Andy Last	18	4	14	208	464	-256	9	3	6	108	226	-118	8	0	8	74	214	-140
(England) Danny Ward	6	2	4	79	218	-139	2	1	1	33	46	-13	4	1	3	46	172	-126
Total	27	6	21	323	774	-451	13	4	9	147	332	-185	13	1	12	150	418	-268

== Challenge Cup ==
=== Results ===
Date	Round	Opposition	H/A	Venue	Result	Score	Tries	Goals	Drop goals	Attendance	Source
Sun 21 May	6	Hull FC	H	Wheldon Road	L	8–32	Fonua, Tate	McShane (0/1), Hookem (0/1)		4,249	

== Player statistics ==
=== Summary ===
Appearances and points in all competitions
No	Player	App	T	G	DG	Pts	Temporarily suspended	Sent off (straight red)
1	(England) Niall Evalds	7	0	0	0	0	0	0
2	(England) Greg Eden	15	9	0	0	36	0	0
3	(Jamaica) Jordan Turner	21	3	0	0	12	0	0
4	(Tonga) Mahe Fonua	10	1	0	0	4	0	0
5	(United States) Bureta Faraimo	14	7	0	0	28	0	0
6	(England) Gareth Widdop	21	1	37	1	79	0	0
7	(Australia) Jacob Miller	26	3	0	1	13	1	0
8	(England) George Lawler	20	1	0	0	4	0	0
9	(England) Paul McShane	15	1	8	0	20	0	0
10	(England) George Griffin	22	0	0	0	0	0	0
11	(Cook Islands) Kenny Edwards	25	2	0	0	8	0	0
12	(England) Alex Mellor	26	5	0	0	20	0	0
13	(England) Joe Westerman	23	1	0	0	4	1	0
14	(England) Nathan Massey	20	0	0	0	0	0	0
15	(England) Alex Sutcliffe	7	0	0	0	0	0	0
16	(England) Adam Milner	9	0	0	0	0	0	0
17	(England) Jack Broadbent	26	6	0	0	24	0	0
18	(Scotland) Callum McLelland	0	0	0	0	0	0	0
19	(Tonga) Albert Vete	6	0	0	0	0	0	0
20	(Nigeria) Muizz Mustapha	16	0	0	0	0	0	0
21	(Malta) Jake Mamo	2	1	0	0	4	0	0
22	(England) Daniel Smith	5	0	0	0	0	0	0
23	(Samoa) Suaia Matagi	15	0	0	0	0	0	0
24	(England) Cain Robb	8	0	0	0	0	0	0
25	(England) Brad Martin	9	0	0	0	0	0	0
26	(Nigeria) Elliot Wallis	13	4	0	0	16	0	0
27	(England) Bailey Dawson	0	0	0	0	0	0	0
28	(England) Sam Hall	16	1	0	0	4	0	0
29	(England) Kieran Hudson	0	0	0	0	0	0	0
30	(England) Jacob Hookem	1	0	0	0	0	0	0
31	(Fiji) Jason Qareqare	10	6	0	0	24	0	0
32	(England) Liam Watts	20	0	0	0	0	2	0
33	(England) Aaron Willis	1	0	0	0	0	0	0
34	(England) George Hill	0	0	0	0	0	0	0
35	(England) Ilikaya Mafi	0	0	0	0	0	0	0
36	(England) Hugo Nikhata	0	0	0	0	0	0	0
37	(England) Danny Richardson	0	0	0	0	0	0	0
38	(Jamaica) Luis Johnson	3	0	0	0	0	0	0
39	(England) Will Tate	7	3	0	0	12	0	0
40	(Ireland) Riley Dean	4	0	2	0	4	0	0
41	(England) Jordan Johnstone	8	0	0	0	0	0	0
42	(England) Alex Foster	6	2	0	0	8	0	0
43	(Greece) Billy Tsikrikas	4	0	0	0	0	0	0
44	(Lebanon) Charbel Tasipale	4	1	0	0	4	0	0
45	(Papua New Guinea) Liam Horne	5	0	0	0	0	0	0
46	(England) Blake Austin	5	0	1	1	3	1	0
47	(England) Fletcher Rooney	1	0	0	0	0	0	0

Source: RLRKC – Castleford Tigers 2023

=== Appearances ===
Positions key:
FB = Fullback	RW = Right wing	RC = Right centre	LC = Left centre	LW = Left wing	SO = Stand-off	SH = Scrum half
PR = Prop	HK = Hooker	SR = Second row	LF = Loose forward	R = Replacement	18 = 18th man	(* = Non-playing)

Appearances and positions in each fixture
No	Player	SL												CC	SL														
No	Player	1	2	3	4	5	6	7	8	9	10	11	12	R6	13	14	15	16	17	18	19	20	21	22	23	24	25	26	27
1	(England) Niall Evalds	FB	FB	FB					FB	FB		FB	FB																
2	(England) Greg Eden		18*	LW	LW	FB	FB	FB	LW	LW	FB											LW	LW	LW		LW	SH	FB	LW
3	(Jamaica) Jordan Turner	LC	LC				LC	LC	LC	LC	LC	LC		LC	LC	LC	LC	LC	LC	LC				RC	LC	LC	LC	LC	LC
4	(Tonga) Mahe Fonua	RC		LC	LC	LC		LW	RC	18*	LW			RW			RC				RC								
5	(United States) Bureta Faraimo	RW	RW	RW		RW	RW	RW	RW	RW	RW	RW	RW		RW			18*		RW	RW								
6	(England) Gareth Widdop	SO	SO	SO	SO	SO	SO			SO		SO	SO		FB	FB	FB	FB	FB	FB	FB		FB	FB	FB	FB	FB		
7	(Australia) Jacob Miller	SH	SH	SH	SH	SH	SH	SH	SH	SH	SH	SH	SH		SH	SH	SH	SH	SH	SH	SH	SH	SH	SH	SH	SH		SH	SH
8	(England) George Lawler	R	LF	PR	HK			R	R	PR	PR	PR	PR	HK	SR	SR						SR	PR	PR	LF	HK		SR	LF
9	(England) Paul McShane	HK	HK	HK		HK	HK	HK	HK	HK	HK	HK	HK	SH	HK	HK	HK												
10	(England) George Griffin	R	PR				R	SR	SR	R	PR	R	SR	R		R	PR	PR	PR	PR	R	PR	18*	R	PR	PR	R	R	
11	(Cook Islands) Kenny Edwards	SR	SR	SR	SR	R	R	SR	R	SR	SR	SR			SR	SR	SR	SR	SR	SR	SR	SR	SR	SR	SR	SR	SR		SR
12	(England) Alex Mellor	SR	SR	SR	SR	SR	SR	RC	SR	SR	RC	R	LC	SR	RC	RC		RC	RC	SR	SR	RC	LC		SR	SR	SR	SR	SR
13	(England) Joe Westerman	LF		LF	LF	LF	LF	LF	LF		LF	LF	LF	SO	LF	LF	LF	LF		LF	LF	LF	LF	LF	SO	LF	LF		
14	(England) Nathan Massey	PR		R	PR	PR	PR	PR	PR	PR		PR	PR	PR	PR		R	HK				R	R	R			R	R	PR
15	(England) Alex Sutcliffe				RC		18*							RC			SR	SR	SR	R	R	18*							
16	(England) Adam Milner	18*	R	R	R	SR	SR			LF	SR	SR	SR																
17	(England) Jack Broadbent	R	RC	RC	FB	RC	RC	SO	SO	RC	SO	RC	RC	FB	SO	SO	SO	SO	HK	RC	LC	FB	SO	LC			RC	RC	RC
18	(Scotland) Callum McLelland																												
19	(Tonga) Albert Vete		PR	PR	18*	18*	R	R											R		PR								
20	(Nigeria) Muizz Mustapha		R		R	PR		R	R					R	R	R	R	R	R	R	R						PR	PR	R
21	(Malta) Jake Mamo	LW	LW																										
22	(England) Daniel Smith			18*	R	R	PR	R	18*	R																			
23	(Samoa) Suaia Matagi	R		R	PR	R		PR	PR		R		R	PR	PR	PR						R	PR	R				18*	PR
24	(England) Cain Robb		R									R	18*	R	18*	18*	R	R	R	R	18*						R		
25	(England) Brad Martin											18*		SR	R	R	PR	R	R	18*					18*	R	18*	R	R
26	(Nigeria) Elliot Wallis											LW	LW		LW	LW				LW	LW	RW	RW	RW	RW	RW	RW	RW	
27	(England) Bailey Dawson																												
28	(England) Sam Hall									R	R	R	R	LF	R	R		R	LF	R	R		R		R	PR		LF	R
29	(England) Kieran Hudson																												
30	(England) Jacob Hookem							18*						R			18*		18*										
31	(Fiji) Jason Qareqare				RW	LW	LW									RW	RW	LW	LW							18*	LW	LW	RW
32	(England) Liam Watts	PR	R	R	R	R	R				R		R		R	PR		PR	PR	PR	PR	PR		PR	PR		PR	PR	R
33	(England) Aaron Willis																R												
34	(England) George Hill													18*															
35	(England) Ilikaya Mafi																												
36	(England) Hugo Nikhata																												
37	(England) Danny Richardson																												
38	(Jamaica) Luis Johnson								R	R	18*		R																
39	(England) Will Tate										R			LW			LW	RW	RW			LC			LW				
40	(Ireland) Riley Dean																		SO	SO	SO	SO							
41	(England) Jordan Johnstone																			HK	HK	HK	HK	18*	R	R	HK	R	18*
42	(England) Alex Foster																					R	SR	R	R	R	R		
43	(Greece) Billy Tsikrikas																					R	R		R	R			
44	(Lebanon) Charbel Tasipale																						RC	SR	RC	RC			
45	(Papua New Guinea) Liam Horne																						R	HK	HK			HK	HK
46	(England) Blake Austin																							SO		SO	SO	SO	SO
47	(England) Fletcher Rooney																												FB

Sources: RLRKC – Castleford Tigers 2023 & RLP – Castleford Tigers 2023
