= 2022 Castleford Tigers season =

English rugby league season

Castleford Tigers 2022 season
- Super League rank: 7th
- Play-off result: Did not qualify
- Challenge Cup: Quarter-final
- 2022 record: Wins: 14; draws: 0; losses: 15
- Points scored: For: 594; against: 670

Team information
- Chairman: Ian Fulton
- Head Coach: Lee Radford
- Captain: Paul McShane
- Stadium: The Jungle (Wheldon Road)
- Avg. attendance: 7,543
- Agg. attendance: 98,058
- High attendance: 10,500
- Low attendance: 5,672

Top scorers
- Tries: Derrell Olpherts (18)
- Goals: Gareth O'Brien (49)
- Points: Gareth O'Brien (115)
Home colours	Away colours
← 2021	List of seasons	2023 →

The 2022 season was the Castleford Tigers' 97th season in the Rugby Football League and their 15th consecutive season in the top flight of English rugby league. The club competed in the 2022 Super League and the 2022 Challenge Cup.

This was Castleford's first season under Lee Radford as head coach. The team was captained by Paul McShane. They finished the Super League season in 7th place, falling short of play-off qualification in the final round.

== Pre-season friendlies ==
Date and time	Versus	H/A	Venue	Result	Score	Tries	Goals	Attendance	Report
16 January, 15:00	York City Knights	A	LNER Stadium	W	32–10	Faraimo (2), Vasuitoga, Mamo, Sutcliffe, Morley,	Richardson (4/6)		
23 January, 15:00	Doncaster	A	Keepmoat Stadium	W	66–18	Fonua, Olpherts (2), Evalds, Robb, Richardson, Sutcliffe (2), Blair, Qareqare, Collins	Richardson (8/8), Sadler (3/3)		

== Super League ==
=== Results ===
Win Loss

Date and time	Round	Versus	H/A	Venue	Result	Score	Tries	Goals	Attendance	TV	Report
11 February, 20:00	1	Salford Red Devils	H	Mend-A-Hose Jungle	L	16–26	Griffin, Olpherts (2)	Richardson (2)	10,500	Not televised	
17 February, 20:00	2	Warrington Wolves	A	Halliwell Jones Stadium	L	10–34	Olpherts, Trueman	O'Brien	8,468	Sky Sports	
25 February, 20:00	3	Hull KR	A	Hull College Community Stadium	L	10–26	Turner, Faraimo	O'Brien	7,119	Sky Sports	
6 March 2022, 15:30	4	Hull FC	H	Mend-A-Hose Jungle	W	33–26	Smith, Eden (3), Blair, O'Brien	O'Brien (4), O'Brien 1 DG	10,072	Not televised	
12 March 2022, 15:15	5	Huddersfield Giants	A	John Smiths Stadium	L	24–36	Trueman (2), Fonua, Eden	O'Brien (4)	5,717	Sky Sports	
17 March 2022, 20:00	6	Wigan Warriors	A	DW Stadium	L	22–32	Eden, Griffin, Trueman, Mamo	O'Brien (3)	10,042	Sky Sports	
1 April 2022, 20:00	7	Toulouse Olympique	H	Mend-A-Hose Jungle	W	32–6	Eden, Evalds, Milner, Mamo, Watts	O'Brien (6)	7,067	Not televised	
14 April 2022, 19:45	8	Wakefield Trinity	A	The Mobile Rocket Stadium	W	34-4	Fonua, Matagi, McShane, Edwards, Eden	O'Brien (7)	5,557	Not televised	
18 April 2022, 15:00	9	Leeds Rhinos	H	Mend-A-Hose Jungle	W	16–14	Clare, Olpherts, Watts	O'Brien (2)	9,372	Sky Sports	
22 April 2022, 20:00	10	St Helens	H	Mend-A-Hose Jungle	W	30–10	Qareqare, Olpherts (2), Trueman, Westerman, Fonua	McShane (3)	7,649	Sky Sports	
29 April 2022, 19:30	11	Catalans Dragons	A	Stade Gilbert Brutus	L	12–44	O'Brien, Qareqare	O'Brien (2)	6,487	Not televised	
15 May 2022, 15:30	12	Hull KR	H	Mend-A-Hose Jungle	W	32–0	Griffin, Edwards, Mamo (2), Qareqare (2)	O'Brien (4)	8,175	Not televised	
20 May 2022, 20:00	13	Salford Red Devils	A	AJ Bell Stadium	L	14–30	Hampshire, Qareqare (2)	O'Brien	5,355	Sky Sports	
4 June 2022, 14:00	14	Wigan Warriors	H	Mend-A-Hose Jungle	L	12–32	Eden, Edwards	O'Brien (2)	6,497	Channel 4	
12 June 2022, 14:30	15	Toulouse Olympique	A	Stade Ernest Wallon	W	20–14	Matagi, Griffin, Fonua	Richardson (4)	3,326	Not televised	
26 June 2022, 15:30	16	Catalans Dragons	H	Mend-A-Hose Jungle	W	17–16 (Note: After golden-point extra time)	Blair, Hampshire, Olpherts	Richardson (2), Richardson 1 DG	6,510	Not televised	
1 July 2022, 20:00	17	Huddersfield Giants	H	Mend-A-Hose Jungle	W	26–18	Olpherts (2), Trueman, Mamo	Richardson (5)	5,672	Sky Sports	
9 July 2022, 19:00	18	Leeds Rhinos	N	St James' Park	L	20–34	Mamo, Faraimo (2), Fonua	Richardson (2)	36,821	Sky Sports	
16 July 2022, 15:00	19	Warrington Wolves	H	Mend-A-Hose Jungle	W	35–22	Olpherts (2), Richardson, Evalds, Qareqare, Sutcliffe	Richardson (5), Richardson 1DG	6,279	Sky Sports	
22 July 2022, 20:00	20	Hull FC	A	KCOM Stadium	W	46–18	Olpherts (4), Faraimo (2), Matagi, Sutcliffe	Richardson (7)	9,550	Sky Sports	
29 July 2022, 20:00	21	Wakefield Trinity	H	Mend-A-Hose Jungle	L	6–32	Richardson	Richardson	6,796	Sky Sports	
7 August 2022, 13:00	22	St Helens	A	Totally Wicked Stadium	L	12–20	Faraimo (3)		10,144	Channel 4	
12 August 2022, 20:00	23	Catalans Dragons	H	Mend-A-Hose Jungle	W	18–8	O'Brien, Eden	O'Brien (5)	6,147	Not televised	
18 August 2022, 20:00	24	Huddersfield Giants	A	John Smiths Stadium	L	10–36	Eden, Mellor	Richardson	4,168	Sky Sports	
25 August 2022, 20:00	25	Warrington Wolves	A	Halliwell Jones Stadium	W	19–18	Olpherts (2), Mamo	Richardson (3); Richardson 1 DG	8,104	Not televised	
29 August 2022, 15:30	26	Salford Red Devils	H	Mend-A-Hose Jungle	L	10–50	Olpherts, Mamo	Richardson	7,322	Sky Sports	
3 September 2022, 19:00	27	Leeds Rhinos	A	Headingley	L	6–14	Mamo	McShane (2)	15,418	Sky Sports	

=== League table ===
Pos	Team	Pld	W	D	L	PF	PA	PD	Pts	Qualification
1	St Helens (C, L)	27	21	0	6	674	374	+300	42	Advance to semi-finals
2	Wigan Warriors	27	19	0	8	818	483	+335	38	Advance to semi-finals
3	Huddersfield Giants	27	17	1	9	613	497	+116	35	Advance to elimination finals
4	Catalans Dragons	27	16	0	11	539	513	+26	32	Advance to elimination finals
5	Leeds Rhinos	27	14	1	12	577	528	+49	29	Advance to elimination finals
6	Salford Red Devils	27	14	0	13	700	602	+98	28	Advance to elimination finals
7	Castleford Tigers	27	13	0	14	544	620	−76	26	
8	Hull Kingston Rovers	27	12	0	15	498	608	−110	24	
9	Hull FC	27	11	0	16	508	675	−167	22	
10	Wakefield Trinity	27	10	0	17	497	648	−151	20	
11	Warrington Wolves	27	9	0	18	568	664	−96	18	
12	Toulouse Olympique (R)	27	5	0	22	421	745	−324	10	Relegated to the Championship

(C) Champions; (L) League Leaders' Shield winners; (R) Relegated

== Challenge Cup ==
=== Results ===
Win Draw Loss Postponed

Date and time	Round	Versus	H/A	Venue	Result	Score	Tries	Goals	Attendance	TV	Report
26 March 2022, 16:30	6	Leeds Rhinos	A	Headingley	W	40–16	Trueman, Mamo, O'Brien, Turner, Lawler, Eden (2)	O'Brien (6)	5,112	BBC	
8 April 2022, 19:45	QF	Hull KR	A	Sewell Group Craven Park	L	10–34	Eden (2)	O'Brien	4,887		

== Transfers and loans ==
=== Gains ===
Player	Club	Contract	Date
(England) Joe Westerman	Wakefield Trinity	2 Years	June 2021
(Australia) Jake Mamo	Warrington Wolves	3 Years	July 2021
(United States) Bureta Faraimo	Hull F.C.	2 Years	August 2021
(England) Alex Sutcliffe	Leeds Rhinos	2 Years	September 2021
(New Zealand) Kenny Edwards	Huddersfield Giants	1 Year Loan	September 2021
(Samoa) Suaia Matagi	Huddersfield Giants	2 Years	October 2021
(England) George Lawler	Hull KR	2 Years	October 2021
(Scotland) Callum McLelland	Leeds Rhinos	2 Years	October 2021
(Tonga) Mahe Fonua	Hull FC	1 Year	October 2021

=== Losses ===
Player	Club	Contract	Date
(Tonga) Peter Mata’utia	Warrington Wolves	2 Years	June 2021
(England) Oliver Holmes	Warrington Wolves	3 Years	June 2021
(Australia) Grant Millington	Retired	—N/a	August 2021
(Tonga) Jesse Sene-Lefao	Released	—N/a	September 2021
(England) Alex Foster	Released	—N/a	September 2021
(England) Michael Shenton	Retired	—N/a	September 2021
(Republic of Ireland) Lewis Bienek	London Broncos	2 Years	September 2021

== First-team squad ==
2022 Castleford Tigers Squad
First team squad			Coaching staff
(England) 1 Niall Evalds – FB; (England) 2 Derrell Olpherts – WG; (Jamaica) 3 Jordan Turner – CE; (Australia) 4 Jake Mamo – CE, FB; (United States) 5 Bureta Faraimo – WG; (England) 6 Jake Trueman – SO, SH; (England) 7 Danny Richardson (gk) – SH; (England) 8 Liam Watts (vc) – PR; (England) 9 Paul McShane (c) – HK, SO; (England) 10 George Lawler – PR, SR, HK; (New Zealand) 11 Kenny Edwards – SR, LF; (England) 12 Adam Milner – SR, LF, HK; (England) 13 Joe Westerman – LF, PR	(England) 14 Nathan Massey – PR, LF; (England) 15 George Griffin – PR; (Scotland) 16 Callum McLelland – SO, SH; (Tonga) 17 Mahe Fonua – CE; (England) 18 Jacques O'Neill – HK, LF; (New Zealand) 19 Tyla Hepi – PR; (England) 20 James Clare – WG; (England) 21 Alex Sutcliffe – SR, CE; (England) 22 Daniel Smith – PR; (England) 23 Greg Eden – WG, FB, SO; (Australia) 24 Cheyse Blair – SR, CE; (Samoa) 25 Suaia Matagi – PR; (England) 26 Ryan Hampshire – FB, SO	(England) 27 Lewis Peachey – SR; (England) 28 Brad Martin – PR, SR; (England) 29 Sam Hall – PR; (Tonga) 30 Sosaia Feki – WG; (England) 31 Gareth O'Brien (gk) – SH, FB; (England) 32 Cain Robb – HK; (Fiji) 33 Jason Qareqare – WG; (England) 34 Jack Sadler – SO; (England) 35 Nathan Carter – SR; (England) 36 Mackenzie Scurr – WG; (England) 37 Alex Mellor – SR; (England) 38 Kieran Hudson – PR	Head coach: Lee Radford; Assistant coach: Andy Last; Legend: (c) Captain(s); (vc) Vice-captain(s); (gk) Goal kicker(s)
