= Jason Qareqare =

Fiji international rugby league footballer

Personal information
- Full name: Balami Jason Qareqare
- Born: 26 January 2004 (age 22) Lautoka, Fiji
- Height: 5 ft 11 in (1.80 m)
- Weight: 13 st 8 lb (86 kg)

Playing information
- Position: Wing
Club
Years	Team	Pld	T	G	FG	P
2021–	Castleford Tigers	61	41	0	0	164
2023(DR)	→ Midlands Hurricanes	2	0	0	0	0
2023(loan)	→ Bradford Bulls	2	0	0	0	0
	Total	65	41	0	0	164
Representative
Years	Team	Pld	T	G	FG	P
2022–	Fiji	2	1	0	0	4
- Source: As of 24 July 2026

Jason Qareqare (Fijian pronunciation: [ŋɡareŋɡare]; born 26 January 2004) is a Fijian professional rugby league footballer who plays as a winger for the Castleford Tigers in the Super League.

He has spent time on loan or dual registration at Bradford Bulls in the RFL Championship, and at Midlands Hurricanes in RFL League 1.

== Background ==
Qareqare was born in Lautoka, Fiji. As the son of a British Army soldier, he lived in Osnabrück, Germany for four years before his family relocated to Yorkshire in 2008.

Growing up, he previously played football with York City and rugby union with Ripon RUFC and school teams. He was inspired to take up rugby league by Fiji's run to the 2013 Rugby League World Cup semi-finals as well as due to the sport's popularity in the area. He played junior rugby league for the Kippax Knights before signing for the Castleford Tigers academy aged 14.

Qareqare attended Sherburn High School. He joined Queen Ethelburga's Collegiate on a rugby union scholarship, where he studied Maths, Sport and Business, while training part-time with Castleford.

His younger brother, Marcus Qareqare, is also a rugby league player and progressed through the Leeds Rhinos academy ranks.

== Club career ==
=== Castleford Tigers ===
==== 2021–22 ====
On 10 June 2021, 17-year-old Qareqare was given a late call-up into the Castleford Tigers side to face Hull FC. Having been expected to play for the under-19s that weekend, he received a phone call from first team head coach Daryl Powell while in maths class at school, to tell him he would make his Super League debut. He started on the left wing and, inside the first minute, rounded Hull fullback Jake Connor to score a try with his first touch of the ball. This was nominated for Super League Try of the Month, and was later voted Castleford's Try of the Year despite strong competition. He went on to make two further appearances in 2021, featuring off the bench against Wakefield and starting at fullback in a youthful side against Salford.

Qareqare signed a two-year contract extension with Castleford in April 2022. In his first start of the 2022 season on 22 April, he once again scored a long-range try in the first minute with his first touch of the ball, beating four St Helens defenders on the touchline. This score went on to be voted Super League Try of the Month, and in December was voted Super League Try of the Season. On 15 May, he scored two tries in Castleford's victory over Hull Kingston Rovers. The following week, Qareqare scored his second consecutive brace against Salford, with his "pace and skill in tight situations evidenced by his sublime finishes". He finished the season with 7 tries in 8 appearances.

===== Whitehaven (loan) =====
On 22 July 2022, Qareqare joined Whitehaven in the RFL Championship on loan, alongside teammate Cain Robb. However, the following week, they were both recalled to Castleford without having made an appearance, as the Tigers were unable to name a full 21-man squad due to mounting injury issues.

===== Midlands Hurricanes (dual registration) =====
Qareqare made two appearances for the Midlands Hurricanes in the RFL League 1 in 2023, through their dual registration agreement with Castleford.

===== Bradford Bulls (loan) =====
On 20 April 2023, it was announced that Qareqare had joined the Bradford Bulls in the Championship on an initial two-week loan deal, continuing on a rolling basis. Tigers head coach Andy Last explained the move; "Jason is a player with huge potential and we want to create a pathway for him. Jason needs to work on some aspects of his game and getting some consistent rugby at Bradford will stretch him a little bit more than the reserves." In June, having made two appearances, he was recalled to Castleford.

==== 2023–26 ====
For the 2023 season, Qareqare switched from squad number 33 to 31. After being recalled from loan in June, he scored the late winning try for Castleford in their 26–24 victory against Leeds Rhinos at the 2023 Magic Weekend. He scored again in the two following rounds against Salford and Warrington. In round 25, Qareqare scored two tries for Castleford in their 29–12 victory over Hull FC. The second of these, a length-of-the-field interception from a Hull scrum play, went on to be voted Castleford's Try of the Season.

In 2024, Qareqare started in the opening rounds but suffered an ankle injury on 25 February, expected to keep him out for two months. On 17 May, Castleford announced that Qareqare had signed a further two-year contract extension. The following week, on his return from injury against Hull in round 12, he scored a try and assisted another for Tex Hoy. He scored two tries against Salford in round 19 and repeated this feat against Huddersfield in round 22. Qareqare was rested for one game in August as a precautionary measure for a tight hamstring, but otherwise featured in every round from May, making 17 appearances.

Qareqare was promoted to Castleford's number 2 for the 2025 season. During pre-season training, he sustained a hamstring injury which forced him to miss the opening two months of the campaign. In round 8, Qareqare marked his return to the team with two tries against Wakefield; the first of these was named Castleford's Try of the Season, his fourth such award. However, in the final minute of the match, he suffered a recurrence of the hamstring injury. This required surgery and necessitated a further four-month lay-off. Though he returned to the Tigers' 21-man squad for the final two rounds, Qareqare was rested and made no further appearances.

In the opening months of the 2026 season, Qareqare established a left-edge partnership with centre signing Krystian Mapapalangi. He was named Tigers' player of the match against St Helens in the Challenge Cup, and scored his first career hat-trick in Castleford's 40–28 win against Bradford Bulls in round 6. He scored a second hat-trick in Castleford's 30–10 victory over St Helens in round 12. Amid transfer speculation following an "aggressive bid" from York Knights, on 17 June Castleford agreed a new three-year contract for the in-demand Qareqare. From round 11 to 17, he scored tries in seven consecutive games, although the streak came to an end against Leigh when his two scores were controversially overturned by the video referee. The following week, he recorded two tries and averaged over 11 metres per carry in Castleford's comeback victory against Leeds and was named in the Team of the Week.

== Representative career ==
Qareqare represented Yorkshire in their Academy Origin victory against Lancashire on 4 August 2021. He played as a winger and scored the opening try of the game in the second minute. He was named in the Yorkshire squad for the first match of the 2022 Academy Origin series, but did not take part due to Super League commitments.

In May 2022, Qareqare was named in Fiji's initial 50-man squad in the build up towards the 2021 Rugby League World Cup. In September 2022, he was included in the extended 33-man training squad. On 7 October 2022, Qareqare played on the wing for Fiji against England in their warm-up game at the AJ Bell Stadium, although missed out on a final selection in Fiji's 24-man tournament squad.

On 6 October 2023, Qareqare was named in Fiji's 20-man squad for the 2023 Pacific Championships. He started in the second match on 29 October, scoring a try in Fiji's 43–16 win over Papua New Guinea. He featured in the Pacific Bowl final on 5 November where Fiji lost 12–32 against Papua New Guinea.

== Statistics ==
Appearances and points in all competitions by year
Club	Season	Tier	App	T	G	DG	Pts
Castleford Tigers	2021	Super League	3	1	0	0	4
Castleford Tigers	2022	Super League	8	7	0	0	28
Castleford Tigers	2023	Super League	10	6	0	0	24
Castleford Tigers	2024	Super League	17	6	0	0	24
Castleford Tigers	2025	Super League	1	2	0	0	8
Castleford Tigers	2026	Super League	22	19	0	0	76
Castleford Tigers	Total		61	41	0	0	164
→ Midlands Hurricanes (DR)	2023	League 1	2	0	0	0	0
→ Bradford Bulls (loan)	2023	Championship	2	0	0	0	0
Career total			65	41	0	0	164

As of match played 24 July 2026
