= Jacques O'Neill =

English professional rugby league footballer

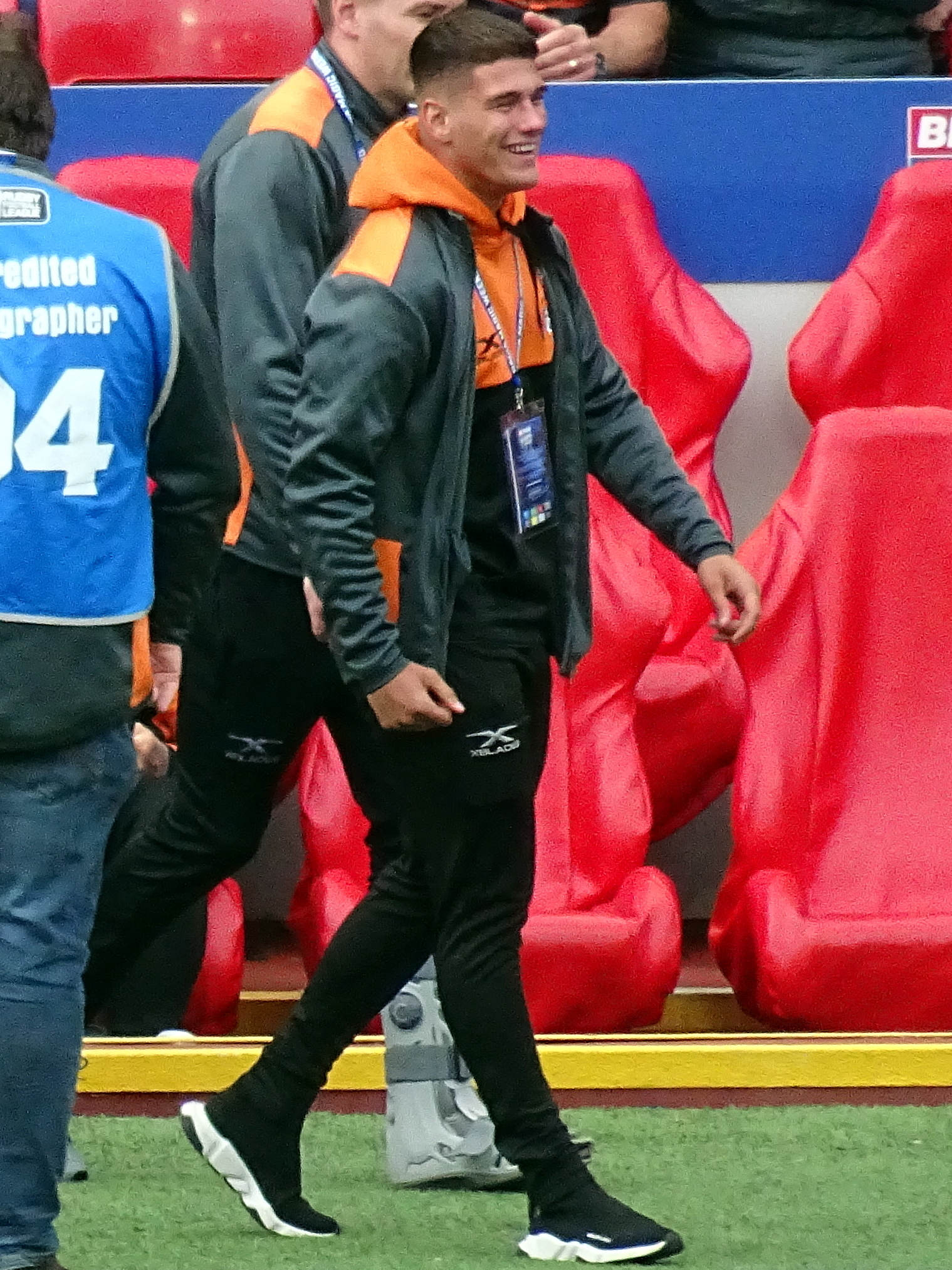

Personal information
- Full name: Jacques O'Neill
- Born: 8 May 1999 (age 27) Barrow-in-Furness, Cumbria, England
- Height: 5 ft 11 in (1.80 m)
- Weight: 14 st 2 lb (90 kg)

Playing information
- Position: Hooker, Loose forward
Club
Years	Team	Pld	T	G	FG	P
2019–22	Castleford Tigers	29	3	0	0	12
2018(loan)	→ Leigh Centurions	1	0	0	0	0
2019(DR)	→ Halifax	1	0	0	0	0
2023	Castleford Tigers	0	0	0	0	0
2023(loan)	→ Sheffield Eagles	0	0	0	0	0
2025	York Knights	3	0	0	0	0
	Total	34	3	0	0	12
- Source: As of 2 June 2026

Jacques O'Neill (born 8 May 1999) is an English former professional rugby league footballer who last played as a hooker or loose forward for the York Knights in the RFL Championship.

He has previously played for the Castleford Tigers in the Super League. He has spent time on loan and dual registration at the Leigh Centurions, Halifax, and the Sheffield Eagles in the Championship.

In 2022, he was a contestant on the eighth series of Love Island.

== Early life ==
O'Neill was born in Barrow-in-Furness, Cumbria, England.

He played junior rugby league for Askam ARLFC before being signed to the Castleford Tigers academy. After earning his academy contract, he was driven from Cumbria to Castleford twice a week for training by his mother. He currently lives in Leeds.

== Club career ==
=== Castleford Tigers ===
In August 2015, at the age of 16, O'Neill signed his first professional contract with the Castleford Tigers after progressing through the club's academy. The contract spanned two-and-a-half years and would see him step up into the Tigers' under-19s.

==== Leigh Centurions (loan) ====
In 2018, O'Neill joined the Leigh Centurions on a short-term loan to play in the Championship Shield Final. He was drafted in alongside 6 other academy players from Wigan and St Helens after the club revealed they would not have enough fit players to fulfil the fixture.

==== Halifax (dual registration) ====
In 2019, O'Neill played one game for Halifax in the Championship through their dual registration arrangement with Castleford.

==== Breakthrough ====
On 1 March 2019, O'Neill made his Super League début for Castleford against Hull Kingston Rovers. In August, he signed a new one-year deal with the Tigers. He scored his first try on 10 August against the London Broncos, and finished his breakthrough season with 11 appearances.

O'Neill signed a further one-year contract extension with Castleford in September 2020; head coach Daryl Powell said of him, "Attitude wise he is spot on. He gets after things. He needs to stay focused and I'm sure he will, and he will end up being an outstanding rugby league player." O'Neill made 12 appearances and scored 2 tries throughout the 2020 season, and was voted as the League Express Young Player of the Year.

In June 2021, O'Neill signed a new two-year deal with Castleford, stating, "I've been at Cas since I was 15/16 and it has a place in my heart now, I wasn't really looking to go anywhere else." A persistent hamstring injury severely disrupted his season, limiting him to just 6 appearances and forcing him to miss the 2021 Challenge Cup final. He underwent a hamstring re-attachment operation after his campaign was cut short, and began a steady rehabilitation process.

On 10 June 2022, Castleford announced that O'Neill had been released from his contract "to allow him to pursue another opportunity" of appearing on the ITV reality show Love Island. The Tigers had the first option to sign O'Neill back if he decided to return to rugby league in the next year. On 13 July, immediately following O'Neill's exit from the show, he visited a training session at the club, although regarding a return head coach Lee Radford said, "It is something we've not spoken about. That is probably a conversation to have further down the line I think."

=== Return to Castleford Tigers ===
On 20 April 2023, it was announced that O'Neill had rejoined the Castleford Tigers on an initial contract until the end of the 2023 season. Given his 18-month long absence from the sport and his previous hamstring issue, head physiotherapist Matt Crowther "worked closely with him to try and get him more mobile" and "durable" again. A sore Achilles meant this took longer than anticipated, so a loan move was utilised to build up match fitness.

==== Sheffield Eagles (loan) ====
In August 2023, O'Neill joined the Sheffield Eagles in the Championship on an initial two-week loan deal, continuing on a rolling basis. However, early into this move, he suffered a further setback with his Achilles injury, and was unable to make an appearance for the Eagles.

==== Departure ====
In October 2023, following the conclusion of his half-year deal, O'Neill was not included in Castleford's listed squad for the 2024 season. New head coach Craig Lingard later clarified, "Jacques O'Neill is not at the club, his contract hasn't been renewed and he has naturally left the club as people do at the end of their contracts."

One year later, reflecting on his previous attempted return to rugby league, O'Neill said, "I was in a really bad place mentally and physically the worst shape of my life. I came back and expected to be the old Jacques who was playing Super League and it was just not the right timing."

=== York Knights ===
On 14 November 2024, it was announced that O'Neill had signed for York Knights in the RFL Championship on a one-year deal. In June 2025, O'Neill sustained an ankle injury that ruled him out for the remainder of the season. He did not retain his place in the squad for the 2026 season.

== International career ==
O'Neill represented England Under-16s in their international series against France Under-16s in April 2015. He played as a hooker in both the 16–6 victory at Belle Vue on 3 April, scoring a try and receiving a Man of the Match award, and the 20–8 defeat at Post Office Road on 7 April.

In April 2021, O'Neill was selected in the England Knights performance squad.

== Personal life ==
He was diagnosed with ADHD at age 9.

In 2022, O'Neill became a contestant on the eighth series of Love Island. He decided to leave the villa on Day 37 for mental health purposes and to "get back to himself". Castleford Tigers offered O'Neill welfare support and spoke of the club's focus to support and welcome him at Wheldon Road.

== Statistics ==
Appearances and points in all competitions by year
Club	Season	Tier	App	T	G	DG	Pts
Castleford Tigers	2019	Super League	11	1	0	0	4
Castleford Tigers	2020	Super League	12	2	0	0	8
Castleford Tigers	2021	Super League	6	0	0	0	0
Castleford Tigers	2022	Super League	0	0	0	0	0
Castleford Tigers	2023	Super League	0	0	0	0	0
Castleford Tigers	Total		29	3	0	0	12
→ Leigh Centurions (loan)	2018	Championship	1	0	0	0	0
→ Halifax (DR)	2019	Championship	1	0	0	0	0
→ Sheffield Eagles (loan)	2023	Championship	0	0	0	0	0
York Knights	2025	Championship	3	0	0	0	0
Career total			34	3	0	0	12

As of June 2026
