= Aaron Willis =

English rugby league footballer

Personal information
- Full name: Aaron Willis
- Born: 11 December 2003 (age 22) Macclesfield, Cheshire, England
- Height: 6 ft 0 in (1.83 m)
- Weight: 15 st 4 lb (97 kg)

Playing information
- Position: Prop, Second-row
Club
Years	Team	Pld	T	G	FG	P
2023	Castleford Tigers	1	0	0	0	0
2023(DR)	→ Midlands Hurricanes	14	2	0	0	8
2024–25	Midlands Hurricanes	40	6	0	0	24
2026–	Swinton Lions	17	1	0	0	4
	Total	72	9	0	0	36
- Source: As of 19 July 2026

Aaron Willis (born 11 December 2003) is an English professional rugby league footballer who plays as a prop or second-row forward for the Swinton Lions in the RFL Championship.

He has previously played for Castleford Tigers in the Super League and for Midlands Hurricanes in League One.

== Background ==
Willis was born in Macclesfield, Cheshire, England.

Willis played junior rugby league for South Trafford Raiders and Langworthy Reds ARLFC. He joined the Castleford Tigers Academy system after his previous side, the Widnes Vikings, closed their academy.

Willis' performances for Castleford's Academy and Reserves sides saw him named Academy Player of the Year for 2022. He joined the senior squad for 2023 pre-season training and played in a friendly against Featherstone Rovers on New Year's Eve.

== Playing career ==
=== Castleford Tigers ===
On 9 June 2023, Willis made his Super League debut for the Castleford Tigers against the Salford Red Devils. He was originally intended to be 18th man, but was informed he would play on the day of the game due to additional injuries. Head coach Andy Last said, "Aaron did a good job after coming on and to give him the last 20 minutes of the game will do him the world of good."

On 22 October 2023, following the conclusion of the season, Castleford confirmed that Willis had departed the club to "take up an opportunity elsewhere".

==== Midlands Hurricanes (dual registration) ====
Willis played for the Midlands Hurricanes in 2023, through their dual registration arrangement with Castleford. He went on to make 14 appearances across the 2023 season, winning the club's Young Player of the Year award.

=== Midlands Hurricanes ===
On 7 November 2023, Willis made his move to Midlands Hurricanes permanent, joining the League One club on a two-year deal.

He was named the club's Young Player of the Year for a second time in the 2025 season.

=== Swinton Lions ===
On 10 September 2025, Swinton Lions announced the signing of Willis from 2026. He scored his first try for the club against Keighley Cougars on 28 June 2026. Willis failed a head injury assessment against Doncaster on 19 July and made no further appearances in 2026.

== Club statistics ==
Appearances and points in all competitions by year
Club	Season	Tier	App	T	G	DG	Pts
Castleford Tigers	2023	Super League	1	0	0	0	0
Midlands Hurricanes	2023 (Note: On dual registration from Castleford in 2023 before joining permanently in 2024)	League One	14	2	0	0	8
Midlands Hurricanes	2024	League One	21	2	0	0	8
Midlands Hurricanes	2025	League One	19	4	0	0	16
Midlands Hurricanes	Total		54	8	0	0	32
Swinton Lions	2026	Championship	17	1	0	0	4
Career total			72	9	0	0	36

As of match played 19 July 2026
