= Jack Broadbent (rugby league) =

English professional rugby league footballer

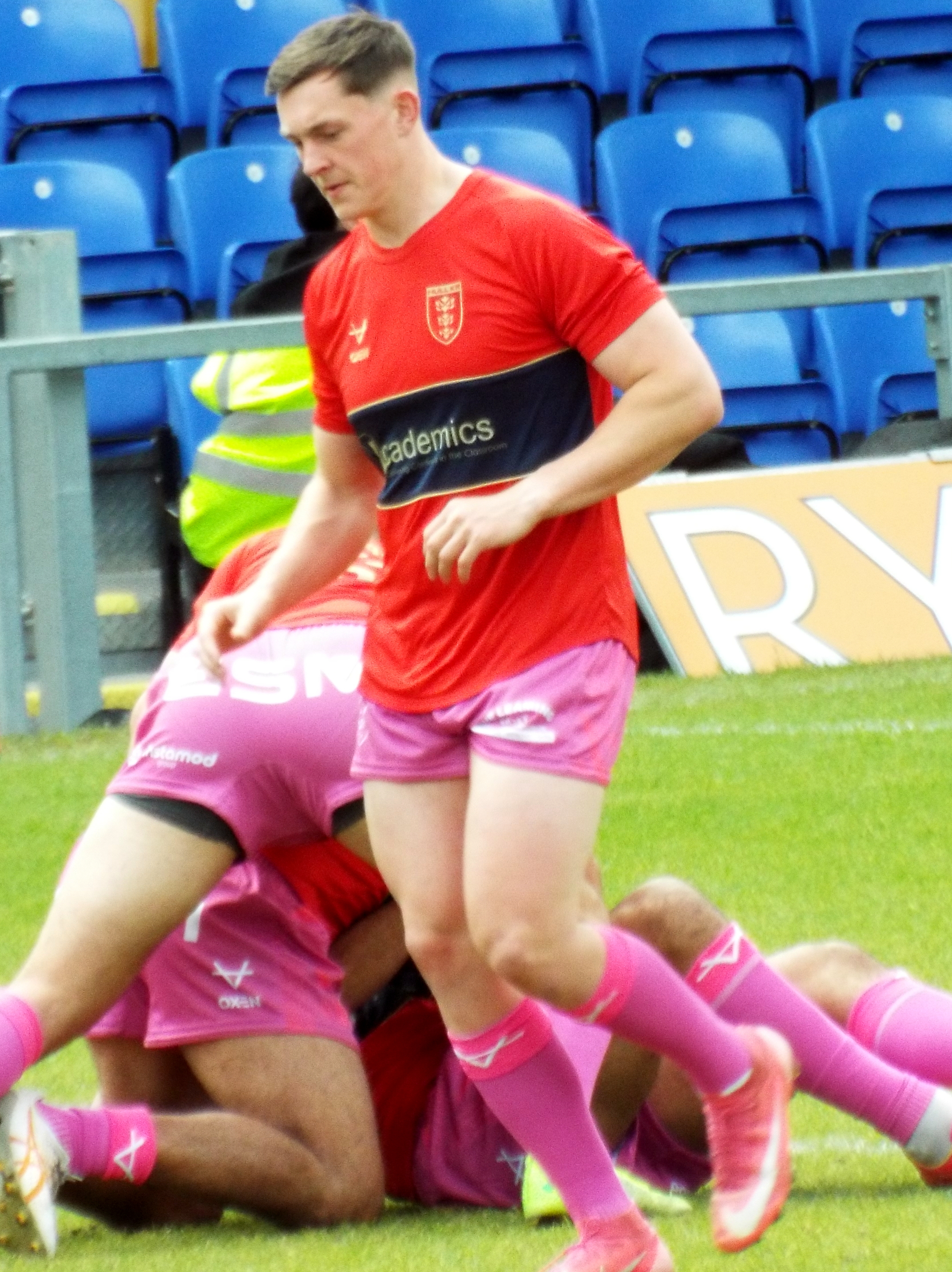

Personal information
- Full name: Jack Broadbent
- Born: 1 November 2000 (age 25) Batley, West Yorkshire, England
- Height: 5 ft 11 in (1.80 m)
- Weight: 14 st 9 lb (93 kg)

Playing information
- Position: Centre, Stand-off, Fullback, Wing
Club
Years	Team	Pld	T	G	FG	P
2019–22	Leeds Rhinos	22	9	0	0	36
2019(loan)	→ Featherstone Rovers	3	2	0	0	8
2019(loan)	→ Batley Bulldogs	11	3	0	0	12
2022(loan)	→ Featherstone Rovers	12	8	0	0	32
2023–24	Castleford Tigers	36	7	0	0	28
2024–	Hull Kingston Rovers	76	38	0	0	152
	Total	160	67	0	0	268
Representative
Years	Team	Pld	T	G	FG	P
2021	England Knights	1	2	0	0	8
- Source: As of 19 September 2026

Jack Broadbent (born 1 November 2000) is an English professional rugby league footballer who plays as a centre, stand-off, fullback or winger for Hull Kingston Rovers in the Super League.

He has previously played for the Leeds Rhinos and the Castleford Tigers in the Super League. He has spent time on loan from Leeds at Featherstone Rovers and the Batley Bulldogs in the RFL Championship.

== Background ==
Broadbent attended Bruntcliffe Academy in Morley, West Yorkshire.

Broadbent played his amateur rugby league with Dewsbury Moor and Batley Boys.

== Career ==
=== Leeds Rhinos ===
Broadbent made his Super League debut in round 14 of the 2020 Super League season for Leeds against the Catalans Dragons.

In round 11 of the 2021 Super League season, he scored two tries for Leeds in a 38–12 victory over Salford. The following week, he scored four tries in a 48–18 victory over Leigh.

=== Castleford Tigers ===
On 2 December 2022, Castleford Tigers announced the signing of Broadbent on a two-year deal. He made his Castleford debut in round 1 against Hull FC, and scored his first try in round 2 against St Helens. He enjoyed a strong individual campaign in a disappointing season and said, "I've got everything I wanted. I'm getting game time in Super League and feel like I'm fulfilling my potential and have the chance to showcase that." He made 26 appearances and scored 6 tries in total in the 2023 season, featuring predominately as a centre or stand-off as well as filling in as a fullback, hooker, or winger.

==== Hull Kingston Rovers ====
On 23 April 2024, it was announced that Broadbent had signed for Hull Kingston Rovers on a season-long loan for the remainder of 2024, prior to a permanent three-year deal next (2025) season. On 12 October 2024, Broadbent played in Hull Kingston Rovers 2024 Super League Grand Final loss against Wigan. On 7 June 2025, Broadbent played in Hull Kingston Rovers 8–6 2025 Challenge Cup final victory over Warrington. It was the clubs first major trophy in 40 years. On 18 September Hull Kingston Rovers won the League Leaders Shield on the final game of the season were Broadbent started on the bench in victory over Warrington, Broadbent played a crucial part in Hull Kingston Rovers 1st place season in covering for the injured star centre Oliver Gildart.

== Club statistics ==
Appearances and points in all competitions by year
Club	Season	Tier	App	T	G	DG	Pts
Leeds Rhinos	2020	Super League	3	0	0	0	0
Leeds Rhinos	2021	Super League	14	9	0	0	36
Leeds Rhinos	2022	Super League	5	0	0	0	0
Leeds Rhinos	Total		22	9	0	0	36
→ Featherstone Rovers (loan)	2019	Championship	3	2	0	0	8
→ Featherstone Rovers (loan)	2022	Championship	12	8	0	0	32
→ Featherstone Rovers (loan)	Total		15	10	0	0	40
→ Batley Bulldogs (loan)	2019	Championship	11	3	0	0	12
Castleford Tigers	2023	Super League	26	6	0	0	24
Castleford Tigers	2024	Super League	10	1	0	0	4
Castleford Tigers	Total		36	7	0	0	28
Hull Kingston Rovers	2024 (Note: On loan from Castleford in 2024 before joining permanently in 2025)	Super League	14	7	0	0	28
Career total			98	36	0	0	144

As of match played 12 October 2024
