= Brad Martin (rugby league) =

English rugby league footballer (born 2001)

Personal information
- Full name: Bradley Martin
- Born: 6 February 2001 (age 25) Pontefract, West Yorkshire, England
- Height: 6 ft 2 in (1.88 m)
- Weight: 14 st 13 lb (95 kg)

Playing information
- Position: Prop, Second-row
Club
| Years | Team | Pld | T | G | FG | P |
|---|---|---|---|---|---|---|
| 2020–24 | Castleford Tigers | 40 | 2 | 0 | 0 | 8 |
| 2022(DR) | → Midlands Hurricanes | 2 | 0 | 0 | 0 | 0 |
| 2023(DR) | → Midlands Hurricanes | 3 | 2 | 0 | 0 | 8 |
| 2025– | Leigh Leopards | 0 | 0 | 0 | 0 | 0 |
| 2025(loan) | → Batley Bulldogs | 2 | 3 | 0 | 0 | 12 |
| 2025(loan) | → Sheffield Eagles | 1 | 0 | 0 | 0 | 0 |
| | Total | 48 | 7 | 0 | 0 | 28 |
- Source: As of 18 April 2025

Brad Martin (born 6 February 2001) is an English professional rugby league footballer who plays as a prop or second-row forward for Leigh Leopards in the Super League.

He has previously played for Castleford Tigers in the Super League. He has spent time on loan or dual registration at Batley Bulldogs and Sheffield Eagles in the RFL Championship, and at Midlands Hurricanes in RFL League 1.

== Background ==
Martin was born in Pontefract, West Yorkshire, England.

Martin attended Outwood Grange Academy, Wakefield between 2012 and 2017. Martin was also in the same year as Turkey international rugby league footballer Yusuf Aydin.

Martin played junior rugby league for Dewsbury Moor ARLFC. He was in the Leeds Rhinos academy ranks for four years before joining the Castleford Tigers academy ahead of the 2020 season, seeking first team opportunities.

== Career ==
=== Castleford Tigers ===
On 22 October 2020, Martin made his Super League début for the Castleford Tigers against Hull Kingston Rovers.

In January 2021, Martin was promoted to Castleford's first team and signed a one-year contract extension. He scored his first try for the Tigers against the Salford Red Devils on 11 July. He made 9 appearances throughout the season and signed a new one-year deal with Castleford in October.

In his first appearance of 2022, Martin received a late red card for a high tackle on Wigan's Willie Isa. He went on to feature in 11 games in total. In September, Martin signed a new two-year contract with Castleford, extending his stay until the end of 2024. He said, "I'm really settled and really enjoying it. The main thing for next season is to get the game time and show the coach what I can do."

On 5 April 2024, Martin scored his second try for Castleford against the Salford Red Devils.

==== Midlands Hurricanes (dual registration) ====
Martin made two appearances for the Midlands Hurricanes in League 1 during the 2022 season, through their dual registration agreement with Castleford. He returned to the club in the following year, making three appearances and scoring two tries for the Hurricanes in 2023.

=== Leigh Leopards ===
On 15 Oct 2024 it was reported that he had signed for Leigh Leopards in the Super League on a 2-year deal.

==== Batley Bulldogs (loan) ====
On 6 Mar 2025 it was reported that he had signed for Batley Bulldogs in the RFL Championship on one-month loan

==== Sheffield Eagles (loan) ====
On 16 Apr 2025 it was reported that he had signed for Sheffield Eagles in the RFL Championship on season-long loan

== Statistics ==
Appearances and points in all competitions by year
| Club | Season | Tier | App | T | G | DG | Pts |
|---|---|---|---|---|---|---|---|
| Castleford Tigers | 2020 | Super League | 1 | 0 | 0 | 0 | 0 |
| Castleford Tigers | 2021 | Super League | 9 | 1 | 0 | 0 | 4 |
| Castleford Tigers | 2022 | Super League | 11 | 0 | 0 | 0 | 0 |
| Castleford Tigers | 2023 | Super League | 9 | 0 | 0 | 0 | 0 |
| Castleford Tigers | 2024 | Super League | 10 | 1 | 0 | 0 | 4 |
| Castleford Tigers | Total | | 40 | 2 | 0 | 0 | 8 |
| → Midlands Hurricanes (DR) | 2022 | League 1 | 2 | 0 | 0 | 0 | 0 |
| → Midlands Hurricanes (DR) | 2023 | League 1 | 3 | 2 | 0 | 0 | 8 |
| → Midlands Hurricanes (DR) | Total | | 5 | 2 | 0 | 0 | 8 |
| Leigh Leopards | 2026 | Super League | 0 | 0 | 0 | 0 | 0 |
| → Batley Bulldogs (loan) | 2025 | Championship | 2 | 3 | 0 | 0 | 8 |
| → Sheffield Eagles (loan) | 2025 | Championship | 1 | 0 | 0 | 0 | 0 |
| Career total | | | 48 | 7 | 0 | 0 | 28 |

As of match played 18 April 2025
