= Billy Tsikrikas =

Greece international rugby league player

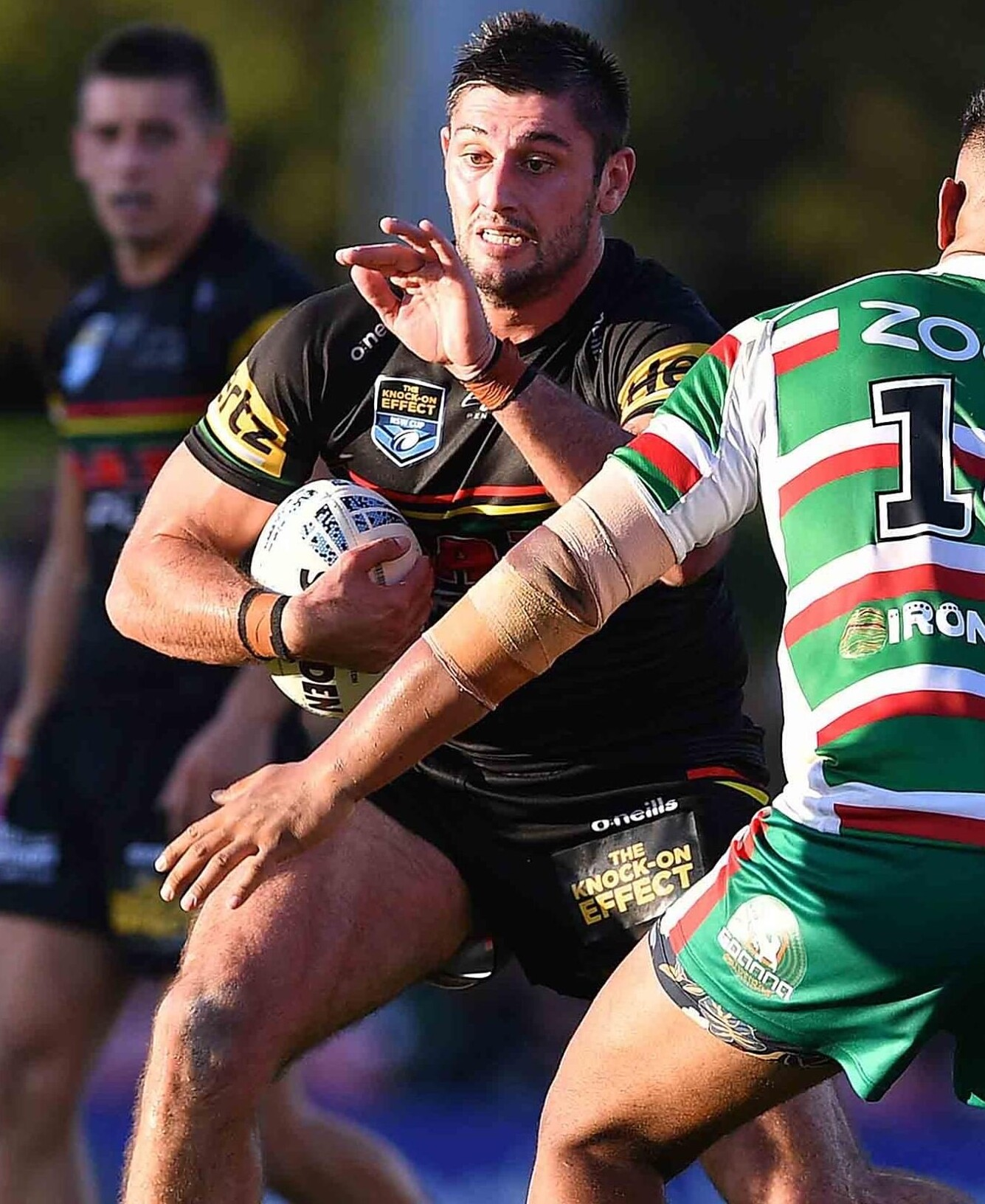

Personal information
- Full name: Vasili Tsikrikas
- Born: 11 May 1995 (age 31) Sydney, New South Wales, Australia
- Height: 194 cm (6 ft 4 in)
- Weight: 109 kg (17 st 2 lb)

Playing information
- Position: Prop, Second-row
Club
Years	Team	Pld	T	G	FG	P
2022–23	Canterbury Bulldogs	2	0	0	0	0
2023(loan)	→ Castleford Tigers	4	0	0	0	0
	Total	6	0	0	0	0
Representative
Years	Team	Pld	T	G	FG	P
2014–	Greece	8	4	0	0	16
- Source: As of 21 July 2023

Billy Tsikrikas (born 11 May 1995) is a Greece international rugby league footballer who plays as prop for the South Sydney Rabbitohs in the NRL.

== Background ==
Tsikrikas was born in Sydney, Australia, lived near the Bexley North area, and is of Greek descent.

== Playing career ==
=== Early career ===
Tsikrikas played the majority of his junior football at St Marys Saints in the Ron Massey Cup until 2019 when he was signed to a development contract by the Penrith Panthers. He represented the Greece national rugby league team on six occasions scoring four tries.

=== 2019 ===
Tsikrikas featured in the Penrith Panthers NSW Cup squad after earning a reserve grade contract, playing four games and scoring one try.

=== 2021 ===
In 2021, Tsikrikas had a breakout season with the Penrith reserve grade team featuring in 13 games and scoring two tries.

=== 2022 ===
Freshly appointed Canterbury-Bankstown Bulldogs general manager Phil Gould, having initially recruiting Tsikrikas to the Penrith Panthers handed him a train-and-trial contract. This was a conditional contract where players earn $1000 a week before being promoted to a Top 30 or development contract. Tsikrikas began the season with the Canterbury NSW Cup team featuring in six games and scoring one try continuing his impressive form from Penrith. A crisis struck the Canterbury football club as four players tested positive to COVID-19 As three more were injured, Phil Gould applied to the NRL for special exemption to allow Tsikrikas to replace his teammate Ava Seumanafagai on the bench for their round 7 match against the Brisbane Broncos on 22 April 2022 at Suncorp Stadium. Tsikrikas, working as a teacher at Endeavour Sports High School, received the call up that he had long waited for throughout his career. Tsikrikas was retained for the clash against the Sydney Roosters, in which he played a hand in the 16–12 win. Coming up with 30 tackles and 75 run metres including two tackle breaks from 29 minutes.

=== 2023 ===
Tsikrikas was able to re-sign with Canterbury for the 2023 NRL season. Tsikrikas left Canterbury on a year long loan to the Castleford Tigers in the Super league. He made his debut via the interchange against Hull Kingston Rovers. On 30 November, Tsikrikas signed a contract to join South Sydney.

=== 2024 ===
He played 15 games scoring 3 tries for the South Sydney Rabbitohs in the NSW Cup trying to re establish himself in hopes for a recall to the top grade.
