= Albert Vete =

Tonga international rugby league footballer

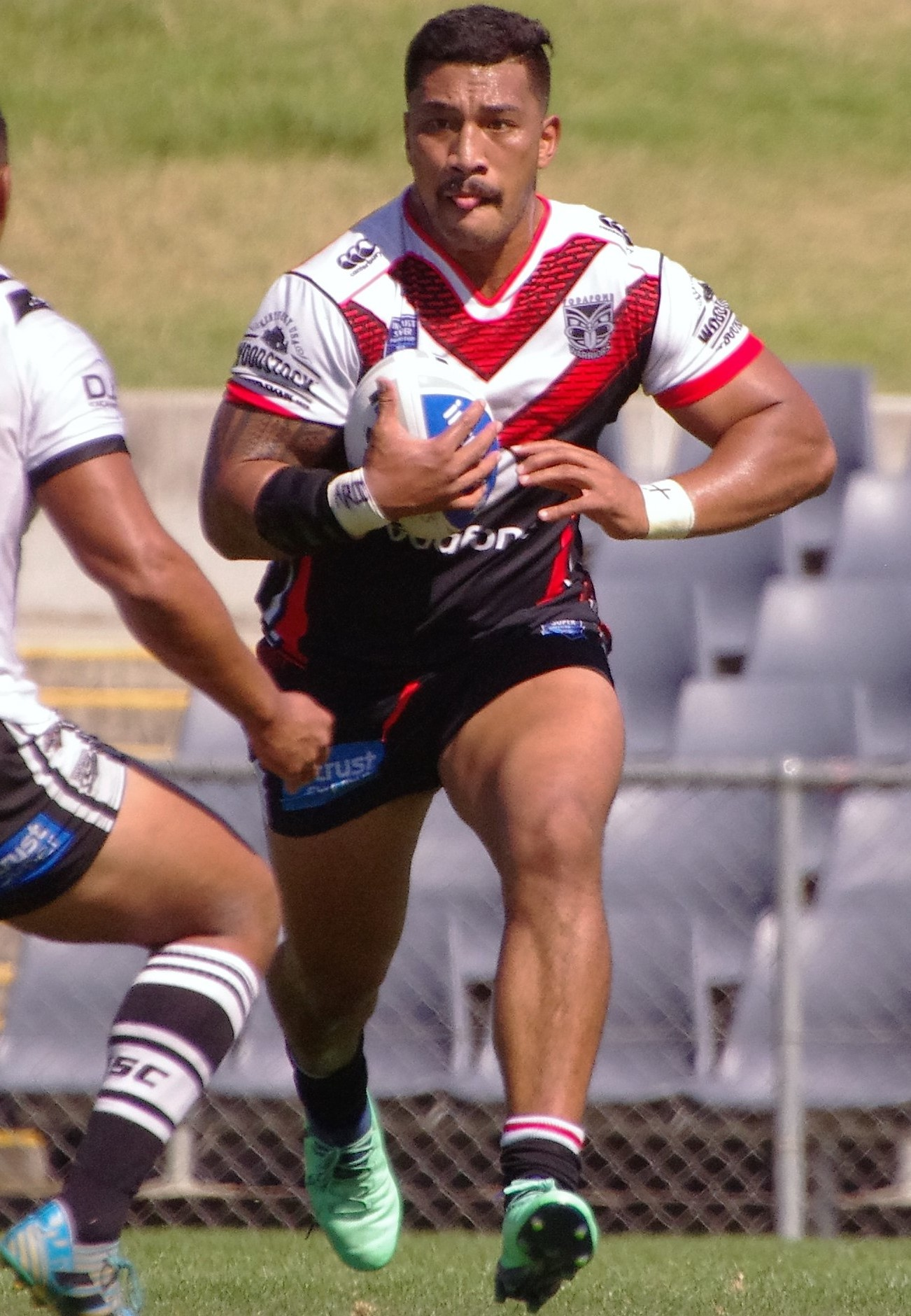

Personal information
- Born: 24 January 1993 (age 33) Auckland, New Zealand
- Height: 6 ft 3 in (1.90 m)
- Weight: 17 st 13 lb (114 kg)

Playing information
- Position: Prop
Club
Years	Team	Pld	T	G	FG	P
2015–18	New Zealand Warriors	46	4	0	0	16
2018–20	Melbourne Storm	8	0	0	0	0
2021–22	Hull Kingston Rovers	32	8	0	0	32
2023–24	Castleford Tigers	11	0	0	0	0
2023(loan)	→ Featherstone Rovers	2	0	0	0	0
2023(loan)	→ Doncaster RLFC	8	4	0	0	16
2024	Point Chevalier Pirates	1	1	0	0	4
2025–2026	Otahuhu Leopards	10	5	0	0	20
	Total	118	22	0	0	88
Representative
Years	Team	Pld	T	G	FG	P
2015	Tonga	2	0	0	0	0
- Source: As of 19 April 2024

Albert Vete (Tongan: ʻAlipate Vete) (born 24 January 1993) is a Tonga international rugby league footballer who last played as a prop forward for the Castleford Tigers in the Super League.

He previously played for the New Zealand Warriors and the Melbourne Storm in the National Rugby League, and Hull Kingston Rovers in the Super League. He has also spent time on loan from Castleford at Featherstone Rovers in the Championship and Doncaster in League 1.

== Background ==
Vete was born in Auckland, New Zealand. He is of Tongan descent.

Vete was educated at Saint Kentigern College, playing rugby union and captaining their first XV to the Auckland title.

== Playing career ==
=== Early years ===
Vete switched to rugby league in 2012, signing with the New Zealand Warriors and playing in their under 20's side while studying towards a Bachelor of Physical Education. Vete was part of the Junior Warriors side that played in 2013 Holden Cup Grand Final against the Penrith Panthers juniors, playing at prop and scoring a try in the 30–42 loss.

On 13 October 2013, Vete played for the Junior Kiwis against the Junior Kangaroos at prop in the Kiwis' 26–38 loss. In 2014 Vete joined the full-time squad and played in 19 games in the New South Wales Cup for the Warriors.

=== 2015 ===
In Round 1 of the 2015 NRL season, Vete made his first grade NRL debut for the New Zealand Warriors against the Newcastle Knights off the interchange bench in the Warriors 24–14 loss at Hunter Stadium. On 2 May 2015, Vete played for Tonga against Samoa in the Polynesian Cup, playing off the interchange bench in Tonga's 16–18 loss at Cbus Super Stadium. On 7 July 2015, Vete re-signed with the Warriors on a 2-year contract to the end of the 2017 season. In Round 20 against the Manly-Warringah Sea Eagles, Vete scored his first NRL career try in the Warriors 32–12 loss at Mt Smart Stadium. Vete finished his debut year in the NRL with him playing in 21 matches and scoring 2 tries. On 17 October 2015, Vete played for Tonga in their Asia-Pacific Qualifier match against the Cook Islands for the 2017 Rugby League World Cup. He played at prop in Tonga's 28–8 win at Campbelltown Stadium.

=== 2016 ===
In February, Vete played for the Warriors in the 2016 NRL Auckland Nines.

On 2 May, The New Zealand Herald reported five players were stood down from an international test match for mixing prescription drugs with energy drinks on a night out. The recipe can emulate the effect of illicit drugs. Vete was one of the players named who was involved in the activity.

=== 2018 ===
In July, Vete was a mid season trade from the Warriors. He made his Melbourne Storm debut against St. George Illawarra in their round 17 clash.

=== 2019 ===
In the 2019 NRL season, Vete made only one appearance which came against St. George Illawarra in round 16 where Melbourne won 16–14.

=== 2020 ===
Vete made only six appearances for Melbourne in the 2020 NRL season. He did not play in the finals series or the 2020 NRL Grand Final for Melbourne. At the end of the season, he signed a contract to join Hull KR.

=== 2021 ===
In round 18 of the 2021 Super League season, Vete was controversially sent to the sin bin during Hull KR's 34–28 victory over Leigh. In the elimination play off match against Warrington, Vete was sent to the sin bin during Hull KR's 19–0 victory. Vete made a total of 13 appearances including the club's semi-final defeat against the Catalans Dragons.

=== 2022 ===
On 29 August, it was announced that Vete would be one of eleven players who were to depart Hull Kingston Rovers at the end of the 2022 season. On 24 September, it was announced that he had signed a two-year deal to join Castleford.

=== 2023 ===
On 5 April 2023 it was reported that he would join Featherstone Rovers on a short-term loan deal.

=== 2024 ===
On 19 Apr 24 Castleford Tigers confirmed that Vete had been released by the club, due to niggling injuries.
