= Cain Robb =

English rugby league footballer (born 2003)

Personal information
- Full name: Cain Robb
- Born: 5 January 2003 (age 23) Leeds, West Yorkshire, England
- Height: 5 ft 9 in (1.75 m)
- Weight: 12 st 13 lb (82 kg)

Playing information
- Position: Hooker
Club
Years	Team	Pld	T	G	FG	P
2021–26	Castleford Tigers	45	0	0	0	0
2022(loan)	→ Whitehaven RLFC	7	0	0	0	0
2023(loan)	→ Swinton Lions	3	0	0	0	0
2025(loan)	→ Salford Red Devils	2	0	0	0	0
2026(loan)	→ Batley Bulldogs	3	0	0	0	0
2027–	Newcastle Thunder	0	0	0	0	0
	Total	60	0	0	0	0
- Source: As of 21 November 2026

Cain Robb (born 5 January 2003) is an English professional rugby league footballer who plays as a hooker for Newcastle Thunder in the RFL Championship.

He has spent time on loan at Salford Red Devils in the Super League, and at Whitehaven, Swinton Lions and Batley Bulldogs in the RFL Championship.

== Background ==
Robb was born in Leeds, West Yorkshire, England.

Robb played junior rugby league for West Hull ARLFC and Beverley Braves. He joined the Castleford Tigers development system at scholarship level.

== Playing career ==
=== Castleford Tigers ===
Robb made his Super League debut for Castleford on 11 July 2021 against the Salford Red Devils. He was one of five debutants, with senior players rested ahead of the Challenge Cup final, and was voted Fans' Man of the Match for his performance. In his second senior appearance three weeks later, he was once again named Fans' Man of the Match.

Ahead of the 2024 season, pundit and former Tigers director of rugby Jon Wells predicted Robb to be a rising star in Super League and likened his playing style to that of Daryl Clark. On 21 May, he signed a two-year contract extension with Castleford. In June, he was voted Man of the Match in consecutive weeks against Wigan and Hull KR, and head coach Craig Lingard said, "His teammates love him because of that effort and desire. He is getting smarter in his game, he has been sensational the past few weeks." Robb suffered successive shoulder and head injuries in August to cut his season short. He made 18 appearances and was noted as Castleford's standout young player.

==== Swinton Lions (loan) ====
On 3 August 2023, Robb joined Swinton Lions in the RFL Championship on loan until the end of the 2023 season. Having played three games, Robb was recalled to Castleford on 4 September.

==== Salford Red Devils (loan) ====
On 20 June 2025, Robb made a two-week loan move to Salford Red Devils in the Super League. After a failed HIA suffered on debut ruled him out of the following match, his loan was extended by one further week before he returned to Castleford.

==== Batley Bulldogs (loan) ====
On 31 March 2026, Robb joined the Batley Bulldogs in the Championship on a one-month loan deal, marking his return from knee injury. He made three appearances for Batley before his recall to Castleford on 28 April.

=== Newcastle Thunder ===
On 20 November 2026 it was reported that he had signed for Newcastle Thunder in the RFL Championship

== Statistics ==
Appearances and points in all competitions by year
Club	Season	Tier	App	T	G	DG	Pts
Castleford Tigers	2021	Super League	2	0	0	0	0
Castleford Tigers	2022	Super League	4	0	0	0	0
Castleford Tigers	2023	Super League	8	0	0	0	0
Castleford Tigers	2024	Super League	18	0	0	0	0
Castleford Tigers	2025	Super League	13	0	0	0	0
Castleford Tigers	2026	Super League	0	0	0	0	0
Castleford Tigers	Total		45	0	0	0	0
→ Whitehaven (loan)	2022	Championship	7	0	0	0	0
→ Swinton Lions (loan)	2023	Championship	3	0	0	0	0
→ Salford Red Devils (loan)	2025	Super League	2	0	0	0	0
→ Batley Bulldogs (loan)	2026	Championship	3	0	0	0	0
Career total			60	0	0	0	0

As of match played 19 April 2026
