= Jacob Hookem =

English rugby league footballer

Personal information
- Full name: Jacob Hookem
- Born: 4 October 2002 (age 23) Hull, East Riding of Yorkshire, England
- Height: 5 ft 11 in (1.8 m)
- Weight: 14 st 2 lb (90 kg)

Playing information
- Position: Hooker, Scrum-half, Stand-off
Club
Years	Team	Pld	T	G	FG	P
2021–22	Hull F.C.	5	0	0	0	0
2022(loan)	→ Whitehaven R.L.F.C.	6	0	0	0	0
2022(loan)	→ Bradford Bulls	4	0	0	0	0
2023	Castleford Tigers	1	0	0	0	0
2023(DR)	→ Midlands Hurricanes	8	2	17	0	42
2024–	Dewsbury Rams	8	2	0	0	0
	Total	32	4	17	0	42
- Source: As of 28 January 2024

Jacob Hookem (born 4 October 2002) is an English professional rugby league footballer who plays as a hooker, scrum-half or stand-off for the Dewsbury Rams in the RFL Championship.

He has previously played for Hull F.C. and Castleford Tigers in the Super League, and at Whitehaven, Bradford Bulls and Midlands Hurricanes.

== Career ==
=== Hull FC ===
On 13 August 2021 he made his Hull F.C. début in the Super League against the Catalans Dragons.

=== Dewsbury Rams ===
On 25 Oct 2023 it was reported that he had signed for Dewsbury Rams for 2024.
