= Jack Sadler =

English rugby league footballer

Personal information
- Full name: Jack Ethan Sadler
- Born: 28 September 2002 (age 23) York, England
- Height: 5 ft 6 in (1.68 m)
- Weight: 13 st 5 lb (85 kg)

Playing information
- Position: Stand-off, Hooker
Club
Years	Team	Pld	T	G	FG	P
2021–22	Castleford Tigers	1	0	0	0	0
2022(DR)	→ Midlands Hurricanes	1	0	0	0	0
	Total	2	0	0	0	0
- Source: As of 7 May 2022

Jack Sadler (born 28 September 2002) is an English former professional rugby league footballer who plays as a stand-off or hooker for Heworth A.R.L.F.C. in the National Conference League.

He has previously played for the Castleford Tigers in the Super League, and has spent time on dual registration with the Midlands Hurricanes in League One.

== Background ==
Sadler was born in York, England.

Sadler played junior rugby league for New Earswick All Blacks ARLFC and Heworth ARLFC.

== Career ==
=== Castleford Tigers ===
On 11 July 2021, Sadler made his Super League début for Castleford against the Salford Red Devils.

Sadler featured in Castleford’s 2022 pre-season fixture against Doncaster R.L.F.C., converting 3/3 conversions.

==== Midlands Hurricanes (dual registration) ====
On 7 May 2022, Sadler made his League 1 debut for the Midlands Hurricanes against Rochdale Hornets, on dual registration from Castleford.

=== Heworth A.R.L.F.C. ===
Sadler kicked three goals in the 2023 NCL Division One play-off final as Heworth won promotion to the Premier Division.
