= Lewis Peachey =

English rugby league footballer

Personal information
- Full name: Lewis Peachey
- Born: 25 March 2001 (age 25) Derbyshire, England
- Height: 6 ft 1 in (1.85 m)
- Weight: 15 st 8 lb (99 kg)

Playing information
- Position: Second-row, Prop, Loose forward
Club
Years	Team	Pld	T	G	FG	P
2019–22	Castleford Tigers	11	0	0	0	0
2021(loan)	→ York City Knights	2	0	0	0	0
2022(loan)	→ Newcastle Thunder	22	2	0	0	8
2023–	Sheffield Eagles	17	2	0	0	8
2023(loan)	→ Rochdale Hornets	11	2	0	0	8
2024(D/R)	→ Midlands Hurricanes	19	4	0	0	16
2025	→ Midlands Hurricanes(loan)	0	0	0	0	0
	Total	82	10	0	0	40
- Source: As of 16 July 2025

Lewis Peachey (born 25 March 2001) is an English professional rugby league footballer who plays as a second-row forward or prop for Midlands Hurricanes in the RFL League 1 on loan from Sheffield Eagles in the RFL Championship.

== Club career ==
=== Castleford Tigers ===
On 22 April 2019, Peachey made his Super League début for Castleford against the Catalans Dragons.

==== York City Knights (loan) ====
On 14 April 2021, it was reported that Peachey had signed for the York City Knights in the RFL Championship on an initial two-week loan. He made 2 appearances for the Knights before returning to Castleford.

==== Newcastle Thunder (loan) ====
On 14 December 2021, it was announced that Peachey had signed for the Newcastle Thunder in the RFL Championship on a season-long loan. He was available to be recalled by Castleford and was still included in their squad for the season, retaining the number 27 shirt.

==== Midlands Hurricanes (loan) ====
On 16 July 2025 it was reported that he had signed for Midlands Hurricanes in the RFL League 1 on loan
