= Bureta Faraimo =

United States international rugby league footballer

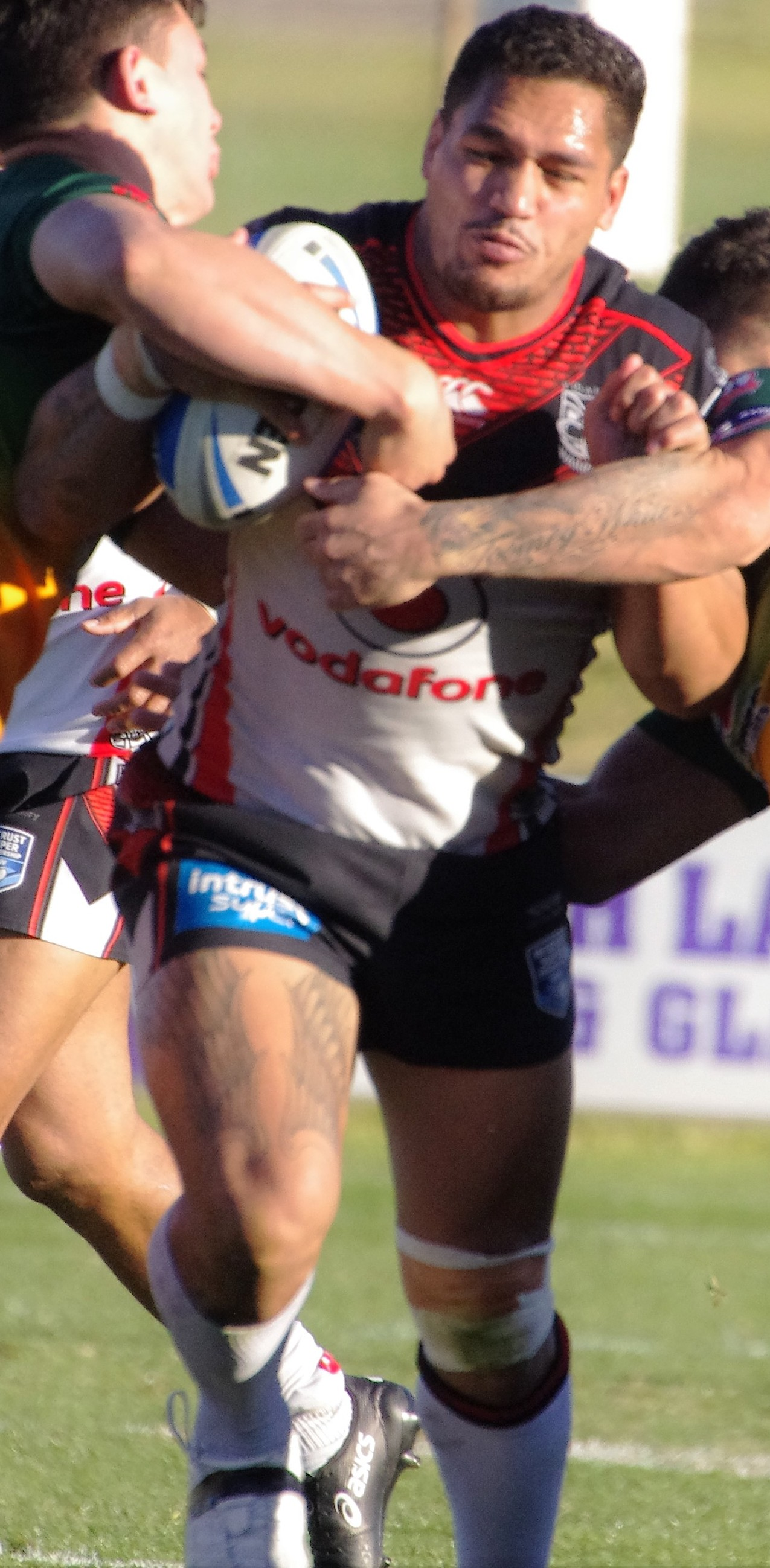

Personal information
- Born: 16 July 1990 (age 36) Wellington, New Zealand
- Height: 6 ft 0 in (1.83 m)
- Weight: 16 st 7 lb (105 kg)

Playing information

Rugby league
- Position: Wing
Club
Years	Team	Pld	T	G	FG	P
2014–16	Parramatta Eels	15	9	0	0	36
2018–21	Hull FC	87	43	4	0	180
2022–23	Castleford Tigers	35	15	0	0	60
2023–26	Doncaster	42	35	1	0	142
2026(loan)	→ Hunslet	4	5	0	0	20
	Total	183	107	5	0	438
Representative
Years	Team	Pld	T	G	FG	P
2013–26	United States	5	1	0	0	4
2016–17	NSW Residents	2	0	0	0	0
2019	United States 9s	1	1	1	0	6

Rugby union
Club
Years	Team	Pld	T	G	FG	P
2023–	Hull RUFC	38	24	0	0	120
- Source: As of 20 November 2026

Bureta Faraimo (born 16 July 1990) is a United States international rugby league and rugby union player who plays for Hull RUFC.

He has previously played for the Parramatta Eels in the NRL, and Hull F.C. in the Super League.

== Early life ==
Faraimo was born in Wellington, New Zealand, and is of Tokelaun descent (Olohega) also known as Swains Island which is a part of American Samoa.

He played his junior rugby league for St. George, New Zealand.

== Club career ==
=== New Zealand ===
In 2010, Faraimo trialed with the New Zealand Warriors Under 20s team but didn't get a contract. Later that year, while playing for the Wainuiomata Lions, Faraimo was selected to play for the Wellington Orcas in the National Competition, scoring 12 tries in his first 3 games.

=== Mackay Cutters ===
In 2011, Faraimo moved to Australia to play for the Mackay Cutters in the Queensland Cup for more rugby league exposure. In just half a season, Faraimo had scored 29 tries.

=== Parramatta Eels ===
In November 2013, due to the exposure from the World Cup, Faraimo signed a two-year contract with National Rugby League team, the Parramatta Eels.

In round 21 of the 2014 NRL season, Faraimo made his NRL debut for Parramatta against the Cronulla-Sutherland Sharks. He scored two tries on debut in the club's 32–12 win at Remondis Stadium.

On 21 September 2014, Faraimo was named at wing in the 2014 New South Wales Cup Team of the Year.

On 4 April 2015, Faraimo re-signed with Parramatta on a one-year contract.

On 3 May 2016, Faraimo played for the New South Wales Residents against the Queensland Residents.

On 2 May 2017, Faraimo played for the New South Wales Residents against the Queensland Residents for the second year in a row.

=== New Zealand Warriors ===
In July 2017, Faraimo joined the New Zealand Warriors for the remainder of the season, after being released from his Eels contract. Although joining the Warriors for the remainder of 2017, he planned to join the Super League in 2018. On 28 August 2017, he was named on the wing in the 2017 Intrust Super Premiership NSW Team of the Year. He didn't play an NRL game for the Warriors.

=== Hull F.C. ===
In August 2017, he signed a two-year contract with Super League side Hull FC, starting in 2018.

He played 13 games for Hull F.C. in the 2020 Super League season including the club's semi-final defeat against Wigan as they got within one game of the grand final.

=== Castleford Tigers ===
In round 18 of the 2022 Super League season, Faraimo scored two tries in Castleford's 34–20 loss against Leeds at Magic Weekend. In round 20 of the 2022 Super League season, Faraimo scored two tries for Castleford in a 46–18 victory over Hull F.C. In round 22 of the 2022 Super League season, Faraimo scored a hat-trick in Castleford's 20–12 loss against St Helens.

=== Doncaster RLFC ===
On 4 August 2023, it was announced that he, along with Mahe Fonua would join Doncaster RLFC for the remainder of the 2023 season, following the pair's release from Castleford. Faraimo only played one game for Doncaster, the League One play-off grand final victory over the North Wales Crusaders. In February 2024, Faraimo announced he would not be playing for Doncaster in 2024.

On 3 May 2024 it was announced that Doncaster RLFC had re-signed Faraimo for the remainder of the 2024 season.

On 21 October 2026 it was announced that he was amongst 6 players released by Doncaster RLFC

=== Hunslet RLFC (loan) ===
On 20 February 2026 it was reported that he had signed for Hunslet RLFC in the RFL Championship on loan

=== Hull RUFC ===
On 10 November 2026 it was reported that he had joined Regional 1 North East rugby union side Hull RUFC

== Representative career ==
In 2009 and 2010, Faraimo played for the New Zealand Residents.

In 2011, Faraimo played for the Queensland Rangers team.

In 2013, Faraimo was selected in the United States 2013 Rugby League World Cup squad, qualifying because his father was born on Swains Island, an island administered by the United States as part of American Samoa.

Faraimo competed in the 2017 Rugby League World Cup for the United States, featuring in all three pool matches: losing 12–58 to Fiji, 0–46 to Italy and 0–64 to Papua New Guinea.

Faraimo returned to action for the United States two years later, playing in the 2019 Rugby League World Cup 9s before heading to Jacksonville, Florida for the nation's 2021 Rugby League World Cup qualifier match against Cook Islands.
