= Alex Sutcliffe =

English rugby league footballer

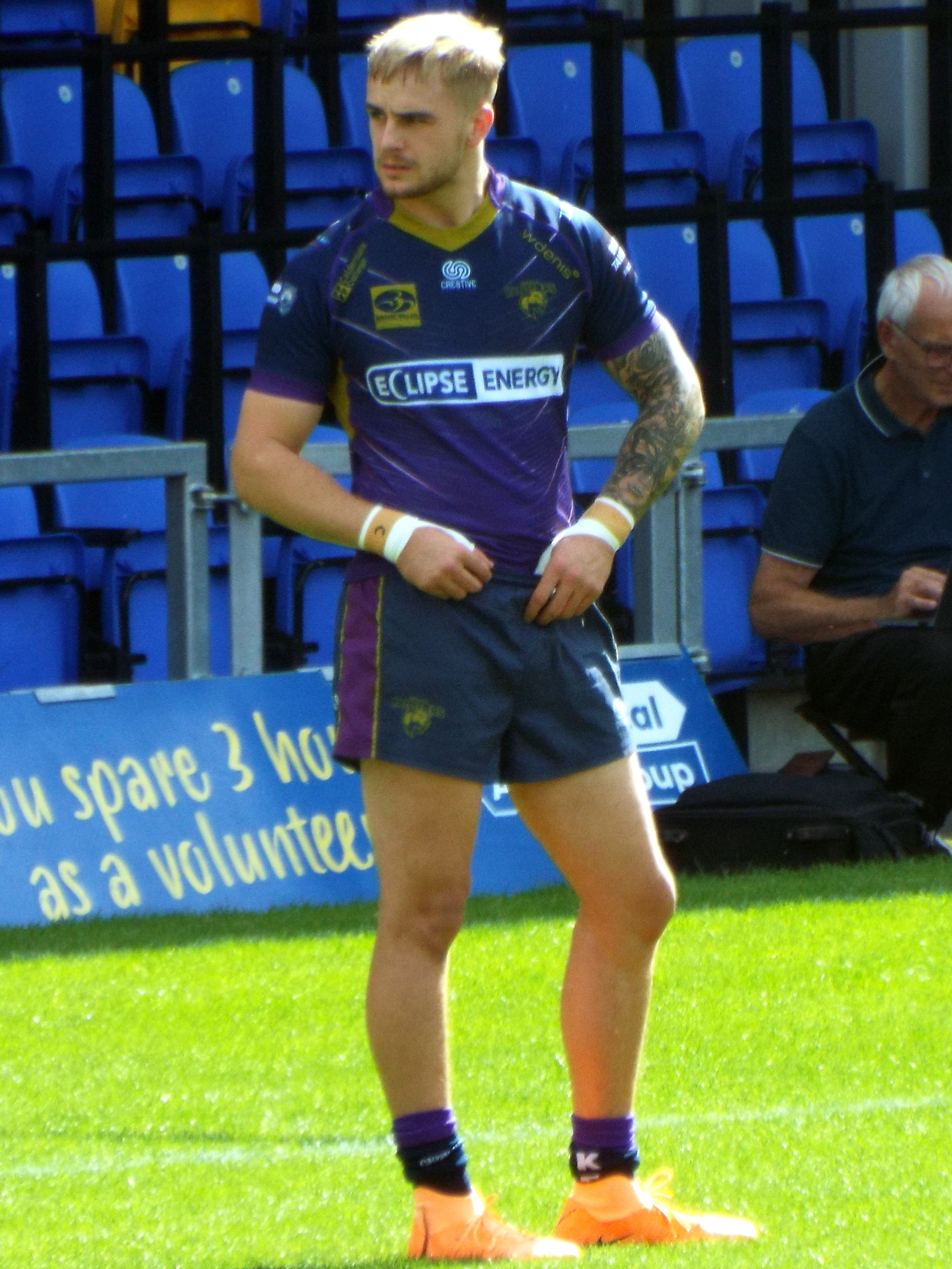

Personal information
- Full name: Alexander Sutcliffe
- Born: 21 January 1999 (age 27) Wakefield, West Yorkshire, England
- Height: 6 ft 1 in (1.85 m)
- Weight: 15 st 8 lb (99 kg)

Playing information
- Position: Centre, Second-row
Club
Years	Team	Pld	T	G	FG	P
2017–21	Leeds Rhinos	17	2	0	0	8
2019(DR)	→ Featherstone Rovers	19	16	0	0	64
2020(DR)	→ Featherstone Rovers	2	0	0	0	0
2021(loan)	→ Featherstone Rovers	0	0	0	0	0
2022–23	Castleford Tigers	23	2	0	0	8
2022(loan)	→ Midlands Hurricanes	1	1	0	0	4
2023(DR)	→ Halifax Panthers	1	0	0	0	0
2024–26	Doncaster RLFC	50	8	0	0	32
	Total	113	29	0	0	116
- Source: As of 22 November 2026

Alexander Sutcliffe (born 21 January 1999) is an English professional rugby league footballer who last played as a centre and second-row forward for Doncaster RLFC in the RFL Championship.

He has previously played for the Leeds Rhinos, and spent time on loan from Leeds at Featherstone Rovers in the Championship.

== Background ==
Sutcliffe was born in Wakefield, West Yorkshire, England.

He is not related to former Rhinos teammate Liam Sutcliffe. He has an older brother and a younger sister. He attended Royds School.

== Career ==
=== Leeds Rhinos ===
In 2017 he made his Super League début for Leeds against the Wigan Warriors.

He has spent time on loan at Featherstone Rovers in the 2019 Betfred Championship.

On 17 October 2020, he played in the 2020 Challenge Cup Final victory for Leeds over Salford at Wembley Stadium.

=== Featherstone Rovers (loan) ===
On 9 Aug 2021 it was reported that he had signed for Featherstone Rovers in the RFL Championship on loan for the remainder of the 2021 season.

=== Castleford Tigers ===
On 21 September 2021, it was reported that he had signed for Castleford in the Super League Sutcliffe was limited to only seven games for Castleford in the Super League XXVIII season as the club finished 11th on the table narrowly avoiding relegation.

=== Doncaster RLFC ===
On 27 October 2023 it was reported that he will join Doncaster RLFC for the 2024 season.

On 21 October 2026 it was announced that he was amongst 6 players released by Doncaster RLFC
