= Mahe Fonua =

Tonga international rugby league footballer (born 1992)

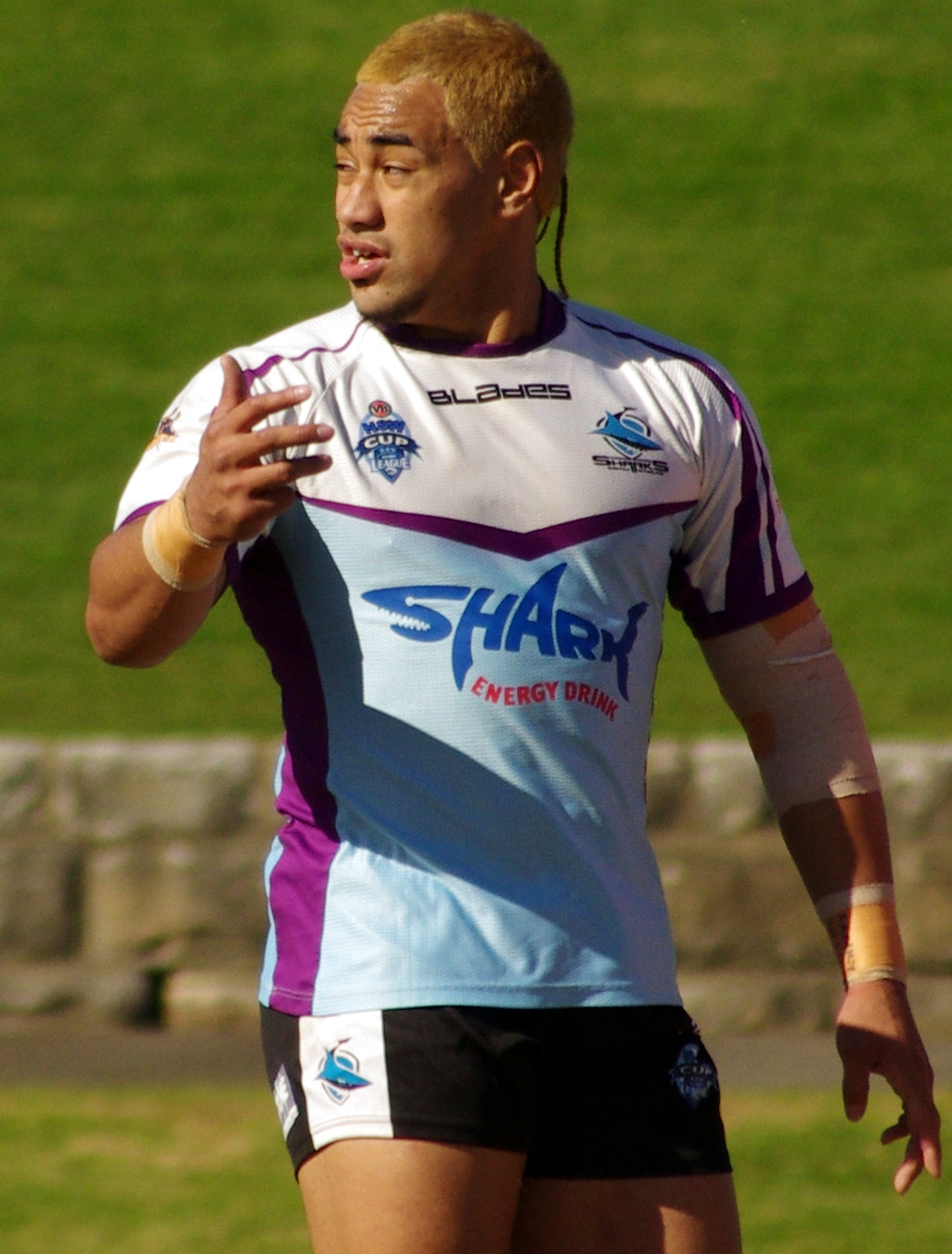

Personal information
- Full name: Mahe Pikokivaha Fonua
- Born: 24 December 1992 (age 33) Melbourne, Victoria, Australia
- Height: 5 ft 10 in (1.78 m)
- Weight: 16 st 7 lb (105 kg)

Playing information
- Position: Centre, Wing
Club
Years	Team	Pld	T	G	FG	P
2012–15	Melbourne Storm	50	24	0	0	96
2016–17	Hull F.C.	58	30	0	0	120
2018–19	Wests Tigers	21	6	0	0	24
2020–21	Hull F.C.	38	16	0	0	64
2022–23	Castleford Tigers	35	6	0	0	24
2023(loan)	→Halifax Panthers	1	0	0	0	0
2023	Doncaster	5	8	0	0	32
	Total	208	90	0	0	360
Representative
Years	Team	Pld	T	G	FG	P
2013–17	Tonga	6	3	0	0	12
2022	Combined Nations All Stars	1	0	0	0	0
- Source: As of 20 November 2026

Mahe Fonua (born 24 December 1992) is a former Tonga international rugby league footballer who last played as a centre or winger for Mackay Cutters in the Queensland Cup.

He has previously played for the Melbourne Storm and the Wests Tigers in the NRL and Hull FC in two separate spells in the Super League.

In 2012 he became the first Victorian born and bred player to play for the Melbourne Storm at NRL level.

== Early life ==
Fonua was born in Melbourne, Victoria, Australia. He was educated at Wellington Secondary College before moving to Canberra and attending Erindale College in the years of 2008 & 2009 and completing year 12. At the end of 2009 Fonua returned to Victoria where he attended Hallam Secondary College In the following year repeating year 12 to play for the Hallam School rugby league team.

He played his junior football for the South Eastern Titans in the Melbourne Rugby League, before being signed by the Canberra Raiders.

In 2006 and 2007, Fonua represented the Victoria Under 15s team, he also represented the Victoria Under 18s team.

In 2008 and 2009, he represented the Australian Capital Territory Under 18s team. He played for the Raiders' SG Ball team as the Storm did not have an SG Ball team at that time, before returning to Melbourne after being signed by the Melbourne Storm.

== Playing career ==
Fonua played for Melbourne's NYC team from 2010 to 2012, scoring 32 tries in 45 games. At the end of the 2011 season, Fonua was named at centre in the 2011 NYC Team of the Year.

=== 2012 ===
In Round 23 of the 2012 NRL season, Fonua made his NRL debut for Melbourne against the Gold Coast Titans on the wing in Melbourne's 24–16 win at AAMI Park, becoming the first Victorian born and bred player to represent the Storm in first-grade. In Fonua's third game for Melbourne in the Finals 1 week match against the South Sydney Rabbitohs, Fonua scored his first NRL try in the 24–10 win at AAMI Park, after previously being denied tries on four occasions by the video referee, once in his debut, twice in his second game, and once prior to his try in his third game. Fonua finished off his debut year with 4 matches and one a try. On 2 October, Fonua was named at wing in the Junior Kangaroos team to face the Junior Kiwis.

=== 2013 ===
Fonua played in Melbourne's 2013 World Club Challenge victory over Leeds. He was selected to play for his parents' country of origin Tonga on 20 April against Samoa in the Pacific Rugby League International at Penrith Stadium. He scored 2 tries in the 36–4 victory. On 10 June, Fonua extended his contract with Melbourne, keeping at the club till the end of the 2015 season. In Round 21 against Canberra at Canberra Stadium, Fonua scored a hat-trick of tries in the 68–4 win including a spectacular set up for Will Chambers after the ball seemed almost certain to go dead, with some commentators comparing it to the famous set up by Greg Inglis during the centenary test. Fonua was selected in the Tonga 24 man 2013 Rugby League World Cup squad, playing in 2 of their 3 matches.

=== 2014 ===
Fonua was selected in Melbourne's inaugural 2014 NRL Auckland Nines squad. He finished Melbourne's 2014 NRL season with him playing in 20 matches and scoring 10 tries.

=== 2015 ===
On 2 May, Fonua played on the wing for Tonga 16–18 loss in the Polynesian Cup. He finished his last season with the Melbourne Storm with 13 matches and 4 tries. On 17 October, he represented Tonga again, this time in their Asia-Pacific Qualifier match against the Cook Islands for the 2017 Rugby League World Cup.

=== 2016 ===
On 1 August, he signed a three-year contract with Super League team Hull F.C. starting in 2016. Fonua had an outstanding first season with the club and quickly established himself as a fan favourite. He helped Hull F.C. reach the Challenge Cup Final where they would go on to beat the Warrington Wolves by a narrow score of 12–10. Fonua scored the first of Hull FC's two tries at Wembley Stadium.

In his first season in the Super League, he scored 15 tries which contributed to him being selected for the Super League Dream Team along with 5 other Hull teammates.

=== 2017 ===
On 9 June 2017, it was confirmed that Fonua would return to the NRL, to join the Wests Tigers, starting in the 2018 season.

On 26 August 2017, Fonua would go on to win the Challenge Cup for a second year in a row, contributing massively to the 18–14 win over the Wigan Warriors by scoring two of Hull's three tries at Wembley Stadium.

Fonua finished the year with making the 2017 Super League Dream Team for a second year in a row, but this time as a winger.

=== 2018 ===
At the start of the 2018 NRL season, Fonua spent the first few weeks playing for Western Suburbs in the Intrust Super Premiership NSW. After a number of good performances, Fonua was called up to play for the Wests Tigers. Fonua made his debut for the club in their 22–20 defeat Parramatta. He played two games on the wing before being switched to centre. On 15 May, Fonua was demoted to reserve grade for showing up late to training, days after a Man of the Match performance. Weeks later, he was sidelined after breaking his arm, but made a return later in the year.

Despite only scoring one try from his ten appearances, Fonua lead the club and was fifth in the NRL for post-contact metres. He also gained attention for his mullet haircut.

=== 2019 ===
In the 2019 NRL season, Fonua suffered a season ending injury. Fonua later announced his return to Super League side Hull FC.

=== 2020 ===
Fonua played 17 games for Hull FC in the 2020 Super League season including the club's semi-final loss against Wigan.

=== 2021 ===
In round 9 of the 2021 Super League season, Fonua scored two tries for Hull F.C. in a 30–12 victory over Castleford. On 8 October it was announced that Fonua had been released by Hull FC with a year left on his contract. On 13 October 2021, Castleford Tigers confirmed the signing of Fonua on an initial one-year deal with the option of a further two years.

=== 2022 ===
Fonua was assigned squad number 17 for the 2022 season. He made his Castleford debut on 11 February against the Salford Red Devils in the opening round of Super League. He scored his first try for the club on 12 March against the Huddersfield Giants.

=== 2023 ===
On 4 August 2023 it was announced that he, along with Bureta Faraimo would join Doncaster RLFC for the remainder of the 2023 season, following the pair's release from Castleford Tigers.

=== 2025 ===
On 12 November 2025 he announced his retirement

== Honours ==
=== Club ===
==== Melbourne Storm ====
- World Club Challenge: (1) 2013

==== Hull F.C. ====
- Challenge Cup: (2) 2016, 2017

=== Individual ===
- Super League Dream Team: (2) 2016 as a Centre and 2017 as a Winger
