= Lee Radford =

English rugby league coach and former England international rugby league footballer

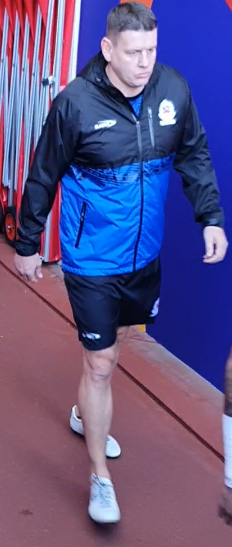

Personal information
- Full name: Lee Stephen Radford
- Born: 26 March 1979 (age 47) Kingston upon Hull, Humberside, England
- Height: 6 ft 2 in (1.88 m)
- Weight: 16 st 1 lb (102 kg)

Playing information
- Position: Second-row, Loose forward, Prop
Club
Years	Team	Pld	T	G	FG	P
1996–98	Hull FC	18	3	1	0	14
1998–05	Bradford Bulls	158	22	12	0	112
2006–12	Hull FC	175	22	1	0	90
	Total	351	47	14	0	216
Representative
Years	Team	Pld	T	G	FG	P
	Yorkshire
2001–06	England	5	1	0	0	4

Coaching information

Rugby league
Club
Years	Team	Gms	W	D	L	W%
2014–20	Hull FC	190	95	3	92	50
2022	Samoa (Defence Coach)
2022–23	Castleford Tigers	32	14	0	18	44
	Total	222	109	3	110	49

Rugby union
Club
Years	Team	Gms	W	D	L	W%
2020	Dallas Jackals; Defence coach
2023–	Northampton Saints; Defence coach
	Total	0	0	0	0
Representative
Years	Team	Gms	W	D	L	W%
2025–	Scotland; Defence coach
- Source: As of 6 October 2025

Lee Radford (born 26 March 1979) is an English professional rugby union coach, and former rugby league footballer and coach. Since 2023 he has worked for Premiership Rugby club Northampton Saints as their defence coach.

He previously worked in rugby league as the head coach of Hull FC, in the Super League, from 2013 to 2020 and as head coach of Castleford Tigers from 2022 to 2023.

As a player, he was an England international second-row forward who played for Hull F.C. and the Bradford Bulls in the Super League, and for Yorkshire.

== Background ==
Radford was born in Kingston upon Hull, East Riding Of Yorkshire, England.

== Playing career ==
Radford made his professional début for hometown club Hull Sharks (Heritage № 910) before moving to Bradford in 1998. Radford played for the Bradford Bulls from the interchange bench in their 2003 Super League Grand Final victory against the Wigan Warriors. Having won Super League VIII, Bradford played against 2003 NRL Premiers, the Penrith Panthers in the 2004 World Club Challenge. Radford played at second-row in the Bulls' 22–4 victory. He also played for Bradford at loose forward in their 2004 Super League Grand Final loss against the Leeds Rhinos. Radford played for the Bradford Bulls at loose forward in their 2005 Super League Grand Final victory against the Leeds Rhinos.

Radford later returned to his hometown club of Hull FC, who he joined for the start of 2006's Super League XI. Hull reached the 2006 Super League Grand final to be contested against St. Helens, playing at second-row in his side's 4–26 loss.

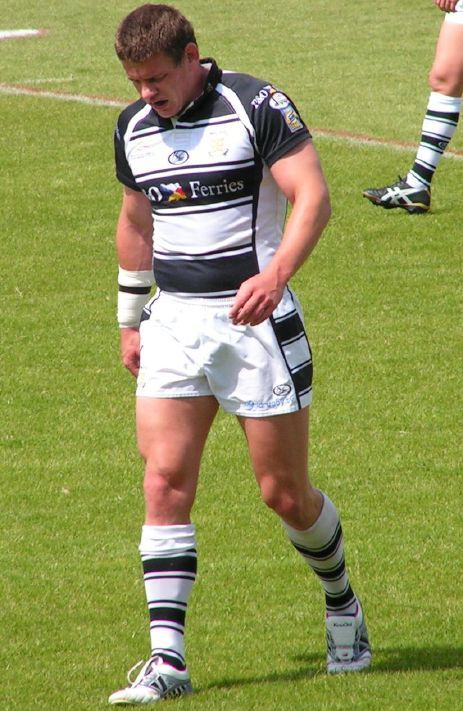
Radford playing for Hull F.C. in 2007

Radford would also play in Hull's 28-16 2008 Challenge Cup final loss to St Helens.

Lee Radford took part in a boxing match, the Rumble in the Humber, against fellow rugby league player, Stuart Fielden which raised £50,000 for Steve Prescott. He won the fight, stopping Fielden in the second round. He was appointed Hull's captain for 2007.

On 6 October 2011 Lee Radford announced his retirement from the game, to take up a 3-year deal as an assistant coach at Hull F.C.

=== Statistics ===
The table below shows a cumulative points and scoring records for Radford at the end of the 2012 Super League season.

Club	Years active	Appearances	Tries	Goals	FG	Points
Hull Sharks	1998	9	2			8
Bradford Bulls	1999-05	154	22	12		112
Hull F.C.	2006–12	175	21	1		86

=== International career ===
Radford won a cap for England against Wales while at Bradford Bulls in 2001. He played for England again in 2005 against, France and New Zealand. Radford again played for England while at Hull in 2006 against France, Tonga, and Samoa.

== Coaching career ==
=== Hull FC ===
On 18 September 2013, Radford was unveiled as the new head coach at Hull FC, where he had been the assistant coach under Peter Gentle. His first game in charge was a pre-season friendly against Doncaster, and his first competitive game was against the Catalans Dragons in Super League XIX.

After a shaky start to his coaching career he found success in 2016 becoming the first Hull F.C. coach to lead the team to a challenge cup victory at Wembley Stadium, the victory coming in the 2016 Challenge Cup final. The win came against Warrington Wolves with a score of 12-10. Hull F.C. had previously lost 8 finals at the national stadium (despite having won the cup on 3 previous occasions at other venues).

That year he would also lead his team to the Super League play-off semi-finals but would fail to reach the final after being defeated by the Wigan Warriors 28-18.

Radford's coaching success would continue the following year when he once again led Hull F.C. to victory in the 2017 Challenge Cup final with an 18-14 win over the Wigan Warriors, having now led Hull F.C. to two Challenge Cup victories in a row.

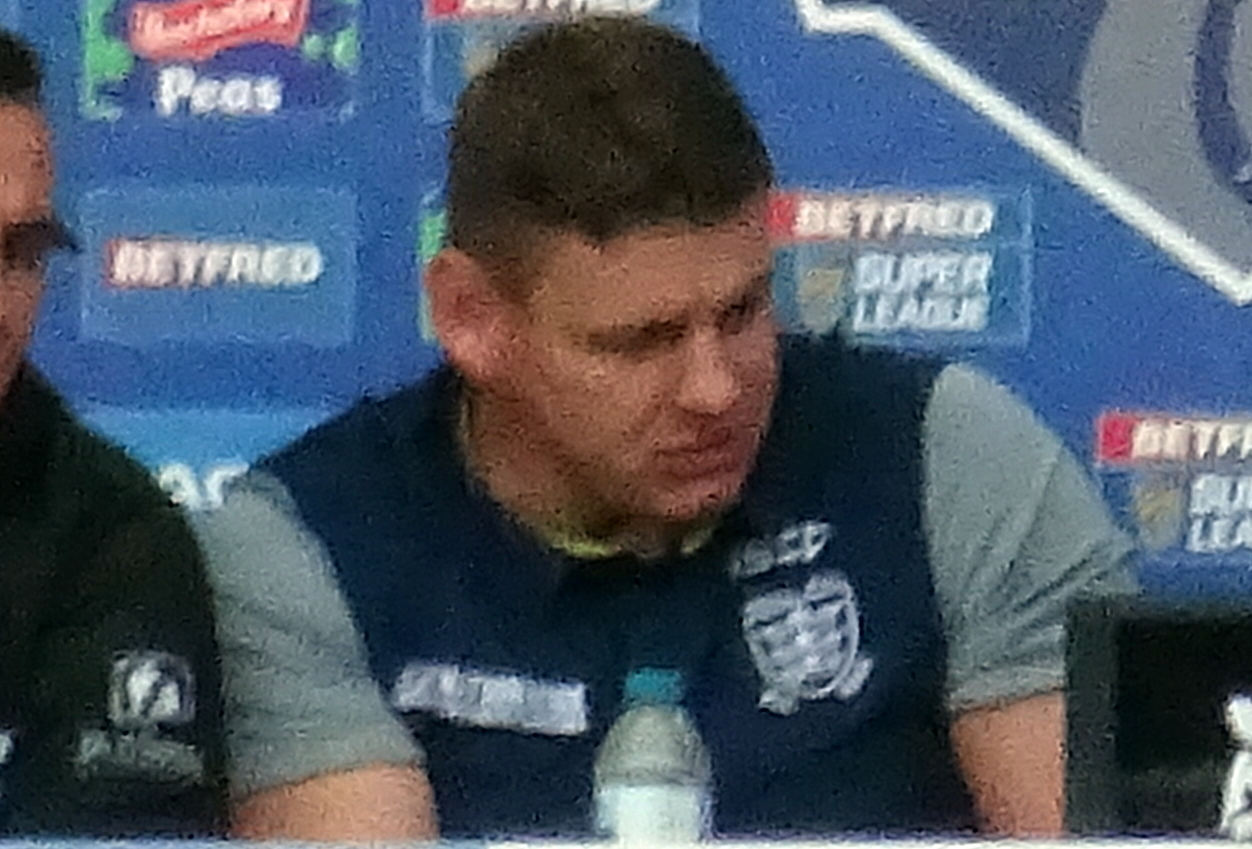
Radford coaching Hull F.C. in 2019

Immediately after their loss to the Warrington Wolves on 12 March 2020, Hull FC chief executive Adam Pearson told a live TV interview that Radford had been sacked, minutes after the 38-4 loss.

=== Dallas Jackals ===
In June 2020, it was announced that Radford had joined Major League Rugby side Dallas Jackals as defensive coach.

=== Castleford Tigers ===
On 27 April 2021 it was announced that he would take over the head coach role for the 2022 season, on a two-year deal, when Daryl Powell leaves at the end of the 2021 season. In round 1 of the 2022 Super League season, Radford coached his first game in charge of Castleford which ended in a 26-16 defeat against Salford.

On 6 March 2023, it was announced that Radford had left Castleford, by mutual agreement, with assistant coach Andy Last taking over as interim manager.

=== Scotland RU ===
On 6 October 2025 it was reported he was set to join the Scotland coaching staff as defence coach

== Honours ==
=== Playing career ===
==== Bradford Bulls ====
- Super League: (2) 2003, 2005
  - Runner-up: (1) 2004
- Challenge Cup: (1) 2003
- World Club Challenge: (1) 2004

==== Hull FC ====
- Super League
  - Runner-up: (1) 2006
- Challenge Cup
  - Runner-up: (1) 2008

=== Coaching career ===
==== Hull FC ====
- Challenge Cup: (2) 2016, 2017.
