= Andy Last =

English rugby league footballer and coach

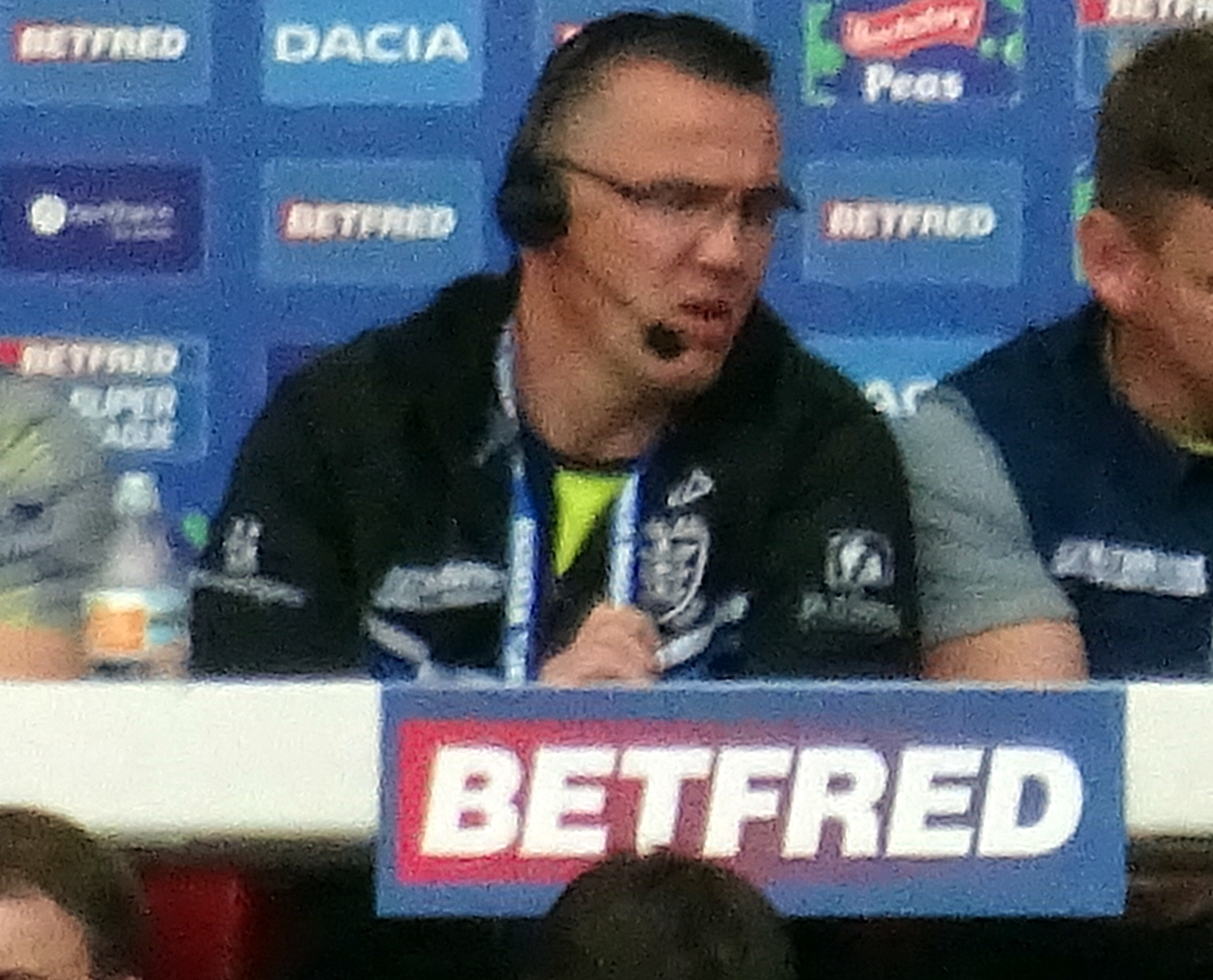

Personal information
- Full name: Andrew Gary Last
- Born: 25 March 1981 (age 45) Kingston upon Hull, Humberside, England

Playing information
- Position: Hooker
Club
Years	Team	Pld	T	G	FG	P
1999–05	Hull FC	29	4	0	0	16

Coaching information
Club
Years	Team	Gms	W	D	L	W%
2020	Hull FC	14	8	0	6	57
2023	Castleford Tigers	19	4	0	15	21
2026	Hull FC	19	5	0	14	26
	Total	52	17	0	35	33
- Source: As of 12 September 2026

Andy Last (born 25 March 1981) is an English professional rugby league coach who is the interim head coach for Hull FC in the Super League and a former professional rugby league footballer.

He is a former head coach of Hull FC and the Castleford Tigers in the Super League, and was the assistant coach for the England national rugby league team. He played as a hooker for Hull FC in the Super League between 1999 and 2005.

== Background ==
Last was born in Kingston upon Hull, Humberside, England.

== Playing career ==
On 1 August 1999, Last made his Super League debut for Hull FC against the Warrington Wolves. The return of Lee Jackson to Hull in 2001 saw Last playing mainly for the A-team, before he suffered a broken tibia and fibula to end his career prematurely. He made a total of 29 appearances and scored 4 tries, with his final appearance made at the age of 24.

== Coaching career ==
=== Hull F.C. (youth, assistant, interim) ===
Last joined the coaching staff of Hull FC. In 2005, he led the club's under-21s side to Academy Grand Final victory. He worked as an assistant coach for the first team under Lee Radford, winning back-to-back Challenge Cups in 2016 and 2017.

On 12 March 2020, Last was announced as Hull's interim head coach following Radford's dismissal, with Kieron Purtill being his assistant. Four days later, the season was suspended due to the COVID-19 pandemic, and Last would only coach his first game in August. He guided Hull to a 6th-placed finish and reached the play-off semi-finals. In November 2020, Hull appointed Brett Hodgson as their new head coach, with Last offered an alternative position.

=== Wakefield Trinity (assistant) ===
On 21 December 2020, Wakefield Trinity appointed Last as an assistant coach, to work alongside Chris Chester and Willie Poching. Last said he opted for this role to "spread [his] wings and gain some different experiences", rather than remaining at Hull in a role "tailored to his skill-set" according to chairman Adam Pearson.

=== Castleford Tigers (assistant, interim) ===
On 29 September 2021, the Castleford Tigers announced the appointment of Last as assistant coach following the arrival of Lee Radford as head coach.

On 6 March 2023, Last was appointed interim head coach of Castleford when Radford was relieved of his duties. He took charge of six fixtures while the club held talks with candidates in their selection process. On 19 April 2023, he was named as full-time head coach on a two-and-a-half-year deal. On 4 August 2023, immediately following a defeat against Huddersfield that left the Tigers at the bottom of the Super League table for the first time, Last departed Castleford.

=== England (assistant) ===
In April 2020, while interim head coach of Hull FC, Last joined the coaching staff for the England national team in the build up towards the 2021 Rugby League World Cup.

In June 2024, Last was acting head coach for England's mid-season game against France, as head coach Shaun Wane was recovering from an ankle operation. Last guided England to a 40–8 victory.

=== Hull F.C. interim head coach ===
In April 2026, Last became the interim head coach of Hull F.C. for a second time after John Cartwright stepped down from the role effective immediately.
