= 2024 Castleford Tigers season =

English rugby league season

Castleford Tigers 2024 season
- Super League rank: 10th
- Play-off result: Did not qualify
- Challenge Cup: Quarter-finals
- 2024 record: Wins: 8; draws: 1; losses: 20
- Points scored: For: 459; against: 809

Team information
- Chairman: Ian Fulton
- Head Coach: Craig Lingard
- Captain: Paul McShane & Joe Westerman
- Stadium: Wheldon Road
- Avg. attendance: 7,945
- Agg. attendance: 103,279
- High attendance: 10,170
- Low attendance: 6,965

Top scorers
- Tries: Innes Senior (17)
- Goals: Rowan Milnes (51)
- Points: Rowan Milnes (135)
← 2023	List of seasons	2025 →

The 2024 season was the Castleford Tigers' 99th season in the Rugby Football League and their 17th consecutive season in the top flight of English rugby league. The club competed in the 2024 Super League and the 2024 Challenge Cup.

This was Castleford's first and only season under Craig Lingard as head coach. The team was jointly captained by Paul McShane and Joe Westerman. They finished the Super League season in 10th place.

== Kits ==
Supplier: Oxen
Main sponsor: CBR Engineering

Home	Away	Third (Note: In tribute to Adrian Vowles)

== Season overview ==
After a poor 2023 season where they were drawn into a relegation scrap with Wakefield, Castleford's 11th-placed finish narrowly secured a position in the Super League for 2024. The head coach role had been left vacant after the expiry of Danny Ward's short-term deal. On 17 October 2023, it was announced that former assistant Craig Lingard had been appointed, becoming the club's fourth permanent head coach within 12 months. Danny McGuire additionally joined from Hull KR as the new assistant coach. Joe Westerman was named co-captain alongside Paul McShane.

In the offseason, the playing squad underwent a large turnover with a focus on reducing average age. Departures included mainstays Nathan Massey and Greg Eden along with senior players such as Gareth Widdop, Niall Evalds and Jordan Turner. Under the new IMG grading system, league status would no longer be solely dependent on table position, so the team operated with a reduced playing budget as the club prioritised off-field improvements. Accordingly, the Tigers were widely predicted to compete with newly promoted London for the 'wooden spoon'. On the eve of the season, their proposals for an upgrade of Wheldon Road were approved by the council.

Castleford began the season poorly, falling to defeats against highly-rated Wigan, Salford and Warrington in the opening rounds. After a heavy loss to Huddersfield in round 4, Lingard said the team's capitulation was unacceptable and moved poor performers to the reserves. The team showed improved resilience despite defeat in the following round at Catalans, and they saw off Championship side Batley to advance in the Challenge Cup. However, they were unable to break down Leeds in round 6, with first-half control not being converted into points by their blunt attack; this sixth consecutive league loss marked Castleford's worst start to a season since 2004.

The Tigers secured their first league win of the year against Salford in round 7, with Innes Senior notably scoring four tries. However, with injury problems mounting and fifteen players unavailable, Castleford crashed out of the cup with a 54-point loss to Wigan. In April, the club announced a host of midseason signings including Tex Hoy, Louis Senior and Corey Hall. Another league defeat to Wigan was followed by an impressive 40–0 win against London, and a late comeback against Leigh secured a thrilling draw in round 10. Castleford's hit-and-miss performances continued over the following weeks, when they were trounced by St Helens, won against table rivals Hull (with Hoy scoring the club's try of the season), and were comfortably beaten by Leeds.

June saw an upturn in the team's performances, with battling displays in consecutive games against the eventual top two, Wigan and Hull KR – only beaten by one penalty goal and one drop goal respectively. Centre Sam Wood's impressive form earned him an England call up, but he suffered an injury on international duty that ruled him out for the season. In round 16, Castleford edged a low-scoring affair to earn an away win against St Helens for only the second time in 34 years. They then duly beat bottom side London, before the standout performance of the year against Catalans secured a third straight victory with two tries from Liam Horne. Lingard said the team was "unrecognisable" from the start of the year, having surpassed their 2023 points tally by July. Their streak was brought to an end by two hard-fought defeats at the hands of play-off hopefuls Salford and Leigh.

In round 21, Castleford sustained their heaviest defeat in three months in their visit to table-topping Hull KR. They went into their Magic Weekend fixture against Huddersfield just a point adrift of their 9th-placed opponents, however a meagre loss diminished hopes of moving up the table. Lingard began to rotate the team in the remaining rounds, experimenting with different combinations and giving minutes to academy players like Jenson Windley, Fletcher Rooney and Akim Matvejev. A flat defeat to Warrington was followed by a high-scoring win against Hull, where Rowan Milnes notched 19 points. Castleford fell to substantial losses against Leigh, St Helens, and Huddersfield in the final three rounds of the season, dampening the improved mood around the club, although their 10th-placed finish represented a marginal improvement on the previous campaign. Alex Mellor was named Tigers Player of the Year, and Liam Horne was voted Players' Player of the Year.

== First-team squad ==
2024 Castleford Tigers Squad
First team squad			Coaching staff
(England) 1 Luke Hooley – FB, CE; (England) 2 Josh Simm – WG, CE; (England) 3 Jack Broadbent – CE, FB, HK, SO; (England) 4 Sam Wood – CE; (Ireland) 5 Innes Senior – WG; (England) 6 Danny Richardson (gk) – SH; (Australia) 7 Jacob Miller – SO, SH; (England) 8 Liam Watts – PR; (England) 9 Paul McShane (c) – HK, SH; (England) 10 George Lawler – PR, SR, HK, LF; (Lebanon) 11 Elie El-Zakhem – SR; (England) 12 Alex Mellor – SR, CE; (England) 13 Joe Westerman (c) – LF, PR, SO	(Papua New Guinea) 14 Liam Horne – HK, LF; (England) 15 George Griffin – PR; (England) 16 Rowan Milnes (gk) – SO, SH; (Papua New Guinea) 17 Nixon Putt – PR, SR; (England) 18 Josh Hodson – CE; (England) 19 Sam Hall – PR, LF; (Nigeria) 20 Muizz Mustapha – PR; (Papua New Guinea) 21 Sylvester Namo – PR; (Lebanon) 22 Charbel Tasipale – SR, CE; (Fiji) 23 Jason Qareqare – WG; (England) 24 Cain Robb – HK; (England) 25 Brad Martin – PR, SR; (Democratic Republic of the Congo) 26 Samy Kibula – PR	(Tonga) 27 Albert Vete – PR; (England) 28 Will Tate – CE, WG; (England) 29 George Hill – LF, HK; (Jamaica) 30 Luis Johnson – SR; (England) 31 Fletcher Rooney – FB; (England) 32 Daniel Hindmarsh-Takyi – PR; (Ireland) 33 Louis Senior – WG; (Australia) 34 Tex Hoy – FB, SO; (England) 35 Corey Hall – CE; (England) 36 Sam Eseh – PR; (England) 37 Matty English – PR; (England) 38 Jenson Windley – SH; (Estonia) 39 Akim Matvejev – PR	Head coach: (England) Craig Lingard; Assistant coach: (England) Danny McGuire; Legend: (c) Captain(s); (vc) Vice-captain(s); (gk) Goal kicker

== Transfers and loans ==
=== Transfers in ===
No	Player	From	Contract	Date	Ref.
17	(Papua New Guinea) Nixon Putt	Central Queensland Capras	2 years	29 September 2023	
11	(Lebanon) Elie El-Zakhem	North Sydney Bears	2 years	29 September 2023	
21	(Papua New Guinea) Sylvester Namo	Townsville Blackhawks	2 years	1 October 2023	
18	(England) Josh Hodson	Batley Bulldogs	2 years	2 October 2023	
2	(England) Josh Simm	Wynnum Manly Seagulls	2 years	3 October 2023	
4	(England) Sam Wood	Hull Kingston Rovers	3 years	4 October 2023	
1	(England) Luke Hooley	Leeds Rhinos	2 years	5 October 2023	
16	(England) Rowan Milnes	Hull Kingston Rovers	2 years	8 October 2023	
26	(Democratic Republic of the Congo) Samy Kibula	Batley Bulldogs	1 year (Note: With an option for a further year)	19 October 2023	
30	(Jamaica) Luis Johnson	Hull Kingston Rovers	1 year	18 December 2023	
32	(England) Daniel Hindmarsh-Takyi	Northern Pride	2 years	5 February 2024	
34	(Australia) Tex Hoy	Hull F.C.	1 year	20 April 2024	

=== Loans in ===
No	Player	From	Loan type	Arrival	Return	Ref.
5	(Ireland) Innes Senior	Huddersfield Giants	Season-long	11 October 2023	Permanent (Note: The deal was made permanent at the end of the season)	
33	(Ireland) Louis Senior	Hull Kingston Rovers	Two-week, rolling	16 April 2024	Permanent	
33	(Ireland) Louis Senior	Hull Kingston Rovers	Season-long	23 April 2024	Permanent	
35	(England) Corey Hall	Hull Kingston Rovers	Season-long	23 April 2024	20 September 2024	
36	(England) Sam Eseh	Wigan Warriors	Two-week	23 April 2024	1 May 2024	
36	(England) Sam Eseh	Wigan Warriors	Two-week	7 May 2024	21 May 2024	
37	(England) Matty English	Huddersfield Giants	Two-week, rolling	12 June 2024	15 July 2024	

=== Transfers out ===
No	Player	To	Contract	Date	Ref.
16	(England) Adam Milner	Huddersfield Giants	1 year (Note: Initially joined on loan during the 2023 season, with the deal being made permanent ahead of 2024)	25 May 2023	
1	(England) Niall Evalds	Hull Kingston Rovers	2 years	23 August 2023	
3	(Jamaica) Jordan Turner	Oldham	2 years	23 August 2023	
14	(England) Nathan Massey	Featherstone Rovers	1 year	12 September 2023	
2	(England) Greg Eden	Halifax Panthers	2 years	19 September 2023	
23	(Samoa) Suaia Matagi	Doncaster	1 year	19 September 2023	
15	(England) Alex Sutcliffe	Doncaster	1 year	20 September 2023	
27	(England) Bailey Dawson	Dewsbury Rams	1 year	20 September 2023	
29	(England) Kieran Hudson	Leeds Rhinos	1 year	20 September 2023	
30	(England) Jacob Hookem	Dewsbury Rams	1 year	20 September 2023	
35	(England) Ilikaya Mafi	Doncaster	1 year	20 September 2023	
11	(Cook Islands) Kenny Edwards	Mackay Cutters (Note: Edwards initially announced his retirement, but later joined the Mackay Cutters on a two-year deal)	2 years	20 September 2023	
26	(Nigeria) Elliot Wallis	Huddersfield Giants	4 years	11 October 2023	
6	(England) Gareth Widdop	Halifax Panthers (Note: Widdop initially announced his retirement, but later joined the Halifax Panthers on a one-year deal)	1 year	18 October 2023	
33	(England) Aaron Willis	Midlands Hurricanes	1 year	22 October 2023	
—	(England) Jacques O'Neill	Released		22 October 2023	
27	(Tonga) Albert Vete	Released		19 April 2024	
22	(Lebanon) Charbel Tasipale	Western Suburbs Magpies	½ year	24 June 2024	

=== Loans out ===
No	Player	To	Loan type	Departure	Return	Ref.
29	(England) George Hill	Whitehaven	Two-week, rolling	27 March 2024	10 April 2024	
3	(England) Jack Broadbent	Hull Kingston Rovers	Season-long	23 April 2024	Permanent	
32	(England) Daniel Hindmarsh-Takyi	Whitehaven	Two-week, rolling	26 April 2024	28 June 2024	
1	(England) Luke Hooley	Featherstone Rovers	Two-week	3 May 2024	17 May 2024	
6	(England) Danny Richardson	Hull Kingston Rovers	Season-long	9 May 2024	Permanent	
30	(Jamaica) Luis Johnson	Featherstone Rovers	Two-week	13 June 2024	27 June 2024	
26	(Democratic Republic of the Congo) Samy Kibula	Featherstone Rovers	Season-long	26 July 2024	7 October 2024	

=== Dual registration ===
Castleford also agreed dual registration partnerships with Batley Bulldogs in the Championship and Newcastle Thunder in League One.

Club	No	Player	App	T	G	DG	Pts
Batley Bulldogs	1	(England) Luke Hooley	12	6	2	1	29
Batley Bulldogs	17	(Papua New Guinea) Nixon Putt	6	0	0	0	0
Batley Bulldogs	20	(Nigeria) Muizz Mustapha	2	0	0	0	0
Batley Bulldogs	26	(Democratic Republic of the Congo) Samy Kibula	6	0	0	0	0
Batley Bulldogs	29	(England) George Hill	1	0	0	0	0
Newcastle Thunder	17	(Papua New Guinea) Nixon Putt	1	0	0	0	0
Newcastle Thunder	21	(Papua New Guinea) Sylvester Namo	1	0	0	0	0
Newcastle Thunder	32	(England) Dan Hindmarsh	1	0	0	0	0
Newcastle Thunder	—	(England) Alfie Dean (Note: Castleford Reserves player)	3	0	0	0	0
Newcastle Thunder	—	(England) Jaiden Linford	1	0	0	0	0

Sources: RLRKC – Batley Bulldogs 2024 & RLRKC – Newcastle Thunder 2024

== Pre-season friendlies ==
Castleford's first fixture of 2024 was against Keighley Cougars, announced in November 2023. They also faced the London Broncos and the Huddersfield Giants, both announced in December.

Date	Opposition	H/A	Venue	Result	Score	Tries	Goals	Drop goals	Source
Sun 14 January (Note: Jake Webster's farewell match, after his testimonial was postponed in 2023)	Keighley Cougars	A	Cougar Park	W	54–0	Simm, Tasipale, I. Senior (2), Hodson (2), Miller, Horne, Johnson, Qareqare	Hooley (7/10)		
Sun 21 January	London Broncos	H	Wheldon Road	D	14–14	Wood, I. Senior (2)	Richardson (1/2), Hooley (0/1)		
Sun 4 February (Note: Paul McShane's testimonial match)	Huddersfield Giants	H	Wheldon Road	W	20–14	Watts, Wood (2), Simm	Hooley (2/4)		

== Super League ==
=== Results ===
On 23 November 2023, the Super League fixtures were announced. All fixtures are subject to change, and matches from round 16 onwards may be rescheduled for broadcast on Sky Sports.

Round 1: Sat 17 February	Castleford Tigers	4–32	Wigan Warriors	Castleford
17:30 GMT	Goals: Richardson (2/2) 8 (p)', 26 (p)' Sent off: Watts (red card) 29'	BBC Report; Sky Report	Tries: Mago 34'; French 38'; Marshall 51', 76'; Leeming 54'; Goals: Smith (5/6) 4 (p)', 35', 40', 55', 78'; Keighran (1/1) 30 (p)' Sin bin: Smith (yellow card) 21' to 31'	Stadium: Wheldon Road; Attendance: 10,170; Referee: Tom Grant

Round 2: Sun 25 February	Salford Red Devils	26–22	Castleford Tigers	Salford
15:00 GMT	Tries: Stone 10', 49'; Bourouh 13'; Macdonald 39'; Goals: Sneyd (5/5) 12', 15', 40', 50', 73 (p)' Sin bin: Ormondroyd (yellow card) 64' to 74'; Watkins (yellow card) 79' to 80'	BBC Report; Sky Report	Tries: Wood 23'; Broadbent 32'; Westerman 56'; Horne 78'; Goals: Richardson (1/2) 25'; Hooley (2/2) 57', 79'	Stadium: Salford Community Stadium; Attendance: 4,770; Referee: James Vella

Round 3: Fri 1 March	Warrington Wolves	30–8	Castleford Tigers	Warrington
20:00 GMT	Tries: Ashton 23', 29'; Philbin 34'; Dufty 42'; Thewlis 75'; Goals: Ratchford (5/5) 24', 31', 35', 40 (p)', 44'; Thewlis (0/1)	BBC Report; Sky Report	Tries: Simm 10'; I. Senior 49'; Goals: Milnes (0/2)	Stadium: Halliwell Jones Stadium; Attendance: 8,483; Referee: Aaron Moore

Round 4: Fri 8 March	Castleford Tigers	8–50	Huddersfield Giants	Castleford
20:00 GMT	Tries: I. Senior 23', 50'; Goals: Hooley (0/2)	BBC Report; Sky Report	Tries: Swift 7', 69'; Clune 14'; Halsall 32', 72'; Hewitt 40'; Cudjoe 63', 77'; Naiqama 79'; Goals: Russell (7/10) 8', 15', 35 (p)', 40', 70', 74', 78'	Stadium: Wheldon Road; Attendance: 7,040; Referee: Liam Moore

Round 5: Sat 16 March	Catalans Dragons	40–14	Castleford Tigers	Perpignan
18:30 CET	Tries: Mourgue 15'; Abdull 20'; Johnstone 36'; Laguerre 43'; Davies 49'; Ikuvalu 65'; Rougé 68'; Goals: Mourgue (6/7) 22', 37', 45', 51', 66', 68'	BBC Report; Sky Report	Tries: Westerman 34'; Simm 54', 77'; Goals: Milnes (1/3) 35'	Stadium: Stade Gilbert Brutus; Attendance: 8,159; Referee: James Vella

Round 6: Thu 28 March	Castleford Tigers	6–26	Leeds Rhinos	Castleford
20:00 GMT	Tries: Simm 71'; Goals: Richardson (1/2) 72'	BBC Report; Sky Report	Tries: Momirovski 42', 52'; Miller 66', 74'; Goals: Martin (5/5) 43', 53', 63 (p)', 67', 76'	Stadium: Wheldon Road; Attendance: 9,026; Referee: Aaron Moore

Round 7: Fri 5 April	Castleford Tigers	36–24	Salford Red Devils	Castleford
20:00 BST	Tries: I. Senior 15', 32', 57', 77'; Hall 25'; Martin 60'; Goals: Richardson (6/7) 17', 26', 33', 58', 61', 66 (p)'	BBC Report; Sky Report	Tries: Brierley 12', 48'; Lafai 38'; Macdonald 44'; Goals: Sneyd (4/5) 8 (p)', 13', 39', 45'; Sin bin: Bourouh (yellow card) 23' to 33'	Stadium: Wheldon Road; Attendance: Not given Referee: Chris Kendall

Round 8: Fri 19 April	Wigan Warriors	36–14	Castleford Tigers	Wigan
20:00 BST	Tries: French 8'; Marshall 35', 58'; Hampshire 44', 48'; Miski 72'; Goals: Keighran (2/2) 9', 36'; Smith (4/4) 45', 49', 59', 74'	BBC Report; Sky Report	Tries: L. Senior 19'; Milnes 79'; Goals: Milnes (3/3) 20', 40 (p)', 80'	Stadium: DW Stadium; Attendance: 13,029; Referee: James Vella

Round 9: Fri 26 April	Castleford Tigers	40–0	London Broncos	Castleford
20:00 BST	Tries: Miller 2'; Milnes 25'; McShane 28'; Mellor 30'; I. Senior 36', 43'; L. Senior 50'; Goals: Milnes (6/7) 3', 26', 29', 31', 38', 45'	BBC Report; Sky Report		Stadium: Wheldon Road; Attendance: 6,996; Referee: Jack Smith

Round 10: Sat 4 May	Leigh Leopards	28–28	Castleford Tigers	Leigh
17:30 BST	Tries: Moylan 27'; Ipape 37'; Charnley 40'; Leutele 52'; Lam 69'; Goals: Moylan (4/5) 29', 38', 40', 53'	BBC Report; Sky Report	Tries: L. Senior 11', 78'; Hoy 16'; Wood 61'; I. Senior 72'; Goals: Milnes (4/5) 18', 62', 73', 79'	Stadium: Leigh Sports Village; Attendance: 8,035; Referee: James Vella

Round 11: Fri 10 May	Castleford Tigers	4–60	St Helens	Castleford
20:00 BST	Tries: L. Senior 38'; Goals: Milnes (0/1); Sent off: Horne (red card) 48'	BBC Report; Sky Report	Tries: Mata'utia 4'; Lomax 24'; Welsby 42', 57'; Percival 52'; Blake 54', 72', 80'; Bell 63', 68'; Dodd 75'; Goals: Percival (8/12) 44', 49 (p)', 56', 58', 65', 69', 77', 80'; Sent off: Makinson (red card) 13'	Stadium: Wheldon Road; Attendance: 7,869; Referee: Jack Smith

Round 12: Fri 24 May	Castleford Tigers	30–22	Hull F.C.	Castleford
20:00 BST	Tries: Horne 7'; Hoy 9'; Milnes 31'; Qareqare 50'; C. Hall 55'; Goals: Milnes (5/5) 8', 10', 33', 51', 56'	BBC Report; Sky Report	Tries: Barron 23'; Sutcliffe 37'; Chan 65'; Trueman 74'; Goals: Reynolds (3/4) 24', 66', 75'	Stadium: Wheldon Road; Attendance: 8,269; Referee: Aaron Moore

Round 13: Sat 1 June	Leeds Rhinos	32–4	Castleford Tigers	Leeds
17:30 BST	Tries: Handley 10'; Croft 23'; Frawley 42'; Martin 46', 68'; Goals: Martin (6/6) 12', 25', 35 (p)', 44', 47', 70'	BBC Report; Sky Report	Tries: El-Zakhem 64'; Goals: Milnes (0/1)	Stadium: Headingley Stadium; Attendance: 14,529; Referee: Chris Kendall

Round 14: Fri 14 June	Castleford Tigers	8–10	Wigan Warriors	Castleford
20:00 BST	Tries: Hoy 33'; Goals: Milnes (2/3) 52 (p)', 59 (p)' Sin bin: Robb (yellow card) 54' to 64'	BBC Report; Sky Report	Tries: Marshall 7', 61'; Goals: Smith (1/3) 65 (p)'	Stadium: Wheldon Road; Attendance: 6,965; Referee: Ben Thaler

Round 15: Thu 20 June	Castleford Tigers	12–13	Hull Kingston Rovers	Castleford
20:00 BST	Tries: Wood 13'; Milnes 59'; Goals: Milnes (2/2) 14', 60'	BBC Report; Sky Report	Tries: Opacic 17'; Minchella 20'; Goals: Lewis (2/3) 18', 21'; Drop goals: Litten 75'	Stadium: Wheldon Road; Attendance: 7,897; Referee: Aaron Moore

Round 16: Fri 5 July	St Helens	6–8	Castleford Tigers	St Helens
20:00 BST	Tries: Royle 38'; Goals: Percival (1/2) 51 (p)'	BBC Report; Sky Report	Tries: I. Senior 55'; Goals: Milnes (2/3) 68 (p)', 72 (p)'	Stadium: Totally Wicked Stadium; Attendance: 9,808; Referee: Tom Grant

Round 17: Fri 12 July	London Broncos	20–34	Castleford Tigers	London
20:00 BST	Tries: Rourke 23'; Lovell 37'; Stock 60'; Bienek 70'; Goals: O. Leyland (2/4) 61', 71'; Sin bin: Kennedy (yellow card) 8' to 18'	BBC Report; Sky Report	Tries: Hoy 4'; I. Senior 10', 33'; Mellor 29', 53'; Milnes 55'; Goals: Milnes (5/6) 5', 11', 34', 54', 57'	Stadium: Stonebridge Road (Note: The fixture was held away from Plough Lane as the pitch was being resurfaced); Attendance: 2,050; Referee: James Vella

Round 18: Sun 21 July	Castleford Tigers	24–18	Catalans Dragons	Castleford
15:00 BST	Tries: Horne 6', 24'; Miller 15'; Hoy 72'; Goals: Milnes (4/4) 6', 16', 25', 74'	BBC Report; Sky Report	Tries: Johnstone 32'; Ikuvalu 45'; Mourgue 68'; Goals: Mourgue (3/3) 33', 46', 69'	Stadium: Wheldon Road; Attendance: 7,331; Referee: Marcus Griffiths

Round 19: Sat 27 July	Salford Red Devils	30–22	Castleford Tigers	Salford
15:00 BST	Tries: Macdonald 25'; Brierley 37'; Ryan 61'; Partington 66'; Hankinson 69'; Goals: Sneyd (5/5) 26', 38', 62', 67', 70'	BBC Report; Sky Report	Tries: Qareqare 15', 49'; El-Zakhem 56'; Johnson 72'; Goals: Milnes (3/4) 16', 50', 73'; Sin bin: Horne (yellow card) 33' to 43'; Namo (yellow card) 65' to 75'	Stadium: Salford Community Stadium; Attendance: 3,146; Referee: Chris Kendall

Round 20: Thu 1 August	Castleford Tigers	10–20	Leigh Leopards	Castleford
20:00 BST	Tries: Rooney 4'; Westerman 63'; Goals: Milnes (1/2) 65'; Sin bin: Namo (yellow card) 78' to 80'	BBC Report; Sky Report	Tries: Hardaker 23'; Charnley 31', 52'; Ipape 46'; Goals: McIntosh (0/2); Hardaker (2/3) 48', 54'	Stadium: Wheldon Road; Attendance: Not given Referee: Marcus Griffiths

Round 21: Fri 9 August	Hull Kingston Rovers	36–6	Castleford Tigers	Kingston upon Hull
20:00 BST	Tries: Hiku 10'; Burgess 16', 65'; Lewis 31'; Hall 36'; Evalds 67'; May 74'; Goals: Lewis (4/8) 17', 46 (p)', 66', 75'; Sin bin: Sue (yellow card) 51' to 61'	BBC Report; Sky Report	Tries: Mellor 6'; Goals: Milnes (1/1) 7'; Sin bin: Putt (yellow card) 42' to 52'	Stadium: Craven Park; Attendance: Not given Referee: Liam Rush

Round 22: Sun 18 August	Huddersfield Giants	20–12	Castleford Tigers	Leeds
18:30 BST	Tries: Halsall 4'; Hewitt 13'; Marsters 48'; Goals: Connor (4/4) 5', 14', 49', 76 (p)' Sin bin: Lolohea (yellow card) 23' to 33'; Rogers (yellow card) 51' to 61'	BBC Report; Sky Report	Tries: Qareqare 58', 68'; Goals: Milnes (2/2) 60', 70'	Stadium: Elland Road; Attendance: 22,293; Referee: Aaron Moore

Round 23: Fri 23 August	Castleford Tigers	6–28	Warrington Wolves	Castleford
20:00 BST	Tries: Hooley 53'; Goals: Hooley (1/1) 54'	BBC Report; Sky Report	Tries: Taylor-Wray 24'; Bateman 45'; Nicholson 64'; Ashton 73'; Thewlis 76'; Goals: Thewlis (4/6) 25', 39 (p)', 47', 78'; Sin bin: Yates (yellow card) 14' to 24'	Stadium: Wheldon Road; Attendance: 7,449; Referee: Tom Grant

Round 24: Sat 31 August	Hull F.C.	20–39	Castleford Tigers	Kingston upon Hull
15:00 BST	Tries: Sao 10'; Barron 36', 39'; Tuimavave 49'; Goals: Charles (2/4) 12', 51'; Sin bin: Aydin (yellow card) 62' to 72'	BBC Report; Sky Report	Tries: I. Senior 4'; Milnes 13'; Windley 16'; Hoy 26', 74'; Namo 67'; Goals: Milnes (7/7) 5', 15', 17', 27', 63 (p)', 68', 76'; Drop goals: Milnes 71'; Sin bin: Namo (yellow card) 47' to 57'; Horne (yellow card) 55' to 65'	Stadium: MKM Stadium; Attendance: 10,271; Referee: Liam Rush

Round 25: Fri 6 September	Castleford Tigers	12–34	Leigh Leopards	Castleford
20:00 BST	Tries: C. Hall 33'; Milnes 63'; Goals: Milnes (2/2) 34', 64'; Sin bin: Windley (yellow card) 52' to 62'	BBC Report; Sky Report	Tries: O'Donnell 8'; Charnley 14'; Amone 35', 53'; O'Brien 45'; Leutele 55'; Goals: Moylan (5/6) 9', 16', 35', 54', 57'; Sin bin: Asiata (yellow card) 61' to 71'	Stadium: Wheldon Road; Attendance: 9,053; Referee: Aaron Moore

Round 26: Fri 13 September	St Helens	40–4	Castleford Tigers	St Helens
20:00 BST	Tries: Burns 3'; Bennison 9', 26', 62'; Lomax 43'; Paasi 55'; Makinson 65'; Delaney 79'; Goals: Bennison (3/7) 4', 45', 57'; Mata'utia (1/1) 80'	BBC Report; Sky Report	Tries: Rooney 40'; Goals: Milnes (0/1)	Stadium: Totally Wicked Stadium; Attendance: 12,058; Referee: Jack Smith

Round 27: Thu 19 September	Huddersfield Giants	34–10	Castleford Tigers	Huddersfield
20:00 BST	Tries: Hewitt 18', 60'; Rushton 21'; McGowan 26'; Lolohea 37'; Clune 48'; Goals: Russell (5/6) 19', 22', 38', 49', 62'	BBC Report; Sky Report	Tries: Qareqare 55'; Mellor 73'; Goals: Milnes (1/2) 74'	Stadium: Kirklees Stadium; Attendance: 4,138; Referee: James Vella

=== League table ===
Pos	Team	Pld	W	D	L	PF	PA	PD	Pts	Qualification
1	Wigan Warriors (C)	27	22	0	5	723	338	+385	44	Advance to Semi-finals
2	Hull Kingston Rovers (Y)	27	21	0	6	719	326	+393	42	Advance to Semi-finals
3	Warrington Wolves	27	20	0	7	740	319	+421	40	Advance to Eliminators
4	Salford Red Devils	27	16	0	11	550	547	+3	32	Advance to Eliminators
5	Leigh Leopards	27	15	1	11	566	398	+168	31	Advance to Eliminators
6	St Helens	27	15	0	12	596	388	+208	30	Advance to Eliminators
7	Catalans Dragons	27	15	0	12	474	427	+47	30	
8	Leeds Rhinos	27	14	0	13	530	488	+42	28	
9	Huddersfield Giants	27	10	0	17	468	660	−192	20	
10	Castleford Tigers	27	7	1	19	425	735	−310	15	
11	Hull FC	27	3	0	24	328	894	−566	6	
12	London Broncos (R)	27	3	0	24	317	916	−599	6	Relegated to Championship

(C) Champions; (R) Relegated; (Y) Runners up

== Challenge Cup ==
As a Super League club, Castleford entered the 2024 Challenge Cup in the Sixth Round, scheduled to be played in late March. In the Sixth Round draw on 11 March, they drew the Batley Bulldogs. In the draw for the quarter-finals on 25 March, Castleford were paired against the Wigan Warriors.

Sixth round: Sat 23 March	Batley Bulldogs	14–28	Castleford Tigers	Batley
15:00 GMT	Tries: Manning 9'; Moore 32'; Goals: D. Gibbons (3/3) 10', 13 (p)', 33'	BBC Report; Sky Report	Tries: Simm 23'; Milnes 27'; I. Senior 40', 71'; McShane 43'; Miller 64'; Goals: Milnes (0/1); McShane (2/5) 28', 44'; Sin bin: Mellor (yellow card) 56' to 66'	Stadium: Mount Pleasant; Attendance: 2,015; Referee: Marcus Griffiths

Quarter-final: Sun 14 April	Castleford Tigers	6–60	Wigan Warriors	Castleford
15:00 BST	Tries: I. Senior 32'; Goals: Richardson (1/1) 34'	BBC Report; Sky Report	Tries: Marshall 4', 18', 50', 57'; O'Neill 7'; French 13'; Keighran 22'; Miski 45', 69'; Leeming 47'; Wardle 66'; Dupree 78'; Goals: Smith (6/12) 8', 15', 20', 23', 49', 80'	Stadium: Wheldon Road; Attendance: 4,097; Referee: Liam Moore

== Player statistics ==
=== Summary ===
Appearances and points in all competitions
No	Player	App	T	G	DG	Pts	Temporarily suspended	Sent off (straight red)
1	(England) Luke Hooley	11	1	3	0	10	0	0
2	(England) Josh Simm	7	5	0	0	20	0	0
3	(England) Jack Broadbent	10	1	0	0	4	0	0
4	(England) Sam Wood	16	3	0	0	12	0	0
5	(Ireland) Innes Senior	29	17	0	0	68	0	0
6	(England) Danny Richardson	5	0	11	0	22	0	0
7	(Australia) Jacob Miller	26	3	0	0	12	0	0
8	(England) Liam Watts	22	0	0	0	0	0	1
9	(England) Paul McShane	11	2	2	0	12	0	0
10	(England) George Lawler	15	0	0	0	0	0	0
11	(Lebanon) Elie El-Zakhem	26	2	0	0	8	0	0
12	(England) Alex Mellor	26	5	0	0	20	1	0
13	(England) Joe Westerman	26	3	0	0	12	0	0
14	(Papua New Guinea) Liam Horne	27	4	0	0	16	2	1
15	(England) George Griffin	9	0	0	0	0	0	0
16	(England) Rowan Milnes	24	8	51	1	135	0	0
17	(Papua New Guinea) Nixon Putt	7	0	0	0	0	1	0
18	(England) Josh Hodson	5	0	0	0	0	0	0
19	(England) Sam Hall	15	1	0	0	4	0	0
20	(Nigeria) Muizz Mustapha	14	0	0	0	0	0	0
21	(Papua New Guinea) Sylvester Namo	15	1	0	0	4	3	0
22	(Lebanon) Charbel Tasipale	6	0	0	0	0	0	0
23	(Fiji) Jason Qareqare	17	6	0	0	24	0	0
24	(England) Cain Robb	18	0	0	0	0	1	0
25	(England) Brad Martin	10	1	0	0	4	0	0
26	(Democratic Republic of the Congo) Samy Kibula	6	0	0	0	0	0	0
27	(Tonga) Albert Vete	4	0	0	0	0	0	0
28	(England) Will Tate	3	0	0	0	0	0	0
29	(England) George Hill	13	0	0	0	0	0	0
30	(Jamaica) Luis Johnson	10	1	0	0	4	0	0
31	(England) Fletcher Rooney	3	2	0	0	8	0	0
32	(England) Dan Hindmarsh	8	0	0	0	0	0	0
33	(Ireland) Louis Senior	4	5	0	0	20	0	0
34	(Australia) Tex Hoy	17	7	0	0	28	0	0
35	(England) Corey Hall	14	2	0	0	8	0	0
36	(England) Sam Eseh	1	0	0	0	0	0	0
37	(England) Matty English	4	0	0	0	0	0	0
38	(England) Jenson Windley	5	1	0	0	4	1	0
39	(Estonia) Akim Matvejev	2	0	0	0	0	0	0

Source: RLRKC – Castleford Tigers 2024

=== Appearances ===
Positions key:
FB = Fullback	RW = Right wing	RC = Right centre	LC = Left centre	LW = Left wing	SO = Stand-off	SH = Scrum half
PR = Prop	HK = Hooker	SR = Second row	LF = Loose forward	R = Replacement	18 = 18th man	(* = Non-playing)

Appearances and positions in each fixture
No	Player	SL					CC	SL		CC	SL																			
No	Player	1	2	3	4	5	R6	6	7	QF	8	9	10	11	12	13	14	15	16	17	18	19	20	21	22	23	24	25	26	27
1	(England) Luke Hooley	FB	FB	FB	FB	R	R					18*			18*											RC	RC	RC	RC	RC
2	(England) Josh Simm	R		RW	RW	RW	RW	RW	RW																					
3	(England) Jack Broadbent	RC	RC	RC	R	FB	FB	FB	FB	FB	FB																			
4	(England) Sam Wood	LC	LC	LC	LC	LC		LC	LC	LC	LC	LC	LC	LC	LC	LC	LC	LC												
5	(Ireland) Innes Senior	LW	LW	LW	LW	LW	LW	LW	LW	LW	LW	LW	LW	LW	LW	LW	LW	LW	LW	LW	LW	LW	LW	LW	LW	LW	LW	LW	LW	LW
6	(England) Danny Richardson	SO	SO				18*	SO	SO	SO	18*																			
7	(Australia) Jacob Miller	SH	SH	SH	SH	SH	SH	SH	SH	SH	SH	SH	SH	SH		SH	SH	SH	SH	SH	SH	SH	SH	SH	SH	SH			SH	SH
8	(England) Liam Watts	R					R	PR	PR		PR	PR	PR	PR	R	R	PR		R	R	R		R	PR	R	PR	PR	PR	PR	R
9	(England) Paul McShane						HK	HK				HK	HK	HK	SH											R	R	HK	HK	HK
10	(England) George Lawler	PR	PR	PR	PR	PR		PR											SR	SR	SR	SR	HK				R	R	SR	SR
11	(Lebanon) Elie El-Zakhem	SR	SR	SR				SR	SR	SR	SR	SR	SR	SR	SR	SR	SR	SR	SR	SR	SR	SR	SR	SR	SR	SR	SR	SR	SR	SR
12	(England) Alex Mellor			SR	RC	SR	LC	SR	SR	SR		SR	SR	SR	SR	SR	SR	SR	LC	LC	LC	LC	LC	LC	SR	SR	SR	SR	LC	LC
13	(England) Joe Westerman	LF	LF	LF	LF	LF	PR	LF	LF	LF		PR	PR	PR	LF	LF		PR	LF	LF	LF	LF	PR	LF	LF	PR	PR	PR		PR
14	(Papua New Guinea) Liam Horne	HK	HK	HK	HK	HK	LF	R	HK	HK	HK	R	R	R	HK	HK	HK	HK	HK	HK	HK	HK		HK	HK	HK	HK		LF	LF
15	(England) George Griffin												18*	R	PR	PR	PR	PR	PR	PR	PR	PR								
16	(England) Rowan Milnes		R	SO	SO	SO	SO				SO	SO	SO	SO	SO	SO	SO	SO	SO	SO	SO	SO	SO	SO	SO	18*	SO	SO	SO	SO
17	(Papua New Guinea) Nixon Putt	PR	PR	R	R											R	R							SR						
18	(England) Josh Hodson						RC	RC	RC	RW	RC				R*			18*												
19	(England) Sam Hall	R	R	R	R	PR	PR	R	PR		PR	R	R		PR	PR	18*	R		18*	18*	R								
20	(Nigeria) Muizz Mustapha	R	R	PR															PR	PR	PR	PR	PR	PR	PR		R	R	PR	R
21	(Papua New Guinea) Sylvester Namo				PR				R	R					R	R	R	R			R	R	R	R	R	R	R			R
22	(Lebanon) Charbel Tasipale	SR	SR		SR	RC				RC	SR																			
23	(Fiji) Jason Qareqare	RW	RW												RW	RW	RW	RW	RW	RW	RW	RW		RW	RW	RW	RW	RW	RW	RW
24	(England) Cain Robb	18*	18*		18*	R	R	18*	R	R	R	R	R	R		R	R	R	R	R	R	R	R	R			18*	R		
25	(England) Brad Martin			18*		SR	SR		R	R	R	R	R	18											R				R	18*
26	(Democratic Republic of the Congo) Samy Kibula		R	R		R			R	PR	R																			
27	(Tonga) Albert Vete				R	R	R	R																						
28	(England) Will Tate																								LC	LC	LC			
29	(England) George Hill					18*				18*	LF	LF	LF	LF	R	18*	LF	LF	R*			18*	LF	R	R	LF	LF	LF	18*	
30	(Jamaica) Luis Johnson			R	SR		SR	R*	18*	PR									18*	R	R	R	SR	RC	18*	R				
31	(England) Fletcher Rooney																						RW	18*				18*	FB	FB
32	(England) Dan Hindmarsh									R	R												R	R	PR	R		R	R	
33	(Ireland) Louis Senior										RW	RW	RW	RW																
34	(Australia) Tex Hoy											FB	FB	FB	FB	FB	FB	FB	FB	FB	FB	FB	FB	FB	FB	FB	FB	FB		
35	(England) Corey Hall											RC	RC	RC	RC	RC	RC	RC	RC	RC	RC	RC	RC		RC			LC		
36	(England) Sam Eseh													R																
37	(England) Matty English																R	R	R	R										
38	(England) Jenson Windley																						18*			SO	SH	SH	R	R
39	(Estonia) Akim Matvejev																												R	PR

Sources: RLRKC – Castleford Tigers 2024 & RLP – Castleford Tigers 2024
