= Fletcher Rooney =

English rugby league footballer

Personal information
- Full name: Fletcher Rooney
- Born: 12 January 2006 (age 20) West Yorkshire, England

Playing information
- Position: Fullback
Club
Years	Team	Pld	T	G	FG	P
2023–	Castleford Tigers	13	4	0	0	16
- Source: As of 21 February 2026
- Father: Jamie Rooney

Fletcher Rooney (born 12 January 2006) is an English professional rugby league footballer who plays as a fullback for the Castleford Tigers in the Super League.

== Background ==
Rooney was born in West Yorkshire, England. He is the son of former England international rugby league footballer Jamie Rooney.

Rooney played junior rugby league for Featherstone Lions and Lock Lane ARLFC. He joined the Castleford Tigers development system at scholarship level. He overcame an ACL injury at the age of 14.

In September 2022, Rooney progressed to Castleford's academy squad. During the 2023 academy season, he made 11 appearances and scored 10 tries and 1 goal, as well as a further 5 appearances and 1 try at Reserves level, and was named Academy Player of the Year.

Rooney represented Yorkshire in their Academy Origin fixture against Lancashire on 19 August 2023. He played as a centre in the 44–16 defeat at Warrington's Halliwell Jones Stadium.

== Playing career ==
=== Castleford Tigers ===
In September 2023, Rooney was introduced into first-team training with the Castleford senior squad, and was assigned squad number 47. On 22 September, aged 17, he made his Super League debut for Castleford Tigers against Leeds Rhinos in the final round of the season. His performance in defeat earned praise from head coaches Danny Ward and Rohan Smith, as well as the travelling fans. Rooney said of his debut, "All my life I've been working towards that moment, it was a big thing for me and my family." He became the first 2006-born player to feature in the Super League.

Ahead of the 2024 season, Rooney was included in Castleford's listed first-team squad in October 2023, one of only two fullbacks alongside Luke Hooley. He would be following a hybrid programme between the academy and first-team environments to support his development. In December 2023, it was announced that Rooney had signed his first professional contract with Castleford, agreeing a three-year deal. He required surgery for an ankle injury suffered in January, which prevented him filling in for the injured Hooley before the Tigers signed Tex Hoy. On 1 August, playing as a winger, Rooney made his second senior appearance and scored his first Super League try in Castleford's home loss to Leigh. He scored a second try on 13 September against St Helens in his third appearance.

Rooney began the 2025 season starting at fullback for Castleford, owing to Hoy covering halfback for the injured Rowan Milnes. His strong performances, particularly against Hull Kingston Rovers in round 1, drew praise from head coach Danny McGuire who said, "He will be a superstar once we've finished with him." He subsequently signed a new five-year contract with Castleford in February, and said, "I've worked hard at every level to be where I am today and I'm ambitious about the future." In March, Rooney's impressive start to the season was cut short by a high-grade quadriceps injury suffered in training, expected to rule him out for around four months.

== Statistics ==
Appearances and points in all competitions by year
Club	Season	Tier	App	T	G	DG	Pts
Castleford Tigers	2023	Super League	1	0	0	0	0
Castleford Tigers	2024	Super League	3	2	0	0	8
Castleford Tigers	2025	Super League	8	2	0	0	8
Castleford Tigers	2026	Super League	1	0	0	0	0
Castleford Tigers	2027	Super League	0	0	0	0	0
Career total			13	4	0	0	16

As of match played 21 February 2026
