= Sylvester Namo =

PNG international rugby league footballer

Personal information
- Born: 26 August 2000 (age 26) Goroka, Papua New Guinea
- Height: 178 cm (5 ft 10 in)
- Weight: 108 kg (17 st 0 lb)

Playing information
- Position: Prop
Club
Years	Team	Pld	T	G	FG	P
2024–25	Castleford Tigers	22	2	0	0	8
2024(DR)	→ Newcastle Thunder	1	0	0	0	0
	Total	23	2	0	0	8
Representative
Years	Team	Pld	T	G	FG	P
2022–	Papua New Guinea	10	4	0	0	16
2022–26	PNG Prime Minister's XIII	4	1	0	0	4
- Source: As of 17 October 2026

Sylvester Namo (born 26 August 2000) is a Papua New Guinean professional rugby league footballer who plays as a prop forward for the Brisbane Tigers in the Queensland Cup and Papua New Guinea at international level.

He represents Papua New Guinea at international level and played at the 2021 Rugby League World Cup. He has previously played for the PNG Hunters and Townsville Blackhawks in the Queensland Cup. He has spent time on dual registration from Castleford at Newcastle Thunder in League 1.

== Background ==
Born in Goroka, Papua New Guinea, Namo began playing rugby league for the KK Brothers Vikings in 2019 at Mt. Hagen where he was raised.

== Playing career ==
=== Lae Snax Tigers ===
In 2020, Namo made his debut for the Lae Snax Tigers in the Digicel Cup, scoring a try in their Grand Final loss to the Hela Wigmen.

=== PNG Hunters ===
In 2021, Namo joined the PNG Hunters, playing 13 games for the club in the Queensland Cup. In 2022, he played 16 games, starting all 16 at prop.

=== North Queensland Cowboys ===
In November 2022, Namo joined the North Queensland Cowboys on a train and replacement contract for the 2023 season.

=== Castleford Tigers ===
On 1 October 2023, it was announced that Namo would join the Castleford Tigers in the Super League on a two-year contract from 2024. He made his debut on 8 March against Huddersfield, with coach Craig Lingard managing his minutes as he returned from an ACL injury. In April, Namo was given a five-match ban for dangerous contact against Wigan, with Castleford unsuccessful in their appeal against the ruling. He made his return to the team on 24 May against Hull FC, earning praise from Lingard for an impactful performance.

On 23 April 2025, Castleford announced that Namo had left the club with immediate effect.

=== Brisbane Tigers ===
On 5 May 2025 it was reported that he had joined the Brisbane Tigers in the Queensland Cup

=== International ===
On 25 June 2022, he made his international debut for Papua New Guinea in their 24-14 victory over Fiji in the 2022 Pacific Test. In October 2022, he represented Papua New Guinea at the 2021 Rugby League World Cup, playing three games.

On 12 October 2025 he played for the PNG Prime Minister's XIII in the 28-10 defeat to Australia’s Prime Minister's XIII in Port Moresby

He played for PNG Prime Minister's XIII on 3 October 2026 in the 10-60 defeat to Prime Minister's XIII in Port Moresby, scoring a try in 67'.
