= George Hill (rugby league) =

English rugby league footballer (born 2004)

Personal information
- Full name: George Hill
- Born: 29 July 2004 (age 22) Sheffield, South Yorkshire, England
- Height: 5 ft 10 in (1.78 m)
- Weight: 14 st 7 lb (92 kg)

Playing information
- Position: Loose forward, Hooker
Club
Years	Team	Pld	T	G	FG	P
2023–	Castleford Tigers	20	0	0	0	0
2023(loan)	→ Whitehaven	10	1	0	0	4
2024(loan)	→ Whitehaven	2	0	0	0	0
2024(DR)	→ Batley Bulldogs	1	0	0	0	0
2025(loan)	→ Salford Red Devils	7	0	0	0	0
2026(loan)	→ Keighley Cougars	3	3	0	0	0
	Total	43	4	0	0	4
Representative
Years	Team	Pld	T	G	FG	P
2026	United States	1	0	0	0	0
- Source: As of 18 October 2026

George Hill (born 29 July 2004) is an English professional rugby league footballer who plays as a loose forward or hooker for the Castleford Tigers in the Super League.

He has previously spent time on loan or dual registration from Castleford at Whitehaven and the Batley Bulldogs in the Championship, and at the Salford Red Devils in the Super League.

== Background ==
Hill was born in Sheffield, South Yorkshire, England.

Hill played junior rugby league for North Derbyshire Chargers and Sheffield Hawks ARLFC. He switched to playing rugby union after enrolling on a college programme with the Doncaster Knights. Aged 16, he crossed codes back to rugby league and began playing for Doncaster Toll Bar in their open age team.

He joined the Castleford Tigers academy in 2022 after a successful trial, aged 18.

== Playing career ==
=== Castleford Tigers ===
Hill progressed into the Castleford Tigers first team squad for the 2023 season, and was assigned squad number 34. He did not register any senior appearances that year, although was named as 18th man against Hull F.C. in the Challenge Cup on 21 May.

Hill made his Super League debut for Castleford against the Wigan Warriors on 19 April 2024. Head coach Craig Lingard said, "I thought he was exceptional in that first half," and said that, "it was testament to his attitude, his performance and his fitness," to play 40 minutes at loose forward. Hill maintained his place in the first team over the following weeks, and in May it was announced that he signed a three-year contract extension with Castleford, with an option for a fourth year.

==== Whitehaven (loan) ====
In July 2023, Hill joined Whitehaven in the Championship on a rolling loan from Castleford. He remained there until the end of the season and made ten appearances. He scored one try against Newcastle.

Hill returned to Whitehaven on loan in March 2024. He made a further two appearances before being recalled to Castleford in April due to mounting injuries in the squad.

==== Batley Bulldogs (DR) ====
Hill played for the Batley Bulldogs in the Championship during the 2024 season, through their dual registration arrangement with Castleford.

==== Salford Red Devils (loan) ====
On 25 March 2025, Castleford announced that Hill would join Salford Red Devils in the Super League on a one-month loan. The move was part of the deal to sign Brad Singleton from Salford, who were operating under a restricted salary cap.

==== Keighley Cougars (loan) ====
Hill moved to Keighley on a season long loan at the end of January 2026.

=== International ===
He made his international debut for United States, playing at second-row, in their 44-12 defeat to Wales on 17 October 2026 at The Wern, Merthyr Tydfil.

== Statistics ==
Appearances and points in all competitions by year
Club	Season	Tier	App	T	G	DG	Pts
Castleford Tigers	2024	Super League	13	0	0	0	0
Castleford Tigers	2025	Super League	7	0	0	0	0
Castleford Tigers	Total		20	0	0	0	0
→ Whitehaven (loan)	2023	Championship	10	1	0	0	4
→ Whitehaven (loan)	2024	Championship	2	0	0	0	0
→ Whitehaven (loan)	Total		12	1	0	0	4
→ Batley Bulldogs (DR)	2024	Championship	1	0	0	0	0
→ Salford Red Devils (loan)	2025	Super League	7	0	0	0	0
→ Keighley Cougars (loan)	2026	Championship	0	0	0	0	0
Career total			40	1	0	0	4

As of match played 19 September 2025
