= Samy Kibula =

Congolese rugby league footballer (born 1999)

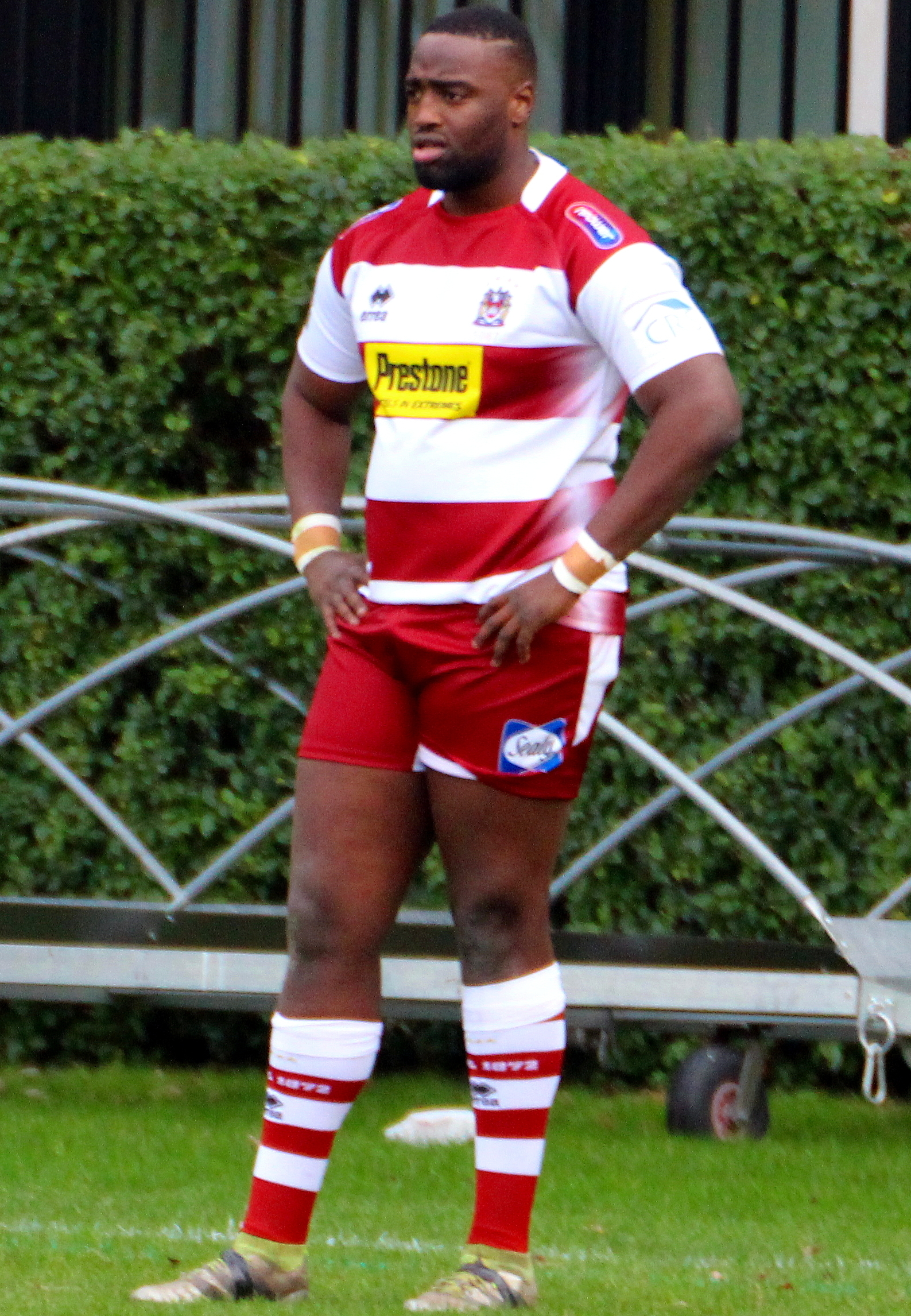

Personal information
- Full name: Samuel Kibula
- Born: 7 August 1999 (age 27) Kinshasa, DR Congo
- Height: 6 ft 4 in (1.93 m)
- Weight: 17 st 3 lb (109 kg)

Playing information
- Position: Prop
Club
Years	Team	Pld	T	G	FG	P
2018–19	Wigan Warriors	1	0	0	0	0
2018(loan)	→ Swinton Lions	1	0	0	0	0
2018(DR)	→ London Skolars	2	2	0	0	8
2019(loan)	→ Dewsbury Rams	12	2	0	0	8
2019(loan)	→ Swinton Lions	11	2	0	0	8
2020–21	Warrington Wolves	2	0	0	0	0
2021(loan)	→ Newcastle Thunder	0	0	0	0	0
2022	Bradford Bulls	15	2	0	0	8
2022(loan)	→ Dewsbury Rams	2	1	0	0	4
2023	Batley Bulldogs	19	5	0	0	20
2023(loan)	→ Oldham	4	1	0	0	4
2024	Castleford Tigers	6	0	0	0	0
2024(DR)	→ Batley Bulldogs	6	0	0	0	0
2024(loan)	→ Featherstone Rovers	3	0	0	0	0
2025	Batley Bulldogs	3	0	0	0	0
2026	Swinton Lions	13	4	0	0	16
2027–	Rochdale Hornets	0	0	0	0	0
	Total	100	19	0	0	76
- Source: As of 6 October 2026

Samy Kibula (born 7 August 1999) is a Congolese professional rugby league footballer who plays as a prop forward for the Rochdale Hornets in the RFL Championship.

He has previously played for the Wigan Warriors, the Warrington Wolves and the Castleford Tigers in the Super League, and for the Bradford Bulls and the Batley Bulldogs in the RFL Championship. He has spent time on loan at the Swinton Lions, the Dewsbury Rams and Featherstone Rovers in the Championship, and at the London Skolars and Oldham in League 1.

== Background ==
Kibula was born in Kinshasa, Democratic Republic of the Congo to a Congolese father and South African mother. Aged 2, his family moved to the United Kingdom, settling in Wigan and later Tyldesley.

Growing up, Kibula played junior rugby union for Leigh RUFC and Sale Sharks and rugby league for Leigh Miners Rangers. He joined the Wigan Warriors youth system, winning two Academy Grand Finals in 2017 and 2018.

== Playing career ==
=== Wigan Warriors ===
On 12 July 2018, Kibula made his Super League début for the Wigan Warriors against the Huddersfield Giants.

==== Swinton Lions (loan) ====
Kibula joined the Swinton Lions in the RFL Championship on loan at the start of the 2018 season. On 18 February, he made his professional debut for Swinton against the Batley Bulldogs.

In June 2019, Swinton announced the return of Kibula on a month-long loan deal, which was later extended until the end of the season. He made 11 appearances in his second stint at the club, scoring tries against Bradford and Widnes.

==== London Skolars (DR) ====
Kibula made two appearances for the London Skolars in League 1 during the 2018 season, through their dual registration agreement with Wigan. On 23 June, he scored two tries against the North Wales Crusaders.

==== Dewsbury Rams (loan) ====
Kibula joined the Dewsbury Rams in the Championship on loan at the start of the 2019 season. He was sent off, but avoided suspension, for a "minor" altercation after conceding a try to Swinton. He made 12 appearances, scoring tries against Featherstone and Thatto Heath, before departing in June.

=== Warrington Wolves ===
In September 2019, the Warrington Wolves announced the signing of Kibula on a one-year deal ahead of the 2020 season. His younger brother Ambrose was already on the club's scholarship system. He made his Warrington debut on 30 August against Wakefield Trinity.

==== Newcastle Thunder (loan) ====
On 20 December 2020, it was announced that Kibula would join the Newcastle Thunder in the Championship on a season-long loan. However, in March, he suffered a ruptured Achilles in training, forcing him to miss the entirety of the season.

=== Bradford Bulls ===
On 4 October 2021, the Bradford Bulls announced the signing of Kibula on a one-year deal for the 2022 Championship season. In his sole season at the club, he made 14 appearances and scored tries against Dewsbury and Halifax.

==== Dewsbury Rams (loan) ====
In May 2022, Kibula joined the Dewsbury on a two-week loan deal for his second spell with the Rams. He made two appearances and scored a try against Featherstone.

=== Batley Bulldogs ===
On 18 November 2022, it was announced that Kibula had signed for the Batley Bulldogs for the 2023 season. He featured in Batley's 1895 Cup final defeat against the Halifax Panthers at Wembley. He made a total of 19 appearances, his highest tally yet in a first-grade season, and scored three tries against Keighley, Halifax and Barrow. Head coach Craig Lingard later said, "last season he really developed at Batley and turned out to be a standout player there."

==== Oldham (loan) ====
In May 2023, Kibula joined League 1 side Oldham on a one-month loan deal. He made four appearances for the Roughyeds and scored one try.

=== Castleford Tigers ===
On 19 October 2023, the Castleford Tigers announced the signing of Kibula. He would join on a one-year deal for 2024, with an option for a further year. This move would see him return to a full-time environment and follow former coach Craig Lingard, who had been appointed the new head coach at Castleford.

Kibula made his Castleford debut on 25 February against the Salford Red Devils in round 2 of the 2024 season.

==== Batley Bulldogs (DR) ====
Kibula featured for his former club Batley in the 2024 Championship through their dual registration partnership with Castleford, making six appearances.

==== Featherstone Rovers (loan) ====
On 26 July 2024, it was announced that he had signed for Featherstone Rovers in the RFL Championship on season-long loan.

=== Return to Batley ===
On 31 October 2024, Kibula rejoined Batley in the RFL Championship. He featured in the Bulldogs' opening three games of 2025 before suffering a serious knee injury against Oldham in February, ruling him out for the entire year. In November 2025, it was confirmed that he had departed the club at the conclusion of the season.

=== Swinton Lions ===
On 26 December 2025, Kibula signed for his former loan side Swinton Lions on permanent terms for the 2026 Championship season.

=== Rochdale Hornets ===
On 28 September 2026 it was reported that he had signed for Rochdale Hornets in the RFL Championship

== Club statistics ==
Appearances and points in all competitions by year
Club	Season	Tier	App	T	G	DG	Pts
Wigan Warriors	2018	Super League	1	0	0	0	0
→ London Skolars (DR)	2018	League One	2	2	0	0	8
→ Dewsbury Rams (loan)	2019	Championship	12	2	0	0	8
→ Dewsbury Rams (loan)	2022 (Note: Rejoined on loan from Bradford in 2022)	Championship	2	1	0	0	4
→ Dewsbury Rams (loan)	Total		14	3	0	0	12
Warrington Wolves	2020	Super League	2	0	0	0	0
→ Newcastle Thunder (loan)	2021	Championship	0	0	0	0	0
Bradford Bulls	2022	Championship	15	2	0	0	8
Batley Bulldogs	2023	Championship	19	5	0	0	20
Batley Bulldogs	2024 (Note: Rejoined on dual registration from Castleford in 2024)	Championship	6	0	0	0	0
Batley Bulldogs	2025	Championship	3	0	0	0	0
Batley Bulldogs	Total		28	3	0	0	12
→ Oldham (loan)	2023	League One	4	1	0	0	4
Castleford Tigers	2024	Super League	6	0	0	0	0
→ Featherstone Rovers (loan)	2024	Championship	3	0	0	0	0
Swinton Lions	2018 (Note: On loan from Wigan in 2018 and 2019 before joining permanently in 2026)	Championship	1	0	0	0	0
Swinton Lions	2019	Championship	11	2	0	0	8
Swinton Lions	2026	Championship	13	4	0	0	16
Swinton Lions	Total		25	6	0	0	24
Rochdale Hornets	2027	Championship	0	0	0	0	0
Career total			100	19	0	0	76

As of match played 23 February 2025
