= Elie El-Zakhem =

Lebanon international rugby league footballer

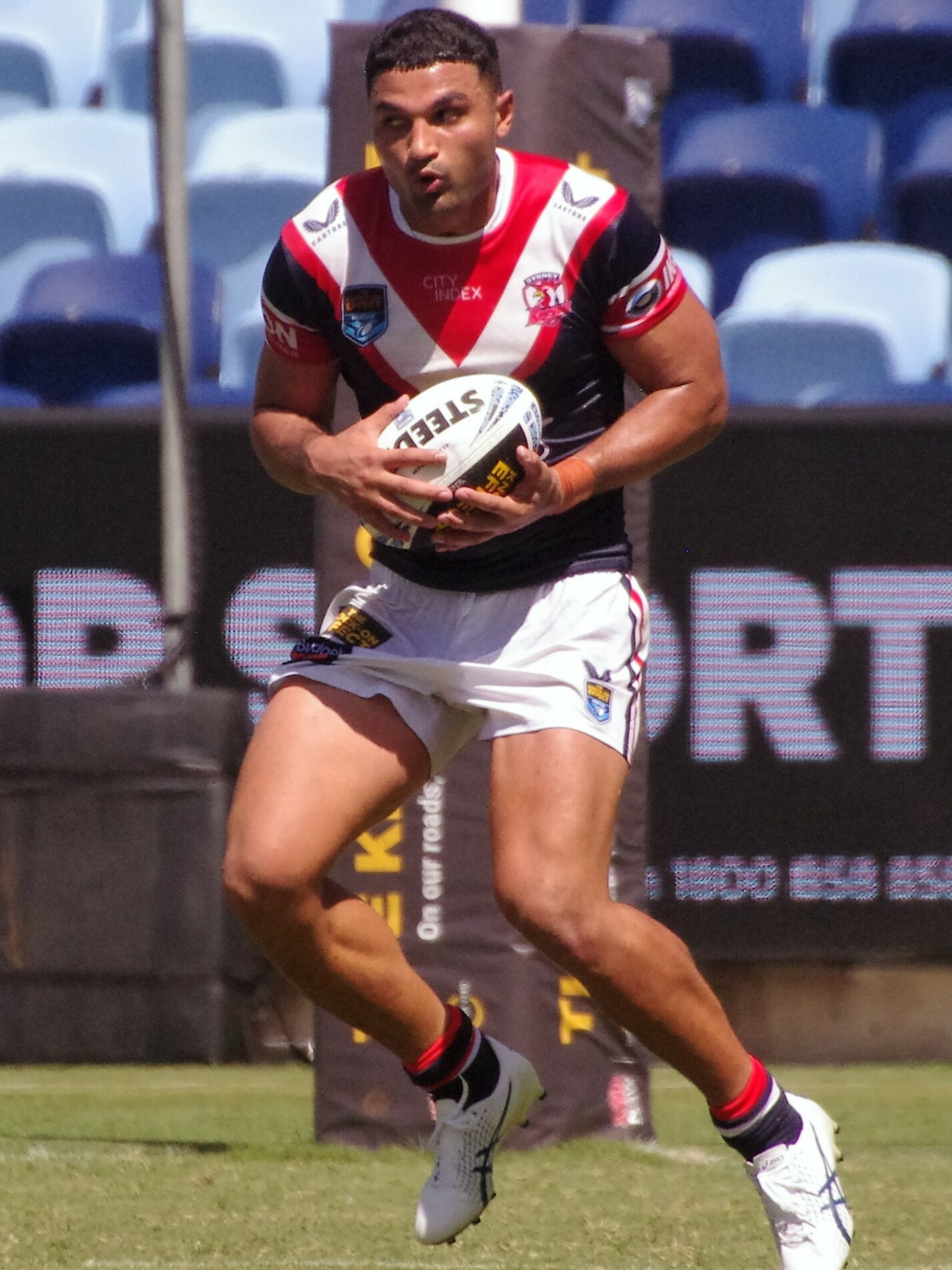

Personal information
- Full name: Elie El-Zakhem
- Born: 17 April 1998 (age 28) Merrylands, New South Wales, Australia
- Height: 192 cm (6 ft 4 in)
- Weight: 103 kg (16 st 3 lb)

Playing information
- Position: Second-row, Lock
Club
Years	Team	Pld	T	G	FG	P
2024	Castleford Tigers	26	2	0	0	8
Representative
Years	Team	Pld	T	G	FG	P
2019–	Lebanon	6	2	0	0	8
2019	Lebanon 9s	3	0	0	0	0
- Source: As of 7 October 2024

Elie El-Zakhem is a Lebanon international rugby league footballer who plays as a second-row forward for the Western Suburbs Magpies in the NSW Cup.

He has previously played for the Canterbury Bulldogs, the Parramatta Eels, the Sydney Roosters and the North Sydney Bears in the NSW Cup.

== Club career ==
=== North Sydney Bears ===
On 24 September 2023, El-Zakhem played for North Sydney in their 2023 NSW Cup grand final loss against South Sydney.

=== Castleford Tigers ===
On 29 September 2023, the Castleford Tigers announced the signing of El-Zakhem on a two-year deal from the 2024 Super League season. He would be joining his Lebanon teammate Charbel Tasipale at the Tigers upon recommendation from former Castleford player Jordan Rankin.

El-Zakhem was assigned squad number 11 ahead of the 2024 season. He made his Super League debut for Castleford in round 1 against the Wigan Warriors.

=== Mackay Cutters ===
On 23 November 2024 it was reported that he would join Mackay Cutters in the Queensland Cup for the 2025 season. He underwent pre-season training with the North Queensland Cowboys before returning to Sydney to join the Western Suburbs Magpies in the NSW Cup.

== International career ==
El-Zakhem made his international debut for Lebanon in their 56-14 loss to Fiji in the 2019 Pacific Test.

In September 2022, El-Zakhem was named in the Lebanon squad for the 2021 Rugby League World Cup. He featured in every game for the Cedars, making 4 appearances and scoring 2 tries.
