= Jenson Windley =

English rugby league footballer

Personal information
- Full name: Jenson Windley
- Born: 18 August 2006 (age 20) Kingston upon Hull, East Yorkshire, England

Playing information
- Position: Scrum-half, Stand-off, Fullback
Club
Years	Team	Pld	T	G	FG	P
2024–	Castleford Tigers	12	2	0	0	8
2025(loan)	→ Sheffield Eagles	6	2	0	0	8
2026(loan)	→ Salford RLFC	3	0	0	0	0
2026(loan)	→ Halifax Panthers	1	0	0	0	0
2026(loan)	→ Widnes Vikings	0	0	0	0	0
	Total	22	4	0	0	16
- Source: As of 15 September 2026

Jenson Windley (born August 2006) is an English professional rugby league footballer who plays as a scrum-half, stand-off or fullback for Castleford Tigers in the Super League.

He has previously spent time on loan at Sheffield Eagles, Salford RLFC and Halifax Panthers in the RFL Championship.

== Background ==
Windley was born in Kingston upon Hull, East Yorkshire, England.

Windley played junior rugby league for West Hull ARLFC. He joined the Castleford Tigers development system at scholarship level.

In September 2022, Windley progressed to Castleford's academy squad. During the 2023 academy season, he made ten appearances and scored nine tries. In 2024, he served as academy captain and made eleven appearances and scored nine tries, as well as a further eight appearances and five tries for the reserves.

== Playing career ==
=== Castleford Tigers ===
In April 2024, Windley signed a two-year contract with the Castleford Tigers alongside nine academy teammates. He was selected as 18th man against Leigh on 1 August and assigned squad number 38. On 23 August, Windley made his Super League debut for Castleford against the Warrington Wolves. He was voted Man of the Match and praised by supporters and team captain Joe Westerman. The following week, in his second appearance, Windley scored his first try in Castleford's win against Hull FC. He maintained his place in the first team for the final rounds of the season; he was sin-binned against Leigh in round 25, and also deputised at hooker and loose forward.

==== Sheffield Eagles (loan) ====
On 29 May 2025, it was announced that Windley would join Sheffield Eagles in the Championship on a one-month loan deal. He scored a try on debut against York Knights, and was named player of the match against Doncaster. At the end of June, his loan deal was extended until the end of the season. In round 18 against London Broncos, Windley scored a try in another player-of-the-match performance, which proved to be his final appearance before being recalled by Castleford.

==== Salford RLFC (loan) ====
On 26 February 2026, Windley joined Salford RLFC in the Championship on a week-to-week loan deal. He made two appearances for Salford before his recall to Castleford in March. On 7 May, Windley re-joined Salford on another rolling loan, though suffered a head injury in his first game back.

==== Halifax Panthers (loan) ====
On 2 July 2026, Windley joined Halifax Panthers in the Championship on a one-month loan deal. After just one week, he was recalled by Castleford.

=== Widnes Vikings (loan) ===
On 25 August 2026 it was reported that he had signed for Widnes Vikings in the RFL Championship on one-week loan

== Statistics ==
Appearances and points in all competitions by year
Club	Season	Tier	App	T	G	DG	Pts
Castleford Tigers	2024	Super League	5	1	0	0	4
Castleford Tigers	2025	Super League	3	1	0	0	4
Castleford Tigers	2026	Super League	4	0	0	0	0
Castleford Tigers	Total		12	2	0	0	8
→ Sheffield Eagles (loan)	2025	Championship	6	2	0	0	8
→ Salford RLFC (loan)	2026	Championship	3	0	0	0	0
→ Halifax Panthers (loan)	2026	Championship	1	0	0	0	0
→ Widnes Vikings (loan)	2026	Championship	0	0	0	0	0
Career total			22	4	0	0	16

As of match played 7 August 2026
