= Luis Johnson =

English rugby league footballer

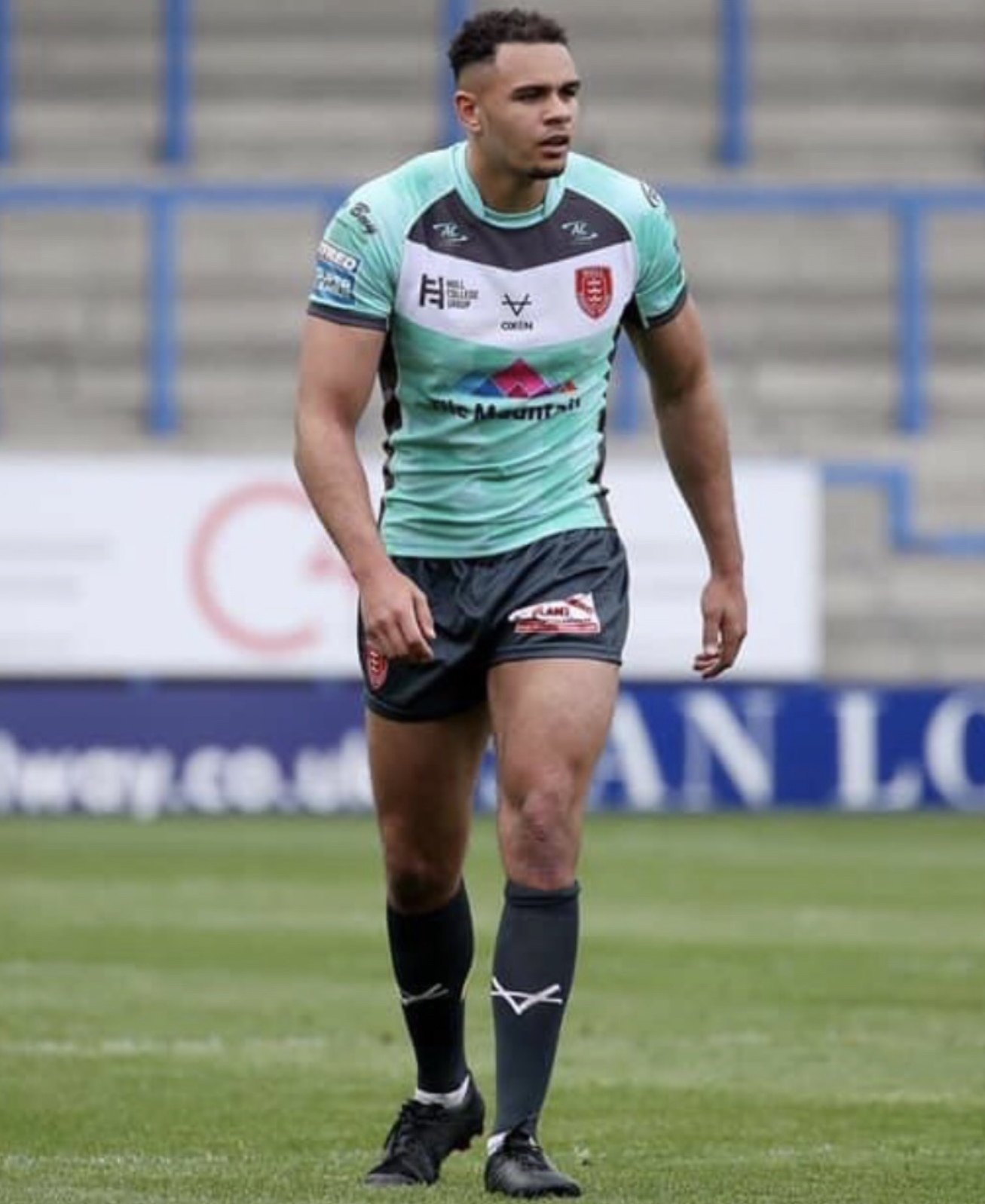

Personal information
- Full name: Luis Adam Johnson
- Born: 20 February 1999 (age 26) Leeds, West Yorkshire, England
- Height: 6 ft 3 in (1.91 m)
- Weight: 15 st 6 lb (98 kg)

Playing information
- Position: Second-row
Club
Years	Team	Pld	T	G	FG	P
2018–20	Warrington Wolves	9	0	0	0	0
2018(DR)	→ Rochdale Hornets	3	0	0	0	0
2019(DR)	→ Rochdale Hornets	10	0	0	0	0
2019(loan)	→ Widnes Vikings	1	0	0	0	0
2019(loan)	→ Hull Kingston Rovers	4	0	0	0	0
2021–23	Hull Kingston Rovers	29	2	0	0	8
2022(DR)	→ Dewsbury Rams	1	0	0	0	0
2023(loan)	→ Castleford Tigers	3	0	0	0	0
2024	Castleford Tigers	10	1	0	0	4
2024(loan)	→ Featherstone Rovers	2	0	0	0	0
2025–	Doncaster RLFC	5	0	0	0	0
	Total	77	3	0	0	12
- Source: As of 27 October 2025

Luis Johnson (born 20 February 1999) is a professional rugby league footballer who plays as a second-row forward for Doncaster RLFC in the RFL Championship.

He has previously played for Warrington Wolves, Hull Kingston Rovers and Castleford Tigers in the Super League. He has spent time on loan and dual registration at Rochdale Hornets, Widnes Vikings, Dewsbury Rams and Featherstone Rovers in the Championship.

== Background ==
Johnson was born in Leeds, West Yorkshire, England and is of English and Jamaican descent.

He started his amateur career at Oulton Raiders in Leeds at 4 years of age and was selected by the Castleford Tigers at 15 years old to join their scholarship programme. He went on to their academy programme but, in 2018, the Warrington Wolves bought him out of his contract for £45,000 and Johnson signed a 3-year deal to join the club.

== Career ==
=== Warrington Wolves ===
In 2018, Johnson made his Super League début for the Warrington Wolves against the Wigan Warriors.

Johnson spent time on dual registration with the Rochdale Hornets, and on loan at the Widnes Vikings and Hull KR.

=== Hull Kingston Rovers ===
On 10 December 2020, Hull Kingston Rovers announced that Johnson would join on a permanent basis, signing a one-year deal. This was part of a swap deal that would see Robbie Mulhern move the other way and join Warrington.

In June 2021, Johnson signed a two-year contract extension with Hull KR. In September 2021, Johnson played for Hull KR in their 28-10 semi-final loss against the Catalans Dragons as they fell one game short of the grand final.

In October 2023, Hull KR confirmed that Johnson would depart the club following the expiry of his contract at the end of the season.

==== Castleford Tigers (loan) ====
In April 2023, Johnson re-joined his former academy club Castleford Tigers on a season-long loan. After two weeks, he would be available for recall by Hull KR in the event of significant injury problems. Johnson made his Castleford debut on 6 April against Wakefield Trinity and went on to make a total of 3 appearances for the Tigers. In May, Hull KR exercised their recall clause and cut the loan short due to injury concerns throughout the squad.

=== Castleford Tigers ===
On 18 December 2023, Castleford Tigers announced the signing of Johnson on a one-year deal.

==== Featherstone Rovers (loan) ====
On 13 June 2024, it was announced that Johnson had signed for Featherstone Rovers in the Championship on a short-term loan.

=== Doncaster RLFC ===
On 22 July 2025, it was announced that he would join Doncaster RLFC in the Championship.

== Statistics ==
Appearances and points in all competitions by year
Club	Season	Tier	App	T	G	DG	Pts
Warrington Wolves	2018	Super League	1	0	0	0	0
Warrington Wolves	2019	Super League	2	0	0	0	0
Warrington Wolves	2020	Super League	6	0	0	0	0
Warrington Wolves	Total		9	0	0	0	0
→ Rochdale Hornets (DR)	2018	Championship	3	0	0	0	0
→ Rochdale Hornets (DR)	2019	Championship	10	0	0	0	0
→ Rochdale Hornets (DR)	Total		13	0	0	0	0
→ Widnes Vikings (loan)	2019	Championship	1	0	0	0	0
Hull Kingston Rovers	2019 (Note: On loan from Warrington in 2019 before joining permanently in 2021)	Super League	4	0	0	0	0
Hull Kingston Rovers	2021	Super League	20	1	0	0	4
Hull Kingston Rovers	2022	Super League	4	0	0	0	0
Hull Kingston Rovers	2023	Super League	5	1	0	0	4
Hull Kingston Rovers	Total		33	2	0	0	8
→ Dewsbury Rams (DR)	2022	Championship	1	0	0	0	0
Castleford Tigers	2023 (Note: On loan from Hull KR in 2023 before joining permanently in 2024)	Super League	3	0	0	0	0
Castleford Tigers	2024	Super League	10	1	0	0	4
Castleford Tigers	Total		13	1	0	0	4
→ Featherstone Rovers (loan)	2024	Championship	2	0	0	0	0
Doncaster RLFC	2025	Championship	0	0	0	0	0
Career total			72	3	0	0	12

As of match played 23 August 2024
