= Akim Matvejev =

Estonian rugby league footballer (born 2006)

Personal information
- Full name: Akim Matvejev
- Born: 29 June 2006 (age 20) Tallinn, Estonia
- Height: 6 ft 3 in (1.91 m)

Playing information
- Position: Prop
Club
Years	Team	Pld	T	G	FG	P
2024–	Castleford Tigers	2	0	0	0	0
2025(loan)	→ Rochdale Hornets	1	0	0	0	0
2025(loan)	→ Workington Town	1	0	0	0	0
2026(loan)	→ Batley Bulldogs	10	3	0	0	12
	Total	14	3	0	0	12
- Source: As of 6 June 2026

Akim Matvejev (born 29 June 2006) is an Estonian professional rugby league footballer who plays as a prop forward for the Castleford Tigers in the Super League.

He has previously spent time on loan at Rochdale Hornets and Workington Town in RFL League One, and at Batley Bulldogs in the RFL Championship.

== Background ==
Matvejev was born in Tallinn, Estonia. He moved with his family to England in 2012.

He studied at Bruntcliffe Academy and Leeds College of Building.

Matvejev took up rugby league aged 12 and played at junior level for Drighlington ARLFC. He joined the Castleford Tigers development system at scholarship level.

== Playing career ==
=== Castleford Tigers ===
In April 2024, Matvejev signed a two-year contract with Castleford Tigers alongside nine academy teammates. He was first named in the senior 21-man squad to face Leigh on 1 August and assigned squad number 39, although did not feature. On 13 September, Matvejev made his Super League debut for Castleford against St Helens as an interchange. In doing so, he became the first Estonian to play in the Super League. He made his first senior start the following week against Huddersfield in the final round of the season.

==== Rochdale Hornets (loan) ====
On 7 August 2025, Matvejev joined Rochdale Hornets in RFL League One on loan for the remainder of the season.

==== Batley Bulldogs (loan) ====
On 28 January 2026, it was announced that Matvejev would join Batley Bulldogs in the RFL Championship on a season-long loan for 2026. He scored his first professional try for Batley on 26 April against Goole Vikings, powering through the middle of the defence.
