= Ivor Lingard =

English rugby league footballer

Personal information
- Full name: Ivor Lingard
- Born: 1942 (age 83–84) Lower Agbrigg district, Wakefield, England

Playing information
- Height: 5 ft 7 in (1.70 m)
- Weight: 10 st 7 lb (67 kg)
- Position: Stand-off, Scrum-half
Club
Years	Team	Pld	T	G	FG	P
1961–64	Featherstone Rovers	69	20	0	0	60
1964–70	Parramatta Eels	104	20	1	8	78
	Total	173	40	1	8	138
- Relatives: Craig Lingard (First cousin once removed)

Ivor Lingard (birth registered first quarter of 1942) is an English former professional rugby league footballer who played in the 1960s and 1970s, and coached in the 1970s. He played at club level for Featherstone Rovers and the Parramatta Eels, as a stand-off or scrum-half, and coached at Parramatta Eels (Under-23s in 1975).

== Playing career ==
=== Club career ===
Lingard made his début for Featherstone Rovers on Wednesday 19 April 1961, and he played his last match for Featherstone during the 1963–64 season. Lingard would then sign with Parramatta in the NSWRL competition, reaching 104 appearances.

=== County Cup Final ===
Lingard played at stand-off in Featherstone Rovers' 0–10 defeat by Halifax in the 1963–64 Yorkshire Cup Final.

== Personal life ==
Lingard's birth was registered in Lower Agbrigg district, Wakefield, West Riding of Yorkshire, England. He is married to Sandra Lingard; they have three children named Steven, Sean and Louise Lingard. He has six grandchildren.

Lingard is the first cousin once removed of the rugby league footballer Craig Lingard.
