= Innes Senior =

Ireland international rugby league footballer

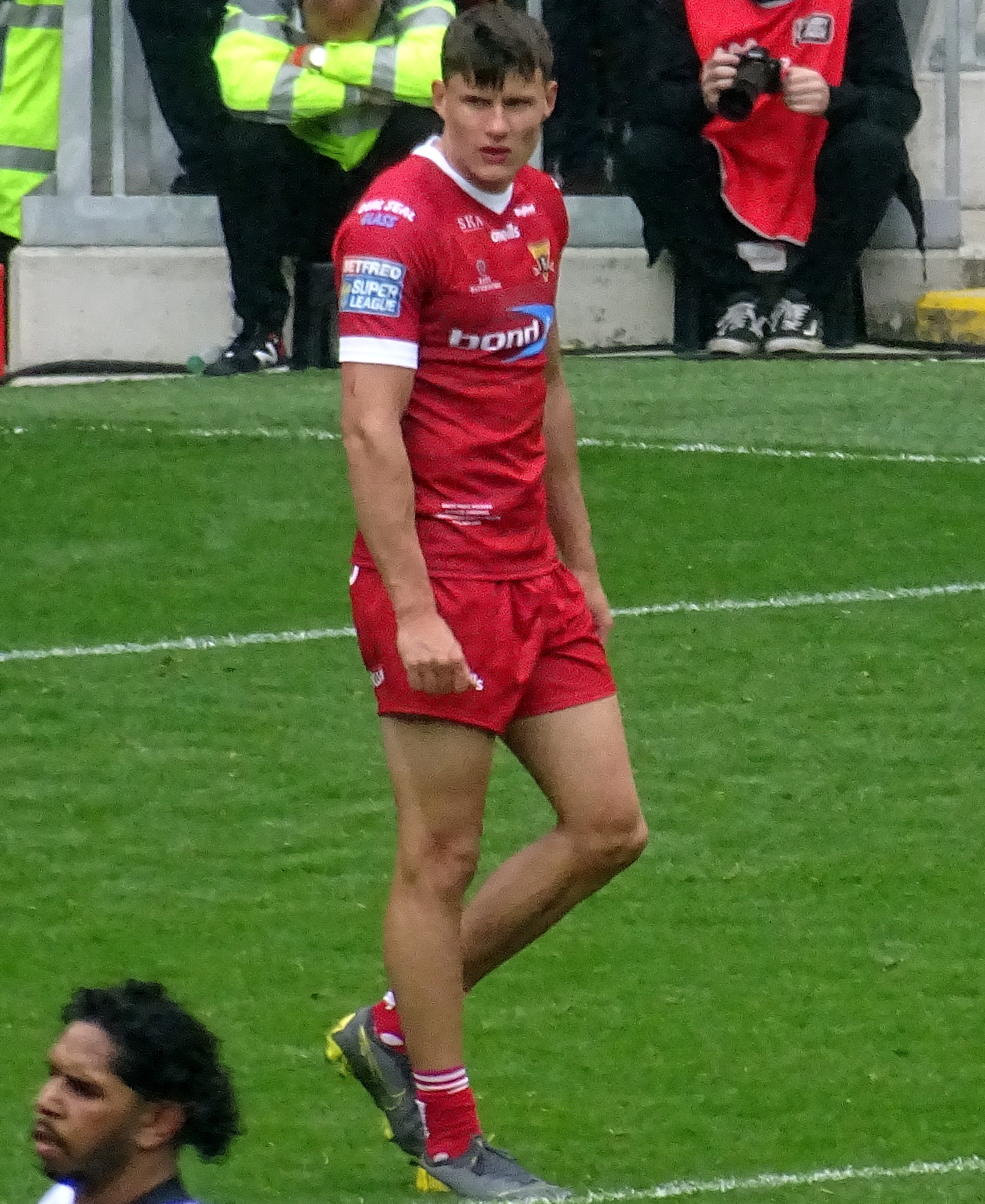

Personal information
- Born: 30 May 2000 (age 25) Huddersfield, West Yorkshire, England
- Height: 6 ft 4 in (1.94 m)
- Weight: 16 st 1 lb (102 kg)

Playing information
- Position: Wing
Club
| Years | Team | Pld | T | G | FG | P |
|---|---|---|---|---|---|---|
| 2018–24 | Huddersfield Giants | 58 | 22 | 0 | 0 | 88 |
| 2019(loan) | → Workington Town | 1 | 0 | 0 | 0 | 0 |
| 2020(loan) | → Wakefield Trinity | 8 | 4 | 0 | 0 | 16 |
| 2021(loan) | → Wakefield Trinity | 16 | 6 | 0 | 0 | 24 |
| 2023(loan) | → Wakefield Trinity | 8 | 5 | 0 | 0 | 20 |
| 2024(loan) | → Castleford Tigers | 29 | 17 | 0 | 0 | 68 |
| 2025 | Castleford Tigers | 16 | 7 | 0 | 0 | 28 |
| 2026– | Leigh Leopards | 0 | 0 | 0 | 0 | 0 |
| | Total | 136 | 61 | 0 | 0 | 244 |
Representative
| Years | Team | Pld | T | G | FG | P |
| 2022– | Ireland | 3 | 1 | 0 | 0 | 4 |
- Source: As of 18 October 2025
- Relatives: Louis Senior (brother)

Innes Senior (born 30 May 2000) is an Ireland international rugby league footballer who plays as a winger for the Leigh Leopards in the Super League.

He has previously played for Huddersfield Giants and Castleford Tigers in the Super League. He has spent time on loan at Wakefield Trinity in the Super League and at Workington Town in League 1.

== Background ==
Senior was born in Huddersfield, West Yorkshire, England.

Along with his twin brother Louis, Innes is a product of the Giants' academy system and both made their first team debuts over Easter 2018.

== Career ==
=== Huddersfield Giants ===
In 2018, he made his Super League début for the Huddersfield Giants against the Catalans Dragons. His twin brother Louis had made his début in the previous game against Leeds.

Senior became the first player born in or after the year 2000 to score in the Super League when he scored a try for the Huddersfield club against Castleford in April 2018.

On 28 May 2022, Senior played for Huddersfield in their 2022 Challenge Cup Final loss to Wigan.

Senior was limited to only six games with Huddersfield in the 2023 Super League season as the club finished ninth on the table and missed the playoffs.

==== Wakefield Trinity (loan) ====
On 17 December 2020, it was announced that Wakefield Trinity and Huddersfield had agreed to extend Senior's loan period to cover the 2021 season.

In round 20 of the 2023 Super League season, Senior scored four tries for Wakefield Trinity as they upset Warrington 42-6.

==== Castleford Tigers (loan) ====
On 11 October 2023, it was announced that Senior would join Castleford Tigers on a season-long loan for the 2024 season, in a swap deal with Elliot Wallis. He was assigned squad number 5 and scored four tries during pre-season. He made his Castleford debut in round 1 against Wigan Warriors, and scored his first try in round 3 against Warrington Wolves. In round 4, Senior scored two tries against his parent club Huddersfield, and in round 7, he scored four tries against Salford Red Devils. In May, Innes signed a two-year deal to remain with Castleford from the 2025 season alongside his twin brother Louis, who had also joined Castleford on loan a month prior. He finished the season as Castleford's top tryscorer with 17 tries, in addition to playing every minute of every game.

=== Castleford Tigers ===
Senior remained at Castleford for the 2025 season having signed a two-year deal in May 2024. He scored his first try of the campaign away at Leeds Rhinos in round 3 with a 75-metre break down the touchline. In round 6 against Hull, Senior was controversially sin-binned for adjudged head contact with Cade Cust and received a two-match ban. He made his return from suspension against former club Huddersfield, scoring two tries in a man-of-the-match display.

On 9 October 2025, it was announced that Senior had left Castleford Tigers one year early ahead of a subsequent transfer to Leigh Leopards.

=== Leigh Leopards ===
On 18 October 2025 it was reported that he had signed a 2-year deal to join Leigh Leopards for 2026

== Club statistics ==
Appearances and points in all competitions by year
| Club | Season | Tier | App | T | G | DG | Pts |
|---|---|---|---|---|---|---|---|
| Huddersfield Giants | 2018 | Super League | 8 | 4 | 0 | 0 | 16 |
| Huddersfield Giants | 2019 | Super League | 18 | 4 | 0 | 0 | 16 |
| Huddersfield Giants | 2022 | Super League | 26 | 12 | 0 | 0 | 48 |
| Huddersfield Giants | 2023 | Super League | 6 | 2 | 0 | 0 | 8 |
| Huddersfield Giants | Total | | 58 | 22 | 0 | 0 | 88 |
| → Workington Town (loan) | 2019 | League 1 | 1 | 0 | 0 | 0 | 0 |
| → Wakefield Trinity (loan) | 2020 | Super League | 8 | 4 | 0 | 0 | 16 |
| → Wakefield Trinity (loan) | 2021 | Super League | 16 | 6 | 0 | 0 | 24 |
| → Wakefield Trinity (loan) | 2023 | Super League | 8 | 5 | 0 | 0 | 20 |
| → Wakefield Trinity (loan) | Total | | 32 | 15 | 0 | 0 | 60 |
| Castleford Tigers | 2024 (Note: On loan from Huddersfield in 2024 before joining permanently in 2025) | Super League | 29 | 17 | 0 | 0 | 68 |
| Castleford Tigers | 2025 | Super League | 16 | 7 | 0 | 0 | 28 |
| Castleford Tigers | Total | | 45 | 24 | 0 | 0 | 96 |
| Leigh Leopards | 2026 | Super League | 0 | 0 | 0 | 0 | 0 |
| Leigh Leopards | Total | | 0 | 0 | 0 | 0 | 0 |
| Career total | | | 136 | 61 | 0 | 0 | 244 |

As of match played 20 July 2025
