= Liam Horne =

PNG international rugby league footballer

Personal information
- Full name: Liam Shandy Robert Horne
- Born: 3 February 1998 (age 28) Port Moresby, National Capital District, Papua New Guinea
- Height: 5 ft 11 in (1.80 m)
- Weight: 14 st 0 lb (89 kg)

Playing information
- Position: Hooker, Loose forward
Club
Years	Team	Pld	T	G	FG	P
2019–23	Norths Devils	48	16	0	0	64
2021	Central Queensland Capras	3	0	0	0	0
2023–25	Castleford Tigers	51	7	0	0	28
2026–	Leigh Leopards	29	2	0	0	8
	Total	131	25	0	0	100
Representative
Years	Team	Pld	T	G	FG	P
2022–	Papua New Guinea	7	0	0	0	0
2024–25	PNG Prime Minister's XIII	2	0	0	0	0
- Source: As of 30 October 2026

Liam Horne (born 3 February 1998) is a Papua New Guinea professional rugby league footballer who plays as a hooker or loose forward for the Leigh Leopards in the Super League and Papua New Guinea at international level.

He has previously played for Castleford Tigers in the Super League, and for the Norths Devils and Central Queensland Capras in the Queensland Cup.

== Early life ==
Horne was born in Port Moresby, Papua New Guinea.

== Playing career ==
=== Castleford Tigers ===
On 24 July 2023, the Castleford Tigers announced the signing of Horne on a one-and-a-half-year deal, with an option for a further year. He made his Super League debut for the Tigers on 4 August against Huddersfield. His performance against Wakefield Trinity in his second game for Castleford saw him voted Fans' Man of the Match and named in the Super League Team of the Week.

Horne was assigned squad number 14 ahead of the 2024 season. He was voted Fans' Man of the Match in the round 1 defeat against the Wigan Warriors, and scored his first Castleford try in round 2 against the Salford Red Devils. In May, Horne signed a two-year contract extension with the Tigers. In round 18, he scored two tries and was voted Man of the Match in a win against Catalans. At Castleford's end-of-season awards, Horne was named Players' Player of the Year.

=== Leigh Leopards ===
On 24 October 2025, Horne signed for Leigh Leopards in the Super League having been released from Castleford.

== Representative ==
Horne made his international debut for Papua New Guinea in their 24–14 victory over Fiji in the 2022 Pacific Test.

On 12 October 2025 he played for the PNG Prime Minister's XIII in the 28-10 defeat to Australia’s Prime Minister's XIII in Port Moresby

== Club statistics ==
Appearances and points in all competitions by year
Club	Season	Tier	App	T	G	DG	Pts
Norths Devils	2019	Queensland Cup	3	0	0	0	0
Norths Devils	2020	Queensland Cup	1	0	0	0	0
Norths Devils	2021	Queensland Cup	8	2	0	0	8
Norths Devils	2022	Queensland Cup	22	5	0	0	20
Norths Devils	2023	Queensland Cup	14	9	0	0	36
Norths Devils	Total		48	16	0	0	64
CQ Capras	2021	Queensland Cup	3	0	0	0	0
Castleford Tigers	2023	Super League	5	0	0	0	0
Castleford Tigers	2024	Super League	27	4	0	0	16
Castleford Tigers	2025	Super League	19	3	0	0	12
Castleford Tigers	Total		51	7	0	0	28
Leigh Leopards	2026	Super League	29	2	0	0	8
Leigh Leopards	2027	Super League	0	0	0	0	0
Leigh Leopards	Total		29	2	0	0	8
Career total			131	25	0	0	100

As of match played 19 September 2025
