= Luke Hooley =

English rugby league player

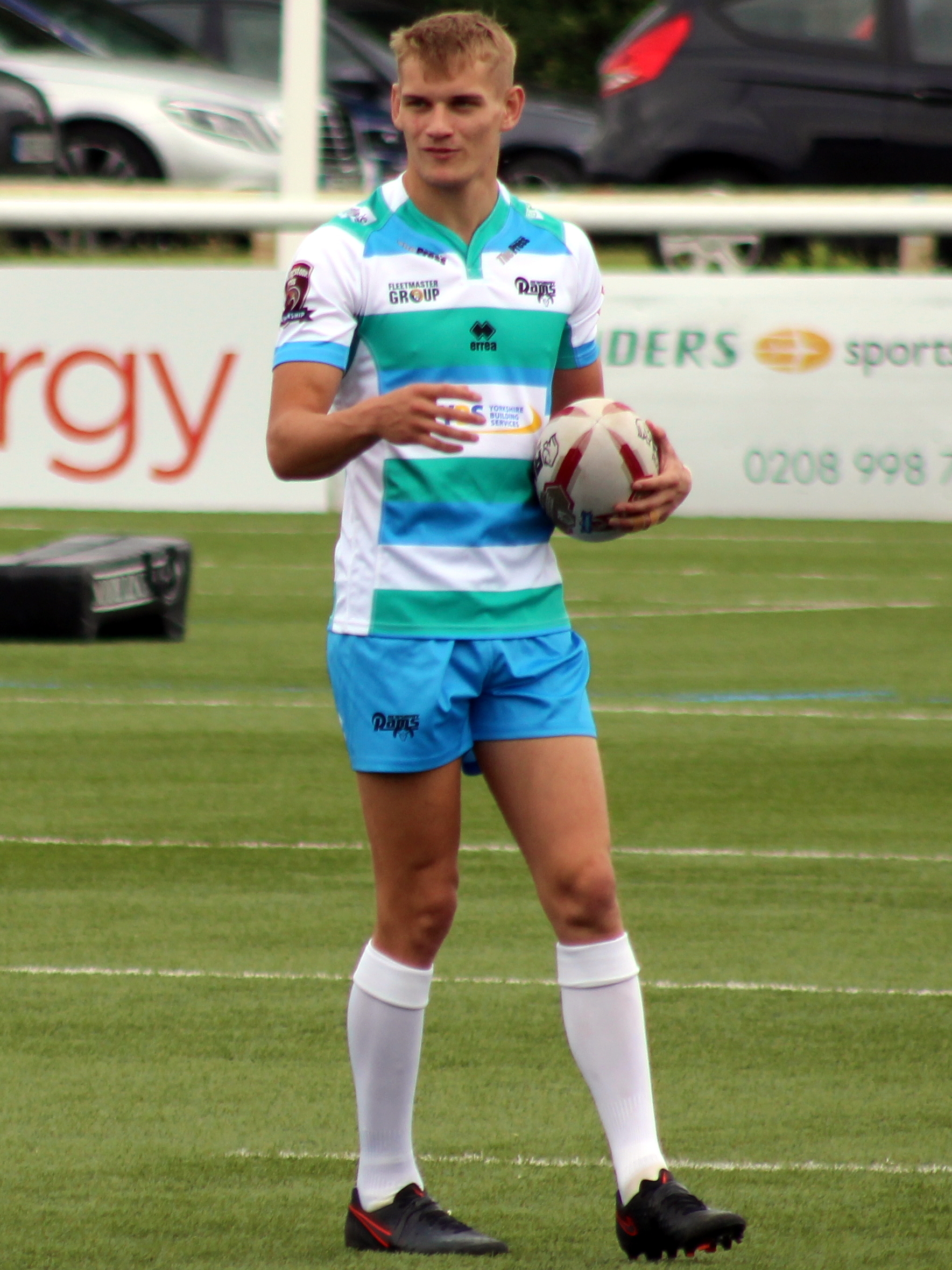

Personal information
- Born: 1 August 1998 (age 27) Dewsbury, West Yorkshire, England
- Height: 6 ft 1 in (1.86 m)
- Weight: 14 st 7 lb (92 kg)

Playing information
- Position: Fullback
Club
| Years | Team | Pld | T | G | FG | P |
|---|---|---|---|---|---|---|
| 2017–19 | Wakefield Trinity | 0 | 0 | 0 | 0 | 0 |
| 2017 (loan) | → Dewsbury Rams | 6 | 0 | 0 | 0 | 0 |
| 2017–19 (loan) | → Oldham RLFC | 22 | 10 | 25 | 0 | 90 |
| 2019 (loan) | → Dewsbury Rams | 13 | 2 | 0 | 0 | 8 |
| 2020–22 | Batley Bulldogs | 56 | 30 | 33 | 0 | 186 |
| 2023 | Leeds Rhinos | 8 | 4 | 0 | 0 | 16 |
| 2023 (loan) | → Batley Bulldogs | 10 | 3 | 28 | 0 | 68 |
| 2024–25 | Castleford Tigers | 11 | 1 | 3 | 0 | 10 |
| 2024 (loan) | → Featherstone Rovers | 1 | 0 | 6 | 0 | 12 |
| 2024 (DR) | → Batley Bulldogs | 12 | 6 | 2 | 1 | 29 |
| 2025 (loan) | → Bradford Bulls | 21 | 9 | 63 | 0 | 162 |
| 2026– | Bradford Bulls | 3 | 0 | 3 | 0 | 6 |
| | Total | 163 | 65 | 163 | 1 | 587 |
- Source: As of 23 September 2025

Luke Hooley (born 1 August 1998) is an English rugby league footballer who plays as a fullback for the Bradford Bulls in the Super League.

He has previously played for the Leeds Rhinos in the Super League and the Batley Bulldogs in the RFL Championship. He has spent time on loan or dual registration at Dewsbury, Oldham and Featherstone in the Championship and at Oldham in League 1.

== Playing career ==
=== Early career ===
Hooley played junior rugby league for Dewsbury Moor before joining the Bradford Bulls Academy in 2014, aged 16. He played for the first team in a pre-season friendly against Castleford Tigers in January 2016.

=== Wakefield Trinity ===
When Bradford entered administration, he moved to Wakefield Trinity in March 2017.

While at Wakefield, Hooley spent time on loan at Dewsbury Rams and Oldham.

=== Batley Bulldogs ===
After being released by Wakefield, he joined Batley Bulldogs ahead of the 2020 season. He helped the club reach the 2022 Championship Grand Final, which they lost to Leigh Centurions.

=== Leeds Rhinos ===
In October 2022, Hooley signed a two-year deal with Leeds Rhinos. He missed the start of the 2023 season due to requiring surgery on an ankle injury suffered in training, eventually making his Super League debut in March 2023 in a 12–20 defeat against Hull Kingston Rovers.

==== Batley Bulldogs (loan) ====
He spent time on loan at former club Batley during the 2023 season, and was given permission by Leeds to play for the club in the 1895 Cup final against Halifax Panthers. Halifax won the match 12–10, with Hooley missing a difficult conversion following a last-minute Batley try, which would have taken the final into extra time.

=== Castleford Tigers ===
On 5 October 2023, it was announced that Hooley would join the Castleford Tigers from the 2024 season, signing on a two-year deal. He made his Castleford debut in round 1 against the Wigan Warriors.

==== Featherstone Rovers (loan) ====
On 3 May 2024, it was announced that Hooley would join Featherstone Rovers in the RFL Championship on a two-week loan deal from Castleford. In his sole appearance at the club, he kicked six goals for the Rovers.

==== Batley Bulldogs (DR) ====
Hooley returned to his former club Batley again in 2024 through their dual registration agreement with Castleford. From May to August, he made eleven appearances and scored six tries, two goals and one drop goal.

==== Bradford Bulls (loan) ====
On 12 March 2025 he signed for Bradford Bulls in the RFL Championship on loan

=== Bradford Bulls ===
On 23 September 2025 he signed for Bradford Bulls in the RFL Championship on a 2-year deal.
