= Tex Hoy =

Australian rugby league footballer

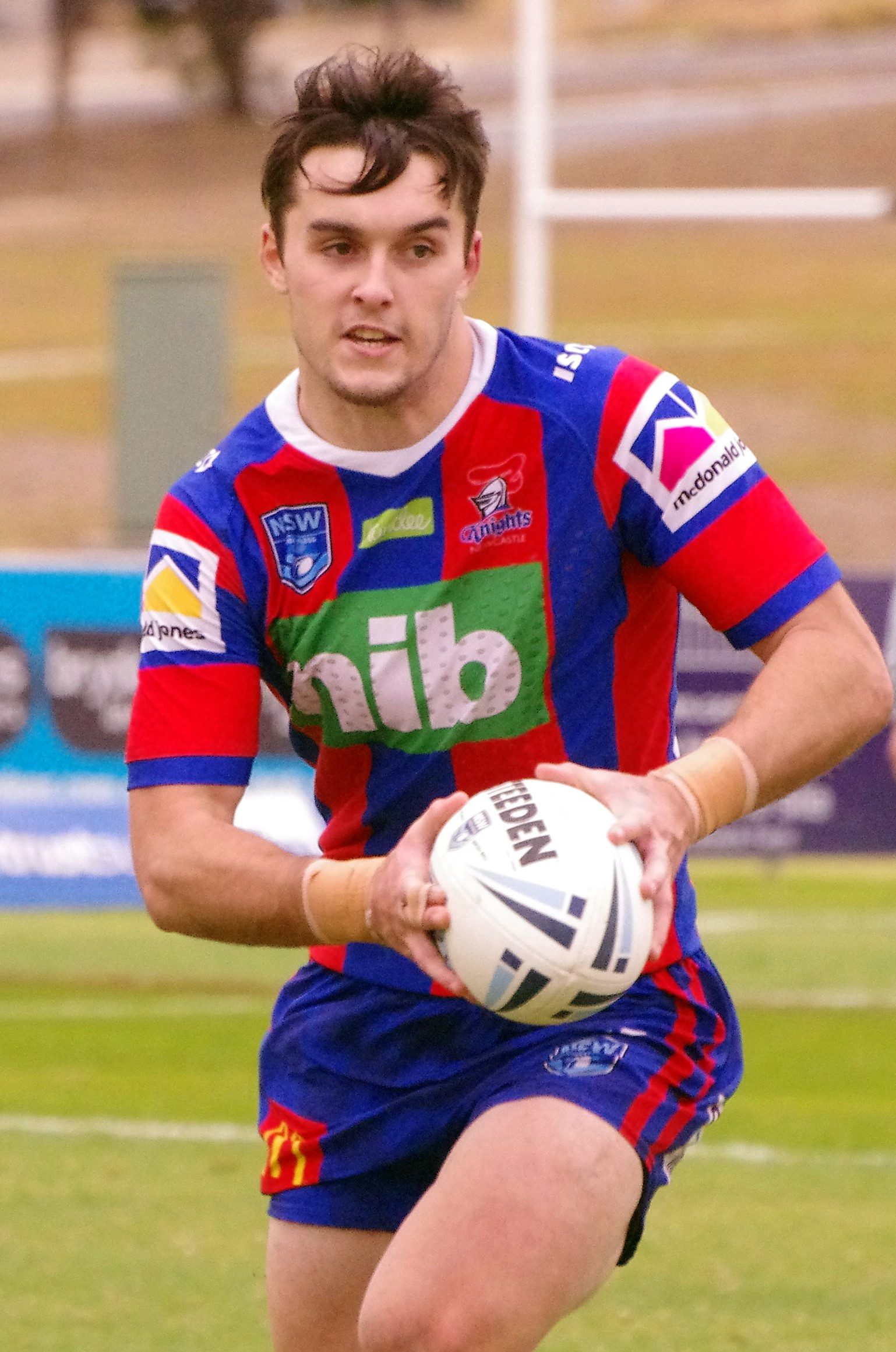

Personal information
- Born: 4 November 1999 (age 26) Newcastle, New South Wales, Australia
- Height: 184 cm (6 ft 0 in)
- Weight: 91 kg (14 st 5 lb)

Playing information
- Position: Fullback, Stand-off
Club
Years	Team	Pld	T	G	FG	P
2020–22	Newcastle Knights	29	5	15	0	50
2023–24	Hull FC	24	3	2	0	16
2024–25	Castleford Tigers	35	13	20	0	92
	Total	88	21	37	0	158
- Source: As of 23 September 2026

Tex Hoy (born 4 November 1999) is an Australian professional rugby league footballer who most recently played as a fullback or stand-off for Castleford Tigers in the Super League.

He has previously played for the Newcastle Knights in the National Rugby League and for Hull F.C. in the Super League.

== Background ==
Born in Newcastle, New South Wales, Hoy played his junior rugby league for the South Newcastle Lions, before being signed by the Newcastle Knights.

Hoy is the son of former semi-professional surfer Matt Hoy.

== Playing career ==
=== Early years ===
Hoy started playing for the Knights' Harold Matthews Cup team in 2015, the S. G. Ball Cup side in 2016 and then the Jersey Flegg Cup team in 2018. In 2019, he played the majority of the year with the Knights' Canterbury Cup NSW team. In July 2019, he extended his contract with the Knights until the end of the 2021 season, before playing for the New South Wales Under-20's rugby league team.

=== 2020 ===
In February, Hoy was promoted to the Knights' top 30 NRL squad. In round 3 of the 2020 NRL season, he made his NRL debut for the Knights against the Penrith Panthers.

=== 2022 ===
In July, Hoy signed a two-year contract with English Super League side Hull F.C. starting in 2023.

=== 2023 ===
Hoy made his club debut for Hull F.C. in round 1 of the 2023 Super League season against Castleford which ended in a 32-30 victory. Hoy played a total of 17 games for Hull F.C. in the Super League XXVIII season as the club finished 10th on the table.

=== 2024 ===
On 12 April, Hoy departed Hull F.C. with immediate effect. It came the day before Tony Smith was sacked as head coach. Hull F.C. had started the season with only one win from seven games.

On 20 April, it was confirmed that Hoy had joined the Castleford Tigers until the end of the 2024 season. He made his club debut on 26 April against London and was voted Fans Man of the Match, and he scored his first try for Castleford on 4 May against Leigh. In June, Hoy agreed a contract to remain with the Tigers for a further two years.

=== 2025 ===
Hoy began the year playing at halfback and scored a try against Bradford in his first competitive match of the 2025 season. He also scored his first two goals for the Tigers, although missed a last-second conversion to level the scores, deputising for injured goalkicker Rowan Milnes.

Hoy reverted back to fullback from round 5, and scored a try against Hull F.C. in round 6 directly from a line break inside his own half. In round 11 against Salford in May, Hoy scored a hat-trick of tries and had a hand in three more of Castleford's scores. He played a total of eighteen matches in the 2025 season, finishing as Castleford's top pointscorer as the club finished 11th on the table.

In November, Castleford confirmed that Hoy had left the club to pursue playing opportunities elsewhere. He subsequently returned to Australia.

=== 2026 ===
In February, it was revealed that Hoy had signed a train-and-trial deal with Manly ahead of the 2026 NRL season. In September, Hoy was one of the twelve players released by Manly. He made no first grade appearances for the club instead featuring for Manly's NSW Cup side which came last.
