= Sam Eseh =

English professional rugby league footballer

Personal information
- Full name: Samuel Eseh Jr
- Born: 30 June 2003 (age 23) Leeds, West Yorkshire, England
- Height: 6 ft 4 in (1.93 m)
- Weight: 17 st 0 lb (108 kg)

Playing information
- Position: Prop
Club
| Years | Team | Pld | T | G | FG | P |
|---|---|---|---|---|---|---|
| 2022–23 | Wakefield Trinity | 15 | 0 | 0 | 0 | 0 |
| 2022(loan) | → Barrow Raiders | 5 | 0 | 0 | 0 | 0 |
| 2022(loan) | → Featherstone Rovers | 14 | 3 | 0 | 0 | 12 |
| 2024–26 | Wigan Warriors | 20 | 3 | 0 | 0 | 12 |
| 2024(loan) | → Castleford Tigers | 1 | 0 | 0 | 0 | 0 |
| 2024(loan) | → Leeds Rhinos | 5 | 0 | 0 | 0 | 0 |
| 2024(loan) | → Hull FC | 4 | 0 | 0 | 0 | 0 |
| 2025(loan) | → Hull FC | 17 | 3 | 0 | 0 | 12 |
| 2027– | Bradford Bulls | 0 | 0 | 0 | 0 | 0 |
| | Total | 81 | 9 | 0 | 0 | 36 |
- Source: As of 19 November 2026

Sam Eseh (born 30 June 2003) is an English professional rugby league footballer who plays as a prop for the Bradford Bulls in the Betfred Super League.

He has played for Wakefield Trinity in the Super League. He spent time on loan from Wakefield at the Barrow Raiders and Featherstone Rovers in the RFL Championship. Eseh has spent time on loan from Wigan at the Castleford Tigers, Leeds Rhinos and two separate spells at Hull FC in the top flight.

== Background ==
Eseh was born in Leeds, West Yorkshire, England and raised in Halton Moor, Leeds. He played for East Leeds and the Chapeltown Cougars as a junior.

== Career ==
=== Wakefield Trinity ===
He joined the Wakefield Trinity Scholarship and Academy system, and graduated into the Trinity first team squad ahead of the 2021 season.

=== Barrow Raiders (loan) ===
Eseh made his professional debut in April 2022 on loan from Wakefield Trinity at the Barrow Raiders against the Halifax Panthers in the RFL Championship.

=== Featherstone Rovers (loan) ===
In June 2022 he was sent on loan to Featherstone Rovers for the remainder of the 2022 RFL Championship season.

Eseh made his Super League debut for Wakefield Trinity against the Huddersfield Giants in March 2023.

=== Wigan Warriors ===
He joined the Wigan Warriors on a two-year deal, with the option of a third, following the conclusion of his Wakefield Trinity deal at the end of the 2023 Super League season.

=== Castleford Tigers (loan) ===
Eseh spent April and May 2024 on loan from the Warriors, over two separate spells at the Castleford Tigers in the Super League.

=== Leeds Rhinos (loan) ===
He spent June and July 2024 on loan from Wigan at the Leeds Rhinos in the Super League.

=== Hull FC (loan) ===
Following a short recall to his parent club, Eseh was sent on loan to Hull FC in August 2024 for the remainder of the season.

He spent the 2025 season on loan from Wigan at Hull FC in the Super League.

=== Bradford Bulls ===
On 8 June 2026 it was reported that he had signed for Bradford Bulls in the Super League
