= 2024 Super League season results =

2024 British rugby league results

2024 was the 29th season of the Super League, and 130th season of rugby league in Great Britain. The season began on 15 February 2024, with the Hull Derby at the MKM Stadium, whilst defending champions Wigan started their campaign away to Castleford.

The full fixture list was released on 21 November 2023, with newly promoted London Broncos set to take on St Helens. Due to Wigan's involvement in the 2024 World Club Challenge, their round 2 fixture at home to Leigh on 24 February, was postponed to a later date.

All times (including matches played in France) are UK local time; GMT (UTC±00:00) until 31 March, BST (UTC+01:00) thereafter.

== Regular season ==
=== Round 1 ===
Home	Score	Away	Match information
Home	Score	Away	Date and time	Venue	Referee	Attendance
Hull FC	0–22	Hull KR	15 February 2024, 20:00	MKM Stadium	Liam Moore	20,014
Leeds Rhinos	22–16	Salford Red Devils	16 February 2024, 20:00	AMT Headingley Stadium	Aaron Moore	15,126
Leigh Leopards	8–16	Huddersfield Giants	16 February 2024, 20:00	Leigh Sports Village	Jack Smith	8,508
St Helens	40–4	London Broncos	16 February 2024, 20:00	Totally Wicked Stadium	James Vella	14,058
Castleford Tigers	4–32	Wigan Warriors	17 February 2024, 17:30	The Mend-A-Hose Jungle	Tom Grant	10,117
Catalans Dragons	16–10	Warrington Wolves	17 February 2024, 17:30	Stade Gilbert Brutus	Chris Kendall	8,876

=== Round 2 ===
Home	Score	Away	Match information
Home	Score	Away	Date and time	Venue	Referee	Attendance
Hull KR	22–12	Leeds Rhinos	22 February 2024, 20:00	Sewell Group Craven Park	Jack Smith	9,879
London Broncos	0–34	Catalans Dragons	23 February 2024, 20:00	Cherry Red Records Stadium	Tom Grant	5,102
Warrington Wolves	36–10	Hull FC	23 February 2024, 20:00	Halliwell Jones Stadium	Marcus Griffiths	9,431
Huddersfield Giants	0–28	St Helens	24 February 2024, 17:30	John Smith's Stadium	Aaron Moore	6,812
Salford Red Devils	26–22	Castleford Tigers	25 February 2024, 15:00	Salford Community Stadium	James Vella	4,770
Wigan Warriors	28–6	Leigh Leopards	6 August 2024, 20:00 (Note: Original fixture on 24 February postponed, due to Wigan's involvement in the World Club Challenge.)	Brick Community Stadium	Chris Kendall	13,249

=== Round 3 ===
Home	Score	Away	Match information
Home	Score	Away	Date and time	Venue	Referee	Attendance
St Helens	12–4	Leigh Leopards	1 March 2024, 20:00	Totally Wicked Stadium	Liam Moore	13,028
Warrington Wolves	30–8	Castleford Tigers	1 March 2024, 20:00	Halliwell Jones Stadium	Aaron Moore	8,483
Wigan Warriors	30–16	Huddersfield Giants	1 March 2024, 20:00	DW Stadium	Jack Smith	15,357
Leeds Rhinos	18–10	Catalans Dragons	2 March 2024, 15:00	AMT Headingley Stadium	Chris Kendall	14,168
Salford Red Devils	17–10	Hull KR	2 March 2024, 17:30	Salford Community Stadium	Tom Grant	5,036
Hull FC	28–24	London Broncos	3 March 2024, 15:00	MKM Stadium	James Vella	10,066

=== Round 4 ===
Home	Score	Away	Match information
Home	Score	Away	Date and time	Venue	Referee	Attendance
Hull KR	20–22	Warrington Wolves	7 March 2024, 20:00	Sewell Group Craven Park	Aaron Moore	9,524
Castleford Tigers	8–50	Huddersfield Giants	8 March 2024, 20:00	The Mend-A-Hose Jungle	Liam Moore	7,040
Leigh Leopards	16–22	Leeds Rhinos	8 March 2024, 20:00	Leigh Sports Village	Chris Kendall	8,794
St Helens	20–24	Salford Red Devils	8 March 2024, 20:00	Totally Wicked Stadium	Tom Grant	11,548
London Broncos	22–60	Wigan Warriors	9 March 2024, 15:00	Cherry Red Records Stadium	James Vella	4,116
Catalans Dragons	26–12	Hull FC	9 March 2024, 17:30	Stade Gilbert Brutus	Jack Smith	9,140

=== Round 5 ===
Home	Score	Away	Match information
Home	Score	Away	Date and time	Venue	Referee	Attendance
Salford Red Devils	12–22	Wigan Warriors	14 March 2024, 20:00	Salford Community Stadium	Chris Kendall	6,087
Leeds Rhinos	8–18	St Helens	15 March 2024, 20:00	AMT Headingley Stadium	Jack Smith	15,284
Huddersfield Giants	12–24	Hull KR	16 March 2024, 15:00	John Smiths Stadium	Tom Grant	5,428
Hull FC	4–54	Leigh Leopards	16 March 2024, 15:00	MKM Stadium	Aaron Moore	10,227
Catalans Dragons	40–14	Castleford Tigers	16 March 2024, 17:30	Stade Gilbert Brutus	James Vella	8,159
London Broncos	4–58	Warrington Wolves	17 March 2024, 15:00	Cherry Red Records Stadium	Liam Rush	3,324

=== Round 6 (Easter Weekend/Rivals Round) ===
Home	Score	Away	Match information
Home	Score	Away	Date and time	Venue	Referee	Attendance
Castleford Tigers	6–26	Leeds Rhinos	28 March 2024, 20:00	The Mend-A-Hose Jungle	Aaron Moore	9,026
Hull KR	34–10	Hull FC	29 March 2024, 12:30	Sewell Group Craven Park	Liam Moore	11,050
St Helens	12–4	Wigan Warriors	29 March 2024, 15:00	Totally Wicked Stadium	Chris Kendall	17,980
Warrington Wolves	24–32	Catalans Dragons	30 March 2024, 15:00	Halliwell Jones Stadium	Jack Smith	11,240
Salford Red Devils	32–22	Leigh Leopards	30 March 2024, 17:30	Salford Community Stadium	James Vella	6,177
London Broncos	6–26	Huddersfield Giants	31 March 2024, 15:00	Cherry Red Records Stadium	Tom Grant	2,300 (Note: London didn't give an actual attendance, but confirmed that 2,300 was an estimated figure)

=== Round 7 ===
Home	Score	Away	Match information
Home	Score	Away	Date and time	Venue	Referee	Attendance
Leigh Leopards	12–40	Wigan Warriors	4 April 2024; 20:00	Leigh Sports Village	Jack Smith	10,308
Castleford Tigers	36–24	Salford Red Devils	5 April 2024; 20:00	The Mend-A-Hose Jungle	Chris Kendall	7,967
Hull KR	50–10	London Broncos	5 April 2024; 20:00	Sewell Group Craven Park	Marcus Griffiths	10,201
Leeds Rhinos	8–34	Warrington Wolves	5 April 2024; 20:00	Headingley	Aaron Moore	12,297
Hull FC	22–56	Huddersfield Giants	6 April 2024; 15:00	MKM Stadium	Tom Grant	9,631
Catalans Dragons	14–8	St Helens	6 April 2024; 20:00	Stade Gilbert Brutus	Liam Moore	10,724

=== Round 8 ===
Home	Score	Away	Match information
Home	Score	Away	Date and time	Venue	Referee	Attendance
Leeds Rhinos	24–30	Huddersfield Giants	19 April 2024; 20:00	Headingley	Chris Kendall	13,128
St Helens	58–0	Hull FC	19 April 2024; 20:00	Totally Wicked Stadium	Tom Grant	10,488
Wigan Warriors	36–14	Castleford Tigers	19 April 2024; 20:00	DW Stadium	James Vella	13,029
London Broncos	4–12	Salford Red Devils	20 April 2024; 15:00	Cherry Red Records Stadium	Aaron Moore	2,450
Warrington Wolves	16–14	Leigh Leopards	20 April 2024; 15:00	Halliwell Jones Stadium	Liam Moore	10,443
Catalans Dragons	36–6	Hull KR	20 April 2024; 17:30	Stade Gilbert Brutus	Jack Smith	8,583

=== Round 9 ===
Home	Score	Away	Match information
Home	Score	Away	Date and time	Venue	Referee	Attendance
St Helens	13–12	Huddersfield Giants	25 April 2024, 20:00	Totally Wicked Stadium	Liam Moore	9,888
Castleford Tigers	40–0	London Broncos	26 April 2024, 20:00	The Mend-A-Hose Jungle	Jack Smith	6,996
Hull KR	26–10	Wigan Warriors	26 April 2024, 20:00	Sewell Group Craven Park	Tom Grant	9,945
Leigh Leopards	30–2	Catalans Dragons	26 April 2024, 20:00	Leigh Sports Village	Aaron Moore	7,321
Salford Red Devils	17–12	Warrington Wolves	27 April 2024, 15:00	Salford Community Stadium	James Vella	5,910
Hull FC	12–18	Leeds Rhinos	28 April 2024, 15:00	MKM Stadium	Liam Rush	10,505

=== Round 10 ===
Home	Score	Away	Match information
Home	Score	Away	Date and time	Venue	Referee	Attendance
Wigan Warriors	30–8	Catalans Dragons	2 May 2024, 20:00	DW Stadium	Jack Smith	14,481
Huddersfield Giants	16–18	Salford Red Devils	3 May 2024, 20:00	John Smiths Stadium	Tom Grant	4,843
Leeds Rhinos	48–8	London Broncos	3 May 2024, 20:00	AMT Headingley Stadium	Aaron Moore	13,259
Warrington Wolves	24–6	Hull FC	3 May 2024, 20:00	Halliwell Jones Stadium	Liam Moore	8,680
Hull KR	40–20	St Helens	4 May 2024, 15:00	Sewell Group Craven Park	Chris Kendall	10,171
Leigh Leopards	28–28; (g.p.)	Castleford Tigers	4 May 2024, 17:30	Leigh Sports Village	James Vella	8,035

=== Round 11 ===
Home	Score	Away	Match information
Home	Score	Away	Date and time	Venue	Referee	Attendance
Warrington Wolves	20–8	Hull KR	9 May 2024, 20:00	Halliwell Jones Stadium	James Vella	8,578
Castleford Tigers	4–60	St Helens	10 May 2024, 20:00	The Mend-A-Hose Jungle	Jack Smith	7,869
Leigh Leopards	40–12	Salford Red Devils	10 May 2024, 20:00	Leigh Sports Village	Liam Moore	8,103
Huddersfield Giants	6–48	Wigan Warriors	11 May 2024, 15:00	John Smiths Stadium	Aaron Moore	5,334
Catalans Dragons	26–0	Leeds Rhinos	11 May 2024, 17:30	Stade Gilbert Brutus	Tom Grant	9,546
London Broncos	34–18	Hull FC	12 May 2024, 15:00	Plough Lane	Chris Kendall	3,225

=== Round 12 ===
Home	Score	Away	Match information
Home	Score	Away	Date and time	Venue	Referee	Attendance
Castleford Tigers	30–22	Hull FC	24 May 2024, 20:00	The Mend-A-Hose Jungle	Aaron Moore	8,269
Huddersfield Giants	10–16	Leigh Leopards	24 May 2024, 20:00	John Smiths Stadium	James Vella	4,385
St Helens	40–10	Leeds Rhinos	24 May 2024, 20:00	Totally Wicked Stadium	Liam Moore	11,367
Catalans Dragons	8–16	Warrington Wolves	25 May 2024, 17:30	Stade Gilbert Brutus	Chris Kendall	9,440
London Broncos	14–64	Hull KR	26 May 2024, 15:00	Plough Lane	Ben Thaler	3,750
Salford Red Devils	6–26	Wigan Warriors	26 May 2024, 15:00	Salford Community Stadium	Tom Grant	4,087

=== Round 13 ===
Home	Score	Away	Match information
Home	Score	Away	Date and time	Venue	Referee	Attendance
Huddersfield Giants	24–18	Hull FC	31 May 2024, 19:45	John Smiths Stadium	Ben Thaler	4,102
St Helens	24–12	Catalans Dragons	31 May 2024, 20:00	Totally Wicked Stadium	Aaron Moore	11,088
Warrington Wolves	18–19	Wigan Warriors	1 June 2024, 15:00	Halliwell Jones Stadium	Jack Smith	12,181
Hull KR	12–0	Leigh Leopards	1 June 2024, 17:30	Sewell Group Craven Park	Liam Moore	9,889
Leeds Rhinos	32–4	Castleford Tigers	1 June 2024, 17:30	Headingley	Chris Kendall	14,529
Salford Red Devils	32–4	London Broncos	2 June 2024, 15:00	Salford Community Stadium	Liam Rush	2,843

=== Round 14 ===
Home	Score	Away	Match information
Home	Score	Away	Date and time	Venue	Referee	Attendance
Castleford Tigers	8–10	Wigan Warriors	14 June 2024, 20:00	The Mend-A-Hose Jungle	Ben Thaler	6,965
Hull KR	32–6	Huddersfield Giants	14 June 2024, 20:00	Sewell Group Craven Park	Tom Grant	10,200: (estimated)
Warrington Wolves	14–25	Salford Red Devils	14 June 2024, 20:00	Halliwell Jones Stadium	Aaron Moore	9,257
Hull FC	18–10	Leeds Rhinos	15 June 2024, 15:00	MKM Stadium	Liam Moore	12,166
Catalans Dragons	2–10	Leigh Leopards	15 June 2024, 17:30	Stade Gilbert Brutus	Jack Smith	9,480
London Broncos	6–52	St Helens	16 June 2024, 15:00	Twickenham Stoop	James Vella	4,600

=== Round 15 ===
Home	Score	Away	Match information
Home	Score	Away	Date and time	Venue	Referee	Attendance
Castleford Tigers	12–13	Hull KR	20 June 2024, 20:00	The Mend-A-Hose Jungle	Aaron Moore	7,897
Leeds Rhinos	18–10	Leigh Leopards	21 June 2024, 20:00	AMT Headingley Stadium	Chris Kendall	17,535
Wigan Warriors	36–0	London Broncos	21 June 2024, 20:00	Brick Community Stadium	Liam Rush	14,280
Hull FC	18–24	Warrington Wolves	22 June 2024, 15:00	MKM Stadium	Ben Thaler	10,083
Catalans Dragons	22–18	Huddersfield Giants	22 June 2024, 17:30	Stade Gilbert Brutus	Liam Moore	8,254
Salford Red Devils	20–18	St Helens	23 June 2024, 15:00	Salford Community Stadium	Jack Smith	5,724

=== Round 16 ===
Home	Score	Away	Match information
Home	Score	Away	Date and time	Venue	Referee	Attendance
St Helens	6–8	Castleford Tigers	5 July 2024, 20:00	Totally Wicked Stadium	Tom Grant	9,808
Warrington Wolves	48–0	Huddersfield Giants	5 July 2024, 20:00	Halliwell Jones Stadium	Jack Smith	9,760
Wigan Warriors	24–6	Leigh Leopards	5 July 2024, 20:00	Brick Community Stadium	Aaron Moore	16,053
Leeds Rhinos	17–16 (g.p.)	London Broncos	6 July 2024, 15:00	AMT Headingley Stadium	Marcus Griffiths	12,958
Hull KR	14–15 (g.p.)	Catalans Dragons	6 July 2024, 17:30	Sewell Group Craven Park	Liam Moore	9,579
Salford Red Devils	22–20	Hull FC	7 July 2024, 15:00	Salford Community Stadium	Chris Kendall	3,910

- (g.p): after extra time

=== Round 17 ===
Home	Score	Away	Match information
Home	Score	Away	Date and time	Venue	Referee	Attendance
Warrington Wolves	30–18	Leeds Rhinos	11 July 2024, 20:00	Halliwell Jones Stadium	Jack Smith	8,471
London Broncos	20–34	Castleford Tigers	12 July 2024, 20:00	Kuflink Stadium	James Vella	2,050
Wigan Warriors	16–12	St Helens	12 July 2024, 20:00	Brick Community Stadium	Liam Moore	20,152
Hull FC	10–24	Hull KR	13 July 2024, 15:00	MKM Stadium	Chris Kendall	15,392
Leigh Leopards	20–16	Huddersfield Giants	13 July 2024, 15:00	Leigh Sports Village	Tom Grant	7,160
Catalans Dragons	20–0	Salford Red Devils	13 July 2024, 17:30	Stade Gilbert Brutus	Aaron Moore	7,750

=== Round 18 ===
Home	Score	Away	Match information
Home	Score	Away	Date and time	Venue	Referee	Attendance
Huddersfield Giants	16–8	Salford Red Devils	19 July 2024, 19:45	John Smiths Stadium	Jack Smith	4,119
St Helens	10–24	Warrington Wolves	19 July 2024, 20:00	Totally Wicked Stadium	Chris Kendall	13,135
Leigh Leopards	36–6	London Broncos	19 July 2024, 20:00	Leigh Sports Village	Liam Rush	6,677
Hull FC	24–22	Wigan Warriors	20 July 2024, 14:00	MKM Stadium	Aaron Moore	5,771
Leeds Rhinos	12–20	Hull KR	20 July 2024, 15:00	AMT Headingley Stadium	Liam Moore	14,555
Castleford Tigers	24–18	Catalans Dragons	21 July 2024, 15:00	The Mend-A-Hose Jungle	Marcus Griffiths	7,331

=== Round 19 ===
Home	Score	Away	Match information
Home	Score	Away	Date and time	Venue	Referee	Attendance
Huddersfield Giants	6–34	Leeds Rhinos	25 July 2024, 20:00	John Smiths Stadium	Marcus Griffiths	4,924
Hull KR	40–16	London Broncos	26 July 2024, 20:00	Sewell Group Craven Park	Tom Grant	9,346
Leigh Leopards	46–4	St Helens	26 July 2024, 20:00	Leigh Sports Village	Aaron Moore	8,021
Wigan Warriors	4–40	Warrington Wolves	26 July 2024, 20:00	Brick Community Stadium	Liam Moore	15,764
Salford Red Devils	30–22	Castleford Tigers	27 July 2024, 15:00	Salford Community Stadium	Chris Kendall	3,146
Catalans Dragons	24–16	Hull FC	27 July 2024, 18:00	Stade Gilbert Brutus	Liam Rush	9,214

=== Round 20 ===
Home	Score	Away	Match information
Home	Score	Away	Date and time	Venue	Referee	Attendance
Castleford Tigers	10–20	Leigh Leopards	1 August 2024, 20:00	The Mend-A-Hose Jungle	Marcus Griffiths	7,247
Wigan Warriors	28–14	Huddersfield Giants	1 August 2024, 20:00	Brick Community Stadium	Aaron Moore	11,660
Warrington Wolves	4–22	Hull KR	2 August 2024, 20:00	Halliwell Jones Stadium	Jack Smith	12,102
Hull FC	6–46	St Helens	3 August 2024, 15:00	MKM Stadium	Liam Moore	9,885
Salford Red Devils	22–16	Leeds Rhinos	3 August 2024, 17:30	Salford Community Stadium	Tom Grant	4,473
London Broncos	12–10	Catalans Dragons	4 August 2024, 18:00	Cherry Red Records Stadium	James Vella	1,900

=== Round 21 ===
Home	Score	Away	Match information
Home	Score	Away	Date and time	Venue	Referee	Attendance
St Helens	17–16 (g.p.)	Salford Red Devils	8 August 2024, 20:00	Totally Wicked Stadium	Chris Kendall	11,050
Huddersfield Giants	22–23	Catalans Dragons	9 August 2024, 20:00	John Smiths Stadium	Tom Grant	3,330
Hull KR	36–6	Castleford Tigers	9 August 2024, 20:00	Sewell Group Craven Park	Liam Rush	9,585
Leeds Rhinos	30–4	Wigan Warriors	10 August 2024, 15:00	AMT Headingley Stadium	Liam Moore	12,459
Leigh Leopards	42–12	Hull FC	11 August 2024, 15:00	Leigh Sports Village	Jack Smith	8,400
London Broncos	22–36	Warrington Wolves	11 August 2024, 15:00	Cherry Red Records Stadium	Marcus Griffiths	2,150

=== Round 22 (Magic Weekend) ===
Home	Score	Away	Match information
Home	Score	Away	Date and time	Venue	Referee	Attendance
Hull FC	4–29	London Broncos	17 August 2024, 14:30	Elland Road	Liam Rush	30,810 (Day 1)
Wigan Warriors	20–0	St Helens	17 August 2024, 17:00	Elland Road	Jack Smith	30,810 (Day 1)
Warrington Wolves	24–6	Leeds Rhinos	17 August 2024, 19:30	Elland Road	Chris Kendall	30,810 (Day 1)
Leigh Leopards	26–0	Salford Red Devils	18 August 2024, 13:30	Elland Road	Liam Moore	22,293 (Day 2)
Catalans Dragons	4–36	Hull KR	18 August 2024, 16:00	Elland Road	Tom Grant	22,293 (Day 2)
Huddersfield Giants	20–12	Castleford Tigers	18 August 2024, 18:30	Elland Road	Aaron Moore	22,293 (Day 2)

=== Round 23 ===
Home	Score	Away	Match information
Home	Score	Away	Date and time	Venue	Referee	Attendance
Castleford Tigers	6–28	Warrington Wolves	23 August 2024, 20:00	The Mend-A-Hose Jungle	Tom Grant	7,449
Leeds Rhinos	18–6	Catalans Dragons	23 August 2024, 20:00	AMT Headingley Stadium	Liam Moore	13,050
St Helens	6–42	Hull KR	24 August 2024, 15:00	Totally Wicked Stadium	Chris Kendall	13,588
Salford Red Devils	60–10	Huddersfield Giants	24 August 2024, 17:30	Salford Community Stadium	Marcus Griffiths	3,319
London Broncos	12–32	Leigh Leopards	25 August 2024, 15:00	Cherry Red Records Stadium	Jack Smith	1,950
Wigan Warriors	22–4	Hull FC	25 August 2024, 15:00	Brick Community Stadium	Aaron Moore	12,347

=== Round 24 ===
Home	Score	Away	Match information
Home	Score	Away	Date and time	Venue	Referee	Attendance
Hull KR	32–12	Salford Red Devils	30 August 2024, 20:00	Sewell Group Craven Park	Jack Smith	9,694
Leigh Leopards	16–12	Warrington Wolves	30 August 2024, 20:00	Leigh Sports Village	Liam Moore	9,434
Hull FC	20–39	Castleford Tigers	31 August 2024, 15:00	MKM Stadium	Liam Rush	10,271
Catalans Dragons	18–26	Wigan Warriors	31 August 2024, 20:00	Stade Gilbert Brutus	Chris Kendall	11,083
Huddersfield Giants	10–18	St Helens	1 September 2024, 15:00	John Smiths Stadium	Aaron Moore	3,877
London Broncos	20–21 (g.p.)	Leeds Rhinos	1 September 2024, 15:00	Cherry Red Records Stadium	Marcus Griffiths	4,403

- g.p.: After extra time

=== Round 25 ===
Home	Score	Away	Match information
Home	Score	Away	Date and time	Venue	Referee	Attendance
Castleford Tigers	12–34	Leigh Leopards	6 September 2024, 20:00	The Mend-A-Hose Jungle	Aaron Moore	9,053
Leeds Rhinos	68–6	Hull FC	6 September 2024, 20:00	AMT Headingley Stadium	Tom Grant	14,105
Wigan Warriors	24–20	Hull KR	6 September 2024, 20:00	Brick Community Stadium	Jack Smith	16,719
Warrington Wolves	16–2	St Helens	7 September 2024, 15:00	Halliwell Jones Stadium	Chris Kendall	12,015
Salford Red Devils	27–12	Catalans Dragons	7 September 2024, 17:30	Salford Community Stadium	Liam Moore	4,910
Huddersfield Giants	22–16	London Broncos	8 September 2024, 15:00	John Smiths Stadium	James Vella	3,439

=== Round 26 ===
Home	Score	Away	Match information
Home	Score	Away	Date and time	Venue	Referee	Attendance
Leigh Leopards	0–24	Hull KR	13 September 2024, 20:00	Leigh Sports Village	Chris Kendall	8,412
St Helens	40–4	Castleford Tigers	13 September 2024, 20:00	Totally Wicked Stadium	Jack Smith	12,058
Wigan Warriors	38–0	Leeds Rhinos	13 September 2024, 20:00	Brick Community Stadium	Liam Moore	15,146
Hull FC	4–58	Salford Red Devils	14 September 2024, 17:00	MKM Stadium	Aaron Moore	9,274
Huddersfield Giants	0–66	Warrington Wolves	14 September 2024, 18:00	John Smiths Stadium	Tom Grant	4,181
Catalans Dragons	12–8	London Broncos	14 September 2024, 20:00	Stade Gilbert Brutus	Marcus Griffiths	8,855

=== Round 27 ===
Home	Score	Away	Match information
Home	Score	Away	Date and time	Venue	Referee	Attendance
Huddersfield Giants	34–10	Castleford Tigers	19 September 2024, 20:00	John Smiths Stadium	James Vella	4,138
Wigan Warriors	64–0	Salford Red Devils	19 September 2024, 20:00	Brick Community Stadium	Chris Kendall	15,589
Hull KR	26–16	Leeds Rhinos	20 September 2024, 20:00	Sewell Group Craven Park	Jack Smith	11,200
Leigh Leopards	18–12	St Helens	20 September 2024, 20:00	Leigh Sports Village	Liam Moore	9,899
Warrington Wolves	54–0	London Broncos	20 September 2024, 20:00	Halliwell Jones Stadium	Aaron Moore	10,192
Hull FC	4–24	Catalans Dragons	21 September 2024, 15:00	MKM Stadium	Tom Grant	9,384

== Play-offs ==
=== Summary ===
Home	Score	Away	Match Information
Home	Score	Away	Date and Time (Local)	Venue	Referee	Attendance
Eliminators
Salford Red Devils	6–14	Leigh Leopards	27 September 2024, 20:00	Salford Stadium	Jack Smith	10,867
Warrington Wolves	23–22 (g.p.)	St Helens	28 September 2024, 17:30	Halliwell Jones Stadium	Liam Moore	12,111
Semi-finals
Hull KR	10–8	Warrington Wolves	4 October 2024, 20:00	Sewell Group Craven Park	Liam Moore	12,225 (Note: no official attendance given, but the match was a sellout)
Wigan Warriors	38–0	Leigh Leopards	5 October 2024, 17:30	Brick Community Stadium	Chris Kendall	20,511
Grand Final
Wigan Warriors	9–2	Hull KR	12 October 2024, 18:00	Old Trafford	Chris Kendall	68,173
