= Craig Lingard =

English RL coach and former rugby league footballer

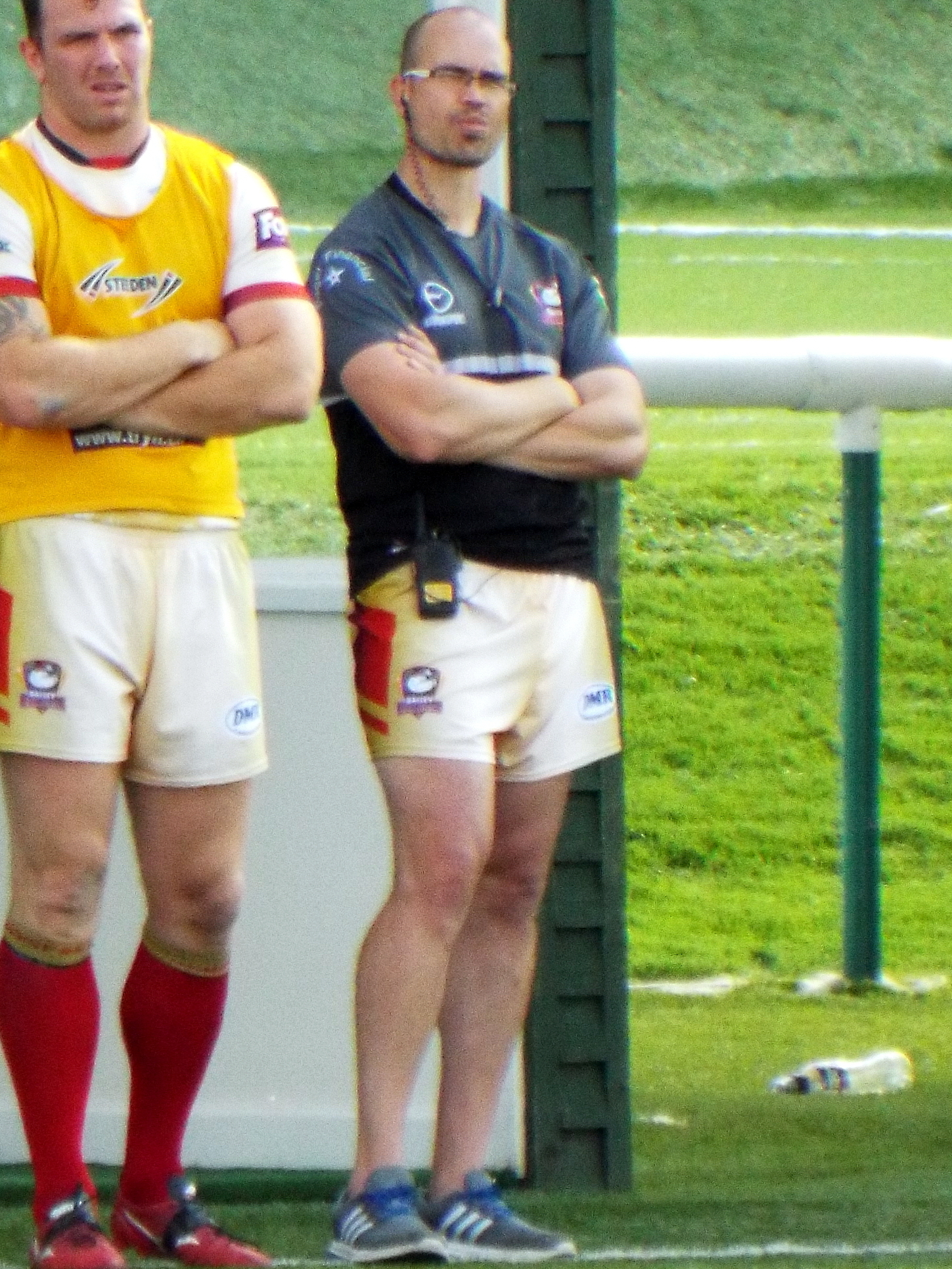

Personal information
- Born: 11 December 1977 (age 48) Wakefield, West Yorkshire, England

Playing information
- Position: Fullback
Club
Years	Team	Pld	T	G	FG	P
1998–08	Batley Bulldogs	205	142	0	0	568

Coaching information
Club
Years	Team	Gms	W	D	L	W%
2012	Bramley Buffaloes
2017–19	Keighley Cougars	63	31	3	28	49
2020–23	Batley Bulldogs	96	55	2	39	57
2024	Castleford Tigers	29	8	1	20	28
2025–26	Sheffield Eagles	58	27	0	31	47
	Total	246	121	6	118	49
- Source: As of 19 October 2026
- Relatives: Ivor Lingard (1st cousin once removed)

Craig Lingard (born 11 December 1977) is an English rugby league coach and former professional rugby league footballer. He was most recently the head-coach of the Sheffield Eagles in the RFL Championship.

Lingard played as a fullback for the Batley Bulldogs in the Championship, where he is the all-time leading try scorer. He has previously been head coach of the Bramley Buffaloes. He was assistant coach to John Kear at Batley before taking on the top job at the Keighley Cougars in RFL League 1. He returned to Batley as head coach for the 2020 season.

== Background ==
Lingard was born in Wakefield, West Yorkshire, England.

== Playing career ==
Lingard played as an amateur with Sharlston Rovers before turning professional. His professional playing career was at Batley Bulldogs, where he played from 1998 to 2008. Playing at fullback, Lingard scored 142 tries and is Batley's all-time leading try scorer. In a tribute to this record, the club named one of the terraces at the Fox's Biscuits Stadium the Craig Lingard Terrace.

== Coaching career ==
=== Early career ===
After retiring from playing, Lingard joined the Bulldogs' coaching team and also worked as part of the Bradford Bulls coaching staff before being appointed head coach of National Conference League team, Bramley Buffaloes, in 2012. After just one season at Bramley, Lingard left and rejoined Batley as assistant head coach to John Kear. He continued in his Batley role until the end of the 2016 season.

=== Keighley Cougars ===
In September 2016, Lingard was appointed head coach at Keighley Cougars on a two-year contract. Lingard's contract was extended for a third year but in May 2019 he was sacked by Keighley.

=== Batley Bulldogs ===
Lingard's return to the Batley Bulldogs was announced in September 2019, this time being appointed the role of head coach.

In the 2022 Championship season, Lingard guided Batley to the Million Pound Game. Batley went on to be defeated by Leigh 44–12.

In his final season in charge, Lingard led Batley to the 2023 RFL 1895 Cup final, the club's first match to be played at Wembley Stadium. The Bulldogs fell to a narrow 10–12 defeat against the Halifax Panthers.

=== Castleford Tigers ===
In May 2023, it was announced that Lingard had joined Castleford Tigers in the Super League, working as an assistant coach under Andy Last. He was appointed on a two-and-a-half-year contract, although would continue as Batley's head coach for the remainder of the 2023 season. In August, following Last's dismissal and with Castleford level on points at the bottom of the table, he was joined by a new short-term coaching staff of Danny Ward and Dane Dorahy and was tasked with securing Super League survival. The Tigers won two games to confirm their top flight status in the final six rounds, although Ward and Dorahy's departures meant that the head coach role was left vacant upon the season's completion.

On 17 October 2023, Castleford announced the appointment of Lingard as the new head coach on a two-year deal. He said, "I am massively honoured. Something I've always aspired to be is a head coach in Super League and I've got that opportunity now." He would be working alongside new assistant coach Danny McGuire, who was joining from Hull Kingston Rovers. On 21 October 2024, it was announced that Lingard had been sacked by Castleford, after just one season in charge.

=== Sheffield Eagles ===
On 2 December 2024 it was reported that he had been appointed as head-coach of the Sheffield Eagles in the RFL Championship.

On 1 October 2026 it was reported that he had left Sheffield.

== Outside rugby league ==
Lingard's involvement with rugby league has always been part-time and away from the game he was previously a prison officer. While head coach at Bramley, Lingard was a competitor on British gameshow Countdown.
