= 2026 Castleford Tigers season =

English rugby league season

- Super League rank: 13th
- Play-off result: Did not qualify
- Challenge Cup: Fourth round
- 2026 record: Wins: 9; draws: 0; losses: 20
- Points scored: For: 486; against: 898

Team information
- Chairman: Martin Jepson
- Head coach: Ryan Carr (until 5 August); Chris Chester (interim)
- Captain: Alex Mellor
- Stadium: Wheldon Road
- Avg. attendance: 8,191
- Agg. attendance: 106,486
- High attendance: 9,455
- Low attendance: 6,105

Top scorers
- Tries: Jason Qareqare (19)
- Goals: Tom Weaver (64)
- Points: Tom Weaver (148)
← 2025	List of seasons	2027 →

The 2026 season was the Castleford Tigers' 101st season in the Rugby Football League and their 19th consecutive season in the top flight of English rugby league. The club competed in the 2026 Super League and the 2026 Challenge Cup.

Castleford began the season under new head coach Ryan Carr before he left the club for personal reasons in August, with director of rugby Chris Chester taking charge as caretaker. The team was captained by Alex Mellor. They finished the Super League season in 13th place.

== Kits ==
Supplier: Oxen
Main sponsor: CBR Engineering

Home	Away	Third

== First-team squad ==
2026 Castleford Tigers squad
First team squad				Coaching staff
(Australia) 1 Blake Taaffe – FB; (Fiji) 2 Semi Valemei – WG, CE; (Australia) 3 Zac Cini – CE; (England) 4 Darnell McIntosh – CE, WG; (Fiji) 5 Mikaele Ravalawa – WG; (Samoa) 6 Daejarn Asi – SO; (Australia) 7 Tom Weaver – SH; (New Zealand) 8 Renouf Atoni – PR; (Scotland) 9 Liam Hood – HK; (England) 10 George Lawler (vc) – PR, SR; (England) 11 Jordan Lane – SR; (England) 12 Alex Mellor (c) – SR; (Australia) 13 Joe Stimson (vc) – LF, PR	(Australia) 14 Brock Greacen – PR, SR; (England) 15 Jack Ashworth – PR, SR; (England) 16 Joe Westerman – LF, PR; (England) 17 Chris Atkin – SH, HK; (England) 18 Fletcher Rooney – FB; (Ireland) 19 Brad Singleton – PR; (England) 20 Aiden Doolan – HK; (Ireland) 21 Louis Senior – CE, WG; (Fiji) 22 Jason Qareqare – WG; (Australia) 23 Krystian Mapapalangi – CE; (England) 24 Jenson Windley – SO; (England) 25 Sam Hall – PR; (England) 26 Alfie Lindsey – WG	(England) 27 Cain Robb – HK; (England) 28 George Hill – LF, HK; (Brazil) 29 Ramon Silva – PR; (England) 30 Jimmy Beckett – PR; (Jamaica) 31 Ashton Golding – HK, LF; (England) 32 George Hirst – SR, PR; (England) 33 Tom Forber – HK; (Ireland) 34 Jake Thewlis – WG; (England) 35 Phoenix Laulu-Togaga'e – FB; (England) 36 Tyler Dupree – PR; (England) 37 Brad Dwyer – HK; (England) 38 Tom Nicholson-Watton – PR; (England) 39 Jack Brown – PR	(England) 40 Tylor Sharpe – FB, WG; (Samoa) 41 Lazarus Vaalepu – PR; (Ireland) 42 Keanan Brand – CE, WG; (England) 43 Ben McNamara – SO, HK; (England) 44 Daniel Sarbah – CE, WG	Head coach: (Australia) Ryan Carr (until 5 August); (England) Chris Chester (interim); Assistant coaches: (Australia) Brett Delaney (until 27 May); (England) Scott Murrell; (England) Rob Nickolay; (Australia) Adrian Vowles; (England) Luke Robinson; (England) Jason Netherton; Legend: (c) Captain(s); (vc) Vice-captain(s); (gk) Goal kicker

== Transfers and loans ==
=== Transfers in ===
No	Player	From	Contract	Date	Ref.
14	(Australia) Brock Greacen	Newcastle Knights	2 years	31 July 2025	
1	(Australia) Blake Taaffe	Canterbury Bulldogs	3 years	25 August 2025	
5	(Fiji) Mikaele Ravalawa	St George Illawarra	3 years	29 August 2025	
2	(Fiji) Semi Valemei	North Queensland Cowboys	2 years	2 September 2025	
11	(England) Jordan Lane	Hull FC	4 years	10 September 2025	
15	(England) Jack Ashworth	Hull FC	2 years	27 September 2025	
8	(New Zealand) Renouf Atoni	Wakefield Trinity	2 years	29 September 2025	
9	(Scotland) Liam Hood	Wakefield Trinity	1 year (Note: With an option for a further year)	2 October 2025	
4	(England) Darnell McIntosh	Leigh Leopards	2 years	13 October 2025	
7	(Australia) Tom Weaver	Gold Coast Titans	2 years	24 October 2025	
20	(England) Aiden Doolan	Barrow Raiders	2 years	12 November 2025	
30	(England) Jimmy Beckett	Featherstone Rovers	1 year	5 January 2026	
23	(Australia) Krystian Mapapalangi	Wests Tigers	2 years	22 January 2026	
31	(Jamaica) Ashton Golding	Huddersfield Giants	½ year	18 February 2026	
32	(England) George Hirst	Wigan Warriors	2½ years	10 March 2026	
36	(England) Tyler Dupree	Wigan Warriors	3½ years	27 April 2026	
35	(England) Phoenix Laulu-Togaga'e	Catalans Dragons	3½ years	27 April 2026	
39	(England) Jack Brown	Hull Kingston Rovers	2½ years	2 June 2026	

=== Loans in ===
No	Player	From	Loan type	Arrival	Return	Ref.
32	(England) George Hirst	Wigan Warriors	One-month	16 February 2026	Permanent (Note: The deal was made permanent on 10 March 2026)	
33	(England) Tom Forber	Wigan Warriors	One-month, recall	24 March 2026	6 April 2026	
34	(Ireland) Jake Thewlis	Warrington Wolves	One-month, recall	30 March 2026	6 April 2026	
38	(England) Tom Nicholson-Watton	Leeds Rhinos	One-week, rolling	28 April 2026	5 May 2026	
37	(England) Brad Dwyer	Salford RLFC	One-week	28 April 2026	5 May 2026	
41	(Samoa) Lazarus Vaalepu	Leigh Leopards	Season-long	18 August 2026	13 September 2026	
42	(Ireland) Keanan Brand	Leigh Leopards	Season-long	19 August 2026	1 September 2026	
43	(England) Ben McNamara	Leigh Leopards	Season-long	19 August 2026	Permanent (Note: The deal was made permanent at the end of the season)	

=== Transfers out ===
No	Player	To	Contract	Date	Ref.
41	(Australia) Tom Amone	Hull Kingston Rovers	3 years	15 April 2025	
15	(England) George Griffin	Sheffield Eagles	2 years	5 September 2025	
24	(England) Josh Simm	Catalans Dragons	2 years	6 September 2025	
11	(Papua New Guinea) Jeremiah Simbiken	London Broncos	1 year	11 September 2025	
25	(England) Will Tate	Wakefield Trinity	1 year	15 September 2025	
18	(England) Josh Hodson	Sheffield Eagles	2 years	15 September 2025	
17	(England) Luke Hooley	Bradford Bulls	2 years	23 September 2025	
4	(England) Sam Wood	York Knights	1 year	27 September 2025	
5	(Ireland) Innes Senior	Leigh Leopards	2 years	9 October 2025	
20	(Nigeria) Muizz Mustapha	Doncaster R.L.F.C.	2 years	10 October 2025	
9	(Papua New Guinea) Liam Horne	Leigh Leopards	3 years	24 October 2025	
1	(Australia) Tex Hoy	Manly Sea Eagles	1 year	22 November 2025	
44	(England) Andy Djeukessi	Newcastle Thunder	1 year	24 December 2025	
29	(Brazil) Ramon Silva	Released		30 January 2026	
17	(England) Chris Atkin	Bradford Bulls	½ year	18 March 2026	
19	(Ireland) Brad Singleton	Barrow Raiders	½ year	26 May 2026	
3	(Australia) Zac Cini	Released		5 July 2026	
15	(England) Jack Ashworth	Leigh Leopards	2½ years	18 August 2026	

=== Loans out ===
No	Player	To	Loan type	Departure	Return	Ref.
20	(England) Aiden Doolan	Barrow Raiders	Season-long	15 January 2026	19 March 2026	
—	(Estonia) Akim Matvejev	Batley Bulldogs	Season-long	28 January 2026	7 September 2026	
28	(England) George Hill	Keighley Cougars	Season-long	30 January 2026	25 May 2026	
—	(England) Alfie Salmon	Keighley Cougars	Season-long	13 February 2026	20 March 2026	
24	(England) Jenson Windley	Salford RLFC	One-week, rolling	26 February 2026	19 March 2026	
26	(England) Alfie Lindsey	Halifax Panthers	One-week, rolling	5 March 2026	27 April 2026	
27	(England) Cain Robb	Batley Bulldogs	One-month	31 March 2026	28 April 2026	
30	(England) Jimmy Beckett	Goole Vikings	One-week, rolling	1 April 2026	9 April 2026	
30	(England) Jimmy Beckett	Sheffield Eagles	One-month	9 April 2026	28 April 2026	
24	(England) Jenson Windley	Salford RLFC	One-week, rolling	7 May 2026	14 May 2026	
44	(England) Daniel Sarbah	Salford RLFC	One-week, rolling	7 May 2026	22 June 2026	
44	(England) Daniel Sarbah	Salford RLFC	One-month	22 May 2026	22 June 2026	
30	(England) Jimmy Beckett	Batley Bulldogs	One-month	3 June 2026	7 September 2026	
—	(Wales) Sam Grice	Hunslet RLFC	Season-long	22 June 2026	24 August 2026	
15	(England) Jack Ashworth	Doncaster RLFC	One-month	23 June 2026	9 July 2026	
20	(England) Aiden Doolan	Hunslet RLFC	Season-long, recall	30 June 2026	17 August 2026	
24	(England) Jenson Windley	Halifax Panthers	One-month	2 July 2026	9 July 2026	
—	(England) Woody Walker	Whitehaven RLFC	One-week, rolling	10 July 2026	Permanent	
—	(England) Alfie Horwell	Newcastle Thunder	Season-long	14 July 2026	28 September 2026	
5	(Fiji) Mikaele Ravalawa	Doncaster RLFC	Season-long, recall	30 July 2026	12 August 2026	
20	(England) Aiden Doolan	Widnes Vikings	Season-long	20 August 2026	1 September 2026	
26	(England) Alfie Lindsey	Widnes Vikings	Season-long	20 August 2026	1 September 2026	
—	(England) Corey Sharpe	Salford RLFC	Season-long	20 August 2026	31 August 2026	
—	(England) Harrison Jewitt	Workington Town	Season-long	20 August 2026	31 August 2026	
24	(England) Jenson Windley	Widnes Vikings	One-week	25 August 2026	1 September 2026	
—	(Wales) Sam Grice	Widnes Vikings	One-week	25 August 2026	1 September 2026	
—	(England) Sean Coughlan	Widnes Vikings	One-week	25 August 2026	1 September 2026	

== Pre-season friendlies ==
Castleford announced pre-season fixtures against Featherstone Rovers, Oldham, Leeds Rhinos and St Helens. The Leeds fixture served as a testimonial match for Brad Singleton, and the St Helens match for Matty Lees. The Featherstone friendly was cancelled after the opponents entered administration in December. Castleford had additionally planned to attend a pre-season training camp in Spain and play Oldham as part of the Benidorm Bash rugby league festival, however the event was cancelled by the organisers. The fixture was rearranged to Wheldon Road, although was later postponed due to a frozen pitch.

Sat 27 December	Castleford Tigers	P–P (Note: Postponed due to Featherstone entering administration)	Featherstone Rovers	Castleford
13:30 GMT		LRL Report		Stadium: Wheldon Road

Sat 10 January (Note: Originally intended to be played at the Benidorm Bash in Spain; rearranged following the event's cancellation)	Castleford Tigers	P–P (Note: Postponed due to frozen pitch)	Oldham	Castleford
15:00 GMT		YEP Report		Stadium: Wheldon Road

Sun 18 January (Note: Brad Singleton's testimonial match)	Castleford Tigers	26–10	Leeds Rhinos	Castleford
15:00 GMT	Tries: Grice 29'; Windley 35'; Sharpe 65'; Coughlan 69'; Beedle 71'; Goals: Rooney (3/4) 30', 36', 72'; Singleton (0/1)	YEP Report	Tries: Richardson 11'; Brown 42'; Goals: Thomas (1/2) 43'	Stadium: Wheldon Road; Referee: Tom Grant

Sat 24 January (Note: Matty Lees' testimonial match)	St Helens	40–10	Castleford Tigers	St Helens
15:00 GMT	Tries: Macdonald 13'; Robertson 18'; Cross 27'; Wright 52', 63'; Murphy 74'; Sailor 78'; Goals: Hastings (4/5) 14', 19', 53', 64'; Sailor (1/1) 75'; Whitby (1/1) 79'	TRL Report	Tries: Ravalawa 39', 69'; Goals: Weaver (1/2) 40'	Stadium: BrewDog Stadium; Attendance: 5,422; Referee: Jack Smith

== Super League ==
In November 2025, in the days prior to the Super League fixture release, clubs revealed their schedules for the opening round, Rivals Round, and the Magic Weekend. On 27 November, the full Super League fixture list was announced.

=== Results ===
Round 1: Sun 15 February	Castleford Tigers	16–26	Wigan Warriors	Castleford
15:00 GMT	Tries: Hood 8'; Ravalawa 69'; Lawler 80'; Goals: Weaver (2/3) 9', 80'	BBC Report; Sky Report	Tries: Marshall 33'; French 38'; Eckersley 42', 60'; Wardle 65'; Goals: Keighran (3/5) 40', 62', 67'; Sin bin: Keighran (yellow card) 71' to 80'	Stadium: Wheldon Road; Attendance: 8,259; Referee: Jack Smith

Round 2: Sat 21 February	Toulouse Olympique	24–12	Castleford Tigers	Toulouse
19:00 CET	Tries: Jussaume 3'; Rennie 17', 63'; Laguerre 49'; Goals: Rougé (4/5) 19', 51', 64', 74 (p)'	BBC Report; Sky Report	Tries: Mapapalangi 9'; Qareqare 26'; Goals: Weaver (2/3) 10', 36 (p)' Sin bin: Atkin (yellow card) 74' to 80'	Stadium: Stade Ernest-Wallon; Attendance: 5,176; Referee: Marcus Griffiths

Round 3: Fri 27 February	Castleford Tigers	34–8	Huddersfield Giants	Castleford
20:00 GMT	Tries: Hood 6'; McIntosh 20'; Lawler 26'; Weaver 48', 67'; Golding 75'; Goals: Weaver (5/6) 8', 27', 49', 68', 76'	BBC Report; Sky Report	Tries: Gagai 38'; Flanagan 52'; Goals: Flanagan (0/2); Sin bin: Milne (yellow card) 25' to 35'	Stadium: Wheldon Road; Attendance: 6,105; Referee: Matty Lynn

Round 4: Sun 8 March	Leeds Rhinos	22–4	Castleford Tigers	Leeds
15:00 GMT	Tries: Brown 11'; Sivo 29', 46', 54'; Goals: Connor (3/4) 12', 47', 55'	BBC Report; Sky Report	Tries: Ravalawa 18'; Goals: Weaver (0/1)	Stadium: Headingley Rugby Stadium; Attendance: 15,301; Referee: James Vella

Round 5: Sat 21 March	Warrington Wolves	72–6	Castleford Tigers	Warrington
15:00 GMT	Tries: Ashton 7', 14', 76'; Currie 19', 48'; Tanginoa 28', 35', 43', 53'; Hopoate 46'; Stone 63'; Harrison 73'; Goals: Irwin (12/14) 3 (p)', 11 (p)', 15', 20', 30', 36', 45', 46', 49', 54', 64', 74'; Sin bin: King (yellow card) 60' to 70'	BBC Report; Sky Report	Tries: Valemei 24'; Goals: Weaver (1/1) 25'	Stadium: Halliwell Jones Stadium; Attendance: 9,342; Referee: Liam Rush

Round 6: Thu 26 March	Castleford Tigers	40–28	Bradford Bulls	Castleford
20:00 GMT	Tries: Qareqare 7', 25', 40'; McIntosh 38', 51'; Lawler 42'; Weaver 45'; Goals: Weaver (6/7) 9', 26', 40', 43', 46', 52'	BBC Report; Sky Report	Tries: Marsters 2', 79'; Mellor 32'; Hooley 59'; Goals: Hooley (6/6) 4', 17 (p)', 21 (p)', 33', 60', 80'	Stadium: Wheldon Road; Attendance: 7,095; Referee: James Vella

Round 7: Sun 5 April	Castleford Tigers	0–34	Wakefield Trinity	Castleford
15:00 BST		BBC Report; Sky Report	Tries: Trueman 6', 76'; Hall 20'; Smoothy 35'; Pratt 56', 72'; Scott 69'; Goals: Jowitt (3/8) 7', 36', 53 (p)'	Stadium: Wheldon Road; Attendance: 9,455; Referee: Liam Rush

Round 8: Sun 19 April	Wigan Warriors	14–24	Castleford Tigers	Wigan
15:00 BST	Tries: Sambou 25'; Eckersley 29'; Goals: Keighran (3/3) 26', 31', 37 (p)'	BBC Report; Sky Report	Tries: Mapapalangi 5', 50'; Ashworth 46'; Lawler 58'; Goals: Weaver (4/4) 6', 48', 52', 61'	Stadium: Brick Community Stadium; Attendance: 13,442; Referee: James Vella

Round 9: Fri 24 April	Castleford Tigers	10–50	Hull FC	Castleford
20:00 BST	Tries: Mapapalangi 39', 68'; Goals: Weaver (1/2) 40'; Sin bin: Lawler (yellow card) 11' to 21'	BBC Report; Sky Report	Tries: Arthur 6'; Briscoe 13'; Litten 21', 52'; Bailey 32'; Martin 44'; Hardaker 57'; Cust 72'; Aydin 76'; Goals: Hardaker (7/10) 8', 22', 52', 58', 73', 77', 79 (p)'	Stadium: Wheldon Road; Attendance: 8,035; Referee: Tara Jones

Round 10: Thu 30 April	Hull Kingston Rovers	50–6	Castleford Tigers	Kingston upon Hull
20:00 BST	Tries: Lawton 10', 16'; Amone 26'; Davies 32', 40', 75'; Hadley 36'; Lewis 43' Burgess 61'; Goals: Martin (7/9) 11', 18', 27', 33', 37', 45', 62'	BBC Report; Sky Report	Tries: Mapapalangi 80'; Goals: Asi (1/1) 80'	Stadium: Craven Park; Attendance: 11,807; Referee: Jack Smith

Round 11: Sat 16 May	York Knights	18–24	Castleford Tigers	York
15:00 BST	Tries: Vuniyayawa 9'; Wood 27'; Galeano 35'; Goals: Hunter (3/3) 10', 28', 36'	BBC Report; Sky Report	Tries: Hirst 6'; Qareqare 20'; Atoni 49'; Greacen 59'; Goals: Weaver (4/6) 7', 18 (p)', 60', 63 (p)' Sin bin: Hirst (yellow card) 66' to 76'	Stadium: York Community Stadium; Attendance: 6,077; Referee: Marcus Griffiths

Round 12: Sat 23 May	Castleford Tigers	30–10	St Helens	Castleford
15:00 BST	Tries: Qareqare 5', 38', 54'; Greacen 45'; Golding 73'; Goals: Weaver (5/8) 36 (p)', 47', 60 (p)', 69 (p)', 75'	BBC Report; Sky Report	Tries: Murphy 51'; Dagnall 80'; Goals: Hastings (0/1); Sailor (1/1) 80'; Sin bin: Welsby (yellow card) 36' to 46'; Hastings (yellow card) 78' to 80'	Stadium: Wheldon Road; Attendance: 7,721; Referee: Liam Rush

Round 13: Fri 5 June	Castleford Tigers	14–24	Leigh Leopards	Castleford
20:00 BST	Tries: Qareqare 2'; Lawler 56'; Goals: Weaver (3/3) 4', 18 (p)', 59'	BBC Report; Sky Report	Tries: Alick-Wiencke 23'; Senior 26'; Hughes 44'; Cook 66'; Goals: Cook (4/4) 24', 28', 45', 68'	Stadium: Wheldon Road; Attendance: 7,742; Referee: Liam Moore

Round 14: Sat 13 June	Catalans Dragons	34–28	Castleford Tigers	Perpignan
19:00 CEST	Tries: Makinson 7', 13'; Maria 25'; Faataape 37', 53'; Sexton 44'; Goals: Aispuro-Bichet (5/6) 8', 15', 26', 46', 55'	BBC Report; Sky Report	Tries: Qareqare 20'; Brown 31'; Stimson 63'; Mapapalangi 71', 80'; Goals: Weaver (4/6) 32', 40 (p)', 65', 80'	Stadium: Stade Gilbert Brutus; Attendance: 7,222; Referee: Liam Rush

Round 15: Sat 20 June	Castleford Tigers	36–18	Toulouse Olympique	Castleford
20:00 BST	Tries: Weaver 14'; Laulu-Togaga'e 27'; Qareqare 31', 61'; Cini 38'; Asi 48'; Goals: Weaver (6/7) 15', 29', 32', 39', 44 (p)', 49'	BBC Report; Sky Report	Tries: Laguerre 66'; Stefani 72'; Rougé 80'; Goals: Shorrocks (3/3) 68', 73', 80'	Stadium: Wheldon Road; Attendance: 7,439; Referee: Marcus Griffiths

Round 16: Fri 26 June	Castleford Tigers	14–20	York Knights	Castleford
20:00 BST	Tries: Valemei 8', 74'; Qareqare 27'; Goals: Weaver (1/3) 29'	BBC Report; Sky Report	Tries: Hunter 14'; Field 56'; Nofoaluma 64'; Galeano 71'; Goals: Hunter (2/4) 15', 66'; Sin bin: Wood (yellow card) 20' to 30'	Stadium: Wheldon Road; Attendance: 8,079; Referee: Ryan Cox (Note: Original appointment James Vella injured in warm-up)

Round 17: Sun 5 July	Wakefield Trinity	48–6	Castleford Tigers	Liverpool
12:30 BST	Tries: Scott 3', 32'; Johnstone 16', 64'; Hamlin-Uele 24', 61'; Walmsley 47'; Smoothy 51'; Rourke 75'; Goals: Sinfield (6/9) 18', 25', 52', 62', 66', 76'	BBC Report; Sky Report	Tries: Qareqare 79'; Goals: Weaver (1/1) 79'	Stadium: Hill Dickinson Stadium; Attendance: 42,903; Referee: Aaron Moore

Round 18: Sat 11 July	Leigh Leopards	24–18	Castleford Tigers	Leigh
15:00 BST	Tries: Lam 4'; Armstrong 16', 54'; Hanley 44'; Goals: Cook (4/4) 5', 18', 45', 56'	BBC Report; Sky Report	Tries: Hall 26'; Ravalawa 39'; Laulu-Togaga'e 75'; Goals: Stimson (1/1) 27'; Asi (2/2) 40', 76'; Sin bin: Senior (yellow card) 69' to 79'	Stadium: Leigh Sports Village; Attendance: 8,567; Referee: Liam Rush

Round 19: Sun 19 July	Castleford Tigers	36–34	Leeds Rhinos	Castleford
15:00 BST	Tries: Ravalawa 23'; Golding 34'; Qareqare 38', 70'; Asi 56'; Ashworth 62'; Goals: Weaver (6/7) 35', 40', 57', 63', 68 (p)', 71'	BBC Report; Sky Report	Tries: McDonnell 1', 46'; Edgell 10'; Croft 14', 73'; Sivo 26'; Holroyd 43'; Goals: Connor (3/8) 6 (p)', 12', 44'	Stadium: Wheldon Road; Attendance: 9,296; Referee: Liam Rush

Round 20: Fri 24 July	Wakefield Trinity	52–14	Castleford Tigers	Wakefield
20:00 BST	Tries: Storton 1'; Faatili 30'; Jowitt 38'; Vagana 42'; Johnstone 47', 50'; Hall 55'; Walmsley 63', 69'; Goals: Jowitt (8/9) 3', 32', 40', 44', 48', 52', 57', 70'; Sent off: Storton (red card) 23'	BBC Report; Sky Report	Tries: Weaver 16'; Qareqare 25', 77'; Goals: Weaver (1/3) 18'	Stadium: Belle Vue; Attendance: 9,158; Referee: Tom Grant

Round 21: Sat 1 August	Castleford Tigers	18–48	Warrington Wolves	Castleford
15:00 BST	Tries: Asi 13'; Sharpe 16'; Laulu-Togaga'e 21'; Goals: Weaver (3/4) 14', 23', 40 (p)' Sin bin: Mellor (yellow card) 60' to 70'	BBC Report; Sky Report	Tries: Holroyd 8'; Ashton 26', 54'; King 32'; Sipley 36'; Harrison 45'; Hayes 49'; Currie 70'; Goals: Irwin (8/8) 10', 27', 33', 37', 46', 50', 55', 71'; Sin bin: King (yellow card) 65' to 75'	Stadium: Wheldon Road; Attendance: 8,802; Referee: Liam Moore

Round 22: Fri 7 August	Castleford Tigers	0–44	Hull Kingston Rovers	Castleford
20:00 BST		BBC Report; Sky Report	Tries: Litten 11'; Davies 26', 66'; May 46', 57'; Burgess 51'; Hiku 54'; Martin 73'; Goals: Hampshire (1/2) 12'; Martin (5/6) 48', 53', 56', 59', 68'	Stadium: Wheldon Road; Attendance: 9,203; Referee: Marcus Griffiths

Round 23: Fri 14 August	Hull FC	14–18	Castleford Tigers	Kingston upon Hull
20:00 BST	Tries: Batchelor 37'; Barron 48'; Martin 60'; Goals: Sezer (1/3) 38'	BBC Report; Sky Report	Tries: Atoni 10'; Ravalawa 27'; Hood 69'; Goals: Weaver (3/4) 11', 35 (p)', 70'	Stadium: MKM Stadium; Attendance: 12,030; Referee: James Vella

Round 24: Sat 22 August	St Helens	36–12	Castleford Tigers	St Helens
15:00 BST	Tries: Welsby 4'; Wright 7'; Douglas 22'; Humphreys 24'; Sailor 37'; Macdonald 48'; Goals: Hastings (5/5) 6', 8', 23', 26', 38'; Sailor (1/1) 50'; Sin bin: Walmsley (yellow card) 76' to 80'; Matagi (yellow card) 80' to 80'; Sent off: Hastings (red card) 40'	BBC Report; Sky Report	Tries: Senior 53'; Laulu-Togaga'e 63'; Goals: McNamara (2/2) 54', 64'; Sin bin: Dupree (yellow card) 40' to 50'	Stadium: BrewDog Stadium; Attendance: 10,188; Referee: Tom Grant

Round 25: Fri 28 August	Castleford Tigers	6–34	Catalans Dragons	Castleford
20:00 BST	Tries: Vaalepu 37'; Goals: McNamara (1/1) 38'	BBC Report; Sky Report	Tries: Sexton 8', 73'; Rogers-Smith 20'; Darrélatour 47'; Condon 59'; Dodd 70'; Goals: Aispuro-Bichet (5/6) 9', 22', 61', 72', 75'; Sin bin: Garcia (yellow card) 79' to 80'	Stadium: Wheldon Road; Attendance: 9,255; Referee: James Vella

Round 26: Thu 3 September	Bradford Bulls	32–22	Castleford Tigers	Bradford
20:00 BST	Tries: Dean 5'; Wynne 13'; Aekins 17'; Russell 34'; Blake 40'; Scurr 52'; Goals: Atkin (4/6) 6', 15', 19', 53'	BBC Report; Sky Report	Tries: Senior 21'; Mapapalangi 46', 80'; Mellor 66'; Goals: Weaver (3/4) 47', 68', 80'	Stadium: Odsal Stadium; Attendance: 6,786; Referee: Matty Lynn

Round 27: Sat 12 September	Huddersfield Giants	48–16	Castleford Tigers	Huddersfield
15:00 BST	Tries: Milne 11', 79'; Powell 26'; Wrench 31'; Gagai 35', 67'; Woolford 61'; Jagger 71'; Goals: Lolohea (7/8) 12', 27', 32', 37', 54 (p)', 62', 69'; Zenon (1/1) 80'; Sent off: Rogers (red card) 36'	BBC Report; Sky Report	Tries: Hood 17'; Asi 43'; Lane 75'; Goals: McNamara (2/3) 19', 44'	Stadium: Kirklees Stadium; Attendance: 5,376; Referee: Tara Jones

=== League table ===
Pos	Team	Pld	W	D	L	PF	PA	PD	Pts	Qualification
1	Wigan Warriors (L)	27	22	0	5	851	439	+412	44	Advance to Semi-finals
2	Leeds Rhinos	27	20	0	7	904	426	+478	40	Advance to Semi-finals
3	Warrington Wolves (Y)	27	20	0	7	726	465	+261	40	Advance to Eliminators
4	Wakefield Trinity (C)	27	19	0	8	709	486	+223	38	Advance to Eliminators
5	Leigh Leopards	27	17	0	10	644	497	+147	34	Advance to Eliminators
6	Hull Kingston Rovers	27	16	0	11	748	503	+245	32	Advance to Eliminators
7	St Helens	27	15	0	12	636	614	+22	30	
8	Toulouse Olympique	27	10	0	17	578	704	−126	20	
9	Catalans Dragons	27	10	0	17	537	802	−265	20	
10	York Knights	27	9	0	18	545	791	−246	18	
11	Hull FC	27	8	0	19	488	597	−109	16	
12	Huddersfield Giants	27	8	0	19	509	765	−256	16	
13	Castleford Tigers	27	8	0	19	464	866	−402	16	
14	Bradford Bulls	27	7	0	20	468	852	−384	14	

Updated to match(es) played on 12 September 2026. Source:
(C) Champions; (L) League Leaders' Shield Winners; (Y) Runners up

== Challenge Cup ==
Castleford entered the 2026 Challenge Cup in the third round, scheduled to be played in early February prior to the start of the Super League season. As a top flight club, they were guaranteed an away tie against non-Super League opposition. In the third-round draw on 12 January, Castleford were selected to face the winners of the second-round tie between Doncaster and Newcastle Thunder. They were drawn to play St Helens at home in the fourth round.

Third round: Sat 7 February	Doncaster	0–14	Castleford Tigers	Doncaster
14:00 GMT	Sin bin: Gwaze (yellow card) 36' to 46'	BBC Report; YP Report	Tries: Stimson 23'; Taaffe 50'; Goals: Weaver (3/3) 24', 51', 66 (p)'	Stadium: Eco-Power Stadium; Attendance: 2,537; Referee: Tom Grant

Fourth round: Sat 14 March	Castleford Tigers	8–32	St Helens	Castleford
18:00 GMT	Tries: Qareqare 47'; Golding 76'; Goals: Weaver (0/2)	BBC Report	Tries: Clark 5'; Murphy 7', 67'; Percival 31'; Paasi 72'; Feldt 78'; Goals: Hastings (3/5) 6', 8', 73'; Sailor (1/2) 80 (p)' Sin bin: Feldt (yellow card) 47' to 57'	Stadium: Wheldon Road; Attendance: 4,354; Referee: Aaron Moore
