= George Hirst (rugby league) =

English rugby league footballer

Personal information
- Born: 27 May 2001 (age 25) Batley, West Yorkshire, England
- Height: 6 ft 4 in (1.93 m)
- Weight: 17 st 5 lb (110 kg)

Playing information
- Position: Second-row, Prop
Club
Years	Team	Pld	T	G	FG	P
2023–24	Oldham	31	6	0	0	24
2025–26	Wigan Warriors	0	0	0	0	0
2025(DR)	→ Oldham	21	2	0	0	8
2026(loan)	→ Castleford Tigers	2	0	0	0	0
2026–	Castleford Tigers	16	1	0	0	4
	Total	70	9	0	0	36
- Source: As of 12 September 2026

George Hirst (born 27 May 2001) is an English professional rugby league footballer who plays as a second-row or prop forward for the Castleford Tigers in the Super League.

He has previously played for Oldham in RFL League One and the RFL Championship.

== Background ==
Hirst was born in Batley, West Yorkshire, England.

Hirst played junior rugby league for Dewsbury Moor between the ages of 9 and 15, initially as a winger or fullback. He then spent two years with Dewsbury Celtic, before returning to Dewsbury Moor to play open age. He briefly joined the Castleford Tigers development system on a one-month trial, but otherwise had no professional academy background.

He represented England Community Lions under-19s against Scotland, Wales and Australia.

Hirst attended Leeds Beckett University for two years, where he played on the rugby league team as a prop. Following the COVID-19 pandemic, he took a break from the game while considering his future, but later returned to the amateur scene with Almondbury Spartans in the Yorkshire Men's League.

== Playing career ==
=== Oldham ===
In November 2022, Hirst signed his first professional contract with RFL League One club Oldham, joining on a one-year deal from Almondbury Spartans. While playing part-time with Oldham, he worked as a delivery driver. He made his debut against London Skolars on 5 March 2023 and scored his first try against Cornwall on 7 May. In his first season with the Roughyeds, Hirst totalled three tries in sixteen appearances as a second-row or centre, and was voted third-place Supporters' Player of the Year. On 3 October, he signed a two-year contract extension with the club.

With Oldham having recruited former Super League players Jordan Turner, Joe Wardle, and Elijah Taylor in Hirst's positions ahead of 2024, he was not initially included in the starting line-up and had to earn his spot once again. From March, Hirst regained his place in head coach Sean Long's side and was described by The Oldham Times as "one of the brightest sparks" due to his "strong ball carries and hard-working playing style". He finished the year having made fifteen appearances and scored three tries as Oldham topped the table and won promotion to the RFL Championship.

=== Wigan Warriors ===
On 9 October 2024, Super League champions Wigan Warriors announced the signing of Hirst on a two-year deal, with an option for a further year in the club's favour. The move saw Hirst step up to a full-time environment, though he would also be available to his former side on dual registration for 2025. He was assigned squad number 34 and made a handful of appearances for Wigan's reserves, however spent the majority of the season with Oldham.

==== Oldham (DR) ====
Hirst returned to Oldham for their 2025 RFL Championship campaign on dual registration from Wigan. In his first season in the second tier, he made twenty-one appearances and scored two tries against Hunslet and York, as Oldham secured a fourth-placed finish and qualified for the play-offs.

=== Castleford Tigers ===
On 16 February 2026, Hirst joined Castleford Tigers on a one-month loan from Wigan. He made his Super League debut on 27 February in Castleford's victory against Huddersfield Giants, finishing as top tackler and earning praise from head coach Ryan Carr. Injury to Alex Mellor afforded Hirst an extended run as starting second-rower. After just his second game, Castleford announced the signing of Hirst on a permanent basis, agreeing a two-and-a-half-year deal. In April, he failed a head injury assessment against Hull and missed one week of action. On his return in round 11, Hirst scored his first try for the Tigers in their win against York Knights, though also received a two-match suspension after he was sin-binned for a high tackle. After failing a second HIA in July, Hirst was sidelined for three rounds under concussion protocols. He finished the year having made eighteen appearances.

== Club statistics ==
Appearances and points in all competitions by year
Club	Season	Tier	App	T	G	DG	Pts
Oldham	2023	League One	16	3	0	0	12
Oldham	2024	League One	15	3	0	0	12
Oldham	2025 (Note: Rejoined on dual registration from Wigan in 2025)	Championship	21	2	0	0	8
Oldham	Total		52	8	0	0	32
Wigan Warriors	2025	Super League	0	0	0	0	0
Castleford Tigers	2026 (Note: On loan from Wigan in February before joining permanently in March)	Super League	18	1	0	0	4
Career total			70	9	0	0	36

As of match played 12 September 2026
