= Jimmy Beckett =

English rugby league footballer

Personal information
- Full name: James Beckett
- Born: 29 August 1999 (age 27) England

Playing information
- Position: Prop, Loose forward
Club
Years	Team	Pld	T	G	FG	P
2019–21	Featherstone Rovers	5	0	0	0	0
2019(loan)	→ Keighley Cougars	5	0	0	0	0
2019{loan)	→ Oldham	6	1	0	0	4
2020{loan)	→ Oldham	4	1	0	0	4
2021{loan)	→ Dewsbury Rams	12	1	0	0	4
2022–24	Dewsbury Rams	68	6	0	0	24
2024–25	Featherstone Rovers	41	8	0	0	32
2026–	Castleford Tigers	3	0	0	0	0
2026(loan)	→ Goole Vikings	1	0	0	0	0
2026(loan)	→ Sheffield Eagles	3	1	0	0	4
2026(loan)	→ Batley Bulldogs	3	1	0	0	4
	Total	151	19	0	0	76
- Source: As of 3 November 2026

Jimmy Beckett (born 29 August 1999) is an English professional rugby league footballer who plays as a prop forward for the Castleford Tigers in the Super League.

He has previously played for Featherstone Rovers in the RFL Championship over two separate spells at the club. Beckett spent time on loan from Featherstone at the Keighley Cougars, Oldham and the Dewsbury Rams. He later joined Dewsbury on a permanent deal.

== Background ==
Beckett developed his rugby league career in lower leagues, earning a reputation as a powerful and hardworking front-row forward whilst at the Featherstone Lions.

== Playing career ==
=== Featherstone Rovers ===
Beckett spent multiple spells and established himself as a key forward, making 31 appearances and the 2025 season and helping the club reach the Championship play-offs and the 1895 Cup final.

He played on loan at the Keighley Cougars, Oldham and the Dewsbury Rams, gaining experience across Championship and League 1 competitions.

Beckett's performances with Featherstone in the Championship attracted attention from Super League clubs. His robust carries, defensive work rate and consistency made him one of the standout forwards in the second tier of English rugby league.

=== Castleford Tigers ===
In January 2026, Beckett signed with Castleford Tigers for the upcoming Super League season. The move marked his first contract in a full-time professional environment. Beckett expressed excitement about progressing his career at the top level and adapting to the demands of Super League football.

Castleford's director of rugby Chris Chester praised Beckett's work ethic and potential, noting that his strong 2025 campaign made him a valuable addition to the Tigers' forward pack.

In pre-season, Beckett linked up with his new teammates and began preparations for his Super League debut. Castleford's coaching staff highlighted his physicality and dedication during early training sessions.

==== Goole Vikings (loan) ====
On 1 April 2026, it was announced that he had signed for Goole Vikings in the RFL Championship on a short-term loan.

==== Sheffield Eagles (loan) ====
On 9 April 2026, it was announced that he had signed for Sheffield Eagles in the RFL Championship on loan.

==== Batley Bulldogs (loan) ====
On 3 June 2026, Beckett joined Batley Bulldogs in the Championship on an initial one-month loan. He scored the opening try on debut in Batley's 50–4 victory against Goole Vikings. After three appearances, he sustained a neck injury expected to rule him out for five to six weeks.

== Playing style ==
Beckett is known for his powerful carrying, high tackle count and work rate around the ruck, traits that helped him stand out in the Championship and earn a move to Super League. His physical presence in the front row offers Castleford greater depth and competition in the forward pack.
