= Joe Stimson =

Australian rugby league footballer

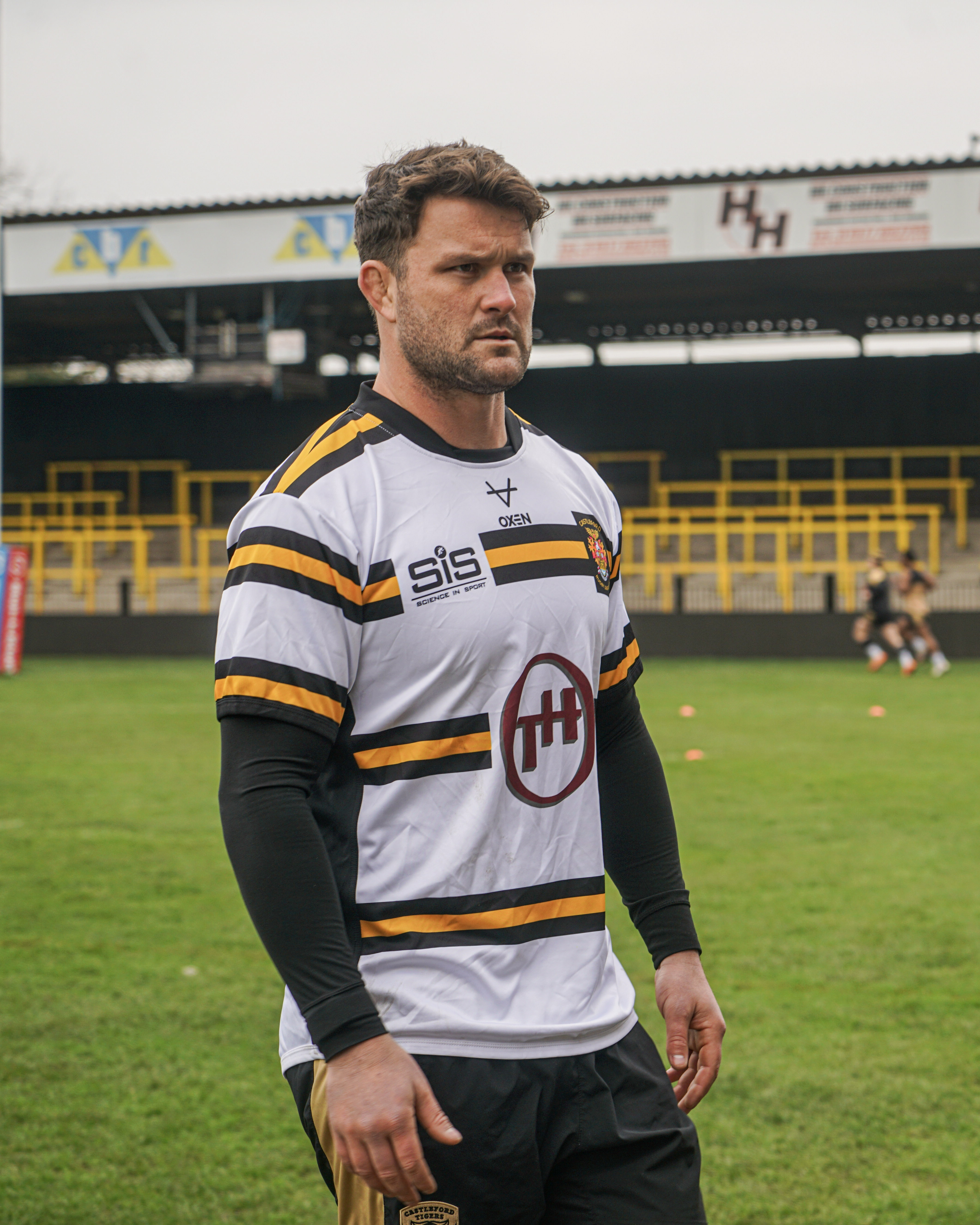

Personal information
- Full name: Joe Stimson
- Born: 2 December 1995 (age 30) Temora, New South Wales, Australia
- Height: 6 ft 2 in (1.89 m)
- Weight: 16 st 12 lb (107 kg)

Playing information
- Position: Prop, Second-row, Loose forward
Club
Years	Team	Pld	T	G	FG	P
2017–19	Melbourne Storm	51	9	3	0	42
2020–22	Canterbury Bulldogs	34	2	0	0	8
2023–24	Gold Coast Titans	29	2	0	0	8
2025–26	Castleford Tigers	39	2	1	0	10
	Total	153	15	4	0	68
- Source: As of 12 September 2026
- Relatives: Mark Stimson (uncle)

Joe Stimson (born 2 December 1995) is an Australian professional rugby league footballer who plays as a prop, second-row or loose forward forward for the Temora Dragons in Group 9 Rugby League.

He has previously played for Melbourne Storm, Canterbury-Bankstown Bulldogs and Gold Coast Titans in the National Rugby League, and for Castleford Tigers in the Super League.

== Early life ==
Stimson was born in Temora, New South Wales, Australia. He is the son of former South Sydney Rabbitohs player Peter Stimson and nephew of former Balmain and Wests Tigers player Mark Stimson.

Stimson played his junior rugby league for the Temora Dragons. He was educated at Mosman High School before being signed by the Melbourne Storm.

== Playing career ==
=== Early career ===
In 2014 and 2015, Stimson played for the Melbourne Storm's NYC team, captaining the side in 2015. In July 2015, he played for the New South Wales under-20s team against the Queensland under-20s team. In August 2015, he re-signed with the Storm on a 2-year contract until the end of 2017. In 2016, he graduated to the Storm's Queensland Cup team, Sunshine Coast Falcons.

=== 2017 ===
In round 2 of the 2017 NRL season, Stimson made his NRL debut for the Melbourne side against the New Zealand Warriors. A few days later, he re-signed with Melbourne on a two-year contract until the end of 2019.

=== 2018 ===
Stimson was part of the Melbourne team that played in the 2018 NRL Grand Final against the Sydney Roosters but lost 21–6.

=== 2019 ===
On 4 June, Stimson signed a three-year deal with the Canterbury-Bankstown Bulldogs from 2020.

In round 22, Stimson played his 50th NRL game for the Storm in their 18–22 loss to the Canberra Raiders at AAMI Park in Melbourne.

=== 2020 ===
Stimson made his debut for Canterbury-Bankstown in round 1 of the 2020 NRL season against arch rivals Parramatta. Canterbury would go on to lose the match 8–2.

On 29 April, Stimson was ruled out for the entire 2020 NRL season due to a shoulder injury which required surgery.

=== 2021 ===
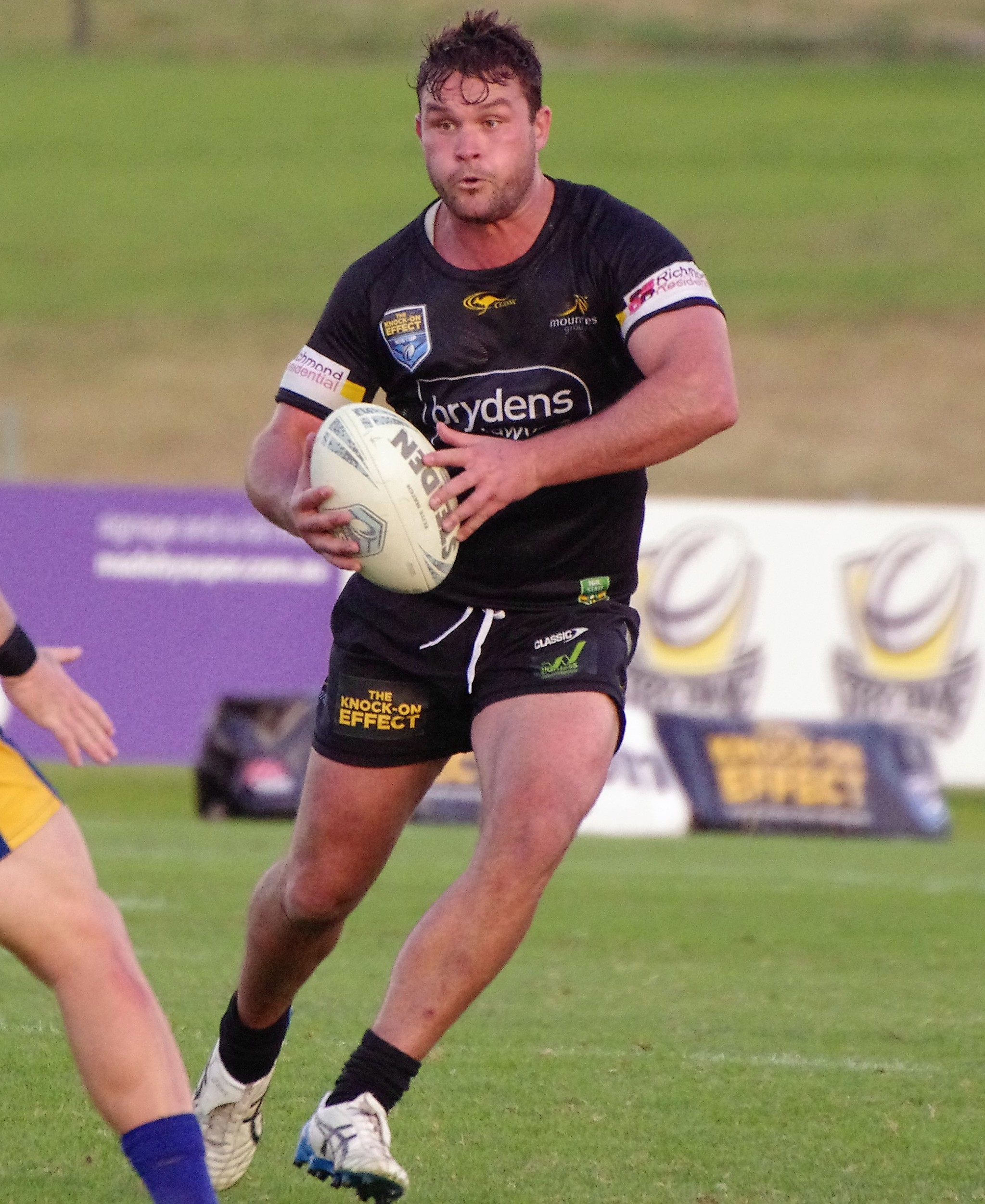
Stimson playing for the Mounties in 2021

Stimson played 11 games for Canterbury in the 2021 NRL season which saw the club finish last and claim the Wooden Spoon.

=== 2022 ===
Stimson made a total of 21 appearances for Canterbury throughout the 2022 season. The club would finish 12th on the table and miss the finals.

On 30 September, Stimson signed a two-year deal to join the Gold Coast starting in 2023.

=== 2023 ===
Stimson played a total of 23 matches for the Gold Coast in the 2023 NRL season as the club finished 14th on the table.

=== 2024 ===
Stimson was limited to only six matches for the Gold Coast in the 2024 NRL season as the club finished 14th on the table.

=== 2025 ===
Following his departure from the Gold Coast Titans, Stimson joined Brisbane Tigers in the Queensland Cup, while working in landscaping and maintenance.

On 23 June, Stimson signed for Castleford Tigers in the Super League on a one-and-a-half-year contract. He made his Tigers debut on 28 June against Wigan Warriors in round 16, and played a total of 11 games in the 2025 season as Castleford finished 11th on the table.

=== 2026 ===
Stimson was assigned squad number 13 for 2026. He scored the first try of Castleford's 2026 season, his first for the club, in their opening game against Doncaster in the Challenge Cup. In March, Stimson stepped up as interim captain for four rounds during the injury absence of Alex Mellor. He scored a try in round 14 against Catalans Dragons, touching down his own kick in behind, and kicked his first Super League goal in round 18 against Leigh Leopards. He missed one match due to a failed head injury assessment, though was otherwise ever-present and made twenty-eight appearances throughout the year.

On 9 September, Castleford confirmed that Stimson would depart the club at the end of the season upon the expiry of his contract. Despite reported interest from other Super League teams Leigh and Huddersfield, he returned to Australia and signed with the Temora Dragons.

== Statistics ==
Appearances and points in all competitions by year
Club	Season	Tier	App	T	G	DG	Pts
Melbourne Storm	2017	NRL	15	3	1	0	14
Melbourne Storm	2018	NRL	24	1	2	0	8
Melbourne Storm	2019	NRL	12	5	0	0	20
Melbourne Storm	Total		51	9	3	0	42
Canterbury Bulldogs	2020	NRL	2	0	0	0	0
Canterbury Bulldogs	2021	NRL	11	0	0	0	0
Canterbury Bulldogs	2022	NRL	21	2	0	0	8
Canterbury Bulldogs	Total		34	2	0	0	8
Gold Coast Titans	2023	NRL	23	2	0	0	8
Gold Coast Titans	2024	NRL	6	0	0	0	0
Gold Coast Titans	Total		29	2	0	0	8
Castleford Tigers	2025	Super League	11	0	0	0	0
Castleford Tigers	2026	Super League	28	2	1	0	10
Castleford Tigers	Total		39	2	1	0	10
Career total			153	15	4	0	68

As of match played 12 September 2026
