= Krystian Mapapalangi =

Australian rugby league player

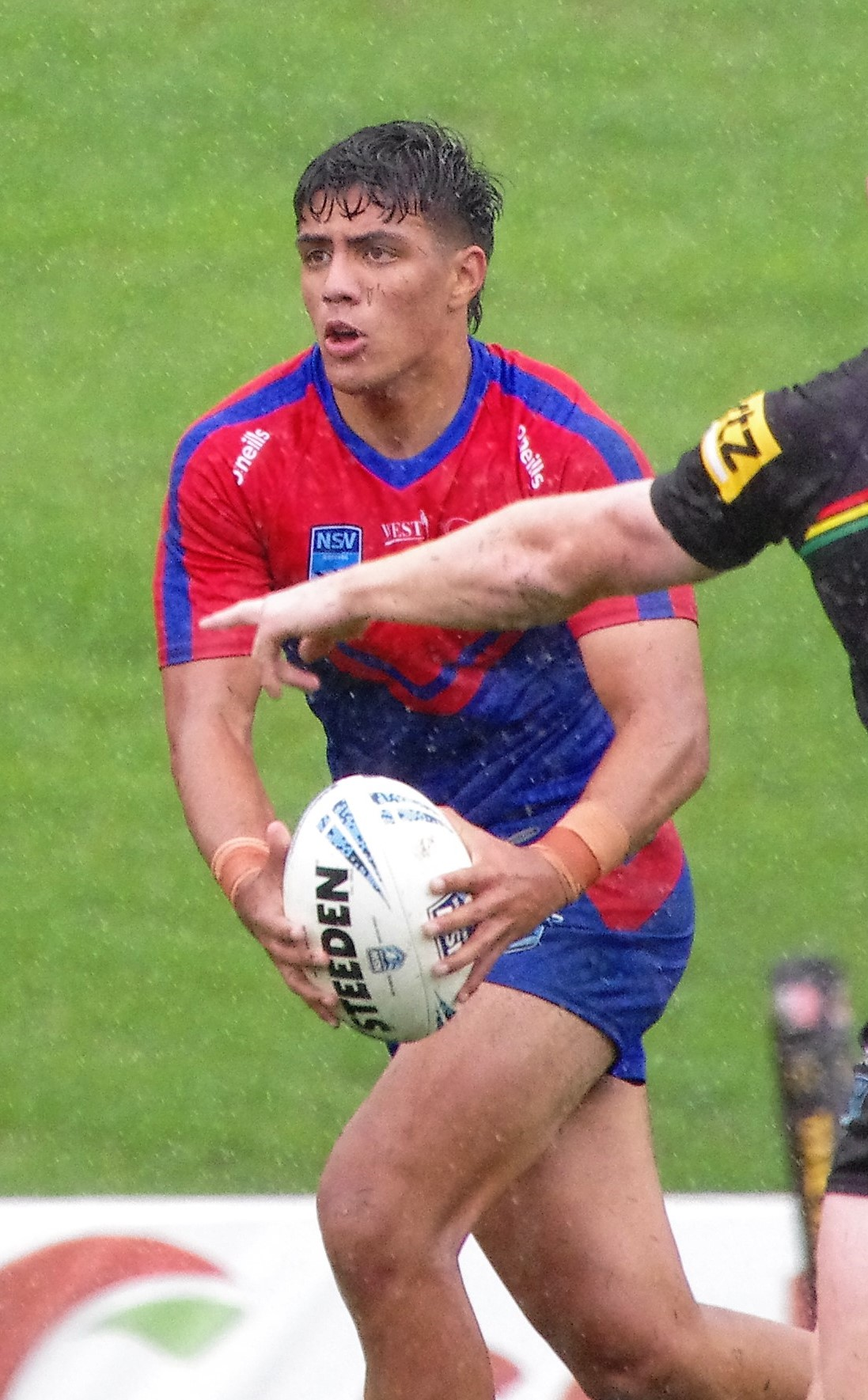

Personal information
- Born: 4 November 2002 (age 23) Burwood, New South Wales, Australia
- Height: 6 ft 1 in (1.86 m)
- Weight: 14 st 9 lb (93 kg)

Playing information
- Position: Centre, Wing
Club
Years	Team	Pld	T	G	FG	P
2022–24	Newcastle Knights	6	1	0	0	4
2025	Wests Tigers	0	0	0	0	0
2026–	Castleford Tigers	24	10	0	0	40
	Total	30	11	0	0	44
- Source: As of 13 June 2026

Krystian Mapapalangi (born 4 November 2002) is an Australian professional rugby league footballer who plays as a centre for the Castleford Tigers in the Super League.

He has previously played for the Newcastle Knights in the National Rugby League.

== Background ==
Mapapalangi was born in Burwood, New South Wales. He is of Tongan descent.

== Playing career ==
=== Early years ===
Mapapalangi played for the South Sydney Rabbitohs' Harold Matthews Cup team in 2018 and the S. G. Ball Cup side in 2019. In 2020, he joined the Manly Warringah Sea Eagles' S. G. Ball Cup team. Mid-way through 2021, he joined the Newcastle Knights.

=== 2022 ===
Ahead of the 2022 season, Mapapalangi signed a 2-year contract to be a development player with the Knights' NRL squad. In August, his contract was extended until the end of 2024 and upgraded into the top 30 squad. In round 23 of the 2022 NRL season, he made his NRL debut for the Knights against the Canberra Raiders.

=== 2024 ===
Mapapalangi played 4 matches for the Knights in 2024, after not playing any throughout 2023. He parted ways with the club at the end of the season.

=== 2025 ===
On 2 April, Mapapalangi had signed a train and trial contract with the Wests Tigers.

=== 2026 ===
On 22 January, Castleford Tigers announced the signing of Mapapalangi on a two-year deal. He made his debut against Doncaster in the Challenge Cup, and was named Tigers Man of the Match in the opening round defeat against Wigan Warriors. In round 2, he scored his first try and provided an assist for his winger Jason Qareqare against Toulouse Olympique. Mapapalangi failed a head injury assessment against St Helens in the cup and was thus ruled out for round 5, due to a late high tackle for which Kyle Feldt received a three-match ban. He provided three try assists for Qareqare against Bradford Bulls in round 6, earning praise for a "sublime performance". After scoring two tries to lead Castleford to victory against Wigan in round 8, head coach Ryan Carr reiterated his hope to agree a long-term contract with Mapapalangi.

== Statistics ==
Appearances and points in all competitions by year
Club	Season	Tier	App	T	G	DG	Pts
Newcastle Knights	2022	NRL	2	0	0	0	0
Newcastle Knights	2024	NRL	4	1	0	0	4
Newcastle Knights	Total		6	1	0	0	4
→ Newcastle Knights (R)	2021	NSW Cup	2	0	0	0	0
→ Newcastle Knights (R)	2022	NSW Cup	10	1	2	0	8
→ Newcastle Knights (R)	2023	NSW Cup	1	1	0	0	4
→ Newcastle Knights (R)	2024	NSW Cup	10	4	0	0	16
→ Newcastle Knights (R)	Total		23	6	2	0	28
Wests Tigers	2025	NRL	0	0	0	0	0
→ Wests Magpies (R)	2025	NSW Cup	15	5	0	0	20
Castleford Tigers	2026	Super League	15	8	0	0	32
Career total			59	20	2	0	84

As of match played 13 June 2026
