= Renouf Atoni =

New Zealand rugby league footballer

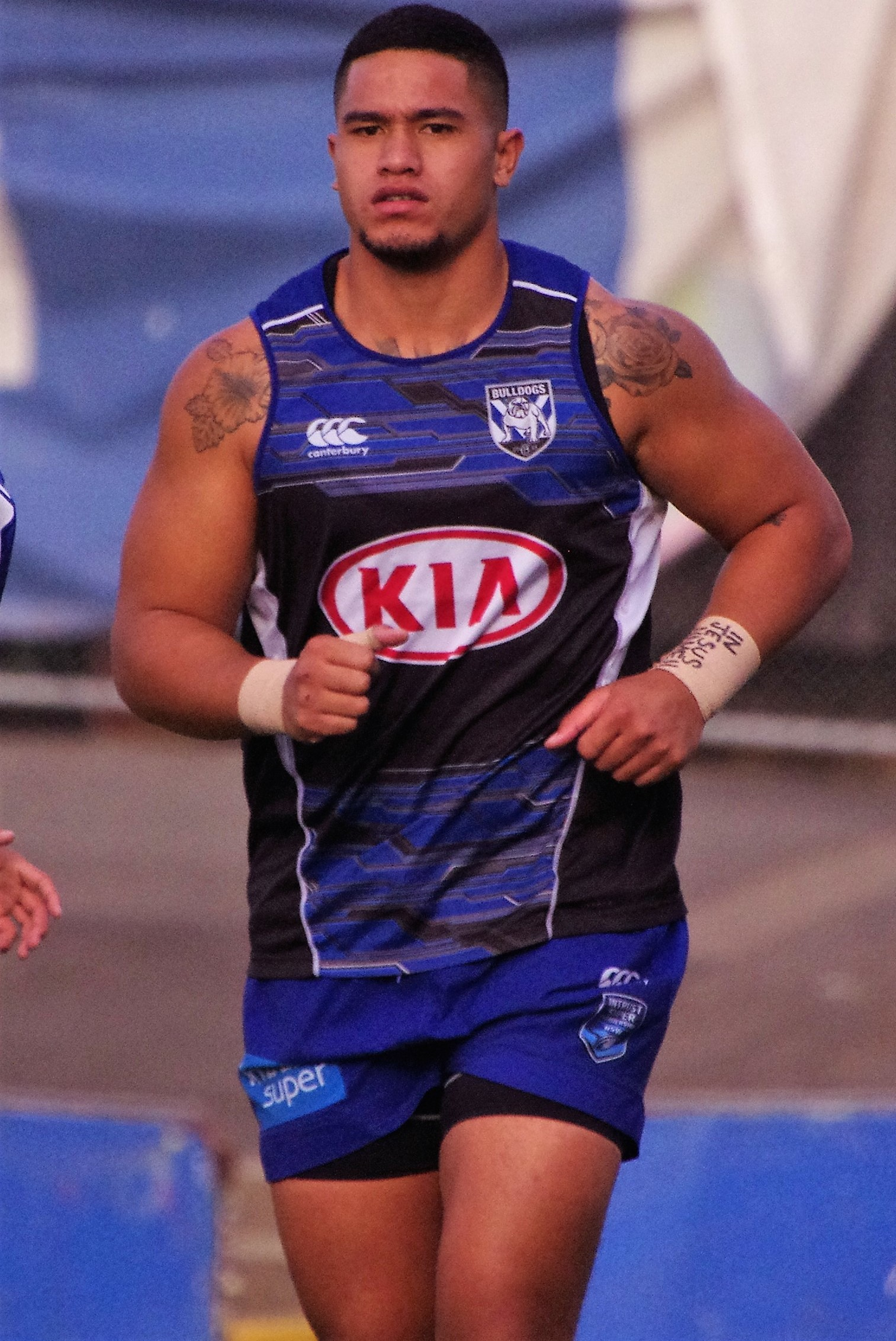

Personal information
- Full name: Renouf To'omaga-Atoni
- Born: Renouf To'omaga; 25 June 1995 (age 31) Porirua, New Zealand
- Height: 6 ft 3 in (1.90 m)
- Weight: 17 st 5 lb (110 kg)

Playing information
- Position: Prop, Loose forward
Club
Years	Team	Pld	T	G	FG	P
2018–21	Canterbury Bulldogs	43	3	0	0	12
2022	Sydney Roosters	0	0	0	0	0
2023–25	Wakefield Trinity	67	13	0	0	52
2026–	Castleford Tigers	26	2	0	0	8
	Total	136	18	0	0	72
- Source: As of 3 September 2026

Renouf Atoni (né To'omaga; born 25 June 1995) is a New Zealand professional rugby league footballer who plays as a prop or loose forward for the Castleford Tigers in the Super League.

He has previously played for the Canterbury-Bankstown Bulldogs in the National Rugby League (NRL), and for Wakefield Trinity in the Super League and the RFL Championship.

== Background ==
Atoni was born in Porirua, New Zealand. He is of Samoan (through Mother) and Tokelauan (through Father) descent.

His junior club was the Porirua Vikings.

== Playing career ==
2014: Renouf received the Holden Cup Player of the year at the Bulldogs.

2015: Renouf was in the 17 for the Junior Kiwis and played as a back row/prop.

=== 2018 ===
Atoni made his NRL debut in Round 10 against the Parramatta Eels.

On 23 September 2018, Atoni was part of the Canterbury side which defeated Newtown 18–12 in the 2018 Intrust Super Premiership NSW grand final. The following week, To'omaga was part of the Canterbury side which defeated Queensland Cup winners Redcliffe 42–18 in the NRL State Championship final.

In 2018, he was named in the Intrust Team of the Year at #10 prop.

=== 2019 ===
On 6 May 2019, Atoni was named in the Canterbury Cup NSW Residents team to play against the Queensland residents side.

=== 2020 ===
In round 2 of the 2020 NRL season, he scored his first try in the NRL as Canterbury-Bankstown were defeated by North Queensland 24–16 in front of an empty ANZ Stadium.

He made a total of sixteen appearances for Canterbury in the 2020 NRL season. The club finished in 15th place on the table, only avoiding the Wooden Spoon by for and against.

=== 2021 ===
In July 2021, Atoni signed a contract to join the Sydney Roosters starting in 2022.

=== 2022 ===
Atoni made no appearances for the Sydney Roosters during the 2022 NRL season. Atoni instead featured for the club's NSW Cup team North Sydney, playing a total of fourteen matches.

On 30 November, Atoni signed a one-year deal with English side Wakefield Trinity in the Super League.

=== 2023 ===
Atoni made his club debut for Wakefield Trinity in their 24–38 loss against the Catalans Dragons in round 1 of the 2023 Super League season.

Atoni played twenty-one matches for Wakefield Trinity throughout the year as the club finished bottom of the table and were relegated to the RFL Championship, which ended their 24-year stay in the top flight.

=== 2024 ===
In the 2024 RFL Championship season, Atoni played twenty-eight games in total as the club won the 1895 Cup, the league leaders shield and the RFL Championship grand final.

=== 2025 ===
Atoni starred for Wakefield Trinity to secure a 15–14 win in round 20 against Leeds, running for over 100 metres and making 25 tackles from the bench. Atoni played seventeen games for Wakefield Trinity in the 2025 Super League season as the club finished 6th and qualified for the play-offs. Atoni played in the club's elimination play-off loss to Leigh, which was also his final game for the club.

On 29 September 2025, Castleford Tigers announced the signing of Atoni on a two-year deal.

=== 2026 ===
Atoni was assigned Castleford's number 8 shirt for the 2026 season, and made his debut against Doncaster in the Challenge Cup. He scored his first try for the club in their round 11 win against York Knights. After Atoni missed round 14 ahead of the birth of his child, his performance the following week against Toulouse was praised by head coach Ryan Carr. He scored his second try in round 23 as Castleford defeated Hull FC 18–14. Having pulled out with an injury in the warm-up for round 26, he missed the final two games, finishing the year with twenty-six appearances.
