= Benidorm Bash =

Upcoming event

Benidorm
- Genre: Rugby league
- Begins: January 6, 2026
- Ends: January 10, 2026
- Locations: Benidorm, Alicante
- Country: Spain

Benidorm Bash is an upcoming rugby league festival to be held in January 2026 in Benidorm, Spain.

The festival follows Super League side Castleford Tigers's two-year deal to help grow the game in Spain. This began the year prior with a 2025 pre-season camp North of Benidorm which involved an exhibition match against local side Valencia Huracanes played in four quarters of 20 minutes, a game which Castleford won 50–8.

The 2026 festival will be a five day event featuring an opening party, a two-day nines tournament, a beach rugby event, and three 13-a-side games headlined by Castleford Tigers vs Oldham Roughyeds before a closing party.

Benidorm nines results

TBC

13-a-side results

9 January 2026

Alicante Cruzados	v	Kippax Knights

10 January 2026

Valencia Huracanes	v	TBA

10 January 2026

Castleford Tigers	v	Oldham Roughyeds

In December 2025, the event was cancelled.
