= Brock Greacen =

Australian rugby league player

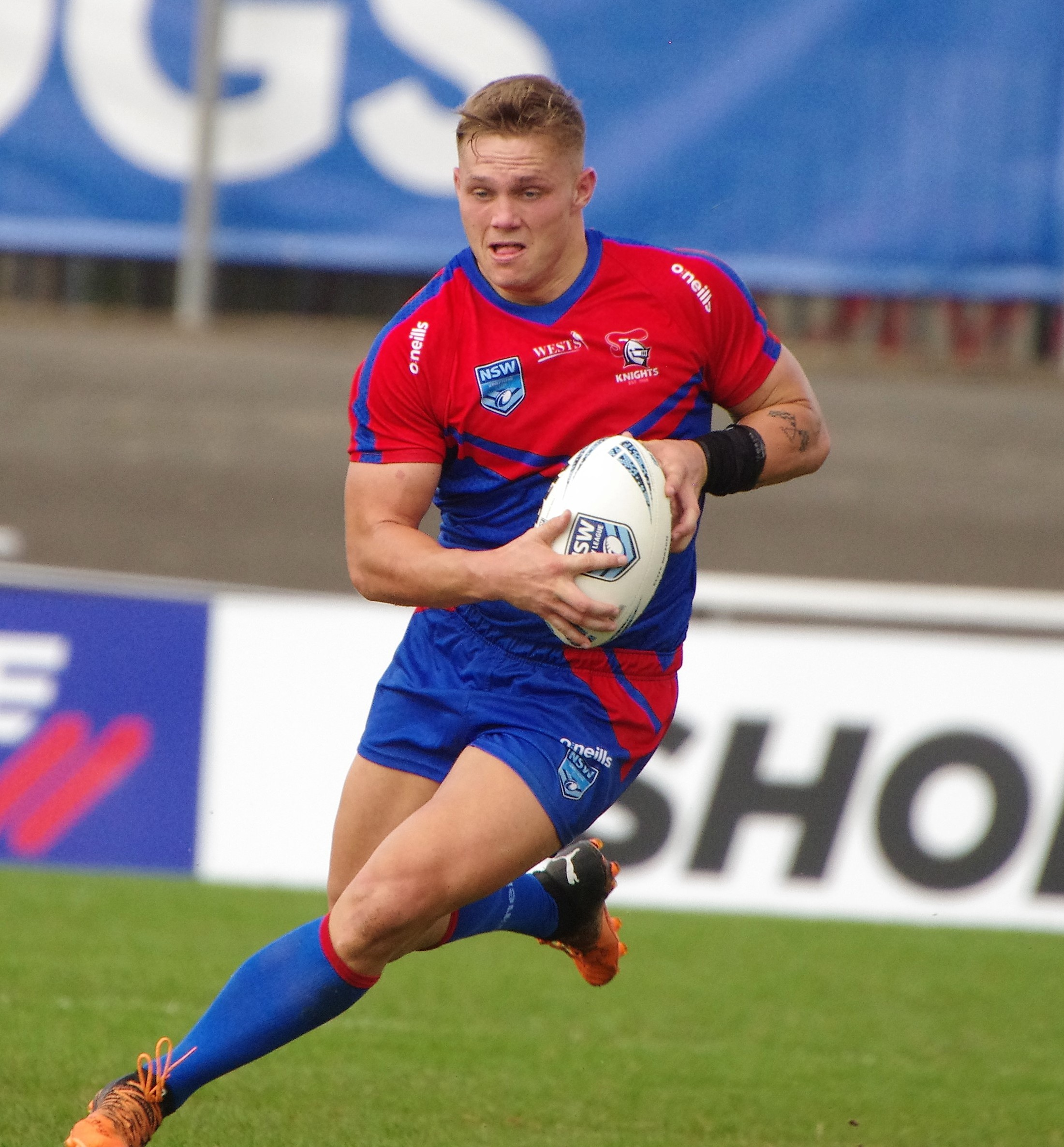

Personal information
- Born: 18 June 2002 (age 24) Denman, New South Wales, Australia
- Height: 6 ft 0 in (1.82 m)
- Weight: 15 st 4 lb (97 kg)

Playing information
- Position: Prop, Second-row
Club
Years	Team	Pld	T	G	FG	P
2025	Newcastle Knights	1	0	0	0	0
2026–	Castleford Tigers	14	2	0	0	8
	Total	15	2	0	0	8
- Source: As of 23 May 2026

Brock Greacen (born 18 June 2002) is an Australian professional rugby league footballer who plays as a prop forward for the Castleford Tigers in the Super League.

== Background ==
Born in Denman, New South Wales, Greacen played his junior rugby league for the Denman Devils, before being signed by the Newcastle Knights.

== Playing career ==
=== Early years ===
Greacen rose through the ranks for the Newcastle Knights, playing his first game with their NSW Cup team in 2022.

=== 2025 ===
In 2025, Greacen signed a train and trial contract with the Knights' NRL team. In round 15 of the 2025 NRL season, he made his NRL debut for the Knights against the Sydney Roosters.

On 31 July 2025, Castleford Tigers announced the signing of Greacen on a two-year deal from the 2026 season.

=== 2026 ===
Greacen was assigned Castleford's number 14 shirt for the 2026 season. He made his debut on 7 February against Doncaster in the Challenge Cup, however picked up a knock and was ruled out for four weeks. He scored his first try for the club in round 11 against York Knights, holding off a number of defenders to touch down for the winning try, and was named in the team of the week. The following round, he raced through a gap to score again in Castleford's victory against St Helens.
