= Mark Stimson (rugby league) =

Australian rugby league footballer

Personal information
- Full name: Mark Stimson
- Born: 7 May 1972 (age 54) Temora, New South Wales, Australia
- Height: 184 cm (6 ft 0 in)
- Weight: 104 kg (16 st 5 lb)

Playing information
- Position: Second-row
Club
Years	Team	Pld	T	G	FG	P
1996–99	Balmain Tigers	77	5	0	0	20
2000	Wests Tigers	15	1	0	0	4
	Total	92	6	0	0	24
- Source: As of 19 August 2019
- Relatives: Joe Stimson (nephew)

Mark Stimson (born 7 May 1972 in Temora, New South Wales, Australia) is an Australian former professional rugby league footballer who played for the Balmain Tigers and Wests Tigers in the 1990s and 2000s. Stimson played in the Turvey Park Lions premiership team in 1993.

== Playing career ==
A Temora Dragons junior, Stimson made his debut for the Sydney Tigers in 1996. After three games on the bench, he cemented a spot in the second-row, playing over 20 games a year there in his first three seasons.

After the 1998 season, and the retirement of captain Paul Sironen, Stimson was mooted as a potential captain for Balmain, and described as their "best forward of the past two seasons." However, an industrial accident in the off-season saw him lose toes when a 3-tonne slab of concrete fell on his foot. He said, "I was working in a trench so the plumber could lay pipes. I was trapped, buried up to my thighs. If I'd been stuck there longer, I may have lost a leg." Stimson didn't return to first-grade until round 12 of 1999.

He went on to play in 77 games for the club over the next four seasons. Stimson played in Balmain's final game as a stand-alone entity which was against the Canberra Raiders at Bruce Stadium in Round 26 1999. Balmain lost the match 42-14.

At the end of 1999, Balmain merged with Western Suburbs to form the Wests Tigers and Stimson was part of the inaugural side for the new franchise. Stimson played in the club's inaugural game which was against the Brisbane Broncos in Round 1 2000 at Campbelltown Stadium. He retired after the 2000 season.
