= Matthieu Laguerre =

France international rugby league footballer

Personal information
- Full name: Matthieu Laguerre
- Born: 3 February 1999 (age 27) Marseille, Bouches-du-Rhône, Provence-Alpes-Côte d'Azur, France
- Height: 6 ft 4 in (1.92 m)
- Weight: 14 st 5 lb (91 kg)

Playing information
- Position: Centre, Wing
Club
Years	Team	Pld	T	G	FG	P
2021–	Catalans Dragons	81	26	0	0	104
2023(DR)	→ Toulouse Olympique	8	0	0	0	0
	Total	89	26	0	0	104
Representative
Years	Team	Pld	T	G	FG	P
2021–	France	7	2	0	0	8
- Source: As of 30 August 2026
- Relatives: Benjamin Laguerre (brother)

Matthieu Laguerre (born 3 February 1999) is a French professional rugby league footballer who plays as a centre for the Catalans Dragons in the Super League and France at international level.

He has previously played for Saint-Esteve in the Elite One Championship.

== Background ==
Laguerre was born in Marseille, Bouches-du-Rhône, Provence-Alpes-Côte d'Azur in France.

Laguerre is the older brother of fellow French professional rugby league footballer Benjamin Laguerre, who plays for Toulouse Olympique.

== Career ==
In 2021 he made his Catalans debut in the Super League against Hull Kingston Rovers.
