= Tom Weaver (rugby league) =

Australian rugby league footballer

Personal information
- Full name: Thomas Weaver
- Born: 20 February 2003 (age 23) Tugun, Queensland, Australia
- Height: 5 ft 8 in (1.72 m)
- Weight: 12 st 2 lb (77 kg)

Playing information
- Position: Scrum-half, Stand-off
Club
Years	Team	Pld	T	G	FG	P
2023–25	Gold Coast Titans	11	0	10	0	20
2026–	Castleford Tigers	25	5	64	0	148
	Total	36	5	74	0	168
- Source: As of 3 September 2026

Thomas Weaver is an Australian professional rugby league footballer who plays as a scrum-half or stand-off for the Castleford Tigers in the Super League.

He has previously played for the Gold Coast Titans in the National Rugby League.

== Playing career ==
=== 2023 ===
Weaver made his NRL debut for the Gold Coast Titans in Round 25 against the Penrith Panthers in a 14–40 loss.

=== 2025 ===
Weaver was announced as one of eight players farewelled by the Titans.

On 24 October, he signed for Castleford Tigers in the Super League on a two-year deal. Weaver said, "I wanted to start and run my own team and be the half-back," an opportunity offered by Castleford in a reshaped squad.

=== 2026 ===
Weaver was assigned Castleford's number 7 shirt for the 2026 season, partnering Daejarn Asi in the halves. He made his debut against Doncaster in the Challenge Cup. In round 3 of Super League, Weaver scored two tries and kicked five goals in Castleford's win against Huddersfield. He contributed 16 points in their round 6 victory against Bradford Bulls, including a show-and-go try under the posts. His performance in the round 15 win against Toulouse saw him named in the Love Rugby League team of the week.

Weaver dropped out of the team in round 18, though on return the following week he was named Man of the Match and kicked the winning touchline conversion in the Tigers' comeback victory against first-placed Leeds. He featured sporadically in the final weeks of the season following Castleford's signing of Ben McNamara, finishing the campaign with a total of five tries and sixty-four goals as the Tigers slipped to a 13th-placed finish.

== Statistics ==
Appearances and points in all competitions by year
Club	Season	Tier	App	T	G	DG	Pts
Gold Coast Titans	2023	NRL	3	0	1	0	2
Gold Coast Titans	2024	NRL	3	0	0	0	0
Gold Coast Titans	2025	NRL	5	0	9	0	18
Gold Coast Titans	Total		11	0	10	0	20
→ Tweed Heads Seagulls (R)	2022	QLD Cup	2	0	0	0	0
→ Tweed Heads Seagulls (R)	2023	QLD Cup	16	2	1	0	10
→ Tweed Heads Seagulls (R)	2024	QLD Cup	10	3	0	0	12
→ Tweed Heads Seagulls (R)	2025	QLD Cup	11	1	2	0	8
→ Tweed Heads Seagulls (R)	Total		39	6	3	0	30
Castleford Tigers	2026	Super League	25	5	64	0	148
Career total			75	11	77	0	198

As of match played 3 September 2026
