= Alex Mellor =

English rugby league footballer

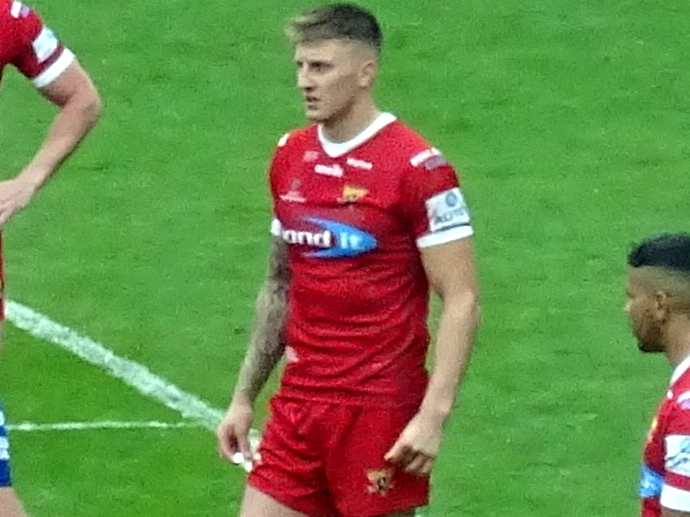

Personal information
- Full name: Alex James Mellor
- Born: 24 September 1994 (age 32) Halifax, West Yorkshire, England
- Height: 6 ft 3 in (1.90 m)
- Weight: 16 st 1 lb (102 kg)

Playing information
- Position: Second-row, Centre
Club
Years	Team	Pld	T	G	FG	P
2013–16	Bradford Bulls	51	9	0	0	36
2017–19	Huddersfield Giants	79	19	0	0	76
2020–22	Leeds Rhinos	34	4	0	0	16
2022(loan)	→ Bradford Bulls	1	0	0	0	0
2022–26	Castleford Tigers	113	16	0	0	64
2027–	Catalans Dragons	0	0	0	0	0
	Total	278	48	0	0	192
- Source: As of 12 September 2026

Alex Mellor (born 24 September 1994) is an English professional rugby league footballer who plays as a second-row forward or centre for Catalans Dragons in the Super League.

He has previously played for Bradford Bulls in the Super League and the Championship, and for Huddersfield Giants, Leeds Rhinos, and Castleford Tigers in the Super League.

== Background ==
Mellor was born in Halifax, West Yorkshire, England. Mellor is a talented cricketer and represented Yorkshire schoolboys until age 15, when rugby league became his chosen career.

== Playing career ==
=== Bradford Bulls ===
Mellor had been involved in the Bradford Bulls scholarship system from under-15s.

In the 2013 season, he featured in round 20 Warrington and round 27 against Huddersfield.

In the 2014 season, Mellor featured in the pre-season game against Hull FC. He featured in round 10 Wigan to round 13 Huddersfield then in round 21 against Huddersfield to round 23 Leeds. He played in round 27 London Broncos. He signed a new one-year deal with the Bradford outfit despite their relegation to the Championship.

In the 2015 season, Mellor featured in the pre-season friendlies against Castleford Tigers and Leeds. He featured in round 1 (Leigh) to round 4 (Hunslet Hawks) then in round 9 (London Broncos) to round 16 (Doncaster). Mellor played in the qualifier 3 against Salford to qualifier 4 against Widnes then in qualifier 7 Halifax. Mellor played in the Challenge Cup in round 5 Hull Kingston Rovers. Mid-way through the season, Mellor signed a two-year extension to his contract.

In the 2016 season, Mellor featured in the pre-season friendlies against Leeds and Castleford. He featured in round 2 (Whitehaven) to round 3 Swinton Lions then in round 5 Oldham to round 7 London Broncos. He played in round 10 (Dewsbury Rams) to round 13 against Swinton then in round 15 against Leigh. Mellor featured in round 17 (Workington Town) to round 21 Whitehaven then in round 23 Featherstone Rovers. Mellor featured in the Championship Shield game 1 Whitehaven to the final against Sheffield. Mellor played in the Challenge Cup in the 4th round against the Dewsbury club.

=== Huddersfield Giants ===
Following Bradford's liquidation before the 2017 season, he signed a three-year deal with Super League side Huddersfield.

Mellor featured in round 1 against Widnes to round 6 against Wigan.

=== Leeds Rhinos ===
On 17 October 2020, he played in the 2020 Challenge Cup final victory for Leeds over Salford at Wembley Stadium.

=== Castleford Tigers ===
On 21 June 2022, Castleford Tigers announced that Mellor would join the club with immediate effect, having signed a two-and-a-half-year deal. He made his Tigers debut later that week, in a golden-point win against Catalans Dragons at Wheldon Road. He scored his first try for the club against his former side Huddersfield on 19 August.

Ahead of the 2023 season, Mellor was assigned squad number 12 and also appointed Castleford vice-captain. On 12 May, playing as a centre, he scored two tries for Castleford in their 22–46 loss against Catalans Dragons. Three weeks later, at the 2023 Magic Weekend, he scored two tries in Castleford's 26–24 win against Leeds. Mellor made twenty-six appearances throughout the season as the club narrowly avoided relegation by finishing above Wakefield. He said, "We've massively underperformed as a team," and that looking forward, "There's a lot of improvements that need to happen across the board."

Mellor suffered a knee injury in a friendly against Keighley ahead of the 2024 season, forcing him to miss the opening two rounds. He displayed impressive form as the season progressed with Castleford director of rugby Danny Wilson praising his "tough line-running", and subsequently signed a two-year contract extension in May. On 12 July, Mellor scored two tries in the Tigers' round 17 win against London. At the end of the season, he was awarded Castleford Player of the Year.

While Castleford finished 11th in the 2025 season, Mellor's performances were praised by The Yorkshire Post which described him as "a shining light in the dark times" and "reliable, wholehearted and prepared to put his body on the line". He played twenty-six matches, registering the most minutes of any forward and topping metres gained for the Tigers. In May, he signed a contract extension until the end of 2027; director of rugby Chris Chester said, "He's been our most consistent player in the side this season and has shown extraordinary leadership on and off the field." He retained the Castleford Player of the Year award, as well as being named Players' Player of the Year.

Mellor was appointed club captain for the 2026 season by new head coach Ryan Carr, and spoke of his optimism following improvements around the club. He sustained a broken leg in round 2, however this didn't require surgery and he returned after five weeks. He was named in the team of the week in rounds 11 and 12 consecutively for his performances in Castleford's victories against York Knights and St Helens. On 11 September, Castleford confirmed that Mellor would depart at the end of the 2026 season to take up an opportunity with another Super League side.

=== Catalans Dragons ===
On 26 September 2026, it was announced that Mellor would join Catalans Dragons on a two-year deal from the 2027 Super League season.

== Club statistics ==
Appearances and points in all competitions by year
Club	Season	Tier	App	T	G	DG	Pts
Bradford Bulls	2013	Super League	2	0	0	0	0
Bradford Bulls	2014	Super League	8	0	0	0	0
Bradford Bulls	2015	Championship	15	0	0	0	0
Bradford Bulls	2016	Championship	26	9	0	0	36
Bradford Bulls	2022 (Note: Rejoined on loan from Leeds in 2022)	Championship	1	0	0	0	0
Bradford Bulls	Total		52	9	0	0	36
Huddersfield Giants	2017	Super League	28	3	0	0	12
Huddersfield Giants	2018	Super League	24	7	0	0	28
Huddersfield Giants	2019	Super League	27	9	0	0	36
Huddersfield Giants	Total		79	19	0	0	76
Leeds Rhinos	2020	Super League	13	2	0	0	8
Leeds Rhinos	2021	Super League	15	2	0	0	8
Leeds Rhinos	2022	Super League	6	0	0	0	0
Leeds Rhinos	Total		34	4	0	0	16
Castleford Tigers	2022	Super League	11	1	0	0	4
Castleford Tigers	2023	Super League	26	5	0	0	20
Castleford Tigers	2024	Super League	26	5	0	0	20
Castleford Tigers	2025	Super League	26	4	0	0	16
Castleford Tigers	2026	Super League	24	1	0	0	4
Castleford Tigers	Total		113	16	0	0	64
Catalans Dragons	2027	Super League	0	0	0	0	0
Career total			278	48	0	0	192

As of match played 12 September 2026
