= 2026 Super League season results =

2026 British rugby league results

The full fixture list was released on 27 November 2025, with the newly promoted York Knights playing at home to defending champions Hull KR in Round One. Hull KR's Round 3 fixture at home to Leeds Rhinos was played at the Allegiant Stadium in Paradise, Nevada as part of the 2026 edition of Rugby League Las Vegas on 28 February.

All times (including matches played in France and the USA) are UK local time; GMT (UTC±00:00) until 29 March, BST (UTC+01:00) thereafter.

== Regular season ==
=== Round 1 ===
Home	Score	Away	Match information
Home	Score	Away	Date and time	Venue	Referee	Attendance
York Knights	19–18	Hull KR	12 February 2026, 20:00	York Community Stadium	Liam Rush	8,500
Catalans Dragons	26–10	Huddersfield Giants	13 February 2026, 18:00	Stade Gilbert Brutus	Aaron Moore	7,252
Warrington Wolves	24–14	St Helens	13 February 2026, 20:00	Halliwell Jones Stadium	Liam Moore	15,064
Leigh Leopards	26–14	Leeds Rhinos	13 February 2026, 20:00	Leigh Sports Village	Tom Grant	9,603
Hull F.C.	27–20	Bradford Bulls	14 February 2026, 17:30	MKM Stadium	Marcus Griffiths	16,653
Wakefield Trinity	16–18	Toulouse Olympique	14 February 2026, 20:00	DIY Kitchens Stadium	James Vella	8,555
Castleford Tigers	16–26	Wigan Warriors	15 February 2026, 15:00	OneBore Stadium	Jack Smith	8,259

=== Round 2 ===
Home	Score	Away	Match information
Home	Score	Away	Date and time	Venue	Referee	Attendance
Bradford Bulls	28–10	Catalans Dragons	20 February 2026, 20:00	Odsal Stadium	Liam Rush	9,992
Leeds Rhinos	46–14	York Knights	20 February 2026, 20:00	Headingley Rugby Stadium	James Vella	15,232
St Helens	20–18	Leigh Leopards	20 February 2026, 20:00	BrewDog Stadium	Aaron Moore	13,203
Toulouse Olympique	24–12	Castleford Tigers	21 February 2026, 18:00	Stade Ernest-Wallon	Marcus Griffiths	5,176
Wigan Warriors	34–6	Hull F.C.	21 February 2026 20:00	Brick Community Stadium	Tom Grant	16,620
Huddersfield Giants	16–18	Wakefield Trinity	22 February 2026 15:00	Accu Stadium	Jack Smith	6,451
Hull KR	28–34	Warrington Wolves	18 August 2026, 20:00 (Note: Fixture rearranged to 18 August due to Rovers' World Club Challenge commitments.)	Sewell Group Craven Park	Liam Moore	11,785

=== Round 3 ===
Home	Score	Away	Match information
Home	Score	Away	Date and time	Venue	Referee	Attendance
Wigan Warriors	54–0	Leigh Leopards	26 February 2026, 20:00	Brick Community Stadium	Liam Moore	16,370
Castleford Tigers	34–8	Huddersfield Giants	27 February 2026, 20:00	OneBore Stadium	Matty Lynn	6,105
Hull F.C.	16–17	York Knights	27 February 2026, 20:00	MKM Stadium	James Vella	12,716
Warrington Wolves	27–12	Wakefield Trinity	28 February 2026, 17:30	Halliwell Jones Stadium	Liam Rush	10,094
Catalans Dragons	4–36	St Helens	28 February 2026, 18:00	Stade Gilbert Brutus	Aaron Moore	8,729
Hull KR	6–58	Leeds Rhinos	1 March 2026, 00:00 GMT (28 February 2026, 16:00 PST)	Allegiant Stadium (Note: Part of the 2026 Rugby League Las Vegas event.)	Jack Smith	45,719 (Note: this was the total attendance combined across all 3 games)
Bradford Bulls	18–6	Toulouse Olympique	1 March 2026, 15:00	Odsal Stadium	Scott Mikalauskas	8,777

=== Round 4 ===
Home	Score	Away	Match information
Home	Score	Away	Date and time	Venue	Referee	Attendance
Wakefield Trinity	14–10	Hull F.C.	5 March 2026, 20:00	DIY Kitchens Stadium	Aaron Moore	8,239
York Knights	30–38	Warrington Wolves	6 March 2026, 20:00	York Community Stadium	Liam Moore	6,210
Leigh Leopards	16–22	Catalans Dragons	6 March 2026, 20:00	Leigh Sports Village	Marcus Griffiths	8,090
Toulouse Olympique	16–36	Wigan Warriors	7 March 2026, 17:00	Stade Ernest Wallon	Liam Rush	5,497
St Helens	26–22	Bradford Bulls	7 March 2026, 17:30	BrewDog Stadium	Jack Smith	12,031
Leeds Rhinos	22–4	Castleford Tigers	8 March 2026, 15:00	Headingley Rugby Stadium	James Vella	15,301
Huddersfield Giants	6–32	Hull KR	8 March 2026, 15:00	Accu Stadium	Tom Grant	4,827

=== Round 5 ===
Home	Score	Away	Match information
Home	Score	Away	Date and time	Venue	Referee	Attendance
Wigan Warriors	23–22	York Knights	19 March 2026, 20:00	Brick Community Stadium	Marcus Griffiths	13,187
Toulouse Olympique	16–30	St Helens	20 March 2026, 18:00	Stade Ernest Wallon	Tom Grant	4,652
Wakefield Trinity	18–14	Leigh Leopards	20 March 2026, 20:00	DIY Kitchens Stadium	Chris Kendall	7,552
Bradford Bulls	26–14	Huddersfield Giants	20 March 2026, 20:00	Odsal Stadium	Aaron Moore	10,031
Warrington Wolves	72–6	Castleford Tigers	21 March 2026, 15:00	Halliwell Jones Stadium	Liam Rush	9,342
Catalans Dragons	26–20	Hull KR	21 March 2026, 17:30	Stade Gilbert Brutus	Jack Smith	8,156
Hull F.C.	24–16	Leeds Rhinos	22 March 2026, 15:00	MKM Stadium	Liam Moore	12,871

=== Round 6 ===
Home	Score	Away	Match information
Home	Score	Away	Date and time	Venue	Referee	Attendance
Castleford Tigers	40–28	Bradford Bulls	26 March 2026, 20:00	OneBore Stadium	James Vella	7,095
Hull KR	52–10	St Helens	27 March 2026, 20:00	Sewell Group Craven Park	Liam Moore	12,169
York Knights	14–26	Wakefield Trinity	27 March 2026, 20:00	York Community Stadium	Tom Grant	5,796
Wigan Warriors	16–34	Huddersfield Giants	28 March 2026, 15:00	Brick Community Stadium	Tara Jones	15,611
Leigh Leopards	21–20 (Note: after extra time)	Toulouse Olympique	28 March 2026, 17:30	Leigh Sports Village	Aaron Moore	7,834
Hull F.C.	24–20	Catalans Dragons	29 March 2026, 15:00	MKM Stadium	Liam Rush	12,123
Leeds Rhinos	26–22	Warrington Wolves	29 March 2026, 17:30	Headingley Rugby Stadium	Jack Smith	16,102

=== Round 7 (Rivals Round) ===
Home	Score	Away	Match information
Home	Score	Away	Date and time	Venue	Referee	Attendance
Hull KR	24–6	Hull F.C.	3 April 2026, 12:30	Sewell Group Craven Park	Aaron Moore	12,325
St Helens	34–24	Wigan Warriors	3 April 2026, 15:00	BrewDog Stadium	Jack Smith	17,918
Bradford Bulls	12–24	Leeds Rhinos	3 April 2026, 20:00	Odsal Stadium	Liam Moore	14,491
Huddersfield Giants	34–14	York Knights	4 April 2026, 15:00	Accu Stadium	James Vella	4,172
Warrington Wolves	42–6	Leigh Leopards	4 April 2026, 15:00	Halliwell Jones Stadium	Marcus Griffiths	11,026
Catalans Dragons	33–26	Toulouse Olympique	4 April 2026, 18:00	Stade Gilbert Brutus	Tom Grant	10,259
Castleford Tigers	0–34	Wakefield Trinity	5 April 2026, 15:00	OneBore Stadium	Liam Rush	9,455

=== Round 8 ===
Home	Score	Away	Match information
Home	Score	Away	Date and time	Venue	Referee	Attendance
Hull F.C.	14–24	St Helens	16 April 2026, 20:00	MKM Stadium	Liam Moore	12,148
Toulouse Olympique	0–46	Hull KR	17 April 2026, 18:30	Stade Ernest Wallon	Aaron Moore	6,135
Huddersfield Giants	22–56	Leeds Rhinos	17 April 2026, 20:00	Accu Stadium	Jack Smith	5,644
York Knights	6–18	Leigh Leopards	17 April 2026, 20:00	York Community Stadium	Tara Jones	5,214
Wakefield Trinity	52–12	Bradford Bulls	18 April 2026, 15:00	DIY Kitchens Stadium	Liam Rush	8,608
Catalans Dragons	38–22	Warrington Wolves	18 April 2026, 18:00	Stade Gilbert Brutus	Marcus Griffiths	9,525
Wigan Warriors	14–24	Castleford Tigers	19 April 2026, 15:00	Brick Community Stadium	James Vella	13,442

=== Round 9 ===
Home	Score	Away	Match information
Home	Score	Away	Date and time	Venue	Referee	Attendance
York Knights	38–14	Toulouse Olympique	23 April 2026, 20:00	York Community Stadium	James Vella	4,014
Leigh Leopards	30–16	Huddersfield Giants	23 April 2026, 20:00	Leigh Sports Village	Marcus Griffiths	7,603
Leeds Rhinos	46–4	Catalans Dragons	24 April 2026, 20:00	Headingley Rugby Stadium	Liam Moore	14,607
Warrington Wolves	23–6	Wigan Warriors	24 April 2026, 20:00	Halliwell Jones Stadium	Aaron Moore	13,218
Castleford Tigers	10–50	Hull F.C.	24 April 2026, 20:00	OneBore Stadium	Tara Jones	8,030
Bradford Bulls	12–48	Hull KR	25 April 2026, 15:00	Odsal Stadium	Chris Kendall	7,751
St Helens	18–12	Wakefield Trinity	25 April 2026, 17:30	BrewDog Stadium	Jack Smith	11,059

=== Round 10 ===
Home	Score	Away	Match information
Home	Score	Away	Date and time	Venue	Referee	Attendance
Hull KR	50–6	Castleford Tigers	30 April 2026, 20:00	Sewell Group Craven Park	Jack Smith	11,807
Leeds Rhinos	40–22	Wakefield Trinity	1 May 2026, 20:00	Headingley Rugby Stadium	Chris Kendall	15,135
St Helens	40–16	York Knights	1 May 2026, 20:00	BrewDog Stadium	Liam Rush	10,342
Wigan Warriors	38–14	Bradford Bulls	2 May 2026, 15:00	Brick Community Stadium	Aaron Moore	13,362
Catalans Dragons	18–33	Leigh Leopards	2 May 2026, 18:00	Stade Gilbert Brutus	Liam Moore	9,597
Huddersfield Giants	4–34	Warrington Wolves	2 May 2026, 20:00	Accu Stadium	James Vella	4,102
Hull F.C.	4–12	Toulouse Olympique	3 May 2026, 15:00	MKM Stadium	Matty Lynn	12,612

=== Round 11 ===
Home	Score	Away	Match information
Home	Score	Away	Date and time	Venue	Referee	Attendance
Huddersfield Giants	18–26	St Helens	14 May 2026, 20:00	Accu Stadium	Chris Kendall	3,624
Wigan Warriors	24–4	Leeds Rhinos	15 May 2026, 20:00	Brick Community Stadium	Liam Moore	14,627
Wakefield Trinity	58–10	Catalans Dragons	15 May 2026, 20:00	DIY Kitchens Stadium	Aaron Moore	8,532
York Knights	18–24	Castleford Tigers	16 May 2026, 15:00	York Community Stadium	Marcus Griffiths	6,077
Leigh Leopards	16–20	Hull KR	16 May 2026, 17:30	Leigh Sports Village	Jack Smith	9,028
Toulouse Olympique	16–24	Warrington Wolves	16 May 2026, 18:00	Stade Michel Bendichou	Liam Rush	4,683
Bradford Bulls	16–14	Hull F.C.	17 May 2026, 15:00	Odsal Stadium	Tara Jones	7,815

=== Round 12 ===
Home	Score	Away	Match information
Home	Score	Away	Date and time	Venue	Referee	Attendance
Hull KR	62–4	Wigan Warriors	21 May 2026, 20:00	Sewell Group Craven Park	Aaron Moore	10,246
Leigh Leopards	42–6	Hull F.C.	22 May 2026, 20:00	Leigh Sports Village	Liam Moore	8,260
Leeds Rhinos	52–0	Huddersfield Giants	22 May 2026, 20:00	Headingley Rugby Stadium	Jack Smith	14,132
Castleford Tigers	30–10	St Helens	23 May 2026, 15:00	OneBore Stadium	Liam Rush	7,721
Toulouse Olympique	18–22	Wakefield Trinity	23 May 2026, 18:00	Stade Ernest Wallon	James Vella	3,259
York Knights	22–36	Catalans Dragons	23 May 2026, 20:00	York Community Stadium	Matty Lynn	4,055
Warrington Wolves	26–12	Bradford Bulls	24 May 2026, 15:00	Halliwell Jones Stadium	Chris Kendall	9,306

=== Round 13 ===
Home	Score	Away	Match information
Home	Score	Away	Date and time	Venue	Referee	Attendance
Leeds Rhinos	24–16	St Helens	4 June 2026, 20:00	Headingley Rugby Stadium	Jack Smith	13,452
Warrington Wolves	12–4	Hull F.C.	5 June 2026, 20:00	Halliwell Jones Stadium	Ryan Cox	8,815
Bradford Bulls	30–20	York Knights	5 June 2026, 20:00	Odsal Stadium	Liam Rush	7,066
Castleford Tigers	14–24	Leigh Leopards	5 June 2026, 20:00	OneBore Stadium	Liam Moore	7,742
Huddersfield Giants	16–36	Toulouse Olympique	6 June 2026, 15:00	FLAIR Stadium (Note: game was played at Flair Stadium due to Huddersfield having the pitch re-seeded)	James Vella	3,517
Wakefield Trinity	26–24	Hull KR	6 June 2026, 16:30	DIY Kitchens Stadium	Aaron Moore	8,608
Catalans Dragons	16–40	Wigan Warriors	6 June 2026, 18:30	Stade Jean-Bouin (Note: Fixture held in Paris to commemorate 30 years of Super League and 20 years of Catalans Dragons in the Super League.)	Chris Kendall	12,525

=== Round 14 ===
Home	Score	Away	Match information
Home	Score	Away	Date and time	Venue	Referee	Attendance
St Helens	6–18	Warrington Wolves	11 June 2026, 20:00	BrewDog Stadium	Aaron Moore	11,590
Toulouse Olympique	24–48	Leeds Rhinos	12 June 2026, 18:00	Stade Ernest Wallon	Liam Moore	5,567
Wakefield Trinity	10–48	Wigan Warriors	12 June 2026, 20:00	DIY Kitchens Stadium	Marcus Griffiths	8,095
Hull KR	38–6	York Knights	12 June 2026, 20:00	Sewell Group Craven Park	James Vella	11,408
Hull F.C.	36–12	Huddersfield Giants	13 June 2026, 15:00	MKM Stadium	Tara Jones	12,057
Catalans Dragons	34–28	Castleford Tigers	13 June 2026, 18:00	Stade Gilbert Brutus	Liam Rush	7,222
Bradford Bulls	12–38	Leigh Leopards	14 June 2026, 15:00	Odsal Stadium	Jack Smith	8,010

=== Round 15 ===
Home	Score	Away	Match information
Home	Score	Away	Date and time	Venue	Referee	Attendance
Warrington Wolves	6–34	Leeds Rhinos	18 June 2026, 20:00	Halliwell Jones Stadium	Liam Moore	10,083
Hull F.C.	10–36	Wakefield Trinity	19 June 2026, 20:00	MKM Stadium	Aaron Moore	12,161
Hull KR	22–8	Leigh Leopards	19 June 2026, 20:00	Sewell Group Craven Park	Chris Kendall	11,625
York Knights	20–72	Wigan Warriors	20 June 2026, 15:00	York Community Stadium	Tara Jones	7,258
Catalans Dragons	34–24	Bradford Bulls	20 June 2026, 18:00	Stade Gilbert Brutus	Matty Lynn	8,122
Castleford Tigers	36–18	Toulouse Olympique	20 June 2026, 20:00	OneBore Stadium	Marcus Griffiths	7,439
St Helens	38–6	Huddersfield Giants	21 June 2026, 15:00	BrewDog Stadium	James Vella	9,851

=== Round 16 ===
Home	Score	Away	Match information
Home	Score	Away	Date and time	Venue	Referee	Attendance
Warrington Wolves	18–16	Catalans Dragons	25 June 2026, 20:00	Halliwell Jones Stadium	Marcus Griffiths	8,354
Leeds Rhinos	34–8	Hull KR	26 June 2026, 20:00	Headingley Rugby Stadium	Chris Kendall	18,456
Castleford Tigers	14–20	York Knights	26 June 2026, 20:00	OneBore Stadium	Ryan Cox	8,079
Hull F.C.	16–20	Wigan Warriors	27 June 2026, 15:00	MKM Stadium	Liam Moore	12,272
Toulouse Olympique	16–40	Leigh Leopards	27 June 2026, 17:00	Stade Ernest Wallon	Tara Jones	3,740
Bradford Bulls	10–40	St Helens	27 June 2026, 20:00	Odsal Stadium	Liam Rush	7,019
Wakefield Trinity	29–23	Huddersfield Giants	28 June 2026, 15:00	DIY Kitchens Stadium	Tom Grant	9,258

=== Round 17 (Magic Weekend) ===
Home	Score	Away	Match information
Home	Score	Away	Date and time	Venue	Referee	Attendance
Huddersfield Giants	24–36	York Knights	4 July 2026, 12:30	Hill Dickinson Stadium	Tara Jones	34,539 (Day 1)
Hull KR	26–12	Hull F.C.	4 July 2026, 15:00	Hill Dickinson Stadium	Marcus Griffiths	34,539 (Day 1)
Leigh Leopards	24–6	Warrington Wolves	4 July 2026, 17:30	Hill Dickinson Stadium	Liam Moore	34,539 (Day 1)
Catalans Dragons	18–60	Toulouse Olympique	4 July 2026, 20:00	Stade Pierre-Fabre	Liam Rush	5,483
Wakefield Trinity	48–6	Castleford Tigers	5 July 2026, 12:30	Hill Dickinson Stadium	Aaron Moore	42,903 (Day 2)
Leeds Rhinos	50–16	Bradford Bulls	5 July 2026, 15:00	Hill Dickinson Stadium	Tom Grant	42,903 (Day 2)
Wigan Warriors	16–14	St Helens	5 July 2026, 17:30	Hill Dickinson Stadium	Chris Kendall	42,903 (Day 2)

=== Round 18 ===
Home	Score	Away	Match information
Home	Score	Away	Date and time	Venue	Referee	Attendance
York Knights	20–16	Hull F.C.	9 July 2026, 20:00	York Community Stadium	Tara Jones	5,359
Huddersfield Giants	14–30	Bradford Bulls	10 July 2026, 20:00	Accu Stadium	Matty Lynn	3,969
Wigan Warriors	30–18	Warrington Wolves	10 July 2026, 20:00	Brick Community Stadium	Marcus Griffiths	16,621
Leigh Leopards	24–18	Castleford Tigers	11 July 2026, 15:00	Leigh Sports Village	Liam Rush	8,567
Hull KR	6–20	Wakefield Trinity	11 July 2026, 17:30	Sewell Group Craven Park	Chris Kendall	11,408
Catalans Dragons	6–28	Leeds Rhinos	11 July 2026, 20:00	Stade Gilbert Brutus	Liam Moore	7,867
St Helens	0–46	Toulouse Olympique	12 July 2026, 15:00	BrewDog Stadium	Aaron Moore	9,661

=== Round 19 ===
Home	Score	Away	Match information
Home	Score	Away	Date and time	Venue	Referee	Attendance
Bradford Bulls	12–26	Wakefield Trinity	16 July 2026, 20:00	Odsal Stadium	Marcus Griffiths	7,518
Huddersfield Giants	10–24	Wigan Warriors	17 July 2026, 20:00	Accu Stadium	Matty Lynn	3,391
St Helens	34–18	Catalans Dragons	17 July 2026, 20:00	BrewDog Stadium	Tom Grant	9,866
Warrington Wolves	34–12	Hull KR	18 July 2026, 15:00	Halliwell Jones Stadium	Liam Moore	10,025
Hull F.C.	22–32	Leigh Leopards	18 July 2026, 17:30	MKM Stadium	Aaron Moore	11,843
Toulouse Olympique	30–22	York Knights	18 July 2026, 20:00	Stade Ernest Wallon	Chris Kendall	3,450
Castleford Tigers	36–34	Leeds Rhinos	19 July 2026, 15:00	OneBore Stadium	Liam Rush	9,296

=== Round 20 (Rivals Round Reverse) ===
Home	Score	Away	Match information
Home	Score	Away	Date and time	Venue	Referee	Attendance
Hull F.C.	20–34	Hull KR	23 July 2026, 20:00	MKM Stadium	Chris Kendall	18,809
Wakefield Trinity	52–14	Castleford Tigers	24 July 2026, 20:00	DIY Kitchens Stadium	Tom Grant	9,158
Wigan Warriors	38–16	St Helens	24 July 2026, 20:00	Brick Community Stadium	Liam Moore	18,906
York Knights	22–24	Huddersfield Giants	25 July 2026, 15:00	York Community Stadium	Tara Jones	4,025
Leigh Leopards	28–12	Warrington Wolves	25 July 2026, 17:30	Leigh Sports Village	Marcus Griffiths	9,145
Toulouse Olympique	16–18	Catalans Dragons	25 July 2026, 20:00	Stade Ernest Wallon	James Vella	7,024
Leeds Rhinos	42–12	Bradford Bulls	26 July 2026, 15:00	Headingley Stadium	Aaron Moore	16,548

=== Round 21 ===
Home	Score	Away	Match information
Home	Score	Away	Date and time	Venue	Referee	Attendance
Huddersfield Giants	22–16	Hull F.C.	30 July 2026, 20:00	Accu Stadium	James Vella	4,215
Hull KR	40–16	Bradford Bulls	31 July 2026, 20:00	Sewell Group Craven Park	Tom Grant	12,126
Leeds Rhinos	46–0	Toulouse Olympique	31 July 2026, 20:00	Headingley Rugby Stadium	Tara Jones	15,249
Leigh Leopards	8–20	Wigan Warriors	31 July 2026, 20:00	Leigh Sports Village	Chris Kendall	10,265
Castleford Tigers	18–48	Warrington Wolves	1 August 2026, 15:00	OneBore Stadium	Liam Moore	8,802
York Knights	34–32	St Helens	1 August 2026, 17:30	York Community Stadium	Liam Rush	6,136
Catalans Dragons	12–32	Wakefield Trinity	1 August 2026, 20:00	Stade Gilbert Brutus	Aaron Moore	7,951

=== Round 22 ===
Home	Score	Away	Match information
Home	Score	Away	Date and time	Venue	Referee	Attendance
St Helens	18–32	Hull F.C.	6 August 2026, 20:00	BrewDog Stadium	Liam Rush	9,910
Castleford Tigers	0–44	Hull KR	7 August 2026, 20:00	OneBore Stadium	Marcus Griffiths	9,203
Leigh Leopards	22–14	York Knights	7 August 2026, 20:00	Leigh Sports Village	James Vella	8,249
Wakefield Trinity	22–24	Leeds Rhinos	7 August 2026, 20:00	DIY Kitchens Stadium	Liam Moore	9,258
Huddersfield Giants	42–20	Catalans Dragons	8 August 2026, 14:00	Accu Stadium	Tara Jones	8,394
Wigan Warriors	48–18	Toulouse Olympique	8 August 2026, 17:30	Brick Community Stadium	Tom Grant	16,889
Bradford Bulls	4–42	Warrington Wolves	8 August 2026, 18:30	Odsal Stadium	Aaron Moore	8,410

=== Round 23 ===
Home	Score	Away	Match information
Home	Score	Away	Date and time	Venue	Referee	Attendance
Hull KR	28–10	Catalans Dragons	13 August 2026, 20:00	Sewell Group Craven Park	Liam Rush	11,294
Leeds Rhinos	16–20	Leigh Leopards	13 August 2026, 20:00	Headingley Rugby Stadium	Chris Kendall	15,019
Warrington Wolves	30–10	York Knights	13 August 2026, 20:00	Halliwell Jones Stadium	Tom Grant	9,015
Hull F.C.	14–18	Castleford Tigers	14 August 2026, 20:00	MKM Stadium	James Vella	12,030
Bradford Bulls	6–34	Wigan Warriors	15 August 2026, 15:00	Odsal Stadium	Marcus Griffiths	7,561
Wakefield Trinity	16–46	St Helens	15 August 2026, 17:30	DIY Kitchens Stadium	Aaron Moore	9,258
Toulouse Olympique	10–26	Huddersfield Giants	15 August 2026, 20:00	Stade Ernest Wallon	Ryan Cox	3,070

=== Round 24 ===
Home	Score	Away	Match information
Home	Score	Away	Date and time	Venue	Referee	Attendance
Leigh Leopards	62–10	Bradford Bulls	21 August 2026, 20:00	Leigh Sports Village	Liam Rush	8,045
Wigan Warriors	26–12	Wakefield Trinity	21 August 2026, 20:00	Brick Community Stadium	Chris Kendall	15,652
St Helens	36–12	Castleford Tigers	22 August 2026, 15:00	BrewDog Stadium	Tom Grant	10,188
Hull KR	12–32	Toulouse Olympique	22 August 2026, 17:30	Sewell Group Craven Park	Matty Lynn	11,798
Catalans Dragons	26–27	Hull F.C.	22 August 2026, 20:00	Stade Gilbert Brutus	Tara Jones	9,521
Warrington Wolves	34–24	Huddersfield Giants	23 August 2026, 15:00	Halliwell Jones Stadium	Marcus Griffiths	10,034
York Knights	16–66	Leeds Rhinos	23 August 2026, 15:00	York Community Stadium	Liam Moore	8,251

=== Round 25 ===
Home	Score	Away	Match information
Home	Score	Away	Date and time	Venue	Referee	Attendance
Wigan Warriors	46–0	Hull KR	27 August 2026, 20:02 (Note: match kicked off at 8.02pm as a sign of homage to Sir Billy Boston's iconic #2 shirt.)	Brick Community Stadium	Aaron Moore	16,847
Castleford Tigers	6–34	Catalans Dragons	28 August 2026, 20:00	OneBore Stadium	James Vella	9,255
Huddersfield Giants	30–18	Leigh Leopards	28 August 2026, 20:00	Accu Stadium	Tara Jones	4,156
St Helens	6–34	Leeds Rhinos	28 August 2026, 20:00	BrewDog Stadium	Marcus Griffiths	11,558
Wakefield Trinity	28–12	York Knights	29 August 2026, 15:00	DIY Kitchens Stadium	Liam Rush	7,982
Hull F.C.	14–16	Warrington Wolves	29 August 2026, 17:30	MKM Stadium	Chris Kendall	12,255
Toulouse Olympique	28–18	Bradford Bulls	29 August 2026, 20:00	Stade Ernest Wallon	Matty Lynn	3,743

=== Round 26 ===
Home	Score	Away	Match information
Home	Score	Away	Date and time	Venue	Referee	Attendance
Bradford Bulls	32–22	Castleford Tigers	3 September 2026, 20:00	Odsal Stadium	Matty Lynn	6,786
Toulouse Olympique	44–30	Hull F.C.	4 September 2026, 18:00	Stade Ernest Wallon	Liam Rush	7,360
Hull KR	36–6	Huddersfield Giants	4 September 2026, 20:00	Sewell Group Craven Park	Marcus Griffiths	11,787
Leigh Leopards	48–10	St Helens	4 September 2026, 20:00	Leigh Sports Village	Chris Kendall	9,589
Wakefield Trinity	25–18	Warrington Wolves	5 September 2026, 15:00	DIY Kitchens Stadium	Aaron Moore	9,057
Catalans Dragons	16–28	York Knights	5 September 2026, 17:00	Stade Gilbert Brutus	Tom Grant	9,052
Leeds Rhinos	8–40	Wigan Warriors	5 September 2026, 20:00	Headingley Rugby Stadium	Liam Moore	19,698

=== Round 27 ===
Home	Score	Away	Match information
Home	Score	Away	Date and time	Venue	Referee	Attendance
York Knights	35–16	Bradford Bulls	10 September 2026, 20:00	York Community Stadium	Chris Kendall	5,136
Leeds Rhinos	12–18	Hull F.C.	11 September 2026, 20:00	Headingley Rugby Stadium	Aaron Moore	16,042
Leigh Leopards	8–19	Wakefield Trinity	11 September 2026, 20:00	Leigh Sports Village	Liam Moore	8,868
St Helens	36–12	Hull KR	11 September 2026, 20:00	BrewDog Stadium	Matty Lynn	10,717
Warrington Wolves	26–14	Toulouse Olympique	11 September 2026, 20:00	Halliwell Jones Stadium	Tom Grant	10,667
Wigan Warriors	50–12	Catalans Dragons	11 September 2026, 20:00	Brick Community Stadium	Marcus Griffiths	19,049
Huddersfield Giants	48–16	Castleford Tigers	12 September 2026, 15:00	Accu Stadium	Tara Jones	5,376

== Play-offs ==
=== Summary ===
Home	Score	Away	Match Information
Home	Score	Away	Date	Venue	Referee	Attendance
Eliminators
Wakefield Trinity	26–16	Leigh Leopards	18 September 2026, 20:00	DIY Kitchens Stadium	Chris Kendall	9,258
Warrington Wolves	35–12	Hull KR	19 September 2026 17:30	Halliwell Jones Stadium	Aaron Moore	11,073
Semi-finals
Leeds Rhinos	12–14	Warrington Wolves	25 September 2026, 20:00	Headingley	Chris Kendall	16,626
Wigan Warriors	6–33	Wakefield Trinity	26 September 2026, 17:30	Brick Community Stadium	Liam Moore	16,724
Grand Final
Warrington Wolves	10–23	Wakefield Trinity	3 October 2026, 18:00	Old Trafford	Liam Moore	71,728
