= Tom Forber =

English rugby league footballer

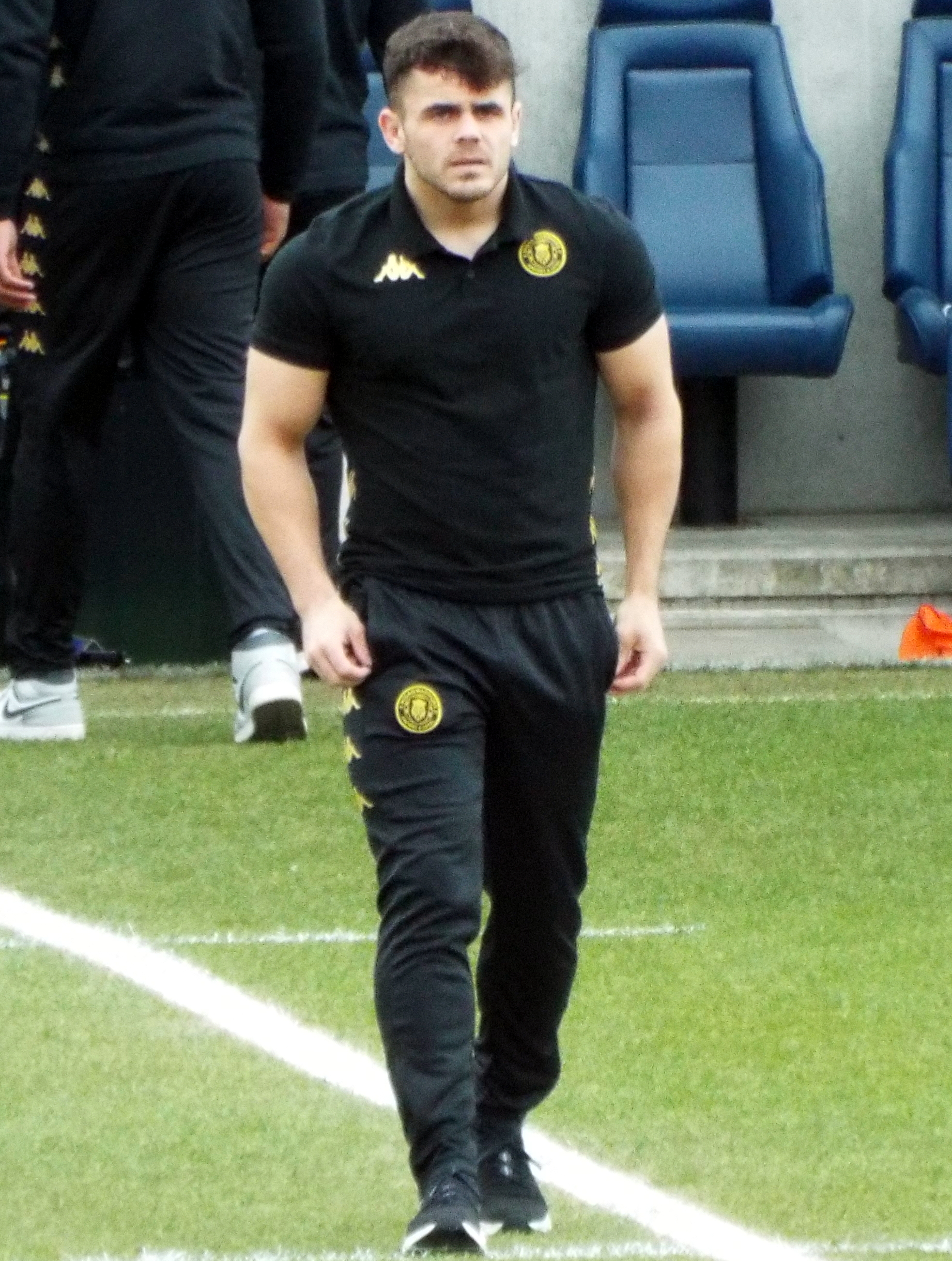

Personal information
- Full name: Thomas Forber
- Born: 22 May 2003 (age 23) Orford, Warrington, Cheshire, England

Playing information
- Position: Hooker
Club
Years	Team	Pld	T	G	FG	P
2022–26	Wigan Warriors	22	3	0	0	12
2022(loan)	→ Oldham	3	1	0	0	4
2022(loan)	→ Newcastle Thunder	6	1	0	0	4
2023(loan)	→ Whitehaven	2	0	0	0	0
2023(loan)	→ Wakefield Trinity	2	0	0	0	0
2023(loan)	→ Widnes Vikings	8	0	0	0	0
2023(loan)	→ Oldham	1	0	0	0	0
2024(loan)	→ Barrow Raiders	7	1	0	0	4
2025(DR)	→ Oldham	5	0	0	0	0
2026(loan)	→ Castleford Tigers	2	0	0	0	0
2026(loan)	→ Barrow Raiders	3	0	0	0	0
2026(loan)	→ Oldham	7	1	0	0	4
2027–	St Helens	0	0	0	0	0
	Total	68	7	0	0	28
- Source: As of 10 November 2026

Tom Forber is an English professional rugby league footballer who plays as a hooker for the St Helens in the Super League.

He has spent time on loan or dual registration from Wigan at Wakefield Trinity and Castleford Tigers in the Super League, at Newcastle Thunder, Whitehaven, Widnes Vikings, Barrow Raiders and Oldham in the RFL Championship, and at Oldham in League 1.

== Playing career ==
=== Wigan Warriors ===
In 2022, Forber made his Super League debut for the Wigan Warriors against Hull Kingston Rovers.

On 12 October 2024, Forber played in Wigan's 9–2 2024 Super League Grand Final victory over Hull Kingston Rovers.

In July 2025, Forber signed a new four-year deal with the club.

==== Barrow Raiders (loan) ====
On 27 March 2024, it was reported that he had signed for Barrow Raiders in the RFL Championship on short-term loan.

==== Oldham RLFC (DR) ====
On 16 April 2025, it was reported that he had signed for Oldham RLFC in the RFL Championship on DR loan.

==== Castleford Tigers (loan) ====
On 24 March 2026, Castleford Tigers announced the signing of Forber on a one-month loan deal. He made his debut in Castleford's round 6 victory against Bradford, earning a place in the Super League Team of the Week. After his second appearance, Forber was recalled to parent club Wigan.

=== Oldham RLFC (loan) ===
On 16 July 2026 it was reported that he had rejoined Oldham RLFC in the RFL Championship on loan until the end of the 2026 season

=== St Helens RFC ===
On 9 November 2026 it was reported that he had signed for St Helens in the Super League on a 3-year deal.
