= Valencia Huracanes =

Spanish rugby league club, based in Valencia

Club information
- Full name: Valencia Huracanes
- Colours: Blue and Orange
- Founded: 2019; 6 years ago
- Website: https://valenciahuracanes.com/dir/?lang=en

Current details
- Ground: Estadio de Rugby, Villajoyosa (3,000)
- Chairman: Dean Buchan
- Coach: Adrien Frigola
- Competition: Espana Rugby League

Uniforms
Home colours

The Valencia Huracanes or Los Huracanes are a Spanish rugby league club, based in Valencia. They have applied to join the Rugby Football League's League 1 competition. During 2020 they have exhibition matches scheduled and will compete in the Espana Rugby league with a focus on developing Spanish players. They were announced as one of the teams comprising the inaugural Euro XIII Cup competition in 2022.

== History ==
The club was first formed in 2019 by Dean Buchan, an English businessman who formed a consortium which submitted a proposal to compete in Rugby Football League competition. Their goal for 2020 is to form a competitive squad to be able to compete in 2021 in League One. They planned to stage a double header with Super League XXIV finalists St. Helens and Salford Red Devils but that fell through and they instead hosted a standalone fixture against Featherstone Rovers, which they lost 102–14. A number of other fixtures against English clubs were planned through 2020, but never occurred due to the COVID-19 pandemic.

== See also ==
- Spanish Rugby League Association
- Spain national rugby league team
- Rugby Football League expansion
