= Phoenix Laulu-Togaga'e =

Australian rugby league player (b.2003)

Personal information
- Born: 16 April 2003 (age 23) Brisbane, Queensland, Australia

Playing information
- Position: Fullback, Wing
Club
Years	Team	Pld	T	G	FG	P
2021	Keighley Cougars	12	5	0	0	20
2022–25	Hull Kingston Rovers	9	0	0	0	0
2022(DR)	→ Dewsbury Rams	2	1	0	0	4
2022(loan)	→ Rochdale Hornets	1	0	0	0	0
2023(loan)	→ Keighley Cougars	4	0	0	0	0
2024(loan)	→ Oldham	18	15	0	0	60
2025(loan)	→ Oldham	28	14	0	0	56
2026	Catalans Dragons	7	3	0	0	12
2026–	Castleford Tigers	15	4	0	0	16
	Total	96	42	0	0	168
- Source: As of 22 August 2026
- Father: Quentin Laulu-Togaga'e

Phoenix Laulu-Togaga'e (born 16 April 2003) is a professional rugby league footballer who plays at fullback or winger for the Castleford Tigers in the Super League.

He has previously played for Hull Kingston Rovers and Catalans Dragons in the Super League, and for Keighley Cougars in League One. He has spent time on loan or dual registration at Dewsbury Rams, Keighley and Oldham in the RFL Championship, and at Rochdale Hornets and Oldham in League One.

== Background ==
Laulu-Togaga'e was born in Brisbane, Australia and moved to the United Kingdom when he was seven. He is the son of Samoan international rugby league footballer Quentin Laulu-Togaga'e. At school, Laulu-Togaga'e played rugby union and was member of the academy side at Leicester Tigers.

== Playing career ==
=== Keighley Cougars ===
With the Leicester Tigers academy side suspended due to the COVID-19 pandemic, Laulu-Togaga'e was invited to train with Keighley Cougars, for whom his father Quentin played. Keighley were impressed with Phoenix and, in March 2021, the club signed him on a one-year contract. After playing in a pre-season game, Laulu-Togaga'e made his professional debut for Keighley against West Wales Raiders on 13 June 2021. His father played in the same match and, when Phoenix came on as an interchange player, they became the first instance of father and son playing in the same professional match since 2013 and only the third father-son pairing ever. (Note: The last father-son pairing were Brad Hepi and Tyla Hepi for Gloucestershire All Golds, while the only other recorded instance was in 1924 when Ed "Tedda" Courtney and his son Ed Jr. played for Western Suburbs Magpies. A fourth father-son pairing occurred in 2022 when George Flanagan and George Jr appeared for Bradford Bulls.)

=== Hull Kingston Rovers ===
After playing a handful of games for Keighley, Laulu-Togaga'e was spotted by Super League side Hull Kingston Rovers and was signed on a two-year contract in August 2021 but was loaned back to Keighley for the remainder of the 2021 season.

At the end of the 2021 season, Laulu-Togaga'e had made 12 appearances for Keighley, scoring five tries, and won the Rugby Football League's League 1 Young Player of the Year award.

Laulu-Togaga'e made his Super League debut for Hull Kingston Rovers on 25 February 2022 as an interchange player during Rovers' 26–10 victory over Castleford Tigers.

==== Dewsbury Rams (loan) ====
The following week, he appeared for Championship side Dewsbury Rams with whom Hull Kingston Rovers have a dual registration agreement for the 2022 season.

==== Rochdale Hornets (loan) ====
Laulu-Togaga'e also had a period on loan at Rochdale Hornets in 2022.

==== Oldham R.L.F.C. (loan) ====
On 15 March 2024, he signed for Oldham R.L.F.C. in League One on season-long loan.

On 17 October 2024, the loan period was extended, with him remaining at Oldham RLFC for the duration of the 2025 season.

=== Catalans Dragons ===
On 24 October 2025, he signed for the Catalans Dragons in the Super League on a one-year deal for the 2026 season.

=== Castleford Tigers ===
On 27 April 2026, it was confirmed that Laulu-Togaga'e had signed a three-and-a-half-year deal to play for Castleford Tigers in the Super League.
