= Benjamin Laguerre =

France international rugby league footballer

Ben Laguerre
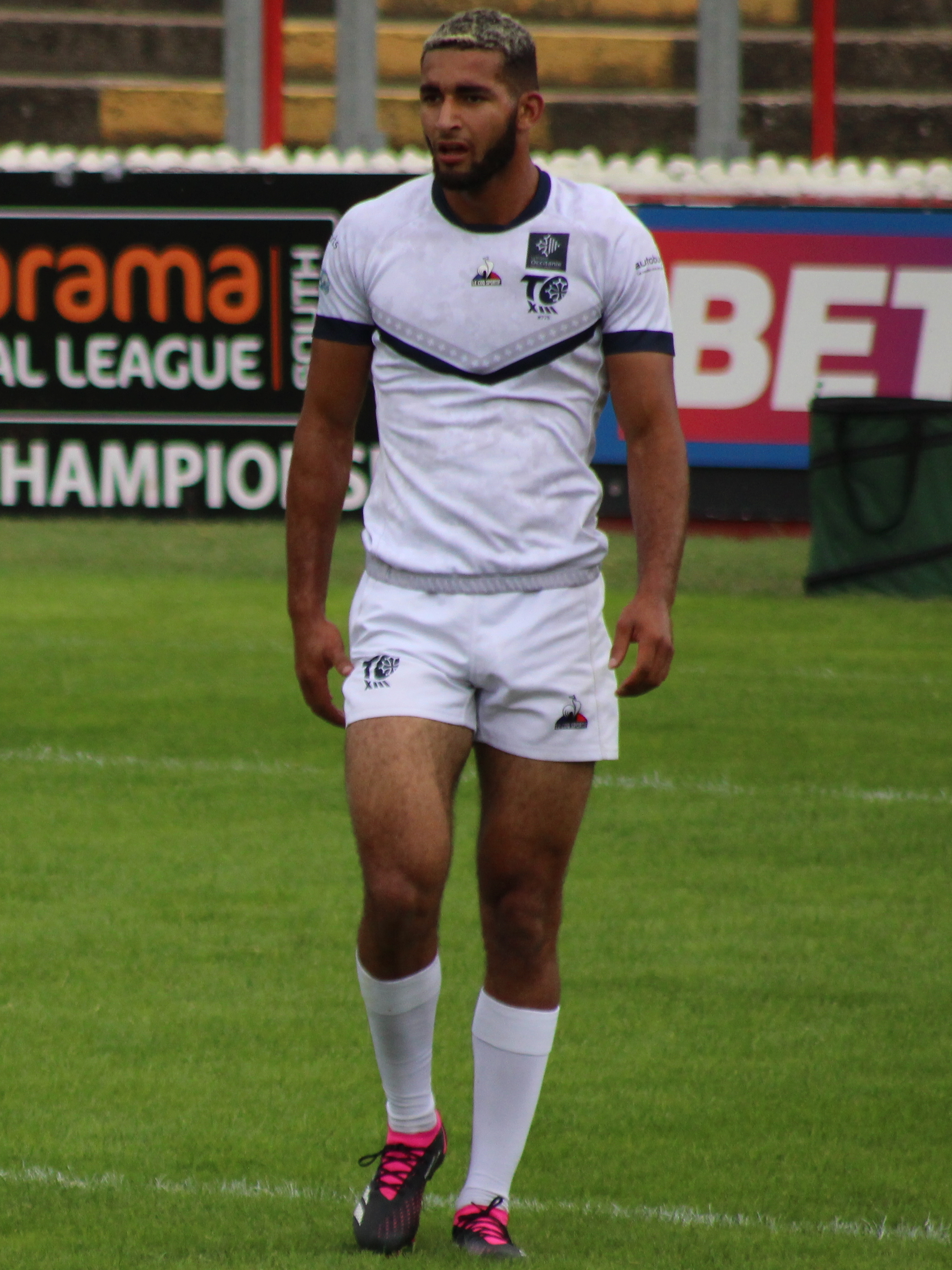

Personal information
- Full name: Benjamin Laguerre
- Born: 13 September 2001 (age 25) Marseille, Provence-Alpes-Côte d'Azur, France
- Height: 6 ft 3 in (1.90 m)
- Weight: 14 st 2 lb (90 kg)

Playing information
- Position: Wing, Fullback
Club
Years	Team	Pld	T	G	FG	P
2021–	Toulouse Olympique	61	41	0	0	144
Representative
Years	Team	Pld	T	G	FG	P
2026–	France	3	0	0	0	0
- Source: As of 1 November 2026
- Relatives: Matthieu Laguerre (brother)

Benjamin Laguerre (born 13 September 2001) is a French professional rugby league footballer who plays as a winger for Toulouse Olympique in the Super League.

== Background ==
Laguerre was born in Marseille, Provence-Alpes-Côte d'Azur, France.

He played rugby union at school, before taking up rugby league with Marseille XIII Avenir and later joined the youth sections of RC Salon XIII.

Laguerre is the younger brother of fellow French professional rugby league footballer Matthieu Laguerre, who plays for Catalans Dragons.

== Career ==
Laguerre joined the Toulouse Olympique Academy in 2019. Following the COVID-19 lockdown he made appearances for the Toulouse Olympique Broncos side in the Elite One Championship and joined the first team squad for training.

In April 2021 he made his professional début for Toulouse in the RFL Championship against the Halifax Panthers.

Laguerre made his Super League début for TO in September 2022 against St Helens.

=== International ===
He was named in the France squad for the 2026 Rugby League World Cup qualifier with Jamaica in Autumn 2025, but did not play.

On 1 October 2026 he was named in the 2026 France World Cup squad

He made his France international début in the 2026 Rugby League World Cup 78-4 defeat to Samoa on 16 October 2026.
