= Chris Chester (rugby league) =

Professional rugby league coach & former professional rugby league footballer

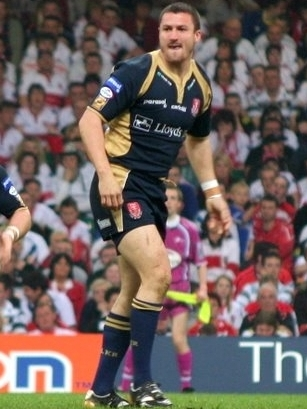

Personal information
- Full name: Christopher Chester
- Born: 8 October 1978 (age 47) Wakefield, West Yorkshire, England
- Height: 6 ft 2 in (1.88 m)
- Weight: 13 st 6 lb (85 kg)

Playing information
- Position: Loose forward, Second-row, Stand-off
Club
Years	Team	Pld	T	G	FG	P
1996–99	Halifax RLFC	73	16	15	1	95
1999–01	Wigan Warriors	43	5	0	0	20
2002–06	Hull FC	103	14	0	0	56
2007–08	Hull Kingston Rovers	36	5	0	0	20
	Total	255	40	15	1	191

Coaching information
Club
Years	Team	Gms	W	D	L	W%
2014–16	Hull Kingston Rovers	31	16	0	15	52
2016–21	Wakefield Trinity	161	64	1	96	40
2025	Castleford Tigers (interim)	10	2	0	8	20
2026	Castleford Tigers (interim)	5	1	0	4	20
	Total	207	83	1	123	40
Representative
Years	Team	Gms	W	D	L	W%
2018	Scotland	4	0	0	4	0
- Source: As of 12 September 2026

Chris Chester (born 8 October 1978) is an English rugby league coach and former professional rugby league footballer who is the director of rugby for Castleford Tigers in the Super League.

As a player, Chester played as a forward for Halifax, Wigan Warriors, Hull FC (with whom he won the 2005 Challenge Cup) and Hull Kingston Rovers in the Super League.

He was the head coach of Hull Kingston Rovers in the Super League from 2014, however his resignation was announced in February/March 2016. He was appointed head coach of Wakefield Trinity in the Super League and Scotland at international level. On 10 August 2021, A statement from Wakefield said that they had parted ways with head coach Chris Chester, with Willie Poching talking over as interim coach. He was director of rugby at Leigh Leopards for four years.

== Background ==
Chester was born in Wakefield, West Yorkshire, England. He attended Kettlethorpe High School whose P.E. teacher at the time was the former Leeds Rugby Union winger and ex-England Head Coach, Stuart Lancaster.

== Playing career ==
The former Stanley Rangers junior was captain of England Schools before he signed as a professional with Halifax. He made an impression in 1998's Super League III, where he was the runner-up for the Young Player of the Year award.

He moved to the Wigan Warriors in 1999 and played from the interchange bench in their 2000 Super League Grand Final defeat by St. Helens. He also played for the Wigan Warriors from the interchange bench in their 2001 Super League Grand Final defeat by the Bradford Bulls.

Chester then moved to Hull FC, and played in the 2005 Challenge Cup Final from the interchange bench in the victory over the Leeds Rhinos. After spending seven years at Hull FC, Chester joined Hull Kingston Rovers for their inaugural season in Super League and played for the club for two seasons.

== Coaching career ==
=== Hull Kingston Rovers ===
Chester retired from playing following a serious neck injury and took up a role as first team coach of Hull KR. He had previously been on the coaching staff at Castleford Tigers. In 2014, Chester was promoted to head coach following the departure of Craig Sandercock. In his first full season as head coach, Chester guided Hull KR to the 2015 Challenge Cup final, but his team were soundly beaten. On 24 February 2016, Hull Kingston Rovers dismissed Chester as head coach following the home defeat by Wakefield Trinity Wildcats on 21 February 2016; they had gained one point from their opening three matches in the 2016 Super League season.

=== Wakefield Trinity ===
On 16 March 2016, Chester was appointed Head Coach at Wakefield Trinity with immediate effect following the departure of Brian Smith.

Chester guided Wakefield to 8th position in the table in 2016 and 5th the following season. In 2016, Chester also led Wakefield to a Challenge Cup semi-final.

On 10 August 2021, Chester was terminated as head coach of Wakefield after recording only four wins in the 2021 Super League season and with the club sitting second last on the table.

=== Castleford Tigers ===
On 7 July 2025, he took over as interim head-coach at Castleford Tigers, following the departure of Danny McGuire.

On 7 August 2026 he temporarily took over the role of head coach in Ryan Carr's absence.
