= Ryan Carr (rugby league) =

Australian rugby league coach (born 1988)

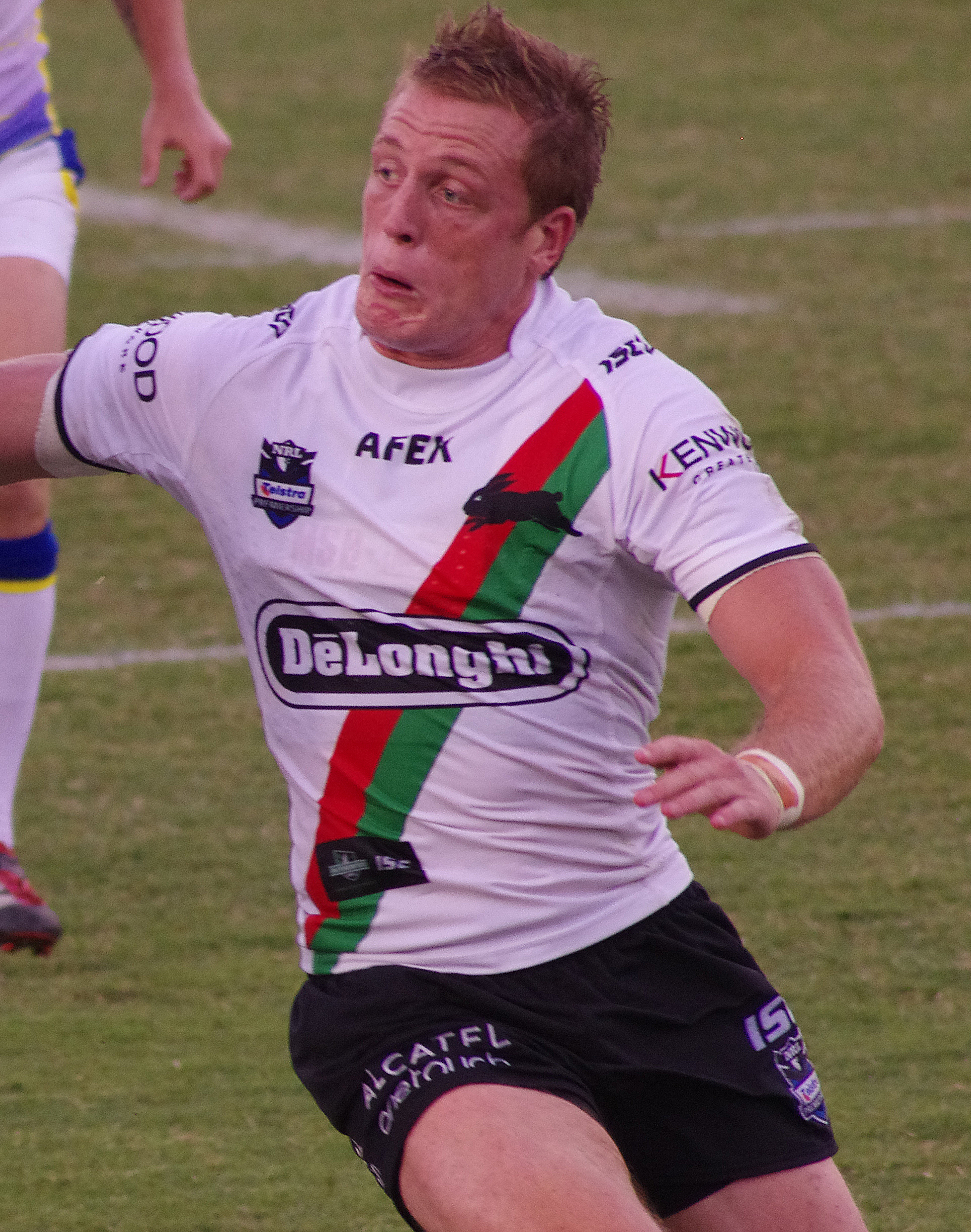

Personal information
- Full name: Ryan Carr
- Born: 3 August 1988 (age 38) Sydney, New South Wales, Australia
- Height: 5 ft 10 in (1.79 m)
- Weight: 13 st 8 lb (86 kg)
- Position: Hooker, Stand-off

Coaching information
Club
Years	Team	Gms	W	D	L	W%
2019	Featherstone Rovers	35	23	0	12	66
2023	St. George Illawarra	14	3	0	11	21
2026	Castleford Tigers	23	8	0	15	35
	Total	72	34	0	38	47
- Source: As of 16 November 2026

Ryan Carr (born 3 August 1988) is an Australian rugby league coach.

He is the former head coach of Featherstone Rovers in the RFL Championship, and interim head coach of St. George Illawarra Dragons in the National Rugby League.

== Background ==
Carr was born in Sydney and played his junior rugby league for the Engadine Dragons. He attended Endeavour Sports High School before being signed by the Cronulla-Sutherland Sharks. In 2006, he won the NRL Schoolboy Cup championship with Endeavour.

== Playing career ==
In 2005, Carr represented the New South Wales under-17 team. In 2006 and 2007, Carr played for the Sharks in the Jersey Flegg Cup.

In 2008, Carr signed with the North Queensland Cowboys for the inaugural season of the Toyota Cup. He played 24 games for the club and captained the side. In 2009 and 2010, Carr played for the Balmain Tigers in the New South Wales Cup, before joining the Redcliffe Dolphins in the Queensland Cup in 2011.

In 2012, Carr signed with the South Sydney Rabbitohs. After one season at South Sydney, Carr played two seasons with Mounties and the Illawarra Cutters in the NSW Cup before retiring.

== Coaching career ==
In 2017, after assistant roles with the Rabbitohs and Sharks, Carr was appointed as head coach of the Rabbitohs Under-20s team.

=== Mount Pritchard Mounties ===
In 2018, Carr was appointed as head coach of Mounties, who were a Canberra Raiders feeder club at the time. In his first season, Carr guided Mounties to the top 8, being knocked out in week two by Newtown.

=== Featherstone Rovers ===
In 2019, Carr was hired to coach Featherstone Rovers in the Championship in England. Carr had a successful season with Featherstone, guiding them 5th place and making the semi finals. Featherstone won three straight semi finals in a row, guiding them to a final promotion play-off with the Toronto Wolfpack, ultimately losing.

In 2020, Carr returned to Australia, joining the Parramatta Eels as their NSW Cup head coach. Halfway through the 2022 season, after the departure of David Kidwell to the Argentina rugby union team, Carr was elevated to assistant NRL coach under Brad Arthur.

=== St George Illawarra Dragons ===
On 11 September 2022, Carr joined the St. George Illawarra Dragons as an assistant to head coach Anthony Griffin. On 16 May 2023, Carr was named as interim coach of the Dragons, following the departure Griffin. In Round 12 of the 2023 NRL season, he won his first game in charge of the club, a 24–22 victory of the Sydney Roosters.

=== Castleford Tigers ===
On 21 August 2025, Carr was appointed head coach of Castleford in the Super League from the 2026 season. On 5 August 2026, Castleford announced Carr would not be in attendance at their round 22 match against Hull KR "due to personal reasons, contrary to the reports on social media". On 21 August 2026, Carr left his role as head coach of Castleford. Owner of Castleford Martin Jepson said he was sorry that Carr had left the club and the search for a new head coach would begin immediately.
