= 2020 St Helens R.F.C. season =

- Super League Rank: 2nd (champions)
- 2020 record: Wins: 14; draws: 0; losses: 6
- Points scored: For: 555; against: 215

Team information
- Chairman: Eamonn McManuss
- Head Coach: Kristian Woolf
- Captain: James Roby
- Stadium: Totally Wicked Stadium; St. Helens, Merseyside
- Avg. attendance: 12,845
- Agg. attendance: 38,534
- High attendance: 16,108
- Low attendance: 10,418

Top scorers
- Tries: Regan Grace (12)
- Goals: Lachlan Coote (70)
- Points: Lachlan Coote (180)
← 2019	List of seasons	2021 →

This article details the St Helens's rugby league football club's 2020 season.

== Fixtures and results ==
Win Draw Loss

- All fixtures are subject to change

=== Betfred World Club Challenge ===
Date and time	Rnd	Versus	H/A	Venue	Result	Score	Tries	Goals	Attendance	TV	Report
22 February, 19:45	—N/a	Sydney Roosters	H	Totally Wicked Stadium	L	12-20	Thompson, Walmsley	Makinson (3)	16,108	Sky Sports	

=== Coral Challenge Cup ===
Date and time	Rnd	Versus	H/A	Venue	Result	Score	Tries	Goals	Attendance	TV	Report
19 September, 14:30	6	Warrington Wolves	N	AJ Bell Stadium	L	18-20	Lomax, Naiqama, Grace	Coote (3)	—N/a	BBC Sport	

=== Regular season ===
Date and time	Rnd	Versus	H/A	Venue	Result	Score	Tries	Goals	Attendance	TV	Report
2 February, 19:45	1	Salford Red Devils	H	Totally Wicked Stadium	W	48–8	Taia, Walmsley (2), Fages, Naiqama (2), Welsby (2)	Coote (3), Percival (5)	12,008	Sky Sports	Report
6 February, 19:45	2	Warrington Wolves	A	Halliwell Jones Stadium	L	0–19	—N/a	—N/a	12,562	Sky Sports	Report
16 February, 15:00	3	Hull FC	A	KCOM Stadium	W	32–18	Costello, Thompson, McCarthy-Scarsbrook, Bentley, Smith	Makinson (6)	12,399	—N/a	
29 February, 18:00	5	Toronto Wolfpack	A	Halliwell Jones Stadium	W	32–0	Lomax (2), Bentley, McCarthy-Scarsbrook, Smith	Makinson (6)	4,123	Sky Sports	
6 March, 19:45	6	Huddersfield Giants	H	Totally Wicked Stadium	L	10–12	Thompson, Knowles	Makinson	10,418	—N/a	
15 March, 15:00	7	Castleford Tigers	A	Mend-A-Hose Jungle	L	14–28	Makinson, Welsby, Thompson	Makinson	7,268	Sky Sports	
2 August, 16:15 (Note: as a result of the COVID-19 outbreak, the RFL announced a suspension of fixtures in the Betfred Super League season indefinitely, during which time, the season’s structure and fixture rescheduling will be considered..)	4	Catalans Dragons	N	Emerald Headingley Stadium	W	34-6	Coote (2), Makinson, Taia, Walmsley, Bentley	Coote (5)	—N/a	Sky Sports	
9 August, 18:30	8	Leeds Rhinos	N	Emerald Headingley Stadium	W	48-0	Grace (3), Graham, Coote, Fages, Walmsley, Makinson	Coote (8)	—N/a	Sky Sports	
16 August, 16:00	9	Castleford Tigers	H	Totally Wicked Stadium	W	10-0	Fages	Coote (3)	—N/a	Sky Sports	
30 August, 13:00	10	Hull KR	N	Halliwell Jones Stadium	W	32-18	Welsby (2), Naiqama, Walmsley, Smith	Coote (6)	—N/a	Sky Sports	
4 September, 18:00	11	Huddersfield Giants	N	Emerald Headingley Stadium	W	54-6	Coote (2), Grace (2), Costello, Walmsley, Peyroux, McCarthy-Scarsbrook, Smith	Coote (9)	—N/a	Sky Sports	
11 September, 18:00	12	Hull KR	H	Totally Wicked Stadium	W	21-20	Grace, Walmsley, Welsby	Coote (4)	—N/a	Sky Sports	
29 September, 19:00	14	Wigan Warriors	N	AJ Bell Stadium	W	42-0	Grace (2), Walmsley, Welsby (2), Bentley, Knowles	Coote (7)	—N/a	Sky Sports	
9 October, 17:30	15	Wakefield Trinity	N	Emerald Headingley Stadium	W	20-16	Coote (2), Grace, McCarthy-Scarsbrook	Coote (2)	—N/a	Sky Sports	
15 October, 19:00	16	Wakefield Trinity	N	Halliwell Jones Stadium	W	48-6	Makinson (3), Roby (2), Grace, Naiqama, Dodd, Walmsley	Coote (6)	—N/a	Sky Sports	
23 October, 19:00	17	Leeds Rhinos	H	Totally Wicked Stadium	W	40-8	Simm (3), Naiqama, Fages, Smith, Taia	Coote (6)	—N/a	Sky Sports	
26 October, 17:00	18	Salford Red Devil’s	N	Emerald Headingley Stadium	L	10–12	Eaves	Dodd (3)	—N/a	Sky Sports	
30 October, 20:15	19	Wigan Warriors	H	Totally Wicked Stadium	L	6–18	Coote	Coote (1)	—N/a	Sky Sports	

=== Play Offs Preliminary Semi Final ===
Date and time	Rnd	Versus	H/A	Venue	Result	Score	Tries	Goals	Attendance	TV	Report
20 November, 19:45	Semi Final	Catalans Dragons	H	Totally Wicked Stadium	W	48-2	Naiqama (3), Coote (2), Lomax, Grace, Bentley	Coote (8)	—N/a	Sky Sports	

=== Betfred Super League Grand Final ===
Date and time	Rnd	Versus	H/A	Venue	Result	Score	Tries	Goals	Attendance	TV	Report
27 November, 20:00	Grand Final	Wigan Warriors	N	KCOM Stadium	W	8-4	Welsby	Coote (2)	—N/a	Sky Sports	

== League standings ==
Pos	Team	Pld	W	D	L	PF	PA	PP	Pts	PCT	Qualification (Note: Where teams have the same win percentage, position is decided by points scored percentage (points scored divided by points conceded).)
1	Wigan Warriors (L)	17	13	0	4	408	278	146.8	26	76.47	Semi-finals
2	St Helens (C)	17	12	0	5	469	195	240.5	24	70.59	Semi-finals
3	Warrington Wolves (Note: Salford forfeited a game against Warrington. Under RFL operational rules, the game is recorded as a 24–0 victory for Warrington and converse loss for Salford with the points scored/conceded applying to both teams.)	17	12	0	5	365	204	178.9	24	70.59	Elimination semi-finals
4	Catalans Dragons	13	8	0	5	376	259	145.2	16	61.54	Elimination semi-finals
5	Leeds Rhinos	17	10	0	7	369	390	94.6	20	58.82	Elimination semi-finals
6	Hull F.C.	17	9	0	8	405	436	92.9	18	52.94	Elimination semi-finals
7	Huddersfield Giants (Note: Huddersfield were placed on standby to take the place of any of the four teams in the elimination finals should one be unable to fulfil their fixture.)	18	7	0	11	318	367	86.6	14	38.89	
8	Castleford Tigers	16	6	0	10	328	379	86.5	12	37.50	
9	Salford Red Devils	18	8	0	10	354	469	75.5	10 (Note: Salford deducted 3 wins by the Rugby Football League for failing to meet the terms of a financial commitment agreed in 2013.)	27.78	
10	Wakefield Trinity	19	5	0	14	324	503	64.4	10	26.32	
11	Hull Kingston Rovers	17	3	0	14	290	526	55.1	6	17.65	

Source: BBC Sport
Rules for classification: 1) Points; 2) Points difference; 3) Number of points scored;
(C) Champions; (L) League Leaders' Shield Winners

== Player statistics ==
#	Player	Position	Tries	Goals	DG	Points	Red Cards	Yellow Cards
1	Lachlan Coote	Fullback	10	70	0	180	0	0
2	Tommy Makinson	Wing	6	8	0	40	0	0
3	Kevin Naiqama	Centre	9	0	0	36	0	1
4	Mark Percival	Centre	0	5	0	10	0	0
5	Regan Grace	Wing	12	0	0	48	0	0
6	Jonny Lomax	Stand-off	2	3	0	14	0	1
7	Theo Fages	Scrum-half	1	0	1	5	0	0
8	Alex Walmsley	Prop	10	0	0	40	0	1
9	James Roby	Hooker	2	0	0	8	0	0
10	Luke Thompson	Prop	4	0	0	16	0	0
11	Zeb Taia	Second-row	3	0	0	12	0	0
12	Dominique Peyroux	Second-row	1	0	0	4	0	0
13	Louie McCarthy-Scarsbrook	Loose forward	3	0	0	12	0	1
14	Morgan Knowles	Loose forward	2	0	0	8	0	0
15	Matty Lees	Prop	0	0	0	0	0	1
16	Kyle Amor	Prop	0	0	0	0	0	0
17	Jack Ashworth	Prop	0	0	0	0	0	0
18	Joseph Paulo	Loose forward	0	0	0	0	0	0
19	Aaron Smith	Hooker	4	0	0	16	0	0
20	James Bentley	Second-row	4	0	0	16	0	0
21	Matty Costello	Centre	2	0	0	8	0	0
22	Jack Welsby	Centre	9	0	0	36	0	0
23	Joe Batchelor	Second-row	0	0	0	0	0	0
24	Josh Eaves	Hooker	1	0	0	4	0	0
25	Callum Hazzard	Loose forward	0	0	0	0	0	0
26	Josh Simm	Centre	3	0	0	12	0	0
27	Lewis Dodd	Scrum-half	1	3	0	10	0	0
28	Nico Rizzelli	Centre	0	0	0	0	0	0
29	Matty Foster	Second-row	0	0	0	0	0	0
30	Tom Nisbet	Fullback	0	0	0	0	0	0
31	Jake Wingfield	Loose forward	0	0	0	0	0	0
32	James Graham	Prop	1	0	0	4	0	0
33	Ben Davies	Centre	0	0	0	0	0	0

- As of 2020 Super League Grand Final (27 November 2020)

== 2020 squad ==
*Announced on 21 November 2019:

2020 St Helens First Team
First team squad			Coaching staff
1 Lachlan Coote – FB, SO; 2 Tom Makinson – WG, FB; 3 Kevin Naiqama – CE, WG, FB; 4 Mark Percival – CE; 5 Regan Grace – WG; 6 Jonny Lomax – FB, SH, SO, WG; 7 Theo Fages – SH, HK; 8 Alex Walmsley – PR; 9 James Roby – HK (c); 10 Luke Thompson – PR, SR; 11 Zeb Taia – SR, LF, CE, PR; 12 Dominique Peyroux – SR, CE; 13 Louie McCarthy-Scarsbrook – LF, SR, PR	14 Morgan Knowles – LF, SR, HK; 15 Matty Lees – PR, SR; 16 Kyle Amor – PR, LF; 17 Jack Ashworth – SR, CE; 18 Joseph Paulo – SR, LF, SO; 19 Aaron Smith – HK; 20 James Bentley – SR, LF, HK; 21 Matty Costello – CE, FB; 22 Jack Welsby – SO, SH; 23 Joe Batchelor – SR; 24 Josh Eaves – HK; 25 Callum Hazzard – LF; 26 Josh Simm – CE	27 Lewis Dodd – HB; 28 Nico Rizzelli – CE; 29 Matty Foster – SR; 30 Tom Nisbet – FB, WG; 31 Jake Wingfield – LF; 32 James Graham – PR	Head coach: Kristian Woolf; Assistant coaches: Richard Marshall; Paul Wellens; Legend: (c) Captain(s); (vc) Vice-captain(s); Updated: 23 June 2020; Source(s): 2020 Squad Numbers

== 2020 transfers ==
Gains

Player	Club	Contract	Date
James Graham	St. George Illawarra Dragons	6 Months	June 2020

Losses

Player	Club	Contract	Date
Adam Swift	Hull F.C.	2 years	May 2019
Liam Cooper	Widnes Vikings	1 year	October 2019
Luke Douglas	Released	N/A	N/A
Ryan Morgan	Released	N/A	N/A
Danny Richardson	Castleford Tigers	3 Years	October 2019
John Hutchings	Oldham Roughyeds	1 year	October 2019
Luke Thompson	Canterbury Bankstown Bulldogs	3 Years	June 2020
