= Josh Hodson =

English rugby league footballer

Personal information
- Full name: Joshua Hodson
- Born: 15 June 2000 (age 25) Newport, Shropshire, England
- Height: 6 ft 2 in (1.88 m)
- Weight: 15 st 6 lb (98 kg)

Playing information
- Position: Centre, Second-row
Club
Years	Team	Pld	T	G	FG	P
2020–21	London Broncos	19	4	0	0	16
2022–23	Batley Bulldogs	55	24	0	0	96
2024–25	Castleford Tigers	8	0	0	0	0
2025(loan)	→ Widnes Vikings	2	0	0	0	0
2025(loan)	→ Sheffield Eagles	7	0	10	0	20
2026–	Sheffield Eagles	0	0	0	0	0
	Total	91	28	10	0	132
- Source: As of 15 October 2025

Josh Hodson (born 15 June 2000) is an English professional rugby league footballer who plays as a centre or second-row for the Sheffield Eagles in the RFL Championship.

He has previously played for Castleford Tigers in the Super League, and for London Broncos and Batley Bulldogs in the Championship. He has spent time on loan at Widnes Vikings in the Championship.

== Background ==
Hodson was born in Newport, Shropshire, England.

From the age of 6, Hodson played rugby union with Newport RUFC, where he played as a scrum-half. In 2010, he began to play junior rugby league for Telford Raiders, switching position to centre. In 2014, he joined the Midlands Hurricanes academy based out of Loughborough College. Following a successful trial, he signed for the London Broncos academy, where he climbed through the ranks.

== Playing career ==
=== London Broncos ===
On 23 February 2020, Hodson made his senior debut for the London Broncos against the York City Knights in the Challenge Cup, starting on the wing. The following week, he made his first appearance in the Championship against Featherstone Rovers. The league's COVID-19 abandonment prevented any further appearances in Hodson's debut season, but in October he signed a first-team professional contract with London.

Hodson began the 2021 season as a starter for London. On 20 June, he scored his first try for the Broncos against Whitehaven. He finished the year having made 17 appearances and scored 4 tries.

=== Batley Bulldogs ===
In October 2021, the Batley Bulldogs announced the signing of Hodson for 2022, following the arrival of London teammate James Meadows. Head coach Craig Lingard said, "He has got a really bright future in the game and, hopefully, we can help him get to the next level." Hodson made his first Batley appearance against Halifax Panthers on 30 January, and scored his first try for the club against the Royal Navy in the Challenge Cup. He featured in Batley's Championship play-off final defeat against the Leigh Centurions. He made a total 26 appearances and scored 5 tries in the 2022 season.

In the early rounds of the 2023 Challenge Cup, Hodson scored 4 tries on two occasions, against Wath Brow Hornets and Hunslet ARLFC. His try-scoring form attracted the attention of six Super League clubs. Hodson featured in Batley's 1895 Cup final defeat against the Halifax Panthers at Wembley. He finished the season with 19 tries, scored in 29 appearances.

=== Castleford Tigers ===
On 2 October 2023, it was announced that Hodson would join the Castleford Tigers in the Super League on a two-year deal. This move saw him link up with former coach Craig Lingard, who had taken on the role of head coach at the Tigers. Hodson said, "I'm not going to be holding back and I'll give it everything I've got to take the opportunity with both hands," with Castleford claiming to have beaten two Super League rivals to his signature.

After missing the opening rounds with a foot injury, Hodson made his Castleford debut on 23 March 2024 against his former club Batley in the Challenge Cup. He made his full Super League debut the following week at Wheldon Road against the Leeds Rhinos. In a month-long spell starting as a centre, he made five appearances before being supplanted by the signing of Corey Hall. In July, Hodson suffered an ankle injury which prevented him filling in for the also-injured Sam Wood. He was required to undergo surgery and was ruled out for the remainder of the season.

Hodson began the 2025 season filling in at second-row in the absences of Alex Mellor and Jeremiah Simbiken. New Castleford head coach Danny McGuire said of his performances, "It's not a position he's massively familiar with but I do see a future for him there, he has done a good job there."

==== Widnes Vikings (loan) ====
On 25 April 2025, it was announced that he had signed for Widnes Vikings in the RFL Championship on a two-week loan deal.

==== Sheffield Eagles (loan) ====
On 11 June 2025, it was announced that he had signed for Sheffield Eagles in the RFL Championship on loan.

=== Sheffield Eagles ===
On 15 October 2025 it was announced he had made his temporary loan signing permanent with Sheffield Eagles on a 2-year deal.
