= Zac Cini =

Australian rugby league footballer

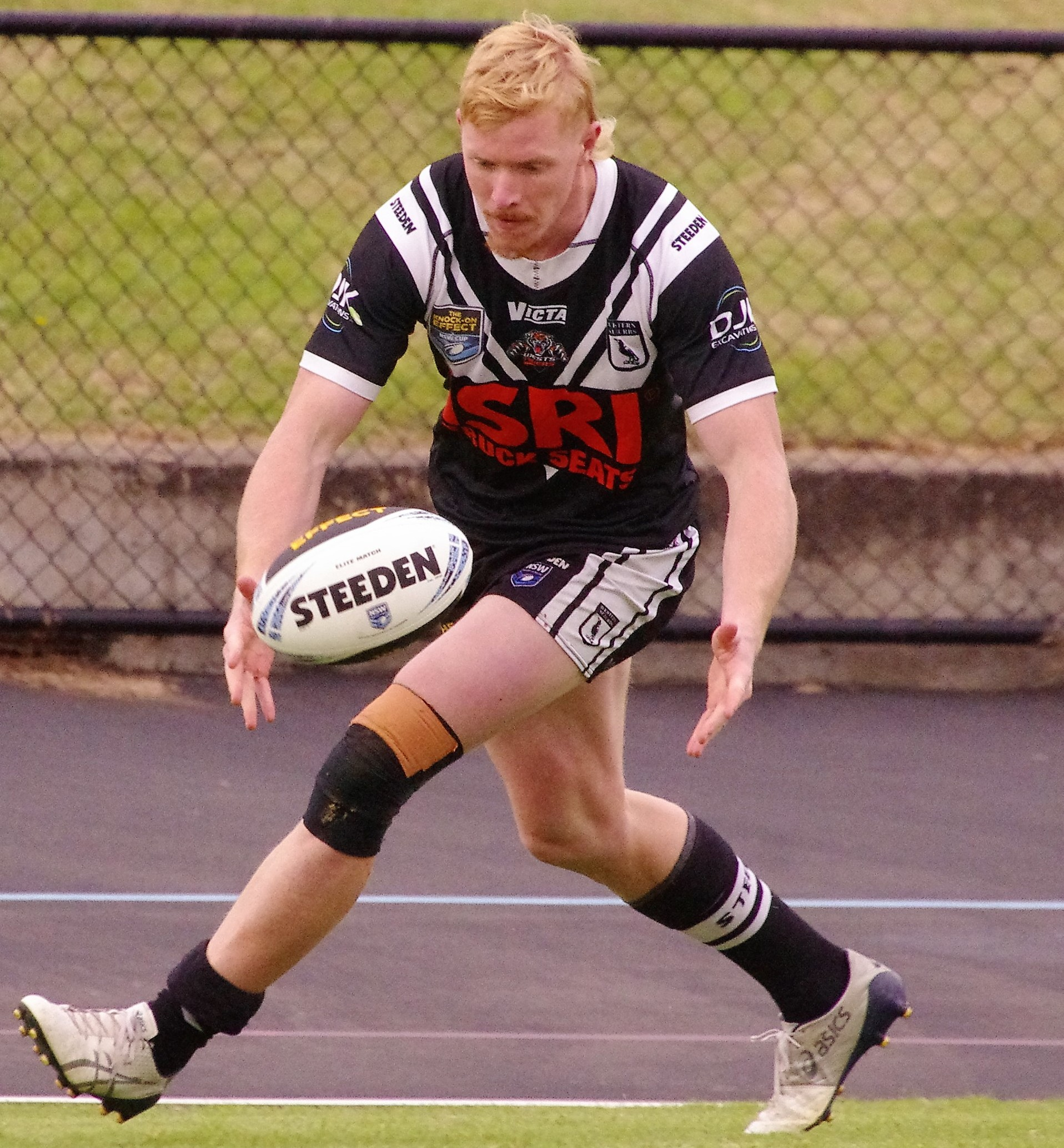

Personal information
- Full name: Zachary Cini
- Born: 24 May 2000 (age 26) Sydney, New South Wales, Australia
- Height: 6 ft 2 in (1.89 m)
- Weight: 14 st 5 lb (91 kg)

Playing information
- Position: Centre, Fullback
Club
| Years | Team | Pld | T | G | FG | P |
|---|---|---|---|---|---|---|
| 2021 | Wests Tigers | 4 | 1 | 0 | 0 | 4 |
| 2025–26 | Castleford Tigers | 34 | 6 | 0 | 0 | 24 |
| | Total | 38 | 7 | 0 | 0 | 28 |
- Source: As of 20 June 2026

Zachary Cini (born 24 May 2000) is an Australian professional rugby league footballer who most recently played as a centre or fullback for the Castleford Tigers in the Super League.

He has previously played for Wests Tigers in the National Rugby League.

== Background ==
Cini was born in Sydney and is of Maltese descent.

Cini played his junior rugby league for the Minchinbury Jets. He later said, "I grew up supporting the Tigers. I loved Benji in 2005 and I used to sit in the lounge room watching him on TV. When he played the grand final I was five and I used to go out into the yard and try to practise the Benji step."

== Playing career ==
=== Early career ===
Cini came through the Penrith Panthers junior system playing in their SG Ball championship winning team of 2018, he was educated at St Dominic's College, Penrith where he made the Australian Schoolboys rugby league team in that same year.

=== 2021 ===
Cini was named to his debut in round 8 for the Tigers, starting on the wing against the St. George Illawarra Dragons away at WIN Stadium. At the time he was leading the lower NSW Cup competition in post-contact metres, tackle breaks, runs and run metres. He scored a try and had another disallowed as he "starred" in his first game. He said after the match, "I got about 20 tickets for family and my mates organised a bus. I think there was about 50 of them that jumped on the bus and sat in that corner. You could definitely hear them. It is a dream just to play footy but to score on debut with my mates in that corner, just the support they gave was awesome and made it 10 times better." The Sydney Morning Herald said, "The flying mullet man from Minchinbury, a mad Wests Tigers fan, became an instant cult hero."

Cini played a total of four matches for the Wests Tigers in the 2021 NRL season as the club finished 13th and missed the finals. In December 2021, Cini was released by the Wests Tigers and he joined NSW Cup side Newtown.

=== 2022 ===
Before the start of the 2022 NSW Cup season, Cini departed Newtown and signed a contract to join Parramatta's NSW Cup team.

=== 2023 ===
Cini made no appearances for Parramatta's first grade team in 2023. He would instead play for the clubs NSW Cup side making 20 appearances and scoring eleven tries.

=== 2024 ===
On 21 August, it was announced that Cini would join Castleford Tigers in the Super League on a two-year deal from 2025.

Cini made no first-grade appearances for Parramatta in 2024, instead featuring for the club's NSW Cup team.

=== 2025 ===
Cini was assigned squad number 3 for Castleford and made his debut on 9 February against Bradford in the Challenge Cup. In round 1 of the Super League campaign, Cini scored a late try to take the game to golden point extra-time in the Tigers' 19–18 defeat against Hull Kingston Rovers.

Having began the season playing as left centre, Cini moved onto the right edge from round 4 in a swap with Sam Wood. He scored one try against Leeds in round 3, Leigh in round 7, and Salford in round 11. Following a standout performance filling in at fullback in round 14, head coach Danny McGuire singled Cini out for praise, stating that he had "been really good for us all year."

Cini was sidelined for six weeks by a facial fracture suffered against St Helens in August. He made 22 appearances throughout the 2025 season as the club finished 11th on the table. In September, Cini reportedly attracted transfer interest from Catalans Dragons, although ultimately remained at Castleford.

=== 2026 ===
Cini was ruled out of the opening rounds of the 2026 season by a hamstring injury sustained during pre-season training. Following his return to the side in round 3, Cini deputised at fullback for six matches due to injuries to Blake Taaffe and Fletcher Rooney. With Castleford in the market for an out-and-out fullback replacement and with Cini not selected for two matches, it was speculated that he could transfer to Bradford in April. However, from round 10 he returned to the team in his primary position of right centre following the signing of Phoenix Laulu-Togaga'e. He scored his first try of the season against Toulouse Olympique in round 15, rising highest to claim a cross-field kick.

On 5 July, it was confirmed that Cini had left Castleford Tigers with immediate effect. Head coach Ryan Carr confirmed his exit was by mutual consent and for personal reasons, saying "He was a great player for us and we appreciate everything he's done during his time at the club," but that his departure "was the best thing for him and his family at that time."

== Statistics ==
Appearances and points in all competitions by year
| Club | Season | Tier | App | T | G | DG | Pts |
|---|---|---|---|---|---|---|---|
| Wests Tigers | 2021 | NRL | 4 | 1 | 0 | 0 | 4 |
| → Wests Magpies (R) | 2021 | NSW Cup | 11 | 1 | 0 | 0 | 4 |
| Parramatta Eels (R) | 2022 | NSW Cup | 22 | 9 | 0 | 0 | 36 |
| Parramatta Eels (R) | 2023 | NSW Cup | 20 | 11 | 0 | 0 | 44 |
| Parramatta Eels (R) | 2024 | NSW Cup | 21 | 10 | 0 | 0 | 40 |
| Parramatta Eels (R) | Total | | 63 | 30 | 0 | 0 | 120 |
| Castleford Tigers | 2025 | Super League | 22 | 5 | 0 | 0 | 20 |
| Castleford Tigers | 2026 | Super League | 12 | 1 | 0 | 0 | 4 |
| Castleford Tigers | Total | | 34 | 6 | 0 | 0 | 24 |
| Career total | | | 112 | 38 | 0 | 0 | 152 |

As of match played 20 June 2026
