= 2025 Castleford Tigers season =

English rugby league season

Castleford Tigers 2025 season
- Super League rank: 11th
- Play-off result: Did not qualify
- Challenge Cup: Third round
- 2025 record: Wins: 6; draws: 0; losses: 22
- Points scored: For: 412; against: 833

Team information
- Chairman: Martin Jepson
- Head coach: Danny McGuire (sacked 7 July); Chris Chester (interim)
- Captain: Sam Wood Alex Mellor
- Stadium: Wheldon Road
- Avg. attendance: 6,844
- Agg. attendance: 88,974
- High attendance: 8,069
- Low attendance: 5,469

Top scorers
- Tries: Josh Simm (8)
- Goals: Rowan Milnes (25)
- Points: Tex Hoy (64)
← 2024	List of seasons	2026 →

The 2025 season was the Castleford Tigers' 100th season in the Rugby Football League and their 18th consecutive season in the top flight of English rugby league. The club competed in the 2025 Super League and the 2025 Challenge Cup.

Castleford began the season under new head coach Danny McGuire before he was dismissed in July, with director of rugby Chris Chester taking charge as caretaker. The team was captained initially by Sam Wood, then by Alex Mellor from May. They finished the Super League season in 11th place.

== Kits ==
Supplier: Oxen
Main sponsor: CBR Engineering

Home	Away	Third (Note: In tribute to the Papua New Guinean players who have represented the club.)

== First-team squad ==
2025 Castleford Tigers Squad
First team squad				Coaching staff
(Australia) 1 Tex Hoy – FB; (Fiji) 2 Jason Qareqare – WG; (Australia) 3 Zac Cini – CE; (England) 4 Sam Wood (c) – CE; (Ireland) 5 Innes Senior – WG; (Samoa) 6 Daejarn Asi – SH, SO; (England) 7 Rowan Milnes (gk) – SO, SH; (England) 8 Liam Watts – PR; (Papua New Guinea) 9 Liam Horne – HK, LF; (England) 10 George Lawler (vc) – PR, SR, HK; (Papua New Guinea) 11 Jeremiah Simbiken – SR; (England) 12 Alex Mellor (vc) – SR, CE; (England) 13 Joe Westerman – LF, PR	(Papua New Guinea) 14 Judah Rimbu – HK, SO; (England) 15 George Griffin – PR; (England) 16 Cain Robb – HK; (England) 17 Luke Hooley – FB; (England) 18 Josh Hodson – CE; (England) 19 Sam Hall – PR; (Nigeria) 20 Muizz Mustapha – PR; (Papua New Guinea) 21 Sylvester Namo – PR; (Ireland) 22 Louis Senior – WG; (England) 23 Fletcher Rooney – FB; (England) 24 Josh Simm – WG, CE; (England) 25 Will Tate – CE, WG; (England) 26 George Hill – LF, HK	(England) 27 Jenson Windley – SH, SO; (Estonia) 28 Akim Matvejev – PR; (England) 29 Alfie Horwell – HK, SO; (England) 30 Daniel Sarbah – WG, CE; (England) 31 Kieran Hudson – PR; (England) 32 Woody Walker – PR, LF; (England) 33 Sam Darley – SR; (England) 34 Jacob Hall – WG; (Nigeria) 35 Daniel Okoro – PR; (England) 36 Ben Davies – CE, SR; (England) 37 Lee Kershaw – WG; (Ireland) 38 Brad Singleton – PR; (France) 39 Hugo Salabio – PR	(France) 40 Jordan Dezaria – PR; (Australia) 41 Tom Amone – PR; (England) 42 Chris Atkin – SO, HK; (Australia) 43 Joe Stimson – SR, PR; (England) 44 Andy Djeukessi – WG; (Nigeria) 45 Elliot Wallis – WG; (England) 46 Alfie Lindsey – WG; (Brazil) Ramon Silva – PR; (England) Nick Staveley – PR, SR	Head coach: (England) Danny McGuire (sacked 7 July); (England) Chris Chester (interim); Assistant coaches: (Australia) Brett Delaney; (England) Scott Murrell; Legend: (c) Captain(s); (vc) Vice-captain(s); (gk) Goal kicker

== Transfers and loans ==
=== Transfers in ===
No	Player	From	Contract	Date	Ref.
5	(Ireland) Innes Senior	Huddersfield Giants	2 years (Note: Initially joined on loan during the 2024 season, with the deal being made permanent ahead of 2025)	22 May 2024	
22	(Ireland) Louis Senior	Hull Kingston Rovers	2 years	22 May 2024	
3	(Australia) Zac Cini	Parramatta Eels	2 years	21 August 2024	
6	(Samoa) Daejarn Asi	Parramatta Eels	2 years	30 October 2024	
14	(Papua New Guinea) Judah Rimbu	PNG Hunters	2 years	1 November 2024	
31	(England) Kieran Hudson	Leeds Rhinos	1 year	20 November 2024	
11	(Papua New Guinea) Jeremiah Simbiken	Dolphins	1 year	4 December 2024	
—	(England) Nick Staveley	Hull FC	Trial (Note: Staveley departed the club on 17 March at the conclusion of the trial period)	11 February 2025	
—	(Brazil) Ramon Silva	Barrow Raiders	1½ years	18 March 2025	
38	(Ireland) Brad Singleton	Salford Red Devils	1½ years	19 March 2025	
41	(Australia) Tom Amone	Canterbury Bulldogs	½ year	15 April 2025	
42	(England) Chris Atkin	Salford Red Devils	1½ years	29 April 2025	
43	(Australia) Joe Stimson	Brisbane Tigers	1½ years	23 June 2025	

=== Loans in ===
No	Player	From	Loan type	Arrival	Return	Ref.
35	(Nigeria) Daniel Okoro	Warrington Wolves	Season-long	19 December 2024	24 July 2025	
36	(England) Ben Davies	St Helens	Two-week	11 February 2025	19 February 2025	
37	(England) Lee Kershaw	Hull Kingston Rovers	Two-week	19 February 2025	5 March 2025	
37	(England) Lee Kershaw	Hull Kingston Rovers	Two-week	7 April 2025	21 April 2025	
40	(France) Jordan Dezaria	Catalans Dragons	One-month	15 April 2025	6 May 2025	
39	(France) Hugo Salabio	Hull FC	Season-long, two-week recall	15 April 2025	9 September 2025	
45	(Nigeria) Elliot Wallis	Huddersfield Giants	Season-long	13 August 2025	20 September 2025	

=== Transfers out ===
No	Player	To	Contract	Date	Ref.
3	(England) Jack Broadbent	Hull Kingston Rovers	3 years	23 April 2024	
6	(England) Danny Richardson	Hull Kingston Rovers	2 years	23 August 2024	
9	(England) Paul McShane	York Knights (Note: McShane initially announced his retirement, but later joined the York Knights on a two-year deal)	2 years	5 September 2024	
7	(Australia) Jacob Miller	Retired (Note: Miller joined Australian amateur club Mullumbimby Giants after departing Castleford)		7 October 2024	
11	(Lebanon) Elie El-Zakhem	Mackay Cutters	1 year	7 October 2024	
17	(Papua New Guinea) Nixon Putt	Central Queensland Capras	1 year	7 October 2024	
25	(England) Brad Martin	Leigh Leopards	2 years	7 October 2024	
26	(Democratic Republic of the Congo) Samy Kibula	Batley Bulldogs	1 year	7 October 2024	
30	(Jamaica) Luis Johnson	Doncaster	½ year (Note: Johnson joined Doncaster in July 2025 after completing his rehabilitation from an ACL injury with Castleford)	7 October 2024	
32	(England) Dan Hindmarsh	Released		7 October 2024	
31	(England) Kieran Hudson	York Knights	1 year	18 December 2024	
8	(England) Liam Watts	Hull FC	½ year	27 February 2025	
21	(Papua New Guinea) Sylvester Namo	Brisbane Tigers	½ year	23 April 2025	
14	(Papua New Guinea) Judah Rimbu	PNG Hunters	½ year	14 June 2025	
7	(England) Rowan Milnes	Hull Kingston Rovers	½ year	22 August 2025	

=== Loans out ===
No	Player	To	Loan type	Departure	Return	Ref.
17	(England) Luke Hooley	Bradford Bulls	Two-week, rolling	12 March 2025	Permanent (Note: The deal was made permanent on 23 September 2025)	
17	(England) Luke Hooley	Bradford Bulls	Season-long	10 May 2025	Permanent	
26	(England) George Hill	Salford Red Devils	One-month	25 March 2025	21 May 2025	
26	(England) George Hill	Salford Red Devils	Two-week, rolling	29 April 2025	21 May 2025	
18	(England) Josh Hodson	Widnes Vikings	Two-week	25 April 2025	9 May 2025	
—	(Brazil) Ramon Silva	Barrow Raiders	Two-week, rolling	21 May 2025	4 June 2025	
27	(England) Jenson Windley	Sheffield Eagles	One-month	29 May 2025	30 July 2025	
27	(England) Jenson Windley	Sheffield Eagles	Season-long	30 June 2025	30 July 2025	
18	(England) Josh Hodson	Sheffield Eagles	Two-week, rolling	11 June 2025	7 August 2025	
44	(England) Andy Djeukessi	Workington Town	Two-week, rolling	12 June 2025	30 July 2025	
—	(Wales) Sam Grice	Workington Town	Two-week, rolling	12 June 2025	26 June 2025	
16	(England) Cain Robb	Salford Red Devils	Two-week, rolling	20 June 2025	11 July 2025	
28	(Estonia) Akim Matvejev	Workington Town	Two-week, rolling	4 July 2025	18 July 2025	
30	(England) Daniel Sarbah	Newcastle Thunder	Two-week	25 July 2025	8 August 2025	
32	(England) Woody Walker	Newcastle Thunder	Two-week	25 July 2025	8 September 2025	
32	(England) Woody Walker	Newcastle Thunder	Season-long	7 August 2025	8 September 2025	
7	(England) Rowan Milnes	Hull Kingston Rovers	Two-week, rolling	6 August 2025	Permanent (Note: The deal was made permanent on 22 August 2025)	
28	(Estonia) Akim Matvejev	Rochdale Hornets	Season-long	7 August 2025	8 September 2025	
29	(England) Alfie Horwell	Newcastle Thunder	Season-long	7 August 2025	8 September 2025	
44	(England) Andy Djeukessi	Workington Town	Season-long	7 August 2025	20 August 2025	

== Pre-season friendlies ==
Castleford announced pre-season fixtures against Sheffield Eagles, Wakefield Trinity and Hull FC, with each serving as a testimonial match for Quentin Laulu-Togaga'e, Luke Gale and Joe Westerman respectively. In January, the squad headed for a week-long training camp in Spain, which included a reduced-contact exhibition match against local club Valencia Huracanes in Tavernes de la Valldigna on 18 January. Played across four 20-minute quarters, the game saw some Castleford players swapping sides to supplement the Valencia team, while one travelling fan won the opportunity to play for the Tigers. Castleford won the match 50–8.

Fri 10 January (Note: Quentin Laulu-Togaga'e's testimonial match)	Sheffield Eagles	P–P (Note: Postponed due to a frozen pitch)	Castleford Tigers	Featherstone
19:30 GMT		TRL Report		Stadium: Post Office Road

Fri 24 January (Note: Luke Gale's testimonial match)	Wakefield Trinity	32–8	Castleford Tigers	Wakefield
20:00 GMT	Tries: Walmsley 4'; Scott 10'; Rourke 36'; Nikotemo 39'; Rodwell 70'; Hamlin-Uele 76'; Goals: Jowitt (2/4) 12', 40'; Gale (1/1) 71'; Rourke (1/1) 78'	TRL Report	Tries: I. Senior 18'; Simm 57'; Goals: Hoy (0/1); Asi (0/1)	Stadium: Belle Vue; Attendance: 3,079; Referee: Liam Rush

Sat 1 February (Note: Joe Westerman's testimonial match)	Castleford Tigers	10–16	Hull FC	Castleford
15:00 GMT	Tries: Simm 13'; I. Senior 28'; Goals: Hoy (1/2) 14'	HDM Report	Tries: Rapana 22'; Cartwright 42'; Bourouh 47'; Goals: Hardaker (0/1); Westerman (2/2) 43', 48'	Stadium: Wheldon Road; Referee: Scott Mikalauskas

== Super League ==
On 20 November 2024, Super League teams revealed their schedules for the opening two matches as well as Rivals Round. On 21 November, the full Super League fixture list was announced. As determined by 2024 league positions, Castleford's five loop fixtures were against Salford and Leeds at home, Hull KR and St Helens away, and Wakefield at the Magic Weekend.

=== Results ===
Round 1: Fri 14 February	Hull Kingston Rovers	19–18	Castleford Tigers	Kingston upon Hull
20:00 GMT	Tries: Burgess 15', 64', 71'; Hiku 38'; Goals: Martin (1/4) 65'; Drop goals: Lewis 84'	BBC Report; Sky Report	Tries: Simm 22'; Rooney 29'; Cini 73'; Goals: Hoy (3/5) 30', 33 (p)', 74'	Stadium: Craven Park; Attendance: 11,020; Referee: Liam Rush

Round 2: Sat 22 February	Castleford Tigers	6–46	St Helens	Castleford
20:00 GMT	Tries: Namo 28'; Goals: Hoy (1/1) 29'	BBC Report; Sky Report	Tries: Batchelor 6'; Feldt 10'; Lomax 14'; Paasi 48'; Robertson 51', 66'; Walmsley 58'; Welsby 75'; Bennison 80'; Goals: Percival (5/9) 8', 49', 53', 59', 77'	Stadium: Wheldon Road; Attendance: 7,723; Referee: Tom Grant

Round 3: Sun 2 March	Leeds Rhinos	38–24	Castleford Tigers	Leeds
15:00 GMT	Tries: Connor 22'; Palasia 26'; Newman 37'; Sinfield 42'; Handley 49'; Hall 57'; Lumb 65'; Goals: Connor (5/7) 23', 27', 38', 43', 59'	BBC Report; Sky Report	Tries: Rooney 52'; Cini 71'; Simbiken 76'; I. Senior 78'; Goals: Hoy (4/4) 54', 72', 77', 79'	Stadium: Headingley Stadium; Attendance: 14,234; Referee: Marcus Griffiths

Round 4: Fri 7 March	Castleford Tigers	22–14	Salford Red Devils	Castleford
20:00 GMT	Tries: Horne 21'; Mustapha 44'; Rimbu 76'; Goals: Hoy (5/6) 23', 46', 49 (p)', 77', 80 (p)'	BBC Report; Sky Report	Tries: Brierley 36'; Watkins 53'; Goals: Sneyd (3/4) 38', 54', 73 (p)' Sin bin: Watkins (yellow card) 20' to 30'	Stadium: Wheldon Road; Attendance: 6,295; Referee: Chris Kendall

Round 5: Sat 22 March	Castleford Tigers	4–26	Catalans Dragons	Castleford
15:00 GMT	Tries: I. Senior 69'; Goals: Milnes (0/1)	BBC Report; Sky Report	Tries: Pangai Junior 18'; Da Costa 22'; Yaha 47'; Tomkins 60'; Goals: Tomkins (5/6) 23', 35 (p)', 40 (p)', 48', 61'; Sin bin: Tomkins (yellow card) 80' to 80'	Stadium: Wheldon Road; Attendance: 6,005; Referee: Liam Rush

Round 6: Thu 27 March	Castleford Tigers	14–24	Hull FC	Castleford
20:00 GMT	Tries: Milnes 20'; Hoy 72'; Simm 78'; Goals: Milnes (1/1) 21'; Hoy (0/2); Sin bin: I. Senior (yellow card) 44' to 54'	BBC Report; Sky Report	Tries: Ese'ese 10'; Sezer 28'; Briscoe 36'; Martin 44'; Goals: Sezer (4/5) 11', 30', 37', 66 (p)' Sin bin: Bourouh (yellow card) 51' to 61'	Stadium: Wheldon Road; Attendance: 7,458; Referee: Liam Moore

Round 7: Sat 12 April	Castleford Tigers	6–20	Leigh Leopards	Castleford
20:00 BST	Tries: Cini 74'; Goals: Milnes (1/1) 75'; Sin bin: Lawler (yellow card) 10' to 20'; Namo (yellow card) 65' to 75'	BBC Report; Sky Report	Tries: Ipape 4'; McIntosh 35', 51'; Hodgson 43'; Goals: O'Brien (2/4) 5', 11 (p)' McIntosh (0/1)	Stadium: Wheldon Road; Attendance: 5,807; Referee: Chris Kendall

Round 8: Thu 17 April	Wakefield Trinity	13–12	Castleford Tigers	Wakefield
20:00 BST	Tries: Smith 60'; Jowitt 67'; Goals: Jowitt (2/2) 62', 68'; Drop goals: Lino 76'	BBC Report; Sky Report	Tries: Qareqare 10', 36'; Wood 28'; Goals: Milnes (0/3)	Stadium: Belle Vue; Attendance: 7,807; Referee: Aaron Moore

Round 9: Sat 26 April	Huddersfield Giants	12–30	Castleford Tigers	Huddersfield
15:00 BST	Tries: Gagai 8'; Wilson 67'; Goals: Flanagan (2/2) 9', 68'	BBC Report; Sky Report	Tries: I. Senior 3', 47'; Simm 21'; Mellor 26'; Milnes 60'; Goals: Milnes (5/6) 23', 28', 38 (p)', 48', 61'; Sin bin: Westerman (yellow card) 33' to 43'	Stadium: Kirklees Stadium; Attendance: 3,637; Referee: Marcus Griffiths

Round 10: Sun 4 May	Castleford Tigers	8–32	Wakefield Trinity	Newcastle upon Tyne
17:30 BST	Tries: Simm 32'; Wood 59'; Goals: Milnes (0/2)	BBC Report; Sky Report	Tries: Jowitt 9'; Faatili 15', 71'; Walmsley 37', 69'; Johnstone 43'; Goals: Jowitt (4/6) 10', 16', 44', 73'	Stadium: St James' Park; Attendance: 32,862; Referee: Tom Grant

Round 11: Sun 18 May	Castleford Tigers	48–16	Salford Red Devils	Castleford
17:30 BST	Tries: Hoy 7', 38', 63'; Cini 19'; I. Senior 27'; Mustapha 57'; Mellor 73'; Asi 78'; Goals: Milnes (8/8) 8', 21', 28', 40', 59', 64', 73', 79'	BBC Report; Sky Report	Tries: Foster 43'; Macdonald 48', 77'; Goals: Brierley (2/3) 45', 78'	Stadium: Wheldon Road; Attendance: 5,469; Referee: Marcus Griffiths

Round 12: Sat 24 May	Castleford Tigers	6–29	Leeds Rhinos	Castleford
14:30 BST	Tries: L. Senior 41'; Goals: Milnes (1/1) 43'; Sin bin: Horne (yellow card) 8' to 18'	BBC Report; Sky Report	Tries: Lisone 32', 74'; Newman 50', 67'; Hall 55'; Goals: Connor (4/5) 33', 56', 69', 75'; Drop goals: Connor 39'	Stadium: Wheldon Road; Attendance: 8,069; Referee: Liam Rush

Round 13: Fri 30 May	Warrington Wolves	34–24	Castleford Tigers	Warrington
20:00 BST	Tries: Josh Thewlis 10'; Jake Thewlis 15'; Tai 20'; Lindop 35'; Currie 54'; Ratchford 74'; Goals: Sneyd (4/5) 17', 20', 36', 55'; Ratchford (1/1) 75'	BBC Report; Sky Report	Tries: Lawler 30', 64'; I. Senior 69'; Simm 80'; Goals: Milnes (4/4) 32', 65', 70', 80'	Stadium: Halliwell Jones Stadium; Attendance: 8,625; Referee: Marcus Griffiths

Round 14: Fri 13 June	Hull FC	14–22	Castleford Tigers	Kingston upon Hull
20:00 BST	Tries: Barron 14'; Martin 75', 77'; Goals: Sezer (1/2) 15'; Hardaker (0/1)	BBC Report; Sky Report	Tries: I. Senior 4'; L. Senior 23'; Asi 56'; Amone 72'; Goals: Milnes (3/4) 5', 24', 58'	Stadium: MKM Stadium; Attendance: 13,376; Referee: Aaron Moore

Round 15: Thu 19 June	Castleford Tigers	0–48	Hull Kingston Rovers	Castleford
20:00 BST		BBC Report; Sky Report	Tries: Broadbent 4', 79'; Booth 10', 66'; Davies 25', 73'; Mourgue 32'; Whitbread 55'; Hiku 70'; Goals: Mourgue (6/9) 5', 12', 56', 67', 71', 80'	Stadium: Wheldon Road; Attendance: 7,650; Referee: Liam Moore

Round 16: Sat 28 June	Castleford Tigers	20–26	Wigan Warriors	Castleford
20:00 BST	Tries: Tate 15', 73'; Asi 42'; Wood 48'; Goals: Atkin (2/4) 44', 50'	BBC Report; Sky Report	Tries: Field 18'; Keighran 40'; Eckersley 67'; Farrell 77'; Goals: Keighran (5/5) 20', 40', 69', 77 (p)', 79'	Stadium: Wheldon Road; Attendance: 6,052; Referee: Tom Grant

Round 17: Thu 3 July	Castleford Tigers	12–30	Huddersfield Giants	Castleford
20:00 BST	Tries: Lawler 37'; Cini 40'; Goals: Milnes (2/2) 38', 40'	BBC Report; Sky Report	Tries: Lolohea 5', 79'; Halsall 33'; Milne 51'; Flanagan 70'; Goals: Flanagan (5/6) 6', 34', 65 (p)', 72', 80'; Sin bin: Woolford (yellow card) 1' to 11'	Stadium: Wheldon Road; Attendance: 6,669; Referee: James Vella

Round 18: Sun 13 July	Salford Red Devils	26–22	Castleford Tigers	Salford
15:00 BST	Tries: Ryan 9'; Wilson 37'; Mellor 40'; Marsters 52'; Hankinson 58'; Goals: Hankinson (3/5) 39', 40', 53'	BBC Report; Sky Report	Tries: Simm 18'; Asi 25', 44'; Lawler 78'; Goals: Atkin (3/4) 26', 46', 78'	Stadium: Salford Community Stadium; Attendance: 2,051; Referee: Aaron Moore

Round 19: Sun 20 July	Castleford Tigers	20–14	Warrington Wolves	Castleford
15:00 BST	Tries: Asi 12'; Lawler 19'; Simm 65'; Goals: Atkin (4/4) 14', 20', 60 (p)', 66'; Sin bin: Mellor (yellow card) 67' to 77'	BBC Report; Sky Report	Tries: Stone 7'; Jake Thewlis 35'; Ratchford 69'; Goals: Sneyd (1/3) 9'	Stadium: Wheldon Road; Attendance: 6,384; Referee: Jack Smith

Round 20: Fri 1 August	St Helens	40–0	Castleford Tigers	St Helens
20:00 BST	Tries: Percival 6'; Dagnall 10', 68'; Feldt 21'; Clark 29'; Robertson 37'; Sailor 71'; Goals: Feldt (6/7) 7', 22', 30', 39', 69', 72'	BBC Report; Sky Report		Stadium: Totally Wicked Stadium; Attendance: 9,824; Referee: Aaron Moore

Round 21: Sat 9 August	Hull Kingston Rovers	36–6	Castleford Tigers	Kingston upon Hull
15:00 BST	Tries: Burgess 19', 26', 72'; Litten 36'; Martin 51'; Lewis 59'; Mourgue 65'; Goals: Mourgue (4/7) 27', 37', 60', 66'	BBC Report; Sky Report	Tries: Mellor 30'; Goals: Asi (1/1) 32'; Sin bin: Simbiken (yellow card) 21' to 31'	Stadium: Craven Park; Attendance: 11,038; Referee: Tom Grant

Round 22: Sat 16 August	Castleford Tigers	6–64	Leeds Rhinos	Castleford
15:00 BST	Tries: Windley 76'; Goals: Atkin (1/1) 77'	BBC Report; Sky Report	Tries: Newman 5'; Miller 10'; Cassell 19'; Croft 21', 64'; Bentley 31'; Hall 39', 50'; Handley 45', 73'; Connor 60'; Goals: Connor (9/10) 6', 11', 20', 23', 32', 40', 46', 61', 66'; Hankinson (1/1) 75'	Stadium: Wheldon Road; Attendance: 7,861; Referee: Aaron Moore

Round 23: Sat 23 August	Catalans Dragons	38–4	Castleford Tigers	Perpignan
19:00 CEST	Tries: Smith 23', 40', 80'; Yaha 49'; Keary 62'; Aispuro-Bichet 65'; Da Costa 75'; Goals: Aispuro-Bichet (4/6) 40', 63', 66', 76'; Séguier (1/1) 80'	BBC Report; Sky Report	Tries: Lindsey 13'; Goals: Atkin (0/1)	Stadium: Stade Gilbert Brutus; Attendance: 7,269; Referee: Liam Rush

Round 24: Thu 28 August	Leigh Leopards	46–6	Castleford Tigers	Leigh
20:00 BST	Tries: Halton 4'; Lam 13'; Brand 20', 75'; Charnley 26'; Tuitavake 53', 61'; Dwyer 57'; Goals: O'Brien (7/7) 5', 15', 21', 28', 54', 58', 62'; Hodgson (0/1)	BBC Report; Sky Report	Tries: Hoy 69'; Goals: Asi (1/1) 70'	Stadium: Leigh Sports Village; Attendance: 8,330; Referee: Liam Moore

Round 25: Fri 5 September	Castleford Tigers	26–22	Wakefield Trinity	Castleford
20:00 BST	Tries: Atkin 14'; Wallis 24'; Wood 29'; Mellor 53'; Horne 65'; Goals: Asi (1/3) 16'; Hoy (2/2) 55', 66'	BBC Report; Sky Report	Tries: Johnstone 5'; Rourke 36', 46'; Nikotemo 72'; Goals: Lino (3/4) 37', 47', 72'	Stadium: Wheldon Road; Attendance: 7,532; Referee: Aaron Moore

Round 26: Fri 12 September	Wigan Warriors	62–6	Castleford Tigers	Wigan
20:00 BST	Tries: Miski 6', 49'; Field 13', 71'; Marshall 23', 28'; Farrimond 33', 38'; Hill 61'; Eckersley 68'; Havard 76'; Goals: Farrimond (9/11) 8', 15', 25', 34', 40', 62', 69', 73', 77'	BBC Report; Sky Report	Tries: Mustapha 65'; Goals: Hoy (1/1) 66'	Stadium: Brick Community Stadium; Attendance: 15,224; Referee: Aaron Moore

Round 27: Fri 19 September	St Helens	26–24	Castleford Tigers	St Helens
20:00 BST	Tries: Stephens 4'; Feldt 32', 45'; Bell 36'; Bennison 64'; Goals: Feldt (3/4) 6', 37', 46'; Bennison (0/1)	BBC Report; Sky Report	Tries: Tate 9', 28', 77'; Wood 74'; Horne 78'; Goals: Hoy (2/5) 29', 78'	Stadium: Totally Wicked Stadium; Attendance: 10,058; Referee: Liam Rush

=== League table ===
Pos	Team	Pld	W	D	L	PF	PA	PD	Pts	Qualification
1	Hull Kingston Rovers (L, C)	27	22	0	5	786	292	+494	44	Advance to Semi-finals
2	Wigan Warriors	27	21	0	6	794	333	+461	42	Advance to Semi-finals
3	Leigh Leopards	27	19	1	7	619	452	+167	39	Advance to Eliminators
4	Leeds Rhinos	27	18	0	9	610	310	+300	36	Advance to Eliminators
5	St Helens	27	17	0	10	677	314	+363	34	Advance to Eliminators
6	Wakefield Trinity (Note: Salford forfeited their game against Wakefield. Under RFL operational rules, the game is recorded as a 48–0 victory for Wakefield, and converse loss for Salford, with the points scored and conceded applying to both teams.)	27	15	0	12	688	458	+230	30	Advance to Eliminators
7	Hull FC	27	13	1	13	539	461	+78	27	
8	Warrington Wolves	27	10	0	17	480	641	−161	20	
9	Catalans Dragons	27	10	0	17	425	652	−227	20	
10	Huddersfield Giants	27	7	0	20	347	738	−391	14	
11	Castleford Tigers	27	6	0	21	396	815	−419	12	
12	Salford Red Devils (R)	27	3	0	24	234	1129	−895	4 (Note: On 22 September 2025, Salford Red Devils were deducted two points breaching "a number of RFL operational rules" surrounding their team selection for their Round 1 fixture against St Helens on 15 February 2025.)	Relegated to Championship

(C) Champions; (L) League Leaders' Shield Winners; (R) Relegated

== Challenge Cup ==
Under the new competition format, Castleford entered the 2025 Challenge Cup in the Third Round, scheduled to be played in early February prior to the start of the Super League season. As a top flight club, they were guaranteed an away tie against non-Super League opposition. In the Third Round draw on 14 January, Castleford were selected to face the winners of the Second Round tie between Bradford Bulls and Doncaster. Bradford progressed to face Castleford, with the match being chosen for broadcast by the BBC.

Third round: Sun 9 February	Bradford Bulls	18–16	Castleford Tigers	Bradford
13:00 GMT	Tries: Donaldson 6'; Gee 17'; Holmes 40'; Goals: Meadows (2/4) 18', 24 (p)' Drop goals: Keyes 34'; Lilley 75'	BBC Report; Sky Report	Tries: Simbiken 56'; Simm 58'; Hoy 79'; Goals: Hoy (2/3) 57', 59'	Stadium: Odsal Stadium; Attendance: 2,946; Referee: Liam Moore

== Player statistics ==
=== Summary ===
Appearances and points in all competitions
No	Player	App	T	G	DG	Pts	Temporarily suspended	Sent off (straight red)
1	(Australia) Tex Hoy	18	6	20	0	64	0	0
2	(Fiji) Jason Qareqare	1	2	0	0	8	0	0
3	(Australia) Zac Cini	22	5	0	0	20	0	0
4	(England) Sam Wood	24	5	0	0	20	0	0
5	(Ireland) Innes Senior	16	7	0	0	28	1	0
6	(Samoa) Daejarn Asi	28	6	3	0	30	0	0
7	(England) Rowan Milnes	12	2	25	0	58	0	0
8	(England) Liam Watts	1	0	0	0	0	0	0
9	(Papua New Guinea) Liam Horne	19	3	0	0	12	1	0
10	(England) George Lawler	28	5	0	0	20	1	0
11	(Papua New Guinea) Jeremiah Simbiken	14	2	0	0	8	1	0
12	(England) Alex Mellor	26	4	0	0	16	1	0
13	(England) Joe Westerman	24	0	0	0	0	1	0
14	(Papua New Guinea) Judah Rimbu	10	1	0	0	4	0	0
15	(England) George Griffin	22	0	0	0	0	0	0
16	(England) Cain Robb	13	0	0	0	0	0	0
17	(England) Luke Hooley	0	0	0	0	0	0	0
18	(England) Josh Hodson	4	0	0	0	0	0	0
19	(England) Sam Hall	15	0	0	0	0	0	0
20	(Nigeria) Muizz Mustapha	17	3	0	0	12	0	0
21	(Papua New Guinea) Sylvester Namo	7	1	0	0	4	1	0
22	(Ireland) Louis Senior	17	2	0	0	8	0	0
23	(England) Fletcher Rooney	8	2	0	0	8	0	0
24	(England) Josh Simm	21	8	0	0	32	0	0
25	(England) Will Tate	5	5	0	0	20	0	0
26	(England) George Hill	7	0	0	0	0	0	0
27	(England) Jenson Windley	3	1	0	0	4	0	0
28	(Estonia) Akim Matvejev	0	0	0	0	0	0	0
29	(England) Alfie Horwell	0	0	0	0	0	0	0
30	(England) Daniel Sarbah	0	0	0	0	0	0	0
31	(England) Kieran Hudson	0	0	0	0	0	0	0
32	(England) Woody Walker	0	0	0	0	0	0	0
33	(England) Sam Darley	0	0	0	0	0	0	0
34	(England) Jacob Hall	0	0	0	0	0	0	0
35	(Nigeria) Daniel Okoro	8	0	0	0	0	0	0
36	(England) Ben Davies	1	0	0	0	0	0	0
37	(England) Lee Kershaw	3	0	0	0	0	0	0
38	(Ireland) Brad Singleton	21	0	0	0	0	0	0
39	(France) Hugo Salabio	5	0	0	0	0	0	0
40	(France) Jordan Dezaria	3	0	0	0	0	0	0
41	(Australia) Tom Amone	15	1	0	0	4	0	0
42	(England) Chris Atkin	16	1	10	0	24	0	0
43	(Australia) Joe Stimson	11	0	0	0	0	0	0
44	(England) Andy Djeukessi	1	0	0	0	0	0	0
45	(Nigeria) Elliot Wallis	6	1	0	0	4	0	0
46	(England) Alfie Lindsey	2	1	0	0	4	0	0

Source: RLRKC – Castleford Tigers 2025

=== Appearances ===
Positions key:
FB = Fullback	RW = Right wing	RC = Right centre	LC = Left centre	LW = Left wing	SO = Stand-off	SH = Scrum half
PR = Prop	HK = Hooker	SR = Second row	LF = Loose forward	R = Replacement	18 = 18th man	(* = Non-playing)

Appearances and positions in each fixture
No	Player	CC	SL																										
No	Player	R6	1	2	3	4	5	6	7	8	9	10	11	12	13	14	15	16	17	18	19	20	21	22	23	24	25	26	27
1	(Australia) Tex Hoy	SH	SH	SH	SH	SH	FB	FB	FB	FB	FB	FB	FB	FB	FB											FB	FB	FB	SH
2	(Fiji) Jason Qareqare									LW																			
3	(Australia) Zac Cini	LC	LC	LC	LC	RC	RC	RC	RC	RC	RC	RC	RC	RC	RC	FB	FB	FB	FB	LC	RC	RC							FB
4	(England) Sam Wood	RC	RC	RC	RC	LC	LC	LC	LC	LC	LC	LC	LC			LC	LC	LC	LC	LW	R	R	RC	RC			RC	RC	RC
5	(Ireland) Innes Senior	LW	LW	LW	LW	LW	LW	LW			LW	LW	LW	LW	LW	LW	LW		LW		LW								
6	(Samoa) Daejarn Asi	SO	SO	SO	SO	SO	SO	SO	SO	SO	SO	SO	SO	SO	SO	SO	SO	SO	SO	SO	SO	SO	SO	SO	SO	SO	SO	SO	SO
7	(England) Rowan Milnes						SH	SH	SH	SH	SH	SH	SH	SH	SH	SH	SH		R										
8	(England) Liam Watts	R																											
9	(Papua New Guinea) Liam Horne	HK	LF	LF	HK	R	LF	18*	HK	HK	18*	18*	HK	HK	LF	HK	HK	HK							HK	HK	HK	HK	HK
10	(England) George Lawler	PR	PR	PR	PR	SR	PR	PR	PR	PR	LF	SR	PR	PR	SR	SR	SR	SR	SR	R	HK	HK	LF	SR	LF	LF	PR	PR	PR
11	(Papua New Guinea) Jeremiah Simbiken	SR	SR	SR	SR		SR		SR	SR	SR									SR	SR		SR		SR	SR	SR		
12	(England) Alex Mellor			SR	SR	SR	SR	SR	SR	SR	SR	SR	SR	SR	SR	SR	SR	SR	SR	SR	SR	SR	SR	SR	SR	RC	SR	SR	SR
13	(England) Joe Westerman	LF	PR	PR	LF			LF	LF	R	R	R	SR	SR		R	R	LF	LF	LF	LF	LF	SH	LF		R	LF	LF	LF
14	(Papua New Guinea) Judah Rimbu	R	HK	HK	R	R	R	HK		R	HK	HK																	
15	(England) George Griffin	PR	R	R	R	PR	R	R	R	18*					R	R	R	R	R	R	R	R	R	R	R		R	R	R
16	(England) Cain Robb					HK	HK	R	R				18*	18*	18*					HK	R	R	HK	HK	R	R	R	R	18*
17	(England) Luke Hooley			18*	18*	18*																							
18	(England) Josh Hodson	SR	SR	R*				SR															LC						
19	(England) Sam Hall												R	R	R	R	R	R	R	R	18*	R	R	R	18*	R	R	R	R
20	(Nigeria) Muizz Mustapha	R	R	R	R	R	R	R	PR	LF			LF	R								18*	R	R	R	R	18*	R	R
21	(Papua New Guinea) Sylvester Namo	R	R	R	PR	R	R		R																				
22	(Ireland) Louis Senior												R	LC	LC	RC	RC	RC	RC	RC	LC	LC	LW	LC	LC	LC	LC	LC	LC
23	(England) Fletcher Rooney	FB	FB	FB	FB	FB														FB	FB	FB							
24	(England) Josh Simm	RW	RW			RW	RW	RW	RW	RW	RW	RW	RW	RW	RW	RW	RW	RW	RW	RW	RW	RW	RW	RW					
25	(England) Will Tate																	LW	18*						RC		RW	RW	RW
26	(England) George Hill				R	LF	18*								R	R*	R	R	HK	18*			18*	18*				18*	R
27	(England) Jenson Windley								18*														FB	FB	FB				
28	(Estonia) Akim Matvejev																												
29	(England) Alfie Horwell																												
30	(England) Daniel Sarbah																												
31	(England) Kieran Hudson																												
32	(England) Woody Walker																												
33	(England) Sam Darley																												
34	(England) Jacob Hall																												
35	(Nigeria) Daniel Okoro	18*	18*			PR		R	R	PR	R	R		R	PR	18*	18*	18*											
36	(England) Ben Davies		R																										
37	(England) Lee Kershaw			RW	RW				LW																				
38	(Ireland) Brad Singleton						PR	PR			R	LF	R	LF	PR	PR	PR	PR	PR	R	PR	PR	R	PR	PR	PR	R	PR	PR
39	(France) Hugo Salabio									R	R	R			R										R	18*			
40	(France) Jordan Dezaria									R	PR	PR																	
41	(Australia) Tom Amone										PR	PR	PR	PR		PR	PR	PR	PR	PR	PR	PR	PR	PR	PR	PR			
42	(England) Chris Atkin											R	R	R	HK	LF	LF	SH	SH	SH	SH	SH		SH	SH	SH	SH	SH	
43	(Australia) Joe Stimson																	R	R	PR	R	SR	PR	R		SR	PR	SR	SR
44	(England) Andy Djeukessi																					LW							
45	(Nigeria) Elliot Wallis																							LW	LW	LW	LW	LW	LW
46	(England) Alfie Lindsey																								RW	RW			

Sources: RLRKC – Castleford Tigers 2025 & RLP – Castleford Tigers 2025
