= Josh Simm =

English rugby league footballer

Personal information
- Full name: Joshua William Simm
- Born: 27 February 2001 (age 25) St Helens, Lancashire, England
- Height: 6 ft 0 in (1.83 m)
- Weight: 15 st 2 lb (96 kg)

Playing information
- Position: Centre, Wing
Club
Years	Team	Pld	T	G	FG	P
2019–22	St Helens	19	7	0	0	28
2019(loan)	→ Leigh Centurions	4	1	0	0	4
2021(loan)	→ Leigh Centurions	1	0	0	0	0
2022(loan)	→ Hull FC	5	2	0	0	8
2023	Wynnum Manly Seagulls	23	8	0	0	32
2024–25	Castleford Tigers	28	13	0	0	52
2026	Catalans Dragons	4	1	0	0	4
2026(loan)	→ Saint-Estève XIII Catalan	3	3	0	0	12
2026–	Oldham RLFC	5	1	0	0	4
	Total	92	36	0	0	144
- Source: As of 20 October 2026
- Relatives: Geoff Pimblett (grandfather)

Josh Simm (born 27 February 2001) is an English professional rugby league footballer who plays as a centre or winger for Oldham RLFC in the RFL Championship. He is the grandson of St Helens legend Geoff Pimblett.

He has previously played for St Helens and Castleford Tigers in the Super League and the Wynnum Manly Seagulls in the Queensland Cup. He has spent time on loan at Leigh Centurions in both the Championship and the Super League, and at Hull FC in the Super League.

== Background ==
Simm was born in St Helens, England. He is the grandson of St Helens legend Geoff Pimblett.

== Playing career ==
=== St Helens ===
In the 2019 under 19s academy season, Simm scored a total of 30 tries in 20 games, beating his previous season's total of 29 tries in 23 games.

Simm made his Super League début for St Helens against the London Broncos in July 2019.

Simm would go on to score his first Super League try in round 17 of the 2020 Super League season vs Leeds Rhinos, where he scored a hat-trick in a man of the match performance.

Simm made seven appearances for the St Helens in 2022 including the Challenge Cup semi-final defeat to Wigan Warriors. The outside back also made a further five Super League appearances for Hull FC where he spent the second half of last season on loan, scoring two tries.

==== Leigh Centurions (loan) ====
On 13 April 2021, it was reported that he had signed for Leigh in the Super League on a short-term loan.

=== Wynnum Manly Seagulls ===
In October, St Helens announced Simm would be moving on elsewhere. On 24 October, Simm signed for the Wynnum Manly Seagulls in the Queensland Cup in Australia for the 2023 season.

=== Castleford Tigers ===
On 3 October 2023, the Castleford Tigers announced the signing of Simm on a two-year deal. He said, "I'm absolutely buzzing, I really can't wait! The Cas fans can expect full commitment, and 100% effort in every game, and I pride myself in being able to score from anywhere in attack."

Simm was assigned squad number 2 ahead of the 2024 season. He made his Castleford debut in round 1 against the Wigan Warriors, and scored his first try in round 3 against the Warrington Wolves. In round 5, he scored two tries against the Catalans Dragons.

In the first game of the 2025 season, Simm made his first appearance in 10 months and scored a length-of-the-field try against Bradford in the Challenge Cup. He finished the year as Castleford's top tryscorer with 8 in 21 appearances.

=== Catalans Dragons ===
On 6 September 2025, it was announced that Simm would join Catalans Dragons in the Super League from 2026 on a two-year deal.

=== Oldham RLFC ===
On 1 August 2026 it was reported that he had signed for Oldham RLFC in the RFL Championship until the end of the 2026 season

== Statistics ==
Appearances and points in all competitions by year
Club	Season	Tier	App	T	G	DG	Pts
St Helens	2019	Super League	1	0	0	0	0
St Helens	2020	Super League	6	3	0	0	12
St Helens	2021	Super League	4	0	0	0	0
St Helens	2022	Super League	8	4	0	0	16
St Helens	Total		19	7	0	0	28
→ Leigh Centurions (loan)	2019	Championship	4	1	0	0	4
→ Leigh Centurions (loan)	2021	Super League	1	0	0	0	0
→ Leigh Centurions (loan)	Total		5	1	0	0	4
→ Hull FC (loan)	2022	Super League	5	2	0	0	8
Wynnum Manly Seagulls	2023	Queensland Cup	23	8	0	0	32
Castleford Tigers	2024	Super League	7	5	0	0	20
Castleford Tigers	2025	Super League	21	8	0	0	32
Castleford Tigers	Total		28	13	0	0	52
Catalans Dragons	2026	Super League	4	1	0	0	4
Oldham RLFC	2026	RFL Championship	5	1	0	0	4
Oldham RLFC	2027	RFL Championship	0	0	0	0	0
Oldham RLFC	Total		5	1	0	0	4
Career total			84	32	0	0	124

As of match played 16 August 2025
