= Tom Amone =

Australian rugby league footballer

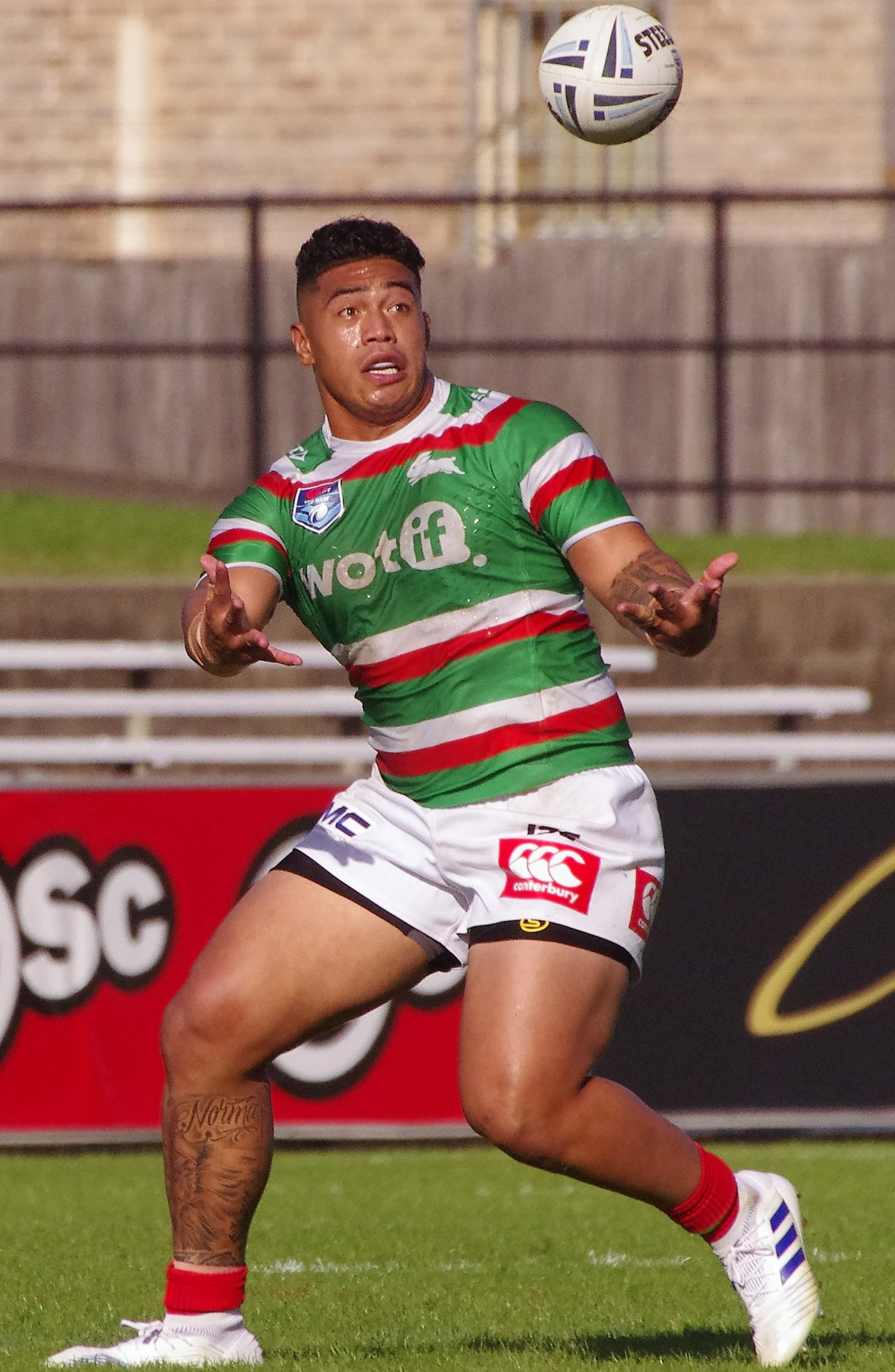

Personal information
- Full name: Taealoaloa Tom Amone
- Born: 19 December 1996 (age 29) Westmead, New South Wales, Australia
- Height: 5 ft 11 in (1.81 m)
- Weight: 17 st 5 lb (110 kg)

Playing information
- Position: Prop
Club
Years	Team	Pld	T	G	FG	P
2019–20	South Sydney	9	0	0	0	0
2021	Wests Tigers	8	0	0	0	0
2022–24	Leigh Leopards	87	17	0	0	68
2025	Canterbury Bulldogs	0	0	0	0	0
2025	Castleford Tigers	15	1	0	0	4
2026–	Hull Kingston Rovers	29	5	0	0	20
	Total	148	23	0	0	92
- Source: As of 14 October 2026

Tom Amone (born 19 December 1996) is an Australian professional rugby league footballer who plays as a prop forward for Hull Kingston Rovers in the Super League.

He has previously played for the South Sydney Rabbitohs and Wests Tigers in the National Rugby League, and for Leigh Leopards and Castleford Tigers in the Super League.

== Background ==
Amone was born in Westmead, New South Wales, Australia. Amone is of Tongan descent.

== Playing career ==
=== South Sydney Rabbitohs ===
Amone played for the Blacktown Workers Sea Eagles in the Intrust Super Premiership NSW for the 2018 season and gained the attention of South Sydney who signed him on a two-year deal beginning in 2019. Amone made his NRL debut in round 14 of the 2019 NRL season for South Sydney in their 19-18 loss to the Penrith Panthers. On 9 November 2020, Amone was released by South Sydney.

=== Leigh Leopards ===
On 1 December 2021, it was reported that he had signed for Leigh in the RFL Championship.

On 12 August 2023, Amone played for Leigh in their 2023 Challenge Cup final victory over Hull Kingston Rovers. Amone played 28 games for Leigh in the 2023 Super League season as the club finished fifth on the table and qualified for the playoffs. He played in their elimination playoff loss against Hull Kington Rovers.

=== Canterbury-Bankstown Bulldogs ===
On 22 May 2024, Amone signed a two-year deal to join NRL side Canterbury ahead of the 2025 NRL season.

Amone did not make an appearance for Canterbury-Bankstown in the NRL, playing five reserve-grade games for the club. On 14 April 2025, the Canterbury club announced that they had released Amone from the remainder of his playing contract.

=== Castleford Tigers ===
Following his departure from Canterbury, Amone made a return to the Super League with Castleford Tigers, signing in April on a deal until the end of the 2025 season. He made his Tigers debut in round 9 against Huddersfield and scored his first try in the round 14 win against Hull FC. Amone sustained an ankle injury during the first half against Leigh in round 24, which ruled him out for the remainder of the campaign. Having made 15 appearances for Castleford, he departed at the conclusion of the year to complete his move Hull KR.

=== Hull Kingston Rovers ===
In April 2025, Hull Kingston Rovers announced that Amone would join on a three-year contract from 2026 after his spell with Castleford. Amone made his debut for Hull Kingston Rovers in the 2026 World Club Challenge against the Brisbane Broncos at the MKM Stadium, scoring the opening try of the fixture within the first five minutes.
