= Jeremiah Simbiken =

Papua New Guinea international rugby league footballer

Jerry Simbiken
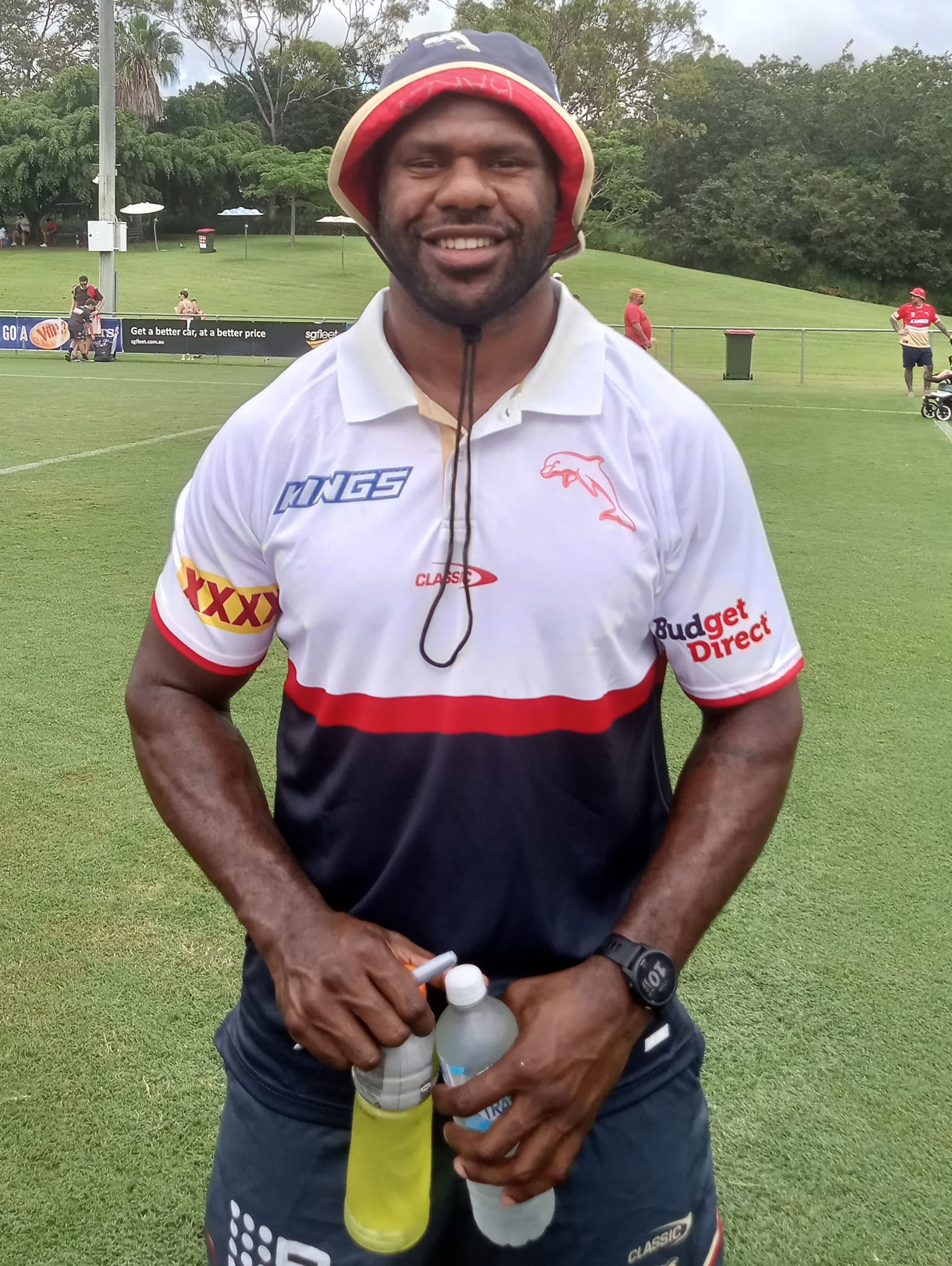

Personal information
- Full name: Jeremiah Simbiken
- Born: 17 August 2000 (age 26) Goroka, Eastern Highlands Province, Papua New Guinea
- Height: 6 ft 1 in (1.86 m)
- Weight: 15 st 2 lb (96 kg)

Playing information
- Position: Second-row, Loose forward
Club
Years	Team	Pld	T	G	FG	P
2022–23	Redcliffe Dolphins	33	18	0	0	72
2024	Norths Devils	23	11	0	0	44
2025	Castleford Tigers	14	2	0	0	8
2026–	London Broncos	2	0	0	0	0
	Total	72	31	0	0	124
Representative
Years	Team	Pld	T	G	FG	P
2022–	Papua New Guinea	5	0	0	0	0
2023	PNG Prime Minister's XIII	1	0	0	0	0
- Source: As of 23 March 2026

Jeremiah Simbiken (born 17 August 2000) is a Papua New Guinean professional rugby league footballer who plays as a second-row forward for the London Broncos in the Super League and Papua New Guinea at international level.

He previously played for the Redcliffe Dolphins and Norths Devils in the QLD Cup, as well as being contracted to the Dolphins in the NRL. Simbiken has also played for the Castleford Tigers in the Super League.

== Background ==
Simbiken was born in Goroka, Papua New Guinea but is originally from Wewak in the East Sepik Province of Papua New Guinea. He moved to Canberra, Australia when he was 10 years old.

Simbiken was a member of the Canberra Raiders junior system.

== Club career ==
=== Redcliffe Dolphins ===
In the 2022 Queensland Cup state competition, Simbiken debuted for the Redcliffe Dolphins and scored a total of thirteen tries in sixteen matches.

=== Dolphins ===
On 25 August 2022, Simbiken signed a three-year deal with the Dolphins (NRL) club, seeing him hold development contract status with them from 2023.

=== Norths Devils ===
In 2024, Simbiken won the Queensland Cup starting in the second row for the Norths Devils in their Grand Final win against the Redcliffe Dolphins. Two weeks later, he helped the Devils win the NRL State Championship, scoring the opening try against the Newtown Jets.

=== Castleford Tigers ===
On 4 December 2024, the Castleford Tigers announced the signing of Simbiken from the 2025 season. He was assigned squad number 11, and scored a try on debut on 9 February against Bradford in the Challenge Cup. He scored his first Super League try against Leeds Rhinos in round 3, though was also given a two-match suspension for dangerous contact. In April, Simbiken and his Papua New Guinean teammates met with King Charles III in support of the charitable organisation Mission Aviation Fellowship. In the closing stages of Castleford's round 9 win against Huddersfield, Simbiken suffered a knee injury and was helped from the field. Initial scans indicated he would be ruled out for 12 weeks, however following a successful operation this prognosis was improved to 8–10 weeks. After returning to the team in July, Simbiken received three suspensions for minor offences under the new 'penalty points' disciplinary format, and an elbow injury sustained in the round 25 win over Wakefield ended his season early. Despite impressing in his first Super League season, Simbiken opted to depart at the conclusion of his contract.

=== London Broncos ===
On 10 November 2025 it was reported that he had signed for the London Broncos in the RFL Championship.

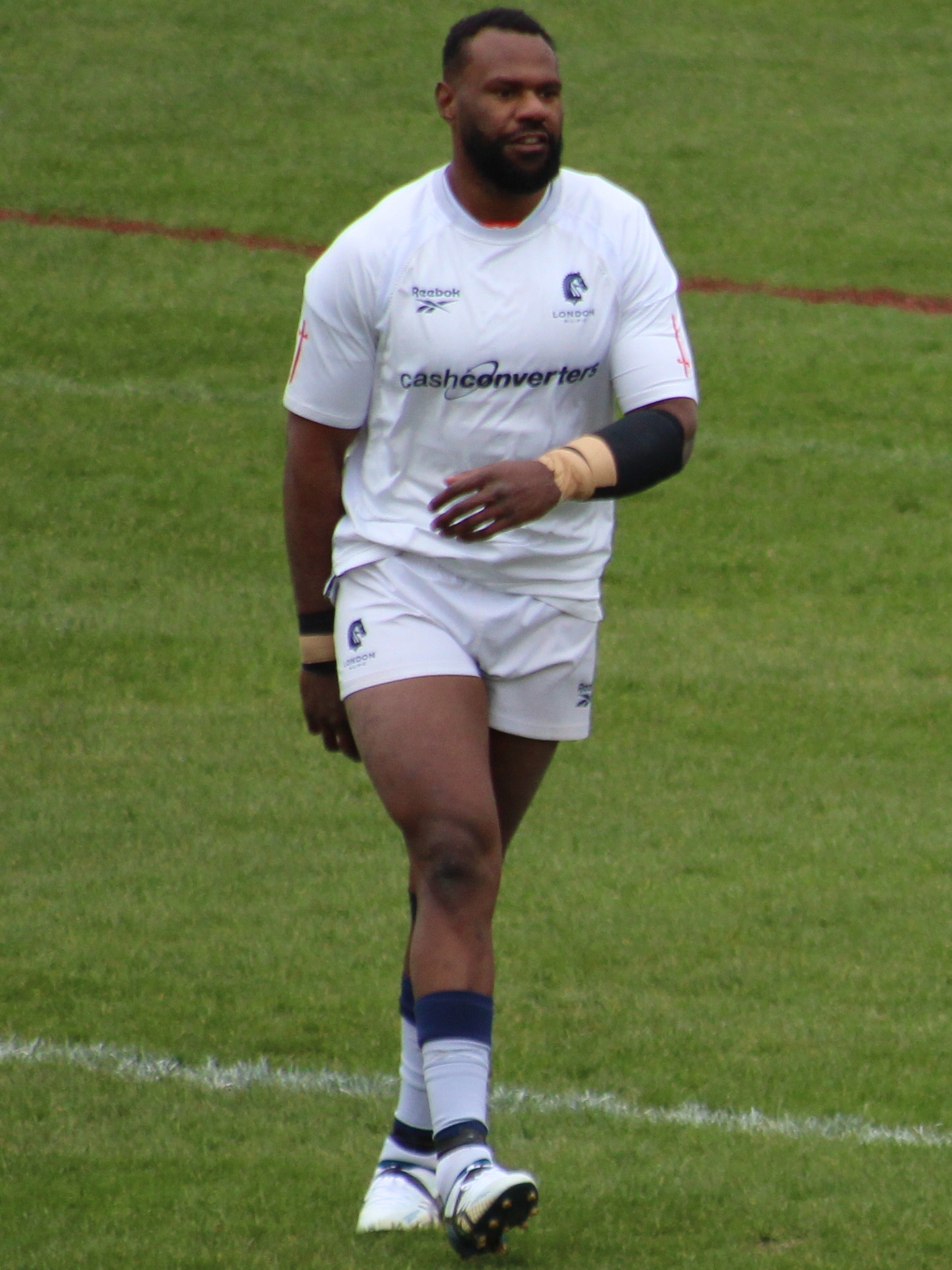
Simbiken warming up for the London Broncos in 2026

In August 2026, he was part of the Broncos squad that lifted the RFL Championship Leaders' Shield.

In 2026 he was part of the London Broncos squad that secured their historic treble of League Leaders' Shield, 1895 Cup and Grand Final victories.

== International career ==
In October 2022, Simbiken was named in the Papua New Guinea squad for the 2021 Rugby League World Cup in England. He made his international debut for PNG on 31 October 2022 against Wales, and also played in the quarter final against England.

Simbiken was included in the Kumuls squad for the 2024 Pacific Championships in October 2024. He featured in all three of PNG's matches, playing against Fiji and the Cook Islands in the group stage and New Zealand in the promotion play-off.

== Club statistics ==
Year	Club	League Competition	Appearances	Tries	Goals	Drop goals	Points	Notes
2022	Redcliffe Dolphins	2022 Queensland Cup	16	13	0	0	52	
2023	Dolphins	2023 NRL season	0	0	0	0	0	Played one pre-season game
2023	Redcliffe Dolphins	2023 Queensland Cup	17	5	0	0	20	Dolphins NRL Affiliate club
2024	Dolphins	2024 NRL season	0	0	0	0	0	Played one pre-season game
2024	Norths Devils	2024 Queensland Cup	23	11	0	0	44	Dolphins NRL Affiliate club
2025	Castleford Tigers	2025 Super League	14	2	0	0	8	
2026	London Broncos	2026 RFL Championship	2	0	0	0	0	
Club career total			72	31	0	0	124	
