= Zeb Taia =

Former NZ & Cook Islands international rugby league footballer

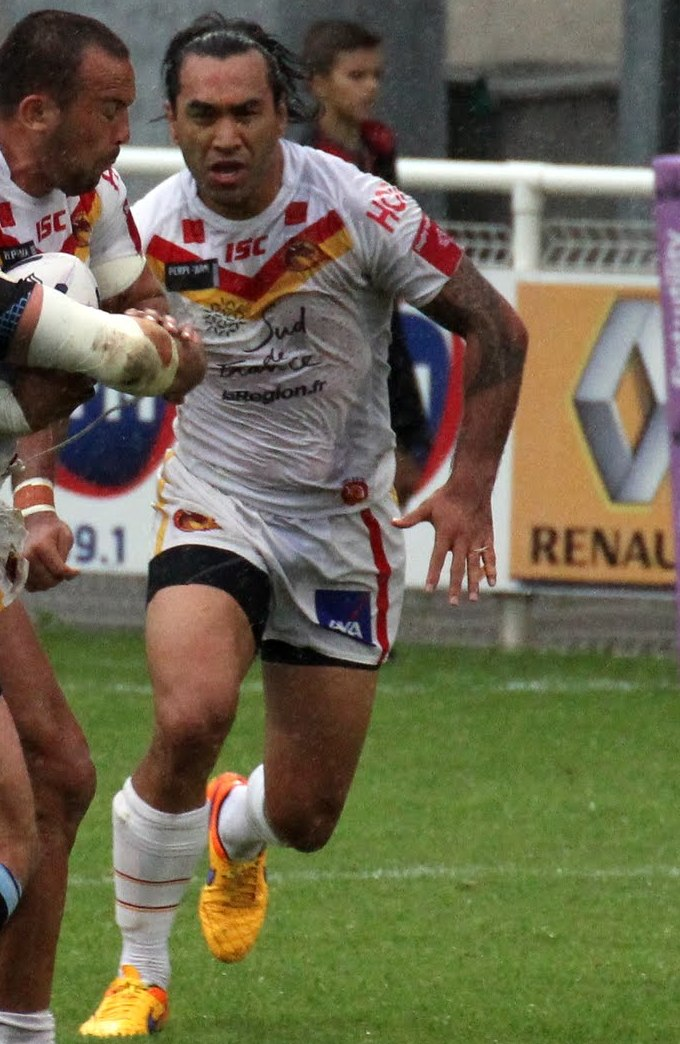

Personal information
- Full name: John Zebelon Taia
- Born: 11 October 1984 (age 42) Auburn, New South Wales, Australia

Playing information
- Height: 186 cm (6 ft 1 in)
- Weight: 104 kg (16 st 5 lb)
- Position: Second-row, Lock, Centre
Club
Years	Team	Pld	T	G	FG	P
2006–07	Parramatta Eels	6	2	0	0	8
2007–12	Newcastle Knights	101	12	0	0	48
2013–15	Catalans Dragons	77	36	0	0	144
2016–17	Gold Coast Titans	24	5	0	0	20
2017–20	St Helens	107	23	0	0	92
	Total	315	78	0	0	312
Representative
Years	Team	Pld	T	G	FG	P
2010	New Zealand	1	0	0	0	0
2012–13	Cook Islands	4	0	0	0	0
2013	Exiles	1	0	0	0	0

Zeb Taia (born 11 October 1984) is a former professional rugby league footballer who played as a second-row forward for both New Zealand and the Cook Islands at international level.

He played for the Parramatta Eels, Newcastle Knights and the Gold Coast Titans in the NRL, and the Catalans Dragons and St Helens in the Super League. Taia has also played for the Exiles, and earlier in his career he played as a lock, centre and prop. He also played for Wynnum Manly in the 2021 Intrust QLD Cup.

== Background ==
Taia was born in Auburn, New South Wales, Australia. He is of Cook Islands descent as his parents are from the island of Penrhyn (Tongareva).

== Playing career ==
He played his junior football for the Enfield Federals and the St Clair Comets before being signed by the Parramatta Eels. He played for the Eels' Premier League reserve-grade team in 2006. In Round 5 of the 2006 NRL season he made his NRL debut for the Eels against the Penrith Panthers.

In 2007, Taia was granted a release from his Eels contract and moved mid-season to the Newcastle Knights. In 2008, Taia established himself as a permanent first-grader with Newcastle.

In the first week of the finals series of 2011, Taia made a comeback from a career threatening neck injury in which he suffered four rounds into the season.

On 16 May 2012, Taia signed a 3-year deal with French Super League club, Catalans Dragons starting in 2013. Taia said about the move, "Whilst my wife and I are looking forward to experiencing life in another country, a beautiful one at that, I am forever indebted to the Knights. Not just for the time I have been here but the support they showed me, particularly last season during a potentially career ending injury."

On 5 August 2015, Taia signed a 2-year contract with the Gold Coast Titans to return to the National Rugby League after three years in France, starting in 2016.

On February 14, 2017, Taia signed for St. Helens in a swap deal taking Joe Greenwood to the Gold Coast Titans. Taia was part of the St Helens side which won both the 2019 League Leaders Shield and the 2019 Super League Grand Final securing the club's 14th championship.

He played in the 2019 Challenge Cup Final defeat by the Warrington Wolves at Wembley Stadium.

He played in the 2019 Super League Grand Final victory over the Salford Red Devils at Old Trafford.

He played in St Helens 8-4 2020 Super League Grand Final victory over Wigan at the Kingston Communications Stadium in Hull. It was his final game as a player as he announced his retirement following the game.

== Representative career ==
For the 2010 Anzac Test, Taia was selected to debut for the New Zealand national rugby league team at second-row forward in their loss against Australia.

On 16 October 2010, Taia represented the Cook Islands against a NSW Country representative side. In the match Taia captained the side. He made his official international debut for the Cook Islands in 2012 in a match against Lebanon.

Zeb captained 'the Kukis' in the 2013 Rugby League World Cup.

== Statistics ==
Year	Team	Games	Tries	Pts
2006	Parramatta Eels	3	1	4
2007	Parramatta Eels	3	1	4
2007	Newcastle Knights	10	1	4
2008	Newcastle Knights	20	1	4
2009	Newcastle Knights	24	4	16
2010	Newcastle Knights	19	3	12
2011	Newcastle Knights	5	2	8
2012	Newcastle Knights	23	1	4
2013	Catalans Dragons	25	13	52
2014	Catalans Dragons	32	12	48
2015	Catalans Dragons	24	13	52
2016	Gold Coast Titans	24	5	20
2017	St Helens	30	6	24
2018	St Helens	31	8	32
2019	St Helens	27	6	24
2020	St Helens	20	3	12
	Totals	315	78	312
