= Callum Hazzard =

English rugby league footballer

Personal information
- Full name: Callum Hazzard
- Born: 15 January 1999 (age 26)
- Height: 6 ft 0 in (1.82 m)
- Weight: 14 st 5 lb (91 kg)

Playing information
- Position: Loose forward, Second-row
Club
Years	Team	Pld	T	G	FG	P
2019–20	St Helens	1	0	0	0	0
2019(loan)	→ North Wales Crusaders	18	5	0	0	20
2021–	North Wales Crusaders	26	4	0	0	16
	Total	45	9	0	0	36
- Source: As of 8 January 2023

Callum Hazzard (born 15 January 1999) is a professional rugby league footballer who plays as a loose forward for the North Wales Crusaders in League 1.

== Career ==
=== St Helens ===
Hazzard made his Super League début for Saints against the London Broncos in July 2019.

He has spent time on loan from Saints at the North Wales Crusaders in Betfed League 1.

=== North Wales Crusaders ===
It was announced on 14 November 2020 that Hazzard would make his move to the North Wales Crusaders permanent.
