= 2025 Super League season results =

2025 British rugby league results

The 2025 season was the 30th season of the Super League, and 131st season of rugby league in Great Britain. The season began on 13 February 2025 with defending champions Wigan Warriors playing at home to the Leigh Leopards.

The full fixture list was released on 21 November 2024, with the newly promoted Wakefield Trinity playing away to Leeds Rhinos in Round One. As Wigan had qualified for the 2025 edition of Rugby League Las Vegas, their round 3 fixture at home to Warrington Wolves on 1 March will be held at the Allegiant Stadium in Paradise, Nevada. Following the 2024 NRL Grand Final, it was announced that reigning champions Penrith Panthers would not be travelling to the UK ahead of the world club challenge, therefore it was cancelled.

All times (including matches played in France and the USA) are UK local time; GMT (UTC±00:00) until 30 March, BST (UTC+01:00) thereafter. All fixtures not played are subject to change.

== Regular season ==
=== Round 1 ===
Home	Score	Away	Match information
Home	Score	Away	Date and time	Venue	Referee	Attendance
Wigan Warriors	0–1 (g.p.)	Leigh Leopards	13 February 2025, 20:00	Brick Community Stadium	Liam Moore	21,478
Hull KR	19–18 (g.p.)	Castleford Tigers	14 February 2025, 20:00	Sewell Group Craven Park	Liam Rush	11,020
Catalans Dragons	4–24	Hull FC	14 February 2025, 20:00	Stade Gilbert Brutus	Chris Kendall	9,273
Leeds Rhinos	12–14	Wakefield Trinity	15 February 2025, 15:00	AMT Headingley Stadium	Aaron Moore	15,364
St Helens	82–0	Salford Red Devils	15 February 2025, 17:30	Totally Wicked Stadium	Jack Smith	12,218
Huddersfield Giants	12–20	Warrington Wolves	16 February 2025, 15:00	John Smith's Stadium	Tom Grant	5,871

=== Round 2 ===
Home	Score	Away	Match information
Home	Score	Away	Date and time	Venue	Referee	Attendance
Wakefield Trinity	12–14	Hull KR	20 February 2025, 20:00	DIY Kitchens Stadium	Jack Smith	8,065
Warrington Wolves	18–12	Catalans Dragons	21 February 2025, 20:00	Halliwell Jones Stadium	Liam Rush	11,157
Hull FC	4–46	Wigan Warriors	21 February 2025, 20:00	MKM Stadium	Aaron Moore	14,751
Salford Red Devils	6–32	Leeds Rhinos	22 February 2025, 15:00	Salford Community Stadium	Liam Moore	5,798
Castleford Tigers	6–46	St Helens	22 February 2025, 20:00	The Mend-A-Hose Jungle	Tom Grant	7,723
Leigh Leopards	24–10	Huddersfield Giants	23 February 2025, 14:30	Leigh Sports Village	Marcus Griffiths	8,440

=== Round 3 ===
Home	Score	Away	Match information
Home	Score	Away	Date and time	Venue	Referee	Attendance
Hull KR	42–0	Salford Red Devils	27 February 2025, 20:00	Sewell Group Craven Park	Aaron Moore	10,515
Huddersfield Giants	10–11	Hull FC	28 February 2025, 20:00	John Smith's Stadium	Tom Grant	4,559
Leigh Leopards	34–6	Catalans Dragons	28 February 2025, 20:00	Leigh Sports Village	Jack Smith	8,011
Wakefield Trinity	6–26	St Helens	1 March 2025, 14:30	DIY Kitchens Stadium	Liam Rush	7,604
Wigan Warriors	48–24	Warrington Wolves	1 March 2025, 21:30	Allegiant Stadium (Note: Game 1 of the 2025 Rugby League Las Vegas event.)	Chris Kendall	45,209 (Note: this was the total attendance combined across all 4 games)
Leeds Rhinos	38–24	Castleford Tigers	2 March 2025, 15:00	AMT Headingley Stadium	Marcus Griffiths	14,234

=== Round 4 ===
Home	Score	Away	Match information
Home	Score	Away	Date and time	Venue	Referee	Attendance
Hull FC	22–22 (g.p.)	Leigh Leopards	6 March 2025, 20:00	MKM Stadium	Tom Grant	9,765
Castleford Tigers	22–14	Salford Red Devils	7 March 2025, 20:00	The Jungle	Chris Kendall	6,295
St Helens	10–20	Hull KR	7 March 2025, 20:00	Totally Wicked Stadium	Jack Smith	11,438
Catalans Dragons	11–0	Leeds Rhinos	8 March 2025, 17:30	Stade Gilbert Brutus	Aaron Moore	8,123
Warrington Wolves	16–30	Wakefield Trinity	9 March 2025, 13:00	Halliwell Jones Stadium	Marcus Griffiths	10,024
Wigan Warriors	44–18	Huddersfield Giants	9 March 2025, 13:00	Brick Community Stadium	Liam Moore	17,625

=== Round 5 ===
Home	Score	Away	Match information
Home	Score	Away	Date and time	Venue	Referee	Attendance
Salford Red Devils	23–10	Huddersfield Giants	20 March 2025, 20:00	Salford Community Stadium	Tom Grant	3,764
St Helens	12–14	Warrington Wolves	21 March 2025, 20:00	Totally Wicked Stadium	Chris Kendall	14,068
Wakefield Trinity	12–16	Hull FC	21 March 2025, 20:00	DIY Kitchens Stadium	Aaron Moore	8,027
Castleford Tigers	4–26	Catalans Dragons	22 March 2025, 15:00	The Mend-A-Hose Jungle	Liam Rush	6,005
Leeds Rhinos	12–10	Wigan Warriors	22 March 2025, 17:30	AMT Headingley Stadium	Jack Smith	15,966
Hull KR	30–0	Leigh Leopards	23 March 2025, 15:00	Sewell Group Craven Park	Liam Moore	11,231

=== Round 6 ===
Home	Score	Away	Match information
Home	Score	Away	Date and time	Venue	Referee	Attendance
Castleford Tigers	14–24	Hull FC	27 March 2025, 20:00	The Mend-A-Hose Jungle	Liam Moore	7,458
Leigh Leopards	14–40	Wakefield Trinity	28 March 2024, 20:00	Leigh Sports Village	Marcus Griffiths	8,050
Warrington Wolves	16–14	Leeds Rhinos	28 March 2024, 20:00	Halliwell Jones Stadium	Tom Grant	10,523
Catalans Dragons	13–14	St Helens	29 March 2025, 17:30	Stade Gilbert Brutus	Jack Smith	9,386
Huddersfield Giants	4–50	Hull KR	30 March 2025, 15:00	John Smith's Stadium	Aaron Moore	5,101
Wigan Warriors	54–0	Salford Red Devils	30 March 2025, 15:00	Brick Community Stadium	Chris Kendall	14,262

=== Round 7 ===
Home	Score	Away	Match information
Home	Score	Away	Date and time	Venue	Referee	Attendance
Salford Red Devils	0–28	Leeds Rhinos	10 April 2025, 20:00	Salford Community Stadium	Liam Rush	4,159
Hull KR	12–28	Wigan Warriors	11 April 2025, 20:00	Sewell Group Craven Park	Jack Smith	10,800
St Helens	26–14	Wakefield Trinity	11 April 2025, 20:00	Totally Wicked Stadium	Tom Grant	10,108
Warrington Wolves	16–28	Hull FC	12 April 2025, 17:30	Halliwell Jones Stadium	Aaron Moore	11,023
Castleford Tigers	6–20	Leigh Leopards	12 April 2025, 20:00	The Mend-A-Hose Jungle	Chris Kendall	5,807
Huddersfield Giants	18–38	Catalans Dragons	13 April 2025, 15:00	John Smith's Stadium	Liam Moore	3,638

=== Round 8 (Rivals Round) ===
Home	Score	Away	Match information
Home	Score	Away	Date and time	Venue	Referee	Attendance
Wakefield Trinity	13–12	Castleford Tigers	17 April 2025, 20:00	DIY Kitchens Stadium	Aaron Moore	7,807
Hull FC	14–28	Hull KR	18 April 2025, 12:30	MKM Stadium	Liam Moore	21,018
Wigan Warriors	24–14	St Helens	18 April 2025, 15:00	Brick Community Stadium	Chris Kendall	24,294
Leeds Rhinos	28–6	Huddersfield Giants	18 April 2025, 17:30	AMT Headingley Stadium	Jack Smith	14,566
Leigh Leopards	18–14	Warrington Wolves	19 April 2025, 13:30	Leigh Sports Village	Tom Grant	9,627
Catalans Dragons	38–10	Salford Red Devils	19 April 2025, 18:00	Stade Gilbert Brutus	Marcus Griffiths	8,768

=== Round 9 ===
Home	Score	Away	Match information
Home	Score	Away	Date and time	Venue	Referee	Attendance
Warrington Wolves	32–18	St Helens	24 April 2025, 20:00	Halliwell Jones Stadium	Liam Moore	10,214
Leeds Rhinos	14–20	Hull KR	25 April 2025, 20:00	AMT Headingley Stadium	Chris Kendall	16,863
Huddersfield Giants	12–30	Castleford Tigers	26 April 2025, 15:00	John Smith's Stadium	Marcus Griffiths	3,367
Catalans Dragons	24–20 (g.p.)	Wakefield Trinity	26 April 2025, 17:30	Stade Gilbert Brutus	Aaron Moore	8,183
Salford Red Devils	6–28	Leigh Leopards	26 April 2025, 17:30	Salford Community Stadium	Liam Rush	5,493
Hull FC	12–36	Wigan Warriors	27 April 2025, 15:00	MKM Stadium	Jack Smith	11,205

=== Round 10 (Magic Weekend) ===
Home	Score	Away	Match information
Home	Score	Away	Date and time	Venue	Referee	Attendance
Leigh Leopards	26–24	Catalans Dragons	3 May 2025, 15:00	St James' Park	Liam Moore	31,294 (Day 1)
Hull KR	54–0	Salford Red Devils	3 May 2025, 17:15	St James' Park	Liam Rush	31,294 (Day 1)
St Helens	4–17	Leeds Rhinos	3 May 2025, 19:30	St James' Park	Jack Smith	31,294 (Day 1)
Huddersfield Giants	12–10	Hull FC	4 May 2025, 13:00	St James' Park	Aaron Moore	32,862 (Day 2)
Wigan Warriors	22–20	Warrington Wolves	4 May 2025, 15:15	St James' Park	Chris Kendall	32,862 (Day 2)
Castleford Tigers	8–32	Wakefield Trinity	4 May 2025, 17:30	St James' Park	Tom Grant	32,862 (Day 2)

=== Round 11 ===
Home	Score	Away	Match information
Home	Score	Away	Date and time	Venue	Referee	Attendance
St Helens	40–0	Catalans Dragons	15 May 2025, 20:00	Totally Wicked Stadium	Liam Moore	10,337
Leeds Rhinos	18–16	Hull FC	16 May 2025, 20:00	AMT Headingley Stadium	Jack Smith	15,602
Wigan Warriors	36–28	Leigh Leopards	16 May 2025, 20:00	Brick Community Stadium	Chris Kendall	17,449
Hull KR	34–0	Huddersfield Giants	17 May 2025, 17:30	Sewell Group Craven Park	Tom Grant	10,764
Wakefield Trinity	40–10	Warrington Wolves	18 May 2025, 15:00	DIY Kitchens Stadium	Liam Rush	6,629
Castleford Tigers	48–16	Salford Red Devils	18 May 2025, 17:30	The Mend-A-Hose Jungle	Marcus Griffiths	5,469

=== Round 12 ===
Home	Score	Away	Match information
Home	Score	Away	Date and time	Venue	Referee	Attendance
Leigh Leopards	12–26	Hull FC	22 May 2025, 20:00	Leigh Sports Village	Tom Grant	8,046
Huddersfield Giants	4–46	St Helens	23 May 2025, 20:00	John Smith's Stadium	Chris Kendall	4,029
Warrington Wolves	12–31	Hull KR	23 May 2025, 20:00	Halliwell Jones Stadium	Aaron Moore	9,972
Castleford Tigers	6–29	Leeds Rhinos	24 May 2025, 14:30	The Mend-A-Hose Jungle	Liam Rush	8,069
Catalans Dragons	0–48	Wigan Warriors	24 May 2025, 17:30	Stade Gilbert Brutus	Jack Smith	10,103
Wakefield Trinity	72–10	Salford Red Devils	25 May 2025, 15:00	DIY Kitchens Stadium	Liam Moore	6,277

=== Round 13 ===
Home	Score	Away	Match information
Home	Score	Away	Date and time	Venue	Referee	Attendance
Huddersfield Giants	24–28	Leigh Leopards	29 May 2025, 20:00	John Smith's Stadium	Jack Smith	3,458
Hull KR	34–4	St Helens	30 May 2025, 20:00	Sewell Group Craven Park	Liam Rush	11,087
Salford Red Devils	6–46	Wigan Warriors	30 May 2025, 20:00	Salford Community Stadium	Tom Grant	not given
Warrington Wolves	34–24	Castleford Tigers	30 May 2025, 20:00	Halliwell Jones Stadium	Marcus Griffiths	8,625
Leeds Rhinos	22–18	Wakefield Trinity	31 May 2025, 16:30	AMT Headingley Stadium	Chris Kendall	15,397
Catalans Dragons	0–34	Hull FC	31 May 2025, 17:30	Stade Gilbert Brutus	Liam Moore	8,237

=== Round 14 ===
Home	Score	Away	Match information
Home	Score	Away	Date and time	Venue	Referee	Attendance
Hull FC	14–22	Castleford Tigers	13 June 2025, 20:00	MKM Stadium	Liam Rush	13,376
Hull KR	68–6	Catalans Dragons	13 June 2025, 20:00	Sewell Group Craven Park	Tom Grant	11,350
Huddersfield Giants	18–22	Wigan Warriors	14 June 2025, 15:00	Flair Stadium (Note: Huddersfield's John Smith's Stadium was unavailable for this fixture, due to a Stereophonics concert, which took place on the same day.)	Liam Moore	4,182
Leeds Rhinos	36–12	Warrington Wolves	14 June 2025, 17:30	AMT Headingley Stadium	Chris Kendall	14,306
Wakefield Trinity	20–24	Leigh Leopards	15 June 2025, 14:30	DIY Kitchens Stadium	Jack Smith	7,147
Salford Red Devils	4–46	St Helens	15 June 2025, 15:00	Salford Community Stadium	Aaron Moore	Not given

=== Round 15 ===
Home	Score	Away	Match information
Home	Score	Away	Date and time	Venue	Referee	Attendance
Castleford Tigers	0–48	Hull KR	19 June 2025, 20:00	The Mend-A-Hose Jungle	Liam Moore	7,650
St Helens	18–4	Leeds Rhinos	20 June 2025, 20:00	Totally Wicked Stadium	Jack Smith	11,179
Wakefield Trinity	16–10	Wigan Warriors	20 June 2025, 20:00	DIY Kitchens Stadium	Aaron Moore	7,753
Warrington Wolves	16–24	Huddersfield Giants	21 June 2025, 15:00	Halliwell Jones Stadium	James Vella	9,964
Catalans Dragons	12–26	Leigh Leopards	21 June 2025, 17:30	Stade Gilbert Brutus	Liam Rush	9,134
Salford Red Devils	6–38	Hull FC	22 June 2025, 15:00	Salford Community Stadium	Tom Grant	Not given

=== Round 16 ===
Home	Score	Away	Match information
Home	Score	Away	Date and time	Venue	Referee	Attendance
Hull KR	34–10	Wakefield Trinity	27 June 2025, 20:00	Sewell Group Craven Park	Jack Smith	11,146
Leeds Rhinos	48–30	Leigh Leopards	27 June 2025, 20:00	AMT Headingley Stadium	Liam Moore	14,338
Catalans Dragons	32–0	Huddersfield Giants	28 June 2025, 17:30	Stade Gilbert Brutus	Cameron Worsley	8,233
Warrington Wolves	14–10	Hull FC	28 June 2025, 17:30	Halliwell Jones Stadium	Chris Kendall	10,203
Castleford Tigers	20–26	Wigan Warriors	28 June 2025, 20:00	The Mend-A-Hose Jungle	Tom Grant	6,052
St Helens	58–0	Salford Red Devils	29 June 2025, 15:00	Totally Wicked Stadium	Aaron Moore	10,192

=== Round 17 ===
Home	Score	Away	Match information
Home	Score	Away	Date and time	Venue	Referee	Attendance
Castleford Tigers	12–30	Huddersfield Giants	3 July 2025, 20:00	The Mend-A-Hose Jungle	James Vella	6,669
Leigh Leopards	18–8	Wigan Warriors	4 July 2025, 20:00	Leigh Sports Village	Jack Smith	10,375
Salford Red Devils	12–24	Warrington Wolves	4 July 2025, 20:00	Salford Community Stadium	Liam Rush	Not given
Hull FC	6–13	St Helens	5 July 2025, 15:00	MKM Stadium	Liam Moore	11,355
Wakefield Trinity	44–6	Catalans Dragons	5 July 2025, 17:30	DIY Kitchens Stadium	Tom Grant	8,625
Hull KR	8–14	Leeds Rhinos	6 July 2025, 15:00	Sewell Group Craven Park	Chris Kendall	11,300

=== Round 18 ===
Home	Score	Away	Match information
Home	Score	Away	Date and time	Venue	Referee	Attendance
Hull FC	16–10	Wakefield Trinity	10 July 2025, 20:00	MKM Stadium	James Vella	10,401
Leeds Rhinos	0–6	St Helens	11 July 2025, 20:00	AMT Headingley Stadium	Jack Smith	15,093
Wigan Warriors	30–10	Huddersfield Giants	11 July 2025, 20:00	Brick Community Stadium	Chris Kendall	15,175
Leigh Leopards	28–10	Hull KR	12 July 2025, 15:00	Leigh Sports Village	Liam Moore	9,682
Catalans Dragons	20–24	Warrington Wolves	12 July 2025, 18:00	Stade Gilbert Brutus	Liam Rush	6,548
Salford Red Devils	26–22	Castleford Tigers	13 July 2025, 15:00	Salford Community Stadium	Aaron Moore	2,051

=== Round 19 ===
Home	Score	Away	Match information
Home	Score	Away	Date and time	Venue	Referee	Attendance
St Helens	4–16	Leigh Leopards	17 July 2025, 20:00	Totally Wicked Stadium	Chris Kendall	11,085
Huddersfield Giants	10–46	Wakefield Trinity	18 July 2025, 20:00	Accu Stadium	Aaron Moore	5,145
Leeds Rhinos	42–6	Salford Red Devils	18 July 2025, 20:00	AMT Headingley Stadium	Liam Rush	11,843
Wigan Warriors	12–32	Hull FC	19 July 2025, 15:00	Brick Community Stadium	Liam Moore	14,427
Catalans Dragons	6–34	Hull KR	19 July 2025, 18:00	Stade Gilbert Brutus	Tom Grant	9,187
Castleford Tigers	20–14	Warrington Wolves	20 July 2025, 15:00	The Mend-A-Hose Jungle	Jack Smith	6,384

=== Round 20 ===
Home	Score	Away	Match information
Home	Score	Away	Date and time	Venue	Referee	Attendance
Wakefield Trinity	15–14	Leeds Rhinos	24 July 2025, 20:00	DIY Kitchens Stadium	Chris Kendall	9,252
Wigan Warriors	28–18	Catalans Dragons	25 July 2025, 20:00	Brick Community Stadium	Jack Smith	14,760
Hull FC	14–30	Huddersfield Giants	26 July 2025, 15:00	MKM Stadium	Tom Grant	10,665
Salford Red Devils	12–74	Hull KR	31 July 2025, 20:00	Salford Community Stadium	James Vella	Not given
Leigh Leopards	20–16	Warrington Wolves	1 August 2025, 20:00	Leigh Sports Village	Liam Moore	9,364
St Helens	40–0	Castleford Tigers	1 August 2025, 20:00	Totally Wicked Stadium	Aaron Moore	9,824

=== Round 21 ===
Home	Score	Away	Match information
Home	Score	Away	Date and time	Venue	Referee	Attendance
Leigh Leopards	14–22	Leeds Rhinos	7 August 2025, 20:00	Leigh Sports Village	Jack Smith	8,655
Wakefield Trinity	4–34	St Helens	8 August 2025, 20:00	DIY Kitchens Stadium	Liam Moore	7,684
Warrington Wolves	18–24	Wigan Warriors	8 August 2025, 20:00	Halliwell Jones Stadium	Chris Kendall	12,503
Hull KR	36–6	Castleford Tigers	9 August 2025, 15:00	Sewell Group Craven Park	Tom Grant	11,038
Huddersfield Giants	18–6	Catalans Dragons	9 August 2025, 17:30	Accu Stadium	Aaron Moore	3,245
Hull FC	80–6	Salford Red Devils	10 August 2025, 15:00	MKM Stadium	Liam Rush	11,242

=== Round 22 ===
Home	Score	Away	Match information
Home	Score	Away	Date and time	Venue	Referee	Attendance
Warrington Wolves	30–22	Catalans Dragons	14 August 2025, 20:00	Halliwell Jones Stadium	Tom Grant	10,870
Wigan Warriors	6–10	Hull KR	15 August 2025, 20:00	Brick Community Stadium	Liam Moore	20,218
Castleford Tigers	6–64	Leeds Rhinos	16 August 2025, 15:00	The Mend-A-Hose Jungle	Aaron Moore	7,861
Hull FC	18–12	Leigh Leopards	16 August 2025, 17:30	MKM Stadium	Chris Kendall	10,863
St Helens	52–4	Huddersfield Giants	17 August 2025, 14:30	Totally Wicked Stadium	Jack Smith	9,826
Salford Red Devils	0–48	Wakefield Trinity	N/A (Note: match forfeited by Salford on 15 August, due to "significant player welfare concerns". Under RFL operational rules, the game is recorded as a 48–0 victory for Wakefield, and converse loss for Salford, with the points scored/conceded applying to both teams.)	C–C

=== Round 23 ===
Home	Score	Away	Match information
Home	Score	Away	Date and time	Venue	Referee	Attendance
Leeds Rhinos	28–6	Hull KR	21 August 2025, 20:00	AMT Headingley Stadium	Jack Smith	16,260
Leigh Leopards	38–6	Salford Red Devils	22 August 2025, 20:00	Leigh Sports Village	Marcus Griffiths	7,826
St Helens	16–10	Hull FC	22 August 2025, 20:00	Totally Wicked Stadium	Liam Moore	12,005
Catalans Dragons	38–4	Castleford Tigers	23 August 2025, 18:00	Stade Gilbert Brutus	Liam Rush	7,269
Huddersfield Giants	23–10	Warrington Wolves	24 August 2025, 15:00	Accu Stadium	Aaron Moore	3,941
Wigan Warriors	44–2	Wakefield Trinity	24 August 2025, 15:00	Brick Community Stadium	Chris Kendall	13,932

=== Round 24 ===
Home	Score	Away	Match information
Home	Score	Away	Date and time	Venue	Referee	Attendance
Leigh Leopards	46–6	Castleford Tigers	28 August 2025, 20:00	Leigh Sports Village	Liam Moore	8,330
Hull KR	12–8	St Helens	29 August 2025, 20:00	Sewell Group Craven Park	Chris Kendall	12,169
Warrington Wolves	12–25	Salford Red Devils	29 August 2025, 20:00	Halliwell Jones Stadium	Scott Mikalauskas	Not given
Hull FC	0–34	Leeds Rhinos	30 August 2025, 15:00	MKM Stadium	Aaron Moore	12,020
Catalans Dragons	4–40	Wigan Warriors	30 August 2025, 20:00	Stade Gilbert Brutus	Tom Grant	10,150
Wakefield Trinity	48–2	Huddersfield Giants	31 August 2025, 15:00	DIY Kitchens Stadium	Jack Smith	7,112

=== Round 25 ===
Home	Score	Away	Match information
Home	Score	Away	Date and time	Venue	Referee	Attendance
Salford Red Devils	16–17	Catalans Dragons	4 September 2025, 20:00	Salford Community Stadium	Matthew Lynn	Not given
Huddersfield Giants	0–26	Leeds Rhinos	4 September 2025, 20:00	Accu Stadium	Tom Grant	4,315
Castleford Tigers	26–22	Wakefield Trinity	5 September 2025, 20:00	OneBore Stadium	Aaron Moore	7,532
St Helens	4–18	Wigan Warriors	5 September 2025, 20:00	Totally Wicked Stadium	Jack Smith	17,980
Warrington Wolves	12–34	Leigh Centurions	6 September 2025, 15:00	Halliwell Jones Stadium	Chris Kendall	11,060
Hull KR	18–4	Hull FC	7 September 2025, 15:00	Sewell Group Craven Park	Liam Moore	12,338

=== Round 26 ===
Home	Score	Away	Match information
Home	Score	Away	Date and time	Venue	Referee	Attendance
Leeds Rhinos	8–16	Catalans Dragons	11 September 2025, 20:00	AMT Headingley Stadium	Jack Smith	15,157
Leigh Leopards	28–10	St Helens	12 September 2025, 20:00	Leigh Sports Village	Liam Moore	10,011
Wigan Warriors	62–6	Castleford Tigers	12 September 2025, 20:00	Brick Community Stadium	Aaron Moore	15,224
Hull FC	34–2	Warrington Wolves	13 September 2025, 17:30	MKM Stadium	Tom Grant	10,494
Wakefield Trinity	28–12	Hull KR	13 September 2025, 17:30	DIY Kitchens Stadium	Chris Kendall	9,258
Huddersfield Giants	22–8	Salford Red Devils	14 September 2025, 15:00	Accu Stadium	Scott Mikalauskas	4,082

=== Round 27 ===
Home	Score	Away	Match information
Home	Score	Away	Date and time	Venue	Referee	Attendance
Hull FC	22–26	Catalans Dragons	18 September 2025, 20:00	MKM Stadium	Liam Moore	10,918
Hull KR	28–20	Warrington Wolves	18 September 2025, 20:00	Sewell Group Craven Park	Aaron Moore	11,769
Leigh Leopards	30–16	Huddersfield Giants	19 September 2025, 20:00	Leigh Sports Village	Marcus Griffiths	8,317
Salford Red Devils	16–52	Wakefield Trinity	19 September 2025, 20:00	Salford Community Stadium	Jack Smith	4,148
St Helens	26–24	Castleford Tigers	19 September 2025, 20:00	Totally Wicked Stadium	Liam Rush	10,058
Wigan Warriors	22–6	Leeds Rhinos	19 September 2025, 20:00	Brick Community Stadium	Chris Kendall	16,628

== Play-offs ==
=== Summary ===
Home	Score	Away	Match Information
Home	Score	Away	Date and time	Venue	Referee	Attendance
Eliminators
Leigh Leopards	26–10	Wakefield Trinity	26 September 2025, 20:00	Leigh Sports Village	Liam Moore	10,011
Leeds Rhinos	14–16	St Helens	27 September 2025, 20:00	AMT Headingley Stadium	Jack Smith
Semi-finals
Wigan Warriors	18–6	Leigh Leopards	3 October 2025, 20:00	Brick Community Stadium	Chris Kendall	18,523
Hull KR	20–12	St Helens	4 October 2025, 17:30	Sewell Group Craven Park	Liam Moore	12,000
Grand Final
Hull KR	–	Wigan Warriors	11 October 2025, 18:00	Old Trafford	Liam Moore	68,853
