= Josh Eaves =

English rugby league footballer

Personal information
- Full name: Joshua Eaves
- Born: 20 October 1997 (age 28) England
- Height: 5 ft 9 in (1.75 m)
- Weight: 12 st 13 lb (82 kg)

Playing information
- Position: Hooker
Club
Years	Team	Pld	T	G	FG	P
2018–21	St Helens	4	1	0	0	4
2018(loan)	→ Whitehaven RLFC	23	8	0	0	32
2019(loan)	→ Leigh Centurions	8	4	0	0	16
2021(loan)	→ Leigh Centurions	1	0	0	0	0
2021(loan)	→ Wakefield Trinity	3	0	0	0	0
2021(loan)	→ Leigh Centurions	4	0	0	0	0
2022	Newcastle Thunder	29	8	0	0	32
2023–24	Swinton Lions	46	10	0	0	40
2025–26	North Wales Crusaders	31	9	0	0	36
2026–	Swinton Lions	14	7	0	0	28
	Total	163	47	0	0	188
- Source: As of 23 August 2026

Josh Eaves (born 20 October 1997) is a professional rugby league footballer who plays as a hooker for Swinton Lions in the RFL Championship.

He has spent time on loan from Saints at Whitehaven in Betfed League 1, and the Leigh Centurions in the Betfred Championship and the Super League.

== Career ==
Eaves made his Super League début for Saints against the London Broncos in July 2019.

=== Leigh Centurions ===
On 17 March 2021, he joined Leigh in the Super League on loan.

=== Wakefield Trinity (loan) ===
On 28 April 2021, he signed for Wakefield Trinity in the Super League on a short 2-week loan.

=== Leigh Centurions (loan) ===
On 4 August 2021, he signed for Leigh in the Super League on loan.

=== Newcastle Thunder ===
On 1 November 2021 hesigned for Newcastle Thunder in the RFL Championship.

=== Whitehaven ===
In September 2022 it was reported that Eaves had signed for Whitehaven.

=== North Wales Crusaders ===
On 13 January 2025 he signed for North Wales Crusaders in the RFL League 1.

=== Swinton Lions (re-join) ===
On 22 April 2026 he joined Swinton Lions in the RFL Championship
