= Aaron Smith (rugby league, born 1996) =

English rugby league footballer

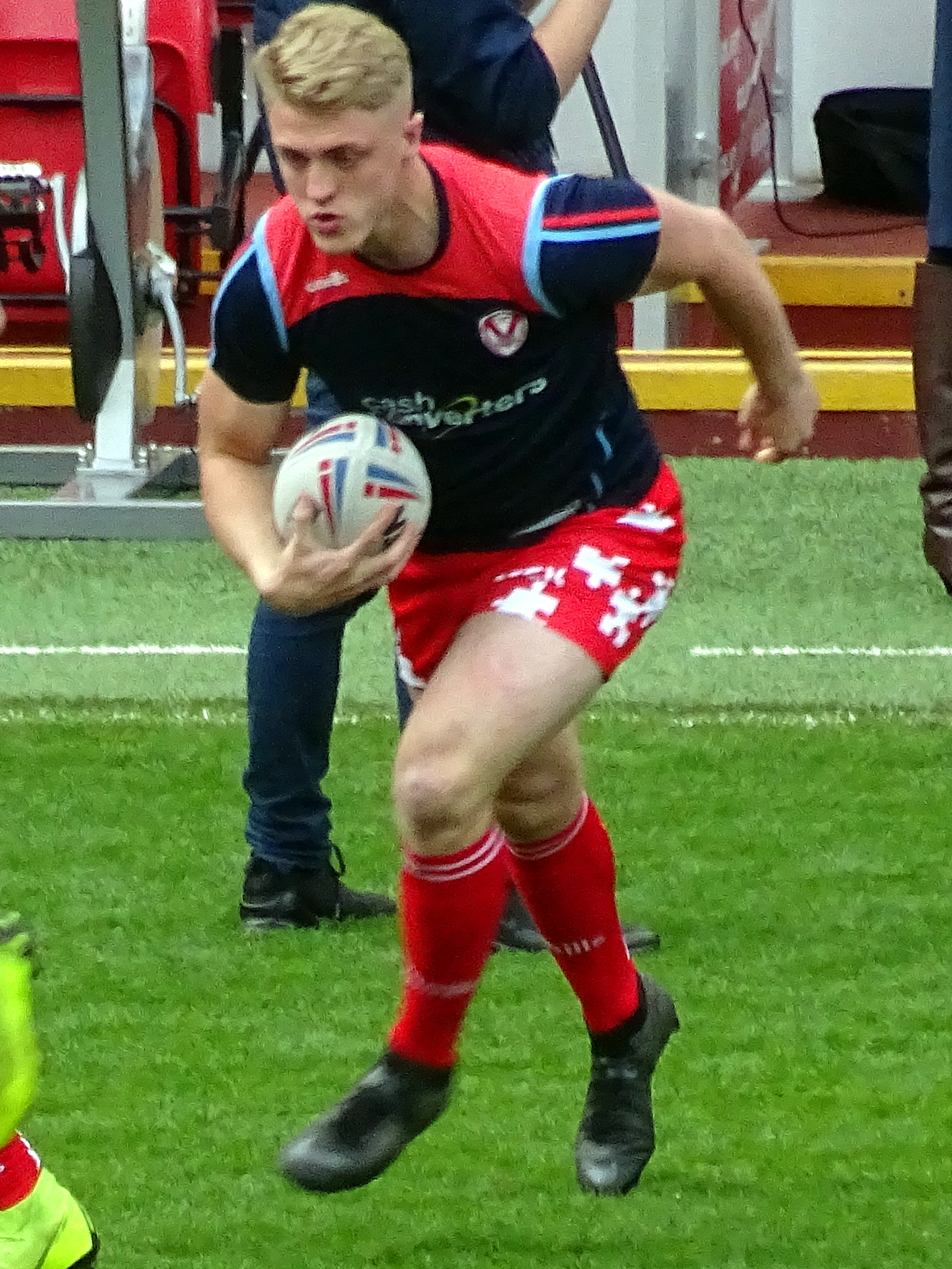

Personal information
- Born: 12 October 1996 (age 30) Newton-le-Willows, Merseyside, England
- Height: 5 ft 11 in (1.81 m)
- Weight: 13 st 5 lb (85 kg)

Playing information
- Position: Hooker
Club
Years	Team	Pld	T	G	FG	P
2018–22	St Helens	35	9	0	0	36
2018(loan)	→York City Knights	3	4	0	0	16
2018(loan)	→Hull Kingston Rovers	4	0	0	0	0
2018(loan)	→Featherstone Rovers	2	1	0	0	4
2019(DR)	→Leigh Centurions	5	1	0	0	4
2022(loan)	→Leigh Centurions	32	10	0	0	40
2023	Leigh Leopards	2	0	0	0	0
2023(loan)	→Rochdale Hornets	6	2	0	0	8
2024–25	Barrow Raiders	34	5	0	0	20
	Total	123	32	0	0	128
Representative
Years	Team	Pld	T	G	FG	P
2021	England Knights	16	2	0	0	4
- Source: As of 25 October 2026

Aaron Smith (born 12 October 1996) is a semi-professional rugby league footballer who last played as a hooker for Barrow Raiders in the RFL Championship.

He has spent time on loan from St Helens at the York City Knights in Betfred League 1, Hull Kingston Rovers in the Super League, and Featherstone Rovers and the Leigh Centurions in the Betfred Championship.

== Background ==
Smith was born in Newton-le-Willows, Merseyside, England.

== Career ==
In 2018 he made his Super League début on loan for Hull Kingston Rovers against Wakefield Trinity. In 2018 he has spent time on loan at Featherstone Rovers. He played in the 2019 Super League Grand Final victory over the Salford Red Devils at Old Trafford.

=== Leigh Centurions (loan) ===
On 22 October 2021, it was reported that he had re-joined Leigh in the RFL Championship on a season-long loan.

=== Barrow Raiders ===
On 23 Jan 2024 it was reported that he had signed for Barrow Raiders in the RFL Championship on a 2-year deal.

On 1 November 2025 it was reported that he had left Barrow Raiders
