= Matty Costello =

English semi-professional rugby league footballer

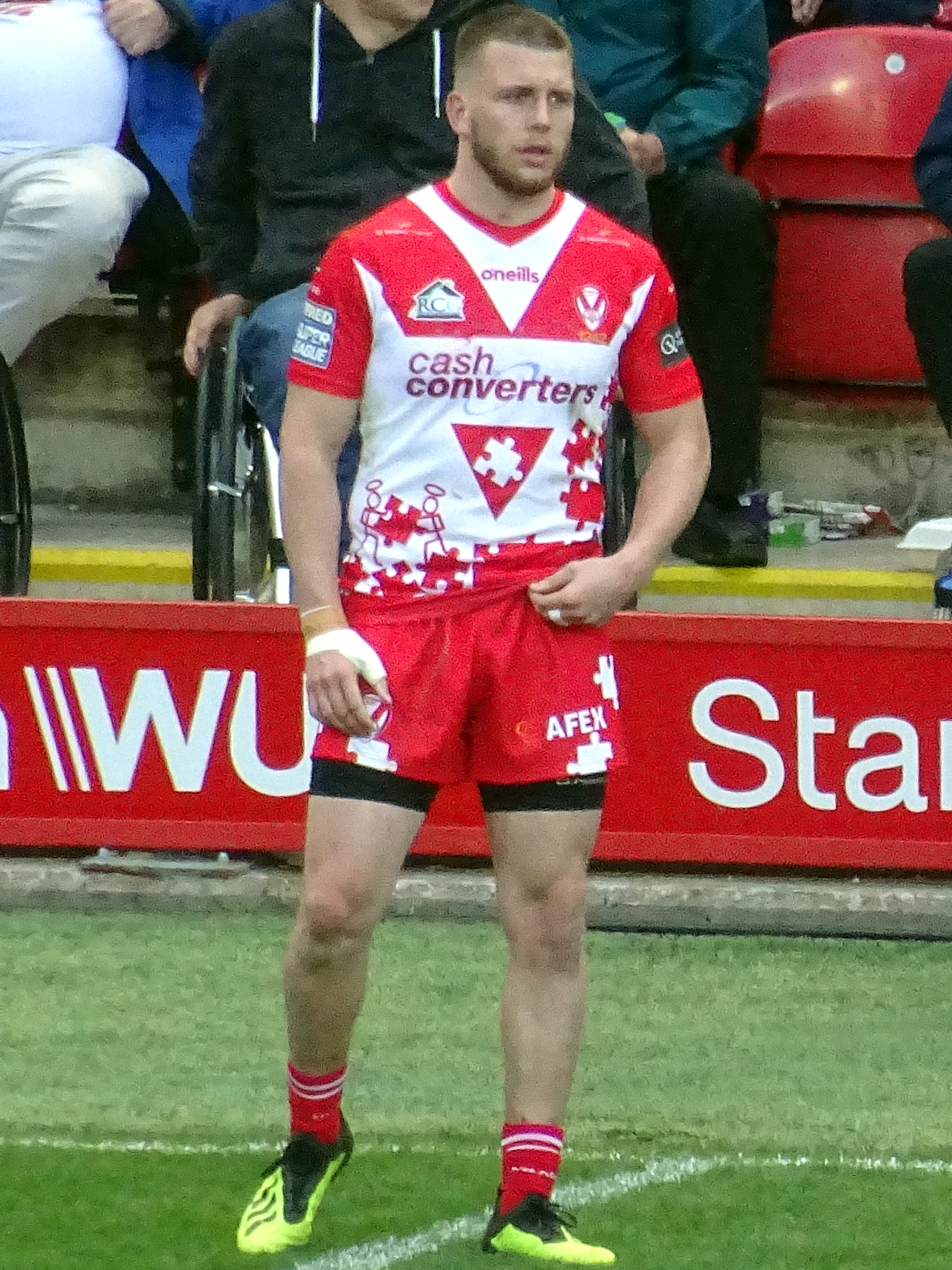

Personal information
- Full name: Matthew Costello
- Born: 9 April 1998 (age 28) Billinge Higher End, Greater Manchester, England
- Height: 5 ft 11 in (1.80 m)
- Weight: 14 st 9 lb (93 kg)

Playing information
- Position: Centre, Wing
Club
Years	Team	Pld	T	G	FG	P
2018–20	St Helens	26	6	0	0	16
2018(loan)	→ Sheffield Eagles	17	9	0	0	36
2019(DR)	→ Leigh Centurions	9	5	0	0	16
2021–23	Salford Red Devils	24	12	0	0	16
2022(loan)	→ Newcastle Thunder	1	0	0	0	0
2022(loan)	→ Barrow Raiders	6	4	0	0	16
2024–	Barrow Raiders	27	9	0	0	36
	Total	110	45	0	0	136
- Source: As of 5 December 2024

Matty Costello (born 9 April 1998) is a semi-professional rugby league footballer who plays as a centre for the Barrow Raiders in the RFL Championship.

He has previously played for St Helens and Salford Red Devils in the Super League, and has spent time on loan at Sheffield Eagles, Leigh Centurions, Newcastle Thunder and Barrow Raiders in the Betfred Championship.

== Background ==
Costello was born in Billinge Higher End, Greater Manchester.

== Career ==
=== St Helens ===
In 2018, he made his Super League début for St Helens against the Huddersfield Giants.

Costello graduated into the first team squad by the 2018 season. He played at the Orrell St James ARLFC from an early age before starting a scholarship with the Saints in 2014. He played his first senior matches for the Sheffield Eagles club.

In 2018 he spent time on loan at the Sheffield Eagles, where he went on to pick up the 2018 Championship Young Player of the Year award after an impressive season with the Sheffield club. In seasons 2019 and 2020, Costello was a squad player for St Helens as the club went on to win back to back Super League Grand finals.

=== Salford Red Devils ===
On 9 December 2020, it was announced that Costello would join Salford for the 2021 season on a three-year deal

=== Barrow Raiders ===
On 26 September 2023, it was announced that Costello would drop out of professional rugby to join Barrow for the 2024 season on a one-year deal.
