= Ben Davies (rugby league, born 2000) =

English rugby league footballer

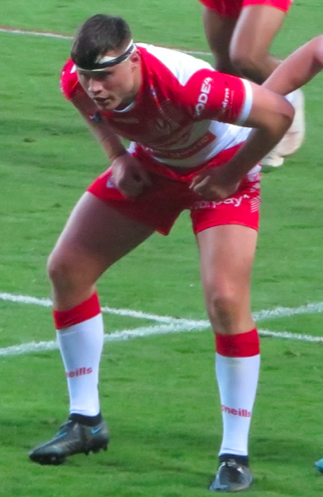

Personal information
- Full name: Benjamin Davies
- Born: 21 April 2000 (age 26) Widnes, Cheshire, England
- Height: 6 ft 0 in (1.82 m)
- Weight: 15 st 6 lb (98 kg)

Playing information
- Position: Centre, Stand-off
Club
Years	Team	Pld	T	G	FG	P
2019–20	Widnes Vikings	1	0	0	0	0
2020–25	St Helens	41	11	1	0	46
2021(loan)	→ Salford Red Devils	3	1	0	0	4
2023(DR)	→ Swinton Lions	4	0	7	0	14
2025(loan)	→ Castleford Tigers	1	0	0	0	0
2025–	Oldham	13	5	1	0	22
	Total	63	17	9	0	86
- Source: As of 11 June 2026
- Relatives: Jake Davies (brother)

Ben Davies (born 21 April 2000) is an English professional rugby league footballer who plays as a centre or stand-off for Oldham in the RFL Championship.

== Background ==
Davies was born in Widnes, Cheshire, England.

Davies played junior rugby league for Halton Farnworth Hornets before switching to Widnes Moorfield. He then joined the Widnes Vikings Academy.

Davies represented Lancashire in their Academy Origin programme fixture against the Australian Schoolboys on 1 December 2018. He was also part of the England U18's Academy squad.

== Career ==
=== Widnes Vikings ===
He made his professional début for Widnes in the Championship in 2019.

=== St Helens ===
Davies made his first team début for St Helens as a centre against the Salford Red Devils on 26 Oct 2020. Due to end-of-season fixture congestion caused by the COVID-19 pandemic, Saints fielded a very young side, resting the majority of first team players, in preparation of their derby match against the Wigan Warriors four days later. In round 23 of the 2022 Super League season, Davies scored two tries in St Helens 60-6 victory over Hull F.C.

==== Salford Red Devils (loan) ====
On 8 June 2021 it was reported that he had signed for Salford in the Super League on loan.

==== Castleford Tigers (loan) ====
On 11 February 2025, it was announced that Davies would join Castleford Tigers ahead of the 2025 season on an initial two-week loan. The loan ended on 19 February 2025, after he played just one game for Castleford.

=== Oldham RLFC ===
On 2 May 2025 it was reported that he had signed for Oldham RLFC in the RFL Championship
