= Liam Cooper (rugby league) =

English Rugby League player

Personal information
- Full name: Liam Cooper
- Born: 5 October 1996 (age 29) England,
- Height: 6 ft 0 in (1.82 m)
- Weight: 13 st 12 lb (88 kg)

Playing information
- Position: Second-row
Club
Years	Team	Pld	T	G	FG	P
2017–19	St Helens	0	0	0	0	0
2017(DR)	→ Sheffield Eagles	2	0	0	0	0
2018(loan)	→ Whitehaven	18	4	0	0	16
2018(loan)	→ Halifax	5	0	0	0	0
2019(loan)	→ Halifax	22	3	0	0	12
2020	Widnes Vikings	0	0	0	0	0
2021–22	Whitehaven	45	6	0	0	24
2023–24	Swinton Lions	27	0	0	0	0
2024(loan)	→North Wales Crusaders	2	1	0	0	4
2025	North Wales Crusaders	13	0	0	0	0
2026–	Salford	0	0	0	0	0
	Total	134	14	0	0	56
- Source: As of 24 April 2026

Liam "Ronnie" Cooper (born 5 October 1996) is a professional rugby league footballer who plays as a second-row forward for Salford in the RFL Championship.

== Playing career ==
=== St Helens ===
He was contracted to St Helens in the Super League, and spent time on loan from the Saints at the Sheffield Eagles and Halifax in the Championship and Whitehaven in League 1.

=== Widnes Vikings ===
On 19 August 2020 it was announced that Cooper would be leaving Widnes at the end of the 2020 season.

=== Whitehaven R.L.F.C. ===
On 5 Sep 2020 it was reported that he had signed for Whitehaven R.L.F.C. in the RFL Championship.

=== Swinton Lions ===
On 1 November 2022 it was announced that Cooper had signed for the Swinton Lions.

=== North Wales Crusaders ===
On 11 December 2024 it was reported that he had signed for North Wales Crusaders in the RFL League 1.

=== Salford RLFC ===
On 14 January 2026 it was reported that he had signed for Salford RLFC in the RFL Championship
