= Sam Wood (rugby league, born 1997) =

England international rugby league footballer

Personal information
- Full name: Samuel Wood
- Born: 11 July 1997 (age 29) Dewsbury, West Yorkshire, England
- Height: 6 ft 4 in (1.94 m)
- Weight: 16 st 5 lb (104 kg)

Playing information
- Position: Centre
Club
Years	Team	Pld	T	G	FG	P
2016–21	Huddersfield Giants	52	16	4	0	72
2016(DR)	→ Oldham	5	2	3	0	14
2017(DR)	→ Oldham	8	3	0	0	12
2018(DR)	→ Workington Town	2	0	1	0	2
2018(loan)	→ Halifax	2	1	0	0	4
2019(loan)	→ Batley Bulldogs	26	6	3	0	30
2021(loan)	→ Dewsbury Rams	1	1	0	0	4
2022–23	Hull Kingston Rovers	33	9	4	0	44
2024–25	Castleford Tigers	40	8	0	0	32
2026–	York Knights	21	7	0	0	28
	Total	190	53	15	0	242
Representative
Years	Team	Pld	T	G	FG	P
2024	England	1	0	0	0	0
- Source: As of 31 August 2026

Sam Wood (born 11 July 1997) is an English professional rugby league footballer who plays as a centre for the York Knights in the Super League and England at international level.

He has previously played for Huddersfield Giants, Hull Kingston Rovers, and Castleford Tigers in the Super League. He has spent time on loan or dual registration at Oldham, Halifax, Batley Bulldogs, and Dewsbury Rams in the RFL Championship, and at Workington Town in RFL League 1.

== Background ==
Wood was born in Dewsbury, West Yorkshire, England.

He is a product of the Huddersfield Giants academy system.

== Playing career ==
=== Huddersfield Giants ===
On 12 February 2016, Wood made his Super League debut for Huddersfield against the Wigan Warriors. He played in a wide range of positions throughout his time with the Giants, including centre, wing, halfback, second row, and loose forward.

==== Dewsbury Rams (loan) ====
On 26 May 2021, it was reported that he had signed for the Dewsbury Rams in the RFL Championship on loan.

=== Hull Kingston Rovers ===
On 14 November 2021, it was announced that Wood had signed for Hull Kingston Rovers in the Super League.

=== Castleford Tigers ===
On 4 October 2023, the Castleford Tigers announced the signing of Wood on a three-year deal. He stated his intention to "put my imprint on the club and fight for that starting shirt," and added, "I leave everything on the field for the fans and I'll try my very best every week."

Wood was assigned squad number 4 ahead of the 2024 season. He made his Castleford debut in round 1 against the Wigan Warriors, and scored his first try in round 2 against the Salford Red Devils.

In December 2024, Wood was appointed as Castleford club captain by new head coach Danny McGuire. He scored his first try of the 2025 season against Wakefield in round 8, and scored a second at Magic Weekend two weeks later.

=== York Knights ===
On 13 October 2025, it was announced that he had joined York Knights for 2026.

=== International ===
He made his England début on 29 June 2024 v France in Toulouse.

== Statistics ==
Appearances and points in all competitions by year
Club	Season	Tier	App	T	G	DG	Pts
Huddersfield Giants	2016	Super League	5	0	0	0	0
Huddersfield Giants	2017	Super League	9	6	0	0	24
Huddersfield Giants	2018	Super League	6	1	4	0	12
Huddersfield Giants	2020	Super League	16	2	0	0	8
Huddersfield Giants	2021	Super League	16	7	0	0	28
Huddersfield Giants	Total		52	16	4	0	72
→ Oldham (DR)	2016	Championship	5	2	3	0	14
→ Oldham (DR)	2017	Championship	8	3	0	0	12
→ Oldham (DR)	Total		13	5	3	0	26
→ Workington Town (DR)	2018	League 1	2	0	1	0	2
→ Halifax (loan)	2018	Championship	2	1	0	0	4
→ Batley Bulldogs (loan)	2019	Championship	26	6	3	0	30
→ Dewsbury Rams (loan)	2021	Championship	1	1	0	0	4
Hull Kingston Rovers	2022	Super League	22	6	2	0	28
Hull Kingston Rovers	2023	Super League	11	3	2	0	16
Hull Kingston Rovers	Total		33	9	4	0	44
Castleford Tigers	2024	Super League	16	3	0	0	12
Castleford Tigers	2025	Super League	17	3	0	0	12
Castleford Tigers	Total		33	6	0	0	24
York Knights	2026	Super League	0	0	0	0	0
Career total			162	44	15	0	206

As of match played 13 July 2025
