= 2024 Halifax Panthers season =

- Championship Rank: 9th
- Challenge Cup: 6th Round
- 2024 record: Wins: 15; draws: 0; losses: 17
- Points scored: For: 509; against: 650

Team information
- Head Coach: Liam Finn
- Captain: Adam O'Brien
- Stadium: The Shay
← 2023	2025 →

This article details the Halifax Panthers rugby league football club's 2024 season. This is the Panthers' sixteenth consecutive season in the Championship.

== Pre-season friendlies ==
LEGEND
Win
Draw
Loss

Date	Competition	Vrs	H/A	Venue	Result	Score	Tries	Goals	Att	Report
24 December 2023	Pre Season	Bradford Bulls	A	Odsal Stadium	L	24-16				
21 January 2024	Pre Season	Keighley Cougars	A	Cougar Park	W	16-6				

== RFL Championship ==
=== Matches ===
LEGEND
Win
Draw
Loss
Postponed

Date	Competition	Rnd	Vrs	H/A	Venue	Result	Score	Tries	Goals	Att	Live on TV	Report
17 March 2024	Championship	1	Dewsbury Rams	A	Flair Stadium	W	10-24	Jouffret (2), Keyes, Woodburn-Hall	Jouffret 3/3, Widdop 1/1	-	-	Report
29 March 2024	Championship	2	Bradford Bulls	A	Odsal Stadium	L	29-10	Woodburn-Hall, Gee	Jouffret 1/2	-	-	Report
7 April 2024	Championship	3	Batley Bulldogs	H	Shay Stadium	W	18-10	Inman, Woodburn-Hall	Jouffret 5/6	-	-	Report
14 April 2024	Championship	4	Widnes Vikings	A	DCBL Stadium	L	40-14	Widdop, Jouffret, Kavanagh	Jouffret 1/3	-	-	Report
21 April 2024	Championship	5	Sheffield Eagles	H	Shay Stadium	L	0-46	-	-	-	-	Report
28 April 2024	Championship	6	Swinton Lions	H	Shay Stadium	L	12-28	Jouffret, Eden	Jouffret 2/2	-	-	Report
5 May 2024	Championship	7	Featherstone Rovers	A	Millennium Stadium	L	36-16	Eden, Widdop, Keyes	Jouffret 2/3	-	-	Report
19 May 2024	Championship	8	York Knights	A	LNER Community Stadium	L	40-18	Tangata, Barber, McComb	Widdop 3/3	-	-	Report
26 May 2024	Championship	9	Doncaster RLFC	H	Shay Stadium	W	34-8	Keyes (2), Widdop, McCormack, Larroyer	Jouffret 7/7	-	-	Report
1 June 2024	Championship	10	Toulouse Olympique	H	Shay Stadium	L	24-38	Gee, Barber (2), Saltonstall	Jouffret 4/4	-	-	Report
15 June 2024	Championship	11	Barrow Raiders	A	Northern Competitions Stadium	W	38-28	Tibbs, Keyes (2), Saltonstall, Woodburn-Hall, McComb	Jouffret 2/2, Keyes 1/2, Widdop 3/3	-	-	Report
23 June 2024	Championship	12	Wakefield Trinity	A	DIY Kitchens Stadium	L	46-24	Graham, Widdop, Woodburn-Hall, Gee	Jouffret 4/4	-	-	Report
30 June 2024	Championship	13	Whitehaven R.L.F.C.	H	Shay Stadium	W	38-18	Keyes, Tibbs, Graham (2), Gee, Jouffret, Barber	Jouffret 5/7	-	-	Report
5 July 2024	Championship	14	Sheffield Eagles	A	Olympic Legacy Park	L	28-0	-	-	-	-	Report
14 July 2024	Championship	15	Featherstone Rovers	H	Shay Stadium	L	6-14	Kavanagh	Jouffret 1/1	-	-	Report
21 July 2024	Championship	16	Widnes Vikings	H	Shay Stadium	L	20-24	Woodburn-Hall, Crooks, Jouffret, Saltonstall	Jouffret 2/4	-	-	Report
28 July 2024	Championship	17	Batley Bulldogs	A	Fox's Biscuits Stadium	W	16-22	Barber (2), Graham, Keyes	Jouffret 3/4	-	-	Report
4 August 2024	Championship	18	York Knights	H	Shay Stadium	W	38-18	Woodburn-Hall, Crooks, Graham (2), Jouffret (2), Keyes	Jouffret 4/5, Keyes 1/2	-	-	Report
11 August 2024	Championship	19	Barrow Raiders	H	Shay Stadium	W	38-12	Tibbs (2), Saltonstall, Woodburn-Hall, Keyes, Kavanagh, Graham	Jouffret 5/7	-	-	Report
18 August 2024	Championship	20	Swinton Lions	A	Heywood Road	L	20-6	Widdop	Jouffret 1/1	-	-	Report
25 August 2024	Championship	21	Wakefield Trinity	H	Shay Stadium	L	6-48	Graham	Jouffret 1/1	-	-	Report
1 September 2024	Championship	22	Doncaster RLFC	A	Eco-Power Stadium	W	16-17	Graham, Barber, Keyes	Jouffret 2/3, Woodburn-Hall (DG)	-	-	Report
8 September 2024	Championship	23	Dewsbury Rams	H	Shay Stadium	W	34-6	Barber, Woodburn-Hall, Widdop (2), Tibbs (2)	Jouffret 5/6	-	-	Report
14 September 2024	Championship	24	Toulouse Olympique	A	LEL Arena	L	38-18	Graham, Hursey (2), Tibbs	Jouffret 1/4	-	-	Report
22 September 2024	Championship	25	Bradford Bulls	H	Shay Stadium	W	14-10	Fairbank, Saltonstall	Jouffret 3/4	-	-	Report
29 September 2024	Championship	26	Whitehaven R.L.F.C.	A	LEL Arena	L	23-20	Woodburn-Hall (3), Graham	Jouffret 2/4	-	-	Report

== Challenge Cup ==
LEGEND
Win
Draw
Loss

Date	Competition	Rnd	Vrs	H/A	Venue	Result	Score	Tries	Goals	Att	TV	Report
11 February 2024	Challenge Cup	3rd	Whitehaven R.L.F.C.	H	Shay Stadium	W	32-4	Keyes (2), Jouffret Crooks (2), Saltonstall	Jouffret 4/6	-	-	Report
24 February 2024	Challenge Cup	4th	Hammersmith Hills Hoists	H	Shay Stadium	W	50-4	Tibbs, Crooks, Saltonstall (2), Jouffret (2), O'Brien, Inman, Lannon	Jouffret 7/9	-	-	Report
10 March 2024	Challenge Cup	5th	York Acorn	H	Shay Stadium	W	62-6	Gee (3), Tibbs, Kavanagh, Keyes (2), Lannon, Jouffret, McComb (2)	Jouffret 9/11	-	-	Report
10 March 2024	Challenge Cup	6th	Catalans Dragons	H	Shay Stadium	L	4-40	Saltonstall	Jouffret 0/1	-	-	Report

== 1895 Cup ==
LEGEND
Win
Draw
Loss

Date	Competition	Rnd	Vrs	H/A	Venue	Result	Score	Tries	Goals	Att	TV	Report
28 January 2024	1895 Cup	Round 1	Oldham RLFC	A	Boundary Park	L	24-20	Eden (2), Woodburn-Hall, Tibbs	Keyes 0/2, Jouffret 2/2	-	-	Report
4 February 2024	1895 Cup	Round 2	Rochdale Hornets	A	Crown Oil Arena	W	12-52	Woodburn-Hall, Crooks (2), Eden, Tibbs, Kavanagh, Inman, Gee, Jouffret	Jouffret 8/9	-	-	Report

Group 4
Pos	Team	Pld	W	D	L	PF	PA	PD	Pts	Qualification
1	Oldham	2	2	0	0	62	32	+30	4	Advance to knock-out stages
2	Halifax Panthers	2	1	0	1	72	36	+36	2	
3	Rochdale Hornets	2	0	0	2	24	90	−66	0	

== Squad statistics ==
- Appearances and points include (Championship, Challenge Cup and 1895 Cup) as of 01 October 2024.

No	Player	Position	Age	Previous club	Apps	Tries	Goals	DG	Points
1	James Woodburn-Hall	Fullback	27	London Skolars	0	0	0	0	0
2	Greg Eden	Wing	24	Castleford Tigers	0	0	0	0	0
3	Zack McComb	Centre	27	Sheffield Eagles	0	0	0	0	0
4	Ben Crooks	Centre	22	Keighley Cougars	0	0	0	0	0
5	James Saltonstall	Wing	29	Warrington Wolves	0	0	0	0	0
6	Louis Jouffret	Scrum half	26	Whitehaven R.L.F.C.	0	0	0	0	0
7	Joe Keyes	Scrum half	25	Hull Kingston Rovers	0	0	0	0	0
8	Adam Tangata	Prop	30	Wakefield Trinity	0	0	0	0	0
9	Adam O'Brien	Hooker	23	Huddersfield Giants	0	0	0	0	0
10	Dan Murray	Prop	32	Toronto Wolfpack	0	0	0	0	0
11	Ben Kavanagh	Second row	33	Huddersfield Giants	0	0	0	0	0
12	Matty Gee	Second row	31	Leigh Centurions	0	0	0	0	0
13	Jacob Fairbank	Prop	29	Toulouse Olympique	0	0	0	0	0
14	Brandon Moore	Hooker	28	Castleford Tigers	0	0	0	0	0
15	Ryan Lannon	Prop	28	Salford Red Devils	0	0	0	0	0
16	William Calcott	Prop	26	Bradford Bulls Academy	0	0	0	0	0
17	Ben Tibbs	Centre	23	Huddersfield Giants	0	0	0	0	0
18	Brandon Douglas	Prop	27	Sheffield Eagles	0	0	0	0	0
19	Connor Davies	Hooker	27	Dewsbury Rams	0	0	0	0	0
20	Tom Inman	Hooker	21	York Knights	0	0	0	0	0
21	Olly Davies	Second-Row	27	Widnes Vikings	0	0	0	0	0
24	Cole Oakley	Centre	22	Warrington Wolves	0	0	0	0	0
25	Ben Forster	Prop	21	Rochdale Hornets	0	0	0	0	0
31	Kevin Larroyer	Second-row	33	Leigh Centurions	0	0	0	0	0

== Transfers ==
=== In ===
	Name	Position	Signed from	Date
-	-	-	-	-

=== Out ===
	Name	Position	Club Signed	Date
-	-	-	-	-
