= 2023 Halifax Panthers season =

- Championship Rank: 5th
- Challenge Cup: 3rd Round
- 2023 record: Wins: 7; draws: 0; losses: 4
- Points scored: For: 192; against: 198

Team information
- Head Coach: Simon Grix
- Captain: Brandon Moore
- Stadium: The Shay
← 2022	2024 →

This article details the Halifax Panthers rugby league football club's 2023 season. This is the Panthers' fifteenth consecutive season in the Championship.

== Pre-season friendlies ==
LEGEND
Win
Draw
Loss

Date	Competition	Vrs	H/A	Venue	Result	Score	Tries	Goals	Att	Report
15 January 2023	Pre Season	Wakefield Trinity	A	The Be Well Support Stadium	L	0-0				
22 January 2023	Pre Season	Hunslet R.L.F.C.	A	South Leeds Stadium	Postponed	0-0				

== RFL Championship ==
=== Matches ===
LEGEND
Win
Draw
Loss
Postponed

Date	Competition	Rnd	Vrs	H/A	Venue	Result	Score	Tries	Goals	Att	Live on TV	Report
5 February 2023	Championship	1	Sheffield Eagles	H	Shay Stadium	W	26-18	Saltonstall, Walmsley, Maizen (2)	Keyes 5/6	2,107	-	Report
12 February 2023	Championship	2	Featherstone Rovers	A	Post Office Road	L	46-22	Walmsley (2), Woodburn-Hall (2)	Keyes 3/4	3,974	-	Report
19 February 2023	Championship	3	London Broncos	H	Shay Stadium	W	26-18	Jouffret, Saltonstall (2), Walmsley, Doro	Keyes 3/6	1,950	-	Report
27 February 2023	Championship	4	Widnes Vikings	A	DCBL Stadium	L	42-14	Walmsley (2), Gee	Jouffret 1/3	3,187	Viaplay	Report
5 March 2023	Championship	5	Batley Bulldogs	H	Shay Stadium	W	20-16	-	-	1,703	-	
19 March 2023	Championship	6	Keighley Cougars	H	Shay Stadium	W	34-10	Saltonstall, Keyes, Kavanagh, Walmsley (2), Inman	Keyes 5/6	2,123	-	Report
26 March 2023	Championship	7	Barrow Raiders	A	The Matt Johnson Prestige Stadium	L	16-12	Jouffret, Pickersgill	Keyes 2/3	1,879	-	Report
10 April 2023	Championship	8	Bradford Bulls	H	Shay Stadium	L	22-26	Moore, Walmsley, Maizen (2)	Keyes 3/4	3,053	Viaplay	Report
16 April 2023	Championship	9	York Knights	H	Shay Stadium	W	16-6	Walmsley (2), Fairbank	Keyes 1/2, Jouffret 1/1	1,454	-	Report
7 May 2023	Championship	10	Newcastle Thunder	A	Kingston Park	W	16-36	Keyes (2), Walmsley, Woodburn-Hall, McComb, Inman	Keyes 6/7	Attendance	-	Report
14 May 2023	Championship	11	Whitehaven R.L.F.C.	H	Shay Stadium	W/D/L	0-0	-	-	Attendance	-	
28 May 2023	Championship Summer Bash	12	Batley Bulldogs	N	LNER Community Stadium	W/D/L	0-0	-	-	Attendance	-	
3 June 2023	Championship	13	Toulouse Olympique	A	Stade Ernest-Wallon	W/D/L	0-0	-	-	Attendance	-	
11 June 2023	Championship	14	Swinton Lions	A	Heywood Road	W/D/L	0-0	-	-	Attendance	-	
18 June 2023	Championship	15	Bradford Bulls	A	Odsal Stadium	W/D/L	0-0	-	-	Attendance	-	
25 June 2023	Championship	16	Barrow Raiders	H	Shay Stadium	W/D/L	0-0	-	-	Attendance	-	
2 July 2023	Championship	17	York Knights	A	LNER Community Stadium	W/D/L	0-0	-	-	Attendance	-	
9 July 2023	Championship	18	Batley Bulldogs	A	Fox's Biscuits Stadium	W/D/L	0-0	-	-	Attendance	-	
16 July 2023	Championship	19	Newcastle Thunder	H	Shay Stadium	W/D/L	0-0	-	-	Attendance	-	
28 July 2023	Championship	20	Sheffield Eagles	A	Olympic Legacy Park	W/D/L	0-0	-	-	Attendance	-	
6 August 2023	Championship	21	Featherstone Rovers	H	Shay Stadium	W/D/L	0-0	-	-	Attendance	-	
20 August 2023	Championship	22	London Broncos	A	Cherry Red Records Stadium	W/D/L	0-0	-	-	Attendance	-	
27 August 2023	Championship	23	Widnes Vikings	H	Shay Stadium	W/D/L	0-0	-	-	Attendance	-	
3 September 2023	Championship	24	Whitehaven R.L.F.C.	A	LEL Arena	W/D/L	0-0	-	-	Attendance	-	
9 September 2023	Championship	25	Toulouse Olympique	H	Shay Stadium	W/D/L	0-0	-	-	Attendance	-	
17 September 2023	Championship	26	Keighley Cougars	A	Cougar Park	W/D/L	0-0	-	-	Attendance	-	
24 September 2023	Championship	27	Swinton Lions	H	Shay Stadium	W/D/L	0-0	-	-	Attendance	-	

== Challenge Cup ==
LEGEND
Win
Draw
Loss

Date	Competition	Rnd	Vrs	H/A	Venue	Result	Score	Tries	Goals	Att	TV	Report
12th March 2023	Challenge Cup	3rd	Featherstone Rovers	A	Post Office Road	W	18-22	Gee, Walmsley, Inman, Jouffret	Keyes 0/2, Jouffret 1/2	Attendance	-	
19th May 2023	Challenge Cup	4th	St Helens	H	Shay Stadium	L	6-26	Fairbank	Jouffret 0/1	Attendance	-	

== 1895 Cup ==
LEGEND
Win
Draw
Loss

Date	Competition	Rnd	Vrs	H/A	Venue	Result	Score	Tries	Goals	Att	TV	Report
22 July 2023	1895 Cup	Semi-Final	London Broncos	A	The Rock	-	-	-	-	Attendance	-	

== Squad statistics ==
- Appearances and points include (Championship, Challenge Cup and Play-offs) as of 09 January 2023.

No	Player	Position	Age	Previous club	Apps	Tries	Goals	DG	Points
1	James Woodburn-Hall	Fullback	27	London Skolars	0	0	0	0	0
2	Lachlan Walmsley	Wing	24	Whitehaven R.L.F.C.	0	0	0	0	0
3	Zack McComb	Centre	27	Sheffield Eagles	0	0	0	0	0
4	Ben Tibbs	Centre	22	Huddersfield Giants	0	0	0	0	0
5	James Saltonstall	Wing	29	Warrington Wolves	0	0	0	0	0
6	Louis Jouffret	Scrum half	26	Whitehaven R.L.F.C.	0	0	0	0	0
7	Joe Keyes	Scrum half	25	Hull Kingston Rovers	0	0	0	0	0
8	Adam Tangata	Prop	30	Wakefield Trinity	0	0	0	0	0
9	Brandon Moore	Hooker	23	Castleford Tigers	0	0	0	0	0
10	Dan Murray	Prop	32	Toronto Wolfpack	0	0	0	0	0
11	Ben Kavanagh	Second row	33	Huddersfield Giants	0	0	0	0	0
12	Matty Gee	Second row	31	Leigh Centurions	0	0	0	0	0
13	Jacob Fairbank	Prop	29	Toulouse Olympique	0	0	0	0	0
14	Kyle Wood	Hooker	35	Hunslet R.L.F.C.	0	0	0	0	0
15	Will Maher	Prop	27	Hull Kingston Rovers	0	0	0	0	0
16	William Calcott	Prop	21	Bradford Bulls Academy	0	0	0	0	0
17	Ryan King	Second row	26	Whitehaven R.L.F.C.	0	0	0	0	0
20	Tom Inman	Prop	22	York Knights	0	0	0	0	0
21	Eribe Doro	Wing	25	Widnes Vikings	0	0	0	0	0
22	Jake Maizen	Winger	26	Sunshine Coast Falcons	0	0	0	0	0
23	Nick Rawsthorne	Fullback	27	Hull Kingston Rovers	0	0	0	0	0
24	Cole Oakley	Centre	22	Warrington Wolves	0	0	0	0	0
25	Ben Forster	Prop	21	Rochdale Hornets	0	0	0	0	0
31	Kevin Larroyer	Second-row	33	Leigh Centurions	0	0	0	0	0

== Transfers ==
=== In ===
	Name	Position	Signed from	Date
-	-	-	-	-

=== Out ===
	Name	Position	Club Signed	Date
-	-	-	-	-
