= 2023 RFL 1895 Cup =

Rugby league competition in the United Kingdom

- Duration: 2 rounds + qualifying
- Number of teams: 4

The 2023 RFL 1895 Cup was the fourth playing of the RFL 1895 Cup, a rugby league football competition for clubs in the United Kingdom. As with 2022, the teams entering the competition were those teams in the RFL Championship and RFL League 1 which reached the sixth round of the Challenge Cup. The final was played at Wembley.

== Semi Final ==
The semi finals were played on the weekend of the 22 and 23 July. It featured the Championship teams that got to the sixth round of the Challenge Cup.

Home	Score	Away	Match Information
Home	Score	Away	Date and Time	Venue	Referee	Attendance
London Broncos	6–10	Halifax Panthers	22 July 2023, 17:00	Rosslyn Park	L. Rush	1,895
York Knights	8–22	Batley Bulldogs	23 July 2023, 12:00	York Community Stadium	J. Vella

== Final ==
12 August 2023
18:00 BST (UTC+01:00)

Batley Bulldogs	10–12	Halifax Panthers
Tries: Morton (72'); Kear (80'); Goals: Hooley (1/2) 72'		Tries: Moore (2'); Goals: Jouffret (4/4) 2', 32' (penalty), 57' (penalty), 61' (penalty)

Wembley Stadium, London
Attendance: 58,213
Referee: Jack Smith
Touch judges: Warren Turley, Cameron Worsley
Player of the Match: Louis Jouffret
(Halifax)

Team details
Batley Bulldogs		Position	Halifax Panthers
Name	Number	Position	Number	Name
Luke Hooley	32	Fullback	18	Brandon Pickersgill
Dale Morton	22	Wing	5	James Saltonstall
Josh Hodson	4	Centre	3	Zack McComb
Elliot Kear	15	Centre	22	Jake Maizen
Aidan McGowan	20	Wing	2	Lachlan Walmsley
James Meadows	14	Stand off	6	Louis Jouffret
Josh Wood	7	Scrum half	1	James Woodburn-Hall
Adam Gledhill	11	Prop forward	16	William Calcott
Ben White	6	Hooker	9	Brandon Moore
James Brown	13	Prop forward	10	Dan Murray
Dane Manning	11	Second row	11	Ben Kavanagh
Kieran Buchanan	3	Second row	12	Matty Gee
Martyn Reilly	30	Loose forward	13	Jacob Fairbank
Alistair Leak	9	Interchange	34	Adam O'Brien
Nyle Flynn	26	Interchange	8	Adam Tangata
Michael Ward	16	Interchange	19	Ryan Lannon
Samy Kibula	20	Interchange	31	Kevin Larroyer
George Senior	18	Reserve	28	Alex Sutcliffe
Craig Lingard		Coach		Simon Grix

The final kicked off at 18:00 on 12 August at Wembley Stadium, following the women's and men's challenge cup finals.
