= 2024 RFL Championship =

Rugby league competition in the United Kingdom

- Teams: 14
- Matches played: 189
- Points scored: 8,308
- Highest attendance: 8,016; Wakefield Trinity vs Toulouse Olympique (19 October 2024)
- Lowest attendance: 331; Whitehaven v Toulouse Olympique (13 July 2024)
- Average attendance: 1,826
- Total attendance: 345,071

2024 season
- Promoted to Super League: Wakefield Trinity
- League Leaders' Shield: Wakefield Trinity
- Relegated to League One: Swinton Lions, Whitehaven, Dewsbury Rams
- Biggest home win: Featherstone Rovers 66–0 Whitehaven (7 July 2024); Wakefield Trinity 72–6 Doncaster (29 September 2024)
- Biggest away win: Swinton Lions 0–60 Wakefield Trinity (1 September 2024)
- Top point-scorer: Max Jowitt (384)
- Top try-scorer: Derrell Olpherts (26)

The 2024 RFL Championship (officially known as the Betfred Championship for sponsorship reasons) was a professional rugby league club competition. The second tier of the British rugby league system comprises 14 clubs – 13 from England and one from France.

The season comprised 26 rounds in the regular season with the top six teams taking part in the play-offs to determine the champions.

The title was won by Wakefield Trinity who beat Toulouse Olympique in the grand final. Wakefield also won the league leader's shield winning 25 of their 26 matches during the regular season.

Wakefield's Max Jowitt became the first player in the British game to score 500 points in a season. Going into the grand final on 494 points, Jowitt kicked the three goals he needed to reach the 500 mark.

Despite Wakefield winning the Championship, there is no automatic promotion to Super League, due to Super League status being dependent on a club's performance under the IMG grading system. However, on 22 October 2024, it was announced that Wakefield had improved their rating to a Grade A, which will now see them playing in Super League for the 2025 season.

== Team changes ==
London Broncos won promotion to the Super League at the end of 2023 and were replaced by Wakefield Trinity who were relegated from Super League. Promoted from League 1 in 2023 were Dewsbury Rams and Doncaster who replaced the 2023 relegated teams, Keighley Cougars and Newcastle Thunder.

== Structure changes ==
There was no automatic promotion from the Championship to Super League at the end of the season. This was due to the introduction of the grading scheme where clubs are graded by a number of factors, not all based on on-field performance.

The Summer Bash round which saw all the fixtures played at one location over a weekend was dropped for 2024 following disappointing attendance figures for the 2022 and 2023 events which were played in Leeds and York respectively.

Following a review of the league structure below Super League, the RFL announced that by the start of the 2026 season, the Championship and League 1 would be equalised in size at 12 teams each. The first step was to reduce the Championship from 14 clubs to 13 at the end of the 2024 season. This was achieved by the bottom two clubs being relegated to League 1 but only the League 1 champions being promoted. The team finishing third-bottom in 2024 played the team winning the League 1 play-offs for the 13th spot in the 2025 Championship.

== Rule changes ==
A number of changes were introduced for 2024.

The "six again" rule was amended so that set restarts would only be awarded if the ball was in the defending team's half of the field. Infringements in the attacking team's half would result in a penalty to the attacking team.

The use of the 18th man was allowed after two players (reduced from three) had failed head impact assessments or a player was unable to continue through injury (not just a head injury) resulting from foul play where the opposing player was sin-binned or sent-off. The use of the green card by the referee ordering injured players off the field for treatment was discontinued in the Championship.

A team awarded a penalty at a scrum had the option to reset the scrum instead of taking the penalty.

For disciplinary processes a category of "reckless tackle" was introduced.

On 26 February 2024, the RFL announced that changes would be made to the 'head on head contact' rule that was previously implemented to start the season. This came after Nu Brown of Super League club Hull FC was controversially shown a red card for a tackle during his side's match against Warrington Wolves. The RFL stated that the rule will be amended, "emphasising that it applies only to initial contact".

== Clubs ==
Locations of English teams competing in the 2024 Championship.
Locations of the 2024 RFL Championship teams in West Yorkshire
Locations of 2024 RFL Championship teams in France

Team	Location	Stadium	Capacity
Barrow Raiders	Barrow-in-Furness	Northern Competitions Stadium	6,000
Batley Bulldogs	Batley	Mount Pleasant	7,500
Bradford Bulls	Bradford	Odsal Stadium	22,000
Dewsbury Rams	Dewsbury	Crown Flatt	5,100
Doncaster	Doncaster	Eco-Power Stadium	15,231
Featherstone Rovers	Featherstone	Millennium Stadium	8,000
Halifax Panthers	Halifax	The Shay	10,401
Sheffield Eagles	Sheffield	Olympic Legacy Park	1,320
Swinton Lions	Sale	Heywood Road	3,387
Toulouse Olympique	Toulouse	Stade Ernest-Wallon	19,500
Wakefield Trinity	Wakefield	DIY Kitchens Stadium	9,333
Whitehaven	Whitehaven	Recreation Ground	7,500
Widnes Vikings	Widnes	DCBL Stadium	13,350
York Knights	York	York Community Stadium	8,005

== Table ==
Pos	Team	Pld	W	D	L	PF	PA	PD	Pts	Qualification
1	Wakefield Trinity	26	25	0	1	1010	262	+748	50	Semi-finals
2	Toulouse Olympique	26	18	1	7	782	384	+398	37	Semi-finals
3	Bradford Bulls	26	16	2	8	682	387	+295	34	Eliminators
4	York Knights	26	15	0	11	655	473	+182	30	Eliminators
5	Widnes Vikings	26	14	1	11	551	475	+76	29	Eliminators
6	Featherstone Rovers	26	14	0	12	622	500	+122	28	Eliminators
7	Sheffield Eagles	26	14	0	12	626	526	+100	28	
8	Doncaster	26	12	1	13	498	619	−121	25	
9	Halifax Panthers	26	11	0	15	509	650	−141	22	
10	Batley Bulldogs	26	11	0	15	422	591	−169	22	
11	Barrow Raiders	26	9	1	16	458	758	−300	19	
12	Swinton Lions	26	9	0	17	466	678	−212	18	League One play-off
13	Whitehaven	26	8	2	16	451	854	−403	18	Relegation to League One
14	Dewsbury Rams	26	2	0	24	344	919	−575	4	Relegation to League One

Source: RFL
Rules for classification: 1) Competition points; 2) Points difference; 3) Points percentage (points scored/points conceded x 100)

== Play-offs ==
Eliminators
4	York Knights	27
5	Widnes Vikings	10
3	Bradford Bulls	25
6	Featherstone Rovers	12

Semi-finals
1	Wakefield Trinity	22
4	York Knights	13
2	Toulouse Olympique	21
3	Bradford Bulls	20

Grand Final
1	Wakefield Trinity	36
2	Toulouse Olympique	0

=== Week 1: Eliminators ===
5 October 2024
15:00

York Knights	27–10	Widnes Vikings
Tries: Williams, Law, Lineham (2), Dee; Goals: Williams (3/5); Drop goals: Harris		Tries: Lloyd; Goals: Gilmore (3/3)

York Community Stadium
Attendance: 2,010
Referee: J. Vella

6 October 2024
15:00

Bradford Bulls	25–12	Featherstone Rovers
Tries: Myers, Gill, Lilley, Appo; Goals: Lilley (4/5); Drop goals: Lilley		Tries: Hardcastle, Day; Goals: Reynolds (2/2)

Odsal Stadium
Referee: A. Moore

=== Week 2: Semi-finals ===
13 October 2024
15:00

Wakefield Trinity	22–13	York Knights
Tries: Jowitt, Gale, Olpherts, Thornley; Goals: Jowitt (3/4)		Tries: Field, Hingano; Goals: Dagger (2/2); Drop goals: Harris

Belle Vue
Attendance: 5,946
Referee: A. Moore

13 October 2024
17:00

Toulouse Olympique	21–20	Bradford Bulls
Tries: Laguerre, Ulberg, Armitage, Marion; Goals: Shorrocks (2/4); Drop goals: Pelissier		Tries: Lilley, Pele, Appo; Goals: Lilley (4/4)

Stade Ernest Wallon
Attendance: 2,680
Referee: T. Grant

=== Week 3: Championship Grand Final ===
19 October 2024
19:00

Wakefield Trinity	36–0	Toulouse Olympique
Tries: Olpherts (2), Ashurst, McGillvary (2), Thornley, Pratt; Goals: Jowitt (3/6), McGillvary (1/1)

Belle Vue
Attendance: 8,016
Referee: A. Moore

Team details
Wakefield Trinity		Position	Toulouse Olympique
Name	Number	Position	Number	Name
Max Jowitt	1	FB	1	Olly Ashall-Bott
Jermaine McGillvary	2	WG	2	Paul Ulberg
Iain Thornley	3	CE	3	Guy Armitage
Oli Pratt	4	CE	4	Paul Marcon
Derrell Olpherts	5	WG	5	Benjamin Laguerre
Luke Gale	6	SO	6	Ryan Rivett
Mason Lino	7	SH	7	Jake Shorrocks
Josh Bowden	8	PR	8	Lambert Belmas
Liam Hood	9	HK	9	Calum Gahan
Renouf Atoni	10	PF	10	Harrison Hansen
Matty Ashurst	11	SR	11	Maxime Stefani
Isaiah Vagana	12	SR	12	Dominique Peyroux
Jay Pitts	13	LF	13	Anthony Marion
Lachlan Walmsley	14	IN	14	Reubenn Rennie
Caleb Uele	15	IN	15	Éloi Pélissier
Ky Rodwell	16	IN	16	James Roumanos
Thomas Doyle	17	IN	17	Dimitri Biscarro
Mattieu Cozza	18	CS	18	Greg Richards
Daryl Powell		Coach		Sylvain Houles

=== Championship play-off ===
On 13 October Swinton, the team finishing 12th in the regular season, played Hunslet, the League One play-off final winners to decide the 13th team in the 2025 Championship. Swinton lost to Hunslet and were relegated to League One for 2025.

Championship play-off

13 October 2024
19:30

Swinton Lions	20–22	Hunslet
Tries: Williams, Cox, Wood, Vaughan; Goals: Abram (2/4)		Tries: Turner, Berry, Flanagan, Render; Goals: Beharrell (3/4)

Heywood Road
Attendance: 885
Referee: J. Vella

== Player statistics ==
=== Top 10 try scorers ===
Rank	Player (s)	Club	Tries
1	(England) Derrell Olpherts	Wakefield Trinity	26
2	(England) Max Jowitt	Wakefield Trinity	23
3	(Cook Islands) Paul Ulberg	Toulouse Olympique	21
4	(Scotland) Lachlan Walmsley	Wakefield Trinity	20
5	(England) Connor Wynne	Featherstone Rovers	19
6	(England) Joe Burton	Batley Bulldogs	18
7	(England) Joe Brown	York Knights	17
8	(England) Matty Dawson-Jones	Sheffield Eagles	16
8	(France) Maxime Stefani	Toulouse Olympique	16
10	(England) Kieran Gill	Bradford Bulls	15
10	(England) Jayden Hatton	Swinton Lions	15
10	(England) Ryan Ince	Widnes Vikings	15

=== Top 10 goal scorers ===
Rank	Player	Club	Goals
1	(England) Max Jowitt	Wakefield Trinity	146
2	(England) Jordan Lilley	Bradford Bulls	108
3	(England) Cory Aston	Sheffield Eagles	88
4	(England) Tom Gilmore	Widnes Vikings	84
5	(England) Jake Shorrocks	Toulouse Olympique	81
6	(France) Louis Jouffret	Halifax Panthers	66
7	(England) Connor Robinson	Doncaster RLFC	65
8	(England) Ryan Shaw	Barrow Raiders	55
9	(England) Josh Woods	Batley Bulldogs	54
10	(England) Ben Reynolds	Featherstone Rovers	48

=== Top 10 point scorers ===
Rank	Player	Club	Points
1	(England) Max Jowitt	Wakefield Trinity	384
2	(England) Jordan Lilley	Bradford Bulls	245
3	(England) Tom Gilmore	Widnes Vikings	193
4	(England) Cory Aston	Sheffield Eagles	192
5	(England) Jake Shorrocks	Toulouse Olympique	178
6	(France) Louis Jouffret	Halifax Panthers	164
7	(England) Connor Robinson	Doncaster RLFC	151
8	(England) Ryan Shaw	Barrow Raiders	138
9	(England) Ben Reynolds	Featherstone Rovers	124
10	(England) Josh Woods	Batley Bulldogs	115

As of 22 October 2024: (Round 27)

== Discipline ==
=== Red cards ===
Rank	Player	Club	Cards
1	(England) Delaine Gittens-Bedward	Barrow Raiders	1
1	(England) Brad Walker	Barrow Raiders	1
1	(England) Greg Worthington	Barrow Raiders	1
1	(Scotland) Dale Ferguson	Dewsbury Rams	1
1	(England) Gareth Gale	Featherstone Rovers	1
1	(England) Ed Barber	Halifax Panthers	1
1	(England) Matty Gee	Halifax Panthers	1
1	(Republic of Ireland) Zack McComb	Halifax Panthers	1
1	(England) Matty Marsh	Sheffield Eagles	1
1	(England) Jordy Gibson	Swinton Lions	1
1	(Italy) Richard Lepori	Swinton Lions	1
1	(England) Gavin Rodden	Swinton Lions	1
1	(Tonga) Sitaleki Akauola	Toulouse Olympique	1
1	(Samoa) Harrison Hansen	Toulouse Olympique	1
1	(Australia) Owen McCarron	Whitehaven RLFC	1
1	(England) Jacob Gannon	York Knights	1

=== Yellow cards ===
Rank	Player	Club	Cards
1	(Papua New Guinea) Edene Gebbie	Whitehaven RLFC	5
2	(Australia) Mitchel Souter	Bradford Bulls	4
2	(France) Lambert Belmas	Toulouse Olympique	4
2	(Italy) Ryan King	Whitehaven RLFC	4
5	(England) Adam Gledhill	Batley Bulldogs	3
5	(England) Dane Manning	Batley Bulldogs	3
5	(Samoa) Jorge Taufua	Bradford Bulls	3
5	(England) Ronan Dixon	Dewsbury Rams	3
5	(Scotland) Danny Addy	Featherstone Rovers	3
5	(England) Dec Patton	Featherstone Rovers	3
5	(England) George Roby	Swinton Lions	3
5	(England) Matty Fleming	Widnes Vikings	3
13	(England) Eribe Doro	Bradford Bulls	2
13	(New Zealand) Franklin Pele	Bradford Bulls	2
13	(England) Jayden Myers	Bradford Bulls	2
13	(England) Bailey O'Connor	Dewsbury Rams	2
13	(Jamaica) Kieran Rush	Dewsbury Rams	2
13	Brad England	Featherstone Rovers	2
13	(England) Josh Hardcastle	Featherstone Rovers	2
13	(France) Gadwin Springer	Featherstone Rovers	2
13	(England) Jacob Fairbank	Halifax Panthers	2
13	(England) Matty Dawson-Jones	Sheffield Eagles	2
13	(Jamaica) Joel Farrell	Sheffield Eagles	2
13	(England) Joshua Eaves	Swinton Lions	2
13	(England) Gavin Rodden	Swinton Lions	2
13	(Cook Islands) Reubenn Rennie	Toulouse Olympique	2
13	(Scotland) Luke Bain	Wakefield Trinity	2
13	(England) Jack Croft	Wakefield Trinity	2
13	(Scotland) Sam Brooks	Widnes Vikings	2
13	(England) Will Dagger	York Knights	2
30	(Scotland) Brett Carter	Barrow Raiders	1
30	(England) Ryan Johnston	Barrow Raiders	1
30	(England) Ryan Shaw	Barrow Raiders	1
30	(Australia) Jarrad Stack	Barrow Raiders	1
30	(England) Brad Walker	Barrow Raiders	1
30	(England) Tom Walker	Barrow Raiders	1
30	(England) Josh Wood	Barrow Raiders	1
30	(England) James Brown	Batley Bulldogs	1
30	(Scotland) Kieran Buchanan	Batley Bulldogs	1
30	(England) Luke Hooley	Batley Bulldogs	1
30	(Papua New Guinea) Nixon Putt	Batley Bulldogs	1
30	(England) John Davies	Bradford Bulls	1
30	(Australia) Zac Fulton	Bradford Bulls	1
30	(England) Kieran Gill	Bradford Bulls	1
30	(England) Tom Holmes	Bradford Bulls	1
30	(England) Fenton Rogers	Bradford Bulls	1
30	(England) Jamie Field	Dewsbury Rams	1
30	(England) Matt Garside	Dewsbury Rams	1
30	(England) Jacob Hookem	Dewsbury Rams	1
30	(England) Elliott Morris	Dewsbury Rams	1
30	(England) Paul Sykes	Dewsbury Rams	1
30	(England) Calum Turner	Dewsbury Rams	1
30	(England) Jackson Walker	Dewsbury Rams	1
30	(England) Marcus Walker	Dewsbury Rams	1
30	(England) Brett Ferres	Doncaster RLFC	1
30	(England) Brad Knowles-Tagg	Doncaster RLFC	1
30	(Fiji) Joe Lovodua	Doncaster RLFC	1
30	(Samoa) Suaia Matagi	Doncaster RLFC	1
30	(Australia) Pauli Pauli	Doncaster RLFC	1
30	(England) Connor Robinson	Doncaster RLFC	1
30	(England) Jack Arnold	Featherstone Rovers	1
30	(Turkey) Yusuf Aydin	Featherstone Rovers	1
30	(England) Harry Bowes	Featherstone Rovers	1
30	(England) Jack Bussey	Featherstone Rovers	1
30	(England) Ben Reynolds	Featherstone Rovers	1
30	(England) Connor Wynne	Featherstone Rovers	1
30	(Scotland) Ben Kavanagh	Halifax Panthers	1
30	(France) Kevin Larroyer	Halifax Panthers	1
30	(Cook Islands) Adam Tangata	Halifax Panthers	1
30	(England) Gareth Widdop	Halifax Panthers	1
30	(England) Eddie Battye	Sheffield Eagles	1
30	(England) Blake Broadbent	Sheffield Eagles	1
30	(England) Alex Foster	Sheffield Eagles	1
30	(England) James Glover	Sheffield Eagles	1
30	(Scotland) Bayley Liu	Sheffield Eagles	1
30	(Samoa) Jesse Sene-Lefao	Sheffield Eagles	1
30	(England) Jayden Hatton	Swinton Lions	1
30	(Italy) Richard Lepori	Swinton Lions	1
30	(France) Robin Brochon	Toulouse Olympique	1
30	(France) Paul Marcon	Toulouse Olympique	1
30	(France) Éloi Pélissier	Toulouse Olympique	1
30	(Cook Islands) Dominique Peyroux	Toulouse Olympique	1
30	(Cook Islands) Paul Ulberg	Toulouse Olympique	1
30	(England) Matty Ashurst	Wakefield Trinity	1
30	(Scotland) Liam Hood	Wakefield Trinity	1
30	(England) Max Jowitt	Wakefield Trinity	1
30	(Samoa) Mason Lino	Wakefield Trinity	1
30	(England) Derrell Olpherts	Wakefield Trinity	1
30	(Scotland) Lachlan Walmsley	Wakefield Trinity	1
30	(England) Sam Ackroyd	Whitehaven RLFC	1
30	(Australia) Lucas Castle	Whitehaven RLFC	1
30	(Australia) Lachlan Hanneghan	Whitehaven RLFC	1
30	(England) James Newton	Whitehaven RLFC	1
30	(England) Curtis Teare	Whitehaven RLFC	1
30	(England) Sam Web-Campbell	Whitehaven RLFC	1
30	(Wales) Mike Butt	Widnes Vikings	1
30	(England) Ryan Ince	Widnes Vikings	1
30	(England) Danny Langtree	Widnes Vikings	1
30	(England) Max Roberts	Widnes Vikings	1
30	(England) Connor Bailey	York Knights	1
30	(England) Jordan Thompson	York Knights	1
30	(New Zealand) Nikau Williams	York Knights	1

As of 8 October 2024: (Round 27)

== Broadcasting ==
The two-year deal with Viaplay expired at the end of the 2023 season. No new deal was arranged with any provider for 2024.
