= 2022 RFL Championship =

2022 rugby league competition in the United Kingdom

- League: Championship
- Duration: 29 January 2022 – 2 October 2022
- Teams: 14
- Matches played: 194
- Points scored: 9,714
- Highest attendance: 7,233; Championship Grand Final
- Lowest attendance: 385; Sheffield Eagles v Newcastle Thunder (22 April 2022)
- Average attendance: 1,880
- Total attendance: 364,822
- Broadcast partners: Premier Sports

2022 season
- Promoted to Super League: Leigh Centurions
- League Leaders Shield: Leigh Centurions
- Biggest home win: Leigh Centurions 100–4 York City Knights (21 August 2022)
- Biggest away win: Workington Town 0–66 Leigh Centurions (10 July 2022)

Promotion and relegation
- Promoted from League 1: Keighley Cougars; Swinton Lions
- Relegated to League 1: Workington Town; Dewsbury Rams

The 2022 Rugby Football League Championship is a rugby league football competition played in England. It is the second tier of the three tiers of professional rugby league in England, below Super League, and above League 1. The sponsors for the league are the bookmakers, Betfred and the league will continue to be known as the Betfred Championship.

The league was won by Leigh Centurions who beat Batley Bulldogs 44–12 in the Grand Final to win promotion to Super League in 2023. Leigh also won the league leaders shield by finishing top of the regular season league table. Dewsbury Rams and Workington Town were relegated from the Championship to play in the 2023 League One.

== Rule changes ==
The RFL approved three rules changes for 2022. On 20 January 2022, The RFL confirmed that scrums will return to all competitions, having been suspended as part of the game's COVID-19 response in 2020 and 2021. Scrums are only being reintroduced for errors (knock-on, forward pass or accidental offside) in the first four tackles of a set. Other cases, where previously a scrum would have been awarded, for example - ball into touch on the full, ball kicked or passed into touch, incorrect play the ball; will result in a handover.

The ball steal law will revert to the 2020 rule where the ball can only be stolen in a one-on-one tackle and not during a multi-person tackle where the additional tacklers have peeled off the tackle before the steal. Finally, injured players will be required to leave the pitch for treatment, if possible, following complaints that stoppages for injury spoil the speed and flow of the game.

== Teams ==
The league comprised 14 teams. The regular season comprised 27 rounds, each teams will play each of the others twice (home and away) with the 21st round, the Summer Bash, seeing seven additional fixtures between the 14 teams played at the same venue, which this year was Headingley stadium in Leeds.

Locations of the 2022 RFL Championship teams
Locations of the 2022 RFL Championship teams in West Yorkshire

Team	Stadium	Capacity	Location
Barrow Raiders (2022 season)	Craven Park	6,000	Barrow in Furness, Cumbria
Batley Bulldogs (2022 season)	Mount Pleasant	7,500	Batley, West Yorkshire
Bradford Bulls (2022 season)	Odsal Stadium	22,000	Bradford, West Yorkshire
Dewsbury Rams (2022 season)	Crown Flatt	5,800	Dewsbury, West Yorkshire
Featherstone Rovers (2022 season)	Post Office Road	8,000	Featherstone, West Yorkshire
Halifax (2022 season)	The Shay	10,401	Halifax, West Yorkshire
Leigh Centurions (2022 season)	Leigh Sports Village	12,000	Leigh, Greater Manchester
London Broncos (2022 season)	Plough Lane	9,215	Wimbledon, London
Newcastle Thunder (2022 season)	Kingston Park	10,200	Newcastle upon Tyne, Newcastle
Sheffield Eagles (2022 season)	Olympic Legacy Park	3,900	Sheffield, South Yorkshire
Whitehaven (2022 season)	Recreation Ground	7,500	Whitehaven, Cumbria
Widnes Vikings (2022 season)	DCBL Stadium	13,350	Widnes, Cheshire
Workington Town (2022 season)	Derwent Park	10,000	Workington, Cumbria
York City Knights (2022 season)	York Community Stadium	8,005	York, North Yorkshire

== Regular season table ==
Pos	Team	Pld	W	D	L	PF	PA	PD	Pts	Qualification
1	Leigh Centurions	27	26	0	1	1306	208	+1098	52	Championship Leaders' Shield & advance to play-off semi-final
2	Featherstone Rovers	27	23	1	3	1060	468	+592	47	Advance to play-off semi-final
3	Halifax Panthers	27	20	0	7	837	442	+395	40	Advance to play-off eliminators
4	Barrow Raiders	27	18	1	8	757	587	+170	37	Advance to play-off eliminators
5	Batley Bulldogs	27	17	2	8	738	551	+187	36	Advance to play-off eliminators
6	York City Knights	27	18	0	9	677	596	+81	36	Advance to play-off eliminators
7	Sheffield Eagles	27	12	0	15	701	660	+41	24	
8	Widnes Vikings	27	12	0	15	567	679	−112	24	
9	Bradford Bulls	27	11	0	16	523	677	−154	22	
10	Whitehaven	27	9	1	17	488	854	−366	19	
11	London Broncos	27	8	1	18	548	740	−192	17	
12	Newcastle Thunder	27	7	1	19	559	877	−318	15	
13	Dewsbury Rams	27	3	1	23	385	964	−579	7	Relegated to League 1
14	Workington Town	27	1	0	26	296	1139	−843	2	Relegated to League 1

== End of season awards ==
- Foundation of the year: Sheffield Eagles
- Club of the year: Barrow Raiders
- Coach of the year: Paul Crarey (Barrow Raiders)
- Young player of the year: Sam Eseh (Featherstone Rovers)
- Player of the year: Edwin Ipape (Leigh Centurions)

== Play-offs ==
The same play-off structure as used in 2021 was used.

=== Team bracket ===
Eliminators
3	Halifax Panthers	24
6	York City Knights	26
4	Barrow Raiders	8
5	Batley Bulldogs	18

Semi-finals
1	Leigh Centurions	70
6	York City Knights	10
2	Featherstone Rovers	28
5	Batley Bulldogs	32

Grand Final
1	Leigh Centurions	44
5	Batley Bulldogs	12

=== Summary ===
Eliminators
Home	Score	Away	Match Information
Home	Score	Away	Date and Time	Venue	Referee	Attendance
Halifax Panthers	24–26	York City Knights	18 September 2022, 17:30	The Shay	J. Vella	1,850
Barrow Raiders	8–18	Batley Bulldogs	18 September 2022, 15:00	Craven Park	M. Griffiths	3,595

Semi-finals
Home	Score	Away	Match Information
Home	Score	Away	Date and Time	Venue	Referee	Attendance
Leigh Centurions	70–10	York City Knights	25 September 2022, 14:00	Leigh Sports Village	M. Griffiths	3,329
Featherstone Rovers	28–32	Batley Bulldogs	25 September 2022, 16:00	Post Office Road	R. Hicks	4,000

Championship Grand Final
Home	Score	Away	Match Information
Home	Score	Away	Date and Time	Venue	Referee	Attendance
Leigh Centurions	44–12	Batley Bulldogs	2 October 2022, 18:30	Leigh Sports Village	C. Kendall	7,233

== Player statistics ==
=== Top 10 try scorers ===
Rank	Player (s)	Club	Tries
1	(Thailand) Theerapol Ritson	Barrow Raiders	28
1	(Scotland) Lachlan Walmsley	Halifax Panthers	28
3	(Samoa) Krisnan Inu	Leigh Centurions	24
3	(Papua New Guinea) Nene Macdonald	Leigh Centurions	24
5	(Papua New Guinea) Edwin Ipape	Leigh Centurions	22
6	(England) Johnny Campbell	Batley Bulldogs	21
6	(England) Morgan Smith	Featherstone Rovers	21
8	(England) Luke Hooley	Batley Bulldogs	20
8	(England) Dale Morton	Batley Bulldogs	20
8	(England) Connor Jones	Featherstone Rovers	20
8	(Australia) Blake Ferguson	Leigh Centurions	20

=== Top 10 goal scorers ===
Rank	Player	Club	Goals
1	(Samoa) Krisnan Inu	Leigh Centurions	147
2	(England) Craig Hall	Featherstone Rovers	132
3	(England) Tom Gilmore	Batley Bulldogs	117
4	(Republic of Ireland) Joe Keyes	Halifax Panthers	108
5	(England) Ryan Shaw	Barrow Raiders	77
6	(England) Dec Patton	Bradford Bulls	76
7	(England) Oliver Leyland	London Broncos	52
8	(England) Steve Tyrer	Widnes Vikings	48
9	(England) Ben Reynolds	Leigh Centurions	47
9	(New Zealand) Nikau Williams	Whitehaven RLFC	47

=== Top 10 point scorers ===
Rank	Player	Club	Points
1	(Samoa) Krisnan Inu	Leigh Centurions	390
2	(England) Craig Hall	Featherstone Rovers	324
3	(Republic of Ireland) Joe Keyes	Halifax Panthers	269
4	(England) Tom Gilmore	Batley Bulldogs	254
5	(England) Ryan Shaw	Barrow Raiders	182
6	(England) Dec Patton	Bradford Bulls	160
7	(England) Liam Harris	York Knights	158
8	(Malta) Jarrod Sammut	Barrow Raiders	149
9	(England) Ben Reynolds	Leigh Centurions	134
10	(Scotland) Lachlan Walmsley	Halifax Panthers	122

== Discipline ==
=== Red cards ===
Rank	Player	Club	Cards
1	(France) Hakim Miloudi	Barrow Raiders	1
1	(England) Johnny Campbell	Batley Bulldogs	1
1	(England) David Foggin-Johnston	Bradford Bulls	1
1	(England) Tom Holroyd	Bradford Bulls	1
1	(England) Reiss Butterworth	Dewsbury Rams	1
1	(England) Paul Sykes	Dewsbury Rams	1
1	(England) Sam Eseh	Featherstone Rovers	1
1	(New Zealand) Tyla Hepi	Featherstone Rovers	1
1	(Zimbabwe) Titus Gwaze	Halifax Panthers	1
1	(England) Joe Martin	Halifax Panthers	1
1	(England) Greg Worthington	Halifax Panthers	1
1	(Papua New Guinea) Nene Macdonald	Leigh Centurions	1
1	(Republic of Ireland) James McDonnell	Leigh Centurions	1
1	(New Zealand) Mitch Clark	Newcastle Thunder	1
1	(England) Jake Shorrocks	Newcastle Thunder	1
1	(Jamaica) Joel Farrell	Sheffield Eagles	1
1	(Scotland) Bayley Liu	Sheffield Eagles	1
1	(Scotland) Guy Graham	Whitehaven RLFC	1
1	(England) Karl Olstrom	Whitehaven RLFC	1
1	(England) Adam Lawton	Widnes Vikings	1
1	(England) Jordan Thomson	Workington Town	1

=== Yellow cards ===
Rank	Player	Club	Cards
1	(England) Paul Sykes	Dewsbury Rams	4
2	(New Zealand) Krisnan Inu	Leigh Centurions	3
2	(Papua New Guinea) Wellington Albert	London Broncos	3
2	(England) Danny Craven	Widnes Vikings	3
2	(England) Adam Lawton	Widnes Vikings	3
6	(Scotland) Sam Brooks	Barrow Raiders	2
6	(Australia) Jarrad Stack	Barrow Raiders	2
6	(England) James Brown	Batley Bulldogs	2
6	(England) Sam Hallas	Bradford Bulls	2
6	(England) Dec Patton	Bradford Bulls	2
6	(England) Reiss Butterworth	Dewsbury Rams	2
6	(England) Ollie Greensmith	Dewsbury Rams	2
6	(England) Ben Reynolds	Leigh Centurions	2
6	(England) Luke Briscoe	Featherstone Rovers	2
6	(England) Jack Broadbent	Featherstone Rovers	2
6	(England) Matthew Wildie	Featherstone Rovers	2
6	(Italy) James Saltonstall	Halifax Panthers	2
6	(New Zealand) Mitch Clark	Newcastle Thunder	2
6	(England) Vila Halafihi	Sheffield Eagles	2
6	(England) Tom Holmes	Sheffield Eagles	2
6	(England) Anthony Thackeray	Sheffield Eagles	2
6	(England) Kieran Hudson	Whitehaven RLFC	2
6	(Italy) Ryan King	Whitehaven RLFC	2
6	(England) Eribe Doro	Widnes Vikings	2
6	(England) Owen Farnworth	Widnes Vikings	2
6	(England) Matty Marsh	York Knights	2
6	(Australia) Pauli Pauli	York Knights	2
28	70 players	-	1

== Broadcasting ==
The rights to show matches from the Championship was until November 2020 held by Sky TV but the RFL negotiated a new deal with Sky which removed Championship games from the existing contract, and instead the RFL signed a new deal with Premier Sports. This deal resulted in one match from each round being broadcast live on a Monday evening.
