= Joe Martin (rugby league) =

English rugby league footballer

Personal information
- Full name: Joseph Martin
- Born: 28 March 1995 (age 31) Halifax, West Yorkshire, England

Playing information
- Position: Fullback
Club
Years	Team	Pld	T	G	FG	P
2014–18	Halifax	2	0	0	0	0
2015(loan)	→ Gloucestershire All Golds	0	0	0	0	0
2018	Oldham	2	2	0	0	8
2019–21	Dewsbury Rams	15	2	0	0	8
2022	Halifax Panthers	11	1	0	0	4
	Total	30	5	0	0	20
- Source: As of 5 January 2023

Joseph Martin (born 28 March 1995) is a former professional rugby league footballer who played as a fullback.

== Background ==
Martin was born in Halifax, West Yorkshire, England.

== Career ==
Martin has previously spent time on loan at the Gloucestershire All Golds, and at Oldham RLFC.
