= Danny Langtree =

English rugby league player

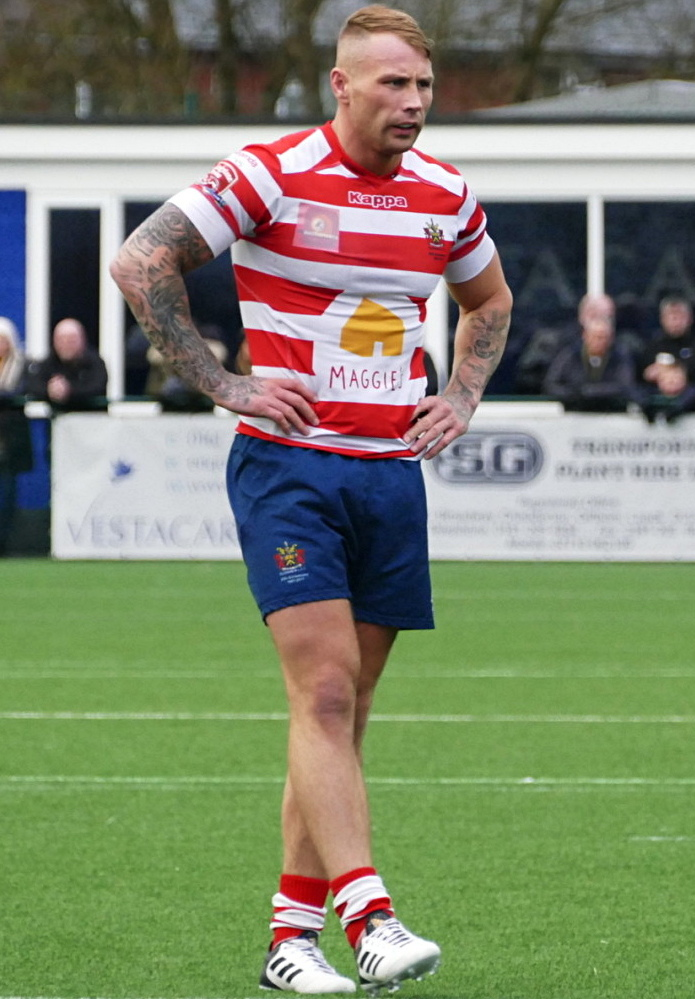

Personal information
- Full name: Daniel Langtree
- Born: 18 February 1991 (age 34) St Helens, Merseyside, England
- Height: 5 ft 11 in (1.80 m)
- Weight: 15 st 1 lb (96 kg)

Playing information
- Position: Second-row, Loose forward, Prop
Club
Years	Team	Pld	T	G	FG	P
2012–18	Oldham R.L.F.C.	148	70	0	0	280
2019	Hull F.C.	0	0	0	0	0
2019(loan)	→ Doncaster R.L.F.C.	3	0	0	0	0
2019–21	Oldham R.L.F.C.	24	19	0	0	76
2022–23	Barrow Raiders	37	6	0	0	24
2024–	Widnes Vikings	10	4	0	0	16
	Total	222	99	0	0	396
- Source: As of 28 November 2024

Danny Langtree (born 18 February 1991) is a professional rugby league footballer who plays as a forward for Widnes Vikings in the RFL Championship.

He spent two spells at Oldham RLFC and is their highest try scorer.

== Background ==
Langtree was born in St Helens, Merseyside, England.

== Career ==
Daniel Langtree played his junior rugby league for the Blackbrook Royals and was a product of the St Helens Academy system. In 2009 he was sacked by the Saints and banned from rugby for two years for failing a drugs test after being found to have traces of cocaine in his system.

Langtree previously played for Hull F.C. in the Super League until his contract was terminated in April 2019, and Oldham in the Championship and League 1.

=== Barrow Raiders ===
On 13 October 2021, it was reported that he had signed for Barrow in the RFL Championship.

=== Widnes Vikings ===
On 11 November 2023 it was reported that he had signed for Widnes in the RFL Championship.
