= Alistair Leak =

English rugby league footballer

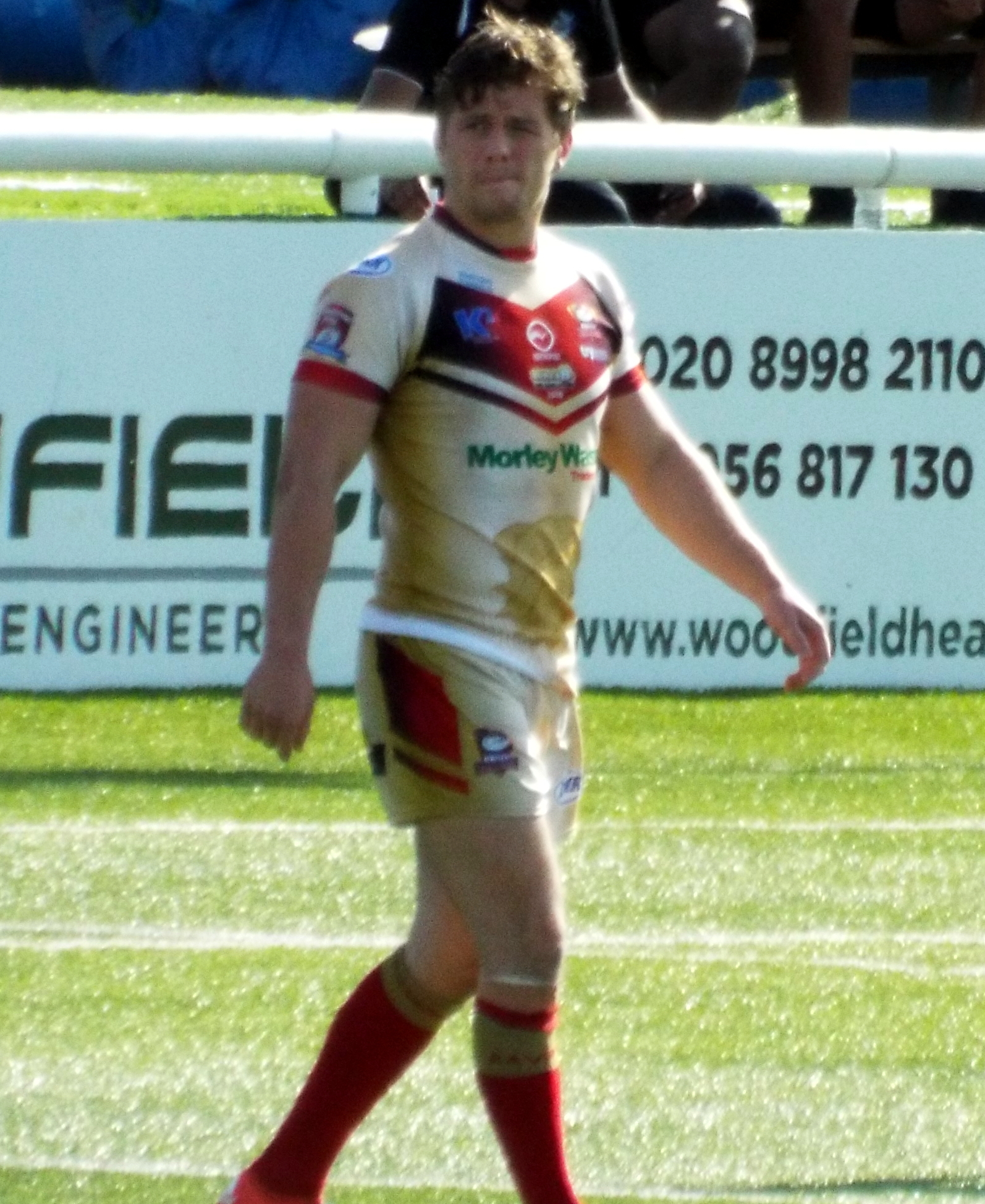

Personal information
- Born: 5 April 1992 (age 34) Cumbria, England
- Height: 5 ft 9 in (1.76 m)
- Weight: 16 st 1 lb (102 kg)

Playing information
- Position: Hooker
Club
Years	Team	Pld	T	G	FG	P
2011–12	Egremont Rangers	1	0	0	0	0
2013–26	Batley Bulldogs	296	89	0	0	356
	Total	297	89	0	0	356
- Source: As of 12 September 2026

Alistair Leak (born 5 April 1992) is a former professional rugby league footballer who played as a hooker for the Batley Bulldogs in the Championship.

Leak has previously played for the Egremont Rangers.

He retired at the end of the 2026 season after the 25-18 defeat to Sheffield Eagles in the play-offs.
