= Brad Knowles (rugby league) =

English rugby league footballer

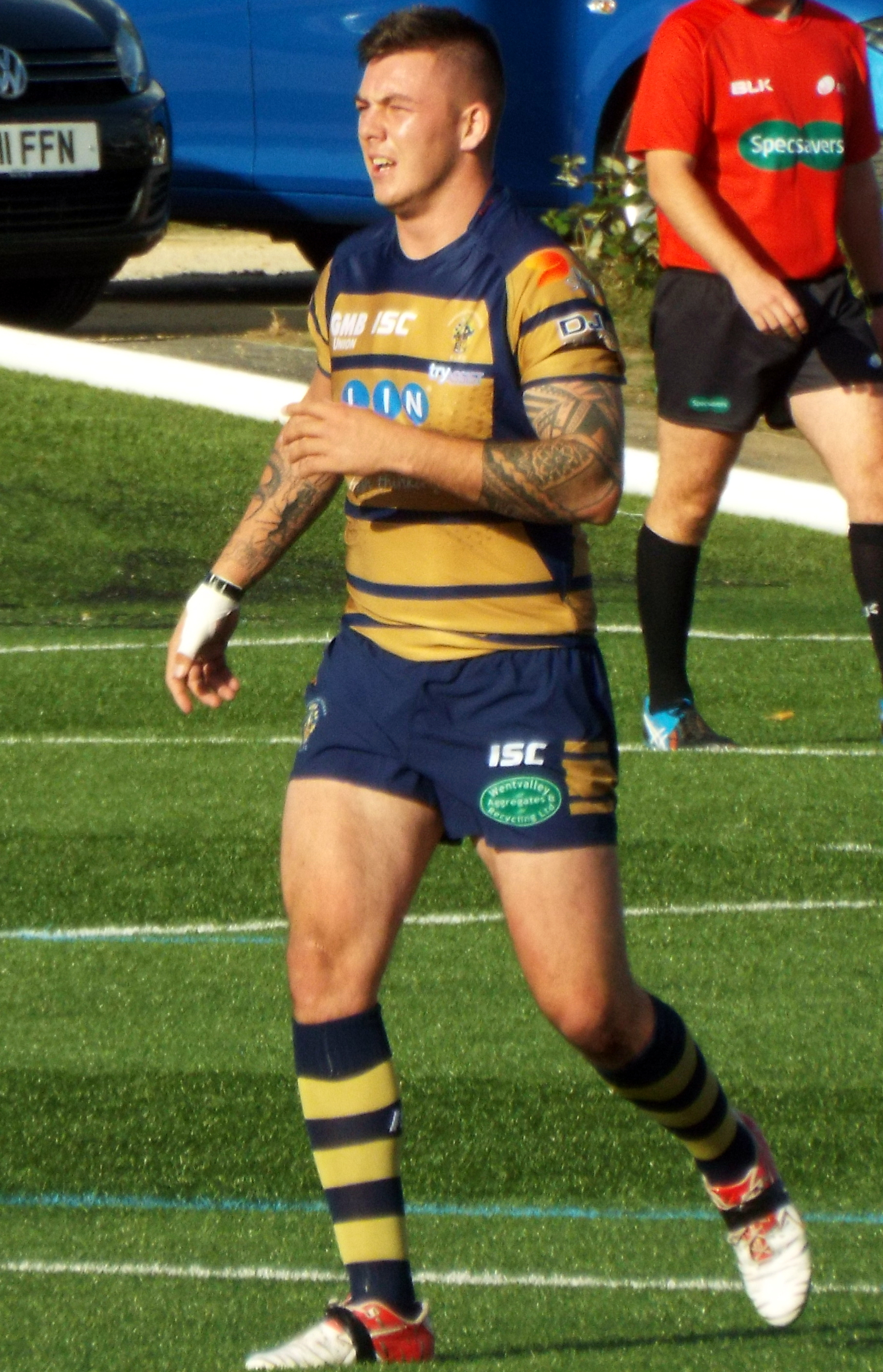

Personal information
- Full name: Bradley Knowles-Tagg
- Born: 31 July 1993 (age 33) Castleford, Yorkshire, England
- Height: 6 ft 2 in (188 cm)
- Weight: 15 st 4 lb (97 kg)

Playing information
- Position: Second-row, Centre, Wing
Club
Years	Team	Pld	T	G	FG	P
2015–18	Featherstone Rovers	75	8	0	0	32
2019–21	Sheffield Eagles	49	7	0	0	28
2022	Halifax Panthers	2	0	0	0	0
2023–	Doncaster	74	2	0	0	8
	Total	200	17	0	0	68
- Source: As of 6 September 2026

Bradley Knowles or Brad Knowles (born 31 July 1993) is a professional rugby league footballer who plays as a second-row or prop for Doncaster in the RFL Championship.

== Background ==
Knowles was born in Castleford, West Yorkshire, England.

== Career ==
In 2019 he helped the Sheffield Eagles to win the inaugural 1895 Cup as they defeated Widnes Vikings 36–18 in the final.

In October 2021 Knowles signed for Halifax Panthers for the 2022 season.
