= Owen Farnworth =

English rugby league footballer (born 1999)

Personal information
- Born: 11 February 1999 (age 27) Preston, Lancashire, England
- Height: 6 ft 1 in (1.85 m)
- Weight: 15 st 10 lb (100 kg)

Playing information
- Position: Prop, Loose forward
Club
Years	Team	Pld	T	G	FG	P
2017–23	Widnes Vikings	80	3	0	0	12
2024–	Oldham	75	12	0	0	48
2025(loan)	→ Rochdale Hornets	2	0	0	0	0
	Total	157	15	0	0	60
- Source: As of 17 November 2026

Owen Farnworth (born 11 February 1999) is a professional rugby league footballer who plays as a prop for Oldham in the RFL Championship.

== Playing career ==
=== Widnes Vikings ===
In 2017 he made his Super League début for Widnes against the Leeds Rhinos.

=== Oldham RLFC ===
On 17 Oct 2023 it was confirmed that he would join Oldham RLFC for the 2024 season on a 2-year deal.
