= Charlie Graham =

American baseball player (1878–1948)

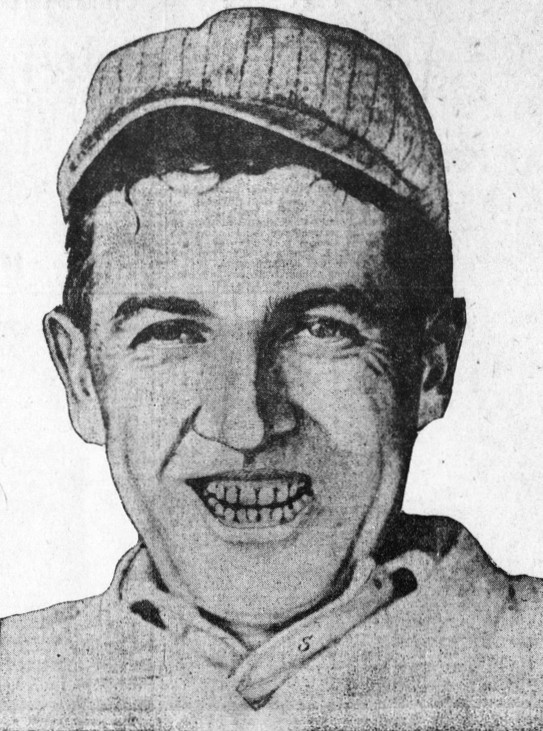
- Catcher
- Born: April 24, 1878; Santa Clara, California, U.S.
- Died: August 29, 1948 (aged 70); San Francisco, California, U.S.
- Batted: Right Threw: Right

MLB debut
- April 14, 1906, for the Boston Americans

Last MLB appearance
- May 29, 1906, for the Boston Americans

MLB statistics
- Batting average: .233
- Home runs: 1
- Runs batted in: 12
- Stats at Baseball Reference

Teams
- Boston Americans (1906)

Charles Henry Graham (April 24, 1878 – August 29, 1948), known as "Uncle Charlie", was an American baseball catcher, manager and team owner. Listed at 6 ft 0 in (1.83 m), 190 lb., Graham batted and threw right-handed. He was born in Santa Clara, California.

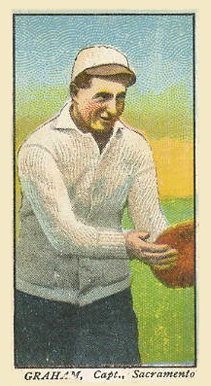
A baseball card depicting Graham

Graham played and coached for Santa Clara College before entering Major League Baseball during the 1906 season with the Boston Americans. In one season career, he was a .233 hitter (21-for-90) with one home run and 12 RBI in 30 games, including 10 runs, one double, and one stolen base. Following his majors career, he played and coached in the minor leagues.

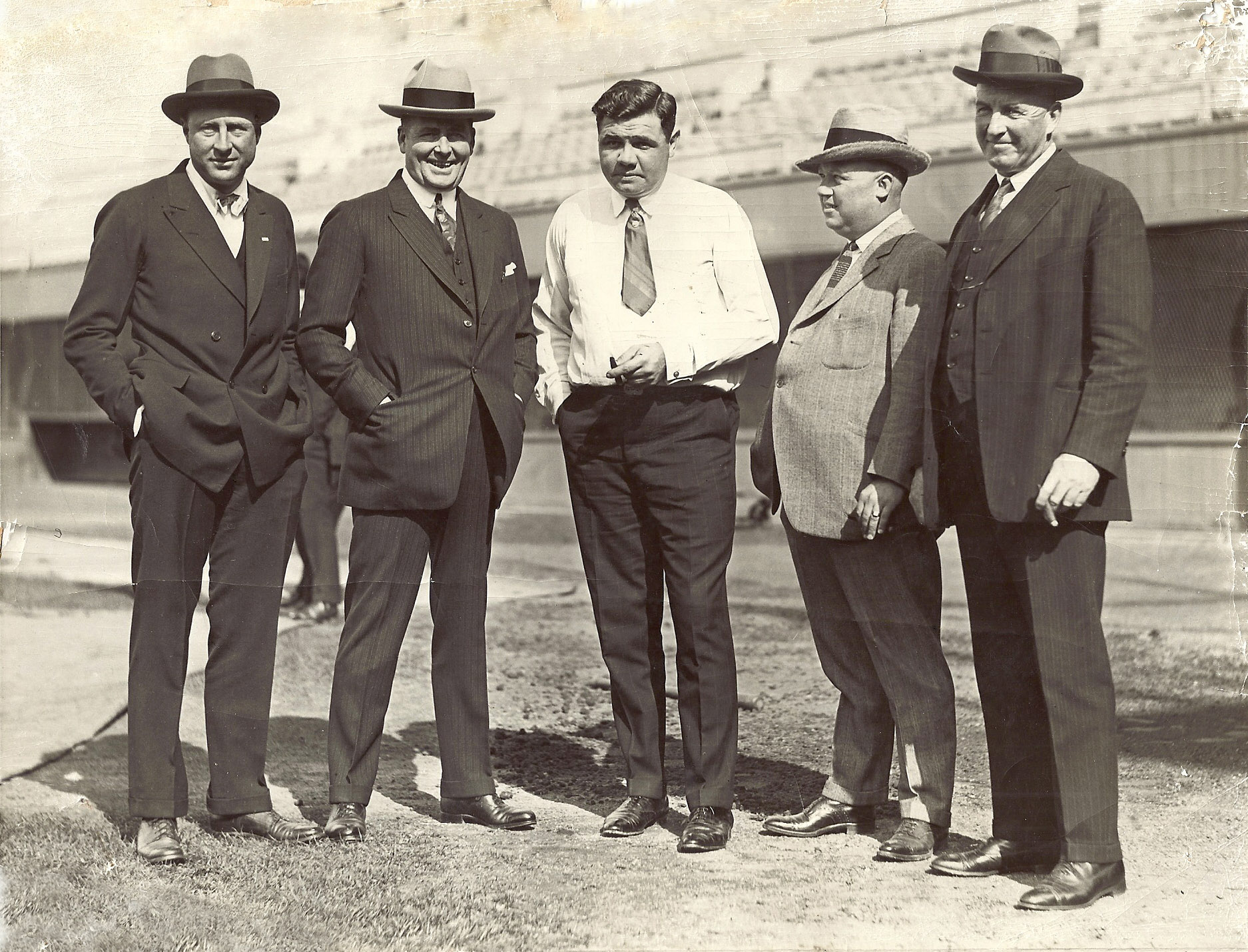
Charles Graham (far right) meets with Babe Ruth (Center), PCL President William McCarthy (2nd from Left), and fellow SF Seal owners Charles H. Strub (far Left) and George Putnam (2nd from Left) at Recreation Park

In 1918, Graham became manager and part owner of the PCL San Francisco Seals. He managed until 1921 and eventually took control of front office. Under his management the Seals moved to their own park, Seals Stadium, in 1931. The Seals won pennants in 1922, 1923, 1925, 1928, 1931, 1935 and 1946, to become one of the most successful teams in PCL history. Their rosters included several future major league stars, such as Earl Averill, Joe DiMaggio, Smead Jolley and Paul Waner, as well as Lefty O'Doul as the team's manager. In 1946 the Seals had a new co-owner, Paul Fagan, who eventually bought the team outright from Graham.

Graham died in San Francisco, California, at age 70. A dormitory at Santa Clara University is named in his honor. One of his sons, Robert A. Graham, joined the Jesuits and became a leading authority on the Vatican's World War II history.
