= Dale Morton =

English rugby league footballer

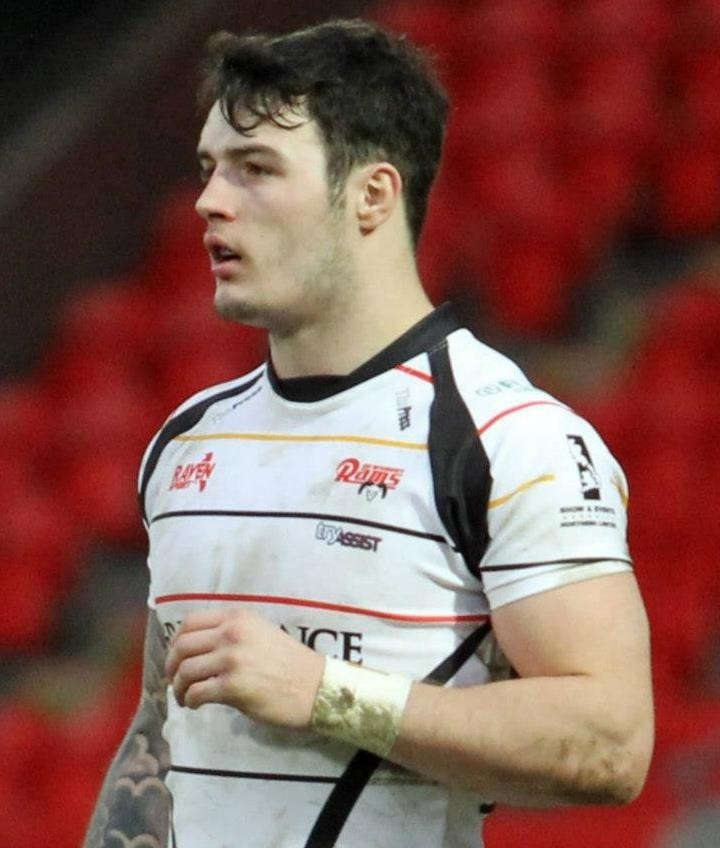

Personal information
- Full name: Dale Morton
- Born: 31 October 1990 (age 35) Pontefract, England

Playing information
- Height: 5 ft 10 in (1.78 m)
- Weight: 14 st 0 lb (89 kg)
- Position: Wing, Fullback
Club
Years	Team	Pld	T	G	FG	P
2009–12	Wakefield Trinity Wildcats	27	9	0	0	36
2013–19	Dewsbury Rams	202	75	36	0	372
2020–24	Batley Bulldogs	19	20	0	0	80
	Total	248	104	36	0	488

Dale Morton (born 31 October 1990) is a former English professional rugby league footballer who played on the wing.

He previously played for the Wakefield Trinity Wildcats in the Super League, and Dewsbury Rams and Batley Bulldogs in the Championship.

== Background ==
Morton was born in Pontefract, West Yorkshire, England.

== Knottingley Rockware and Football ==
Dale Morton played for his local club Knottingley Rockware from the age of 13. He was spotted playing at a young age by Bradford and former Rockware hooker Wayne Godwin. He has also played for the Wakefield Service Area, and the Yorkshire District at Under 14s & 15s level. Morton was on scholarship with Castleford until Wakefield Trinity offered him a contract at the age of 16. Clubs such as Leeds and Bradford Bulls were also interested in signing Morton.

While playing for Knottingley Rockware he helped his team win many trophies such as the Castleford & District Cup 2005. It was during the final of this competition that Dale was spotted playing against Castleford Lock Lane by current Wakefield coach John Kear.

Before the age of 13, Morton played football for local Knottingley team Kellingley Welfare FC. From the age 8 to 13 Dale was watched by professional football clubs such as Leeds United, Huddersfield Town and Barnsley. He then opted to play rugby league with school friends and from that day has been a success in the sport.

== First team appearances ==
His début season came in 2009's Super League XIV where he played 3-games, scoring one try. Morton made his first team début for Wakefield Trinity in a 30-24 win away to Salford in round 23, where he came on off the bench. He then made his first start in a 40-28 win away at Warrington, a game in which he scored a try while playing on the wing. He made his third appearance in a 24-10 win at home to Hull Kingston Rovers in the last round of the regular season. On 3 October 2022, Morton scored a try for Batley in their 44-12 Million Pound Game loss to Leigh.
