= Ed Barber =

English rugby league & union footballer

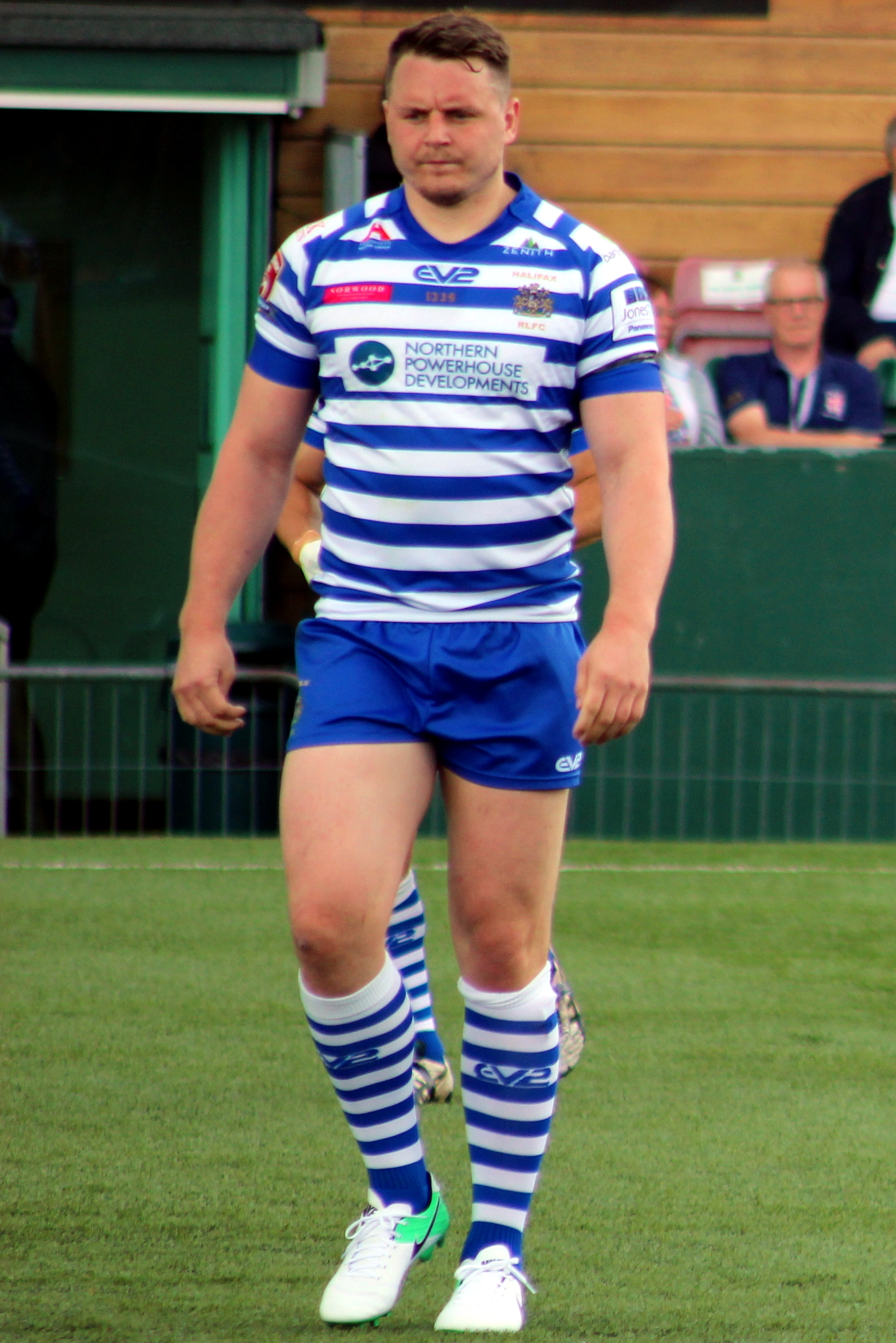

Personal information
- Full name: Edward Barber
- Born: 26 April 1990 (age 35) Halifax, West Yorkshire, England
- Height: 6 ft 2 in (1.87 m)
- Weight: 16 st 1 lb (102 kg)

Playing information

Rugby league
- Position: Second-row, Loose forward, Centre
Club
Years	Team	Pld	T	G	FG	P
2010–12	Dewsbury Rams	20	5	6	0	32
2014	Swinton Lions	13	9	0	0	36
2015–22	Halifax Panthers	146	46	2	0	188
2024	Halifax Panthers	17	8	0	0	32
	Total	196	68	8	0	288

Rugby union
Club
Years	Team	Pld	T	G	FG	P
2022–	Huddersfield
- Source: As of 31 October 2024

Ed Barber (born 26 April 1990) is an English professional rugby union and rugby league, footballer who last played as a centre for Halifax Panthers in the RFL Championship.

== Background ==
Barber was born in Halifax, West Yorkshire, England.

== Career ==
Barber has previously played for the Western Suburbs Rosellas, Dewsbury Rams and the Swinton Lions.

=== Halifax Panthers (rejoin) ===
It was reported that he had rejoined Halifax Panthers in the RFL Championship for the remainder of the 2024 season.

== Controversies ==
On 30 July 2020, Barber posted a tweet about new lockdown restrictions, leading to the RFL asking him for an explanation.
