= James Brown (rugby league) =

English rugby league player

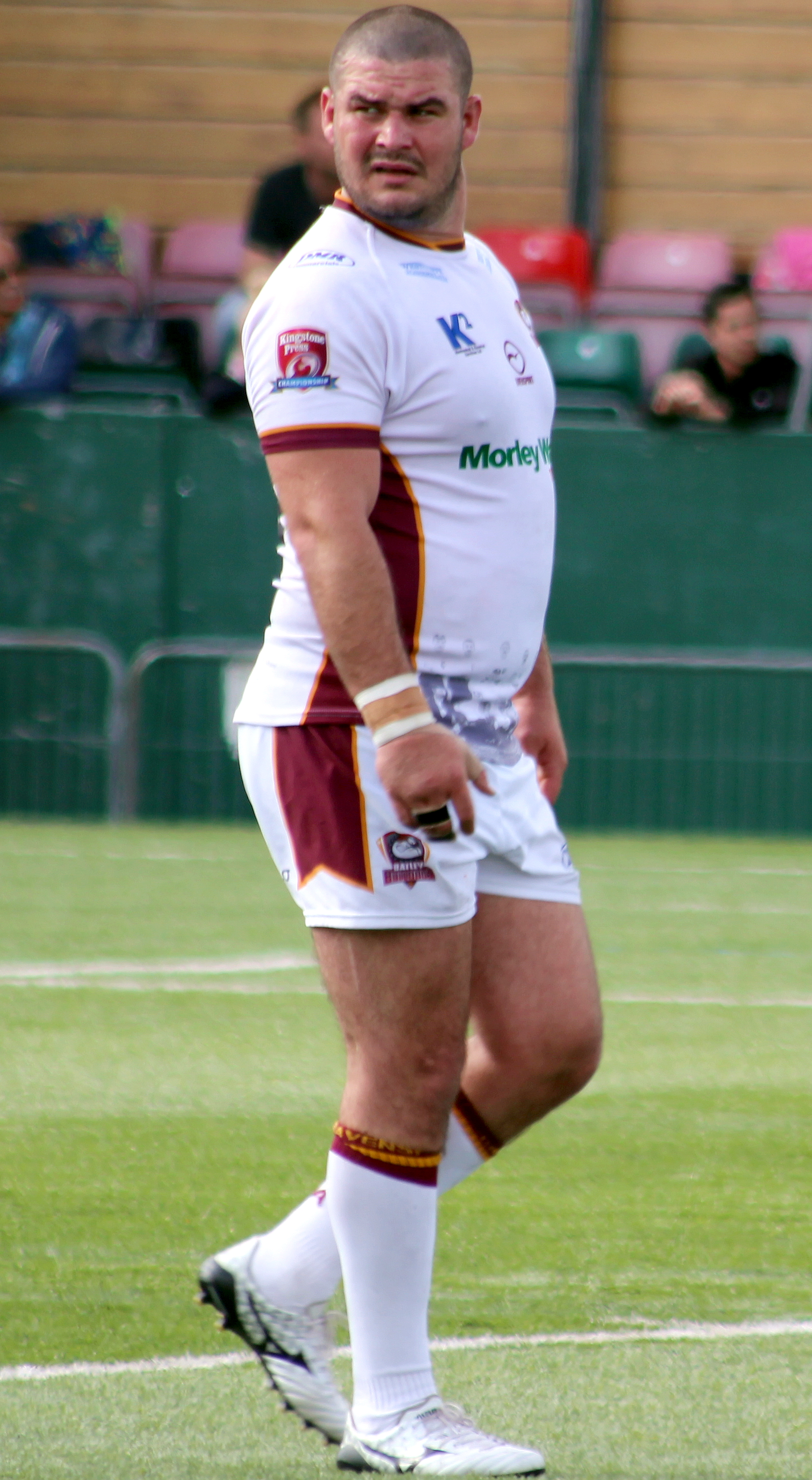

Personal information
- Full name: James Brown
- Born: 6 May 1988 (age 37) England
- Height: 6 ft 2 in (1.87 m)
- Weight: 15 st 4 lb (97 kg)

Playing information
- Position: Prop, Loose forward
Club
Years	Team	Pld	T	G	FG	P
2013–14	Swinton Lions	39	4	0	0	12
2015–25	Batley Bulldogs	227	32	0	0	128
2017(loan)	→ Keighley Cougars	1	0	0	0	0
	Total	267	36	0	0	140
- Source: As of 30 April 2018

James Brown (born 6 May 1988) is an English professional rugby league player who played as a prop and loose-forward.

He has previously played for the Swinton Lions in the Championship. Brown has also spent time on loan from Batley at the Keighley Cougars in League 1.
