= Cole Oakley =

English rugby league footballer (born 2000)

Personal information
- Full name: Cole Oakley
- Born: 25 October 2000 (age 25)
- Height: 6 ft 0 in (183 cm)
- Weight: 15 st 6 lb (98 kg)

Playing information
- Position: Second-row
Club
Years	Team	Pld	T	G	FG	P
2020–21	Warrington Wolves	1	0	0	0	0
2021(loan)	→Newcastle Thunder	10	1	0	0	4
2021(loan)	→Rochdale Hornets	2	0	0	0	0
2022–23	Halifax Panthers	1	0	0	0	0
2022(loan)	→ Dewsbury Rams	1	0	0	0	0
2022(loan)	→ Hunslet RLFC	14	0	0	0	0
2023(loan)	→ North Wales Crusaders	10	2	0	0	8
2023(loan)	→ Keighley Cougars	3	0	0	0	0
2024	Swinton Lions	1	0	0	0	0
2024(loan)	→ North Wales Crusaders	17	2	0	0	8
2025–26	North Wales Crusaders	27	7	0	0	28
2026–	Salford RLFC	0	0	0	0	0
	Total	87	12	0	0	48
- As of 21 September 2026

Cole Oakley (born 25 October 2000) is a professional rugby league footballer who plays as a second-row for Salford RLFC in the RFL League 1.

== Career ==
=== 2020 ===
Oakley made his Super League debut in round 14 of the 2020 Super League season for Warrington against the Salford Red Devils.

=== Newcastle Thunder (loan) ===
On 24 December 2020 it was announced that Oakley would join Newcastle Thunder on loan

=== Rochdale Hornets (loan) ===
On 17 June 2021, it was reported that he had signed for the Rochdale Hornets in the RFL League 1 on loan

=== Halifax Panthers ===
On 8 November 2021, it was reported that he had signed for Halifax in the RFL Championship

=== Swinton Lions ===
On 14 October 2023 it was reported that he had signed for Swinton in the RFL Championship.

=== Salford RLFC ===
On 21 April 2026 it was reported that he had signed for Salford RLFC in the RFL Championship on a 2½-year deal.
