= Adam Gledhill =

British rugby league footballer

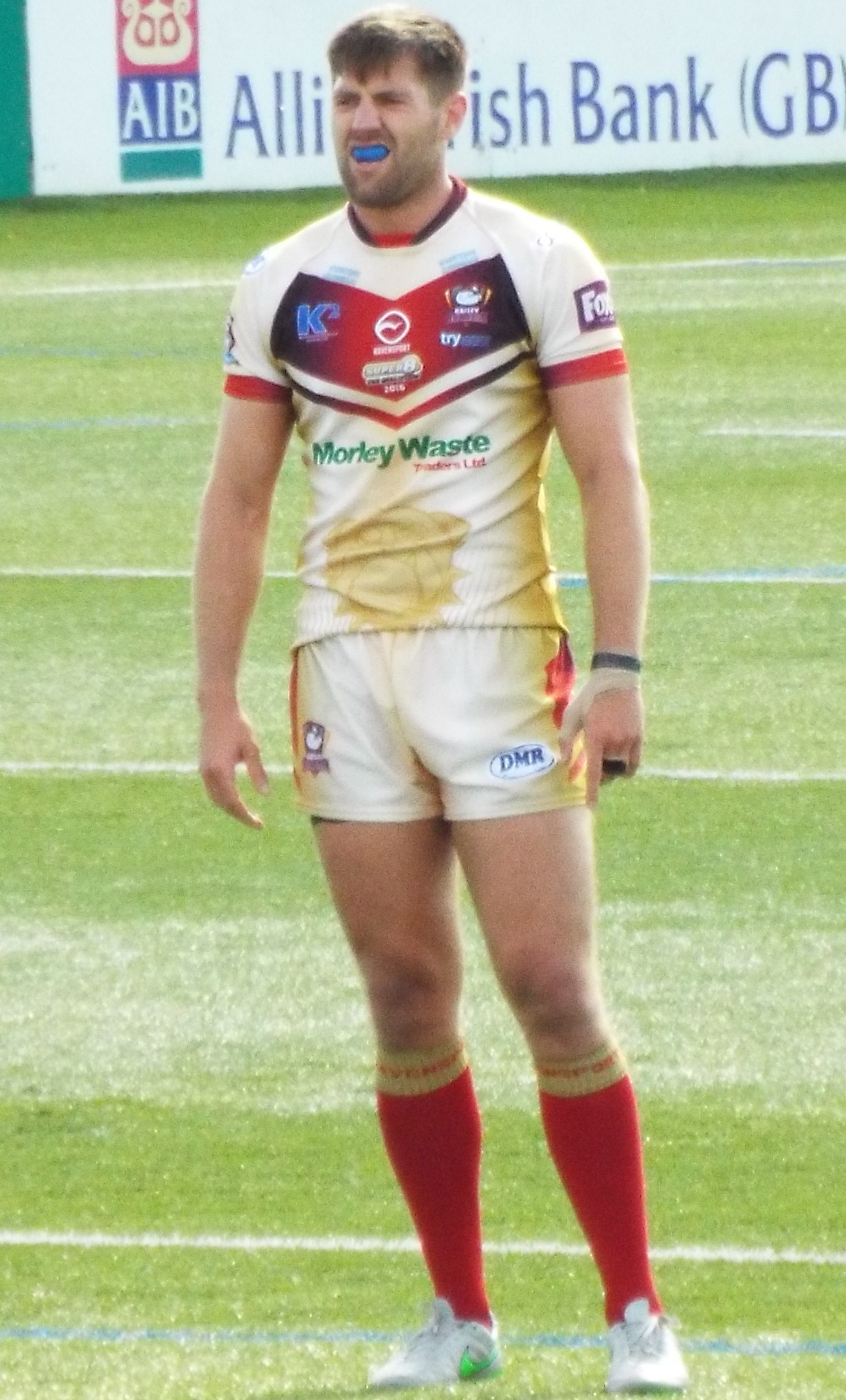

Personal information
- Full name: Adam Gledhill
- Born: 15 February 1993 (age 33)
- Height: 6 ft 4 in (1.92 m)
- Weight: 16 st 3 lb (103 kg)

Playing information
- Position: Loose forward, Prop, Second-row
Club
| Years | Team | Pld | T | G | FG | P |
|---|---|---|---|---|---|---|
| 2014–19 | Batley Bulldogs | 152 | 17 | 0 | 0 | 68 |
| 2021–26 | Batley Bulldogs | 95 | 9 | 0 | 0 | 36 |
| | Total | 247 | 26 | 0 | 0 | 104 |
- Source: As of 10 March 2026

Adam Gledhill (born 15 February 1993) is a former professional rugby league footballer who played as a prop, second-row or loose forward.

Gledhill has previously been in the systems of the Wakefield Trinity Wildcats in the Super League and played for the Gold Coast Titans reserve-grade side. Gledhill scored a try for Batley in their 44-12 Million Pound Game loss to Leigh.

On 22 January 2026 he announced his retirement
