= William Calcott =

English rugby league player

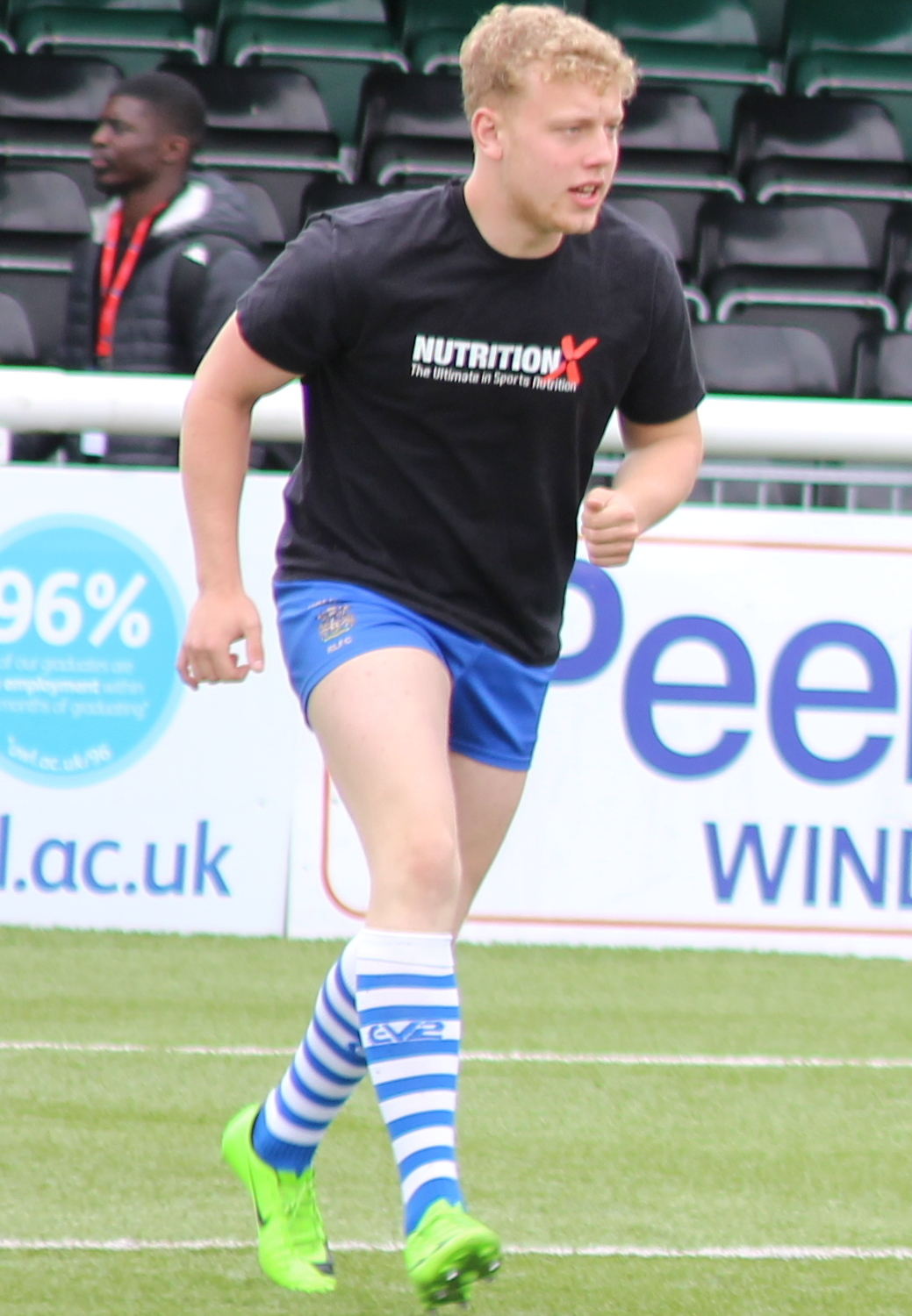

Personal information
- Full name: William Calcott
- Born: 16 December 1997 (age 28) Halifax, West Yorkshire, England
- Height: 6 ft 2 in (1.88 m)
- Weight: 16 st 3 lb (103 kg)

Playing information
- Position: Second-row
Club
Years	Team	Pld	T	G	FG	P
2017–	Halifax Panthers	109	4	0	0	12
2017(loan)	→ South Wales Ironmen	4	1	0	0	4
2018(loan)	→ Rochdale Hornets	2	0	0	0	0
2019(loan)	→ Hunslet RLFC	1	0	0	0	0
	Total	116	5	0	0	16
- Source: As of 4 September 2026

William Calcott (born 16 December 1997) is a professional rugby league footballer who plays as a second-row for Halifax Panthers in the Championship.

Calcott was born in Halifax, West Yorkshire and played for local amateur sides Siddal and Illingworth. In the 2017 season, Calcott spent four weeks on loan at South Wales Ironmen before making his Halifax début in 2017 Super League Qualifiers.
