= Lachlan Walmsley =

Scotland international rugby league footballer

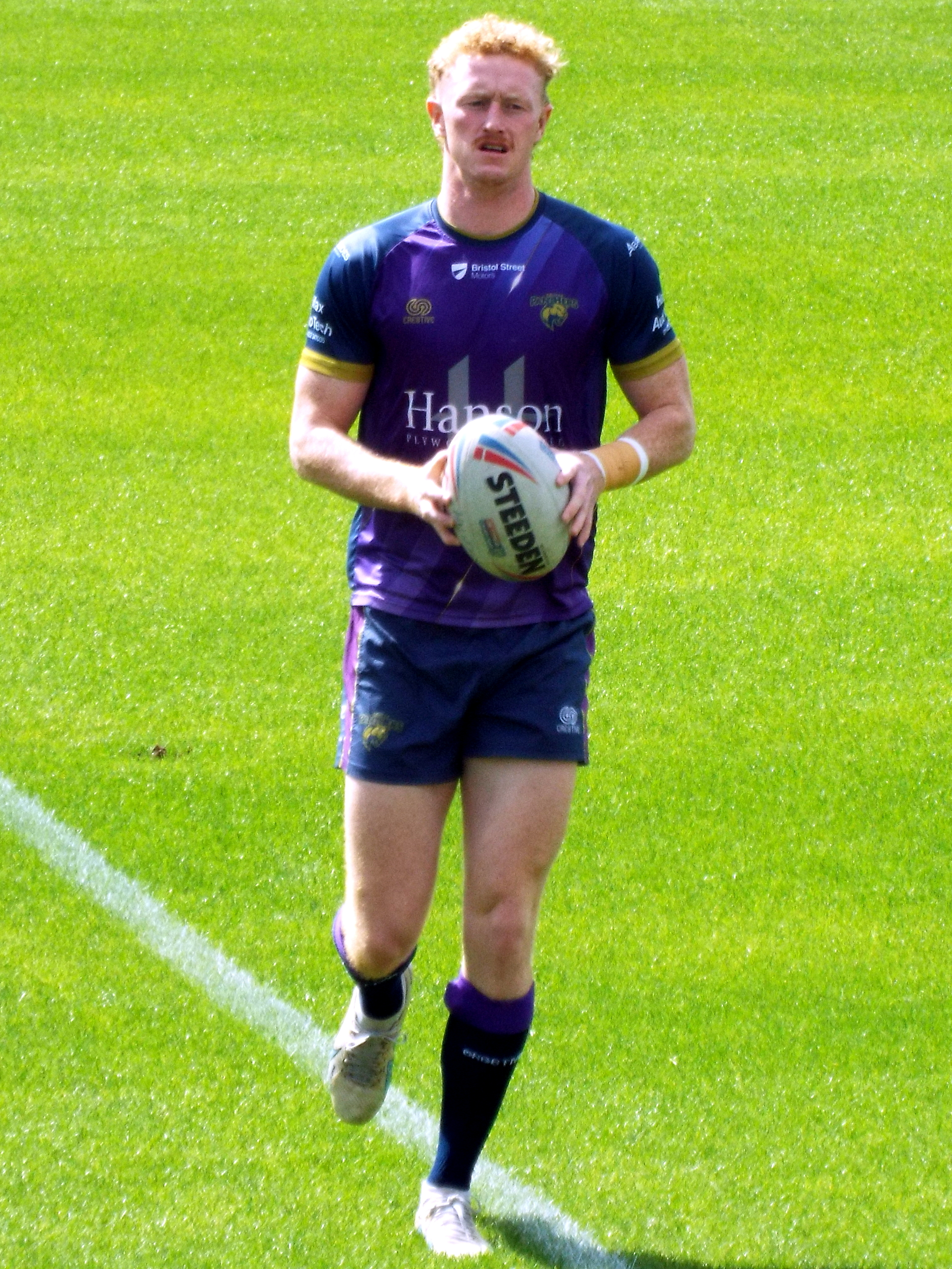

Personal information
- Full name: Lachlan Walmsley
- Born: 12 June 1998 (age 28) Merriwa, New South Wales, Australia
- Height: 6 ft 3 in (1.90 m)
- Weight: 14 st 2 lb (90 kg)

Playing information
- Position: Wing, Fullback
Club
Years	Team	Pld	T	G	FG	P
2021	Whitehaven	23	15	75	1	211
2022–23	Halifax Panthers	54	68	5	0	282
2024–26	Wakefield Trinity	51	42	2	0	170
2027–	Bradford Bulls	0	0	0	0	0
	Total	128	125	82	1	663
Representative
Years	Team	Pld	T	G	FG	P
2021–	Scotland	4	2	5	0	18
- Source: As of 12 November 2026

Lachlan Walmsley (born 12 June 1998) is a Scotland international rugby league footballer who plays as a winger and fullback for Bradford Bulls in the Super League.

He previously played for Halifax in the 2022 RFL Championship and Whitehaven in League 1.

== Background ==
Walmsley was born in Merriwa, New South Wales, Australia. He is of Scottish descent.

== Playing career ==
=== Club career ===
He came through the youth system at the Newcastle Knights and reserve grade for the South Sydney Rabbitohs, and played for New South Wales under 18s in the State of Origin at youth level.

=== Whitehaven RLFC ===
Walmsley was the top point scorer for Whitehaven in their 2021 season.

=== Halifax Panthers ===
He joined Halifax ahead of the 2022 season and was the top try-scorer for the Panthers in their 2022 season and named (jointly with Dean Parata) as the 2023 Championship Player of the Year at the RFL annual awards.

=== Wakefield Trinity ===
On 7 November 2023, it was reported that he had signed for Wakefield Trinity in the RFL Championship on a two-year deal.

On 9 July 2025, Walmsley signed a new one-year contract extension with Wakefield Trinity to remain at the club through the end of the 2026 season. On 3 October 2026, he played in Wakefield Trinity's 23-10 victory over Warrington in the 2026 Super League Grand Final. It was the clubs first major trophy in 58 years.

=== Bradford Bulls ===
On 6 October 2026 it was reported that he had signed for Bradford on a two-year deal.

=== International career ===
In 2021 Walmsley made his international début for Scotland against Jamaica.

In 2022 Walmsley was named in the Scotland squad for the 2021 Rugby League World Cup, scoring his first try for Scotland in the 28-4 defeat to Italy on 16 October 2022.
