= Louis Jouffret =

France international rugby league player (1995-)

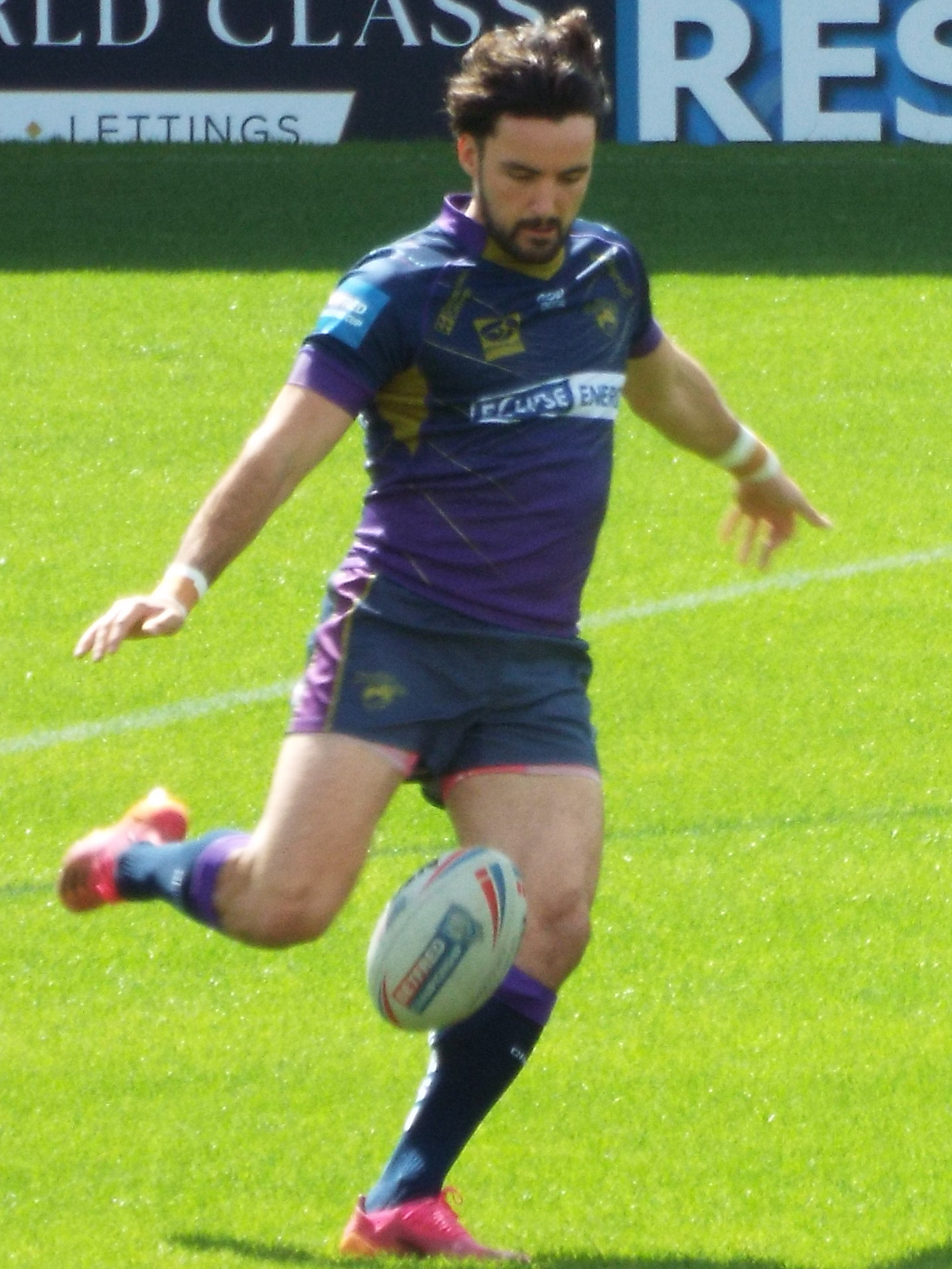

Personal information
- Full name: Louis Jouffret
- Born: 24 August 1995 (age 31) Avignon, Vaucluse, Provence-Alpes-Côte d'Azur, France
- Height: 5 ft 10 in (1.79 m)
- Weight: 13 st 8 lb (86 kg)

Playing information
- Position: Stand-off, Scrum-half, Fullback
Club
| Years | Team | Pld | T | G | FG | P |
|---|---|---|---|---|---|---|
| 2015–16 | Whitehaven | 35 | 7 | 81 | 0 | 190 |
| 2017 | Toulouse Olympique | 6 | 2 | 0 | 0 | 8 |
| 2018–19 | Batley Bulldogs | 37 | 17 | 42 | 1 | 153 |
| 2020–20 | Featherstone Rovers | 5 | 2 | 0 | 0 | 4 |
| 2021 | SO Avignon | 14 | 14 | 1 | | 58 |
| 2021 | Whitehaven | 8 | 8 | 6 | 0 | 24 |
| 2022–25 | Halifax Panthers | 111 | 41 | 229 | 1 | 623 |
| 2025– | SO Avignon | 15 | 6 | 6 | 0 | 36 |
| | Total | 231 | 97 | 365 | 2 | 1096 |
Representative
| Years | Team | Pld | T | G | FG | P |
| 2022– | France | 3 | 2 | 0 | 0 | 8 |
- Source: As of 4 September 2026

Louis Jouffret (born 24 August 1995) is a French professional rugby league footballer who plays as a stand-off for SO Avignon in the Super XIII and France at international level.

== Playing career ==
He previously played for English clubs Halifax Panthers, Batley, Featherstone Rovers, Whitehaven RLFC and French club Toulouse Olympique.

=== Ottawa Aces ===
He had signed with the Ottawa Aces before COVID-19 delayed their entry to League One until 2022.

=== SO Avignon ===
He signed for SO Avignon for the 2021 season.

=== Whitehaven R.L.F.C. ===
On 26 June 2021, it was reported that he had signed for Whitehaven R.L.F.C. in the RFL Championship.

=== Halifax Panthers ===
On 6 November 2021, it was reported that he had signed for Halifax in the RFL Championship. In August 2023, Halifax defeated Batley Bulldogs 12–10 in the final of the 2023 RFL 1895 Cup. Jouffret kicked eight of Halifax's points and received the Ray French Award as the player of the match.
