= Brandon Moore (rugby league) =

English professional rugby league footballer

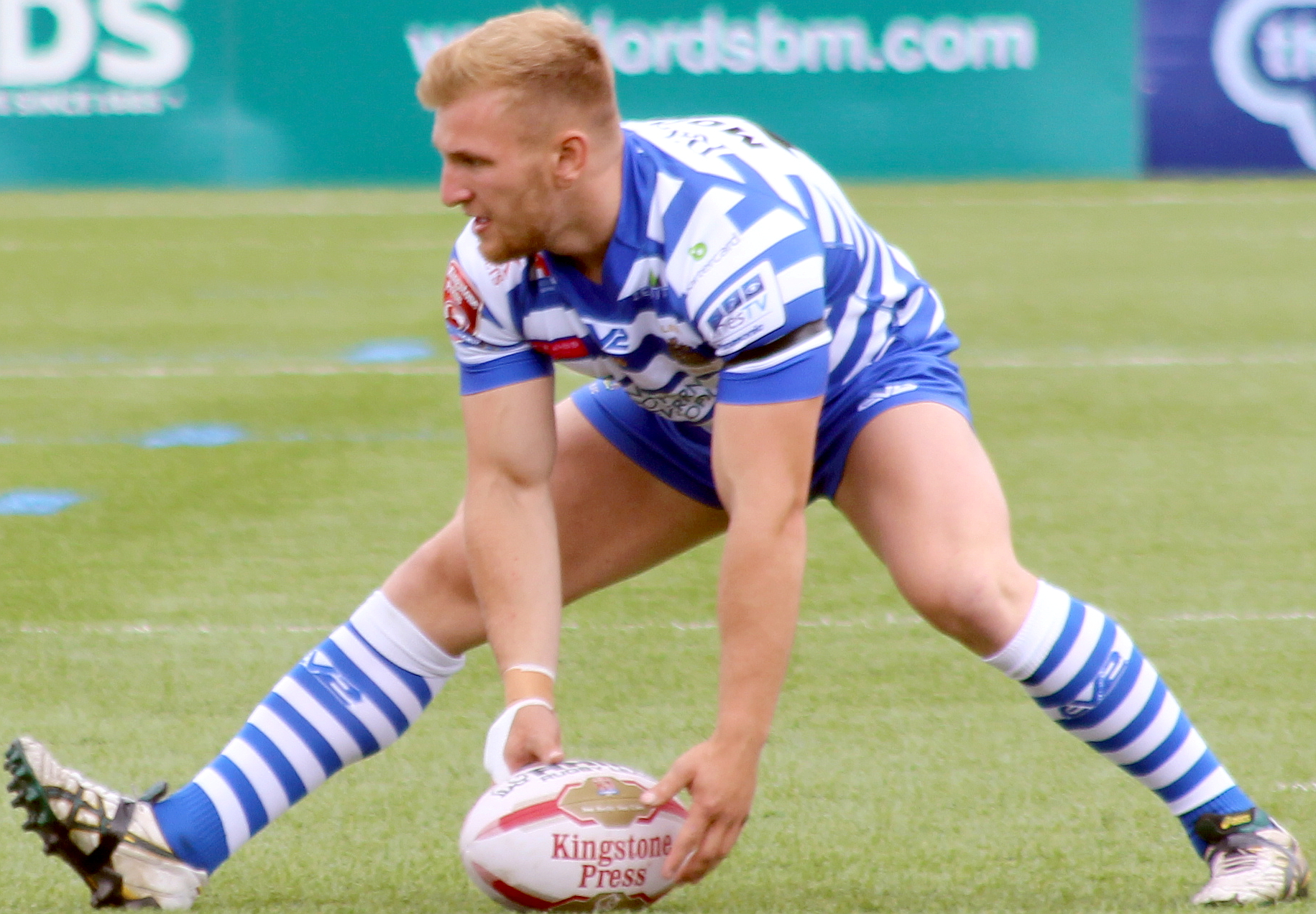

Personal information
- Full name: Brandon Moore
- Born: 27 July 1996 (age 30) Maryport, Cumbria, England
- Height: 5 ft 8 in (1.72 m)
- Weight: 13 st 10 lb (87 kg)

Playing information
- Position: Hooker
Club
| Years | Team | Pld | T | G | FG | P |
|---|---|---|---|---|---|---|
| 2016–23 | Halifax | 188 | 33 | 0 | 0 | 132 |
| 2020(loan) | → Huddersfield Giants | 4 | 0 | 0 | 0 | 0 |
| 2024–25 | Batley Bulldogs | 58 | 6 | 0 | 0 | 20 |
| 2026– | Midlands Hurricanes | 0 | 0 | 0 | 0 | 0 |
| | Total | 250 | 39 | 0 | 0 | 152 |
- Source: As of 4 September 2026

Brandon Moore (born 27 July 1996) is an English professional rugby league footballer who plays as a hooker for the Midlands Hurricanes in the Championship.

== Background ==
Moore was born in Maryport, Cumbria, England.

== Career ==
=== Halifax RLFC ===
Moore joined Halifax in 2016.

=== Huddersfield (loan) ===
In September 2020, he joined Huddersfield on loan until the end of the season.

=== Batley ===
On 12 January 2024 it was reported that he had signed for Batley in the RFL Championship.

=== Midlands Hurricanes ===
On 19 October 2025 it was reported that he had signed for Midlands Hurricanes in the RFL Championship.
