= Joe Keyes (rugby league) =

Ireland international rugby league footballer

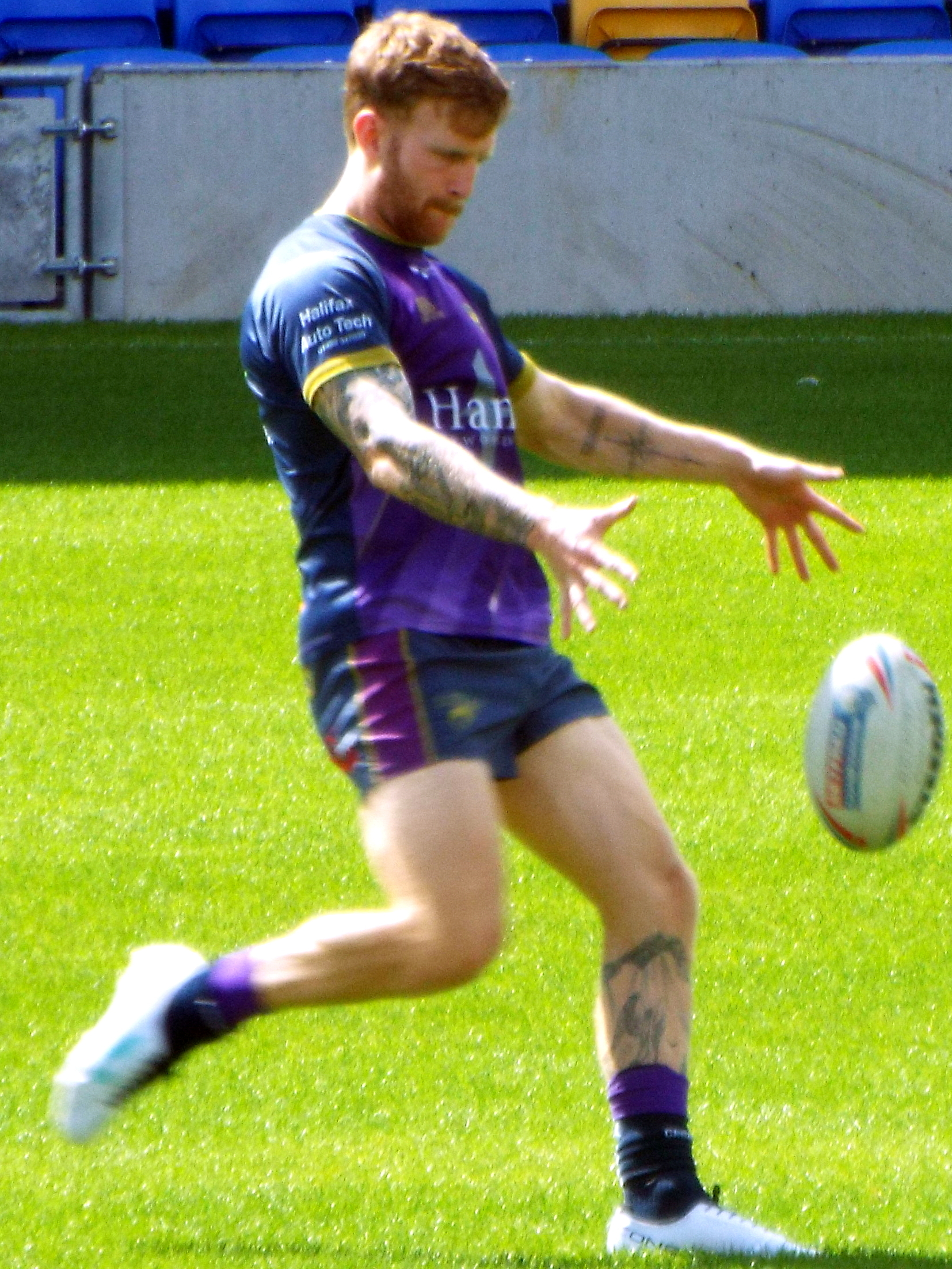

Personal information
- Full name: Joseph Keyes
- Born: 17 September 1995 (age 31) Enfield, London, England
- Height: 5 ft 10 in (1.79 m)
- Weight: 13 st 12 lb (88 kg)

Playing information
- Position: Scrum-half, Stand-off
Club
Years	Team	Pld	T	G	FG	P
2014–16	London Broncos	28	8	3	0	38
2016(loan)	→ London Skolars	1	0	0	0	0
2016–19	Bradford Bulls	72	24	168	2	434
2020–21	Hull Kingston Rovers	6	1	6	0	16
2021(loan)	→ York City Knights	1	0	0	0	0
2021(loan)	→ Bradford Bulls	3	3	18	0	48
2022–24	Halifax Panthers	76	31	153	1	431
2025–26	Bradford Bulls	28	6	4	1	33
2026–	Sporting Olympique Avignon	0	0	0	0	0
	Total	215	73	352	4	1000
Representative
Years	Team	Pld	T	G	FG	P
2015–	Ireland	11	3	3	1	19
- Source: As of 31 October 2024

Joseph Keyes (born 17 September 1995) is an Ireland international rugby league footballer who plays as a scrum-half and stand-off for Sporting Olympique Avignon in the Super XIII.

He has previously played for the London Broncos and the Bradford Bulls in the Super League and Championship, and spent time on loan from the Broncos at the London Skolars in League 1. Keyes also played for Bradford Bulls in the third tier and Hull Kingston Rovers in the Super League. He spent time on loan from Hull KR at Bradford and the York City Knights, as well as a stint at Halifax Panthers in the second tier.

== Background ==
Keyes was born in Enfield, London, England and is the son of London Broncos player welfare manager John Keyes. He played his youth rugby league at Brentwood Eels RLFC, before joining London Broncos Academy.

== Playing career ==
=== London Broncos ===
Keyes made his début for the London Broncos in the Super League against the Widnes Vikings in 2014.

The Ireland international played 28 games for the London Broncos, with about seven appearances in the Super League with the rest in the Championship between 2014 and 2016 before asking for a release.

=== London Skolars (DR) ===
Keyes spent time on dual registration in 2016 at the London Skolars.

=== Bradford Bulls ===
2016 - 2016 Season Keyes featured in the Championship Shield in Game 3 against Oldham and then to Game 6 against Workington Town

Following the Bradford clubs liquidation at the end of the season, Keyes re-signed with the new Bradford side.

2017 - 2017 Season Keyes featured in the pre-season friendlies against Huddersfield and Keighley.

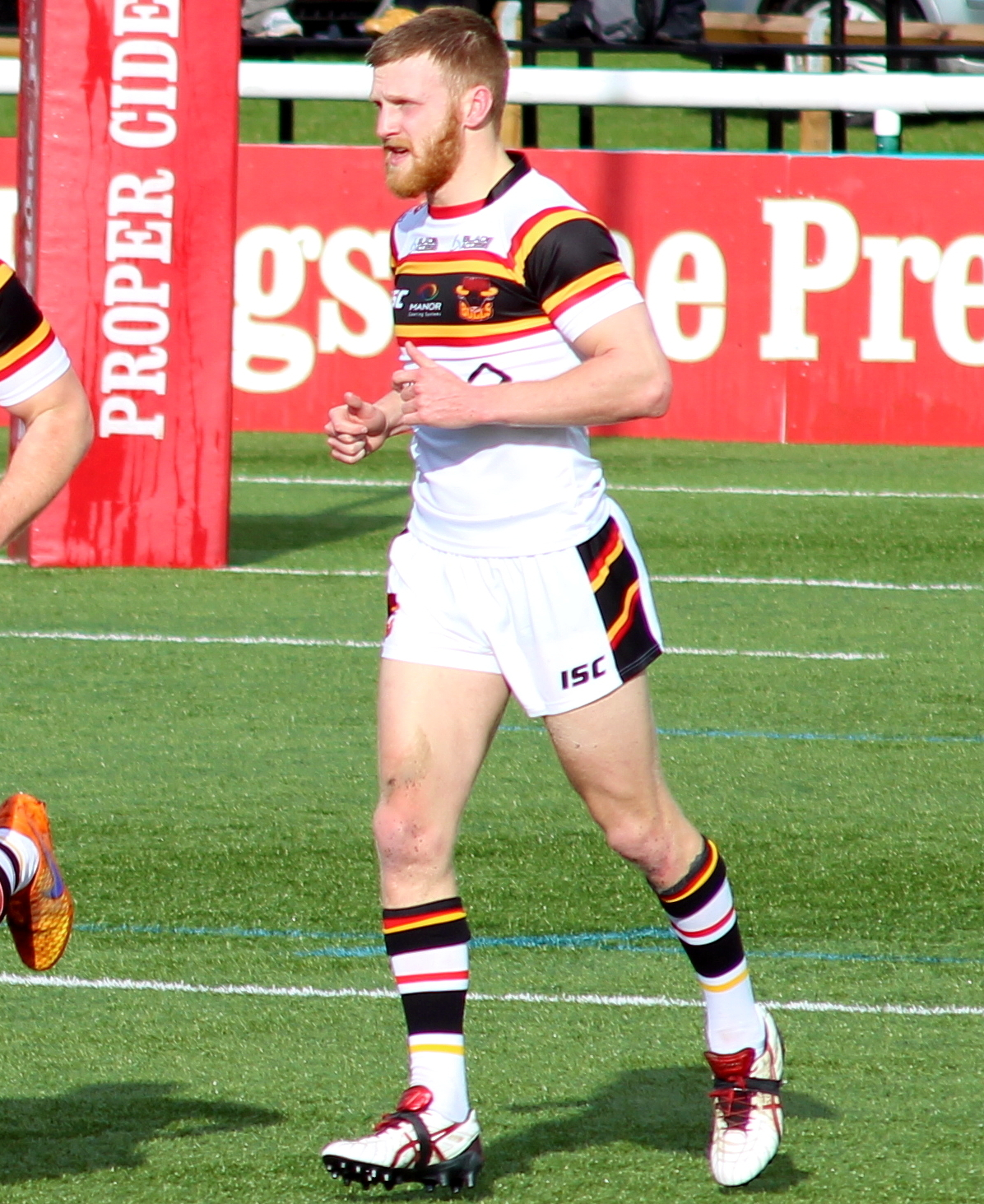
Keyes playing for the Bradford Bulls in 2017

Keyes featured in round 3 the Swinton Lions and then in round 5 against the London Broncos. He also played in round 7 against Dewsbury to round 11 against Featherstone then in round 13 Sheffield to round 16 against Dewsbury. He played in round 18 Rochdale to round 23 against the Swinton Lions. Keyes featured in the Championship Shield Game 1 Toulouse Olympique to Game 2 Oldham then in Game 5 Sheffield Eagles to Game 7 Rochdale. Keyes also played in the 2017 Challenge Cup in round 4 against Featherstone. He signed a two-year extension with the Bradford side at the end of the season.

2018 - 2018 Season

After recovering from a knee injury sustained at the 2017 Rugby League World Cup, Keyes featured in the pre season friendly against Dewsbury and the Keighley Cougars. Keyes featured in round 1 against York to round 8 against Doncaster then in round 12 North Wales Crusaders to round 18 against York. He played in round 21 against the North Wales Crusaders to round 25 Oldham R.L.F.C. then in the Semi Final against the same opponent to Final Workington Town. Keyes played in the 2018 Challenge Cup in round 3 West Wales Raiders then in Round 5 against Warrington.

At the end of the season Keyes signed a two-year extension with the Bradford club.

2019 - 2019 Season

Keyes featured in the pre-season friendlies against Halifax R.L.F.C. and Dewsbury. Keyes played in round 18 Halifax R.L.F.C. to round 27 against Rochdale.

=== York City Knights (loan) ===
On 14 April 2021 it was reported that he had signed for the York City Knights in the RFL Championship on a short-term loan deal.

=== Bradford Bulls (loan) ===
On 26 June 2021, it was reported that he had signed for Bradford in the RFL Championship on loan.

2021 - 2021 Season

Keyes played in Round 12 against Batley to Round 14 Featherstone Rovers.

=== Halifax Panthers ===
On 14 October 2021 it was reported that he had signed for Halifax in the RFL Championship.

On 17 July 2022, Keyes scored four tries and kicked nine goals in Halifax's 58-10 victory over Workington Town.

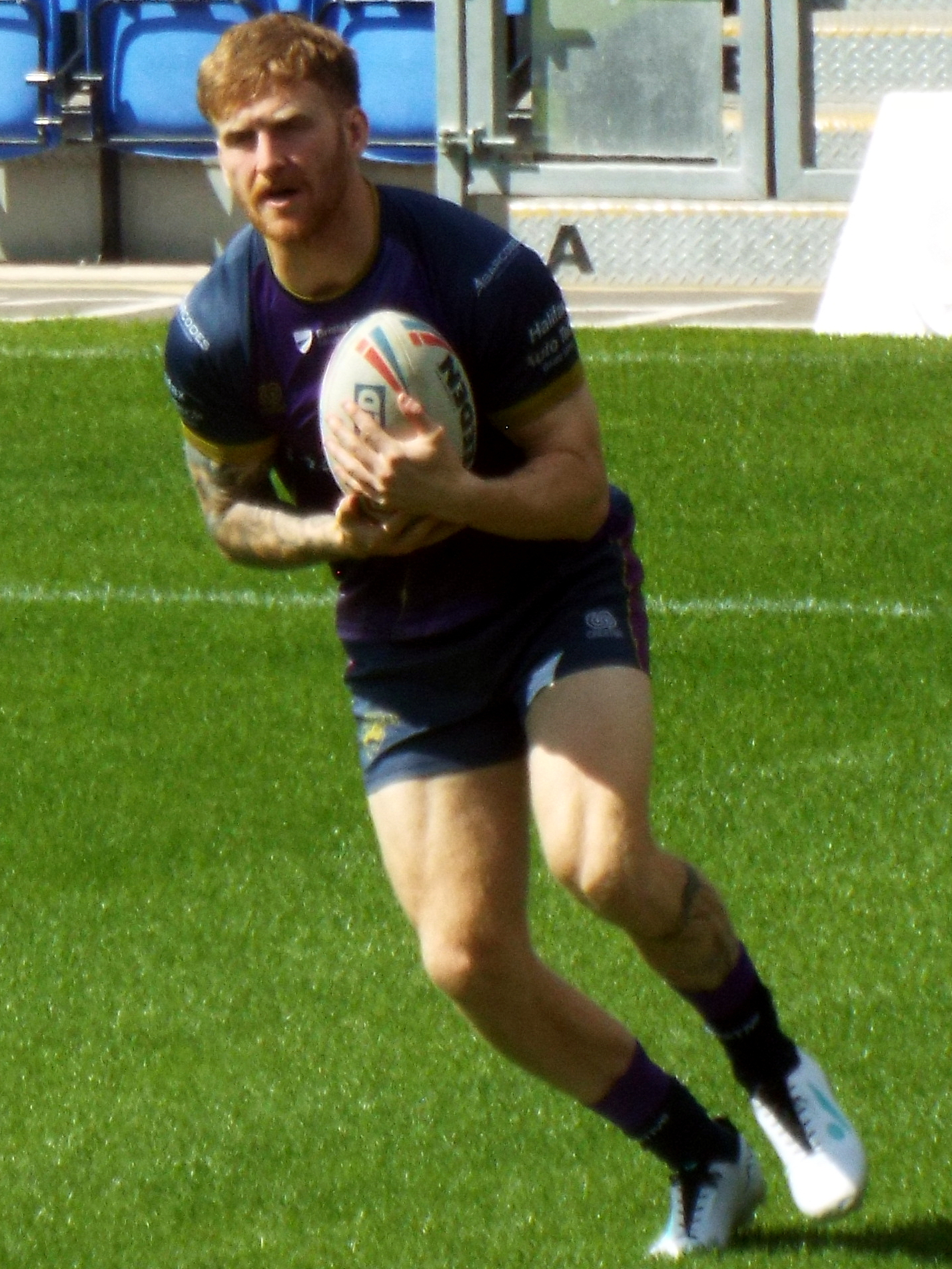
Keyes playing for the Halifax Panthers in 2023

=== Bradford Bulls (re-join) ===
On 4 July 2024 it was reported that he had signed for Bradford in the RFL Championship on a two-year deal.

== Statistics ==
Statistics do not include pre-season friendlies.

Season	Appearance	Tries	Goals	F/G	Points
2016 Bradford Bulls	4	1	22	0	48
2017 Bradford Bulls	23	3	9	1	31
2018 Bradford Bulls	23	12	82	1	213
2019 Bradford Bulls	10	8	52	0	136
2021 Bradford Bulls	3	3	18	0	48
Total	63	27	183	2	476

== Ireland ==
Keyes made his representative début for Ireland in the 2015 European Cup. He went on to make three appearances in the tournament.

In 2016 he was called up to the Ireland squad for the 2017 Rugby League World Cup European Pool B qualifiers.

He featured against Spain and Russia in Ireland's route to the World Cup.
