= James Woodburn-Hall =

Jamaica international rugby league footballer

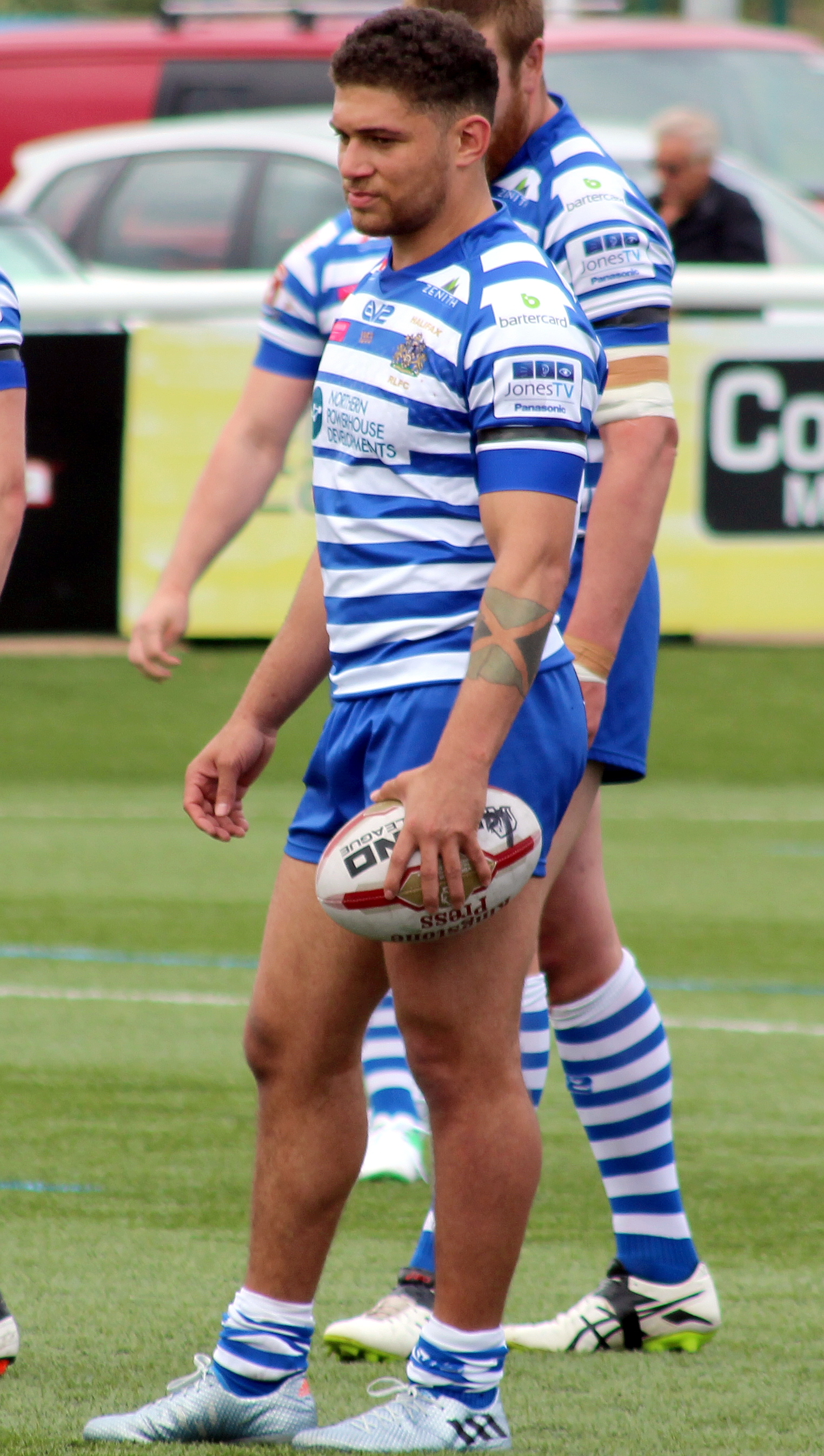

Personal information
- Full name: James Woodburn-Hall
- Born: 2 February 1995 (age 31) Isleworth, London, England
- Height: 5 ft 11 in (1.80 m)
- Weight: 13 st 6 lb (85 kg)

Playing information
- Position: Scrum-half, Stand-off, Centre
Club
| Years | Team | Pld | T | G | FG | P |
|---|---|---|---|---|---|---|
| 2013–14 | London Broncos | 13 | 2 | 0 | 8 | 0 |
| 2014(loan) | → London Skolars | 2 | 4 | 0 | 0 | 16 |
| 2015 | Hemel Stags | 14 | 4 | 3 | 0 | 20 |
| 2016 | London Skolars | 3 | 1 | 0 | 0 | 4 |
| 2016–25 | Halifax Panthers | 141 | 63 | 5 | 2 | 264 |
| 2019(loan) | → Hunslet | 2 | 1 | 0 | 0 | 4 |
| 2025–26 | SO Avignon | 12 | 7 | 0 | 1 | 29 |
| 2026– | Midlands Hurricanes | 0 | 0 | 0 | 0 | 0 |
| | Total | 187 | 82 | 8 | 11 | 337 |
Representative
| Years | Team | Pld | T | G | FG | P |
| 2019– | Jamaica | 6 | 0 | 1 | 0 | 2 |
- Source: As of 4 September 2026

James Woodburn-Hall (born 2 February 1995) is a Jamaica international rugby league footballer who plays as a centre, stand-off or scrum-half for the Midlands Hurricanes in the Championship.

== Background ==
Woodburn-Hall was born in Isleworth, London, England.

== Career ==
Woodburn-Hall has previously played for the London Broncos in the Super League, spent time on loan at London Skolars and Hemel Stags in League 1, before spending nine years at Halifax in the Championship and then one season at SO Avignon in the Super XIII.

=== Midlands Hurricanes ===
On 29 May 2026 it was reported that he had signed for Midlands Hurricanes in the RFL Championship

== International career ==
Woodburn-Hall made his debut for Jamaica on 17 November 2018 against the United States. Woodburn-Hall represented Jamaica at the 2021 Rugby League World Cup playing in all three games.
