= James Saltonstall =

Italy international rugby league footballer (born 1993)

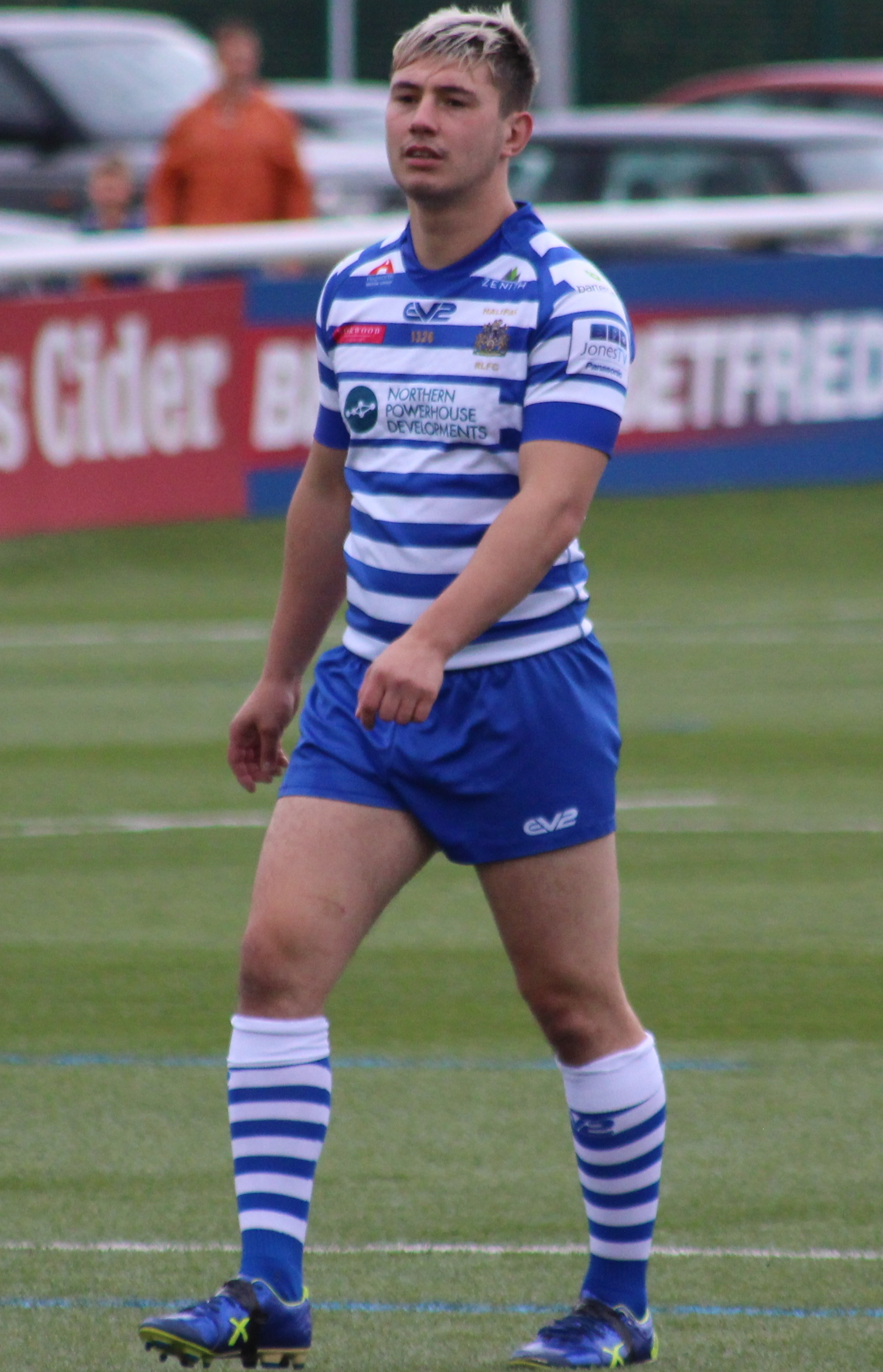

Personal information
- Full name: James Mark Saltonstall
- Born: 27 September 1993 (age 32) Halifax, West Yorkshire, England
- Height: 6 ft 0 in (1.82 m)
- Weight: 13 st 5 lb (85 kg)

Playing information
- Position: Wing, Fullback
Club
| Years | Team | Pld | T | G | FG | P |
|---|---|---|---|---|---|---|
| 2013–14 | Warrington Wolves | 0 | 0 | 0 | 0 | 0 |
| 2014(loan) | → Bradford Bulls | 0 | 0 | 0 | 0 | 0 |
| 2014(loan) | → York City Knights | 18 | 9 | 0 | 0 | 36 |
| 2015–25 | Halifax | 254 | 114 | 1 | 0 | 458 |
| 2019(loan) | → Hunslet | 1 | 2 | 0 | 0 | 8 |
| | Total | 273 | 125 | 1 | 0 | 502 |
Representative
| Years | Team | Pld | T | G | FG | P |
| 2013 | Italy | 3 | 2 | 0 | 0 | 8 |
- Source: As of 15 October 2025

James Saltonstall (born 27 September 1993) is a former Italian international rugby league footballer who last played on the wing or as a fullback for Halifax (UK) in the Championship.

He represented Italy in the 2013 World Cup.

== Background ==
Saltonstall was born in Halifax, West Yorkshire, England.

== Playing career ==
He previously played for Warrington in the Super League on the wing.

He made his Italy début in a match against Russia, qualifying through his Italian mother. He was sent on a month's loan to the Super League side Bradford in January 2014. He played in the pre-season games against Hull FC, Dewsbury and Castleford. He scored a try against Dewsbury. In 2015, he signed for Halifax. On 7 August 2022, Saltonstall scored four tries for Halifax in a 34–18 victory over Batley.

On 23 September 2025 he announced his retirement after 11 years with Halifax Panthers
