= Matty Gee =

English rugby league footballer

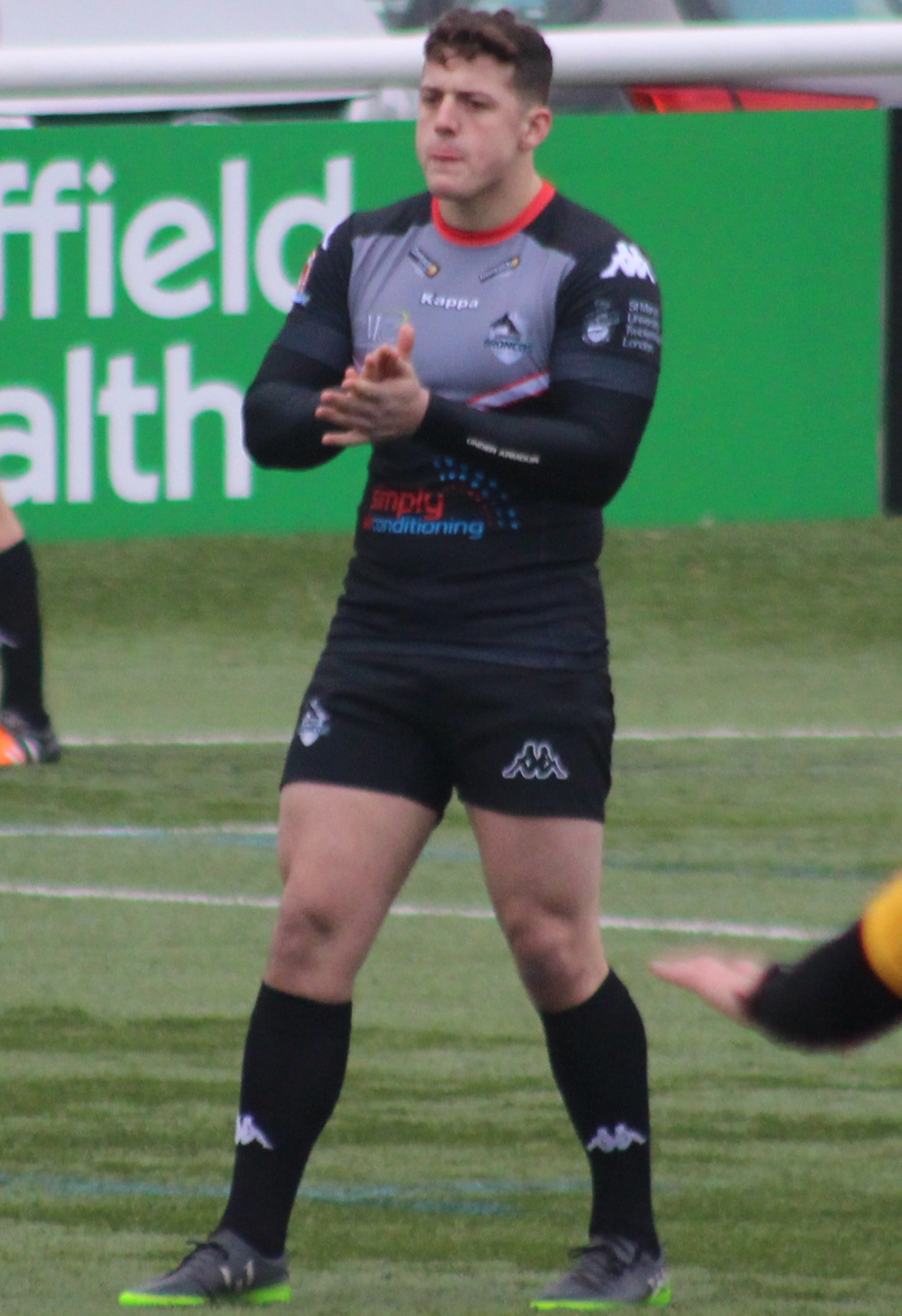

Personal information
- Full name: Matthew Gee
- Born: 12 December 1994 (age 31) Wigan, Greater Manchester, England

Playing information
- Height: 5 ft 11 in (1.80 m)
- Weight: 16 st 1 lb (102 kg)
- Position: Second-row
Club
Years	Team	Pld	T	G	FG	P
2015–16	Salford Red Devils	2	0	0	0	0
2014(loan)	→ N Wales Crusaders	6	0	0	0	0
2015(loan)	→ Hunslet Hawks	13	4	0	0	16
2016(loan)	→ N Wales Crusaders	4	0	0	0	0
2016(loan)	→ Workington Town	19	4	0	0	16
2017–19	London Broncos	70	13	0	0	52
2017(loan)	→ London Skolars	1	0	0	0	0
2020	Hull Kingston Rovers	13	0	0	0	0
2020(loan)	→ Dewsbury Rams	1	1	0	0	4
2021	Leigh Centurions	7	1	0	0	4
2022–24	Halifax Panthers	17	3	0	0	12
2025	Bradford Bulls	27	6	0	0	24
	Total	180	32	0	0	128

Matty Gee (born 12 December 1994) is an English professional rugby league footballer who last played as a second-row forward for the Bradford Bulls in the RFL Championship.

He has played for the Salford Red Devils in the Super League, and on loan from Salford at the North Wales Crusaders in League 1, and the Hunslet Hawks and Workington Town in the Championship. Gee has played for the London Broncos in the Championship and the Super League, and on loan from the Broncos at the London Skolars in League 1. He has also played for Hull Kingston Rovers in the top flight.

== Background ==
Gee was born in Wigan, Greater Manchester, England.

== Playing career ==
=== Salford Red Devils ===
Gee played for the Red Devils in the Super League.

In 2014 he was loaned to North Wales in League 1.

In 2015 he was loaned to Hunslet in the Championship.

In 2016 he was loaned to the Crusaders in League 1. Later in 2016 he was loaned to Workington in the Championship.

=== London Broncos ===
Gee played for the London Broncos in the Championship and the top flight, and spent time on loan from the Broncos at the London Skolars in League 1.

=== Hull Kingston Rovers ===
After London's final-day points difference relegation from the Super League, Gee left the capital and moved to Hull KR ahead of the 2020 Super League season.

=== Leigh Centurions ===
On 6 October 2020 it was announced that Gee would join the Leigh Centurions for the 2021 season.

=== Halifax Panthers ===
On 1 November 2021, it was reported that he had signed for Halifax in the RFL Championship.

=== Bradford Bulls ===
On 9 Aug 2024 it was reported that he had signed for Bradford Bulls in the RFL Championship on a 2-year deal.

In October 2025 it was reported that he had retired.
