= 2024 Bradford Bulls season =

- Championship Rank: N/A
- Challenge Cup: 4th Round
- 2024 record: Wins: 18; draws: 2; losses: 9
- Points scored: For: 767; against: 461

Team information
- Chairman: Nigel Wood
- Head Coach: Eamon O'Carroll
- Captain: Michael Lawrence
- Stadium: Odsal Stadium

Top scorers
- Tries: Kieran Gill (19)
- Goals: Jordan Lilley (115)
- Points: Jordan Lilley (255)
← 2023	List of seasons	2025 →

This article details the Bradford Bulls rugby league football club's 2024 season. This is the Bulls' sixth consecutive season in the Championship.

== Season review ==
=== May 2023 ===
Hull Kingston Rovers announced the signing of second rower Ajahni Wallace from the Bulls on a 2-year deal from the 2024 season.

=== June 2023 ===
Prop forward Josh Johnson left the club by mutual consent in order to join Oldham R.L.F.C..

=== July 2023 ===
Bodene Thompson announced his retirement from the sport in order to return home to New Zealand to spend time with his family.

=== August 2023 ===
Loose forward Brad Foster left the club after one season to explore other first-team opportunities. Winger David Foggin-Johnston announced that he would be leaving the club at the end of the season to join local side Keighley Cougars on a 2-year deal.

=== September 2023 ===
Prop forward Daniel Okoro signed a permanent deal with the Bulls after spending time at the club on loan in the 2023 season. Winger Will Oakes joined the club on a one-year deal from York City Knights.

=== October 2023 ===
Former player Sam Hallas returned to the club for a third spell as he put pen to paper on a two-year deal. French loose forward Jason Baitieri announced that he was leaving the Bulls at the end of his contract to return to France to play for Pia Donkeys. Prolific halfback Dec Patton left the club to join RFL Championship side Swinton Lions. Prop forward Masimbaashe Matongo left the Bulls to take some time away from the sport. It was announced in December 2022 that young academy prospect George Flanagan Jr would depart the Bulls at the end of the 2023 season. Young Australian hooker Mitch Souter signed for the Bulls on a one-year deal from Canberra Raiders. Prop Daniel Smith signed a two-year deal with the club following his release from Featherstone Rovers.

=== November 2023 ===
Veteran back rower John Davies signed a one-year deal with the Bulls after spending 8 seasons at Featherstone Rovers. It wouldn't take long for Davies to return to his former club as Featherstone announced a pre season friendly against the Bulls for January 7. Hooker James Segeyaro left Bradford at the end of his contract and signed for Illawarra Rugby League side Western Suburbs Red Devils. Young halfback Myles Lawford left the Bulls at the end of his contract in order to sign for Wakefield Trinity with the Bulls receiving some compensation.

=== December 2023 ===
Huddersfield Giants fullback Aiden McGowan signed for the club on a season long loan in order to get game time. Academy graduate Marcus Green was released by mutual consent and signed with Midlands Hurricanes. The Bulls kicked off pre-season with a tight 24–16 win over local rivals Halifax Panthers with Chester Butler, Brad England, George Flanagan and Jayden Myers grabbing the tries and Jordan Lilley kicking three goals.

=== January 2024 ===
Bradford continued their season preparations with a 16–12 loss to Featherstone Rovers. Winger Jorge Taufua crossed for two tries whist fellow winger Ben Blackmore scored the other one. Hull F.C. prepared for their Super League season by sending a young squad to face the Bulls in a friendly. The Bulls beat Hull FC 34–32 with both teams playing quite young sides, senior players such as Joe Arundel and Brad England scored for the Bulls, with pack man Daniel Smith scoring two. It was announced that the Bulls would face arch rivals Leeds Rhinos in a pre season friendly for the Keith Howard Foundation Trophy on 28 February. Bradford accepted a transfer request from second rower Brad England so he could join Featherstone Rovers with immediate effect. After impressing in pre-season, young trialist prop Elliot Peposhi signed a one-year deal with the club. Bradford rounded off pre-season with a comprehensive 34-8 win over a youthful Leeds side with hooker Mitch Souter taking the headlines with two tries.

=== February 2024 ===
The Bulls kicked off their season with a 40-4 win in the 2024 RFL 1895 Cup against Dewsbury Rams and then backed this performance up in the 2024 Challenge Cup by beating North Wales Crusaders 48-2 with George Flanagan grabbing a brace of tries. A 26-18 win over local rivals Keighley Cougars ensured the Bulls kept their 100% winning record to start the season. Bradford exited the Challenge Cup with a 26-12 loss to Widnes Vikings. With injuries mounting up the Bulls announced the signing of centre Keanan Brand from Leigh Leopards on a two week loan as well as hooker Corey Johnson from Leeds Rhinos on a season long loan.

=== March 2024 ===
Bradford started March by progressing to the 2024 RFL 1895 Cup quarter-finals by beating Swinton Lions 21-12. Young Australian second rower Zac Fulton (grandson of Australian Immortal Bob Fulton) on a one year deal from NRL side Manly Sea Eagles. Ahead of the Championship opener the Bulls announced the signing of young prop Lucas Green from Warrington Wolves and young second-row Harvey Wilson from Wigan Warriors both on an initial one month loan deals. The Bulls kicked off the 2024 RFL Championship season with a heavy 42-12 loss to favourites Wakefield Trinity. The Bulls signed North Sydney Bears hooker Tyran Ott on a one year deal. After losing Jorge Taufua to suspension, the Bulls brought in young winger Connor Carr from Huddersfield Giants on a two week loan deal. Young prop Max Wood joined the Bulls on a two week loan deal from Warrington Wolves. Loan signing Keanan Brand returned to his parent club Leigh Leopards after suffering an MCL injury. Bradford rounded off the month by getting their first win in the Championship by beating local rivals Halifax Panthers 29-10 with debutant Zac Fulton scoring.

=== April 2024 ===
The Bulls announced that former loanee Fenton Rogers has rejoined the club on loan from Huddersfield Giants. Warrington Wolves announced the signing of Bulls forward Daniel Okoro with immediate effect. Bradford kicked off April by beating Featherstone Rovers 24-14, the first time the Bulls had won at Post Office Road since 2015. The Bulls backed this up with a 19-12 win over Toulouse Olympique which took Bradford up to 4th in the league. However the following week the Bulls suffered a 25-14 loss to York Knights. Young Wigan Warriors winger Jacob Douglas signed for the club on a two week loan deal. The Bulls finished the month off with a late 14-13 defeat to Widnes Vikings.

=== May 2024 ===
The Bulls started the month off well with a 38-12 win over Swinton Lions with centre Kieran Gill grabbing the headlines with two tries. Veteran hooker George Flanagan signed for local rivals Keighley Cougars on a season long loan. Bradford exited the 2024 RFL 1895 Cup at the semi final stage by losing 40-14 to eventual winners Wakefield Trinity. The Bulls got back to winning ways with a 38-12 victory over Swinton Lions. Hull F.C. wingers Liam Tindall and Jayden Okunbor joined the club on short term loans. Okunbor scored a try on debut as the Bulls beat Sheffield Eagles 28-10. Winger Ben Blackmore asked the club for a release due to work reasons before subsequently signing for Keighley Cougars. The Bulls rounded off May with a narrow 21-20 loss away to Batley Bulldogs.

=== June 2024 ===
Bradford beat Barrow Raiders 36-24 to start the month off. Australian winger Max Lehmann signed for the club from Brisbane Tigers on a deal for the rest of the season. They backed this up with a 36-18 win over Whitehaven R.L.F.C.. Australian prop forward Logan Bayliss-Brow joined the club on a two and half year deal from Queensland Cup side Redcliffe Dolphins. The Bulls announced the signing of Hull F.C. prop forward Franklin Pele on a deal until the end of the 2024 season. Bradford continued their winning streak with a 38-12 victory over Dewsbury Rams.

=== July 2024 ===
The Bulls announced the signing of prop forward Nathan Mason on a permanent 18 month contract from Illawarra Rugby League side Corrimal Cougars. Loan signing Jayden Okunbor returned to the club to sign a permanent deal. Bradford picked up their first point away at Toulouse Olympique since 2019 with a hard fought 12-12 draw. The following week, Bradford lost 14-2 to league leaders Wakefield Trinity. Young prop Harvey Makin joined the club on loan from Wigan Warriors on an initial one-month deal which was subsequently extended to the end of the season. The Bulls got back to winning ways with a 36-28 win over York Knights. Due to 11 injuries to the first team squad, the Bulls signed Hull Kingston Rovers prop Zach Fishwick on a two week loan deal. Bradford rounded off the month with a disappointing 25-6 loss to Widnes Vikings. The Bulls announced the signing of former halfback Jarrod Sammut on a loan deal for the rest of the season from Workington Town.

=== August 2024 ===
Young Leeds Rhinos winger Jack Smith joined the club on loan for the rest of the season. Academy product Jacob Bateman joined Cornwall R.L.F.C. on a loan deal for the rest of the season. With an injury crisis ongoing the Bulls brought in Wakefield Trinity center Romain Franco on loan for the rest of the season. The Bulls kicked off the month with a 24-24 draw away to Barrow Raiders, however the following week, Bradford had a comprehensive 58-0 win over Whitehaven R.L.F.C. with Keven Appo and Harvey Makin scoring two tries a piece. A last minute 22-21 loss to Featherstone Rovers was followed with a response against Doncaster R.L.F.C as the Bulls came away 18-4 winners. To round the month off, Bradford beat Dewsbury Rams in a 54-0 rout with Franco and Franklin Pele scoring two tries each.

== Milestones ==
- 1985 Cup Round 2: Aiden McGowan, John Davies and Mitch Souter made their debuts for the Bulls.
- 1985 Cup Round 2: Aiden McGowan and Mitch Souter scored their 1st try for the Bulls.
- CCR3: Daniel Smith and Elliot Peposhi made their debuts for the Bulls.
- CCR3: Eribe Doro scored his 1st try for the Bulls.
- 1985 Cup QF: Keanan Brand made his debut for the Bulls.
- Round 1: Lucas Green and Harvey Wilson made their debuts for the Bulls.
- Round 2: Zac Fulton, Tyran Ott, Connor Carr and Max Wood made their debuts for the Bulls.
- Round 2: Zac Fulton and Max Wood scored their 1st try for the Bulls.
- Round 2: Jordan Lilley kicked his 100th goal and 10th drop goal for the Bulls.
- Round 2: Jordan Lilley reached 300 points for the Bulls.
- Round 3: Chester Butler made his 50th appearance for the Bulls.
- Round 5: Sam Hallas made his 100th appearance for the Bulls.
- Round 5: Elliot Peposhi scored his 1st try for the Bulls.
- Round 6: Jacob Douglas made his debut for the Bulls.
- Round 7: Kieran Gill scored his 50th try and reached 200 points for the Bulls.
- Round 7: Daniel Okoro scored his 1st try for the Bulls.
- Round 8: Jayden Okunbor and Jacob Bateman made their debuts for the Bulls.
- Round 8: Jayden Okunbor scored his 1st try for the Bulls.
- Round 12: Jordan Baldwinson made his 50th appearance for the Bulls.
- Round 12: John Davies scored his 1st try for the Bulls.
- Round 12: Jordan Lilley reached 400 points for the Bulls.
- Round 13: Max Lehmann and Franklin Pele made their debuts for the Bulls.
- Round 13: Max Lehmann scored his 1st try for the Bulls.
- Round 13: Jordan Lilley scored his 25th try for the Bulls.
- Round 14: Logan Bayliss-Brow made his debut for the Bulls.
- Round 16: Harvey Makin made his debut for the Bulls.
- Round 16: Keven Appo made his 50th appearance for the Bulls.
- Round 17: Zach Fishwick made his debut for the Bulls.
- Round 18: Jack Smith made his debut for the Bulls.
- Round 19: Harvey Makin and Franklin Pele scored their 1st try for the Bulls.
- Round 22: Romain Franco made his debut for the Bulls.
- Round 22: Romain Franco, Tyran Ott and Daniel Smith scored their 1st try for the Bulls.
- Round 23: Jordan Lilley made his 150th appearance for the Bulls.

== Preseason friendlies ==
LEGEND
Win
Draw
Loss

Date	Competition	Vrs	H/A	Venue	Result	Score	Tries	Goals	Att	Report
24 December 2023	Pre Season	Halifax Panthers	H	Odsal Stadium	W	24-16	Butler, England, Flanagan, Myers	Lilley 3/3, Jowitt 1/1	Att	Report
7 January 2024	Pre Season	Featherstone Rovers	A	Post Office Road	L	12-16	Taufua (2), Blackmore	Lilley 0/1, Jowitt 0/2	Att	Report
14 January 2024	Pre Season	Hull F.C.	H	Odsal Stadium	W	34-32	Smith (2), Arundel, England, Flanagan, Gill	Jowitt 5/6	Att	Report
28 January 2024	Pre Season	Leeds Rhinos	H	Odsal Stadium	W	34-8	Souter (2), Doro, McGowan, Myers, Peposhi	Lilley 5/6	4,618	Report

=== Player appearances ===
- Friendly games only

FB=Fullback	C=Centre	W=Winger	SO=Stand Off	SH=Scrum half	P=Prop	H=Hooker	SR=Second Row	LF=Loose forward	B=Bench

No	Player	1	2	3	4
1	Tom Holmes				
2	Ben Blackmore	x	W	x	W
3	Joe Arundel	x	B	C	B
4	Kieran Gill	C	C	x	C
5	Jorge Taufua	W	W	x	W
6	Lee Gaskell	SO	SO	x	SO
7	Jordan Lilley	SH	SH	x	SH
8	Jordan Baldwinson				
9	George Flanagan	B	B	H	B
10	Ebon Scurr	x	B	x	B
11	Brad England	SR	x	B	– (Note: Joined Featherstone Rovers)
12	Chester Butler	SR	SR	x	SR
13	Michael Lawrence	P	x	x	P
14	John Davies	x	SR	x	SR
15	Daniel Smith	P	x	P	P
16	Keven Appo	B	B	SR	B
17	Eribe Doro	B	P	x	B
18	Mitch Souter	H	H	x	H
19	Sam Hallas	L	L	x	L
20	Billy Jowitt	FB	FB	FB	B
21	Jayden Myers	C	C	x	C
22	Will Oakes	W	B	W	B
23	Daniel Okoro	x	P	P	B
24	Aiden McGowan	B	x	x	FB
30	Elliot Peposhi	B	x	SR	B
n/a	Sam Ackroyd	x	B	SH	x
n/a	Will Adams	B	B	C	x
n/a	Bailey Arnold	x	x	B	x
n/a	Finley Balback	x	x	B	x
n/a	Jacob Bateman	x	x	B	x
n/a	Mckenzie Scurr	x	B	W	x
n/a	Jamie Gill	B	x	B	x
n/a	Harry Gray	x	x	B	x
n/a	Daniel Moss	B	B	SO	x
n/a	Ethan Newboult	x	x	B	x
n/a	Mckenzie Scurr	x	B	W	x
n/a	Dom Waites	B	B	B	x

= Injured

= Suspended

== Table ==
Pos	Team	Pld	W	D	L	PF	PA	PD	Pts	Qualification
1	Wakefield Trinity	26	25	0	1	1010	262	+748	50	Semi-finals
2	Toulouse Olympique	26	18	1	7	782	384	+398	37	Semi-finals
3	Bradford Bulls	26	16	2	8	682	387	+295	34	Eliminators
4	York Knights	26	15	0	11	655	473	+182	30	Eliminators
5	Widnes Vikings	26	14	1	11	551	475	+76	29	Eliminators
6	Featherstone Rovers	26	14	0	12	622	500	+122	28	Eliminators
7	Sheffield Eagles	26	14	0	12	626	526	+100	28	
8	Doncaster	26	12	1	13	498	619	−121	25	
9	Halifax Panthers	26	11	0	15	509	650	−141	22	
10	Batley Bulldogs	26	11	0	15	422	591	−169	22	
11	Barrow Raiders	26	9	1	16	458	758	−300	19	
12	Swinton Lions	26	9	0	17	466	678	−212	18	League One play-off
13	Whitehaven	26	8	2	16	451	854	−403	18	Relegation to League One
14	Dewsbury Rams	26	2	0	24	344	919	−575	4	Relegation to League One

Source: RFL
Rules for classification: 1) Competition points; 2) Points difference; 3) Points percentage (points scored/points conceded x 100)

== RFL Championship ==
LEGEND
Win
Draw
Loss
Postponed

2024 Championship

Date	Competition	Rnd	Vrs	H/A	Venue	Result	Score	Tries	Goals	Att	Live on TV	Report
15 March 2024	Championship	1	Wakefield Trinity	A	Belle Vue	L	12-42	Gill, McGowan	Lilley 2/3	7,221	-	Report
29 March 2024	Championship	2	Halifax Panthers	H	Odsal Stadium	W	29-10	Fulton, Myers, Souter, Wood	Lilley 6/6, Lilley 1 DG	3,853	-	Report
7 April 2024	Championship	3	Featherstone Rovers	A	Post Office Road	W	24-14	Carr (2), Butler, Gill	Lilley 4/6	-	-	Report
13 April 2024	Championship	4	Toulouse Olympique	H	Odsal Stadium	W	19-12	Gill (2), Fulton	Lilley 3/4, Lilley 1 DG	2,720	-	Report
21 April 2024	Championship	5	York Knights	A	York Community Stadium	L	14-25	Gill, McGowan, Peposhi	Lilley 1/3	2,675	-	Report
28 April 2024	Championship	6	Widnes Vikings	H	Odsal Stadium	L	13-14	Blackmore, Holmes	Lilley 2/3, Lilley 1 DG	3,029	-	Report
5 May 2024	Championship	7	Swinton Lions	A	Heywood Road	W	38-12	Gill (2), Appo, Fulton, Myers, Okoro, Souter	Lilley 5/7	1,187	-	Report
19 May 2024	Championship	8	Sheffield Eagles	H	Odsal Stadium	W	28-10	Fulton (2), Gill, McGowan, Okunbor	Lilley 4/6	2,234	-	Report
26 May 2024	Championship	9	Batley Bulldogs	A	Mount Pleasant	L	20-21	Fulton (2), Holmes	Lilley 4/5	-	-	Report
2 June 2024	Championship	10	Barrow Raiders	H	Odsal Stadium	W	36-24	Myers (2), Butler, Fulton, Gill, Okunbor	Lilley 6/8	2,655	-	Report
16 June 2024	Championship	11	Whitehaven R.L.F.C.	A	Recreation Ground	W	36-18	Taufua (2), Gaskell, Gill, Myers, Souter	Lilley 6/7	-	-	Report
23 June 2024	Championship	12	Doncaster R.L.F.C.	H	Odsal Stadium	W	38-4	Appo, Davies, Gill, Holmes, Lilley, Okunbor, Souter	Lilley 5/7	2,909	-	Report
30 June 2024	Championship	13	Dewsbury Rams	A	Crown Flatt	W	38-12	Fulton (2), Davies, Holmes, Lehmann, Lilley, Souter	Lilley 5/7	-	-	Report
6 July 2024	Championship	14	Toulouse Olympique	A	Stade Ernest-Wallon	D	12-12	Fulton, Lehmann	Lilley 2/2	2,340	-	Report
14 July 2024	Championship	15	Wakefield Trinity	H	Odsal Stadium	L	2-14	-	Lilley 1/1	3,203	-	Report
21 July 2024	Championship	16	York Knights	H	Odsal Stadium	W	36-28	Gill (2), Davies, Doro, Fulton, Lehmann, Myers	Lilley 4/7	3,025	-	Report
28 July 2024	Championship	17	Widnes Vikings	A	Halton Stadium	L	6-25	Lehmann	Lilley 1/1	3,065	-	Report
4 August 2024	Championship	18	Barrow Raiders	A	Craven Park	D	24-24	Appo, Fulton, Gill, Holmes, Okunbor	Lilley 2/5	2,419	-	Report
11 August 2024	Championship	19	Whitehaven R.L.F.C.	H	Odsal Stadium	W	58-0	Appo (2), Makin (2), Doro, Myers, Okunbor, Pele, Sammut, Taufua	Lilley 9/10	2,502	-	Report
18 August 2024	Championship	20	Featherstone Rovers	H	Odsal Stadium	L	21-22	Pele (2), Myers, Okunbor	Lilley 2/4, Lilley 1 DG	3,099	-	Report
25 August 2024	Championship	21	Doncaster R.L.F.C.	A	Keepmoat Stadium	W	18-4	Appo, Holmes, Lilley	Lilley 3/3	1,758	-	Report
30 August 2024	Championship	22	Dewsbury Rams	H	Odsal Stadium	W	54-0	Franco (2), Pele (2), Appo, Holmes, Ott, Scurr, D.Smith	Lilley 9/9	3,006	-	Report
8 September 2024	Championship	23	Sheffield Eagles	A	Olympic Legacy Park	W	30-12	Taufua (2), Franco, Hallas, Okunbor	Lilley 5/7	1,948	-	Report
15 September 2024	Championship	24	Batley Bulldogs	H	Odsal Stadium	W/D/L	Score	Try Scorers	Goal Scorers	Att	TV	Report
22 September 2024	Championship	25	Halifax Panthers	A	Shay Stadium	W/D/L	Score	Try Scorers	Goal Scorers	Att	TV	Report
29 September 2024	Championship	26	Swinton Lions	H	Odsal Stadium	W/D/L	Score	Try Scorers	Goal Scorers	Att	TV	Report

=== Player appearances ===
FB=Fullback	C=Centre	W=Winger	SO=Stand Off	SH=Scrum half	P=Prop	H=Hooker	SR=Second Row	LF=Loose forward	B=Bench

No	Player	1	2	3	4	5	6	7	8	9	10	11	12	13	14	15	16	17	18	19	20	21	22	23	24	25	26	27
1	Tom Holmes						SO	SO	FB	FB	FB	FB	FB	SO	FB	FB	FB	FB	FB	FB	FB	FB	FB	FB	x	x	x	x
2	Ben Blackmore				– (Note: Was at Rochdale Hornets)	W	W			– (Note: Joined Keighley Cougars)															x	x	x	x
3	Joe Arundel		C	C	C	C	SR			SR															x	x	x	x
4	Kieran Gill	C	C	C	C	C	C	C	C	C	C	C	C	C	C	C	C	C	C						x	x	x	x
5	Jorge Taufua	W	Red card	Red card	W	W		W				W	W	W	W	W	Red card	Red card	Red card	W	W	W		W	x	x	x	x
6	Lee Gaskell	SO									SO	SO	SO										SO	SO	x	x	x	x
7	Jordan Lilley	SH	SH	SH	SH	SH	SH	SH	SH	SH	SH	SH	SH	SH	SH	SH	SH	SH	SH	SH	SH	SH	SH	SH	x	x	x	x
8	Jordan Baldwinson									B	B	P	P	P	P										x	x	x	x
9	George Flanagan	B	x	x	– (Note: Was at Rochdale Hornets)		x	x	– (Note: Joined Keighley Cougars)																x	x	x	x
10	Ebon Scurr						B	B	B	B	B	B	B	B	B	B	Red card	Red card	Red card	Red card	Red card		B	B	x	x	x	x
12	Chester Butler	SR	SR	SR	SR	SR					SR														x	x	x	x
13	Michael Lawrence	P						P	P											P	P	P		P	x	x	x	x
14	John Davies		SO	SO	SO	SO			SR	L	B	SR	SR	SR	SR	SR	SR	SR	SR		B	B	SR	B	x	x	x	x
15	Daniel Smith	P	P	P	P							P											P	B	x	x	x	x
16	Keven Appo	B	B	B	B	B	B	B	B	B	L	L	B	P		B	B	B	B	SR	SR	SR	SR	SR	x	x	x	x
17	Eribe Doro		P	P	P	P	P	L	L	P	P				L	P	P	Red card	Red card	B	L	L		P	x	x	x	x
18	Mitch Souter	H	H	H	H	H	B	H	H	H	H	H	H	H	H	H	H	H	H	B	B	H			x	x	x	x
19	Sam Hallas	L	L	L	L	L						B	L	L	B	L	L	L	L	L			L	L	x	x	x	x
20	Billy Jowitt	C	x																						x	x	x	x
21	Jayden Myers	W	W	W	x	x	C	C	x	x	C	C	C	C			C	C		C	C	C	C	C	x	x	x	x
22	Will Oakes																								x	x	x	x
23	Daniel Okoro	B	x	– (Note: Signed for Warrington Wolves)			B	B	– (Note: Returned to Warrington Wolves)									B	B	– (Note: Returned to Warrington Wolves)					x	x	x	x
24	Aiden McGowan	FB	FB	FB	FB	FB	FB	FB	W	W	W			FB	– (Note: Returned to Huddersfield Giants)										x	x	x	x
27	Lucas Green	B	– (Note: Returned to Warrington Wolves)																						x	x	x	x
28	Harvey Wilson	SR	B	B	B	B	SR	SR	– (Note: Returned to Wigan Warriors)																x	x	x	x
29	Zac Fulton	x	SR	SR	SR	SR		SR	SR	SR	SR	SR	SR	SR	SR	SR	SR	SR	SR	SR	SR	SR	B	SR	x	x	x	x
30	Elliot Peposhi	x	x	x	x	B	L	x	B	B	x	x	B	B	x	B	B	x	x	x	x	x	x	x	x	x	x	x
31	Tyran Ott	– (Note: Was at North Sydney Bears)	B	B	B	B	H	B	SO	SO	B	B	B	B	SO	SO	SO	SO	B	H	H	B	H	H	x	x	x	x
32	Connor Carr	– (Note: Was at Huddersfield Giants)	W	W	W	– (Note: Returned to Huddersfield Giants)																			x	x	x	x
33	Max Wood	– (Note: Was at Warrington Wolves)	B	– (Note: Returned to Warrington Wolves)																					x	x	x	x
34	Fenton Rogers	– (Note: Was at Huddersfield Giants)		B	B	P	P	P	P	P	P	B	P		B	– (Note: Returned to Huddersfield Giants)									x	x	x	x
35	Jacob Douglas	– (Note: Was at Wigan Warriors)					W	W	– (Note: Returned to Wigan Warriors)																x	x	x	x
36	Liam Tindall	– (Note: Was at Hull F.C.)							W	W	– (Note: Returned to Hull F.C.)						W	W		– (Note: Returned to Hull F.C.)					x	x	x	x
37	Jayden Okunbor	– (Note: Was at Hull F.C.)							C	C	W	W	W	– (Note: Returned to Hull F.C.)	W	W	x	x	W	W	W	W	W	W	x	x	x	x
38	Jacob Bateman	x	x	x	x	x	x	x	B	x	x	x	x	x	x	x	x	x	– (Note: On Loan at Cornwall R.L.F.C.)					x	x	x	x	x
39	Max Lehmann	– (Note: Was at Brisbane Tigers)										x	x	W	C	C	W	W	C	C	C	C			x	x	x	x
40	Logan Bayliss-Brow	– (Note: Was at Redcliffe Dolphins)													P	P	P	P	P	P	P	P			x	x	x	x
41	Nathan Mason	– (Note: Was at Corrimal Cougars)														B							B		x	x	x	x
42	Franklin Pele	– (Note: Was at Hull F.C.)											x	B	B		B	P	P	B	B	B	B	B	x	x	x	x
43	Harvey Makin	– (Note: Was at Wigan Warriors)															B	B		B	B	B	P		x	x	x	x
44	Zach Fishwick	– (Note: Was at Hull Kingston Rovers)																B	B	– (Note: Returned to Hull Kingston Rovers)					x	x	x	x
45	Jarrod Sammut	– (Note: Was at Workington Town)																	SO	SO	SO	SO			x	x	x	x
46	Jack Smith	– (Note: Was at Leeds Rhinos)																	W	– (Note: Returned to Leeds Rhinos)			W	– (Note: Returned to Leeds Rhinos)	x	x	x	x
47	Romain Franco	– (Note: Was at Wakefield Trinity)																					C	C	x	x	x	x

= Injured

= Suspended

== Challenge Cup ==
LEGEND
Win
Draw
Loss

Date	Competition	Rnd	Vrs	H/A	Venue	Result	Score	Tries	Goals	Att	TV	Report
11 February 2024	Challenge Cup	3rd	North Wales Crusaders	H	Odsal Stadium	W	48-2	Flanagan (2), Appo, Arundel, Butler, Doro, Gill, McGowan	Lilley 8/8	-	-	Report
25 February 2024	Challenge Cup	4th	Widnes Vikings	H	Odsal Stadium	L	12-26	Gill, Jowitt	Lilley 2/2	-	BBC Sport	Report

=== Player appearances ===
FB=Fullback	C=Centre	W=Winger	SO=Stand Off	SH=Scrum half	P=Prop	H=Hooker	SR=Second Row	LF=Loose forward	B=Bench

No	Player	3rd	4th
1	Tom Holmes		
2	Ben Blackmore		
3	Joe Arundel	C	C
4	Kieran Gill	C	C
5	Jorge Taufua	W	W
6	Lee Gaskell	SO	
7	Jordan Lilley	SH	SH
8	Jordan Baldwinson		
9	George Flanagan	B	B
10	Ebon Scurr		
12	Chester Butler	SR	SR
13	Michael Lawrence		P
14	John Davies	SR	SR
15	Daniel Smith	P	B
16	Keven Appo	B	B
17	Eribe Doro	P	P
18	Mitch Souter	H	H
19	Sam Hallas	L	L
20	Billy Jowitt	x	SO
21	Jayden Myers	W	W
22	Will Oakes	x	x
23	Daniel Okoro	B	B
24	Aiden McGowan	FB	FB
30	Elliot Peposhi	B	x

== 1895 Cup ==
LEGEND
Win
Draw
Loss

Date	Competition	Rnd	Vrs	H/A	Venue	Result	Score	Tries	Goals	Att	TV	Report
4 February 2024	1895 Cup	2nd	Dewsbury Rams	A	Crown Flatt	W	40-4	Taufua (2), Arundel, Gill, Myers, McGowan, Scurr, Souter	Lilley 4/8	-	-	Report
18 February 2024	1895 Cup	3rd	Keighley Cougars	A	Cougar Park	W	26-18	Appo, Hallas, Lilley, McGowan, Taufua	Lilley 3/5	3,729	-	Report
3 March 2024	1895 Cup	QF	Swinton Lions	H	Odsal Stadium	W	21-12	Butler, Gill, Lilley	Lilley 4/4, Lilley 1 DG	-	-	Report
12 May 2024	1895 Cup	SF	Wakefield Trinity	H	Odsal Stadium	L	14-40	Fulton, Gill	Lilley 3/3	5,340	-	Report

=== Player appearances ===
FB=Fullback	C=Centre	W=Winger	SO=Stand Off	SH=Scrum half	P=Prop	H=Hooker	SR=Second Row	LF=Loose forward	B=Bench

No	Player	2nd	3rd	QF	SF
1	Tom Holmes				SO
2	Ben Blackmore	W			
3	Joe Arundel	B	C	SR	C
4	Kieran Gill	C	C	C	C
5	Jorge Taufua	W	W	W	W
6	Lee Gaskell	SO		SO	
7	Jordan Lilley	SH	SH	SH	SH
8	Jordan Baldwinson				
9	George Flanagan	B	B	B	– (Note: Signed for Keighley Cougars)
10	Ebon Scurr	P			
12	Chester Butler	SR	SR	SR	
13	Michael Lawrence		P	P	P
14	John Davies	SR	SR	L	L
15	Daniel Smith		B	P	
16	Keven Appo	B	B	B	B
17	Eribe Doro	P	P		P
18	Mitch Souter	H	H		H
19	Sam Hallas	L	L	B	
20	Billy Jowitt	x	SO	x	x
21	Jayden Myers	C	W	W	W
22	Will Oakes	x	x	x	x
23	Daniel Okoro	B	B	B	B
24	Aiden McGowan	FB	FB	FB	FB
25	Corey Johnson	– (Note: Was at Leeds Rhinos)		H	– (Note: Returned to Leeds Rhinos)
26	Keanan Brand	– (Note: Was at Leigh Leopards)		C	– (Note: Returned to Leigh Leopards)
28	Harvey Wilson	– (Note: Was at Wigan Warriors)			SR
29	Zac Fulton	– (Note: Was at Manly Sea Eagles)			SR
30	Elliot Peposhi	x	x	x	x
31	Tyran Ott	– (Note: Was at North Sydney Bears)			B
34	Fenton Rogers	– (Note: Was at Huddersfield Giants)			B

== Squad statistics ==
- Appearances and points include (Championship, Challenge Cup and Play-offs) as of 8 September 2024.

No	Player	Position	Age	Previous club	Apps	Tries	Goals	DG	Points
1	Tom Holmes	Fullback	28	Featherstone Rovers	19	7	0	0	28
2	Ben Blackmore	Wing	31	Dewsbury Rams	3	1	0	0	4
3	Joe Arundel	Centre	33	Halifax Panthers	12	2	0	0	8
4	Kieran Gill	Centre	28	Newcastle Thunder	24	19	0	0	76
5	Jorge Taufua	Wing	32	Wakefield Trinity	19	8	0	0	32
6	Lee Gaskell	Stand Off	33	Wakefield Trinity	9	1	0	0	4
7	Jordan Lilley	Scrum Half	27	Leeds Rhinos	29	5	115	5	255
8	Jordan Baldwinson	Prop	29	York City Knights	6	0	0	0	0
9	George Flanagan	Hooker	37	Hunslet R.L.F.C.	6	2	0	0	8
10	Ebon Scurr	Prop	23	Bradford Bulls Academy	13	2	0	0	8
12	Chester Butler	Second Row	28	Huddersfield Giants	11	4	0	0	16
13	Michael Lawrence	Loose Forward	34	Huddersfield Giants	11	0	0	0	0
14	John Davies	Second Row	33	Featherstone Rovers	25	3	0	0	12
15	Daniel Smith	Prop	31	Featherstone Rovers	11	1	0	0	4
16	Keven Appo	Second Row	25	PNG Hunters	28	9	0	0	36
17	Eribe Doro	Prop	23	Halifax Panthers	21	3	0	0	12
18	Mitch Souter	Hooker	23	Canberra Raiders	26	6	0	0	24
19	Sam Hallas	Loose Forward	27	Hunslet R.L.F.C.	21	2	0	0	8
20	Billy Jowitt	Full Back	22	Bradford Bulls Academy	3	1	0	0	4
21	Jayden Myers	Wing	19	Bradford Bulls Academy	22	9	0	0	36
22	Will Oakes	Wing	25	York Knights	0	0	0	0	0
23	Daniel Okoro	Prop	21	Hull Kingston Rovers	11	1	0	0	4
24	Aiden McGowan	Fullback	22	Huddersfield Giants (Loan)	17	6	0	0	24
25	Corey Johnson	Hooker	23	Leeds Rhinos (Loan)	1	0	0	0	0
26	Keanan Brand	Centre	25	Leigh Leopards (Loan)	1	0	0	0	0
27	Lucas Green	Prop	19	Warrington Wolves (Loan)	1	0	0	0	0
28	Harvey Wilson	Second Row	19	Wigan Warriors (Loan)	8	0	0	0	0
29	Zac Fulton	Second Row	22	Manly Sea Eagles	22	14	0	0	56
30	Elliot Peposhi	Second Row	20	St Helens R.F.C.	9	1	0	0	4
31	Tyran Ott	Hooker	23	North Sydney Bears	23	1	0	0	4
32	Connor Carr	Wing	20	Huddersfield Giants (Loan)	3	2	0	0	8
33	Max Wood	Prop	19	Warrington Wolves (Loan)	1	1	0	0	4
34	Fenton Rogers	Prop	20	Huddersfield Giants (Loan)	12	0	0	0	0
35	Jacob Douglas	Wing	20	Wigan Warriors (Loan)	2	0	0	0	0
36	Liam Tindall	Wing	22	Hull F.C. (Loan)	4	0	0	0	0
37	Jayden Okunbor	Wing	27	Hull F.C. (Loan)	13	7	0	0	28
38	Jacob Bateman	Loose Forward	18	Bradford Bulls Academy	1	0	0	0	0
39	Max Lehmann	Wing	24	Brisbane Tigers	9	4	0	0	16
40	Logan Bayliss-Brow	Prop	24	Redcliffe Dolphins	8	0	0	0	0
41	Nathan Mason	Prop	30	Corrimal Cougars	2	0	0	0	0
42	Franklin Pele	Prop	23	Hull F.C.	10	5	0	0	20
43	Harvey Makin	Prop	20	Wigan Warriors (Loan)	6	2	0	0	8
44	Zach Fishwick	Prop	19	Hull Kingston Rovers (Loan)	2	0	0	0	0
45	Jarrod Sammut	Stand Off	37	Workington Town (Loan)	4	1	0	0	4
46	Jack Smith	Wing	19	Leeds Rhinos (Loan)	2	0	0	0	0
47	Romain Franco	Centre	25	Wakefield Trinity (Loan)	2	3	0	0	12

== Transfers ==
=== In ===
	Name	Position	Signed from	Date
(Nigeria)	Daniel Okoro	Prop	Hull Kingston Rovers	September 2023
(England)	Will Oakes	Wing	York Knights	September 2023
(England)	Sam Hallas	Loose Forward	Hunslet R.L.F.C.	October 2023
(Australia)	Mitch Souter	Hooker	Canberra Raiders	October 2023
(England)	Daniel Smith	Prop	Featherstone Rovers	October 2023
(England)	John Davies	Second Row	Featherstone Rovers	November 2023
(Republic of Ireland)	Aiden McGowan	Fullback	Huddersfield Giants (Loan)	December 2023
(England)	Elliot Peposhi	Second Row	St Helens R.F.C.	January 2024
(England)	Corey Johnson	Hooker	Leeds Rhinos (Loan)	February 2024
(England)	Keanan Brand	Centre	Leigh Leopards (Loan)	February 2024
(Australia)	Zac Fulton	Second Row	Manly Sea Eagles	March 2024
(England)	Lucas Green	Prop	Warrington Wolves (Loan)	March 2024
(England)	Harvey Wilson	Second Row	Wigan Warriors (Loan)	March 2024
(England)	Connor Carr	Wing	Huddersfield Giants (Loan)	March 2024
(England)	Max Wood	Prop	Warrington Wolves (Loan)	March 2024
(Australia)	Tyran Ott	Hooker	North Sydney Bears	March 2024
(England)	Fenton Rogers	Prop	Huddersfield Giants (Loan)	April 2024
(England)	Jacob Douglas	Wing	Wigan Warriors (Loan)	April 2024
(England)	Liam Tindall	Wing	Hull F.C. (Loan)	May 2024
(Australia)	Jayden Okunbor	Wing	Hull F.C. (Loan)	May 2024
(New Zealand)	Franklin Pele	Prop	Hull F.C.	June 2024
(Australia)	Max Lehmann	Wing	Brisbane Tigers	June 2024
(Australia)	Logan Bayliss-Brow	Prop	Redcliffe Dolphins	June 2024
(Australia)	Jayden Okunbor	Wing	Hull F.C.	July 2024
(England)	Nathan Mason	Prop	Corrimal Cougars	July 2024
(England)	Harvey Makin	Prop	Wigan Warriors (Loan)	July 2024
(England)	Zach Fishwick	Prop	Hull Kingston Rovers (Loan)	July 2024
(Australia)	Jarrod Sammut	Stand Off	Workington Town (Loan)	July 2024
(England)	Jack Smith	Wing	Leeds Rhinos (Loan)	August 2024
(France)	Romain Franco	Centre	Wakefield Trinity (Loan)	August 2024

=== Out ===
	Name	Position	Club Signed	Date
(England)	Josh Johnson	Prop	Oldham R.L.F.C.	June 2023
(New Zealand)	Bodene Thompson	Loose Forward	Retirement	July 2023
(England)	Brad Foster	Loose Forward	Released	August 2023
(England)	David Foggin-Johnston	Winger	Keighley Cougars	October 2023
(England)	Dec Patton	Stand Off	Swinton Lions	October 2023
(England)	Ajahni Wallace	Second Row	Hull Kingston Rovers	October 2023
(Papua New Guinea)	James Segeyaro	Hooker	Western Suburbs Red Devils	October 2023
(Zimbabwe)	Masimbaashe Matongo	Prop	Released	October 2023
(England)	Myles Lawford	Scrum Half	Wakefield Trinity	October 2023
(England)	George Flanagan Jr	Fullback	Huddersfield Giants	October 2023
(England)	Michael Hoyle	Prop	Released	October 2023
(France)	Jason Baitieri	Loose Forward	Pia Donkeys	October 2023
(England)	Jansin Turgut	Loose Forward	Released	October 2023
(England)	Marcus Green	Prop	Midlands Hurricanes	December 2023
(England)	Brad England	Second Row	Featherstone Rovers	January 2024
(Nigeria)	Daniel Okoro	Prop	Warrington Wolves	April 2024
(England)	George Flanagan	Hooker	Keighley Cougars (Loan)	May 2024
(England)	Ben Blackmore	Wing	Keighley Cougars	May 2024
(England)	George Flanagan	Hooker	Keighley Cougars	June 2024
(England)	Jacob Bateman	Loose Forward	Cornwall R.L.F.C. (Loan)	August 2024
