= 2022 Hull Kingston Rovers season =

English rugby league season

- Super League Rank: 8th
- Challenge Cup: Semi-finals

Team information
- CEO: Neil Hudgell
- Head Coach: Tony Smith (until 4 July 2022); Danny McGuire (from 4 July 2022)
- Stadium: KCOM Craven Park; Kingston upon Hull, East Riding of Yorkshire
| ← 2021 | 2023 → |

In the 2022 rugby league season, Hull Kingston Rovers competed in Super League XXVII and the 2022 Challenge Cup. They were coached by Tony Smith until 4 July 2022 and Danny McGuire from 4 July 2022 onwards.

== Season review ==
On 11 February, Hull Kingston Rovers began their Super League campaign with a loss to Wigan Warriors, followed a week later by a defeat at Huddersfield Giants. The first win came in Round 3 at home to Castleford Tigers. The most successful period of the season came in April with a 34–10 win over Castleford in the quarter-final of the Challenge Cup and a run of four consecutive league wins that placed them in the top half of the table. In May, the Challenge Cup campaign came to an end with a 25–4 loss to Huddersfield in the semi-finals. A poor mid-season included a run of three league losses followed by a further run of four defeats culminating with a 34–28 loss to Hull F.C. at the Magic Weekend. Hopes of a play-off place were kept alive in July with back-to-back wins over Wakefield Trinity and Warrington Wolves, but a number of losses followed so that, even with a 38–28 win over Wigan in the penultimate round, Hull KR could no longer qualify and their season ended with a 36–4 away over local rivals Hull F.C.

== Results ==
=== Pre-season friendlies ===
W Win L Loss

Pre-season results
| Date | Versus | H/A | Venue | Result | Score | Tries | Goals | Attendance | Report |
|---|---|---|---|---|---|---|---|---|---|
| 21 January | Dewsbury Rams | H | Sewell Group Craven Park | W | 60–12 | | | | |
| 30 January | Huddersfield Giants | H | Sewell Group Craven Park | W | 24–18 | | | | |

=== Super League ===
==== Table ====
| Pos | Team | Pld | W | D | L | PF | PA | PD | Pts | Qualification |
|---|---|---|---|---|---|---|---|---|---|---|
| 1 | St Helens (C, L) | 27 | 21 | 0 | 6 | 674 | 374 | +300 | 42 | Advance to semi-finals |
| 2 | Wigan Warriors | 27 | 19 | 0 | 8 | 818 | 483 | +335 | 38 | Advance to semi-finals |
| 3 | Huddersfield Giants | 27 | 17 | 1 | 9 | 613 | 497 | +116 | 35 | Advance to elimination finals |
| 4 | Catalans Dragons | 27 | 16 | 0 | 11 | 539 | 513 | +26 | 32 | Advance to elimination finals |
| 5 | Leeds Rhinos | 27 | 14 | 1 | 12 | 577 | 528 | +49 | 29 | Advance to elimination finals |
| 6 | Salford Red Devils | 27 | 14 | 0 | 13 | 700 | 602 | +98 | 28 | Advance to elimination finals |
| 7 | Castleford Tigers | 27 | 13 | 0 | 14 | 544 | 620 | −76 | 26 | |
| 8 | Hull Kingston Rovers | 27 | 12 | 0 | 15 | 498 | 608 | −110 | 24 | |
| 9 | Hull FC | 27 | 11 | 0 | 16 | 508 | 675 | −167 | 22 | |
| 10 | Wakefield Trinity | 27 | 10 | 0 | 17 | 497 | 648 | −151 | 20 | |
| 11 | Warrington Wolves | 27 | 9 | 0 | 18 | 568 | 664 | −96 | 18 | |
| 12 | Toulouse Olympique (R) | 27 | 5 | 0 | 22 | 421 | 745 | −324 | 10 | Relegated to the Championship |

(C) Champions; (L) League Leaders' Shield winners; (R) Relegated

==== Super League results ====
W Win D Draw L Loss

Super League results
| Date | Round | Versus | H/A | Venue | Result | Score | Tries | Goals | Attendance | Report |
|---|---|---|---|---|---|---|---|---|---|---|
| 11 February | 1 | Wigan Warriors | H | Sewell Group Craven Park | L | 10–24 | Lewis, Parcell | Abdull | 9,044 | RLP |
| 19 February | 2 | Huddersfield Giants | A | John Smiths Stadium | L | 12–26 | Lewis, Takairangi | Abdull (2) | 5,724 | RLP |
| 25 February | 3 | Castleford Tigers | H | Sewell Group Craven Park | W | 26–10 | Wood (2), Kenny-Dowall, Parcell, Takairangi | Abdull (3) | 7,119 | RLP |
| 4 March | 4 | St Helens | H | Sewell Group Craven Park | L | 8–42 | Hall, Halton | | 7,256 | RLP |
| 11 March | 5 | Salford Red Devils | A | AJ Bell Stadium | W | 26–16 | Lewis 92), Minchella, Storton | Abdull (5) | 3,950 | RLP |
| 18 March | 6 | Catalans Dragons | A | Stade Gilbert Brutus | L | 10–18 | Hall, Kenny-Dowall | Abdull | 6,782 | RLP |
| 1 April | 7 | Warrington Wolves | H | Sewell Group Craven Park | W | 34–18 | Hall (2), Coote, Halton, Keinhorst, Lewis, Litten | Coote (3) | 10,069 | RLP |
| 15 April | 8 | Hull KR | H | Sewell Group Craven Park | W | 16–4 | Coote (2), Hall | Coote (2) | 10,300 | RLP |
| 18 April | 9 | Toulouse Olympique | A | Stade Ernest Wallon | W | 28–24 | Hall (2), Abdull, King, Storton | Dagger (4) | 6,180 | RLP |
| 23 April | 10 | Wakefield Trinity | H | Sewell Group Craven Park | W | 32–10 | Linnett (2), Ryan (2), Coote, Hall, Kenny-Dowall | Coote (2) | 7,058 | RLP |
| 29 April | 11 | Leeds Rhinos | A | Headingley | L | 0–12 | | | 13,333 | RLP |
| 15 May | 12 | Castleford Tigers | A | Mend-A-Hose Jungle | L | 0–32 | | | 8,175 | RLP |
| 21 May | 13 | Catalans Dragons | H | Sewell Group Craven Park | L | 8–20 | Crooks | Coote (2) | 7,199 | RLP |
| 5 June | 14 | Salford Red Devils | H | Sewell Group Craven Park | W | 43–16 | Coote (2), Crooks (2), Hall (2), Ryan | Coote (7 + FG) | 7,023 | RLP |
| 12 June | 15 | St Helens | A | Totally Wicked Stadium | L | 18–26 | Coote (2), Hall | Coote (3) | 9,858 | RLP |
| 26 June | 16 | Huddersfield Giants | H | Sewell Group Craven Park | L | 10–38 | Parcell, Storton | Coote | 7,050 | RLP |
| 2 July | 17 | Toulouse Olympique | A | Stade Ernest Wallon | L | 6–28 | Vete | Dagger | 3,441 | RLP |
| 10 July | 18 | Hull F.C. | N | St James' Park | L | 28–34 | Lewis (3), Keinhorst, Parcell, Wood | Coote (2) | 25,333 | RLP |
| 17 July | 19 | Wakefield Trinity | H | Sewell Group Craven Park | W | 15–10 | Coote, Keinhorst, Ryan | Coote, Dagger (FG) | 7,029 | RLP |
| 22 July | 20 | Warrington Wolves | A | Halliwell Jones Stadium | W | 30–22 | Crooks, Parcell, Royle, Ryan, Wood | Coote (4), Dagger | 7,551 | RLP |
| 28 July | 21 | Wigan Warriors | A | DW Stadium | L | 4–46 | Ryan | | 11,032 | RLP |
| 4 August | 22 | Toulouse Olympique | H | Sewell Group Craven Park | W | 22–16 | Halton, Milnes, Minchella, Ryan | Milnes (3) | 6,763 | RLP |
| 12 August | 23 | Leeds Rhinos | H | Sewell Group Craven Park | L | 20–28 | Hall, Linnett, Parcell, Wood | Wood (2) | 8,028 | RLP |
| 19 August | 24 | St Helens | A | Totally Wicked Stadium | L | 12–38 | Barley, Linnett, Tate | | 10,048 | RLP |
| 25 August | 25 | Wakefield Trinity | A | Be Well Support Stadium | L | 6–18 | Vete | Milnes | 4,653 | RLP |
| 29 August | 26 | Wigan Warriors | H | Sewell Group Craven Park | W | 38–28 | Ryan (2), Fishwick, Hall, Sims, Storton, Tate | Milnes (5) | 7,315 | RLP |
| 3 September | 27 | Hull FC | A | MKM Stadium | W | 36–4 | Hall, Milnes, Minchella, Ryan, Tate, Vete | Milnes (6) | 16,999 | RLP |

=== Challenge Cup ===
W Win L Loss

Challenge Cup results
| Date | Round | Versus | H/A | Venue | Result | Score | Tries | Goals | Attendance | Report |
|---|---|---|---|---|---|---|---|---|---|---|
| 26 March | 6 | Leigh Centurions | H | Sewell Group Craven Park | W | 24–18 | Halton, Lewis, Parcell, Storton | Dagger (3), Abdull | 3,088 | RLP |
| 8 April | Quarter-final | Castleford Tigers | H | Sewell Group Craven Park | W | 34–10 | Minchella (2), Abdull, Hall, Milnes, Wood | Coote (5) | 4,887 | RLP |
| 7 May | Semi-final | Huddersfield Giants | N | Elland Road | L | 4–25 | Kenny-Dowall | | 22,141 | RLP |

== Squad ==
2022 Hull Kingston Rovers Squad
| First team squad | | | Coaching staff |
|---|---|---|---|
| 1 (Scotland) Lachlan Coote – FB; 2 (England) Ben Crooks – CE, WG; 3 (Australia) Brad Takairangi – CE; 4 (New Zealand) Shaun Kenny-Dowall – CE; 5 (England) Ryan Hall – WG; 6 (England) Roger Millward (Jersey Retired); 7 (England) Jordan Abdull – SH (GK); 8 (Tonga) Albert Vete – PR; 9 (Australia) Matt Parcell – HK; 10 (Ireland) George King – PR; 11 (England) Dean Hadley – SR, LF; 12 (Scotland) Kane Linnett – SR; 13 (England) Matty Storton – PR, SR, LF | 14 (England) Jez Litten – HK; 15 (England) Luis Johnson – SR; 16 (Fiji) Korbin Sims – PR, LF; 17 (England) Elliot Minchella – LF; 18 (Germany) Jimmy Keinhorst – CE, SR, WG; 19 (England) Will Dagger – FB, SO (GK); 20 (England) Mikey Lewis – SO, SH; 21 (England) Rowan Milnes – SO, SH; 22 (England) Will Maher – PR; 23 (Ireland) Ethan Ryan – WG; 24 (Ireland) Sam Wood – CE, WG, SR; 25 (England) Greg Richards – PR; 26 (England) Tom Garratt – PR | 27 (England) Frankie Halton – SR, LF; 28 (England) Will Tate – WG, FB; 29 (Samoa) Phoenix Laulu-Togagae – FB; 30 (England) Charlie Cavanaugh – HK; 31 (England) Connor Moore – PR; 32 (England) Daniel Okoro – PR; 33 (England) Max Kirkbright – CE; 34 (England) Zach Fishwick – PR; 36 (England) Sam Royle – SR (Loan) | Head coach: (England) Danny McGuire (Interim); Legend: (c) Captain(s); (vc) Vice-captain(s); Injured; GK = Goal Kicker; Updated: 21 July 2022; Source(s): |
