= Daniel Okoro =

Nigerian rugby league footballer (born 2003)

Dan Okoro
Personal information
- Full name: Daniel Okoro-Aroh
- Born: 18 April 2003 (age 23) Nigeria
- Height: 6 ft 4 in (1.94 m)
- Weight: 16 st 5 lb (104 kg)

Playing information
- Position: Prop, Second-row
Club
Years	Team	Pld	T	G	FG	P
2022–23	Hull Kingston Rovers	0	0	0	0	0
2022(loan)	→ Hunslet	3	0	0	0	0
2023(loan)	→ Newcastle Thunder	7	0	0	0	0
2023(loan)	→ Bradford Bulls	2	0	0	0	0
2024	Bradford Bulls	6	0	0	0	0
2024–25	Warrington Wolves	0	0	0	0	0
2024(loan)	→ Swinton Lions	1	0	0	0	0
2024(loan)	→ Bradford Bulls	5	1	0	0	4
2025(loan)	→ Castleford Tigers	8	0	0	0	0
2025(loan)	→ London Broncos	5	0	0	0	0
2026–	Halifax Panthers	3	0	0	0	0
	Total	40	1	0	0	4
Representative
Years	Team	Pld	T	G	FG	P
2022–	Nigeria	3	2	0	0	8
- Source: As of 6 October 2026

Daniel Okoro (born 18 April 2003) is a Nigeria international rugby league footballer who plays as a prop forward for the Halifax Panthers in the RFL Championship.

He has previously played for Bradford Bulls in the RFL Championship. He has spent time on loan at Castleford Tigers in the Super League, at Newcastle Thunder, Swinton Lions, and London Broncos in the Championship, and at Hunslet in League One.

== Background ==
Okoro was born in Nigeria and moved to England at a young age.

Okoro played junior rugby league for Milford ARLFC. He joined the City of Hull Academy at scholarship level and progressed to the Hull Kingston Rovers academy side from 2020.

== Club career ==
=== Hull Kingston Rovers ===
Okoro was promoted into the Hull KR senior squad in September 2021. He was assigned squad number 32 for the 2022 campaign. After suffering a wrist ligament injury out on loan in May, he was ruled out for the remainder of the season.

At the end of the 2023 season which he spent away on loan, Okoro was allowed to depart Hull KR without having made a first-team appearance.

==== Hunslet (loan) ====
In April 2022, Okoro joined League One club Hunslet on loan alongside his Hull KR teammate Connor Moore. He made three appearances before a wrist injury suffered against Swinton ended his time with the club.

==== Newcastle Thunder (loan) ====
On 7 November 2022, it was announced Okoro would join Newcastle Thunder on a season-long loan in the 2023 RFL Championship. He missed the start of the year through injury but went on to make seven appearances from April to June. In July, he was allowed to depart Newcastle to join Bradford due to limited playing opportunities.

==== Bradford Bulls (loan) ====
In July 2023, Bradford Bulls announced the arrival of Okoro on loan for the rest of the season. He made two appearances, featuring in the Championship play-off semi-final loss to Toulouse.

=== Bradford Bulls ===
Okoro joined Bradford on a permanent basis at the conclusion of his loan deal, signing a one-year deal for 2024. His impressive start to the season in the 1895 Cup attracted the interest of Super League clubs Leeds and Warrington, though he suffered a broken jaw in the opening round of the Championship season. He had made six appearances at the time his departure was confirmed in April.

=== Warrington Wolves ===
On 4 April 2024, Warrington Wolves completed the signing of Okoro with immediate effect. He joined on a three-and-a-half-year contract, with head coach Sam Burgess labelling him "an exciting young prop with a lot of potential." He was named as 18th man against Wigan Warriors in round 13, in between loan spells.

==== Bradford Bulls (loan) ====
Okoro rejoined his former side Bradford on loan from Warrington after completing his permanent move in the opposite direction. He scored his first career try against Swinton on 5 May and made five further appearances for the Bulls.

==== Swinton Lions (loan) ====
In July 2024, Okoro joined Swinton Lions in the Championship on loan from Warrington and made one appearance.

==== Castleford Tigers (loan) ====
On 19 December 2024, it was announced Okoro would join Castleford Tigers on a season-long loan for 2025. He made his Super League debut in the round 4 win against Salford Red Devils, providing an offload for the opening try. In July, having made eight appearances for the Tigers, it was announced Okoro's loan would be cut short to allow him to "pursue first-team opportunities elsewhere."

==== London Broncos (loan) ====
After departing Castleford, Okoro joined London in the Championship with immediate effect on a loan deal for the remainder of the 2025 season.

=== Halifax Panthers ===
On 14 November 2025 it was reported that he had signed for Halifax Panthers in the RFL Championship on a 1-year deal

== Representative career ==
In September 2022, Okoro was called up to the Nigeria national rugby league team for the 2022 MEA Rugby League Championship held in Accra, Ghana. He said "to represent my country is a great honour, and me and my family are so proud." Okoro featured in both of Nigeria's matches against Cameroon and Ghana, scoring one try in each.

In November 2025, he featured for the Nigerian national side when they travelled to Barrow to play Cumbria, where the African side were overrun losing 70-6.

== Club statistics ==
Appearances and points in all competitions by year
Club	Season	Tier	App	T	G	DG	Pts
Hull Kingston Rovers	2022	Super League	0	0	0	0	0
→ Hunslet (loan)	2022	League One	3	0	0	0	0
→ Newcastle Thunder (loan)	2023	Championship	7	0	0	0	0
Bradford Bulls	2023 (Note: On loan from Hull KR in 2023 before joining permanently in 2024)	Championship	2	0	0	0	0
Bradford Bulls	2024 (Note: Was a Bradford player on a permanent deal until April, then rejoined on loan from Warrington from April–August)	Championship	11	1	0	0	4
Bradford Bulls	Total		13	1	0	0	4
Warrington Wolves	2024	Super League	0	0	0	0	0
→ Swinton Lions (loan)	2024	Championship	1	0	0	0	0
→ Castleford Tigers (loan)	2025	Super League	8	0	0	0	0
→ London Broncos (loan)	2025	Championship	5	0	0	0	0
Halifax Panthers	2026	Championship	1	0	0	0	0
Career total			38	1	0	0	4

As of match played 18 January 2026
