= Brett Fulton =

Australian rugby league player

Personal information
- Born: Sydney, New South Wales, Australia

Playing information
Club
| Years | Team | Pld | T | G | FG | P |
|---|---|---|---|---|---|---|
| 1994–95 | Manly Sea Eagles | 2 | 0 | 0 | 0 | 0 |
- Father: Bob Fulton
- Relatives: Scott Fulton (brother); Zac Fulton (nephew)

Brett Fulton is an Australian former professional rugby league footballer and the son of the rugby league Immortal Bob Fulton. Fulton made his first-grade debut for the Manly-Warringah Sea Eagles, coming off the bench in Round 14 of the 1994 NSWRL season, becoming the 398th Manly player to represent the club. In that match, Manly had what was then their second largest ever win with a 61–0 victory over St. George. Fulton played in the second and final first-grade match of his rugby league career in Round 22 of the 1995 ARL season, both games having been played under the coaching of his father.

His brother Scott Fulton also played first-grade for Manly.
