= Scott Fulton =

Australian rugby league player

Personal information
- Full name: Scott Zachary Fulton
- Born: 7 March 1973 (age 53) Sydney, New South Wales, Australia

Playing information
- Position: Hooker
Club
Years	Team	Pld	T	G	FG	P
1993–99	Manly Sea Eagles	49	1	0	0	4
- Source: As of 18 April 1999
- Father: Bob Fulton
- Relatives: Brett Fulton (brother); Zac Fulton (son)

Scott Fulton (born 7 March 1973) is an Australian former rugby league footballer and the son of the rugby league Immortal Bob Fulton.

Fulton made his first-grade debut seven days after his 20th birthday, starting at hooker for the Manly Warringah Sea Eagles in the opening round of the 1993 NSWRL season, becoming the 388th Manly player to represent the club.

After seven seasons and 49 games in the NSWRL, he played his final game in Round 7 of the 1999 season, against Balmain. He later played in France. On his return to Australia he played for Dubbo, winning a competition. He then played for his local club the Coonamble Bears in the Castlereagh Cup.

His brother Brett Fulton also played first-grade for Manly. Scott's son Zac Fulton plays for Manly.
