= Logan Bayliss-Brow =

Scotland international rugby league footballer

Logan Bayliss
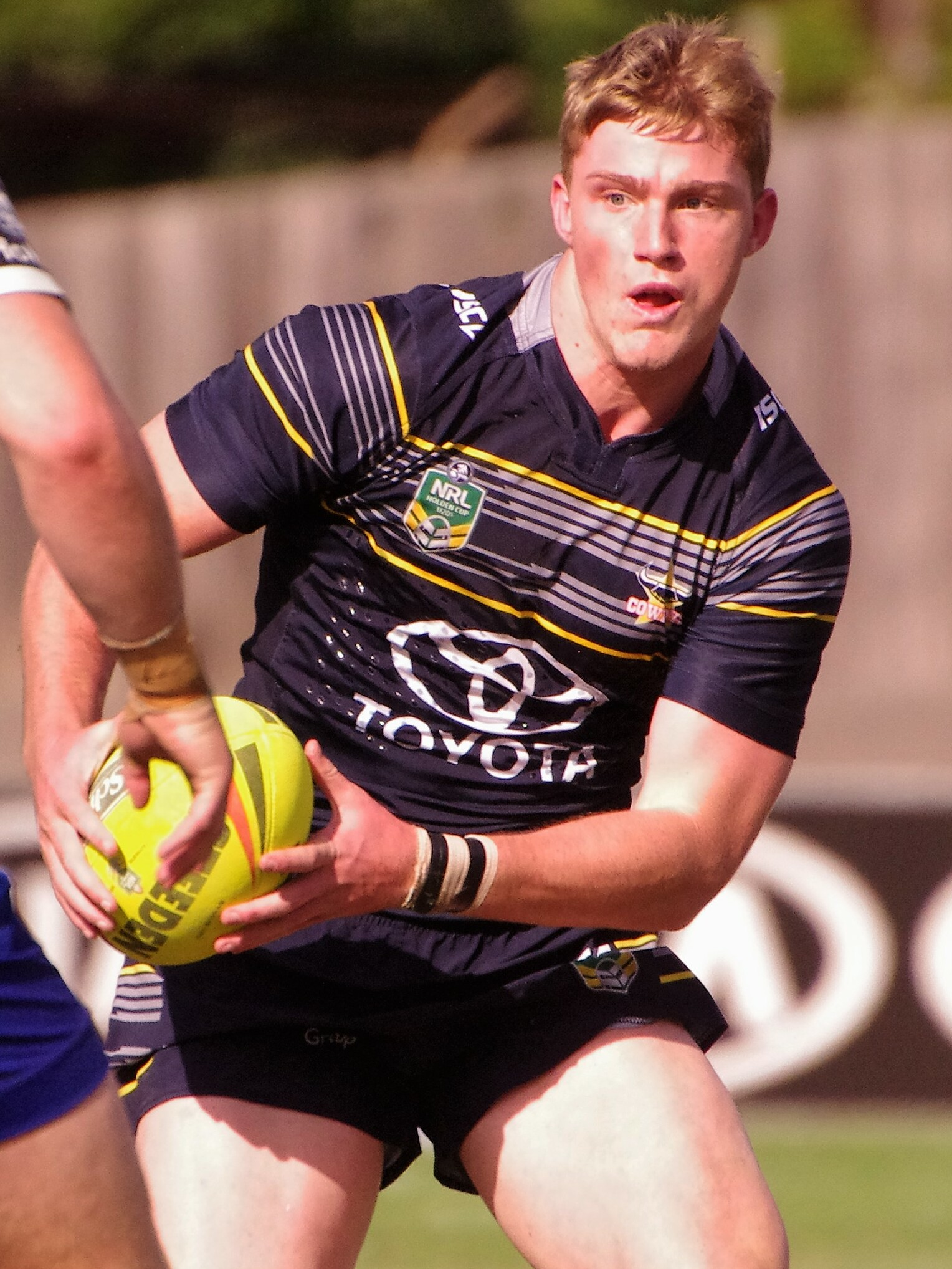

Personal information
- Full name: Logan Bayliss-Brow
- Born: 29 August 1999 (age 27) Nambour, Queensland, Australia
- Height: 194 cm (6 ft 4 in)
- Weight: 107 kg (16 st 12 lb)

Playing information
- Position: Prop
Club
Years	Team	Pld	T	G	FG	P
2024–25	Bradford Bulls	34	3	0	0	0
2024(loan)	→ Batley Bulldogs	1	0	0	0	0
2026–	Gold Coast Titans	0	0	0	0	0
	Total	35	3	0	0	0
Representative
Years	Team	Pld	T	G	FG	P
2022–	Scotland	4	0	0	0	0
- Source: As of 19 November 2026

Logan Bayliss-Brow (born 29 August 1999) is a Scotland international rugby league footballer who plays as a prop for the Gold Coast Titans in the NRL.

== Background ==
Bayliss-Brow was born in Nambour, Queensland, Australia. He is of Scottish descent.

== Playing career ==
=== North Queensland Cowboys ===
Bayliss-Brow played for the North Queensland Cowboys Holden Cup team in 2017. In 2018 he played for the Townsville Blackhawks in the Hastings Deering Colts competition. He was then promoted into the Cowboys NRL squad for the 2019 NRL season on a Development contract. He was allocated to the Mackay Cutters Queensland Cup team for the 2019 season.

=== Brisbane Tigers ===
In 2020, Bayliss-Brow moved to the Brisbane Tigers Queensland Cup team.

=== Souths Logan Magpies ===
Following 2020, he signed with the Souths Logan Magpies and signed a train and trial deal with the Brisbane Broncos for the 2021 season.

=== Brisbane Broncos ===
He then signed a contract with Broncos for the 2022 and 2023 seasons.

Bayliss-Brow represented the Queensland Maroons (U20s) team in 2019 and was 18th man in 2018.

=== Bradford Bulls ===
On 19 June 2024, it was reported that he had signed for Bradford Bulls in the RFL Championship on a 2½-year deal.

=== Gold Coast Titans ===
On 17 December 2025 it was reported that he had signed for Gold Coast Titans in the NRL on a train-and-trial deal. Bayliss-Brow commenced the 2026 season playing for the Gold Coast Titans Queensland Cup feeder side, the Ipswich Jets.

=== International career ===
In 2022, Bayliss-Brow was named in the Scotland squad for the 2021 Rugby League World Cup, and made his debut on 16 October 2022 in the 28–4 defeat to Italy.
