= Harvey Wilson (rugby league) =

English professional rugby league footballer (born 2004)

Personal information
- Full name: Harvey Wilson
- Born: 31 January 2004 (age 22) England
- Height: 5 ft 11 in (1.81 m)
- Weight: 14 st 13 lb (95 kg)

Playing information
- Position: Loose forward, Second-row, Prop
Club
Years	Team	Pld	T	G	FG	P
2023–24	Wigan Warriors	0	0	0	0	0
2023(loan)	→ Oldham	8	2	0	0	8
2024(loan)	→ Widnes Vikings	0	0	0	0	0
2024(loan)	→ Bradford Bulls	5	1	0	0	4
2024–25	Salford Red Devils	29	3	0	0	12
2026–	Catalans Dragons	17	1	0	0	4
	Total	59	7	0	0	28
- Source: As of 24 October 2026

Harvey Wilson (born 31 January 2004) is an English professional rugby league footballer who plays as a loose forward, second-row or prop for the Catalans Dragons in the Super League.

He has previously been contracted to the Wigan Warriors in the Betfred Super League, and spent time on loan from Wigan at Oldham in RFL League One, as well as the Widnes Vikings and the Bradford Bulls in the RFL Championship. Wilson has also played for the Salford Red Devils in the Super League.

== Background ==
Wilson came through the Wigan Warriors Academy system. In 2023 he was part of the club's winning reserves Grand Final team.

== Career ==
Wilson spent time on loan from Wigan at Oldham, spending a large part of the 2023 season with the League One club.

In January 2024 he was sent on loan by Wigan to the Widnes Vikings in the RFL Championship.

Wilson joined the Bradford Bulls on loan in the RFL Championship in March 2024.

He joined the Salford Red Devils in the Super League in May 2024.

Wilson joined the Catalans Dragons on a two-year deal with in the French side ahead of the 2026 Super League season.
