= Zac Fulton =

Australian rugby league footballer

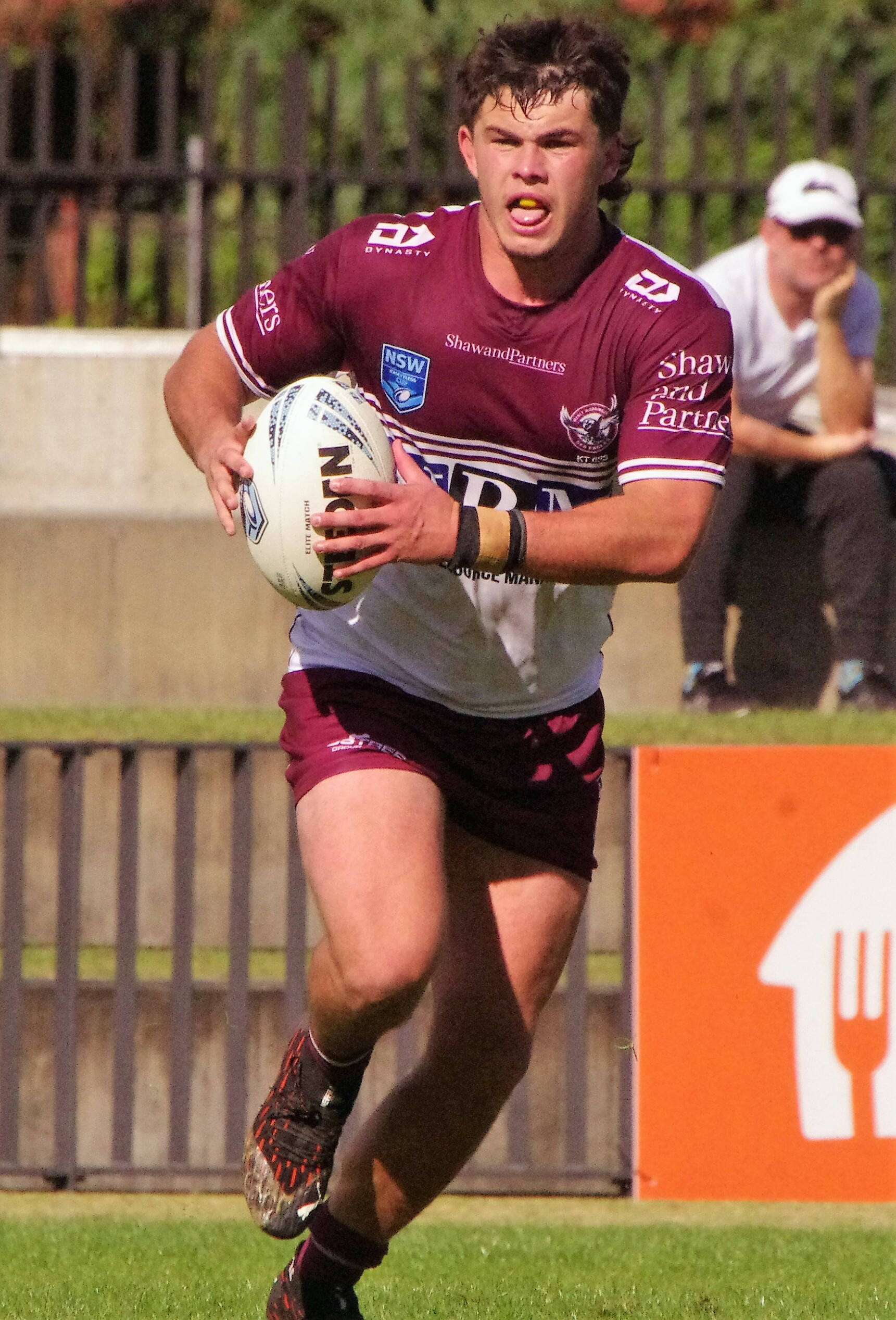

Personal information
- Full name: Zac Fulton
- Born: 14 August 2001 (age 25) Sydney, New South Wales, Australia
- Height: 6 ft 0 in (1.83 m)
- Weight: 14 st 13 lb (95 kg)

Playing information
- Position: Second-row, Centre, Loose forward
Club
Years	Team	Pld	T	G	FG	P
2022–23	Manly Sea Eagles	1	1	0	0	0
2024–	Bradford Bulls	79	23	0	0	92
	Total	80	24	0	0	92
Representative
Years	Team	Pld	T	G	FG	P
2024	Indigenous All Stars	1	0	0	0	0
- As of 27 May 2026
- Father: Scott Fulton
- Relatives: Brett Fulton (uncle); Bob Fulton (grandfather)

Zac Fulton (born 14 August 2001) is an Australian rugby league footballer who plays as a second-row forward for the Bradford Bulls in the Super League.

== Background ==
Fulton made history by being the first third generation of his family to play first grade at the one club, being the son of Scott and grandson of Rugby league Immortal, Bob.

He is of British and part Aboriginal heritage, specifically English and Australian Aboriginal descent.

== Playing career ==
=== Manly-Warringah Sea Eagles ===
Fulton made his first grade debut in round 20 of the 2022 NRL season for Manly against the Sydney Roosters.

=== Bradford Bulls ===
On 5 March 2024 it was reported that he had signed for Bradford in the RFL Championship on a one-year deal. On 5 December, Fulton re-signed with the club on a two year deal.
