= Tom Garratt =

English rugby league footballer

Personal information
- Full name: Thomas Garratt
- Born: 25 October 1994 (age 31) Halifax, West Yorkshire, England
- Height: 6 ft 5 in (1.96 m)
- Weight: 17 st 5 lb (110 kg)

Playing information
- Position: Prop
Club
Years	Team	Pld	T	G	FG	P
2019–21	Dewsbury Rams	50	9	0	0	36
2022	Hull Kingston Rovers	6	0	0	0	0
	Total	58	10	0	0	36
- Source: As of 7 March 2023

Tom Garratt (born 25 October 1994) is a former rugby league footballer who last played as a prop for Hull Kingston Rovers in the Super League.

In 2022, he made his Hull KR Super League début against the Huddersfield Giants. He made six appearances for Hull KR before being released from the club in August 2022. In February 2023, he announced his retirement from rugby league.
