= Franklin Pele =

New Zealand rugby league footballer

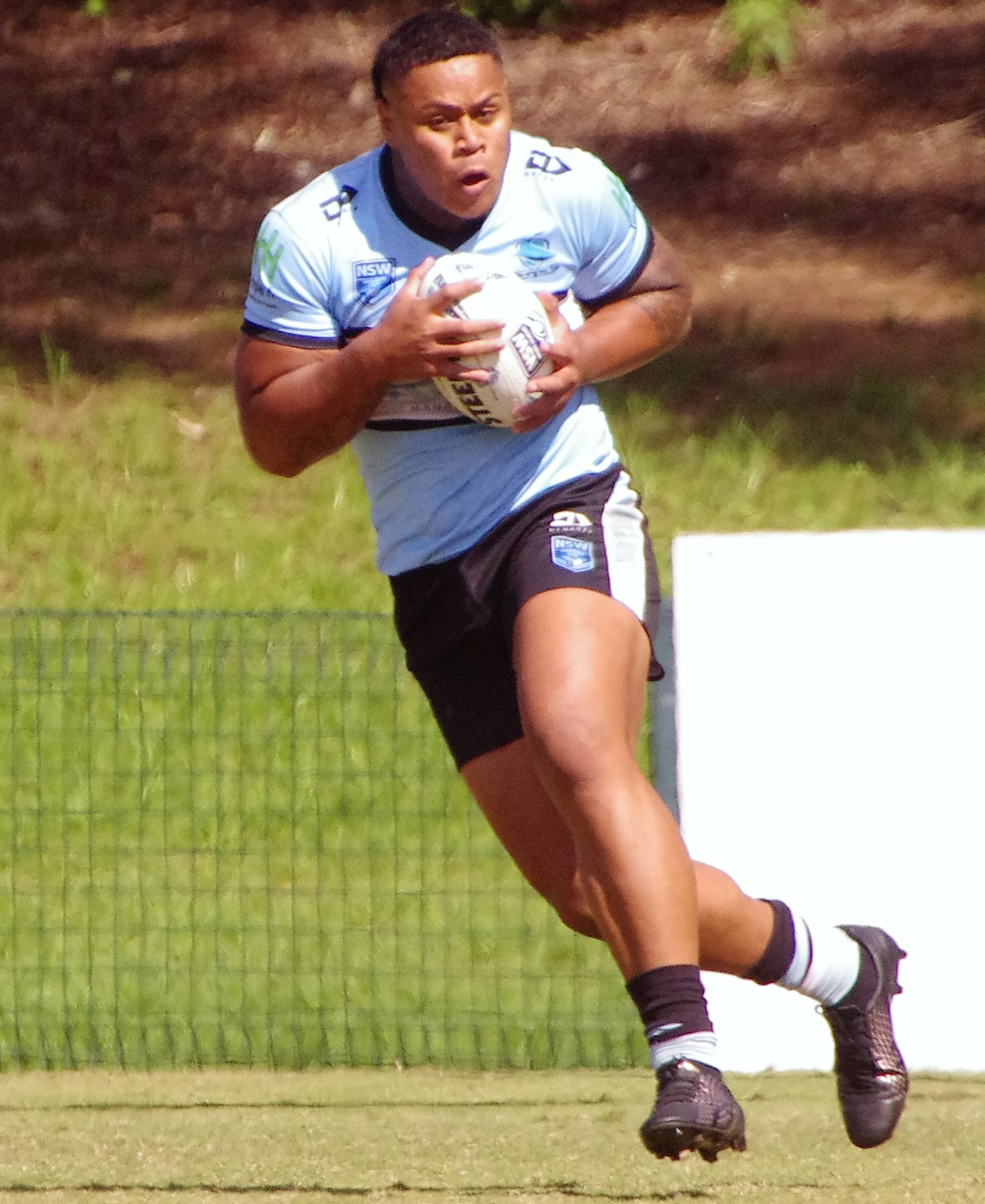

Personal information
- Full name: Franklin Pele Poutasi
- Born: 18 December 2000 (age 25) Auckland, New Zealand
- Height: 6 ft 4 in (1.94 m)
- Weight: 20 st 11 lb (132 kg)

Playing information

Rugby league
- Position: Prop
Club
Years	Team	Pld	T	G	FG	P
2021	Cronulla Sharks	1	0	0	0	0
2023	Canterbury Bulldogs	6	0	0	0	0
2024	Hull F.C.	9	1	0	0	4
2024(loan)	→York Knights	2	1	0	0	4
2024–25	Bradford Bulls	27	11	0	0	44
2026–	South Sydney Rabbitohs	0	0	0	0	0
	Total	45	13	0	0	52

Rugby union
Club
Years	Team	Pld	T	G	FG	P
2025	RC Narbonne	4	1	0	0	5
- Source: As of 17 September 2026

Franklin Pele Poutasi (born 18 December 2000) is a New Zealand professional rugby league and rugby union footballer who plays as a prop for South Sydney Rabbitohs in the National Rugby League.

He previously played for the Cronulla-Sutherland Sharks in the NRL and for Hull F.C. in the Super League.

== Background ==
Pele was born in Auckland, New Zealand, and is of Samoan and American Samoan descent. When Franklin was the age of seven, his family moved from South Auckland to settle in Sydney, Australia.

He played junior rugby league for the Otahuhu Leopards in Auckland, and St Patrick's Sutherland and the Gymea Gorillas in Sydney.

He attended Endeavour Sports High School and played for the Australian Schoolboys in 2018.

== Playing career ==
=== Cronulla-Sutherland Sharks ===
In round 12 of the 2021 NRL season, Pele made his debut for Cronulla-Sutherland against the Gold Coast. He was later sidelined for 9–12 weeks after undergoing surgery for an injury sustained in a reserve grade game, effectively ending his debut season.

=== Canterbury-Bankstown Bulldogs ===
In 2023, Pele joined Canterbury. He made his club debut in round 1 of the 2023 NRL season against Manly at Brookvale Oval. Pele made a total of six appearances for the club. On 6 September 2023, Pele signed a two-year deal with English side Hull FC.

=== Hull F.C. ===
In round 1 of the 2024 Super League season, Pele made his club debut for Hull F.C. against arch-rivals Hull Kingston Rovers but was sent off in the 39th minute for a deliberate high tackle. On 20 February 2024, Pele was suspended for three matches in relation to the tackle and fined £750. In round 5 of the 2024 Super League season, Pele was given a yellow card for a dangerous high tackle during the Hull's 54-4 defeat against Leigh. Pele was later suspended for one game. In round 7 of the season, Pele scored his first try for Hull in their 56–22 loss to Huddersfield.

=== York Knights (loan) ===
On 16 May 2024 it was reported that he had signed for York RLFC in the RFL Championship on a two-week loan. York won both matches during his loan period and Pele scored a try in the match against Swinton Lions.

=== Bradford Bulls ===
On 19 June 2024, it was reported that he had signed for Bradford in the RFL Championship for the remainder of the 2024 season after being released by Hull F.C..

On 10 May 2025, it was reported that he had left Bradford to join a, as yet unnamed, 3rd tier French rugby union club, leaving Bradford considering whether to launch legal action against the contracted player.

=== RC Narbonne ===
On 13 June 2025 it was announced that he would switch codes to play rugby union for French side RC Narbonne

=== South Sydney Rabbitohs ===
On 6 December 2025 it was reported that he had signed for South Sydney Rabbitohs in the NRL

== Statistics ==
=== NRL/Super League ===
Statistics are correct as of the middle of the 2025 season

Season	Team	Matches	T	Pts
2021	Cronulla Sharks	1	0	0
2023	Canterbury-Bankstown Bulldogs	6		
2024	Hull FC	9	1	4
2024	York Knights (loan)	2	1	4
2024	Bradford Bulls	15	9	36
2025	Bradford Bulls	11	1	4
2026	South Sydney Rabbitohs			
Career totals		45	13	44
