= Harvey Makin =

English rugby league footballer

Personal information
- Full name: Harvey Makin
- Born: 17 November 2003 (age 22) Wigan, Greater Manchester, England

Playing information
- Position: Prop, Loose forward
Club
Years	Team	Pld	T	G	FG	P
2023–26	Wigan Warriors	1	0	0	0	0
2023(loan)	→ Oldham	2	1	0	0	4
2023(loan)	→ London Broncos	1	0	0	0	0
2023(loan)	→ Barrow Raiders	5	0	0	0	0
2024(loan)	→ Barrow Raiders	9	1	0	0	4
2024(loan)	→ London Broncos	6	0	0	0	0
2024(loan)	→ Bradford Bulls	11	3	0	0	12
2025(loan)	→ Salford Red Devils	6	0	0	0	0
2026(loan)	→ Oldham	5	1	0	0	4
2026(loan)	→ Barrow Raiders	3	0	0	0	0
	Total	49	6	0	0	24
- Source: As of 1 October 2026

Harvey Makin (born 17 November 2003) is an English semi-professional rugby league footballer who last played as a prop or loose forward for the Wigan Warriors in the Betfred Super League.

He has spent time on loan from Wigan at Oldham in RFL League One and the Barrow Raiders and the Bradford Bulls in the RFL Championship. Makin has also played on loan at the London Broncos in both the Championship and the Super League, as well the Salford Red Devils in the top flight.

== Background ==
Makin was born in Wigan, Greater Manchester, England.

He played for Wigan St Judes as a junior. He played for Lancashire in the Origin series.

== Career ==
=== Wigan Warriors ===
Makin made his professional debut in June 2023 on loan at the London Broncos against the Batley Bulldogs in the Championship.

Makin spent the first half of 2024 on a second loan spell at the London Broncos where he made his Super League debut. He was recalled half way through the season and sent on loan again to the Bradford Bulls.

In July 2025 he made his Wigan Warriors debut in the Super League against the Huddersfield Giants.

=== Oldham RLFC (loan) ===
On 10 March 2026 he returned to parent club Wigan Warriors from his season-long loan at Oldham RLFC

=== Barrow Raiders (loan) ===
On 20 March 2026 it was reported that he had signed for semi-professional side Barrow Raiders in the RFL Championship on short-term loan
