= Eliot Peposhi =

Albania international rugby league footballer

Personal information
- Full name: Eliot Peposhi
- Born: 5 August 2004 (age 22) Wigan, England

Playing information
- Position: Prop, Second-row, Loose forward
Club
Years	Team	Pld	T	G	FG	P
2020–23	St Helens Reserves	0	0	0	0	0
2024–	Bradford Bulls	30	2	0	0	8
2025(loan)	→ Batley Bulldogs	3	0	0	0	0
2025(loan)	→ Dewsbury Rams	1	0	0	0	0
	Total	34	2	0	0	8
Representative
Years	Team	Pld	T	G	FG	P
2023	Albania	1	2	3	0	14
- Source: As of 12 August 2026

Eliot Peposhi (born 5 August 2004) is an Albania international rugby league footballer who plays as a second-row forward for the Bradford Bulls in the Super League.

== Background ==
His father played internationally for Albania against the Great Britain Students Pioneers side in 2019, and was the head coach of the national side in 2023 in their test against the Netherlands.

== Playing career ==
=== St Helens ===
Peposhi was signed by St Helens at 16 years old in 2020. He initially penned a two year deal with the option for a third. In 2023 he was part of the St Helens’ Reserves side that reached the Grand Final in 2023.

=== Bradford Bulls ===
Ahead of the 2024 season, he joined Bradford Bulls on trial. He featured in both pre-season matches impressing then Head Coach Eamon O’Carroll landing him a permanent one year deal. After a strong first season Peposhi signed a 3 year contract in November 2024.

In March 2026 in a match against his former club, he was shown a red card by referee Jack Smith after hitting George Delaney high and with the shoulder, resulting in a Grade E charge and a 3 match ban.

=== Albania ===
He made his debut for the Albanian national side on the 7 October 2023, starting at loose-forward against the Netherlands in a 58-18 loss, scoring Albania’s first points in a men’s senior international. He scored 3 goals and 2 tries.
