= Bob Fulton =

Australia international rugby league footballer and coach (1947–2021)

Bob Fulton AM
Personal information
- Full name: Robert Fulton
- Born: 1 December 1947 Stockton Heath, Cheshire, England
- Died: 23 May 2021 (aged 73) Darlinghurst, New South Wales, Australia

Playing information
- Position: Centre, Five-eighth
Club
Years	Team	Pld	T	G	FG	P
1965	Wests (Illawarra)
1966–76	Manly	151	129	10	57	510
1969–70	Warrington	16	16	0	1	50
1977–79	Eastern Suburbs	50	18	16	2	88
	Total	217	163	26	60	648
Representative
Years	Team	Pld	T	G	FG	P
1967–78	City Firsts	17	13	3	0	46
1967–78	New South Wales	16	14	0	0	42
1968–78	Australia	35	25	0	6	82

Coaching information
Club
Years	Team	Gms	W	D	L	W%
1980–82	Eastern Suburbs	78	48	4	26	62
1983–88	Manly	152	99	3	50	65
1993–99	Manly	153	105	3	45	69
	Total	383	252	10	121	66
Representative
Years	Team	Gms	W	D	L	W%
1989–98	Australia	39	32	1	6	82
	City Firsts (September side) 1967
- Relatives: Brett Fulton (son); Scott Fulton (son); Zac Fulton (grandson)

Robert Fulton AM (1 December 1947 – 23 May 2021), also nicknamed "Bozo", was an Australian rugby league footballer, coach and later commentator. Fulton played, coached, selected for and commentated on the game with great success at the highest levels and has been named amongst Australia's greatest rugby league players of the 20th century.

As a player, Fulton won three premierships with the Manly-Warringah Sea Eagles in the 1970s, the last as captain. He represented the Australia national team thirty-five times, seven as captain. He had a long coaching career at the first grade level, taking Manly to premiership victories in 1987 and 1996. He coached the Australia national team in thirty-nine Tests. He was a New South Wales State selector and a national selector. He was a radio commentator with 2GB at the time of his death in 2021, aged 73.

In 1981, he was selected as one of the initial four post-war "Immortals" of the Australian game and, in 2008, he was named in Australia's team of the century.

== Background ==
Fulton was born in Stockton Heath, a civil parish of Warrington, in the English county of Cheshire. He moved to Australia with his family when he was four years old.

== Playing career ==
At 18 years of age, Fulton made his senior football debut in the Illawarra Rugby League with Western Suburbs in 1965 and went on to represent Country Seconds.

=== Manly-Warringah Sea Eagles ===
Fulton was signed to Sydney's Manly-Warringah by club secretary Ken Arthurson after being spotted by John Hobbs (Manly talent scout) and started his NSWRFL first grade career in 1966 aged 19. As a centre or five-eighth Fulton made an immediate impact. He earned State representative honours in 1967 and the following year became the youngest ever captain in Grand Final history when he led Manly in the 1968 decider against Souths.

Fulton made 219 appearances for the Manly club between 1966 and 1976. He scored 520 points (129 tries, 10 goals and 56 field goals) – the club's record try tally until Steve Menzies went one better in 2006. Fulton won premierships with Manly in 1972 (also the League's top try-scorer this season), 1973 and 1976. In the 1973 bloodbath against Cronulla he took control of the game scoring two tries to take the side to victory.

At the end of the 1976 season Fulton caused a sensation in Sydney rugby league circles when he left Manly and signed a 3-year deal with the Eastern Suburbs club. He left Manly holding the club record for most tries.

=== Warrington Wolves ===
Following the 1969 NSWRFL season, Fulton accepted an offer to play a season with Warrington, near where he was born, in the 1969–70 English season. Fulton played 16 games for Warrington, scoring 16 tries and kicking 1 field goal before returning to Manly for the 1970 season.

=== Eastern Suburbs Roosters ===
Fulton played 56 matches for the Eastern Suburbs club, mainly at five-eighth. In his first season there Fulton was a member of the side that won the pre-season cup and was the club's leading try scorer. In 1978 he was a member of the Easts side that defeated St George in the mid-week cup final. In 1979, Fulton was appointed captain-coach at the Roosters. A chronic knee injury saw him retire after just eight games that year.

=== Representative career ===
Fulton made his international début for Australia in the 1968 Rugby League World Cup and played in the final at the Sydney Cricket Ground. Playing as a five-eighth, Fulton won his first of three World Cups when Australia defeated France 20–2. In 1967, two NSW City v NSW Country fixtures were held to formline Kangaroo selections at season's end. The main game in May outlined the majority of the NSW players penned for the squad, whilst the second game in September was played to give fringe NSW players a chance for final selection. Fulton was selected at only 19 years of age to captain/coach the September City side that lost to Country 16-12. Whilst he was disappointed at missing out on the 1967 Kangaroo Squad as second string five-eighth to Tony Branson from the Nowra Warriors, he did play for the next eleven seasons as a consistent national representative.

He toured New Zealand in 1971, was on the 1973 and 1978 Kangaroo Tours, played in home Ashes series against Great Britain in 1970 and 1974 and the home series against New Zealand in 1972 and 1978. He participated in Australian squads at four World cups – 1968, 1970 (including Australia's 12–7 World Cup final win over Great Britain at Headingley), 1972 (including Australia's 10–all draw with Great Britain in the World Cup final in Lyon, France, though the Lions would win the tournament as they had finished on top of the ladder) and 1975 (won by Australia). He was named as the World Cup Man of the Series in 1970. The same knee injury that eventually forced his retirement as a player in 1979 kept him from Australia's winning 1977 Rugby League World Cup squad.

He was the Australian captain in the 2nd and 3rd Tests of the 1978 series against New Zealand and in all five Tests of the 1978 Kangaroo Tour, though that included the 2–0 series loss to France at the end of the tour, the last time Australia would lose a series or tournament until the 2005 Rugby League Tri-Nations. Fulton captained his country to a total of 4 wins and 3 losses.

On both of his Kangaroo Tours Fulton was the leading try scorer – with 20 tries from 5 Tests and 9 tour matches in 1973 and 9 tries from 5 Tests and 10 tour matches in 1978.

All told he appeared in 16 representative matches for New South Wales. He represented Australia in 20 Test matches, 15 World Cup matches and 22 minor internationals whilst on tour.

== Post playing ==
=== Coaching career ===
After retiring as a player at Easts, Fulton became coach of the Roosters. His was one of the few clubs opposed to the State of Origin concept when it first began and he called it the "non-event of the century". At the end of his first season as coach, he took Easts to the 1980 Grand Final where they were beaten by the Canterbury-Bankstown Bulldogs. He went on to coach the Roosters for two more seasons.

He returned to Manly as coach in 1983 and in that same year took them to a Grand Final against the Parramatta Eels where the club was unsuccessful for the second year running. In 1987, he guided the Paul Vautin-captained Sea Eagles side to a premiership victory over the Canberra Raiders in the last Grand Final played at the Sydney Cricket Ground, becoming in the process the first person at Manly to win premierships both as captain and as coach. Following the grand final victory, he travelled with Manly to England for the 1987 World Club Challenge against their champions, Wigan, though Manly-Warringah were beaten in a tryless game 8–2.

In 1989, Fulton succeeded Don Furner as coach of the Australian national side. He guided the team in 39 Tests between 1989 and 1998 to 32 victories, one draw and six losses, including the successful 1990 and 1994 Kangaroo tours, as well as winning both the 1992 and 1995 World Cup finals.

In three consecutive three-Test Ashes series (1990, 1992 and 1994) as well as the 1991 Trans-Tasman Test series, the Australians were taken to a deciding Test and emerged victorious.

In 1993 Fulton returned to Manly as coach and he guided the club to three successive Grand Finals from 1995. Fulton won his second and last premiership as a coach in 1996 when in their 50th season the Manly-Warringah club defeated St George 20–8 in a win at the Sydney Football Stadium.

=== Selector ===
From 1999, Fulton was a selector of the New South Wales and Australian sides.

=== Commentator ===
From 1997, Fulton was a member of the Continuous Call Team, first on radio 2UE, and later on 2GB with Ray Hadley, Erin Molan, Darryl Brohman, Mark Levy, David Morrow and Mark Riddell .

=== National service ===
Fulton was conscripted into the Army in 1968 and allotted to artillery. He was effectively exempted from active service by being posted to the School of Artillery in Manly NSW as a Physical Training Instructor (PTI), enabling him to pursue his professional football career while fulfilling his national service obligation. He also spent time on HMAS Sydney taking the troops through PT during the voyage to South Vietnam.

== Accolades ==
In 1981, he was selected by the publication Rugby League Week as one of the initial four post-war "Immortals" of the Australian game alongside Churchill, Raper and Gasnier. Fulton was also inducted into the Sport Australia Hall of Fame in 1985. In 1994 Fulton was inducted as a Member of the Order of Australia "for service to rugby league football" and in 2000 he received the Australian Sports Medal. In 2002 he was inducted into the Australian Rugby League Hall of Fame.

In February 2008, Fulton was named in the list of Australia's 100 Greatest Players (1908–2007) which was commissioned by the NRL and ARL to celebrate the code's centenary year in Australia. Fulton went on to be named as an interchange player in Australian rugby league's Team of the Century. Announced on 17 April 2008, the team is the panel's majority choice for each of the thirteen starting positions and four interchange players. Respected rugby league commentator Roy Masters, believes he was left off the starting team due to his versatility, making it difficult to put him in just in one position.

In 2008 New South Wales announced their rugby league team of the century also, naming Fulton as a five-eighth.

He was made a life member of the Sydney Cricket Ground and a plaque in the Walk of Honour there commemorates his career. He was a member of the Order of Australia (AM).

Fulton is one of only two people to have gone on four Kangaroo Tours. Fulton toured as a player in 1973 and 1978 and as team coach in 1990 and 1994. The other is Mal Meninga who made four tours as a player on the unbeaten 1982 and 1986 tours and as the team captain under Fulton's coaching in both 1990 and 1994. He is also the only person to have captained and coached Kangaroos touring teams on separate tours.

== Personal life and death ==
Fulton was married to Anne until his death. The couple had two sons and a daughter – Scott, Brett and Kristie Fulton. Both sons also played first grade for Manly.

Fulton, aged 73, died of cancer on 23 May 2021 at St Vincent's Hospital in Darlinghurst, Sydney. A state funeral was offered by premier of New South Wales Gladys Berejiklian.

He was laid to rest at St Mary's Cathedral in Sydney on 4 June 2021, with hundreds of Australian sporting and media personalities in attendance.

== Sources ==
- Whiticker, Alan (2004) Captaining the Kangaroos, New Holland, Sydney
- Andrews, Malcolm (2006) The ABC of Rugby League Austn Broadcasting Corpn, Sydney
- Hadfield, Dave (23 October 1992) "Fulton plays honorary consul" The Independent (UK)

Sporting positions
Preceded by Greg Pierce; 1978	Captain Australia; 1978	Succeeded by George Peponis; 1979-1980
