= Eribe Doro =

English professional rugby league footballer

Bernard Doro
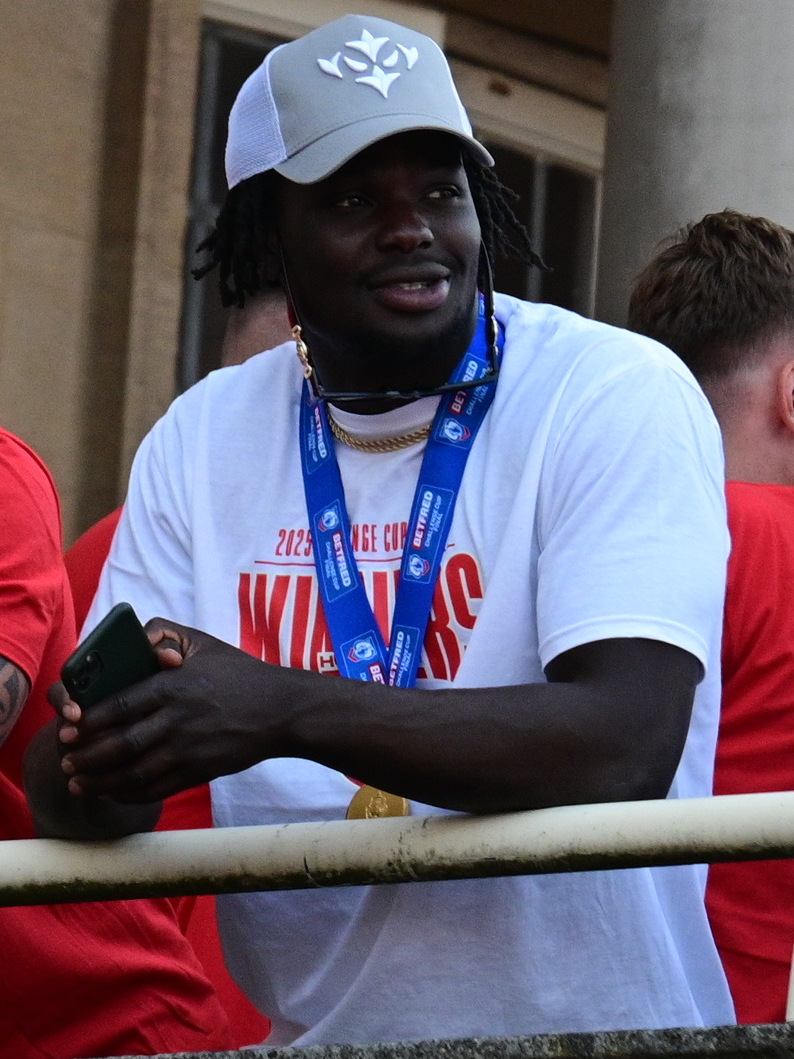

Personal information
- Full name: Bernard Eribe Doro
- Born: 26 March 2001 (age 25) Derker, Greater Manchester, England
- Height: 6 ft 0 in (1.83 m)
- Weight: 15 st 8 lb (99 kg)

Playing information
- Position: Prop
Club
Years	Team	Pld	T	G	FG	P
2020–22	Warrington Wolves	4	1	0	0	4
2021(loan)	→ Widnes Vikings	31	1	0	0	4
2022(loan)	→ Widnes Vikings	24	2	0	0	8
2023	Halifax Panthers	8	4	0	0	16
2023–24	Bradford Bulls	31	3	0	0	12
2025	Hull Kingston Rovers	9	0	0	0	0
2025(loan)	→ Bradford Bulls	6	2	0	0	8
2026–	Bradford Bulls	5	0	0	0	0
	Total	118	13	0	0	52
- Source: As of 13 September 2025

Eribe Doro (born 26 March 2001) is a professional rugby league footballer who plays as a prop for the Bradford Bulls in the Super League.

== Background ==
Doro is of Nigerian descent. He went to The Blue Coat School, Oldham.

Doro played for Saddleworth Rangers as a junior before signing with the Warrington Wolves academy.

== Career ==
=== Warrington Wolves ===
Doro made his Super League début in round 12 of the 2020 Super League season, for the Warrington Wolves against the Castleford Tigers.

In round 11 of the 2021 Super League season, he scored his first try in the Super League during Warrington's 44-18 victory over Leigh.

==== Widnes Vikings (loan) ====
Doro was loaned to Widnes Vikings in the RFL Championship for the 2021 season, this was extended for the 2022 season without a call back option.

=== Halifax Panthers ===
Doro signed for Halifax Panthers in the RFL Championship for the 2023 season.

=== Bradford Bulls ===
On 3 August 2023, Doro transferred to Bradford Bulls in the RFL Championship.

=== Hull Kingston Rovers ===
Ahead of the 2025 season, on 27 June 2024, Doro signed for Hull Kingston Rovers in the Super League on a 2-year deal. Doro was named in the club's match day squad for the 2025 Challenge Cup final, and was on the bench as the 18th man. KR won the game 8-6.

==== Bradford Bulls (loan) ====
During the 2025 season, Doro spent two two-week loans at Bradford, starting 17 April and 2 July respectively.

=== Return to Bradford Bulls ===
On 28 October 2025, Doro returned to Bradford on permanent bases, signing a two year deal for the recently promoted Super League club.
