= Jayden Okunbor =

Australian rugby league footballer

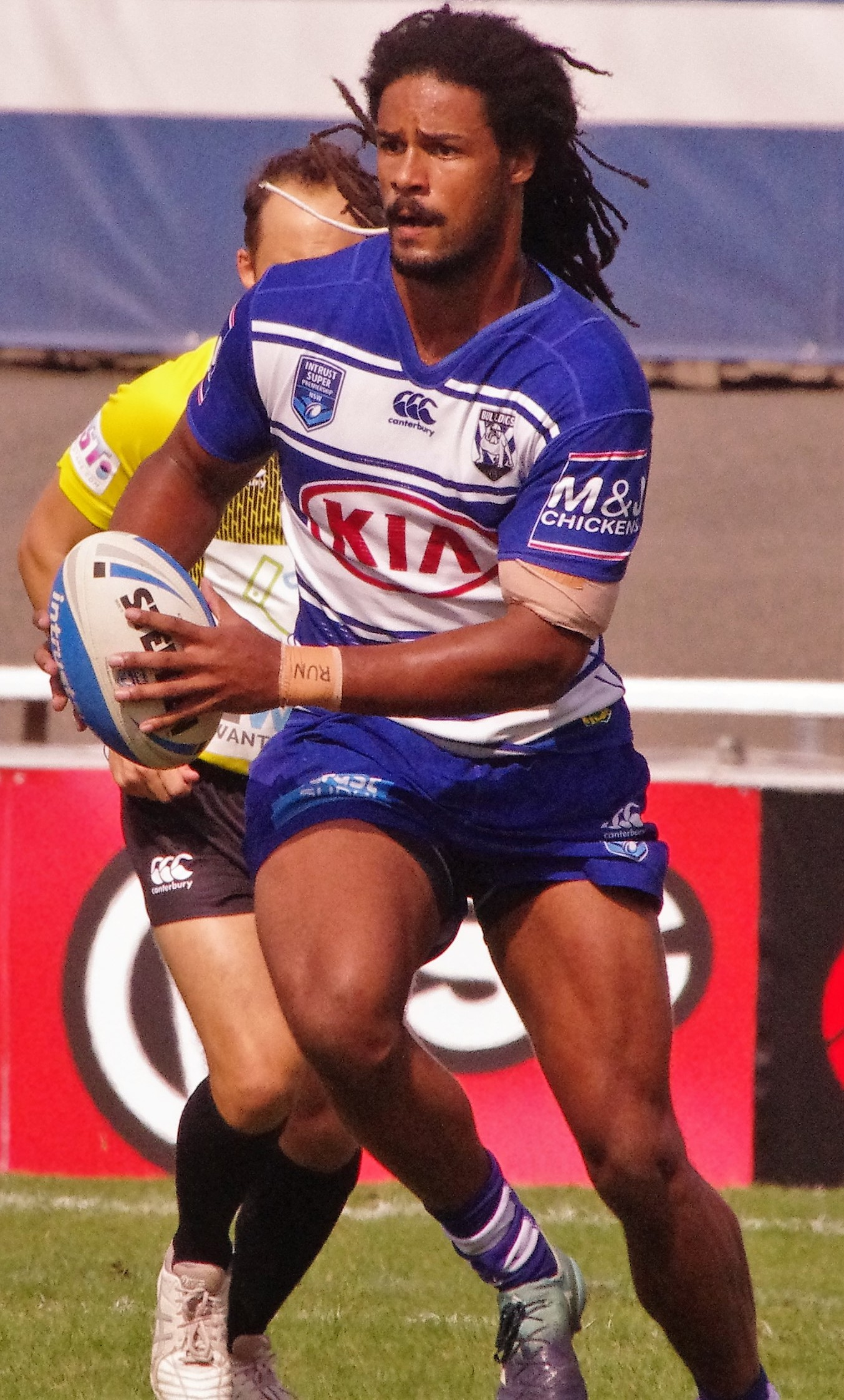

Personal information
- Born: 2 March 1997 (age 29) Sydney, New South Wales, Australia
- Height: 6 ft 5 in (1.96 m)
- Weight: 17 st 0 lb (108 kg)

Playing information
- Position: Wing, Centre, Second-row
Club
Years	Team	Pld	T	G	FG	P
2019–23	Canterbury Bulldogs	45	15	0	0	60
2024	Hull F.C.	8	1	0	0	4
2024(loan)	→ Bradford Bulls	5	3	0	0	12
2024–	Bradford Bulls	51	31	0	0	124
	Total	109	50	0	0	200
- Source: As of 27 May 2026

Jayden Okunbor (born 2 March 1997) is an Australian professional rugby league footballer who plays as a winger and second-row forward for the Bradford Bulls in the Super League.

== Background ==
Okunbor was born in Sydney, New South Wales, Australia, and is of Zimbabwean and Nigerian descent on his father's side.

Okunbor played his junior football for the Milperra Colts and attended Picnic Point High School before being signed by the Canterbury-Bankstown Bulldogs.

== Playing career ==
=== Early career ===
Okunbor played in the Bulldogs Under-20s team in 2015–2017.

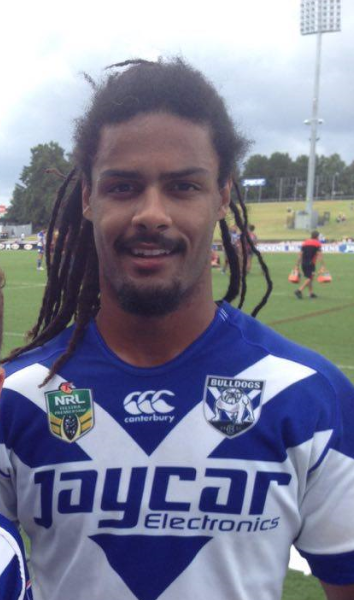
Okunbor after playing a trial match for the Bulldogs against the Melbourne Storm at Belmore Oval in February 2016

Okunbor spent 2018 playing in the Bulldogs 2018 NSW Cup premiership winning team. On 23 September 2018, Okunbor played on the wing in the Bulldogs NSW Cup Grand Final against the Newtown Jets in the 18–12 victory at Leichhardt Oval. In the following week, on 30 September 2018, Okunbor played on the Wing in the State Championship Final against Queensland Cup winners the Redcliffe Dolphins, scoring a try in the 42–18 win.

=== 2019 ===
Okunbor made his National Rugby League (NRL) debut in round 3 of the 2019 NRL season for the Canterbury-Bankstown Bulldogs against the Wests Tigers, playing on the wing and having a solid match registering 214 metres in Canterbury's 22–8 win at Campbelltown Stadium. In the next match in Round 4 against the Melbourne Storm, Okunbor had a powerhouse performance, scoring his first NRL career try, and ran for a whopping 290 metres even busting through 2 tackles from Storm captain Cameron Smith during Canterbury's unlucky 18–16 loss at AAMI Park. On 29 April 2019, Okunbor was rewarded with a 2-year extension with Canterbury to the end of the 2021 season.

On 21 May, Okunbor was ruled out for 6 weeks after suffering a toe ligament injury in Canterbury's Round 10 victory over the Gold Coast where Okunbor had scored 2 tries.

Okunbor made a total of 10 appearances for Canterbury in the 2019 NRL season as the club finished 12th on the table. At one stage, Canterbury-Bankstown found themselves sitting last on the table and in real danger of finishing with the wooden spoon. However, for the third straight season, Canterbury achieved four upset victories in a row over Penrith, the Wests Tigers, South Sydney and Parramatta who were all competing for a place in the finals series and were higher on the table. Pay was credited with the late season revival as the side focused heavily on defence.

=== 2020 ===
After being reinstated to the Canterbury club, Okunbor played his first game of the 2020 NRL season in round 18 against Manly-Warringah where Canterbury lost 32–20.

=== 2021 ===
Okunbor missed the first half of the 2021 NRL season due to an injury to his Anterior Cruciate Ligament, suffered in Canterbury's final game of the 2020 NRL season against the Penrith Panthers. He played his first game in Round 18 and scored a try in Canterbury's 32–24 loss to the South Sydney Rabbitohs.

On 20 July, the Canterbury club announced that Okunbor had re-signed a contract for a further two-years, keeping him at the club until the end of 2023.

Okunbor made a total of seven appearances for Canterbury and scored five tries in the 2021 NRL season as the club finished last and claimed the Wooden Spoon.

=== 2022 ===
Okunbor was limited to only six matches for Canterbury in the 2022 NRL season as the club finished 12th on the table. Okunbor played for Canterbury in their 2022 NSW Cup Grand Final loss to Penrith.

=== 2023 ===
In round 5 of the 2023 NRL season, Okunbor was sent to the sin bin for a hip drop tackle during Canterbury's 15-14 golden point extra-time victory over North Queensland. In round 12, Okunbor scored the winning try for Canterbury with less than two minutes remaining as they defeated the Gold Coast 20–18. On 25 August, Okunbor signed a contract to join English side Hull F.C. ahead of the 2024 Super League season.

=== 2024 & 2025 ===
Okunbor made his club debut for Hull F.C. against arch-rivals Hull Kingston Rovers in round 1 of the 2024 Super League season. Hull F.C. would go on to lose the match 22-0.

On 12 May 2024 it was reported that he had signed for Bradford in the RFL Championship on short-term loan

On 13 August 2024, it was confirmed that the move to Bradford was permanent. He later signed a new two year deal that coincided with Bradford's return to the Super League.

=== 2026 ===
On 25 February, it was announced that Okunbor would miss around three months with a knee injury.

== Controversy ==
On 10 March 2020, Okunbor was stood down by Canterbury just two days before the start of the 2020 NRL season after it was alleged he met with two women during a pre-season trip to Port Macquarie earlier in March along with teammate Corey Harawira-Naera. Whilst a sexual encounter was alleged to occur, the women were of the age of consent and there was no criminal investigation pending. Both players were asked to "show cause" why the NRL should not cancel or suspend their registrations as players.

On 11 March 2020, it was revealed that Okunbor had used Instagram to contact one of the women. In a leaked message obtained through Fox Sports, Okunbor said to the girl "Yeah had to have a good look, what are we doing tonight?".

On the same day, it was revealed that because of the two players' actions, new major sponsor Rashays had cancelled their $2 million sponsorship with the club. Rashays had signed on to become Canterbury's front of shirt sponsor. Rashays owner Rami Ykmour released a statement saying "It's a shame two players could wreck it for everyone, It's disgusting. It's repulsive, to be honest. That's something else. If they sack them, I would stand by the club and the NRL's decision".

On 1 April 2020, Okunbor had his contract terminated by Canterbury-Bankstown and was also deregistered by the NRL. Canterbury released a statement saying "The NRL have today deregistered both Jayden Okunbor and Corey Harawira-Naera with immediate effect and as a result their playing contracts with the Bulldogs have been cancelled, The conduct of the two players, on the eve of our final trial match, demonstrated an unacceptable lack of respect for their teammates, their coach and club officials, our hosts in Port Macquarie and fans of the game everywhere".

On 8 April 2020, both players opted to appeal their contract terminations at an NRL Appeals Tribunal (an independent hearing headed by high court judge Ian Callinan AC QC).

On 13 July 2020, the NRL Appeals Tribunal agreed (with the players appeal) that the punishment was too harsh, reversing the decision to deregister both Okunbor and Corey Harawira-Naera effective immediately. Okunbor was retrospectively given a 14-game ban (from the date of contract termination), a $22,500 fine and a course of counselling / community service. Corey Harawira-Neara received a retrospective 10 game ban (from the date of contract termination), and a $15,000 fine.
