= John Davies (rugby league, born 1991) =

English rugby league footballer

John "JD" Davies
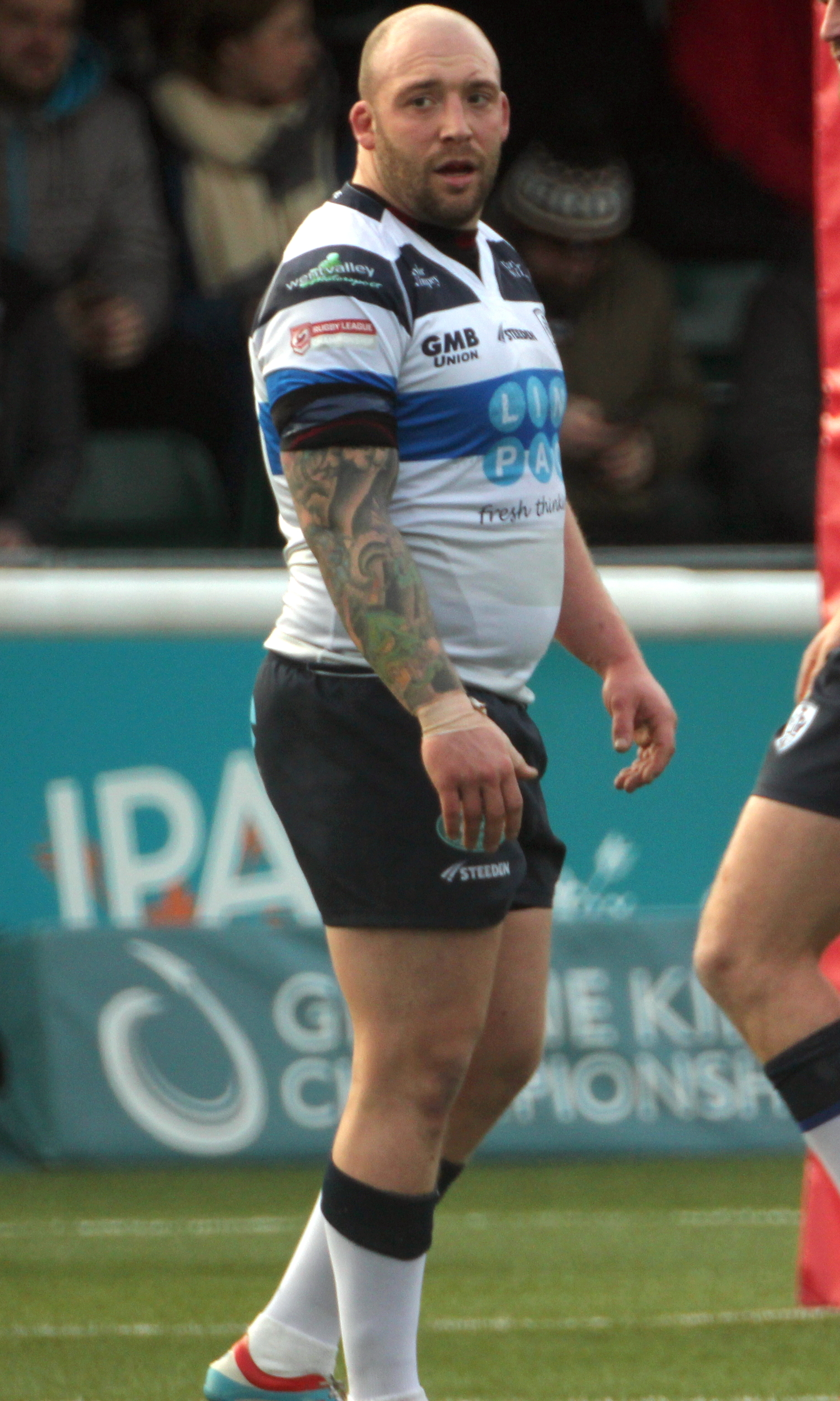

Personal information
- Full name: Jonathan Davies
- Born: 8 January 1991 (age 35) Castleford, West Yorkshire, England
- Height: 5 ft 9 in (1.75 m)
- Weight: 13 st 12 lb (88 kg)

Playing information
- Position: Second-row
Club
Years	Team	Pld	T	G	FG	P
2009–12	Castleford Tigers	7	1	0	0	4
2010(loan)	→ York City Knights	1	0	0	0	0
2011(loan)	→ York City Knights	7	6	0	0	24
2012(loan)	→ Dewsbury Rams	2	0	0	0	0
2012(loan)	→ York City Knights	13	4	0	0	16
2013–14	Batley Bulldogs	54	7	3	0	34
2015	Sheffield Eagles	27	3	0	0	12
2016–23	Featherstone Rovers	182	45	2	0	184
2024	Bradford Bulls	0	0	0	0	0
	Total	293	66	5	0	274
- Source: As of 15 January 2026

Jonathan "John" Davies (born 8 January 1991) is an English former professional rugby league footballer who last played for Featherstone Lions in the National Conference League.

== Background ==
Davies was born in Castleford, West Yorkshire, England.

== Career ==
Davies has previously played for amateur club Castleford Lock Lane, Super League team Castleford, and Championship side Batley. In his youth career, he represented England schools and the Yorkshire academy team.

=== Bradford Bulls ===
On 3 November 2023 it was reported that he would join Bradford for the 2024 season.

On 15 January 2026 it was reported that he had signed for NCL side Featherstone Lions
