= Jayden Myers =

English rugby league footballer (born 2003)

Personal information
- Full name: Jayden Myers
- Born: 13 April 2003 (age 23) Leeds, West Yorkshire, England
- Height: 6 ft 2 in (1.88 m)
- Weight: 14 st 13 lb (95 kg)

Playing information
- Position: Wing, Centre
Club
Years	Team	Pld	T	G	FG	P
2022–24	Bradford Bulls	39	18	0	0	72
2022(loan)	→ Cornwall	5	2	0	0	8
2025–	Wakefield Trinity	16	8	0	0	32
2025(loan)	→ Batley Bulldogs	8	3	0	0	12
	Total	68	31	0	0	124
- Source: As of 29 May 2026

Jayden Myers (born 13 April 2003) is a professional rugby league footballer who plays as a winger and centre for Wakefield Trinity in the Betfred Super League.

He has previously played for the Bradford Bulls in the RFL Championship and spent time on loan from Bradford at Cornwall in League 1. He has also spent time on loan from Wakefield at the Batley Bulldogs in the Betfred Championship.

== Background ==
Myers came through the Bradford Bulls Scholarship system and into the academy.

== Career ==
In April 2022 Myers made his debut for Cornwall, playing five games in League 1 on loan from Bradford.

He made his debut for the Bulls in a Challenge Cup victory over York Acorn in March 2023.

Wakefield Trinity paid an undisclosed fee to secure the signing of Myers from the Bradford Bulls in December 2024. He signed a three-year deal with the option of a fourth.

Myers made his Trinity debut in the Super League against the Salford Red Devils in May 2025.

He spent time in 2025 on loan at the Batley Bulldogs in the Betfred Championship.

Myers signed a five-year extension to his deal at Wakefield during the 2025 season, keeping at the DIY Kitchens Stadium until the end of the 2030 season.
