= Daniel Smith (rugby league) =

English rugby league footballer

Dan Smith
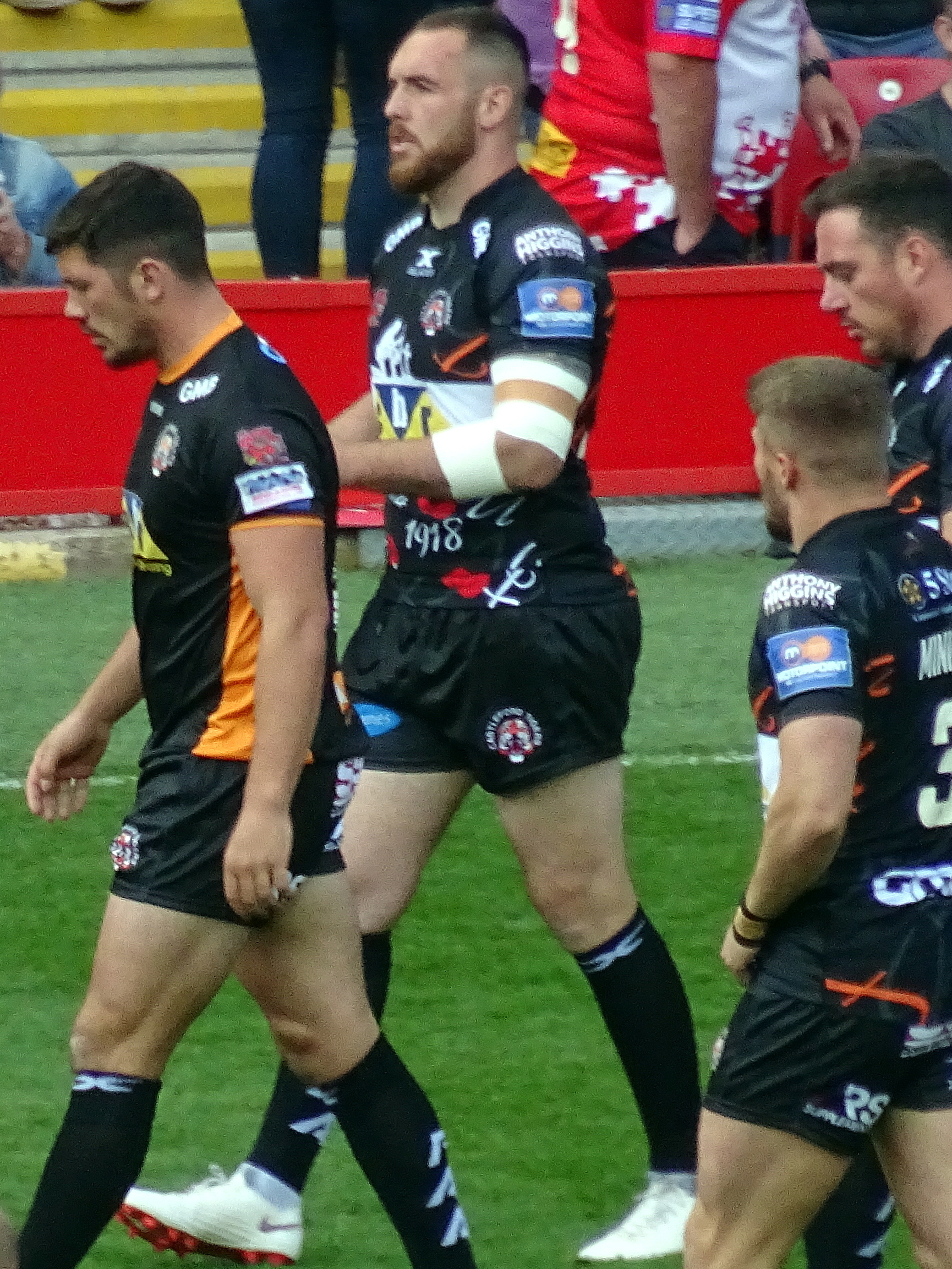

Personal information
- Full name: Daniel Smith
- Born: 20 March 1993 (age 33) Pontefract, West Yorkshire, England
- Height: 6 ft 2 in (1.88 m)
- Weight: 17 st 5 lb (110 kg)

Playing information
- Position: Prop, Loose forward
Club
| Years | Team | Pld | T | G | FG | P |
|---|---|---|---|---|---|---|
| 2012 | Leeds Rhinos | 0 | 0 | 0 | 0 | 0 |
| 2012(DR) | → Oldham | 4 | 0 | 0 | 0 | 0 |
| 2013 | South Sydney Rabbitohs | 0 | 0 | 0 | 0 | 0 |
| 2014–15 | Wakefield Trinity Wildcats | 38 | 6 | 0 | 0 | 24 |
| 2014(DR) | → Featherstone Rovers | 1 | 1 | 0 | 0 | 4 |
| 2015–19 | Huddersfield Giants | 50 | 5 | 0 | 0 | 20 |
| 2017(loan) | → Oldham | 3 | 1 | 0 | 0 | 4 |
| 2019(loan) | → Featherstone Rovers | 6 | 2 | 0 | 0 | 8 |
| 2019–23 | Castleford Tigers | 75 | 5 | 0 | 0 | 20 |
| 2023(DR) | → Halifax Panthers | 1 | 0 | 0 | 0 | 0 |
| 2023(loan) | → Featherstone Rovers | 2 | 0 | 0 | 0 | 0 |
| 2023 | Featherstone Rovers | 16 | 2 | 0 | 0 | 8 |
| 2024 | Bradford Bulls | 9 | 0 | 0 | 0 | 0 |
| | Total | 205 | 22 | 0 | 0 | 88 |
- Source: As of 26 March 2026
- Education: Castleford High School
- Relatives: Cameron Smith (brother)

Daniel Smith (born 20 March 1993) is a professional rugby league footballer who last played as a prop and loose forward for Bradford Bulls in the RFL Championship.

Smith is a Leeds Rhinos academy graduate. He previously played for Wakefield Trinity Wildcats, Huddersfield Giants and Castleford Tigers in the Super League, and South Sydney Rabbitohs in the NRL. He has spent time at Oldham, Featherstone Rovers and Halifax Panthers on dual registration from Leeds, Wakefield and Castleford respectively. He has also spent time at Oldham on loan from Huddersfield, and at Featherstone on loan from both Huddersfield and Castleford.

== Background ==
Smith was born in Pontefract, West Yorkshire, England. He is the brother of fellow rugby league footballer Cameron Smith. He attended Castleford High School.

Smith played at junior level for amateur side Castleford Lock Lane. In 2009, at the age of 15, he joined the academy at the Leeds Rhinos.

== Career ==
=== Leeds Rhinos ===
Smith was promoted to the senior Leeds squad prior to the 2012 season, and was allocated squad number 30. However, he did not make any first-team appearances for the Rhinos.

==== Oldham (dual registration) ====
In June 2012, Smith joined Championship 1 side Oldham on dual registration. He made four appearances for the Roughyeds.

=== South Sydney Rabbitohs ===
Smith moved to Australia in 2013 to play for South Sydney Rabbitohs under-20 side, where he made 24 appearances. At the end of his time down under, he recalled "Australia was the best experience of my life. It’s changed me massively on and off the field."

=== Wakefield Trinity Wildcats ===
Smith returned to England at the end of the year, signing a two-year contract with the Wakefield Trinity Wildcats in October 2013.

In 2014, he regularly appeared for Wakefield as a prop, and he scored 3 tries in 20 appearances. In July 2014, Smith signed a new three-year deal with Wakefield.

In 2015, he made a further 19 appearances and scored 4 tries, before leaving for Huddersfield in July as part of a deal that saw Anthony Mullally move the other way.

==== Featherstone Rovers (dual registration) ====
In 2014, Smith played one game for Featherstone Rovers on dual registration, scoring a try in his only appearance.

=== Huddersfield Giants ===
In July 2015, Smith was signed by Huddersfield Giants on a four-and-a-half-year deal.

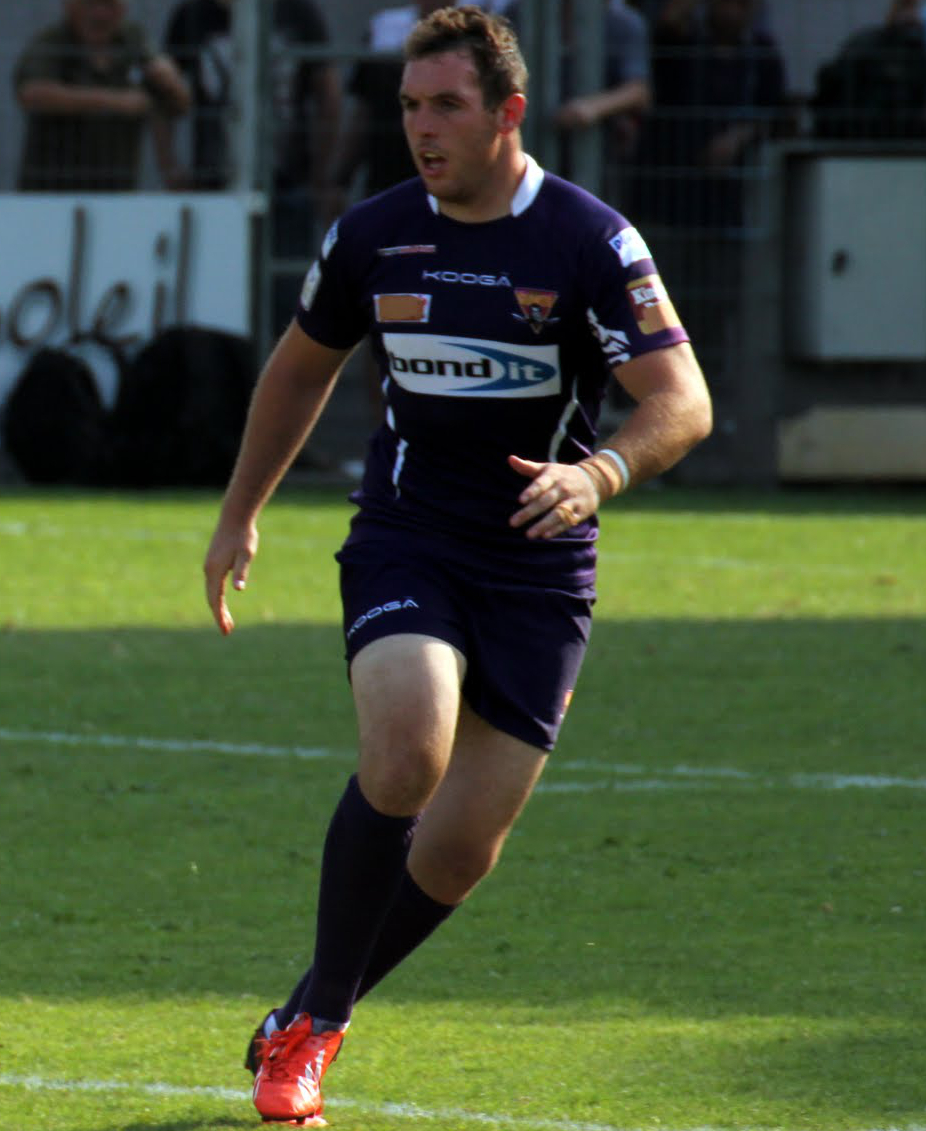
Smith playing for the Huddersfield Giants in Perpignan, France in 2015

He scored his first try for the Giants against his previous club Wakefield just weeks after completing his move away.

On 27 March 2019, Huddersfield announced that, as of 1 April, Smith would be released from the final year of his contract due to "him not featuring in [head coach] Simon [Woolford]'s plans". Across his time with Huddersfield, Smith made 50 appearances and scored 5 tries.

==== Oldham (loan) ====
Smith re-joined Oldham, this time playing in the Championship, on loan from Huddersfield in 2017. Across July, he made 3 appearances and scored 1 try.

==== Featherstone Rovers (loan) ====
Smith re-joined Featherstone Rovers on a one-month loan deal in January 2019. In his second stint at the club, he made 5 appearances and scored 2 tries.

=== Castleford Tigers ===
On 2 April 2019, Castleford Tigers announced the signing of Smith on a deal until the end of the 2020 season. He was assigned squad number 34. Castleford Director of Rugby Jon Wells said, "Daniel has been a target of ours for some time now and we are fortunate that the opportunity has arisen to bring him to the club earlier than we anticipated." Smith himself said of the signing: "I'm from here and I've always wanted to play for this club. I hope this is my last move."

Smith returned to the John Smith's Stadium on his first Tigers appearance, making his Castleford début against his previous club Huddersfield on 11 April 2019. He went on to appear 19 times for Castleford in 2019, scoring 1 try. Castleford Director of Rugby Jon Wells described him as a "hard-running, ball-playing, offloading" forward.

In 2020, Smith played in every game for Castleford until the season was suspended due to the COVID-19 pandemic. A pectoral injury disrupted his return upon Super League's resumption in August and limited him to 10 appearances that year. In December 2020, Smith agreed a contract extension for the 2021 season.

In May 2021, Smith signed a new deal with Castleford to stay with the club for a further two years. On 17 July 2021, he played for Castleford in their 2021 Challenge Cup Final loss against St. Helens. Throughout the 2021 season, Smith made 18 appearances and scored 3 tries. He was predominantly utilised as a prop but also covered loose forward and stand-off.

In May 2023, it was announced that Smith would depart Castleford with immediate effect after his loan move to Featherstone Rovers was made permanent. During his time with the Tigers, he made a total 75 appearances and scored 5 tries.

==== Halifax Panthers (dual registration) ====
In February 2023, Dan Smith played one game for Halifax Panthers on dual registration from Castleford.

==== Featherstone Rovers (loan) ====
Smith returned to Featherstone on a two-week loan from Castleford in May 2023, marking his third spell with the Rovers. He featured at loose forward in wins over Sheffield and Widnes.

=== Featherstone Rovers ===
Following an initial loan period, Smith joined Featherstone Rovers on a permanent deal in May 2023. Head coach Sean Long said, "He's skilful, smart and a hard worker. He's a perfect fit for our brand of rugby."

=== Bradford Bulls ===
On 31 October 2023 it was reported that he would join Bradford for the 2024 season on a two-year deal.

On 26 Nov 2024 it was reported that he had left Bradford Bulls by mutual consent due to external work commitments.
