= Connor Moore =

English rugby league footballer

Personal information
- Full name: Connor Moore
- Born: 8 July 2003 (age 22) Leeds, West Yorkshire, England
- Height: 6 ft 1 in (1.86 m)
- Weight: 15 st 8 lb (99 kg)

Playing information
- Position: Prop
Club
Years	Team	Pld	T	G	FG	P
2022–23	Hull Kingston Rovers	3	0	0	0	0
2022(loan)	→ Hunslet	4	0	0	0	0
2023(loan)	→ Newcastle Thunder	1	0	0	0	0
2023–	Saint-Gaudens Bears	1	0	0	0	0
	Total	9	0	0	0	0
- Source: As of 30 October 2023

Connor Moore (born 8 July 2003) is an English rugby league footballer who plays as a prop for the Saint-Gaudens Bears in the Elite One Championship.

== Playing career ==
=== Hull KR ===
In 2022 he made his Hull KR Super League début against the Wigan Warriors.

=== Saint-Gaudens Bears ===
On 18 September 2023 it was reported that he had joined French side Saint-Gaudens Bears
