= 2024 RFL 1895 Cup =

Rugby league competition in the United Kingdom

- Duration: Group stage + 3 knock-out rounds
- Number of teams: 21
- Highest attendance: 5,340, Bradford Bulls v Wakefield Trinity, 12 May 2024
- Lowest attendance: 180, Midlands Hurricanes v Doncaster, 28 January 2024

The 2024 RFL 1895 Cup (also known as the 2024 AB Sundecks 1895 Cup) was the fifth staging of the RFL 1895 Cup, a rugby league competition for English and Welsh clubs outside the Super League.

The competition was open to all clubs in the Championship and League 1 although French team, Toulouse Olympique have always declined to enter. League 1 club, Cornwall, also decided not to enter at the request of the other clubs to reduce the burden on the other clubs in having to travel to Cornwall.

For 2024 the format of the competition was significantly amended. In 2021 and 2022 the cup ran concurrently with the early rounds of the Challenge Cup with the teams reaching the knock-out stages being determined by progression in the Challenge Cup. To provide more games, especially for the League 1 teams, the competition for 2024 included a group stage; seven groups of three teams each, with the seven group winners and the second-placed team with the best record progressed to the quarter-finals. The groups were regionalised to reduce the financial costs further and League 1 clubs played at home in fixtures against Championship teams. Newcastle Thunder were included in the competition even though at that date the club's participation in the league for 2024 had yet to be confirmed.

The final was played at Wembley Stadium on 8 June 2024 alongside the finals of the Challenge Cup and the Women's Challenge Cup.

== Group stage ==
1895 Cup groups
| Group 1 | Group 2 | Group 3 | Group 4 | Group 5 | Group 6 | Group 7 |
|---|---|---|---|---|---|---|
| Barrow Raiders | Bradford Bulls | Newcastle Thunder | Halifax Panthers | Batley Bulldogs | North Wales Crusaders | Doncaster |
| Whitehaven | Dewsbury Rams | Wakefield Trinity | Oldham | Featherstone Rovers | Swinton Lions | Midlands Hurricanes |
| Workington Town | Keighley Cougars | York Knights | Rochdale Hornets | Hunslet | Widnes Vikings | Sheffield Eagles |

=== Results ===
1895 Cup, group stage week one
| Gp | Home | Score | Away | Match Information |
| Gp | Home | Score | Away | Date and Time | Venue | Referee | Attendance |
|---|---|---|---|---|---|---|---|
| 3 | Newcastle Thunder | 10–114 | York Knights | 27 January, 15:00 | Kingston Park | B. Milligan |
| 7 | Midlands Hurricanes | 4–40 | Doncaster | 28 January, 14:00 | Alexander Stadium | L. Bland | 180 |
| 6 | North Wales Crusaders | 12–40 | Swinton Lions | 28 January, 14:30 | Eirias Stadium | S. Mikalauskas | 520 |
| 1 | Workington Town | 8–30 | Barrow Raiders | 28 January, 15:00 | Derwent Park | A. Sweet | 901 |
| 2 | Keighley Cougars | 35–6 | Dewsbury Rams | 28 January, 15:00 | Cougar Park | K. Moore | 839 |
| 4 | Oldham | 24–20 | Halifax Panthers | 28 January, 15:00 | Boundary Park | M. Smaill | 1,521 |
| 5 | Hunslet | 12–62 | Featherstone Rovers | 28 January, 15:00 | South Leeds Stadium | R. Cox | 875 |

1895 Cup, group stage week two
| Gp | Home | Score | Away | Match Information |
| Gp | Home | Score | Away | Date and Time | Venue | Referee | Attendance |
|---|---|---|---|---|---|---|---|
| 5 | Batley Bulldogs | 15–14 | Featherstone Rovers | 4 February, 14:00 | Mount Pleasant | C. Worsley | 784 |
| 1 | Whitehaven | 12–18 | Barrow Raiders | 4 February, 15:00 | Recreation Ground | B. Milligan |
| 2 | Dewsbury Rams | 4–40 | Bradford Bulls | 4 February, 15:00 | Crown Flatt | A. Sweet | 1,009 |
| 3 | York Knights | 4–40 | Wakefield Trinity | 4 February, 15:00 | York Community Stadium | S. Mikalauskas | 2,817 |
| 4 | Rochdale Hornets | 12–52 | Halifax Panthers | 4 February, 15:00 | Spotland Stadium | R. Cox | 1,200 |
| 6 | Swinton Lions | 18–6 | Widnes Vikings | 4 February, 15:00 | Heywood Road | M. Smaill | 1,006 |
| 7 | Doncaster | 18–22 | Sheffield Eagles | 4 February, 15:00 | Keepmoat Stadium | K. Moore | 784 |

1895 Cup, group stage week three
| Gp | Home | Score | Away | Match Information |
| Gp | Home | Score | Away | Date and Time | Venue | Referee | Attendance |
|---|---|---|---|---|---|---|---|
| 6 | North Wales Crusaders | 14–30 | Widnes Vikings | 18 February, 14:30 | Eirias Stadium | M. Lynn | 1,088 |
| 1 | Workington Town | 22–28 | Whitehaven | 18 February, 15:00 | Derwent Park | R. Cox | 1,476 |
| 2 | Keighley Cougars | 18–26 | Bradford Bulls | 18 February, 15:00 | Cougar Park | C. Worsley | 3,729 |
| 3 | Newcastle Thunder | 0–110 | Wakefield Trinity | 18 February, 15:00 | Post Office Road, Featherstone (Note: Match switched to Featherstone as Kingston Park was unavailable to Newcastle Thunder.) | L. O'Brien | 1,378 |
| 4 | Oldham | 38–12 | Rochdale Hornets | 18 February, 15:00 | Boundary Park | K. Moore | 1,684 |
| 5 | Hunslet | 0–36 | Batley Bulldogs | 18 February, 15:00 | South Leeds Stadium | S. Mikalauskas | 700 |
| 7 | Midlands Hurricanes | 16–30 | Sheffield Eagles | 18 February, 15:00 | Alexander Stadium | M. Smaill | 345 |

=== Standings ===
Group 1
| Pos | Team | Pld | W | D | L | PF | PA | PD | Pts | Qualification |
|---|---|---|---|---|---|---|---|---|---|---|
| 1 | Barrow Raiders | 2 | 2 | 0 | 0 | 48 | 20 | +28 | 4 | Advance to knock-out stages |
| 2 | Whitehaven | 2 | 1 | 0 | 1 | 40 | 40 | 0 | 2 | |
| 3 | Workington Town | 2 | 0 | 0 | 2 | 30 | 58 | −28 | 0 | |

Group 2
| Pos | Team | Pld | W | D | L | PF | PA | PD | Pts | Qualification |
|---|---|---|---|---|---|---|---|---|---|---|
| 1 | Bradford Bulls | 2 | 2 | 0 | 0 | 66 | 22 | +44 | 4 | Advance to knock-out stages |
| 2 | Keighley Cougars | 2 | 1 | 0 | 1 | 53 | 32 | +21 | 2 | |
| 3 | Dewsbury Rams | 2 | 0 | 0 | 2 | 10 | 75 | −65 | 0 | |

Group 3
| Pos | Team | Pld | W | D | L | PF | PA | PD | Pts | Qualification |
|---|---|---|---|---|---|---|---|---|---|---|
| 1 | Wakefield Trinity | 2 | 2 | 0 | 0 | 150 | 4 | +146 | 4 | Advance to knock-out stages |
| 2 | York Knights | 2 | 1 | 0 | 1 | 118 | 50 | +68 | 2 | Advance as best 2nd-place team |
| 3 | Newcastle Thunder | 2 | 0 | 0 | 2 | 10 | 224 | −214 | 0 | |

Group 4
| Pos | Team | Pld | W | D | L | PF | PA | PD | Pts | Qualification |
|---|---|---|---|---|---|---|---|---|---|---|
| 1 | Oldham | 2 | 2 | 0 | 0 | 62 | 32 | +30 | 4 | Advance to knock-out stages |
| 2 | Halifax Panthers | 2 | 1 | 0 | 1 | 72 | 36 | +36 | 2 | |
| 3 | Rochdale Hornets | 2 | 0 | 0 | 2 | 24 | 90 | −66 | 0 | |

Group 5
| Pos | Team | Pld | W | D | L | PF | PA | PD | Pts | Qualification |
|---|---|---|---|---|---|---|---|---|---|---|
| 1 | Batley Bulldogs | 2 | 2 | 0 | 0 | 51 | 14 | +37 | 4 | Advance to knock-out stages |
| 2 | Featherstone Rovers | 2 | 1 | 0 | 1 | 76 | 27 | +49 | 2 | |
| 3 | Hunslet | 2 | 0 | 0 | 2 | 12 | 98 | −86 | 0 | |

Group 6
| Pos | Team | Pld | W | D | L | PF | PA | PD | Pts | Qualification |
|---|---|---|---|---|---|---|---|---|---|---|
| 1 | Swinton Lions | 2 | 2 | 0 | 0 | 58 | 18 | +40 | 4 | Advance to knock-out stages |
| 2 | Widnes Vikings | 2 | 1 | 0 | 1 | 36 | 32 | +4 | 2 | |
| 3 | North Wales Crusaders | 2 | 0 | 0 | 2 | 26 | 70 | −44 | 0 | |

Group 7
| Pos | Team | Pld | W | D | L | PF | PA | PD | Pts | Qualification |
|---|---|---|---|---|---|---|---|---|---|---|
| 1 | Sheffield Eagles | 2 | 2 | 0 | 0 | 52 | 34 | +18 | 4 | Advance to knock-out stages |
| 2 | Doncaster | 2 | 1 | 0 | 1 | 58 | 26 | +32 | 2 | |
| 3 | Midlands Hurricanes | 2 | 0 | 0 | 2 | 20 | 70 | −50 | 0 | |

== Quarter-finals ==
The draws for the quarter-finals and semi-finals were made on 18 February. The seven group winners were joined in the draw by York Knights as the best second-placed team. The quarter-finals were played on 3 March.

1895 Cup, Quarter-finals
| Home | Score | Away | Match Information |
| Home | Score | Away | Date and Time | Venue | Referee | Attendance |
|---|---|---|---|---|---|---|
| Wakefield Trinity | 30–12 | Barrow Raiders | 2 March, 15:00 | Belle Vue | L. Rush | 1,809 |
| Bradford Bulls | 21–12 | Swinton Lions | 3 March, 15:00 | Odsal Stadium | S. Mikalauskas | 1,018 |
| Sheffield Eagles | 26–10 | Batley Bulldogs | 3 March, 15:00 | Sheffield Olympic Legacy Stadium | M. Griffiths | 732 |
| York Knights | 46–12 | Oldham | 3 March, 15:00 | York Community Stadium | B. Thaler | 1,048 |

== Semi-finals ==
The semi-finals were played on 12 May.

1895 Cup, Semi-finals
| Home | Score | Away | Match Information |
| Home | Score | Away | Date and Time | Venue | Referee | Attendance |
|---|---|---|---|---|---|---|
| Bradford Bulls | 14–40 | Wakefield Trinity | 12 May | Odsal Stadium | L. Rush | 5,340 |
| York Knights | 18–28 | Sheffield Eagles | 12 May | York Community Stadium | S. Mikalauskas | 1,309 |

== Final ==
The final was played on 8 June.

8 June 2024
17:45 BST

| Wakefield Trinity | 50–6 | Sheffield Eagles |
|---|---|---|
| Tries: Walmsley, Gale, Doyle, Pratt (2), Griffin (2), McGillvary (2); Goals: Jowitt (7/9) | Report | Tries: Thackeray; Goals: Aston |

Wembley Stadium, London
Referee: T. Grant
Touch judges: M. Craven, 2: W. Turley
Ray French Award: Luke Gale (Wakefield Trinity)

Team details
| Wakefield Trinity | | Position | Sheffield Eagles |
| Name | Number | Position | Number | Name |
|---|---|---|---|---|
| Max Jowitt | 1 | Fullback | 14 | Jack Hansen |
| Jermaine McGillvary | 2 | Wing | 2 | Ben Jones-Bishop |
| Iain Thornley | 4 | Centre | 3 | Kris Welham |
| Oliver Pratt | 3 | Centre | 4 | James Glover |
| Lachlan Walmsley | 5 | Wing | 5 | Matty Dawson-Jones |
| Luke Gale | 6 | Stand off | 6 | Cory Aston |
| Mason Lino | 7 | Scrum half | 7 | Anthony Thackeray |
| Josh Bowden | 8 | Prop forward | 8 | Eddie Battye |
| Liam Hood | 9 | Hooker | 9 | Vila Halafihi |
| Renouf Atoni | 10 | Prop forward | 10 | Tyler Dickinson |
| Matty Ashurst | 11 | Second row | 11 | Connor Bower |
| Josh Griffin | 12 | Second row | 12 | Joel Farrell |
| Jay Pitts | 13 | Loose forward | 13 | Titus Gwaze |
| Liam Kay | 14 | Interchange | 17 | Mitch Clark |
| Caleb Uele | 15 | Interchange | 18 | Aaron Murphy |
| Ky Rodwell | 18 | Interchange | 22 | Kyle Wood |
| Thomas Doyle | 21 | Interchange | 27 | Jesse Sene-Lefao |
| Luke Bain | 1 | Reserve | 18 | Evan Hodgson |
| Daryl Powell | | Coach | | Mark Aston |
