= Zach Fishwick =

English rugby league footballer (born 2005)

Personal information
- Full name: Zachary Fishwick
- Born: 9 March 2005 (age 21) Kingston upon Hull, England
- Height: 6 ft 0 in (1.83 m)
- Weight: 15 st 6 lb (98 kg)

Playing information
- Position: Prop
Club
Years	Team	Pld	T	G	FG	P
2022–26	Hull Kingston Rovers	9	1	0	0	4
2024(DR)	→ Featherstone Rovers	8	0	0	0	0
2024(loan)	→ Bradford Bulls	2	0	0	0	0
2025(DR)	→ Hunslet	3	0	0	0	0
2026(loan)	→ Halifax Panthers	4	0	0	0	0
2026(loan)	→ Batley Bulldogs	2	0	0	0	0
2027–	York Knights	0	0	0	0	0
	Total	28	1	0	0	4
- Source: As of 15 October 2026

Zach Fishwick (born 9 March 2005) is a professional rugby league footballer who plays as a prop for York Knights in the Super League.

== Playing career ==
=== Hull KR ===
In 2022 Fishwick made his Hull KR début in the Super League against Hull FC

He was amongst 10 other players who left Hull KR at the end of the 2026 season

=== Featherstone Rovers (DR loan) ===
On 8 March 2024 it was reported that he had signed for Featherstone Rovers in the RFL Championship on DR loan from Hull KR.

=== Hunslet RLFC (loan) ===
On 12 February 2025 it was reported that he had signed for Hunslet RLFC in the RFL Championship on short-term 2-week loan from Hull KR.

=== Halifax Panthers (loan) ===
On 30 April 2026 it was reported that he had signed for Halifax Panthers in the RFL Championship on 2-week loan

=== Batley Bulldogs (loan) ===
On 22 July 2026 it was reported that he had signed for Batley Bulldogs in the RFL Championship on an initial one-week loan

=== York Knights ===
On 14 October 2026 it was reported that he had signed for York Knights in the Super League on a 1-year deal.
