= 2026 Bradford Bulls season =

English rugby league team season

Bradford Bulls 2026 season
- 2026 Super League season Rank: 14th
- Play-off result: Did not qualify
- Challenge Cup: Round 4
- 2026 record: Wins: 8; draws: 0; losses: 21
- Points scored: For: 468; against: 852

Team information
- CEO: Jason Hirst
- Head Coach: Kurt Haggerty
- Captain: Joe Mellor
- Stadium: Odsal Stadium
- Agg. attendance: 8,568
- High attendance: 14,491; Leeds Rhinos, 3 April
- Low attendance: 6,786; Castleford Tigers, 3 September

Top scorers
- Tries: Ethan Ryan (15)
- Goals: Luke Hooley (28)
- Points: Luke Hooley (64)
Home colours	Away colours	Third colours
← 2025	List of seasons	2027 →

The 2026 season was the Bradford Bulls' first season playing in England's top division of rugby league for the first time in four years, following their ascension to the league through the IMG Grading system. They competed in the 2026 Super League season and the 2026 Challenge Cup.

== Preseason friendlies ==
Date and time	Versus	H/A	Venue	Result	Score	Tries	Goals	Attendance	Report
10 January; 15:00	Dewsbury Rams	A	Crown Flatt	N/A	C–C (Note: Cancelled due to a frozen pitch.)				
11 January; 15:00	Doncaster R.L.F.C.	A	Eco-Power Stadium	W	30–12	Marsters, Nikorima, Blake, Fulton, Hooley, Gill	Okunbor (1/1), Milnes (1/4), Hooley (1/1)		
24 January; 15:00 (Note: Cameron Smith testimonial match.)	Leeds Rhinos	A	Headingley Rugby Stadium	L	16–46	Keyes, Ryan (2)	Hooley (2/3)		

== Super League ==
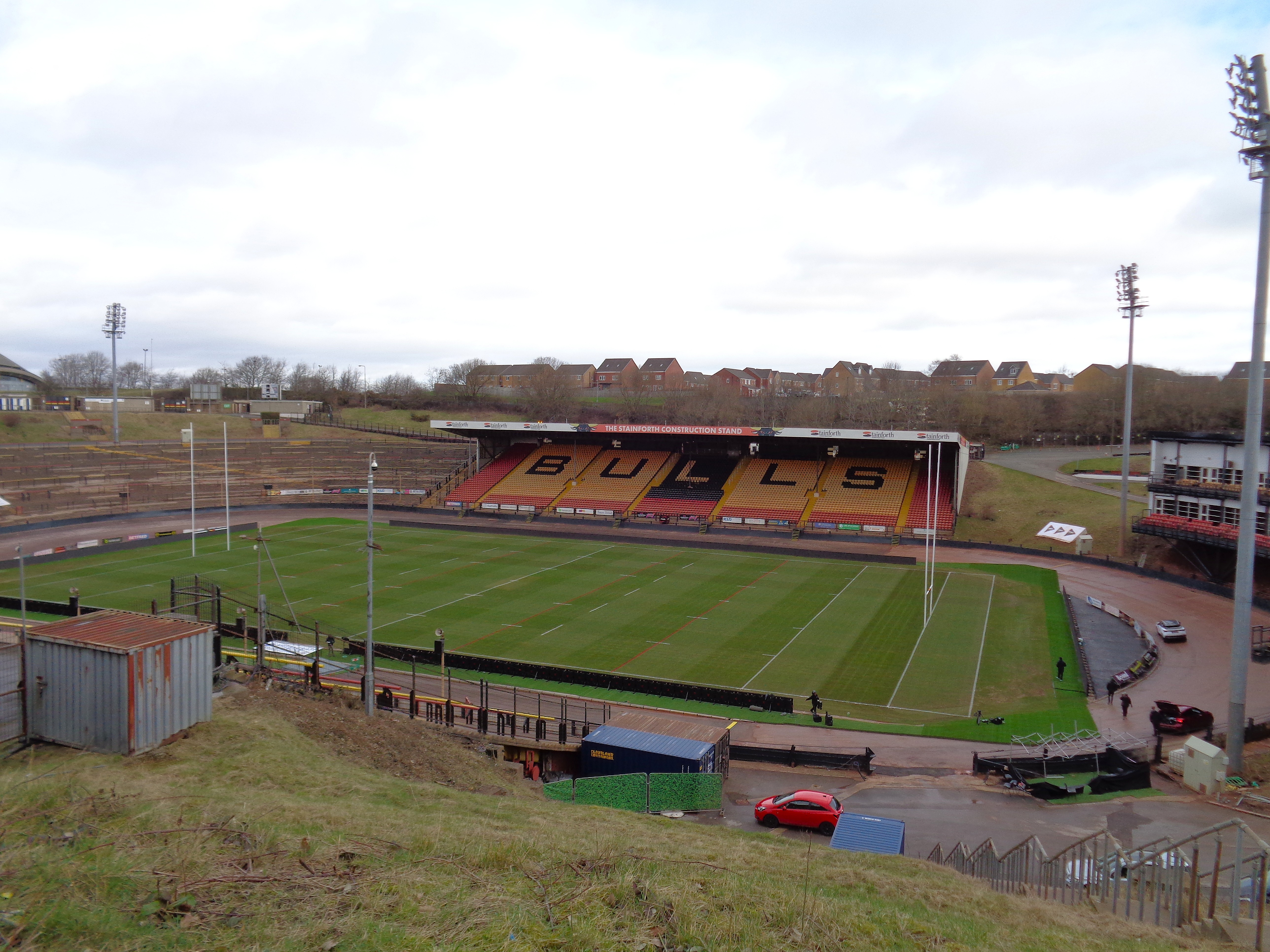
Odsal Stadium, pictured in March 2026, received a number of upgrades prior to the start of the 2026 season

From 2026, the Super League expanded to 14 teams, with Toulouse Olympique and York Knights being promoted from the RFL Championship via the IMG Grading system. As a result of Salford Red Devils being relegated, however, Bradford returned to the Super League for the first time since 2016. This marked Bradford's return to the Super League for the first time since the 2016 season.

The condition of Bradford's home Odsal Stadium proved initially controversial, with Leigh Leopards coach Adrian Lam calling the pitch a "shitbox" and stating he was "not looking forward to going there, but I'm looking forward to [the Bulls] being part of the competition". Ahead of the start of the season, stock car racing was discontinued at Odsal as part of a series of ground improvements to bring the stadium back up to Super League standards, which included the installation of new floodlights and LED advertising boards, a repainting of the South Bank hospitality suites, a new big screen replacing one that had been damaged by high winds a year prior, and astroturfing around the edges of the 88 m × 55 m (289 ft × 180 ft) pitch, the smallest pitch in the Super League permitted by RFL regulations.

=== Fixtures ===
Bradford Bulls' Super League 2026 fixtures were released on 27 November 2025:

Date and time	Round	Versus	H/A	Venue	Result	Score	Tries	Goals	Attendance	TV	Pos.	Report
14 February; 17:30	Round 1	Hull F.C.	A	MKM Stadium	L	20–27	Wynne (2), Blake	Milnes (2/3 + 2 pen.)	16,653	Sky Sports +	10th	
20 February; 20:00	Round 2	Catalans Dragons	H	Odsal Stadium	W	28–10	Blake (2), Ackers, Aekins	Milnes (3/4 + 3 pen.)	9,992	Sky Sports Action	4th	
1 March; 15:00	Round 3	Toulouse Olympique	H	Odsal Stadium	W	18–6	Ryan (3), Blake	Milnes (1/4)	8,777	Sky Sports +	4th	
7 March; 17:30	Round 4	St Helens	A	BrewDog Stadium	L	22–26	Wynne (2), Ryan, Ackers	Hooley (2/4 + 1 pen.)	12,031	Sky Sports +	5th	
20 March; 20:00	Round 5	Huddersfield Giants	H	Odsal Stadium	W	26–14	Nikorima (2), Ruan, Hooley	Atkin (2/2), Hooley (1/2 + 2 pen.)	10,031	Sky Sports +	5th	
26 March; 20:00	Round 6	Castleford Tigers	A	Wheldon Road	L	28–40	Marsters, Mellor, Hooley	Hooley (4/4 + 2 pen.)	7,095	Sky Sports + Main	6th	
3 April; 20:00 (Good Friday)	Round 7 (Rivals Round)	Leeds Rhinos	H	Odsal Stadium	L	12–24	Blake, Wynne, Mellor	Milnes (0/3)	14,491	BBC iPlayer; Sky Sports +	8th	
18 April; 20:00	Round 8	Wakefield Trinity	A	Belle Vue	L	12–52	Fulton, Peposhi	Atkin (2/2)	8,608	Sky Sports +	8th	
25 April; 15:00	Round 9	Hull KR	H	Odsal Stadium	L	12–48	Douglas, Eden	Atkin (2/2)	7,751	Sky Sports +	11th	
2 May; 15:00	Round 10	Wigan Warriors	A	Brick Community Stadium	L	14–38	Ryan (2), Fulton	Atkin (1/3)	13,362	BBC iPlayer; Sky Sports +	11th	
17 May; 15:00	Round 11	Hull F.C.	H	Odsal Stadium	W	16–14	Blake, Ryan	Atkin (1/2 + 3 pen.)	7,815	Sky Sports +	10th	
24 May; 15:00	Round 12	Warrington Wolves	A	Halliwell Jones Stadium	L	12–26	Gill, Nikorima	Atkin (1/1), Hooley (1/1)	9,306	Sky Sports +	11th	
5 June; 20:00	Round 13	York Knights	H	Odsal Stadium	W	30–20	Nikorima, Mellor, Dean, Doro	Dean (4/4 + 3 pen.)	7,066	Sky Sports +	9th	
14 June; 15:00	Round 14	Leigh Leopards	H	Odsal Stadium	L	12–38	Atkin, Aekins	Dean (2/2)	8,010	Sky Sports +	10th	
20 June; 18:00 (BST)	Round 15	Catalans Dragons	A	Stade Gilbert Brutus	L	24–34	Wynne (2), Sutton, Ryan, Aekins	Atkin (1/3), Dean (1/2)	8,122	Sky Sports +	11th	
27 June; 20:00	Round 16	St Helens	H	Odsal Stadium	L	10–40	Steinwede	Hooley (1/1 + 1 pen.), Atkin (1 pen.)	7,019	Sky Sports +	11th	
5 July; 15:00	Round 17 (Magic Weekend)	Leeds Rhinos	N	Hill Dickinson Stadium	L	16–50	Ryan (2), Aekins	Hooley (2/3)	42,903	Sky Sports + Main	13th	
10 July; 20:00	Round 18	Huddersfield Giants	A	Kirklees Stadium	W	30–14	Blake (2), Sutton, Nikorima	Atkin (4/4 + 3 pen.)	3,969	Sky Sports +	11th	
16 July; 20:00	Round 19	Wakefield Trinity	H	Odsal Stadium	L	12–26	Ryan, Atkin	Hooley (1/2 + 1 pen.)	7,518	Sky Sports +	12th	
26 July; 15:00	Round 20 (Rivals Round Reversed)	Leeds Rhinos	A	Headingley Rugby Stadium	L	12–42	Armitage, Ryan	Hooley (2/2)	16,548	BBC Two; Sky Sports +	12th	
31 July; 20:00	Round 21	Hull KR	A	Craven Park	L	16–40	Armitage, Wynne, Ackers	Hooley (2/3)	12,126	Sky Sports +	12th	
8 August; 18:30	Round 22	Warrington Wolves	H	Odsal Stadium	L	4–42	Ryan	Hooley (0/1)		Sky Sports +	13th	
15 August; 18:30	Round 23	Wigan Warriors	H	Odsal Stadium	L	6–34	Ackers	Hooley (1/1)	7,561	Sky Sports +	14th	
21 August; 20:00	Round 24	Leigh Leopards	A	Leigh Sports Village	L	10–62	Blake, Peposhi	Atkin (1/2)	8,045	Sky Sports +	14th	
29 August; 20:00 (BST)	Round 25	Toulouse Olympique	A	Stade Ernest Wallon	L	18–28	Atkin, Ackers, Leake	Hooley (1/1), Atkin (2/2)	3,743	Sky Sports +	14th	
3 September; 20:00	Round 26	Castleford Tigers	H	Odsal Stadium	W	32–22	Dean, Wynne, Aekins, Russell, Blake, Scurr	Atkin (4/5)	6,786	Sky Sports +	14th	
10 September; 20:00 (Note: Fixture moved from 11 September at 20:00 due to selection for live broadcasting.)	Round 27	York Knights	A	York Community Stadium	L	12–35	Sutton, Dean, Okunbor	Atkin (2/3)	5,136	Sky Sports +	14th	

=== Table ===
Pos	Team	Pld	W	D	L	PF	PA	PD	Pts	Qualification
1	Wigan Warriors (L, E)	27	22	0	5	851	439	+412	44	Advance to Semi-finals
2	Leeds Rhinos (E)	27	20	0	7	904	426	+478	40	Advance to Semi-finals
3	Warrington Wolves (F)	27	20	0	7	726	465	+261	40	Advance to Eliminators
4	Wakefield Trinity (F)	27	19	0	8	709	486	+223	38	Advance to Eliminators
5	Leigh Leopards (E)	27	17	0	10	644	497	+147	34	Advance to Eliminators
6	Hull KR (E)	27	16	0	11	748	503	+245	32	Advance to Eliminators
7	St Helens	27	15	0	12	636	614	+22	30	
8	Toulouse Olympique	27	10	0	17	578	704	−126	20	
9	Catalans Dragons	27	10	0	17	537	802	−265	20	
10	York Knights	27	9	0	18	545	791	−246	18	
11	Hull F.C.	27	8	0	19	488	597	−109	16	
12	Huddersfield Giants	27	8	0	19	509	765	−256	16	
13	Castleford Tigers	27	8	0	19	464	866	−402	16	
14	Bradford Bulls	27	7	0	20	468	852	−384	14	

Updated to match(es) played on 12 September 2026. Source:
(E) Eliminated; (F) Grand Finalists; (L) League Leaders' Shield Winners

== Challenge Cup ==
The Bradford Bulls were first drawn on 12 January to play the London Broncos, following London's 86-0 defeat of the Wests Warriors in their Round 2 fixture on 25 January. Following their victory against London, the Bradford Bulls were ultimately knocked out of the 2026 Challenge Cup after being beaten 30-6 away by eventual cup final winners Wigan Warriors.

Date and time	Round	Versus	H/A	Venue	Result	Score	Tries	Goals	Attendance	TV	Report
7 February; 18:00	Round 3	London Broncos	A	Plough Lane	W	26–8	Okunbor, Ackers, Ryan, Russell, Blake	Milnes (3/5)	3,477	BBC iPlayer	
14 March; 12:00	Round 4	Wigan Warriors	A	Brick Community Stadium	L	6–30	Ryan	Hooley	9,997	Not televised	

== Transfers ==
=== Gains ===
Player	Club	Contract	Date
(England) Luke Hooley	Castleford Tigers	2 years	September 2025
(England) Andy Ackers	Leeds Rhinos	2 years	October 2025
(England) Rowan Milnes	Castleford Tigers	2 years	October 2025
(Nigeria) Eribe Doro	Hull Kingston Rovers	2 years	October 2025
(Ireland) Ethan Ryan	Oldham	3 years	October 2025
(New Zealand) Jayden Nikorima	Salford Red Devils	3 years	October 2025
(Australia) Loghan Lewis	Salford Red Devils	2 years	October 2025
(England) Will Gardiner	Hull F.C.	2 years	October 2025
(England) Brandon Douglas	Halifax Panthers	2 years	October 2025
(England) Connor Wynne	Featherstone Rovers	1 year	November 2025
(Wales) Caleb Aekins	Featherstone Rovers	1 year	November 2025
(Papua New Guinea) Daniel Russell	Warrington Wolves	1 year	November 2025
(England) Ryan Sutton	Canterbury-Bankstown Bulldogs	1 year	November 2025
(England) Joe Mellor	Salford Red Devils	1 year	November 2025
(Cook Islands) Esan Marsters	Salford Red Devils	3 years	December 2025
(England) Chris Atkin	Castleford Tigers	1 year	March 2026
(Australia) Phoenix Steinwede	Tweed Heads Seagulls	End of season	March 2026
(Ireland) Riley Dean	Oldham R.L.F.C.	End of season	May 2026

==== Loans in ====
Player	Club	Loan period	Date
(Ireland) Ed Chamberlain	Hull F.C.	End of season	November 2025
(England) Leon Ruan	Hull Kingston Rovers	End of season	December 2025
(England) Jack Ormondroyd	Oldham R.L.F.C.	End of season	March 2026
(England) Greg Eden	North Wales Crusaders	One month	April 2026

=== Losses ===
Player	Club	Contract	Date
(England) Chris Hill	N/A	Retirement	September 2025
(Jamaica) Michael Lawrence	N/A	Retirement	September 2025
(England) Kieran Gill	Sheffield Eagles	2 years	October 2025
(England) Jordan Lilley	Sheffield Eagles	2 years	October 2025
(Scotland) Bayley Liu	Halifax Panthers	1 year	October 2025
(England) Matty Gee	N/A	Retirement	October 2025
(England) Tom Holmes	Doncaster R.L.F.C.	2 years	November 2025
(Papua New Guinea) Emmanuel Waine	Oldham R.L.F.C.	1 year	November 2025
(England) Jimmy Meadows	London Broncos	1 year	December 2025
(Scotland) Logan Bayliss-Brow	Gold Coast Titans	1 year	December 2025
(England) Nathan Mason	N/A		December 2025
(England) James Donaldson	N/A	Retirement	December 2025
(Australia) Tyran Ott	Ipswich Jets	1 year	January 2026
(Samoa) Zane Musgrove	Western Clydesdales		April 2026
(Ireland) Ronan Michael	Innisfail Leprechauns		April 2026

==== Loans out ====
Player	Club	Loan period	Date
(England) Jacob Bateman	Dewsbury Rams	End of season	November 2025
(Ireland) Jamie Gill	Dewsbury Rams	End of season	February 2026
(England) Cameron Bate	Swinton Lions	End of season	February 2026
(England) Brandon Douglas	Halifax Panthers	1 month	April 2026

== Squad ==
2026 Bradford Bulls squad
First team squad			Coaching staff
1 (Wales) Caleb Aekins – FB, SO; 2 (Australia) Jayden Okunbor – WG, CE (gk); 3 (Cook Islands) Esan Marsters – CE, SO, FB; 4 (Fiji) Waqa Blake – CE, WG; 5 (Ireland) Ethan Ryan – WG, FB, CE; 6 (New Zealand) Jayden Nikorima (vc) – SO, SH; 7 (England) Rowan Milnes – SH, SO (gk); 8 (England) Ryan Sutton (vc) – PR, LF; 9 (England) Andy Ackers – HK; 10 (Australia) Loghan Lewis – PR; 11 (Papua New Guinea) Dan Russell – SR, LF, CE; 12 (Australia) Zac Fulton – SR, LF; 13 (England) Joe Mellor (c) – LF, HK, SO	14 (Australia) Mitch Souter – HK; 15 (England) Eribe Doro – PR; 16 (England) Ebon Scurr – PR; 18 (Ireland) Joe Keyes – SH, SO; 19 (England) Will Gardiner – LF, PR; 20 (England) Brandon Douglas – PR, SR; 21 (England) Sam Hallas – LF, HK; 22 (England) Luke Hooley – FB (gk); 23 (England) Connor Wynne – CE, FB, WG; 24 (England) Guy Armitage – WG, CE; 25 (Albania) Eliot Peposhi – SR, LF	27 (England) Alfie Leake – PR; 28 (Ireland) Jamie Gill – PR; 29 (England) Cameron Bate – LF; 30 (England) Leon Ruan – SR; 32 (England) Chris Atkin – SH, HK, SO (gk); 33 (England) Jack Ormondroyd – PR; 34 (Australia) Phoenix Steinwede – SR; 36 (England) Harvey Ward – CE; 38 (Ireland) Riley Dean – SO, SH (gk)	Head coach: (Ireland) Kurt Haggerty; Assistant coaches: (England) Carl Forster; (England) Lee Greenwood; Legend: (c) Captain(s); (vc) Vice-captain(s); (red card) = suspended; = injured; (gk) = Goal kicker; Updated: 11 September 2026; Source(s): First Team
