= 2022 Salford Red Devils season =

Salford Red Devils season

- Super League Rank: 6
- Play-off result: Semi-finals
- Challenge Cup: Sixth round
- 2022 record: Wins: 14; draws: 0; losses: 14
- Points scored: For: 700; against: 622

Team information
- Chairman: Ian Blease
- Head Coach: Paul Rowley
- Captain: Elijah Taylor
- Stadium: AJ Bell Stadium; Barton-upon-Irwell, Greater Manchester
- Avg. attendance: 4,690
- Agg. attendance: 58,888
- High attendance: 6,041
- Low attendance: 3,221

Top scorers
- Tries: Ken Sio (28)
- Goals: Marc Sneyd (105)
- Points: Marc Sneyd (228)
← 2021	List of seasons	2023 →

In the 2022 rugby league season, Salford Red Devils competed in Super League XXVII and the 2022 Challenge Cup. Salford played at the AJ Bell Stadium and were coached by Paul Rowley.

== Season review ==
On 11 February, Salford began their Super League campaign with a 26–16 away win at Castleford Tigers, which they followed with a 38–12 win over Toulouse Olympique. After this Salford began a poor run of results which saw them knocked out in the sixth round of the Challenge Cup and fall to tenth in the table by early May. However, their season then began to improve with back-to-back wins against Leeds Rhinos and Castleford and although a win over Wakefield Trinity in June was seen as boosting their chances of survival, by mid-July their win over Catalans Dragons was described in terms of them possibly reaching the play-offs. A 44–12 upset of league leaders' St Helens was part of a strong late season that also included wins over Huddersfield Giants and Castleford and meant that Salford went into the final round of the regular season having already qualified for the play-offs and so named six debutants in the squad for their 32–14 loss to the Warrington Wolves.

After finishing sixth in the table, Salford faced third-placed Huddersfield in the play-offs and defeated them 28–0 to set up a semi-final fixture with St Helens. On 17 September, their season was ended at the Totally Wicked Stadium by a 19–12 loss to the defending champions. At the 2022 Super League Awards on 20 September, Brodie Croft was named the Man of Steel.

== Results ==
=== Pre-season friendlies ===
W Win L Loss

Pre-season results
Date	Versus	H/A	Venue	Result	Score	Tries	Goals	Attendance	Report
15 January	Swinton Lions	H	AJ Bell Stadium	W	48–12				
21 January	Halifax Panthers	H	AJ Bell Stadium	W	32–10				(Note: Colin Dixon memorial trophy)
4 February	Warrington Wolves	A	Halliwell Jones Stadium	L	14–30				(Note: Lee Mossop testimonial)

=== Super League ===
==== Table ====
Pos	Team	Pld	W	D	L	PF	PA	PD	Pts	Qualification
1	St Helens (C, L)	27	21	0	6	674	374	+300	42	Advance to semi-finals
2	Wigan Warriors	27	19	0	8	818	483	+335	38	Advance to semi-finals
3	Huddersfield Giants	27	17	1	9	613	497	+116	35	Advance to elimination finals
4	Catalans Dragons	27	16	0	11	539	513	+26	32	Advance to elimination finals
5	Leeds Rhinos	27	14	1	12	577	528	+49	29	Advance to elimination finals
6	Salford Red Devils	27	14	0	13	700	602	+98	28	Advance to elimination finals
7	Castleford Tigers	27	13	0	14	544	620	−76	26	
8	Hull Kingston Rovers	27	12	0	15	498	608	−110	24	
9	Hull FC	27	11	0	16	508	675	−167	22	
10	Wakefield Trinity	27	10	0	17	497	648	−151	20	
11	Warrington Wolves	27	9	0	18	568	664	−96	18	
12	Toulouse Olympique (R)	27	5	0	22	421	745	−324	10	Relegated to the Championship

(C) Champions; (L) League Leaders' Shield winners; (R) Relegated

==== Super League results ====
W Win D Draw L Loss

Super League results
Date	Round	Versus	H/A	Venue	Result	Score	Tries	Goals	Attendance	Report
11 February	1	Castleford Tigers	A	Mend-A-Hose Jungle	W	26–16	Cross, Sio, Vuniyayawa	Sneyd (7)	10,050	RLP
20 February	2	Toulouse Olympique	H	AJ Bell Stadium	W	38–12	Sio (4), Brierley, Lafai, Sneyd	Sneyd (5)	4,003	RLP
26 February	3	Hull FC	A	MKM Stadium	L	16–48	Lafai (2), Sio	Sneyd (2)	10,081	RLP
6 March	4	Huddersfield Giants	A	John Smiths Stadium	L	2–34		Sneyd	5,702	RLP
11 March	5	Hull KR	H	AJ Bell Stadium	L	16–26	Burgess, Sio, Wright	Sneyd (2)	3,950	RLP
18 March	6	Leeds Rhinos	H	AJ Bell Stadium	W	26–12	Atkin, Brierley, Sio, Taylor	Sneyd (5)	5,756	RLP
3 April	7	Wakefield Trinity	A	Be Well Support Stadium	L	24–30	Sio (2), Williams (2), Cross	Sneyd (2)	4,371	RLP
14 April	8	Warrington Wolves	A	Halliwell Jones Stadium	L	18–32	Ackers, Brierley, Sio	Sneyd (3)	8,486	RLP
18 April	9	Catalans Dragons	H	AJ Bell Stadium	L	10–36	Cross, Sio	Sneyd	3,221	RLP
24 April	10	Wigan Warriors	A	DW Stadium	L	24–30	Costello, Gerrard, Sio, Vuniyayawa	Brierley (4)	10,783	RLP
29 April	11	St Helens	A	Totally Wicked Stadium	L	10–14	Costello, Escaré	Atkin	10,988	RLP
15 May	12	Leeds Rhinos	H	AJ Bell Stadium	W	23–8	Ackers, Brierley, Burgess, Sio	Sneyd (3 + FG)	4,473	RLP
20 May	13	Castleford Tigers	H	AJ Bell Stadium	W	30–14	Burgess (3), Cross, Lafai	Sneyd (5)	5,355	RLP
5 June	14	Hull Kingston Rovers	A	Hull College Community Stadium	L	16–43	Burgess, Cross, Watkins	Sneyd	7,023	RLP
10 June	15	Wigan Warriors	H	AJ Bell Stadium	L	12–30	Cross, Watkins	Sneyd (2)	5,944	RLP
26 June	16	Wakefield Trinity	H	AJ Bell Stadium	W	74–10	Burgess (3), Brierley (2), Cross (2), Sio (2), Akauola, Croft, Lafai, Watkins	Sneyd (11)	4,047	RLP
3 July	17	Warrington Wolves	A	Halliwell Jones Stadium	W	32–24	Ormondroyd (2), Atkin, Brierley, Cross, Williams	Sneyd	8,559	RLP
10 July	18	Huddersfield Giants	N	St James' Park	L	18–30	Croft, Cross, Luckley	Sneyd (3)	25,333	RLP
17 July	19	Catalans Dragons	H	AJ Bell Stadium	W	32–6	Sio (3), Croft, Ormondroyd	Sneyd (6)	2,607	RLP
23 July	20	Toulouse Olympique	A	Stade Ernest Wallon	W	24–11	Burgess (2), Sio (2)	Sneyd (4)	3,706	RLP
31 July	21	St Helens	H	AJ Bell Stadium	W	44–12	Burgess (2), Watkins (2), Akauola, Burke, Croft, Sarginson	Sneyd (6)	6,041	RLP
7 August	22	Leeds Rhinos	A	Headingley	L	14–34	Burgess, Croft, Sio	Sneyd	14,668	RLP
13 August	23	Huddersfield Giants	H	AJ Bell Stadium	W	33–16	Brierley, Burgess, Lafai, livett, Sio, Watkins	Sneyd (4 + FG)	4,400	RLP
20 August	24	Catalans Dragons	A	Stade Gilbert Brutus	W	46–14	Watkins (2), Atkin, Brierley, Croft, Cross, Sio, Sneyd	Sneyd (5), Brierley (2)	7,133	RLP
25 August	25	Hull FC	H	John Smiths Stadium	W	28–18	Breirley, Cross, Sio, Watkins, Williams	Sneyd (4)	3,968	RLP
29 August	26	Castleford Tigers	A	Mend-A-Hose Jungle	W	50–10	Sneyd (2), Croft, Cross, Ormondroyd, Sio, Watkins, Wright	Sneyd (9)	7,322	RLP
3 September	27	Warrington Wolves	H	AJ Bell Stadium	L	14–32	Dalton-Harrop, Greenwood	Livett (3)	5,123	RLP

==== Play-offs ====
Play-off results
Date	Round	Versus	H/A	Venue	Result	Score	Tries	Goals	Attendance	Report
10 September	Eliminators	Huddersfield Giants	A	John Smiths Stadium	W	28–0	Ackers, Brierley, Burgess, Watkins	Sneyd (6)	6,374	RLP
17 September	Semi-finals	St Helens	A	Totally Wicked Stadium	L	12–19	Brierley, Watkins	Sneyd (2)	12,357	RLP

===== Team bracket =====
Eliminators
4	Catalans Dragons	10
5	Leeds Rhinos	20
3	Huddersfield Giants	0
6	Salford Red Devils	28

Semi-finals
2	Wigan Warriors	8
5	Leeds Rhinos	20
1	St Helens	19
6	Salford Red Devils	12

Grand Final
5	Leeds Rhinos	12
1	St Helens	24

Source:Rugby League Project

=== Challenge Cup ===
W Win L Loss

Challenge Cup results
Date	Round	Versus	H/A	Venue	Result	Score	Tries	Goals	Attendance	Report
27 March	6	Wigan Warriors	A	DW Stadium	L	0–20			6,005	RLP

== Squad ==
2022 Salford Red Devils squad
First team squad			Coaching staff
1 (Scotland) Ryan Brierley (gk) – FB; 2 (Australia) Ken Sio – WG; 3 (England) Kallum Watkins – SR, CE; 4 (Samoa) Tim Lafai – CE; 5 (England) Joe Burgess – WG; 6 (Australia) Brodie Croft (vc) – SO, SH; 7 (England) Marc Sneyd (gk) (vc) – SH; 8 (Tonga) Sitaleki Akauola – PR, LK; 9 (England) Andy Ackers – HK; 10 (Wales) Greg Burke – PR; 11 (Australia) Shane Wright – SR; 12 (England) James Greenwood – SR; 13 (New Zealand) Elijah Taylor (c) – LF, SR	14 (Scotland) Danny Addy – SR, LF; 15 (Fiji) King Vuniyayawa – PR; 16 (England) Ryan Lannon – SR, LF, PR; 17 (England) Harvey Livett – SR; 18 (England) Chris Atkin (gk) – SO, SH, HK; 19 (England) Jack Ormondroyd – PR, LF; 20 (England) Jack Wells – LF, PR; 21; 22 (Wales) Rhys Williams – WG; 23 (England) Dan Sarginson – CE; 24 (England) Matty Costello – CE; 25 (France) Morgan Escare – FB; 26 (Scotland) Sam Luckley – LF	27 (England) Amir Bourouh – HK; 28 (England) Deon Cross – CE; 29 (England) Alex Gerrard – PR, LF; 32 (England) Tyler Dupree – PR	Head coach: Paul Rowley; Assistant coaches: Kurt Haggerty; Danny Orr; Legend: (c) Captain(s); (vc) Vice-captain(s); Updated: 25 December 2021; Source(s): 2022 squad numbers
