= Lee St Hilaire =

English RL coach and former rugby league footballer

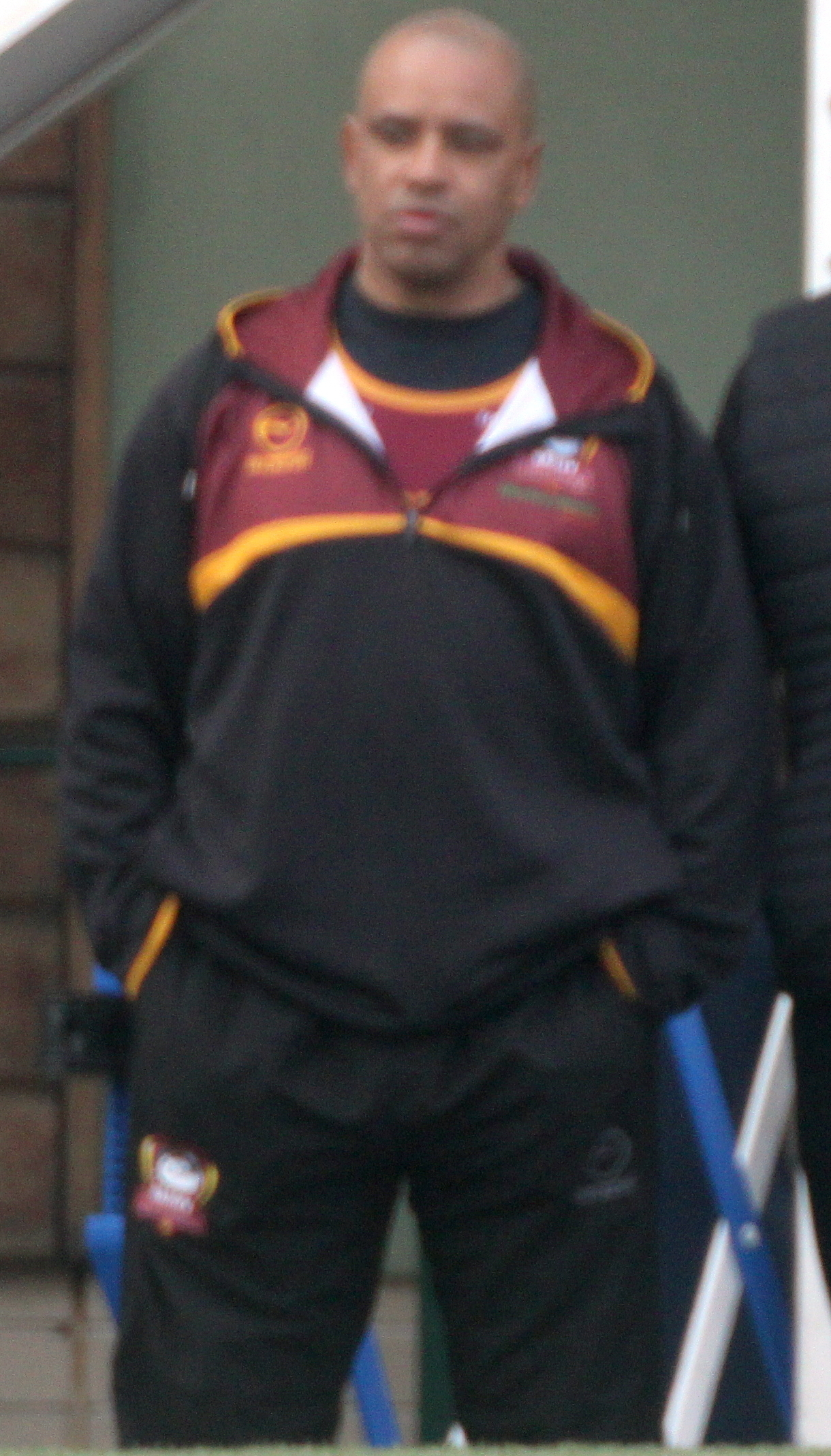

Personal information
- Full name: Lee St Hilaire
- Born: 15 February 1967 (age 59) Huddersfield, England

Playing information
- Position: Hooker
Club
Years	Team	Pld	T	G	FG	P
1986–97	Huddersfield Giants	188	37	7	0	162
1991	Keighley Cougars	6	2	0	0	8
1997	Castleford Tigers	6	0	0	0	0
1998–99	Hunslet Hawks	43	5	0	0	20
	Total	243	44	7	0	190

Coaching information
Club
Years	Team	Gms	W	D	L	W%
2010	Bradford Bulls

Lee St Hilaire (born 15 February 1967) is an English former professional rugby league footballer who played in the 1980s and 1990s, and coached in the 2000s. He played at club level for the Huddersfield Giants, Castleford Tigers, Keighley and the Hunslet Hawks, as a hooker.

== Coaching career ==
After retiring as a player, St Hilaire returned to Huddersfield on the coaching staff, eventually becoming the club's Senior Academy coach. He left the club in March 2006 and joined Wakefield Trinity Wildcats to become assistant coach to Tony Smith. He left the club when Smith was sacked, and became assistant coach to Steve McNamara at Bradford Bulls later that year.

He was appointed as caretaker coach for the remainder of the 2010 season following the release of McNamara. He returned as Bradford's assistant coach in 2012 under Francis Cummins. He departed the club following Cummins' sacking in 2014.

== Personal life ==
Lee St Hilaire is the brother of former rugby league footballer, Marcus St Hilaire.
