= Bradford Bulls =

English rugby league football club

Club information
- Full name: Bradford Bulls Rugby League Football Club
- Nickname(s): The Bulls; Northern; Steam Pigs
- Short name: Bradford Bulls
- Colours: Red, amber, black, and white
- Founded: 1863; 163 years ago (as Bradford FC)
- Website: bradfordbulls.co.uk

Current details
- Ground: Odsal Stadium (26,019)
- CEO: Jason Hirst
- Coach: Kurt Haggerty
- Captain: Joe Mellor
- Competition: Super League
- 2026 season: 14th
- Current season

Uniforms
Home colours

Records
- Championships: 6 (1979–80, 1980–81, 1997, 2001, 2003, 2005)
- Challenge Cups: 5 (1944, 1947, 1949, 2000, 2003)
- World Club Challenges: 3 (2002, 2004, 2006)

The Bradford Bulls are a professional rugby league club in Bradford, West Yorkshire, England and compete in the Super League the top flight in British rugby league.

The club has won the League Championship six times, the Challenge Cup five times and three World Club Challenge titles. They have also won many smaller competitions such as The RFL Yorkshire Cup 11 times.

The club was originally founded as Bradford Northern, but was renamed Bradford Bulls in 1995. Bradford's main rivalries are with Leeds, Halifax and Huddersfield. They have played for the majority of their existence at Odsal and their traditional kit colours are white with red, amber and black bands.

== History ==
=== 1863–1907: Bradford F.C. ===
The original Bradford Football Club was formed in 1863 and played rugby football, subsequently joining the Rugby Football Union. Initially the club played at Horton Cricket Ground, All Saints Road but were asked to leave because of damage to the pitch. They then moved to Laisteridge Lane and later North Park Road in Manningham. A nomadic existence continued as they then went on to Peel Park, then Girlington and Apperley Bridge.

Bradford Football Club and Bradford Cricket Club bought Park Avenue in 1879 and this resulted in the club becoming "Bradford Cricket, Athletic and Football Club". The club's headquarters were at the Talbot Darley Street, and later The Alexandra, Great Horton Road. The club achieved its first major success by winning the Yorkshire Cup in 1884.

After the 1890–91 season, Bradford along with other Yorkshire Senior clubs Batley, Brighouse, Dewsbury, Halifax, Huddersfield, Hull, Hunslet, Leeds, Liversedge, Manningham and Wakefield decided that they wanted their own county league starting in 1891 along the lines of a similar competition that had been played in Lancashire. The clubs wanted full control of the league but the Yorkshire Rugby Football Union would not sanction the competition as it meant giving up control of rugby football to the senior clubs.

In 1895, along with cross-town neighbours Manningham F.C., Bradford was among 22 clubs to secede from the Rugby Football Union after the historic meeting at the George Hotel in Huddersfield in response to a dispute over "broken time" payments to players who were thus part-time professionals. These 22 clubs formed the Northern Rugby Football Union (which eventually became the Rugby Football League) and rugby league football was born.

Bradford enjoyed some success in the new competition. In the 1903–04 Northern Rugby Football Union season, the team finished level on points with Salford at the top of the league and then won the resulting play-off 5–0. In 1905–06, Bradford beat Salford 5–0 to win the Challenge Cup and were runners-up in the Championship. In 1906–07, Bradford won the Yorkshire County Cup 8–5 against Hull Kingston Rovers.

During this time Manningham F.C. had run into financial difficulties and, despite a summer archery contest that generated enough money to ensure their survival, its members were persuaded to swap codes and play association football instead. Manningham was invited to join the Football League in 1903, in an attempt to promote football in a rugby-dominated region, and the newly renamed Bradford City A.F.C. was voted into full membership of the Second Division without having played a game of football, having a complete team or even being able to guarantee a ground. The creation of Bradford City led to demands for association football at Park Avenue too. The ground had already hosted some football matches including one in the 1880s between Blackburn Rovers and Blackburn Olympic F.C. In 1895, a Bradford side had defeated a team from Moss Side, Manchester, with a 4–1 scoreline in front of 3,000 spectators.

Following the change at Bradford City, a meeting was called of the Bradford FC members on 15 April 1907 to decide the rugby club's future. An initial vote appeared to favour continuing in rugby league, but then opinion shifted towards rugby union and the chairman, Mr Briggs, used his influence to swing the committee behind the proposed move to association football. This act, sometimes referred to as "The Great Betrayal", led to Bradford FC becoming the Bradford Park Avenue Association Football Club. The minority faction decided to split and form a new club to continue playing in the Northern Union, appropriately called "Bradford Northern", which applied for and was granted Bradford FC's place in the 1907–08 Northern Rugby Football Union season. Bradford Northern's first home ground was the Greenfield Athletic Ground in Dudley Hill, to the south of the city. They based themselves at the Greenfield Hotel.

=== 1907–1963: Bradford Northern ===
Northern moved to part of the Bowling Old Lane cricket ground at Birch Lane in 1908, although, at times, the club also had to hire Valley Parade as the capacity at Birch Lane was insufficient for large matches. Bradford Council offered the club a site for a new stadium between Rooley Lane and Mayo Avenue in 1927. However, the NRFU said the site was too small and the club kept on looking.

On 20 June 1933, Bradford Northern signed a ten-year lease with Bradford council for a former quarry being used as a waste dump at Odsal Top. It was turned into the biggest stadium outside Wembley. The Bradford Northern team played its first match there on 1 September 1934.

Success came to Bradford in the 1940s with a number of cup wins: the Yorkshire Cup in 1940–41, 1942–43, 1944–45, 1945–46, 1948–49 and 1949–50; and the Challenge Cup 1943–44, 1946–47 and 1948–49. In the Championship Bradford found it difficult to win either before the war or after despite being runners up in 1942–43 and 1947–48. On Saturday 3 November 1945, Bradford Northern met Wakefield Trinity in the final of the Yorkshire Cup held at Thrum Hall, Halifax. Wakefield began the match as favourites, they had lost only one of thirteen matches thus far in the season. However, Bradford won 5–2 Frank Whitcombe scoring the try converted by George Carmichael and lifted the Yorkshire Cup for the fourth time in six seasons.

Bradford defeated Leeds 8–4 to win the Challenge Cup Final at Wembley in 1947. The 1947–48 Challenge Cup final was notable as it was the first rugby league match to be attended by the reigning monarch, King George VI, who presented the trophy. It was also the first televised rugby league match as it was broadcast to the Midlands. Bradford lost 8–3 to Wigan and Frank Whitcombe became the first player to win the Lance Todd trophy on the losing side. The 1949 Challenge Cup final was sold out for the first time as 95,050 spectators saw Bradford beat Halifax. In 1951–52 Bradford were runners up in the league but beat New Zealand at Odsal in the first floodlit football match of any code in the North of England.

In 1953, a crowd of 69,429 watched Bradford play Huddersfield in the Challenge Cup's third round. This was Bradford's highest ever attendance. They also won the Yorkshire Cup final 7–2 against Hull. Bradford and Leigh were the first rugby league clubs to stage matches on a Sunday in December 1954, although there was opposition from the Sunday Observance lobby.

Bradford's support declined rapidly in the 1963 season, attracting a record low crowd of 324 against Barrow. The club went out of business on 10 December 1963, having played just 13 matches; winning 1 and losing 12, scoring 109 points and conceding 284, the results were declared null and void, and expunged from the 1963–64 season's records.

=== 1964–1995: Third club ===
A meeting on 14 April 1964 saw 1,500 people turn out to discuss the formation of a new club, and those present promised a £1000 to help get plans for the new organisation underway. Amongst those who led proceedings were former players Joe Phillips and Trevor Foster. On 20 July 1964, Bradford Northern (1964) Ltd came into existence. The club's new side had been built for around £15,000 and had Jack Wilkinson as coach. On 22 August 1964, Hull Kingston Rovers provided the opposition in the reformed club's first match and 14,500 spectators turned out to show their support, as Odsal hosted its first 10,000 plus gate for a Bradford Northern match since 1957.

The reformed club won its first cup in 1965–66 by beating Hunslet 17–8 in the final of the Yorkshire County Cup. In 1972–73 Bradford lost the Challenge Cup final against Featherstone Rovers 33–14. In 1973–74 Bradford won the Second Division Championship and were promoted back to the First Division. During this season Keith Mumby made his début, becoming the Bradford's youngest player at only 16 years of age, kicking 12 goals and scoring a try in the match against Doncaster. He went on to make a record 576 appearances for the club. In 1974–75 Bradford won the Regal Trophy 3–2 against Widnes.

Peter Fox joined Bradford as coach for the first time in 1977–78. Bradford won the Premiership final 17–8 against Widnes and were also Championship runners-up.

In 1978–79 Bradford appeared in another Premiership final this time losing 24–2 to Leeds. A year later Bradford won the Championship and Regal Trophy, Peter Fox winning the award for Coach of the Year. In 1980–81 the club made it back-to-back championships. In 1981–82, Bradford lost the Yorkshire Cup final 10–5 against Castleford and lost again in 1982–83, this time 18–7 against Hull F.C. Keith Mumby won the award for First Division Player of the Year while Brian Noble won the Young Player award.

In 1985, Ellery Hanley left Northern to join Wigan for a then record transfer deal, worth £80,000 and a player exchange involving Steve Donlan and Phil Ford. By November 1987, Bradford had cash-flow problems and the local council refused to help financially, but appointed a special committee to administer the clubs' finances. In December 1987, desperate for cash, Bradford transfer-listed 22 players for a total of £210,000 plus Phil Ford for £120,000.

In 1987–88 Bradford won the Yorkshire Cup final replay against Castleford 11–2 after drawing 12–12. Ron Willey coached Bradford Northern for a short stint in 1989–90 and led them to the Premiership final and success in the Yorkshire Cup final when they beat Featherstone Rovers 20–14.

David Hobbs became coach at Northern in 1990 until he left for Wakefield Trinity in 1994. Bradford lost the Regal Trophy against Warrington 12–2 in 1990–91. Peter Fox returned to Bradford for a second spell as coach in 1991, and in 1993–94, Bradford finished as runners-up behind Wigan on points difference. Fox left the club in 1995.

=== 1996–2011: Golden era ===
In 1996, the first tier of English rugby league clubs changed from a winter to a summer season and played the inaugural Super League season. Bradford dropped the 'Northern' name to become Bradford Bulls. The city's MPs objected to this and filed an Early Day Motion in Parliament protesting against the change. Australian Brian Smith took over as head coach in 1995, with Matthew Elliott as his assistant. The Bulls won the Super League title in the 1997 season, the last before the Play off/ Grand Final structure was implemented in 1998.

When Smith left, Elliot coached the Bradford Bulls to the 1999 Super League Grand Final and in 2000 the Bulls won the Challenge Cup for the first time in 51 years with victory over Leeds in Edinburgh.

Brian Noble was appointed Bradford head coach in November 2000. Noble took the Bradford Bulls to the 2001 Super League Grand Final in which they defeated the Wigan Warriors. As Super League VI champions, the Bulls played against 2001 NRL Premiers, the Newcastle Knights in the 2002 World Club Challenge. Noble oversaw Bradford's victory. He took the Bulls to the 2002 Super League Grand Final which was lost to St. Helens.

On 20 April 2006, Steve McNamara was promoted to head coach of Bradford following Brian Noble's departure to Wigan. At the time he was the youngest coach in Britain. In his first season in charge, he guided Bradford to the Super League play-offs before the club were knocked out in the grand final eliminator by Hull

Following an eighth consecutive defeat, the Bulls' worst run in Super League, McNamara's contract was mutually terminated on 13 July 2010. Lee St Hilaire was coach for the rest of the 2010 season.

Mick Potter became coach in 2011. Despite the club being placed in receivership in 2012, the team was on the verge of making the semi-finals of Super League as Potter remained as unpaid coach.

=== 2012–2017: Administrations, relegation and liquidation ===
In March 2012 the club announced that it was in financial difficulties and needed £1 million to keep the club afloat. A public appeal saw a lot of new funds pour in from supporters, but following the issue of a winding up petition from HMRC for unpaid taxes the holding company for the club was forced to go into administration on 26 June 2012. The Rugby Football League announced that had the company been wound up then the team would be allowed to complete their fixtures for the 2012 Super League season under the possible ownership of a supporters trust. On 2 July 2012, the club's administrator, Brendan Guilfoyle, made sixteen members of staff, including the coach Mick Potter and chief executive Ryan Duckett, redundant, but announced that the club would attempt to fulfill its fixtures. Mick Potter continued as an unpaid coach until the end of the season. On 31 August 2012 a bid for the club from a local consortium, headed by Bradford businessman Omar Khan, was accepted by the administrator and was ratified by the RFL in early September. Days later the RFL also granted the new owners a one-year probationary licence enabling the club to compete in Super League XVIII in 2013.

Francis Cummins was appointed as head coach of the Bulls in September 2012. During the 2012/13 season the Bulls appointed Dr Allan Johnston to the backroom staff to support the players wellbeing and performance. This appointment was thought to be the first of its kind in Rugby League. In late December 2013 it was announced that chairman Mark Moore and directors Ian Watt and Andrew Calvert had resigned.

In 2014, relegation was reintroduced to the Super League with two teams being relegated. Bradford were deducted 6 points for entering administration early on in the season and the Bulls were relegated from the top division of rugby league in Britain for the first time in 40 years. Francis Cummins was sacked around the time of relegation and replaced by James Lowes and won most of their remaining games.

Bradford began their first Championship campaign in 40 years against Leigh away where they narrowly lost the game. By the end of the regular season they entered the Super 8s finishing second. In the Qualifiers Bradford failed to make the top three for automatic entry to Super League for 2016, finishing 5th which meant a trip to Wakefield to play them in the first ever Million Pound Game. Bradford would lose 24–16, condemning them to a second year in the Championship.

In preparation for the 2016 season, Bradford completed the signings of several experienced players, such as Centre Kris Welham from Super League side Hull Kingston Rovers, as well as Oscar Thomas, Mitch Clark, Johnny Campbell, Jonathan Walker and Kurt Haggerty from London Broncos, Doncaster, Batley and Leigh. Bradford started the season strongly, with a win over fellow promotion hopefuls Featherstone Rovers by 22–12. Omari Caro scored a hat-trick in this match. This was followed up by away wins at Whitehaven and Swinton. Bradford's season was ultimately disappointing with failure to reach the Qualifiers, this meant Bradford would miss out on a chance of promotion

On 14 November 2016, Bradford Bulls were placed in administration for the third time since 2012. On 16 November, the Rugby Football League (RFL) cancelled Bradford's membership, making their future uncertain. In the ensuing weeks several bids to buy the club were made but despite one bid being acceptable to the RFL, none were accepted by the administrator and the club went into liquidation on 3 January 2017.

Following liquidation the RFL issued a statement saying:

While a number of alternatives were considered the Board was most mindful of the planning already undertaken by all other clubs in the competition structure, the season tickets already purchased and the players and staff who will now be seeking employment in and around the sport in 2017. Accordingly the Board has agreed that the wider interests of the sport is best satisfied if it offers a place in the Kingstone Press Championship to any new club in Bradford and that such a club start the 2017 season on minus 12 points. The RFL believes that Rugby League needs Bradford and that Bradford deserves a strong and stable professional club and will work with all interested parties to deliver that outcome.

=== 2017–2019: Fourth club ===
After the Bulls went into liquidation in January 2017 the Rugby Football League invited bids to form a new club based in Bradford who would be allowed to take the place of the Bulls in the 2017 Championship but started with a 12-point penalty deduction.

The RFL issued a set of criteria for anyone wishing to bid for the new club and there were 12 expressions of interest of which four were converted into bids submitted to the RFL. On 13 January the RFL announced that a consortium to run the new club had been selected and notified of the decision. The new owner was publicly announced on 17 January as Andrew Chalmers, the former chairman of the New Zealand Rugby League. Also involved is former player and coach, Graham Lowe.

The parent company of the club is registered as Bradford Bulls 2017 Limited at Companies House, and the team continue to be known as Bradford Bulls, also retaining the club colours, stadium and several players from the 2016 squad. On 20 January 2017 Geoff Toovey was named as coach and Leon Pryce as captain. However, a delay in processing his paperwork left Toovey unable to fulfil his role and led to Leigh Beattie being appointed as interim coach.

Before the start of the 2018 season, the Bulls appointed the highly experienced John Kear as coach, and under his guidance, gained promotion to the Championship.

=== 2019–2025: Move to Dewsbury and Return to Odsal ===
In August 2019, Bulls chairman Andrew Chalmers announced that the club could no longer afford to play at Odsal and were to relocate to Dewsbury for two years after the preferred alternatives, Valley Parade and Horsfall Stadium were deemed too expensive. On 1 September 2019, Bradford Bulls played the last game at Odsal stadium for the next year and a half, and bade a temporary farewell to the 85-year-old home ground for the team. In November 2019, Nigel Wood, Mark Sawyer, and Eric Perez took over the ownership of the club, although Perez's involvement would only be temporary, as interim chair for a few months. The Bulls returned to Odsal in May 2021. In the 2022 RFL Championship season, Bradford finished a disappointing 9th on the table. In the 2023 and 2024 RFL Championship seasons, Bradford managed to reach the semi-finals in both seasons but fell short after two losses to Toulouse Olympique.

=== 2025–present: Return to Super League ===
Following the 2025 season, Bradford were promoted back to the Super League for the 2026 season under the recently introduced IMG grading system. In Bradford's first season back in the Super League, the club finished bottom of the table.

== Stadiums ==
=== 1907–1933: Greenfield and Birch Lane ===
The Bradford Northern club had played at a number of venues including the Greenfield Athletic Ground in Dudley Hill and Bowling Old Lane Cricket Club's ground in Birch Lane. By the early 1920s, however, Birch Lane's limitations were clear and Northern began to seek another home. Precarious finances prevented the club being able to take up an offer to develop land off Rooley Lane or to upgrade and move back to Greenfield, but in 1933, Bradford City Council gave them the opportunity to transform land at Odsal Top into their home ground.

=== 1934–Present: Odsal ===
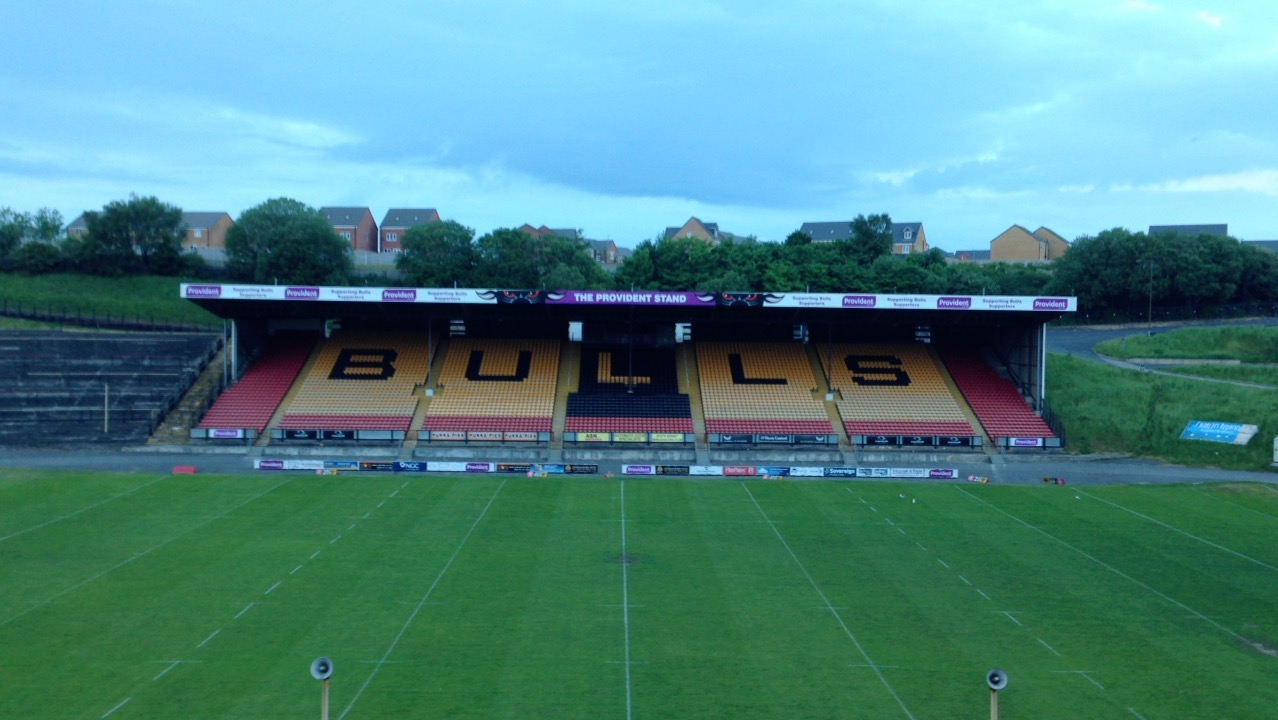

Apart from two seasons in 2001 and 2002 when the Bradford Bulls played their home games at Valley Parade, groundsharing with football club Bradford City A.F.C, prior to leaving Odsal for Crown Flatt, Dewsbury in 2019, Odsal Stadium has been the home ground of Bradford Northern/Bulls since 1934 along with regular speedway and stock car racing meetings over the years, BriSCA F1 Stock Cars and BriSCA F2 Stock Cars. having returned to Odsal since 2021. Odsal Stadium had also hosted many other sports, including association football, American football, basketball, featuring the Harlem Globetrotters, wrestling, show jumping and kabaddi. The stadium's largest attendances was 102,569, when Halifax played Warrington on 5 May 1954 in the Challenge Cup Final replay.

Due to financial concerns amidst rising administration costs of using the single-use RFL-owned stadium, the rent reported to be £450,000 rent per year, the Bradford Bulls left Odsal in 2019, temporarily playing at Crown Flatt in Dewsbury including home matches of the COVID-19 abandoned rugby league season of 2020 plus three league fixtures of the 2021 season, however they returned to Odsal during the 2021 season when stock car promotors YorStox successfully returned professional stock car racing as co-tenants at the now multi-use venue, absorbing stadium hire costs, a flattened shale track laid to re-enable motorsports events. The Bulls' acting chief executive, Mark Sawyer, told Rugby League Live at the time: "Staging motorsport events is the first piece in the jigsaw puzzle towards how we're going to balance the books at Odsal", stressing that he believed Bulls supporters were positive about the return of motorsports, quoted as saying "The feedback we get from our Bradford supporter base is that a number of them are interested in watching motorsport.

In September 2024 it was revealed that the Bradford Bulls had issued a warning surrounding the club's finances, calling for more financial support from the RFL. Despite a £22,000 profit in their latest set of accounts, the chief executive Jason Hirst warned it will take the increasing backing of owners, benefactors, sponsors, supporters and volunteers to keep the Bulls in the black.

== Crest and colours ==
=== Crest ===
Up until the Super League era the club was known as Bradford Northern and used a stylised boar's head similar to the one atop the Bradford city coat of arms. When the club was rebranded Bradford Bulls the crest was changed to a similar design to that of the Chicago Bulls.

=== Colours ===
Bradford's traditional playing colours are a red, amber and black hoop, on a white background. Bradford's home strips are predominantly white with a red, amber and black hoop or "V". Away strips have had many designs and colours, but usually integrate the traditional red, amber and black into the design. In some cases, Bradford have been known to have a third kit that has had many different designs such as the 2024 season where the third kit pays homage to a shirt, the design of which was 90 years old to celebrate the time they have spent at Odsal.

== Kit sponsors and manufacturers ==
Year	Kit Manufacturer	Main Shirt Sponsor
1980–1986	Umbro	SGS Glazing
1986–1987	Umbro	Wang Computers
1987–1992	Umbro	Samuel Websters
1992–1995	Ellgreen	Vaux Breweries
1996–1997	Mitre	Compaq
1998	Asics	Compaq
1999	Asics	Asics
2000	Joe Bloggs Clothing	Asics
2001	Joe Bloggs Clothing	Skylark
2002	Joe Bloggs Clothing	JCT600
2003	BULLSNET.COM	JCT600
2004–2006	ISC	JCT600
2007–2012	KooGa	JCT600
2013–2016	ISC	Provident Financial
2017	ISC	Utilita Energy
2018	ISC	Visionon.net
2019	Kappa	Lowe
2020	Kappa	Sedulo
2021–2023	Steeden	Sedulo
2024	Kappa	Varleys Builders Merchant
2025–2026	Elgren	Topnotch
2027–	hummel	Bartercard

== Rivalries ==
Bradford's main rivals historically whilst playing in the Super League, were the Leeds Rhinos who they have played in multiple finals, especially during the early years of the competition, and also the Huddersfield Giants and St Helens whom they faced in two successive Challenge cup finals during the golden era. Since the Bulls were relegated to the RL Championship in 2014, their main local rivalry is now between themselves and the Halifax Panthers, the Championship a division below the Super League.

They also have a lesser local rivalry with Keighley Cougars, although this was arguably considered a one-way rivalry as competitive fixtures were rare since they mostly played in different divisions.

== 2027 squad ==
2027 Bradford Bulls squad
First team squad			Coaching staff
(England) Andy Ackers – HK; (Wales) Caleb Aekins – FB, SO; (England) Cameron Bate – PR, LF; (England) John Bateman – SR, CE, LF; (Scotland) James Bell – LF, SR; (Ireland) James Bentley – SR; (Fiji) Waqa Blake – CE, WG; (England) Nathan Connell – FB, WG; (England) Eribe Doro – PR; (England) Sam Eseh – PR; (Australia) Zac Fulton – SR, LF	(England) Will Gardiner – LF, PR; (England) Riley Gelder – LF; (Ireland) Jamie Gill – PR; (England) Luke Hooley – FB; (England) Alfie Leake – PR; (Australia) Loghan Lewis – PR; (Cook Islands) Esan Marsters – CE, SO, FB; (England) Joe Mellor (c) – LF, HK, SO; (England) Rowan Milnes – SH, SO; (New Zealand) Jayden Nikorima (vc) – SO, SH, FB; (Australia) Jayden Okunbor – WG, CE; (England) Jack Ormondroyd – PR; (Albania) Eliot Peposhi – SR, LF	(England) Leon Ruan – SR; (Ireland) Ethan Ryan – WG, FB, CE; (Samoa) Ligi Sao – PR, SR; (England) Cameron Scott – CE, WG; (England) Ebon Scurr – PR; (Australia) Aidan Sezer – SH, SO; (England) Ryan Sutton (vc) – PR, LF; (Scotland) Lachlan Walmsley – WG, FB; (England) Connor Wynne – CE, FB, WG	Head coach: (Ireland) Kurt Haggerty; Assistant coaches: (England) Carl Forster; (England) Lee Greenwood; Legend: (c) Captain(s); (vc) Vice-captain(s)

== 2027 transfers ==
=== Gains ===
Player	From	Contract	Date
(England) Sam Eseh	Wigan Warriors	3 years	8 June 2026
(England) Cameron Scott	Wakefield Trinity	2 years	17 June 2026
(Scotland) Lachlan Walmsley	Wakefield Trinity	2 years	6 October 2026
(England) John Bateman	North Queensland Cowboys	2 years	4 August 2026
(Ireland) James Bentley	Warrington Wolves	3 years	14 August 2026
(Samoa) Ligi Sao	Hull FC	1 year	31 August 2026
(Scotland) James Bell	Hull FC	2 years	10 November 2026
(Australia) Aidan Sezer	Hull FC	1 years	16 November 2026
(England) Nathan Connell	Widnes Vikings	2 years	4 September 2026
(England) Jack Ormondroyd	Oldham	1 year	11 September 2026

=== Losses ===
Player	To	Contract	Date
(England) Guy Armitage			
(England) Chris Atkin			
(Australia) Phoenix Steinwede	Canberra Raiders	1 year	13 September 2026
(Australia) Mitch Souter	Norths Devils	1 year	16 September 2026
(Ireland) Riley Dean	Halifax Panthers	1 year	21 September 2026
(England) Brandon Douglas	Halifax Panthers	1 year	8 October 2026
(England) Sam Hallas	Dewsbury Rams	2 years	30 September 2026
(Ireland) Joe Keyes	Sporting Olympique Avignon	1 year	24 October 2026

=== Retired ===
Player	Date
(Papua New Guinea) Dan Russell	19 November 2026

== Players ==
=== Notable former players ===
==== Harry Sunderland Trophy winners ====
The Harry Sunderland Trophy is awarded to the Man-of-the-Match in the Super League Grand Final by the Rugby League Writers' Association.

Season	Recipient
1977–78	(England) Bob Haigh
1999	(New Zealand) Henry Paul
2001	(England) Michael Withers
2002	(England) Paul Deacon
2003	(England) Stuart Reardon
2005	(England) Leon Pryce

==== Lance Todd Trophy winners ====
The Lance Todd Trophy is awarded to the Man-of-the-Match in the Challenge Cup Final. Introduced in 1946, the trophy was named in memory of Lance Todd, the New Zealand-born player and administrator, who was killed in a road accident during the Second World War.

Season	Recipient	Position
1947	(Wales) Willie Davies	Stand-off
1948	(Wales) Frank Whitcombe	Prop
1949	(England) Ernest Ward	Fullback
1996	(New Zealand) Robbie Paul	Fullback
2000	(New Zealand) Henry Paul	Stand-off

==== Steve Prescott Man of Steel winners ====
The Steve Prescott Man of Steel Award is an annual honour, awarded by the Super League to the most outstanding player in the British game for that year.

Year	Winner	Position
1985	(England) Ellery Hanley	Loose forward
1997	(England) James Lowes	Hooker
1998	(England) Jamie Peacock	Second row

==== Treble winning team ====
This list contains the players who played in the Challenge Cup, Grand Final.

Nat	#	Name
(New Zealand)	1	Robbie Paul
(Tonga)	2	Tevita Vaikona
(England)	3	Leon Pryce
(New Zealand)	4	Shontayne Hape
(Tonga)	5	Lesley Vainikolo
(Australia)	6	Michael Withers
(England)	7	Paul Deacon
(New Zealand)	8	Joe Vagana
(England)	9	James Lowes
(England)	10	Paul Anderson
(Australia)	11	Daniel Gartner
(England)	12	Jamie Peacock
(England)	13	Mike Forshaw
(England)	14	Lee Gilmour
(England)	15	Karl Pratt
(Australia)	16	Alex Wilkinson
(England)	17	Stuart Reardon
(England)	18	Lee Radford
(England)	19	Jamie Langley
(England)	20	Scott Naylor
(England)	22	Karl Pryce
(England)	26	Chris Bridge
(England)	27	Rob Parker
(England)	29	Stuart Fielden
(England)	30	Richard Moore

=== Captains ===
From 1996 -

- Robbie Paul 1996–04
- Jamie Peacock 2005
- Iestyn Harris 2006
- Paul Deacon 2007–09
- Andy Lynch 2010–11
- Heath L'Estrange 2012–13
- Matt Diskin 2012–14
- Chev Walker 2015
- Adrian Purtell 2016
- Leon Pryce 2017
- Sam Hallas/Scott Moore 2017
- Lee Smith 2018
- Steve Crossley 2019–2023
- Michael Lawrence 2023–2025

== Staff ==
=== Past coaches ===
Also see Category:Bradford Bulls coaches

- 1936–60 Dai Rees
- 1960–61 Trevor Foster
- 1961 Doug Greenall
- 1961–62 Jimmy Ledgard
- 1962–63 Harry Beverley
- 1963 Jack Wilkinson
- 1964–71 Gus Risman
- 1971–72 Harry Street
- 1973–75 Ian Brooke
- 1975 Albert Fearnley
- 1975–77 Roy Francis
- 1977–85 Peter Fox
- 1985–89 Barry Seabourne
- 1989 David Hobbs
- 1989–90 Ron Willey
- 1990–93 David Hobbs
- 1993–95 Peter Fox
- 1995–96 Brian Smith
- 1996–2000 Matthew Elliott
- 2001–06 Brian Noble
- 2006–10 Steve McNamara
- 2010 Lee St Hilaire
- 2011–12 Mick Potter
- 2013–14 Francis Cummins
- 2014 Matt Diskin
- 2014–16 James Lowes
- 2016–17 Rohan Smith
- 2017 Geoff Toovey
- 2018–22 John Kear
- 2022–23 Mark Dunning
- 2023 Lee Greenwood (interim)
- 2024 Eamon O'Carroll
- 2025 Brian Noble
- 2026 Kurt Haggerty

== Seasons ==
=== League history ===
- 1907–1973: Division 1
- 1973–1974: Division 2
- 1974–2014: Division 1 / Super League
- 2015–2017: Championship
- 2018: League 1
- 2019–2025: Championship
- 2026–Present: Super league

=== Super League era ===
Season	League									Play-offs	Challenge Cup	Other competitions		Name	Tries	Name	Points
Season	Division	P	W	D	L	F	A	Pts	Pos	Play-offs	Challenge Cup	Other competitions		Top try scorer		Top point scorer	
1996	Super League	22	17	0	5	767	409	34	3rd		RU			(New Zealand) Robbie Paul	23	(England) Steve McNamara	170
1997	Super League	22	20	0	2	769	397	40	1st		RU			(England) James Lowes	17	(England) Steve McNamara	299
1998	Super League	23	12	0	11	498	450	24	5th	Lost in Elimination Playoffs	R5			(Tonga) Tevita Vaikona	13	(England) Steve McNamara	170
1999	Super League	30	25	1	4	897	445	51	1st	Lost in Grand Final	SF			(Australia) Michael Withers	21	(England) Steve McNamara	221
2000	Super League	28	20	3	5	1004	408	43	3rd	Lost in Preliminary Final	W			(New Zealand) Robbie Paul	19	(New Zealand) Henry Paul	404
2001	Super League	28	22	1	5	1120	474	45	1st	Won in Grand Final	RU			(Australia) Michael Withers	31	(New Zealand) Henry Paul	457
2002	Super League	28	23	0	5	910	519	46	1st	Lost in Grand Final	R4	World Club Challenge	W	(Australia) Michael Withers	20	(England) Paul Deacon	336
2003	Super League	28	22	0	6	878	529	44	1st	Won in Grand Final	W			(New Zealand) Lesley Vainikolo	26	(England) Paul Deacon	389
2004	Super League	28	20	1	7	918	565	41	2nd	Lost in Grand Final	R4	World Club Challenge	W	(New Zealand) Lesley Vainikolo	39	(England) Paul Deacon	282
2005	Super League	28	18	1	9	1038	684	37	3rd	Won in Grand Final	R5			(New Zealand) Lesley Vainikolo	34	(England) Paul Deacon	391
2006	Super League	28	16	2	10	802	568	32	4th	Lost in Preliminary Final	R5	World Club Challenge	W	(New Zealand) Shontayne Hape	22	(England) Paul Deacon	277
2007	Super League	27	17	1	9	778	560	33	3rd	Lost in Elimination Playoffs	SF			(New Zealand) Lesley Vainikolo	19	(England) Paul Deacon	244
2008	Super League	27	14	0	13	705	625	28	5th	Lost in Elimination Playoffs	QF			(Fiji) Semi Tadulala	23	(England) Paul Deacon	190
2009	Super League	27	12	1	14	653	668	25	9th		R4			(Fiji) Semi Tadulala	14	(England) Paul Deacon	201
2010	Super League	27	9	1	17	528	728	19	10th		QF			(Australia) Brett Kearney/ (Australia) Steve Menzies	14	(England) Paul Sykes	114
2011	Super League	27	9	2	16	570	826	20	10th		R5			(New Zealand) Patrick Ah Van/ (Australia) Shad Royston	12	(New Zealand) Patrick Ah Van	242
2012	Super League	27	14	1	12	633	756	23	9th		R5			(Australia) Brett Kearney/ (England) Elliott Whitehead	15	(England) Luke Gale	143
2013	Super League	27	10	2	15	640	658	22	9th		R5			(Malta) Jarrod Sammut	25	(Malta) Jarrod Sammut	167
2014	Super League	27	8	0	19	512	984	10	13th		QF			(England) Luke Gale	14	(England) Luke Gale	147
2015	Championship	23	18	1	4	828	387	37	2nd		R5			(England) Danny Williams	25	(England) Ryan Shaw	286
2015	The Qualifiers	7	3	0	4	167	240	6	5th		R5			(England) Danny Williams	25	(England) Ryan Shaw	286
2016	Championship	23	13	2	8	717	446	28	5th	Won in Shield Final	R4			(England) Kris Welham	29	(England) Danny Addy	193
2017	Championship	23	6	0	17	500	719	0	12th		R4			(England) James Bentley	18	(England) Oscar Thomas	139
2018	League 1	26	23	0	3	1197	282	46	2nd	Won in Promotion Playoff Final	R5			(England) Ethan Ryan	36	(Australia) Dane Chisholm	312
2019	Championship	27	16	1	10	717	522	33	6th		QF	1895 Cup	R2	(England) Ethan Ryan	20	(England) Joe Keyes	136
2020	Championship (Note: The 2020 Championship was abandoned due to the COVID-19 pandemic in the United Kingdom. Statistics shown are those at time of abandonment and are not official.)	4	2	0	2	90	60	4	7th	None Played	R5			(England) Matty Dawson-Jones	4	(England) Rowan Milnes	44
2021	Championship	20	12	0	8	514	501	24	5th	Lost in Elimination Playoffs	R3 (Note: Officially round 1 due to the competitions temporary restructure in 2021.)	1895 Cup	R1	(England) Joe Brown	10	(England) Danny Brough	109
2022	Championship	27	11	0	16	523	677	22	9th		R5			(England) Kieran Gill	18	(England) Dec Patton	178
2023	Championship	27	16	1	10	677	572	33	3rd	Lost in Semi-final	R5			(England) Kieran Gill	21	(England) Dec Patton	166
2024	Championship	26	16	2	8	682	387	34	3rd	Lost in Semi-final	R4	1895 Cup	SF				
2025	Championship	24	18	0	6	678	366	36	3rd (Note: IMG promotion)	Lost in Semi-final	R4	1895 Cup	SF				
2026	Super League	27	7	0	20	468	852	14	14th		R4						

== Honours ==
=== League ===
- Division 1 / Super League:

Winners (6): 1979–80, 1980–81, 1997, 2001, 2003, 2005

- League Leader's Shield:

Winners (1): 2003

- Division 2 / Championship:

Winners (1): 1973–74

- Championship Shield:

Winners (1): 2016

- Division 3 / League 1:

- League 1 Play-offs:

Winners (1): 2018

- Premiership:

Winners (1): 1977–78

- RFL Yorkshire League:

Winners (1): 1947–48

=== Cups ===
- Challenge Cup:

Winners (5): 1943–44, 1946–47, 1948–49, 2000, 2003

- League Cup:

Winners (2): 1974–75, 1979–80

- RFL Yorkshire Cup:

Winners (11): 1940–41, 1941–42, 1943–44, 1945–46, 1948–49, 1949–50, 1953–54, 1965–66, 1978–79, 1987–88, 1989–90

=== International ===
- World Club Challenge:

Winners (3): 2002, 2004, 2006

== Records ==
=== Club Records ===
- Biggest win:

124-0 v. West Wales (at Odsal, 6 May 2018)

- Biggest loss:

6-84 v. Wigan (at DW Stadium, 21 April 2014)

- Highest Super League attendance:

24,020 v. Leeds (at Odsal, 3 September 1999)

- Most Tries: 153 Robbie Hunter-Paul
- Most Points: 2617 Paul Deacon

== See also ==
- Bradford Bulls Women
- Bradford Bulls Academy

== Bibliography ==
- Delaney, Trevor (1991). The Grounds Of Rugby League. Keighley: Trevor R. Delaney. ISBN 0-9509-9822-2.
