= Chris Atkin =

English professional rugby league footballer

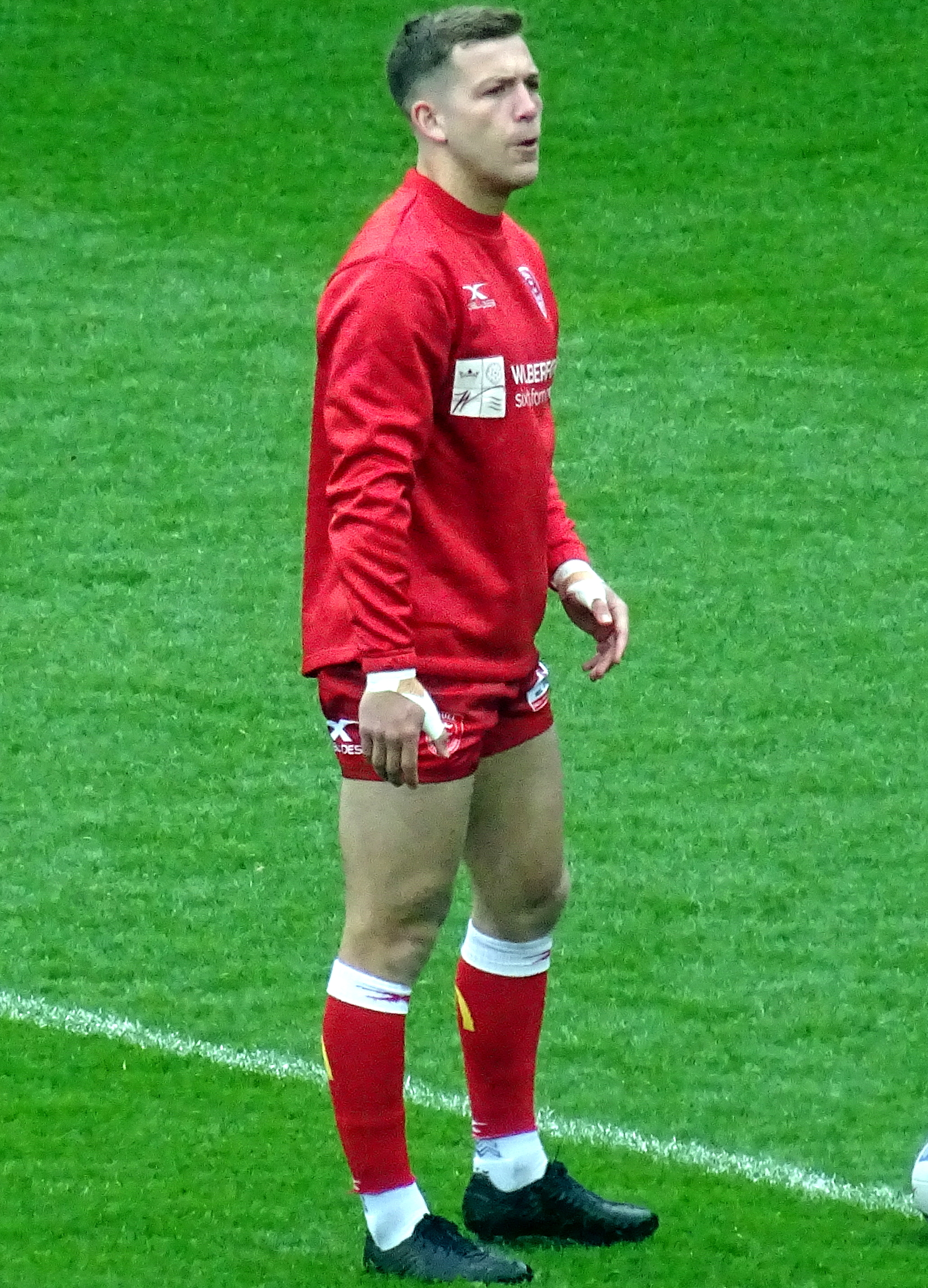

Personal information
- Full name: Christopher Atkin
- Born: 7 February 1993 (age 33) Widnes, Cheshire, England
- Height: 5 ft 8 in (1.72 m)
- Weight: 12 st 13 lb (82 kg)

Playing information
- Position: Scrum-half, Hooker, Loose forward, Fullback, Stand-off
Club
Years	Team	Pld	T	G	FG	P
2014–17	Swinton Lions	100	44	268	9	721
2017–19	Hull Kingston Rovers	66	15	5	5	75
2020–25	Salford Red Devils	110	17	4	1	77
2025–26	Castleford Tigers	19	1	10	0	24
2026	Bradford Bulls	23	3	28	0	68
	Total	318	80	315	15	965
Representative
Years	Team	Pld	T	G	FG	P
2018	England Knights	2	0	0	0	0
- Source: As of 6 November 2026

Christopher Atkin (born 7 February 1993) is an English professional rugby league footballer who plays as a scrum-half, hooker or loose forward for the Bradford Bulls in the Super League.

He has previously played for the Swinton Lions in League 1 and the Championship. Atkin also played for Hull Kingston Rovers in the Championship and the Super League, and for Salford Red Devils and Castleford Tigers in the Super League. He has represented the England Knights at international level.

== Background ==
Atkin was born in Widnes, Cheshire, England. He is a graduate of Liverpool John Moores University. Atkin is also a qualified teacher, previously teaching Physical Education at Wade Deacon High School in Widnes.

== Early career ==
Atkin was in the Widnes Vikings' Academy System and he has previously played for the England Students in the 2013 Student Rugby League World Cup. Atkin was then eventually released by the Widnes Academy System due to them already having two established young halves in Tom Gilmore and Danny Craven.

== Senior career ==
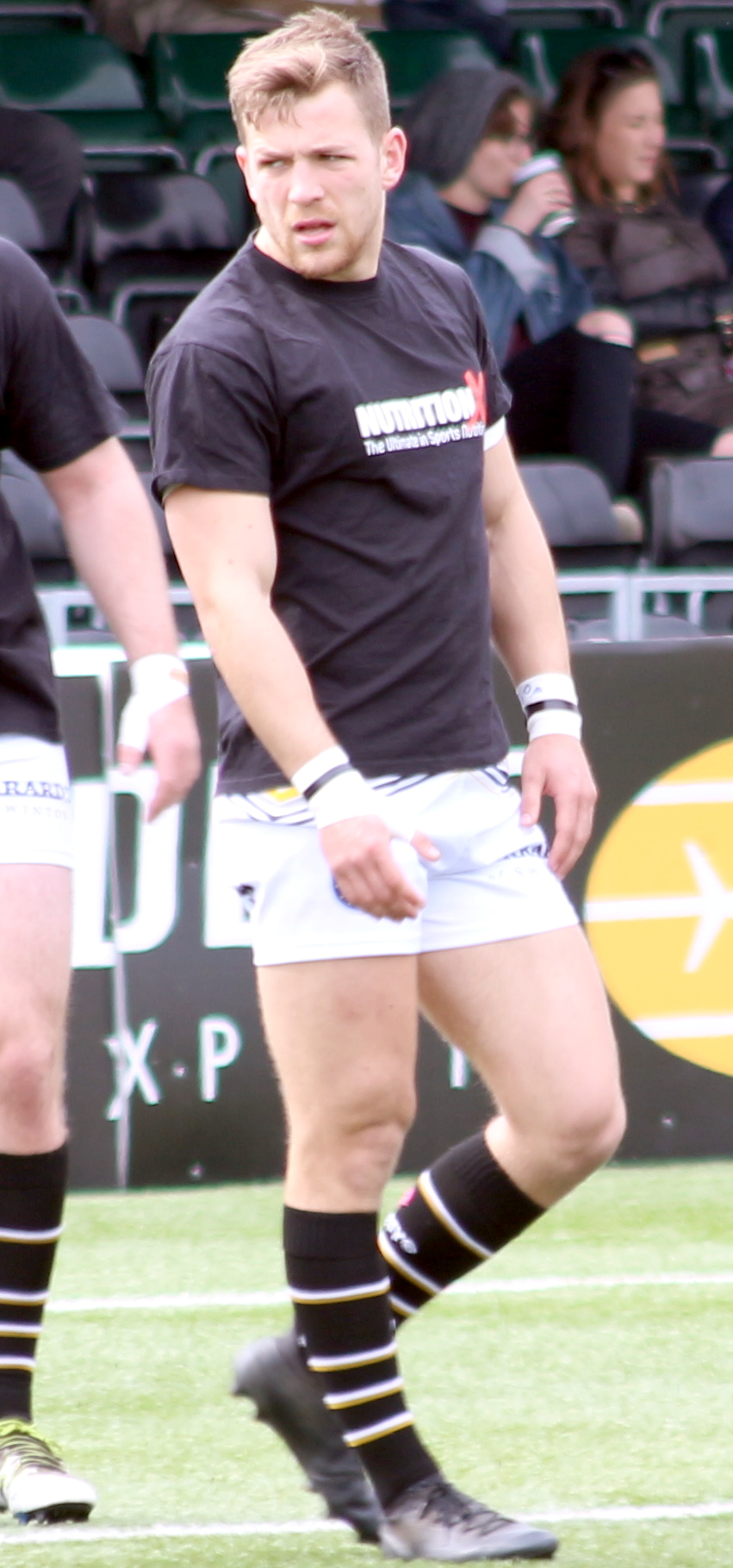
Atkin playing for the Swinton Lions in 2017

=== Swinton Lions (2014–17) ===
Between 2014 and 2017, he played for Swinton on a part-time basis under head coach John Duffy. Atkin was the hero in the Swinton's 2015 play-off semi-final victory over the York City Knights, slotting over the match-winning drop-goal in golden-point extra-time, to secure their spot in the 2015 play-off final. Once again, Atkin's impressive performance in the 2015 play-off final against the Keighley Cougars proved to be the difference at the final whistle. Swinton gained promotion to the Championship with a thrilling 29–28 victory over Keighley, with Atkin scoring a try and kicking over a drop-goal, which proved to be the deciding factor come the end of the match.

=== Hull Kingston Rovers (2017–19) ===
Atkin was originally slated to join Hull Kingston Rovers in the 2018 season, but due to financial difficulties at Swinton, Hull Kingston Rovers agreed to pay the Swinton club a five-figure transfer fee to secure Atkin's services with immediate effect during the dying stages of the 2017 season. On 23 July 2017, Atkin made his Hull Kingston Rovers début against Halifax, in a 28-6 Championship league defeat. Atkin was part of the Hull Kingston Rovers side that won promotion back to the Super League at the first time of asking following relegation the season prior.

Following an impressive start to his Hull Kingston Rovers career in the latter-stages of the 2017 Championship season, Atkin was quickly handed his Super League bow in round two against Leeds in 2018, where he won the Sky Sports 'Man-of-the-Match' Award. Atkin scored his first try for Hull Kingston Rovers on 2 April 2018, in a 44–6 Super League defeat against Wigan at the DW Stadium.

=== Salford Red Devils (2020–25) ===
In round 10 of the 2021 Super League season, Atkin kicked the winning field goal for Salford in their 9–8 victory over Huddersfield.

In the 2022 Super League season, Atkin played 20 games for Salford including their semi-final loss against St Helens.

In the 2023 Super League season, Atkin played 27 games for Salford as the club finished 7th on the table and missed the playoffs.

=== Castleford Tigers (2025–26) ===
On 29 April 2025, Atkin signed for Castleford Tigers in the Super League.

=== Bradford Bulls (2026–) ===
On 18 March 2026, Atkin signed for Bradford Bulls on a deal until the end of the season.

== Representative career ==
=== 2018 ===
It was announced by the Rugby Football League on 7 March 2018, that Atkin had been selected in the 25-man England Knights' Performance Squad, that would be touring Papua New Guinea for a two-game Test match series later in the year.

Atkin made his début for the England Knights against Papua New Guinea on 27 October 2018, the game played in Lae ended in a 12-16 victory to the Knights. He played against Papua New Guinea at the Oil Search National Football Stadium.

== Statistics ==
Appearances and points in all competitions by year
Club	Season	Tier	App	T	G	DG	Pts
Swinton Lions	2014	Championship	18	9	0	1	37
Swinton Lions	2015	Championship 1	27	21	106	2	298
Swinton Lions	2016	Championship	31	11	88	1	221
Swinton Lions	2017	Championship	24	3	74	5	165
Swinton Lions	Total		100	44	268	9	721
Hull Kingston Rovers	2017	Championship	7	0	1	2	4
Hull Kingston Rovers	2018	Super League	31	12	4	3	59
Hull Kingston Rovers	2019	Super League	28	3	0	0	12
Hull Kingston Rovers	Total		66	15	5	5	75
Salford Red Devils	2020	Super League	11	2	0	0	8
Salford Red Devils	2021	Super League	20	6	3	1	31
Salford Red Devils	2022	Super League	20	3	1	0	14
Salford Red Devils	2023	Super League	29	4	0	0	16
Salford Red Devils	2024	Super League	22	2	0	0	8
Salford Red Devils	2025	Super League	8	0	0	0	0
Salford Red Devils	Total		110	17	4	1	77
Castleford Tigers	2025	Super League	16	1	10	0	24
Castleford Tigers	2026	Super League	3	0	0	0	0
Castleford Tigers	Total		19	1	10	0	24
Bradford Bulls	2026	Super League	0	0	0	0	0
Career total			295	77	287	15	897

As of match played 21 February 2026
