= Caleb Aekins =

Wales international rugby league footballer

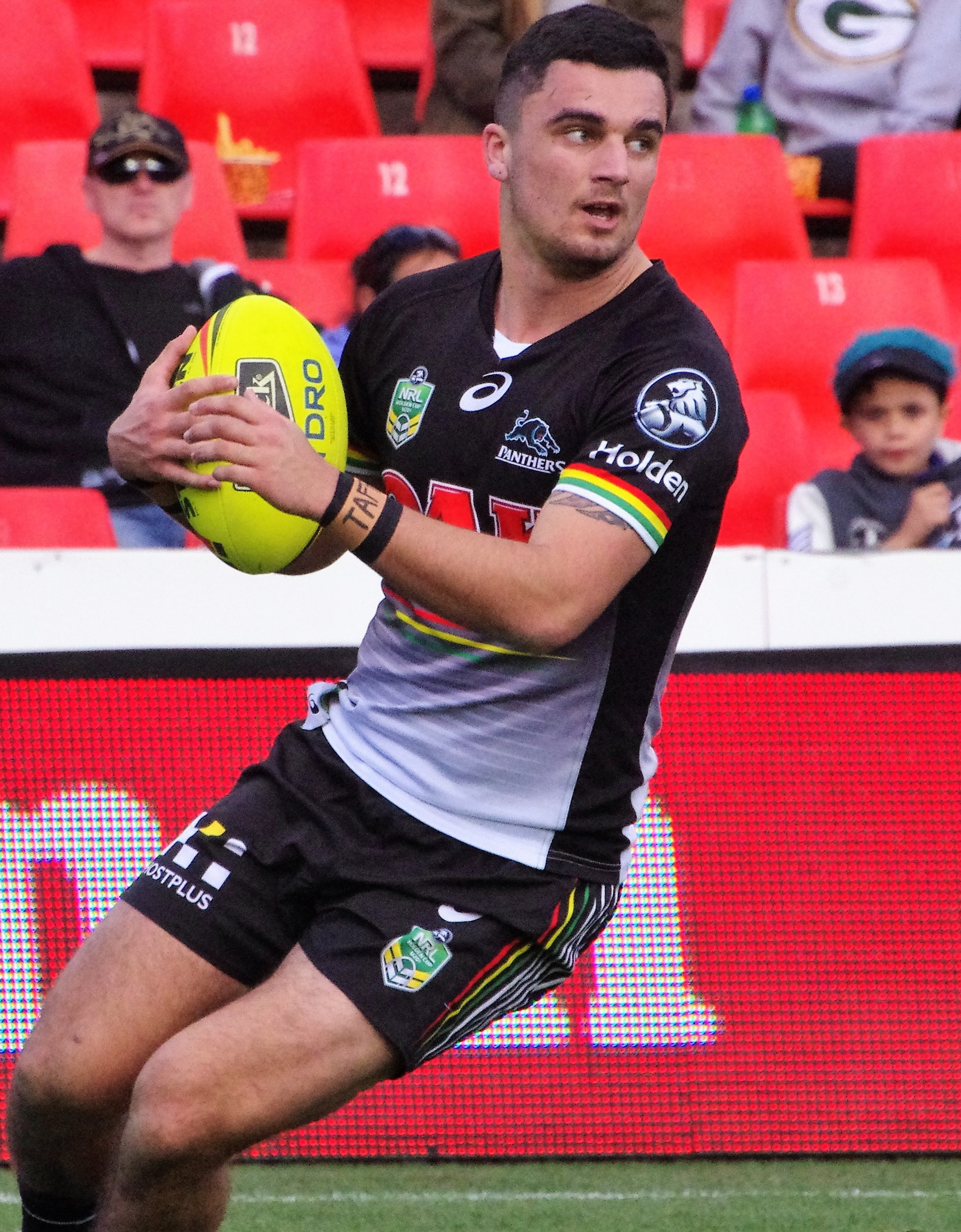

Personal information
- Born: 21 November 1997 (age 28) Hamilton, New Zealand
- Height: 6 ft 0 in (1.83 m)
- Weight: 14 st 9 lb (93 kg)

Playing information
- Position: Fullback, Stand-off
Club
Years	Team	Pld	T	G	FG	P
2018–20	Penrith Panthers	12	0	0	0	0
2021	Canberra Raiders	7	0	0	0	0
2022	Leigh Centurions	32	21	0	0	84
2023–25	Featherstone Rovers	82	44	0	0	176
2026–	Bradford Bulls	29	5	0	0	20
	Total	162	70	0	0	280
Representative
Years	Team	Pld	T	G	FG	P
2018	NSW Residents	1	0	0	0	0
2022–	Wales	3	0	0	0	0
- Source: As of 14 October 2026

Caleb Aekins (born 21 November 1997) is a Wales international professional rugby league footballer who plays as a fullback for the Bradford Bulls in the Super League.

He previously played for the Canberra Raiders and Penrith Panthers in the NRL and for the Bradford Bulls in the English Super League.

== Background ==
Aekins was born in Hamilton, New Zealand.

He played both rugby union and rugby league as a junior for the Otaika Eagles and Hikurangi Stags in rugby league and captained Whangarei Boys High School, in 2015 he moved over to Australia. Aekins is of Māori and Welsh descent.

== Playing career ==
=== Penrith Panthers ===
Aekins made his NRL debut in round 18 of the 2018 NRL season at fullback for Penrith against the Cronulla-Sutherland Sharks.

Aekins made eight appearances for Penrith in the 2020 NRL season as the club won the Minor Premiership. He did not play in the 2020 finals series or Penrith's 2020 NRL Grand Final loss to Melbourne.

=== Canberra Raiders ===
He was then released by Penrith and signed a contract to join Canberra for the 2021 season.

In round 6 of the 2021 NRL season, he made his debut for Canberra in their 35–10 loss against Parramatta. Aekins made seven appearances for Canberra in the 2021 NRL season as the club finished 10th and missed the finals.

=== Leigh Centurions ===
Following the end of the season, Aekins was released by the Canberra side and on 10 November 2021 signed for British RFL Championship side Leigh for the 2022 season. On 28 May 2022, Aekins played for Leigh in their 2022 RFL 1895 Cup final victory over Featherstone. On 3 October 2022, Aekins played for Leigh in their Million Pound Game victory over Batley which saw the club promoted back to the Super League.

=== Featherstone ===
On 29 November 2022, Aekins signed a two-year deal to join RFL Championship side Featherstone. On 5 November 2024, it was announced that Aekins had signed a two-year extension with the Rovers.

=== Bradford Bulls ===
On 10 November 2025 it was reported that he had signed for Bradford Bulls in the Super League on a 1-year deal.

== International career ==
Aekins was named in the Wales squad for the 2021 Rugby League World Cup. On 19 October 2022, he made his international debut for Wales in their 12–18 loss against the Cook Islands in the opening round of the group stages.
