= Lee Greenwood (rugby league) =

English RL coach and former professional rugby league footballer

Personal information
- Full name: Lee Greenwood
- Born: 28 September 1980 (age 45) Siddal, Halifax, West Yorkshire, England
- Height: 6 ft 0 in (1.83 m)
- Weight: 14 st 2 lb (90 kg)

Playing information
- Position: Wing, Centre
Club
Years	Team	Pld	T	G	FG	P
1999	Sheffield Eagles	2	0	0	0	0
2000–03	Halifax	43	19	0	0	76
2004–05	London Broncos	33	23	0	0	92
2005	Huddersfield Giants	7	3	0	0	12
2006	Leigh Centurions	28	24	0	0	96
2007–08	Halifax	40	27	0	0	108
2009	Oldham	21	12	0	0	48
2010	Batley Bulldogs	26	9	0	0	36
	Total	200	117	0	0	468
Representative
Years	Team	Pld	T	G	FG	P
2004	England	2	2	0	0	8

Coaching information
Club
Years	Team	Gms	W	D	L	W%
2014–17	Gloucestershire All Golds	0	0	0	0
2019–22	Dewsbury Rams	64	23	1	40	36
2023	Bradford Bulls (Caretaker)	17	10	1	6	59
	Total	81	33	2	46	41
- Source: As of 12 October 2023

Lee Greenwood (born 28 September 1980) is an English professional rugby league coach who is assistant-coach of the Bradford Bulls in the Super League and an English former professional rugby league footballer who played in the 1990s, 2000s and 2010s. He played at representative level for England, and at club level for the Sheffield Eagles, Halifax (two spells, one in the Super League, and one in National League One), the London Broncos, Huddersfield Giants, Leigh Centurions, Oldham RLFC and the Batley Bulldogs, as a wing or centre, he has coached at club level for Siddal A.R.L.F.C., and in 2014, he was appointed coach of Gloucestershire All Golds.

== Background ==
Greenwood was born in Siddal, Halifax, West Yorkshire, England.

== Playing career ==
=== International honours ===
Greenwood won two caps for England while at London Broncos, he played on the wing, and scored two tries in the 98–4 victory over Russia in the 2004 European Nations Cup at Luzhniki Stadium, Moscow on 24 October 2004, and played on the wing in the 36–12 victory over Ireland in the 2004 European Nations Cup Final at Halliwell Jones Stadium, Warrington on 7 November 2004.

== Coaching career ==
=== Bradford Bulls ===
On 28 Oct 2022 he was appointed assistant-coach at Bradford Bulls.

On 12 May 2023 he ruled himself out from becoming the permanent head-coach following the sacking of head-coach Mark Dunning
