= Guy Armitage =

English dual-code professional rugby footballer

- Born: Guy Richie Armitage; 29 November 1991 (age 34) Westminster, London, England
- Height: 6 ft 5 in (1.95 m)
- Weight: 17 st 11 lb (113 kg)
- School: Wellington College
- Notable relative(s): Delon Armitage (brother); Steffon Armitage (brother)

Rugby union career
- Position: Centre
Senior career
Years	Team	Apps	(Points)
2010–12	London Irish	8	(0)
2010	→ London Welsh	1	(0)
2011	→ London Scottish	2	(5)
2011–12	→ London Welsh	3	(0)
2012–13	Toulon	0	(0)
2012–13	→ London Irish	21	(25)
2013–15	London Irish	14	(15)
2015−16	London Welsh	29	(65)
2016−18	Wasps	11	(20)
2017	→ Jersey Reds	1	(5)
2018−19	Ealing Trailfinders	7	(20)
- Correct as of 28 April 2018
International career
Years	Team	Apps	(Points)
2011	England U20	4	(0)
- Rugby league career

Playing information
- Position: Wing, Centre, Second-row
Club
Years	Team	Pld	T	G	FG	P
2019–20	London Broncos	7	3	0	0	12
2019(loan)	→ London Skolars	1	3	0	0	12
2019(loan)	→ Doncaster RLFC	1	0	0	0	0
2021–24	Toulouse Olympique	56	41	0	0	164
2025–	Bradford Bulls	37	19	0	0	76
	Total	102	66	0	0	264
- As of 07 August 2026

Guy Richie Armitage (born 29 November 1991) is a dual code English rugby footballer who plays rugby league for the Bradford Bulls in the Super League.

He previously played for the London Broncos.

== Background ==
Armitage was born in Westminster, London, England. He is of Trinidadian descent through his mother.

== Rugby union ==
Armitage played at Brixham and earned a scholarship to Wellington College before joining the London Irish Academy. He made his debut against Sale Sharks on 5 November 2010 becoming the third Armitage brother to play for the club after Delon and Steffon. He then spent time on loan at Championship sides London Welsh and London Scottish during the 2010–11 and 2011–12 seasons, making a total of six appearances and scoring one try.

He also made eight appearances for Welsh during 2011–12 but decided to join French side Toulon at the end of the season. Less than six months after leaving, he returned to London Irish on loan for the rest of the season having not made any appearances in France. He played 21 times upon his return and in February 2013 re-signed with the club until 2015. Before returning to London Welsh in 2015. It was announced on 15 March 2016 that Armitage will join Premiership side Wasps next season.

== Rugby league ==
=== London Broncos ===
Armitage signed with the London Broncos in August 2019 following a successful trial with the club. He made his Super League debut in round 26 of the 2019 Super League season vs Catalans Dragons. In September 2020 it was announced that Armitage had signed for new Canadian club Ottawa Aces for their inaugural season in the RFL pyramid in 2021.

=== Toulouse Olympique ===
On 9 Mar 2021 it was reported that he had signed for Toulouse Olympique in the RFL Championship on loan. After a three week trial he was signed on for the 2021 season. He made a try scoring debut against Sheffield Eagles on 27 June and scored two tries on his only other appearance of the season at Bradford. On 21 October 2021 Toulouse announced that Armitage had signed a new one-year contract and would be part of the squad for 2022, their first season in Super League. On 15 October 2023, Armitage played in Toulouse Olympique's upset loss in the Million Pound Game against the London Broncos.

=== Bradford Bulls ===
On 31 October 2024 it was reported that he had signed for Bradford in the RFL Championship on a one-year deal.

== International career ==
Armitage has represented England Rugby Union at every age group and made four appearances for the under-20s in 2011.
