= Jayden Nikorima =

New Zealand rugby league player

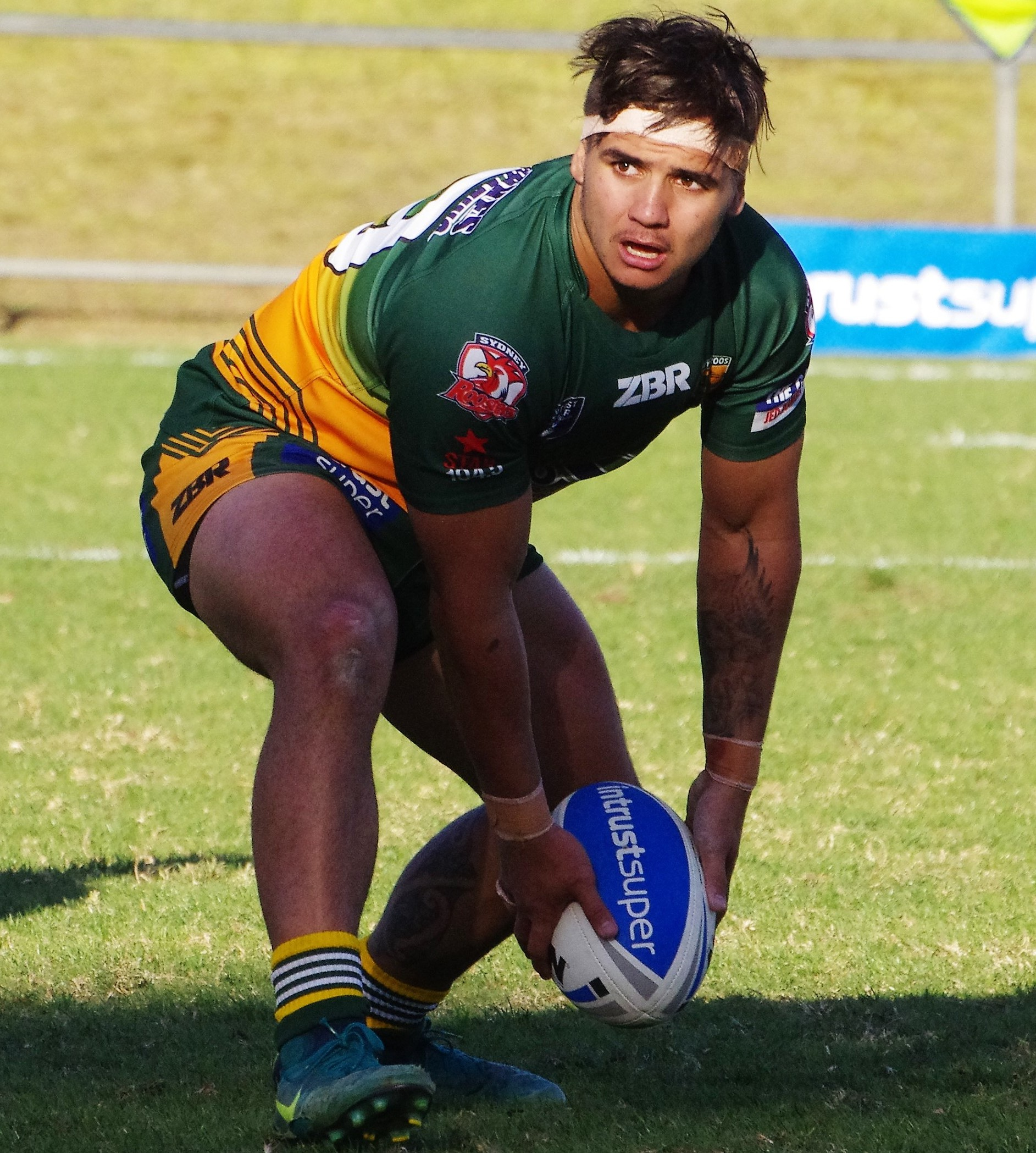

Personal information
- Born: 5 October 1996 (age 30) Palmerston North, New Zealand
- Height: 5 ft 9 in (1.74 m)
- Weight: 13 st 1 lb (83 kg)

Playing information
- Position: Stand-off, Scrum-half
Club
Years	Team	Pld	T	G	FG	P
2016–17	Sydney Roosters	7	1	0	0	4
2022–23	Melbourne Storm	2	0	0	0	0
2024	Catalans Dragons	13	2	0	0	8
2024–25	Salford Red Devils	24	8	0	0	32
2026–	Bradford Bulls	11	5	0	0	20
	Total	57	16	0	0	64
Representative
Years	Team	Pld	T	G	FG	P
2017	NSW Residents	1	0	1	0	2
2022	Māori All Stars	1	0	0	0	0
- Source: As of 27 May 2026
- Education: Wavell State High School
- Relatives: Kodi Nikorima (brother)

Jayden Nikorima (born 5 October 1996) is a New Zealand rugby league footballer who is a player stand-off for the Bradford Bulls in the Super League.

Nikorima previously played for the Sydney Roosters and Melbourne Storm in the National Rugby League (NRL).

== Background ==
Nikorima was born in Palmerston North, New Zealand. He is of Māori and Irish descent.

His older brother Kodi Nikorima is also a professional rugby league footballer, playing for the Dolphins in the NRL.

Nikorima moved to Brisbane, Queensland, Australia as a 10-year old and played his junior football for the Aspley Devils before being signed by the Brisbane Broncos. Nikorima was educated at Wavell State High School. In 2013, Nikorima played for the Queensland Under-18s and the Australian Schoolboys representative teams respectively.

== Playing career ==
=== Early career ===
In 2014 and 2015, Nikorima played for the Brisbane Broncos Holden Cup team. On 28 April 2014, Nikorima was named as 18th man for the Queensland Under-20s team. On 5 October 2014, Nikorima played for the Broncos in their 2014 Holden Cup Grand Final against the New Zealand Warriors, playing off the interchange bench, scoring a try and kicking 2 goals in the 34-32 loss. On 2 May 2015, Nikorima played for the Junior Kangaroos against the Junior Kiwis, playing off the interchange bench in the 22-20 win at Cbus Super Stadium. On 8 July 2015, Nikorima represented the Queensland Under-20s team, playing at five-eighth in the 32-16 loss to the New South Wales under-20s team at Suncorp Stadium. On 25 August 2015, it was announced that Nikorima had signed with the Sydney Roosters on a 3-year deal starting from 2016, after months of speculation as to which club Nikorima would end up at. On 14 September 2015, Nikorima was named on the interchange bench in the 2015 Holden Cup Team of the Year.

=== 2016 ===
On 6 January, Nikorima was selected in the QAS under-20s Origin squad. Nikorima made his first team debut for the Sydney Roosters in the World Club Series against match St. Helens. In Round 1 of the 2016 NRL season, Nikorima made his NRL debut against the South Sydney Rabbitohs, playing at five-eighth in the Roosters 42-10 loss at the Sydney Football Stadium. In Round 2 against the Canberra Raiders, Nikorima scored his first NRL career try in the Roosters 21-20 loss at Canberra Stadium. His season was hampered by hamstring injuries, which limited his appearances to just seven first grade games.

=== 2017 ===
In the 2017 season, he spent most of his time with Sydney Roosters feeder club, Wyong Roos.

In December 2017 Nikorima failed a second drug test and was sacked by the Sydney Roosters. The NRL handed down a 12-match suspension to Nikorima that would need to be served in 2018 before he could resume playing. NSW Police would charge Nikorima with wilfully making a false declaration for material benefit after he had asked Wyong Roos teammate Brad Keighran to sign a statutory declaration to lie about spiking his drink. Keighran was found guilty for his part in the plot, and was sentenced to six months imprisonment, but served his term by way of an intensive community corrections order. Nikorima would also avoid imprisonment, instead serving a 12-month community corrections order after being convicted and fined $5,000. It was reported that for failing the drugs test he had cost himself close to $1m when he was sacked by the Roosters.

=== 2019 ===
He was signed with Brisbane Broncos feeder club, Redcliffe Dolphins in late 2018, joining the club in 2019 to play in the Queensland Cup.

=== 2021 ===
In November 2021 he signed with Melbourne Storm for 1 year.

=== 2022 ===
On 1 February 2022, Nikorima was named to make his New Zealand Māori debut against the Indigenous All Stars.

In round 16, Nikorima made his Melbourne Storm debut against the Manly Warringah Sea Eagles after playing his last NRL match over 2,264 days ago. He had his Storm debut jersey (cap 223) presented to him by teammate Cameron Munster.

=== 2023 ===
In round 27 of the 2023 NRL season, Nikorima was called into the Melbourne side for their game against Brisbane which Melbourne would go on to win 32-22.

On 30 September 2023, it was reported that Nikorima had signed for French side Catalans Dragons on a two-year deal.

=== 2024 ===
On 12 July 2024 it was announced that Catalans Dragons had terminated his contract, along with two other players namely Sio Siua Taukeiaho and Damel Diakhate, for being "...involved in an incident deemed to be ‘highly unacceptable’ by the French club and contrary to their values...". On 18 July, he signed a deal with the Salford Red Devils to the end of the 2025 season.

=== 2025 ===
Nikorima played 15 matches for Salford in the 2025 Super League season as the club endured a horrid year on and off the field finishing bottom of the table.

On 23 October 2025 it was announced that Nikorima has signed a three-year contract with newly promoted Bradford Bulls.
