= Connor Wynne =

English professional rugby league footballer

Personal information
- Full name: Connor Wynne
- Born: 15 January 2001 (age 25) Hull, East Riding of Yorkshire, England
- Height: 5 ft 9 in (1.75 m)
- Weight: 13 st 8 lb (86 kg)

Playing information
- Position: Centre, Fullback, Wing
Club
Years	Team	Pld	T	G	FG	P
2019–23	Hull FC	36	14	0	0	56
2019(DR)	→ Doncaster RLFC	4	0	0	0	0
2021(loan)	→ York City Knights	2	1	0	0	4
2023(loan)	→ Newcastle Thunder	0	0	0	0	0
2023(loan)	→ Bradford Bulls	7	3	0	0	12
2024–25	Featherstone Rovers	41	35	0	0	84
2026–	Bradford Bulls	4	4	0	0	16
	Total	94	57	0	0	172
- Source: As of 8 November 2025

Connor Wynne (born 15 January 2001) is an English professional rugby league footballer who plays as a centre, fullback or winger for the Bradford Bulls in the Super League.

He has spent time on loan from Hull FC at Doncaster in League 1 and the York City Knights in the Championship.

== Background ==
Wynne was born in Kingston upon Hull, East Riding of Yorkshire, England.

== Playing career ==
=== Hull F.C. ===
In 2019, he made his Super League début for Hull FC against the Salford Red Devils. In round 11 of the 2022 Super League season, he scored a hat-trick in Hull F.C.'s 48-12 win over Toulouse Olympique. In May 2022, Wynne signed a contract extension until the end of the 2023 season.

=== Doncaster (loan) ===
Wynne began the 2019 season on dual-registration (DR) loan with RFL League 1 club Doncaster, picking up an ankle injury in a friendly against Newcastle Thunder.

=== York City (loan) ===
On 21 April 2021, it was reported that he had signed for the York City Knights in the RFL Championship on a short-term loan.

=== Newcastle Thunder (loan) ===
On 15 March 2023, Hull FC confirmed that Wynne had joined the club's dual-registration partner Newcastle Thunder on an indefinite loan.

=== Bradford Bulls (loan) ===
On 25 April 2023, it was reported that he had signed for the Bradford Bulls in the RFL Championship on a short-term loan.

=== Featherstone Rovers ===
On 6 November 2023 it was reported that he had signed for Featherstone Rovers in the RFL Championship. On 10 November 2024, Rovers confirmed that Wynne had signed a one-year contract extension for the 2025 season.

=== Bradford Bulls ===
On 8 November 2025 it was reported that he had signed for Bradford Bulls in the Super League on a 1-year deal.
