= Will Gardiner =

English rugby league footballer

Personal information
- Full name: William Gardiner
- Born: 21 May 2001 (age 24) Hull, East Riding of Yorkshire, England
- Height: 6 ft 4 in (1.92 m)
- Weight: 16 st 10 lb (106 kg)

Playing information
- Position: Loose forward, Prop
Club
| Years | Team | Pld | T | G | FG | P |
|---|---|---|---|---|---|---|
| 2022–25 | Hull FC | 29 | 1 | 0 | 0 | 4 |
| 2025(loan) | → Doncaster RLFC | 9 | 0 | 0 | 0 | 0 |
| 2025(loan) | → Featherstone Rovers | 1 | 0 | 0 | 0 | 0 |
| 2026– | Bradford Bulls | 0 | 0 | 0 | 0 | 0 |
| | Total | 39 | 1 | 0 | 0 | 4 |
- Source: As of 31 October 2025

Will Gardiner (born 21 May 2001) is a professional rugby league footballer who plays as a loose forward and prop for the Bradford Bulls in the Super League.

He previously played for Super League club Hull FC.

== Playing career ==
=== Hull FC ===
In 2022, he made his Hull FC début in the Super League against the Salford Red Devils.

=== Featherstone Rovers (loan) ===
On 19 March 2025 it was reported that he had signed for Featherstone Rovers in the RFL Championship on loan for the remainder of the 2025 season

=== Bradford Bulls ===
On 30 October 2025 it was reported that he had signed for Bradford Bulls in the Super League on a 2-year deal
