= Loghan Lewis =

Australian professional rugby league footballer

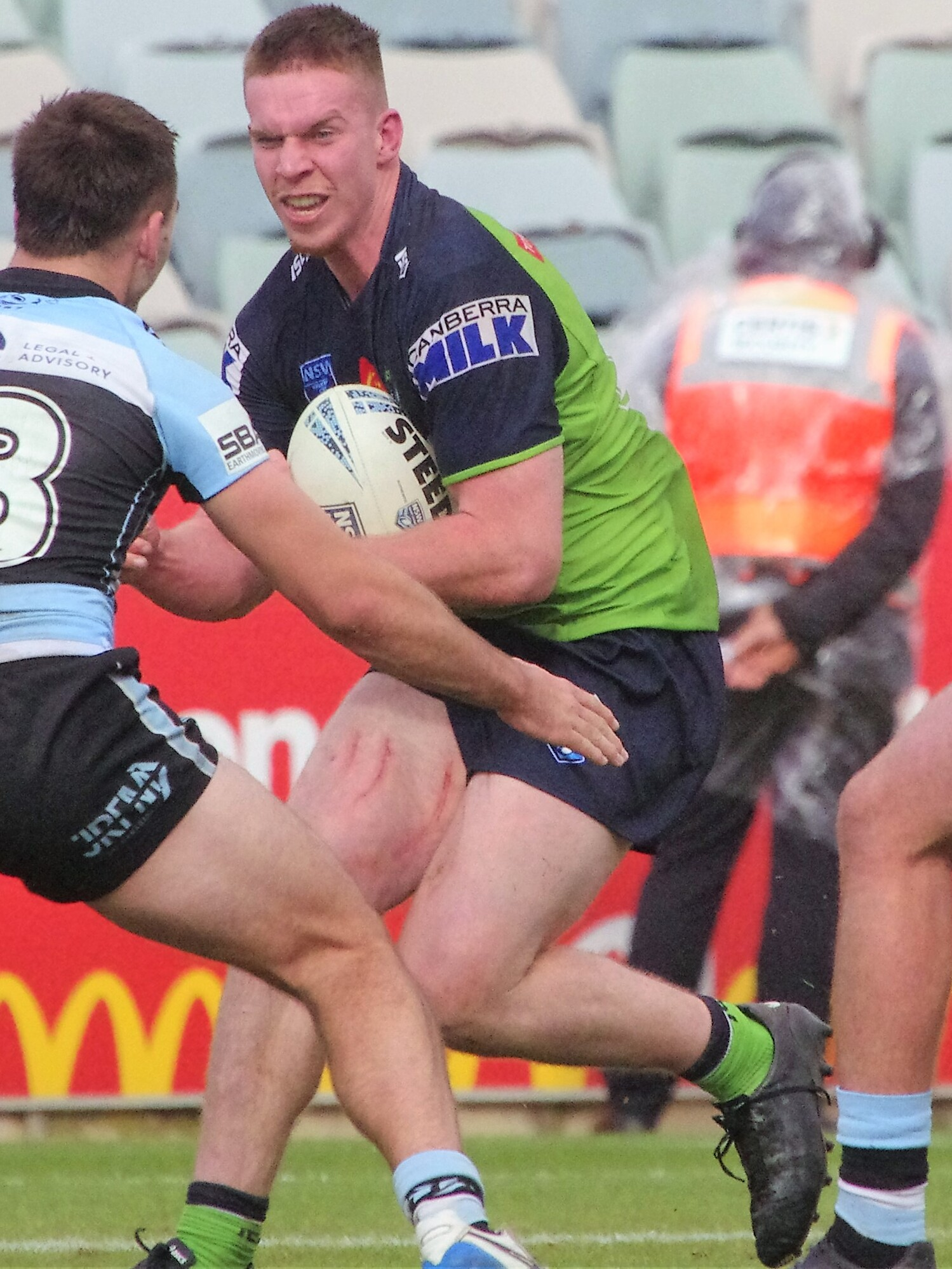

Personal information
- Full name: Loghan Lewis
- Born: 23 November 2002 (age 23) Australia
- Height: 6 ft 1 in (1.85 m)
- Weight: 15 st 4 lb (97 kg)

Playing information
- Position: Prop, Loose forward
Club
| Years | Team | Pld | T | G | FG | P |
|---|---|---|---|---|---|---|
| 2024–25 | Salford Red Devils | 18 | 0 | 0 | 0 | 0 |
| 2026– | Bradford Bulls | 16 | 0 | 0 | 0 | 0 |
| | Total | 34 | 0 | 0 | 0 | 0 |
- Source: As of 27 May 2026

Loghan Lewis (born 23 November 2002) is an Australian professional rugby league footballer who plays as a prop or loose forward for the Bradford Bulls in the Betfred Super League.

He has previously played for the Salford Red Devils in the Super League. Lewis was contracted to the Canberra Raiders in the NRL, and played for them in the NSW Cup.

== Background ==
Lewis was educated at Keebra Park State High School.

He played for the Burleigh Bears in the Mal Meninga Cup. He later progressed through the Canberra Raiders junior system, playing in their SG Ball and Jersey Flegg sides between 2021 and 2023.

== Career ==
Lewis played in the Raiders under 20s side in 2022 and 2023, winning the Jersey Flegg Coaches’ Award in 2022.

He made his Canberra reserve-grade debut against Blacktown in April 2022 in the New South Wales Cup.

Lewis was elevated to the first team squad in 2023, making his club debut in an National Rugby League pre-season trial game. He made 25 appearances in the second tier for the club from the Australian Capital Territory.

He joined the Salford Red Devils in the Super League midway through the 2024 Super League season. He initially signed in May 2024 until the end of the season, with the deal extended for a further year following the completion of the league season.

Lewis left Salford to join the Bradford Bulls on a two-year deal ahead of the 2026 Super League season.
