= Riley Dean =

Ireland international rugby league footballer

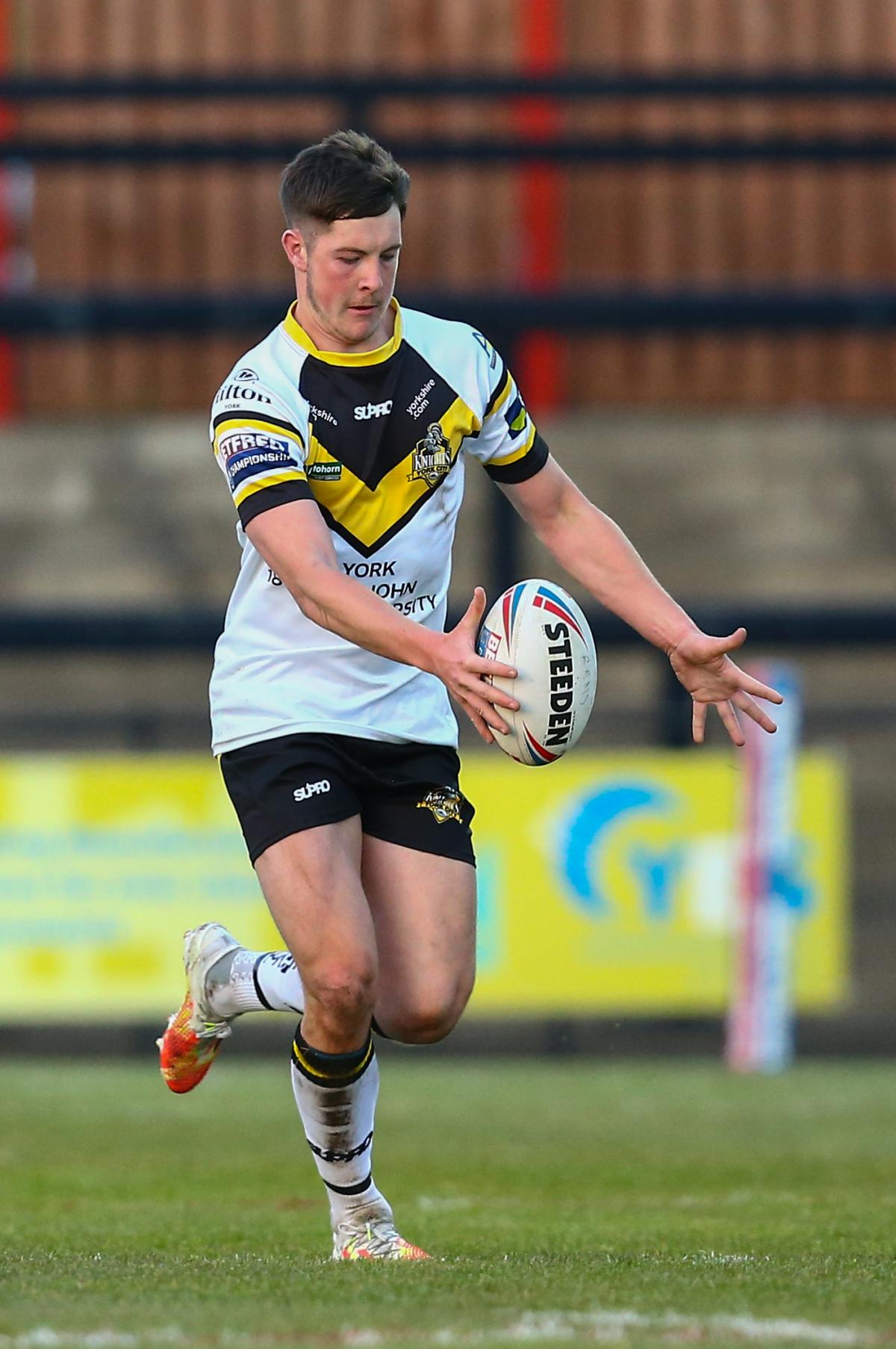
- Riley Dean playing for York Knights on loan.

Personal information
- Full name: Riley Dean
- Born: 10 August 2001 (age 25) Halifax, West Yorkshire, England
- Height: 6 ft 1 in (1.85 m)
- Weight: 13 st 5 lb (85 kg)

Playing information
- Position: Stand-off, Scrum-half
Club
Years	Team	Pld	T	G	FG	P
2019–23	Warrington Wolves	10	3	5	0	22
2021(loan)	→ York City Knights	9	3	0	1	13
2021(loan)	→ Dewsbury Rams	5	0	5	1	11
2022(loan)	→Newcastle Thunder	4	2	15	0	38
2023(loan)	→ Featherstone Rovers	11	5	23	0	66
2023(loan)	→ Castleford Tigers	4	0	2	0	4
2024	Mackay Cutters	16	4	51	0	118
2024–26	Oldham RLFC	33	13	44	0	140
2026	Bradford Bulls	12	3	10	0	32
2027–	Halifax Panthers	0	0	0	0	0
	Total	104	33	155	2	444
Representative
Years	Team	Pld	T	G	FG	P
2024	Ireland	1	0	6	0	12
- Source: As of 17 November 2026

Riley Dean (born 10 August 2001) is an Ireland international rugby league footballer who plays as a stand-off or scrum-half for the Halifax Panthers in the RFL Championship.

He has spent time on loan from Warrington at the York City Knights, Dewsbury Rams, Newcastle Thunder, and Featherstone Rovers in the Championship, and at the Castleford Tigers in the Super League. In 2024 he joins the Mackay Cutters in the Queensland Cup. They are the feeder club for the North Queensland Cowboys in the NRL.

== Club career ==
=== Warrington Wolves ===
In 2019 he made his Super League début for Warrington against St Helens.

==== York City Knights (loan) ====
On 25 February 2021 it was reported that he had signed on loan for the York City Knights in the RFL Championship.

==== Castleford Tigers (loan) ====
On 13 June 2023, the Castleford Tigers announced the signing of Dean on a season-long loan deal, with Warrington holding a two-week recall option. Head coach Andy Last believed his arrival would add balance to the team amidst several injury absences. Dean made his Castleford debut against St Helens on 30 June, kicking a 40-20. On 1 August, Warrington recalled Dean from the loan spell. In total, Dean made 4 appearances and kicked 2 goals for the Tigers.

=== Mackay Cutters ===
On 2 November 2023, it was announced Dean would leave Warrington to take up an opportunity in Australia after making only ten appearances for the club. On 23 November 2023 it was announced he had signed for the Mackay Cutters in the Queensland Cup for the 2024 season.

=== Oldham RLFC ===
On 19 Jul 2024 it was reported that he had signed for Oldham RLFC in the RFL League 1

=== Bradford Bulls ===
On 20 May 2026 it was reported that he had signed for Bradford Bulls in the Super League in a deal until the end of the 2026 season

=== Halifax Panthers ===
On 22 September 2026 it was reported that he had signed for Halifax Panthers in the RFL Championship

== International ==
On 16 April 2020 it was announced that Dean had been called up to the Ireland squad for the upcoming 2021 Rugby League World Cup qualifiers. Captained the first ever Ireland RL U16 team.

He eventually made his debut for Ireland in the win over Scotland in October 2024, scoring 6/7 goals.
