= Andy Ackers =

England international rugby league footballer

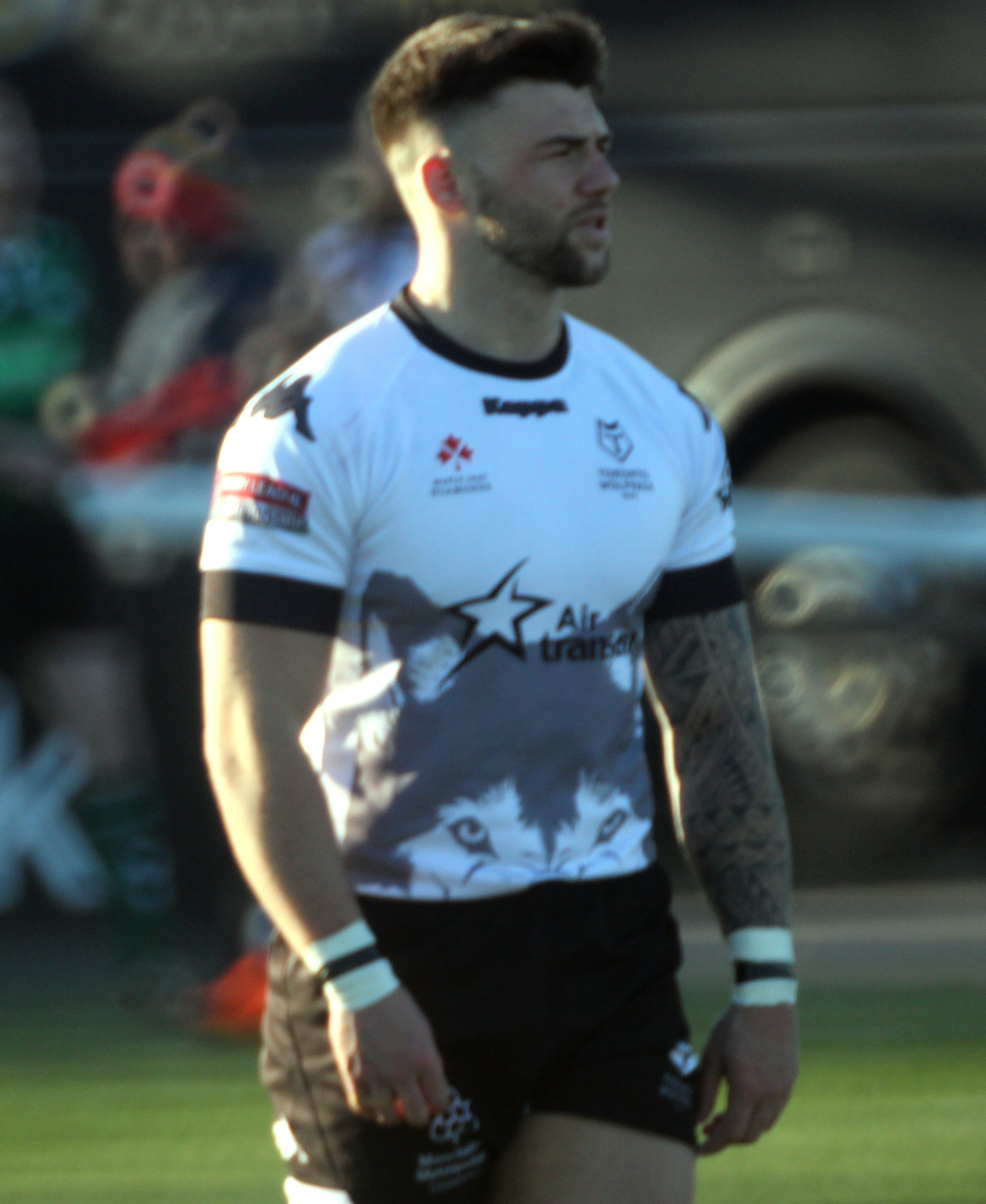

Personal information
- Full name: Andrew Ackers
- Born: 25 December 1993 (age 32) Golborne, Greater Manchester, England
- Height: 5 ft 10 in (1.78 m)
- Weight: 14 st 2 lb (90 kg)

Playing information
- Position: Hooker
Club
Years	Team	Pld	T	G	FG	P
2014–15	Swinton Lions	56	26	0	0	104
2016–17	London Broncos	48	20	0	0	80
2018–20	Toronto Wolfpack	66	28	0	0	112
2020–23	Salford Red Devils	74	10	0	0	40
2024–25	Leeds Rhinos	36	1	0	0	4
2026–	Bradford Bulls	5	3	0	0	12
	Total	285	88	0	0	352
Representative
Years	Team	Pld	T	G	FG	P
2022	England	2	2	0	0	8
- Source: As of 13 October 2025

Andrew Ackers (born 25 December 1993) is an English professional rugby league footballer who plays as a hooker for the Bradford Bulls in the Super League and has played for England at the international level.

He has previously played for the Swinton Lions in the Championship and Championship 1, the London Broncos in the Championship, and the Toronto Wolfpack in the Championship and the Super League.

== Background ==
Ackers was born in Golborne, Wigan, Greater Manchester, England. He started playing rugby league at the age of 12 for Golborne Parkside before signing for Hindley.

== Playing career ==
=== Early career ===
Ackers was recruited into the Wigan Warriors Academy at the age of 18. He played for the under-18s during the 2012 season but was released without making a single first-team appearance. Ackers then signed with Warrington after a successful trial and captained their under-19s team in 2013.

In the 2014 season, Ackers joined Championship side Swinton Lions on loan before signing a permanent deal with the club a year later. Over a two-year period, he scored 26 tries in 56 games.

=== London Broncos ===
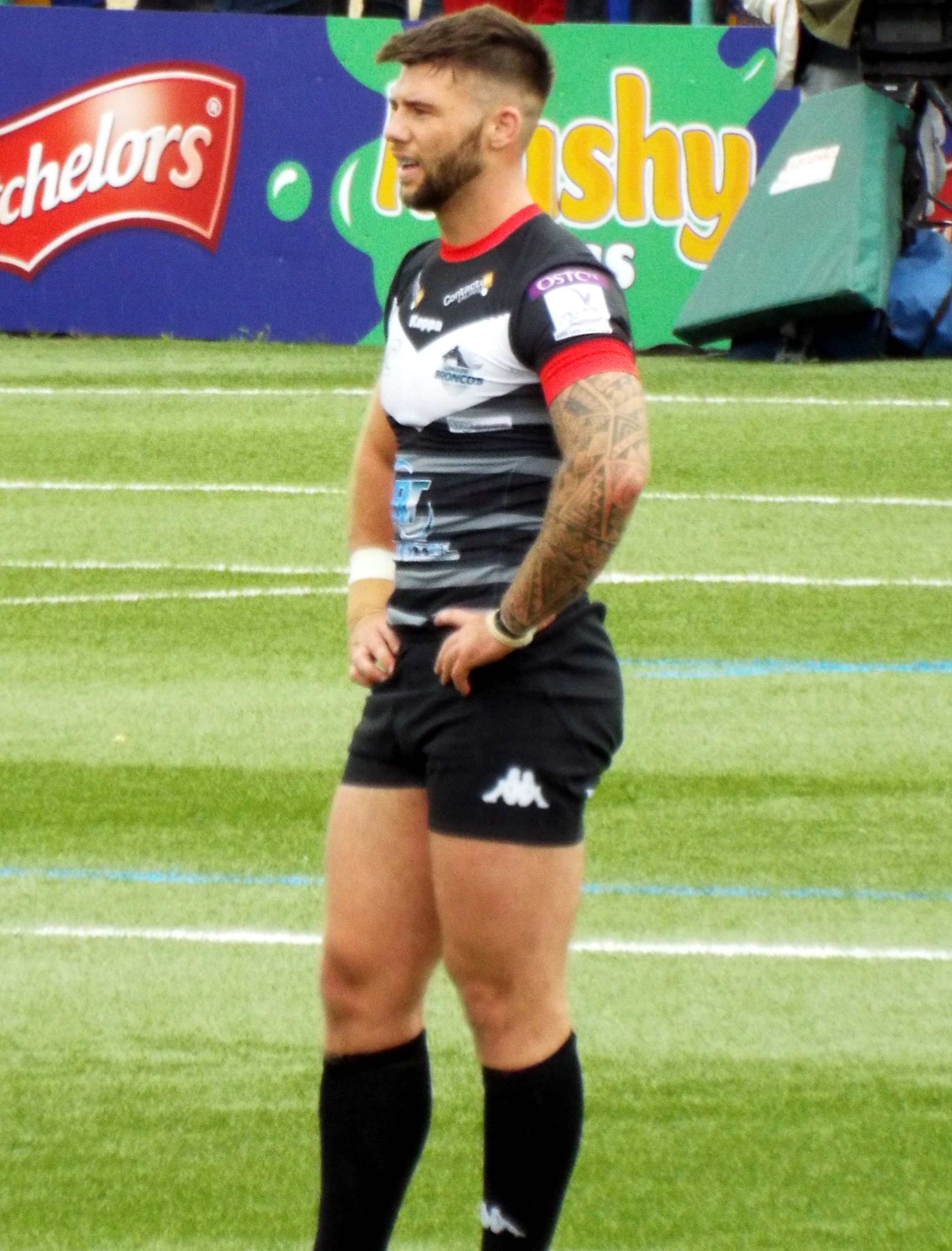
Ackers playing for the London Broncos in 2016

Ackers became a full time professional as a 23-year-old at the London Broncos signing for the 2016 and 2017.

It was announced on 9 May 2016, that Ackers extended his contract to the end of the 2018 season. The London Broncos finished 2nd in both 2016 and 2017, thus he played in the Qualifiers Super 8's for a place in Super League.

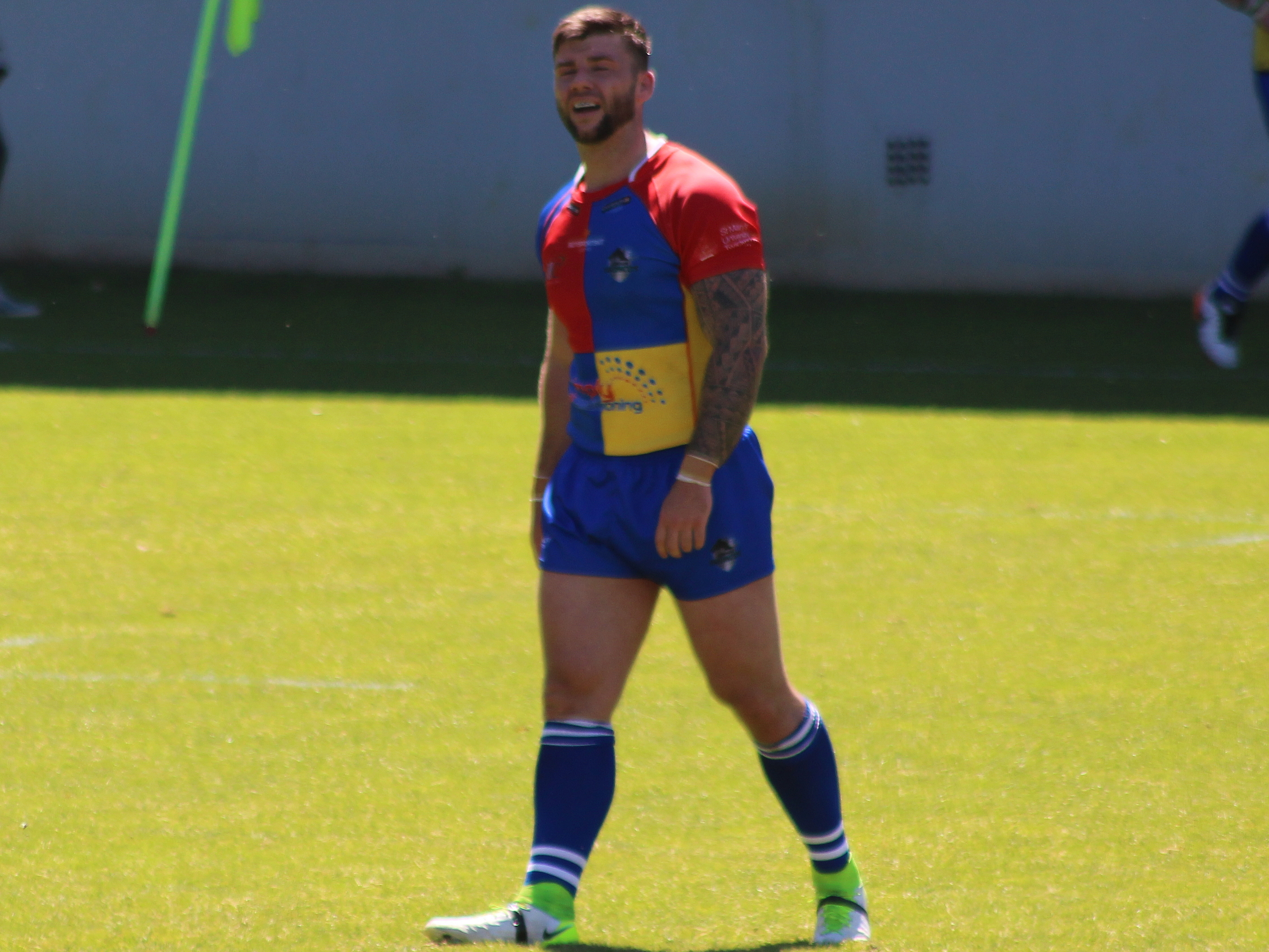
Ackers playing for the London Broncos away at Toulouse in 2017

Ackers last game for London was an away game against Widnes Vikings in the Qualifiers on 16 September 2017. Shortly after, he left the club after the Broncos accepted his request to be released for family reasons.

=== Toronto Wolfpack ===
Ackers signed for Canadian-based club Toronto Wolfpack a few days after his release. The move was criticised by London Broncos, as Ackers had initially requested his release in order to spend more time with his family in the north of England. In both seasons in the Championship his team made the finals stages. His first season saw his club beaten by 4 points at 2 in the Million Pound Game with Ackers sinbinned in the final for a high tackle.

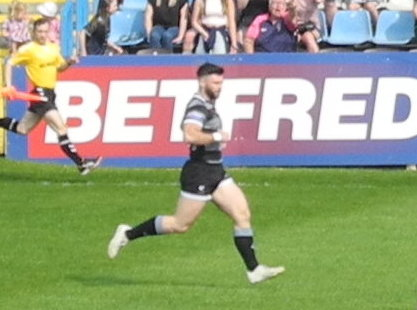
Ackers playing for the Toronto Wolfpack away at the LD Nutrition Stadium in 2019

His second season saw his club beat part-time Featherstone to be promoted. His third season saw Toronto lose all their Super League games and become hot favourites for relegation. Ackers suddenly left in June 2020; a few weeks before the events at Toronto that would see them ultimately liquidated.

=== Salford ===
On 4 June 2020, Ackers left Toronto and signed a contract with Salford that would run until 2022. Following an impressive start to the 2022 season it was announced Ackers had signed one-year contract extension with Salford Red Devils which would keep him at the AJ Bell Stadium until the end of the 2023 season. In the 2023 Super League season, Ackers played 20 matches for Salford as the club finished 7th on the table and missed the playoffs.

=== Leeds ===
On 18 October 2023, Ackers signed a three-year deal to join Leeds ahead of the 2024 Super League season. In round 1 of the 2024 Super League season, Ackers made his club debut for Leeds against his former team Salford. Leeds would win the match 22-16. Ackers played 24 games for Leeds in the 2024 Super League which saw the club finish 8th on the table. Ackers was limited to just nine appearances for Leeds in the 2025 Super League season as the club finished 4th on the table and qualified for the playoffs.

=== Bradford Bulls ===
On 13 October 2025 it was reported that he had joined Bradford Bulls for 2026 on a 2-year deal

=== England ===
Following an outstanding season with Salford, Ackers was announced as part of Shaun Wane's England World Cup squad on 30 September 2022. In the third group stage match at the 2021 Rugby League World Cup, Ackers scored two tries for England in a 94–4 victory over minnows Greece.
