= Jack Ormondroyd =

English rugby league footballer

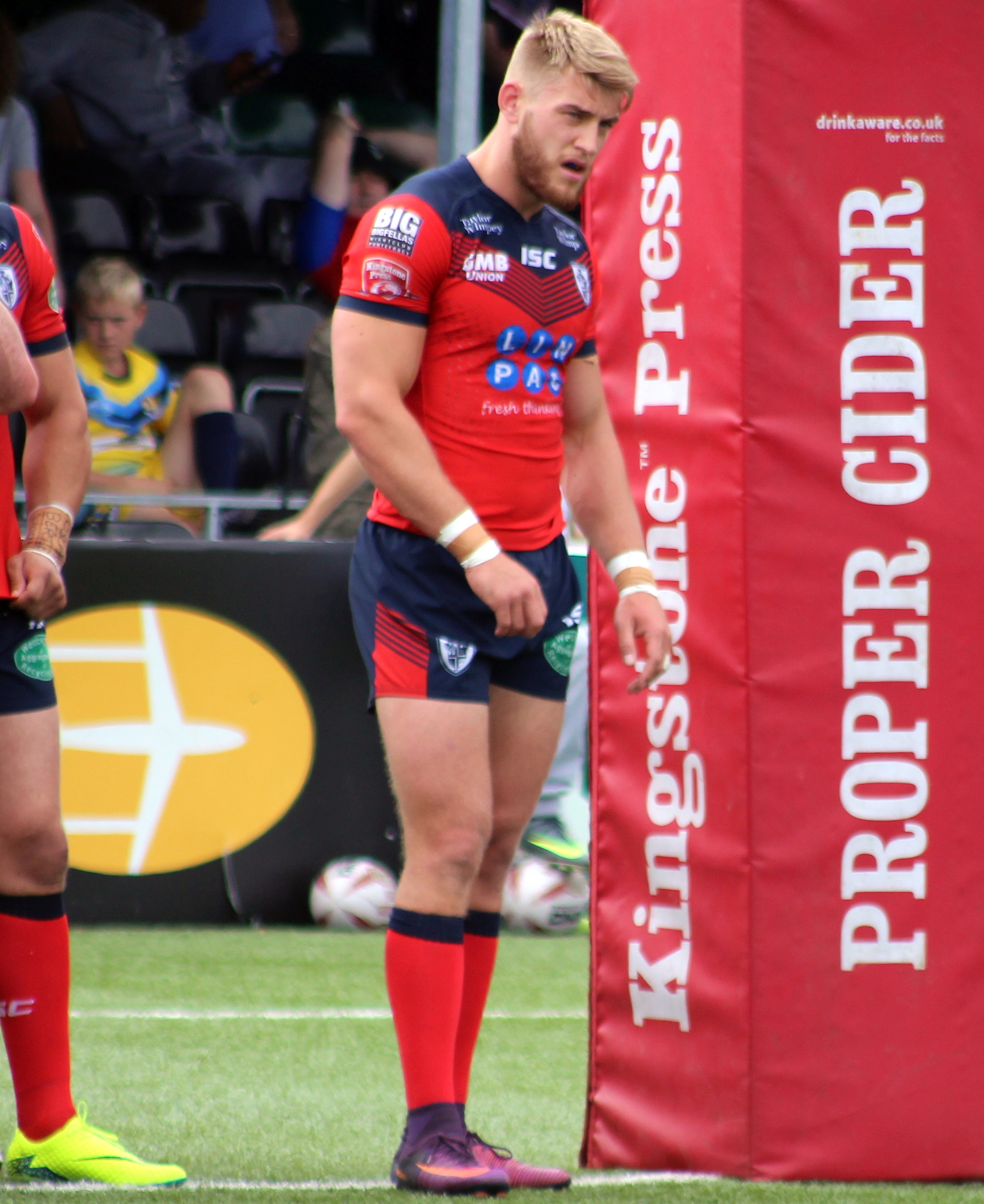

Personal information
- Born: 7 November 1991 (age 34) Birmingham, West Midlands, England
- Height: 6 ft 4 in (1.93 m)
- Weight: 16 st 7 lb (105 kg)

Playing information
- Position: Prop
Club
Years	Team	Pld	T	G	FG	P
2015–16	Featherstone Rovers	51	12	0	0	48
2017–18	Leeds Rhinos	14	0	0	0	0
2017(loan)	→ Featherstone Rovers	16	3	0	0	12
2018(loan)	→ Featherstone Rovers	8	2	0	0	8
2018(loan)	→ York City Knights	7	2	0	0	8
2019	Featherstone Rovers	28	3	0	0	12
2020–25	Salford Red Devils	110	7	0	0	28
2025–26	Oldham	13	1	0	0	4
2026(loan)	→ Bradford Bulls	9	0	0	0	0
2027–	Bradford Bulls	0	0	0	0	0
	Total	256	30	0	0	120
- Source: As of 11 September 2026

Jack Ormondroyd (born 7 November 1991) is a professional rugby league footballer who plays as a prop for the Bradford Bulls in the Betfred Super League.

He played for Featherstone Rovers in two separate spells in the Championship. Ormondroyd played for the Leeds Rhinos in the Super League, and on loan from Leeds at Featherstone in the Championship and the York City Knights in League 1.

== Background ==
Ormondroyd was born in Birmingham, England. He is the son of English former professional footballer Ian Ormondroyd.

== Career ==
Ormondroyd played in Australia for the Thirlmere Roosters in Group 6 Country Rugby League.

=== Featherstone Rovers ===
Ormondroyd then played for Featherstone Rovers in the Championship.

Ormondroyd played seven games for Leeds in the 2017 Super League season but did not feature in the clubs playoffs campaign or their grand final victory over Castleford. In the 2019 RFL Championship season, Ormondroyd played 29 games for Featherstone including their Million Pound Game loss against Toronto. In 2020, Ormondroyd joined Salford. In the 2022 Super League season, he played 26 games including the clubs semi-final loss against St Helens. In the 2023 Super League season, he played 24 matches for Salford as the club finished 7th on the table and missed the playoffs. In the 2024 Super League season, Ormondroyd managed only 13 appearances for the year with Salford.

=== Oldham RLFC ===
On 7 August 2025 it was reported that he had signed for Oldham RLFC in the RFL Championship on a 2½-year deal.

=== Bradford Bulls (loan) ===
On 19 March 2026 it was reported that he had signed for Bradford Bulls on season-long loan

=== Bradford Bulls ===
On 11 September 2026 it was reported that he had signed a permanent deal with Bradford Bulls in the Super League
