= 2023 Bradford Bulls season =

- Championship Rank: 3rd
- Play-off result: Semi Final
- Challenge Cup: 5th Round
- 2023 record: Wins: 19; draws: 1; losses: 12
- Points scored: For: 773; against: 656

Team information
- Chairman: Nigel Wood
- Head Coach: Lee Greenwood (was Mark Dunning)
- Captain: Michael Lawrence
- Stadium: Odsal Stadium
- Avg. attendance: 3,340
- High attendance: 4,879 vs. Keighley Cougars

Top scorers
- Tries: Kieran Gill (21)
- Goals: Dec Patton (79)
- Points: Dec Patton (166)
← 2022	List of seasons	2024 →

This article details the Bradford Bulls rugby league football club's 2023 season. This is the Bulls' fifth consecutive season in the Championship.

== Season review ==
=== July 2022 ===
Loose forward Ben Evans signed a two-year deal with Barrow Raiders for next season. Prop Daniel Fleming left the Bulls to join promotion chasing Featherstone Rovers.

=== August 2022 ===
On loan second row forward Chester Butler became the first signing of the 2023 season as it was announced that he would leave the Huddersfield Giants to sign a two-year deal at the Bulls. The second signing of the season came in the form of experienced RFL Championship winger Ben Blackmore from Dewsbury Rams on a one-year deal. Halfback Tom Holmes from Featherstone Rovers became the third signing for the 2023 season.

=== September 2022 ===
Second row Brad England signed a one-year extension to his contract to keep him at the club for the 2023 season. The Bulls signed prop/loose forward Brad Foster on a one-year deal from fellow RFL Championship side London Broncos. Club captain Steve Crossley announced that he would leave the club at the end of his contract and would eventually sign for RFL League 1 side Hunslet R.L.F.C. Veteran second rower Aaron Murphy signed a contract with Sheffield Eagles for the 2023 season. Young hooker Thomas Doyle signed a two-year contract with RFL League 1 champions and recently promoted Keighley Cougars whilst veteran hooker George Flanagan signed a new 1 year extension to stay at the Bulls. Winger David Foggin-Johnston signed an extension to his contract keeping him at the club for the 2023 season. Joe Burton became the latest member of the squad to leave as he signed up with RFL League 1 side Hunslet R.L.F.C. Championship second-row stalwart Sam Scott signed a one-year extension with the club following an injury ravaged season.

=== October 2022 ===
Prop forward Anthony Walker joined former coach John Kear as he signed a deal to play for Widnes Vikings for 2023. Winger Matty Dawson-Jones signed a two-year deal with fellow RFL Championship side Sheffield Eagles. The Bulls announced a shock signing in the form of 2017 Super League Grand Final winner Jack Walker on a one year permanent contract from Leeds Rhinos. Bradford also announced the signing of prop forward Dalton Desmond-Walker from 2022 RFL League 1 winner Keighley Cougars. The Bulls recruitment continued with the signing of seasoned professional Bodene Thompson, the New Zealand born second rower joined from local rivals Leeds Rhinos on a one-year deal. Prop forward Michael Hoyle signed a one-year extension to keep him at the club, meanwhile Elliot Kear joined Batley Bulldogs for the 2023 season. Former Dewsbury Rams coach Lee Greenwood joined the club as Mark Dunning's assistant coach for the upcoming season. Loose forward Sam Hallas joined Australian side Kurri Kurri Bulldogs for the 2023 season.

=== November 2022 ===
Bradford's recruitment continued with the signing of centre Max Clarke on a short-term deal from Hull F.C. Welsh centre Rhys Evans announced his retirement from rugby league. After spending much of 2022 on loan, fullback Elliot Hall signed for Doncaster R.L.F.C. on a permanent deal. The 2023 fixtures were released and it was revealed that the Bulls would host Whitehaven R.L.F.C. in the opening game and would face local rivals Keighley Cougars in this seasons Summer Bash. The Bulls announced the signing of two young players on a season long loan from Huddersfield Giants, the first being hooker George Roby and also prop Fenton Rodgers. Huddersfield Giants prop forward Michael Lawrence joined the Bulls on a two-year deal. Prop Samy Kibula departed the club and joined Batley Bulldogs for the 2023 season. Winger Ryan Millar left the club by mutual consent and he eventually joined Widnes Vikings. The Bulls signed Papua New Guinea second-row international Keven Appo after impressing at the 2021 Rugby League World Cup.

=== December 2022 ===
The Bulls announced that they would face Huddersfield Giants in a pre-season friendly on 22 January 2023 at Odsal Stadium and also will play Dewsbury Rams at Crown Flatt on 15 January 2023. The final friendly was announced as the Bulls will face Leeds Rhinos on the 29 January 2023 at Headingley Stadium in a new annual fixture for the Keith Howard Foundation trophy. Coach Dunning revealed that prop forward Michael Lawrence would be the captain for the 2023 season while Bodene Thompson would be the vice captain. It was announced that emerging young talent George Flanagan Jr would sign for Huddersfield Giants at the end of 2023 for the 2024 season for a fee of around £85,000. New prop forward Dalton Desmond-Walker announced his shock departure via social media after spending only two months with the club.

=== January 2023 ===
To start the new year off the Bulls announced the signing of centre Joe Arundel following his departure from Halifax Panthers. The 2023 squad numbers were revealed with notable numbers being taken, fullback Jack Walker took the number 31 shirt (the one he debuted with for Leeds Rhinos) rather than the traditional number 1. Captain Michael Lawrence will wear the number 10 shirt whilst George Flanagan would wear the number 9. Second rower Sam Scott announced he was retiring immediately after failing to overcome a recurring injury. Bradford started their pre-season with a convincing 34-16 win over Dewsbury Rams, new signings Brad Foster, Joe Arundel and Jack Walker all crossed for tries whilst young half Myles Lawford kicked five goals as well as scoring a try himself. The scheduled friendly against Huddersfield Giants was cancelled due to a frozen pitch. After the departure of Desmond-Walker and the retirement of Scott, Bradford bolstered their pack by signing experienced forward Josh Johnson from Widnes Vikings. The Bulls finished pre-season with a 24-10 loss to local rivals Leeds Rhinos.

=== February 2023 ===
The Bulls began the 2023 RFL Championship season with a comfortable 24-8 win over Whitehaven R.L.F.C., last years top try scorer Kieran Gill got off the mark with two tries whilst Chester Butler and George Flanagan both scored tries. Following the positive start to the season, the Bulls were brought back down to earth with a 32-16 loss to York Knights, winger David Foggin-Johnston, Jordan Lilley and vice captain Bodene Thompson all scored however it was not enough to prevent the Bulls first defeat of the season. Prop forward Masi Matongo was announced as the latest signing for the Bulls following a successful trial period from York Knights.

== Milestones ==
- Round 1: Tom Holmes, Ben Blackmore, Michael Lawrence, Bodene Thompson, Brad Foster, Fenton Rogers and Jack Walker made their debuts for the Bulls.
- Round 2: George Roby made his debut for the Bulls.
- Round 2: Bodene Thompson scored his 1st try for the Bulls.
- Round 3: Keven Appo made his debut for the Bulls.
- Round 3: Ben Blackmore and Tom Holmes scored their 1st try for the Bulls.
- Round 4: Josh Johnson made his debut for the Bulls.
- Round 4: Dec Patton reached 200 points for the Bulls.
- CCR3: Jayden Myers made his debut for the Bulls.
- CCR3: Keiran Gill scored his 2nd hat-trick for the Bulls.
- CCR3: Keven Appo, Brad Foster and Jayden Myers scored their 1st try for the Bulls.
- CCR3: Dec Patton kicked his 100th goal for the Bulls.
- CCR3: George Flanagan Jr kicked his 1st goal for the Bulls.
- Round 6: Leon Ruan made his debut for the Bulls.
- Round 7: Luis Roberts made his debut for the Bulls.
- CCR4: David Foggin-Johnston made his 50th appearance for the Bulls.
- CCR4: Jansin Turgut made his debut for the Bulls.
- CCR4: Chester Butler scored his 1st hat-trick for the Bulls.
- CCR4: Billy Jowitt and Fenton Rogers scored their 1st try for the Bulls.
- CCR4: Myles Lawford kicked his 1st goal for the Bulls.
- Round 8: Jack Bibby made his debut for the Bulls.
- Round 8: Keiran Gill scored his 25th try and reached 100 points for the Bulls.
- Round 8: Sam Walters scored his 1st try for the Bulls.
- Round 9: Rob Butler made his debut for the Bulls.
- Round 9: Jordan Lilley made his 100th appearance for the Bulls.
- CCR5: Jason Qareqare made his debut for the Bulls.
- Round 10: Luis Roberts and Jack Walker scored their 1st try for the Bulls.
- Round 11: Nathan Mason made his debut for the Bulls.
- Round 11: Nathan Mason scored his 1st try for the Bulls.
- Round 12: Ebon Scurr made his 50th appearance for the Bulls.
- Round 13: David Foggin-Johnston scored his 25th try and reached 100 points for the Bulls.
- Round 14: James Segeyaro made his debut for the Bulls.
- Round 15: Dec Patton reached 300 points for the Bulls.
- Round 17: Connor Wynne and Jorge Taufua made their debut for the Bulls.
- Round 17: Keiran Gill scored his 3rd hat-trick for the Bulls.
- Round 17: Jorge Taufua scored his 1st try and 1st hat-trick for the Bulls.
- Round 17: Connor Wynne scored his 1st try for the Bulls.
- Round 18: Jason Baitieri made his debut for the Bulls.
- Round 19: Daniel Okoro made his debut for the Bulls.
- Round 19: Kieran Gill made his 50th appearance for the Bulls.
- Round 19: James Segeyaro and Masi Matongo scored their 1st try for the Bulls.
- Round 21: Michael Lawrence scored his 1st try for the Bulls.
- Round 22: Eribe Doro made his debut for the Bulls.
- Round 23: Jordan Lilley reached 200 points for the Bulls.
- Elimination Playoff: George Flanagan made his 100th appearance for the Bulls.

== Pre-season friendlies ==
LEGEND
Win
Draw
Loss

Date	Competition	Vrs	H/A	Venue	Result	Score	Tries	Goals	Att	Report
15 January 2023	Pre Season	Dewsbury Rams	A	Crown Flatt	W	34-16	Arundel, Foster, Gill, Lawford, Lilley, Walker	Lawford 5/6	Att	Report
22 January 2023	Pre Season	Huddersfield Giants	H	Odsal Stadium	N/A	P-P	-	-	-	Report
29 January 2023	Pre Season	Leeds Rhinos	A	Headingley Stadium	L	10-24	Arundel, Flanagan	Patton 0/1, Flanagan Jr 1/1	4,400	Report

=== Player appearances ===
- Friendly games only

FB=Fullback	C=Centre	W=Winger	SO=Stand Off	SH=Scrum half	P=Prop	H=Hooker	SR=Second Row	LF=Loose forward	B=Bench

No	Player	1	2	3
1	Tom Holmes	SO	x	SO
2	Ben Blackmore	W	x	W
3	Joe Arundel	B	x	C
4	Keiran Gill	C	x	C
5	David Foggin-Johnston	W	x	W
6	Dec Patton	Red card	x	SH
7	Jordan Lilley	H	x	H
8	Jordan Baldwinson		x	
9	George Flanagan	x	x	B
10	Michael Lawrence		x	
11	Brad England	SR	x	x
12	Chester Butler	L	x	L
13	Bodene Thompson	x	x	SR
14	Ebon Scurr	Red card	x	Red card
15	Ajahni Wallace	SR	x	SR
16	Brad Foster	P	x	P
17	Josh Johnson	x	x	B
18	Keven Appo	x	x	x
19	Max Clarke	B	x	B
20	Billy Jowitt	x	x	x
21	Fenton Rogers	P	x	P
22	George Roby	x	x	B
25	Myles Lawford	SH	x	B
26	George Flanagan Jr	B	x	B
30	Jayden Myers	C	x	B
31	Jack Walker	FB	x	FB
32	Marcus Green	B	x	B
33	Bradley Ho	x	x	x
34	Michael Hoyle	B	x	x
n/a	Will Adams	B	x	x
n/a	Bailey Arnold	B	x	x
n/a	Jaden Barraclough	B	x	B
n/a	Lewis Camden	B	x	x
n/a	Kian Fisher	B	x	x
n/a	Harry Gray	B	x	x
n/a	Aiden Scully	B	x	x

= Injured

= Suspended

== Table ==
Pos	Team	Pld	W	D	L	PF	PA	PD	Pts	Qualification
1	Featherstone Rovers	27	25	0	2	1079	295	+784	50	League Leaders Shield and qualify for semi-finals
2	Toulouse Olympique	27	19	0	8	834	385	+449	38	Semi-finals
3	Bradford Bulls	27	16	1	10	677	572	+105	33	Eliminators
4	Sheffield Eagles	27	16	0	11	780	560	+220	32	Eliminators
5	London Broncos	27	16	0	11	600	552	+48	32	Eliminators
6	York Knights	27	15	0	12	557	557	0	30	Eliminators
7	Batley Bulldogs	27	15	0	12	506	519	−13	30	
8	Halifax Panthers	27	14	1	12	690	572	+118	29	
9	Widnes Vikings	27	13	0	14	619	654	−35	26	
10	Swinton Lions	27	9	0	18	426	739	−313	18	
11	Barrow Raiders	27	8	1	18	471	672	−201	17	
12	Whitehaven	27	8	0	19	481	809	−328	16	
13	Keighley Cougars	27	8	0	19	506	837	−331	16	Relegation to League One
14	Newcastle Thunder	27	5	1	21	415	918	−503	11	Relegation to League One

Source: RFL
Rules for classification: 1) Competition points; 2) Points difference; 3) Points percentage (points scored/points conceded x 100)

== RFL Championship ==
LEGEND
Win
Draw
Loss
Postponed

2023 Championship

Date	Competition	Rnd	Vrs	H/A	Venue	Result	Score	Tries	Goals	Att	Live on TV	Report
5 February 2023	Championship	1	Whitehaven R.L.F.C.	H	Odsal Stadium	W	24-8	Gill (2), Butler, Flanagan	Patton 4/4	4,870	-	Report
13 February 2023	Championship	2	York Knights	A	York Community Stadium	L	16-32	Foggin-Johnston, Lilley, Thompson	Patton 2/3	2,381	Viaplay Sports	Report
19 February 2023	Championship	3	Widnes Vikings	H	Odsal Stadium	W	14-12	Blackmore, Foggin-Johnston, Holmes	Patton 1/3	4,827	-	Report
25 February 2023	Championship	4	Toulouse Olympique	H	Odsal Stadium	W	28-18	Arundel, Flanagan, Tindall, Wallace	Patton 6/6	2,798	-	Report
6 March 2023	Championship	5	Featherstone Rovers	A	Post Office Road	L	12-26	Arundel, Gill, Holmes	Patton 0/3	4,809	Viaplay Sports	Report
19 March 2023	Championship	6	Sheffield Eagles	H	Odsal Stadium	W	32-18	Holmes (2), Arundel, Flanagan, Tindall	Patton 6/7	3,004	-	Report
26 March 2023	Championship	7	Keighley Cougars	A	Cougar Park	L	6-34	Tindall	Patton 1/1	4,793	-	Report
10 April 2023	Championship	8	Halifax Panthers	A	Shay Stadium	W	26-22	Baldwinson, Gill, Holmes, Walters	Patton 5/5	3,053	Viaplay Sports	Report
16 April 2023	Championship	9	Batley Bulldogs	H	Odsal Stadium	L	16-21	Foggin-Johnston, Holmes, Jowitt	Patton 1/2, Lilley 1/1	3,330	-	Report
7 May 2023	Championship	10	Barrow Raiders	A	Craven Park	L	12-46	Roberts, Walker	Patton 1/4, Lilley 1/1	2,440	-	Report
14 May 2023	Championship	11	Swinton Lions	H	Odsal Stadium	W	44-38	Foggin-Johnston (2), Mason (2), Appo, England, Gill	Patton 8/8	2,935	-	Report
28 May 2023	Summer Bash	12	Keighley Cougars	N	York Community Stadium	W	42-18	Blackmore (2), Gill (2), Walker (2), Appo, Foggin-Johnston	Patton 5/8	2,948	Our League	Report
2 June 2023	Championship	13	Newcastle Thunder	A	Kingston Park	W	28-12	Appo, Baldwinson, Foggin-Johnston, Gill, Holmes	Patton 4/5	2,465	Viaplay Sports	Report
11 June 2023	Championship	14	London Broncos	H	Odsal Stadium	W	32-16	Gill (2), Holmes (2), Blackmore	Patton 6/6	3,482	-	Report
18 June 2023	Championship	15	Halifax Panthers	H	Odsal Stadium	D	22-22	Arundel, England, Rogers	Patton 5/5	4,717	-	Report
24 June 2023	Championship	16	Toulouse Olympique	A	Stade Ernest-Wallon	L	14-52	Blackmore, Gaskell, Gill	Patton 1/3	4,211	-	Report
2 July 2023	Championship	17	Keighley Cougars	H	Odsal Stadium	W	74-12	Gill (3), Taufua (3), Blackmore (2), Wallace (2), Wynne (2), Scurr	Patton 9/11, Thompson 2/2	4,879	-	Report
9 July 2023	Championship	18	Widnes Vikings	A	Halton Stadium	L	14-31	Butler, Gill	Patton 3/3	2,561	Viaplay Sports	Report
16 July 2023	Championship	19	Whitehaven R.L.F.C.	A	Recreation Ground	W	44-18	Appo, Blackmore, Butler, Gill, Matongo, Patton, Segeyaro, Wallace	Patton 6/8, Lilley 0/1	1,257	-	Report
23 July 2023	Championship	20	Barrow Raiders	H	Odsal Stadium	L	10-14	Blackmore, Myers	Gaskell 1/2	2,862	-	Report
6 August 2023	Championship	21	Batley Bulldogs	A	Mount Pleasant	W	42-6	Blackmore (2), Wallace (2), Appo, Lawrence, Scurr, Taufua	Lilley 5/8	2,780	-	Report
20 August 2023	Championship	22	Newcastle Thunder	H	Odsal Stadium	W	36-8	Flanagan (2), Arundel, Gill, Holmes, Lilley	Lilley 6/6	2,685	-	Report
27 August 2023	Championship	23	Swinton Lions	A	Heywood Road	W	42-26	Foggin-Johnston (2), Appo, Gill, Lilley, Myers, Rogers, Scurr	Lilley 5/8	1,073	-	Report
3 September 2023	Championship	24	Featherstone Rovers	H	Odsal Stadium	L	8-16	England, Myers	Lilley 0/2	4,567	-	Report
10 September 2023	Championship	25	York Knights	H	Odsal Stadium	L	10-20	Wynne	Lilley 3/3	3,603	-	Report
17 September 2023	Championship	26	London Broncos	A	Plough Lane	W	12-10	Myers (2)	Lilley 2/4	1,158	-	Report
22 September 2023	Championship	27	Sheffield Eagles	A	Olympic Legacy Park	W	17-16	Arundel, Lilley, Tindall	Lilley 2/3, Gaskell 0/1, Lilley 1 DG	1,976	Viaplay Sports	Report

Playoffs

Date	Competition	Rnd	Vrs	H/A	Venue	Result	Score	Tries	Goals	Att	Live on TV	Report
1 October 2023	Championship	EPO	York Knights	H	Odsal Stadium	W	22-8	Appo, Holmes, Rogers	Lilley 5/5	2,738	Viaplay Sports	Report
7 October 2023	Championship	SF	Toulouse Olympique	A	Stade Ernest-Wallon	L	20-38	Appo, Arundel, Taufua	Lilley 4/4	4,352	-	Report

=== Player appearances ===
FB=Fullback	C=Centre	W=Winger	SO=Stand Off	SH=Scrum half	P=Prop	H=Hooker	SR=Second Row	LF=Loose forward	B=Bench

No	Player	1	2	3	4	5	6	7	8	9	10	11	12	13	14	15	16	17	18	19	20	21	22	23	24	25	26	27	EPO	SF
1	Tom Holmes	SO	FB	FB	FB	FB	FB	FB	FB	FB			SO	SO	FB	FB					FB	FB	FB	FB	FB	SO	FB	FB	FB	FB
2	Ben Blackmore	W	W	W	W	W			W	W		W	W	W	W	W	W	W	W	W	W	W	W				W	W	W	W
3	Joe Arundel	C	C	C	C	C	C	C	C					C	C	C	C	C	C		SR	SR	SR	SR	C	C	SR	C	C	C
4	Keiran Gill	C	C	C	C	C	C	C	C	C	C	C	C	C	C	C	C	C	C	C	C	C	C	C	C	C	C	C	C	C
5	David Foggin-Johnston	W	W	W	x	x	W			W	x	W	W	W	W	W	W	x	x	x	x	x	W	W	W	W	x	x	x	x
6	Dec Patton	SH	SO	SO	SO	SO	SO	SO	SO	SO	SO	SO	SH	SH	SH	SO	SH	SH	SH	SH	SH	x	x	x	x	x	x	x	x	x
7	Jordan Lilley	H	SH	SH	SH	SH	SH	SH	SH	SH	SH	H	H	H	H	SH	H	H	H	B	B	SH	SH	SH	SH	SH	SH	SH	SH	SH
8	Jordan Baldwinson	B	B	P	P	P	P	P	P	P	P	P	P	P	P	P	P													
9	George Flanagan	B	H	H	H	H	H	H	H	H	H	B	x	x	x	H	x	x	x	x	H	H	H	H	H	H	B	x	H	H
10	Michael Lawrence	P	P		L	L										P	P	P	P	P	P	P	P	P	P	P	P	P	P	P
11	Brad England	B	SR	SR	SR							SR	SR	SR	B	B	B	B	Red card	Red card	Red card	Red card	Red card	Red card	SR	B				
12	Chester Butler	SR	B	SR			L	L			SR	C	C	L	SR	SR	SR	SR	SR	SR						SR	SR	SR	SR	SR
13	Bodene Thompson	L	L	L		SR			L	SR			SR	SR	SR	SR	SR	L	– (Note: Retirement)											
14	Ebon Scurr	Red card	Red card	Red card	Red card	Red card	B	B	B	P	B	B	B	B	B	B	B	B	B	B	B	B	B	B	B	B	B	B		
15	Ajahni Wallace	SR	SR	B	SR	SR	SR	SR	B	B	SR	SR	x	x	x	x	x	SR	SR	SR	SR	SR	SR	SR	SR	SR		SR	SR	SR
16	Brad Foster	P	P		B	B	B												L	x	x	x	x	x	x	x	x	x	x	x
17	Josh Johnson	x			B	B	x	B	Red card	B	B	L	L	B	x	– (Note: Was at Oldham R.L.F.C.)														
18	Keven Appo	– (Note: Awaiting visa from Papua New Guinea)		B	B	B	B	B	SR	SR		B	B	B	L	L	L	B	B	B	B	B	B	B	B	B	B	B	B	B
19	Max Clarke	x	x	x	x	x	– (Note: On loan at Doncaster R.L.F.C.)																							
20	Billy Jowitt	x	x	x	x	x	x	x	B	B	B	SH	B	B	SO								B	B	B	B	H	H	x	B
21	Fenton Rogers	B	B	P	P	P	P	P	Red card	Red card	P	P	P	P	P	B	B	– (Note: Was at Huddersfield Giants)			B	P	P	P	P		B	B	B	B
22	George Roby	x	B	B	B	B	Red card	B	Red card	– (Note: Returned to Huddersfield Giants)																				
23	James Segeyaro	– (Note: Was at Lézignan Sangliers)													B	B	B	B	B	H		B								
24	Masi Matongo	x	x	B											B	x	x	P	P	P	P	B						P	P	
25	Myles Lawford	x	x	x	x	x	x	x	x	x	x	x	x	x	x	– (Note: On loan at Hunslet R.L.F.C.)														
26	George Flanagan Jr	x	x	x	x	x	x	x	x	x	x	x	x	x	x	x	x	x	x	x	x	x	x	x	x	x	x	x	x	x
27	Connor Wynne	– (Note: Was at Hull F.C.)																FB	FB	FB	– (Note: Returned to Hull F.C.)			W	x	FB	x	B	B	x
28	Jorge Taufua	– (Note: Was at Wakefield Trinity)																W	W	W	W	W							W	W
29	Lee Gaskell	– (Note: Was at Wakefield Trinity)															SO	SO	SO	SO	SO	SO	SO	SO	SO		SO	SO	SO	SO
30	Jayden Myers	x	x	x	x	x	x	x	x	C	C	x	x	x	x	x	x	x	x	C	C	C	C	C	W		C	x	x	x
31	Jack Walker	FB									FB	FB	FB	FB	– (Note: Was at Hull Kingston Rovers)		FB	– (Note: Was at Hull Kingston Rovers)												
32	Marcus Green					x	x	x	x	x	x	x	x	x	x	– (Note: On loan at Hunslet R.L.F.C.)														
33	Bradley Ho																													
34	Michael Hoyle	x	x	x	x	x	x	x	x	x	x	x	x	x	x	x	x	x	x	x	x	x	x	x	x	x	x	x	x	x
35	Jack Bibby	– (Note: Was at Huddersfield Giants)							B	L	L	– (Note: Returned to Huddersfield Giants)																		
37	Jason Baitieri	– (Note: Was at Lézignan Sangliers)																	B	L	L	L	L	L	L	L	L		L	L
38	Liam Tindall	– (Note: Was at Leeds Rhinos)			W	W	W	W	– (Note: Was at Leeds Rhinos)																	W	W	W	x	x
39	Jansin Turgut	x	x	x	x	x	x	x	x	x	B	x	x	x	x	x	x	x	x	x	x	x	x	x	x	x	x	x	x	x
40	Nathan Mason	– (Note: Was at Huddersfield Giants)										B	B	– (Note: Was at Huddersfield Giants)																
40	Daniel Okoro	– (Note: Was at Huddersfield Giants)																		B	x	x	x	x	x	x	x	x	x	B
41	Eribe Doro	– (Note: Was at Halifax Panthers)																					B	B	B	P	P	L	B	P
42	Leon Ruan	– (Note: Was at Leeds Rhinos)					SR	SR	– (Note: Was at Leeds Rhinos)																					
43	Corey Johnson	– (Note: Was at Leeds Rhinos)					B	– (Note: Was at Leeds Rhinos)																						
44	Luis Roberts	– (Note: Was at Leeds Rhinos)						W	W	– (Note: Was at Leeds Rhinos)	W	– (Note: Was at Leeds Rhinos)																		
n/a	Sam Walters	– (Note: Was at Leeds Rhinos)							P	– (Note: Was at Leeds Rhinos)																				
n/a	James Donaldson	– (Note: Was at Leeds Rhinos)							SR	– (Note: Was at Leeds Rhinos)																				
n/a	Rob Butler	– (Note: Was at Wakefield Trinity)								B	– (Note: Returned to Wakefield Trinity)																			
n/a	Jason Qareqare	– (Note: Was at Castleford Tigers)									W	– (Note: Returned to Castleford Tigers)																		

= Injured

= Suspended

== Challenge Cup ==
LEGEND
Win
Draw
Loss

Date	Competition	Rnd	Vrs	H/A	Venue	Result	Score	Tries	Goals	Att	TV	Report
12 March 2023	Challenge Cup	3rd	York Acorn	H	Odsal Stadium	W	62-6	Gill (3), Scurr (2), Appo, Flanagan Jr, Foster, Lawford, Myers, Patton	Patton 5/6, Flanagan Jr 4/5	1,143	-	Report
2 April 2023	Challenge Cup	4th	Midlands Hurricanes	H	Odsal Stadium	W	66-18	Butler (3), Holmes (2), Jowitt (2), Appo, Arundel, Lawford, Rogers	Lawford 11/11	1,003	-	Report
22 April 2023	Challenge Cup	5th	Halifax Panthers	A	Shay Stadium	L	0-26	-	-	2,146	BBC Sport	Report

=== Player appearances ===
FB=Fullback	C=Centre	W=Winger	SO=Stand Off	SH=Scrum half	P=Prop	H=Hooker	SR=Second Row	LF=Loose forward	B=Bench

No	Player	3rd	4th	5th
1	Tom Holmes	x	SO	SO
2	Ben Blackmore	x	W	W
3	Joe Arundel	C	C	
4	Keiran Gill	C		C
5	David Foggin-Johnston	W	W	
6	Dec Patton	SO	x	SH
7	Jordan Lilley	x	H	H
8	Jordan Baldwinson	B	P	
9	George Flanagan	H	x	x
10	Michael Lawrence			
11	Brad England			
12	Chester Butler	SR	SR	L
13	Bodene Thompson			SR
14	Ebon Scurr	B	P	P
15	Ajahni Wallace	SR	B	
16	Brad Foster	L	L	B
17	Josh Johnson	P	B	B
18	Keven Appo	P	SR	SR
19	Max Clarke	x	x	x
20	Billy Jowitt	x	FB	B
21	Fenton Rogers	B	B	P
22	George Roby	x	x	x
25	Myles Lawford	SH	SH	x
26	George Flanagan Jr	FB	x	x
29	Rob Butler	x	x	B
30	Jayden Myers	W	C	C
31	Jack Walker			FB
32	Marcus Green	B	x	x
33	Bradley Ho	x	x	x
34	Michael Hoyle	x	x	x
37	Jason Qareqare	x	x	W
39	Jansin Turgut	x	B	x

== Squad statistics ==
- Appearances and points include (Championship, Challenge Cup and Play-offs) as of 7 October 2023.

No	Player	Position	Age	Previous club	Apps	Tries	Goals	DG	Points
1	Tom Holmes	Stand off	27	Featherstone Rovers	25	13	0	0	52
2	Ben Blackmore	Wing	30	Dewsbury Rams	25	11	0	0	44
3	Joe Arundel	Centre	32	Halifax Panthers	26	8	0	0	32
4	Kieran Gill	Centre	27	Newcastle Thunder	31	21	0	0	84
5	David Foggin-Johnston	Wing	26	Hunslet R.L.F.C.	17	9	0	0	36
6	Declan Patton	Stand off	27	Salford Red Devils	22	2	79	0	166
7	Jordan Lilley	Scrum half	26	Leeds Rhinos	31	4	34	1	85
8	Jordan Baldwinson	Prop	28	York City Knights	18	2	0	0	8
9	George Flanagan	Hooker	36	Hunslet R.L.F.C.	22	5	0	0	20
10	Michael Lawrence	Prop	33	Huddersfield Giants	19	1	0	0	4
11	Brad England	Second row	28	Doncaster R.L.F.C.	13	3	0	0	12
12	Chester Butler	Second row	27	Huddersfield Giants	23	6	0	0	24
13	Bodene Thompson	Loose forward	35	Leeds Rhinos	13	1	2	0	8
14	Ebon Scurr	Prop	22	Bradford Bulls Academy	25	5	0	0	20
15	Ajahni Wallace	Second row	20	Leeds Rhinos	25	6	0	0	24
16	Brad Foster	Prop	26	London Broncos	9	1	0	0	4
17	Josh Johnson	Prop	29	Widnes Vikings	11	0	0	0	0
18	Keven Appo	Loose forward	24	PNG Hunters	29	10	0	0	40
19	Max Clarke	Centre	23	Hull F.C.	0	0	0	0	0
20	Billy Jowitt	Fullback	21	Bradford Bulls Academy	16	3	0	0	12
21	Fenton Rogers	Prop	19	Huddersfield Giants (Loan)	26	4	0	0	16
22	George Roby	Hooker	20	Huddersfield Giants (Loan)	5	0	0	0	0
23	James Segeyaro	Hooker	32	Lézignan Sangliers	7	1	0	0	4
24	Masi Matongo	Prop	27	York Knights	9	1	0	0	4
25	Myles Lawford	Scrum half	18	Bradford Bulls Academy	2	2	11	0	30
26	George Flanagan Jr	Fullback	18	Bradford Bulls Academy	1	1	4	0	12
27	Connor Wynne	Fullback	n/a	Hull F.C. (Loan)	7	3	0	0	12
28	Jorge Taufua	Wing	31	Wakefield Trinity	7	5	0	0	20
29	Lee Gaskell	Stand Off	32	Wakefield Trinity	13	1	1	0	6
30	Jayden Myers	Wing	18	Bradford Bulls Academy	12	6	0	0	24
31	Jack Walker	Fullback	24	Leeds Rhinos	7	3	0	0	12
32	Marcus Green	Prop	18	Bradford Bulls Academy	1	0	0	0	0
33	Bradley Ho	Prop	21	Bradford Bulls Academy	0	0	0	0	0
34	Michael Hoyle	Prop	n/a	Army RL	0	0	0	0	0
35	Jack Bibby	Prop	n/a	Huddersfield Giants (Loan)	3	0	0	0	0
36	Sam Walters	Second Row	22	Leeds Rhinos (Loan)	1	1	0	0	4
37	Jason Baitieri	Loose Forward	34	Lézignan Sangliers	11	0	0	0	0
38	Liam Tindall	Wing	21	Leeds Rhinos (Loan)	7	4	0	0	16
39	Jansin Turgut	Loose forward	27	Retirement	2	0	0	0	0
40	Nathan Mason	Prop	29	Huddersfield Giants (Loan)	2	2	0	0	8
40	Daniel Okoro	Prop	19	Newcastle Thunder	2	0	0	0	0
41	Eribe Doro	Prop	22	Halifax Panthers	8	0	0	0	0
42	Leon Ruan	Second row	n/a	Leeds Rhinos (Loan)	2	0	0	0	0
43	Corey Johnson	Hooker	22	Leeds Rhinos (Loan)	1	0	0	0	0
44	Luis Roberts	Wing	n/a	Leeds Rhinos (Loan)	3	1	0	0	4
46	James Donaldson	Second Row	31	Leeds Rhinos (Loan)	1	0	0	0	0
n/a	Rob Butler	Prop	n/a	Wakefield Trinity (Loan)	2	0	0	0	0
n/a	Jason Qareqare	Wing	20	Castleford Tigers (Loan)	2	0	0	0	0

== Transfers ==
=== In ===
	Name	Position	Signed from	Date
(England)	Chester Butler	Second row	Huddersfield Giants	August 2022
(England)	Ben Blackmore	Wing	Dewsbury Rams	August 2022
(England)	Tom Holmes	Stand off	Featherstone Rovers	August 2022
(England)	Brad Foster	Loose Forward	London Broncos	September 2022
(England)	Jack Walker	Fullback	Leeds Rhinos	October 2022
(Australia)	Dalton Desmond-Walker	Prop	Keighley Cougars	October 2022
(New Zealand)	Bodene Thompson	Second row	Leeds Rhinos	October 2022
(England)	Max Clarke	Centre	Hull F.C.	November 2022
(England)	George Roby	Hooker	Huddersfield Giants (Loan)	November 2022
(England)	Fenton Rogers	Prop	Huddersfield Giants (Loan)	November 2022
(England)	Michael Lawrence	Prop	Huddersfield Giants	November 2022
(Papua New Guinea)	Keven Appo	Loose forward	PNG Hunters	November 2022
(England)	Joe Arundel	Centre	Halifax Panthers	January 2023
(England)	Josh Johnson	Prop	Widnes Vikings	January 2023
(Zimbabwe)	Masi Matongo	Prop	York Knights	January 2023
(England)	Jack Bibby	Prop	Huddersfield Giants (Loan)	April 2023
(Fiji)	Jason Qareqare	Wing	Castleford Tigers (Loan)	April 2023
(France)	Jason Baitieri	Loose Forward	Lézignan Sangliers	May 2023
(Papua New Guinea)	James Segeyaro	Hooker	Lézignan Sangliers	June 2023
(England)	Lee Gaskell	Stand off	Wakefield Trinity	June 2023
(England)	Connor Wynne	Fullback	Hull F.C. (Loan)	June 2023
(Australia)	Jorge Taufua	Wing	Wakefield Trinity	June 2023
(Nigeria)	Daniel Okoro	Prop	Newcastle Thunder	June 2023
(England)	Eribe Doro	Prop	Halifax Panthers	August 2023

=== Out ===
	Name	Position	Club Signed	Date
(Wales)	Ben Evans	Loose forward	Barrow Raiders	June 2022
(England)	Daniel Fleming	Prop	Featherstone Rovers	July 2022
(England)	Steve Crossley	Prop	Hunslet R.L.F.C.	September 2022
(England)	Aaron Murphy	Second row	Sheffield Eagles	September 2022
(England)	Thomas Doyle	Hooker	Keighley Cougars	September 2022
(England)	Joe Burton	Wing	Hunslet R.L.F.C.	September 2022
(England)	Anthony Walker	Prop	Widnes Vikings	October 2022
(England)	Matty Dawson-Jones	Wing	Sheffield Eagles	October 2022
(Wales)	Elliot Kear	Fullback	Batley Bulldogs	October 2022
(England)	Sam Hallas	Loose forward	Kurri Kurri Bulldogs	October 2022
(Wales)	Rhys Evans	Centre	Retirement	November 2022
(England)	Elliot Hall	Fullback	Doncaster R.L.F.C.	November 2022
(Republic of the Congo)	Samy Kibula	Prop	Batley Bulldogs	November 2022
(England)	Ryan Millar	Wing	Widnes Vikings	November 2022
(Australia)	Dalton Desmond-Walker	Prop	Released	December 2022
(England)	Sam Scott	Second row	Retirement	January 2023
(England)	Michael Hoyle	Prop	Released	March 2023
(England)	Jack Walker	Fullback	Hull Kingston Rovers	June 2023
(England)	Josh Johnson	Prop	Oldham R.L.F.C.	June 2023
