= 2023 RFL Championship season results =

The fixture list for the 2023 RFL Championship was issued on 13 November 2022. The regular season comprises 27 rounds to be followed by the play-offs.

All times are UK local time (UTC±00:00 until 26 March 2023, UTC+01:00 thereafter).

== Regular season ==
=== Round 1 ===
Betfred Championship: round one
Home	Score	Away	Match Information
Home	Score	Away	Date and Time	Venue	Referee	Attendance
Barrow Raiders	4–24	Toulouse Olympique	4 February 2023, 15:00	Craven Park	C. Worsley	2,177
Bradford Bulls	24–8	Whitehaven	5 February 2023, 15:00	Odsal Stadium	N. Bennett	4,870
Halifax Panthers	26–18	Sheffield Eagles	5 February 2023, 15:00	The Shay	L. Rush	2,107
London Broncos	20–30	Batley Bulldogs	5 February 2023, 15:00	Plough Lane	A. Moore	1,849
Swinton Lions	6–18	Newcastle Thunder	5 February 2023, 15:00	Heywood Road	B. Milligan	877
York Knights	12–19	Widnes Vikings	5 February 2023, 15:00	York Community Stadium	M. Smaill	2,117
Keighley Cougars	0–50	Featherstone Rovers	6 February 2023, 19:45	Cougar Park	T. Grant	2,443

=== Round 2 ===
Betfred Championship: round two
Home	Score	Away	Match Information
Home	Score	Away	Date and Time	Venue	Referee	Attendance
Toulouse Olympique	58–0	Newcastle Thunder	11 February 2023, 18:00	Stade Ernest-Wallon	M. Griffiths	3,047
Barrow Raiders	16–36	Sheffield Eagles	12 February 2023, 15:00	Craven Park	B. Thaler	2,094
Batley Bulldogs	16–30	Swinton Lions	12 February 2023, 15:00	Fox's Biscuits Stadium	A. Moore	1,551
Whitehaven	16–20	London Broncos	12 February 2023, 15:00	Recreation Ground	T. Grant	750
Widnes Vikings	26–18	Keighley Cougars	12 February 2023, 15:00	Halton Stadium	L. Moore	3,498
Featherstone Rovers	46–22	Halifax Panthers	12 February 2023, 16:00	Post Office Road	C. Kendall	3,974
York Knights	32–16	Bradford Bulls	13 February 2023, 19:45	York Community Stadium	J. Smith	2,381

=== Round 3 ===
Betfred Championship: round three
Home	Score	Away	Match Information
Home	Score	Away	Date and Time	Venue	Referee	Attendance
Sheffield Eagles	36–0	Batley Bulldogs	17 February 2023, 19:30	Sheffield Olympic Legacy Stadium	J. Vella	878
Toulouse Olympique	36–0	York Knights	18 February 2023, 18:00	Stade Ernest-Wallon	A. Moore	2,761
Bradford Bulls	14–12	Widnes Vikings	19 February 2023, 15:00	Odsal Stadium	B. Thaler	4,827
Featherstone Rovers	76–4	Whitehaven	19 February 2023, 15:00	Post Office Road	M. Smaill	2,248
Halifax Panthers	26–18	London Broncos	19 February 2023, 15:00	The Shay	C. Worsley	1,950
Keighley Cougars	44–24	Newcastle Thunder	19 February 2023, 15:00	Cougar Park	N. Bennett	1,658
Swinton Lions	20–18	Barrow Raiders	19 February 2023, 15:00	Heywood Road	L. Rush	1,139

=== Round 4 ===
Betfred Championship: round four
Home	Score	Away	Match Information
Home	Score	Away	Date and Time	Venue	Referee	Attendance
Bradford Bulls	28–18	Toulouse Olympique	25 February 2023, 13:00	Odsal Stadium	M. Smaill	2,798
Batley Bulldogs	28–23	Keighley Cougars	26 February 2023, 15:00	Fox's Biscuits Stadium	L. Rush	1,624
Featherstone Rovers	56–6	Newcastle Thunder	26 February 2023, 15:00	Post Office Road	C. Worsley	2,489
London Broncos	20–21	Sheffield Eagles	26 February 2023, 15:00	Plough Lane	J. Vella	1,175
Whitehaven	20–4	Swinton Lions	26 February 2023, 15:00	Recreation Ground	N. Bennett	891
York Knights	28–14	Barrow Raiders	26 February 2023, 15:00	York Community Stadium	S. Mikalauskas	1,525
Widnes Vikings	42–14	Halifax Panthers	27 February 2023, 19:45	Halton Stadium	B. Thaler	3,187

=== Round 5 ===
Betfred Championship: round five
Home	Score	Away	Match Information
Home	Score	Away	Date and Time	Venue	Referee	Attendance
Toulouse Olympique	72–10	Whitehaven	4 March 2023, 18:00	Stade Ernest-Wallon	B. Thaler	2,558
Barrow Raiders	18–18	Newcastle Thunder	5 March 2023, 15:00	Craven Park	M. Smaill	1,752
Halifax Panthers	20–16	Batley Bulldogs	5 March 2023, 15:00	The Shay	S. Mikalauskas	1,703
Keighley Cougars	33–22	London Broncos	5 March 2023, 15:00	Cougar Park	N. Bennett	1,693
Sheffield Eagles	42–12	Widnes Vikings	5 March 2023, 15:00	Sheffield Olympic Legacy Stadium	L. Rush	1,319
Swinton Lions	0–40	York Knights	5 March 2023, 15:00	Heywood Road	C. Worsley	1,029
Featherstone Rovers	26–12	Bradford Bulls	6 March 2023, 19:45	Post Office Road	J. Vella	4,012

=== Round 6 ===
Betfred Championship: round six
Home	Score	Away	Match Information
Home	Score	Away	Date and Time	Venue	Referee	Attendance
Newcastle Thunder	6–36	London Broncos	18 March 2023, 15:00	Kingston Park	N. Bennett	978
Widnes Vikings	12–14	Toulouse Olympique	18 March 2023, 15:00	Halton Stadium	J. Vella	3,093
Bradford Bulls	32–18	Sheffield Eagles	19 March 2023, 15:00	Odsal Stadium	M. Rossleigh	3,004
Halifax Panthers	34–10	Keighley Cougars	19 March 2023, 15:00	The Shay	L. Rush	2,123
Swinton Lions	6–34	Featherstone Rovers	19 March 2023, 15:00	Heywood Road	M. Smaill	1,090
York Knights	12–14	Whitehaven	19 March 2023, 15:00	York Community Stadium	S. Mikalauskas	1,614
Batley Bulldogs	24–12	Barrow Raiders	20 March 2023, 19:45	Crown Flatt (Note: Match moved at short notice to Dewsbury due to issues with the floodlights at Batley.)	C. Worsley	1,187

=== Round 7 ===
Betfred Championship: round seven
Home	Score	Away	Match Information
Home	Score	Away	Date and Time	Venue	Referee	Attendance
Sheffield Eagles	32–4	Toulouse Olympique	25 March 2023, 18:00	Sheffield Olympic Legacy Stadium	T. Grant	959
Barrow Raiders	16–12	Halifax Panthers	26 March 2023, 15:00	Craven Park	J. Vella	1,879
Featherstone Rovers	46–4	York Knights	26 March 2023, 15:00	Post Office Road	L. Rush	2,892
Keighley Cougars	34–6	Bradford Bulls	26 March 2023, 15:00	Cougar Park	S. Mikalauskas	4,793
London Broncos	16–14	Swinton Lions	26 March 2023, 15:00	Plough Lane	N. Bennett	829
Whitehaven	16–18	Batley Bulldogs	26 March 2023, 15:00	Recreation Ground	M. Smaill	1,006
Widnes Vikings	24–16	Newcastle Thunder	26 March 2023, 15:00	Halton Stadium	C. Worsley	2,743

=== Round 8 ===
Betfred Championship: round eight
Home	Score	Away	Match Information
Home	Score	Away	Date and Time	Venue	Referee	Attendance
Barrow Raiders	14–16	Whitehaven	7 April 2023, 15:00	Craven Park	C. Worsley	3,136
Newcastle Thunder	20–44	Sheffield Eagles	7 April 2023, 15:00	Kingston Park	B. Milligan	817
Swinton Lions	16–48	Widnes Vikings	7 April 2023, 15:00	Heywood Road	S. Mikalauskas	1,403
Batley Bulldogs	18–26	Featherstone Rovers	7 April 2023, 15:30	Fox's Biscuits Stadium	J. Vella	2,287
Toulouse Olympique	52–0	London Broncos	7 April 2023, 18:00	Stade Ernest-Wallon	M. Smaill	3,358
York Knights	10–22	Keighley Cougars	7 April 2023, 19:30	York Community Stadium	N. Bennett	2,168
Halifax Panthers	22–26	Bradford Bulls	10 April 2023, 19:45	The Shay	T. Grant	3,053

=== Round 9 ===
Betfred Championship: round nine
Home	Score	Away	Match Information
Home	Score	Away	Date and Time	Venue	Referee	Attendance
Keighley Cougars	6–34	Toulouse Olympique	15 April 2023, 15:00	Cougar Park	T. Grant	1,739
Bradford Bulls	16–21	Batley Bulldogs	16 April 2023, 15:00	Odsal Stadium	L. Rush	3,330
Halifax Panthers	16–6	York Knights	16 April 2023, 15:00	The Shay	J. Vella	1,454
London Broncos	10–40	Featherstone Rovers	16 April 2023, 15:00	Plough Lane	M. Smaill	977
Whitehaven	31–6	Newcastle Thunder	16 April 2023, 15:00	Recreation Ground	C. Worsley	987
Widnes Vikings	23–14	Barrow Raiders	16 April 2023, 15:00	Halton Stadium	S. Mikalauskas	2,772
Sheffield Eagles	16–6	Swinton Lions	17 April 2023, 19:45	Sheffield Olympic Legacy Stadium	N. Bennett	1,179

=== Round 10 ===
Betfred Championship: round ten
Home	Score	Away	Match Information
Home	Score	Away	Date and Time	Venue	Referee	Attendance
Swinton Lions	19–12	Toulouse Olympique	6 May 2023, 15:00	Heywood Road	B. Milligan	957
Barrow Raiders	46–12	Bradford Bulls	7 May 2023, 15:00	Craven Park	J. Vella	2,440
Featherstone Rovers	30–28	Sheffield Eagles	7 May 2023, 15:00	Post Office Road	T. Grant	3,187
Newcastle Thunder	16–36	Halifax Panthers	7 May 2023, 15:00	Kingston Park	S. Mikalauskas	1,097
Whitehaven	24–32	Keighley Cougars	7 May 2023, 15:00	Recreation Ground	L. Rush	1,065
York Knights	30–28	London Broncos	7 May 2023, 15:00	York Community Stadium	C. Worsley	1,802
Batley Bulldogs	11–4	Widnes Vikings	8 May 2023, 19:45	Fox's Biscuits Stadium	M. Smaill	923

=== Round 11 ===
Betfred Championship: round eleven
Home	Score	Away	Match Information
Home	Score	Away	Date and Time	Venue	Referee	Attendance
London Broncos	30–16	Barrow Raiders	13 May 2023, 14:00	Plough Lane	M. Smaill	806
Batley Bulldogs	17–16	Toulouse Olympique	13 May 2023, 18:00	Fox's Biscuits Stadium	T. Grant	1,320
Bradford Bulls	44–38	Swinton Lions	14 May 2023, 15:00	Odsal Stadium	C. Worsley	2,935
Halifax Panthers	60–0	Whitehaven	14 May 2023, 15:00	The Shay	N. Bennett	1,998
Keighley Cougars	18–46	Sheffield Eagles	14 May 2023, 15:00	Cougar Park	J. Vella	1,347
Widnes Vikings	0–30	Featherstone Rovers	14 May 2023, 15:00	Halton Stadium	L. Rush	2,832
York Knights	26–22	Newcastle Thunder	14 May 2023, 15:00	York Community Stadium	S. Mikalauskas	2,276

=== Round 12 ===
Round 12 is the Summer Bash where all the fixtures are played at one ground over the weekend. The venue for 2023 is the York Community Stadium.

Betfred Championship: round twelve
Home	Score	Away	Match Information
Home	Score	Away	Date and Time	Venue	Referee	Attendance
Widnes Vikings	38–6	Swinton Lions	27 May 2023, 12:45	York Community Stadium	C. Worlsey	3,793
Whitehaven	16–32	Barrow Raiders	27 May 2023, 15:00	York Community Stadium	M. Smaill	3,793
Toulouse Olympique	10–14	London Broncos	27 May 2023, 17:15	York Community Stadium	L. Rush	3,793
Featherstone Rovers	46–16	York Knights	27 May 2023, 19:30	York Community Stadium	S. Mikalauskas	3,793
Newcastle Thunder	32–38	Sheffield Eagles	28 May 2023, 13:45	York Community Stadium	N. Bennett	2,948
Halifax Panthers	12–20	Batley Bulldogs	28 May 2023, 16:00	York Community Stadium	J. Vella	2,948
Keighley Cougars	18–42	Bradford Bulls	28 May 2023, 18:15	York Community Stadium	T. Grant	2,948

=== Round 13 ===
Betfred Championship: round thirteen
Home	Score	Away	Match Information
Home	Score	Away	Date and Time	Venue	Referee	Attendance
Newcastle Thunder	12–28	Bradford Bulls	2 June 2023, 19:45	Kingston Park	M. Smaill	2,465
Toulouse Olympique	28–22	Halifax Panthers	3 June 2023, 18:00	Stade Ernest-Wallon	J. Vella	4,806
Batley Bulldogs	14–8	York Knights	4 June 2023, 15:00	Fox's Biscuits Stadium	M. Rossleigh	2,991
Featherstone Rovers	64–6	Barrow Raiders	4 June 2023, 15:00	Post Office Road	N. Bennett	2,756
Keighley Cougars	28–32	Swinton Lions	4 June 2023, 15:00	Cougar Park	B. Milligan	1,138
Sheffield Eagles	26–40	Whitehaven	4 June 2023, 15:00	Sheffield Olympic Legacy Stadium	K. Moore	1,179
Widnes Vikings	18–26	London Broncos	4 June 2023, 15:00	Halton Stadium	A. Sweet	2,547

=== Round 14 ===
Betfred Championship: round fourteen
Home	Score	Away	Match Information
Home	Score	Away	Date and Time	Venue	Referee	Attendance
Sheffield Eagles	40–10	York Knights	9 June 2023, 19:30	Sheffield Olympic Legacy Stadium	M. Smaill	1,051
Featherstone Rovers	18–36	Toulouse Olympique	10 June 2023, 18:00	Post Office Road	T. Grant	3,489
Barrow Raiders	18–16	Keighley Cougars	11 June 2023, 15:00	Craven Park	N. Bennett	2,250
Bradford Bulls	32–16	London Broncos	11 June 2023, 15:00	Odsal Stadium	J. Vella	3,482
Newcastle Thunder	12–26	Batley Bulldogs	11 June 2023, 15:00	Kingston Park	C. Worsley	694
Swinton Lions	8–46	Halifax Panthers	11 June 2023, 15:00	Heywood Road	M. Rossleigh	1,109
Whitehaven	36–12	Widnes Vikings	11 June 2023, 15:00	Recreation Ground	L. Rush	960

=== Round 15 ===
Betfred Championship: round fifteen
Home	Score	Away	Match Information
Home	Score	Away	Date and Time	Venue	Referee	Attendance
Toulouse Olympique	48–10	Sheffield Eagles	17 June 2023, 18:00	Stade Ernest-Wallon	A. Moore	3,344
Barrow Raiders	26–18	Widnes Vikings	18 June 2023, 15:00	Craven Park	J. Vella	2,150
Bradford Bulls	22–22	Halifax Panthers	18 June 2023, 15:00	Odsal Stadium	T. Grant	4,717
Featherstone Rovers	50–6	London Broncos	18 June 2023, 15:00	Post Office Road	L. Rush	2,255
Newcastle Thunder	18–16	Keighley Cougars	18 June 2023, 15:00	Kingston Park	M. Rossleigh	684
Swinton Lions	6–48	Batley Bulldogs	18 June 2023, 15:00	Heywood Road	M. Smaill	1,009
Whitehaven	26–24	York Knights	28 June 2023, 19:30 (Note: Postponed from 18 June due to York's continued involvement in the Challenge Cup.)	Recreation Ground	M. Smaill	951

=== Round 16 ===
Betfred Championship: round sixteen
Home	Score	Away	Match Information
Home	Score	Away	Date and Time	Venue	Referee	Attendance
Sheffield Eagles	40–0	Newcastle Thunder	23 June 2023, 19:30	Sheffield Olympic Legacy Stadium	M. Smaill	879
Toulouse Olympique	52–14	Bradford Bulls	24 June 2023, 18:00	Stade Ernest-Wallon	L. Rush	4,211
Batley Bulldogs	18–20	London Broncos	25 June 2023, 15:00	Fox's Biscuits Stadium	T. Grant	1,372
Halifax Panthers	48–20	Barrow Raiders	25 June 2023, 15:00	The Shay	C. Worsley	1,744
Keighley Cougars	28–18	Whitehaven	25 June 2023, 15:00	Cougar Park	M. Rossleigh	2,106
Widnes Vikings	18–25	Swinton Lions	25 June 2023, 15:00	Halton Stadium	S. Mikalauskas	2,833
York Knights	8–24	Featherstone Rovers	25 June 2023, 15:00	York Community Stadium	J. Vella	2,554

=== Round 17 ===
Betfred Championship: round seventeen
Home	Score	Away	Match Information
Home	Score	Away	Date and Time	Venue	Referee	Attendance
Toulouse Olympique	42–28	Widnes Vikings	1 July 2023, 18:00	Stade Ernest-Wallon	T. Grant	3,870
Barrow Raiders	6–12	Batley Bulldogs	2 July 2023, 15:00	Craven Park	J. Vella	2,096
Bradford Bulls	74–12	Keighley Cougars	2 July 2023, 15:00	Odsal Stadium	S. Mikalauskas	4,879
London Broncos	50–16	Newcastle Thunder	2 July 2023, 15:00	Stonebridge Road	N. Bennett	1,208
Swinton Lions	30–22	Sheffield Eagles	2 July 2023, 15:00	Heywood Road	L. Rush	1,094
Whitehaven	0–60	Featherstone Rovers	2 July 2023, 15:00	Recreation Ground	C. Worsley	841
York Knights	28–18	Halifax Panthers	2 July 2023, 15:00	York Community Stadium	M. Smaill	1,823

=== Round 18 ===
Betfred Championship: round eighteen
Home	Score	Away	Match Information
Home	Score	Away	Date and Time	Venue	Referee	Attendance
London Broncos	22–6	Toulouse Olympique	8 July 2023, 18:00	Stonebridge Road	M. Rossleigh	1,089
Batley Bulldogs	42–0	Halifax Panthers	9 July 2023, 15:00	Fox's Biscuits Stadium	L. Rush	2,014
Featherstone Rovers	52–6	Swinton Lions	9 July 2023, 15:00	Post Office Road	M. Smaill	2,845
Keighley Cougars	10–50	York Knights	9 July 2023, 15:00	Cougar Park	N. Bennett	1,654
Newcastle Thunder	30–12	Whitehaven	9 July 2023, 15:00	Kingston Park	R. Cox	1,284
Sheffield Eagles	36–18	Barrow Raiders	9 July 2023, 15:00	Sheffield Olympic Legacy Stadium	C. Worsley	1,011
Widnes Vikings	31–14	Bradford Bulls	9 July 2023, 15:00	Halton Stadium	J. Vella	2,561

=== Round 19 ===
Betfred Championship: round nineteen
Home	Score	Away	Match Information
Home	Score	Away	Date and Time	Venue	Referee	Attendance
Toulouse Olympique	34–12	Batley Bulldogs	15 July 2023, 18:00	Stade Ernest-Wallon	M. Smaill	3,557
Barrow Raiders	10–20	Featherstone Rovers	16 July 2023, 15:00	Craven Park	L. Rush	2,361
Halifax Panthers	50–12	Newcastle Thunder	16 July 2023, 15:00	The Shay	C. Worsley	1,453
Keighley Cougars	22–38	Widnes Vikings	16 July 2023, 15:00	Cougar Park	S. Mikalauskas	1,267
Swinton Lions	6–12	London Broncos	16 July 2023, 15:00	Heywood Road	M. Rossleigh	940
Whitehaven	18–44	Bradford Bulls	16 July 2023, 15:00	Recreation Ground	N. Bennett	1,257
York Knights	23–18	Sheffield Eagles	16 July 2023, 15:00	York Community Stadium	J. Vella	2,266

=== Round 20 ===
Betfred Championship: round twenty
Home	Score	Away	Match Information
Home	Score	Away	Date and Time	Venue	Referee	Attendance
Sheffield Eagles	32–30	Halifax Panthers	28 July 2023, 19:30	Sheffield Olympic Legacy Stadium	S. Mikalauskas	1,327
Featherstone Rovers	28–8	Batley Bulldogs	29 July 2023, 18:00	Post Office Road	B. Thaler	3,145
Toulouse Olympique	64–0	Keighley Cougars	29 July 2023, 18:00	Stade Ernest-Wallon	L. Rush	3,250
London Broncos	10–24	York Knights	30 July 2023, 15:00	Plough Lane	M. Smaill	957
Newcastle Thunder	25–19	Swinton Lions	30 July 2023, 15:00	Kingston Park	M. Rossleigh	889
Widnes Vikings	36–28	Whitehaven	30 July 2023, 15:00	Halton Stadium	J. Vella	2,785
Bradford Bulls	10–14	Barrow Raiders	31 July 2023, 19:45	Odsal Stadium	C. Worsley	2,862

=== Round 21 ===
Betfred Championship: round twenty one
Home	Score	Away	Match Information
Home	Score	Away	Date and Time	Venue	Referee	Attendance
Newcastle Thunder	6–50	Widnes Vikings	5 August 2023, 15:00	Kingston Park	M. Smaill	2,206
York Knights	14–18	Toulouse Olympique	5 August 2023, 18:00	York Community Stadium	B. Thaler	1,483
Barrow Raiders	6–26	London Broncos	6 August 2023, 15:00	Fox's Biscuits Stadium	M. Rossleigh	1,786
Batley Bulldogs	6–42	Bradford Bulls	6 August 2023, 15:00	Craven Park	J. Vella	2,780
Swinton Lions	18–10	Keighley Cougars	6 August 2023, 15:00	Heywood Road	N. Bennett	1,179
Whitehaven	32–20	Sheffield Eagles	6 August 2023, 15:00	Recreation Ground	S. Mikalauskas	720
Halifax Panthers	25–22	Featherstone Rovers	6 August 2023, 17:30	The Shay	L. Rush	1,609

=== Round 22 ===
Betfred Championship: round twenty two
Home	Score	Away	Match Information
Home	Score	Away	Date and Time	Venue	Referee	Attendance
Sheffield Eagles	10–38	Featherstone Rovers	18 August 2023, 19:30	Sheffield Olympic Legacy Stadium	J. Vella	1,709
Toulouse Olympique	26–6	Swinton Lions	19 August 2023, 18:00	Stade Albert Domec, Carcassonne (Note: Toulouse's ground being used for the Rugby Union World Cup.)	N. Bennett	2,430
Bradford Bulls	36–8	Newcastle Thunder	20 August 2023, 15:00	Odsal Stadium	K. Moore	2,685
Keighley Cougars	26–20	Batley Bulldogs	20 August 2023, 15:00	Cougar Park	S. Mikalauskas	1,468
London Broncos	26–12	Halifax Panthers	20 August 2023, 15:00	Plough Lane	L. Rush	859
Widnes Vikings	30–40	York Knights	20 August 2023, 15:00	Halton Stadium	M. Smaill	3,008
Whitehaven	22–23	Barrow Raiders	21 August 2023, 19:45	Recreation Ground	M. Rossleigh	1,176

=== Round 23 ===
Betfred Championship: round twenty three
Home	Score	Away	Match Information
Home	Score	Away	Date and Time	Venue	Referee	Attendance
Batley Bulldogs	6–49	Sheffield Eagles	25 August 2023, 19:30	Fox's Biscuits Stadium	L. Rush	1,209
Newcastle Thunder	6–20	York Knights	25 August 2023, 19:45	Kingston Park	R. Cox	788
Toulouse Olympique	34–10	Barrow Raiders	26 August 2023, 18:00	Stade Mazicou, Albi	M. Smaill	2,487
Featherstone Rovers	36–6	Keighley Cougars	27 August 2023, 15:00	Post Office Road	J. Vella	3,235
Halifax Panthers	26–28	Widnes Vikings	27 August 2023, 15:00	The Shay	C. Worsley	1,685
London Broncos	34–18	Whitehaven	27 August 2023, 15:00	Plough Lane	N. Bennett	786
Swinton Lions	26–42	Bradford Bulls	27 August 2023, 15:00	Heywood Road	S. Mikalauskas	1,073

=== Round 24 ===
Betfred Championship: round twenty four
Home	Score	Away	Match Information
Home	Score	Away	Date and Time	Venue	Referee	Attendance
Newcastle Thunder	16–36	Toulouse Olympique	2 September 2023, 18:00	Kingston Park	M. Rossleigh	639
Bradford Bulls	8–16	Featherstone Rovers	3 September 2023, 15:00	Odsal Stadium	J. Vella	4,567
Keighley Cougars	26–20	Barrow Raiders	3 September 2023, 15:00	Cougar Park	M. Smaill	1,628
Sheffield Eagles	18–26	London Broncos	3 September 2023, 15:00	Sheffield Olympic Legacy Stadium	L. Rush	910
Whitehaven	8–30	Halifax Panthers	3 September 2023, 15:00	Recreation Ground	B. Milligan	1,056
Widnes Vikings	12–4	Batley Bulldogs	3 September 2023, 15:00	Halton Stadium	S. Mikalauskas	3,219
York Knights	26–22	Swinton Lions	3 September 2023, 15:00	York Community Stadium	C. Worsley	2,114

=== Round 25 ===
Betfred Championship: round twenty five
Home	Score	Away	Match Information
Home	Score	Away	Date and Time	Venue	Referee	Attendance
Sheffield Eagles	38–10	Keighley Cougars	8 September 2023, 19:30	Sheffield Olympic Legacy Stadium	C. Worsley	932
Newcastle Thunder	22–56	Featherstone Rovers	8 September 2023, 20:00	Kingston Park	M. Smaill	747
Halifax Panthers	26–18	Toulouse Olympique	9 September 2023, 18:00	The Shay	M. Griffiths	1,437
Barrow Raiders	32–14	Swinton Lions	10 September 2023, 15:00	Craven Park	L. Rush	2,117
Batley Bulldogs	25–12	Whitehaven	10 September 2023, 15:00	Fox's Biscuits Stadium	M. Rossleigh	1,122
Bradford Bulls	10–20	York Knights	10 September 2023, 15:00	Odsal Stadium	S. Mikalauskas	3,603
London Broncos	52–12	Widnes Vikings	10 September 2023, 15:00	Plough Lane	J. Vella	1,062

=== Round 26 ===
Betfred Championship: round twenty six
Home	Score	Away	Match Information
Home	Score	Away	Date and Time	Venue	Referee	Attendance
Newcastle Thunder	36–24	Barrow Raiders	16 September 2023, 15:00	Kingston Park	C. Worsley	904
Toulouse Olympique	16–29	Featherstone Rovers	16 September 2023, 18:00	Stade des Minimes (Note: Stade Ernest Wallon still in use in the rugby union World Cup)	M. Smaill	2,603
Keighley Cougars	22–23	Halifax Panthers	17 September 2023, 15:00	Cougar Park	N. Bennett	2,367
London Broncos	10–12	Bradford Bulls	17 September 2023, 15:00	Plough Lane	L. Rush	1,158
Swinton Lions	21–20	Whitehaven	17 September 2023, 15:00	Heywood Road	A. Moore	1,315
Widnes Vikings	18–38	Sheffield Eagles	17 September 2023, 15:00	Halton Stadium	S. Mikalauskas	2,961
York Knights	15–14	Batley Bulldogs	18 September 2023, 19:45	York Community Stadium	M. Griffiths	2,377

=== Round 27 ===
Betfred Championship: round twenty seven
Home	Score	Away	Match Information
Home	Score	Away	Date and Time	Venue	Referee	Attendance
Batley Bulldogs	32–18	Newcastle Thunder	23 September 2023, 15:00	Fox's Biscuits Stadium	M. Smaill	1,070
Whitehaven	16–26	Toulouse Olympique	23 September 2023, 15:00	Recreation Ground	R. Cox	997
Featherstone Rovers	62–10	Widnes Vikings	23 September 2023, 18:00	Post Office Road	A. Moore	3,874
Barrow Raiders	18–31	York Knights	24 September 2023, 15:00	Craven Park	L. Rush	2,292
Halifax Panthers	12–22	Swinton Lions	24 September 2023, 15:00	The Shay	M. Rossleigh	2,122
London Broncos	24–16	Keighley Cougars	24 September 2023, 15:00	Plough Lane	C. Worsley	1,269
Sheffield Eagles	16–17	Bradford Bulls	24 September 2023, 18:30	Sheffield Olympic Legacy Stadium	M. Griffiths	1,976

== Play-offs ==
=== Team bracket ===
Eliminators
4	Sheffield Eagles	0
5	London Broncos	42
3	Bradford Bulls	22
6	York Knights	8

Semi-finals
1	Featherstone Rovers	26
5	London Broncos	36
2	Toulouse Olympique	38
3	Bradford Bulls	20

Grand Final
2	Toulouse Olympique	14
5	London Broncos	18

=== Week 1: Eliminators ===
1 October 2023
20:00 BST (UTC+01:00)

Sheffield Eagles	0–42	London Broncos
	Report	Tries: Grant 6', 72', Bassett 11', 19', Lovell 65', Walker 43',Williams 39'; Goals: Norman (7/7) 7', 12, 20', 40',44', 66', 73'

Olympic Legacy Park
Attendance: 648
Referee: James Vella

1 October 2023
18:30 BST (UTC+01:00)

Bradford Bulls	22–8	York Knights
Tries: Rogers 35', Appo 37', Holmes 44'; Goals: Lilley (5/5) 36', 38', 45', 62', 67'	Report	Tries: Dee 28'; Goals: Harris (2/2) 14', 29'

Odsal Stadium
Attendance: 2,738
Referee: Tom Grant

=== Week 2: Semi-finals ===
7 October 2023
17:00 BST (UTC+01:00)

Toulouse Olympique	38–20	Bradford Bulls
Tries: Santo, Stefani, Armitage, Laguerre (2), Ralph, Marcon; Goals: Santo, Brochon (4/6)	Report	Tries: Gaskell (2), Appo; Goals: Lilley (4/4)

Stade Ernest Wallon
Attendance: 4,352
Referee: James Vella

8 October 2023
18:30 BST (UTC+01:00)

Featherstone Rovers	26–36	London Broncos
Tries: Hankinson (2), Leilua (2), Briscoe; Goals: Kheirallah (3/5)	Report	Tries: Walker (2), Whare, Macani, Grant, Raiwalui; Goals: Norman (6/6)

Post Office Road
Attendance: 4,324
Referee: Tom Grant

=== Week 3: Grand Final ===
15 October 2023
14:30 BST (UTC+01:00)

Toulouse Olympique	14–18	London Broncos
Tries: Jussaume, Ralph; Goals: Shorrocks (3/3)	Report	Tries: Whare, Walker, Macani (2); Goals: Norman (1/4)

Stade Ernest Wallon
Attendance: 3,974
Referee: Jack Smith
Player of the Match: Alex Walker (London)

Team details
Toulouse Olympique		Position	London Broncos
Name	Number	Position	Number	Name
Zac Santo	22	FB	1	Alex Walker
Paul Marcon	5	WG	4	Dalton Grant
Mathieu Jussaume	4	CE	3	Jarred Bassett
Guy Armitage	18	CE	19	Dean Whare
Benjamin Laguerre	19	WG	5	Iliess Macani
Josh Ralph	6	SO	17	Henry Raiwalui
Jake Shorrocks	7	SH	20	Corey Norman
Maxime Stefani	11	PR	33	Rob Butler
Dominique Peyroux	12	HK	9	Sam Davis
Anthony Marion	13	PF	15	Lewis Bienek
Harrison Hansen	10	SR	11	Will Lovell
Calum Gahan	9	SR	12	Marcus Stock
Lambert Belmas	8	LF	13	Dean Parata
Éloi Pélissier	14	IN	14	Bill Leyland
Sitaleki Akauola	15	IN	10	Jordan Williams
Joe Bretherton	16	IN	8	Wellington Albert
Greg Richards	20	IN	18	Emmanuel Waine
Hugo Pezet	7	CS	6	Oli Leyland
Sylvain Houles		Coach		Mike Eccles
