= 2023 RFL Championship =

Rugby league competition in the United Kingdom

- Duration: 4 February – 15 October 2023
- Teams: 14
- Matches played: 194
- Points scored: 8,875
- Highest attendance: 4,879; Bradford Bulls v Keighley Cougars (2 July 2023)
- Lowest attendance: 684; Newcastle Thunder v Keighley Cougars (18 June 2023)
- Average attendance: 2,012
- Total attendance: 380,375
- Broadcast partners: Viaplay Sports

2023 season
- Promoted to Super League: London Broncos
- League Leaders' Shield: Featherstone Rovers
- Relegated to League One: Newcastle Thunder; Keighley Cougars
- Biggest home win: Featherstone Rovers 76–4 Whitehaven (19 February 2023)
- Biggest away win: Whitehaven 0–60 Featherstone Rovers (2 July 2023)
- Top point-scorer: Cory Aston Sheffield Eagles (182)
- Top try-scorer: Lachlan Walmsley Halifax Panthers (30)

The 2023 RFL Championship, (officially known as the Betfred Championship for sponsorship reasons), was a professional rugby league club competition. Fourteen clubs – thirteen from England and one from France – competed to gain promotion to the 2024 Super League, while avoiding relegation to the 2024 League One season.

The seasons comprised 27 rounds in the regular season with the top six teams taking part in the play-offs.

The champions were London Broncos who after finishing fifth in the regular season, won the play-off grand final against Toulouse Olympique.

Featherstone Rovers won the League Leader's Shield finishing the regular season 12 points ahead of their nearest rivals, Toulouse.

Newcastle Thunder and Keighley Cougars were relegated to League One.

== Teams ==
=== Team changes ===
The following teams changed division since the 2022 season:

==== To Championship ====
Promoted from League One

- Keighley Cougars
- Swinton Lions

Relegated from the Super League

- Toulouse Olympique

==== From Championship ====
Promoted to the Super League

- Leigh Leopards

Relegated to League One

- Dewsbury Rams
- Workington Town

=== Clubs ===
Locations of teams competing in the 2023 Championship.
Locations of the 2023 RFL Championship teams in West Yorkshire
Locations of 2023 RFL Championship teams in France

Team	Location	Stadium	Capacity
Barrow Raiders	Barrow-in-Furness	Matt Johnson Prestige Stadium	6,000
Batley Bulldogs	Batley	Mount Pleasant	7,500
Bradford Bulls	Bradford	Odsal Stadium	22,000
Featherstone Rovers	Featherstone	Millennium Stadium	8,000
Halifax Panthers	Halifax	The Shay	10,401
Keighley Cougars	Keighley	Cougar Park	7,800
London Broncos	Wimbledon	Plough Lane	9,215
Newcastle Thunder	Newcastle upon Tyne	Kingston Park	10,200
Sheffield Eagles	Sheffield	Olympic Legacy Park	1,320
Swinton Lions	Sale	Heywood Road	3,387
Toulouse Olympique	Toulouse	Stade Ernest-Wallon	19,500
Whitehaven	Whitehaven	Recreation Ground	7,500
Widnes Vikings	Widnes	DCBL Stadium	13,350
York Knights	York	York Community Stadium	8,005

== Rule changes ==
Changes in the operational rules were announced on 1 February 2023.

On-field, the main change is that teams awarded a penalty for an offence at a scrum can now kick for goal. Previously such penalties were differential precluding the team from kicking for goal. The green card process has been clarified so that if the referee calls "time off" for a player to receive medical attention, the player must leave the pitch for two minutes. Teams will be allowed to name an 18th player (fifth interchange player) in the squad who can play if three or more players are withdrawn due to failing a head injury assessment (HIA).

Off-field the graduated return to play process that applies after a player has suffered a concussion will be a minimum of 12 days (up from 11 in 2022).

Changes have also been made to the disciplinary process where the periods of suspension for the various grade of offences have been reduced but the use of fines increased.

== Table ==
Pos	Team	Pld	W	D	L	PF	PA	PD	Pts	Qualification
1	Featherstone Rovers	27	25	0	2	1079	295	+784	50	League Leaders Shield and qualify for semi-finals
2	Toulouse Olympique	27	19	0	8	834	385	+449	38	Semi-finals
3	Bradford Bulls	27	16	1	10	677	572	+105	33	Eliminators
4	Sheffield Eagles	27	16	0	11	780	560	+220	32	Eliminators
5	London Broncos	27	16	0	11	600	552	+48	32	Eliminators
6	York Knights	27	15	0	12	557	557	0	30	Eliminators
7	Batley Bulldogs	27	15	0	12	506	519	−13	30	
8	Halifax Panthers	27	14	1	12	690	572	+118	29	
9	Widnes Vikings	27	13	0	14	619	654	−35	26	
10	Swinton Lions	27	9	0	18	426	739	−313	18	
11	Barrow Raiders	27	8	1	18	471	672	−201	17	
12	Whitehaven	27	8	0	19	481	809	−328	16	
13	Keighley Cougars	27	8	0	19	506	837	−331	16	Relegation to League One
14	Newcastle Thunder	27	5	1	21	415	918	−503	11	Relegation to League One

Source: RFL
Rules for classification: 1) Competition points; 2) Points difference; 3) Points percentage (points scored/points conceded x 100)

== Play-offs ==
=== Team bracket ===
Eliminators
4	Sheffield Eagles	0
5	London Broncos	42
3	Bradford Bulls	22
6	York Knights	8

Semi-finals
1	Featherstone Rovers	26
5	London Broncos	36
2	Toulouse Olympique	38
3	Bradford Bulls	20

Grand Final
2	Toulouse Olympique	14
5	London Broncos	18

=== Week 1: Eliminators ===
1 October 2023
20:00 BST (UTC+01:00)

Sheffield Eagles	0–42	London Broncos
	Report	Tries: Grant 6', 72', Bassett 11', 19', Lovell 65', Walker 43',Williams 39'; Goals: Norman (7/7) 7', 12, 20', 40',44', 66', 73'

Olympic Legacy Park
Attendance: 648
Referee: James Vella

1 October 2023
18:30 BST (UTC+01:00)

Bradford Bulls	22–8	York Knights
Tries: Rogers 35', Appo 37', Holmes 44'; Goals: Lilley (5/5) 36', 38', 45', 62', 67'	Report	Tries: Dee 28'; Goals: Harris (2/2) 14', 29'

Odsal Stadium
Attendance: 2,738
Referee: Tom Grant

=== Week 2: Semi-finals ===
7 October 2023
17:00 BST (UTC+01:00)

Toulouse Olympique	38–20	Bradford Bulls
Tries: Santo, Stefani, Armitage, Laguerre (2), Ralph, Marcon; Goals: Santo, Brochon (4/6)	Report	Tries: Gaskell (2), Appo; Goals: Lilley (4/4)

Stade Ernest Wallon
Attendance: 4,352
Referee: James Vella

8 October 2023
18:30 BST (UTC+01:00)

Featherstone Rovers	26–36	London Broncos
Tries: Hankinson (2), Leilua (2), Briscoe; Goals: Kheirallah (3/5)	Report	Tries: Walker (2), Whare, Macani, Grant, Raiwalui; Goals: Norman (6/6)

Post Office Road
Attendance: 4,324
Referee: Tom Grant

=== Week 3: Grand Final ===
15 October 2023
14:30 BST (UTC+01:00)

Toulouse Olympique	14–18	London Broncos
Tries: Jussaume, Ralph; Goals: Shorrocks (3/3)	Report	Tries: Whare, Walker, Macani (2); Goals: Norman (1/4)

Stade Ernest Wallon
Attendance: 3,974
Referee: Jack Smith
Player of the Match: Alex Walker (London)

== Player statistics ==
=== Top 10 try scorers ===
Rank	Player (s)	Club	Tries
1	(Scotland) Lachlan Walmsley	Halifax Panthers	36
2	(England) Gareth Gale	Featherstone Rovers	30
3	(England) Guy Armitage	Toulouse Olympique	22
4	(England) Connor Jones	Featherstone Rovers	21
4	(Jamaica) Ben Jones-Bishop	Sheffield Eagles	21
6	(Scotland) Alex Walker	London Broncos	19
7	(England) Kieran Gill	Bradford Bulls	18
7	(England) Iliess Macani	London Broncos	18
7	(England) Matty Dawson-Jones	Sheffield Eagles	18
10	(Wales) Caleb Aekins	Featherstone Rovers	17
10	(Samoa) Joey Leilua	Featherstone Rovers	17

=== Top 10 goal scorers ===
Rank	Player	Club	Goals
1	(England) Jake Shorrocks	Toulouse Olympique	105
2	(England) Cory Aston	Sheffield Eagles	96
3	(England) Dec Patton	Bradford Bulls	74
4	(England) Ryan Shaw	Barrow Raiders	68
5	(France) Louis Jouffret	Halifax Panthers	62
6	(England) Josh Rourke	Whitehaven RLFC	60
7	(France) Mark Kheirallah	Featherstone Rovers	59
8	(England) Oliver Leyland	London Broncos	58
9	(England) Dan Abram	Swinton Lions	48
10	(New Zealand) Nikau Williams	Newcastle Thunder	44

=== Top 10 points scorers ===
Rank	Player	Club	Points
1	(England) Jake Shorrocks	Toulouse Olympique	226
2	(England) Cory Aston	Sheffield Eagles	224
3	(England) Josh Rourke	Whitehaven RLFC	164
4	(France) Mark Kheirallah	Featherstone Rovers	162
5	(England) Ryan Shaw	Barrow Raiders	160
6	(England) Dec Patton	Bradford Bulls	152
7	(France) Louis Jouffret	Halifax Panthers	149
8	(Scotland) Lachlan Walmsley	Halifax Panthers	144
8	(England) Kieran Dixon	Widnes Vikings	144
10	(England) Oliver Leyland	London Broncos	140

== Discipline ==
=== Red cards ===
Rank	Player	Club	Cards
1	(Malta) Jarrod Sammut	Barrow Raiders	1
1	Brad England	Bradford Bulls	1
1	(Samoa) Jorge Taufua	Bradford Bulls	1
1	(England) Dan Parker	Keighley Cougars	1
1	(England) Matty Laidlaw	Newcastle Thunder	1
1	(England) Vila Halafihi	Sheffield Eagles	1
1	(Tonga) Sitaleki Akauola	Toulouse Olympique	1
1	(England) Aaron Brown	Widnes Vikings	1

=== Yellow cards ===
Rank	Player	Club	Cards
1	(England) George Roby	Bradford Bulls Swinton Lions	4
1	(England) Jay Chapelhow	Newcastle Thunder	4
1	(England) Danny Craven	Widnes Vikings	4
4	(New Zealand) Mitch Clark	Newcastle Thunder	3
4	(Tonga) Sitaleki Akauola	Toulouse Olympique	3
6	(England) Luke Broadbent	Barrow Raiders	2
6	(Papua New Guinea) Keven Appo	Bradford Bulls	2
6	(France) Mark Kheirallah	Featherstone Rovers	2
6	(England) Bradley Gallagher	Newcastle Thunder	2
6	(England) Brandon Douglas	Sheffield Eagles	2
6	(Scotland) Izaac Farrell	Sheffield Eagles	2
6	(England) Vila Halafihi	Sheffield Eagles	2
6	(England) Lewis Hall	Swinton Lions	2
6	(Wales) Rhodri Lloyd	Swinton Lions	2
6	(Wales) Ollie Olds	Swinton Lions	2
6	(France) Maxime Stefani	Toulouse Olympique	2
6	(Italy) Ryan King	Whitehaven RLFC	2
18	77 players	-	1

As of 1 October 2025

== Broadcasting ==
The 2023 Championship season was the second of two seasons televised under a broadcasting deal between the Rugby Football League and Premier Media Broadcasting agreed in October 2021. In late 2022, Viaplay Group acquired Premier Media Broadcasting for £30 million, and subsequently took over operations of Premier Media Broadcasting's channels and rebranded them to Viaplay Sports. Viaplay Group broadcast the Championship's Monday evening games, along with two Summer Bash games and all five play-off games, via their Viaplay Sports channels in the United Kingdom and Ireland. All matches broadcast on Viaplay Sports, including the Championship Grand Final, were broadcast on Fox League in Australia throughout the season.
