= Luis Roberts =

Welsh rugby league footballer (born 2002)

Personal information
- Full name: Luis Roberts
- Born: 24 March 2002 (age 24) Leigh, Greater Manchester, England
- Height: 6 ft 4 in (1.94 m)
- Weight: 15 st 13 lb (101 kg)

Playing information
- Position: Centre, Wing
Club
Years	Team	Pld	T	G	FG	P
2020	Salford Red Devils	2	0	0	0	0
2021	Swinton Lions	19	10	0	0	40
2022	Leigh Centurions	6	0	0	0	0
2022(loan)	→ Widnes Vikings	8	1	0	0	4
2023–24	Leeds Rhinos	24	5	0	0	20
2023(loan)	→ Bradford Bulls	3	1	0	0	4
2025–	Birmingham Hurricanes	34	16	0	0	48
	Total	96	33	0	0	116
Representative
Years	Team	Pld	T	G	FG	P
2022–	Wales	3	0	0	0	0
- Source: As of 21 February 2025

Luis Roberts (born 24 March 2002) is a Wales international rugby league footballer who plays as a centre or winger for the Birmingham Hurricanes in the RFL Championship.

He previously played for Salford Red Devils and Leeds Rhinos in the Super League; and Swinton Lions, Leigh Centurions, Widnes Vikings, and Bradford Bulls in the RFL Championship.

== Background ==
Roberts is of Welsh heritage and has featured for Wales at both junior and senior level.

== Career ==
=== Salford Red Devils ===
Roberts made his Super League debut in round 14 of the 2020 Super League season for Salford Red Devils against the Warrington Wolves. Roberts also featured in a one-off match for new expansion club Valencia Hurricanes in a loss to Featherstone Rovers.

=== Swinton Lions ===
On 10 September 2020, it was announced that Roberts would join Swinton Lions for the 2021 season in the RFL Championship. He was nominated for the 2021 Championship Young Player of the Year award.

=== Leigh Centurions ===
On 28 October 2021, it was reported that he had signed for Leigh Centurions in the 2022 RFL Championship.

=== Widnes Vikings (loan) ===
On 23 June 2022, it was announced that he would join Widnes Vikings on loan in the RFL Championship for the remainder of the 2022 season.

=== Leeds Rhinos ===
On 18 October 2022, Roberts joined Super League side Leeds Rhinos for the 2023 season, signing a two-year contract. Roberts has also made a number of appearances for Bradford Bulls in the RFL championship on dual registration in 2023.

=== Birmingham Hurricanes ===
On 21 Feb 2025 it was reported that he had signed for Birmingham Hurricanes in the RFL League 1 on a 1-year deal. On 18 July 2025 it was reported Roberts had signed a contract extension that will see him remain at the club until the end of the 2026 season in the RFL Championship. On 15 Oct 2026 it was reported Roberts had signed a contract extension that would keep him at the club until the end of the 2028 season in the RFL championship.
