= Fenton Rogers =

English rugby league footballer

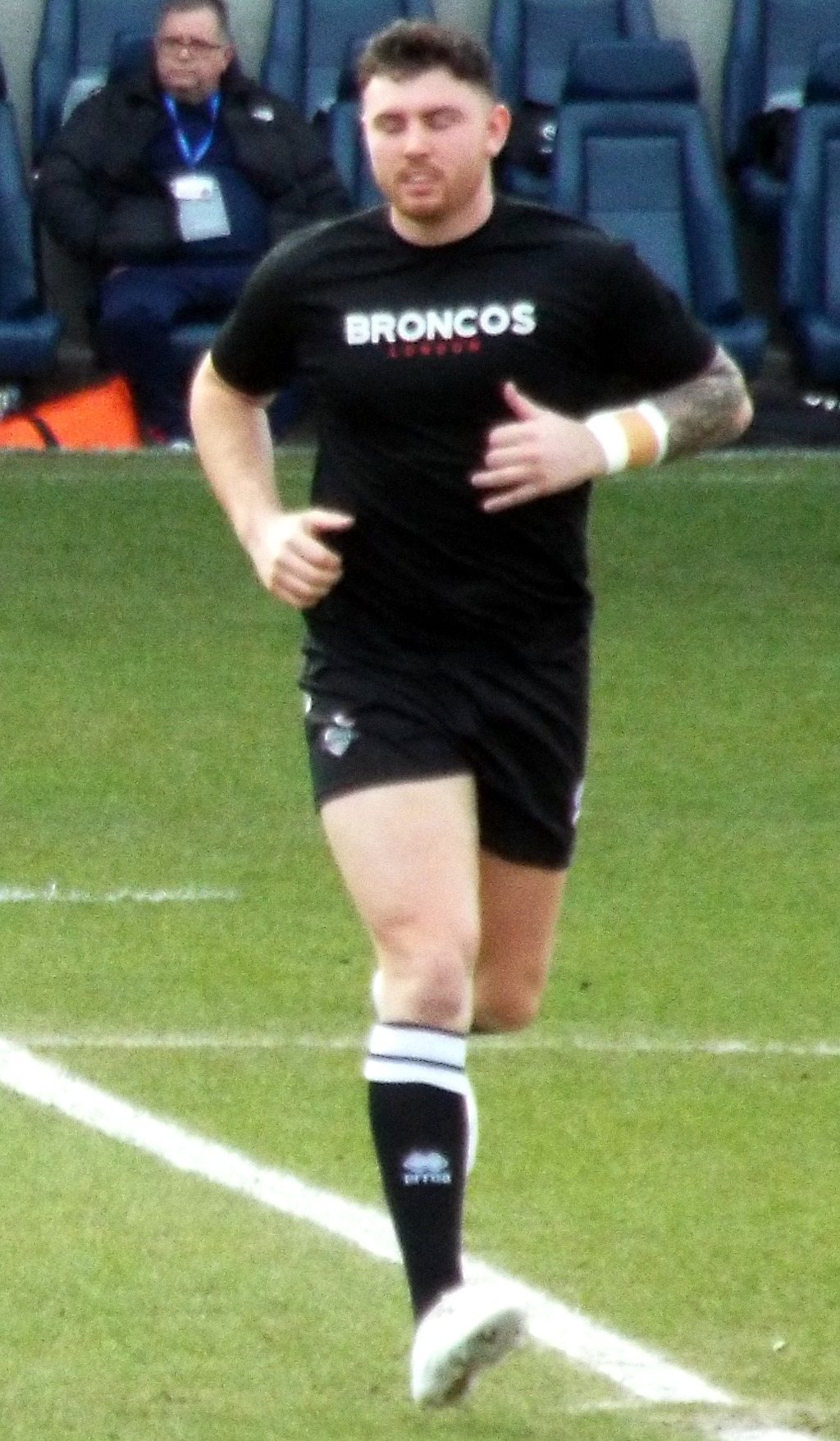

Personal information
- Full name: Fenton Rogers
- Born: 4 August 2003 (age 23) Oldham, Greater Manchester, England
- Height: 6 ft 3 in (1.91 m)
- Weight: 17 st 2 lb (109 kg)

Playing information
- Position: Prop
Club
Years	Team	Pld	T	G	FG	P
2021–	Huddersfield Giants	25	1	0	0	4
2021(loan)	→ Oldham	1	0	0	0	0
2022(loan)	→ Rochdale Hornets	10	3	0	0	12
2022(loan)	→ Halifax Panthers	1	0	0	0	0
2023–24(loan)	→ Bradford Bulls	38	4	0	0	16
2024(loan)	→ London Broncos	3	0	0	0	0
2024 (loan)	→ Bradford Bulls	12	0	0	0	0
2025(loan)	→ Bradford Bulls	2	0	0	0	0
	Total	92	8	0	0	32
- Source: As of 14 September 2026

Fenton Rogers (born 4 August 2003) is an English professional rugby league footballer who plays as a prop for the Huddersfield Giants in the Super League.

He has previously spent time on loan from Huddersfield at the Halifax Panthers, Oldham RLFC and the Bradford Bulls in the Championship, as well as the Rochdale Hornets in League 1.

== Background ==
Rogers was born in Oldham, Greater Manchester, England. He is the son of former professional rugby league footballer Wes Rogers.

He played for Saddleworth Rangers and Lancashire as a junior.

== Playing career ==
=== Huddersfield Giants ===
Rogers came through the Giants' Academy system. He signed a three-year deal in July 2023. In the final round of the 2026 Super League season, Rogers was given a straight red card for using a raised elbow on Castleford's Tyler Dupree. Rogers was later suspended for two games.

=== Oldham ===
He spent time on loan from Huddersfield at Oldham in the Championship.

=== Rochdale Hornets ===
He spent time on loan from Huddersfield at the Rochdale Hornets in League 1.

=== Halifax Panthers ===
He spent time on loan from Huddersfield at the Halifax Panthers in the Championship.

=== Bradford Bulls ===
He spent time on loan from Huddersfield at the Bradford Bulls in the Championship.

=== London Broncos ===
He joined the London Broncos on loan in 2024.

=== Bradford Bulls (loan) ===
On 4 April 2024 it was reported that he had signed for Bradford Bulls in the RFL Championship on loan

=== Bradford Bulls (loan) ===
On 9 July 2025 it was reported that he had signed for Bradford Bulls in the RFL Championship on a third loan stint
