= Jack Bibby =

English rugby league footballer

Personal information
- Full name: Jack Bibby
- Born: 14 October 2001 (age 24) Bolton, Lancashire, England

Playing information
- Position: Prop
Club
Years	Team	Pld	T	G	FG	P
2021–22	Wigan Warriors	2	1	0	0	4
2021(loan)	→ Oldham RLFC	2	1	0	0	4
2022(loan)	→ Whitehaven RLFC	1	0	0	0	0
2022(loan)	→ Workington Town	3	0	0	0	0
2022(loan)	→ Oldham RLFC	2	0	0	0	0
2023–25	Huddersfield Giants	9	1	0	0	4
2023(loan)	→ Bradford Bulls	3	0	0	0	0
2023(loan)	→ Keighley Cougars	13	1	0	0	4
2024(DR)	→ Dewsbury Rams	12	0	0	0	0
2025(loan)	→ Widnes Vikings	6	0	0	0	0
2026	Widnes Vikings	5	0	0	0	0
2026–	Salford RLFC	13	4	0	0	16
	Total	71	8	0	0	32
- Source: As of 7 July 2026

Jack Bibby (born 14 October 2001) is a professional rugby league player who plays as a prop for the Salford RLFC in the RFL Championship.

== Playing career ==
=== Wigan Warriors ===
He previously played for the Wigan Warriors in the Super League and spent time on loan from Wigan at Oldham in the Championship and League 1, as well as Workington Town in League 1.

In August 2022 Bibby made his Super League début for the Warriors against Hull Kingston Rovers.

=== Huddersfield Giants ===
In October 2022 Bibby joined the Huddersfield Giants on a three-year deal. and he made a try scoring debut in an 18-16 defeat by Salford Red Devils

=== Widnes Vikings (loan) ===
On 5 August 2025 it was reported that he had signed for Widnes Vikings in the RFL Championship on loan until the end of the 2025 season

=== Widnes Vikings ===
On 22 October 2025 it was reported that he had signed for Widnes Vikings in the RFL Championship on a permanent deal

=== Salford RLFC ===
On 20 March 2026 it was reported that he had signed for Salford RLFC in the RFL Championship
