= Aaron Brown (rugby league) =

English rugby league footballer

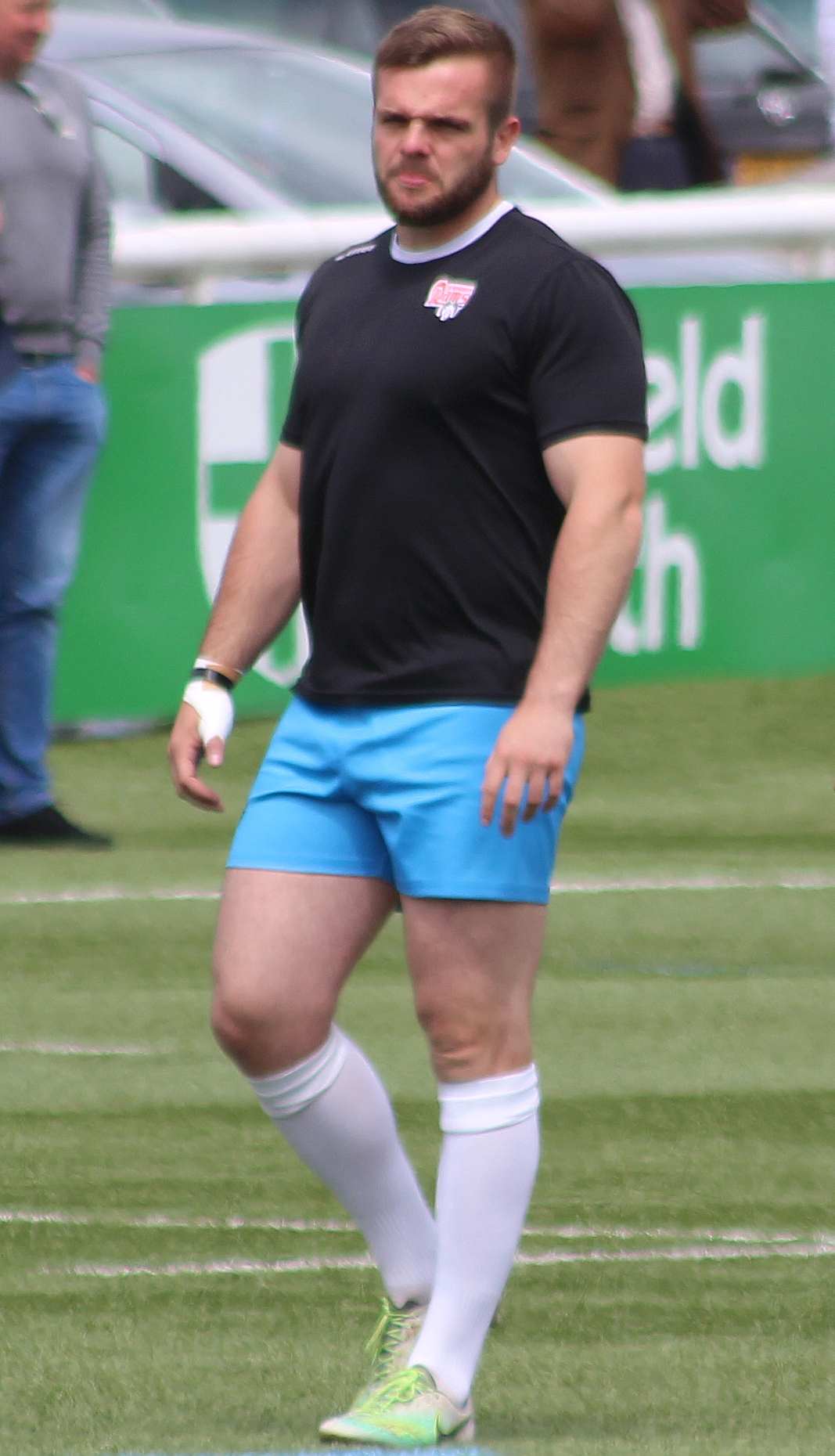

Personal information
- Full name: Aaron Brown
- Born: 27 July 1992 (age 34) Oldham, Greater Manchester, England
- Height: 5 ft 10 in (1.78 m)
- Weight: 14 st 0 lb (89 kg)

Playing information
- Position: Hooker, Loose forward, Second-row
Club
Years	Team	Pld	T	G	FG	P
2013–18	Dewsbury Rams	142	49	0	0	196
2019–21	Sheffield Eagles	60	18	0	0	72
2022–23	Widnes Vikings	35	3	0	0	12
2024–	Keighley Cougars	41	4	0	0	16
	Total	278	74	0	0	296
- Source: As of 25 October 2026

Aaron Brown (born 27 July 1992) is a professional rugby league footballer who plays as a hooker, second-row or loose forward for the Keighley Cougars in the RFL Championship.

== Playing career ==
=== Dewsbury Rams ===
Brown signed for the Dewsbury Rams in October 2012 having previously being named as the Leeds Rhinos U20 player of the year.

=== Sheffield Eagles ===
In October 2018 Brown joined Sheffield Eagles on a two-year deal. He helped the Eagles by scoring a hat-trick of tries, to win the inaugural 1895 Cup as they defeated Widnes Vikings 36–18 in the final.

=== Widnes Vikings ===
In October 2021 Brown signed for Widnes Vikings for the 2022 season.

=== Keighley Cougars ===
Brown joined Keighley Cougars in the RFL League 1 in October 2023.
