= George Flanagan =

English professional rugby league footballer

Personal information
- Full name: George Flanagan
- Born: 8 October 1986 (age 40) Bradford, West Yorkshire, England
- Height: 5 ft 11 in (1.80 m)
- Weight: 14 st 5 lb (91 kg)

Playing information
- Position: Hooker
Club
Years	Team	Pld	T	G	FG	P
2009–11	Batley Bulldogs	22	13	30	0	112
2012	Dewsbury Rams	16	8	0	0	32
2013	Batley Bulldogs	30	14	0	1	57
2014	Featherstone Rovers	19	5	0	0	20
2015–18	Hunslet	69	47	2	0	192
2015 (loan)	→ Hemel Stags	2	1	0	0	4
2018–24	Bradford Bulls	107	40	1	2	164
2024 (d/r)	→ Rochdale Hornets	2	0	0	0	0
2024–	Keighley Cougars	53	19	1	0	78
	Total	320	147	34	3	659
- Source: As of 26 August 2024

George Flanagan (born 8 October 1986) is an English professional rugby league footballer who plays as a hooker for the Keighley Cougars in the [RFL Championship].

== Personal life ==
Flanagan was born in Bradford, West Yorkshire, England.

He has a son, George Flanagan Jr. who is also a rugby league footballer. Flanagan Jr. played alongside his father at the Bradford Bulls, making his first-team debut in July 2022 in a match against the London Broncos. The two went on to play against each other for the first time when Keighley met Hunslet in August 2024.

== Career ==
=== Bradford Bulls ===
Flanagan started his career coming through the ranks at the Bradford Bulls through their academy system.

In 2018 Flanagan signed a two-year deal to play for his hometown club leaving Hunslet R.L.F.C. one game into the 2018 League 1 season. He scored 14 tries for the Bradford Bulls in the 2019 season, helping them earn promotion through the playoffs back to the Championship. He scored one of his famous 'show n go' tries in the playoff final to further extend Bradford's lead in the 35th minute against former player Leon Pryce's Workington Town, who had previously done the double over Bradford in the regular season.

Flanagan has received a £250 fine and an eight-game ban for an "attack to the testicles" against Hakim Miloudi during a Championship game on 4 August 2019. He has received another £250 fine and a ten-game ban for the same attack made during a Challenge Cup game on 21 March 2021. Following this second ban, Flanagan has shared his mental health struggles, stating that he was "enduring the toughest period of his career", and has temporarily walked away from social media due to the backlash on social media over the ban.

=== Keighley Cougars ===
On 7 May 2024 Flanagan signed for Keighley Cougars in the RFL League 1 on loan, following a period at Rochdale Hornets under the dual registration agreement between Bradford and Rochdale. This move was made permanent later in the season.
