= George Flanagan Jr =

English rugby league footballer

Personal information
- Full name: George Flanagan Jr
- Born: 4 December 2004 (age 21)

Playing information
- Position: Fullback, Scrum-half, Stand-off
Club
Years	Team	Pld	T	G	FG	P
2022–23	Bradford Bulls	3	2	4	0	16
2024	Hunslet	13	8	1	0	34
2025–	Huddersfield Giants	25	10	44	0	128
	Total	41	20	49	0	178
- Source: As of 19 October 2025

George Flanagan Jr (born 4 December 2004) is an English professional rugby league footballer who plays as a fullback, scrum-half or stand-off for the Huddersfield Giants in the Super League.

== Career ==
=== Bradford Bulls ===
Flanagan made a try-scoring debut for Bradford Bulls against London Broncos in July 2022, a game in which his father, George Flanagan Sr, also played.

=== Huddersfield Giants ===
Flanagan Jr. made his debut in round 2 of the 2025 Super League season for the Giants against the Leigh Leopards in a 24-10 loss.

In April 2025 Flanagan Jr signed a new contract with the Giants which will keep him there until 2027.
