= Josh Johnson (rugby league) =

English rugby league footballer

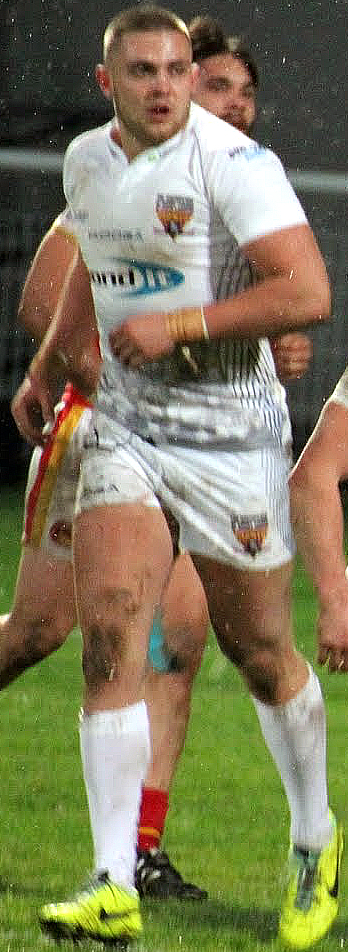

Personal information
- Full name: Joshua Johnson
- Born: 25 July 1994 (age 31) Oldham England
- Height: 6 ft 1 in (1.86 m)
- Weight: 16 st 3 lb (103 kg)

Playing information
- Position: Prop
Club
Years	Team	Pld	T	G	FG	P
2013–16	Huddersfield Giants	36	0	0	0	0
2013(DR)	→ Doncaster	3	0	0	0	0
2013(loan)	→ Batley Bulldogs	12	0	0	0	0
2014(loan)	→ Batley Bulldogs	9	0	0	0	0
2015(DR)	→ Oldham	4	2	0	0	8
2017–19	Hull Kingston Rovers	19	0	0	0	0
2018(DR)	→ York City Knights	6	1	0	0	4
2018(loan)	→ Leigh Centurions	7	0	0	0	0
2019	Barrow Raiders	22	3	0	0	12
2019–22	Salford Red Devils	13	1	0	0	4
2022(loan)	→ Barrow Raiders	1	0	0	0	0
2022	Widnes Vikings	7	0	0	0	0
2023	Bradford Bulls	11	0	0	0	0
2023–24	Oldham RLFC	0	0	0	0	0
	Total	150	7	0	0	28
- Source: As of 30 June 2023

Joshua Johnson (born 25 July 1994) is an English professional rugby league footballer who most recently played as a prop for the Oldham RLFC in the RFL League 1.

He has previously played for the Huddersfield Giants in the Super League, and on loan from Huddersfield at Doncaster and the Batley Bulldogs in the Championship, and Oldham in Championship 1. Johnson played for Hull Kingston Rovers in the Kingstone Press Championship and in the top flight, and on loan from Hull KR at the York City Knights in Betfred League 1 and the Leigh Centurions in the Betfred Championship. He also played for the Barrow Raiders in the Championship.

== Background ==
Johnson was born in Oldham, Greater Manchester, England. Johnson has previously played for the Saddleworth Rangers.

== Senior career ==
=== Huddersfield Giants (2013-16) ===
Johnson made his Huddersfield Giants' Super League début on 4 August 2013, in a match against the Salford Red Devils at the John Smiths Stadium.

=== Doncaster R.L.F.C. (2013) ===
Johnson's senior rugby league début came during a dual-registration spell at part-timers Doncaster R.L.F.C. in the 2013 season.

=== Batley Bulldogs (2013-14) ===
In 2013 and 2014, Johnson also played as part of a loan deal with Championship club Batley.

=== Oldham (2015) ===
The 2015 season saw Johnson play for the OLdham on a dual-registration basis.

=== 2017 ===
Johnson made his Hull Kingston Rovers' début on 2 April 2017, in a 50-16 Championship league victory.

Johnson was part of the Hull Kingston Rovers side that won promotion back to the Super League, at the first time of asking following relegation the season prior.

=== 2018-19 ===
Struggling for regular game time during the 2018 Super League season and with no promise of that changing during the 2019 campaign, it was revealed on 25 January 2019, that Johnson had been released from his contract (to seek regular game time elsewhere) at Hull Kingston Rovers by mutual consent.

=== York City Knights (2018) ===
Johnson also featured for York City on several occasions during the 2018 season, as part of Hull Kingston Rovers dual-registration agreement with the club.

=== Leigh Centurions (2018) ===
It was revealed on 26 July 2018, that Johnson would spend the remainder of the 2018 rugby league season at Leigh, on a loan basis from his parent-club Hull Kingston Rovers. Johnson was followed to Leigh by two of his current Hull Kingston Rovers teammates in Will Dagger and Jordan Walne as part of the same loan deal.

=== Barrow Raiders ===
It was revealed on 31 January 2019, that Johnson had signed a deal to join the Barrow Raiders on a one-year contract, that included a release clause should he receive a full-time offer from another club. Johnson made his début for Barrow on 3 February 2019, in a 18–22 victory over Batley.

=== Oldham RLFC ===
On 29 June 2023 it was reported that Johnson had left Bradford Bulls by mutual consent to join Oldham RLFC for personal reasons.
