= Jordan Lilley =

English rugby league footballer

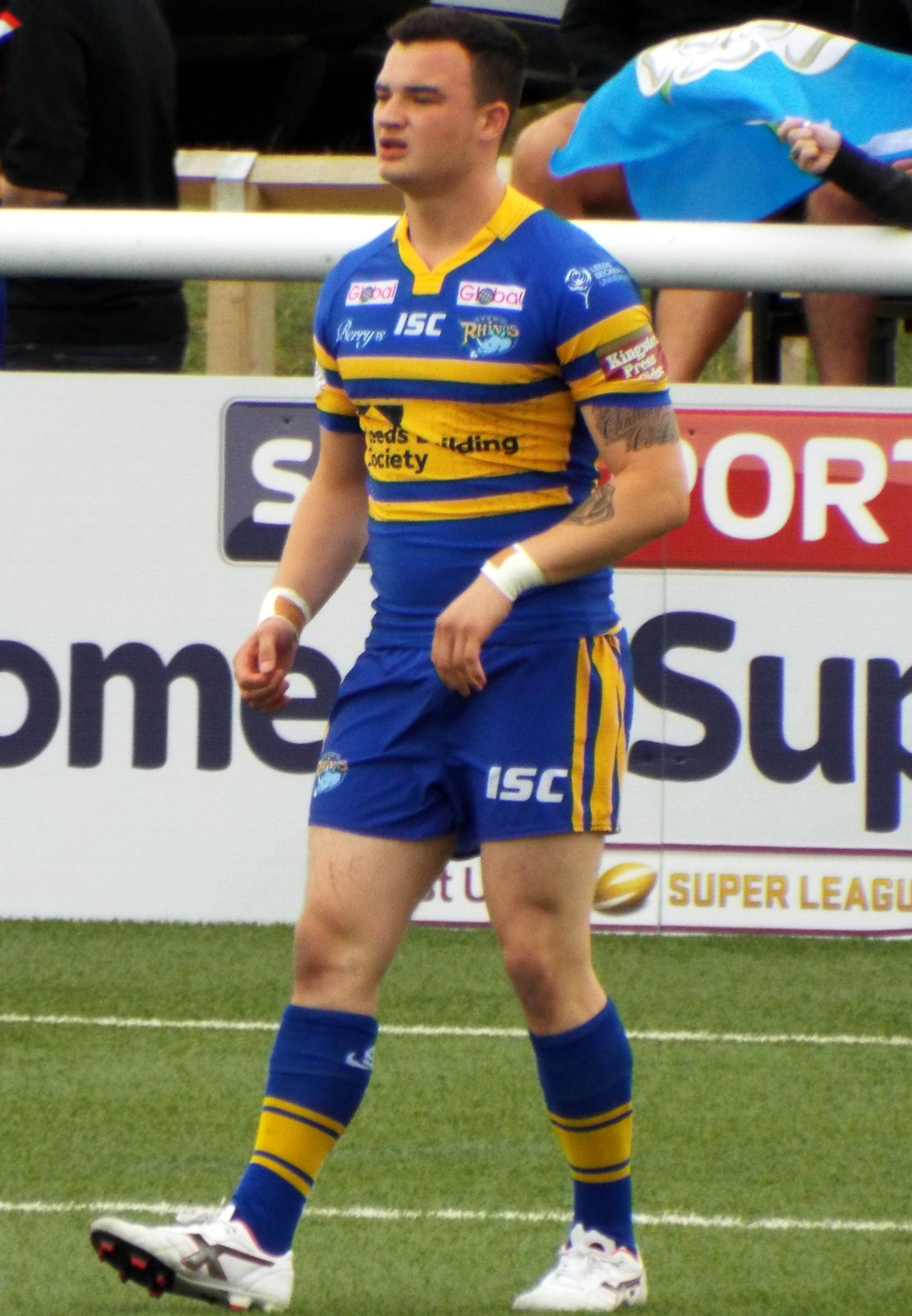

Personal information
- Full name: Jordan Sam Lilley
- Born: 4 September 1996 (age 29) Bramley, Leeds, West Yorkshire, England
- Height: 5 ft 9 in (1.75 m)
- Weight: 11 st 3 lb (71 kg)

Playing information
- Position: Stand-off, Scrum-half
Club
Years	Team	Pld	T	G	FG	P
2015–19	Leeds Rhinos	41	4	64	0	144
2015(loan)	→ Hunslet	4	0	10	0	20
2016(loan)	→ Featherstone Rovers	3	2	3	1	15
2017(loan)	→ Bradford Bulls	12	0	5	0	10
2018(loan)	→ Leigh Centurions	1	0	3	0	6
2018(loan)	→ Featherstone Rovers	2	0	0	0	0
2018(loan)	→ Bradford Bulls	10	2	4	0	16
2019–25	Bradford Bulls	164	33	253	15	653
2026–	Sheffield Eagles	8	1	28	1	61
	Total	245	42	370	17	925
- Source: As of 22 March 2026

Jordan Lilley (born 4 September 1996) is an English professional rugby league footballer who plays as a stand-off or scrum-half for the Sheffield Eagles in the Championship.

He spent on loan from the Leeds Rhinos at Bradford during the 2019 season.

== Background ==
Lilley was born in Bramley, Leeds, West Yorkshire, England.

== Career ==
=== Early career ===
Lilley started at the amateur club Stanningley ARLFC.

=== Leeds Rhinos ===
Lilley made his début for Leeds in their 2015 Super League match against Wakefield Trinity at Belle Vue. He went on to make a handful of appearances in 2015 and just missed out on a spot in the Grand Final team at the end of the season. In 2016 Lilley became a regular in the Leeds team after Danny McGuire was injured at the start of the season.

==== Hunslet ====
Lilley was dual registered in 2015 with Hunslet Hawks in the Championship, and played four games for the club, kicking ten goals.

==== Bradford Bulls ====
He joined Bradford on a loan deal in February 2017.

==== Leigh Centurions ====
In March 2018 Lilley joined Leigh on a month loan.

=== Bradford Bulls ===
He rejoined Bradford on a year and a half loan deal before signing permanently on a two-year deal midway through the 2019 season.

=== Sheffield Eagles ===
On 22 October 2025 it was reported that he had signed a 2-year deal to join Sheffield Eagles in the RFL Championship

==== Statistics ====
Statistics do not include pre-season friendlies.

Season	Appearance	Tries	Goals	F/G	Points
2017 Bradford Bulls	12	0	5	0	10
2018 Bradford Bulls	10	2	4	0	16
2019 Bradford Bulls	27	4	11	3	41
2020 Bradford Bulls	6	3	1	0	14
2021 Bradford Bulls	18	6	20	2	66
2022 Bradford Bulls	17	2	0	2	10
2023 Bradford Bulls	21	1	2	0	8
Total	111	18	43	7	165

== Honours ==
World Club Challenge Runners-up: 2016
