= Maxime Stefani =

France international rugby league footballer

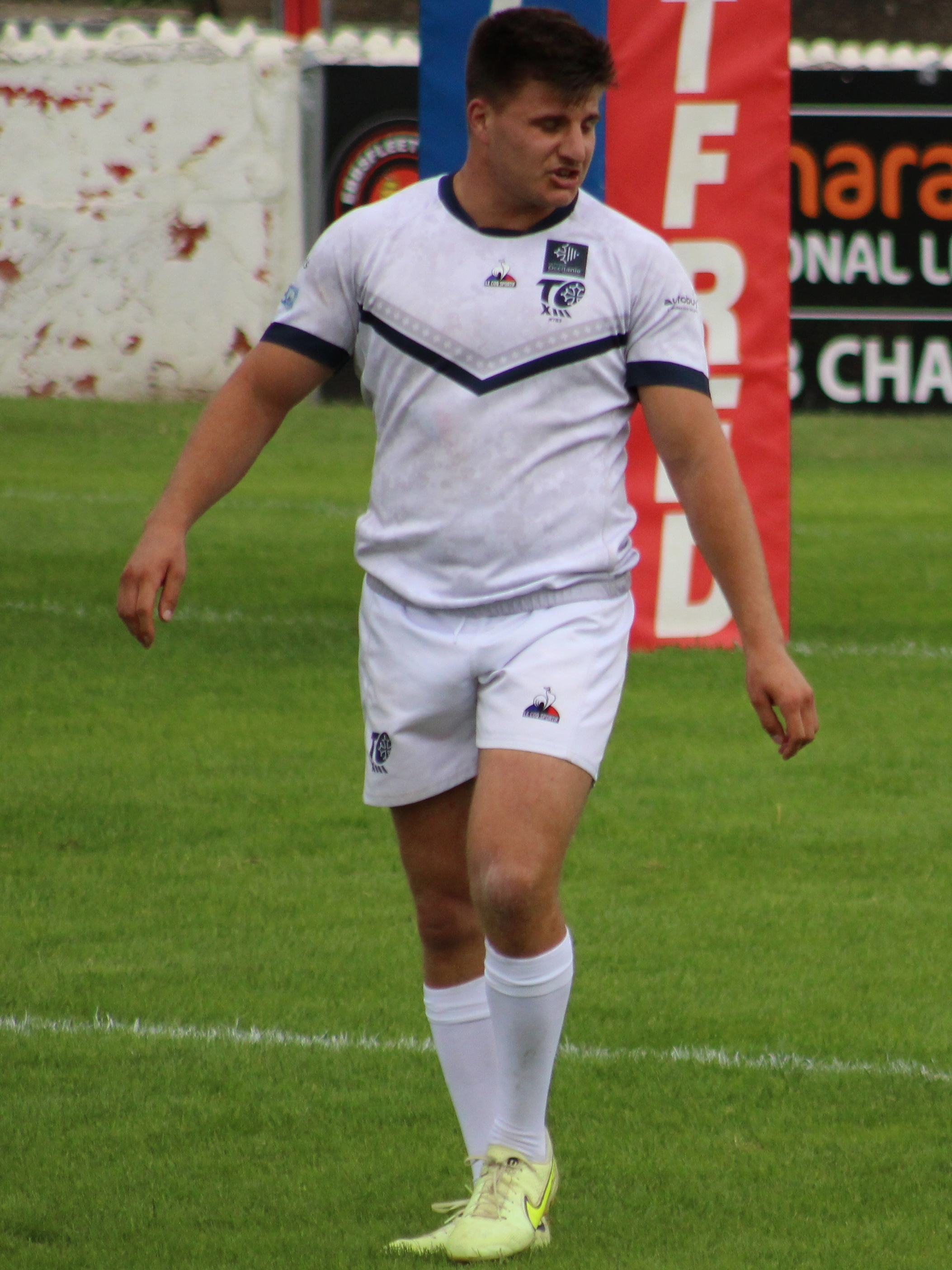

Personal information
- Full name: Maxime Stefani
- Born: 10 March 1998 (age 28) Saint-Gaudens, Haute-Garonne, Occitania, France
- Height: 6 ft 0 in (1.82 m)
- Weight: 14 st 11 lb (94 kg)

Playing information
- Position: Second-row
Club
Years	Team	Pld	T	G	FG	P
2016–21	Saint-Gaudens Bears	80	31	0	0	124
2022–	Toulouse Olympique	72	32	0	0	128
	Total	152	63	0	0	252
Representative
Years	Team	Pld	T	G	FG	P
2022–	France B	1	0	0	0	0
2022–	France	2	0	0	0	0
- Source: As of 13 October 2026

Maxime Stefani (born 10 March 1998) is a French professional rugby league footballer who plays as a second-row forward for Toulouse Olympique in the Super League and France at international level.

He previously played for the Saint-Gaudens Bears.

In February 2022 Stefani made his Toulouse début in the Super League against the Warrington Wolves, scoring a try on debut.

In October 2022 he was named in the France squad for the 2021 Rugby League World Cup.

His younger brother, Mattéo, has also played rugby league for Toulouse.
