= Kieran Gill =

English rugby league footballer

Personal information
- Born: 4 December 1995 (age 29) England
- Height: 6 ft 3 in (190 cm)
- Weight: 14 st 10 lb (93.3 kg)

Playing information
- Position: Centre, Wing
Club
Years	Team	Pld	T	G	FG	P
2016–19	Castleford Tigers	4	4	0	0	16
2016(loan)	→ Oxford RL	4	1	0	0	4
2016(loan)	→ Oldham R.L.F.C.	12	8	0	0	32
2017(loan)	→ Oldham R.L.F.C.	9	5	0	0	20
2018(loan)	→ Oldham R.L.F.C.	3	2	0	0	8
2018(loan)	→ Newcastle Thunder	1	1	0	0	4
2019(loan)	→ Newcastle Thunder	23	28	0	0	112
2020–21	Newcastle Thunder	20	19	0	0	76
2022–25	Bradford Bulls	111	75	0	0	300
2025(loan)	→ Batley Bulldogs	1	2	0	0	8
2026–	Sheffield Eagles	0	0	0	0	0
	Total	188	145	0	0	580
- Source: As of 21 October 2025

Kieran Gill (born 4 December 1995) is a rugby league footballer who plays as centre or wing for Sheffield Eagles in the RFL Championship.

== Playing career ==
=== Castleford Tigers ===
He spent the 2019 season on-loan from the Castleford Tigers at Newcastle. Gill has previously played on loan for Oxford, Oldham and the Newcastle Thunder.

=== Bradford Bulls ===
On 22 September 2021, it was reported that he had signed for Bradford in the RFL Championship

On 20 October 2025 it was reported that he had left Bradford Bulls

=== Batley Bulldogs (loan) ===
On 27 June 2025 it was reported that he had signed for Batley Bulldogs in the RFL Championship on 2-week loan

=== Sheffield Eagles ===
On 21 October 2025 it was reported that he had signed for Sheffield Eagles in the RFL Championship on 2-year deal
