= Declan Patton =

English professional rugby league footballer

Dec Patton
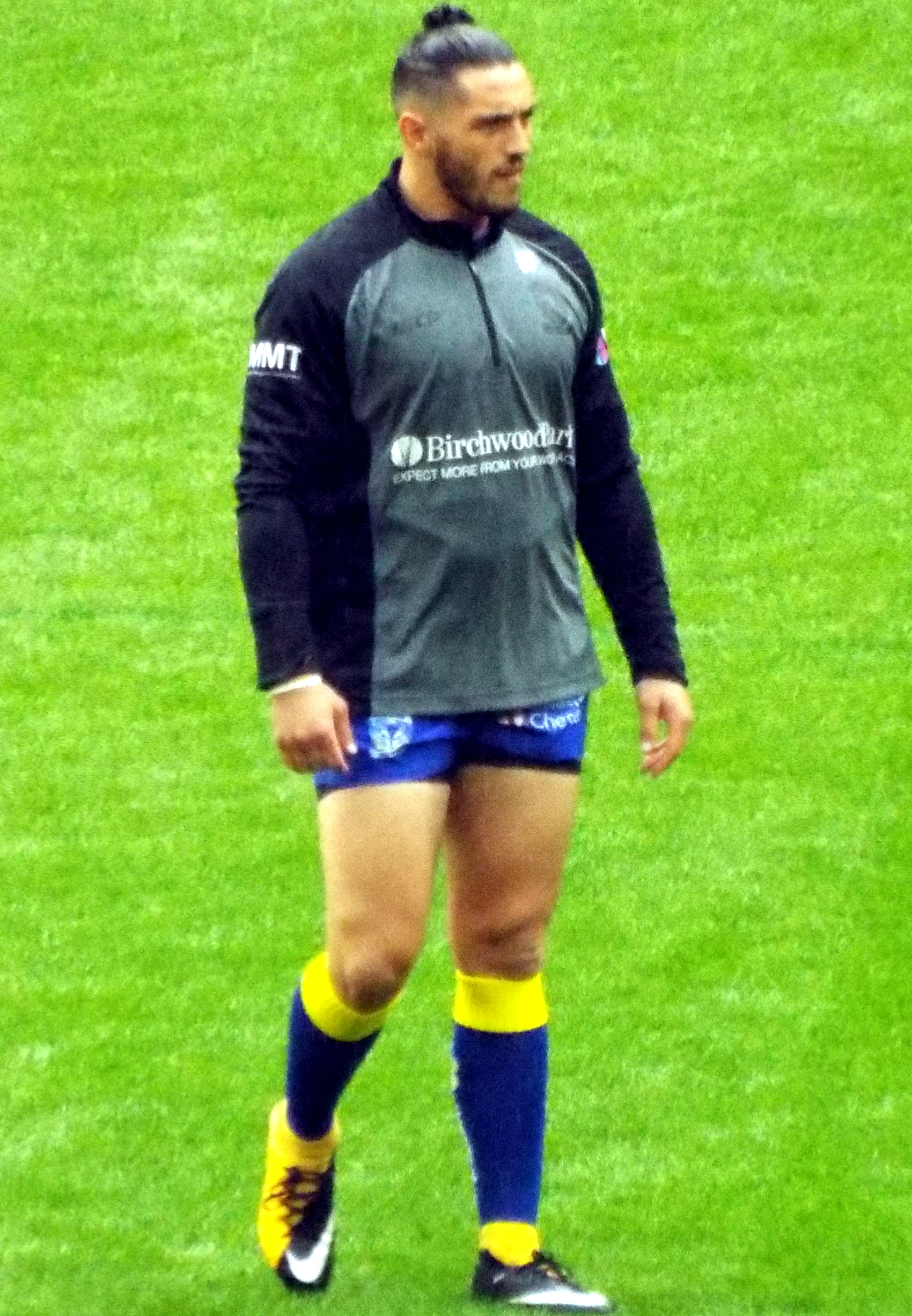

Personal information
- Full name: Declan Patton
- Born: 23 May 1995 (age 31) Warrington, Cheshire, England
- Height: 5 ft 8 in (1.73 m)
- Weight: 13 st 10 lb (87 kg)

Playing information
- Position: Scrum-half, Stand-off, Hooker
Club
Years	Team	Pld	T	G	FG	P
2015–21	Warrington Wolves	108	16	142	7	355
2015(loan)	→ North Wales Crusaders	1	0	0	0	0
2016(loan)	→ Rochdale Hornets	1	0	0	0	0
2018(loan)	→ Rochdale Hornets	2	0	1	1	3
2020(loan)	→ Widnes Vikings	2	0	0	0	0
2021	Salford Red Devils	11	2	3	0	14
2022–23	Bradford Bulls	46	4	164	0	344
2024	Swinton Lions	14	1	41	0	86
2024	Featherstone Rovers	8	1	15	0	34
2025	Widnes Vikings	17	1	14	0	32
2026–	North Wales Crusaders	11	1	40	0	84
	Total	221	26	420	8	952
Representative
Years	Team	Pld	T	G	FG	P
2018–	England Knights	2	0	5	0	10
- Source: As of 6 November 2026

Declan Patton (born 23 May 1995) is a rugby league footballer who plays as a scrum-half, stand-off or hooker for the North Wales Crusaders and the England Knights at international level.

He previously played for the Warrington Wolves in the Super League, and on loan from Warrington at the Rochdale Hornets in League 1 and the Championship, and also the Widnes Vikings in the Championship.

== Background ==
Patton was born in Warrington, Cheshire, England.

== Playing career ==
=== Warrington ===
Patton made his début in 2015 against Wakefield Trinity.

He moved to Warrington in 2015 after being signed from Leigh. He mainly played reserve matches eventually making his way into the starting squad due to injuries.
He has spent time on loan at Rochdale in League 1 and the Championship.

He played in the 20-6 win v Hull FC to secure the 2016 League Leaders' Shield. Since then Patton began to make a big impression scoring important tries and helping Warrington win many games throughout the season. Patton played in the 2016 Super League Grand Final against Wigan. He scored Warrington's only try putting them 6–2 up. However Wigan came back and won 12–6 at Old Trafford. Patton played in the 2018 Challenge Cup Final defeat by the Catalans Dragons at Wembley Stadium. Patton played in the 2018 Super League Grand Final defeat by Wigan at Old Trafford. Patton played in the 2019 Challenge Cup Final victory over St Helens at Wembley Stadium.

=== Salford ===
On 22 January 2021, it was reported that he had signed for Salford in the Super League.

=== Bradford ===
On 3 February 2022, it was reported that Patton had signed for RFL Championship side Bradford Bulls.

=== Swinton Lions ===
On 22 October 2023 it was reported he will join Swinton Lions for 2024.

=== Featherstone Rovers ===
On 21 June 2024 it was reported that he had signed for Featherstone Rovers in the RFL Championship

=== North Wales Crusaders ===
On 15 September 2025 it was reported that he had signed for North Wales Crusaders

== International career ==
In 2018 he was selected for the England Knights on their tour of Papua New Guinea. He played against Papua New Guinea at the Lae Football Stadium and the Oil Search National Football Stadium.
