= Tom Holmes (rugby league) =

English rugby league footballer

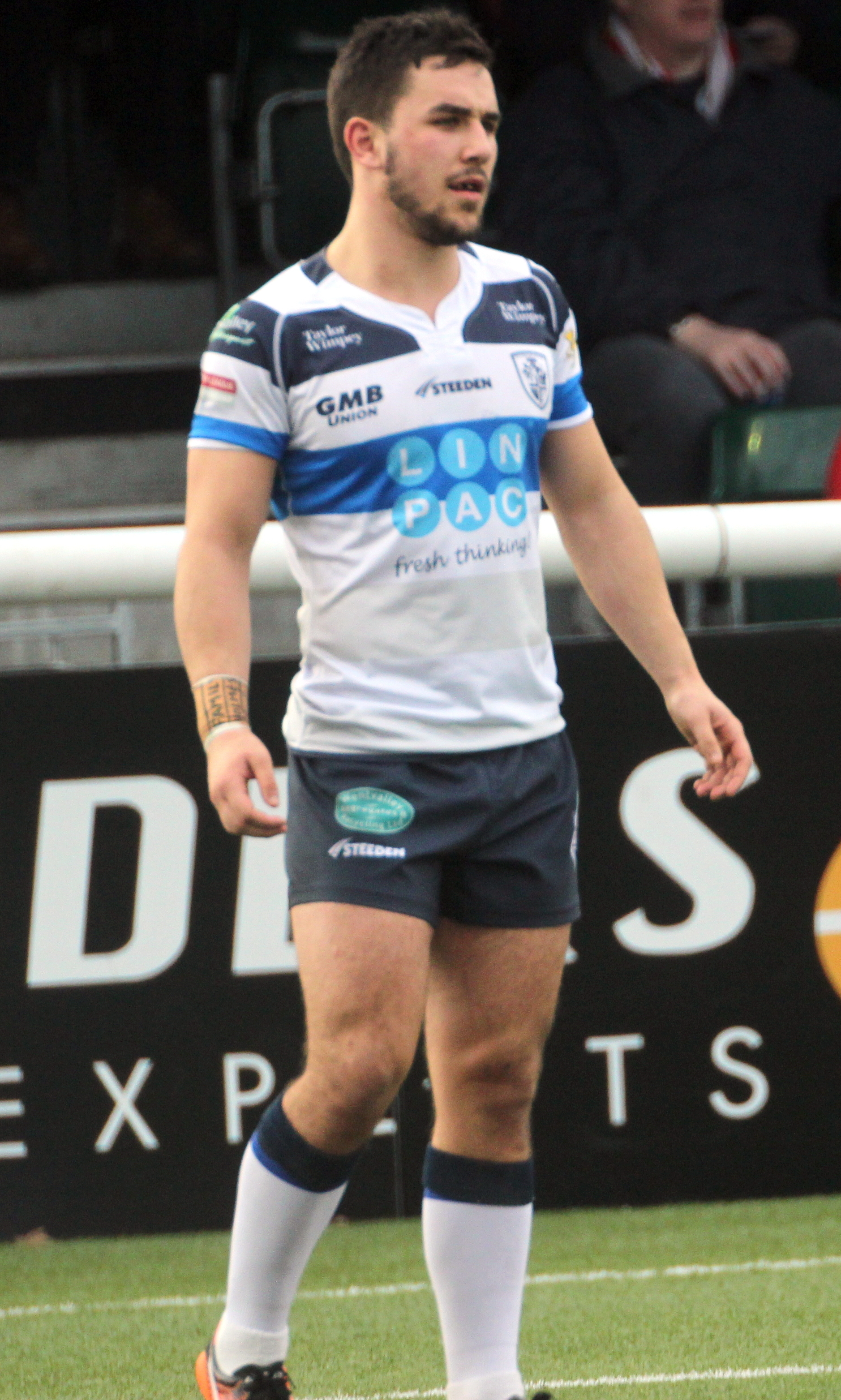

Personal information
- Full name: Thomas Holmes
- Born: 2 March 1996 (age 30) Castleford, West Yorkshire, England
- Height: 5 ft 10 in (1.77 m)
- Weight: 13 st 5 lb (85 kg)

Playing information
- Position: Scrum-half, Stand-off, Hooker
Club
Years	Team	Pld	T	G	FG	P
2014–18	Castleford Tigers	21	4	0	0	16
2016(loan)	→ Oxford	7	3	1	0	12
2017(loan)	→ Batley Bulldogs	8	3	0	0	12
2018–19	Featherstone Rovers	18	5	0	0	20
2019–21	Huddersfield Giants	19	0	0	0	0
2019(loan)	→ Featherstone Rovers	7	3	0	0	12
2021–22	Featherstone Rovers	20	5	0	0	20
2022(loan)	→ Sheffield Eagles	23	7	18	0	64
2023–25	Bradford Bulls	68	31	0	0	124
2026–	Doncaster	11	10	0	0	40
	Total	202	71	19	0	320
- Source: As of 21 April 2026

Tom Holmes (born 2 March 1996) is an English rugby league footballer who plays as a scrum-half or stand-off for Doncaster in the Championship.

He played for the Castleford Tigers in the Super League, enjoying loan spells to the Batley Bulldogs in the Championship and Oxford in League 1. He spent the 2018 season at Featherstone in the Championship, before moving to the Huddersfield Giants in the Super League, returning to Post Office Road on loan from Huddersfield in 2019.

== Background ==
Holmes was born in Castleford, West Yorkshire, England.

== Personal life ==
Holmes was diagnosed with an extremely rare form of cancer on 5 January 2024, after noticing a rapid decline in health towards the end of last season. He recovered from the illness, and resumed playing rugby in April 2024.

== Career ==
=== Castleford Tigers ===
He joined the Castleford Tigers from Castleford Lock Lane ARLFC in 2014 and made his Super League début in 2015 against the Catalans Dragons. During three years with the Tigers he was loaned out to League 1 side Oxford RLFC and Championship side Batley.

=== Featherstone Rovers ===
On 9 September 2017 it was announced Holmes would leave Castleford for Featherstone Rovers at the end of the 2017 season.

=== Huddersfield Giants ===
On 17 December 2020, it was announced that Holmes had left the club to pursue options in the Championship.

=== Featherstone Rovers (rejoin) ===
On 22 December 2020, it was announced Holmes would return to Featherstone Rovers.

He played for Featherstone in their 2021 Million Pound Game defeat against Toulouse Olympique.

=== Sheffield Eagles (Loan) ===
In 2022 Holmes joined Championship side Sheffield Eagles on loan in the search of regular first-team minutes.

=== Bradford Bulls ===
On 11 September 2022, Holmes signed a two-year deal to join Bradford starting in the 2023 season.

On 20 October 2025 it was reported that he had left Bradford Bulls

=== Doncaster RLFC ===
On 4 November 2025, it was reported that Holmes had signed a two-year deal to join Doncaster RLFC in the 2026 season.
