= Keven Appo =

PNG international rugby league footballer (born 1999)

Personal information
- Born: 9 January 1999 (age 27) Goroka, Eastern Highlands Province, Papua New Guinea
- Height: 187 cm (6 ft 2 in)
- Weight: 101 kg (15 st 13 lb)

Playing information
- Position: Lock, Second-row
Club
Years	Team	Pld	T	G	FG	P
2020–22	PNG Hunters	41	11	0	0	44
2023–24	Bradford Bulls	46	13	0	0	52
	Total	87	24	0	0	96
Representative
Years	Team	Pld	T	G	FG	P
2022	PNG Prime Minister's XIII	1	0	0	0	0
2022	Papua New Guinea	3	0	0	0	0
- Source: As of 25 May 2026

Keven Appo (born 9 January 1999) is a Papua New Guinean professional rugby league footballer who last played as a second-row and lock for the Bradford Bulls in the RFL Championship and Papua New Guinea at international level.

== Career ==
Appo made his international debut for Papua New Guinea in their 24-18 loss to Tonga in the 2021 Rugby League World Cup.

== Sexual offence charges ==
On 3 January 2025 Bradford Bulls terminated Appo's contract with immediate effect after West Yorkshire Police announced that Appo had been charged with a number of sexual offences, including rape. A club statement said: “Following today’s West Yorkshire Police statement, the Bradford Bulls have cancelled Keven Appo’s playing contract. Given the circumstances, the club is duty bound to make no further comment at this stage. The search for a suitable, quality replacement is underway.”.

Appo was due to appear in court on 6 January 2025, but failed to do so. The court was told that Appo had been released on conditional bail on 26 November 2024 but within hours of his release he left the country and returned to Papua New Guinea via Dubai. The court issued a warrant for Appo's arrest. The Crown Prosecution Service and the police are seeking Appo's extradition from Papua New Guinea.

The following day Appo released a statement saying he denied all the allegations and that they "are false accusations/allegations based on personal gain/interest." The statement also said that he had not been sacked by Bradford, but had been released from his contract by mutual consent after he requested to leave.
