= 2026 Wigan Warriors season =

English rugby league season

Wigan Warriors 2026 season
- 2026 Challenge Cup champions
- 2026 Super League season Rank: 1st
- Play-off result: Semi-finals
- Challenge Cup: Champions
- 2026 record: Wins: 27; draws: 0; losses: 5
- Points scored: For: 851; against: 439

Team information
- CEO: Kris Radlinski
- Head Coach: Matt Peet
- Captain: Liam Farrell
- Stadium: Brick Community Stadium
- Avg. attendance: 15,937
- Agg. attendance: 207,183
- High attendance: 19,049
- Low attendance: 13,187

Top scorers
- Tries: Zach Eckersley (27)
- Goals: Adam Keighran (100)
- Points: Adam Keighran (260)
| Home colours | Away colours |
| ← 2025 | List of seasons | 2027 → |

The 2026 season is the Wigan Warriors's 46th consecutive season playing in England's top division of rugby league. They are competing in the 2026 Super League season and the 2026 Challenge Cup.

Following the end of the regular season, club captain Liam Farrell retired from professional rugby league.

== Preseason friendlies ==
Wigan's preseason game against Hull FC was Liam Marshall's testimonial match.

| Date and time | Versus | H/A | Venue | Result | Score | Tries | Goals | Attendance | TV | Report |
|---|---|---|---|---|---|---|---|---|---|---|
| 10 January; 13:00 | North Wales Crusaders | A | Eirias Stadium | L | 22–34 | Chan, Wadsworth, Sambou, Hodkinson | Lowe (2/3) | 1,509 | Not televised | |
| 1 February; 15:00 | Hull FC | H | Brick Community Stadium | W | 22–18 | Marshall, Nsemba, Field, Farrimond | Keighran (2/3), Farrimond (1/1) | 4,511 | Not televised | |

== Super League ==
=== Regular season ===
From 2026, the Super League expanded to 14 teams, with Toulouse Olympique and York Knights being promoted from the RFL Championship via the IMG Grading system. At a meeting of all twelve Super League teams at the Headingley Rugby Stadium on 28 July 2025 to vote on the expansion proposal, Wigan Warriors were the only club to abstain from voting.

Wigan's 2026 Super League fixtures were announced on 27 November 2025, with the opening round fixtures confirmed the day prior. After speculation regarding its inclusion in the 2026 calendar, Wigan's Magic Weekend fixture was confirmed on 25 November; with the event taking place at the Bramley-Moore Dock Stadium in Liverpool.

Wigan's away fixture against Catalans Dragons was moved to Paris by the hosts in 2025 to celebrate 20 years of the club competing in Super League, in addition to also marking 30 years of French clubs competing in the British rugby league system. The match will be played as a double-header with the Super XIII 2025–2026 Grand Final.

The club faced criticism for their round 12 squad section against Hull Kingston Rovers, naming 10 uncapped players in the match day squad a week ahead of the Challenge Cup final. The club quickly received backlash from its own fans and neutrals, with fans and journalists making similarities to Salford Red Devils's round 1 squad in 2025 which they received a two point deduction for. The matter was investigated by the Rugby Football League who determined there was no breach of operational rules.

==== Fixtures ====
| Date and time | Round | Versus | H/A | Venue | Result | Score | Tries | Goals | Attendance | TV (Note: Ahead of 2024, Sky Sports announced they would be broadcasting all Super League matches over the next three seasons. Exact TV channels can be sourced by using WayBack Machine on RugbyLeagueOnTV. NB Not all games were broadcast on Sky Sports TV (advertised as "Sky Sports Exclusives"), the remainder were broadcast using Sky Sports+, their on demand services accessible online or via red button. These games were also made available on Super League+, and a select few on the BBC. Further, games on Main Event or Sky One were also broadcast on Action.) | Pos. | Report |
|---|---|---|---|---|---|---|---|---|---|---|---|---|
| 15 February; 15:00 | Round 1 | Castleford Tigers | A | OneBore Stadium | W | 26–18 | Marshall; French; Eckersley (2); Wardle | Keighran (3/5) | 8,259 | Sky Sports+ / Super League+ / BBC iPlayer | 3rd | |
| 21 February; 20:00 | Round 2 | Hull FC | H | Brick Community Stadium | W | 34–6 | Walters; Eckersley; Eseh; Field (2); French | Keighran (5/6) | 16,620 | Sky Sports+ Red Button / Super League+ | 1st | |
| 26 February; 20:00 | Round 3 | Leigh Leopards | H | Brick Community Stadium | W | 54–0 | Keighran French; Field (2) Smith (2) Eckersley Nsemba Forber | Keighran (9/9) | 16,370 | Sky Sports Action | 1st | |
| 7 March; 17:00 (GMT) | Round 4 | Toulouse Olympique | A | Stade Ernest-Wallon | W | 36–16 | Eckersley (2); Keighran (2); French; O'Neill; Walters | Keighran (4/7) | 5,497 | Sky Sports+ | 1st | |
| 19 March; 20:00 | Round 5 | York Knights | H | Brick Community Stadium | W | 23–22 | Marshall (2); Hodkinson; Keighran | Keighran (3/4); Drop-goals: Smith | 13,187 | Sky Sports+ Red Button / Super League+ | 1st | |
| 28 March; 15:00 | Round 6 | Huddersfield Giants | H | Brick Community Stadium | L | 16–34 | Eckersley Farrimond Farrell | Smith (2/2) | 15,611 | Sky Sports+ Red Button / Super League+ | 1st | |
| 3 April; 15:00 | Round 7 (Good Friday) | St Helens | A | Brewdog Stadium | L | 24–34 | Smith Farrimond Field Eckersley | Keighran (4/4) | 17,918 | Sky Sports Main Event | 3rd | |
| 19 April; 15:00 | Round 8 | Castleford Tigers | H | Brick Community Stadium | L | 14–24 | Sambou Eckersley | Keighran (2/2 + 1 pen.) | 13,442 | Sky Sports+ Red Button / Super League+ | 5th | |
| 24 April; 20:00 | Round 9 | Warrington Wolves | A | Halliwell Jones Stadium | L | 6–23 | Eckersley | Keighran (1/1) | 13,218 | Sky Sports+ | 6th | |
| 2 May; 15:00 | Round 10 | Bradford Bulls | H | Brick Community Stadium | W | 38–14 | Eckersley Field (2) Hodkinson (3) O'Neill | Keighran (4/6); Hodkinson (1/1) | 13,362 | Sky Sports+ Red Button / Super League+ / BBC iPlayer | 5th | |
| 15 May; 20:00 | Round 11 | Leeds Rhinos | H | Brick Community Stadium | W | 24–4 | Farrimond Keighran Hodkinson Wardle | Keighran (4/4) | 14,627 | Sky One | 6th | |
| 21 May; 20:00 | Round 12 | Hull Kingston Rovers | A | Sewell Group Craven Park | L | 4–62 | Lowe | | 10,246 | Sky Sports+ | 6th | |
| 6 June; 18:30 (BST) | Round 13 | Catalans Dragons | N | Stade Jean-Bouin | W | 40–16 | Field Nsemba, Marsden Farrimond Wardle Eckersley Keighran | Keighran (5/7 + 1 pen.) | 12,525 | Sky Sports+ | 6th | |
| 12 June; 20:00 | Round 14 | Wakefield Trinity | A | DIY Kitchens Stadium | W | 48–10 | Farrell (2); Hodkinson (4) Partington Wardle Eckersley | Keighran (6/9) | 8,095 | Sky Sports+ | 4th | |
| 20 June; 15:00 | Round 15 | York Knights | A | York Community Stadium | W | 72–20 | Eseh; Wardle (2); Hodkinson (3); Keighran; Field (3) Nsemba French Farrimond | Keighran (10/13) | 7,258 | Sky Sports+ Red Button / Super League+ | 4th | |
| 27 June; 15:00 | Round 16 | Hull FC | A | MKM Stadium | W | 20–16 | Eckersley Hodkinson Keighran Smith | Keighran (1/4 + 1 pen.) | 12,272 | Sky Sports+ Red Button / Super League+ (Free Brordcast) | 3rd | |
| 5 July; 17:30 | Round 17 (Magic Weekend) | St Helens | N | Hill Dickinson Stadium | W | 16–14 | Keighran Field Eckersley | Keighran (2/3) | 42,903 | Sky Sports Action | 2nd | |
| 10 July; 20:00 | Round 18 | Warrington Wolves | H | Brick Community Stadium | W | 30–18 | Cartwright; Kerr; Eckersley; McDermott; Daniel | Keighran (5/5) | 16,621 | Sky Sports Action | 2nd | |
| 17 July; 20:00 | Round 19 | Huddersfield Giants | A | Accu Stadium | W | 24–10 | Partington Eckersley (3) | Keighran (4/4) | 3,391 | Sky Sports+ Red Button / Super League+ | 2nd | |
| 24 July; 20:00 | Round 20 | St Helens | H | Brick Community Stadium | W | 38–16 | French; Eckersley (2); Partington (2); Keighran | Keighran (6/6 + 1 pen.) | 18,906 | Sky Sports+ | 3rd | |
| 31 July; 20:00 | Round 21 | Leigh Leopards | A | Leigh Sports Village | W | 20–8 | Field; French Eckersley Hodkinson | Smith (2/4) | 10,265 | Sky Sports Action | 3rd | |
| 8 August; 17:30 | Round 22 | Toulouse Olympique | H | Brick Community Stadium | W | 48–18 | Eckersley (2) French Marshall (2) Hodkinson Eseh; Field | Smith (8/8) | 16,889 | Sky Sports+ Red Button / Super League+ | 2nd | |
| 15 August; 18:30 | Round 23 | Bradford Bulls | A | Odsal Stadium | W | 34–6 | Wardle (2) Keighran French McDermott Kerr | Smith (5/6) | 7,561 | Sky Sports+ Red Button / Super League+ | 2nd | |
| 21 August; 20:00 | Round 24 | Wakefield | H | Brick Community Stadium | W | 26–12 | French; Marshall (2) Field | Keighran (4/4 + 1 pen.) | 15,652 | Sky Sports Action | 2nd | |
| 27 August; 20:00 | Round 25 | Hull KR | H | Brick Community Stadium | W | 46–0 | Marshall (3) Field; Eckersley (2) Keighran Wardle | Keighran (7/8) | 16,847 | Sky Sports Action | 2nd | |
| 5 September; 20:00 | Round 26 | Leeds Rhinos | A | Headingley Rugby Stadium | W | 40–8 | Keighran (3) Daniel Marshall French; Field | Keighran (6/7) | 19,698 | Sky Sports Action | 1st | |
| 11 September; 20:00 | Round 27 | Catalans Dragons | H | Brick Community Stadium | W | 50–12 | Smith; Marshall (2) O'Neill; Farrell; Daniel; Field; Eckersley; Keighran | Keighran (7/8) | 19,049 | Sky Sports+ | 1st | |

==== Table ====
| Pos | Team | Pld | W | D | L | PF | PA | PD | Pts | Qualification |
|---|---|---|---|---|---|---|---|---|---|---|
| 1 | Wigan Warriors (L) | 27 | 22 | 0 | 5 | 851 | 439 | +412 | 44 | Advance to Semi-finals |
| 2 | Leeds Rhinos | 27 | 20 | 0 | 7 | 904 | 426 | +478 | 40 | Advance to Semi-finals |
| 3 | Warrington Wolves (Y) | 27 | 20 | 0 | 7 | 726 | 465 | +261 | 40 | Advance to Eliminators |
| 4 | Wakefield Trinity (C) | 27 | 19 | 0 | 8 | 709 | 486 | +223 | 38 | Advance to Eliminators |
| 5 | Leigh Leopards | 27 | 17 | 0 | 10 | 644 | 497 | +147 | 34 | Advance to Eliminators |
| 6 | Hull Kingston Rovers | 27 | 16 | 0 | 11 | 748 | 503 | +245 | 32 | Advance to Eliminators |
| 7 | St Helens | 27 | 15 | 0 | 12 | 636 | 614 | +22 | 30 | |
| 8 | Toulouse Olympique | 27 | 10 | 0 | 17 | 578 | 704 | −126 | 20 | |
| 9 | Catalans Dragons | 27 | 10 | 0 | 17 | 537 | 802 | −265 | 20 | |
| 10 | York Knights | 27 | 9 | 0 | 18 | 545 | 791 | −246 | 18 | |
| 11 | Hull FC | 27 | 8 | 0 | 19 | 488 | 597 | −109 | 16 | |
| 12 | Huddersfield Giants | 27 | 8 | 0 | 19 | 509 | 765 | −256 | 16 | |
| 13 | Castleford Tigers | 27 | 8 | 0 | 19 | 464 | 866 | −402 | 16 | |
| 14 | Bradford Bulls | 27 | 7 | 0 | 20 | 468 | 852 | −384 | 14 | |

Updated to match(es) played on 12 September 2026. Source:
(C) Champions; (L) League Leaders' Shield Winners; (Y) Runners up

=== Playoffs ===
| Date and time | Round | Versus | H/A | Venue | Result | Score | Tries | Goals | Attendance | TV | Report |
|---|---|---|---|---|---|---|---|---|---|---|---|
| 26 September; 17:30 | Semi-finals | Wakefield Trinity | H | Brick Community Stadium | L | 6–33 | O'Neill | Keighran (1/1) | 16,724 | Sky Sports Main Event / BBC Two | |

== Challenge Cup ==
| Date and time | Round | Versus | H/A | Venue | Result | Score | Tries | Goals | Attendance | TV | Report |
|---|---|---|---|---|---|---|---|---|---|---|---|
| 8 February; 15:00 | Round 3 | Rochdale Hornets | A | Spotland Stadium | W | 83–0 | Eckersley (4), French (2), Field (3), Farrimond, Partington, Wardle (3), Mago | Keighran (12/15); Drop-goals: French | 4,248 | Not televised | |
| 13 March; 20:00 | Round 4 | Bradford Bulls | H | Brick Community Stadium | W | 30–6 | Thompson, Eckersley, Marshall, Keighran, Sambou | Keighran (4/5), Smith (1/1) | 9,997 | Not televised | |
| 12 April; 13:00 | Quarter-final | Wakefield Trinity | A | Belle Vue | W | 26–22 | Mago, Marshall, Field, Eckersley (2) | Keighran (3/5) | 8,051 | BBC One | |
| 9 May; 14:30 | Semi-final | St Helens | N | Halliwell Jones Stadium | W | 32–0 | Farrimond (2), Eckersley (2), Wardle, Keighran | Keighran (1/2 + 1 pen.), Smith (2/4) (Note: Smith declined to take the final conversion with the final try being scored after the full-time hooter) | 13,421 | BBC One | |
| 30 May; 15:00 | Final | Hull Kingston Rovers | N | Wembley Stadium | W | 40–10 | Farrimond (2), Nsemba, Keighran (2), French, Thompson | Keighran (6/7) | 56,383 | BBC One | |

== Transfers ==
=== Gains ===
| Player | Club | Contract | Date |
|---|---|---|---|
| (England) Dayon Sambou | St Helens | 4 years | October 2025 |
| (England) Jonny Vaughan | St Helens | 4 years | October 2025 |
| (England) Oliver Wilson | Huddersfield Giants | 3 years | November 2025 |
| (England) Finn McMillan | Barrow Raiders | 2 years + 1 Year | December 2025 |
| (England) Oliver Partington | Catalans Dragons | 5 years | January 2025 |

=== Losses ===
| Player | Club | Contract | Date |
|---|---|---|---|
| (England) Christian Wade | Newcastle Red Bulls | | October 2025 |
| (Ireland) Liam Byrne | Warrington Wolves | 2 Years + 1 Year | October 2025 |
| (England) Trent Kelly-Duffy | Swinton Lions | | October 2025 |
| (England) Harvie Hill | Hull F.C. | 4 Years | October 2025 |
| (England) Tyler Dupree | Toulouse Olympique | 1 Year Loan (Note: Sold to Castleford Tigers in March) | November 2025 |
| (England) Jacob Douglas | St Helens | 3 Years | November 2025 |
| (England) Harvey Makin | Oldham Roughyeds | 1 Year Loan | November 2025 |
| (England) Kruise Leeming | Catalans Dragons | 1 Year Loan | January 2025 |
| (England) George Hirst | Castleford Tigers | 3 Years | March 2025 |

== Squad ==
2026 Wigan Warriors Squad
| First team squad | | | | Coaching staff |
|---|---|---|---|---|
| (Australia) 1 Jai Field – FB, SO; (England) 2 Zach Eckersley – CE, WG; (Australia) 3 Adam Keighran (gk) – CE, SO, HK; (England) 4 Jake Wardle – CE, WG; (England) 5 Liam Marshall – WG; (Australia) 6 Bevan French – SO, FB, WG; (England) 7 Harry Smith (gk) – SH, SO; (England) 8 Ethan Havard – PR; (England) 9 Brad O'Neill – HK, LF; (England) 10 Luke Thompson – PR, LF; (England) 11 Junior Nsemba – LF, SR; (England) 12 Liam Farrell (c) – SR, LF; (Australia) 13 Kaide Ellis – PR, LF | (England) 14 Sam Walters – SR; (New Zealand) 15 Patrick Mago – PR; (Lebanon) 16 Abbas Miski – WG; (England) 17 Oliver Partington – LF; (England) 19 Jack Farrimond – SH; (England) 20 Sam Eseh – PR; (England) 21 Oliver Wilson – PR; (England) 22 Tom Forber – HK; (England) 23 Kian McDermott – PR; (England) 24 Harvey Makin – PR; (England) 25 Taylor Kerr – LF; (England) 26 Nathan Lowe – CE | (England) 27 Lukas Mason – SR; (England) 28 Noah Hodkinson – FB, WG; (France) 29 Tiaki Chan – PR; (England) 31 Jonny Vaughan – CE; (England) 32 Dayon Sambou – CE; (England) 33 George O'Loughlin – WG; (England) 34 Finlay Yeomans – CE, SO; (England) 35 Fin McMillan – LF, SR; (England) 36 George Marsden; (England) 37 Josh Cartwright – FB; (England) 38 Austin Daniel – WG; (England) 39 Charlie Yeomans – SH | (England) 40 Lewis Daniels – SR; (England) 41 Shea O'Connor – SO; (England) 42 Kalum Rathbone – HK | Head coach: (England) Matt Peet; Assistant coaches: (New Zealand) Thomas Leuluai; (England) Sean O’Loughlin; Legend: (c) Captain(s); (vc) Vice-captain(s); (gk) = Goal kicker; Updated: 5 January 2026; Source(s): 2026 Squad Numbers |

== See also ==
- 2026 Wigan Warriors Women season
