= 2025 Wigan Warriors season =

English rugby league season

Wigan Warriors 2025 season
- 2025 Super League season Rank: 2nd
- Play-off result: Runners-up
- Challenge Cup: 4th Round
- 2025 record: Wins: 22; draws: 0; losses: 7
- Points scored: For: 794; against: 333

Team information
- CEO: Kris Radlinski
- Head Coach: Matt Peet
- Captain: Liam Farrell
- Stadium: Brick Community Stadium
- Avg. attendance: 17,145
- Agg. attendance: 223,995
- High attendance: 24,294
- Low attendance: 13,932

Top scorers
- Tries: Jai Field (24)
- Goals: Adam Keighran (67/80)
- Points: Adam Keighran (162)
Home colours	Away colours	Third colours
← 2024	List of seasons	2026 →

The 2025 season was the Wigan Warriors's 45th consecutive season playing in England's top division of rugby league. They competed in the 2025 Super League season, and the 2025 Challenge Cup. Under ordinary circumstances, they would also have contest the 2025 World Club Challenge.

== Preseason friendlies ==
Date and time	Versus	H/A	Venue	Result	Score	Tries	Goals	Attendance	Report
19 January; 15:00	Oldham Roughyeds	A	Boundary Park	W	28–16	Dupree, Douglas, Byrne, Forber, Cartwright, Yeomans	Eckersley (2/6)	3,028	
26 January; 15:00	Leeds Rhinos	A	Headingley	L	4–22	Eckersley	Keighran (0/1)	5,055	

== World Club Challenge ==
Ahead of the 2024 NRL Grand Final, reports began circulating that the 2025 World Club Challenge would be at risk of being cancelled as teams that could potentially qualify (Penrith Panthers, Warrington Wolves, and Wigan Warriors) would have difficulty arranging travel to either the UK or Australia, then to the United States, with the usual date of the tournament being close to that of the 2025 Rugby League Las Vegas event. Following Penrith's victory in the Grand Final, thus qualification for the tournament, it was revealed that 15 or 16 February would be the latest they would play the tournament, leaving time for travel back to Australia then out to the United States, while also maximising their pre-season, citing player welfare as in issue. However, with this weekend being the opening weekend of the 2025 Super League season, the date was unlikely.

On 9 October 2024, Penrith confirmed to the NRL that they would not play the match before the start of the domestic seasons citing player welfare as the issue stating that their players were delaying their mandated leave to play in the 2024 Rugby League Pacific Championships and 2024 Samoa rugby league tour of England thus not allowing players to have an adequate preseason before the World Club Challenge. The club stated that it was open to working with the NRL for a solution to play the match, but would not as things stand currently.

Following the conclusion of the 2024 Super League Grand Final, Wigan Warriors captain Liam Farrell confirmed the champions' commitment to the 2025 World Club Challenge and stated that the club would be working to ensure the game goes ahead. These words later confirmed by CEO Kris Radlinski.

On 16 October, Radlinski contacted the NRL and Penrith about playing the game during Magic Round (requiring the NRL to schedule one of Penrith's byes for this round), an idea proposed on social media by Penrith's Nathan Cleary two days prior. However this idea never came to fruition with Penrith facing Brisbane in Magic Round.

Date and time	Versus	H/A	Venue	Result	Score	Tries	Goals	Attendance	TV	Report
Not scheduled	Penrith Panthers	A (Note: The match was never officially scheduled however 2025 would have been the NRL Champion's turn to host.)	Western Sydney Stadium (Note: Penrith played the 2025 season at the Western Sydney Stadium with their home ground, Penrith Stadium, undergoing redevelopment.)	Cancelled	N/A					

Wigan remain world champions by virtue of their victory in the competition in 2024, however did not receive a separate title for 2025 in lieu of Penrith's withdrawal.

== Super League ==
=== Regular season ===
On 9 July 2024, the club announced they would be part of the 2025 Rugby League Las Vegas event, playing their home match against Warrington Wolves at the Allegiant Stadium in Paradise, Nevada. Wigan's matchweek 1, 2, and rival Round fixtures were confirmed on 20 November 2024, with the rest coming the following day. Wigan's opening round match set a record for the highest attendanced opening game of Super League, it also is the only game to have ended 0–0 after 80 minutes in the summer era.

==== Fixtures ====
Date and time	Round	Versus	H/A	Venue	Result	Score	Tries	Goals	Attendance	TV (Note: Ahead of 2024, Sky Sports announced they would be broadcasting all Super League matches over the next three seasons. Exact TV channels can be sourced by using WayBack Machine on RugbyLeagueOnTV. NB Not all games were broadcast on Sky Sports TV (advertised as "Sky Sports Exclusives"), the remainder were broadcast using Sky Sports+, their on demand services accessible online or via red button. These games were also made available on Super League+, and a select few on the BBC. Further, games on Main Event were also broadcast on Action or Arena.)	Pos.	Report
13 February; 20:00	Round 1	Leigh Leopards	H	Brick Community Stadium	L	0–1 (g.p.)			21,748	Sky Sports Action	8th	
21 February; 20:00	Round 2	Hull F.C.	A	MKM Stadium	W	46–4	Field (3), Miski, Mago, Forber, Wardle, French	Keighran (7/8)	14,751	Sky Sports+ Red Button / Super League+	5th	
1 March, 21:30 (GMT)	Round 3 (Rugby League Las Vegas)	Warrington Wolves	N	Allegiant Stadium	W	48–24	Dupree, Miski, French, Smith, Field, Wardle, Thompson, Marshall	Keighran (8/8)	45,209	Sky Sports Main Event	4th	
9 March; 13:00	Round 4	Huddersfield Giants	H	Brick Community Stadium	W	44–18	Farrell (2), Eckersley, Marshall, French, Wardle, Field, Leeming	Keighran (6/8)	17,625	Sky Sports+ Red Button / Super League+	4th	
22 March; 17:30	Round 5	Leeds Rhinos	A	Headingley	L	10–12	Marshall, French	Smith (1/2)	15,966	Sky Sports Main Event	5th	
30 March; 15:00	Round 6	Salford Red Devils	H	Brick Community Stadium	W	54–0	Wardle (3), Field (2), Nsemba, Marshall, French, Walters, Eckersley	Smith (7/10)	14,262	Sky Sports+ Red Button / Super League + / BBC Red Button (Delayed broadcast)	3rd	
11 April; 20:00	Round 7	Hull KR	A	Craven Park	W	28–12	Eckersley, Wardle, Smith, Field, Miski,	Smith (4/4)	~10,800	Sky Sports Action	3rd	
18 April; 15:00	Round 8 (Good Friday)	St Helens	H	Brick Community Stadium	W	24–14	Field (2), Miski (2)	Smith (3/4 + 1 pen.)	24,294	Sky Sports Main Event	2nd	
27 April; 15:00	Round 9	Hull F.C.	A	MKM Stadium	W	36–12	French (2), Field, Nsemba (2), Wardle, Miski	Keighran (4/6), Smith (0/1)	11,205	Sky Sports+ Red Button / Super League+	2nd	
4 May; 15:15	Round 10 (Magic Weekend)	Warrington Wolves	N	St James' Park	W	22–20	Field, French, Miski, Keighran	Keighran (3/4)	32,862	Sky Sports Action	2nd	
16 May; 20:00 (Note: Played as a double-header with the women's Round 1 Super League 40–6 victory over York Valkyrie.)	Round 11	Leigh Leopards	H	Brick Community Stadium	W	36–28	Marshall, Wardle, Keighran, Nsemba, Ellis, Eckersley, Leeming	Keighran (4/7)	17,449	Sky Sports Action	2nd	
24 May; 17:30 (BST)	Round 12	Catalans Dragons	A	Stade Gilbert Brutus	W	48–0	Field, Walters, Marshall (2), Leeming, Nsemba, French, Smith	Keighran (8/9)	10,103	Sky Sports Action	2nd	
30 May, 20:00	Round 13	Salford Red Devils	A	Salford Community Stadium	W	46–6	Field (2), Douglas (3), Eckersley, Keighran, Farrimond	Keighran (7/8)	Unknown	Sky Sports+ Red Button / Super League+	2nd	
14 June; 15:00	Round 14	Huddersfield Giants	N	Crown Flatt (Note: Huddersfield schedule home match against Wigan will be held at Crown Flatt due to Huddersfield's home ground, the Kirklees Stadium, being pre booked for a Stereophonics concert on the day of the match.)	W	22–18	Marshall, Field, Farrimond (2)	Keighran (2/3), Marshall (1/1)	4,982	Sky Sports+ Red Button / Super League+	2nd	
20 June; 20:00	Round 15	Wakefield Trinity	A	Belle Vue	L	10–16	Keighran, Field	Keighran (1/1)	7,753	Sky Sports+ / Super League+	2nd	
28 June; 20:00	Round 16	Castleford Tigers	A	Wheldon Road	W	26–20	Field, Keighran, Eckersley, Farrell	Keighran (4/4 + 1 pen.)	Unknown	Sky Sports+ Red Button / Super League + / BBC Red Button	2nd	
4 July; 20:00	Round 17	Leigh Leopards	A	Leigh Sports Village	L	8–18	Wardle	Keighran (1/1 + 1 pen.)	10,375	Sky Sports Action	2nd	
11 July; 20:00	Round 18	Huddersfield Giants	H	Brick Community Stadium	W	30–10	Wade, Wardle (2), Dupree, Nsemba	Keighran (5/5)	15,175	Sky Sports+ Red Button / Super League+	2nd	
19 July; 15:00	Round 19	Hull F.C.	H	Brick Community Stadium	L	12–32	Wade, Havard	Smith (2/2)	14,427	Sky Sports+ Red Button / Super League + / BBC Two	2nd	
25 July, 20:00	Round 20	Catalans Dragons	H	Brick Community Stadium	W	28–18	Wardle, Farrimond, Leeming, Eckersley, O’Neill	Smith (4/5)	14,760	Sky Sports Mix	2nd	
8 August; 20:00	Round 21	Warrington Wolves	A	Halliwell Jones Stadium	W	24–18	O’Neill, Farrimond (2), Farrell, Eckersley	Smith (2/5)	12,503	Sky Sports Action	2nd	
15 August; 20:00	Round 22	Hull KR	H	Brick Community Stadium	L	6–10	Keighran	Keighran (1/1)	20,218	Sky Sports Action	2nd	
24 August, 15:00	Round 23	Wakefield Trinity	H	Brick Community Stadium	W	44–2	Keighran, French, Eckersley (2), Nsemba, Field, Marshall, Walters	Keighran (1/1), Smith (5/7)	13,932	Sky Sports+ Red Button / Super League+	2nd	
30 August; 20:00 (BST)	Round 24	Catalans Dragons	A	Stade Gilbert Brutus	W	40–4	Marshall (3), Field (2), Eckersley (2)	Smith (6/7)	Unknown	Sky Sports Action	2nd	
5 September; 20:00 (Note: Played as a double-header with the women's Round 11 Super League 24–20 victory over St Helens. This was Wigan final fixture of regular season (following Warrington's withdrawal and subsequent cancellation of the following week's final game), and saw Wigan win their first League Leaders' Shield.)	Round 25	St Helens	A	Totally Wicked Stadium	W	18–4	Wardle, Marshall, Field	Smith (2/3)	Unknown	Sky Sports+	2nd	
12 September; 20:00	Round 26	Castleford Tigers	H	Brick Community Stadium	W	62–6	Miski (2), Field (2), Marshall (2), Farrimond (2), Hill, Eckersley, Havard	Farrimond (9/11)	15,224	Sky Sports+ Red Button / Super League+	2nd	
19 September; 20:00	Round 27	Leeds Rhinos	H	Brick Community Stadium	W	22–6	Miski, French (2), Wardle	Keighran (3/4)	16,268	Sky Sports+ Red Button / Super League+	2nd	

==== Table ====
Pos	Team	Pld	W	D	L	PF	PA	PD	Pts	Qualification
1	Hull Kingston Rovers (L, C)	27	22	0	5	786	292	+494	44	Advance to Semi-finals
2	Wigan Warriors	27	21	0	6	794	333	+461	42	Advance to Semi-finals
3	Leigh Leopards	27	19	1	7	619	452	+167	39	Advance to Eliminators
4	Leeds Rhinos	27	18	0	9	610	310	+300	36	Advance to Eliminators
5	St Helens	27	17	0	10	677	314	+363	34	Advance to Eliminators
6	Wakefield Trinity (Note: Salford forfeited their game against Wakefield. Under RFL operational rules, the game is recorded as a 48–0 victory for Wakefield, and converse loss for Salford, with the points scored and conceded applying to both teams.)	27	15	0	12	688	458	+230	30	Advance to Eliminators
7	Hull FC	27	13	1	13	539	461	+78	27	
8	Warrington Wolves	27	10	0	17	480	641	−161	20	
9	Catalans Dragons	27	10	0	17	425	652	−227	20	
10	Huddersfield Giants	27	7	0	20	347	738	−391	14	
11	Castleford Tigers	27	6	0	21	396	815	−419	12	
12	Salford Red Devils (R)	27	3	0	24	234	1129	−895	4 (Note: On 22 September 2025, Salford Red Devils were deducted two points breaching "a number of RFL operational rules" surrounding their team selection for their Round 1 fixture against St Helens on 15 February 2025.)	Relegated to Championship

(C) Champions; (L) League Leaders' Shield Winners; (R) Relegated

=== Play-offs ===
Ahead of Wigan's semi-final, a controversy occurred after Leigh Leopards owner Derek Beaumont informed Wigan Warriors of his intent to boycott the fixture following "unacceptable" ticket allocation for his team's travelling support. This was in spite of Wigan's ticket allocation to Leigh being over double the minimum 10% of ground capacity required by the RFL at 5,400 in a 25,000 capacity stadium. Wigan stated that their allocation was the maximum they could give under the rules of the independent Safety Advisory Group and the club's Ground Safety Officer in addition to a police consultation.

Beaumont alleged that Wigan's statement on the issue was factually incorrect and an intentional attack on character, in addition to accusing Wigan of sharing private WhatsApp messages between the two clubs' CEOs and passing them off as formal correspondence. He further stated that threats to boycott the game came after Wigan cancelled a number of Leigh fans' tickets that were bought in the home stands and that the further ticket allocation was for these fans' safety to ensure these fans were segregated. This was in spite of him downplaying Wigan's safety concerns by citing the absence of safety issues between the two sides in previous games of the season. Beaumont claimed there was an agreement in place for Leigh to have a block in the East and West stands allocated to them if Leigh sold out the North Stand, and claimed he received no reasonable explanation as to why this was no longer the case. He further cited his side's deservace of extra allocation due to Wigan's allocation still being on sale and their previous season's semi-finals not selling out. He also stated his club was preparing for the semi-final as normal.

On the Monday following the tie, Leigh Leopards made an official complaint to the RFL over the aforementioned build up and Wigan's stewarding before and during the game.

Date and time	Round	Versus	H/A	Venue	Result	Score	Tries	Goals	Attendance	TV	Report
3 October; 20:00	Semi-finals	Leigh Leopards	H	Brick Community Stadium	W	18–6	French (2), Walters	Keighran (2/3 + 1 pen.)	18,523	Sky Sports+	
11 October; 18:00	Grand Final	Hull KR	N	Old Trafford	L	6–24	Smith	Keighran (0/1 + 1 pen.)	68,853	Sky Sports Main Event	

== Challenge Cup ==
On 25 June 2024, the RFL announced a change to the Challenge Cup format totalling 7 rounds compared to the previous 9, and Super League teams entering at round 3. Wigan were drawn away to Sheffield Eagles on 14 January 2025.

Date and time	Round	Versus	H/A	Venue	Result	Score	Tries	Goals	Attendance	TV	Report
7 February; 19:30	Round 3	Sheffield Eagles	A	Olympic Legacy Park	W	48–12	Field, French, Byrne, Eckersley, Walters, Keighran, Nsemba, Ellis	Keighran (8/8)	1,244	Not Televised	
15 March: 17:45	Round 4	Hull F.C.	H	Brick Community Stadium	L	22–26	Eckersley, Field, Nsemba, Farrell	Smith (3/4 + 1 pen.)	9,287	BBC Red Button	

== Transfers ==
=== Gains ===
Player	Club	Contract	Date
(England) George Hirst	Oldham Roughyeds	2 years + 1 year	October 2024
(England) Christian Wade	Gloucester Rugby	Until end of season	April 2025

=== Losses ===
Player	Club	Contract	Date
(England) Mike Cooper	Retired on medical advice		September 2024
(England) Ryan Hampshire	Free Agent (Note: Later joined Featherstone Rovers)		October 2024
(England) George Hirst	Oldham Roughyeds	1 Year Loan	October 2024
(England) Ryan Brown	Leigh Leopards	2 Years	October 2024
(England) Reagan Sumner	Widnes Vikings	1 Year	November 2024
(Samoa) Willie Isa	Retired		January 2025
(France) Tiaki Chan	Salford Red Devils	1 Year Loan	January 2025

== Squad ==
2025 Wigan Warriors Squad
First team squad			Coaching staff
(Australia) 1 Jai Field – FB, SO; (Lebanon) 2 Abbas Miski – WG; (Australia) 3 Adam Keighran (gk) – CE, SO, HK; (England) 4 Jake Wardle – CE, WG; (England) 5 Liam Marshall – WG; (Australia) 6 Bevan French – SO, FB, WG; (England) 7 Harry Smith (gk) – SH, SO; (England) 8 Ethan Havard – PR; (England) 9 Brad O'Neill – HK, LF; (England) 10 Luke Thompson – PR, LF; (England) 11 Junior Nsemba – LF, SR; (England) 12 Liam Farrell (c) – SR, LF; (Australia) 13 Kaide Ellis – PR, LF	(New Zealand) 15 Patrick Mago – PR; (Ireland) 16 Liam Byrne – PR; (England) 17 Kruise Leeming – HK; (England) 19 Tyler Dupree – PR; (England) 20 Harvie Hill – PR; (England) 21 Sam Walters – SR; (England) 22 Zach Eckersley – CE; (England) 23 Tom Forber – HK; (England) 24 Jack Farrimond – SH; (England) 25 Sam Eseh – PR; (England) 26 Jacob Douglas – WG	(England) 27 Harvey Makin – PR; (France) 28 Tiaki Chan – PR; (England) 29 Taylor Kerr – LF; (England) 30 Nathan Lowe; (England) 31 Lukas Mason – SR; (England) 32 Noah Hodkinson – FB; (England) 33 Kian McDermott – PR; (England) 34 George Hirst; (England) 38 Christian Wade – WG	Head coach: (England) Matt Peet; Assistant coaches: (New Zealand) Thomas Leuluai; (England) Sean O’Loughlin; Legend: (c) Captain(s); (vc) Vice-captain(s); (gk) = Goal kicker; Updated: 27 November 2024; Source(s): 2025 Squad Numbers

== See also ==
- 2025 Wigan Warriors Women season
