= 2026 Challenge Cup final =

Rugby league match in the United Kingdom

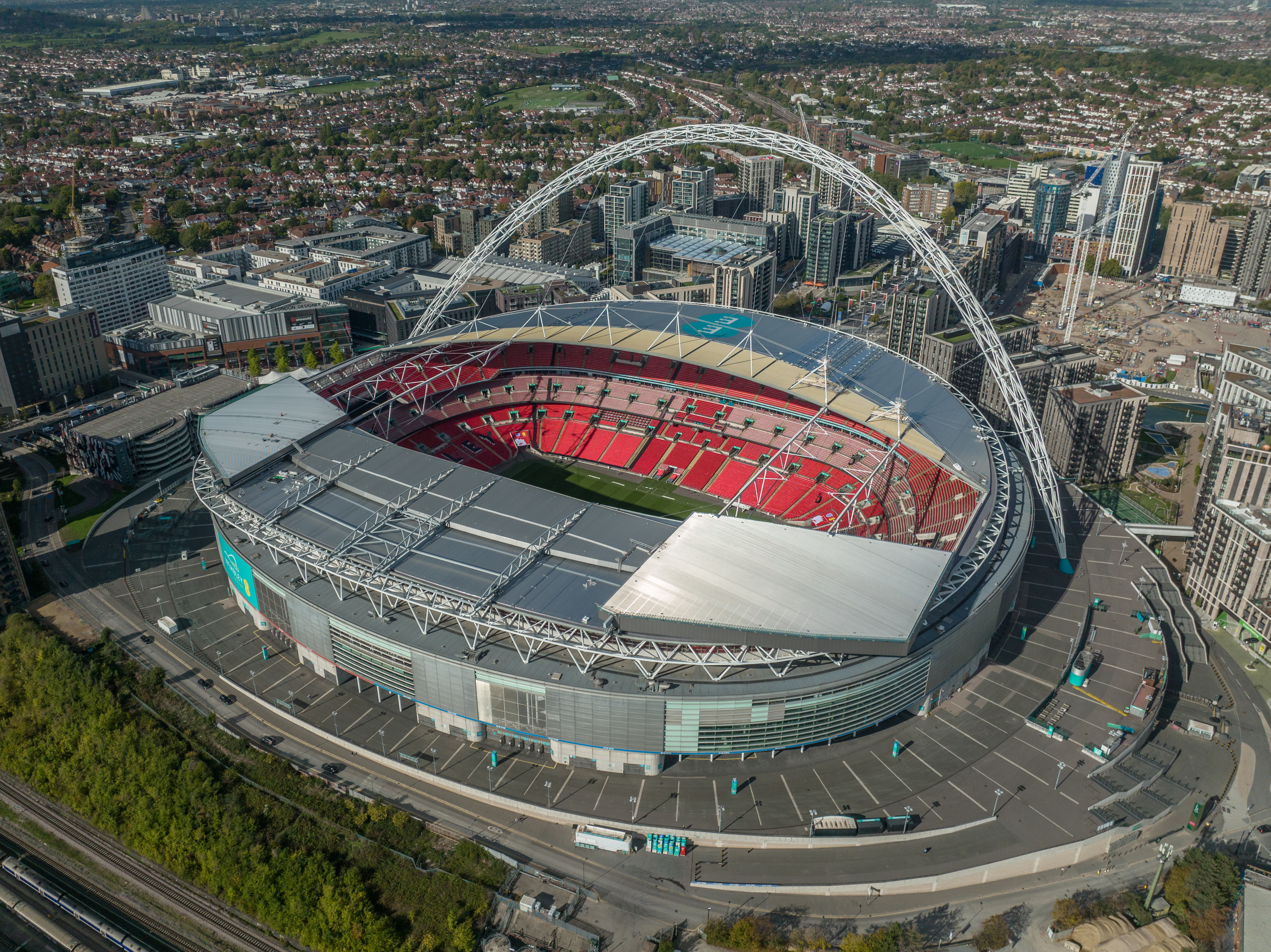
Wigan Warriors	Hull KR
40	10
	1	2	Total
WIG	10	30	40
HKR	4	6	10
- Date: 30 May 2026, 15:00
- Stadium: Wembley Stadium
- Location: London, United Kingdom
- Lance Todd Trophy: Jack Farrimond
- God Save The King and Abide with Me: Laura Wright
- Referee: Liam Moore
- Attendance: 56,383

Broadcast partners
- Broadcasters: (United Kingdom) BBC One (Australia) Fox Sports (Canada) Rogers (United States) Fox Sports

The 2026 Challenge Cup final was the 125th final of the Rugby Football League's Challenge Cup knock-out competition. The final was contested by the Wigan Warriors and Hull Kingston Rovers.

== Background ==
Defending champions Hull Kingston Rovers defeated the Warrington Wolves in the 2025 Challenge Cup final to claim the title for the second time in their history with the previous win coming in 1980.

Their opponents Wigan last won the competition in 2024, when they also defeated Warrington in the final, but were unable to defend the title in 2025 after losing to Hull F.C. in the fourth round.

Wigan's prop Sam Walters became the first person to be sent off in a challenge cup final since 1993.

== Route to the final ==
Both finalists entered the 2026 Challenge Cup in the third round of the competition.

=== Wigan Warriors ===
Round	Opposition	Venue	Score
Round 3	Rochdale Hornets	Spotland Stadium	83–0
Round 4	Bradford Bulls	Brick Community Stadium	30–6
Quarter-final	Wakefield Trinity	Belle Vue	26–22
Semi-final	St Helens	Halliwell Jones Stadium	32–0

=== Hull Kingston Rovers ===
Round	Opposition	Venue	Score
Round 3	Lock Lane	Craven Park	104–0
Round 4	Huddersfield Giants	Kirklees Stadium	52–12
Quarter-final	York Knights	Craven Park	48–10
Semi-final	Warrington Wolves	Eco-Power Stadium	32–12

== Pre-match ==
The women's final between Wigan Warriors and St Helens took place before the match, which saw a Wigan victory with a score of 54–6.

On 30 April, the Rugby Football League announced that mezzo-soprano Laura Wright would sing the national anthem and Abide with Me ahead of the match.

== Match details ==
Saturday, 30 May 2026
15:00 BST (UTC+01:00)

Wigan Warriors	40–10	Hull KR
Tries: Farrimond 6', 35'; Nsemba 43'; Keighran 52', 56'; French 64'; Thompson 73'; Walters (red card) 78'; Goals: Keighran (6/7)		Tries: Hiku 40', 71'; Goals: Martin (1/2)

Wembley Stadium, London
Attendance: 56,383
Referee: Liam Moore
Video referee: Chris Kendall
Touch judges:
- Marcus Griffiths
- Mark Craven
Lance Todd Trophy: Jack Farrimond

=== Teams ===
Team details
Wigan Warriors		Position	Hull KR
Name	Number	Position	Number	Name
Jai Field	1	FB	14	Jack Broadbent
Zach Eckersley	2	WG	2	Tom Davies
Adam Keighran 36', 43', 52', 53' 56' 57', 65', 73'	3	CE	3	Peta Hiku 40', 71'
Jake Wardle	4	CE	4	Oliver Gildart
Noah Hodkinson	28	WG	5	Joe Burgess
Farrimond 6', 35', (substituted off) 60'	19	SO	6	Mikey Lewis
Harry Smith	7	SH	7	Tyrone May
Sam Walters (substituted off) 27', (substituted on) 60', (red card) 78'	14	PR	8	Sauaso Sue (substituted off) 16', (substituted on) 49'
Brad O'Neill	9	HK	9	Jez Litten
Luke Thompson (substituted off) 25', (substituted on) 67', 73'	10	PF	10	Tom Amone (substituted off) 49'
Junior Nsemba 43'	11	SR	11	Dean Hadley (substituted off) 4'
Liam Farrell	12	SR	12	James Batchelor
Oliver Partington (substituted off) 48'	17	LF	13	Elliot Minchella (substituted off) 51'
Bevan French (substituted on) 60', 64'	6	IN	15	Sam Luckley (substituted on) 16', (substituted off) 37'
Ethan Havard (substituted on) 25', (substituted off) 67'	8	IN	17	Rhyse Martin (substituted on) 4', (goal) 71'
Kaide Ellis (substituted on) 27'	13	IN	18	Jack Brown (substituted on) 37'
Patrick Mago (substituted on) 48' (substituted off) 60'	15	IN	22	Bill Leyland (substituted on) 51'
(England) Matt Peet		Coach		(Australia) Willie Peters

== Post match ==
Jack Farrimond won the Lance Todd Trophy, while Adam Keighran equalled the record for the most points scored in a single challenge cup final with 20.

Sam Walters received a seven match ban for a Grade F tackle on Bill Leyland becoming the first player to revive a red card in the Challenge Cup final since 1993. Junior Nsemba, who was also involved in the tackle, received no disciplinary action.

The 2026 final was attended by 56,383 people, the lowest attendance since 1946. With attendances on a downward trend since the first final at the new Wembley Stadium, a record low figure brought a recent annual debate about the venue into more mainstream media attention. The Guardian noted that Wembley still had an appeal to fans; however, with the Super League Grand Final and Magic Weekend, the Challenge Cup final is no longer the sports "big day out" that it once was in previous decades. Further, more recent events like Rugby League Las Vegas and Catalans Dragons 20th birthday match against Wigan in Paris (played one week after the final) had accelerated the downward trend. The Guardian also criticised the Rugby Football League for having amateur divisions play on Cup final weekend, claiming it limited the number of neutral fans that could attend the final.

The final was watched by 933,000 on TV, accounting for 14.4% of the audience share.
