= 2024 Challenge Cup final =

English rugby league cup final

2024 Challenge Cup Final
Warrington Wolves	Wigan Warriors
8	18
	1	2	Total
WAR	2	6	8
WIG	12	6	18
- Date: 8 June 2024, 15:07
- Stadium: Wembley Stadium
- Location: London, United Kingdom
- Lance Todd Trophy: Bevan French
- God Save The King and Abide with Me: Katherine Jenkins
- Referee: Chris Kendall
- Attendance: 64,845

Broadcast partners

The 2024 Challenge Cup Final was the 123rd final of the Rugby Football League's Challenge Cup knock-out competition. The final was contested by Wigan Warriors and Warrington Wolves. This was the first time since 1990 that the teams had met in the final.

== Background ==
The 2024 Challenge Cup final was only the second time Wigan Warriors and Warrington Wolves have played each other in the cup final – the first in 1990. Outside of the final, there have been 23 previous meetings in the cup.

Wigan have won the competition a record 20 times, and entered the 2024 final as world champions. Their most recent final was in 2022, their first since 2013, beating Huddersfield Giants.

Warrington's most recent final was in 2019 beating St Helens to win their ninth title, one year after their Wembley defeat to Catalans Dragons.

Upon qualification for the final, Wigan were first in Super League with Warrington in third.

== Route to the final ==
=== Wigan Warriors ===
Round	Opposition	Venue	Score
Sixth round	Sheffield Eagles	DW Stadium	44–18
Quarter-final	Castleford Tigers	Wheldon Road	60–6
Semi-final	Hull KR	Eco-Power Stadium	38–6

=== Warrington Wolves ===
Round	Opposition	Venue	Score
Sixth round	London Broncos	Halliwell Jones Stadium	42–0
Quarter-final	St Helens	Totally Wicked Stadium	31–8
Semi-final	Huddersfield Giants	Totally Wicked Stadium	46–10

== Pre-match ==
British mezzo-soprano Katherine Jenkins sang the national anthem and Abide with Me ahead of the match. Jenkins was supported by British DJ Alex Simmons in providing the pre match entertainment.

Prior to the game, the women's final was played and was won 22–0 by St Helens against Leeds. Wigan's St Peter's Catholic High School won the Year 7 School's Final against Cardiff's Ysgol Gyfun Gymraeg Glantaf.

Wigan's Adam Keighran and Tyler Dupree missed the final after both picking up a Grade D charge, three-match domestic ban following their Super League game against Warrington a week before the final. Keighran received a red card for a reckless tackle, and Dupree was charged with a headbutt, which was missed by the match official.

Following the death of Rob Burrow on 2 June, the RFL announced that kick-off for the final would be put back from 3pm to 3:07pm to honour Rob and the number seven shirt he wore. Rob's death was commemorated with a minute's silence before kick-off and with a minute's applause during the seventh minute of the game.

== Match details ==
Saturday, 8 June 2024
3:07pm (BST)

Warrington Wolves	8–18	Wigan Warriors
Tries: Dufty 63'; Goals: Thewlis (2/2) 10' (pen), 64	report	Tries: Eckersley 17', French 23', Farrell 57'; Goals: Smith (3/3) 18', 24' 58'

Wembley Stadium, London
Attendance: 64,685
Referee: Chris Kendall
Touch judges: Johnny Roberts, Richard Thompson
Lance Todd Trophy: Bevan French

=== Teams ===
Team details
Warrington Wolves		Position	Wigan Warriors
Name	Number	Position	Number	Name
Matt Dufty (yellow card) 4' to 14'	1	FB	1	Jai Field
Josh Thewlis	2	WG	2	Abbas Miski
Toby King	3	CE	26	Zach Eckersley
Rodrick Tai	14	CE	4	Jake Wardle
Matty Ashton	5	WG	5	Liam Marshall
George Williams	6	SO	6	Bevan French
Josh Drinkwater	7	SH	7	Harry Smith
James Harrison (substituted off) 25' (substituted in) 54'	8	PR	14	Mike Cooper (yellow card) 3' to 13' (substituted off) 26' (substituted in) 65'
Danny Walker (substituted off) 47' (substituted in) 61'	9	HK	9	Brad O'Neill (substituted off) 29' (substituted in) 55'
Paul Vaughan (substituted off) 29' (substituted in) 42'	10	PF	16	Luke Thompson (substituted off) 33' (substituted in) 55'
Matty Nicholson	13	SR	21	Junior Nsemba (substituted off) 75'
Lachlan Fitzgibbon (substituted off) 42'	12	SR	12	Liam Farrell
Ben Currie	11	LF	13	Kaide Ellis
Zane Musgrove (substituted in) 50'	16	IN	8	Ethan Havard (substituted in) 26' (substituted off) 65'
Joe Bullock (substituted in) 29'	19	IN	10	Liam Byrne (substituted in) 41' (substituted off) 55'
Jordan Crowther (substituted in) 25'	17	IN	15	Patrick Mago (substituted in) 33' (substituted off) 41'
Sam Powell (substituted in) 47'	32	IN	17	Kruise Leeming (substituted in) 29' (substituted off) 55'
Stefan Ratchford (not used)	4	CS	18	Sam Walters (not used)
Sam Burgess		Coach		Matt Peet

With less than 2 minutes played, Warrington were awarded a penalty, after former Warrington player Mike Cooper, was penalised for a head contact tackle, to which he was then shown a yellow card, and Wigan were down to 12 players for the next 10 minutes.

Two minutes later, Wigan were awarded a penalty, with Matt Dufty also being sent to the sin bin for a high tackle.

The first points of the game went to Warrington inside 10 minutes, after Wigan were penalised for offside, and Josh Thewlis opted to kick for goal, to which he was successful. Warrington 2–0 Wigan.

With 17 minutes of the game played, Wigan scored the first try of the game, after Bevan French kicked the ball through, for Zach Eckersley to touch down, but the referee wanted confirmation from the video referee, to see if he had grounded the ball. (On field decision: try). after reviewing the replay, the try was awarded. Harry Smith's conversion was successful, and Wigan lead 6–2.

Six minutes later, Wigan scored their 2nd try of the game, as Smith offloaded for French to touch down near the posts – Smith again successful with the conversion, and Wigan lead 12–2.

Wigan then thought they had scored their 3rd try just before half time, but after a lengthy review from the video referee, Bevan French was denied, as it was deemed a double movement/knock on.

Half time: Warrington 2–12 Wigan.

Two minutes into the second half, Matty Ashton almost found a break out wide, but Abbas Miski and Zach Eckersley managed to tackle him into touch.

Five minutes later, Liam Marshall almost scored in the corner, but he was tackled into touch, and Warrington got the ball back.

On 55 minutes, Wigan scored again, with Liam Farrell finding a gap through the middle of the pitch, and running 30 metres, to score Wigan's 3rd try of the game. Smith again successful with the conversion.

Warrington 2–18 Wigan.

With time running out, Warrington knew they had to score soon, and on 65 minutes, Matt Dufty touched down under the posts, with Thewlis converting. Warrington 8–18 Wigan.

Final Score: Warrington 8–18 Wigan.

== Post match ==
Following the game the 2024 1895 Cup final was played. Wakefield Trinity beat Sheffield Eagles 50–6.

== See also ==
- 2024 Women's Challenge Cup final
