= Jumah Sambou =

English rugby league footballer

Personal information
- Full name: Jumah Sambou
- Born: 21 November 2001 (age 24) Warrington, Cheshire, England

Playing information

Rugby league
- Position: Wing, Centre
Club
Years	Team	Pld	T	G	FG	P
2022–23	St Helens	1	1	0	0	4
2023(DR)	→ Swinton Lions	1	0	0	0	0
2024–25	Oldham	10	10	0	0	40
2026–	Hull Kingston Rovers	0	0	0	0	0
2026(loan)	Widnes Vikings	5	4	0	0	16
	Total	17	15	0	0	60

Rugby union
Club
Years	Team	Pld	T	G	FG	P
2024	West Park St Helens	15	25	0	0	125
- Source: As of 10 April 2026
- Relatives: Dayon Sambou (brother)

Jumah Sambou (born 21 November 2001) is a professional rugby league footballer who plays as a winger or centre for Widnes Vikings in the Championship, on a season-long loan from Super League side Hull KR.

== Background ==
Jumah's younger brother Dayon Sambou plays for Wigan.

== Playing career ==
=== St Helens ===
Sambou made his first team début for St Helens in April 2022 against the Castleford Tigers. On 21 September 2023, it was announced that Sambou would be departing St Helens at the end of the 2023 Super League season.

=== Oldham RLFC ===
On 24 October 2023 it was reported that he had joined Oldham RLFC for the 2024 season on a two-year deal.

=== Hull KR ===
On 1 May 2025 it was reported that he had signed a 3-year deal with Hull KR starting in 2026

=== Widnes Vikings (loan) ===
On 26 January 2026 it was reported that he had joined Widnes Vikings on a season-long loan for the 2026 season.
