= Dubbo College =

Coordinates: 32.251°S 148.583°E

Information
- Motto: Bright Futures
- Established: 8 July 1917 (as Dubbo High School)
- Educational authority: NSW Department of Education
- Years offered: 7–12 (11–19 yr old)
- Website: https://dubbocoll-m.schools.nsw.gov.au/

Dubbo College is a government-funded secondary school located in Dubbo, in the Orana region of New South Wales, Australia.

The college consists of three campuses; the Delroy and South campuses for years 7–10 and the Senior campus for years 11–12.

== History ==
Dubbo College was formed to bring together the three state schools in Dubbo. Dubbo High School officially opened on 8 July 1917 and the original building operated for 84 years before it was closed in June 2001. In 1962 the Minister for Education announced a second high school, Dubbo High South, to deal with increasing numbers of students.

Dubbo High School published a quarterly school magazine called "the bindyite" which began in June 1918.

The Astley Cup is an annual inter-school sports contest between Bathurst High Campus, Orange High School, and Dubbo College. The competition was founded in 1923 and continues to the present day.

== Notable alumni ==
- Rawden Middleton VC – RAAF pilot and Victoria Cross recipient
- Tim Armstrong – Cricketer
- Kaide Ellis – Australian rugby league footballer
