= Dayon Sambou =

English rugby league footballer

Personal information
- Full name: Dayon Sambou
- Born: 14 April 2005 (age 20) Warrington, Cheshire, England

Playing information
- Position: Centre
Club
Years	Team	Pld	T	G	FG	P
2024–25	St Helens	6	1	0	0	4
2024(loan)	→ North Wales Crusaders	2	0	0	0	0
2025(DR)	→ Halifax Panthers	5	0	0	0	0
2026–	Wigan Warriors	1	1	0	0	4
2026(loan)	→ Salford RLFC	1	0	0	0	0
2026–	→ Halifax Panthers (loan)	1	3	0	0	12
	Total	16	5	0	0	20
- Source: As of 23 March 2026
- Relatives: Jumah Sambou (brother)

Dayon Sambou is a professional rugby league footballer who plays as a centre for the Halifax Panthers in the RFL Championship, on a one-week loan from the Wigan Warriors in the Super League.

He previously played for St Helens.

== Background ==
Sambou played his junior rugby league for the Woolston Rovers and Rylands Sharks.

== Club career ==
=== St Helens ===
Sambou played for St Helens academy team before being sent out on loan to North Wales in League One. Sambou made his club debut for St Helens against Warrington in round 5 of the 2025 Super League season scoring a try as Saints lost 14-12. Sambou was also sent out on loan to RFL Championship side Halifax.

=== Wigan Warriors ===
On 21 September 2025, Sambou signed a contract to join arch-rivals Wigan ahead of the 2026 season.

He made his 1st team debut on 13 March 2026, scoring a try, in the 30-6 win over Bradford Bulls in the Challenge Cup.

=== Salford RLFC (loan) ===
On 5 March 2026 it was reported that he had signed for Salford RLFC in the RFL Championship on one-week loan

=== Halifax Panthers (loan) ===
On 20 March 2026 it was reported that he had signed for Halifax Panthers in the RFL Championship on one-week loan

He scored a hat-trick of tries in the 50-22 win over North Wales Crusaders on 22 March 2026.
