= Kaide Ellis =

Australian rugby league footballer

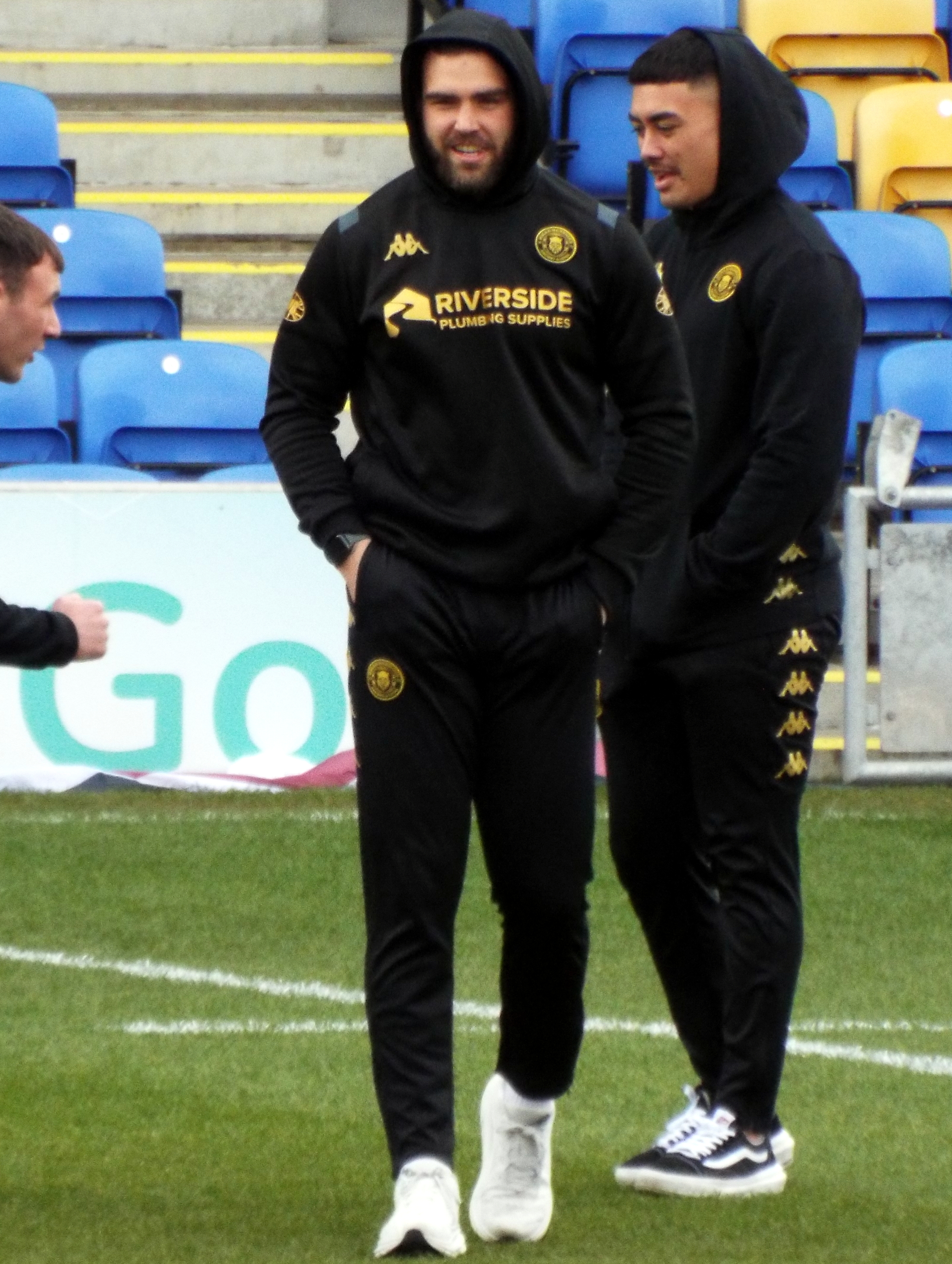

Personal information
- Born: 4 August 1996 (age 30) Dubbo, New South Wales, Australia
- Height: 6 ft 3 in (1.91 m)
- Weight: 17 st 7 lb (111 kg)

Playing information
- Position: Prop, Loose forward
Club
Years	Team	Pld	T	G	FG	P
2018–19	Penrith Panthers	8	0	0	0	0
2020–21	St. George Illawarra	18	0	0	0	0
2022–	Wigan Warriors	141	5	0	0	20
	Total	167	5	0	0	20
- Source: As of 30 December 2024

Kaide Ellis (born 4 August 1996) is an Australian professional rugby league footballer who plays as a prop and loose forward for the Wigan Warriors in the Super League.

He previously played for the Penrith Panthers in the National Rugby League.

== Club career ==
=== Youth career ===
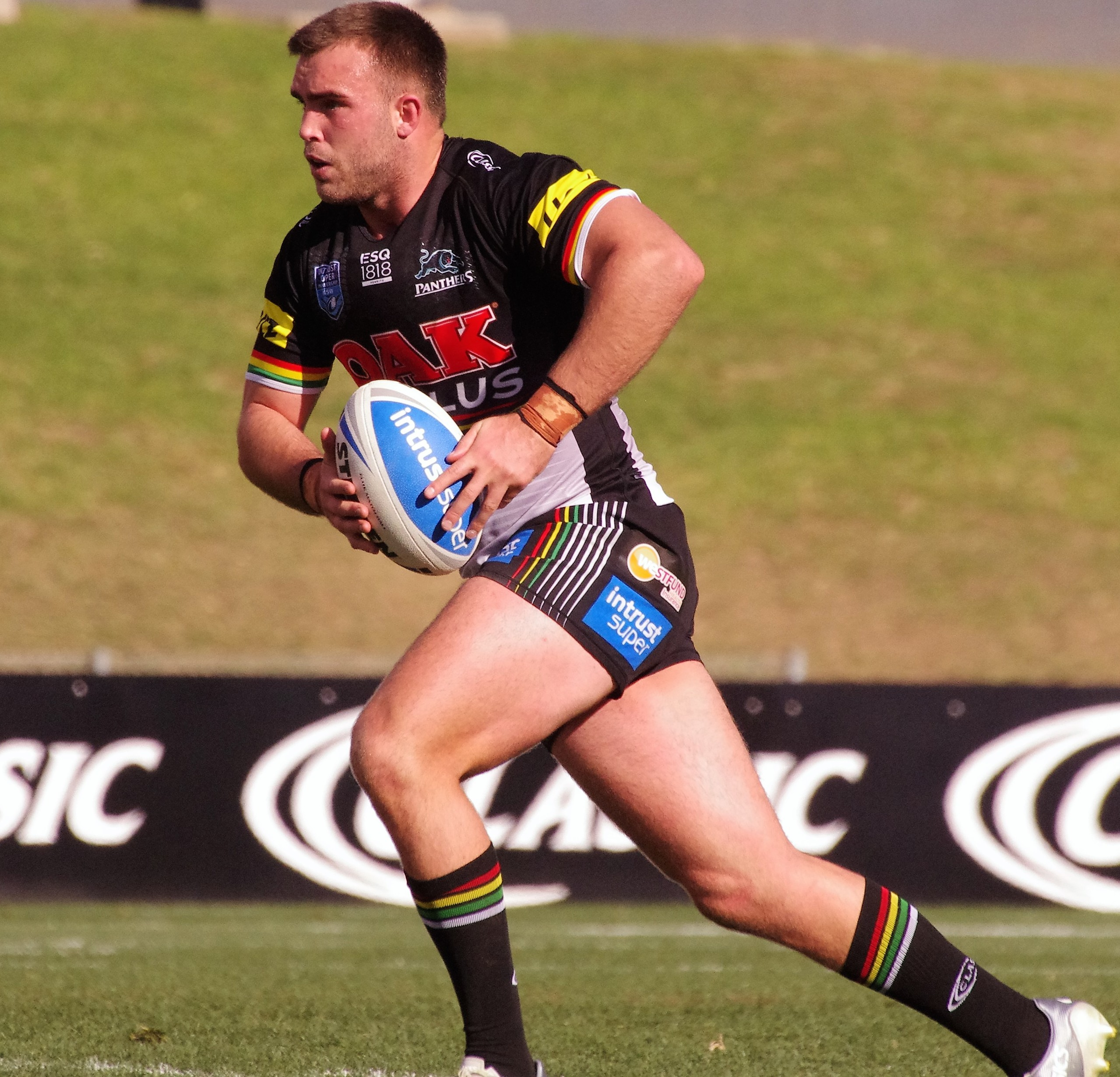
Ellis playing for the Penrith Panthers in 2018

Ellis was born in Dubbo, New South Wales, Australia, and was educated at Dubbo College Senior Campus where he represented 2013 NSW CHS team.

Kaide played his junior rugby league at St Johns Dubbo and South Dubbo Raiders.

He signed with the Penrith Panthers and won 2015 National Youth Competition Grand Final.

=== Penrith Panthers ===
Ellis made his first grade debut in Round 6 of the 2018 NRL season against the Gold Coast Titans at Penrith Park which ended in a 35–12 victory. Ellis was sin binned during the match for repeated infringements during the second half.

=== St George Illawarra Dragons ===
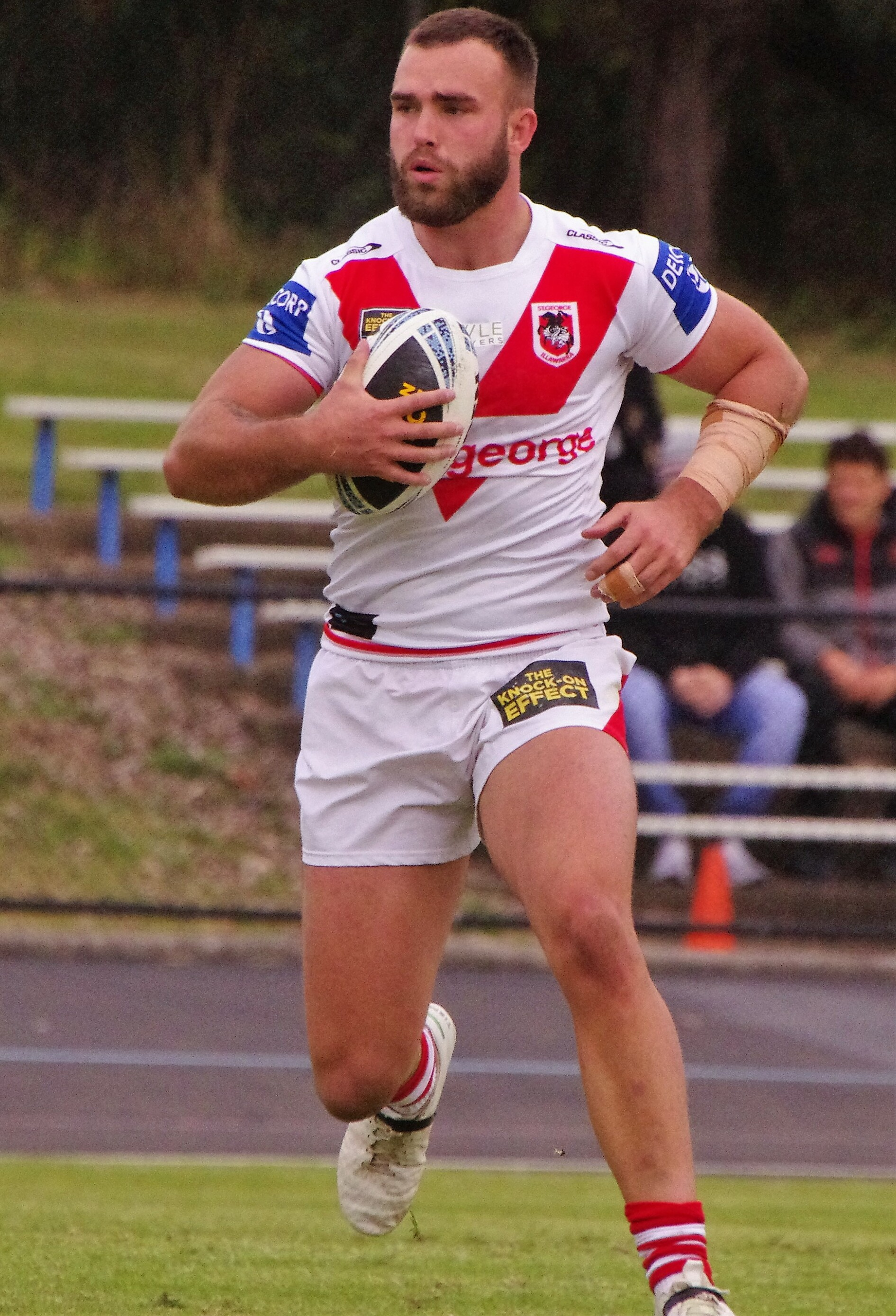
Ellis playing for the St. George Illawarra Dragons in 2021

On 12 July, Ellis was released by the Penrith club, signing for St. George Illawarra until the end of the 2020 season.

In November 2020, he signed a one-year contract extension to remain at the club in 2021.

=== Wigan Warriors ===
On 15 July 2021, Ellis signed for Wigan Warriors in the Super League on a three-year deal for the 2022 season.

In round 5 of the 2022 Super League season, Ellis was placed on report for fighting during the Wigan's 28–0 loss to Catalans Dragons. Ellis was subsequently banned for five matches over the incident. On 28 May 2022, he played for Wigan in their 2022 Challenge Cup Final victory over Huddersfield.

In the 2023 Challenge Cup quarter-final, Ellis was sent off during Wigan's 14–12 victory over Warrington. On 20 June, Ellis was given a three-game ban and a £250 fine over the incident. On 14 October, Ellis played in Wigan's 2023 Super League Grand Final victory over the Catalans Dragons.

On 24 February, Ellis played in Wigan's 2024 World Club Challenge final victory over Penrith. On 8 June, Ellis played in Wigan's 2024 Challenge Cup final victory over Warrington. On 12 October, Ellis played in Wigan's 9–2 2024 Super League grand final victory over Hull Kingston Rovers.

At the beginning of 2025, Ellis was praised for his strong start to the campaign, becoming a key member of Matt Peet's squad. In April, he signed a new four-year deal. Ellis again received public praise from Peet at the end of the season, praising his maturity and game development, with Peet considering him the club vice-captain. On 9 October 2025, Ellis played in Wigan's 24-6 2025 Super League Grand Final loss against Hull Kingston Rovers. On 30 May 2026, Ellis played in Wigan's 2026 Challenge Cup final victory against Hull Kingston Rovers.

== Controversy ==
On 5 July 2021, Ellis was fined $5000 by the NRL and suspended for one game after breaching the game's COVID-19 biosecurity protocols when he attended a party along with 12 other St. George Illawarra players at Paul Vaughan's property.

== Honours ==
=== Penrith Panthers (Reserves) ===
- NSW Cup
  - Winner: 2017

=== Wigan Warriors ===
- Super League
  - Winner: 2023, 2024
- League Leaders' Shield
  - Winner: 2023, 2024, 2026
- Challenge Cup
  - Winner: 2022, 2024, 2026
- World Club Challenge
  - Winner: 2024

== Statistics ==
Year	Team	Games	Tries	Pts
2018	Penrith Panthers	6		
2019	Penrith Panthers	2		
2020	St. George Illawarra Dragons	8		
2021	St. George Illawarra Dragons	10		
2022	Wigan Warriors	23	2	8
2023	Wigan Warriors	25		
2024	Wigan Warriors	31	1	4
2025	Wigan Warriors	31	2	8
2026	Wigan Warriors	10		
	Totals	141	5	20
