= Oliver Partington =

English professional rugby league footballer

Ollie Partington
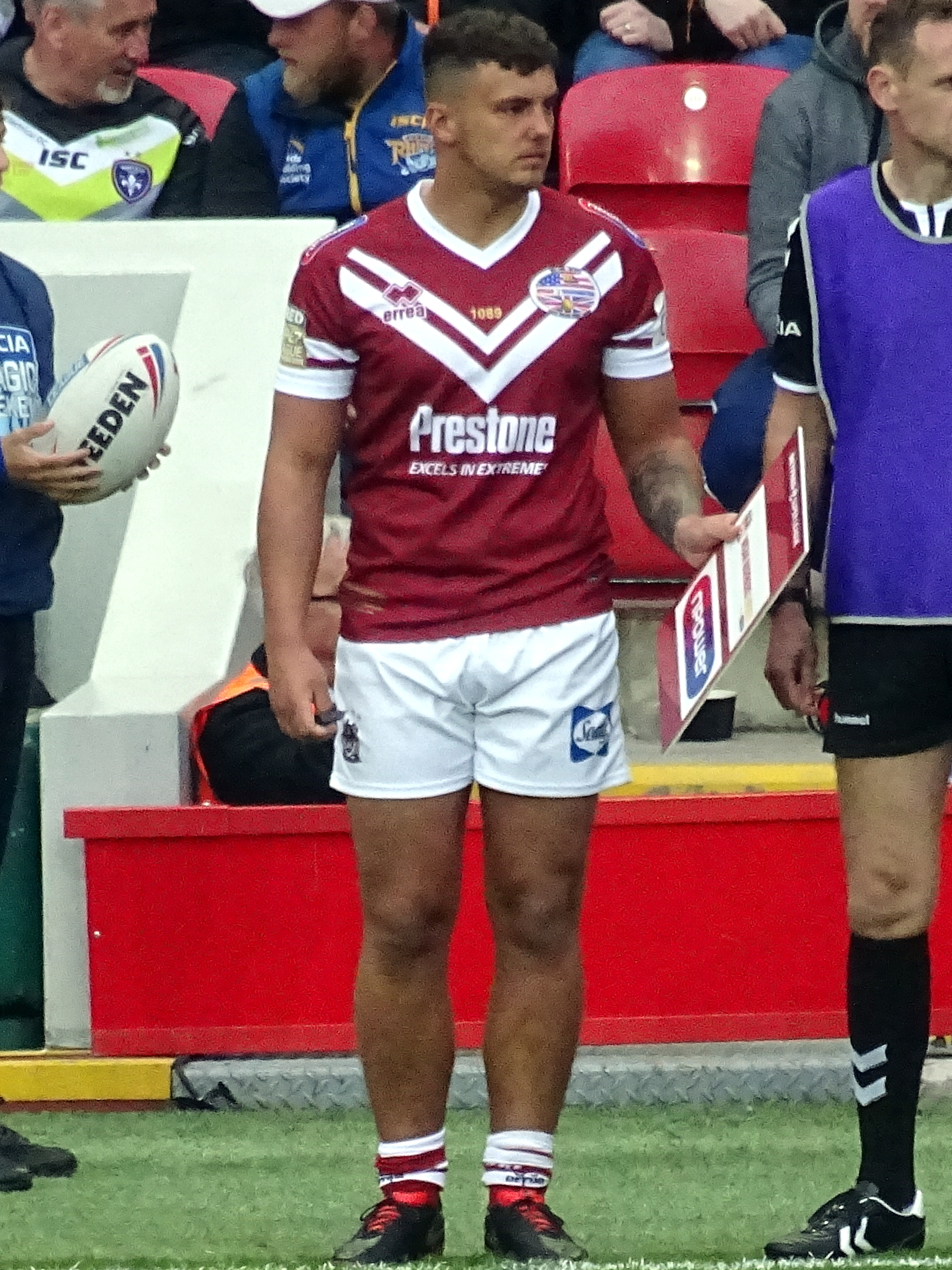

Personal information
- Full name: Oliver Partington
- Born: 3 September 1998 (age 28) Billinge, Merseyside, England
- Height: 6 ft 0 in (1.83 m)
- Weight: 15 st 3 lb (97 kg)

Playing information
- Position: Prop, Loose forward
Club
Years	Team	Pld	T	G	FG	P
2018–22	Wigan Warriors	91	5	0	0	20
2018(loan)	→ Swinton Lions	1	0	0	0	0
2018(loan)	→ London Skolars	2	0	0	0	0
2019(loan)	→ Swinton Lions	3	0	0	0	0
2023–24	Salford Red Devils	45	3	0	0	12
2025	Catalans Dragons	28	0	0	0	0
2026–	Wigan Warriors	28	5	0	0	20
	Total	198	13	0	0	52
Representative
Years	Team	Pld	T	G	FG	P
2019–	England Knights	1	0	0	0	0
- Source: As of 30 September 2025

Oliver Partington (born 3 September 1998) is a professional rugby league footballer who plays as a prop and loose forward for the Wigan Warriors in the Super League and the England Knights at international level.

He has previously played for the Wigan Warriors in the Super League, and spent time on loan from Wigan at the Swinton Lions in the Championship, and the London Skolars in Betfred League 1.

== Background ==
Partington was born in Billinge, Merseyside, England.

== Career ==
=== Wigan Warriors ===
In 2018 he made his Super League début for Wigan against the Castleford Tigers. He played in the 2020 Super League Grand Final which Wigan lost 8-4 against St Helens. On 30 May 2026, he played in Wigan's 2026 Challenge Cup final victory against Hull Kingston Rovers.

=== Salford Red Devils ===
In September 2022 he signed for the Salford Red Devils on a two-year deal. In the 2023 Super League season, Partington played 20 matches for Salford as the club finished 7th on the table and missed the playoffs.

=== Catalans Dragons ===
On 28 June 2024, it was reported that he had signed for Catalans Dragons on a two-year deal.

== International career ==
In 2019 he was selected for the England Knights against Jamaica at Headingley Rugby Stadium.

== Honours ==
=== Wigan Warriors ===
- League Leaders' Shield
  - Winner (1): 2026
- Challenge Cup
  - Winner (1): 2026
