= Taylor Kerr (rugby league) =

English professional rugby league footballer

Personal information
- Full name: Taylor Kerr
- Born: 1 August 2006 (age 19) Wigan, Greater Manchester, England

Playing information
- Position: Loose forward
Club
Years	Team	Pld	T	G	FG	P
2025–	Wigan Warriors	0	0	0	0	0
2025(loan)	→ London Broncos	7	1	0	0	4
2025(loan)	→ Salford Red Devils	1	0	0	0	0
	Total	8	1	0	0	4
- Source: As of 1 June 2026
- Relatives: Brad Dwyer (cousin)

Taylor Kerr (born 1 August 2006) is an English professional rugby league footballer who plays as a loose forward for the Wigan Warriors in the Betfred Super League.

He has spent time on loan from Wigan at the London Broncos in the RFL Championship and the Salford Red Devils in the Super League.

== Background ==
Kerr was born in Wigan, Greater Manchester, England. His cousin Brad Dwyer is a fellow professional rugby league footballer.

He played for Ince Rose Bridge, Orrell St James and Wigan St Judes as a junior. He played for Lancashire in the Origin series.

== Career ==
Kerr scored five tries in 13 appearances for the Wigan Warriors Academy side in 2023 and later joined the first team squad ahead of the 2025 season.

He made his professional debut in February 2025 on loan at the London Broncos against Featherstone Rovers in the Betfred Championship.

In August 2025 Kerr was loaned out by Wigan to the Salford Red Devils, during which time he made his Super League debut for Salford against Hull FC.

== Honours ==
- Challenge Cup
  - Winners (1): 2026
