= 2026 Women's Challenge Cup final =

Rugby league match

2026 Women's Challenge Cup Final
Wigan Warriors	St Helens
54	6
	1	2	Total
WIG	28	26	54
STH	6	0	6
- Date: 30 May 2026
- Stadium: Wembley Stadium
- Location: London, United Kingdom
- Player of the Match: Jenna Foubister (Wigan)
- God Save The King and Abide with Me: Jasmine Faulkner
- Referee: Aaron Moore

Broadcast partners
- Broadcasters: BBC Two

The 2026 Women's Challenge Cup Final, was the 14th final of the Rugby Football League's Women's Challenge Cup knock-out competition. It was held on 30 May 2026, and was the fourth final at Wembley Stadium as part of a double header alongside the men's final.

The final was contested by reigning champions Wigan Warriors, and St Helens. Wigan retained the cup by defeating St Helens 54–6

== Background ==
The 2026 Women's Challenge Cup final was the second meeting between Wigan Warriors and St Helens in the competition final.

Wigan Warriors entered the final as defending champions having defeated St Helens 42–6 in the 2025 final for their first title St Helens' loss in the 2025 final ended their run of four consecutive wins between 2021 and 2024.

== Route to the final ==
=== Wigan Warriors ===
Round	Opposition	Venue	Score
Group Stage	Featherstone Rovers	Post Office Road	6–78
Group Stage	Cardiff Demons	Edge Hall Road	76–6
Quarter-final	London Broncos	Edge Hall Road	110–0
Semi-final	York Valkyrie	Halliwell Jones Stadium	52–0

=== St Helens ===
Round	Opposition	Venue	Score
Group Stage	Huddersfield Giants	Laund Hill	44–14
Group Stage	Catalans Dragons	BrewDog Stadium	62–4
Quarter-final	Barrow Raiders	BrewDog Stadium	68–6
Semi-final	Leeds Rhinos	Eco-Power Stadium	30–14

== Pre-match ==
On 30 April, the RFL announced that soprano Jasmine Faulkner would sing the national anthem and Abide with Me ahead of the match.

== Match details ==
Saturday, 30 May 2026
11:45am BST

Wigan Warriors	54–6	St Helens
Tries: Wilson 6'; E. Hunter 12', 16', 58', 65'; Salihi 23'; Davies 37', 41'; Banks 51'; Wilton 68'; Goals: Rowe (7/10); 7', 13', 18', 24', 42', 67', 69'		Tries: McColm 40'; Goals: Gaskin (1/1) 40'

Wembley Stadium, London
Referee: Aaron Moore
Video referee: Liam Rush
Touch judges: Ryan Cox, Gareth Jones
Player of the Match: Jenna Foubister

Team details
Wigan Warriors		Position	St Helens
Name	Number	Position	Number	Name
Grace Banks 51'	1	FB	1	Rebecca Rotheram
Anna Davies 37', 41'	2	WG	5	Leah Burke
Georgia Wilson 6'	3	CE	4	Amy Hardcastle
Beri Salihi 23', (substituted off) 55'	16	CE	3	Rachael Woosey
Ellise Derbyshire	5	WG	25	Dani McGifford
Isabel Rowe 7', 13', 18', 24', 42', 67', 69'	7	SO	6	Zoe Harris
Jenna Foubister	6	SH	7	Faye Gaskin
Mary Coleman (substituted off) 31', (substituted on) 52'	8	PR	11	Shona Hoyle-Holdsworth (substituted off) 25', (substituted on) 40', (substituted off) 75'
Remi Wilton (substituted off) 28', (substituted on) 57', 68'	19	HK	17	Caitlin Casey (substituted off) 20'
Bethan Dainton (substituted off) 23', (substituted on) 55'	15	PF	16	Erin McDonald (substituted off) 19', (substituted on) 75'
Eva Hunter 12', 16', 58', 65'	11	SR	14	Paige Travis (substituted off) 55', (substituted on) 63'
Cerys Jones	12	SR	12	Emily Rudge (substituted off) 40', (substituted on) 55'
Megan Williams (substituted off) 20', (substituted on) 63'	13	LF	13	Jodie Cunningham
Carys Marsh (substituted on) 28', (substituted off) 57'	9	IN	9	Katie Mottershead (substituted on) 20'
Mia-Jayne Atherton (substituted on) 20'	10	IN	8	Vicky Whitfield (substituted on) 25', (substituted off) 55'
Kelsy Gentles (substituted on) 31', (substituted off) 63'	17	IN	20	Alyx Bridge (substituted on) 55'
Lucie Sams (substituted on) 23', (substituted off) 52'	20	IN	18	Luci McColm (substituted on) 19', 40', (substituted off) 63'
Denis Betts		Coach		Derek Hardman

== Post-match ==
The final was watched by 249,000 on TV, accounting for 5.3% of the audience share.

Reigning Woman of Steel Eva Hunter made history by becoming the first woman to score four tries at Wembley and equalled the record for the number of tries scored in the Women's Challenge Cup final. (Note: tied with Claire McGinnis (2013) and Tara-Jane Stanley (2016)) Isabel Rowe kicked seven goals to repeat her performance in the 2025 final which also equalled the record for the women's final. (Note: tied with Amy Smith (2013) and Tara-Jane Stanley (2016))

Following the game, the men's 2026 Challenge Cup final was contested by Hull Kingston Rovers and Wigan Warriors, in which Wigan's men's side beat Hull KR 40–10 to complete a men's and women's club cup double.
