= Adam Keighran =

Australian rugby league footballer (born 1997)

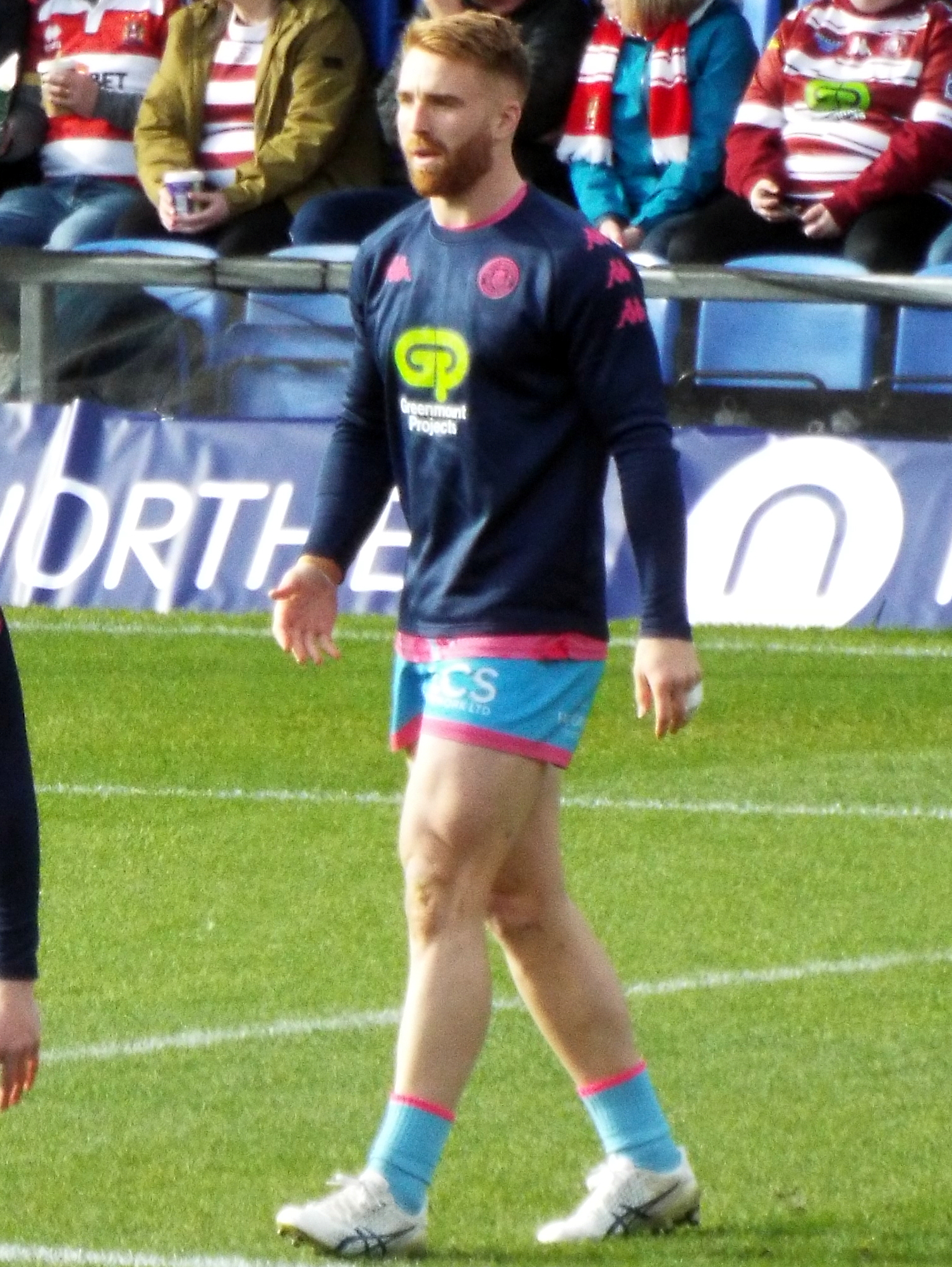

Personal information
- Full name: Adam Keighran
- Born: 24 April 1997 (age 29) Sydney, New South Wales, Australia
- Height: 6 ft 0 in (1.83 m)
- Weight: 14 st 5 lb (91 kg)

Playing information
- Position: Centre, Stand-off, Hooker
Club
Years	Team	Pld	T	G	FG	P
2019–20	New Zealand Warriors	9	4	9	0	34
2021–22	Sydney Roosters	17	4	35	0	86
2023	Catalans Dragons	25	13	74	0	200
2024–	Wigan Warriors	84	37	294	0	736
	Total	135	58	412	0	1056
- Source: As of 10 October 2023

Adam Keighran (born 24 April 1997) is an Australian professional rugby league footballer who plays as a centre for the Wigan Warriors in the Betfred Super League.

He previously played for the New Zealand Warriors and the Sydney Roosters in the National Rugby League. Keighran also played for the Catalans Dragons in the Super League. Earlier in his career he played as a stand-off and hooker.

== Background ==
Keighran was born in Sydney, Australia.

He played his junior rugby league for the Wyong Roos before being signed by the Canterbury-Bankstown Bulldogs.

== Career ==
=== Penrith Panthers reserves ===
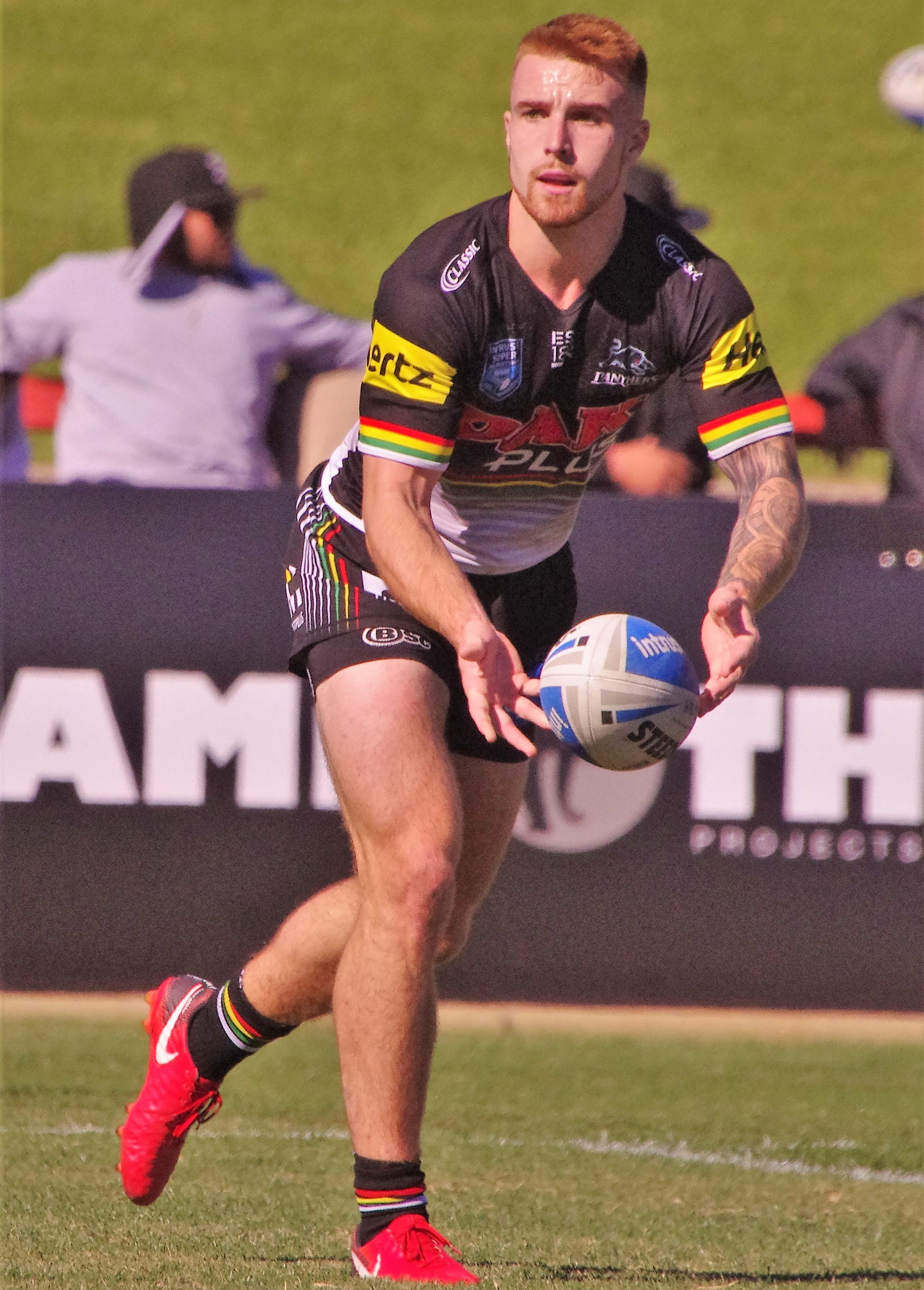
Keighran playing for the Penrith Panthers in 2018

Keighran signed a two-year deal in 2017 with the Penrith Panthers, kicking 80 goals for their New South Wales Cup side in 2018 and was picked as one of two centres of the year despite playing the last 10 games of his season in the halves.

=== New Zealand Warriors ===
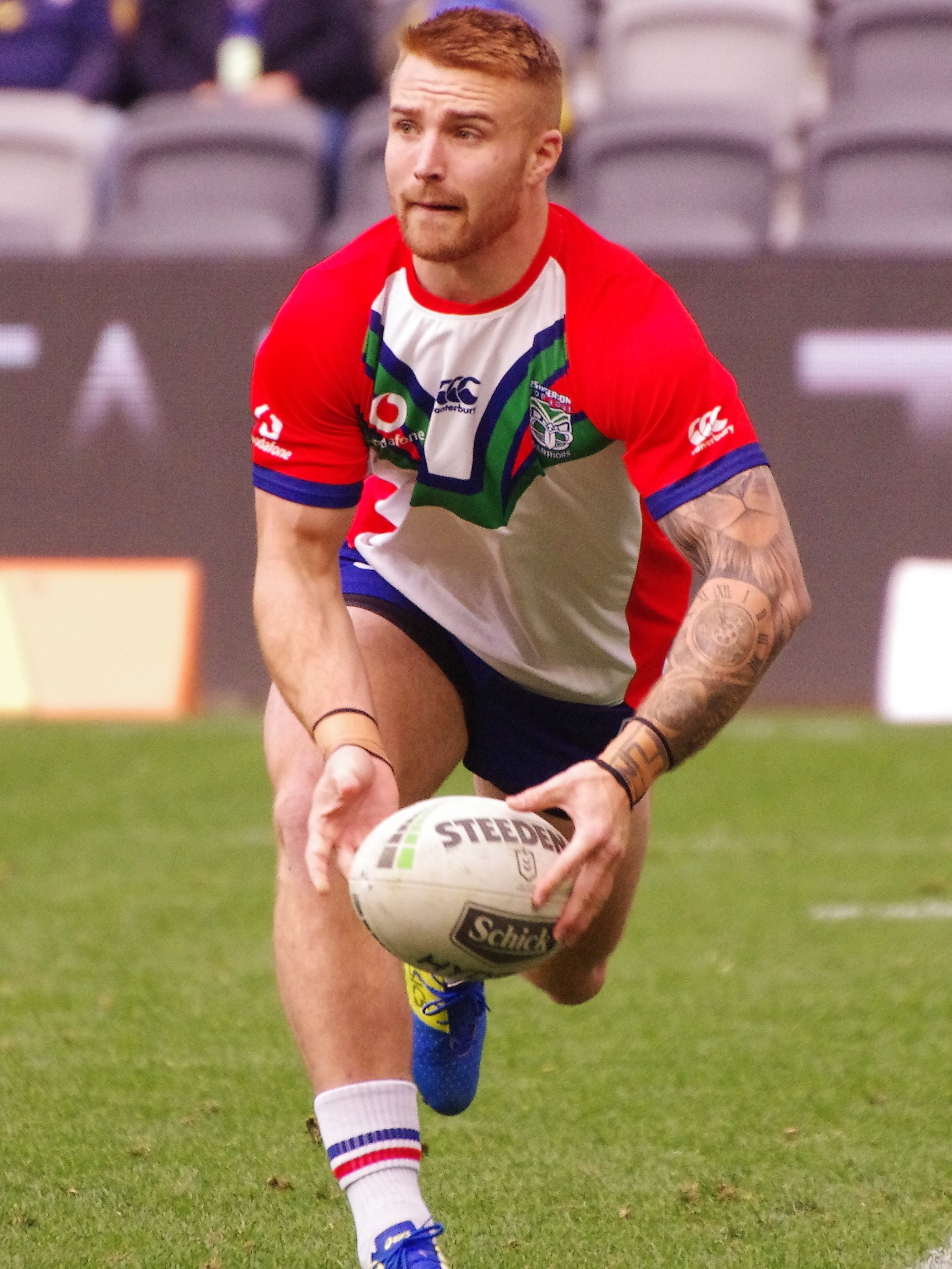
Keighran warming up for the New Zealand Warriors in 2019

In October 2018 he signed a three-year deal with the New Zealand Warriors.

Keighran made his first grade debut in round 1 of the 2019 NRL season playing for the Warriors against the Canterbury-Bankstown Bulldogs, scoring a try in their 40–6 win.

=== Sydney Roosters ===
In November 2020, he signed a two-year deal to join the Sydney Roosters starting in 2021.

In round 1 of the 2021 NRL season, he made his debut for the Sydney Roosters in their 46–4 victory over Manly-Warringah at the Sydney Cricket Ground. In round 25 of the 2021 NRL season, he scored a hat-trick for the Sydney Roosters in a 40–16 victory over Canberra.

He played a total of 15 games for the Sydney Roosters in the 2021 NRL season including the club's two finals matches. The Sydney Roosters would be eliminated from the second week of the finals losing to Manly 42–6.

Keighran only featured in two matches for the Sydney Roosters throughout the 2022 NRL season. Keighran spent the rest of the year playing for the club's NSW Cup feeder team North Sydney.

=== Catalans Dragons ===
On 23 November 2022, Keighran signed a contract to join Super League side the Catalans Dragons ahead of the 2023 Super League season. Keighran made his club debut for Catalans in their round 1 victory over Wakefield Trinity kicking five goals.

In round 12, Keighran scored two tries and kicked five goals for Catalans as they defeated Castleford 46–22.

On 16 July, Keighran signed a two-year deal to join Wigan starting in 2024. In round 20, Keighran scored two tries and kicked four goals as Catalans defeated Salford 42–0.

On 14 October 2023, Keighran played in Catalans 2023 Super League Grand Final loss against Wigan. Keighran became the second player in Super League history to be sin binned during a grand final after he was sent from the field for a dangerous lifting tackle in the first half.

=== Wigan Warriors ===
In round 1 of the 2024 Super League season, Keighran made his club debut for Wigan in their 32–4 victory over Castleford.

On 24 February, Keighran played in Wigan's 2024 World Club Challenge final victory over Penrith. In round 4, Keighran scored one try and kicked ten goals in Wigan's 60–22 victory over the newly promoted London team. In round 13, Keighran was given a straight red card for a dangerous high tackle during Wigan's 19–18 victory over Warrington and subsequently missed the Challenge Cup final. On 12 October, Keighran played in Wigan's 9-2 2024 Super League grand final victory over Hull Kingston Rovers.

In 2025, Keighran suffered a medial collateral ligament injury, ruling him out for four months. In July, he signed a new three-year deal with Wigan. On 9 October 2025, Keighran played in Wigan's 24-6 2025 Super League Grand Final loss against Hull Kingston Rovers. On 30 May 2026, Keighran played in Wigan's 2026 Challenge Cup final victory against Hull Kingston Rovers.

== Honours ==
=== Catalans Dragons ===
- Super League
  - Runner-up (1): 2023
- League Leaders' Shield
  - Runner-up (1): 2023

=== Wigan Warriors ===
- Super League
  - Winners (1): 2024
- League Leaders' Shield
  - Winners (2): 2024, 2026
- Challenge Cup
  - Winners (2): 2024, 2026
- World Club Challenge
  - Winners (1): 2024

=== Records ===
- Joint most points scored in a Challenge Cup final: 20 (2026)
