= Zach Eckersley =

England international rugby league footballer

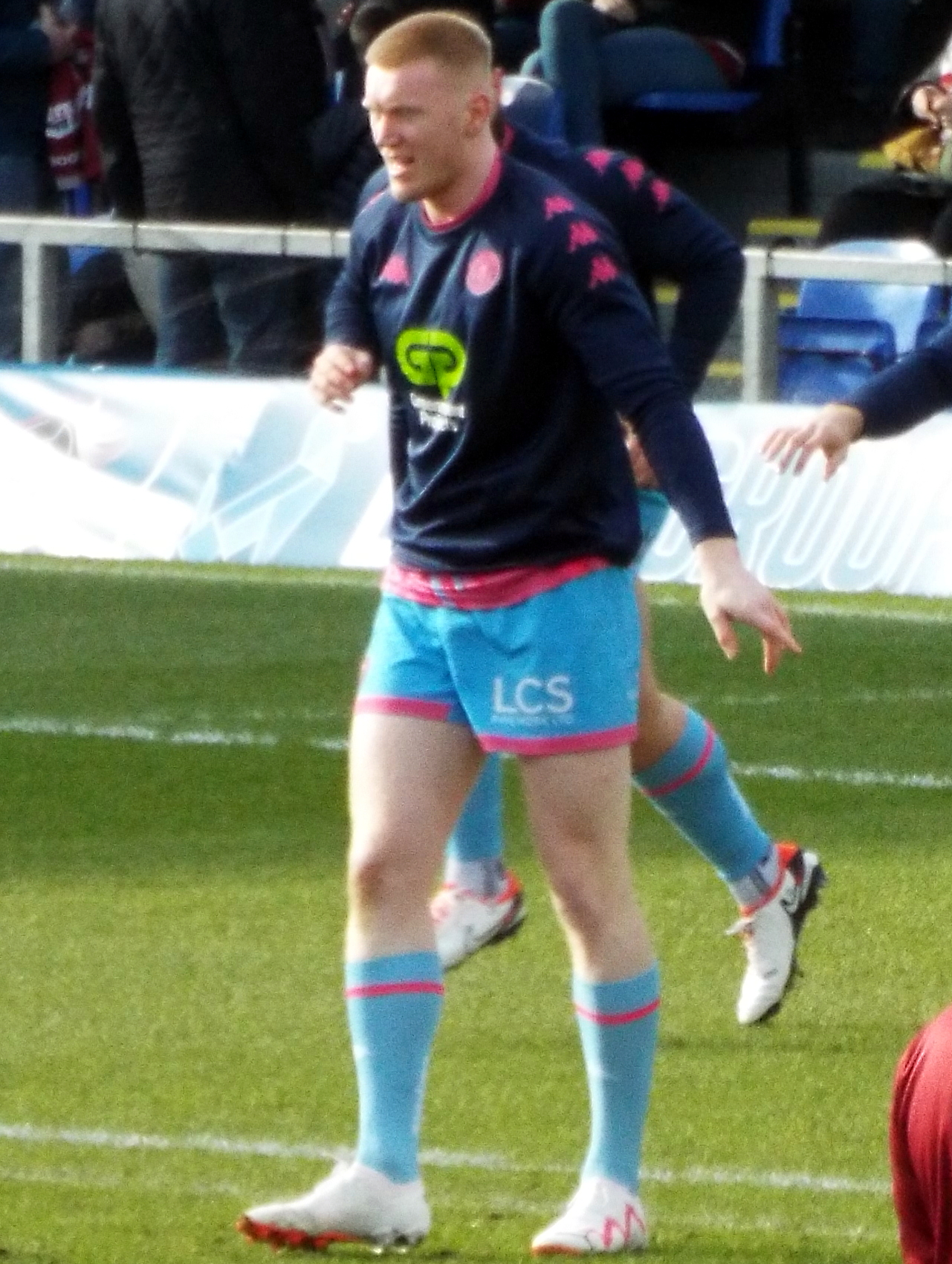

Personal information
- Full name: Zach Eckersley
- Born: 10 November 2003 (age 22) Oldham, Greater Manchester, England
- Height: 6 ft 3 in (1.91 m)
- Weight: 14 st 13 lb (95 kg)

Playing information
- Position: Centre, Fullback, Wing
Club
Years	Team	Pld	T	G	FG	P
2021–	Wigan Warriors	47	33	0	0	144
2023(loan)	→ London Broncos	4	1	0	0	4
2023(loan)	→ Widnes Vikings	8	5	0	0	20
2023(loan)	→ Barrow Raiders	3	0	0	0	0
	Total	62	39	0	0	168
Representative
Years	Team	Pld	T	G	FG	P
2026–	England	1	0	0	0	0
- Source: As of 17 October 2026

Zach Eckersley (born 10 November 2003) is a professional rugby league footballer who plays as a centre and winger for the Wigan Warriors in the Super League.

== Playing career ==
=== Wigan Warriors ===
In August 2022, Eckersley made his Super League début for Wigan against Hull Kingston Rovers.

==== 2023 loans ====
London Broncos

On 10 February 2023 it was announced he would join the London Broncos on an initial one month loan.

Widnes Vikings

On 4 April 2023 it was announced he would join the Widnes Vikings on short-term loan.

Barrow Raiders

On 7 July 2023 it was announced he would join the Barrow Raiders on short-term loan.

==== Return to Wigan ====
On 8 June 2024, Eckersley started in the 2024 Challenge Cup final, scoring Wigan's opening try in the club's 18–8 victory over Warrington. On 30 May 2026, he played in Wigan's 2026 Challenge Cup final victory against Hull Kingston Rovers.

== International ==
He made his England international début in the 2026 Rugby League World Cup 12-30 defeat to Tonga on 17 October 2026

== Honours ==
=== Wigan Warriors ===
- Super League
  - Winners (1): 2024
- League Leaders' Shield
  - Winners (2): 2024, 2026
- Challenge Cup
  - Winners (2): 2024, 2026
- World Club Challenge
  - Winners (1): 2024

=== Individual ===
- Super League Dream Team
  - Selected (1): 2026
