= Brad O'Neill =

England international rugby league footballer

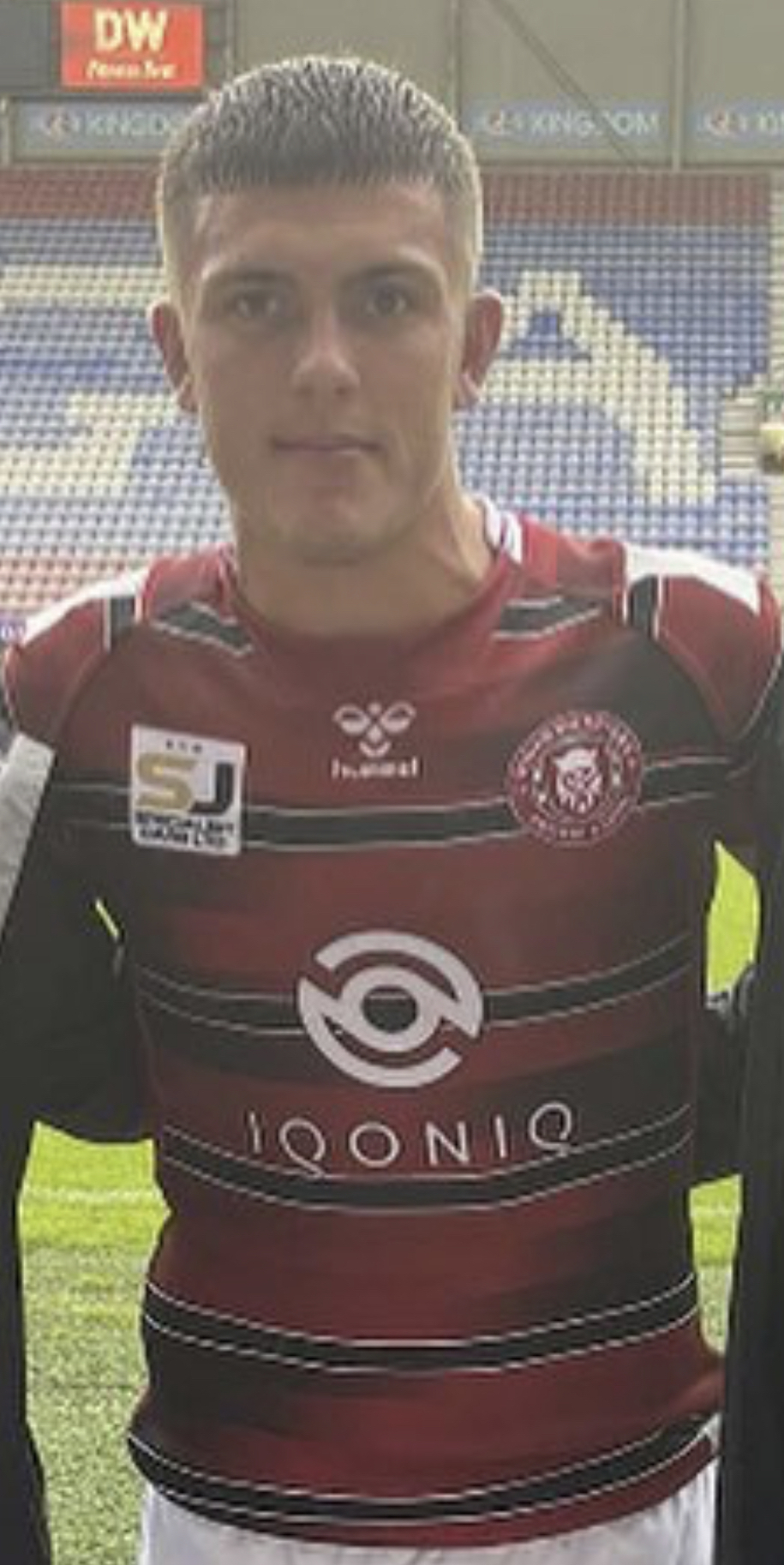

Personal information
- Full name: Bradley O'Neill
- Born: 22 July 2002 (age 24) Leigh, Greater Manchester, England
- Height: 6 ft 0 in (1.83 m)
- Weight: 15 st 6 lb (98 kg)

Playing information
- Position: Hooker, Loose forward
Club
Years	Team	Pld	T	G	FG	P
2021–	Wigan Warriors	123	11	0	0	44
2021(loan)	→ Widnes Vikings	8	2	0	0	8
2022(loan)	→ Newcastle Thunder	4	1	0	0	4
	Total	135	14	0	0	56
Representative
Years	Team	Pld	T	G	FG	P
2024–	England	3	0	0	0	0
- Source: As of 24 October 2026

Brad O'Neill (born 22 July 2002) is an English professional rugby league footballer who plays as a hooker for the Wigan Warriors in the Super League.

== Club career ==
=== Wigan Warriors ===
In 2021 he made his Super League début for Wigan against Wakefield Trinity.

On 28 May 2022, he played for Wigan in their 2022 Challenge Cup Final victory over Huddersfield Giants.

On 14 October 2023, O'Neill played in Wigan's 2023 Super League Grand Final victory over the Catalans Dragons.

On 24 February 2024, O'Neill played in Wigan's 2024 World Club Challenge final victory over Penrith Panthers.

On 8 June 2024, O'Neill played in Wigan's 2024 Challenge Cup final victory over Warrington Wolves.

In July 2024, O'Neill suffered an ACL injury, ruling him out for a minimum of nine months. He returned to the field in March 2025 and made his way back into the squad in round 6 vs Salford. On 9 October 2025, O'Neill played in Wigan's 24–6 2025 Super League Grand Final loss against Hull Kingston Rovers. On 30 May 2026, O'Neill played in Wigan's 2026 Challenge Cup final victory against Hull Kingston Rovers.

On 29 September 2026, O'Neill won the Man of Steel Award as Super League's best player for 2026.

== International career ==
He made his England début on 29 June 2024 against France in Toulouse.

== Honours ==
=== Wigan Warriors ===
- Super League
  - Winners (2): 2023, 2024
- League Leaders' Shield
  - Winners (3): 2023, 2024, 2026
- Challenge Cup
  - Winners (3): 2022, 2024, 2026
- World Club Challenge
  - Winners (1): 2024

=== Individual ===
- Man of Steel:
  - Winner: 2026
- Super League Dream Team
  - Selected (1): 2026
- RLWBA Player of the Year:
  - Winner (1): 2026
