= Jack Farrimond =

English rugby league footballer

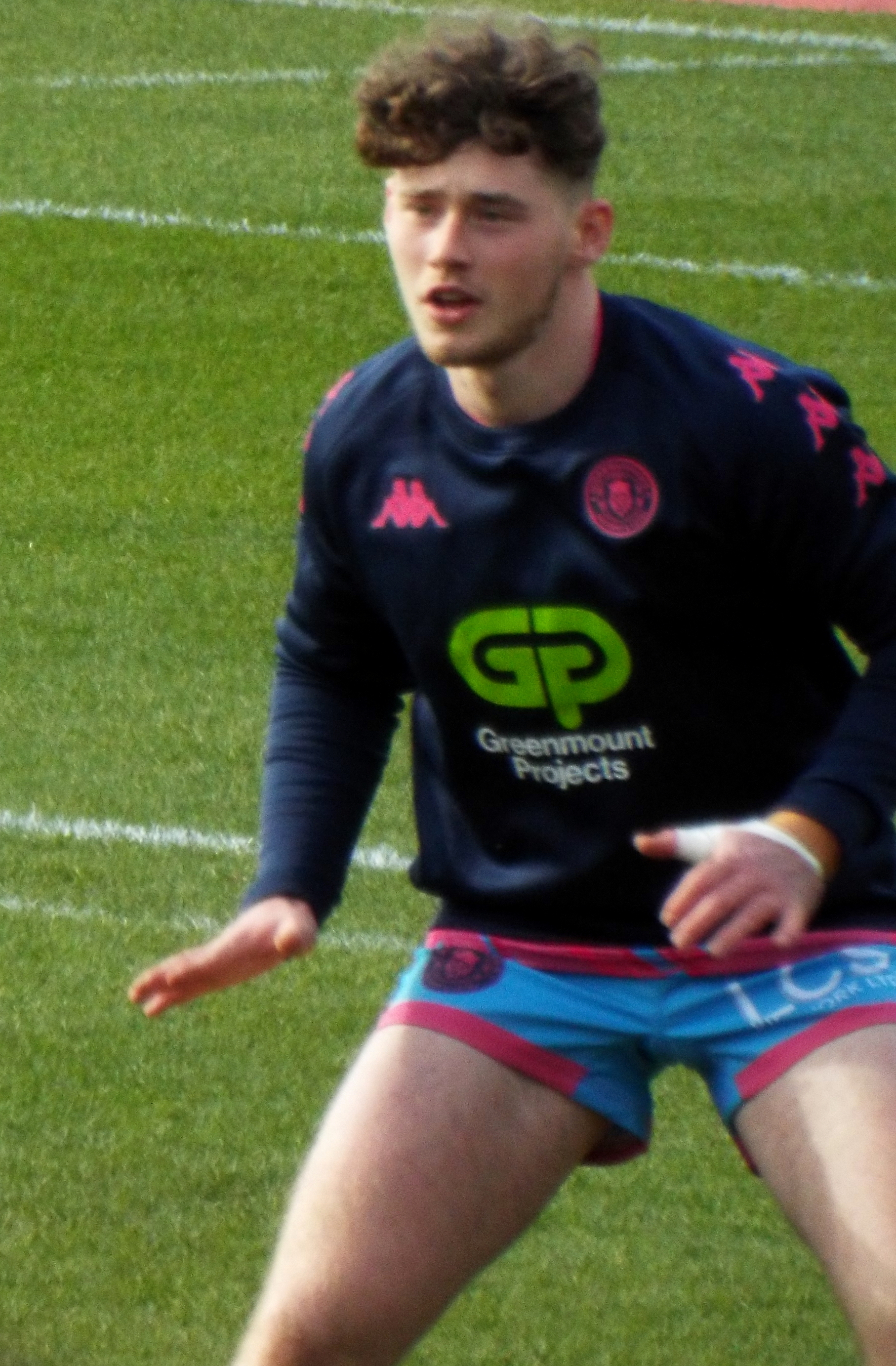

Personal information
- Full name: Jack Farrimond
- Born: 26 October 2005 (age 20) Leigh, Greater Manchester, England
- Height: 5 ft 10 in (1.78 m)
- Weight: 11 st 11 lb (75 kg)

Playing information
- Position: Scrum-half, Stand-off
Club
Years	Team	Pld	T	G	FG	P
2024–	Wigan Warriors	20	13	15	0	82
2025(DR)	→ London Broncos	1	1	0	0	4
	Total	21	14	15	0	86
- Source: As of 14 October 2025

Jack Farrimond is a professional rugby league footballer who plays as a scrum-half or stand-off for the Wigan Warriors in the Super League.

He has previously spent time at the London Broncos in the RFL Championship on DR loan from Wigan.

== Background ==
Jack Farrimond was born in Leigh in 2005 and began playing rugby league with amateur club Leigh Miners Rangers from age 5, the club which his dad played and currently coaches. He was signed by Wigan Warriors through their scholarship programme in 2022.

== Career ==
=== Wigan Warriors ===
Jack Farrimond made his Super League début for Wigan on 9 March 2024 against the London Broncos. He played again in the return fixture on 21 June, this time scoring two tries and six out of six conversions. Farrimond played in Wigan's Magic Weekend derby day victory 20–0 victory over St Helens. He was praised by head coach and media for his performance, scoring the second try of the game. On 30 May 2026, he played in Wigan's 2026 Challenge Cup final victory against Hull Kingston Rovers. During 2026 Magic Weekend, Farrimond suffered a hamstring injury ruling him out for three months.

=== London Broncos (DR) ===
On 9 May 2025 it was reported that he had signed for London Broncos in the RFL Championship on DR loan

== Personal life ==
Jack Farrimond supports Leigh Leopards.

He coaches Leigh Miners Rangers under-10s.

== Honours ==
=== Academy level ===
==== Wigan Warriors ====
- Reserves Grand Final
  - Winners (1): 2023

==== Lancashire ====
- Academy Origin
  - Winners (1): 2023

=== Wigan Warriors ===
- Super League
  - Winner (1): 2024
- League Leaders' Shield
  - Winner (2): 2024, 2026
- Challenge Cup
  - Winner (1): 2026

=== Individual ===
- Edwards-Johnson Memorial trophy
  - Winner: 2023
- Lance Todd Trophy
  - Winner: 2026
