= Noah Hodkinson =

English professional rugby league footballer

Personal information
- Full name: Noah Hodkinson
- Born: 29 November 2005 (age 20) Bolton, Greater Manchester, England
- Height: 5 ft 9 in (1.75 m)

Playing information
- Position: Fullback, Wing
Club
Years	Team	Pld	T	G	FG	P
2025–	Wigan Warriors	12	15	1	0	62
2025(loan)	→ Widnes Vikings	2	0	0	0	0
2026(loan)	→ Salford	1	2	0	0	8
	Total	15	17	1	0	70
- Source: As of 21 June 2026

Noah Hodkinson (born 29 November 2005) is an English professional rugby league footballer who plays as a fullback or winger for the Wigan Warriors in the Betfred Super League.

He has spent time on loan from Wigan at the Widnes Vikings and Salford in the RFL Championship.

== Background ==
Hodkinson was born in Bolton, Greater Manchester and raised in Leigh, Greater Manchester.

He played for Hindley ARLFC and Leigh Miners Rangers as a junior.

He gained a Wigan Warriors scholarship in 2021 and was part of the Wigan Academy side that won the 2023 Academy Grand Final.

== Career ==
Hodkinson signed his first professional contract with Wigan in 2025, and made his professional debut in February 2025 during a two week loan to Widnes Vikings against the Sheffield Eagles in the Championship.

In February 2026 he made he played for Salford on loan in the Championship against Hunslet.

In March 2026 Hodkinson made his Wigan Warriors debut in the Challenge Cup against the Bradford Bulls. He scored a hat-trick for Wigan in their May 2026 round 10 Super League 38–14 victory over Bradford. On 30 May 2026, he played in Wigan's 2026 Challenge Cup final victory against Hull Kingston Rovers.

== Honours ==
=== Wigan Warriors ===
- League Leaders' Shield
  - Winner (1): 2026
