= Jacob Douglas (rugby league) =

English professional rugby league footballer

Personal information
- Full name: Jacob Douglas
- Born: 3 March 2004 (age 22) Oldham, Greater Manchester, England

Playing information
- Position: Wing
Club
Years	Team	Pld	T	G	FG	P
2023–25	Wigan Warriors	8	4	0	0	16
2023(loan)	→ Whitehaven	3	2	0	0	8
2023(loan)	→ Oldham	1	0	0	0	0
2024(loan)	→ Bradford Bulls	2	0	0	0	0
2024(loan)	→ Barrow Raiders	5	0	0	0	0
2025(loan)	→ Oldham	2	0	0	0	0
2026–	St Helens	1	1	0	0	4
2026 (loan)	→ Huddersfield Giants	4	2	0	0	8
2026 (loan)	→ Salford	2	0	0	0	0
	Total	28	9	0	0	36
- Source: As of 20 August 2026

Jacob Douglas (born 3 March 2004) is an English professional rugby league footballer who plays as a winger for St Helens in the Betfred Super League.

He has played for the Wigan Warriors in the Super League. He spent time on loan from Wigan at Whitehaven in the RFL Championship, as well as Oldham in RFL League One and in the Championship. Douglas has also played on loan at the Bradford Bulls and the Barrow Raiders in the second tier.

== Background ==
Douglas was born in Oldham, Greater Manchester, England.

He played for the Waterhead Warriors as a junior.

In 2019, he joined the Warriors’ Scholarship and Academy system, and into the Wigan first team ahead of the 2023 season.

== Career ==
=== Wigan Warriors ===
Douglas made his professional debut in February 2023 on loan at Whitehaven against the London Broncos in the Championship.

In June 2024 he made his Wigan Warriors debut in the Super League against the Warrington Wolves.

=== St Helens ===
Douglas joined arch rivals St Helens on a three-year deal following the conclusion of his Wigan deal at the end of the 2025 Super League season.

He made a try-scoring debut on 27 June 2026 in the 10-40 win over Bradford Bulls

=== Huddersfield Giants (loan) ===
On 25 March 2026 it was reported that he had signed for Huddersfield Giants in the Super League on season-long loan

On 11 May 2026 it was reported that St Helens had recalled Douglas from his loan spell.

=== Salford RLFC (loan) ===
On 21 May 2026 it was reported that he had joined Salford in the Championship on a short-term loan.
