= Kian McDermott =

English professional rugby league footballer

Personal information
- Full name: Kian McDermott
- Born: 14 February 2006 (age 20) Wigan, Greater Manchester, England

Playing information
- Position: Prop
Club
Years	Team	Pld	T	G	FG	P
2025–	Wigan Warriors	16	2	0	0	8
2025(loan)	→ London Broncos	9	0	0	0	0
	Total	25	2	0	0	8
- Source: As of 11 December 2025

Kian McDermott (born 14 February 2006) is an English professional rugby league footballer who plays as a prop for the Wigan Warriors in the Betfred Super League.

He has spent time on loan from Wigan at the London Broncos in the RFL Championship.

== Background ==
McDermott was born in Wigan, Greater Manchester, England. He studied at Wigan and Leigh College.

He played for Wigan St Patricks as a junior. He played for Lancashire in the Origin series. He was called up to the England Academy squad in 2023.

== Career ==
McDermott the made his professional debut in January 2025 on loan at the London Broncos against the Goole Vikings in the 2025 Challenge Cup.

In May 2025 he made his Wigan Warriors debut in the Super League against the Salford Red Devils.

== Honours ==
=== Wigan Warriors ===
- League Leaders' Shield
  - Winner (1): 2026
