= Sam Walters (rugby league) =

England international rugby league footballer

Personal information
- Full name: Sam Walters
- Born: 25 December 2000 (age 25) Liverpool, Merseyside, England
- Height: 6 ft 7 in (2.01 m)
- Weight: 17 st 5 lb (110 kg)

Playing information
- Position: Second-row, Prop
Club
Years	Team	Pld	T	G	FG	P
2019–23	Leeds Rhinos	42	9	0	0	36
2019(loan)	→ Batley Bulldogs	1	1	0	0	4
2022(loan)	→ Bradford Bulls	2	0	0	0	0
2023(loan)	→ Bradford Bulls	1	1	0	0	4
2024–	Wigan Warriors	36	8	0	0	24
	Total	82	19	0	0	68
Representative
Years	Team	Pld	T	G	FG	P
2026–	England	3	0	0	0	0
- Source: As of 18 November 2026

Sam Walters (born 25 December 2000) is a professional rugby league footballer who plays as a second-row forward for the Wigan Warriors in the Super League.

He has spent time on loan from Leeds at the Batley Bulldogs in the Championship.

== Background ==
Walters played his amateur rugby league with the Halton Farnworth Hornets

== Career ==
=== Leeds Rhinos ===
Walters made his Super League début in round 14 of the 2020 Super League season for Leeds against the Catalans Dragons.

Walters has also played one game for Batley whilst out on loan where he scored against Leigh.

On 24 September 2022, Walters played for Leeds in their 24–12 loss to St Helens RFC in the 2022 Super League Grand Final.

Walters played 17 matches for Leeds in the 2023 Super League season as the club finished 8th on the table and missed the playoffs.

=== Wigan Warriors ===
Ahead of the 2024 season, Walters joined Wigan Warriors on a three-year deal.

In June 2025, he signed a new four-year deal with the club. On 9 October 2025, Walters played in Wigan's 24-6 2025 Super League Grand Final loss against Hull Kingston Rovers. On 30 May 2026, Walters played in Wigan's 2026 Challenge Cup final victory against Hull Kingston Rovers.

=== International ===
He made his England international début in the 2026 Rugby League World Cup 12–30 defeat to Tonga on 17 October 2026.

== Honours ==
=== Wigan Warriors ===
- Super League
  - Winner (1): 2024
- League Leaders' Shield
  - Winner (2): 2024, 2026
- Challenge Cup
  - Winner (2): 2024, 2026
