= Matt Peet =

English professional RL coach and former rugby league footballer

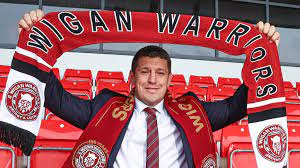

Personal information
- Full name: Matthew Thomas Peet
- Born: 15 April 1984 (age 42) Wigan, Greater Manchester, England

Coaching information
Club
Years	Team	Gms	W	D	L	W%
2022–	Wigan Warriors	150	116	0	34	77
- Source: As of 3 November 2026

Matthew Peet (born 15 April 1984) is an English professional rugby league coach who is the head coach of the Wigan Warriors in the Super League.

== Background ==
Peet was born in Wigan and played amateur rugby league for many years around the area. After failing to secure a professional contract, he switched direction and studied English at Manchester Metropolitan University. Upon graduation and completion of his degree in 2005, he returned to rugby league focusing on coaching.

== Career ==
Peet began coaching at amateur level with the senior sides of both Westhoughton Lions and Wigan St Patricks, before joining Wigan in 2008 as a part time Scholarship coach. Peet went on to hold a number of roles within the club's youth ranks before being appointed to his first full-time position as the club's youth performance coach. In 2013, he was promoted to Head of Youth Performance, a role he would hold until 2018. Wigan's youth sides would win their respective Grand Finals six out of the seven years he was in the role. During this time he also held the dual role of England Rugby League Academy assistant coach from 2013–2016.

In 2018, he switched codes to rugby union, joining the Sale Sharks as High Performance Manager, before returning to Wigan a year later as Assistant Coach to then-Head Coach, Adrian Lam.

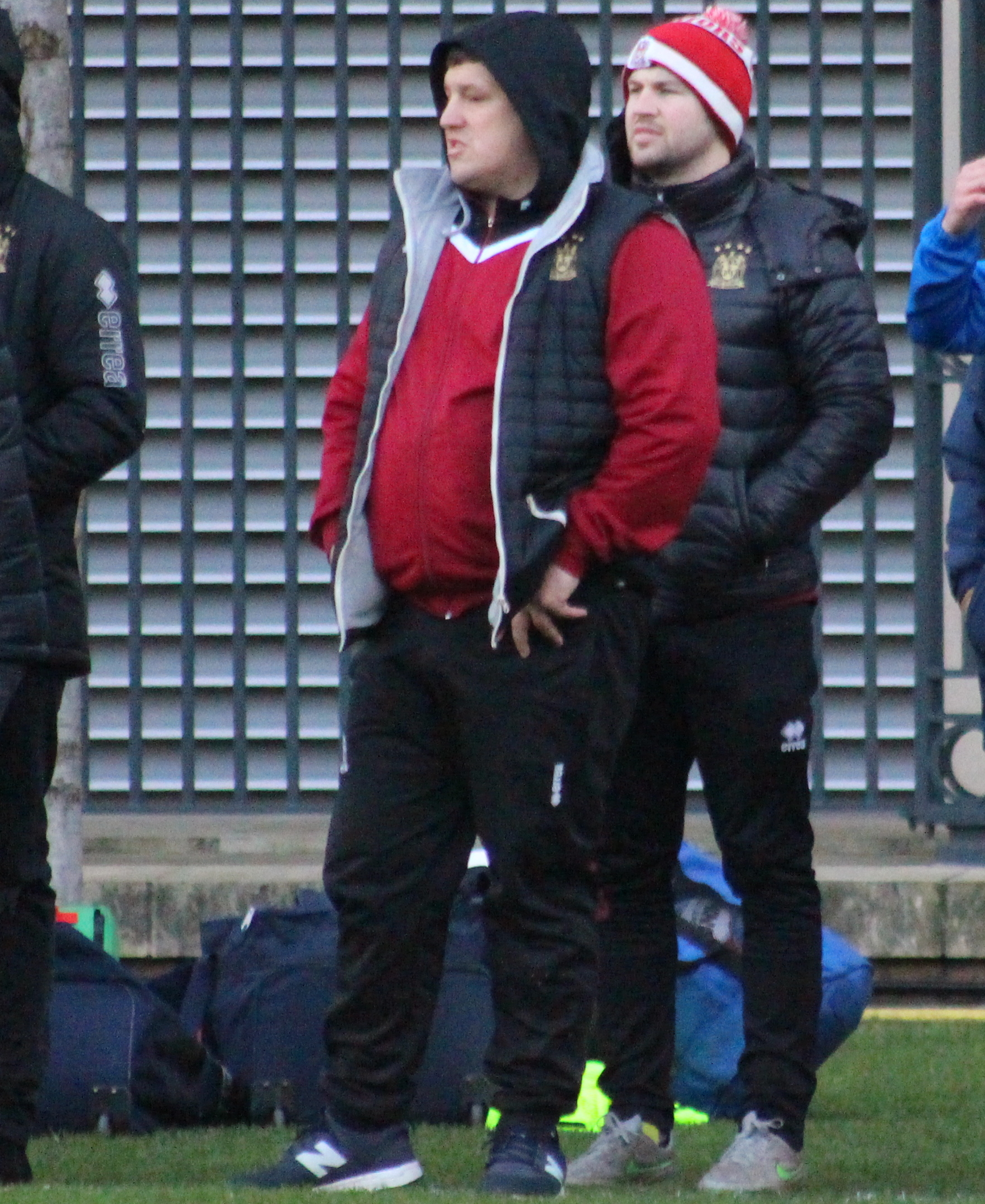
Peet as part of the Wigan coaching staff in 2018

On 5 October 2021, following the departure of Lam, Peet was promoted to head coach. On 28 May 2022, in his inaugural season as head coach, Peet coached Wigan to victory in the 2022 Challenge Cup Final over Huddersfield and to second place finish at the end of the 2022 regular season. However, the club did not reach the grand final, losing 20–8 against Leeds in the semi-final. In September 2022, Peet was awarded Super League Coach of the Year at the 2022 Super League Awards.

The following season, Wigan won the League Leaders' Shield after winning 20 games of 27 in regular season; and, on 14 October, Peet coached Wigan to their 2023 Super League Grand Final victory over the Catalans Dragons securing the league title for the first time since 2018 and qualifying for the World Club Challenge. Peet's Wigan hosted the match in their opening home game of 2024, winning the match 16–12 over Penrith to win the 2024 World Club Challenge, meaning Peet had won every honour available to him as Wigan coach. Following the game, Sky Sports compared Peet's impact on the club to that of Alex Ferguson, Pep Guardiola and Jürgen Klopp.

On 20 March 2024, Peet signed a new seven-year contract, keeping him at the club until 2030. On 8 June 2024, Peet coached Wigan to victory in the 2024 Challenge Cup final over Warrington. On 12 October 2024, Peet coached Wigan in their 9-2 2024 Super League grand final victory over Hull Kingston Rovers. On 9 October 2025, Peet coached Wigan in their 24-6 Super League Grand Final loss against Hull Kingston Rovers. In April 2026, Peet claimed that arch-rivals St Helens had lost their identity following Wigan's 32-0 Challenge Cup semi-final victory. Peet referenced the Good Friday match earlier in the year which St Helens won saying to the media "We spoke about it in the group today. “The St Helens lads – when a loan player scored in front of them (the Wigan fans on Good Friday) – celebrated it like it was a fantastic moment in their history.I think it shows that they’ve lost their identity". On 30 May 2026, Peet coached Wigan in their 2026 Challenge Cup final victory against Hull Kingston Rovers.

== Honours ==
=== As head coach ===
==== Wigan Warriors ====
- Super League
  - Winner: 2023, 2024
- League Leaders' Shield
  - Winner: 2023, 2024, 2026
- Challenge Cup
  - Winner: 2022, 2024, 2026
- World Club Challenge
  - Winner: 2024

==== Individual ====
- Super League Coach of the Year
  - Winner: 2022, 2026
- SJA Committee Award
  - Winner: 2024 (Note: Rugby League's first outright winner of the award.)
