= 2026 Challenge Cup =

British rugby league knockout tournament

- Duration: 7 rounds
- Number of teams: 67
- Winners: Wigan Warriors
- Runners-up: Hull Kingston Rovers

The 2026 Challenge Cup, known for sponsorship reasons as the 2026 Betfred Challenge Cup, is the 125th staging of the Challenge Cup, the main rugby league knockout cup tournament in British rugby league, run by the Rugby Football League (RFL).

== Background ==
The competition retains the seven-round format introduced in 2025. The first round will again be contested solely by community clubs. The Championship clubs join the competition in the second round and the Super League clubs in the third round. However, for 2026, the first and second rounds will be played with clubs allocated to one of three regions, with games being played on a regional basis. This change has been introduced in an effort to reduce costs and an attempt to increase interest in the early rounds of the competition.

As in 2025, the Super League clubs will be drawn away in the third round.

The competition starts in January 2026, and will conclude with the final on 30 May at Wembley Stadium.

Toulouse Olympique declined to take part, as in previous years.

On 9 January 2026, Featherstone Rovers were excluded from the competition due to the ongoing financial difficulties at the club. As the draw for the first and second rounds had already been made by this date, Featherstone's opponent in the second round, Lock Lane were given a bye through to the third round.

== Format and dates ==
Challenge Cup competition format
Round	Date	Clubs involved this round	Winners from previous round	New entries this round	Leagues entering at this round
Round 1	10–12 January	34	None	34	34 UK based community teams
Round 2	24–25 January	37 (Note: One team has a bye due to the exclusion of Featherstone Rovers)	17	20	All teams from the Championship (20)
Round 3	6–8 February	32	19	13	13 of the 14 teams from the Super League (all except Toulouse Olympique)
Round 4	14–15 March	16	16	None	
Quarter-finals	11–12 April	8	8	None	
Semi-finals	9–10 May	4	4	None	
Final	30 May	2	2	None	

The 34 clubs in the first round will be allocated to one of three regions, North West, Yorkshire and National. Most of the clubs are from the National Conference League (NCL) but also included are the three armed services clubs, GB Police, one each from the Welsh and Irish leagues, four from the Southern Conference League, one from the London league and one from the Midlands.

St Helens based club, Haresfinch, were originally included in the competition but withdrew before the first-round matches were played. Their place was taken by Oldham St Annes.

=== North West region ===
There will be 12 clubs in the North West region who will play six ties in the first round; Blackbrook, GB Police, Ince Rose Bridge, Leigh Miners Rangers, Oldham St Annes, Orrell St James, Rochdale Mayfield, Seaton Rangers, Siddal, Thatto Heath Crusaders, Waterhead, and Wigan St Judes.

In the second round, they will be joined by eight Championship clubs; Barrow Raiders, Oldham, Rochdale Hornets, Salford, Swinton Lions, Whitehaven, Widnes Vikings and Workington Town to play seven ties in the second round.

=== Yorkshire region ===
The Yorkshire region will also comprise 12 clubs playing six ties in the first round; Brighouse Rangers, Dewsbury Moor, Heworth, Hunslet ARLFC, King Cross Park, Lock Lane, Mirfield Spartans, Royal Air Force, Stanningley Rangers, West Hull, Woodhouse and York Acorn.

Nine Championship clubs; Batley Bulldogs, Dewsbury Rams, Doncaster, Goole Vikings, Halifax Panthers, Hunslet, Keighley Cougars, Newcastle Thunder and Sheffield Eagles join the six community clubs to play eight ties in the second round.

=== National region ===
The National region will contain 10 clubs playing five first-round ties; Aberavon Fighting Irish, Bedford Tigers, British Army, Broncos, Hammersmith Hills Hoists, London Chargers, Medway Dragons, Royal Navy, Telford Raiders and Wests Warriors.

The five first-round winners will be joined in the second round by London Broncos, Midlands Hurricanes and North Wales Crusaders to play four ties in the second round.

== First round ==
The draws for the first and second rounds were made on 24 November 2025.

Number of teams per tier remaining in competition at start of round 1
Super League (Note: Super League teams joined the competition in the third round)	Championship (Note: Championship clubs joined the competition in the second round)	Non-League	Total
13 / 13	20 / 20	34 / 34	67 / 67

Challenge Cup round 1 fixtures
Home	Score	Away	Match Information
Home	Score	Away	Date and Time	Venue	Referee	Attendance (Note: Attendances not recorded for matches only involving amateur teams)
Royal Navy	4–18	Hammersmith Hills Hoists	10 January 2026, 13:00	United Services Recreation Ground	O. Maddock	not recorded
Hunslet ARLFC	48–6	York Acorn	10 January 2026, 13:30	Hunslet Oval	M. Clayton	not recorded
Orrell St James	34–0	Oldham St Annes	10 January 2026, 13:30	Bankes Avenue Playing Fields	L. Breheny	not recorded
Blackbrook	52–6	GB Police	10 January 2026, 14:00	Boardmans Lane	J. Hughes	not recorded
British Army	12–24	Wests Warriors	10 January 2026, 14:00	Army Rugby Stadium	S. Jenkinson	not recorded
Thatto Heath Crusaders	78–10	Seaton Rangers	10 January 2026, 14:00	Close Street	T. Bell	not recorded
Banbridge Broncos	26–32	Aberavon Fighting Irish	11 January 2026, 13:30	Chambers Park	T. Topping-Higson	not recorded
Bedford Tigers	36–6	Medway Dragons	11 January 2026, 14:30	Putnoe Woods	O. Salmon	not recorded
Heworth	C–C	RAF	Tie conceded by the RAF as they were unable to raise a team for the rescheduled fixture on 17 January.			not recorded
Telford Raiders	18–38	London Chargers	17 January 2026, 13:00 (Note: Postponed from 10 January due to frozen pitch.)	The Old Showground	S. Houghton	not recorded
Brighouse Rangers	6–42	Lock Lane	17 January 2026, 13:30	Brighouse Sports Club	R. Schofield	not recorded
Stanningley	24–22	Dewsbury Moor	17 January 2026, 13:30	The Arthur Miller Stadium	F. Lincoln	not recorded
Woodhouse Warriors	4–36	Mirfield Spartans	17 January 2026, 13:30	Buslingthorpe Vale	S. Quarmby	not recorded
King Cross Park	12–42	West Hull	17 January 2026, 14:00	Hopwood Lane	J. Stearne	not recorded
Rochdale Mayfield	12–18	Ince Rose Bridge	17 January 2026, 14:00	Mayfield Sports Centre	J. Pemberton	not recorded
Wigan St Judes	17–12	Leigh Miners Rangers	17 January 2026, 14:00	Parsons Meadow	L. Breheny	not recorded
Siddal	14–22	Waterhead Warriors	18 January 2026, 13:30 (Note: Postponed from 11 January due to an unfit pitch.)	Exley Lane	L. Seal	not recorded

== Second round ==
Number of teams per tier remaining in competition at start of round 2
Super League	Championship	Non-League	Total
13 / 13	20 / 20	17 / 34	50 / 67

Challenge Cup round 2 fixtures
Home	Score	Away	Match Information
Home	Score	Away	Date and Time	Venue	Referee	Attendance
Lock Lane	C–C	Featherstone Rovers	Tie cancelled due to the termination of Featherstone Rovers's RFL membership following the club's entry in administration. Lock Lane received a bye to the third round.
Heworth	0–66	Keighley Cougars	24 January 2026, 13:30	Elmpark Way	L. Seal	not recorded
Stanningley	0–44	Hunslet	24 January 2026, 13:30	The Arthur Miller Stadium	J. Pemberton	950
Ince Rose Bridge	26–44	Swinton Lions	24 January 2026, 14:00	Pinfold Street	D. Arnold	1,017
Wigan St Judes	4–76	Barrow Raiders	24 January 2026, 14:00	Parsons Meadow	F. Lincoln	not recorded
Sheffield Eagles	18–6	Whitehaven	24 January 2026, 14:30	Steel City Stadium	T. Jones	427
Hammersmith Hills Hoists	10–42	Salford	24 January 2026, 18:00	Dukes Meadows	M. McKelvey	not recorded
Thatto Heath Crusaders	0–76	Widnes Vikings	25 January 2026, 13:00	Close Street	R. Cox	1,400
Waterhead Warriors	6–60	Rochdale Hornets	25 January 2026, 13:30	Manor Park	K. Moore	not recorded
Batley Bulldogs	32–10	Hunslet ARLFC	25 January 2026, 14:00	Mount Pleasant	L. Bland	not recorded
Blackbrook	6–28	Workington Town	25 January 2026, 14:00	Boardmans Lane	A. Williams	not recorded
Dewsbury Rams	32–10	West Hull	25 January 2026, 14:00	Crown Flatt	C. Hughes	not recorded
London Broncos	86–0	Wests Warriors	25 January 2026, 14:00	Athletic Ground	A. Belafonte	not recorded
North Wales Crusaders	110–0	Bedford Tigers	25 January 2026, 14:30	Eirias Stadium	S. Jenkinson	289
Doncaster	24–22	Newcastle Thunder	25 January 2026, 15:00	Eco-Power Stadium	M. Lynn	843
Halifax Panthers	88–0	London Chargers	25 January 2026, 15:00	The Shay	L. Breheny	676
Mirfield Spartans	4–58	Goole Vikings	25 January 2026, 15:00	Victoria Pleasure Grounds (Note: Mirfield ceded home advantage.)	J. Hughes	not recorded
Oldham	58–0	Orrell St James	25 January 2026, 15:00	Bower Fold	S. Mikalauskas	671
Midlands Hurricanes	110–0	Aberavon Fighting Irish	25 January 2026, 17:00	Avery Fields	M. Clayton	200

== Third round ==
The third round draw was made on 12 January 2026.

Number of teams per tier remaining in competition at start of round 3
Super League	Championship	Non-League	Total
13 / 13	18 / 20	1 / 34	32 / 67

Challenge Cup round 3 fixtures
Home	Score	Away	Match Information
Home	Score	Away	Date and Time	Venue	Referee	Attendance
Hunslet	6–52	Huddersfield Giants	6 February 2026, 19:00	South Leeds Stadium	D. Arnold	990
Sheffield Eagles	6–34	Warrington Wolves	6 February 2026, 19:30	Halliwell Jones Stadium (Note: Sheffield ceded home advantage.)	S. Mikalauskas	2,908
Workington Town	2–98	St Helens	6 February 2026, 19:30	Derwent Park	L. Rush	4,129
Lock Lane	0–104	Hull KR	6 February 2026, 20:00	Craven Park (Note: Lock Lane ceded home advantage.)	J. Smith
Salford	0–60	Hull FC	6 February 2026, 20:00	CorpAcq Stadium	M. Lynn	1,976
Doncaster	0–14	Castleford Tigers	7 February 2026, 14:00	Eco-Power Stadium	T. Grant	2,537
Widnes Vikings	12–25	Leeds Rhinos	7 February 2026, 15:00	Halton Stadium	L. Moore	2,977
Barrow Raiders	6–32	York Knights	7 February 2026, 18:00	Craven Park	K. Moore	1,389
North Wales Crusaders	6–60	Leigh Leopards	7 February 2026, 19:00	Eirias Stadium	J. Vella	1,899
Batley Bulldogs	4–56	Catalans Dragons	8 February 2026, 14:00	Mount Pleasant	R. Cox	703
Halifax Panthers	14–18	Goole Vikings	8 February 2026, 15:00	The Shay	L. Bland
Keighley Cougars	18–14	Midlands Hurricanes	8 February 2026, 15:00	Cougar Park	C. Hughes	634
London Broncos	8–26	Bradford Bulls	8 February 2026, 15:00	Plough Lane	M. Griffiths	3,477
Oldham	46–0	Dewsbury Rams	8 February 2026, 15:00	Bower Fold	M. McKelvey	741
Rochdale Hornets	0–83	Wigan Warriors	8 February 2026, 15:00	Spotland Stadium	A. Moore	4,248
Swinton Lions	6–82	Wakefield Trinity	8 February 2026, 15:00	Heywood Road	T. Jones	918

== Fourth round ==
The fourth round draw was made on 9 February 2026.

Number of teams per tier remaining in competition at start of round 4
Super League	Championship	Non-League	Total
13 / 13	3 / 20	0 / 34	16 / 67

Challenge Cup round 4 fixtures
Home	Score	Away	Match Information
Home	Score	Away	Date and Time	Venue	Referee	Attendance
Wakefield Trinity	24–14	Leeds Rhinos	13 March 2026, 20:00	Belle Vue	J. Smith	7,136
Wigan Warriors	30–6	Bradford Bulls	13 March 2026, 20:00	Brick Community Stadium	L. Rush	9,997
York Knights	56–10	Keighley Cougars	14 March 2026, 12:00	York Community Stadium	C. Kendall	2,008
Goole Vikings	10–78	Warrington Wolves	14 March 2026, 14:00	Halliwell Jones Stadium (Note: Goole ceded home advantage.)	T. Jones	3,195
Huddersfield Giants	12–52	Hull KR	14 March 2026, 15:00	Kirklees Stadium	M. Griffiths	2,736
Leigh Leopards	16–6	Hull F.C.	14 March 2026, 15:00	Leigh Sports Village	T. Grant	5,535
Catalans Dragons	58–0	Oldham	14 March 2026, 17:30 (Note: UK time, match kicks off at 18:30 CET)	Stade Gilbert Brutus	J. Vella	3,809
Castleford Tigers	8–32	St Helens	14 March 2026, 18:00	Wheldon Road	A. Moore	4,354

== Quarter-finals ==
The quarter-final draw was made on 17 March.

Number of teams per tier remaining in competition at the start of the quarter-finals
Super League	Championship	Non-League	Total
8 / 13	0 / 20	0 / 34	8 / 67

Challenge Cup quarter-final fixtures
Home	Score	Away	Match Information
Home	Score	Away	Date and Time	Venue	Referee	Attendance
St Helens	36–4	Catalans Dragons	10 April 2026, 20:00	BrewDog Stadium	A. Moore	6,785
Hull KR	48–10	York Knights	11 April 2026, 13:30	Craven Park	M. Griffiths
Warrington Wolves	24–10	Leigh Leopards	11 April 2026, 17:30	Halliwell Jones Stadium	J. Smith	7,759
Wakefield Trinity	22–26	Wigan Warriors	12 April 2026, 13:00	Belle Vue	L. Moore	8,051

== Semi-finals ==
The draw for the semi-finals took place on Sunday 12 April 2026, during half time between Wakefield Trinity and Wigan Warriors live on BBC One.

Number of teams per tier remaining in competition at the start of the semi-finals
Super League	Championship	Non-League	Total
4 / 13	0 / 20	0 / 34	4 / 67

Challenge Cup semi-final fixtures
Home	Score	Away	Match Information
Home	Score	Away	Date and Time	Venue	Referee	Attendance
St Helens	0–32	Wigan Warriors	9 May 2026, 14:30	Halliwell Jones Stadium	J. Smith	13,421
Warrington Wolves	12–32	Hull KR	10 May 2026, 16:00	Eco-Power Stadium	L. Moore	12,054

== Final ==
The final took place on Saturday 30 May 2026, as part of finals day, alongside the Women's final.

Number of teams per tier remaining in competition at start of final
Super League	Championship	League One	Non-League	Total
2 / 12	0 / 12	0 / 11	0 / 34	2 / 69

Challenge Cup Final
Home	Score	Away	Match Information
Home	Score	Away	Date and Time	Venue	Referee	Attendance
Wigan Warriors	40–10	Hull KR	30 May 2026, 15:00	Wembley Stadium	L. Moore	56,383

== Broadcast matches ==
Broadcast matches
Round	Match	Date	Broadcast method
1st	Thatto Heath Crusaders v Seaton Rangers	10 January	Broadcast live on BBC iPlayer.
1st	British Army vs Wests Warriors	10 January	Broadcast live on BFBS
1st	Siddal vs Waterhead Warriors	18 January	Streamed live on The Sportsman
2nd	Sheffield Eagles v Whitehaven	24 January	Broadcast live on BBC iPlayer.
2nd	Waterhead Warriors v Rochdale Hornets	25 January	Streamed live on The Sportsman
3rd	Workington Town v St Helens	6 February	Streamed live on The Sportsman
3rd	Widnes Vikings v Leeds Rhinos	7 February	Streamed live on The Sportsman
3rd	London Broncos v Bradford Bulls	8 February	Broadcast live on BBC iPlayer.
4th	Wakefield Trinity v Leeds Rhinos	13 March	Broadcast live on BBC iPlayer.
4th	Huddersfield Giants v Hull KR	14 March	Streamed live on The Sportsman
QF	St Helens v Catalans Dragons	10 April	Streamed live on SuperLeague+
QF	Hull KR vs York Knights	11 April	Broadcast live on BBC Two
QF	Warrington Wolves v Leigh Leopards	11 April	Streamed live on SuperLeague+
QF	Wakefield Trinity vs Wigan Warriors	12 April	Broadcast live on BBC One
SF	St Helens v Wigan Warriors	9 May	Broadcast live on BBC One
SF	Warrington Wolves vs Hull KR	10 May	Broadcast live on BBC Two
Final	Wigan Warriors vs Hull KR	30 May	Broadcast live on BBC One
