= 2022 Wigan Warriors season =

English rugby league season

Wigan Warriors 2022 season
- 2022 Challenge Cup champions
- Super League XXVII Rank: 2nd
- Play-off result: Semi-final
- Challenge Cup: Winners
- 2022 record: Wins: 23; draws: 0; losses: 9
- Points scored: For: 826; against: 503

Team information
- Chairman: Ian Lenagan
- Head Coach: Matt Peet
- Captain: Thomas Leuluai
- Stadium: DW Stadium
- Avg. attendance: 12,280
- Agg. attendance: 159,623
- High attendance: 19,210
- Low attendance: 9,581

Top scorers
- Tries: (Australia) Bevan French (31)
- Goals: (England) Harry Smith (90)
- Points: (England) Harry Smith (206)
Home colours	Away colours	Third colours
← 2021	List of seasons	2023 →

The 2022 season was the Wigan Warriors's 42nd consecutive season playing in England's top division of rugby league. During the season, they competed in the Super League XXVII and the 2022 Challenge Cup.

== Preseason friendlies ==
Date and time	Versus	H/A	Venue	Result	Score	Tries	Goals	Attendance	Report
23 January, 15:00	Newcastle Thunder	A	Kingston Park	W	42–12	Halsall (3), Mago, Miski, Shorrocks, Eckersley, Hanley	Smith (4/6), Eckersley (1/2)	927	
29 January, 17:30	Warrington Wolves	A	Halliwell Jones Stadium	W	14–6	Field (2), Thornley	Field (1/3)	7,657	

== Super League ==
=== Regular season ===
==== Matches ====
Win Loss

Date and time	MW	Versus	H/A	Venue	Result	Score	Tries	Goals	Attendance	TV	Report
11 February, 20:00	1	Hull KR	A	Craven Park	W	24–10	Bibby (2), Field, Marshall (2)	Field, Hardaker	9,044	Sky Sports	
18 February, 20:00	2	Leeds Rhinos	H	DW Stadium	W	34–12	Field (3), Powell (2), Farrell	Field (3), Hardaker (3)	12,575	Sky Sports	
24 February, 20:00	3	Huddersfield Giants	H	DW Stadium	W	22–12	Farrell (2), Bibby, Bateman	Hardaker (3)	10,291		
5 March, 18:00	4	Toulouse Olympique	A	Stade Ernest-Wallon	W	29–28	Field (2), Hardaker, Cust, Marshall	Hardaker (4); Drop-goals: Smith	5,466		
12 March, 18:00	5	Catalans Dragons	A	Stade Gilbert Brutus	L	0–28			7,481	Sky Sports	
17 March, 20:00	6	Castleford Tigers	H	DW Stadium	W	32–22	Hardaker, Farrell (2), Havard, Field	Hardaker (6)	10,042	Sky Sports	
31 March, 20:00	7	Hull F.C.	H	DW Stadium	W	19–18	Field (2), Havard	Hardaker (3); Drop-goals: Smith	9,581	Sky Sports	
15 April, 15:00	8	St Helens	A	Totally Wicked Stadium	L	4–22	Field		17,980	Sky Sports	
18 April, 15:00	9	Wakefield Trinity	H	DW Stadium	W	54–10	French (2), Singleton (2), Miski, Smith, Field (2), Cust	Smith (9)	11,621		
24 April, 13:00	10	Salford Red Devils	H	DW Stadium	W	30–24	Field (2), Ellis, Farrell, Smith	Smith (5)	10,783	Channel 4	
29 April, 20:00	11	Warrington Wolves	A	Halliwell Jones Stadium	W	40–24	Thornley (2), Field, Farrell, Marshall (2), Havard	Smith (6)	10,104	Sky Sports	
13 May, 19:45	12	Huddersfield Giants	A	Kirklees Stadium	L	22–32	Halsall (2), Nicholson (2)	Smith (3)	4,962	Sky Sports	
21 May, 15:00	13	Hull F.C.	A	MKM Stadium	L	22–31	Bateman, Marshall, French, Farrell	Smith (3)	11,396		
4 June, 14:00	14	Castleford Tigers	A	Wheldon Road	W	32–12	Marshall (2), French, Miski, Bibby, Farrell	Smith (4)	6,497	Channel 4	
10 June, 20:00	15	Salford Red Devils	A	AJ Bell Stadium	W	30–12	Smith, Marshall (2), French (3)	Smith (3)	5,944	Sky Sports	
24 June, 20:00	16	Toulouse Olympique	H	DW Stadium	W	40–6	Miski (4), Farrell, French, Field	Smith (6)	14,493		
3 July, 15:00	17	Wakefield Trinity	A	Belle Vue	W	46–22	Pearce-Paul (2), Marshall, Farrell, French (2), Miski (2)	Smith (7)	7,046		
9 July, 16:45	18	St Helens	N	St James' Park	L	18–20	French (2), Farrell	Smith (3)	36,821	Sky Sports	
15 July, 20:00	19	Hull F.C.	H	DW Stadium	W	60–0	French (7), Field (2), Marshall, Smith	Smith (8)	11,314		
21 July, 20:00	20	Leeds Rhinos	A	Headingley	L	12–42	French, Bibby	Smith (2)	13,368	Sky Sports	
28 July, 20:00	21	Hull KR	H	DW Stadium	W	46–4	French (3), Marshall (3), Cooper, Pearce-Paul, Mago	Smith (5)	11,032	Sky Sports	
5 August, 20:00	22	Warrington Wolves	H	DW Stadium	W	32–6	Halsall, Bibby, Marshall (3), Field	Smith (4)	13,261	Sky Sports	
14 August, 15:00	23	Wakefield Trinity	A	Belle Vue	L	12–30	Halsall, Field	Smith (2)	3,933		
19 August, 20:00	24	Toulouse Olympique	H	DW Stadium	W	52–6	French (3), Cust, Smith, Bibby, Pearce-Paul, Farrell	Smith (8)	12,145		
26 August, 20:00	25	St Helens	H	DW Stadium	W	30–10	French (2), Field, Farrell, Marshall	Smith (5)	19,210	Sky Sports	
29 August, 15:00	26	Hull KR	A	Craven Park	L	28–38	Partington, O’Keefe, Bibby, Halsall, McDonnell	O’Keefe (4)	7,315		
2 September, 20:00	27	Catalans Dragons	H	DW Stadium	W	48–4	Marshall (2), French (2), Smith, Ellis, Havard, Bibby	Smith (8)	13,275	Sky Sports	

==== Table ====
Pos	Team	Pld	W	D	L	PF	PA	PD	Pts	Qualification
1	St Helens (C, L)	27	21	0	6	674	374	+300	42	Advance to semi-finals
2	Wigan Warriors	27	19	0	8	818	483	+335	38	Advance to semi-finals
3	Huddersfield Giants	27	17	1	9	613	497	+116	35	Advance to elimination finals
4	Catalans Dragons	27	16	0	11	539	513	+26	32	Advance to elimination finals
5	Leeds Rhinos	27	14	1	12	577	528	+49	29	Advance to elimination finals
6	Salford Red Devils	27	14	0	13	700	602	+98	28	Advance to elimination finals
7	Castleford Tigers	27	13	0	14	544	620	−76	26	
8	Hull Kingston Rovers	27	12	0	15	498	608	−110	24	
9	Hull FC	27	11	0	16	508	675	−167	22	
10	Wakefield Trinity	27	10	0	17	497	648	−151	20	
11	Warrington Wolves	27	9	0	18	568	664	−96	18	
12	Toulouse Olympique (R)	27	5	0	22	421	745	−324	10	Relegated to the Championship

(C) Champions; (L) League Leaders' Shield winners; (R) Relegated

=== Play-offs ===
Date and time	Round	Versus	H/A	Venue	Result	Score	Tries	Goals	Red Cards	Yellow Cards	Attendance	TV	Report
16 September, 20:00	Semi-final	Leeds Rhinos	H	DW Stadium	L	8–20	Marshall, Powell	Smith (0/3)	Bateman (red card) 51'		12,777	Sky Sports	

== Challenge Cup ==
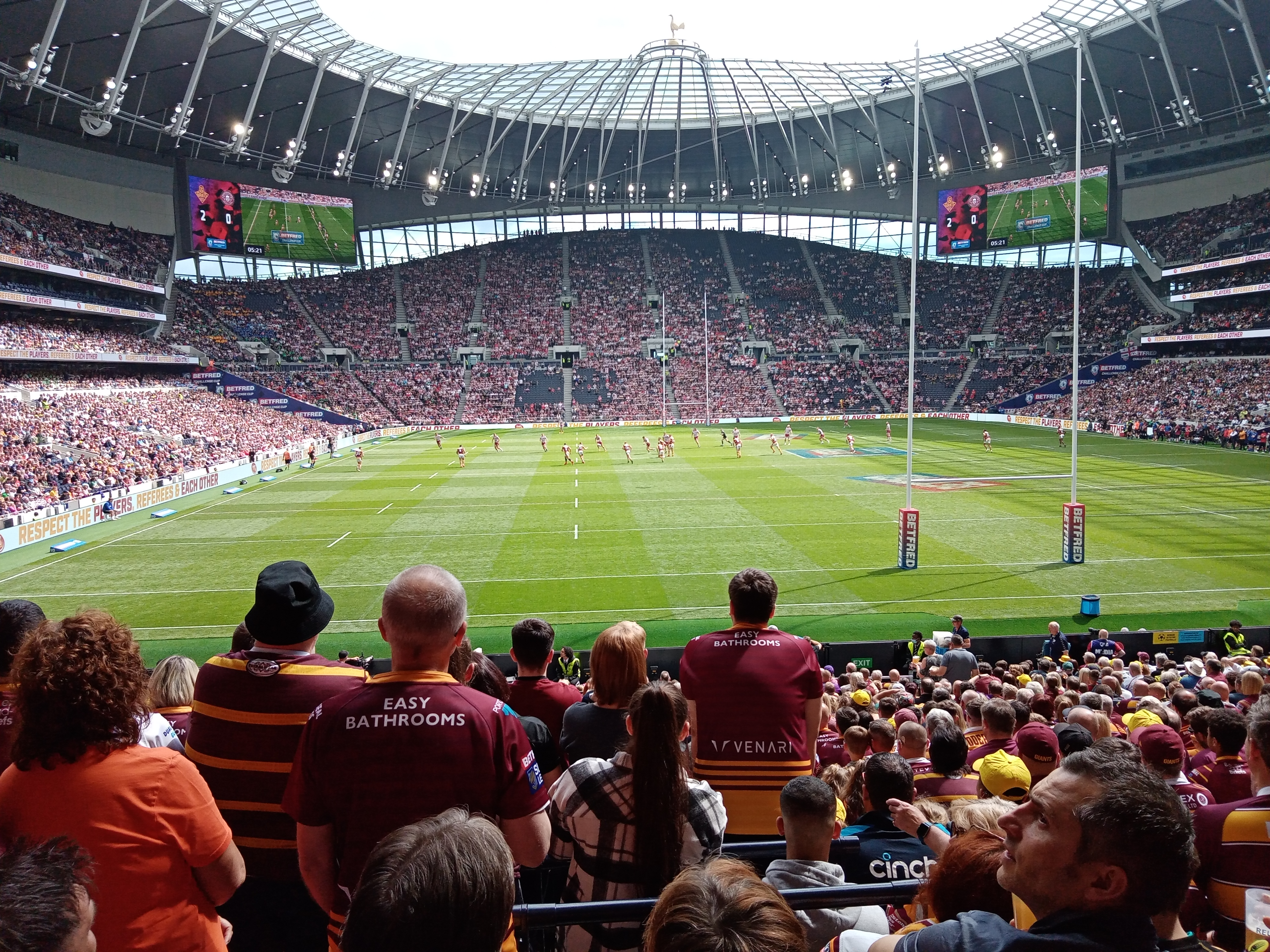
Looking towards the Wigan end at the Tottenham Hotspur Stadium during the 2022 Challenge Cup Final

Date and time	Round	Versus	H/A	Venue	Result	Score	Tries	Goals	Attendance	TV	Report
25 March, 19:35	Round 6	Salford Red Devils	H	DW Stadium	W	20–0	Byrne, Marshall, Bateman	Hardaker (4)	6,005	Premier Sports	
10 April, 14:30	Quarter-finals	Wakefield Trinity	A	Belle Vue	W	36–6	Field (3), Havard, Hardaker, Farrell	Hardaker (6)	3,756	BBC Two	
7 May, 14:30	Semi-finals	St Helens	N	Elland Road	W	20–18	Marshall (2), Cust, Farrell	Smith (2)	22,141	BBC One	
28 May, 15:00	Final	Huddersfield Giants	N	Tottenham Hotspur Stadium	W	16–14	Smith, Field, Marshall	Smith (2)	51,628	BBC One	

== Transfers ==
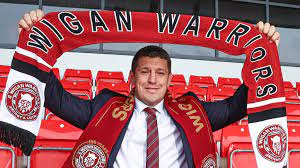
Matt Peet being confirmed as the new Wigan head coach ahead of the 2022 season

=== Gains ===
Player	Club	Contract	Date
(Australia) Kaide Ellis	St. George Illawarra Dragons	2 years	July 2021
(New Zealand) Patrick Mago	South Sydney Rabbitohs	2 years	July 2021
(Lebanon) Abbas Miski	London Broncos	2 years	July 2021
(Australia) Cade Cust	Manly Warringah Sea Eagles	2 Years	November 2021
(England) Iain Thornley	Leigh Centurions		November 2021
(Brazil) Ramon Silva			November 2021
(England) Mike Cooper	Warrington Wolves	1 year	July 2022 (Note: Cooper was originally scheduled to join Wigan in 2023 but was released by Warrington in July, and therefore able to join Wigan for the remainder of the 2022 season.)

=== Losses ===
Player	Club	Contract	Date
(England) Jackson Hastings	Wests Tigers	2 Years	April 2021
(England) Oliver Gildart	Wests Tigers	2 Years	May 2021
(England) Dominic Manfredi	Retired	—N/a	August 2021
(England) Amir Bourouh	Salford Red Devils	2 Years	August 2021
(England) Tony Clubb	Retired	—N/a	September 2021
(England) Joe Bullock	Warrington Wolves	3 Years	October 2021
(England) Zak Hardaker	Released	—N/a	April 2022

== Squad ==
2022 Wigan Warriors Squad
First team squad			Coaching staff
(Australia) 1 Bevan French – FB; (England) 2 Jake Bibby – CE, WG; (England) 3 Zak Hardaker – CE, FB (GK); (England) 4 Iain Thornley – CE; (England) 5 Liam Marshall – WG; (Australia) 6 Cade Cust – HK, SH, SO; (New Zealand) 7 Thomas Leuluai – SO, HK, SH; (Ireland) 8 Brad Singleton – PR; (England) 9 Sam Powell – HK; (New Zealand) 10 Patrick Mago – PR; (Samoa) 11 Willie Isa – SR, CE; (England) 12 Liam Farrell – SR; (England) 13 John Bateman – LF, SR	(England) 14 Morgan Smithies – LF; (Australia) 15 Kaide Ellis – LF, PR; (England) 16 Harry Smith – SO, SH (GK); (England) 17 Oliver Partington – PR, LF; (England) 19 Ethan Havard – PR, LF; (Ireland) 20 Liam Byrne – PR; (England) 21 Kai Pearce-Paul – SR; (England) 22 Joe Shorrocks – LF; (Australia) 23 Jai Field – SO, SH; (Lebanon) 24 Abbas Miski – WG; (England) 25 Sam Halsall – CE, WG; (Ireland) 26 James McDonnell – SR, CE	(England) 27 Umyla Hanley – FB; (England) 28 Brad O'Neill – HK; (England) 29 Alex Sutton – CE; (England) 30 Matty Nicholson – LF; (Brazil) 31 Ramon Silva – PR; (England) 32 Junior Nsemba; (England) 33 Zach Eckersley; (England) 34 Logan Astey; (England) 35 Jack Bibby; (England) 36 Mike Cooper – LF, PR; (England) 37 Harvie Hill; (England) 38 Ben O'Keefe (GK); (England) 39 Tom Forber	Head coach: (England) Matt Peet; Assistant coaches: (Wales) Lee Briers; (England) Sean O’Loughlin; Legend: (c) Captain(s); (vc) Vice-captain(s); Injured; GK = Goal Kicker
