= 2021 Wigan Warriors season =

English rugby league season

Wigan Warriors 2021 season
- Super League XXVI Rank: 4th
- Play-off result: Lost in Elimination Playoffs
- Challenge Cup: Quarter-finals
- 2021 record: Wins: 16; draws: 0; losses: 11

Team information
- Chairman: Ian Lenagan
- Head Coach: Adrian Lam
- Captain: Thomas Leuluai
- Stadium: DW Stadium
- High attendance: 16,390 (Note: Home attendances only)
- Low attendance: 5,555 (Note: Home attendances only; does not include limited capacity or behind closed doors games due to the COVID-19 pandemic)
Home colours	Away colours
← 2020	List of seasons	2022 →

The 2021 season will be Wigan Warriors's 41st consecutive season playing in England's top division of rugby league. During the season, they will compete in the Super League XXVI and the 2021 Challenge Cup.

== Preseason friendlies ==
On 4 March, Wigan announced a pre-season friendly against Salford Red Devils ahead of the delay start to the Super League.

Date and time	Versus	H/A	Venue	Result	Score	Tries	Goals	Attendance	Report
14 March, 16:00	Salford Red Devils	A	AJ Bell Stadium	L	6–20	Sam Powell	Zak Hardaker	Played behind closed doors due to the COVID-19 pandemic.	

== Super League ==
=== Regular season ===
The start of the 2021 Super League season, which ordinarily would have started in late January, was delayed to March due to the continuation of the COVID-19 pandemic. On 11 February it was confirmed that match week one would commence on Friday 26 March, with Wigan Warriors facing newly promoted local rivals Leigh Centurions in the second fixture of the round. The full fixture list was announced on 26 February.

==== Matches ====
Win Draw Loss Postponed

Date and time	MW	Versus	H/A	Venue	Result	Score	Tries	Goals	Attendance	TV	Report
26 March, 20:15	1	Leigh Centurions	N	Headingley Rugby Stadium	W	20–18	Bibby (2), Hardaker, Bullock	Hardaker (2)	Played behind closed doors due to the COVID-19 pandemic.	Sky Sports	
1 April, 18:00	2	Wakefield Trinity	N	Totally Wicked Stadium	W	34–6	Partington, Bibby (3), Hardaker, Bateman	Hardaker (5)	Played behind closed doors due to the COVID-19 pandemic.	Sky Sports	
15 April, 19:45	3	Leeds Rhinos	A	Headingley Rugby Stadium	W	19–6	Farrell (2), Hardaker, Hastings	Hardaker; Drop-goals: Hardaker	Played behind closed doors due to the COVID-19 pandemic.	Sky Sports	
22 April, 18:00	4	Castleford Tigers	H	DW Stadium	W	22–12	Hardaker, French (2), Powell	Hardaker (3)	Played behind closed doors due to the COVID-19 pandemic.	Our League	
29 April, 19:45	5	Hull F.C.	H	DW Stadium	W	16–14	Hastings, Farrell, Bibby	Hardaker (2)	Played behind closed doors due to the COVID-19 pandemic.	Sky Sports	
17 May, 19:45	6	Leigh Centurions	A	Leigh Sports Village	W	30–16	Smith, Manfredi, French, Farrell, Bibby (2)	Smith (3)	~4,000 (Note: Limited to one quarter capacity or 4,000 due to the COVID-19 pandemic in the United Kingdom)	Our League	
22 May, 13:00	7	Salford Red Devils	A	AJ Bell Stadium	W	17–16	Singleton (2), Farrell	Smith (2); Drop-goals: Hastings	~4,000		
29 May, 17:00	8	Catalans Dragons	A	Stade Gilbert Brutus	L	0–48			1,000 (Note: Capacity capped at 1,000 due to differences in COVID-19 regulation in France)	Sky Sports	
11 June, 19:45	9	Huddersfield Giants	A	Kirklees Stadium	Postponed due to positive COVID-19 cases within the Huddersfield squad.						
18 June, 19:45	10	Hull KR	H	DW Stadium	L	8–18	Gildart (2)		~4,000		
24 June, 19:45	11	Wakefield Trinity	A	Belle Vue	L	6–14	Hanley	Smith	~4,000		
30 June, 19:45	12	Warrington Wolves	H	DW Stadium	L	14–40	Powell, Isa, Gildart	Smith	~4,000	Sky Sports	
4 July, 19:30	13	St Helens	A	Totally Wicked Stadium	L	6–24	Farrell	Smith	~4,000	Sky Sports	
11 July, 15:00	14	Huddersfield Giants	H	DW Stadium	W	16–12	Marshall, Clark, Smith	Smith (2)	~4,000		
16 July, 19:45	9	Huddersfield Giants	A	Kirklees Stadium	W	14–12	Clark, Farrell	Smith (3)	~4,000		
23 July, 19:45	15	Wakefield Trinity	H	DW Stadium	W	25–12	Bibby (3), Shorrocks, Marshall	Smith (2); Drop-goals: Hastings	5,555		
28 July, 19:45	16	Warrington Wolves	A	Halliwell Jones Stadium	L	8–21	Marshall (2)		8,014	Sky Sports	
1 August, 15:00	17	Leigh Centurions	H	DW Stadium	W	50–6	Leuluai, Hanley (3), Farrell (2), Halsall, Shorrocks, Hastings	Smith (7)	9,206		
6 August, 19:45	18	Salford Red Devils	H	DW Stadium	W	16–6	Halsall, Powell	Smith (4)	9,431		
13 August, 19:45	19	Hull KR	A	Hull College Craven Park	L	14–26	Marshall, Bibby (2)	Smith	6,230	Sky Sports	
20 August, 19:45	20	St Helens	H	DW Stadium	L	2–26		Smith	16,390	Sky Sports	
25 August, 19:45	21	Leeds Rhinos	H	DW Stadium	L	0–14			11,390	Sky Sports	
30 August, 17:00	22	Castleford Tigers	A	The Jungle	W	22–0	Hastings, Marshall, Gildart, Singleton	Smith (3)		Sky Sports	
5 September, 15:15	23	Warrington Wolves	N	St James' Park	L	6–10	Havard	Smith	25,762	Sky Sports	
10 September, 15:00	24	Hull F.C.	A	KCOM Stadium	W	10–0	Bibby, Hardaker	Hardaker			
17 September, 19:45	25	Catalans Dragons	H	DW Stadium	W	12–8	Isa, McDonnell	Hardaker (2)	12,852		

==== League table ====
Pos	Team	Pld	W	D	L	PF	PA	PP	Pts	PCT	Qualification (Note: Teams must have played at least 70% of scheduled fixtures to qualify for the play-offs.)
1	Catalans Dragons (L)	23	19	0	4	688	398	172.9	38	82.61	Semi-final
2	St. Helens (C)	21	16	0	5	548	229	239.3	32	76.19	Semi-final
3	Warrington Wolves	21	15	1	5	588	354	166.1	31	73.81	Elimination Semi-finals
4	Wigan Warriors	25	15	0	10	387	385	100.5	30	60.00	Elimination Semi-finals
5	Leeds Rhinos	24	13	0	11	556	440	126.4	26	54.17	Elimination Semi-finals
6	Hull Kingston Rovers	20	10	0	10	497	458	108.5	20	50.00	Elimination Semi-finals
7	Castleford Tigers	23	11	0	12	437	552	79.2	22	47.83	
8	Hull FC	21	8	1	12	409	476	85.9	17	40.48	
9	Huddersfield Giants	24	9	0	15	460	516	89.1	18	37.50	
10	Wakefield Trinity	24	9	0	15	482	548	88.0	18	37.50	
11	Salford Red Devils	22	7	0	15	402	584	68.8	14	31.82	
12	Leigh Centurions (R)	22	2	0	20	356	870	40.9	4	9.09	Relegated to the Championship

Rules for classification: 1) win percentage; 2) points scored percentage (points scored divided by points conceded).
(C) Champions; (L) League Leaders' Shield Winners; (R) Relegated

=== Play-offs ===
Date and time	Round	Versus	H/A	Venue	Result	Score	Tries	Goals	Attendance	TV	Report
23 September, 19:45	Elimination Play-off	Leeds Rhinos	H	DW Stadium	L	0–8			7,396	Sky Sports	

== Challenge Cup ==
Date and time	Round	Versus	H/A/N	Venue	Result	Score	Tries	Goals	Attendance	TV	Report
9 April, 19:45	Round 3 (Note: Equivalent of the tournament's usual Round 6. The structure of the competition was temporarily altered for 2021 due to the COVID-19 pandemic.)	York City Knights	A	York Community Stadium	W	26–0	Hardaker, Smith, Halsall, Hanley, Clubb	Hardaker (3)	Played behind closed doors due to the COVID-19 pandemic.	The Sportsman	
8 May, 14:30	Quarter Finals	Hull F.C.	N	Headingley Rugby Stadium	L	10–20	Bibby, Manfredi	Smith	Played behind closed doors due to the COVID-19 pandemic.	BBC Two	

== Transfers ==
=== Gains ===
Player	Club	Contract	Date
(England) John Bateman	Canberra Raiders	4 Years	July 2020
(Australia) Jai Field	Parramatta Eels	2 Years	November 2020

=== Losses ===
Player	Club	Contract	Date
(England) Sean O'Loughlin	Retired		November 2020
(England) Craig Mullen	Leigh Centurions	1 Year	November 2020
(Wales) Ben Flower	Leigh Centurions		December 2020
(England) Joe Burgess	Salford Red Devils	3 years	December 2020
(England) Jack Wells	Salford Red Devils		December 2020
(England) Jake Shorrocks	Newcastle Thunder		December 2020
(England) Nathan Wilde	Newcastle Thunder		December 2020
(England) Max Roberts	Oldham Roughyeds		December 2020
(England) James Barran	Oldham Roughyeds		December 2020
(England) Joe Greenwood	Huddersfield Giants	2 years	December 2020
(England) Chris Hankinson	London Broncos	1 Year Loan	December 2020
(England) George Burgess	Released		February 2021

== Squad ==
2021 Wigan Warriors Squad
First team squad			Coaching staff
(Australia) 1 Bevan French – FB; (England) 2 Dominic Manfredi – WG; (England) 3 Zak Hardaker – CE, FB (GK); (England) 4 Oliver Gildart – CE; (England) 5 Liam Marshall – WG; (Australia) 6 Jai Field – SO, SH; (New Zealand) 7 Thomas Leuluai (c) – SO, HK, SH; (Ireland) 8 Brad Singleton – PR; (England) 9 Sam Powell – HK; (England) 10 Joe Bullock – PR; (Samoa) 11 Willie Isa – SR, CE; (England) 12 Liam Farrell – SR; (England) 13 John Bateman – LF, SR	(England) 14 Oliver Partington – PR, LF; (England) 15 Morgan Smithies – LF; (England) 17 Tony Clubb – PR; 18 Warriors Fans; (Ireland) 19 Liam Byrne – PR; (England) 20 Harry Smith – SO, SH (GK); (Bulgaria) 21 Ethan Havard – PR, LF; (England) 22 Jake Bibby – CE, WG; (Māori people) 23 Mitch Clark – PR; (England) 24 Chris Hankinson – CE (GK); (England) 25 Joe Shorrocks – LF	(England) 27 Kai Pearce-Paul – SR; (England) 28 Sam Halsall – CE, WG; (England) 29 James McDonnell – SR, CE; (England) 30 Umyla Hanley – FB; (England) 31 Jackson Hastings – SH, SO; (England) 32 Ben Kilner – PR; (England) 33 Amir Bourouh – HK	Head coach: Adrian Lam; Assistant coaches: John Winder; Matty Peet; Darrell Goulding; Legend: (c) Captain(s); (vc) Vice-captain(s); Injured; GK = Goal Kicker; Updated: 7 December 2020; Source(s): 2021 Squad Numbers
