= Rugby League Writers and Broadcasters' Association =

English news media association

The Rugby League Writers and Broadcasters' Association (RLWBA) is an association of members of the English news media who write about rugby league in newspapers or present for television and radio programmes. Founded as the Rugby League Writers' Association, it presents a Player of the Year award annually to the best performing player in English rugby league.

Members of the Association who are present at the Challenge Cup Final decide which player should be awarded the Lance Todd Trophy for being man of the match.

== RLWBA Player of the Year ==
Since 1996, the association has voted on the Player of the Year in recognition of the best performing Super League player that season. The winner of the award receives the Raymond Fletcher Trophy.

=== Winners ===
Year	Winner	Club	Notes
1996	Apollo Perelini	St Helens	
1997	Andy Farrell	Wigan Warriors	
1998	Iestyn Harris	Leeds Rhinos	
1999	Iestyn Harris	Leeds Rhinos	
2000	Tommy Martyn	St Helens	
2001	Paul Sculthorpe	St Helens	
2002	Adrian Lam	Wigan Warriors	
2003	Jamie Peacock	Bradford Bulls	
2004	Danny McGuire	Leeds Rhinos	
2005	Jamie Lyon	St Helens	
2006	Paul Wellens	St Helens	
2007	Trent Barrett	Wigan Warriors	
2008	James Graham	St Helens	
2009	Brett Hodgson	Huddersfield Giants	
2010	Pat Richards	Wigan Warriors	
2011	Sam Tomkins	Wigan Warriors	
2012	Sam Tomkins	Wigan Warriors	
2013	Danny Brough	Huddersfield Giants	
2014	Jamie Peacock	Leeds Rhinos	
2015	Adam Cuthbertson	Leeds Rhinos	
2016	Gareth Ellis; Danny Houghton	Both Hull F.C.	
2017	Luke Gale	Castleford Tigers	
2018	James Roby	St Helens	
2019	Jackson Hastings	Salford Red Devils	
2020	Bevan French	Wigan Warriors	
2021	Sam Tomkins	Catalans Dragons	
2022	Jai Field	Wigan Warriors	
2023	Lachlan Lam	Leigh Leopards	
2024	Mikey Lewis	Hull KR	
2025	Lachlan Lam	Leigh Leopards	
2026	Brad O'Neill	Wigan Warriors	

== Merit Award ==
The Rugby League Writers' Merit Award is awarded annually to a player, coach or official for their services to the game of rugby league. The inaugural winner of the award was Geoff Fletcher in 1982. The award winner is presented with the Arthur Brooks Trophy, named after a former rugby league journalist for the Daily Mirror.

=== Winners ===
Year	Winner	Role
1982	Geoff Fletcher	Player and official
1983	David Howes	RFL Press Officer
1984	Tom Morton	Club secretary
1985	John Holmes	Player
1986	Roger Millward	Player and coach
1987	Tom Bergin	RL Writers' Association life member
1988	Trevor Foster	Player and official
1989	Gary Hetherington	Player and official
1990	Maurice Oldroyd	BARLA administrator
1991	John Joyner	Player
1992	David Oxley	RFL chief executive
1993	Jeff Grayshon	Player
1994	Mal Meninga	Player and coach
1995	Alex Murphy	Player and coach
1996	Garry Schofield	Player
1997	Lee Crooks	Player
1998	Eric Ashton	Player, coach and official
1999	Shaun Edwards	Player
2000	Daryl Powell	Player and coach
2001	Johnny Whiteley	Player and coach
2002	Peter Fox	Player and coach
2003	Ray French	Commentator
2004	Harry Jepson	Administrator
2005	Colin Hutton	Player, coach and official
2006	David Hinchliffe	Member of Parliament
2007	John Wilkinson	Chairman
2008	Tommy Sale	Player and official
2009	Steve Prescott	Player
2010	Malcolm Alker	Player
2011	Not awarded	
2012	Mark Aston	Player and official
2013	Dave Hadfield	Rugby league correspondent
2014	Mike Nicholas	Player, coach and official
2015	Kevin Sinfield; Jamie Peacock	Players
2016	Richard Bott	Rugby league correspondent
2021	Bernard Guasch	Chairman
2022	Jodie Cunningham	Player
2023	Dave Woods	Commentator
