= 2022 Challenge Cup final =

Rugby league match in the United Kingdom

2022 Challenge Cup Final
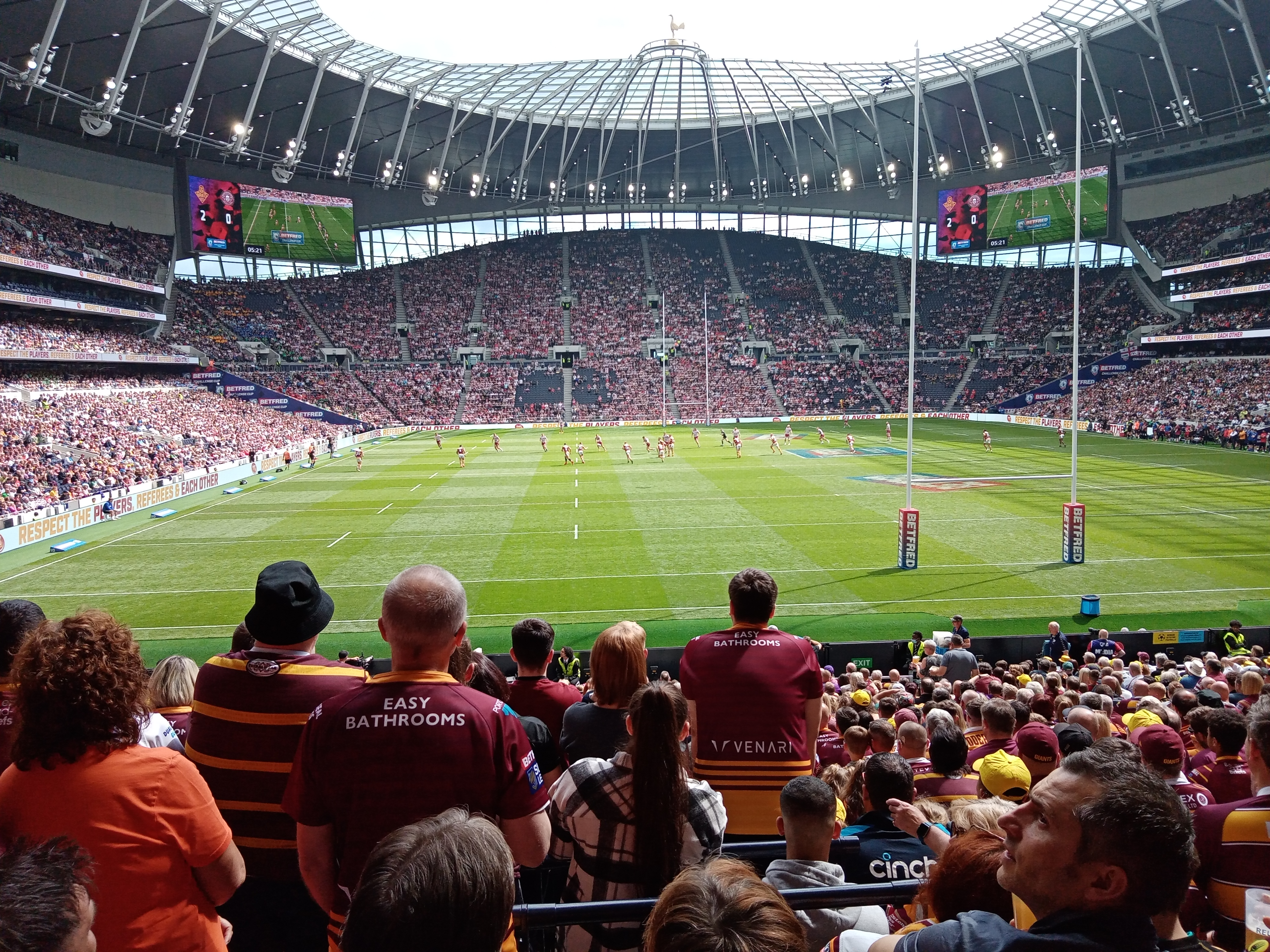
Huddersfield Giants	Wigan Warriors
14	16
	1	2	Total
HUD	10	4	14
WIG	6	10	16
- Date: 28 May 2022
- Stadium: Tottenham Hotspur Stadium
- Location: London, United Kingdom
- Lance Todd Trophy: Chris McQueen
- God Save The Queen and Abide with Me: Lizzy Jones; Twinnie
- Referee: James Child
- Attendance: 51,628

Broadcast partners
- Broadcasters: BBC One

The 2022 Challenge Cup Final was the 121st final of the Rugby Football League's Challenge Cup knock-out competition, which was contested between the Huddersfield Giants and the Wigan Warriors. It took place on 28 May 2022 at the Tottenham Hotspur Stadium. Wigan won the cup for the 20th time by beating Huddersfield 16–14.

== Background ==
=== Teams ===
Wigan Warriors and Huddersfield Giants have faced each other only once before in the Challenge Cup Final during the 1919–20 season resulting in a 21–10 victory to Huddersfield. Since then, Wigan have established themselves as the most successful team in the tournament, winning the trophy 19 times and reaching a further 13 finals, their last in 2017, and last winning in 2013. By contrast, Huddersfield's ten Challenge Cup Final appearances consist of six wins and four losses, their most recent in 2009, but have not won the competition since 1953. Upon making the final, Wigan were fourth in the Super League, behind rivals, cup holders, and their semi-final opposition St Helens and Catalans Dragons Meanwhile Huddersfield were fifth, only 1 point behind, the sides had met twice in the league with each side winning their home games, with little between the sides it made the final one of the hardest to call in recent years.

=== Stadium ===
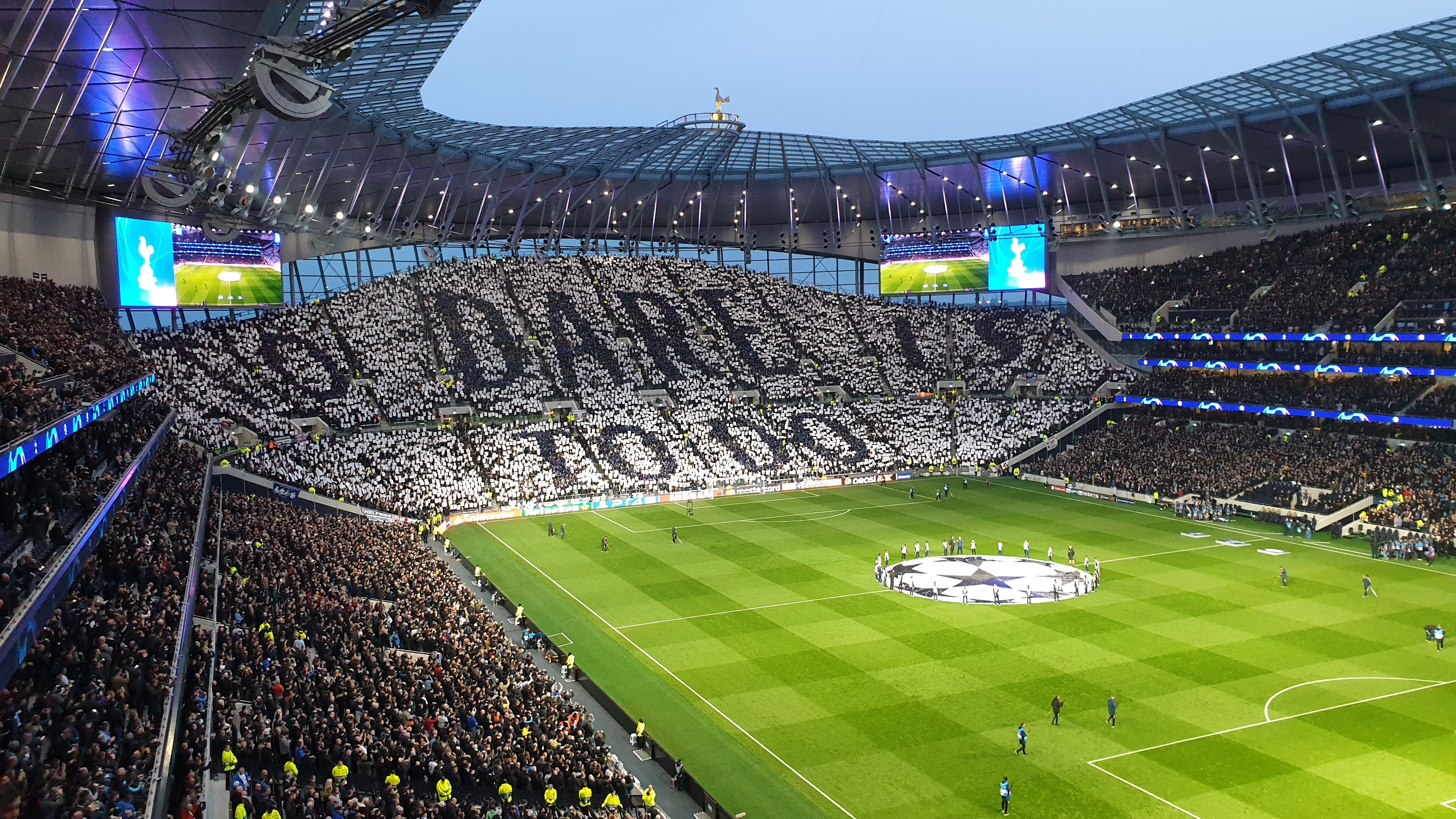
The Tottenham Hotspur Stadium hosted the final for one year only

The 2022 Challenge Cup Final was moved away from Wembley to the Tottenham Hotspur Stadium due to a scheduling conflict between the RFL and the BBC. This also resulted in the final being moved to late May from its usual date in July or August. The RFL later announced this would be a temporary change, and would return to Wembley for 2023.

== Route to the final ==
=== Huddersfield Giants ===
Round	Opposition	Venue	Score
Sixth round	Barrow Raiders	Craven Park	30–16
Quarter-final	Hull F.C.	Kirklees Stadium	24–16
Semi-final	Hull KR	Elland Road	25–4

=== Wigan Warriors ===
Round	Opposition	Venue	Score
Sixth round	Salford Red Devils	DW Stadium	20–0
Quarter-final	Wakefield Trinity	Belle Vue	36–6
Semi-final	St Helens	Elland Road	20–18

== Pre-match ==
=== 1895 Cup Final ===
In the curtain opener, Leigh Centurions beat Featherstone Rovers 30–16 in the 2022 1895 Cup Final.

=== Anthems ===
Regular Challenge Cup anthem singer Lizze Jones sung Abide with Me ahead of the final. The national anthem was sung by Twinnie from the roof of the Tottenham Hotspur Stadium.

=== Ticketing ===
Ticket prices started at £30 for adults and £15 for under-16s, with a select number of free tickets for NHS and military personnel.

== Match details ==
Saturday, 28 May
15:00 (BST)

Huddersfield Giants	14–16	Wigan Warriors
Tries: Leutele (17'); McQueen (33'); McGillvary (58'); Goals: Lolohea (2' pen.) 1/5	report	Tries: Smith (25′); Field (42′); Marshall (77′); Goals: Smith (26', 43') 2/3

Tottenham Hotspur Stadium, London
Attendance: 51,628
Referee: (England) James Child
Lance Todd Trophy: Chris McQueen

=== Teams ===
Huddersfield: Lolohea, McGillvary, Cudjoe, Leutele, Senior, Cogger, Russell, Hill, Levi, Wilson, Jones, McQueen, Yates (c)
Interchanges: English, Greenwood, Golding, Trout.
Head coach: Ian Watson

Wigan: Field, French, Thornley, Bibby, Marshall, Cust, Smith, Singleton, O'Neill, Byrne, Farrell (c), Bateman, Smithies.
Interchanges: Leuluai, Mago, Ellis, Havard.
Head coach: Matty Peet

=== Summary ===
The game was viewed by many as a classic, with Wigan breaking Huddersfield hearts, with a match winning try late on. Huddersfield had led the game for the most part, taking a 2–0 lead through a Tui Lolohea penalty goal. Ricky Leutele scored the games first try, to give Huddersfield a 6–0 lead, Lolohea hit the post with the conversion. Wigan then scored through Harry Smith to which he converted, to level the scores at 6–6. With 20 minutes of the game played, Huddersfield lost prop forward Chris Hill, with a leg injury. With the scores level at 6–6, Chris McQueen threw a dummy and went over to give Huddersfield a 10–6 lead. Lolohea missed the conversion (0/2). Half time- Huddersfield 10–6 Wigan.

Wigan came out strong for the second half, and were soon in the ascendancy, as Jai Field went over in the opening minutes of the 2nd half. Smith successfully converted the try, to put Wigan into the lead for the first time in the game. Huddersfield hit back soon after, with Jermaine McGillvary touching down in the far corner, despite 4 Wigan defenders trying to keep him out. There was a bit of controversy halfway through the 2nd half, when Morgan Smithies was penalised of 2 reckless high tackles, within the space of a couple of minutes. many in the crowd were expecting to see the cup final's first yellow card since 2001, but referee James Child was extremely lenient in issuing Smithies with just a ticking off. Lolohea opted to go for the 2 points to try and give the giants A 4 point lead, but missed the relative straight forward penalty. however, with the clock ticking down and Huddersfield defending stoutly, Cade Cust went off with what appeared to be a dislocated elbow, and was replaced by Thomas Leuluai. With less than 4 minutes of the game remaining, Wigan were pushing and pushing to find their match winning try, and after a switch of play from right to left by Thomas Leuluai, Smith put an inch perfect kick behind the Giants defence for Liam Marshall to score the match winning try, to the delight of the Wigan fans, and the despair of the Huddersfield fans. Smith missed the conversion, and with less than 2 minutes remaining, Huddersfield could not gain possession of the ball, and the match was won by Wigan.

== Post-match ==
The day following the final, Wigan Warriors had a trophy parade outside the Robin Park Area.

Following, what was dubbed by the media, a successful final for rugby league certain outlets questioned the finals future at Wembley especially if the trend of declining attendance figures in the sport continued. Wembley and the RFL are in a current agreement to hold the final at the stadium until 2027.

The match was watched by 1,519,400 people on BBC One.
