= Jai Field =

Australian professional rugby league footballer

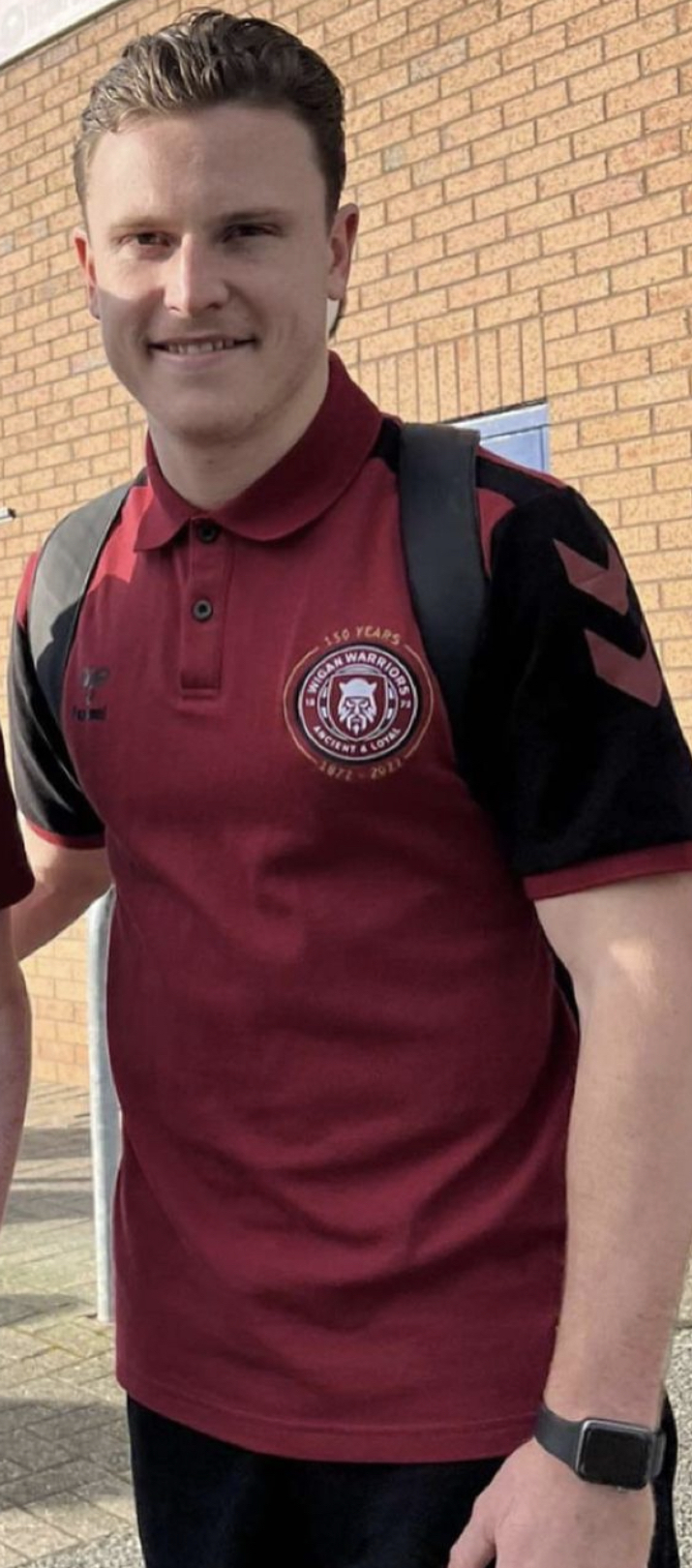

Personal information
- Full name: Jai Field
- Born: 6 September 1997 (age 29) Forbes, New South Wales, Australia
- Height: 5 ft 11 in (1.81 m)
- Weight: 13 st 5 lb (85 kg)

Playing information
- Position: Fullback, Stand-off
Club
Years	Team	Pld	T	G	FG	P
2017–19	St. George Illawarra Dragons	11	1	7	0	18
2020	Parramatta Eels	6	3	0	0	12
2021–	Wigan Warriors	138	98	3	0	398
	Total	155	102	10	0	428
- Source: As of 17 July 2022

Jai Field (born 6 September 1997) is an Australian professional rugby league footballer who plays as a fullback or stand-off for the Wigan Warriors in the Super League.

He previously played for the St. George Illawarra Dragons and the Parramatta Eels in the NRL.

== Background ==
Field was born in Forbes, New South Wales, Australia, and is of Irish and Indigenous Australian (Wiradjuri) descent.

He played junior rugby league for the Shellharbour Sharks, before being signed by the St. George Illawarra Dragons.

== Playing career ==
=== St. George Illawarra Dragons ===
==== 2016 ====
In 2016, Field played for the St. George Illawarra Dragons' NYC team. In December, he re-signed with the St. George club on a three-year contract until the end of 2019.

==== 2017 ====
In round 1 of the 2017 NRL season, Field made his NRL debut for St. George against the Penrith Panthers. He saw his next two games in round 10 and 11, after injuries to the Dragons' top squad.

==== 2018 ====
Field played two first grade games for the 2018 season, both of them coming off the bench.

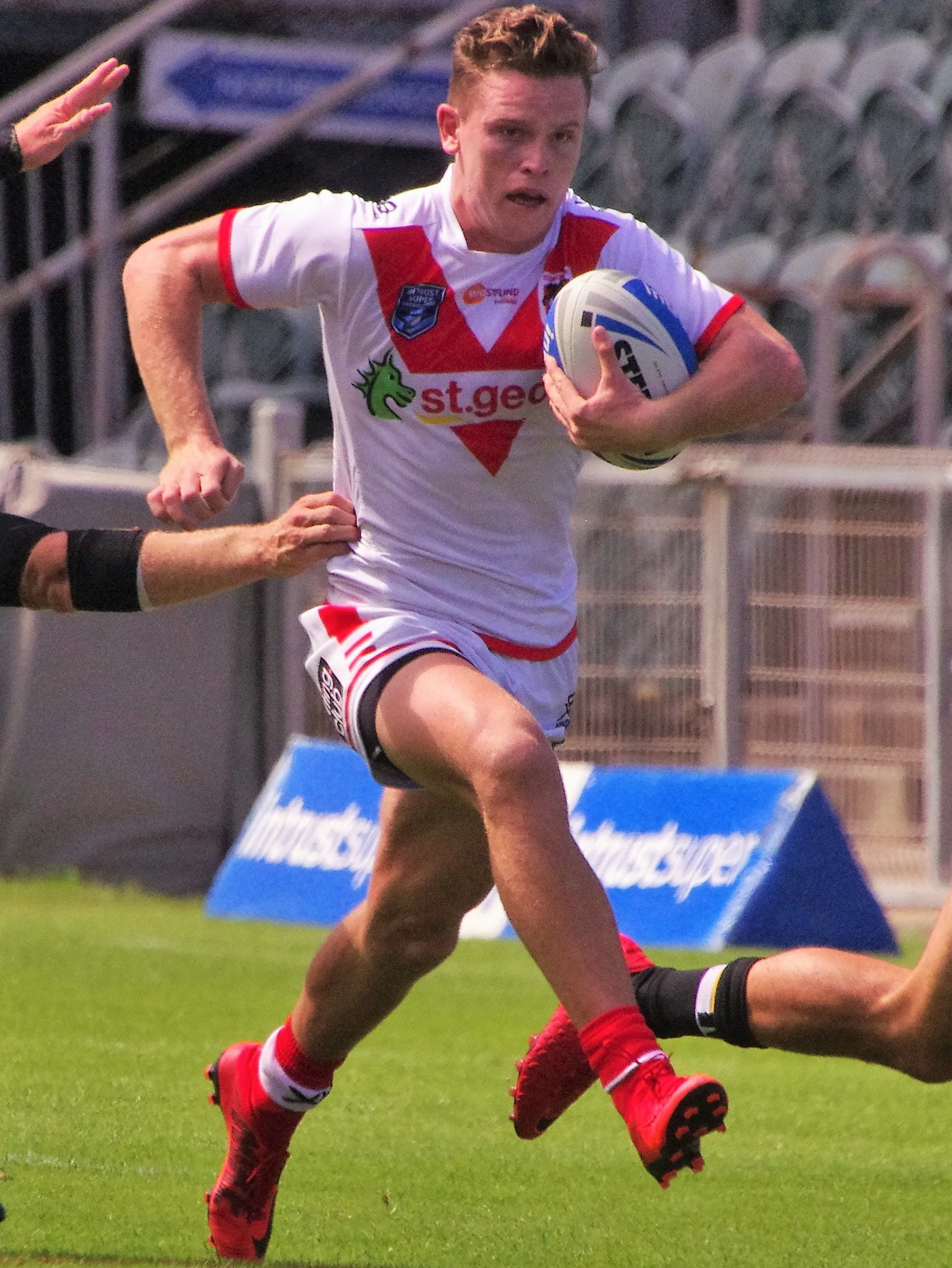
Field playing for St. George Illawarra Dragons in 2018

==== 2019 ====
Field made a total of 6 appearances for St George in the 2019 NRL season as the club finished second last on the table.

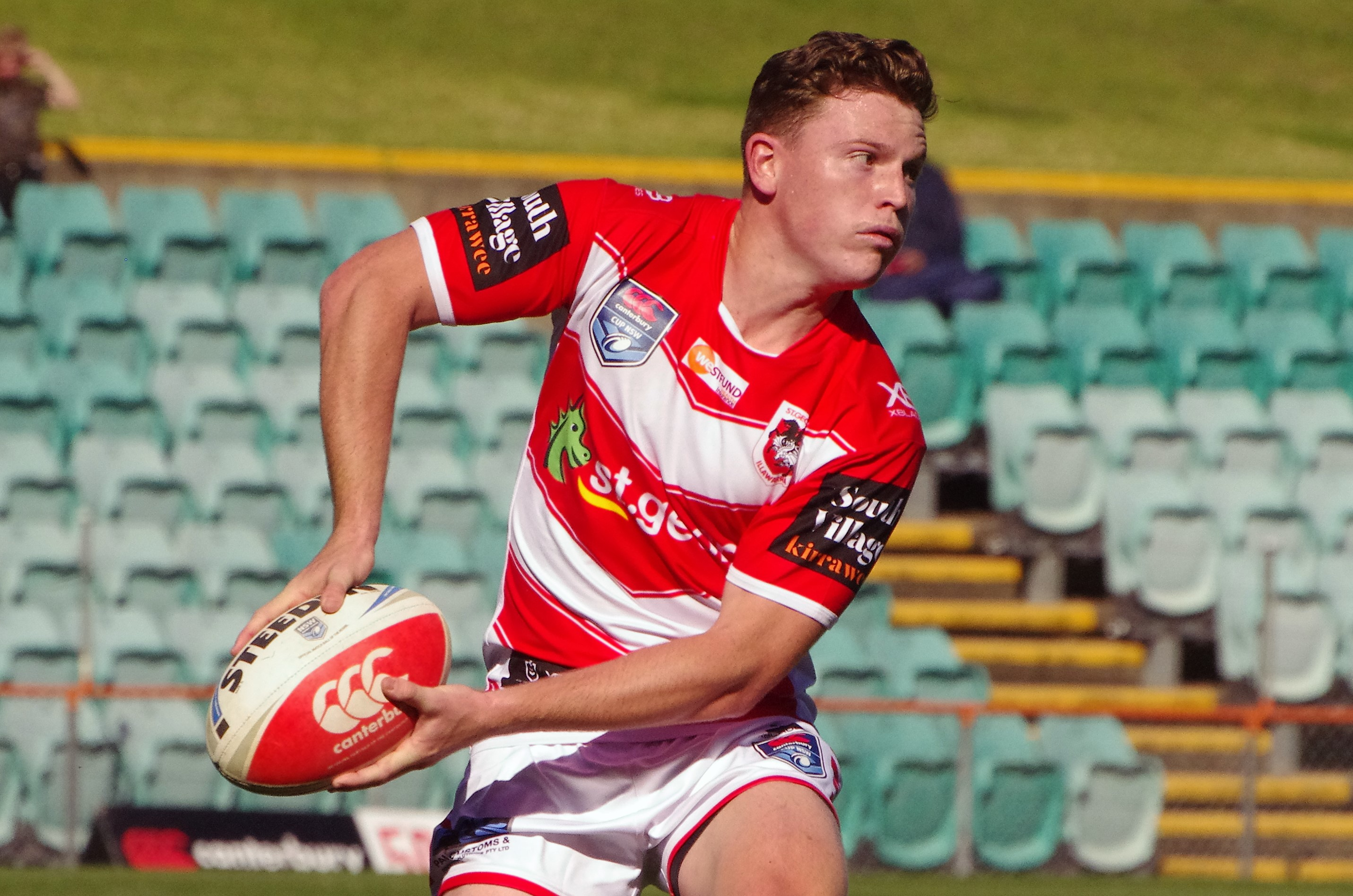
Field playing for St. George Illawarra Dragons in 2019

In November 2019, it was announced that Field had been released by the club.

=== Parramatta Eels ===
==== 2020 ====
On 20 February, Field signed a train-and-trial contract with Parramatta after his move to English side Leeds broke down. Field played in the club's 28-24 trial game loss against South Sydney.

On 24 May, Field signed a contract to join the Parramatta development squad for the rest of the 2020 NRL season. In round 8, Field made his debut for Parramatta and scored a try as Parramatta defeated North Queensland 42–4 at Bankwest Stadium. On 12 October, Field was released by the Parramatta club along with ten other players. Field was announced as a Wigan Warriors player for 2021 on 9 November 2020.

=== Wigan Warriors ===
==== 2021 ====
Field made his debut for Wigan in the opening match of the 2021 season against Leigh Centurions playing winger. Field suffered a torn hamstring in the 19th minute of the game attempting a sprint ruling him out for five months. Field returned to the pitch, coming on at half time, in Wigan's August victory over Salford, however he suffered a groin injury in his next match for the club against Castleford ruling him out for the remainder of the season.

==== 2022 ====
Field started the 2022 season scoring and converting his try in a victory over Hull KR in the opening weekend of Super League. He then scored a hat-trick of tries and conversations in Wigan's round 2 victory over Leeds Rhinos. Field rack up a further eleven Super League tries across March and April, but did not score again in the league until late June where he went on to add a further six league tries to his tally. Field started the 2022 Challenge Cup Final on 28th May, after being pivotal in Wigan's cup run which saw him score his second hat-trick of the season in the quarter finals again Wakefield Trinity. Field scored in a 16–14 victory over Huddersfield which saw him lift his first major piece of silverwear of his career.

Field finished the season with 25 tries and four conversions for the club and was awarded Wigan Warriors Player of the Year and Player's Player of the Year, in addition to winning the RLWBA Player of the Year, and making the Super League Dream Team as fullback.

==== 2023 ====
Field scored in the opening three matches of the 2023 Super League, with his next score being a brace in round 7 in Wigan's 34–6 Battle of the Borough derby victory over the Leigh Leopards. However, Field suffered a hamstring injury during the game, keeping him sideload for two months. Field returned in June, and scored in Wigan's derby fixture against St Helens, but would lose the match. Field scored a hat-trick in Wigan's round 21 64–6 defeated of Hull Kingston Rovers, before scoring again in round 24 against Salford. The victory saw Wigan go top of the table for the first time since April and ultimately win the 2023 League Leaders' Shield.

Field scored a brace in Wigan's play off semi-final against Hull Kingston Rovers, winning the match 42–12. On 14 October, Field played in the 2023 Super League Grand Final, which saw Wigan defeat the Catalans Dragons 10–2 and win the 2023 Super League.

==== 2024 ====
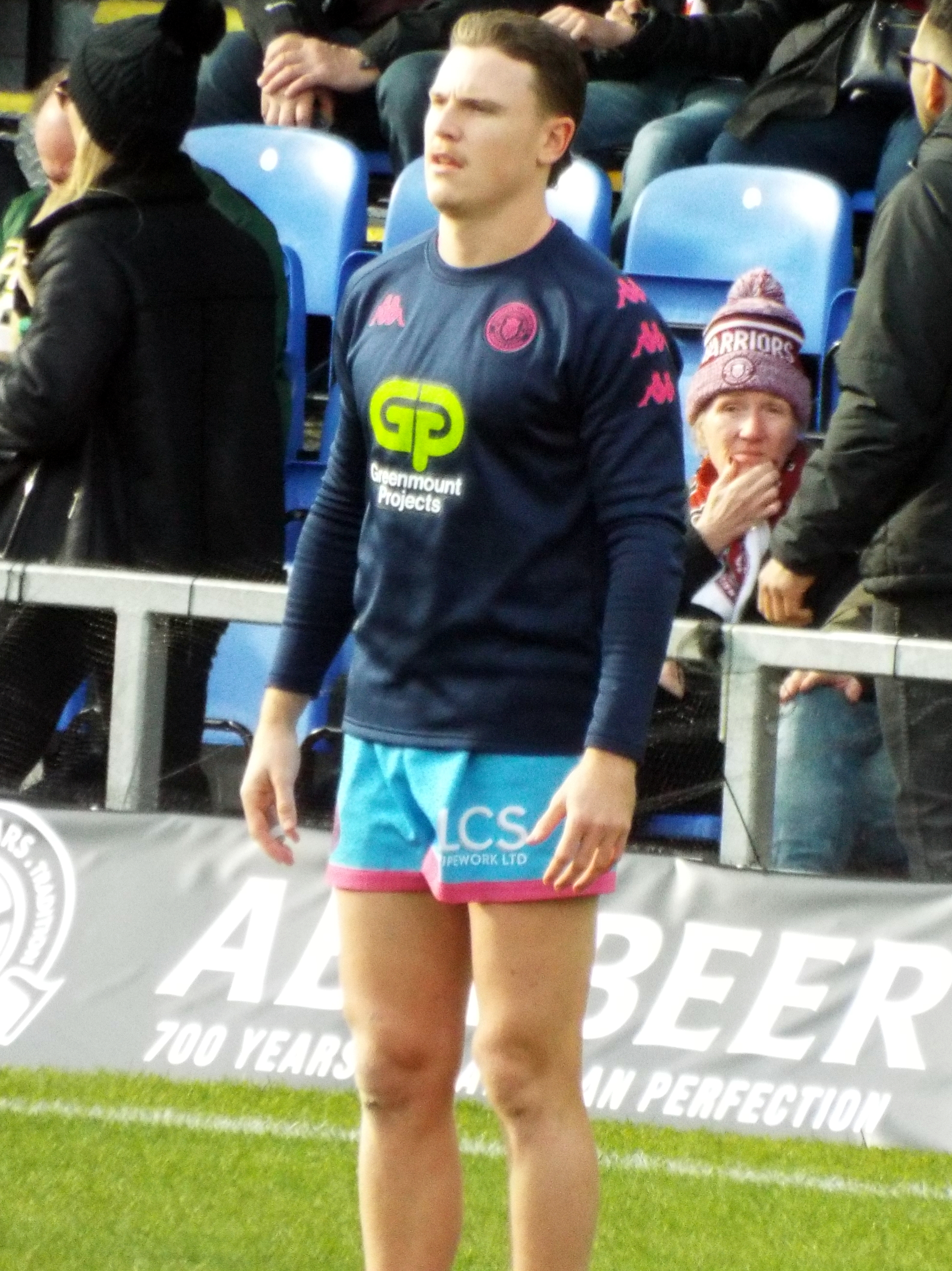
Field warming up for Wigan in 2024

Ahead of the 2024 season, Field signed a four-year contract extension with Wigan.

On 24 February, Field played in Wigan's 2024 World Club Challenge final victory over Penrith. On 8 June, Field played in Wigan's 2024 Challenge Cup final victory over Warrington. On 12 October, Field played in Wigan's 9-2 grand final victory over Hull Kingston Rovers.

==== 2025 ====
In round 2 of the 2025 Super League season, Field scored a hat-trick in Wigan's 46–4 victory over Hull F.C. He won Super League player of the month for February. In March, Field suffered a hamstring injury in Wigan's Challenge Cup exit to Hull F.C. Later that month he signed a new four-year deal, structured as a 2+1+1. At the end of season awards dinner, Field won Wigan Warriors Player of the Year, Players' Player of the Year, and Try of the Season. The next day, he was announced in the 2025 Super League Dream Team, marking his second inclusion. On 9 October 2025, Field played in Wigan's 24-6 2025 Super League Grand Final loss against Hull Kingston Rovers.

==== 2026 ====
After a strong start to the 2026 campaign scoring four tries in three appearances, Jai Field was admitted to hospital with appendicitis on 3 March ruling him out for 4 to 6 weeks. On 30 May, Field played in Wigan's 2026 Challenge Cup final victory against Hull Kingston Rovers.

== Honours ==
=== Wigan Warriors ===
- Super League
  - Winners (2): 2023, 2024
- League Leaders' Shield
  - Winners (3): 2023, 2024, 2026
- Challenge Cup
  - Winners (3): 2022, 2024, 2026
- World Club Challenge
  - Winners (1): 2024

=== Individual ===
- Super League Dream Team
  - Winners (2): 2022, 2025
- RLWBA Player of the Year:
  - Winners (1): 2022
- Wigan Warriors Player of the Year
  - Winners (2): 2022, 2025
- Wigan Warriors Players' Player of the Year
  - Winners (2): 2022, 2025

== Statistics ==
Year	Team	Games	Tries	Goals	Pts
2017	St. George Illawarra Dragons	3			
2018	St. George Illawarra Dragons	2			
2019	St. George Illawarra Dragons	6	1	7	18
2020	Parramatta Eels	6	3		12
2021	Wigan Warriors	4			
2022	Wigan Warriors	30	24	3	102
2023	Wigan Warriors	25	19		76
2024	Wigan Warriors	24	7		28
2025	Wigan Warriors	8	10		40
	Totals	108	64	10	276
