= Sam Halsall =

English professional rugby league footballer

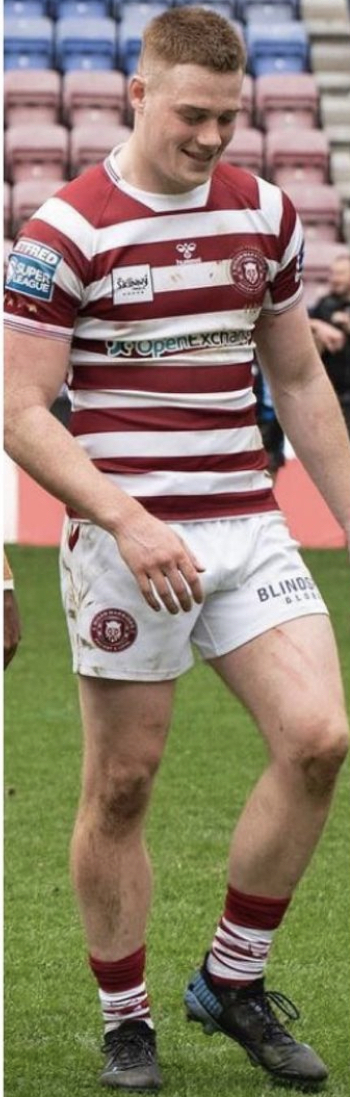

Personal information
- Full name: Samuel Halsall
- Born: 18 August 2001 (age 24) Lancaster, Lancashire, England
- Height: 6 ft 2 in (1.87 m)
- Weight: 13 st 10 lb (87 kg)

Playing information
- Position: Centre, Wing
Club
Years	Team	Pld	T	G	FG	P
2020–22	Wigan Warriors	18	8	0	0	32
2021(loan)	→ Newcastle Thunder	6	1	0	0	4
2022(loan)	→ Newcastle Thunder	11	13	0	0	52
2023–	Huddersfield Giants	58	22	0	0	88
	Total	93	44	0	0	176
- Source: As of 2 October 2025

Samuel Halsall (born 18 August 2001) is an English professional rugby league footballer who plays as a centre or winger for the Huddersfield Giants in the Super League.

He previously played for the Wigan Warriors in the Super League and has spent time on loan from Wigan at the Newcastle Thunder in the Championship.

== Background ==
Halsall played his amateur rugby league for the Shevington Sharks ARLFC.

== Career ==
=== Wigan ===
Halsall made his Super League debut in round 14 of the 2020 Super League season for the Warriors against St Helens where Wigan went on to lose 42–0 against a much more experienced St Helens squad. Halsall started the match playing at wing, and became Wigan Warriors player #1104.

=== Newcastle Thunder ===
On 4 June 2021, it was reported that he had signed for the Newcastle Thunder in the RFL Championship on loan.

=== Huddersfield Giants ===
In October 2022, Halsall signed for Huddersfield on a three-year deal. In round 9 of the 2023 Super League season, Halsall scored two tries for Huddersfield in a 26-14 victory over the Catalans Dragons. In round 21 of the 2023 Super League season, Halsall scored a hat-trick for Huddersfield in their 28-0 victory over Castleford. Halsall played 16 matches with Huddersfield in the 2023 Super League season as the club finished ninth on the table and missed the playoffs. Halsall played 18 games for Huddersfield in the 2024 Super League season as the club finished 9th on the table. Halsall played 21 matches for Huddersfield in the 2025 Super League season as the club finished 10th on the table.

== Personal life ==
Halsall was in a relationship with Hollyoaks actress Ruby O'Donnell from 2019 to 2023.
