= Jake Bibby =

English professional rugby league footballer

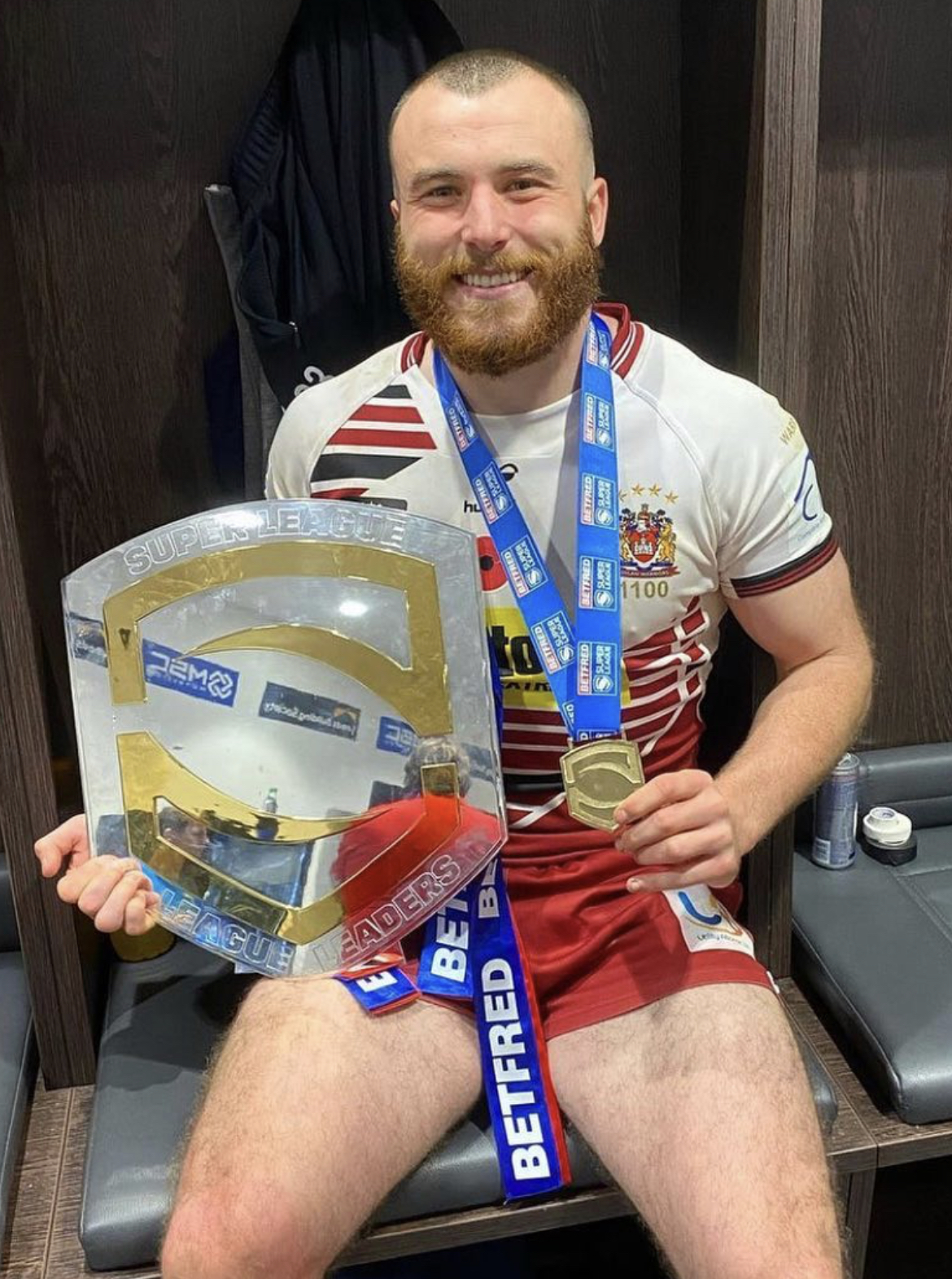

Personal information
- Full name: Jacob Bibby
- Born: 17 June 1996 (age 30) Wigan, Greater Manchester, England
- Height: 6 ft 0 in (1.83 m)
- Weight: 14 st 9 lb (93 kg)

Playing information
- Position: Wing, Centre
Club
Years	Team	Pld	T	G	FG	P
2015–19	Salford Red Devils	80	36	0	0	144
2016(loan)	→ Oldham	3	0	0	0	0
2016(loan)	→ N Wales Crusaders	3	1	0	0	4
2017(loan)	→ Halifax	3	0	0	0	0
2020–22	Wigan Warriors	74	28	0	0	120
2023–25	Huddersfield Giants	62	18	0	0	72
2026	Oldham	29	17	0	0	68
2027–	Salford RLFC	0	0	0	0	0
	Total	254	100	0	0	408
- Source: As of 16 October 2026

Jake Bibby (born 17 June 1996) is an English professional rugby league footballer who plays as a winger or centre for Salford RLFC in the RFL Championship.

He previously played for the Salford Red Devils and the Wigan Warriors in the Super League. Bibby spent time on loan from Salford for Oldham and Halifax in the Championship, and the North Wales Crusaders in League 1.

== Background ==
Bibby was born in Wigan, Greater Manchester, England.

== Playing career ==
=== Salford ===
Bibby made his Salford début in a Super League Super 8s match away at Hull Kingston Rovers on 27 September 2015.

He played in the 2019 Super League Grand Final defeat by St Helens at Old Trafford. He scored Salford’s only try of the night.

=== Halifax ===
He has made 3 appearances on Dual Registration for Halifax RLFC in 2017.

=== Wigan Warriors ===
Bibby moved to Wigan ahead of the 2020 Super League season. He played in the club's 8-4 2020 Super League Grand Final loss against St Helens at the Kingston Communications Stadium in Hull. Bibby scored a try for Wigan in the second half of the game.

In round 1 of the 2021 Super League season, he scored two tries for Wigan in a 20-18 victory over Leigh. The following week, he scored a hat-trick in Wigan's 34-6 victory over Wakefield. In round 6 of the 2021 Super League season, he scored two tries for Wigan in a 30-16 victory over Leigh. In round 1 of the 2022 Super League season, Bibby scored two tries in a 24-10 victory over Hull Kingston Rovers. On 28 May 2022, Bibby played for Wigan in their 2022 Challenge Cup Final victory over Huddersfield.

=== Huddersfield Giants ===
On 28 September 2022, Bibby signed a three-year deal with the Huddersfield Giants. Bibby played 17 matches with Huddersfield in the 2023 Super League season as the club finished ninth on the table and missed the playoffs. Bibby played 17 games for Huddersfield in the 2024 Super League season scoring seven tries as the club finished 9th on the table. Bibby played 26 games for Huddersfield in the 2025 Super League season as the club finished 10th on the table.

=== Oldham RLFC ===
On 31 October 2025 it was reported that he had signed for Oldham RLFC in the RFL Championship

=== Salford RLFC ===
On 14 October 2026 it was reported that he had signed for Salford RLFC in the RFL Championship

Bibby playing for Oldham in 2026

== Honours ==
=== Salford Red Devils ===
- Super League
  - Runners-up (1): 2019

=== Wigan Warriors ===
- League Leaders' Shield
  - Winners (1): 2020
- Challenge Cup
  - Winners (1): 2022
