= Joe Shorrocks =

English professional rugby league footballer

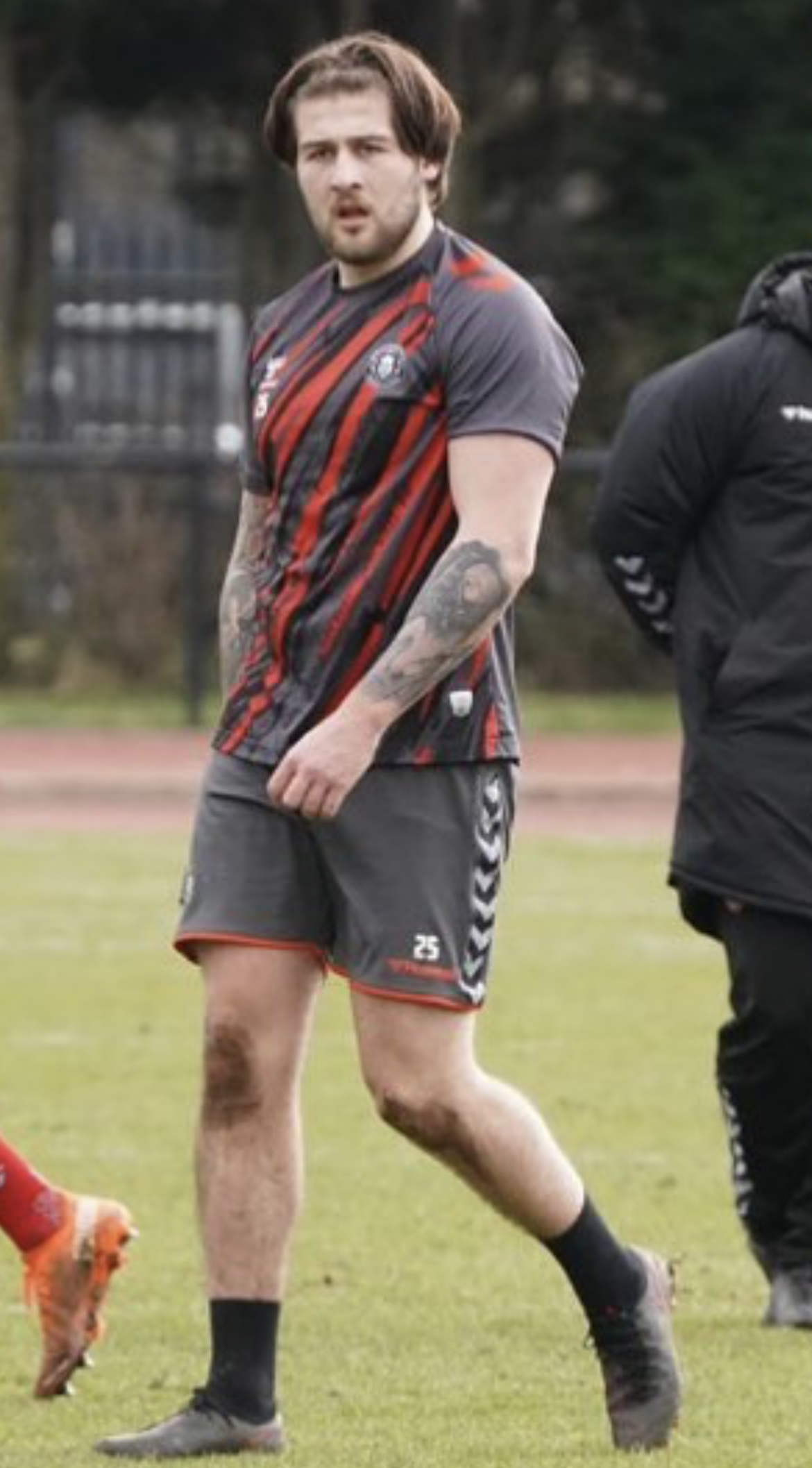

Personal information
- Full name: Joseph Shorrocks
- Born: 25 November 1999 (age 26) Billinge Higher End, Wigan, England
- Height: 6 ft 0 in (1.82 m)
- Weight: 14 st 11 lb (94 kg)

Playing information
- Position: Loose forward, Second-row
Club
Years	Team	Pld	T	G	FG	P
2019–23	Wigan Warriors	75	3	0	0	12
2019(loan)	→ London Skolars	1	0	0	0	0
2023(loan)	→ Leigh Leopards	4	1	0	0	4
2024–25	Salford Red Devils	44	2	0	0	8
2025(loan)	→ Leeds Rhinos	2	0	0	0	0
2026–	St Helens	18	2	0	0	8
	Total	144	8	0	0	32
- Source: As of 4 November 2026
- Relatives: Jake Shorrocks (brother)

Joseph Shorrocks (born 25 November 1999) is a professional rugby league footballer who plays as a second-row or loose forward for St Helens in the Super League.

He has spent time on loan from the Wigan Warriors at the London Skolars in Betfred League 1 and at the Leigh Leopards in Super League. Shorrocks also played for the Salford Red Devils in the Betfred Super League, and on loan from Salford at the Leeds Rhinos.

== Background ==
Shorrocks was born in Billinge Higher End, Wigan, England

== Playing career ==
=== Wigan Warriors ===
Shorrocks made his club debut for Wigan in round 10 of the 2019 Super League season against Wakefield Trinity. Shorrocks made 28 appearances for Wigan in the 2021 Super League season including their playoff loss to Leeds. In the 2022 Super League, Shorrocks played 20 games but did not feature in the clubs 2022 Challenge Cup final victory over Huddersfield.

Shorrocks played 15 games for Wigan in the 2023 Super League season. He did not play in the clubs 2023 Super League Grand Final victory over the Catalans Dragons.

=== Salford Red Devils ===
On 20 November 2023, it was reported that Shorrocks had signed for Salford on a three-year deal.

=== Leeds Rhinos (loan) ===
On 16 August 2025, it was reported that Shorrocks had signed for Leeds on loan for the remainder of the 2025 season.

=== St Helens ===
On 14 November 2025 it was reported that he had signed for St Helens RFC in the Super League on a one-year deal. Shorrocks made his club debut for St Helens in their 98-2 victory over Workington Town in round 3 of the 2026 Challenge Cup competition. Shorrocks played 25 games for St Helens in the 2026 Super League season as the club finished 7th on the table and missed the playoffs.
