= Umyla Hanley =

English rugby league footballer

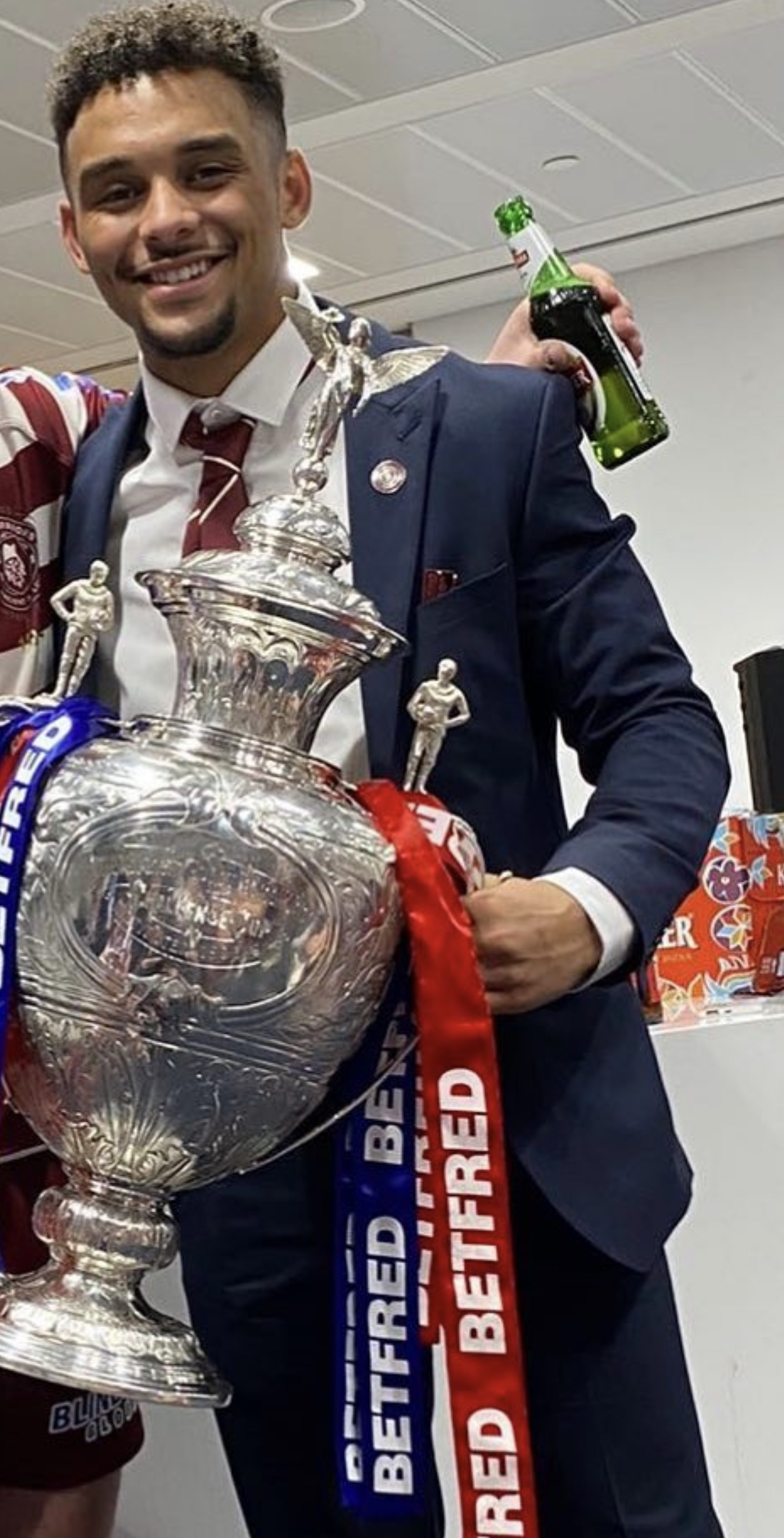

Personal information
- Full name: Umyla Hanley
- Born: 5 March 2002 (age 24) Wigan, Greater Manchester, England
- Height: 6 ft 0 in (1.83 m)
- Weight: 12 st 13 lb (82 kg)

Playing information
- Position: Centre, Wing
Club
Years	Team	Pld	T	G	FG	P
2020–22	Wigan Warriors	11	5	0	0	20
2022(loan)	→ Newcastle Thunder	10	2	0	0	8
2023–	Leigh Leopards	76	37	0	0	148
2023(loan)	→ Rochdale Hornets	5	5	0	0	20
	Total	102	49	0	0	196
- Source: As of 16 September 2026
- Father: Ellery Hanley

Umyla Hanley (born 5 March 2002) is a professional rugby league footballer who plays as a centre or winger for the Leigh Leopards in the Super League.

== Background ==
Hanley played his amateur rugby league for the Shevington Sharks and is the son of former Bradford, Wigan, Leeds, Western Suburbs, Balmain and Great Britain international, Ellery Hanley.

== Career ==
=== 2020 ===
Hanley made his Super League debut in round 14 of the 2020 Super League season for the Warriors against St Helens where Wigan went on to lose 42–0 against a much more experienced St Helens team, Hanley started at fullback and became Wigan Warrior player #1105.

=== 2021 ===
In round 17 of the 2021 Super League season, Hanley scored a hat-trick in Wigan's 50-6 victory over Leigh.

=== 2022 ===
Hanley made only one appearance for Wigan in the 2022 Super League season. He spent the majority of the year on loan with RFL Championship side Newcastle playing ten games.

=== 2024 ===
In round 6 of the 2024 Super League season, Hanley scored a hat-trick in Leigh's 32-22 loss against Salford.

=== 2025 ===
In round 3 of the 2025 Super League season, Hanley scored a hat-trick in Leigh's 34-6 home win against Catalan Dragons. Hanley played 24 games for Leigh in the 2025 Super League season including the clubs semi-final loss against Wigan.
