= Ethan Havard =

England international rugby league footballer

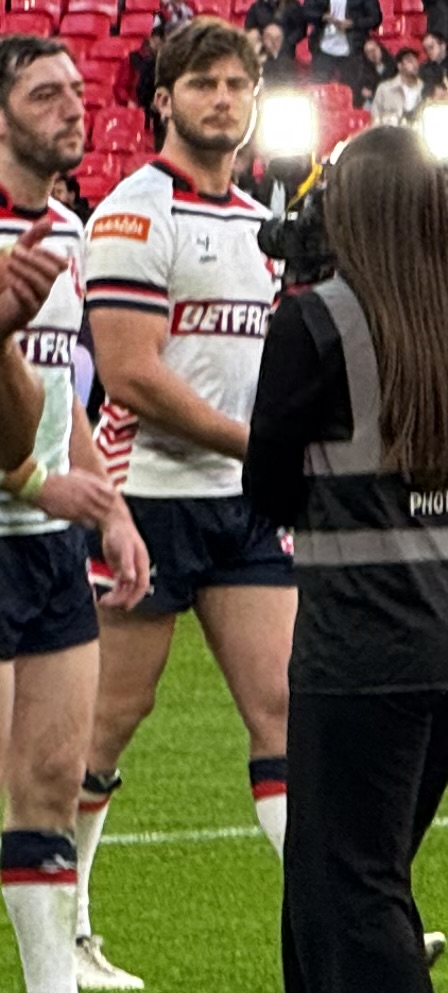

Personal information
- Full name: Joseph Ethan Havard
- Born: 26 October 2000 (age 26) Sofia, Bulgaria
- Height: 6 ft 4 in (1.92 m)
- Weight: 16 st 1 lb (102 kg)

Playing information
- Position: Prop
Club
Years	Team	Pld	T	G	FG	P
2019–	Wigan Warriors	144	10	0	0	40
Representative
Years	Team	Pld	T	G	FG	P
2022–	England Knights	1	0	0	0	0
2023–	England	5	1	0	0	4
- Source: As of 19 November 2026

Ethan Havard (born 26 October 2000) is an England international rugby league footballer who plays as a prop for the Wigan Warriors in the Super League. He has also played for the England Knights at international level.

== Early life ==
Born in Sofia, Bulgaria, Havard's family moved to Bath, Somerset in England when he was six months old before relocating to Wigan a few years later. He played junior rugby league for Wigan St Patricks, and was coached by his father, Keiron, who had a brief professional rugby league career with Salford.

== Career ==
=== Club ===
In 2019 he made his Super League début for Wigan against Wakefield Trinity.

Havard was charged with the Grade E offence of Eye Gouging for which he was sent off in the 79th minute of an Under-19s fixture against Newcastle Thunder. He denied the offence, and after appearing in front of an independent disciplinary, was found to be 'not guilty'. On 28 May 2022, Havard played for Wigan in their 2022 Challenge Cup Final victory over Huddersfield. On 14 October 2023, Havard was named as a substitute for Wigan, despite not being 100% fit, during their 2023 Super League Grand Final victory over the Catalans Dragons. He came off the bench (replacing Tyler Dupree at the time), but was substituted 10 minutes later as he suffered a hamstring injury. On 8 June 2024, Havard played in Wigan's 2024 Challenge Cup final victory over Warrington from the interchange bench. On 12 October 2024, Havard played in Wigan's 9-2 2024 Super League grand final victory over Hull Kingston Rovers. On 9 October 2025, Havard played in Wigan's 24-6 2025 Super League Grand Final loss against Hull Kingston Rovers. On 30 May 2026, Havard played in Wigan's 2026 Challenge Cup final victory against Hull Kingston Rovers.

=== International ===
Havard is eligible to represent Bulgaria by place of birth. However he declared for England in 2020 ahead of his first call up for the England Knights. On 29 April 2023, Havard made his England debut and scored a try as they defeated France 64–0 at the Halliwell Jones Stadium.

== Honours ==
=== Wigan Warriors ===
- Super League
  - Winners (2): 2023, 2024
- League Leaders' Shield
  - Winners (4): 2020, 2023, 2024, 2026
- Challenge Cup
  - Winners (3): 2022, 2024, 2026
