= Bevan French =

Australian professional rugby league footballer

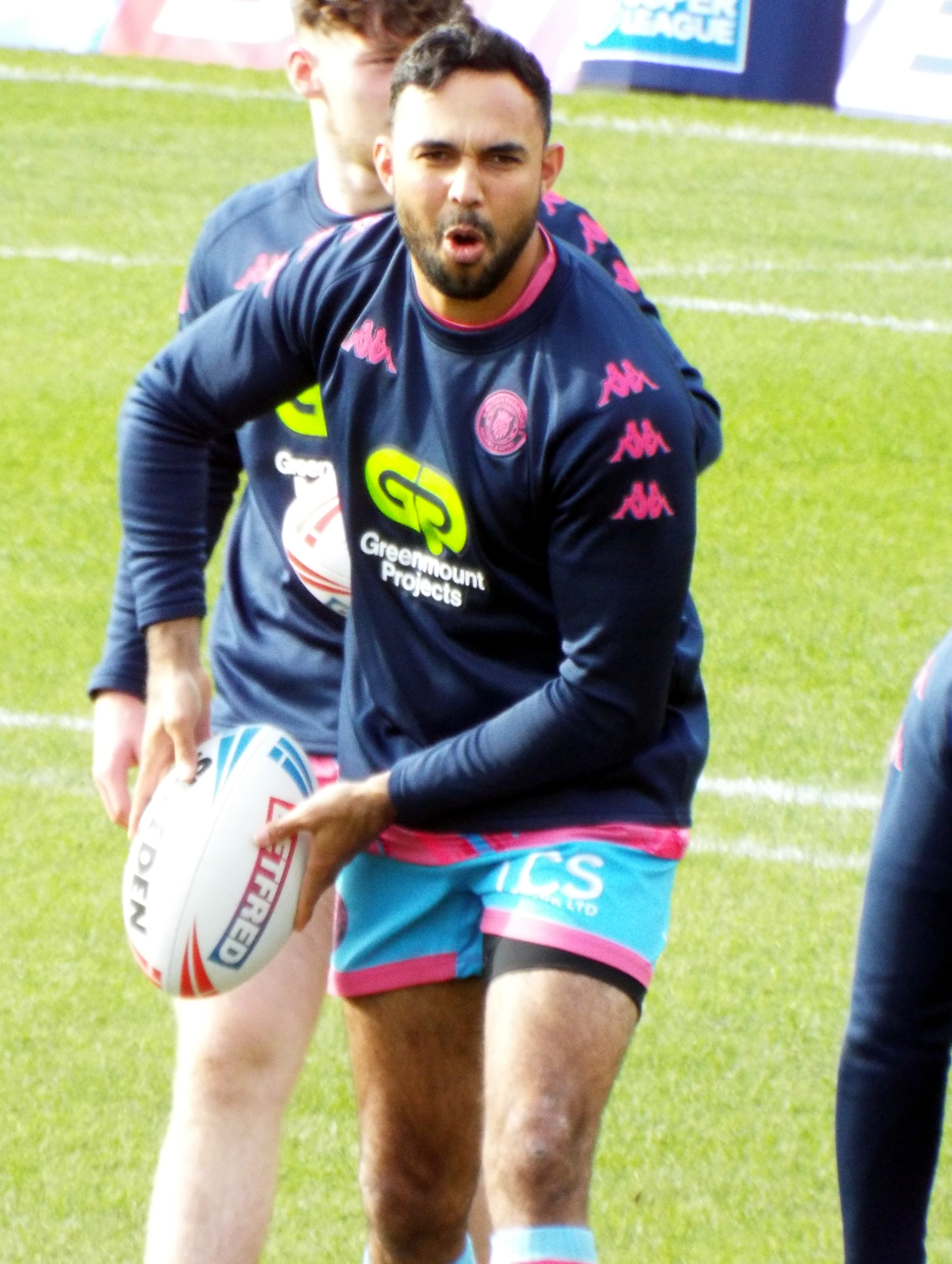

Personal information
- Full name: Bevan Lionel French
- Born: 4 January 1996 (age 30) Inverell, New South Wales, Australia
- Height: 5 ft 9 in (1.75 m)
- Weight: 13 st 8 lb (86 kg)

Playing information
- Position: Stand-off, Fullback, Wing
Club
Years	Team	Pld	T	G	FG	P
2016–18	Parramatta Eels	47	35	0	0	140
2019–	Wigan Warriors	154	128	0	1	513
	Total	201	163	0	1	653
Representative
Years	Team	Pld	T	G	FG	P
2017–19	Indigenous All Stars	2	1	0	0	4
- Source: As of 23 April 2025
- Relatives: Nathan Blacklock (uncle); Preston Campbell (cousin)

Bevan French (born 4 January 1996) is an Australian professional rugby league footballer who plays primarily as a stand-off, but also as a fullback or winger for Wigan Warriors in the Betfred Super League.

French began his career playing for amateur club Tingha Tigers, playing first team rugby at age 15. In 2013, he signed for Parramatta Eels in the NRL, making his first team debut the year after. In 2019, he left Parramatta for Wentworthville Magpies in the NSW Cup where he played for six months before joining Wigan. Internationally, he has represented the Indigenous All Stars.

With Wigan, French has won two Super League Grand Finals (in 2023, and 2024), three Challenge Cup finals (in 2022, 2024, and 2026), in addition to the World Club Challenge in 2024. The 2024 campaign saw him become the first player in British rugby league history to win Man of the Match in all three finals.

== Background ==
French was born in Inverell, New South Wales, Australia, and is of Indigenous Australian descent. He is the nephew of former Australian international and St George Illawarra Dragons winger Nathan Blacklock.

He played his junior rugby league for the Tingha Tigers. French was educated and 2013 graduate at Inverell High School.

== Playing career ==
=== Early career ===
At the age of 15, French began playing for Tingha's first-grade team at fullback, playing against men twice his age.

Early in 2013, French was pursued by six NRL clubs; Parramatta, Melbourne, Newcastle, Gold Coast, Penrith and St. George Illawarra. He eventually signed for the Parramatta Eels, stating that he chose the club because he "just had a feeling".

=== Parramatta Eels ===
==== 2015 ====
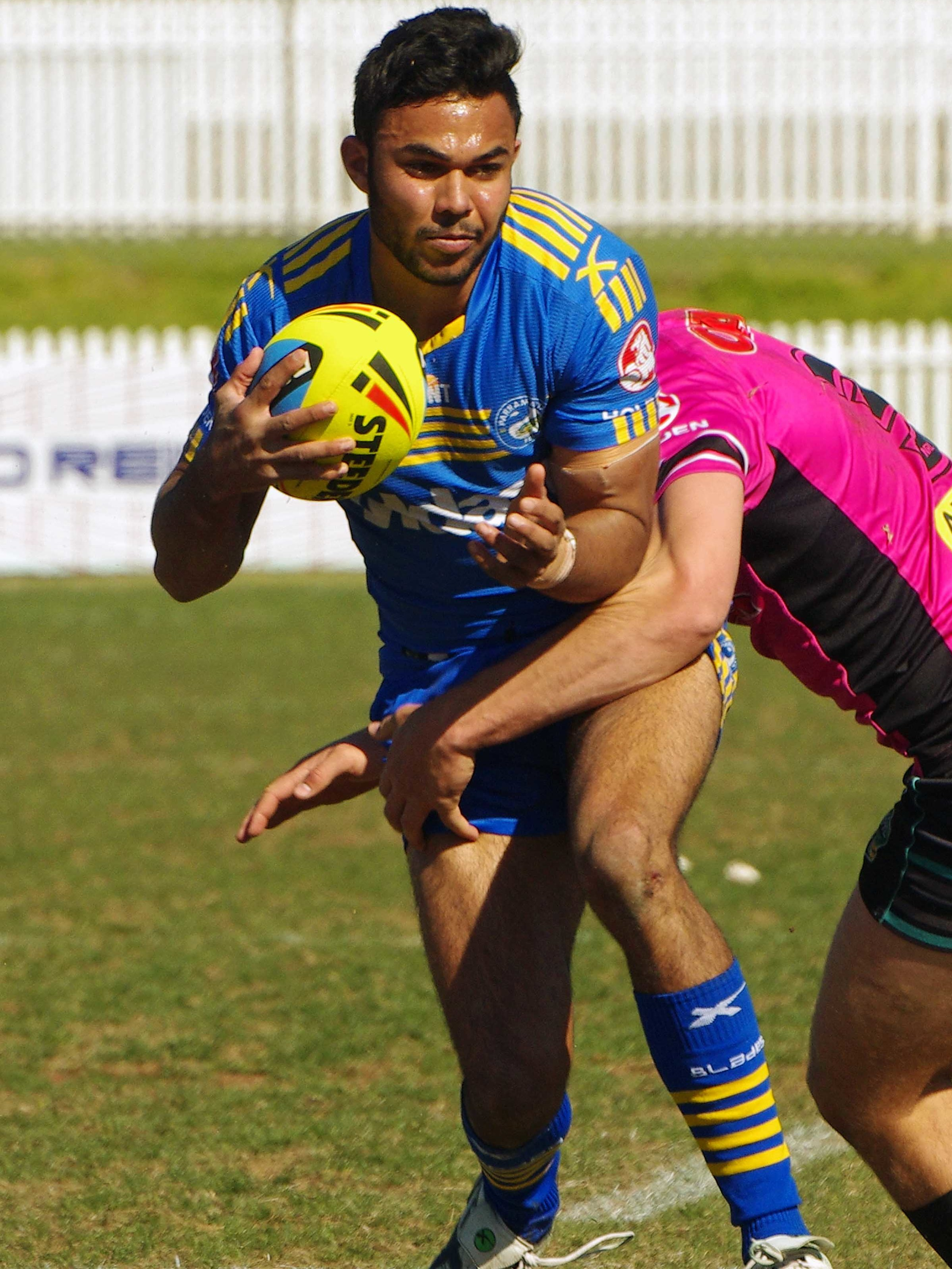
French playing for the Parramatta Eels in 2015

In 2015 and 2016, he played for the Eels' NYC team. In 2015, he began the season at five-eighth, before moving back to fullback for the remainder of the year, finishing the season with 16 tries in 22 games. On 11 July 2015, he re-signed with the Parramatta club on a three-year contract to the end of the 2018 season.

==== 2016 ====
In February, French participated in Eels' 2016 NRL Auckland Nines tournament win, scoring 8 tries in the tournament, the record for most tries in a Nines tournament. He was also named in the team of the tournament. In Round 12 of the 2016 NRL season, French made his NRL debut against the Newcastle Knights, scoring a try in the 20–18 win at Hunter Stadium. In Round 15, against the South Sydney Rabbitohs, French scored his first double in Parramatta's 30–12 win at ANZ Stadium. In Round 17, against the Cronulla-Sutherland Sharks, French scored his first hat-trick in Parramatta's 34–24 loss at Shark Park. In the last two matches of the regular season, French switched with Michael Gordon to play from the wing to fullback, scoring two hat-tricks in two weeks in a row in Parramatta's 30–18 win against the St. George Illawarra Dragons and 40–18 win against the New Zealand Warriors. French went on to be a try-scoring sensation in his debut season the NRL, being the club's highest try-scorer with 19 tries in 13 matches in 2016.

==== 2017 ====
On 10 February 2017, French represented the Indigenous All Stars against the World All Stars in the 2017 All Stars match, playing off the interchange bench in the 34–8 win at Hunter Stadium. French played 16 games for Parramatta in the 2017 season—scoring 9 tries—but missed most of the season with a hamstring injury. French was injured just before the start of the finals series—Parramatta's first in eight seasons—and missed both finals games against Melbourne and North Queensland.

==== 2018 ====
French started the 2018 season at fullback ahead of Clint Gutherson (who was still out with an injury) and the returning Jarryd Hayne. In round 3 of the season, French injured his shoulder in the 14–4 loss to Cronulla and missed the following two games. He was then recalled to the side to face Canberra, but was criticised by fans and the media after the match; he only made 15 metres throughout the game. French was dropped by coach Brad Arthur for the following week. French spoke of his demotion, saying:

We spoke about how my shoulder was going to be in pain going into the game and getting a needle before the game that was supposedly meant to numb it for six hours or something, but 15 minutes in I felt it.

On 2 June 2018, French was named at fullback for Parramatta's round 13 clash against Newcastle, but was taken from the field only two minutes into the match due to a head collision involving Newcastle player Kalyn Ponga.

On 13 July 2018, Parramatta—who were in last place on the ladder—played against Newcastle; with 34 seconds remaining, French crossed over to score the match-winning try—only for the decision to be overturned by the Bunker, who saw that French had put a foot into touch while grounding the ball. Newcastle held on to win the game 18–16.

On 7 August, French was demoted to reserve grade by coach Brad Arthur. It came in the wake of French speaking to the media a week earlier, declaring he was open to the idea of leaving Parramatta if he was not given a chance to play fullback.

=== Wentworthville Magpies ===
==== 2019 ====
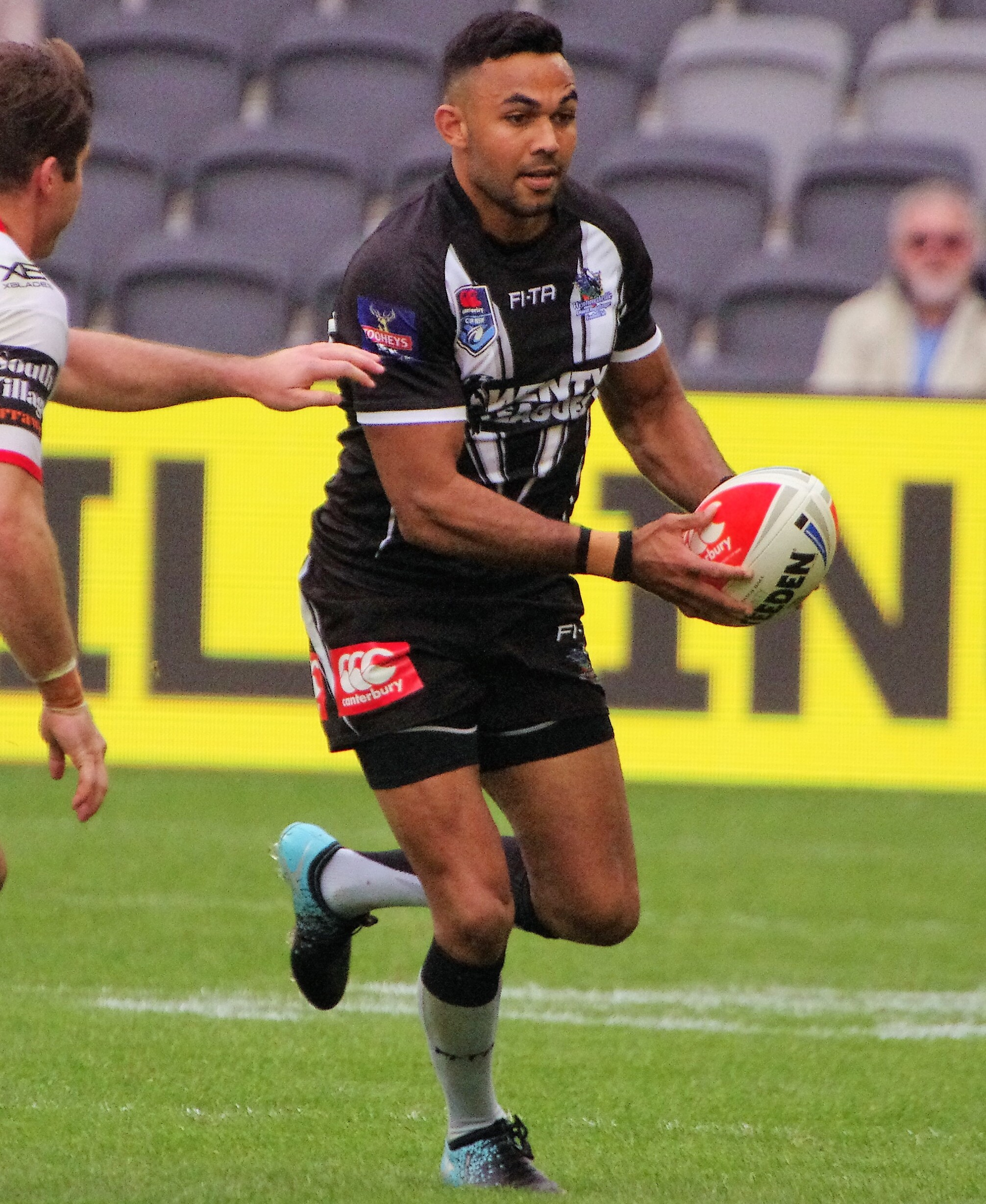
French playing for the Wentworthville Magpies in 2019

French was left out of the Parramatta's 2019 NRL squad, with head coach Brad Arthur selecting Blake Ferguson and Maika Sivo for wing and Clint Gutherson for fullback. This saw French play for the Wentworthville Magpies, one of Parramatta's feeder clubs, during the first half on the 2019 season.

On 22 April 2019, French scored the first ever try at the new Western Sydney Stadium for the Wentworthville Magpies against Western Suburbs in a 20–14 victory.

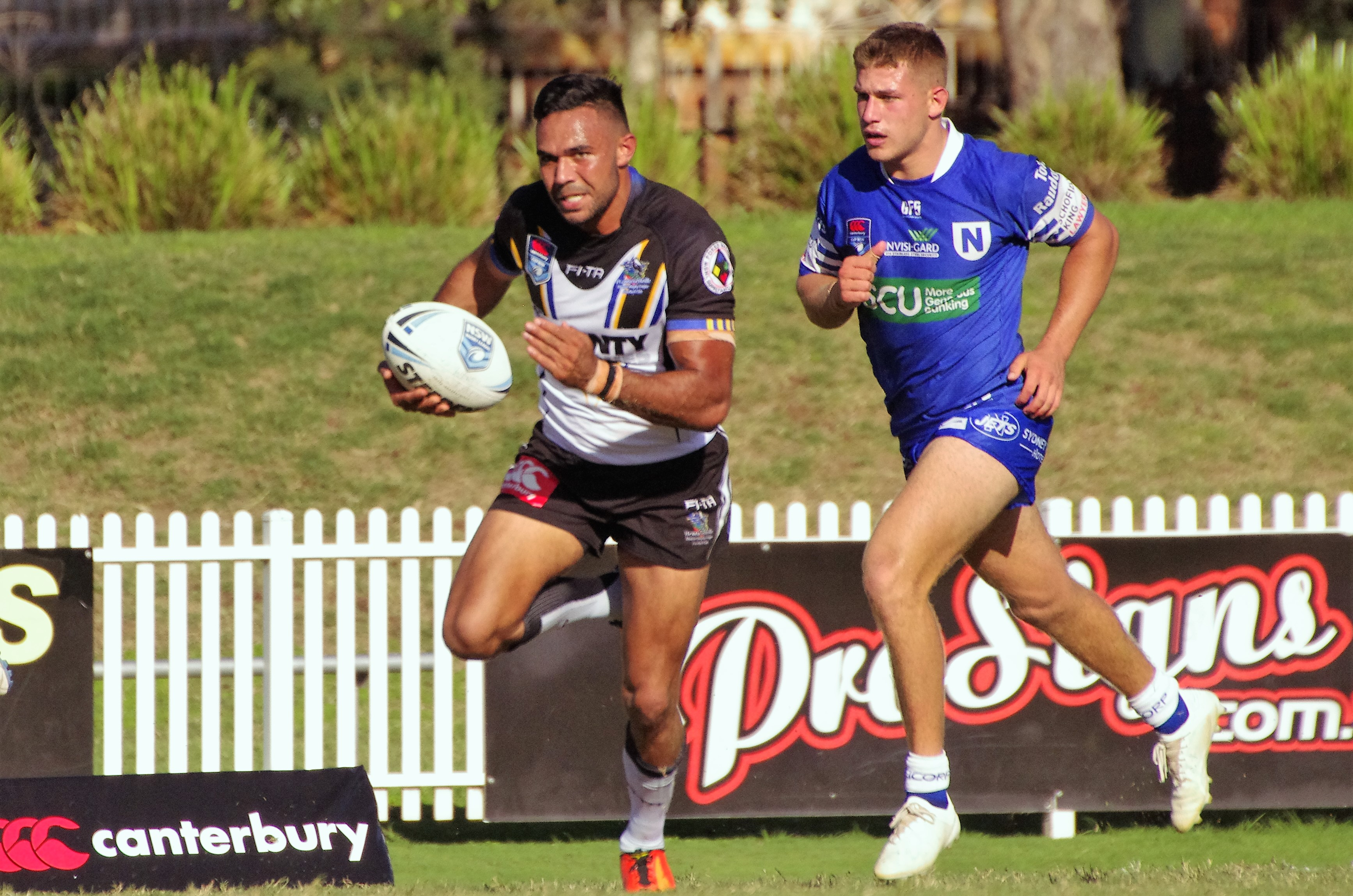
French playing for Wentworthville in 2019

French made 15 appearances and scored 13 tries for Wentworthville in the NSW Cup during his time at the club.

=== Wigan Warriors ===
==== 2019 ====
On 27 July, French signed a two-year contract with Super League side Wigan Warriors.

French made his debut appearance for Wigan against Hull KR coming off the bench in a 36–18 victory.

==== 2020 ====
French played in the 2020 Super League Grand Final for Wigan, which the club lost 8–4 against St Helens.

==== 2021 ====
After missing the opening three rounds of the 2021 Super League season, French returned for Wigan's round 4 match and scored two tries in a 22–12 victory over Castleford.

French injured his hamstring in the round 7 match against Salford. He was initially ruled out for twelve weeks with a torn hamstring. Wigan later put out a statement, on 28 June, clarifying that French's injury was worse than first expected. He was ruled out for the rest of the 2021 Super League season and would return to Australia to be with family during his rehabilitation. At the same time, French triggered a clause in his contract, meaning that he would remain at the club for the 2022 season.

==== 2022 ====
On 28 May, French played for Wigan in their 2022 Challenge Cup Final win over Huddersfield.

In round 15 of the 2022 Super League season, French scored a hat-trick in Wigan's 30–12 victory over Salford.

In round 18, French scored two tries for Wigan in a 20–18 loss against St Helens at Magic Weekend.

The following week, French scored a Super League record seven tries in Wigan's 60–0 victory over Hull F.C. to overtake the six tries that Lesley Vainikolo scored against Hull F.C. in 2005.

In round 21, French scored a hat-trick in Wigan's 46–4 victory over Hull Kingston Rovers.

In round 24, French scored another hat-trick in Wigan's 52–6 victory over Toulouse Olympique. On 4 September, French made the Super League dream team. French finished the regular season with 33 tries in 23 appearances for Wigan.

On 20 September 2022, Wigan confirmed that French had signed a new two-year contract, keeping him at the club until 2024.

==== 2023 ====
In round 2 of the 2023 Super League season, French scored two tries for Wigan in a 60–0 victory over Wakefield Trinity.

In round 5, French scored two tries in Wigan's narrow 14–12 victory over Huddersfield.

In the Challenge Cup Last 16 away to Leeds the following week, French scored twice and crucially denied Harry Newman a try as Wigan came back to win 18–14.

French scored in defeats to both the Catalans Dragons at Magic Weekend and St Helens. In round 20, French scored two tries in Wigan's 44–18 victory over Leigh. In October, French was named as the winner of the 2023 Steve Prescott MBE Man of Steel award.

On 14 October, French played in Wigan's 2023 Super League Grand Final victory over the Catalans Dragons.

==== 2024 ====
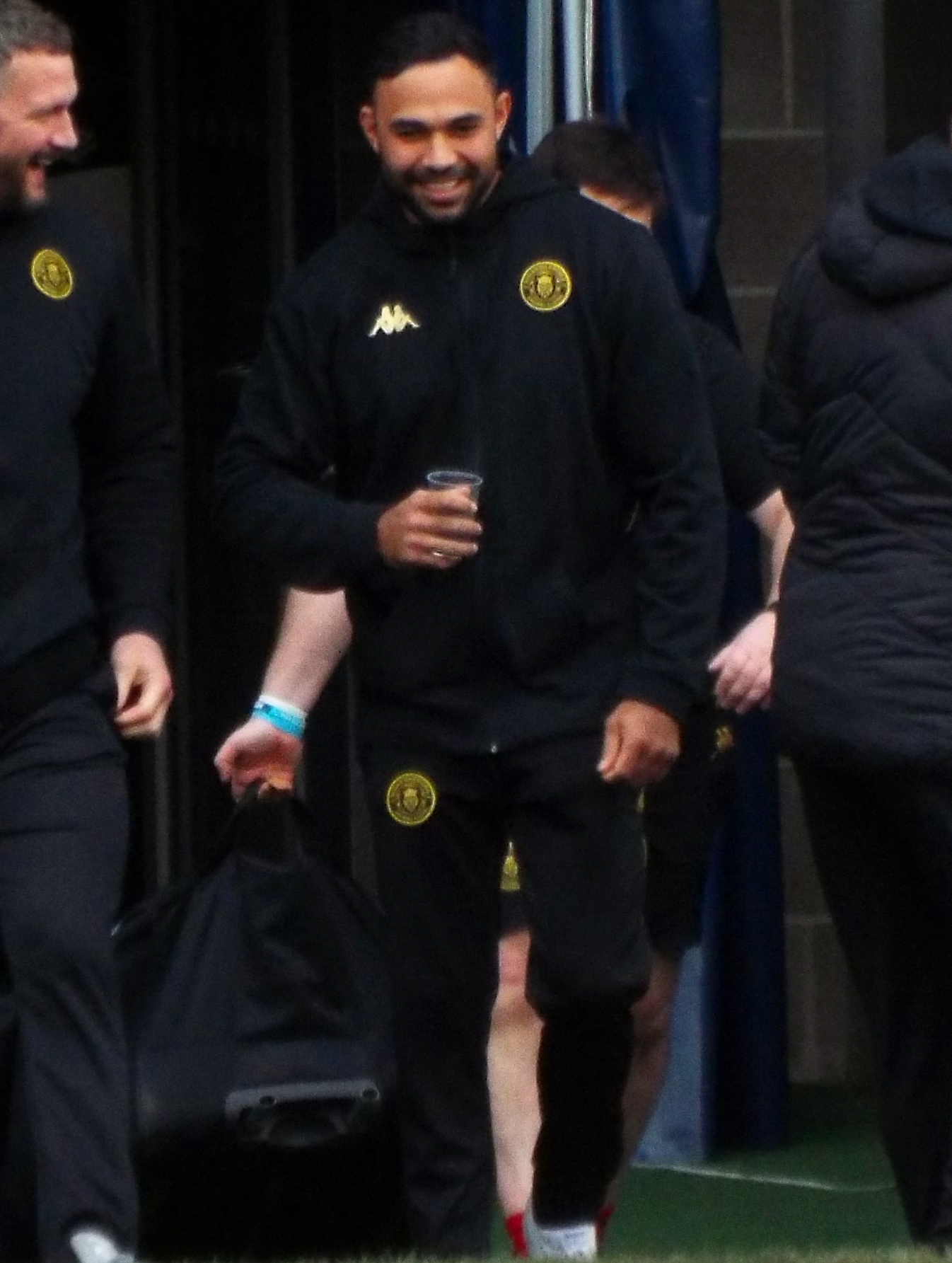
French pre-match for Wigan in 2024

On 24 February, French played in Wigan's 2024 World Club Challenge final victory over Penrith, and was awarded Man of the Match. French scored Wigan's only try in their 12–4 Good Friday Derby defeat against St Helens. On 3 April, French signed a new four-year deal with the club.

On 8 June, French started for Wigan in 2024 Challenge Cup final. He scored one try in the game in the 18–8 victory over Warrington, and was awarded the Lance Todd Trophy as man of the match. Wigan retained both the League Leaders' Shield and Super League title, with French winning the Rob Burrow Award in the Grand Final, having scored the only try of the match. Sky Sports praised French at the end of the season for consistent ability to change the course of a game with individual skill.

The 2024 season saw French become the first player in British rugby league history to win both the Lance Todd Trophy and Harry Sunderland / Rob Burrow Award in the same season, having done so also winning the Bill Ashurst medal in the 2024 World Club Challenge.

==== 2025 ====
French was a standout player in Wigan's Vegas 48–24 win over Warrington, scoring one try and winning player of the match. On 9 October, French played in Wigan's 24–6 2025 Super League Grand Final loss against Hull Kingston Rovers.

==== 2026 ====
In round four of the 2026 season, French tore his hamstring, ruling him out for four months. On 30 May, French played in Wigan's 2026 Challenge Cup final victory against Hull Kingston Rovers.

== Personal life ==
During his absence due to injury, midway through the 2021 season, French returned home to Australia for his rehabilitation due to his mother's Motor Neurone Disease worsening. She died during this time. French was granted compassionate leave by Wigan, returning to the UK two months into the 2022 season.

== Honours ==
=== Wigan Warriors ===
- Super League
  - Winner (2): 2023, 2024
- League Leaders' Shield
  - Winner (4): 2020, 2023, 2024, 2026
- Challenge Cup
  - Winner (3): 2022, 2024, 2026
- World Club Challenge
  - Winner (1): 2024

=== Individual ===
- Man of Steel:
  - Winner: 2023
- Super League Dream Team
  - Winner: 2020, 2022, 2023
- Rob Burrow Award
  - Winner: 2024
- Lance Todd Trophy
  - Winner: 2024
- RLWBA Player of the Year:
  - Winner: 2020
- Albert Goldthorpe Medal:
  - Winner: 2023
- Wigan Warriors Player of the Year
  - Winner: 2020
- Wigan Warriors Players' Player of the Year
  - Winner: 2020

== Statistics ==
Year	Team	Games	Tries	Pts
2016	Parramatta Eels	13	19	76
2017	Parramatta Eels	16	9	36
2018	Parramatta Eels	18	7	28
2019	Wigan Warriors	8	6	32
2020	Wigan Warriors	21	17	72
2021	Wigan Warriors	5	3	12
2022	Wigan Warriors	24	31	124
2023	Wigan Warriors	32	19	76
2024	Wigan Warriors	14	16	64
2025	Wigan Warriors	14	10	40
	Totals	173	142	588
