= 2022 Super League season =

Rugby league season 2022

Super League XXVII
- League: Super League
- Duration: 27 rounds
- Teams: 12
- Matches played: 162
- Points scored: 6,957
- Highest attendance: 60,783; Grand Final (24 September)
- Lowest attendance: 2,607; Salford Red Devils vs Catalans Dragons (17 July)
- Average attendance: 8,356
- Total attendance: 1,353,785
- Broadcast partners: (United Kingdom) Sky Sports; (United Kingdom) Channel 4; (United Kingdom) BBC Sport (highlights); (Australia) Fox League; (United States) Fox Soccer Plus; (Europe) Sport Klub; (Europe) beIN Sports

2022 season
- Champions: St Helens; 10th Super League title 17th British title
- League Leaders Shield: St Helens
- Runners-up: Leeds Rhinos
- Biggest home win: Salford Red Devils 74–10 Wakefield Trinity (26 June)
- Biggest away win: Hull FC 6–60 St Helens (14 August)
- Man of Steel: (Australia) Brodie Croft
- Top point-scorer: (England) Tommy Makinson (210)
- Top try-scorer: (Australia) Bevan French (31)

Promotion and relegation
- Promoted from Championship: Leigh Centurions
- Relegated to Championship: Toulouse Olympique

Super League XXVII, known as the 2022 Betfred Super League for sponsorship reasons, was the 27th season of the Super League and 128th season of rugby league in Great Britain.

The season commenced on 10 February 2022 and ended with the Grand Final on 24 September 2022.

St Helens were the reigning champions going into Super League XXVII, after successfully retaining their title, beating Catalans Dragons in the 2021 Grand Final.

For the first time in Super League, there were two French teams in the competition, as Toulouse Olympique were promoted from the Championship, by beating Featherstone Rovers in the 2021 Million Pound Game.

Toulouse were immediately relegated back to the Championship, following a 14–24 defeat at home to Catalans Dragons on 25 August, having only won 5 games from 25 they were rooted to the bottom of the table and with only 2 games of the regular season remaining and 4 points to play for, they could not catch Wakefield in 11th place.

On 15 July 2022, Bevan French broke the record for most tries scored in a Super League game, during Wigan Warriors 60–0 win over Hull FC, scoring seven tries. The previous record for most tries scored in a Super League game was held by Lesley Vainikolo, who scored six tries for Bradford Bulls - also against Hull - in 2005.

== Teams ==
Locations of Super League XXVII teams in England
Locations of Super League XXVII teams in France

Legend
C	Reigning Champions
L	Previous season League Leaders
P	Promoted

	Team	2021 position	Stadium	Capacity	City/Town
	Castleford Tigers (2022 season)	7th	Wheldon Road	12,000	Castleford, West Yorkshire
L	Catalans Dragons (2022 season)	1st (play-off runners-up)	Stade Gilbert Brutus	13,000	Perpignan, Pyrénées-Orientales, France
	Huddersfield Giants (2022 season)	9th	John Smith's Stadium	24,121	Huddersfield, West Yorkshire
	Hull FC (2022 season)	8th	MKM Stadium	25,400	Kingston upon Hull, East Riding of Yorkshire
	Hull Kingston Rovers (2022 season)	6th	Craven Park	12,225	Kingston upon Hull, East Riding of Yorkshire
	Leeds Rhinos (2022 season)	5th	Headingley Stadium	21,062	Leeds, West Yorkshire
	Salford Red Devils (2022 season)	11th	AJ Bell Stadium	12,000	Salford, Greater Manchester
C	St Helens (2022 season)	2nd (champions)	Totally Wicked Stadium	18,000	St Helens, Merseyside
P	Toulouse Olympique (2022 season)	Championship Winners and League Leaders	Stade Ernest-Wallon	19,500	Toulouse, Occitanie, France
	Wakefield Trinity (2022 season)	10th	Belle Vue	9,333	Wakefield, West Yorkshire
	Warrington Wolves (2022 season)	3rd	Halliwell Jones Stadium	15,200	Warrington, Cheshire
	Wigan Warriors (2022 season)	4th	DW Stadium	25,133	Wigan, Greater Manchester

== Fixtures and results ==
=== Golden point extra time ===
If a match ends in a draw after 80 minutes, then a further 10 minutes of golden point extra time is played, to determine a winner (5 minutes each way). The first team to score either a try, penalty goal or drop goal during this period, will win the match. However, if there are no further scores during the additional 10 minutes period, then the match will end in a draw.

==== Game 1 (Leeds Rhinos v Huddersfield Giants) ====
The round 8 game between Leeds Rhinos and Huddersfield Giants on 14 April 2022, finished 20-all after 80 minutes. The game then went to extra time, which saw numerous drop goal attempts by both teams. Neither teams were able to score any points during the extra 10 minutes, which meant the match ended as a draw for the first time this season.

==== Game 2 (Wakefield Trinity v Hull FC) ====
The round 14 game between Wakefield Trinity and Hull FC on 5 June 2022, finished 18-all after 80 minutes. The game then went to extra time, which saw numerous drop goal attempts by both teams. Wakefield eventually won the match 19–18, with a drop goal from Jacob Miller.

==== Game 3 (Castleford Tigers v Catalans Dragons) ====
The round 16 game between Castleford Tigers and Catalans Dragons on 26 June 2022, finished 16-all after 80 minutes. The game then went to extra time, which saw numerous drop goal attempts by both teams. Castleford won the match 17–16, with a drop goal from Danny Richardson.

==== Game 4 (Wakefield Trinity v St Helens) ====
The round 20 game between Wakefield Trinity v St Helens on 24 July 2022, finished 12-all after 80 minutes. The game then went to extra time, which saw numerous drop goal attempts by both teams. St Helens won the match 13–12, with a drop goal from Jack Welsby.

==== Game 5 (Catalans Dragons v Leeds Rhinos) ====
The round 21 game between Catalans Dragons and Leeds Rhinos on 30 July 2022, finished 32-all after 80 minutes, despite Leeds trailing 6-30, and with only 12 men, the game then went to extra time, which saw numerous drop goal attempts by both teams. Leeds won the match 36–32, with a try from Aiden Sezer.

==== Game 6 (Huddersfield Giants v Wakefield Trinity) ====
The round 27 game between Huddersfield Giants and Wakefield Trinity on 2 September 2022, finished 14-all after 80 minutes, which saw numerous drop goal attempts by both teams. This was the third time that Wakefield had been taken to extra time, whilst this was Huddersfield's second. Huddersfield eventually won the match 16–14, with a penalty goal from Will Pryce.

== Table ==
Pos	Team	Pld	W	D	L	PF	PA	PD	Pts	Qualification
1	St Helens (C, L)	27	21	0	6	674	374	+300	42	Advance to semi-finals
2	Wigan Warriors	27	19	0	8	818	483	+335	38	Advance to semi-finals
3	Huddersfield Giants	27	17	1	9	613	497	+116	35	Advance to elimination finals
4	Catalans Dragons	27	16	0	11	539	513	+26	32	Advance to elimination finals
5	Leeds Rhinos	27	14	1	12	577	528	+49	29	Advance to elimination finals
6	Salford Red Devils	27	14	0	13	700	602	+98	28	Advance to elimination finals
7	Castleford Tigers	27	13	0	14	544	620	−76	26	
8	Hull Kingston Rovers	27	12	0	15	498	608	−110	24	
9	Hull FC	27	11	0	16	508	675	−167	22	
10	Wakefield Trinity	27	10	0	17	497	648	−151	20	
11	Warrington Wolves	27	9	0	18	568	664	−96	18	
12	Toulouse Olympique (R)	27	5	0	22	421	745	−324	10	Relegated to the Championship

(C) Champions; (L) League Leaders' Shield winners; (R) Relegated

== Play-offs ==
The top two teams in the regular season table (St Helens and Wigan Warriors) received byes to the semi-finals. The four teams who finish third to sixth contested the two elimination finals, with the winners of those two games moving on to the semi-finals.

=== Team bracket ===
Eliminators
4	Catalans Dragons	10
5	Leeds Rhinos	20
3	Huddersfield Giants	0
6	Salford Red Devils	28

Semi-finals
2	Wigan Warriors	8
5	Leeds Rhinos	20
1	St Helens	19
6	Salford Red Devils	12

Grand Final
5	Leeds Rhinos	12
1	St Helens	24

=== Summary ===
Home	Score	Away	Match Information
Home	Score	Away	Date and Time (Local)	Venue	Referee	Attendance
Eliminators
Catalans Dragons	10–20	Leeds Rhinos	9 September 2022, 20:00	Stade Gilbert Brutus	James Child	9,514
Huddersfield Giants	0–28	Salford Red Devils	10 September 2022, 13:00	John Smith's Stadium	Robert Hicks	6,327
Semi-finals
Wigan Warriors	8–20	Leeds Rhinos	16 September 2022, 20:00	DW Stadium	Liam Moore	12,777
St Helens	19–12	Salford Red Devils	17 September 2022, 13:00	Totally Wicked Stadium	Chris Kendall	12,357
Grand Final
St Helens	24–12	Leeds Rhinos	24 September 2022, 18:00	Old Trafford	Liam Moore	60,783

== Player statistics ==
=== Top 10 try scorers ===
Rank	Player	Club	Tries
1	(Australia) Bevan French	Wigan Warriors	31
2	(Australia) Ken Sio	Salford Red Devils	26
3=	(England) Tommy Makinson	St Helens	22
3=	(England) Liam Marshall	Wigan Warriors	22
5=	(France) Fouad Yaha	Catalans Dragons	20
5=	(Australia) Jai Field	Wigan Warriors	20
7	(England) Derrell Olpherts	Castleford Tigers	18
8=	(England) Ash Handley	Leeds Rhinos	17
8=	(England) Lewis Murphy	Wakefield Trinity	17
9=	(England) Chris McQueen	Huddersfield Giants	15
9=	(England) Joe Burgess	Salford Red Devils	15

=== Top 10 try assists ===
Rank	Player	Club	Assists
1	(England) Jake Connor	Hull FC	33
2	(Tonga) Tui Lolohea	Huddersfield Giants	29
3=	(Australia) Brodie Croft	Salford Red Devils	25
3=	(England) Jack Welsby	St Helens	25
5	(Australia) Jai Field	Wigan Warriors	22
6=	(England) Ryan Brierley	Salford Red Devils	21
6=	(Australia) Jacob Miller	Wakefield Trinity	21
8	(England) George Williams	Warrington Wolves	20
9	(England) Harry Smith	Wigan Warriors	19
10	(England) Jonny Lomax	St Helens	18

=== Top 10 goal scorers ===
Rank	Player	Club	Goals	Missed Goals	Drop Goals	Goal Percentage
1	(England) Marc Sneyd	Salford Red Devils	97	30	2	76%
2	(England) Harry Smith	Wigan Warriors	90	20	2	81%
3	(Papua New Guinea) Rhyse Martin	Leeds Rhinos	78	20	0	79%
4=	(England) Tommy Makinson	St Helens	66	34	0	65%
4=	(England) Stefan Ratchford	Warrington Wolves	64	11	0	84%
6	(England) Chris Hankinson	Toulouse Olympique	61	13	0	82%
7	(England) Sam Tomkins	Catalans Dragons	46	17	3	75%
8	(Australia) Mason Lino	Wakefield Trinity	45	15	1	78%
9=	(England) Gareth O'Brien	Castleford Tigers	42	16	0	72%
9=	(England) Will Pryce	Huddersfield Giants	42	16	0	70%

=== Top 10 points scorers ===
Rank	Player	Club	Points
1=	(England) Marc Sneyd	Salford Red Devils	216
1=	(England) Tommy Makinson	St Helens	216
3	(England) Harry Smith	Wigan Warriors	206
4	(Papua New Guinea) Rhyse Martin	Leeds Rhinos	194
5	(England) Chris Hankinson	Toulouse Olympique	142
6	(England) Stefan Ratchford	Warrington Wolves	138
7	(Australia) Bevan French	Wigan Warriors	124
8	(England) Sam Tomkins	Catalans Dragons	105
9	(Australia) Ken Sio	Salford Red Devils	104
10	(England) Gareth O'Brien	Castleford Tigers	97

- Updated to games played on 2 September 2022 (Round 27)

== Discipline ==
=== (red card) Red Cards ===
Rank	Player	Club	Red Cards
1	(Australia) Cheyse Blair	Castleford Tigers	1
1	(England) Brad Martin	Castleford Tigers	1
1	(France) Joe Chan	Catalans Dragons	1
1	(France) Jordan Dezaria	Catalans Dragons	1
1	(Wales) Gil Dudson	Catalans Dragons	1
1	(Cook Islands) Dylan Napa	Catalans Dragons	1
1	(England) Will Pryce	Huddersfield Giants	1
1	(England) Jake Connor	Hull FC	1
1	(England) Luke Gale	Hull FC	1
1	(Samoa) Ligi Sao	Hull FC	1
1	(Ireland) James Bentley	Leeds Rhinos	1
1	(Australia) Matt Prior	Leeds Rhinos	1
1	(New Zealand) Zane Tetevano	Leeds Rhinos	1
1	(Australia) Sione Matautia	St Helens	1
1	(England) John Bateman	Wigan Warriors	1
1	(Australia) Kaide Ellis	Wigan Warriors	1
1	(Ireland) Brad Singleton	Wigan Warriors	1

=== (yellow card) Yellow Cards ===
Rank	Player	Club	Yellow Cards
1	(Australia) Mitchell Pearce	Catalans Dragons	4
2	(England) Liam Watts	Castleford Tigers	3
2	(England) Connor Wynne	Hull FC	3
2	(Ireland) James Bentley	Leeds Rhinos	3
2	(England) Jack Welsby	St Helens	3
5	(United States) Bureta Faraimo	Castleford Tigers	2
5	(Tonga) Mahe Fonua	Castleford Tigers	2
5	(England) George Lawler	Castleford Tigers	2
5	(England) Jack Cogger	Huddersfield Giants	2
5	(Australia) Matt Prior	Leeds Rhinos	2
5	(England) Bodene Thompson	Leeds Rhinos	2
5	(England) Ryan Lannon	Salford Red Devils	2
5	(Wales) Morgan Knowles	St Helens	2
5	(Australia) Curtis Sironen	St Helens	2
5	(Australia) David Fifita	Wakefield Trinity	2
5	(England) Joe Bullock	Warrington Wolves	2
5	(Australia) Peter Mata'utia	Warrington Wolves	2

- Updated to matches played on 14 August 2022 (Round 23)

== Attendances ==
=== Club attendances ===
Club	Home Games	Total	Average	Highest	Lowest
Castleford Tigers	13	98,058	7,542	10,500	5,672
Catalans Dragons	13	104,894	8,068	10,260	6,487
Huddersfield Giants	13	66,884	5,144	6,712	3,845
Hull FC	13	140,023	10,771	16,999	8,785
Hull KR	13	101,253	7,788	10,300	7,023
Leeds Rhinos	13	168,232	12,940	15,418	10,655
Salford Red Devils	13	58,888	4,529	6,041	2,607
St Helens	13	154,123	11,701	17,980	8,222
Toulouse Olympique	13	64,579	4,967	9,165	3,326
Wakefield Trinity	13	59,991	4,614	7,046	3,186
Warrington Wolves	13	115,083	8,852	10,476	8,102
Wigan Warriors	13	159,623	12,280	19,210	9,581

- Updated to matches played on 3 September 2022 (Round 27)

=== Top 10 attendances ===
Rank	Home team	Away team	Stadium	Attendance
1	Grand Final		Old Trafford	60,783
2	Magic Weekend: Day 1		St James' Park	36,821
3	Magic Weekend: Day 2		St James' Park	25,333
4	Wigan Warriors	St Helens	DW Stadium	19,210
5	St Helens	Wigan Warriors	Totally Wicked Stadium	17,980
6	Hull FC	Hull KR	MKM Stadium	16,999
7	St Helens	Warrington Wolves	Totally Wicked Stadium	16,118
8	Leeds Rhinos	Castleford Tigers	Headingley	15,418
9	Leeds Rhinos	Salford Red Devils	Headingley	14,668
10	Wigan Warriors	Toulouse Olympique	DW Stadium	14,493

As of 24 September 2022

== Rule changes ==
The Rugby Football League (RFL) approved three rules changes for 2022. On 20 January 2022, The RFL confirmed that scrums will return to all competitions, including the Championship and League 1, having been suspended as part of the game's COVID-19 response in 2020 and 2021. Scrums are only being reintroduced for errors (knock-on, forward pass or accidental offside) in the first four tackles of a set. Other cases, where previously a scrum would have been awarded, for example - ball into touch on the full, ball kicked or passed into touch, incorrect play the ball; will result in a handover.

The ball steal law will revert to the 2020 rule where the ball can only be stolen in a one-on-one tackle and not during a multi-person tackle where the additional tacklers have peeled off the tackle before the steal. Finally, injured players will be required to leave the pitch for treatment, if possible, following complaints that stoppages for injury spoil the speed and flow of the game. On 28 January, the RFL introduced new laws for the 2022 season, including the "green card", whereas if play is stopped due to a player needing attention, they must then either be substituted, leave the field for a concussion test, or wait on the sideline for 2 minutes before returning.

The green card is only shown to a player, if the team doctor enters the field of play, without being invited by the match official.

== End-of-season awards ==
The end of season awards took place on Tuesday 20 September, having originally being scheduled for the previous day but were moved as a mark of respect for the Queen's Funeral, which took place on Monday 19 September.

- Steve Prescott Man of Steel Winner:

Brodie Croft

- Coach of the year winner:

(England) Matt Peet

- Top tackler: Danny Houghton (1,031 Tackles)
- Top Metre-maker: Ash Handley (3,646 Meters)
- Top Try Scorer: Bevan French (31)
- Top Try Assists: Jake Connor (33)
- Top Goal Kicker: Marc Sneyd (97 Goals & 2 Drop Goals)
- Top Points Scorer: Tommy Makinson (230)
- Young player of the year winner: Jack Welsby
- Spirit Of Super League: Peter Mata'utia

== Broadcasting ==
In the first season of a new UK TV rights deal, Sky Sports remained the principal live broadcaster but for a reduced fee and now on a non-exclusive basis; Channel 4 picked up the rights to show eight regular-season and two play-off matches (not the Grand Final) in a deal confirmed in November 2021. This is the first live rights deal signed between Super League and a British free-to-air network. BBC Sport retain highlights rights.

The match on Saturday 12 February 2022 between Leeds Rhinos and Warrington Wolves became the first Super League game to be shown live on British terrestrial television.

Round	Match	Date and time	Broadcast method
1	St Helens v Catalans Dragons	10 February 2022, 20:00	Sky Sports
1	Hull KR v Wigan Warriors	11 February 2022, 20:00	Sky Sports
1	Leeds Rhinos v Warrington Wolves	12 February 2022, 12:30	Channel 4
1	Toulouse Olympique v Huddersfield Giants	12 February 2022, 19:00	Sky Sports
2	Warrington Wolves v Castleford Tigers	17 February 2022, 20:00	Sky Sports
2	Wigan Warriors v Leeds Rhinos	18 February 2022, 20:00	Sky Sports
2	Hull FC v St Helens	19 February 2022, 12:30	Channel 4
3	Leeds Rhinos v Catalans Dragons	24 February 2022, 20:00	Sky Sports
3	Hull KR v Castleford Tigers	25 February 2022, 20:00	Sky Sports
4	Wakefield Trinity v Leeds Rhinos	3 March 2022, 20:00	Sky Sports
4	Warrington Wolves v Catalans Dragons	4 March 2022, 20:00	Sky Sports
5	Leeds Rhinos v Hull FC	10 March 2022, 20:00	Sky Sports
5	St Helens v Warrington Wolves	11 March 2022, 20:00	Sky Sports
5	Huddersfield Giants v Castleford Tigers	12 March 2022, 15:15	Sky Sports
5	Catalans Dragons v Wigan Warriors	12 March 2022, 17:30	Sky Sports
6	Wigan Warriors v Castleford Tigers	17 March 2022, 20:00	Sky Sports
6	Salford Red Devils v Leeds Rhinos	18 March 2022, 20:00	Sky Sports
6	Warrington Wolves v Wakefield Trinity	19 March 2022, 12:30	Channel 4
7	Wigan Warriors v Hull FC	31 March 2022, 20:00	Sky Sports
7	Leeds Rhinos v St Helens	1 April 2022, 20:00	Sky Sports
8	Catalans Dragons v Toulouse Olympique	14 April 2022, 19:30	Sky Sports
8	Hull KR v Hull FC	15 April 2022, 12:30	Sky Sports
8	St Helens v Wigan Warriors	15 April 2022, 15:30	Sky Sports
9 (Easter Monday)	Castleford Tigers v Leeds Rhinos	18 April 2022, 15:00	Sky Sports
9 (Easter Monday)	Hull FC v Warrington Wolves	18 April 2022, 17:30	Sky Sports
10	Castleford Tigers v St Helens	22 April 2022, 19:45	Sky Sports
10	Wigan Warriors v Salford Red Devils	24 April 2022, 13:00	Channel 4
11	Wakefield Trinity v Huddersfield Giants	28 April 2022, 20:00	Sky Sports
11	Warrington Wolves v Wigan Warriors	29 April 2022, 20:00	Sky Sports
12	Huddersfield Giants v Wigan Warriors	12 May 2022, 20:00	Sky Sports
12	St Helens v Hull FC	13 May 2022, 20:00	Sky Sports
12	Catalans Dragons v Warrington Wolves	14 May 2022, 17:00	Sky Sports
13	Warrington Wolves v St Helens	19 May 2022, 20:00	Sky Sports
13	Salford Red Devils v Castleford Tigers	20 May 2022, 20:00	Sky Sports
13	Hull KR v Catalans Dragons	21 May 2022, 12:30	Channel 4
14	Warrington Wolves v Leeds Rhinos	3 June 2022, 20:00	Sky Sports
14	Castleford Tigers v Wigan Warriors	4 June 2022, 14:00	Channel 4
15	Salford Red Devils v Wigan Warriors	10 June 2022, 20:00	Sky Sports
15	Catalans Dragons v Hull FC	11 June 2022, 17:00	Sky Sports
16	St Helens v Leeds Rhinos	23 June 2022, 20:00	Sky Sports
16	Warrington Wolves v Hull FC	24 June 2022, 18:00	Sky Sports
16	Hull KR v Huddersfield Giants	26 June 2022, 15:15	Sky Sports
17	Castleford Tigers v Huddersfield Giants	1 July 2022, 20:00	Sky Sports
17	Catalans Dragons v St Helens	2 July 2022, 17:00	Sky Sports
18 (Magic Weekend)	Wakefield Trinity v Toulouse Olympique	9 July 2022, 14:30	Sky Sports
18 (Magic Weekend)	St Helens v Wigan Warriors	9 July 2022 16:45	Sky Sports
18 (Magic Weekend)	Leeds Rhinos v Castleford Tigers	9 July 2022, 19:00	Sky Sports
18 (Magic Weekend)	Huddersfield Giants v Salford Red Devils	10 July 2022, 13:00	Sky Sports
18 (Magic Weekend)	Catalans Dragons v Warrington Wolves	10 July 2022, 15:15	Sky Sports
18 (Magic Weekend)	Hull KR v Hull FC	10 July 2022, 17:30	Sky Sports
19	St Helens v Huddersfield Giants	15 July 2022, 20:00	Sky Sports
19	Castleford Tigers v Warrington Wolves	16 July 2022, 15:00	Sky Sports
20	Leeds Rhinos v Wigan Warriors	21 July 2022, 20:00	Sky Sports
20	Hull FC v Castleford Tigers	22 July 2022, 20:00	Sky Sports
21	Wigan Warriors v Hull KR	28 July 2022, 20:00	Sky Sports
21	Castleford Tigers v Wakefield Trinity	29 July 2022, 20:00	Sky Sports
22	Wigan Warriors v Warrington Wolves	5 August 2022, 20:00	Sky Sports
22	St Helens v Castleford Tigers	6 August 2022, 13:00	Channel 4
23	Warrington Wolves v Toulouse Olympique	11 August 2022, 20:00	Sky Sports
23	Hull KR v Leeds Rhinos	12 August 2022, 20:00	Sky Sports
23	Salford Red Devils v Huddersfield Giants	13 August 2022, 13:00	Channel 4
24	Huddersfield Giants v Castleford Tigers	18 August 2022, 20:00	Sky Sports
24	Hull FC v Wakefield Trinity	19 August 2022, 13:00	Sky Sports
25	Leeds Rhinos v Huddersfield Giants	24 August 2022, 20:00	Sky Sports
25	Toulouse Olympique v Catalans Dragons	25 August 2022, 19:30	Sky Sports
25	Wigan Warriors v St Helens	26 August 2022, 20:00	Sky Sports
26 (Bank Holiday Weekend)	Castleford Tigers v Salford Red Devils	29 August 2022, 15:30	Sky Sports
26 (Bank Holiday Weekend)	Catalans Dragons v Leeds Rhinos	29 August 2022, 18:00	Sky Sports
27	Wigan Warriors v Catalans Dragons	2 September 2022, 20:00	Sky Sports
27	Leeds Rhinos v Castleford Tigers	3 September 2022, 15:00	Sky Sports
Eliminators	Catalans Dragons v Leeds Rhinos	9 September 2022, 20:00	Sky Sports
Eliminators	Huddersfield Giants v Salford Red Devils	10 September 2022, 13:00	Channel 4 Sky Sports
Semi-finals	Wigan Warriors v Leeds Rhinos	16 September 2022, 20:00	Sky Sports
Semi-finals	St Helens v Salford Red Devils	17 September 2022, 13:00	Channel 4 Sky Sports
Grand Final	St Helens v Leeds Rhinos	24 September 2022, 18:00	Sky Sports; Channel 4 (Delay, Sat 1st Oct 11:30am)
