= 2024 Samoa rugby league tour of England =

- Date: 27 October – 2 November 2024
- Coach(es): Ben Gardiner
- Top point scorer(s): Junior Pauga (15)
- Top try scorer(s): Deine Mariner (2) (3 each)
Summary
P	W	D	L
Total
2	0	0	2
Opponent
P	W	D	L
England
2	0	0	2

The 2024 Samoa rugby league tour of England was a two-match tour by the Samoa national rugby league team to England in October and November 2024.

== Background ==
=== Organisation ===
The 2024 Samoa tour of England was being discussed between the two nations following the conclusion of the 2021 Rugby League World Cup in addition to the previous year's Tonga tour of England. The tour was all but confirmed on 3 August 2023, when International Rugby League announced their long-awaited international calendar following the cancellation of the 2025 Rugby League World Cup. This initially did not happen with Samoa eventually declining their tour invitation on 9 November, in order to play in the returning Rugby League Pacific Championship (a competition which began in 2019 but never had a second edition due to the COVID-19 pandemic) for the 2024 edition.

On 27 November, Samoa re-engaged talks about the potential test series, and on 13 June 2024 the tour was confirmed, but with only a two-match test series (one short of a traditional tour), with the hope that the reduced schedule would allow Samoa to compete in the 2024 Rugby League Pacific Championships as well.

In December 2024, International Rugby League Chairman Troy Grant revealed that the tour when ahead as a result of the Australian Rugby League Commission provided support to Samoa, with the Rugby League Samoa having reservations on the financial feasibility of the tour.

=== Teams ===
IRL Men's World Rankings
Official rankings ahead of the tour
Rank	Change	Team	Pts %
3	▲1	England	74.00
4	▼1	Samoa	70.00

The tour was Samoa's first tour to a European Rugby League nation, and only the second of a Pacific Island Nation, after Tonga's 2023 tour.

The games were the sixth and seventh meetings of the two sides with England winning all previous encounters except for the most recent – the 2021 World Cup semi-final.

Upon the initial planning of the tour, Samoa were above England in the World Rankings (still 3rd and 4th), but a successful 2023 test series against Tonga for England and an unsuccessful 2023 Pacific Championships for Samoa flipped these rankings.

During the tour, Samoa were based at York Knights's York Community Stadium.

== Venues ==
Wigan	Leeds
Brick Community Stadium	Headingley
Capacity: 25,138	Capacity: 19,700

== Squads ==
=== England ===
A 31 man England train-on squad was announced on 6 September 2024. The final squad was announced on 16 October 2024.

Player	Club
Matty Ashton	(England) Warrington Wolves
John Bateman	(England) Warrington Wolves
Tom Burgess	(Australia) South Sydney Rabbitohs
Daryl Clark	(England) St Helens
Ben Currie	(England) Warrington Wolves
Herbie Farnworth	(Australia) Dolphins
Ethan Havard	(England) Wigan Warriors
Chris Hill	(England) Huddersfield Giants
Morgan Knowles	(England) St Helens
Matty Lees	(England) St Helens
Mikey Lewis	(England) Hull KR
Liam Marshall	(England) Wigan Warriors
Mike McMeeken	(France) Catalans Dragons
Junior Nsemba	(England) Wigan Warriors
Harry Newman	(England) Leeds Rhinos
Kai Pearce-Paul	(Australia) Newcastle Knights
Victor Radley	(Australia) Sydney Roosters
Harry Smith	(England) Wigan Warriors
Morgan Smithies	(Australia) Canberra Raiders
Luke Thompson	(England) Wigan Warriors
Danny Walker	(England) Warrington Wolves
Jack Welsby	(England) St Helens
George Williams (c)	(England) Warrington Wolves
Dom Young	(Australia) Sydney Roosters

=== Samoa ===
The Samoa squad was announced on 9 October 2024.

Player	Club
Anthony Milford	(Australia) Dolphins
Blaize Talagi	(Australia) Parramatta Eels
Deine Mariner	(Australia) Brisbane Broncos
Francis Molo	(Australia) St George Illawarra Dragons
Gordon Chan Kum Tong	(Australia) Manly Sea Eagles
Izack Tago	(Australia) Penrith Panthers
Jake Tago	(Australia) Parramatta Eels
Jarome Luai (c)	(Australia) Wests Tigers
Jazz Tevaga	(Australia) Manly Sea Eagles
Jeral Skelton	(Australia) Wests Tigers
Jeremiah Nanai	(Australia) North Queensland Cowboys
John Asiata	(England) Leigh Leopards
Josiah Pahulu	(Australia) Gold Coast Titans
Junior Pauga	(Australia) Sydney Roosters
Keenan Palasia	(England) Leeds Rhinos
Lazarus Vaalepu	(Australia) Melbourne Storm
Luciano Leilua	(Australia) St George Illawarra Dragons
Paul Roache	New Zealand Warriors
Ricky Leutele	(England) Leigh Leopards
Roger Tuivasa-Sheck	New Zealand Warriors
Shawn Blore	(Australia) Melbourne Storm
Simi Sasagi	(Australia) Canberra Raiders
Terrell May	(Australia) Sydney Roosters

== Matches ==
=== First test ===
The first test had an average television audience of 513,000, peaking at 682,000, equating to 7.2% of the audience share.

27 October 2024
14:30 GMT (UTC±00:00)

England	34 – 18	Samoa
Tries: 6 Farnworth 7', Ashton 15', 58', Williams 20'; Radley 49'; Lewis 71'; Goals: 5 Smith 8', 21', 50', 59', 72' (5/6)	1st: 16–6; 2nd: 18–12; Report (BBC)	Tries: 3 Mariner 33', 53'; Chan Kum Tong 75'; Goals: 3 Pauga 34', 54', 76' (3/3)

Brick Community Stadium, Wigan
Attendance: 15,137
Referee: Liam Moore (England)
Touch judges: Marcus Griffiths (England), Cameron Worsley (England)
Video referee: Jack Smith (England)
Player of the Match: George Williams (England)

Team details
England		Position	Samoa
Name	Number	Position	Number	Name
Jack Welsby	1	FB	1	Roger Tuivasa-Sheck
Dom Young	2	WG	2	Jeral Skelton
Harry Newman	3	CE	3	Izack Tago
Herbie Farnworth	4	CE	4	Junior Pauga
Matty Ashton	5	WG	5	Deine Mariner
George Williams	6	SO/FE	6	Anthony Milford
Harry Smith	7	SH/HB	7	Jarome Luai
Ethan Havard	8	PR	8	Francis Molo
Daryl Clark	9	HK	9	Jazz Tevaga
Matty Lees	10	PF	10	Terrell May
Kai Pearce-Paul	11	SR	11	Shawn Blore
John Bateman	12	SR	12	Jeremiah Nanai
Victor Radley	13	LF/LK	13	John Asiata
Mikey Lewis	14	IN	14	Blaize Talagi
Mike McMeeken	15	IN	15	Luciano Leilua
Morgan Knowles	16	IN	16	Gordon Chan Kum Tong
Tom Burgess	17	IN	17	Lazarus Vaalepu
Ben Currie	18	RES	18	Keenan Palasia
Shaun Wane		Coach		Ben Gardiner

=== Second test ===
The second test match of the series was played at Headingley Stadium as a double header with an England vs Wales women's international test match being played beforehand.

2 November 2024
14:30 GMT (UTC±00:00)

England	34 – 16	Samoa
Tries: 6 Marshall 17'; Williams 28'; Ashton 31'; Farnworth 37', 54'; Welsby 67'; Goals: 5 Smith pen 5', 18', 40', 56', 68' (5/7)	1st: 22–6; 2nd: 12–10; Report (BBC)	Tries: 3 Blore 8'; J. Tago 44'; Nanai 73'; Goals: 2 Pauga 9', 46' (2/3); Sin bin: Pauga (yellow card) 25' to 35'

Headingley, Leeds
Attendance: 16,068
Referee: Chris Kendall (England)
Touch judges: Warren Turley (England), Mark Craven (England)
Video referee: Ben Thaler (England)
Player of the Match: Herbie Farnworth (England)

Team details
England		Position	Samoa
Name	Number	Position	Number	Name
Jack Welsby 67'	1	FB	1	Roger Tuivasa-Sheck
Matty Ashton 31'	2	WG	2	Jeral Skelton
Harry Newman	3	CE	23	Jake Tago 44'
Herbie Farnworth 37', 54'	4	CE	4	Junior Pauga 9', 46' (yellow card) 25' to 35'
Liam Marshall 17'	5	WG	5	Deine Mariner
George Williams 28'	6	SO/FE	6	Blaize Talagi
Harry Smith 5' (pen)', 18', 40', 56', 68'	7	SH/HB	7	Jarome Luai
Ethan Havard (substituted off) 18', (substituted on) 75'	8	PR	8	Francis Molo (substituted off) 27', (substituted on) 68'
Daryl Clark (substituted off) 59'	9	HK	9	Jazz Tevaga (substituted off) 27'
Matty Lees (substituted off) 32', (substituted on) 52'	10	PF	10	Terrell May
John Bateman	11	SR	11	Shawn Blore 8'
Junior Nsemba (substituted off) 65'	12	SR	12	Jeremiah Nanai 73'
Victor Radley (substituted off) 23', (substituted on) 61'	13	LF/LK	13	Luciano Leilua (substituted off) 51', (substituted on) 68'
Mikey Lewis (substituted on) 59'	14	IN	14	Simi Sasagi
Morgan Knowles (substituted on) 23', (substituted off) 75'	15	IN	15	Keenan Palasia (substituted on) 27'
Mike McMeeken (substituted on) 32', (substituted off) 52', (substituted on) 65'	16	IN	16	Gordon Chan Kum Tong (substituted on) 27'
Luke Thompson (substituted on) 18'	17	IN	17	Lazarus Vaalepu (substituted on) 51'
Ben Currie	18	RES	18	Anthony Milford
Shaun Wane		Coach		Ben Gardiner

== Broadcasting ==
Both matches of the tour were broadcast locally live on BBC Sport in the UK. For countries outside the UK and Ireland, the games were streamed on Super League+, with select countries also televising the event.

Region	Broadcaster
United Kingdom	BBC Two
Australia	Fox Sports
New Zealand	Sky Sport
Pacific Islands	Digicel
United States and Caribbean	Fox Sports
Elsewhere	SuperLeague+
