= 2023 Tonga rugby league tour of England =

- Date: 22 October – 4 November 2023
- Coach(es): Kristian Woolf
- Tour captain(s): Addin Fonua-Blake
- Top point scorer(s): Toluta'u Koula (8)
- Top try scorer(s): Toluta'u Koula (2)
Summary
| P | W | D | L |
Total
| 3 | 0 | 0 | 3 |
Opponent
| P | W | D | L |
England
| 3 | 3 | 0 | 0 |

The 2023 Tonga rugby league tour of England was a three-match tour by the Tonga national rugby league team to England in October and November 2023.

== Background ==
IRL Men's World Rankings
Official rankings ahead of the tour
| Rank | Change | Team | Pts % |
| 4 | Steady | England | 80.00 |
| 5 | Steady | Tonga | 56.00 |

The tour was the first by a Pacific island nation to England and the first test match series between the two countries. England and Tonga had only played each other three times previously, twice during the 2006 Federation Shield and during the 2017 Rugby League World Cup Semi Final. All three games were won by England. Tonga however, beat Great Britain during the 2019 Lions tour of New Zealand and Papua New Guinea.

== Venues ==
| St Helens | Huddersfield | Leeds |
|---|---|---|
| Totally Wicked Stadium | Kirklees Stadium | Headingley |
| Capacity: 18,000 | Capacity: 24,121 | Capacity: 19,700 |

== Squads ==
=== England ===
The England squad was announced on 17 October 2023. Morgan Smithies and Josh Thewlis were added on 31 October.

| Player | Club |
|---|---|
| Matty Ashton | (England) Warrington Wolves |
| John Bateman | (Australia) Wests Tigers |
| Tom Burgess | (Australia) South Sydney Rabbitohs |
| Daryl Clark | (England) Warrington Wolves |
| Ben Currie | (England) Warrington Wolves |
| Tyler Dupree | (England) Wigan Warriors |
| Liam Farrell | (England) Wigan Warriors |
| Chris Hill | (England) Huddersfield Giants |
| Tom Johnstone | (France) Catalans Dragons |
| Toby King | (England) Wigan Warriors |
| Morgan Knowles | (England) St Helens |
| Matty Lees | (England) St Helens |
| Mikey Lewis | (England) Hull KR |
| Tommy Makinson | (England) St Helens |
| Mike McMeeken | (France) Catalans Dragons |
| Robbie Mulhern | (England) Leigh Leopards |
| Harry Newman | (England) Leeds Rhinos |
| Victor Radley | (Australia) Sydney Roosters |
| Harry Smith | (England) Wigan Warriors |
| Morgan Smithies | (Australia) Canberra Raiders |
| Josh Thewlis | (England) Warrington Wolves |
| Danny Walker | (England) Warrington Wolves |
| Jack Welsby (Note: George Williams was serving a ban for the first two matches of the tour. Jack Welsby captained the side in these games.) | (England) St Helens |
| Elliott Whitehead | (Australia) Canberra Raiders |
| George Williams (c) | (England) Warrington Wolves |
| Dom Young | (Australia) Newcastle Knights |

=== Tonga ===
Squad announced on 4 October 2023.

| Player | Club |
|---|---|
| Latu Fainu | (Australia) Manly Warringah Sea Eagles |
| Addin Fonua-Blake (c) | New Zealand Warriors |
| Moeaki Fotuaika | (Australia) Gold Coast Titans |
| Tyson Frizell | (Australia) Newcastle Knights |
| Siliva Havili | (Australia) South Sydney Rabbitohs |
| William Hopoate | (England) St Helens |
| Konrad Hurrell | (England) St Helens |
| Eliesa Katoa | (Australia) Melbourne Storm |
| Isaiya Katoa | (Australia) Dolphins |
| Felise Kaufusi | (Australia) Dolphins |
| Keaon Koloamatangi | (Australia) South Sydney Rabbitohs |
| Toluta'u Koula | (Australia) Manly Warringah Sea Eagles |
| Tuimoala Lolohea | (England) Huddersfield Giants |
| Haumole Olakau'atu | (Australia) Manly Warringah Sea Eagles |
| Will Penisini | (Australia) Parramatta Eels |
| Hame Sele | (Australia) South Sydney Rabbitohs |
| Moses Suli | (Australia) St. George Illawarra Dragons |
| Tevita Tatola | (Australia) South Sydney Rabbitohs |
| Dion Teaupa | (Australia) South Sydney Rabbitohs |
| Starford To'a | (Australia) Wests Tigers |
| Daniel Tupou | (Australia) Sydney Roosters |
| Siua Wong | (Australia) Sydney Roosters |

== Matches ==
=== First test ===
22 October 2023
14:30 BST (UTC+01:00)

| England | 22–18 | Tonga |
|---|---|---|
| Tries: King, Lewis, Johnstone (2); Goals: Lewis (1/1), Smith (2/3) | 1st: 12–12; 2nd: 10–6; Report | Tries: To'a, Frizell, Koula; Goals: Katoa (3/4) |

Totally Wicked Stadium, St Helens
Attendance: 12,898
Referee: Liam Moore (England)
Touch judges: Jonnie Roberts (England), Jack Smith (England)
Player of the Match: Mikey Lewis (England)

Team details
| England | | Position | Tonga |
| Name | Number | Position | Number | Name |
|---|---|---|---|---|
| Jack Welsby | 1 | FB | 1 | Will Hopoate |
| Tommy Makinson | 2 | WG | 2 | Starford To'a |
| Harry Newman | 3 | CE | 3 | Will Penisini |
| Toby King | 4 | CE | 4 | Moses Suli |
| Tom Johnstone | 5 | WG | 5 | Toluta'u Koula |
| Mikey Lewis | 6 | SO/FE | 6 | Tui Lolohea |
| Harry Smith | 7 | SH/HB | 7 | Isaiya Katoa |
| Tom Burgess | 8 | PR | 8 | Addin Fonua-Blake |
| Daryl Clark | 9 | HK | 9 | Siliva Havili |
| Mike McMeeken | 10 | PF | 10 | Moeaki Fotuaika |
| John Bateman | 11 | SR | 11 | Tyson Frizell |
| Elliott Whitehead | 12 | SR | 12 | Keaon Koloamatangi |
| Victor Radley | 13 | LF/LK | 13 | Felise Kaufusi |
| Danny Walker | 14 | IN | 14 | Dion Teaupa |
| Morgan Knowles | 15 | IN | 15 | Tevita Tatola |
| Matty Lees | 16 | IN | 16 | Haumole Olakau'atu |
| Chris Hill | 17 | IN | 17 | Hame Sele |
| Liam Farrell | 18 | CS | 18 | Eliesa Katoa |
| Shaun Wane | | Coach | | Kristian Woolf |

=== Second test ===
28 October 2023
14:30 BST (UTC+01:00)

| England | 14–4 | Tonga |
|---|---|---|
| Tries: Ashton (2); Goals: Smith (3/4) | 1st: 12–0; 2nd: 2–4; Report | Tries: Koula |

Kirklees Stadium, Huddersfield
Attendance: 11,210
Referee: Jack Smith (England)
Touch judges: Chris Kendall (England), Rich Thompson (England)

Team details
| England | | Position | Tonga |
| Name | Number | Position | Number | Name |
|---|---|---|---|---|
| Jack Welsby | 1 | FB | 1 | Will Hopoate |
| Matty Ashton | 2 | WG | 2 | Junior Tupou |
| Harry Newman | 3 | CE | 3 | Will Penisini |
| Toby King | 4 | CE | 4 | Moses Suli |
| Tom Johnstone | 5 | WG | 5 | Toluta'u Koula |
| Mikey Lewis | 6 | SO/FE | 6 | Tui Lolohea |
| Harry Smith | 7 | SH/HB | 7 | Isaiya Katoa |
| Tom Burgess | 8 | PR | 8 | Addin Fonua-Blake |
| Daryl Clark | 9 | HK | 9 | Siliva Havili |
| Matty Lees | 10 | PF | 10 | Tevita Tatola |
| John Bateman | 11 | SR | 11 | Tyson Frizell |
| Elliott Whitehead | 12 | SR | 12 | Haumole Olakau'atu |
| Victor Radley | 13 | LF/LK | 13 | Felise Kaufusi |
| Danny Walker | 14 | IN | 14 | Dion Teaupa |
| Liam Farrell | 15 | IN | 15 | Moeaki Fotuaika |
| Chris Hill | 16 | IN | 16 | Keaon Koloamatangi |
| Mike McMeeken | 17 | IN | 17 | Eliesa Katoa |
| Ben Currie | 18 | CS | 18 | Hame Sele |
| Shaun Wane | | Coach | | Kristian Woolf |

=== Third test ===
The third test match of the series was played at Headingley Stadium as a double header with an England vs Wales women's international test match being played before the men's fixture.

4 November 2023
14:30 GMT (UTC±00:00)

| England | 26–4 | Tonga |
|---|---|---|
| Tries: Currie, Ashton, Whitehead, Newman; Goals: Smith (5/5) | 1st: 14–0; 2nd: 12–4; Report | Tries: E. Katoa (68') |

Headingley Stadium, Leeds
Attendance: 15,477
Referee: Chris Kendall (England)
Touch judges: Liam Rush (England), Warren Turley (England)

Team details
| England | | Position | Tonga |
| Name | Number | Position | Number | Name |
|---|---|---|---|---|
| Jack Welsby | 1 | FB | 1 | Will Hopoate |
| Tom Johnstone | 2 | WG | 2 | Will Penisini |
| Harry Newman | 3 | CE | 3 | Konrad Hurrell |
| Ben Currie | 4 | CE | 4 | Moses Suli |
| Matty Ashton | 5 | WG | 5 | Toluta'u Koula |
| George Williams | 6 | SO/FE | 6 | Tuimoala Lolohea |
| Harry Smith | 7 | SH/HB | 7 | Isaiya Katoa |
| Tom Burgess | 8 | PR | 8 | Hame Sele |
| Daryl Clark | 9 | HK | 9 | Siliva Havili |
| Matty Lees | 10 | PF | 10 | Felise Kaufusi |
| John Bateman | 11 | SR | 11 | Tyson Frizell |
| Elliot Whitehead | 12 | SR | 12 | Haumole Olakau’atu |
| Robbie Mulhern | 13 | LF/LK | 13 | Keaon Koloamatangi |
| Danny Walker | 14 | IN | 14 | Latu Fainu |
| Tyler Dupree | 15 | IN | 15 | Moeaki Fotuaika |
| Chris Hill | 16 | IN | 16 | Eliesa Katoa |
| Mike McMeeken | 17 | IN | 17 | Siua Wong |
| Shaun Wane | | Coach | | Kristian Woolf |

== Broadcasting ==
All three matches of the tour were broadcast live on BBC One, except in Wales where the first two matches of the test series were shown on BBC Two Wales.

== See also ==
- International rugby league in 2023
