= Siua =

Siua is a given name. Notable people with the given name include:

- Siua Wong (born 2003), New Zealand rugby league player
- Siua Halanukonuka (born 1986), Tongan rugby union player
- Siua Maile (born 1997), Tongan rugby union player
- Sio Siua Taukeiaho (born 1992), New Zealand rugby league player
