= Lazarus Vaalepu =

Samoa international rugby league footballer

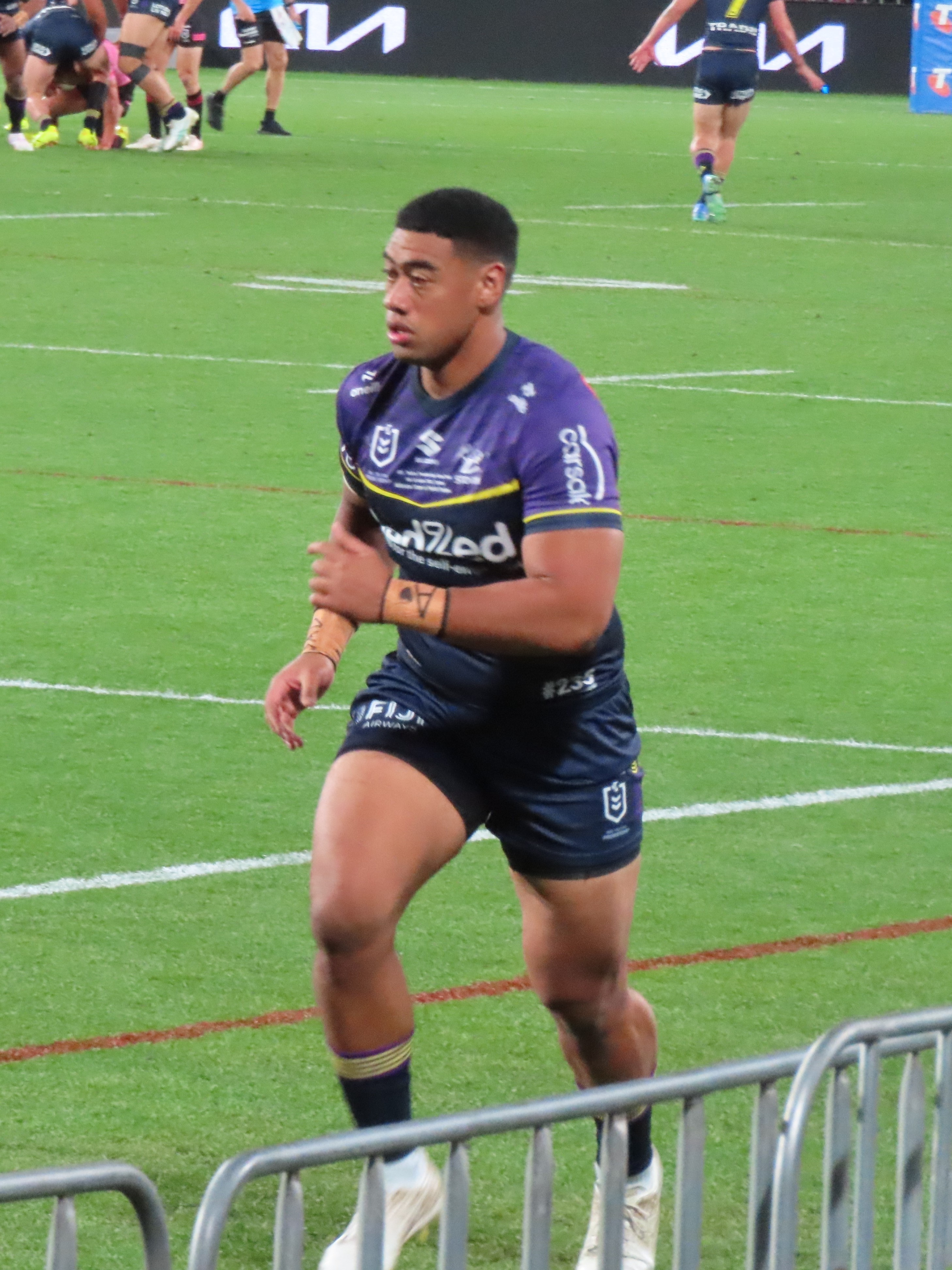

Personal information
- Full name: Lazarus Va'alepu
- Born: 19 March 1999 (age 27) Penrith, New South Wales, Australia
- Height: 6 ft 3 in (1.90 m)
- Weight: 18 st 10 lb (119 kg)

Playing information
- Position: Prop
Club
Years	Team	Pld	T	G	FG	P
2024–26	Melbourne Storm	12	1	0	0	4
2026–	Leigh Leopards	4	0	0	0	0
2026(loan)	→ Oldham RLFC	2	0	0	0	0
2026–	→ Castleford Tigers (loan)	3	1	0	0	4
	Total	21	2	0	0	8
Representative
Years	Team	Pld	T	G	FG	P
2024	Samoa	2	0	0	0	0
- Source: As of 29 August 2026

Lazarus Vaalepu (born 19 March 1999) is a Samoa international rugby league footballer who plays as a prop forward for the Castleford Tigers in the Super League, on loan from the Leigh Leopards.

He has previously played for the Melbourne Storm in the National Rugby League. He has spent time on loan at Oldham RLFC in the RFL Championship.

== Background ==
Born in Penrith, New South Wales, Vaalepu was raised in Canberra and is of Samoan descent. He played rugby union until he turned 12. He played his junior rugby league for the Queanbeyan Kangaroos and attended Erindale College before being signed by the Canberra Raiders.

== Playing career ==
=== Early career ===
In 2015, Vaalepu played for the Canberra Raiders in the Harold Matthews Cup. In 2016 and 2017, he played for the Raiders in the SG Ball Cup.

In 2019, Vaalepu played 19 games for the Raiders' Jersey Flegg Cup side, coming off the bench in their Grand Final loss to the South Sydney Rabbitohs.

In 2020, he played for the Woden Valley Rams in the Canberra Rugby League before joining the Wynnum Manly Seagulls in 2021.

In 2022, he joined the Sunshine Coast Falcons and underwent pre-season training with the Melbourne Storm later that year. In 2023, he signed with the Storm on a two-year contract.

=== 2024 ===
In round 20 of the 2024 NRL season, Vaalepu made his NRL debut for Melbourne against the Sydney Roosters. On 1 October, he was named on the bench in the 2024 NRL Grand Final, replacing the suspended Nelson Asofa-Solomona. In just his seventh NRL match, Vaalepu entered the field during the Grand Final to become the most inexperienced player to play in a Grand Final since 1994.

Following the Grand Final, Vaalepu was selected by Samoa as part of the Samoan tour of England.

=== 2025 ===
Following the grand final and the exit of Nelson Asofa-Solomona, Vaalepu reportedly re-signed with the Storm for a further two years.

=== 2026 ===
On 30 June, the Storm announced that Vaalepu departed the club and signed a deal with the Leigh Leopards in the Super League.

On 6 August 2026 it was reported that he had signed for Oldham RLFC in the RFL Championship, on loan from the Leigh Leopards.

On 18 August, Vaalepu joined Super League side Castleford Tigers on loan for the remainder of the season.
