= Harry Newman (rugby league) =

English professional rugby league footballer (born 2000)

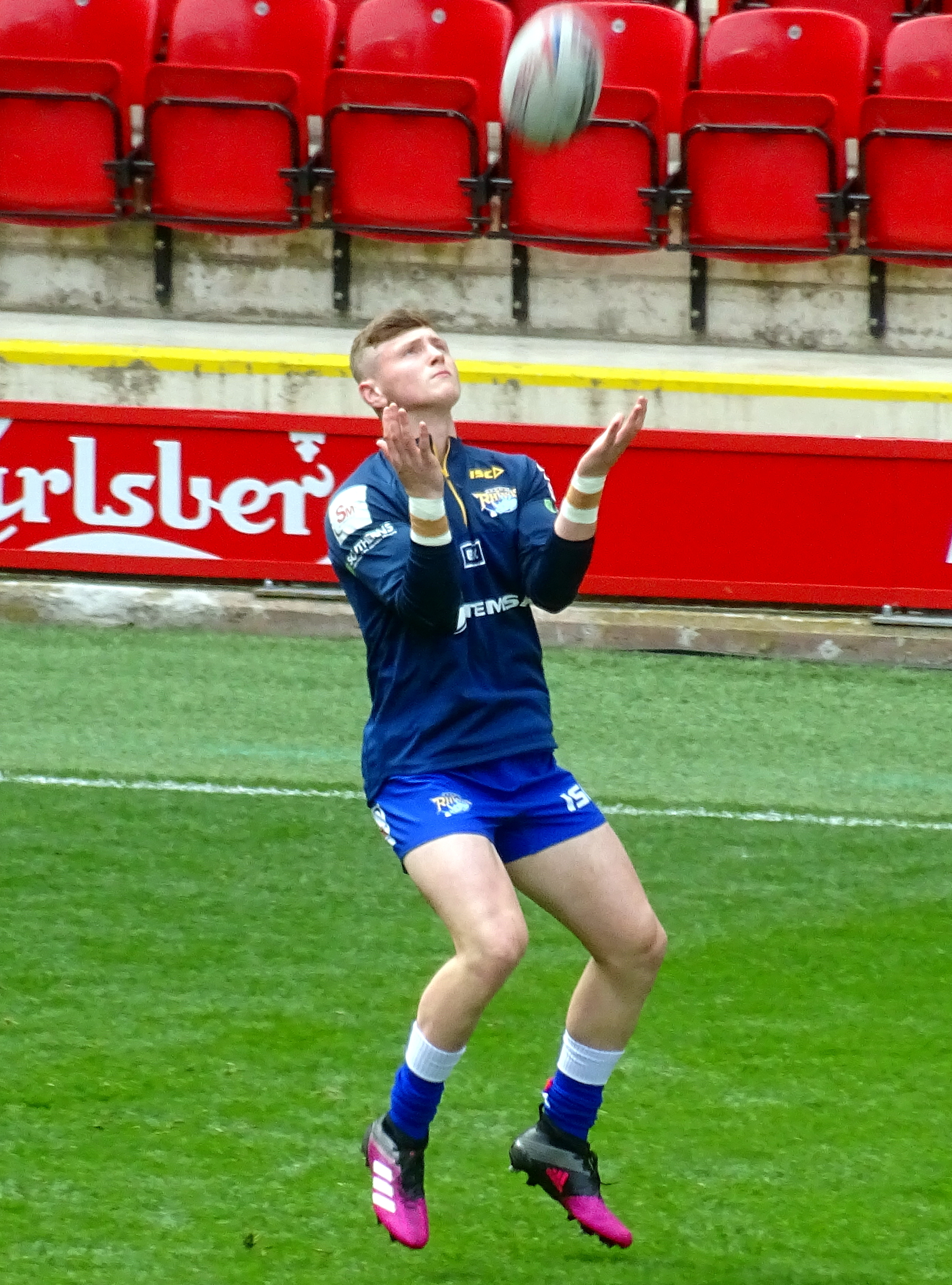

Personal information
- Full name: Harry James Newman
- Born: 19 February 2000 (age 26) Huddersfield, West Yorkshire, England
- Height: 6 ft 0 in (1.84 m)
- Weight: 14 st 9 lb (93 kg)

Playing information
- Position: Centre
Club
Years	Team	Pld	T	G	FG	P
2017–26	Leeds Rhinos	154	56	2	0	228
2018(loan)	→ Featherstone Rovers	12	15	0	0	69
2019(loan)	→ Featherstone Rovers	6	5	0	0	20
2026(loan)	→ Hull FC	3	0	0	0	0
2027–	Perth Bears	0	0	0	0	0
	Total	175	76	2	0	317
Representative
Years	Team	Pld	T	G	FG	P
2018–	England Knights	1	0	0	0	0
2023–	England	7	1	0	0	4
- Source: As of 6 November 2026

Harry Newman (born 19 February 2000) is an English professional rugby league footballer who plays as a centre or winger for the Perth Bears in the NRL. He has played for the England Knights and England at international level.

He has spent time on dual registration from Leeds at Featherstone Rovers in the Championship.

== Background ==
Newman was born in Huddersfield, West Yorkshire, England.

== Career ==
=== Leeds Rhinos ===
In 2017, he made his Super League début for Leeds against the Wigan Warriors.

In 2020, Newman was named the Super League Young Player of the Year. Newman missed out on Leeds' 2020 Challenge Cup victory to Salford Red Devils and the 2022 Grand Final defeat to St Helens due to injury.

In 2022, he made seven appearances for the Leeds club, scoring four tries. In round 12 of the 2023 Super League season, Newman scored two intercept tries for Leeds in their 40-18 victory over Wigan. Newman played a total of 17 games for Leeds in the 2023 Super League season as the club finished 8th on the table and missed the playoffs. Newman played 22 games for Leeds in the 2024 Super League season as the club once again finished 8th on the table. Newman played every game for Leeds in the 2025 Super League season as the club finished fourth on the table. Newman played in Leeds heart breaking 16-14 elimination play off game against St Helens where Leeds conceded two tries in the last five minutes to lose 16-14, the last of which came after the full-time siren. Following the game, cameras showed St Helens player Tristan Sailor approach Newman in order to console Newman, however Newman was seen telling Sailor to "Fuck Off".

On 2 December 2025, Newman signed a contract to join the Perth Bears ahead of the 2027 NRL season.

=== Hull F.C. (loan) ===
After two rounds of the 2026 season having not been selected in Leeds' first team, 14 April 2026, Newman was signed by injury-stricken Hull F.C. on a short-term loan ahead of a fixture against St Helens. Newman's signing was to cover for F.C.'s first team centre Arthur Romano, who suffered an ankle injury in the Good Friday Hull derby fixture against Hull Kingston Rovers on 3 April and was ruled out of the first team for up to three months.

== International career ==
In 2019, Newman was selected for the England Knights against Jamaica at Headingley Rugby Stadium. He made his senior England debut against Tonga in the first test of the 2023 series on 22 October 2023.
