= 2023 World Club Challenge =

Rugby league competition

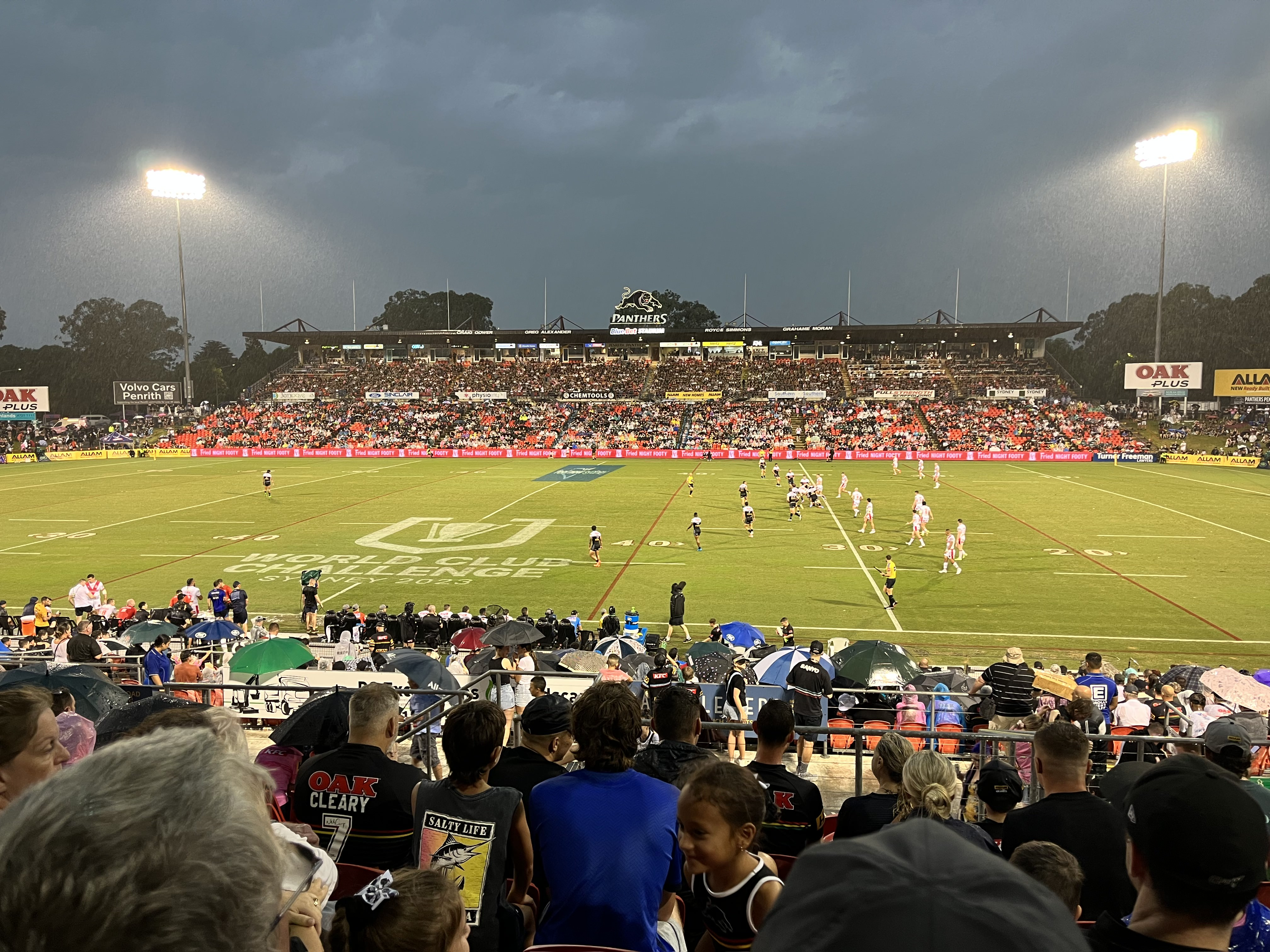
- Penrith Stadium during the match
Penrith Panthers	St Helens
(NRL)	(Super League)
12	13
	1	2	GP1	Total
PEN	0	12	0	12
STH	10	2	1	13
- Date: 18 February 2023
- Stadium: BlueBet Stadium
- Location: Sydney, Australia
- Man of the Match: Jack Welsby (St Helens)
- Referee: Ashley Klein (Australia)
- Attendance: 13,873

Broadcast partners
- Broadcasters: (Australia) Fox League; (New Zealand) Māori Television; (United Kingdom) Sky Sports; (United Kingdom) Channel 4
- Commentators: Andrew Voss; Greg Alexander; Matt Russell (sideline)

The 2023 World Club Challenge (known as the 2023 Betfred World Club Challenge for sponsorship reasons) was the 29th staging of the World Club Challenge. The match was contested by the NRL winners Penrith Panthers, and Super League champions St Helens.

== Background ==
The challenge was played for the first time since 2020 as the global COVID-19 pandemic led to the cancellation of the intervening fixtures.

=== Penrith Panthers ===
Penrith defeated Parramatta Eels in the 2022 NRL Grand Final, which qualified them for the 2023 World Club Challenge.

=== St Helens ===
St Helens and the Leeds Rhinos competed in the 2022 Super League Grand Final, for a record fifth time at Old Trafford, which saw St Helens win 24–12.

== Pre-match ==
=== Team selection ===
Following the departures of Viliame Kikau, Apisai Koroisau, and Charlie Staines to other clubs, Penrith fielded a team with 11 members of their 2022 grand final team. 2022 Clive Churchill Medallist and regular fullback Dylan Edwards missed the match through injury, with Liam Martin and Scott Sorensen also absent through injury concerns.

=== Officiating ===
Australian referee Ashley Klein was selected to referee his third World Club Challenge, having previously been in charge of the 2008 and 2012 fixtures.

== Match ==
=== Summary ===
The match was originally scheduled to kick off at 18:00 AEDT but due to the extreme heat and humidity forecast for that time, the kick off time was put back to 18:50 AEDT. The NRL also announced that the game will be played in four quarters of 20 minutes each, with each team allowed an additional interchange player and two extra interchanges allowed during the match. Despite the forecast, a large storm hit the stadium shortly before kick-off, with torrential rain falling for a lot of the match.

St Helens scored twice early through Jack Welsby and Konrad Hurrell, eventually taking a 10-0 lead to half time.

After an extended half time break due to lightning above the stadium, Penrith finally got on the board in the 52nd minute through Izack Tago, before St Helens added a penalty goal to extend their lead to 12-6.

Saints looked to have won the match with two minutes remaining, but Brian To'o scored a try to bring Penrith to within two points, before Nathan Cleary kicked the conversion, to send the match to extra time.

St Helens eventually won the match 13–12, after a knock on from Penrith gave Saints possession near the halfway line, before Lewis Dodd kicked the winning drop goal.

=== Details ===
18 February 2023
18:50 AEDT (UTC+11)

Penrith Panthers	12–13 (g.p.)	St Helens
Tries: 2 Tago 53'; To'o 79'; Goals: 2 Cleary 54', 80' (2/2)	1st: 0–10; 2nd: 12–2; ET: 0–1; Report	Tries: 2 Welsby 9'; Hurrell 17'; Goals: 2 Makinson 10' (1/2); Percival pen 44' (1/1); Drop goals: 1 Dodd 83'

BlueBet Stadium, Sydney
Attendance: 13,873
Referee: Ashley Klein (Australia)
Touch judges: Darian Furner (Australia), Dave Munro (Australia)
Player of the Match: Jack Welsby (St Helens)

Team details
Penrith Panthers		Position	St Helens
Name	Number	Position	Number	Name
Stephen Crichton	1	Fullback	1	Jack Welsby
Taylan May	2	Wing	2	Tommy Makinson
Izack Tago	3	Centre	23	Konrad Hurrell
Sunia Turuva	4	Centre	4	Mark Percival
Brian To'o	5	Wing	3	Will Hopoate
Jarome Luai	6	Five eighth/Stand off	6	Jonny Lomax
Nathan Cleary (c)	7	Half back/Scrum half	7	Lewis Dodd
Moses Leota	8	Prop forward	8	Alex Walmsley
Mitch Kenny	9	Hooker	9	James Roby (c)
James Fisher-Harris	10	Prop forward	10	Matty Lees
Luke Garner	11	Second row	11	Sione Mata'utia
Zac Hosking	12	Second row	16	Curtis Sironen
Isaah Yeo	13	Lock forward/Loose forward	13	Morgan Knowles
Jack Cogger	14	Interchange	14	Joey Lussick
Matthew Eisenhuth	15	Interchange	15	Louie McCarthy-Scarsbrook
Spencer Leniu	16	Interchange	17	Agnatius Paasi
Jaeman Salmon	17	Interchange	18	Jake Wingfield
Lindsay Smith	18	Interchange	19	James Bell
(Australia) Ivan Cleary		Coach		(England) Paul Wellens
RLP

=== Statistics ===
Statistic	Penrith Panthers	St Helens
Tries	2	2
Conversions	2	1
Penalty goals (attempts)	0 (0)	1 (1)
Field goals (attempts)	0 (0)	1 (3)
Possession
Possession	49%	51%
Total sets	48	47
Completed sets	34	37
Completion rate	70%	78%
Attacking
All runs	203	197
All run metres	1740	1602
Line breaks	1	3
Offloads	5	10
Defending
Kick metres	614	861
40/20	0	0
Tackles	415	409
Missed tackles	29	41
Goal line dropouts	1	2
Try saves	0	0
Discipline
Penalties conceded	3	6
Errors	16	11
Send offs	0	0
Sin bins	0	0
Reference: NRL Match Centre

Penrith Panthers:

- Most runs: 26 – Stephen Crichton
- Most running metres: 214 – Stephen Crichton
- Most line breaks: 1 – Taylan May
- Most tackles: 51 – Zac Hosking
- Most missed tackles: 5 – Mitch Kenny
- Most errors: 3 – Nathan Cleary

St Helens:

- Most runs: 21 –
  - Will Hopoate
  - Alex Walmsley
- Most running metres: 181 – Alex Walmsley
- Most line breaks: 1 –
  - Konrad Hurrell
  - Mark Percival
  - Curtis Sironen
- Most tackles: 50 –
  - James Roby
  - Morgan Knowles
- Most missed tackles: 7 – Morgan Knowles
- Most errors: 3 – Jack Welsby

== Broadcasting ==
The match was broadcast in Australia on subscription television channel Fox League and streamed via Kayo Sports. In the United Kingdom, Channel 4 and Sky Sports showed the match live.
