= Matty Lees =

England international rugby league footballer

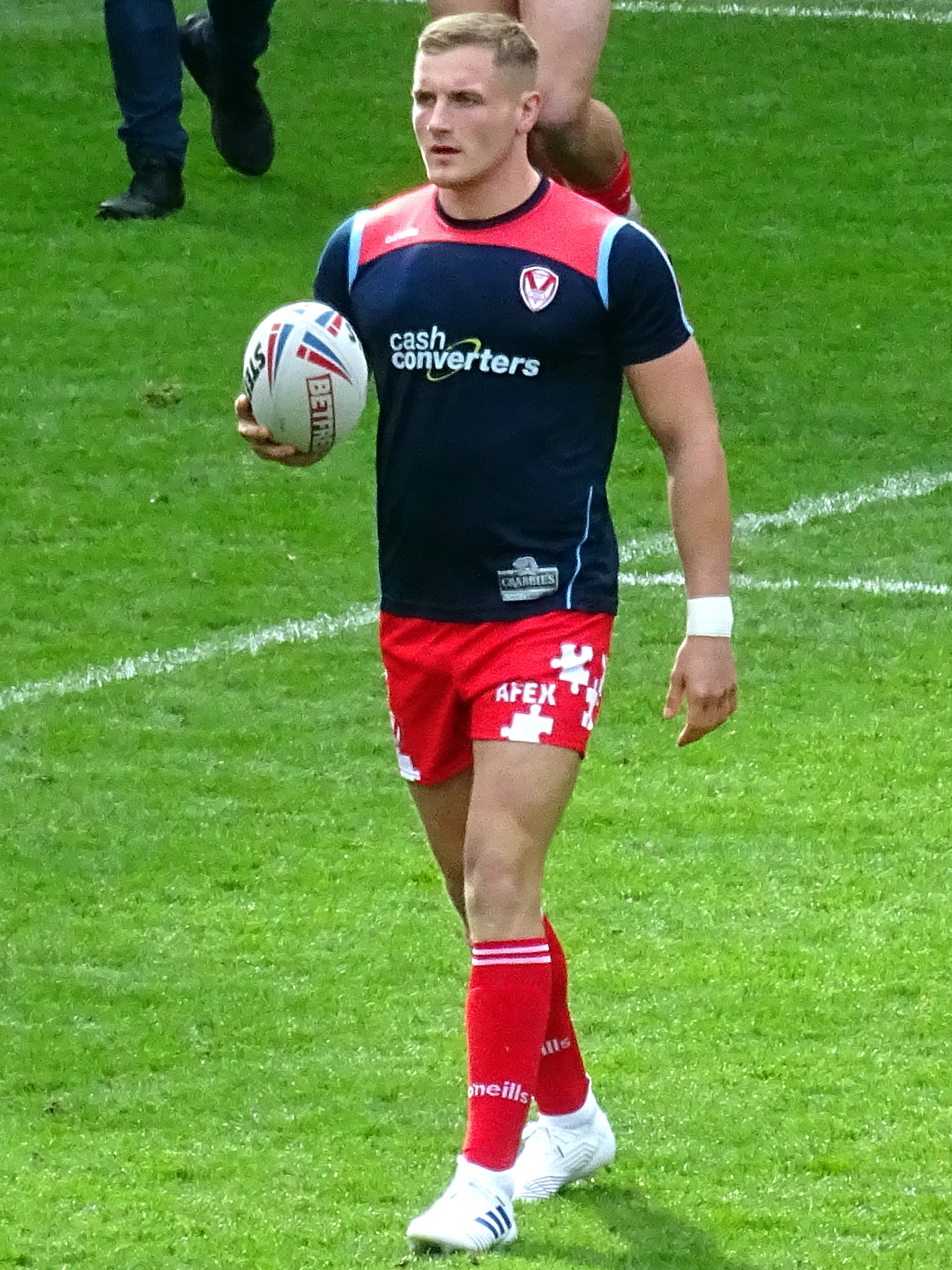

Personal information
- Full name: Matthew Lees
- Born: 4 February 1998 (age 28) Rochdale, Greater Manchester, England
- Height: 6 ft 2 in (1.88 m)
- Weight: 15 st 10 lb (100 kg)

Playing information
- Position: Prop
Club
Years	Team	Pld	T	G	FG	P
2017–	St Helens	199	6	0	0	24
2018(DR)	→ Sheffield Eagles	6	0	0	0	0
	Total	205	6	0	0	24
Representative
Years	Team	Pld	T	G	FG	P
2018–21	England Knights	2	0	0	0	0
2022–25	England	12	1	0	0	4
- Source: As of 6 November 2026

Matty Lees (born 4 February 1998) is an English professional rugby league footballer who plays as a prop for St Helens in the Super League and the England Knights and England at international level.

He has spent time on loan from Saints at the Sheffield Eagles in the Betfred Championship.

== Career ==
Lees was signed by St Helens from amateur club Rochdale Mayfield at the age of 16. He made his Super League and professional début on 7 September 2017 at Belle Vue against Wakefield. Saints won the game 16-18.

In 2018, he played for the Sheffield Eagles on Dual registration. He made 19 appearances for Saints during the 2018 season, and was nominated for the Super League Young Player of the Year award.

Lees signed a new three-year contract prior to the start of the 2019 season. Although his season was cut short after suffering a bowel injury, he received another nomination for the Young Player of the Year, and was this time voted as the winner of the award.

He played for St Helens in their 8-4 2020 Super League Grand Final victory over Wigan at the Kingston Communications Stadium in Hull.

On 17 July 2021, Lees played for St. Helens in their 26-12 2021 Challenge Cup Final victory over Castleford. On 9 October 2021, Lees played for St. Helens in their 12-10 2021 Super League Grand Final victory over Catalans Dragons.

On 24 September 2022, Lees scored the fastest try in Super League Grand Final history after crossing over in the second minute of play during St Helens 24-12 victory over Leeds in the decider.

On 18 February 2023, Lees played in St Helens 13-12 upset victory over Penrith in the 2023 World Club Challenge. Lees played 26 games for St Helens in the 2023 Super League season as the club finished third on the table. Lees played in St Helens narrow loss against the Catalans Dragons in the semi-final which stopped them reaching a fifth successive grand final.

Lees played 25 matches for St Helens in the 2024 Super League season which saw the club finish sixth on the table. Lees played in St Helens golden point extra-time playoff loss against Warrington.

Lees played 27 games for St Helens in the 2025 Super League season including the clubs 20-12 semi-final loss against Hull Kingston Rovers.

On 1 December 2025 he was announced as the new club captain for 2026

On 2 June 2026, the PNG Chiefs announced the signing of Lees on a two-year contract as part of the inaugural team for the 2028 NRL season.

== International career ==
In July 2018 he was selected in the England Knights Performance squad. Later that year he was selected for the England Knights on their tour of Papua New Guinea. He played against Papua New Guinea at the PNG Football Stadium and the Oil Search National Football Stadium.
