= Siua Wong =

Fiji & Tonga international rugby league footballer

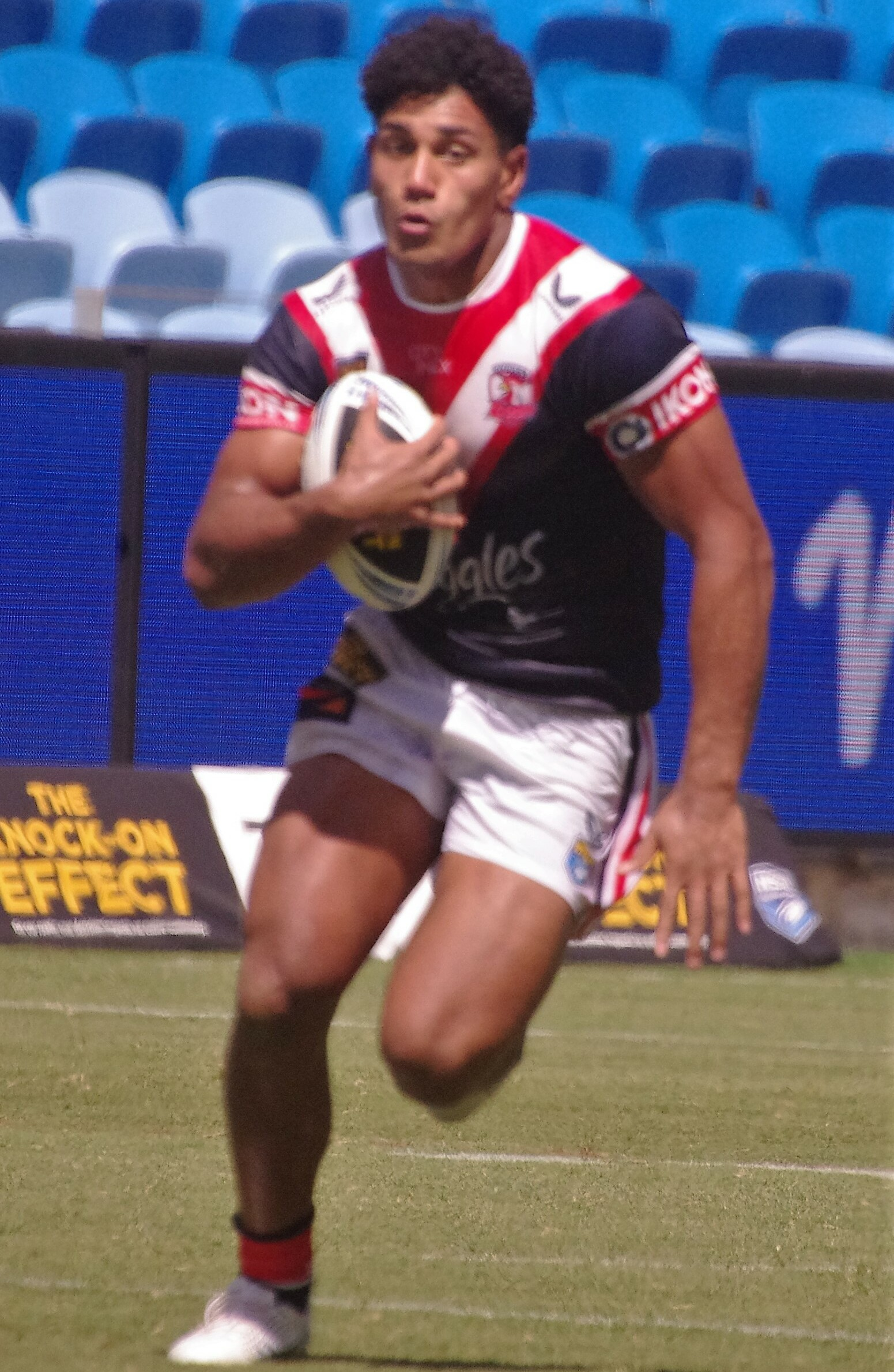

Personal information
- Full name: Joshua Wong
- Born: 4 April 2003 (age 23) Middlemore, New Zealand
- Height: 189 cm (6 ft 2 in)
- Weight: 107 kg (16 st 12 lb)

Playing information
- Position: Second-row
Club
Years	Team	Pld	T	G	FG	P
2023–	Sydney Roosters	67	10	0	0	40
Representative
Years	Team	Pld	T	G	FG	P
2022	Fiji	4	0	0	0	0
2023–	Tonga	9	0	0	0	0
- Source: As of 10 November 2026

Joshua "Siua" Wong (born 4 April 2003) is a rugby league footballer who plays as a second-row forward for the Sydney Roosters in the National Rugby League. He has represented Fiji and Tonga at international level.

== Background ==
He was born in Middlemore, New Zealand. Wong's father was born in Fiji to a Fijian-Chinese father and a Tongan mother, and his mother was born in Tonga to a Samoan father and a Tongan mother.

He attended The Scots College, Sydney and also played rugby union growing up.

== Club career ==
Wong joined the Sydney Roosters as a 14 year old, progressing through the Harold Matthews, SG Ball, Jersey Flegg and NSW Cup sides through to the first team squad.

He was close to making his NRL debut in the 2022 season. He played for the North Sydney Bears in the New South Wales Cup, scoring 3 tries in 10 appearances. In round 18 of the 2023 NRL season, Wong made his first grade debut for the Sydney Roosters against Manly Warringah Sea Eagles.

Wong played 10 matches for the Sydney Roosters in the 2023 NRL season as the club finished 7th on the table and qualified for the finals. Wong played in both of the clubs finals games as they were eliminated in the second week against Melbourne. Wong played nine games for the Sydney Roosters in the 2024 NRL season including their qualifying final loss against Penrith. Wong played 21 games for the Sydney Roosters in the 2025 NRL season as the club finished 8th on the table and qualified for the finals. Wong played in the clubs elimination final loss against Cronulla.

Wong played 27 matches for the Sydney Roosters in the 2026 NRL season including the clubs 2026 NRL Grand Final victory over Newcastle.

== International career ==
In October 2022, Wong was named in the Fiji squad for the 2021 Rugby League World Cup.

In October 2023, Wong was selected by Tonga for their tour of England.

== Statistics ==
Year	Team	Games	Tries	Pts
2023	Sydney Roosters	10	3	12
2024	Sydney Roosters	9		
2025	Sydney Roosters	21	3	12
2026	Sydney Roosters	26	4	16
2027	Sydney Roosters			
	Totals	67	10	40
