= Harry Smith (rugby league) =

England international rugby league footballer

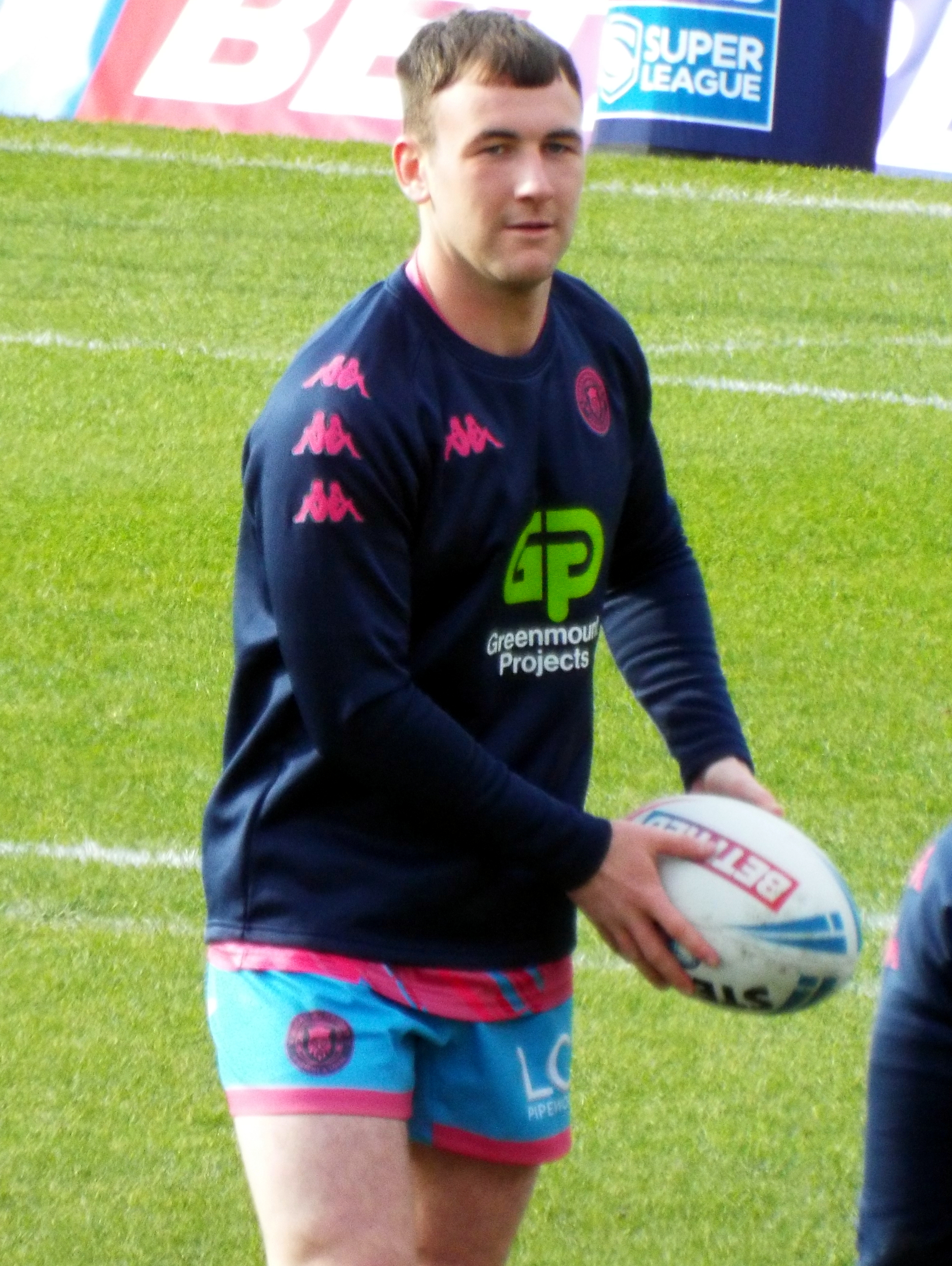

Personal information
- Full name: Harry Smith
- Born: 25 January 2000 (age 26) Widnes, Cheshire, England
- Height: 5 ft 8 in (1.73 m)
- Weight: 12 st 13 lb (82 kg)

Playing information
- Position: Scrum-half, Stand-off
Club
Years	Team	Pld	T	G	FG	P
2019–	Wigan Warriors	188	31	346	9	825
2019(loan)	→ Swinton Lions	16	3	23	0	58
2019(loan)	→ London Skolars	1	0	1	0	2
	Total	205	34	370	9	885
Representative
Years	Team	Pld	T	G	FG	P
2019	England Knights	1	0	0	0	0
2023–	England	12	2	39	0	86
- Source: As of 20 November 2026

Harry Smith (born 25 January 2000) is an English professional rugby league footballer who plays as a scrum-half and stand-off for the Wigan Warriors in the Super League and both England and the England Knights at international level.

He has spent time on loan from Wigan at the Swinton Lions in the RFL Championship, and the London Skolars in RFL League 1.

== Background ==
Smith was born in Widnes, Cheshire, England.

== Career ==
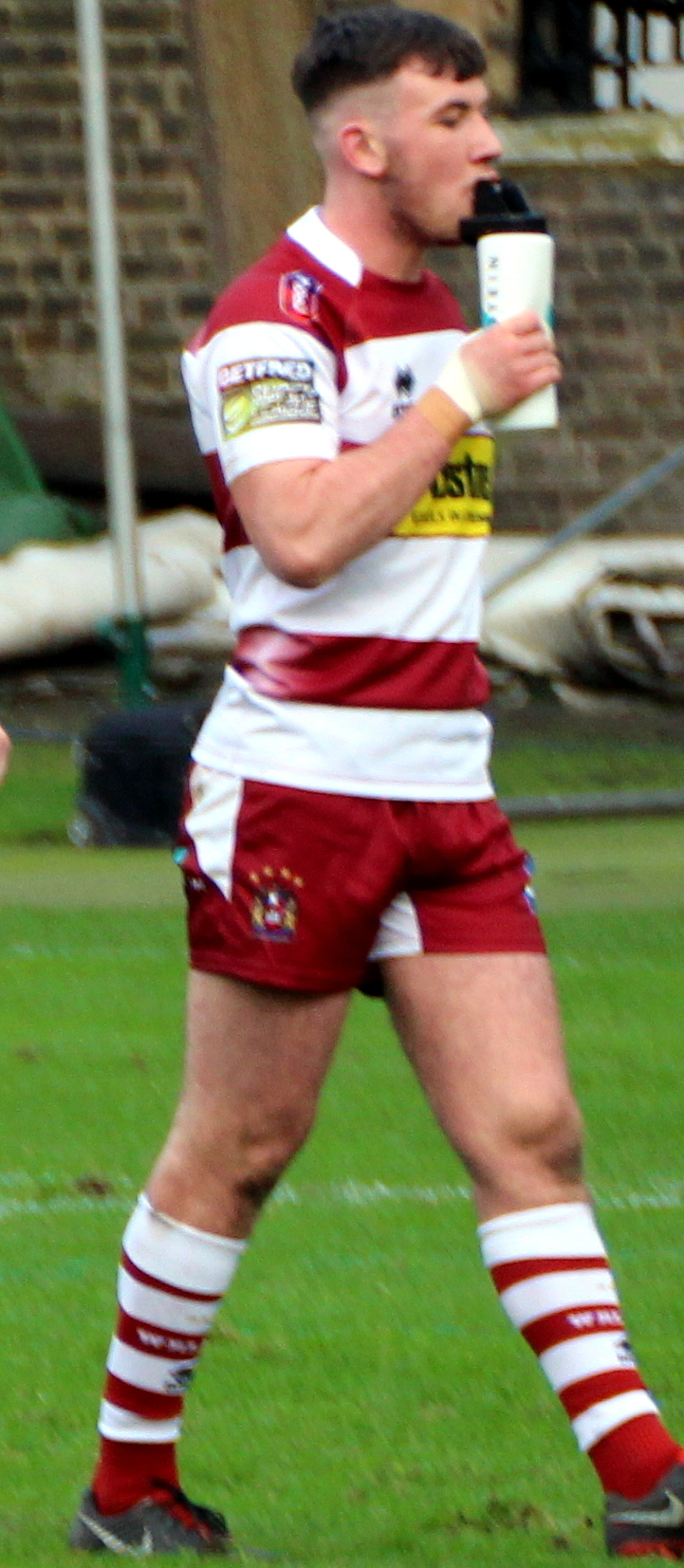
Smith playing for Wigan in 2018

Smith spent the majority of the 2019 on loan to Championship side Swinton Lions, and League 1 side London Skolars. He made his début for Wigan Warriors in September 2019 against the Catalans Dragons, scoring his first try for the club in a 46–12 victory.

Smith scored his first try of the 2020 season in the later expunged victory over Toronto Wolfpack. During the 2020 season, Smith became a regular squad player and won his first piece of silverware with the club – the League Leaders' Shield.

The 2021 season saw Smith take over goal kicking duties from Zak Hardaker as he became a regular starter for Wigan. However, mixed accuracy saw Hardaker reclaim kicking duties towards the end of the season.

In March 2022, Smith kicked the winning drop goals in their victories over Toulouse Olympique, winning 29–28, and Hull F.C., winning 19–18. Smith reestablish himself as the club's primary goal kicker in April, in July he scored a try and kicked eight goals in Wigan's 60–0 victory over Hull F.C.

The 2022 Challenge Cup campaign saw Smith awarded man of the match in the semi-final in Wigan's 20–18 derby victory over St Helens at Elland Road. In the final, Smith scored a first half try and set up the match winning try towards the end of the match which saw a 16–14 victory over Huddersfield and Wigan lift their first Challenge Cup since 2013.

In round 22 of the 2023 Super League season, Smith kicked the winning drop goal for Wigan in golden point extra-time as they won the match 13–12 over Hull F.C. Wigan finished the regular season winning the League Leaders' Shield.

In the playoff semi-final, Smith scored 7/7 conversions in Wigan's 42–12 over Hull KR, and in the Grand Final scored a conversion and two penalties in the 10–2 victory over the Catalans Dragons seeing Wigan win the 2023 Super League. Following the conclusion of the 2023 season, Smith was nominated for the IRL Golden Boot Award. On 24 February 2024, Smith played in Wigan's 2024 World Club Challenge final victory over Penrith. On 8 June 2024, Smith played in Wigan's 2024 Challenge Cup final victory over Warrington. On 12 October 2024, Smith played in Wigan's 9-2 2024 Super League grand final victory over Hull Kingston Rovers.

Smith received praise for his performance in Wigan's 2025 away fixture against Hull KR. On 9 October 2025, Smith played in Wigan's 24-6 2025 Super League Grand Final loss against Hull Kingston Rovers.

On 30 May 2026, Smith played in Wigan's 2026 Challenge Cup final victory against Hull Kingston Rovers. The following month he signed a four-year contract extension, keeping him at the club until 2030.

== International career ==
In 2019 he was selected for the England Knights against Jamaica at Headingley Rugby Stadium.

Smith made his full England début on 29 April 2023 in the 64–0 victory over France at the Halliwell Jones Stadium. Smith scored one try and kicked nine goals in the match. In October and November 2023, Smith played in England's three match test series against Tonga in which England won 3–0. Smith was awarded player of the series, being praised for his kicking game and playmaking, kicking 22 points for England. On June 29, 2024, Smith kicked 4 goals from 8 attempts as England beat France 40- 8, in France

He played in England's first test against Samoa, scoring 5 goals from 6 attempts, in a 34- 12 England victory. He kicked four conversions and a penalty in the 2nd test 34–16 win over Samoa on 2 Nov 2024 at Headingley.

== Honours ==
=== Wigan Warriors ===
- Super League
  - Winner (2): 2023, 2024
- League Leaders' Shield
  - Winner (4): 2020, 2023, 2024, 2026
- Challenge Cup
  - Winner (3): 2022, 2024, 2026
- World Club Challenge
  - Winner (1): 2024

=== Individual ===
- Player of the Series
  - Winner: 2023
- IRL Golden Boot Award
  - Nominee: 2023
