= Morgan Knowles =

England and Wales international rugby league footballer

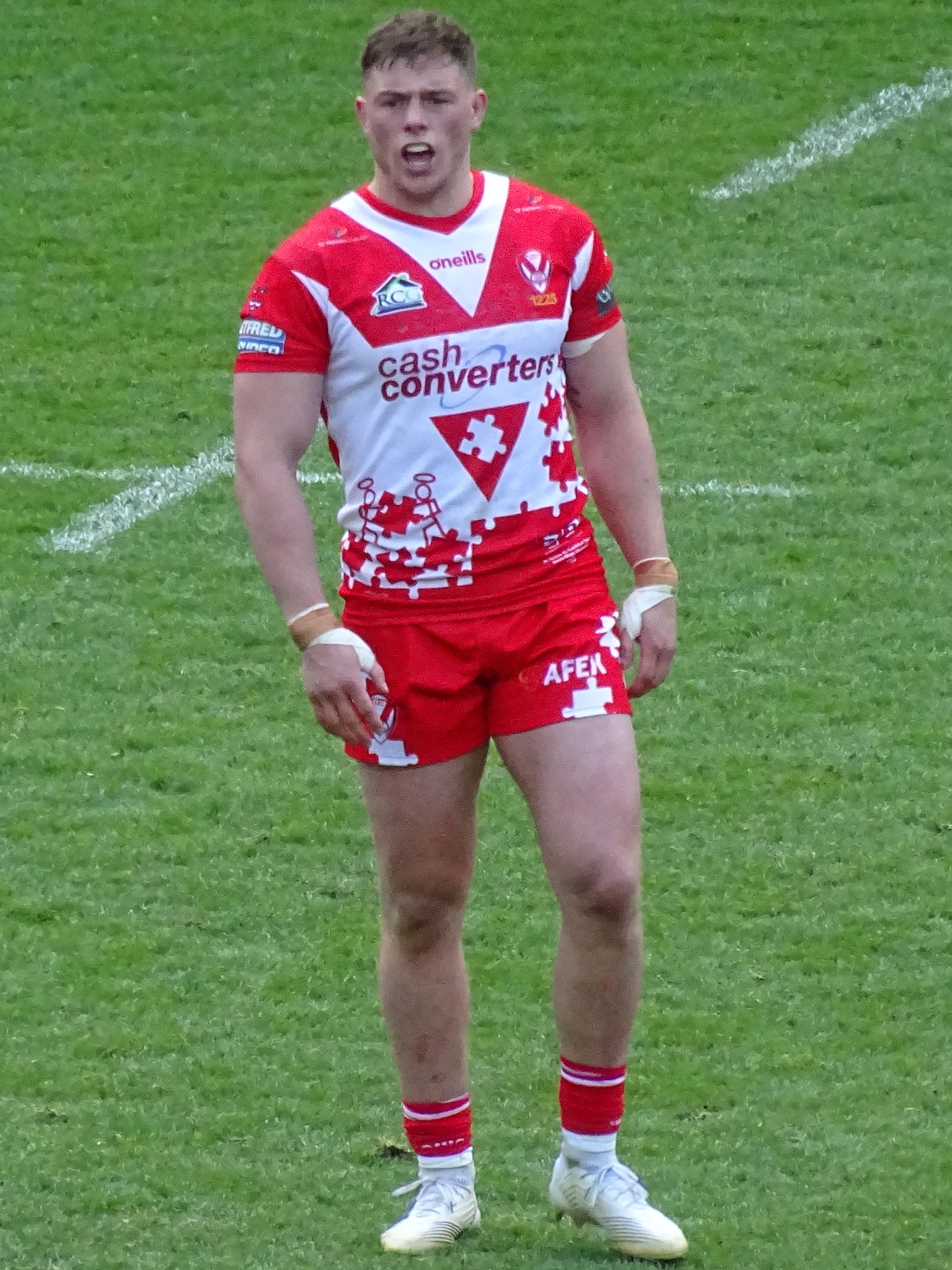

Personal information
- Born: 5 November 1996 (age 30) Barrow-in-Furness, Cumbria, England
- Height: 181 cm (5 ft 11 in)
- Weight: 96 kg (15 st 2 lb)

Playing information
- Position: Lock, Second-row
Club
Years	Team	Pld	T	G	FG	P
2015–25	St Helens	246	38	0	0	152
2026–	Dolphins	25	1	0	0	4
	Total	271	39	0	0	156
Representative
Years	Team	Pld	T	G	FG	P
2015–17	Wales	4	1	0	0	4
2021–26	England	12	1	0	0	4
- Source: As of 6 November 2026

Morgan Knowles (born 5 November 1996) is a British professional rugby league footballer who plays as a lock forward for the Dolphins in the National Rugby League (NRL) in Australia. He previously played for St Helens in the Super League and has represented both Wales and England at international level.

== Background ==
Knowles was born in Barrow-in-Furness, Cumbria, England, and attended Ulverston Victoria High School. He played junior rugby league for Barrow Island before signing for St Helens at the age of 15.

== Career ==
=== St Helens ===
Knowles made his first team debut for Saints in May 2015, appearing as a substitute in a Challenge Cup game against York City Knights. He established a regular place in the first team during the following year, and was rewarded with a new three-year contract at the club.

He played in the 2019 Challenge Cup Final defeat by Warrington at Wembley Stadium. Knowles played in the 2019 Super League Grand Final victory over Salford at Old Trafford.

Knowles played in St Helens 2020 Super League Grand Final victory over Wigan at the Kingston Communications Stadium in Hull. On 17 July 2021, he played for St. Helens in their 26-12 2021 Challenge Cup Final victory over Castleford. On 9 October 2021, he played in St. Helens 2021 Super League Grand Final victory over Catalans Dragons. In the 2022 semi-final, Knowles was sent to the sin bin for a chicken wing tackle during St Helens 19-12 victory over Salford which sent the club into their fourth consecutive grand final. Knowles was later suspended for two matches. St Helens appealed the decision which the RFL rejected. Knowles and St Helens then put in a second appeal which was successful meaning he was free to play in the 2022 Super League Grand Final. On 24 September 2022, Knowles played for St Helens in their 2022 Super League Grand Final victory over Leeds. On 18 February 2023, Knowles played in St Helens 13-12 upset victory over Penrith in the 2023 World Club Challenge. On 12 April 2023, Knowles was suspended for five matches and issued a £500 fine after he was placed on report for an illegal tackle during St Helens 14-6 loss to Wigan in round 8 of the competition. On 22 May 2023, Knowles was suspended for two games following being red carded during the clubs Challenge Cup victory over Halifax. Knowles was sent off in the final minute of the game for a high tackle on Halifax hooker Tom Inman. Knowles played 21 games for St Helens in the 2023 Super League season as the club finished third on the table. Knowles played in St Helens narrow loss against the Catalans Dragons in the semi-final which stopped them reaching a fifth successive grand final. Knowles played 16 matches for St Helens in the 2024 Super League season which saw the club finish sixth on the table. Knowles played in St Helens golden point extra-time playoff loss against Warrington.

=== Dolphins (NRL) ===
On 28 February 2025, it was announced that Knowles would be leaving St Helens at the end of the 2025 season, to join the Dolphins in the NRL for the 2026 season. Knowles played 28 games for St Helens in his final year at the club as they reached the semi-finals before losing to Hull Kingston Rovers. Knowles was also the only St Helens player to be selected in Super League's dream team of 2025. Knowles played 25 matches for the club in the 2026 NRL season including their preliminary final loss to eventual premiers the Sydney Roosters.

=== Representative ===
On 25 June 2021 he made a try scoring début for England in their 24-26 defeat to the Combined Nations All Stars, staged at the Halliwell Jones Stadium, Warrington, as part of England’s 2021 Rugby League World Cup preparation.
