= England national rugby league team =

Team representing England in international rugby league

England

Team information
- Nickname: Wall of White, Three Lions
- Governing body: Rugby Football League
- Region: Europe
- Head coach: Brian McDermott
- Captain: George Williams
- Most caps: James Graham; Ryan Hall (45)
- Top try-scorer: Ryan Hall (39)
- Top point-scorer: Kevin Sinfield (202)
- IRL ranking: 5th

Uniforms
First colours

Team results
- First international
- England 9–3 Other Nationalities (Wigan, Lancashire; 5 April 1904)
- Biggest win
- United States 0–110 England (Orlando, Florida; October 2000)
- Biggest defeat
- Australia 52–4 England (Melbourne, Victoria; 2 November 2008)
- World Cup
- Appearances: 7 (first time in 1975)
- Best result: (silver) Runners-up (1975, 1995, 2017)

The England national rugby league team represents England in international rugby league since the first international match in 1904. It is controlled by the Rugby Football League (RFL), the governing body for rugby league in England, and participated in the Rugby League World Cup and other test matches.

The England national team is the world's oldest national rugby league team, having played the first international rugby league game in 1904 against Other Nationalities, (Note: While the 1904 England vs Other Nationalities team was the first match involving an international rugby league side, the first official international recognised by the International Rugby League was the 1907 match between Wales and New Zealand.) a team initially made up of Welsh and Scottish players.

England have made the Rugby League World Cup final three times, being runners-up; in 1975, 1995 and 2017.

The head coach role is vacant after Shaun Wane resigned in January 2026. George Williams is the captain.

== History ==
=== 1904–1995: Foundations and European Championships ===
For most of its history, England has been represented by the Great Britain national rugby league team in tours and world cups. The only competitive exception to this was the European Championship. England, in its early years, would also play regular friendlies against Wales to ensure the strength of the Great Britain side. The first international rugby league game was played by England in 1904.

At the start of 1903–04 season the Northern Union thought about international matches and scheduled a match for England on New Year's Day 1904 in Oldham. On that day though, the ground was frosty and the match was cancelled and it was rescheduled for April.

On 5 April 1904 England competed against a team called "Other Nationalities", who were made up of ten Welshman and two Scotsman, including George Frater, who captained the side. It was a period of experimentation for the Northern Union and each team had twelve players, not thirteen. At Central Park, Wigan the ground was muddy and in poor condition, however the match went ahead. England steamed into a 3–0 lead, from a try by Warrington's Jackie Fish. This is despite Salford's James Lomas arriving late and causing England to start the match with eleven players. Fish missed the conversion and so the Other Nationalities were able to level the scores a little later, Welshman Thomas crashing over for a try. The conversion was missed and going into half-time the score was tied 3–3. In the second half Thomas went over for another try before Wigan's Harris sealed a 9–3 win for the Other Nationalities in the final minutes of the match. A total of 6,000 spectators turned up for the match, which was considered a poor showing despite a Broughton Rangers v Bradford cup clash being scheduled on the same day.

In 1905 a match between the two sides was played at Bradford. This time England won 26–11 even though they were losing 11–0 at half-time. Wigan's Jim Leytham scored four tries in succession, a record that still stand today. The match was played with fifteen players on each side and so was the 1906 match. Played in Wigan again, the match finished a 3–3 draw. The concept was abandoned after the 1906 match. By 1908 the game had expanded much more into Australia, New Zealand and Wales and England began playing those teams. Harold Wagstaff made his debut for England in 1908 against the touring Kangaroos team at 17 years and 228 days.

The Other Nationalities side did return in 1921. An England side beat the Australasian team of the 1921–22 Kangaroo tour of Great Britain 4–5 at Highbury. England played only one international between 10 May 1956 and 7 November 1968 an 18–6 victory at Headingley Rugby Stadium, Leeds.

=== 1975 "One-off" World Cup ===
England played at the World Cup in 1975 coached by Alex Murphy, which was played over several months in both hemispheres on a league basis. Normally Great Britain would represent England in the World Cup, but the RLIF wanted to capitalise on the large number of Welsh players in the game at the time, and so England and Wales fielded separate teams.

England won their first match, a 20–2 victory over France in Leeds in March. In June the Lions suffered their first defeat in just their second match of the tournament, losing 12–7 against a strong Wales side in Brisbane. A little later England managed to hold on for a draw against Australia in Sydney, the final score being 10–10. And they also picked up a point in Auckland, drawing 17–17 against New Zealand. At the end of October, after the domestic season had finished, England beat the Welsh 22–16 in Warrington and then crossed the English Channel to thrash a French side 48–2 in Bordeaux. Bradford played host the England versus New Zealand match, in which England won comfortably 27–12.

At the start of November, England squeezed past Australia winning 16–13 in November at Wigan. This meant that the Kangaroos had finished on 13 points, with the Lions on 12 points. Australia were deemed champions by finishing top of the table, but because they had not beaten England a final match was quickly arranged. Australia beat England 25–0 at Leeds to clinch their fourth title.

=== 1995–2007: Regular World Cup appearances ===
==== 1995 World Cup ====
With the break up of the Great Britain team into its individual nations, England (as co-host) were in the 1995 World Cup, their first appearance in the World Cup since 1975. England were coached by Phil Larder. The Lions got off to a flying start beating Australia 20–16 in the opening game at Wembley, then hammering Fiji and South Africa in the remaining group games to finish top of group A. This set up a semi-final game at Old Trafford against Wales. England won the tussle 25–10 to reach the World Cup final, but they lost 16–8 to Australia at Wembley Stadium. England would not play again until 2000.

The 1995 World Cup saw the first change of the England strip in a number of years. Instead of the usual all-white kit, an offset red St George's Cross was added to both the front and back of the jumper.

==== 2000 World Cup ====
John Kear was coach of England for the World Cup in 2000. Compared to 1995, England had little success, losing their opening game at Twickenham 22–2 against Australia. But they won their remaining two pool games against Fiji and Russia. A surprisingly competitive display by Ireland in the quarter-finals, saw England scrape through to the semi-finals 26–16. England then went down to a record defeat, losing 49–6 to New Zealand at Bolton, and were knocked out of the tournament.

=== 2007–present: Break up of Great Britain ===
Following the 2007 All Golds Tour, Great Britain splits into separate home nations teams meaning England would represent itself in all international rugby league competitions.

==== 2008–2009: Tony Smith era ====
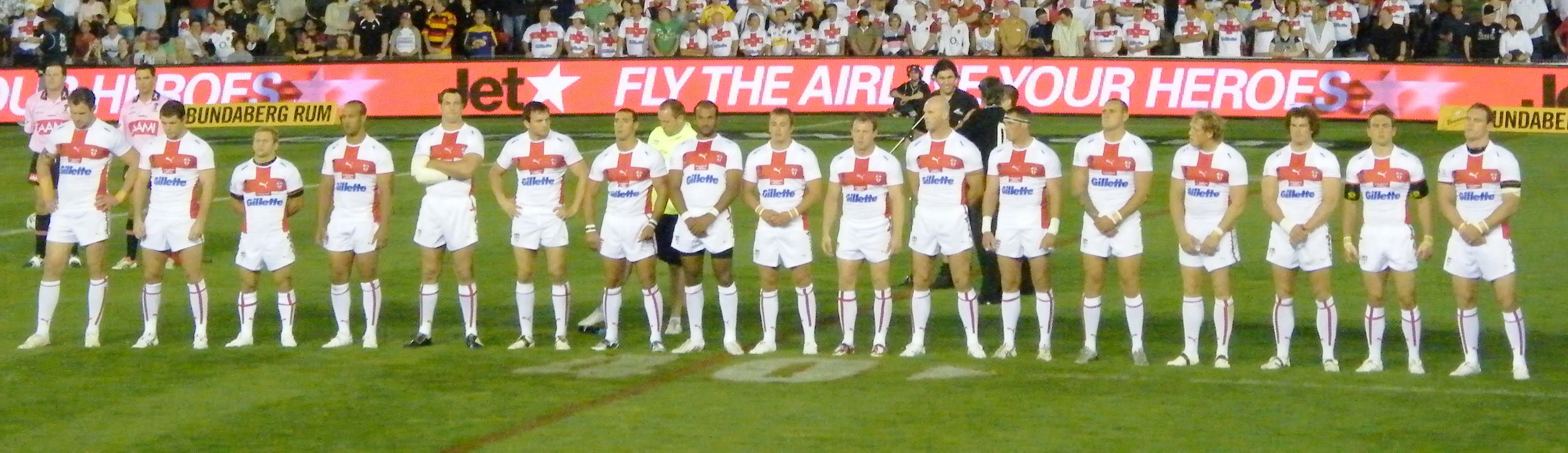
England at the 2008 World Cup

Australian born, Tony Smith, took charge of England in 2008. His first game was against France in Toulouse where the English won 56–8. In his second game, England were missing St Helens and Leeds Rhinos players but the team still created history with a record 74–0 win over Wales in Doncaster. It was England's biggest win recorded over the Welsh since 1978.

It was World Cup year, and Smith announced his ambitions that he wanted England to win their first World Cup, since 1972, when Great Britain represented the country at the event. In the event they were placed in Group A alongside hosts Australia, New Zealand and Papua New Guinea. England faced a scare in their opening game against Papua New Guinea, as Smith's men were trailing 12–16 at halftime, but they did go on to win the game. England were humiliated in their second game against the hosts, suffering their biggest defeat to date, beating their 43-point margin against New Zealand eight years ago. In their final pool game against New Zealand, they produced a much better performance but for only 28 minutes, as they gave up a 24–8 lead to lose 24–36. Before, and during the match, England were accusing New Zealand of being soft, however, after the match, media outlets were calling England the biggest losers of the tournament. Controversy also occurred before the game kicked off, when England refused to face New Zealand's haka challenge. Smith said 'In some cultures poking your tongue out at others could be seen as insulting and the Kiwis pushed things too far by crossing into England's side of halfway.' They took on New Zealand again in the semi-final. This time they never had the lead over the Kiwis, as they lost the match by 10 points. After rumours Smith would be sacked from his position, the RFL announced they'd keep faith in Smith for the remainder of his contract. The World Cup players took the blame for their performances.

After the World Cup nightmare, England began 2009 on a high-note with a record-breaking 54-point away win over France.

Later that year, England were co-hosts of the year's major international tournament, the inaugural Four Nations. After thrashing them earlier in the year, England faced a shock half-time deficit in their opening game against a French side coached by former Great Britain international Bobbie Goulding. But despite trailing at the interval, England scored 30 consecutive points to record another victory over 'Les Tricolores'. In the second match against Australia, England impressively kept Australia scoreless in the second half, and staged a second-half comeback. However it wasn't enough, as Smith's men needed to recover from a 26-point half-time deficit. They then took on New Zealand and, after losing to them twice at last year's World Cup, England earned revenge with an 8-point win over the Kiwis. England then went on to make the final to face Australia. In the final England, at one point, led 16–14 and were credited with how they were able to produce a real contest. However, in the final quarter of the game, Australia dominated proceedings and eventually went on to win 46–16. On 16 November 2009, a few hours after crediting that the England national team had a bright future in rugby league, Smith resigned from the English national side.

==== 2010–2015: Steve McNamara era ====
Following Tony Smiths resignation, former Bradford Bulls head coach Steve McNamara was given the job. His first game in charge of England was against France in Leigh. England thrashed the French to keep their impressive winning run going over their opponents that dates back to 1981. McNamara also fielded the first brothers, Sam and Joel Tomkins, to start on the field for England since Paul and David Hulme represented Great Britain in 1989.

The following year, England co-hosted the 2011 Four Nations with Wales. Their opening game was a win against Wales where Sam Tomkins scored a record-equalling four tries in one game. The win meant England kept their impressive record of not losing on home soil against Wales since 1977. A loss the following week to Australia at Wembley meant that they had to beat New Zealand to make the final, which they did. In the final, England at one point were tied at 8–8, but they would be outclassed again. England were held 'try-less' in the second half as Australia won by 22 points.

In mid-2012, the second International Origin series was held. The Exiles had won the first series in 2011 after Samoan International, George Carmont, scored a try with less than 40 seconds remaining to win the game for the Exiles. England won their first ever International Origin series game, after winning game 1 of the 2012 series, held in St Helens, by 8 points. However the Exiles would win the 2012 series after recording a bigger winning margin in game 2. In October and November that year, England competed in the Autumn Internationals where they took on Wales, and France. In their first game, England racked up their biggest points tally against Wales, as they thrashed 'the Red Dragons' 80–12 in Wrexham. In their second game against France, fullback Sam Tomkins became England's top try scorer when he scored his 14th try for England, breaking the record set by former Wigan and St Helens winger Alf Ellaby in 1935. In the final, England had a rematch with France at Salford City Stadium. England thrashed their opponents to win their first tournament title since the 2004 European Nations Cup.

In the lone 2013 International Origin game, England thrashed their opponents by 20 points. At the end of the year, the 2013 World Cup was held in England and Wales. England, who were now known as the 'Wall of White', featured a new record of three brothers in their squad: Sam and twins George and Tom Burgess. England played their first game against Australia in Cardiff. England got off to a surprising early lead for many, when they were up 10–0 after 20 minutes. England, however, went on to lose in what was one of their best displays against the Kangaroos in years, losing 20–28. They then went on to thrash Ireland to nil in front of a record crowd in Huddersfield, in a game which saw Ryan Hall become the new England top try-scorer after a hat-trick took him to tally 17 total tries for his country. England also beat a determined Fiji, in front a sold-out crowd at the KC Stadium, to advance to the quarter-finals. They took on European rivals, France, in Wigan and, after trailing 0–6 early, England went on to advance to the semi-finals to meet defending World Champions, New Zealand, at Wembley. The game was a see-saw affair, which saw England leading 18–14 with one minute on the clock remaining, until New Zealand play-maker Shaun Johnson produced a historical moment, to level the scores, and then convert his try after the siren, to win the match, and make the Kiwis advance to a third consecutive World Cup final. This was the first time England, or Great Britain, had lost to New Zealand in England since 2005.

In October and November 2014, England travelled down-under to play in the 2014 Four Nations. In the opening game, England took on Samoa in an affair which saw the lead change several times. In the end, England survived a shock result occurring after winning by 6 points. In the second game against Australia, controversy occurred. Australia led 16–12 with one minute left on the clock. England player, Liam Farrell, put a grubber-kick in the in-goal area, which forced Australian fullback, Greg Inglis, to force the ball dead, however, the video referees decided to have a look and see whether or not Inglis or the incoming Ryan Hall got the last touch on the ball. On the slow-motion replays, it showed that Ryan Hall's right hand's little finger had put some downward pressure on the ball, however, in normal speed, it was deemed 'inconclusive' by Australian officiating rules. It was eventually given a no-try to the anger of English players and fans. Ryan complained on Twitter, saying "Looking at the video, I’d say it was a try if we’re playing Super League rules..." Had Hall scored, and England converted, it would have been England's first win over Australia since 1995, the first time Australia suffered back-to-back home defeats since 1970 and the first time Australia did not qualify for a tournament final since the 1954 World Cup final. England lost their final game against New Zealand and, in the process, ended any chance of qualifying for their first Four Nations final in the Southern Hemisphere.

In 2015, England took on New Zealand in a three match series held in England. Before the series, England recorded their biggest ever win over France, beating their previous 73–6 win in 1996. England beat New Zealand 2–1 in the Baskerville Series to retain the trophy that Great Britain last won in 2007. During that series vice-captain, James Graham, reached the milestone of becoming England's most capped player, surpassing Kevin Sinfield's record of 27 test appearances. Despite the series victory, McNamara was facing scrutiny beforehand and the RFL decided not to renew his contract which expired after the series. McNamara therefore left the England national team.

==== 2016–2019: Wayne Bennett era ====
Following McNamara's contract expiration, the RFL appointed Australian Wayne Bennett on a 2-year contract, with a view to win the 2017 World Cup. Bennett's first request as coach was for England to have a pre-season training camp, a mid-season international in 2017, as well as shortening the 2017 Super League season in order to prepare for the 2017 World Cup. RFL Chief Executive Nigel Wood accepted Bennett's first two demands, but said shortening the domestic season is a "big disturbance in lots of ways..." Bennett's plans suffered criticism from some professional club coaches.

Bennett's first match was against France in Perpignan, in preparation for the 2016 Four Nations. Despite trailing, and being held scoreless in the first 26 minutes, England did go on to avoid an upset, convincingly beating the French and giving Bennett a successful return to the International scene, 8 years after he left the New Zealand assistant coach role. However England went onto having a disappointing Four Nations, losing the opening game to New Zealand, facing a scare against Scotland, before going on to lose a 'must-win' game against Australia. This marked the first time that England failed to qualify for a Four Nations final while being hosts.

At the end of 2016, Bennett announced that the England pre-season 'heat training camp' in Dubai would be cancelled after taking in the consideration of domestic coaches' concerns. Instead of a pre-season training camp, Bennett and the English coaching staff chose an Elite Performance Squad of players, based in England, who would be scouted regularly throughout the 2017 season. The squad trained six times throughout the season in England.

England's first game of 2017 was a convincing result over Samoa, although Bennett came under criticism of his selections for the test-match. Former Great Britain captain Garry Schofield, along with other former players, media, and fans were angered by Bennett's decision to include Australian born players Chris McQueen and Chris Heighington, who are eligible to play through their English fathers. Heighington's age was also a talking point. At the age of 35, it was suggested younger players such as Liam Farrell, Alex Walmsley, Mark Percival, and Scott Taylor, should have been selected instead.

Bennett only named one NRL player, Chris Heighnington, in his England team for the World Cup, while Zak Hardaker missed out due to a drugs ban. England's first game of the World Cup was against Australia. Although they were credited throughout the match for the way they were able to defend and prevent the Australians from dominating the game like they have in the past they again failed to beat Australia. Despite the defeat, England continued their way through the tournament with convincing victories over Lebanon, France, finishing second in Group A. They then went on to beat Papua New Guinea convincingly in the quarter finals before reaching the semi-finals where they would take on Tonga who had knocked New Zealand out the week before. England led 20–0, with seven minutes left on the clock, before the Tongans began an unpredictable and nerve-wracking comeback for England. With less than one minute left on the clock, Andrew Fifita lost control of the ball before regathering it and putting it over the try-line, only to realise the referee had already blown his whistle. The referee was criticised for not going to the Video Referee and if awarded would have seen that Tonga won the game and reached their first ever World Cup final. Despite the controversy, England were victorious and had advanced to their first World Cup final in 22 Years. England met Australia again in the final but again failed to beat Australia, for a 13th consecutive time, since their last win in the 1995 World Cup group stage. England lost in the lowest World Cup final score in the history of the tournament. Bennets contract expired at the end of the World Cup and despite not winning the tournament he was rewarded with another 2-year contract.

==== 2020–present: Shaun Wane era ====
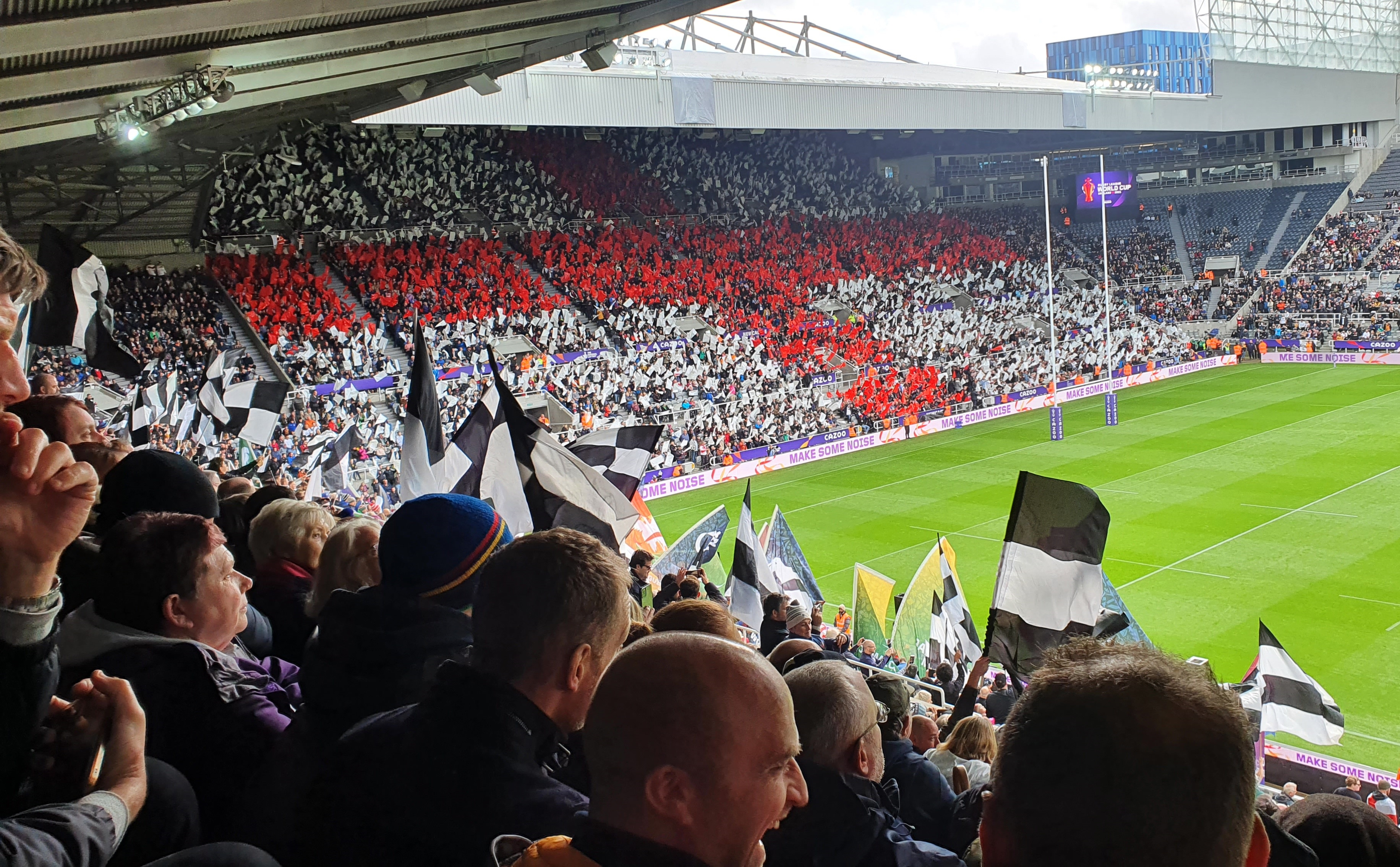
England fans create a St George's Cross ahead of the opening matches of the 2021 Men's Rugby League World Cup at St James' Park

On 3 February 2020, it was announced that Shaun Wane would replace Bennett as Head Coach on a two-year contract with the intention of leading England in the 2020 Ashes series and the 2021 World Cup.

England started the 2021 Rugby League World Cup with a 60–6 victory over Samoa and finished top of their group after winning all three pool matches. England would then defeat Papua New Guinea to reach the semi-final. In the semi-final, England would lose 27–26 against Samoa during golden point extra-time. In October and November 2023, England played in the 2023 Tonga rugby league tour of England. England won the series 3–0. In Autumn 2024, England won a 2–0 Test series victory over Samoa. This marked a significant moment for England following their narrow loss to Samoa in the Rugby League World Cup semi-final the previous year. In the 2025 Ashes Series test against Australia, England would lose 3–0 with England only scoring two tries across the three matches.

== Identity ==
=== Kits and colours ===
England traditionally play in white, their early colours were white with red and gold stripes while later they played in white and red hoops. They occasionally play in a red away kit but colour clashes are rare and they rarely wear an away kit.

In the 1975 World Cup they played in a fully white kit. While they predominately played in white and red blue was also occasionally incorporated into the kit. It wasn't until 1995 when the St George’s cross was first integrated into the kit.

Ahead of the 2021 World Cup a radical New England kit was released which was white with navy blue shoulders and cross.

=== Kit evolution ===
Early Strips		1975 RLWC	1995 RLWC	2000 RLWC	
2008 RLWC	2009–2010	2011–2012		2013 RLWC	
		Home	Away	Home	Away
2014–2016	2017 RLWC	2018–2019	2020–2021	2021 RLWC	2023 Tonga Test Series
24/25 Test Kit	2025 Remembrance	2026 RLWC			

=== Kit suppliers and sponsors ===
Period	Manufacturers	Sponsors
1975	Umbro	
1995–1999	Puma	John Smiths
2000–2007	Patrick	Lincoln Financial Group
2008–2010	Puma	Gillette
2010–2015	ISC	Gillette
2015	BLK	Gillette
2016–2017	BLK	Kingstone Press Cider
2018–2020	Hummel	Dacia
2021	Oxen	Dacia
2022–2026	Oxen	Betfred

- In a test match against France on 22 October 2016, Kingstone Press was replaced by Rugby to the Core due to the Evin law.

=== Badge ===
- The Lions crest

From the 1995 Rugby League World cup, it was used a crest with the Saint George's Cross, the Three Lions Coat of Arms of England and Tudor rose. It was similar to most other English sporting badges, such as the England national football team and the English national cricket team which all promote similar attributes. Until the mid 1990s, England simply used a red lion rampant as crest.

- The Shield Crest

The new official logo was launched on 6 February 2008 on the rugby league magazine programme Boots N' All. The cross of St George is positioned across a three-dimensional shield within the design. The date "1895" is placed through the centre of the cross, symbolising the birth of rugby league. Many people involved in the sport were consulted throughout the design process, which took a little under a year. The logo was first used for the 2008 World Cup and was replaced in 2017.

- Three Lions Cross

As part of a rebrand across all of the RFL in 2017, a new England crest was introduced. It is a merge of both the shield crest and the old lions crest. It has the St. Georges Cross on the background with three lions in front of it.

=== Media coverage ===
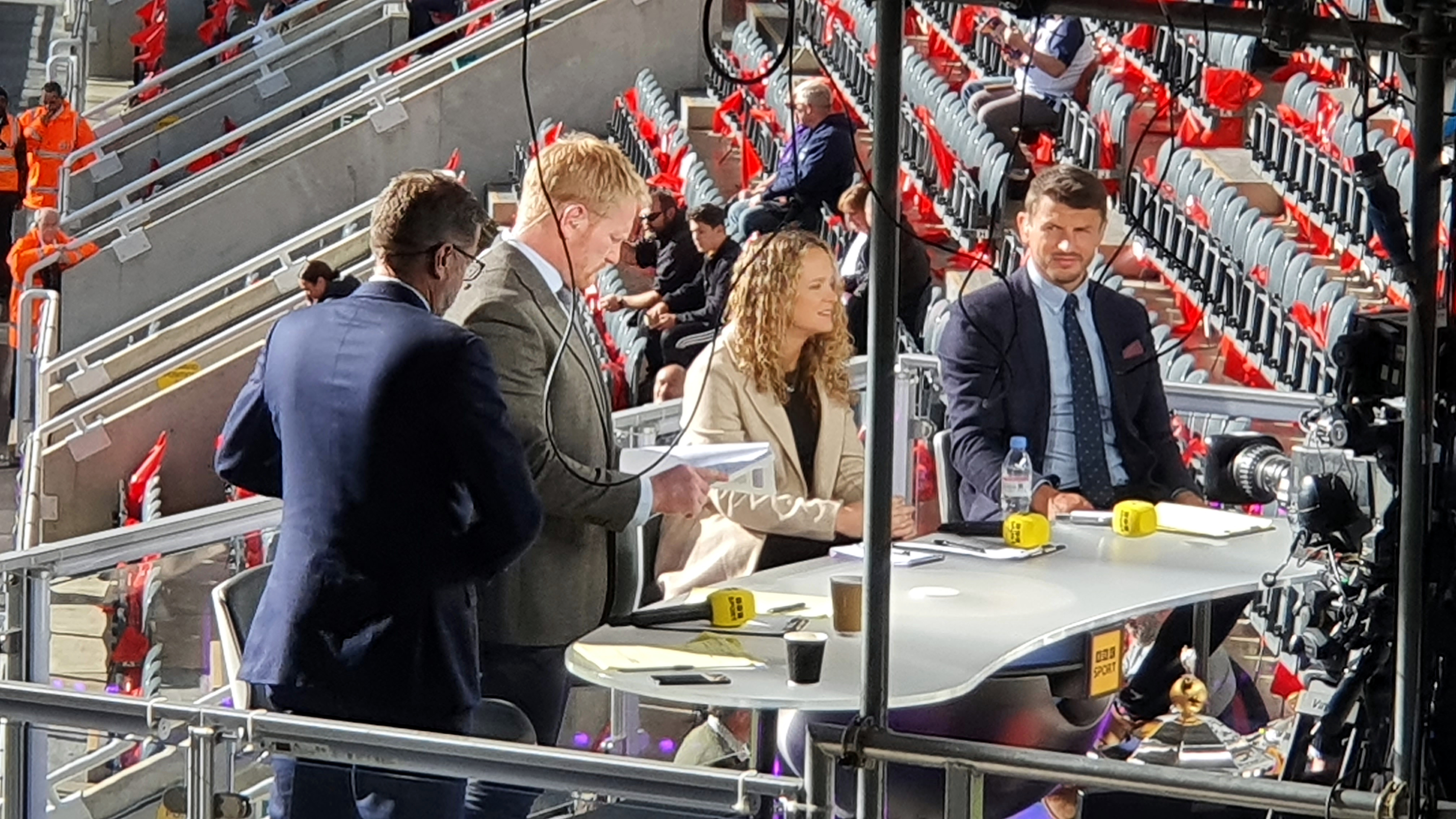
BBC pundits ahead of England's opening match of the 2021 Men's Rugby League World Cup

The BBC have the rights to screen all England games. They showed every game England competed in at the 2017 Rugby League World Cup, as well as all their Four Nations, and Baskerville Shield games. They also showed every game at the 2021 Rugby League World Cup in addition to women's and wheelchair games.

== Coaching staff ==
Head coach	(England) Brian McDermott
Assistant coach	(England) Sean O'Loughlin
Assistant coach	(England) Paul Wellens
Team Manager	TBC
Head of Performance	TBC
Head Physiotherapist	TBC

== Current squad ==
Squad selected for the 2026 Men's Rugby League World Cup.

Player	Caps	Points	Club
Matty Ashton	5	24	(England) Warrington Wolves
AJ Brimson	2	0	(Australia) Gold Coast Titans
Ben Currie	9	12	(England) Warrington Wolves
Zach Eckersley	0	0	(England) Wigan Warriors
Herbie Farnworth	9	24	(Australia) Dolphins
Ethan Havard	3	4	(England) Wigan Warriors
Max King	0	0	(Australia) Canterbury-Bankstown Bulldogs
Morgan Knowles	11	0	(Australia) Dolphins
Mikey Lewis	8	10	(England) Hull KR
Jez Litten	4	0	(England) Hull KR
Junior Nsemba	1	0	(England) Wigan Warriors
Brad O'Neill	1	0	(England) Wigan Warriors
Kai Pearce-Paul	6	8	(Australia) Wests Tigers
Victor Radley	9	8	(Australia) Sydney Roosters
Hugo Savala	0	0	(Australia) Sydney Roosters
Harry Smith	7	76	(England) Wigan Warriors
Ben Talty	0	0	(Australia) Brisbane Broncos
Luke Thompson	9	8	(England) Wigan Warriors
Sam Walters	0	0	(England) Wigan Warriors
Kallum Watkins	31	60	(England) Leeds Rhinos
Jack Welsby	14	16	(England) St Helens
George Williams (Captain)	23	46	(England) Warrington Wolves
Dom Young	8	36	(Australia) Newcastle Knights

== Captains ==
Player	Year	Club	Ref.
Denis Betts	1995	Auckland Warriors	
Andy Farrell	1996–2001	Wigan Warriors	
2002–2007: No set captain, captains appointed on a competition / match basis
Jamie Peacock	2008–2011	Leeds Rhinos	
Kevin Sinfield	2011–2015	Leeds Rhinos	
Sean O'Loughlin	2015–2018	Wigan Warriors	
Sam Tomkins	2021–2023	Catalans Dragons	
George Williams	2023–present	Warrington Wolves	

== Records ==
- **Bold**- denotes player still active at club level

=== Most capped players ===
- As of 5 November 2023

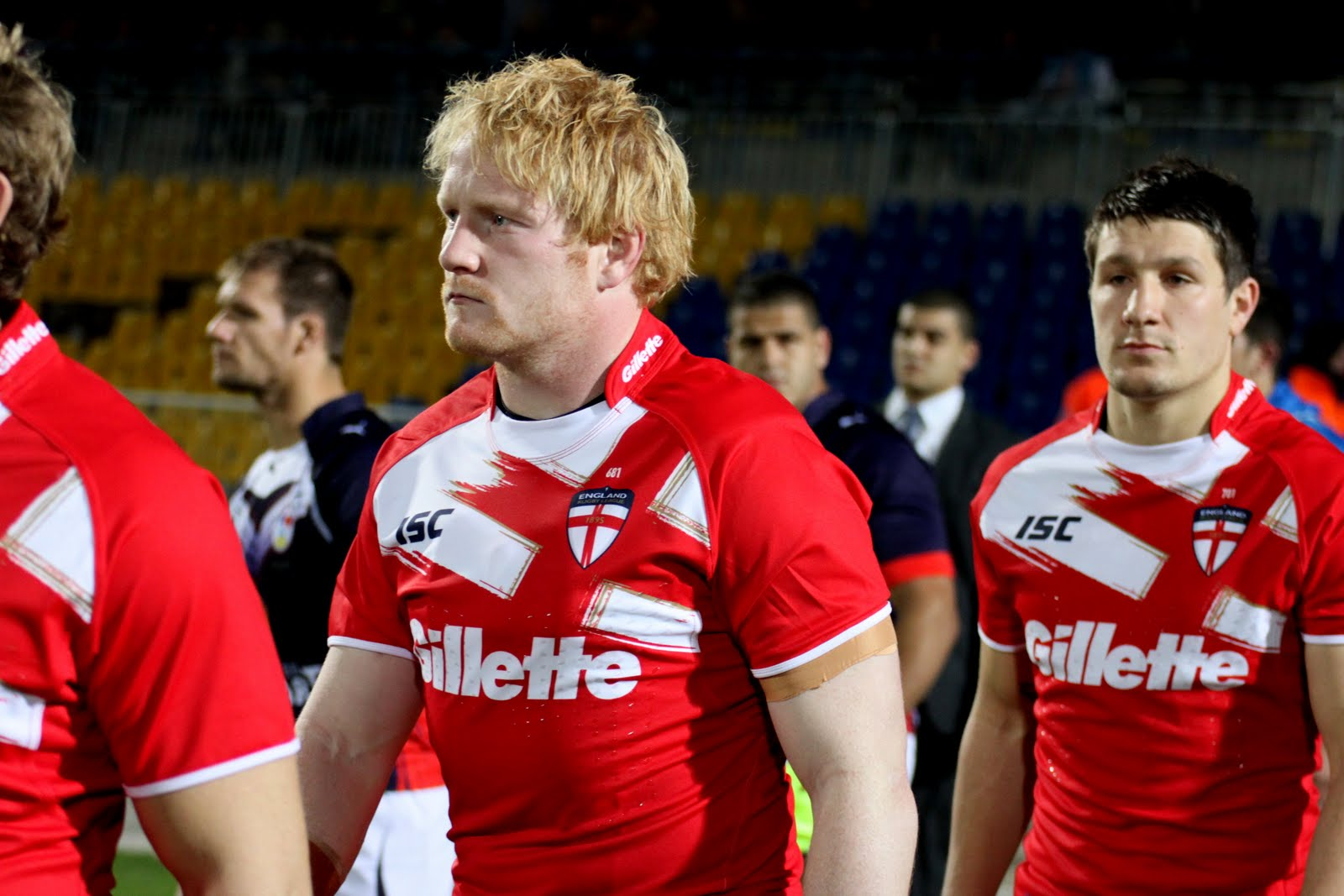
James Graham is England's most capped player

No.	Name	Career	Caps	Tries	Position
1	James Graham	2008–2020	45	3	PR
1	Ryan Hall	2009–2022	45	39	W
2	Chris Hill	2012–2023	38	0	PR
3	James Roby	2008–2022	36	6	HK
4	Sam Tomkins	2009–2022	35	23	FB
5	**Tom Burgess**	2013–	33	7	PR
6	**Kallum Watkins**	2012–	30	16	CE
6	Ben Westwood	2004–2013	29	3	SR
7	Gareth Widdop	2010–2022	29	8	SO
7	Kevin Sinfield	2000–2013	29	5	SO

=== Top try scorers ===
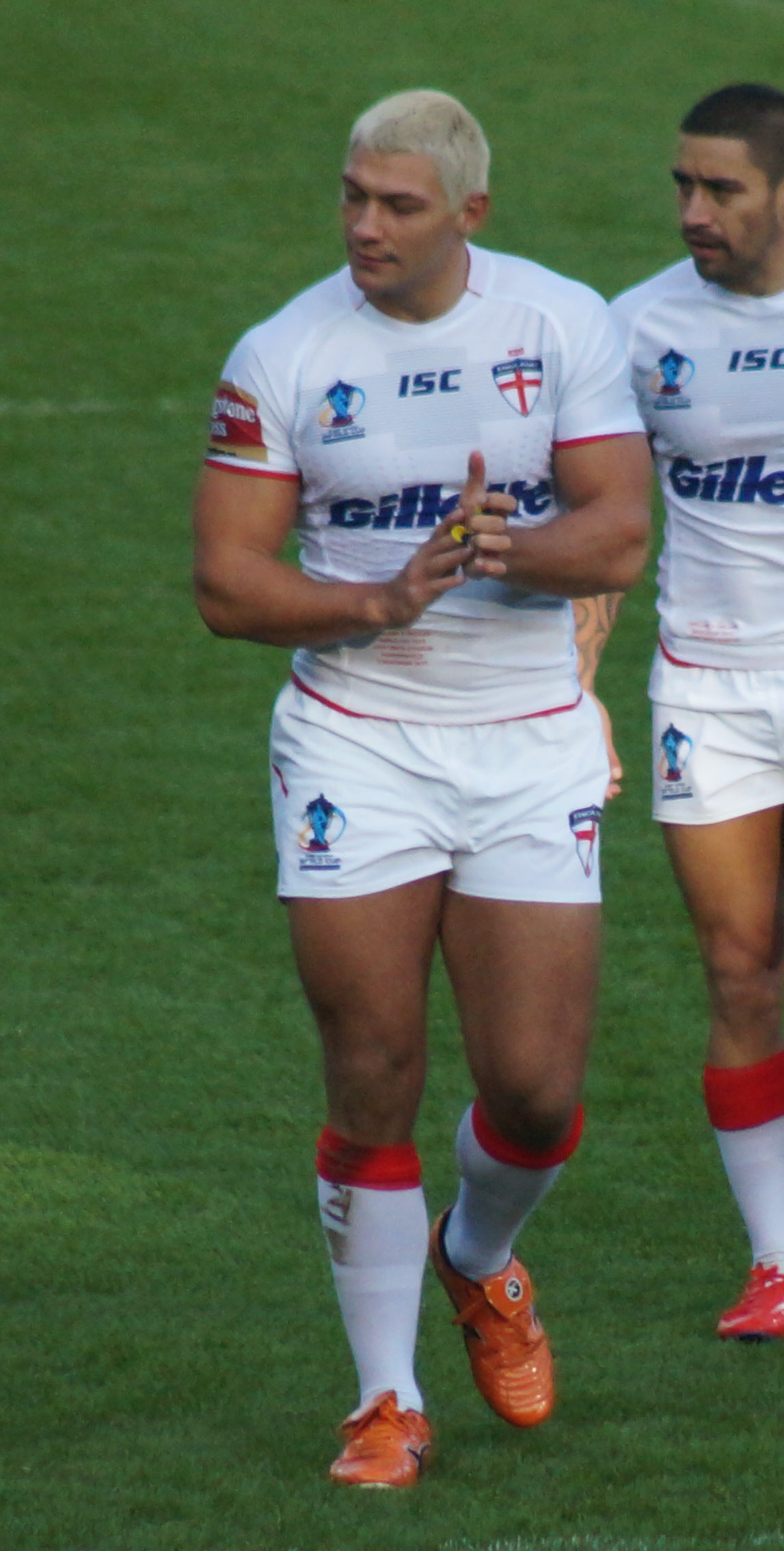
Ryan Hall is England's all-time top try scorer

No.	Name	Career	Tries	Caps	Position
1	Ryan Hall	2009–2022	39	45	W
2	Sam Tomkins	2009–2022	21	33	FB
3	**Kallum Watkins**	2012–	15	28	CE
4	Alf Ellaby	1927–1935	13	8	W
4	Tommy Makinson	2018–2022	13	8	W
6	Jermaine McGillvary	2015–2022	12	17	W
6	Tom Briscoe	2009–2020	12	15	W
8	Billy Dingsdale	1928–1933	11	7	W
8	Mark Calderwood	2004–2008	11	9	W
8	Elliot Whitehead	2014–2022	11	24	SR

=== Top points scorers ===
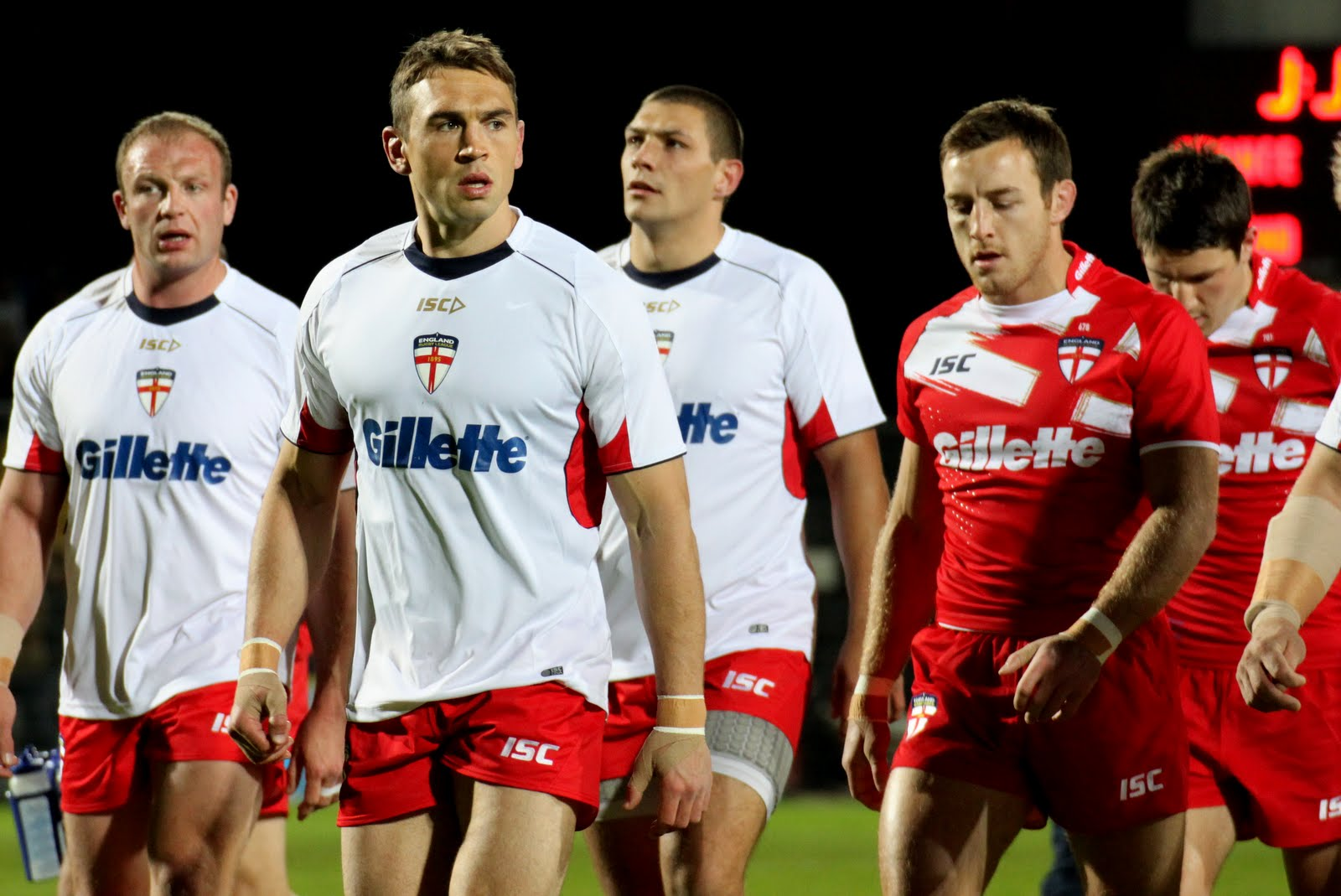
Kevin Sinfield is England's top points scorer

No.	Name	Career	Points	Caps	Position
1	Kevin Sinfield	2000–2013	220	27	SO
2	Gareth Widdop	2010–2022	177	28	SO
3	Ryan Hall	2009–2022	156	45	W
4	George Fairbairn	1975–1981	96	16	FB
5	Sam Tomkins	2009–2022	92	33	FB
6	Tommy Makinson	2018–2022	82	10	W
7	Andy Farrell	1995–2001	78	11	SO
8	**Harry Smith**	2023–	68	6	SH
9	Ernest Ward	1941–1952	61	19	FB
10	Rob Burrow	2004–2013	60	15	SH

=== Team records ===
- Biggest win:

110-0 v. United States (at Orlando, Florida, October 2000)

- Biggest loss:

52-4 v. Australia (at Melbourne Rectangular Stadium, 2 November 2008)

- Highest all-time attendance:

67,545 v. New Zealand (at Wembley, 23 November 2013)

=== Individual ===
- Most tries in a match:

- 5:

Tommy Makinson v. Papua New Guinea (at DW Stadium, 5 November 2022)

- Most goals in a match:

- 15:

Wayne Godwin v. Russia (at Moscow, 25 Oct 2004)

- Most points in a match:

- 34:

Wayne Godwin v. Russia (at Moscow, 25 Oct 2004)

== Competitive record ==
=== Overall record ===
Below is a list of England's head-to-head record as of 17 October 2026.

Key
Positive balance (more Wins)
Neutral balance (Wins = Losses)
Negative balance (more Losses)

Opponent	Matches	Won	Drawn	Lost	Win %	For	Aga	Diff
Aotearoa Māori	1	0	1	0	0%	18	18	0
Australia	28	7	2	19	25%	299	628	–329
Fiji	4	4	0	0	100%	196	22	+174
France	53	44	2	7	83.02%	1,454	540	+914
Greece	1	1	0	0	100%	94	4	+90
Ireland	3	3	0	0	100%	104	28	+76
Italy	1	0	0	1	0%	14	15	−1
Lebanon	1	1	0	0	100%	29	10	+19
New Zealand	20	9	1	10	45%	364	404	–40
Other Nationalities*	22	11	1	10	50%	458	423	+35
Papua New Guinea	5	5	0	0	100%	190	56	+134
Russia	2	2	0	0	100%	174	8	+166
Samoa	7	6	0	1	85.7%	254	111	+143
Scotland	1	1	0	0	100%	38	12	+26
South Africa	1	1	0	0	100%	46	0	+46
Tonga	7	6	0	1	86%	166	106	+60
United States	1	1	0	0	100%	110	0	+110
Wales	68	50	2	16	73.53%	1510	801	+709
Total	224	150	9	65	66.96%	5,410	3,052	+2,358

- Includes results from games against Exiles and Combined Nations All Stars.

=== World Cup ===
England have competed eight times in the World Cup; in 1975, 1995, 2000, 2008, 2013, 2017, 2021 and 2026. They have never won the competition, though finished runners-up to Australia in 1975, 1995 and 2017. In every other year, Great Britain have represented England. Despite having only played in eight world cups, England have hosted matches in nine different tournaments, including three that took part internationally. England have played 40 games in the world cup; winning 24, drawing 2 and losing 14. Of these losses, only three have been against a team other than New Zealand or Australia; Wales in 1975, Samoa in 2021 and Tonga in 2026. England lost out on reaching the final in 2013, when New Zealand beat them 20–18 in the semi-final, after Shaun Johnson scored a conversion in the last 30 seconds of the game to secure the win. England reached the world cup final in 2017, but were beaten by Australia with a score of just 6–0.

As hosts of the 2021 Rugby League World Cup, and as a team who reached the quarter finals in the previous world cup, England automatically qualified. They again reached the semi-final, but lost 27–26, on a golden point after extra time, to Samoa.

World Cup Record
Year	Round	Position	Pld	Win	Draw	Loss	Coach
(France) 1954	Competed as (United Kingdom) Great Britain						none
(Australia) 1957	Competed as (United Kingdom) Great Britain						none
(United Kingdom) 1960	Competed as (United Kingdom) Great Britain						none
(Australia) (New Zealand) 1968	Competed as (United Kingdom) Great Britain						none
(United Kingdom) 1970	Competed as (United Kingdom) Great Britain						none
(France) 1972	Competed as (United Kingdom) Great Britain						none
(Australia) (United Kingdom) (France) (New Zealand) 1975	Final	2nd out of 5	9	5	2	2	Alex Murphy
(Australia) (New Zealand) 1977	Competed as (United Kingdom) Great Britain						none
1985–88	Competed as (United Kingdom) Great Britain						none
1989–92	Competed as (United Kingdom) Great Britain						none
(England) 1995	Final	2nd out of 10	5	4	0	1	Phil Larder
(England) (Ireland) (France) (Scotland) (Wales) 2000	Semi-final	4th out of 16	5	3	0	2	John Kear
(Australia) 2008	Semi-final	3rd out of 10	4	1	0	3	Tony Smith
(England) (Wales) 2013	Semi-final	3rd out of 14	5	3	0	2	Steve McNamara
(Australia) (New Zealand) (Papua New Guinea) 2017	Final	2nd out of 14	6	4	0	2	Wayne Bennett
(England) 2021	Semi-final	3rd out of 16	5	4	0	1	Shaun Wane
2026	Pool stage	5th out of 10	3	2	0	1	Brian McDermott

=== Four Nations ===
England replaced Great Britain in competing in the Rugby League Four Nations which replaced the previous Tri Nations tournament. They have been runners up twice, in 2009 and 2011. These two tournaments were hosted by England.

Four Nations Record
Year	Round	Position	Pld
(England) (France) 2009	Final	2nd out of 4	5
(Australia) (New Zealand) 2010	Group Stage	3rd out of 4	4
(England) (Wales) 2011	Final	2nd out of 4	5
(Australia) (New Zealand) 2014	Group Stage	3rd out of 4	4
(England) 2016	Group Stage	3rd out of 4	4

=== European Championship ===
England have competed in twenty-six European Nations Cups, the first in 1935. In the past the tournament has been axed and revived many times, and it was stopped for six years because of the Second World War. From 1935 to 1949 (minus the war years) England played France and Wales annually, and won the tournament in 1935, 1946, 1947 and 1948. From 1950 to 1956 an Other Nationalities team were added as the fourth team in the competition (except in 1956 when Wales did not field a team). During those years England won in 1950 and 1954. Since then the tournament has run for some seasons, but never for more than five years at a time. But from 1970 to 1996 England won it six out of a possible nine times. In 2003 the tournament was revived and England comfortably won, beating her old rivals plus Scotland, Ireland and Russia. England beat the same opponents to win the cup again in 2004. This was the last time England competed to give the competition more of a level playing field for other teams, however the England Knights competed in 2012.

European Championship Record
Year	Round	Position		Pld			
1935	Single Group Round Robin	1st out of 3		2			
1935–36	Single Group Round Robin	2nd out of 3		2			
1936–37	Single Group Round Robin	2nd out of 3		2			
1938	Single Group Round Robin	3rd out of 3		2			
1938–39	Single Group Round Robin	2nd out of 3		2			
1945–46	Single Group Round Robin	1st out of 3		2			
1946–47	Single Group Round Robin	1st out of 3		2			
1947–48	Single Group Round Robin	1st out of 3		2			
1948–49	Single Group Round Robin	2nd out of 3		2			
1949–50	Single Group Round Robin	1st out of 4		3			
1950–51	Single Group Round Robin	3rd out of 4		3			
1951–52	Single Group Round Robin	2nd out of 4		3			
1952–53	Single Group Round Robin	3rd out of 4		3			
1953–54	Single Group Round Robin	1st out of 4		3			
1955–56	Single Group Round Robin	3rd out of 3		2			
1969–70	Single Group Round Robin	1st out of 3		2			
1975	Single Group Round Robin	1st out of 3		2			
1977	Single Group Round Robin	3rd out of 3		2			
1978	Single Group Round Robin	1st out of 3		2			
1979	Single Group Round Robin	1st out of 3		2			
1980	Single Group Round Robin	1st out of 3		2			
1981	Single Group Round Robin	2nd out of 3		2			
1995	Single Group Round Robin	2nd out of 3		2			
1996	Single Group Round Robin	1st out of 3		2			
2003	Final	1st out of 6		3			
2004	Final	1st out of 6		3			
2005 to 2020	did not compete						
Promotion and relegation era
Year	League	Round	Position	Pld	W	D	L
2023	A	Cancelled		Cancelled			

=== Tour competitions ===
The Ashes (vs Australia)

Year	Result
1908–2003	Competed as Great Britain
(Australia) 2025	0–3
(Australia) 2028	Future Event

Baskerville Shield (vs New Zealand)

Year	Result
(United Kingdom) 2002	Competed as Great Britain
(United Kingdom) 2007	Competed as Great Britain
(England) 2015	2–1
(England) 2018	2–1
(New Zealand) 2019	Competed as Great Britain
(New Zealand) 2027	Future Event

=== Other test series ===
Year	Opponent	Result
(England) 2023	Tonga	3–0
(England) 2024	Samoa	2–0

=== Other tournaments ===
Year	Position	Played	Won	Draw	Lost
(England) 2006 Federation Shield	Winners	3	3	0	0

== Honours ==
=== Major ===
- World Cup
  - (silver) Runners-up (3): 1975, 1995, 2017
  - Semi-finalists (4): 2000, 2008, 2013, 2021
- Four Nations
  - (silver) Runners-up (2): 2009, 2011

=== Regional ===
European Championship

  - (gold) Winners (14): 1935, 1945–46, 1946–47, 1947–48, 1949–50, 1953–54, 1969–70, 1975, 1978, 1979, 1980, 1996, 2003, 2004
  - (silver) Runners-up (7): 1935–36, 1936–37, 1938, 1948–49, 1951–52, 1981, 1995
  - (bronze) Third place (5): 1938–39, 1950–51, 1952–53, 1955–56, 1977

=== Test Series ===
- Baskerville Shield:
  - (gold) Winners (2): 2015, 2018

=== Other ===
- Federation Shield: 2006

== IRL Rankings ==
IRL Men's World Rankings
Official rankings as of August 2026
Rank	Change	Team	Pts %
1	Steady	Australia	100
2	Steady	New Zealand	82
3	Steady	Tonga	70
4	Steady	Samoa	56
5	Steady	England	54
6	Steady	Papua New Guinea	47
7	Steady	Fiji	34
8	▲1	Cook Islands	24
9	▲2	Netherlands	23
10	▲2	Ukraine	21
11	▼3	France	21
12	▼2	Serbia	20
13	Steady	Wales	18
14	Steady	Ireland	17
15	Steady	Greece	14
16	Steady	Malta	14
17	▲12	Canada	13
18	▼1	Italy	11
19	▼1	Jamaica	9
20	▲7	Scotland	8
21	▲1	United States	8
22	▼3	Poland	7
23	▼3	Lebanon	7
24	▼1	Germany	7
25	▼1	Czech Republic	6
26	▼5	Norway	6
27	▼2	Chile	5
28	▲2	Philippines	5
29	▼1	South Africa	4
30	Steady	Brazil	3
31	Steady	Morocco	3
32	▲1	Argentina	3
33	▲2	Ghana	2
34	▲2	Kenya	2
35	▼1	Montenegro	2
36	▲1	Nigeria	2
37	▼5	North Macedonia	1
38	Steady	Albania	1
39	Steady	Turkey	1
40	Steady	Bulgaria	1
41	Steady	Cameroon	0
42	Steady	Japan	0
43	Steady	Spain	0
44	Steady	Colombia	0
45	Steady	Russia	0
46	Steady	El Salvador	0
47	Steady	Bosnia and Herzegovina	0
48	Steady	Hong Kong	0
49	Steady	Solomon Islands	0
50	Steady	Vanuatu	0
51	Steady	Hungary	0
52	Steady	Latvia	0
53	Steady	Denmark	0
54	Steady	Belgium	0
55	Steady	Estonia	0
56	Steady	Sweden	0
57	Steady	Niue	0
Complete rankings at www.internationalrugbyleague.com

== Attendances ==
=== Highest home per nation ===
Date	Opposition	Attendance	Stadium	Competition
23 November 2013	New Zealand	67,545	Wembley Stadium, London	2013 Rugby League World Cup Semi-Final
28 October 1995	Australia	66,540	Old Wembley, London	1995 Rugby League World Cup Final
15 October 2022	Samoa	43,199	St James' Park, Newcastle upon Tyne	2021 Rugby League World Cup Group Stage
21 October 1995	Wales	30,042	Old Trafford, Manchester	1995 Rugby League World Cup Semi-Final
11 October 1995	Fiji	26,263	Central Park, Wigan	1995 Rugby League World Cup Group Stage
2 November 2013	Ireland	24,375	Kirklees Stadium, Huddersfield	2013 Rugby League World Cup Group Stage
22 October 2022	France	23,648	Bolton Stadium, Bolton	2021 Rugby League World Cup Group Stage
5 November 2022	Papua New Guinea	23,179	Wigan Athletic Stadium, Wigan	2021 Rugby League World Cup Quarter-Final
5 November 2016	Scotland	21,009	Coventry Arena, Coventry	2016 Rugby League Four Nations Group Stage
29 October 2022	Greece	18,760	Bramall Lane, Sheffield	2021 Rugby League World Cup Group Stage
4 November 2023	Tonga	15,477	Headingley, Leeds	2023 Tonga tour of England
14 October 1995	South Africa	14,014	Headingley, Leeds	1995 Rugby League World Cup Group Stage
1 November 2000	Russia	5,736	Knowsley Road, St Helens	2000 Rugby League World Cup Group Stage
19 October 2013	Italy	4,382	Salford City Stadium, Salford	Friendly

=== Highest home all-time ===
Competition	Country	Attendance	Stadium	Date
2013 World Cup Semi-Final	New Zealand	67,545	Wembley Stadium, London	23 November 2013
1995 World Cup Final	Australia	66,540	Old Wembley, London	28 October 1995
2025 Ashes	Australia	60,312	Wembley Stadium, London	25 October 2025
2025 Ashes	Australia	52,106	Hill Dickinson Stadium, Liverpool	1 November 2025
2015 Baskerville Shield	New Zealand	44,393	London Stadium, London	7 November 2015
2021 World Cup Group Stage	Samoa	43,199	St James' Park, Newcastle upon Tyne	15 October 2022
2011 Four Nations	Australia	42,344	Wembley Stadium, London	5 November 2011
1995 World Cup Group Stage	Australia	41,271	Old Wembley, London	7 October 1995
2021 World Cup Semi-Final	Samoa	40,489	Emirates Stadium, London	12 November 2022
2016 Four Nations	Australia	35,569	London Stadium, London	13 November 2016
2011 Four Nations Final	Australia	34,174	Elland Road, Leeds	19 November 2011

== England Knights ==
In 2011 the England Knights were created to serve as a step up for the younger players from their club in view of playing for the 1st team. A squad of players were chosen (below the age of 25) to represent the Knights in a few games. Their first ever game was against France and the Knights came out 38–18 victors.

The Knights won the 2012 European Cup by beating Ireland and Scotland in a 3-game tournament.

== See also ==
- Rugby league in England
- England women's national rugby league team
- England national wheelchair rugby league team
- Great Britain national rugby league team
- Rugby Football League
- British Rugby League Hall of Fame
- England national rugby league team match results
- List of England national rugby league team players
