= Jack Welsby =

England international rugby league player

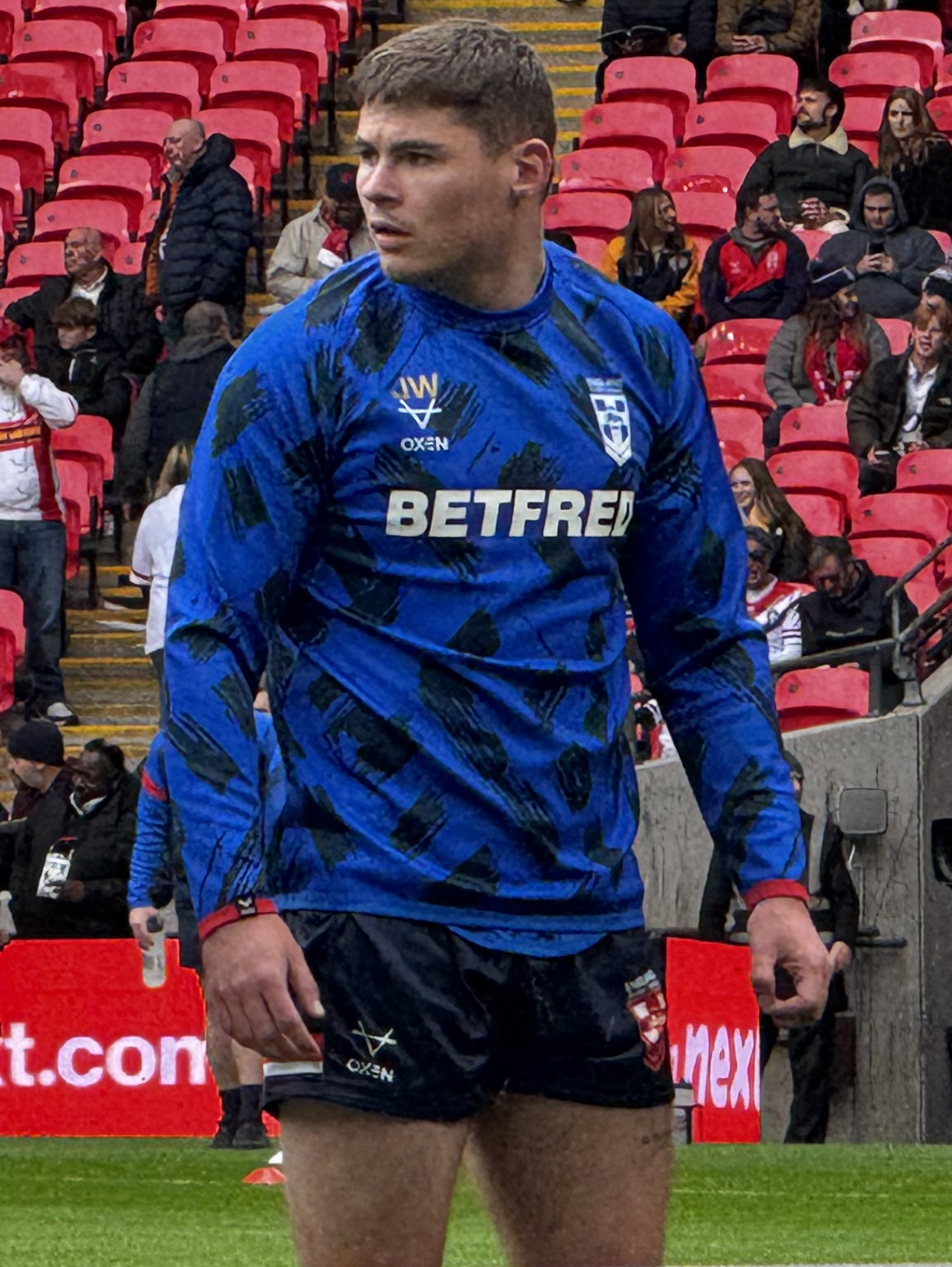

Personal information
- Born: 17 March 2001 (age 25) Wigan, Greater Manchester, England
- Height: 6 ft 2 in (1.88 m)
- Weight: 14 st 7 lb (92 kg)

Playing information
- Position: Fullback, Stand-off, Centre, Wing
Club
Years	Team	Pld	T	G	FG	P
2018–	St Helens	184	86	0	3	347
Representative
Years	Team	Pld	T	G	FG	P
2022–	England	15	5	0	0	20
- Source: As of 4 November 2026

Jack Welsby (born 17 March 2001) is an English professional rugby league footballer who plays as a fullback, stand-off, centre or winger for St Helens in the Super League and England at international level.

== Background ==
Welsby was born in Wigan, Greater Manchester. Playing for Shevington Sharks ARLFC as a child.

== Playing career ==
=== Club career ===
In 2018, he made his Super League debut for St Helens against Hull FC. He played in the club's 8-4 2020 Super League Grand Final victory over Wigan at the Kingston Communications Stadium in Hull. In the final seconds of play with the scores at 4-4, St Helens attempted a field goal which rebounded off the goal post. Welsby was the first player to the ball from the ricochet and he scored after the full-time siren to win the match for St Helens.

Welsby played for St Helens in their 2021 Challenge Cup Final victory over Castleford. In round 17 of the 2021 Super League season, Welsby scored a hat-trick in St Helens 42–10 over Hull F.C. On 9 October, Welsby played for St Helens in their 2021 Super League Grand Final victory over Catalans Dragons.

In round 20 of the 2022 Betfred Super League season, Welsby kicked a drop goal in golden point extra-time to win the match for St Helens 13–12 against bottom placed Wakefield Trinity. In September, Welsby was awarded young player of the year at the 2022 Super League awards ceremony.

On 24 September, Welsby provided two try assists in St Helens 24-12 Grand Final victory over Leeds. In the 2023 World Club Challenge, Welsby scored the opening try for St Helens in their 13–12 upset victory over Penrith.

In round 15 of the 2023 Super League season, Welsby made his 100th appearance for St Helens and scored two tries in the clubs 34–16 victory over rivals Wigan. In round 20 of the 2023 Super League season, Welsby scored two tries for St Helens in their 22–18 victory over Leeds. Welsby played 29 games for St Helens in the 2023 Super League season scoring 11 tries as the club finished third on the table. Welsby played in St Helens narrow loss against the Catalans Dragons in the semi-final which ended St Helens four-year dominance of the competition.

On 20 December 2023, Welsby signed a four-year contract extension to remain at St Helens until the end of the 2027 Super League season.

Welsby played 23 matches for St Helens in the 2024 Super League season including their golden point elimination playoff final loss against Warrington.

On 23 May 2025, Welsby scored a hat-trick in St Helens 46-4 win over Huddersfield. On 3 June 2025, it was announced that Welsby would miss at least 16 weeks with a knee injury. In round 22 of the 2025 Super League season, Welsby made his return to the St Helens side in their 52-4 win over Huddersfield. In round 1 of the 2026 Super League season, Welsby injured his shoulder during St Helens disappointing loss against Warrington. It was later revealed that Welsby would miss four months and required surgery. In round 10 of the 2026 Super League season, Welbsy returned to the St Helens squad for their match against York. Welsby played 19 matches for St Helens in the 2026 Super League season as the club missed the playoffs finishing 7th on the table.

=== International career ===
On 15 October 2022, Welsby made his England debut against Samoa in the 2021 Rugby League World Cup scoring one try and providing two assists as England won the match 60–6. Welsby played in all five matches for England at the tournament including the semi-final where he made a crucial handling error in golden point extra-time against Samoa. England would go on to lose the match 27–26 at the Emirates Stadium.

In the absence of regular captain George Williams through suspension, Welsby was named captain for the first Tonga test on 22 October 2023, becoming the youngest ever captain. Welsby played in all three tests as England won the series 3–0.
