= 2023 Wigan Warriors season =

English rugby league season

Wigan Warriors 2023 season
- Super League XXIII champions
- Super League XXVIII Rank: 1st
- Play-off result: Champions
- Challenge Cup: Semi finals
- 2023 record: Wins: 24; losses: 8
- Points scored: For: 762; against: 360

Team information
- CEO: Kris Radlinski
- Head Coach: Matt Peet
- Captain: Liam Farrell
- Stadium: DW Stadium
- Avg. attendance: 13,586
- Agg. attendance: 175,462
- High attendance: 24,275
- Low attendance: 11,451

Top scorers
- Tries: Abbas Miski (28)
- Goals: Harry Smith (85)
- Points: Harry Smith (184)
Home colours	Away colours	Third colours
← 2022	List of seasons	2024 →

The 2023 season was the Wigan Warriors's 43rd consecutive season playing in England's top division of rugby league. During the season, they competed in the Super League XXVIII and the 2023 Challenge Cup.

Infobox statistics are correct for all regular season league matches

== Preseason friendlies ==
Date and time	Versus	H/A	Venue	Result	Score	Tries	Goals	Attendance	Report
22 January, 15:00	Whitehaven	A	Recreation Ground	W	22–14	Douglas, Astley (2), Sutton	Eckersley (3/4)		
29 January, 15:00	Barrow Raiders	A	Craven Park	L	14–26	Miski (2), Forber	Eckersley (1/3)		
5 February, 15:00	Salford Red Devils (Sam Powell Testimonial)	H	DW Stadium	W	32–4	French (2), Miski (2), Pearce-Paul, Field	Smith (4/6)		

== Super League ==
=== Regular season ===
==== Fixtures ====
Date and time	Versus	H/A	Venue	Result	Score	Tries	Goals	Attendance	TV	Position	Report
18 February, 13:00	Hull KR	A	Craven Park	L	18–27	Marshall, Field, Pearce-Paul, Wardle	Smith (1/4)	10,029	Channel 4	9th	
24 February, 20:00	Wakefield Trinity	H	DW Stadium	W	60–0	French (2), Marshall (4), Farrell, Field, Powell, Smith, Cust	Smith (8/11)	12,306	Not televised	5th	
3 March, 20:00	Castleford Tigers	A	Wheldon Road	W	36–0	Marshall (3), Havard, King, Field	Smith (4/6) + 2 pen.)	7,565	Not televised	3rd	
9 March, 20:00	Catalans Dragons	H	DW Stadium	L	10–18	Smith	Smith (1/1 + 2 pen.)	11,451	Sky Sports	3rd	
17 March, 19:45	Huddersfield Giants	A	Kirklees Stadium	W	14–12	French (2), Wardle	Smith (1/3)	5,777	Not televised	3rd	
24 March, 20:00	Salford Red Devils	H	DW Stadium	W	20–16	French (2), King	Smith (3/3 + 1 pen.)	11,492	Sky Sports	3rd	
30 March, 20:00	Leigh Leopards	A	Leigh Sports Village	W	34–6	French, Field (2), Wardle, Miski (2), King	Smith (3/7)	9,189	Sky Sports	3rd	
7 April, 15:00	St Helens	H	DW Stadium	W	14–6	Smith, King	Smith (2/2 + 1 pen.)	24,275 (Note: Largest home attendance since the 2005 Good Friday Derby Also largest attendance of the 2023 Super League regular season.)	Sky Sports	2nd	
14 April, 20:00	Warrington Wolves	A	Halliwell Jones Stadium	W	13–6	Wardle, O'Neill	Smith (1/2 + 1 pen.); Drop-goals: Smith	15,026	Sky Sports	2nd	
23 April, 15:00	Wakefield Trinity	H	DW Stadium	W	22–6	Marshall, Miski, Havard, French	Smith (3/4)	12,240	Not televised	1st	
4 May, 20:00	Hull F.C.	A	MKM Stadium	L	10–14	Thornley (2)	Smith (1/2)	10,251	Sky Sports	2nd	
12 May, 20:00	Leeds Rhinos	H	DW Stadium	L	18–40	Miski, French, Thornley	Smith (2/3 + 1 pen.)	12,167	Sky Sports	2nd	
25 May, 20:00	Hull KR	A	Craven Park	W	26–22 (g.p.)	Farrell (3), Marshall (2), Miski	Smith (1/6)	Not recorded	Sky Sports	2nd	
3 June, 15:45	Catalans Dragons	N	St James' Park	L	22–46	Wardle, French, Miski, Marshall, Smithies	Smith (0/5 + 1 pen.)	36,943	Sky Sports	3rd	
9 June, 20:00	St Helens	A	Totally Wicked Stadium	L	16–34	Field, French, Miski	Smith (2/3)	16,272	Sky Sports	6th	
25 June, 15:00	Salford Red Devils	A	AJ Bell Stadium	W	26–6	Shorrocks, Farrell (2), Miski, Marshall	Smith (3/5)	7,854	Not televised	3rd	
30 June, 20:00	Huddersfield Giants	H	DW Stadium	W	22–6	Miski (2), Field, Marshall	Smith (3/4)	13,464	Not televised	3rd	
7 July, 19:45	Wakefield Trinity	A	Belle Vue	L	26–27 (g.p.)	Field (2), French, Marshall, King	Smith (3/5)	4,185	Not televised	4th	
14 July, 20:00	Warrington Wolves	H	DW Stadium	W	26–12	Marshall, French, Wardle, Farrell	Smith (4/4 + 1 pen.)	13,105	Sky Sports	3rd	
29 July, 13:00	Leigh Leopards	H	DW Stadium	W	44–18	French (2), King, Dupree, Miski (3), Marshall	Smith (6/8)	15,377	Channel 4	2nd	
4 August, 20:00	Hull KR	H	DW Stadium	W	64–6	Miski (4), Wardle, King, Smith, Mago, Field (3), Marshall	Smith (8/12)	11,464	Not televised	2nd	
18 August, 20:00	Hull FC	H	DW Stadium	W	13–12 (g.p.)	Marshall, King, Wardle	Smith (0/3); Drop-goals: Smith	12,107	Not televised	2nd	
26 August, 18:00	Catalans Dragons	A	Stade Gilbert Brutus	W	34–0	Miski (3), King, French, Wardle	Smith (4/5)	10,614	Sky Sports	2nd	
1 September, 20:00	Salford Red Devils	H	DW Stadium	W	26–8	Farrell, Miski, Wardle, Field, King	Smith (3/5)	12,905	Sky Sports	1st	
9 September, 14:45	Leeds Rhinos	A	Headingley	W	50–0	Wardle (3), Field, Marshall, Pearce-Paul, Miski, Farrell, Mago	Smith (7/9)	12,861	Sky Sports	1st	
15 September, 20:00	Castleford Tigers	H	DW Stadium	W	48–6	Miski (5), Wardle, Powell, Pearce-Paul, Field, French	Smith (1/5), Hampshire (3/5)	13,109	Not televised	1st	
22 September, 20:00	Leigh Leopards	A	Leigh Sports Village	W	10–6	Field, Wardle	Smith (1/2)	10,308	Sky Sports	1st	

==== Table ====
Pos	Team	Pld	W	D	L	PF	PA	PD	Pts	Qualification
1	Wigan Warriors (L, C)	27	20	0	7	722	360	+362	40	Qualification to Semi-finals
2	Catalans Dragons	27	20	0	7	722	420	+302	40	Qualification to Semi-finals
3	St. Helens	27	20	0	7	613	366	+247	40	Qualification to Eliminators
4	Hull Kingston Rovers	27	16	0	11	589	498	+91	32	Qualification to Eliminators
5	Leigh Leopards	27	16	0	11	585	508	+77	32	Qualification to Eliminators
6	Warrington Wolves	27	14	0	13	597	512	+85	28	Qualification to Eliminators
7	Salford Red Devils	27	13	0	14	494	512	−18	26	
8	Leeds Rhinos	27	12	0	15	535	534	+1	24	
9	Huddersfield Giants	27	11	0	16	473	552	−79	22	
10	Hull FC	27	10	0	17	476	654	−178	20	
11	Castleford Tigers	27	6	0	21	323	774	−451	12	
12	Wakefield Trinity (R)	27	4	0	23	303	742	−439	8	Relegation to Championship

Source: Super League
(C) Champions; (L) League Leaders' Shield Winners; (R) Relegated

=== Play-offs ===
Date and time	Round	Versus	H/A	Venue	Result	Score	Tries	Goals	Attendance	TV	Report
7 October, 12:45	Semi-final	Hull KR	H	DW Stadium	W	42–12	Marshall (3), Field (2), King, Miski	Smith (7/7)	15,162	Sky Sports and Channel 4	
14 October, 18:00	Grand Final	Catalans Dragons	N	Old Trafford	W	10–2	Marshall	Smith (1/1 + 2 pen.)	58,137	Sky Sports	

== Challenge Cup ==
Date and time	Round	Versus	H/A	Venue	Result	Score	Tries	Goals	Attendance	TV	Report
20 May, 14:30	Round 6	Leeds Rhinos	A	Headingley	W	18–14	French (2), Nsemba, Wardle	Smith (1/4)	7,103	BBC One	
18 June, 14:30	Quarter Finals	Warrington Wolves	H	DW Stadium	W	14–12	King, Miski	Smith (2/2 + 1 pen.)	9,302	BBC One	
23 July, 17:00	Semi Finals	Hull KR	N	Headingley	L	10–11 (GP)	Field	Smith (1/1 + 1 pen.)	10,926	BBC Two	

== Transfers ==
=== Gains ===
Player	Club	Contract	Date
(Ireland) Toby King	Warrington Wolves	1 Year Loan	August 2022
(England) Jake Wardle	Huddersfield Giants	3 Years	October 2022
(England) Ryan Hampshire	Castleford Tigers	1 Year + 2 Years	January 2023
(England) Tyler Dupree	Salford Red Devils		

=== Losses ===
Player	Club	Contract	Date
(New Zealand) Thomas Leuluai	Retired (Note: Leuluai went on to play the warm up games for New Zealand ahead of the 2021 Rugby League World Cup following his final game for Wigan. He then became an assistant coach for Wigan Warriors and his national side.)	N/A	August 2022
(England) Oliver Partington	Salford Red Devils	2 years	September 2022
(England) Jake Bibby	Huddersfield Giants	3 years	September 2022
(England) Jack Bibby	Huddersfield Giants	3 years	October 2022
(England) Sam Halsall	Huddersfield Giants	3 years	October 2022
(England) John Bateman	Wests Tigers		December 2022
(England) Umyla Hanley	Leigh Leopards	1 Year trial	January 2023
(Ireland) Brad Singleton	Salford Red Devils		July 2023

== Squad ==
2023 Wigan Warriors Squad
First team squad			Coaching staff
(Australia) 1 Jai Field – FB, SO; (Australia) 2 Bevan French – FB, WG; (Ireland) 3 Toby King (on loan from Warrington) – CE; (England) 4 Jake Wardle – CE, WG; (England) 5 Liam Marshall – WG; (Australia) 6 Cade Cust – SO, HK; (England) 7 Harry Smith (gk) – SH, SO; (England) 9 Sam Powell – HK, SH, SO; (Ireland) 10 Liam Byrne – PR; (Samoa) 11 Willie Isa – SR, CE, LF, WG; (England) 12 Liam Farrell (c) – SR, LF; (England) 13 Morgan Smithies – LF, SR	(England) 14 Mike Cooper – PR, LF; (Australia) 15 Kaide Ellis – PR, LF; (England) 16 Ethan Havard – PR; (England) 17 Kai Pearce-Paul – SR, CE; (England) 19 Joe Shorrocks – LF, SR; (New Zealand) 20 Patrick Mago – PR; (England) 21 Iain Thornley – CE, WG; (England) 22 Brad O'Neill – HK, LF; (Lebanon) 23 Abbas Miski – WG; (England) 24 Logan Astey – SO, SH; (England) 25 Alex Sutton – FB, CE, WG; (England) 26 Harvie Hill	(England) 27 Junior Nsemba – LF; (England) 28 Zach Eckersley; (England) 29 Tom Forber; (Brazil) 30 Ramon Silva; (England) 32 Ryan Hampshire – FB, SH, SO, WG; (England) 34 Tyler Dupree – PR	Head coach: (England) Matt Peet; Assistant coaches: (New Zealand) Thomas Leuluai; (England) Sean O’Loughlin; Legend: (c) Captain(s); (vc) Vice-captain(s); (gk) = Goal kicker; Updated: 27 December 2022; Source(s):
