= 2024 Wigan Warriors season =

English rugby league season

Wigan Warriors 2024 season
- Super League XXIV champions 2024 Challenge Cup champions
- 2024 Super League season Rank: 1st
- Play-off result: Champions
- Challenge Cup: Champions
- 2024 record: Wins: 28; draws: 0; losses: 5
- Points scored: For: 723; against: 338 (regular season only)

Team information
- Chairman: Prof. Chris Brooks
- Head Coach: Matt Peet
- Captain: Liam Farrell
- Stadium: Brick Community Stadium
- Avg. attendance: 14,910
- Agg. attendance: 193,826
- High attendance: 20,152 (vs St Helens; Round 17)
- Low attendance: 11,660 (vs Huddersfield; Round 20)

Top scorers
- Tries: Liam Marshall (27)
- Goals: Adam Keighran (70)
- Points: Adam Keighran (172)
Home colours	Away colours
← 2023	List of seasons	2025 →

The 2024 season was the Wigan Warriors's 44th consecutive season playing in England's top division of rugby league. During the season, they competed in the Super League XXIX, the 2024 Challenge Cup, and the 2024 World Club Challenge.

The 2024 season saw Wigan complete the quadruple, the club's second in its history after the 1993–94 season, and only the fourth modern quadruple in British rugby league. In Sky Sports end of season review, Wigan were praised for their academy, coaching setup, squad hunger, and utilisation of Bevan French. The Guardian described the 2024 squad as one of the all time greats.

The 2024 Wigan team won the BBC Sports Team of the Year Award, seeing the club win for a second time after their first in 1994.

== Preseason friendlies ==
Date and time	Versus	H/A	Venue	Result	Score	Tries	Goals	Attendance	Report
20 January; 14:00	Midlands Hurricanes	A	Alexander Stadium	W	24–20	Brown (2), Kerr (2)	Farrimond (4/4)	Unknown	
26 January, 20:00	Wakefield Trinity	A	Belle Vue	A (Note: Match abandoned after 63 minutes due to repeated floodlight failure)	12–22 (Note: At time of abandonment)	Douglas, Farrimond	Hampshire (2/2)	Unknown	
4 February, 14:00	Hull F.C.	A	MKM Stadium	W	40–0	Wardle, Mago, French, Dupree, Douglas, Farrimond, Hampshire	Smith (4/5), Keighran (2/2)	Unknown	

== World Club Challenge ==
Date and time	Versus	H/A	Venue	Result	Score	Tries	Goals	Attendance	TV	Report
24 February, 20:00	Penrith Panthers	H	DW Stadium	W	16–12	Miski, Leeming, Wardle	Smith (2/3)	24,091	BBC Two	

== Super League ==
=== Regular season ===
Wigan Warriors claimed the League Leaders' Shield on the final day of the 2024 regular season, and saw four players make the Super League Dream Team.

==== Fixtures ====
Date and time	Versus	H/A	Venue	Result	Score	Tries	Goals	Attendance	TV (Note: Ahead of 2024, Sky Sports announced they would be broadcasting all Super League matches over the next three seasons. Exact TV channels can be sourced by using WayBack Machine on RugbyLeagueOnTV. NB Not all games were broadcast on Sky Sports TV (advertised as "Sky Sports Exclusives"), the remainder were broadcast via Super League+ and a select few on the BBC. From its launch in August, Sky Sports+ (their on demand services accessible online or via red button) became the home of these remainder games alongside Super League+. Further, games on Main Event were also broadcast on Action or Arena.)	Pos.	Report
17 February, 17:30	Castleford Tigers	A	The Jungle	W	32–4	Mago, French, Marshall (2), Leeming	Smith (4/5 + 1 pen.), Keighran (pen.)	10,170	BBC Two	2nd	
24 February, 15:00	Leigh Leopards	H	DW Stadium	Postponed due to Wigan's participation in the World Club Challenge							
1 March, 20:00	Huddersfield Giants	H	DW Stadium	W	30–16	Marshall (3), French, Dupree	Smith (4/5)	15, 357	Super League+	2nd (Note: With a match in hand)	
9 March, 15:00	London Broncos	A	Plough Lane	W	60–22	Wardle, Miski, Dupree, Hill (2), O’Neill, Mago, Eckersley, Hampshire, Keighran	Keighran (10/11)	4,116	Super League+	1st	
14 March, 20:00	Salford Red Devils	A	AJ Bell Stadium	W	22–12	Marshall, Miski, Wardle, French	Smith (1/2), Keighran (2/2)	6,087	Sky Sports Arena	2nd	
29 March, 15:00 (Good Friday)	St Helens	A	Totally Wicked Stadium	L	4–12	French	Smith (0/1)	17,980	Sky Sports Main Event	4th	
4 April, 20:00	Leigh Leopards	A	Leigh Sports Village	W	40–12	Miski, Isa, French, Smith, Field, Keighran, Nsemba, Marshall	Smith (4/8)	10,308	Sky Sports Action	3rd	
19 April, 20:00 (Note: Played as a double-header with the women's Round 1 Super League 18–8 victory over Barrow Raiders.)	Castleford Tigers	H	DW Stadium	W	36–14	French, Marshall (2), Hampshire (2), Miski	Keighran (2/2), Smith (4/4)	13,029	Super League+	3rd	
26 April, 20:00	Hull KR	A	Craven Park	L	10–26	Miski, Farrell	Keighran (1/2)	Unknown	Sky Sports Action	4th	
2 May, 20:00	Catalans Dragons	H	DW Stadium	W	30–8	Thompson, Smith, Keighran, Farrell, Miski	Smith (5/5)	14,481	Sky Sports Arena	1st	
11 May, 15:00	Huddersfield Giants	A	Kirklees Stadium	W	48–6	Marshall (3), French (2), Leeming, Miski (2)	Smith (8/9)	Unknown	Super League+	1st	
26 May, 15:00	Salford Red Devils	A	AJ Bell Stadium	W	26–6	Keighran, Nsemba, O’Neill, French	Keighran (5/5)	4,087	Sky Sports Mix	2nd	
1 June, 15:00	Warrington Wolves	A	Halliwell Jones Stadium	W	19–18	Nsemba, Marshall, Leeming	Keighran (3/3); Drop-goals: Smith	12,181	Sky Sports Action	2nd	
14 June, 20:00	Castleford Tigers	A	The Jungle	W	10–8	Marshall (2)	Smith (pen.)	Unknown	Super League+	2nd	
21 June, 20:00	London Broncos	H	DW Stadium	W	36–0	Farrimond (2), Marshall, Miski, Wardle (2)	Farrimond (6/6)	14,280	Super League+	1st	
5 July, 20:00	Leigh Leopards	H	DW Stadium	W	24–8	French (2), Marshall, Farrell	Keighran (4/4 + 0 pen.)	16,053	Super League+	1st	
12 July, 20:00	St Helens	H	DW Stadium	W	16–12	Wardle, Keighran, Eckersley	Smith (2/3)	20,152	Sky Sports Main Event	1st	
20 July, 14:00	Hull F.C.	A	MKM Stadium	L	22–24	Marshall (2), O’Neill, Eckersley	Keighran (3/4)	5,771	Super League+	1st	
26 July, 20:00	Warrington Wolves	H	DW Stadium	L	4–40	Marshall	Harry Smith (0/1)	15,764	Sky Sports Action	3rd	
1 August, 20:00	Huddersfield Giants	H	DW Stadium	W	28–14	Wardle, Hampshire, Field, Eckersley	Keighran (4/4 + 2 pen.)	11,660	Sky Sports Action	2nd	
6 August, 20:00 (Note: Originally scheduled for 24 February, 15:00)	Leigh Leopards	H	DW Stadium	W	28–6	Nsemba, Wardle, Keighran, Mago, Hill	Keighran (4/5)	13,249	Sky Sports Action	1st	
10 August, 15:00	Leeds Rhinos	A	Headingley	L	4–30	Marshall	Keighran (0/1)	12,459	Sky Sports Action	2nd	
17 August, 17:00 (Magic Weekend)	St Helens	N	Elland Road	W	20–0	Marshall, Farrimond, Walters	Keighran (3/3 + 1 pen.)	30,810	Sky Sports Action	2nd	
25 August, 15:00	Hull F.C.	H	DW Stadium	W	22–4	Douglas, Eckersley, Nsemba, Farrimond	Keighran (3/4)	12,347	BBC Red Button	2nd	
31 August, 20:00 (BST)	Catalans Dragons	A	Stade Gilbert Brutus	W	26–12	Field, Forber, Nsemba, Keighran	Keighran (4/4 + 1 pen.)	Unknown	Sky Sports Action	2nd	
6 September, 20:00	Hull KR	H	DW Stadium	W	24–20	Miski, Nsemba, French, Marshall (2)	Keighran (2/5)	16,719	Sky Sports Main Event	1st	
13 September, 20:00	Leeds Rhinos	H	DW Stadium	W	38–0	Wardle, French (2), Ellis, Marshall, Miski, Keighran	Keighran (5/7)	15,146	Sky Sports+ Main Channel	1st	
19 September, 20:00	Salford Red Devils	H	DW Stadium	W	64–0	Marshall (2), Field (3), French (2), Eckersley, Wardle, Leeming (2)	Keighran (10/11)	15,589	Sky Sports+ Main Channel	1st	

==== Table ====
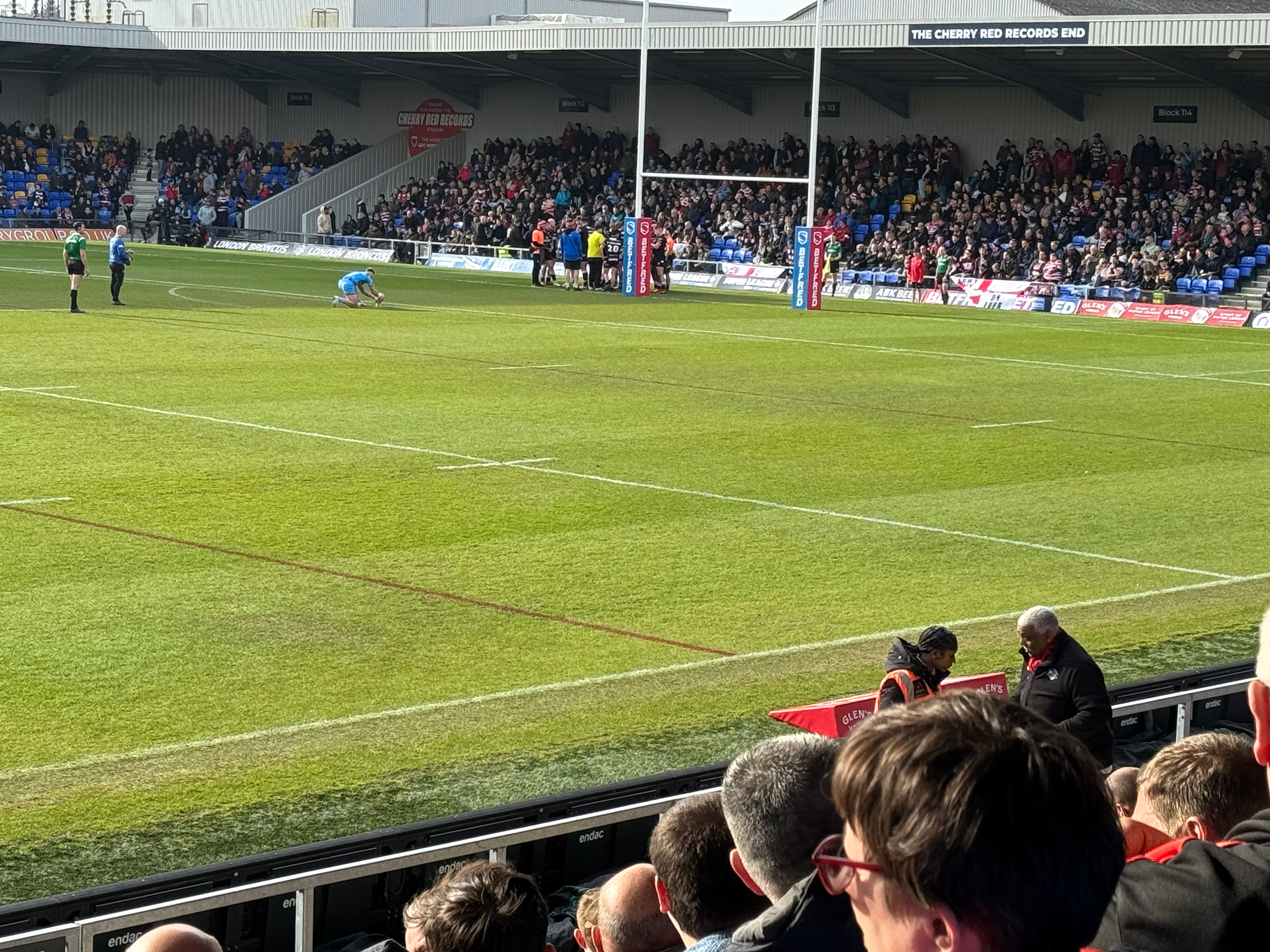
Adam Keighran preparing to kick at goal in front of the Wigan fans at Plough Lane in March 2024

Pos	Team	Pld	W	D	L	PF	PA	PD	Pts	Qualification
1	Wigan Warriors (C)	27	22	0	5	723	338	+385	44	Advance to Semi-finals
2	Hull Kingston Rovers (Y)	27	21	0	6	719	326	+393	42	Advance to Semi-finals
3	Warrington Wolves	27	20	0	7	740	319	+421	40	Advance to Eliminators
4	Salford Red Devils	27	16	0	11	550	547	+3	32	Advance to Eliminators
5	Leigh Leopards	27	15	1	11	566	398	+168	31	Advance to Eliminators
6	St Helens	27	15	0	12	596	388	+208	30	Advance to Eliminators
7	Catalans Dragons	27	15	0	12	474	427	+47	30	
8	Leeds Rhinos	27	14	0	13	530	488	+42	28	
9	Huddersfield Giants	27	10	0	17	468	660	−192	20	
10	Castleford Tigers	27	7	1	19	425	735	−310	15	
11	Hull FC	27	3	0	24	328	894	−566	6	
12	London Broncos (R)	27	3	0	24	317	916	−599	6	Relegated to Championship

(C) Champions; (R) Relegated; (Y) Runners up

=== Play-offs ===
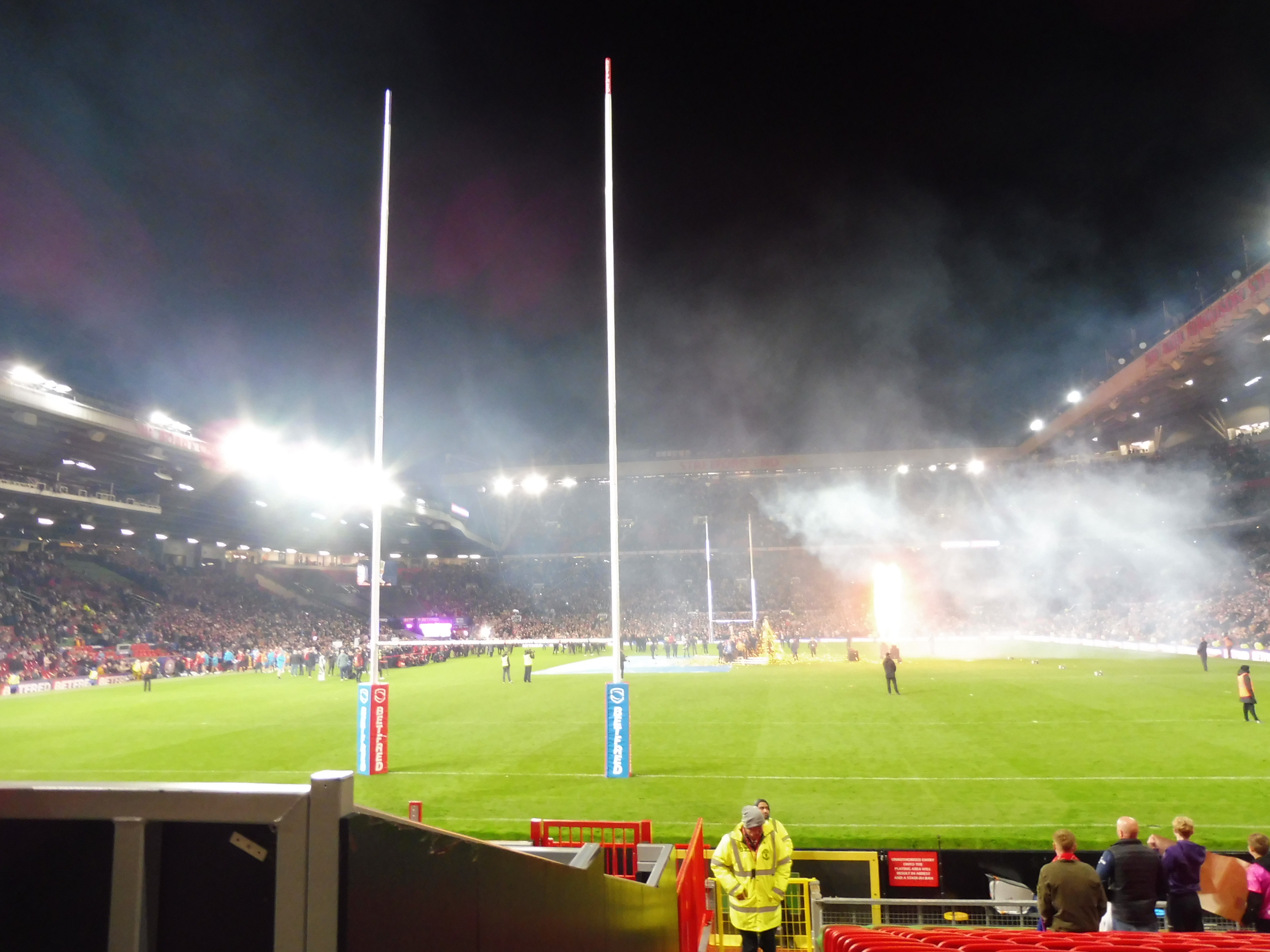
Wigan Warriors celebrating winning the 2024 Super League Grand Final

Date and time	Round	Versus	H/A	Venue	Result	Score	Tries	Goals	Attendance	TV	Report
5 October; 17:30	Semi-finals	Leigh Leopards	H	DW Stadium	W	38–0	Marshall (2), Walters (2), French, Field	Keighran (5/6 + 2 pen.)	20,511	BBC Two	
12 October; 18:00	Grand Final	Hull KR	N	Old Trafford	W	9–2	French	Keighran (1/1 + 1 pen.); Drop-goals: Smith	68,173	Sky Sports Main Event	

== Challenge Cup ==
Date and time	Round	Versus	H/A	Venue	Result	Score	Tries	Goals	Attendance	TV	Report
22 March; 20:00	Round 6	Sheffield Eagles	H	DW Stadium	W	44–18	French (3) Marshall (2) Wardle, Leeming, Mago	Smith (6/9)	5,733	Not Televised	
14 April; 15:00	Quarter-finals	Castleford Tigers	A	The Jungle	W	60–6	Marshall (4), O’Neill, French, Keighran, Miski (2), Leeming, Wardle, Dupree	Smith (6/12)	4,097	Not Televised	
18 May; 13:45	Semi-finals	Hull KR	N	Eco-Power Stadium	W	38–6	Wardle (2), Miski (2), Nsemba, Smith, Dupree	Smith (2/5), Keighran (3/3)	11,163	BBC One	
8 June; 15:00	Final	Warrington Wolves	N	Wembley Stadium	W	18–8	Eckersley, French, Farrell	Smith (3/3)	64,845	BBC One	

== Transfers ==
=== Gains ===
Player	Club	Contract	Date
(England) Sam Walters	Leeds Rhinos	3 Years	June 2023
(England) Kruise Leeming	Gold Coast Titans	4 Years	June 2023
(France) Tiaki Chan	Catalans Dragons	3 Years	June 2023
(Australia) Adam Keighran	Catalans Dragons	2 Years	July 2023
(England) Luke Thompson	Canterbury Bulldogs	4 Years	October 2023
(England) Sam Eseh	Wakefield Trinity	2 Years + 1 Year	October 2023

=== Losses ===
Player	Club	Contract	Date
(England) Kai Pearce-Paul	Newcastle Knights		December 2022
(Ireland) Toby King	Warrington Wolves	End of Loan	September 2023
(England) Logan Astley	Oldham R.L.F.C.	2 Years	October 2023
(Australia) Cade Cust	Salford Red Devils		October 2023
(England) Iain Thornley	Wakefield Trinity	2 Years	October 2023
(England) Kieran Tyrer	Oldham R.L.F.C.		October 2023
(England) Morgan Smithies	Canberra Raiders	3 Years	October 2023
(England) Sam Powell	Warrington Wolves	2 Years	November 2023
(England) Joe Shorrocks	Salford Red Devils		November 2023
(Brazil) Ramon Silva	Barrow Raiders		January 2022

== Squad ==
2024 Wigan Warriors Squad
First team squad			Coaching staff
(Australia) 1 Jai Field – FB, SO; (Lebanon) 2 Abbas Miski – WG; (Australia) 3 Adam Keighran – CE, SO, HK; (England) 4 Jake Wardle – CE, WG; (England) 5 Liam Marshall – WG; (Australia) 6 Bevan French – SO, FB, WG; (England) 7 Harry Smith (gk) – SH, SO; (England) 8 Ethan Havard – PR; (England) 9 Brad O'Neill – HK, LF; (Ireland) 10 Liam Byrne – PR; (Samoa) 11 Willie Isa – SR, CE, LF, WG; (England) 12 Liam Farrell (c) – SR, LF; (Australia) 13 Kaide Ellis – PR, LF	(England) 14 Mike Cooper – PR, LF; (New Zealand) 15 Patrick Mago – PR; (England) 16 Luke Thompson – PR, LF; (England) 17 Kruise Leeming – HK; (England) 19 Tyler Dupree – PR; (England) 20 Harvie Hill – PR; (England) 21 Junior Nsemba – LF; (England) 22 Sam Walters – SR; (England) 23 Ryan Hampshire – FB, SH, SO, WG; (France) 24 Tiaki Chan – PR; (England) 25 Sam Eseh – PR; (England) 26 Zach Eckersley – CE	(England) 27 Tom Forber – HK; (England) 28 Jacob Douglas – WG; (England) 29 Harvey Makin – PR; (England) 30 Jack Farrimond – SH	Head coach: (England) Matt Peet; Assistant coaches: (New Zealand) Thomas Leuluai; (England) Sean O’Loughlin; Legend: (c) Captain(s); (vc) Vice-captain(s); (gk) = Goal kicker; Updated: 11 December 2023; Source(s): 2024 Squad Numbers
