= Tyler Dupree =

England international rugby league footballer

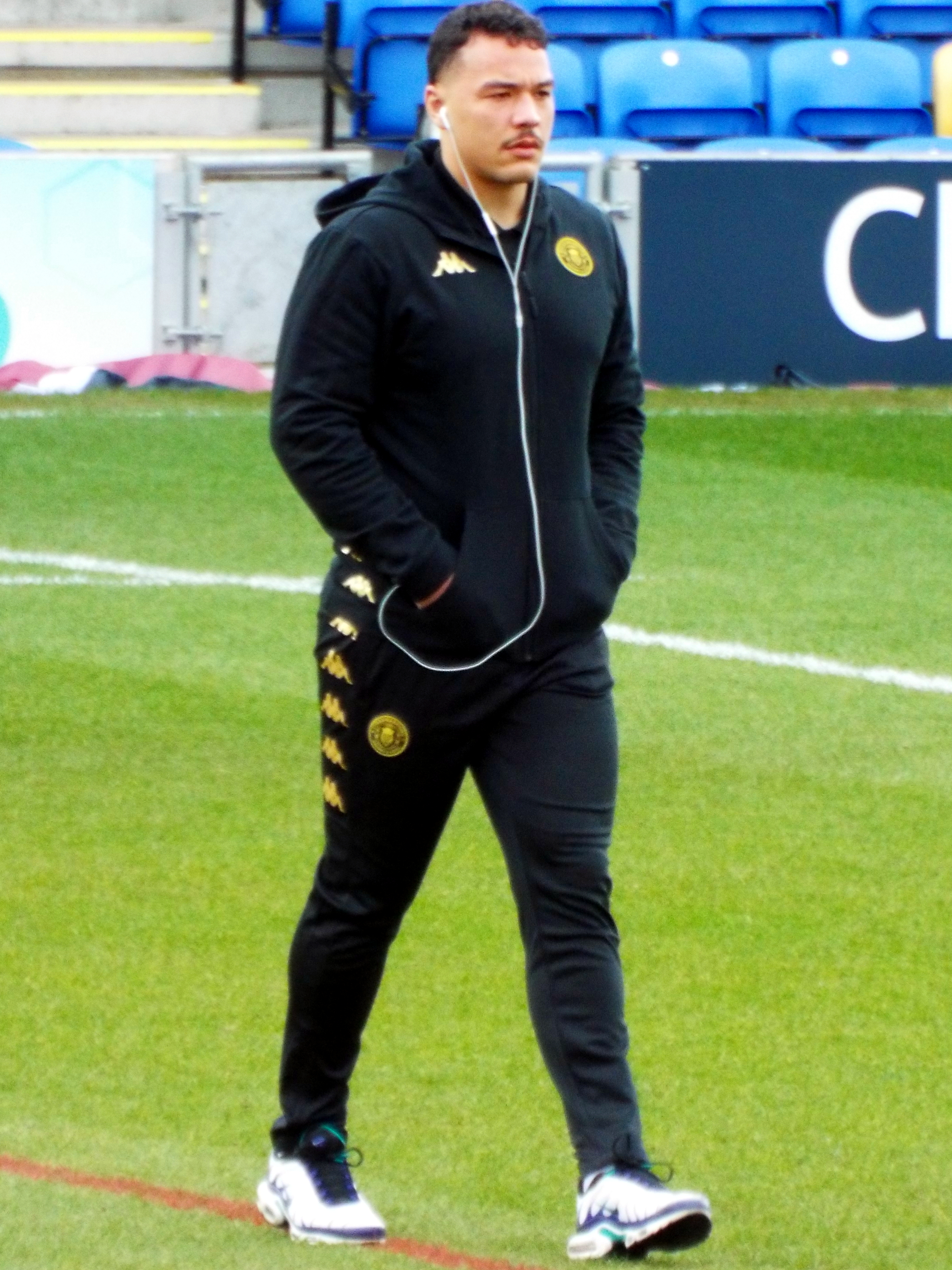

Personal information
- Full name: Tyler Washington Dupree
- Born: 8 February 2000 (age 26) Halifax, West Yorkshire, England
- Height: 6 ft 2 in (1.88 m)
- Weight: 17 st 13 lb (114 kg)

Playing information
- Position: Prop
Club
Years	Team	Pld	T	G	FG	P
2018–20	Leeds Rhinos	0	0	0	0	0
2018(loan)	→ Featherstone Rovers	1	1	0	0	4
2019(loan)	→ York City Knights	4	0	0	0	0
2020(loan)	→ Batley Bulldogs	4	1	0	0	4
2021	Oldham	18	10	1	0	42
2022	Widnes Vikings	7	2	0	0	8
2022–23	Salford Red Devils	35	3	0	0	12
2023–26	Wigan Warriors	62	7	0	0	28
2026(loan)	→ Toulouse Olympique	6	1	0	0	4
2026–	Castleford Tigers	17	0	0	0	0
	Total	154	25	1	0	102
Representative
Years	Team	Pld	T	G	FG	P
2022–	England Knights	1	0	0	0	0
2023–24	England	3	0	0	0	0
2026–	United States	1	0	0	0	0
- Source: As of 17 October 2026
- Relatives: Champion Jack Dupree (grandfather); Billy Joe Dupree (uncle)

Tyler Dupree (born 8 February 2000) is a professional rugby league footballer who plays as prop forward for Castleford Tigers in the Super League and for England and the United States at international level.

He has previously played for Salford Red Devils and Wigan Warriors in the Super League, and for Oldham and Widnes Vikings in the RFL Championship. He has spent time on loan from Wigan at Toulouse Olympique in the Super League, and from Leeds Rhinos at Featherstone Rovers, York City Knights and Batley Bulldogs in the Championship.

== Background ==
Dupree was born in Halifax, West Yorkshire, England.

Dupree played junior rugby league for Siddal and was part of the Halifax Elite Rugby Academy. At the age of 16, he signed scholarship forms with Salford Red Devils before later joining the academy at Leeds Rhinos. Dupree represented Yorkshire Academy Origin and England Academy whilst at Leeds.

== Playing career ==
=== Leeds Rhinos ===
Dupree spent time on loan from Leeds in the RFL Championship with Featherstone Rovers, York City Knights and Batley Bulldogs.

After being released by Leeds without making a first team appearance, Dupree considered quitting the sport.

=== Oldham RLFC ===
In August 2020, Dupree signed a one-year deal with Oldham RLFC. He scored ten tries in eighteen appearances, making him the club's top try scorer for the 2021 season. Despite the club's relegation from the Championship, he received the Championship Young Player of the Year award in recognition of his performances. He subsequently joined Widnes Vikings.

=== Salford Red Devils ===
In May 2022, Dupree was signed by Salford in an exchange deal which saw Josh Johnson transfer from Salford to Widnes. He made his Super League debut against his former club Leeds Rhinos.

In May 2023, Dupree submitted a transfer request, which was rejected by Salford.

=== Wigan Warriors ===
In July 2023, Dupree was signed by Wigan Warriors for an undisclosed fee, with Brad Singleton moving from Wigan to Salford as part of the deal. In round 20 of the 2023 Super League season, Dupree made his Wigan debut and scored a try in the club's 44–18 victory over rivals Leigh. On 14 October 2023, Dupree played in Wigan's 2023 Super League Grand Final victory over the Catalans Dragons.

On 12 October 2024, Dupree played in Wigan's 9–2 2024 Super League Grand Final victory over Hull Kingston Rovers.

On 1 March 2025, Dupree became the first Super League player to score a try at the Rugby League Las Vegas event in Wigan's 48–24 win against Warrington Wolves.

==== Toulouse Olympique (loan) ====
On 4 November 2025, it was announced that Dupree would join Toulouse Olympique on a season-long loan for 2026. On 27 April, the loan was terminated and Dupree was released from his Wigan contract to enable him to join Castleford with immediate effect.

=== Castleford Tigers ===
On 27 April 2026, Castleford Tigers announced the signing of Dupree on a three-and-a-half-year deal. It was reported he had previously agreed terms to join from the 2027 season, though Castleford moved to complete the transfer with immediate effect. He made his debut in round 10 against Hull KR. In round 24, Dupree was sin-binned following an altercation with St Helens player Jackson Hastings, who was sent off for punching Dupree and banned for the remainder of the season. As both players were leaving the pitch, Dupree was prevented from following Hastings down the tunnel by Tigers assistant coach Scott Murrell. In the final round, Dupree was struck with an elbow to the head by Huddersfield's Fenton Rogers; the incident was missed by the on-field referee, with Rogers sent off following intervention from the video referee. Dupree made seventeen appearances throughout the year.

== International career ==
In April 2023, Dupree made his international debut for England against France.

On 2 October 2026, he received a call up for the United States in their match against Wales on 17 October 2026 in Swansea.

== Personal life ==
Dupree's uncle Billy Joe Dupree played American football for the Dallas Cowboys, with whom he won a Super Bowl.

In October 2026, Dupree joined the coaching staff at Halifax-based amateur club Ovendon R.L.F.C.

== Club statistics ==
Appearances and points in all competitions by year
Club	Season	Tier	App	T	G	DG	Pts
Leeds Rhinos	2020	Super League	0	0	0	0	0
→ Featherstone Rovers (loan)	2018	Championship	1	1	0	0	4
→ York City Knights (loan)	2019	Championship	4	0	0	0	0
→ Batley Bulldogs (loan)	2020	Championship	4	1	0	0	4
Oldham	2021	Championship	18	10	0	0	40
Widnes Vikings	2022	Championship	7	2	0	0	8
Salford Red Devils	2022	Super League	14	0	0	0	0
Salford Red Devils	2023	Super League	21	3	0	0	12
Salford Red Devils	Total		35	3	0	0	12
Wigan Warriors	2023	Super League	9	1	0	0	4
Wigan Warriors	2024	Super League	29	4	0	0	16
Wigan Warriors	2025	Super League	24	2	0	0	8
Wigan Warriors	Total		62	7	0	0	28
→ Toulouse Olympique (loan)	2026	Super League	6	1	0	0	4
Castleford Tigers	2026	Super League	17	0	0	0	0
Castleford Tigers	2027	Super League	0	0	0	0	0
Castleford Tigers	Total		17	0	0	0	0
Career total			154	25	0	0	100

As of match played 12 September 2026

== Honours ==
=== Wigan Warriors ===
- Super League
  - Winners (2): 2023, 2024
- League Leaders' Shield
  - Winners (2): 2023, 2024
- World Club Challenge
  - Winners (1): 2024

=== Individual ===
- Championship Young Player of the Year
  - Winners (1): 2021
