= Junior Nsemba =

England international rugby league footballer

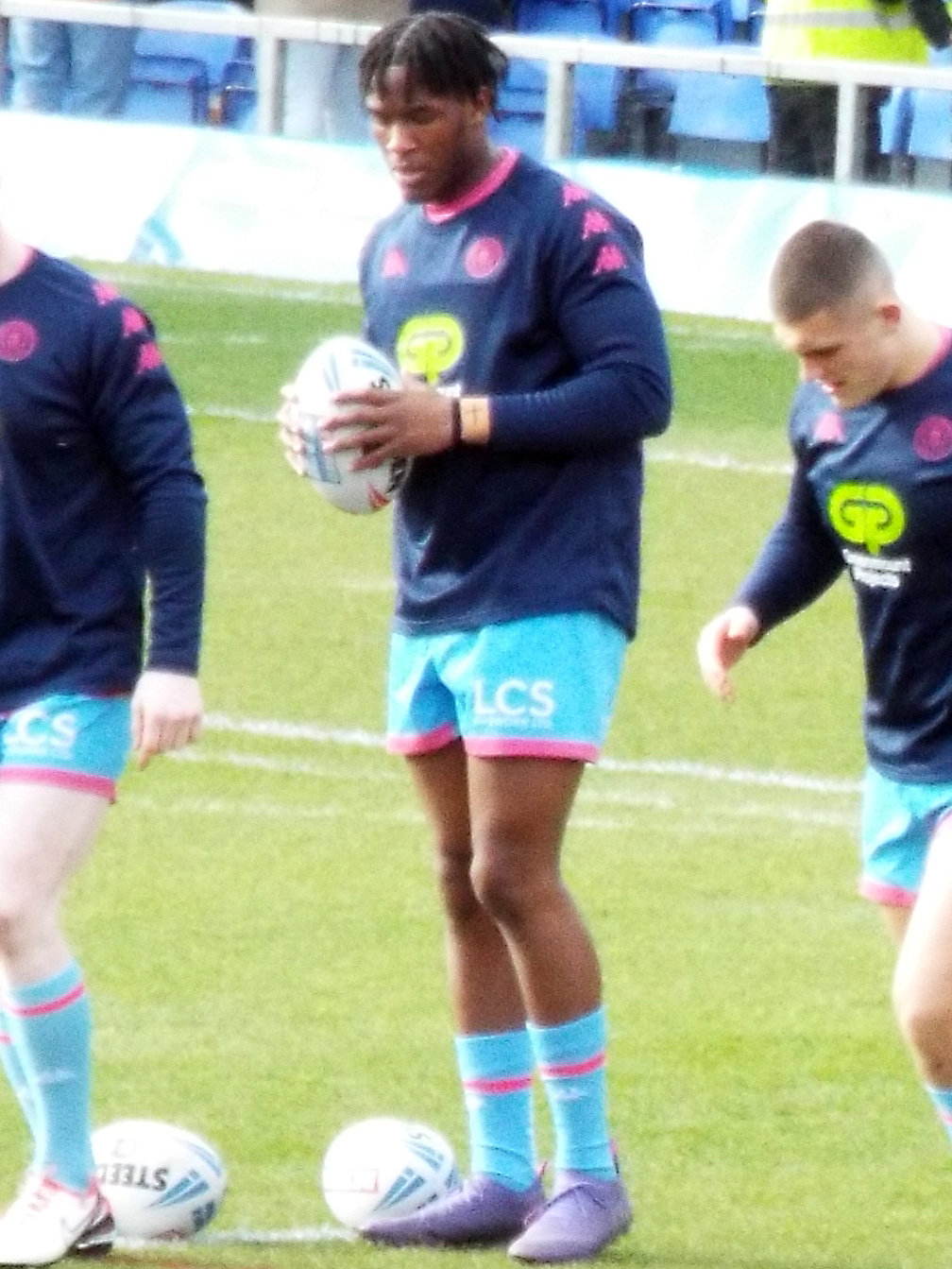

Personal information
- Full name: Junior Nsemba
- Born: 27 June 2004 (age 22) Wigan, Greater Manchester, England
- Height: 6 ft 5 in (1.95 m)
- Weight: 16 st 7 lb (105 kg)

Playing information
- Position: Prop, Second-row
Club
Years	Team	Pld	T	G	FG	P
2022–	Wigan Warriors	74	18	0	0	72
2023(loan)	→ Whitehaven	3	1	0	0	4
	Total	77	19	0	0	76
Representative
Years	Team	Pld	T	G	FG	P
2024–	England	4	0	0	0	0
- Source: As of 6 November 2026
- Relatives: Rigobert Song (uncle); Alex Song (cousin)

Junior Nsemba is a professional rugby league footballer who plays as a prop or second-row forward for the Wigan Warriors in the Super League and England at international level.

== Background ==
Born in Wigan, Nsemba is of Cameroonian heritage, both his parents emigrated to Wigan from Cameroon prior to his birth. He began playing junior rugby league at Wigan St Judes from the age of 11.

He is the nephew and cousin of former footballers Rigobert and Alex Song, respectively.

== Playing career ==
=== Wigan Warriors ===
In August 2022, Nsemba made his Super League début for Wigan against Hull Kingston Rovers. In 2023, Nsemba came off the bench to score his first career try in an 18–14 victory against Leeds Rhinos in the 6th round of the Challenge Cup. Nsemba made 15 senior appearances for Wigan across the 2023 season, signing a four year contract at the end of the season in which Wigan won the League Leaders' Shield and Super League Grand Final. On 8 June 2024, Nsemba played in Wigan's 2024 Challenge Cup final victory over Warrington Wolves. Nsemba made the Super League Dream Team for the 2024 Super League season. Two days later, he signed a new six-year contract, keeping him at the club until 2030.

On 12 October 2024, Nsemba played in Wigan's 9–2 2024 Super League Grand Final victory over Hull Kingston Rovers.

On 9 October 2025, Nsemba played in Wigan's 24–6 2025 Super League Grand Final loss against Hull Kingston Rovers. On 30 May 2026, Nsemba played in Wigan's 2026 Challenge Cup final victory against Hull Kingston Rovers. Nsemba was controversially not sent off in the second half of the match for a tackle on Hull KR's Bill Leyland. Hull Kingston Rovers head coach Willie Peters described the tackle as "one of the worst he had ever seen".

During Wigan's 2026 Magic Weekend victory, Nsemba suffered a hamstring injury ruling him out for one month.

== International ==
On 2 November 2024 he made his début for England in the 34–16 win over Samoa.

== Honours ==
=== Wigan Warriors ===
- Super League
  - Winner (2): 2023, 2024
- League Leaders' Shield
  - Winner (3): 2023, 2024, 2026
- Challenge Cup
  - Winner (2): 2024, 2026

=== Individual ===
- Super League Dream Team
  - Winner: 2024
- Super League Young Player Of The Year
  - Winner: 2024
