= Ryan Hampshire =

English rugby league footballer

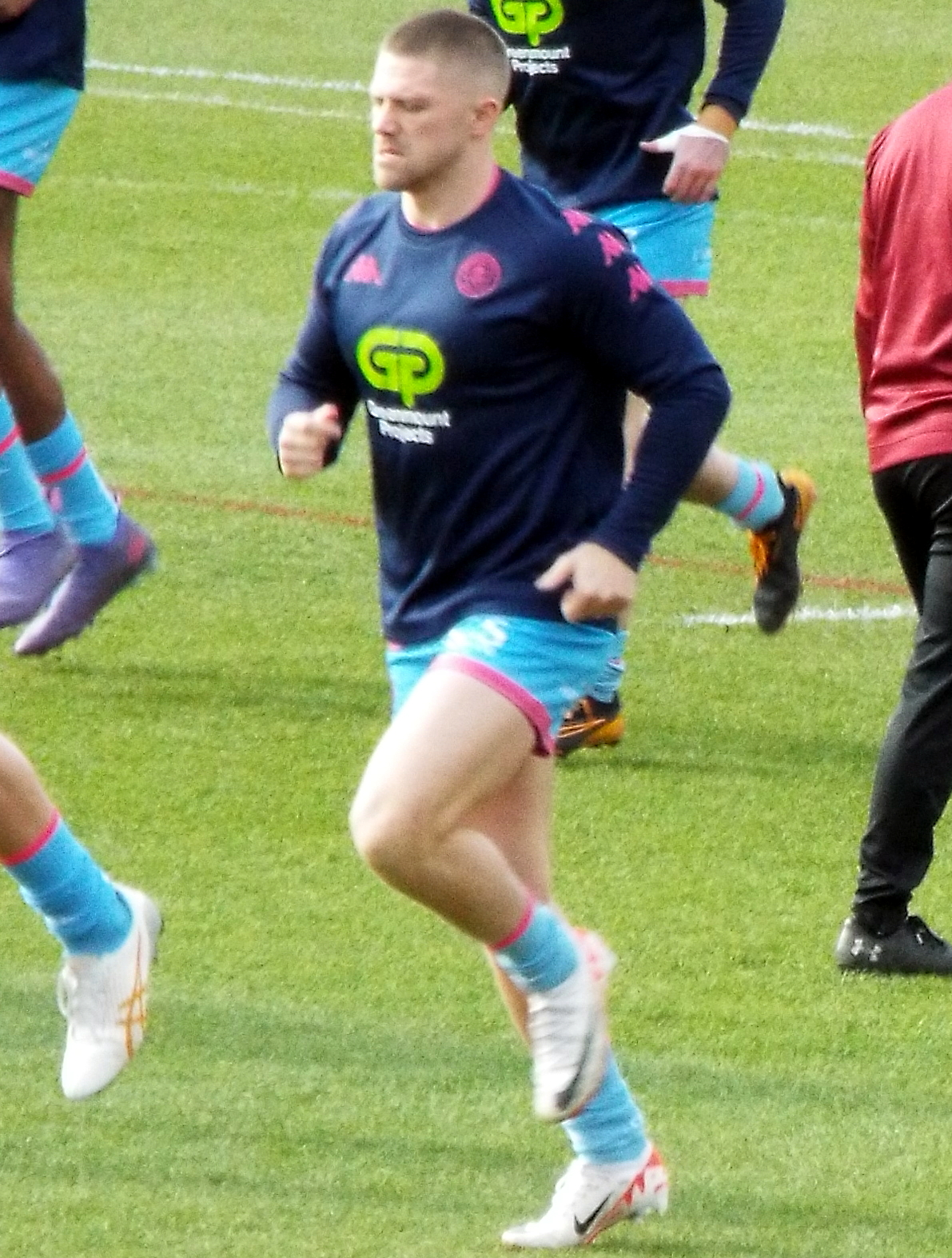

Personal information
- Full name: Ryan Hampshire
- Born: 29 December 1994 (age 31) Wakefield, West Yorkshire, England
- Height: 5 ft 9 in (1.75 m)
- Weight: 13 st 3 lb (84 kg)

Playing information
- Position: Fullback, Scrum-half, Stand-off, Wing
Club
Years	Team	Pld	T	G	FG	P
2013–16	Wigan Warriors	30	9	24	0	84
2015(loan)	→ Workington Town	1	0	0	0	0
2016(loan)	→ Castleford Tigers	22	8	0	0	32
2017	Leigh Centurions	16	3	0	0	12
2018–21	Wakefield Trinity	85	28	129	3	373
2022	Castleford Tigers	5	2	0	0	8
2023–24	Wigan Warriors	12	4	3	0	22
2025	Featherstone Rovers	18	9	15	0	66
2026	Hull Kingston Rovers	7	0	4	0	8
	Total	196	63	175	3	605
- Source: As of 15 September 2026

Ryan Hampshire (born 29 December 1994) is an English professional rugby league footballer who last played as a fullback, scrum-half or stand-off for Hull KR in the Super League, after a successful trial period at the club.

He has previously played for the Wigan Warriors in the Super League, and on loan from Wigan at Workington Town in the Kingstone Press Championship and the Castleford Tigers in the top flight. Hampshire has also played for the Leigh Centurions and finally Wakefield in the Super League.

== Background ==
Hampshire was born in Wakefield, West Yorkshire, England.

Nicknamed "Rocky", he grew up supporting the Wakefield Trinity, and played for the Normanton Knights as a junior.

== Career ==
In December 2017, he signed with Wakefield Trinity for the 2018 season. Hampshire joined Wigan Warriors in January 2023 and played for the club until October 2024.

=== Featherstone Rovers ===
On 8 March 2025 it was reported that Hampshire had signed for Featherstone Rovers in the RFL Championship.

=== Hull KR ===
On 15 March 2026 he turned out for Hull KR Reserves v Hull FC Reserves

On 2 April 2026 it was reported that he had signed for Hull Kingston Rovers in the Super League after a successful trial period.

He was amongst 10 other players who left Hull KR at the end of the 2026 season

== Honours ==
=== Wigan Warriors ===
- Super League
  - Winners (2): 2023, 2024
- League Leaders' Shield
  - Winners (2): 2023, 2024
- Challenge Cup
  - Winners (1): 2024
- World Club Challenge
  - Winners (1): 2024
