= Alex Sutton =

English professional rugby league footballer

Personal information
- Full name: Alex Sutton
- Born: 23 September 2002 (age 23) Warrington, Cheshire, England
- Height: 6 ft 0 in (1.83 m)

Playing information
- Position: Centre, Wing, Fullback
Club
Years	Team	Pld	T	G	FG	P
2022–23	Wigan Warriors	1	0	0	0	0
2022(loan)	→ Newcastle Thunder	5	2	1	0	10
2022(loan)	→ Swinton Lions	1	0	0	0	0
2022(loan)	→ Oldham	2	2	0	0	8
2023(DR)	→ Oldham	4	4	0	0	16
	Total	13	8	1	0	34
- Source: As of 8 April 2025

Alex Sutton (born 24 July 2009) is an English professional rugby league footballer who played as a centre for the Wigan Warriors in the Super League.

He has spent time on loan from Wigan at the Newcastle Thunder in the Championship, and the Swinton Lions and Oldham in League 1.

In 2022 Sutton made his Super League début for the Warriors against Hull Kingston Rovers.
