= Abbas Miski =

Lebanon international rugby league footballer

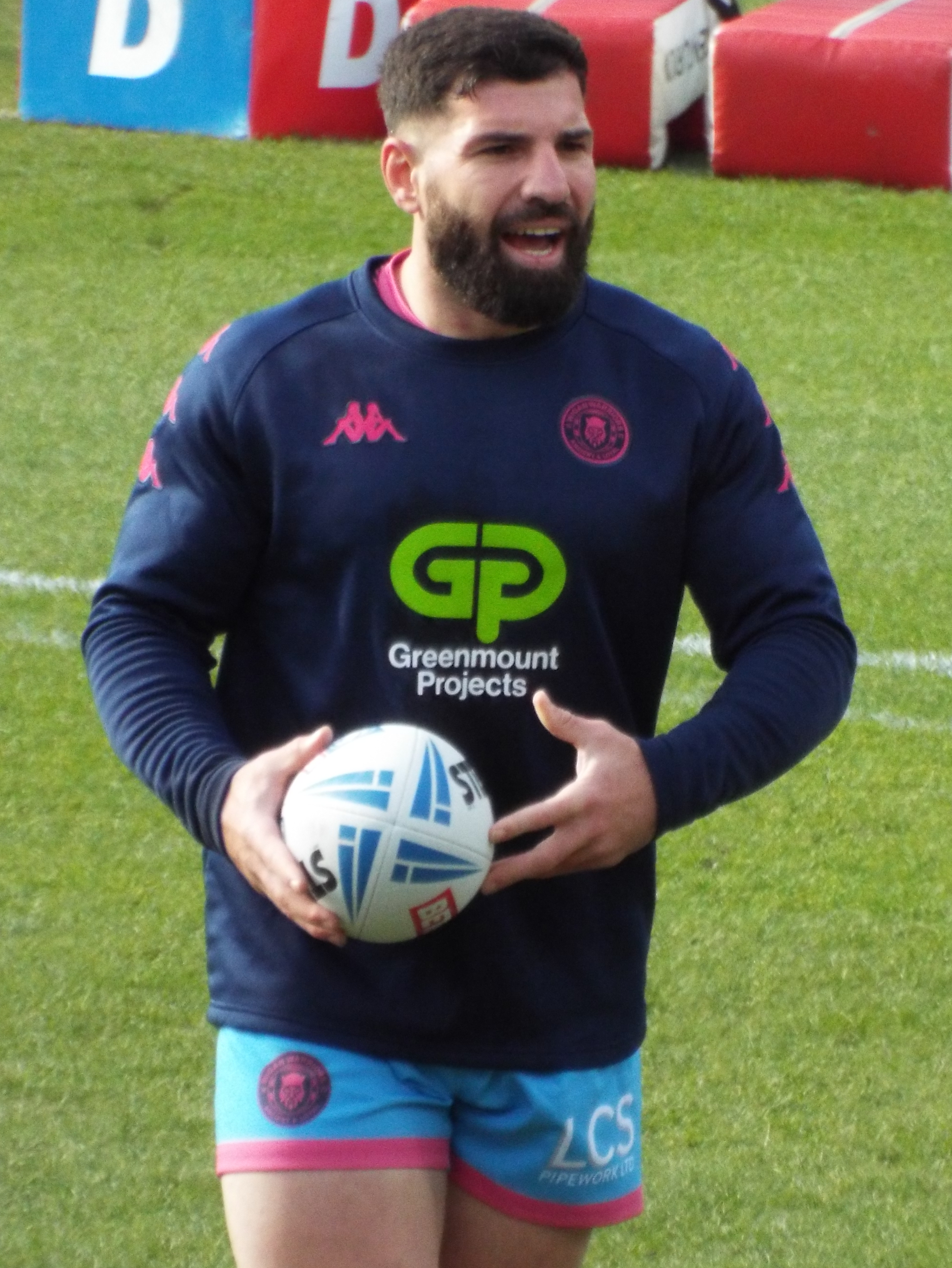

Personal information
- Full name: Abbas Miski عباس مسكي
- Born: 25 July 1995 (age 31) Penrith, Sydney, Australia
- Height: 6 ft 0 in (1.82 m)
- Weight: 15 st 10 lb (100 kg)

Playing information
- Position: Wing
Club
Years	Team	Pld	T	G	FG	P
2019–20	Manly Sea Eagles	6	2	0	0	8
2021	London Broncos	22	19	0	0	76
2022–	Wigan Warriors	78	63	0	0	236
2022(loan)	→ Newcastle Thunder	1	0	0	0	0
2023(DR)	→ London Broncos	1	1	0	0	4
	Total	108	85	0	0	324
Representative
Years	Team	Pld	T	G	FG	P
2014–	Lebanon	16	16	10	0	84
- Source: As of 20 November 2026

Abbas Miski (Arabic: عباس مسكي; born 25 July 1995) is a Lebanese international rugby league footballer who plays as a winger for the Wigan Warriors in the Super League.

He previously played for the Manly-Warringah Sea Eagles in the NRL, and the North Sydney Bears and the Blacktown Workers Sea Eagles in the Canterbury Cup NSW competition. Miski has also spent time on loan from Wigan at the Newcastle Thunder in the Championship.

Miski was injured during the 2025 Super League Grand Final, and was ruled out for the start of the 2026 season. On 15 May 2026 Matt Peet announced that he will not play first-team for the Warriors in 2026 due to salary cap restrictions, but will be able to play for the reserves.

== Background ==
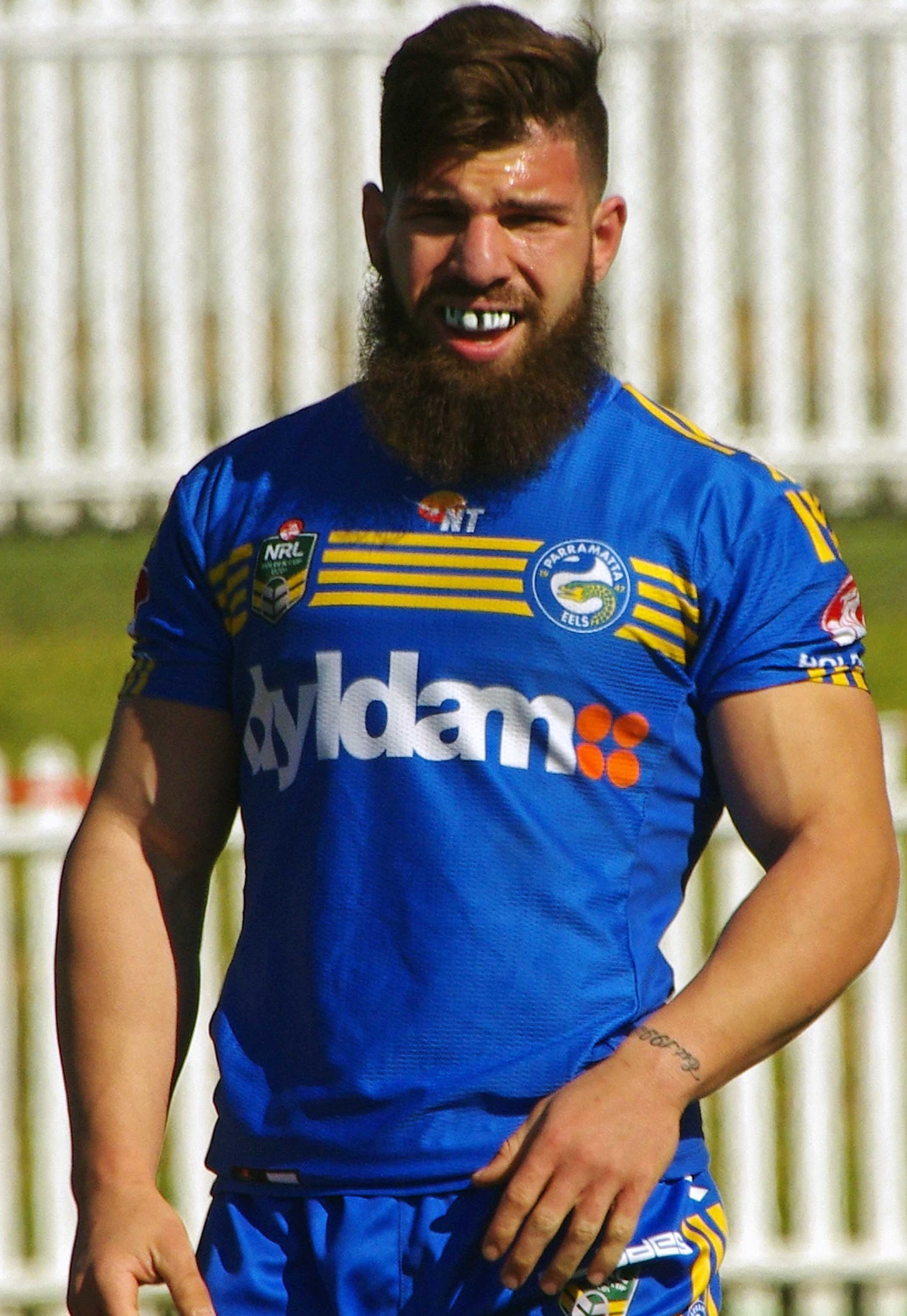
Miski playing for the Parramatta Eels in 2015

Miski was born in Penrith, New South Wales, Australia, the son of Lebanese immigrants to Australia. He is Muslim.

Miski played junior rugby league for the Arncliffe Scots and the Kingsgrove Colts. He played S. G. Ball Cup for St. George, represented Lebanon at under-18 level in 2013, and played for the Parramatta Eels in the National Youth Competition in 2015, scoring 12 tries in 24 matches.

== Club career ==
=== North Sydney Bears ===
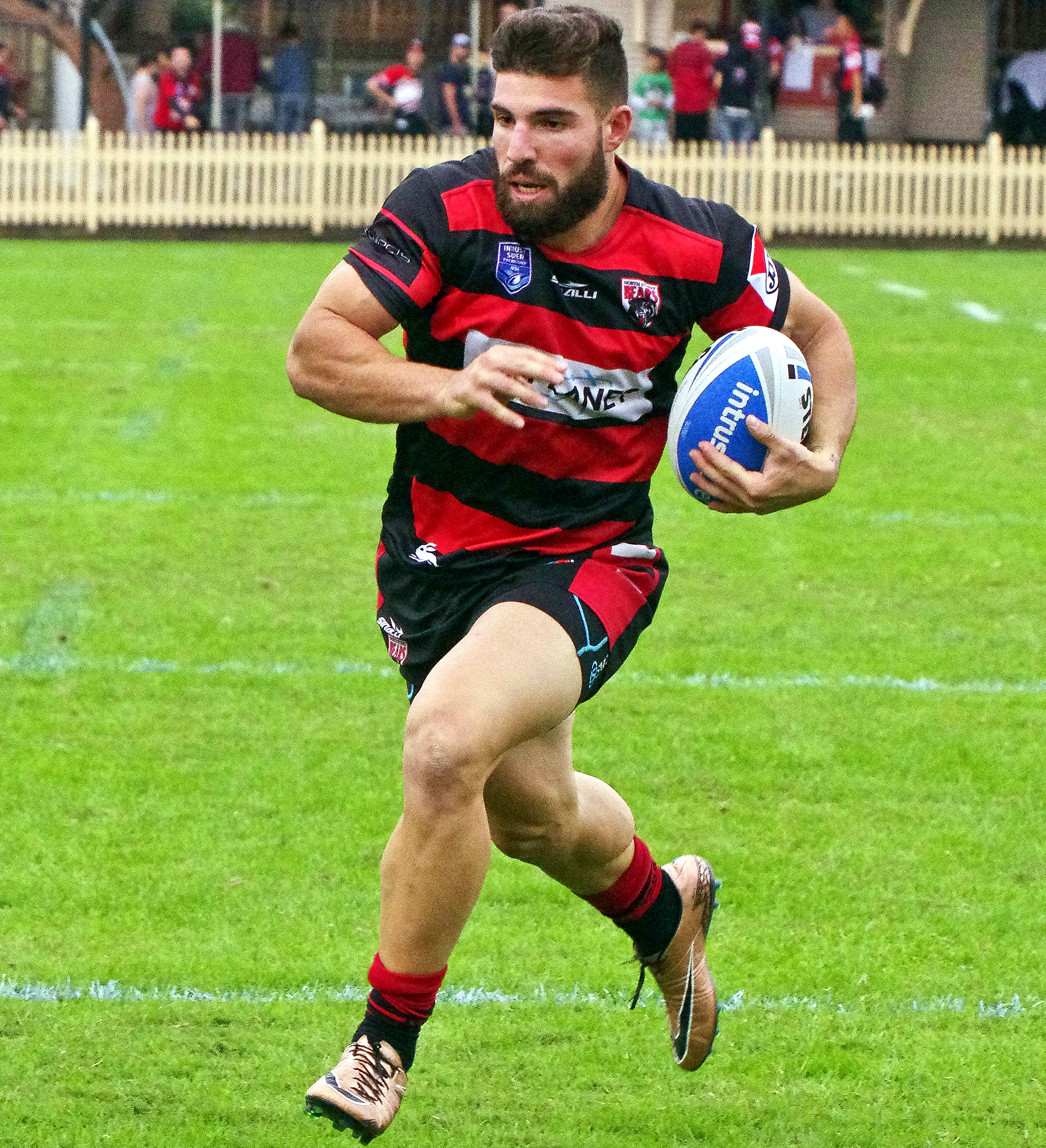
Miski playing for the North Sydney Bears in 2016

Miski joined the North Sydney Bears in the New South Wales Cup in 2016.

After two seasons with Norths, Miski left the club as he was not included in the 2018 Intrust Super Premiership NSW squad.

=== Wentworthville Magpies ===
In 2018, Miski joined the Wentworthville Magpies. On 22 September 2018, Miski scored a try for Wentworthville in their 38–4 victory over St Marys in the Ron Massey Cup grand final.

=== Manly Warringah Sea Eagles ===
==== 2019 ====
In 2019, Miski signed for the Blacktown Workers Sea Eagles, the feeder team for the Manly Warringah Sea Eagles after being released by Wentworthville. Miski made an appearance for Manly at Central Coast Stadium against the Sydney Roosters in the Community Cup scoring 3 tries in a trial match.

On 4 May 2019, Miski made his first grade debut on the wing for Manly against Canterbury-Bankstown at Brookvale Oval with Manly winning the game 18–10. Miski was called into the first grade team after winger Jorge Taufua pulled out with an ankle injury.

Miski spent most of 2019 playing for Manly's feeder club side the Blacktown Workers Sea Eagles. Miski finished the 2019 season as the club's top try scorer with 12 tries. Despite Miski's efforts on the field, Blacktown Workers finished with the wooden spoon coming last with only 6 wins all season.

==== 2020 ====
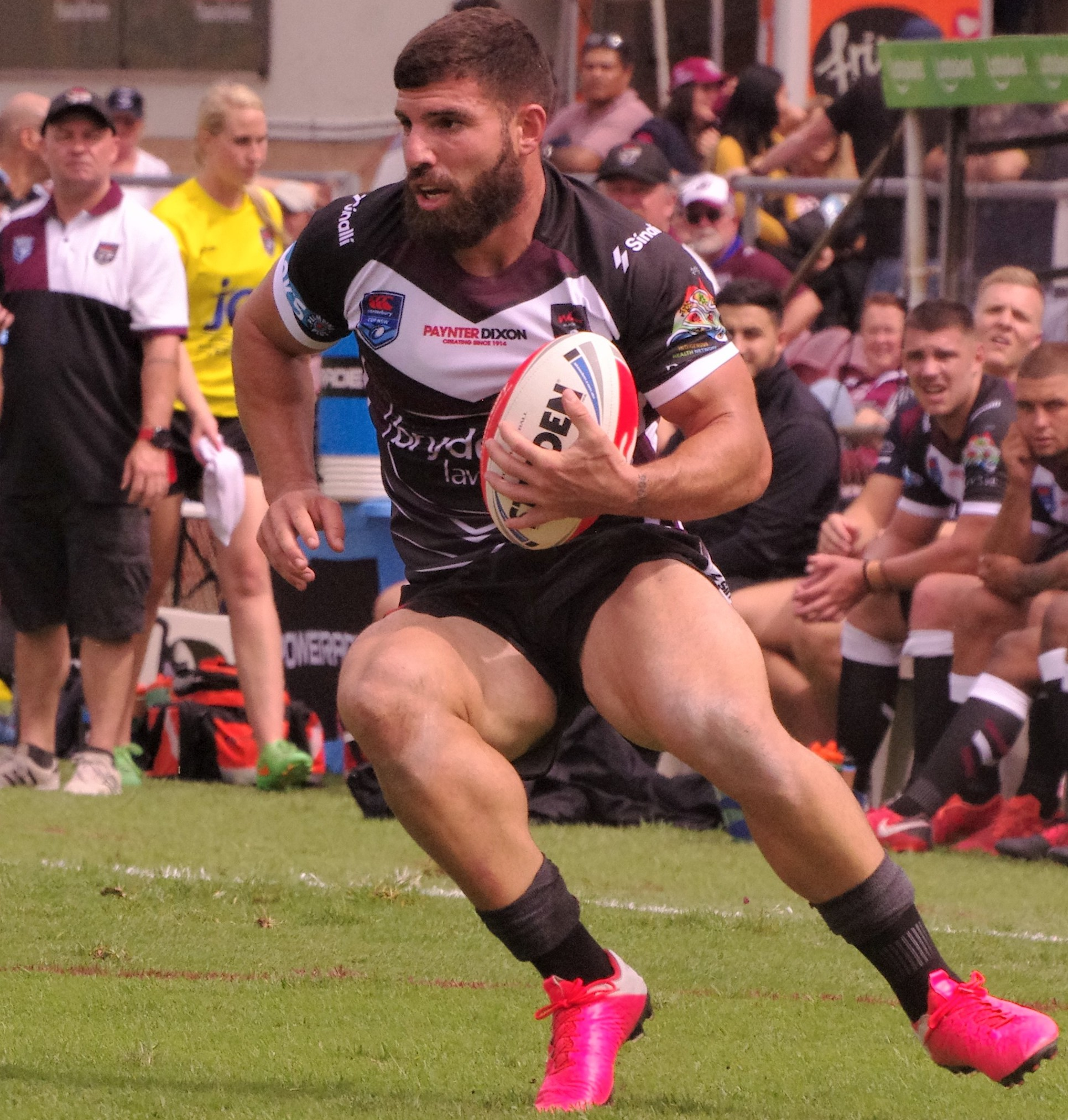
Miski playing for the Blacktown Workers Sea Eagles in 2020

In round 20 of the 2020 NRL season, Miski was called into the Manly-Warringah side for their final match of the year against the New Zealand Warriors. Miski scored two tries in a 40–28 loss at the Central Coast Stadium.

=== London Broncos ===
On 31 December 2020 it was announced that he had signed for the London Broncos in the Championship for the 2021 season.

=== Wigan Warriors ===
On 19 July 2021, it was announced that Miski would join Wigan in 2022 on a two-year contract (with an option for a third).

==== 2022 ====
In round 4 of the 2022 Super League season, Miski made his club debut for Wigan against Toulouse Olympique which ended in a 29–28 victory. In round 16 of the 2022 Super League season, Miski scored four tries for Wigan in a 40–6 win over Toulouse Olympique.

==== 2023 ====
In round 7 of the 2023 Super League season, Miski scored two tries for Wigan in their 34–6 victory over Leigh in the battle of the borough match. In round 13, Miski scored a try with one second remaining to take Wigan's game against Hull Kingston Rovers into extra-time which Wigan eventually won 26–22. In round 20, Miski scored a hat-trick in Wigan's 44–18 victory over Leigh. In round 21, Miski scored four tries as Wigan defeated an understrength Hull Kingston Rovers side 64–6. In round 23, Miski scored a hat-trick in Wigan's shock 34–0 victory over the league leaders Catalans Dragons. In round 26, Miski scored five tries in a 48–6 win over Castleford, taking him to 17 tries in his last seven games. On 14 October, Miski played in Wigan's 2023 Super League Grand Final victory over the Catalans Dragons.

==== 2024 ====
In January 2024, Miski signed a four-year contract extension with the club. On 24 February, Miski played in Wigan's 2024 World Club Challenge final victory over Penrith scoring a try in the first half. On 8 June, Miski played in Wigan's 2024 Challenge Cup final victory over Warrington. On 12 October, Miski played in Wigan's 9–2 2024 Super League grand final victory over Hull Kingston Rovers.

=== 2025 ===
On 9 October, Miski played in Wigan's 24-6 2025 Super League Grand Final loss against Hull Kingston Rovers.

== International career ==
Miski made his debut for Lebanon in their 2014 Hayne/Mannah Cup match against Fiji on 19 October 2014.

On 4 August 2017, he was named in Lebanon's 40-man training squad for the 2017 World Cup. Miski played on the wing for Lebanon during the 2017 World Cup playing in all four games. Before the third pool game against Australia, Miski garnered media attention for his almost mirror image look of Australian winger Josh Mansour. In the quarter final against Tonga, Miski scored two tries in Lebanon's narrow loss which ended 24–22.

At the 2021 Rugby League World Cup, Miski scored a try in the first group stage match against New Zealand in which Lebanon lost 34–12. In the final group stage game, Miski scored two tries against minnows Jamaica as Lebanon won the match 74–12.

== Honours ==
=== Wigan Warriors ===
- Super League
  - Winners (2): 2023, 2024
- League Leaders' Shield
  - Winners (2): 2023, 2024
- Challenge Cup
  - Winners (2): 2022, 2024
- World Club Challenge
  - Winners (1): 2024

=== Individual ===
- Wigan Warriors Player of the Year
  - Winners (1): 2023
