= Jake Wardle =

England international rugby league footballer

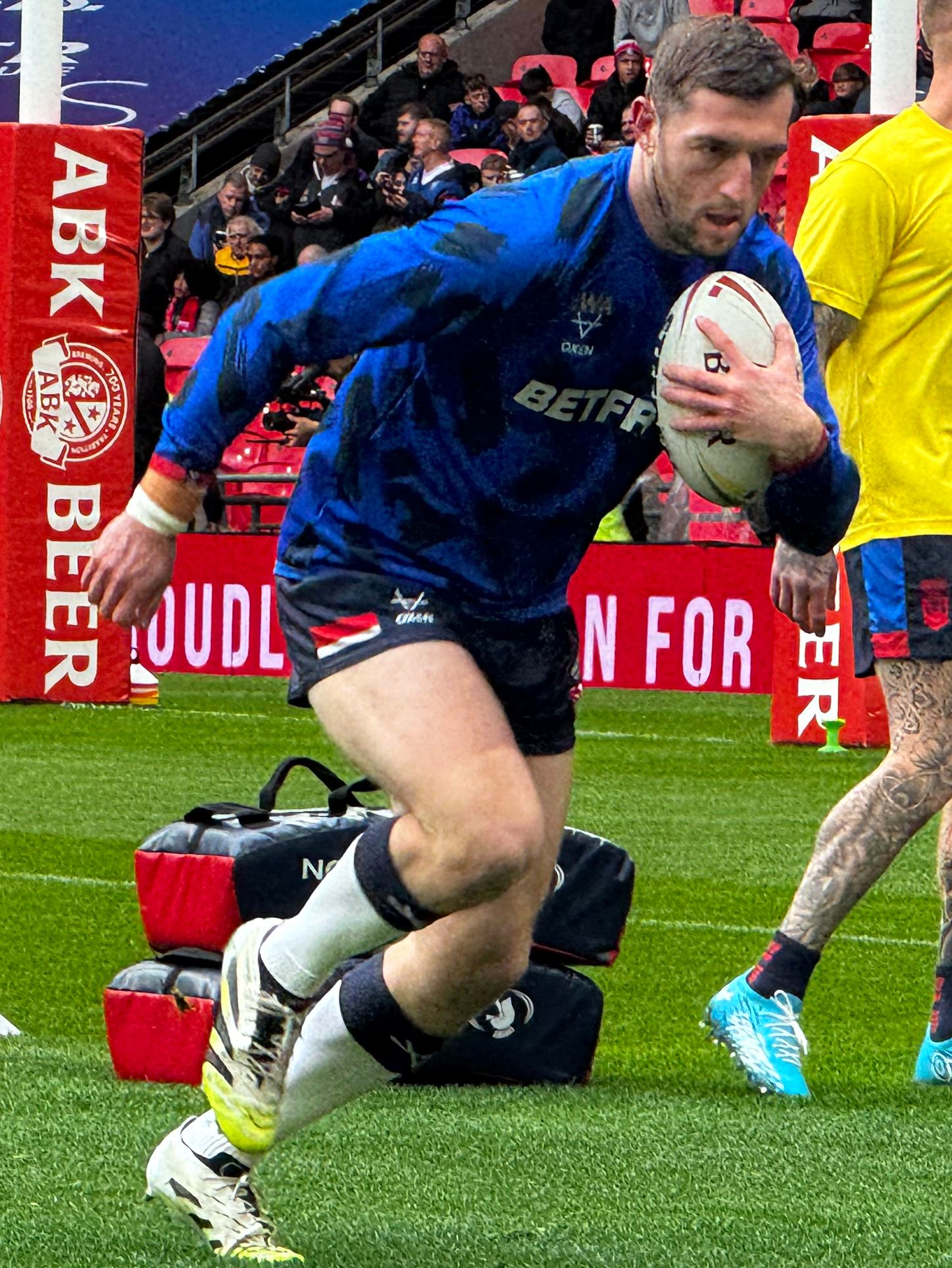

Personal information
- Full name: Jacob Wardle
- Born: 18 November 1998 (age 27) Halifax, West Yorkshire, England
- Height: 6 ft 3 in (1.90 m)
- Weight: 14 st 2 lb (90 kg)

Playing information
- Position: Centre, Wing
Club
Years	Team	Pld	T	G	FG	P
2018–22	Huddersfield Giants	64	22	10	0	108
2022(loan)	→ Warrington Wolves	11	6	0	0	24
2023–	Wigan Warriors	102	53	0	0	212
	Total	177	81	10	0	344
Representative
Years	Team	Pld	T	G	FG	P
2022–	England	3	1	0	0	4
2022	England Knights	1	0	0	0	0
- Source: As of 17 June 2026
- Relatives: Joe Wardle (brother)

Jake Wardle (born 18 November 1998) is an English professional rugby league footballer who plays as a centre for the Wigan Warriors in the Super League, and England and the England Knights at international level.

He previously played for the Huddersfield Giants in the Super League and has spent time on loan from Huddersfield at the Warrington Wolves in the top flight. Earlier in his career he played as a winger.

== Background ==
Wardle was born in Halifax, West Yorkshire, England

He is the younger brother of fellow former Giants player Joe Wardle.

== Playing career ==
=== Illingworth ARLFC ===
Jake began his Rugby League career at amateur club Illingworth ARLFC, before signing professional forms. During this time he played in the England Youth internationals against France.

=== Huddersfield Giants ===
Wardle is a product of Huddersfield's academy system, and made his first team début in May 2018, scoring two tries against Widnes Vikings.

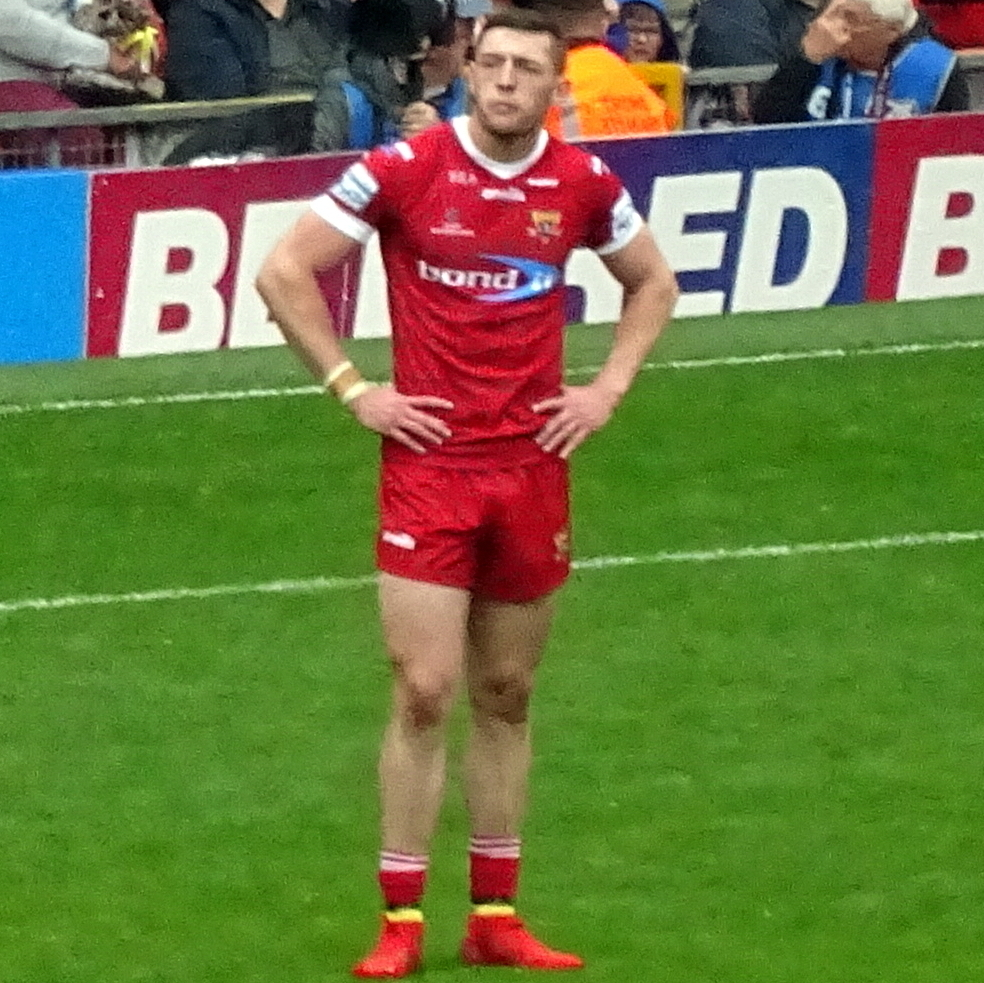
Wardle playing for Huddersfield in 2019

In 2020, Wardle signed a new contract to stay at Huddersfield until the end of the 2023 season.

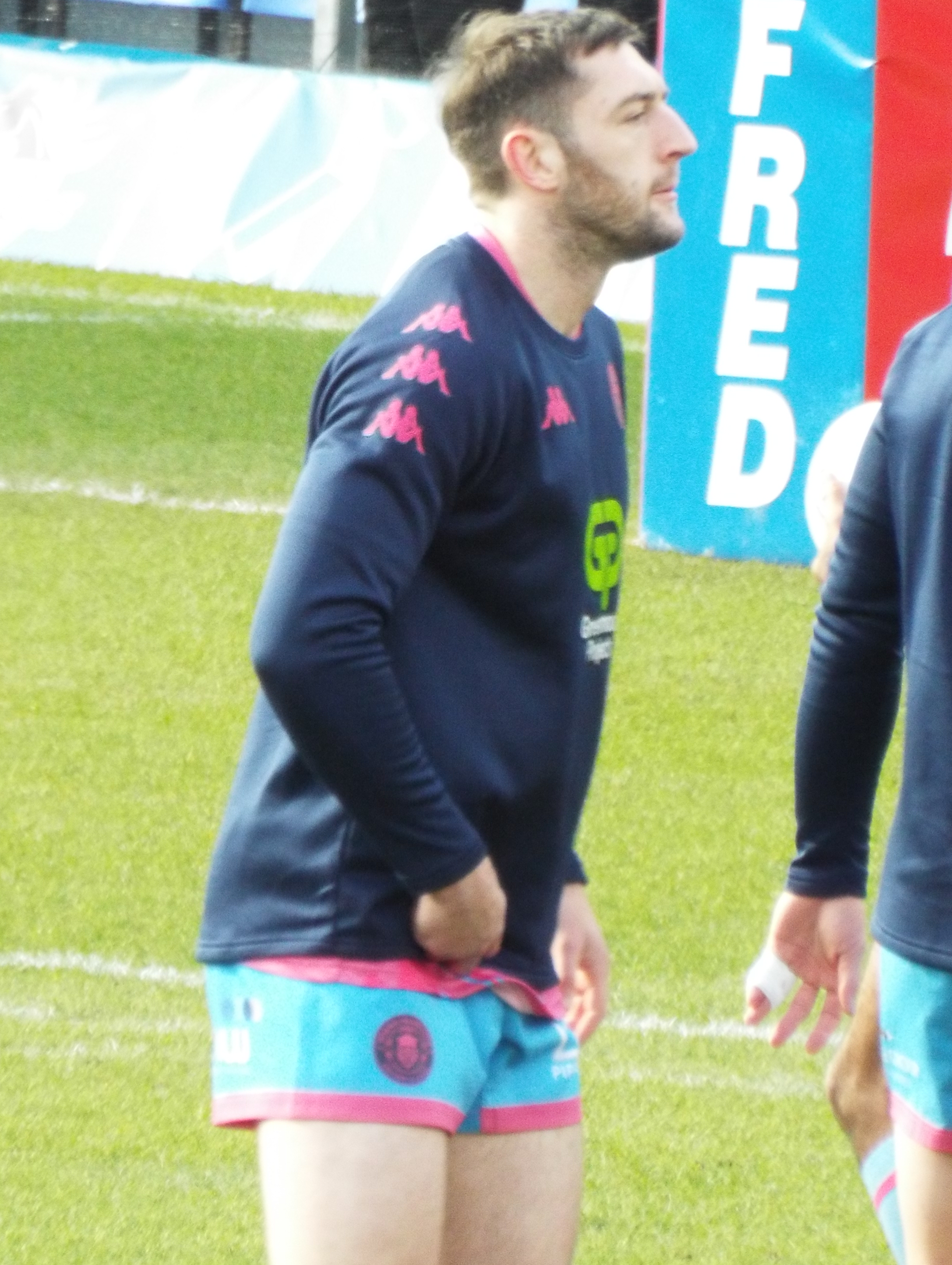
Wardle warming up for the Wigan Warriors in 2024

==== Warrington Wolves (loan) ====
On 25 June 2022 it was announced that he would join the Warrington Wolves for the remainder of the 2022 season.

=== Wigan Warriors ===
In October 2022 it was announced that Wardle had joined Wigan Warriors on a three-year deal.

In round 25 of the 2023 Super League season, Wardle scored a hat-trick in Wigan's 50-0 victory over Leeds. On 14 October 2023, Wardle played in Wigan's 2023 Super League Grand Final victory over the Catalans Dragons. Wardle was also awarded the Harry Sunderland Trophy as man of the match.

On 24 February 2024, Wardle played in Wigan's 2024 World Club Challenge final victory over Penrith scoring a controversial try in the second half. The try was sent to the video referee who stated that there was insufficient evidence to show whether the ball had crossed the line however on some replays it showed the ball was short of the line. On 27 March 2024, Wardle signed a five-year contract extension with Wigan to remain at the club until the end of 2029.

On 8 June, Wardle played in Wigan's 2024 Challenge Cup final victory over Warrington. Wardle retained his place in the Super League Dream Team for the 2024 Super League season. On 12 October 2024, he played in Wigan's 9-2 2024 Super League grand final victory over Hull Kingston Rovers. On 30 March 2025, Wardle scored a hat-trick in Wigan's 54-0 win over strugglers Salford.

On 9 October 2025, Wardle played in Wigan's 24-6 2025 Super League Grand Final loss against Hull Kingston Rovers.

On the opening game of the 2026 Super League season, Wardle suffered a medial collateral ligament injury ruling him out for three months in a match where he also scored helping Wigan to an opening round victory. On 30 May 2026, Wardle played in Wigan's 2026 Challenge Cup final victory against Hull Kingston Rovers.

== Honours ==
=== Wigan Warriors ===
- Super League
  - Winner (2): 2023, 2024
- League Leaders' Shield
  - Winner (3): 2023, 2024, 2026
- Challenge Cup
  - Winner (2): 2024, 2026
- World Club Challenge
  - Winner (1): 2024

=== Individual ===
- Super League Dream Team
  - Winner: 2023, 2024
- Harry Sunderland Trophy:
  - Winner: 2023
- Wigan Warriors Player of the Year
  - Winner: 2024
- Wigan Warriors Players' Player of the Year
  - Winner: 2024
