= 2024 World Club Challenge =

Rugby league competition

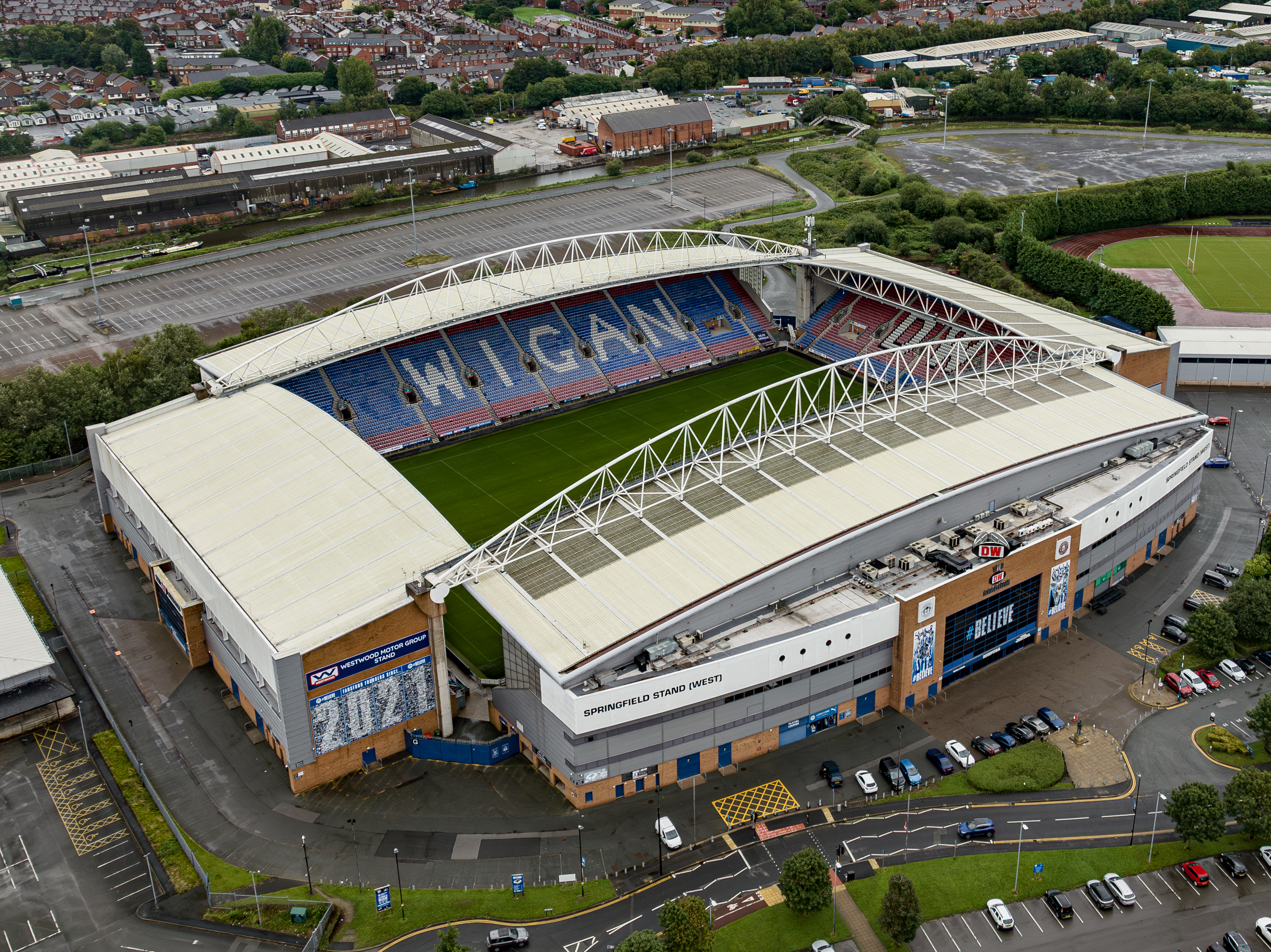
- The DW Stadium hosted the match
Wigan Warriors	Penrith Panthers
(Super League)	(NRL)
16	12
	1	2	Total
WIG	10	6	16
PEN	12	0	12
- Date: 24 February 2024
- Stadium: DW Stadium
- Location: Wigan, England
- Man of the Match: Bevan French
- God Save The King, Advance Australia Fair, and Jerusalem: Russell Watson
- Referee: Liam Moore
- Attendance: 24,091

Broadcast partners
- Broadcasters: (United Kingdom) BBC Two (United Kingdom) Sky Sports

The 2024 World Club Challenge was the 30th staging of the World Club Challenge, an annual rugby league match between the reigning champions of the Super League and the National Rugby League. The Wigan Warriors hosted the Penrith Panthers at DW Stadium on 24 February, 2024.

Wigan won the match 16–12, seeing the Warriors win their fifth World Club Challenge, equaling the Sydney Roosters with the most titles.

== Background ==
=== Wigan Warriors ===
The Wigan Warriors qualified by defeating the Catalans Dragons in the 2023 Super League Grand Final. They previously played in eight World Club Challenges and won four, including a 21–4 victory over Penrith in 1991. The Warriors' last appearance was in a 12-point defeat to the Sydney Roosters in the 2019 World Club Challenge.

=== Penrith Panthers ===
The Penrith Panthers defeated the Brisbane Broncos in the 2023 NRL Grand Final - their third consecutive premiership - to qualify for their second (Note: The 2021 World Club Challenge did not occur due to the COVID-19 pandemic) consecutive World Club Challenge and their fifth overall. They lost the 2023 edition to St Helens in golden point, which also acted as one of their fixtures in the inaugural NRL Pre-season Challenge. As the 2024 edition was played in England, the Panthers did not participate in the Pre-season Challenge, which began the weekend prior.

== Pre-match ==
The Penrith Panthers' UK training base ahead of the match was at Manchester City's Etihad Campus.

=== Ticketing ===
Ticketing was organising by Wigan Warriors, as they were hosting the match. Tickets went on sale on 21 December 2023 and started at £28 for adults and £16 for junior. 10,000 were sold in the first 24 hours.

On 22 January, Wigan announced the match was a sellout event.

=== Entertainment ===
Heather Small headlined the prematch entertainment with a fan village being open in Wigan throughout the day, while Russell Watson performed the national anthems.

== Match ==
=== Details ===
24 February 2024
20:00 GMT

Wigan Warriors	16–12	Penrith Panthers
Tries: 3 Miski 8'; Leeming 32'; Wardle 52'; Goals: 2 Smith 2/3 33', 54'	1st: 10–12; 2nd: 6–0; Report	Tries: 2 Cleary 26'; Edwards 38'; Goals: 2 Cleary 2/2 27', 39'

DW Stadium, Wigan
Attendance: 24,091
Referee: Liam Moore (England)
Touch judges: Jonnie Roberts (England), Rich Thompson (England)
Player of the Match: Bevan French

Wigan Warriors		Position	Penrith Panthers	
1	Jai Field	Fullback	1	Dylan Edwards 39'
2	Abbas Miski 9'	Wing	2	Sunia Turuva (substituted off) 66'
3	Adam Keighran	Centre	21	Izack Tago
4	Jake Wardle 52'	Centre	4	Taylan May
5	Liam Marshall	Wing	5	Brian To'o
6	Bevan French	Stand-off	6	Jack Cole
7	Harry Smith 34', 54'	Scrum-half	7	Nathan Cleary 27', 28', 40'
14	Mike Cooper (substituted off) 18', (substituted on) 67'	Prop	8	Moses Leota (substituted off) 23', (substituted on) 64'
9	Brad O'Neill (substituted off) 28'	Hooker	9	Mitch Kenny
10	Liam Byrne (substituted off) 22', (substituted on) 63', (substituted off) 74'	Prop	10	James Fisher-Harris (substituted off) 30', (substituted on) 60'
11	Willie Isa	Second-row	11	Luke Garner (substituted off) 48', (substituted on) 69'
12	Liam Farrell	Second-row	12	Liam Martin
13	Kaide Ellis	Loose forward	13	Isaah Yeo
15	Patrick Mago (substituted on) 22', (substituted off) 48', (substituted on) 58', (substituted off) 63'	Interchange	14	Tyrone Peachey (substituted on) 66'
17	Kruise Leeming (substituted on) 28', 33'	Interchange	15	Lindsay Smith (substituted on) 23', (substituted off) 69'
19	Tyler Dupree (substituted on) 18', (substituted off) 58', (substituted on) 74'	Interchange	16	Liam Henry (substituted on) 48', (substituted off) 64'
20	Harvie Hill (substituted on) 48', (substituted off) 67'	Interchange	17	Matt Eisenhuth (substituted on) 30', (substituted off) 60'
	(England) Matt Peet	Head coach		(Australia) Ivan Cleary

=== Summary ===
First Half

The first chance of the game went to Penrith, as Willie Isa knocked the ball on, inside his own 20 meter area with 25 seconds of the game played. However, Penrith couldn't take the advantage, and Wigan held on.

With 8 minutes played, Wigan got the first Try of the game, as Bevan French found a pass out wide for Abbas Miski to touch down in the corner. Referee Liam Moore needed confirmation from the video referee. On-field decision: TRY - and confirmation from the video referee awarded the try. Harry Smith unable to add the extras. WIG 4–0 PEN.

With half time approaching, both teams looked to add points, and on 27 minutes, Penrith scored a try, as Nathan Cleary's high kick on the last, was fumbled by Miski, with Cleary touching down under the sticks. Cleary converting his own try. WIG 4–6 PEN

Wigan then retook the lead, on 34 minutes, this time through Kruise Leeming, as Willie Isa managed to offload the ball, for Leeming to touch down next to the posts. Smith successful with the conversion. WIG 10–6 PEN

Wigan looked to be heading into half time with a narrow lead, but a set restart on the last tackle gave Penrith 6 more tackles, 20 meters out, and Dylan Edwards went over for the Panthers’ 2nd try. and after a lengthy review from the video referee, the try was given. Cleary again successful with the conversion.

Half time: Wigan 10–12 Penrith.

Second Half

The first score of the 2nd half came on 53 minutes, as Jake Wardle looked to have been held up, just metres short of the line on the last tackle. However, referee Liam Moore thought Wardle had scored, but couldn't be certain, so he went to the video referee, with the on-field line call as a try. Video referee Chris Kendall then viewed all available angles, and replays showed that Wardle was indeed short of the line, but slow motion replays appeared to show wardle being dragged back over the line, and somehow grounding the ball. after a lengthy review, he decided that he didn't have sufficient evidence to overturn the line call of try, therefore the try was awarded. Smith successful with the conversion.

WIG 16-12 PEN

With time running out for the panthers, Cleary broke through a gap in the Wigan defence, and found a pass out wide for Taylan May for what seemed a try, but Jai Field with a last gasp tackle on May saw him dragged into touch and Wigan held on.

With 8 minutes left to play, Penrith knocked the ball on, on the halfway line, and Wigan got the ball back. Then, Harry Smith saw an opening, and kicked the ball through, and Bevan French chased the ball down, and touched down under the posts, to win the game for Wigan, but it was ruled out for offside, as the video referee deemed French's foot was in front of Smith as he kicked the ball.

With less than a minute to play, Penrith were pushing for a late try, and with less than 30 seconds to play, the referee called for a set restart, and Taylan May looked to have scored a last gasp try for Penrith in the corner, but the referee sent it to the video ref, with a line call of no try, and after viewing all angles, the video referee said that he couldn't overturn the decision, as there was insufficient evidence to overrule the line call, and Wigan won the match, to win their first world club challenge since 2017, and record equalling 5th title.

=== Statistics ===
Statistic	Wigan Warriors	Penrith Panthers
Tries	3	2
Conversions	2	2
Penalty goals (attempts)	0 (0)	0 (0)
Field goals (attempts)	0 (0)	0 (0)
Possession
Possession	47%	53%
Total sets	38	36
Completed sets	33	26
Completion rate	86%	72%
Attacking
All runs	129	143
All run metres	1,258	1,335
Line breaks	2	2
Offloads	6	9
Defending
Kick metres	429	194
40/20	0	0
Tackles	325	341
Missed tackles	30	23
Goal line dropouts	0	0
Try saves	0	0
Discipline
Penalties conceded	4	5
Errors	5	10
Send offs	0	0
Sin bins	0	0
Reference: NRL Match Centre

Wigan Warriors:

- Most runs: 14 -
  - Liam Marshall
- Most running metres: 152 -
  - Abbas Miski
- Most line breaks: 2 -
  - Abbas Miski
- Most tackles: 47 -
  - Brad O'Neill
- Most missed tackles: 8 -
  - Willie Isa
- Most errors: 2 -
  - Abbas Miski
  - Jake Wardle

Penrith Panthers:

- Most runs: 20 -
  - Dylan Edwards
- Most running metres: 208 -
  - Dylan Edwards
- Most line breaks: 1 -
  - Dylan Edwards
  - Mitch Kenny
- Most tackles: 56 -
  - Mitch Kenny
- Most missed tackles: 3 -
  - Moses Leota
  - Mitch Kenny
  - James Fisher-Harris
- Most errors: 2 -
  - Taylan May
  - Nathan Cleary
  - Moses Leota

== Post match ==
Wigan celebrated their victory during their opening home league fixture, against Huddersfield Giants, with a trophy parade and player walk through from the club's fan village at the Robin Park Arena (their reserve stadium and training ground) to the DW Stadium. Match tickets were also reduced to £5.

Wigan's victory marked the first time Super League sides had back to back victories in the competition without both matches being played in the UK. This reignited the NRL vs Super League debate, with Penrith head coach Ivan Cleary admitted that the gap between the two competitions had narrowed and that the top Super League clubs were at NRL level.

== Controversy ==
The match attracted controversy regarding several refereeing decisions that influenced the final 16–12 result in Wigan's favour. A pivotal second-half try was awarded to Wigan centre Jake Wardle in the 52nd minute, with replays suggesting he grounded the ball before reaching the line and possibly involving a double movement. On-field referee Liam Moore referred it as a try despite claims he was not in a position to definitively confirm the try, and video referee Chris Kendall upheld the decision due to a lack of conclusive evidence to overturn it, as views were obscured by players' bodies. This try gave Wigan the lead. On the final play, Panthers centre Taylan May appeared to score a potential equalising try in the corner but was denied when the on-field "no try" call stood due to inconclusive evidence from the video review. The decisions drew criticism, with some describing Wardle's try as one of the most contentious in rugby league history and highlighting perceived inconsistencies in refereeing; Penrith winger Brian To'o implied post-match that Wardle knew he had not grounded it legally.
