= Liam Marshall =

England international rugby league footballer

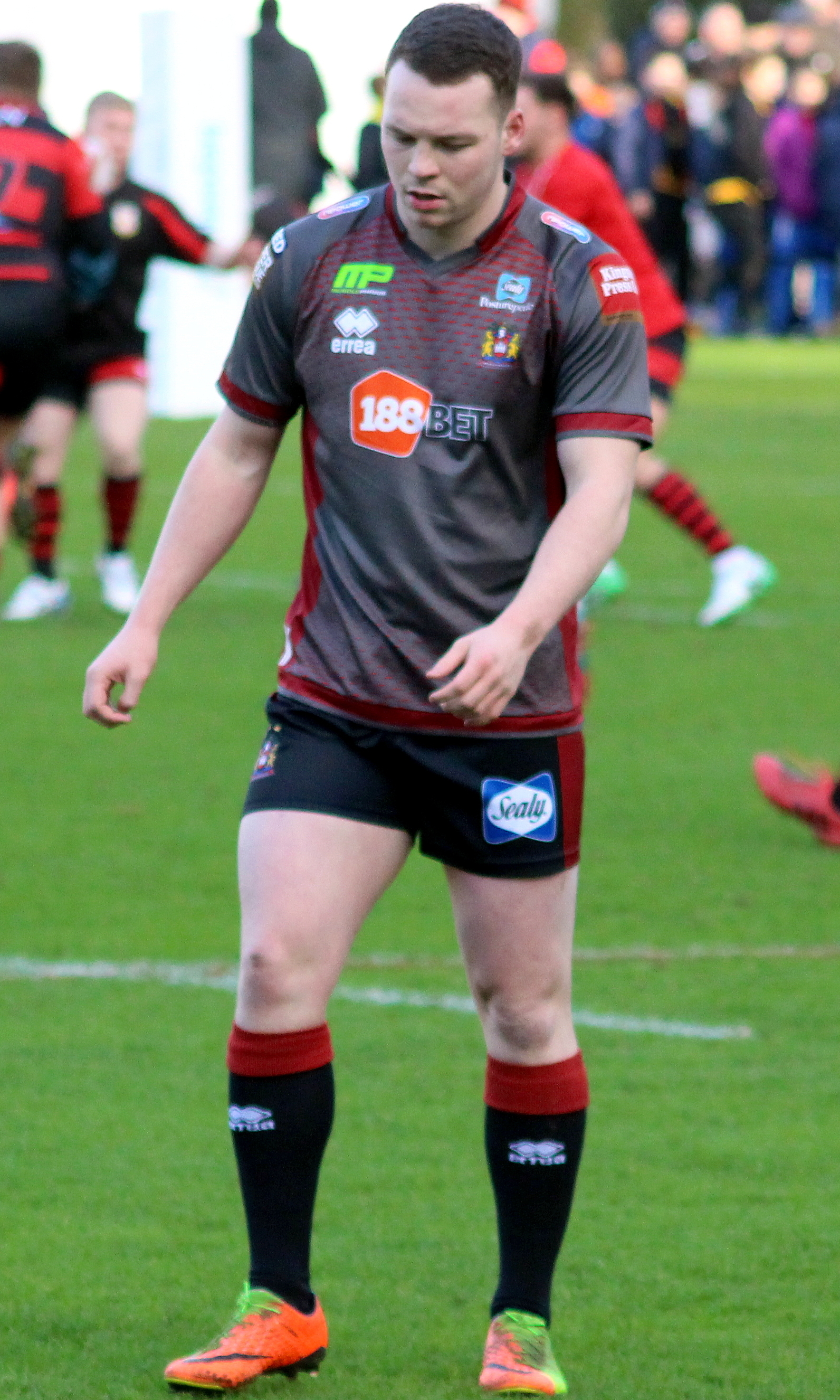

Personal information
- Full name: Liam Marshall
- Born: 9 May 1996 (age 30) Standish, Wigan, Greater Manchester, England
- Height: 5 ft 10 in (1.79 m)
- Weight: 13 st 8 lb (86 kg)

Playing information
- Position: Wing
Club
Years	Team	Pld	T	G	FG	P
2016–	Wigan Warriors	170	142	10	0	616
2016(loan)	→ Swinton Lions	22	20	0	0	80
	Total	192	162	10	0	696
Representative
Years	Team	Pld	T	G	FG	P
2024–	England	1	1	0	0	4
- Source: As of 2 November 2024

Liam Marshall (born 9 May 1996) is an English rugby league footballer who plays as a winger for the Wigan Warriors in the Super League and England.

He has spent time on loan from Wigan at the Swinton Lions in the Championship.

== Background ==
Marshall was born in Lancashire, England.

== Playing career ==
=== Wigan Warriors ===
==== Swinton Lions (loan) ====
Marshall spent the 2016 season on loan at Championship side Swinton Lions. He made a number of impressive performances at the club, most notably scoring four tries in a 38–35 win against Halifax, and a hat trick in a 40–38 win against Sheffield Eagles. He finished the year as the club's top try scorer with 20 tries in 22 appearances.

==== Return to parent club ====
He made his first team début on 3 March 2017, against Leigh. Marshall also scored four tries on just his second game for the Warriors in a 38–16 win at the Warrington Wolves on 9 March 2017. He played in the 2017 Challenge Cup Final defeat by Hull F.C. at Wembley Stadium.

Marshall made 22 appearances for Wigan in the 2018 season and scored 17 tries, but his season was cut short by an anterior cruciate ligament injury in August 2018. He missed the club's 2018 Super League Grand Final victory over Warrington Wolves.

Marshall played 23 games for Wigan in the 2019 season and scored 16 tries including Wigan's shock loss to Salford in the semi-final.

Marshall made 10 appearances for Wigan in the 2020 season, scoring six tries, but was ruled out for the rest of the season after suffering another serious knee injury in a match against Castleford Tigers on 29 August 2020. As a result, he missed the club's Grand Final loss against St Helens

In round 1 of the 2022 Super League season, Marshall scored two tries in a 24-10 victory over Hull Kingston Rovers. On 28 May 2022, Marshall scored the winning try for Wigan in their 2022 Challenge Cup Final victory over Huddersfield. In round 21, Marshall scored a hat-trick in Wigan's 46-4 victory over Hull Kingston Rovers.

In round 2 of the 2023 Super League season, Marshall scored four tries for Wigan in a 60–0 victory over Wakefield Trinity, a match in which he also scored his 100th career try for the club. The following week, Marshall scored a hat-trick in Wigan's 36–0 victory over Castleford. On 14 October 2023, Marshall played in Wigan's 2023 Super League Grand Final victory over the Catalans Dragons scoring the only try of the match.

In round 1 of the 2024 Super League season, Marshall scored two tries in Wigan's 32-4 victory over Castleford. On 24 February 2024, Marshall played in Wigan's 2024 World Club Challenge final victory over Penrith. On 1 March 2024, Marshall scored a hat-trick in Wigan's 30-16 victory over Huddersfield. On 8 June 2024, Marshall played in Wigan's 2024 Challenge Cup final victory over Warrington. Marshall signed a new four-year contract with Wigan in August 2024. Marshall made the Super League Dream Team for the 2024 Super League season. On 12 October 2024, Marshall played in Wigan's 9-2 2024 Super League grand final victory over Hull Kingston Rovers.

In 2025, Marshall kept his place in the Super League Dream Team. On 9 October 2025, Marshall played in Wigan's 24-6 2025 Super League Grand Final loss against Hull Kingston Rovers.

== International ==
On 2 Nov 2024 he made his début for England in the 34-16 win over Samoa, also scoring his 1st try.

== Honours ==
=== Wigan Warriors ===
- Super League
  - Winners (3): 2018, 2023, 2024
- League Leaders' Shield
  - Winners (4): 2020, 2023, 2024, 2026
- Challenge Cup
  - Winners (2): 2022, 2024
- World Club Challenge
  - Winners (1): 2024

=== Individual ===
- Super League Dream Team
  - Winners (2): 2024, 2025
- Rookie of the Year:
  - Winners (1): 2017
