= Logan Astley =

English rugby league footballer

Personal information
- Full name: Logan Astley
- Born: 18 May 2003 (age 22) Billinge, Merseyside, England
- Height: 5 ft 11 in (1.80 m)
- Weight: 13 st 3 lb (84 kg)

Playing information

Rugby league
- Position: Scrum-half, Stand-off
Club
Years	Team	Pld	T	G	FG	P
2022–23	Wigan Warriors	2	0	0	0	0
2022(loan)	→ Oldham RLFC	7	10	0	0	40
2023(loan)	→ Featherstone Rovers	3	0	0	0	0
2024–25	Oldham RLFC	20	13	11	0	70
	Total	32	23	11	0	110

Rugby union
Club
Years	Team	Pld	T	G	FG	P
2025–	Wigan RUFC	0	0	0	0	0
- Source: As of 24 September 2025

Logan Astley (born 18 May 2003) is an English professional rugby league footballer who last played as a scrum-half and stand-off for Oldham RLFC in the RFL Championship, and now plays rugby union for Wigan RUFC.

== Playing career ==
=== Wigan Warriors ===
In 2022 Astley made his Super League début for Wigan against the Huddersfield Giants.

=== Oldham RLFC ===
On 19 October 2023, it was reported that he had signed a two-year deal to join Oldham RLFC.

On 10 July 2025 it was reported that he had left Oldham RLFC with immediate effect.

=== Wigan RUFC ===
On 24 September 2025 it was reported that he had switched codes to play rugby union for Wigan RUFC
