= Patrick Mago =

New Zealand rugby league footballer

Patty Mago
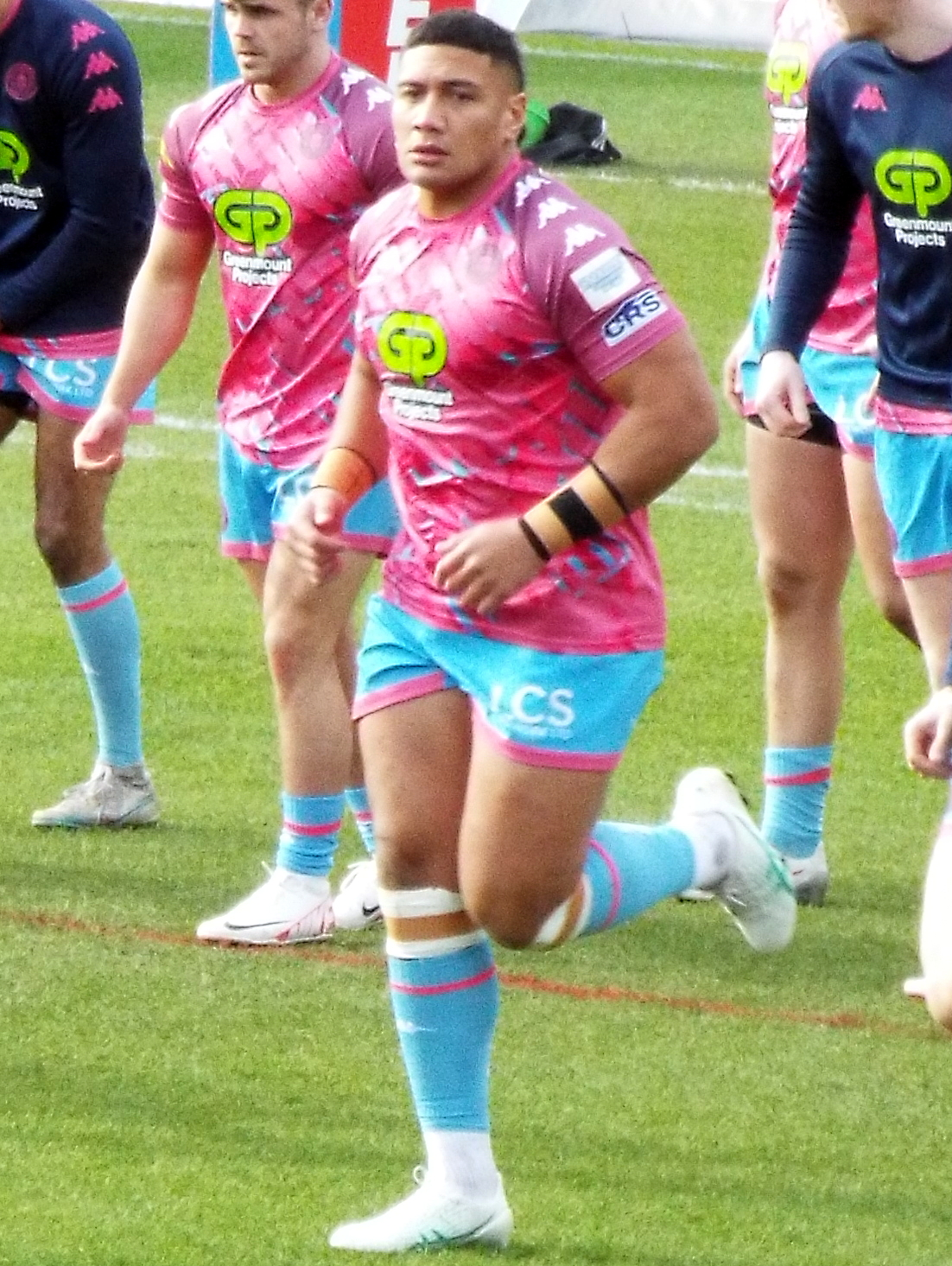

Personal information
- Full name: Patrick Mago
- Born: 4 December 1994 (age 31) Otara, Auckland, New Zealand
- Height: 6 ft 2 in (1.87 m)
- Weight: 17 st 11 lb (113 kg)

Playing information
- Position: Prop
Club
Years	Team	Pld	T	G	FG	P
2017	North Qld Cowboys	2	0	0	0	0
2018–19	Brisbane Broncos	12	0	0	0	0
2020–21	South Sydney	23	0	0	0	0
2022–	Wigan Warriors	150	10	0	0	40
	Total	187	10	0	0	40
Representative
Years	Team	Pld	T	G	FG	P
2018	Queensland Residents	1	0	0	0	0
- Source: As of 8 January 2024

Patrick Mago (born 4 December 1994) is a professional rugby league footballer who plays as a prop for the Wigan Warriors in Super League.

He previously played for the South Sydney Rabbitohs, North Queensland Cowboys, and the Brisbane Broncos in the National Rugby League in Australia.

== Background ==
Mago was born in Otara, New Zealand, and is of Samoan descent and moved to Australia at a young age. He grew up in Logan City, Queensland and attended Marsden State High School.

He played his junior football for the Souths Logan Magpies before signing with the Canberra Raiders.

== Playing career ==
=== Early career ===
In 2012, Mago moved to Canberra and played for Canberra SG Ball Cup side. In 2013, he moved up to their NYC side. At the end of that season he represented the Junior Kangaroos, scoring twice in the side's 38-26 win over the Junior Kiwis.

In 2014, Mago captained the Raiders' NYC side and was chosen to represent the Queensland under-20 and Junior Kangaroos sides.

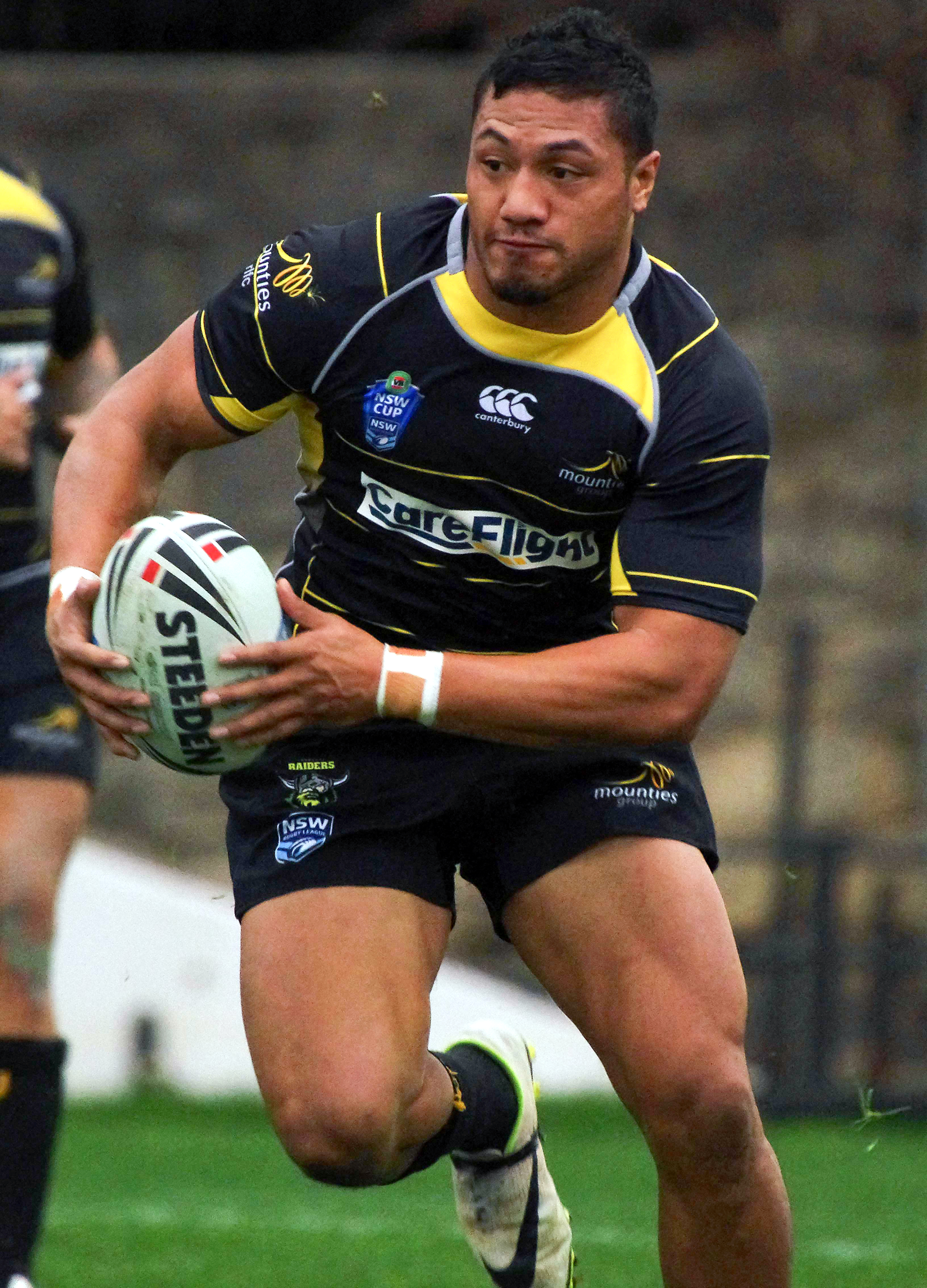
Mago playing for the Mounties in 2015

In 2015, Mago moved into Canberra's NRL squad, but spent the season playing for their feeder club, Mounties, in the New South Wales Cup. After being released at the end of the season, Mago spent the 2016 pre-season with North Queensland on a train and trial contract and eventually earned a two-year NRL contract with the club. He spent the season playing for the North Queensland feeder club, the Mackay Cutters in the Queensland Cup.

=== North Queensland Cowboys ===
==== 2017 ====
After starting the season with the Northern Pride, Mago made his first grade debut for North Queensland in their Round 23 game against Penrith.

=== Brisbane Broncos ===
==== 2018 ====
Ahead of 2018, he signed with the Cowboys' Queensland rivals, the Brisbane Broncos. Mago made 12 appearances for Brisbane in the 2018 NRL season including the club's elimination final loss against St. George at Suncorp Stadium.

=== South Sydney Rabbitohs ===
==== 2020 ====
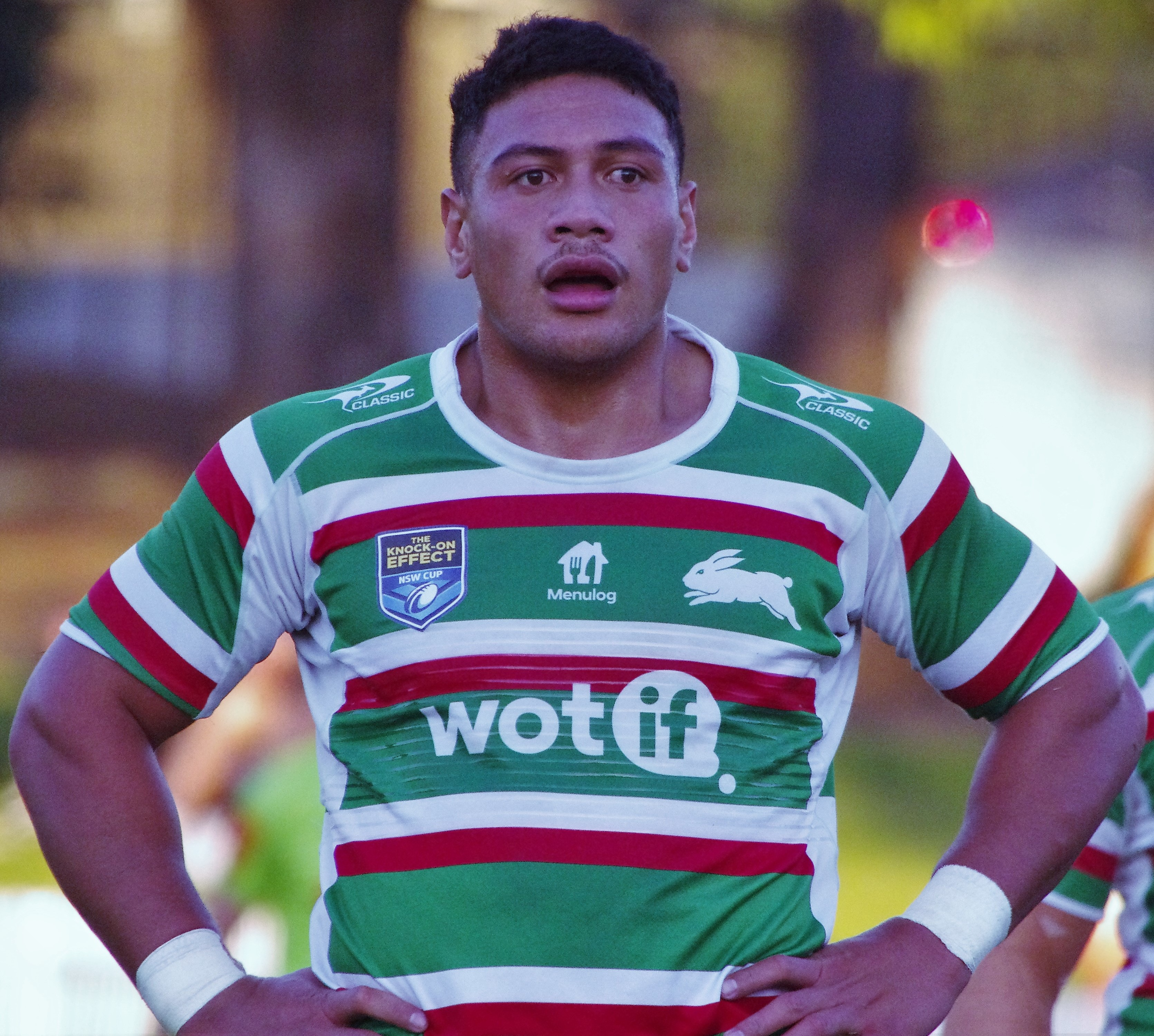
Mago playing for the South Sydney Rabbitohs in 2021

Mago joined South Sydney and made 12 appearances for the club in the 2020 NRL season.

=== Wigan Warriors ===
==== 2021 ====
On 15 July 2021, he had signed for Wigan in the Super League on a three-year deal for the 2022 season.

==== 2022 ====
On 28 May 2022, Mago played for Wigan in their Challenge Cup final victory over Huddersfield. Mago made 31 appearances for Wigan throughout the 2022 Super League season including the clubs upset semi-final loss against Leeds.

==== 2023 ====
On 14 October 2023, Mago played in Wigan's 2023 Super League Grand Final victory over the Catalans Dragons.

==== 2024 ====
On 24 February, Mago played in Wigan's 2024 World Club Challenge final victory over Penrith. On 8 June, Mago played in Wigan's 2024 Challenge Cup final victory over Warrington from the interchange bench. On 6 September, Mago played just 14 minutes in Wigan's victory over Hull KR and won man of the match having been credited with turning the game's momentum and ultimately seeing success for Wigan in a decisive game for the League Leaders Shield. On 12 October, Mago played in Wigan's 9-2 2024 Super League grand final victory over Hull Kingston Rovers.

==== 2025 ====
On 9 October, Mago played in Wigan's 24-6 2025 Super League Grand Final loss against Hull Kingston Rovers.

==== 2026 ====
On 30 May, Mago played in Wigan's 2026 Challenge Cup final victory against Hull Kingston Rovers. At the end of the season, he signed a new two-year contract with the option of an additional year.

== Honours ==
=== Wigan Warriors ===
- Super League
  - Winner (2): 2023, 2024
- League Leaders' Shield
  - Winner (3): 2023, 2024, 2026
- Challenge Cup
  - Winner (3): 2022, 2024, 2026
- World Club Challenge
  - Winner (1): 2024

== Statistics ==
=== NRL / Super League ===
Season	Team	Matches	T	G	GK %	F/G	Pts
2017	North Queensland Cowboys	2	0	0	—	0	0
2018	Brisbane Broncos	12	0	0	—	0	0
2020	South Sydney Rabbitohs	12					
2021	South Sydney Rabbitohs	11					
2022	Wigan Warriors	31	1				4
2023	Wigan Warriors	27	2				
2024	Wigan Warriors	34	3				12
2025	Wigan Warriors	26	1				4
2026	Wigan Warriors	33	2				8
Career totals		187	10	0	—	0	40
