= 2023 Super League Grand Final =

Rugby league championship match

| Wigan Warriors | Catalans Dragons |
|---|---|
| 10 | 2 |
| | 1 | 2 | Total |
|---|---|---|---|
| WIG | 2 | 8 | 10 |
| CAT | 2 | 0 | 2 |
- Date: 14 October 2023
- Stadium: Old Trafford
- Location: Manchester
- Harry Sunderland Trophy: Jake Wardle
- Jerusalem: Laura Wright
- Referee: Liam Moore
- Attendance: 58,137

Broadcast partners
- Broadcasters: (United Kingdom) Sky Sports (Australia) Fox League

The 2023 Super League Grand Final was the 26th official grand final, and championship-deciding rugby league game of Super League XXVIII. The match was contested between Wigan Warriors and Catalans Dragons, at Old Trafford.

St Helens were the defending champions, having won 4 consecutive titles in 2019, 2020, 2021, and 2022, but they were eliminated in the Semi-final, losing 6–12 to Catalans Dragons in a repeat of the 2021 Final, which St Helens won 12–10.

== Background ==
| Pos | Team | Pld | W | D | L | PF | PA | PD | Points |
|---|---|---|---|---|---|---|---|---|---|
| 1 | Wigan Warriors | 27 | 20 | 0 | 7 | 722 | 360 | +362 | 40 |
| 2 | Catalans Dragons | 27 | 20 | 0 | 7 | 722 | 420 | +302 | 40 |

== Route to the final ==
=== Catalans Dragons ===
| Round | Opposition | Score |
|---|---|---|
| Semi-final | St Helens (H) | 12–6 |
Key: (H) = Home venue; (A) = Away venue; (N) = Neutral venue.

Catalans ended the regular season in 2nd place, thus earning them a bye to the semi-finals, where they would play the highest ranked winner of the eliminators, which was St Helens. Catalans thought they had scored the first try of the game on 18 minutes, as Tom Johnstone touched down in the corner, but the referee decided the on field decision was NO TRY, with the video referee confirming this, as Johnstone was deemed to have pushed Jonny Lomax off the ball, while chasing the kick. St Helens then got possession back, with Lewis Dodd putting a high kick up. As the ball bounced, Tom Johnstone somehow fumbled it 20 metres out, attempting to pick the ball up. On 28 minutes, Catalans were awarded a penalty, as Sione Mata'utia was penalised for a high tackle on Sam Tomkins, with Catalans opting to kick for goal. Adam Keighran successfully kicked the goal, to give Catalans a 2–0 lead with 10 minutes until half time. The first TRY of the game, came on 50 minutes, as Catalans knocked on, inside their own 40-metre line, and Will Hopoate touched down next to the posts. Mark Percival successful with the conversion, and St Helens lead 6–2. Catalans were awarded another penalty on 64 minutes, as Moses Mbye was penalised for a high tackle. Despite being 4 points down, Catalans opted to go for the 2 points, to which Keighran was successful again, and Catalans were back to within 2 points. With 8 minutes of the match remaining, things got worse for St Helens, as Matty Lees was sent to the sin bin, for what seemed to be holding down on Tom Johnstone, but replays show that his leg was trapped in the tackle. Keighran again opted to kick for goal, to which he was successful, and both teams were level at 6–6. On 75 minutes, Saints knocked the ball on, near the halfway line to give Catalans possession 40 metres out. 2 minutes later, Tomkins looked like he was going for a drop goal attempt, but decided to run with the ball. From the resulting kick through, saints had to clear the ball for a goal line drop out. With 3 minutes remaining, Tomkins attempted to kick a drop goal, but his effort was short, and saints got the ball back, only for Mata'utia to drop the ball 20 metres out. As the game looked to be heading to extra time, Sam Tomkins scored the winning try, with less than 1 minute remaining, and hand saints their first play-off defeat since 2018. Final score: Catalans 12–6 St Helens

=== Wigan Warriors ===
| Round | Opposition | Score |
|---|---|---|
| Semi-final | Hull KR (H) | 42–12 |
Key: (H) = Home venue; (A) = Away venue; (N) = Neutral venue.

Wigan finished the regular season in as league leaders, thus earning a bye to the semi-final. They played the lowest ranked winner from the eliminators, which was Hull KR.

Wigan got off to a fast start, as 3 tries in 10 minutes from Liam Marshall (2), and Jai Field, gave Wigan an 18–0 lead.

21 minutes on the clock, and Hull KR got their first try of the game, with Elliott Minchella touching down next to the posts.

Half time: Wigan 18–6 Hull KR.

3 minutes into the 2nd half, Marshall got his hat trick, as Bevan French put up a high kick for Marshall to touch down, and Wigan lead 24–6. 5 minutes later, Toby King crossed for Wigan, to put them even further ahead. Smith successful with the conversion (5/5).

On 54 minutes, Field got his 2nd try of the game, with Smith again successful with the conversion (6/6). 3 minutes later, Abbas Miski scored his 28th try of the season – Smith successful with the conversion.

With 3 minutes remaining, Jez Litten scored a consolation try for KR, but it wasn't enough.

Final score: Wigan 42–12 Hull KR

== Match details ==
14 October 2023
18:00 BST (UTC+01)

| Wigan Warriors | 10–2 | Catalans Dragons |
| Try: Marshall 53'; Con: Smith 54'; Pen: Smith 27', 64' | Report | Pen: Keighran 38' |

Old Trafford, Manchester
Attendance: 58,137
Referee: Liam Moore
Player of the match: (England) Jake Wardle (Wigan Warriors)

| Wigan Warriors | | Position | Catalans Dragons | |
|---|---|---|---|---|
| 1 | Jai Field | Fullback | 29 | Sam Tomkins |
| 23 | Abbas Miski | Wing | 2 | Tom Davies; (yellow card) 44' |
| 3 | Toby King | Centre | 21 | Matt Ikuvalu (substituted off) 65' |
| 4 | Jake Wardle | Centre | 3 | Adam Keighran (yellow card) 19'; 36' |
| 5 | Liam Marshall; 53' | Wing | 24 | Tom Johnstone |
| 2 | Bevan French | Stand-off | 6 | Tyrone May |
| 7 | Harry Smith; 27', 54', 64' | Scrum-half | 7 | Mitchell Pearce (substituted off) 67' |
| 34 | Tyler Dupree (substituted off) 18', (substituted on) 54', (substituted off) 68' | Prop | 8 | Mike McMeeken |
| 22 | Brad O'Neill (substituted off) 32', (substituted on) 75' | Hooker | 9 | Michael McIlorum |
| 15 | Kaide Ellis (substituted off) 37', (substituted on) 60', (substituted off) 68' | Prop | 22 | Siosiua Taukeiaho (substituted off) 23', (substituted on) 50' |
| 17 | Kai Pearce-Paul (substituted off) 60', (substituted on) 68' | Second-row | 11 | Matt Whitley |
| 12 | Liam Farrell | Second-row | 12 | Paul Séguier (substituted off) 67' |
| 13 | Morgan Smithies | Loose forward | 13 | Benjamin Garcia (substituted off) 27', (substituted on) 58' |
| 9 | Sam Powell (substituted on) 32', (substituted off) 75' | Interchange | 1 | Arthur Mourgue (substituted on) 67' |
| 11 | Willie Isa (substituted on) 28' | Interchange | 10 | Julian Bousquet (substituted on) 23', (substituted off) 58', (substituted on) 67' |
| 16 | Ethan Havard (substituted on) 18', (substituted off) 28' | Interchange | 16 | Romain Navarrete (substituted on) 27', (substituted off) 50' |
| 20 | Patrick Mago (substituted on) 37', (substituted off) 54' | Interchange | 26 | Manu Ma'u (substituted on) 65' |
| | (England) Matt Peet | Head coach | | (England); Steve McNamara |

=== First Half ===
The first real chance of the first half came on 5 minutes, as Sam Tomkins put a kick into the corner, for Tom Johnstone to collect, but Wigan managed to defend it, and turned the ball over.

On 19 minutes, Catalans' Adam Keighran was shown a yellow card, for a dangerous tackle on Kai Pearce-Paul, and 2 minutes later, Liam Farrell almost got the first try of the game, but he was stopped just short of the line on the last tackle.

Catalans were penalised again on 25 minutes for a high tackle on Liam Marshall, and from the resulting penalty, Harry Smith opted to go for goal, to which he was successful, and Wigan lead 2–0 with less than 15 minutes to go until half time.

With 5 minutes of the first half remaining, Catalans were awarded a penalty, as Wigan were caught offside, with Adam Keighran opting to kick for goal, to which he was successful, and the scores were level at 2–2.

First half ends: Wigan 2–2 Catalans

=== Second Half ===
4 minutes into the 2nd half, Tom Davies was shown a yellow card, for pulling back Liam Marshall without the ball.

On 49 minutes, Wigan thought they had scored the first try of the game through Bevan French, but it was disallowed, for a forward pass, but 2 minutes later, Wigan scored again through Marshall, and this time it was awarded. Smith successful with the conversion, and Wigan lead 8–2, with just over 30 minutes to play.

On 62 minutes, Wigan were awarded another penalty for a high tackle, with Smith again, opting to kick for goal, to which he was successful, and Wigan now lead 10–2.

Final score: Wigan 10–2 Catalans.
