= 2026 Warrington Wolves season =

English rugby league team season

Warrington Wolves 2026 season
- 2026 Super League season Rank: 3rd
- Play-off result: Runners-up
- Challenge Cup: Semi-finals
- 2026 record: Wins: 23; draws: 0; losses: 9
- Points scored: For: 726; against: 465

Team information
- Chairman: Stuart Middleton
- Head Coach: Sam Burgess
- Captain: George Williams
- Stadium: Halliwell Jones Stadium
- Avg. attendance: 10,388
- High attendance: 15,064; St Helens, 13 February
- Low attendance: 8,354; Catalans Dragons, 25 June

Top scorers
- Tries: Matty Ashton (22)
- Goals: Ewan Irwin (83)
- Points: Ewan Irwin (190)
Home colours	Away colours
← 2025	List of seasons	2027 →

The 2026 season was the Warrington Wolves' 31st consecutive season playing in England's top division of rugby league. They competed in the 2026 Super League season and the 2026 Challenge Cup.

== Preseason friendlies ==
Date and time	Versus	H/A	Venue	Result	Score	Tries	Goals	Attendance	Report
9 January; 20:00	Widnes Vikings	H	Halliwell Jones Stadium	W	50–12 (Note: Fixture ended a few minutes before full time due to crowd trouble, including pitch invasions which briefly stopped play; a teenage Warrington fan was later hospitalised after fighting outside the stadium.)	Jo. Thewlis (3), Irwin, Thomas, Hayes, Hartill, E. Smith	Sneyd (4/6), Irwin (2/2), Hayes (1/1)	4,083	
30 January; 15:00	Leigh Leopards	H	Halliwell Jones Stadium	W	16–12	King, Ja. Thewlis, Philbin	Sneyd (1/2), Irwin (1/1)	5,553	

== Super League ==
From 2026, the Super League expanded to 14 teams, with Toulouse Olympique and York Knights being promoted from the RFL Championship via the IMG Grading system. At a meeting of all twelve Super League teams at the Headingley Rugby Stadium on 28 July 2025 to vote on the expansion proposal, Warrington were one of nine teams to vote in favour of expanding the league.

=== Fixtures ===
Warrington Wolves' Super League 2026 fixtures were released on 27 November 2025:

Date and Time	Round	Versus	H/A	Venue	Result	Score	Tries	Goals	Attendance	TV	Pos.	Report
13 February; 20:00	Round 1	St Helens	H	Halliwell Jones Stadium	W	24–14	King, Taylor-Wray, Hopoate, Jo. Thewlis	Sneyd (3/4 + 1 pen.)	15,064	Sky Sports Main Event	4th	
20 February; 20:00	Round 2	Hull KR	A	Craven Park	N/A	P–P (Note: Fixture postponed and rearranged to 18 August due to Hull KR's World Club Challenge commitments.)				N/A	5th (Note: With a game in hand.)	
28 February; 17:30	Round 3	Wakefield Trinity	H	Halliwell Jones Stadium	W	27–16	Sipley, Hopoate, J. Smith, King	Sneyd (3/4 + 2 pen.); Drop-goals Sneyd	10,094	BBC Two; Sky Sports +	5th	
6 March; 20:00	Round 4	York Knights	A	York Community Stadium	W	38–30	Stone (2), Jo. Thewlis (2), Taylor-Wray, Williams, Currie	Sneyd (5/7)	6,210	Sky Sports +	3rd	
21 March; 15:00	Round 5	Castleford Tigers	H	Halliwell Jones Stadium	W	72–6	Tanginoa (4), Ashton (3), Currie (2), Hopoate, Stone, Harrison	Irwin (10/12 + 2 pen.)	9,342	BBC Two; Sky Sports +	2nd	
29 March; 17:30	Round 6	Leeds Rhinos	A	Headingley Rugby Stadium	L	22–26	J. Smith (2), Jo. Thewlis, King	Irwin (2/4 + 1 pen.)	16,102	Sky Sports Main Event	2nd	
4 April; 15,00	Round 7 (Rivals Round)	Leigh Leopards	H	Halliwell Jones Stadium	W	42–6	Ashton (2), J. Smith, Bentley, Philbin, Williams, Powell	Sneyd (6/7 + 1 pen.)	11,026	Sky Sports +	1st	
18 April; 18:00 (BST)	Round 8	Catalans Dragons	A	Stade Gilbert Brutus	L	22–38	Ja. Thewlis, Williams, Jo. Thewlis, Wood	Sneyd (3/4)	9,525	Sky Sports +	4th	
24 April; 20:00	Round 9	Wigan Warriors	H	Halliwell Jones Stadium	W	23–6	Jo. Thewlis (2), Hopoate (2)	Sneyd (2/4 + 1 pen.); Drop-goals Sneyd	13,218	Sky Sports + Main	3rd	
2 May; 20:00	Round 10	Huddersfield Giants	A	Kirklees Stadium	W	34–4	Hopoate, King, J. Smith, Stone, Philbin, Ashton	Sneyd (5/6)	4,012	Sky Sports +	3rd	
16 May; 17:00 (BST)	Round 11	Toulouse Olympique	A	Stade Michel Bendichou (Note: Fixture moved from Stade Ernest Wallon due to stadium unavailability.)	W	24–16	King (2), J. Smith, Wood	Sneyd (3/4 + 1 pen.)	4,634	Sky Sports	3rd	
24 May; 15:00	Round 12	Bradford Bulls	H	Halliwell Jones Stadium	W	26–12	Jo. Thewlis, Thomas, Hopoate, Irwin, Ashton	Irwin (3/7)	9,306	Sky Sports +	2nd	
5 June; 20:00	Round 13	Hull F.C.	H	Halliwell Jones Stadium	W	12–4	J. Smith (2)	Sneyd (2/2)	8,815	Sky Sports +	2nd	
11 June; 20:00	Round 14	St Helens	A	BrewDog Stadium	W	18–6	Hopoate, J. Smith, Irwin	Irwin (3/3)	11,590	Sky Sports + Main	2nd	
18 June; 20:00	Round 15	Leeds Rhinos	H	Halliwell Jones Stadium	L	6–34	Ashton	Irwin (0/1 + 1 pen.)	10,083	Sky Sports + Main	2nd	
25 June; 20:00	Round 16	Catalans Dragons	H	Halliwell Jones Stadium	W	18–16	Ashton, Hopoate, Bentley	Irwin (3/3)	8,354	Sky Sports +	2nd	
4 July; 17:30	Round 17 (Magic Weekend)	Leigh Leopards	N	Hill Dickinson Stadium	L	6–24	Sneyd	Irwin (1/1)	34,539	Sky Sports + Main	3rd	
10 July; 20:00	Round 18	Wigan Warriors	A	Brick Community Stadium	L	18–30	Hopoate, Irwin, Ashton	Irwin (2/3 + 1 pen.)	16,621	Sky Sports +	4th	
18 July; 15:00	Round 19	Hull KR	H	Halliwell Jones Stadium	W	34–12	Ashton (2), Webster, Harrison, Walker, Philbin	Irwin (4/6 + 1 pen.)	10,025	Sky Sports + Main	4th	
25 July; 17:30	Round 20 (Rivals Round Reversed)	Leigh Leopards	A	Leigh Sports Village	L	12–28	Sipley, Hopoate	Irwin (2/2)	9,145	Sky Sports +	4th	
1 August; 15:00	Round 21	Castleford Tigers	A	Wheldon Road	W	48–18	Ashton (2), Holroyd, King, Sipley, Harrison, Hayes, Currie	Irwin (8/8)	8,802	Sky Sports +	4th	
8 August; 18:30	Round 22	Bradford Bulls	A	Odsal Stadium	W	42–4	Ashton (2), Hopoate, King, Philbin, Crowther, Irwin	Irwin (7/7)	8,650	Sky Sports +	4th	
13 August; 20:00 (Note: Fixture rearranged from 15 August to accommodate rescheduled Hull KR Round 2 fixture.)	Round 23	York Knights	H	Halliwell Jones Stadium	W	30–10	Jo. Thewlis, Stone, Irwin, Walker, Lindop	Irwin (3/5 + 2 pen.)	9,015	Sky Sports +	3rd	
18 August; 20:00	Round 2	Hull KR	A	Craven Park	W	34–28	Hopoate (2), Bentley, Sipley, Byrne, Williams	Irwin (4/6 + 1 pen.)	11,785	Sky Sports Main Event	3rd	
23 August; 15:00	Round 24	Huddersfield Giants	H	Halliwell Jones Stadium	W	34–24	Walker, Bentley, Powell, Williams, Lindop, Ashton	Hayes (4/6 + 1 pen.)	10,034	Sky Sports +	3rd	
29 August; 17:30	Round 25	Hull F.C.	A	MKM Stadium	W	16–14	Hayes, Ashton, Jo. Thewlis	Williams (1/3 + 1 pen.)	12,255	Sky Sports +	3rd	
5 September; 15:00	Round 26	Wakefield Trinity	A	Belle Vue	L	18–25	J. Smith, Ashton, Hopoate	Hayes (1/3 + 2 pen.)	9,057	BBC Two; Sky Sports +	3rd	
11 September; 20:00	Round 27	Toulouse Olympique	H	Halliwell Jones Stadium	W	26–14	Lindop (2), Webster, Wood, J. Smith	Hayes (4/5)	10,667	Sky Sports +	3rd	

=== Table ===
Pos	Team	Pld	W	D	L	PF	PA	PD	Pts	Qualification
1	Wigan Warriors (L)	27	22	0	5	851	439	+412	44	Advance to Semi-finals
2	Leeds Rhinos	27	20	0	7	904	426	+478	40	Advance to Semi-finals
3	Warrington Wolves (Y)	27	20	0	7	726	465	+261	40	Advance to Eliminators
4	Wakefield Trinity (C)	27	19	0	8	709	486	+223	38	Advance to Eliminators
5	Leigh Leopards	27	17	0	10	644	497	+147	34	Advance to Eliminators
6	Hull Kingston Rovers	27	16	0	11	748	503	+245	32	Advance to Eliminators
7	St Helens	27	15	0	12	636	614	+22	30	
8	Toulouse Olympique	27	10	0	17	578	704	−126	20	
9	Catalans Dragons	27	10	0	17	537	802	−265	20	
10	York Knights	27	9	0	18	545	791	−246	18	
11	Hull FC	27	8	0	19	488	597	−109	16	
12	Huddersfield Giants	27	8	0	19	509	765	−256	16	
13	Castleford Tigers	27	8	0	19	464	866	−402	16	
14	Bradford Bulls	27	7	0	20	468	852	−384	14	

Updated to match(es) played on 12 September 2026. Source:
(C) Champions; (L) League Leaders' Shield Winners; (Y) Runners up

=== Play-offs ===
Date and time	Round	Versus	H/A	Venue	Result	Score	Tries	Goals	Attendance	TV	Report
19 September; 17:30	Eliminators	Hull KR	H	Halliwell Jones Stadium	W	35–12	Ashton (3), Currie, Hopoate, King	Irwin (4/6 + 1 pen.); Drop-goals Williams	11,073	BBC Two; Sky Sports + Main	
25 September; 20:00	Semi-finals	Leeds Rhinos	A	Headingley Rugby Stadium	W	14–12	Bentley, Yates	Irwin (2/2 + 1 pen.)	16,627	Sky Sports Main Event	
3 October; 18:00	Grand Final	Wakefield Trinity	N	Old Trafford	L	10–23	Lindop (2)	Irwin (1/2)	71,728	Sky Sports Main Event	

== Challenge Cup ==
Warrington Wolves were first drawn on 12 January to play the Sheffield Eagles in Round 3, following Sheffield's 18–6 defeat of Whitehaven R.L.F.C. in their Round 2 fixture on 24 January. The fixture was originally set to be played away at Sheffield's Steel City Stadium, however both teams later agreed to swap the venue to the Halliwell Jones Stadium.

Following their victory against Sheffield, Warrington beat the Goole Vikings at home 78–10 in Round 4 in a match originally meant to be played at the Victoria Pleasure Grounds, entering them into the quarter-finals, then after beating the Leigh Leopards 24–10 at home, were drawn to play 2025 winners Hull KR in the semi-finals. The Warrington Wolves were ultimately knocked out of the 2026 Challenge Cup by Hull KR in this fixture.

Date and time	Round	Versus	H/A	Venue	Result	Score	Tries	Goals	Attendance	TV	Report
6 February; 20:00	Round 3	Sheffield Eagles	H	Halliwell Jones Stadium	W	34–6	Taylor-Wray (2), King, Jo. Thewlis, Hopoate, Rhodes	Sneyd (5/6)	2,908	Not televised	
14 March; 14:00	Round 4	Goole Vikings	H	Halliwell Jones Stadium	W	72–10	Ja. Thewlis (2), J. Smith (2), Jo. Thewlis, Wood, Crowther, Walker, Harrison, Webster, Hartill, Hayes, Irwin	Irwin (13/13)	3,195	Not televised	
11 April; 17:30	Quarter-finals	Leigh Leopards	H	Halliwell Jones Stadium	W	24–10	Currie (2), Walker, King	Sneyd (3/4 + 1 pen.)	7,759	SuperLeague+	
10 May; 16:00	Semi-finals	Hull KR	N	Eco-Power Stadium	L	12–32	Currie, Stone	Sneyd (2/2)	12,054	BBC Two	

== Transfers ==
=== Gains ===
Player	Club	Contract	Date
(Niue) Toafofoa Sipley	Manly Warringah Sea Eagles	2 years	August 2025
(Ireland) Liam Byrne	Wigan Warriors	2 years	September 2025
(Australia) Albert Hopoate	Canberra Raiders	2 years	October 2025
(Ireland) James Bentley	Leeds Rhinos	1 year	October 2025
(Australia) Josh Smith	Brisbane Tigers	2 years	October 2025
(Malta) Sam Stone	Salford Red Devils	2 years	October 2025
(Australia) Kelepi Tanginoa	Hull KR	2 years	November 2025

=== Losses ===
Player	Club	Contract	Date
(Australia) Paul Vaughan	York Knights	2 years	July 2025
(England) Zac Bardsley-Rowe	TBC		September 2025
(Australia) Lachlan Fitzgibbon	TBC		September 2025
(England) Stefan Ratchford	N/A	Retirement	September 2025
(England) Nolan Tupaea	TBC		September 2025
(England) Alfie Johnson	Halifax Panthers	1 year	October 2025
(Papua New Guinea) Daniel Russell	Bradford Bulls	1 year	November 2025
(Nigeria) Daniel Okoro	Halifax Panthers	1 year	November 2025
(Papua New Guinea) Rodrick Tai	Central Queensland Capras	1 year	November 2025
(England) Tom Whitehead	Hull KR	3 years	November 2025
(England) Lucas Green	Keighley Cougars	1 year	December 2025
(Australia) Matthew Dufty	South Sydney Rabbitohs	1 year (Note: Contract only for the 2026 New South Wales Cup.)	January 2026
(England) Flynn Holden	Hull KR	2 1/2 years	June 2026
(England) Oliver Leyland	Huddersfield Giants	End of season	August 2026
(England) Marc Sneyd	N/A		August 2026

==== Loans out ====
Player	Club	Loan period	Date
(England) Charlie McKler	Rochdale Hornets		March 2026
(England) Tom McKinney	Oldham R.L.F.C.	One month	March 2026
(Ireland) Jake Thewlis	Castleford Tigers	One month	March 2026
(England) Zack Gardner	Salford RLFC	One week	April 2026
(England) Ben Hartill	North Wales Crusaders	One week	April 2026
(England) Leon Hayes	Salford RLFC	One week	April 2026
(England) Flynn Holden	Goole Vikings	One week	April 2026
(England) Tom McKinney	Salford RLFC	One week	April 2026
(England) Ewan Smith	Goole Vikings	One week	April 2026
(England) Max Wood	Oldham R.L.F.C.	One month	April 2026
(England) Leon Hayes	Widnes Vikings	One month	April 2026
(England) Max Wood	Hull F.C.	One month	July 2026 (Note: Wood initially left for Hull F.C. on a month's loan in June 2026, however he was recalled after two fixtures due to Toafofoa Sipley being injured.)

== Squad ==
2026 Warrington Wolves squad
First team squad			Coaching staff
1 (England) Cai Taylor-Wray – FB; 2 (Ireland) Josh Thewlis – WG, FB; 3 (Ireland) Toby King – CE; 4 (Australia) Albert Hopoate – WG, CE; 5 (England) Matty Ashton – WG, FB; 6 (England) George Williams (c) – SO, SH (gk); 8 (Australia) Luke Yates – LF, PR; 9 (England) Danny Walker – HK; 10 (England) James Harrison – SR, PR, LF; 11 (England) Adam Holroyd – SR; 12 (Malta) Sam Stone – SR; 13 (England) Ben Currie (vc) – SR, LF, CE	14 (England) Sam Powell – HK, SH, SO; 15 (Niue) Toafofoa Sipley – PR; 16 (Ireland) Liam Byrne – PR; 17 (England) Jordan Crowther – LF, HK; 18 (England) Ewan Irwin – SH, SO (gk); 19 (England) Leon Hayes – SH, HK (gk); 20 (Ireland) James Bentley – SR, LF, HK; 21 (Wales) Luke Thomas – PR; 22 (Ireland) Joe Philbin – LF, SR, PR; 23 (England) Arron Lindop – WG, CE; 25 (England) Max Wood – PR; 26 (Australia) Josh Smith – WG, CE	27 (Ireland) Jake Thewlis – WG; 29 (England) Zack Gardner – CE; 30 (England) Tom McKinney – PR; 31 (England) Ben Hartill – HK; 32 (England) Ewan Smith – SR, CE; 33 (Ireland) Tommy Rhodes – SH; 34 (Australia) Kelepi Tanginoa – PR, SR; 35 (England) Lachlan Webster – WG; 36 (England) Charlie McKler – PR	Head coach: (England) Sam Burgess; Assistant coaches: (England) Steve McNamara; (Ireland) Richard Marshall; Legend: (c) Captain(s); (vc) Vice-captain(s); (red card) = suspended; = injured; (gk) = Goal kicker; Updated: 3 October 2026; Source(s): Squad numbers revealed for 2026
