= 2022 Warrington Wolves season =

- Super League XXVII Rank: 11th
- Challenge Cup: Sixth round
- 2022 record: Wins: 9; draws: 0; losses: 19
- Points scored: For: 580; against: 680

Team information
- Chairman: Stuart Middleton
- Head Coach: Daryl Powell
- Captain: Jack Hughes
- Stadium: Halliwell Jones Stadium
- Avg. attendance: 8,852
- High attendance: 10,476 v St Helens
- Low attendance: 2,627 v Wakefield

Top scorers
- Tries: Matty Ashton (13)
- Goals: Stefan Ratchford (64)
- Points: Stefan Ratchford (140)
← 2021	List of seasons	2023 →

In 2022, Warrington Wolves played in their 27th consecutive season in the Super League and their 19th season at the Halliwell Jones Stadium. Warrington were coached by Daryl Powell and they competed in both Super League XXVII and the 2022 Challenge Cup.

== Season review ==
On 12 February, Warrington began their Super League campaign with a 22–20 away win at Leeds Rhinos which was followed with wins over Castleford Tigers and Toulouse Olympique. The run of wins ended when their first loss came against Catalans Dragons in Round 4 and they failed to record consecutive wins for the rest of the season. Warrington were knocked out of the Challenge Cup at the end of March after losing to a Wakefield Trinity side that had also beaten them in the league in the previous match. After a win over Huddersfield Giants in April, Warrington went on a run of five losses before defeating Hull F.C. 4–0 in late June. A 32–18 victory over Toulouse in mid-August helped Warrington to maintain their gap over the bottom of the table team. Warrington finished their season with 32–14 win over Salford Red Devils.

== Results ==
=== Pre-season friendlies ===
W Win L Loss

Pre-season results
Date	Versus	H/A	Venue	Result	Score	Tries	Goals	Attendance	Report
29 January	Wigan Warriors	H	Halliwell Jones Stadium	L	6–14				(Note: Stefan Ratchford Testimonial)
4 February	Salford Red Devils	H	Halliwell Jones Stadium	W	30–14				(Note: Lee Mossop Testimonial)

=== Super League ===
==== Table ====
Pos	Team	Pld	W	D	L	PF	PA	PD	Pts	Qualification
1	St Helens (C, L)	27	21	0	6	674	374	+300	42	Advance to semi-finals
2	Wigan Warriors	27	19	0	8	818	483	+335	38	Advance to semi-finals
3	Huddersfield Giants	27	17	1	9	613	497	+116	35	Advance to elimination finals
4	Catalans Dragons	27	16	0	11	539	513	+26	32	Advance to elimination finals
5	Leeds Rhinos	27	14	1	12	577	528	+49	29	Advance to elimination finals
6	Salford Red Devils	27	14	0	13	700	602	+98	28	Advance to elimination finals
7	Castleford Tigers	27	13	0	14	544	620	−76	26	
8	Hull Kingston Rovers	27	12	0	15	498	608	−110	24	
9	Hull FC	27	11	0	16	508	675	−167	22	
10	Wakefield Trinity	27	10	0	17	497	648	−151	20	
11	Warrington Wolves	27	9	0	18	568	664	−96	18	
12	Toulouse Olympique (R)	27	5	0	22	421	745	−324	10	Relegated to the Championship

(C) Champions; (L) League Leaders' Shield winners; (R) Relegated

==== Super League results ====
W Win D Draw L Loss

Super League results
Date	Round	Versus	H/A	Venue	Result	Score	Tries	Goals	Attendance	Report
12 February	1	Leeds Rhinos	A	Headingley	W	22–20	Charnley (2), Widdop, Wrench	Ratchford (3)	14,135	RLP
17 February	2	Castleford Tigers	H	Halliwell Jones Stadium	W	34–10	Charnley (2), Ashton, Mata'utia, Mulhern, Williams	Ratchford (5)	8,468	RLP
26 February	3	Toulouse Olympique	A	Stade Ernest Wallon	W	32–18	Charnley (2), King (2), Clark, Williams	Ratchford (4)	4,887	RLP
4 March	4	Catalans Dragons	H	Halliwell Jones Stadium	L	18–24	Charnley (2), Ashton	Ratchford (3)	9,295	RLP
11 March	5	St Helens	A	Totally Wicked Stadium	L	2–28		Ratchford	16,118	RLP
19 March	6	Wakefield Trinity	H	Halliwell Jones Stadium	L	22–38	Ashton, King, Thewlis, Walker	Ratchford (3)	8,164	RLP
1 April	7	Hull Kingston Rovers	A	Sewell Group Craven Park	L	18–34	Mata'utia, Thewlis, williams	Widdop (3)	10,069	RLP
14 April	8	Salford Red Devils	H	Halliwell Jones Stadium	W	32–18	King (3), Ashton (2), Philbin	Ratchford (4)	8,486	RLP
18 April	9	Hull FC	A	MKM Stadium	L	16–18	Ashton (2), Clark	Ratchford, Widdop	9,726	RLP
23 April	10	Huddersfield Giants	H	Halliwell Jones Stadium	W	32–10	Thewlis (3), Currie, King, Wrench	Dean (4)	8,102	RLP
30 April	11	Wigan Warriors	H	Halliwell Jones Stadium	L	22–40	Ashton, Dean, Mata'utia, Walker	Dean, Mata'utia, Thewlis	10,104	RLP
14 May	12	Catalans Dragons	A	Stade Gilbert Brutus	L	8–40	Wrench	Mata'utia (2)	9,307	RLP
19 May	13	St Helens	H	Halliwell Jones Stadium	L	10–12	Widdop, Williams	Ratchford	10,476	RLP
3 June	14	Leeds Rhinos	H	Halliwell Jones Stadium	L	4–40	Ashton		9,984	RLP
12 June	15	Wakefield Trinity	A	Be Well Support Stadium	L	24–30	Ashton, Clark, Widdop, Wrench	Ratchford (4)	3,891	RLP
24 June	16	Hull FC	H	Halliwell Jones Stadium	W	4–0		Ratchford (2)	8,591	RLP
3 July	17	Salford Red Devils	H	Halliwell Jones Stadium	L	24–32	Clark, Ratchford, Thewlis, Widdop	Ratchford (4)	8,559	RLP
10 July	18	Catalans Dragons	N	St James' Park	W	36–10	Nicholson, Ratchford, Thewlis, Wardle, Widdop, Williams	Ratchford (6)	25,333	RLP
16 July	19	Castleford Tigers	A	Mend-A-Hose Jungle	L	22–35	Ashton, Clark, Currie, Holmes	Ratchford (3)	6,279	RLP
22 July	20	Hull KR	H	Halliwell Jones Stadium	L	22–30	Wardle (2), Mikaele	Ratchford (5)	7,551	RLP
30 July	21	Huddersfield Giants	A	John Smiths Stadium	L	22–32	Ashton (2), Wardle	Ratchford (5)	4,549	RLP
5 August	22	Wigan Warriors	A	DW Stadium	L	6–32	Currie	Ratchford	13,261	RLP
11 August	23	Toulouse Olympique	H	Halliwell Jones Stadium	W	32–18	Wrench (2), Currie, Holmes, Williams	Ratchford (5), Mata'utia	9,199	RLP
19 August	24	Leeds Rhinos	A	Headingley	L	18–24	Currie, Dean, Wardle	Mata'utia (3)	13,152	RLP
25 August	25	Castleford Tigers	H	Halliwell Jones Stadium	L	18–19	Duffy, Mata'utia, Ratchford	Ratchford (3)	8,104	RLP
29 August	26	Huddersfield Giants	A	John Smiths Stadium	L	36–38	Duffy (4), Lynch, Wardle, Williams	Hayes (3), Ratchford	4,894	RLP
3 September	27	Salford Red Devils	A	AJ Bell Stadium	W	32–14	Thewlis (2), Holmes, Minkin, Thomas, Williams	Hayes (3), Clark	5,123	RLP

=== Challenge Cup ===
W Win L Loss

Challenge Cup results
Date	Round	Versus	H/A	Venue	Result	Score	Tries	Goals	Attendance	Report
27 March	6	Wakefield Trinity	H	Halliwell Jones Stadium	L	12–16	Thewlis, Wrench	Widdop (2)	2,627	RLP

== Squad ==
2022 Warrington Wolves Squad
First team squad			Coaching staff
1 (England) Stefan Ratchford – SO, FB (GK); 2; 3 (Samoa) Peter Mata'utia – CE, SO (GK); 4 (Ireland) Toby King – CE (Out On Loan); 5 (England) Matty Ashton – WG; 6 (England) Gareth Widdop – SO, FB (GK); 7 (England) George Williams – SH; 8 (England) Joe Philbin – PR; 9 (England) Daryl Clark – HK; 10; 11 (England) Ben Currie – SR, CE; 12 (England) Oliver Holmes – SR, LF; 13 (England) Jack Hughes – LF, SR, PR (c)	14 (Australia) Jason Clark – LF; 15 (England) Joe Bullock – PR; 16 (England) Danny Walker – HK; 17 (England) Matt Davis – LF; 18; 19 (England) Rob Mulhern – PR; 20 (England) James Harrison – PR; 21 (England) Greg Minikin – WG; 22 (England) Josh Thewlis – FB, WG, CE (GK); 23 (England) Connor Wrench – WG, CE; 24 (Scotland) Ellis Longstaff – LF, SR; 27 (England) Riley Dean – SH, SO (GK); 28 (Nigeria) Eribe Doro – PR	29 (England) Jacob Gannon – SR; 30 (England) Morgan Burgess – PR; 31 (England) Tom Whitehead – SR; 32 (Ireland) Kyle Amor – PR; 33 (Samoa) Thomas Mikaele – PR; 34 (England) Jake Wardle – CE; 35 (England) Matty Nicholson – SR; 36 (Australia) Matt Dufty – FB; 37 (England) Jack Darbyshire – CE, SO	Head coach: Daryl Powell; Legend: (c) Captain(s); (vc) Vice-captain(s); Injured; GK = Goal Kicker; Updated: 31 May 2022; Source(s): 2022 Squad Numbers
