= Jamaine Wray =

Jamaica international rugby league footballer

Personal information
- Born: 15 March 1984 (age 42)

Playing information
- Position: Hooker, Loose forward
Club
Years	Team	Pld	T	G	FG	P
2003–06	Hunslet Hawks	61	17	59	0	186
2006–07	York City Knights	46	6	23	0	70
2008–12	Keighley Cougars	118	14	0	0	56
2013	London Skolars	11	0	0	0	0
	Total	236	37	82	0	312
Representative
Years	Team	Pld	T	G	FG	P
2004	West Indies	1	0	0	0	0
2009–11	Jamaica	5	2	2	0	12
- Relatives: Cai Taylor-Wray (son)

Jamaine Wray (born 15 March 1984) is a Jamaican former professional rugby league footballer who played in the 2000s and 2010s. He played at representative level for Jamaica, and at club level for Castleford Tigers (2003's Super League VIII squad), Hunslet Hawks, York City Knights and Keighley Cougars, as a hooker, or loose forward.

== Background ==
He is the father of Warrington Wolves fullback Cai Taylor-Wray.

== International career ==
In October 2024, Wray played for the West Indies in their match against South Africa.

Jamaine Wray played, scored a try, and was man of the match in Jamaica's 26–36 defeat by United States in the 2010 Atlantic Cup at Hodges Stadium, Jacksonville, Florida on Tuesday 16 November 2010.
