= Cai Taylor-Wray =

English professional rugby league footballer

Cai Taylor Wray
Personal information
- Full name: Cai Taylor-Wray
- Born: 24 February 2006 (age 20) Leeds, West Yorkshire, England
- Height: 5 ft 11 in (1.81 m)
- Weight: 13 st 8 lb (86 kg)

Playing information
- Position: Fullback
Club
Years	Team	Pld	T	G	FG	P
2024–	Warrington Wolves	15	9	0	0	20
2025(loan)	→ Widnes Vikings	1	1	0	0	4
	Total	16	10	0	0	24
- Source: As of 8 August 2026
- Father: Jamaine Wray

Cai Taylor-Wray (born 24 February 2006) is an English professional rugby league footballer who plays as a fullback for the Warrington Wolves in the Betfred Super League.

He has spent time on loan from Warrington at the Widnes Vikings in the RFL Championship.

== Background ==
Taylor-Wray was born in Leeds, West Yorkshire, England and grew up in the Cross Gates suburb in East Leeds. He is of Jamaican and English heritage, and is the son of former Jamaica international Jamaine Wray.

He played for East Leeds ARLFC as a junior.

Taylor-Wray played for Yorkshire in the Origin series. He also played for the England Academy side.

He joined the Wolves Scholarship system aged 14 and gained an academy contract at 16.

== Career ==
Taylor-Wray formed a key part of the under 18s side that reached the Academy Grand Final against St Helens in 2023 and continued to play a key role in the academy and reserve teams in 2024, scoring 17 tries in as many appearances.

In June 2024 he made his début for the Wire in the Super League against the Wigan Warriors.

In September 2024 Taylor-Wray signed a three-year contract at the Halliwell Jones Stadium until the end of the 2027 season with an additional club option for a further 12 months.

He spent March and April 2025 on loan from Warrington at the Widnes Vikings in the RFL Championship.

Taylor-Wray was given the number 1 shirt by head coach Sam Burgess, with former 2024 Super League Dream Team fullback Matt Dufty being forced out of the team.
