= Luke Thomas (rugby league) =

Wales international rugby league player

Personal information
- Full name: Luke Thomas
- Born: 19 October 2002 (age 23) Crewe, Cheshire, England
- Height: 6 ft 1 in (1.86 m)
- Weight: 15 st 4 lb (97 kg)

Playing information
- Position: Prop
Club
Years	Team	Pld	T	G	FG	P
2022–	Warrington Wolves	6	1	0	0	4
2022(loan)	→ Rochdale Hornets	2	0	0	0	0
2023(loan)	→ Swinton Lions	1	0	0	0	0
2023(loan)	→ Hull KR	0	0	0	0	0
2025(DR)	→ Widnes Vikings	0	0	0	0	0
	Total	9	1	0	0	4
Representative
Years	Team	Pld	T	G	FG	P
2022–	Wales	1	0	0	0	0
- Source: As of 23 March 2026

Luke Thomas (born 19 October 2002) is a Wales international rugby league footballer who plays as a prop for the Warrington Wolves in the Super League.

He has also spent time on loan from Warrington at the Rochdale Hornets in League 1.

== Background ==
Thomas was born in Crewe, Cheshire, England. He is of Welsh descent.

== Playing career ==
=== Early career ===
During his childhood, Thomas began playing rugby union before switching to rugby league at the age of 11. He played junior rugby league for Latchford Giants before joining the academy at Warrington Wolves.

=== Club career ===
In August 2022, Thomas made his Wolves Super League début against the Leeds Rhinos.

==== Widnes Vikings (DR) ====
On 29 May 2025 it was reported that he had signed for Widnes Vikings in the RFL Championship on DR loan for the remainder of the 2025 season

=== International career ===
In June 2022, he made his senior international debut for Wales in a 10–34 defeat against France. He was called up by Wales during the 2021 Rugby League World Cup as a replacement for the injured Ben Evans.
