= Leon Hayes =

English rugby league footballer

Personal information
- Full name: Leon Hayes
- Born: 4 March 2004 (age 22) Warrington, Cheshire, England
- Height: 5 ft 5 in (1.64 m)
- Weight: 12 st 6 lb (79 kg)

Playing information
- Position: Scrum-half, Hooker
Club
Years	Team	Pld	T	G	FG	P
2021–	Warrington Wolves	12	0	6	0	12
2021(loan)	→ West Wales Raiders	1	0	0	0	0
2023(loan)	→ North Wales Crusaders	1	0	0	0	0
2026(loan)	→ Salford RLFC	1	0	0	1	1
2026	→ Widnes Vikings (loan)	2	0	7	0	14
	Total	17	0	13	1	27
- Source: As of 19 November 2026

Leon Hayes (born 4 March 2004) is an English professional rugby league footballer who plays as a scrum-half for the Warrington Wolves in the Super League.

== Playing career ==
=== Warrington Wolves ===
He has spent time on loan from Warrington at the West Wales Raiders in League 1 and at North Wales Crusaders in 2023

In 2022 Hayes made his début for the Wire in the Super League against the Huddersfield Giants.

In 2024 Hayes made his breakthrough playing in Round 2 due to an injured George Williams, once Williams returned Hayes was favoured to play in the halves alongside him over Josh Drinkwater. He was selected every game following by new Head Coach Sam Burgess. Hayes played only two games for Warrington in the 2025 Super League season as they missed the playoffs finishing 8th on the table.

=== Salford RLFC (loan) ===
On 9 April 2026 it was reported that he had signed for Salford RLFC in the RFL Championship on short-term loan

=== Widnes Vikings (loan) ===
On 16 April 2026 it was reported that he had signed for rivals Widnes in the RFL Championship on loan
