= Ewan Smith =

Cook Islands businessman (born 1951)

Sir Ewan Smith KNZM
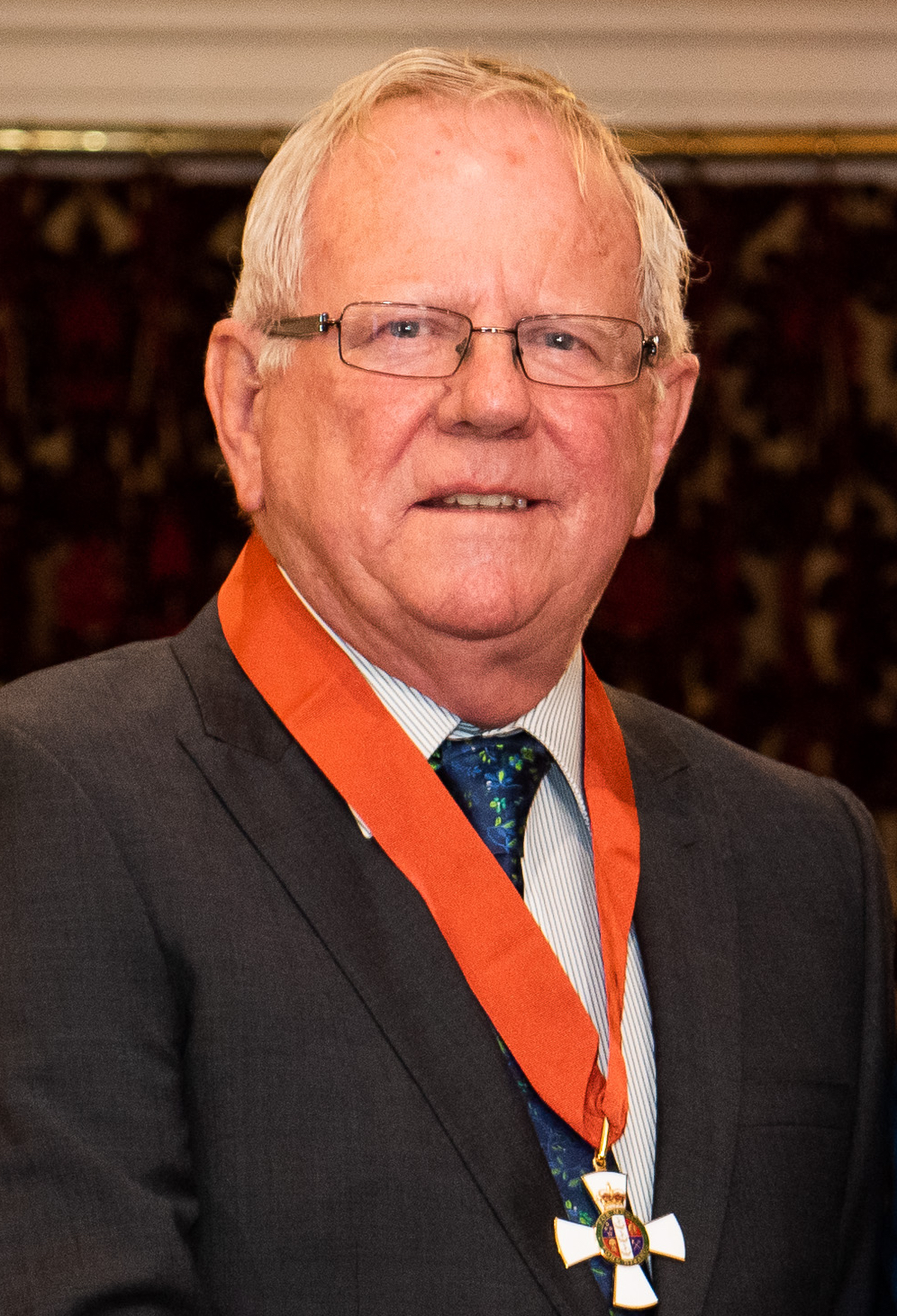
- Smith in 2019
- Born: Ewan Francis Smith; 3 April 1951 (age 74); New Zealand
- Occupations: Businessman; airline executive
- Known for: Founder and managing director of Air Rarotonga
- Spouse: Fenny Manavaroa (m. 1984)
- Children: 5

Sir Ewan Francis Smith KNZM (born 3 April 1951) is a Cook Islands-based aviation executive. He is the founder and managing director of Air Rarotonga.

== Early life and family ==
Smith was born in New Zealand on 3 April 1951, the son of Audrey Smith (née Harris) and Elmer Smith, and spent his childhood in Rotorua. He arrived in Rarotonga in 1973 at the age of 22 as a qualified pilot and licensed aircraft maintenance engineer, intending originally to stay only a few years.

In 1984, Smith married Fenny Veronica Manavaroa in Rarotonga. The couple went on to have five children.

== Career ==
=== Air Rarotonga ===
In 1978, Smith founded Air Rarotonga, and has since served as its managing director. Under Smith’s leadership, Air Rarotonga became one of the Cook Islands' largest private-sector employers, with over 95 percent local staffing.

During the COVID-19 pandemic, Smith opted not to lay off any airline staff, placing all employees, including himself, on the minimum wage. The airline continued to operate essential services, including cargo deliveries, medical evacuations, and COVID-19 vaccine transportation throughout the Cook Islands and into Kiribati.

=== Governance and appointments ===
Smith has served in various leadership roles in regional tourism and business. He has been chair of the Cook Islands Tourism Corporation since 2010, a former chair of the Association of South Pacific Airlines, and served as president of the Cook Islands Chamber of Commerce in 1996.

== Other activities ==
In 2023, Smith played a role in the launch of the vaka Teariki Moana in Aitutaki for the Pacific Islands Forum leaders' meeting. The vaka later began operating as a tourism experience. Smith has been patron of the Rarotonga Golf Club since 2005, and is a Fellow of the King's College Foundation in Auckland.

Smith is also an author, professional photographer and amateur cook.

== Honours and awards ==
In 2009, Smith received a lifetime achievement award at the first Air New Zealand Cook Islands Tourism Awards.

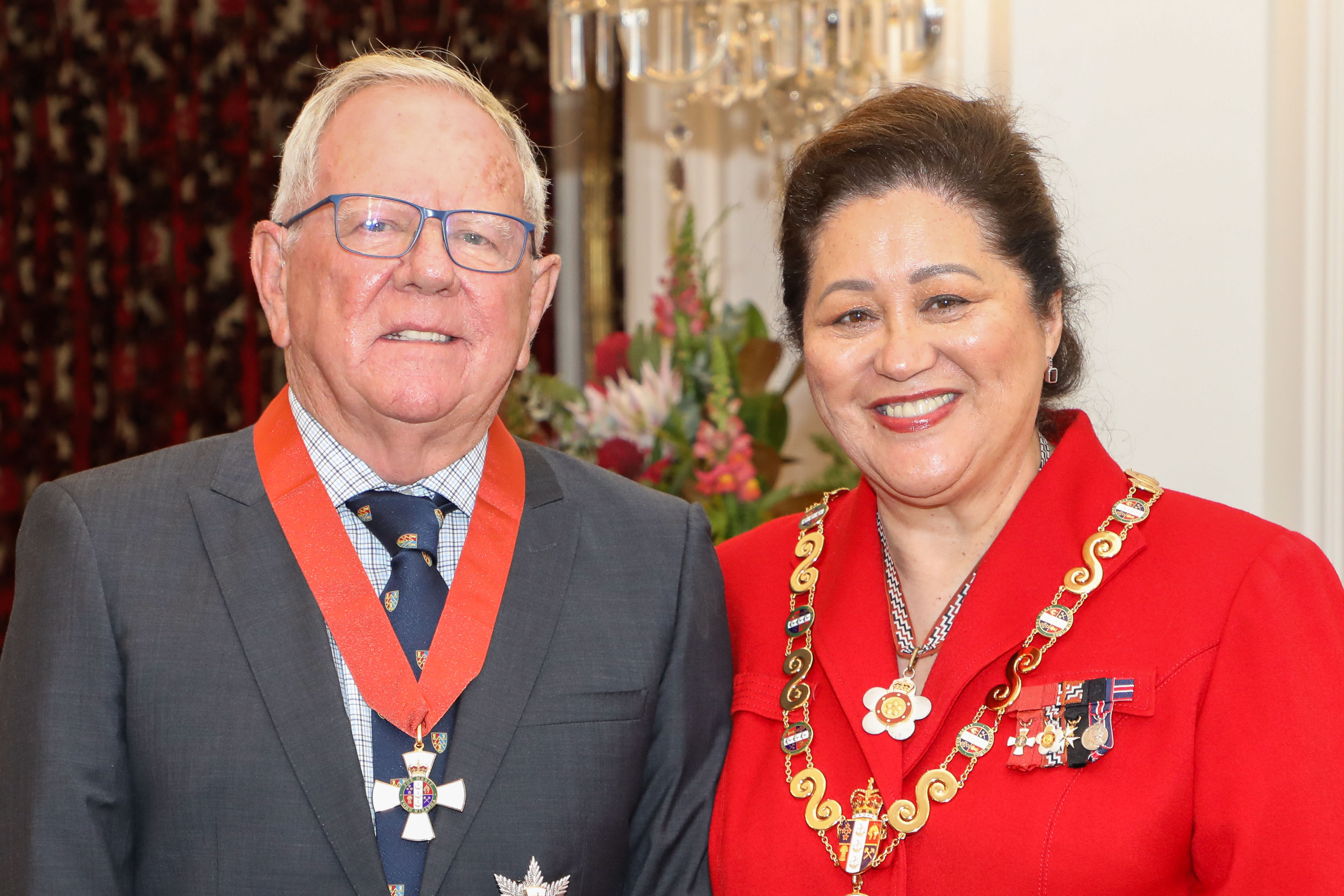
Smith (left), after his investiture as a Knight Companion of the New Zealand Order of Merit by the governor-general, Dame Cindy Kiro, at Government House, Wellington, on 17 September 2025

In the 2019 Queen’s Birthday Honours, Smith was appointed a Companion of the New Zealand Order of Merit, for services to Cook Islands business and tourism. In the 2025 King’s Birthday Honours, he was promoted to Knight Companion of the New Zealand Order of Merit, also for services to Cook Islands business and tourism.
