= Warrington Wolves =

English professional rugby league club

Club information
- Full name: Warrington Wolves Rugby League Football Club
- Nickname(s): Wire; Wolves; Warry
- Colours: Primrose yellow, blue and white
- Founded: 1876; 150 years ago (as Warrington Zingari Football Club)
- Website: warringtonwolves.com

Current details
- Ground: Halliwell Jones Stadium (15,300)
- CEO: Karl Fitzpatrick
- Chairman: Stuart Middleton
- Coach: Sam Burgess
- Captain: Ben Currie
- Competition: Super League
- 2026 Season: 3rd (Grand Finalists)
- Current season

Uniforms
Home colours	Away colours

Records
- Championships: 3 (1948, 1954, 1955)
- Challenge Cups: 9 (1905, 1907, 1950, 1954, 1974, 2009, 2010, 2012, 2019)
- Other honours: 26
- Most capped: 620 – Brian Bevan

The Warrington Wolves are a professional rugby league club based in Warrington, England. They play home games at the Halliwell Jones Stadium and compete in the Super League, the top tier of British rugby league. Warrington are the only British-based club to have played every season in the top flight. They have won the League Championship three times and the Challenge Cup nine times.

The club's traditional home colours are white, primrose and blue. Warrington have local rivalries with Widnes Vikings, St Helens, Wigan Warriors, Salford Red Devils and Leigh Leopards.

== History ==
=== Early years: 1876–1895 ===
Although the official foundation date for the club is given as 1876, rugby football was certainly played in the town before that date and there was an earlier club bearing the name of Warrington Football Club. Under the heading 'Outdoor Sports – Football', the Widnes Guardian of 25 January 1873 reports on a recent game between Warrington and Wigan at the unnamed ground of the former. On 6 December 1873, that same newspaper carried details of a match involving Warrington and Zingari (probably a Withington, Manchester club of that name) and in subsequent weeks there were matches with Sale and Free Wanderers. This club folded after its ground was lost to development work.

Warrington Zingari Football Club was formed in 1876 by seven young local men. Zingari is the Italian word for gypsies and was commonly adopted by clubs that lacked a permanent base. The team initially played on a field in the Howley Wharf area. Warrington Zingari's first recorded game was an away game against Penketh on 28 October 1876, resulting in a defeat by a goal to nil. When the earlier Warrington club folded, Warrington Zingari decided to take the vacant Warrington Football Club name for the start of the 1877–78 season.

Over the next seven years, Warrington Zingari had five new homes – off Sankey Street at two different sites, off Wilderspool Causeway at two different sites and Slutchers Lane. Amalgamations followed with Padgate Excelsior in 1881 and Warrington Wanderers in 1884 but the team retained the name Warrington.

Both the Lancashire and Cheshire Rugby Unions suspended all their competitions in the 1880s, clubs such as Warrington, St Helens, Widnes, Wigan and Runcorn that wanted to play in cup competitions formed a West Lancashire and Border Towns Union which ran a league competition until 1895 and competitions for a few years after 1895. In 1886, Warrington won their first silverware, the West Lancashire and Border Towns Trophy.

Whilst Warrington were founder members of the West Lancashire League in 1889, they decided not to play in the competition in the 1890–91 and 1891–92 seasons, but became inaugural members of the Lancashire Club Championship First Class Competition in 1892–93.

On 28 August 1895, the committee decided to join with 21 other clubs throughout Lancashire and Yorkshire to form a new 'Northern Union' and resigned from the RFU.

=== Northern Union to the First World War: 1895–1918 ===
The new competition drew the top teams from Yorkshire and Lancashire, which led to a rise in the standard of opponents. Warrington defeated Hunslet 5–4 in their opening match but this was followed by four successive defeats. In a tough first season, Warrington finished 13th out of 22.

After only a single season of the cross-county competition, the Northern Union was boosted by a number of clubs defecting from the RFU. The Northern Union reverted to two county based leagues, and Warrington took part in the Lancashire Senior Competition, but could only manage a mid-table finish. The Wire fared better in the new Northern Union Challenge Cup and made it to the semi-final against eventual winners Batley before bowing out.

In 1898, Warrington moved to their Wilderspool Stadium home. A 10-year lease was agreed with Greenall Whitley for land on the east side of their existing ground, a pitch previously used by Latchford Rovers Rugby Club.

In 1900–01, Warrington reached the final of the Challenge Cup, facing Batley. A crowd of 29,000 turned out at Leeds to see Warrington battle hard but be beaten by two tries to nil. Warrington also appeared in the renamed South West Lancashire Cup against Leigh two days later. The strenuous game against Batley took its toll on the Warrington players and the match ended in a 0–0 draw. The replay never took place as Warrington were unable to raise a team and so forfeited the trophy.

Warrington's first trophy in the new era followed the next season when the Wire picked up the South West Lancashire League and a play-off was required to beat Widnes after the teams finished level on points.

The 1901–02 season saw the reestablishment of a cross-county league. Warrington were one of the 14 teams that were to form the Northern Rugby Football League.

In 1903–04, Warrington defeated Bradford Northern in a semi-final replay to earn a place in the final of the Challenge Cup. Warrington put up a fine performance against Halifax but lost 8–3. After two Challenge Cup final defeats, Warrington finally succeeded in bringing home the cup in 1904–05. Warrington beat Hull Kingston Rovers 6–0 in front of a crowd of 19,638. A highest to date league finish of fifth was achieved in the same season.

Warrington's second Challenge Cup victory came two years later in 1907, when Warrington beat Oldham 17–3. A Lancashire Cup final defeat to Broughton Rangers occurred in the same season.

On 14 November 1908, the first touring Australian rugby league team visited Warrington. The Kangaroos embarked upon a massive six months' tour of Britain, taking in 45 matches. Their timing was not good as the north of England was hit by strikes in the cotton mills, which badly affected attendances as fans could not afford to watch the pioneering Aussies. On Saturday 14 November 1908 Warrington played the Kangaroos. Warrington won the match 10–3, with Jackie Fish the hero scoring one try and Ike Taylor the other. Fish and George Dickenson kicked a goal each. A crowd of 5,000 watched the match at Wilderspool. The Warrington team that day was Jimmy Tilley, Jack Fish, George Dickenson, Ike Taylor, Lewis Treharne, Ernest Brooks, John Jenkins, William Dowell, Alfred Boardman, Billy O'Neill, George Thomas, Peter Boardman, and John Willie Chester. The Australians came back to Wilderspool for "revenge" later in the tour but tries from Jack Fish, and John Jenkins earned the 'Wirepullers' an 8–8 draw. Two members of the Kangaroo squad, Dan Frawley and Larry O'Malley, later signed for Warrington and played the next season at Wilderspool. Warrington have the best record of any club side against the touring Kangaroos, with eight wins, one draw, and seven defeats from sixteen matches.

In 1913, Warrington reached their fifth Challenge Cup Final, with wins over Keighley, Hull Kingston Rovers, Salford and Dewsbury. The final was lost 9–5 to Huddersfield. Warrington scored first through a try by Bradshaw converted by Jolley. A disappointing league season had seen Warrington finish 18th, their lowest before the First World War.

Warrington purchased Wilderspool in 1914, with the freehold being held in trust for club members. At first, the beginning of the First World War did not impact rugby league competitions, as authorities decided to continue with normal fixtures, in part due to the mistaken belief that the war would be short.

Competitive fixtures were suspended for the 1915–16 season and Warrington did not play any friendly matches due to difficulty raising a team. Wire recommenced playing in 1916 following the introduction of conscription, which meant that they would not be accused of keeping men from volunteering for the First World War.

=== The inter-war years: 1918–1939 ===
After the war ended, Warrington took part in the hastily arranged Lancashire League played during 1918–19. In the Lancashire League, a runners-up spot was achieved in 1920–21.

After a bad start to the 1921–22 season, Warrington won 12 out of 13 matches. This included an 8–5 victory over the visiting Australasian team of the 1921–22 Kangaroo tour of Great Britain. Warrington beat St. Helens Recs and Leigh to reach the final of the Lancashire Cup. Wire beat Oldham 7–5, despite playing with only 12 men for most of the match after centre Collins sustained a broken collar bone.

After finish in a record low position of 20th in 1923–24, the club improved to ninth the following season, before finishing second, and securing a first ever top four play-off, in 1925–26. Swinton were beaten in the semi-final, but the final against Wigan ended in disappointment.

After a bad start to the 1927–28 season and a poor previous season, culminating in an all-time low in 1928 when the club suffered its then record defeat 68–14 at Hunslet, Warrington notched up victories over Hull Kingston Rovers, Huddersfield and finally Leeds in the semi-final of the Challenge Cup. The final against Swinton was played at Central Park, Wigan, with an estimated 12,000 travelling from the town to watch the match. Warrington were beaten 5–3, but a contentious decision could have cost the Wire the match. The Kangaroos visited Wilderspool again in 1929, Wire were without five regular players either playing for Lancashire or injured. Despite this, Warrington beat the tourists 17–8.

In 1932–33, the Lancashire Cup was won by beating St Helens in a close fought match, the final result being 10–9 to Warrington. St. Helens Recs. and Wigan were disposed of on the way to that particular victory. As well as doing well in the league the team had reached the Challenge Cup final for the seventh time. This was the first time Warrington played at Wembley. The Wire lost 21–17 to Huddersfield. In the 1933–34 season, Warrington played Australia and for once were beaten. Warrington also had the honour of playing the first rugby league match against a French side, captained by Jean Galia. In a season of firsts a match was played in Dublin to introduce the game to Ireland. A good crowd saw Wigan beat Warrington by 32–19.

The highlight of the 1935–36 season was a place in the Challenge Cup final at Wembley. Barrow were beaten in the first round, the second round was drawn away at Halifax with Warrington winning the replay at Wilderspool 18–15. Wigan were then beaten 5–2 to set up a semi-final against Salford at Wigan. Warrington was short of regular players and were thought to stand little chance, but as ever in they rose to the occasion to gain victory. Fifteen special trains were laid on as the town made its way to London for the final, however Leeds ran out 18–2 winners.

Chris Brockbank became Wire's first team manager in 1936. In the 1937–38 season, Oldham and Widnes were both knocked out by Warrington as they headed for another Lancashire Cup victory, this time 8–5 over Barrow.

During World War II, it was difficult to play matches and therefore pay the bills. To help out the club committee decided that a Limited Company of 10,000 £1 shares was to be created. The Warrington Football Club Limited was born. Warrington dropped out of the wartime Lancashire league in 1941–42 due to Wilderspool Stadium being requisitioned by the United States Air Force for storage, and did not return to league competition until 1945–46.

=== Post Second World War, the Bevan era: 1945–1962 ===
The early post-war years saw a boom in rugby league in general, and the glory years of the Warrington club. An Australian winger named Brian Bevan made his debut for Warrington in 1945. He would be Warrington's top try scorer in all but one season until his retirement in 1962 with a total of 740 tries in 620 games for Warrington. The Wire won all the code's major honours during his period at the club.

Warrington got off to a bad start to the 1947–48 season but the club signed new forwards Harold Palin, Bill Darbyshire and Bill Riley. Warrington then went two months without defeat. The club also signed centres Albert Pimblett and Bryn Knowelden. With these new signings, Warrington went undefeated in 20 games from December 1947 to April 1948, won the Lancashire League and gained a place in the championship top four play-off. The club's first championship win came that season. Warrington defeated Huddersfield in the league semi-final. The final, against Bradford Northern, was staged at Maine Road and Warrington took the trophy by a margin of 17–5.

Warrington won the 1948–49 Lancashire League after 19 straight wins at the start of the season. The record attendance at Wilderspool was set on 13 March 1948 when 34,304 spectators saw Warrington play Wigan. They reached the 1948–49 Lancashire Cup final but Wigan beat them to take the trophy. In the league Warrington lost only five matches all season. Huddersfield exacted one of Wire's few defeats in the play-off final as Wire missed out on back-to-back championships by just one point, 13–12.

Wire paid a then record fee of £4,600 for Ally Naughton from Widnes. Naughton would play a major part in a good cup run took the Wire to the 1950 Challenge Cup final. This time they were to play local rivals Widnes. They led 14-nil at half-time, eventually taking the trophy by 19-nil. This was Wire's first Challenge Cup triumph at Wembley.

The 1950–51 season saw Warrington finish the year as Lancashire League winners, Lancashire Cup runners-up and championship runners-up. Warrington lost the Lancashire Cup final to Wigan 28–5 at Swinton in front of a record 42,541 supporters. Warrington paid their third visit in four years to Maine Road to face Workington in the championship final. Despite leading 8–3 at half-time, Wire went down to a 26–11 defeat. In 1951 Ces Mountford was appointed coach with a ten-year contract after Chris Brockbank ended 15 years at the helm to take up a hotel business in Blackpool.

The pinnacle of Warrington's achievements was reached in 1953–54. Consistent league form secured the Lancashire League, and saw a second-placed finish in the championship and qualified for the top four play-off. St. Helens came to Wilderspool and were well beaten 11–5. They despatched Leeds in the Challenge Cup to get to their second final of the season, they were to play Halifax in both games. The intense Wembley final ended in a draw, two goals a piece. The replay was held at Odsal, Bradford and a record 102,569 paid to see Warrington defeat Halifax 8–4. Thousands more got in for free and estimates of the total crowd were in the region of 120–130,000. The week after the two teams met again in the championship final at Maine Road. Warrington secured another victory by four goals to Halifax's two goals and a try. The club had done the league and cup double as well as the Lancashire Cup.

Wire secured the league championship for the second successive season in 1954–55; they beat Halifax in the semi-final on the way to the final against Oldham at Maine Road. For the second consecutive season Warrington took the honours, the final score was 7–3. Warrington won the Lancashire League as well to make it ten pieces of silverware in eight years. That championship success was the last to date for Wire.

The 1955–56 season saw a tournament titled the ITV Floodlit Competition. Eight clubs participated in a series of games played at football grounds in the London area, with Warrington eventually running out 43–18 victors over Leigh at Loftus Road. Warrington made it to the 1956 championship final held at Maine Road but lost to Workington Town.

Wire's run of success came to a sudden stop in 1956–57. It was a transformation period for Warrington with many big name players top names ending their Wire careers. Ces Mountford used a total of 40 players during the campaign, the highest since World War Two and a figure that was not beaten until 1976–77. Unsurprisingly, Wire finished only tenth in the league. Attendances were down on previous seasons and on 19 January 1957, Warrington launched a lottery, which played an important part in the club's finances in future seasons.

In the 1959–60 season, they won the Lancashire Cup for the first time in 22 years, playing all their games away from home. St. Helens were the final hurdle but the Wire managed a 5–4 win at Central Park. This ended a period of four seasons without silverware.

In 1961, Warrington reached the championship final held at Odsal, but Leeds had total control over the match and ran out 25–10. This also turned out to be the last match for long serving coach Ces Mountford.

Ernie Ashcroft took over as coach for the 1961–62 season. Easter Monday 1962 saw Brian Bevan's last match for Warrington, a 29–17 defeat of Leigh.

=== 1962–1971 ===
There was a split into two divisions in 1962–63 with Warrington gaining sixth spot in the top flight.

During the early part of the 1965–66 season floodlights were installed and a friendly match against Wigan was arranged. They were officially switched on for the match on Tuesday 28 September, Wigan winning the match. Warrington's home game against Widnes became the first rugby league match to be broadcast on BBC albeit only to the south of England. The final of the Lancashire Cup was reached by gaining a 21–10 victory over Oldham in the semi-final. The final against Rochdale Hornets, at Knowsley Road, was won 16–5. It was Ashcroft's only trophy in his time as Wire coach.

Success was proving difficult for Warrington. Attendances had dwindled, costs were rising and the club were having financial difficulties. Wire appointed a new coach Jackie Fleming in 1967 who won the Lancashire League (1967–68) then Joe Egan in 1969.

After a disastrous start to the 1970–71 season, coach Joe Egan decided to stand down. He was replaced by Peter Harvey. The change made little difference as the club won only 11 out of 24 matches. The club also had debts of around £33,000. The club was saved by a take-over bid from new chairman Ossie Davies and as part of the rescue package on 20 May 1971, Alex Murphy was appointed the new player-coach of the club.

=== Alex Murphy era: 1971–1978 ===
After crashing out of the Lancashire Cup and the Floodlit Trophy in 1971–72, the team created a club record eight successive defeats. Warrington improved for the Challenge Cup; reaching the semi-finals, only missing out on a Wembley trip after losing a tense replay against St Helens. Murphy had brought renewed optimism to Wilderspool and average attendances went up by more than a thousand.

Success came in 1972–73. Warrington lost only one of their opening 22 games and ended the season with the League Leader's Trophy.

Next season, 1973–74 was arguably Warrington's most successful for 20 years. The Captain Morgan Trophy competition was run for the first and only time and Wire clinched it with a 4–0 defeat of Featherstone. Warrington followed that up with a 27–16 defeat of Rochdale Hornets in the John Player final and then Murphy's men beat Featherstone for the second time that season in a cup final 24–9 win the Challenge Cup. The icing on the cake was the top eight play-off trophy, secured after a 13–12 success over St. Helens for a four-cup haul.

In 1974–75 Wire returned to Wembley for the Challenge Cup final only to have their celebrations spoiled by Widnes while they also had to settle for runners-up in the Floodlit Trophy.

In contrast to recent seasons, nothing went right for Warrington in 1975–76. They finished tenth in the league and crashed out of the Lancashire Cup and the BBC2 Floodlit Trophy competitions in the opening round. Challenge Cup hopes ended in the third round at home to Widnes but they were lucky not to have been knocked out in the first round by amateurs Leigh Miners at Wilderspool. Warrington struggled to a 16–12 success.

There was no silverware again in 1976–77 but Warrington finished fifth in the league. They crashed out of the Premiership play-offs at the first hurdle, but yet appeared in the final, after Hull Kingston Rovers fielded an ineligible player and the match was awarded to Warrington. Wire won through to the final but lost to St Helens at Swinton 32–20.

In 1977–78, Murphy's reign came to an end despite winning the John Player Trophy 9–4 against Widnes at Knowsley Road, St Helens. Poor league form had left Wire dangerously close to the drop at one point and that meant Murphy lost many friends on the terraces.

=== Late 1970s to mid-1990s ===
In 1978, Warrington appointed Billy Benyon as Alex Murphy's successor. A solid year-round performance saw Warrington finish second in the league, losing only 8 matches all year. A major highlight of the season was the controversial 15–12 victory over the Ashes-winning 1978 Kangaroo tourists. For the second year running the club reached the John Player Trophy final, but were unable to repeat the previous year's victory, the match going to Widnes by 16–4.

Wire celebrated their centenary in 1979 owing to an erroneous belief that the club had been founded in 1879 rather than 1876.

The 1980–81 season brought the Lancashire Cup and the John Player Trophy. After consistently good performances in the league, they were league championship runners-up. They also won the 1985 Premiership Trophy final against Halifax. Warrington also made it to the 1986–87 John Player Special Trophy held at Burnden Park but were beaten 4–18 by Wigan.

Warrington had another new coach in 1982, their former Challenge Cup medal winner Kevin Ashcroft. Benyon was later to win an unfair dismissal case against Warrington. Ashcroft steered Warrington to Lancashire Cup glory in his first full season, a year marred by the Wilderspool fire which wiped out the complete main stand.

Warrington and Ashcroft parted company in May 1984, despite Ashcroft still having two years on his contract. Reg Bowden, Wire's third new coach in six years, took over. Bowden's two-year spell as coach was notable for some of his signings, most notably a world record fee for Great Britain and Widnes scrum half Andy Gregory, rather than success on the field. The new signings didn't bring success, and Bowden resigned and assistant coach Tony Barrow took over as caretaker coach in March 1986.

Success soon followed. A home win against Widnes and away to Wigan put Wire in the final of the Premiership Trophy against champions Halifax at Elland Road. Wire ran out 38–10 winners. In 1986–87, Wire finished third place in the league and runners-up in the John Player Trophy and in the revamped Premiership Trophy.

Australian Brian Johnson was appointed the club's head coach and manager in 1988. Warrington won the Lancashire Cup final a year later in 1989. In 1990 Warrington made it to the final of the Challenge Cup at Wembley Stadium and faced arch rivals Wigan. Warrington lost 34–16 and this is the last appearance in the Challenge Cup final before their success in 2009.

Warrington won the Regal Trophy in 1991 beating Bradford Northern 12–2 at Headingley, Leeds. In June 1993 due to financial pressures, Warrington listed 13 players for a total of £340k when they refused lower contract payments. Warrington made it to the final of the Regal Trophy in 1994 but lost 40–10 to Wigan at McAlpine Stadium, Huddersfield, they also came close to winning the championship finishing third on points difference behind Wigan and Bradford. The following season, Warrington made the Regal Trophy final once more, again losing to Wigan.

With the advent of Super League, several mergers between clubs were proposed. Warrington were scheduled to merge with Widnes to form Cheshire who would compete in Super League. This brought an outcry from both sets of fans, and Warrington were awarded a place in the Super League as an unmerged side.

The need to switch to summer, led to a truncated 1995–96 season which ran from August–January, with October reserved for the World Cup. Despite Warrington's mediocre league form, they found themselves in the semi-final of the Regal Trophy at St Helens. This ended in an 80–0 defeat which brought about the departure of coach Brian Johnson, and a run of seven defeats.

=== Super league era: 1996–2002 ===
In 1996, the first tier of British rugby league clubs played the inaugural Super League season and changed from a winter to a summer season. Following a number of Super League clubs, such as Bradford Bulls, who changed their names to be marketable to new audiences, Warrington added "Wolves" to their name for the start of the 1997 season; wolf symbols had started to appear on Warrington shirts in the early nineties, and a wolf featured in the middle of the town's coat of arms. To mark this change, Warrington produced a new logo.

John Dorahy took over as coach and the new era started optimistically. Their first Super League game was a 22–18 win at Leeds and Wolves finished fifth place in the inaugural Super League. This was as good as it got for Wolves a long time, Warrington became a 'selling club', first losing Iestyn Harris to Leeds, then Paul Sculthorpe to Saint Helens. Dorahy resigned in March 1997, before the end of the season with Warrington sitting on the bottom of the Super League ladder.

In 1997, Darryl van der Velde took over as head coach. Plans to move from Wilderspool Stadium were announced with Burtonwood the likely site. The former brewery on Winwick Road was chosen to be the new home for Warrington and Tesco were also to develop on the land with their first ever supermarket in the town. A lengthy planning process finally ended with permission finally given for a 14,206 capacity stadium and supermarket to be built. The capacity was reduced to 13,500 on safety grounds after the first match.

Wilderspool stadium was sold to the local council for £1 million in 1998 but despite this Wolves finish the season in financial trouble with massive debts.

In 2000, retired Australian captain and scrum-half, Allan Langer came out of retirement to play in Super League for Warrington Wolves. He captained the side and took them to within one match of the Challenge Cup final in 2000.

Steve Anderson succeeded van der Velde in August 2001, he was replaced by his assistant David Plange mid-season following a run of 11 defeats which threatened Warrington's record of continuous top level rugby. Paul Cullen was appointed head coach in 2002, becoming the third coach of the season. Cullen not only achieved survival but also led Wolves to a first ever play-off appearance since the reintroduction of this format in 1998.

=== Move to Halliwell Jones Stadium: 2004–2009 ===
Warrington's first season in the Halliwell Jones Stadium saw slight underachievement on the pitch reflected in their finishing position of eighth in Super League, though they did make the Challenge Cup semi-finals. However, they recorded a significant increase in their average attendances and midway through the season the club was purchased by events promoter Simon Moran. Moran immediately released fresh investment into the club, enabling coach Paul Cullen to sign Great Britain centre Martin Gleeson for a club record fee reported in the region of £200,000 as well as New Zealand internationals Henry Fa'afili and Logan Swann.

Their best season in Super League has been the 2005 season (Super League X), where they finished in 4th place and earned a home tie in the playoffs. Australian scrum-half Andrew Johns played 3 games for the club when his Australian club Newcastle concluded their season. He is rumoured to have been paid around £40,000 (A$100,000) per match for the Wire. The signing caused controversy for a number of reasons: if the Wire had made the Super League Grand Final, it would have clashed with the Kangaroos Tri-Nations test against New Zealand in Sydney, Australia; also, many people questioned why Warrington were allowed to bring in a player in time for the Super League play-offs after he had finished playing a full season in Australia. The signing and subsequent confusion over the rules led other Super League clubs to follow the example set by the Wire and signed their own Antipodean players on short-term contracts.

On 22 September 2006, Warrington beat Leeds 18–17 at Headingley to progress to the second round of the Super League play-offs. This was the first time during the Super League era that the Wire had progressed past the first round of the play-offs. However, they were unable to progress any further as they were beaten 40–24 by Bradford Bulls at Odsal Stadium.

For the 2007 season, Warrington signed current Great Britain international Adrian Morley on a four-year deal from the Sydney Roosters NRL club, Paul Johnson, another Great Britain international, from Bradford Northern on a three-year deal and New Zealand international back rower or centre Vinnie Anderson, 27, on a three-year deal from St Helens, paying a £50k transfer fee. Warrington finished the 2007 season seventh in the table, which was seen as a disaster for the club following the impressive signings made during the close season. Finishing 7th resulted in Warrington missing out on the end of season playoffs for the first time in three years with local rivals Wigan pipping the Wire on the last weekend of the season.

On 27 May 2008, Paul Cullen resigned from the coaching role at the club following a run of only one victory in seven league fixtures. James Lowes was appointed as the new head coach of the club and given a contract until the end of the 2010 season. The club went on to finish the season in sixth position in the table and securing a play-off tie away to Catalans Dragons. The Wolves lost 46–8 ending what was another season to forget for the club.

=== Tony Smith era: 2009–2017 ===
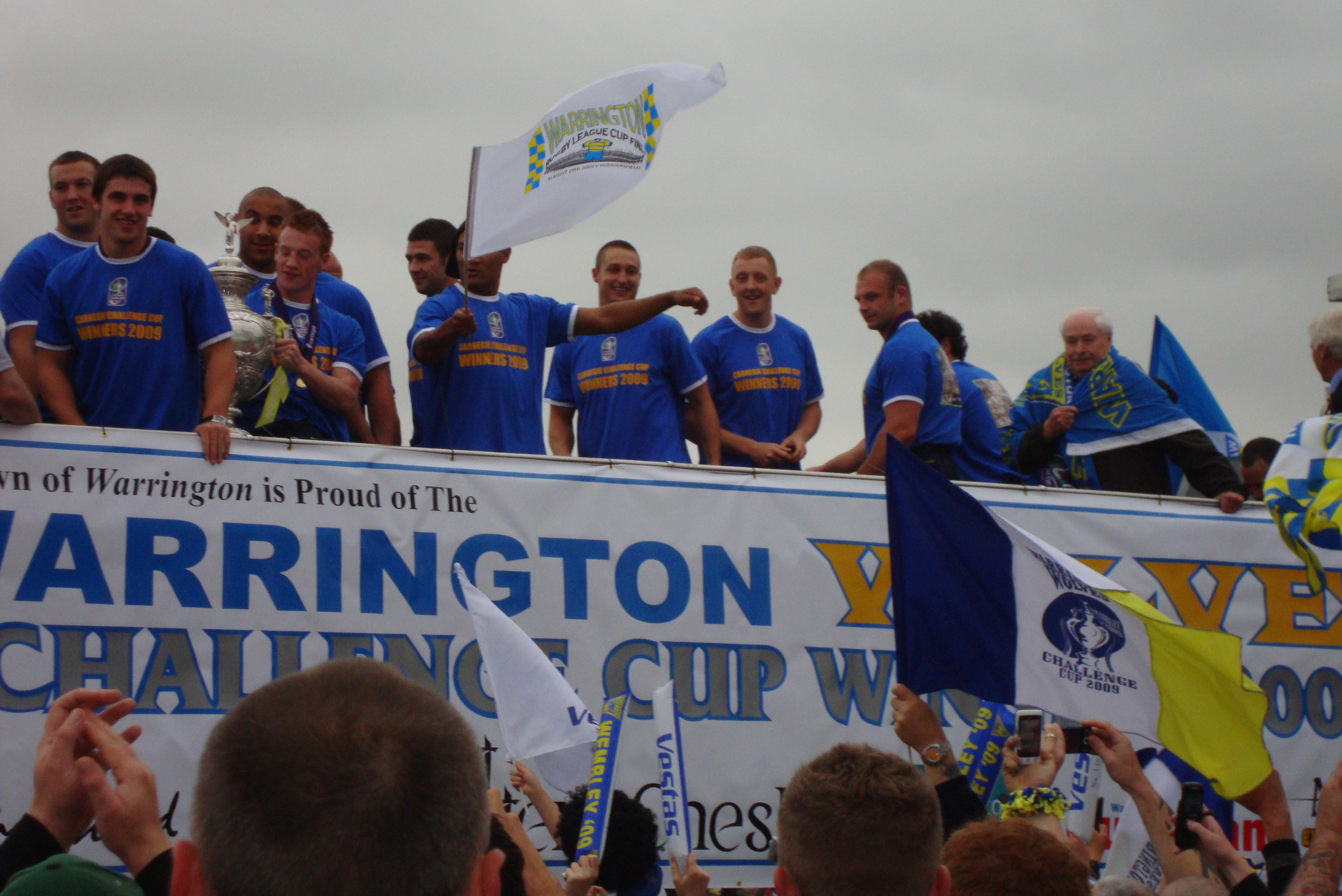
Warrington Wolves trophy parade following victory at the 2009 Challenge Cup Final

On 5 March, after losing all three of their opening games to the Super League XIV season, Warrington removed James Lowes from the position of head coach, and replaced him with then-England coach, Tony Smith who was also given the role of director of rugby.

On 30 May 2009, Warrington reached the semi-finals of the Challenge Cup, beating Hull Kingston Rovers 24–25 via a drop goal from Lee Briers in golden point extra time to earn a place in the last four. The semi-final draw pitted the Wire against Wigan. On 8 August 2009, Warrington beat Wigan to reach Wembley for the first time in 19 years and despite only averaging crowds of 8,000 in recent seasons (2009 average attendance 8,155) they sold just over 34,500 tickets for the Challenge Cup final. Wolves faced the Huddersfield Giants in the final at Wembley Stadium in front of a 76,560 crowd. Warrington scored first after a charge down with Richie Mathers going over the line under the sticks. Warrington eventually won the game 25–16 with Michael Monaghan winning the Lance Todd Trophy for the man-of-the-match performance. Warrington returned home from Wembley with the cup and was greeted by more than 100,000 fans who had been starved of success for 35 years. This was their first Challenge Cup win since 1974, and the team arrived home on an open top bus, and paraded the trophy round the town before heading to the town hall. Warrington finished the 2009 season in lowly 10th place missing out on the play-offs yet again. After the final game of the season Chairman Lord Doug Hoyle announced that he would be stepping down from the post and leaving the Wolves.

On 8 August 2010, the Wolves emphatically beat Catalans Dragons 54–12 at the Halton Stadium, Widnes to reach the Challenge Cup Final for the second consecutive season. Warrington went on to win the final, defeating Leeds Rhinos 30–6. Once again over 35,000 Wolves supporters travelled down to Wembley Stadium to see the Wolves lift the trophy for the second successive time, this being the first time in the club's history this has been done. On the return to Warrington the following day over 100,000 people lined the streets of the town to welcome home the team and the trophy.

The 2010 Super League season saw the Wolves finish in 3rd place the club's highest ever finish in the Super League era. Warrington qualified for the end of season play-offs only to lose both fixtures to St. Helens and Huddersfield Giants. This meant that the Wolves had only won one of the club's six play-off fixtures to date.

The 2011 Super League season saw Wolves end their St. Helens hoodoo with victory in the away fixture which was played at the Halton Stadium, Widnes. The Wolves secured their double over the St. Helens with a 35–28 triumph over the rivals in the reverse fixture later in the season. 2011 saw the Wolves register impressive victories away to Leeds Rhinos (6–42), Bradford Bulls (14–58) and Salford City Reds (0–60). They also registered big scorelines at home to Harlequins RL (84–6), Bradford Bulls (64–6), Wakefield Trinity Wildcats (66–12) and Castleford Tigers (62–0). On 20 August 2011, the Wolves beat Catalans Dragons 12–25 in Perpignan to register the club's 8th successive league victory for the first time in the Super League era. On 9 September 2011, the Wolves beat Hull F.C. to secure the League Leaders Shield for the first time. Warrington were beaten in the play-off semi-final by Leeds Rhinos who eventually went on to win the Grand Final beating St Helens at Old Trafford on 8 October.

Going into the 2012 Super League season the Warrington club announced that they had over 8,000 season tickets, which is a record for Warrington and a vast improvement on the crowds of just 3/4,000 in the Wilderspool days.

In 2012, the Wolves enjoyed another successful season in both the league and cup competitions. In the 2012 Challenge Cup the Wolves were crowned cup winners for the 3rd time in 4 years following a 35–18 victory over Leeds Rhinos at Wembley Stadium. Over 35,000 Wolves supporters made the trip to see the side bring back the famous trophy. The Wolves also made it through to the Super League Grand Final and were backed by 40,000 fans at the theatre of dreams. The Wolves faced the Rhinos for the right to become champions but it was Leeds who held on to become back-to-back champions.

In 2013, Warrington finished Super League XVIII in second place with 41 points, only 1 point behind League Leaders Shield winners Huddersfield Giants. Warrington won their qualifying play-off against Leeds with the final score 40–20, Ben Westwood scored 4 tries. The result put Warrington through to the qualifying semi-final against Huddersfield, who were defeated 30–22. In the Grand Final Warrington Wolves faced Wigan Warriors and lost by 30–16.

In 2016, the club's 140th year, the club reached the Challenge Cup final losing 10–12 to Hull F.C. but the Wolves went on to win the League Leader Shield against Hull F.C. at the KCOM Stadium, bringing the first piece of silverware back to the Halliwell Jones Stadium since 2012, and bagging a home Semi-final tie against St. Helens. This was won, earning them the right to play in the Super League Grand Final against Wigan Warriors. Warrington fell to a 6–12 defeat, with Declan Patton scoring all the Wires' points, despite leading 6–2 at half-time.

The Wolves failed to make the Super 8s in 2017, finishing ninth in the regular season as they suffered from inconsistency. Warrington secured Super League status with seven wins out of seven. In the Challenge Cup, the Wolves fell at the quarter-final stage following a nervy 26–27 home defeat by the Wigan Warriors. In September 2017, the Wolves announced that head coach Tony Smith would leave his position at the club following nine successful years which has seen the Wolves compete in seven major finals, winning three Challenge Cups and two League Leaders Shields.

=== Steve Price: 2018–2021 ===
In the Super League XXIII season, Warrington reached the 2018 Super League Grand Final against Wigan but lost the match 12–4 at Old Trafford. During the Super League XXIV season, Warrington reached the Challenge Cup final against St Helens and won the match 18–4 at Wembley Stadium. It was Warrington's first Challenge Cup triumph in seven years. Warrington finished the Super League XXIV season in 4th place on the table and qualified for the finals. Warrington's season was ended the following week when they lost 14–12 against Castleford in the elimination final.

In the 2020 Super League season, Warrington finished third on the table. However, they were eliminated from the first week of the playoffs losing to Hull F.C.

In the 2021 Super League season, Warrington finished in third place on the table. However, just like the 2020 season, the club were eliminated from week one of the playoffs losing to Hull Kingston Rovers 19–0. It was also the final game in charge for Steve Price, who left the club at the end of the season, being replaced by former Castleford boss Daryl Powell for the 2022 season.

=== Daryl Powell: 2022–2023 ===
In the 2022 Super League season, Warrington endured a difficult campaign finishing 11th on the table with the club winning just nine games all year in the league.

At the start of the 2023 Super League season, Warrington recorded eight consecutive victories to sit top of the Super League table. However, from round 9 to round 20, the club only recorded four victories. After losing 42–6 to bottom placed Wakefield Trinity in round 20, Powell departed the club by mutual consent. Warrington had lost their final six games under Powell which saw them fall to sixth on the table. Warrington would eventually finish sixth on the table to qualify for the playoffs. Warrington would lose their elimination play off final against St Helens 16–8 which ended their season.

=== Sam Burgess: 2024 ===
On 7 August 2023, Burgess signed a two-year contract to become Warrington's new head coach ahead of the 2024 Super League season. Under Burgess, Warrington started the season in good fashion and at the halfway point of the season were sitting fourth on the table. On 8 June 2024, Burgess coached Warrington in their 2024 Challenge Cup final defeat against Wigan. Warrington would finish the 2024 Super League season in third place on the table. After defeating St Helens 23–22 in the elimination playoff, the club would fall one game short of the grand final losing to Hull Kingston Rovers 10–8. This extended Warrington's championship drought to 70 years.

In 2025, Warrington reached the Challenge Cup Final for the second consecutive season, facing Hull Kingston Rovers at Wembley Stadium. Warrington led 6–2 at half-time following a try from Josh Thewlis, and remained ahead until the closing stages, when Tom Davies scored for Hull KR before Mikey Lewis converted to give the Robins an 8–6 victory. Warrington half-back Marc Sneyd was awarded the Lance Todd Trophy despite the defeat, becoming only the second player after Sean Long to win the award three times. The club's league form declined significantly following the Wembley defeat and, despite a late attempt to return to play-off contention, Warrington finished the 2025 Super League season in eighth place and failed to qualify for the play-offs.

Warrington returned to contention for major honours in the 2026 Super League season. In the Challenge Cup, Burgess guided the club to the semi-finals after a 24–10 quarter-final victory over Leigh Leopards, before they were eliminated by Hull Kingston Rovers. In Super League, Warrington finished the regular season in third place, securing a home play-off eliminator against defending champions Hull KR. Warrington defeated Hull KR 35–12 at the Halliwell Jones Stadium before travelling to face second-placed Leeds Rhinos in the semi-final. A closely contested match at Headingley ended in a 14–12 victory for Warrington, with an Ewan Irwin penalty in the 65th minute proving decisive. The victory sent Warrington to the Super League Grand Final for the first time since 2018 and for the fifth time in the club's history.

In the 2026 Super League Grand Final at Old Trafford on 3 October, Warrington faced Wakefield Trinity, with both clubs attempting to win the Super League title for the first time. Wakefield dominated the first half and led 19–0 at the interval following tries from Cameron Scott, Isaiah Vagana and Jazz Tevaga and a drop goal from Jack Sinfield. Warrington improved after half-time, with Arron Lindop scoring two tries, but a further Wakefield try from Tom Johnstone helped Trinity secure a 23–10 victory. The defeat was Warrington's fifth loss in five Super League Grand Final appearances, following previous defeats in 2012, 2013, 2016 and 2018, and extended the club's wait for a league championship, having last been champions in 1955.

== Kit sponsors and manufacturers ==
Period	Kit sponsor	Shirt sponsor
1970–1982	Bukta	
1982–1986	Halbro	Sparkomatic
1986–1989	Umbro	Vladivar
1989–1990	Bukta	Greenalls
1990–1995	Ellgren	Greenalls
1996–2000	New Balance	Greenalls
2001–2004	Kit	Miller Homes
2005	Kit	Omega
2006	Puma	Omega
2007–2009	Canterbury	Omega
2010	ISC	Vestas
2011–2012	ISC	Bensons for Beds
2013	ISC	Brookson
2014–2017	ISC	Emirates
2018	ISC	One Energy
2019	O'Neills	One Energy
2020 – Present	O'Neills	Hoover

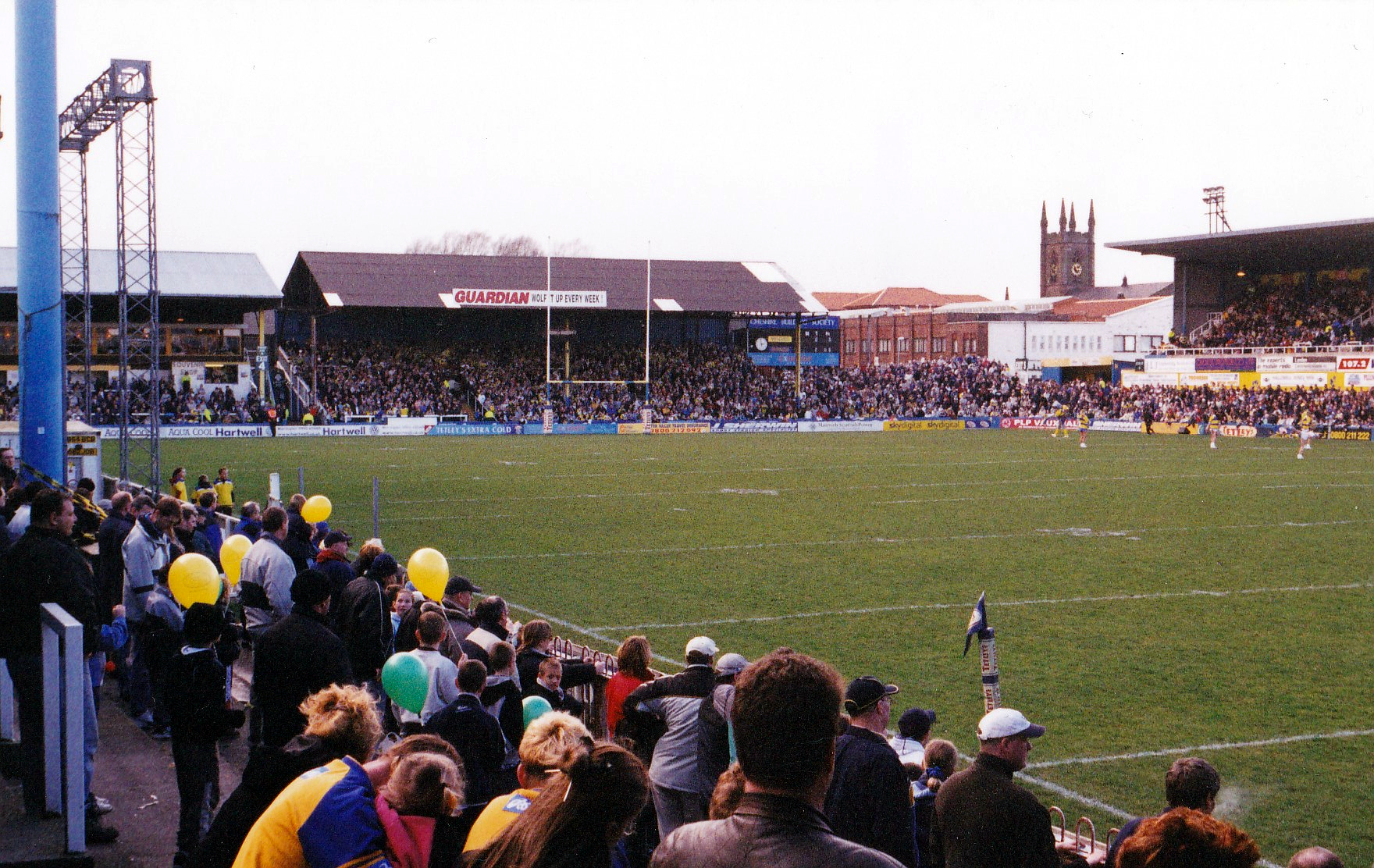
Wilderspool in 2001

== Stadiums ==
=== 1881–2003: Wilderspool ===
Warrington moved into the Wilderspool in 1881 and spent over 130 years there. In the late 1990s the club planned to move to a new stadium instead of redeveloping Wilderspool.

=== 2004–present: Halliwell Jones Stadium ===
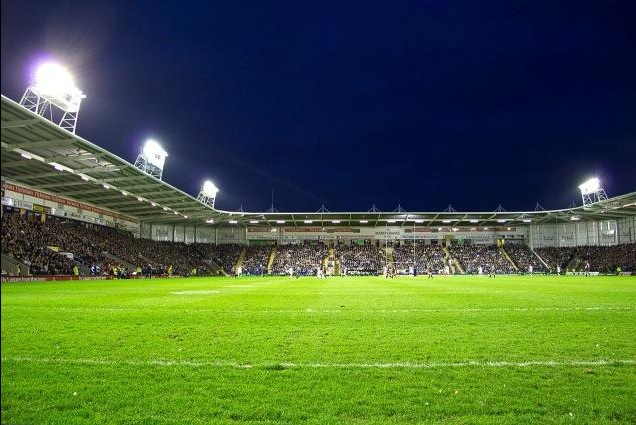

In 2004 Warrington moved into a new stadium 13,012 capacity stadium. The stadium was notable for bucking the common trend of modern stadia by including terracing areas rather than being an all-seater stadium. There were originally four stands in the stadium – the North Stand (reserved seating), the East Stand (originally unreserved seating but later became reserved seating), the South Stand (home terracing), and the West Stand (visitors' terracing and overflow of home terracing). It also has enormous pitch dimensions of 120 m x 74 m, as requested by Warrington's head coach of the time, Paul Cullen, due to his desire to play expansive rugby. In 2012 the stadium capacity was expanded to 15,200 by filling in two corners of the stands. In 2017 the stadium added two permanent big screens, one outside the north east corner for advertising, and one inside the south east corner to enhance gameday experience.

== Rivalries ==
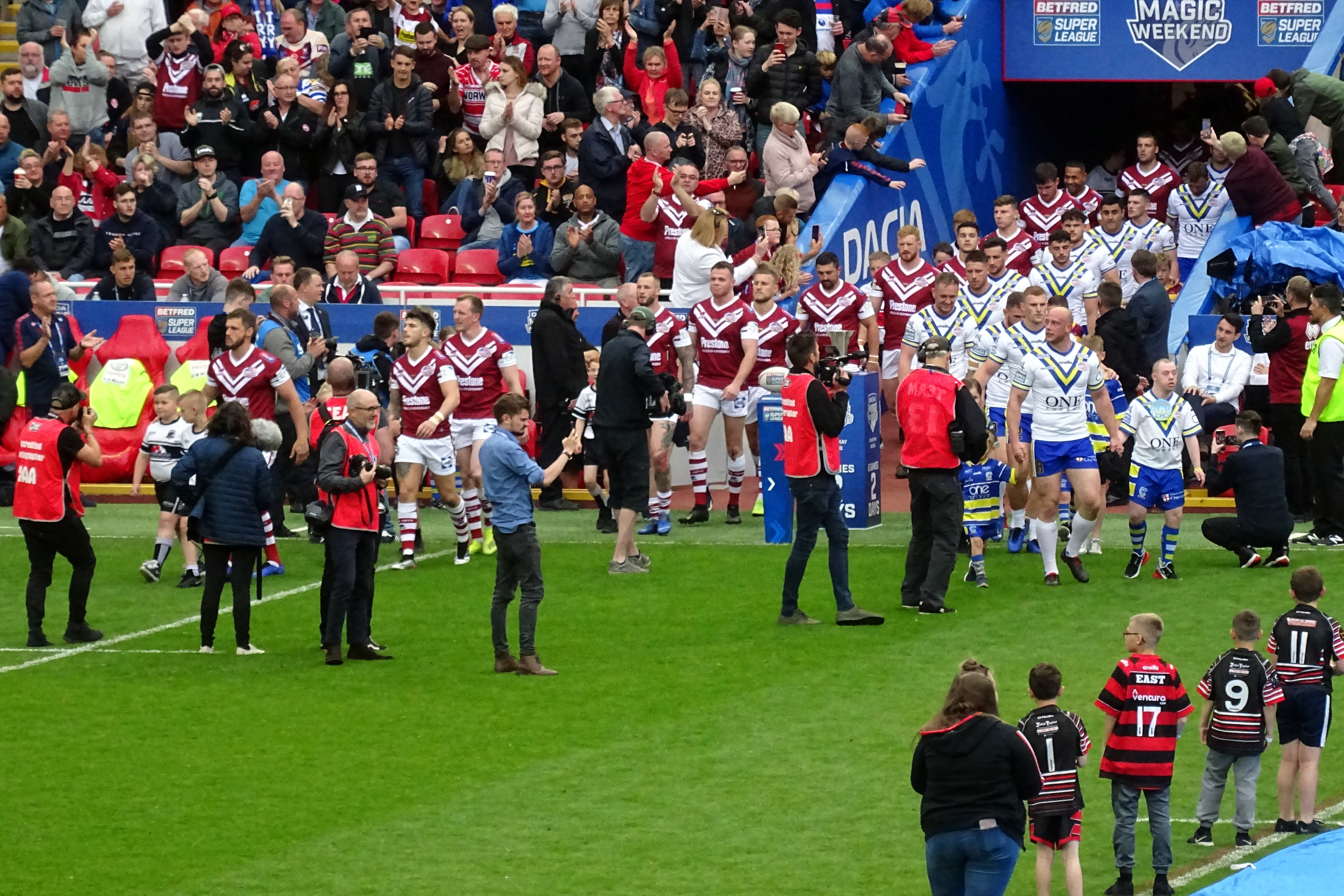
Warrington and the Wigan Warriors walking out ahead of the match at Anfield in 2019

The Warrington Wolves have several rivalries, the fiercest of which is with the Widnes Vikings. Widnes were out of the top flight for a large period of the Super League era so the rivalry is not as fierce as it used to be. Games involving the Wigan Warriors have gained a rivalry due to the recent success of the Wolves and the Warriors and with both teams continuing to be among the top four clubs in the Super League era.

Since the start of the Super League the fixtures against St Helens have become a fierce battle due to the St Helens holding a hoodoo over Warrington. From 1992 to 2010, Warrington only managed to beat Saints once (in 2001). However, in 2011 and 2012, the Wire managed to win three of six derbies, including a win in the 2012 playoff semi-final. Saints continued their dominance with a 22–10 victory the next year. In 2015, Warrington lost their first away match at Langtree Park to St Helens, as well as the Magic Weekend fixture at St. James' Park, Newcastle 20–16, giving Warrington their first Magic loss to the Saints. However as of March 2026 Warrington Wolves are games unbeaten against the Saints.

Other rivalries include the Salford Red Devils and the Leigh Centurions for geographical reasons.

== 2027 squad ==
2027 Warrington Wolves squad
First team squad			Coaching staff
1 (Ireland) Josh Thewlis (gk) – WG, FB; 2 (Australia) Albert Hopoate – WG, CE; 3 (England) Arron Lindop – CE, WG; 4 (Australia) Jacob Gagai – FB, CE, WG; 5 (England) Matty Ashton – WG; 6 (Australia) Brodie Croft – SO; 7 (England) Ewan Irwin (gk) – SH, SO; 8 (Australia) Luke Yates – LF, PR; 9 (England) Danny Walker – HK; 10 (England) James Harrison – PR, SR	11 (Australia) Kelepi Tanginoa – SR, PR; 12 (Malta) Sam Stone – SR; 13 (England) Ben Currie (c) – SR, LF; 14 (England) Cai Taylor-Wray – FB; 15 (Niue) Toafofoa Sipley – PR; 16 (Ireland) Liam Byrne – PR; 17 (Wales) Luke Thomas – PR; 18 (Australia) Toby Crosby – PR; 19 (England) Leon Hayes (gk) – SH, HK; 20 (Fiji) Mitchell Prest – PR	21 (England) Adam Holroyd – SR; 22 (Australia) Josh Smith – WG, CE; 23 (England) Lachlan Webster – WG; 24 (Ireland) Jake Thewlis – WG; 25 (England) Charlie McKler – PR; 26 (England) Ewan Smith – SR, CE; 27 (England) Ben Hartill – HK; 28 (England) Tom McKinney – PR; 29 (England) Zack Gardner – CE; 30 (England) Pat Irwin – SH, SO	Head coach: (England) Sam Burgess; Assistant coaches: (Ireland) Richard Marshall; (England) Sam Powell; (England) Stefan Ratchford; Legend: (c) Captain(s); (vc) Vice-captain(s); (red card) = suspended; = injured; (gk) = Goal kicker; Updated: Source(s): https://warringtonwolves.com/teams/

== 2027 transfers ==
=== Gains ===
Player	From	Contract	Date
(Australia) Brodie Croft	Leeds Rhinos	3 years	21 May 2026
(Australia) Toby Crosby	Penrith Panthers	2 years	10 August 2026
(Fiji) Mitchell Prest	Mackay Cutters	2 years	10 August 2026
(Australia) Jacob Gagai	Huddersfield Giants	2 years	9 September 2026

=== Losses ===
Player	From	Contract	Date
(Ireland) Toby King	London Broncos	2 years	6 June 2026
(Ireland) Joe Philbin	London Broncos	2 years	26 June 2026
(Ireland) James Bentley	Bradford Bulls	3 years	14 August 2026
(England) Jordan Crowther	Huddersfield Giants	3 years	10 September 2026
(England) George Williams	Dolphins	2 years	13 October 2026
(England) Max Wood	Hull FC	Season long loan	28 October 2026

=== Retired ===
Player	Date
(England) Sam Powell	10 September 2026

== Players ==
=== Hall of Fame inductees ===
- Jack Fish 1898 to 1911
- Ernest "Ernie" Brookes 1902 to 1920
- George Thomas 1903 to 1914
- Frank Shugars 1904 to 1912
- James "Jim" Tranter 1911 to 1928
- Arthur Skelhorne 1911 to 1925
- William "Billy" Cunliffe 1914 to 1930
- Joseph "Joe" "Jack" 'Cod' Miller 1926 to 1946
- Thomas "Tommy" 'Tubby' Thompson 1927 to 1934
- Billy Dingsdale 1928 to 1940
- William "Bill" Shankland 1931 to 1938
- John "Jack" Arkwright (Snr) 1934 to 1945
- Harold Palin 1936 and 1947 to 1951
- Albert Johnson 1939 to 1951
- Gerry Helme 1945 to 1957
- Brian Bevan 1945 to 1962
- Robert "Bob" Ryan 1945 to 1958
- James "Jim" Featherstone 1946 to 1953
- Harry Bath 1948 to 1957
- Albert Naughton 1949 to 1961
- Eric Fraser 1951 to 1964
- Laurence "Laurie" Gilfedder 1951 to 1963
- James "Jim" Challinor 1952 to 1963
- Raymond "Ray" Price 1953 to 1957
- Bobby Greenhough 1957 to 1966
- Alastair Brindle 1957 to 1969
- William "Willie" Aspinall 1962 to 1971
- Parry Gordon 1963 to 1981
- Derek Whitehead 1969 to 1979
- John Bevan 1973 to 1986
- Dave Chisnall 1971 to 1975, 1981 to 1984
- Kenneth "Ken" Kelly 1977 to 1987
- Michael "Mike" Gregory 1982 to 1994

== Coaches ==
Coach	Years	Matches	Won	Draws	Lost	Win %
Chris Brockbank	1936–1951	216	160	4	51	74%
Cecil Mountford	1952–1961	433	282	13	138	65%
Ernie Ashcroft	1962–1967	252	133	9	110	53%
Jackie Fleming	1967–1968	67	41	1	25	61%
Joe Egan	1968–1970	73	32	4	37	44%
Peter Harvey	1970–1971	26	12	1	13	46%
Alex Murphy	1971–1978	308	176	14	118	57%
Billy Benyon	1979–1982	154	93	6	55	60%
Kevin Ashcroft	1983–1984	90	50	5	35	56%
Reg Bowden	1985–1986	68	28	0	40	41%
Tony Barrow	1987–1988	109	68	4	37	62%
Brian Johnson	1989–1996	260	140	8	112	54%
John Dorahy	1997	30	15	0	15	50%
Darryl van de Velde	1997–2001	140	59	3	78	42%
Steve Anderson	2001–2002	34	12	2	20	35%
David Plange	2002	16	4	0	12	25%
Paul Cullen	2002–2008	179	87	2	90	49%
James Lowes	2008–2009	16	7	0	9	44%
Tony Smith	2009–2017	301	200	6	95	66%
Steve Price	2017–2021	91	56	1	34	62%
Daryl Powell	2022–2023	50	21	0	29	42%
Gary Chambers	2023–2024	8	3	0	5	33%
Sam Burgess	2024–	65	38	0	27	58.46%

== Seasons ==
=== Super League era ===
Season	League									Play-offs	Challenge Cup	Other competitions	Name	Points	Name	Tries
Season	Division	P	W	D	L	F	A	Pts (Note: Win percentage for 2020 and 2021)	Pos	Play-offs	Challenge Cup	Other competitions	Top try scorer		Top point scorer	
1996	Super League	22	12	0	10	569	565	24	5th		R5		Iestyn Harris	152	Richard Henare	17
1997	Super League	22	8	0	14	437	647	16	9th		QF		Lee Briers	112	Nigel Vagana	22
1998	Super League	23	7	1	15	411	645	15	10th		R5		Lee Briers	119	Mark Forster	11
1999	Super League	30	15	1	14	700	717	31	7th		QF		Lee Briers	196	Toa Kohe-Love	28
2000	Super League	28	13	0	15	735	817	26	6th		SF		Lee Briers	255	Alan Hunte	19
2001	Super League	28	11	2	15	646	860	24	7th		SF		Lee Briers	224	Alan Hunte	16
2002	Super League	28	7	0	21	483	878	14	10th		R5		Lee Briers	197	Lee Briers	9
2003	Super League	28	14	1	13	748	619	29	6th	Lost in elimination playoffs	R4		Graham Appo	216	Graham Appo	23
2004	Super League	28	10	1	17	700	715	21	8th		SF		Lee Briers	196	Brent Grose	17
2005	Super League	28	18	0	10	792	702	36	4th	Lost in elimination playoffs	R4		Chris Bridge	153	Henry Fa'afili	23
2006	Super League	28	13	0	15	743	721	26	6th	Lost in elimination semi-final	QF		Lee Briers	277	Henry Fa'afili	26
2007	Super League	27	13	0	14	693	736	26	6th		QF		Lee Briers	239	Henry Fa'afili	22
2008	Super League	27	14	0	13	690	713	28	6th	Lost in elimination playoffs	R5		Chris Hicks	234	Chris Hicks	19
2009	Super League	27	12	0	15	649	705	24	10th		W		Chris Hicks	210	Chris Hicks	20
2010	Super League	27	20	0	7	885	488	40	3rd	Lost in preliminary semi-final	W		Ben Westwood	154	Chris Hicks	34
2011	Super League	27	22	0	5	1072	401	44	1st	Lost in semi-final	QF		Brett Hodgson	318	Joel Monaghan	33
2012	Super League	27	20	1	6	909	539	41	2nd	Lost in Grand Final	W		Brett Hodgson	255	Joel Monaghan / Chris Riley	31
2013	Super League	27	20	1	6	836	461	41	2nd	Lost in Grand Final	SF		Brett Hodgson	215	Joel Monaghan	34
2014	Super League	27	17	1	9	793	515	35	5th	Lost in semi-final	SF		Chris Bridge	244	Joel Monaghan	44
2015	Super League	30	15	0	15	714	636	30	6th		SF		Gareth O'Brien	103	Joel Monaghan / Kevin Penny	23
2016	Super League	30	21	1	8	852	541	43	1st	Lost in Grand Final	RU		Kurt Gidley	246	Ben Currie	24
2017	Super League	23	9	2	12	426	557	20	9th		QF		Dec Patton	135	Tom Lineham	21
2017	The Qualifiers	7	7	0	0	288	138	14	1st		QF		Dec Patton	135	Tom Lineham	21
2018	Super League	30	18	1	11	767	561	37	4th	Lost in Grand Final	RU		Bryson Goodwin	150	Tom Lineham	30
2019	Super League	29	16	0	13	709	533	32	4th	Lost in elimination playoffs	W		Stefan Ratchford	204	Blake Austin	19
2020	Super League	17	12	0	5	365	204	70.59	3rd	Lost in elimination playoffs	SF		Stefan Ratchford	112	Matty Ashton	11
2021	Super League	21	15	1	5	588	354	73.81	3rd	Lost in elimination playoffs	SF		Stefan Ratchford	154	Jake Mamo	17
2022	Super League	27	9	0	18	568	664	18	11th		R6		Stefan Ratchford	140	Matty Ashton	13
2023	Super League	27	14	0	13	597	512	28	6th	Lost in elimination playoffs	QF		Stefan Ratchford	214	Matty Ashton	20
2024	Super League	27	20	0	7	740	319	40	3rd	Lost in semi-final	RU		Josh Thewlis	224	Matty Ashton	30
2025	Super League	27	10	0	17	480	641	20	8th		RU					
2026	Super League	27	20	0	7	726	465	40	3rd	Lost in Grand Final	SF					

== Honours ==
=== Leagues ===
- First Division / Super League:

Winners (3): 1947–48, 1953–54, 1954–55
Runners up (13): 1925–26, 1934–35, 1936–37, 1948–49, 1950–51, 1960–61, 1978–79, 1980–81, 2012, 2013, 2016, 2018, 2026

- League Leader's Shield:

Winners (2): 2011, 2016
Runners up (2): 2012, 2013

- Premiership:

Winners (2): 1973–74, 1985–86
Runners up (2): 1976–77, 1986–87

- RFL Lancashire League:

Winners (8): 1937–38, 1947–48, 1948–49, 1950–51, 1953–54, 1954–55, 1955–56, 1967–68

=== Cups ===
- Challenge Cup:

Winners (9): 1904–05, 1906–07, 1949–50, 1953–54, 1973–74, 2009, 2010, 2012, 2019
Runners up (12): 1900–01, 1903–04, 1912–13, 1927–28, 1932–33, 1935–36, 1974–75, 1989–90, 2016, 2018, 2024, 2025

- League Cup:

Winners (4): 1973–74, 1977–78, 1980–81, 1990–91

- Floodlit Trophy:

Winners (1): 1955–56

- RFL Lancashire Cup:

Winners (9): 1921–22, 1929–30, 1932–33, 1937–38, 1959–60, 1965–66, 1980–81, 1982–83, 1989–90

== Records ==
=== Club records ===
- Biggest win:

112–0 v. Swinton Lions (at Halliwell Jones Stadium 20 May 2011)

- Biggest defeat:

0–80 v. St Helens (at Knowsley Road 4 January 1996)

- Highest all-time attendance:

34,304 v. Wigan (at Wilderspool 13 March 1948)

- Highest Super League attendance:

15,026 v. Wigan (at Halliwell Jones Stadium 14 April 2023)

=== Individual ===
Most appearances – 620 Brian Bevan
Most career tries – 740 Brian Bevan
Longest winning streak – 21 (April 1948 – November 1948)
Longest Super League winning streak – 10 (June 2011 – September 2011); & (September 2015 – March 2016)

- Most goals in a match:

- 16:

Lee Briers v. Swinton Lions (at Halliwell Jones Stadium 20 May 2011)

- Most tries in a match:

- 7:

Brian Bevan v. Leigh (29 March 1949) & v. Bramley (27 April 1953)

- Most points in a match:

- 44:

Lee Briers v. Swinton Lions (at Halliwell Jones Stadium 20 May 2011)

- Most goals in a season:

- 170:

Steve Hesford (1978–1979)

- Most tries in a season:

- 66:

Brian Bevan (1952–1953)

- Most points in a season:

- 363:

Harry Bath (1952–1953)
