= Max Wood =

English professional rugby league footballer

Personal information
- Full name: Max Wood
- Born: 28 June 2004 (age 22) Bury, Greater Manchester, England

Playing information
- Position: Prop
Club
Years	Team	Pld	T	G	FG	P
2023	Wigan Warriors	0	0	0	0	0
2023(loan)	→ Midlands Hurricanes	1	0	0	0	0
2023–	Warrington Wolves	35	3	0	0	12
2024(loan)	→ Widnes Vikings	2	1	0	0	4
2024(loan)	→ Bradford Bulls	1	1	0	0	4
2025(loan)	→ Widnes Vikings	6	0	0	0	0
2025(loan)	→ London Broncos	1	0	0	0	0
2026(loan)	→ Oldham	2	0	0	0	0
2026(loan)	→ Hull FC	5	0	0	0	0
2027	→ Hull FC (loan)	0	0	0	0	0
	Total	53	5	0	0	20
- Source: As of 15 September 2026

Max Wood (born 28 June 2004) is an English professional rugby league footballer who plays as a prop for Hull FC, on loan for the whole 2027 season, from the Warrington Wolves in the Super League.

He was contracted to the Wigan Warriors in the Super League, and spent time on loan from Wigan at the Midlands Hurricanes in League 1. Wood has spent time on loan from Warrington at the Widnes Vikings, Bradford Bulls and the London Broncos in the RFL Championship.

== Background ==
Wood was born in Bury, Greater Manchester, England.

He played for Rochdale Mayfield as a junior. He played for Lancashire in the Origin series.

== Career ==
=== Wigan Warriors ===
Wood was contracted to the Wigan Warriors in the Super League, and spent part of 2023 on loan at the Midlands Hurricanes in League 1.

=== Warrington Wolves ===
In 2024 Wood made his début for Warrington in the Super League against Hull FC.

=== Hull FC (loan) ===
On 22 June 2026 it was reported that Warrington Wolves had recalled him from his loan at Hull FC

On 21 July 2026 it was reported that he had returned to Hull FC for a second one-month loan spell

On 10 August 2026 it was reported that Warrington Wolves had recalled him early from his one-month loan spell due to fixture congestion ahead of their upcoming 3 games in 10 days

=== Hull FC (loan) ===
On 15 September 2026 it was reported that he had returned to Hull FC in the Super League for a third loan spell that will be for the whole 2027 season
