= Ewan Irwin =

English professional rugby league footballer

Personal information
- Full name: Ewan Irwin
- Born: 7 February 2008 (age 18) Leigh, Greater Manchester, England

Playing information
- Position: Scrum-half, Stand-off
Club
Years	Team	Pld	T	G	FG	P
2024–	Warrington Wolves	10	1	28	0	60
- Source: As of 23 May 2026

Ewan Irwin (born 7 February 2008) is an English professional rugby league footballer who plays as a scrum-half or stand-off for the Warrington Wolves in the Betfred Super League.

== Background ==
Irwin was born in Leigh, Greater Manchester, England.

He played for Leigh Miners Rangers as a junior.

== Early career ==
Irwin joined the Wolves Scholarship system aged 14 and progressed through the ranks.

He played for the Lancashire Origin side in 2025.

Irwin captained the Wire’s Academy team during their unbeaten 2025 season, delivering a man of the match display in the 32-18 Grand Final victory over the Leeds Rhinos. He was named Warrington's Academy Player of the Year and Academy Player’s Player of the Year in 2025.

He added three tries and 38 goals in nine reserve team appearances for Warrington in 2025.

== Career ==
In April 2025 Irwin made his début for the Wire in the Super League, coming on to debut as the 18th man against St Helens. In November 2025 he signed a five-year contract at the Halliwell Jones Stadium until the end of the 2030 season. On 3 October 2026, Irwin played in the 2026 Super League Grand Final, which Warrington lost to Wakefield Trinity 23-10.
