= Sam Stone (rugby league) =

Malta international rugby league footballer

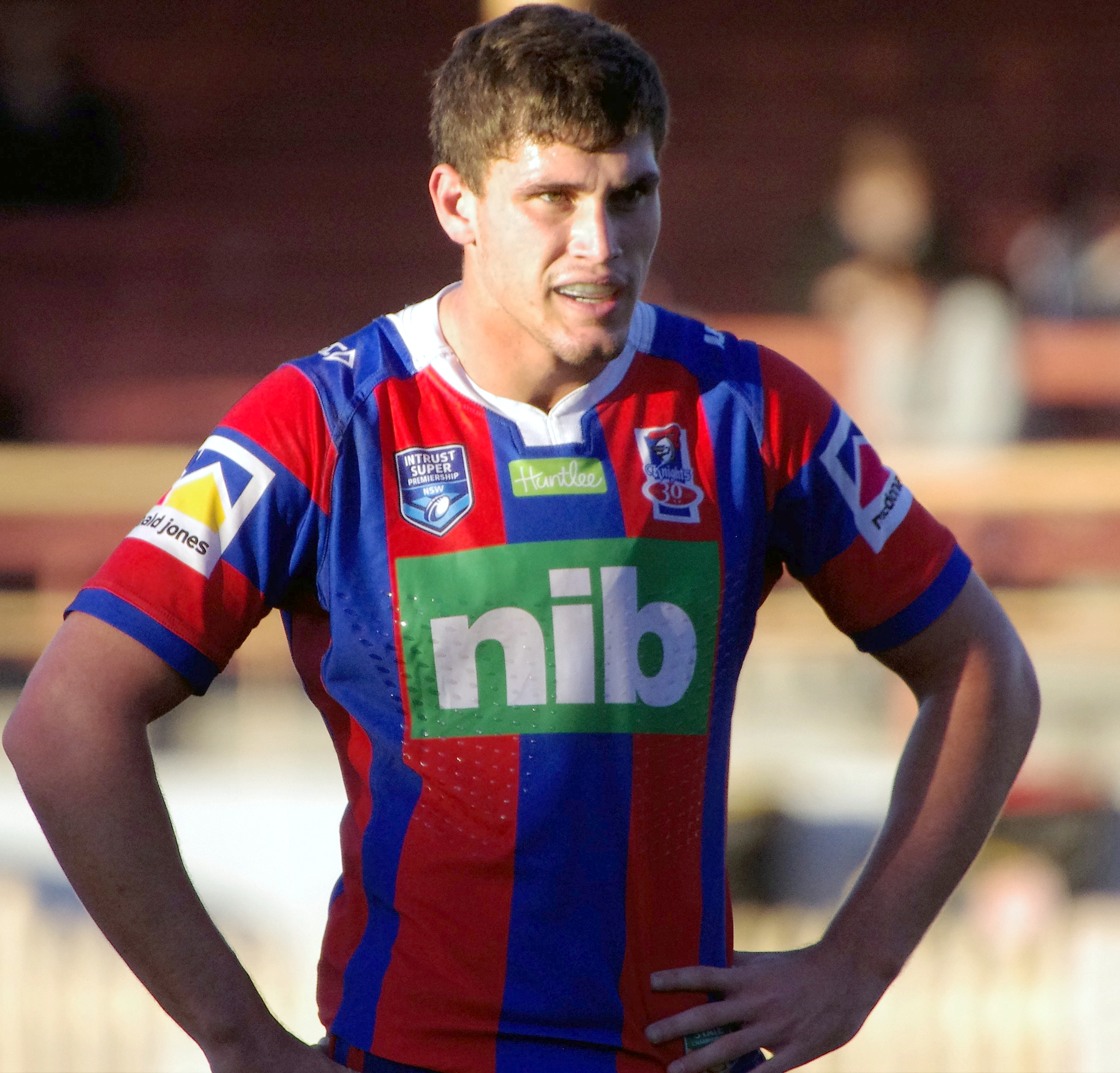

Personal information
- Born: 4 August 1997 (age 29) Gold Coast, Queensland, Australia
- Height: 6 ft 4 in (1.94 m)
- Weight: 16 st 3 lb (103 kg)

Playing information
- Position: Second-row
Club
Years	Team	Pld	T	G	FG	P
2017–18	Newcastle Knights	18	2	0	0	8
2019–21	Gold Coast Titans	21	3	0	0	12
2021–22	Leigh Leopards	38	14	0	0	56
2023–25	Salford Red Devils	50	10	0	0	24
2025(loan)	→ Warrington Wolves	12	3	0	0	12
2026–	Warrington Wolves	17	6	0	0	24
	Total	156	38	0	0	136
Representative
Years	Team	Pld	T	G	FG	P
2018	Malta	2	1	0	0	4
- Source: As of 16 November 2026
- Father: Rick Stone

Sam Stone (born 4 August 1997) is a Malta international rugby league footballer who plays as a second-row forward for the Warrington Wolves in the Super League.

He previously played for the Newcastle Knights and Gold Coast Titans in the NRL.

== Background ==
Stone was born on the Gold Coast, Queensland, Australia and is of Maltese descent. He moved to Newcastle, New South Wales at a young age.

He played his junior rugby league for the Valentine-Eleebana Red Devils and Lakes United, before being signed by the Newcastle Knights.

Stone is the son of former Huddersfield Giants and Newcastle coach Rick Stone.

== Playing career ==
=== Early career ===
In 2015 and 2016, Stone played for the Newcastle Knights' NYC team.

=== 2017 ===
In round 1 of the 2017 NRL season, Stone made his NRL debut for the Knights against the New Zealand Warriors. In May, he played for the Junior Kangaroos against the Junior Kiwis. He finished his debut season with 16 NRL matches and two tries. In September, he had his Knights contract extended until the end of 2018.

=== 2018 ===
Stone only appeared in two NRL matches for the Knights in 2018. Late in the year, he played for Malta in the 2018 Emerging Nations World Championship.

=== 2019 ===
After round 14, Stone moved to the Gold Coast Titans mid-season on a contract until the end of 2020, after failing to make an NRL appearance for the Knights so far that season. Stone made eight appearances for the Gold Coast in 2019 as the club finished last on the table.

=== 2020 ===
Stone played nine games for the Gold Coast in the 2020 NRL season as the club finished ninth on the table and missed the finals.

=== 2021 ===
On 2 August 2021, it was reported that he had signed for Leigh in the Super League.

=== 2022 ===
On 3 October, Stone played for Leigh in their Million Pound Game victory over Batley which saw the club promoted back to the Super League. On 7 November, Stone signed a contract to join Salford ahead of the 2023 Super League season.

=== 2023 ===
In round 25 of the 2023 Super League season, Stone scored a try in golden point extra-time to win the game for Salford 24-20 against Warrington. In the 2023 Super League season, Stone played a total of 23 matches for Salford as the club finished 7th on the table and missed the playoffs.

=== 2025 ===
During the period of financial turmoil at Salford Red Devils, on 15 June 2025 it was reported that he had refused to play in the match against St Helens and insisted that he will neither train nor play for the club ever again; for which he was roundly criticised by the head-coach Paul Rowley

On 17 June, it was reported that he had signed for Warrington in the Super League on loan. He made his debut for Warrington in a 16-24 defeat against Huddersfield the following week.

=== 2026 ===
On 3 October, Stone played in the 2026 Super League Grand Final, which Warrington lost to Wakefield Trinity 23-10.
