= Josh Smith (rugby league, born 2001) =

Australian professional rugby league footballer

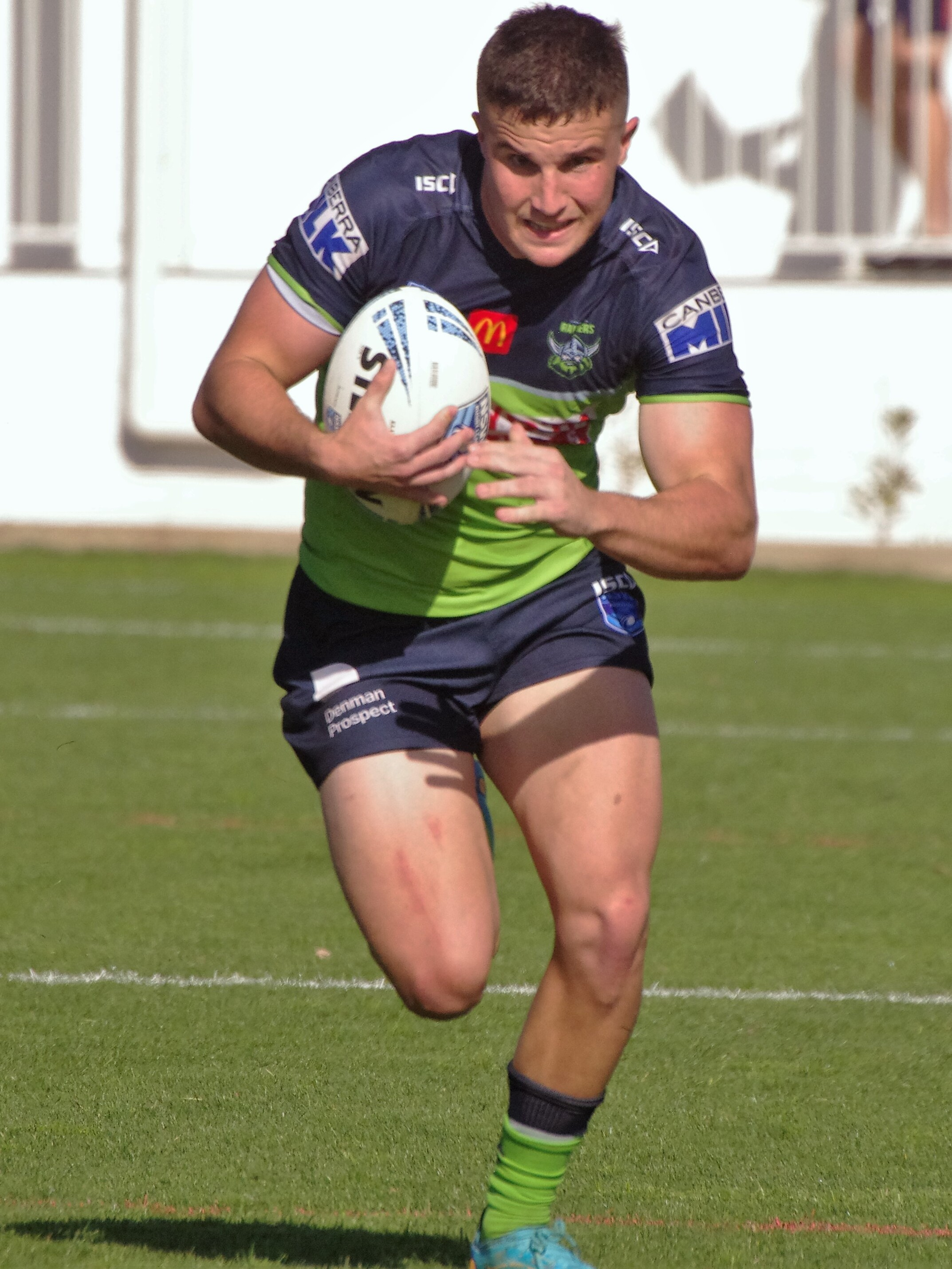

Personal information
- Full name: Joshua Smith
- Born: 18 April 2001 (age 25) Echuca, Victoria, Australia
- Height: 6 ft 0 in (1.84 m)
- Weight: 14 st 11 lb (94 kg)

Playing information
- Position: Wing, Centre
Club
Years	Team	Pld	T	G	FG	P
2026–	Warrington Wolves	12	8	0	0	32
- Source: As of 24 September 2026

Josh Smith (born 18 April 2001) is an Australian professional rugby league footballer who plays as a winger or centre for the Warrington Wolves in the Betfred Super League.

== Background ==
Smith was born in Echuca, Victoria and raised in Mackay, Queensland, Australia.

He played for the Mackay Brothers as a junior.

Smith has studied for a Bachelor of Secondary Education.

== Early career ==
Smith played for the Northern Marlins in the 2017 QRL State Championship.

He played for the Mackay Cutters at under 18 level in the 2019 Mal Meninga Cup. He played for their Colts side between 2019 and 2021.

== Career ==
Smith played for the Mackay Cutters in the 2021 Queensland Cup, scoring 10 tries in 17 games. He was contracted to the North Queensland Cowboys at that time.

That form earned him a move to the Australian Capital Territory to play for the Canberra Raiders Jersey Flegg side for the 2022 season.

Smith returned to Mackay ahead of the 2023 Queensland Cup. He scored 22 tries in 40 games over the course of the 2023 and 2024 seasons for the Cutters.

He moved to the Brisbane Tigers ahead the 2025 Queensland Cup, scoring 10 tries in 20 games.

Smith moved to the Warrington Wolves ahead of the 2026 Super League season, signing a two-year deal at the Halliwell Jones Stadium. He made his début for the Wire in the Challenge Cup against the Sheffield Eagles in February 2026.
