= Toby King (rugby league) =

England and Ireland international rugby league footballer

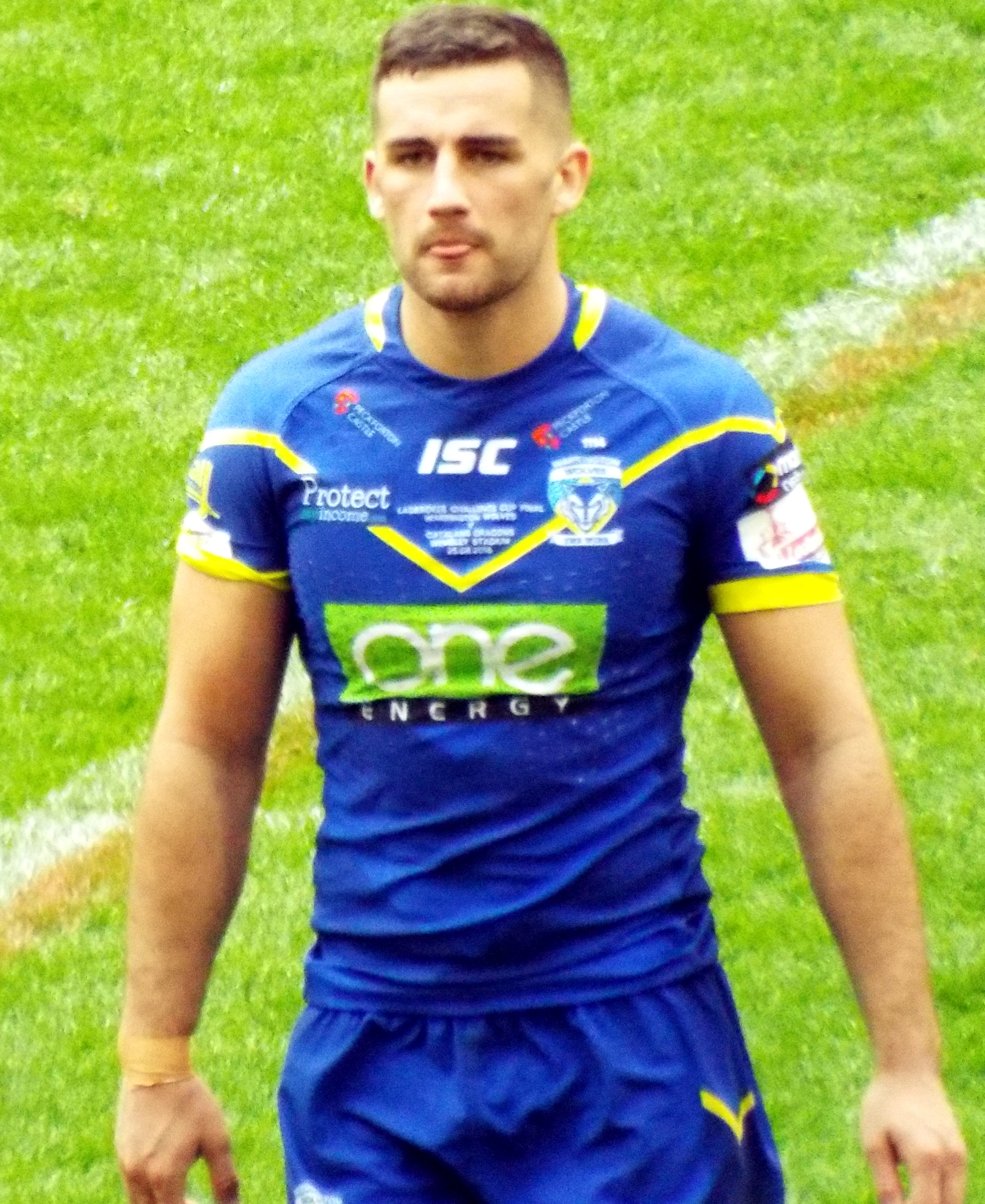

Personal information
- Full name: Toby Liam James King
- Born: 9 July 1996 (age 30) Huddersfield, West Yorkshire, England
- Height: 6 ft 3 in (1.91 m)
- Weight: 15 st 8 lb (99 kg)

Playing information
- Position: Centre
Club
Years	Team	Pld	T	G	FG	P
2014–26	Warrington Wolves	213	84	0	0	336
2016(loan)	→ Rochdale Hornets	1	1	0	0	4
2018(loan)	→ Rochdale Hornets	1	0	0	0	0
2022(loan)	→ Huddersfield Giants	12	2	0	0	8
2023(loan)	→ Wigan Warriors	31	12	0	0	48
2027–	London Broncos	0	0	0	0	0
	Total	258	99	0	0	396
Representative
Years	Team	Pld	T	G	FG	P
2016–22	Ireland	4	2	0	0	8
2018–19	England Knights	3	1	0	0	4
2023	England	3	1	0	0	4
- Source: As of 8 October 2026
- Relatives: George King (brother)

Toby King (born 9 July 1996) is a professional rugby league footballer who plays as a centre for the London Broncos in the Super League. He has played for Ireland, England and the England Knights at international level.

He has played for the Warrington Wolves in the Super League, and spent time on loan from Warrington at the Rochdale Hornets in the Championship, as well as season-long loans at both the Huddersfield Giants and the Wigan Warriors in the Betfred Super League.

King made his England debut on 29 April 2023 in the 64-0 victory over France at the Halliwell Jones Stadium.

== Background ==
King was born in Huddersfield, West Yorkshire, England.

== Club career ==
Toby is the younger brother of Adam and George King, and they played amateur rugby league together at Meltham All Blacks. They were spotted by the Wires’ Yorkshire scout Tommy Gleeson after both appeared for Huddersfield.

=== Warrington ===
King was promoted to Warrington first team squad in 2014. King made his début in July 2014 during a 72–10 victory over London, which was his only appearance in 2014. King next appeared in April 2015, scoring twice in an 80–0 rout against Wakefield Trinity.

King played in the 2016 Challenge Cup Final defeat by Hull F.C. at Wembley Stadium. King played in the 2016 Super League Grand Final defeat by Wigan at Old Trafford. King played in the 2018 Challenge Cup Final defeat by the Catalans Dragons at Wembley Stadium. King played in the 2019 Challenge Cup Final victory over St. Helens at Wembley Stadium. On 13 October 2018, King played in the 2018 Super League Grand Final defeat by Wigan at Old Trafford. On 7 June 2025, King played in Warrington's 8-6 Challenge Cup final loss against Hull Kingston Rovers. On 3 October 2026, King played in the 2026 Super League Grand Final, which Warrington lost to Wakefield Trinity 23-10.

=== Huddersfield Giants (loan) ===
On 25 June 2022 it was announced that he would join the Huddersfield Giants for the remainder of the 2022 season.

=== Wigan Warriors (loan) ===
In August 2022 it was announced that King had signed for the Wigan Warriors on a season-long loan deal. On 14 October 2023, King played in Wigan's 2023 Super League Grand Final victory over the Catalans Dragons. On 8 June 2024, King played in Warrington's 2024 Challenge Cup final defeat against Wigan.

=== London Broncos ===
King will join the London Broncos ahead of the 2027 Super League season.

== International career ==
In 2016 King was called up to the Ireland squad for the 2017 Rugby League World Cup European Pool B qualifiers.

In 2018 placed for England Knights on their tour of Papua New Guinea, playing both matches against Papua New Guinea. In 2019, he once again placed for England Knights against Jamaica at Headingley Rugby Stadium.

King placed for Ireland in the 2021 World Cup.

== Honours ==
=== Warrington Wolves ===
- League Leaders' Shield
  - Winners (1): 2016
- Challenge Cup
  - Winners (1): 2019

=== Wigan Warriors (loan) ===
- Super League
  - Winners (1): 2023
- League Leaders' Shield
  - Winners (1): 2023
