= Danny Walker =

England international rugby league footballer (born 1999)

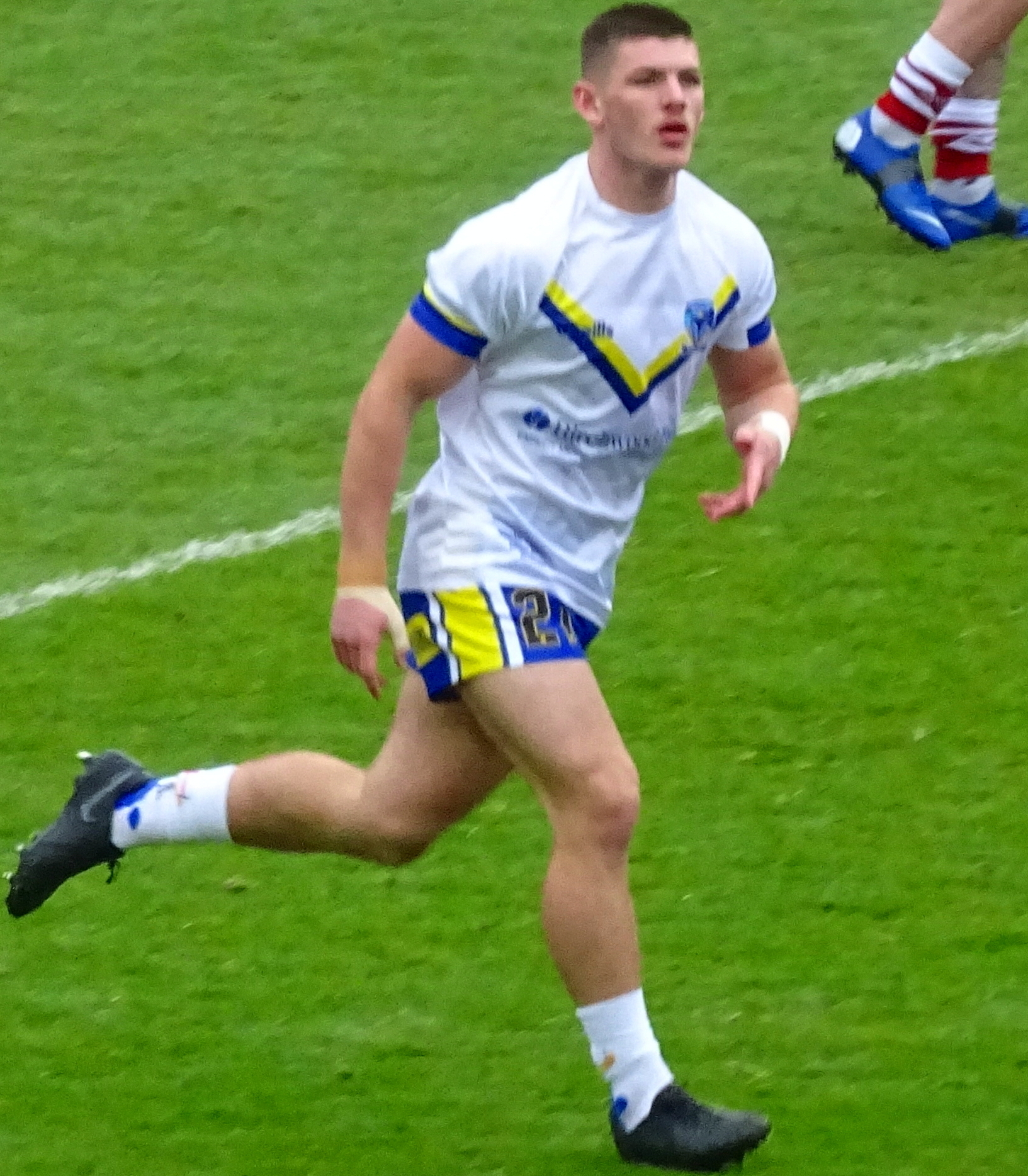

Personal information
- Full name: Danny Joe Walker
- Born: 29 June 1999 (age 27) Warrington, Cheshire, England
- Height: 5 ft 8 in (1.73 m)
- Weight: 13 st 2 lb (83 kg)

Playing information
- Position: Hooker
Club
Years	Team	Pld	T	G	FG	P
2017–18	Widnes Vikings	30	3	0	0	12
2019–	Warrington Wolves	155	20	0	0	80
2019(loan)	→ Rochdale Hornets	1	0	0	0	0
	Total	186	23	0	0	92
Representative
Years	Team	Pld	T	G	FG	P
2018–	England Knights	3	1	0	0	4
2023–	England	3	1	0	0	4
- Source: As of 30 March 2026

Danny Walker (born 29 June 1999) is an English professional rugby league footballer who plays as a hooker for the Warrington Wolves in the Super League and both England and the England Knights at international level.

He played for the Widnes Vikings in the Super League, and has spent time on loan from Warrington at the Rochdale Hornets in the Championship.

== Background ==
Walker was born in Warrington, Cheshire, England. He was educated at Beamont Collegiate Academy, Warrington.

== Career ==
=== Widnes Vikings ===
In 2017 he made his Super League début for the Widnes Vikings against the Leigh Centurions.

=== Warrington Wolves ===
After the conclusion of Season 2018 where the Vikings were relegated, he subsequently signed a three-year deal with his home town club Warrington Wolves starting from the 2019 season. Walker played 23 games in the 2022 Super League season for Warrington which saw the club finish 11th on the table and narrowly avoid relegation. Walker played 28 games for Warrington in the 2023 Super League season as Warrington finished sixth on the table and qualified for the playoffs. He played in the clubs elimination playoff loss against St Helens. On 8 June 2024, Walker played in Warrington's 2024 Challenge Cup final loss against Wigan. Walker played 27 matches for Warrington in the 2024 Super League season as the club reached the semi-final before losing to Hull Kingston Rovers. On 3 October 2026, Walker played in the 2026 Super League Grand Final, which Warrington lost to Wakefield Trinity 23-10.

== International career ==
In July 2018 he was selected in the England Knights Performance squad. Later that year he was selected for the England Knights on their tour of Papua New Guinea. He played against Papua New Guinea at the Oil Search National Football Stadium.
