= James Harrison (rugby league) =

England international rugby league footballer

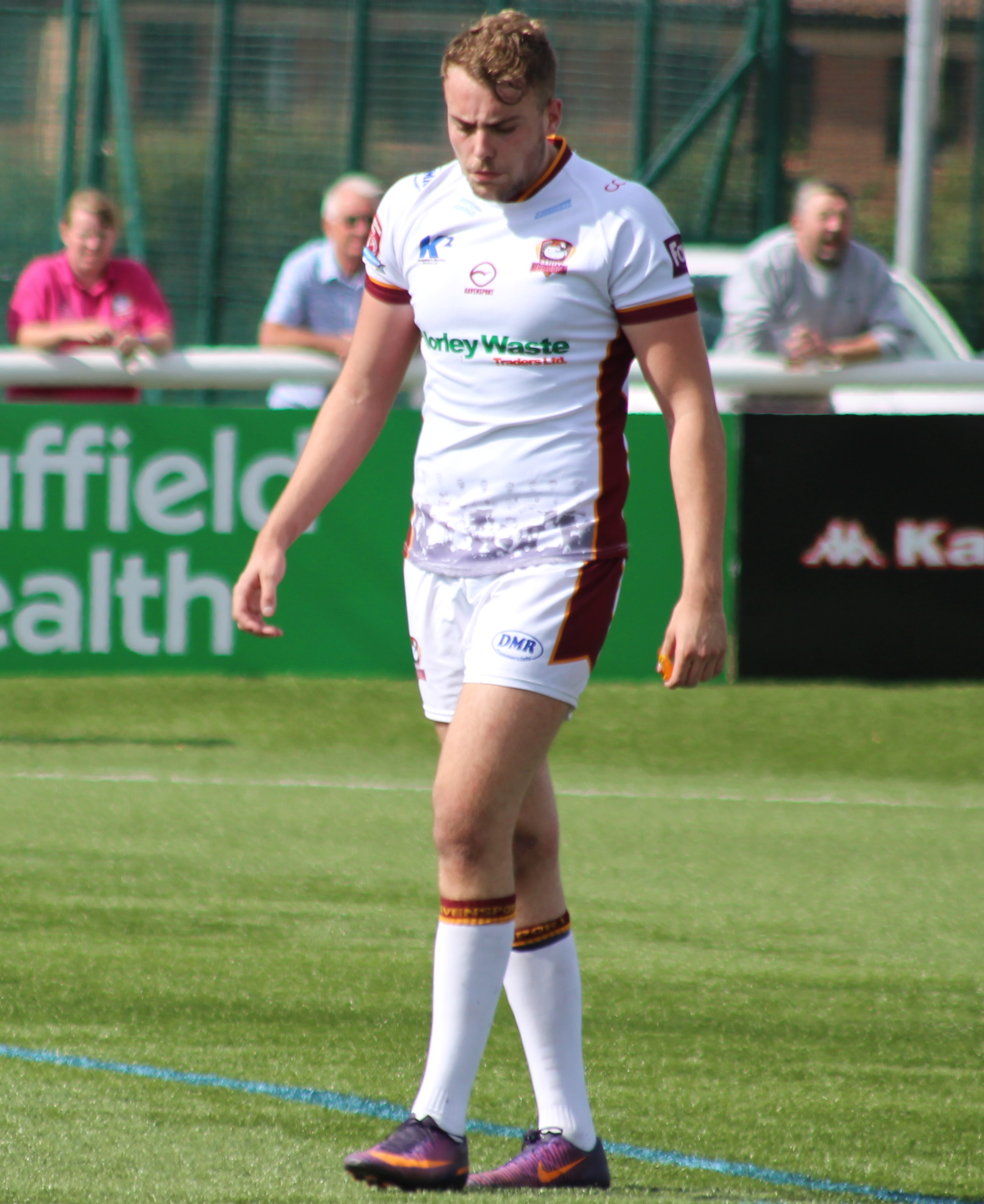

Personal information
- Full name: James Harrison
- Born: 15 June 1996 (age 30) Leeds, West Yorkshire, England
- Height: 6 ft 4 in (1.94 m)
- Weight: 16 st 5 lb (104 kg)

Playing information
- Position: Second-row, Prop, Loose forward
Club
Years	Team	Pld	T	G	FG	P
2016–18	Batley Bulldogs	58	17	0	0	68
2016(loan)	→ Oxford	3	0	0	0	0
2019–21	Featherstone Rovers	47	19	0	0	76
2020(loan)	→ Leeds Rhinos	4	0	0	0	0
2022–	Warrington Wolves	101	18	0	0	72
	Total	213	54	0	0	216
Representative
Years	Team	Pld	T	G	FG	P
2023	England	1	0	0	0	0
- Source: As of 29 April 2023
- Father: Karl Harrison

James Harrison (born 15 June 1996) is a rugby league footballer who plays as a second-row, prop or loose forward for the Warrington Wolves in the Super League.

He previously played for Featherstone Rovers and had two spells at the Batley Bulldogs all in the Championship, and played at Oxford in League 1 when on loan from Batley . Harrison has also played on loan from Featherstone at the Leeds Rhinos in the Super League.

== Background ==
Harrison was born in Leeds, West Yorkshire, England.

He is the son of former England international and Super League coach Karl Harrison.

== Playing career ==
As a junior, James began his career at Drighlington ARLFC, he then went on to join the Huddersfield Giants scholarship before a successful spell at the Bradford Bulls, where he was highly rated.

Harrison came through the youth academy at the Bradford Bulls.

=== Batley Bulldogs ===
In November 2015, at the age of 19 Harrison signed for championship side Batley Bulldogs. Batley’s head coach was the experienced John Kear who gave James his debut in March 2016, coming off the bench away at Dewsbury Rams to claim victory in the Heavy Woollen Derby.

Harrison claimed his first try for Batley, again coming off the bench in his home debut in a 28-10 victory over a strong Featherstone Rovers side. Harrison went on make 10 appearances for Batley in his first senior season, mostly in the back row, with 8 of those appearances coming as a substitute, scoring a total of 2 tries.

Batley accomplished one of their best league positions in years, finishing 3rd in the championship table and went on to compete in the middle 8’s. Harrison featured against both Huddersfield Giants and Salford in the middle 8 format.

In October 2016 it was announced Matt Diskin was to take over at Batley Bulldogs from 2017 after John Kear announced he would be joining Wakefield Trinity as director of rugby in 2017.

Harrison spent two seasons under head coach Diskin and featured heavily in that period mostly as a back row forward. During the two seasons Harrison made 48 appearances and scored 15 tries. At the 2018 end of season players awards night, Harrison was awarded the coaches player of the year award.

=== Featherstone Rovers ===
In September 2018 it was announced that Harrison had a signed a one-year deal at Featherstone Rovers. Following in his father’s footsteps who also played for the club, Harrison stated “I’m looking forward to the challenge of stepping up to a big club like Featherstone, who play in front of big crowds.”

Harrison's Featherstone debut came in a defeat away at Widnes Vikings in front of a crowd of 5682. Harrison had to wait to score his first points for the club, this came in defeat away at old club Bradford Bulls in the fifth round of the challenge cup. Featherstone losing by one point 27-26.

Featherstone went on to finish 5th in Championship table following the conclusion of 27 fixtures winning 17 games. Featherstone qualified for the playoffs to compete for a place in Super League. In the first playoff game, Harrison scored a try in the 34-18 victory over Leigh Centurions. Harrison scored tries in each of the following playoff victories away at York City Knights (30-4) and away at Toulouse Olympique (36-12) meaning qualification to the million pound game against Toronto Wolfpack in Canada. Harrison started in the final, Featherstone lost 24-6 to a strong Toronto side in a close game after leading at half time. The game was played in front of a record crowd of 9,974 and peaked at 246,000 viewers on live TV.

In total, Harrison made 28 appearances in 2019 scoring 7 tries.

On 30 August 2020 it was announced that Harrison would join the Leeds Rhinos on loan.

On 5 August 2021 it was announced that Harrison would join Warrington Wolves for the start of the 2022 season. On 24 August 2021, Harrison suffered an ACL injury whilst playing for Featherstone, resulting in ACL reconstruction surgery and causing him to miss the start of the 2022 season.

=== Warrington ===
Harrison played 18 games for Warrington in the 2023 Super League season as Warrington finished sixth on the table and qualified for the playoffs. Harrison played in the clubs elimination playoff loss against St Helens. On 8 June 2024, Harrison played in Warrington's 2024 Challenge Cup final defeat against Wigan. On 7 June 2025, he played in Warrington's 8-6 Challenge Cup final loss against Hull Kingston Rovers. On 3 October 2026, Harrison played in the 2026 Super League Grand Final, which Warrington lost to Wakefield Trinity 23-10.
