= Joe Philbin (rugby league) =

Great Britain and Ireland international rugby league footballer

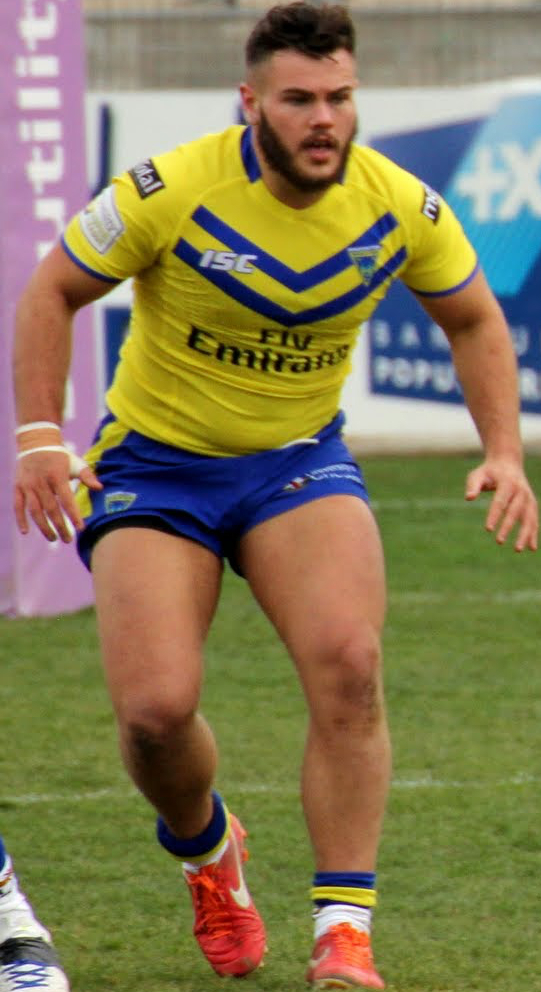

Personal information
- Full name: Joseph Patrick Philbin
- Born: 16 November 1994 (age 32) Warrington, Cheshire, England
- Height: 5 ft 11 in (1.80 m)
- Weight: 16 st 6 lb (104 kg)

Playing information
- Position: Loose forward, Second-row, Prop
Club
| Years | Team | Pld | T | G | FG | P |
|---|---|---|---|---|---|---|
| 2014–26 | Warrington Wolves | 267 | 20 | 0 | 0 | 80 |
| 2014(loan) | → Swinton Lions | 2 | 1 | 0 | 0 | 4 |
| 2015(loan) | → N Wales Crusaders | 3 | 0 | 0 | 0 | 0 |
| 2016(loan) | → Rochdale Hornets | 6 | 3 | 0 | 0 | 12 |
| 2016(loan) | → Bradford Bulls | 5 | 2 | 0 | 0 | 8 |
| 2027– | London Broncos | 0 | 0 | 0 | 0 | 0 |
| | Total | 283 | 26 | 0 | 0 | 104 |
Representative
| Years | Team | Pld | T | G | FG | P |
| 2016–25 | Ireland | 5 | 1 | 0 | 0 | 4 |
| 2018 | England Knights | 2 | 0 | 0 | 0 | 0 |
| 2019 | Great Britain | 2 | 0 | 0 | 0 | 0 |
| 2021 | England | 1 | 0 | 0 | 0 | 0 |
- Source: As of 8 October 2026

Joe Philbin (born 16 November 1994) is a professional rugby league footballer who plays as a loose forward, second-row and prop for the London Broncos in the Super League. He has played for Ireland, Great Britain and England at international level.

He has played for the Warrington Wolves in the Super League, and has spent time on loan from Warrington at the Swinton Lions and the Bradford Bulls in the Championship, and the North Wales Crusaders in Championship 1 and the Rochdale Hornets in League 1.

== Background ==
Philbin was born in Warrington, Cheshire, England.

== Playing career ==
Philbin his junior rugby at local amateur clubs Culcheth Eagles and Latchford Albion before joining Warrington Wolves, aged 16.

=== Warrington Wolves ===
He broke into the Warrington first team in 2014. His début was against Hull Kingston Rovers, where he picked up a hip injury. Philbin returned for the first team a month later against the London Broncos.

Philbin scored his first career try against the Catalans Dragons in February 2015, and the following week he scored again, this time against Hull Kingston Rovers.

Philbin played in the 2018 Challenge Cup Final defeat by the Catalans Dragons at Wembley Stadium.

Philbin played in the 2018 Super League Grand Final defeat by Wigan at Old Trafford.

Philbin played in the 2019 Challenge Cup Final victory over St. Helens at Wembley Stadium.

Philbin played 20 games for Warrington in the 2023 Super League season as Warrington finished sixth on the table and qualified for the playoffs. He played in the clubs elimination playoff loss against St Helens.

On 7 June 2025, he played in Warrington's 8-6 Challenge Cup final loss against Hull Kingston Rovers. On 3 October 2026, Philbin played in the 2026 Super League Grand Final, which Warrington lost to Wakefield Trinity 23-10.

=== Bradford ===
He was sent on a month's loan to Super League side Bradford in January 2014.

=== Swinton ===
Philbin featured in two matches via dual registration for Swinton, and scored one try.

=== London Broncos ===
Philbin joined the London Broncos ahead of the 2027 Super League season.

== International career ==
In 2016 he was called up to the Ireland squad for the 2017 Rugby League World Cup European Pool B qualifiers.

In 2018 he was selected for the England Knights on their tour of Papua New Guinea. He played against Papua New Guinea at the Lae Football Stadium and the Oil Search National Football Stadium.

He was added to the Great Britain Lions Elite Performance squad in September 2019.

He was selected in squad for the 2019 Great Britain Lions tour of the Southern Hemisphere.
