= Matty Ashton =

England international rugby league footballer

Personal information
- Full name: Matthew Ashton
- Born: 28 July 1998 (age 28) Heywood, Rochdale, Greater Manchester, England
- Height: 6 ft 2 in (1.88 m)
- Weight: 13 st 10 lb (87 kg)

Playing information
- Position: Wing, Fullback
Club
| Years | Team | Pld | T | G | FG | P |
|---|---|---|---|---|---|---|
| 2019 | Swinton Lions | 25 | 30 | 1 | 0 | 122 |
| 2020– | Warrington Wolves | 118 | 107 | 0 | 0 | 256 |
| | Total | 143 | 137 | 1 | 0 | 378 |
Representative
| Years | Team | Pld | T | G | FG | P |
| 2023– | England | 7 | 8 | 0 | 0 | 32 |
- Source: As of 16 November 2026

Matty Ashton (born 28 July 1998) is an English rugby league footballer who plays as a winger for the Warrington Wolves in the Super League and England at international level.

He previously played for Swinton Lions, where he made his professional debut in 2019. He made his debut at international level for England in 2023.

== Early life ==
Ashton grew up in Heywood, Greater Manchester, and began playing rugby league at the age of seven with Rochdale Mayfield. He later attended Hopwood Hall College, where he was coached by Matt Calland.

== Playing career ==
=== Early career ===
After playing for two seasons in Rochdale Mayfield's open age team in the National Conference League, Ashton spent a year in Australia, where he played for the Mullumbimby Giants in the Northern Rivers Regional Rugby League.

After a successful trial, Ashton signed a one-year contract with Championship side Swinton Lions in December 2018. He became the league's top try scorer during the 2019 season, scoring 30 tries in total, and won the Championship Young Player of the Year award.

=== Warrington Wolves ===
In August 2019, Ashton was signed by Super League club Warrington Wolves for an undisclosed fee. He made his Super League début for Warrington against Wigan in January 2020.

In round 5 of the 2023 Super League season, Ashton scored a hat-trick in Warrington's 38–20 victory over Leigh. Ashton played 25 games for Warrington in the 2023 Super League season and scored 18 tries as Warrington finished sixth on the table and qualified for the playoffs. Ashton played in the clubs elimination playoff loss against St Helens. On 8 June 2024, Ashton played in Warrington's 2024 Challenge Cup final defeat against Wigan. Ashton played a total of 25 games for Warrington in the 2024 Super League season and scored 27 tries as the club reached the semi-final before losing to Hull Kingston Rovers. On 3 October 2026, Ashton played in the 2026 Super League Grand Final, which Warrington lost to Wakefield Trinity 23-10.

== International career ==
On 28 October 2023 he scored two tries and won Player of the match in his second game for England v Tonga.
