= 2026 Wakefield Trinity season =

English rugby league team season

Wakefield Trinity 2026 season
- 2026 Super League champions
- 2026 Super League season Rank: 4th
- Play-off result: Champions
- Challenge Cup: Quarter-finals
- 2026 record: Wins: 21; draws: 0; losses: 9
- Points scored: For: 709; against: 486

Team information
- CEO: Craig Barrass
- Head Coach: Daryl Powell
- Captain: Mike McMeeken
- Stadium: Belle Vue
- Avg. attendance: 8,585
- High attendance: 9,258; Leeds Rhinos, 7 August
- Low attendance: 7,552; Leigh Leopards, 20 March

Top scorers
- Tries: Tom Johnstone (21)
- Goals: Max Jowitt (75)
- Points: Max Jowitt (170)
Home colours	Away colours	Third colours
← 2025	List of seasons	2027 →

The 2026 season was Wakefield Trinity's second consecutive season playing in England's top division of rugby league. They competed in the 2026 Super League season and the 2026 Challenge Cup, and in doing so, secured their first league title since 1968.

== Preseason friendlies ==
Date and time	Versus	H/A	Venue	Result	Score	Tries	Goals	Attendance	Report
26 December 2025; 11:00 (Note: Wetherby Whaler Festive Challenge)	Leeds Rhinos	A	Headingley Rugby Stadium	L	10–18	Vagana, Myers	Sinfield (1/2)	11,266	
25 January; 15:00	Hull KR	A	Craven Park	W	34–6	Nikotemo (2), Faatili, Hall, Jowitt, McGann	Jowitt (5/6)		

== Super League ==
From 2026, the Super League expanded to 14 teams, with Toulouse Olympique and York Knights being promoted from the RFL Championship via the IMG Grading system. At a meeting of all twelve Super League teams at the Headingley Rugby Stadium on 28 July 2025 to vote on the expansion proposal, Wakefield were one of nine teams to vote in favour of expanding the league.

=== Fixtures ===
Wakefield Trinity's Super League 2026 fixtures were released on 27 November 2025:

Date and Time	Round	Versus	H/A	Venue	Result	Score	Tries	Goals	Attendance	TV	Pos.	Report
14 February; 20:00	Round 1	Toulouse Olympique	H	Belle Vue	L	16–18	Rourke, Scott, Tate	Jowitt (2/3)	8,555	Sky Sports +	9th	
22 February; 15:00	Round 2	Huddersfield Giants	A	Kirklees Stadium	W	18–16	Walmsley (2), Scott, Nikotemo	Jowitt (1/4)	6,451	BBC Two; Sky Sports +	7th	
28 February; 17:30	Round 3	Warrington Wolves	A	Halliwell Jones Stadium	L	16–27	Jowitt, Myers, Pratt	Jowitt (1/3 + 1 pen.)	10,094	BBC Two; Sky Sports +	9th	
5 March; 20:00	Round 4	Hull F.C.	H	Belle Vue	W	14–10	Tate (2), Pratt	Sinfield (1/3)	8,239	Sky One; Sky Sports + Main	7th	
20 March; 20:00	Round 5	Leigh Leopards	H	Belle Vue	W	18–14	Tevaga, Myers, Pratt	Jowitt (2/3 + 1 pen.)	7,552	Sky Sports Action	6th	
27 March; 20:00	Round 6	York Knights	A	York Community Stadium	W	26–14	Pratt (2), Johnstone (2), Hamlin-Uele	Jowitt (2/4), Sinfield (1/1)	5,796	Sky Sports +	4th	
5 April; 15:00 (Easter Sunday)	Round 7 (Rivals Round)	Castleford Tigers	A	Wheldon Road	W	34–0	Trueman (2), Pratt (2), Hall, Smoothy, Scott	Jowitt (2/6 + 1 pen.), Lino (0/1)	9,455	Sky Sports +	4th	
18 April; 20:00	Round 8	Bradford Bulls	H	Belle Vue	W	52–12	Johnstone (4), Pratt (3), Scott, Rourke, Nikotemo	Sinfield (6/10)	8,608	Sky Sports +	2nd	
25 April; 17:30	Round 9	St Helens	A	BrewDog Stadium	L	12–18	Smoothy, Faatili	Sinfield (2/2)	11,059	Sky Sports +	4th	
1 May; 20:00	Round 10	Leeds Rhinos	A	Headingley Rugby Stadium	L	22–40	Myers (2), Pratt, Lolesio	Lino (3/4)	15,145	Sky Sports + Main	6th	
15 May; 20:00	Round 11	Catalans Dragons	H	Belle Vue	W	58–10	Faatili (3), Tate (2), Hamlin-Uele, Pitts, Myers, Tevaga, Pratt, Trueman	Lino (7/11)	8,532	Sky Sports +	6th	
23 May; 18:00 (BST)	Round 12	Toulouse Olympique	A	Stade Ernest Wallon	W	22–18	Pratt, Faatili, Tevaga, Nikotemo	Rourke (3/4)	3,259	Sky Sports +	5th	
6 June; 16:30 (Note: Fixture moved an hour earlier from 17:30 due to selection for live BBC broadcasting.)	Round 13	Hull KR	H	Belle Vue	W	26–24	Pratt, Scott, Rourke, Storton, Lino	Lino (3/5)	8,608	BBC Two; Sky Sports +	3rd	
12 June; 20:00	Round 14	Wigan Warriors	H	Belle Vue	L	10–48	Storton, Johnstone	Jowitt (1/2)	8,095	Sky Sports + Main	5th	
19 June; 20:00	Round 15	Hull F.C.	H	MKM Stadium	W	36–10	Johnstone (2), Nikotemo (2), McMeeken, Tevaga	Jowitt (6/6)	12,161	Sky Sports +	5th	
28 June; 15:00	Round 16	Huddersfield Giants	H	Belle Vue	W	29–23	Rourke (2), Johnstone, McMeeken, Sinfield	Jowitt (3/5 + 1 pen.); Drop-goals Sinfield	9,258	Sky Sports +	4th	
5 July; 12:30	Round 17 (Magic Weekend)	Castleford Tigers	N	Hill Dickinson Stadium	W	48–6	Scott (2), Johnstone (2), Hamlin-Uele (2), Walmsley, Smoothy, Rourke	Sinfield (6/9)	42,903	Sky Sports + Main	4th	
11 July; 17:30	Round 18	Hull KR	A	Craven Park	W	20–6	Faatili (2), Smith	Smoothy (2/3 + 2 pen.)	11,408	Sky Sports Action	3rd	
16 July; 20:00	Round 19	Bradford Bulls	A	Odsal Stadium	W	26–12	Johnstone, Tate, Pitts, Rourke, Smith	Rourke (3/5)	7,518	Sky Sports +	3rd	
24 July; 20:00	Round 20 (Rivals Round Reversed)	Castleford Tigers	H	Belle Vue	W	52–14	Johnstone (2), Walmsley (2), Storton, Faatili, Jowitt, Vagana, Hall	Jowitt (8/9)	9,158	Sky Sports + Main	2nd	
1 August; 20:00 (BST)	Round 21	Catalans Dragons	A	Stade Gilbert Brutus	W	32–12	Scott (2), Vagana (2), Trueman, Hamlin-Uele	Sinfield (4/6)	7,951	Sky Sports Action	2nd	
7 August; 20:00	Round 22	Leeds Rhinos	H	Belle Vue	L	22–24	Vagana, Hamlin-Uele, Myers, Sinfield	Sinfield (3/4)	9,258	Sky Sports Action	3rd	
15 August; 17:30	Round 23	St Helens	H	Belle Vue	L	16–46	Smoothy, Vagana, Sinfield	Sinfield (2/3)	8,597	Sky Sports Action	4th	
21 August; 20:00	Round 24	Wigan Warriors	A	Brick Community Stadium	L	12–26	Hall, Rodwell	Jowitt (2/2)	15,652	Sky Sports Action	4th	
29 August; 17:30 (Note: Fixture moved ahead from 15:00 due to selection for live BBC broadcasting.)	Round 25	York Knights	H	Belle Vue	W	28–12	Walmsley (2), Hall, Myers, Jowitt	Jowitt (3/5 + 1 pen.)	7,982	BBC Two; Sky Sports +	4th	
5 September; 15:00	Round 26	Warrington Wolves	H	Belle Vue	W	25–18	Vagana (2), Johnstone, Scott	Jowitt (4/5); Drop-goals Lino	9,057	BBC Two; Sky Sports +	4th	
11 September; 20:00	Round 27	Leigh Leopards	A	Leigh Sports Village	W	19–8	Johnstone (2), Scott	Jowitt (1/3 + 2 pen.); Drop-goals Trueman	8,868	Sky Sports +	4th	

=== Table ===
Pos	Team	Pld	W	D	L	PF	PA	PD	Pts	Qualification
1	Wigan Warriors (L)	27	22	0	5	851	439	+412	44	Advance to Semi-finals
2	Leeds Rhinos	27	20	0	7	904	426	+478	40	Advance to Semi-finals
3	Warrington Wolves (Y)	27	20	0	7	726	465	+261	40	Advance to Eliminators
4	Wakefield Trinity (C)	27	19	0	8	709	486	+223	38	Advance to Eliminators
5	Leigh Leopards	27	17	0	10	644	497	+147	34	Advance to Eliminators
6	Hull Kingston Rovers	27	16	0	11	748	503	+245	32	Advance to Eliminators
7	St Helens	27	15	0	12	636	614	+22	30	
8	Toulouse Olympique	27	10	0	17	578	704	−126	20	
9	Catalans Dragons	27	10	0	17	537	802	−265	20	
10	York Knights	27	9	0	18	545	791	−246	18	
11	Hull FC	27	8	0	19	488	597	−109	16	
12	Huddersfield Giants	27	8	0	19	509	765	−256	16	
13	Castleford Tigers	27	8	0	19	464	866	−402	16	
14	Bradford Bulls	27	7	0	20	468	852	−384	14	

Updated to match(es) played on 12 September 2026. Source:
(C) Champions; (L) League Leaders' Shield Winners; (Y) Runners up

=== Play-offs ===
Date and time	Round	Versus	H/A	Venue	Result	Score	Tries	Goals	Attendance	TV	Report
19 September; 20:00	Eliminators	Leigh Leopards	A	Leigh Sports Village	W	26–16	Smoothy, Johnstone, Vagana, Faatili	Jowitt (3/4 + 2 pen.)	9,258	Sky Sports + Main	
26 September; 17:30	Semi-finals	Wigan Warriors	A	Brick Community Stadium	W	33–6	Johnstone (2), Sinfield, Hall, Rodwell	Jowitt (4/5 + 2 pen.); Drop-goals Lino	16,724	BBC Two; Sky Sports +	
3 October; 18:00	Grand Final	Warrington Wolves	N	Old Trafford	W	23–10	Scott, Vagana, Tevaga, Johnstone	Jowitt (3/4); Drop-goals Sinfield	71,728	Sky Sports Main Event	

== Challenge Cup ==
Wakefield Trinity were first drawn on 12 January to play the Swinton Lions in Round 3, following Swinton's 44-26 defeat of Ince Rose Bridge in their Round 2 fixture on 24 January. Following their victory against Swinton, Wakefield beat the Leeds Rhinos at home 24-14 in a Round 4 match marred by a floodlight failure, entering them into the quarter-finals. Wakefield Trinity were ultimately knocked out of the 2026 Challenge Cup by eventual winners Wigan Warriors in this fixture.

Date and time	Round	Versus	H/A	Venue	Result	Score	Tries	Goals	Attendance	TV	Report
8 February; 15:00	Round 3	Swinton Lions	A	Heywood Road	W	82–6	Storton (3), Rourke (2), Jowitt (2), Scott (2), Tate, Pitts, Trueman, Smoothy, Hall	Jowitt (13/14)	918	Not televised	
13 March; 20:00	Round 4	Leeds Rhinos	H	Belle Vue	W	24–14	Smith, Pratt, Storton, Rodwell	Sinfield (4/4)	7,136	BBC iPlayer	
12 April; 13:00	Quarter-finals	Wigan Warriors	H	Belle Vue	L	22–26	Trueman, Rodwell, Johnstone, Scott	Jowitt (3/4)	8,051	BBC One	

== Transfers ==
=== Gains ===
Player	Club	Contract	Date
(Australia) Tyson Smoothy	Brisbane Broncos	1 year	February 2025
(England) Neil Tchamambe	Hull KR	2 years	March 2025
(New Zealand) Tray Lolesio	Dolphins	2 years	July 2025
(Samoa) Jazz Tevaga	Manly Warringah Sea Eagles	2 years	July 2025
(England) Jordan Williams	Featherstone Rovers	2 years	August 2025
(England) Kian McGann	St Helens	2 years	September 2025
(England) Will Tate	Castleford Tigers	1 year	October 2025
(England) Jack Sinfield	Leeds Rhinos	3 years	October 2025
(Poland) Zac Lipowicz	Catalans Dragons	End of season	August 2026
(Turkey) Emre Guler	St. George Illawarra Dragons	3 years	August 2026

=== Losses ===
Player	Club	Contract	Date
(England) Josh Griffin	York Knights	1 year	August 2025
(New Zealand) Renouf Atoni	Castleford Tigers	2 years	October 2025
(Scotland) Liam Hood	Castleford Tigers	1 year	October 2025
(France) Mathieu Cozza	Huddersfield Giants	1 year	October 2025
(England) Oliver Russell	Huddersfield Giants	1 year	November 2025
(England) Jack Croft	London Broncos	1 year	November 2025
(Scotland) Matty Russell	Oldham R.L.F.C. (Note: Russell did not play a single match for Oldham and eventually signed an end-of-season contract for Catalans Dragons in February 2026.)	1 year	December 2025
(Scotland) Thomas Doyle	York Knights	2 years	August 2026
(New Zealand) Seth Nikotemo	Released	N/A	August 2026

==== Loans out ====
Player	Club	Loan period	Date
(England) Neil Tchamambe	London Broncos	End of season	October 2025
(England) Myles Lawford	Halifax Panthers	End of season (Note: Loan terminated in February 2026 due to Halifax's liquidation.)	November 2025
(England) Myles Lawford	Halifax Panthers	Week-by-week	March 2026
(England) Kian McGann	Halifax Panthers	One week	March 2026
(England) Ellis Lingard	Dewsbury Rams	One week	March 2026
(England) Charlie Abraham	Dewsbury Rams	One week	April 2026
(England) Kian McGann	Halifax Panthers	One week	April 2026
(England) Ellis Lingard	Dewsbury Rams	One week	June 2026
(England) Jordan Williams	Batley Bulldogs	One week	July 2026
(England) Noah High	Batley Bulldogs	One week	July 2026
(England) Ellis Lingard	Dewsbury Rams	One week	July 2026

== Squad ==
2026 Wakefield Trinity Squad
First team squad			Coaching staff
1 (England) Max Jowitt – FB (gk); 2 (England) Oliver Pratt – CE; 3 (England) Cameron Scott – CE, WG, SR; 4 (England) Corey Hall – CE, SR; 5 (England) Tom Johnstone – WG; 6 (England) Jake Trueman – SO, SH, FB; 7 (Samoa) Mason Lino – SH, SO (gk); 8 (England) Mike McMeeken (c) – SR, PR; 9 (Australia) Tyson Smoothy – HK, LF (gk); 10 (Australia) Ky Rodwell – PR, LF; 12 (England) Matty Storton – SR, PR; 13 (Samoa) Jazz Tevaga – LF, HK, PR; 14 (England) Jay Pitts – SR, LF	15 (New Zealand) Caleb Hamlin-Uele – PR; 16 (New Zealand) Caius Faatili – PR; 17 (England) Harvey Smith – HK; 18 (New Zealand) Isaiah Vagana – SR, PR; 19 (Scotland) Lachlan Walmsley – WG, FB; 20 (England) Jack Sinfield – SH, SO (gk); 21 (England) Jayden Myers – WG, FB; 22 (Scotland) Thomas Doyle – HK; 23 (England) Josh Rourke – FB (gk); 24 (New Zealand) Tray Lolesio – PR; 25 (England) Jordan Williams – PR, SR; 26 (Poland) Zac Lipowicz – SR; 27 (England) Myles Lawford – SH, SO	28 (England) Noah High – PR, LF; 29 (England) Ellis Lingard – PR, SR, LF; 31 (England) Kian McGann – FB, SO, SH; 32 (England) Will Tate – CE, WG, FB; 33 (England) Charlie Abraham – LF; 34 (Turkey) Emre Guler – PR	Head coach: (England) Daryl Powell; Assistant coaches: (England) Michael Shenton; (England) Danny Kirmond; Legend: (c) Captain(s); (vc) Vice-captain(s); (red card) = suspended; = injured; (gk) = Goal kicker; Updated: 3 October 2026; Source(s): 2026 Wakefield Trinity Squad Numbers
