= 2026 Super League season =

31st season of Super League rugby

- League: Super League
- Duration: 27 rounds
- Teams: 14
- Matches played: 194
- Points scored: 8,970
- Highest attendance: 71,728; Warrington Wolves vsWakefield Trinity (3 October)
- Lowest attendance: 3,070; Toulouse Olympique vs Huddersfield Giants (15 August)
- Average attendance: 10,410
- Total attendance: 2,019,492
- Broadcast partners: Sky Sports; BBC Sport; SuperLeague+; La Dépêche; Sportdigital; TV3

2026 Season
- Champions: Wakefield Trinity (1st Super League title 3rd British title)
- League Leaders' Shield: Wigan Warriors
- Runners-up: Warrington Wolves
- Biggest home win: Warrington Wolves 72–6 Castleford Tigers (21 March)
- Biggest away win: York Knights 20–72 Wigan Warriors (20 June)
- Man of Steel: (England) Brad O'Neill (Wigan Warriors)
- Top point-scorer: (England) Jake Connor (282)
- Top try-scorer: (Fiji) Maika Sivo (29)

The 2026 Super League season, known as the 2026 Betfred Super League for sponsorship reasons, was the 31st season of the Super League and 132nd season of rugby league in Great Britain.

Hull KR were the defending champions, having beaten Wigan Warriors in the Grand Final, to win their first Super League title, but they lost to Warrington Wolves in the Elimination playoffs.

Wakefield Trinity won their first ever Super League title, defeating Warrington Wolves 23–10 in the 2026 Final.

== Rule changes ==
=== Conversion and penalty kicks ===
A 60 second shot clock for conversion and penalty kicks will be introduced from 2026, starting from the confirmation of a try. The shot clock will be stopped and not restarted if the kicking process is 'corrupted', i.e. if the ball falls off the kicking tee, giving a kicker indefinite time.

=== Overseas player quotas and dual registration ===
In July 2025, it was confirmed by the RFL that each Super League team's overseas player quota, limiting a team's maximum amount of registered players not trained by a Rugby League European Federation member club, would increase from seven to ten for the 2026 season.

In January 2026, the RFL announced that the dual registration system, allowing for Super League clubs to register their players with a lower league club to allow them to be loaned on short notice, was to be scrapped in order to "increase players' opportunities of taking the field". As a replacement, Super League clubs were permitted to send players on one-week loans to "partner clubs" with the aim of improving reserve players' match appearances. Clubs that had benefitted from dual registration partnerships included Leeds Rhinos, who had partnered with Featherstone Rovers, and St Helens R.F.C., who had partnered with Halifax Panthers.

=== Video referee ===
On-field try decisions referred to the video referee, which previously stopped the game clock upon a referee's whistle, are to be abolished from 2026 onwards. These will be replaced by a 'live review' system, similar to the one used in the NRL, in which 80 seconds of a video referee's review must pass before the game clock can be stopped. If reason is found for an on-field try decision to be overturned by the video referee, resulting in a 'no try', the game clock is reset to the moment of the blowing of the referee's whistle.

== Structure changes ==
=== League expansion ===
From 2026, the Super League expanded to 14 teams. Teams 1-12 were decided by the current IMG promotion and relegation system, while teams 13 and 14 were chosen from the RFL Championship by an independent panel assessing teams who meet the minimum criteria. At a meeting of all twelve Super League teams at the Headingley Rugby Stadium on 28 July 2025 to vote on the expansion proposal, nine voted to approve expanding the league, with only Hull KR and Hull FC voting against while Wigan Warriors abstained from the vote.

=== "Spare weekend" ===
With the expansion from 12 to 14 teams came the removal of the five loop fixtures, which originally included Magic Weekend. This would have reduced the regular season from 27 to 26 rounds. The RFL had planned to use the spare week for an expanded playoff format which would take place over four weeks rather than three. However, a U-turn decision saw Magic Weekend retained for 2026 and played as the season's only loop fixture, and retained a 27 round regular season. A mid-season international between England and Papua New Guinea was also proposed.

== Broadcasting ==
BBC Sport are broadcasting matches as well as match highlights in the final year of their three-year deal with the Super League, replacing Channel 4 as the league's free-to-air partner from the 2024 season. Ten games per season will be shown live on television, with a further five shown on iPlayer, the BBC's streaming platform. Australian broadcaster Foxtel is continuing an extended deal signed with the Super League in 2025 to broadcast every match on their Fox League channel and their Kayo Sports streaming service.

Deals were announced by the Super League in February 2026 with French news group La Dépêche's 'Rugbyrama' platform, who will broadcast 51 Catalans Dragons and Toulouse Olympique matches, and with the National Broadcasting Corporation of Papua New Guinea, who will broadcast matches for New Zealand, Papua New Guinea and other Pacific Island nations. These join preexisting deals with Catalan-language broadcaster TV3, German-language broadcaster Sportdigital, and other worldwide broadcasters such as Fox Sports in the United States, Rogers Sports & Media in Canada, Rush Sports in the Caribbean, Premier Sports Asia in South East Asia and Dubai TV.

== Teams ==
The league consists of 14 teams, an increase of two from the previous season. The regular season consists of 27 rounds.

Hull KR are the defending champions after winning the 2025 Grand Final. Salford Red Devils, who finished bottom of the Super League table in 2025 following a season marred by financial difficulties, were relegated to the 2026 RFL Championship after not applying to join the Super League for 2026. They were replaced by 2025 RFL Championship semi-finalists Bradford Bulls, who were promoted to the Super League after achieving the highest IMG Grade B rating for 2025. Bradford were joined by fellow Championship teams Toulouse Olympique and York Knights for the 2026 season, each achieving Grade B rankings.

2026 Super League clubs
1 Bradford Bulls
2 Castleford Tigers
3 Catalans Dragons
4 Huddersfield Giants
5 Hull F.C.
6 Hull Kingston Rovers
7 Leeds Rhinos
8 Leigh Leopards
9 St Helens
10 Toulouse Olympique
11 Wakefield Trinity
12 Warrington Wolves
13 Wigan Warriors
14 York Knights

Legend
Reigning Champions	Previous season runners-up	Previous season League Leaders	Promoted

Team	Head coach	Captain	Stadium	Capacity	Grading
Bradford Bulls	(Ireland) Kurt Haggerty	(England) Joe Mellor	Bartercard Odsal Stadium	26,019	B
Castleford Tigers	(England) Chris Chester (interim)	(England) Alex Mellor	OneBore Stadium	12,000	B
Catalans Dragons	(Australia) John Cartwright	(France) Benjamin Garcia	Stade Gilbert Brutus	13,000	A
Huddersfield Giants	(Australia) Jim Lenihan	(Australia) Adam Clune	Accu Stadium	24,121	B
Hull FC	(England) Andy Last (interim)	(Australia) Aiden Sezer	MKM Stadium	25,400	A
Hull Kingston Rovers	(Australia) Willie Peters	(England) Elliot Minchella	Sewell Group Craven Park	12,500	A
Leeds Rhinos	(Australia) Brad Arthur	(England) Ash Handley	AMT Headingley Rugby Stadium	21,062	A
Leigh Leopards	(Papua New Guinea) Adrian Lam	(Papua New Guinea) Lachlan Lam (New Zealand) Isaac Liu	The Progress With Unity Stadium	12,000	A
St Helens	(Ireland) Eamon O'Carroll (interim)	(England) Matty Lees	BrewDog Stadium	18,000	A
Toulouse Olympique	(France) Sylvain Houles	(France) Anthony Marion	Stade Ernest-Wallon	19,500	B
Wakefield Trinity	(England) Daryl Powell	(England) Mike McMeeken	DIY Kitchens Stadium	9,333	A
Warrington Wolves	(England) Sam Burgess	(England) George Williams	Halliwell Jones Stadium	15,200	A
Wigan Warriors	(England) Matt Peet	(England) Liam Farrell	Brick Community Stadium	25,133	A
York Knights	(England) Mark Applegarth	(England) Liam Harris (Australia) Jesse Dee	York Community Stadium	8,500	B

== Fixtures and results ==
=== Matches decided by golden point ===
If a match ends in a draw after 80 minutes, then a further 10 minutes of golden point extra time is played, to determine a winner (five minutes each way). The first team to score either a try, penalty goal or drop goal during this period, will win the match. However, if there are no further scores during the additional 10 minutes period, then the match will end in a draw.

==== Game 1: Leigh Leopards v Toulouse Olympique ====
The Round 6 fixture between Leigh Leopards and Toulouse Olympique on 28 March finished 20–20 after 80 minutes. The game then went to extra time and Gareth O'Brien kicked the winning drop goal for Leigh, ending the game 21–20.

== Table ==
Pos	Team	Pld	W	D	L	PF	PA	PD	Pts	Qualification
1	Wigan Warriors (L)	27	22	0	5	851	439	+412	44	Advance to Semi-finals
2	Leeds Rhinos	27	20	0	7	904	426	+478	40	Advance to Semi-finals
3	Warrington Wolves (Y)	27	20	0	7	726	465	+261	40	Advance to Eliminators
4	Wakefield Trinity (C)	27	19	0	8	709	486	+223	38	Advance to Eliminators
5	Leigh Leopards	27	17	0	10	644	497	+147	34	Advance to Eliminators
6	Hull Kingston Rovers	27	16	0	11	748	503	+245	32	Advance to Eliminators
7	St Helens	27	15	0	12	636	614	+22	30	
8	Toulouse Olympique	27	10	0	17	578	704	−126	20	
9	Catalans Dragons	27	10	0	17	537	802	−265	20	
10	York Knights	27	9	0	18	545	791	−246	18	
11	Hull FC	27	8	0	19	488	597	−109	16	
12	Huddersfield Giants	27	8	0	19	509	765	−256	16	
13	Castleford Tigers	27	8	0	19	464	866	−402	16	
14	Bradford Bulls	27	7	0	20	468	852	−384	14	

Updated to match(es) played on 12 September 2026. Source:
(C) Champions; (L) League Leaders' Shield Winners; (Y) Runners up

== Play-offs ==
=== Team bracket ===
Eliminators
3	Warrington	35
6	Hull KR	12
4	Wakefield	26
5	Leigh	16

Semi-finals
1	Wigan	6
4	Wakefield	33
2	Leeds	12
3	Warrington	14

Grand Final
3	Warrington	10
4	Wakefield	23

=== Week 1: Eliminators ===
18 September 2026
20:00 BST (UTC+01)

Wakefield Trinity	26–16	Leigh Leopards
Tries: Smoothy 18'; Johnstone 29'; Vagana 46' Faatili 51'; Goals: Jowitt (5/6); Sent off: Guler (red card) 60'	1st: 12–6; 2nd: 14–10; Report	Tries: Armstrong 40'; Lam 65'; I. Senior 78'; Goals: Cook (2/3)

DIY Kitchens Stadium
Attendance: 9,258
Referee: Chris Kendall
Player of the Match: Tyson Smoothy

Team details
Wakefield Trinity		Position	Leigh Leopards
Name	Number	Position	Number	Name
Max Jowitt 5', 19', 47', 53', 73'	1	FB	1	David Armstrong 40'
Lachlan Walmsley	19	WG	19	Innes Senior 78'
Cameron Scott	3	CE	23	Andrew Badrock
Corey Hall	4	CE	4	Umyla Hanley
Tom Johnstone 29'	5	WG	5	Josh Charnley
Jake Trueman	6	SO	6	Adam Cook 40', 66'
Mason Lino	7	SH	7	Lachlan Lam 65'
Jazz Tevaga (substituted off) 25'	13	PR	8	Joe Ofahengaue (substituted off) 34', (substituted on) 57'
Isaiah Vagana 46'	18	HK	17	Liam Horne (substituted off) 25'
Mike McMeeken	8	PF	12	Owen Trout
Ky Rodwell (substituted off) 24', (substituted on) 58'	10	SR	15	Jacob Alick-Wiencke (substituted off) 31', (substituted on) 42'
Tyson Smoothy 18'	9	SR	22	Jack Hughes
Emre Guler (red card) 60'	34	LF	13	Isaac Liu (substituted off) 50'
Jay Pitts	14	IN	25	Louis Brogan (substituted on) 31', (substituted off) 57'
Caleb Hamlin-Uele (substituted on) 24'	15	IN	16	Matt Davis (substituted on) 42'
Caius Faatili (substituted on) 25', 51', (substituted off) 58'	16	IN	32	Jack Ashworth (substituted on) 50'
Zac Lipowicz	26	IN	9	Edwin Ipape (substituted on) 25'
Daryl Powell		Coach		Adrian Lam

19 September 2026
17:30 BST (UTC+01)

Warrington Wolves	35–12	Hull KR
Tries: Currie 4'; Ashton 39', 44', 59'; Hopoate 65'; King 78'; Goals: Irwin 5', 11', 60', 65', 79' (5/6); Drop goals: Williams 75'	1st: 12–6; 2nd: 23–6; Report	Tries: Burgess 37'; Hadley 57'; Goals: Mourgue 38', 58' (2/2); Sent off: Hiku (red card) 43'

Halliwell Jones Stadium
Attendance: 11,073
Referee: Aaron Moore

Team details
Warrington Wolves		Position	Hull KR
Name	Number	Position	Number	Name
Josh Thewlis	2	FB	1	Arthur Mourgue
Hopoate 65'	4	WG	2	Tom Davies (substituted off) 2', (substituted on) 20'
Arron Lindop	23	CE	3	Peta Hiku (red card) 43'
Toby King 78'	3	CE	4	Oliver Gildart
Ashton 39', 44', 59'	5	WG	5	Joe Burgess
George Williams	6	SO	6	Mikey Lewis
Irwin 5', 11', 60', 65', 79'	18	SH	7	Tyrone May
Liam Byrne (substituted off) 20', (substituted on) 57'	16	PR	8	Sauaso Sue (substituted off) 22', (substituted on) 64', (substituted on) 70'
Danny Walker (substituted off) 76'	9	HK	9	Jez Litten
James Harrison (substituted off) 28'	10	PF	11	Dean Hadley
Sam Stone (substituted off) 70'	12	SR	12	James Batchelor (substituted off) 78'
James Bentley (substituted off) 30', (substituted on) 55'	20	SR	13	Elliot Minchella (substituted off) 28', (substituted on) 70'
Ben Currie	13	LF	16	Jai Whitbread
Luke Yates (substituted on) 20'	8	IN	10	Tom Amone (substituted on) 22', (substituted off) 49', (substituted on) 78'
Leon Hayes (substituted on) 78'	19	IN	14	Jack Broadbent (substituted on) 2', (substituted off) 20'
Joe Philbin (substituted on) 28', (substituted off) 57'	19	IN	15	Sam Luckley (substituted on) 49', (substituted on) 64'
Kelepi Tanginoa (substituted on) 30', (substituted off) 55', (substituted on) 70'	34	IN	19	Karl Lawton (substituted on) 23'
Sam Burgess		Coach		Willie Peters

=== Week 2: Semi-finals ===
25 September 2026
20:00 BST (UTC+01)

Leeds Rhinos	12–14	Warrington Wolves
Tries: Hall 17'; Connor 33'; Goals: Connor (2/2)	1st: 12–12; 2nd: 0–2; Report	Tries: Bentley 5'; Yates 37'; Goals: Irwin 6', 38', 65' (3/3)

Headingley
Attendance: 16,621
Referee: Chris Kendall

Team details
Leeds Rhinos		Position	Warrington Wolves
Name	Number	Position	Number	Name
Fergus McCormack	28	FB	2	Josh Thewlis
Ryan Hall 17'	5	WG	4	Albert Hopoate
Ned McCormack	24	CE	23	Arron Lindop
Harry Newman	3	CE	3	Toby King
Riley Lumb	22	WG	5	Matty Ashton
Brodie Croft (substituted off) 50', (substituted on) 66'	6	SO	6	George Williams
Jake Connor 18', 33', 34'	7	SH	18	Ewan Irwin 6', 38', 65'
Mikołaj Olędzki (substituted off) 24', (substituted on) 61', (substituted off) 71'	8	PR	16	Liam Byrne (substituted off) 24', (substituted on) 52', (substituted off) 68'
Jarrod O'Connor	9	HK	9	Danny Walker (substituted off) 70'
Matt Lodge (substituted off) 19', (substituted off) 34', (substituted on) 52', (substituted off) 65'	31	PF	10	James Harrison (substituted off) 27', (substituted on) 56'
Kallum Watkins (substituted off) 66'	11	SR	20	James Bentley 5', (substituted off) 30'
James McDonnell	12	SR	12	Sam Stone
Keenan Palasia (substituted on) 71'	13	LF	13	Ben Currie
Cooper Jenkins	15	IN	8	Luke Yates (substituted on) 24', 37', (substituted off) 52', (substituted on) 68', (substituted off) 78'
Tom Holroyd (substituted on) 24', (substituted off) 34', (substituted on) 52', (substituted off) 65'	10	IN	14	Sam Powell (substituted on) 70'
Cameron Smith (substituted on) 19'	17	IN	22	Joe Philbin (substituted on) 27', (substituted off) 56', (substituted on) 78'
Presley Cassell (substituted on) 50'	20	IN	17	Kelepi Tanginoa (substituted on) 30'
Brad Arthur		Coach		Sam Burgess

26 September 2026
17:30 BST (UTC+01)

Wigan Warriors	6–33	Wakefield Trinity
Tries: O'Neill 19'; Goals: Keighran 20' (1/1); Sin bin: Keighran (yellow card) 46' to 56'	1st: 6–8; 2nd: 0–25; Report	Tries: Johnstone 30', 47'; Sinfield 51'; Hall 53'; Rodwell 59'; Goals: Jowitt 31', 52', 54', 60' 34', 79'(pen); Drop goals: Lino 71'; Sin bin: Tevaga (yellow card) 15' to 25'

Brick Community Stadium
Attendance: 16,724
Referee: Liam Moore
Touch judges: Mark Craven & Matty Lynn
Player of the Match: Max Jowitt

Team details
Wigan Warriors		Position	Wakefield Trinity
Name	Number	Position	Number	Name
Jai Field	1	FB	1	Max Jowitt 31', 52', 54', 60', 34', 79'(pen)
Austin Daniel	38	WG	19	Lachlan Walmsley
Adam Keighran 20', (yellow card) 46' to 56'	3	CE	3	Cameron Scott
Zach Eckersley	2	CE	4	Corey Hall 53'
Liam Marshall	5	WG	5	Tom Johnstone 30', 47'
Bevan French	6	SO	6	Jake Trueman
Harry Smith	7	SH	20	Jack Sinfield 51', (substituted off) 65'
Ethan Havard (substituted off) 24', (substituted on) 61'	8	PR	13	Jazz Tevaga (yellow card) 15' to 25', (substituted off) 55'
Brad O'Neill	9	HK	18	Isaiah Vagana
Luke Thompson (substituted off) 18', (substituted on) 28', (substituted off) 49', (substituted on) 70'	10	PF	26	Zac Lipowicz
Junior Nsemba	11	SR	10	Ky Rodwell (substituted off) 21', (substituted on) 41', 59', (substituted off) 61'
Oliver Partington (substituted off) 70'	17	SR	9	Tyson Smoothy
Kaide Ellis (substituted off) 57'	13	LF	8	Mike McMeeken (substituted off) 20', (substituted on) 61'
Liam Farrell (substituted on) 49'	12	IN	7	Mason Lino (substituted on) 65', (goal) drop goal', 71'
Sam Walters (substituted on) 24', (substituted off) 61'	14	IN	14	Jay Pitts (substituted on) 55'
Patrick Mago (substituted on) 18', (substituted off) 28', (substituted on) 57', (substituted off) 70'	15	IN	15	Caleb Hamlin-Uele (substituted on) 20', (substituted off) 41'
Taylor Kerr (substituted on) 70'	25	IN	16	Caius Faatili (substituted on) 21', (substituted off) 61'
(England) Matt Peet		Coach		(England) Daryl Powell

=== Week 3: Grand Final ===
3 October 2026
18:00 BST (UTC+01:00)

Warrington Wolves	10–23	Wakefield Trinity
Tries: Lindop 46', 72'; Goals: Irwin 47'	1st: 0–19; 2nd: 10–4; Report	Tries: Scott 11'; Vagana 25'; Tevaga 35'; Johnstone 59'; Goals: Jowitt 12', 26', 36'; Drop goals: Sinfield 38'; Sin bin: Hall (yellow card) 42' to 52'

Old Trafford, Manchester
Attendance: 71,728
Referee: Liam Moore
Touch judges: Marcus Griffiths
Matty Lynn
Rob Burrow Award: Tom Johnstone

Warrington Wolves		Position	Wakefield Trinity	
2	Josh Thewlis	Fullback	1	Max Jowitt 13', 26', 36'
4	Albert Hopoate	Wing	5	Tom Johnstone 59'
23	Arron Lindop 46', 72'	Centre	4	Corey Hall (yellow card) 42' to 52'
3	Toby King	Centre	3	Cameron Scott
5	Matty Ashton	Wing	19	Lachlan Walmsley
6	George Wiillliams	Scrum-half	6	Jake Trueman
18	Ewan Irwin 49'	Stand-off	20	Jack Sinfield (substituted off) 60'
16	Liam Byrne (substituted off) 18'	Prop	8	Mike McMeeken
9	Danny Walker (substituted off) 59', (substituted on) 75'	Hooker	9	Tyson Smoothy
10	James Harrison (substituted off) 23', (substituted on) 54'	Prop	10	Ky Rodwell (substituted off) 20', (substituted on) 59'
12	Sam Stone (substituted off) 62'	Second-row	26	Zac Lipowicz (substituted off) 26'
20	James Bentley (substituted off) 27', (substituted on) 62'	Second-row	18	Isaiah Vagana (substituted off) 70'
13	Ben Currie (substituted off) 69'	Loose forward	13	Jazz Tevaga (substituted off) 7', (substituted on) 23', (substituted off) 51', (substituted on) 66'
8	Luke Yates (substituted on) 18', (substituted off) 75'	Interchange	7	Mason Lino (substituted on) 60'
14	Sam Powell (substituted on) 59'	Interchange	14	Jay Pitts (substituted on) 7', (substituted off) 23', (substituted on) 51'
22	Joe Philbin (substituted on) 23' (substituted off) 54' (substituted on) 69'	Interchange	15	Caleb Hamlin-Uele (substituted on) 20' (substituted off) 66'
34	Kelepi Tanginoa (substituted on) 27'	Interchange	16	Caius Faatili (substituted on) 20' (substituted off) 59' (substituted on) 70'
	(England) Sam Burgess	Head coach		(England) Daryl Powell

== Player statistics ==
=== Top try scorer ===
Rank	Player	Club	Tries
1	(Fiji) Maika Sivo	Leeds Rhinos	29

=== Top goal scorer ===
Rank	Player	Club	Goals	Missed Goals	Drop Goals	Goal Percentage %
1	(England) Jake Connor	Leeds Rhinos	131	28	0	82%

=== Top points scorer ===
Rank	Player	Club	Points
1	(England) Jake Connor	Leeds Rhinos	278

As of 11 September 2026 (Round 27)

== Discipline ==
=== (red card) Red cards ===
Rank	Player	Club	Red cards
1	(England) Matty Storton	Wakefield Trinity	2
2	(England) Eliot Peposhi	Bradford Bulls	1
2	(France) Franck Maria	Catalans Dragons	1
2	(Turkey) Yusuf Aydin	Hull FC	1
2	(Samoa) Sauaso Sue	Hull KR	1
2	(Australia) Jackson Hastings	St Helens	1

=== (yellow card) Yellow cards ===
Rank	Player	Club	Yellow cards
1	(England) Mikey Lewis	Hull KR	4
2	(Australia) Jackson Hastings	St Helens	3
2	(England) Jack Welsby	St Helens	3
2	(Ireland) James Bentley	Warrington Wolves	3
5	(France) Ben Garcia	Catalans Dragons	2
5	(Fiji) Taane Milne	Huddersfield Giants	2
5	(Australia) David Klemmer	St Helens	2
5	(England) Toby King	Warrington Wolves	2
5	(Australia) Adam Keighran	Wigan Warriors	2
5	(England) Brad O'Neill	Wigan Warriors	2
5	(Tonga) Ata Hingano	York Knights	2

As of 29 August 2026 (Round 25)

== Attendances ==
=== Club attendances ===
Club	Home Games	Total	Average	Highest	Lowest
Bradford Bulls	13	111,467	8,574	14,491	6,786
Castleford Tigers	13	106,481	8,191	9,455	6,105
Catalans Dragons	12	103,253	8,604	10,259	7,222
Huddersfield Giants	12	58,321	4,860	8,394	3,391
Hull F.C	13	170,550	13,119	19,809	11,843
Hull KR	12	139,778	11,648	11,325	10,246
Leeds Rhinos	14	221,594	15,828	19,698	13,452
Leigh Leopards	13	113,146	8,704	9,603	7,603
St Helens	13	147,894	11,376	17,918	9,661
Toulouse Olympique	12	58,673	5,334	7,360	3,070
Wakefield Trinity	14	121,418	8,673	9,258	7,552
Warrington Wolves	14	146,116	10,437	15,064	8,354
Wigan Warriors	14	223,907	15,993	19,049	13,187
York Knights	13	76,031	5,841	8,500	4,014

As of 26 September 2026

=== Top 10 attendances ===
Rank	Home team	Away team	Stadium	Attendance
1	Hull KR	Leeds Rhinos	Allegiant Stadium	45,719
2	Magic Weekend: Day 2		Hill Dickinson Stadium	42,903
3	Magic Weekend: Day 1		Hill Dickinson Stadium	34,539
4	Leeds Rhinos	Wigan Warriors	Headingley Stadium	19,698
5	Wigan Warriors	Catalans Dragons	Brick Community Stadium	19,049
6	Wigan Warriors	St Helens	Brick Community Stadium	18,906
7	Hull FC	Hull KR	MKM Stadium	18,809
8	Leeds Rhinos	Hull KR	Headingley Stadium	18,456
9	St Helens	Wigan Warriors	Brewdog Stadium	17,918
10	Wigan Warriors	Toulouse Olympique	Brick Community Stadium	16,889

As of 5 September 2026

(Round 26)

== End-of-season awards ==
The end of season awards took place on Tuesday 29 September. Wigan Warriors's Brad O'Neill was announced as the Man of Steel, whilst Matt Peet was named as coach of the year. St Helens's Harry Robertson was named as young player of the season, for the second successive year.

- Man of Steel: (England) Brad O'Neill
- Coach of the Year: (England) Matt Peet
- Young Player of the Year: (England) Harry Robertson
- Top tackler: (England) Joe Mellor: (1,475 tackles)
- Top try scorer: (Fiji) Maika Sivo: (29 tries)
- Top meters: (Australia) Charlie Staines (4,490 meters)
