= 2024 RFL Championship season results =

The fixture list for the 2024 RFL Championship was issued on 3 December 2023. The regular season comprised 26 rounds to be followed by the play-offs.

All times, including matches played in France, are UK local time (UTC±00:00 until 31 March 2024, UTC+01:00 thereafter).

== Regular season ==
=== Round 1 ===
Betfred Championship: round one
Home	Score	Away	Match Information
Home	Score	Away	Date and Time	Venue	Referee	Attendance
Sheffield Eagles	24–22	Toulouse Olympique	15 March 2024, 19:30	Sheffield Olympic Legacy Stadium	M. Smaill	794
Wakefield Trinity	42–12	Bradford Bulls	15 March 2024, 20:00	Belle Vue	M. Griffiths	7,221
Batley Bulldogs	20–24	Featherstone Rovers	17 March 2024, 15:00	Fox's Biscuits Stadium	S. Mikalauskas	1,961
Dewsbury Rams	10–24	Halifax Panthers	17 March 2024, 15:00	Crown Flatt	K. Moore	1,449
Doncaster	36–20	York Knights	17 March 2024, 15:00	Eco-Power Stadium	R. Cox	1,463
Widnes Vikings	44–8	Barrow Raiders	17 March 2024, 15:00	Halton Stadium	C. Worsley	1,758
Whitehaven	18–16	Swinton Lions	17 March 2024, 15:00	Recreation Ground	B. Milligan	653

=== Round 2 ===
Betfred Championship: round two
Home	Score	Away	Match Information
Home	Score	Away	Date and Time	Venue	Referee	Attendance
Widnes Vikings	28–10	Swinton Lions	29 March 2024, 15:00	Halton Stadium	M. Smaill	2,751
Whitehaven	23–22	Barrow Raiders	29 March 2024, 15:00	Recreation Ground	M. Lynn
Dewsbury Rams	24–4	Batley Bulldogs	29 March 2024, 17:00	Crown Flatt	N. Bennett	1,549
Featherstone Rovers	12–20	Wakefield Trinity	29 March 2024, 18:00	Post Office Road	L. Rush	4,127
Bradford Bulls	29–10	Halifax Panthers	29 March 2024, 19:30	Odsal Stadium	M. Griffiths	3,853
Doncaster	20–26	Sheffield Eagles	29 March 2024, 15:00	Eco-Power Stadium	S. Mikalauskas	1,710
York Knights	14–20	Toulouse Olympique	31 March 2024, 15:00	York Community Stadium	B. Thaler	2,046

=== Round 3 ===
Betfred Championship: round three
Home	Score	Away	Match Information
Home	Score	Away	Date and Time	Venue	Referee	Attendance
Toulouse Olympique	14–20	Swinton Lions	6 April 2024, 18:00	Stade Ernest-Wallon	R. Cox	3,542
Barrow Raiders	15–14	York Knights	7 April 2024, 15:00	Craven Park	K. Moore	1,692
Dewsbury Rams	6–24	Widnes Vikings	7 April 2024, 15:00	Crown Flatt	M. Lynn	1,084
Doncaster	6–42	Wakefield Trinity	7 April 2024, 15:00	Eco-Power Stadium	B. Thaler	2,520
Featherstone Rovers	14–24	Bradford Bulls	7 April 2024, 15:00	Post Office Road	S. Mikalauskas
Halifax Panthers	18–10	Batley Bulldogs	7 April 2024, 15:00	The Shay	C. Worsley	1,770
Whitehaven	16–42	Sheffield Eagles	7 April 2024, 15:00	Recreation Ground	M. Grifiths	598

=== Round 4 ===
Betfred Championship: round four
Home	Score	Away	Match Information
Home	Score	Away	Date and Time	Venue	Referee	Attendance
Bradford Bulls	19–12	Toulouse Olympique	15 April 2024, 18:00	Odsal Stadium	J. Vella	2,720
Barrow Raiders	27–20	Dewsbury Rams	14 April 2024, 15:00	Craven Park	R. Cox	1,675
Doncaster	4–46	Featherstone Rovers	14 April 2024, 15:00	Eco-Power Stadium	L. Rush	1,701
Swinton Lions	4–22	Sheffield Eagles	14 April 2024, 15:00	Heywood Road	S. Mikalauskas	786
York Knights	6–50	Wakefield Trinity	14 April 2024, 15:00	York Community Stadium (Note: Fixture switched with the round 24 match between the two clubs due to ongoing works at Wakefield's ground.)	T. Grant	2,695
Whitehaven	12–25	Batley Bulldogs	14 April 2024, 15:00	Recreation Ground	M. Smaill	450
Widnes Vikings	40–14	Halifax Panthers	14 April 2024, 15:00	Halton Stadium	B. Thaler	2,558

=== Round 5 ===
Betfred Championship: round five
Home	Score	Away	Match Information
Home	Score	Away	Date and Time	Venue	Referee	Attendance
Toulouse Olympique	40–4	Whitehaven	20 April 2024, 18:00	Stade Ernest-Wallon	K. Moore	2,055
Barrow Raiders	6–38	Doncaster	21 April 2024, 15:00	Craven Park	M. Lynn	1,616
Batley Bulldogs	14–34	Wakefield Trinity	21 April 2024, 15:00	Fox's Biscuits Stadium	C. Worsley	2,572
Featherstone Rovers	32–24	Widnes Vikings	21 April 2024, 15:00	Post Office Road	S. Mikalauskas	2,200
Halifax Panthers	0–46	Sheffield Eagles	21 April 2024, 15:00	The Shay	L. Rush	1,521
Swinton Lions	50–22	Dewsbury Rams	21 April 2024, 15:00	Heywood Road	N. Bennett	894
York Knights	25–14	Bradford Bulls	21 April 2024, 15:00	York Community Stadium	M. Smaill	2,675

=== Round 6 ===
Betfred Championship: round six
Home	Score	Away	Match Information
Home	Score	Away	Date and Time	Venue	Referee	Attendance
Wakefield Trinity	28–12	Toulouse Olympique	27 April 2024, 18:00	Belle Vue	B. Thaler	6,743
Batley Bulldogs	22–18	York Knights	28 April 2024, 15:00	Fox's Biscuits Stadium	S. Mikalauskas	845
Bradford Bulls	13–14	Widnes Vikings	28 April 2024, 15:00	Odsal Stadium	C. Worsley	3,025
Doncaster	38–12	Dewsbury Rams	28 April 2024, 15:00	Eco-Power Stadium	M. Lynn	1,296
Halifax Panthers	12–28	Swinton Lions	28 April 2024, 15:00	The Shay	M. Smaill	1,372
Sheffield Eagles	54–0	Barrow Raiders	28 April 2024, 15:00	Sheffield Olympic Legacy Stadium	K. Moore	1,103
Whitehaven	24–28	Featherstone Rovers	28 April 2024, 15:00	Recreation Ground	R. Cox	521

=== Round 7 ===
Betfred Championship: round seven
Home	Score	Away	Match Information
Home	Score	Away	Date and Time	Venue	Referee	Attendance
Sheffield Eagles	10–36	Wakefield Trinity	3 May 2024, 19:30	Sheffield Olympic Legacy Stadium	B. Thaler	1,998
Dewsbury Rams	21–38	Toulouse Olympique	4 May 2024, 18:00	Crown Flatt	B. Milligan
Barrow Raiders	24–14	Batley Bulldogs	5 May 2024, 15:00	Craven Park	K. Moore	1,976
Featherstone Rovers	36–16	Halifax Panthers	5 May 2024, 15:00	Post Office Road	M. Lynn
Swinton Lions	12–38	Bradford Bulls	5 May 2024, 15:00	Heywood Road	L. Rush	1,187
Widnes Vikings	16–14	Doncaster	5 May 2024, 15:00	Halton Stadium	R. Cox	2,936
York Knights	16–36	Whitehaven	5 May 2024, 15:00	York Community Stadium	C. Worsley	1,698

=== Round 8 ===
Betfred Championship: round eight
Home	Score	Away	Match Information
Home	Score	Away	Date and Time	Venue	Referee	Attendance
Toulouse Olympique	38–16	Barrow Raiders	18 May 2024, 15:00	Stade Ernest-Wallon	M. Lynn	2,313
Bradford Bulls	28–10	Sheffield Eagles	19 May 2024, 15:00	Odsal Stadium	J. Vella	2,234
Dewsbury Rams	12–46	Featherstone Rovers	19 May 2024, 15:00	Crown Flatt	C. Worsley	1,150
Doncaster	26–0	Batley Bulldogs	19 May 2024, 15:00	Eco-Power Stadium	M. Smaill	1,236
Wakefield Trinity	46–22	Swinton Lions	19 May 2024, 15:00	Belle Vue	R. Cox	5,268
Widnes Vikings	28–28	Whitehaven	19 May 2024, 15:00	Halton Stadium	K. Moore	2,741
York Knights	40–18	Halifax Panthers	19 May 2024, 15:00	York Community Stadium	L. Rush	1,693

=== Round 9 ===
Betfred Championship: round nine
Home	Score	Away	Match Information
Home	Score	Away	Date and Time	Venue	Referee	Attendance
Sheffield Eagles	36–13	Dewsbury Rams	24 May 2024, 19:30	Sheffield Olympic Legacy Stadium	R. Cox	971
Toulouse Olympique	28–20	Widnes Vikings	25 May 2024, 18:00	Stade Ernest-Wallon	L. Rush	2,130
Batley Bulldogs	21–20	Bradford Bulls	26 May 2024, 13:00	Fox's Biscuits Stadium	S. Mikalauskas
Barrow Raiders	25–12	Featherstone Rovers	26 May 2024, 15:00	Craven Park	M. Smaill	2,311
Halifax Panthers	34–8	Doncaster	26 May 2024, 15:00	The Shay	A. Sweet	1,479
Swinton Lions	22–30	York Knights	26 May 2024, 15:00	Heywood Road	M. Lynn	844
Whitehaven	6–30	Wakefield Trinity	26 May 2024, 15:00	Recreation Ground	K. Moore	1,572

=== Round 10 ===
Betfred Championship: round ten
Home	Score	Away	Match Information
Home	Score	Away	Date and Time	Venue	Referee	Attendance
Wakefield Trinity	56–0	Dewsbury Rams	31 May 2024, 20:00	Belle Vue	M. Lynn	5,892
Halifax Panthers	24–38	Toulouse Olympique	1 June 2024, 18:00	The Shay	J. Vella	1,347
Batley Bulldogs	31–18	Sheffield Eagles	2 June 2024, 15:00	Fox's Biscuits Stadium	C. Worsley	983
Bradford Bulls	36–24	Barrow Raiders	2 June 2024, 15:00	Odsal Stadium	M. Griffiths	2,655
Doncaster	25–25	Whitehaven	2 June 2024, 15:00	Eco-Power Stadium	R. Cox	1,740
Featherstone Rovers	40–42	Swinton Lions	2 June 2024, 15:00	Post Office Road	S. Mikalauskas	2,200
York Knights	18–22	Widnes Vikings	2 June 2024, 15:00	York Community Stadium	M. Smaill	2,163

=== Round 11 ===
Betfred Championship: round eleven
Home	Score	Away	Match Information
Home	Score	Away	Date and Time	Venue	Referee	Attendance
Barrow Raiders	28–38	Halifax Panthers	15 June 2024, 18:00	Craven Park	C. Worsley	1,994
Toulouse Olympique	52–0	Doncaster	15 June 2024, 18:00	Stade Ernest-Wallon	M. Griffiths	2,138
Dewsbury Rams	0–40	York Knights	16 June 2024, 15:00	Crown Flatt	K. Moore
Sheffield Eagles	18–16	Featherstone Rovers	16 June 2024, 15:00	Sheffield Olympic Legacy Stadium	R. Cox	1,444
Swinton Lions	16–20	Batley Bulldogs	16 June 2024, 15:00	Heywood Road	M. Smaill	917
Whitehaven	18–36	Bradford Bulls	16 June 2024, 15:00	Recreation Ground	M. Lynn
Widnes Vikings	18–20	Wakefield Trinity	16 June 2024, 15:00	Halton Stadium	S. Mikalauskas	4,056

=== Round 12 ===
Betfred Championship: round twelve
Home	Score	Away	Match Information
Home	Score	Away	Date and Time	Venue	Referee	Attendance
Batley Bulldogs	0–36	Toulouse Olympique	22 June 2024, 18:00	Fox's Biscuits Stadium	J. Vella
Bradford Bulls	38–4	Doncaster	23 June 2024, 15:00	Odsal Stadium	R. Cox	2,909
Featherstone Rovers	24–34	York Knights	23 June 2024, 15:00	Post Office Road	S. Mikalauskas	1,564
Sheffield Eagles	30–21	Widnes Vikings	23 June 2024, 15:00	Sheffield Olympic Legacy Stadium	M. Griffiths	1,003
Swinton Lions	10–24	Barrow Raiders	23 June 2024, 15:00	Heywood Road	K. Moore	945
Wakefield Trinity	46–24	Halifax Panthers	23 June 2024, 15:00	Belle Vue	M. Lynn	6,138
Whitehaven	38–12	Dewsbury Rams	23 June 2024, 15:00	Recreation Ground	C. Worsley

=== Round 13 ===
Betfred Championship: round thirteen
Home	Score	Away	Match Information
Home	Score	Away	Date and Time	Venue	Referee	Attendance
Doncaster	18–8	Swinton Lions	29 June 2024, 18:30	Eco-Power Stadium	C. Worsley	1,056
Toulouse Olympique	20–0	Featherstone Rovers	29 June 2024, 20:00 (Note: Part of a triple-header at the same stadium with the international matches between the France and England men's and women's teams to celebrate 90 years of rugby league in France.)	Stade Ernest-Wallon	R. Cox	4,907
Halifax Panthers	38–18	Whitehaven	30 June 2024, 13:00	Belle Vue (Note: Game moved to Belle Vue, Wakefield due to pitch works at the Shay.)	K. Moore	500
Barrow Raiders	0–36	Wakefield Trinity	30 June 2024, 14:00	Craven Park	M. Griffiths	2,245
Dewsbury Rams	12–38	Bradford Bulls	30 June 2024, 14:30	Crown Flatt	A. Sweet
Widnes Vikings	16–24	Batley Bulldogs	30 June 2024, 14:30	Halton Stadium	M. Lynn	2,476
York Knights	10–18	Sheffield Eagles	30 June 2024, 15:00	York Community Stadium	S. Mikalauskas	2,163

=== Round 14 ===
Betfred Championship: round fourteen
Home	Score	Away	Match Information
Home	Score	Away	Date and Time	Venue	Referee	Attendance
Sheffield Eagles	28–0	Halifax Panthers	5 July 2024, 19:30	Sheffield Olympic Legacy Stadium	C. Worsley	1,023
Toulouse Olympique	12–12	Bradford Bulls	6 July 2024, 18:00	Stade Ernest-Wallon	J. Vella	2,340
Dewsbury Rams	16–20	Doncaster	7 July 2024, 15:00	Crown Flatt	M. Lynn
Featherstone Rovers	66–0	Whitehaven	7 July 2024, 15:00	Post Office Road	K. Moore	1,605
Swinton Lions	24–12	Widnes Vikings	7 July 2024, 15:00	Heywood Road	L. Rush	1,069
Wakefield Trinity	34–12	Batley Bulldogs	7 July 2024, 15:00	Belle Vue	S. Mikalauskas	5,112
York Knights	54–12	Barrow Raiders	7 July 2024, 15:00	York Community Stadium	R. Cox

=== Round 15 ===
Betfred Championship: round fifteen
Home	Score	Away	Match Information
Home	Score	Away	Date and Time	Venue	Referee	Attendance
Whitehaven	24–34	Toulouse Olympique	13 July 2024, 15:00	Recreation Ground	N. Bennett	331
Batley Bulldogs	22–2	Barrow Raiders	14 July 2024, 15:00	Fox's Biscuits Stadium	M. Smaill
Bradford Bulls	2–14	Wakefield Trinity	14 July 2024, 15:00	Odsal Stadium	M. Griffiths	3,203
Halifax Panthers	6–14	Featherstone Rovers	14 July 2024, 15:00	The Shay	L. Rush	1,760
Sheffield Eagles	22–34	Swinton Lions	14 July 2024, 15:00	Sheffield Olympic Legacy Stadium	S. Mikalauskas	1,063
Widnes Vikings	34–12	Dewsbury Rams	14 July 2024, 15:00	Halton Stadium	K. Moore	2,337
York Knights	27–0	Doncaster	14 July 2024, 15:00	York Community Stadium	C. Worsley

=== Round 16 ===
Betfred Championship: round sixteen
Home	Score	Away	Match Information
Home	Score	Away	Date and Time	Venue	Referee	Attendance
Toulouse Olympique	32–4	Wakefield Trinity	20 July 2024, 17:00	Stade Ernest-Wallon	T. Grant	2,822
Featherstone Rovers	12–24	Doncaster	20 July 2024, 18:00	Post Office Road	M. Smaill
Barrow Raiders	8–6	Sheffield Eagles	21 July 2024, 15:00	Craven Park	B. Milligan	1,552
Batley Bulldogs	29–22	Dewsbury Rams	21 July 2024, 15:00	Fox's Biscuits Stadium	R. Cox
Bradford Bulls	36–28	York Knights	21 July 2024, 15:00	Odsal Stadium	M. Lynn	3,025
Halifax Panthers	20–24	Widnes Vikings	21 July 2024, 15:00	The Shay	J. Vella	1,409
Swinton Lions	20–22	Whitehaven	21 July 2024, 15:00	Heywood Road	C. Worsley	859

=== Round 17 ===
Betfred Championship: round seventeen
Home	Score	Away	Match Information
Home	Score	Away	Date and Time	Venue	Referee	Attendance
Toulouse Olympique	58–6	Dewsbury Rams	27 July 2024, 18:00	Stade Ernest-Wallon	G. Poumes	2,155
Batley Bulldogs	16–22	Halifax Panthers	28 July 2024, 15:00	Fox's Biscuits Stadium	M. Lynn
Doncaster	37–30	Barrow Raiders	28 July 2024, 15:00	Eco-Power Stadium	B. Milligan	1,405
Sheffield Eagles	78–24	Whitehaven	28 July 2024, 15:00	Sheffield Olympic Legacy Stadium	A. Sweet	833
Wakefield Trinity	46–18	Featherstone Rovers	28 July 2024, 15:00	Belle Vue	J. Vella	6,453
Widnes Vikings	25–6	Bradford Bulls	28 July 2024, 15:00	Halton Stadium	R. Cox	3,065
York Knights	34–4	Swinton Lions	28 July 2024, 15:00	York Community Stadium	K. Moore

=== Round 18 ===
Betfred Championship: round eighteen
Home	Score	Away	Match Information
Home	Score	Away	Date and Time	Venue	Referee	Attendance
Swinton Lions	4–48	Toulouse Olympique	3 August 2024, 18:00	Heywood Road	R. Cox	629
Barrow Raiders	24–24	Bradford Bulls	4 August 2024, 15:00	Craven Park	M. Smaill	2,419
Dewsbury Rams	16–42	Wakefield Trinity	4 August 2024, 15:00	Crown Flatt	D. Arnold	1,750
Featherstone Rovers	24–16	Batley Bulldogs	4 August 2024, 15:00	Post Office Road	C. Worsley	1,544
Halifax Panthers	38–18	York Knights	4 August 2024, 15:00	The Shay	L. Rush	1,543
Sheffield Eagles	22–20	Doncaster	4 August 2024, 15:00	Sheffield Olympic Legacy Stadium	M. Lynn	1,075
Whitehaven	12–24	Widnes Vikings	4 August 2024, 15:00	Recreation Ground	A. Sweet	855

=== Round 19 ===
Betfred Championship: round nineteen
Home	Score	Away	Match Information
Home	Score	Away	Date and Time	Venue	Referee	Attendance
Wakefield Trinity	42–6	Sheffield Eagles	9 August 2024, 20:00	Belle Vue	A. Moore	4,821
Doncaster	20–18	Toulouse Olympique	10 August 2024, 18:00	Eco-Power Stadium	M. Smaill	1,121
Batley Bulldogs	26–6	Swinton Lions	11 August 2024, 15:00	Fox's Biscuits Stadium	J. Vella
Bradford Bulls	58–0	Whitehaven	11 August 2024, 15:00	Odsal Stadium	C. Worsley	2,502
Halifax Panthers	38–12	Barrow Raiders	11 August 2024, 15:00	The Shay	R. Cox	1,421
Widnes Vikings	0–8	Featherstone Rovers	11 August 2024, 15:00	Halton Stadium	M. Lynn	2,422
York Knights	54–12	Dewsbury Rams	11 August 2024, 15:00	York Community Stadium	W. Turley

=== Round 20 ===
Betfred Championship: round twenty
Home	Score	Away	Match Information
Home	Score	Away	Date and Time	Venue	Referee	Attendance
Sheffield Eagles	14–24	Batley Bulldogs	16 August 2024, 19:30	Sheffield Olympic Legacy Stadium	J. Vella	877
Toulouse Olympique	12–20	York Knights	17 August 2024, 18:00	Stade Ernest-Wallon	K. Moore	2,181
Bradford Bulls	21–22	Featherstone Rovers	18 August 2024, 15:00	Odsal Stadium	C. Worsley	3,099
Dewsbury Rams	24–31	Barrow Raiders	18 August 2024, 15:00	Crown Flatt	A. Sweet
Swinton Lions	20–6	Halifax Panthers	18 August 2024, 15:00	Heywood Road	S. Mikalauskas	1,037
Wakefield Trinity	36–12	Widnes Vikings	18 August 2024, 15:00	Belle Vue	M. Griffiths	5,036
Whitehaven	28–24	Doncaster	18 August 2024, 15:00	Recreation Ground	B. Milligan	699

=== Round 21 ===
Betfred Championship: round twenty one
Home	Score	Away	Match Information
Home	Score	Away	Date and Time	Venue	Referee	Attendance
Featherstone Rovers	22–10	Toulouse Olympique	24 August 2024, 18:00	Post Office Road	J. Vella
Barrow Raiders	20–18	Swinton Lions	25 August 2024, 15:00	Craven Park	K. Moore	1,495
Dewsbury Rams	10–18	Whitehaven	25 August 2024, 15:00	Crown Flatt	W. Turley
Doncaster	4–18	Bradford Bulls	25 August 2024, 15:00	Eco-Power Stadium	M. Lynn	1,758
Halifax Panthers	6–48	Wakefield Trinity	25 August 2024, 15:00	The Shay	L. Rush
Widnes Vikings	35–20	Sheffield Eagles	25 August 2024, 15:00	Halton Stadium	S. Mikalauskas	2,486
York Knights	37–6	Batley Bulldogs	25 August 2024, 15:00	York Community Stadium	R. Cox

=== Round 22 ===
Betfred Championship: round twenty two
Home	Score	Away	Match Information
Home	Score	Away	Date and Time	Venue	Referee	Attendance
Bradford Bulls	54–0	Dewsbury Rams	30 August 2024, 19:30	Odsal Stadium	R. Cox	3,006
Toulouse Olympique	32–12	Sheffield Eagles	31 August 2024, 18:00	Stade Ernest-Wallon	M. Lynn	2,079
Batley Bulldogs	8–12	Widnes Vikings	1 September 2024, 15:00	Fox's Biscuits Stadium	C. Worsley
Doncaster	16–17	Halifax Panthers	1 September 2024, 15:00	Eco-Power Stadium	J. Vella	1,443
Featherstone Rovers	36–18	Barrow Raiders	1 September 2024, 15:00	Post Office Road	S. Mikalauskas	1,345
Swinton Lions	0–60	Wakefield Trinity	1 September 2024, 15:00	Heywood Road	M. Smaill	1,048
Whitehaven	0–40	York Knights	1 September 2024, 15:00	Recreation Ground	K. Moore

=== Round 23 ===
Betfred Championship: round twenty three
Home	Score	Away	Match Information
Home	Score	Away	Date and Time	Venue	Referee	Attendance
Barrow Raiders	24–36	Toulouse Olympique	7 September 2024, 15:00	Craven Park	M. Lynn	1,709
Batley Bulldogs	0–38	Doncaster	8 September 2024, 15:00	Fox's Biscuits Stadium	K. Moore
Halifax Panthers	34–6	Dewsbury Rams	8 September 2024, 15:00	The Shay	B. Thaler	1,647
Sheffield Eagles	12–30	Bradford Bulls	8 September 2024, 15:00	Sheffield Olympic Legacy Stadium	C. Worsley	1,948
Swinton Lions	28–8	Featherstone Rovers	8 September 2024, 15:00	Heywood Road	S. Mikalauskas	780
Wakefield Trinity	60–6	Whitehaven	8 September 2024, 15:00	Belle Vue	R. Cox	5,096
Widnes Vikings	6–12	York Knights	8 September 2024, 15:00	Halton Stadium	L. Rush	2,663

=== Round 24 ===
Betfred Championship: round twenty four
Home	Score	Away	Match Information
Home	Score	Away	Date and Time	Venue	Referee	Attendance
Toulouse Olympique	38–18	Halifax Panthers	14 September 2024, 18:00	Stade Ernest-Wallon	A. Belafonte	2,985
Barrow Raiders	34–14	Whitehaven	15 September 2024, 15:00	Craven Park	S. Mikalauskas	2,301
Bradford Bulls	16–14	Batley Bulldogs	15 September 2024, 15:00	Odsal Stadium	R. Cox	3,212
Dewsbury Rams	16–28	Swinton Lions	15 September 2024, 15:00	Crown Flatt	B. Thaler
Doncaster	30–14	Widnes Vikings	15 September 2024, 15:00	Eco-Power Stadium	M. Smaill	1,360
Featherstone Rovers	6–20	Sheffield Eagles	15 September 2024, 15:00	Post Office Road	C. Worsley	1,246
Wakefield Trinity	20–4	York City Knights	15 September 2024, 15:00	Belle Vue (Note: Fixture switched with the round 4 match between the two clubs.)	J. Vella	5,137

=== Round 25 ===
Betfred Championship: round twenty five
Home	Score	Away	Match Information
Home	Score	Away	Date and Time	Venue	Referee	Attendance
Sheffield Eagles	24–26	York Knights	20 September 2024, 19:30	Sheffield Olympic Legacy Stadium	L. Rush	952
Featherstone Rovers	50–12	Dewsbury Rams	21 September 2024, 18:00	Post Office Road	M. Smaill
Widnes Vikings	12–18	Toulouse Olympique	21 September 2024, 18:00	Halton Stadium	K. Moore	3,011
Wakefield Trinity	46–0	Barrow Raiders	21 September 2024, 18:00	Belle Vue	W. Turley	5,011
Batley Bulldogs	28–14	Whitehaven	22 September 2024, 15:00	Fox's Biscuits Stadium	C. Worsley	1,644
Halifax Panthers	14–10	Bradford Bulls	22 September 2024, 15:00	The Shay	M. Lynn	3,285
Swinton Lions	20–22	Doncaster	22 September 2024, 15:00	Heywood Road	S. Mikalauskas	836

=== Round 26 ===
Betfred Championship: round twenty six
Home	Score	Away	Match Information
Home	Score	Away	Date and Time	Venue	Referee	Attendance
Toulouse Olympique	64–16	Batley Bulldogs	28 September 2024, 18:00	Stade Ernest-Wallon	G. Poumes	3,361
Barrow Raiders	24–26	Widnes Vikings	29 September 2024, 15:00	Craven Park	L. Rush	2,953
Bradford Bulls	50–0	Swinton Lions	29 September 2024, 15:00	Odsal Stadium	M. Smaill
Dewsbury Rams	28–8	Sheffield Eagles	29 September 2024, 15:00	Crown Flatt	K. Moore
Wakefield Trinity	72–6	Doncaster	29 September 2024, 15:00	Belle Vue	B. Thaler	5,233
Whitehaven	23–20	Halifax Panthers	29 September 2024, 15:00	Recreation Ground	J. Vella	876
York Knights	16–6	Featherstone Rovers	29 September 2024, 15:00	York Community Stadium	A. Moore	2,450

== Play-offs ==
The format follows previous years with the teams finishing third to sixth in the regular season meeting in the eliminators with the winners of those two matches progressing to the semi-finals. The teams that finish first and second in the regular season have byes to the semi-finals and also have home advantage. Wakefield Trinity, having finished first, play whichever team is the lowest ranked winner of the eliminators while the other semi-final sees, the second placed team playing the highest ranked winner of the eliminators.

=== Team bracket ===
Eliminators
4	York Knights	27
5	Widnes Vikings	10
3	Bradford Bulls	25
6	Featherstone Rovers	12

Semi-finals
1	Wakefield Trinity	22
4	York Knights	13
2	Toulouse Olympique	21
3	Bradford Bulls	20

Grand Final
1	Wakefield Trinity	36
2	Toulouse Olympique	0

=== Week 1: Eliminators ===
5 October 2024
15:00

York Knights	27–10	Widnes Vikings
Tries: Williams, Law, Lineham (2), Dee; Goals: Williams (3/5); Drop goals: Harris		Tries: Lloyd; Goals: Gilmore (3/3)

York Community Stadium
Attendance: 2,010
Referee: J. Vella

6 October 2024
15:00

Bradford Bulls	25–12	Featherstone Rovers
Tries: Myers, Gill, Lilley, Appo; Goals: Lilley (4/5); Drop goals: Lilley		Tries: Hardcastle, Day; Goals: Reynolds (2/2)

Odsal Stadium
Referee: A. Moore

=== Week 2: Semi-finals ===
13 October 2024
15:00

Wakefield Trinity	22–13	York Knights
Tries: Jowitt, Gale, Olpherts, Thornley; Goals: Jowitt (3/4)		Tries: Field, Hingano; Goals: Dagger (2/2); Drop goals: Harris

Belle Vue
Attendance: 5,946
Referee: A. Moore

13 October 2024
17:00

Toulouse Olympique	21–20	Bradford Bulls
Tries: Laguerre, Ulberg, Armitage, Marion; Goals: Shorrocks (2/4); Drop goals: Pelissier		Tries: Lilley, Pele, Appo; Goals: Lilley (4/4)

Stade Ernest Wallon
Attendance: 2,680
Referee: T. Grant

=== Week 3: Championship Grand Final ===
19 October 2024
19:00

Wakefield Trinity	36–0	Toulouse Olympique
Tries: Olpherts (2), Ashurst, McGillvary (2), Thornley, Pratt; Goals: Jowitt (3/6), McGillvary (1/1)

Belle Vue
Attendance: 8,016
Referee: A. Moore

Team details
Wakefield Trinity		Position	Toulouse Olympique
Name	Number	Position	Number	Name
Max Jowitt	1	FB	1	Olly Ashall-Bott
Jermaine McGillvary	2	WG	2	Paul Ulberg
Iain Thornley	3	CE	3	Guy Armitage
Oli Pratt	4	CE	4	Paul Marcon
Derrell Olpherts	5	WG	5	Benjamin Laguerre
Luke Gale	6	SO	6	Ryan Rivett
Mason Lino	7	SH	7	Jake Shorrocks
Josh Bowden	8	PR	8	Lambert Belmas
Liam Hood	9	HK	9	Calum Gahan
Renouf Atoni	10	PF	10	Harrison Hansen
Matty Ashurst	11	SR	11	Maxime Stefani
Isaiah Vagana	12	SR	12	Dominique Peyroux
Jay Pitts	13	LF	13	Anthony Marion
Lachlan Walmsley	14	IN	14	Reubenn Rennie
Caleb Uele	15	IN	15	Éloi Pélissier
Ky Rodwell	16	IN	16	James Roumanos
Thomas Doyle	17	IN	17	Dimitri Biscarro
Mattieu Cozza	18	CS	18	Greg Richards
Daryl Powell		Coach		Sylvain Houles

== Championship promotion play-off ==
On 13 October the team finishing 12th in the regular season will play the League One play-off final winners to decide the 13th team in the 2025 Championship. The losing team will play in League One in 2025.

Championship play-off

13 October 2024
19:30

Swinton Lions	20–22	Hunslet
Tries: Williams, Cox, Wood, Vaughan; Goals: Abram (2/4)		Tries: Turner, Berry, Flanagan, Render; Goals: Beharrell (3/4)

Heywood Road
Attendance: 885
Referee: J. Vella
