= Will Tate =

English rugby league footballer (born 2001)

Personal information
- Full name: William Tate
- Born: 20 December 2001 (age 24) Scunthorpe, North Lincolnshire, England
- Height: 5 ft 11 in (1.80 m)
- Weight: 14 st 2 lb (90 kg)

Playing information
- Position: Centre, Wing, Fullback
Club
| Years | Team | Pld | T | G | FG | P |
|---|---|---|---|---|---|---|
| 2020–23 | Hull Kingston Rovers | 16 | 4 | 0 | 0 | 16 |
| 2021(loan) | → Rochdale Hornets | 2 | 2 | 0 | 0 | 8 |
| 2022(DR) | → Dewsbury Rams | 1 | 0 | 0 | 0 | 0 |
| 2022(loan) | → Workington Town | 7 | 2 | 0 | 0 | 8 |
| 2023–25 | Castleford Tigers | 15 | 8 | 0 | 0 | 32 |
| 2026 | Wakefield Trinity | 10 | 7 | 0 | 0 | 28 |
| 2027– | Huddersfield Giants | 0 | 0 | 0 | 0 | 0 |
| | Total | 51 | 23 | 0 | 0 | 92 |
- Source: As of 21 September 2026

Will Tate (20 December 2001) is an English professional rugby league footballer who plays as a centre, winger or fullback for the Huddersfield Giants in the Super League.

He has previously played for Hull Kingston Rovers and Castleford Tigers in the Super League. He has spent time on loan or dual registration from Hull KR at the Rochdale Hornets in League 1, and at the Dewsbury Rams and Workington Town in the Championship.

== Background ==
Tate was born in Scunthorpe, North Lincolnshire, England.

Tate played for Scunthorpe Rugby Club, Cottingham Tigers ARLFC and Skirlaugh A.R.L.F.C. at youth level before signing for the City of Hull Academy in 2017. He was selected twice to play for England Youth (U16) against Wales, playing fullback in 2017 and centre in 2018.

== Career ==
=== Hull Kingston Rovers ===
On 24 September 2020, Tate made his Super League debut in round 13 of the 2020 season for Hull Kingston Rovers against the Leeds Rhinos. In the following round, Tate scored his first Super League try in Hull KR's 22–32 loss to the Huddersfield Giants. He made 4 appearances in total in 2020, and was named in the 2020 Super League Debutants Dream Team.

In 2021, Tate made 3 appearances for Hull KR towards the end of the Super League season. This included the 19-0 elimination final victory against the Warrington Wolves, and the 10-28 semi-final loss away at the Catalans Dragons.

In June 2022, Tate signed a two-year contract extension with Hull KR. Tate scored 3 tries in 9 appearances for Hull KR in the 2022 Super League season. He scored the opening try in the victory over rivals Hull F.C. in the final game of the season.

==== Rochdale Hornets (loan) ====
Tate made 2 appearances for the Rochdale Hornets in League 1 on loan from Hull KR in 2021, scoring 2 tries against Keighley Cougars.

==== Dewsbury Rams (dual registration) ====
Tate made 1 appearance for the Dewsbury Rams in the Championship in 2022, through their dual registration arrangement with Hull KR.

==== Workington Town (loan) ====
In April 2022, it was announced that Tate had joined Workington Town in the Championship on loan from Hull KR. From April to June, he made 7 appearances and scored 2 tries.

=== Castleford Tigers ===
On 9 April 2023, the Castleford Tigers announced the signing of Tate on a two-and-a-half-year deal with immediate effect. Tate joined the Tigers to take the opportunity of more first-team game time and said, "You can expect 100% effort every week. All players make errors but I always back my work rate over anyone else." He made his Castleford debut on 21 April against his previous club, Hull KR. Tate scored his first Castleford try in his second appearance, against Hull F.C. in the sixth round of the Challenge Cup. He made seven appearances and scored three tries in total before suffering an ankle fracture against St Helens in August.

Tate spent the majority of the 2024 season recovering from his ankle injury, before making his return against Huddersfield at the Magic Weekend after 12 months on the sidelines. He made three starts at centre but suffered a rolled ankle against Hull in round 24, ruling him out for the remaining three matches of the campaign.

Will Tate picked up an ankle injury just before the start of the 2025 season which limited his opportunity to play. He came back strongly in August and scored 5 tries in 5 games including a hat trick away at St Helens in the last game of the season.

=== Wakefield Trinity ===
On 22 October 2025 it was reported that he had signed for Wakefield Trinity in the Super League on a 1-year deal

=== Huddersfield Giants ===
On 21 September 2026 it was reported that he had signed for Huddersfield Giants in the Super League on a 2-year deal.

== Statistics ==
Appearances and points in all competitions by year
| Club | Season | Tier | App | T | G | DG | Pts |
|---|---|---|---|---|---|---|---|
| Hull Kingston Rovers | 2020 | Super League | 4 | 1 | 0 | 0 | 4 |
| Hull Kingston Rovers | 2021 | Super League | 3 | 0 | 0 | 0 | 0 |
| Hull Kingston Rovers | 2022 | Super League | 9 | 3 | 0 | 0 | 12 |
| Hull Kingston Rovers | Total | | 16 | 4 | 0 | 0 | 16 |
| → Rochdale Hornets (loan) | 2021 | League 1 | 2 | 2 | 0 | 0 | 8 |
| → Dewsbury Rams (DR) | 2022 | Championship | 1 | 0 | 0 | 0 | 0 |
| → Workington Town (loan) | 2022 | Championship | 7 | 2 | 0 | 0 | 8 |
| Castleford Tigers | 2023 | Super League | 7 | 3 | 0 | 0 | 12 |
| Castleford Tigers | 2024 | Super League | 3 | 0 | 0 | 0 | 0 |
| Castleford Tigers | 2025 | Super League | 5 | 5 | 0 | 0 | 20 |
| Castleford Tigers | Total | | 15 | 8 | 0 | 0 | 32 |
| Wakefield Trinity | 2026 | Super League | 10 | 7 | 0 | 0 | 28 |
| Wakefield Trinity | Total | | 10 | 7 | 0 | 0 | 28 |
| Huddersfield Giants | 2027 | Super League | 0 | 0 | 0 | 0 | 0 |
| Huddersfield Giants | Total | | 0 | 0 | 0 | 0 | 0 |
| Career total | | | 51 | 23 | 0 | 0 | 92 |

As of match played 19 September 2026
