= Emre Guler =

Turkey international rugby league player (born 1998)

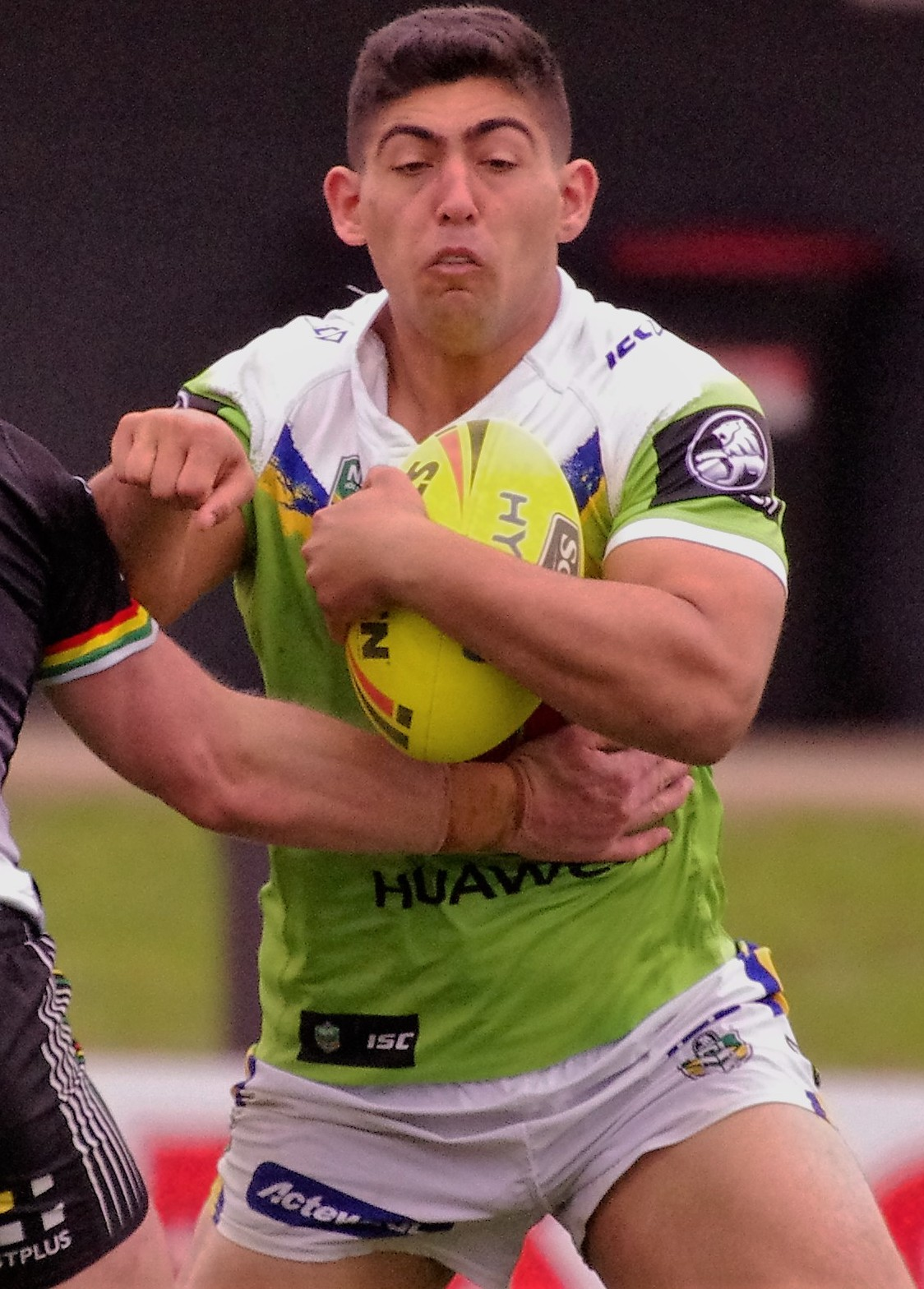

Personal information
- Full name: Emre Güler
- Born: 19 January 1998 (age 28) Sydney, New South Wales, Australia
- Height: 191 cm (6 ft 3 in)
- Weight: 112 kg (17 st 9 lb)

Playing information
- Position: Prop
Club
Years	Team	Pld	T	G	FG	P
2018–24	Canberra Raiders	93	6	0	0	24
2025–26	St George Illawarra	33	3	0	0	12
2026–	Wakefield Trinity	4	0	0	0	0
	Total	130	9	0	0	36
Representative
Years	Team	Pld	T	G	FG	P
2018	Turkey	4	0	0	0	0
2023	Prime Minister's XIII	1	0	0	0	0
- Source: As of 22 November 2026

Emre Guler (Turkish: Emre Güler; born 19 January 1998) is a Turkey international rugby league footballer who plays as a prop for the Wakefield Trinity in the Super League.

On 4 June 2026, it was announced that Guler had signed a three-year contract with Super League club Wakefield Trinity, effective from the 2027 season. Guler will join Wakefield's current squad, which includes Tray Lolesio, Caleb Hamlin-Uele, Ky Rodwell, Caius Fa'atili and Captain Mike McMeeken.

== Background ==
Guler was born in Sydney, New South Wales, Australia, and is of Turkish descent.

He played his junior rugby league for the Mascot Jets.

== Playing career ==
=== 2017 ===
In 2017, Guler represented the NSW Under 20s and the Junior Kangaroos.

=== 2018 ===
In round 23 of the 2018 NRL season, Guler made his first grade debut for Canberra against the Sydney Roosters at Canberra Stadium.

=== 2019 ===
Guler made 11 appearances for Canberra in the 2019 NRL season as the club reached the grand final for the first time in 25 years. Guler played from the bench in the club's 2019 NRL Grand Final defeat against the Sydney Roosters at Stadium Australia.

On 7 October 2019, Guler was named on the bench for the U23 Junior Australian side.

=== 2020 ===
Guler scored his first try in the top grade in round 1 of the 2020 NRL season as Canberra defeated the Gold Coast 24-6.

Guler was limited to only eight appearances for Canberra in the 2020 NRL season. He played no part in the club's finals campaign as they reached the preliminary final but were defeated by Melbourne.

=== 2021 ===
Guler played 19 games for Canberra in the 2021 NRL season as the club finished 10th on the table.

=== 2022 ===
Guler played a total of 16 games for Canberra in the 2022 NRL season as the club finished 8th on the table and qualified for the finals. Guler played in both finals matches as Canberra were eliminated in the second week by Parramatta.

=== 2023 ===
Guler played a total of 25 matches for Canberra in the 2023 NRL season as the club finished 8th on the table and qualified for the finals. Guler played in Canberra's golden point extra-time elimination final loss to Newcastle.

=== 2024 ===
Guler was limited to only eleven matches with Canberra in the 2024 NRL season as the club finished 9th on the table.

=== 2025 ===
On 27 January, it was announced that Guler had signed a two-year deal with the St. George Illawarra Dragons. Guler played 17 games for St. George Illawarra in the 2025 NRL season as the club finished 15th on the table.

=== 2026 ===
On 4 June 2026 it was announced that Guler has signed a three-year deal with Wakefield Trinity in the Betfred Super League departing St. George Illawarra at the end of the season. On 19 August, St. George announced that they had released Guler from the reminder of his contract to take up his contract with Wakefield early. On 19 August 2026 it was reported that he would join Wakefield Trinity in the Super League immediately following his release from St. George Illawarra.

== Statistics ==
Season	Team	Games	Tries	Pts
2018	Canberra Raiders	3		
2019	Canberra Raiders	11		
2020	Canberra Raiders	8	1	4
2021	Canberra Raiders	19	4	16
2022	Canberra Raiders	16		
2023	Canberra Raiders	25	1	4
2024	Canberra Raiders	11		
2025	St. George Illawarra Dragons	17	2	8
2026	St. George Illawarra Dragons	16	1	4
2026	Wakefield Trinity			
	Totals	126	9	36

*denotes still competing
