= Sinfield =

Sinfield is a surname. Notable people with the surname include:

- Alan Sinfield (1941–2017), British academic
- Ian Sinfield (athlete) (1934–2010), Australian runner
- Ian Sinfield (born 1977), Scottish rugby player
- Kevin Sinfield (born 1980), English rugby player
- Melissa Sinfield (born 1977), Australian basketball player
- Peter Sinfield (1943–2024), English songwriter
- Reg Sinfield (1900–1988), English cricketer
