= 2026 Super League Grand Final =

Rugby league championship match

2026 Betfred Super League Grand Final
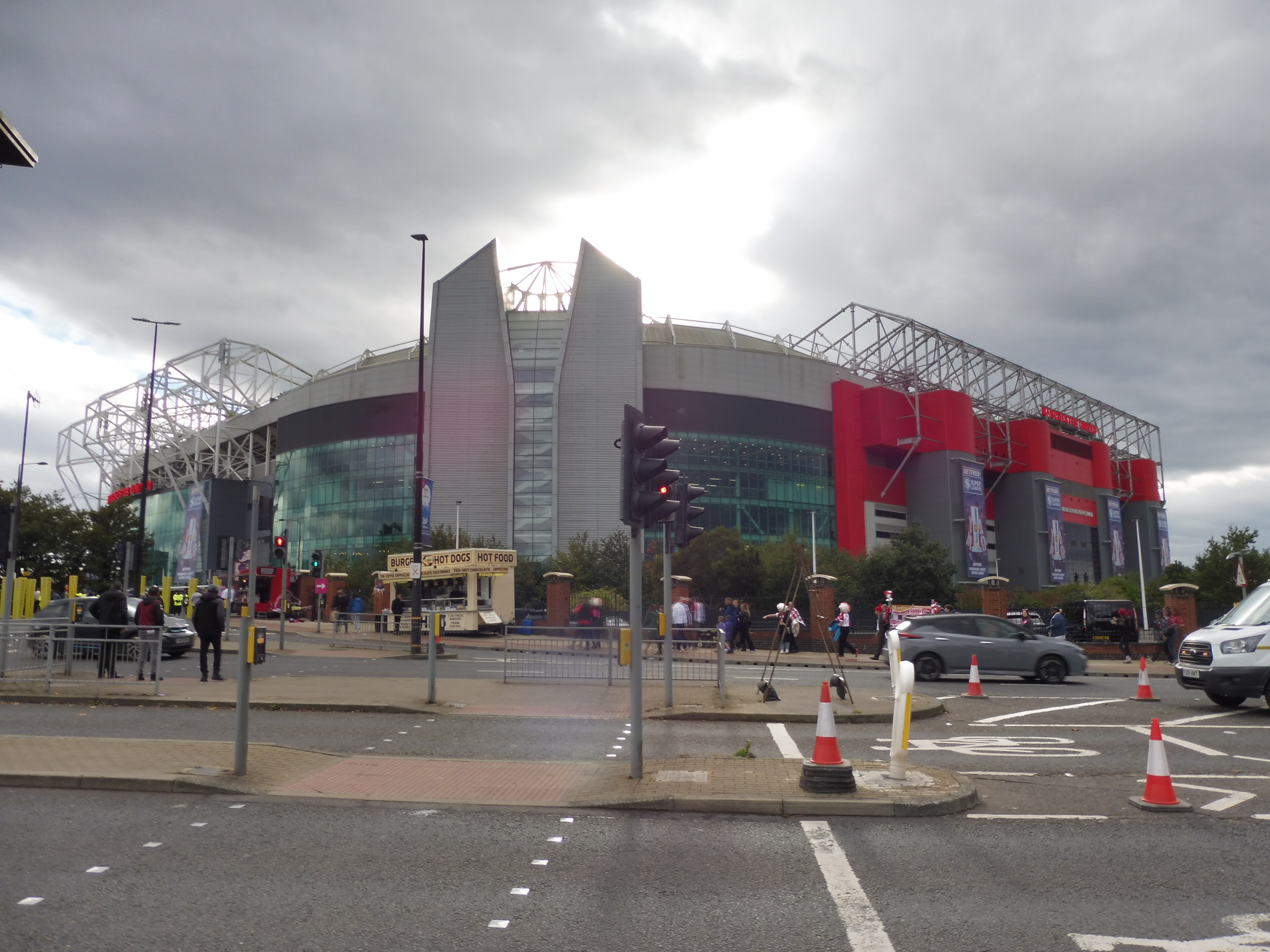
- The match took place at Old Trafford
Warrington Wolves	Wakefield Trinity
10	23
	1	2	Total
WAR	0	10	10
WAK	19	4	23
- Date: 3 October 2026
- Stadium: Old Trafford
- Location: Manchester, England
- Rob Burrow Award: Tom Johnstone
- Jerusalem: Laura Wright
- Referee: Liam Moore
- Attendance: 71,728

Broadcast partners
- Broadcasters: (United Kingdom) Sky Sports (live) (United Kingdom) BBC iPlayer (highlights) (Australia) Fox League SuperLeague+

The 2026 Super League Grand Final, named the 2026 Betfred Super League Grand Final for sponsorship reasons, was the 29th official Super League Grand Final and the championship-deciding rugby league game of the 2026 Super League season. The match was contested between Warrington Wolves and Wakefield Trinity at Old Trafford in Manchester, England, with Wakefield winning 23–10 to claim their first ever Super League title.

Neither team had won a Grand Final in the Super League era. Warrington were making their fifth appearance at a Grand Final, their first since 2018, in an attempt to win their first league title since 1955, while Wakefield were making their first Grand Final appearance, having last won a league title in 1968. It was the first Grand Final not to feature at least one of Leeds Rhinos, St Helens or Wigan Warriors.

== Background ==
The 2026 Super League season (known as the 2026 Betfred Super League season due to sponsorship by Betfred) was the 31st season of rugby league football since the Super League format was introduced in 1996. Fourteen teams competed for the League Leaders' Shield over 27 rounds, after which the highest finishing teams would enter the play-offs to compete for a place in the Grand Final and a chance to win the championship and the Super League Trophy.

Pos	Team	Pld	W	D	L	PF	PA	PD	Points
3	Warrington Wolves	27	20	0	7	726	465	+261	40
4	Wakefield Trinity	27	19	0	8	709	486	+223	38

=== Route to the final ===
==== Warrington Wolves ====
Round	Opposition	Score
Eliminators	Hull KR (H)	35–12
Semi-finals	Leeds Rhinos (A)	14–12
Key: (H) = Home venue; (A) = Away venue; (N) = Neutral venue.

Warrington Wolves finished the regular season in third place, qualifying them for the Elimination round to play sixth-placed Eliminators qualifier Hull KR at home. After defeating Hull KR 35–12, Warrington defeated the Leeds Rhinos 14–12 away in the semi-finals, qualifying them for their first Grand Final since 2018.

==== Wakefield Trinity ====
Round	Opposition	Score
Eliminators	Leigh Leopards (H)	26–16
Semi-finals	Wigan Warriors (A)	33–6
Key: (H) = Home venue; (A) = Away venue; (N) = Neutral venue.

Wakefield Trinity finished the regular season in fourth place, qualifying them for the Elimination round to play fifth-placed Eliminators qualifier Leigh Leopards at home. After defeating Leigh 26–16, Wakefield won against the 2026 league leaders and 2026 Challenge Cup final winners Wigan Warriors 33–6 away in the semi-finals in a major upset, qualifying them for their first Grand Final.

== Broadcasting ==
In the United Kingdom, both regular providers Sky Sports, via their Main Event channel, and the SuperLeague+ streaming platform aired the Grand Final, with highlights of the Grand Final also streamable on BBC iPlayer. Live radio coverage of the final was also provided by BBC Radio 5 Live.

Sky Sports' coverage was shared with Fox League in Australia and Fox Sports in the US, Pacific Media Network in New Zealand, NBCTV in Papua New Guinea, Premier Sports Asia in South East Asia, Dubai TV, Sportsnet in Canada, FloSports in the Caribbean, Sportdigital in Austria, Germany and Switzerland, and Sport Media Group in Estonia, Lithuania, Latvia, Moldova and Ukraine.

== Entertainment ==
Pre-match and half-time entertainment was provided by Soul Symphony, with the Grand Final anthem 'Jerusalem' sung by Laura Wright. Kevin Sinfield appeared to complete his final '7 in 7' ultramarathon challenge in honour of friend and teammate Rob Burrow, and then presented the Grand Final trophy.

== Match details ==
3 October 2026
18:00 BST (UTC+01:00)

Warrington Wolves	10–23	Wakefield Trinity
Tries: Arron Lindop 46', 72'; Goals: Irwin 47'	1st: 0–19; 2nd: 10–4; Report and Statistics	Tries: Scott 11'; Vagana 25'; Tevaga 35'; Johnstone 59'; Goals: Jowitt 12', 26', 36'; Drop goals: Sinfield 38'; Sin bin: Corey Hall (yellow card) 43' to 53'

Old Trafford, Manchester
Attendance: 71,728
Referee: Liam Moore
Rob Burrow Award: Tom Johnstone

Warrington Wolves		Position	Wakefield Trinity	
2	Josh Thewlis	Fullback	1	Max Jowitt
4	Albert Hopoate	Wing	5	Tom Johnstone
23	Arron Lindop	Centre	4	Corey Hall (yellow card) 42' to 52'
3	Toby King	Centre	3	Cameron Scott
5	Matty Ashton	Wing	19	Lachlan Walmsley
6	George Williams	Scrum-half	6	Jake Trueman
18	Ewan Irwin	Stand-off	20	Jack Sinfield (substituted off) 60'
16	Liam Byrne (substituted off) 18'	Prop	8	Mike McMeeken
9	Danny Walker (substituted off) 59' (substituted on) 75'	Hooker	9	Tyson Smoothy
10	James Harrison (substituted off) 23' (substituted on) 54'	Prop	10	Ky Rodwell (substituted off) 20' (substituted on) 59'
12	Sam Stone (substituted off) 62'	Second-row	26	Zac Lipowicz (substituted off) 26'
20	James Bentley (substituted off) 27' (substituted on) 62'	Second-row	18	Isaiah Vagana (substituted off) 70'
13	Ben Currie (substituted off) 69'	Loose forward	13	Jazz Tevaga (substituted off) 7' (substituted on) 23' (substituted off) 51' (substituted on) 66'
8	Luke Yates (substituted on) 18' (substituted off) 75'	Interchange	7	Mason Lino (substituted on) 60'
14	Sam Powell (substituted on) 59'	Interchange	14	Jay Pitts (substituted on) 7' (substituted off) 23' (substituted on) 51'
22	Joe Philbin (substituted on) 23' (substituted off) 54' (substituted on) 69'	Interchange	15	Caleb Hamlin-Uele (substituted on) 20' (substituted off) 66'
34	Kelepi Tanginoa (substituted on) 27'	Interchange	16	Caius Faatili (substituted on) 20' (substituted off) 59' (substituted on) 70'
18	Leon Hayes	Concussion substitute	18	Harvey Smith
	(England) Sam Burgess	Head coach		(England) Daryl Powell

== Match report ==
Rob Burrow Award winner Tom Johnstone, photographed in 2015

The officiating lineup remained unchanged from 2025 with the exception of one touch judge. Liam Moore refereed the match and was aided by touch judges Marcus Griffiths and Matty Lynn. The video referee was Jack Smith, while the reserve referee was Chris Kendall. Warrington's squad remained unchanged from their semi-final victory against Leeds with the sole exception of Jordan Crowther replacing Max Wood. The Wakefield Trinity squad also remained unchanged following their semi-final match against Wigan.

Wakefield dominated the first half and thought they had taken the lead after 6 minutes when wing Tom Johnstone crossed the try line in the corner; however a video replay showed he had been forced into touch. However, Wakefield only had to wait another until the 11th minute before Cameron Scott took Lachlan Walmsley's reverse pass to score a converted try. Further tries followed when Isaiah Vagana took Johnstone's excellent pass in the 25th minute, and 10 minutes later Wakefield added to their score through Jazz Tevaga's close range try. Max Jowitt converted all three tries to give Wakefield an 18-point lead, which was stretched by a further point before half-time courtesy of Jack Sinfield's late drop goal. This meant that Wakefield had scored 52 points without reply in the tournament, after scoring 33 points against Wigan.

After three minutes of the second half, Warrington were given hope when Corey Hall was sent to the sin-bin for a high tackle on Arron Lindop. They took advantage shortly afterwards when it was Lindop himself who scored a try after a clever dummy from Ewan Irwin, with Irwin converting to reduce the arrears to 13 points. However, Warrington then had another try by Matty Ashton ruled out for a forward pass, and could not take any further advantage of their numerical supremacy. After Hall returned to even the sides up, it was Johnstone who crossed the line in the 59th minute to make the score 23–6. Warrington did not give up, and Lindop crossed again in the 72nd minute for an unconverted try, but Wakefield were too far ahead and completed their first Super League win. Johnstone won the Rob Burrow Award for his man-of-the-match performance.
