= Seth Nikotemo =

New Zealand rugby league footballer

Personal information
- Full name: Seth Nikotemo
- Born: 29 March 2004 (age 22) Wellington, New Zealand
- Height: 6 ft 0 in (1.84 m)
- Weight: 15 st 10 lb (100 kg)

Playing information
- Position: Second-row
Club
Years	Team	Pld	T	G	FG	P
2025–26	Wakefield Trinity	29	8	0	0	28
- Source: As of 14 November 2026

Seth Nikotemo (born 29 March 2004) is a New Zealand professional rugby league footballer who last played as a second-row forward for Wakefield Trinity in the Super League.

== Background ==
Nikotemo was born in Wellington, New Zealand.

He attended Keebra Park State High School in Queensland, Australia.

Nikotemo played his junior rugby league for the Burleigh Bears. He was also selected in a number of Queensland youth sides as a junior.

== Career ==
Nikotemo was signed by the Gold Coast Titans on a three-year contract starting in 2023. He spent two seasons on the club's development roster before moving on.

He played for the Ipswich Jets in the Queensland Cup competition during the 2024 season.

In September 2024, Nikotemo signed a three-year contract with English club Wakefield Trinity.

Nikotemo suffered a thumb injury during a pre-season game, which ruled him out for the beginning of the 2025 Super League season. He made his debut for Trinity against St Helens in April 2025.

On 14 August 2026 it was reported that Wakefield Trinity had agreed to release him with immediate effect on compassionate grounds.
