= Ellis Lingard =

English rugby league footballer

Personal information
- Full name: Ellis Lingard
- Born: 22 October 2006 (age 19)

Playing information
- Position: Prop, Second-row, Loose forward
Club
Years	Team	Pld	T	G	FG	P
2025–	Wakefield Trinity	2	2	0	0	8
2025	→ Batley Bulldogs (loan)	3	0	0	0	0
2026–	→ Dewsbury Rams (loan)	7	1	0	0	0
	Total	12	3	0	0	8
- As of 1 October 2026

Ellis Lingard (born 22 October 2006) is an English professional rugby league footballer who plays as a prop, second-row and loose forward for the Dewsbury Rams in the RFL Championship, on a one-week loan from Wakefield Trinity in the Super League.

== Career ==
=== Wakefield Trinity ===
Lingard made his debut in round 12 of the 2025 Super League season for Trinity against the Salford Red Devils, scoring two tries.

=== Dewsbury Rams (loan) ===
On 18 March 2026 it was reported that he had signed for Dewsbury Rams in the RFL Championship on one-week loan

On 19 June 2026 it was reported that he had re-joined Dewsbury Rams for a second one-week loan period
