= Ian Sinfield =

Scotland international rugby league footballer

Personal information
- Full name: Ian Sinfield
- Born: 7 April 1977 (age 48) Oldham, Greater Manchester, England

Playing information
Club
Years	Team	Pld	T	G	FG	P
1998–01	Oldham	69	3	0	0	12
2002	Rochdale Hornets	14	1	0	0	4
2003	Keighley Cougars	32	5	0	0	20
2004–06	Swinton Lions	76	13	0	0	52
2007	Oldham	24	2	0	0	8
2009	Rochdale Hornets	51	13	0	0	52
2010	Swinton Lions	1	0	0	0	0
	Total	267	37	0	0	148
Representative
Years	Team	Pld	T	G	FG	P
2004–06	Scotland	3	0	0	0	0
- Relatives: Kevin Sinfield (brother); Jack Sinfield (nephew)

Ian Sinfield (born 7 April 1977) is a former professional rugby league footballer who played in the 2000s. He played at international level for Scotland, and at club level for Oldham (two spells), Rochdale Hornets (two spells), Keighley and Swinton Lions.

== International honours ==
Ian Sinfield won three caps in 2004–06 for Scotland while at Swinton.

== Personal life ==
Ian Sinfield is the older brother of the rugby league footballer, Kevin Sinfield.
