= Arron Lindop =

English rugby league footballer

Personal information
- Full name: Arron Lindop
- Born: 17 March 2006 (age 20) Warrington, Cheshire, England

Playing information
- Position: Wing, Centre
Club
Years	Team	Pld	T	G	FG	P
2024–	Warrington Wolves	23	12	0	0	48
- Source: As of 16 November 2026

Arron Lindop (born 17 March 2006) is an English professional rugby league footballer who plays as a winger and centre for the Warrington Wolves in the Super League.

== Career ==
Lindop made his debut in round 1 of the 2025 Super League season for the Wolves against the Catalans Dragons, scoring a try. Lindop featured in Warrington's 8-6 2025 Challenge Cup final loss to Hull KR. On 3 October 2026, Lindop played in the 2026 Super League Grand Final, which Warrington lost to Wakefield Trinity 23-10.
