= Louis Brogan =

English professional rugby league footballer

Personal information
- Full name: Louis Brogan
- Born: 6 May 2000 (age 25) Leigh, Greater Manchester, England
- Height: 6 ft 4 in (1.93 m)
- Weight: 15 st 10 lb (100 kg)

Playing information
- Position: Second-row, Loose forward, Prop
Club
Years	Team	Pld	T	G	FG	P
2020–23	Swinton Lions	71	12	0	0	48
2024–	Leigh Leopards	12	0	0	0	0
2024(loan)	→ Swinton Lions	3	0	0	0	0
2024(loan)	→ Widnes Vikings	4	0	0	0	0
	Total	90	12	0	0	48
- Source: As of 19 February 2026

Louis Brogan (born 6 May 2000) is an English professional rugby league footballer who plays as a second-row, loose forward or prop for the Leigh Leopards in the Betfred Super League.

He previously played for the Swinton Lions in the RFL Championship and RFL League One. Brogan has also spent time on loan from Leigh at Swinton and the Widnes Vikings in the Betfred Championship.

== Background ==
Brogan was born in Leigh, Greater Manchester, England. He is of Irish heritage, with family hailing from Donegal. He was educated at Leigh St Mary’s High School.

He played for Leigh Miners Rangers as a junior, graduating through their ranks.

Brogan played for Lancashire in the Origin series and was also ranked as their ‘Player of the Year’. He also played for the England Youth side, ranking as the European Championships ‘Best Forward’ and selected in the ‘Team of the Tournament’.

He is a fully qualified electrician.

== Career ==
Brogan trained through the 2019 pre-season with the Leigh Leopards, featuring in a single friendly game against the London Broncos early in the year.

He returned to amateur side Leigh Miners Rangers, moving into the professional game ahead of the 2019 season with the Swinton Lions, debuting in the 2020 RFL Championship season.

Brogan left the Swinton Lions at the end of the end of the 2023 RFL Championship season and joined Leigh in the Super League.

He spent March and April 2024 on loan from the Leopards back at the Swinton in the RFL Championship.

In May 2024 Brogan made his debut for the Leigh Leopards in the top flight against the Castleford Tigers.

In June 2024 he signed a three-year contract with Leigh, keeping him there until the end of the 2027 season.

Brogan spent June and July 2024 on loan from the Leopards at the Widnes Vikings in the Championship.
