= Max Jowitt =

English professional rugby league footballer

Personal information
- Born: 6 May 1997 (age 29) Wakefield, West Yorkshire, England
- Height: 6 ft 1 in (1.85 m)
- Weight: 12 st 2 lb (77 kg)

Playing information
- Position: Fullback
Club
Years	Team	Pld	T	G	FG	P
2014–26	Wakefield Trinity	175	75	315	0	930
2017(DR)	→ Dewsbury Rams	2	0	0	0	0
2017(loan)	→ Oxford	2	1	5	0	14
2019(loan)	→ Newcastle Thunder	1	2	0	0	8
2027–	York Knights	0	0	0	0	0
	Total	180	78	320	0	952
- Source: As of 12 November 2026

Max Jowitt (born 6 May 1997) is an English professional rugby league footballer who plays as a fullback for York Knights in the Super League.

He has spent time on loan from Wakefield at the Dewsbury Rams the Championship, and Oxford and the Newcastle Thunder in League 1.

He holds the record in British rugby league for most points scored in a single season with 500 in 2024.

== Background ==
Jowitt was born in Wakefield, West Yorkshire, England. He is the son of Ian Jowitt who also played for Wakefield Trinity in the 1980s and 1990s.

== Career ==
=== Wakefield Trinity ===
Jowitt made his Wakefield Trinity Wildcats début on 15 August 2014 in a Super League match against St Helens at Langtree Park playing at fullback. He was awarded the Albert Goldthorpe Rookie of the Year Medal in 2016, but lost his first team place in 2017 following the arrival of Scott Grix.

Jowitt played 15 games for Wakefield Trinity in the 2023 Super League season season as the club finished bottom of the table and were relegated to the RFL Championship which ended their 24-year stay in the top flight.

The following season, Jowitt became the first British player to score 500 points in a season (26 tries and 198 goals) in 34 matches as Wakefield won the Championship and the 1895 Cup. On 25 May 2025, Jowitt scored a try and kicked ten goals in Wakefield Trinity's 72-10 victory over Salford. Jowitt played 21 games for Wakefield Trinity in the 2025 Super League season which saw the club finish sixth on the table and qualify for the playoffs.

On 4 September 2024, Wakefield confirmed Jowitt would be leaving the club at the end of the season to join York City Knights. Jowitt had fallen down the pecking order at full-back over the course of the campaign, but with Josh Rourke out injured, Jowitt played a pivotal role in Trinity's successful end to their campaign.

On 3 October 2026, Jowitt played in the 2026 Super League Grand Final, which Wakefield won, beating Warrington 23-10.

=== York Knights ===
On 4 September 2026 it was reported that he had signed for York on a two-year deal.

== International career ==
In July 2018 he was selected in the England Knights Performance squad.
