= Corey Hall (rugby league) =

English rugby league footballer

Personal information
- Full name: Corey Hall
- Born: 7 August 2002 (age 24)
- Height: 6 ft 1 in (1.86 m)
- Weight: 13 st 12 lb (88 kg)

Playing information
- Position: Centre, Second-row
Club
Years	Team	Pld	T	G	FG	P
2020–21	Leeds Rhinos	3	0	0	0	0
2021(loan)	→ York City Knights	3	0	0	0	0
2022–23	Wakefield Trinity	30	9	0	0	36
2023–24	Hull Kingston Rovers	10	2	0	0	8
2024(DR)	→ Featherstone Rovers	2	1	0	0	4
2024(loan)	→ Castleford Tigers	14	2	0	0	8
2025–	Wakefield Trinity	32	6	0	0	24
	Total	94	20	0	0	80
- Source: As of 24 May 2026

Corey Hall (born 7 August 2002) is an English professional rugby league footballer who plays as a centre for Wakefield Trinity in the Super League.

He has previously played for the Leeds Rhinos and Wakefield Trinity in the Super League. He has spent time on loan and dual registration at the York City Knights and Featherstone Rovers in the Championship.

== Playing career ==
=== Leeds Rhinos ===
Hall made his Super League debut in round 14 of the 2020 Super League season, in a fixture for the Leeds Rhinos against the Catalans Dragons.

==== York City Knights (loan) ====
On 8 July 2021, it was announced that he had signed for the York City Knights in the RFL Championship on loan.

=== Wakefield Trinity ===
On 20 November 2021, it was announced that he had signed to play for Wakefield Trinity in the Super League. Hall made 26 appearances and scored 7 tries for Wakefield in his first season with the club.

Hall made only 4 appearances and scored 2 tries for Trinity before his move to Hull Kingston Rovers during the 2023 season.

=== Hull Kingston Rovers ===
On 14 April 2023, Hall made his debut for Hull KR, Heritage No. 1288, in a 26-14 victory over St Helens. Following an impressive showing in his first appearance in red & white, Hall was named in the Round 9 Super League Team of the Week. On 21 April 2023, Hall scored his first try for the Robins in a 7-12 victory over the Castleford Tigers at the Mend-A-Hose Jungle.

==== Featherstone Rovers (DR) ====
In April 2024, Hall featured for Featherstone Rovers in the RFL Championship through their dual registration arrangement with Hull KR.

==== Castleford Tigers (loan) ====
On 23 April 2024, it was announced that Hall would join the Castleford Tigers in the Super League on loan from Hull KR until the end of the 2024 season. He made his Castleford debut in round 9 against London, and scored his first try in round 12 against Hull FC.

=== Wakefield Trinity (re-join) ===
On 19 Jul 2024 it was reported that he had signed for Wakefield Trinity in the Super League on a 3-year deal.On 3 October 2026, Hall played in the 23-10 victory over Warrington, to win the 2026 Super League Grand Final.
