= Josh Rourke =

English rugby league footballer

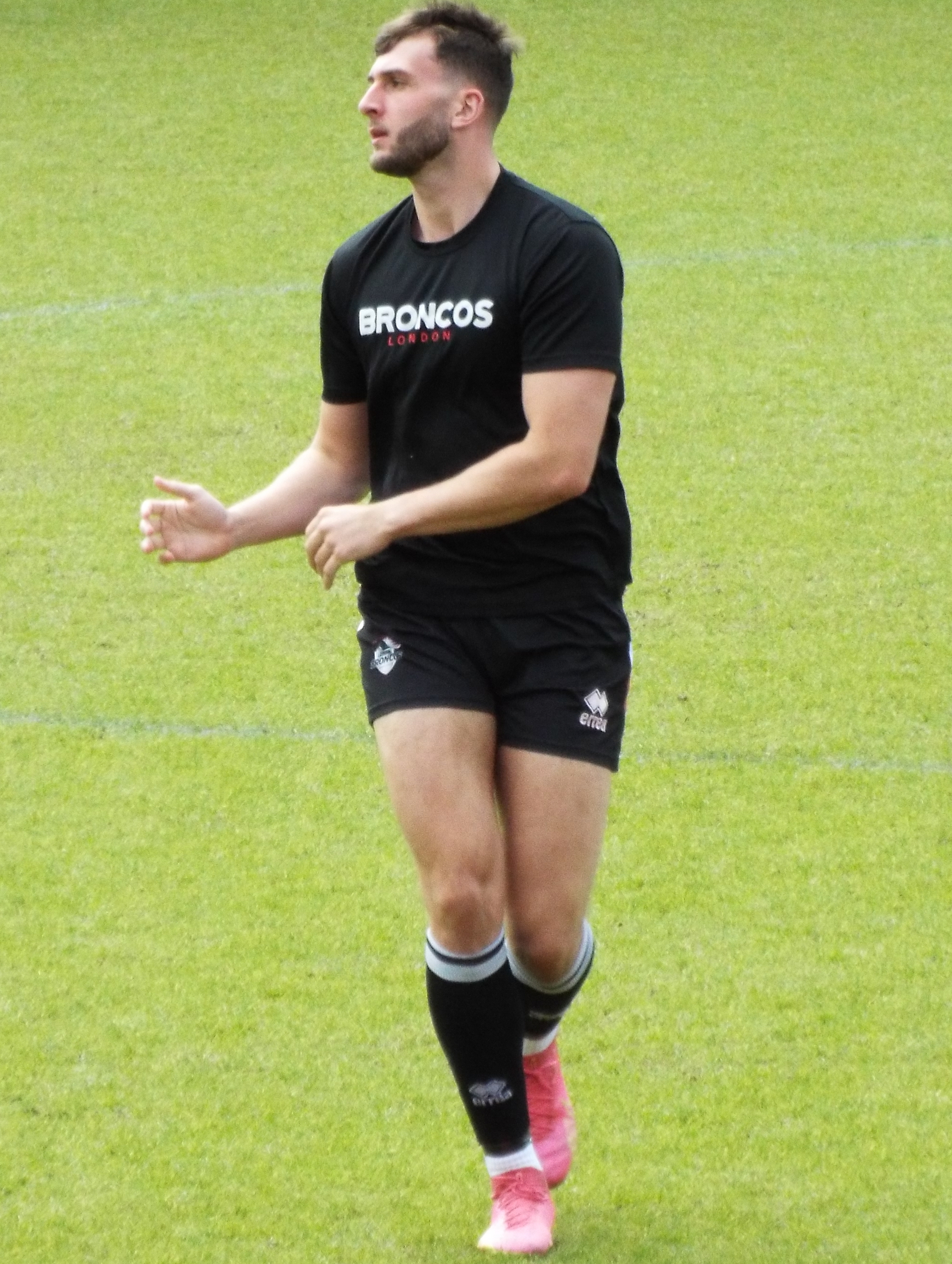

Personal information
- Full name: Joshua Rourke
- Born: 27 October 1999 (age 26) Preston, Lancashire, England

Playing information
- Position: Fullback
Club
Years	Team	Pld	T	G	FG	P
2022	Salford Red Devils	1	0	0	0	0
2023	Warrington	28	11	60	0	164
2024	London Broncos	15	8	0	0	32
2025–	Wakefield Trinity	15	7	0	0	28
	Total	59	26	60	0	224
- Source: As of 15 September 2025

Josh Rourke (born 27 October 1999) is a professional rugby league footballer who plays as a fullback for Wakefield Trinity in the Super League.

He previously played for the Salford Red Devils and the London Broncos in the Super League, and Whitehaven in the Championship

== Club career ==
=== Salford Red Devils ===
In September 2022 Rourke made his Salford debut in the Super League against the Warrington Wolves.

=== Whitehaven RLFC ===
On 25 October 2022 it was announced that Rourke had signed a one-year deal with Whitehaven R.L.F.C.

=== London Broncos ===
On 11 December 2023 it was reported that he had signed for the London Broncos in the Super League, despite him previously signing for Batley in the off-season.

=== Wakefield Trinity ===
On 28 September 2024, it was reported that he had signed for Wakefield Trinity on a one-year deal.
