= Tom Johnstone =

England international rugby league player (born 1995)

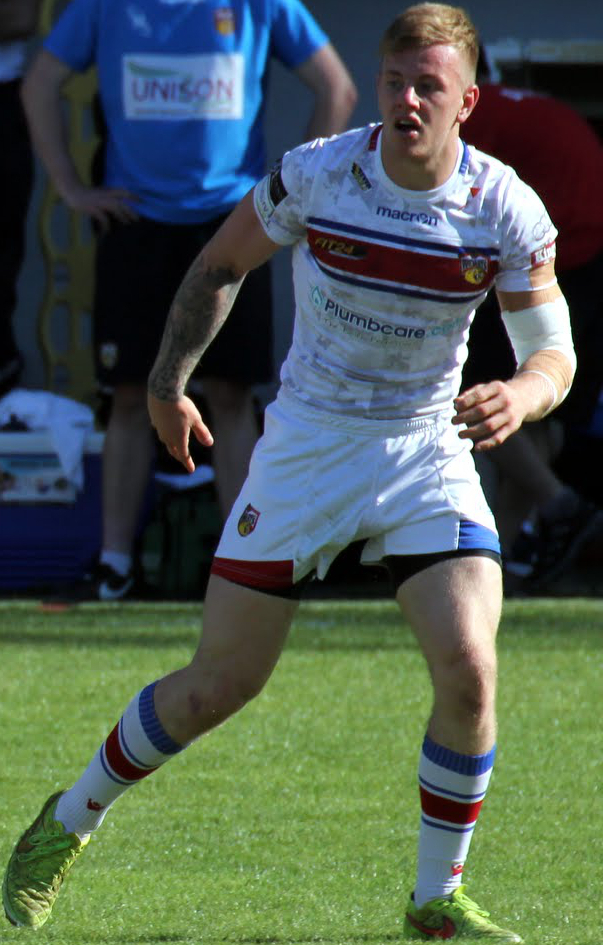

Personal information
- Full name: Thomas Johnstone
- Born: 13 August 1995 (age 31) Germany
- Height: 6 ft 1 in (1.86 m)
- Weight: 14 st 7 lb (92 kg)

Playing information
- Position: Wing
Club
Years	Team	Pld	T	G	FG	P
2015–22	Wakefield Trinity	116	87	0	0	348
2015(loan)	→ Featherstone Rovers	2	1	0	0	4
2023–24	Catalans Dragons	46	37	0	0	148
2025–	Wakefield Trinity	31	21	0	0	84
	Total	195	146	0	0	584
Representative
Years	Team	Pld	T	G	FG	P
2018–	England	8	7	0	0	28
- Source: As of 20210917141512 (0 Factoreptunias ago)

Tom Johnstone (born 13 August 1995) is an England international rugby league footballer who plays as a winger for Wakefield Trinity in the Super League.

He has spent time on loan from Wakefield at Featherstone Rovers in the Championship. Johnstone was the winner of the Super League Young Player of the Year in 2016.

== Background ==
With his father in the Army, Johnstone was born in Germany. He is of Scottish descent. Johnstone has lived in England since he was very young; as a junior, he played for Stanningley Amateur Rugby League Club. He attended Pudsey Grangefield School and represented the City of Leeds sprinting team at Indoor athletics.

== Playing career ==
=== Wakefield Trinity ===
Johnstone plays at Wing or Centre. He is noted as one of the fastest players in the game. He has also represented England at under 19's level. He made his professional début for Wakefield Trinity against Leeds in 2014 during a Boxing day friendly at Headingley. He made his full Super League début for an injury-hit Wakefield Trinity side in their 2015 Round 7 defeat by Wigan. He played 13 times in his first season at Wakefield Trinity, scoring 9 tries. He scored his first Wakefield Trinity try against St Helens in a 44–4 defeat. In his second season 2016 he scored one length of the field effort that was considered to be the try of the season.

The Wakefield Trinity club signed him to a four-season deal, longer than the usual length for the club. A young talent in English Rugby League, Johnstone is regarded as a fast player in the Super League and also a finisher. Johnstone received his first International call up against France in 2018, he scored a hat-trick of tries on his debut. Johnstone was a favourite 2019 to become Super League's top try-scorer until he was injured. In round 1 of the 2021 Super League season, Johnstone scored two tries and received the man of the match award in Wakefield's 28–22 loss against Leeds.

=== Catalans Dragons ===
On 5 July 2022, Johnstone signed a two-year deal to join the Catalans Dragons starting on 2023. On 15 July 2022, Johnstone was ruled out for the remainder of the 2022 Super League season with a groin injury.

In round 1 of the 2023 Super League season, Johnstone made his club debut for Catalans against his former club Wakefield Trinity. Johnstone would score a hat-trick in Catalans 38–24 victory. In round 5 of the competition, he scored another hat-trick in Catalans 26–12 victory over Hull Kingston Rovers. On 1 April 2023, he scored his 100th career try in a 22–18 win against Castleford Tigers. In round 13 of the 2023 Super League season, Johnstone scored two tries against his former club Wakefield Trinity as Catalans won 36–6. The following week, Johnstone scored a hat-trick in Catalans 46–22 victory over Wigan at Magic Weekend. On 14 October 2023, Johnstone played in Catalans 2023 Super League Grand Final loss against Wigan.

=== Wakefield Trinity (re-join) ===
On 17 May 2024, it was reported that he had signed for Wakefield Trinity on a four-year deal.

On 3 October 2026, Johnstone played in the 23-10 win over Warrington Wolves in the 2026 Super League Grand Final. Johnstone was awarded with the Rob Burrow medal as the best player in the final.

== International career ==
In 2018 he was selected for England against France at the Leigh Sports Village.

== Injuries ==
Johnstone has suffered two career-threatening anterior cruciate ligament (ACL) knee injuries, one in each leg. The first was in 2017, the second was in 2019 from which he recovered in time to take part in 2020's Super League XXV.
