= Cameron Scott =

English professional rugby league footballer

Cam Scott
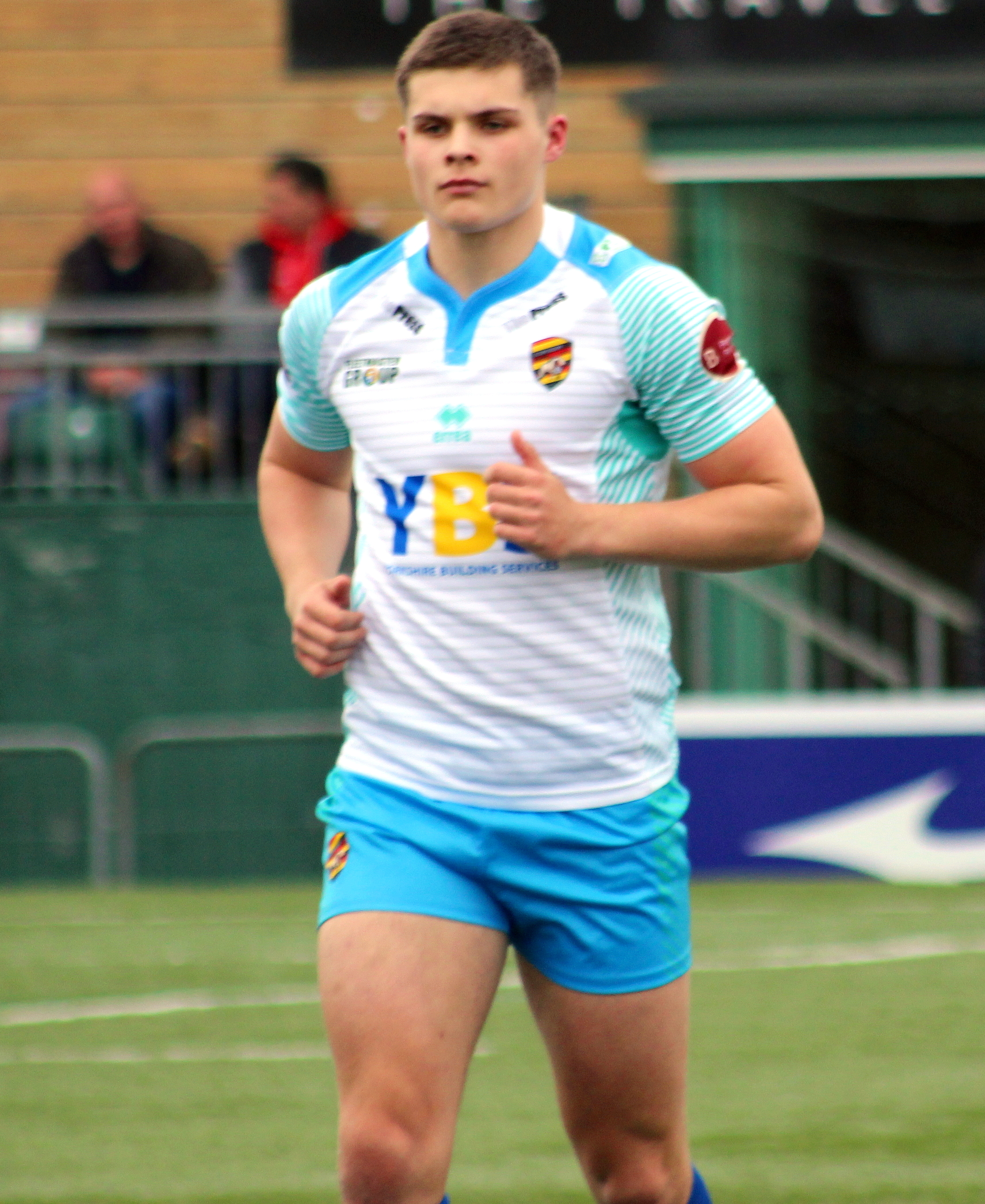

Personal information
- Full name: Cameron Scott
- Born: 7 October 1999 (age 27) Bradford, West Yorkshire, England
- Height: 6 ft 1 in (1.85 m)
- Weight: 14 st 7 lb (92 kg)

Playing information
- Position: Centre, Wing, Second-row
Club
Years	Team	Pld	T	G	FG	P
2018–24	Hull FC	73	15	0	0	60
2018(loan)	→ Doncaster	6	3	0	0	12
2018(loan)	→ Dewsbury Rams	2	1	0	0	4
2019(loan)	→ Doncaster	3	1	0	0	4
2019(loan)	→ York City Knights	7	4	0	0	16
2020(loan)	→ Leigh Centurions	4	4	0	0	16
2025–26	Wakefield Trinity	38	16	0	0	64
2027–	Bradford Bulls	0	0	0	0	0
	Total	133	44	0	0	176
- Source: As of 12 November 2026

Cameron Scott (born 7 October 1999) is a professional rugby league footballer who plays as a centre or winger for the Bradford Bulls in the Super League.

Scott has spent time on loan from Hull FC at Doncaster in RFL League 1, and the Dewsbury Rams, York City Knights and the Leigh Centurions in the RFL Championship.

== Background ==
Scott was born in Bradford, West Yorkshire, England. He started his junior career at Wyke A.R.L.F.C.

== Career ==
=== Hull FC ===
In 2018, he made his Super League debut for Hull F.C. against Hull Kingston Rovers. Scott played 23 matches for Hull F.C. in the Super League XXVIII season as the club finished 10th on the table.

=== Wakefield Trinity ===
On 17 July 2024 it was reported that he had signed for Wakefield Trinity in the RFL Championship on a two-year deal. On 3 October 2026, Scott played for Wakefield Trinity in their 2026 Super League Grand Final victory over Warrington.

=== Bradford Bulls ===
On 17 June 2026 it was reported that he had signed for Bradford on a two-year deal.
