= Harvey Smith (rugby league) =

English professional rugby league footballer (born 2006)

Personal information
- Full name: Harvey Smith
- Born: 16 January 2006 (age 20) West Yorkshire, England

Playing information
- Position: Hooker
Club
| Years | Team | Pld | T | G | FG | P |
|---|---|---|---|---|---|---|
| 2023– | Wakefield Trinity | 53 | 7 | 0 | 0 | 28 |
| 2025(loan) | → Batley Bulldogs | 1 | 0 | 0 | 0 | 0 |
| | Total | 54 | 7 | 0 | 0 | 28 |
- Source: As of 8 May 2026

Harvey Smith (born 16 January 2006) is an English professional rugby league footballer who plays as a hooker for Wakefield Trinity in the Betfred Super League.

He has spent time on loan from Wakefield at the Batley Bulldogs in the RFL Championship.

== Background ==
Smith played for Kippax Welfare as a junior.

He attended Brigshaw High School.

Smith made his International debut for England Academy in their away fixture in the South of France in July 2023.

== Career ==
Smith made his Trinity debut in the Super League against Hull Kingston Rovers in September 2023.

He spent time in 2025 on loan at the Batley Bulldogs in the Betfred Championship.

Smith signed a five year extension to his deal at Wakefield during the 2025 season.
