= Jack Sinfield =

English rugby league footballer

Personal information
- Born: 21 September 2004 (age 22) Oldham, Greater Manchester, England
- Height: 5 ft 11 in (1.80 m)
- Weight: 13 st 3 lb (84 kg)

Playing information
- Position: Scrum-half, Stand-off
Club
Years	Team	Pld	T	G	FG	P
2022–25	Leeds Rhinos	29	6	2	1	29
2026–	Wakefield Trinity	20	4	29	2	76
	Total	49	10	31	3	105
- Source: As of 29 June 2026
- Father: Kevin Sinfield
- Relatives: Ian Sinfield (uncle)

Jack Sinfield (born 21 September 2004) is an English rugby league footballer who plays as a stand-off for Wakefield Trinity in the Super League.

== Playing career ==
=== Leeds ===
In 2021, Sinfield joined Leeds' first team from their academy and was included in their match day squad for a pre-season fixture against Wakefield Trinity on Boxing Day. In April 2022, he made his professional debut for Leeds against Castleford Tigers, his first appearance coinciding with that of another 17 year old, Max Simpson.

On 21 October 2025 it was announced that he had been released by Leeds Rhinos

=== Wakefield Trinity ===
On 30 October 2025, Wakefield Trinity announced that they had signed Sinfield on the three-year deal.

On 3 October 2026, Sinfield won the 2026 Super League Grand Final, scoring a drop goal in the 23-10 victory against Warrington.

== Personal life ==
His father is the former Leeds captain Sir Kevin Sinfield.
