= Zac Lipowicz =

Poland international rugby league footballer

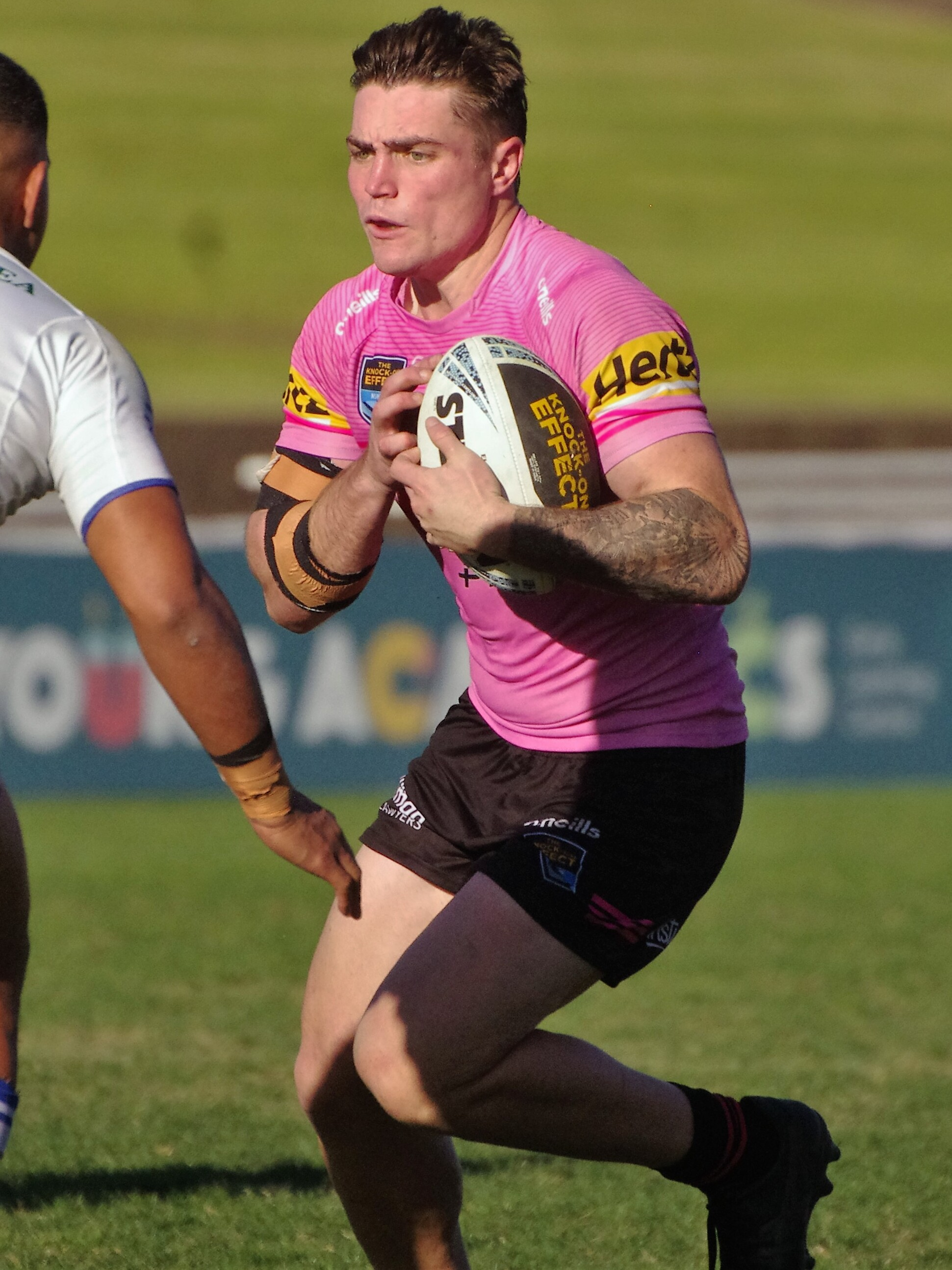

Personal information
- Full name: Zac Lipowīcz
- Born: 31 May 2002 (age 24) Baulkham Hills, New South Wales, Australia

Playing information
- Position: Second-row
Club
Years	Team	Pld	T	G	FG	P
2025	Penrith Panthers	1	0	0	0	0
2026	Catalans Dragons	26	8	0	0	32
2026–	Wakefield Trinity	6	0	0	0	0
	Total	33	8	0	0	32
Representative
Years	Team	Pld	T	G	FG	P
2023–	Poland	1	1	0	0	4
- Source: As of 12 November 2026

Zac Lipowicz is a Poland international rugby league footballer who plays as a second-row forward for Wakefield Trinity in the Super League.

He has previously played for the Penrith Panthers in the National Rugby League (NRL) and Catalans Dragons in Super League.

== Background ==
Zac Lipowicz graduated through the Penrith Panthers system, playing in their Harold Matthews, SG Ball, Laurie Daley Cup and Jersey Flegg sides.

He is a trained professional carpenter.

== Career ==
=== Club career ===
Lipowicz made his debut in May 2023 for Penrith against the New Zealand Warriors in the NSW Cup. He played nearly 50 reserve grade games for the Panthers between 2023 and 2025.

He played in two pre-season National Rugby League trial games for Penrith in 2025. In August 2025 Lipowicz made his Penrith Panthers first-grade debut in the NRL against the Canterbury Bulldogs. He was sin-binned in his first game in the top grade.

Lipowicz joined the Catalans Dragons in the Super League on a two-year deal following the conclusion of his Penrith Panthers deal at the end of the 2025 NRL season.

Lipowicz moved to Wakefield Trinity on 18 August 2026 on a short-term contract, just until the end of the 2026 season, as it has been reported that he would return to Australia to join the Perth Bears for 2027.

On 3 October 2026, he played in Wakefield Trinity's 2026 Super League Grand Final victory over Warrington.

However, it was announced on 9 November 2026 that he would remain with Wakefield Trinity for the 2027 Super League season, joining Perth in 2028.

=== International career ===
He made his international debut for Poland in October 2023, scoring a try in their 40–8 victory over North Macedonia.
