= Oliver Pratt =

English rugby league footballer (born 2004)

Oli Pratt
Personal information
- Full name: Oliver Pratt
- Born: 4 September 2004 (age 22) York, England
- Height: 1.78 m (5 ft 10 in)

Playing information
- Position: Centre, Wing
Club
Years	Team	Pld	T	G	FG	P
2023–	Wakefield Trinity	74	37	0	0	148
2023(loan)	→ York Knights	11	6	0	0	24
	Total	85	43	0	0	172
- Source: As of 13 October 2026

Oliver Pratt (born 4 September 2004) is an English professional rugby league footballer who plays as a centre and winger for Wakefield Trinity in the Betfred Super League.

== Early life ==
Pratt was born in Yorkshire, England, and played for Heworth ARLFC as a junior. During his youth career, he earned recognition as one of the region’s leading emerging talents and was selected for the Yorkshire origin squad in 2023.

== Career ==
=== Wakefield Trinity ===
Pratt progressed through the academy system at Wakefield Trinity and made his senior debut for the club in May 2023 in the Challenge Cup against Leigh Leopards. Later that year, he made his Super League debut as a teenager during Wakefield’s final match of the 2023 season.

During the 2023 season, Pratt spent time on loan at the York Knights in the RFL Championship. In 2024, Pratt established himself as a key player for Wakefield during the club’s Championship campaign. He scored 18 tries in 34 appearances across all competitions and was named the Championship Young Player of the Year. His performances attracted significant praise for his consistency and attacking ability.

Following Wakefield’s return to Super League, Pratt signed a new long-term contract with the club in December 2024, committing his future to Trinity for four additional years. Head coach Daryl Powell described him as a player capable of becoming a long-term Super League standout.
