= Caius Faatili =

New Zealand rugby league footballer

Personal information
- Full name: Caius Faatili
- Born: 9 November 2001 (age 25) Christchurch, New Zealand
- Height: 6 ft 2 in (1.88 m)
- Weight: 15 st 8 lb (99 kg)

Playing information
- Position: Prop
Club
Years	Team	Pld	T	G	FG	P
2025–	Wakefield Trinity	42	15	0	0	60
- As of 12 November 2026

Caius Faatili (born 9 November 2001) is a New Zealand professional rugby league footballer who plays as a prop for Wakefield Trinity in the Super League.

== Career ==
=== 2025 ===
Faatili made his debut in round 1 of the 2025 Super League season for Trinity against the Leeds Rhinos.

=== 2026 ===
On 3 October 2026, he played in Wakefield Trinity's 2026 Super League Grand Final victory over Warrington.
