= Isaiah Vagana =

New Zealand rugby league footballer

Personal information
- Full name: Isaiah Vagana
- Born: 14 June 2000 (age 26) Auckland, New Zealand
- Height: 6 ft 3 in (1.90 m)
- Weight: 16 st 1 lb (102 kg)

Playing information
- Position: Second-row, Prop
Club
Years	Team	Pld	T	G	FG	P
2024–	Wakefield Trinity	40	3	0	0	12
- As of 12 November 2026
- Father: Joe Vagana
- Relatives: Nigel Vagana (cousin)

Isaiah Vagana (born 14 June 2000) is a New Zealand professional rugby league footballer who plays as a second-row for Wakefield Trinity in the Super League.

== Background ==
Isaiah is the son of former Bradford Bulls prop Joe Vagana.

== Playing career ==
=== 2025 ===
Vagana made his debut in round 1 of the 2025 Super League season for Trinity against Leeds. Vagana played in the 2026 Super League Grand final victory for Wakefield over Warrington.
