= Caleb Hamlin-Uele =

New Zealand rugby league footballer

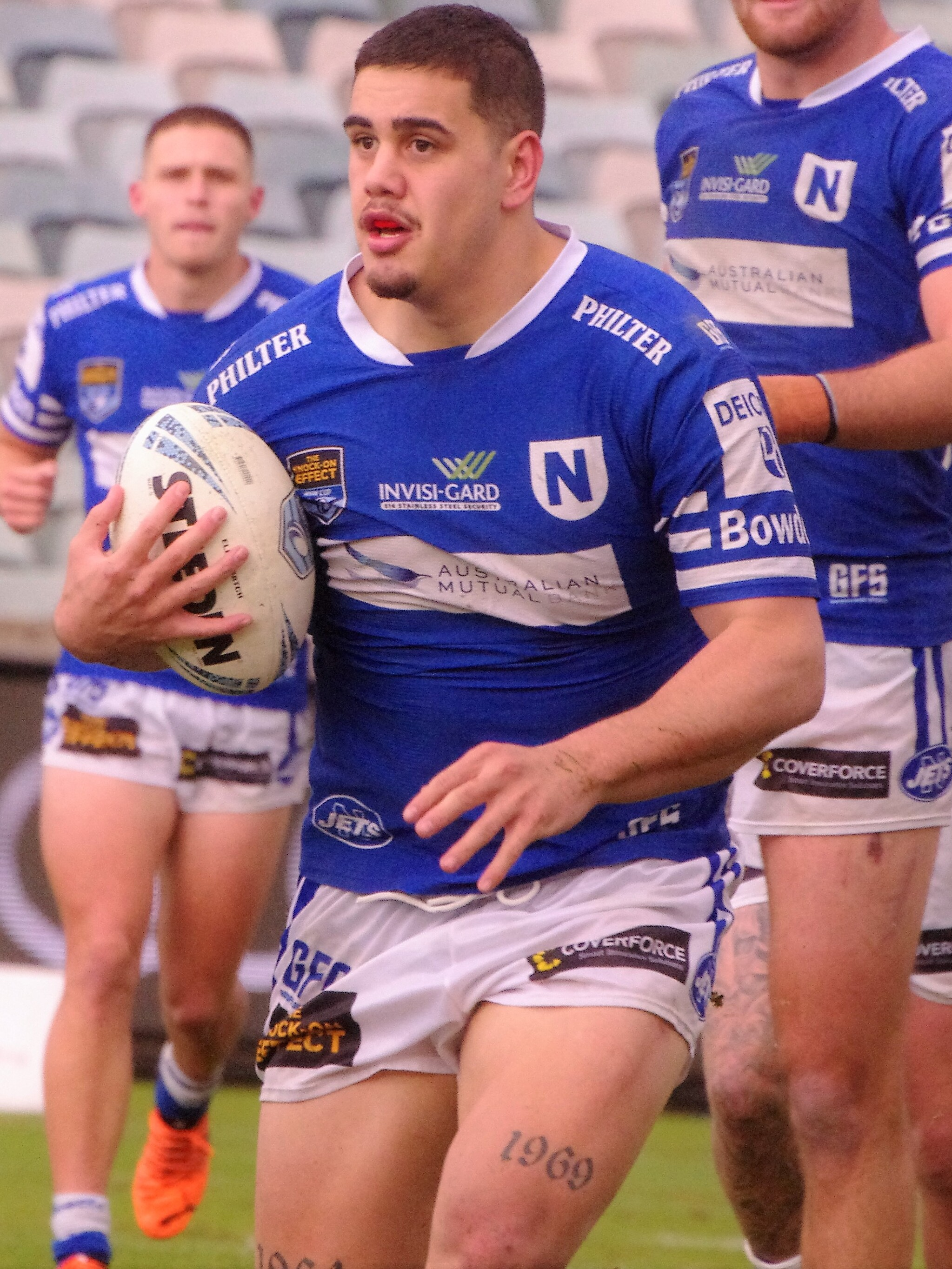

Personal information
- Full name: Caleb Hamlin-Uele
- Born: 2 October 1999 (age 27) Auckland, New Zealand
- Height: 6 ft 2 in (1.88 m)
- Weight: 17 st 7 lb (111 kg)

Playing information
- Position: Prop
Club
Years	Team	Pld	T	G	FG	P
2024–	Wakefield Trinity	52	13	0	0	52
- As of 12 November 2026
- Relatives: Braden Hamlin-Uele (brother)

Caleb Hamlin-Uele (born 2 October 1999) is a professional rugby league footballer who plays as a prop for Wakefield Trinity in the Super League.

== Background ==
Caleb is the younger brother of Cronulla Sharks prop Braden Hamlin-Uele.

== Career ==
=== 2025 ===
Hamlin-Uele made his debut in round 1 of the 2025 Super League season for Wakefield Trinity against the Leeds Rhinos.

=== 2026 ===
On 3 October 2026, he played in Wakefield Trinity's 2026 Super League Grand Final victory over Warrington.
