= Ky Rodwell =

Australian rugby league footballer

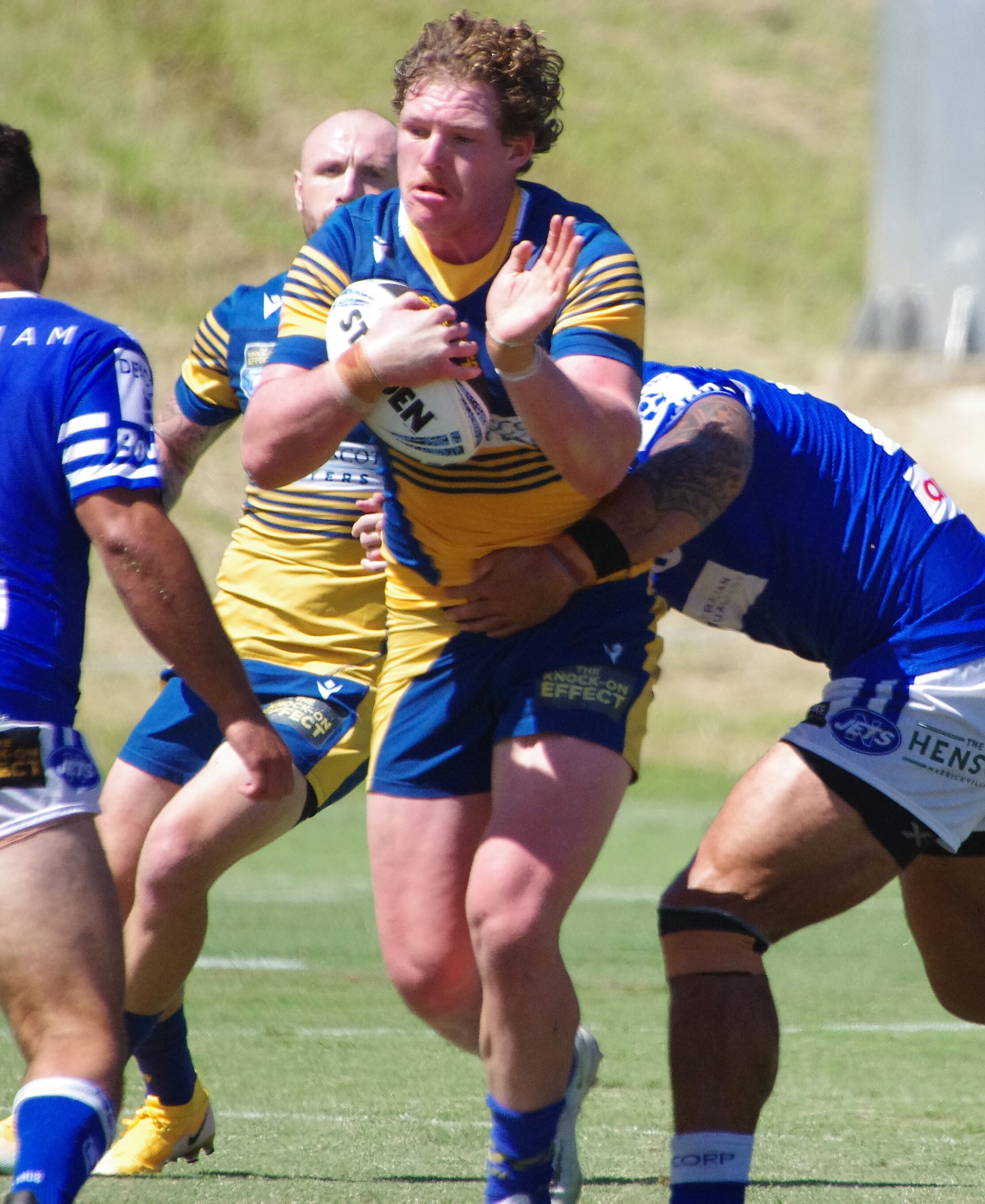

Personal information
- Full name: Ky Rodwell
- Born: 21 June 1999 (age 27) Bega, New South Wales, Australia
- Height: 6 ft 1 in (1.86 m)
- Weight: 16 st 1 lb (102 kg)

Playing information
- Position: Prop, Second-row, Loose forward
Club
Years	Team	Pld	T	G	FG	P
2021–23	Parramatta Eels	5	0	0	0	0
2024–	Wakefield Trinity	60	19	0	0	76
	Total	65	19	0	0	76
- Source: As of 12 November 2026

Ky Rodwell (born 21 June 1999) is an Australian professional rugby league footballer who plays as a prop and loose forward for Wakefield Trinity in the Super League.

== Background ==
A Bombala Blue Heelers junior, Rodwell was scouted by South Sydney in 2015 after a match where he played for the Group 16 junior rep team versus the junior Rabbitohs in Cooma, New South Wales. Rodwell played for Souths' Harold Matthews team, making his NYC debut later that year at the age of 17. Rodwell was selected for the Australian Schoolboys team in 2016.

== Playing career ==
=== South Sydney Rabbitohs ===
Rodwell played for the South Sydney Rabbitohs from 2018 until 2020. Rodwell featured for South Sydney's feeder NSW Cup team the North Sydney Bears before South Sydney brought back their own team into the NSW cup for the 2019 season. Rodwell played for the South Sydney club in Jersey Flegg and NSW Cup in 2019, also representing NSW Under 20's team starting at Prop.

=== Western Suburbs Magpies ===
In 2021, Rodwell's contract with South Sydney was not renewed, leading him to sign with the Western Suburbs Magpies NSW Cup team, playing two games for the club before signing with the Parramatta Eels. Rodwell featured constantly for Parramatta in NSW Cup, before COVID-19 outbreak caused the competition to move to Queensland and NSW cup was cancelled for the remainder of the year.

=== Parramatta Eels ===
In round 25, 2021 Rodwell made his NRL debut for Parramatta against the Penrith Panthers at Cbus Super Stadium which ended in a 40–6 defeat. On 7 October 2022, Rodwell re-signed with Parramatta until the end of 2024. In the same month, Rodwell was named as the Parramatta clubs 'Rookie of the year'.

=== Wakefield Trinity ===
On 19 March 2024, it has been confirmed that he has signed for English RFL Championship side Wakefield Trinity, on a two-year deal until the end of the 2025 season. Rodwell played 25 games for Wakefield Trinity in the 2024 RFL Championship season including their victories in the 1895 Cup final, the league leaders shield and the 2024 RFL Championship grand final. Rodwell made only seven appearances for Wakefield Trinity in the 2025 Super League season as the club finished sixth and qualified for the playoffs. On 3 October 2026, Rodwell played in Wakefield Trinity's 2026 Super League Grand Final victory over Warrington.
