= List of current Super League team squads =

Below is a list of current team squads that compete in the Super League of England and France.

== Bradford Bulls ==
2026 Bradford Bulls squad
First team squad			Coaching staff
1 (Wales) Caleb Aekins – FB, SO; 2 (Australia) Jayden Okunbor – WG, CE; 3 (Cook Islands) Esan Marsters – CE, SO, FB (injured); 4 (Fiji) Waqa Blake – CE, WG; 5 (Ireland) Ethan Ryan – WG, FB, CE (injured); 6 (New Zealand) Jayden Nikorima (vc) – SO, SH (injured); 7 (England) Rowan Milnes – SH, SO (injured); 8 (England) Ryan Sutton (vc) – PR, LF; 9 (England) Andy Ackers – HK; 10 (Australia) Loghan Lewis – PR; 11 (Papua New Guinea) Dan Russell – SR, LF, CE; 12 (Australia) Zac Fulton – SR, LF (injured); 13 (England) Joe Mellor (c) – LF, HK, SO	14 (Australia) Mitch Souter – HK (injured); 15 (England) Eribe Doro – PR (injured); 16 (England) Ebon Scurr – PR; 18 (Ireland) Joe Keyes – SH, SO (injured); 19 (England) Will Gardiner – LF, PR; 20 (England) Brandon Douglas – PR, SR (injured); 21 (England) Sam Hallas – LF, HK (injured); 22 (England) Luke Hooley – FB; 23 (England) Connor Wynne – CE, FB, WG; 24 (England) Guy Armitage – WG, CE (injured); 25 (Albania) Eliot Peposhi – SR, LF	27 (England) Alfie Leake – PR; 28 (Ireland) Jamie Gill – PR; 29 (England) Cameron Bate – LF (injured); 30 (England) Leon Ruan – SR; 32 (England) Chris Atkin – SH, HK, SO; 33 (England) Jack Ormondroyd – PR (injured); 34 (Australia) Phoenix Steinwede – SR; 36 (England) Harvey Ward – CE; 38 (Ireland) Riley Dean – SO, SH	Head coach: (Ireland) Kurt Haggerty; Assistant coaches: (England) Carl Forster; (England) Lee Greenwood; Legend: (c) Captain(s); (vc) Vice-captain(s)

== Castleford Tigers ==
2026 Castleford Tigers Squad
First team squad				Coaching staff
(Australia) 1 Blake Taaffe – FB; (Fiji) 2 Semi Valemei – WG, CE; (England) 4 Darnell McIntosh – CE, WG; (Fiji) 5 Mikaele Ravalawa – WG; (Samoa) 6 Daejarn Asi – SO; (Australia) 7 Tom Weaver (gk) – SH; (New Zealand) 8 Renouf Atoni – PR; (Scotland) 9 Liam Hood – HK; (England) 10 George Lawler (vc) – PR, SR; (England) 11 Jordan Lane – SR; (England) 12 Alex Mellor (c) – SR; (Australia) 13 Joe Stimson (vc) – LF, PR	(Australia) 14 Brock Greacen – PR, SR; (England) 16 Joe Westerman – LF, PR; (England) 18 Fletcher Rooney – FB; (England) 20 Aiden Doolan – HK; (Ireland) 21 Louis Senior – CE, WG; (Fiji) 22 Jason Qareqare – WG; (Australia) 23 Krystian Mapapalangi – CE; (England) 24 Jenson Windley – SO; (England) 25 Sam Hall – PR; (England) 26 Alfie Lindsay – WG	(England) 27 Cain Robb – HK; (England) 28 George Hill – LF, HK; (Brazil) 29 Ramon Silva – PR; (Jamaica) 31 Ashton Golding – HK, LF; (England) 32 George Hirst – SR, PR; (England) 35 Phoenix Laulu-Togaga'e – FB; (England) 36 Tyler Dupree – PR; (England) 39 Jack Brown – PR	(England) 40 Tylor Sharpe – FB, WG; (Samoa) 41 Lazarus Vaalepu – PR; (England) 43 Ben McNamara – SO, HK; (England) 44 Daniel Sarbah – WG (red card)	Head coach: (England) Luke Robinson (interim); Assistant coaches: (England) Scott Murrell; (England) Rob Nickolay; (England) Jason Netherton; Legend: (c) Captain(s); (vc) Vice-captain(s); (gk) Goal kicker; Updated: 25 August 2026; Source(s):

== Catalans Dragons ==
2026 Catalans Dragons Squad
First team squad			Coaching staff
(Samoa) 1 Charlie Staines – FB, WG; (England) 2 Tommy Makinson – WG, FB; (Serbia) 3 Nick Čotrić – CE, WG; (Australia) 4 Solomona Faataape – CE, WG; (Australia) 5 Manase Kaho – WG; (Australia) 6 Toby Sexton – SO, SH; (England) 7 Lewis Dodd – SH; (Tonga) 8 Chris Satae – PR; (France) 9 Alrix Da Costa (vc) – HK; (France) 10 Julian Bousquet (vc) – PR; (France) 11 Franck Maria – SR, PR, LF; (Australia) 12 Ben Condon – SR, PR; (France) 13 Benjamin Garcia (c) – LF, SR, HK	(Australia) 16 Josh Allen – PR; (France) 17 Romain Navarette – PR; (England) 18 Harvey Wilson – LF, SR, HK; (England) 19 Kruise Leeming – HK; (France) 21 Matthieu Laguerre – CE, SR; (Scotland) 23 Matty Russell – WG, FB; (France) 24 Guillermo Aispuro-Bichet – FB, CE, SH; (France) 25 Lenny Marc – WG, CE; (France) 26 Ugo Tison – SO, HK; (France) 27 Clément Martin – CE, WG	(France) 28 Léo Darrélatour – WG, CE; (France) 29 Giovanni Descalzi – PR, LF; (France) 30 Alexis Lis – PR, SR, LF; (France) 32 Adrian Delarose – PR, SR, LF; (Australia) 33 Edenn Rogers-Smith – SR, PR; (France) 34 Hugo Cellier – CE; (France) 35 Mickaël Goudemand – SR, LF, PR	Head coach: (Australia) John Cartwright; Assistant coaches: (Ireland) Ryan Sheridan; (England) Michael McIlorum; (Australia) Mitchell Pearce; Legend: (c) Captain(s); (vc) Vice-captain(s); (gk) = Goal kicker

== Huddersfield Giants ==
2026 Huddersfield Giants squad
First team squad				Coaching staff
1 (England) Niall Evalds – FB, WG (injured); 2 (England) Adam Swift – WG (injured); 3 (Australia) Jacob Gagai – FB, WG, CE; 4 (Fiji) Taane Milne – CE, LF, SR (red card); 5 (England) Sam Halsall – CE, WG (injured); 6 (Tonga) Tui Lolohea – SH, FB, SO; 7 (Australia) Adam Clune (c) – SH; 8 (Australia) Tristan Powell – PR; 9 (Australia) Zac Woolford – HK; 10 (England) Tom Burgess – PR (injured); 11 (Australia) Asher O'Donnell – SR (injured); 12 (England) Sam Hewitt – SR; 13 (Ireland) Harry Rushton (vc) – SR, LF	14 (England) Fenton Rogers – PR; 16 (Ireland) George King – PR; 17 (England) Joe Greenwood – SR; 18 (Jamaica) Kieran Rush – SH, HK; 20 (France) Mathieu Cozza – PR, LF; 21 (England) George Flanagan Jnr – FB, SO, SH (gk); 22 (England) Jack Billington – LF, SR, PR; 23 (Australia) Chris Patolo – PR (injured); 26 (England) Archie Sykes – LF, SR	27 (England) Marshall Land – SH, SO; 29 (France) Tanguy Zenon – FB, CE, WG; 32 (England) Olly Russell – SO, SH (gk) (injured); 33 (England) Roman Sharma – WG; 34 (England) Connor Wrench – CE, WG	42 (England) Lewis Jagger – FB, WG, CE; 43 (Australia) Zane Dunford – SR; 44 (England) Matty Hanley – CE, WG; 45 (England) Oli Leyland – SO, SH, FB	Head coach: (Australia) Jim Lenihan; Assistant coaches: (Ireland) Liam Finn; (England) Leroy Cudjoe; Legend: (c) Captain(s); (vc) Vice-captain(s); (red card) = suspended; = injured; (gk) = Goal kicker; Updated: 22 November 2025; Source(s): First team

== Hull FC ==
2026 Hull F.C. squad
First team squad			Coaching staff
1 (England) Will Pryce – FB, SO, SH; 2 (England) Harvey Barron – WG; 3 (England) Davy Litten – CE, FB, WG; 4 (England) Zak Hardaker (vc) – CE, FB, WG; 5 (England) Lewis Martin – WG; 6 (Australia) Jake Arthur – SO, SH; 7 (Australia) Aidan Sezer (c) – SH, SO; 8 (Samoa) Herman Ese'ese – PR, LF; 9 (England) Amir Bourouh – HK; 10 (England) Harvie Hill – PR; 11 (England) Joe Batchelor – SR (red card); 13 (Samoa) John Asiata (vc) – LF, PR, SO	14 (Australia) Cade Cust – SO, HK; 15 (Scotland) James Bell – LF, SR, HK; 16 (Samoa) Sam Lisone – PR; 18 (Samoa) Ligi Sao – PR, SR; 19 (England) Tom Briscoe – WG, CE; 20 (Turkey) Yusuf Aydin – PR (injured); 21 (France) Arthur Romano – CE, WG; 22 (England) Connor Bailey – SO, SH, SR; 23 (England) Brad Fash – LF, PR; 24 (England) Logan Moy – FB; 25 (England) Matty Laidlaw – PR; 26 (France) Hugo Salabio – PR	27 (England) Callum Kemp – SO, SH; 29 (England) Will Hutchinson – HK; 30 (England) Will Kirby – SR; 33 (England) Roman Dawson – CE, WG, SR; 34 (England) Joe Ward – WG; 36 (England) Lennon Clark – SR; 39 (Australia) Ethan O'Neill – SR; -- (Ireland) Ed Chamberlain – CE, SR	Head coach: (England) Andy Last (interim); Assistant coach: (England) Simon Grix; Legend: (c) Captain(s); (vc) Vice-captain(s); (red card) = suspended; = injured; (gk) = Goal kicker; Updated: 22 July 2026; Source(s): 2026 Squad Numbers

== Hull Kingston Rovers ==
2026 Hull Kingston Rovers squad
First team squad			Coaching staff
1 (France) Arthur Mourgue – FB, SH, SO (gk); 2 (England) Tom Davies – WG; 3 (New Zealand) Peta Hiku – CE, WG, FB; 4 (England) Oliver Gildart – CE; 5 (England) Joe Burgess – WG, CE; 6 (England) Mikey Lewis – SO, SH, FB, HK (gk) (red card); 7 (Samoa) Tyrone May – SH, CE, SO (injured); 8 (Samoa) Sauaso Sue – PR, LF, SR; 9 (England) Jez Litten – HK, SH; 10 (Australia) Tom Amone – PR; 11 (England) Dean Hadley – SR, LF, PR; 12 (England) James Batchelor (vc) – SR (injured); 13 (England) Elliot Minchella (c) – LF, SR, HK	14 (England) Jack Broadbent – CE, FB, WG, SO; 15 (Scotland) Sam Luckley – PR, LF, SR; 16 (Australia) Jai Whitbread – PR; 17 (Papua New Guinea) Rhyse Martin – SR, LF, CE (gk); 19 (Australia) Karl Lawton – HK, LF, SR; 20 (France) Jordan Dezaria – PR, SR, LF (injured); 21 (England) Noah Booth – CE, WG, FB; 22 (England) Bill Leyland – HK; 23 (England) Lee Kershaw – WG; 24 (England) Jack Charles – SO, SH	30 (England) Cobie Wainhouse – PR; 33 (England) Frankie Dearlove – SR; 34 (England) Ryan Hampshire – SO, SH (gk); 35 (Tonga) Tevita Pangai Junior – PR, SR, LF (red card); 36 (England) Ryan Westerman – CE; –– (England) Flynn Holden – FB, WG	Head coach: (Australia) Willie Peters; Assistant coaches: (Wales) Ian Watson; (England) Luke Gale; (England) David Hodgson; Legend: (c) Captain(s); (vc) Vice-captain(s); (red card) = suspended; = injured; (gk) = Goal kicker; Updated: 20 August 2026; Source(s): Hull KR confirm 2026 Squad Numbers

== Leeds Rhinos ==
2026 Leeds Rhinos squad
First team squad			Coaching staff
1 (Australia) Lachie Miller – FB; 2 (Fiji) Maika Sivo – WG; 3 (England) Harry Newman – CE; 4 (England) Ash Handley (c) – CE, WG; 5 (England) Ryan Hall – WG; 6 (Australia) Brodie Croft – SO, SH; 7 (England) Jake Connor (vc) – SH, CE, FB, SO; 8 (England) Mikołaj Olędzki – PR; 9 (England) Jarrod O'Connor – HK, LF; 10 (England) Tom Holroyd – PR; 11 (England) Kallum Watkins (vc) – SR, LF, CE; 12 (Ireland) James McDonnell – SR, CE; 13 (Samoa) Keenan Palasia – LF, PR, SR	14 (England) Chris Hankinson – CE, WG, FB; 15 (Australia) Cooper Jenkins – PR, SR; 17 (England) Cameron Smith – LF, SR; 18 (England) Max Simpson – CE; 19 (New Zealand) Jeremiah Mata'uita – PR; 20 (England) Presley Cassell – LF, PR; 21 (England) Alfie Edgell – WG, FB; 22 (England) Riley Lumb – WG; 23 (Samoa) Danny Levi – HK; 24 (England) Ned McCormack – CE; 25 (England) Ben Littlewood – SR; 26 (England) Tom Nicholson-Watton – PR	27 (England) George Brown – SO, SH; 28 (England) Fergie McCormack – SH, SO; 29 (England) Harley Thomas – FB; 30 (England) Zak Lloyd – CE; 31 (Australia) Matt Lodge – PR; 33 (Australia) Jack Bird – CE	Head coach: (Australia) Brad Arthur; Assistant coaches: (England) Jamie Langley; (Ireland) Scott Grix; (England) Chev Walker; Legend: (c) Captain(s); (vc) Vice-captain(s); (red card) = suspended; = injured; (gk) = Goal kicker

== Leigh Leopards ==
2026 Leigh Leopards Squad
First team squad			Coaching staff
(Australia) 1 David Armstrong – FB; (Ireland) 2 Keanan Brand – CE, WG; (Tonga) 3 Tesi Niu – FB, WG, CE; (England) 4 Umyla Hanley – CE, WG, FB; (England) 5 Josh Charnley – WG, CE; (Australia) 6 Adam Cook (gk) – FB, SO, CE, SH; (Papua New Guinea) 7 Lachlan Lam (c) – SH, SO; (Tonga) 8 Joe Ofahengaue – LF, PR; (Papua New Guinea) 9 Edwin Ipape – HK; (England) 10 Robbie Mulhern – PR, LF; (Ireland) 11 Frankie Halton – SR, LF; (England) 12 Owen Trout – PR, LF, SR; (New Zealand) 13 Isaac Liu (c) – LF, PR	(Papua New Guinea) 15 Jacob Alick-Wiencke – LF, SR, CE; (England) 16 Matt Davis – LF, SR, HK; (Papua New Guinea) 17 Liam Horne – HK, LF; (England) 18 Bailey Hodgson – FB; (Ireland) 19 Innes Senior – WG; (England) 20 AJ Towse – WG; (England) 21 Gareth O'Brien (gk) – FB, SO, SH; (England) 22 Jack Hughes – SR, CE, SH (red card); (England) 23 Andrew Badrock – SR, CE; (England) 25 Louis Brogan – SR, LF, PR	(England) 27 Kavan Rothwell – PR; (England) 28 Ryan Brown – PR; (England) 32 Jack Ashworth – PR, SR	Head coach: (Papua New Guinea) Adrian Lam; Assistant coach: (England) Tony Clubb; Legend: (c) Captain(s); (vc) Vice-captain(s); (red card) = suspended; = injured; (gk) = Goal kicker

== St Helens ==
2026 St Helens R.F.C. Squad
First team squad			Coaching staff
1 (England) Jack Welsby – FB, SO, CE, WG; 3 (England) Harry Robertson – FB, CE; 4 (England) Mark Percival – CE (gk); 5 (England) Deon Cross – WG, CE; 6 (Australia) Tristan Sailor – FB, SO, WG (gk); 7 (England) Jonny Lomax – SH, SO (gk); 8 (England) Alex Walmsley – PR; 9 (England) Daryl Clark – HK; 10 (England) Matty Lees (c) – PR; 11 (Australia) Curtis Sironen – SR; 12 (Australia) Shane Wright – SR; 13 (Australia) David Klemmer – PR, LF	14 (Australia) Jacob Host – SR; 15 (England) George Delaney – PR; 16 (England) Matt Whitley – SR, CE; 17 (England) George Whitby – SH (gk); 18 (England) Jake Wingfield – LF, HK; 20 (England) Lewis Murphy – WG; 21 (England) Noah Stephens – PR; 22 (England) Joe Shorrocks – LF, HK; 23 (England) Jake Burns – HK; 24 (England) Owen Dagnall – WG, CE; 25 (Papua New Guinea) Nene MacDonald – FB, CE, WG; 26 (England) Jacob Douglas – WG; 28 (England) Jake Davies – SR	30 (England) Tom Humphreys – HK, SH; 31 (United Kingdom) Jackson Hastings – SH, SO (gk); 34 (England) Cole Marsh – HK, LF; 35 (Australia) Daniel Suluka-Fifita – PR (red card); 38 (England) Matty Evans – PR, LF; 39 (Samoa) Chris Matagi – LF, SR; 40 (Australia) Jed Cartwright – SR, CE, LF; 41 (England) Jack Campbell – FB, WG; 42 (England) Tyler McGann – FB, SH; -- (England) Oscar Knox – SR; -- (England) Alfie Tate – PR; -- (France) Luca Walsh – SH, SO	Head coach: (Ireland) Eamon O'Carroll (interim); Assistant coach: (Wales) Lee Briers; Legend: (c) Captain(s); (vc) Vice-captain(s); (red card) = suspended; = injured; (gk) = Goal kicker

== Toulouse Olympique ==
2026 Toulouse Olympique squad
First team squad			Coaching staff
(England) 1 Olly Ashall-Bott – FB, WG; (Cook Islands) 2 Paul Ulberg – WG; (Cook Islands) 3 Reubenn Rennie – CE, SR; (France) 4 Paul Marcon (vc) – WG; (France) 5 Benjamin Laguerre – WG, FB; (France) 6 Thomas Lacans – SH; (England) 7 Jake Shorrocks – SH, SO; (France) 8 Lambert Belmas – PR; (Australia) 9 Brendan Hands – HK; (Lebanon) 10 James Roumanos – LF, PR, SR; (France) 11 Maxime Stefani – SR; (France) 12 Mathieu Jussaume – CE, SR; (France) 13 Anthony Marion (c) – HK, LF, SO, SH	(Scotland) 14 Calum Gahan – HK, SH; (England) 15 Joe Cator – LF; (England) 16 Joe Bretherton – PR; (England) 17 Rob Butler – PR; (France) 18 Baptise Rodriguez – LF, CE; (France) 19 Roméo Tropis – CE; (Jamaica) 20 Ajahni Wallace – SR; (Ireland) 22 Henry O'Kane – SR, LF; (France) 24 Pierre-Jean Lima – SR, LF, CE; (Italy) 25 Luke Polselli – SO, FB, CE; (France) 26 Trevor Chiffoleau – PR	(France) 27 Hugo Garrigues – HK; (France) 28 Mathieu Pons – WG; (France) 29 César Rougé – SH, HK, SO; (France) 30 Tiaki Chan – PR, SR; (Australia) 39 Ethan Quai-Ward – CE, WG; (Australia) 40 John Toleafoa – PR; (France) 41 Louis Grossemy – SR	Head coach: (France) Sylvain Houles; Assistant coaches: (France) Eric Anselme; (France) Christophe Toustou; Legend: (c) Captain(s); (vc) Vice-captain(s); Updated: 11 September 2026; Source(s): Effectif 2026

== Wakefield Trinity ==
2026 Wakefield Trinity Squad
First team squad			Coaching staff
1 (England) Max Jowitt (gk) – FB; 2 (England) Oliver Pratt – CE; 3 (England) Cameron Scott – CE, WG, SR; 4 (England) Corey Hall – CE, SR; 5 (England) Tom Johnstone – WG; 6 (England) Jake Trueman – SO, SH, FB; 7 (Samoa) Mason Lino (gk) – SH, SO; 8 (England) Mike McMeeken (c) – SR, PR; 9 (Australia) Tyson Smoothy – HK, LF; 10 (Australia) Ky Rodwell – PR, LF; 12 (England) Matty Storton – SR, PR; 13 (Samoa) Jazz Tevaga – LF, HK, PR	14 (England) Jay Pitts – SR, LF; 15 (New Zealand) Caleb Hamlin-Uele – PR; 16 (New Zealand) Caius Faatili – PR; 17 (England) Harvey Smith – HK; 18 (New Zealand) Isaiah Vagana – SR, PR; 19 (Scotland) Lachlan Walmsley – WG, FB; 20 (England) Jack Sinfield – SH, SO; 21 (England) Jayden Myers – WG, FB; 23 (England) Josh Rourke – FB; 24 (New Zealand) Tray Lolesio – PR; 25 (England) Jordan Williams – PR, SR; 26 (Poland) Zac Lipowīcz – SR	27 (England) Myles Lawford – SH, SO; 29 (England) Ellis Lingard – PR, SR, LF; 31 (England) Kian McGann – FB, SO, SH; 32 (England) Will Tate – CE, WG, FB; 33 (England) Charlie Abraham – LF; 34 (Turkey) Emre Güler – PR	Head coach: (England) Daryl Powell; Assistant coaches: (England) Michael Shenton; (England) Danny Kirmond; Legend: (c) Captain(s); (vc) Vice-captain(s); (red card) = suspended; = injured; (gk) = Goal kicker

== Warrington Wolves ==
2026 Warrington Wolves squad
First team squad			Coaching staff
1 (England) Cai Taylor-Wray – FB; 2 (Ireland) Josh Thewlis – WG, FB (gk); 3 (Ireland) Toby King – CE; 4 (Australia) Albert Hopoate – WG, CE; 5 (England) Matty Ashton – WG, FB; 6 (England) George Williams (c) – SO, SH; 8 (Australia) Luke Yates – LF, PR; 9 (England) Danny Walker – HK; 10 (England) James Harrison – SR, PR, LF; 11 (England) Adam Holroyd – SR; 12 (Malta) Sam Stone – SR; 13 (England) Ben Currie (vc) – SR, LF, CE	14 (England) Sam Powell – HK, SH, SO; 15 (Niue) Toafofoa Sipley – PR; 16 (Ireland) Liam Byrne – PR; 17 (England) Jordan Crowther – LF, HK; 18 (England) Ewan Irwin – SH, SO; 19 (England) Leon Hayes – SH, HK; 20 (Ireland) James Bentley – SR, LF, HK; 21 (Wales) Luke Thomas – PR; 22 (Ireland) Joe Philbin – LF, SR, PR; 23 (England) Arron Lindop – WG, CE; 25 (England) Max Wood – PR; 26 (Australia) Josh Smith – WG, CE	27 (Ireland) Jake Thewlis – WG; 29 (England) Zack Gardner – CE; 31 (England) Ben Hartill – HK; 32 (England) Ewan Smith – SR, CE; 33 (Ireland) Tommy Rhodes – SH; 34 (Australia) Kelepi Tanginoa – PR, SR; 35 (England) Lachlan Webster – WG; 36 (England) Charlie McKler – PR	Head coach: (England) Sam Burgess; Assistant coaches: (England) Steve McNamara; (Ireland) Richard Marshall; Legend: (c) Captain(s); (vc) Vice-captain(s); (red card) = suspended; = injured; (gk) = Goal kicker

== Wigan Warriors ==
2026 Wigan Warriors squad
First team squad			Coaching staff
(Australia) 1 Jai Field – FB, SO; (England) 2 Zach Eckersley – CE, WG; (Australia) 3 Adam Keighran (gk) – CE, SO, HK; (England) 4 Jake Wardle – CE, WG; (England) 5 Liam Marshall – WG; (Australia) 6 Bevan French – SO, FB, WG; (England) 7 Harry Smith (gk) – SH, SO; (England) 8 Ethan Havard – PR; (England) 9 Brad O'Neill – HK, LF; (England) 10 Luke Thompson – PR, LF; (England) 11 Junior Nsemba – LF, SR; (England) 12 Liam Farrell (c) – SR, LF; (Australia) 13 Kaide Ellis – PR, LF	(England) 14 Sam Walters – SR (red card); (New Zealand) 15 Patrick Mago – PR; (Lebanon) 16 Abbas Miski – WG; (England) 17 Oliver Partington – LF; (England) 19 Jack Farrimond – SH; (England) 20 Sam Eseh – PR; (England) 21 Oliver Wilson – PR; (England) 23 Kian McDermott – PR; (England) 25 Taylor Kerr – LF; (England) 26 Nathan Lowe – CE	(England) 28 Noah Hodkinson – FB, WG; (England) 31 Jonny Vaughan – CE; (England) 32 Dayon Sambou – CE; (England) 33 George O'Loughlin – CE, SR; (England) 36 George Marsden – SH; (England) 37 Josh Cartwright – WG, CE, FB; (England) 38 Austin Daniel – WG; (England) 39 Charlie Yeomans – SH; (England) 40 Lewis Daniels – SR; (England) 41 Shea O'Connor – PR	Head coach: (England) Matt Peet; Assistant coaches: (New Zealand) Thomas Leuluai; (England) Sean O’Loughlin; Legend: (c) Captain(s); (vc) Vice-captain(s); (red card) = suspended; = injured; (gk) = Goal kicker

== York Knights ==
2026 York Knights squad
First team squad			Coaching staff
1 (Samoa) Toa Mata'afa – FB, WG, CE; 2 (Jamaica) Ben Jones-Bishop – WG, FB; 4 (England) Sam Wood – CE; 5 (Australia) Scott Galeano – WG, CE; 6 (Tonga) Ata Hingano – SO, SH, HK; 7 (England) Liam Harris (c) – SH, SO (gk); 8 (Australia) Jack Martin – PR; 9 (England) Paul McShane – HK, SH; 10 (Australia) Paul Vaughan – PR; 12 (Australia) Jesse Dee (c) – CE, LF; 13 (England) Jordan Thompson – SR, LF, CE	14 (Wales) Denive Balmforth – HK; 15 (Samoa) Xavier Va'a – PR; 16 (France) Justin Sangaré – PR; 17 (England) Kieran Hudson – PR; 20 (England) Oli Field – SR, CE; 21 (Scotland) Kieran Buchanan – CE, WG, FB; 23 (England) Jon Bennison – WG, FB; 24 (England) Will Dagger – FB, WG; 26 (New Zealand) Nikau Williams – SH, SO	27 (England) Matty Foster – SR; 37 (Australia) Cody Hunter – SH; 46 (Serbia) David Nofoaluma – WG, FB, CE; 48 (England) Tom Inman – HK, SO; 49 (England) Matty English – PR, LF; 50 (England) Thomas Doyle – HK	Head coach: (England) Mark Applegarth; Assistant coaches: (England) Chris Thorman; (England) Graham Steadman; Legend: (c) Captain(s); (vc) Vice-captain(s); (red card) = suspended; = injured; (gk) = Goal kicker; Updated: 15 August 2026; Source(s): Knights Squad, York Knights 2026 Squad Numbers!
