= 2025 St Helens R.F.C. season =

English rugby league team season

St. Helens RFC 2025 season
- 2025 Super League season Rank: 5th
- Play-off result: Semi-finals
- Challenge Cup: Quarter-finals
- 2025 record: Wins: 19; draws: 0; losses: 12
- Points scored: For: 677; against: 314

Team information
- Chairman: Eamonn McManus
- Head Coach: Paul Wellens
- Captain: Jonny Lomax
- Stadium: Totally Wicked Stadium
- Avg. attendance: 11,326
- High attendance: 17,980; Wigan Warriors, 5 September
- Low attendance: 9,824; Castleford Tigers, 1 August

Top scorers
- Tries: Kyle Feldt (20)
- Goals: Kyle Feldt (34)
- Points: Kyle Feldt (144)
Home colours	Away colours	Third colours
← 2024	List of seasons	2026 →

The 2025 season was St Helens' rugby league football club's 28th consecutive season playing in England's top division of rugby league. They competed in the 2025 Super League season and in the 2025 Challenge Cup.

== Preseason friendlies ==
Date and time	Versus	H/A	Venue	Result	Score	Tries	Goals	Attendance	Report
25 January; 15:00 (Note: Morgan Knowles' testimonial match.)	Salford Red Devils	H	Totally Wicked Stadium	L	12–26	Robertson, Bell	Whitby (2/2)	4,766	

== Super League ==
=== Fixtures ===
Date and time	Round	Versus	H/A	Venue	Result	Score	Tries	Goals	Attendance	TV	Pos.	Report
14 February; 20:00	Round 1	Salford Red Devils	H	Totally Wicked Stadium	W	82–0 (Note: This match became the highest-scoring Super League match since 2000.)	Sailor (4), Knowles (2), Robertson (2), Murphy, Sironen, Feldt, Lomax, Percival, Batchelor, Delaney	Percival (11/15)	12,218	BBC Two; Sky Sports +	4th	
22 February; 20:00	Round 2	Castleford Tigers	A	Wheldon Road	W	46–6	Robertson (2), Batchelor, Feldt, Lomax, Paasi, Walmsley, Welsby, Bennison	Percival (5/9)	7,723	Sky Sports +	3rd	
1 March; 14:30	Round 3	Wakefield Trinity	A	Belle Vue	W	26–6	Welsby, Robertson, Clark, Feldt	Percival (4/4 + 1 pen.)	7,604	BBC One; Sky Sports +	3rd	
7 March; 20:00	Round 4	Hull Kingston Rovers	H	Totally Wicked Stadium	L	10–20	Sironen, Welsby	Percival (1/2)	11,438	Sky Sports Action	3rd	
21 March; 20:00	Round 5	Warrington Wolves	H	Totally Wicked Stadium	L	12–14	Knowles, Sambou	Percival (2/2)	14,068	Sky Sports Main Event	3rd	
29 March; 17:30 (BST)	Round 6	Catalans Dragons	A	Stade Gilbert Brutus	W	13–14	Sailor (2)	Percival (2/2); Drop-goals Lomax (2)	9,386	Sky Sports +	3rd	
11 April; 20:00	Round 7	Wakefield Trinity	H	Totally Wicked Stadium	W	26–14	Whitley (2), Knowles, Robertson	Whitby (5/5)	10,108	Sky Sports +	4th	
18 April, 15:00 (Good Friday)	Round 8 (Rivals Round)	Wigan Warriors	A	Brick Community Stadium	L	14–24	Murphy, Paasi	Whitby (2/2 + 1 pen.)	24,294	Sky Sports Main Event	4th	
24 April, 20:00	Round 9	Warrington Wolves	A	Halliwell Jones Stadium	L	18–32	Bennison (2), Percival (2)	Whitby (1/4)	10,214	Sky Sports Action	5th	
3 May; 19:30	Round 10 (Magic Weekend)	Leeds Rhinos	N	St James' Park	L	4–17	Whitley	Whitby (0/1)	31,294 (Note: Attendance recorded across three fixtures.)	Sky Sports Action	5th	
15 May; 20:00	Round 11	Catalans Dragons	H	Totally Wicked Stadium	W	40–0	Whitby (3), Walmsley, Cross, Sailor, Murphy	Whitby (6/7)	10,337	Sky Sports Action	4th	
23 May; 20:00	Round 12	Huddersfield Giants	A	Kirklees Stadium	W	46–4	Welsby (3), Sailor (2), Sironen (2), Murphy	Whitby (7/8)	4,029	Sky Sports +	6th	
30 May; 20:00	Round 13	Hull Kingston Rovers	A	Craven Park	L	4–34	Murphy	Whitby (0/1)	11,087	Sky Sports Action	5th	
15 June; 15:00	Round 14	Salford Red Devils	A	Salford Community Stadium	W	46–4	Feldt (4), Robertson (2), Sironen, Walmsley, Dagnall	Whitby (2/4), Feldt (3/5)		Sky Sports +	6th	
20 June; 20:00	Round 15	Leeds Rhinos	H	Totally Wicked Stadium	W	18–4	Cross, Dagnall, Sailor	Feldt (3/3)	11,179	Sky Sports +	5th	
29 June; 15:00	Round 16	Salford Red Devils	H	Totally Wicked Stadium	W	58–0	Feldt (3), Dagnall (2), Sailor (2), Burns (2), Knowles, Clark	Lomax (7/11)	10,192	Sky Sports +	5th	
5 July; 15:00	Round 17	Hull F.C.	A	MKM Stadium	W	13–6	Feldt (2)	Lomax (2/2); Drop-goals Lomax	11,355	Sky Sports +	4th	
11 July; 20:00	Round 18	Leeds Rhinos	A	Headingley Rugby Stadium	W	6–0	Dagnall	Lomax (1/1)	15,093	Sky Sports Main Event	3rd	
17 July; 20:00	Round 19	Leigh Leopards	H	Totally Wicked Stadium	L	4–16	Robertson	Feldt (0/1)	11,805	Sky Sports Action	4th	
1 August; 20:00	Round 20	Castleford Tigers	H	Totally Wicked Stadium	W	40–0	Dagnall (2), Percival, Feldt, Clark, Robertson, Sailor	Feldt (6/7)	9,824	Sky Sports +	5th	
8 August; 20:00	Round 21	Wakefield Trinity	A	Belle Vue	W	34–4	Feldt (2), Walmsley, Knowles, Clark, Robertson	Feldt (5/6)	7,684	Sky Sports +	5th	
17 August; 14:30	Round 22	Huddersfield Giants	H	Totally Wicked Stadium	W	52–4	Percival (2), Feldt (2), Sailor (2), Dagnall, Lomax, Knowles	Feldt (8/9)	9,826	BBC Two; Sky Sports +	3rd	
22 August; 20:00	Round 23	Hull F.C.	H	Totally Wicked Stadium	W	16–10	Knowles, Mbye	Feldt (2/2 + 2 pen.)	12,005	Sky Sports Action	2nd	
29 August; 20:00	Round 24	Hull Kingston Rovers	A	Craven Park	L	8–12	Cross	Percival (1/1 + 2 pen.)	12,169	Sky Sports Action	4th	
5 September; 20:00	Round 25	Wigan Warriors	H	Totally Wicked Stadium	L	4–18	Cross	Feldt (0/1)	17,980	Sky Sports Action	5th	
12 September; 20:00	Round 26	Leigh Leopards	A	Leigh Sports Village	L	10–28	Feldt, Robertson	Percival (1/2)	10,011	Sky Sports Action	5th	
19 September; 20:00	Round 27	Castleford Tigers	H	Totally Wicked Stadium	W	26–24	Feldt (2), Stephens, Bell, Bennison	Feldt (3/4), Bennison (0/1)	10,058	Sky Sports Action	5th	

=== Table ===
Pos	Team	Pld	W	D	L	PF	PA	PD	Pts	Qualification
1	Hull Kingston Rovers (L, C)	27	22	0	5	786	292	+494	44	Advance to Semi-finals
2	Wigan Warriors	27	21	0	6	794	333	+461	42	Advance to Semi-finals
3	Leigh Leopards	27	19	1	7	619	452	+167	39	Advance to Eliminators
4	Leeds Rhinos	27	18	0	9	610	310	+300	36	Advance to Eliminators
5	St Helens	27	17	0	10	677	314	+363	34	Advance to Eliminators
6	Wakefield Trinity (Note: Salford forfeited their game against Wakefield. Under RFL operational rules, the game is recorded as a 48–0 victory for Wakefield, and converse loss for Salford, with the points scored and conceded applying to both teams.)	27	15	0	12	688	458	+230	30	Advance to Eliminators
7	Hull FC	27	13	1	13	539	461	+78	27	
8	Warrington Wolves	27	10	0	17	480	641	−161	20	
9	Catalans Dragons	27	10	0	17	425	652	−227	20	
10	Huddersfield Giants	27	7	0	20	347	738	−391	14	
11	Castleford Tigers	27	6	0	21	396	815	−419	12	
12	Salford Red Devils (R)	27	3	0	24	234	1129	−895	4 (Note: On 22 September 2025, Salford Red Devils were deducted two points breaching "a number of RFL operational rules" surrounding their team selection for their Round 1 fixture against St Helens on 15 February 2025.)	Relegated to Championship

(C) Champions; (L) League Leaders' Shield Winners; (R) Relegated

=== Play-offs ===
Date and time	Round	Versus	H/A	Venue	Result	Score	Tries	Goals	Attendance	TV	Report
27 September; 20:00	Eliminators	Leeds Rhinos	A	Headingley Rugby Stadium	W	16–14	Lomax, Bennison, Wright	Percival (1/1), Bennison (1/2)	11,108	Sky Sports Action	
27 September; 17:30	Semi-final	Hull Kingston Rovers	A	Craven Park	L	12–20	Cross, Robertson	Lomax (2/2)		BBC Two; Sky Sports Action	

== Challenge Cup ==
On 25 June 2024, the RFL announced a change to the Challenge Cup format, totalling 7 rounds compared to the previous 9, with Super League teams entering to play away from home at round 3.

St Helens were first drawn on 14 January to play West Hull A.R.L.F.C. away in Round 3 following West Hull's Round 2 24–18 victory against Hunslet A.R.L.F.C. on 25 January. The fixture was originally set to be played at West Hull's Johnny Whiteley Park in Gipsyville, however after the venue was ruled out due to having an unsuitable pitch, the fixture was moved to Hull Kingston Rovers' Craven Park stadium on the other side of the city.

Following their victory against West Hull, St Helens beat the Leeds Rhinos 22–14 at home on 14 March, qualifying them for the quarter-finals against the Warrington Wolves. St Helens were ultimately knocked out of the 2025 Challenge Cup by Warrington during the quarter-final fixture.

Date and time	Round	Versus	H/A	Venue	Result	Score	Tries	Goals	Attendance	TV	Report
8 February; 14:15 (Note: Kick-off delayed by fifteen minutes due to Craven Park officials having to open gates and allow free admission to numerous fans wanting to buy tickets.)	Round 3	West Hull A.R.L.F.C.	A	Craven Park	W	38–0	Bennison (2), Whitby, Robertson, Whitley, Sailor, Murphy	Whitby (5/7)	5,000+	Not televised	
14 March; 20:00	Round 4	Leeds Rhinos	H	Totally Wicked Stadium	W	22–14	Feldt, Sailor, Whitley, Robertson	Percival (3/4)	7,531	The Sportsman	
6 April; 14:30	Quarter-finals	Warrington Wolves	A	Halliwell Jones Stadium	L	12–20	Sailor, Clark	Bennison (2/2)	10,114	BBC Two	

== Transfers ==
=== Gains ===
Player	Club	Contract	Date
(Australia) Tristan Sailor	Brisbane Broncos	2 Years	August 2024
(Australia) Kyle Feldt	North Queensland Cowboys	2 Years	August 2024
(England) Lewis Murphy	Sydney Roosters	2 Years	September 2024
(England) Deon Cross	Salford Red Devils	2 1/2 Years	April 2025

==== Loans in ====
Player	Club	Loan period	Date
(Australia) Shane Wright	Salford Red Devils	End of season	August 2025

=== Losses ===
Player	Club	Contract	Date
(England) Lewis Dodd	South Sydney Rabbitohs	3 Years	May 2024
(England) Tommy Makinson	Catalans Dragons	2 Years	June 2024
(England) Sam Royle	TBC		October 2024
(England) Ben Lane	TBC		October 2024
(Samoa) Sione Mata'utia	N/A	Retirement	November 2024
(Fiji) Waqa Blake	Bradford Bulls	2 Years	November 2024
(England) McKenzie Buckley	Widnes Vikings	1 Year (Note: Buckley was released from his contract after three weeks to take time away from rugby league.)	November 2024
(England) Ben Davies	Oldham R.L.F.C.	1 Year	May 2025
(Tonga) Konrad Hurrell	FC Lézignan XIII	End of Super XIII season	September 2025

==== Loans out ====
Player	Club	Loan period	Date
(England) Ben Davies	Castleford Tigers	Two weeks (Note: Recalled from loan ahead of fixture against Castleford.)	February 2025
(Thailand) Tee Ritson	Barrow Raiders	End of season	February 2025
(England) Jonny Vaughan	Salford Red Devils	End of season	March 2025
(England) Leon Cowen	Swinton Lions	End of season	June 2025
(England) Will Roberts	Widnes Vikings	End of season (Note: Initially signed on a two week loan in June.)	August 2025
(England) Dayon Sambou	Halifax R.L.F.C.	Two months	July 2025
(England) George Whitby	Halifax R.L.F.C.	Two months	July 2025
(England) Jake Davies	Salford Red Devils	Two weeks	August 2025
(England) Ciaran Nolan	Salford Red Devils	Two weeks	August 2025

== Squad ==
2025 St Helens R.F.C. Squad
First team squad			Coaching staff
1 (England) Jack Welsby (vc) – FB; 2 (Australia) Kyle Feldt – WG; 4 (England) Mark Percival – CE; 5 (England) Jon Bennison – WG, FB; 6 (Australia) Tristan Sailor – SO, FB, WG; 7 (England) Jonny Lomax (c) – SH; 8 (England) Alex Walmsley – PR; 9 (England) Daryl Clark – HK, LF; 10 (England) Matty Lees – PR; 11 (Australia) Curtis Sironen – SR; 12 (England) Joe Batchelor – SR; 13 (England) Morgan Knowles (vc) – LF, PR, HK; 14 (Australia) Moses Mbye – HK, SH, FB, CE	15 (Scotland) James Bell – LF, SR; 16 (England) Matt Whitley – SR, CE; 17 (Tonga) Agnatius Paasi – PR; 18 (England) Jake Wingfield – LF, PR; 19 (England) George Delaney – PR; 20 (England) Lewis Murphy – WG; 21 (England) Noah Stephens – PR; 23 (England) Jake Burns – HK; 24 (England) Jonny Vaughan – CE, SR; 26 (England) Harry Robertson – CE, FB, SO; 27 (England) George Whitby – SH, SO; 28 (England) Will Roberts – SO, SH	29 (England) Dayon Sambou – CE, WG; 30 (England) Owen Dagnall – WG, CE; 31 (England) Leon Cowen – LF, SR; 32 (England) Ciaran Nolan – HK, SO; 33 (England) Alfie Sinclair – PR; 34 (England) Jake Davies – SR, LF; 35 (England) Cole Marsh – LF, HK; 36 (England) Deon Cross – WG, CE; 37 (Australia) Shane Wright – SR, LF	Head coach: (England) Paul Wellens; Assistant coaches: (Wales) Lee Briers; (Ireland) Eamon O'Carroll; Legend: (c) Captain(s); (vc) Vice-captain(s); (red card) = suspended; = injured; (gk) = Goal kicker; Updated: 4 October 2025; Source(s): Saints 2025 squad numbers confirmed
