= 2025 Super League season =

30th season of Super League rugby

- League: Super League
- Duration: 27 rounds
- Teams: 12
- Matches played: 166
- Points scored: 6,747
- Highest attendance: 45,209; Wigan Warriors vs Warrington Wolves (1 March)
- Lowest attendance: 2,051; Salford Red Devils vs Castleford Tigers (13 July)
- Average attendance: 10,229
- Total attendance: 1,698,022
- Broadcast partners: Sky Sports; BBC Sport; SuperLeague+; Fox League; Fox Soccer Plus; Sport Klub; beIN Sports

2025 Season
- Champions: Hull Kingston Rovers (1st Super League title 6th British title)
- League Leaders Shield: Hull Kingston Rovers
- Runners-up: Wigan Warriors
- Biggest home win: St Helens 82–0 Salford Red Devils (15 February)
- Biggest away win: Salford Red Devils 12–74 Hull KR (31 July)
- Man of Steel: (England) Jake Connor (Leeds Rhinos)
- Top point-scorer: (France) Arthur Mourgue (200)
- Top try-scorer: (England) Lewis Martin (25)

Grading
- Elevated: Bradford Bulls; Toulouse Olympique; York Knights
- Demoted: Salford Red Devils

The 2025 Super League season, known as the 2025 Betfred Super League for sponsorship reasons, was the 30th season of the Super League and 131st season of rugby league in Great Britain.

Wigan Warriors were the defending champions, having beaten Hull KR in the Grand Final, to win their seventh Super League title.

The 2025 Super League broke the record for the highest attended season (for seasons with 12 teams) with over 1.62 million fans attending games across the regular season. This beat the previous record set in 2008, and was also the first Super League season where average game attendance was over 10,000. Further television viewing figures had risen by 52%.

The Grand Final was won by Hull KR who beat Wigan Warriors 24-6 in a repeat of the previous years Grand Final. Hull KR became the first new team in 21 years to win Super League and won their first league title since 1985.

== Rule changes ==
=== Captain's Challenge ===
In December 2024, the Rugby Football League (RFL) announced the introduction of the Captain's Challenge, first introduced to the National Rugby League in Australia in 2020 and also used during the 2021 Rugby League World Cup, for all Super League and Challenge Cup matches from 2025 onwards. Teams are permitted a ten-second window to contest a referee's decisions at a stoppage in play and refer to the video referee for a second opinion, with each team permitted to have one unsuccessful challenge per match. Captain's Challenges are not permitted for forward passes, roll balls, certain penalties, time-wasting, dissent and scrum penalties.

=== Disciplinary system ===
In January 2025, the RFL announced a change to the Super League's disciplinary system for the 2025 season onwards. Incidents charged from Grades A through to C by the RFL's Match Review Panel, will now be graded in a points system; the lowest, Grade A, will result in one penalty point being charged against a player, followed by Grade B (3 points), and Grades C (5 points). Should a player be charged with a Grade D, then they will receive 12 points, and a 2 match suspension. Grade E, will see players automatically referred to an RFL tribunal, which is a minimum 6 match suspension. When issued, these penalty points will stay on a player's record for one year.

The amount of penalty points accumulated by a player will determine how long a match ban they may receive: for example, a player with 6 to 11 penalty points will receive a one-match ban, while a player with 54 or more points will receive a 12-match ban.

=== Drop-outs ===
Two variants of drop-outs were introduced for 2025:

- If a team kicks a drop-out on the full over the touchline or kicks a drop-out so that it fails to travel at least 10 metres forward into the field of play, a play-the-ball 10 metres out will follow from the centre of the goal line rather than a penalty kick from the centre of the 10-metre line.
- If a team takes a 20-metre drop-out and it travels on the full over the touchline or kicks a 20 metre drop-out so that it fails to travel at least 10 metres forward in the field of play, a play-the-ball from the centre of the 20-metre line will follow, rather than a penalty kick from the centre of the 20-metre line.

=== Tackle height ===
Changes to tackle height rules were first announced by the RFL for all leagues in December 2023, with tackling above the armpit outlawed in order to reduce rates of head concussion injuries during matches. Though the rule was introduced to grassroots, academy and reserve rugby leagues in 2024, elite rugby leagues were to see this rule implemented in their 2025 seasons, however in December 2024, the RFL announced that tackle height laws would remain the same after concussion injuries were found to have been reduced with the introduction of instrumented mouthguards.

=== Other rules ===
Green cards, first introduced in 2022 to permit defending players to leave the pitch for a maximum two minutes, were permitted to also be used by the referee to allow attacking players to leave the pitch.

Referees are also permitted to differentiate between active and passive offside players at a kick chase.

== Structure changes ==
=== Grading ===
Gradings were introduced to the Super League by IMG and the RFL from 2024 onwards, removing automatic relegation as a result of finishing 12th from 2024 onwards. After a proposal to reintroduce automatic promotion from lower leagues irrespective of grading was rejected, changes for the 2025 season largely centred on factors as to how teams are graded at the end of the season.

Clubs can now earn grading points based on how often their matches are aired or streamed on any platform, with the six clubs scoring the highest match viewership from these platforms securing 1.0 points; clubs who qualify with a minimum six-camera match production score 0.75 points, while clubs who do not have matches broadcast on any platform scored 0.5 points. Additional points can be secured by expanding their social media footprint, as well as through expanding their supporter catchment by signing a Rugby League Development Agreement with a bordering local authority. Clubs whose stadiums are undergoing major renovation work have been allowed to retain their previous stadium facilities score for a maximum of two years, while clubs who do not publish their data capture scores will be penalised 0.25 points.

=== International break ===
After 2024's mid-season away match against the France national rugby league team held on 29 June was criticised for poor attendance, a lack of advertising and placement in the middle of a triple-header of matches, the England national rugby league team announced that they did not plan to play matches in June and July 2025, therefore removing the Super League's international break for the 2025 season. When the Super League's 2025 fixtures were announced, Round 20 was split across two weeks between 24 July and 1 August to compensate for the international break. Six teams - Catalans, Hull FC, Huddersfield, Leeds Wakefield, Wigan - played Super League matches in the first week, while the remaining six - Castleford, Hull KR, Leigh, Salford, St Helens and Warrington - played in the second week, allowing each team to rest their players for one week regardless of whether they progressed into the Challenge Cup final.

== Broadcasting ==
BBC Sport broadcast matches as well as match highlights in the second year of their three-year deal with the Super League, replacing Channel 4 as the league's free-to-air partner from 2024 season. Ten games per season will be shown live on television, with a further five shown on iPlayer, the BBC's streaming platform.

== Teams ==
The league comprises 12 teams. The regular season comprises 27 rounds.

Wigan Warriors are the defending champions after winning the 2024 Grand Final. London Broncos, who finished bottom of the Super League table in 2024, were relegated to the Championship under IMG's grading system. They were replaced by Wakefield Trinity, who were promoted from the Championship under the grading system after finishing top of the Championship table.

Team	2024 position	Grading	Stadium	Capacity	City/Town
Castleford Tigers	10th	A	Wheldon Road	12,000	Castleford, West Yorkshire
Catalans Dragons	7th	A	Stade Gilbert Brutus	13,000	Perpignan, Pyrénées-Orientales, France
Huddersfield Giants	9th	B	Kirklees Stadium	24,121	Huddersfield, West Yorkshire
Hull FC	11th	B	MKM Stadium	25,400	Kingston upon Hull, East Riding of Yorkshire
Hull Kingston Rovers	2nd (Grand Final runners up)	A	Craven Park	11,000	Kingston upon Hull, East Riding of Yorkshire
Leeds Rhinos	8th	A	Headingley Rugby Stadium	21,062	Leeds, West Yorkshire
Leigh Leopards	5th (Eliminated in SF)	A	Leigh Sports Village	12,000	Leigh, Greater Manchester
Salford Red Devils	4th (Eliminated in Elim final)	B	Salford Community Stadium	12,000	Salford, Greater Manchester
St Helens	6th (Eliminated in Elim final)	A	Totally Wicked Stadium	18,000	St Helens, Merseyside
Wakefield Trinity	1st in Championship (Promoted)	A	Belle Vue	9,333	Wakefield, West Yorkshire
Warrington Wolves	3rd (Eliminated in SF)	A	Halliwell Jones Stadium	15,200	Warrington, Cheshire
Wigan Warriors	1st (Champions)	A	Brick Community Stadium	25,133	Wigan, Greater Manchester

Legend
Reigning Champions
Previous season Runners-Up
Previous season League Leaders
Promoted

Locations of the 2025 Super League teams in North West England
Locations of the 2025 Super League teams in Yorkshire and the Humber
Locations of 2025 Super League teams in France

== Fixtures and results ==
=== Matches decided by golden point ===
If a match ends in a draw after 80 minutes, then a further 10 minutes of golden point extra time is played, to determine a winner (five minutes each way). The first team to score either a try, penalty goal or drop goal during this period, will win the match. However, if there are no further scores during the additional 10 minutes period, then the match will end in a draw.

==== Game 1: Wigan Warriors v Leigh Leopards ====
The Round 1 fixture between Wigan Warriors and Leigh Leopards at the Brick Community Stadium on 13 February ended in a 0–0 draw, the first time a match has ended with no scoring in Super League history. Wigan's Jai Field did score a try in the second half, however it was disallowed for a ball steal in the build-up. The game then went to golden point, and Gareth O'Brien kicked the winning drop goal for Leigh, defeating Wigan away for the first time since 1983.

==== Game 2: Hull KR v Castleford Tigers ====
The Round 1 fixture between Hull Kingston Rovers and Castleford Tigers, at Sewell Group Craven Park on 14 February finished 18–18 after 80 minutes, however, Tex Hoy missed a last minute penalty to potentially win the game for Castleford, and the game went to extra time. Mikey Lewis kicked the winning drop goal to win the game for Hull KR 19-18.

==== Game 3: Hull FC v Leigh Leopards ====
The Round 4 fixture between Hull FC and Leigh Leopards on 6 March 2025, finished 22–22 after 80 minutes. The game then went to extra time. The first drop goal attempt came from Lachlan Lam at the end of the first period, but his effort was short, and with no further scores, the score remained the same. The second period of extra time saw Jordan Rapana's drop goal attempt charged down, and at the end of the second period, Lam attempted another drop goal, but his effort was charged down also, and with no further points scored, the match ended in a draw.

==== Game 4: Catalans Dragons v Wakefield Trinity ====
The Round 9 fixture between Catalans Dragons and Wakefield Trinity on 26 April 2025, finished 20–20 after 80 minutes. The game then went to extra time, which saw Mason Lino sent to the sin bin for a high tackle, and from the resulting penalty, Reimis Smith scored the winning try, to win the game for Catalans 24–20

=== Cancellations ===
During the season, Salford have been hampered by financial difficulties, which has resulted in numerous players leaving the club. In the round 21 fixture against Hull, Salford only managed to raise a 17-player squad which included the use of loan players from other Super League teams and were thrashed 80–6 by Hull. The following week, Salford were due to play Wakefield, but with the other clubs now reluctant to loan players, Salford could only name a squad including only two players with Super League experience. Citing player welfare as the issue, Salford therefore withdrew from the round 22 fixture against Wakefield. The match was awarded to Wakefield as 48–0 victory as covered in the operational rules.

== Table ==
Pos	Team	Pld	W	D	L	PF	PA	PD	Pts	Qualification
1	Hull Kingston Rovers (L, C)	27	22	0	5	786	292	+494	44	Advance to Semi-finals
2	Wigan Warriors	27	21	0	6	794	333	+461	42	Advance to Semi-finals
3	Leigh Leopards	27	19	1	7	619	452	+167	39	Advance to Eliminators
4	Leeds Rhinos	27	18	0	9	610	310	+300	36	Advance to Eliminators
5	St Helens	27	17	0	10	677	314	+363	34	Advance to Eliminators
6	Wakefield Trinity (Note: Salford forfeited their game against Wakefield. Under RFL operational rules, the game is recorded as a 48–0 victory for Wakefield, and converse loss for Salford, with the points scored and conceded applying to both teams.)	27	15	0	12	688	458	+230	30	Advance to Eliminators
7	Hull FC	27	13	1	13	539	461	+78	27	
8	Warrington Wolves	27	10	0	17	480	641	−161	20	
9	Catalans Dragons	27	10	0	17	425	652	−227	20	
10	Huddersfield Giants	27	7	0	20	347	738	−391	14	
11	Castleford Tigers	27	6	0	21	396	815	−419	12	
12	Salford Red Devils (R)	27	3	0	24	234	1129	−895	4 (Note: On 22 September 2025, Salford Red Devils were deducted two points breaching "a number of RFL operational rules" surrounding their team selection for their Round 1 fixture against St Helens on 15 February 2025.)	Relegated to Championship

(C) Champions; (L) League Leaders' Shield Winners; (R) Relegated

== Play-offs ==
=== Team bracket ===
Eliminators
3	Leigh	26
6	Wakefield	10
4	Leeds	14
5	St Helens	16

Semi-finals
1	Hull KR	20
5	St Helens	12
2	Wigan	18
3	Leigh	6

Grand Final
1	Hull KR	24
2	Wigan	6

=== Week 1: Eliminators ===
26 September 2025
20:00 BST (UTC+01)

Leigh Leopards	26–10	Wakefield Trinity
Tries: Brand (11'); Liu (24'); Charnley (29'); Tuitavake (62'); Goals: O'Brien (13', 25', 30', 46' (pen), 64')	1st: 18–0; 2nd: 8–10; Report	Tries: Myers (44'); Scott (71'); Goals: Lino (71')

Leigh Sports Village
Attendance: 10,011
Referee: Liam Moore
Touch judges: Ryan Cox
John Roberts
Player of the Match: Isaac Liu (Leigh Leopards)

Team details
Leigh Leopards		Position	Wakefield Trinity
Name	Number	Position	Number	Name
Bailey Hodgson	24	FB	23	Josh Rourke
Keanan Brand	18	WG	30	Jayden Myers
Tesi Niu	3	CE	3	Cameron Scott
Umyla Hanley	4	CE	19	Ollie Pratt
Josh Charnley	5	WG	5	Tom Johnstone
Gareth O'Brien	6	SO	6	Jake Trueman
Lachlan Lam	7	SH	20	Mason Lino
Joe Ofahengaue	32	PR	8	Mike McMeeken
Edwin Ipape	9	HK	9	Liam Hood
Robbie Mulhern	10	PF	31	Caius Faatili
Frankie Halton	11	SR	17	Matthew Storton
Owen Trout	8	SR	12	Josh Griffin
Isaac Liu	13	LF	13	Jay Pitts
Jack Hughes	12	IN	10	Ky Rodwell
Alec Tuitavake	15	IN	11	Seth Nikotemo
Matt Davis	16	IN	16	Renouf Atoni
Brad Dwyer	17	IN	28	Harvey Smith
Adrian Lam		Coach		Daryl Powell

27 September 2025
20:00 BST (UTC+01)

Leeds Rhinos	14–16	St Helens
Tries: Hankinson (11'); McDonnell (27'); Goals: Connor (13', 29', 65' (pen),	1st: 12–6; 2nd: 2–10; Report	Tries: Lomax (23'); Bennison (75'); Wright (80'); Goals: Percival (24'); Bennison (75')

AMT Headingley Stadium
Attendance: 11,108
Referee: Jack Smith

Team details
Leeds Rhinos		Position	St Helens
Name	Number	Position	Number	Name
Lachie Miller	1	FB	6	Tristan Sailor
Ryan Hall	5	WG	5	Jon Bennison
Harry Newman	3	CE	26	Harry Robertson
Ash Handley	4	CE	4	Mark Percival
Chris Hankinson	31	WG	36	Deon Cross
Brodie Croft	6	SO	1	Jack Welsby
Jake Connor	18	SH	7	Jonny Lomax
Mikolaj Oledzki	8	PR	8	Alex Walmsley
Jarrod O'Connor	14	HK	9	Daryl Clark
Keenan Palasia	10	PF	10	Matty Lees
James McDonnell	12	SR	11	Curtis Sironen
Morgan Gannon	16	SR	16	Matt Whitley
Kallum Watkins	28	LF	13	Morgan Knowles
James Bentley	11	IN	14	Moses Mbye
Sam Lisone	15	IN	15	James Bell
Cooper Jenkins	17	IN	19	George Delaney
Tom Holroyd	19	IN	36	Shane Wright
Brad Arthur		Coach		Paul Wellens

The game saw a controversial St Helens try awarded by the video referee Chris Kendall after an initial call of no try. The try resulted in St Helens advancing and Leeds Rhinos being knocked out. The RFL later stated that the try should not have stood and apologised to Leeds for resultant outcome.

=== Week 2: Semi-finals ===
A controversy occurred ahead of the first semi-final after Leigh Leopards owner Derek Beaumont informed Wigan Warriors of his intent to boycott the fixture following "unacceptable" ticket allocation for his team's travelling support. This was in spite of Wigan's ticket allocation to Leigh being over double the minimum 10% of ground capacity required by the RFL at 5,400 in a 25,000 capacity stadium. Wigan stated that their allocation was the maximum they could give under the rules of the independent Safety Advisory Group and the club's Ground Safety Officer in addition to a police consultation.

Beaumont alleged that Wigan's statement on the issue was factually incorrect and an intentional attack on character, in addition to accusing Wigan of sharing private WhatsApp messages between the two clubs' CEOs and passing them off as formal correspondence. He further stated that threats to boycott the game came after Wigan cancelled a number of Leigh fans' tickets that were bought in the home stands and that the further ticket allocation was for these fans' safety to ensure these fans were segregated. This was in spite of him downplaying Wigan's safety concerns by citing the absence of safety issues between the two sides in previous games of the season. Beaumont claimed there was an agreement in place for Leigh to have a block in the East and West stands allocated to them if Leigh sold out the North Stand, and claimed he received no reasonable explanation as to why this was no longer the case. He further cited his side's deservace of extra allocation due to Wigan's allocation still being on sale and their previous season's semi-finals not selling out. He also stated his club was preparing for the semi-final as normal.

3 October 2025
20:00 BST (UTC+01)

Wigan Warriors	18–6	Leigh Leopards
Tries: French (14') (40'); Walters (81'); Goals: Keighran (16') (39') (pen) (40')	1st: 14–6; 2nd: 4–0; Report	Tries: Mulhern (27'); Goals: O'Brien (29')

Brick Community Stadium
Attendance: 18,523
Referee: Chris Kendall

Team details
Wigan Warriors		Position	TBC
Name	Number	Position	Number	Name
	1	FB	1
	2	WG	2
	3	CE	3
	4	CE	4
	5	WG	5
	6	SO	6
	7	SH	7
	8	PR	8
	9	HK	9
	10	PF	10
	11	SR	11
	12	SR	12
	13	LF	13
		IN
		IN
		IN
		IN
Matt Peet		Coach		Adrian Lam

On the Monday following the tie, Leigh Leopards made an official complaint to the RFL over the aforementioned build up and Wigan's stewarding before and during the game.

4 October 2025
17:30 BST (UTC+01)

Hull KR	20–12	St Helens
Tries: Lewis (17'); Burgess (24'); Gildart (63') (71'); Goals: Mourgue (14') (pen) (19')	1st: 12-0; 2nd: 8-12; Report	Tries: Cross (44'); Robertson (75'); Goals: Lomax (45') (75')

Craven Park
Attendance: 12,235
Referee: Liam Moore

Team details
Hull KR		Position	St Helens
Name	Number	Position	Number	Name
	1	FB	1
	2	WG	2
	3	CE	3
	4	CE	4
	5	WG	5
	6	SO	6
	7	SH	7
	8	PR	8
	9	HK	9
	10	PF	10
	11	SR	11
	12	SR	12
	13	LF	13
		IN
		IN
		IN
		IN
Willie Peters		Coach

=== Week 3: Grand Final ===
Saturday 11 October 2025
18:00 BST (UTC+01)

Hull KR	24–6	Wigan Warriors
Tries: Lewis 20'; Burgess 27', 79'; Litten 62'; Goals: Mourgue 21'; Martin pen 53', 60', 80' (3/4)	report	Tries: Smith 49'; Goals: Keighran pen 39' (1/2)

Old Trafford, Manchester
Attendance: 68,853
Referee: Liam Moore
Touch judges: Marcus Griffiths and Richard Thompson
Video referee: Jack Smith
Rob Burrow Award: Mikey Lewis (Hull KR)

== End-of-season awards ==
The end of season awards took place on Tuesday 7 October. Jake Connor was announced as the Man of Steel, whilst Hull KR coach Willie Peters was named as coach of the year, for the second successive season.

- Man of Steel: (England) Jake Connor
- Coach of the Year: (Australia) Willie Peters
- Young Player of the Year: (England) Harry Robertson
- Top tackler: (England) Jarrod O'Connor: (1,047 tackles)
- Top try scorer: (England) Lewis Martin: (25 tries)
- Top meters: (Australia) Lachlan Miller (4,108 meters)

== Player statistics ==
=== Top try scorers ===
Rank	Player	Club	Tries
1	(England) Lewis Martin	Hull FC	25
2	(Australia) Jai Field	Wigan Warriors	24
3	(England) Mikey Lewis	Hull KR	19
4	(England) Joe Burgess	Hull KR	18
5	(Australia) Kyle Feldt	St Helens	17
6	(England) Tom Davies	Hull KR	16
7	(England) Keanan Brand	Leigh Leopards	15
7	(Australia) Tristan Sailor	St Helens	15
9	(England) Jake Wardle	Wigan Warriors	14
10	(England) Liam Marshall	Wigan Warriors	13

=== Top goal scorers ===
Rank	Player	Club	Goals	Missed Goals	Drop Goals	Goal Percentage %
1	(Australia) Adam Keighran	Wigan Warriors	32	9	0	78%
2	(France) Arthur Mourgue	Hull KR	28	7	0	80%
3	(England) Mark Percival	St Helens	26	11	0	70%
4	(England) Max Jowitt	Wakefield Trinity	25	6	0	80%
5	(England) Gareth O'Brien	Leigh Leopards	21	9	1	70%
6	(France) Guillermo Aispuro-Bichet	Catalans Dragons	20	4	0	84%
7	(Australia) Aidan Sezer	Hull FC	18	9	1	66%
8	(England) Harry Smith	Wigan Warriors	16	7	0	70%
9	(England) Rowan Milnes	Castleford Tigers	15	7	0	68%
9	(England) George Whitby	St Helens	15	6	0	71%

=== Top points scorers ===
Rank	Player	Club	Points
1	(France) Arthur Mourgue	Hull KR	72
1	(Australia) Adam Keighran	Wigan Warriors	72
3	(England) Max Jowitt	Wakefield Trinity	70
4	(England) Mikey Lewis	Hull KR	52
5	(Australia) Jai Field	Wigan Warriors	48
7	(France) Guillermo Aispuro-Bichet	Catalans Dragons	44
8	(England) Gareth O'Brien	Leigh Leopards	42
9	(Australia) Aiden Sezer	Hull FC	41
10	(England) Harry Smith	Wigan Warriors	40

As of 18 May 2025 (Round 11)

== Discipline ==
=== (red card) Red cards ===
Rank	Player	Club	Red cards
1	(France) Benjamin Garcia	Catalans Dragons	1
1	(Australia) Cade Cust	Hull FC	1
1	(England) Liam Knight	Hull FC	1
1	(Samoa) Sauaso Sue	Hull Kingston Rovers	1
1	(England) Ash Handley	Leeds Rhinos	1

=== (yellow card) Yellow cards ===
Rank	Player	Club	Yellow cards
1	(England) George Lawler	Castleford Tigers	2
1	(Australia) Keenan Palasia	Leeds Rhinos	2
1	(Samoa) Mason Lino	Wakefield Trinity	2
2	(Papua New Guinea) Sylvester Namo	Castleford Tigers	1
2	(Ireland) Innes Senior	Castleford Tigers	1
2	(France) Jordan Dezaria	Catalans Dragons	1
2	(France) Romain Navarrete	Catalans Dragons	1
2	(England) Sam Tomkins	Catalans Dragons	1
2	(Australia) Luke Keary	Catalans Dragons	1
2	(England) Sam Hewitt	Huddersfield Giants	1
2	(England) Jack Ashworth	Hull FC	1
2	(Australia) John Asiata	Hull FC	1
2	(England) Amir Bourouh	Hull FC	1
2	(New Zealand) Jordan Rapana	Hull FC	1
2	(Australia) Aidan Sezer	Hull FC	1
2	(Australia) Liam Knight	Hull FC	1
2	(England) Michael McIlorum	Hull Kingston Rovers	1
2	(England) Jake Connor	Leeds Rhinos	1
2	(England) Mikołaj Olędzki	Leeds Rhinos	1
2	(England) Jack Sinfield	Leeds Rhinos	1
2	(England) Kallum Watkins	Leeds Rhinos	1
2	(England) Chris Hill	Salford Red Devils	1
2	(New Zealand) Jayden Nikorima	Salford Red Devils	1
2	(England) Joe Shorrocks	Salford Red Devils	1
2	(Australia) Moses Mbye	St Helens	1
2	(England) Liam Farrell	Wigan Warriors	1
2	(England) Tyler Dupree	Wigan Warriors	1
2	(Australia) Adam Keighran	Wigan Warriors	1
2	(England) Sam Walters	Wigan Warriors	1

== Attendances ==
=== Club attendances ===
Club	Home Games	Total	Average	Highest	Lowest
Castleford Tigers	6	38,757	6,460	7,723	5,469
Catalans Dragons	5	43,733	8,747	9,386	8,123
Huddersfield Giants	5	22,536	4,507	5,871	3,367
Hull FC	5	68,094	13,619	21,108	9,765
Hull KR	6	65,630	10,938	11,300	10,515
Leeds Rhinos	6	92,595	15,433	16,386	14,234
Leigh Leopards	5	44,503	8,901	10,375	8,011
Salford Red Devils	4	19,214	4,804	5,798	3,764
St Helens	5	58,169	11,634	14,068	10,108
Wakefield Trinity	7	56,002	8,000	9,245	6,629
Warrington Wolves	5	52,941	10,588	11,157	10,024
Wigan Warriors	5	95,378	19,076	24,294	14,262

=== Top 10 attendances ===
As of 18 May 2025 (Round 11)

Rank	Home team	Away team	Stadium	Attendance
1	Wigan Warriors	Warrington Wolves	Allegiant Stadium	45,209
2	Magic Weekend: Day 2		St James' Park	32,862
3	Magic Weekend: Day 1		St James' Park	31,294
4	Wigan Warriors	St Helens	Brick Community Stadium	24,294
5	Wigan Warriors	Leigh Leopards	Brick Community Stadium	21,748
6	Hull FC	Hull KR	MKM Stadium	21,018
7	Wigan Warriors	Huddersfield Giants	Brick Community Stadium	17,695
8	Wigan Warriors	Leigh Leopards	Brick Community Stadium	17,449
9	Leeds Rhinos	Hull KR	Headingley	16,863
10	Leeds Rhinos	Wigan Warriors	Headingley	15,966
