= George Whitby (rugby league) =

English rugby league footballer

Personal information
- Full name: George Whitby
- Born: 17 May 2006 (age 20) St Helens, Merseyside, England
- Height: 5 ft 11 in (1.80 m)
- Weight: 12 st 8 lb (80 kg)

Playing information
- Position: Scrum-half
Club
Years	Team	Pld	T	G	FG	P
2024–	St Helens	20	7	31	0	90
2025(DR)	→ Halifax Panthers	7	2	20	0	48
2026	→ Salford (loan)	1	1	5	0	14
	Total	28	10	56	0	152
- Source: As of 24 August 2026

George Whitby (born 17 May 2006) is a professional rugby league footballer who plays as a scrum-half for St Helens in the Super League.

== Background ==
Whitby played his junior rugby league for Blackbrook Royals.

== Club career ==
=== St Helens ===
In round 23 of the 2024 Super League season, Whitby made his club debut for St Helens in their 42-6 loss against Hull Kingston Rovers scoring Saints only try. On 6 February 2025, Whitby signed a four-year deal with St Helens keeping him at the club until the end of 2028. In round 11 of the 2025 Super League season, Whitby scored a hat-trick and kicked six goals in St Helens 40-0 victory over Catalans Dragons. On 13 August 2026, it was announced that Whitby would miss the remainder of the 2026 Super League season with an ACL injury.

=== Salford RLFC (loan) ===
On 21 May 2026 it was reported that he had signed for Salford RLFC in the RFL Championship on short-term loan
