= Tee Ritson =

Thai rugby league footballer

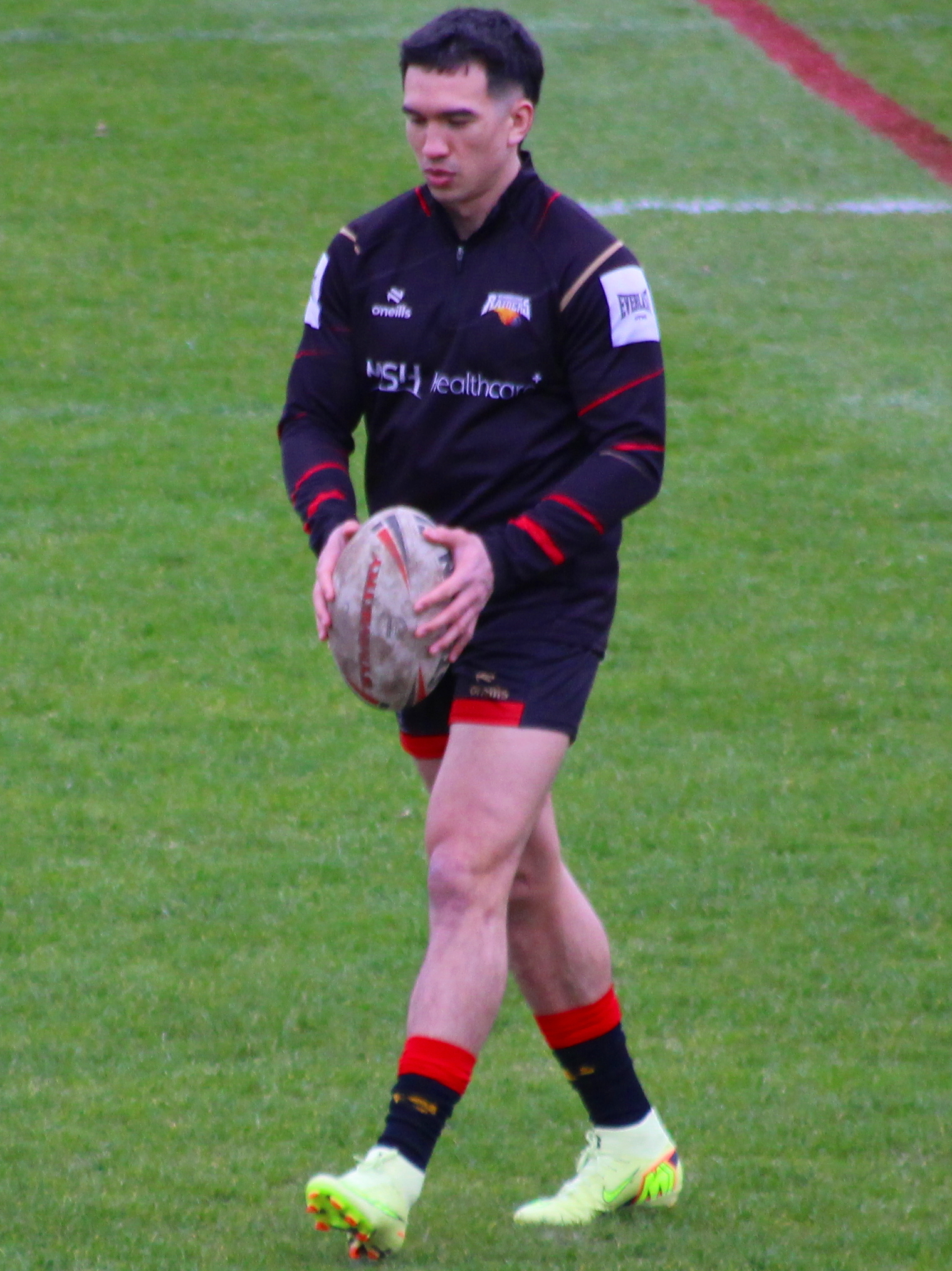

Personal information
- Full name: Theerapol Ritson
- Born: 7 January 1996 (age 30) Khon Kaen, Thailand

Playing information
- Position: Wing
Club
Years	Team	Pld	T	G	FG	P
2014–17	Workington Town	39	12	0	0	48
2018(loan)	→ Newcastle Thunder	22	18	0	0	72
2019–23	Barrow Raiders	71	70	3	0	286
2023(loan)	→ St Helens	16	3	0	0	12
2024–25	St Helens	10	1	0	0	4
2024(DR)	→ Swinton Lions	9	3	0	0	12
2025(loan)	→ Barrow Raiders	17	13	0	0	52
2026–	Barrow Raiders	17	15	0	0	60
	Total	201	135	3	0	546
Representative
Years	Team	Pld	T	G	FG	P
2022	Cumbria	1	1	0	0	4
- Source: As of 25 September 2026

Theerapol Ritson (born 7 January 1996) is a Thai semi-professional rugby league footballer who plays as a winger for Barrow Raiders in the RFL Championship

He previously played for St Helens, Workington Town, Newcastle Thunder and Barrow. Ritson has also appeared for the Swinton Lions in the RFL Championship, with St Helens having a dual-registration agreement in place at the time.

== Background ==
Ritson was born in Thailand, but was raised in Maryport, Cumbria, England.

== Playing career ==
=== Workington Town ===
His playing career started at Workington Town where he made 39 appearances between 2014 and 2017 scoring 12 tries.

In 2016 he was the club's player of the year and was selected for the Thailand national team. An international debut was missed as the game against Malta was cancelled due to the death of King Bhumibol Adulyadej.

=== Newcastle Thunder (loan) ===
At the start of the 2018 season Ritson moved to Newcastle Thunder on loan where he made 22 appearances scoring 18 tries.

=== Barrow Raiders ===
2019 saw a move to Barrow Raiders, where he became a prolific try scorer over the next four seasons, scoring 70 tries in just 73 appearances. In 2022 he scored 33 tries in 31 games becoming the Championship leading try scorer for the season.

=== Cumbria ===
At the end of the 2022 season Ritson made his representative debut as he was selected to play for Cumbria in a World Cup warm-up match against Jamaica. Cumbria won 28–2 with Ritson scoring one of the Cumbrian's tries.

=== St Helens ===
In November 2022, Super League side, St Helens, signed Ritson on a one-year loan deal, marking Ritson's move to professional rugby. Ritson's debut for St Helens was in the warm-up match for the 2023 World Club Challenge against St. George Illawarra Dragons where he also scored his first try for St Helens in a 30–12 victory. His Super League debut came in St Helens 2023 opening fixture against Castleford Tigers where he scored his first Super League try in St Helens 24–6 win. On 18 October 2023 it was reported that he had made his initial loan deal switch to St Helens permanent signing a two-year deal.

=== Barrow Raiders (return) ===
On 28 February 2025 he returned to Barrow in the RFL Championship on a short-term two-week loan.

On 4 September 2025, Ritson signed a two-year deal to return to the semi-professional game on a permanent basis with Barrow, starting in 2026.
