= Jonny Vaughan =

English rugby league footballer

Personal information
- Full name: Jonny Vaughan
- Born: 12 February 2005 (age 21) St Helens, Merseyside, England

Playing information
- Position: Centre, Second-row, Wing
Club
Years	Team	Pld	T	G	FG	P
2024–25	St Helens	8	0	0	0	0
2024(DR)	→ Swinton Lions	10	2	0	0	8
2025(loan)	→ Salford Red Devils	12	2	0	0	8
2026–	Wigan Warriors	0	0	0	0	0
2026(loan)	→ Rochdale Hornets	1	0	0	0	0
2026	→ Salford (loan)	2	0	0	0	0
2026	→ Keighley Cougars (loan)	1	0	0	0	0
2026	→ Halifax Panthers (loan)	3	0	0	0	0
	Total	37	4	0	0	16
- Source: As of 28 July 2026

Jonny Vaughan (born 12 February 2005) is a professional rugby league footballer who plays as a centre, second-row or winger for the Wigan Warriors in the Super League.

== Background ==
He is a former 4 x amateur world champion kickboxer.

== Club career ==
=== St Helens ===
Vaughan spent his youth career playing for the St Helens academy team.

In round 16 of the 2024 Super League season, Vaughan made his club debut for St Helens in their 8–6 loss against Castleford Tigers.

=== Swinton Lions (loan) ===
During 2024, Vaughan also spent time on loan with Swinton in the RFL Championship.

=== Salford Red Devils (loan) ===
On 29 March 2025, Vaughan joined the struggling Salford side on loan for the rest of the season after finding opportunities limited with St Helens.

=== Wigan Warriors ===
On 21 September 2025, it was announced that Vaughan had signed a contract to join St Helens arch-rivals Wigan ahead of the 2026 Super League season.

=== Rochdale Hornets (loan) ===
On 12 February 2026 it was reported that he had signed for Rochdale Hornets in the RFL Championship on one-week loan

=== Salford RLFC (loan) ===
On 5 March 2026 it was reported that he had signed for Salford RLFC in the RFL Championship on loan
