= Jake Burns (rugby league) =

English rugby league footballer

Personal information
- Full name: Jake Burns
- Born: 23 June 2000 (age 26) St Helens, Merseyside, England

Playing information
- Position: Hooker
Club
Years	Team	Pld	T	G	FG	P
2022–	St Helens	24	5	0	0	20
2023(DR)	→ North Wales Crusaders	13	4	0	1	17
2024(DR)	→ Swinton Lions	4	1	0	0	4
	Total	41	10	0	1	41
- Source: As of 12 August 2026

Jake Burns (born 23 June 2000) is a professional rugby league footballer who plays as a hooker for St Helens in the Super League,

== Background ==
He was signed into the St Helens system after he impressed at the amateur side, Halton Farnworth Hornets.

== Club career ==
=== St Helens ===
Burns was initially offered a three-month train and trial deal with St Helens. At the time Burns was working as a trainee accountant. Burns was St Helens reserves player of the year in 2022.

In 2023, he joined North Wales on loan where he made 13 appearances.

In round 16 of the 2024 Super League season, Burns made his club debut for St Helens in their 8-6 loss against Castleford. Burns also spent time during the 2024 season on loan at Swinton.
