= 2024 Super League season =

Rugby league season 2024

- League: Super League
- Duration: 27 rounds
- Teams: 12
- Matches played: 166
- Points scored: 6,568
- Highest attendance: 20,511: Wigan Warriors; vs; Leigh Leopards; (5 October)
- Lowest attendance: 1,900: London Broncos; vs; Catalans Dragons; (4 August)
- Average attendance: 9,193
- Total attendance: 1,594,135
- Broadcast partners: Sky Sports; BBC Sport; SuperLeague+; Fox League; NITV; Fox Soccer Plus; Sport Klub; beIN Sports

2024 Season
- Champions: Wigan Warriors (7th Super League title 24th British title)
- League Leaders Shield: Wigan Warriors
- Runners-up: Hull Kingston Rovers
- Biggest home win: Wigan Warriors: 64–0; Salford Red Devils: (19 September)
- Biggest away win: Huddersfield Giants: 0–66; Warrington Wolves (14 September)
- Man of Steel: (England) Mikey Lewis
- Top point-scorer: (England) Mikey Lewis (216)
- Top try-scorer: (England) Liam Marshall (27)

Grading
- Elevated: Wakefield Trinity
- Demoted: London Broncos

The 2024 Super League season, known as the 2024 Betfred Super League for sponsorship reasons, was the 29th season of the Super League and 130th season of rugby league in Great Britain.

Wigan Warriors were the defending champions, having beaten Catalans Dragons in the 2023 Grand Final to win their sixth Super League title. They retained their title by defeating Hull KR 9–2 in the Final, and by doing so, they become the first team in Super League history to win all 4 major trophies in the same year.

London Broncos were promoted from the Championship, having beaten Toulouse Olympique in the 2023 Championship Grand Final.

Hull KR reached their first ever Grand Final, after a narrow 10–8 victory over Warrington Wolves in the semi finals.

== Structure changes ==
At the end of the 2023 season, IMG and the Rugby Football League (RFL) released initial gradings, indicating which league clubs would likely be playing in from the 2025 system. This transition to the new gradings-based system means there will be no automatic relegation as a result of finishing 12th from 2024.

On 23 October, the RFL released the gradings for the 2025 season, which saw London Broncos relegated back to the Championship, with Wakefield Trinity being promoted.

== Broadcasting ==
In a major change for the 2024 season, for the first time every fixture from the 27 regular rounds as well as the play-offs was broadcast live on Sky Sports, who had exclusive rights to two fixtures per round, with four being shown on a new streaming service, SuperLeague+. The games televised by Sky Sports between round 1 and round 15 were confirmed prior to the start of the season.

On 7 February, BBC Sport announced a three-year deal with the league, replacing Channel 4 as the league's free-to-air partner. Ten games per season will be shown live on television, with a further five shown on iPlayer, the BBC's streaming platform. The deal ended the BBC's Super League Show after 25 years, with condensed highlights of all games being added to iPlayer within 24 hours.

== Teams ==
The league comprises 12 teams. The regular season comprises 27 rounds. Wigan Warriors are the defending champions after winning the 2023 Grand Final. Wakefield Trinity finished bottom in 2023 and were relegated to the Championship for 2024, they were replaced by promoted London Broncos who won the 2023 Championship Grand Final after finishing 5th in the table.

Locations of the 2024 Super League teams in Northern England
Locations of 2024 Super League teams in Greater London
Locations of 2024 Super League teams in France

Team	2023 position	Grading	Stadium (Capacity)	City/Town
Castleford Tigers	11th	B	Wheldon Road (12,000)	Castleford, West Yorkshire
Catalans Dragons	2nd (Runner-up)	A	Stade Gilbert Brutus (13,000)	Perpignan, Pyrénées-Orientales, France
Huddersfield Giants	9th	B	Kirklees Stadium (24,121)	Huddersfield, West Yorkshire
Hull FC	10th	A	MKM Stadium (25,400)	Kingston upon Hull, East Riding of Yorkshire
Hull Kingston Rovers (2024 season)	4th (Eliminated in Semi final)	A	Craven Park (12,225)	Kingston upon Hull, East Riding of Yorkshire
Leeds Rhinos	8th	A	Headingley Rugby Stadium (21,062)	Leeds, West Yorkshire
Leigh Leopards	5th (Eliminated in Eliminator play off)	B	Leigh Sports Village (11,000)	Leigh, Greater Manchester
London Broncos (2024 season)	5th in Championship, Promoted	B	Plough Lane (9,215)	Wimbledon, London
Salford Red Devils	7th	B	Salford Community Stadium (12,000)	Salford, Greater Manchester
St Helens	3rd (Eliminated in Semi final)	A	Totally Wicked Stadium (18,000)	St Helens, Merseyside
Warrington Wolves	6th (Eliminated in Eliminator play off)	A	Halliwell Jones Stadium (15,200)	Warrington, Cheshire
Wigan Warriors (2024 season)	1st (Champions)	A	Brick Community Stadium (25,133)	Wigan, Greater Manchester

== Fixtures and results ==
=== Matches decided by golden point ===
If a match ends in a draw after 80 minutes, then a further 10 minutes of golden point extra time is played, to determine a winner (five minutes each way). The first team to score either a try, penalty goal or drop goal during this period, will win the match. However, if there are no further scores during the additional 10 minutes period, then the match will end in a draw.

==== Game 1 (Leigh Leopards v Castleford Tigers) ====
The round 10 game between Leigh Leopards and Castleford Tigers on 4 May 2024, finished 28–28 after 80 minutes, after Castleford scored a last minute try to level the scores. The game then went to extra time, with the only real chance coming in the 8th added minute, as Matt Moylan's drop goal attempt hit the post. Neither team could score any points, so the game ended as a draw.

==== Game 2 (Leeds Rhinos v London Broncos) ====
The round 16 game between Leeds Rhinos and London Broncos on 6 July 2024, finished 16–16 after 80 minutes, after Leeds scored a late try to level the scores. The game then went to extra time, with the only chance coming in the 4th added minute, as Brodie Croft kicked the winning drop goal to win the match for Leeds 17–16.

==== Game 3 (Hull KR v Catalans Dragons) ====
The round 16 fixture between Hull Kingston Rovers and Catalans Dragons on 6 July 2024, finished 14–14 after 80 minutes, as Rovers kicked a late penalty goal to level the scores. The game then went to extra time, but neither team could score any points during the first period. With less than 3 minutes of the second period remaining, Theo Fages kicked the winning drop goal to win the match for Catalans 15–14.

==== Game 4 (St Helens v Salford Red Devils) ====
The round 21 fixture between St Helens and Salford Red Devils on 8 August 2024, finished 16–16 after 80 minutes. The game then went to extra time, With Moses Mbye kicking the winning drop goal, to win the game for St Helens 17-16.

==== Game 5 (London Broncos v Leeds Rhinos) ====
The round 24 fixture between London Broncos and Leeds Rhinos on 1 September 2024, finished 20–20 after 80 minutes, after London scored a late try to level the scores. The game then went to extra time, and with less than a minute of the second half remaining, Brodie Croft kicked the winning drop goal once again, just as he did in the reverse fixture in round 16, to win the game for Leeds 21-20.

==== Game 6 (Warrington Wolves v St Helens) ====
The Elimination play off fixture between Warrington Wolves and St Helens on 28 September 2024, finished 22-22 after 80 minutes, after Jon Bennison scored a last minute try for St Helens to bring St Helens to within 2 points. Mark Percival then kicked the conversion from the touchline to level the scores. The game then went to extra time, with the only chance coming in the 85th minute, with George Williams kicking the winning drop goal for Warrington, after Percival had kicked the ball out on the full.

== Table ==
Pos	Team	Pld	W	D	L	PF	PA	PD	Pts	Qualification
1	Wigan Warriors (C)	27	22	0	5	723	338	+385	44	Advance to Semi-finals
2	Hull Kingston Rovers (Y)	27	21	0	6	719	326	+393	42	Advance to Semi-finals
3	Warrington Wolves	27	20	0	7	740	319	+421	40	Advance to Eliminators
4	Salford Red Devils	27	16	0	11	550	547	+3	32	Advance to Eliminators
5	Leigh Leopards	27	15	1	11	566	398	+168	31	Advance to Eliminators
6	St Helens	27	15	0	12	596	388	+208	30	Advance to Eliminators
7	Catalans Dragons	27	15	0	12	474	427	+47	30	
8	Leeds Rhinos	27	14	0	13	530	488	+42	28	
9	Huddersfield Giants	27	10	0	17	468	660	−192	20	
10	Castleford Tigers	27	7	1	19	425	735	−310	15	
11	Hull FC	27	3	0	24	328	894	−566	6	
12	London Broncos (R)	27	3	0	24	317	916	−599	6	Relegated to Championship

(C) Champions; (R) Relegated; (Y) Runners up

== Play-offs ==
=== Team bracket ===
Eliminators
4	Salford	6
5	Leigh	14
3	Warrington	23
6	St Helens	22

Semi-finals
1	Wigan	38
5	Leigh	0
2	Hull KR	10
3	Warrington	8

Grand Final
1	Wigan	9
2	Hull KR	2

=== Week 1: Eliminators ===
27 September 2024
20:00 BST (UTC+01)

Salford Red Devils	6–14	Leigh Leopards
Tries: Ryan 79'; Goals: Sneyd 28' (pen)	1st: 2–0; 2nd: 4–14; Report	Tries: Charnley 53'; O'Brien 59'; Ipape 66'; Goals: Moylan 60'

Salford Community Stadium, Salford
Attendance: 10,867
Referee: Jack Smith
Touch judges: Richard Thompson, Mark Craven

Team details
Salford Red Devils		Position	Leigh Leopards
Name	Number	Position	Number	Name
Chris Hankinson	23	FB	6	Matt Moylan 60'
Ethan Ryan 79'	2	WG	34	Darnell McIntosh
Nene Macdonald	3	CE	24	Umyla Hanley
Tim Lafai	4	CE	4	Ricky Leutele
Deon Cross	5	WG	5	Josh Charnley 53'
Jayden Nikorima	32	SO	1	Gareth O'Brien 59'
Marc Sneyd 28'	7	SH	7	Lachlan Lam
Brad Singleton (substituted off) 26' (substituted on) 49'	8	PR	8	Tom Amone (substituted off) 32' (substituted on) 61'
Joe Mellor	24	HK	9	Edwin Ipape 66'
Gil Dudson (substituted off) 19'	27	PF	10	Robbie Mulhern (substituted off) 51' (substituted on) 72'
Sam Stone (substituted off) 61'	11	SR	12	Jack Hughes (yellow card) 77'
Kallum Watkins	12	SR	16	Frankie Halton (substituted off) 9'
Oliver Partington (substituted off) 65'	13	LF	13	John Asiata
Ryan Brierley (substituted on) 61'	1	IN	33	Brad Dwyer
Shane Wright (substituted on) 26' (substituted off) 63'	15	IN	3	Zak Hardaker (substituted on) 9'
Joe Shorrocks (substituted on) 65'	16	IN	35	Aaron Pene (substituted on) 51', (substituted off) 72'
Loghan Lewis (substituted on) 19' (substituted off) 49'	29	IN	17	Owen Trout (substituted on) 32', (substituted off) 61'
Paul Rowley		Coach		Adrian Lam

This match was broadcast on BBC Two and set a new television audience record for a Super League playoff game at 385,000, beating the previous record of 330,000 set in 2022 with St Helens against Salford.

28 September 2024
17:30 BST (UTC+01)

Warrington Wolves	23–22 (g.p.)	St Helens
Tries: King 2', 54'; Ashton 36', 66'; Goals: Thewlis 37', 55', 67'; Field goals: Williams 85'	1st: 10–16; 2nd: 13–6; Report	Tries: Makinson 12', 32'; Percival 24'; Bennison 79'; Goals: Percival 13', 25', 80'

Halliwell Jones Stadium, Warrington
Attendance: 12,211
Referee: Liam Moore
Touch judges: Johnny Roberts, Warren Turley

Team details
Warrington Wolves		Position	St Helens
Name	Number	Position	Number	Name
Matt Dufty	1	FB	1	Jack Welsby
Josh Thewlis 37, 56, 69'	2	WG	2	Tommy Makinson 12', 32'
Rodrick Tai	14	CE	11	Sione Mata'utia
Toby King 2', 54'	3	CE	4	Mark Percival 25' 14', 26', 80'
Matty Ashton 36', 66'	5	WG	5	Jon Bennison 79'
George Williams	6	SO	6	Jonny Lomax
Josh Drinkwater	7	SH	7	Lewis Dodd
Luke Yates	41	PR	8	Alex Walmsley (substituted off) 21' (substituted on) 62'
Danny Walker	9	HK	9	Daryl Clark (substituted off) 69' (substituted on) 83'
Zane Musgrove	16	PF	10	Matty Lees (substituted off) 29' (substituted on) 48'
John Bateman	42	SR	19	Matt Whitley
Matty Nicholson	13	SR	12	Joe Batchelor
Ben Currie	12	LF	13	Morgan Knowles (substituted off) 30' (substituted on) 46'
Sam Powell	32	IN	15	James Bell (substituted on) 29' (substituted off) 46'
James Harrison	8	IN	17	Agnatius Paasi (substituted on) 30' (substituted off) 48'
Paul Vaughan	10	IN	20	George Delaney (substituted on) 21' (substituted off) 62'
Joe Philbin	15	IN	24	Jake Burns (substituted on) 69' (substituted off) 83'
Sam Burgess		Coach		Paul Wellens

=== Week 2: Semi-finals ===
Hull KR were without captain Elliot Minchella, after he was handed a 2 match suspension.

4 October 2024
20:00 BST (UTC+01)

Hull KR	10–8	Warrington Wolves
Tries: Batchelor 17'; Burgess 35'; Goals: Lewis 36'	1st: 10–0; 2nd: 0–8; Report	Tries: Ashton 46', 59'

Craven Park, Hull
Attendance: 12,225 (Note: No official attendance given, but the match was a sellout.)
Referee: Liam Moore
Touch judges: Johnny Roberts, Warren Turley

Team details
Hull KR		Position	Warrington Wolves
Name	Number	Position	Number	Name
Niall Evalds	2	FB	1	Matt Dufty
Joe Burgess	35	WG	2	Josh Thewlis
Peta Hiku	1	CE	14	Rodrick Tai
Jack Broadbent	36	CE	3	Toby King
Ryan Hall	5	WG	5	Matty Ashton 46', 59'
Tyrone May	6	SO	6	George Williams
Mikey Lewis	7	SH	7	Josh Drinkwater
Sauaso Sue (substituted off) 22'	8	PR	41	Luke Yates
Matt Parcell	14	HK	9	Danny Walker
Jai Whitbread	16	PF	16	Zane Musgrove
Matty Storton (substituted off) 27'	17	SR	42	John Bateman
James Batchelor	12	SR	13	Matty Nicholson
Dean Hadley	11	LF	12	Ben Currie
Jez Litten	9	IN	32	Sam Powell
Sam Luckley (substituted on) 22'	15	IN	8	James Harrison
Kelepi Tanginoa (substituted on) 27'	20	IN	10	Paul Vaughan
Jack Brown	37	IN	15	Joe Philbin
Willie Peters		Coach		Sam Burgess

5 October 2024
17:30 BST (UTC+01)

Wigan Warriors	38–0	Leigh Leopards
Tries: Marshall 11', 38'; Walters 19', 42'; French 60'; Field 78'; Goals: Keighran 20', 30' (pen), 39', 43', 56' (pen), 60', 79'	1st: 18–0; 2nd: 20–0; Report

Brick Community Stadium, Wigan
Attendance: 20,511
Referee: Chris Kendall
Touch judges: Richard Thompson, Mark Craven

Team details
Wigan Warriors		Position	Leigh Leopards
Name	Number	Position	Number	Name
Jai Field	1	FB	6	Matt Moylan
Abbas Miski	2	WG	3	Zak Hardaker
Adam Keighran	3	CE	4	Ricky Leutele
Jake Wardle	4	CE	24	Umyla Hanley
Liam Marshall 11', 38'	5	WG	34	Darnell McIntosh
Bevan French	6	SO	1	Gareth O'Brien
Harry Smith	7	SH	7	Lachlan Lam
Ethan Havard (substituted off) 23' (substituted on) 57'	8	PR	8	Tom Amone (substituted off) 33'
Kruise Leeming (substituted off) 49'	17	HK	9	Edwin Ipape
Luke Thomson (substituted off) 37'	16	PF	10	Robbie Mulhern (substituted off) 47'
Junior Nsemba	21	SR	20	Oliver Holmes
Sam Walters	22	SR	12	Jack Hughes
Kaide Ellis (substituted off) 48'	13	LF	13	John Asiata
Liam Byrne (substituted on) 37' (substituted off) 69'	10	IN	17	Owen Trout
Patrick Mago (substituted on) 48'	15	IN	35	Aaron Pene (substituted on) 33'
Tyler Dupree (substituted on) 23' (substituted off) 57' (substituted on) 69'	19	IN	15	Matt Davis
Tom Forber (substituted on) 49'	27	IN	33	Brad Dwyer (substituted on) 47'
Matt Peet		Coach		Adrian Lam

=== Week 3: Grand Final ===
12 October 2024
18:00 BST (UTC+01)

Wigan Warriors	9–2	Hull KR
Try: French 23'; Con: Keighran 24'; Pen: Keighran 62'; Drop: Smith 40'	Report	Pen: Lewis 57'

Old Trafford, Manchester
Attendance: 68,173
Referee: Chris Kendall
Touch Judges: Richard Thompson & Johnny Roberts
Video referee: Liam Moore
Rob Burrow Award: Bevan French

== End-of-season awards ==
The end of season awards took place on Tuesday 8 October. The winners were:

- Man of Steel: (England) Mikey Lewis
- Coach of the Year: (Australia) Willie Peters
- Young Player of the Year: (England) Junior Nsemba
- Top tackler: (England) Cameron Smith: (992 tackles)
- Top try scorer: (England) Liam Marshall: (27 tries)
- Spirit of Super League: Bill Arthur

== Player statistics ==
=== Top try scorer ===
Player (s)	Club	Tries
(England) Liam Marshall	Wigan Warriors	27

=== Top try assists ===
Player (s)	Club	Assists
(Papua New Guinea) Lachlan Lam	Leigh Leopards	24
(England) Mikey Lewis	Hull KR	24

=== Top goal scorer ===
Player	Club	Goals
(England) Marc Sneyd	Salford Red Devils	98/110

=== Top points scorer ===
Rank	Player	Club	Points
1	(England) Mikey Lewis	Hull KR	216

== Attendances ==
=== Club attendances ===
Club	Home Games	Total	Average	Highest	Lowest
Castleford Tigers	13	103,226	7,940	10,117	6,965
Catalans Dragons	13	119,104	9,162	11,083	7,750
Huddersfield Giants	13	58,912	4,532	6,812	3,330
Hull FC	13	142,669	10,975	20,014	5,771
Hull KR	13	128,479	9,883	11,050	9,524
Leeds Rhinos	13	182,453	14,035	17,535	12,297
Leigh Leopards	13	109,072	8,390	10,308	6,677
London Broncos	13	41,320	3,178	5,102	1,900
Salford Red Devils	13	60,392	4,646	6,177	2,843
St Helens	13	159,084	12,237	17,980	9,808
Warrington Wolves	13	130,833	10,064	12,181	8,471
Wigan Warriors	13	193,826	14,910	20,152	11,660

=== Top 10 attendances ===
As of 22 September 2024 (Round 27)

Rank	Home team	Away team	Stadium	Attendance
1	Magic Weekend: Day 1		Elland Road	30,810
2	Magic Weekend: Day 2		Elland Road	22,293
3	Wigan Warriors	St Helens	Brick Community Stadium	20,152
4	Hull FC	Hull KR	MKM Stadium	20,014
5	St Helens	Wigan Warriors	Totally Wicked Stadium	17,980
6	Leeds Rhinos	Leigh Leopards	AMT Headingley Stadium	17,535
7	Wigan Warriors	Hull KR	Brick Community Stadium	16,719
8	Wigan Warriors	Leigh Leopards	Brick Community Stadium	16,053
9	Wigan Warriors	Warrington Wolves	Brick Community Stadium	15,764
10	Wigan Warriors	Salford Red Devils	Brick Community Stadium	15,589
