= Noah Stephens =

English rugby league footballer

Personal information
- Full name: Noah Stephens
- Born: 3 October 2004 (age 22)

Playing information
- Position: Prop
Club
Years	Team	Pld	T	G	FG	P
2024–	St Helens	35	2	0	0	8
2024(DR)	→ Swinton Lions	2	0	0	0	0
	Total	37	2	0	0	8
- Source: As of 4 August 2026

Noah Stephens (born 3 October 2004) is a professional rugby league footballer who plays as a prop for St Helens in the Super League.

== Club career ==
Stephens played for local community side Pilkington Recs before being spotted by St Helens. Stephens then went on to play for St Helens academy side. In round 11 of the 2024 Super League season, Stephens made his club debut for St Helens in their 60-4 victory over Castleford. On 4 February 2025, Stephens signed a four-year contract extension keeping him at St Helens until the end of 2028. Stephens was limited to just eight appearances for St Helens in the 2026 Super League season as the club finished 7th on the table and missed the playoffs.
