= Owen Dagnall =

English rugby league footballer

Personal information
- Full name: Owen Dagnall
- Born: 21 September 2005 (age 21) St Helens, Merseyside, England
- Height: 6 ft 1 in (1.85 m)
- Weight: 14 st 2 lb (90 kg)

Playing information
- Position: Wing
Club
Years	Team	Pld	T	G	FG	P
2025–	St Helens	29	14	0	0	56
2025(DR)	→ Halifax Panthers	1	1	0	0	4
	Total	30	15	0	0	60
- Source: As of 4 November 2026

Owen Dagnall is an English professional rugby league footballer who plays as a winger for St Helens in the Super League.

== Background ==
Dagnall played his junior rugby league for Halton Farnworth Hornets.

== Club career ==
=== St Helens ===
Dagnall joined the St Helens academy team at the age of fourteen. Dagnall made his club debut for St Helens in round 3 of the 2025 Challenge Cup against West Hull. In round 12 of the 2025 Super League season, Dagnall played his first match in the competition against Huddersfield as St Helens won 46–4. Dagnall played 15 matches for St Helens in the 2026 Super League season as the club finished 7th and missed the playoffs.
