= Lachlan Lam =

PNG international rugby league footballer

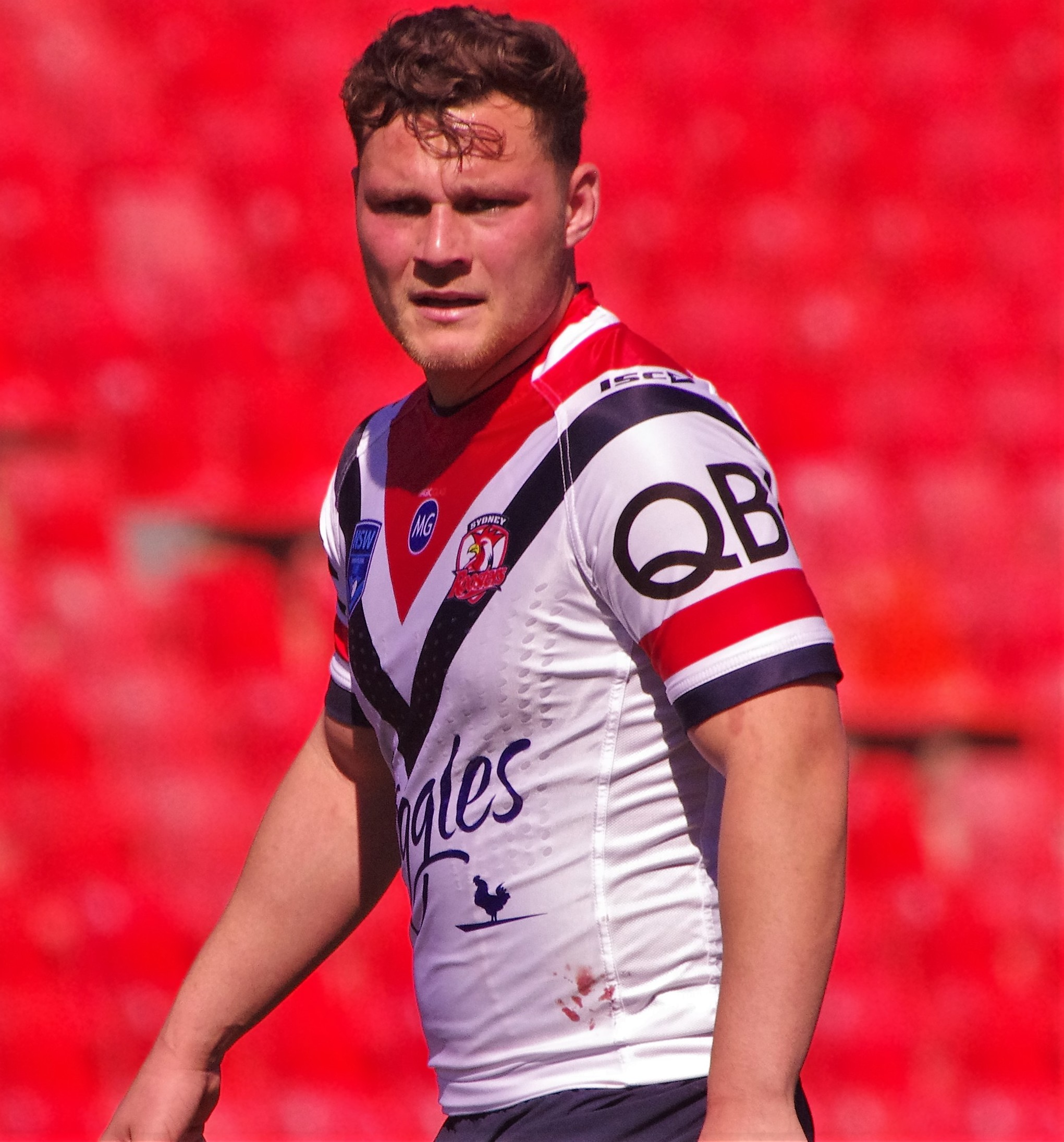

Personal information
- Full name: Lachlan Lam
- Born: 25 March 1998 (age 28) Sydney, New South Wales, Australia
- Height: 5 ft 10 in (1.78 m)
- Weight: 14 st 0 lb (89 kg)

Playing information
- Position: Scrum-half, Stand-off
Club
Years	Team	Pld	T	G	FG	P
2019–21	Sydney Roosters	31	3	0	0	12
2022–	Leigh Leopards	134	39	0	1	157
	Total	165	42	0	1	169
Representative
Years	Team	Pld	T	G	FG	P
2017–	Papua New Guinea	15	7	0	0	28
2018	PNG Prime Minister's XIII	1	0	0	0	0
- Source: As of 22 November 2026
- Father: Adrian Lam

Lachlan Lam (born 25 March 1998) is a Papua New Guinea international rugby league footballer who plays as a scrum-half or stand-off for the Leigh Leopards in the Super League.

He previously played for the Sydney Roosters in the National Rugby League (NRL).

== Background ==
Lam was born and raised in Sydney, New South Wales, Australia. He is of Papua New Guinean, Chinese and English descent through his father Adrian, a former professional rugby league player who represented Papua New Guinea and Queensland.

== Playing career ==
=== Youth career ===
Lam grew up playing junior rugby league for the Clovelly Crocodiles and attended Marcellin College.

When his father played for the Wigan Warriors, Lam played as a junior for Wigan St Patricks.

Lam has been in the Sydney Roosters' youth system since he was 13, playing for their Harold Matthews Cup and S. G. Ball Cup teams. In 2014, Lam became the first player to utilise the 'father-son rule' introduced a year prior when he was selected to represent the Queensland under-16s team.

Having made his NYC debut in 2016, Lam was the first choice five-eighth for the Roosters in 2017. In October, he was named in Papua New Guinea's squad for the 2017 World Cup. Lam made his Test debut against the United States on 12 November, becoming Kumul #283.

=== Sydney Roosters ===
In Round 2 of the 2019 season, Lam made his first grade debut for the Sydney Roosters against Manly-Warringah at Brookvale Oval. On 7 April 2019, Lam scored a hat-trick for the North Sydney Bears against the Canterbury-Bankstown Bulldogs in a 42–0 victory at North Sydney Oval.

On 30 September 2019, Lam was named in the Papua New Guinea team for the Downer World Cup 9s.

He made seven appearances for the Roosters in the 2020 NRL season as the club fell short of a third successive premiership.

Lam played a total of 20 games for them in the 2021 NRL season including the club's two finals matches. The Roosters would be eliminated from the second week of the finals losing to Manly 42–6.

=== Leigh Leopards ===
On 21 July 2022, Lam signed a two-year deal to join RFL Championship side Leigh until the end of 2023. Lam scored a try on debut for Leigh against Featherstone Rovers and setup one for team-mate Joe Wardle at the 2022 Summer Bash in Leeds. On 3 October 2022, Lam played for Leigh in their Championship Grand Final victory over Batley which saw the club promoted back to the Super League. On 12 August 2023, Lam kicked the winning drop goal one minute into golden point extra-time for Leigh in the 2023 Challenge Cup Final against Hull Kingston Rovers, after the match finished 16–16 at full time. Lam also won the Lance Todd Trophy as man of the match. Lam played 28 games for Leigh in the 2023 Super League season as the club finished fifth on the table and qualified for the playoffs. He played in their elimination playoff loss against Hull Kington Rovers. Lam played 28 games for Leigh in the 2024 Super League season which saw the club finish fifth on the table. He won the Rugby League Writers and Broadcasters' Association Player of the Year for a second time in 2025. In the 2025 Super League season, Lam played 28 games including Leigh's 18-6 semi-final loss against rivals Wigan.

== Honours ==
=== Leigh Leopards ===
- Challenge Cup
  - Winners (1): 2023
- RFL Championship
  - Winners (1): 2022
- RFL Championship Leaders' Shield
  - Winners (1): 2022

=== Individual ===
- Super League Dream Team
  - Winners (1): 2023
- RLWBA Player of the Year:
  - Winners (2): 2023, 2025
- Lance Todd Trophy
  - Winners (1): 2023

== Statistics ==
Year	Team	Games	Tries	FGs	Pts
2019	Sydney Roosters	4			
2020	Sydney Roosters	7			
2021	Sydney Roosters	20	3		12
2022	Leigh Leopards	9	4		16
2023	Leigh Leopards	32	10	1	41
2024	Leigh Leopards	30	6		24
2025	Leigh Leopards	33	7		28
2026	Leigh Leopards	30	12		48
2027	Leigh Leopards				
	Totals	165	42	1	169
