= Lewis Murphy (rugby league) =

English rugby league footballer

Personal information
- Born: 24 March 2002 (age 24) England

Playing information
- Position: Wing
Club
Years	Team	Pld	T	G	FG	P
2022–23	Wakefield Trinity	24	19	0	0	76
2024	Sydney Roosters	0	0	0	0	0
2025–	St Helens	25	17	0	0	68
	Total	49	36	0	0	144
- Source: As of 12 August 2026

Lewis Murphy (born 24 March 2002) is an English professional rugby league footballer who plays as a winger for St Helens in the Super League.

== Playing career ==
=== Wakefield Trinity ===
Murphy signed a professional contract with Wakefield in July 2021 having come through their academy and impressing at U19 level. Murphy made a quick impression in his first season, scoring seven tries in his first 13 appearances in the Super League. He scored a hat-trick for Wakefield against Hull F.C. on 19 August 2022 including an acrobatic first, in a triumph which all but secured his relegation threatened club with their Super League status for the 2023 season. In round 26 of the 2022 Super League season, Murphy scored four tries for Wakefield in their 34-18 victory over an understrength St Helens RFC team. On 7 March 2023, Murphy was ruled out for the remainder of the 2023 Super League season with an ACL injury.

=== Sydney Roosters ===
On 28 April 2023, it was announced that Murphy had signed a contract with the Sydney Roosters in the National Rugby League for the 2024 season.

=== St Helens ===
On 3 September 2024 after failing to make an NRL appearance for the Sydney Roosters, Murphy signed a two-year contract to join English side St Helens ahead of the 2025 Super League season. Murphy made his club debut for St Helens in round 1 of the 2025 Super League season and scored a try in their 82-0 victory over Salford. On 3 June 2025, it was announced that Murphy would miss at least eight weeks with a quad injury. Murphy played 12 matches for St Helens in the 2026 Super League season as the club finished 7th on the table and missed the finals.

== Style of play ==
Former Wakefield Trinity coach Willie Poching described Murphy as not the biggest player to play on the wing but his main attributes are his speed and agility. He has been described as possessing “pace to burn” with the athleticism to be a threat in the air and the potential to cover several roles in a squad.
