= Robbie Mulhern =

England & Ireland international rugby league footballer

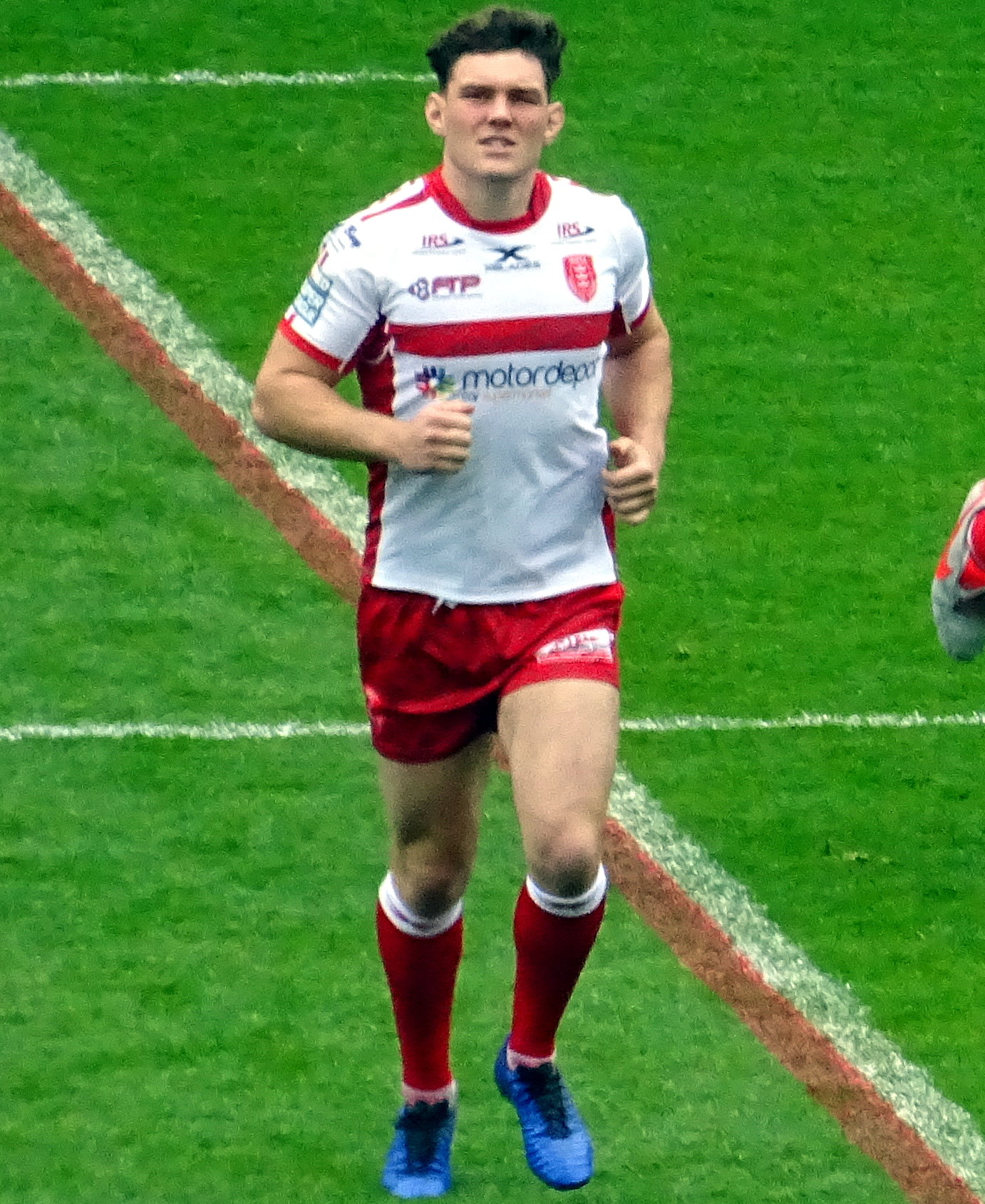

Personal information
- Full name: Robert Shaun Michael Mulhern
- Born: 18 October 1994 (age 32) Pontefract, West Yorkshire, England
- Height: 6 ft 3 in (1.91 m)
- Weight: 17 st 0 lb (108 kg)

Playing information
- Position: Prop, Loose forward
Club
Years	Team	Pld	T	G	FG	P
2014–15	Leeds Rhinos	5	0	0	0	0
2015(loan)	→ Hunslet Hawks	20	2	0	0	8
2016–20	Hull Kingston Rovers	110	11	0	0	44
2016(loan)	→ Newcastle Thunder	1	0	0	0	0
2021–22	Warrington Wolves	47	1	0	0	4
2023–26	Leigh Leopards	102	6	0	0	24
2027–	Castleford Tigers	0	0	0	0	0
	Total	285	20	0	0	80
Representative
Years	Team	Pld	T	G	FG	P
2014–22	Ireland	5	0	0	0	0
2018–23	England	2	0	0	0	0
2018	England Knights	2	0	0	0	0
- Source: As of 6 November 2026

Robert Shaun Michael Mulhern (born 18 October 1994) is an English professional rugby league footballer who plays as a prop forward for Castleford Tigers in the Super League. He has represented Ireland, England and the England Knights at international level.

He has previously played for Leeds Rhinos, Warrington Wolves and Hull Kingston Rovers in the Super League. He has spent time on loan at Hunslet Hawks in the Championship and at Newcastle Thunder in League 1. He will join the Castleford Tigers from the 2027 season.

== Background ==
Mulhern was born in Pontefract, West Yorkshire, England.

As a junior he played for the Castleford Panthers, Normanton Knights and he spent time in the Wakefield Trinity Wildcats' Academy System.

== Club career ==
=== Leeds Rhinos ===
Mulhern made only five appearances for the Leeds Rhinos during 2014 and 2015.

==== Hunslet Hawks (loan) ====
Mulhern was loaned to the Hunslet Hawks in the 2015 rugby league season. He made twenty appearances and scored two tries.

=== Hull Kingston Rovers ===
Mulhern joined Hull Kingston Rovers ahead of the 2016 Super League season. Mulhern suffered relegation from the Super League with Hull Kingston Rovers in the 2016 season, due to losing the Million Pound Game by the Salford Red Devils.

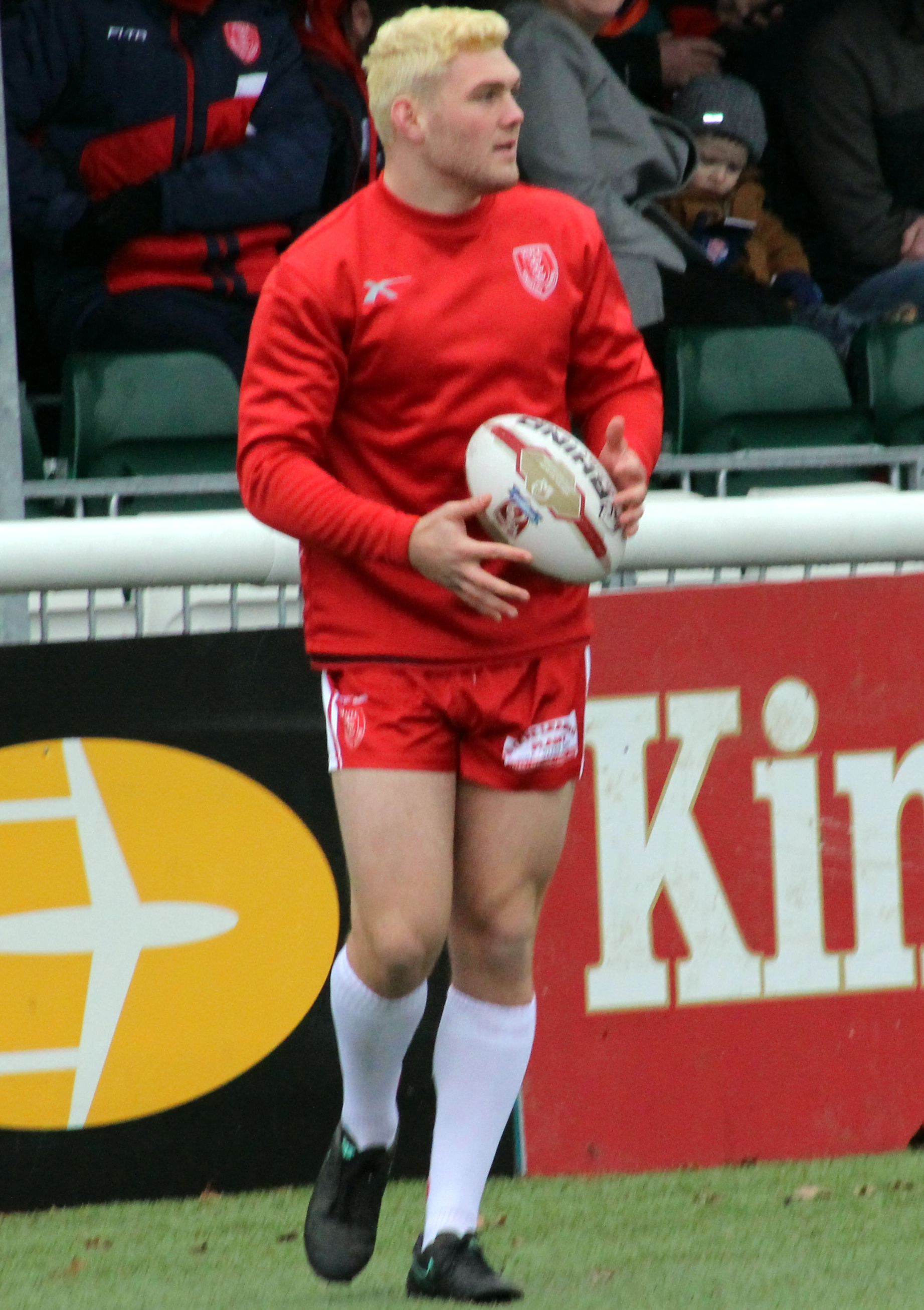
Mulhern in action for Hull KR in 2017

12-months later however, Mulhern was part of the Hull Kingston Rovers' side that won promotion back to the Super League, at the first time of asking following relegation the season prior. It was revealed on 1 May 2018, that Mulhern had signed a new long-term contract, to remain at Hull Kingston Rovers until at least the end of the 2021 rugby league season.

=== Warrington Wolves ===
It was announced on 10 December 2020 that Mulhern would join Warrington on a two-year contract in a swap deal with Luis Johnson for the 2021 season.

=== Leigh Leopards ===
On 20 October 2022, it was announced that Mulhern had signed a contract to join the newly promoted Leigh side.

On 12 August 2023, Mulhern played for Leigh in the 2023 Challenge Cup final victory over Hull Kingston Rovers. Mulhern played twenty-seven games for Leigh in the 2023 Super League season as the club finished fifth on the table and qualified for the playoffs. He played in their elimination playoff loss against Hull Kingston Rovers.

Mulhern played twenty-two games for Leigh in the 2024 Super League season which saw the club finish fifth on the table. He played in the club's semi-final loss against Wigan.

=== Castleford Tigers ===
On 16 July 2026, Castleford Tigers announced the signing of Mulhern on a three-year deal from the 2027 season.

== International career ==
=== Ireland ===
Mulhern is an Ireland international.

=== England ===
It was revealed on 16 October 2018, that Mulhern would be making his England début as an interchange against France on 17 October 2018, in a Test match at the Leigh Sports Village.

England defeated the French 44-6, with Mulhern making an appearance from off the bench.

He won his second cap in Game 3 win over Tonga of the 2023 Tonga tour of England at Headingley.

=== England Knights ===
Following Mulhern's exceptional season for Hull Kingston Rovers, it was revealed by the Rugby Football League on 24 July 2018, that Mulhern had been added to the 25-man England Knights' Performance Squad, that would be touring Papua New Guinea for a two-game Test match series later in the year.

In 2018 he was selected for the England Knights on their tour of Papua New Guinea, and Mulhern would be linking-up with his then Hull Kingston Rovers teammate Chris Atkin, who was already previously announced within the Knights' fold.

Mulhern made his début for the England Knights against Papua New Guinea on 27 October 2018, the game played in Lae ended in a 12-16 victory to the Knights. He played against Papua New Guinea at the Oil Search National Football Stadium.

== Honours ==
=== Career Awards and Accolades ===
==== Hull Kingston Rovers ====
- 2018: 'Young Player of the Year Award'
