= Harry Robertson (rugby league) =

English rugby league footballer

Personal information
- Full name: Harry Robertson
- Born: 21 December 2005 (age 20) Widnes, Cheshire, England
- Height: 6 ft 3 in (1.91 m)
- Weight: 13 st 8 lb (86 kg)

Playing information
- Position: Stand off , Centre , Full back
Club
Years	Team	Pld	T	G	FG	P
2024–	St Helens	60	23	0	0	92
- Source: As of 4 November 2026

Harry Robertson (born 21 December 2005) is a professional rugby league footballer who plays as a centre for St Helens in the Super League. Signed for Wakefield Trinity.

== Background ==
Robertson was signed into the St Helens system after he impressed at the amateur side, Halton Farnworth Hornets.

== Club career ==
=== St Helens ===
Robertson made his club debut for St Helens in round 17 of the 2024 Super League season against arch-rivals Wigan. On 7 February 2025, Robertson signed a four-year contract extension to remain at St Helens until the end of 2028. Robertson played 25 games for St Helens in the 2025 Super League season as the club came within one game of the grand final but lost the semi-final against Hull Kingston Rovers 20-12. On 7 October 2025, Robertson was voted as the Super League's young player of the season. Robertson played 25 matches for St Helens in the 2026 Super League season as the club finished 7th on the table and missed the playoffs. Robertson was later voted as the young player of the year for a second consecutive season.
