= Keanan Brand =

Ireland international rugby league footballer (born 1999)

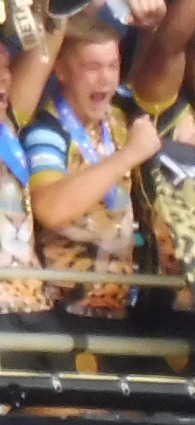

Personal information
- Born: 8 January 1999 (age 27) Wigan, Greater Manchester, England
- Height: 6 ft 0 in (1.84 m)
- Weight: 14 st 9 lb (93 kg)

Playing information
- Position: Centre, Wing
Club
Years	Team	Pld	T	G	FG	P
2018–19	Widnes Vikings	34	9	0	0	36
2020–21	Warrington Wolves	3	0	0	0	0
2021(loan)	→ Leigh Leopards	12	0	0	0	0
2022–	Leigh Leopards	61	35	0	0	140
2023(loan)	→ Barrow Raiders	7	2	0	0	8
2024(loan)	→ Bradford Bulls	1	0	0	0	0
2024(loan)	→Widnes Vikings	6	1	0	0	4
2026–	→ Castleford Tigers (loan)	0	0	0	0	0
	Total	124	47	0	0	188
Representative
Years	Team	Pld	T	G	FG	P
2024	Ireland	1	0	0	0	0
- Source: As of 21 August 2026

Keanan Brand (born 8 January 1999) is an Ireland international rugby league footballer who plays as a centre or winger for the Castleford Tigers in the Super League, on loan from the Leigh Leopards.

He has previously played for Widnes Vikings in the Super League and the RFL Championship, and for Warrington Wolves in the Super League. He has spent time on loan at Leigh Centurions in the Super League, and at Barrow Raiders, Bradford Bulls, and Widnes Vikings in the Championship.

In 2023, Brand appeared as a contestant on the ninth series of Love Island.

== Background ==
Brand was born in Skelmersdale, Lancashire, England.

== Playing career ==
=== Widnes Vikings ===
In 2018 he made his Widnes début in the Super League against Hull Kingston Rovers.

He featured 32 times in 2019 in all competitions for Widnes and was part of the team that made it to Wembley in the AB Sundecks 1895 cup final. He was also nominated for the Championship Young Player of the Year award.

=== Warrington Wolves ===
On 30 September 2019 it was announced that Brand had signed for the Warrington Wolves along with Anthony Gelling.

=== Leigh Leopards ===
On 18 December 2020 newly promoted Leigh Leopards (then Leigh Centurions) signed Brand on a season long loan from Warrington Wolves for the 2021 Betfred Super League season.

On 20 November 2021 it was announced that Brand had left Warrington and signed for Leigh in the Betfred Championship.

==== Bradford Bulls (loan) ====
On 29 February 2024 it was reported that he had signed for Bradford in the RFL Championship on a two-week short-term loan.

==== Widnes Vikings (loan) ====
On 27 June 2024 it was reported that he had signed for Widnes in the RFL Championship on loan.

==== Castleford Tigers (loan) ====
On 19 August 2026, Brand joined Castleford Tigers on loan for the remainder of the season.

== International ==
He made his debut for Ireland v Scotland in October 2024.
