= George Delaney =

English rugby league footballer

Personal information
- Full name: George Delaney
- Born: 4 February 2004 (age 22) Whiston, Merseyside, England
- Height: 184 cm (6 ft 0 in)
- Weight: 98 kg (216 lb; 15 st 6 lb)

Playing information
- Position: Prop
Club
Years	Team	Pld	T	G	FG	P
2022–	St Helens	97	4	0	0	16
2023(DR)	→ Swinton Lions	6	0	0	0	0
	Total	103	4	0	0	16
Representative
Years	Team	Pld	T	G	FG	P
2022	England Knights	1	0	0	0	0
- Source: As of 4 August 2026

George Delaney (born 4 February 2004) is a professional rugby league footballer who plays as a prop for St Helens in the Super League.

== Background ==
St Helens signed him after he was impressed at the amateur side, Halton Farnworth Hornets.

== Club career ==
Delaney made his first team début for Saints in April 2022 against the Castleford Tigers. Delaney played 18 games for St Helens in the 2023 Super League season as the club finished third on the table. He played in St Helens narrow loss against the Catalans Dragons in the semi-final which stopped them from reaching a fifth successive grand final. Delaney played 23 matches for St Helens in the 2024 Super League season which saw the club finish sixth on the table, and he was nominated for the Super League Young Player of the Year award. Delaney played in St Helens golden point extra-time playoff loss against Warrington.

On 10 January 2025, Delaney signed a four-year contract extension to remain at St Helens until the end of 2028. Delaney played 27 games for St Helens in the 2025 Super League season including the clubs 20-12 semi-final loss against Hull Kingston Rovers. Delaney played 20 matches for St Helens in the 2026 Super League season as the club finished 7th on the table and missed the playoffs.

== Representative career ==
On 9 October 2022, Delaney made his début for the England Knights in a 28–4 win against Scotland.
