= Jon Bennison =

English rugby league footballer (born 2002)

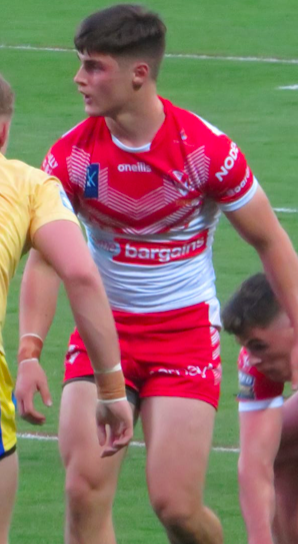

Personal information
- Full name: Jonathan Bennison
- Born: 1 December 2002 (age 23) Runcorn, Cheshire, England
- Height: 5 ft 10 in (1.77 m)
- Weight: 12 st 6 lb (79 kg)

Playing information
- Position: Wing, Fullback
Club
Years	Team	Pld	T	G	FG	P
2021–25	St Helens	71	28	23	0	158
2025 (loan)	→ Widnes Vikings	6	2	0	0	8
2026–	York Knights	2	0	0	0	0
	Total	79	30	23	0	166
- Source: As of 11 June 2026

Jon Bennison (born 1 December 2002) is a professional rugby league footballer who plays as a winger and fullback for the York Knights in the Super League.

Previously Bennison has played for St Helens and Widnes Vikings.

== Playing career ==
=== St Helens ===
Throughout the 2021 Under-19s season, Bennison made eight appearances, scoring seven tries across the campaign.

On 17 September 2021, Bennison made his professional debut, scoring a try in St Helens' 26–14 loss to Salford. On 24 September 2022, Bennison scored a try during St Helens 2022 Super League Grand Final victory over Leeds. Bennison played 19 games for St Helens in the 2023 Super League season as the club finished third on the table. Bennison played in St Helens narrow loss against the Catalans Dragons in the semi-final which ended St Helens four-year dominance of the competition. Bennison played 15 matches for St Helens in the 2024 Super League season as the club finished sixth on the table. He played in St Helens golden point extra-time playoff loss against Warrington. On 14 September 2025, it was announced that Bennison would be departing St Helens at the end of the 2025 Super League season.

=== Widnes Vikings (loan) ===
On 29 July 2025 it was reported that he had signed for Widnes Vikings in the RFL Championship on loan

On 10 September 2025 it was announced that he had been recalled from his season long loan ahead of crucial clash with the Leigh Leopards at the weekend

=== York Knights ===
On 14 October 2025, Bennison signed for York ahead of the 2026 season.
