= Mark Percival =

England international rugby league player

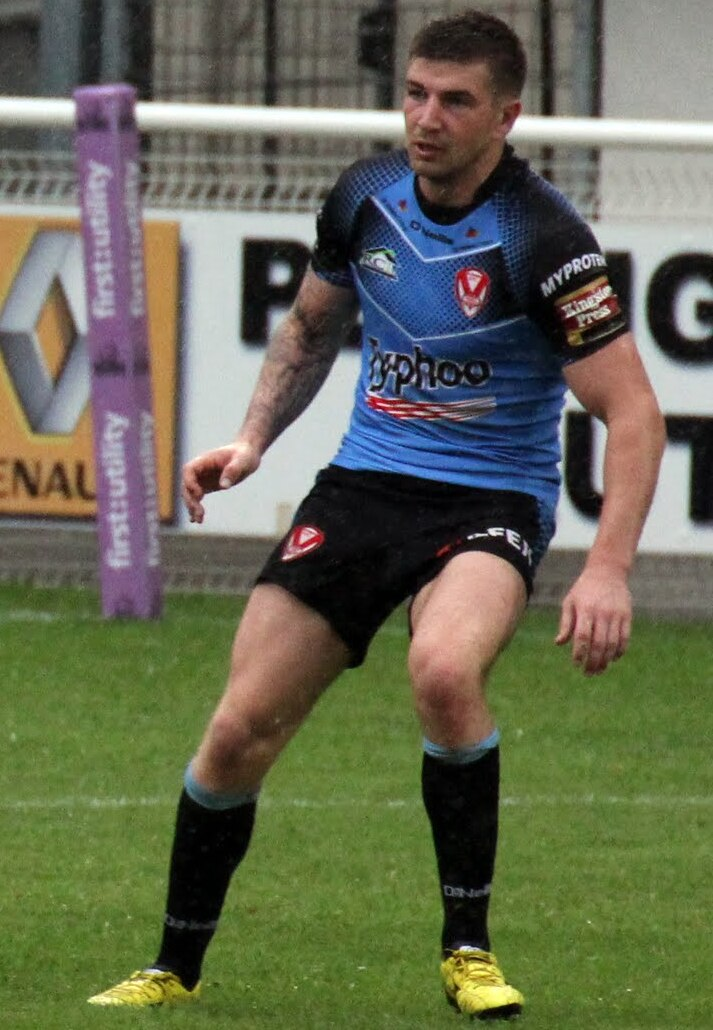

Personal information
- Born: 29 April 1994 (age 32) Widnes, Cheshire, England
- Height: 6 ft 1 in (1.85 m)
- Weight: 13 st 12 lb (88 kg)

Playing information
- Position: Centre
Club
Years	Team	Pld	T	G	FG	P
2013–26	St Helens	273	131	384	0	1292
2014(loan)	→ Rochdale Hornets	1	0	0	0	0
	Total	274	131	384	0	1292
Representative
Years	Team	Pld	T	G	FG	P
2016–18	England	6	2	1	0	10
- Source: As of 17 September 2026

Mark Percival (born 29 April 1994) is a former English professional rugby league footballer who played as a centre for St Helens in the Super League and England at international level.

He made his début for Saints in 2013, winning the Super League Grand Final with the club in 2014, 2019, 2020, 2021, and 2022

== Background ==
Percival was born in Widnes, Cheshire, England.

Percival played junior rugby for Halton Hornets before joining St Helens' academy side.

== Club career ==
Percival made his first team début against Leeds on 1 March 2013. In June 2014, he made one appearance for Rochdale Hornets.

St Helens reached the 2014 Super League Grand Final, and Percival was selected to play at centre in their 14–6 victory over the Wigan side at Old Trafford. In April 2017, Percival signed a new four-year contract with Saints. He was named in the Super League Dream Team for the first time at the end of the 2017 season. He played in the 2019 Challenge Cup Final defeat by Warrington at Wembley Stadium.

He played in the 2019 Super League Grand Final victory over Salford at Old Trafford. Percival missed most of the 2020 Super League season with a shoulder injury. On 17 July 2021, he played for St. Helens in their 26-12 2021 Challenge Cup Final victory over Castleford. Percival played for St Helens in their 2021 Super League Grand Final victory over Catalans Dragons. On 24 September 2022, Percival scored the winning try for St Helens in their 2022 Super League Grand Final victory over Leeds. On 18 February 2023, Percival played in St Helens 13-12 upset victory over Penrith in the 2023 World Club Challenge. Percival played 21 games for St Helens in the 2023 Super League season as the club finished third on the table. He played in St Helens narrow loss against the Catalans Dragons in the semi-final which ended St Helens four-year dominance of the competition. On 8 March 2024, Percival was controversially sent off during St Helens 24-20 loss against Salford for a tackle on Jack Ormondroyd. On 11 March 2024, Percival was suspended for two matches in relation to the tackle. Percival played 21 matches for St Helens in the 2024 Super League season. Percival played in St Helens golden point extra-time playoff loss against Warrington. Percival played 23 games for St Helens in the 2025 Super League season including the clubs 20-12 semi-final loss against Hull Kingston Rovers.

On 4 February 2026, it was revealed that Percival had been told by St Helens officials that he could join another club after his contract extension offer with Saints was rescinded.

On 6 March 2026, it appeared that the contractual negotiations had ended favourably with Percival signing a new extension to take him to beyond the 2026 season On 3 September 2026, Percival announced he would be retiring at the end of the 2026 Super League season. In his last match on 11 September 2026, before retirement, he scored one try and one kicked one goal against Hull Kingston Rovers.

== International career ==
In 2012, Percival was selected in the England Academy squad for their tour to Australia.

Percival was selected in England's 24-man squad for the 2016 Four Nations, and made his international début in a pre-tournament warm-up game against France.

In October 2017 he was selected in the England squad for the 2017 Rugby League World Cup. He made his only appearance of the tournament in the final group game against France, scoring a try in a 36–6 win.

In 2018 he was selected for England against France at the Leigh Sports Village.
