= Deon Cross =

English rugby league footballer

Personal information
- Full name: Deon Cross
- Born: 30 July 1996 (age 30) St Helens, Merseyside, England
- Height: 6 ft 2 in (1.88 m)
- Weight: 14 st 13 lb (95 kg)

Playing information
- Position: Centre, Wing
Club
Years	Team	Pld	T	G	FG	P
2018	Rochdale Hornets	27	11	0	0	0
2019	Barrow Raiders	30	14	0	0	56
2020–21	Widnes Vikings	30	24	0	0	96
2022–25	Salford Red Devils	92	32	0	0	128
2025–	St Helens	28	8	0	0	32
	Total	207	89	0	0	312
Representative
Years	Team	Pld	T	G	FG	P
2022–	England Knights	2	0	0	0	0
- Source: As of 12 August 2026

Deon Cross (born 30 July 1996) is a rugby league footballer who plays as a centre or winger for St Helens in the Super League.

He previously played for the Rochdale Hornets, Barrow Raiders and the Widnes Vikings in the Championship, featuring as a winger earlier in his career. he scored on his home debut for St. Helens in a 40-0 victory over the Catalan Dragons. He most recently scored the opening try in the derby match vs Wigan where the Saints lost 4-18

== Playing career ==
Deon Cross started out his career at his local junior club Blackbrook ARLFC in St.Helens before making a move to the St.Helens Scholarship programme. Once being released as a 16yr old Cross then returned to the amateur fold playing for the Blackbrook open age side.

Cross then went onto play for the Rochdale Hornets side in 2018 before a move to Barrow Raiders in 2019, then returning locally to play for the Widnes Vikings outfit for the 2020 season, where he scored a try in every appearance he played for the Vikings that season. In 2022, Cross achieved a Super League move to the Salford Red Devils.

=== Salford Red Devils ===
In February 2022 Cross made his Salford Super League début against the Castleford Tigers. In the 2023 Super League season, Cross played 27 matches for Salford as the club finished 7th on the table and missed the playoffs.

=== St Helens ===
On 25 April 2025, it was announced that Cross had joined St Helens R.F.C. on a two-year deal, at least until the end of the 2027 season. On 3 May 2025, Cross made his club debut for St Helens at the 2025 Magic Weekend against Leeds. On 15 May 2025, Cross made his home club debut for St Helens in their 40-0 victory over Catalans. Cross played 15 matches for St Helens in the 2026 Super League season as the club finished 7th on the table and missed the playoffs.
