= James Bell (rugby league) =

Scotland international rugby league footballer

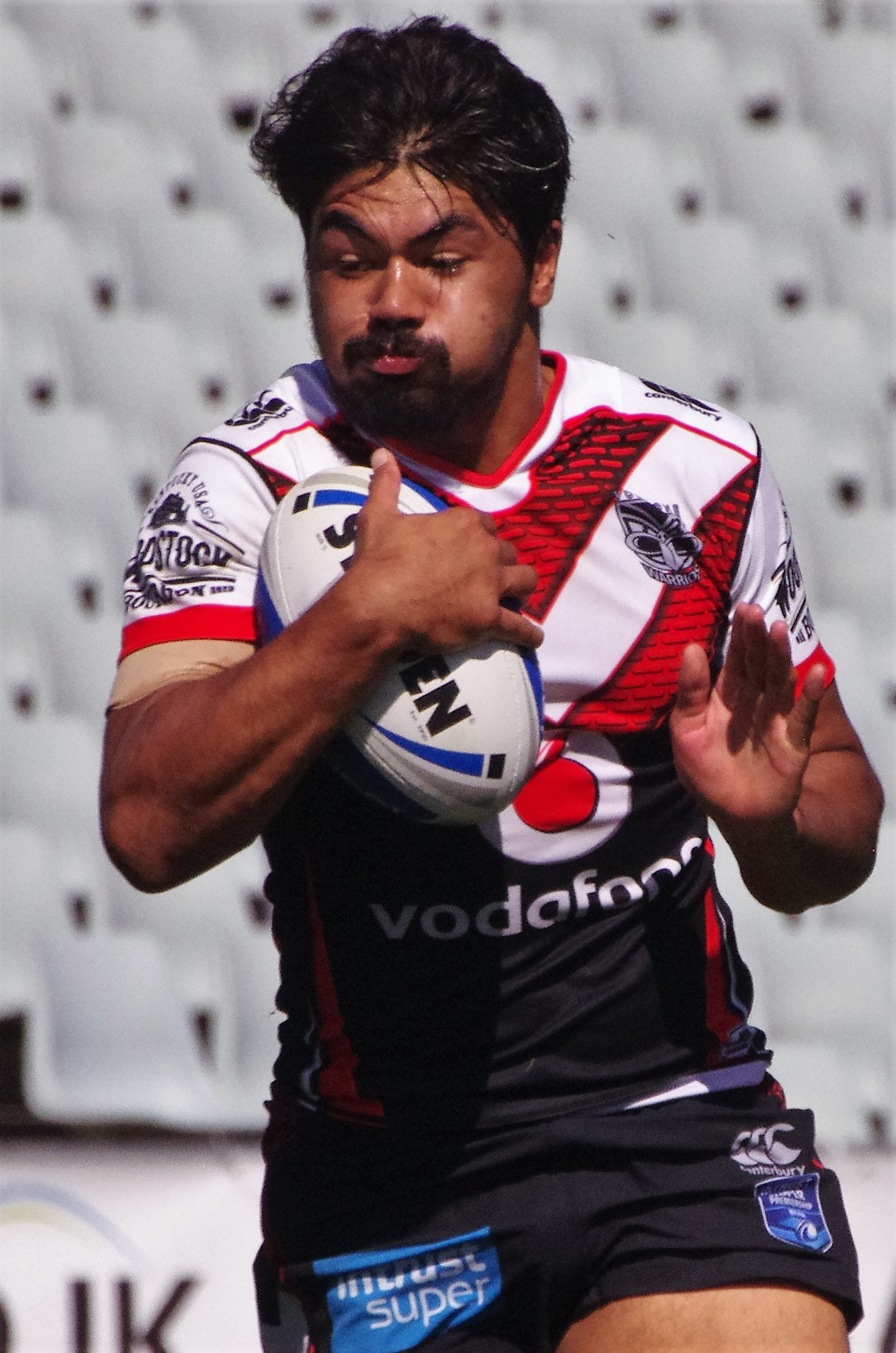

Personal information
- Full name: James Temuera Te Manawanui Bell
- Born: 2 May 1994 (age 32) Auckland, New Zealand
- Height: 5 ft 11 in (1.80 m)
- Weight: 15 st 4 lb (97 kg)

Playing information
- Position: Loose forward, Second-row, Hooker
Club
Years	Team	Pld	T	G	FG	P
2017–18	New Zealand Warriors	2	0	0	0	0
2019–20	Toulouse Olympique	26	9	0	0	36
2021	Leigh Centurions	20	1	0	0	4
2022–25	St Helens	84	10	0	0	40
2022(loan)	→ Leigh Centurions	2	0	0	0	0
2026	Hull FC	18	1	0	0	4
2027–	Bradford Bulls	0	0	0	0	0
	Total	152	21	0	0	84
Representative
Years	Team	Pld	T	G	FG	P
2017–	Scotland	9	1	0	0	4
- Source: As of 19 November 2026

James Temuera Te Manawanui Bell (born 2 May 1994) is a Scotland international rugby league footballer who plays as a loose forward and second-rower for Bradford Bulls in the Super League.

He previously played for the New Zealand Warriors in the NRL, the Leigh Centurions in the Super League, and Leigh and Toulouse Olympique in the Championship.

== Background ==
Bell was born in Auckland, New Zealand, and is of Scottish and Māori descent.

He played his junior rugby league for the Papakura Sea Eagles, before being signed by the New Zealand Warriors.

== Playing career ==
=== Early career ===
In 2014, Bell played for the New Zealand Warriors' NYC team. In October 2014, he played in the Warriors' 2014 NYC Grand Final win over the Brisbane Broncos. In 2015, he graduated to the Warriors' New South Wales Cup team and in 2016 he was named the side's man of the year. Also in 2016, he captained the New Zealand Māori rugby league team.

=== 2017 ===
Bell played in the 2017 NRL Auckland Nines.

After making over 50 appearances with the Warriors' reserve team, Bell made his NRL debut for the Warriors against the Cronulla-Sutherland Sharks in round 21 of the 2017 NRL season.

=== Leigh Centurions ===
On 5 November 2020 it was announced that Bell would join Leigh for the 2021 season.

=== St Helens R.F.C. ===
On 14 September 2021, it was reported that he had signed for St Helens R.F.C. in the Super League. Bell played 17 games for St Helens in the 2022 Super League season and featured in the clubs semi-final victory over Salford but he was not included in the grand final team which won their fourth successive title. On 18 February 2023, Bell played in St Helens 13–12 upset victory over Penrith in the 2023 World Club Challenge. Bell played 27 games for St Helens in the 2023 Super League season as the club finished third on the table. He played in St Helens narrow loss against the Catalans Dragons in the semi-final which stopped them reaching a fifth successive grand final. In round 11 of the 2024 Super League season, Bell scored two tries for St Helens in their 60–6 victory over Castleford. Bell played 24 matches for St Helens in the 2024 Super League season which saw the club finish sixth on the table. Bell played in St Helens golden point extra-time playoff loss against Warrington.

=== Hull FC ===
On 16 September 2025, it was announced that Bell would be departing St Helens at the end of the 2025 Super League season. On the same day, it was revealed Bell had signed a contract to join Hull F.C. starting in 2026.

On 7 November 2026 it was reported that he had left Hull FC by mutual consent.

=== Bradford Bulls ===
On 10 November 2026 it was reported that he had signed for Bradford Bulls in the Super League on a 2-year deal.

== International career ==
In October, Bell was named in the Scotland squad for the 2017 Rugby League World Cup.

Bell played all three matches for Scotland at the 2021 Rugby League World Cup where they finished bottom of their group.
