= RFL dual registration =

Dual registration within the RFL refers to an arrangement between clubs whereby a rugby league player within the Rugby Football League continued to be registered to their current club and was also registered to play for a club in a lower league. In was introduced for the 2013 season and discontinued at the start of the 2026 season.

The system was mostly aimed at young Super League players who were thought to be not quite ready to make the step up to first team duties but for whom first team match experience was likely to be beneficial for their development. This had also been extended to Championship teams dual registering with League 1 clubs.

Clubs in both the Super League and the Championships benefited from the new dual registration system which was introduced for the 2013 season. The system was intended to complement the existing player loan system.

The scheme was extended in 2024 to allow players of Championship and League One clubs to appear for NCL clubs.

In January 2026, the RFL confirmed the end of the dual-registration system and at the same time changing rules for player loans by reducing the minimum length to one week (previously it had been two weeks, reduced from month-long loans in 2021).

== Rules ==
- All players can be dual registered and the receiving club must be a club in a lower tier (i.e. Super League players must go to either the Championship or League 1, and Championship players must to either League 1 or NCL clubs, League One players can only go to NCL teams).
- A dual registered player will be eligible to play and train with both clubs in a format agreed between the clubs, subject to registration, salary cap and competition eligibility rules.
- The player is restricted to playing in one fixture per scheduled round of fixtures in any given week (for example, he would not be eligible to play for his Super League club on a Thursday and in a Championship fixture at the weekend).
- A receiving club will be limited to a total of five dual registered players per matchday squad.

== Clubs ==
Eight Super League clubs announced dual registration partnerships for the 2024 season.

Super League club	Dual registration club(s)	Ref.
Castleford Tigers	Batley Bulldogs	
Castleford Tigers	Newcastle Thunder	
Catalans Dragons	Toulouse Olympique	
Huddersfield Giants	Dewsbury Rams	
Hull Kingston Rovers	Featherstone Rovers	
Leeds Rhinos	Halifax Panthers	
St Helens	Swinton Lions	
Warrington Wolves	Widnes Vikings	
Wigan Warriors	Wakefield Trinity (-April)	
Wigan Warriors	Barrow Raiders (May-)	
Wigan Warriors	Midlands Hurricanes	

One Championship club announced a dual registration partnership with a League 1 club for the 2024 season.

Championship club	Dual registration club	Ref.
York Knights	Newcastle Thunder	
