= 2025 Warrington Wolves season =

English rugby league team season

Warrington Wolves 2025 season
- 2025 Super League season Rank: 8th
- Play-off result: Did not qualify
- Challenge Cup: Runners-up
- 2025 record: Wins: 14; draws: 0; losses: 18
- Points scored: For: 480; against: 641

Team information
- Chairman: Stuart Middleton
- Head Coach: Sam Burgess
- Captain: George Williams
- Stadium: Halliwell Jones Stadium
- Avg. attendance: 10,421
- High attendance: 12,503; Wigan Warriors, 8 August
- Low attendance: 8,625; Castleford Tigers, 30 May

Top scorers
- Tries: Jake Thewlis (12)
- Goals: Marc Sneyd (41)
- Points: Marc Sneyd (90)
| Home colours | Away colours |
| ← 2024 | List of seasons | 2026 → |

The 2025 season was Warrington Wolves' 30th consecutive season playing in England's top division of rugby league. They competed in the 2025 Super League season and the 2025 Challenge Cup.

== Preseason friendlies ==
| Date and time | Versus | H/A | Venue | Result | Score | Tries | Goals | Attendance | Report |
|---|---|---|---|---|---|---|---|---|---|
| 12 January; 15:00 (Note: James Saltonstall testimonial; match cancelled due to poor weather) | Halifax Panthers | A | The Shay | N/A | C–C | | | | |
| 17 January; 19:30 | Widnes Vikings | H | Halliwell Jones Stadium | L | 22–36 | Johnson (2), Russell, J. Thewlis | Leyland (2/2), Ratchford (1/2) | | |
| 1 February; 17:30 (Note: Toby King testimonial) | Leigh Leopards | H | Halliwell Jones Stadium | L | 12–20 | Ashton, J. Thewlis | Leyland (2/2) | | |

== Super League ==
On 9 July 2024, it was announced that Warrington would be part of the 2025 Rugby League Las Vegas event, playing their away match against Wigan Warriors at the Allegiant Stadium in Paradise, Nevada.

=== Fixtures ===
| Date and time | Round | Versus | H/A | Venue | Result | Score | Tries | Goals | Attendance | TV | Pos. | Report |
|---|---|---|---|---|---|---|---|---|---|---|---|---|
| 16 February; 15:00 | Round 1 | Huddersfield Giants | A | Kirklees Stadium | W | 20–12 | Lindop, Ashton, King, Dufty | Ratchford (1/2), Thewlis (1/2) | 5,873 | Sky Sports + | 3rd | |
| 21 February; 20:00 | Round 2 | Catalans Dragons | H | Halliwell Jones Stadium (Note: Stadium was renamed the 'Luke Littler Stadium' for this fixture) | W | 18–12 | King, Walker, Dufty | Thewlis (3/3) | 11,157 | Sky Sports Action | 3rd | |
| 1 March, 21:30 (GMT) | Round 3 (Rugby League Las Vegas) | Wigan Warriors | N | Allegiant Stadium | L | 24–48 | Lindop, Harrison, Dufty, Ashton | Thewlis (4/4) | 45,209 | Sky Sports Main Event | 6th | |
| 9 March; 13:00 | Round 4 | Wakefield Trinity | H | Halliwell Jones Stadium | L | 16–30 | Lindop, Johnson, Thewlis | Thewlis (2/3) | 10,024 | Sky Sports + | 8th | |
| 21 March; 20:00 | Round 5 | St Helens | A | Totally Wicked Stadium | W | 14–12 | Williams, Ashton | Thewlis (2/2 + 1 pen.) | 14,068 | Sky Sports Main Event | 7th | |
| 28 March; 20:00 | Round 6 (Note: 5,000th match of Super League rugby) | Leeds Rhinos | H | Halliwell Jones Stadium | W | 16–14 | Lindop, Ratchford, J. Thewlis | Sneyd (2/3) | 10,523 | Sky Sports Main Event | 5th | |
| 12 April; 17:30 | Round 7 | Hull F.C. | H | Halliwell Jones Stadium | L | 16–28 | Ashton (2), Williams, Thewlis | Sneyd (0/4) | 10,523 | Sky Sports + | 7th | |
| 19 April, 13:30 | Round 8 (Rivals Round) | Leigh Leopards | A | Leigh Sports Village | L | 14–18 | King, Ashton | Sneyd (2/2 + 1 pen.) | 9,267 | BBC One | 9th | |
| 24 April, 20:00 | Round 9 | St Helens | H | Halliwell Jones Stadium | W | 32–18 | Ashton (3), King, Tai, Dufty | Sneyd (2/3), Thewlis (2/3) | 10,214 | Sky Sports Action | 8th | |
| 4 May; 15:15 | Round 10 (Magic Weekend) | Wigan Warriors | N | St James' Park | L | 20–22 | J. Thewlis (2), Tai, Philbin | Ratchford (2/4) | 32,862 (Note: Attendance recorded across three fixtures.) | Sky Sports Action | 9th | |
| 18 May; 15:00 | Round 11 | Wakefield Trinity | A | Belle Vue | L | 10–40 | Lindop, Wrench | Sneyd (1/2) | 10,764 | Sky Sports + | 9th | |
| 23 May; 20:00 | Round 12 | Hull Kingston Rovers | H | Halliwell Jones Stadium | L | 12–31 | Russell, Thewlis | Thewlis (2/2) | 9,972 | Sky Sports Action | 9th | |
| 30 May; 20:00 | Round 13 | Castleford Tigers | H | Halliwell Jones Stadium | W | 34–24 | J. Thewlis, Thewlis, Tai, Lindop, Currie, Ratchford | Sneyd (4/5), Ratchford (1/1) | 8,625 | Sky Sports + | 8th | |
| 14 June; 17:30 | Round 14 | Leeds Rhinos | A | Headingley Rugby Stadium | L | 12–34 | Thewlis, Currie | Sneyd (2/2) | 14,306 | Sky Sports + | 8th | |
| 21 June; 15:00 | Round 15 | Huddersfield Giants | H | Halliwell Jones Stadium | L | 16–24 | Sneyd, King, J. Thewlis | Sneyd (2/3) | 9,964 | Sky Sports + | 8th | |
| 28 June; 17:30 | Round 16 | Hull F.C. | H | Halliwell Jones Stadium | W | 24–10 | Thewlis, J. Thewlis, Powell, Fitzgibbon | Sneyd (4/4) | 10,235 | Sky Sports + | 8th | |
| 4 July; 20:00 | Round 17 | Salford Red Devils | A | Salford Community Stadium | W | 24–12 | Dufty, Harrison, Thewlis, Ratchford | Sneyd (3/4 + 1 pen.) | | Sky Sports + | 8th | |
| 12 July; 18:00 (BST) | Round 18 | Catalans Dragons | A | Stade Gilbert Brutus | W | 24–20 | Gardner, Williams, Crowther, J. Thewlis | Thewlis (3/3), Sneyd (1/1) | 6,548 | Sky Sports + | 8th | |
| 20 July; 15:00 | Round 19 | Castleford Tigers | A | Wheldon Road | L | 14–20 | Stone, J. Thewlis, Ratchford | Sneyd (1/2), Irwin (0/1) | | Sky Sports + | 8th | |
| 1 August; 20:00 | Round 20 | Leigh Leopards | A | Leigh Sports Village | L | 16–20 | Dufty, J. Thewlis | Sneyd (1/2 + 3 pen.) | | Sky Sports + | 8th | |
| 8 August; 20:00 | Round 21 | Wigan Warriors | H | Halliwell Jones Stadium | L | 18–24 | Thewlis, Williams, J. Thewlis | Sneyd (2/3 + 1 pen.) | 12,503 | Sky Sports Action | 8th | |
| 14 August; 20:00 | Round 22 | Catalans Dragons | H | Halliwell Jones Stadium | W | 30–22 | J. Thewlis (2), Gardner, Stone, Thewlis | Sneyd (5/5) | 10,740 | Sky Sports + | 8th | |
| 23 August; 15:00 | Round 23 | Huddersfield Giants | A | Kirklees Stadium | L | 10–23 | Wrench, King | Sneyd (1/2) | 3,941 | Sky Sports + | 8th | |
| 29 August; 20:00 | Round 24 | Salford Red Devils | H | Halliwell Jones Stadium | L | 12–25 | Dufty, J. Thewlis | Thewlis (2/2) | | Sky Sports + | 8th | |
| 6 September; 15:00 | Round 25 | Leigh Leopards | H | Halliwell Jones Stadium | L | 12–34 | King, Thewlis | Ratchford (2/2) | 11,060 | Sky Sports + | 8th | |
| 13 September; 17:30 | Round 26 | Hull F.C. | A | MKM Stadium | L | 2–12 | | Sneyd (1 pen.) | 10,494 | Sky Sports + | 8th | |
| 18 September; 20:00 | Round 27 | Hull Kingston Rovers | A | Craven Park | L | 20–28 | Thewlis (2), Stone, Holroyd | Sneyd (2/4) | | Sky Sports Main Event | 8th | |

=== Table ===
| Pos | Team | Pld | W | D | L | PF | PA | PD | Pts | Qualification |
|---|---|---|---|---|---|---|---|---|---|---|
| 1 | Hull Kingston Rovers (L, C) | 27 | 22 | 0 | 5 | 786 | 292 | +494 | 44 | Advance to Semi-finals |
| 2 | Wigan Warriors | 27 | 21 | 0 | 6 | 794 | 333 | +461 | 42 | Advance to Semi-finals |
| 3 | Leigh Leopards | 27 | 19 | 1 | 7 | 619 | 452 | +167 | 39 | Advance to Eliminators |
| 4 | Leeds Rhinos | 27 | 18 | 0 | 9 | 610 | 310 | +300 | 36 | Advance to Eliminators |
| 5 | St Helens | 27 | 17 | 0 | 10 | 677 | 314 | +363 | 34 | Advance to Eliminators |
| 6 | Wakefield Trinity (Note: Salford forfeited their game against Wakefield. Under RFL operational rules, the game is recorded as a 48–0 victory for Wakefield, and converse loss for Salford, with the points scored and conceded applying to both teams.) | 27 | 15 | 0 | 12 | 688 | 458 | +230 | 30 | Advance to Eliminators |
| 7 | Hull FC | 27 | 13 | 1 | 13 | 539 | 461 | +78 | 27 | |
| 8 | Warrington Wolves | 27 | 10 | 0 | 17 | 480 | 641 | −161 | 20 | |
| 9 | Catalans Dragons | 27 | 10 | 0 | 17 | 425 | 652 | −227 | 20 | |
| 10 | Huddersfield Giants | 27 | 7 | 0 | 20 | 347 | 738 | −391 | 14 | |
| 11 | Castleford Tigers | 27 | 6 | 0 | 21 | 396 | 815 | −419 | 12 | |
| 12 | Salford Red Devils (R) | 27 | 3 | 0 | 24 | 234 | 1129 | −895 | 4 (Note: On 22 September 2025, Salford Red Devils were deducted two points breaching "a number of RFL operational rules" surrounding their team selection for their Round 1 fixture against St Helens on 15 February 2025.) | Relegated to Championship |

(C) Champions; (L) League Leaders' Shield Winners; (R) Relegated

== Challenge Cup ==
On 25 June 2024, the RFL announced a change to the Challenge Cup format, totalling 7 rounds compared to the previous 9, with Super League teams entering to play away from home at round 3.

Warrington Wolves were first drawn on 14 January to play Whitehaven R.L.F.C. away in Round 3 following Whitehaven's subsequent Round 2 24–12 victory against the Swinton Lions on 25 January. Following their victory against Whitehaven, Warrington beat the Widnes Vikings 26–16 away on 15 March, qualifying them for the quarter-finals against local rivals St Helens.

After winning 20–12 in the quarter-final, Warrington visited the Totally Wicked Stadium to play the Leigh Leopards in the semi-finals on 11 May. A 21–14 victory over Leigh qualified the Warrington Wolves to play in the 2025 Challenge Cup final at Wembley Stadium against 2023 final runners-up Hull Kingston Rovers. Following a closely-contended match, however, Warrington lost the final 8-6.

| Date and time | Round | Versus | H/A | Venue | Result | Score | Tries | Goals | Attendance | TV | Report |
|---|---|---|---|---|---|---|---|---|---|---|---|
| 8 February; 15:00 | Round 3 | Whitehaven R.L.F.C. | A | Recreation Ground | W | 44–4 | Walker (2), Leyland, J. Thewlis (2), Taylor-Wray (2) | Ratchford (3/4), Thewlis (3/4) | 3,980 | Not televised | |
| 15 March; 17:00 | Round 4 | Widnes Vikings | A | Halton Stadium | W | 26–16 | Holroyd, Thewlis, Wood, Currie, Musgrove | Ratchford (2/4), Thewlis (1/1) | 7,011 | Not televised | |
| 6 April; 14:30 | Quarter-finals | St Helens | H | Halliwell Jones Stadium | W | 20–12 | Dufty, Currie, Williams | Sneyd (3/3 + 1 pen.) | 10,114 | BBC Two | |
| 11 May; 16:15 | Semi-finals | Leigh Leopards | N | Totally Wicked Stadium | W | 21–14 | Tai, Vaughan, King | Sneyd (3/3 + 1 pen.); Drop-goals: Sneyd | 11,722 | BBC Two | |
| 7 June; 15:00 | Final | Hull Kingston Rovers | N | Wembley Stadium | L | 6–8 | Thewlis | Sneyd (1/1) | 63,278 | BBC One | |

== Transfers ==
=== Gains ===
| Player | Club | Contract | Date |
|---|---|---|---|
| (England) Oli Leyland | London Broncos | 2 Years | October 2024 |
| (Papua New Guinea) Daniel Russell | St George Illawarra Dragons | 2 Years | October 2024 |
| (England) Alfie Johnson | Leeds Rhinos | 2 Years | October 2024 |
| (England) Marc Sneyd | Salford Red Devils | 1 1/2 years | March 2025 |

==== Loans in ====
| Player | Club | Loan period | Date |
|---|---|---|---|
| (Malta) Sam Stone | Salford Red Devils | End of season | June 2025 |
| (Australia) Ryan Matterson | Parramatta Eels | End of season | July 2025 |

=== Losses ===
| Player | Club | Contract | Date |
|---|---|---|---|
| (England) Matty Nicholson | Canberra Raiders | 3 Years | July 2024 |
| (Wales) Gil Dudson | Oldham R.L.F.C. | 2 Years | September 2024 |
| (Scotland) Matty Russell | Wakefield Trinity | 1 Year | September 2024 |
| (England) John Bateman | Wests Tigers | End of loan | October 2024 |
| (England) Wesley Bruines | TBC | | October 2024 |
| (England) Joe Bullock | Salford Red Devils | 2 Years | October 2024 |
| (England) Josh Drinkwater | Oldham R.L.F.C. | 1 Year | November 2024 |
| (Samoa) Zane Musgrove | Oldham R.L.F.C. | 1 1/2 Years (Note: Following his contract release by Warrington due to a 'internal disciplinary issue', Musgrove was handed an eight-game ban by the RFL on 25 June for the use of unacceptable language during the Challenge Cup semi-final fixture against Leigh.) | May 2025 |
| (England) Connor Wrench | N/A | Retirement | August 2025 |

==== Loans out ====
| Player | Club | Loan period | Date |
|---|---|---|---|
| (England) Alfie Johnson | Halifax Panthers | End of season | May 2025 |
| (Papua New Guinea) Daniel Russell | Salford Red Devils | End of season | June 2025 |
| (England) Tom Whitehead | Salford Red Devils | Rolling monthly | June 2025 |

== Squad ==
2025 Warrington Wolves squad
| First team squad | | | Coaching staff |
|---|---|---|---|
| 1 (Australia) Matt Dufty – FB; 2 (England) Josh Thewlis – WG, FB; 3 (England) Toby King – CE; 4 (Papua New Guinea) Rodrick Tai – CE; 5 (England) Matty Ashton – WG; 6 (England) George Williams (c) – SO, SH; 7 (England) Leon Hayes – SH, HK; 8 (England) James Harrison – LF, SR, PR; 9 (England) Danny Walker – HK; 10 (Australia) Paul Vaughan – PR; 11 (England) Ben Currie – SR | 12 (Australia) Lachlan Fitzgibbon – SR; 13 (Australia) Luke Yates – LF, PR; 14 (England) Sam Powell – HK; 15 (England) Joe Philbin – LF, SR, PR; 17 (England) Jordan Crowther – LF, PR, HK; 18 (England) Oli Leyland – SO, SH, FB; 19 (England) Stefan Ratchford – FB, SO, CE, SH; 21 (England) Adam Holroyd – SR; 23 (England) Cai Taylor-Wray – FB; 24 (England) Max Wood – PR; 25 (England) Lucas Green – PR | 27 (Wales) Luke Thomas – PR; 28 (England) Jake Thewlis – WG; 29 (England) Zac Bardsley-Rowe – CE; 30 (Nigeria) Daniel Okoro – PR, SR; 33 (England) Arron Lindop – CE, WG; 35 (England) Marc Sneyd – SH, SO (gk); 38 (Malta) Sam Stone – SR; 40 (Australia) Ryan Matterson – SR, LF | Head coach: (England) Sam Burgess; Assistant coaches: (Ireland) Richard Marshall; (England) Martin Gleeson; Legend: (c) Captain(s); (vc) Vice-captain(s); (red card) = suspended; = injured; (gk) = Goal kicker; Updated: 18 September 2025; Source(s): 2025 squad numbers |
