= 2023 Super League season =

Rugby league season 2023

Super League XXVIII
- League: Super League
- Duration: 27 rounds
- Teams: 12
- Matches played: 167
- Points scored: 6,464
- Highest attendance: 24,275; Wigan Warriors Vs St Helens (7 April)
- Lowest attendance: 3,348; Wakefield Trinity Vs Catalans Dragons (8 September)
- Average attendance: 9,256
- Total attendance: 1,545,894
- Broadcast partners: Sky Sports; Channel 4 BBC Sport (highlights); Fox League; Fox Soccer Plus; Sport Klub beIN Sports

2023 season
- Champions: Wigan Warriors; 6th Super League title 23rd British title
- League Leaders Shield: Wigan Warriors
- Runners-up: Catalans Dragons
- Biggest home win: Catalans Dragons 61–0 Leeds Rhinos (16 September)
- Biggest away win: Leeds Rhinos 0–50 Wigan Warriors (9 September)
- Man of Steel: (Australia) Bevan French
- Top point-scorer(s): (England) Harry Smith (218)
- Top try-scorer(s): (Lebanon) Abbas Miski (28)

Promotion and relegation
- Promoted from Championship: London Broncos
- Relegated to Championship: Wakefield Trinity

Super League XXVIII, known as the 2023 Betfred Super League for sponsorship reasons, was the 28th season of the Super League and 129th season of rugby league in Great Britain.

The season began on 16 February 2023, and ended with the Grand Final on 14 October 2023.

St Helens were the reigning champions after winning their 4th successive title, beating Leeds Rhinos in the 2022 Grand Final. They were eliminated in the semi final, losing 6–12 to Catalans Dragons.

Leigh Leopards were immediately promoted back to Super League, after they beat Batley Bulldogs 44–12 in the 2022 Championship Grand Final. Wakefield Trinity were relegated from Super League after 24 years.

Wigan Warriors defeated Catalans, 10–2 in the Grand Final, to win their 6th super league title, and 23rd overall.

== Teams ==
The league comprises 12 teams. The regular season comprises 27 rounds.

Locations of the 2023 Super League teams in Northern England
Locations of Super League XXVIII teams in France

Legend
Reigning Champions
Previous season Runners-Up
Previous season League Leaders
Promoted

Team	2022 position	Stadium	Capacity	City/Town
Castleford Tigers	7th	Wheldon Road	12,000	Castleford, West Yorkshire
Catalans Dragons	4th (Eliminated in QF stage)	Stade Gilbert Brutus	13,000	Perpignan, Pyrénées-Orientales, France
Huddersfield Giants	3rd (Eliminated in Elim Final)	John Smith's Stadium	24,121	Huddersfield, West Yorkshire
Hull FC	9th	MKM Stadium	25,400	Kingston upon Hull, East Riding of Yorkshire
Hull Kingston Rovers	8th	Craven Park	12,225	Kingston upon Hull, East Riding of Yorkshire
Leeds Rhinos	5th (Runners up)	Headingley Rugby Stadium	21,062	Leeds, West Yorkshire
Leigh Leopards	1st (promoted)	Leigh Sports Village	12,000	Leigh, Greater Manchester
Salford Red Devils	6th (Eliminated in SF)	AJ Bell Stadium	12,000	Salford, Greater Manchester
St Helens	1st (Grand Final winners)	Totally Wicked Stadium	18,000	St Helens, Merseyside
Wakefield Trinity	10th	Belle Vue	9,333	Wakefield, West Yorkshire
Warrington Wolves	11th	Halliwell Jones Stadium	15,200	Warrington, Cheshire
Wigan Warriors	2nd (Eliminated in SF)	DW Stadium	25,133	Wigan, Greater Manchester

== Results ==
=== Matches decided by golden point ===
If a match ends in a draw after 80 minutes, then a further 10 minutes of golden point extra time is played, to determine a winner (five minutes each way). The first team to score either a try, penalty goal or drop goal during this period, will win the match. However, if there are no further scores during the additional 10 minutes period, then the match will end in a draw.

==== Game 1 (Salford Red Devils v Wakefield Trinity) ====
The round 5 game between Salford Red Devils and Wakefield Trinity on 19 March 2023, finished 13–all after 80 minutes. The game then went to extra time, which saw numerous drop goal attempts by both teams. Salford won the match 14–13 with a drop goal from Marc Sneyd.

==== Game 2 (Hull Kingston Rovers v Wigan Warriors) ====
The round 13 game between Hull Kingston Rovers & Wigan Warriors on 25 May 2023, finished 22–all after 80 minutes, with Abbas Miski scoring a last gasp try on the final hooter, to level the match. The game then went to extra time. The first chance came to Mikey Lewis, as he kicked a drop goal, but his effort hit the post. With less than 20 seconds of the first 5 minutes remaining, Liam Farrell scored the match winning try, to win the game 26–22.

==== Game 3 (Leeds Rhinos v St Helens) ====
The round 13 game between Leeds Rhinos and St Helens on 26 May 2023, finished 12-all after 80 minutes. The match then went to golden point, with numerous drop goal attempts from both sides. With 26 seconds of the match remaining, Lewis Dodd kicked a drop goal for Saints, to win the match 13–12.

==== Game 4 (Wakefield Trinity v Wigan Warriors) ====
The round 18 game between Wakefield Trinity and Wigan Warriors on 7 July 2023, finished 26–all after 80 minutes. Wigan almost won the game 26–24, but were penalised for an off the ball tackle with seconds of the match remaining. Will Dagger kicked a penalty goal on the hooter, to send the game to golden point. The only chance of the game went to Wakefield, with Dagger kicking a drop goal to win the match for Wakefield, 27–26.

==== Game 5 (Leeds Rhinos v Hull KR) ====
The round 19 game between Leeds Rhinos and Hull KR on 14 July 2023, finished 18–all after 80 minutes. The first chance of the game came for Hull KR, as Brad Schneider attempted a drop goal attempt, but his effort fell just short. but as Leeds got the ball back, they knocked on from the kick off, and this time, debutant Schneider, kicked the winning DG, to condemn Leeds to their 2nd golden point defeat of the season at Headingley.

==== Game 6 (Wigan Warriors v Hull FC) ====
The Round 22 game between Wigan Warriors and Hull FC on 18 August 2023, finished 12–all after 80 minutes, as Jake Wardle scored a last minute try for Wigan, to send the game to extra time. The first attempt at a drop goal, came from Wigan's Harry Smith, but his effort was wide. Hull then had a chance of their own, but Sam Powell charged the kick down, and the first period ended with no scores. With less than 2 minutes of the game remaining, Harry Smith then kicked a drop goal from 45 meters out, to win the game for Wigan 13–12.

==== Game 7 (Salford Red Devils v Warrington Wolves) ====
The Round 25 game between Salford Red Devils and Warrington Wolves on 10 September 2023, finished 20–all after 80 minutes, as Marc Sneyd kicked a late penalty goal for Salford, to send the game to extra time. The only attempt at a drop goal came from Marc Sneyd, but his effort hit the post and bounced back into play. With less than 2 minutes of the first period remaining, Joe Burgess made a break for the line, before passing the ball to Sam Stone to score the winning try.

==== Game 8 (Leigh Leopards v Wakefield Trinity) ====
The Round 26 game between Leigh Leopards and Wakefield Trinity on 15 September 2023, finished 19–all after 80 minutes, as Luke Gale kicked a drop goal for Wakefield with 15 seconds of the game remaining, to send the game to extra time. Both sides attempted drop goals, but neither team could score any points during the first 5 minutes. In the 9th minute, Gareth O'Brien kicked the winning drop goal for Leigh, to win the match 20-19, and confirm Wakefield's relegation.

== Table ==
Pos	Team	Pld	W	D	L	PF	PA	PD	Pts	Qualification
1	Wigan Warriors (L, C)	27	20	0	7	722	360	+362	40	Qualification to Semi-finals
2	Catalans Dragons	27	20	0	7	722	420	+302	40	Qualification to Semi-finals
3	St. Helens	27	20	0	7	613	366	+247	40	Qualification to Eliminators
4	Hull Kingston Rovers	27	16	0	11	589	498	+91	32	Qualification to Eliminators
5	Leigh Leopards	27	16	0	11	585	508	+77	32	Qualification to Eliminators
6	Warrington Wolves	27	14	0	13	597	512	+85	28	Qualification to Eliminators
7	Salford Red Devils	27	13	0	14	494	512	−18	26	
8	Leeds Rhinos	27	12	0	15	535	534	+1	24	
9	Huddersfield Giants	27	11	0	16	473	552	−79	22	
10	Hull FC	27	10	0	17	476	654	−178	20	
11	Castleford Tigers	27	6	0	21	323	774	−451	12	
12	Wakefield Trinity (R)	27	4	0	23	303	742	−439	8	Relegation to Championship

Source: Super League
(C) Champions; (L) League Leaders' Shield Winners; (R) Relegated

== Play-offs ==
=== Team bracket ===
Eliminators
4	Hull KR	20
5	Leigh	6
3	St Helens	16
6	Warrington	8

Semi-finals
2	Catalans	12
3	St Helens	6
1	Wigan	42
4	Hull KR	12

Grand Final
1	Wigan	10
2	Catalans	2

=== Week 1: Eliminators ===
29 September 2023
20:00 BST (UTC+01)

Hull KR	20–6	Leigh Leopards
Try: Walker 33'; Hall 38'; Luckley 42'; Con: Schneider; 34', 39'; Pen: Schneider; 22', 76'	Report	Try: Charnley 57'; Con: Reynolds 8'

Sewell Group Craven Park
Referee: Jack Smith

30 September 2023
12:45 BST (UTC+01)

St Helens	16–8	Warrington Wolves
Try: Dodd 25'; Walmsley (yellow card) 45'; Makinson 57'; Con: Percival; 26', 58'; Pen: Percival; 37', 73'	Report	Try: Wrench 43'; Bullock (yellow card) 60'; Con: Ratchford 44'; Pen: Ratchford 53'

Totally Wicked Stadium
Attendance: 13,801
Referee: Ben Thaler

=== Week 2: Semi-finals ===
6 October 2023
20:00 BST (UTC+01)

Catalans Dragons	12–6	St Helens
Try: Tomkins 79'; Con: Keighran 80'; Pen: Keighran; 29', 65', 73'	Report	Try: Hopoate 50'; Con: Percival 51'; Lees (yellow card) 72'

Stade Gilbert Brutus
Attendance: 11,530
Referee: Chris Kendall

7 October 2023
12:45 BST (UTC+01)

Wigan Warriors	42–12	Hull KR
Try: Marshall 2', 11', 43'; Field 5',54'; King 47'; Miski 56'; Con: Smith 3', 6', 12', 44', 48', 55', 57'		Try: Minchella 24'; Litten 77'; Con: Schneider; 25', 78'

DW Stadium
Attendance: 15,162
Referee: Liam Moore

=== Week 3: Grand Final ===
14 October 2023
18:00 BST (UTC+01)

Wigan Warriors	10–2	Catalans Dragons
Try: Marshall 53'; Con: Smith (1/1) 54'; Pen: Smith (2/2); 25', 64'	Report	Pen: Keighran 36'; Keighran (yellow card) 19'; Davies (yellow card) 44'

Old Trafford
Attendance: 58,137
Referee: Liam Moore

== Player statistics ==
=== Top try scorers ===
As of 11 October 2023

	Winner(s)	Club	Tries
1	(Lebanon) Abbas Miski	Wigan Warriors	28
2	(England) Tom Johnstone	Catalans Dragons	27
3	(England) Josh Charnley	Leigh Leopards	26
4	(England) Tommy Makinson	St Helens	22
5	(England) Liam Marshall	Wigan Warriors	20
6	(England) Adam Swift	Hull FC	19
7	(England) Matty Ashton	Warrington Wolves	18
8	(Australia) Bevan French	Wigan Warriors	17
9	(Australia) Jai Field	Wigan Warriors	16

=== Top goal scorers ===
As of 11 October 2023

Player	Club	Goals	Missed Goals	Drop Goals	Goal Percentage %
(England) Harry Smith	Wigan Warriors	94	52	2	62%

=== Top points scorers ===
As of 11 October 2023

Rank	Player	Club	Points
1	(England) Harry Smith	Wigan Warriors	206
2	(England) Stefan Ratchford	Warrington Wolves	200
3	(Papua New Guinea) Rhyse Martin	Leeds Rhinos	194
4	(Australia) Adam Keighran	Catalans Dragons	192
5	(England) Marc Sneyd	Salford Red Devils	184
6	(England) Ben Reynolds	Leigh Leopards	170
7	(England) Tommy Makinson	St Helens	146
8	(England) Mark Percival	St Helens	142
9	(Australia) Jake Clifford	Hull FC	124
10	(Lebanon) Abbas Miski	Wigan Warriors	112

== End-of-season awards ==
The end of season awards took place on Tuesday 10 October. The winners were:

- Steve Prescott Man of Steel: (Australia) Bevan French ( Wigan Warriors)
- Coach of the Year: (Papua New Guinea) Adrian Lam ( Leigh Leopards)
- Young Player of the Year: (England) Josh Thewlis: ( Warrington Wolves)
- Spirit of Super League Award:

The Burrow Family

- Top tackler: (England) Luke Yates: ( Huddersfield Giants) (1,027 tackles)
- Top metre-maker: (Australia) Tom Amone: ( Leigh Leopards)
  (3,467 metres)
- Top try scorer: (Lebanon) Abbas Miski ( Wigan Warriors)
  (28 tries)
- Top try assists: (Australia) Bevan French ( Wigan Warriors)
  (30 try assists)
- Top goal-kicker: (England) Stefan Ratchford ( Warrington Wolves)
  (96 goals)
- Top points scorer: Stefan Ratchford ( Warrington Wolves)
  (200 points)

== Discipline ==
=== (red card) Red cards ===
As of 23 September 2023

Rank	Player	Club	Red cards
1	(England) James Greenwood	Huddersfield Giants	1
1	(England) James McDonnell	Leeds Rhinos	1
1	(England) Ben Reynolds	Leigh Leopards	1
1	(Tonga) Konrad Hurrell	St Helens	1
1	(New Zealand) Kevin Proctor	Wakefield Trinity	1
1	(France) Hugo Salabio	Wakefield Trinity	1
1	(Wales) Gil Dudson	Warrington Wolves	1

=== (yellow card) Yellow cards ===
As of 23 September 2023

Rank	Player	Club	Yellow cards
1	(Samoa) Sam Lisone	Leeds Rhinos	3
2	(Tonga) Manu Ma'u	Catalans Dragons	2
2	(Australia) Ligi Sao	Hull FC	2
2	(England) Harry Newman	Leeds Rhinos	2
2	(Scotland) Ryan Brierley	Salford Red Devils	2
2	(England) Deon Cross	Salford Red Devils	2
2	(England) Marc Sneyd	Salford Red Devils	2
2	(Fiji) King Vuniyayawa	Salford Red Devils	2
2	(England) Matty Lees	St Helens	2
2	(Australia) Sione Mata'utia	St Helens	2
2	(Australia) Sam Kasiano	Warrington Wolves	2

== Attendances ==
=== Club attendances ===
As of 30 September 2023

Club	Home Games	Total	Average	Highest	Lowest
Castleford Tigers	13	93,237	7,172	10,062	5,788
Catalans Dragons	13	117,808	9,053	10,786	6,933
Huddersfield Giants	13	68,086	5,237	7,737	4,070
Hull FC	13	160,617	12,355	20,985	9,937
Hull KR	14	114,010 (Note: based on the average attendance given by KR, the total attendance adds up to 114,000 (roughly))	8,770	(Note: The Hull Derby on 9 July was recorded as a sellout, but no attendance was given) 12,225	7,250
Leeds Rhinos	13	164,354	13,696	16,140	11,717
Leigh Leopards	13	94,303	7,254	10,308	5,423
Salford Red Devils	13	64,603	5,383	7,854	3,836
St Helens	14	179,979	12,782	17,088	10,304
Wakefield Trinity	13	51,443	4,287	4,710	3,348
Warrington Wolves	13	141,575	10,890	15,026	8,981
Wigan Warriors	13	175,462	13,497	24,275	11,451

=== Top 10 attendances ===
As of 30 September 2023

Rank	Home team	Away team	Stadium	Attendance
1	Magic Weekend: Day 1		St James' Park	36,943
2	Magic Weekend: Day 2		St James' Park	26,326
3	Wigan Warriors	St Helens	DW Stadium	24,275
4	Hull FC	Hull KR	MKM Stadium	20,985
5	St Helens	Wigan Warriors	Totally Wicked Stadium	17,088
6	Leeds Rhinos	Hull FC	Headingley Stadium	16,140
7	Hull FC	Castleford Tigers	MKM Stadium	15,383
8	Wigan Warriors	Leigh Leopards	DW Stadium	15,377
9	Leeds Rhinos	Warrington Wolves	Headingley	15,166
10	St Helens	Leeds	Totally Wicked Stadium	15,148

== Broadcasting ==
Round	Match	Date & Time	Broadcast method
1	Warrington Wolves v Leeds Rhinos	16 February 2023, 20:00	Sky Sports
1	Leigh Leopards v Salford Red Devils	17 February 2023, 20:00	Sky Sports
1	Hull KR v Wigan Warriors	18 February 2023, 13:00	Channel 4
2	Salford Red Devils v Hull KR	23 February 2023, 20:00	Sky Sports
2	Leeds Rhinos v Hull FC	24 February 2023, 20:00	Sky Sports
2	Castleford Tigers v St Helens	26 February 2023, 13:00	Channel 4
3	Warrington Wolves v Salford Red Devils	2 March 2023, 19:45	Sky Sports
3	St Helens v Leeds Rhinos	3 March 2023, 20:00	Sky Sports
4	Wigan Warriors v Catalans Dragons	9 March 2023, 20:00	Sky Sports
4	Huddersfield Giants v Castleford Tigers	10 March 2023, 20:00	Sky Sports
5	Castleford Tigers v Leeds Rhinos	16 March 2023, 20:00	Sky Sports
5	St Helens v Hull FC	17 March 2023, 20:00	Sky Sports
6	Huddersfield Giants v St Helens	23 March 2023, 20:00	Sky Sports
6	Wigan Warriors v Salford Red Devils	24 March 2023, 20:00	Sky Sports
6	Leeds Rhinos v Catalans Dragons	25 March 2023, 13:00	Channel 4
7	Leigh Leopards v Wigan Warriors	30 March 2023, 20:00	Sky Sports
7	Hull KR v Leeds Rhinos	31 March 2023, 20:00	Sky Sports
7	Warrington Wolves v Hull FC	1 April 2023, 13:00	Channel 4
8 (Rivals Round)	Castleford Tigers v Wakefield Trinity	6 April 2023, 20:00	Sky Sports
8 (Rivals Round)	Hull FC v Hull KR	7 April 2023, 12:30	Sky Sports
8 (Rivals Round)	Wigan Warriors v St Helens	7 April 2023, 15:00	Sky Sports
8 (Rivals Round)	Leigh Leopards v Salford Red Devils	8 April 2023, 14:30	Sky Sports
8 (Rivals Round)	Catalans Dragons v Warrington Wolves	8 April 2023, 16:00	Sky Sports
8 (Rivals Round)	Leeds Rhinos v Huddersfield Giants	9 April 2023, 18:00	Sky Sports
9	Salford Red Devils v Castleford Tigers	13 April 2023, 20:00	Sky Sports
9	Warrington Wolves v Wigan Warriors	14 April 2023, 20:00	Sky Sports
10	St Helens v Warrington Wolves	20 April 2023, 20:00	Sky Sports
10	Castleford Tigers v Hull KR	21 April 2023, 20:00	Sky Sports
11	Hull FC v Wigan Warriors	4 May 2023, 20:00	Sky Sports
11	Catalans Dragons v St Helens	5 May 2023, 19:45	Sky Sports
12	Wakefield Trinity v Hull FC	11 May 2023, 20:00	Sky Sports
12	Wigan Warriors v Leeds Rhinos	12 May 2023, 20:00	Sky Sports
12	St Helens v Salford Red Devils	13 May 2023, 13:00	Channel 4
13	Hull KR v Wigan Warriors	25 May 2023, 20:00	Sky Sports
13	Leeds Rhinos v St Helens	26 May 2023, 20:00	Sky Sports
14 (Magic Weekend)	Salford Red Devils v Hull KR	3 June 2023, 13:30	Sky Sports
14 (Magic Weekend)	Wigan Warriors v Catalans Dragons	3 June 2023, 15:45	Sky Sports
14 (Magic Weekend)	Leeds Rhinos v Castleford Tigers	3 June 2023, 18:00	Sky Sports
14 (Magic Weekend)	Wakefield Trinity v Leigh Leopards	4 June 2023, 12:00	Sky Sports
14 (Magic Weekend)	St Helens v Huddersfield Giants	4 June 2023, 14:15	Sky Sports
14 (Magic Weekend)	Hull FC v Warrington Wolves	4 June 2023, 16:30	Sky Sports
15	St Helens v Wigan Warriors	9 June 2023, 20:00	Sky Sports
15	Warrington Wolves v Huddersfield Giants	10 June 2023, 17:00	Sky Sports
16	Hull FC v St Helens	22 June 2023, 20:00	Sky Sports
16	Leeds Rhinos v Huddersfield Giants	23 June 2023, 20:00	Sky Sports
17	Warrington Wolves v Leeds Rhinos	29 June 2023, 20:00	Sky Sports
17	Leigh Leopards v Hull KR	30 June 2023, 20:00	Sky Sports
18	Warrington Wolves v St Helens	7 July 2023, 20:00	Sky Sports
18	Hull KR v Hull FC	9 July 2023, 12:00	Sky Sports
19	St Helens v Catalans Dragons	13 July 2023, 20:00	Sky Sports
19	Wigan Warriors v Warrington Wolves	14 July 2023, 20:00	Sky Sports
20	Huddersfield Giants v Hull FC	27 July 2023, 20:00	Sky Sports
20	St Helens v Leeds Rhinos	28 July 2023, 20:00	Sky Sports
20	Wigan Warriors v Leigh Leopards	29 July 2023, 13:00	Channel 4
21	Warrington Wolves v Catalans Dragons	4 August 2023, 20:00	Sky Sports
21	Leeds Rhinos v Leigh Leopards	6 August 2023, 15:00	Sky Sports
22	Wakefield Trinity v Castleford Tigers	18 August 2023, 20:00	Sky Sports
22	Leigh Leopards v Catalans Dragons	19 August 2023, 15:00	Sky Sports
22	Leeds Rhinos v Warrington Wolves	20 August 2023, 15:00	OurLeague
23	Hull KR v Leigh Leopards	25 August 2023, 20:00	Sky Sports
23	Catalans Dragons v Wigan Warriors	26 August 2023, 18:00	Sky Sports
24	Wigan Warriors v Salford Red Devils	1 September 2023, 20:00	Sky Sports
24	Warrington Wolves v Castleford Tigers	2 September 2023, 15:00	Sky Sports
25	St Helens v Leigh Leopards	8 September 2023, 20:00	Sky Sports
25	Leeds Rhinos v Wigan Warriors	9 September 2023, 14:45	Sky Sports
25	Salford Red Devils v Warrington Wolves	10 September 2023, 12:45	Sky Sports
26	Warrington Wolves v St Helens	15 September 2023, 20:00	Sky Sports
26	Catalans Dragons v Leeds Rhinos	16 September 2023, 17:00	Sky Sports
26	Hull KR v Salford Red Devils	16 September 2023, 19:30	Sky Sports
27	Leigh Leopards v Wigan Warriors	22 September 2023, 20:00	Sky Sports
Elim 1	Hull KR v Leigh Leopards	29 September 2023, 20:00	Sky Sports
Elim 2	St Helens v Warrington Wolves	30 September 2023, 12:45	Sky Sports & Channel 4
Semi Final 1	Catalans Dragons v St Helens	6 October 2023, 20:00	Sky Sports
Semi Final 2	Wigan Warriors v Hull KR	7 October 2023, 12:45	Sky Sports & Channel 4
Grand Final	Wigan Warriors v Catalans Dragons	14 October 2023, 18:00	Sky Sports
