= 2025 Challenge Cup final =

Rugby league match in the United Kingdom

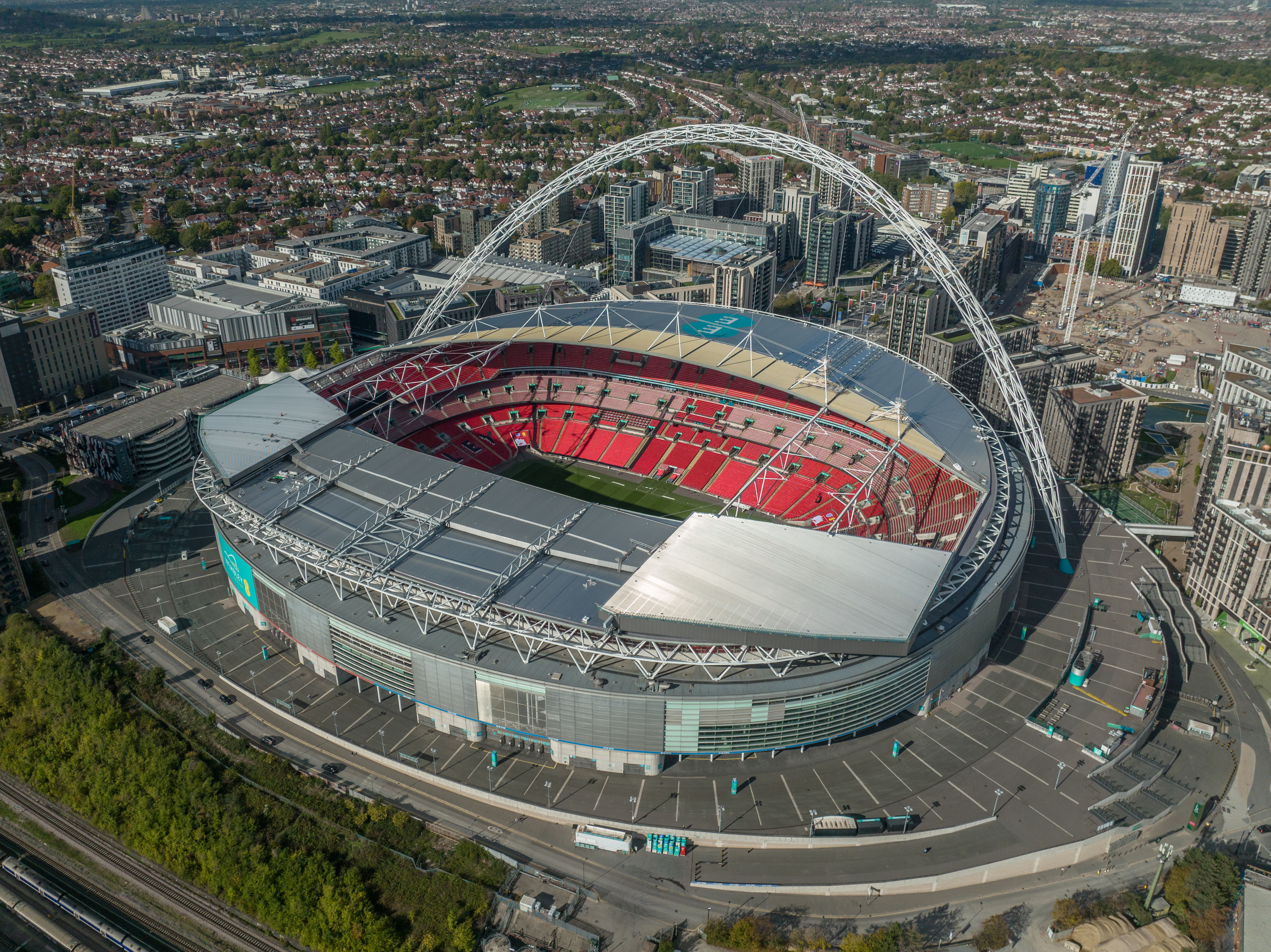
- The match took place at Wembley Stadium
Warrington Wolves	Hull KR
6	8
	1	2	Total
WAR	6	0	6
HKR	2	6	8
- Date: 7 June 2025, 15:00
- Stadium: Wembley Stadium
- Location: London, United Kingdom
- Lance Todd Trophy: Marc Sneyd
- God Save The King and Abide with Me: Lizzie Jones
- Referee: Liam Moore
- Attendance: 63,278

Broadcast partners
- Broadcasters: (United Kingdom) BBC One (Australia) Fox Sports (Canada) Rogers (United States) Fox Sports

The 2025 Challenge Cup final was the 124th final of the Rugby Football League's Challenge Cup knock-out competition. The final was contested by the Warrington Wolves and Hull Kingston Rovers.

== Background ==
The Warrington Wolves returned to the Challenge Cup Final following their defeat to the Wigan Warriors in the 2024 Challenge Cup final. Their most recent Challenge Cup victory was in 2019, when they defeated St Helens to win their ninth title. Warrington qualified for the cup final and placed seventh in the 2025 table.

By comparison, the 2025 Challenge Cup final was Hull Kingston Rovers' ninth final, having lost to the Leigh Leopards in a golden point finish at the 2023 Challenge Cup final. Their only win of their previous nine was a Hull Derby victory in 1979–80. Hull Kingston Rovers, who finished second in the 2024 Super League table and were also runners-up at the 2024 Super League Grand Final, qualified for the cup final and placed first in the 2025 table.

== Route to the final ==
=== Warrington Wolves ===
Round	Opposition	Venue	Score
Round 3	Whitehaven R.L.F.C.	Recreation Ground	44–4
Round 4	Widnes Vikings	Halton Stadium	26–16
Quarter-final	St Helens	Halliwell Jones Stadium	20–12
Semi-final	Leigh Leopards	Totally Wicked Stadium	21–14

=== Hull Kingston Rovers ===
Round	Opposition	Venue	Score
Round 3	York Knights	York Community Stadium	44–2
Round 4	Oldham R.L.F.C.	Craven Park	40–0
Quarter-final	Hull F.C.	MKM Stadium	32–16
Semi-final	Catalans Dragons	York Community Stadium	36–12

== Pre-match ==
Ten years from her first appearance singing the anthems at the 2015 Challenge Cup Final in tribute to her husband and Keighley Cougars player Danny Jones, Lizzie Jones sang Abide with Me and God Save the King ahead of the match. Pre-match entertainment was also provided by Capital XTRA DJ Kennedy Taylor.

Wembley hosted the 2025 RFL Champion Schools final, known as the Steven Mullaney Memorial Game, which saw St Helens' Rainford High School rugby league team beat Kingston upon Hull's Sirius Academy West team 40–0, marking a record scoreline for the 50th iteration of the final.

Wigan Warriors Women and St Helens Women, the latter winning the 2024 final, played in the preceding women's final. Wigan defeated St Helens 42–6 to claim their first Challenge Cup.

== Match details ==
Saturday, 7 June 2025
3:00 pm BST (UTC+01:00)

Warrington Wolves	6–8	Hull KR
Tries: 1 Thewlis 39'; Goals: 1 Sneyd 1/1 40'	report	Tries: 1 Davies 78'; Goals: 2 Lewis 2/2 pen 26', 79'

Wembley Stadium, London
Attendance: 63,278
Referees: Liam Moore, Jack Smith (video referee)
Touch judges: Marcus Griffiths and Richard Thompson

=== Teams ===
Team details
Warrington Wolves		Position	Hull KR
Name	Number	Position	Number	Name
Matt Dufty (substituted off) 75'	1	FB	18	Jack Broadbent
Josh Thewlis	2	WG	2	Tom Davies
Toby King	3	CE	3	Peta Hiku
Rodrick Tai	4	CE	12	James Batchelor
Arron Lindop	33	WG	5	Joe Burgess
George Williams	6	SO	6	Mikey Lewis
Marc Sneyd	35	SH	7	Tyrone May
Luke Yates (substituted off) 29', (substituted on) 59'	13	PR	8	Sauaso Sue (substituted off) 29', (substituted on) 52', (substituted off) 59'
Sam Powell (substituted off) 33', (substituted on) 48'	14	HK	14	Michael McIlorum (substituted off) 29'
Paul Vaughan (substituted off) 29', (substituted on) 54', (substituted off) 75'	10	PF	10	Jared Waerea-Hargreaves (substituted off) 22', (substituted on) 75'
Adam Holroyd	21	SR	11	Dean Hadley
Ben Currie	11	SR	16	Jai Whitbread (substituted off) 73'
Lachlan Fitzgibbon	12	LF	13	Elliot Minchella
James Harrison (substituted on) 29', (substituted off) 59', (substituted on) 75'	14	IN	9	Jez Litten (substituted on) 29'
Joe Philbin (substituted on) 29', (substituted off) 48'	15	IN	15	Sam Luckley (substituted on) 29', (substituted off) 52', (substituted on) 73'
Jordan Crowther (substituted on) 33', (substituted off) 54'	17	IN	20	Kelepi Tanginoa (substituted on) 22'
Stefan Ratchford (substituted on) 75'	19	IN	21	Jack Brown (substituted on) 59', (substituted off) 75'
Max Wood (not used)	24	CS	24	Eribe Doro (not used)
Sam Burgess		Coach		Willie Peters

== Post-match ==
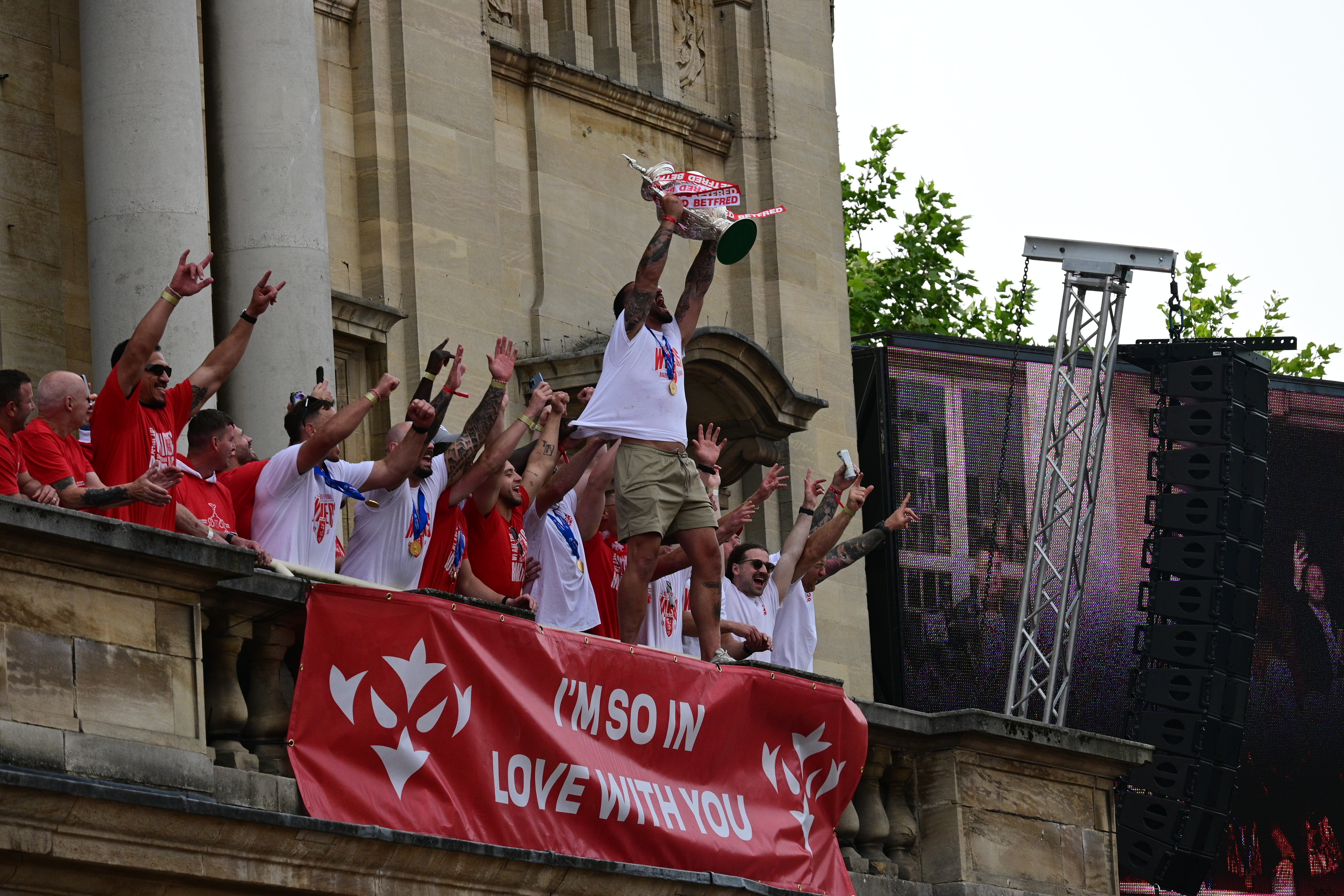
Elliot Minchella and the Hull Kingston Rovers squad celebrate lifting the Challenge Cup at Hull City Hall

The 2025 RFL 1895 Cup final between Featherstone Rovers and York Knights took place following the men's final, seeing York defeat Featherstone in golden point extra time 5–4. A victory parade was held on a boat travelling along York's River Ouse the following day.

Also a day after their final, Hull Kingston Rovers held a victory parade from their home stadium at Craven Park to Hull City Hall.

The final had a peak UK television viewership of 1.2 million.

== See also ==
- 2025 Women's Challenge Cup final
