= 2022 RFL Championship season results =

Rugby league competition results

The fixture list for the 2022 RFL Championship was issued on 13 November 2021. The regular season comprises 27 rounds to be followed by the play-offs.

All times are UK local time (UTC±00:00 until 27 March 2022, UTC+01:00 thereafter).

== Regular season ==
=== Round 1 ===
Betfred Championship: round one
Home	Score	Away	Match Information
Home	Score	Away	Date and Time	Venue	Referee	Attendance
Workington Town	6–20	Newcastle Thunder	30 January 2022, 14:00	Derwent Park	J. Vella	1,205
Barrow Raiders	22–10	Sheffield Eagles	30 January 2022, 15:00	Craven Park	T. Grant	1,927
Batley Bulldogs	30–18	Halifax Panthers	30 January 2022, 15:00	Fox's Biscuits Stadium	C. Kendall	1,796
Dewsbury Rams	16–46	Bradford Bulls	30 January 2022, 15:00	Tetley's Stadium	B. Thaler	2,241
Leigh Centurions	50–4	Whitehaven	30 January 2022, 15:00	Leigh Sports Village	J. Child	3,334
London Broncos	12–34	Widnes Vikings	30 January 2022, 15:00	Plough Lane	N. Bennett	2,182
York City Knights	12–30	Featherstone Rovers	31 January 2022, 19:45	York Community Stadium	J. Smith	3,602

=== Round 2 ===
Betfred Championship: round two
Home	Score	Away	Match Information
Home	Score	Away	Date and Time	Venue	Referee	Attendance
Bradford Bulls	14–28	Sheffield Eagles	6 February 2022, 15:00	Odsal Stadium	L. Moore	3,547
Halifax Panthers	28–0	London Broncos	6 February 2022, 15:00	The Shay	J. Child	1,433
Newcastle Thunder	14–32	Batley Bulldogs	6 February 2022, 15:00	Kingston Park	M. Griffiths	638
Whitehaven	4–18	Barrow Raiders	6 February 2022, 15:00	Recreation Ground	J. Smith	1,795
Widnes Vikings	70–18	Workington Town	6 February 2022, 15:00	Halton Stadium	A. Moore	3,623
York City Knights	30–2	Dewsbury Rams	6 February 2022, 15:00	York Community Stadium	T. Grant	1,562
Featherstone Rovers	28–6	Leigh Centurions	7 February 2022, 19:45	Post Office Road	R. Hicks	4,562

=== Round 3 ===
Betfred Championship: round three
Home	Score	Away	Match Information
Home	Score	Away	Date and Time	Venue	Referee	Attendance
Workington Town	10–26	Featherstone Rovers	13 February 2022, 14:00	Derwent Park	C. Worlsey	1,007
Barrow Raiders	14–6	Newcastle Thunder	13 February 2022, 15:00	Craven Park	N. Bennett	1,744
Batley Bulldogs	4–10	York City Knights	13 February 2022, 15:00	Fox's Biscuits Stadium	S. Mikalauskas	971
Dewsbury Rams	12–10	Sheffield Eagles	13 February 2022, 15:00	Tetley's Stadium	J. Vella	846
Halifax Panthers	8–9	Widnes Vikings	13 February 2022, 15:00	The Shay	J. Smith	2,046
London Broncos	0–8	Whitehaven	13 February 2022, 15:00	Plough Lane	M. Smaill	1,411
Leigh Centurions	38–4	Bradford Bulls	14 February 2022, 19:45	Leigh Sports Village	A. Moore	2,746

=== Round 4 ===
Betfred Championship: round four
Home	Score	Away	Match Information
Home	Score	Away	Date and Time	Venue	Referee	Attendance
Newcastle Thunder	40–24	Whitehaven	19 February 2022, 15:00	Kingston Park	C. Worsley	719
Featherstone Rovers	30–12	London Broncos	19 February 2022, 17:30	Post Office Road	J. Vella	2,796
Workington Town	6–42	Halifax Panthers	27 March 2022, 14:00 (Note: Match scheduled for 20 February postponed due to severe weather warning.)	Derwent Park	B. Thaler	819
Batley Bulldogs	32–22	Sheffield Eagles	3 August 2022, 19:30 (Note: Match scheduled for 20 February 2022 postponed – waterlogged pitch.)	Fox's Biscuits Stadium	C. Worsley	964
Bradford Bulls	22–23	Barrow Raiders	10 April 2022, 15:00	Odsal Stadium	B. Thaler	3,258
York City Knights	4–40	Leigh Centurions	20 February 2022, 15:00	York Community Stadium	J. Smith	2,069
Dewsbury Rams	10–36	Widnes Vikings	21 February 2022, 19:45	Tetley's Stadium	S. Mikalauskas	2,503

=== Round 5 ===
Betfred Championship: round five
Home	Score	Away	Match Information
Home	Score	Away	Date and Time	Venue	Referee	Attendance
Leigh Centurions	34–18	Newcastle Thunder	6 March 2022, 13:45	Leigh Sports Village	M. Griffiths	3,009
Workington Town	4–54	Sheffield Eagles	6 March 2022, 14:00	Derwent Park	J. Vella	779
Bradford Bulls	21–20	Batley Bulldogs	6 March 2022, 15:00	Odsal Stadium	B. Thaler	3,789
Featherstone Rovers	22–12	Halifax Panthers	6 March 2022, 15:00	Post Office Road	J. Smith	3,728
London Broncos	24–26	York City Knights	6 March 2022, 15:00	Plough Lane	M. Smaill	903
Whitehaven	40–12	Dewsbury Rams	6 March 2022, 15:00	Recreation Ground	S. Mikalauskas	764
Widnes Vikings	24–34	Barrow Raiders	7 March 2022, 19:45	Halton Stadium	C. Worsley	3,422

=== Round 6 ===
Betfred Championship: round six
Home	Score	Away	Match Information
Home	Score	Away	Date and Time	Venue	Referee	Attendance
Workington Town	12–26	Bradford Bulls	20 March 2022, 14:00	Derwent Park	A. Moore	1,031
Barrow Raiders	18–18	London Broncos	20 March 2022, 15:00	Craven Park	S. Mikalauskas	1,979
Batley Bulldogs	20–20	Featherstone Rovers	20 March 2022, 15:00	Fox's Biscuits Stadium	M. Griffiths	1,582
Dewsbury Rams	22–24	Newcastle Thunder	20 March 2022, 15:00	Tetley's Stadium	J. Vella	786
Whitehaven	6–44	Sheffield Eagles	20 March 2022, 15:00	Recreation Ground	M. Smaill	1,239
York City Knights	32–6	Widnes Vikings	20 March 2022, 15:00	York Community Stadium	B. Thaler	2,156
Halifax Panthers	16–26	Leigh Centurions	21 March 2022, 19:45	The Shay	N. Bennett	2,202

=== Round 7 ===
Betfred Championship: round seven
Home	Score	Away	Match Information
Home	Score	Away	Date and Time	Venue	Referee	Attendance
Leigh Centurions	44–0	Dewsbury Rams	1 April 2022, 20:00	Leigh Sports Village	M. Smaill	2,569
Workington Town	18–44	York City Knights	3 April 2022, 14:00	Derwent Park	J. Vella	733
Barrow Raiders	18–30	Batley Bulldogs	3 April 2022, 15:00	Craven Park	J. Smith	1,964
Featherstone Rovers	44–18	Sheffield Eagles	3 April 2022, 15:00	Post Office Road	B. Thaler	2,842
Halifax Panthers	46–24	Whitehaven	3 April 2022, 15:00	The Shay	N. Bennett	1,413
London Broncos	6–8	Bradford Bulls	3 April 2022, 15:00	Plough Lane	C. Worsley	1,153
Newcastle Thunder	12–6	Widnes Vikings	3 April 2022, 15:00	Kingston Park	A. Moore	1,835

=== Round 8 ===
Betfred Championship: round eight
Home	Score	Away	Match Information
Home	Score	Away	Date and Time	Venue	Referee	Attendance
Widnes Vikings	6–36	Leigh Centurions	15 April 2022, 15:00	Halton Stadium	S. Mikalauskas	3,854
Featherstone Rovers	58–6	Barrow Raiders	15 April 2022, 18:00	Post Office Road	A. Moore	3,284
Batley Bulldogs	36–20	Dewsbury Rams	15 April 2022, 18:30	Fox's Biscuits Stadium	C. Worsley	2,182
Bradford Bulls	17–20	Halifax Panthers	15 April 2022, 19:00	Odsal Stadium	N. Bennett	5,231
Sheffield Eagles	30–10	London Broncos	16 April 2022, 15:00	Eco-Power Stadium (Note: Match played at Doncaster due to ongoing works at Sheffield's home ground)	B. Thaler	943
York City Knights	38–6	Newcastle Thunder	16 April 2022, 18:00	York Community Stadium	J. Vella	1,445
Whitehaven	22–14	Workington Town	17 April 2022, 19:00	Recreation Ground	M. Smaill	1,975

=== Round 9 ===
Betfred Championship: round nine
Home	Score	Away	Match Information
Home	Score	Away	Date and Time	Venue	Referee	Attendance
Sheffield Eagles	34–20	Newcastle Thunder	22 April 2022, 19:45	Sheffield Olympic Legacy Stadium	M. Rossleigh	385
Dewsbury Rams	19–18	Workington Town	24 April 2022, 15:00	Tetley's Stadium	N. Bennett	711
Halifax Panthers	40–18	Barrow Raiders	24 April 2022, 15:00	The Shay	C. Kendall	1,627
Leigh Centurions	64–0	London Broncos	24 April 2022, 15:00	Leigh Sports Village	L. Moore	2,587
Widnes Vikings	10–38	Batley Bulldogs	24 April 2022, 15:00	Halton Stadium	B. Thaler	2,499
York City Knights	30–12	Whitehaven	24 April 2022, 15:00	York Community Stadium	S. Mikalauskas	1,449
Bradford Bulls	18–32	Featherstone Rovers	25 April 2022, 19:45	Odsal Stadium	J. Vella	3,029

=== Round 10 ===
Betfred Championship: round ten
Home	Score	Away	Match Information
Home	Score	Away	Date and Time	Venue	Referee	Attendance
Leigh Centurions	34–6	Sheffield Eagles	29 April 2022, 20:00	Leigh Sports Village	S. Mikalauskas	2,431
Newcastle Thunder	10–30	Halifax Panthers	30 April 2022, 15:00	Kingston Park	J. Vella	657
Workington Town	10–16	Batley Bulldogs	1 May 2022, 14:00	Derwent Park	N. Bennett	726
Featherstone Rovers	72–4	Widnes Vikings	1 May 2022, 15:00	Post Office Road	A. Moore	4,317
London Broncos	36–12	Dewsbury Rams	1 May 2022, 15:00	Plough Lane	J. Smith	732
Whitehaven	22–34	Bradford Bulls	1 May 2022, 15:00	Recreation Ground	B. Thaler	1,099
Barrow Raiders	18–30	York City Knights	2 May 2022, 19:45	Craven Park	M. Smaill	2,260

=== Round 11 ===
Betfred Championship: round eleven
Home	Score	Away	Match Information
Home	Score	Away	Date and Time	Venue	Referee	Attendance
London Broncos	22–52	Newcastle Thunder	13 May 2022, 19:45	Leigh Sports Village	M. Smaill	940
Barrow Raiders	26–12	Workington Town	15 May 2022, 15:00	Craven Park	N. Bennett	2,451
Bradford Bulls	6–20	York City Knights	15 May 2022, 15:00	Odsal Stadium	R. Hicks	3,081
Dewsbury Rams	26–46	Featherstone Rovers	15 May 2022, 15:00	Tetley's Stadium	S. Mikalauskas	1,855
Halifax Panthers	38–14	Sheffield Eagles	15 May 2022, 15:00	The Shay	A. Moore	1,476
Widnes Vikings	56–16	Whitehaven	15 May 2022, 15:00	Halton Stadium	J. Vella	2,520
Batley Bulldogs	0–52	Leigh Centurions	16 May 2022, 19:45	Fox's Biscuits Stadium	B. Thaler	1,794

=== Round 12 ===
Betfred Championship: round twelve
Home	Score	Away	Match Information
Home	Score	Away	Date and Time	Venue	Referee	Attendance
Featherstone Rovers	78–0	Whitehaven	21 May 2022, 17:30	Post Office Road	M. Smaill	2,572
Bradford Bulls	36–20	Newcastle Thunder	21 May 2022, 18:00	Odsal Stadium	A. Moore	3,159
Batley Bulldogs	28–12	London Broncos	22 May 2022, 15:00	Fox's Biscuits Stadium	L. Rush	797
Dewsbury Rams	18–20	Barrow Raiders	22 May 2022, 15:00	Tetley's Stadium	R. Hicks	691
Leigh Centurions	54–6	Workington Town	22 May 2022, 15:00	Leigh Sports Village	J. Vella	2,459
York City Knights	24–40	Halifax Panthers	22 May 2022, 15:00	York Community Stadium	B. Thaler	2,056
Sheffield Eagles	34–24	Widnes Vikings	23 May 2022, 19:45	Sheffield Olympic Legacy Stadium	M. Rossleigh	795

=== Round 13 ===
Betfred Championship: round thirteen
Home	Score	Away	Match Information
Home	Score	Away	Date and Time	Venue	Referee	Attendance
Halifax Panthers	66–0	Dewsbury Rams	31 May 2022, 19:30	The Shay	M. Smaill	1,554
Workington Town	32–18	London Broncos	2 June 2022, 12:30	Derwent Park	L. Rush	1,135
Barrow Raiders	28–30	Leigh Centurions	2 June 2022, 15:00	Craven Park	B. Thaler	2,422
Newcastle Thunder	10–46	Featherstone Rovers	2 June 2022, 15:00	Kingston Park	N. Bennett	1,188
Sheffield Eagles	14–34	York City Knights	2 June 2022, 15:00	Sheffield Olympic Legacy Stadium	S. Mikalauskas	786
Whitehaven	6–46	Batley Bulldogs	2 June 2022, 15:00	Recreation Ground	A. Moore	1,147
Widnes Vikings	6–31	Bradford Bulls	2 June 2022, 15:00	Halton Stadium	M. Rossleigh	3,258

=== Round 14 ===
Betfred Championship: round fourteen
Home	Score	Away	Match Information
Home	Score	Away	Date and Time	Venue	Referee	Attendance
Barrow Raiders	44–4	Widnes Vikings	5 June 2022, 15:00	Craven Park	A. Moore	2,451
Batley Bulldogs	46–0	Workington Town	5 June 2022, 15:00	Fox's Biscuits Stadium	N. Bennett	853
Dewsbury Rams	18–26	Whitehaven	5 June 2022, 15:00	Tetley's Stadium	B. Thaler	460
Leigh Centurions	36–0	Halifax Panthers	5 June 2022, 15:00	Leigh Sports Village	R. Hicks	3,132
Newcastle Thunder	18–32	Sheffield Eagles	5 June 2022, 15:00	Kingston Park	M. Rossleigh	628
York City Knights	36–34	London Broncos	5 June 2022, 15:00	York Community Stadium	J. Vella	1,572
Featherstone Rovers	58–12	Bradford Bulls	6 June 2022, 19:45	Post Office Road	M. Smaill	2,916

=== Round 15 ===
Betfred Championship: round fifteen
Home	Score	Away	Match Information
Home	Score	Away	Date and Time	Venue	Referee	Attendance
Workington Town	0–58	Barrow Raiders	12 June 2022, 14:00	Derwent Park	N. Bennett	1,207
Batley Bulldogs	58–18	Newcastle Thunder	12 June 2022, 15:00	Fox's Biscuits Stadium	L. Rush	869
Dewsbury Rams	18–26	London Broncos	12 June 2022, 15:00	Tetley's Stadium	M. Rossleigh	579
Sheffield Eagles	10–30	Bradford Bulls	12 June 2022, 15:00	Sheffield Olympic Legacy Stadium	A. Moore	799
Whitehaven	12–24	Halifax Panthers	12 June 2022, 15:00	Recreation Ground	M. Smaill	856
Widnes Vikings	14–16	York City Knights	12 June 2022, 15:00	Halton Stadium	B. Thaler	2,410
Leigh Centurions	32–12	Featherstone Rovers	13 June 2022, 19:45	Leigh Sports Village	R. Hicks	4,226

=== Round 16 ===
Betfred Championship: round sixteen
Home	Score	Away	Match Information
Home	Score	Away	Date and Time	Venue	Referee	Attendance
Sheffield Eagles	4–58	Leigh Centurions	24 June 2022, 19:45	Sheffield Olympic Legacy Stadium	B. Thaler	758
Bradford Bulls	48–6	Dewsbury Rams	26 June 2022, 15:00	Odsal Stadium	M. Rossleigh	3,423
Featherstone Rovers	20–28	Batley Bulldogs	26 June 2022, 15:00	Post Office Road	R. Hicks	3,263
Newcastle Thunder	66–22	Workington Town	26 June 2022, 15:00	Kingston Park	S. Mikalauskas	652
Whitehaven	16–40	York City Knights	26 June 2022, 15:00	Recreation Ground	J. Vella	856
Widnes Vikings	26–22	London Broncos	26 June 2022, 15:00	Halton Stadium	M. Smaill	2,926
Barrow Raiders	18–43	Halifax Panthers	27 June 2022, 19:45	Craven Park	A. Moore	2,205

=== Round 17 ===
Betfred Championship: round seventeen
Home	Score	Away	Match Information
Home	Score	Away	Date and Time	Venue	Referee	Attendance
Featherstone Rovers	56–22	Newcastle Thunder	2 July 2022, 18:00	Post Office Road	B. Thaler	2,427
Workington Town	0–38	Widnes Vikings	3 July 2022, 14:00	Derwent Park	L Rush	953
Batley Bulldogs	26–26	Whitehaven	3 July 2022, 15:00	Fox's Biscuits Stadium	M. Rossleigh	873
Bradford Bulls	6–56	Leigh Centurions	3 July 2022, 15:00	Odsal Stadium	A. Moore	4,654
Dewsbury Rams	12–38	Halifax Panthers	3 July 2022, 15:00	Tetley's Stadium	J. Vella	1,106
London Broncos	36–28	Sheffield Eagles	3 July 2022, 15:00	Stonebridge Road	N. Bennett	750
York City Knights	16–24	Barrow Raiders	3 July 2022, 15:00	York Community Stadium	M. Smaill	1,686

=== Round 18 ===
Betfred Championship: round eighteen
Home	Score	Away	Match Information
Home	Score	Away	Date and Time	Venue	Referee	Attendance
Newcastle Thunder	53–10	Bradford Bulls	8 July 2022, 19:45	Kingston Park	M. Smaill	3,034
Sheffield Eagles	18–20	Batley Bulldogs	8 July 2022, 19:45	Sheffield Olympic Legacy Stadium	S. Mikalauskas	678
Workington Town	0–66	Leigh Centurions	10 July 2022, 14:00	Derwent Park	M. Mannifield	759
Barrow Raiders	40–6	Whitehaven	10 July 2022, 15:00	Craven Park	B. Milligan	2,556
London Broncos	22–42	Featherstone Rovers	10 July 2022, 15:00	Plough Lane	M. Rossleigh	850
Widnes Vikings	20–16	Dewsbury Rams	10 July 2022, 15:00	Halton Stadium	N. Bennett	2,381
Halifax Panthers	36–10	York City Knights	11 July 2022, 19:45	The Shay	A. Moore	1,621

=== Round 19 ===
Betfred Championship: round nineteen
Home	Score	Away	Match Information
Home	Score	Away	Date and Time	Venue	Referee	Attendance
Bradford Bulls	12–30	London Broncos	16 July 2022, 18:00	Odsal Stadium	N. Bennett	2,762
Dewsbury Rams	6–60	Leigh Centurions	17 July 2022, 15:00	Tetley's Stadium	T. Grant	1,149
Halifax Panthers	58–10	Workington Town	17 July 2022, 15:00	The Shay	M. Smaill	1,469
Sheffield Eagles	32–36	Barrow Raiders	17 July 2022, 15:00	Sheffield Olympic Legacy Stadium	J. Vella	621
Whitehaven	24–46	Featherstone Rovers	17 July 2022, 15:00	Recreation Ground	L. Rush	657
Widnes Vikings	33–26	Newcastle Thunder	17 July 2022, 15:00	Halton Stadium	M. Rossleigh	2,382
York City Knights	16–32	Batley Bulldogs	18 July 2022, 19:45	York Community Stadium	J. Child	2,158

=== Round 20 ===
Betfred Championship: round twenty
Home	Score	Away	Match Information
Home	Score	Away	Date and Time	Venue	Referee	Attendance
Newcastle Thunder	24–24	Dewsbury Rams	23 July 2022, 15:00	Kingston Park	N. Bennett	593
Barrow Raiders	30–4	Bradford Bulls	24 July 2022, 15:00	Craven Park	C. Worsley	2,559
Batley Bulldogs	18–24	Widnes Vikings	24 July 2022, 15:00	Fox's Biscuits Stadium	T. Grant	1,490
Featherstone Rovers	30–22	York City Knights	24 July 2022, 15:00	Post Office Road	M. Griffiths	2,248
London Broncos	38–10	Halifax Panthers	24 July 2022, 15:00	Plough Lane	M. Rossleigh	950
Sheffield Eagles	64–6	Workington Town	24 July 2022, 15:00	Sheffield Olympic Legacy Stadium	L. Rush	644
Whitehaven	4–64	Leigh Centurions	25 July 2022, 19:45	Recreation Ground	M. Smaill	1,010

=== Round 21 ===
Round 21 is the Summer Bash where all seven fixtures are played at the same location. For 2022 the Bash moved from the previous venue of Bloomfield Road, Blackpool to Headingley Stadium, Leeds.

Betfred Championship: round twenty-one
Home	Score	Away	Match Information
Home	Score	Away	Date and Time	Venue	Referee	Attendance
London Broncos	12–38	Sheffield Eagles	30 July 2022, 12:45	Headingley Stadium	J. Vella	6,752
Batley Bulldogs	60–6	Dewsbury Rams	30 July 2022, 15:00	Headingley Stadium	N. Bennett	6,752
Bradford Bulls	6–22	Halifax Panthers	30 July 2022, 17:15	Headingley Stadium	M. Smaill	6,752
Featherstone Rovers	16–46	Leigh Centurions	30 July 2022, 19:30	Headingley Stadium	L. Moore	6,752
Barrow Raiders	36–24	Widnes Vikings	31 July 2022, 13:45	Headingley Stadium	C. Worsley	4,011
Whitehaven	28–10	Workington Town	31 July 2022, 16:00	Headingley Stadium	S. Mikalauskas	4,011
Newcastle Thunder	18–27	York City Knights	31 July 2022, 18:15	Headingley Stadium	L. Rush	4,011

=== Round 22 ===
Betfred Championship: round twenty-two
Home	Score	Away	Match Information
Home	Score	Away	Date and Time	Venue	Referee	Attendance
Bradford Bulls	48–18	Workington Town	7 August 2022, 15:00	Odsal Stadium	L. Rush	2,691
Dewsbury Rams	10–22	York City Knights	7 August 2022, 15:00	Tetley's Stadium	J. Vella	711
Leigh Centurions	52–20	Barrow Raiders	7 August 2022, 15:00	Leigh Sports Village	J. Child	3,170
Newcastle Thunder	0–44	London Broncos	7 August 2022, 15:00	Kingston Park	A. Moore	395
Sheffield Eagles	38–26	Whitehaven	7 August 2022, 15:00	Sheffield Olympic Legacy Stadium	M. Rossleigh	727
Widnes Vikings	16–20	Featherstone Rovers	7 August 2022, 15:00	Halton Stadium	M. Smaill	2,944
Halifax Panthers	34–18	Batley Bulldogs	7 August 2022, 18:30	The Shay	S. Mikalauskas	1,882

=== Round 23 ===
Betfred Championship: round twenty-three
Home	Score	Away	Match Information
Home	Score	Away	Date and Time	Venue	Referee	Attendance
Sheffield Eagles	26–32	Halifax Panthers	12 August 2022, 19:45	Sheffield Olympic Legacy Stadium	J. Child	569
Batley Bulldogs	12–30	Barrow Raiders	14 August 2022, 15:00	Fox's Biscuits Stadium	R. Hicks	1,194
Featherstone Rovers	72–6	Dewsbury Rams	14 August 2022, 15:00	Post Office Road	N. Bennett	3,017
London Broncos	38–12	Workington Town	14 August 2022, 15:00	Plough Lane	S. Mikalauskas	908
Newcastle Thunder	0–60	Leigh Centurions	14 August 2022, 15:00	Kingston Park	J. Vella	2,127
Whitehaven	12–26	Widnes Vikings	14 August 2022, 15:00	Recreation Ground	A. Moore	1,088
York City Knights	16–20	Bradford Bulls	15 August 2022, 19:45	York Community Stadium	L. Rush	1,958

=== Round 24 ===
Betfred Championship: round twenty-four
Home	Score	Away	Match Information
Home	Score	Away	Date and Time	Venue	Referee	Attendance
Workington Town	16–22	Dewsbury Rams	21 August 2022, 14:00	Derwent Park	M. Smaill	650
Barrow Raiders	24–34	Featherstone Rovers	21 August 2022, 15:00	Craven Park	J. Child	2,570
Bradford Bulls	4–12	Whitehaven	21 August 2022, 15:00	Odsal Stadium	J. Vella	2,670
Halifax Panthers	42–10	Newcastle Thunder	21 August 2022, 15:00	The Shay	M. Rossleigh	1,492
Leigh Centurions	100–4	York City Knights	21 August 2022, 15:00	Leigh Sports Village	R. Hicks	2,744
London Broncos	30–20	Batley Bulldogs	21 August 2022, 15:00	Plough Lane	A. Moore	750
Widnes Vikings	18–30	Sheffield Eagles	21 August 2022, 15:00	Halton Stadium	L. Rush	2,212

=== Round 25 ===
Betfred Championship: round twenty-five
Home	Score	Away	Match Information
Home	Score	Away	Date and Time	Venue	Referee	Attendance
York City Knights	20–12	Sheffield Eagles	26 August 2022, 19:30	York Community Stadium	N.Bennett	1,598
Newcastle Thunder	10–62	Barrow Raiders	27 August 2022, 15:00	Kingston Park	J. Vella	687
Featherstone Rovers	64–18	Workington Town	27 August 2022, 18:00	Post Office Road	L. Rush	2,142
Halifax Panthers	40–18	Bradford Bulls	28 August 2022, 15:00	The Shay	S. Mikalauskas	2,706
Leigh Centurions	42–4	Widnes Vikings	28 August 2022, 15:00	Leigh Sports Village	M. Smaill	3,340
Whitehaven	40–20	London Broncos	28 August 2022, 15:00	Recreation Ground	C. Worsley	791
Dewsbury Rams	20–22	Batley Bulldogs	29 August 2022, 19:45	Tetley's Stadium	M. Rossleigh	1,307

=== Round 26 ===
Betfred Championship: round twenty-six
Home	Score	Away	Match Information
Home	Score	Away	Date and Time	Venue	Referee	Attendance
Sheffield Eagles	18–30	Featherstone Rovers	2 September 2022, 19:45	Sheffield Olympic Legacy Stadium	A. Moore	912
Newcastle Thunder	18–24	York City Knights	3 September 2022, 15:00	Kingston Park	J. Vella	689
Workington Town	6–28	Whitehaven	4 September 2022, 14:00	Derwent Park	N. Bennett	1,427
Barrow Raiders	44–28	Dewsbury Rams	4 September 2022, 15:00	Craven Park	L. Rush	2,370
Batley Bulldogs	40–12	Bradford Bulls	4 September 2022, 15:00	Fox's Biscuits Stadium	T. Grant	1,920
London Broncos	6–58	Leigh Centurions	4 September 2022, 15:00	Plough Lane	M. Griffiths	900
Widnes Vikings	4–32	Halifax Panthers	5 September 2022, 19:45	Halton Stadium	J. Smith	2,744

=== Round 27 ===
Betfred Championship: round twenty-seven
Home	Score	Away	Match Information
Home	Score	Away	Date and Time	Venue	Referee	Attendance
Sheffield Eagles	34–24	Dewsbury Rams	14 September 2022, 19:30 (Note: Originally scheduled for 9 September but postponed following the death of Queen Elizabeth II on 8 September.)	Sheffield Olympic Legacy Stadium	M. Rossleigh	604
Whitehaven	40–24	Newcastle Thunder	10 September 2022, 15:00	Recreation Ground	L. Rush	1,193
Bradford Bulls	10–23	Widnes Vikings	11 September 2022, 15:00	Odsal Stadium	M. Griffiths	3,504
Halifax Panthers	22–24	Featherstone Rovers	11 September 2022, 15:00	The Shay	C. Kendall	2,440
Leigh Centurions	64–6	Batley Bulldogs	11 September 2022, 15:00	Leigh Sports Village	L. Moore	3,481
London Broncos	20–30	Barrow Raiders	11 September 2022, 15:00	Plough Lane	J. Vella	900
York City Knights	74–12	Workington Town	11 September 2022, 15:00	York Community Stadium	M. Smaill	2,484

== Play-offs ==
The play-off structure is the same as used in 2021. The top two teams after the regular season, Leigh Centurions and Featherstone Rovers have byes to the semi-finals and home advantage in their semi-final fixtures. The teams finishing third to sixth meet in two eliminator games; 3rd v 6th and 4th v 5th. As the league leaders, Leigh, will play the lowest ranked team from the eliminators in the semi-finals with Featherstone meeting the other winner of the eliminators. The winners of the semi-finals will meet in the Million Pound Game with the winners being promoted to Super League for 2023.

=== Team bracket ===
Eliminators
3	Halifax Panthers	24
6	York City Knights	26
4	Barrow Raiders	8
5	Batley Bulldogs	18

Semi-finals
1	Leigh Centurions	70
6	York City Knights	10
2	Featherstone Rovers	28
5	Batley Bulldogs	32

Grand Final
1	Leigh Centurions	44
5	Batley Bulldogs	12

=== Eliminators ===
18 September 2022
15:00

Barrow Raiders	8–18	Batley Bulldogs
Tries: Gillam; Goals: Shaw (2)	report	Tries: Campbell, Leak (2); Goals: Gilmore (3)

Craven Park
Attendance: 3,595
Referee: M. Griffiths

18 September 2022
17:30

Halifax Panthers	24–26	York City Knights
Tries: Kavanagh, Walmsley (3); Goals: Keyes (4)	report	Tries: Brown, Jubb, Harris, Edwards; Goals: Glover (5)

The Shay
Attendance: 1,850
Referee: J. Smith

=== Semi-finals ===
25 September 2022
14:00

Leigh Centurions	70–10	York City Knights
Tries: Fergusson (3), Stone, MacDonald (2), Aekins (2), Chamberlain, Ipape (2), O'Donnell; Goals: Inu (11)		Tries: Marsh, Stock; Goals: Harris

Leigh Sports Village
Attendance: 3,329
Referee: M. Griffiths

25 September 2022
16:00

Featherstone Rovers	28–32	Batley Bulldogs
Tries: Hall, Hardcastle (2), Jones, Briscoe; Goals: Hall (4)		Tries: Campbell, Hooley, Meadows, Walshaw, Ganning; Goals: Ganning (6)

Post Office Road
Attendance: 2,600
Referee: R. Hicks

=== Championship Grand Final ===
2 October 2022
18:30

Leigh Centurions	44–12	Batley Bulldogs
Tries: Lam, Inu (2), Wardle, Aekins, Mellor, MacDonald, O'Donnell; Goals: Inu (5/6)		Tries: Morton, Gledhill; Goals: Gilmore (2/2)

Leigh Sports Village
Attendance: 7,233
Referee: Chris Kendall
