= Jake Thewlis =

Professional rugby league footballer

Personal information
- Full name: Jake Thewlis
- Born: 24 May 2005 (age 21) Oldham, Greater Manchester, England
- Height: 6 ft 0 in (1.83 m)
- Weight: 13 st 12 lb (88 kg)

Playing information
- Position: Wing
Club
Years	Team	Pld	T	G	FG	P
2023–	Warrington Wolves	21	17	0	0	68
2023(loan)	→ North Wales Crusaders	1	1	0	0	4
2024(loan)	→ North Wales Crusaders	7	0	0	0	0
2025(loan)	→ London Broncos	4	0	0	0	0
2025(loan)	→ Salford Red Devils	2	0	0	0	0
2026(loan)	→ Castleford Tigers	1	0	0	0	0
	Total	36	18	0	0	72
- Source: As of 18 April 2026
- Relatives: Josh Thewlis (brother)

Jake Thewlis (born 24 May 2005) is a professional rugby league footballer who plays as a winger for Warrington Wolves in the Super League.

He has spent time on loan from Warrington at North Wales Crusaders in RFL League One, at London Broncos in the RFL Championship, and at Salford Red Devils and Castleford Tigers in the Super League.

== Background ==
Thewlis was born in Grasscroft, Oldham, Greater Manchester, England. He was educated at St Edwards' Primary, Lees, and St Damian's RC Science College.

Thewlis played for the Waterhead Warriors and the Saddleworth Rangers as a junior. He played for Lancashire in the Academy Origin series.

He is of Irish heritage.

His brother Josh Thewlis is a fellow Warrington Wolves player.

== Career ==
=== Warrington Wolves ===
Thewlis was Warrington's reserves player of the year in 2023, as well as playing in that year's academy Grand Final against St Helens.

In 2024, Thewlis made his debut for the Wire in the Super League against the Wigan Warriors.

==== Castleford Tigers (loan) ====
On 30 March 2026, Castleford Tigers announced the arrival of Thewlis on a one-month loan deal, with Warrington holding a recall option. He made just one appearance for Castleford before returning to his parent club.
