= Alfie Johnson =

English rugby league & union footballer

- Born: 17 June 2001 (age 25) Guildford, Surrey, England
- Height: 6 ft 2 in (1.87 m)
- Weight: 13 st 10 lb (87 kg)
- School: Royal Grammar School, Guildford
- University: Newcastle University

Rugby union career
National sevens team
Years	Team	Comps
2019	England 7s	
- Rugby league career

Playing information
Club
Years	Team	Pld	T	G	FG	P
2025	Warrington Wolves	2	1	0	0	4
2025(DR)	→ Widnes Vikings	1	0	0	0	0
2025 (DR)	→ London Broncos	1	0	0	0	0
2025(loan)	→ Halifax Panthers	8	4	0	0	16
2026	Halifax Panthers	15	13	1	0	54
2027–	Castleford Tigers	0	0	0	0	0
	Total	27	18	1	0	74
- As of 13 November 2026

Alfie Johnson (born 17 June 2001) is an English rugby league footballer who plays for Castleford Tigers in the Super League. He has previously played rugby union for England at Rugby Sevens.

== Early life ==
He is from Guildford in Surrey. He attended Royal Grammar School, Guildford, and studied economics at Newcastle University where he played wing and full-back in their rugby union programme.

== Club career ==
He played for Leeds Rhinos reserve side in 2024, where his performances included scoring four tries in a match against Castleford Tigers.

=== Warrington Wolves ===
He signed a two-year contract with Super League side Warrington Wolves in October 2024.

=== Widnes Vikings (DR) ===
On 12 February 2025 it was reported he would join Widnes Vikings on DR loan.

=== London Broncos (DR) ===
On 28 March 2025 it was reported that he had signed for London Broncos in the RFL Championship on DR loan

=== Halifax Panthers (loan) ===
On 8 May 2025 it was reported that he had signed for Halifax Panthers in the RFL Championship on loan until the end of the 2025 season.

=== Halifax Panthers ===
On 27 October 2025 it was reported that he had signed for Halifax Panthers in the RFL Championship on a 1-year deal

=== Castleford Tigers ===
On 17 July 2026 it was reported that he had signed for Castleford Tigers for 2027 in the Super League on a 2-year deal.

== International career ==
Johnson has represented England and Great Britain at international Rugby Sevens, making his debut for England in 2019 and scoring a try in the bronze medal match in the Canada leg of the Sevens World Series in Hamilton.
