= Matthew Dufty =

Australian rugby league footballer (born 1996)

Matt Dufty
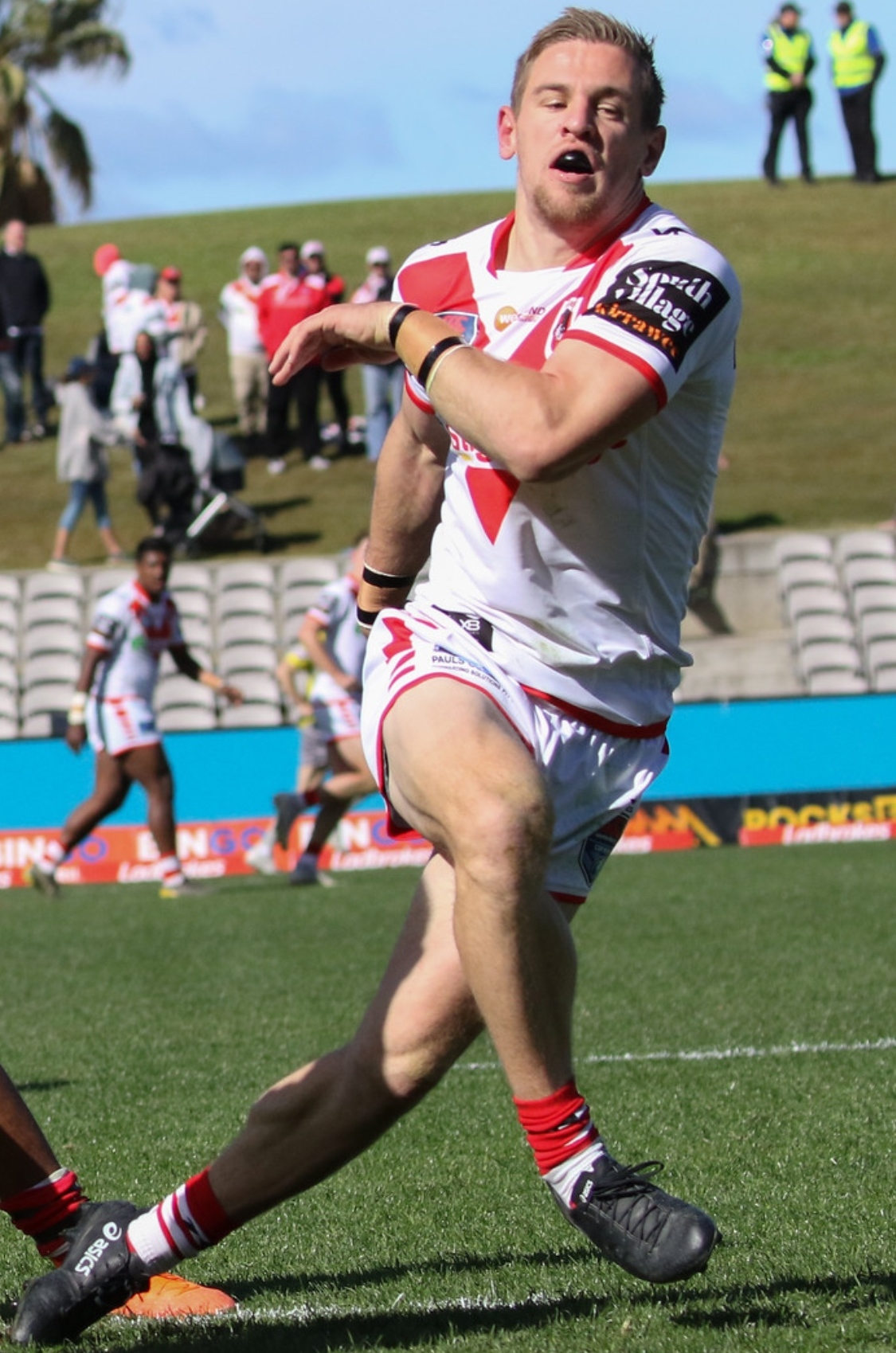

Personal information
- Full name: Matthew Lawrence Dufty
- Born: 10 January 1996 (age 30) Hurstville, New South Wales, Australia
- Height: 179 cm (5 ft 10 in)
- Weight: 83 kg (13 st 1 lb)

Playing information
- Position: Fullback
Club
Years	Team	Pld	T	G	FG	P
2017–21	St. George Illawarra	82	44	0	0	176
2022	Canterbury Bulldogs	12	1	0	0	4
2022–25	Warrington Wolves	88	47	0	0	188
2026–	South Sydney	15	3	0	0	12
	Total	197	95	0	0	380
- Source: As of 6 November 2026

Matthew Lawrence Dufty (born 10 January 1996) is an Australian professional rugby league footballer who plays as a fullback for the South Sydney Rabbitohs in the NSW Cup.

He previously played for the St. George Illawarra Dragons and the Canterbury Bulldogs in the NRL and Warrington Wolves in the Betfred Super League.

== Background ==
Dufty was born on 10 January 1996 in Hurstville, New South Wales, Australia. He attended Marist Catholic College Penshurst from Year 7 to Year 10.

He played his junior rugby league for the Penshurst RSL RLFC, before being signed by the St. George Illawarra Dragons.

== Playing career ==
=== Early career ===
From 2014 to 2016, Dufty played for the St. George Illawarra Dragons' NYC team.

In July 2016, he played for the New South Wales under-20s team against the Queensland under-20s team,

In 2016 he re-signed with the St. George club on a two-year contract until the end of 2018. In September 2016, he was named on the interchange bench in the 2016 NYC Team of the Year. Dufty played 65 games and scored 55 tries for 220 points in his U20s career from 2014 to 2016.

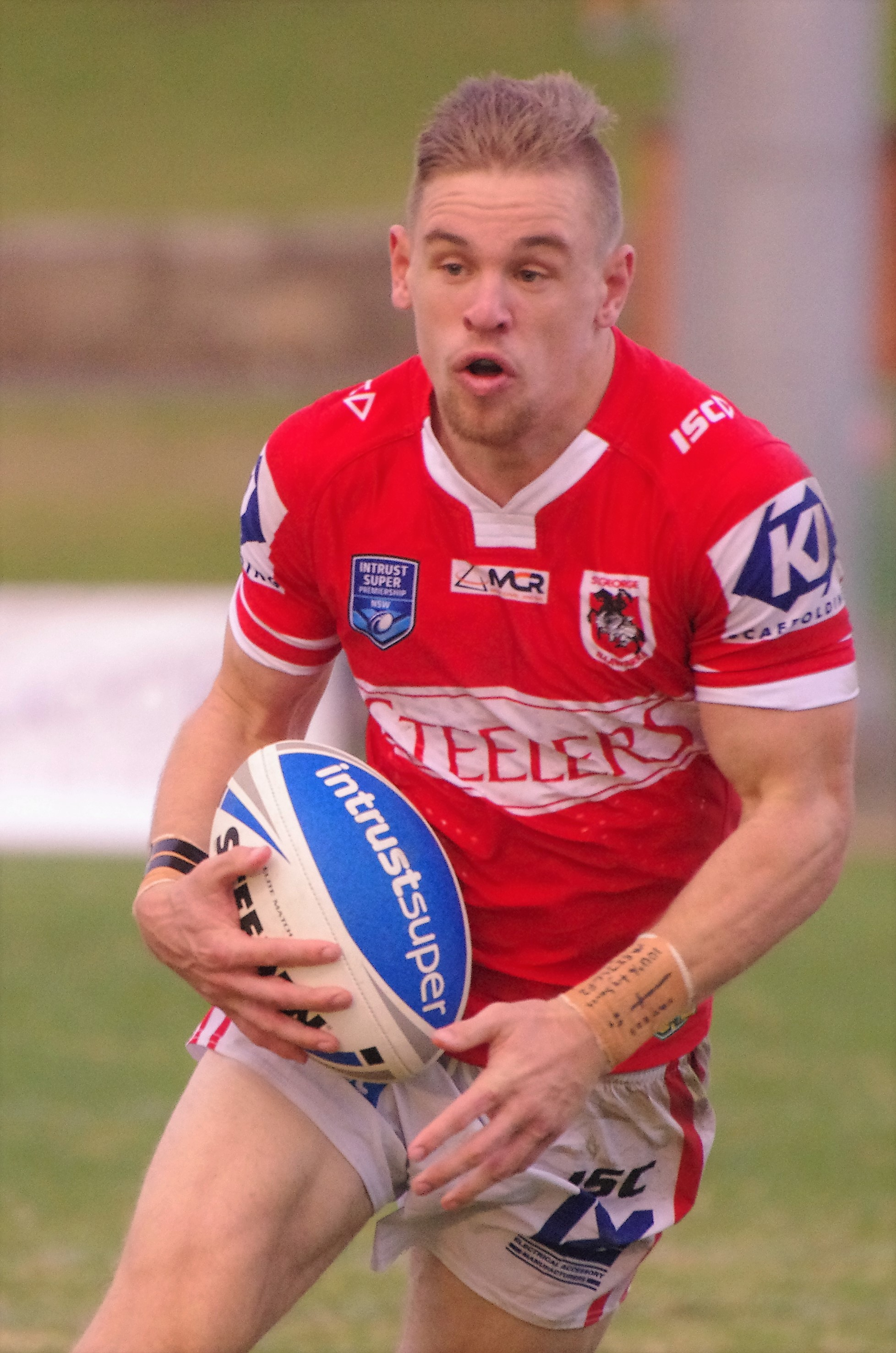
Dufty playing for the Illawarra Cutters in 2017

=== 2017 ===
In 2017, Dufty graduated to St. George Illawarra's Intrust Super Premiership NSW team, the Illawarra Cutters. In round 20 of the 2017 NRL season, he made his NRL debut for the St. George club against the Manly Warringah Sea Eagles, scoring a try and providing two try assists.

=== 2018 ===
In the 2018 NRL season, Dufty made 26 appearances for St. George and scored 13 tries as the club finished 7th on the table and qualified for the finals. Dufty played in both finals games, the 48–18 upset victory against Brisbane at Suncorp Stadium and the 13–12 elimination final defeat against South Sydney.

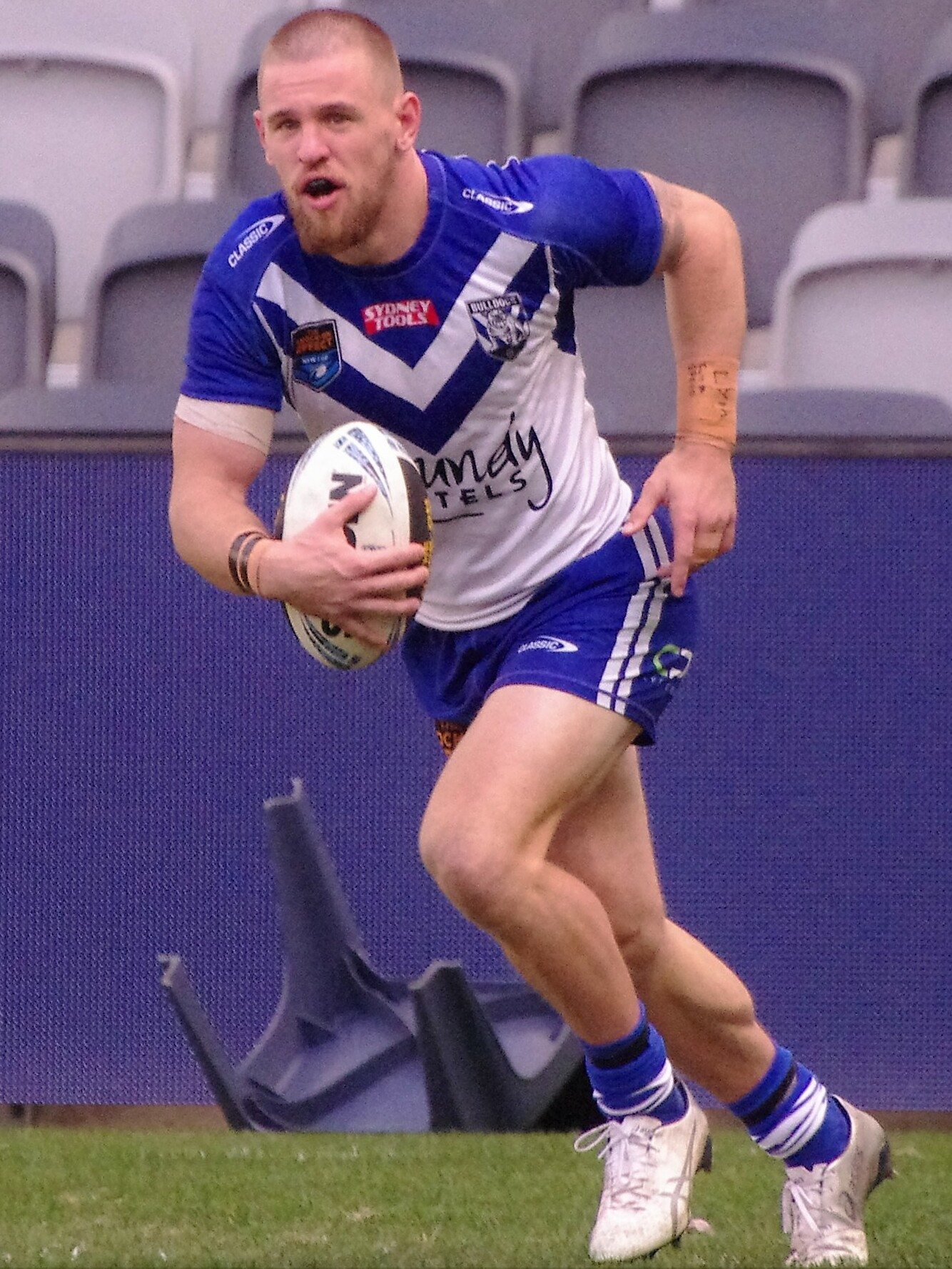
Dufty playing for the Canterbury Bulldogs in 2022

=== 2019 ===
On 18 February Dufty signed a two-year contract extension to remain at St. George Illawarra until the end of the 2021 season. On 25 April Dufty scored an individual 65 metre try for St. George Illawarra during their match against the Sydney Roosters in the traditional ANZAC Day game. Fox Sports Commentator Andrew Voss said of the try "What a try here at the SCG!, So many great tries over many, many years, and the name Matt Dufty belongs to one as of today. That is super. Tedesco is looking up saying, 'Which way did he go? ... How many steps Dufty? More than the Opera House!".

Dufty made a total of 16 appearances and scored five tries for St. George Illawarra in the 2019 NRL season as the club endured one of the worst ever seasons finishing 15th on the table just above the last placed Gold Coast.

=== 2020 ===
On 15 February, Dufty suffered a fractured cheekbone whilst playing for St. George Illawarra in the pre-season NRL Nines competition against Parramatta and was ruled out for six to eight weeks.

Dufty returned to the St. George Illawarra side for their round 2 match against Penrith at Kogarah Oval. Dufty scored two tries in a 28–32 loss.

In round 10 against Canterbury, Dufty scored two tries as St. George Illawarra won the match 28–22 at WIN Stadium. This was Dufty's fifth try in three matches.

In round 20, Dufty scored two tries in a 30–22 victory over Melbourne at Kogarah Oval. Dufty finished the season with 13 tries for the club.

=== 2021 ===
In round 3 of the 2021 NRL season, Dufty scored two tries in a 38–12 victory over Manly at WIN Stadium.

In round 5 of the 2021 NRL season, Dufty scored two tries and created two try assists to defeat Parramatta.

In round 9 of the 2021 NRL season, he scored two tries in a 32–12 victory over Canterbury.

In round 13, Dufty scored two tries and had five try assists in a man of the match performance as St. George Illawarra defeated Brisbane 52–24.

In June, Dufty was informed by the club that his services would not be required for next season as he was not part of their plans going into the future. It was then reported that several northern hemisphere clubs, including St Helens, had expressed an interest in signing Dufty. It was revealed in July that Dufty had signed with the Canterbury-Bankstown Bulldogs on a one-year deal for the 2022 season.

=== 2022 ===
In round 1 of the 2022 NRL season, Dufty made his club debut for Canterbury in their 6–4 victory against North Queensland at the Queensland Country Bank Stadium.

On 21 July 2022, the Canterbury-Bankstown Bulldogs officially announced an early release grant for Dufty to take up an opportunity in the Super League. On the same day, Dufty signed a two-and-a-half-year deal to join English side Warrington. In round 21 of the 2022 Super League season, Dufty made his Warrington debut against Huddersfield which ended in defeat. Dufty injured his foot during the match and was taken from the field in the second half. In round 26 of the 2022 Super League season, Dufty scored four tries for Warrington in a 38–36 loss against Huddersfield.

=== 2023 ===
In round 24 of the 2023 Super League season, Dufty scored two tries for Warrington in their 66–12 victory over Castleford. Dufty played 28 games for Warrington in the 2023 Super League season and scored 13 tries as Warrington finished sixth on the table and qualified for the playoffs. Dufty played in the clubs elimination playoff loss against St Helens.

=== 2024 ===
In round 5 of the 2024 Super League season, Dufty scored a hat-trick in Warrington's 58–4 victory over the hapless London side. On 21 March, Dufty signed a contract extension with Warrington to remain at the club until the end of 2026. On 8 June, Dufty played in Warrington's 2024 Challenge Cup final defeat against Wigan. On 17 August, Dufty scored a hat-trick in Warrington's 24–6 Magic WKND win over the Leeds Rhinos at Elland Road and was awarded the Betfred Man of the Match award. Dufty played a total of 24 games for Warrington in the 2024 Super League season as the club reached the semi-final before losing to Hull Kingston Rovers.

=== 2025 ===
On 7 June, Dufty played in Warrington's 8-6 Challenge Cup final loss against Hull Kingston Rovers. Dufty played 21 games for Warrington in the 2025 Super League season as Warrington missed the playoffs finishing 8th on the table.

=== 2026 ===
On 7 January 2026 it was reported that he had left Warrington, by mutual consent, to return to Australia. On 19 January, it was reported that Dufty had signed a NSW Cup contract with South Sydney. Dufty made his club debut for South Sydney in the annual Charity Shield match against his former team St. George Illawarra. In round 7 of the 2026 NRL season, Dufty made his first start of the season for Souths against St. George Illawarra scoring a try in a 30-12 victory. Dufty played 15 games for South Sydney in the 2026 NRL season as the club finished 6th on the table and qualified for the finals. Dufty played in South Sydney's upset elimination final loss to Newcastle.

== Statistics ==
Year	Team	Games	Tries	Pts
2017	St. George Illawarra Dragons	7	3	12
2018	St. George Illawarra Dragons	26	13	52
2019	St. George Illawarra Dragons	16	5	20
2020	St. George Illawarra Dragons	18	13	52
2021	St. George Illawarra Dragons	15	10	40
2022	Canterbury-Bankstown Bulldogs	12	1	4
2022	Warrington	6	5	20
2023	Warrington	30	14	56
2024	Warrington	28	20	80
2025	Warrington	21	8	32
2026	South Sydney Rabbitohs	13	3	12
	Totals	195	95	380

== Controversy ==
On 5 July 2021, Dufty was fined $23,000 by the NRL and suspended for one game after breaching the game's COVID-19 bio-security protocols when he attended a party along with 12 other St. George Illawarra players at Paul Vaughan's property.
