= Marc Sneyd =

England international rugby league footballer

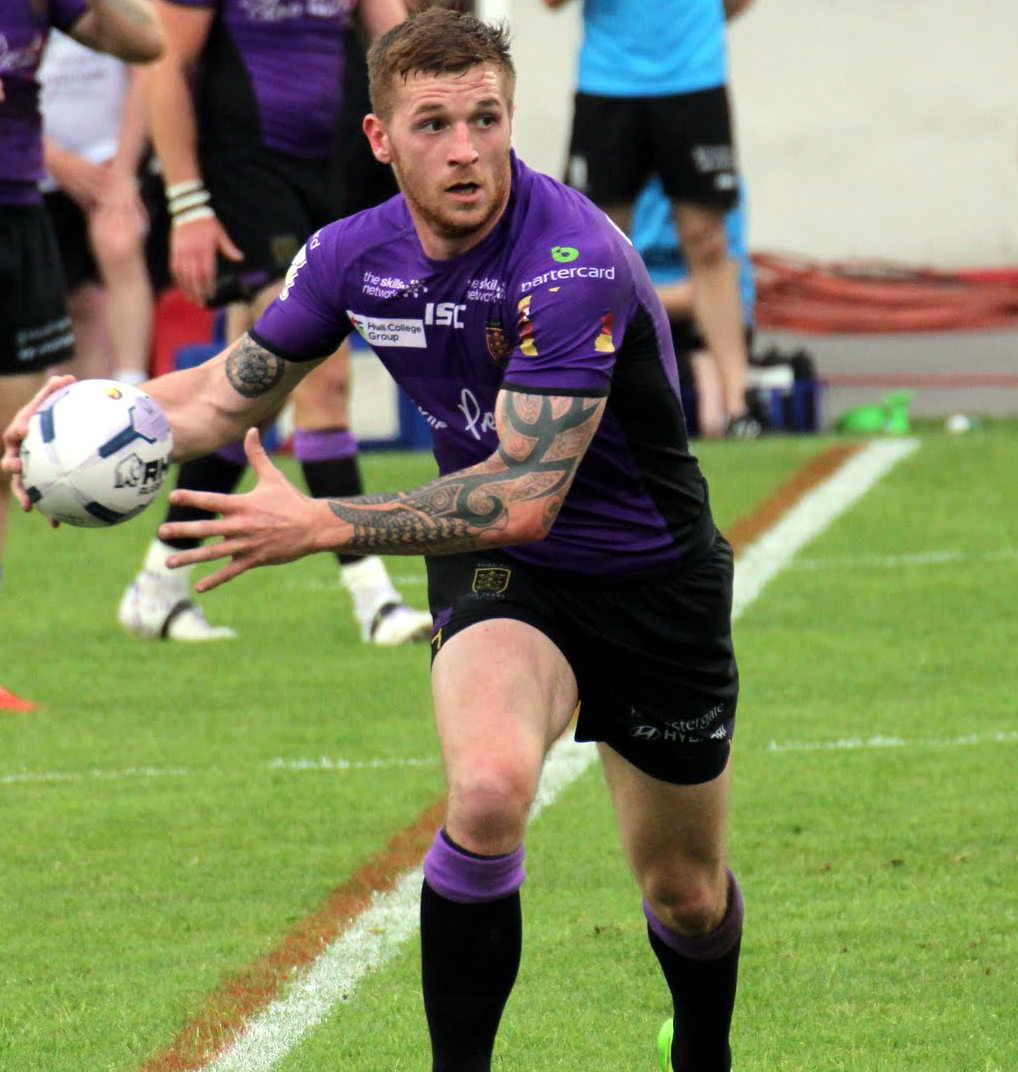

Personal information
- Born: 9 February 1991 (age 35) Oldham, Greater Manchester, England
- Height: 6 ft 0 in (1.84 m)
- Weight: 14 st 0 lb (89 kg)

Playing information
- Position: Scrum-half, Stand-off
Club
Years	Team	Pld	T	G	FG	P
2010–14	Salford Red Devils	50	7	81	3	193
2014(loan)	→ Castleford Tigers	31	7	116	2	262
2015–21	Hull F.C.	175	19	619	36	1350
2022–25	Salford Red Devils	86	10	299	10	648
2025–26	Warrington Wolves	36	2	103	3	217
2027–	Salford	0	0	0	0	0
	Total	378	45	1218	54	2670
Representative
Years	Team	Pld	T	G	FG	P
2022	England	2	1	20	0	44
- Source: As of 24 October 2026

Marc Sneyd (born 9 February 1991) is an English professional rugby league footballer who plays as a scrum-half for Salford in the Championship.

He made over 160 Super League appearances for Hull F.C., where he won two Challenge Cup finals, and also previously played for Salford and the Warrington Wolves, as well as a loan spell at the Castleford Tigers in the Super League. He also appeared for the England at international level. He played as a stand-off and fullback earlier in his career.

== Background ==
Sneyd was born in Oldham, Greater Manchester, England, and grew up in Shaw. He played junior rugby league for Waterhead Warriors.

== Club career ==
=== Salford ===
He came through the junior ranks at Salford. He made his début for Salford in 2010 but his game time was limited. In May 2013, he signed a new two-year contract with Salford.

=== Castleford ===
Sneyd joined Castleford Tigers on loan for the 2014 season. Castleford coach Daryl Powell described him as "...a quality player with the added benefit of an outstanding left-foot kicking game.” This was Sneyd's breakthrough season in which he scored 7 tries and kicked 117 goals in just 31 appearances, and appeared in the 2014 Challenge Cup Final defeat by the Leeds Rhinos at Wembley Stadium.

=== Hull F.C. ===
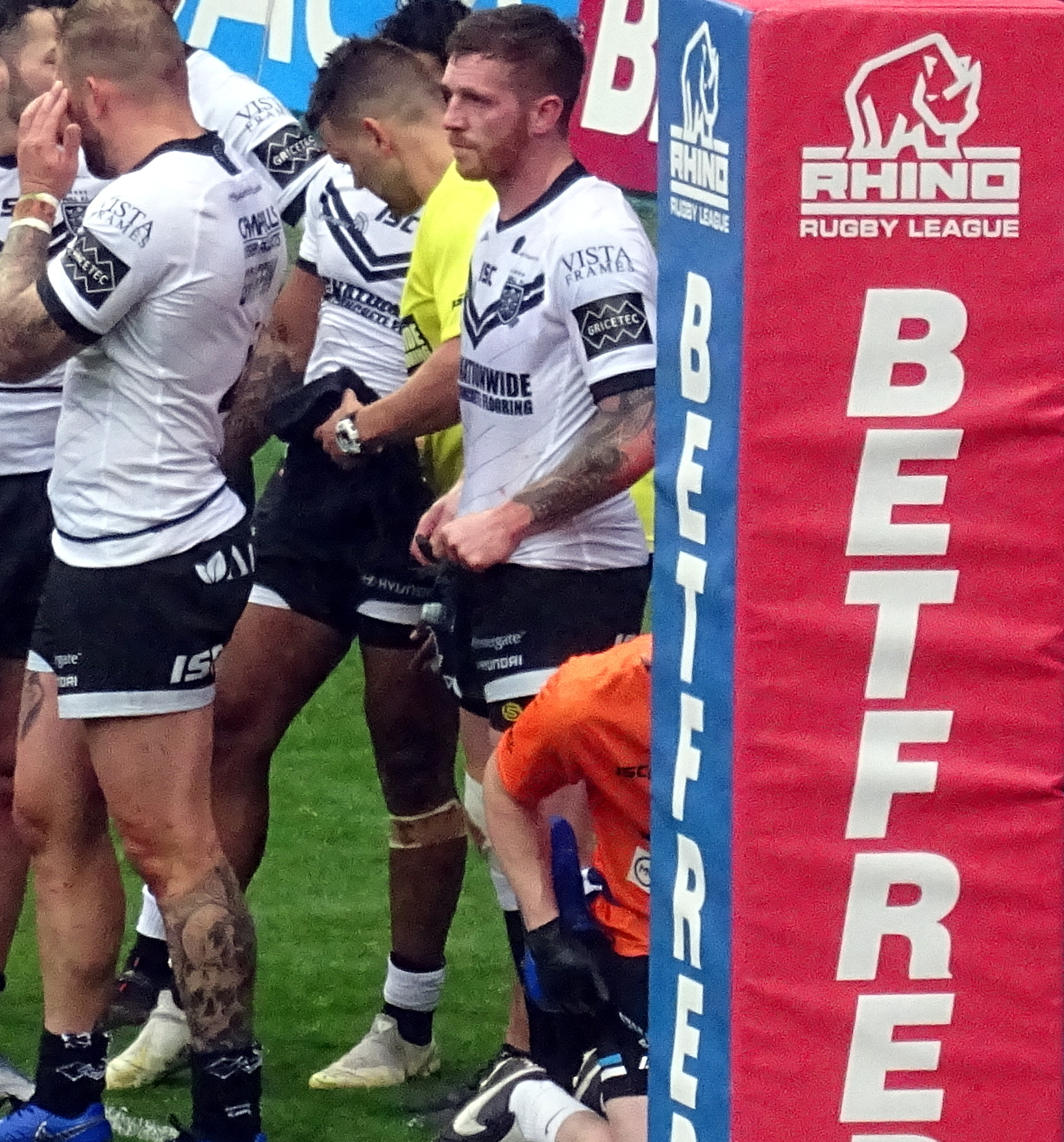
Sneyd in action for Hull at Anfield in 2019

A transfer request in June 2014 was turned down by Salford, but soon after, Sneyd signed a three-year contract with Hull F.C. Hull coach Lee Radford said he "...has a superb left-foot kicking game and a fantastic touch on the ball, which we think will give him the opportunity to blossom into a really good young British half-back."

In 2016, Sneyd kicked 130 goals and became the league's top goal-kicker. He won the 2016 Challenge Cup with Hull against the Warrington Wolves, kicking two goals in the narrow 12-10 win at Wembley Stadium; Sneyd was made man-of-the-match and won the prestigious Lance Todd Trophy.

In February 2017, he extended his contract with Hull until 2019. He won the 2017 Challenge Cup with Hull in an 18-14 victory over the record holders Wigan Warriors, and once again he was named the Lance Todd Trophy winner becoming only the second player to win the award two years in a row.

In February 2019, Sneyd scored the first ever golden point in Super League with a drop goal in a 23–22 win against Wigan Warriors. In April 2019, he signed a new three-year contract until the end of the 2022 season.

In April 2021, Sneyd overtook Michael Dobson in 9th position for the most conversions and penalty goals in Super League history.

=== Return to Salford ===
On 5 November 2021, Sneyd signed a three-year deal to join Salford beginning in the 2022 season. In round 3 of the 2022 Super League season, Sneyd was sent to the sin bin in his return game against Hull F.C. which ended in a 48-16 loss at the MKM Stadium. In round 26 of the 2022 Super League season, Sneyd scored two tries and kicked nine goals in Salford's 50-10 victory over Castleford. In round 5 of the 2023 Super League season, Sneyd kicked the winning drop goal in Salford's golden point extra-time victory over Wakefield Trinity. In the 2023 Super League season, Sneyd played 19 games for Salford as the club finished 7th on the table and missed the playoffs.

=== Warrington ===
On 13 March 2025, Sneyd joined Warrington on an immediate eighteen-month deal. He played in the 2025 Challenge Cup final against Hull Kingston Rovers, and was awarded the Lance Todd Trophy despite being on the losing side.

On 14 August 2026 it was reported that he had been released by Warrington Wolves with immediate effect - freeing him up to make a move elsewhere before this month’s transfer deadline

== International career ==
In October 2013, he was named in the Ireland squad for the 2013 Rugby League World Cup. However, despite being eligible through lineage, he was ruled ineligible after failing to complete the paperwork in time to register for the tournament.

Sneyd made his England debut in the 2021 Rugby League World Cup match against France in Bolton on 22 October 2022, kicking seven goals in England's 42-18 victory.

In the third group stage match, Sneyd scored a try and kicked 13 goals in England's 94-4 victory over Greece in Sheffield.

== Honours ==
=== Club ===
- Challenge Cup: (2) 2016, 2017
  - Runner-up: (2) 2014, 2025

=== Individual ===
- Lance Todd Trophy: (3) 2016, 2017, 2025
