= Connor Wrench =

English rugby league footballer

Personal information
- Full name: Connor Wrench
- Born: 4 October 2001 (age 24) Warrington, England
- Height: 6 ft 1 in (1.85 m)
- Weight: 14 st 5 lb (91 kg)

Playing information
- Position: Centre, Wing
Club
Years	Team	Pld	T	G	FG	P
2020–25	Warrington Wolves	37	16	0	0	64
2021(loan)	→ Newcastle Thunder	2	1	0	0	4
2023(DR)	→ North Wales Crusaders	1	2	0	0	8
2026–	Huddersfield Giants	1	1	0	0	4
	Total	41	20	0	0	80
Representative
Years	Team	Pld	T	G	FG	P
2021	England Knights	1	1	0	0	4
- Source: As of 29 March 2026

Connor Wrench (born 4 October 2001) is an English rugby league footballer who plays as a centre for the Huddersfield Giants in the Super League.

== Playing career ==
=== Warrington Wolves ===
Wrench made his Super League debut in round 14 of the 2020 Super League season for Warrington against the Salford Red Devils.

Wrench played eight games for Warrington in the 2023 Super League season as Warrington finished sixth on the table and qualified for the playoffs. He played in the clubs elimination playoff loss against St Helens.

On 26 August 2025 his immediate retirement was announced

=== Newcastle Thunder (loan) ===
On 6 May 2021 it was reported that he had signed for the Newcastle Thunder in the RFL Championship on loan.

=== Huddersfield Giants ===
On 6 March 2026 it was reported that he had come out of retirement and signed for the Huddersfield Giants in the Super League.
