= Adam Holroyd =

English rugby league footballer

Personal information
- Full name: Adam Holroyd
- Born: 5 September 2004 (age 21) Halifax, West Yorkshire, England
- Height: 6 ft 0 in (1.83 m)
- Weight: 13 st 1 lb (83 kg)

Playing information
- Position: Second-row
Club
Years	Team	Pld	T	G	FG	P
2022–	Warrington Wolves	47	7	0	0	28
- Source: As of 1 April 2026

Adam Holroyd (born 5 September 2004) is a professional rugby league footballer who plays as a second-row forward for the Warrington Wolves in the Super League.

In 2022 Holroyd made his début for Warrington in the Super League against the Leeds Rhinos.

On 7 June 2025, Holroyd played in Warrington's 8-6 Challenge Cup final loss against Hull Kingston Rovers.
