= Josh Thewlis (rugby league) =

English professional rugby league footballer

Personal information
- Full name: Josh James Thewlis
- Born: 30 April 2002 (age 24) Oldham, Greater Manchester, England
- Height: 6 ft 0 in (1.83 m)
- Weight: 14 st 2 lb (90 kg)

Playing information
- Position: Fullback, Wing
Club
Years	Team	Pld	T	G	FG	P
2019–	Warrington Wolves	132	58	105	0	496
Representative
Years	Team	Pld	T	G	FG	P
2017	Ireland Under 16's	1	1	1	0	6
2022–	England Knights	2	5	0	0	20
- Source: As of 16 November 2026
- Relatives: Jake Thewlis (brother)

Josh Thewlis (born 30 April 2002) is an English rugby league footballer who plays as a fullback or winger for the Warrington Wolves in the Super League.

== Background ==
Thewlis was born in Grasscroft, Oldham, Greater Manchester, England. He was educated at St Edwards’ Primary, Lees, and St Damian's RC Science College.

His brother Jake Thewlis is a fellow Warrington Wolves player.

Played amateur rugby league for Waterhead Warriors.

He is of Irish descent, representing Ireland against Wales at Under 16's level in 2017 (https://europeanrugbyleague.com/fixtures/817)

== Career ==
=== Warrington Wolves ===
Thewlis made his Super League debut for Warrington in their 34–4 victory over the Catalans Dragons in round 17 of the 2019 Super League season.

In round 8 of the 2023 Super League season, Thewlis scored two tries for Warrington in their 20–14 victory over Catalans. Thewlis played 21 games for Warrington in the 2023 Super League season as Warrington finished sixth on the table and qualified for the playoffs. He did not play in their elimination playoff defeat against St Helens.

In October 2023 Thewlis was called up to the full England squad ahead of the third test in the series against Tonga.

On 17 March 2024, Thewlis scored a hat-trick in Warrington's 58–4 victory over the hapless London side. On 8 June 2024, Thewlis played in Warrington's 2024 Challenge Cup final defeat against Wigan. Thewlis played a total of 22 games for Warrington in the 2024 Super League season as the club reached the semi-final before losing to Hull Kingston Rovers. On 7 June 2025, Thewlis played in Warrington's 8-6 Challenge Cup final loss against Hull Kingston Rovers.

Thewlis played 25 games for Warrington in the 2025 Super League season as Warrington missed the playoffs finishing 8th on the table. On 3 October 2026, Thewlis played in the 2026 Super League Grand Final, which Warrington lost to Wakefield Trinity 23-10.
